= Avis =

Avis is Latin for bird and may refer to:

== Aviation ==
- Auster Avis, a 1940s four-seat light aircraft developed from the Auster Autocrat (abandoned project)
- Avro Avis, a two-seat biplane
- Scottish Aeroplane Syndicate Avis, an early aircraft built by Howard Wright

== Businesses ==
- Avis Budget Group
- Avis Car Rental

== People ==
- Avis (name), a given name and a surname
- Menton J. Matthews III or Avis, musician

== Places ==
- Avis, Portugal, a municipality
- Avis, Ohio, United States, an unincorporated community
- Avis, Pennsylvania, United States, a borough

== Other uses ==
- Andover Village Improvement Society, a land preservation society
- Associazione Volontari Italiani Sangue, or AVIS, an Italian blood donation organisation
- Avis Dam, a dam near Windhoek, Namibia
- USS Avis (Sp-382), a United States Navy patrol boat in commission from 1917 to 1918
- List of newspapers named Avis
- House of Aviz (Portuguese: Avis), a dynasty of kings of Portugal
- Avis, an open-source implementation of the Elvin network event routing specification
- Avis, a fictional deity on The Orville
- -avis, a commonly used taxonomic suffix

== See also ==
- Aves (disambiguation)
- Aviz (disambiguation)
