= Locomotion (Orchestral Manoeuvres in the Dark song) =

Single by Orchestral Manoeuvres in the Dark

from the album Junk Culture
- B-side: "Her Body in My Soul"; "The Avenue"
- Released: 2 April 1984
- Studio: Various: AIR Studios (Montserrat); ICP Studios (Brussels); Wisseloord Studios (Hilversum)
- Genre: Electronic; synth-pop; new wave; dance-pop
- Length: 3:53; 5:22 (Extended Mix)
- Label: Virgin
- Songwriters: Paul Humphreys; Andy McCluskey; Gordian Troeller
- Producers: Orchestral Manoeuvres in the Dark; Brian Tench

Orchestral Manoeuvres in the Dark singles chronology
| "Telegraph" (1983) | "Locomotion" (1984) | "Talking Loud and Clear" (1984) |

Shaped picture disc
- 7" picture disc

Music video
- "Orchestral Manoeuvres In The Dark - Locomotion" on YouTube

"Locomotion" is a song by the English electronic band Orchestral Manoeuvres in the Dark (OMD), released on 2 April 1984 as the lead single from their fifth studio album, Junk Culture (1984). Following the critical and commercial disappointment of the experimental Dazzle Ships (1983), "Locomotion" represented a move toward more radio-friendly material for OMD. It became one of the band's biggest European hits, charting within the Top 5 in the UK, Ireland, Belgium and the Netherlands, while also peaking at No. 14 in West Germany.

"Locomotion" has received polarised responses from critics and fellow artists. The track has nevertheless been included on every OMD singles and greatest hits compilation album, and remains a fixture in the group's live sets.

== Background ==
"Locomotion" was recorded during the last week of sessions at Montserrat before the drums were overdubbed at ICP Studios in Brussels. The original song was combined with a steel drum rhythm that Paul Humphreys had written the previous week, and a bass line and piano that Gordian Troeller (the band's manager) contributed. The Fairlight CMI sampler was used to create the song's bass line, which according to bassist Andy McCluskey, "...was sampled and sequenced all in one go on the Fairlight." The track was mixed and the brass added at Wisseloord Studios in the Netherlands; the brass arrangements were made by Tony Visconti. The song marries downcast lyrics with upbeat melodies.

Jean-Pierre Berckmans shot the official video. Taking advantage of where they were living at the time, the band filmed this video in the cities of Ostend and Brussels in Belgium. Frontman Andy McCluskey recalled, "Funniest part of it was trying to look like we were on a Caribbean cruise in the middle of Ostend harbour at 2 in the morning on that sailing ship and you can see the hot air coming out as breath when I'm singing!" The Belgian model Anne Beyens appears in the video.

Live recordings of "Locomotion" have been issued on the 12" releases of the singles "La Femme Accident" (1985) "If You Leave" (1986) and the second CD single of "Everyday" (1993), as well as on the Architecture & Morality & More and Live in Berlin albums.

== Critical reception ==
"Locomotion", which represented a move toward more radio-friendly material for OMD, faced initial criticism – notably on BBC Radio 1's Round Table show. Debbi Voller of Number One wrote, "OMD have... travelled Second Class. This sounds like a chugging steam train because it never picks up speed. The only thing it's got going for it is a steel band playing on board." In Music Week, Jerry Smith referred to a "pretty uninteresting, unambitious and unexciting single".

Conversely, Tom Hibbert of Smash Hits saw "Locomotion" as a return to form after the commercially unsuccessful Dazzle Ships, observing a "swingy dance number that contains sharp horns, sparkling steel drums and no references whatsoever to genetic engineering. Pleasant." The North Wales Weekly News called the single "[OMD's] best since 'Enola Gay'." "Locomotion" was popular among WLIR listeners, who voted it "Screamer of the Week". KROQ ranked the song as the 31st-greatest of 1984; it later placed 368th in Q101's "Top 1,011 of All-Time".

Critic Dave Thompson praised "Locomotion" in a retrospective review for AllMusic, writing, "Everything about this number spells lightness: the breezy melody, the tootling synths, the giddy keyboards, and — best of all — the band's effervescent harmonies." Louder Than War journalist Paul Scott-Bates remarked, "In terms of a pop song, it borders classic – instantly recognisable from the first few seconds, a chorus that everyone knows and verses that were as memorable as choruses." Andy Jones of Classic Pop had been unimpressed by "Locomotion" but found it to be a "great" live song.

New Order co-founder Peter Hook – a longtime fan of OMD – disapproved of the track, calling it a "dreadful offering". On the other hand, Barenaked Ladies drummer Tyler Stewart contemplated "Locomotion" as his favourite OMD song, describing it as "darn good".

== B-sides ==
All formats featured "Her Body in My Soul" on the B-side. There is an additional track on the 12" vinyl and 3" CD singles, "The Avenue". Both songs can be found on the B-sides compilation album, Navigation: The OMD B-Sides (2001). "The Avenue" was the first song recorded at Montserrat and deals with the repetition of mistakes that people have made before you. The sample used in the song is taken from the Andrei Tarkovsky film Stalker (1979).

"The Avenue" was placed at no. 5 in Classic Pop's "Top 20 B-sides of the 80s".

== Track listings ==
=== 7" vinyl ===
- UK: Virgin / VS 660, VSS 660 (shaped picture disc)
- West Germany: Virgin / 106 377
- USA: Virgin / AM-2671
- France:Virgin / 90115

Side A
| No. | Title | Length |
|---|---|---|
| 1. | "Locomotion" | 3:53 |

Side B
| No. | Title | Length |
|---|---|---|
| 2. | "Her Body in My Soul" | 4:40 |

=== 12" vinyl ===
- UK: Virgin / VS 660-12
- France: Virgin / 80092
- USA: A&M Records / SP-12108

Side A
| No. | Title | Length |
|---|---|---|
| 1. | "Locomotion" (12" Version) | 5:22 |

Side B
| No. | Title | Length |
|---|---|---|
| 2. | "Her Body in My Soul" | 4:44 |
| 3. | "The Avenue" | 4:14 |

- Canada: Virgin / VDJ02 (promo)

Side A
| No. | Title | Length |
|---|---|---|
| 1. | "Locomotion" | 3:54 |

Side B
| No. | Title | Length |
|---|---|---|
| 2. | "Tesla Girls" | 3:49 |
| 3. | "Talking Loud and Clear" | 4:18 |

=== 3" CD ===
Released 25 July 1988, Virgin / CDT 12.

| No. | Title | Length |
|---|---|---|
| 1. | "Locomotion" (12" Version) | 5:22 |
| 2. | "Her Body in My Soul" | 4:44 |
| 3. | "The Avenue" | 4:14 |

== Charts ==
=== Weekly charts ===
| Chart (1984) | Peak position |
|---|---|
| Australia (Kent Music Report) | 30 |
| Belgium (Ultratop 50 Flanders) | 4 |
| Europe (European Hot 100 Singles) | 7 |
| Ireland (IRMA) | 4 |
| Netherlands (Dutch Top 40) | 5 |
| Netherlands (Single Top 100) | 8 |
| New Zealand (Recorded Music NZ) | 32 |
| Paraguay (UPI) | 10 |
| Switzerland (Schweizer Hitparade) | 22 |
| UK Singles (Official Charts) | 5 |
| US Hot Dance/Disco (Billboard) | 61 |
| West Germany (GfK) | 14 |

=== Year-end charts ===
| Chart (1984) | Position |
|---|---|
| Belgium (Ultratop 50 Flanders) | 37 |
| Netherlands (Dutch Top 40) | 64 |
| Netherlands (Single Top 100) | 77 |
