= Avenue =

Avenue or Avenues may refer to:

== Roads ==
- Avenue (landscape), traditionally a straight path or road with a line of trees, in the shifted sense a tree line itself, or some of boulevards (also without trees)
- Avenue Road, Bangalore
- Avenue Road, London
- Avenue Road, Toronto

== Music and entertainment ==
- Avenue (band), X Factor UK contestants
- Avenues (band), American pop punk band
- "Avenue" (song), a 1992 single by British pop group Saint Etienne
- "Avenues" (song), a 1997 song by Refugee Camp All-Stars
- Avenue (magazine), a former Dutch magazine
- "The Avenue", B-side of the 1984 Orchestral Manoeuvres in the Dark single "Locomotion"

== Other uses ==
- Avenue (archaeology), a specialist term in archaeology referring to lines of stones
- Avenue (store), a clothing store
- The Avenue, a Rugby Union stadium in Sunbury-on-Thames, England
- L'Avenue, a skyscraper in Montreal, Quebec, Canada
- Avenue, a GIS scripting language for ArcView 3.x
- Avenues: The World School, school in New York City

== See also ==
- Avinu (disambiguation)
- The Avenues (disambiguation)
- AVE (disambiguation)
