= Aviz =

Aviz may refer to:

- Aviz, Fars, a village in Fars Province, Iran
- Aviz, the medieval name of Avis, Portugal
- Aviz, South Khorasan, a village in South Khorasan Province, Iran
- Tarik Aviz, a village in Lorestan Province, Iran
- Aviz Rural District, in Fars Province, Iran
- House of Aviz, a dynasty of the kings of Portugal
- Order of Aviz, a Portuguese Order of Chivalry
- Order of Aviz (Brazil), a former Imperial Brazilian military order, originating from the ancient Portuguese Military Order of Aviz

== See also ==
- Avis (disambiguation)
