= Aves (disambiguation) =

Aves refers to birds, a class of vertebrate animals.

Aves may also refer to:

- Aves Island, a Caribbean island administered by Venezuela
- Aves Island (Andaman Islands), a Andaman island administered by India
- Aves (Santo Tirso), a town and a parish in northern Portugal
- C.D. Aves, a Portuguese football (soccer) club
- Las Aves Archipelago, a group of islands off the coast of Venezuela
- The Birds (play) or Aves, a comedic play by Aristophanes
- Aves (surname), people with the name

== See also ==
- AVE (disambiguation)
- Avis (disambiguation)
- The Avenues (disambiguation)
