= Avinu =

Avinu means "Our Father" in Hebrew. The term may also refer to:

- Abraham Avinu Synagogue - located in Hebron, a spiritual center of the Jewish Community and a major center for the study of Kabbalah
- See Ketu_North_(Ghana_parliament_constituency)#Elections for Albert Korbla Avinu - parliament candidate for the New Patriotic Party in Ghana in the 2000 election
- Avraham Avinu - in the Jewish tradition, Abraham, founding patriarch of the Israelites
- Avenu Malcanu - a song from the album Live Phish Volume 10
- Avinu - a song by Shloime Dachs
- Avinu Malkeinu - meaning "Our Father, Our King," a Jewish prayer
- Avinu Malkenu - song on the Shangri-La (Elkie Brooks album) album by Elkie Brooks
- Avinu Malkeynu - a song by Max Janowski
- Moses ben Avraham Avinu - an Austrian printer and author who was a Christian convert to Judaism
- Yaacov Avinu - in the Jewish tradition, Jacob, son of Abraham, founder of the twelve tribes of Israel

== See also ==
- Avenue (disambiguation)
- My Father My King - a song by Scottish post-rock band Mogwai, which was recorded and released as a single in 2001
- Ne'ila - the concluding Jewish prayer service for Yom Kippur
- Quando el Rey Nimrod - a Judaeo-Spanish folk song.
- Sukkah#Ushpizin - a Jewish "spiritual guest" during Sukkot
