= Avenue Road =

Avenue Road may refer to:

- Avenue Road, Bangalore, busy shopping and commercial street in Bangalore
- Avenue Road, London, street in the Swiss Cottage and St John's Wood districts of London
- Avenue Road tram stop, tram stop in the London Borough of Bromley
- Avenue Road, Toronto, major north–south street in Toronto, Ontario
  - Avenue Road Church

== See also ==
- Avenue (disambiguation)
