= Las Aves =

Las Aves might refer to either of two Venezuelan island territories:

- Isla de Aves or Aves Island, an island to the west of Guadeloupe in the Lesser Antilles
- Las Aves Archipelago, a group of islands to the east of Bonaire in the Leeward Antilles

== See also ==
- Aves (disambiguation)
