= AVE (disambiguation) =

Ave is a Latin salutation meaning "hail". Additionally, AVE is Alta Velocidad Española, a high-speed rail service in Spain.

AVE, Ave, Avé, or variants, may also refer to:

== People ==
- Ave, pen name of the Swedish writer Eva Wigström (1832–1901)
- Anthony Van Engelen, American professional skateboarder also known by the acronym "AVE"

== Places ==
- Ave., an abbreviation for avenue, a street or road name
- Ave (intermunicipal community), a Portuguese subregion
- Avé, Togo, a prefecture in Togo
- Ave River, Portugal
- The Ave or University Way NE, Seattle, Washington, United States

== Art, entertainment, and media ==
- Avé (film), a 2011 Bulgarian film
- Avé, a 2017 album by Venom Inc.
- AVE, American Video Entertainment, a video game company
- AVE, Artists' Vocal Ensemble, a choir from San Francisco, California
- AVE, a Greek group of companies led by a home video distributor

== Language ==
- AVE, African American Vernacular English, an African American variety (dialect, ethnolect and sociolect) of American English
- AVE, Avestan language (ISO 639 alpha-3, ave), an East Iranian language

== Organisations ==
- AVE, Advanced Vehicle Engineers, a former US flying car aviation company
- AVE, Against Violent Extremism, a global network of former extremists and survivors of extremist violence

== Science and technology ==
- Atmospheric vortex engine, a proposed technology
- Average variance extracted, a statistical theory

== See also ==
- Ave Maria, or Hail Mary, a traditional Catholic prayer
- Avenue (disambiguation)
- Aves (disambiguation)
