= Auster Autocrat =

Touring aircraft family by Auster

J/1 Autocrat
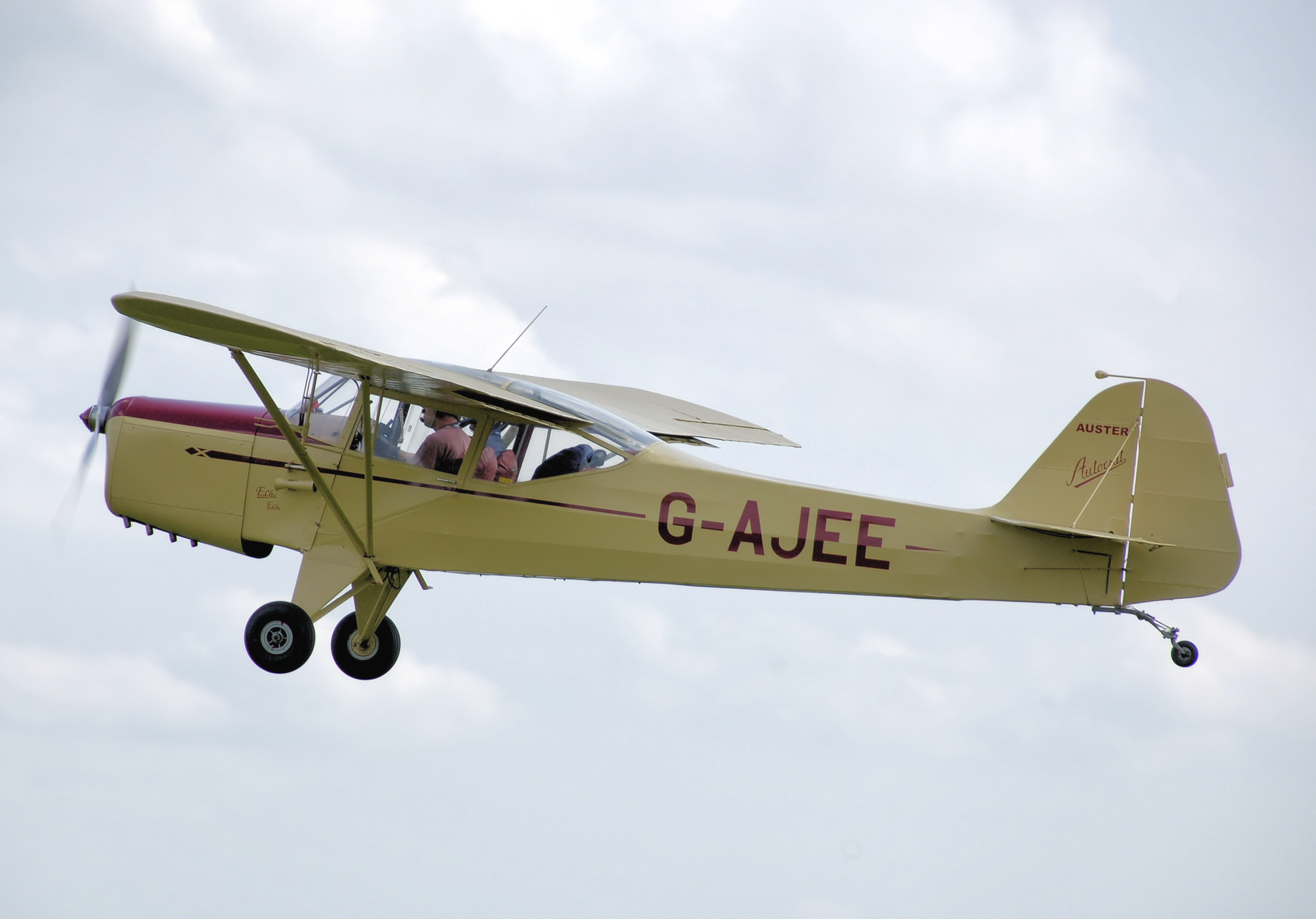

General information
- Type: Touring aircraft
- Manufacturer: Auster Aircraft Limited
- Number built: 420

History
- Manufactured: 1945–1952
- Introduction date: 1945
- First flight: 1945
- Developed from: Taylorcraft Auster 5
- Variants: Auster J/1B Aiglet; Auster Workmaster; Auster Avis

The Auster J/1 Autocrat was a 1940s British single-engined three-seat high-wing touring monoplane built by Auster Aircraft Limited at Rearsby, Leicestershire.

== History ==
As the end of the Second World War approached, the designers at Taylorcraft decided to develop a tourer version of the robust and reliable Taylorcraft Auster Model J AOP.V observation aircraft series. An Auster 5, registered G-AGOH, was modified to take a 100 hp (75 kW) Blackburn Cirrus II engine for trials. At the same time a prototype aircraft was built designated the Taylorcraft Auster V Series J/1 Autocrat. The long name was not used as the company changed name to Auster Aircraft Limited and the aircraft became known as the Auster J/1 Autocrat.

The designation J/1 derived from the progenitor Model J, which was the Auster AOP.V.

== Production and operation ==
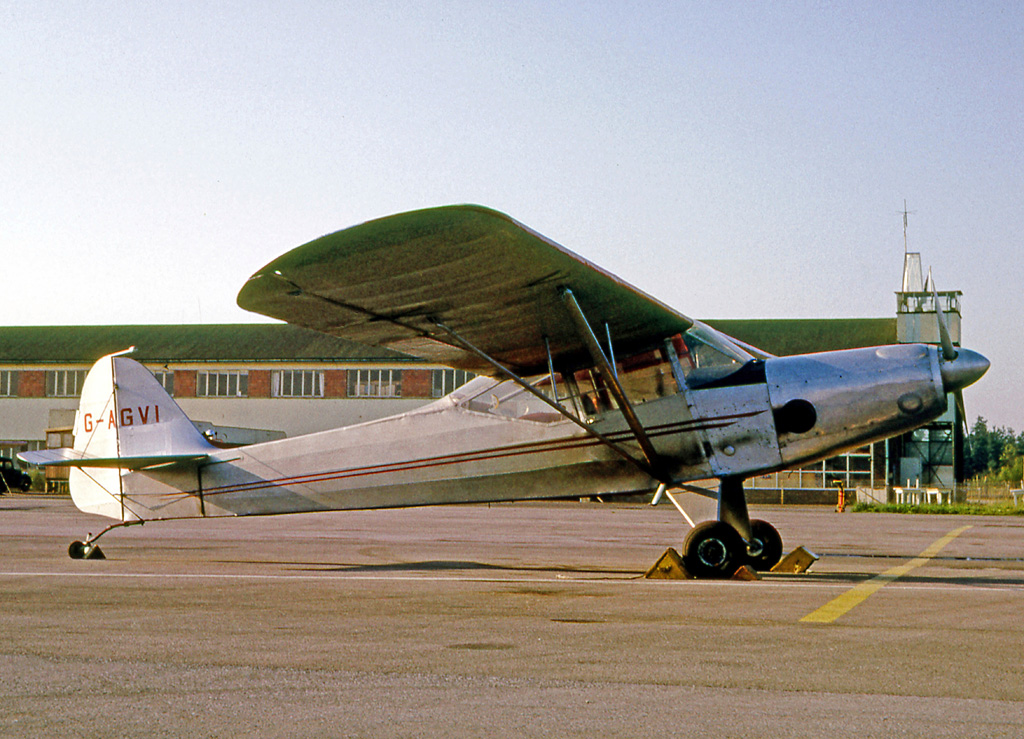
J/1 Autocrat in 1966 powered by a Rover TP gas turbine engine

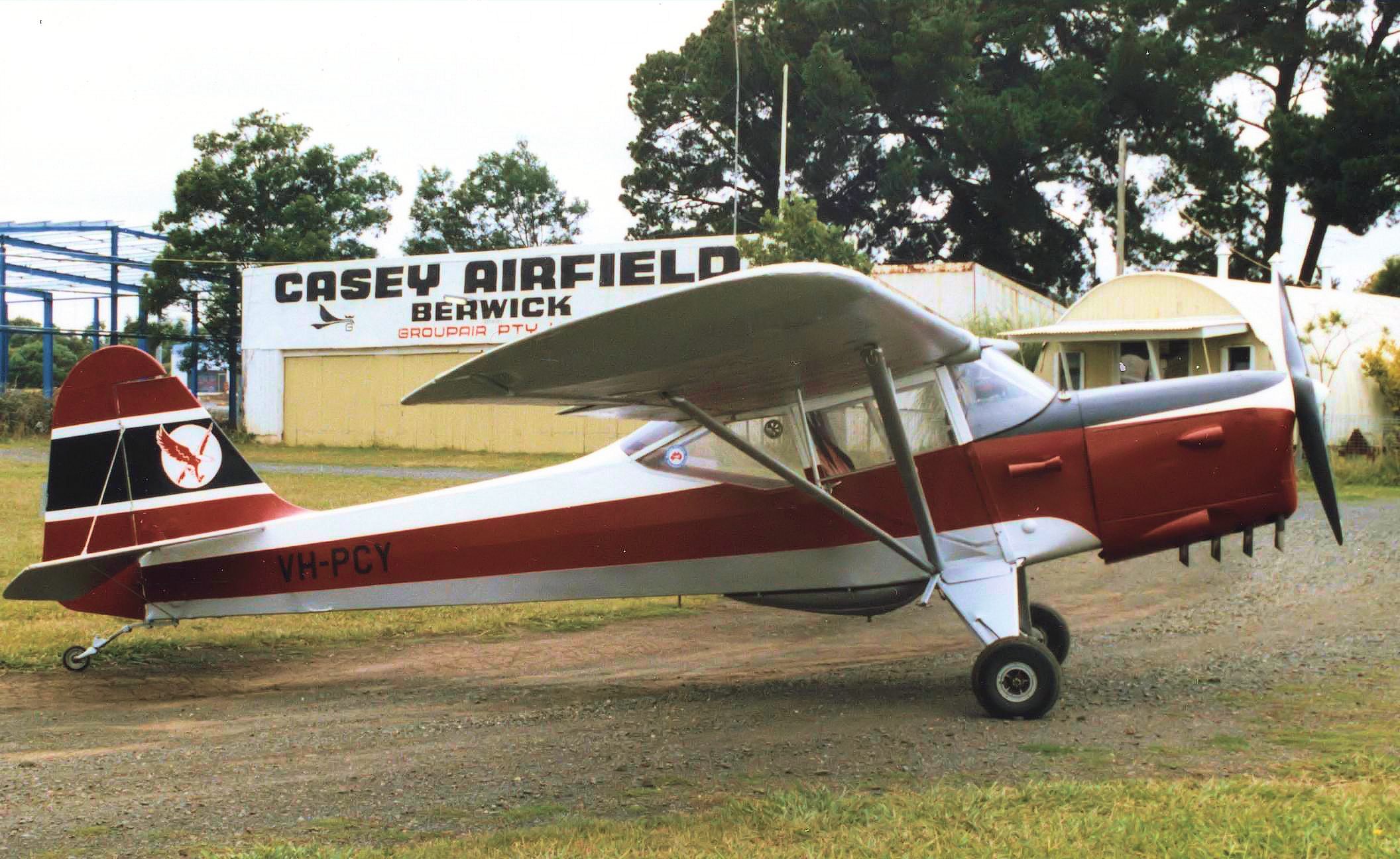
Auster J/1N Alpha in British Eagle colours at Casey Airfield, Berwick, Victoria, Australia in 1988

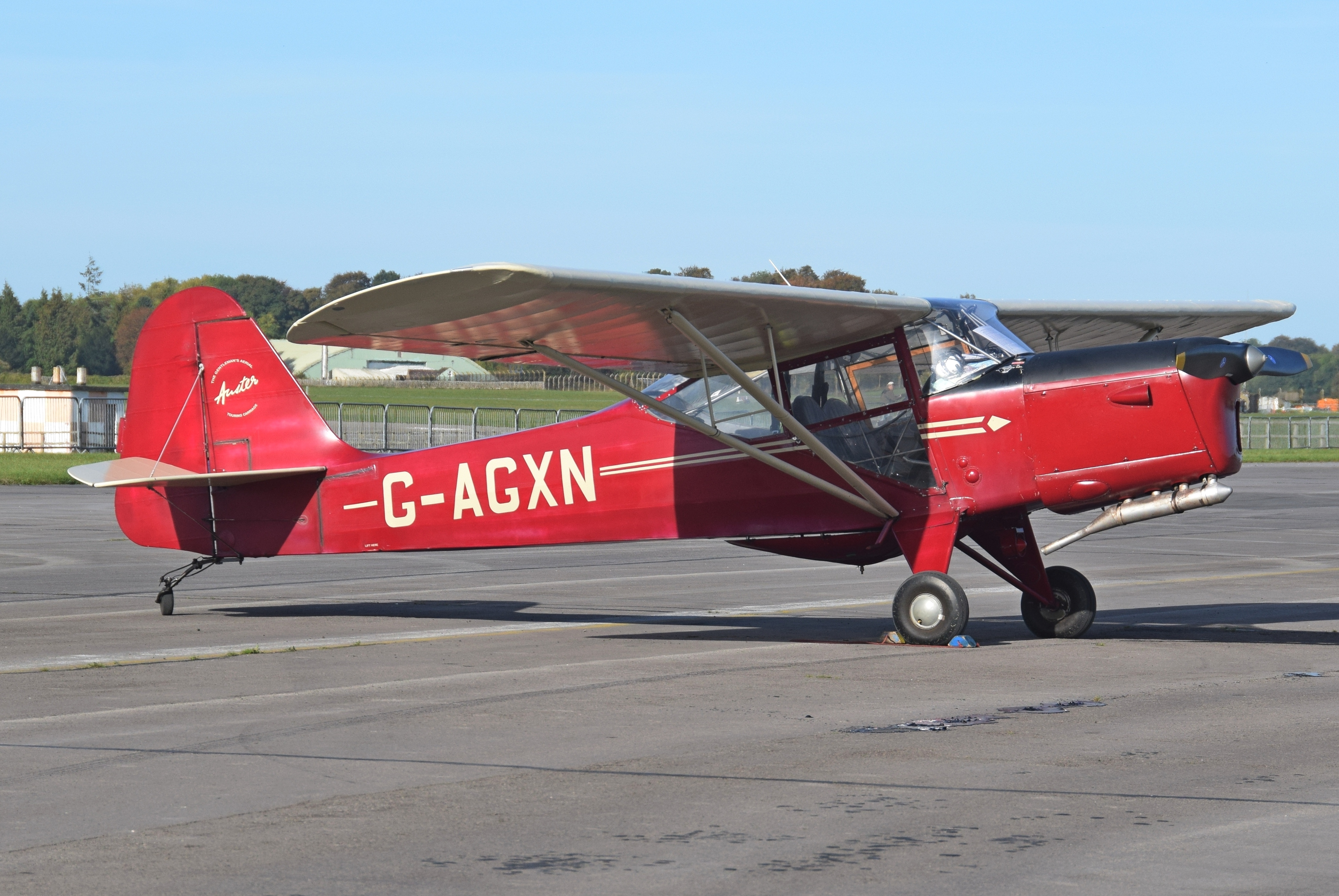
1946 Auster J/1N Alpha aircraft in England

The first production aircraft, registered G-AGTO, was delivered in December 1945. One of the more spectacular feats of the type was the first visit of a civilian aircraft to an aircraft carrier, HMS Illustrious in the English Channel in October 1946. The last Rearsby built J/1s were delivered in 1952.

The Autocrat became one of the most successful post-war British light aircraft with more than 400 built. A small number of variants were built and the aircraft became the basis for a family of light aircraft. The Autocrat was used by individual pilots, aero clubs and by small charter firms for passenger flights, banner towing and photography.

Many J/1s were converted to J/1N Alpha standard with a higher fin and fitted with a 130 h.p. Gipsy Major engine, as used in the J/1B Aiglet. 45 new build J/1N Alphas were completed in 1956–57, mainly for export to Australia.

A single Autocrat G-AGVI was converted by V.H. Bellamy in 1965 to be powered by a Rover TP gas turbine engine. It reverted to normal power in 1968.

Starting in 1946, newly built examples of the Autocrat and Alpha were exported direct from the production line at Rearsby to many countries worldwide including Argentina, Australia, Belgium, Brazil, Ceylon, Denmark, Egypt, France, Iraq, Jordan, Netherlands, New Zealand, Norway, Pakistan, South Africa, Southern Rhodesia, Sweden, Switzerland, Trinidad and Tobago, Uganda and Uruguay. Other UK-registered aircraft were later sold overseas on the secondhand market.

Numbers of Autocrats and Alphas continue to fly into the 2010s with private owners in the United Kingdom, Australia, New Zealand and elsewhere.

== Variants ==
Auster J/1 Autocrat
production version with Blackburn Cirrus Major engine. Several later fitted with engines up to the 150 h.p. Lycoming O-320-A1A.
Auster J/1A Autocrat
additional (fourth-seat) for joyriding.
Auster J/1N Alpha
powered by a de Havilland Gipsy Major I engine and with enlarged tail surfaces. Four seater.
Auster J/1S Autocrat
powered by a 145 h.p. de Havilland Gipsy Major 10 Mk 2-2 engine.

Kingsford Smith Kingsmith
An Auster J/1 conversion in Australia by Kingsford Smith Aviation Services, fitted with a 150hp (112kW) Avco Lycoming O-320 engine and other improvement (including better seating and sound-proofing).

== Operators ==
=== Civil operators ===
Iran

- Imperial Iranian Aero Club

Israel

- Sherut Avir
- Israeli Air Force

Kuwait

- Kuwait Air Force

Jordan

- Royal Jordanian Air Force

Pakistan

- Royal Pakistan Air Force

Rhodesia

- Rhodesian Air Force – one aircraft only

Southern Rhodesia

- Southern Rhodesian Air Force – one aircraft only

== Specifications (Auster J/1 Autocrat) ==
Data from British Civil Aviation since 1919 Volume 1

General characteristics

- Crew: 1
- Capacity: 2 passengers
- Length: 23 ft 5 in (7.14 m)
- Wingspan: 36 ft 0 in (10.97 m)
- Height: 6 ft 6 in (1.98 m) (tail down propeller horizontal)
- Wing area: 185 sq ft (17.2 m^{2})
- Empty weight: 1,052 lb (477 kg)
- Gross weight: 1,850 lb (839 kg)
- Fuel capacity: Fuel: 15 imp gal (18 US gal; 68 L)
- Powerplant: 1 × Blackburn Cirrus Minor 2 4-cyl air-cooled inverted in-line piston engine, 100 hp (75 kW)
- Propellers: 2-bladed Fairey-Reed metal or Weybridge wooden fixed pitch propeller, 6 ft (1.8 m) diameter

Performance

- Maximum speed: 120 mph (190 km/h, 100 kn)
- Cruise speed: 100 mph (160 km/h, 87 kn)
- Stall speed: 30 mph (48 km/h, 26 kn) 2 crew and flaps down
- Range: 320 mi (510 km, 280 nmi)
- Service ceiling: 14,000 ft (4,300 m)
- Rate of climb: 568 ft/min (2.89 m/s)
- Take-off run: 250 yd (230 m) in 5 mph (4.3 kn; 8.0 km/h) wind
- Landing run: 99 yd (91 m) in 5 mph (4.3 kn; 8.0 km/h) wind

== See also ==
Related development

- Auster Avis
