= Genetic Engineering (song) =

Single by Orchestral Manoeuvres in the Dark

from the album Dazzle Ships
- B-side: "4-NEU"
- Released: 11 February 1983
- Recorded: The Manor, Shipton-on-Cherwell, Oxfordshire, England
- Genre: Synth-pop
- Length: 3:37; 5:18 (12")
- Label: Telegraph (Virgin)
- Songwriters: Andy McCluskey, Paul Humphreys
- Producers: OMD, Rhett Davies

Orchestral Manoeuvres in the Dark singles chronology
"She's Leaving" (1982)	"Genetic Engineering" (1983)	"Telegraph" (1983)

Music video
- "Orchestral Manoeuvres In The Dark - Genetic Engineering" on YouTube

"Genetic Engineering" is a 1983 song by the English electronic band Orchestral Manoeuvres in the Dark (OMD), released as the first single from their fourth studio album Dazzle Ships. The synthesized speech featured on the track is taken from a Speak & Spell, an educational electronic toy developed by Texas Instruments in the 1970s intended to teach children spelling.

"Genetic Engineering" reached number 20 on the UK Singles Chart. It was also a Top 20 hit in several European territories, and peaked at number 5 in Spain. In the US it made number 32 on the Billboard Mainstream Rock chart.

== Reception and legacy ==
Smash Hits wrote, "Well worth the wait. OMD's knack of coming up with exhilarating singles has not been affected by their year off... a great tune." Jim Reid in Record Mirror said, "Madly infectious hookline propels a song absolutely dripping with 'moderne' references. A cold record, whose raison d'être lies in the application of studio technology and the manipulation of hackneyed goobledegook. Should be massive – won't touch my turntable again." In a later piece, God Is in the TV's Andy Page wrote that "Genetic Engineering" is "surely one of the most inventive and unusual singles ever to reach the [UK] Top 20". Ned Raggett of AllMusic praised the "soaring", "enjoyable" track, asserting, "Why it wasn't a [US] hit remains a mystery." "Genetic Engineering" appeared in Radio X's "25 Best Indie Songs of 1983".

Musician Moby named "Genetic Engineering" as an important record in his life, while The Time Frequency's Jon Campbell hailed it as OMD's best track. Artist Mary McIntyre wrote in 2023, "OMD let fly with the most raucous electronic sound I had ever encountered. I was stunned. I still to this day think it's one of the most exhilarating pieces of music I have ever heard. A cacophony of joyous, raw, synthetic sound." Covers of the song were released by the indie bands Another Sunny Day and Eggs. Critics have compared the track to "Fitter Happier", a 1997 song by rock group Radiohead. Theon Weber in Stylus saw the Radiohead track as "deeply indebted".

Frontman McCluskey has noted that the song is not an attack on genetic engineering, as many – including radio presenter Dave Lee Travis – have assumed. McCluskey professed to be "very positive about the subject", adding, "People didn't listen to the lyrics... I think they automatically assumed it would be anti."

== B-side ==
The song "4-Neu" was featured on the B-side of both the 7" and 12" versions. It was not included on the Dazzle Ships album and remained exclusive to this release until its inclusion on Navigation: The OMD B-Sides (2001), and then on the remastered special edition of Dazzle Ships in 2008. The song continues the band's tradition of including more experimental tracks as B-sides to singles. Its title is a tribute to German krautrock band Neu!, who were an important influence on McCluskey and keyboardist Paul Humphreys prior to OMD. "4-Neu" was never performed live until the special performance of Dazzle Ships at The Museum of Liverpool in November 2014 and at the Dazzle Ships / Architecture & Morality live performances in London and Germany in May 2016.

== Track listing ==
=== 7" vinyl single and 7" picture disc ===
- UK: Telegraph VS 527

Side one

1. "Genetic Engineering" – 3:37

Side two

1. "4-NEU" – 3:33

=== 12" vinyl single ===
- UK: Telegraph VS 527-12

Side one

1. "Genetic Engineering" (312mm version) – 5:18

Side two

1. "4-NEU" – 3:33

== Charts ==
Chart (1983)	Peak position
Belgium (Ultratop 50 Flanders)	18
Ireland (IRMA)	11
Spain (AFYVE)	5
UK Singles (Official Charts)	20
US Mainstream Rock (Billboard)	32
West Germany (GfK)	20

== Promo video ==
A promotional video for "Genetic Engineering" was directed by Steve Barron, who directed videos for a wide variety of artists in the eighties, such as the Human League, Tears for Fears, and A-ha. The video features a number of genetics-related books, some of which McCluskey would later borrow to read himself. McClusky described the songs music video as not being his "favourite video", but still contained a "couple of interesting moments, with Mally and Martin as the Kray brothers!" The Rolls-Royce used in the clip was owned by comedian Mel Smith. The girl featured in the promotional video is played by actress Joann Kenny.

The promotional video for "Genetic Engineering" was included on the Messages: Greatest Hits CD/DVD release (2008).

== Alternative versions and live performances ==
Apart from the extended '312mm version' the band also recorded the song for a John Peel radio session in 1983. This version was made available on Peel Sessions 1979–1983 (2000).

OMD played the song live on The Tube during its first series in February 1983.

The song was performed live during the Dazzle Ships promotional tour but rarely since then, until more recent performances in 2014 and 2016.
