= Tesla Girls =

Single by Orchestral Manoeuvres in the Dark

from the album Junk Culture
- B-side: "Telegraph" (Live); "Garden City"
- Released: 28 August 1984
- Recorded: May 1983
- Studio: AIR (Salem, Montserrat)
- Genre: Hi-NRG; dance-pop
- Length: 3:51
- Label: Virgin
- Songwriters: Paul Humphreys; Andy McCluskey
- Producers: Orchestral Manoeuvres in the Dark; Brian Tench

Orchestral Manoeuvres in the Dark singles chronology
"Talking Loud and Clear" (1984)	"Tesla Girls" (1984)	"Never Turn Away" (1984)

Music video
- "Tesla Girls" on YouTube

"Tesla Girls" is a song by the English electronic band Orchestral Manoeuvres in the Dark (OMD), released as the third single from their fifth studio album, Junk Culture (1984). It peaked at No. 21 in the UK and Ireland, and No. 33 on the Dutch Top 40. Although only moderately successful on the charts, it became one of the group's biggest club hits.

"Tesla Girls" appeared in the John Hughes film Weird Science (1985).

== Background ==
The song title refers to the Serbian-American engineer, futurist, and inventor Nikola Tesla, and was suggested by the Canadian academic, designer and musician Martha Ladly, who had also suggested the title of their third studio album Architecture & Morality (1981). Tesla is known for his contributions to the design of the modern alternating current (AC) electricity supply system. "The references to electric chairs and dynamos is actually a reference to dynamos which was essential for the use of the alternating current and anything electrical basically," said Andy McCluskey in an online Q&A session in 1998.

== Critical reception and legacy ==
"Tesla Girls" met with a few detractors on release. Singer Kim Wilde – whose work had been influenced by OMD – called the song "inane and monotonous". On the other hand, Billboard categorised the single as "recommended", while observing "nervous electronics and obscure lyrics by one of the new wave's trendsetting bands". "Tesla Girls" was popular among WLIR listeners, who voted it "Screamer of the Week".

In retrospective articles, critics have directed praise toward the track's "witty" and "clever" lyrics, as well as its scratch production; favourable comparisons have been made to American pop and rock duo Sparks. Ned Raggett of AllMusic commended the song's melody and "brilliant, hyperactive intro", identifying it as "the group's high point when it comes to sheer sprightly pop". Louder Than War's Paul Scott-Bates wrote that "Tesla Girls" is "as perfect as pop singles get", while critic Dave Thompson described it as "anthemic" and "a quintessential dance number". Electronic duo Komputer professed to "love" the track, adding that it "does a great mash-up with 'Hersham Boys' by Sham 69".

"Tesla Girls" became one of OMD's biggest club hits, and appeared in KROQ and Slicing Up Eyeballs rankings of 1984's best tracks. It was placed at no. 152 in WLIR's 1988 list of the "Top 200 Songs of All-Time". Writing about the electroclash genre that emerged in the late 1990s, AllMusic journalist Andy Kellman identified "Tesla Girls" as a track that "expose[s] the scene's roots rather accurately".

== Versions ==
Several versions of the song exist in recorded form, including two new versions coming to light on the deluxe re-issue of the Junk Culture album in 2015.

- original Junk Culture album version (1984) — 3:51
- 7" edit (1984) — 3:26
- 12" version (1984) — 4:25
- 12" 'extra remix' (1984) — 3:37
- 12" (US only) 'specially remixed version' (1984) 5:03 — also includes an instrumental version (4:43) and a 'video version' (3:26)
- compilation album version — 3:34 (used on compilation albums such as The Best of OMD and The OMD Singles)
- 'extended mix' — 4:44, as featured on the So80s OMD remix compilation album (2011)
- Junk Culture Deluxe re-issue version (2015) — 3:36 (replacing the original album track)
- Highland Studios Demo (1983) — 4:01, bonus track featured on Junk Culture deluxe re-issue (2015)

An early live version from 1983 also exists in bootleg form.

== B-sides ==
The 7" release features a live version of the Dazzle Ships track and single "Telegraph" recorded in 1983 at the Hammersmith Odeon, London. The intro to another Dazzle Ships track, "Radio Waves", can be heard in the fade-out.

The 12" and cassette releases feature a new song, "Garden City", which remained exclusive to this release until it was featured on the B-sides compilation album Navigation: The OMD B-Sides (2001).

== Track listing ==
7" and 7" picture disc

1. "Tesla Girls" – 3:26
2. "Telegraph" (live) – 3:57

First 12"

1. "Tesla Girls" (extended version) – 4:35
2. "Garden City" – 4:05
3. "Telegraph" (live) – 3:57

Second 12" and cassette

1. "Tesla Girls" (Extra Remix) – 3:37
2. "Garden City" – 4:05
3. "Telegraph" (live) – 3:57
4. "Tesla Girls" (extended version) – 4:35

US 12" (A&M Records – SP-12120)

1. Tesla Girls (Specially Remixed Version) – 5:03
2. Tesla Girls (Instrumental Version) – 4:43
3. Tesla Girls (Video Version) – 3:26

== Charts ==
Chart (1984)	Peak position
Belgium (Ultratop 50 Flanders)	32
Europe (European Hot 100 Singles)	35
Ireland (IRMA)	21
Netherlands (Single Top 100)	33
Netherlands (Tipparade)	8
UK Singles (Official Charts)	21
