= Junk Culture =

Studio album by Orchestral Manoeuvres in the Dark
- Released: 30 April 1984
- Recorded: 1983–1984
- Studios: AIR (Salem, Montserrat); ICP (Brussels, Belgium); Wisseloord (Hilversum, Netherlands); Highland (Inverness); Chapel (Lincolnshire); Mayfair (London); The Manor (Shipton-on-Cherwell)
- Genres: Electronic; synth-pop
- Length: 43:05
- Label: Virgin
- Producers: Brian Tench; OMD

Orchestral Manoeuvres in the Dark chronology
Dazzle Ships (1983)	Junk Culture (1984)	Crush (1985)

Singles from Junk Culture
- 1. "Locomotion" Released: 2 April 1984; 2. "Talking Loud and Clear" Released: 4 June 1984; 3. "Tesla Girls" Released: 28 August 1984; 4. "Never Turn Away" Released: 29 October 1984

Junk Culture is the fifth studio album by the English electronic band Orchestral Manoeuvres in the Dark (OMD), released on 30 April 1984 by Virgin Records. After the commercial disappointment of the experimental Dazzle Ships (1983), OMD and Virgin intended for the group to shift towards a more accessible sound on its follow-up release. The band retained much of their early experimental approach but embraced a wider range of influences than previously, drawing inspiration from pop, dance, Latin and black music. Frontman Andy McCluskey characterised Junk Culture as "the catchiest, poppiest album [OMD] ever made".

Despite alienating some listeners, the record met with a generally positive critical and commercial response. It became OMD's fourth consecutive Top 10 album in the UK, and has been named as one of the best releases of 1984. Junk Culture spawned four singles, including the UK Top 20 entries "Locomotion" and "Talking Loud and Clear", and the club hit "Tesla Girls". The album was remastered and re-released in 2015, with a bonus disc of B-sides and extended mixes.

== Background ==
"We kind of consciously and unconsciously decided to dial down some of the experiments and dial up some of the melodies. We had to think, 'This is our job, this is how we pay the bills, so we better be more careful'... [Dazzle Ships] nearly killed our career."

— Andy McCluskey

Virgin Records had been alarmed by the hostile critical and commercial response to experimental predecessor studio album Dazzle Ships (1983). OMD were compelled to sell more records in order to maintain their deal with the label, and consequently moved towards a radio-friendly sound. Keyboardist Paul Humphreys recalled, "We made an album to save our career, really. If we'd done another Dazzle Ships, Virgin would definitely have dropped us." The band elected not to record in their own Gramophone Suite studio in Liverpool; instead, McCluskey and Humphreys wrote and demoed songs separately at home. Neither man satisfied with the results of this approach, OMD regrouped, working at Highland Studios in Inverness for three weeks. The band trialled some of the new compositions on a September 1983 UK club tour, with Howard Jones as support. Afterwards, they recorded with producer Brian Tench at Chapel Studios in Lincolnshire, then moved on to Mayfair Studios in London. In contrast to the arduous Dazzle Ships era, recording sessions were positive and the group were writing prolifically.

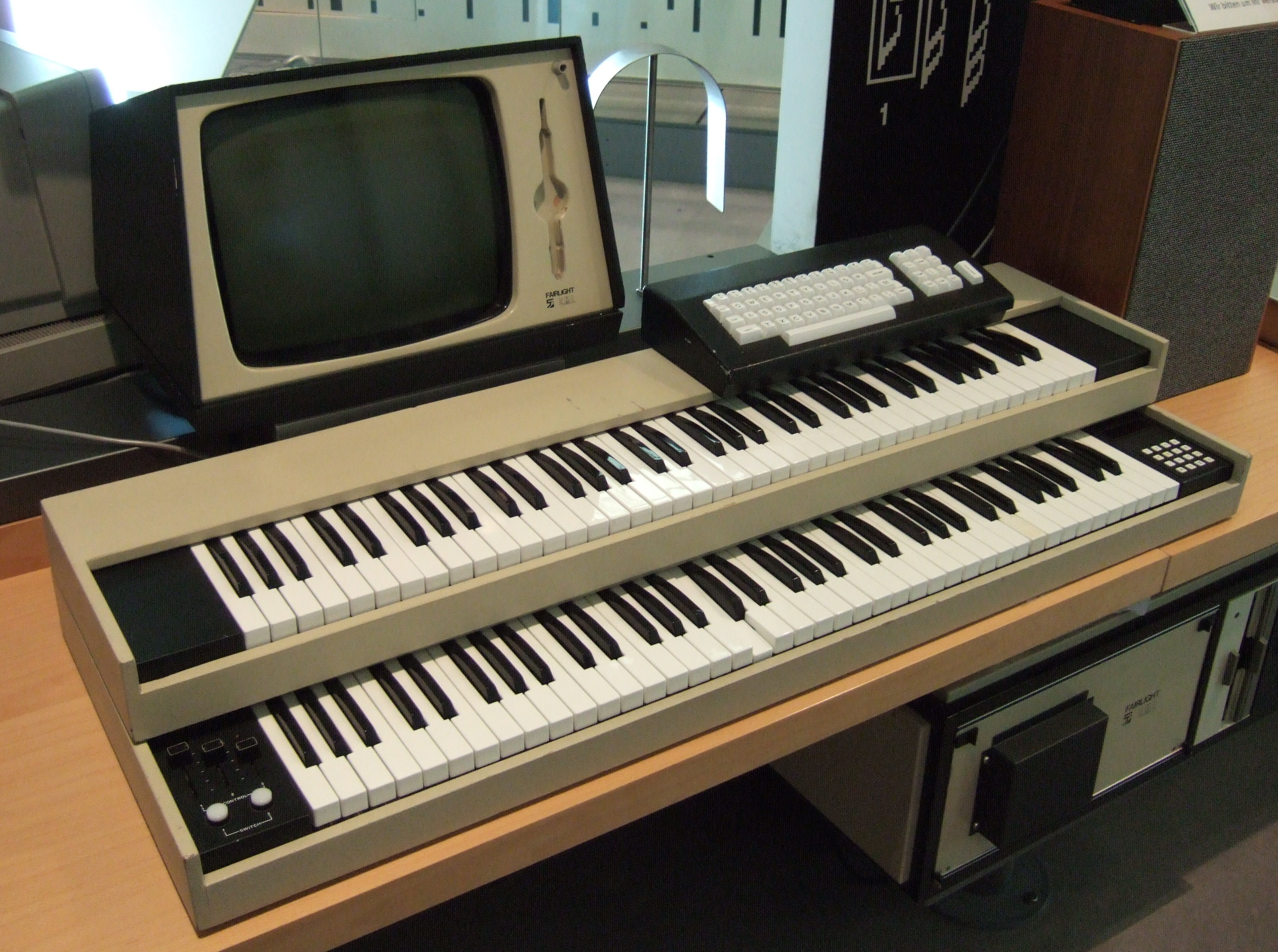
On Junk Culture, OMD made extensive use of the Fairlight CMI sampler keyboard.

A single release of "Tesla Girls" was considered for late 1983 but was rejected by Virgin, who insisted the band concentrate on the album. OMD and Tench travelled to AIR Studios in the "paradise setting" of Montserrat, introducing a newly-acquired Fairlight CMI sampler keyboard; the group had followed advice to leave the UK and become tax exiles, in order to preserve royalties from the successful Architecture & Morality (1981). The sessions lasted two months, during which time OMD were inspired by the sounds of local calypso and reggae music, including those of Montserratian musician Arrow. The band also incorporated various pop, dance, R&B and Latin influences into their recordings, while retaining much of their trademark sonic experimentation. The songs deviated somewhat from the minimal OMD style of old, taking on more of a full band sound under the direction of Tench.

When the group ran out of studio time in Montserrat, they returned to Europe to finish off the album at the more affordable ICP Studios in Brussels. Producer Tony Visconti was recruited to assist with the record, but was unavailable until three weeks later; the band took a break and went travelling, which dispelled simmering doubts about the new material. Having been unimpressed by ICP, the group reconvened at Wisseloord in Hilversum, Netherlands. Visconti was already satisfied with Tench and OMD's production efforts: his main contributions were the addition and arrangement of brass parts on "Locomotion" and "All Wrapped Up". The working relationship was strained, with Humphreys stating, "The record company suggested we bring in Tony Visconti. We thought, 'Great,' because he'd worked with [David] Bowie. But he really didn't understand us. There's a great quote in his book where he says something like, 'Those guys rely far too much on technology. I wanted to bring musicians into the band.' He really didn't get us." Mixing of Junk Culture was completed by Tench. According to OMD's official site, recording also took place at The Manor, Shipton-on-Cherwell.

McCluskey said of the album's title in 1984, "We began to appreciate that it wasn't enough to simply dismiss popular culture as being worthless, that there is some merit in almost everything; video, computer games, junk food, pop music and so on." He added that "the lyrics reflect a sort of loss of inhibitions - the idea that you don't have to think something is artistically right in order to enjoy it." In a 2019 interview McCluskey expanded upon the choice of title: "I was fully aware we were going to get hammered... I was desperate for a title that would legitimise us making a pop album: it's acceptable as long as you do it knowingly." "Love and Violence" was considered as a title, owing to the record's contrast between love songs and more aggressive tracks. As with previous studio albums, the cover artwork was designed by Peter Saville Associates (with photography by Richard Houghton). For the first time OMD supplied lyrics on the record's inner sleeve.

== Release ==
Junk Culture was released on 30 April 1984 and entered the UK Albums Chart a week later, the same week that lead single "Locomotion" was at its chart peak of No. 5. Limited pressings of the vinyl LP came with a free one-sided 7-inch single featuring the track "(The Angels Keep Turning) The Wheels of the Universe". Despite alienating some longtime OMD fans, the record entered the UK Albums Chart at No. 9, outselling the new album by contemporaries the Cure (The Top), although beaten by fellow Merseyside band Echo & the Bunnymen, whose Ocean Rain entered at No. 4. All three records gradually dropped down the charts in successive weeks. Sales of Junk Culture were boosted during the release of the second single "Talking Loud and Clear", although it dropped out of the Top 40 altogether in August. The third single, "Tesla Girls" did not make the UK Top 20 but became one of the band's biggest club hits. A fourth single, "Never Turn Away", was released at the behest of Virgin.

Junk Culture was the first OMD album to be released contemporaneously on all three formats of vinyl, cassette and compact disc.

== Critical reception ==
Professional ratings
Review scores
Source	Rating
AllMusic	4/5 stars
Calgary Herald	A
Classic Pop	4/5 stars
Louder Than War	8.5/10
MusicHound	4/5 stars
Number One	4/5 stars
Record Collector	4/5 stars
Record Mirror	5/5 stars
Smash Hits	7/10
The Village Voice	B

Junk Culture met with a generally positive critical reception, although the UK music press showed less enthusiasm than the country's mainstream outlets. What Hi-Fi? felt the record "seems to lack some of the substance of previous albums", while NME's Paolo Hewitt saw "Love and Violence" as "the only riveting piece of music" on a record that veers "from pretty boy pop... to depressing wasteful dirges". Johnny Black of Smash Hits said "the special moments that turn excellence into magic are fewer and further between", but acknowledged the album as an "accessible" work that "still reveals some brave moves". An ardent supporter within the British music press was Record Mirror's Robin Smith, who awarded the album a full five stars, and wrote, "Junk Culture is a living, breathing, musical menagerie filled with a hard core of ideas culled from virtually the four corners of the world... Smooth, warm and powerful." Robin Denselow of The Guardian gave a favourable review that was more indicative of mainstream media opinion, observing a musically diverse record that is "bursting with life and enthusiasm" while offering "an unusual and catchy set of songs".

Internationally, The Sydney Morning Herald's Henry Everingham was pleased that OMD had "finally released an extremely accessible album", on which "nearly every song has the word 'single' stamped". James Muretich of the Calgary Herald wrote that Junk Culture achieves "the kind of glorious fusion of progressive electronic sounds and pop music that marked Architecture & Morality in '81", calling it "a subtle, seductive pop recording with brains to boot". The Ottawa Citizen's Evelyn Erskine noted a musical eclecticism complemented by a "deft use of experimental techniques", asserting, "Of the countless bands that make up the synth-pop invasion, Orchestral Manoeuvres in the Dark has shown a greater ability to progress creatively than most." Marc D. Allan of The Boston Globe said the record had "four potential hits" but is a "hit-or-miss album" overall. Eurotipsheet named Junk Culture "Album of the Week" for 14 May; on 12 November, CMJ reporters named it one of the 10 best recent albums.

Summarising Junk Culture in a retrospective article, SF Weekly's Tim Casagrande dubbed it OMD's "Talking Heads-meets-Kraftwerk album". John Bergstrom of PopMatters referred to "immaculate pop singles... set against an eclectic, equally-accomplished backdrop", while AllMusic's Ned Raggett noted "all the best qualities of OMD at their most accessible — instantly memorable melodies and McCluskey's distinct singing voice, clever but emotional lyrics, and fine playing all around." Kevin Harley of Record Collector saw Junk Culture as "a record flushed with peak-nostalgia tunes", and "a catchy, classy take on mid-80s synthpop uplift". Louder Than War's Paul Scott-Bates described the album as a "triumphant" and "timeless" work.

== Legacy ==
Junk Culture has been listed as one of 1984's best albums. M. Scot Skinner of the Arizona Daily Star and Anne Hull at the St. Petersburg Times ranked it No. 2 and No. 4 respectively, the former observing "an impressively moody collection that displays almost unbelievable pop imagination". The record was placed at No. 386 in CMJ's "Top 1000, 1979–1989". Junk Culture was the focus of the May 2026 instalment of Classic Pop magazine's "Classic Album" series, in which it was described as OMD's "career-saving" record after the commercial disappointment of 1983 predecessor, Dazzle Ships. Tony Kanal of rock band No Doubt declared Junk Culture to be a "great" album, while actor and writer Scott Aukerman cited it as an example of the alternative music that "shaped [his] identity". AllMusic critic Andy Kellman saw "Tesla Girls" as a forebear of the electroclash genre.

McCluskey and Humphreys concede that the response to Dazzle Ships caused OMD to become "safer" in their work, but they nevertheless consider Junk Culture to be a strong album. McCluskey said of the record, "I think it's possibly the tipping point of our career in terms of the quality of our music. It is the catchiest, poppiest album we've ever made, and it's the last one we made where we were in complete control and we had time to do it. Thereafter we were running out of time to make albums. It's an interesting marker in our career."

== Deluxe reissue (2015) ==
A deluxe CD re-issue of Junk Culture was announced via the band's official website and Facebook page on 17 December 2014, and was released on 2 February 2015. The deluxe edition included the remastered original album and a bonus disc with a collection of B-sides and extended mixes, many of which had not been previously released on CD. Five previously unreleased tracks were also featured, including "All or Nothing" with Humphreys on vocals, "10 to 1", and three demos. Fans alerted the group and the label to a number of content errors, prompting Universal Music to re-manufacture the bonus disc. Fans also reported that "Tesla Girls" and "Love and Violence" were different mixes than were featured on the original album, although the main disc was not re-manufactured.

=== Previously unreleased tracks ===
- "10 to 1" is a song with vocals by Andy McCluskey which would later become the album track "Love and Violence" and features some of the same lyrics.
- "All or Nothing" is a slower track featuring Paul Humphreys on vocals.
- "Heaven Is (Highland Studios demo)" – this song was originally played live on OMD's showcase tour in the autumn of 1983 – as were tracks such as "Junk Culture", "Tesla Girls" and "Never Turn Away" – but never made it to the album ("Heaven Is" also nearly made 1986 studio album The Pacific Age). A new version was included on the studio album Liberator (1993).
- "Tesla Girls (Highland Studios demo)"/"White Trash (Highland Studios demo)" – both songs eventually made it onto the album.

B-sides "The Avenue", "Wrappup", the re-recorded version of "Julia's Song" and extended mixes of "Tesla Girls", "Never Turn Away" and "Talking Loud and Clear" were available on CD for the first time.

=== "Julia's Song (Dub Version)" 10-inch single ===
"Julia's Song (Dub Version)" was kept as a limited-edition 10-inch release for the 2015 Record Store Day. It is the same track as the first part of "Julia's Song (Extended Version)", B-side to the 1984 "Talking Loud and Clear" 12-inch single, the second part of which was included on the Junk Culture deluxe edition bonus CD. The track "10 to 1" was used as the B-side to this release. The original version of "Julia's Song" appears on the band's debut studio album Orchestral Manoeuvres in the Dark (1980).

== Track listing ==
- All songs written by OMD.
- The US release has a modified track listing, shifting "Junk Culture" to track 3, between "Locomotion" and "Apollo", therefore opening with "Tesla Girls".
- Writing credits below from ASCAP database.

Side one
No.	Title	Writer(s)	Length
1.	"Junk Culture"	Paul Humphreys; Andy McCluskey	4:06
2.	"Tesla Girls"	Humphreys; McCluskey	3:51
3.	"Locomotion"	Humphreys; McCluskey; Gordian Troeller	3:53
4.	"Apollo"	McCluskey	3:39
5.	"Never Turn Away"	Humphreys; McCluskey	3:57

Side two
No.	Title	Writer(s)	Length
6.	"Love and Violence"	Humphreys; McCluskey	4:40
7.	"Hard Day"	Humphreys; McCluskey	5:59
8.	"All Wrapped Up"	Humphreys; McCluskey	4:25
9.	"White Trash"	Humphreys; McCluskey; Martin Cooper	4:35
10.	"Talking Loud and Clear"	Humphreys; McCluskey; Cooper	4:20
Total length:			43:05

Side three (free one-sided 7-inch single included with initial pressing of the album)
No.	Title	Writer(s)	Length
11.	"(The Angels Keep Turning) The Wheels of the Universe"	OMD	4:54

Bonus tracks on 2015 CD reissue: Disc two
No.	Title	Writer(s)	Length
1.	"Her Body in My Soul" (B-side of "Locomotion")	OMD	4:41
2.	"The Avenue" (B-side of "Locomotion")	OMD	4:10
3.	"Julia's Song (Re-Record)" (B-side of "Talking Loud and Clear")	Humphreys; McCluskey; Julia Kneale	4:18
4.	"Garden City" (B-side of "Tesla Girls")	OMD	4:04
5.	"Wrappup" (remix of "All Wrapped Up", B-side of "Never Turn Away")	Humphreys; McCluskey	4:01
6.	"Locomotion" (12" Version)	Humphreys; McCluskey; Troeller	5:17
7.	"Tesla Girls" (12" Version; also known as 'Extended Version')	Humphreys; McCluskey	4:31
8.	"Talking Loud and Clear" (12" Version; also known as 'Extended Version')	Humphreys; McCluskey; Cooper	6:12
9.	"Never Turn Away" (12" Version; also known as 'Extended Version')	Humphreys; McCluskey	6:29
10.	"(The Angels Keep Turning) The Wheels of the Universe"	OMD	4:54
11.	"10 to 1"	OMD	4:07
12.	"All or Nothing"	OMD	3:44
13.	"Heaven Is (Highland Studios demo)"	OMD	6:09
14.	"Tesla Girls (Highland Studios demo)"	Humphreys; McCluskey	4:01
15.	"White Trash (Highland Studios demo)"	Humphreys; McCluskey; Cooper	3:39

(Tracks 11–15 previously unreleased)

== Personnel ==
Orchestral Manoeuvres in the Dark (OMD)

- Paul Humphreys — vocals, Roland Jupiter-8, E-mu Emulator, Korg M-500 Micro Preset, acoustic piano, Fairlight CMI, celeste, Prophet 5
- Andy McCluskey — vocals, bass guitar, guitar, Roland Jupiter-8, E-mu Emulator, Fairlight CMI, Latin percussion
- Martin Cooper — Prophet 5, E-mu Emulator, tenor and soprano saxophones, Roland SH2, marimba
- Malcolm Holmes — acoustic and electronic drums, Latin percussion, drum computer programming

Additional musicians

- Gordan Troeller — piano on "Locomotion", Roland Jupiter-8 on "White Trash"
- Maureen Humphreys — vocals on "Tesla Girls"
- Jan Faas, Jan Vennik, Bart van Lier — brass section on "Locomotion" and "All Wrapped Up"
- Tony Visconti — brass arrangements on "Locomotion" and "All Wrapped Up"
- Bob Ludwig — mastering

== Charts ==
=== Weekly charts ===
Weekly chart performance for Junk Culture
Chart (1984)	Peak position
Australian Albums (Kent Music Report)	54
Canada Top Albums/CDs (RPM)	74
Dutch Albums (Album Top 100)	12
European Albums (Music & Media)	14
German Albums (Offizielle Top 100)	32
Spanish Albums (AFYVE)	27
Swedish Albums (Sverigetopplistan)	32
Swiss Albums (Schweizer Hitparade)	28
UK Albums (Official Charts)	9
US Billboard 200	182

=== Year-end charts ===
Year-end chart performance for Junk Culture
Chart (1984)	Position
Dutch Albums (Album Top 100)	47
UK Albums (Gallup)	84

== Certifications ==
Certifications for Junk Culture
Region	Certification	Certified units/sales
United Kingdom (BPI)	Gold	100,000^{^}
^{^} Shipments figures based on certification alone.
