= Telegraph (song) =

Single by Orchestral Manoeuvres in the Dark

from the album Dazzle Ships
- B-side: "66 and Fading"
- Released: 1 April 1983
- Recorded: The Manor (Shipton-on-Cherwell, Oxfordshire, England])
- Genre: New wave
- Length: 2:57; 5:53 (extended version)
- Label: Telegraph (Virgin)
- Songwriters: Andy McCluskey; Paul Humphreys
- Producers: OMD; Rhett Davies

Orchestral Manoeuvres in the Dark singles chronology
"Genetic Engineering" (1983)	"Telegraph" (1983)	"Locomotion" (1984)

Music video
- "Telegraph" on YouTube

"Telegraph" is a song by the English electronic band Orchestral Manoeuvres in the Dark (OMD), and the second single from their fourth studio album Dazzle Ships (1983). "Telegraph" was originally slated to be the first single released, but being unhappy with the mix and with pressure from Virgin, the group instead opted for "Genetic Engineering".

The first OMD release in the wake of Dazzle Ships' critical panning, "Telegraph" also met with hostility from the music press. It has since been positively reappraised by outlets including Rolling Stone, who recognised the track as "decades ahead of its time" and one of the "100 Best Songs of 1983". "Telegraph" was the band's first single not to enter the UK Top 20 since "Red Frame/White Light" in early 1980. The song was included on the CD and cassette versions of the band's first singles compilation album The Best of OMD in 1988 (in a remix unique to that release), but was omitted from their second singles compilation The OMD Singles in 1998.

== Background ==
The song was first recorded in 1981 at The Manor Studios and had been under consideration for their previous studio album Architecture & Morality. The lyrics on the original 1981 version and the 1983 version are different in places, reflecting the harder edge the original version presented. The 1981 version was released on the 2008 re-released Dazzle Ships album as a bonus track. The original inspiration for "Telegraph" came from Andy McCluskey's strong feelings against politics and religion at the time. These motifs were weakened for the version on Dazzle Ships.

== Critical reception and legacy ==
The first OMD release in the wake of parent album Dazzle Ships' critical panning, "Telegraph" also received negative appraisals. Mike Gardner of Record Mirror described the song as "a well-recorded piece of nonsense that doesn't show any ideas apart from starting and ending", while Smash Hits journalist Dave Rimmer called it "jolly, jangly, deliberately obscure and dull as proverbial dishwater". Philippa Hawker of The Age was more favourable, observing "wonderfully hysterical electropop" that deals with "the relationship between the medium and the message".

In a retrospective review, AllMusic's Stewart Mason hailed the single as "insanely catchy" and "brilliant, a tongue-in-cheek ode to an all-but-obsolete technology that had once been state of the art." He added, "As the state-of-1983 electronics of the arrangement sound more and more quaint, the irony grows sharper." John Doran of The Quietus viewed the song as "perhaps the apex of [OMD's] achievements in painting vignettes of love and yearning in an age where society dictates that lovers are often apart." Rolling Stone ranked the track among the "100 Best Songs of 1983", with critic Rob Sheffield writing, "'Telegraph' is the crown jewel [of Dazzle Ships], a satire of how people keep falling for the utopian promises of new social media. (Talk about a song that's decades ahead of its time.)" Classic Pop editor Ian Peel favoured the extended 12" version, in which he felt the track "truly came alive".

American indie rock musician Telekinesis cited "Telegraph" as a key influence during the making of his fourth studio album Ad Infinitum (2015).

== B-side ==
A new song entitled "66 and Fading" features as the B-side to both the 7" and 12" releases of "Telegraph". The long instrumental track continues the band tradition of including more experimental songs as B-sides. The track was not featured on Dazzle Ships and remained exclusive to this release until the inclusion of an edited version in the Navigation: The OMD B-Sides album in 2001 and then reinstated to its full length on the remastered special edition of Dazzle Ships in 2008.

"66 and Fading" is composed of the same chords as the track "Silent Running" (included on Dazzle Ships) but reversed and slowed down.

== Track listing ==
=== 7" vinyl single and 7" picture disc ===
- UK: Telegraph VS 580
- UK: Telegraph VSY 580

Side one

1. "Telegraph" (Paul Humphreys, Andy McCluskey) – 2:57

Side two

1. "66 and Fading" (Humphreys, McCluskey) – 6:31

=== 12" vinyl single (extended version) ===
- UK: Telegraph VS 580-12

Side one

1. "Telegraph" (extended version) (Humphreys, McCluskey) – 5:53

Side two

1. "66 and Fading" (Humphreys, McCluskey) – 6:31

== Charts ==
Chart (1983)	Peak position
Ireland (IRMA)	28
UK Singles (Official Charts)	42
US Mainstream Rock (Billboard)	32
West Germany (GfK)	39

== Live versions ==
A live version of the song recorded at the Hammersmith Odeon, London was released as the B-side of the "Tesla Girls" single in 1984. The song was not included in the set list of the special live performance of Dazzle Ships at the Museum of Liverpool in November 2014, although was reintroduced into the live performances of the album in London and Germany in 2016.
