= Talking Loud and Clear =

Single by Orchestral Manoeuvres in the Dark

from the album Junk Culture
- B-side: "Julia's Song"
- Released: 4 June 1984
- Studio: AIR (Salem, Montserrat)
- Genre: New wave
- Length: 4:20 (album mix); 3:53 (7" mix); 8:50 (extended version)
- Label: Virgin
- Songwriters: Paul Humphreys; Andy McCluskey; Martin Cooper
- Producers: Orchestral Manoeuvres in the Dark; Brian Tench

Orchestral Manoeuvres in the Dark singles chronology
"Locomotion" (1984)	"Talking Loud and Clear" (1984)	"Tesla Girls" (1984)

Music video
- "Talking Loud and Clear" on YouTube

"Talking Loud and Clear" is a song by the English electronic band Orchestral Manoeuvres in the Dark (OMD), released on 4 June 1984 as the second single from their fifth studio album Junk Culture (1984). The single was a European hit, reaching the Top 10 in Ireland, Belgium and the Netherlands, and No. 11 in the UK. It also charted at No. 18 in Germany. The song was edited for its 7" single release.

A 12" extended version was also issued. The remix is effectively divided into two parts starting with a solely instrumental section followed by a section featuring vocals and instrumentation, the whole piece lasting over eight minutes. The extended version featured on the deluxe remastered release of Junk Culture in 2015 features the second part only. The full extended recording is featured on So80s presents Orchestral Manoeuvres in the Dark released in 2011.

The 7" version of "Talking Loud and Clear" is featured on all OMD singles and greatest hits compilations.

Simon Milne filmed the official music video.

== Critical reception ==
Brian Chin of Billboard referred to "Talking Loud and Clear" as a "very attractive pop song". As a guest singles reviewer in Smash Hits, Duran Duran bassist John Taylor described the track as "very charming" and a "good record". "Talking Loud and Clear" was popular among WLIR listeners, who voted it "Screamer of the Week".

In a retrospective appraisal, Dave Thompson of AllMusic observed a "lovely" single with "deftly penned" lyrics. Classic Pop critic John Earls noted a "beautiful" and "remarkable" song whose "Roxy Music levels of poise and melody should be as celebrated as [OMD's] "Enola Gay" and "Joan of Arc". Radio X included "Talking Loud and Clear" in "The 25 Best Indie Songs of 1984".

== B-side ==
The B-side, "Julia's Song", is a radically different version from the same song recorded for the group's debut studio album Orchestral Manoeuvres in the Dark in 1980. This is a reworked version with newly recorded vocals, a slower tempo and brass added by the Weir Brothers more in line with the style of other tracks on Junk Culture. An extended version was issued for the 12" release and like the extended version of "Talking Loud and Clear" is divided into two parts. The second part features on the bonus disc of the deluxe remastered version of Junk Culture in 2015. The first part was issued as a 10" single for Record Store Day in 2015 under the title "Julia's Song (Dub Version)".

== Track listing ==
7" and 7" picture disc

1. "Talking Loud and Clear" – 3:53
2. "Julia's Song" – 4:17

12"

1. "Talking Loud and Clear" (extended version) – 8:50
2. "Julia's Song" (extended version) – 8:33

== Charts ==
=== Weekly charts ===
Chart (1984)	Peak position
Belgium (Ultratop 50 Flanders)	6
Europe (European Hot 100 Singles)	18
Ireland (IRMA)	9
Netherlands (Dutch Top 40)	5
Netherlands (Single Top 100)	6
UK Singles (Official Charts)	11
West Germany (GfK)	18

=== Year-end charts ===
Chart (1984)	Position
Belgium (Ultratop 50 Flanders)	72
Netherlands (Dutch Top 40)	68

== Live recordings ==
A live performance of "Talking Loud and Clear" recorded at Solihull NEC in December 1993 was issued on the limited edition CD single of "Universal" in 1996. The song was also part of the concert performed with the Royal Liverpool Philharmonic Orchestra on 20 June 2009 at the Philharmonic Hall in Liverpool as documented by the Electricity DVD (2009).
