= USS Avis =

Patrol vessel of the United States Navy

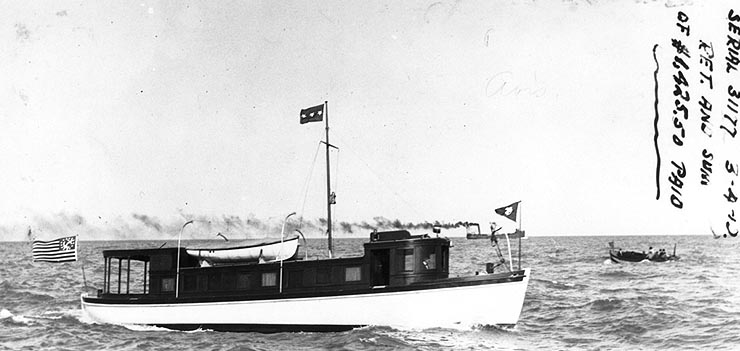
- Avis as a private motorboat, underway on the Great Lakes sometime between 1908 and 1917.

History

United States
- Name: USS Avis
- Namesake: Previous name retained
- Builder: Berger, Manitowoc, Wisconsin
- Completed: 1908
- Acquired: 28 July 1917
- Commissioned: 28 July 1917
- Decommissioned: 15 November 1918
- Stricken: 15 November 1918
- Fate: Returned to owners 15 November 1918
- Notes: Operated as private motorboat Avis 1908-1917 and from 1918

General characteristics
- Type: Patrol vessel
- Tonnage: 17 gross register tons
- Length: 52 ft (16 m)
- Beam: 11 ft 6 in (3.51 m)
- Draft: 4 ft (1.2 m) aft
- Speed: 10 knots
- Complement: 8
- Armament: 1 × 1-pounder gun; 1 × machine gun; 5 rifles

USS Avis (SP-382) was a patrol vessel that served in the United States Navy from 1917 to 1918.

== Construction and acquisition ==
Avis was built as a private motorboat of the same name in 1908 by Berger at Manitowoc, Wisconsin. On 28 July 1917, the U.S. Navy acquired her from her owners, Richard W. Phillips and H. R. Phillips, for use as a patrol boat during World War I. She was commissioned as USS Avis (SP-382) the same day.

== Operational history ==
Assigned to the 9th, 10th, and 11th Naval Districts – a single administrative entity created by the almagation of the 9th Naval District, 10th Naval District, and 11th Naval District -- Avis departed Waukegan, Illinois, in September 1917 to take up section patrol duties at the section headquarters at Sault Ste. Marie, Michigan, from which she patrolled the canal system connecting Lake Superior and Lake Huron. She moved to Detroit, Michigan, on 10 November 1917 to prepare to be laid up over the winter of 1917-1918 while the Great Lakes were frozen over. On 15 November 1917 she turned over her logbooks to the section commander at Detroit and became inactive for the winter.

On 9 May 1918, the training ship USS Isla de Luzon departed Detroit with Avis under tow, bound for Sault Ste. Marie, where they arrived on 12 May 1918. Avis then began reactivation there, and resumed her patrols of the Sault Ste. Marie canal system on 1 June 1918. She continued them until the end of World War I on 11 November 1918.

== Disposal ==
Avis was decommissioned, stricken from the Navy List, and returned to her owners on 15 November 1918.
