= Avenues (band) =

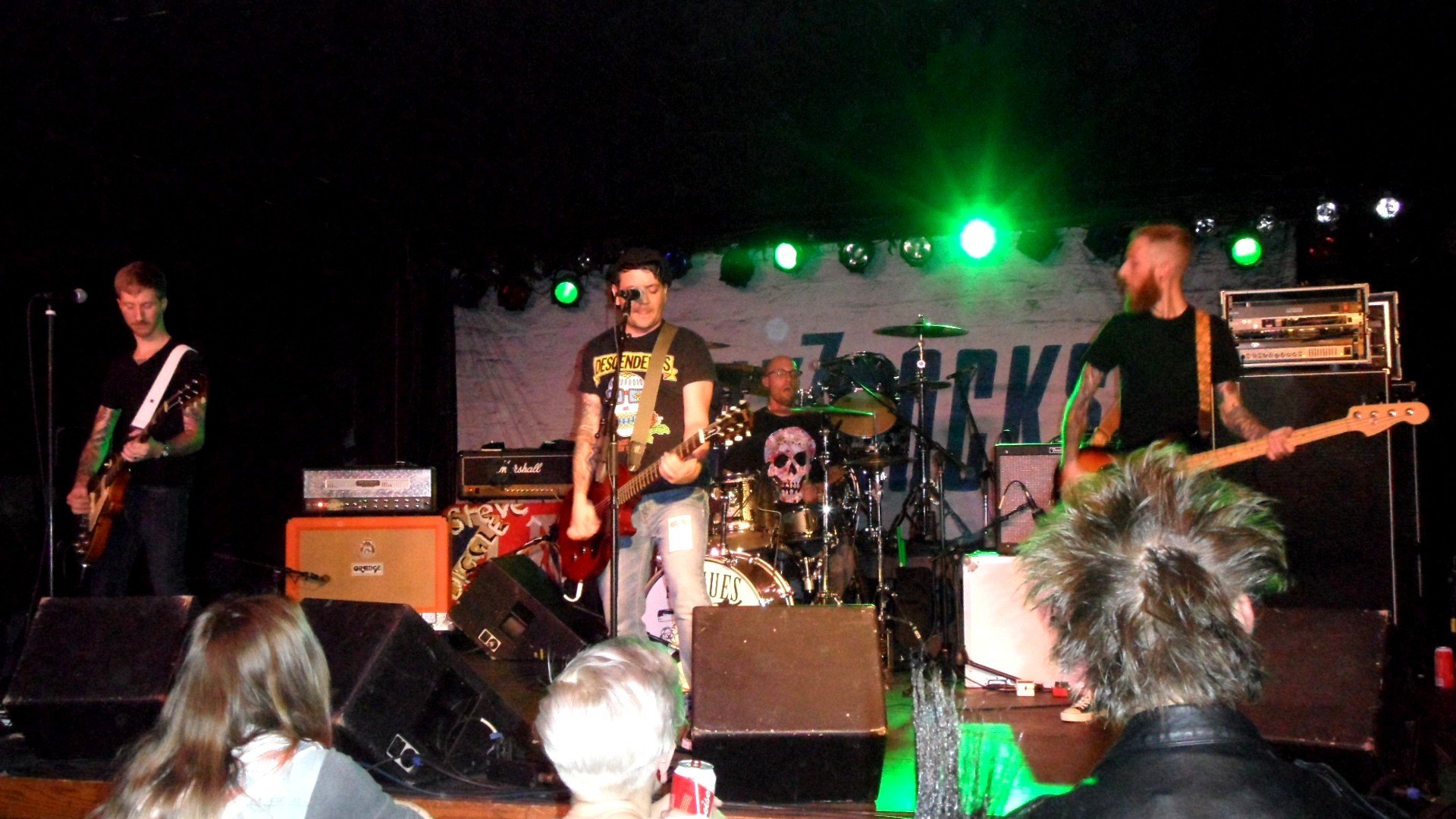

Background information
- Origin: Milwaukee, Wisconsin, USA
- Genres: Punk rock, pop punk
- Years active: 2006–present
- Labels: Wiretap Records, Sbam Records, Stayposi Records, Gas Can Music,
- Members: Vin Smith; Shawn Brooks; Scott Brooks; Marc Perez
- Past members: Joel Maske

Avenues is a punk rock band formed in Milwaukee, Wisconsin, in 2006.

The band consists of Vin Smith, Shawn Brooks, Scott Brooks and Marc Perez. Marc replaced original drummer Joel Maske in November 2015. Avenues latest albums, "Creep Show" and "Post Cards from Ann Arbor", were recorded with producer Matt Allison at Atlas Studios in Chicago, IL, known for producing acts such as Alkaline Trio and The Lawrence Arms. Their sound has been described as midwestern punk.

Their song "Hold Me" was featured on episode 2 of the MTV reality series The Real World: St. Thomas in 2012.

Avenues have performed at major music festivals, Punk Rock Bowling Music Festival, Envol et Macadam, Summerfest and played shows with acts such as, Buzzcocks, Bob Mould, Rise Against, Strung Out, Teenage Bottlerocket, Less Than Jake, 88 Fingers Louie, Pulley, Masked Intruder, Red City Radio, The Gamits, Mustard Plug, and Direct Hit.

== Discography ==
=== EPs ===
- NoHo (2012, Gas Can Music)
- Postcards From Ann Arbor (2013, Stayposi Records)
- Creep Show (2015, Wiretap Records)

=== LPs ===
- We’re All Doomed (2021, Wiretap Records, Sbam Records)

=== Compilation appearances ===
- Music With Meaning: Vol 1 (2013, Stayposi Records)
  - Features the track "Hold Me"
- Wiretap:Connected Vol 2 (2015, Wiretap Records)
  - Features the track "Messin' Around"
- Another Wiretap Records Comp Vol 3 (2015, Wiretap Records)
  - Features the track "Rad Rad Ebola"
- "ATTENTION: A Wiretap Records Compilation" (2015, Wiretap Records)
  - Features the track "She's Out Of Sight"
- "ATTENTION: A Wiretap Records Fall 2015 Compilation" (2015, Wiretap Records)
  - Features the track "Hipster 101"

=== Splits/singles ===
- Jumping Ship (2014, digital split with Jetty Boys)
