= Kuando el rey Nimrod =

Sephardic folk song

"Kuando el rey Nimrod" (קואנדו אל ריי נמרוד, Ladino pronunciation: [ˈkwando el rei nimˈroð], or [nimˈrod] modern Spanish spelling: Cuando el Rey Nimrod; "When King Nimrod") is a Sephardic folk song. It is sung in the Judaeo-Spanish language and tells the story of the birth of Abraham, the father of the Jewish people and of monotheism.

== History ==
In contrast to a popular misconception, "Kuando el rey Nimrod" is not a song that dates from the times when the Jews lived in Spain and Portugal in the Middle Ages, and has its roots in a piyyut called La vocación de Abraham, of which several versions have been found that date from the 18th century and were written by anonymous authors in the former Ottoman Empire. The song, with its original much longer lyrics and its makam-based structure, became popular in the Sephardic communities of the Mediterranean basin. Around the year 1890, an anonymous author from Tangiers, Morocco wrote a different version of the song, shortening its lyrics and composing a new melody in maqam Hejaz. This reduced and catchier version survived to our days to become arguably the most popular song in the Sephardic repertoire, becoming a staple for Ladino singers such as Yehoram Gaon and Fortuna, and even for some Klezmer bands when they want to include a Sephardic song in their repertoire.

== Interpretations ==
Anachronistically, Abraham—who in the Bible is the very first Jew and the ancestor of all who followed, hence his appellation "Avinu" (Our Father)— is depicted as being born in the juderia (modern Spanish: judería, Judaeo-Spanish: djudería), the Jewish quarter. Abraham became the first Jew by acknowledging the existence of one God. Abraham in the Bible is the very first man to be circumcised and perform circumcision.

Much of this story is based on the account of Abraham's life written in the book "Maaseh Avraham Avinu Alav HaShalom" as well as the Midrash regarding the furnace and Zohar concerning Elijah the Prophet.

== Lyrics ==
Kuando el rei Nimrod al kampo salia
mirava en el sielo i en la estreyeria
vido una lus santa en la juderia
Ke avia de naser Avraham Avinu.

Chorus:
Avraham Avinu, Padre kerido
Padre bendicho, lus de Israel.

Luego a las komadres enkomendava
Ke toda mujer ke prenyada kedara
si paria un ijo, al punto la matara
Ke avia de naser Avraham Avinu.

La mujer de Terah kedo prenyada
i de dia en dia el le preguntava (or demandava)
"¿De ke teneix la kara tan demudada?"
Eya ya savia el bien ke tenia.

En fin de mueve mezes parir keria
iva caminando por kampos i vinyas,
a su marido tal ni le descubria
topo una meara, ayi lo pariria

En akella ora el nasido avlava:
"Anda vos, la mi madre, de la meara,
yo ya topo kien m'alechara,
Malah de sielo me acompanyara
porke so criado del Dio bendicho."

En fin de veinte dias lo fue a visitar,
lo vido d'enfrente, mansevo saltar,
mirando al cielo y bien atinar,
para conoser el Dio de la verdad.

"Madre, la mi madre, ke buscaix aqui?
Un ijo presiado pari yo aki.
Vine a buscarlo, si se topa aqui,
si esta bivo me konsolare yo."

"Madre, la mi madre, ke avlaix?
Un ijo presiado, komo lo dexaix?
A fin de veinte dias, como lo vizitaix?
¡Yo so vuestro ijo presiado!"

Mirad la mi madre, que el Dío es uno,
él crio los cielos uno per uno.
Dizedle a Nimrod que perdio su tino
porke no quiere creer en el Verdadero.

Lo alcanzó a saver el rey Nimrod esto,
"¡dixo que lo traigan aina y presto
antes que desreinen a todo el resto
y dexen a mi ya crean en el Verdadero!"

Ya me lo truxeron con grande albon
y el travó de la silla un buen travon.
"¿Di, raxa—por que te tienes tu por Dío?
¿Por que no quieres creer en el Verdadero?"

"¡Acendiendo un horno, bien acendido,
echadlo presto qu'es entendido!
Llevadlo con trabucos, qu'es agudo,
si d'aqui el Dío lo escapa, es el Verdadero."

Echandolo al horno, iva caminando,
con los malakhim iva paseando,
y todos los lenyos fruto ivan dando;
d'aqui conocemos al Dío verdadero.

Grande zekhut tiene el senyor Avraham,
que por él conocemos el Dío de la verdad.
Grande zekhut tiene el senyor parido,
que afirma la mitsvá de Avraham Avinu.

Saludemos agora al senyor parido,
que le sea besiman-tov este nacido,
qu'Eliahu ha-Navi mos sea aparecido,
y daremos loores al Verdadero.

Saludemos agora al compadre [sandak] y tambien al mohel
que por su Zekhut mos venga
el Goel y Rahma a todo Yisrael,
cierto loaremos al Verdadero.

Translation:

When King Nimrod went out to the countryside
He was looking at heaven and at the stars
He saw a holy light in the Jewish quarter
[A sign] that Abraham, our father, was about to be born.

Chorus:
Abraham our Father, beloved father,
Blessed father, light of Israel.

Then he told the midwives
That every woman who was still pregnant
If she gave birth to a male child at once he will be killed
because Abraham our father was about to be born.

Terach's wife was pregnant
and each day he would ask her
"Why do you look so pale?"
She already knew the blessing that she had.

At the end of nine months she wanted to give birth,
She walked through fields and vineyards
She didn't tell her husband anything,
She found a cave; there, she would give birth.

At that time the newborn spoke:
"Walk away from the cave, my mother
I have already found someone who will take me away.
An angel from heaven will accompany me
Because I am a child of the blessed God."

After twenty days she went to visit him.
She saw in front of her a young man leaping,
Looking at the sky and (looking carefully/noticing everything),
In order to know the God of Truth.

"Mother, my mother, what are you looking for here?"
"I gave birth to a precious son here.
I came to look for him here, if he is still here.
If he is alive I will be consoled."

"Mother, my mother, what are you saying?
How could you leave your precious son?
After twenty days how is it that you're visiting him?
I am your precious son!

"Look, mother: God is one,
He created the heavens one by one.
Tell Nimrod that he has lost his mind
Because he does not want to believe in the True One."

The knowledge [of Abraham's birth] reached King Nimrod.
"Bring him here immediately
Before everyone else rebels
And say to me they already believe in the True One!"

They brought him in great humility.
He strongly seized the throne.
"Tell me, evil one: why do you think you are God?"
Why do you not wish to believe in the True One?"

"Light a fiery furnace,
Throw in the one who has learned immediately!
Protect yourself from him because he is sharp.
If God allows him to escape from here, then He is the Real One."

Thrown into the furnace, he walked
With the angels he wandered.
All the firewood gave forth fruit,
And that is how we know the true God.

Great merit has honorable Abraham
Because of him we recognize the true God.
Great merit has the father of the newborn
Who fulfills the commandment of Abraham our father (circumcision).

We greet now the father of the newborn
We wish this newborn has been born under a good sign (siman tov).
Because Elijah the Prophet appeared to us
And we will give praises to the True One.

We greet now the godfather and also the circumciser,
Because of his merit the Redeemer and Merciful One [God] will come to all Israel,
Sure of this, we will praise the True One.
