= Mary McIntyre (photographer) =

- Education: University of Ulster
- Occupation: Artist
- Known for: Photography; Landscape painting
- Website: marymcintyre.org

Mary McIntyre is an artist who uses photography. She is a Reader in Fine Art at the University of Ulster at Belfast. Her work has been exhibited at international exhibitions such as the Venice Biennale, 2005.

Between 2000 and 2004 McIntyre's work focused on interior spaces that had been forgotten and overlooked, her images conveying the atmospheres that resonated from the institutional spaces she photographed. From 2005 onwards McIntyre shifted the focus of her work to the subject of landscape. Her imagery explores the relationship between landscape painting and photography. Her current work examines the sublime and picturesque in 18th-century European landscape painting.

In her more recent work McIntyre has incorporated installation, using large-scale 3-d forms to accompany the exhibition of her photography.

Mary McIntyre is also founder of independent record label, TONN Recordings, which specialises in electronic music.

== Background ==
Mary McIntyre was born in Coleraine, Northern Ireland. She studied Fine Art at the University of Ulster where she obtained a master's degree in Fine Art. She lives and works in Belfast.
