= Auster Avis =

Four-seat light aircraft

Avis

General information
- Type: Utility aircraft
- Manufacturer: Auster
- Number built: 2

History
- First flight: late 1947
- Developed from: Auster Autocrat

The Auster Avis was a four-seat light aircraft developed from the Auster Autocrat. It featured a redesigned fuselage incorporating four doors and a circular cross-section towards the tail, new undercarriage, and new wing flaps. It was planned in two versions, the Mk 1 for civil use, and the Mk 2 for military and air ambulance duties. However, only two prototypes were built, and Auster abandoned the project in favour of the Auster J-5 Autocar.

== Specifications (Avis) ==
Data from Jane's all the World's Aircraft 1949-50, The Incomplete Guide to Airfoil Usage

General characteristics

- Crew: 1
- Capacity: 3 passengers
- Length: 23 ft 7 in (7.18 m)
- Wingspan: 36 ft 4 in (11.07 m)
- Height: 6 ft 5.5 in (1.97 m) tail down, propeller horizontal
- Wing area: 185 sq ft (17.2 m^{2})
- Aspect ratio: 6.982
- Airfoil: NACA 23012
- Empty weight: 1,480 lb (671 kg)
- Gross weight: 2,550 lb (1,157 kg)
- Fuel capacity: Fuel:34 imp gal (41 US gal; 150 L) in two wing root fuel tanks; Oil:3 imp gal (3.6 US gal; 14 L) aft of engine.
- Powerplant: 1 × de Havilland Gipsy Major 10 4-cylinder inverted air-cooled in-line piston engine, 145 hp (108 kW) maximum at 2,550rpm; 108 hp (81 kW) continuous at 2,300 rpm
- Propellers: 2-bladed Weybridge wooden fixed pitch propeller

Performance

- Maximum speed: 115 mph (185 km/h, 100 kn) fully loaded
- Cruise speed: 100 mph (160 km/h, 87 kn) fully loaded
- Stall speed: 40 mph (64 km/h, 35 kn) fully loaded, flaps down
- Range: 500 mi (800 km, 430 nmi) fully loaded in still-air
- Service ceiling: 12,000 ft (3,700 m) fully loaded
- Rate of climb: 510 ft/min (2.6 m/s) fully loaded
- Wing loading: 13.8 lb/sq ft (67 kg/m^{2}) fully loaded
- Fuel consumption mpg: 13 1/3 mpg_{‑imp} (4.7 km/L)
- Fuel consumption: 0.525 lb/mi (0.148 kg/km)
- Power/mass: 17.5 lb/hp (10.6 kg/kW) fully loaded at 2,300 rpm; 14.9 lb/hp (9.1 kg/kW) at 2,200 rpm
- Take-off run: 185 yd (169 m) in 5 mph (4.3 kn; 8.0 km/h) wind
- Landing run: 130 yd (120 m) in 5 mph (4.3 kn; 8.0 km/h) wind
