= Artists' Vocal Ensemble =

Artists’ Vocal Ensemble (AVE) is a professional choral ensemble directed by early music specialist Jonathan Dimmock. AVE has become known in the San Francisco Bay Area for presenting sacred polyphony for today’s spiritual seekers.

Founded on St Cecilia's Day 2004, AVE brings to life many of the masterworks from the Renaissance and Tudor periods. While presenting programs of scholarly interest, AVE strives to create experiences that are emotional, spiritual, and contemplative.

== Current vocalists ==
- Sopranos: Victoria Fraser, Bethany Hill, Yuhi Aizawa Combatti,
- Altos: Heidi Waterman, Celeste Winant, James Apgar, Clifton Massey
- Tenors: Sam W. Smith, Steven Ziegler, David Kurtenbach, Neal Rogers
- Basses: Nicholas Grishkoff, Josh Henderson, Micah Epps, Chung Wai Soong
