= The Avenues =

The Avenues may refer to:

- The Avenues, Salt Lake City, a neighbourhood in Salt Lake City, Utah
- The Avenues, Harare, a suburb of Harare, Zimbabwe
- The Avenues (gang), a street gang in Los Angeles County, California
- The Avenues (Jacksonville), a shopping mall in Jacksonville, Florida
- The Avenues (Kuwait), the largest shopping mall in Kuwait and second largest in the Middle East
- The Avenues (Riyadh), a mixed-use development and shopping mall in Riyadh, Saudi Arabia
- The Avenues, Bahrain, a shopping mall in Manama, Bahrain
- The Avenues, Kingston upon Hull, an area in the city of Kingston upon Hull, England

== See also ==
- The Avenue, a British rugby stadium
- Avenue (disambiguation)
