= Avis Dam =

Dam outside of Windhoek, Namibia

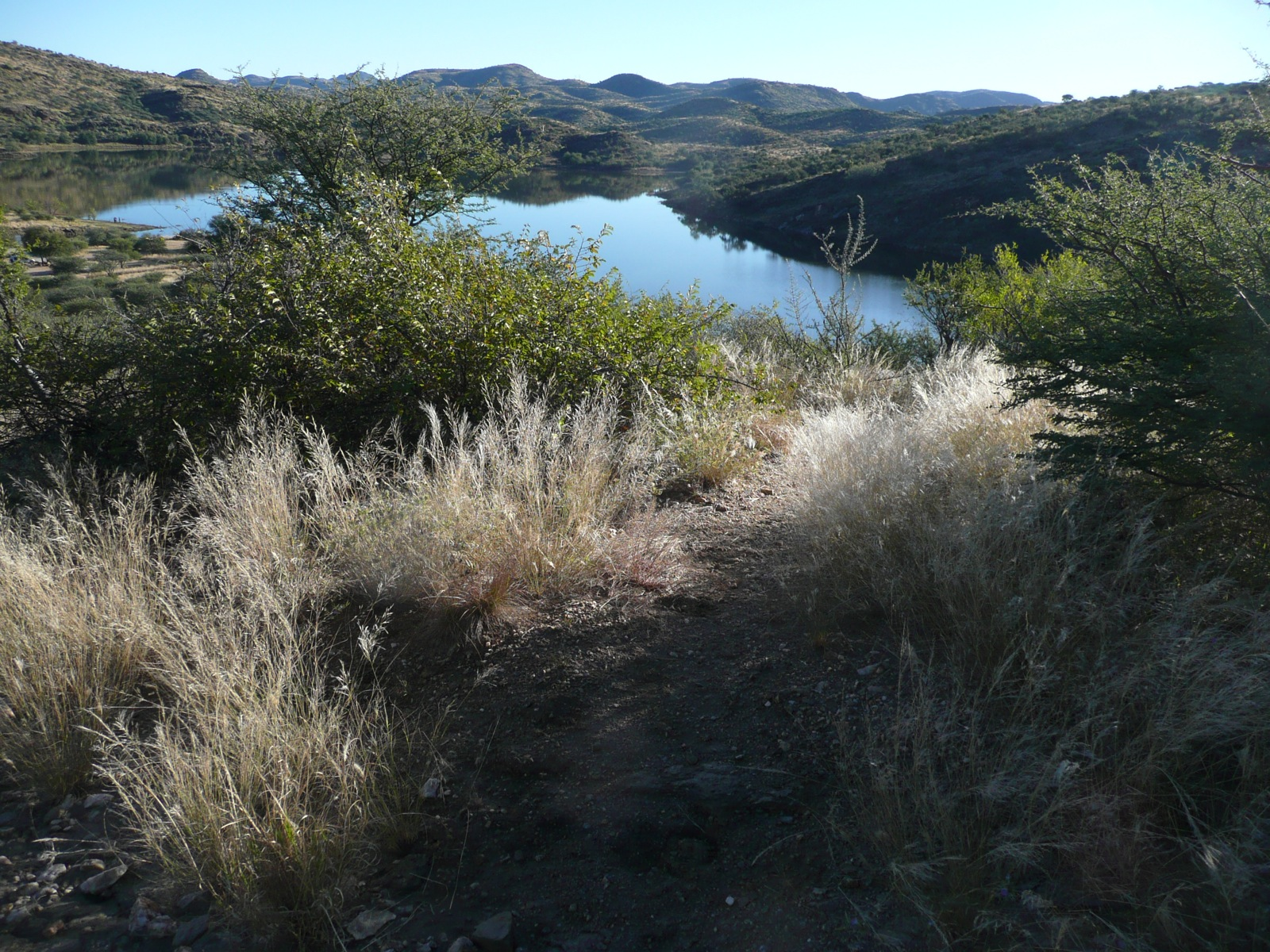
- Avis Dam in April 2009
- Interactive map of Avis Dam
- Country: Namibia
- Coordinates: 22°34′29.16″S 17°7′45.62″E
- Status: Operational
- Opening date: 1933
- Built by: South West Africa Administration
- Owner: Windhoek Municipality
- Website http://www.avisdam.org/

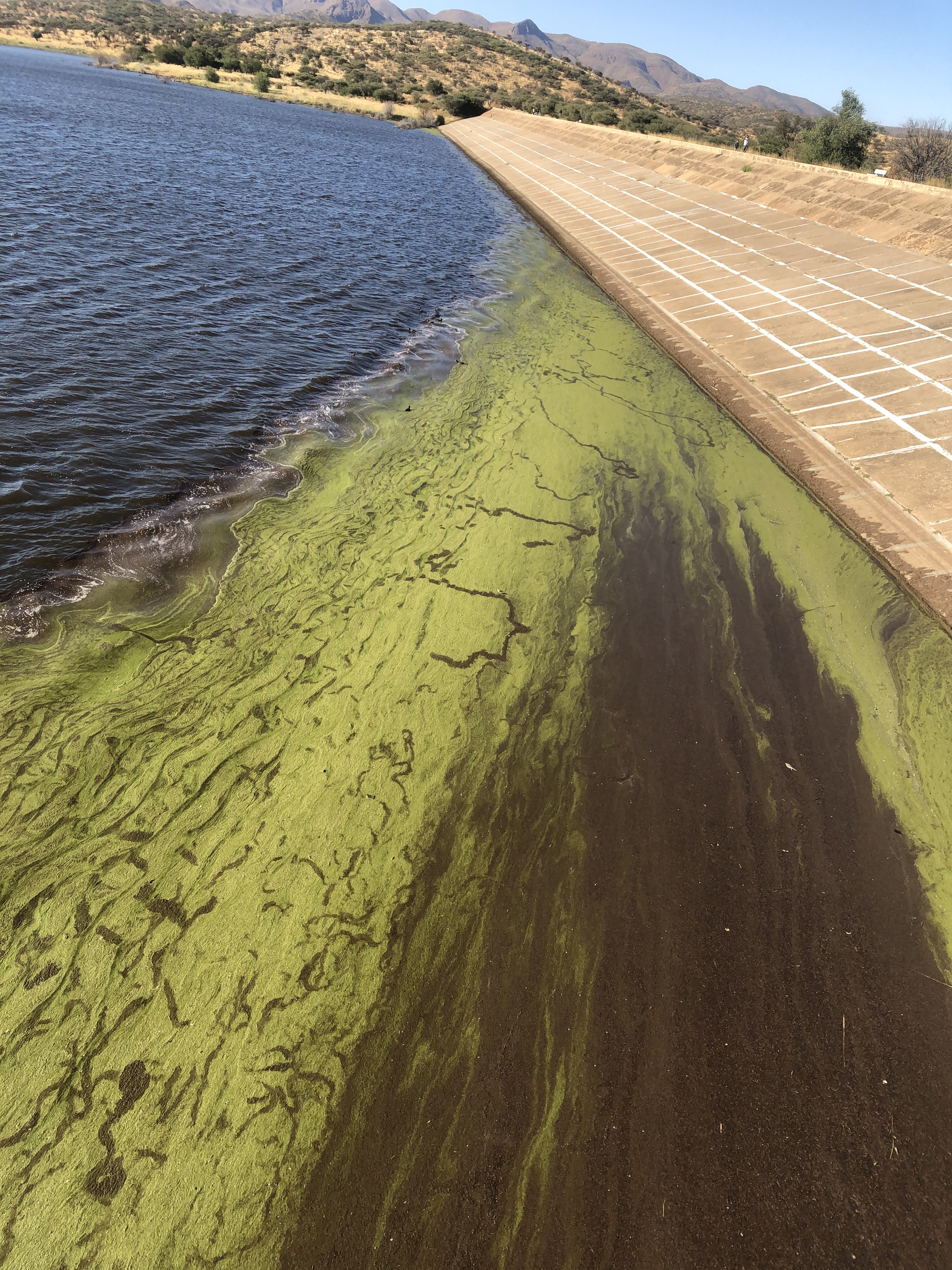
Algae covering water at Avis Dam

Video footage of the Avis Dam

The Avis Dam is a dam outside of Windhoek, Namibia. It was built in 1933 by the South African colonial authorities. It first flooded in April 1934, but only exceeded 75% again in 2007.

== Fauna ==
There are at least 187 different species of birds in the area.
