= L'Avenue =

Mixed use skyscraper complex in Montreal, Quebec

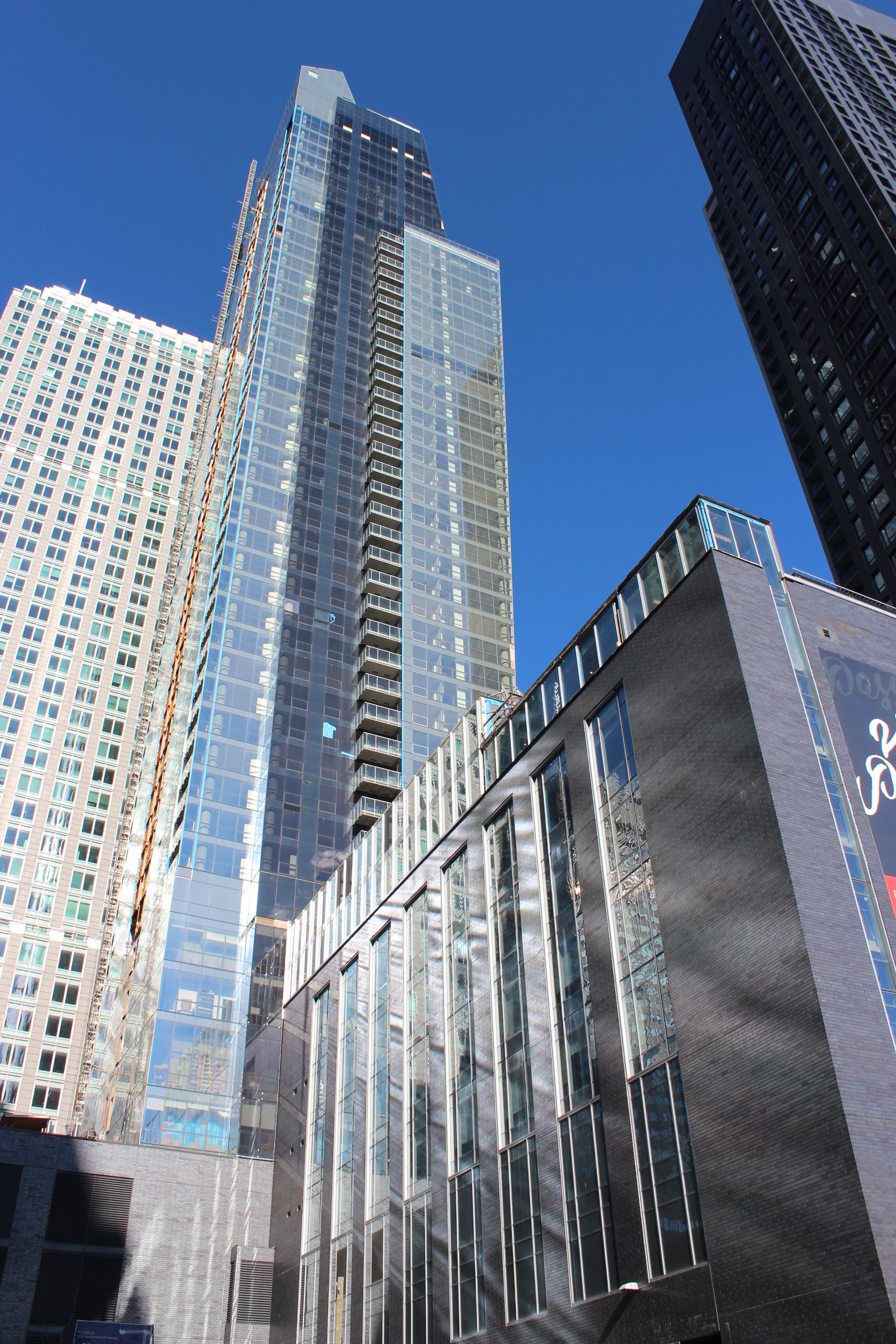

General information
- Status: Complete
- Type: Mixed
- Location: Montreal, Quebec, Canada
- Coordinates: 45.496594°N 73.571218°W
- Construction started: 2017
- Completed: 2020
- Cost: C$250 million

Height
- Height: 184 metres (604 ft)

Technical details
- Floor count: 50

Design and construction
- Architect: Page + Steele / IBI Group Architects

Website
- lavenuecondos.com

L'Avenue is a mixed-use skyscraper complex in Montreal, Quebec, Canada. It is located across from the Bell Centre in downtown Montreal, on Avenue des Canadiens-de-Montréal between de la Montagne Street and Drummond Street.

The tower has 350 condos, with a hotel and/or office space making up the lower floors. Excavation work began in December 2017, and was completed in 2020.

At 50 floors and 184 metres (or approximately 603 feet), it became the sixth tallest building in the city, and the tallest residential tower in Canada east of Toronto. Despite the same number of floors, the Tour des Canadiens across the street measures approximately 167 metres (or approximately 548 feet), placing it as the second tallest residential building and seventh tallest in the city overall. It is the tallest building erected in Montreal since 1992.

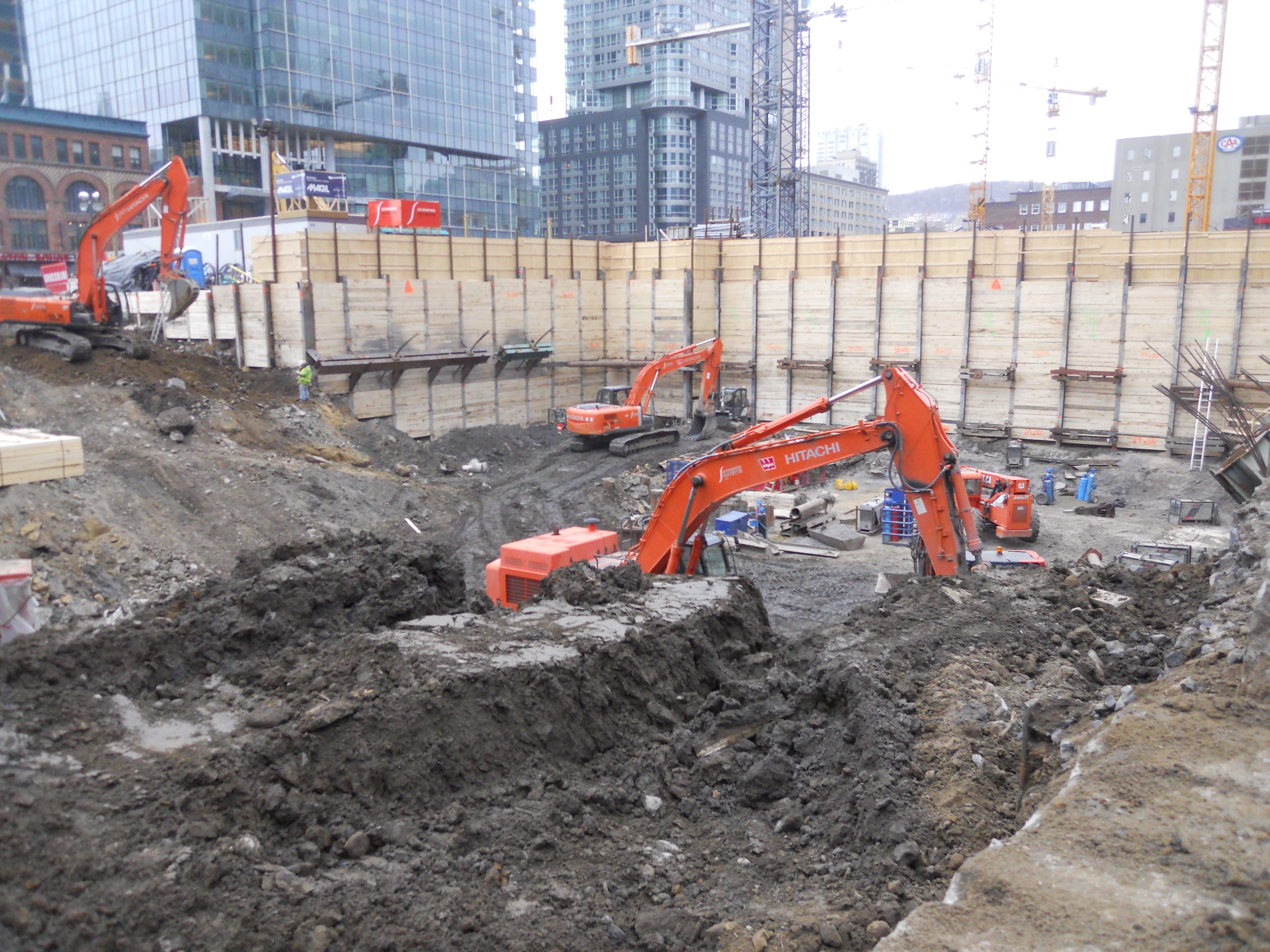
Construction site in March 2014

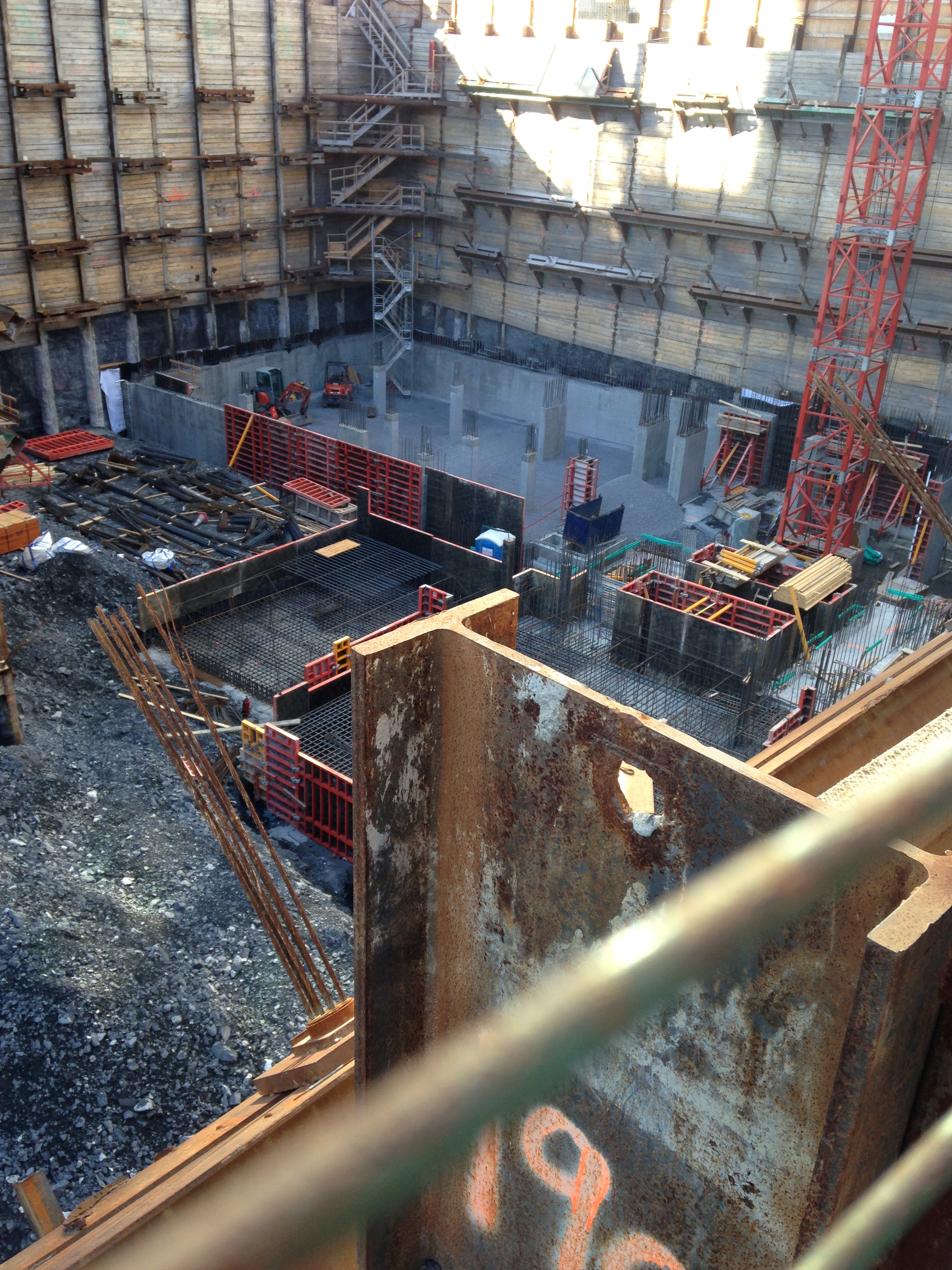
Construction site in September 2014

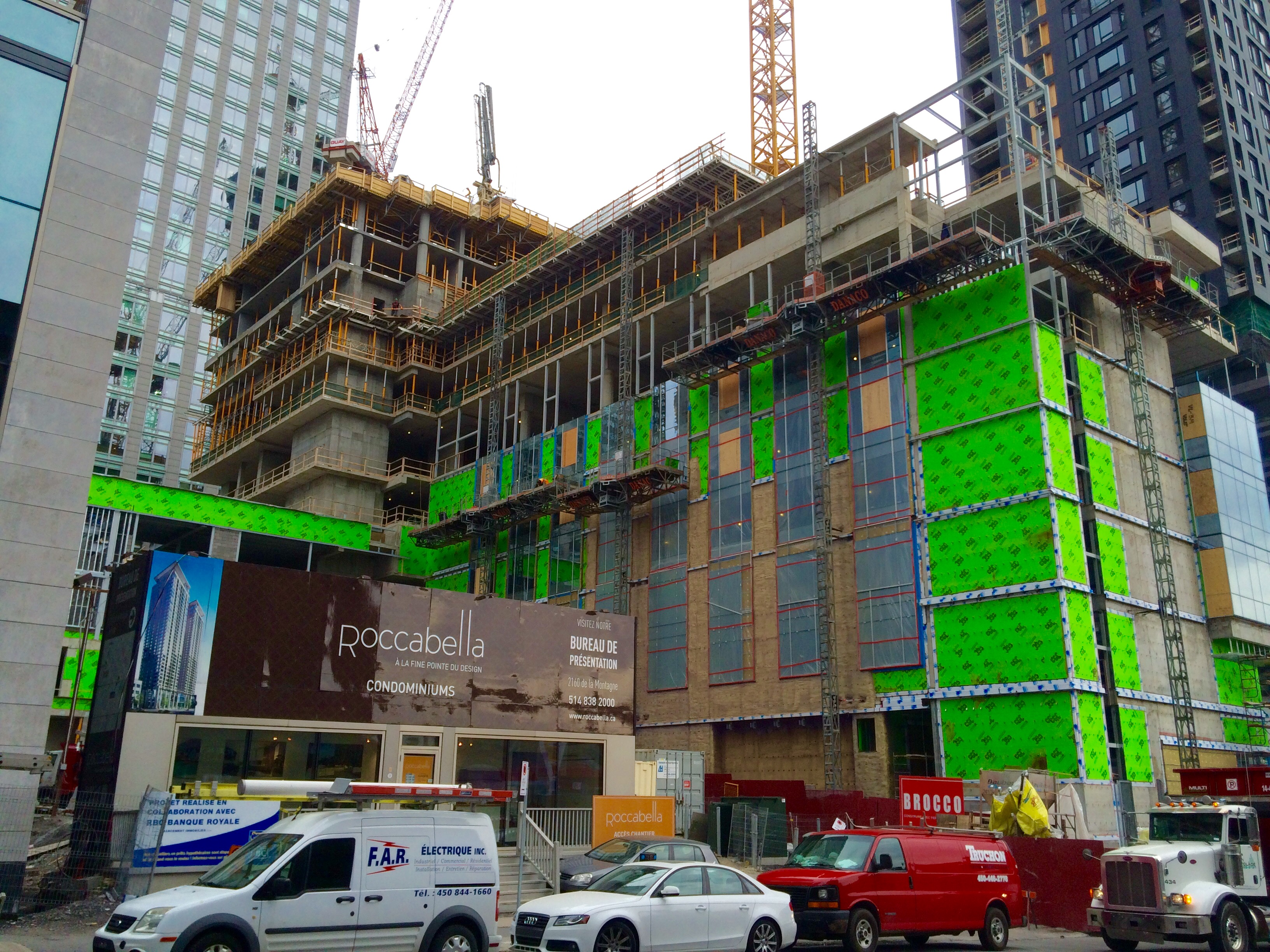
Construction site in September 2015

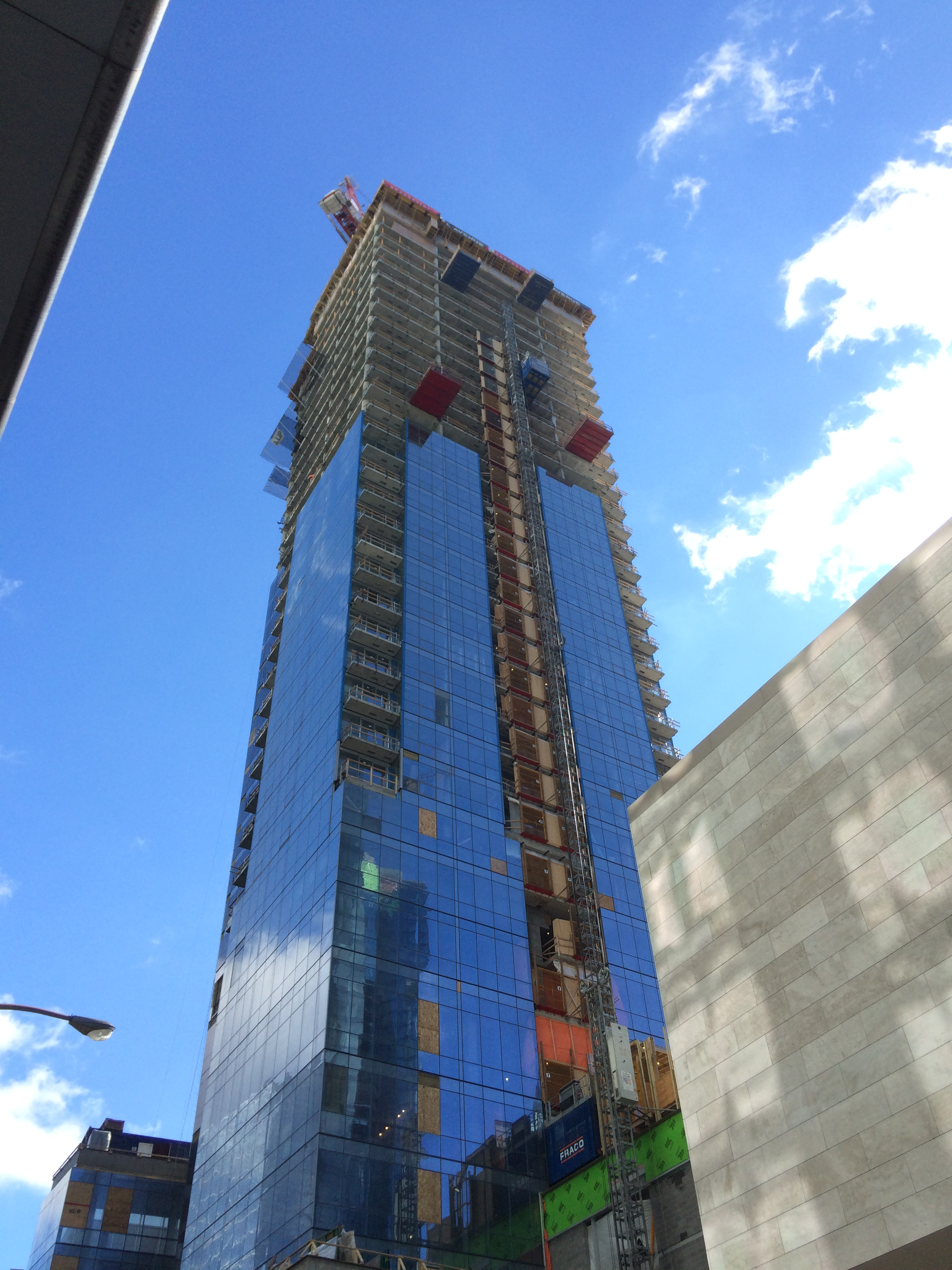
Construction site in March 2016
