= Aves (surname) =

Aves is a surname. Notable people with the surname include:

- Annie Aves (1887–1938), New Zealand abortionist
- Geraldine Aves (1898–1986), British civil servant and UN advisor
- Henry D. Aves (1853–1936), American Episcopal missionary
