= Dazzle Ships (album) =

Studio album by Orchestral Manoeuvres in the Dark
- Released: 4 March 1983
- Recorded: 1982
- Studios: Gramophone Suite (Liverpool); White House (Chertsey); Mayfair (London)
- Genres: Electronic; musique concrète; experimental; avant-pop
- Length: 34:43
- Label: Telegraph (Virgin)
- Producers: Rhett Davies; Orchestral Manoeuvres in the Dark

Orchestral Manoeuvres in the Dark chronology
Architecture & Morality (1981)	Dazzle Ships (1983)	Junk Culture (1984)

Singles from Dazzle Ships
- 1. "Genetic Engineering" Released: 11 February 1983; 2. "Telegraph" Released: 1 April 1983

Dazzle Ships is the fourth studio album by the English electronic band Orchestral Manoeuvres in the Dark (OMD), released on 4 March 1983 by Virgin Records (under the guise of the fictitious Telegraph label). Its title and cover art allude to a painting by Vorticist artist Edward Wadsworth based on dazzle camouflage, titled Dazzle-ships in Drydock at Liverpool.

The follow-up album to OMD's commercially successful Architecture & Morality (1981), Dazzle Ships marked a departure in sound for the group, who rebuffed record company pressure to duplicate their previous release. The album is noted for its experimental content, particularly musique concrète sound collages, and the use of shortwave radio recordings to explore Cold War and Eastern Bloc themes. It also concerns itself with the rise of technology in society. The record spawned two singles: "Genetic Engineering" and "Telegraph".

Dazzle Ships met with largely negative reviews and, despite reaching the top five of the UK Albums Chart, was regarded as a commercial flop. It nevertheless came to be recognised as a "cult classic", and an inspiration for many artists across electronic, rock and hip hop music. The music press gradually reversed its opinion of Dazzle Ships, praising the record as an underrated and misunderstood work, and an album ahead of its time.

== Background ==
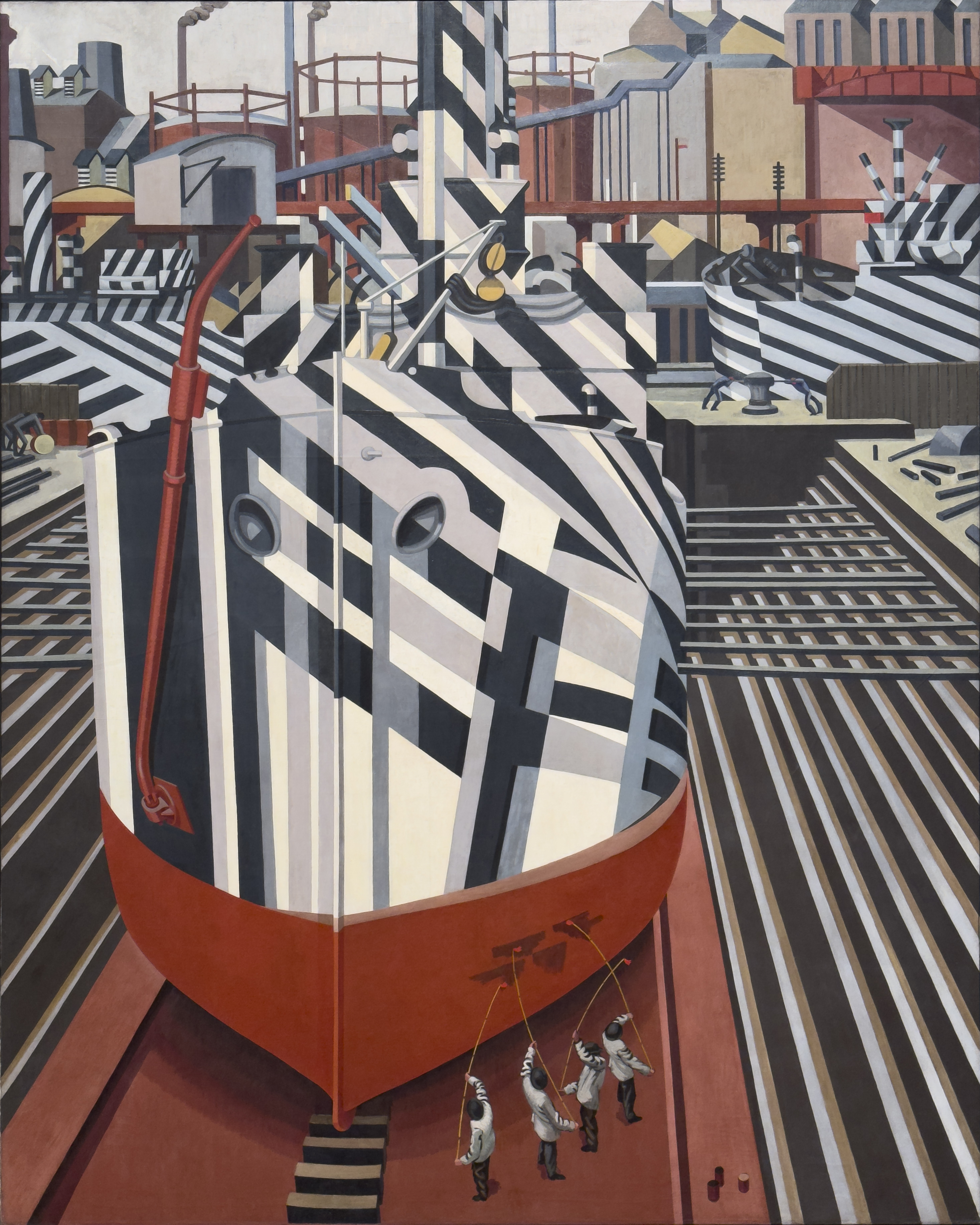
Dazzle-ships in Drydock at Liverpool (1919), the source of the album's name.

In the year following the release of commercially successful predecessor Architecture & Morality (1981), co-founder and keyboardist Paul Humphreys had married, and he and singer Andy McCluskey were growing apart. The pair had never expected the success they had achieved, and elected to retire OMD, having purchased their first cars and homes in Wirral. McCluskey said, "After two solid years of work... we had written our final epitaph – ["Maid of Orleans" B-side] "Of All the Things We've Made" – and didn't think we'd ever work together again. And all of a sudden, we were quite rich." However, Humphreys and McCluskey – who had delivered only three of their seven contracted albums for Dindisc – felt a debt to their fanbase, and began discussing new musical ideas.

Virgin Records, who had assumed OMD's contract following the collapse of independent subsidiary Dindisc, attempted to influence the sound of the album. Humphreys told how the label tried to sway the band towards duplicating Architecture & Morality, while assuring them they would become "the next Genesis"; this compelled the group to change musical direction. OMD were daunted by the pressure of matching the success of their previous release, and early sessions were not fruitful. Seeking refuge in their radio experiments of old, Humphreys and McCluskey came up with the sound collages "Dazzle Ships" and "Radio Prague". Paradoxically, in light of the eventual critical reaction to Dazzle Ships, the more experimental direction taken on the record was partly a response to muted reviews of Architecture & Morality, which "forced [OMD] into new areas".

At the band's Gramophone Suite studio in Liverpool, they reshuffled their inventory of instruments, introducing the E-mu Emulator. Pursuing musical inspiration, Humphreys and McCluskey moved to California for six weeks to live with the parents of Humphreys' wife. Upon returning to Liverpool, however, the pair had failed to produce any substantial ideas for the album. They elected to exhume "Of All the Things We've Made" for inclusion, feeling it had been squandered as a B-side, and resurrected "Radio Waves", a holdover from OMD precursor group the Id (this track was considered as a single). "The Romance of the Telescope (Unfinished)", which had appeared as a B-side to 1981's "Joan of Arc", was remixed and the "unfinished" caveat removed. Instrumentalists Martin Cooper and Malcolm Holmes grew dejected by the largely unproductive recording sessions, with Holmes stating, "This was the first time that OMD had reached a major stumbling block."

"At one Virgin meeting, the head of A&R asked us, 'Come on guys, are you [Karlheinz] Stockhausen or ABBA?' Andy and I said together, 'Can't we be both?'"

— Paul Humphreys

The band were encouraged by critics to become more political. As such, they used shortwave radio recordings to explore Cold War and Eastern Bloc themes, while oscillating between moody pop music and experimental, musique concrète soundscapes. "Radio Prague" features the interval signal of the Czechoslovak Radio foreign service, including the time signal and station identification spoken in Czech. "Time Zones" is a montage of various speaking clocks from around the world. Neither "Radio Prague" nor "Time Zones" carry a writing credit, with OMD being credited only for arranging the tracks. "This Is Helena", "ABC Auto-Industry" and "International" also include parts of broadcasts recorded off the air (a presenter introducing herself, an economic bulletin, and news, respectively). The record also explores the pros and cons of the rise of technology in society; "ABC Auto-Industry" attempts to recreate "the monotony of production line car manufacture".

For a time the group sought inspiration in a new studio, Phil Manzanera's White House (latter Gallery Studios) in Chertsey, and hired producer Rhett Davies. McCluskey said, "We intimidated [Davies] in the end. The songs were simply not up his street. They weren't conducive to being handled with slick touches and it ended up with arguments." This did little to help band morale, as Holmes explained, "Both myself and Martin seriously began to doubt Paul and Andy's judgement... More and more, it was becoming Andy's album." The sample-based approach to compiling the tracks further alienated Cooper and Holmes; the latter would ultimately play on only three songs, which had been recorded during the earlier Gramophone Suite sessions. Holmes spent his time at the White House "playing video games and trying to convince [him]self that Paul and Andy knew what they were doing." Part of the album was also recorded at Mayfair Studios in London. McCluskey has cited Kraftwerk's Radio-Activity (1975) as a key influence on the record.

To maintain the band's image of being signed to an indie label, Dazzle Ships purported to have been issued by the fictitious "Telegraph" label. It was released on LP, cassette tape and compact disc. The cover art was created by longtime OMD collaborator Peter Saville; Dazzle-ships in Drydock at Liverpool, the painting which inspired the album's title and artwork, is in the collection of the National Gallery of Canada in Ottawa.

== Commercial performance ==
Dazzle Ships peaked at number five on the UK Albums Chart (remaining in the top 20 for six weeks), and also reached the top-10 in New Zealand and Spain. The record achieved global sales of 300,000 copies; this figure represented a fraction of the sales of multi-million selling predecessor Architecture & Morality (1981). Dazzle Ships was therefore considered a failure. McCluskey recalled, "The painful joke at Virgin was that it shipped gold and returned platinum."

== Critical reception ==
Professional ratings
Review scores
Source	Rating
AllMusic	4/5 stars
CD Guide to Pop & Rock	4/5 stars
Pitchfork	8.4/10
PopMatters	8/10
Q	5/5 stars
Record Collector	5/5 stars
Record Mirror	2/5 stars
Smash Hits	8/10
Sounds	3/5 stars
Uncut	9/10

Initial reviews of Dazzle Ships were largely negative, with NME and other outlets making unfavourable comparisons to the work of OMD heroes Kraftwerk. A scathing Mark Moses in The Boston Phoenix rechristened the album "Guzzle Shit by Offensive Manure in the Park". Record Mirror's Jim Reid observed a "nightmarish" album "replete with the worst kind of futuristic nonsense", while John Gill of Time Out labelled it "redundant avant-garde trickery". Sun Times critic Michael Lawson dismissed the record's experimental content as filler, adding that "too much attention [is] given to soundtrack-like effects that only clutter what decent electropop baubles there are here." There were sporadic appeals for listener perseverance: Paul Colbert of Melody Maker portrayed the album as "a challenge and a reward", while Smash Hits reviewer Johnny Black argued that "the songs are waiting to be found and are as melodic, passionate and vital as ever."

Although a critical and commercial disappointment upon release, Dazzle Ships came to be seen as a noble failure. In The Rough Guide to Rock (1996), co-author Dave Castle said, "This austere evocation of modern alienation is the classic OMD album. Excellent use of samples and incredible synths on strong, melodic and above all highly intelligent pop music." During the 2000s it was endorsed by Mojo as a "buried treasure" and an "ignored masterwork", while Ned Raggett of AllMusic wrote that the "dazzling" record "beats Kraftwerk at their own game, science and the future turned into surprisingly warm, evocative songs." Westword labelled Dazzle Ships an "avant-pop opus". Trouser Press remained unconvinced, describing the album as "impressive but not satisfying". The magazine noted "some amazing sounds and a powerful atmosphere", but felt that "found-tape gimmickry" had taken precedence over songwriting.

Dazzle Ships met with critical praise upon its initial re-release in 2008. Tom Ewing of Pitchfork wrote, "Luckily, you don't need a contrarian streak to love it... history has done its own remix job on Dazzle Ships, and the result is a richer, more unified album than anyone in 1983 could have imagined." In a five-star review, Record Collector's Daryl Easlea referred to "consistently eccentric" and "dark and detailed" content, calling the album "a weirdly satisfying listen". Luke Turner of The Quietus said that it "stands the test of time as a heroic statement", and represents "a fine realisation of that desire to be both pop and important that OMD first hinted at with 'Enola Gay' and 'Electricity'." In a 2023 review, Martin Gray of Louder Than War observed "innovative synth pop that isn't afraid to break rules and invent new ones", adding that Dazzle Ships had "finally earned its belated and much-deserved due as a minor unsung masterpiece".

== Legacy ==
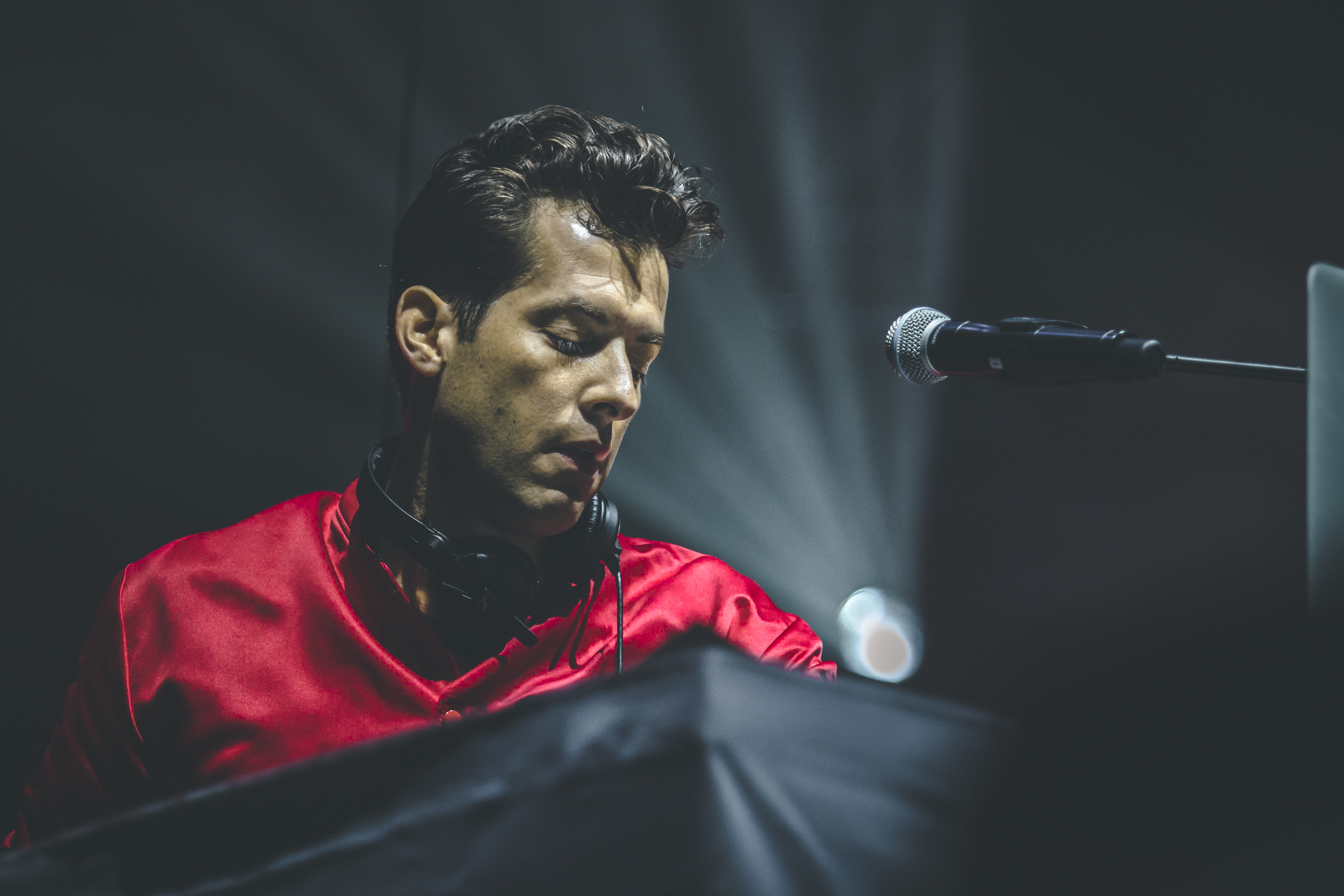
Dazzle Ships has been championed by many artists, including producer Mark Ronson.

Critics have acknowledged Dazzle Ships as an underrated and misunderstood work, and a record ahead of its time. John Bergstrom of PopMatters argued that while positive reappraisals of flop albums had become "all-too-common", the "prescient" Dazzle Ships lived up to the retrospective acclaim. Quietus writer Stuart Huggett charted the record's journey "from 1983 release to 2016 Classic Album", stating that it features some of OMD's strongest material but is "likely to remain too off the wall ever to permanently join the general public's Classic Albums canon". Dazzle Ships has nevertheless appeared in lists of 1983's best albums; The A.V. Club named it one of the year's "Great but Underappreciated Records". (Note: See:) It was included in that same publication's "Hall of Fame", as well as the Chicago Tribune's "10 Essential New Wave Albums", the 1980s edition of Uncut's "Ultimate Record Collection", and music journalist Paul Roland's "Ten Essential CDs" of the decade. The album maintained cult status in the years following its release, eventually coming to be regarded as a "cult classic".

Dazzle Ships has been cited as an influence by many recording artists, including the chart acts Arcade Fire, the Killers and Radiohead; comparisons have been drawn to Radiohead's experimental Kid A (2000). (Note: See:) Dazzle Ships informed much of Death Cab for Cutie's Codes and Keys (2011), and was described by the band's former guitarist, Chris Walla, as the record that "everyone points to as [OMD's] magnum opus". Walla added, "It's really a gorgeous album. It's daring and it's weird and it leans a lot on the paranoia of the Cold War." Saint Etienne and Future Islands identified Dazzle Ships as the template for their respective albums, Foxbase Alpha (1991) and In Evening Air (2010). Singer Anohni spoke of being "really changed" by the "scary, futuristic" record, while musician Telekinesis cited the "genius" album as his personal favourite and a major influence. Dazzle Ships also impacted the record producers Mark Ronson and Moby, the former saying, "I was just completely floored... It's just so elegant but a bit lo-fi at the same time."

The indie groups Another Sunny Day and Eggs released cover versions of "Genetic Engineering" (as 1989 and 1994 singles, respectively), with the latter's artwork being inspired by Dazzle Ships' inner sleeve; journalist Stuart Huggett saw both recordings as helpful to the album's "survival". Longtime Arcade Fire orchestrator, Owen Pallett, arranged an encore of songs from Dazzle Ships for a 2006 solo tour, and declared the album the best ever made. Pallett later said, "There have been certain records in my life that I feel have saved me. Saved my life... records that sound unique or try some new form of human expression. Records like Orchestral Manoeuvres in the Dark's Dazzle Ships." Singer-songwriter Anton Barbeau released a keyboard-based OMD homage titled "Slash Zed Zip" (an anagram of "Dazzle Ships") in 2022, and the band Haircut One Hundred namechecked the album in their song "A Wonderful Life" (2026). Rapper and producer Kid Cudi sampled "ABC Auto-Industry" on his track "Simple As..." (2009); hip-hop peer Lushlife released a 2012 reworking of "The Romance of the Telescope" (which employs a sample from the Dazzle Ships version). Martin Gray of Louder Than War saw the album as foreshadowing the widespread adoption of sampling, including the use of taped speeches and found sounds on subsequent mainstream releases.

Noah "Panda Bear" Lennox of Animal Collective stated that his band have listened to Dazzle Ships "on many tours". Liars frontman Angus Andrew and Low singer Alan Sparhawk each listed the record among their favourites, with Andrew describing it as "such a cohesive statement, portraying a bleak and lonely environment of a different sort." He added, "It's such an incredible feat to feature experiments like 'Dazzle Ships, Pts. 1-3' [sic], and have them... enhance an album with more straight forward tracks like 'Telegraph'." Bishop Allen vocalist Justin Rice named Dazzle Ships as a contender for the title of "greatest album ever". The record has received further endorsements from Shearwater frontman Jonathan Meiburg, Amanda "MNDR" Warner, Terre Thaemlitz, physicist/musician Brian Cox, and novelist/visual artist Douglas Coupland, who called it "amazing" and one of his 12 "must-have" albums. Quietus critic Ian Wade noted that Dazzle Ships has achieved significant popularity among dance artists.

== Band response ==
After the release of Dazzle Ships, OMD came to view the record as a creative mis-step. Humphreys lamented that "the good songs on it were lost in the overall presentation aspect." McCluskey assumed much of the responsibility, saying, "When the ideas man ran out of ideas, there was nothing left for the melody man [Humphreys] to work on." Band manager Gordian Troeller expressed regret over not insisting the album be re-recorded. He said, "I didn't fight, Virgin didn't either... I think some of the misgivings Paul felt about the work at the time were too easily overriden by Andy." The disappointing commercial performance of Dazzle Ships prompted OMD to move in a more conservative musical direction on subsequent releases.

By 1988, McCluskey and Humphreys had come to regard "The Romance of the Telescope" as their favourite of the group's songs. Upon Dazzle Ships' initial re-release in 2008, McCluskey noted its improved critical standing: "The album that almost completely killed our career seems to have become a work of dysfunctional genius... it's taken Paul [Humphreys] 25 years to forgive me for Dazzle Ships. But some people always hold it up as what we were all about, why they thought we were great." Humphreys later said, "When we re-released it a few years ago we got five-star reviews... so perhaps it was just a bit ahead of its time. I know fans still cite it as their favourite [OMD] record." Both men have since placed Dazzle Ships in the top three of the band's albums, along with Architecture & Morality (1981) and The Punishment of Luxury (2017).

== Track listing ==
- Label copy credits: All songs written and/or arranged by Orchestral Manoeuvres in the Dark (except "Radio Waves", by OMD/Floyd).
- Writing credits below from ASCAP database.

Side one
No.	Title	Writer(s)	Length
1.	"Radio Prague"	Arranged by Humphreys, McCluskey	1:18
2.	"Genetic Engineering"	Humphreys, McCluskey	3:37
3.	"ABC Auto-Industry"	Humphreys, McCluskey	2:06
4.	"Telegraph"	Humphreys, McCluskey	2:57
5.	"This Is Helena"	Humphreys, McCluskey	1:58
6.	"International"	McCluskey	4:25
Total length:			16:21

Side two
No.	Title	Writer(s)	Length
7.	"Dazzle Ships (Parts II, III & VII)"	Humphreys, McCluskey	2:21
8.	"The Romance of the Telescope"	Humphreys, McCluskey	3:27
9.	"Silent Running"	Humphreys, McCluskey	3:34
10.	"Radio Waves"	McCluskey, John Floyd	3:45
11.	"Time Zones"	Arranged by Humphreys, McCluskey	1:49
12.	"Of All the Things We've Made"	Humphreys, McCluskey	3:27
Total length:			18:23

Bonus tracks on 2008 reissue
No.	Title	Writer(s)	Length
13.	"Telegraph" (The Manor Version 1981)	Humphreys, McCluskey	3:25
14.	"4-Neu" ("Genetic Engineering" single b-side)	Humphreys, McCluskey	3:34
15.	"Genetic Engineering" (312MM version)	Humphreys, McCluskey	5:12
16.	"66 and Fading" ("Telegraph" single b-side)	Humphreys, McCluskey	6:33
17.	"Telegraph" (extended version)	Humphreys, McCluskey	5:38
18.	"Swiss Radio International"	None; "Arranged by OMD"	1:03
Total length:			25:25

The "Manor Version" of "Telegraph" was recorded at the same time as Architecture & Morality. "Swiss Radio International" was dropped from the album at the last minute. Like "Radio Prague", it contains the call sign for a radio station and was once referred to as "The Ice Cream Song" by drummer Malcolm Holmes due to its similarity to the melodies played by ice cream vans. Another version entitled "Radio Swiss International" appeared on the Unreleased Archive: Vol. 1 disc, included in the Souvenir, 40th anniversary box set issued in 2019. The disc also featured further demos entitled "Violin Piece" "SMPTE" and "Guitar Thrash", all dating back to the 1982/83 recording sessions.

A 40th anniversary release of Dazzle Ships, featuring further bonus demos and rarities, was announced on 2 February 2023, and released on 31 March. It was released on CD and on double 12" vinyl, as well as being made available on downloading and streaming platforms.

Bonus tracks on 2023 reissue
No.	Title	Writer(s)	Length
13.	"Telegraph 82" (Very Early Demo)	Humphreys, McCluskey	2:50
14.	"Silent Running" (Demo)	Humphreys, McCluskey	3:25
15.	"Sold Our Souls" (The Avenue Demo)	Humphreys, McCluskey	3:12
16.	"Shakespeare 82"	McCluskey	0:50
17.	"Untitled Instrumental 82"	Humphreys, McCluskey	3:22
18.	"In Heaven Above" (4-Neu Demo)	Humphreys, McCluskey	2:51
19.	"Telegraph" (Live 1984)	Humphreys, McCluskey	3:50

== Personnel ==
- Andy McCluskey – vocals, guitar, bass, keyboards, synthesizers
- Paul Humphreys – keyboards, synthesizers, vocals, percussion
- Martin Cooper – keyboards, synthesizers
- Malcolm Holmes – drums, percussion

== Production details ==
- Recorded at The Gramophone Suite, Gallery Studio and Mayfair Studio
- Mixed at The Manor Studio
- Engineered by Orchestral Manoeuvres in the Dark, Rhett Davies, Ian Little, Keith Richard Nixon, Brian Tench
- Produced by Orchestral Manoeuvres in the Dark and Rhett Davies
- Mastered at The Master Room by Arun Chakraverty
- Designed by M. Garrett, K. Kennedy, P. Pennington, Peter Saville, and Brett Wickens for Peter Saville Associates.

== Instruments ==
In terms of instrumentation, Dazzle Ships saw the band begin to explore digital sampling keyboards (the E-mu Emulator) in addition to their continued use of analogue synthesizers and the Mellotron.

List of used instruments:

- Roland Drumatix Rhythm Unit
- Eko Rhythmaker
- Korg MS-20
- Roland SH09
- Roland SH2
- E-mu Emulator I
- Novatron
- Sequential Circuits Prophet 5
- Oberheim OB-X
- Solina String Machine
- Vox Organ
- Toy Piano
- Rainbow Organ
- Piano
- Gretsch Drums
- Ludwig Drums
- Premier Military Bass Drum
- Hammer Bass Block Guitar
- Fender Jazz Bass
- Speak & Spell Machine
- Sanyo Short Wave Radio
- Typewriter

== Charts ==
=== Weekly charts ===
Weekly chart performance for Dazzle Ships
Chart (1983)	Peak position
Australian Albums (Kent Music Report)	100
Canada Top Albums/CDs (RPM)	25
Dutch Albums (Album Top 100)	19
German Albums (Offizielle Top 100)	11
New Zealand Albums (RMNZ)	10
Spanish Albums (AFYVE)	7
Swedish Albums (Sverigetopplistan)	38
UK Albums (Official Charts)	5
US Billboard 200	162

=== Year-end charts ===
Year-end chart performance for Dazzle Ships
Chart (1983)	Position
German Albums (Offizielle Top 100)	66

== Certifications ==
Certifications for Dazzle Ships
Region	Certification	Certified units/sales
United Kingdom (BPI)	Gold	100,000^{^}
^{^} Shipments figures based on certification alone.
