= Orchestral Manoeuvres in the Dark discography =

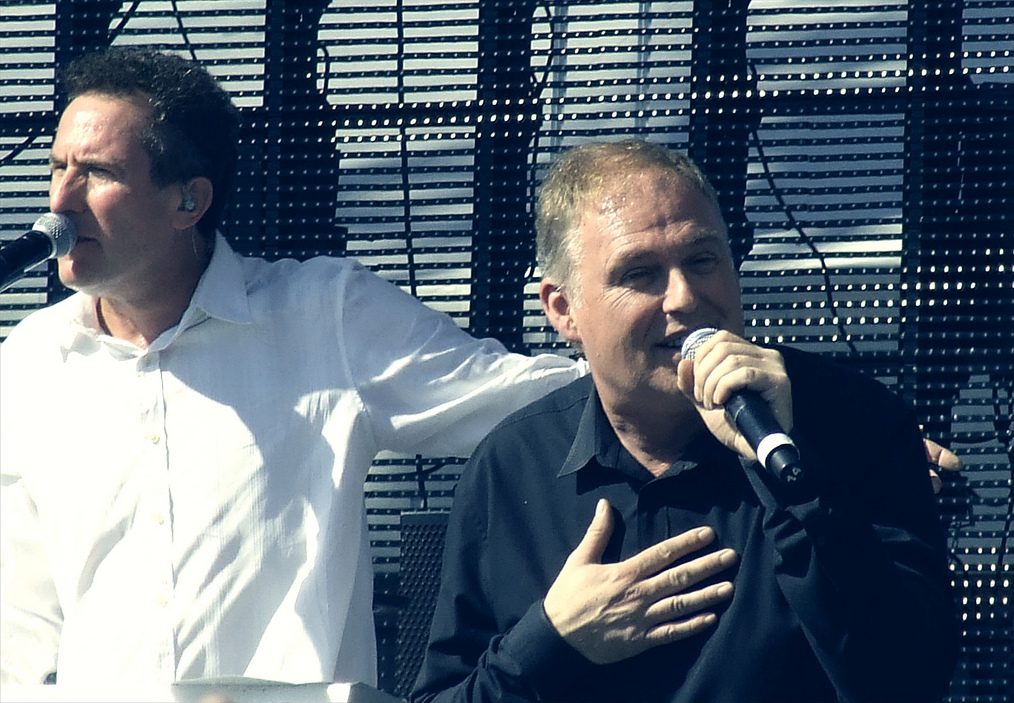
- Co-founders Andy McCluskey (left) and Paul Humphreys in 2011
- Studio albums: 14
- Extended plays: 5
- Live albums: 10
- Compilation albums: 9
- Singles: 46
- Video albums: 9
- Music videos: 49

The discography of the English electronic band Orchestral Manoeuvres in the Dark (OMD) includes 14 studio albums and 46 singles, among other releases. The group issued their debut single, "Electricity", in 1979, and achieved several international top 10 hits during the 1980s and 1990s, including their signature songs "Enola Gay" (1980) and "If You Leave" (1986). OMD's albums Architecture & Morality (1981), The Best of OMD (1988) and Sugar Tax (1991) were certified platinum or higher in the UK; the gold-certified Dazzle Ships (1983) became one of the band's more influential works.

OMD disbanded in 1996 but reformed in 2006, and have since re-established themselves as a top 10 presence on international album charts. The group's overall record sales stand in excess of 40 million, with sales of 15 million albums and 25 million singles as of 2019.

== Albums ==
=== Studio albums ===
Title	Album details	Peak chart positions										Certifications
Title	Album details	UK	AUS	CAN	GER	NL	NZ	SPA	SWE	SWI	US	Certifications
Orchestral Manoeuvres in the Dark	Released: 22 February 1980; Label: Dindisc; Formats: LP, MC	27	—	—	—	—	49	—	—	—	—	UK: Gold
Organisation	Released: 24 October 1980; Label: Dindisc; Formats: LP, MC	6	—	—	—	—	18	15	—	—	—	UK: Gold; FRA: Gold
Architecture & Morality	Released: 6 November 1981; Label: Dindisc; Formats: LP, MC	3	62	18	8	1	22	3	28	—	144	UK: Platinum; NL: Gold; SPA: Platinum
Dazzle Ships	Released: 4 March 1983; Label: Virgin; Formats: LP, MC	5	100	25	11	19	10	7	38	—	162	UK: Gold
Junk Culture	Released: 30 April 1984; Label: Virgin; Formats: CD, LP, MC	9	54	74	32	12	—	27	32	28	182	UK: Gold
Crush	Released: 17 June 1985; Label: Virgin; Formats: CD, LP, MC	13	—	36	23	15	23	—	38	—	38	UK: Silver; CAN: Gold
The Pacific Age	Released: 29 September 1986; Label: Virgin; Formats: CD, LP, MC	15	36	18	15	17	14	—	—	20	47	UK: Silver; CAN: Platinum
Sugar Tax	Released: 6 May 1991; Label: Virgin; Formats: CD, LP, MC	3	96	76	8	—	—	—	7	14	—	UK: Platinum; GER: Platinum; SWE: Gold
Liberator	Released: 14 June 1993; Label: Virgin; Formats: CD, LP, MC	14	—	—	17	59	—	—	20	32	169	
Universal	Released: 2 September 1996; Label: Virgin; Formats: CD, LP, MC	24	—	—	39	—	—	—	34	28	—	
History of Modern	Released: 20 September 2010; Label: 100%, Bright Antenna; Formats: CD, 2×LP, digital download	28	—	—	5	97	—	—	—	63	—	
English Electric	Released: 5 April 2013; Label: 100%/BMG; Formats: CD, LP, digital download	12	—	—	10	—	—	60	—	46	—	
The Punishment of Luxury	Released: 1 September 2017; Label: 100%/White Noise; Formats: CD, LP, MC, digital download	4	—	—	9	95	—	—	—	44	—	
Bauhaus Staircase	Released: 27 October 2023; Label: White Noise; Formats: CD, LP, MC, digital download	2	—	—	7	—	—	—	—	38	—	
"—" denotes releases that did not chart or were not released in that territory.

=== Live albums ===
Title	Album details
Peel Sessions 1979–1983	Released: 24 April 2000; Label: Virgin; Formats: CD, MC
OMD Live: Architecture & Morality & More	Released: 7 April 2008; Label: Eagle; Formats: CD
The History of Modern Tour – Live in Berlin	Released: 9 September 2011; Label: 100%/bluenoise; Formats: CD
Dazzle Ships at the Museum of Liverpool	Released: 25 September 2015; Label: White Noise; Formats: CD+DVD, digital download
Access All Areas	Released: 25 September 2015; Label: Edsel; Formats: CD+DVD, digital download
Architecture & Morality/Dazzle Ships – Live at the Royal Albert Hall	Released: 9 May 2016; Label: Live Here Now; Formats: 2×CD, 3×LP, digital download
Live with the Royal Liverpool Philharmonic Orchestra 06/10/18	Released: 6 October 2018; Label: Live Here Now; Formats: 2×CD, digital download
Live with the Royal Liverpool Philharmonic Orchestra 07/10/18	Released: 7 October 2018; Label: Live Here Now; Formats: 2×CD, digital download
Live at the Liverpool Empire	Released: 4 November 2019; Label: Live Here Now; Formats: 2×CD, digital download
Live at Eventim Hammersmith Apollo	Released: 20 November 2019; Label: Live Here Now; Formats: 2×CD, digital download

=== Compilation albums ===
Title	Album details	Peak chart positions									Certifications
Title	Album details	UK	AUS	CAN	GER	NL	NZ	SPA	SWI	US	Certifications
O.M.D.	Released: 3 August 1981; Label: Epic/Virgin/Dindisc; Formats: LP, MC; US-only release	—	—	—	—	—	—	—	—	—	
The Best of OMD	Released: 29 February 1988; Label: Virgin; Formats: CD, LP, MC	2	48	19	8	4	1	19	16	46	UK: 3× Platinum; CAN: Gold; GER: Gold; NL: Gold; NZ: Platinum; US: Gold
The OMD Singles	Released: 28 September 1998; Label: Virgin; Formats: CD, MC, MD	16	—	—	30	50	—	—	—	—	UK: Gold
Navigation: The OMD B-Sides	Released: 14 May 2001; Label: Virgin; Formats: CD	—	—	—	—	—	—	—	—	—	
Messages: Greatest Hits	Released: 29 September 2008; Label: EMI/Virgin; Formats: CD+DVD	—	—	—	—	—	—	—	—	—	
So80s (Soeighties) Present OMD – Curated by Blank & Jones	Released: 7 February 2011; Label: EMI/Soundcolours; Formats: CD	—	—	—	—	—	—	—	—	—	
The Punishment of Luxury: B Sides & Bonus Material	Released: 15 December 2017; Label: 100%/White Noise; Formats: CD, digital download	—	—	—	—	—	—	—	—	—	
Souvenir – The Singles 1979–2019	Released: 4 October 2019; Label: UMC/Virgin EMI; Formats: 2×CD, 5×CD+2×DVD, 3×LP, digital download	18	—	—	27	—	—	—	70	—	
Architecture & Morality – The Singles	Released: 15 October 2021; Label: UMC/EMI; Formats: CD, 3x12", digital download	45	—	—	39	—	—	—	—	—	
"—" denotes releases that did not chart or were not released in that territory.

== EPs ==
Title	EP details	Peak chart positions
Title	EP details	UK
The Unreleased '78 Tapes	Released: 24 October 1980; Label: Dindisc; Formats: 7"; Limited release with initial copies of Organisation	—
The OMD Remixes	Released: 14 September 1998; Label: Virgin; Formats: CDS, 12"	35
History of Modern (Part I)	Released: 2 September 2011; Label: 100%/bluenoise; Formats: CDS, 10", digital download	—
The Future Will Be Silent	Released: 20 April 2013; Label: 100%/BMG; Formats: 10"	—
Dazzle Ships at the Museum of Liverpool	Released: 11 December 2015; Label: PledgeMusic; Formats: 12"	—
"—" denotes releases that did not chart.

== Singles ==
=== 1970s–1980s ===
Title	Year	Peak chart positions										Certifications	Album
Title	Year	UK	AUS	BEL (FL)	GER	IRE	NL	NZ	SPA	US	US Dance	Certifications	Album
"Electricity" (released twice)	1979	—	—	—	—	—	—	—	—	—	—		Non-album single
"Red Frame/White Light"	1980	67	—	—	—	—	—	—	—	—	67 (Note: "Red Frame/White Light" and "Messages" jointly charted on the US Dance chart.)		Orchestral Manoeuvres in the Dark
"Electricity" (third release)	1980	99	—	—	—	—	—	—	—	—	—		Orchestral Manoeuvres in the Dark
"Messages"	1980	13	—	—	—	—	—	—	—	—	67		Orchestral Manoeuvres in the Dark
"Enola Gay"	1980	8	47	—	—	14	—	31	1	—	34	UK: Platinum; ITA: Gold	Organisation
"Souvenir"	1981	3	57	16	39	9	38	—	1	—	—	UK: Silver; SPA: Gold	Architecture & Morality
"Joan of Arc"	1981	5	—	—	—	13	—	—	—	—	—	UK: Silver	Architecture & Morality
"Maid of Orleans (The Waltz Joan of Arc)"	1982	4	78	1	1	5	1	7	1	—	—	UK: Silver; GER: Gold; NL: Gold; SPA: Gold	Architecture & Morality
"She's Leaving" (Benelux-only release)	1982	—	—	—	—	—	—	—	—	—	—		Architecture & Morality
"Genetic Engineering"	1983	20	—	18	20	11	—	—	6	—	—		Dazzle Ships
"Telegraph"	1983	42	—	—	39	28	—	—	—	—	—		Dazzle Ships
"Locomotion"	1984	5	30	4	14	4	8	32	—	—	61		Junk Culture
"Talking Loud and Clear"	1984	11	—	6	18	9	6	—	—	—	—		Junk Culture
"Tesla Girls"	1984	21	—	32	—	21	33	—	—	—	—		Junk Culture
"Never Turn Away"	1984	70	—	—	—	29	—	—	—	—	—		Junk Culture
"So in Love"	1985	27	56	4	18	13	12	—	—	26	16		Crush
"Secret"	1985	34	—	—	25	24	—	—	—	63	—		Crush
"La Femme Accident"	1985	42	—	17	—	—	49	—	—	—	—		Crush
"If You Leave"	1986	48	15	—	—	—	—	5	—	4	—	CAN: Gold	Pretty in Pink soundtrack
"(Forever) Live and Die"	1986	11	19	6	8	13	5	14	—	19	—		The Pacific Age
"We Love You"	1986	54	18	—	—	—	—	26	—	—	16		The Pacific Age
"Shame"	1987	52	—	27	—	—	—	—	—	—	—		The Pacific Age
"Dreaming"	1988	50	33	26	26	—	—	37	—	16	6		The Best of OMD
"Brides of Frankenstein" (US and Canada-only release)	1988	—	—	—	—	—	—	—	—	—	7		Non-album single
"—" denotes releases that did not chart or were not released in that territory.

=== 1990s–present ===
Title	Year	Peak chart positions										Album
Title	Year	UK	UK Indie	AUS	BEL (FL)	GER	IRE	NL	NZ	SWE	US Dance	Album
"Sailing on the Seven Seas"	1991	3	—	77	39	9	5	—	—	3	9	Sugar Tax
"Pandora's Box"	1991	7	—	53	19	11	19	—	—	7	11	Sugar Tax
"Then You Turn Away"	1991	50	—	—	—	56	—	—	—	—	—	Sugar Tax
"Call My Name"	1991	50	—	—	—	28	—	—	—	—	—	Sugar Tax
"Stand Above Me"	1993	21	—	—	29	33	—	—	39	28	6	Liberator
"Dream of Me (Based on Love's Theme)"	1993	24	—	—	—	53	—	22	—	—	—	Liberator
"Everyday"	1993	59	—	—	—	60	—	—	—	—	—	Liberator
"Walking on the Milky Way"	1996	17	—	—	—	53	—	—	—	49	—	Universal
"Universal"	1996	55	—	—	—	—	—	—	—	—	—	Universal
"If You Want It"	2010	176	21	—	—	49	—	—	—	—	—	History of Modern
"Sister Marie Says"	2010	169	15	—	—	—	—	—	—	—	—	History of Modern
"Metroland"	2013	—	44	—	—	—	—	—	—	—	—	English Electric
"Dresden"	2013	—	—	—	—	—	—	—	—	—	—	English Electric
"Night Café"	2013	—	—	—	—	—	—	—	—	—	—	English Electric
"Julia's Song"	2015	—	—	—	—	—	—	—	—	—	—	Junk Culture (deluxe edition)
"Isotype"	2017	—	—	—	—	—	—	—	—	—	—	The Punishment of Luxury
"The Punishment of Luxury"	2017	—	—	—	—	—	—	—	—	—	—	The Punishment of Luxury
"What Have We Done"	2017	—	—	—	—	—	—	—	—	—	—	The Punishment of Luxury
"One More Time"	2018	—	—	—	—	—	—	—	—	—	—	The Punishment of Luxury
"Don't Go"	2019	—	—	—	—	—	—	—	—	—	—	Souvenir – The Singles 1979–2019
"Electricity" (fourth release) (Note: This version of "Electricity" debuted on the UK Vinyl Singles Chart at No. 1, making it the highest "Electricity" has ever charted.)	2019	—	—	—	—	—	—	—	—	—	—	Non-album single
"Bauhaus Staircase"	2023	—	—	—	—	—	—	—	—	—	—	Bauhaus Staircase
"Slow Train"	2023	—	—	—	—	—	—	—	—	—	—	Bauhaus Staircase
"Kleptocracy"	2024	—	—	—	—	—	—	—	—	—	—	Bauhaus Staircase
"Look at You Now"	2024	—	—	—	—	—	—	—	—	—	—	Bauhaus Staircase
"—" denotes releases that did not chart or were not released in that territory.

== Videography ==
=== Video albums ===
Title	Album details	Additional information
Live at the Theatre Royal Drury Lane	Released: July 1982; Label: Virgin Video; Formats: VHS, Beta	Live concert. A DVD of this concert came with the 2007 reissue of Architecture & Morality.
Crush – The Movie	Released: June 1985; Label: Virgin Video; Formats: VHS, Beta, LD	Documentary on the band during the recording of Crush, with promo videos of the album's singles.
The Best of OMD	Released: March 1988; Label: Virgin Video; Formats: VHS	Promo videos
Souvenir	Released: 1 October 2007; Label: Aspect Television; Formats: DVD	Documentary on the history of the band, including the reformation in 2006/2007.
OMD Live: Architecture & Morality & More	Released: 28 April 2008; Label: Aspect Television; Formats: DVD	Live concert
Messages: Greatest Hits	Released: 29 September 2008; Label: EMI/Virgin; Formats: CD+DVD	Promo videos
Electricity: OMD with the Royal Liverpool Philharmonic Orchestra	Released: 14 December 2009; Label: FACT Films; Formats: 2xDVD	Live concerts
Architecture & Morality/Dazzle Ships – Live at the Royal Albert Hall	Released: 25 September 2015; Label: White Noise; Formats: CD+DVD, digital download	Live concert
Access All Areas	Released: 25 September 2015; Label: Edsel; Formats: CD+DVD, digital download	Live concert

=== Music videos ===
Title	Year	Director
"Electricity"	1979	Unknown
"Red Frame/White Light"	1980	Russell Mulcahy
"Messages"	1980	Russell Mulcahy
"Enola Gay" (version 1)	1980	Unknown
"Enola Gay" (version 2)	1980	Unknown
"Souvenir"	1981	Peter Saville
"Maid of Orleans (The Waltz Joan of Arc)"	1982	Steve Barron
"Genetic Engineering"	1983	Steve Barron
"Telegraph"	1983	Peter Sinclair
"Locomotion"	1984	Jean-Pierre Berckmans
"Talking Loud and Clear" (version 1)	1984	Simon Milne
"Talking Loud and Clear" (version 2)	1984	Unknown
"Tesla Girls"	1984	Simon Milne
"Never Turn Away"	1984	Simon Milne
"So in Love"	1985	Andy Morahan
"Secret"	1985	Andy Morahan
"La Femme Accident"	1985	Andy Morahan
"Hold You"	1985	Andy Morahan
"If You Leave"	1986	Ian Fletcher
"(Forever) Live and Die"	1986	Leslie Libman & Larry Williams
"We Love You"	1986	Unknown
"Shame" (version 1)	1987	Leslie Libman & Larry Williams
"Shame" (version 2)	1987	Unknown
"Dreaming"	1988	Unknown
"Sailing on the Seven Seas" (UK version)	1991	Martha Fiennes
"Sailing on the Seven Seas" (US version)	1991	Unknown
"Pandora's Box" (UK version)	1991	Andrew Doucette
"Pandora's Box (It's a Long, Long, Way)" (US version)	1991	Unknown
"Then You Turn Away"	1991	Unknown
"Call My Name"	1991	Andrew Doucette
"Stand Above Me" (Smoking version)	1993	Marcus Nispel
"Stand Above Me" (Non-smoking version)	1993	Marcus Nispel
"Dream of Me (Based on Love's Theme)"	1993	Pedro Romhanyi
"Everyday"	1993	Mr. Reindherr
"Walking on the Milky Way"	1996	Howard Greenhalgh
"Universal"	1996	Howard Greenhalgh
"Enola Gay" (Sash! remix)	1998	Unknown
"If You Want It"	2010	Lilah Vandenburgh
"Sister Marie Says"	2010	Lilah Vandenburgh
"History of Modern (Part 1)"	2010	Danilo Giannini, Bo Nordin, Björn Skallström
"Please Remain Seated"	2013	Henning M. Lederer
"Decimal"	2013	Henning M. Lederer
"Atomic Ranch"	2013	Henning M. Lederer
"Metroland"	2013	David O'Byrne
"Dresden"	2013	ROBisROB
"Night Café"	2013	Unknown
"Isotype"	2017	Henning M. Lederer
"The Punishment of Luxury"	2017	Luca Monterosso Wittmann
"What Have We Done"	2017	Unknown

=== Soundtracks ===
Song	Year	Soundtrack
"Enola Gay"	1981	Urgh! A Music War
"Enola Gay"	1983	Party Party
"Tesla Girls"	1985	Weird Science
"Sealand"	1985	Static
"If You Leave"	1986	Pretty in Pink
"We Love You"	1986	Playing for Keeps
"Secret"	1988	Arthur 2: On the Rocks
Film score (unreleased)	1991	For the Greater Good (TV)
"Locomotion"	1997	Thank God He Met Lizzie
"Enola Gay"	2008	Waltz with Bashir
"Enola Gay"	2009	1981
"Electricity"	2010	Worried About the Boy
"If You Leave"	2014	Back in the Day
"Secret"	2014	The Skeleton Twins
"So in Love"	2014	The Disappearance of Eleanor Rigby: Them
"If You Leave"	2014	Horrible Bosses 2
"Enola Gay"	2014	Ex Machina
"So in Love"	2015	The D Train
"Souvenir"	2015	Mistress America
"Thrill Me"	2015	Eddie the Eagle
"Enola Gay"	2017	Rock'n Roll
"Electricity", "Enola Gay"	2021	Happily
