= OMD Live: Architecture & Morality & More =

Live album by Orchestral Manoeuvres in the Dark
- Released: 7 April 2008
- Recorded: 19 May 2007; Hammersmith Apollo, London
- Genre: Synth-pop
- Length: 67:30
- Label: Eagle

Orchestral Manoeuvres in the Dark chronology
Navigation: The OMD B-Sides (2001)	OMD Live: Architecture & Morality & More (2008)	Messages: Greatest Hits (2008)

Alternative cover
- DVD cover

OMD Live: Architecture & Morality & More is a live album and DVD by Orchestral Manoeuvres in the Dark, based on the group's third studio album, Architecture & Morality (1981). It was recorded at the Hammersmith Apollo, London on Saturday 19 May 2007.

Clash noted in its review of the album, "It goes without saying that [Andy] McCluskey's pissed dad dancing fails to impress, but his strong vocals show that OMD are otherwise as good as ever."

== Track listing ==
=== CD ===
==== UK release ====
Release date: 7 April 2008

1. "Architecture & Morality"
2. "Sealand"
3. "The New Stone Age"
4. "Georgia"
5. "She's Leaving"
6. "Souvenir"
7. "Joan of Arc"
8. "Joan of Arc (Maid of Orleans)"
9. "The Beginning and the End"
10. "If You Leave"
11. "(Forever) Live and Die"
12. "Pandora's Box"
13. "Locomotion"
14. "Sailing on the Seven Seas"
15. "Enola Gay"
16. "Electricity"
17. "The Romance of the Telescope"

==== US release ====
Release date: 8 April 2008

1. "Architecture & Morality"
2. "Sealand"
3. "The New Stone Age"
4. "Georgia"
5. "She's Leaving"
6. "Souvenir"
7. "Joan of Arc"
8. "Joan of Arc (Maid of Orleans)"
9. "The Beginning and the End"
10. "If You Leave"
11. "(Forever) Live and Die"
12. "Enola Gay"
13. "Electricity"

=== DVD ===
Release dates: 28 April 2008 (UK) and 3 June 2008 (US)

1. "Architecture & Morality"
2. "Sealand"
3. "The New Stone Age"
4. "Georgia"
5. "She's Leaving"
6. "Souvenir"
7. "Joan of Arc"
8. "Joan of Arc (Maid of Orleans)"
9. "The Beginning and the End"
10. "Messages"
11. "Tesla Girls"
12. "(Forever) Live and Die"
13. "If You Leave"
14. "Pandora's Box"
15. "Talking Loud & Clear"
16. "So in Love"
17. "Locomotion"
18. "Sailing on the Seven Seas"
19. "Enola Gay"
20. "Walking on the Milky Way"
21. "Electricity"
22. "The Romance of the Telescope"
