= Messages: Greatest Hits =

Compilation album by Orchestral Manoeuvres in the Dark
- Released: 29 September 2008
- Recorded: 1979–1996
- Genre: Synth-pop
- Length: 130:00 (Approx.)
- Label: EMI
- Producers: OMD; Mike Howlett; Richard Manwaring; Rhett Davies; Brian Tench; Stephen Hague; Tom Lord-Alge

Orchestral Manoeuvres in the Dark chronology
OMD Live: Architecture & Morality & More (2008)	Messages: Greatest Hits (2008)	History of Modern (2010)

Messages: Greatest Hits (sometimes listed as Messages: OMD Greatest Hits) is a compilation release by Orchestral Manoeuvres in the Dark (OMD), issued in 2008. At the time it was the most comprehensive of the band's retrospective packages, featuring a CD of 20 charting singles and a DVD of all the band's music videos. Material was drawn from the group's recording career from 1979 to their first disbandment in 1996.

It is the first time that all of the band's music videos have been released on DVD. "Joan of Arc" had no video filmed at the time, so a mimed performance on the UK music show Top of the Pops has been added to the DVD instead. "Hold You" was considered as the second single from Crush and a promo video was made, but the single was never released.

== Reception ==
Professional ratings
Review scores
Source	Rating
AllMusic	4.5/5 stars
Record Collector	4/5 stars

Messages: Greatest Hits received favourable reviews. In his review for The Quietus, John Doran wrote: "OMD are the only Liverpool band to come near to living up to the monolithic standards of productivity and creativity set in place by the Beatles...this compilation is a reminder that Orchestral Manouevres in the Dark are not one of the best synth bands ever: they are one of the best bands ever." Doran did, however, voice a mild criticism that the CD component leans too heavily toward the group's later, more pop-oriented work, and specifically lamented the omission of 1980 single "Red Frame/White Light" (although its accompanying music video features on the DVD).

AllMusic awarded the compilation 4.5 stars out of a possible 5. Ian Peel in Record Collector gave it 4 out of 5, and said: "Between them Andy McCluskey and Paul Humphreys are responsible for creating two brilliant, but very different, bands. Orchestral Manoeuvres in the Dark, the early 80's Factory descendents who sampled blast furnaces and the Stanlow oil refinery; and OMD, the late 80's stadium pop act... The main reason to buy this one is the bonus DVD."

== Track listing ==
=== Disc one: CD ===
1. "Messages" – 4:44
2. "Electricity" – 3:31
3. "Enola Gay" – 3:32
4. "Souvenir" – 3:37
5. "Joan of Arc" – 3:48
6. "Maid of Orleans" – 4:12
7. "Genetic Engineering" – 3:37
8. "Telegraph" – 2:56
9. "Locomotion" – 3:57
10. "Talking Loud and Clear" – 3:56
11. "Tesla Girls" – 3:35
12. "So in Love" – 3:30
13. "Secret" – 3:57
14. "If You Leave" – 4:30
15. "(Forever) Live and Die" – 3:36
16. "Dreaming" – 3:58
17. "Sailing on the Seven Seas" – 3:45
18. "Pandora's Box" – 4:06
19. "Dream of Me" – 3:53
20. "Walking on the Milky Way" – 4:02

=== Disc two: DVD ===
1. "Electricity"
2. "Red Frame/White Light"
3. "Messages"
4. "Enola Gay"
5. "Souvenir"
6. "Joan of Arc" (from Top of the Pops)
7. "Maid of Orleans"
8. "Genetic Engineering"
9. "Telegraph"
10. "Locomotion"
11. "Talking Loud and Clear"
12. "Tesla Girls"
13. "Never Turn Away"
14. "So in Love"
15. "Secret"
16. "La Femme Accident"
17. "Hold You"
18. "If You Leave"
19. "(Forever) Live and Die"
20. "We Love You"
21. "Shame"
22. "Dreaming"
23. "Sailing on the Seven Seas"
24. "Pandora's Box"
25. "Then You Turn Away"
26. "Call My Name"
27. "Stand Above Me"
28. "Dream of Me"
29. "Everyday"
30. "Walking on the Milky Way"
31. "Universal"
