= The Best of OMD =

Compilation album by Orchestral Manoeuvres in the Dark
- Released: 29 February 1988
- Recorded: 1979–1988
- Genre: Synth-pop
- Length: 53:54 (LP and Cassette); 73:41 (CD, MiniDisc, and DCC)
- Label: Virgin
- Producers: OMD; Mike Howlett; Richard Manwaring; Rhett Davies; Brian Tench; Stephen Hague; Tom Lord Alge

Orchestral Manoeuvres in the Dark chronology
| The Pacific Age (1986) | The Best of OMD (1988) | Sugar Tax (1991) |

Singles from The Best of OMD
- 1. "Dreaming" Released: 25 January 1988

The Best of OMD is a compilation album by the English electronic band Orchestral Manoeuvres in the Dark (OMD), released by Virgin Records on 29 February 1988; marking a decade since the band's beginnings. The record essentially delineates the group's experimental early years from their pop-oriented later work: side one features recordings from 1979 to 1984, while side two is drawn from the group's 1984–1988 efforts.

The album was a worldwide success, becoming a Top 5 hit across Europe and achieving 3× platinum sales in the United Kingdom and gold status in the United States. "Dreaming" was released as a single and made little impact on the UK charts, reaching No. 50, but it was a hit in the US (No. 16), Germany (No. 26) and South Africa (No. 2).

The Best of OMD was named by The Quietus and Classic Pop as one of the best compilation albums in history.

== Background ==
The version of "Electricity" used is the same as the one featured on their debut album (which itself is the band reworking Martin Hannett's original Factory version). The band was originally going to use their very first version of this song, but found the drumming to be inferior and so settled for the remix of the track instead. "Messages" is the more popular 10" single version; "Tesla Girls" is a compilation version not previously released; and "Talking Loud and Clear" is the 7" edited version.

The worldwide CD, MiniDisc and DCC versions of the album are resequenced and feature four extra tracks not present on the LP version: "Telegraph" (a unique mix found only on this release, differing from the album version and both 12" versions), "Genetic Engineering", and 12" versions of "La Femme Accident" and "We Love You". The US CD adds only the latter two 12" versions. The Australian version of the vinyl album replaces "Secret" with "We Love You", since that song had been a popular hit there. There was also a video compilation released with the promo videos of some of the songs featured on the album.

The Best of OMD was the group's final album release of the decade, effectively closing a chapter on their history as co-founder Paul Humphreys left the following year. According to the band, they had no interest in releasing a hits compilation and did so in order to pay off seemingly inexplicable debts owed to Virgin Records.

== Reception ==
Professional ratings
Review scores
| Source | Rating |
|---|---|
| AllMusic | 4.5/5 stars |
| Encyclopedia of Eighties Music | 4/5 stars |
| Great Rock Discography | 8/10 |
| MusicHound | 4/5 stars |
| Number One | 4/5 stars |
| Tom Hull – on the Web | A− |
| The Village Voice | B+ |

Max Bell of Number One wrote, "Every song seems to be a classic in its own right... [The Best of OMD] is a timely reminder of just how good pop music can be." Robert K. Oermann noted, "For years, OMD has been pumping out a steady stream of shimmering, shiny dance-pop singles, custom-made for those late nights spent bobbing and weaving to hypnotic rhythms. This [album] contains 14 perfect OMD sonic ripples." Detroit Free Press critic Gary Graff referred to the compilation as a "stellar collection of singles". In mid-1988, The Observer reported that The Best of OMD was the ninth best-selling CD album in Britain for the first half of the year.

In a retrospective review, Mike DeGagne of AllMusic highlighted the band's knack for strong hooks, and described The Best of OMD as an "excellent compilation" from a group who "were responsible for some of the catchiest and brightest synth pop that the '80s had to offer". Trouser Press called the record "a concise recapitulation of the band's artistic development", while Quietus writer Ian Wade dubbed it "one of the greatest singles collections ever". It was ranked 13th in Classic Pop's "Top 20 Compilation Albums".

== Track listing ==
All songs written by OMD, except "Locomotion" written by OMD and Gordian Troeller, and "So in Love" written by OMD and Stephen Hague.

=== Vinyl LP and Music Cassette ===
Side one
| No. | Title | Writer(s) | Album | Length |
|---|---|---|---|---|
| 1. | "Electricity" | Humphreys, McCluskey | Orchestral Manoeuvres in the Dark | 3:30 |
| 2. | "Messages" | Humphreys, McCluskey | Orchestral Manoeuvres in the Dark | 4:44 |
| 3. | "Enola Gay" | McCluskey | Organisation | 3:31 |
| 4. | "Souvenir" | Humphreys, Cooper | Architecture & Morality | 3:34 |
| 5. | "Joan of Arc" | McCluskey | Architecture & Morality | 3:47 |
| 6. | "Maid of Orleans" | McCluskey | Architecture & Morality | 4:09 |
| 7. | "Talking Loud and Clear" | Humphreys, McCluskey, Cooper | Junk Culture | 3:53 |
| Total length: | | | | 27:08 |

Side two
| No. | Title | Writer(s) | Album | Length |
|---|---|---|---|---|
| 1. | "Tesla Girls" | Humphreys, McCluskey | Junk Culture | 3:33 |
| 2. | "Locomotion" | Humphreys, McCluskey, Gordian Troeller | Junk Culture | 3:53 |
| 3. | "So in Love" | Humphreys, McCluskey, Stephen Hague | Crush | 3:28 |
| 4. | "Secret" | Humphreys, McCluskey | Crush | 3:56 |
| 5. | "If You Leave" | Humphreys, McCluskey, Cooper | Pretty in Pink | 4:28 |
| 6. | "(Forever) Live and Die" | Humphreys, Weir, Weir | The Pacific Age | 3:34 |
| 7. | "Dreaming" | Humphreys, McCluskey | Previously unreleased | 3:54 |
| Total length: | | | | 26:46 (53:54) |

=== Compact Disc, MiniDisc and Digital Compact Cassette ===
| No. | Title | Writer(s) | Album | Length |
|---|---|---|---|---|
| 1. | "Electricity" | Humphreys, McCluskey | Orchestral Manoeuvres in the Dark | 3:30 |
| 2. | "Messages" | Humphreys, McCluskey | Orchestral Manoeuvres in the Dark | 4:44 |
| 3. | "Enola Gay" | McCluskey | Organisation | 3:31 |
| 4. | "Souvenir" | Humphreys, Cooper | Architecture & Morality | 3:34 |
| 5. | "Joan of Arc" | McCluskey | Architecture & Morality | 3:47 |
| 6. | "Maid of Orleans" | McCluskey | Architecture & Morality | 4:09 |
| 7. | "Telegraph" | Humphreys, McCluskey | Dazzle Ships | 3:43 |
| 8. | "Tesla Girls" | Humphreys, McCluskey | Junk Culture | 3:33 |
| 9. | "Locomotion" | Humphreys, McCluskey, Troeller | Junk Culture | 3:53 |
| 10. | "Talking Loud and Clear" | Humphreys, McCluskey, Cooper | Junk Culture | 3:53 |
| 11. | "So in Love" | Humphreys, McCluskey, Hague | Crush | 3:28 |
| 12. | "Secret" | Humphreys, McCluskey | Crush | 3:56 |
| 13. | "If You Leave" | Humphreys, McCluskey, Cooper | Pretty in Pink | 4:28 |
| 14. | "(Forever) Live and Die" | Humphreys, Weir, Weir | The Pacific Age | 3:34 |
| 15. | "Dreaming" | Humphreys, McCluskey | Previously unreleased | 3:54 |
| 16. | "Genetic Engineering" | Humphreys, McCluskey | Dazzle Ships | 3:35 |
| 17. | "We Love You" (12" Version) | Humphreys, McCluskey, Hague | The Pacific Age | 6:14 |
| 18. | "La Femme Accident" (12" Version) | Humphreys, McCluskey | Crush | 6:16 |
| Total length: | | | | 73:41 |

=== VHS Video ===
| No. | Title | Length |
|---|---|---|
| 1. | "Electricity" |
| 2. | "Messages" |
| 3. | "Enola Gay" |
| 4. | "Souvenir" |
| 5. | "Maid of Orleans" |
| 6. | "Talking Loud and Clear" |
| 7. | "Tesla Girls" |
| 8. | "Locomotion" |
| 9. | "So in Love" |
| 10. | "Secret" |
| 11. | "If You Leave" |
| 12. | "(Forever) Live and Die" |
| 13. | "Dreaming" |
| 14. | "Telegraph" |
| 15. | "We Love You" |
| 16. | "La Femme Accident" |

== Charts ==
=== Weekly charts ===
Weekly chart performance for The Best of OMD
| Chart (1988) | Peak position |
|---|---|
| Australian Albums (ARIA) | 48 |
| Canada Top Albums/CDs (RPM) | 19 |
| Dutch Albums (Album Top 100) | 4 |
| European Albums (Music & Media) | 4 |
| German Albums (Offizielle Top 100) | 8 |
| New Zealand Albums (RMNZ) | 1 |
| Spanish Albums (AFYVE) | 19 |
| Swiss Albums (Schweizer Hitparade) | 16 |
| UK Albums (Official Charts) | 2 |
| US Billboard 200 | 46 |

=== Year-end charts ===
Year-end chart performance for The Best of OMD
| Chart (1988) | Position |
|---|---|
| Canada Top Albums/CDs (RPM) | 54 |
| Dutch Albums (Album Top 100) | 50 |
| European Albums (Music & Media) | 37 |
| German Albums (Offizielle Top 100) | 54 |
| UK Albums (Gallup) | 26 |

== Certifications ==
Certifications for The Best of OMD
| Region | Certification | Certified units/sales |
|---|---|---|
| Canada (Music Canada) | Gold | 50,000^{^} |
| Germany (BVMI) | Gold | 250,000^{^} |
| Netherlands (NVPI) | Gold | 50,000^{^} |
| New Zealand (RMNZ) | Platinum | 15,000^{^} |
| United Kingdom (BPI) | 3× Platinum | 900,000^{^} |
| United States (RIAA) | Gold | 500,000^{^} |
^{^} Shipments figures based on certification alone.

== Release history ==
| Country | Date | Format | Label | Cat.no. |
|---|---|---|---|---|
| UK | 1988 | LP | Virgin | OMD1 |
| UK | 1988 | Musicassette | Virgin | TCOMD1 |
| UK | 1988 | Compact Disc | Virgin | CD OMD |
| UK | 1988 | VHS | Virgin | VVD247 |
| UK | 1992 | DCC | Virgin | 458604 |
| UK | 1998 | MiniDisc | Virgin | MD OMD1 |

== Credits ==
- "Electricity" and "Dreaming" are produced by OMD.
- "Messages", "Enola Gay" and "Souvenir" are produced by OMD and Mike Howlett.
- "Joan of Arc" and "Maid of Orleans" are produced by OMD and Richard Manwaring.
- "Telegraph" and "Genetic Engineering" are produced by OMD and Rhett Davies.
- "Tesla Girls", "Locomotion" and "Talking Loud and Clear" are produced by OMD and Brian Tench.
- "So in Love", "Secret", "(Forever) Live and Die", "We Love You" and "La Femme Accident" are produced by Stephen Hague.
- "If You Leave" is produced by OMD and Tom Lord Alge.
