= La Femme Accident =

Single by Orchestral Manoeuvres in the Dark

from the album Crush
- B-side: "Firegun"
- Released: 14 October 1985
- Recorded: 1984
- Studio: The Manor (Shipton-on-Cherwell, England)
- Length: 2:50
- Label: Virgin
- Songwriters: Andy McCluskey; Paul Humphreys
- Producers: Stephen Hague; Orchestral Manoeuvres in the Dark

Orchestral Manoeuvres in the Dark singles chronology
"Secret" (1985)	"La Femme Accident" (1985)	"If You Leave" (1986)

Music video
- "La Femme Accident" on YouTube

"La Femme Accident" is a song by the English electronic band Orchestral Manoeuvres in the Dark (OMD), released as the third and final single from their sixth studio album Crush (1985). Like two of their previous singles, it references Joan of Arc. Unlike those two singles, it was not a substantial hit, peaking at No. 42 on the UK singles chart.

== Release history ==
The single was released in both 7-inch and 12-inch formats. Although the 7-inch single version does not differ in any way from the album version, the 12-inch version is a radically different remix. The 12-inch release features both versions as well as the new track "Firegun". Initial releases of the 12-inch came with a bonus 12-inch disc in a gatefold sleeve featuring a live recording of their 1984 hit "Locomotion" and the 1980 hit single "Enola Gay". The 12-inch version of "La Femme Accident" was released as a bonus track on the band's first compilation album The Best of OMD (1988). The 7-inch version was excluded from this release and subsequent OMD compilation albums until its inclusion on the definitive Souvenir singles compilation, released in 2019 to mark the band's 40th anniversary.

"La Femme Accident" was not released as a standalone single in the US and Canada but coupled with the successful North American single "If You Leave". The Canadian 12-inch release of "If You Leave" (1985) also features the 12-inch mix of "La Femme Accident" although it is an edit of the UK 12-inch with a timing of 5:38.

"La Femme Accident" features as the B-side of some US versions of the "If You Leave" single. Some issues state a running time of 3:56, whereas the record actually features the standard 2:50 7-inch version. Other issues state a duration of 2:42 but record actually plays the 5:39 version.

A music video was made for the song and is included on the CD and DVD compilation Messages: Greatest Hits (2008). The video features the two main band members Paul Humphreys and Andy McCluskey with Humphreys in the role of a professional photographer in difficulty with a blonde model (the "femme accident") with whom he also seems to be in a relationship. McCluskey on the other hand is in the role of a sharp-suited businessman who, singing the song straight into camera in close-up, manages to convince a board of members that the model is good material and towards the end of the video is taken away by McCluskey in a chauffeur driven car leaving a forlorn Humphreys behind.

The single's B-side "Firegun" is available on the OMD B-side compilation album Navigation: The OMD B-Sides (2001).

== Critical reception ==
Anna Martin of Number One described "La Femme Accident" as "splendid" and "possibly the best single to have been lifted from the pristine Crush." In Smash Hits, Vici MacDonald observed a "pleasant, wistful, plinkety-plunk ballad". Both journalists noted a similarity to the 1963 easy listening song "Can't Get Used to Losing You" as recorded by the American singer Andy Williams.

== Live performances ==
"La Femme Accident" was included in the setlist of the band's live performances in 1985 promoting the Crush studio album. The band also appeared on the BBC television music series The Old Grey Whistle Test in 1985 (then known as Whistle Test) to perform the song live.

"La Femme Accident" has been included in the setlist of each of the concerts OMD have performed live with the Royal Liverpool Philharmonic Orchestra (RLPO), in both 2009 and 2018. The first of these concerts was on 20 June 2009 and a recording is available on the DVD release, Electricity: OMD with the Royal Liverpool Philharmonic Orchestra. "La Femme Accident" was also included in the setlist when OMD performed with the RLPO for a second time over consecutive nights on 6 and 7 October 2018, as part of a series of special events by the band to commemorate their 40th anniversary. Recordings were made across both nights and feature on the CD, vinyl and digital release Live with the Royal Liverpool Philharmonic Orchestra.

== Track listing ==
7-inch: Virgin / VS 811 (UK/Europe)

1. "La Femme Accident" – 2:50
2. "Firegun"

Some 7-inch releases printed and manufactured in Germany have side A as the mirrored image of the original side B cover whereas side B is the mirrored image of the original side A cover. The text is on the correct sides and not mirrored. Although the time on the label states 3:43 the singles play the 2:48 album version of "La Femme Accident".

12-inch: Virgin / VSD 811-12 (UK)

1. "La Femme Accident" (7-inch version) – 2:50
2. "Firegun"
3. "La Femme Accident" (12-inch version) – 6:15
4. "Locomotion" (live)
5. "Enola Gay"

== Chart positions ==
Chart (1985)	Peak position
UK singles chart	42
