= Messages (Orchestral Manoeuvres in the Dark song) =

- Sleeve of the UK 7-inch single

Single by Orchestral Manoeuvres in the Dark

from the album Orchestral Manoeuvres in the Dark
- B-side: "Taking Sides Again"; "Waiting for the Man"
- Released: 2 May 1980
- Recorded: Advision, London
- Genre: Synth-pop; new wave
- Length: 3:59 (7" version); 4:06 (album version); 4:41 (10" version)
- Label: Dindisc
- Songwriters: Paul Humphreys; Andy McCluskey
- Producer: Mike Howlett

Orchestral Manoeuvres in the Dark singles chronology
"Red Frame/White Light" (1980)	"Messages" (1980)	"Enola Gay" (1980)

Music video
- "Orchestral Manoeuvres In The Dark - Messages" on YouTube

"Messages" is a song by the English electronic band Orchestral Manoeuvres in the Dark (OMD) from their self-titled debut studio album (1980). A re-recorded version of the song was released on 2 May 1980 as the album's third and final single, reaching number 13 on the UK Singles Chart and becoming OMD's first top-40 entry. As with their debut single "Electricity", "Messages" features a melodic synth break instead of a sung chorus.

== Background ==
Most copies of the original 10-inch pressing with the album version were scrapped on behalf of the band (because they wanted to rerecord the song), but a handful did escape destruction. Some of these were given away as part of a competition for the OMD fan club in 1980. These pressings can be distinguished only by the shorter track time and different runout information.

The later grey two-tone labels incorrectly state the producer as Chester Valentino. Mike Howlett is the producer, as the track was remixed and times at 4:48 – later editions again feature grey labels correctly attributed to Howlett and were also issued with different coloured record labels including red, green and a pink/white combination. These labels also correctly credit Howlett for the production.

== Reception ==
In Smash Hits, Esmé Sprigg wrote that "Messages" displays OMD's "gentle touch and masterly restraint to maximum advantage. Interlocking melodic ideas, plaintive vocal, generally haunting stuff. While all the competition are slapping posterpaint everywhere, [OMD] work with watercolours." Sprigg also had praise for the single's cover artwork. Boston Rock stated, "They think they're so slick, don't they? OMD came up with another winner in 'Messages'. It's snappy, electro-disco beat music with cool vocals." In 1981, Sunie Fletcher of Record Mirror noted the song as a "mini-classic".

AllMusic's Ned Raggett later wrote that the track "wears the emotion of its lyrics on its sleeve, with a killer opening line – 'It worries me, this kind of thing, how you hope to live alone and occupy your waking hours' – and a melody both propulsive and fragile". Critic Dave Thompson called the song "haunting" and "sublime", with a "gorgeous melody [that] is swallowed in sorrow". In a 2020 article, Ian Canty of Louder Than War described "Messages" as "peerless", adding, "It's a real cliché now to say something still sounds like the future 40 years on, but here it is valid enough. This record was a key electronic music track... a cutting study of human emotion struggling to be expressed in a new, clean and hyper-modern world."

== Legacy ==
"Messages" has been named as one of 1980's best singles. Classic Pop placed the song at no. 5 in both the "Top 20 Liverpudlian Singles of the 80s", and OMD's "Top 25 Tracks". In the latter piece, the magazine observed "one hell of a [synthesizer] melody", and lauded the lyric, "memories are uncertain friends". "Messages" was voted by Electronic Sound readers as the 18th-greatest electronic song in history, and was included in BBC Radio 6 Music's "500 Extraordinary Tracks That Tell the Story of Alternative Music".

Ricky Wilde, brother and collaborator of Kim Wilde, cited the "gorgeous" song – in particular its ostinato synthesizer riff – as a major influence during the composition of Kim's 1981 hit "Kids in America". Scott Simon of Our Daughter's Wedding likened the opening riff of his band's "Lawnchairs" to that of "Messages", calling it "something of an homage". Singer-songwriter Jane Weaver cited the "amazing" track as being important to her musical development. "Messages" has been covered by artists including White Town and Frost, and musician/producer Lowfish used the line "memories are uncertain friends" as the title of his 2010 studio album. The song was featured in the second series of crime drama Ashes to Ashes (2009).

In a 1994 instalment of Melody Maker's "Rebellious Jukebox" interview series, synth-pop artist Gary Numan selected "Messages" as one of the 12 tracks with special personal significance to him. Appearing on BBC Radio 4 in 2011, physicist/musician Brian Cox named the record as one of eight that he would take if he were to be cast away on a desert island. Author and former Die Krupps bassist, Rudi Esch, described "Messages" as "amazing" and his "personal favourite" from OMD, adding that it is "surely the UK's answer to [Kraftwerk's] 'Antenna'."

== Song versions and B-sides ==
An early version of "Messages" was recorded on 20 August 1979 and broadcast by John Peel on his Radio 1 programme on 3 September. Although the song structure and lyrics remained the same, the song originally had a slower tempo than either the single or album versions, the latter being the first to be officially released on the band's debut album in February 1980.

The song was re-recorded for the release as a single in May 1980 and this new version differs from the album version. The single was produced by Mike Howlett who would go on to produce the band's highly successful follow up single "Enola Gay" and their second album Organisation later in the year. The 7" version is slightly shorter than the 10" with an earlier fade out. The 10" version is featured on the compilation albums The Best of OMD (1988), The OMD Singles (1998) and Messages: Greatest Hits (2008), which takes its title from this song and also includes the music video. The 10" version was also added as a bonus track on the remastered Orchestral Manoeuvres in the Dark album, released in 2003.

An instrumental dub version of "Messages", titled "Taking Sides Again" is featured as the B-side on both the 7" and 10" singles. On the 10" single, a cover version of The Velvet Underground's song "I'm Waiting for the Man" was included, retitled "Waiting for the Man". Both B-sides can be found as bonus tracks on the remastered Orchestral Manoeuvres in the Dark; only "Waiting for the Man" was included on the Navigation: The OMD B-Sides compilation album, released in 2001.

== Sleeve design ==
There are different sleeves for the 7" and 10". Both were designed by Peter Saville and Brett Wickens. The photography was done by Trevor Key and depicts a ballpoint pen by Parafernalia.

== TV promotion and chart performance ==
The band performed the song live for a showcase appearance on the BBC music programme The Old Grey Whistle Test in May 1980. The performance was later featured in the Synth Britannia at the BBC programme following the Synth Britannia documentary first broadcast in October 2009. The group also made their Top of the Pops debut on 8 May 1980 when the single was at just no. 53 in the UK Singles Chart. Sheffield electronic music band The Human League also made their Top of the Pops debut on the same show. Although "Messages" made slow progress in the charts, the band made a second performance on the programme on 29 May when it was at no. 26 for the second week running. The single eventually made it to no. 13 but was not featured on Top of the Pops again due to the UK Musicians Union strike.

== Live performances ==
The song has been regularly performed live by the band during concerts since 1979. Official audio releases can be found on Live at Leigh Rock Festival 1979 (released 2006), Access All Areas (1980 performance, CD/DVD released 2015), "Universal" CD single (1993 performance, released 1996), Dazzle Ships at The Museum of Liverpool (2014 performance, CD/DVD released 2015) and Architecture & Morality / Dazzle Ships – Live at the Royal Albert Hall (2016).

Video releases of live performances of "Messages" can be found on the DVDs OMD Live: Architecture & Morality & More (2007) and Electricity: OMD with the Royal Liverpool Philharmonic Orchestra (2009) as well as on the Access All Areas and Dazzle Ships at The Museum of Liverpool DVDs.

The band performed their version of "Waiting For the Man" during live shows in 1979 and 1980, and later performed a radical reworking of the song featuring brass instruments on their Junk Culture tour in 1984. A recording of the latter version at the Hammersmith Odeon in London features on the 12" version of the "Never Turn Away" 12" single release in 1984.

== Track listing ==
=== UK 7-inch single (DIN15) ===
Side one
No.	Title	Writer(s)	Length
1.	"Messages" (7″ version)	Paul Humphreys; Andy McCluskey	3:59

Side two
No.	Title	Writer(s)	Length
1.	"Taking Sides Again"	Humphreys; McCluskey	4:19

=== UK 10-inch single (DIN15/10) ===
Side one
No.	Title	Writer(s)	Length
1.	"Messages" (10″ version)	Humphreys; McCluskey	4:41

Side two
No.	Title	Writer(s)	Length
1.	"Waiting for the Man"	Lou Reed	2:54
2.	"Taking Sides Again"	Humphreys; McCluskey	4:19

== Charts ==
Chart (1980)	Peak position
UK Singles (Official Charts)	13
US Dance Club Songs (Billboard) with "Red Frame/White Light"	67
