= Secret (Orchestral Manoeuvres in the Dark song) =

Single by Orchestral Manoeuvres in the Dark

from the album Crush
- B-side: "Drift" (UK); "Firegun" (US)
- Released: 8 July 1985
- Recorded: 1984
- Studio: The Manor (Shipton-on-Cherwell, England)
- Genre: New wave
- Length: 3:56
- Label: Virgin (UK); A&M (US)
- Songwriters: Andy McCluskey; Paul Humphreys
- Producers: Stephen Hague; Orchestral Manoeuvres in the Dark

Orchestral Manoeuvres in the Dark singles chronology
"So in Love" (1985)	"Secret" (1985)	"La Femme Accident" (1985)

Music video
- "Secret" on YouTube

"Secret" is a 1985 song by the English electronic band Orchestral Manoeuvres in the Dark (OMD), released as the second single from their sixth studio album Crush. Paul Humphreys sings lead vocals on the track. It became their second US Billboard Hot 100 entry, peaking at number 63, and also made number 34 on the UK singles chart.

The song was featured in the American romantic comedy film Arthur 2: On the Rocks (1988) and on its soundtrack album; it was also re-released to radio in the US as the follow-up to The Best of OMD track "Dreaming", approximately one month prior to the film's premiere. Though it received renewed airplay on several US contemporary hit stations, it did not re-chart on the Hot 100.

== Critical reception ==
Writing in Number One, Stuart Husband referred to "Secret" as a "pretty song" and "the Manoeuvres' cutest single for many a moon". Stateside, the Gavin Report dubbed it "the strongest OMD track since the tragically overlooked 'Souvenir'." Bill Merrill of the Altus Times noted the song's "smooth combination of airy vocals and catchy hooks", while Cashbox called it a "strong" and "very melodic" track with a "gently pulsing synth beat".

In a retrospective review, Dave Thompson of AllMusic observed an "emotive love song buried in an over-produced behemoth of a backing". Conversely, Thompson's colleague Mike DeGagne lauded the track as one of OMD's best 1980s singles, noting its "adolescent innocence". Rolling Stone's Paul Evans described "Secret", and previous release "So in Love", as "flawless singles".

Meric Long of the Dodos named "Secret" his favourite track of all time: "I'd have to characterize that as the song that I've listened to the most in my life and never gotten sick of... No matter what mood I'm in I can always jive with it." Barenaked Ladies instrumentalist Kevin Hearn recalled being "in love with the song" and recording a cover version with his high school band. Live 105 ranked "Secret" the 69th-best track in history, while CFNY-FM placed it 351st.

== B-sides ==
The UK B-side "Drift" was an instrumental song written by Paul Humphreys and Martin Cooper. The US B-Side "Firegun" is a vocal song credited to the whole band that was later released on their fourth compilation album Navigation: The OMD B-Sides (2001). "Firegun" was released in the UK as the B-side to the band's successive single "La Femme Accident".

== Music video ==
The video for "Secret", directed by Andy Morahan, shows various vintage black and white film clips, including footage of the Beatles, interspersed with new black and white footage of Humphreys and a woman processed to look like old home movies; additionally there are colour scenes of Humphreys singing. The theme is that a woman deserts her current love interest (McCluskey) to return to the arms of her true love (Humphreys). McCluskey's character observes the two lovers together and, though despondent, gallantly accepts that his love interest should instead be with Humphreys' character, before walking into the distance along the shore. The clip was filmed at the seaside town of Walton-on-the-Naze, Essex.

== Live performances ==
The song was part of the setlist during the Crush tour in 1985 and 1986, although more recently it has largely been performed at gigs in the US. A video recording of a short concert held in Rotterdam, the Netherlands in aid of Greenpeace on 26 October 1985 shows that Humphreys shared the lead vocal with Andy McCluskey.

== Personnel ==
Credits sourced from "One Two Testing"

- Paul Humphreys – lead and backing vocals, E-mu Emulator, Fairlight CMI
- Andy McCluskey – backing vocals, Fairlight CMI
- Martin Cooper – Roland Jupiter-8, Fairlight CMI
- Malcolm Holmes – drums

Additional Personnel

- Maureen Humphreys – sampled "secret" vocal

== Track listing ==
7": Virgin / VS 796 (UK)

1. "Secret" – 3:54
2. "Drift" – 4:14

12": Virgin / VS 796-12 (UK)

1. "Secret" (extended mix) – 6:14
2. "Drift" – 4:14

12": Virgin / SA 3028 (France Promo)

1. "Secret" (Version Remix) – 6:04
2. "Secret" – 3:57

7" A&M/Virgin / AM-2794 (US)

1. "Secret" – 3:54
2. "Firegun" – 4:36

Initial releases had a bonus disc with:

1. "Red Frame/White Light"
2. "I Betray My Friends"

== Charts ==
Chart (1985–1986)	Peak position
Ireland (IRMA)	24
UK Singles (Official Charts)	34
US Billboard Hot 100	63
US Adult Contemporary (Billboard)	37
US Cash Box Top 100	71
West Germany (GfK)	25

== Cover versions ==
A cover of the song by Laura Watling appeared on the compilation album Pretending to See the Future: A Tribute to OMD (2001).

== References in other media ==
The hit Canadian teen drama Degrassi: The Next Generation, which was known for naming episodes in its early seasons after '80s hit songs, named a two-part episode after this song. It was also featured in the American comedy drama film The Skeleton Twins (2014).
