= If You Leave (song) =

1986 single by Orchestral Manoeuvres in the Dark

Single by Orchestral Manoeuvres in the Dark

from the album Pretty in Pink soundtrack
- B-side: "88 Seconds in Greensboro"; "La Femme Accident"
- Released: 21 April 1986
- Genre: New wave
- Length: 4:25
- Label: Virgin
- Songwriters: Andy McCluskey; Paul Humphreys; Martin Cooper
- Producers: Orchestral Manoeuvres in the Dark; Tom Lord-Alge

Orchestral Manoeuvres in the Dark singles chronology
"La Femme Accident" (1985)	"If You Leave" (1986)	"(Forever) Live and Die" (1986)

Music video
- "If You Leave" on YouTube

"If You Leave" is a song by the English electronic band Orchestral Manoeuvres in the Dark (OMD). It was recorded for the soundtrack to the film Pretty in Pink (1986), in which it is played prominently during the final scene. Along with 1980's "Enola Gay", the track has been described as OMD's signature song.

"If You Leave" is the group's highest-charting single on the US Billboard Hot 100, where it reached number four in May 1986. The song was also a top-five hit in Canada and New Zealand and charted at number 15 in Australia. A defining track of the 1980s, it was described by Interview as "one of the most influential, zeitgeist-capturing songs ever to be written".

== Composition ==
The end of the film Pretty in Pink, set in a high school prom, was originally meant to feature the OMD song "Goddess of Love" (which the band released on The Pacific Age later in 1986.) However, director John Hughes decided to change the ending to Pretty in Pink after poor test audience reactions, and felt that the new ending required a song with different lyrical content. Hughes asked OMD for a new song to match the feel of the ending, and also specified that it should be written at a tempo of 120 BPM, to match the speed of "Don't You (Forget About Me)", which the actors in the scene had danced to during filming. This request came two days before OMD were due to begin a tour, and as a result "If You Leave" was written and recorded in under 24 hours.

Lyrically the band has stated that the song is about "The end of high school... the ending of your childhood", elaborating that they were trying to capture "this fear of what comes next". Singer Andy McCluskey later noted that an editing error meant the dancing appears out of sync despite the matched tempo.

== Critical reception and legacy ==
"If You Leave" has garnered both praise and derision since its release. Ian Cranna in Smash Hits wrote that the song is "false and contrived and seems to last about 3 years" (but described UK B-side "88 Seconds in Greensboro" as "OMD at their blazing best"). On the other hand, Billboard's Brian Chin dubbed it a "magical beat/ballad" and a "key cut" from the Pretty in Pink soundtrack. "If You Leave" was popular among WLIR listeners, who voted it "Screamer of the Week". Retrospectively, Alfred Soto of The Village Voice said the track "starts promisingly" and features "admirably straightforward" lyrics, but concluded: "Gradually the annoyances become menaces. The parts are garish, overstated; it's a cluttered mix." Trouser Press called the song a "dull ballad" that "was thankfully omitted from OMD's subsequent album, The Pacific Age".

Conversely, Stereogum critic Ryan Leas considered the track to be among "the best songs of the '80s", and described its intro/chorus synthesizer melody as "one of the best sounds ever". Andrew Unterberger in Stylus Magazine said that the "gorgeous" song makes the final scene of Pretty in Pink "one of the best in cinematic history". AllMusic journalist Mike DeGagne named "If You Leave" as the best track from Pretty in Pink, adding that "its adult feel and smooth transition from stanza to chorus makes it [OMD's] most memorable song". Critics have argued that the track was "snubbed" at the 59th Academy Awards in the Best Original Song category. Country singer Blake Shelton noted that he and wife Gwen Stefani (of rock band No Doubt) "both love the song" and considered it for the first dance at their wedding. Electronic artist Bogdan Raczynski cited "If You Leave" as an influence in a 2019 interview, stating, "This track stopped me dead in my tracks. Was it the synth? The melody? The unique blend of a voice that was clearly masculine yet somehow soft? I don't know, but it really caught me off guard. To this day, a single second of this track transports me." McCluskey reported that Matt Healy of pop rock band the 1975, who recorded at McCluskey's Liverpool studio, personally conveyed his deep affection for "If You Leave".

Hugo Lindgren in The New York Times Magazine suggested that the stateside popularity of "If You Leave" and the similarly pop-oriented Crush (1985), "obscured OMD's legacy as musical innovators" from US audiences, and marked a shift toward "making music for whoever signed the checks". Listeners in OMD's native UK – where the band had gained an audience with edgy, experimental music – were particularly resistant to the track, which peaked at no. 48 on the UK Singles Chart. McCluskey commented: "It's a blessing to have such a big hit, but a shame that it overshadows so many other good songs for the US audience. We have many European fans who hate the song." Along with 1980's "Enola Gay", "If You Leave" has been described as OMD's signature song.

In 2016, Entertainment Weekly journalist Dana Falcone described "If You Leave" as a "now-classic tune" and "OMD's best-known song to Americans". Kevin Wuench of the Tampa Bay Times dubbed the track "a signature song of the '80s that will never leave the radio", while Interview called it "one of the most influential, zeitgeist-capturing songs ever to be written". The track has been included in various "greatest songs" listings; (Note: See:) KOOL-FM named it the third-best new wave song of the 1980s, while Time Out ranked it the 10th greatest track of 1980s cinema. KROQ positioned "If You Leave" as the 16th-best song of 1986; in a Slicing Up Eyeballs reader poll, it was voted the fifth-greatest song of the year.

== Track listings ==
7-inch: Virgin / VS 843 (UK)

1. "If You Leave" – 4:30
2. "88 Seconds in Greensboro" – 4:20

7-inch re-issue: A&M/Virgin / AM 8669 (US)

1. "If You Leave" – 4:24
2. "Secret" – 3:57

7-inch: A&M/Virgin / AM 2811 (US)

1. "If You Leave" - 4:24
2. "La Femme Accident" - 3:58

12-inch: Virgin / VS 843-12 (UK)

1. "If You Leave" (extended version) – 5:59
2. "88 Seconds in Greensboro" – 4:20
3. "Locomotion" (live version) – 3:50

12-inch: A&M/Virgin / SP-12176 (US)

1. "If You Leave" (extended version) – 5:59
2. "La Femme Accident" (extended version) – 5:36

== Personnel ==
Personnel are sourced from "Making Music" magazine, the "Vintage Synth" forum and the original album liner notes.

Orchestral Manoeuvres in the Dark

- Andy McCluskey – lead and backing vocals, Fairlight CMI
- Paul Humphreys – E-mu Emulator II, Yamaha DX7, Roland Jupiter-8, Fairlight CMI, backing vocals
- Martin Cooper – Fairlight CMI, saxophone

== Charts ==
=== Weekly charts ===
Chart (1986)	Peak position
Australia (Kent Music Report)	15
Canada Top Singles (RPM)	5
New Zealand (Recorded Music NZ)	5
South Africa (Springbok Radio)	25
UK Singles (Official Charts)	48
US Billboard Hot 100	4
US 12-inch Singles Sales (Billboard)	31
US Adult Contemporary (Billboard)	24
US Cash Box Top 100	8

=== Year-end charts ===
Chart (1986)	Position
Australia (Kent Music Report)	70
Canada Top Singles (RPM)	49
US Billboard Hot 100	53
US Cash Box Top 100	77

== Other appearances ==
- The OMD greatest hits albums The Best of OMD, The OMD Singles and Messages: The Greatest Hits.
- "If You Leave" was featured in the compilation album Lost & Found: Reconstruction.
- The song appeared on the Family Guy episode "First Blood" as a reference to Pretty in Pink.

== Cover versions ==
- "If You Leave" was covered by pop-punk band Good Charlotte for the soundtrack of Not Another Teen Movie (2001), a parody on teen movies like Pretty in Pink.
- A cover version by Nada Surf was used on an episode of The O.C. It is played as a tribute to the John Hughes film Pretty in Pink where the original OMD version of the song appeared. It was released on Music from the OC: Mix 2.
- LMP covered the song on their album A Century of Song.
- In 2001, "If You Leave" was covered by Seattle synthpop band Dyed Emotions on the OMD tribute compilation Messages: Modern Synthpop Artists Cover Orchestral Manoeuvres in the Dark.
- Indie rock band Rafter covered the song for the compilation album Guilt by Association Vol. 2, released in 2008.
- In 2021 "If You Leave" was covered by the American singer-songwriter and musician Angel Olsen for her fourth extended play, Aisles, consisting of five cover versions of popular songs from the 1980s.
