= Navigation: The OMD B-Sides =

Compilation album (B-sides) by Orchestral Manoeuvres in the Dark
- Released: 14 May 2001
- Recorded: 1979–1991, various studios
- Genre: Synth-pop
- Length: 73:13
- Label: Virgin
- Producer: various

Orchestral Manoeuvres in the Dark chronology
Peel Sessions 1979–1983 (2000)	Navigation: The OMD B-Sides (2001)	OMD Live: Architecture & Morality & More (2008)

Navigation: The OMD B-Sides is the fourth compilation album by the English electronic band Orchestral Manoeuvres in the Dark (OMD). It was released on 14 May 2001 by Virgin Records and contains a variety of B-sides from their Dindisc and Virgin output.

== Critical reception ==
Professional ratings
Review scores
Source	Rating
AllMusic	3/5 stars

Trouser Press wrote, "Navigation: The OMD B-Sides is an essential document for fans. [Andy] McCluskey and [Paul] Humphreys always took care to put worthwhile tracks on the backs of their singles, and nearly all of the songs here were worthy of inclusion on albums." Aaron Badgley in AllMusic noted that "A lot of the music is instrumental and not what casual fans are used to hearing from OMD", but opined that the album "is no less enjoyable than their biggest hits". He asserted that the record is "a must" for enthusiasts of the band.

== Track listing ==
=== CD: Virgin / CDV 2938 (UK) ===
All tracks are written by Orchestral Manoeuvres in the Dark, except where noted.

No.	Title	Writer(s)	A-side	Length
1.	"Almost" (previously unreleased version)	Paul Humphreys, Andy McCluskey	n/a, recorded in 1979	3:44
2.	"I Betray My Friends"	Humphreys, McCluskey	"Red Frame/White Light" (1980)	3:52
3.	"Waiting for the Man"	Lou Reed	"Messages" (1980)	2:56
4.	"Annex"	Humphreys, McCluskey	"Enola Gay" (1980)	4:31
5.	"Sacred Heart"	Humphreys, McCluskey	"Souvenir" (1981)	3:27
6.	"The Romance of the Telescope (Unfinished)"	Humphreys, McCluskey	"Joan of Arc" (1981)	3:20
7.	"Navigation"	Humphreys, McCluskey	"Maid of Orleans" (1982)	3:27
8.	"4–Neu"		"Genetic Engineering" (1983)	3:33
9.	"66 & Fading" (Edit)		"Telegraph" (1983)	2:25
10.	"Her Body in My Soul"		"Locomotion" (1984)	4:42
11.	"The Avenue"		"Locomotion" (1984)	4:12
12.	"Garden City"		"Tesla Girls" (1984)	4:06
13.	"Concrete Hands"		"So in Love" (1985)	3:48
14.	"Firegun"		"La Femme Accident" (1985)	4:38
15.	"This Town"		"(Forever) Live and Die" (1986)	3:49
16.	"Gravity Never Failed"		"Dreaming" (1988)	3:24
17.	"Burning"	OMD, Stuart Kershaw	"Sailing on the Seven Seas" (1991)	4:15
18.	"Sugar Tax"		"Then You Turn Away" (1991)	4:05
19.	"(The Angels Keep Turning) The Wheels of the Universe"		free one-sided 7" vinyl with limited edition of Junk Culture album (1984)	4:51
