= Never Turn Away =

Single by Orchestral Manoeuvres in the Dark

from the album Junk Culture
- B-side: "Wrappup"; "Waiting for the Man" (live)
- Released: 29 October 1984
- Studio: AIR (Salem, Montserrat)
- Genre: New wave
- Length: 3:57
- Label: Virgin
- Songwriter: OMD
- Producers: Brian Tench; OMD

Orchestral Manoeuvres in the Dark singles chronology
"Tesla Girls" (1984)	"Never Turn Away" (1984)	"So in Love" (1985)

Music video
- "Never Turn Away" on YouTube

"Never Turn Away" is a song by the English electronic band Orchestral Manoeuvres in the Dark (OMD), released on 29 October 1984 by Virgin Records as the fourth and final single from their fifth studio album, Junk Culture (1984). Paul Humphreys sings lead vocals on the track.

== History ==
The song was first featured on the band's "Showcase Tour" in September 1983 in an unfinished form with the unofficial title of "The Never Song". The short tour, intended to re-establish the band after the commercial flop of Dazzle Ships earlier in the year, also featured other new songs which would appear on the Junk Culture studio album in 1984, as well as the future "Never Turn Away" B-side "Wrappup". Although writing credits are attributed to "OMD", "Never Turn Away" was written by Paul Humphreys, with the title being provided by frontman Andy McCluskey. Humphreys said in 1987, "I've never been very confident and it's a song about that, almost paranoia, I suppose. It was about my own indecisiveness... I don't think that you necessarily feel better afterwards, though."

"Never Turn Away" was the band's second single to feature Humphreys on vocals after "Souvenir" in 1981.

== Critical reception ==
The Reading Eagle writer Carl Brown Jr. named "Never Turn Away" as the standout track from Junk Culture, calling it "a soft, subtle song that succeeds from both a melodic and lyrical viewpoint". Conversely, Smash Hits reviewer and Pet Shop Boys vocalist, Neil Tennant – otherwise a fan of OMD – described the track as "sad, drifting music" and "boring".

Retrospectively, John Bergstrom in PopMatters noted a "beautiful" song, while Classic Pop's Barry Page observed a "wistful number" with "multi-tracked vocals giving it an ethereal resonance evocative of [1981's] 'Souvenir'." Ned Raggett of AllMusic identified the "elegiac" song as a highlight on its parent album.

== B-sides ==
The song "Wrappup" is a dubbed version of the song "All Wrapped Up" (which features on Junk Culture). The second B-side, a live cover version of the Velvet Underground's "Waiting for the Man", only featured on the extended version of the single (the extended version of "Never Turn Away" has an extra verse added to the song). The live version of "Waiting for the Man" was recorded at the Hammersmith Odeon in London on the Junk Culture tour, featuring additional brass parts by Graham and Neil Weir who had worked with the band on the Junk Culture album. The 7" picture disc features a unique extended version of "Never Turn Away".

"Wrappup" is available on the bonus disc of the 2015 deluxe re-issue of Junk Culture, although on initial pressings "All Wrapped Up" was included in its place by mistake. The disc also includes the extended version of "Never Turn Away".

== Track listing ==
All tracks written and composed by OMD; except where noted.

7" vinyl

1. "Never Turn Away" – 3:57
2. "Wrappup" – 4:00

7" vinyl picture disc

1. "Never Turn Away" – 4:34
2. "Wrappup" – 4:00

12" vinyl

1. "Never Turn Away" (extended version) – 6:31
2. "Wrappup" – 4:00
3. "Waiting for the Man" (live) (Lou Reed) – 3:31

== Charts ==
Chart (1984)	Peak position
Ireland (IRMA)	29
UK Singles (Official Charts)	70
