= Rudi Esch =

German musician, author and music consultant

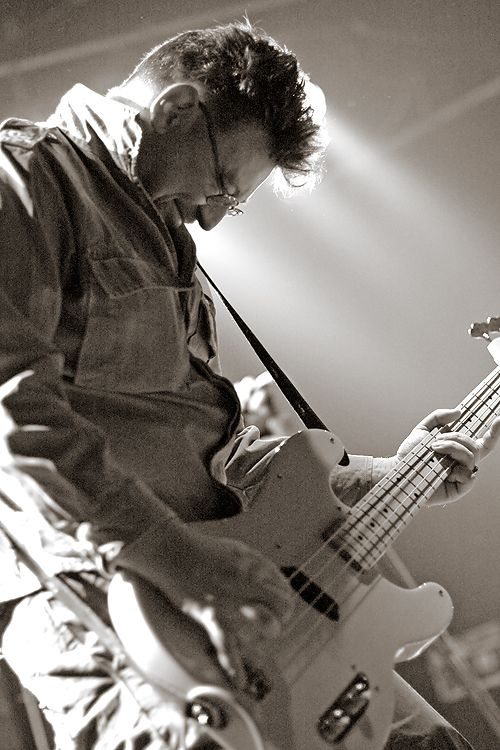
:Ruediger Esch

Rüdiger "Rudi" Esch (born 10 August 1966 in Düsseldorf) is a German musician, author and music consultant. As a musician, he is best known as the former bass player for industrial band Die Krupps and the punk band Male.

== Career ==
In 1982, Esch founded the German-speaking punk band Feine Deutsche Art (FDA) as principal composer and lyricist. The band's first concert was supporting Die Toten Hosen in 1983. Further concerts in 1984, including supporting Family 5 and Stunde X, followed in Düsseldorf and the surrounding area. Their song Mit dem Rücken an der Wand (With Your Back Against the Wall) was included on local sampler Punk’s Not Dead. In 1985, FDA dissolved and a retrospective was issued in 1990 by Teenage Rebel Records.

Based on Jim Jarmusch's film Stranger than Paradise, Esch founded a band of the same name in 1986. The group mainly played English, melancholic guitar pop in the style of The Cure, Siouxsie and the Banshees and Joy Division. Esch acted as a lyricist, composer and bassist. In 1987, Esch founded the Strange Records label in collaboration with the Düsseldorf's city government. His band was discovered by Klaus Dinger and in the same year, recordings took place in La Düsseldorf's Düsseldorf studio, as well as performing together in concert. Growing from the collaboration, a new group was formed around Dinger in 1988, which went on to release an LP as Die Engel Des Herrn (The Angels of the Lord).

In 1989, Esch joined the reformed band Die Krupps, who had already achieved cult status in the early 1980s with albums such as Stahlwerksynfonie and Wahre Arbeit / Wahre Lohn. Between 1989 and 1997 Esch recorded five albums and the band played more than 200 concerts in Europe and North America. After a break of several years, Die Krupps performed a reunion show in Leipzig in 2005. In 2011 on their 30th anniversary, Die Krupps participated in a double headliner tour through Europe together with Nitzer Ebb and played at the Kinetics Festival in Montreal and the Amphi Festival in Cologne.

From 1990 to 1996 Esch studied German philosophy at the Heinrich Heine University Düsseldorf with a focus on aesthetics. Esch founded EPAG Enterprise Multimedia AG together with his brother Holger Esch in 1999.

Rüdiger Esch had been working on a book about the electronic music history of his home town since 2012, which was published in October 2014 under the title Electri_city – Elektronische Musik aus Düsseldorf published by Suhrkamp Verlag. The book received significant press coverage in Germany. An English translation of the book appeared in 2016, entitled Electri_City: The Düsseldorf School of Electronic Music published by Omnibus Press. Esch is also co-author of a biography of the band Deutsche Amerikanishe Freundschaft with Miriam Spies, which was officially authorised by the two band members Robert Görl and Gabi Delgado-López.

Using the title of his first book, Esch has been organising the Electri_City Conference in Düsseldorf since 2015, where lectures and concerts explore the history of electronic music. Participants have included OMD's Andy McCluskey, John Foxx and Anne Clark. The conference also saw the release of two accompanying CD compilations on Grönland Records.

Esch lives with his family on Graceland in the southern part of Düsseldorf.

== Publications ==
- Electri_city – Elektronische Musik aus Düsseldorf, Suhrkamp Verlag, Berlin 2014, ISBN 978-3-518-46464-9.
- Electri_City: The Düsseldorf School of Electronic Music, Omnibus Press, London 2016, ISBN 978-1-78558-119-9.
- John Paul Jones: Der Multiinstrumentalist. In: Heel, Franz-Christoph (Hg.): Led Zeppelin (Rockportrait), Auflage: 1, 2008, ISBN 978-3-89880-929-0, S. 34.
- Das ist DAF: Biographie, Berlin, Schwarzkopf & Schwarzkopf 2017. ISBN 978-3-86265-663-9.
