= Souvenir (song) =

- "Souvenir" 7" sleeve

Single by Orchestral Manoeuvres in the Dark

from the album Architecture & Morality
- B-side: "Motion & Heart" (Amazon Version); "Sacred Heart"
- Released: 21 August 1981
- Recorded: 1981
- Genre: Electronic; synth-pop
- Length: 3:39; 4:16 (10" extended souvenir)
- Label: Dindisc
- Songwriters: Paul Humphreys, Martin Cooper
- Producer: Mike Howlett

Orchestral Manoeuvres in the Dark singles chronology
"Enola Gay" (1980)	"Souvenir" (1981)	"Joan of Arc" (1981)

Alternative cover
- "Souvenir" 10" sleeve

Official video
- "Souvenir" on YouTube

"Souvenir" is a song written by Paul Humphreys and Martin Cooper of the English electronic band Orchestral Manoeuvres in the Dark (OMD), and released as the first single from the group's 1981 album Architecture & Morality. Sung by Humphreys, the track is characterised by its use of slowed-down choral loops, and showcases OMD's early approach of utilising a synthesizer hook in place of a vocal chorus. The song has garnered praise from critics and fellow artists, with its synth-driven intro being noted as particularly influential.

"Souvenir" became an international hit for the band. Peaking at number 3 on the UK singles chart, it remains the group's highest-charting single in their home country, along with 1991's "Sailing on the Seven Seas". The song also reached the top 10 in several European countries, including topping the charts in Spain and Portugal.

== Background ==
A tape consisting of slowed-down loops of a choir tuning up lent by ex-OMD member Dave Hughes had been the initial inspiration for the song. The composition was difficult, and the group was initially tempted to abandon the track. It was originally titled "The Choir Song" and the working title remained up until the final week for Peter Saville's artwork delivery.

Keyboard player Paul Humphreys provided lead vocals and had co-written the song with Martin Cooper, who had played live with OMD and was becoming part of the group. A synthesizer hook substitutes for a vocal chorus, as with other OMD compositions. Frontman and co-founder Andy McCluskey initially disliked the track. He said in 1987, "I think you can always make a better case for a song you've written on your own... But everyone seems to think I hated 'Souvenir' just because it was Paul's song – not so. I genuinely thought it was a bit soppy, and since I hadn't written it, I found it hard to relate to." McCluskey's view of the song changed thereafter: "Nine months later – and it wasn't just 'cause ['Souvenir'] was a monster hit – I got it. I realised that it was a beautiful, beautiful piece of ethereal melody."

An extended version of Souvenir (with an additional verse) was released as a 10" single and was later included as a bonus on the digitally remastered copies of Architecture & Morality. It was the second time the group had used this unusual release format, the first being the 10" single for "Messages" in May 1980.

Unlike successive hit singles "Joan of Arc" and "Maid of Orleans" from the Architecture & Morality album, "Souvenir" has never been reissued as a standalone CD single release.

The title of the track was used for a documentary DVD about the reformed OMD, released in 2007 by Aspect Television.

== Reception ==
Cashbox named "Souvenir", and "Did It in a Minute" by Hall & Oates, as their top "singles picks" for the week of 20 March 1982. The magazine called "Souvenir" an "insidiously catchy and melodic synthesizer glissando", and OMD's "strongest U.S. bid yet". Sunie Fletcher of Record Mirror described the track as a "pleasant slowie" that is "very reminiscent of French movie music", while the Vancouver Sun's Neal Hall said it "underscores the band's talent at writing subtle, intelligent pop songs". Pete Silverton of Smash Hits was less enthused, portraying the track as "ethereal but rather hollow". The magazine later expressed an alternate viewpoint, observing a "strong" single that features 1981's "intro of the year".

"Souvenir" entered the UK singles chart on 29 August 1981 at no. 41, reaching no. 23 the following week. It was featured for the first time on Top of the Pops that week, helping the single to enter the Top 10 the next week, and then reach its peak of no. 3 on 15 September. "Souvenir" was the 28th best-selling single in the UK in 1981.

Retrospectively, Ned Raggett of AllMusic praised Humphreys' "warm and beautiful lead role" and described the mid-song instrumental break as "especially inspired". Classic Pop's Mark Lindores labelled the track a "shimmering synth-pop masterpiece", while Trouser Press hailed it as "magnificent" and "one of the most majestic singles of the post-punk era".

== Legacy ==
"Souvenir" has been named as one of the best songs of 1981, (Note: See:) and has appeared in rankings such as Classic Pop's "Top 100 Singles of the 80s", Les Inrockuptibles' all-time "1000 Essential Pieces", and Virgin Radio UK's "Top 500 Songs of All-Time" poll. American Songwriter called it "dreamy and ethereal synth-pop at its finest... with a synth intro that influenced plenty of similar musicians throughout the rest of the 80s". The Arts Desk also noted how the "gorgeous" intro inspired other artists, in particular "heavily flavouring Ryan Paris's Euro-gorgonzola hit 'Dolce Vita'."

"Souvenir" was influential on Pet Shop Boys founders Neil Tennant and Chris Lowe, who established a common ground in their love of the track. Writing in OMD's official 2018 biography, Tennant said, "'Souvenir' is such a beautiful and wistful song with that sparse early Eighties electronic sound. I still play it." In a 1981 interview with BBC Radio 1, Godley & Creme named OMD's "Souvenir" and "Enola Gay" as two of their favourite singles of recent memory. Singer Kim Wilde and Thompson Twins frontman Tom Bailey have named "Souvenir" as one of their favourite tracks from the period, the latter stating, "What a melody. It's a fantastic piece of work." Erasure vocalist Andy Bell said that he is always moved to tears upon hearing the song.

Neil Hannon of the Divine Comedy has drawn inspiration from British synth-pop, citing "Souvenir" as a "special favourite". He said, "[It's] probably the single record that I have played most in my life. I just kept it on repeat." The Charlatans frontman Tim Burgess described the song as "so atmospheric" and an "absolute classic". Jonn Penney of Ned's Atomic Dustbin selected "Souvenir" as the one track he would like to be played at his funeral, adding, "I'd want people to have that euphoric feeling that you sometimes get, when you remember something special that happened to you. This song somehow captures that for me." The artists Underground Lovers, Blouse, Ricky Wilde, Telekinesis, and longtime Arcade Fire orchestrator, Owen Pallett, have cited "Souvenir" as an inspiration. In 2011, Princess Chelsea named it her favourite track. Multiple artists have covered or remixed the song.

== B-sides ==
There are two songs on the B-sides of the 7" and the 10" singles, "Motion & Heart" (Amazon Version) and "Sacred Heart". The original version of "Motion & Heart" can be found on the Organisation album. The Amazon Version was recorded at Amazon Studios in Kirkby as a possible single after "Enola Gay", but that plan was dropped. Both songs are produced by OMD and can be found on the remastered re-issues of Architecture & Morality. "Sacred Heart" is also included on Navigation: The OMD B-Sides.

"Sacred Heart" was sampled by German musician Console for his instrumental piece "Crabcraft", which appeared on the album Rocket in the Pocket (1998). Icelandic singer Björk later added a vocal to the track, retitling it "Heirloom", and included it on the album Vespertine (2001).

== Music video ==
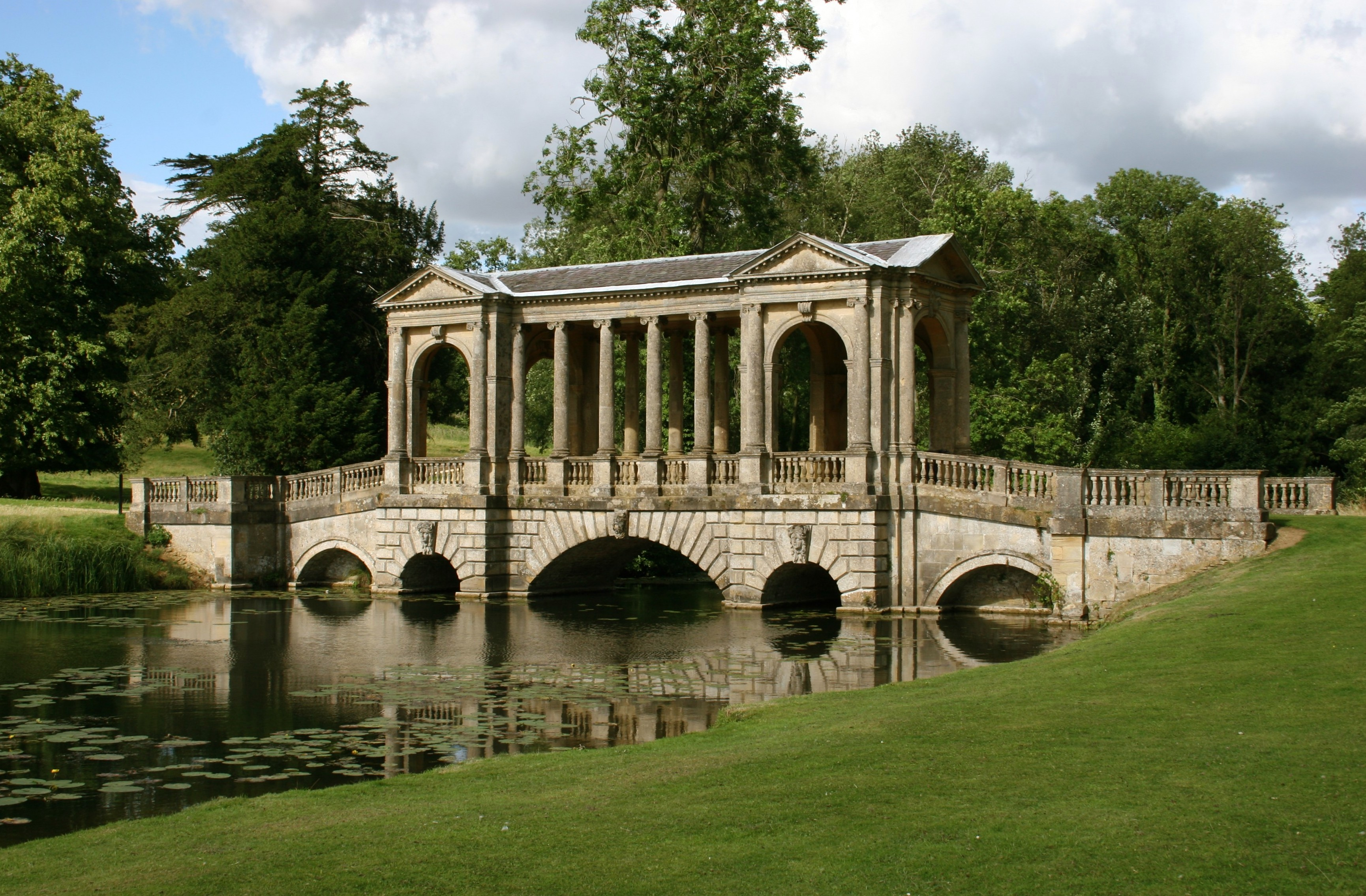
The Palladian Bridge at Stowe House

The song's promo video was filmed by Peter Saville in the grounds of Stowe House (the home of Stowe School, in Buckinghamshire, England) and Blenheim Palace Park, in Oxfordshire. It was an early MTV favourite and is among OMD's more well-known videos.

Andy McCluskey is seen driving around in a classic red, convertible Volkswagen Karmann Ghia (property of Peter Saville), while Paul Humphreys stands on, and leans against the pillars of, the Palladian Bridge while singing. The promo video is included on the video version of The Best of OMD, the bonus DVD of the 2007 reissue of Architecture & Morality and the DVD included in the 2008 Compilation album Messages: Greatest Hits.

== Live performances ==
The song was performed at live shows on a regular basis following the Architecture & Morality tour in 1981, except for when Paul Humphreys was no longer with the band during the 1990s. A live performance from 1981 was filmed for the concert "Live at the Theatre Royal, Drury Lane" in December 1981, initially released on VHS (1982) and LaserDisc (1984) and later on DVD.

The song was also performed with the Royal Liverpool Philharmonic in June 2009 as documented by the Electricity DVD release.

On 26 July 2015, Paul Humphreys was unable to perform at the 80s Rewind Festival in Scotland, and so the vocal was sung for the first time by Andy McCluskey. On seeing a clip of the performance from his hospital bed, Humphreys said he felt he had "entered some kind of alternative universe".

== Sleeve design ==
The sleeve was designed by Peter Saville and Brett Wickens. The 7" sleeve has a die-cut hole in the middle, revealing the label. On the label is a picture of a Düsseldorf street scene. For the 10", this picture is printed on the sleeve. It was the first single released with OMD as the band name. The European releases have different artwork, some almost identical to the UK releases. A Canadian release of the 10" has green transparent vinyl.

== Alternative and cover versions ==
In May 1991, DMC released a 12" vinyl single with the "Postcards from the Edge Mix" by Brothers in Rhythm.

In 1998, four remixes of the song were made by Moby for the intended second disc of The OMD Singles. The second disc was dropped, but the remixes appeared on various The OMD Remixes EPs. In 2003, the double disc version was released in France only, which included all four remixes.

Joyce Manor, Mike "μ-Ziq" Paradinas, Moth Wranglers, and Mark Morriss of the Bluetones are among those to have covered the song.

== Track listings ==
7" single - UK DinDisc DIN 24

Sceneside A:

1. "Souvenir" (Paul Humphreys, Martin Cooper) – 3:39

Typeside B:

1. "Motion & Heart" (Amazon Version) (P. Humphreys, Andy McCluskey) – 3:07
2. "Sacred Heart" (P. Humphreys, A. McCluskey) – 3:30

10" single - UK DinDisc DIN 24-10

A-side :

1. "Extended Souvenir" – 4:16

B-side :

1. "Motion & Heart" (Amazon Version) – 3:07
2. "Sacred Heart" – 3:30

== Charts ==
=== Weekly charts ===
Chart (1981)	Peak position
Australia (Kent Music Report)	57
Belgium (Ultratop 50 Flanders)	16
Ireland (IRMA)	9
Italy (Musica e dischi)	20
Netherlands (Dutch Top 40)	29
Netherlands (Single Top 100)	38
Portugal (Música & Som)	1
Spain (AFYVE)	1
UK Singles (Official Charts)	3
West Germany (GfK)	39

=== Year-end charts ===
Chart (1981)	Position
UK Singles (OCC)	28

== Certifications ==
Region	Certification	Certified units/sales
United Kingdom (BPI)	Silver	250,000^{^}
^{^} Shipments figures based on certification alone.
