= Crush (Orchestral Manoeuvres in the Dark album) =

Studio album by Orchestral Manoeuvres in the Dark
- Released: 17 June 1985
- Recorded: 1984–1985
- Studios: Amazon (Liverpool); The Manor (Shipton-on-Cherwell); Advision (London)
- Genres: Synth-pop; pop rock
- Length: 38:37
- Label: Virgin
- Producer: Stephen Hague

Orchestral Manoeuvres in the Dark chronology
Junk Culture (1984)	Crush (1985)	The Pacific Age (1986)

Singles from Crush
- 1. "So in Love" Released: 13 May 1985; 2. "Secret" Released: 8 July 1985; 3. "La Femme Accident" Released: 14 October 1985

Crush is the sixth studio album by the English electronic band Orchestral Manoeuvres in the Dark (OMD), released on 17 June 1985 by Virgin Records. It is the first of two OMD studio albums to be produced by Stephen Hague. Aimed primarily at the US market, Crush is notable for moving the group towards a more polished sound, although elements of earlier experimentation are still present. During recording the band employed a greater use of organic instrumentation than in the past.

Crush was completed within a limited timescale, with group members later expressing regret over not challenging label-imposed time constraints. The hectic recording and promotion schedule served to diminish morale among the band, who also had reservations about Hague's sleek production. Crush ultimately received positive reviews from critics but was met with resistance from sections of the OMD fanbase. It became the group's only top-40 album on the US Billboard 200, and remained on Canada's RPM chart for 43 weeks from 13 July 1985 to 17 May 1986. Of the three singles taken from the record, "So in Love" was OMD's first hit on the US Billboard Hot 100, where it peaked at number 25.

A long-form video, Crush: The Movie, was also released, showing the band discussing their career and performing the songs from the album.

== Background ==
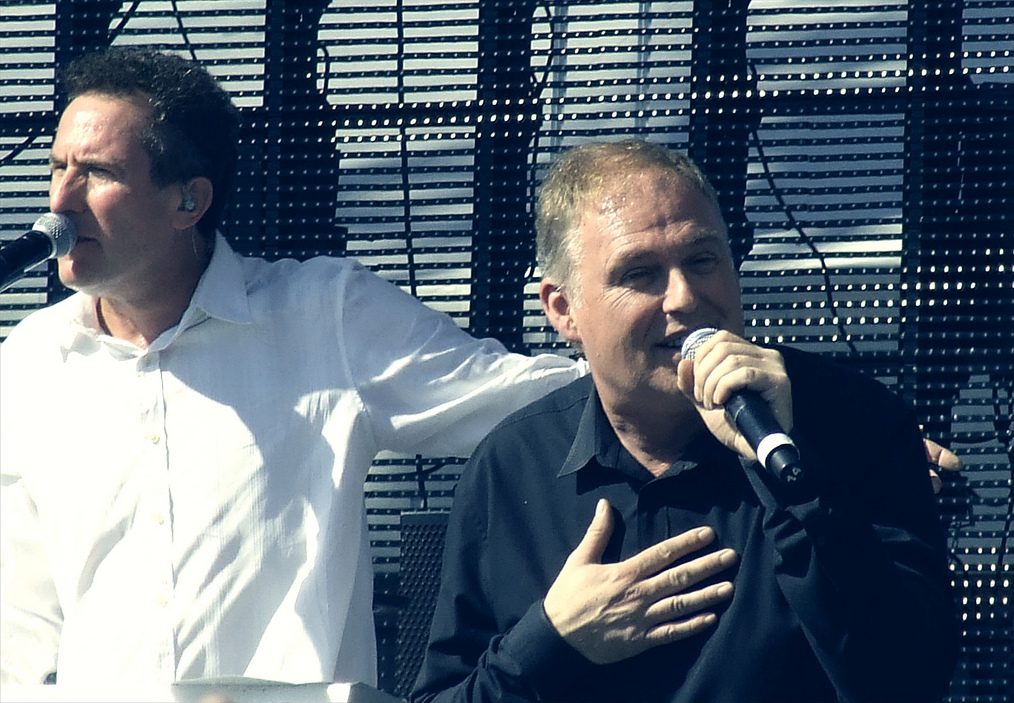
OMD performing in 2011. The band were keen to approximate their live form on Crush, although producer Stephen Hague opted to introduce a more polished sound to the US market.

With OMD's Gramophone Suite studio now dismantled, the band commenced work at the more sophisticated Amazon Studios (also in Liverpool) in late 1984. The group booked Amazon for two months and tried to embrace a more relaxed, almost spontaneous approach to songwriting. Bandleaders Andy McCluskey and Paul Humphreys averaged a new composition every two days, with much of the lyrical content coloured by McCluskey's blossoming relationship with girlfriend (and future wife) Toni. OMD continued to make use of the Fairlight CMI sampler keyboard, which had been introduced on predecessor Junk Culture (1984). The group employed a greater use of organic instrumentation during the sessions, as many of the Fairlight-generated sounds came to be replaced by the live playing of Martin Cooper and Malcolm Holmes (and session musicians Graham and Neil Weir). Humphreys explained, "We were looking for a more band-type sound, since a lot of people have been telling us for ages that they like the way we sound on stage."

As OMD set their sights on breaking America, Virgin Records suggested American producer Stephen Hague, of whom the band were fans. The group began recording with Hague in spring 1985 at The Manor, Shipton-on-Cherwell. Hague would heavily influence the feel of Crush, employing a meticulous approach and largely streamlining the band's sound. OMD had reservations about Hague's production, which McCluskey felt approached "dullness"; Humphreys admitted publicly at the time, "It's a little smoother than we would have done it ourselves." Mixing was completed at Advision, London. The pressure of finishing the album on time, while working 19-hour days in a basement room with "very peculiar acoustics", served to damage rapport between the exhausted group members. Humphreys briefly quit the band during the making of the record.

Despite its polished sound, Crush features elements of the group's trademark early experimentation. Sampling was extensively used on both the title track and "The Lights Are Going Out", with the former utilising tuned snippets of Japanese television commercials recorded by McCluskey; Humphreys' then-wife Maureen provided additional vocals on both songs. Elsewhere, "88 Seconds in Greensboro" was inspired by a TV documentary about the Greensboro massacre of 1979, and was recorded in one live take. "Hold You" was contemplated as the follow-up single to "So in Love", and a music video was made, but the band ultimately reneged on the idea. Other tracks considered for inclusion were "Heaven Is" and "Southern". The title Crush refers to the number of love songs on the album.

== Cover art ==
OMD intended to use a painting by American artist Edward Hopper for the sleeve art. Martin Kirkup, the band's then-manager, stated, "I remember Andy McCluskey telling me the reason he wanted a Hopper-style painting on the cover of Crush was that he had always felt there was a lot of melancholy in the paintings of Hopper and he felt that it matched the melancholy that was in the songs." After learning of the enormous fees required to reproduce Hopper's work, the group instead hired artist Paul Slater to imitate Hopper's style (in conjunction with XL Design). Slater based his artwork on Hopper's Early Sunday Morning (1930).

== Critical reception ==
Professional ratings
Review scores
Source	Rating
All Music Guide to Rock	5/5 stars
Calgary Herald	B+
Classic Pop	4/5 stars
Mercury & Herald	9/10
Number One	5/5 stars
PopMatters	7/10
Record Mirror	5/5 stars
The Rolling Stone Album Guide	3.5/5 stars
Smash Hits	8/10
Winnipeg Free Press	3.5/4 stars

Crush met with positive reviews. It received full five-star ratings from Debbi Voller of Number One and Robin Smith at Record Mirror, the former writing, "Crush... is a collection of remarkable songs. Each one has a life and mood of its own and OMD have cleverly combined atmosphere with instant appeal." Melody Maker's Helen Fitzgerald named Crush the best OMD album to date, adding, "As a pop record it's sublime, intricate and unyieldingly persuasive, it doesn't give up its secrets lightly and the excitement is in the chase." According to Ian Cranna of Smash Hits, the album delivers "what OMD do best – strong, melodic songs – in a more lush, er, orchestral setting while retaining that passionate punch... it's the welcome return of the thinking person's dance music." The Guardian's Robin Denselow said that while the group had reined in their sonic exploration, they were "still able to roll out the strong melodies" and "swirling pretty songs".

American magazine Cashbox noted the "accessible" nature of Crush, whose increased use of organic instrumentation yields a "warmer, more inviting sound than [on] previous outings". Glen Gore-Smith of the Winnipeg Free Press wrote, "On Crush, the band has found a missing link between pop art and commerce. And, rather than compromising itself, OMD maneuvers with integrity." The Calgary Herald's James Muretich said of the record, "It emphasizes danceable electro-pop at the expense of experimentation... Crush won't bowl one over, but will seduce one gradually with its elegance and wit." Len Righi of The Morning Call suggested that fans of the group's earlier output "may be shaking their heads... Which is not to say the songs aren't catchy or well-crafted."

In a retrospective review, AllMusic journalist Dave Connolly unfavourably compared Crush to previous OMD efforts, observing a "lightweight" album that "represents a nearly complete reinvention of the band's original ideals." On the other hand, the record was awarded a full five stars in the All Music Guide to Rock (2002), where editor Stephen Thomas Erlewine asserted that it "may be less adventurous than [OMD's] earlier work" but is still a "thoroughly winning album". Paul Evans of Rolling Stone wrote, "With Crush, pure, luscious melody rules. Disowned (of course) by the band's cult, Crush is OMD at its most purely pop—'So in Love' and 'Secret' are flawless." PopMatters critic John Bergstrom had praise for the "wonderful" Edward Hopper-inspired cover art and the "effortlessly melodic, surprisingly timeless" musical content, adding that "OMD had never sounded this sleek, this sexy, this cool before, nor would they again."

== Legacy ==
Crush has been listed as one of the best and most-played albums of 1985; Cashbox journalist Peter Berk, and listeners of rock station CFNY-FM, considered it to be among the 10 best of the year. The record was placed at no. 141 in CMJ's "Top 1000, 1979–1989". In his 2023 list of "The 50 Greatest Synth-Pop Albums of All Time", Paste critic Matt Mitchell included OMD's Architecture & Morality (1981) but stated that Crush – excluded under a "one album per artist" rule – was "equally worthy". Kevin Hearn of rock group Barenaked Ladies recalled "loving" Crush. He conveyed a deep affection for "Secret", adding that "the title track, with its wonderfully strange sequence of samples, particularly appealed to [his] expanding musical tastes". Meric Long of indie band the Dodos named "Secret" his favourite song of all time, and electronic musician Cosmicity recorded a 2001 cover version of "Bloc Bloc Bloc".

Although McCluskey and Humphreys have expressed regret over not challenging label-imposed time constraints during the development of Crush, Humphreys considers it one of his favourite OMD records. Significant resources were expended on trying to make the album a success in the US, Humphreys noting, "We had a saying: 'In trying to break America, America broke us'... We got the success we craved, but we exhausted ourselves getting it." Morale would continue to fracture during the making of 1986 follow-up The Pacific Age (also produced by Hague), preceding a line-up split in the late 1980s.

== Deluxe re-issue ==
In July 2025 OMD announced that a 40th anniversary deluxe re-issue of Crush would be released on 10 October of that year. As well as extended versions and B-sides, the reissue features seven previously unheard tracks from the album's multitrack sessions, newly mixed by Humphreys. It was released on CD (digital) and clear and black vinyl. Some bonus tracks appear on the CD version only.

== Track listing ==
All tracks are written by Andy McCluskey/Paul Humphreys, except where noted.

Side one
No.	Title	Writer(s)	Length
1.	"So in Love"	McCluskey; Humphreys; Stephen Hague	3:29
2.	"Secret"	Humphreys	3:56
3.	"Bloc Bloc Bloc"		3:28
4.	"Women III"		4:26
5.	"Crush"		4:27

Side two
No.	Title	Writer(s)	Length
6.	"88 Seconds in Greensboro"		4:15
7.	"The Native Daughters of the Golden West"		3:58
8.	"La Femme Accident"	McCluskey	2:50
9.	"Hold You"	McCluskey; Malcolm Holmes	4:00
10.	"The Lights Are Going Out"		3:57
Total length:			38:37

== Personnel ==
Credits are adapted from the liner notes of Crush.

Orchestral Manoeuvres in the Dark

- Paul Humphreys – vocals; electronic keyboards; piano
- Andy McCluskey – vocals; guitar; bass guitar; electronic keyboards
- Malcolm Holmes – drums; electronic and acoustic percussion
- Martin Cooper – vocals; saxophone; electronic keyboards

Additional musicians

- Stephen Hague – electronic keyboards; guitar
- Graham Weir – trombone; electric guitar
- Neil Weir – trumpet
- Maureen Humphreys – additional vocals

== Charts ==
=== Weekly charts ===
1995 weekly chart performance for Crush
Chart (1985)	Peak position
Canada Top Albums/CDs (RPM)	36
Dutch Albums (Album Top 100)	15
European Albums (Music & Media)	21
German Albums (Offizielle Top 100)	23
New Zealand Albums (RMNZ)	23
Swedish Albums (Sverigetopplistan)	38
UK Albums (Official Charts)	13
US Billboard 200	38

2025 weekly chart performance for Crush
Chart (2025)	Peak position
German Rock & Metal Albums (Offizielle Top 100)	11

=== Year-end charts ===
Year-end chart performance for Crush
Chart (1985)	Position
Dutch Albums (Album Top 100)	99

== Certifications ==
Certifications for Crush
Region	Certification	Certified units/sales
Canada (Music Canada)	Gold	50,000^{^}
United Kingdom (BPI)	Silver	60,000^{^}
^{^} Shipments figures based on certification alone.
