= So in Love (Orchestral Manoeuvres in the Dark song) =

Single by Orchestral Manoeuvres in the Dark

from the album Crush
- B-side: "Concrete Hands", "Maria Gallante", "White Trash (Live)"
- Released: 13 May 1985
- Studio: Amazon Studios (Liverpool); The Manor (Shipton-on-Cherwell)
- Genre: Synth-pop; new wave
- Length: 3:29
- Label: Virgin
- Songwriters: Paul Humphreys; Andy McCluskey; Stephen Hague
- Producer: Stephen Hague

Orchestral Manoeuvres in the Dark singles chronology
| "Never Turn Away" (1984) | "So in Love" (1985) | "Secret" (1985) |

Alternative cover
- 7" double pack (limited edition)

Music video
- "Orchestral Manoeuvres In The Dark - So In Love" on YouTube

"So in Love" is a song by the English electronic band Orchestral Manoeuvres in the Dark (OMD), released as the first single from their sixth studio album Crush (1985). It reached the top 30 of both the UK singles chart and the US Billboard Hot 100, becoming their first entry on the latter. The track was a top 10 hit in Belgium and Holland.

The single's artwork and its accompanying promotional video were influenced by the Mexican Day of the Dead festival.

== Song history ==
Although "So in Love" was the first single from Crush, it was one of the last songs written for the album. It was originally dropped until band member Martin Cooper persuaded Andy McCluskey and Paul Humphreys to make a demo for the song. Andy McCluskey said it was about the painful end of a relationship. It was their first hit in the United States, after five years of trying to "break" the States, peaking at No. 26 on the Billboard Hot 100. The song reached No. 27 on the UK singles chart.

The single's artwork, by XL Design, and its accompanying promotional video were influenced by the Mexican Day of the Dead festival.

== Single and song versions ==
The first approximately 50,000 copies of the 7" singles were released as a limited edition double-pack in a gatefold sleeve. There were four different 12" singles released, and one of these was also released as a picture disc. The first issue had the normal version of the song on the A-side, with an extended version of "Concrete Hands" on the B-side. Later issues included remixes of "So in Love" on the A-sides. Three remixes were made: the "Extended Version", "New Extended Version", and the "Brand New Extended Version", also known as the "Special American Dance Remix".

== Critical reception and legacy ==
BBC Radio 2 DJ David Hamilton selected "So in Love" as his "Record of the Week", for the week of 13 May 1985. Robin Smith of Record Mirror wrote, "How can you resist a song like 'So in Love'? A misty piece of McCluskey romance tinged with sadness before showing its true claws on the chorus." Cashbox called it a "very melodic, pleasing and well-textured record." On the other hand, Spin's John Leland viewed "So in Love" as a "limp romantic ballad" and accused OMD of "aping the Smiths without the Smiths' ability to transform their banality into awkward grace".

AllMusic critic Dave Thompson later referred to a "rich and sumptuous number" with "adamant beats, swelling synths, and dense textures". Matt Mitchell of Paste observed a "flawless saxophone solo" within a song that, "with every listen, comes unglued by its impossible beauty." AFI lead vocalist Davey Havok recalled, "I became perpetually stuck to my single speaker cassette player, fingers poised to hit record when ['So in Love'] came on the radio. Its warm croon masked cold sentiment." "So in Love" has appeared in lists of the best songs of 1985, and of all time. (Note: See:)

== B-sides ==
"Concrete Hands" was released on the B-side of the 7" singles, and an extended version on the B-side of the 12" singles. It was also released on the compilation album Navigation: The OMD B-Sides (2001). The lyrics were made of lines written on postcards sent by Andy McCluskey to his girlfriend. "Maria Gallante" was an extra song on the 12" releases and can also be found on the second disc of the 7" double pack. The song appeared on CD for the first time in October 2025, on the bonus disc of the 40th anniversary reissue of Crush. The song takes its title from the Caribbean island Marie-Galante, although the lyrics deal with a girl. "White Trash" is a song from the band's fifth studio album Junk Culture (1984). This live recording was recorded at Hammersmith Odeon on 3 October 1984, and was only released on the double 7".

== Music video ==
The official music video for the song was directed by Andy Morahan, and filmed on-location in the Province of Almería, in Spain. The daytime scenes were shot in the village of Alhabia. Additional scenes were filmed in the Tabernas Desert, with night scenes on city streets filmed in the capital Almería (specifically El Paseo and Cabo de Gata Avenue).

== Track listings ==
7" vinyl – UK: Virgin VS 766
| No. | Title | Length |
|---|---|---|
| 1. | "So in Love" | 3:29 |
| 2. | "Concrete Hands" | 3:46 |

2×7" vinyl – UK: Virgin VS 766 (limited edition double pack)
| No. | Title | Length |
|---|---|---|
| 1. | "So in Love" | 3:29 |
| 2. | "Concrete Hands" | 3:46 |
| 3. | "Maria Gallante" | 2:53 |
| 4. | "White Trash" (Live at Hammersmith Odeon) | 4:44 |

12" vinyl – #1 UK: Virgin VS 766-12
| No. | Title | Length |
|---|---|---|
| 1. | "So in Love" | 3:29 |
| 2. | "Concrete Hands" (extended) | 4:15 |
| 3. | "Maria Gallante" | 2:53 |

12" vinyl – #2 UK: Virgin VS 766-12 (same catalogue number, with sticker "New Extended Version")
| No. | Title | Length |
|---|---|---|
| 1. | "So in Love" (extended) | 5:35 |
| 2. | "Concrete Hands" (extended) | 4:15 |
| 3. | "Maria Gallante" | 2:53 |

12" vinyl – #3 UK: Virgin VS 766-13
| No. | Title | Length |
|---|---|---|
| 1. | "So in Love" (new extended version) | 5:35 |
| 2. | "Concrete Hands" (extended) | 4:15 |
| 3. | "Maria Gallante" | 2:53 |

12" vinyl – #4 UK: Virgin VS 766-14 / Virgin VSY 766-14 (picture disc)
| No. | Title | Length |
|---|---|---|
| 1. | "So in Love" (brand new extended version) | 5:35 |
| 2. | "Concrete Hands" (extended) | 4:15 |
| 3. | "Maria Gallante" | 2:53 |

12" vinyl – #1 US: A&M SP-12143 promo
| No. | Title | Length |
|---|---|---|
| 1. | "So in Love" (Special American Dance Remix) (12" version) | 5:20 |
| 2. | "So in Love" (Special American Dance Remix) (7" version) (actually the album version) | 3:29 |

12" vinyl – #2 US: A&M SP-12143
| No. | Title | Length |
|---|---|---|
| 1. | "So in Love" (Special American Dance Remix) | 5:40 |
| 2. | "Concrete Hands" (extended) | 3:29 |

== Charts ==
=== Weekly charts ===
| Chart (1985) | Peak position |
|---|---|
| Australia (Kent Music Report) | 56 |
| Belgium (Ultratop 50 Flanders) | 4 |
| Europe (European Hot 100 Singles) | 28 |
| Ireland (IRMA) | 13 |
| Netherlands (Dutch Top 40) | 7 |
| Netherlands (Single Top 100) | 12 |
| UK Singles (Official Charts) | 27 |
| US Billboard Hot 100 | 26 |
| US Dance Club Songs (Billboard) | 16 |
| US Cash Box Top 100 | 26 |
| West Germany (GfK) | 18 |

=== Year-end charts ===
| Chart (1985) | Position |
|---|---|
| Belgium (Ultratop 50 Flanders) | 38 |
| Netherlands (Dutch Top 40) | 59 |
| Netherlands (Single Top 100) | 79 |
