= Aspect Television =

Aspect Television is an independent television production company established in 1999 and based in Cardiff, Wales which specialises in factual programmes and corporate productions.

== Programmes ==
| Title | Broadcast | Notes |
|---|---|---|
| Bob Humphrys - A Tribute | BBC One Wales November 2008 | Presented by his brother John Humphrys |
| Turning The Tide | BBC 2 Wales March 2009 | Presented by Jamie Owen |

== People ==
- Jamie Owen — co-founder and presenter
- Rob Finighan — co-founder, director and producer
- Adrian Chiles — presenter
