= Enola Gay (song) =

1980 single by Orchestral Manoeuvres in the Dark

- Cover of the original 7" single, designed by Peter Saville.

Single by Orchestral Manoeuvres in the Dark

from the album Organisation
- B-side: "Annex"
- Released: 26 September 1980
- Studio: Ridge Farm Studio (Dorking)
- Genre: Synth-pop; electropop; new wave
- Length: 3:33
- Label: Dindisc
- Songwriter: Andy McCluskey
- Producers: Orchestral Manoeuvres in the Dark; Mike Howlett

Orchestral Manoeuvres in the Dark singles chronology
"Messages" (1980)	"Enola Gay" (1980)	"Souvenir" (1981)

Music video
- "Enola Gay" on YouTube

"Enola Gay" is an anti-war song by the English electronic band Orchestral Manoeuvres in the Dark (OMD), and the only single taken from their second studio album Organisation (1980). Written by lead vocalist and bassist Andy McCluskey, it addresses the atomic bombing of Hiroshima by the aircraft Enola Gay on 6 August 1945, toward the conclusion of World War II. As is typical of early OMD singles, the song features a melodic synthesiser break instead of a sung chorus.

"Enola Gay" met with largely positive reviews but was seen as unlikely to impact the charts; aside from its subject matter, the song faced some resistance due to its being perceived as a gay anthem. It eventually reached No. 8 on the UK Singles Chart, becoming the band's first top 10 entry in their home country. It was also a hit throughout continental Europe, topping the charts in Italy, Portugal and Spain. The track achieved sales in excess of 5 million copies. It has been named as one of the best songs of its era and genre, and, along with 1986's "If You Leave", is regarded as OMD's signature song.

== Composition ==
=== Arrangement ===
Typical of early OMD compositions, the track does not feature a vocal chorus, and is recognisable by its distinctive lead synthesizer hook and ambiguous lyrical content. Most of the melodic parts were recorded on a Korg M-500 Micro-Preset, and the drum machine sound was "about the last thing to go on" the recording. The song is based on the '50s progression, which repeats throughout the entire song. Speaking to Songwriting Magazine, McCluskey stated, "It's a typical linear OMD song, it is the same four chords all the way through and it never varies. The verse, the melody, the middle eight, it's all the same."

Keyboardist Paul Humphreys and OMD manager Paul Collister were not fans of "Enola Gay" (the latter originally threatened to resign if it were released as a single). Collister did, however, believe it was a surefire hit – a view that drummer Malcolm Holmes did not share. Initially proud of the song, McCluskey's confidence wavered: he re-recorded his vocal, but was dissatisfied with the final mix of the track.

=== Title ===
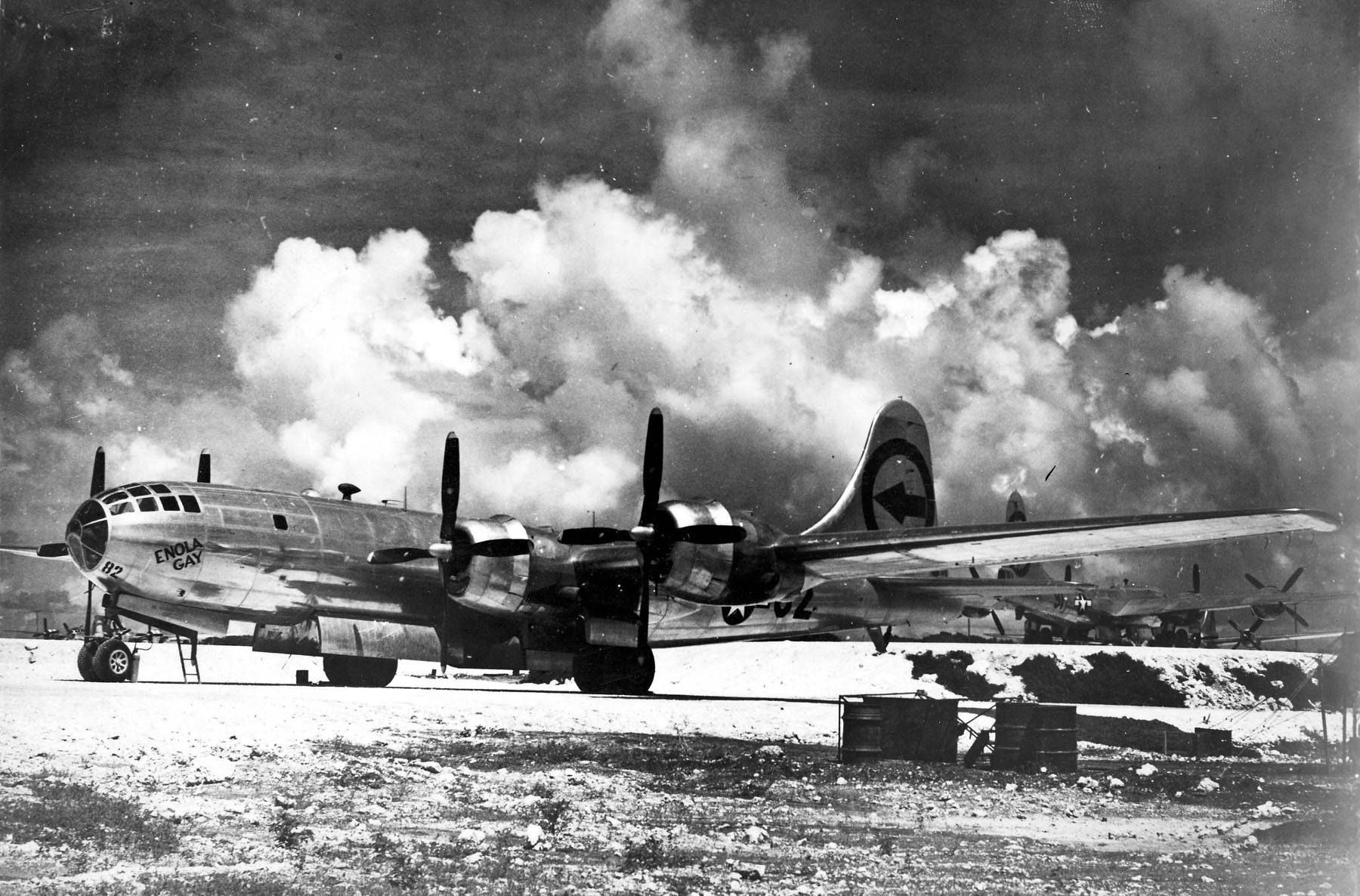
Enola Gay, a B-29 Superfortress, pictured in 1945

The song is named after the Enola Gay, the USAAF B-29 Superfortress bomber that carried Little Boy, the first atomic bomb to be used in an act of war, dropped on the Japanese city of Hiroshima on 6 August 1945, killing more than 100,000 of its citizens. The name of the bomber itself was chosen by its pilot, Colonel Paul Tibbets, who named it after his mother, Enola Gay Tibbets (1893–1983), who had been named after the heroine of the novel Enola; or, Her fatal mistake. (Note: Enola; or, Her Fatal Mistake (1886), by Mary Young Ridenbaugh is the only novel of the period to use "Enola".)

=== Lyric ===
The lyric to the song reflects on the decision to use the bomb and asks the listener to consider whether the bombings were necessary ("It shouldn't ever have to end this way"). The phrase "Is mother proud of Little Boy today?", is an allusion to both the nickname of the uranium bomb and pilot Paul Tibbets naming the aircraft after his mother. The phrase, "It's 8:15, and that's the time that it's always been", refers to the time of detonation over Hiroshima at 8:15 am JST; as many timepieces were "frozen" by the effects of the blast, it becomes "the time that it's always been". It is identified as an "anti-war" track, (Note: "Enola Gay" has been identified as an "anti-war" song by multiple outlets. It was also described as such in an official press statement regarding its 40th anniversary re-release.) although McCluskey stated he "wasn't really politically motivated to write the song", which was informed by a fascination with World War II bombers. He hoped it "conveyed an ambivalence about whether it was the right or the wrong thing to do".

== Critical reception ==
The song was met with largely positive reviews. Greg Reibman of Boston Rock wrote, "With 'Enola Gay', Orchestral Manoeuvres drop another devastating warhead on the world of inferior pop music... these guys are right on target." Canberra Times critic Jonathan Green described the track as "super", with "a lovely melody that makes for an utterly infectious song". Daniela Soave of Record Mirror called it "infinitely danceable, joyous and jumpy", while noting an uneasy juxtaposition between the musical content and sombre lyrics. NME said the track has "considerable plusses" including a "glorious melody", but expressed reservations about its commercial prospects, feeling it was destined for "chartless oblivion". The song was banned from being played on popular BBC1 children's programme Swap Shop, because it was thought to promote homosexuality.

The single was released at a time of strong anti-nuclear sentiment in Britain. This, according to the BBC, helped it become an "unlikely hit". The track entered the UK Singles Chart at number 59, but climbed 51 places over the next four weeks to reach a peak of number 8, becoming the group's first top 10 entry in their home country and one of the 50 best-selling singles in the UK in 1980. It was also a hit throughout continental Europe, topping the charts in Italy, Portugal and Spain.

In a retrospective assessment, AllMusic's Ned Raggett lauded the song as "astounding... a flat-out pop classic – clever, heartfelt, thrilling, and confident, not to mention catchy and arranged brilliantly". Critic Dave Thompson called it a "perfect synth-dance-pop extravaganza". John Bergstrom of PopMatters wrote, "'80s synthpop takes a lot of flack, much of it deserved. But 'Enola Gay' is a resounding refutation of the notion nothing substantial, beautiful, or timeless could ever come from skinny English guys with synths... Everything a classic should be."

== Legacy ==
Readers of NME, Record Mirror and Smash Hits voted "Enola Gay" one of the 10 best singles of 1980; it later placed eighth in a Slicing Up Eyeballs reader poll of the year's best songs. Gaffa ranked "Enola Gay" the third-greatest track of the 1980s, while Classic Pop named it 15th; the song has appeared in multiple recountings of the best records of the 1980s, and of all time. (Note: See:) It has also featured in lists such as MusicRadar's "40 Greatest Synth Tracks Ever", PopMatters' "100 Best Alternative Singles of the 1980s", and Smooth Radio's "25 Greatest 1980s Synthpop Songs". "Enola Gay" was selected by Danny Boyle for use during the opening ceremony of the 2012 Summer Olympics in London. The track became a Celtic F.C. anthem in the mid-to-late 2010s, with fans changing its lyrics to revolve around player Stuart Armstrong. It also became popular with Burnley F.C. supporters.

The BBC described "Enola Gay" as a "long-lasting hit"; the song's cumulative sales have exceeded 5 million copies. It has been described – along with 1986's "If You Leave" – as OMD's signature song. The track continues to be associated with LGBT culture; Rolling Stone critic Rob Sheffield wrote in 2020 that it is "about both coming out and nuclear destruction". Gigwise writer Josh Williams named "Enola Gay" as one of the most impactful songs to be featured in TV drama series It's a Sin (2021), which focuses on a group of gay men living during the HIV/AIDS crisis in the UK. Williams said, "It's clear to see why a young gay or bisexual male can place a different meaning on a lyric about dropping the nuclear bomb through coming out to their own families." OMD, aware of the track's perceived links to homosexuality, have embraced their large following within the LGBT community.

The song has been endorsed by other artists. In 1981, singer Bob Geldof and the duo Godley & Creme named "Enola Gay" one of their favourite singles of recent memory. Musicians Howard Jones and Toyah Willcox have listed "Enola Gay" among their favourite records of the 1980s, with the latter hailing it as "revolutionary". Jones included the "fantastic" track as the only cover version in his early live sets. "Enola Gay" has also been lauded by Al Doyle of Hot Chip, Rudi Esch of Die Krupps, physicist/musician Brian Cox, and solo artist Moby, who called it a "beautiful song" that he has "loved for decades". No Doubt bassist Tony Kanal noted that he and lead singer Gwen Stefani were heavily influenced by the track. "Enola Gay" has also impacted artists such as The Pains of Being Pure at Heart, Clive Gregson, and Jean-Benoît Dunckel of Air.

=== Home computer influence ===
"Enola Gay" is popular with early home computer enthusiasts, being used in demos such as Swinth (Commodore 64). Hackers have also enjoyed the song; it can be found as the "music bed" for numerous mega-demos and "cracktro" found on releases by warez groups like the Beastie Boys. The song was featured in the 2015 film Ex Machina, a sci-fi thriller about the implications of artificial intelligence.

16-bit computers brought with them the popular music tracker format where no fewer than a dozen versions exist.

== Music video ==
The music video was shot at the ITN studios in three hours one afternoon. It begins by showing sped-up footage of clouds passing through the sky. After the opening riff, which is shown as the keyboardist's hands playing whilst being animated using digital rotoscoping, it shows a transparent video image of McCluskey vocalising and playing bass guitar.

== B-side ==
The B-side on the UK release of "Enola Gay" was a track entitled "Annex". The song was not included on the ensuing Organisation album and remained unique to this release until being included in the 2001 compilation album Navigation: The OMD B-Sides and the 2003 remastered edition of Organisation. Although the track was basically an improvisation "made up on the spot", Paul Humphreys described it in a 1980 interview as "the best thing we've done all year"; AllMusic critic Aaron Badgley later called it a "brilliant" song.

== Track listing ==
=== 1980 original release ===
Side one
No.	Title	Length
1.	"Enola Gay"	3:33

Side two
No.	Title	Length
1.	"Annex"	4:33

The 12" single contained the same tracks as on the 7".

=== 2003 remix 12" ===
Side one
No.	Title	Length
1.	"Enola Gay" (Dancefloor Killa Remix)	9:02

Side two
No.	Title	Length
1.	"Enola Gay" (dub remix)	6:57
2.	"Enola Gay" (radio edit)	3:05

=== 2020 re-release 12" ===
Side one
No.	Title	Length
1.	"Enola Gay" (extended mix)	4:49

Side two
No.	Title	Length
1.	"Enola Gay" (slow mix)	4:05

== Charts ==
Weekly chart performance for "Enola Gay"
Chart (1980–1981)	Peak position
Australia (Kent Music Report)	47
France (IFOP)	6
Ireland (IRMA)	14
Italy (Musica e dischi)	2
Italy (RAI Hit Parade)	1
Italy (TV Sorrisi e Canzoni)	1
New Zealand (Recorded Music NZ)	31
Portugal (Música & Som)	1
Spain (AFE)	1
Switzerland (Schweizer Hitparade)	2
UK Singles (Official Charts)	8
US Hot Dance Club Play (Billboard)	34

Annual chart rankings for "Enola Gay"
Chart (1981)	Rank
Italy (Musica e dischi)	1

== Certifications and sales ==
Region	Certification	Certified units/sales
France	—	700,000
Italy (FIMI)	Gold	300,000
United Kingdom (BPI)	Platinum	600,000^{‡}
^{‡} Sales+streaming figures based on certification alone.

== Alternative versions ==
In 1998, David Guetta & Joachim Garraud and Sash! made remixed versions of the song for the intended second disc of The OMD Singles. The second disc was dropped, and eventually only the Sash! remix appeared on The OMD Remixes EPs. In 2003 the double disc version was released in France only, which included the remixed versions by Guetta and Garraud as well. Hot Chip remixed the song to coincide with its 40th anniversary re-release.

An early version of the song with a slightly different arrangement appears on the group's Peel Sessions 1979–1983 album. A live performance, recorded at the Guildhall in Portsmouth, England on 19 September 1980, is featured in the film Urgh! A Music War (1982).

== See also ==
- List of anti-war songs
- List of number-one hits of 1981 (Italy)
- List of number-one singles of 1981 (Spain)
