= Slicing Up Eyeballs =

International online pop culture magazine

- Website type: Music news
- Available in: English
- Editor: Matt Sebastian
- Website: slicingupeyeballs.com
- Launched: 2009; 17 years ago
- Current status: Active

Slicing Up Eyeballs is an American website dedicated to rock music, in particular 1980s college rock. Founded in 2009 by journalist and music critic Matt Sebastian, the site publishes content including news, interviews, and polls. It has been identified as one of the Internet's most reliable resources for 1980s rock music.

== Background ==
Slicing Up Eyeballs was founded in 2009 by Denver-based writer Matt Sebastian. A graduate of the University of Colorado, Sebastian had a 20-year career at the Daily Camera, where he worked as a music critic and entertainment editor. He also wrote for various newspapers in Utah and the San Francisco Bay Area, and in 2018 joined The Denver Post as an editor. Sebastian has alternately served as a radio presenter, hosting a Sunday night dark wave show for SiriusXM, as well as a Tuesday night show on Strangeways Radio. He penned a guest column for USA Today in 2012, stating, "Slicing Up Eyeballs... is devoted to the genre that first turned me into a lifelong music geek: '80s college rock, a.k.a. modern rock, a.k.a. alternative rock, a.k.a. indie rock." The site takes its name from a lyric in the 1989 Pixies song "Debaser".

== Content ==
The site provides music news, user polls, and interviews with musicians; Erasure singer Andy Bell's official site, in sharing his 2010 interview with Slicing Up Eyeballs, described the page as "brilliantly named". Exclaim! referred to the site as "one of the internet's most dependable resources for '80s rock", while Westword said it "has established itself as one of the best sources around, maybe in the world, for news about '80s college, modern and indie rock". Slicing Up Eyeballs articles have formed the basis of, or have been used as a reference in, pieces by mainstream outlets including the Irish Independent, Clash, Uncut, Spin, Pitchfork, Rolling Stone, NME, Billboard, and BBC America, who noted that a 2012 Slicing Up Eyeballs report about a potential new Kate Bush track caused a "hot fuss". Artists such as Peter Hook, the Alarm and Deathline International have announced or premiered new material through the site, while Martini Ranch's Andrew Rosenthal publicly addressed the death of bandmate Bill Paxton via the page.

In May 2015, Sebastian announced that he would no longer be updating the site, but would maintain the Slicing Up Eyeballs presence on social media. Its retirement was lamented by Newsweek, who featured Slicing Up Eyeballs in an article on "good pop culture sites" that ceased operations in 2015. Sebastian revived the site in February 2017.
