= Paul Humphreys =

English singer, songwriter and musician

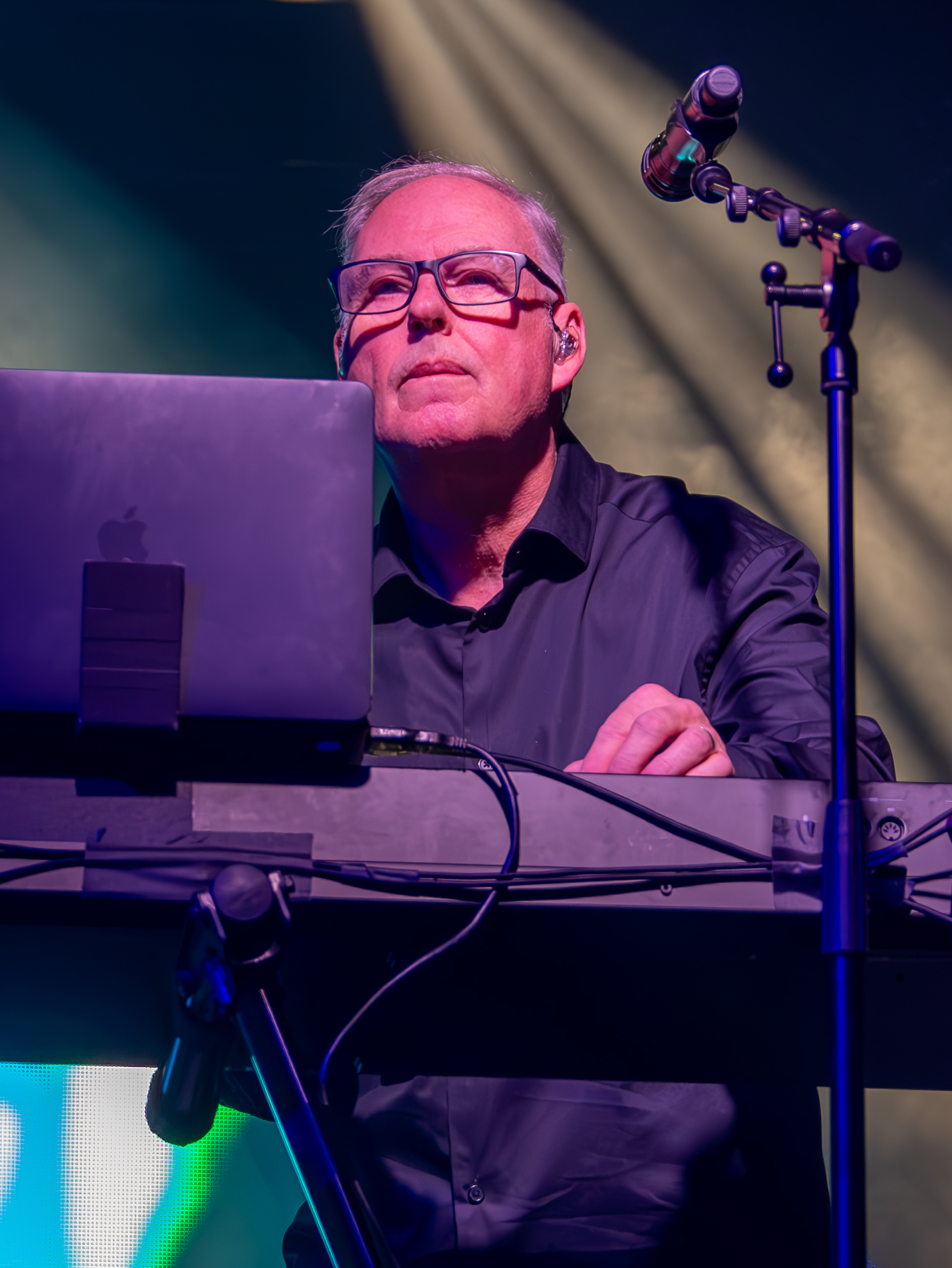
- Humphreys performing with Orchestral Manoeuvres in the Dark (OMD) in 2024

Background information
- Born: Paul David Humphreys; 27 February 1960 (age 66); London, England
- Origin: Wirral Peninsula, England
- Genres: New wave; synth-pop; electronic; post-punk; experimental
- Occupations: Singer; songwriter; musician
- Instruments: Vocals; synthesizers; keyboards
- Years active: 1978–present
- Labels: Dindisc; Virgin; Telegraph; There(There)
- Member of: Orchestral Manoeuvres in the Dark
- Formerly of: The Listening Pool; Onetwo; The Id

Paul David Humphreys (born 27 February 1960) is an English singer, songwriter and musician. He is best known as the keyboardist and secondary vocalist of the electronic band Orchestral Manoeuvres in the Dark (OMD), which he founded alongside lead vocalist and bassist Andy McCluskey in 1978. The Quietus remarked, "If, roughly speaking, McCluskey is the intellect and inquisitive nature in the group, then Humphreys is the heart." The pair have been recognised as pioneers of electronic music.

Humphreys played with OMD until 1989, seven years before the band's dissolution, and returned for their 2006 reformation. His songwriting contribution features on all of the group's studio albums, save for 1991's Sugar Tax. Humphreys sang lead vocals on several OMD tracks, including the singles "Electricity", "Souvenir", "Never Turn Away", "Secret", "(Forever) Live and Die" and "What Have We Done".

Aside from his work with OMD, Humphreys fronted spin-off band the Listening Pool from 1989 to 1996, and recorded with former Propaganda singer Claudia Brücken as the duo Onetwo from 2000 to 2013.

== Career ==
=== OMD ===
Humphreys was born on 27 February 1960 in London, and grew up in a working-class home on the Wirral Peninsula, near Liverpool. He was two years old when his father died; this required his mother to work three jobs at once. During his youth, Humphreys developed an interest in German electronic music by bands such as Kraftwerk, Neu!, Can and La Düsseldorf. He was also influenced by the work of Brian Eno and early ambient styles of music. Humphreys joined a variety of bands in the mid-1970s but this was mostly defined by progressive rock and it was not until he met Andy McCluskey that they began their own musical experiments which culminated in a one-off gig as Orchestral Manoeuvres in the Dark at Eric's Club in Liverpool.

OMD became one of the leading bands in the synth-pop movement, though they developed largely independently of others such as the Human League. The group enjoyed considerable commercial success internationally during the 1980s, with Humphreys and McCluskey being recognised as pioneers of electronic music. John Doran of The Quietus remarked, "If, roughly speaking, McCluskey is the intellect and inquisitive nature in [OMD], then Humphreys is the heart." The pair's songwriting partnership has been dubbed the "Lennon–McCartney of synth-pop".

Although McCluskey was the lead singer for OMD, Humphreys did sing on several singles during the 1980s, and provided lead or prominent vocals on the album tracks "Promise", "Georgia" and "ABC Auto Industry", as well as on the B-sides "4-Neu" and "Gravity Never Failed". The Dodos frontman Meric Long said of his personal singing style, "I'd attribute it to Paul Humphreys from OMD, he's probably the first guy I heard doing weird echoey vocal stuff." Humphreys was a more reserved individual than McCluskey; of their partnership, the latter said, "We always had this joke that two Pauls wouldn't get anything done and two Andys would kill each other". Humphreys left OMD in 1989, but was credited as co-writer of 1993 single "Everyday" and two tracks from Universal (1996): "Very Close to Far Away" and "If You're Still in Love with Me". Sugar Tax (1991) is the only album in the OMD catalogue not to feature the songwriting contribution of Humphreys.

==== Reformation ====
In 2005, McCluskey and Humphreys reunited OMD for a gig on German TV. They decided to reform OMD which McCluskey had continued with from 1989 until winding up the band in 1996 disillusioned by the prevalence of Britpop. 2007 finally saw the return of OMD in their classic line-up on stage and they have toured extensively since having received an enthusiastic and warm welcome. 2010 saw the release of Humphreys' first studio album with OMD for 24 years, titled History of Modern. Next studio album English Electric (2013) featured a lead vocal from Humphreys on the track "Stay with Me". Humphreys also sang lead on the single "What Have We Done", taken from the studio album The Punishment of Luxury (2017).

=== Other projects ===
Humphreys continued to write and record with Holmes and Cooper under the name the Listening Pool. This project met with little commercial success, though a studio album, Still Life (1994), was released. The sound was less directly electronic than even later OMD and is in marked contrast to the later sound of Onetwo and the reformed OMD.

By the late 1990s, Humphreys was performing OMD setlists once more. "Paul Humphreys from OMD", in which Humphreys performed McCluskey-sung material as well as his own songs, was still active as of 2001.

In 1996, Humphreys began a songwriting collaboration with German musician Claudia Brücken, who was formerly lead vocalist of the band Propaganda. They recorded and performed live under the name Onetwo from 2004 (the duo was nameless when they began performing in 2000) until their separation in March 2013.

== Instruments ==
Humphreys' main instruments are electronic keyboards. With OMD, he made use of a wide range of these including the Korg M-500 Micro Preset monophonic analog synthesizer, polyphonic analogue synthesizers such as the Sequential Circuits Prophet-5 and the Korg Trident, the electromechanical tape-sampling instrument known as the Mellotron, electronic organs such as the Vox Jaguar, and digital sampling keyboards such as the E-mu Emulator and Fairlight CMI. Due to the restrictive nature of the equipment available to Humphreys and McCluskey they resorted to invention and innovation, which often defined their early sound. On the track "Souvenir" (1981) Humphreys used recordings of a choir tuning up to create the ethereal and fluttery choral effects which gave the song its original sound.

More recently he predominantly uses Pro Tools software and a series of soft synths for recording and writing, and a Roland Fantom keyboard for live work, largely using it as a sampling keyboard to faithfully reproduce the original sounds. When recreating the original OMD sounds of the 1980s he had to resort to buying synthesisers off eBay.

Humphreys is a self-taught musician and in the first years of OMD he built his own electronic sound making equipment. The group's first synthesiser, the Korg M-500 Micro Preset was purchased through a catalogue belonging to Andy McCluskey's mother.

== Personal life ==
Humphreys was married to Maureen Udin. He later had a relationship with Claudia Brücken, with whom he performed in Onetwo; the pair lived together in London.

In 2018, Humphreys married Lithuanian marketer Rūta Degutytė. The couple have two children together, Lily (b.2021) and Lucas (b.2025).
