= Andy McCluskey =

British singer, songwriter and bass guitarist

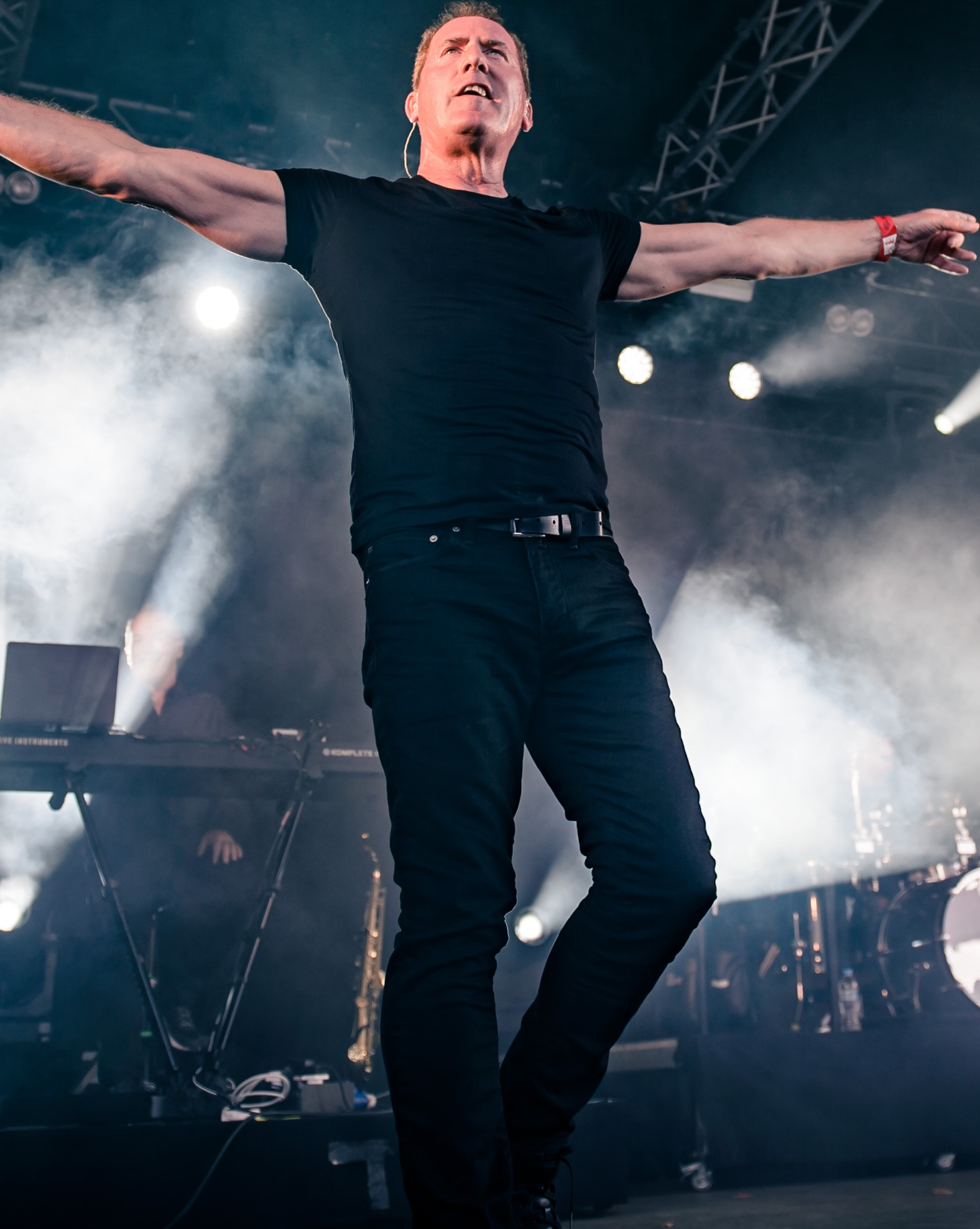
- McCluskey performing live with Orchestral Manoeuvres in the Dark (OMD) in Cologne, Germany, 2018

Background information
- Born: George Andrew McCluskey; 24 June 1959 (age 67); Heswall, Wirral, England
- Origin: Meols, Wirral, England
- Genres: Electronic; synth-pop; experimental; new wave
- Occupations: Musician; singer; songwriter; record producer
- Instruments: Vocals; bass guitar; guitar; keyboards
- Years active: 1976–present
- Member of: Orchestral Manoeuvres in the Dark
- Formerly of: VCL XI; Equinox; Pegasus; The Id; Dalek I Love You
- Website: omd.uk.com

George Andrew McCluskey (born 24 June 1959) is an English singer, songwriter, musician and record producer. He is best known as the lead vocalist and bassist of the electronic band Orchestral Manoeuvres in the Dark (OMD), which he founded alongside keyboardist Paul Humphreys in 1978: McCluskey has been the group's sole constant member. He has sold over 40 million records with OMD, and is regarded as a pioneer of electronic music in the UK. McCluskey is noted for his frenetic onstage "Trainee Teacher Dance".

McCluskey also founded the pop girl group Atomic Kitten, for whom he served as a principal songwriter and record producer, and has collaborated with various acts. His work has received nominations at the Ivor Novello, Grammy and Brit Awards, and has topped charts in the UK and internationally.

== Early life and career ==
McCluskey was born on 24 June 1959 in Heswall, Wirral, and grew up in a working-class home in Meols, on the northern coast of the Wirral. McCluskey's father, James, was born in Glasgow and was a railway worker. He later worked at Stanlow Oil Refinery, which enabled OMD to record the industrial sounds featured on "Stanlow" (1980). McCluskey's mother was a hairdresser and lollipop lady.

McCluskey met Paul Humphreys at Great Meols Primary School, on Elwyn Road, and played with him in several bands, including Hitlerz Underpantz, VCL XI and the Id. McCluskey then attended Calday Grange Grammar School in West Kirby. He briefly joined Dalek I Love You as their lead vocalist, but left because he wanted to sing his own songs. McCluskey teamed up with Humphreys again to form OMD in 1978, achieving global success. Humphreys and the rest of the band broke-up with McCluskey in 1989, with McCluskey retaining the OMD name: he disbanded the group in 1996. McCluskey has sold over 40 million records with OMD, and is regarded as a pioneer of electronic music in the UK.

McCluskey composed a number of OMD singles, including: "Enola Gay", which became an international chart-topper; "Joan of Arc"; "Maid of Orleans", which was Germany's biggest-selling single of 1982; and "Pandora's Box". He also co-wrote hits such as "Messages", "Locomotion", "Talking Loud and Clear", "If You Leave", "Sailing on the Seven Seas" and "Walking on the Milky Way". Music Week said that McCluskey has an "immense talent for writing perfect pop songs", while Q's Debbi Voller called him a "master of melody". In 1993, Mark Frith of Smash Hits described McCluskey as "something of a living legend". His songwriting partnership with Humphreys has been dubbed the "Lennon–McCartney of synth-pop".

McCluskey has gained the admiration of fellow musicians including Paul McCartney, John Robb, the Teardrop Explodes's David Balfe, the Time Frequency's Jon Campbell, and Kraftwerk's Karl Bartos, who hailed him as "such an excellent songwriter". Joy Division and New Order co-founder Peter Hook viewed McCluskey as "really underrated... for what he did with Orchestral Manoeuvres but also those pop songs he wrote for Atomic Kitten." Vince Clarke (co-founder of Depeche Mode, Yazoo and Erasure) described McCluskey's as a "really good voice" and noted OMD as a "huge influence". The Human League and Heaven 17 co-founder, Martyn Ware, referred to "the great Andy McCluskey", labelling him a "true pioneer of electronic pop music".

=== OMD reformation ===
McCluskey and Humphreys reunited for a performance on German TV in June 2005, officially reforming OMD in 2006. 2007 saw the first tour of the reformed band, including Martin Cooper and Malcolm Holmes, commemorating the twenty-sixth anniversary of the release of their seminal studio album Architecture & Morality (1981).

The band released a CD and DVD of their Hammersmith Apollo (London) live gig from the 2007 reunion tour in the spring of 2008, before undertaking a European tour to celebrate thirty years as a band in the autumn of 2008. A compilation of their singles and videos, Messages: Greatest Hits, was released that year. On 20 September 2010 OMD released their eleventh studio album History of Modern, their first in 14 years. The band's Souvenir box set, a career retrospective covering their entire oeuvre, was nominated for "Best Historical Album" at the 2021 Grammy Awards.

=== Live performance ===
McCluskey noted how, in the early days of OMD, the band's work was perceived as "robotic intellectual music that you couldn't dance to". In response, he developed an onstage dancing style that has been described as "manic" and "jerky". While some journalists – and McCluskey himself – have been critical of his dancing ability, the routine found popularity with OMD fans as well as with teaching students, thus earning the name, the "Trainee Teacher Dance" (coined by broadcaster Stuart Maconie). The Scotsman hailed McCluskey's dancing as "legendary", while The Times said that he "deserves credit for making it an integral part of the OMD brand... You can fault his skill, but not his tireless enthusiasm."

American rock band ZZ Top were noted admirers of McCluskey's dancing, incorporating elements of the routine into their own live show. Electronic musician Martyn Ware remarked that "his stage performances are exceptional". No Doubt bassist and OMD fan, Tony Kanal, said in 2012, "McCluskey is the singer and he also plays bass, which is [an] incredibly difficult way to multi-task. I finally saw them live last year and his playing and singing are so incredible." Kevin Hearn of Barenaked Ladies called McCluskey a "great frontman" and an inspiration.

In live performances, McCluskey often plays bass guitar and occasionally, keyboard instruments and guitar. He is right-handed, but originally learned to play bass guitar on a left-handed model. As a result, he plays with the strings "upside down" (i.e., with the lowest-pitched string on the bottom and the highest-pitched one on top), counter to normal practice.

== Atomic Kitten and the Genie Queen ==
In 1998, McCluskey founded the English pop group Atomic Kitten, serving as songwriter and producer. Their 2001 single "Whole Again", co-written by McCluskey, was his first no. 1 song on the UK singles chart, and he and his fellow songwriters were nominated for the Ivor Novello Award for "International hit of the year". The song also received a Brit Award nomination for "Best British Single". McCluskey was also a writer of the Atomic Kitten hits "Right Now", "See Ya", "I Want Your Love" and "Cradle". He parted ways with the group during the recording of their second studio album, Feels So Good (2002).

McCluskey subsequently formed the White Noise record and publishing label where he worked with Liverpool girl group, the Genie Queen.

== Other work ==
McCluskey has written with, and provided session musicianship for, various artists. Some of his collaborators include: Gary Barlow of Take That, with whom McCluskey wrote the song "Thrill Me" for the soundtrack of the film Eddie the Eagle (2015); The Lightning Seeds, for whom he played keyboards on their debut studio album Cloudcuckooland (1990); and Karl Bartos, whose record Esperanto (1993) – released under the Elektric Music moniker – features McCluskey as co-writer on "Show Business" and "Kissing the Machine" (and as lead vocalist on the latter track). Bartos also co-wrote the song "The Moon & the Sun", which featured on OMD's tenth studio album Universal (1996). "Kissing the Machine" would later appear in a reworked form on OMD's twelfth studio album English Electric (2013). McCluskey recorded the song "A Million Stars" with members of the American pop rock band Fun, for the soundtrack of the film The D Train (2015).

McCluskey owns The Motor Museum, a recording studio in Liverpool. Northern Irish record producer Mike Crossey, who worked at the studio, has credited McCluskey with being a "great mentor".

== Personal life ==
McCluskey's girlfriend in the late 1970s was the Id bandmate Julia Kneale. She wrote the lyrics to "Julia's Song", which appeared on OMD's eponymous debut studio album in 1980.

He lived in Dublin, Ireland in the 1990s.

McCluskey later married Toni, with whom he had two children. A prominent reason for OMD's reformation was that his children had never seen him on stage; in 2007 he said: "I was happy to stop working to be with the kids, but strangely enough they have been the most vocal in encouraging me back." The couple divorced in 2011 and Toni returned to her native San Diego, California, with the children.

McCluskey is a supporter of Liverpool F.C. He also acquired a fandom of Celtic F.C. through his Glaswegian father.

McCluskey is a longtime atheist.
