= Brides of Frankenstein =

Single by Orchestral Manoeuvres in the Dark
- Released: November 1988
- Genre: House
- Length: 7:14
- Label: A&M; Virgin
- Songwriter: Orchestral Manoeuvres in the Dark
- Producers: Mike "Hitman" Wilson; Steve "Silk" Hurley

Orchestral Manoeuvres in the Dark singles chronology
"Dreaming" (1988)	"Brides of Frankenstein" (1988)	"Sailing on the Seven Seas" (1991)

Audio video
- "Brides of Frankenstein (US Release Megamix)" on YouTube

"Brides of Frankenstein" is a medley of excerpts from various Orchestral Manoeuvres in the Dark (OMD) songs mixed with dance rhythms by Mike "Hitman" Wilson and Steve "Silk" Hurley.

It was released as a 12-inch single in November 1988 in the United States and Canada. In 1991, both tracks were released as B-sides of the "Call My Name" CD single.

== Track listing ==
All songs written by OMD.

=== 12" single: A&M SP-12285 (US) / Virgin VSX 1461 (Canada) ===
==== A-side ====
1. "Brides of Frankenstein" (Mix) – 7:14

==== B-side ====
1. "Brides of Frankenstein" (Dub) – 6:18

== Songs used in the mix ==
- "Locomotion"
- "Messages"
- "Secret"
- "So in Love"
- "If You Leave"
- "We Love You"

== Charts ==
Chart (1989)	Peak position
US Dance Club Songs (Billboard)	7
US Dance Singles Sales (Billboard)	16
