= Sugar Tax (album) =

Studio album by Orchestral Manoeuvres in the Dark
- Released: 7 May 1991
- Recorded: 1989–1990
- Studios: The Pink Museum, Liverpool; The Strongroom, London; The Town House, London; Amazon, Liverpool
- Genres: Dance-pop; synth-pop
- Length: 51:17
- Label: Virgin
- Producers: Orchestral Manoeuvres in the Dark; Howard Gray; Andy Richards

Orchestral Manoeuvres in the Dark chronology
The Best of OMD (1988)	Sugar Tax (1991)	Liberator (1993)

Singles from Sugar Tax
- 1. "Sailing on the Seven Seas" Released: 18 March 1991; 2. "Pandora's Box" Released: 24 June 1991; 3. "Then You Turn Away" Released: 2 September 1991; 4. "Call My Name" Released: 18 November 1991

Sugar Tax is the eighth studio album by the English electronic band Orchestral Manoeuvres in the Dark (OMD), released on 7 May 1991 by Virgin Records. It was the group's first studio album since 1986's The Pacific Age, and the first of three recorded without co-founder Paul Humphreys, who had departed in 1989. Featuring singer Andy McCluskey alongside a new line-up of musicians, Sugar Tax leans towards the then-prevalent dance-pop genre, with McCluskey's songwriting at times being influenced by the breakdown of his relationship with Humphreys.

Sugar Tax has provoked mixed responses from critics since its release, being described as both the equal of OMD's seminal Architecture & Morality (1981), and a "forgettable" entry in the group's catalogue. It nevertheless became one of the band's biggest commercial successes, peaking at number three on the UK Albums Chart and selling three million copies by 2007. The record spawned four singles, including the UK top-10 hits "Sailing on the Seven Seas" and "Pandora's Box".

Sugar Tax is the only OMD album on which Paul Humphreys does not receive a songwriting credit.

== Background ==
In the aftermath of the band's 1989 split, Virgin Records gave the OMD moniker to singer Andy McCluskey, while departing members Paul Humphreys, Martin Cooper and Malcolm Holmes named their new ensemble The Listening Pool.

McCluskey dealt with anxiety about continuing as OMD, stating, "My name doesn't appear anywhere on the album. I was trying to hide behind the corporate identity of OMD because I was terrified that I was on my own because all I'd ever known was working with Paul and then Paul, Malcolm and Martin." His fears were assuaged somewhat by collaborating with new group members Nigel Ipinson and Phil Coxon. Stuart Kershaw, who would join the band as an instrumentalist in later years, co-wrote five tracks.

Recording took place at various studios in Liverpool and London. Andy Richards was enlisted as a producer but McCluskey elected to self-produce much of the record with assistance from Coxon and Jeremy Allom in engineering roles. The album is characterised by its extensive use of the Korg M1 workstation.

"Was It Something I Said" and "All That Glitters" were directly inspired by OMD's lineup split in 1989, while "Big Town" deals with coming of age in the music industry. "Pandora's Box" was inspired by silent movie actress Louise Brooks, and shares its title with the film Pandora's Box (1929), which stars Brooks in the lead role. "Neon Lights" is a cover of a Kraftwerk song, originally featured on The Man-Machine (1978). "Apollo XI" uses samples from Apollo space missions; a club mix was pressed on white label 12". "Walk Tall" utilises a choral sample from "Miserere" by Gregorio Allegri, and was originally titled "Coming to See You".

The record title Sugar Tax refers to the notion of everything sweet having a price, including relationships. The actual "Sugar Tax" track was not completed in time for the album's release, and was instead included as a B-side to "Then You Turn Away". The artwork was designed by Area with photography by Trevor Key, and features an oil sculpture.

== Reception ==
Professional ratings
Review scores
Source	Rating
All Music Guide to Electronica	3/5 stars
The Boston Phoenix	2.5/4 stars
Entertainment Weekly	B
Hi-Fi News & Record Review	A:1/2
Ondarock	7/10
Q	3/5 stars
South Wales Echo	3.5/5 stars
St. Petersburg Times	4/5 stars
Today	8/10
Yorkshire Evening Press	4/4

Sugar Tax met with mixed reviews. Richard Riccio of the St. Petersburg Times wrote, "Sugar Tax is classic OMD, and after a four-year absence marks a triumphant return... McCluskey has managed to distill all the best qualities of a 12-year career into a highly listenable album." In Factsheet Five, Bill Carbonelli called the record "British pop at its finest. Loaded down with well-rounded synths and expressive vocals." Paul Davies of Q referred to "an unflappable album of quality songs which re-establishes OMD's credentials as masters of synthesized melancholia and dreamy pop." RPM selected Sugar Tax as their "album pick" for the week of 15 June; on 12 July, CMJ reporters named it one of the 10 best recent albums.

Other writers were less enthusiastic. NME's Andrew Collins portrayed Sugar Tax as a "deft exercise in short-range synthesiser pop that, for the most part, flutters along on a criminally simplistic vibe with all but a low-rent beatbox and a well-depressed instant choir button to perk it up." Evelyn Erskine of the Ottawa Citizen stated, "Occasionally OMD manages to find the hypnotic pulse that once made the band tick. But it never really traces it to the dark soul that once set it apart." Vox journalist Steve Malins praised the record's candour and "smooth production", but felt its content "lacks any lasting impact". James Muretich of the Calgary Herald dismissed the album as "forgettable... sugary, taxing pop that goes poof in the night".

The Morning Call's Len Righi later argued that Sugar Tax had been "underappreciated", and applauded McCluskey's "superb job" on the record. Mark Lindores of Classic Pop wrote, "McCluskey's ear for killer melodies was as sharp as ever... Sugar Tax was the strongest OMD album in years and houses its fair share of career highlights." In Q, Debbi Voller saw the record as a "return to form" that "matched the achievement" of 1981's Architecture & Morality (often regarded as OMD's seminal work). Stephen Thomas Erlewine, editor of the All Music Guide to Electronica (2001), was less impressed, stating that "Sugar Tax, while thoroughly competent, is nothing more than predictably refined and pleasant dance-pop."

Sugar Tax became one of OMD's most popular albums, achieving sales of three million copies by 2007. Jon Campbell of The Time Frequency professed to "love" the record, while Charlatans frontman Tim Burgess staged a Twitter listening party of the album, stating that he had forgotten "quite how brilliant" it is.

== Track listing ==
All tracks are written by OMD (i.e. Andy McCluskey), except where noted.

No.	Title	Writer(s)	Length
1.	"Sailing on the Seven Seas"	OMD, Stuart Kershaw	3:45
2.	"Pandora's Box"		4:09
3.	"Then You Turn Away"	OMD, Kershaw, Lloyd Massett	4:17
4.	"Speed of Light"		4:29
5.	"Was It Something I Said"		4:29
6.	"Big Town"		4:19
7.	"Call My Name"		4:23
8.	"Apollo XI" (instrumental, contains sample from JFK "Landing a man on the moon" speech and Apollo 11-related radio transmissions)		4:13
9.	"Walking on Air"	OMD, Kershaw, Massett	4:49
10.	"Walk Tall"	OMD, Kershaw, Massett	3:55
11.	"Neon Lights" (reworking of Kraftwerk track from The Man-Machine)	Ralf Hütter, Florian Schneider, Karl Bartos	4:19
12.	"All That Glitters"	OMD, Kershaw, Massett	4:06

== Personnel ==
OMD:

- Andy McCluskey – lead vocals, bass guitar, keyboards
- Nigel Ipinson – keyboards
- Phil Coxon – keyboards, engineering, demos
- Stuart Kershaw - drums

Other musicians:

- Stuart Boyle – guitar
- Carmen Daye, Doreen Edwards, Sue Forshaw, Ann Heston, Nathalie Loates, Christine Mellor (appears courtesy of Fever Urbain Records), Beverly Reppion – additional vocals

== Production ==
- Recorded and performed by: Orchestral Manoeuvres in the Dark for and on behalf of Blue Noise Ltd., except "Neon Lights" by OMD and Christine Mellor.
- Published by: Virgin Music (Publishers) Ltd., except "Neon Lights" by EMI Music Publishers Ltd.
- Produced by: Orchestral Manoeuvres in the Dark, except Howard Gray (4), Andy Richards (7, 9, 12)
- Mixed by: Jeremy Allom, Avril Mackintosh, Alan Meyerson, Steve Williams
- Engineered by: Jeremy Allom, Phil Coxon, Fred De Faye, Guy Forrester, Mike Haas, Renny Hill, Pat O'Shaughnessy, Steve Williams.
- Recorded at: The Pink Museum, Liverpool; The Strongroom, London; The Townhouse, London; Amazon Studios, Liverpool.
- Mixed at: The Roundhouse, London; The Townhouse, London; Larrabee Sounds, Los Angeles; Mayfair Studios, London.
- Management: Steve Jensen and Martin Kirkup for Direct Management Group, Los Angeles
- Sleeve designed by: Area
- Photography by: Trevor Key
- Portrait by: David Sheinman

== Equipment ==
Recording:

- Akai S1000 sampler + hard drive
- Alesis HR16 drum machine
- Atari 1040ST computer
- Casio CZ 230s synth
- E-mu Proteus sample reader
- Korg M1 workstation
- Oberheim Matrix 1000 synth module
- Roland D110 synth module
- Roland Super JX synth module
- Steinberg Pro24 v3 sequencing software
- Yamaha RX-5 drum machine
- Yamaha TX81Z synth module

Live:

- Akai S1000 (8MEG) sampler (x2)
- Cheetah Midi controller keyboard
- Korg M1R synth module (x2)
- Roland A80 MIDI controller keyboard
- Roland D-550
- Roland piano module

== Charts ==
=== Weekly charts ===
Weekly chart performance for Sugar Tax
Chart (1991–1992)	Peak position
Australian Albums (ARIA)	96
Austrian Albums (Ö3 Austria)	5
Canada Top Albums/CDs (RPM)	76
European Albums (Music & Media)	10
German Albums (Offizielle Top 100)	8
Hungarian Albums (MAHASZ)	19
Swedish Albums (Sverigetopplistan)	7
Swiss Albums (Schweizer Hitparade)	14
UK Albums (Official Charts)	3

=== Year-end charts ===
Year-end chart performance for Sugar Tax
Chart (1991)	Position
European Albums (Music & Media)	32
German Albums (Offizielle Top 100)	21
UK Albums (OCC)	44

== Certifications ==
Certifications for Sugar Tax
Region	Certification	Certified units/sales
Austria (IFPI Austria)	Gold	25,000^{*}
Germany (BVMI)	Platinum	500,000^{^}
Sweden (GLF)	Gold	50,000^{^}
United Kingdom (BPI)	Platinum	300,000^{^}
^{*} Sales figures based on certification alone.^{^} Shipments figures based on certification alone.
