= Shame (Orchestral Manoeuvres in the Dark song) =

- cover of the CD single

Single by Orchestral Manoeuvres in the Dark

from the album The Pacific Age
- B-side: "Goddess of Love"; "(Forever) Live and Die"; "Messages"
- Released: 13 April 1987
- Recorded: London
- Genre: Synth-pop; new wave
- Length: 4:15 (album version); 3:49 (re-recorded version); 6:59 (extended re-recorded version)
- Label: Virgin
- Songwriters: Paul Humphreys; Andy McCluskey; Graham Weir; Neil Weir
- Producer: Rhett Davies

Orchestral Manoeuvres in the Dark singles chronology
"We Love You" (1986)	"Shame" (1987)	"Dreaming" (1988)

Music video
- "Shame" on YouTube

"Shame" is a song by the English electronic band Orchestral Manoeuvres in the Dark (OMD), released as the third single taken from their 1986 album, The Pacific Age, although it is a re-recording made after the album's release, presumably in early 1987, and was produced by Rhett Davies (as opposed to the original album version which was produced by Stephen Hague).

== Release history ==
"Shame" was scheduled for release as a single whilst OMD were still on tour. The band had suggested "Stay" as a possible single from the album, but label Virgin thought "Shame" had more potential. The band relented, although feeling the album version was too slow, and recruited Rhett Davies to give the song more of a polish.

This single marked OMD's first CD single release, available two weeks after the 7-inch and 12-inch single formats on 27 April 1986. It was issued in a gatefold sleeve featuring a sepia-toned photo of the band on the gatefold along with track details. This release also included their 1980 hit "Messages", released here in digital format for the first time.

The B-side "Goddess of Love" was lifted straight from the album The Pacific Age and was the song which was originally intended to be used for the Pretty in Pink movie soundtrack before the group came up with "If You Leave", which was featured in the movie.

The single reached no. 52 on the UK Singles Chart. It was not included on any of OMD's singles compilation albums, until its inclusion on the definitive Souvenir, fortieth anniversary singles compilation in 2019.

A promotional video was made for the single and is included on the DVD of the CD/DVD release Messages: Greatest Hits.

== Track listings ==
=== 7" vinyl ===
- UK: Virgin / VS 938
- Germany: Virgin / 109 000

Side one
No.	Title	Length
1.	"Shame" (re-recorded version)	3:49

Side two
No.	Title	Length
1.	"Goddess of Love"	4:28

=== 12" vinyl ===
- UK: Virgin / VS 938-12
- UK: Virgin / VS 938-12 DJ (promo)
- Germany: Virgin / 609 000

Side one
No.	Title	Length
1.	"Shame" (extended re-recorded version)	6:59

Side two
No.	Title	Length
1.	"Shame" (7" version)	3:49
2.	"Goddess of Love"	4:28

- Canada: Virgin / VSX 1371

Side one
No.	Title	Length
1.	"Shame" (extended re-recorded version)	6:59

Side two
No.	Title	Length
1.	"Shame" (re-recorded version)	3:49
2.	"Shame"	4:09

=== CD single ===
- UK: Virgin / MIKE938 12

No.	Title	Length
1.	"Shame" (extended re-recorded version)	6:59
2.	"Goddess of Love"	4:28
3.	"(Forever) Live and Die" (12" mix)	5:57
4.	"Messages" (10" remix)	4:41

== Chart performance ==
Chart (1986)	Peak position
UK Singles Chart	52
