= Dream of Me (Orchestral Manoeuvres in the Dark song) =

1993 single by Orchestral Manoeuvres in the Dark

"Dream of Me (Based on Love's Theme)"

Single by Orchestral Manoeuvres in the Dark

from the album Liberator
- B-side: "Strange Sensations"; "The Place You Fear the Most"
- Released: 5 July 1993
- Studio: Pink Museum, The Ministry (Liverpool)
- Length: 4:13 (album version); 4:16 (7-inch remix)
- Label: Virgin
- Songwriters: Barry White; Andy McCluskey
- Producers: Andy McCluskey; Phil Coxon

Orchestral Manoeuvres in the Dark singles chronology
"Stand Above Me" (1993)	"Dream of Me (Based on Love's Theme)" (1993)	"Everyday" (1993)

Music video
- "Dream of Me (Based on Love's Theme)" on YouTube

"Dream of Me (Based on Love's Theme)" is a song by the English electronic band Orchestral Manoeuvres in the Dark (OMD), released in July 1993 by Virgin Records as the second single from their ninth studio album, Liberator (1993). The song uses a sample from "Love's Theme", a 1973 instrumental piece recorded by Barry White's Love Unlimited Orchestra. It was remixed by Gregg Jackman for release as a single and reached the top 30 in Belgium, the Netherlands, and the United Kingdom.

== Critical reception ==
Upon its release, Gina Morris of NME described "Dream of Me" as "a simple song in three parts; an upfront drum machine, 'spooky' echoed vocals and sick sentiment". She added that one of the CD single's additional tracks, a live version of "Enola Gay", serves "to remind us why [OMD] exist at all. Just." Larry Flick, writing for the US magazine Billboard, praised it as "a sparkling pop bauble that will have you twirling back in time to your favorite disco memories". He noted that the "tune itself is pretty and engaging" and felt it is "well-served by Andy McCluskey's warmly familiar voice".

== Music video ==
The music video for "Dream of Me" was directed by Pedro Romhanyi and produced by Steve Elliott for Oil Factory. It was released on 12 July 1993 and features clever post production in a cast of thousands style a la Busby Berkeley.

== Track listings ==
- 7-inch and cassette single
1. "Dream of Me (Based on Love's Theme)" (7-inch remix)
2. "Strange Sensations"
- UK CD1 and Australasian CD single
1. "Dream of Me (Based on Love's Theme)"
2. "Strange Sensations"
3. "The Place You Fear the Most"
4. "Dream of Me (Based on Love's Theme)" (Pianoforte Cruiser mix)
- UK CD2
1. "Dream of Me (Based on Love's Theme)"
2. "Enola Gay" (live)
3. "Dreaming" (live)
4. "Call My Name" (live)

== Charts ==
Chart (1993)	Peak position
Belgium (Ultratop 50 Flanders)	23
Europe (Eurochart Hot 100)	66
Europe (European Hit Radio)	11
Germany (GfK)	53
Netherlands (Dutch Top 40)	17
Netherlands (Single Top 100)	22
UK Singles (Official Charts)	24
UK Airplay (Music Week)	5

== Release history ==
Region	Date	Format(s)	Label(s)	Ref.
United Kingdom	5 July 1993	7-inch vinyl; CD; cassette	Virgin	
Australia	2 August 1993	CD; cassette	Virgin	
