= Strange Sensation (disambiguation) =

Strange Sensation is Robert Plant's backing band.

Strange Sensation or Strange Sensations may also refer to:

- "Strange Sensation" (song), a 1950s song written by Fred Wise, Kathleen Twomey, and Ben Weisman
- "Strange Sensations", a 1993 song by Orchestral Manoeuvres in the Dark on the B-side of "Dream of Me (Based on Love's Theme)"
- "Strange Sensation", a 2003 song by Bret Michaels from Songs of Life
