= Pandora's Box (Orchestral Manoeuvres in the Dark song) =

1991 single by Orchestral Manoeuvres in the Dark

Single by Orchestral Manoeuvres in the Dark

from the album Sugar Tax
- B-side: "All She Wants Is Everything"
- Released: 24 June 1991
- Length: 4:09 (album version); 4:06 (single version)
- Label: Virgin
- Songwriter: OMD
- Producer: OMD

Orchestral Manoeuvres in the Dark singles chronology
"Sailing on the Seven Seas" (1991)	"Pandora's Box" (1991)	"Then You Turn Away" (1991)

Music video
- "Orchestral Manoeuvres In The Dark - Pandora's Box" on YouTube

"Pandora's Box" (subtitled "It's a Long, Long Way" for the US release) is a song by the English electronic band Orchestral Manoeuvres in the Dark (OMD), released by Virgin Records on 24 June 1991 as the second single from their eighth studio album, Sugar Tax (1991). The song, which deals with the less glamorous side of celebrity, was inspired by silent film actress Louise Brooks and is named after the 1929 film Pandora's Box in which she starred.

The single was a top-10 hit in the United Kingdom and throughout Europe. Three remixes were made for this release, remixed by Danny Griffiths, Carl Segal, and Steve Anderson respectively. Anderson's shorter remix is the main single version. Additional remixes and edits appear on promotional and limited editions.

== Background ==
Andy McCluskey wrote "Pandora's Box" about the silent film actress Louise Brooks. He told the Edinburgh Evening News in 1991, "I've been fascinated by her for eight or nine years now. The more I learned the more fascinated I became. [She's] absolutely the sort of woman you'd fall in love with on first sight and absolutely the sort of person that you desperately shouldn't go anywhere near."

== Critical reception ==
Upon its release, David Quantick of NME remarked, "OMD this week don't know if they are a jovial Hazell Dean group or some wistful Enoesque melancholy merchants. It is this that gives them their force, that occupation of the dichotomous territories between art and pop." Andrew Hirst of the Huddersfield Daily Examiner picked "Pandora's Box" as the "Single of the Week", observing a "slice of synthesizer sophistication" whose "peculiar guitar twang really makes it". Alan Jones, writing for Music Week, called it a "melodic, bouncy pop song" that is "entrancing and addictive" and "should easily maintain their renewed impetus". "Pandora's Box" was listed as one of the best tracks of 1991. In a retrospective review for AllMusic, critic Dave Thompson noted a "fabulous dance-fired arrangement", a "jubilant melody" and a "bounding rhythm that defies efforts not to dance along". He added that the song's upbeat sound belies the "tragic tale" of its lyrics, which handle the "downside of fame and fortune".

== Music video ==
The music video for "Pandora's Box" is in black and white and features Louise Brooks and singer Andy McCluskey. According to the video intro, all of the scenes of Brooks in the video are from the original 1929 film.

== Track listings ==
- UK 7-inch and cassette single

A. "Pandora's Box"
B. "All She Wants Is Everything"

- UK 12-inch single

A1. "Pandora's Box" (Constant Pressure 12-inch mix)
A2. "All She Wants Is Everything"
B1. "Pandora's Box" (Abstract mix)

- UK CD1
1. "Pandora's Box"
2. "All She Wants Is Everything"
3. "Pandora's Box" (Constant Pressure 12-inch mix)
4. "Pandora's Box" (Diesel Fingers 12-inch mix)
- UK CD2
1. "Pandora's Box"
2. "Pandora's Box" (Lost Girl mix)
3. "Pandora's Box" (Abstract mix)
4. "Pandora's Box" (American Venus 7-inch mix)
- US cassette single
1. "Pandora's Box (It's a Long, Long Way)"
2. "Sugar Tax"
- US 12-inch single

A1. "Pandora's Box (It's a Long, Long Way)" (Diesel Fingers mix) – 6:10
A2. "Pandora's Box (It's a Long, Long Way)" (Abstract mix) – 6:37
B1. "Pandora's Box (It's a Long, Long Way)" (Constant Pressure 12-inch) – 4:48
B2. "Pandora's Box (It's a Long, Long Way)" (Prize of Beauty mix) – 5:35
B3. "Sugar Tax" – 4:07

- US CD single
1. "Pandora's Box (It's a Long, Long Way)" (Andy McCluskey 7-inch) – 4:04
2. "Pandora's Box (It's a Long, Long Way)" (Constant Pressure 12-inch) – 4:48
3. "Sugar Tax" – 4:07
4. "All She Wants Is Everything" – 4:22
- Australian CD and cassette single
1. "Pandora's Box"
2. "If You Leave"
3. "We Love You"
4. "Locomotion"
5. "All She Wants Is Everything"

== Charts ==
=== Weekly charts ===
Chart (1991–1992)	Peak position
Australia (ARIA)	53
Austria (Ö3 Austria Top 40)	7
Belgium (Ultratop 50 Flanders)	17
Europe (Eurochart Hot 100)	18
Europe (European Hit Radio)	4
France (SNEP)	49
Germany (GfK)	11
Ireland (IRMA)	19
Luxembourg (Radio Luxembourg)	6
Sweden (Sverigetopplistan)	7
UK Singles (Official Charts)	7
UK Playlist Chart (Music Week)	4
US 12-inch Singles Sales (Billboard)	25
US Dance Club Play (Billboard)	11
US Modern Rock Tracks (Billboard)	19

=== Year-end charts ===
Chart (1991)	Position
Europe (European Hit Radio)	27
Germany (Media Control)	67
Sweden (Topplistan)	52
UK Singles (OCC)	81

== Release history ==
Region	Date	Format(s)	Label(s)	Ref.
United Kingdom	24 June 1991	7-inch vinyl; cassette	Virgin	
United Kingdom	29 July 1991	CD	Virgin	
Australia	9 December 1991	CD; cassette	Virgin	

== Cover versions ==
- Estonian singer Jüri Homenja made a cover version of the song named "Pandora laegas".
