= Minimum-Maximum (video) =

Video by Kraftwerk
- Released: 2 December 2005
- Recorded: 2004
- Genre: Electronic music, synthpop
- Label: Kling Klang; EMI; Astralwerks
- Producer: Kraftwerk

Minimum-Maximum is a double DVD by German band Kraftwerk, consisting of live shows performed during their 2004 world tour. The set was released in Germany on 2 December 2005, in the UK on 5 December 2005 and 6 December 2005 in the US, Japan and Australia.

== Track listing ==
=== Disc one ===
1. "Meine Damen und Herren" – 0:35
2. "The Man-Machine" – 7:54
3. "Planet of Visions" – 4:46
4. "Tour de France '03" – 10:40
5. "Vitamin" – 6:42
6. "Tour de France" – 6:18
7. "Autobahn" – 8:52
8. "The Model" – 3:42
9. "Neonlights" – 5:52
10. "Radioactivity" – 7:41
11. "Trans Europe Express" – 9:38

=== Disc two ===
1. "Numbers" – 4:33
2. "Computer World" – 2:55
3. "Home Computer" – 5:55
4. "Pocket Calculator / Dentaku" – 6:14
5. "The Robots" – 7:23
6. "Elektrokardiogramm" – 4:42
7. "Aéro Dynamik" – 7:13
8. "Music Non Stop" – 9:49
9. "Aerodynamik - MTV" – 3:48

== Notebook ==
Notebook is the expanded version of the DVD. Initially released with PAL format DVDs in December 2005, the NTSC format version was delayed by a few weeks until early January 2006.

It contains the live concert DVD and audio CD albums, plus an 88-page commemorative hardback book of tour photographs. Like many other Kraftwerk products, it was released in both German and English language versions.

The photographs in the book are mostly images of Kraftwerk in performance during the 2004 world tour and follow the track sequence of that tour's live show.

The box packaging and contents were designed to mimic the appearance of the laptop computers Kraftwerk used during their performance.

== Release details ==
=== Minimum-Maximum DVD ===
| Region | Date | Label | Catalog number | Encoding | Lyrics |
|---|---|---|---|---|---|
| Germany | 2 December 2005 | EMI | 0946 3 36293 9 4 | PAL | German |
| EEC except Germany | 5 December 2005 | EMI | 0946 3 36294 9 | PAL | English |
| United States | 6 December 2005 | Astralwerks | ASW 36292, 0946 3 36292 9 5 | NTSC | English |

=== Minimum-Maximum Notebook ===
| Country | Date | Label | Catalog | Lyrics | Format |
|---|---|---|---|---|---|
| Germany | 9 December 2005 | EMI | ? | German | PAL |
| EEC except Germany | 12 December 2005 | EMI | 345 8552 | English | PAL |
| United States | 10 January 2006 | Astralwerks | ? | English | NTSC |
