= Liberator (album) =

Studio album by Orchestral Manoeuvres in the Dark
- Released: 14 June 1993
- Studios: The Pink Museum and The Ministry (Liverpool)
- Genres: Dance-pop; synth-pop
- Length: 49:02
- Label: Virgin
- Producers: Andy McCluskey; Phil Coxon; Barry White

Orchestral Manoeuvres in the Dark chronology
Sugar Tax (1991)	Liberator (1993)	Universal (1996)

Singles from Liberator
- 1. "Stand Above Me" Released: 4 May 1993; 2. "Dream of Me (Based on Love's Theme)" Released: 5 July 1993; 3. "Everyday" Released: 6 September 1993

Liberator is the ninth studio album by the English electronic band Orchestral Manoeuvres in the Dark (OMD), released on 14 June 1993 by Virgin. Recorded by OMD frontman Andy McCluskey along with musicians enlisted for the multi-million selling Sugar Tax (1991), the album ventures further into the dance-pop style explored by its predecessor.

Following the success of Sugar Tax, OMD staged a UK tour of large venues in support of Liberator, with Gary Numan as the opening act. The record did not match the popularity of its forebear, peaking at number 14 on the UK Albums Chart and selling almost half a million copies by mid-1996. It spawned three singles; lead single "Stand Above Me" and follow-up "Dream of Me" were Top 25 entries on the UK singles chart.

Reviews of Liberator were mixed. McCluskey has been critical of the record, calling it "busy and messy".

== Background ==
Liberator treads further into the dance-pop style explored by multi-million selling predecessor Sugar Tax (1991), and embraces techno and house influences. It was recorded at The Pink Museum and The Ministry in Liverpool. Following the success of Sugar Tax, OMD staged a UK tour of large venues in support of Liberator, with Gary Numan as the opening act.

The second single, "Dream of Me (Based on Love's Theme)", uses a sample from the instrumental piece "Love's Theme", originally released in 1973 by Barry White's Love Unlimited Orchestra. OMD co-founder Paul Humphreys, who had left the group in 1989, is credited as co-writer of third single "Everyday", which dates to 1987. "Sunday Morning" is a cover of a Velvet Underground song, originally featured on The Velvet Underground & Nico (1967).

"Heaven Is" was first performed live by OMD in September 1983, prior to the release of the following year's Junk Culture. The track did not make that album, nor The Pacific Age (1986), for which it was heavily considered. The final Liberator version contains some lyrical variations, such as the name of the pornographic actress Christy Canyon as opposed to newsreader Selina Scott in the 1983 version.

Liberator's title track was not completed in time for the album release. It was eventually included in the Souvenir 40th anniversary retrospective boxset in 2019, featuring on a CD of previously unreleased material. The track was first released in September on digital and streaming platforms ahead of the boxset. It was a song that McCluskey had been trying to write for several years from the late 1980s to the mid-1990s. The title inspiration comes from his love of WWII aircraft. There were several demo versions recorded, with the one released in 2019 being as close as the song got to the intended sound.

The cover art originally featured a variation of the "bomber girl" nose cone art used on many B-24 Liberator planes. The final artwork was designed by Area, with photography by Stephane Sednaoui and Joseph Hunwick.

== Reception ==
Professional ratings
Review scores
Source	Rating
AllMusic	2/5 stars
Chicago Tribune	2/4 stars
Classic Pop	3/5 stars
Daily Press	3.5/5 stars
Encyclopedia of Eighties Music	3/5 stars
Hinckley Times	6/10
Music Week	3/5 stars
The Rolling Stone Album Guide	3/5 stars
Sedalia Democrat	C
Select	2/5

Liberator met with mixed reviews. Mark LePage of The Gazette wrote, "The last of the Brit synth-pop electro-hookers has found freshness by re-tooling the genre's best moments... Liberator is hook-mad and relentlessly catchy, and even mildly inventive in parts." The Guardian's Caroline Sullivan stated, "McCluskey can still turn out a catchy tune without so much as rumpling his cardigan. If the 12 here sound familiar, maybe it's because much of today's dance-pop is descended from OMD's early sound. Still, the LP does wander down a few new by-ways." Jeffrey Lee Puckett of The Courier-Journal observed, "At least on much of Liberator, [OMD] manages to tickle some latent fancy, coming off as breezy fun rather than canned button-pushing... OMD makes electronics bend to the will of the lovesick heart, drawing melancholy from machinery."

The Morning Call's Len Righi said, "If you long for the days when silly synth pop ruled... Liberator will set your spirit free." Righi felt, however, that the bulk of the album "surrenders any claim to attention". Neil Spencer of The Observer stated, "Liberator repeats the [Sugar Tax] formula of swirling synths, crashing drum machines and trite, mournful songs; most of it sounds like the Brookside theme with added words, but of such banalities are massive hits made." Select's Dave Morrison described the record as "pleasant, disposable stuff", while Scott Hipper of the Santa Cruz Sentinel labelled it a "second-rate effort".

In a later review for Classic Pop, Wyndham Wallace wrote that Liberator "found OMD adrift", with McCluskey "embracing contemporary dance culture like a 'Cool Dad'." Trouser Press said, "All those years spent in the company of keyboards evidently left [McCluskey] fully able to make convincing percolating rhythms and layers of faux violins, and both get good use on what is a pretty stupid but diverting exercise." AllMusic editor Stephen Thomas Erlewine remarked, "While it is far from the experimental and edgy synth-pop that earned the group rave reviews in the early '80s, [Liberator] is an enjoyable, lightweight collection of appealing dance-pop."

Liberator had sold almost half a million copies by mid-1996.

== Band response ==
McCluskey has grown critical of Liberator, stating that he "messed up" the album. He has also been dismissive of the single "Everyday". In a 2019 interview McCluskey said:

"I screwed up. Stupidly, I unlearned all the lessons I had learned writing Sugar Tax. I rushed into Liberator, I let Phil Coxon co-produce. I was precious about my production, so we ended up with two layers of production. It all got busy and messy... I was aware that Britpop was approaching and I didn't know what I should do. I tried to incorporate techno and house, I got more dancey, I did it with the best will, but it didn't work."

== Track listing ==
All tracks are written by Andy McCluskey, except where noted.

Liberator track listing
No.	Title	Writer(s)	Length
1.	"Stand Above Me"	McCluskey; Stuart Kershaw; Lloyd Massett	3:33
2.	"Everyday"	McCluskey; Paul Humphreys; Kershaw	3:57
3.	"King of Stone"		4:17
4.	"Dollar Girl"		4:19
5.	"Dream of Me (Based on Love's Theme)"	McCluskey; Barry White	4:13
6.	"Sunday Morning"	Lou Reed; John Cale	3:23
7.	"Agnus Dei"	McCluskey; Christopher Tye; Shopsko	3:39
8.	"Love and Hate You"		3:18
9.	"Heaven Is"		4:30
10.	"Best Years of Our Lives"	McCluskey; Kershaw	4:35
11.	"Christine"	McCluskey; Kershaw	5:04
12.	"Only Tears"	McCluskey; Kershaw	4:14

== Personnel ==
- Andy McCluskey – programming, production on tracks 1–4, and 6–12
- Phil Coxon – programming, production on tracks 1–4, and 6–12
- Beverly Reppion – backing vocals on tracks 1, 2, 4, 5, 6, and 12
- Nathalie James – backing vocals on tracks 4, and 8
- Doreen Edwards – backing vocals on track 9
- Ibrahim Osi Efa – backing vocals on track 5
- Stuart Boyle – guitar on tracks 1, and 6
- Nigel Ipinson – piano and arrangement on track 6
- Le Mystère des Voix Bulgares – a sample from "Bezrodna Nevesta" is used in track 7
- Barry White – production on track 5
- Mark Phythian – engineer
- Paul Butcher – assistant engineer
- Ian Collins – assistant engineer
- Pat O'Shaughnessy – assistant engineer
- Mike Hunter – assistant engineer
- Andrea Wright – assistant engineer
- Tony Cousins – mastering at Town House, London
- Gregg Jackman – mix for tracks 1, 2, 4, 5, 9, 10, 12
- Niall Flynn – assistant mix for tracks 1, 2, 4, 5, 9, 10, 12

Mixed at Amazon Studios, Liverpool Tracks 1, 2, 4, 5, 9, 10, 12 mixed at Sarm West, London

== Charts ==
Chart performance for Liberator
Chart (1993)	Peak position
Dutch Albums (Album Top 100)	59
European Albums (Music & Media)	30
German Albums (Offizielle Top 100)	17
Hungarian Albums (MAHASZ)	35
Swedish Albums (Sverigetopplistan)	20
Swiss Albums (Schweizer Hitparade)	32
UK Albums (Official Charts)	14
US Billboard 200	169
