= Stand Above Me =

1993 single by Orchestral Manoeuvres in the Dark

Single by Orchestral Manoeuvres in the Dark

from the album Liberator
- B-side: "Can I Believe You"
- Released: 4 May 1993
- Studio: The Pink Museum, The Ministry (Liverpool, England)
- Genre: Synth-pop
- Length: 3:33
- Label: Virgin
- Songwriters: Andy McCluskey; Stuart Kershaw; Lloyd Massett
- Producers: Andy McCluskey; Phil Coxon

Orchestral Manoeuvres in the Dark singles chronology
"Call My Name" (1991)	"Stand Above Me" (1993)	"Dream of Me (Based on Love's Theme)" (1993)

Music video
- "Stand Above Me" on YouTube

"Stand Above Me" is a song by the English electronic band Orchestral Manoeuvres in the Dark (OMD), released by Virgin Records as the first single from their ninth album, Liberator (1993). It was the last OMD single released on a 12-inch format before the group took a break in 1996. The next 12-inch to be released under the OMD name was "Metroland" in March 2013.

An "anonymous" club 12-inch was released as "Liberator: Stand Above Me". It appeared to be credited to the act "Liberator". The song peaked at number five on the US Billboard Modern Rock Tracks chart and number six on the Billboard Dance Club Play chart.

== Reception ==
The Huddersfield Daily Examiner named "Stand Above Me" their "Single of the Week", observing "a strong slice of synth-pop with a grinding bass swell". Billboard wrote, "For public tastes that run to infectiously upbeat bubblegum pop with some muscle, this track, from the chronically overlooked venerable British pop outfit, will do the trick. Features fat, raspy synths, a rollicking beat, and sweet, strong vocal harmonies." Music Week scored the single 3/5 but considered it "bland" in comparison to OMD's earlier work. Everett True of Melody Maker was negative in his review, stating it was "for people who like their pop pre-digested" and asking, "Is it possible to sound any more soulless?"

== Track listings ==
- 7-inch and cassette single
1. "Stand Above Me" – 3:33
2. "Can I Believe You" – 3:52
- 12-inch single
1. "Stand Above Me" (Transcendental Constant Viper Trip mix)
2. "Stand Above Me"
3. "Stand Above Me" (A 10 Minute Therapy Session into Hyperlife mix)
- CD single
1. "Stand Above Me" – 3:33
2. "Stand Above Me" (Transcendental Constant Viper Trip mix) – 10:15
3. "Stand Above Me" (Hypnofunk mix) – 5:58
4. "Can I Believe You" – 3:52

== Charts ==
Chart (1993)	Peak position
Belgium (Ultratop 50 Flanders)	29
Europe (European Hot 100)	53
Europe (European Hit Radio)	19
Germany (GfK)	33
New Zealand (Recorded Music NZ)	39
Sweden (Sverigetopplistan)	28
UK Singles (Official Charts)	21
UK Airplay (Music Week)	5
US Bubbling Under Hot 100 Singles (Billboard)	11
US Dance Club Play (Billboard)	6
US Modern Rock Tracks (Billboard)	5
