= Falk Grieffenhagen =

German musician (born 1969)

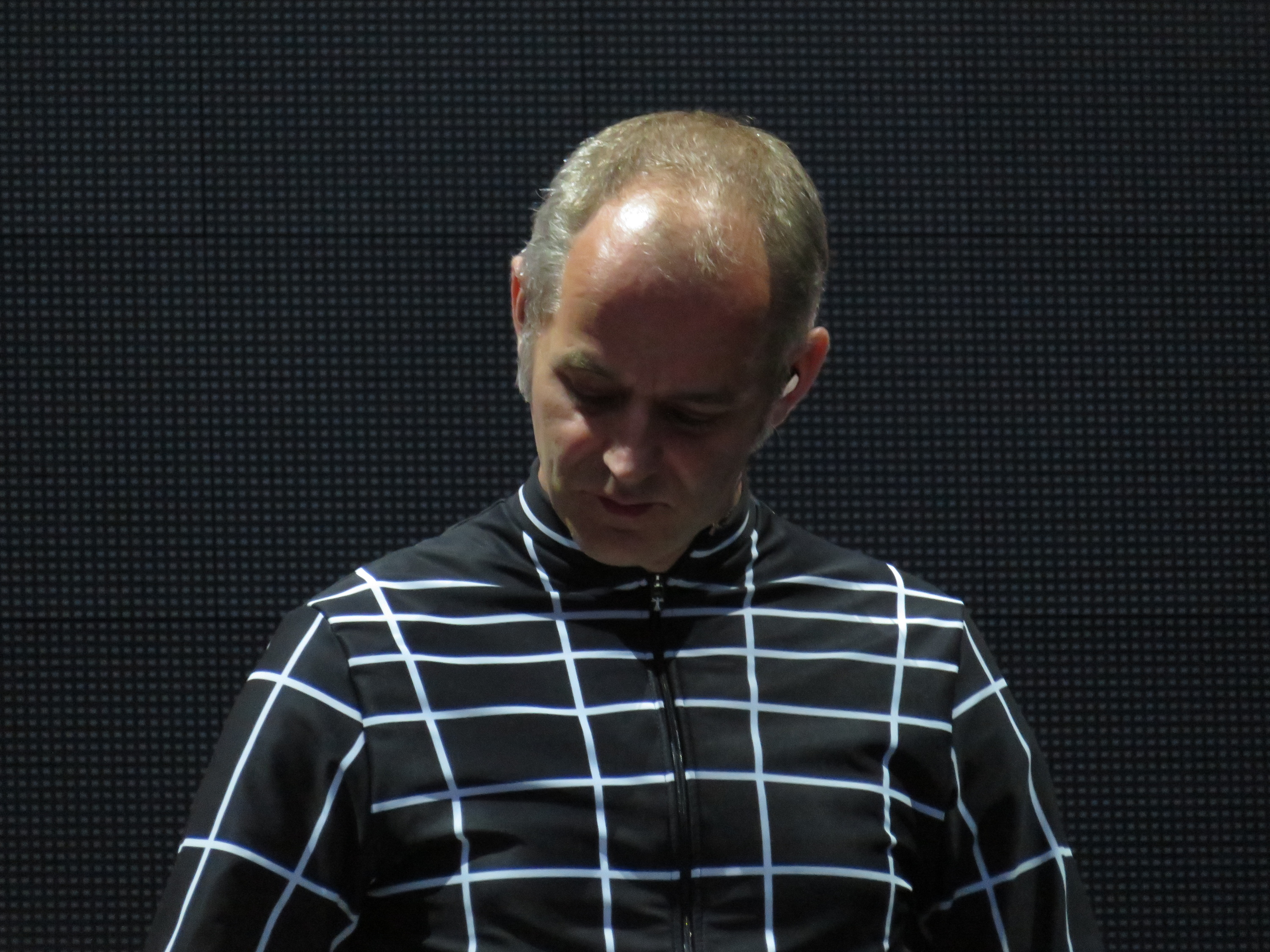
- Grieffenhagen performing with Kraftwerk in 2018

Background information
- Born: February 25, 1969 (age 57)
- Origin: Norden, Germany
- Genres: Krautrock
- Occupations: Audio engineer; video engineer; musician
- Instruments: Percussion; saxophone; flute; clarinet; piano
- Years active: 1996–present
- Website: kraftwerk.com

Falk Grieffenhagen (born 25 February 1969) is a German musician who is a member of the electronic/experimental pop band Kraftwerk.

== Background ==
Grieffenhagen studied sound and video engineering in Düsseldorf, and later studied saxophone, flute, clarinet and jazz piano in Cologne, finishing in 2004. He joined Kraftwerk as the live video-operator in 2012, replacing Stefan Pfaffe. He has worked freelance as a musician, composer, and sound engineer since 1996. Since 2023 tour, he replaced the role of Fritz Hilpert.
