= Sailing on the Seven Seas =

1991 single by Orchestral Manoeuvres in the Dark

Single by Orchestral Manoeuvres in the Dark

from the album Sugar Tax
- B-side: "Burning"; "Floating on the Seven Seas"; "Sugar Tax"; "Dancing on the Seven Seas"; "Big Town"
- Released: 18 March 1991
- Genre: Synth-pop
- Length: 3:45
- Label: Virgin
- Songwriters: OMD; Stuart Kershaw
- Producer: OMD

Orchestral Manoeuvres in the Dark singles chronology
"Brides of Frankenstein" (1988)	"Sailing on the Seven Seas" (1991)	"Pandora's Box" (1991)

Music video
- Sailing on the Seven Seas on YouTube

"Sailing on the Seven Seas" is a song by the English electronic music band Orchestral Manoeuvres in the Dark (OMD), released on 18 March 1991 by Virgin Records as the first single from their eighth studio album, Sugar Tax (1991). Along with 1981's "Souvenir", it is the band's highest-charting UK hit to date, peaking at number three on the UK singles chart. It also charted at number three in Austria and Sweden, number five in Ireland and number nine in Germany. The single was the first to be released by OMD without co-founder Paul Humphreys, who had left to form his own band the Listening Pool.

The song pays homage to various rock groups. The Velvet Underground song "Sister Ray" is directly referenced (OMD had previously covered "I'm Waiting for the Man" as a B-side to 1980 single "Messages"), and the line "people try to drag us down" is similar in melody and lyrical content to the opening line of the Who's "My Generation"; singer Andy McCluskey also noted that the track includes "Glitter Band-style" drumming.

== Reception and legacy ==
Richard Riccio of the St. Petersburg Times described "Sailing on the Seven Seas" as "fabulous... a rollicking foot-stomper in its original version, and a haunting late-night dance track in remixed [B-side] form." Multiple outlets ranked the song among the best of 1991. In a retrospective review, AllMusic critic Dave Thompson wrote that OMD "sail giddily through the musical past", delivering "a glorious musical mélange, an inspired melding of synth pop soar, 2-Tone yore, and glam rock roar, the anthemic chorus to the fore with a fist-in-the-air punch that shouts out for more". Classic Pop listed "Sailing on the Seven Seas" among the "Top 20 Comeback Singles" in history.

Humphreys described the track as "a great, kind of a weird pop song". Original OMD drummer Malcolm Holmes, who also had no involvement in the song, said, "I loathe the track – I do. But it charted and it did the business." After returning to the band, Holmes commented, "'Sailing on the Seven Seas' is a great thing to play as a drummer. When I started to play it, it became something else to me... so I don't really see the song as how I did in those days.

The singer Liz McClarnon says she first discovered "Sailing on the Seven Seas" through the compilation album Now That's What I Call Music! 20 (1991), and surprised McCluskey by singing it to him during her successful audition for McCluskey's girl group Atomic Kitten: "I started singing it to him. He was like 'Can't believe you know that'. So obviously then I stuck in his head."

== Versions and B-sides ==
The song was released as a 7-inch single version and in an extended version for the 12-inch release. The extended version was more oriented to the electronic dance music market in vogue at the time. Another mix entitled "Dancing on the Seven Seas" was also included on a special collector's edition CD single. The regular CD single featured another remix entitled "Floating on the Seven Seas" and the "Larrabee Mix" of "Sailing on the Seven Seas", similar to the original single version but mixed at Larrabee Studios in North Hollywood, California.

Two other new songs were included as B-sides or bonus tracks on the CD single: "Burning" and "Sugar Tax". Despite its title, "Sugar Tax" did not feature on the album of the same name. Both tracks feature on the B-sides compilation album Navigation: The OMD B-Sides (2001). "Sugar Tax" also features as a B-side on the later single release "Then You Turn Away".

A 12-inch promo single released in the US features further remixes, namely "Drowning on the Seven Seas", "Raving on the Seven Seas" and 'Mix 1' and 'Mix 2' of "Dancing on the Seven Seas". Although uncredited, many of the remixes were the work of Phil Coxon.

== Track listings ==
- 7-inch and cassette single
1. "Sailing on the Seven Seas"
2. "Burning"
- 12-inch single

A. "Sailing on the Seven Seas" (extended version)
B. "Floating on the Seven Seas"

- CD single
1. "Sailing on the Seven Seas"
2. "Floating on the Seven Seas"
3. "Sailing on the Seven Seas" (Larrabee mix)
4. "Sugar Tax"
- Special-edition CD single
1. "Sailing on the Seven Seas" (extended version)
2. "Burning"
3. "Dancing on the Seven Seas"
4. "Big Town"

== Charts ==
=== Weekly charts ===
Chart (1991)	Peak position
Australia (ARIA)	77
Austria (Ö3 Austria Top 40)	3
Belgium (Ultratop 50 Flanders)	39
Europe (Eurochart Hot 100)	7
Europe (European Hit Radio)	16
Finland (Suomen virallinen lista)	23
Germany (GfK)	9
Ireland (IRMA)	5
Luxembourg (Radio Luxembourg)	1
Sweden (Sverigetopplistan)	3
UK Singles (Official Charts)	3
UK Airplay (Music Week)	9
US Dance Club Play (Billboard)	9

=== Year-end charts ===
Chart (1991)	Position
Austria (Ö3 Austria Top 40)	14
Europe (Eurochart Hot 100)	48
Europe (European Hit Radio)	82
Germany (Media Control)	18
Sweden (Topplistan)	13
UK Singles (OCC)	42

=== Decade-end charts ===
Chart (1990–1999)	Rank
Austria (Ö3 Austria Top 40)	65

== Release history ==
Region	Date	Format(s)	Label(s)	Ref.
United Kingdom	18 March 1991	7-inch vinyl; 12-inch vinyl; CD	Virgin	
Australia	15 April 1991	7-inch vinyl; 12-inch vinyl; CD; cassette	Virgin	
Japan	21 May 1991	CD	Virgin	
