= Everyday (Orchestral Manoeuvres in the Dark song) =

1993 single by Orchestral Manoeuvres in the Dark

Single by Orchestral Manoeuvres in the Dark

from the album Liberator
- B-side: "Every Time"
- Released: 6 September 1993
- Recorded: Pink Museum, The Ministry (Liverpool, England)
- Length: 3:57
- Label: Virgin
- Songwriters: Andy McCluskey; Paul Humphreys; Stuart Kershaw
- Producers: Andy McCluskey; Phil Coxon

Orchestral Manoeuvres in the Dark singles chronology
"Dream of Me (Based on Love's Theme)" (1993)	"Everyday" (1993)	"Walking on the Milky Way" (1996)

Music video
- "Orchestral Manoeuvres In The Dark - Everyday" on YouTube

"Everyday" is a song by the English electronic band Orchestral Manoeuvres in the Dark (OMD), released as the third and final single from their ninth album, Liberator (1993). The track dates to 1987, with OMD co-founder Paul Humphreys – who left the group two years later – receiving a co-writing credit. "Everyday" was the only single from Liberator to miss the UK top 25, charting at number 59.

== Reception ==
Alan Jones of Music Week scored the single three-out-of-five, writing, "Jaunty, polished pop without a soul. Oh, for the more angst-ridden OMD of old. Still, it's the kind of song that will appeal to radio — very 'up' and sufficiently commercial to make the usual OMD splash." In a retrospective article, Classic Pop's Wyndham Wallace likened the track to a "horrifying" Stock Aitken Waterman pastiche. OMD frontman Andy McCluskey conceded, "Sadly it wasn't one of our better songs."

== Music video ==
The accompanying music video for "Everyday" was directed by Jimmy Fletcher and produced by Jonathan Hercock for Partizan. It was released on 6 September 1993 and features concert footage with cutaways to a young girl dressed as a matador. The video features Sara Cox, who would later be known as a BBC Radio DJ.

== Track listings ==
- UK 7-inch and cassette single
1. "Everyday"
2. "Every Time"
- UK CD1 and Australasian CD single
1. "Everyday"
2. "Every Time"
3. "Dream of Me (Based on Love's Theme)" (Interstella mix)
4. "Everyday" (Invisible Man mix)
- UK CD2
1. "Everyday"
2. "Electricity" (live)
3. "Walk Tall" (live)
4. "Locomotion" (live)

== Charts ==
Chart (1993)	Peak position
Germany (GfK)	60
UK Singles (Official Charts)	59

== Release history ==
Region	Date	Format(s)	Label(s)	Ref.
United Kingdom	6 September 1993	—N/a	Virgin	
Australia	4 October 1993	CD; cassette	Virgin	
