= Then You Turn Away =

1991 single by Orchestral Manoeuvres in the Dark

Single by Orchestral Manoeuvres in the Dark

from the album Sugar Tax
- B-side: "Sugar Tax"; "Area"; "Vox Humana"
- Released: 2 September 1991
- Length: 4:17
- Label: Virgin
- Songwriters: Andy McCluskey; Stuart Kershaw; Lloyd Massett
- Producer: OMD

Orchestral Manoeuvres in the Dark singles chronology
"Pandora's Box" (1991)	"Then You Turn Away" (1991)	"Call My Name" (1991)

Music video
- "Then You Turn Away" on YouTube

"Then You Turn Away" is a song by the English electronic band Orchestral Manoeuvres in the Dark (OMD), released on 2 September 1991, by Virgin Records, as the third single from their eighth studio album, Sugar Tax (1991). It peaked at number 50 on the UK singles chart the same month and also reached number 56 in Germany.

== B-sides ==
Originally, the music written by Andy McCluskey for the 1991 BBC G. F. Newman TV series For the Greater Good was to be included as the B-side for "Then You Turn Away", but it became Sugar Tax. This song in turn was scheduled as the title track of the album, but was not finished at the time the album was released. The CD singles contain the extra tracks "Area", "Vox Humana", and a remix of "Then You Turn Away", called the Infinite Repeat mix. "Vox Humana" uses a sample of a female Gregorian chant written by Hildegard of Bingen.

== Track listings ==
- CD1
1. "Then You Turn Away"
2. "Sugar Tax"
3. "Area"
4. "Then You Turn Away" (Infinite Repeat mix)
- CD2
1. "Then You Turn Away"
2. "Sailing on the Seven Seas"
3. "Then You Turn Away" (Infinite Repeat mix)
4. "Vox Humana"
- 7-inch and cassette single
1. "Then You Turn Away"
2. "Sugar Tax"

== Charts ==
Chart (1991)	Peak position
Europe (European Hit Radio)	32
Germany (GfK)	56
UK Singles (Official Charts)	50
UK Airplay (Music Week)	13
