= Fernando Abrantes =

German-Portuguese producer and musician

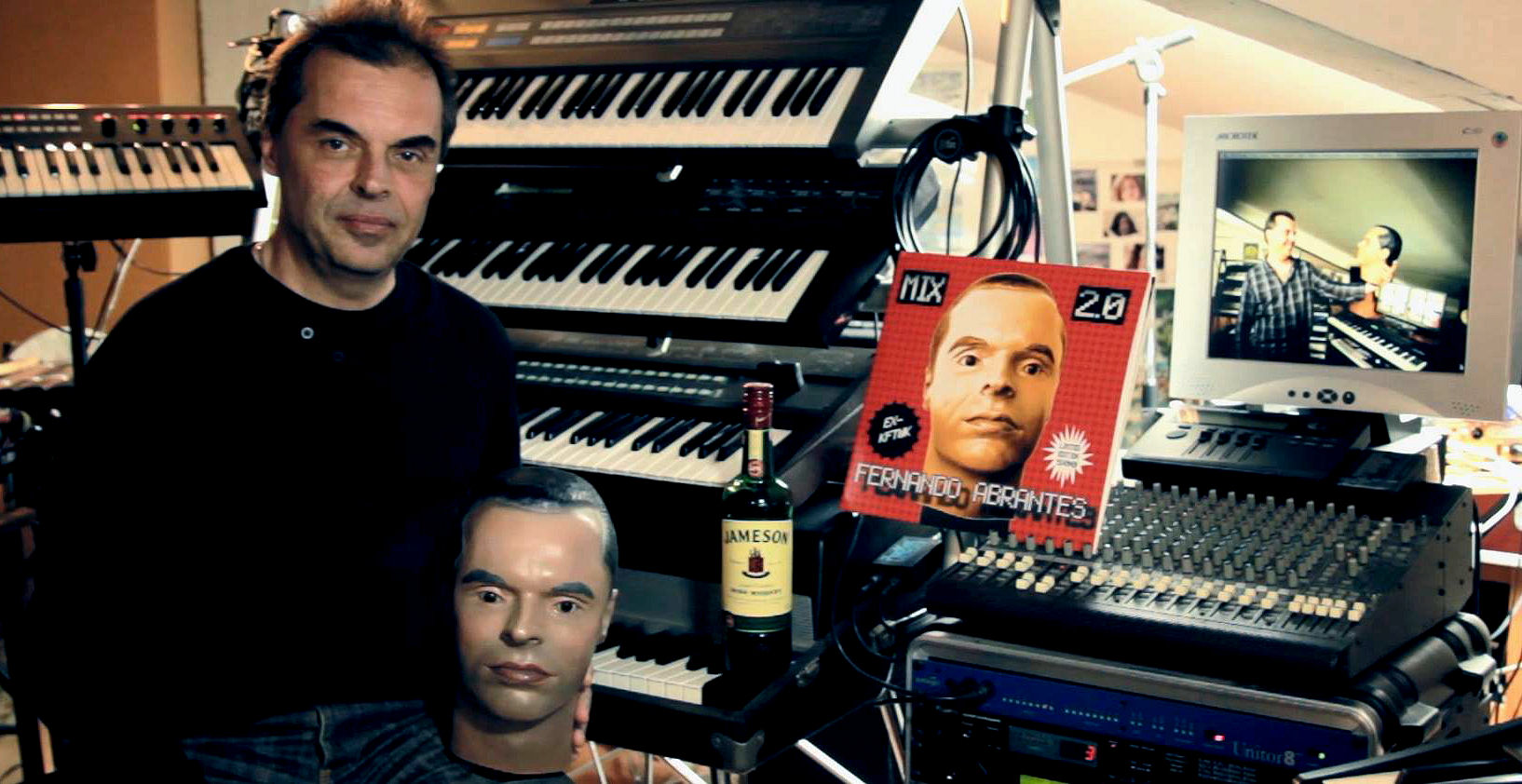

Background information
- Born: Fernando Fromm-Abrantes; 1960 (age 65–66); Lisbon, Portugal
- Origin: Germany
- Genres: Pop; synth-pop; ghettotech
- Years active: 1980s–present
- Formerly of: Kraftwerk

Fernando Fromm-Abrantes (born 1960) is a German-Portuguese producer and musician.

== Background ==
He has been a temporary member/keyboardist of the electronic/experimental pop band Kraftwerk.

He went to the German school in Lisbon. After finishing school he moved to Germany and studied music and electronics in Düsseldorf together with Kraftwerk members Fritz Hilpert and Kraftwerk. Afterwards he returned to Portugal. He lives in Lisbon, where he owns a music production studio. He is fluent in German, Portuguese and English.

In 1985-1986 he performed a few shows as keyboardist of Sandra and her world hit "Maria Magdalena".

Abrantes joined Kraftwerk in winter 1990-1991 during production of the album The Mix, shortly after the departure of electronic percussionist and songwriter Karl Bartos. Abrantes performed in The Mix UK-tour (10 concerts) in 1991. He can be seen in robotic form in promotional pictures from this period and in the booklet of the album The Mix, in addition to the music video for the updated version of "The Robots", made the same year. He also performed "The Robots" live with the band in the popular German TV show Mensch Meier.

Due to divergences about the band's artistic direction with the band's co-founder Ralf Hütter, Abrantes left Kraftwerk soon thereafter and was replaced by Kling Klang Studio studio engineer Henning Schmitz, who remains in the band to this day. Abrantes is one of the producers of the official music of the Expo '98.
