= Kraftwerk =

German electronic band

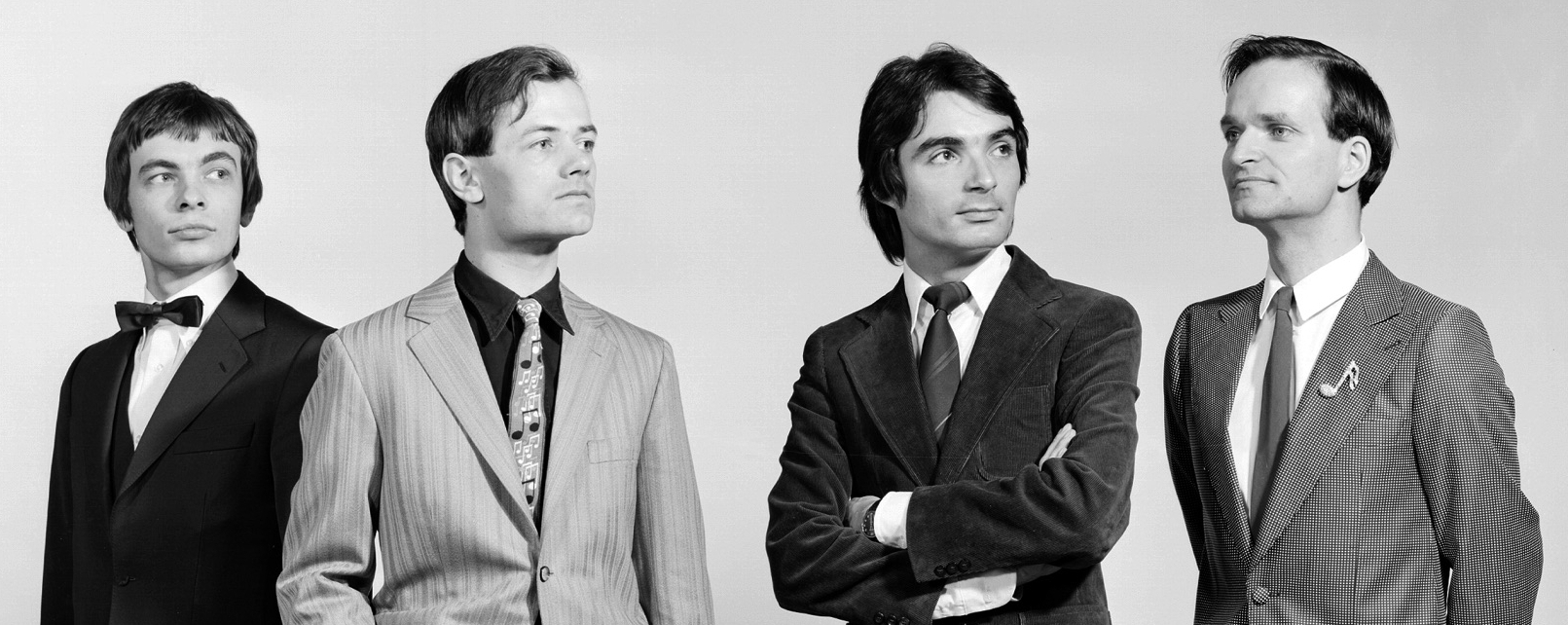
- Kraftwerk in 1975. From left: Karl Bartos, Ralf Hütter, Wolfgang Flür and Florian Schneider

Background information
- Origin: Düsseldorf, West Germany
- Genres: Electronic; synth-pop; krautrock
- Works: Kraftwerk discography
- Years active: 1970–present
- Labels: Kling Klang; EMI; Capitol; Warner Bros.; Philips; Vertigo; Mercury; Mute; Astralwerks; Elektra; Parlophone
- Spinoffs: Neu!
- Spinoff of: Organisation
- Members: Ralf Hütter; Henning Schmitz; Falk Grieffenhagen; Georg Bongartz
- Past members: Florian Schneider; Houschäng Nejadépour; Plato Kostic; Peter Schmidt; Hans-Günther Weiss; Thomas Lohmann; Eberhard Kranemann; Andreas Hohmann; Klaus Dinger; Michael Rother; Emil Schult; Wolfgang Flür; Klaus Röder; Karl Bartos; Fernando Abrantes; Stefan Pfaffe; Fritz Hilpert
- Website: kraftwerk.com

Kraftwerk (German pronunciation: [ˈkʁaftvɛʁk], lit. 'power plant') is a German electronic band formed in Düsseldorf in 1970 by Ralf Hütter and Florian Schneider. Widely considered innovators and pioneers of electronic music, Kraftwerk was among the first successful acts to popularise the genre. The group began as part of West Germany's experimental krautrock scene in the early 1970s before embracing electronic instrumentation, including synthesizers, drum machines, and vocoders. Wolfgang Flür joined in 1973 and Karl Bartos in 1975.

On commercially successful albums such as Autobahn (1974), Trans-Europe Express (1977), The Man-Machine (1978), and Computer World (1981), Kraftwerk developed a self-described "robot pop" style that combined electronic music with pop melodies, sparse arrangements, and repetitive rhythms, while adopting a stylised image including matching suits. Following the release of Electric Café (1986), Flür left in 1987, followed by Bartos in 1990. Kraftwerk released Tour de France Soundtracks, its most recent studio and concept album, in 2003. Schneider left in 2008 to pursue solo work and died in 2020. Kraftwerk has continued to tour under the leadership of Hütter.

Kraftwerk has influenced a range of artists and genres, including synth-pop, hip-hop, post-punk, techno, house music, ambient, and club music. In 2014, the Recording Academy honoured Kraftwerk with a Grammy Lifetime Achievement Award. The live album 3-D The Catalogue (2017) won the 2018 Grammy Award for Best Dance/Electronic Album. In 2021, Kraftwerk was inducted into the Rock & Roll Hall of Fame in the early influence category. In his speech to the German Bundestag on 30 March 2023, King Charles III also highlighted the group’s extraordinary achievements and significance for British musical culture. As of 2026, the band continues to tour, with the members' live performances celebrating Kraftwerk's fiftieth anniversary.

== History ==
=== Formation and early years (1970–1973) ===
Florian Schneider (flutes, synthesizers, violin) and Ralf Hütter (organ, synthesizers) met as students at the Robert Schumann Hochschule in Düsseldorf in the late 1960s, participating in the German experimental music and art scene of the time, which Melody Maker jokingly dubbed "krautrock".

They joined a quintet known as Organisation, which released one album, Tone Float in 1970, issued on RCA Records in the UK, and split shortly thereafter. Schneider became interested in synthesizers, deciding to acquire one in 1970. While visiting an exhibition in their hometown about visual artists Gilbert and George, they see "two men wearing suits and ties, claiming to bring art into everyday life. The same year, Hütter and Schneider started bringing everyday life into art and form Kraftwerk".

Early Kraftwerk line-ups from 1970 to 1974 fluctuated, as Hütter and Schneider worked with around a half-dozen other musicians during the preparations for and the recording of three albums and sporadic live appearances, including guitarist Michael Rother and drummer Klaus Dinger, who left to form Neu!. The only constant figure in these line-ups was Schneider, whose main instrument at the time was the flute; at times he also played the violin and guitar, all processed through a varied array of electronic devices. Hütter, who left the band for eight months to focus on completing his university studies, played synthesizer and keyboards (including Farfisa organ and electric piano).

The band released two free-form experimental rock albums, Kraftwerk (1970) and Kraftwerk 2 (1972). The albums were mostly exploratory musical improvisations played on a variety of traditional instruments including guitar, bass, drums, organ, flute, and violin. Post-production modifications to these recordings were used to distort the sound of the instruments, particularly audio-tape manipulation and multiple dubbings of one instrument on the same track. Both albums are purely instrumental. Live performances from 1972 to 1973 were mostly made as a duo, using a simple beat-box-type electronic drum machine with preset rhythms taken from an electric organ. Occasionally, they performed with bass players as well. These shows were mainly in Germany, with occasional shows in France. Later in 1973, Wolfgang Flür joined the group for rehearsals, and the unit performed as a trio on the television show Aspekte for German television network ZDF.

With Ralf & Florian, released in 1973, Kraftwerk began to rely more heavily on synthesizers and drum machines. Although almost entirely instrumental, the album marks Kraftwerk's first use of the vocoder in the song "Ananas Symphonie" (Pineapple Symphony,) which became one of its musical signatures. According to English music journalist Simon Reynolds, Kraftwerk were influenced by what he called the "adrenalized insurgency" of Detroit artists of the late '60s MC5 and the Stooges.

The input, expertise, and influence of producer and engineer Konrad "Conny" Plank was highly significant in the early years of Kraftwerk. Plank also worked with many of the other leading German electronic acts of that time, including members of Can, Neu!, Cluster, and Harmonia. As a result of his work with Kraftwerk, Plank's studio near Cologne became one of the most sought-after studios in the late 1970s. Plank co-produced the first four Kraftwerk albums.

=== International breakthrough: Autobahn and Radio-Activity (1974–1976) ===
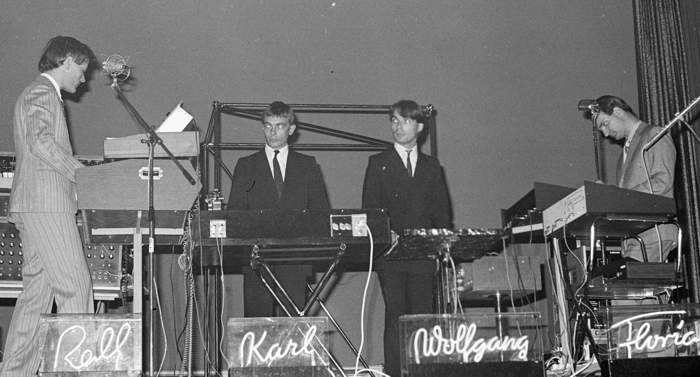
Concert in Zürich, 1976

"Autobahn"
An excerpt from Autobahn's closing section.

The release of Autobahn in 1974 saw Kraftwerk moving away from the sound of its first three albums. Hütter and Schneider had invested in newer technology such as the Minimoog and the EMS Synthi AKS, helping give Kraftwerk a newer, "disciplined" sound. Autobahn was also the last album that Conny Plank engineered. After the commercial success of Autobahn in the US, where it peaked at number 5 in the Billboard Top LPs & Tape, Hütter and Schneider invested in updating their studio, thus lessening their reliance on outside producers. At this time the painter and graphic artist Emil Schult became a regular collaborator, designing artwork, cowriting lyrics, and accompanying the group on tour.

The year 1975 saw a turning point in Kraftwerk's live shows. With financial support from Phonogram Inc., in the US, they were able to undertake a tour to promote the Autobahn album, a tour which took them to the US, Canada and the UK for the first time. The tour also saw a new, stable, live line-up in the form of a quartet. Hütter and Schneider continued playing keyboard synthesizers such as the Minimoog and ARP Odyssey, with Schneider's use of flute diminishing. The two men started singing live for the first time, and Schneider processing his voice with a vocoder live. Wolfgang Flür and new recruit Karl Bartos performed on home-made electronic percussion instruments. Bartos also used a Deagan vibraphone on stage. The Hütter-Schneider-Bartos-Flür formation remained in place until the late 1980s and is now regarded as the classic live line-up of Kraftwerk. Emil Schult generally fulfilled the role of tour manager.

After the 1975 Autobahn tour, Kraftwerk began work on a follow-up album, Radio-Activity (German title: Radio-Aktivität). After further investment in new equipment, the Kling Klang Studio became a fully working recording studio. The group used the central theme in radio communication, which had become enhanced on their last tour of the United States. With Emil Schult working on artwork and lyrics, Kraftwerk began to compose music for the new record. Even though Radio-Activity was less commercially successful than Autobahn in the UK and United States, the album served to open up the European market for Kraftwerk, earning them a gold disc in France. Kraftwerk made videos and performed several European live dates to promote the album. With the release of Autobahn and Radio-Activity, Kraftwerk left behind avant-garde experimentation and moved towards the electronic pop tunes for which they are best known.

In 1976, Kraftwerk toured in support of the Radio-Activity album. David Bowie was among the fans of the record and invited the band to support him on his Station to Station tour, an offer the group declined. Despite some innovations in touring, Kraftwerk took a break from live performances after the Radio-Activity tour of 1976.

=== Trans-Europe Express, The Man-Machine and Computer World (1977–1982) ===
After having finished the Radio-Activity tour Kraftwerk began recording Trans-Europe Express (German: Trans-Europa-Express) at the Kling Klang Studio. Trans-Europe Express was mixed at the Record Plant Studios in Los Angeles. It was around this time that Hütter and Schneider met David Bowie at the Kling Klang Studio. A collaboration was mentioned in an interview (Brian Eno) with Hütter, but it never materialised. The release of Trans-Europe Express in March 1977 was marked with an extravagant train journey used as a press conference by EMI France. The album won a disco award in New York later that year.

In May 1978 Kraftwerk released The Man-Machine (German: Die Mensch-Maschine), recorded at the Kling Klang Studio. Due to the complexity of the recording, the album was mixed at Studio Rudas in Düsseldorf. The band hired sound engineer Leanard Jackson from Detroit to work with Joschko Rudas on the final mix. The Man-Machine was the first Kraftwerk album where Karl Bartos was cocredited as a songwriter. The cover, produced in black, white and red, was inspired by Russian artist El Lissitzky and the Suprematism movement. Gunther Frohling photographed the group for the cover, a now-iconic image which featured the quartet dressed in red shirts and black ties. After it was released Kraftwerk did not release another album or tour for three years.

In May 1981 Kraftwerk released Computer World (German: Computerwelt) on EMI Records. It was recorded at Kling Klang Studio between 1978 and 1981. Much of this time was spent modifying the studio to make it portable so the band could take it on tour. Some of the electronic vocals on Computer World were generated using a Texas Instruments language translator. "Computer Love" was released as a single backed with the Man-Machine track "The Model". Radio DJs were more interested in the B-side so the single was repackaged by EMI and re-released with "The Model" as the A-side. The single reached number one in the UK, making "The Model" Kraftwerk's most successful song in that country. As a result, the Man-Machine album also became a success in the UK, peaking at number 9 in the album chart in February 1982. The band's live set focused increasingly on song-based material, with greater use of vocals and the use of sequencing equipment for both percussion and music. In contrast to their cool and controlled image, the group used sequencers interactively, which allowed for live improvisation. Ironically, Kraftwerk did not own a computer at the time of recording Computer World.

Kraftwerk returned to live performance with the Computer World tour of 1981, where the band effectively packed up its entire Kling Klang studio and took it along on the road. It also made greater use of live visuals including back-projected slides and films synchronised with the music as the technology developed, the use of hand-held miniaturised instruments during the set, and the use of replica mannequins of themselves to perform on stage during the song "The Robots".

=== Electric Café (1982–1989) ===
In 1982, Kraftwerk began to work on a new album that initially had the working title Technicolor but due to trademark issues was changed to Electric Café for its original release in 1986 (for a remastered re-release in 2009, it was retitled again after its original working title, Techno Pop).

One of the songs from these recording sessions was "Tour de France", which EMI released as a single in 1983. This song was a reflection of the band's new-found obsession with cycling. After the physically demanding Computer World tour, Ralf Hütter had been looking for forms of exercise that fitted in with the image of Kraftwerk; subsequently he encouraged the group to become vegetarians and take up cycling. "Tour de France" included sounds that followed this theme including bicycle chains, gear mechanisms and the breathing of the cyclist.

At the time of the single's release, Ralf Hütter tried to persuade the rest of the band that they should record a whole album based on cycling. The other members of the band were not convinced, and the theme was left to the single alone. "Tour de France" was released in German and French. The vocals of the song were recorded on the Kling Klang Studio stairs to create the right atmosphere. "Tour de France" was featured in the 1984 film Breakin', showing the influence that Kraftwerk had on West Coast hip-hop.

In May or June 1982, during the recording of "Tour de France", Ralf Hütter was involved in a serious cycling accident. He suffered head injuries and remained in a coma for several days. Following the single's release, Wolfgang Flür was beginning to spend less time in the studio. Since the band began using sequencers, his role as a drummer was becoming less frequent. He preferred to spend his time travelling with his girlfriend. Flür was also experiencing artistic difficulties with the band.

Though he toured the world with Kraftwerk as a drummer in 1981, his playing does not appear on that year's Computer World and neither on the 1986 album Electric Café. He would appear for the final time in the music video for "The Telephone Call", in 1987. As he declined to perform with the band in its Italian concerts in 1990 he was replaced on-stage by Fritz Hilpert.

=== The Mix (1990–1999) ===
After years of withdrawal from live performance Kraftwerk began to tour Europe more frequently. In February 1990 the band played a few secret shows in Italy. Karl Bartos left the band shortly afterwards. The next proper tour was in 1991, for the album The Mix. Hütter and Schneider wished to continue the synth-pop quartet style of presentation, and recruited Fernando Abrantes as a replacement for Bartos. Abrantes left the band shortly after though. In late 1991, long-time Kling Klang Studio sound engineer Henning Schmitz was brought in to finish the remainder of the tour and to complete a new version of the quartet that remained active until Schneider's departure in 2008.

In 1997, Kraftwerk made a famous appearance at the dance festival Tribal Gathering held in England. In 1998, the group toured the US and Japan for the first time since 1981, along with shows in Brazil and Argentina. Three new songs were performed during this period which remain unreleased. Following this trek, the group decided to take another break.

In July 1999 the single "Tour de France" was reissued in Europe by EMI after it had been out of print for several years. It was released for the first time on CD in addition to a repressing of the 12-inch vinyl single. Both versions feature slightly altered artwork that removed the faces of Flür and Bartos from the four-man cycling paceline depicted on the original cover. In 1999, Flür published his autobiography in German, Ich war ein Roboter. Later English-language editions of the book were titled Kraftwerk: I Was a Robot.

In 1999, Kraftwerk were commissioned to create an a cappella jingle for the Hannover Expo 2000 world's fair in Germany. The jingle was subsequently developed into the single "Expo 2000", which was released in December 1999, and remixed and re-released as "Expo Remix" in November 2000.

=== Tour de France Soundtracks and touring the world (2000–2009) ===
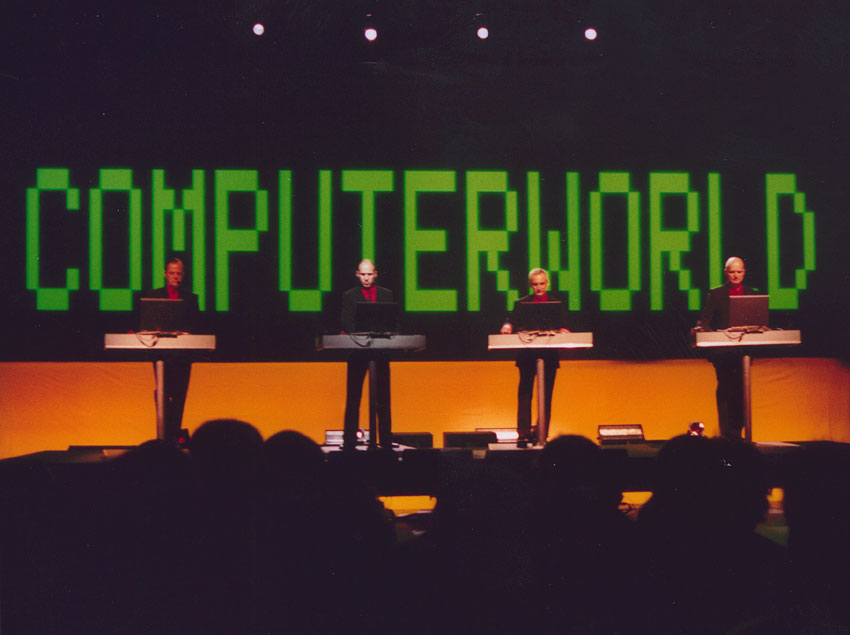
In Stockholm, February 2004

In August 2003 the band released Tour de France Soundtracks, its first album of new material since 1986's Electric Café. In January and February 2003, before the release of the album, the band started the extensive Minimum-Maximum world tour, using four customised Sony VAIO laptop computers, effectively leaving the entire Kling Klang studio at home in Germany. The group also obtained a new set of transparent video panels to replace its four large projection screens. This greatly streamlined the running of all of the group's sequencing, sound-generating, and visual-display software. From this point, the band's equipment increasingly reduced manual playing, replacing it with interactive control of sequencing equipment. Hütter retained the most manual performance, still playing musical lines by hand on a controller keyboard and singing live vocals and having a repeating ostinato. Schneider's live vocoding had been replaced by software-controlled speech-synthesis techniques. In November, the group made a surprising appearance at the MTV European Music Awards in Edinburgh, Scotland, performing "Aerodynamik". The same year a promotional box set titled 12345678 (subtitled The Catalogue) was issued, with plans for a proper commercial release to follow. The box featured remastered editions of the group's eight core studio albums, from Autobahn to Tour de France Soundtracks. This long-awaited box-set was eventually released in a different set of remasters in November 2009.

In June 2005 the band's first-ever official live album, Minimum-Maximum, which was compiled from the shows during the band's tour of spring 2004, received praise from NME. The album contained reworked tracks from existing studio albums. This included a track titled "Planet of Visions" that was a reworking of "Expo 2000". In support of this release, Kraftwerk made another quick sweep around the Balkans with dates in Serbia, Bulgaria, Macedonia, Turkey, and Greece. In December, the Minimum-Maximum DVD was released. During 2006, the band performed at festivals in Norway, Ireland, the Czech Republic, Spain, Belgium, and Germany.

In April 2008 the group played three shows in US cities Minneapolis, Milwaukee, and Denver, and were a coheadliner at the Coachella Valley Music and Arts Festival. This was its second appearance at the festival since 2004. Further shows were performed in Ireland, Poland, Ukraine, Australia, New Zealand, Hong Kong and Singapore later that year. The touring quartet consisted of Ralf Hütter, Henning Schmitz, Fritz Hilpert, and video technician Stefan Pfaffe, who became an official member in 2008. Original member Florian Schneider was absent from the lineup. Hütter stated that he was working on other projects. On 21 November, Kraftwerk officially confirmed Florian Schneider's departure from the band; The Independent commented: "There is something brilliantly Kraftwerkian about the news that Florian Schneider, a founder member of the German electronic pioneers, is leaving the band to pursue a solo career. Many successful bands break up after just a few years. It has apparently taken Schneider and his musical partner, Ralf Hütter, four decades to discover musical differences." Kraftwerk's headline set at Global Gathering in Melbourne, Australia, on 22 November was cancelled moments before it was scheduled to begin, due to Fritz Hilpert experiencing a medical emergency.

In 2009, Kraftwerk performed concerts with special 3D background graphics in Wolfsburg, Germany; Manchester, UK; and Randers, Denmark. Members of the audience were able to watch this multimedia part of the show with 3D glasses, which were given out. During the Manchester concert (part of the 2009 Manchester International Festival) four members of the GB cycling squad (Jason Kenny, Ed Clancy, Jamie Staff and Geraint Thomas) rode around the Velodrome while the band performed "Tour de France". The group also played several festival dates, the last being at the Bestival 2009 in September, on the Isle of Wight. 2009 also saw the release of The Catalogue box set in November. It is a 12-inch album-sized box set containing all eight remastered CDs in cardboard slipcases, as well as LP-sized booklets of photographs and artwork for each individual album.

=== The Catalogue and continued touring (2010–2017) ===
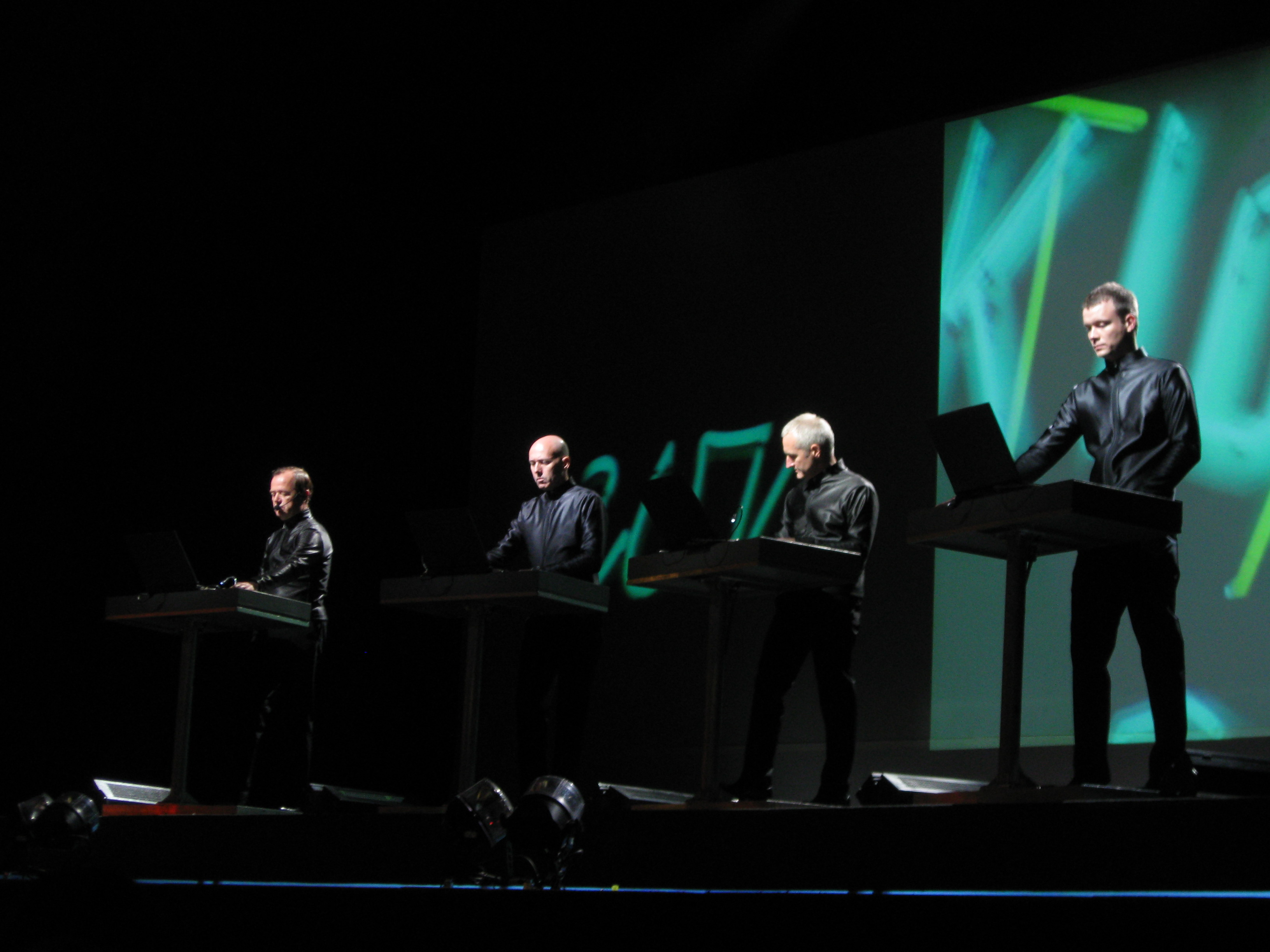
Kraftwerk performing in Kyiv, 2008

Although not officially confirmed, Ralf Hütter suggested that a second boxed set of their first three experimental albums—Kraftwerk, Kraftwerk 2 and Ralf and Florian—could be on its way, possibly seeing commercial release after their next studio album: "We've just never really taken a look at those albums. They've always been available, but as really bad bootlegs. Now we have more artwork. Emil has researched extra contemporary drawings, graphics, and photographs to go with each album, collections of paintings that we worked with, and drawings that Florian and I did. We took a lot of Polaroids in those days."

Meanwhile, Kraftwerk also released an iOS app called Kraftwerk Kling Klang Machine. The Lenbach House in Munich exhibited some Kraftwerk 3-D pieces in Autumn 2011. Kraftwerk performed three concerts to open the exhibit.

Kraftwerk played at Ultra Music Festival in Miami on 23 March 2012. Initiated by Klaus Biesenbach, the Museum of Modern Art of New York organised an exhibit titled Kraftwerk – Retrospective 1 2 3 4 5 6 7 8 where the band performed their studio discography from Autobahn to Tour de France over the course of eight days to sell-out crowds. The exhibit later toured to the Tate Gallery as well as to K20 in Düsseldorf.

Kraftwerk performed at the No Nukes 2012 Festival in Tokyo, Japan. Kraftwerk was also going to play at the Ultra Music Festival in Warsaw, but the event was cancelled; instead, Kraftwerk performed at Way Out West in Gothenburg. A limited-edition version of the Catalogue box set was released during the retrospective, restricted to 2000 sets. Each box was individually numbered and inverted the colour scheme of the standard box.

In December, Kraftwerk stated on its website that it would be playing its Catalogue in Düsseldorf and at London's Tate Modern. Kraftwerk tickets were priced at £60 in London, but fans compared that to the $20 ticket price for tickets at New York's MoMA in 2012, which caused consternation. Even so, the demand for the tickets at The Tate was so high that it shut down the website.

In March 2013, the band was not allowed to perform at a music festival in China due to unspecified "political reasons". In an interview in June after performing the eight albums of The Catalogue in Sydney, Ralf Hütter stated: "Now we have finished one to eight, now we can concentrate on number nine." In July, it performed at the 47th Montreux Jazz Festival. The band also played a 3-D concert on 12 July at Scotland's biggest festival – T in the Park – in Balado, Kinross, as well as 20 July at Latitude Festival in Suffolk, and 21 July at the Longitude Festival in Dublin.

In October 2013 the band played four concerts, over two nights, in Eindhoven, Netherlands. The venue, Evoluon (the former technology museum of Philips Electronics, now a conference center) was handpicked by Ralf Hütter, for its retro-futuristic UFO-like architecture. Bespoke visuals of the building, with the saucer section descending from space, were displayed during the rendition of Spacelab.

In 2014, Kraftwerk brought its four-night, 3D Catalogue tour to the Walt Disney Concert Hall in Los Angeles, and at NYC's United Palace Theatre. It also played at the Cirkus in Stockholm, Sweden and at the music festival Summer Sonic in Tokyo, Japan. In November 2014 the 3D Catalogue live set was played in Paris, France, at the brand new Fondation Louis-Vuitton from 6 to 14 November. and then in the iconic Paradiso concert hall in Amsterdam, Netherlands, where they played before in 1976. In 2015, Ralf Hütter, being told that the Tour de France would be starting that year in the nearby Dutch city of Utrecht, decided that Kraftwerk would perform during the "Grand Départ". Eventually the band played three concerts 3 and 4 July in TivoliVredenburg performing "Tour de France Soundtracks" and visited the start of the Tour in-between.

At the request of race director Christian Prudhomme, Kraftwerk performed at the Tour de France on 1 July 2017, this time in Kraftwerk's hometown Düsseldorf. French electronic band Air opened the concert, invited by Kraftwerk. Concertgoers were offered 3D glasses to perceive stereoscopic effects on the video screen.

=== 3-D The Catalogue and Schneider's death (2017–present) ===
In April 2017, Kraftwerk announced 3-D The Catalogue, a live album and video documenting performances of all eight albums in The Catalogue that was released 26 May 2017. It is available in multiple formats, the most extensive of which being a 4-disc Blu-ray set with a 236-page hardback book. The album was nominated for the Grammy Awards for Best Dance/Electronic Album and Best Surround Sound Album at the ceremony that took place on 28 January 2018, winning the former, which became the band's first Grammy win.

On 20 July 2018, at a concert in Stuttgart, German astronaut Alexander Gerst performed "Spacelab" with the band while aboard the International Space Station, joining via a live video link. Gerst played melodies using a tablet as his instrument alongside Hütter as a duet, and delivered a short message to the audience.

On 20 July 2019, Kraftwerk headlined the Saturday night lineup on the Lovell Stage at Bluedot Festival, a music and science festival held annually at Jodrell Bank Observatory, Cheshire, UK. The 2019 festival celebrated the 50th anniversary of the Apollo 11 Moon landing.

On 21 April 2020, Florian Schneider died at age 73 after a brief battle with cancer. On 3 July 2020, the German-language versions of Trans Europe Express, The Man Machine, Computer World, Techno Pop and The Mix, alongside 3-D The Catalogue, were released worldwide on streaming services for the first time.

On 21 December 2020, Parlophone/WEA released Remixes, a digital compilation album. It includes remixed tracks taken from singles released in 1991, 1999, 2000, 2004 and 2007, plus the previously unreleased "Non Stop", a version of "Musique Non-Stop" used as a jingle by MTV Europe beginning in 1993. The cover re-uses the cover from "Expo Remix". The compilation was released on CD and vinyl in 2022 following the release of 2021 edits of both "Home Computer" and "Tour De France (Etape 2)".

On 30 October 2021, Kraftwerk was inducted into the Rock & Roll Hall of Fame. In November 2021, the band announced plans for a 2022 North American tour. With the members' live performances celebrating Kraftwerk's fiftieth anniversary, the Remixes compilation album came out on compact disc and vinyl for the first time in addition.

From 27 May to 10 July 2022, the formation undertook a successful North American tour, performing in 24 cities.

Since 2023, it has begun visualising its music on the façades of castles and other historic buildings in a special way.

In May 2024, it performed nine nights at the Walt Disney Concert Hall in Los Angeles, presenting one of its eight albums each night and another concert as the ninth gig.

On 27 July 2024, at the Fuji Rock Festival in Naeba, Kraftwerk played a cover version of another artist's work for the first time, "Merry Christmas Mr. Lawrence" by Ryuichi Sakamoto, who died in 2023. Hütter had been friends with Sakamoto since 1981. After performing "Merry Christmas Mr. Lawrence", Kraftwerk played "Radioactivity", for which Sakamoto wrote the Japanese lyrics in 2012.

On 4 December 2024, Kraftwerk announced their Multimedia Tour to commemorate the 50th anniversary of Autobahn, enlisting professional skateboarder Tony Hawk in doing so.

== Music and artistry ==
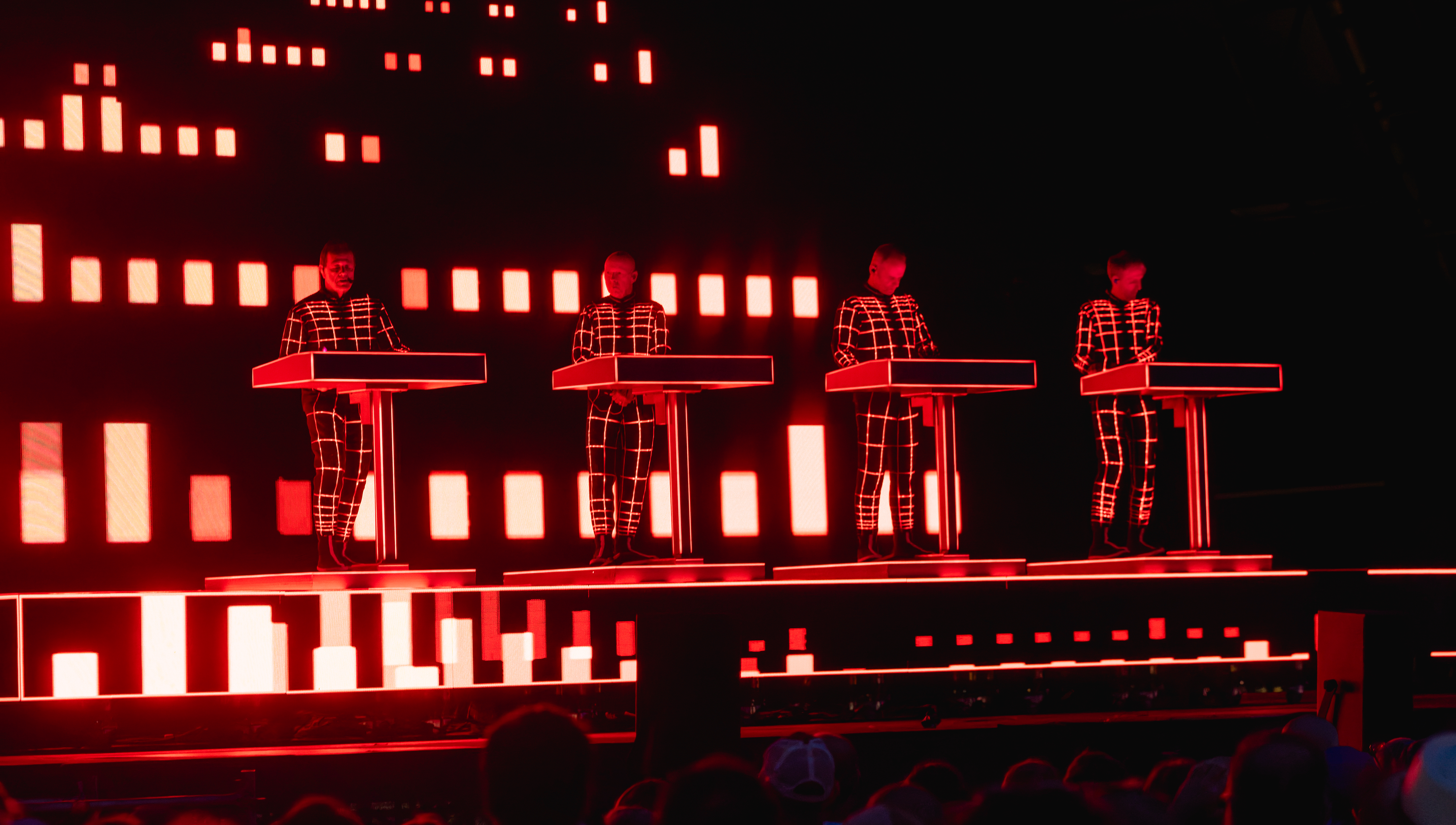

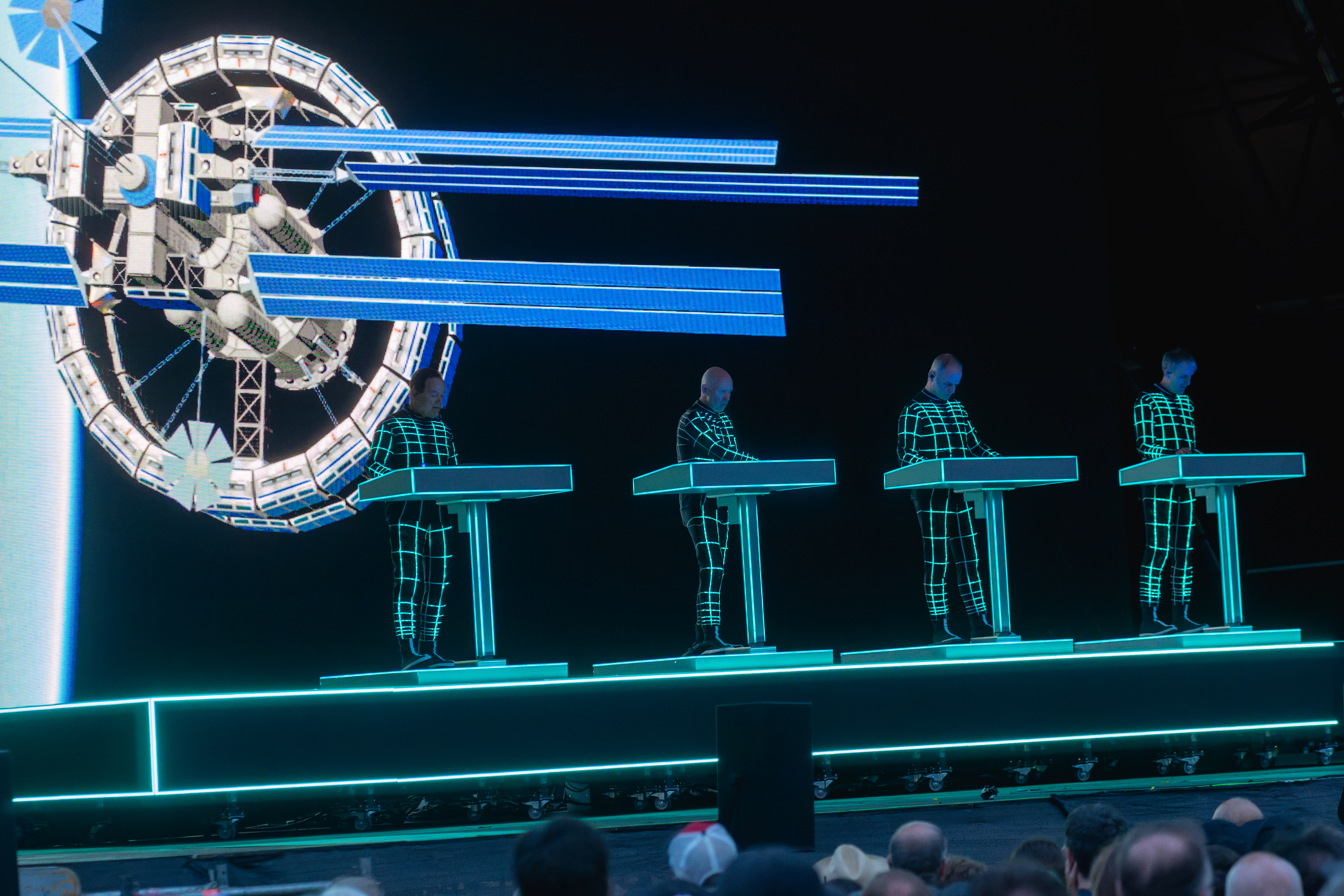
Kraftwerk performing at the Forever Now Fest at the National Bowl, Milton Keynes, UK. June 2025

=== Style ===
Kraftwerk have been recognised as pioneers of electronic music. The group was also inspired by the funk music of James Brown and, later, punk rock. They were initially connected to the German krautrock scene. In the mid-1970s, it transitioned to an electronic sound that the band described as "robot pop".

The lyrics tend towards minimalism but reveal both an innocent celebration of, and a knowing caution about, the modern world, as well as playing an integral role in the rhythmic structure of the songs. Many of Kraftwerk's songs express the paradoxical nature of modern urban life: a strong sense of alienation coexisting with a celebration of the joys of modern technology. In its early incarnation, the band pursued an avant-garde, experimental rock style inspired by the compositions of Karlheinz Stockhausen. Hütter has also listed the Beach Boys as a major influence.

Kraftwerk's lyrics dealt with post-war European urban life and technology—traveling by car on the Autobahn, traveling by train, using home computers, and the like. They were influenced by the modernist Bauhaus aesthetic, seeing art as inseparable from everyday function.

Starting with the release of Autobahn, Kraftwerk began to release a series of concept albums (Radio-Activity, Trans-Europe Express, The Man-Machine, Computer World, Tour de France Soundtracks). All of Kraftwerk's albums from Trans Europe Express onwards, except Tour de France Soundtracks, have been released in separate versions: one with German vocals for sale in Germany, Switzerland and Austria and one with English vocals for the rest of the world, with occasional variations in other languages when conceptually appropriate. Live performance has always played an important part in Kraftwerk's activities.

Also, despite its live shows generally being based around formal songs and compositions, live improvisation often plays a noticeable role in its performances. This trait can be traced back to the group's roots in the first experimental Krautrock scene of the late 1960s, but, significantly, it has continued to be a part of its playing even as it makes ever greater use of digital and computer-controlled sequencing in its performances. Some of the band's familiar compositions have been observed to have developed from live improvisations at its concerts or sound-checks.

=== Technological innovations ===
Throughout its career, Kraftwerk pushed the limits of music technology with some notable innovations, such as home-made instruments and custom-built devices. The group has always perceived its Kling Klang Studio as a complex music instrument, as well as a sound laboratory; Florian Schneider in particular developed a fascination with music technology, with the result that the technical aspects of sound generation and recording gradually became his main fields of activity within the band. Alexei Monroe called Kraftwerk the "first successful artists to incorporate representations of industrial sounds into non-academic electronic music".

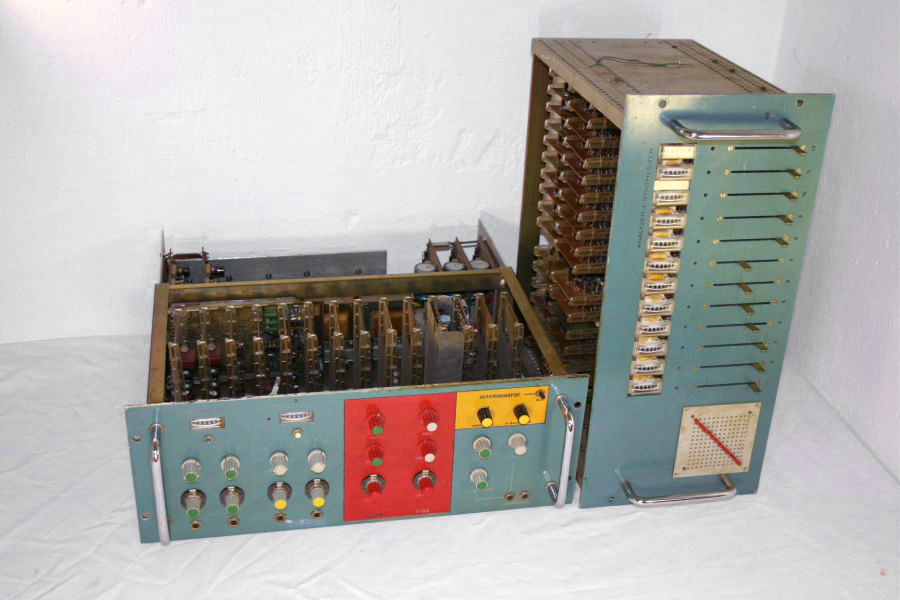
Early 1970s vocoder, custom-built for Kraftwerk

Kraftwerk used a custom-built vocoder on its albums Ralf & Florian and Autobahn; the device was constructed by engineers P. Leunig and K. Obermayer of the Physikalisch-Technische Bundesanstalt Braunschweig. Hütter and Schneider received a patent for an electronic drum kit with sensor pads, filed in July 1975 and issued in June 1977. It must be hit with metal sticks, which are connected to the device to complete a circuit that triggers analog synthetic percussion sounds. The band first performed in public with this device in 1973, on the television program Aspekte (on the all-German channel Zweites Deutsches Fernsehen), where it was played by Wolfgang Flür. They created drum machines for Autobahn and Trans-Europe Express.

For the Radio-Activity tour in 1976, Kraftwerk tested out an experimental light-beam-activated drum cage that allowed Flür to trigger electronic percussion through arm and hand movements. Unfortunately, the device did not work as planned, and it was quickly abandoned. The same year Ralf Hütter and Florian Schneider commissioned Bonn-based Synthesizerstudio Bonn, Matten & Wiechers to design and build the Synthanorma Sequenzer with Intervallomat, a 4×8 / 2×16 / 1×32 step-sequencer system with some features that commercial products couldn't provide at that time. The music sequencer was used by the band for the first time to control the electronic sources creating the rhythmic sound of the album Trans-Europe Express.

Since 2002, Kraftwerk's live performances have been conducted with the use of virtual technology (i.e. software replicating and replacing original analogue or digital equipment). According to Fritz Hilpert, "the mobility of music technology and the reliability of the notebooks and software have greatly simplified the realization of complex touring setups: we generate all sounds on the laptops in real time and manipulate them with controller maps. It takes almost no time to get our compact stage system set up for performance. [...] This way, we can bring our Kling-Klang Studio with us on stage. The physical light weight of our equipment also translates into an enormous ease of use when working with software synthesizers and sound processors. Every tool imaginable is within immediate reach or just a few mouse clicks away on the Internet."

=== Reclusiveness and eccentricity ===
The band is also known for being notoriously reclusive, providing rare and enigmatic interviews, using life-size mannequins and robots while conducting official photo shoots, refusing to answer fanmail and barring visitors from the Kling Klang Studio, the precise location of which it used to keep secret.

Another notable example of this eccentric behavior was reported to Johnny Marr of the Smiths by Karl Bartos, who explained that anyone trying to contact the band for collaboration would be told the studio telephone did not have a ringer since, while recording, the band did not like to hear any kind of noise pollution. Instead, callers were instructed to phone the studio precisely at a certain time, whereupon the phone would be answered by Ralf Hütter, despite never hearing the phone ring.

Chris Martin of Coldplay recalled in a 2007 article in Q magazine the process of requesting permission to use the melody from the track "Computer Love" on "Talk" from the album X&Y. He sent a letter through the lawyers of the respective parties and several weeks later received an envelope containing a handwritten reply that simply said "yes".

== Influence and legacy ==
According to music journalist Neil McCormick, Kraftwerk might be "the most influential group in pop history". NME wrote: "'The Beatles and Kraftwerk' may not have the ring of 'the Beatles and the Stones', but nonetheless, these are the two most important bands in music history". AllMusic wrote that their music "resonates in virtually every new development to impact the contemporary pop scene of the late 20th century". Kraftwerk's musical style and image can be heard and seen in 1980s synth-pop groups such as Gary Numan, Ultravox, John Foxx, Visage, Simple Minds, The Human League, Soft Cell, and Yellow Magic Orchestra. Depeche Mode's composer Martin Gore said: "For anyone of our generation involved in electronic music, Kraftwerk were the godfathers". Daniel Miller, founder of Mute Records, purchased the vocoder used by Kraftwerk in their early albums, comparing it to owning "the guitar Jimi Hendrix used on 'Purple Haze'". Andy McCluskey and Paul Humphreys, founding members of Orchestral Manoeuvres in the Dark (OMD), have stated that Kraftwerk was a major reference on their early work; OMD covered "Neon Lights" on its 1991 album Sugar Tax.

Kraftwerk influenced other forms of music such as hip-hop, house, and drum and bass, and they are also regarded as one of the pioneers of the electro genre. Karl Hyde of Underworld has referenced Kraftwerk as a prominent influence. Most notably, "Trans Europe Express" and "Numbers" were interpolated into "Planet Rock" by Afrika Bambaataa & the Soul Sonic Force, one of the earliest hip-hop/electro hits. Kraftwerk helped ignite the New York electro-movement. Techno was created by three musicians from Detroit, often referred to as the 'Belleville three' (Juan Atkins, Kevin Saunderson & Derrick May), who fused the repetitive melodies of Kraftwerk with funk rhythms. The Belleville three were heavily influenced by Kraftwerk and its sounds because Kraftwerk's sounds appealed to the middle-class Black people residing in Detroit at this time.

The electronic band Ladytron was inspired by Kraftwerk's song "The Model" when they composed their debut single "He Took Her to a Movie". Aphex Twin noted Kraftwerk as one of his biggest influences and cited Computer World as a very influential album towards his music and sound. Björk has cited the band as one of her main musical influences. Electronic musician Kompressor has cited Kraftwerk as an influence. The band was also mentioned in the song "Rappers We Crush" by Kompressor and MC Frontalot ("I hurry away, get in my Chrysler. Oh, the dismay!/Someone's replaced all of my Backstreet Boys with Kraftwerk tapes!"). Dr. Alex Paterson of the Orb listed The Man-Machine as one of his 13 favourite albums of all time. According to NME, Kraftwerk's pioneering "robot pop" also spawned groups like The Prodigy and Daft Punk.

Kraftwerk inspired many acts from other styles and genres, along with having their work been repeatedly sampled. David Bowie's "V-2 Schneider", from the 1977's "Heroes" album, was a tribute to Florian Schneider. Post-punk bands Joy Division and New Order were heavily influenced by the band. Joy Division frontman Ian Curtis was a fan, and showed his colleagues records that would influence their music. New Order also sampled "Uranium" in its biggest hit "Blue Monday". Siouxsie and the Banshees recorded a cover of "Hall of Mirrors" on their 1987 album Through the Looking Glass, which was lauded by Ralf Hütter: "In general, we consider cover versions as an appreciation of our work. The version of 'Hall of Mirrors' by Siouxsie and the Banshees is extraordinary, just like the arrangements of Alexander Bălănescu for his Balanescu Quartet release [of Possessed, 1992]. We also like the album El Baile Alemán of Señor Coconut a lot." Members of Blondie have admitted on several occasions that Kraftwerk were an important reference for their sound by the time they were working on their third album Parallel Lines. The worldwide hit "Heart of Glass" turned radically from an initial reggae-flavoured style to its distinctive electronic sound in order to imitate the technological approach of Kraftwerk's albums and adapt it to a disco concept. Simple Minds and U2 each recorded cover versions of "Neon Lights"; Simple Minds' version was included on their 2001 all-covers album Neon Lights, and U2 included "Neon Lights" as the B-side of their 2004 single "Vertigo". LCD Soundsystem's "Get Innocuous!" is built on a sample of "The Robots". Rammstein covered Kraftwerk's song "Das Modell", releasing it as a non-album single in 1997. John Frusciante cited the group's ability to experiment as an inspiration when working in a recording studio.

In 1989, a sped up version of Kraftwerk's song "Electric Café" began appearing as the theme song for a series of sketches on Saturday Night Live called "Sprockets", a German television spoof by Mike Myers. A 1996 episode of sitcom Father Ted briefly featured a live musical performance by "Fr. Tiernan, Fr. Rafter, Fr. Cafferty and Fr. Leonard", whose music and stage presence are heavily inspired by Kraftwerk. The 1998 comedy The Big Lebowski features a fictional band called Autobahn, a parody of Kraftwerk and their 1974 record Autobahn.

In January 2018, BBC Radio 4 broadcast the 30-minute documentary Kraftwerk: Computer Love, which examined "how Kraftwerk's classic album Computer World has changed people's lives."

In October 2019, Kraftwerk was nominated for induction into the Rock and Roll Hall of Fame for 2020. On 12 May 2021, Kraftwerk were announced as an official inductee into the Hall, for the class of 2021.

== Members ==
=== Current members ===
- Ralf Hütter – lead vocals, vocoder, synthesizers, keyboards (1970–1971, 1971–present); organ, drums, percussion, bass guitar, guitar (1970–1971, 1971–1974)
- Henning Schmitz – sound effects, live keyboards (1991–present)
- Falk Grieffenhagen – live video technician (2013–2022); electronic percussion (2023–present)
- Georg Bongartz – live video technician (2023–present)

=== Former members ===
- Florian Schneider – synthesizers, background vocals, vocoder, computer-generated vocals, acoustic and electronic flute, live saxophone, percussion, electric guitar, violin (1970–2008; died 2020)
- Andreas Hohmann – drums (1970)
- Thomas Lohmann – drums (1970)
- Hans-Günther "Charly" Weiss – drums (1970)
- Peter Schmidt – drums (1970)
- Klaus Dinger – drums (1970, 1971; died 2008)
- Eberhard Kranemann – bass guitar (1970–1971)
- Houschäng Nejadépour – electric guitar (1970–1971)
- Michael Rother – electric guitar (1971)
- Plato Kostic (a.k.a. Plato Riviera) – bass guitar (1973)
- Emil Schult – electric guitar, electric violin (1973)
- Wolfgang Flür – electronic percussion (1973–1990)
- Klaus Röder – electric guitar, electronic violin (1974–1975)
- Karl Bartos – electronic percussion, vocals, live vibraphone, live keyboards (1975–1990)
- Fritz Hilpert – electronic percussion (1990–2022)
- Fernando Abrantes – electronic percussion, synthesizer (1991)
- Stefan Pfaffe – live video technician (2008–2012)

=== Lineups ===
Period	Members	Releases
1970	Florian Schneider – synthesizers, vocoder, computer-generated vocals, acoustic and electronic flute, live saxophone, percussion, electric guitar, violin; Ralf Hütter – vocoder, synthesizers, keyboards	
1970	Florian Schneider – synthesizers, vocoder, computer-generated vocals, acoustic and electronic flute, live saxophone, percussion, electric guitar, violin; Ralf Hütter – vocoder, synthesizers, keyboards; Thomas Lohmann – drums	
1970	Florian Schneider – synthesizers, vocoder, computer-generated vocals, acoustic and electronic flute, live saxophone, percussion, electric guitar, violin; Ralf Hütter – vocoder, synthesizers, keyboards; Andreas Hohmann – drums	Kraftwerk (1970)
1970	Florian Schneider – synthesizers, vocoder, computer-generated vocals, acoustic and electronic flute, live saxophone, percussion, electric guitar, violin; Ralf Hütter – vocoder, synthesizers, keyboards; Hans-Günther "Charly" Weiss – drums; Klaus Dinger – drums	Kraftwerk (1970)
1970	Florian Schneider – synthesizers, vocoder, computer-generated vocals, acoustic and electronic flute, live saxophone, percussion, electric guitar, violin; Ralf Hütter – vocoder, synthesizers, keyboards; Klaus Dinger – drums; Peter Schmidt – drums; Houschäng Nejadépour – guitar; Eberhard Kranemann – bass	
1971	Florian Schneider – synthesizers, vocoder, computer-generated vocals, acoustic and electronic flute, live saxophone, percussion, electric guitar, violin; Ralf Hütter – vocoder, synthesizers, keyboards; Houschäng Nejadépour – guitar; Eberhard Kranemann – bass; Michael Rother – guitar	
1971	Florian Schneider – synthesizers, vocoder, computer-generated vocals, acoustic and electronic flute, live saxophone, percussion, electric guitar, violin; Michael Rother – guitar; Klaus Dinger – drums	
1971	Florian Schneider – synthesizers, vocoder, computer-generated vocals, acoustic and electronic flute, live saxophone, percussion, electric guitar, violin; Michael Rother – guitar; Klaus Dinger – drums; Ralf Hütter – vocoder, synthesizers, keyboards	
1971–1973	Florian Schneider – synthesizers, vocoder, computer-generated vocals, acoustic and electronic flute, live saxophone, percussion, electric guitar, violin; Ralf Hütter – vocoder, synthesizers, keyboards	Kraftwerk 2 (1972); Ralf and Florian (1973)
1973	Florian Schneider – synthesizers, background vocals, vocoder, computer-generated vocals, acoustic and electronic flute, live saxophone, percussion; Ralf Hütter – lead vocals, vocoder, synthesizers, keyboards; Emil Schult – electric guitar, electronic violin	
1973	Florian Schneider – synthesizers, background vocals, vocoder, computer-generated vocals, acoustic and electronic flute, live saxophone, percussion; Ralf Hütter – lead vocals, vocoder, synthesizers, keyboards; Emil Schult – electric guitar, electronic violin; Plato Kostic – bass guitar	
1973	Florian Schneider – synthesizers, background vocals, vocoder, computer-generated vocals, acoustic and electronic flute, live saxophone, percussion; Ralf Hütter – lead vocals, vocoder, synthesizers, keyboards; Emil Schult – electric guitar, electronic violin	
1973	Florian Schneider – synthesizers, background vocals, vocoder, computer-generated vocals, acoustic and electronic flute, live saxophone, percussion; Ralf Hütter – lead vocals, vocoder, synthesizers, keyboards; Emil Schult – electric guitar, electronic violin; Wolfgang Flür – electronic percussion	
1974	Florian Schneider – synthesizers, background vocals, vocoder, computer-generated vocals, acoustic and electronic flute, live saxophone, percussion; Ralf Hütter – lead vocals, vocoder, synthesizers, keyboards; Wolfgang Flür – electronic percussion	
1974–1975	Florian Schneider – synthesizers, background vocals, vocoder, computer-generated vocals, acoustic and electronic flute, live saxophone, percussion; Ralf Hütter – lead vocals, vocoder, synthesizers, keyboards; Wolfgang Flür – electronic percussion; Klaus Röder – electric guitar, electronic violin	Autobahn (1974)
1975–1990	Florian Schneider – synthesizers, background vocals, vocoder, computer-generated vocals, acoustic and electronic flute, live saxophone, percussion; Ralf Hütter – lead vocals, vocoder, synthesizers, keyboards; Wolfgang Flür – electronic percussion; Karl Bartos – electronic percussion, vocals, live vibraphone, live keyboards	Radio-Activity (1975); Trans-Europe Express (1977); The Man-Machine (1978); Computer World (1981); Electric Café (1986)
1990	Florian Schneider – synthesizers, background vocals, vocoder, computer-generated vocals, acoustic and electronic flute, live saxophone, percussion; Ralf Hütter – lead vocals, vocoder, synthesizers, keyboards; Karl Bartos – electronic percussion, vocals, live vibraphone, live keyboards; Fritz Hilpert – electronic percussion	The Mix (1991)
1990–1991	Florian Schneider – synthesizers, background vocals, vocoder, computer-generated vocals, acoustic and electronic flute, live saxophone, percussion; Ralf Hütter – lead vocals, vocoder, synthesizers, keyboards; Fritz Hilpert – electronic percussion; Fernando Abrantes – electronic percussion, synthesizer	
1991–2008	Florian Schneider – synthesizers, background vocals, vocoder, computer-generated vocals, acoustic and electronic flute, live saxophone, percussion; Ralf Hütter – lead vocals, vocoder, synthesizers, keyboards; Fritz Hilpert – electronic percussion; Henning Schmitz – sound effects, live keyboards	Tour de France Soundtracks (2003)
2008–2013	Ralf Hütter – lead vocals, vocoder, synthesizers, keyboards; Fritz Hilpert – electronic percussion; Henning Schmitz – sound effects, live keyboards; Stefan Pfaffe – live video technician	
2013–2023	Ralf Hütter – lead vocals, vocoder, synthesizers, keyboards; Fritz Hilpert – electronic percussion; Henning Schmitz – sound effects, live keyboards; Falk Grieffenhagen – live video technician	
2023–present	Ralf Hütter – lead vocals, vocoder, synthesizers, keyboards; Henning Schmitz – sound effects, live keyboards; Falk Grieffenhagen – electronic percussion; Georg Bongartz – live video technician	

== Discography ==
Studio albums

- Kraftwerk (1970)
- Kraftwerk 2 (1972)
- Ralf & Florian (1973)
- Autobahn (1974)
- Radio-Activity (1975)
- Trans Europe Express (1977)
- The Man-Machine (1978)
- Computer World (1981)
- Electric Café (1986)
- The Mix (1991)
- Tour de France Soundtracks (2003)

== Videography ==
- Minimum-Maximum (2005)
- 3-D The Catalogue (2017)
- 3-D Der Katalog (2017)

== Awards and achievements ==
=== Grammy Awards ===
Year	Nominee / work	Award	Result
1982	"Computer World"	Best Rock Instrumental Performance	Nominated
2006	Minimum-Maximum	Best Dance/Electronic Album	Nominated
2014	Kraftwerk	Lifetime Achievement Award	Won
2015	Autobahn	Hall of Fame	Won
2018	3-D The Catalogue	Best Dance/Electronic Album	Won
2018	3-D The Catalogue	Best Surround Sound Album	Nominated

== See also ==
- Grammy Award recipients for Best Dance/Electronic Album
- List of ambient music artists
- List of Rock and Roll Hall of Fame inductees

== Sources ==
- Bussy, Pascal (1993). Kraftwerk—Man, Machine & Music. SAF Publishing. ISBN 978-0-946719-70-9.
- Flür, Wolfgang (2001). "Kraftwerk": I Was A Robot. Sanctuary Publishing. ISBN 978-1-86074-417-4.

== Further reading. ==
- Barr, Tim (1998), Kraftwerk: from Düsseldorf to the future (with love), Ebury Press, ISBN 9780091864903.
- Neri, Vanni; Campani, Giorgio (2000), A Short Introduction to Kraftwerk, Nuovi Equilibri, ISBN 9788872265734.
- Koch, Albert (2002), Kraftwerk, Hannibal, ISBN 9783854452133.
- Kraftwerk (2005), Minimum-Maximum. (88-page book included in the Minimum-Maximum Notebook set)
- Albiez, Sean; Pattie, David (2010), Kraftwerk: Music Non-Stop, ISBN 9781441189677.
- Buckley, David (2012), Kraftwerk: Publikation, ISBN 9781468312225.
- Mott, Toby (2012), Kraftwerk: 45 RPM, Vinyl Factory, ISBN 9780957391406.
- "Kraftwerk sue makers of Kraftwerk charging devices", The Guardian, 10 March 2015.

Awards and achievements
Preceded by Glenn Gould, Charlie Haden, Lightnin' Hopkins, Carole King, Patti Page, Ravi Shankar, The Temptations	Grammy Lifetime Achievement Award; 2014; With: The Beatles, Clifton Chenier, The Isley Brothers, Kris Kristofferson, Armando Manzanero	Succeeded by The Bee Gees, Pierre Boulez, Buddy Guy, George Harrison, Flaco Jiménez, The Louvin Brothers, Wayne Shorter
