= (Forever) Live and Die =

Single by Orchestral Manoeuvres in the Dark

from the album The Pacific Age
- B-side: "This Town"
- Released: 26 August 1986
- Studio: Studio De La Grande Armée (Paris)
- Length: 3:38
- Label: Virgin
- Songwriters: Paul Humphreys; Graham Weir; Neil Weir
- Producer: Stephen Hague

Orchestral Manoeuvres in the Dark singles chronology
"If You Leave" (1986)	"(Forever) Live and Die" (1986)	"We Love You" (1986)

Music video
- "(Forever) Live and Die" on YouTube

"(Forever) Live and Die" is a song by the English electronic band Orchestral Manoeuvres in the Dark (OMD), released as the first single from their seventh studio album, The Pacific Age (1986). Paul Humphreys sings lead vocals on the track. The single peaked at No. 11 on the UK singles chart and entered the top 10 in Canada and several European countries.

== Critical reception and legacy ==
Lynden Barber of The Sydney Morning Herald wrote that "(Forever) Live and Die" is "almost worthy of prime period ABBA, its ethereal Euro synthetics melting around a chorus that ascends towards heaven." Billboard selected the single as one of their "pop picks" for the week of 20 September, adding that it "achieves [the Beatles'] Magical Mystery Tour spirit with '80s tech". Record Mirror's Andy Strickland referred to "an infectious little beast" with "some nice brass touches". Conversely, Simon Mills of Smash Hits portrayed the song as "limp, languid, wimpy and totally inoffensive".

In April 1987, English disc jockey (DJ) Gary Crowley identified "(Forever) Live and Die" as a "great single" and "one of [his] favourite records of the last twelve months". In a later article, Spin's James Hunter observed "the kind of emotionally transcendent dancepop [Pet Shop Boys'] Neil Tennant always strove for, an unqualified masterpiece of tears and aural compression, carnivalesque synth figures and Wednesday afternoon blues." Stewart Mason of AllMusic wrote that it "sounds oddly unfinished, albeit pleasant enough". Barenaked Ladies' drummer Tyler Stewart named the track as his favourite of OMD's, saying, "I really love '(Forever) Live and Die'. That's a great song."

"(Forever) Live and Die" has been listed among the best tracks of 1986. The Pueblo Chieftain's Jon Pompia named the "wonderful" song as one of the 10 greatest of the 1980s; it has also appeared in "all-time" lists compiled by CFNY-FM and Q101.

== Track listings ==
7-inch and 7-inch picture disc

1. "(Forever) Live and Die" – 3:36
2. "This Town" – 3:44

First 12-inch

1. "(Forever) Live and Die" (John "Tokes" Potoker – extended mix) – 5:45
2. "(Forever) Live and Die" (7-inch version) – 3:36
3. "This Town" – 3:44

Second 12-inch

1. "(Forever) Live and Die" (Tom Lord-Alge – extended remix) – 5:50
2. "(Forever) Live and Die" (7-inch version) – 3:36
3. "This Town" – 3:44

== Charts ==
=== Weekly charts ===
Chart (1986–1987)	Peak position
Australia (Kent Music Report)	19
Austria (Ö3 Austria Top 40)	5
Belgium (Ultratop 50 Flanders)	6
Canada Top Singles (RPM)	10
Europe (European Hot 100 Singles)	7
Ireland (IRMA)	13
Netherlands (Dutch Top 40)	3
Netherlands (Single Top 100)	5
New Zealand (Recorded Music NZ)	14
South Africa (Springbok Radio)	12
Switzerland (Schweizer Hitparade)	9
UK Singles (Official Charts)	11
US Billboard Hot 100	19
US 12-inch Singles Sales (Billboard)	37
US Adult Contemporary (Billboard)	25
US Cash Box Top 100	22
West Germany (GfK)	8

=== Year-end charts ===
Chart (1986)	Position
Belgium (Ultratop 50 Flanders)	25
Canada Top Singles (RPM)	96
Europe (European Hot 100 Singles)	80
Netherlands (Dutch Top 40)	30
Netherlands (Single Top 100)	21

Chart (1987)	Position
Austria (Ö3 Austria Top 40)	25
