= Dreaming (Orchestral Manoeuvres in the Dark song) =

Single by Orchestral Manoeuvres in the Dark

from the album The Best of OMD
- B-side: "Satellite"; "Gravity Never Failed"
- Released: 25 January 1988
- Recorded: 1987
- Genre: Synth-pop; new wave
- Length: 3:54; 6:26 (Extended version)
- Label: Virgin
- Songwriters: Humphreys, McCluskey
- Producer: OMD

Orchestral Manoeuvres in the Dark singles chronology
| "Shame" (1987) | "Dreaming" (1988) | "Brides of Frankenstein" (1988) |

Music video
- "Dreaming" on YouTube

"Dreaming" is a song by the English electronic band Orchestral Manoeuvres in the Dark (OMD), initially released in January 1988 as a single from their compilation album The Best of OMD.

It was a hit in the United States, reaching number 16 on the Billboard Hot 100, number 17 on the Cash Box Top 100 and number six on the Dance chart. The track had limited success in the band's home country where it peaked at number 50 on the UK Singles Chart, while it entered the Top 40 in several other countries including Australia, New Zealand and West Germany. The single was re-released in the UK on 6 June 1988 in new 7" gatefold and CD single as well as 12" formats, reaching this time number 60 on the national chart.

The cover art was designed by Stylorouge, with photography by Andrew Catlin.

Until OMD's reformation in 2010, "Dreaming" was the last single to feature the group's original line-up; lead singer Andy McCluskey was the only core member to appear on their 1991–1996 output. McCluskey performed the song live during the 1990s when co-founder Paul Humphreys was no longer in the group.

== Critical reception ==
Stewart Mason, in a retrospective review for AllMusic, described the song as "dynamite", and wrote: "['Dreaming'] is easily the group's best single since 1983's 'Telegraph'... It's a near-perfect pop song, perhaps the last great single by an '80s synth-pop band." Classic Pop's Mark Lindores called it a "massively underrated OMD anthem".

McCluskey and Humphreys had a shared dislike of "Dreaming" for many years; McCluskey once said that he regretted releasing the track. In 2024, however, Humphreys stated that he and McCluskey had come to regard it as a "really good song", while attributing their earlier distaste for the track to circumstances surrounding its recording.

"Dreaming" has appeared in rankings of the best songs of 1988, and of all time. (Note: See:)

== B-sides ==
All the single versions include "Satellite" as a B-side. The other B-side, "Gravity Never Failed", was a bonus track on the 12" and CD single. This song was originally titled "Georgia" and dates back to the 1981 Architecture & Morality sessions. However, the band lost their favour with the song at the time and it was thus shelved, and the title "Georgia" was given to a new song featured on the album. "Gravity Never Failed" has subsequently been included on CD re-issues of the Architecture & Morality album (2003 & 2007), as well as on the Navigation: The OMD B-Sides compilation album, unlike "Satellite", which remains unique to this release.

== Track listing ==
- 7" vinyl (UK, Virgin)
1. "Dreaming" – 4:00
2. "Satellite" – 5:10
- 12" vinyl/12" picture disc (UK, Virgin)
1. "Dreaming (Extended Mix)" – 6:25
2. "Satellite" – 5:10
3. "Gravity Never Failed"
- 10" vinyl (Special Limited Edition) (UK, Virgin)
1. "Dreaming (The William Orbit Remix)" – 7:15
2. "Dreaming (7" version)" – 3:56
3. "Messages" – 4:41
4. "Secret" – 3:57
- CD/Mini-CD (UK, Virgin)
1. "Dreaming (Extended Mix)" – 6:25
2. "Satellite" – 5:10
3. "Gravity Never Failed" – 3:24
4. "Dreaming (7" version)" – 4:00
- 7" vinyl AM-03002 (US, A&M)
1. "Dreaming" – 3:54
2. "Satellite" – 5:10
- 12" vinyl SP 0-12258 (US, A&M)
1. "Dreaming (Club Mix)" – 7:13
2. "Dreaming (Radio Edit)" - 3:54
3. "Dreaming (Dub Mix)" - 4:29
4. "Satellite" – 5:10
- Mini-CD single Gatefold CSIG 000051 2 (US, A&M)
1. "Dreaming" – 4:00
2. "Gravity Never Failed" – 3:27
3. "Secret (12" Mix) - 6:15
- CD promo (US, A&M)
1. "Dreaming (Club Mix Edit)" – 4:58
2. "Dreaming (7" Version)" - 3:54
3. "Dreaming (Extended 12" Club Mix)" – 8:22
- 12" vinyl (Virgin, Europe)
1. "Dreaming (12" USA Club Mix)" – 7:13
2. "Dreaming (Radio USA Mix)" – 3:50

=== Official versions ===
| Version | Length | Remixed by | Comment |
|---|---|---|---|
| Radio Edit/7" Version | 4:00 | Tom Lord-Alge | Same as Album version |
| Extended Mix | 6:19 | Tom Lord-Alge | |
| The William Orbit Remix | 7:15 | William Orbit | Special Limited Edition 10" (UK) |
| Extended 12" Club Mix | 8:22 | Bruce Forest and Frank Heller | US 12" Promo |
| Club Mix Edit | 4:58 | Bruce Forest and Frank Heller | US 12" Promo |
| Club Mix | 7:13 | Bruce Forest and Frank Heller | also known as 12" USA Club Mix |
| Dub Mix | 4:29 | Bruce Forest and Frank Heller | |
| Radio USA Mix | 3:50 | Bruce Forest and Frank Heller | |

== Charts ==
| Chart (1988) | Peak position |
|---|---|
| Australia (Kent Music Report) | 33 |
| Belgium (Ultratop 50 Flanders) | 26 |
| New Zealand (Recorded Music NZ) | 37 |
| UK Singles (Official Charts) | 50 |
| US Billboard Hot 100 | 16 |
| US Dance Club Songs (Billboard) | 6 |
| US Dance Singles Sales (Billboard) | 17 |
| US Cash Box Top 100 | 17 |
| West Germany (GfK) | 26 |
