= The Pacific Age =

Studio album by Orchestral Manoeuvres in the Dark
- Released: 29 September 1986
- Recorded: 1985–1986
- Studios: Studio de la Grande Armée (Paris); Amazon (Liverpool)
- Genres: Synth-pop; synth-rock; sophisti-pop
- Length: 40:18
- Labels: Virgin; A&M
- Producer: Stephen Hague

Orchestral Manoeuvres in the Dark chronology
Crush (1985)	The Pacific Age (1986)	The Best of OMD (1988)

Singles from The Pacific Age
- 1. "(Forever) Live and Die" Released: 26 August 1986; 2. "We Love You" Released: 3 November 1986; 3. "Shame" Released: 13 April 1987

The Pacific Age is the seventh studio album by the English electronic band Orchestral Manoeuvres in the Dark (OMD), released on 29 September 1986 by Virgin Records. It was the last of two OMD studio albums produced by Stephen Hague, after Crush (1985). The record exhibits the same refined production values as its predecessor while venturing into the realm of mid-1980s sophisti-pop, retreating further from the group's experimental beginnings.

Working under increasing record label pressure and weathering a creative drought, the band committed each new song to the album with limited deliberation. The Pacific Age met with largely negative reviews, but has received some favourable attention in retrospective album listings. It was a Top 20 entry in the UK, Canada and New Zealand, as well as in multiple European countries. Lead single "(Forever) Live and Die" became the group's second Top 20 hit in the US.

Recording sessions for The Pacific Age were fraught with conflict and debauchery. It would be the last OMD studio album for five years, and the last to feature co-founder Paul Humphreys until 2010's History of Modern. The record is held in low esteem by OMD, with frontman Andy McCluskey calling it the band's "musical nadir".

== Background ==
Despite the gruelling recording and promotion schedule for predecessor Crush (1985), OMD's American label, A&M Records, wanted a new studio album as soon as possible in order to capitalise on the success of 1986 hit single "If You Leave" (from the John Hughes film Pretty in Pink). Afforded only two months to write a record, the band continued their focus on breaking the US market with more accessible pop material, while restricting the experimental tendencies of their earlier work. The group again collaborated with producer Stephen Hague, albeit with the addition of his engineer, Tom Lord-Alge. This ensemble worked out of Studio de la Grande Armée in Paris, building upon the band's earlier recordings at Liverpool's Amazon Studios.

OMD committed each new song to The Pacific Age with limited deliberation, while relying on some recent compositions for other projects. "We Love You" had been written for the film Playing for Keeps (1986). "Goddess of Love" was the group's original contribution to Pretty in Pink, but a rewrite of the film's climax rendered the track unsuitable (hence the creation of "If You Leave"). The band reworked the song for inclusion on the album, including rewriting the lyric. One older track, "Southern" (which sampled Martin Luther King Jr.'s final speech in 1968), was included after failing to make the cut for Crush. Despite A&M's wishes, the group neglected to include "If You Leave" on the record.

"Flame of Hope" uses Japanese TV commercial samples left over from the making of the Crush title track. "The Pacific Age" itself was based on the rising prominence of East Asia in world economics. The songs "Cajun Moon" and "Cut Me Down" were almost featured, but according to McCluskey, "democracy won out". Both songs were later included on the band's 40th anniversary retrospective box set, Souvenir (2019), which carries a CD of unreleased tracks. 1983 holdover "Heaven Is" was nudged off The Pacific Age in favour of "Flame of Hope", but the track eventually surfaced on 1993's Liberator. Humphreys recalled trying to compose satisfactory material amid a creative drought, saying, "It felt incredibly rushed... we'd run out of ideas; there were no songs left in the well." Sessions were marred by exhaustion, internal conflicts, and excessive consumption of drugs and alcohol.

For the first time, brothers Graham and Neil Weir were formally credited as members of OMD; "Shame" was born out of Graham's desire to add a "soulful" element to the album. The Weirs had been involved with the band as session musicians since the re-recording of "Julia's Song" in 1984 (a "Talking Loud and Clear" single B-side), and were credited as "also playing" musicians on Crush. The Pacific Age features various session players, including guitarist Kamil Rustam and backing vocalist Carole Fredericks.

The group intended to release "Stay (The Black Rose and the Universal Wheel)" as the first single, but Virgin pushed for "Shame" instead; "(Forever) Live and Die" was ultimately the first release. "We Love You" was issued as the second single. Virgin then scheduled "Shame" as the next single to the surprise of the band, who were on tour at the time.

== Artwork ==
OMD intended to hire Peter Saville as the cover artist, given his contributions to many of the band's earlier artworks. However, Saville's later successes in designing covers for major acts like Peter Gabriel, the Rolling Stones and Wham!, had pushed his asking price beyond OMD's budget. Graphic designer Mick Haggerty had recently returned from Mexico, where he had created various woodblock prints for a publishing company. He was enlisted to apply the same techniques to the Pacific Age cover, whose design was hand-chiselled from a piece of wood. To enhance the notion of a hand-made texture, the artwork was printed on the reverse of the sleeve so that the coarse, unvarnished side was facing outward.

== Critical reception ==
Professional ratings
Review scores
Source	Rating
AllMusic	2.5/5 stars
The Brandon Sun	C+
Encyclopedia of Eighties Music	2/5 stars
MusicHound	3/5 stars
Number One	3/5 stars
Record Mirror	2/5 stars
Smash Hits	3/10
Sounds	2/5 stars
Times Colonist	3.5/5 stars
Winnipeg Free Press	3.5/4 stars

The Pacific Age met with largely unfavourable reviews. Robin Smith of Record Mirror wrote, "The Pacific Age is a very flatulent album. It's difficult to digest and burps into life only occasionally. The most palatable songs, like '(Forever) Live and Die' and 'Shame', are surrounded by others that move with the grace of Tina Turner trying to dance in a pair of lead-filled wellies." Smash Hits journalist Nick Kelly observed only "a couple of subversive melodies" among a "morass of passionless synth-rock ditties" and "characterless elevator 'musak'." Melody Maker described the record as "wheezing, crumpled and limp" and "a bitter, bitter disappointment". Paul Simper of Number One was more favourable, allowing that "the music – if not fire incarnate – has at least a warm glow".

Los Angeles Times critic Steve Pond deemed the album to be "bloated" with "unnecessary pomp", and suggested that OMD find "a middle ground between what it used to be and what it's become". Michael T. Lyttle of the Austin American-Statesman called the record "confusing and disappointing", adding that "[Stephen] Hague's labor on The Pacific Age can't bail out sub-par material. Look for no miracles here." On the other hand, Winnipeg Free Press journalist Glen Gore-Smith found OMD to be "in fine form... adding low-tech elements to its sound, while maintaining the exquisite precision of its ethereal synthpop style." Tom Lanham of the San Francisco Examiner identified the album as OMD's most cohesive since Architecture & Morality (1981), observing an "almost magical" rapport between McCluskey and Humphreys. He added, "Each track contains a palatable pop hook cleverly woven into its memorable framework. Potential hits abound."

In a retrospective review, Trouser Press described The Pacific Age as "tiresomely ponderous and self-important", concluding, "Except for the smoothly contrived hit '(Forever) Live and Die' and the catchy 'We Love You', this dilettantish mess is less a set of songs than a meaningless collection of sounds." Classic Pop's Mark Lindores said, "The Pacific Age all but wipes out OMD's original identity, stripping it of everything that made them unique – an unfortunate turn of events for an act that previously had been ahead of the curve... As an album closer, 'Watch Us Fall' could not have been more apt." A more forgiving Dave Connolly of AllMusic wrote, "It's true that tracks like '(Forever) Live and Die', 'Shame', and 'Goddess of Love' are more style than substance, but it's a style that plays to OMD's mastery of melody and mood... The band also continues to string snippets of sound together to create interesting patterns."

== Legacy ==
Morale issues that arose during the onerous recording and promotion of predecessor Crush (1985), intensified during the making of The Pacific Age. Creative conflicts also came to the fore. These issues preceded a line-up split in the late 1980s; co-founder Humphreys would not appear on another OMD studio album until the group's post-reunion release, History of Modern (2010).

Since the end of 1986, The Pacific Age has received some favourable attention in various album listings. The Gavin Report placed the record at no. 90 in its "Alternative Top 100" of that year. StarPhoenix critic Terry Craig named The Pacific Age one of the 10 best albums of 1986, as did CFNY-FM listeners. In May 1987, the Los Angeles Times called it one of the five best digitally-recorded CD albums on the market, praising its "dazzling brightness". Slicing Up Eyeballs readers later voted The Pacific Age as the 46th-greatest record of 1986, while Diffuser.fm staff ranked it the 38th-best alternative album of the year. It was placed at no. 672 in CMJ's "Top 1000, 1979–1989".

Billy Manes of Orlando Weekly felt the record an "underrated opus". Author Anna Smaill cited The Pacific Age – in particular the track "The Dead Girls" – as an influence on her 2015 novel, The Chimes.

== Band response ==
McCluskey discussed the album in the 2014 book, Mad World: An Oral History of New Wave Artists and Songs That Defined the 1980s:

"The Pacific Age is our musical nadir. That was the one where we were writing songs because we had to make an album. We were going round and round America in buses for months on end, and the record company said, 'It would be great if we had a new album for Christmas.' We were on the treadmill. We were going back to an empty well. We were exactly the sort of band we promised we never would be. There were no concepts, no weird ideas, no 'Enola Gay'... I was dragging out lyrics that I would have been appalled by 10 years earlier."

McCluskey feels that the record's production "just doesn't sound like [OMD]", and has noted that it features tracks he wishes the band had never released. Humphreys stated, "There were a couple of nice things on it, but to us, overall, it didn't work." He pointed to "surrounding circumstances, the time factor and conflicts that were going on".

== Track listing ==
- All songs by OMD, as per label.
- Writing credits below as per ASCAP database.

Side one
No.	Title	Writer(s)	Length
1.	"Stay (The Black Rose and the Universal Wheel)"	Paul Humphreys; Andy McCluskey	4:22
2.	"(Forever) Live and Die"	Humphreys; Graham Weir; Neil Weir	3:38
3.	"The Pacific Age"	Humphreys; McCluskey	3:59
4.	"The Dead Girls"	Humphreys; McCluskey	4:48
5.	"Shame"	Humphreys; McCluskey; Weir; Weir	4:15

Side two
No.	Title	Writer(s)	Length
6.	"Southern"	Humphreys; McCluskey; Weir; Weir	3:41
7.	"Flame of Hope"	Humphreys; McCluskey	2:40
8.	"Goddess of Love"	Humphreys; McCluskey	4:30
9.	"We Love You"	Humphreys; McCluskey; Stephen Hague	4:10
10.	"Watch Us Fall"	Humphreys; McCluskey; Hague	4:11
Total length:			40:18

== Personnel ==
Orchestral Manoeuvres in the Dark (OMD)

- Paul Humphreys – keyboards, percussion, vocals
- Andy McCluskey – vocals, keyboards, bass guitar
- Malcolm Holmes – drums, percussion
- Martin Cooper – keyboards, saxophone
- Graham Weir – trombone, keyboards, guitar
- Neil Weir – trumpet, bass

Additional musicians

- Stephen Hague – additional keyboards, guitar
- Kamil Rustam – guitar
- Carole Fredericks – backing vocals
- Aliss Terrell – backing vocals
- Yvonne Jones – backing vocals

== Charts ==
=== Weekly charts ===
Weekly chart performance for The Pacific Age
Chart (1986)	Peak position
Australian Albums (Kent Music Report)	36
Canada Top Albums/CDs (RPM)	18
Dutch Albums (Album Top 100)	17
European Albums (Music & Media)	20
German Albums (Offizielle Top 100)	15
New Zealand Albums (RMNZ)	14
Swiss Albums (Schweizer Hitparade)	20
UK Albums (Official Charts)	15
US Billboard 200	47

=== Year-end charts ===
Year-end chart performance for The Pacific Age
Chart (1986)	Position
Canada Top Albums/CDs (RPM)	100

== Certifications ==
Certifications for The Pacific Age
Region	Certification	Certified units/sales
Canada (Music Canada)	Platinum	100,000^{^}
United Kingdom (BPI)	Silver	60,000^{^}
^{^} Shipments figures based on certification alone.
