= Call My Name (Orchestral Manoeuvres in the Dark song) =

1991 single by Orchestral Manoeuvres in the Dark

Single by Orchestral Manoeuvres in the Dark

from the album Sugar Tax
- B-side: "Walk Tall"; "Brides of Frankenstein"
- Released: 18 November 1991
- Genre: Dance
- Length: 4:15 (album version); 4:23 (remix)
- Label: Virgin
- Songwriters: OMD; Stuart Kershaw; Lloyd Massett
- Producer: Andy Richards

Orchestral Manoeuvres in the Dark singles chronology
"Then You Turn Away" (1991)	"Call My Name" (1991)	"Stand Above Me" (1993)

Music video
- "Call My Name" on YouTube

"Call My Name" is a song by the English electronic band Orchestral Manoeuvres in the Dark (OMD). Remixed for its single release, it was issued as the fourth and final single from the group's eighth studio album, Sugar Tax (1991), on 18 November 1991 by Virgin Records. The single peaked at number 50 on the UK Singles Chart The B-side to the 7-inch single, "Walk Tall" is featured as the tenth track on Sugar Tax. An extended remix version was also released on the CD and 12-inch issues, featuring an uncredited female voice speaking over a telephone and the sounds of a rotary telephone dial.

== Reception ==
Upon its release, Steve Lamacq, writing for NME, considered "Call My Name" to be "one of the crap tracks from Sugar Tax" and added that the 12-inch version "is not a million light years away from a Star Wars effect tape". On the other hand, KROQ included the track in its "Top 106.7 Songs of 1991". In a retrospective article, AllMusic critic Dave Thompson wrote of the track's "musical splendor", calling it a "dance-fired extravaganza with a melody that's as memorable as the beats are incendiary."

== Track listings ==
All songs were written by McCluskey/Kershaw/Massett.

7-inch: Virgin / VS 1380 (UK)

1. "Call My Name" (remix) – 4:23
2. "Walk Tall" – 3:55
- also available on cassette (Virgin / VSC 1380)

12-inch: Virgin / VST 1380 (UK)

1. "Call My Name" (12-inch version)
2. "Brides of Frankenstein" (The Hitman & Silk Mega Mix)

CD: Virgin / VSCDT 1380 (UK)

1. "Call My Name" (remix)
2. "Call My Name" (12-inch version)
3. "Brides of Frankenstein" (The Hitman & Silk Mega Mix)
4. "Brides of Frankenstein" (dub)
- "Call My Name" mixes done by Mark McGuire
- "Brides of Frankenstein" mixes done by Mike "Hitman" Wilson and Steve "Silk" Hurley

== Charts ==
Chart (1991–1992)	Peak position
Austria (Ö3 Austria Top 40)	24
Europe (Eurochart Hot 100)	95
Germany (GfK)	28
Switzerland (Schweizer Hitparade)	28
UK Singles (Official Charts)	50
UK Airplay (Music Week)	25
