= We Love You (Orchestral Manoeuvres in the Dark song) =

1986 single by Orchestral Manoeuvres in the Dark

Single by Orchestral Manoeuvres in the Dark

from the album The Pacific Age
- B-side: "We Love You" (dub)
- Released: 3 November 1986
- Recorded: Studio de la Grande Armée (Paris, France)
- Length: 4:10
- Label: Virgin
- Songwriters: Paul Humphreys; Andy McCluskey; Stephen Hague
- Producer: Stephen Hague

Orchestral Manoeuvres in the Dark singles chronology
"(Forever) Live and Die" (1986)	"We Love You" (1986)	"Shame" (1987)

Music video
- "We Love You" on YouTube

"We Love You" is a song by the English electronic band Orchestral Manoeuvres in the Dark (OMD), released as the second single from their seventh studio album, The Pacific Age. It was originally written for the film Playing for Keeps (1986).

== Critical reception ==
"We Love You" was popular among WLIR listeners, who voted it "Screamer of the Week". Following its US-wide release, the track was included in KROQ's "Top 106.7 Songs of 1987". AllMusic critic Dave Thompson later wrote that "We Love You" had "all the makings of a smash [hit]", while praising its instrumentation and "splendidly anthemic chorus". He also observed "barely veiled lyrics with anti-militaristic intent".

== Track listing ==
7-inch

1. "We Love You" – 3:59
2. "We Love You" (dub) – 6:20

Limited edition 2×7-inch

1. "We Love You" – 3:59
2. "We Love You" (dub) – 6:20
3. "If You Leave" – 4:30
4. "88 Seconds in Greensboro" – 4:20

Limited edition 7-inch + Cassette-Maxi Retro

1. "We Love You" – 3:59
2. "We Love You" (dub) – 6:20
3. "Souvenir"
4. "Electricity"
5. "Enola Gay"
6. "Joan of Arc"
7. "We Love You"
8. "We Love You" (dub)

12-inch

1. "We Love You" (extended) – 6:15
2. "We Love You" (7-inch version) – 3:59
3. "We Love You" (dub) – 6:20

== Charts ==
Chart (1986–1987)	Peak position
Australia (Kent Music Report)	18
New Zealand (Recorded Music NZ)	26
UK Singles (Official Charts)	54
US Dance/Disco Club Play (Billboard)	16
