= Godot (band) =

- Origin: England
- Genres: Synthpop, new wave
- Years active: 1980–1982
- Labels: Pinnacle
- Past members: Dave Hughes; Keith Hartley; Ronnie Stone; Steve Byrne; Martin Cooper

Godot was a synthpop band formed in England in November 1980, by Merseyside musicians Dave Hughes on instruments, and Keith Hartley on vocals and instruments.

Hughes and Hartley had relations with the synthpop band Dalek I Love You. The first was a founding member of that band, remaining alongside lead vocalist and guitarist Alan Gill to record their first three singles and the debut album Compass Kumpas, although at the time of the release of the latter disc, he was no longer in Dalek I Love You, working with Orchestral Manoeuvres in the Dark; Keith Hartley was lead singer and guitarist of Radio Blank, formed by him alongside Alan Gill and David Balfe.

Hughes was working with OMD until November 1980 when he quit and, in the same month, formed Godot, alongside Keith Hartley, who, after Radio Blank, was working as fireman. In 1981, they released an EP called Extended Player, whose credits did not indicate a label. However, by that time, Alan Gill was reforming Dalek I Love You, pulling in Hartley to help him (Hartley then joined).

Without Hartley, Hughes recruited new members, Ronnie Stone on guitar, Steve Byrne on lead vocals and Martin Cooper on saxophone. Adding a drummer, they toured with Dalek I Love You in the winter of 1981. However, Stone soon left to join China Crisis, causing Godot to split up.

In August 1982, Pinnacle Records released a single, "Something's Missing", in 7" and 10" versions.

Hughes later went on to work with Games, Freeze Frame, The Lotus Eaters and Thomas Lang.

== Discography ==
- 1981: Extended Player (EP)
- 1982: "Something's Missing" (7"/10") (Pinnacle)
