= Dalek I Love You (disambiguation) =

Dalek I Love You may refer to:

- Dalek I Love You, music group
- Dalek I Love You (album), the group's self-titled album
- Dalek I Love You (radio), BBC Radio audio play
