= Chris Shaw (musician) =

English musician

Chris Shaw, also known as Chris Teepee (a name which originated during his 'Teachers Practice'), is an English musician from Upton on the Wirral. Shaw is a drummer, synthesizer player and guitarist who has played with various Wirral and Liverpool bands during the late 1970s and early 1980s.

His first role as a musician was as founder member of synthpop group Dalek I Love You, formed in 1977 alongside Alan Gill, David Balfe (later with Big in Japan and Teardrop Explodes) and Dave Hughes (later with OMD and Thomas Lang). Shaw played the synthesizer, and became the bands rhythm unit coordinator (drum machines) and 'Tape Man.' He left the band in late 1978, leaving by the time the band signed to Phonogram.

After leaving Dalek I Love You, Shaw formed Some Detergents with schoolfriend Chris Russell and Brendan Coyle, releasing the single "Moderne Problem (TV Times)" on Clean Records. The 7" contained the B-sides "Colors" and "Wake Up". The band were championed by local DJ's John Peel and Janice Long, who interviewed the band on her Sunday night Radio Merseyside show "Street Life," making the single her record of the week.

The band gigged in and around Liverpool – most frequently at the infamous Eric's Club – and also appeared on North West Tonight.

In 1983, Shaw and Russell formed a new band, Sense of Vision, with former Games keyboardist Colin Hughes, and released the double A-side single "Dream" / "Destiny" on 24 January 1984. The single was reviewed by Peter Trollope in his "In The Groove" column in the Liverpool Echo. Trollope wrote, "[...] Of the two tracks Destiny has probably the more commercial hook to it. This single shows they [...] are going to be one to watch out for." Sense of Vision self-released a number of cassette singles throughout 1984 and 1985, but disbanded shortly afterwards.

Chris Shaw lives in Ireland. He made experimental music in the early 2000s.
