= Radio Blank =

- Origin: Thingwall, Metropolitan Borough of Wirral, Merseyside, England
- Genres: Punk, R&B
- Years active: 1976–77
- Past members: Alan Gill; David Balfe; Keith Hartley; Steven Brick

Radio Blank was an English short-lived R&B and punk band formed on the Wirral Peninsula, in November 1976, by Alan Gill (guitar), Keith Hartley (vocals), David Balfe (bass) and Steven Brick (drums).

In mid 1970s, Gill, Hartley and Balfe, who lived in Thingwall, Wirral, were in a band called Mr. McKenzie. In November 1976, the band changed their name to Radio Blank, and were inspired by punk and popular Liverpool band Deaf School, playing only fifteen times, five of those at Eric's Club, in Liverpool. The band were playing their own material, and also covers such as The Kinks' "You Really Got Me" and "Peaches" (originally by The Stranglers).

At the end of 1977, Gill and Balfe felt punk was not interesting, and they decided to disband Radio Blank. They went on to form Dalek I Love You in December 1977, alongside keyboardist Dave Hughes and Chris Teepe.

After leaving Radio Blank, Brick went on to work with several other bands and produce music in the studio but never toured with any of them. He continued to work as a session musician and worked with several local bands during the 1980s. He later went on to roadying and was making more money roadying than playing. He continued roadying until 1989. Today, he is happily married with three children and is an athletics coach at Wirral Athletic Club. He has coached many county and northern champions, but has vowed to come back and play the drums again one day. Steve is now playing drums with his own covers band called "Zapp" and also plays drums for "Catch the Moon" he was 70 in December 2025 and still loves playing the drums

Balfe quit Dalek I Love You to join Big in Japan and The Teardrop Explodes, who, in 1980, included Gill. He released three singles and an album called Compass Kumpas, between 1979 and 1980, with Dalek I Love You, without Balfe, and, after being in The Teardrop Explodes, he revived the band, and included singer Keith Hartley to sing in the eponymous Dalek I Love You album in 1983.

Before joining Dalek I Love You, Hartley formed Godot, alongside Hughes.

2018 saw the band's first release on vinyl through Love Child Records – a four track 7" vinyl E.P. entitled "The Mary Whitehouse E.P.".
