= English Electric (album) =

Studio album by Orchestral Manoeuvres in the Dark
- Released: 5 April 2013
- Recorded: Motor Museum (Liverpool), Bleepworks (London)
- Genre: Synth-pop
- Length: 43:05
- Labels: BMG, 100%
- Producer: OMD

Orchestral Manoeuvres in the Dark chronology
History of Modern (2010)	English Electric (2013)	The Punishment of Luxury (2017)

Singles from English Electric
- 1. "Metroland" Released: 25 March 2013; 2. "The Future Will Be Silent" Released: 20 April 2013; 3. "Dresden" Released: 20 May 2013; 4. "Night Café" Released: 16 September 2013

English Electric is the twelfth studio album by English electronic band Orchestral Manoeuvres in the Dark (OMD), and their second since the 2006 reformation of the group. Preceded by lead single "Metroland" on 25 March 2013, it was initially released on 5 April 2013 by 100% Records, followed by a UK release on 8 April. Unlike predecessor History of Modern (2010), which was compiled remotely via the Internet, English Electric saw OMD co-founders Andy McCluskey and Paul Humphreys write and record in person, with the aim of recreating their artistic chemistry in years past. The album was largely inspired by McCluskey's then-recent divorce.

English Electric met with positive reviews, and attracted favourable comparisons to the band's early-to-mid 1980s work—in particular the experimental Dazzle Ships (1983). It peaked at #12 on the UK Albums Chart and topped the UK Independent Albums Chart. As with History of Modern, the record was a Top 10 hit in Germany, reaching #10. It also made #8 on the Dance/Electronic Albums Billboard chart in the United States.

== Background ==
Whereas predecessor History of Modern (2010) had been compiled remotely via the Internet, McCluskey and Humphreys wrote and recorded in person for English Electric, in the hope of rekindling the chemistry of days gone by. Humphreys stated, "We sat down and wrote the whole album in Andy's house in one go. We had a focus: to go back to our early sound, make a very electronic record, get rid of all the organic stuff, experiment and be free. We both felt like kids again, experimenting with our machines." McCluskey said of the album's songwriting content, "My wife and I separated, then ultimately divorced, and my two youngest children went to live in America with her, so I was left at home for English Electric with nothing else to do but write about the pain."

The record was named after defunct British industrial manufacturer English Electric. On 14 January 2013, the band announced details of the album release date, track listing, and a teaser video featuring the short Dazzle Ships-esque track "Decimal". The video for "Atomic Ranch" premiered on Pitchfork on 4 February. The animated videos for "Decimal", "Atomic Ranch" and "Please Remain Seated" were created by Henning M. Lederer, and were included on the bonus DVD of English Electric.

Lead single "Metroland" premiered on the BBC Radio 6 Music radio show Radcliffe & Maconie on 11 February. "Dresden" was released digitally as the second single from the album on 17 May; the promotional video had premiered on The New York Times website a week earlier. The single bundle features a remix by John Foxx and the Maths, who supported OMD on the UK part of their English Electric Tour. For Record Store Day 2013, a 500-copy limited edition 10-inch picture disc EP of "The Future Will Be Silent" was made available, which includes an exclusive non-album track titled "Time Burns".

The track "Kissing the Machine" originally featured on the 1993 album Esperanto by Elektric Music, a project by Karl Bartos after he left Kraftwerk. The track, co-written by McCluskey, was completely reworked by Humphreys for English Electric, and features Claudia Brücken of Propaganda (Humphreys' then-partner) as the voice of the machine. "Helen of Troy" is a songwriting collaboration with Greek production outfit Fotonovela. The track "Stay with Me" features Humphreys on vocals for the first time since the release of 1988 "Dreaming" B-side "Gravity Never Failed".

English Electric was released on CD, deluxe CD+DVD, heavyweight vinyl LP, a collector's tin boxset, and digitally. Its cover art was designed by longtime OMD collaborator Peter Saville.

== Reception ==
Professional ratings
Aggregate scores
Source	Rating
Metacritic	76/100
Review scores
Source	Rating
AllMusic	3.5/5 stars
The Arts Desk	4/5 stars
Classic Pop	5/5 stars
Consequence of Sound	4/5 stars
The Irish Times	4/5 stars
Magnet	8/10 stars
Mojo	4/5 stars
MusicOMH	4/5 stars
PopMatters	8/10 stars
Today	4/5 stars

English Electric met with positive reviews, and attracted favourable comparisons to OMD's early-to-mid 1980s work—in particular the experimental Dazzle Ships (1983). At Metacritic, which assigns a normalised rating out of 100 to reviews from mainstream critics, the album received an average score of 76, based on 15 reviews.

In comparing English Electric to its predecessor, Thomas H. Green of The Arts Desk wrote, "...History of Modern, tipped its hat to all OMD's musical incarnations and was a mixed bag, if occasionally pleasing. Their new one, however, returns to their pristine synth-pop roots and is a corker." PopMatters critic John Bergstrom called it "the best OMD album in at least 29 years", observing "a consistent theme and feel, though the individual songs take on a variety of moods and approaches." Alan Ranta of Exclaim! noted, "English Electric brings to mind the effort Orbital put forth in 2012 (Wonky), which recalled that UK group's glory days while looking to the future... this album shows a band at the top of their game." Irish Times journalist Tony Clayton-Lea felt the record borrows from Kraftwerk, but said, "What drags it out of the homage/pastiche area is the song craft, which is so ridiculously accomplished that you have no option but to whistle from start to finish."

American indie rock musician Telekinesis wrote, "OMD... have reached back to their milestone that was Dazzle Ships, and made an absolutely gorgeous record that picks up where that one left off. And my goodness, have they aged gracefully." English Electric went on to appear in critics' lists of the best albums of 2013; in a poll of 3,200 Modern Synthpop readers, it was voted the 15th-best synth-pop album of the 2010s. Mark Lindores of Classic Pop later said, "English Electric emerges as a collection that immediately ranks in the upper echelons of OMD's discography... the crisp synths, driving bass and eclectic electronics all accentuate their superb songwriting."

== Track listing ==
No.	Title	Writer(s)	Length
1.	"Please Remain Seated"	Andy McCluskey	0:44
2.	"Metroland"	McCluskey, Paul Humphreys	7:33
3.	"Night Café"	McCluskey, Humphreys	3:46
4.	"The Future Will Be Silent"	McCluskey, Humphreys	2:41
5.	"Helen of Troy"	McCluskey, Nikos Bitzenis, George Geranios	4:13
6.	"Our System"	McCluskey, Humphreys	4:33
7.	"Kissing the Machine"	McCluskey, Karl Bartos	5:06
8.	"Decimal"	McCluskey	1:16
9.	"Stay with Me"	McCluskey, Humphreys, James Watson	4:27
10.	"Dresden"	McCluskey	3:37
11.	"Atomic Ranch"	McCluskey	1:44
12.	"Final Song"	McCluskey, Kurt Weill, Langston Hughes	3:25

iTunes bonus track
No.	Title	Length
13.	"No Man's Land"	4:26

Notes

- "Final Song" contains samples from "Lonely House" as performed by Abbey Lincoln.

== Personnel ==
Credits for English Electric adapted from the liner notes.

Orchestral Manoeuvres in the Dark

- OMD – production
- Andy McCluskey – vocals, bass guitar, keyboards
- Paul Humphreys – vocals, keyboards, mixing
- Martin Cooper – keyboards
- Malcolm Holmes – drums (all tracks); additional programming (6)

Additional personnel

- Claudia Brücken – machine voice (7)
- Mirelle Davis – management
- Fotonovela – additional programming (5)
- Guy Katsav – additional production (10)
- Abbey Lincoln – sample performer (12)
- Innes Marlow – photography
- Charles Reeves – Chinese recording (1)
- Peter Saville – art direction
- Tom Skipp – sleeve design
- Mike Spink – additional engineering (2)
- David Watson – backing vocals (9)
- James Watson – additional programming (9)

== Charts ==
Chart (2013)	Peak position
Austrian Albums (Ö3 Austria)	68
Belgian Albums (Ultratop Flanders)	91
Belgian Albums (Ultratop Wallonia)	49
German Albums (Offizielle Top 100)	10
Greek Albums (IFPI)	14
Irish Albums (IRMA)	52
Scottish Albums (Official Charts)	18
Spanish Albums (Promusicae)	60
Swiss Albums (Schweizer Hitparade)	46
UK Albums (Official Charts)	12
UK Independent Albums (Official Charts)	1
US Top Dance/Electronic Albums (Billboard)	8

== Release history ==
Region	Date	Label
Germany	5 April 2013	BMG Rights Management
France	5 April 2013	BMG Rights Management
United Kingdom	8 April 2013	BMG Rights Management (UK) Limited, 100% Records
Italy	9 April 2013	BMG Rights Management
United States	9 April 2013	BMG Rights Management
Japan	24 April 2013	Sony Music Entertainment Japan
