= The Listening Pool =

English synth-pop band

- Origin: The Wirral, England
- Genres: Synth-pop
- Years active: 1989–1996
- Labels: Telegraph
- Past members: Paul Humphreys; Malcolm Holmes; Martin Cooper

The Listening Pool was an English band, founded by three former members of Orchestral Manoeuvres in the Dark (OMD), after the original-lineup split in 1989. It was composed of Paul Humphreys, Malcolm Holmes and Martin Cooper.

The group released one album, Still Life (1994).

== History ==
=== Name ===
Martin Cooper on how they came up with the band's name from an interview in the Telegraph fanzine:

Well it's hard to say exactly who thought of it. We were in LA and had been kicking about names for ages. We had this piece of paper with all sorts of words written on it and the name just came about. It may have been me who put the two names together.

Paul Humphreys:

We had sheets and sheets of words and we just put some together.

=== Contractual difficulties ===
The Listening Pool had to overcome a few obstacles before they could release their CD. The Listening Pool could not release any music since Paul Humphreys and Andy McCluskey signed an agreement releasing Paul from his contract with Virgin Records while allowing Andy to continue using the name OMD. Until new OMD material was issued, nothing could be done on Paul's end.

Martin stated in the same Telegraph interview:

Andy could get on with his record because Virgin were financing him during that period. We were writing, but we couldn't do anything. Once Andy had released his record (Sugar Tax), we were free of all contracts and things, but we didn't have a label, so we had to look around.

The Listening Pool originally signed with a record label called Inevitable, which later folded. The band then formed their own independent label, Telegraph Records. OMD had previously used the fictitious "Telegraph" label for Dazzle Ships (1983), to maintain the image of being signed to an "indie" label.

=== Debut single and album ===
The Listening Pool released its debut single, "Oil for the Lamps of China", on 12 July 1993. It peaked at number 94 in the UK singles chart. The band's debut album, titled Still Life, was released in 1994. The style of Still Life was quite a change from the electronic sound of OMD of old, using the individual talents of the members with more acoustic drums, saxophone and keyboards.

=== Split ===
In 1996, after recording some songs intended for a follow-up album, one of which was titled "Satellite" the band split. Paul Humphreys went on to form the band Onetwo with Claudia Brucken, Martin Cooper resumed his painting career and Mal Holmes continued to work in the music industry.

In 2006 the classic OMD line-up of McCluskey, Humphreys, Cooper, and Holmes reunited, and continued to tour and record.

== Discography ==
=== Album ===
Still Life (1994)

1. "Meant to Be" – 4:15
2. "Oil for the Lamps of China" – 3:34
3. "Follow Where You Go" – 3:54
4. "Breathless" – 4:17
5. "Somebody Somewhere" (with Paul Roberts) – 4:03
6. "Photograph of You" (with Simon Dutton) – 4:17
7. "Promised the World" – 4:28
8. "Blue Africa" – 4:33
9. "Still Life" – 4:34
10. "Where Do We Go from Here" – 3:33
11. "Wild Strawberries" (with Thomas Lang) – 3:55
12. "Hand Me That Universe" – 2:11

==== Reception ====
Professional ratings
Review scores
Source	Rating
AllMusic	4/5 stars

Michael Sutton of AllMusic wrote, "The Listening Pool's jazzy, laid-back grooves on Still Life have more in common with the lush, romantic pop of China Crisis, the Blue Nile, and Roxy Music... The songs are magnificent, refreshingly moving beyond OMD's limited canvas." Trouser Press stated, "The Listening Pool crafts a pleasant, organic sound as akin to later Talk Talk or China Crisis as OMD. Highlighted by the fine single 'Oil for the Lamps of China', Still Life is worthwhile for hardcore OMD-ers." P.F. Wilson of City Pages wrote that the band "made a great album, but it's kind of hard to find".

=== Singles ===
"Oil for the Lamps of China" (1993)

- CD single
1. "Oil for the Lamps of China" – 3:34
2. "Where Do We Go from Here" – 3:34
3. "Oil for the Lamps of China (Extended Version)" – 6:02
4. "Oil for the Lamps of China (Instrumental)" – 3:30
- 12" single
1. "Oil for the Lamps of China (Extended Version)" – 6:00
2. "Oil for the Lamps of China (Single Mix)" – 3:30
3. "Where Do We Go from Here" – 3:34
- Cassette single
1. "Oil for the Lamps of China" – 3:34
2. "Where Do We Go from Here" – 3:34
3. "Oil for the Lamps of China (Extended Version)" – 6:02
4. "Oil for the Lamps of China (Instrumental)" – 3:30

"Meant to Be" (1995)

- CD single
1. "Meant to Be" – 4:15
2. "Meant to Be (Extended Version)" – 6:42
3. "Meant to Be (Instrumental)" – 4:18

== Telegraph Records ==
The Listening Pool formed their own independent label, Telegraph Records. Besides releasing their own work, they also signed artists like Peter Coyle (both as a solo artist and as part of Pure Journey) and China Crisis. The label was short lived resulting in a brief catalogue.

=== Releases ===
Release date	Catalogue	Format	Artist	Title	Producer	Notes
22 April 1993	TLGCD006	5" CD single	China Crisis	"Black Man Ray"	Mark Phythian	Live at the Neptune Theatre in Liverpool
24 May 1993	TLGCD005	CD	China Crisis	Acoustically Yours	Mark Phythian	Live at the Neptune Theatre in Liverpool
24 May 1993	TLGMC005	Cassette	China Crisis	Acoustically Yours	Mark Phythian	Live at the Neptune Theatre in Liverpool
24 May 1993	TLGCD007	CD	Thomas Lang	Versions	Andrew Redhead, David A Hughes, John Murphy, Paul Humphreys, The Listening Pool	
12 July 1993	TLGT001	12" single	The Listening Pool	"Oil for the Lamps of China"	The Listening Pool, Ronnie Stone	
12 July 1993	TLGMC001	Cassette single	The Listening Pool	"Oil for the Lamps of China"	The Listening Pool, Ronnie Stone	
12 July 1993	TLGCD001	5" CD single	The Listening Pool	"Oil for the Lamps of China"	The Listening Pool, Ronnie Stone	
October 1994	TLGCD002	CD	The Listening Pool	Still Life	The Listening Pool, Ronnie Stone	
27 February 1995	TLGCD003	5" CD single	The Listening Pool	"Meant to Be"	The Listening Pool	
1995	TLGCD004	CD	Nicola and Alexandra Bibby	Debussy & Fauré	Martin Cooper	Classical music, songs composed by Claude Debussy and Gabriel Fauré
