= Martin Cooper (musician) =

English painter and musician

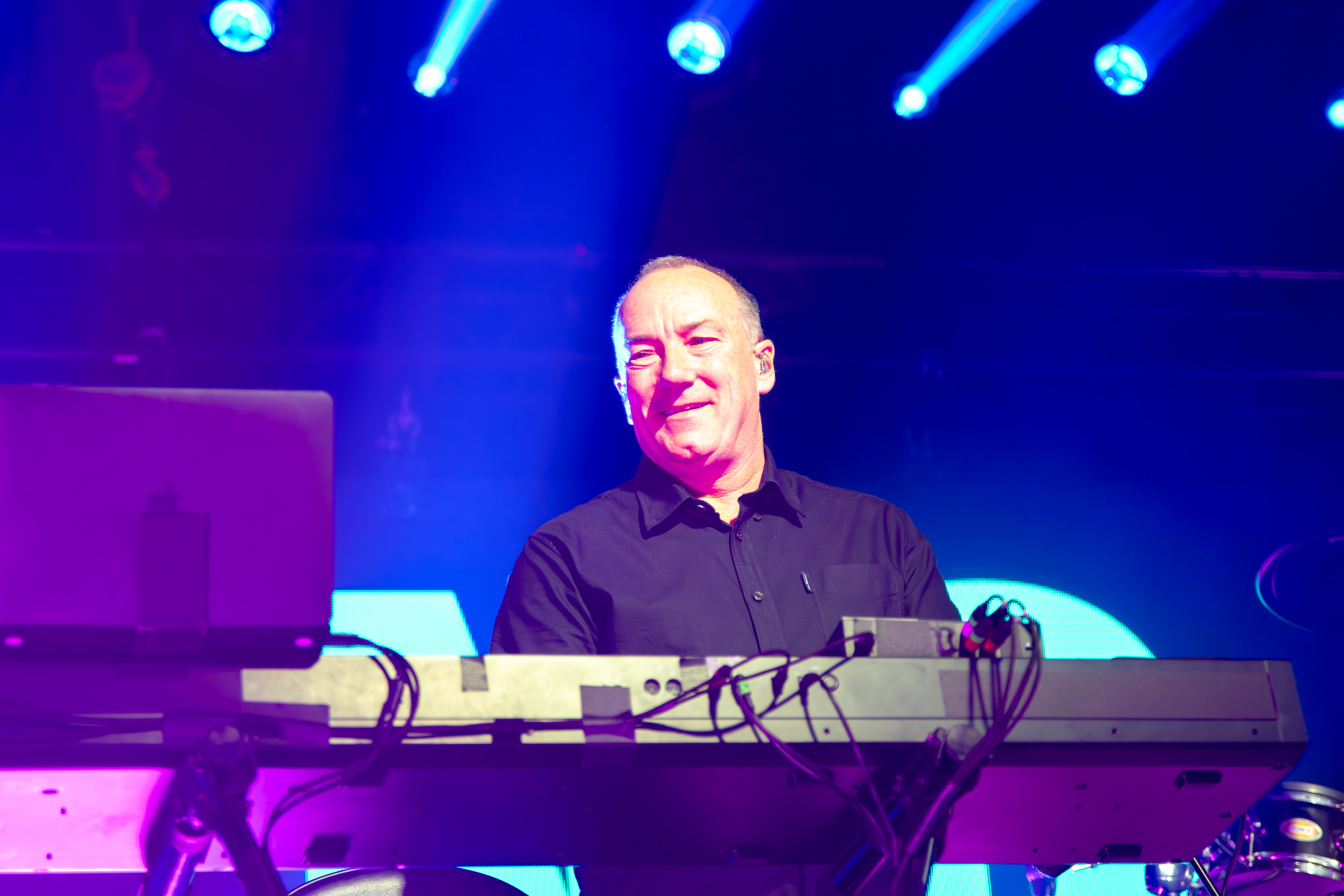
- Cooper performing with OMD in 2024

Background information
- Born: 1 October 1958 (age 67); Liverpool, England
- Genres: New wave; synth-pop
- Occupations: Musician; painter
- Instruments: Keyboards; saxophone
- Years active: 1980–present
- Website: martincooper.uk.com

Martin Cooper (born 1 October 1958) is an English musician. He is the secondary keyboardist and occasional saxophonist for the band Orchestral Manoeuvres in the Dark, whom he first joined in 1980.

== Early life ==
Cooper was born in Liverpool and studied art at the Laird School of Art in Birkenhead. He obtained a first class honours degree in Fine Arts at the Sheffield College of Art in 1980.

== Career ==
=== Music ===
From 1980 until 1989, Cooper was a member of the new wave group Orchestral Manoeuvres in the Dark. Prior to joining OMD, Cooper played the saxophone at some of their concerts, or they used his pre-recorded work. He also played with Dalek I Love You. In 1981, he briefly left OMD to join Dave Hughes for a project called Godot.

Cooper also made some writing contributions to their songs. His biggest success was "Souvenir", co-written with Paul Humphreys, which reached number 3 in the UK Singles Chart.

Besides playing in OMD, Cooper and Hughes wrote film scores for C.H.U.D. and Knights and Armour amongst others. After OMD split in 1989, Cooper formed The Listening Pool with ex-OMD members Paul Humphreys and Malcolm Holmes. They also founded their own record label, Telegraph Records. The Listening Pool released one album Still Life, which had one of Cooper's paintings as the album cover. The band broke up in 1996.

In 2007, Cooper rejoined OMD and continues to record and tour with them to this day.

=== Painting ===
During his hiatus from OMD, Cooper devoted most of his time to painting. Many of his works are still life pictures.

== Personal life ==
Cooper is married to Alexandra Bibby, a classical pianist, and they have two sons, Gabriel (Gabe) and Arthur.
