= Compass Kumpas =

Studio album by Dalek I
- Released: 24 May 24 1980
- Studios: Rockfield (Rockfield, Wales); Amazon (Liverpool)
- Genre: Synth-pop
- Length: 40:14
- Label: Back Door/Phonogram
- Producer: The Blitz Brothers

Dalek I chronology
Compass Kumpas (1980)	Dalek I Love You (1983)

Compass Kumpas CD re-release Fontana 1989

Compass Kumpas (aka Compass kum'pəs) was the first album from Dalek I Love You, shortened to Dalek I for this album and accompanying singles. It was released on May 24, 1980, by Back Door/Phonogram records.

In 1983, the band recorded a second, self-titled album using its full name: Dalek I Love You.

In 1989 Compass Kumpas was reissued on CD (Fontana 836 894–2) with four bonus tracks.

== Reception ==
Professional ratings
Review scores
Source	Rating
Smash Hits	5/10

Sounding like a combination of early Orchestral Manoeuvres in the Dark, Gary Numan and Brian Eno, the album received fairly good reviews upon its release. The NME called the album "refreshingly wry and friendly". However, Red Starr, writing in Smash Hits, described the album as a "characterless, colourless collection.

It reached #54 on the UK singles chart.

The album was ignored outside of the UK, and before long, Alan Gill left the band to join The Teardrop Explodes, although he returned in 1981.

The album has a cult following, and the single "Destiny (Dalek I Love You)" remains popular among Doctor Who fans for its oblique lyrics about the show's menacing villains, the Daleks.

== Track listing ==
All tracks written by Alan Gill and Dave Hughes; except "You Really Got Me" by Ray Davies
Side 1 – Topsy

1. "The World" – 2:27
2. "8 Track" – 2:27
3. "Dalek I Love You (Destiny)" – 3:37
4. "A Suicide" – 2:53
5. "The Kiss" – 2:00
6. "Trapped" – 4:00
7. "Two Chameleons" – 3:18

Side 2 – Turvy

1. "Freedom Fighters" – 2:08
2. "You Really Got Me" – 1:56
3. "Mad" – 1:48
4. "Good Times" – 2:07
5. "We're All Actors" – 2:52
6. "Heat" – 3:11
7. "Missing 15 Minutes" – 5:36

=== The 1989 Fontana CD re-release featured the following bonus tracks ===
1. "Astronauts (Have Landed on the Moon)" – 3:27 (B-side to "Heartbeat")
2. "Happy" – 2:33 (B-side to 1980 "Dalek I Love You" single)
3. "This is My Uniform" – 3:13 (B-side to 1980 "Dalek I Love You" single)
4. "Heartbeat" – 4:01 (1981 Single)

== Personnel ==
Dalek I

- Alan Gill
- Dave Hughes

with:

- Chris Hughes - additional drums, percussion and FX
- Hugh Jones - bass on "Heat"
- Ken Peers - drums on "You Really Got Me"
- Dave Bates - additional backing vocals

Recorded at Rockfield Studios, Monmouth and Amazon Studios, Liverpool, by Hugh Jones and Frazer Henry.

Turvy 2, 7 produced by Dalek I for God Productions
