= Thingwall =

Coordinates: 53.353°N 3.092°W

- Village
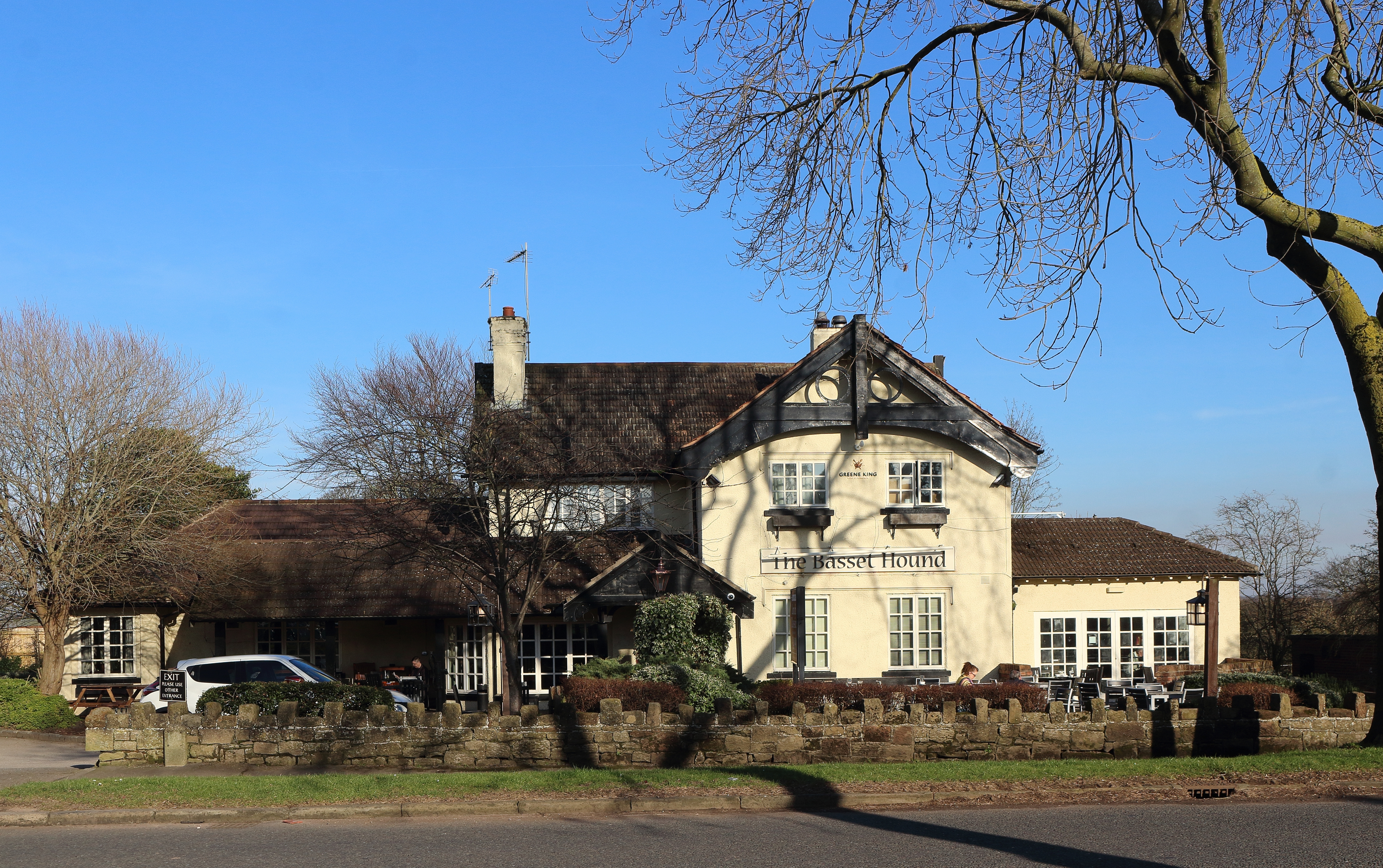
- The Basset Hound public house, Thingwall

- Location within Merseyside
- Population: 3,140 (2001 census)
- OS grid reference: SJ270850
  - London: 178 mi (286 km) SE
- Metropolitan borough: Wirral
- Metropolitan county: Merseyside
- Region: North West
- Country: England
- Sovereign state: United Kingdom
- Post town: WIRRAL
- Postcode district: CH61
- Dialling code: 0151
- ISO 3166 code: GB-WRL
- Police: Merseyside
- Fire: Merseyside
- Ambulance: North West
- UK Parliament: Wirral West

Thingwall is a village on the Wirral Peninsula, in Merseyside, England. The village is situated approximately 8 km (5.0 mi) to the south west of Birkenhead and 3 km (1.9 mi) north east of Heswall. Historically part of Cheshire, the area is within the Pensby and Thingwall Ward of the Metropolitan Borough of Wirral and the parliamentary constituency of Wirral West.

At the 2001 census, Thingwall had 3,140 inhabitants. The 2011 census registered the total ward population at 13,007.

== History ==
From the Old Norse þing vollr, meaning 'assembly field', the name indicates that it was once the site of a Germanic thing (or þing). Similar place names in the British Isles include Tynwald, Dingwall, and Tingwall; see also Thingvellir in Iceland and Tingvoll in Norway. A place called "Tingvalla" can also be found in the Swedish town Karlstad where it can be dated back to the Viking age as a council- and market-place.

The settlement was recorded in the Domesday Book of 1086 as Tuigvelle, and has been variously known as Fingwalle (1180); Thingale (circa 1250); Thynghwall (1426). Thingwall was formerly a township in the parish of Woodchurch, in Wirral Hundred, in 1866 Thingwall became a separate civil parish, on 1 April 1933 the parish was abolished and merged with Birkenhead St Mary and became part of Birkenhead county borough. The population was 52 in 1801, 96 in 1851, 156 in 1901 and 652 in 1931.

Traditional buildings/walls in the area are constructed of locally-quarried yellow sandstone. Several small sandstone quarries once existed in the area including one at the top of the appropriately named Quarry Lane. Little evidence of these quarries now exists as the land has been redeveloped for housing or for the construction of a second above-ground fresh water reservoir.

Thingwall Mill was constructed in the eighteenth century on the site of a much older medieval mill. Damaged in a storm in 1897 and subsequently disused, the mill was demolished in 1900. However, remnants of the building, including the original millstone, can still be found on Mill Road.

Thingwall Hall was built in 1849 for a Liverpool merchant and demolished in 1960. It was part of the Royal Liverpool Children's Hospital from 1917, providing care for long-term patients.

On 1 April 1974, local government reorganisation in England and Wales resulted in most of Wirral, including Thingwall, being transferred from the county of Cheshire to Merseyside.

== Geography ==
Thingwall lies on the western side of the northern part of the Wirral Peninsula, 4.7 miles (7.5 km) from the Irish Sea at Hoylake, 2.3 miles (3.7 km) from the Dee Estuary and about 4.1 miles (6.6 km) from the River Mersey at Rock Ferry. Thingwall sits at the western side of the wide and shallow glacial U-shaped valley, formed during the Quaternary Ice Age, between Thurstaston Hill and Storeton Ridge. The underlying bedrock is Triassic sandstone of the Helsby Sandstone Formation and the Wilmslow Sandstone Formation, and Triassic siltstone of the Tarporley Siltstone Formation. This is overlain with boulder clay from the Quaternary Ice Age, similar to the nearby Dee Cliffs, and clay soil. The bedrock is not usually visible, as it is at the summit of Thurstaston Hill.

== Governance ==
Thingwall is part of the Metropolitan Borough of Wirral, in the metropolitan county of Merseyside. The village is part of the parliamentary constituency of Wirral West. The current Member of Parliament is Margaret Greenwood, a Labour Party (UK) representative.

At local government level, the village is part of the Pensby and Thingwall Ward of the Metropolitan Borough of Wirral. Thingwall is represented on Wirral Metropolitan Borough Council by three councillors. The most recent local elections took place on 6 May 2021.

== Notable people ==
- Alan Gill and David Balfe, English musicians with the late 70s/early 80s bands Radio Blank, Dalek I Love You and The Teardrop Explodes, both raised in Thingwall. David Balfe went on to run his own record labels, to one of which he signed Blur, and later became the inspiration behind their 1995 number one song, "Country House".
- Marty Willson-Piper, English guitarist and songwriter with Australian band The Church, was raised in Thingwall.
- Septimus Francom, English athlete, born in Thingwall.
- George Payne, English footballer, died in Thingwall.

== Bibliography ==
- Cavill, Paul; Harding, Stephen; Jesch, Judith (2000). Wirral and Its Viking Heritage. English Place-Name Society. ISBN 978-0-904889-59-8.
- Harding, Stephen (2002). "Chapter 10: The Things of Wirral and West Lancashire". Viking Mersey: Scandinavian Wirral, West Lancashire and Chester. Countryvise Limited. pp. 141–152. ISBN 978-1-901231-3-42.
- Harding, Stephen; Jobling, Mark; King, Turi (2010). Viking DNA: The Wirral and West Lancashire Project. Nottingham University Press. ISBN 978-1-907284-94-6.
- Mortimer, William Williams (1847). The History of the Hundred of Wirral. London: Whittaker & Co. p.289.
