= George Payne (footballer, born 1921) =

English footballer

Personal information
- Date of birth: 22 August 1921
- Place of birth: Liverpool, England
- Date of death: 6 April 1987 (aged 65)
- Place of death: Thingwall, England
- Position: Goalkeeper

Senior career*
Years	Team	Apps	(Gls)
1946–1961	Tranmere Rovers	439	(0)
1961–?	Northwich Victoria		
- * Club domestic league appearances and goals

George Payne (22 August 1921 – 6 April 1987) was an English footballer who played as a goalkeeper for Tranmere Rovers and Northwich Victoria. He made 467 appearances for Tranmere.
