= Tingwall =

Tingwall may refer to the following places in Scotland:

- Tingwall, Orkney
- Tingwall, Shetland
- Tingwall Airport, Shetland Islands.

It may also refer to:

- Albin Tingwall (born 2003), Swedish singer

== See also ==
- Dingwall
- Tynwald
- Thingwall
- Þingvellir
- Tingvoll Municipality
