= The Blitz Brothers =

- Origin: England
- Genres: New wave
- Years active: c. 1979 – c. 1980
- Past members: Dave Bates; Steve Lovell; Hugh Jones; Chris Hughes

The Blitz Brothers were an English new wave band based in Merseyside, England, comprising Chris Hughes (drums and FX), Dave Bates (vocals), Steve Lovell (guitars) and Hugh Jones (bass).

They released two singles, "Gloria" in 1979 and "Rose Tattoo" in 1980. By this time they had founded the subsidiary label Back Door, which signed the synthpop band Dalek I Love You. The band helped to produce and collaborate in the "Dalek I Love You (Destiny)" single and the debut album Compass Kumpas.

Later, Chris Hughes joined Adam and the Ants, and in 1981 he worked again with Dalek I Love You.

== Discography ==
- "Gloria" (1979)
- "Rose Tattoo" (1980)
