= Malcolm Holmes =

British drummer (born 1960)

- Born: 28 July 1960 (age 66); Birkenhead, England
- Genres: New wave; synth-pop
- Occupations: Drummer; producer
- Instrument: Drums
- Website: malholmes.com

Malcolm Holmes (born 28 July 1960) is a British drummer. He is best known for being the original drummer with Orchestral Manoeuvres in the Dark (OMD). After leaving OMD in 1989, he drummed for spin-off band The Listening Pool. He served as drummer for the reformed OMD from 2006 until departing in 2015 due to health concerns.

== Biography ==
Holmes' first drumming sessions were for the Id, who included future members of OMD. He also played on sessions for the Pale Fountains, Dalek I Love You, the Lightning Seeds and Margi Clarke, a.k.a. Margox in the late 1970s. He joined OMD in 1980.

Holmes played on over 130 of the band's songs as well contributing live performances at hundreds of OMD concerts. On his first Top of the Pops TV performance in 1980, he performed standing up, playing an electronic drum kit. He used a home made electronic drum kit for live performances before they became available to the mass market. Holmes' session drumming engagements included the theme song to British television soap opera Brookside.

Holmes left with other OMD members in 1989 to form spin-off band The Listening Pool. He rejoined OMD when they reformed in 2006.

In July 2013, while touring with OMD in Toronto, in reported stage temperatures of above 45 degrees Celsius, he collapsed during a show. They subsequently left the stage, where Holmes' heart stopped. The band later announced the cancellation of the rest of their tour, which included a headlining slot at Rewind Festival in Scotland on 28 July 2013, his 53rd birthday. After making a steady recovery over the following months, Holmes retired from live performances, but continues to work in the music industry.
