= Dalek I Love You (album) =

Studio album by Dalek I Love You
- Released: 1983
- Recorded: 1982
- Label: Korova
- Producer: Dalek I Love You

Dalek I Love You chronology
Compass Kumpas (1980)	Dalek I Love You (1983)	Naive (1986)

Dalek I Love You is the 1983 album from Dalek I Love You. On 2 April 2007, it was made available for the first time on CD.

== Track listing ==
All songs were written by Dalek I Love You, except where noted.

=== LP ===
Korova KODE 7 (UK), 24-0258-1 (Europe)

Side One

1. "Holiday in Disneyland" (Dalek I Love You, Keith Hartley) – 4:40
2. "Horrorscope" – 4:03
3. "Health and Happiness" (Dalek I Love You, K. Hartley) – 3:14
4. "The Mouse That Roared" (Dalek I Love You, K. Hartley) – 2:49
5. "Dad on Fire" – 3:39
6. "Ambition" – 3:43

Side Two

7. "Lust" (Dalek I Love You, K. Hartley) – 4:22
8. "12 Hours of Blues" – 5:32
9. "Sons of Sahara" – 5:27
10. "Africa Express" – 7:14

=== CD Bonus Tracks ===
(2007 UK Korova KODE 1016)
11. "Would You Still Love Me" (Dalek I Love You, K. Hartley) – 4:22
12. "These Walls We Build" (Dalek I Love You, K. Hartley) – 5:05
13. "Horrorscope" (Instrumental Version) – 6:04
14. "Masks & Licences" – 3:05
15. "The Angel and The Clown" – 3:40
16. "Heaven Was Bought for Me" – 4:08
17. "12 Hours of Blues" (Dub) – 5:54

== Personnel ==
Dalek I Love You

- Alan Gill
- Gordon Hon
- Kenny Peers

with backing vocalists Chuca Russo, Heather Balshaw and Amanda Hon (née Hawkins).
