= Alan Gill =

British musician

- Origin: Thingwall, Wirral Peninsula, England
- Genres: Punk rock, synthpop, post-punk, new wave, psychedelia
- Occupations: Singer; songwriter; guitarist; record producer; sound engineer; film score composer
- Instruments: Guitar, vocals
- Years active: Mid-1970s–present

Alan David Gill is an English vocalist, guitarist and songwriter, who formed part of the synthpop band Dalek I Love You and the post-punk/neo-psychedelic band the Teardrop Explodes.

== Biography ==
=== Early career ===
Living in Thingwall, Wirral, he formed alongside Keith Hartley, Karl Simms and drummer Roy Cadwallader a band called Mr. McKenzie. Their first gig at St Hughes hall in Birkenhead with David Balfe joining later.

In November 1976, with the onset of punk rock, the band changed their name to Radio Blank, with Stephen Brick joining on drums. The band played punk and R&B songs as well as covers like "You Really Got Me" by the Kinks and "Peaches" by the Stranglers, but Gill and Balfe changed their musical views, dissolving the band to go in a far more experimental direction.

=== Dalek I Love You ===
Gill and Balfe next founded the experimental band Dalek I Love You in December 1977, along with David Hughes and Chris Teepee.

=== The Teardrop Explodes ===
Gill was also an influential member of the Teardrop Explodes, playing lead guitar and co-writing their biggest hit "Reward" with frontman Julian Cope, which reached No. 6 in the UK Singles Chart. Gill performed on their 1980 gold-selling album Kilimanjaro. He was an influence on Cope, as documented in the latter's 1994 autobiography Head On, in which Cope described Gill as his "guru", turning him from "tense to loose to slack in three months". Gill introduced Cope to LSD before leaving the band to concentrate on Dalek I Love You.

=== Film score composing and other works ===
After Dalek I Love You released their final album, Gill turned to film scoring, most notably for the 1985 film Letter to Brezhnev in which he worked with the Royal Liverpool Philharmonic Orchestra. In 1985, Gill also formed the cassette-only Bop-a-dub label, which released the Dalek I Love You album Naïve. In 1991, Gill scored the film Blonde Fist. Also that year, Gill acted as engineer for legendary British folk musician Davey Graham. Part of Graham's album Playing in Traffic was recorded at Gill's studio in Raby Mere, Wirral. Around this time Gill became disillusioned with the hard-edged music business and retreated from the music scene completely, notably not picking up a guitar for 15 years.

=== Popular culture ===
Gill's band inspired the title of Dalek I Love You, a radio drama which premiered on the British digital radio station BBC Radio 7 on 11 February 2006. The story centred on a man obsessed with Doctor Who who falls in love at a science fiction convention. The band also inspired the title of Dalek I Loved You, an autobiography by the journalist Nick Griffiths about his life as a Doctor Who fan, published in 2007.

=== Recent years ===
In 2009, a Dalek I Love You track, "The World", was featured on the soundtrack to the film Awaydays. Gill's guitar, painted by himself in a tribal style, is played by main protagonist Elvis in one scene. In 2010, Gill, along with Balfe and Gary Dwyer (minus Cope), picked up a Mojo "inspiration" award for the Teardrop Explodes at the MOJO Awards in London. Afterward, Gill immersed himself in music again and embarked on a new band project called the Most High, with Simon Walthew (bass), Ikem Washner (drums) and Phil Channell (keyboards and flute).
