= Dalek I Love You =

English synthpop group

- Also known as: Dalek I
- Origin: Wirral, England
- Genres: Synth-pop; post-punk; art rock; new wave
- Years active: 1977–1980; 1981–1985
- Labels: Inevitable; Phonogram; Vertigo; Back Door; Korova; Bop a Dub
- Past members: David Balfe; Alan Gill; Dave Hughes; Chris Teepee; Martin Cooper; Andy McCluskey; Kenny Peers; Gordon Hon; Max the Actor; Keith Hartley

Dalek I Love You were a synth-pop group from the Wirral, England. At various points in their existence, the band was also known as Dalek I. Record executives at Phonogram shortened the band's name without telling them for the "Freedom Fighters" single.

== History ==
=== Roots: Mr. McKenzie and Radio Blank ===
By the mid-1970s, David Balfe, Alan Gill and Keith Hartley, three residents of Thingwall on the Wirral Peninsula, were playing in a 'pub covers' band called Mr. McKenzie. In November 1976, as punk emerged and inspired them, the group changed their name to Radio Blank. The new line-up consisted of Balfe (bass), Gill (guitar and vocals), Hartley (lead vocals and guitar), and Stephen Brick (drums).

They played their own material and also some covers, such as "You Really Got Me" and "Peaches". Five of their 15 live gigs were at Eric's Club in Liverpool. Balfe and Gill lost interest in punk towards the end of 1977, and dissolved the band to form a more experimental project.

=== First years (1977–1980) ===
In December 1977, Balfe and Gill, influenced by Kraftwerk, formed Dalek I Love You. The name was a compromise: Balfe wanted to call the band the Dalek (after the Doctor Who villains), while Gill wanted to call the band Darling, I Love You. The other founding member was Dave Hughes (keyboards).

In August 1978, the band were joined by Martin Cooper (saxophone), Andy McCluskey (lead vocals and bass, who was previously in the Id), and his Id bandmate, Paul Humphreys on keyboards, along with poets Gordon Hon (a.k.a. "The Worm") and Max the Actor. In September, McCluskey quit with Paul Humphreys to form Orchestral Manoeuvres in the Dark.

Later in 1978, Balfe left the group (to start Zoo Records in Liverpool and manage The Teardrop Explodes & Echo & the Bunnymen, having met his business partner Bill Drummond when he played in Big in Japan at the same time as being in Dalek I Love you. Later Balfe joined the Teardrop Explodes on keyboards.)

By October 1978, only Gill and Hughes remained in the band. As a duo, they signed to Inevitable Records. A demo of "Freedom Fighters" attracted the interest of Phonogram Records, who then signed them.

However, Phonogram shortened the name of the band to Dalek I for the initial releases, and wanted to change the chords of "Freedom Fighters". On 16 July 1979, Dalek I released their first single, "Freedom Fighters", on Phonogram's Vertigo Records subsidiary, containing the eponymous song and B-side "Two Chameleons". It was followed by "The World" (2 October 1979) on Vertigo, and "Dalek I Love You (Destiny)" (1 May 1980), on the Back Door subsidiary, founded by the Blitz Brothers. The latter duo, composed of Chris Hughes and Paul Collister (OMD's then-manager), produced the singles under that name.

Dalek I's debut album, Compass Kumpas (stylized as Compass kum'pəs), was released 24 May 1980 on Back Door/Phonogram. It was critically acclaimed but commercially unsuccessful. By the time of the album's release, Gill was the only remaining member, maintaining the Dalek I Love You name (Dave Hughes having left to join OMD, and then forming the duo Godot with Hartley). The project soon went on hiatus and Gill joined the Teardrop Explodes in July 1980, replacing Mick Finkler. Gill contributed two important things to the band: their most successful single, "Reward", which he co-wrote, and LSD, which he introduced to frontman Julian Cope. His stay with the band was short-lived.

=== Reformation ===
By 1981, Gill had reformed Dalek I Love You, with himself as the sole member. He was augmented by Hugh Jones and Chuca Russo on vocal harmonies, and Chris Hughes on drums for the recording of a single, "Heartbeat", released on 28 February 1981 by Back Door.

By 1983, the band consisted of Gill and returning members Hartley, Hon and Peers, with backing vocalists Chuca Russo, Heather Balshaw and Amanda Hon (née Hawkins). They released an eponymously titled album in November 1983 on the Korova label. Hon left for London to study fine art.

Gill continued making and recording music with local artists, starting his own cassette-only label, Bop a Dub. In 1985, the band released the cassette-only Naive and effectively disbanded shortly afterwards.

The band's first two albums were reissued in the UK on compact disc, Compass Kumpas in 1989 by Fontana Records (with four bonus tracks), and Dalek I Love You in 2007 by Korova (in a remastered and expanded edition).

== Legacy ==
The band inspired the title of Dalek I Love You, a radio drama which premiered on the British digital radio station BBC 7 on 11 February 2006. The story centred on a man obsessed with Doctor Who who falls in love at a science fiction convention. A sequel was produced in 2008 entitled Dalek, I Love You Too.

The band also inspired the title of Dalek I Loved You, an autobiography by the journalist Nick Griffiths about his life as a Doctor Who fan, published in 2007.

== Discography ==
=== Studio albums ===
- Compass Kumpas (1980, Back Door/Phonogram) UK No. 54
- Dalek I Love You (1983, Korova)
- Naive cassette only (1985, Bop a Dub)

=== Singles ===
- "Freedom Fighters" (16 July 1979)
  - 7": Vertigo/Phonogram DALEK 1
- "The World" (2 October 1979)
  - 7": Vertigo/Phonogram DALEK 2
- "Dalek I Love You (Destiny)" (1 May 1980)
  - 7": Back Door/Phonogram DOOR 005
- "Heartbeat" (28 February 1981)
  - 7": Back Door/Phonogram DOOR 10
  - 12": Back Door/Phonogram DOOR 10-12
- "Holiday in Disneyland" (15 July 1982)
  - 7": Korova/WEA KOW 25
  - 12": Korova/WEA KOW 25T
- "Ambition" (18 September 1983)
  - 7": Korova/WEA KOW 29
  - 12": Korova/WEA KOW 29T
- "Horrorscope" (1983)
  - 7": Korova/WEA KOW 31
  - 12": Korova/WEA KOW 31T

=== Compilation appearances ===
- "Dalek I Love You (Destiny)" on Machines (1980, Virgin)
- "Dalek I Love You", "Freedom Fighters" and "The World" on Thru' the Back Door (1980, Mercury)
- "A Suicide" on To the Shores of Lake Placid (1982, Zoo)
- "Freedom Fighters" (demo version) on Small Hits & Near Misses/The Inevitable Compilation (1984, Inevitable/RCA)
- "Everything I Do" on Liverpool...All of This & Heaven Too (1990, Homar)
- "Holiday in Disneyland" on North by North West - Departure 1976 Arrival 1984 (2006, Korova)
