= David Hughes (musician) =

English keyboardist

- Also known as: Dave Hughes; David A. Hughes
- Born: David Alan Hughes; 25 April 1960 (age 66)
- Origin: Birkenhead, Cheshire, England
- Genres: New wave; post-punk; synth-pop; soundtrack
- Occupation: Musician
- Instruments: Keyboards; guitar; bass
- Years active: 1977–present

David Alan Hughes (born 25 April 1960) is an English musician, soundtrack composer, and film producer.

In the late 1970s, 1980s, and early 1990s, he played with various 'post-punk' electronic Merseyside bands, including Dalek I Love You, Orchestral Manoeuvres in the Dark, Godot and Thomas Lang.

From the mid-1980s onwards he built a successful parallel career creating soundtrack music for films and television. His many credits include the films Lock, Stock & Two Smoking Barrels 1998 (a No.1 in the UK box office), The Bachelor (1999 film) (a No.1 in the US Box Office), and for TV, Terry Pratchett's Hogfather 2006 and Terry Pratchett's The Colour of Magic 2008.

In 2009 he expanded into Film Production, co-producing the film Awaydays and several UK independent films.

== Biography ==
=== Musician - 1977 to 1994 ===
A self-taught musician, David Hughes was born in Birkenhead, England. He co-founded Dalek I Love You in December 1977, along with guitarist Alan Gill and David Balfe. After Balfe's departure (to Zoo Records), he and Gill signed to Phonogram records in late 1978. There they released three singles and their debut album, Compass Kumpas. Hughes left the band in January 1980, before they started recording their second album for Warner Bros.

In January 1980 he joined Orchestral Manoeuvres in the Dark on keyboards, with whom he'd previously played when they'd joined Dalek I Love You for a short period earlier, becoming the group's fourth member. He then went out on OMD's first headlining tour, played with them on the Old Grey Whistle Test and performed the hit single Messages on Top of the Pops. Among the recordings including Hughes are the band's second Peel Sessions and the backing tracks for the song "Souvenir". Hughes left OMD in November 1980. "Souvenir" was released as a single in August 1981 and on the Architecture and Morality album in November 1981.

After leaving OMD, he joined with Keith Hartley to form Godot. The duo released an EP, Extended Player, in 1981. However, later that year, Hartley joined Alan Gill in a reformed Dalek I Love You. So, Hughes brought new members into Godot - Freeze Frame members Ronnie Stone on guitar and Steve Byrne on vocals. Martin Cooper, who replaced Hughes in OMD, joined on saxophone (after playing it on the EP), and a drummer. The band toured with Dalek I Love You, but shortly afterwards, Stone started playing with China Crisis, and Godot split up. In August 1982, "Something's Missing", their last single, was released by Pinnacle Records.

Subsequently Hughes played live with synthpop band Games. He also toured and recorded with The Lotus Eaters (band).

In 1983 Hughes started a recording studio in Birkenhead, called Corndon House, where he also engineered.

While there, Hughes met a singer with a cabaret-style band, Thomas Jones. The two went on to form a songwriting and recording duo, making jazzy sophisticated pop. After appearing on prestige music show The Tube (TV series) and performing a residency at Ronnie Scott's Jazz Club in Soho, London, they were signed to CBS by legendary A&R man Muff Winwood and changed the act's name to Thomas Lang (singer).

Thomas Lang went on to record and release two albums on CBS - Scallywag Jaz (1987) & Little Moscow (1990). Then a third album on Dry Communications, titled The Lost Letter Z (1993). They had a UK Top 50 hit with the single, The Happy Man, off Scallywag Jaz. Having not achieved the commercial success they hoped for, they called a halt in 1994.

=== Soundtrack Composer - 1983 to Present ===
From 1983 to 2019 Hughes composed the soundtracks for approximately fifty films and television productions, including the major titles cited in the introduction above. (For more details see the David A. Hughes' IMDB page.)

For his first two films he worked with Martin Cooper (from OMD). Thereafter, until 1999, he worked in partnership with John Murphy (composer), who'd been the bass player for the Thomas Lang live and recording band. From 2000 onwards, Hughes composed all his soundtrack work alone.

=== Film Producer - 2009 to Present ===
Beginning with Awaydays in 2009, Hughes has co-produced independent feature films with his company, Red Union Films.

In 2011, they released 'Powder', in 2015 'The Violators', and are currently working on another feature to be filmed in Anglesey in early 2024.

== Discography ==
With Dalek I Love You:

- "Freedom Fighters" single (1979)
- "The World" single (1980)
- "Dalek I Love You (Destiny)" single (1980)
- Compass kum'pəs (1980)

With Orchestral Manoeuvres in the Dark Peel Sessions 1979-1983 (tracks 5-8):

- Pretending To See The Future
- Enola Gay
- Dancing
- Motion And Heart
