= Doctor Who at the BBC: The Plays =

Compilation album
- Released: 4 September 2006

Doctor Who at the BBC: The Plays is a compilation album of three original BBC audio dramas inspired by the effect of the long-running British science fiction television series Doctor Who on its fans and others. The plays were originally broadcast separately on BBC Radio on various dates, and the compilation was released to audio CD on 4 September 2006.

== Plays ==
=== Regenerations by Daragh Carville ===
Love and sexuality issues affect a group of friends as they prepare for an annual Doctor Who convention. This play features appearances by Sophie Aldred and Tom Baker.

=== Blue Veils and Golden Sands by Martyn Wade ===
A dramatisation of the early days of original Doctor Who theme music performer Delia Derbyshire (Sophie Thompson) at the BBC Radiophonic Workshop.

=== Dalek I Love You by Colin Sharp ===
A man obsessed with Doctor Who brings home a mysterious woman he met at a science fiction convention to meet his mother (Charlie Hardwick). It was originally broadcast on BBC 7 on 11 February 2006 and directed by Carrie Rooney. The title is taken from the 1970s synthpop group Dalek I Love You, which itself is named in part after Doctor Who's Daleks.
