= Thomas Lang (singer) =

English singer-songwriter

Thomas Lang (Thomas Jones) is an English, Liverpool-based singer-songwriter, best known for the jazz-tinged song "The Happy Man", which spent three weeks in the UK Singles Chart in January 1988, peaking at No. 67. He released his debut album, Scallywag Jaz in 1987. His last album release (to date) was The German Alphabet released in September 2016. Lang opened for Nina Simone at the royal festival hall and has worked with many of the jazz greatest artists. His bass player John murphy and Co writer David A Hughes went on to compose many film scores including lock stock and snatch and used him on the movie the Batchelor

Lang toured with his band throughout the late 1980s and early 1990s, and built up a loyal following, as well as appearing with Jools Holland's band on the TV show The Happening in 1990, and several residencies at the world-famous London jazz venue, Ronnie Scott's. Lang still plays live in the UK and occasionally further afield.

He was one of the consortium who successfully battled to save Liverpool's Parr Street Recording Studios (a studio known for its work with Coldplay, Doves, Embrace, Elbow and Badly Drawn Boy).

On 25 August 2006, Lang duetted with fellow Liverpool singer Jennifer John on the anthemic "You'll Never Walk Alone" at Liverpool's Matthew Street Music Festival.

He returned to the recording studio in Liverpool at the end of October 2006 and started recording new songs. The first tracks to be recorded were "Scared" and "I Believe".

In March 2014, Lang released the live album Torch, which was recorded on 16 April 2011 at the Rodewald Suite, in Liverpool Philharmonic Hall.

Lang released his 10th album in 2016 “the German Alphabet” and is currently working on a new project soon to be heard.

== Discography ==
=== Albums ===
- 1987: Scallywag Jaz - UK No. 92
- 1988: Fingers & Thumbs (North America release of Scallywag Jaz)
- 1990: Little Moscow
- 1991: The Lost Letter Z
- 1991: Lang Tokyo 1991 (Live album)
- 1994: Covers
- 1996: Versions
- 2014: Torch (Live album)
- 2016: The German Alphabet
- 2017: The Scallywag Jaz 2 CD 30 Years Anniversary

Compilations

- 1993: Outside Over There - A Retrospective
- 1998: Scallywag Jaz And More - The Best Of...

Soundtracks

- 1993: Leon The Pig Farmer
- 1999: The Bachelor

=== Singles ===
- 1987: "The Happy Man" written by Martin Anderson
- 1987: "Me & Mrs Jones" be Billy Paul
- 1987: "Boys Prefer" by Thomas Lang
- 1988: "The Happy Man" (New Version)- UK No. 67 by Anderson/Lang
- 1990: "Refugees from Little Moscow"
- 1990: "The Longest Song"
- 1991: "I Will" by T Jones
- 1992: "Feels So Right"
- 1992: "Don't Let Me Be Misunderstood" by Benjamin, Ott and Marcus
- 1994: "Love TKO" (Promo)
- 1996: "Use Me" by T Lang
- 2011: "August Day" by Daryl Hall and Sara Allen
