= Orchestral Manoeuvres in the Dark =

English band

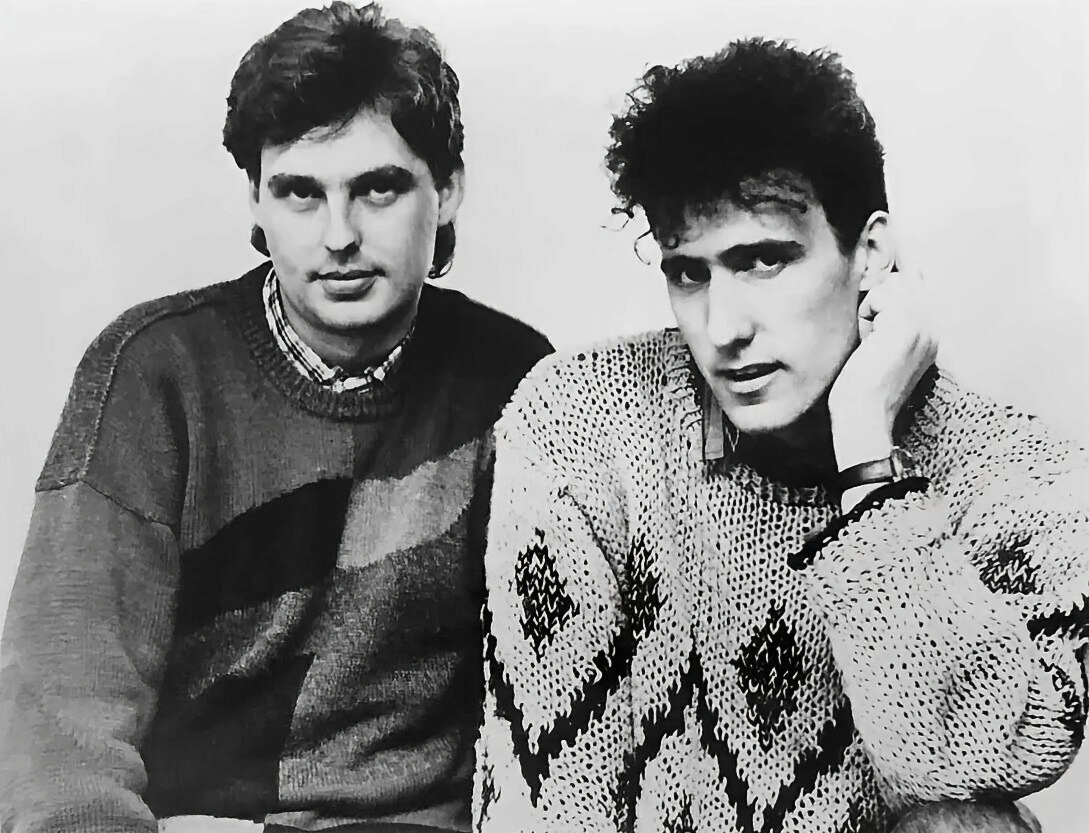
- Founding duo Paul Humphreys (left) and Andy McCluskey in 1985

Background information
- Also known as: OMD
- Origin: Meols, Merseyside, England
- Genres: Electronic; synth-pop; experimental; new wave
- Works: Discography
- Years active: 1978–1996; 2006–present
- Labels: 100%; Virgin; Dindisc; Factory; Bright Antenna; A&M; Epic
- Spinoffs: The Listening Pool; Atomic Kitten; Onetwo
- Spinoff of: The Id; Dalek I Love You
- Members: Andy McCluskey; Paul Humphreys; Martin Cooper; Stuart Kershaw
- Past members: Malcolm Holmes; Dave Hughes; Nigel Ipinson; Michael Douglas; Graham Weir; Neil Weir; Phil Coxon; Abe Jukes
- Website: omd.uk.com

Orchestral Manoeuvres in the Dark (OMD) are an English electronic band formed in Meols, Merseyside in 1978 by Andy McCluskey (vocals, bass guitar) and Paul Humphreys (keyboards, vocals). Regarded as pioneers of electronic music, the group combined an experimental, minimalist ethos with pop sensibilities, becoming key figures in the emergence of synth-pop. OMD were Britain's first performing, two-piece synthesizer band and have been described as the "original synth-pop duo"; despite a shifting line-up, the central pairing of McCluskey and Humphreys remains the group's primary identifier. In the United States, the band were an early presence in the MTV-driven Second British Invasion.

McCluskey and Humphreys led the Id, a precursor group, from 1977 to 1978 and re-recorded their track "Electricity" as OMD's debut single in 1979. Weathering an "uncool" image and a degree of hostility from music critics, the band achieved popularity throughout Europe with the 1980 anti-war song "Enola Gay", and gained further recognition via Architecture & Morality (1981) and its three hit singles. Although later reappraised, Dazzle Ships (1983) was seen as overly experimental, and eroded European support. OMD embraced a more radio-friendly sound on Junk Culture (1984); this change in direction led to greater success in the US, and spawned hits including "If You Leave" (from the 1986 film Pretty in Pink). Some journalists dubbed McCluskey and Humphreys the "Lennon–McCartney of synth-pop".

In 1989, Humphreys and longtime group members Martin Cooper (keyboards, saxophone) and Malcolm Holmes (drums) departed to form the spin-off band the Listening Pool, leaving McCluskey as the sole member of OMD. The group returned with a new line-up and explored the dance-pop genre: Sugar Tax (1991) and its initial singles were hits in Europe. OMD then began to flounder amid the guitar-oriented grunge and Britpop movements, eventually disbanding in 1996. McCluskey later founded girl group Atomic Kitten, for whom he served as a principal songwriter and producer, while Humphreys formed the duo Onetwo alongside lead vocalist Claudia Brücken of Propaganda.

In 2006, OMD reformed with McCluskey and Humphreys revisiting the more experimental territory of their early work. The band have achieved 14 top-20 entries on the UK Albums Chart, as well as global sales of 40 million records. Their 20th century output yielded 18 top-40 appearances on the UK Singles Chart, along with four top-40 entries on the US Billboard Hot 100. Described as one of the most influential synth-pop acts in history, OMD have inspired many artists across diverse genres and disciplines. In 2015, the group established their most enduring line-up, with McCluskey and Humphreys being complemented by Cooper and Stuart Kershaw (drums).

== History ==
=== 1975–1979: Roots and early years ===
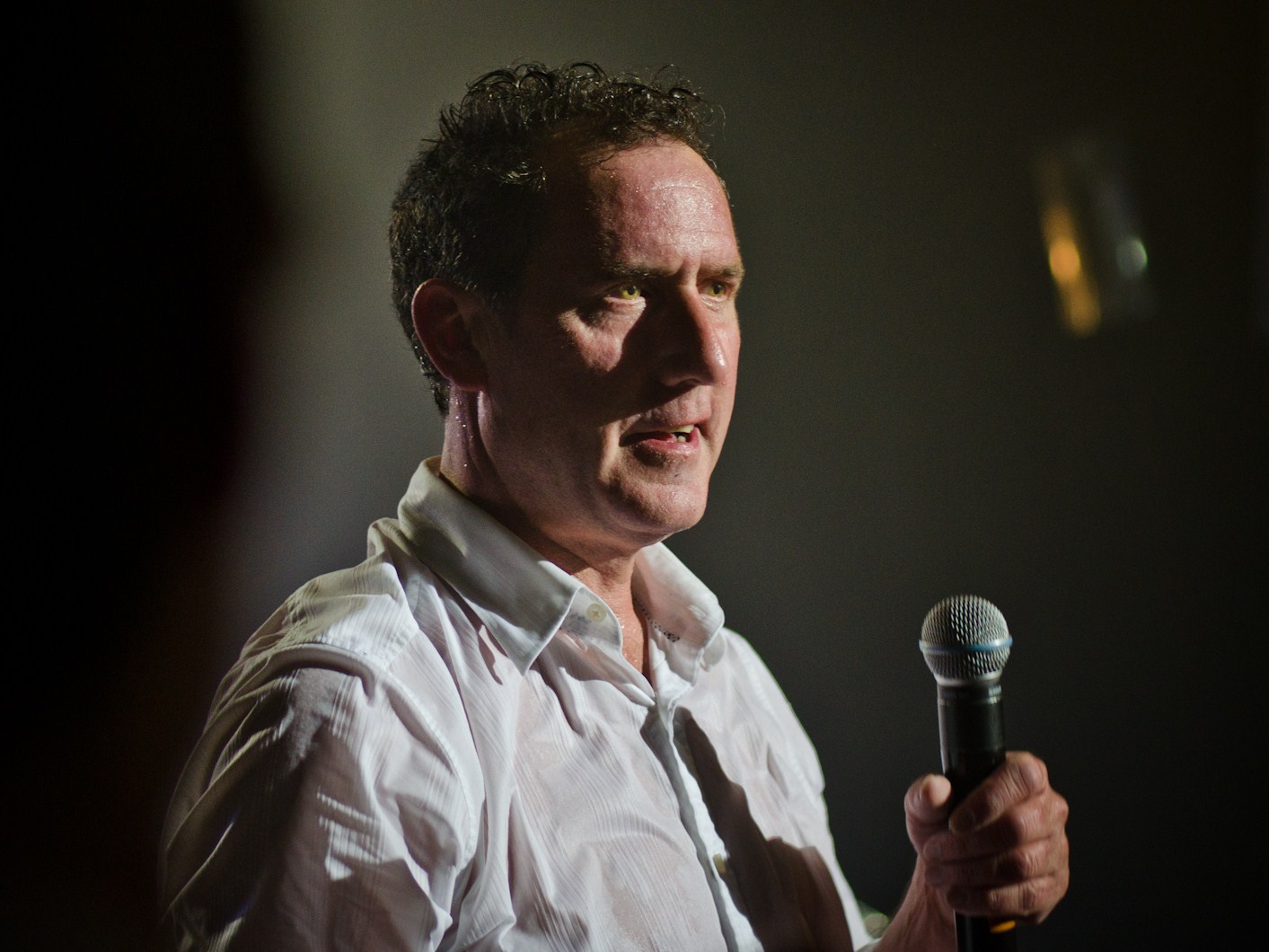
Lead vocalist and co-founder Andy McCluskey in 2011

Founders Andy McCluskey and Paul Humphreys met at primary school in Meols, England in the early 1960s, and in the mid-1970s, as teenagers, they were involved with various local groups. By 1975, McCluskey had formed Equinox as bassist and lead vocalist, alongside schoolmate Malcolm Holmes on drums, while Humphreys was roadie. During that time, McCluskey and Humphreys discovered their electronic style, inspired by German band Kraftwerk. After Equinox, McCluskey joined Pegasus, and, later, the short-lived Hitlerz Underpantz, alongside Humphreys. McCluskey would usually sing and play bass guitar; roadie and electronics enthusiast Humphreys, who shared McCluskey's love of electronic music, graduated to keyboards.

In September 1977, McCluskey and Humphreys put together the seven-piece (three vocalists, two guitarists, bassist, drummer, and keyboardist) Wirral band the Id, whose line-up included drummer Malcolm Holmes and McCluskey's girlfriend Julia Kneale on vocals. The group began to gig regularly in the Merseyside area, performing original material (largely written by McCluskey and Humphreys). They had quite a following on the scene, and one of their tracks ("Julia's Song") was included on a compilation album of local bands called Street to Street – A Liverpool Album (1979). Meanwhile, Humphreys and McCluskey collaborated on a side project called VCL XI, whose name was adapted from a diagram on the back cover of Kraftwerk's fifth studio album Radio-Activity (1975), reading "VCL 11". This project allowed them to pursue their more obscure electronic experiments.

In August 1978, the Id broke up due to musical differences. Also in August, McCluskey joined Wirral electronic outfit Dalek I Love You as lead vocalist, but quit in September. Later in the month, he rejoined Humphreys and their VCL XI project was renamed Orchestral Manoeuvres in the Dark. The name was gleaned from a list of song lyrics and ideas that were written on McCluskey's bedroom wall; and was chosen so they would not be mistaken for a punk band. Given that OMD intended to play only one gig, the duo considered their moniker to be inconsequential. McCluskey has since expressed regret over choosing "such a very silly name". The contrasting personalities of Humphreys and McCluskey established the band's dynamic, with the former saying that "two Pauls wouldn't get anything done and two Andys would kill each other." They have further described their creative roles as "The Surgeon" (Humphreys) and "The Butcher" (McCluskey). As working-class youngsters, OMD had a limited budget, using second-hand "junk-shop" instruments including a left-handed bass guitar (which McCluskey would play upside-down). The pair also created their own devices, with Humphreys "making things out of his aunt's radios cannibalised for the circuit boards". Eventually, they acquired a basic Korg M-500 Micro Preset synthesizer, purchased via McCluskey's mother's mail-order catalogue for £7.76 a week, paid over 36 weeks.

The public phone box they used as a makeshift office during this time became the subject of the song "Red Frame/White Light", and has become a minor tourist attraction after it was decorated by OMD cover artist John Petch.

OMD began to gig regularly as a duo, performing to backing tracks played from a TEAC 4-track tape-recorder christened "Winston" (after the antihero of George Orwell's novel Nineteen Eighty-Four). Their debut performance was in October 1978 at Eric's Club in Liverpool. Finding themselves on the cusp of an electronic new wave in British pop music, they released a one-off single, "Electricity", with independent label Factory Records. The track was supposed to be produced by the Factory Records producer Martin Hannett. However, the A-side was the band's original demo produced by their friend, owner of Winston and soon to be manager, Paul Collister, under the pseudonym Chester Valentino (taken from a nightclub called Valentino's in the nearby city of Chester). The single's sleeve was designed by Peter Saville, whose distinctive graphics contributed to OMD's public image into the 1980s. "Electricity" became a seminal release within the burgeoning synth-pop movement, and led to the band receiving a seven-album recording contract with Dindisc, worth over £250,000.

In 1979, OMD were asked to support Gary Numan on his first major British tour. Humphreys noted, "[Numan] gave us our first big break. He saw us opening for Joy Division and he asked us to go on tour with him... we went from the small clubs to playing huge arenas. Gary was very good to us." Along with Numan, OMD became key figures in the rise of synth-pop. Numan later supported OMD on a 1993 UK arena tour.

=== 1980–1988: Classic line-up ===
"Musically, we were pushing boundaries as far as we could. At one Virgin meeting, the head of A&R asked us, 'Come on guys, are you [Karlheinz] Stockhausen or ABBA?' Andy and I said together, 'Can't we be both?'"

— Paul Humphreys

Rather than hire studio time to record their eponymous debut album (1980), McCluskey and Humphreys used their advance payment from Dindisc to build their own Liverpool recording studio, called the Gramophone Suite. They predicted that they would be dropped by the label due to disappointing sales, but would at least own a studio. The album showcased the band's live set at the time, and included some guest drums from former Id drummer Malcolm Holmes and saxophone from former Dalek I Love You member Martin Cooper. It had a raw, poppy, melodic synth-pop sound. Dindisc arranged for the song "Messages" to be re-recorded (produced by Gong bassist Mike Howlett) and released as a single—it gave the band their first hit. Dave Hughes (another Dalek I Love You alumnus), who joined OMD in 1980, is featured in the "Messages" music video. A tour followed; Winston was augmented with live drums from Malcolm Holmes, and Dave Hughes played synthesizers. Hughes left OMD in late 1980.

The band's second studio album, Organisation (a reference to the band which preceded Kraftwerk, founded by Kraftwerk's original members Florian Schneider-Esleben and Ralf Hütter), followed later that year, recorded as a three-piece with Humphreys, McCluskey and Holmes. It was again produced by Howlett, and had a darker, moodier feel largely inspired by the passing of Joy Division lead vocalist and former Factory label-mate Ian Curtis. The album included the anti-war hit single "Enola Gay", named after the plane that dropped an atomic bomb on Hiroshima. The song was intended to be included on the debut studio album, but was left out at the final selection. The tour for this album had a four-piece band line-up, with Martin Cooper recruited for keyboard duties and enlisted as an official group member. The McCluskey/Humphreys/Cooper/Holmes unit came to be regarded as the band's "classic" line-up. In early 1981, readers of Record Mirror voted OMD the fourth-best band and eighth-best live act of 1980; NME and Sounds readers named the group the eighth and 10th best new act of the year, respectively. In Smash Hits, they were voted both the fifth-best band of 1980 and the eighth-hottest new act for 1981.

Howlett then presided over the recording of a further hit single, "Souvenir", co-written by Cooper and Humphreys. It ushered in a lush choral electronic sound. The song also became OMD's biggest UK hit to date. The band's third studio album, Architecture & Morality, was released in the UK and Europe in November 1981, becoming their most commercially successful studio album. The group went into the studio with Richard Manwaring producing. Cooper then temporarily dropped out and was replaced by Mike Douglas, but this change was reversed by the time the album was released and a tour followed. The album's sound saw OMD's original synth-pop sound augmented by the use of the Mellotron (an instrument previously associated with progressive rock bands), adding atmospheric swatches of string, choir, and other sounds to their palette. Two more hit singles, "Joan of Arc" and "Maid of Orleans" (which became the biggest-selling single of 1982 in Germany) were on the album. Both songs were originally titled "Joan of Arc"; the name of the latter single was changed to Maid of Orleans (The Waltz Joan of Arc) at the insistence of the publishers and to avoid confusion. Readers of Smash Hits voted OMD the seventh-best group of 1981, while Record Mirror readers named them the eighth-best band (as well as the 10th-best "new artist") and the third-best live act of the year. The group came close to breaking up in 1982, with McCluskey later saying, "We had never expected the success, we were exhausted."

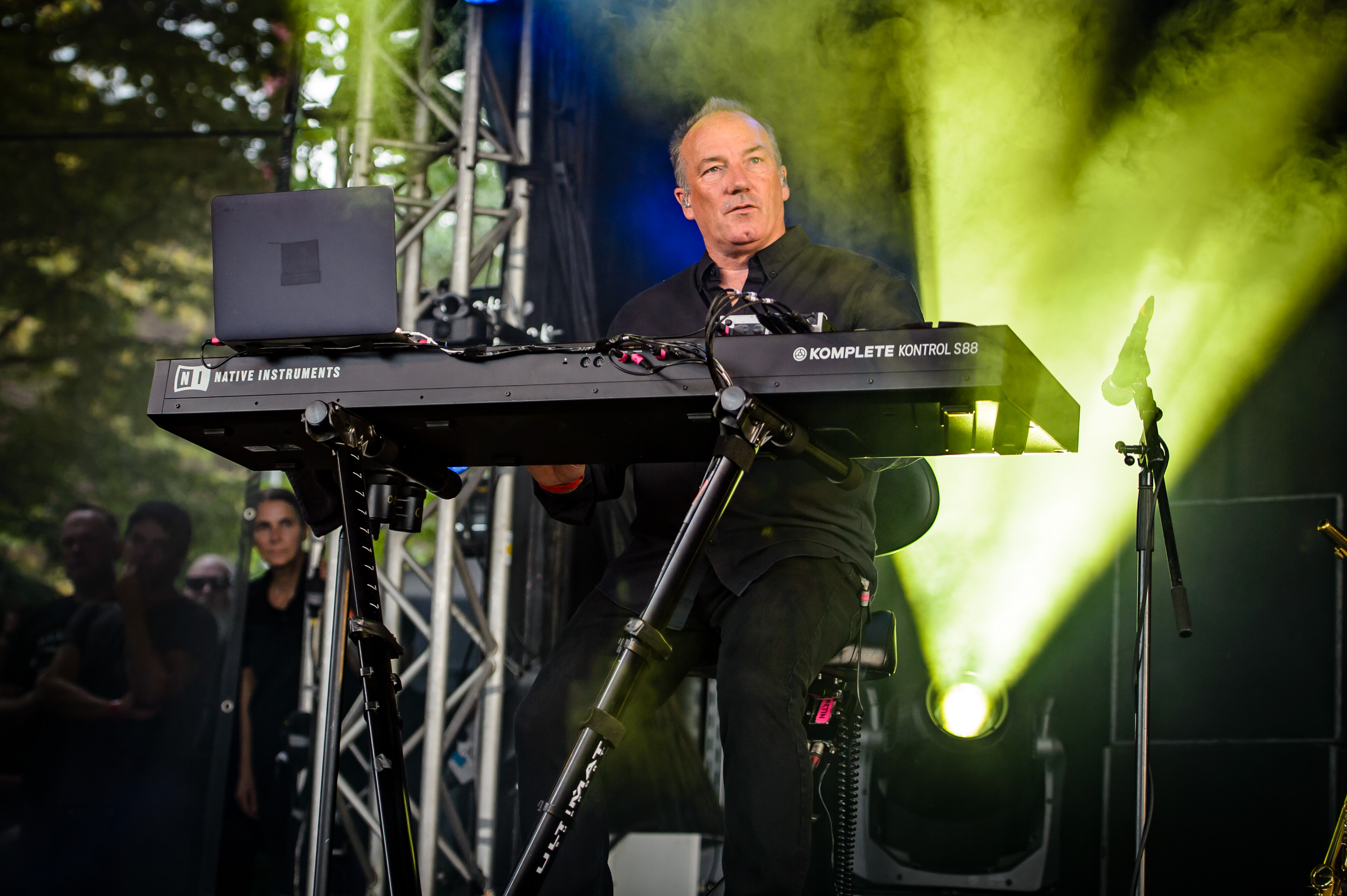
Longtime instrumentalist Martin Cooper in 2018

In 1983, the band lost commercial momentum somewhat, with the release of their more experimental fourth studio album Dazzle Ships, produced by Rhett Davies, perhaps best known for his previous work with Roxy Music and Brian Eno. The record mixed melancholy synth ballads and uptempo synth-pop with musique concrète and short wave radio tape collages. Its relative commercial failure caused a crisis of confidence for Humphreys and McCluskey, and brought about a deliberate move towards the mainstream. Their following studio album, 1984's Junk Culture, was a shift to a more pop-style sound, and the band used digital sampling keyboards such as the Fairlight CMI and the E-mu Emulator. The album was a success, reassuring the group about their new direction. The "Locomotion" single returned them to the top five in the UK. Record Mirror readers named OMD the eighth-best live act of 1984.

In 1985, the band expanded to a sextet with the addition of brothers Graham Weir (guitar, keyboards, trombone) and Neil Weir (keyboards, trumpet, bass guitar), and released their sixth studio album, Crush, produced by Stephen Hague in Paris and New York. Sessions were strained, with Humphreys briefly quitting the group. OMD had been an early presence in the Second British Invasion of the US, but achieved their first Billboard Hot 100 hit with the no. 26 entry "So in Love". This led to some success for Crush, which entered the American Top 40. Later in 1985, the band were asked to write a song for the John Hughes film Pretty in Pink (1986). They offered "Goddess of Love", although the ending of the film was re-shot due to a negative response from test audiences. OMD then wrote "If You Leave" in less than 24 hours, and it became a top 5 hit in the US, Canada, and New Zealand. The OMD track "Tesla Girls" had appeared in Hughes' Weird Science (1985).

In September 1986, the same six piece line-up also released their seventh studio album, The Pacific Age, but the band began to see their critical and public popularity wane notably in the UK. The album's first single, "(Forever) Live and Die", was a top 10 hit across Europe and entered the top 20 in both the UK and US. On 18 June 1988, OMD supported Depeche Mode at the Rose Bowl in Pasadena, California where they played to over 60,000 people. They also released the top 20 US hit "Dreaming" and a successful greatest hits album, The Best of OMD. Graham and Neil Weir left the group at the end of the 1988 US tour.

=== 1989–1996: McCluskey-led OMD and disbandment ===
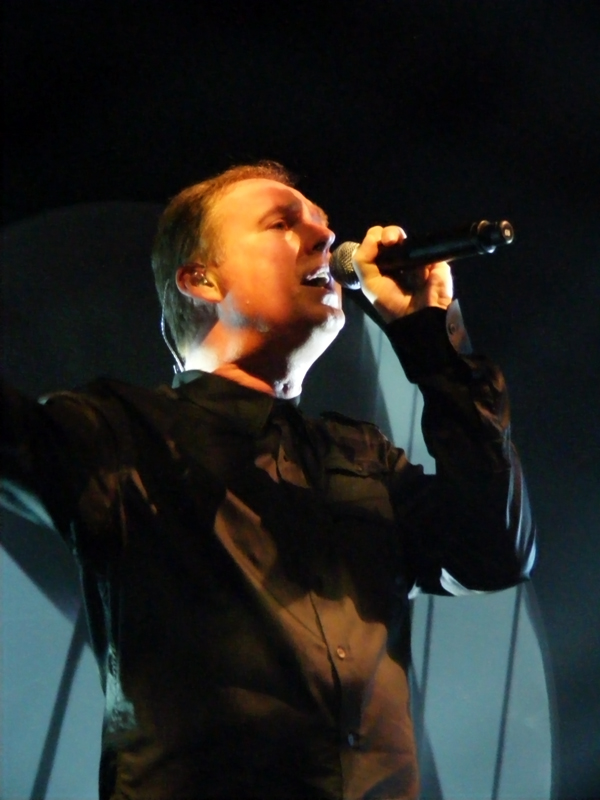
Keyboardist and co-founder Paul Humphreys departed in 1989.

As OMD appeared poised to consolidate their US success, the band continued to fracture. Humphreys departed in 1989 amid personal and creative dissension with McCluskey. Cooper and Holmes then left OMD to join Humphreys in founding a new band called the Listening Pool. McCluskey recalled, "We were all in agreement that something was wrong. How to fix it was where we disagreed."

Only McCluskey was left to carry on, essentially becoming a solo artist working under the OMD banner. McCluskey's first album from the new OMD was the dance-pop studio album Sugar Tax in May 1991, which charted at No. 3 in the UK. McCluskey recruited Liverpool musicians Raw Unlimited (Lloyd Massett, Stuart Kershaw, Nathalie Loates) as collaborators for the making of Sugar Tax; writing credits carefully distinguished between songs written by OMD (i.e., McCluskey) and songs written by OMD/Kershaw/Massett. This iteration of the group was initially successful, with hits such as "Sailing on the Seven Seas" and "Pandora's Box", with lesser success on fellow chart entries "Call My Name" and "Then You Turn Away". McCluskey's live band was then composed of Nigel Ipinson (keyboards), Phil Coxon (keyboards), and Abe Juckes (drums) from late 1990. Smash Hits readers voted OMD the sixth-best British group of 1991.

The group's next studio album was 1993's Liberator, which ventured further into dance territory. It peaked at No. 14 on the UK Albums Chart. The lead single "Stand Above Me" peaked at no. 21 on the UK Singles Chart, with a follow-up single, "Dream of Me", charting at no. 24. Paul Humphreys was credited as co-writer of the single "Everyday" (a No. 59 UK chart entry). The fifth track from Liberator, "Dream of Me", was built around a sample from "Love's Theme" by Love Unlimited Orchestra, a song written and produced by Barry White. To release the track as an OMD single, however, McCluskey had to agree that the single release would remove the actual "Love's Theme" sample, but still be officially titled "Dream of Me (Based on Love's Theme)", and furthermore would still give a writing credit to White.

Also in 1993, McCluskey made contributions to the Elektric Music album Esperanto, a project by former Kraftwerk member Karl Bartos. McCluskey returned with a rotating cast of musicians for the more organic Universal (1996), which featured two songs co-written by Humphreys as well as a holdover from the Esperanto sessions, co-written by Bartos. The record spawned OMD's first Top 20 hit in five years, "Walking on the Milky Way".

Although both Liberator and Universal produced minor hits, McCluskey retired OMD in late 1996, having faced waning public interest amid the grunge and Britpop movements. A particular source of frustration was the modest commercial response to "Walking on the Milky Way", over which McCluskey said he "sweated blood", considering it "about as good a song as I could write". However, the track was not playlisted by BBC Radio 1, and Woolworths did not stock it. McCluskey recalled, "I just thought: 'Screw this, I'm not going to bang my head against a brick wall'." A second singles album was released in 1998, along with an EP of remixed material by such acts as Sash! and Moby.

Post-1996, McCluskey decided to focus on songwriting for such Liverpool-based acts as Atomic Kitten and Genie Queen, and trying to develop new Merseyside artists from his Motor Museum recording studio. With McCluskey focusing his talents elsewhere, Humphreys decided to work with his new musical partner Claudia Brücken (of the ZTT bands Propaganda and Act) as Onetwo. He also undertook a US live tour under the banner "Paul Humphreys from OMD".

=== 2006–2012: Reformation and comeback releases ===
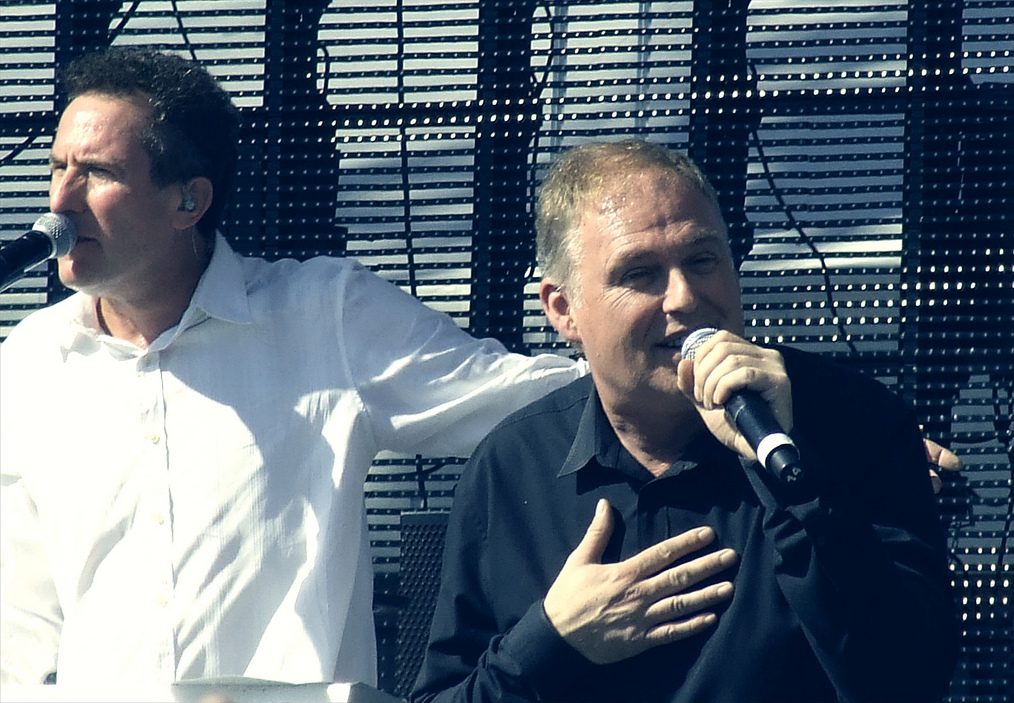
McCluskey and Humphreys performing in 2011

An unexpected request to perform from a German television show led the group to reunite. On 1 January 2006, McCluskey announced plans to reform OMD with the "classic" line-up of McCluskey, Humphreys, Holmes, and Cooper. The original plan was to tour the studio album Architecture & Morality and other pre-1983 material, then record a new studio album set for release in 2007. In May 2007, the Architecture & Morality remastered CD was re-released together with a DVD featuring the Drury Lane concert from 1981 that had previously been available on VHS. The band toured throughout May and June, beginning their set with a re-ordered but otherwise complete re-staging of the Architecture & Morality album. The second half of each concert featured a selection of their best known hits.

A live CD and DVD of the 2007 tour, OMD Live: Architecture & Morality & More, was released in the spring of 2008; it was recorded at the Hammersmith Apollo in London. Also released was a 25th anniversary re-release of Dazzle Ships, including six bonus tracks. To tie-in with the re-release, the band made the brief "Messages 78-08 30th Anniversary Tour", featuring China Crisis as a support act. A cover of Atomic Kitten's 2001 hit, "Whole Again" (which had been co-written by McCluskey), was included on Liverpool – The Number Ones Album (2008), marking OMD's first new studio recording in 12 years.

In June 2009, an orchestral concert with the Royal Liverpool Philharmonic was played in Liverpool; a recording of this concert was released on DVD in December. The band toured arenas in November and December, supporting Simple Minds on their Graffiti Soul Tour. OMD had performed at the Night of the Proms festival in December 2006 in Germany, renewing the experience again in Belgium and the Netherlands that year. They were the headline act at Britain's first Vintage Computer Festival at The National Museum of Computing in June 2010.

McCluskey recalled, "Once we had toured again... there was only one dangerous but logical next step: to be crazy enough to dare to make new music. The process took about three years as we were conscious that a poor album would undermine all of the positive effects that we had achieved in the touring." Pet Shop Boys keyboardist Chris Lowe encouraged their return to the studio, declaring that "the world needs more OMD records". The band's eleventh studio album, History of Modern, was released in September 2010, reaching No. 28 in the UK Albums Chart and being followed by a European tour. Reviews of the album were generally favourable.

On 28 September, OMD performed as a special guest at the "first ever gig" of the Buggles. In March 2011, the band played their first North American tour as the "classic" line-up since 1988. In September, they appeared at the 2011 Electric Picnic festival in Stradbally, Ireland. In November 2011, OMD returned to the studio and started work on their next album, English Electric. On 12 March 2012, the band played a concert in the Philippines at the Araneta Coliseum in Quezon City. In August, OMD performed to South African audiences in Cape Town and Johannesburg.

=== 2013–2019: Return to prominence ===
"Being in Orchestral Manoeuvres in the Dark right now is just the most blessed thing... it's like being 19 again. We can do what the hell we want."

— Andy McCluskey

In 2013, OMD performed at Coachella, a festival in Indio, California, on 14 and 21 April. "Metroland", the first single from the forthcoming studio album English Electric, was released on 25 March 2013. The album was released in the UK on 8 April, and entered the UK album chart at No. 12 and the German chart at No. 10. Reviews for both the album and their concerts were generally positive. "The Future Will Be Silent", a 500-copy limited edition 10-inch picture disc EP from English Electric, was made available for Record Store Day 2013, and included a then-exclusive non-album track titled "Time Burns". For Record Store Day 2015, a 1000-copy limited edition 10-inch EP of "Julia's Song (Dub Version)" from Junk Culture was made available, which includes an exclusive non-album track titled "10 to 1".

OMD performed a one-off concert at the Royal Albert Hall, London on 9 May 2016 to a sell-out crowd, playing both Architecture & Morality and Dazzle Ships in their entirety, along with other songs from before 1983. The only song post-1983 played was "History of Modern Part 1". The concert was recorded and made available on double CD right after the show, with a triple LP vinyl recording of the concert also being made available. The band collaborated with Gary Barlow, Taron Egerton and Hugh Jackman on the OMD song "Thrill Me", co-written by Barlow and McCluskey for the soundtrack of the 2015 film Eddie the Eagle. Work began in October 2015 on what was to be their thirteenth studio album The Punishment of Luxury, which was released on 1 September 2017 and charted at no. 4 in the UK. OMD toured Europe and North America in support of the album, with Stuart Kershaw replacing Holmes as the band's drummer, due to the latter's health issues.

In 2018, OMD published an official book titled Pretending to See the Future, which is a first-person "autobiography" about the band. It mixed fan-submitted memories with commentary from McCluskey, Humphreys, Cooper, Holmes, and Kershaw. For people who pre-ordered the book on PledgeMusic, they received a limited-edition flexi-disc containing a previously unheard demo of "Messages" from 1978.

As part of OMD's 40th-anniversary celebrations, they embarked on a UK and European tour in 2019. The band won "Group of the Year" and "Live Act of the Year" in the 2019 Classic Pop Reader Awards. A retrospective deluxe box set titled Souvenir was also released. The 40th anniversary collection includes the band's forty singles, including a new release titled "Don't Go". It also contains 22 previously unreleased recordings from the group's archive, selected and mixed by Paul Humphreys. Two audio live shows (one from 2011 and one from 2013) are also included, together with two DVDs bringing together two more live concerts (Drury Lane in 1981 and Sheffield City Hall in 1985) plus Crush – The Movie, and various BBC TV performances from Top of the Pops, The Old Grey Whistle Test and Later... with Jools Holland.

=== 2020–present: Continued acknowledgement ===
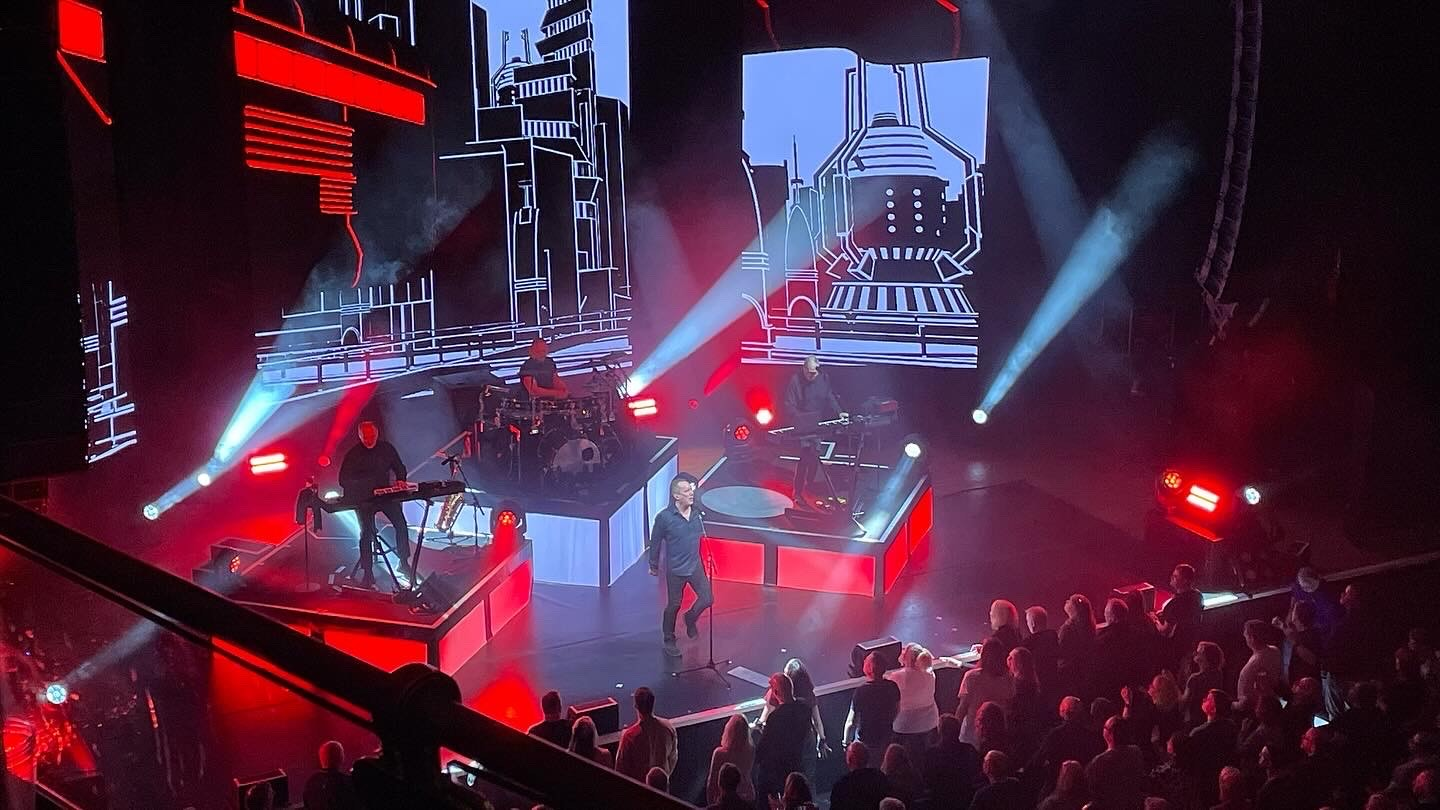
OMD at Sheffield City Hall during 2024 UK Tour

During the COVID-19 lockdown imposed in March 2020, McCluskey "rediscovered the creative power of boredom" and began writing material for OMD's next studio album. In October, the band returned to live performance with a limited-capacity gig at London's indigo at The O2, with proceeds going to their road crew; the event was also streamed online. In 2021, the Souvenir box set was nominated for "Best Historical Album" at the Grammy Awards. Also that year, OMD celebrated the 40th anniversary of 1981's Architecture & Morality with a UK tour, and released a triple-vinyl set of the album's singles containing associated B-sides, demo recordings, and live tracks.

In March 2022, a pair of concerts with a heavy emphasis on the group's more experimental work (rescheduled from September 2020), took place at the Royal Albert Hall, with a live album based on the shows released through the OMD store. Another re-issue of 1983's Dazzle Ships, featuring previously unheard recordings, was announced for a March 2023 release.

OMD's fourteenth studio album, Bauhaus Staircase, was released on 27 October 2023; it was preceded by a single, the title track, on 22 August. The record debuted at no. 2 on the UK Albums Chart, matching the peak achieved by The Best of OMD (1988). McCluskey has said that Bauhaus Staircase is likely to be the band's final album. However, it has been recently announced that a new experimental album is in the works for 2027. Their latest 2024 tour runs from March to October including gigs in the UK, South Africa, Canada and the US.

== Artistry and reception ==
=== Early ethos and presentation ===
"It's kind of like, 'less is more'. We consciously tried to minimise what we were doing."

— Andy McCluskey

Electronic band Kraftwerk served as OMD's primary musical influence: McCluskey credits "Autobahn" (1974) with piquing he and Humphreys' interest in electronic music. Other formative influences included the Velvet Underground, Neu!, Roxy Music, Brian Eno and David Bowie. The pair also drew inspiration from Factory Records label-mates Joy Division, particularly during the making of the goth-inclined Organisation (1980). Disenchanted with the macho guitar rock that was popular among their friends, McCluskey and Humphreys were keen to "slay the rock 'n' roll dragon". Jim Kerr, frontman of late 1970s peers Simple Minds, felt OMD "had somehow arrived almost fully formed and with a talent for spitfire hooks that permeated right through their songs".

Spin wrote that "OMD set about reinventing punk with different applications of dance beats, keyboards, melodies, and sulks", rejecting the genre's "sonic trappings but not its intellectual freedom". The group cultivated a style of synth-pop described as "edgy", "experimental", and "minimal[ist]". Spoons vocalist Gordon Deppe (later guitarist for A Flock of Seagulls) likened OMD to musician Prince in their ability to make a basic chord sequence "sound unique and much more than it really is". He added that the band "pull it off amazingly well, sometimes even borrowing '50s style chord patterns as a basis. But you'd never know it." OMD often eschewed vocal choruses, replacing them with synthesizer lines, and opted for unconventional lyrical subjects such as industrial processes, micronations and telephone boxes; BBC News said the group "were always more intellectual" than contemporaries like Duran Duran and Eurythmics. Despite the band's experimentation, they displayed keen pop sensibilities in their work, attaining what AllMusic described as "the enviable position of at once being creative innovators and radio-friendly pop giants". OMD are noted for their inventive use of sampling, initially via analogue technology and later by digital means.

According to the NRC, OMD are "known as the band that managed to wring emotion from synthesizer pop". The Scotsman stated that "their music, even with its occasionally cerebral themes, has always been defined by warmth, heart and soul: the sound of machinery manipulated by a tender human touch." Musician Vince Clarke felt the group were responsible for educating mainstream audiences that electronic music could have emotion. Michael Grace Jr., founder of indie pop outfit My Favorite, said in 2018, "The thing that strikes me now when I return to OMD is how remarkably human they sound. They are a soul band for an automated age. OMD proposed an honest rendering of the tension, fascination, and occasional terror they felt about how ghosts and machines would get along. It was more Philip K. Dick than Steve Jobs."

PopMatters said the group, despite a shifting line-up, remained "in essence, the songwriting/recording duo of Andy McCluskey and Paul Humphreys" (OMD have continued to perform occasionally as the original two-man unit). The pair wore plain, understated clothing during public appearances, avoiding the calculated fashion stylings of many of their 1980s peers. Onstage, McCluskey developed a frenetic dancing style that has been dubbed the "Trainee Teacher Dance"; he explained that it stemmed "from the perception that [OMD] were making boring robotic intellectual music that you couldn't dance to". Journalists noted that the band were perceived as "oddballs, freaks" and "misfit[s]" on the Liverpool scene, while McCluskey has identified himself and Humphreys as "synth punks" and "complete geeks". OMD weathered an "uncool" image, and faced hostility from sections of the music press. Critic Andrew Collins said, however, that the group would eventually "become cool" to the public.

=== Mid-1980s style change ===
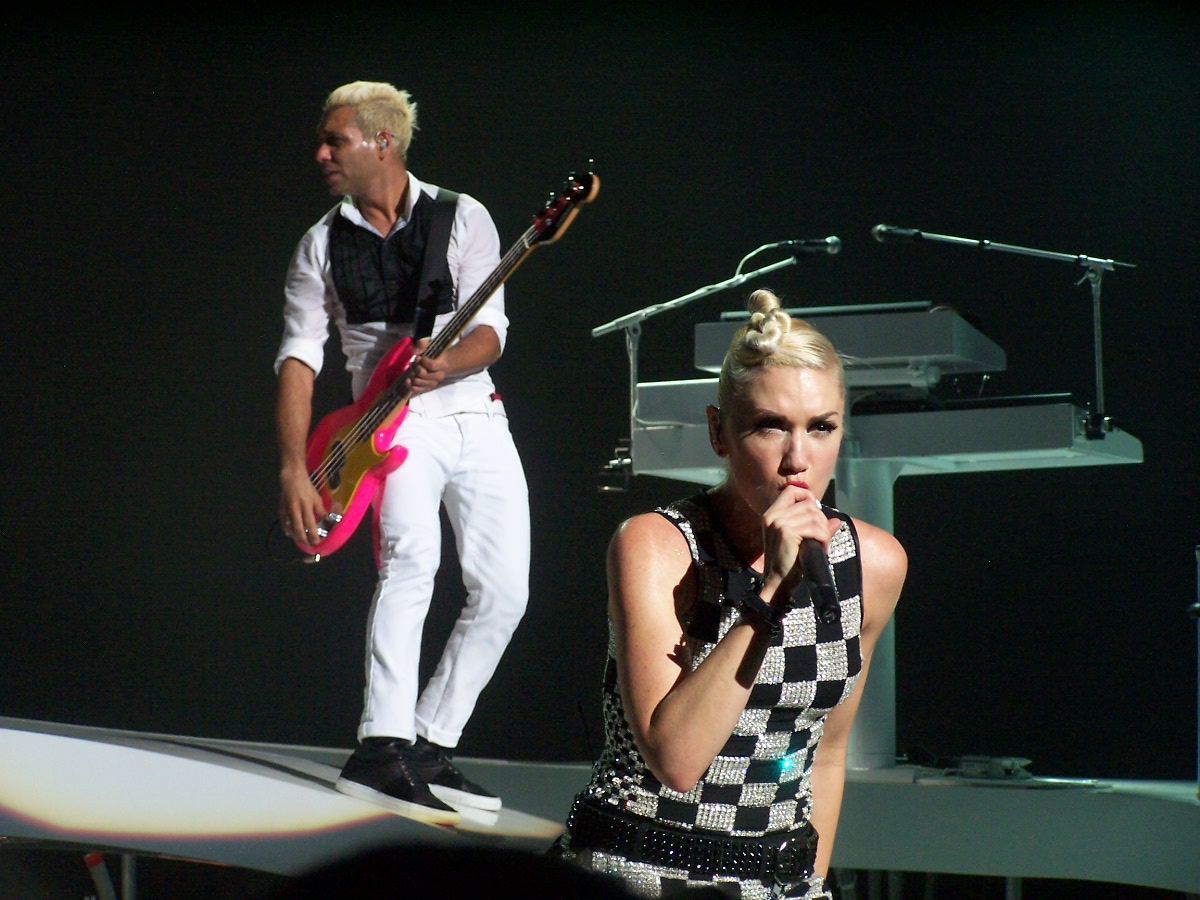
OMD's mid-1980s reinvention was embraced by musicians including Tony Kanal (left) and Gwen Stefani of No Doubt.

Although retrospectively lauded, the experimental Dazzle Ships (1983) was a critical and commercial disappointment upon release. Facing potential excision from Virgin Records, OMD moved towards a more accessible sound on the black music-influenced Junk Culture (1984); they also donned more vibrant garments on the album's accompanying tour. The band continued to incorporate elements of sonic experimentation, although their sound became increasingly polished on the Stephen Hague-produced studio albums Crush (1985) and The Pacific Age (1986).

The Quietus founder John Doran, who was supportive of the group's reinvention, told how it became "quite popular to see OMD as nose-diving into the effluence after Dazzle Ships". Author Richard Metzger refused to "stick up for anything they recorded" afterwards, while the A.V. Club alleged that McCluskey would "give up" following that album. Conversely, music journalist Ian Peel observed "two brilliant, but very different, bands. Orchestral Manoeuvres in the Dark, the early 80s Factory descendents... and OMD, the late 80s stadium pop act." The Miami New Times asserted that "even their poppiest records of that postexperimental era, such as Junk Culture and Crush, were clever and beautifully arranged." Both of those albums were generally well-reviewed.

Musicians have commented on OMD's post-Dazzle Ships output. Moby remarked, "Their earlier records were just phenomenal... a few years on they were making music for John Hughes movies, and they were good at it and I'm glad that they had success with it, but it wasn't nearly as creatively inspiring." On the other hand, No Doubt bassist Tony Kanal told how he and bandmate Gwen Stefani experimented with OMD-esque "John Hughes prom-scene movie moment kind of songs", adding that "Junk Culture is great". Angus Andrew of Liars hoped that tentative listeners would uncover "the complexity and mastery in OMD's later pop material", and declared himself a fan of the group's work across "all of their phases".

The band themselves describe Junk Culture as an enjoyable "collection of songs" as opposed to a "deep, conceptual" record, and argue that Crush features some strong material despite its strained recording sessions; Humphreys has named the latter as one of his favourite OMD works. The group concedes, however, that The Pacific Age was a creative misfire. Critic Jessica Bendinger reflected on OMD's stylistic journey by the late 1980s, saying that "their music has been colored by continual exploration... which has run the gamut from Gregorian-chant-inspired anthems of love to a union of Orchestral-Motown." SF Weekly wrote, "It's hard to think of any 1980s new wave bands that could navigate the genre's spectrum of sound and mood as well as Orchestral Manoeuvres in the Dark."

Wham!'s George Michael was quoted as saying in 1986 that the best concert he and musical partner Andrew Ridgeley had attended, was by OMD.

=== Subsequent reinventions ===
The McCluskey-led OMD explored a dance-oriented approach on Sugar Tax (1991) and Liberator (1993); the latter has since drawn criticism from McCluskey. Ian Peel wrote that the band "defied expectations by updating their sound and becoming, if only briefly, relevant in the 90s". The group disbanded shortly after the release of Universal (1996), on which they strained for a more organic and acoustic sound. In reviewing The OMD Singles (1998), AllMusic asserted that the band "covered in a single career that same territory explored by the Human League, Erasure, Yaz[oo], New Order, and beyond."

Since OMD's 2006 reformation, their material has been seen as more akin to their early output. PopMatters wrote that the group's 21st century oeuvre represents "one of the more successful second acts in modern pop history". The band are recognised for their diverse contributions to the electronic, new wave, experimental, dance and post-punk genres throughout their career. Goldmine stated, however, that "a cumbersome moniker and a somewhat intentional avoiding of the limelight" had rendered the group as "one of rock's most underrated and under-appreciated bands". OMD's work has nevertheless been complimented by peers including Mute Records boss Daniel Miller, the Human League's Philip Oakey, Soft Cell's Marc Almond, Thompson Twins' Tom Bailey, and producer Trevor Horn, who said, "What Orchestral Manoeuvres have achieved over the last few decades – that fusion of pop and electronic experimentation – is unique." Frontman McCluskey has gained the admiration of musicians such as Paul McCartney, John Robb, and Heaven 17's Martyn Ware; Joy Division's Peter Hook labelled him a "really underrated" talent.

OMD have undertaken regular UK and international gigs since they reformed, staging their own tours and also embracing '80s revival festivals such as the Rewind Festival and Heritage Live.

== Legacy and influence ==
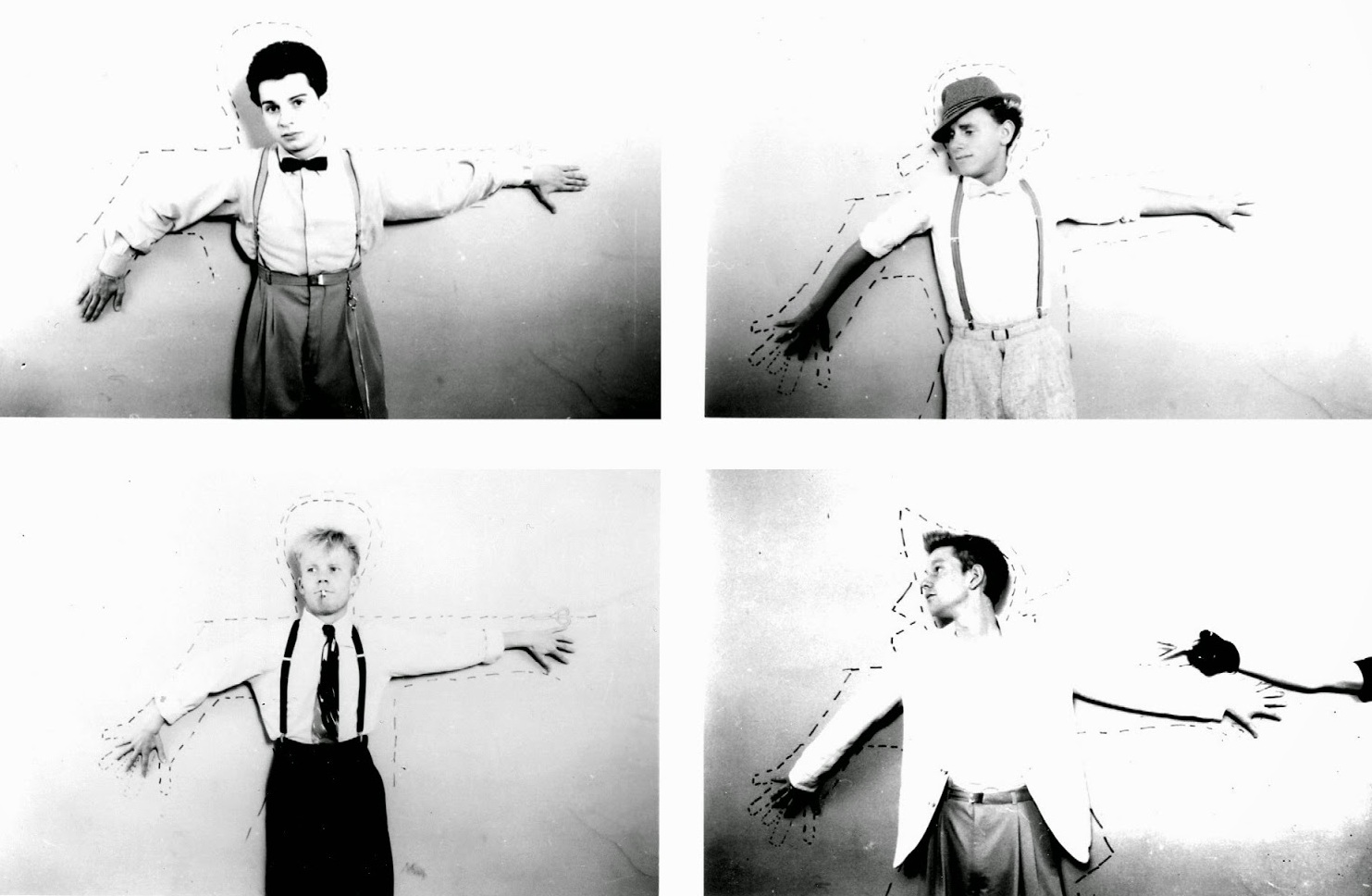
Depeche Mode in 1981; co-founder Vince Clarke (bottom left) said that the band would never have happened without OMD.

Considered one of the most influential synth-pop acts in history, OMD have sold over 40 million records worldwide. (Note: OMD have been recognised by multiple outlets as pioneers of electronic music, and one of the synth-pop genre's most influential acts.) (Note: OMD have sold over 40 million records. In 2019, Music Week reported sales of 15 million albums and 25 million singles.) McCluskey and Humphreys represented Britain's first performing, two-piece synthesizer band and have been described as the "original synth-pop duo". The A.V. Club identified OMD as "one of the earliest synthesizer-driven bands to break out of the post-punk scene and lead the charge toward the defining sound of the [1980s]." PopMatters said the group "gave credibility to ambitious pop" and led to "the emergence of a generation of electronic bands", including Talk Talk, ABC, Blancmange, Simple Minds, and the Vince Clarke projects Depeche Mode, Yazoo and Erasure. Clarke agreed with critics who felt OMD were "ahead of their time", and credited their "really great tunes and ideas" with directly inspiring him to become an electronic musician. (Note: OMD have been described as being ahead of their time, a sentiment with which musician Vince Clarke has concurred.) The Pet Shop Boys bonded over their deep affection for OMD: lead singer Neil Tennant named the group as "pioneers of electronic music"—a viewpoint shared by multiple writers. Some have dubbed McCluskey and Humphreys the "Lennon–McCartney of synth-pop".

OMD impacted 1980s peers such as Howard Jones, Kim Wilde, Tears for Fears, Frankie Goes to Hollywood, A-ha, China Crisis, and Duran Duran, for whom "Electricity" (1979) was an early influence. Alphaville's Marian Gold stated, "It wasn't Kraftwerk: it was OMD that really changed my life." Within rock music, the group directly inspired ZZ Top's introduction of synthesizers and onstage dancing, and helped foster New Order's emergence as an electronic act from 1983. OMD were also influential on U2, whose bassist, Adam Clayton, was a contributor to the band's official 2018 biography. OMD's impact extended to industrial musicians like Nine Inch Nails' Trent Reznor, Skinny Puppy's Nivek Ogre, Ministry's Al Jourgensen, and Front Line Assembly's Rhys Fulber, who observed an "amazing" combination of "art, experimentation and pop".

OMD are noted for their influence on dance music in the 1990s and beyond. The group inspired performers including Orbital, Paul van Dyk, Benny Benassi, Mike "μ-Ziq" Paradinas, and Moby, who cited them as "heroes" and a decisive factor in his career choice. OMD informed a new generation of synth-pop acts such as La Roux and Crystal Castles, and directly inspired the creation of indie band Nation of Language. The group have also influenced rock and pop artists including No Doubt, the Killers, Barenaked Ladies, MGMT, AFI, LCD Soundsystem, Chvrches, the xx, the Shins, Future Islands, Low, Hot Chip, the Divine Comedy, the Magnetic Fields, Ariel Pink, Sharon Van Etten, Robyn, Red Hot Chili Peppers' John Frusciante, Belle and Sebastian's Stevie Jackson, and Take That's Gary Barlow. Singer Anohni said of OMD's Architecture & Morality (1981) and Dazzle Ships (1983): "Those records, they really changed me when I was a kid. I'd never heard anything quite like it... this really scary, futuristic landscape." The experimental Dazzle Ships has impacted artists such as Arcade Fire, Radiohead, Death Cab for Cutie, Saint Etienne, and producer Mark Ronson.

The tribute albums Pretending to See the Future and Messages: Modern Synthpop Artists Cover OMD (both 2001) feature cover versions by acts including White Town, the Faint, Cosmicity, Mahogany and the Acid House Kings. In 2020, singer Boy George streamed a cover of "The View from Here" (2017), adding that he wished he had written the track. Elsewhere, OMD's songs have been interpreted or sampled by artists such as Vince Clarke, Moby, Hot Chip, Leftfield, Xiu Xiu, Angel Olsen, NOFX, Good Charlotte, and John Foxx and the Maths, as well as by the rappers Kid Cudi and Lushlife. The group's influence extends to the metal bands Deftones and Type O Negative, country duo Sugarland, DJ Steve Lamacq, actor/writer Scott Aukerman, novelist Anna Smaill, filmmaker Noah Baumbach, physicist/musician Brian Cox, and the songwriter/producers Steven Wilson and Richard X. Wilson dubbed OMD a "wonderful collision of ideas", whose albums "stand up very, very well as experimental pop records with the most enjoyable kind of songwriting". OMD have received further endorsements from musicians including Kraftwerk's Karl Bartos, Harry Styles, and Gary Numan, who credited the band for "some of the best pop songs ever written".

== Members ==
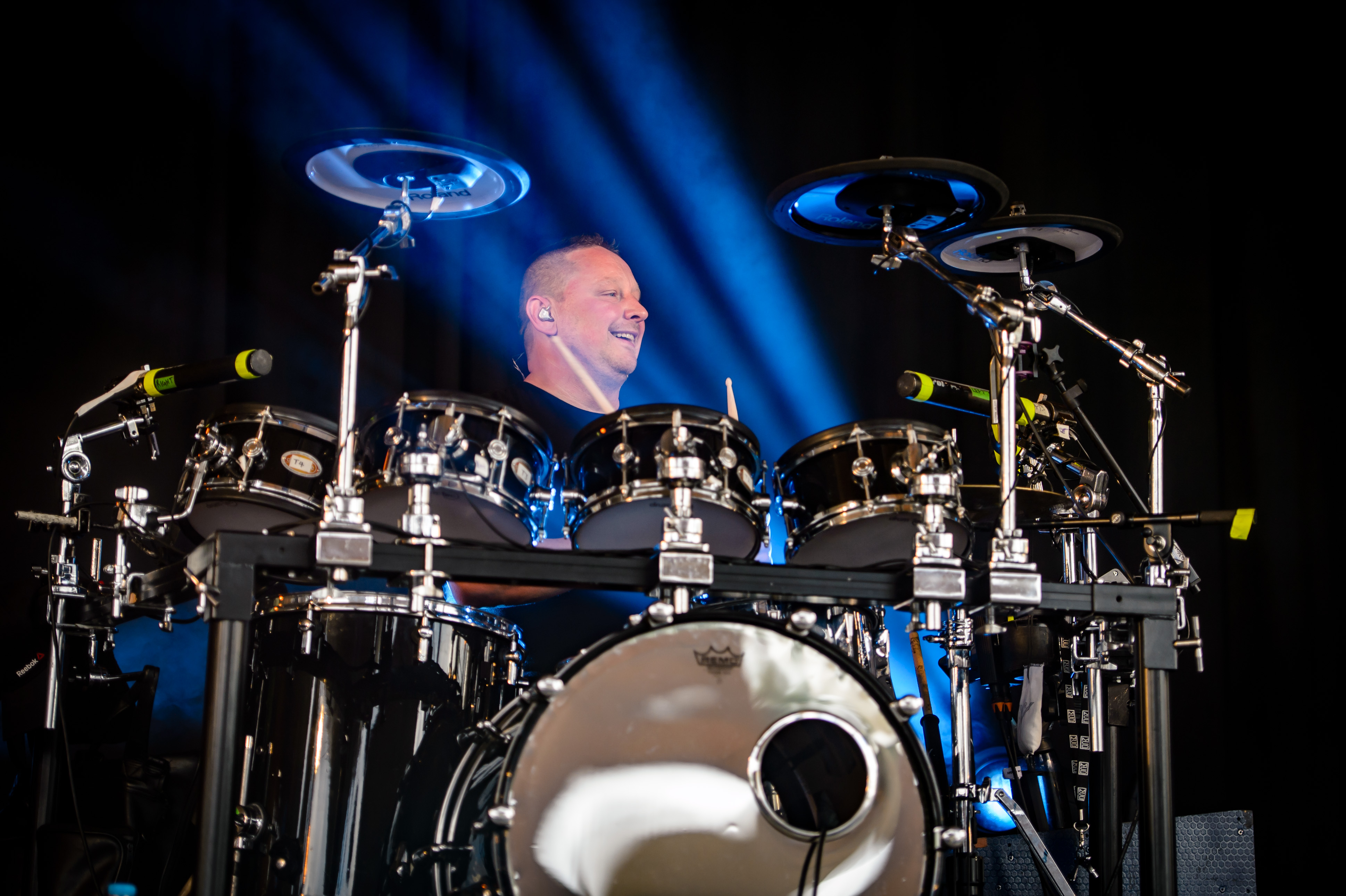
Stuart Kershaw (pictured) replaced longtime drummer Malcolm Holmes in 2015.

=== Current members ===
- Andy McCluskey – vocals, bass, keyboards, guitar (1978–1996; 2006–present)
- Paul Humphreys – keyboards, vocals (1978–1989; 2006–present)
- Martin Cooper – keyboards, saxophone (1980–1989; 2006–present)
- Stuart Kershaw – drums (1993; 2015–present)

=== Former members ===
- Malcolm Holmes – drums, percussion (1980–1989; 2006–2015)
- Dave Hughes – keyboards (1979–1980)
- Michael Douglas – keyboards (1980–1981)
- Graham Weir – guitar, brass, keyboards (1984–1989)
- Neil Weir – brass, keyboards, bass (1984–1989)
- Phil Coxon – keyboards (1991–1993)
- Nigel Ipinson – keyboards (1991–1993)
- Abe Juckes – drums (1991–1992)

== Discography ==
Studio albums

- Orchestral Manoeuvres in the Dark (1980)
- Organisation (1980)
- Architecture & Morality (1981)
- Dazzle Ships (1983)
- Junk Culture (1984)
- Crush (1985)
- The Pacific Age (1986)
- Sugar Tax (1991)
- Liberator (1993)
- Universal (1996)
- History of Modern (2010)
- English Electric (2013)
- The Punishment of Luxury (2017)
- Bauhaus Staircase (2023)
