= Young Parisians =

Single by Adam and the Ants
- A-side: "Young Parisians"
- B-side: "Lady"
- Released: 20 October 1978
- Recorded: Island studios, Basing Street, Notting Hill, 26 August 1978
- Length: 3:01
- Label: Decca Records
- Songwriter: Adam Ant
- Producers: Adam Ant & Jo Julian

Adam and the Ants singles chronology
"Young Parisians" (1978)	"Zerox" (1979)

"Young Parisians" is the debut single from Adam and the Ants, written by Adam Ant. Originally released on 20 October 1978, it was the band's only single on Decca Records.

"Young Parisians" has been included on The Very Best Of Adam and the Ants & Antmusic: The Very Best of Adam Ant. A demo version is the lead track on the first disc of the Antbox three CD set.

== Reception ==
At the time, the band were combining the punk sound of their earliest days with a more experimental ethos which would characterise their 1979 debut Dirk Wears White Sox and, to some extent, its 1980 follow-up Kings of the Wild Frontier (by which time only Adam Ant remained from the line-up of the debut single).

"Young Parisians" was an acoustic cabaret-style number with the accordion as its lead instrument. It was deliberately chosen as a single to confuse people who viewed Adam and the Ants as a punk band. Ant later admitted that this was probably a mistake and that "Lady" should have been the leading track.

In December 1980, following the initial success of Kings of the Wild Frontier and its singles "Dog Eat Dog" and 'Antmusic', the single was re-promoted in the UK, reaching #9 on the UK Singles Chart.

A new edition on clear vinyl was released in October 2023 to commemorate the single's 45th anniversary. This reached number 15 on the UK singles sales chart (not including downloads).

== "Lady" ==
The B-side, written by Ant, demonstrated the band's capacity for fast-paced punk rock. In Australia, DJs on Sydney's Double J radio station preferred to play the B-side, which garnered enough attention for "Lady" rather than the A-Side to appear on the 1980 compilation album In the Bag.

A demo version of "Lady", incorporating "Catch A Falling Star", written by Paul Vance and Lee Pockriss appeared as track 2 on "Antbox" (2000).

== Credits ==
It was produced by the band's singer Adam Ant and session pianist Jo Julian. At this point, the other permanent members of the band were Matthew Ashman (guitar), Dave Barbarossa (drums) and Andy Warren (bass guitar). Saxophonist Greg Mason also appeared on the A-side.

== Damaged Goods ==
Damaged Goods Records released a 12" single of "Young Parisians" & "Lady" in 1989. Both tracks appear on the A-side, while two "Dodgy Interviews" appear on the B-side. The first interview was conducted with Zerox Fanzine in Chelmsford 4 February 1979. The second was done for Pogo Fanzine in Italy after the band's performance in Milan 17 October 1978. The A-side plays at 45 RPM, and the B-side plays at 33 RPM.

== Track listing ==
=== Decca Records ===
Side A

1. "Young Parisians" - 3:02

Side B

1. "Lady" - 2:03

=== Damaged Goods ===
Side A

1. "Young Parisians" - 3:02
2. "Lady" - 2:03

Side B

1. Dodgy Interviews
