= Deutscher Girls =

Single by Adam and the Ants

from the album Jubilee Soundtrack
- B-side: "Plastic Surgery"
- Released: 12 February 1982
- Genre: New wave, post-punk
- Length: 2:40
- Label: E.G. Records
- Songwriter: Adam Ant
- Producer: Guy Ford

Adam and the Ants singles chronology
"Ant Rap" (1981)	"Deutscher Girls" (1982)	"The B-Sides (EP)" (1982)

"Deutscher Girls" is a song by Adam and the Ants. Initially included in the 1978 Derek Jarman film Jubilee, in which Adam Ant appears as "The Kid", the song was not released as a single until 12 February 1982 when it reached number 13 in the UK Singles Chart.

== History ==
"Deutscher Girls" was written by Adam Ant and was an early favourite among fans of the band. The song was first recorded in August 1977 at Free Range Studios with Mark Ryan on guitar; this version appears in the film Jubilee (in the scene depicted on the single sleeve). It was also performed at a John Peel session on 23 January 1978, with new guitarist Johnny Bivouac. The song was re-recorded from scratch the following day for the Jubilee soundtrack album.

"Deutscher Girls" and "Plastic Surgery", also from the Jubilee soundtrack, were the first Adam and the Ants tracks released on vinyl. Both songs were regularly featured in the original Ants' live concerts between May 1977 and January 1980, with "Plastic Surgery" (often used as set opener during 1977–1978) continuing to be performed by the "new" Ants (including Marco Pirroni and two drummers) on tours in 1980. Both songs have been frequently revived for live concerts since 2010.

== Single release ==
Adam and the Ants had achieved massive success with their 1980 album Kings of the Wild Frontier; it was the UK's top selling album of 1981 (having been the 48th-best seller in 1980), and won Best British Album at the 1982 Brit Awards.

With the band's popularity at an all-time high, their former label E.G. Records decided to cash in this success by releasing "Deutscher Girls" as a 7" single. Released on 12 February 1982, it reached number 13 on the UK Singles Chart. Chronologically, it followed "Ant Rap", and included the long-departed Ants line-up of Dave Barbarossa on drums, Johnny Bivouac on guitar and Andy Warren on bass guitar.

It was the second-to-last single by Adam and the Ants. Later in 1982, another of Adam and the Ants' former labels, Do It Records, released "Friends" b/w "Kick"/"Physical" from the Dirk Wears White Sox recording sessions at Sound Development studios in August 1979.

== Lyrics ==
"Deutscher Girls" was inspired by the controversial art film Portiere Di Notte (The Night Porter) by director Liliana Cavani, and starring Dirk Bogarde (after whom Adam and the Ants' 1979 debut album Dirk Wears White Sox is named) and Charlotte Rampling. The 1974 Italian film featured elements of Nazisploitation; Bogarde plays a former Nazi, and Rampling a former concentration camp inmate.

Lyrics were changed from the original Jubilee version when it was released as a single three years later. The line "So, why did you have to be so Nazi" was changed to "So, why did you have to be so nasty", and "Camp 49 way down on the Rhine" was changed to "A lover of mine from down on the Rhine". Adam Ant told Sounds:

It's not about concentration camps. It's about a guy who falls in love with a girl - a member of the Nazi Youth Organisation.
