= Nick Kent =

British music journalist (born 1951)

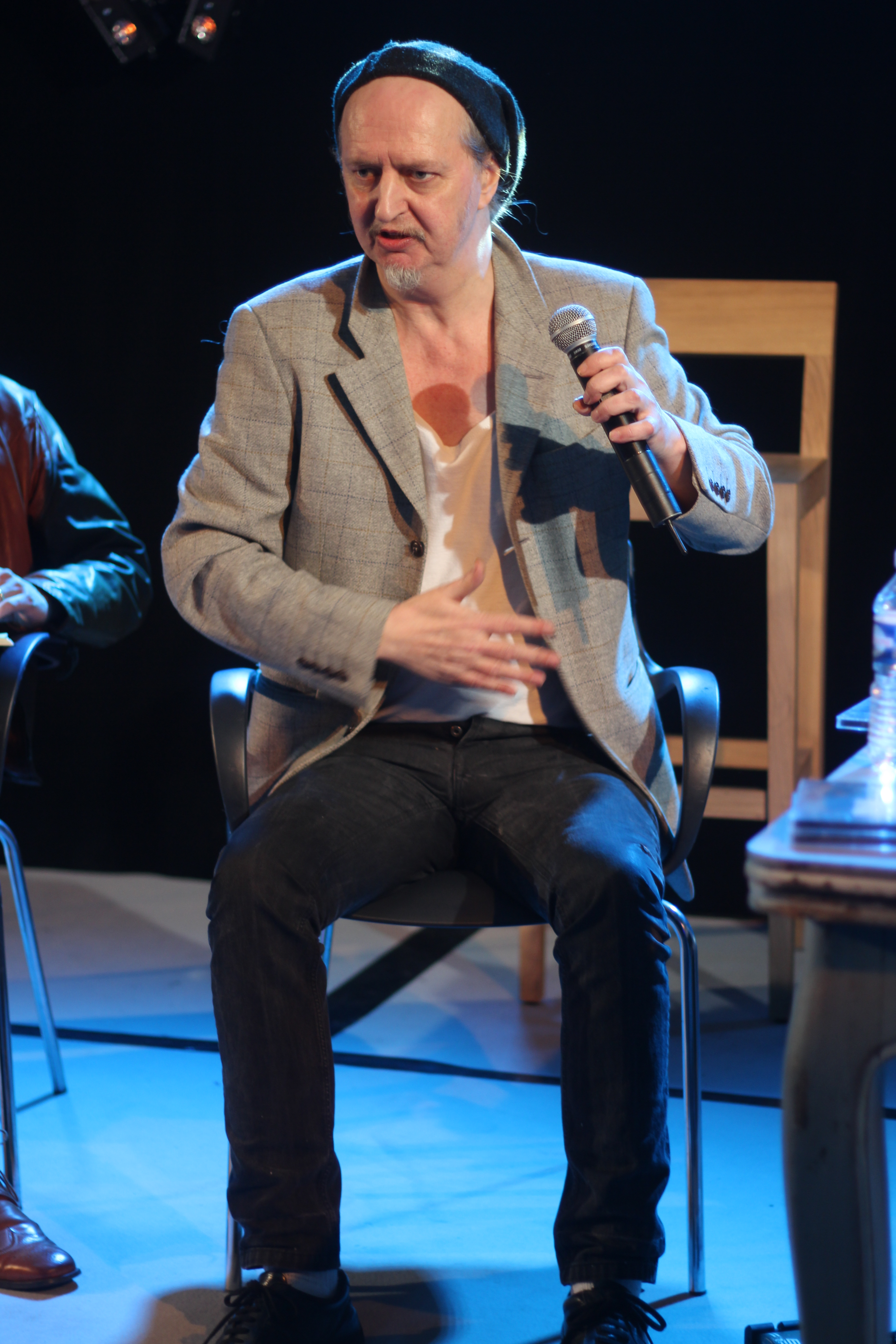
Kent in 2014

Nick Kent (born 24 December 1951) is a British rock critic and musician, best known for his writing for the NME in the 1970s, and his books The Dark Stuff (1994) and Apathy for the Devil (2010).

== Early life ==
Kent, the son of a former Abbey Road Studios sound engineer, began his career as a writer at age 20 in 1972, inspired by Jack Kerouac and Hunter S. Thompson.

Kent's writing talent was evident at college when, after analysing James Joyce's Ulysses, he was recommended to apply for further English study. However, after dropping out of two universities, he started to make a name for himself as a music critic in London's underground music scene.

== Career ==
Along with his contemporaries, such as Paul Morley, Charles Shaar Murray, Paul Rambali and Danny Baker, Kent is widely considered one of the most important and influential UK music journalists of the 1970s. He wrote for the British music publication New Musical Express, moving to The Face later on in his career. Kent's writing predominantly covers the lives and music of rock-and-roll musicians. His prose is laced with images of self-destruction and compassion, exploring the reality of being an artist in the late twentieth century. Kent is the author of two books: The Dark Stuff, a collection of his journalism, and Apathy for the Devil: A 1970s Memoir, which is an autobiographical account of his life and experiences in the 1970s, published in March 2010.

In the mid-70s, Kent played guitar with an early incarnation of the Sex Pistols, and performed briefly with members of the early punk band London SS, under the name Subterraneans. Brian James, later of the Damned, said of him: "Nick is a great guitarist, he plays just like Keith Richards. He's always trying to get a band together but he just can't do it. Nerves, I guess. It's a shame, though, because he loves rock 'n' roll and he's a great bloke."

Kent's relationship with the punk rock scene was strained. Already a well-known music critic and a symbol of the music industry, he was assaulted by Sid Vicious with a motorcycle chain in the 100 Club. Kent relates the incident in Johnny Rogan's book on rock management, Starmakers & Svengalis; in The Filth and the Fury, director Julien Temple's 2000 documentary of the Sex Pistols; in Jon Savage's book England's Dreaming; as well as in his own books, The Dark Stuff and Apathy for the Devil. Despite this infamous incident, Vicious claimed in a 1977 interview that Kent was "good fun" and that "he bought me a meal a little while ago, it was really nice of him". In the film Sid & Nancy, there is a scene where "Dick Bent", described by Pistols follower Brenda Windzor (Kathy Burke) as "a wanky journalist who doesn't appreciate the Pistols", is assaulted by Sid Vicious (Gary Oldman) at one of their gigs.

Kent also had bad relations with the early punk incarnation of Adam and the Ants, starting with his NME review of the soundtrack album to Derek Jarman's film Jubilee in which Kent labelled Adam Ant a Nazi sympathiser on account of the featured song "Deutscher Girls". In retaliation, Ant sarcastically name-checked Kent in the song "Press Darlings" (released as the B-side of the Ants' No. 2 UK hit single "Kings of the Wild Frontier" and on the US edition of the hit album of the same name), claiming that "If passion ends in fashion, then Nick Kent is the best dressed man in town..." In addition, then-Ants guitarist Matthew Ashman assaulted Kent with a potful of strawberry jam in the queue outside Camden's Music Machine venue.

== Personal life ==
In 1974, Kent began dating and moved in with Chrissie Hynde, later lead singer of the band the Pretenders, after she began working at NME. Throughout the 1970s, Kent was a heroin addict.

Kent currently lives in Paris with his wife, and contributes articles occasionally to the British and French press, most notably The Guardian. He is the father of synthwave musician James Kent, best known as Perturbator.

== Books ==
- The Dark Stuff: Selected Writings on Rock Music – foreword by Iggy Pop (1st edition: 1994, Penguin Books; updated 2nd edition: 2002, Da Capo Press)
- Apathy for the Devil: A Seventies Memoir (2010, Da Capo Press)
