= Ant Rap =

Single by Adam and the Ants

from the album Prince Charming
- B-side: "Friends"
- Released: 4 December 1981
- Genre: Rap rock; new wave; post-punk
- Length: 3:26
- Label: CBS
- Songwriters: Adam Ant; Marco Pirroni
- Producer: Chris Hughes

Adam and the Ants singles chronology
"Prince Charming" (1981)	"Ant Rap" (1981)	"Deutscher Girls" (1982)

Music video
- "Ant Rap" on YouTube

"Ant Rap" is a song by the British new wave band Adam and the Ants. Written by Adam Ant and Marco Pirroni, the song was remixed from the version on the group's 1981 album Prince Charming. It entered the UK Singles Chart in December 1981 at number 9 before rising to a peak position of number three.

== Music video ==
The setting for the music video is Bodiam Castle and features Adam wearing a suit of armour in the style of the movie Excalibur (released the same year, and made by the same armourer, Terry English), then a blue American football uniform with the number 57 on the front. While in his American football strip, he crashes through a door, revealing Marco Pirroni sitting at a grand piano dressed as Liberace. Adam then does a Bruce Lee impersonation while rescuing the princess (played by Lulu) before being seen again in his armour. The video ends with Adam jumping from the top of the castle into the moat (the jump is actually performed by a stuntman). He throws his sword in the moat only to see an armoured hand lift it again from the water.

== Reception ==
While widely panned by critics, "Ant Rap" was one of the earliest rap singles to chart in the UK, reaching number 3 on the UK singles chart.

Paul Lester of The Guardian described "Ant Rap" as one of "the weirdest chart [hits] of all time: "Adam Ant is easily dismissed as pop pantomime, but his paeans to insects weren't just lyrically peculiar, they were examples of populist daring at its best, all yelps and Burundi beats - I'd single out his clattering Ant Rap as the weirdest of the weird, with extra points for reaching [number 3] with a song with no verse, no chorus, and a refrain comprising a list of the band members: 'Marco, Merrick, Terry-Lee, Gary Tibbs and yours tru-ly'."

== Lyrics ==
Ant boasts of his success and his ability to dance, and calls out the anarchists of the music scene, affirming he was never concerned with receiving their "credibility".

== "Friends" ==
It was fairly common for Ant to record new versions of his pre-1980 compositions for the B-sides of his singles. For this single, a song from 1978 called "Friends" was used. The song had enjoyed a short spell as part of the band's live set in the summer and autumn of 1978; it was recorded for the July 1978 Peel Session and an August 1978 demo at Decca Studios, and was one of three unused tracks from the Dirk Wears White Sox album sessions Do It Records would eventually release on The B-Sides EP in March 1982.

Among the names Adam Ant claims as friends in an attempt to gain free entry into a club include Shirley Bassey, late Beatle Stuart Sutcliffe, Michael Jackson, Michael Caine, John Wayne, Stevie Wonder, Eric Fromm and Bryan Ferry.
