= Brit Awards 1982 =

British music awards ceremony

- Date: 4 February 1982
- Venue: Grosvenor House Hotel
- Hosted by: David Jacobs
- Most awards: Adam and the Ants, Cliff Richard, The Human League, John Lennon, Martin Rushent, The Police, Randy Crawford, Simon Rattle and Soft Cell (Once)
- Most nominations: Adam and the Ants (4)

Brit Awards 1982 was the second event of the Brit Awards, an annual pop music award ceremony in the United Kingdom. It was organised by the British Phonographic Industry and took place on 4 February 1982 at Grosvenor House Hotel in London. The host was David Jacobs.

== Winners and nominees ==
British Album of the Year	British Producer of the Year
Adam and the Ants – Kings of the Wild Frontier; The Human League – Dare; Queen – Greatest Hits	Martin Rushent; Chris Neill; Stuart Colman
British Single of the Year	Classical Recording
Soft Cell – "Tainted Love"; Adam and the Ants – "Prince Charming"; Adam and the Ants – "Stand and Deliver"	Simon Rattle; James Levine; Vernon Handley
British Male Solo Artist	British Female Solo Artist
Cliff Richard; Elvis Costello; Shakin' Stevens	Randy Crawford; Sheena Easton; Toyah Willcox
British Group	British Breakthrough Act
The Police; Adam and the Ants; Madness	The Human League; Depeche Mode; Linx; Soft Cell; Toyah Willcox
Outstanding Contribution to Music	
John Lennon; Cliff Richard; The Police	

== Multiple nominations and awards ==
The following artists received multiple awards and/or nominations.

Artists who received multiple nominations
Nominations	Artist
4	Adam and the Ants
2	Cliff Richard
2	The Human League
2	The Police
2	Soft Cell
2	Toyah Willcox
