= The B-Sides (EP) =

- Picture disc edition

EP by Adam and the Ants
- Released: 1982
- Recorded: August 1979
- Genre: New wave, post-punk
- Label: Do It
- Producer: Adam Ant

Adam and the Ants chronology
Deutscher Girls (1982)	The B-Sides (1982)	Goody Two Shoes (1982)

"Friends" b/w "Kick"/"Physical", also known as The B-Sides, is an extended play and the final single from Adam and the Ants. All three songs were written by Adam Ant, and were early fan favourites among 'Antpeople'. "Friends" and "Physical" were performed at a John Peel session on 10 July 1978. All three tracks had previously been recorded in 1978 for the Ants' first label Decca Records. "Kick" at RAK Studios in Chalbert Street, London, produced by Snips, "Friends" and "Physical" at Decca's own studio at Broadhurst Gardens, West Hampstead, produced by Ant himself.

== Antmusic EP ==
All three tracks were recorded during the Dirk Wears White Sox recording session at Sound Development Studios in August 1979; none were used on the album. Following the departure of all three sidemen with manager Malcolm McLaren to form Bow Wow Wow in January 1980, Do It Records intended to release the tracks on the Antmusic EP in early 1980 to complete the contract of the seemingly defunct band. However Adam quickly proved the survival of the band with a new line-up. The songs "Cartrouble" (Pt. 2) and "Kick" along with new lyrics added, were re-recorded with new guitarist Marco Pirroni and guest drummer Jon Moss. With the contract thus fulfilled Adam and the Ants and Do It Records parted ways, after releasing the single "Kick".

Soon afterwards Adam and the Ants signed with CBS Records and achieved massive commercial success with the album Kings of the Wild Frontier. Released in late 1980, it was the UK number one selling album in 1981, and the 48th bestseller of 1980. It was named the Best British Album at the 1982 Brit Awards.

As the band's popularity peaked in Britain, Do It decided to cash in on their success by releasing the Antmusic EP, consisting of "Friends" b/w "Kick"/"Physical" as a 7" single in 1982, along with a 12" version also featuring remixes of the original album versions of "Cartrouble" parts 1 and 2. Chronologically the single followed "Deutscher Girls", which was also an old track released by a former label (E.G. Records). It reached number 46 on the UK Singles Chart.

== B-sides ==
Cleaner, more polished versions of three songs had already been released as B-sides to previous Adam and the Ants singles. "Friends" was the B-side of "Ant Rap", "Kick", with completely different lyrics, was the B-side of "Cartrouble", and "Physical" was renamed "Physical (You're So)" when it appeared on the B-side of "Dog Eat Dog".

The version of "Physical" that appears on this single appeared on the B-side of a July 1980 pressing of 2000 copies of the "Zerox" single, though "Whip in My Valise" was still credited.

== "Friends" lyrics ==
In "Friends", Adam does a considerable amount of name dropping, among the people cited as friends include Shirley Bassey, former Beatle Stuart Sutcliffe, Mr. Spock, Michael Caine, John Wayne, Stevie Wonder, Eric Fromm and Bryan Ferry. It is also cited in the lyrics by Ant that: "I'm a friend of a friend but you don't know me."
