= Dog Eat Dog (Adam and the Ants song) =

- On the back cover, the famous "Ant Warrior" logo, drawn by ex-Bazooka Joe guitarist Daniel Kleinman, makes its first appearance.

Single by Adam and the Ants

from the album Kings of the Wild Frontier
- B-side: "Physical (You're So)"
- Released: 3 October 1980
- Recorded: August 1980
- Genre: New pop
- Label: CBS Records
- Songwriters: Adam Ant & Marco Pirroni
- Producer: Chris Hughes

Adam and the Ants singles chronology
"Kings of the Wild Frontier" (1980)	"Dog Eat Dog" (1980)	"Antmusic" (1980)

Music video
- "Dog Eat Dog" on YouTube

"Dog Eat Dog" is the opening track on the Adam and the Ants' second studio album Kings of the Wild Frontier. It was written by Adam Ant & Marco Pirroni, and features the two-drummer Burundi beat for which Adam and the Ants would become famous. Released as a 7" single on 3 October 1980, it was their first top ten hit.

== Top of the Pops ==
Shortly after the single's release, the band performed "Dog Eat Dog" on Top of the Pops on 16 October 1980, helping launch the single to number 4 on the UK Singles Chart, and increasing anticipation for the forthcoming album Kings of the Wild Frontier (released 3 November 1980).

== Royal Variety Performance ==
Whereas the Top of the Pops performance helped launch the band's success, Adam and the Ants' performance of a medley of 'Antmusic' & "Dog Eat Dog" at the Royal Variety Performance on 18 April 1981 lives in notoriety. During 'Antmusic', Kevin Mooney had a very public meltdown that led to his leaving the band. As the band lip synced & mimed through the performance, Mooney took off his bass, placing it on the floor, making it obvious that he wasn't actually playing. This continued & became more pronounced through "Dog Eat Dog".

== Lyrics ==
In his 2007 autobiography, Stand and Deliver, Adam said that "Dog Eat Dog" was inspired by a Margaret Thatcher quote he'd read in a newspaper. The expression refers to a situation of fierce competition in which people are willing to harm each other in order to succeed. The lyrics of this song are about bands in competition with each other, and doing just that.

== "Physical (You're So)" ==
The B-side to the single was "Physical (You're So)." It was a rerecording of an old favourite among "Antpeople" which, up to this point, had been known as "Physical" or "You're So Physical." The song was first recorded by Ant as a four-track home demo in the Chelsea flat of Linda Ashby and was first played live in March 1978. Adam and the Ants performed the song at a John Peel session on 10 July 1978 and recorded a full band demo at Decca Studios circa August 1978. Originally a medium-fast song, the tempo was gradually slowed down until, by late 1978, it was a slow song.

This particular version was recorded during the Kings of the Wild Frontier LP sessions circa August 1980. On this version, Ant can be heard saying, "Eat your heart out Do It," during the track's opening riff in direct reference to Do It Records' unofficial release of an old version of the song which had been recorded during sessions for Dirk Wears White Sox and then discarded from the track listing, on the B-side of the Zerox single repress some months earlier. This version, along with two other Dirk out-takes, was reissued in March 1982 as The Antmusic EP.

"Physical (You're So)" was not included on the UK edition of Kings of the Wild Frontier. However, when the album was released in the US, the track "Making History" was dropped in favour of "Physical (You're So)" & "Press Darlings" (the B-side of "Kings of the Wild Frontier") for the American release.

"Physical" was covered by Nine Inch Nails, and appears as one of the two bonus songs on Broken.
