= Stand and Deliver (Adam and the Ants song) =

1981 single by Adam and the Ants

Single by Adam and the Ants

from the album Prince Charming
- B-side: "Beat My Guest"
- Released: 1 May 1981
- Genre: New wave; glam punk
- Length: 3:34
- Label: CBS
- Songwriters: Adam Ant; Marco Pirroni
- Producer: Chris Hughes

Adam and the Ants singles chronology
"Antmusic" (1980)	"Stand and Deliver" (1981)	"Prince Charming" (1981)

Music video
- "Stand and Deliver" on YouTube

"Stand and Deliver" is a song by the English new wave band Adam and the Ants, released as the lead single from their third studio album, Prince Charming (1981). It was the band's first No. 1 hit in the UK. The phrase "stand and deliver — your money or your life", used in the lyrics, is commonly associated with highwaymen in 18th century England.

In 2015, the song was voted by the British public as the nation's 15th favourite 1980s number one in a poll for ITV.

== Release ==
Adam and the Ants' previous single, "Antmusic", debuted on the UK Singles Chart on 6 December 1980. It spent nine weeks in the top 10, peaking at No. 2, but was denied the No. 1 position by the re-release of John Lennon's "Imagine" after his murder in New York City on 8 December 1980.

"Stand and Deliver" became the band's first No. 1 when it debuted at the top spot on 3 May 1981, and remained there for five weeks. Listed as the third best-selling single of 1981, it has sold 1.03 million copies in the UK, and was in 2023 included on the Official Charts Company's list of the UK's best-selling singles of all time at No. 141. On the US Dance chart, "Stand and Deliver" peaked at No. 38.

Copies of the single "Stand and Deliver" b/w "Beat My Guest" were included as a free bonus item with some vinyl copies of the US version of the album Kings of the Wild Frontier on Epic Records. Epic's cassette edition appended the two tracks to the ends of either side of the tape. A slightly different version of "Stand and Deliver" was then featured on their follow-up LP, Prince Charming, released in November 1981.

== Music video ==
The costume and general plot of the video show a strong influence from the 1973 Monty Python sketch "Dennis Moore", although the highwayman scenario had also recently formed the basis for the Dick Turpin series on UK television, starring Richard O'Sullivan in the title role. It features Adam Ant dressed as a "dandy highwayman" who threatens his victims with the mirror image of their unfashionable selves and who is captured and escapes being hanged from the gallows with help from his accomplices (his band members).

The video's opening sequence of Adam Ant putting on his make-up before going out on a robbery became a defining visual image for Adam Ant in the years that followed; a still from this was used as the sleeve for the band's next single. The video also features the second appearance of Amanda Donohoe, who had also appeared in the previous video for "Antmusic". At the time, she was Adam Ant's girlfriend. Limahl also appears in the video as an extra.

== Charts ==
=== Weekly charts ===
Chart (1981)	Peak position
Australia (Kent Music Report)	12
Belgium (Ultratop 50 Flanders)	7
Finland (Suomen virallinen lista)	22
Ireland (IRMA)	2
Netherlands (Dutch Top 40)	8
Netherlands (Single Top 100)	4
New Zealand (Recorded Music NZ)	32
UK Singles (OCC)	1
US Dance Club Songs (Billboard)	38
West Germany (Official German Charts)	8

=== Year-end charts ===
Chart (1981)	Position
Australia (Kent Music Report)	47
Netherlands (Dutch Top 40)	55
Netherlands (Single Top 100)	38

== "Beat My Guest" ==
It was fairly common for Ant to record new versions of his pre-1980 compositions for the B-side of his singles. For this single, an old Ant song dating back at least to May 1977 was used. "Beat My Guest" was the first song Adam and the Ants played at their official debut gig at the Institute of Contemporary Arts restaurant on 10 May 1977. A full band recording was made in the same 14 July 1977 Chappell Studios recording session that had produced the version of Plastic Surgery featured in Derek Jarman's film Jubilee. The version on the B-side of this single was recorded in August 1980 during sessions for the Kings of the Wild Frontier album and featured the band's previous bass player Kevin Mooney.

== Covers ==
"Stand and Deliver" has been covered by Poppy and by indie bands (Society Burning, Lynyrd's Innards, among others). Sugar Ray provided the first notable cover on their 1997 release, Floored.

=== No Doubt version ===
"Stand and Deliver"

Promotional single by No Doubt

from the album Push and Shove
- Released: 2009
- Recorded: 2009
- Studio: Paramount Recording Studios (Los Angeles, CA); Chalice Recording Studios (Los Angeles, CA)
- Genre: Glam punk; punk rock; new wave
- Length: 3:22
- Label: Interscope
- Songwriter: Adam Ant; Marco Pirroni
- Producer: No Doubt

Audio video
- "Stand and Deliver" on YouTube

In 2009, American rock band No Doubt recorded a cover version of "Stand and Deliver". They performed the song while playing a fictional 1980s band, Snowed Out, in the Gossip Girl episode "Valley Girls", airing 11 May 2009, and also performed the song on their 2009 tour during the encore. It was eventually included on the deluxe edition bonus disc of the band's sixth studio album, Push and Shove, released on 21 September 2012.

== "Save the Gorilla" ==
In 2003, Adam Ant embarked upon an ill-fated attempt to raise awareness of the plight of the endangered mountain gorilla in Central Africa by reworking "Stand and Deliver" into "Save the Gorilla". This was to have been the lead track of a five track EP (with the remaining four tracks all being covers chosen for a jungle/primate theme) of which 2000 copies were pressed. Co-writer Marco Pirroni and the original song publishers EMI Publishing blocked its release just days before its intended release on 17 November, and the EP was withdrawn. One EP track, a cover of "Jungle Rock", eventually surfaced on collaborator Boz Boorer's 2008 solo album Miss Pearl.
