= Johnny Bivouac =

English musician, actor and record producer

John Beckett (born 1958) is an English musician, actor and record producer. He is best known for being an early guitarist for British punk rock group Adam and the Ants under the name Johnny Bivouac, during which time he recorded the track "Deutscher Girls" with the band, later a UK Top 15 hit single. As an actor, he is best known for the role of Strings in the police sitcom Operation Good Guys.

== Adam and the Ants and other bands ==
In June 1977, Beckett was guitarist in the band Desolation Angels when their drummer, David Barbarossa was recruited away from the group by a recently formed punk band, The Ants, who had supported them at a concert in Chelsea that month. Four months later, after the Ants sacked their guitarist Mark Ryan, Beckett was recruited as his replacement and took the stagename Johnny Bivouac. Bivouac stayed with the band, shortly thereafter renamed Adam and the Ants, until May 1978, recording the band's first Peel session on 23 January 1978 and the following day recording the track Deutscher Girls for the soundtrack album of Derek Jarman's film Jubilee.E.G. Records label released the track as a single in February 1982 ( the "B" side was Plastic Surgery ) , to cash in on the later commercial success of the Ants' early 1980s incarnation. This reached 13 on the UK Singles Chart.

After leaving the band, Bivouac was a member of Ryan's band Lustralarza and later Swim. In 1980 he was invited to join the new Ants as bass player, but declined, with the role eventually going to Kevin Mooney. He has continued to use the pseudonym Johnny Bivouac for any guitar credits since leaving the Ants.

== Production work ==
Later on, Bivouac set up his own studio facility to help develop his production and composition, while continuing to work live with various bands as a guitarist and, occasionally, keyboard player. He worked as a composer and producer on various corporate videos and advertising jingles before composing his first work for mainstream television Carlton's The Spooks of Bottle Bay. He has since worked on numerous film and TV projects as either composer, music producer, music supervisor and/or performer.

Beckett has produced and remixed artists as diverse as Freddie Mercury, Denise van Outen and Rolf Harris. He also dabbled in hard-core techno with the project Vagen, following his scoring of a three-part series about the history of the Volkswagen Beetle.

== Fugitive Group ==
In the 1990s, Beckett became a partner in British independent film/TV company Fugitive Features (responsible for such films as The Krays, Death Machine and The Passion of Darkly Noon), initially running their music publishing division, Fugitive Music Ltd. Soon he was involved in all areas of the company's activities including production, administration and music supervision. As of November 2010 he was a director of the Group.

== Acting ==
Beckett appeared as Strings in the BBC comedy series Operation Good Guys, where he portrayed a musically frustrated policeman. This led to further roles in the films Final Cut and Love, Honour and Obey.

Preceded by Mark Ryan	Adam and the Ants lead guitarist 1977-1978	Succeeded by Matthew Ashman
