= Cartrouble =

Single by Adam and the Ants

from the album Dirk Wears White Sox
- B-side: "Kick!"
- Released: 7 March 1980
- Recorded: February 1980
- Genre: Post-punk
- Length: 3:27
- Label: Do It
- Songwriter: Adam Ant
- Producer: Chris Hughes

Adam and the Ants singles chronology
"Zerox" (1979)	"Cartrouble" (1980)	"Kings of the Wild Frontier" (1980)

"Cartrouble" is a song by Adam and the Ants, released as a single in March 1980 on Do It Records. It peaked at number 33 on the UK Singles Chart. and number 1 on the UK Indie Chart. Though usually stylised as one word, the title has also appeared as two separate words (for example, on the compilation album Antics in the Forbidden Zone).

== "Cartrouble (Parts 1 & 2)" ==
"Cartrouble (Parts 1 & 2)" appeared on Adam and the Ants' debut album Dirk Wears White Sox, also on Do It Records. It features Matthew Ashman on guitar, Dave Barbarossa on drums and Andy Warren on bass guitar. A remix of this version appeared on the 12-inch edition of The Antmusic EP in early 1982. This replaced the original on the 1995 CD release of Dirk Wears White Sox (early pressings of which erroneously featured the single version described below). The 2004 reissue of the same album includes all three versions, with the original returning as track 1.

Music videos of "Cartrouble Part 2" and another album track, "Tabletalk" were filmed in November 1979 as audition footage for Malcolm McLaren. These were directed by Stephanie Gluck and Clive Richardson and filmed in Richardson's back garden.

== "Cartrouble" single ==
"Cartrouble" was re-recorded with a different line-up of Ants in order to fulfil a contractual obligation. Adam's line-up of Ants on the single include his new songwriting partner Marco Pirroni on guitar, bass guitar and backing vocals, and Terry 1 & 2 on drums. Terry 1 & 2 is a pseudonym for Jon Moss who went on to superstardom years later as a member of Culture Club. The song also marks the first time Adam and Pirroni worked together. Another future Ant, Chris Hughes, produced the single - he shortly afterwards joined the band as one of two drummers, using his middle name of Merrick.

"Cartrouble" differs from "Cartrouble (Parts 1 & 2)" "Cartrouble" is essentially a re-arranged and re-recorded version of the “…(Part 2)" alone. It has a heavier but commercially polished sound, making it far more radio-friendly than the original.

== "Kick!" ==
This alternative line-up of Adam and the Ants are also featured on the B-side "Kick!", with a double-track recording of Moss resulting in one of the first two-drummer Burundi beat recordings for which the group became famous. The lyrics are completely different from the version of "Kick" that appears on the Antmusic EP Do It releases in 1982.

== American version of Dirk Wears White Sox ==
The single version was used in place of "Cartrouble (Parts 1 & 2)" on the CBS Epic Records version of Dirk Wears White Sox that was released in America in 1983. "Kick!" was also added, while "Day I Met God" and "Catholic Day" were dropped.
