= Antmusic =

1980 single by Adam and the Ants

Single by Adam and the Ants

from the album Kings of the Wild Frontier
- B-side: "Fall In"
- Released: 28 November 1980
- Genre: New wave; pop
- Length: 3:37
- Label: Epic (UK); CBS (Australia)
- Songwriters: Adam Ant; Marco Pirroni
- Producer: Chris Hughes

Adam and the Ants singles chronology
"Dog Eat Dog" (1980)	"Antmusic" (1980)	"Stand and Deliver" (1981)

Music video
- 'Antmusic' on YouTube

"Antmusic" (often stylised as 'Antmusic') is a song written by Adam Ant & Marco Pirroni, and performed by Adam and the Ants on their second studio album, Kings of the Wild Frontier (1980). The name of the song is also a broad term Adam Ant uses to describe his music, both with Adam and the Ants and solo.

The first use for the term 'Antmusic' was the "Antmusic for sex people" logo, which first appeared on the cover of the Adam and the Ants' single, "Dog Eat Dog". The line "Antmusic for sex people, Sex music for Antpeople" is sung in the track "Don't be Square (Be There)", which also appears on Kings of the Wild Frontier. Antmusic is also the name of a 1994 compilation album.

== Single ==
On 28 November 1980, 'Antmusic' was released as the third single in the UK from Kings of the Wild Frontier. It peaked at No. 2 in the UK in January 1981, being held off the top by the re-release of John Lennon's "Imagine" after his murder in New York City on 8 December 1980. In Australia, the single spent five weeks at No. 1 on the Kent Music Report and earned the band platinum certification for sales of over 100,000 copies. It also reached No. 2 in South Africa, No. 4 in Ireland, and No. 6 in New Zealand. The song was the only commercial single released from the album in North America, and it reached No. 14 on the US Rock Albums & Top Tracks chart, as well as number 19 on the National Disco Action Top 30 chart (alongside "Dog Eat Dog" and "Kings of the Wild Frontier").

== Music video ==
'Antmusic' was the first music video directed by Steve Barron. It features the group invading a discothèque with a giant juke box that different members of the band are shown unplugging to go along with the line, "Unplug the jukebox and do us all a favor." The patrons of the disco stand transfixed, as the band persuades the young audience to turn away from disco music and dance to the new-styled Antmusic. Eventually, they win over their audience, who one by one begin dancing to the song.

Amanda Donohoe, who was Adam Ant's girlfriend at the time, makes her acting debut in the music video.

== Royal Variety Performance ==
On 18 April 1981, Adam and the Ants performed a medley of 'Antmusic' & "Dog Eat Dog" at the Royal Variety Performance. It was during 'Antmusic' that Kevin Mooney had a very public meltdown that led to his leaving the band. As the band lip synced & mimed through the performance, Mooney took off his bass, placing it on the floor, making it obvious that he wasn't actually playing.

== "Fall In" ==
It was common for Ant to record new versions of his pre-1980 compositions for the B-side of his singles. For this single, a song dating back to the pre-Ants band the B-Sides in 1976 called "Fall In" was used. The song was co-written by Ant and Lester Square and originally titled "Fall Out" until the Police released a song by that same name in May 1977. A recording has surfaced of the song being performed by the Ants at a private preview show in a Muswell Hill bedroom on 5 May 1977. Following Square's departure, Ant added new lyrics referencing the band's regular rehearsal space at the Screen on the Green cinema in Islington. The resulting version was first recorded as a home demo in Putney in July 1977, and a full band demo was recorded at Decca Studios in August 1978.

The version on the B-side of 'Antmusic' was recorded in 1980 during sessions for Kings of the Wild Frontier at Rockfield Studios. The song has been a frequent feature of Ant's live setlists both with the Ants and solo from 1977 to the present day. Live versions have been released on the 1994 live album Antmusic: The Very Best of Adam Ant: Disc Two and in excerpt form on the 2014 documentary The Blueblack Hussar directed by Jack Bond. The 1978 Decca Studios version appears in full as closing credit music on the 2015 DVD live video album Dirk Live at the Apollo.

Square's later band the Monochrome Set also continued to perform a version of the song, with new lyrics, under the title "Fallout". The song appeared as a B-side to the 1979 single "He's Frank (Slight Return)" as well as a 1979 Peel Session. Another joint Ant/Square composition titled "Fat Fun", which had similar shared ownership between the two bands (albeit again with differing lyrics), was recorded by the Ants at Rockfield Studios but not released until 2000 on the Antbox box set.

== Charts and certifications ==
=== Weekly charts ===
Chart (1981)	Peak position
Australia (Kent Music Report)	1
Belgium (Ultratop 50 Flanders)	30
Ireland (IRMA)	4
Netherlands (Single Top 100)	41
New Zealand (Recorded Music NZ)	6
South Africa (Springbok Radio)	2
Sweden (Sverigetopplistan)	11
UK Singles (Official Charts)	2
US Dance Club Songs (Billboard) "Dog Eat Dog"/"Antmusic"/"Kings of the Wild Frontier"	19
US Mainstream Rock (Billboard)	14

=== Year-end charts ===
Chart (1981)	Position
Australia (Kent Music Report)	3
New Zealand (Recorded Music NZ)	27
South Africa (Springbok Radio)	20
UK Singles (Official Charts Company)	30

=== Certifications ===
Region	Certification	Certified units/sales
Australia (ARIA)	Platinum	70,000^{^}
United Kingdom (BPI)	Gold	500,000^{^}
^{^} Shipments figures based on certification alone.

== Covers and interpolations ==
- Robbie Williams recorded a cover version and released it as a double A-side with "No Regrets" in November 1998, which was used in A Bug's Life.
- Hypnolovewheel recorded a cover of the song that was included on the compilation album Freedom of Choice: Yesterday's New Wave Hits as Performed by Today's Stars.
- Australian band Rogue Traders sang the 'Antmusic' line "so unplug the jukebox and do us all a favour" in their 2010 song Would You Raise Your Hands?.
