= Prince Charming (song) =

Single by Adam and the Ants

from the album Prince Charming
- B-side: "Christian D'or"
- Released: 4 September 1981
- Genre: New wave
- Length: 3:17
- Label: CBS
- Songwriters: Adam Ant and Marco Pirroni
- Producer: Chris Hughes

Adam and the Ants singles chronology
"Stand and Deliver" (1981)	"Prince Charming" (1981)	"Ant Rap" (1981)

Music video
- "Prince Charming" on YouTube

"Prince Charming" is a 1981 song by the British rock/pop group Adam and the Ants. Written by Adam Ant and Marco Pirroni, and featuring on the album of the same name, it was the band's second number-one single in a row and was the fifth biggest hit of 1981.

== Music video ==
Band member and producer Merrick (Chris Hughes), normally on drums, played a stirring riff on an open-tuned acoustic guitar throughout the song. Lead guitarist Pirroni mimed to this part on both an orchestral harp and a miniature harp in the promotional video. The music video was notable for its extravagant production compared to the videos being produced at the time.

It featured Adam Ant in a male Cinderella role, complete with moustached drag queen evil step-sisters. The sisters accept an invitation to "Come to the ball, and dance the Prince Charming", leaving Ant home doing the chores.

Sitting at a table in an old-style kitchen, Ant is surrounded by his band members, who are encouraging him: "Don't you ever/Don't you ever/Stop being dandy, showing me you're handsome." His Fairy Godmother, portrayed by Diana Dors, suddenly appears with five shirtless men dancing the "Prince Charming". With a wave of her magic wand, she transforms Ant's attire into flamboyant Regency clothes.

Ant makes a grand entrance onto the balcony at the ball and swings down on a chandelier. He, the Ants, his Fairy Godmother, her male attendants and the invited guests of the ball dance the "Prince Charming", which became a much imitated arm-crossing dance as the song rose up the charts. Choreographer Stephanie Coleman explained that each hand movement in the Prince Charming dance had a meaning (in order: Pride, Courage, Humour, Flair), each representing an element of Ant's personality. The video ends with Ant smashing a mirror then singing the "Prince Charming, Prince Charming/Ridicule is nothing to be scared of" refrain as different characters: the Man with No Name (Clint Eastwood from the Dollars Trilogy), Alice Cooper, Sheik Ahmed Ben Hassan (Rudolph Valentino from the silent film The Sheik), and Marlon Brando as Vito Corleone from The Godfather (replaced in an alternative edit of the video by Ant's own "Dandy highwayman" from the "Stand and Deliver" video). The music video was one of Diana Dors' last on-screen performances.

== Lyrics ==
According to Ant, Prince Charming is based on Beau Brummell. Pirroni described the song as "A cleverer song than any of you realise." Ant also said that the dance routine was initially developed when he realised that the beat of the song made it difficult to dance to in a conventional way, meaning it was unlikely to be played in discos and clubs.

== Charts ==
=== Weekly charts ===
Chart (1981)	Peak position
Australia (Kent Music Report)	4
Belgium (Ultratop 50 Flanders)	8
Finland (Suomen virallinen lista)	20
Ireland (IRMA)	1
Netherlands (Dutch Top 40)	17
Netherlands (Single Top 100)	8
UK Singles (OCC)	1
West Germany (Official German Charts)	10

=== Year-end charts ===
Year-end chart performance for
Chart (1981)	Position
Australia (Kent Music Report)	53

== "War Canoe" ==
On 27 March 2010, Rolf Harris claimed on BBC Radio 5 Live's Danny Baker Show that an out-of-court settlement had been reached, with a large sum of royalties received, after a musicologist found "Prince Charming" to be musically identical to Harris's 1965 song "War Canoe". Adam Ant responded to claims of plagiarism by citing that the tune was of Aboriginal Australian origin, saying, "'War Canoe' is a traditional song but I'd never heard Rolf's version. I've got a large collection of ethnic music. We spoke to Rolf about it and we came to an amicable arrangement and I think we were both satisfied with the fact that we derived the idea from an original source."

Harris' version of "War Canoe" was reissued about a month after "Prince Charming" on 9 October 1981 on the EMI record label, but failed to chart.
