= Brit Award for British Group =

British music award

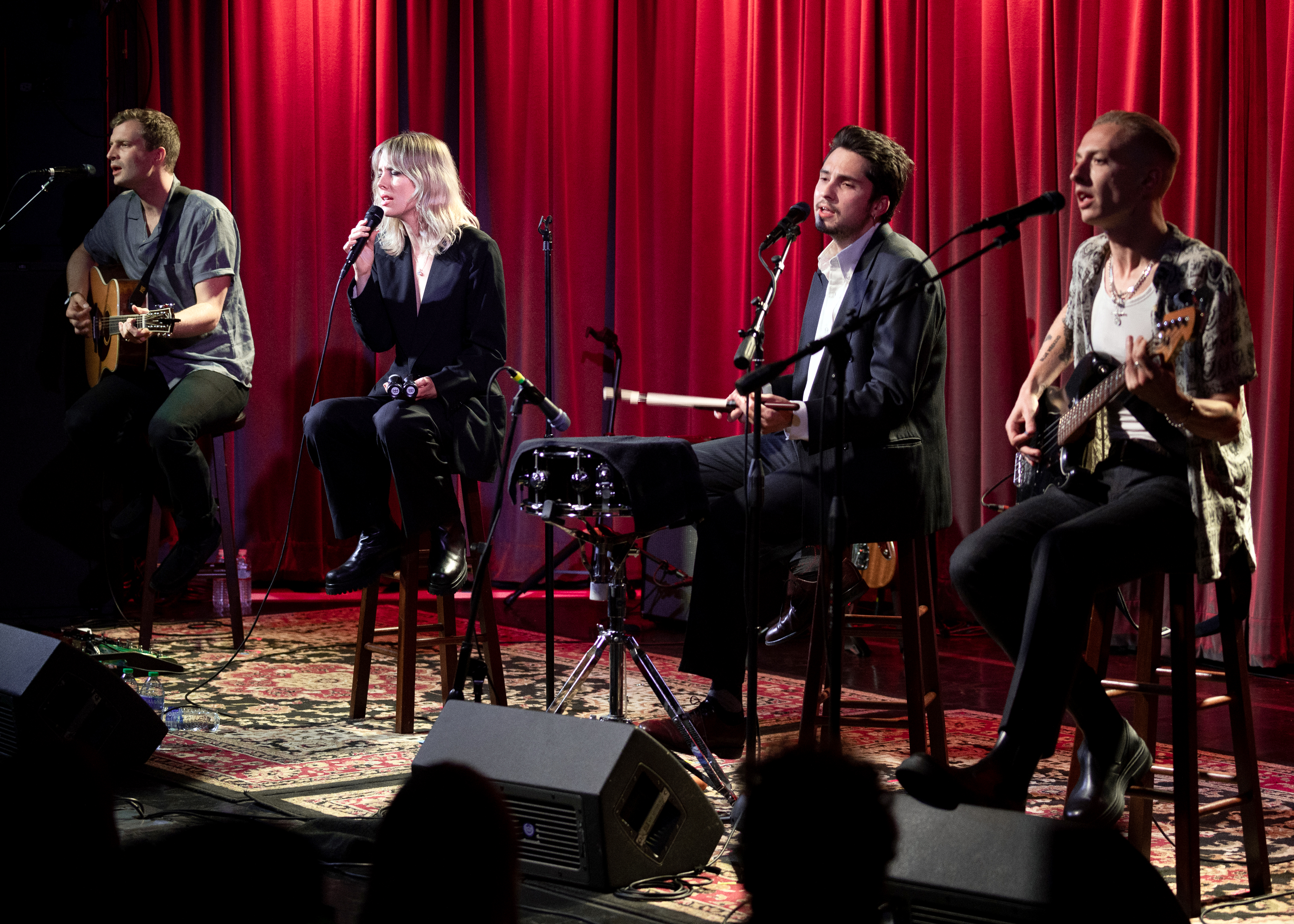
- 2026 winner Wolf Alice
- Awarded for: Achievement in Excellent British Group
- Country: United Kingdom (UK)
- Presented by: British Phonographic Industry (BPI)
- First award: 1977
- Currently held by: Wolf Alice (2026)

Highlights
- Most awards: Coldplay (4)
- Most nominations: Coldplay (10)
- Website: www.brits.co.uk

The Brit Award for British Group is an award given by the British Phonographic Industry (BPI), an organisation which represents record companies and artists in the United Kingdom. The accolade is presented at the Brit Awards, an annual celebration of British and international music. The winners and nominees are determined by the Brit Awards voting academy with over 1,000 members, which comprise record labels, publishers, managers, agents, media, and previous winners and nominees.

The inaugural recipients of the award are the Beatles, who won in 1977. Coldplay hold the record for most wins and nominations in the category, taking the prize four times out of 10. Radiohead hold the record for most nominations without a win, with seven. In 2021, Little Mix became the first female group to win the award. The current holder of the award is Wolf Alice, who won in 2026.

== History ==
The award was first presented in 1977 and was first won by the Beatles. When the second Brit awards were held, the Police received the honour and the award had been given out to one group annually since 1982. The only exception to this was in 1992, when the KLF and Simply Red were revealed to have tied and, as such, both groups were announced as winners. Damon Albarn is the only individual to have been nominated for work in multiple groups, receiving five nominations (including one win) as a member of Blur, and five nominations (including one win) as a member of Gorillaz. In 2021, Little Mix made history when they became the first female group to win the award since it was first presented in 1977. The group took to call out the award ceremony and the music industry over white male dominance, the lack of nominations and wins for female groups in the category and paid homage to previous girl group nominees.

== Winners and nominees ==
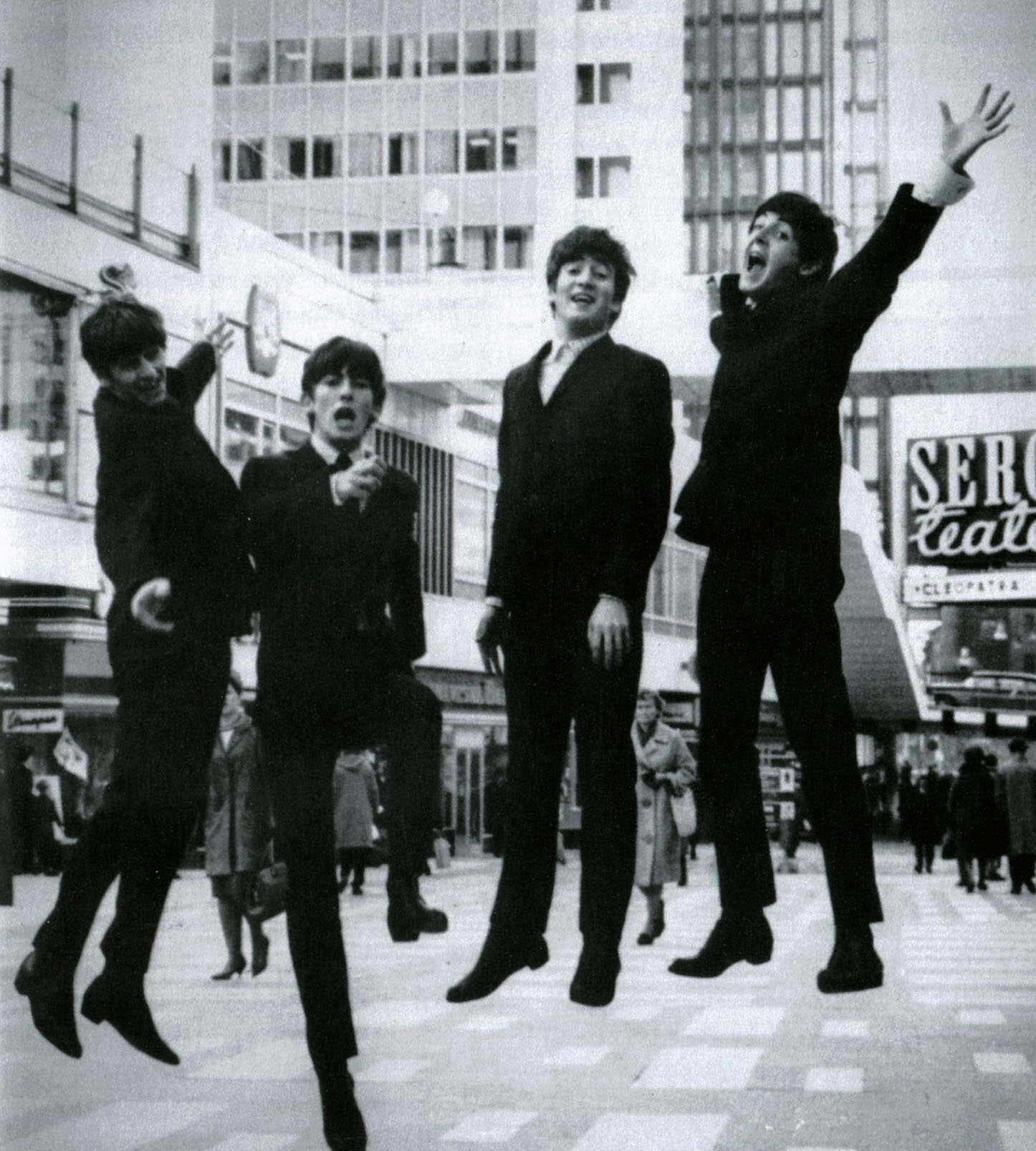
Inaugural recipients The Beatles

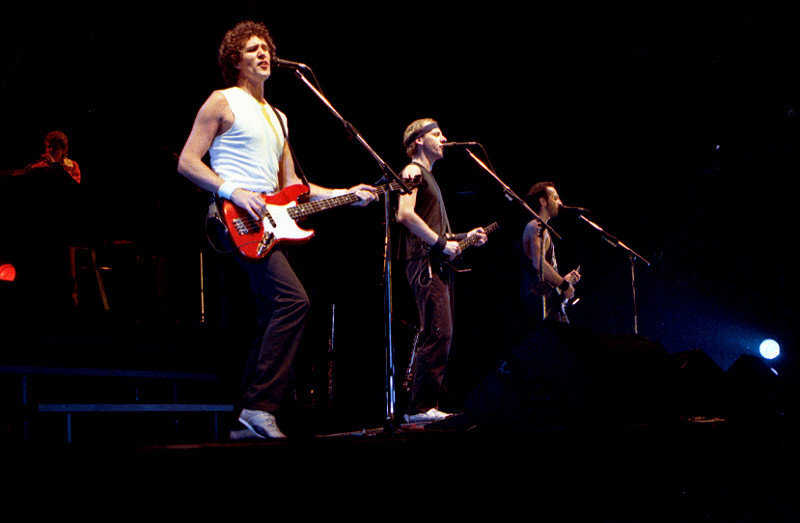
Two-time winners Dire Straits

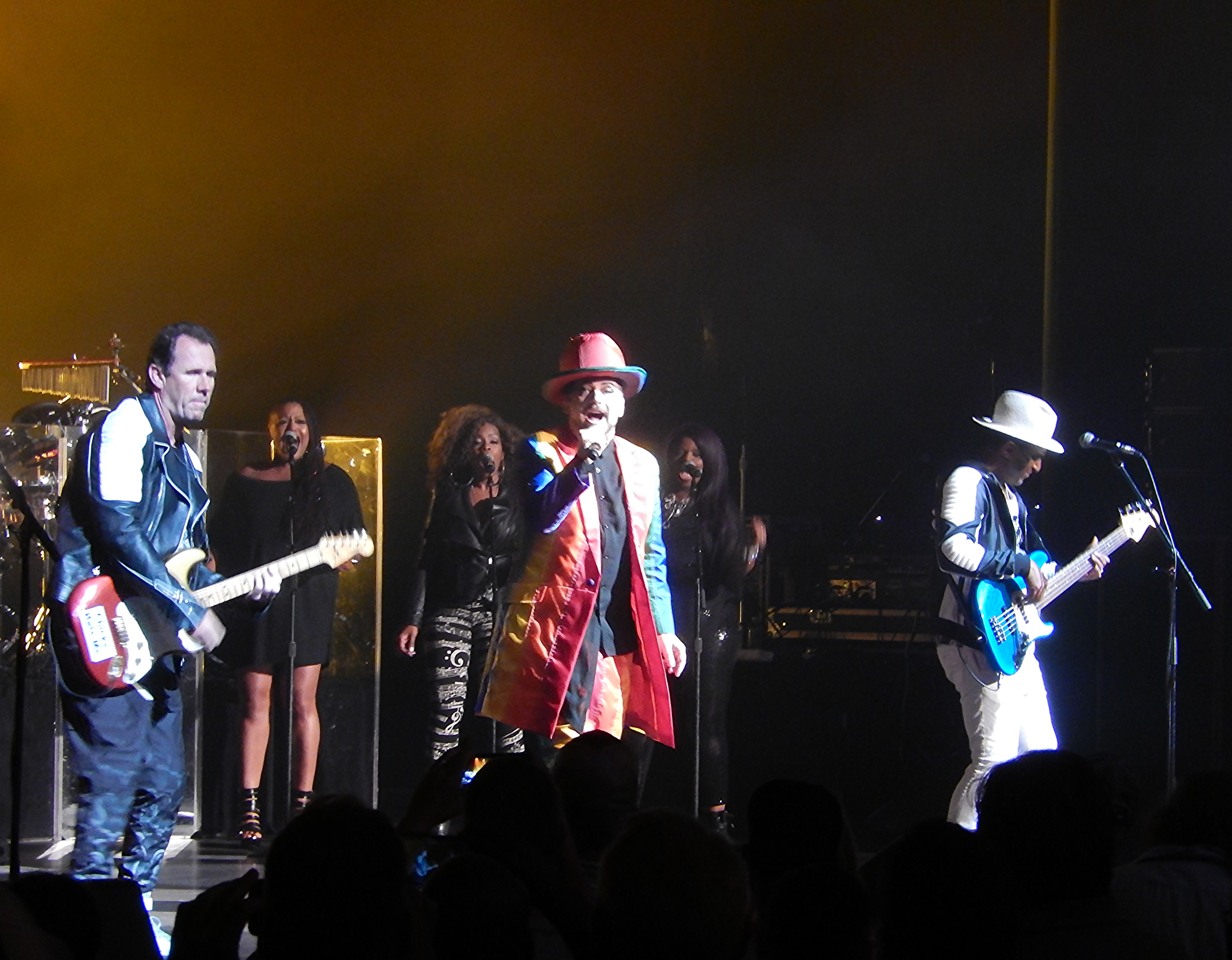
Culture Club won in 1984

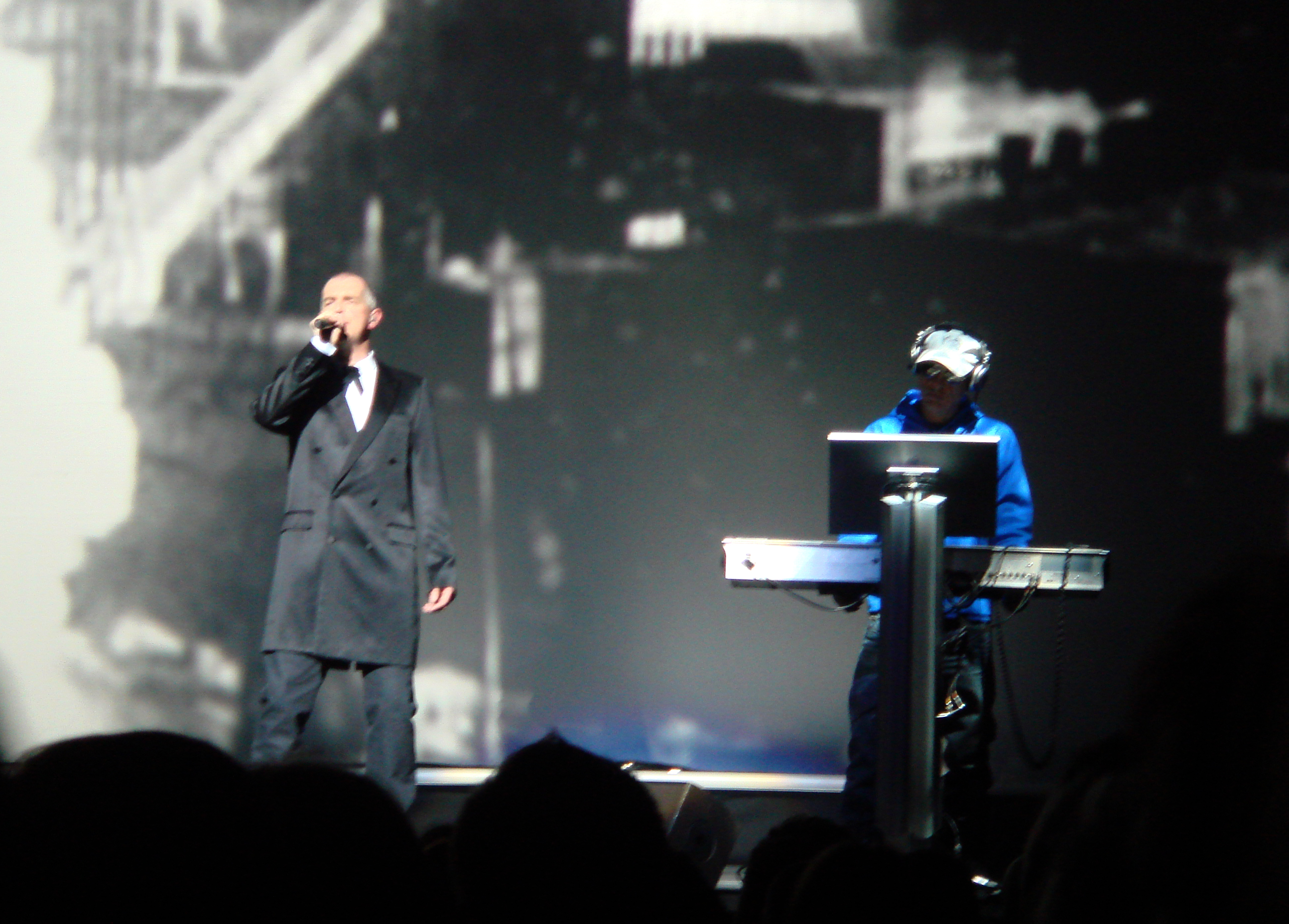
1988 recipients Pet Shop Boys

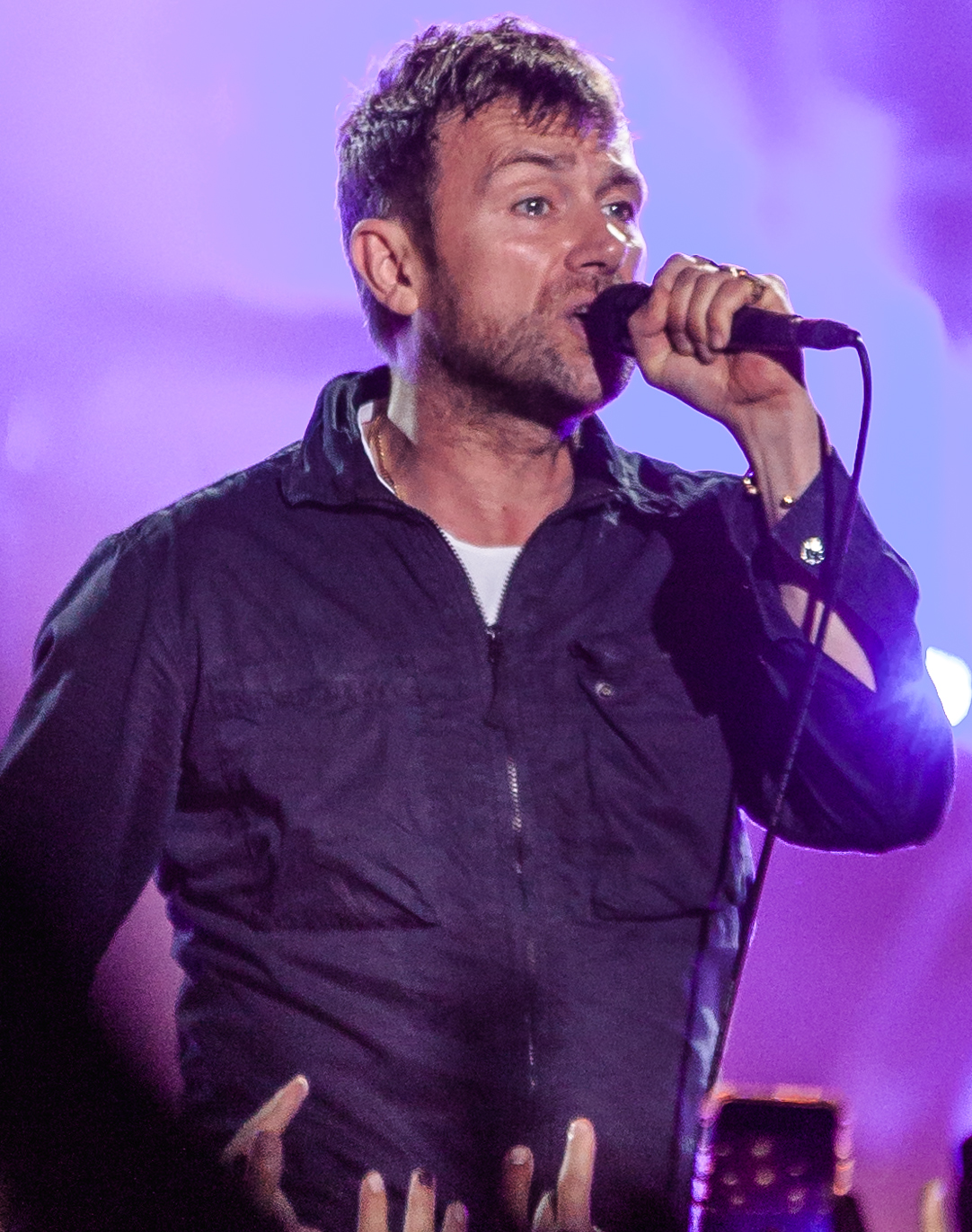
Damon Albarn is notable for having won the award as a member of two different groups, winning with Blur in 1995 and Gorillaz in 2018

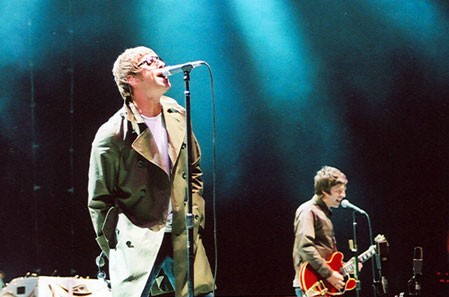
Oasis won the award in 1996

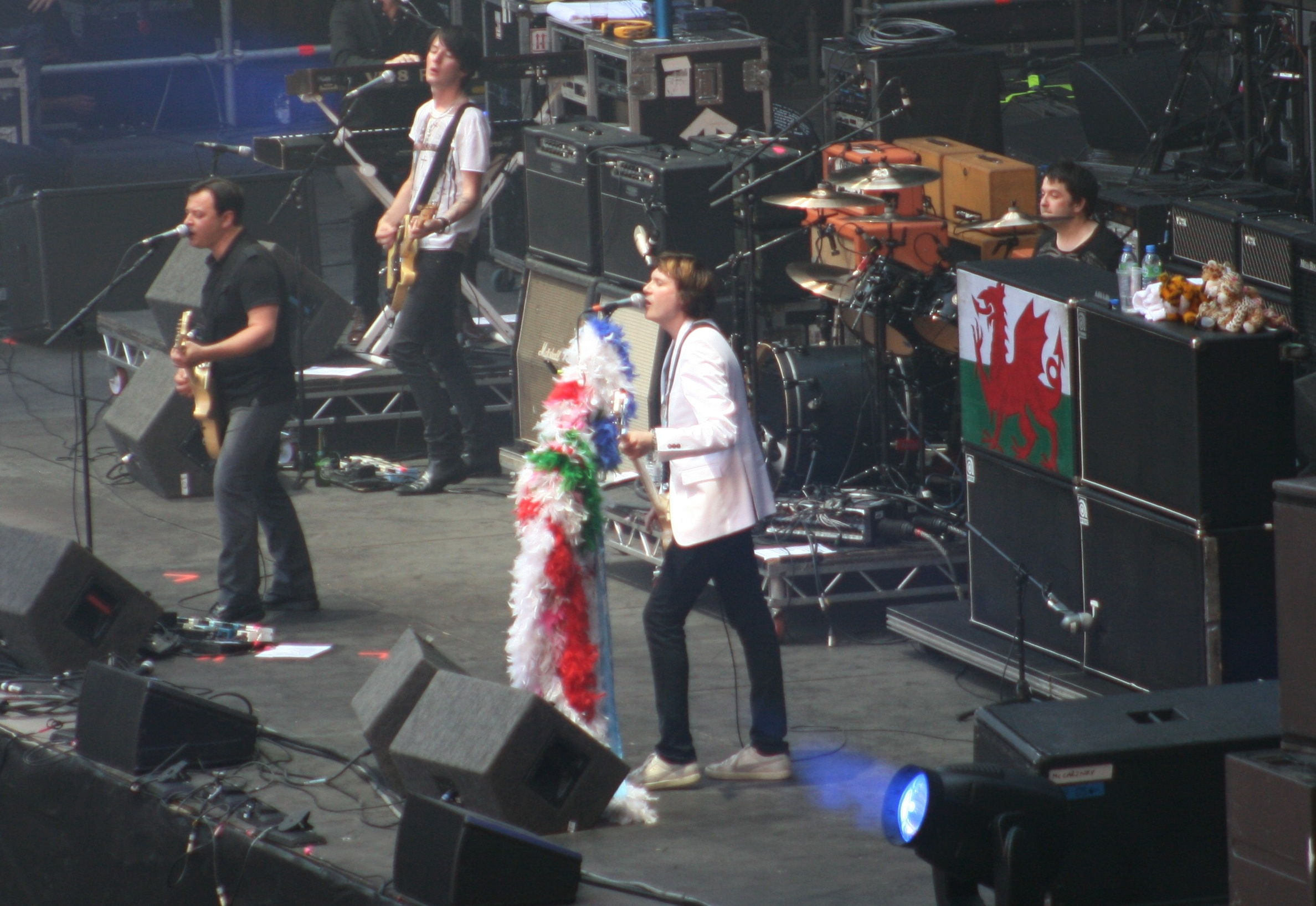
Two-time winners Manic Street Preachers

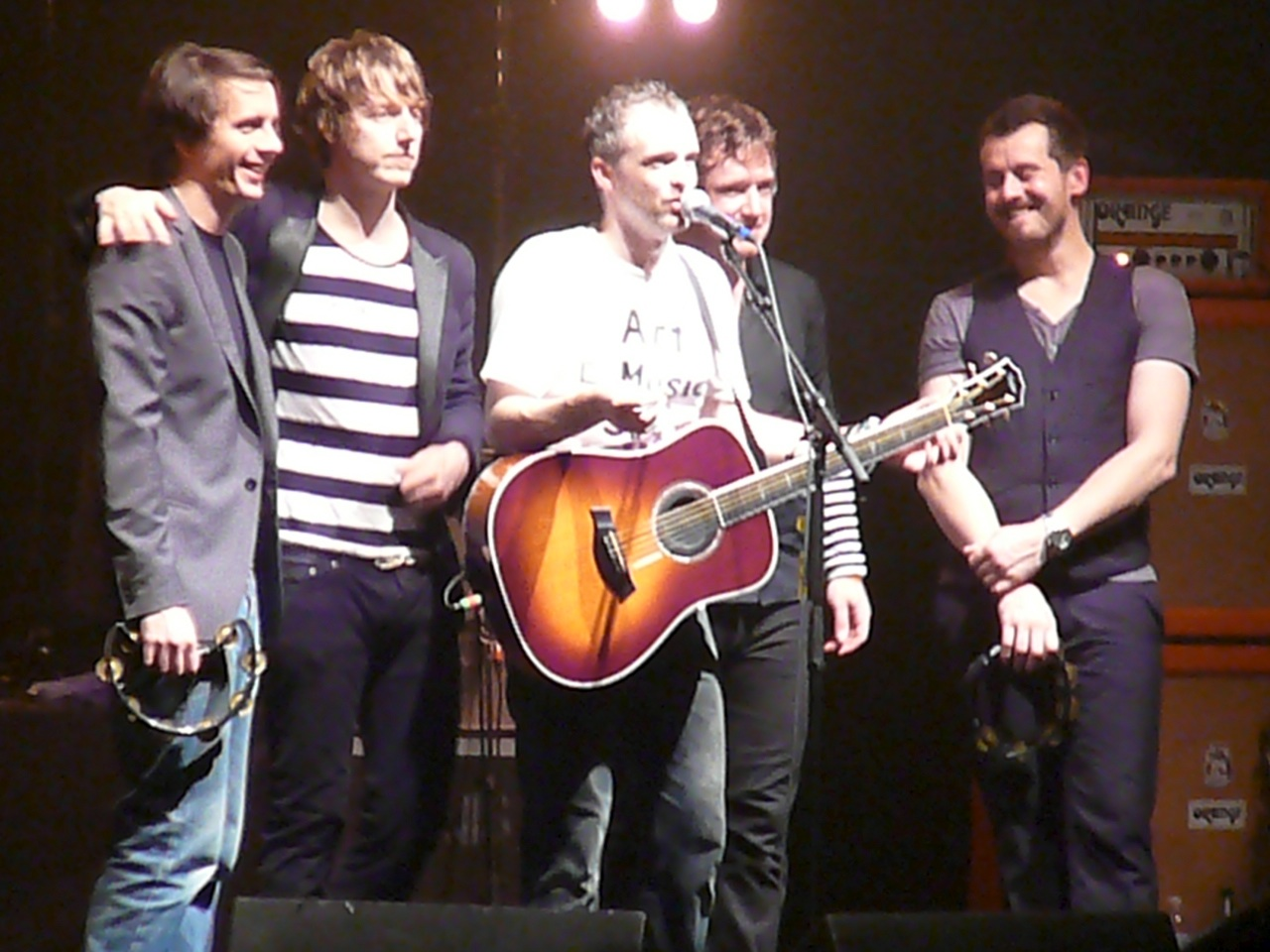
Two-time winner Travis

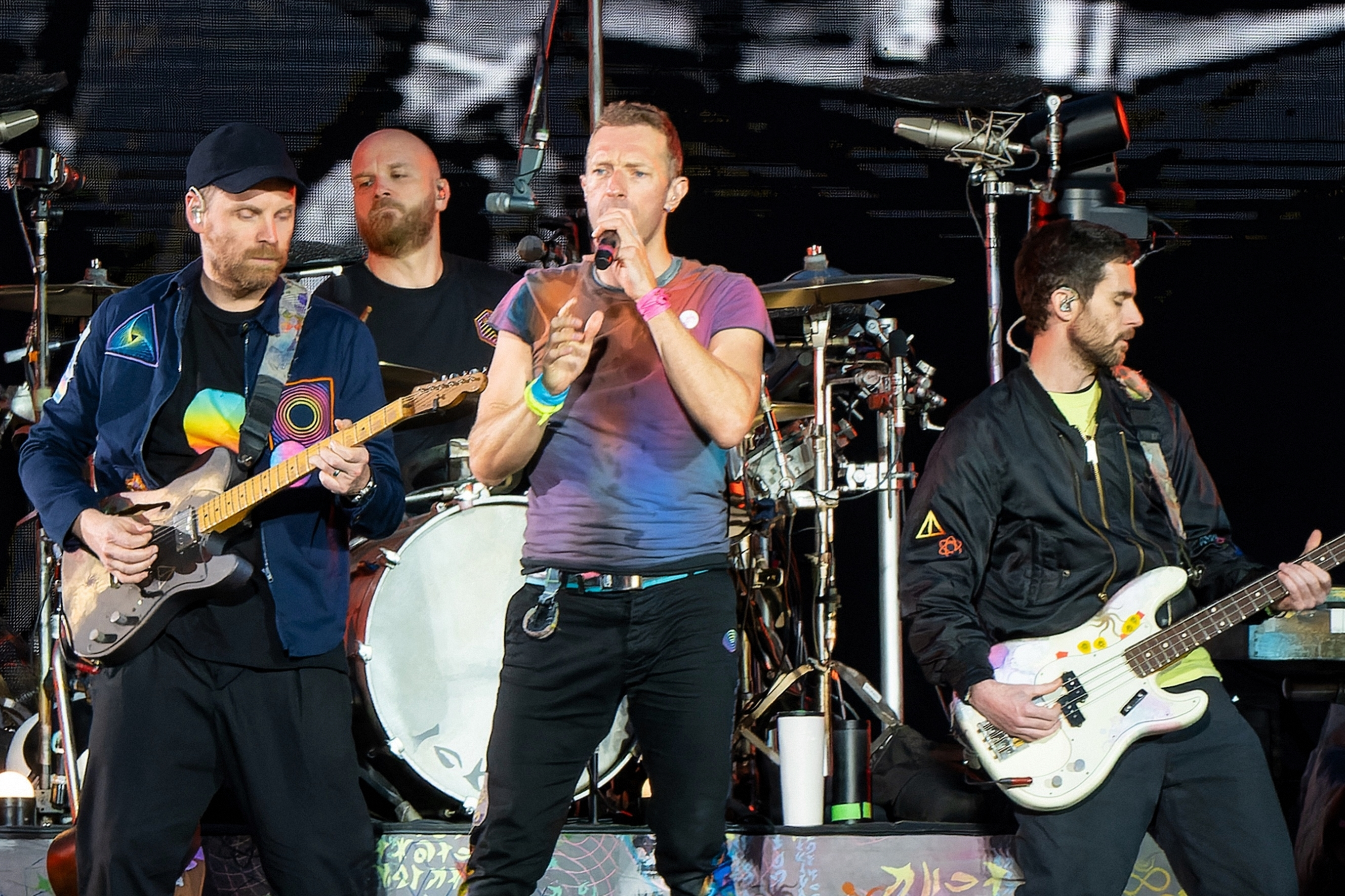
Four-time winner Coldplay

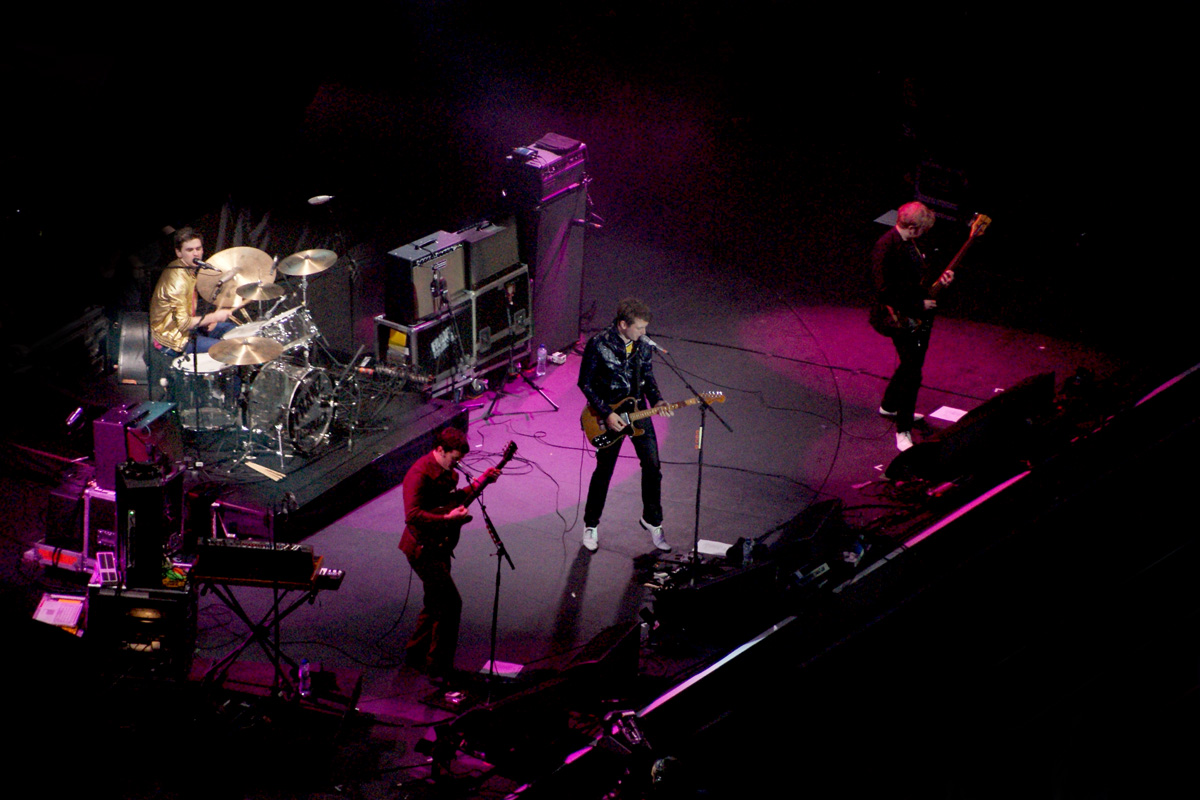
2005 winners Franz Ferdinand

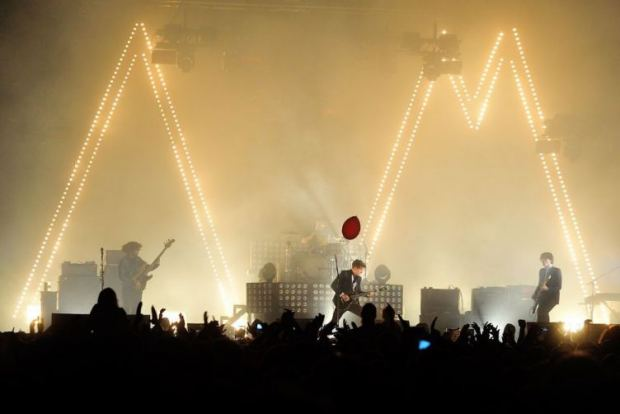
Three-time winner Arctic Monkeys

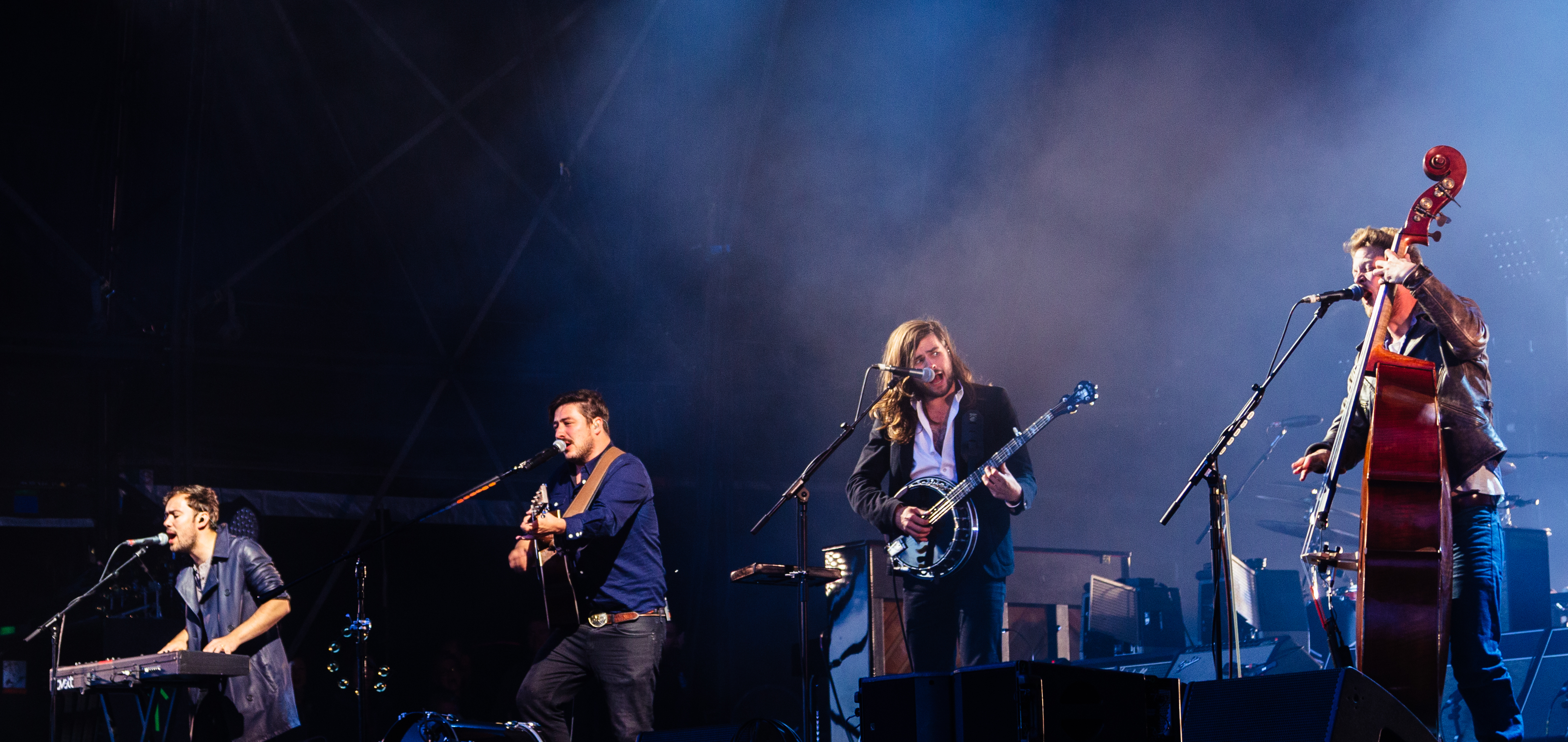
Mumford & Sons received the award in 2013

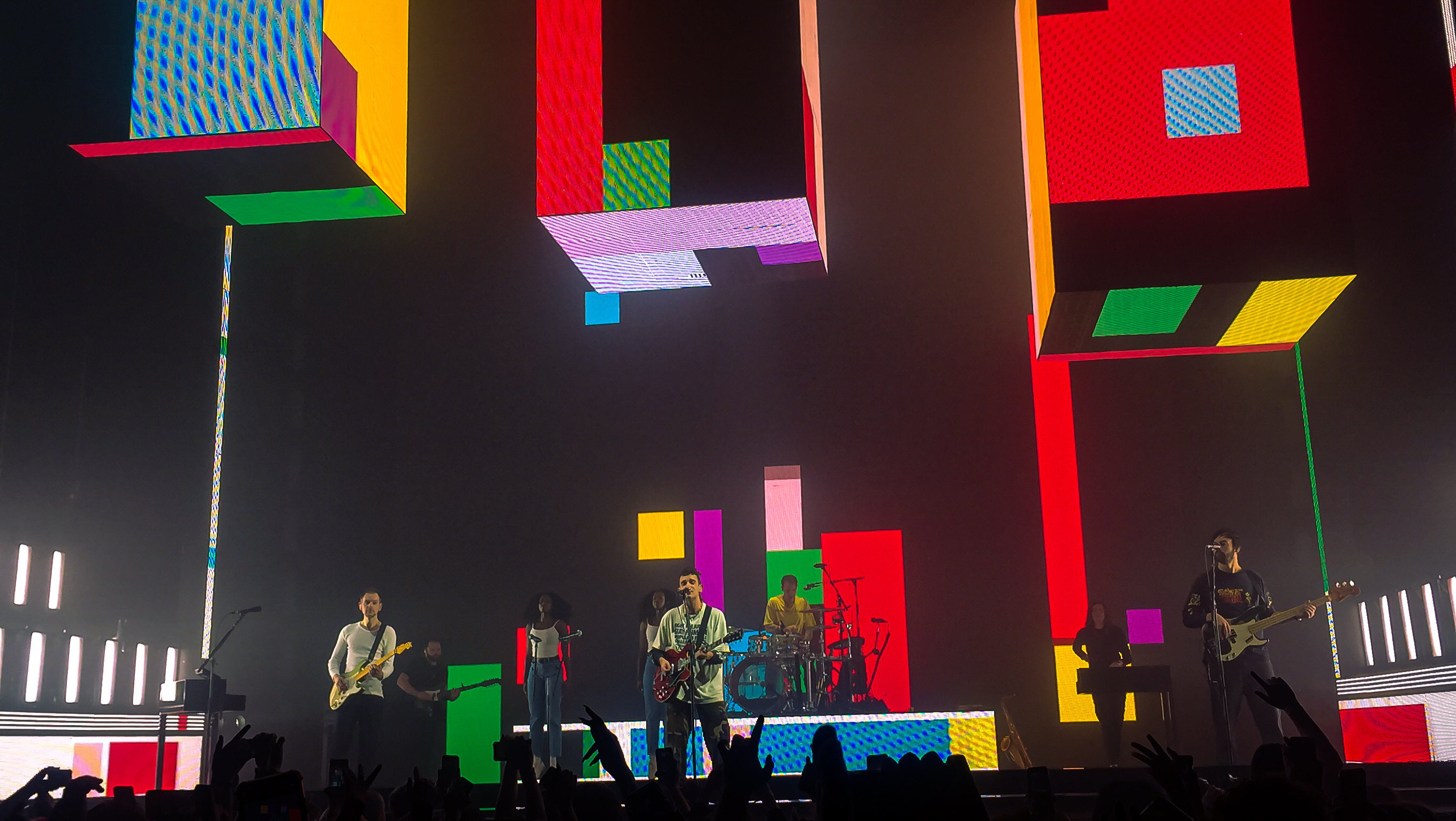
Two-time recipients The 1975

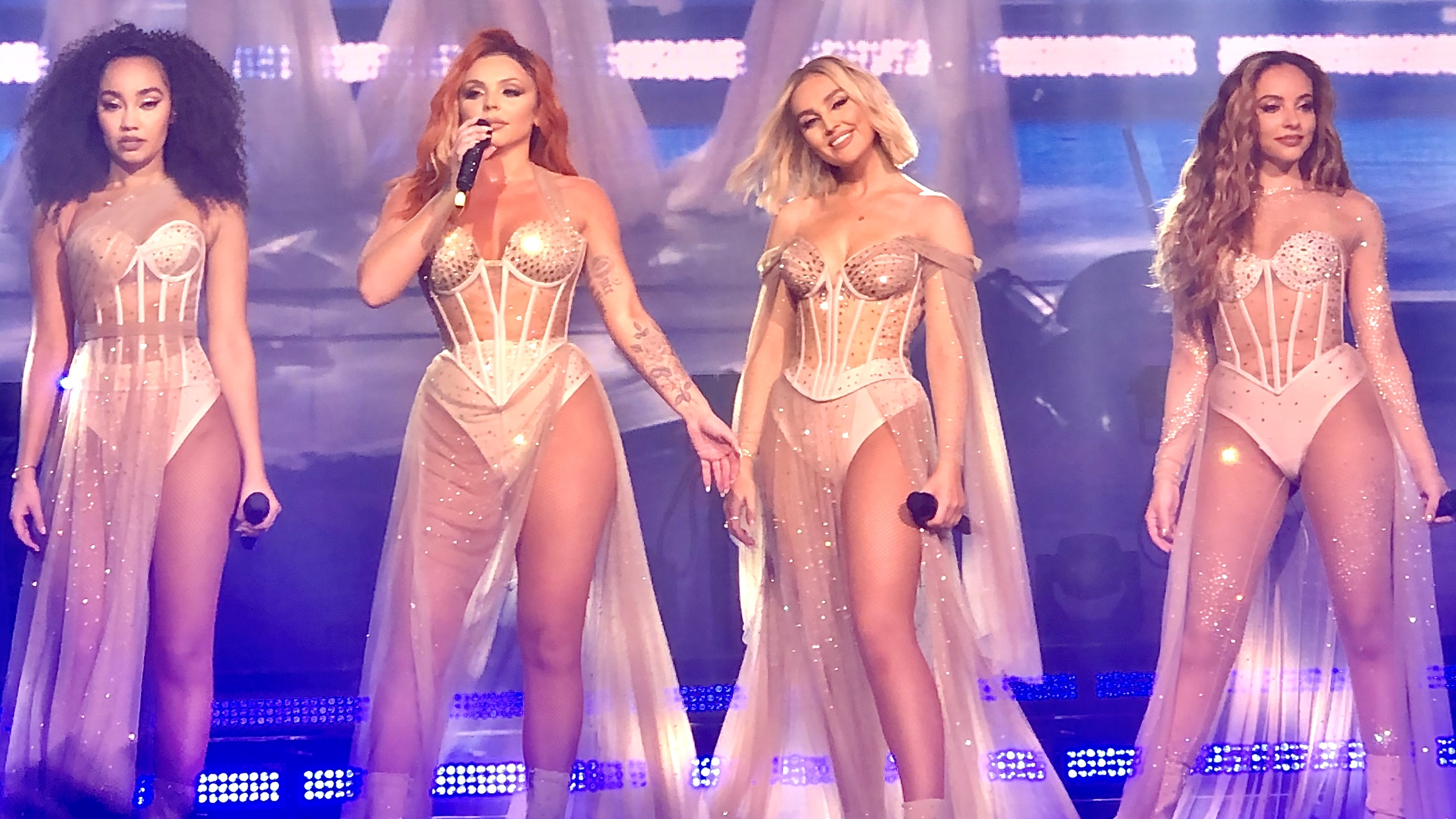
2021 winners Little Mix became the first female group to win

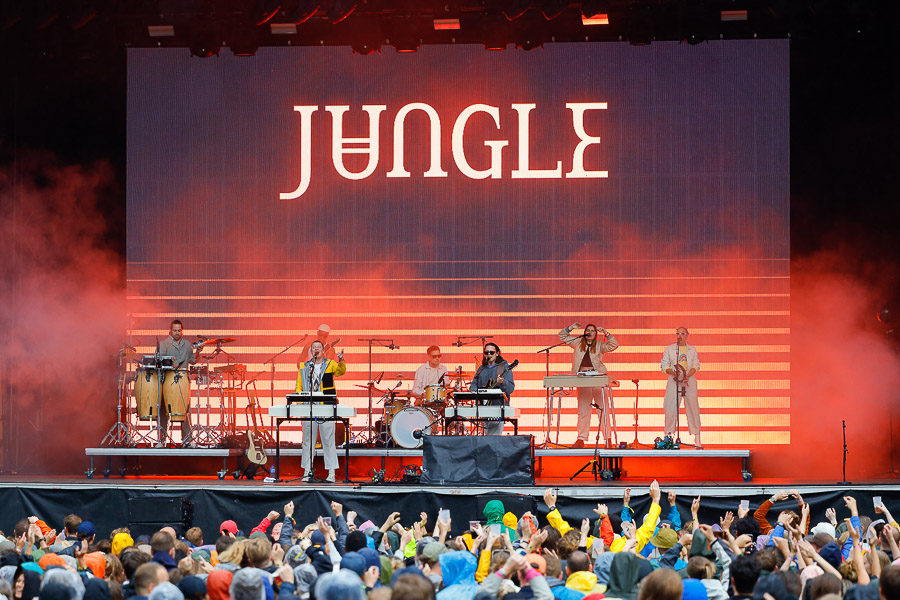
2024 recipients Jungle

Year	Recipient	Nominee
1977	The Beatles	Pink Floyd; The Rolling Stones; The Who
1982	The Police	Adam and the Ants; Madness
1983	Dire Straits	ABC; Yazoo
1984	Culture Club	Eurythmics; Madness; The Police; UB40
1985	Wham!	Bronski Beat; Frankie Goes to Hollywood; Queen; U2
1986	Dire Straits	Eurythmics; Simple Minds; Tears for Fears; U2
1987	Five Star	Dire Straits; Eurythmics; Pet Shop Boys; Simply Red
1988	Pet Shop Boys	Bee Gees; Def Leppard; Level 42; Whitesnake
1989	Erasure	The Christians; Def Leppard; Pet Shop Boys; Wet Wet Wet
1990	Fine Young Cannibals	Erasure; Eurythmics; Simply Red; Soul II Soul; Tears for Fears
1991	The Cure	The Beautiful South; Happy Mondays; Soul II Soul; Talk Talk; The Stone Roses
1992	The KLF and Simply Red	Dire Straits; James; Pet Shop Boys; Queen
1993	Simply Red	The Cure; Erasure; Right Said Fred; Shakespears Sister
1994	Stereo MCs	Jamiroquai; M People; Suede; Take That
1995	Blur	Eternal; M People; Oasis; Pink Floyd
1996	Oasis	Blur; The Lightning Seeds; Pulp; Radiohead
1997	Manic Street Preachers	Kula Shaker; The Lightning Seeds; Ocean Colour Scene; Spice Girls
1998	The Verve	Oasis; The Prodigy; Radiohead; Texas
1999	Manic Street Preachers	The Beautiful South; Catatonia; Gomez; Massive Attack
2000	Travis	Blur; Gomez; Stereophonics; Texas
2001	Coldplay	All Saints; Moloko; Radiohead; Toploader
2002	Travis	Gorillaz; Jamiroquai; Radiohead; Stereophonics
2003	Coldplay	Blue; Doves; Oasis; Sugababes
2004	The Darkness	Busted; The Coral; Radiohead; Sugababes
2005	Franz Ferdinand	Kasabian; Keane; Muse; Snow Patrol
2006	Kaiser Chiefs	Coldplay; Franz Ferdinand; Gorillaz; Hard-Fi
2007	Arctic Monkeys	Kasabian; Muse; Razorlight; Snow Patrol
2008	Arctic Monkeys	Editors; Girls Aloud; Kaiser Chiefs; Take That
2009	Elbow	Coldplay; Girls Aloud; Radiohead; Take That
2010	Kasabian	Doves; Friendly Fires; JLS; Muse
2011	Take That	Biffy Clyro; Gorillaz; Mumford & Sons; The xx
2012	Coldplay	Arctic Monkeys; Chase & Status; Elbow; Kasabian
2013	Mumford & Sons	alt-J; Muse; One Direction; The xx
2014	Arctic Monkeys	Bastille; Disclosure; One Direction; Rudimental
2015	Royal Blood	alt-J; Clean Bandit; Coldplay; One Direction
2016	Coldplay	Blur; Foals; One Direction; Years & Years
2017	The 1975	Bastille; Biffy Clyro; Little Mix; Radiohead
2018	Gorillaz	London Grammar; Royal Blood; Wolf Alice; The xx
2019	The 1975	Arctic Monkeys; Gorillaz; Little Mix; Years & Years
2020	Foals	Bastille; Bring Me the Horizon; Coldplay; D-Block Europe
2021	Little Mix	Bicep; Biffy Clyro; The 1975; Young T & Bugsey
2022	Wolf Alice	Coldplay; D-Block Europe; Little Mix; London Grammar
2023	Wet Leg	The 1975; Arctic Monkeys; Bad Boy Chiller Crew; Nova Twins
2024	Jungle	Blur; Chase & Status; Headie One & K-Trap; Young Fathers
2025	Ezra Collective	Bring Me the Horizon; Coldplay; The Cure; The Last Dinner Party
2026	Wolf Alice	The Last Dinner Party; Pulp; Sleep Token; Wet Leg

== Groups with multiple wins ==
Artists that received multiple awards
Awards	Artist
4	Coldplay
3	Arctic Monkeys
2	The 1975
2	Dire Straits
2	Manic Street Preachers
2	Simply Red
2	Travis
2	Wolf Alice

== Groups with multiple nominations ==
Artists that received multiple nominations
Nominations	Artist
10	Coldplay
7	Radiohead
6	Arctic Monkeys
5	Blur
5	Gorillaz
4	The 1975
4	Dire Straits
4	Eurythmics
4	Kasabian
4	Muse
4	Oasis
4	One Direction
4	Pet Shop Boys
4	Simply Red
4	Take That
4	Little Mix
3	Bastille
3	Erasure
3	The Cure
3	Wolf Alice
3	The xx
2	alt-J
2	The Beautiful South
2	Biffy Clyro
2	Bring Me the Horizon
2	Chase & Status
2	Def Leppard
2	Doves
2	Elbow
2	Franz Ferdinand
2	Girls Aloud
2	Gomez
2	Jamiroquai
2	Kaiser Chiefs
2	The Last Dinner Party
2	The Lightning Seeds
2	Madness
2	Manic Street Preachers
2	M People
2	Mumford & Sons
2	Pink Floyd
2	The Police
2	Pulp
2	Queen
2	Royal Blood
2	Snow Patrol
2	Soul II Soul
2	Stereophonics
2	Sugababes
2	Tears for Fears
2	Texas
2	Travis
2	U2
2	Wet Leg
2	Years & Years
