= Adam and the Ants =

English rock band (1977–1982)

- Adam and the Ants in 1981

Background information
- Origin: London, England
- Genres: New wave; post-punk; punk rock; alternative rock
- Years active: 1977–1982
- Labels: CBS; Do It; Decca
- Past members: Adam Ant; Andy Warren; Paul Flanagan; Lester Square; Mark Ryan; David Barbarossa; Jordan; Johnny Bivouac; Matthew Ashman; Leigh Gorman; Chris "Merrick" Hughes; Terry Lee Miall; Marco Pirroni; Kevin Mooney; Gary Tibbs
- Website: adam-ant.net

Adam and the Ants were an English rock band that formed in London in 1977. Two versions of the band, both fronted by Adam Ant, existed between 1977 and 1982. The first was founded in May 1977 and called the Ants until November of that year. They later changed their style from punk rock to post-punk and new wave and released one album.

The final line-up of this incarnation consisted of Adam Ant, Dave Barbarossa, Matthew Ashman, and Leigh Gorman — all of whom except Ant left in January 1980 at the suggestion of manager Malcolm McLaren to form Bow Wow Wow.

Following this, a second version of Adam and the Ants was formed, with only Ant himself remaining from the original band. It also included guitarist Marco Pirroni and drummer-and-producer Chris Hughes and was noted for its use of Burundi drums. This incarnation existed from February 1980 to March 1982 and achieved significant commercial success in the UK. With their music videos receiving airplay on MTV and Ant appearing as a guest VJ on the station, they are associated in the United States with the Second British Invasion.

In March 1982, Adam and the Ants was disbanded and Ant embarked on a solo career, although he continued working with Pirroni.

== History ==
=== Formation ===
Before forming Adam and the Ants, Adam Ant (Stuart Leslie Goddard) played bass in pub rock group Bazooka Joe, who are now mostly known for headlining the show at which the Sex Pistols played their first gig on 6 November 1975 at Central Saint Martins College of Art and Design. Ant has since recounted how he left the band directly due to a dispute over Sex Pistols' performance, which he was the only member of the band to have enjoyed. While looking to form a new band, Ant befriended some influential figures in the burgeoning London punk scene, most notably Jordan, who worked in Malcolm McLaren's and Vivienne Westwood's SEX boutique. In early 1977, Ant formed a new band named The Ants with Lester Square on guitar, Andy Warren on bass guitar, and Paul Flanagan on drums. Ant inducted the three sidemen into his band at an initial band meeting at the Roxy Club on 23 April 1977, the night of a gig there by Siouxsie and the Banshees. A month later, Square left to finish his course at Hornsey College of Art and he later formed The Monochrome Set.

Square was replaced by Mark Ryan, and this line-up began to play regular gigs starting with the Institute of Contemporary Arts cafe on 10 May 1977 and taking in support slots around London. In early June, Flanagan was replaced with Dave "Barbe" Barbarossa, and this line-up recorded the songs "Plastic Surgery" and "Beat My Guest" at Chappell Studios in London. Ant starred as Kid in the film Jubilee (1978) while the band appeared with the stand-in drummer Kenny Morris from Siouxsie and the Banshees. During a performance of "Plastic Surgery", Ant dislocated his knee. Towards the end of the year, difficulties with management resulted in Ryan being fired and replaced with Johnny Bivouac, while the band's name was extended to Adam and the Ants.

Touring extensively around the UK, often with Siouxsie and the Banshees, Adam and the Ants were unpopular with much of the British music press, who disliked their fetishistic lyrics and imagery. In response, the group formed a strong – and at times ideological – rapport with amateur punk fanzines such as Ripped and Torn, which gave them more favourable coverage. The band built up a strong cult following but struggled to find mainstream success and sign a record deal – apart from the two Jubilee soundtrack songs – until 1978, when they were signed to Decca Records. Al Spicer described this first incarnation of the band as "a fairly standard black-leather, sour-puss punk image, with songs that had a habit of building slowly towards a full-volume 'sturm-und-drang' climax".

=== Early recordings ===
Adam and the Ants made their radio debut on John Peel's BBC Radio 1 show when they recorded a session on 23 January 1978 that included the songs "Deutscher Girls", "It Doesn't Matter", "Puerto Rican" and "Lou" – the latter of which featured the group's manager Jordan on lead vocals, as she regularly did during live performances until 14 May 1978, when she left the band after a gig at Roundhouse. The day after the Peel Session, they re-recorded "Deutscher Girls" and overdubbed a new guitar break on the Chapells Studio version of "Plastic Surgery" at AIR Studios for the Jubilee soundtrack album, which was released later that year. The un-dubbed version can be heard in the film itself.

On 15 May 1978, the afternoon after Jordan's final gig with Adam and the Ants, Bivouac also left the band and soon after was replaced by Matthew Ashman. This line-up continued to demo new material, and on 10 July 1978, they recorded a second Peel Session that featured the songs "Zerox", "Physical", "Friends", and "Cleopatra". At the end of the month, the band signed a contract for two singles with Decca Records. The line-up of Adam Ant (vocals and guitar), Matthew Ashman (guitar), Andy Warren (bass guitar), and Dave Barbe (drums) embarked on their first tour of continental Europe. In October 1978, Decca released their first single "Young Parisians". In November 1978, the band recorded a planned second single of "Zerox" and "Kick" at RAK Studios in London produced by Stephen "Snips" Parsons. but after the first single met with little success, the company abandoned plans for a second release. Additional material was recorded at Decca's studio in West Hampstead, In January 1979, the band embarked on their Young Parisians Tour of the UK, which ran throughout January and February. and the band recorded a third Peel Session on 26 March 1979 that included "Ligotage", "Tabletalk", "Animals & Men", and "Never Trust A Man (With Egg On His Face)".

After the Decca single's release, the band signed with the independent label Do It Records and re-recorded the second single, "Zerox", backed with "Whip In My Valise", at Roundhouse Studios. "Zerox" was released in July 1979, after which the band embarked on a 17-show Zerox Tour around Britain in support, culminating in a sell-out show at London Lyceum on 5 August.

In the middle of August, the band started recording their debut album at Sound Development Studios in London. Ant wrote and produced the material recorded at the sessions, which were completed within twelve days because the band had rehearsed all of the material on stage. After two sell-out shows at Electric Ballroom, Ant sacked Ashman and Warren, Ant and Barbe worked on new material while Ashman and Warren attempted to form a band (with a French singer called Dominique) after which Warren joined The Monochrome Set in early October. He was replaced in the Ants by Leigh Gorman. Ashman soon returned to the Ants and the album was scheduled for a November release.

The album was titled Dirk Wears White Sox; it peaked at number one on the UK Independent Albums Chart, which was launched in early January 1980. Ant asked Malcolm McLaren to take over as manager for a flat fee. Adam and the Ants played a sell-out New Year's Day gig at Electric Ballroom. At the end of January 1980, McLaren persuaded guitarist Matthew Ashman, bassist Leigh Gorman, and drummer Dave Barbe to leave Adam and the Ants and form Bow Wow Wow, which was fronted by Annabella Lwin.

=== Replacement line-up and breakthrough ===
In the following months, a new version of Adam and the Ants was formed. This included Ant himself (the only remaining member from the previous line-up), plus Marco Pirroni (guitar), Kevin Mooney (bass guitar), and drummers Terry Lee Miall and Chris "Merrick" Hughes.

Pirroni became an influential member of the group, regularly co-writing with Ant throughout much of his career. Falcon Stuart was engaged to manage the new band after McLaren had dropped Ant. It signalled a style change by adapting Burundi-style African drumming and an image that mixed Native American make-up with pirate-style, colourful costumes.

While forming the new band, Ant and Pirroni, with future Culture Club drummer Jon Moss, re-recorded the Dirk Wears White Sox track "Cartrouble Part 2" as a contract-fulfilling single for Do It. The label hired Hughes to produce the duo at Rockfield Studios in Wales, after which they asked Hughes to join. The label released the single under the title "Cartrouble" in March 1980, with Moss credited as "Terry 1+2". Ant and Pirroni signed a publishing deal with EMI, and worked with Hughes and the rest of the band on new material at Matrix Studios in London. Stuart took these to prospective record companies while the band embarked on a 14-day Ant-Invasion Tour of the UK, which culminated in a show at Empire Ballroom.

In July 1980, the band signed a deal with CBS Records and released the single "Kings of the Wild Frontier", which reached No. 48 on the UK Singles Chart. Hughes continued to produce the band's work, and they completed recording at Rockfield by the end of August. A second single, "Dog Eat Dog" was released in October; it reached the top 10 and resulted in the band's first appearance on BBC Television's weekly music show Top of the Pops.

In November 1980, the album Kings of the Wild Frontier was released and became a hit in the United Kingdom, putting Adam and the Ants at the forefront of the New Romantic movement, and the band completed a 32-day UK tour. The album reached number one on the UK Albums Chart on 24 January 1981.

A third single "Antmusic" was released later in November; it peaked at number two in January 1981 and at number one in Australia, where it stayed for five weeks. Both Decca and Do It Records re-released the band's previous output; "Young Parisians" reached number nine in the UK in December 1980 and Dirk Wears White Sox peaked at number 16 in the UK Albums Chart in February 1981. "Cartrouble" and "Zerox" also charted that month, peaking at numbers 33 and 45, respectively, in the UK Singles Chart.

In February 1981, Adam and the Ants played at the inaugural Children's Royal Variety Performance, the band played two songs "Antmusic" and "Dog Eat Dog", but bassist Mooney refused to take the performance seriously, and it was later claimed his bass strap had broken. Footage of the performance clearly shows Adam Ant being very annoyed with Mooney and mouthing "what the hell was that?" followed by an obscenity and the end of their set. Mooney was subsequently sacked and replaced with Gary Tibbs. CBS re-released the single "Kings of the Wild Frontier", which peaked at number two in March that year.

=== Major success ===
While the second album and re-released singles brought growing chart success, Hughes, together with Ant, Miall, and Pirroni, recorded the single "Stand and Deliver". The band, which now included Tibbs, filmed a video that depicts the song's "dandy highwayman" story, at Hatfield House. To support the single, the band undertook a six-date theatre tour of Great Britain in March and visited the US for a club tour in April. The single became the band's first UK number-one record, staying at the top for five weeks in May 1981. The band spent much of the summer touring continental Europe before returning to London's AIR Studios to complete their third album. The album's second single was the title track "Prince Charming"; it peaked at number one on the UK Singles Chart for four weeks in September 1981. In the same month, the band embarked on the Prince Charming Revue Tour, for which they travelled to Austria and Japan.

In November 1981, Adam and the Ants released the parent album Prince Charming which spent three weeks at number 2. A third single from the album, "Ant Rap" reached No. 3 in January 1982. The band was one of the most successful single acts in the UK in 1981. All three singles from the album, as well as the previous single "Kings of the Wild Frontier" is listed on the official top 50 best-selling singles of 1981, "Stand and Deliver" and "Prince Charming" as the third and fourth best-selling single respectively. By the end of January 1982 the band had completed their touring obligations.

More of the band's early material was re-released in the first half of 1982. Polydor reissued the two songs for the Jubilee in February as a seven-inch (18 cm) single with "Deutscher Girls" as the A-side; this single reached number 13 on the UK Singles Chart, giving the original Ants a second post-breakup hit. Do It! records released The Antmusic EP, a 12-inch (30 cm) Extended Play (EP) of three unused tracks from the Dirk sessions and a remix of "Cartrouble (Parts 1 & 2)"; the EP peaked at number 46. In early 1982, Adam and the Ants won British Album of the Year for Kings of the Wild Frontier at the BRIT Awards where they were also nominated for Best British Group and twice in the Best British Single category for "Prince Charming" and "Stand and Deliver". They were also nominated for Best New Artist at the 24th Annual Grammy Awards in 1982. Ant and Pirroni also received the Songwriter of the Year Award for "Stand and Deliver" at the 27th Ivor Novello Awards in April 1982.

== Break-up and aftermath ==
In March 1982, Ant disbanded Adam and the Ants. Newspaper articles of the time offered different explanations for the breakup. Initially, Ant was quoted as saying the split was amicable but he later said; "the interest just wasn't there any more. It might have been Adam and the Ants on the billboards but not on stage". It was also reported that Pirroni was tired of touring and quit performing live.

Ant launched a solo career a few months after the split, retaining Pirroni as co-writer. The single "Goody Two Shoes" peaked at number one in the UK, and Ant released more albums during the 1980s. Hughes continued to work as a record producer.

To date, Ant has released six solo studio albums. Songs by both versions of Adam and the Ants have remained staples of his solo live concerts. His partnership with Pirroni continued until the two fell out in March 2010. During the late 2000s and early 2010s, Pirroni was a member of The Wolfmen with Ant's 1982-1985 bassist Chris Constantinou; they released two albums together.

Hughes and Tibbs formed the short-lived duo Merrick and Tibbs and released the single "Call of the Wild" in 1983. It peaked at number 95 in the UK Singles Chart in February that year. Mooney later formed the acts Wide Boy Awake with Jordan, and Max with Ashman.

Barbe's, Ashman's, and Gorman's post-Ants band Bow Wow Wow had two UK Top 10 hits. The trio later formed Chiefs of Relief and released a self-titled album on Sire Records, by which point only Ashman remained. The Monochrome Set, which included Warren and Square, has released fourteen albums to date. Bivouac starred as Strings in the BBC Television police comedy Operation Good Guys.

== Re-releases ==
In 1990, a ten-track selection of the early radio sessions was released as Peel Sessions. All three sessions appeared in full on the 2001 album The Complete Radio 1 Sessions with a 1995 acoustic session by Ant, Pirroni and Boz Boorer.

Antbox, a retrospective box-set spanning Ant's career from the late 1970s to the 1990s was released in 2000. The box set included 66 tracks on three CDs and quickly sold the initial 10,000 units. In 2003, Antbox was re-released in a different form with the same tracks and was commercially successful.

In 2004, the albums Dirk Wears White Sox, Kings of the Wild Frontier, and Prince Charming were digitally remastered and re-released with previously unreleased demo songs as bonus material. These were overseen by Pirroni, and Kings of the Wild Frontier and Prince Charming were remastered by Hughes.

In 2014, Ant, Barbe, and Gorman, the surviving three-quarters of the December 1979 - January 1980 lineup, reunited to perform with selected members of Ant's current band; they performed Dirk Wears White Sox in its entirety and in sequence at Hammersmith Apollo, to promote the album's reissue on Ant's Blueblack Hussar label.

Ant and his regular band subsequently performed the album for four nights at Islington Assembly Hall in November 2014 and on a full UK tour in Spring 2015. The Dirk-performance section, and other portions of the Hammersmith concert, were released on DVD in 2015 as Dirk Live At The Apollo. In 2016, this exercise was repeated with the Kings of the Wild Frontier album, which was performed on tour in the UK and the US to promote a deluxe-gold vinyl reissue by Sony Records, which charted in the UK Albums Chart at number 69. The Singles, a compilation credited to Adam and the Ants but also featuring Adam Ant solo material, was released in 2025

== Legacy ==
The visual aspect formed a large part of the impact of Adam and the Ants, especially at the height of their success between 1980 and early 1982. Al Spicer noted, "Adam's career is better defined by his changing image than his music". Together with their music videos and flamboyant stage presence, Adam and the Ants had significant mainstream success that was dubbed "Antmania" in the British press. Simon Reynolds called Antmania a combination of "heroic imagery, sexmusic and tribalism" while highlighting the early influence of Malcom McLaren. Paul Evans of Rolling Stone's album guide described the band as "leering, self-mythologising ... loopy faux-teen fun" and Ant as a "the campiest figurehead of the New Romantic moment". Commentators also noted the links between Antmania and the glam-rock of Marc Bolan and David Bowie in the 1970s.

The band seized the opportunities provided by music videos on the new channel MTV to develop a theatrical, charismatic, and heroic persona. With romantic costumes and heavy make-up, the band was often seen as an early example of the New Romantic movement, though Adam Ant has always denied any connection with that movement. Lavish videos were produced for "Stand and Deliver", "Prince Charming", and "Ant Rap". All Adam and the Ants music videos were produced and storyboarded by Ant; these videos helped to establish the band in the United States when MTV began airing them in 1981. The "Prince Charming" video includes a guest appearance by British film actor Diana Dors as the Fairy Godmother, and the video for "Ant Rap" includes Scottish pop singer Lulu as the "damsel in distress".

The band is mentioned in the Last of the Summer Wine episode "The Waist Land".

In early 1995, Ant and Pirroni joined Nine Inch Nails on stage to perform "Physical (You're So)", "Red Scab", and "Beat My Guest"; three songs from Adam and the Ants' early catalogue. Nine Inch Nails also covered "Physical (You're So)" on their 1992 EP Broken.

On 8 May 2006, Hyper released their debut album We Control, which includes a cover of "Antmusic" with Leeroy Thornhill of The Prodigy on lead vocals. In April 2009, No Doubt performed a cover of "Stand and Deliver" on the US television show Gossip Girl episode "Valley Girls", and performed it at The Bamboozle music festival in May 2009.

In 2011, CBBC programme Horrible Histories featured the song "Dick Turpin", which is a pastiche on Adam and the Ants' "Stand and Deliver".

A short film starring Nick Moran as Ant and Mackenzie Crook as Tibbs, called Ant Muzak (2002), depicts Adam and the Ants visiting a supermarket late at night at the same time as Sigue Sigue Sputnik. Tibbs appears in the film as Dirk, the supermarket manager, and wears white socks.

== Members ==
- Adam Ant – vocals, guitar, harmonica (1977–1982), piano (1978–1981), bass (1981–1982)
- Andy Warren – bass (1977–1979)
- Paul Flanagan – drums (1977)
- Lester Square – guitar (1977)
- Mark Ryan – guitar (1977; died 2011)
- Dave Barbarossa – drums (1977–1980)
- Jordan - vocals (1977–1978; died 2022)
- Johnny Bivouac – guitar (1977–1978)
- Matthew Ashman – guitar (1978–1979, 1979–1980; died 1995), piano (1979)
- Leigh Gorman – bass (1979–1980)
- Chris "Merrick" Hughes – drums (1980–1982), acoustic guitar (1981), piano (1981–1982)
- Terry Lee Miall – drums (1980–1982)
- Marco Pirroni – guitar (1980–1982)
- Kevin Mooney – bass (1980–1981)
- Gary Tibbs – bass (1981–1982)

=== Lineups ===
Early 1977 - 10 May 1977	10 May 1977 - Early June 1977	Early June 1977 - October 1977	October 1977 - May 1978
Adam Ant - vocals, guitar, harmonica; Paul Flanagan - drums; Lester Square - guitar; Andy Warren - bass	Adam Ant - vocals, guitar, harmonica; Paul Flanagan - drums; Andy Warren - bass; Mark Ryan - guitar	Adam Ant - vocals, guitar, harmonica; Andy Warren - bass; Mark Ryan - guitar; Dave Barbarossa - drums; Jordan - vocals	Adam Ant - vocals, guitar, harmonica; Andy Warren - bass; Dave Barbarossa - drums; Johnny Bivouac - guitar; Jordan - vocals
June 1978 - September 1979	October 1979 - November 1979	December 1979 - 26 January 1980	February 1980 - Early 1981
Adam Ant - vocals, guitar, bass, piano, harmonica; Andy Warren - bass; Dave Barbarossa - drums; Matthew Ashman - guitar	Adam Ant - vocals, guitar, piano, harmonica; Dave Barbarossa - drums	Adam Ant - vocals, guitar, piano, harmonica; Dave Barbarossa - drums; Matthew Ashman - guitar; Leigh Gorman - bass	Adam Ant - vocals, guitar, piano, harmonica; Chris "Merrick" Hughes - drums; Terry Lee Miall - drums; Kevin Mooney - bass; Marco Pirroni - guitar
Early 1981 - March 1982
Adam Ant - vocals, guitar, bass, harmonica; Chris "Merrick" Hughes - drums, acoustic guitar, piano; Terry Lee Miall - drums; Marco Pirroni - guitar; Gary Tibbs - bass

== Discography ==
- Dirk Wears White Sox (1979)
- Kings of the Wild Frontier (1980)
- Prince Charming (1981)

== Awards ==
Year	Nominated work	Award	Result
1982	Adam and the Ants	Grammy Award: Best New Artist	Nominated
1982	Adam and the Ants	Brit Awards: British Group	Nominated
1982	"Prince Charming"	Brit Awards: British Single	Nominated
1982	"Stand and Deliver"	Brit Awards: British Single	Nominated
1982	Kings of the Wild Frontier	Brit Awards: British Album	Won
1982	"Stand and Deliver"	Ivor Novello Awards: Songwriters of the Year	Won
