= Mark Ryan (guitarist) =

English guitarist

- Born: 2 March 1959; Tottenham, London, England
- Died: 31 January 2011 (aged 51); Cardiff, Wales
- Other names: Mark Gaumont; The Kid
- Occupations: Musician, playwright
- Known for: British guitarist (the Ants, the Photons); playwright

Mark Ryan (2 March 1959 – 31 January 2011) was an English guitarist who played in different punk bands during the late 1970s.

He was born in Tottenham, London, to an Irish Catholic family. His father was a university lecturer and his mother was a nurse and midwife. Ryan left school at sixteen, working in factories and dedicating his spare time to music.

In 1977, after being in a number of experimental punk bands, he joined the Ants, replacing Lester Square, to complete the line-up who debuted live at the ICA restaurant in May, and recorded Plastic Surgery and a number of demos with the band. After appearing with the band in the Derek Jarman film Jubilee (released in July 1977) Ryan was fired in October 1977, shortly before the band lengthened their name to the more familiar Adam and the Ants. Subsequently, he joined the Photons, and was involved with the Moors Murderers. The vocalist in both bands was Steve Strange, who later became the singer of Visage. He also was in King, alongside the Damned's Captain Sensible.

From 1985 to 1989, Ryan attended the Dartington College of Arts, earning a bachelor's degree in music in 1989. He turned his interest in performance to the theatre and began a successful career as a writer for the stage based in Cardiff, Wales. He is the author of The Strange Case of Dr Jekyll and Mr Hyde as Told to Carl Jung by an Inmate of Broadmoor Asylum, first produced in 1998.

== Death ==
Ryan lived in Heath, Cardiff, Wales for many years until his death there on 31 January 2011, aged 51. Ryan had suffered from ill-health, and succumbed to complications caused by liver damage.

Preceded by Lester Square	The Ants lead guitarist 1977	Succeeded by Johnny Bivouac
