= Dirk Wears White Sox =

- Original 1979 cover

Studio album by Adam and the Ants
- Released: 30 November 1979
- Recorded: 12–24 August 1979
- Studios: Sound Development Studios, London
- Genres: Post-punk; art rock
- Length: 40:39
- Label: Do It
- Producer: Adam Ant

Adam and the Ants chronology
Dirk Wears White Sox (1979)	Kings of the Wild Frontier (1980)

Alternative cover
- 1983 US reissue cover

Dirk Wears White Sox is the debut studio album by the English new wave band Adam and the Ants. It was released on 30 November 1979 by record label Do It. It was the first number one album on the UK Independent Albums Chart when the chart debuted in Record Week in 1980.

== Background ==
Dirk Wears White Sox was made with an early line-up of Adam and the Ants, which disbanded after the album was released. Guitarist Matthew Ashman and drummer David Barbarossa went on to form Bow Wow Wow with then-Ants bassist Leigh Gorman (who only played one gig with the Ants and was not involved in any studio recordings). Original bassist Andy Warren had departed shortly after recording the album to join former Ants guitarist Lester Square in The Monochrome Set. Many of the songs, notably "Cleopatra" and "Never Trust a Man (With Egg on his Face)", remained a part of Adam Ant's live repertoire throughout his career, both with the Ants and later as a solo artist.

The album title refers to classic British film icon Dirk Bogarde.

== Production ==
The album was recorded 12–24 August 1979 at Sound Development Studios, London and mixed 25–29 August. All instrumentation and guide vocals were completed in the first three days. Of the fourteen tracks recorded, three - "Friends", "Kick" and "Physical" - were unfinished at this time, although "Physical" was later issued as the B-side on 2000 copies of the single "Zerox" in July, 1980. The remainder of the sessions were dedicated to recording finished lead and backing vocals for the eleven released tracks.

Five tracks from the album, "Day I Met God", "Cleopatra", "Catholic Day", "Never Trust A Man (With Egg On His Face)" and "Family of Noise" - plus the three rejected tracks - had previously been recorded in 1978 for the Ants' first label Decca Records - "Kick" at RAK Studios in Chalbert Street, London, produced by Snips, the other seven at Decca's own studio at Broadhurst Gardens, West Hampstead, produced by Ant himself. Prior to this, all songs on the released album except "Digital Tenderness", "Nine Plan Failed" and "Cleopatra" were recorded on 4-track by Ant at home in Notting Hill Gate 25–27 July, 1978; "Cleopatra" and "Physical" had been similarly taped by Ant at home in Chelsea, 20 November, 1977.

== Musical style ==
Ant biographer James Maw reports in his 1981 book The Official Adam Ant Story that Ant wished to make "a stylish album with all the qualities of soul and funk." Ant confirmed in a 2014 interview for Classic Pop that the album was "me trying to make a Donna Summer record... I know it doesn't sound like that, but check out Dave (Barbe)'s drumming."

Mojo's Danny Eccleston classifies Dirk Wears White Sox as a post-punk album. Chris Woodstra of AllMusic described the album's style as a "sometimes-awkward fusion of punk, glam and minimalist post-punk with bizarre images and disturbing tales of alienation, sex and brutality." Peter Parrish of Stylus Magazine wrote that "Dirk slips somewhere between The Banshee's [sic] Scream and Gang of Four's Entertainment; all stark, angular and brittle."

The album has been cited as an influence on the nascent gothic rock scene. Andi Sex Gang from Sex Gang Children and John Robb referenced the record as part of the British Library's Goth: The Scene That Wouldn't Die, 2014.

== Releases ==
Dirk Wears White Sox was released on 30 November 1979 by Do It Records. The three out-takes were later released in 1982 as the 7 inch EP The B-Sides as well as a 12-inch EP The Antmusic EP also containing a remix of Cartrouble (Parts 1 & 2).

The album was reissued in the United States in 1983, featuring a different album cover taken from a December 1979 video for the song "Zerox". "Catholic Day" and "Day I Met God" were dropped and "Cartrouble (Parts 1 and 2)" were replaced by "Cartrouble" in its single version and its B-side, a re-recording of "Kick!" which contained completely different lyrics from the rejected album version and featured Jon Moss (who later went on to join Culture Club) on drums. This edition also adds two other songs from the same era not on the original LP: both sides of the "Zerox"/ "Whip in My Valise" single.

It was reissued again in 1995 by Sony, featuring the original black-and-white album art in somewhat cropped form and with the dropped songs reinstated as bonus tracks at the end. The lettering on the sleeve was recreated in the style of the original and does not feature the stroke through the letter O in the word "Sox"; it also substitutes a letter "Z" in place of the zig-zagged "S" in the word "Ants" (previously a common practice among unofficial merchandisers around the time of the album's original release). Later pressings of the 1995 edition substituted the Antmusic EP remix of "Cartrouble (Parts 1 & 2)" in place of the "Cartrouble" A-side.

The album was remastered and reissued in 2004 with the original track listing restored and the singles/EP material included as bonus tracks.

A white vinyl edition was released by Ant's own label Blueblack Hussar Records in spring 2014. To tie in with this, on 19 April, Ant performed the full album at the Hammersmith Apollo with a band including former Ants David Barbarossa and Leigh Gorman, preceding this with several UK tour dates. A launch party gig for the white vinyl album was held at the 100 Club. Both London concerts were filmed and later released as the DVD album Dirk Live at the Apollo. Ant would subsequently perform the full album again with his regular band for four nights at the Islington Assembly Hall in November 2014 and a full UK tour in spring 2015.

== Reception ==
Professional ratings
Review scores
Source	Rating
AllMusic	4.5/5 stars
The Great Rock Discography	6/10
The Rolling Stone Album Guide	3.5/5 stars
Stylus Magazine	B−
Uncut	5/5 stars

During their lifetime, the original Ants were subject to much hostility - even abuse - from the UK music press. An example of this was a highly negative joint review by Paul Morley of both Dirk and the upcoming Throbbing Gristle album 20 Jazz Funk Greats, for the NME under the headline "Berks That Lurk In The Corner Of Your Psyche." Ant remained aggrieved about this review in later years, commenting in a 2010 interview by Simon Price for The Quietus that he was upset how Morley "is now being commissioned by Sony to write my liner notes ... Go and write for Frankie Goes to Hollywood. Or go on TV and talk shit for three hours. That represents the old school. He's fucked. He's got no credibility. Fuck him." Do It label manager Ian Tregoning likewise denounced Morley's review as "garbage - it didn't even qualify as garbage."

Retrospective reviews have generally taken a more concilliatory tone. In his retrospective review of the album for AllMusic, Chris Woodstra wrote that "while the somewhat pretentious, overly arty lyrics and inexperienced playing are a drawback, the album offers a fascinating look at the Ants' formative years, capturing a raw energy that would be sacrificed for more polish on subsequent releases." Reviewing its 2004 reissue in Stylus Magazine, Peter Parrish called the album a "rather marvellous record of jagged jitters" and found that it "sounds a great deal more contemporary than later Ants material." Uncut likewise opined that unlike the band's subsequent albums, Dirk Wears White Sox "sounds as though it was made last week". Trouser Press was more critical, describing Ant's vocals as "dour" and "uncomfortable" and the band as sounding "dead" and "far too slow", though noting that the 1983 version is "far better" than the 1979 version.

== Track listing ==
All tracks are written by Adam Ant.

Side A
No.	Title	Length
1.	"Cartrouble (Parts 1 & 2)"	6:49
2.	"Digital Tenderness"	3:04
3.	"Nine Plan Failed"	5:12
4.	"Day I Met God"	2:58
5.	"Tabletalk"	5:33

Side B
No.	Title	Length
1.	"Cleopatra"	3:16
2.	"Catholic Day"	3:06
3.	"Never Trust a Man (With Egg on His Face)"	3:14
4.	"Animals and Men"	3:18
5.	"Family of Noise"	2:37
6.	"The Idea"	3:26

=== 1983 reissue ===
Side A
No.	Title	Length
1.	"Cartrouble"	3:23
2.	"Kick!"	2:05
3.	"Digital Tenderness"	3:03
4.	"Nine Plan Failed"	3:10
5.	"Family of Noise"	2:34
6.	"Tabletalk"	5:33

Side B
No.	Title	Length
1.	"Zerox"	3:45
2.	"Cleopatra"	3:15
3.	"Never Trust a Man (With Egg on His Face)"	3:13
4.	"Animals and Men"	3:16
5.	"The Idea"	3:24
6.	"Whip in My Valise"	3:58

=== 1995 reissue ===
No.	Title	Length
1.	"Cartrouble (Parts 1 & 2)"	6:51
2.	"Kick!"	2:05
3.	"Digital Tenderness"	3:03
4.	"Nine Plan Failed"	3:10
5.	"Family of Noise"	2:34
6.	"Tabletalk"	5:33
7.	"Zerox"	3:45
8.	"Cleopatra"	3:15
9.	"Never Trust a Man (With Egg on His Face)"	3:13
10.	"Animals and Men"	3:16
11.	"The Idea"	3:24
12.	"Whip in My Valise"	3:58
13.	"Catholic Day"	3:08
14.	"Day I Met God"	2:58

=== 2004 reissue ===
No.	Title	Length
1.	"Cartrouble (Parts 1 & 2)"	6:51
2.	"Digital Tenderness"	3:03
3.	"Nine Plan Failed"	5:18
4.	"Day I Met God"	2:58
5.	"Tabletalk"	5:34
6.	"Cleopatra"	3:15
7.	"Catholic Day"	3:08
8.	"Never Trust a Man (With Egg on His Face)"	3:13
9.	"Animals and Men"	3:20
10.	"Family of Noise"	2:36
11.	"The Idea"	3:26
12.	"Zerøx"	3:48
13.	"Whip in My Valise"	4:00
14.	"Kick!"	1:36
15.	"Physical"	3:59
16.	"Cartrouble (Parts 1 & 2)" (remix)	6:36
17.	"Friends"	2:40
18.	"Cartrouble" (single version)	3:24
19.	"Kick!" (single version)	2:06

2004 reissue notes

- Tracks 1–11 from original November 1979 album release; tracks 12 and 13 from original July 1979 7" release; tracks 14–17 from original March 1982 12" EP release; tracks 18 and 19 from original March 1980 7" release.

== Personnel ==
Track numbers relate to the 2004 reissue.

Adam and the Ants

- Adam Ant – electric and acoustic guitars, vocals, piano, harmonica, bass on tracks 18 and 19
- David Barbarossa (as Dave Barbe) – drums on tracks 1–17
- Matthew Ashman – guitar and piano on tracks 1–17
- Andrew Warren – bass on tracks 1–17

Additional personnel

- Marco Pirroni – guitar, bass and vocals on tracks 18 and 19
- Jon Moss – drums on tracks 18 and 19

Technical

- Adam Ant – producer on tracks 1–17
- Chris Hughes – producer on tracks 18 and 19, remix on track 16
- Benny King – engineer on tracks 1–17
- Paul Ludgate – assistant engineer on tracks 1–17
- Hugh Jones – engineer on tracks 18 and 19
- Clare Johnson – front cover concept, photography, models dress
- Juanito Antonio Wadhwani – front cover concept, photography
- Derek Bradbury – graphics, layout
- Philip Grey – inner sleeve portraits

== Charts ==
Chart (1980–81)	Peak position
UK Albums (Official Charts)	16
UK Independent Albums (Record Business)	1

== Certifications ==
Region	Certification	Certified units/sales
United Kingdom (BPI)	Gold	100,000^{^}
^{^} Shipments figures based on certification alone.
