= Kings of the Wild Frontier =

- Photography by Peter Ashworth

Studio album by Adam and the Ants
- Released: 7 November 1980
- Recorded: 18 April – 30 August 1980
- Studios: Matrix (London); Rockfield (Monmouth, Wales)
- Genres: New wave; rock and roll; pop
- Length: 41:33; 61:17 (2004 reissue)
- Labels: CBS Records (UK); Epic (international)
- Producer: Chris Hughes

Adam and the Ants chronology
Dirk Wears White Sox (1979)	Kings of the Wild Frontier (1980)	Prince Charming (1981)

Singles from Kings of the Wild Frontier
- 1. "Kings of the Wild Frontier" Released: 25 July 1980; 2. "Dog Eat Dog" Released: 3 October 1980; 3. "Antmusic" Released: 28 November 1980

Kings of the Wild Frontier is the second studio album by the English new wave band Adam and the Ants. It was released on 7 November 1980 by CBS Records in the UK and Epic Records internationally. The album was the best-selling album in the UK in 1981 (and the 48th best seller in 1980) and won Best British Album at the 1982 Brit Awards.

== Background and recording ==
Following the release of Adam and the Ants' debut, Dirk Wears White Sox, former Sex Pistols manager Malcolm McLaren persuaded drummer David Barbarossa (also known as Dave Barbe), bassist Leigh Gorman and guitarist Matthew Ashman to leave the band to form a new group he was managing, Bow Wow Wow. Gorman's predecessor as bassist, Andy Warren, had departed shortly after recording the album to join former Ants guitarist Lester Square in The Monochrome Set. Adam Ant put together a new line up of Ants that included Marco Pirroni on guitar, Kevin Mooney on bass and two drummers, Terry Lee Miall and Chris Hughes (formerly of Dalek I Love You), who used the name "Merrick". Pirroni also became Ant's new song writing partner.

== Release and commercial performance ==
Kings of the Wild Frontier reached No. 1 in the UK Album Chart and spawned three hit singles: "Kings of the Wild Frontier", which was released in July and reached No. 2 in the UK Singles Chart; "Dog Eat Dog", which reached No. 4; and "Antmusic", released in December and reaching No. 2, as well as No. 1 in Australia for five weeks.

Initial UK copies of the album featured a different version of "Antmusic" that started with a fade-in, but after the song became a hit the subsequent pressings used the 7" single mix with the familiar drumstick intro. The US version of the album dropped "Making History" in favour of two tracks penned by Ant prior to teaming up with Marco Pirroni, "(You're So) Physical" and "Press Darlings".

The album was remastered and reissued in 2004 with several bonus tracks.

A multi-disc "Super Deluxe Edition" was released 20 May 2016. It includes a DVD of the long out-of-print Ants in Japan concert video and a CD of a 1981 concert from Chicago. This edition scraped a single week in the UK Album Chart in its own right at number 69 and is considered to be a separate chart hit from the original album (rather than a 67th week for the album as a whole) Ant performed the entire album live on tour in the UK that year, and in the United States, Australia and New Zealand in 2017.

== Cover ==
Photographer Peter Ashworth wrote, "On 5 August 1980, prior to his first slot on Top of the Pops, Adam Ant got the band together in a small rehearsal room in Brixton to create a video test. Shooting stills from the monitor screen during the band performance produced some powerful images. Two days later a repeat shoot from the video recording, in a blacked-out studio, produced the sleeve image..."

== Reception ==
Professional ratings
Review scores
Source	Rating
AllMusic	4.5/5 stars
Classic Rock	5/5 stars
Mojo	5/5 stars
Q	4/5 stars
Record Collector	5/5 stars
The Rolling Stone Album Guide	3.5/5 stars
Smash Hits	8/10
Spin Alternative Record Guide	9/10
Uncut	8/10
The Village Voice	B

Reviewing the US edition for The Village Voice in March 1981, Robert Christgau judged the album as a response to British punk rock nihilism: "The music, needless to say, is rock and roll, a clever pop-punk amalgam boasting two drummers, lots of chanting, and numerous B-movie hooks. Especially given Adam's art-schooled vocals, I find that the hooks grate, but that may just mean that when it comes to futuristic warriors I prefer Sandinistas."

In his retrospective review, Stephen Thomas Erlewine of AllMusic called it "one of the great defining albums of its time. There's simply nothing else like it, nothing else that has the same bravado, the same swagger, the same gleeful self-aggrandizement and sense of camp. This walked a brilliant line between campiness and art-house chutzpah, and it arrived at precisely the right time – at the forefront of new wave". Trouser Press cites it as the album where Adam Ant "found his groove".

== Legacy ==
Kings of the Wild Frontier is credited with introducing the "Burundi beat" sound to popular music. It is included in the book 1001 Albums You Must Hear Before You Die. It is also one of twenty CDs in the Great British Albums box set released by Sony Records in 2012.

In 1992, Nine Inch Nails released a cover version of "Physical (You're So)" on the EP Broken, remade in an industrial rock style with more aggressive guitars and vocals than the original. In 2020, Rolling Stone included Kings of the Wild Frontier in their "80 Greatest albums of 1980" list.

== Cultural references ==
The appearance of the band and the songs on the album reference and quote numerous cultural sources in both lyrics and music. The abiding themes are drawn from a stew of popular, historical and contemporary sources to create an immersive tableau of pop-mythology. The title track evokes Davy Crockett, and media representations thereof, and posits the band and its followers as a new royal family. "Dog Eat Dog" was inspired by a quotation attributed to Margaret Thatcher. "Feed Me To The Lions" includes a musical quotation of the theme from the film Lawrence of Arabia. "Los Rancheros" refers to Clint Eastwood. As well as evoking the film Them!, "Ants Invasion" mentions a 'Forbidden Zone' as in the 1968 film of Planet of the Apes (a theme returned to on the following year's "Picasso Visita el Planeta de los Simios"). "Killer In The Home" quotes Apocalypse Now in its lyrics. "The Magnificent Five" homages The Magnificent Seven, and quotes Friedrich Nietzsche. "Don't Be Square (Be There)" refers to an earlier, unreleased Adam and the Ants song, which itself obliquely referenced the actor Dirk Bogarde. "Jolly Roger" is musically identical with the theme to Seven Guns for the MacGregors, composed by Ennio Morricone. "Making History" quotes Night of the Living Dead. "The Human Beings" lyrical content consists almost entirely of the chanted names of Native American tribes Blackfoot, Pawnee, Cheyenne, Crow and the name of Goklayeh, a Bedonkohe Apache leader.

== Track listing ==
All tracks are written by Adam Ant and Marco Pirroni.

Side A
No.	Title	Length
1.	"Dog Eat Dog"	3:11
2.	"Antmusic"	3:37
3.	"Feed Me to the Lions"	3:03
4.	"Los Rancheros"	3:30
5.	"Ants Invasion"	3:19
6.	"Killer in the Home"	4:22

Side B
No.	Title	Length
1.	"Kings of the Wild Frontier"	3:56
2.	"The Magnificent Five"	3:07
3.	"Don't Be Square (Be There)"	3:32
4.	"Jolly Roger"	2:11
5.	"Making History"	2:59
6.	"The Human Beings"	4:32

2004 reissue bonus tracks
No.	Title	Length
13.	"Antmusic" (Alternative Mix)	3:43
14.	"Antmusic" (Demo)	3:28
15.	"Feed Me to the Lions" (Demo)	3:02
16.	"The Human Beings" (Demo)	2:30
17.	"S.E.X." (Demo)	3:57
18.	"Omelette from Outerspace" (Demo)	3:06

=== US version ===
Side A
No.	Title	Writer(s)	Length
1.	"Dog Eat Dog"		3:07
2.	"Antmusic"		3:36
3.	"Los Rancheros"		3:28
4.	"Feed Me to the Lions"		2:59
5.	"Press Darlings"	Ant	4:12
6.	"Ants Invasion"		3:20
7.	"Killer in the Home"		4:19

Side B
No.	Title	Writer(s)	Length
1.	"Kings of the Wild Frontier"		3:53
2.	"The Magnificent Five"		3:05
3.	"Don't Be Square (Be There)"		3:29
4.	"Jolly Roger"		2:09
5.	"Physical (You're So)"	Ant	4:26
6.	"The Human Beings"		4:24

Bonus 7 inch single
No.	Title	Writer(s)	Length
1.	"Stand and Deliver"		3:06
2.	"Beat My Guest"	Ant	3:12

=== US Cassette version ===
Side A
No.	Title	Writer(s)	Length
1.	"Dog Eat Dog"		3:07
2.	"Jolly Roger"		2:09
3.	"Los Rancheros"		3:28
4.	"Feed Me to the Lions"		2:59
5.	"Press Darlings"	Ant	4:12
6.	"Ants Invasion"		3:20
7.	"Killer in the Home"		4:19
8.	"Beat My Guest"	Ant	3:12

Side B
No.	Title	Writer(s)	Length
1.	"Kings of the Wild Frontier"		3:53
2.	"The Magnificent Five"		3:05
3.	"Don't Be Square (Be There)"		3:29
4.	"Antmusic"		3:36
5.	"Physical (You're So)"	Ant	4:26
6.	"The Human Beings"		4:24
7.	"Stand and Deliver"		3:06

== Super Deluxe Edition ==
On 20 May 2016, Sony Music/Legacy Recordings issued a lavish four disc super deluxe box set of Kings of the Wild Frontier. The box included two CDs, a DVD & a 180g gold newly remastered vinyl LP.

Disc one
No.	Title	Length
1.	"Dog Eat Dog"	3.09
2.	"Antmusic"	3.36
3.	"Feed Me to the Lions"	3.01
4.	"Los Rancheros"	3.29
5.	"Ants Invasion"	3.20
6.	"Killer in the Home"	4.21
7.	"Kings of the Wild Frontier"	3.55
8.	"The Magnificent Five"	3.06
9.	"Don’t Be Square (Be There)"	3.31
10.	"Jolly Roger"	2.09
11.	"Making History"	2.57
12.	"The Human Beings"	4.31
13.	"Press Darlings"	4.11
14.	"Physical (You’re So)"	4.26
15.	"Fall In"	2.08
16.	"Don’t Be Square (Be There)" (KPM Studio Demo)	4.23
17.	"The Human Beings" (KPM Studio Demo)	4.56
18.	"Los Rancheros" (KPM Studio Demo)	3.33
19.	"Making History" (KPM Studio Demo)	3.44

Disc two - Adam & The Ants Live in Chicago, 1981
No.	Title	Length
1.	"The Human Beings"	3.35
2.	"Dog Eat Dog"	3.14
3.	"The Magnificent Five"	3.03
4.	"Don’t Be Square (Be There)"	3.20
5.	"Los Rancheros"	3.33
6.	"Ants Invasion"	3.12
7.	"Killer in the Home"	4.15
8.	"Cleopatra"	2.54
9.	"Press Darlings"	3.47
10.	"Kick!"	1.55
11.	"Antmusic"	3.14
12.	"Beat My Guest"	3.04
13.	"Jolly Roger"	2.11
14.	"Zerox"	3.11
15.	"Cartrouble"	3.21
16.	"Kings of the Wild Frontier"	4.33
17.	"Physical (You’re So)"	5.22
18.	"A.N.T.S."	3.30
19.	"Antmusic" (Rough Cut)	3.24
20.	"Don’t Be Square Be There" (Rough Cut)	3.52

All tracks mastered by Adam Ant & Walter Coelho. Tracks 1–17 previously unissued on CD. Tracks 19 & 20 previously unreleased.

=== DVD ===
The Videos
No.	Title	Length
1.	"Kings of the Wild Frontier"
2.	"Dog Eat Dog"
3.	"Antmusic"
4.	"Physical (You’re So)" (Live in Manchester)
5.	"Dog Eat Dog" (Live)

Adam & The Ants at the BBC
No.	Title	Length
6.	"Dog Eat Dog" (Top of the Pops, 16 October 1980)
7.	"Ants Invasion" (Old Grey Whistle Test, January 1981)
8.	"Killer in the Home" (Old Grey Whistle Test, January 1981)
9.	"Antmusic" (Top of the Pops, December 1980)
10.	"Dog Eat Dog" (Top of the Pops, 30 October 1980)

Adam & The Ants Live in Tokyo 1981
No.	Title	Length
11.	"The Magnificent Five"
12.	"Antmusic"
13.	"Don’t Be Square (Be There)"
14.	"Ants Invasion"
15.	"Killer in the Home"
16.	"Never Trust a Man (With Egg on His Face)"
17.	"Kick!"
18.	"Press Darlings"
19.	"Christian D’or"
20.	"Los Rancheros"
21.	"Cartrouble"
22.	"Dog Eat Dog"
23.	"Kings of the Wild Frontier"
24.	"Physical (You’re So)"
25.	"ANT INVASION: a documentary of the first Adam & the Ants US tour 1981"

=== 180g gold remastered vinyl LP ===
Side A
No.	Title	Length
1.	"Dog Eat Dog"	3.09
2.	"Antmusic"	3.36
3.	"Feed Me to the Lions"	3.01
4.	"Los Rancheros"	3.29
5.	"Ants Invasion"	3.20
6.	"Killer in the Home"	4.21

Side B
No.	Title	Length
1.	"Kings of the Wild Frontier"	3.55
2.	"The Magnificent Five"	3.06
3.	"Don’t Be Square (Be There)"	3.31
4.	"Jolly Roger"	2.09
5.	"Making History"	2.57
6.	"The Human Beings"	4.31

== Personnel ==
Adam and the Ants

- Adam Ant – vocals, acoustic guitar, piano, harmonica
- Marco Pirroni – electric guitar
- Kevin Mooney – bass
- Merrick (Chris Hughes) – drums, production
- Terry Lee Miall – drums
- Peter Ashworth – sleeve photography

== Chart positions ==
=== Weekly charts ===
Chart (1980–81)	Peak position
Australian Albums (Kent Music Report)	2
Austrian Albums (Ö3 Austria)	18
Canada Top Albums/CDs (RPM)	21
Dutch Albums (Album Top 100)	11
German Albums (Offizielle Top 100)	11
Japanese Albums (Oricon Albums Chart)	72
New Zealand Albums (RMNZ)	7
Swedish Albums (Sverigetopplistan)	4
UK Albums (Official Charts)	1
US Billboard 200	44
US Cash Box Top 200	47

=== Year-end charts ===
Chart (1981)	Position
New Zealand Albums (RMNZ)	33

== Certifications ==
Certifications for Kings of the Wild Frontier
Region	Certification	Certified units/sales
United Kingdom (BPI)	Platinum	300,000^{^}
United States (RIAA)	Gold	500,000^{^}
^{^} Shipments figures based on certification alone.
