= Do It Records =

British record label

- Founded: 1978
- Founder: Robin Scott; Max Tregoning; Ian Tregoning
- Defunct: 1983
- Status: Defunct
- Genre: Various
- Country of origin: United Kingdom

Do It Records was a British independent record label based in London, England. It was an early label of Adam and the Ants, releasing their debut studio album Dirk Wears White Sox in November 1979 (which in January 1980 was the first ever number one on the UK Independent Albums Chart and in February 1981 became a UK Top 20 album) as well as singles "Zerox" in June 1979 and "Cartrouble" in March 1980, the latter being not only a number one on the UK Independent Singles Chart but also the first collaboration between Adam Ant and Marco Pirroni, following the departure of the original Ants to form Bow Wow Wow.

The company was founded in 1978 by Robin Scott, Max Tregoning and Ian Tregoning. Over the next six years, it released several recordings by M, Adam and the Ants, Anthony Moore, Renaldo and the Loaf, the Mothmen and Yello, among others. After the label closed in 1983, the rights to its entire back catalogue were bought out by CBS, Adam Ant's then label, to secure permanent control of the Ants' recording history with Do It. The back catalogue is now owned by Sony Music Entertainment, which bought out CBS in 1987.

== New Zealand 'Do It Records' ==
Later, a separate company unrelated to the British original and known as Do It Records or Do It Management (stylised as DO IT) was established in New Zealand by Paul Marshall. This more recent company had a distribution relationship with Sony Records, via Sony subsidiary The Orchard. In 2026 it was accused by two artists of not paying royalties.

== See also ==
- Lists of record labels
