= Chris Hughes (musician) =

English musician and record producer (born 1954)

- Born: Christopher Merrick Hughes; 3 March 1954 (age 72); London, England
- Occupations: Record producer; songwriter; drummer
- Instrument: Drums
- Years active: 1980–present
- Formerly of: The Blitz Brothers

Christopher Merrick Hughes (born 3 March 1954), also known as Merrick, is a British record producer, songwriter, and drummer. He produced Tears for Fears' Songs from the Big Chair (1985), and was the co-writer of "Everybody Wants to Rule the World". His career began with Adam and the Ants as drummer and producer of the "Cartrouble" and "Kings of the Wild Frontier" singles, then their second studio album Kings of the Wild Frontier (1980). Yielding three hit singles, the album earned Hughes Music Week's 'Producer of the Year Award'.

== Life and career ==
Hughes was educated at Emanuel School in London. He was a member of Adam and the Ants, also producing their studio albums, Kings of the Wild Frontier (1980) and Prince Charming (1981). Hughes was awarded Music Week’s "Producer of the Year" award for his work on the album, Kings of the Wild Frontier. Hughes remained with Ant for the UK single version of Ant's solo debut "Goody Two Shoes" (the song was subsequently rerecorded without him for the Friend or Foe parent album and the 1983 US single release). He co-wrote Tears for Fears' hit song "Everybody Wants to Rule the World", and produced their first two studio albums, the platinum-selling The Hurting (1983) and the multi-platinum Songs from the Big Chair (1985). He began working with the band again on their third studio album, The Seeds of Love (1989), but left the project due to creative differences. Hughes also produced the Electric Soft Parade's debut studio album, Holes in the Wall (2002), which was nominated for the Mercury Prize, and Propaganda's 1234 (1990). Hughes also produced Dalek I Love You's debut studio album Compass Kumpas (1980), and programmed the drum machine on Peter Gabriel's "Red Rain".

In February 1994, Hughes released Shift, his debut solo studio album, which was re-released in July 2008. Shift was a tribute to the American minimal composer, Steve Reich. In 1972, Hughes' father took him to London to see Reich's performance of Drumming. Hughes credits Reich as a driving influence in his career. Shift uses fragments of Reich's work and "subjects it to subtle manipulations using the technology of recorded sound".

At db records, Hughes worked on the early development of Tom McRae and the Electric Soft Parade, producing debut albums that were both nominated for a Mercury Prize.

Hughes has worked with: Adam and the Ants, Def Leppard, Tears for Fears, Led Zeppelin's Robert Plant, Paul McCartney, Peter Gabriel, the Cars' Ric Ocasek, Wang Chung, Tom McRae, the Electric Soft Parade, Propaganda, Howard Jones, Lloyd Cole, Jon Bon Jovi, Tori Amos, Enya (Eithne Ní Bhraonáin), Moya Brennan (Máire Ní Bhraonáin) the voice of Clannad, Crybaby, Stackridge, the Teardrop Explodes and Sam Brookes.

His second solo studio album Eirenic Life was released on Helium Records on 14 July 2017.

Preceded by Jon Moss	Adam and the Ants drummer 1980–1982; With: Terry Lee Miall	Succeeded by Bogdan Wiczling & Barry Watta
