= Adam Ant discography =

- Studio albums: 11
- Extended plays: 3
- Live albums: 3
- Compilation albums: 13
- Singles: 25
- Video albums: 9
- Music videos: 26
- Box sets: 4

Adam Ant is a British post-punk, new wave artist. He was the lead singer of Adam & the Ants until their split in early 1982, by which time they had recorded three studio albums. Ant, however, would go solo, and release an additional five studio albums throughout the 1980s and early 1990s (one other album recorded during this period remains unreleased but circulates widely as a bootleg). After a gap of nearly 18 years, his sixth released solo studio album came out in early 2013. A planned follow-up album recorded the following year currently officially remains at developmental stage.

His greatest success on the UK Albums Chart was Adam & the Ants' 1980 release Kings of the Wild Frontier which was number one for a total of twelve weeks. However, it was the follow-up album, Prince Charming, that produced the biggest hit singles with "Stand and Deliver" and the title track, achieving five weeks and four weeks respectively as number one singles on the UK Singles Chart.

In the United States, Ant's biggest chart success was his solo debut, 1982's Friend or Foe album, which reached the Top 20 on the Billboard 200 the following spring. Three other Ant albums have reached the middle area of the Top 100. Friend or Foe also included the hit single "Goody Two Shoes", which was a Top 20 hit on the Billboard Hot 100 at the same time as the album, as well as a third number one single for Ant on the UK Singles Chart. Ant achieved further US singles chart success in the 1990s with "Room at the Top", a second Top 20 hit in 1990, and the "Wonderful" title track, a third Top 40 hit in 1995. Friend or Foe achieved US Gold Disc status within a year of its release; Kings of the Wild Frontier crawled to the same certification after nearly 14 years.

Besides regular studio albums there are a number of live albums, box sets and compilations. The three Peel Sessions first appeared in 1990 (minus two tracks from the first session), while the complete integral one collection appeared in 2001.

== Albums ==
=== Studio albums ===
Title	Album details	Peak chart positions										Certifications
Title	Album details	UK	UK Indie	AUS	AUT	CAN	GER	NL	NZ	SWE	US	Certifications
As Adam & the Ants
Dirk Wears White Sox	Released: 30 November 1979; Label: Do It; Formats: LP, MC	16 (Note: This position was reached in February 1981, 15 months after release, essentially on the strength of the commercial success of the next album.)	1	—	—	—	—	—	—	—	—	UK: Gold
Kings of the Wild Frontier	Released: 7 November 1980; Label: CBS; Formats: LP, MC	1	—	2	18	21	11	11	7	4	44	AUS: 2× Platinum; UK: Platinum; US: Gold
Prince Charming	Released: 6 November 1981; Label: CBS; Formats: LP, MC, 8-track	2	—	7	—	45	21	5	43	29	94	AUS: 2× Platinum; UK: Platinum
As Adam Ant
Friend or Foe	Released: 11 October 1982; Label: CBS; Formats: LP, MC, 8-track	5	—	60	—	14	55	33	—	36	16	UK: Gold; US: Gold
Strip	Released: 7 November 1983; Label: CBS; Formats: LP, MC, 8-track	20	—	—	—	84	—	44	—	—	65	UK: Silver
Vive Le Rock	Released: 2 September 1985; Label: CBS; Formats: CD, LP, MC	42	—	—	—	—	—	—	—	—	131	
Manners & Physique	Released: 12 March 1990; Label: MCA; Formats: CD, LP, MC	19	—	138	—	76	—	—	—	—	57	
Persuasion	Released: Unreleased (Note: Was planned for release in 1992/1993; however bootlegs do exist.); Label: MCA; Formats: N/A	—	—	—	—	—	—	—	—	—	—	
Wonderful	Released: 7 March 1995; Label: EMI; Formats: CD, MC	24	—	—	—	—	—	—	—	—	143	
Adam Ant Is the Blueblack Hussar in Marrying the Gunner's Daughter	Released: 21 January 2013; Label: Blueblack Hussar; Formats: CD, 2xLP, digital download	25	3	—	—	—	—	—	—	—	—	
Bravest of the Brave	Released: 2026 or later; Label: Blueblack Hussar; Formats: N/A	—	—	—	—	—	—	—	—	—	—	
"—" denotes releases that did not chart or were not released in that territory.

=== Live albums ===
Title	Album details
Live	Released: 1994; Artist credit: Adam Ant; Recording date: 21 February 1993; Recording location: Burbank Sound Stage, Los Angeles, California; Label: Arcade; Formats: CD; Bonus disc with 1994 pressing of Antmusic: The Very Best of Adam Ant
Live at The Bloomsbury	Released: 12 December 2008; Artist credit: Adam Ant; Recording date: 24 September 2007; Recording location: Bloomsbury Theatre, London, England; Label: Essential Works Limited; Formats: CD; Limited release
Kings of the Wild Frontier Disc Two	Released: 20 May 2016; Artist credit: Adam and the Ants; Recording date 16 April 1981; Recording location: Park West Club, Chicago, Illinois; Label: Sony Music; Formats: CD; Bonus disc with 2016 reissue of Kings of the Wild Frontier
Tokyo	Released: 1 July 2026; Artist credit: Adam and the Ants; Recording date 8 October 1981; Recording location: Nakano Sun Plaza, Tokyo, Japan; Label: Juno Records; Formats: CD

=== Compilation albums ===
Title	Album details	Peak chart positions	Certifications
Title	Album details	UK	Certifications
Hits	Released: September 1986; Label: CBS; Formats: LP, MC	—	UK: Gold
Antics in the Forbidden Zone	Released: 23 October 1990; Label: Epic; Formats: LP, MC	—	
Peel Sessions	Released: November 1990; Label: Strange Fruit; Formats: LP, MC	—	
Antmusic: The Very Best of Adam Ant	Released: August 1993; Label: Arcade; Formats: CD, MC	6	
B-Side Babies	Released: 27 September 1994; Label: Epic/Legacy; Formats: CD	—	
Super Hits	Released: 27 January 1998; Label: Epic/Legacy; Formats: CD, MC	—	
The Very Best of Adam and the Ants	Released: 5 April 1999; Label: Columbia; Formats: CD, MD	33	UK: Gold
The Complete Radio 1 Sessions	Released: 9 July 2001; Label: Strange Fruit; Formats: CD, MC	—	
The Essential Adam Ant	Released: 1 April 2003; Label: Epic/Legacy; Formats: CD	—	
Redux	Released: 11 April 2005; Label: Epic; Formats: CD	—	
Stand and Deliver: The Very Best of Adam & the Ants	Released: 26 September 2006; Label: Columbia; Formats: CD	39	UK: Gold
Dandy Highwaymen: The Best Of	Released: 26 November 2007; Label: Music Club; Formats: 2xCD	—	
Playlist: The Very Best of Adam Ant	Released: 9 October 2012; Label: Epic/Legacy; Formats: CD	—	
The Singles	Released: 30 October 2025; Label: Sony; Formats: CD	—	
"—" denotes releases that did not chart.

=== Box sets ===
Title	Album details	Peak chart positions
Title	Album details	UK
Antbox	Released: 4 December 2000; Label: Columbia; Formats: 3xCD	—
Adam Ant Remastered	Released: 11 April 2005; Label: Columbia; Formats: 4xCD; Limited collector's edition; A 7xCD version was released in 2006	188
Original Album Classics	Released: 26 September 2011; Label: Sony Music/Columbia; Formats: 3xCD	—
Kings of the Wild Frontier Super Deluxe Edition	Released: 20 May 2016; Label: Sony Music/Legacy; Formats: 2xCD+DVD+LP; Limited collector's edition	—
"—" denotes releases that did not chart.

== EPs ==
Title	Album details	Peak chart positions
Title	Album details	UK
The B-Sides	Released: 5 March 1982; Label: Do It; Formats: 7", 12"	46
Four Play Volume Twelve	Released: March 1988; Label: CBS; Formats: 7", CD; Australia-only release	—
Save the Gorilla	Released: November 2003; Label: NV; Formats: CD; Withdrawn – blocked by EMI Music Publishing (a small number of copies were dispatched to purchasers)	—
"—" denotes releases that did not chart or were not released in that territory.

== Singles ==
Title	Year	Peak chart positions										Certifications	Album
Title	Year	UK	AUS	BEL (FL)	CAN	GER	IRE	NL	NZ	US	US Dance	Certifications	Album
As Adam & the Ants
"Young Parisians"	1978	—	—	—	—	—	—	—	—	—	—		Non-album singles
"Zerox"	1979	— (Note: "Zerox" and "Cartrouble" did not enter the UK Singles Chart when originally released, but both did top the UK Independent Singles Chart - the latter immediately on release, the former in July 1980 following the emergence of 2000 "mispressed" copies with "Physical" on the B-side in place of "Whip In My Valise".)	—	—	—	—	—	—	—	—	—		Non-album singles
"Cartrouble" (re-recording (Note: "Cartrouble" the single is a re-recorded version of Part 2 of the track "Cartrouble Parts 1 & 2" which featured on Dirk Wears White Sox. The single featured also different personnel including new band member Marco Pirroni and session drummer Jon Moss (later of Culture Club). Nonetheless, it was recorded and released while Dirk Wears White Sox was the current album, and to fulfil the same contract with Do It Records as under which the album was released. As such, it qualifies as a single from Dirk Wears White Sox.))	1980	—	—	—	—	—	—	—	—	—	—		Dirk Wears White Sox (contains original recording)
"Kings of the Wild Frontier"	1980	48	—	—	—	—	—	—	—	—	19		Kings of the Wild Frontier
"Dog Eat Dog"	1980	4	22	—	—	—	16	—	31	—	19	UK: Silver	Kings of the Wild Frontier
"Antmusic"	1980	2	1	30	—	—	4	41	6	—	19	AUS: Platinum; UK: Gold	Kings of the Wild Frontier
"Young Parisians" (re-release)	1980	9	—	—	—	—	19	—	—	—	—	UK: Silver	Non-album singles
"Zerox" (re-release)	1981	45	—	—	—	—	—	—	—	—	—		Non-album singles
"Cartrouble" (re-release)	1981	33	—	—	—	—	—	—	—	—	—		Dirk Wears White Sox (contains original recording)
"Kings of the Wild Frontier" (re-release)	1981	2	—	—	—	—	5	—	—	—	—		Kings of the Wild Frontier
"Stand and Deliver"	1981	1	12	7	—	8	2	4	32	—	38	UK: Gold	Prince Charming
"Prince Charming"	1981	1	4	8	—	10	1	8	—	—	—	UK: Gold	Prince Charming
"Ant Rap"	1981	3	43	—	—	40	4	—	—	—	—	UK: Gold	Prince Charming
"Deutscher Girls"	1982	13	—	—	—	66	14	—	—	—	—		Jubilee soundtrack
As Adam Ant
"Goody Two Shoes" (Note: Some UK copies of the single "Goody Two Shoes" were credited to Adam and the Ants although it was intended as the first Adam Ant solo release (with Marco Pirroni as co-songwriter and guitarist and Chris 'Merrick' Hughes as drummer and producer). The album version of the song is a different mix from the single, which was released months before the album and not long after Adam and the Ants had split up, thus causing some UK copies to be credited under the old bandname. The US edition of the single featured the album version and hit its chart peak in early 1983, nearly a year after the UK.)	1982	1	1	16	4	5	2	13	29	12	—	UK: Silver	Friend or Foe
"Friend or Foe"	1982	9	49	—	—	31	3	19	—	—	—		Friend or Foe
"Desperate But Not Serious"	1982	33	—	—	—	—	18	—	—	66	—		Friend or Foe
"Puss 'n Boots"	1983	5	84	26	—	67	5	22	—	—	—	UK: Silver	Strip
"Strip"	1983	41	—	—	—	—	—	—	—	42	—		Strip
"Apollo 9"	1984	13	—	—	—	—	10	—	—	—	—		Vive Le Rock
"Vive Le Rock"	1985	50	—	—	—	—	—	—	—	—	29		Vive Le Rock
"Out of Bounds" (with Stewart Copeland; US-only release)	1986	—	—	—	—	—	—	—	—	—	—		Out of Bounds soundtrack
"Room at the Top"	1990	13	116	—	30	—	21	—	—	17	3		Manners & Physique
"Rough Stuff"	1990	—	160	—	—	—	—	—	—	—	14		Manners & Physique
"Can't Set Rules About Love"	1990	47	—	—	—	—	—	—	—	—	—		Manners & Physique
"Wonderful"	1995	32	—	—	9	—	—	—	—	39	—		Wonderful
"Beautiful Dream" (withdrawn & promo-only release)	1995	—	—	—	—	—	—	—	—	—	—		Wonderful
"Gotta Be a Sin"	1995	48	—	—	—	—	—	—	—	—	—		Wonderful
"Cool Zombie"	2012	154	—	—	—	—	—	—	—	—	—		Adam Ant Is the Blueblack Hussar in Marrying the Gunner's Daughter
"—" denotes releases that did not chart or were not released in that territory.

== Videos ==
=== Video albums ===
Title	Album details	Peak chart positions	
Title	Album details	UK	US
King of the Wild Frontier – Live in Japan	Released: 1981; Label: Home Video Productions; Formats: VHS, Betamax	—	—
The Prince Charming Revue	Released: 1982; Label: CBS Video; Formats: VHS, Betamax	—	—
Hits	Released: September 1986; Label: CBS Fox Video; Formats: VHS	4	—
Antics in the Forbidden Zone	Released: 23 October 1990; Label: CMV Enterprises; Formats: VHS, LaserDisc; US-only release	—	24
Antmusic: The Very Best of Adam Ant	Released: August 1993; Label: Arcade; Formats: VHS	1	—
Antvideo	Released: 4 December 2000; Label: SMV Enterprises; Formats: VHS	—	—
Stand and Deliver: The Very Best of Adam & the Ants (Note: Salvaged from cancelled DVD project Digital Tenderness minus most of the previously unreleased 1977-1980 footage originally planned for inclusion. A test pressing of the original planned release was subsequently leaked to YouTube and physical disc bootleg.)	Released: 11 December 2006; Label: Sony BMG; Formats: 2xDVD	46	—
The Blueblack Hussar	Released: 7 July 2014; Label: Sunrise Pictures; Formats: DVD, Blu-ray	2	—
Dirk Live at the Apollo	Released: April 2015; Label: BlueBlack Hussar; Formats: DVD	—	—
"—" denotes releases that did not chart or were not released in that territory.

=== Music videos ===
Title	Year	Director
"Plastic Surgery" (Note: Support video footage for the Derek Jarman film Jubilee of the Ants (including Kenny Morris guesting on drums) performing in an empty studio. This video was used in the film as a television screen image in a scene of Ant's character Kid watching himself and his band on TV performing on Top of the Pops. Although Jarman directed the film, he was not present for this video shoot. This footage should not be confused with the performance of this song filmed at Drury Lane Theatre and featured elsewhere in the film to represent Kid's audition for media mogul character Borgia Ginz.)	1977	unknown
"Tabletalk" (Note: This video and "Cartrouble pt2" were demonstration videos made as audition footage for Malcolm McLaren and were filmed in Richardson's back garden.)	1979	Stephanie Gluck/Clive Richardson
"Cartrouble pt2"	1979	Stephanie Gluck/Clive Richardson
"Zerox" (Note: Surviving footage from "video film" project "Xerox Machine" filmed at the studio of artist Laurie-Rae Chamberlain. There is one complete take of Ant performing the song in front of a set of neon lights plus short takes of Ant singing the outro while sat in a dentist's chair and a slideshow of "Xerography" still images created by Chamberlain of this and other video footage from the session. "Xerography" includes images of other takes of the song, including one performed in front of a stack of art equipment illuminated by disco lights.)	1979	Stephanie Gluck/Clive Richardson
"Kings of the Wild Frontier" (Note: Stills from this video (and alternative takes, of which at least one survives) were used for the sleeve art for the Kings of the Wild Frontier album and "Dog Eat Dog" single.)	1980	Stephanie Gluck/Clive Richardson
"Dog Eat Dog" (Note: Alternative take of performance of the song on 16 October 1980 edition of Top of the Pops. This has represented the song on video compilations since Antmusic – The Very Best of Adam Ant in 1993)	1980	(Top of the Pops outtake licensed to CBS)
"Antmusic"	1980	Steve Barron/Daniel Kleinman
"Dog Eat Dog"/"Kings of the Wild Frontier"/"Physical (You're So)" (live in Manchester) (Note: Concert footage from Manchester Apollo, 16 December 1980. Footage of "Dog Eat Dog" represented that single on the 1986 Hits video compilation. Footage of "Physical (You're So)" has represented The Antmusic EP on video compilations since Antmusic - The Very Best of Adam Ant in 1993)	1980	Steve Barron
"Stand and Deliver"	1981	Mike Mansfield/Adam Ant
"Prince Charming"	1981	Mike Mansfield/Adam Ant
"Ant Rap"	1981	Mike Mansfield/Adam Ant
"Goody Two Shoes"	1982	Mike Mansfield/Adam Ant
"Friend or Foe" (Note: Although made in the same general style as the Ant/Mansfield collaborations of 1981–1983, this video was directed by Ant alone.)	1982	Adam Ant
"Desperate But Not Serious"	1982	Mike Mansfield/Adam Ant
"Puss 'n Boots"	1983	Mike Mansfield/Adam Ant
"Strip"	1983	Mike Mansfield/Adam Ant
"Apollo 9"	1984	Daniel Kleinman
"Vive Le Rock"	1985	Frances de Lea
"Room at the Top"	1990	Daniel Kleinman
"Rough Stuff"	1990	Daniel Kleinman
"Can't Set Rules About Love"	1990	Daniel Kleinman
"Wonderful"	1995	Tony Kunewalder
"Beautiful Dream"	1995	
"Gotta Be a Sin"	1995	
"Cool Zombie"	2012	Adam Ant/Adam Ross
