= Antmusic: The Very Best of Adam Ant =

Greatest hits album by Adam Ant
- Released: September 1993
- Genres: Punk rock; pop; new wave
- Length: 2:21:47
- Label: Arcade

Adam Ant chronology
| Persuasion (1991) | Antmusic: The Very Best of Adam Ant (1993) | B-Side Babies (1994) |

Professional ratings
Review scores
| Source | Rating |
|---|---|
| Music Week | 4/5 stars |
| NME | 7/10 |

Antmusic: The Very Best of Adam Ant is a greatest hits album by English musician Adam Ant that covers his early work with the band Adam and the Ants as well as his solo work. It was released in September 1993 by Arcade Records.

The original version of the album was a single-disc release featuring 22 tracks. It reached number six on the UK Albums Chart. The corresponding VHS, including all the music videos to the classic Ant/Ants hits, topped the UK music video chart. A new edition of the album was released in early 1994 with a second disc including a live concert recording.

In 1999, a similar greatest hits album was released by Columbia Records, titled The Very Best of Adam and the Ants. It contains the same 22 tracks as The Very Best of Adam Ant, other than "Physical (You're So)" which is replaced by the 1995 solo Adam Ant single "Wonderful". The track listing is also in a slightly different order to the original release. The 1999 release reached number 56 on the UK Albums Chart, then re-entered the chart in 2004 reaching a new peak of number 33.

== Original release/disc one of 2-CD set ==
The original release and the first disc of the 2-CD set covers all of the UK Singles Chart hits from Adam Ant's career (with and without the Ants) from 1980–1990, beginning with "Young Parisians" and the earliest Dirk Wears White Sox singles from Do It Records—which had been re-released once the Ants found fame and charted in the UK Top 40—and ending with the charting singles from his then most recent album, Manners & Physique—"Room at the Top" and "Can't Set Rules About Love".

== Disc two of 2-CD set ==
The second CD is a live recording of a private concert held on 21 February 1993 at a rehearsal studio in Burbank, Los Angeles. This show was a warm-up for a tour to attract A&R interest from potential new record labels for the then-forthcoming release of his planned album, Persuasion after MCA Records had dropped Ant the previous year. Eventually, Ant signed with Capitol Records, but Persuasion was ultimately shelved when MCA refused to hand over the masters, so Wonderful was recorded and released in 1995 instead.

Although Ant has released concert videos/DVDs, live bonus CD single tracks (on the 1995 single "Gotta Be a Sin") and a live CD of a 2007 reading of his biography including acoustic versions of some of his songs, this CD remains one of only two full length audio-only live albums of a concert with a full band that Ant has ever issued, along with the 2016 release of a 1981 concert included with the remastered Kings of the Wild Frontier album.

== Track listing ==
All tracks are written by Adam Ant and Marco Pirroni, except where noted.

The Very Best of Adam Ant (original release/disc one)
| No. | Title | Writer(s) | Producer(s) | Length |
|---|---|---|---|---|
| 1. | "Antmusic" (from the album Kings of the Wild Frontier) | | Chris Hughes | 3:47 |
| 2. | "Stand and Deliver" (from the album Prince Charming) | | Hughes | 3:07 |
| 3. | "Room at the Top" (from the album Manners & Physique) | Ant, Pirroni & André Cymone | Cymone | 4:09 |
| 4. | "Vive Le Rock" (from the album Vive Le Rock) | | Tony Visconti | 3:39 |
| 5. | "Apollo 9" (from the album Vive Le Rock) | | Visconti | 3:22 |
| 6. | "Zerox" (from the album Dirk Wears White Sox) | Ant | Ant | 3:45 |
| 7. | "Dog Eat Dog" (from the album Kings of the Wild Frontier) | | Hughes | 3:07 |
| 8. | "Cartrouble" (from the album Dirk Wears White Sox) | Ant | Hughes | 3:28 |
| 9. | "Friends" (B-side to 7" single "Ant Rap") | Ant | Ant & Pirroni | 3:33 |
| 10. | "Desperate But Not Serious" (from the album Friend or Foe) | | Ant & Pirroni | 3:54 |
| 11. | "Prince Charming" (from the album Prince Charming) | | Hughes | 3:16 |
| 12. | "Goody Two Shoes" (from the album Friend or Foe) | | Hughes | 3:19 |
| 13. | "Puss'n Boots" (from the album Strip) | | Phil Collins | 4:01 |
| 14. | "Friend or Foe" (from the album Friend or Foe) | | Ant & Pirroni | 3:23 |
| 15. | "Strip" (from the album Strip) | | Collins | 3:58 |
| 16. | "Physical (You're So)" (B-side to 7" single "Dog Eat Dog") | Ant | Hughes | 4:25 |
| 17. | "Kings of the Wild Frontier" (from the album Kings of the Wild Frontier) | | Hughes | 3:52 |
| 18. | "Deutscher Girls" (from the Original Motion Picture Soundtrack Jubilee) | Ant | Guy Ford | 2:28 |
| 19. | "Ant Rap" (from the album Prince Charming) | | Hughes | 3:39 |
| 20. | "Kick" (B-side to 7" single "Cartrouble") | Ant | Hughes | 2:05 |
| 21. | "Young Parisians" | Ant | Ant & Jo Julian | 2:59 |
| 22. | "Can't Set Rules About Love" (from the album Manners & Physique) | | Cymone | 4:00 |
| Total length: | | | | 77:43 |

All tracks are written by Adam Ant and Marco Pirroni, except where noted.

Live Burbank Stage LA 1993 (disc two)
| No. | Title | Writer(s) | Length |
|---|---|---|---|
| 1. | "Vive Le Rock" | | 3:43 |
| 2. | "Miss Thing" | | 2:52 |
| 3. | "Cartrouble" | Ant | 3:22 |
| 4. | "Never Trust a Man (With Egg on His Face)" | Ant | 3:06 |
| 5. | "Dog Eat Dog" | | 3:12 |
| 6. | "Killer in the Home" | | 4:08 |
| 7. | "Room at the Top" | Ant, Pirroni & Cymone | 3:52 |
| 8. | "Ants Invasion" | | 2:54 |
| 9. | "Desperate But Not Serious" | | 4:04 |
| 10. | "Young Dumb and Full of It" | | 3:33 |
| 11. | "Stand and Deliver" | | 2:54 |
| 12. | "Antmusic" | | 3:29 |
| 13. | "Goody Two Shoes" | | 3:12 |
| 14. | "20th Century Boy" (T. Rex cover) | Marc Bolan | 3:49 |
| 15. | "Red Scab" | Ant | 3:53 |
| 16. | "Shakin' All Over" (Johnny Kidd & the Pirates cover) | Johnny Kidd & Gus Robinson | 3:37 |
| 17. | "Fall In" | Ant & Lester Square | 2:19 |
| 18. | "Physical (You're So)" | Ant | 6:06 |
| Total length: | | | 64:04 |

VHS
| No. | Title | Length |
|---|---|---|
| 1. | "Antmusic" | 3:47 |
| 2. | "Stand and Deliver" | 3:07 |
| 3. | "Room at the Top" | 4:09 |
| 4. | "Prince Charming" | 3:16 |
| 5. | "Goody Two Shoes" | 3:19 |
| 6. | "Vive Le Rock" | 3:39 |
| 7. | "Apollo 9" | 3:22 |
| 8. | "Strip" | 3:58 |
| 9. | "Puss'n Boots" | 4:01 |
| 10. | "Desperate But Not Serious" | 3:54 |
| 11. | "Friend or Foe" | 3:23 |
| 12. | "Ant Rap" | 3:39 |
| 13. | "Dog Eat Dog" | 3:07 |
| 14. | "Kings of the Wild Frontier" | 3:52 |
| 15. | "Can't Set Rules About Love" | 4:00 |
| 16. | "Physical (You're So)" | 4:25 |
| 17. | "Rough Stuff" | 4:39 |
| Total length: | | 75:00 |
