= Redux (album) =

Compilation album by Adam Ant
- Released: 11 April 2005
- Genre: Rock, pop rock
- Length: 55:03
- Label: Epic

Adam Ant chronology
Wonderful (1995)	Redux (2005)	Adam Ant Is the Blueblack Hussar in Marrying the Gunner's Daughter (2013)

Professional ratings
Review scores
Source	Rating
AllMusic	4.5/5 stars

Redux a compilation album by Adam Ant. It is a 15-track bonus disc that only came with the Adam Ant Remastered limited edition collector's box set (5,000 copies) released 11 April 2005. It features previously unreleased demo versions of songs from his previous albums.

Along with Redux, Adam Ant Remastered came with remastered versions of Friend or Foe, Strip & Vive Le Rock, which also contained demos and outtakes from their respective albums. Most of the demos on Redux were from older Adam and the Ants albums, however, a few demos from his solo career appear on it as well.

The first four tracks are demos from 1980 for Adam and the Ants' breakthrough album, Kings of the Wild Frontier, recorded at KPM studio. "Prick Up Your Ears" (track one) is about 1960s English playwright and author Joe Orton and his mentor, lover and eventual murderer Kenneth Halliwell. By the time it became "The Magnificent Five," the lyrics became about Adam and the Ants.

Tracks five through eight are demos from 1981 from the Prince Charming, recording sessions at Windmill Lane Studios. Tracks nine through eleven are demos from Adam Ant's first solo album, Friend or Foe. "Seven Up" (track ten) is a previously unreleased instrumental. Tracks twelve through fourteen are Vive Le Rock demos. The final track is a cover of the title track to T. Rex's final album, "Dandy in the Underworld," recorded at John Reynolds' studio in Notting Hill.

== Track listing ==
All tracks are written by All songs written by Adam Ant & Marco Pirroni, except "Dandy in the Underworld," written by Marc Bolan.

Kings of the Wild Frontier Demos
No.	Title	Length
1.	"Prick Up Your Ears" (Demo Version of "Magnificent Five")	3:19
2.	"Jolly Roger"	3:07
3.	"Making History"	3:51
4.	"Don't Be Square (Be There)"	4:23

Prince Charming Demos
No.	Title	Length
5.	"Mowhok"	3:54
6.	"That Voodoo!"	4:00
7.	"Five Guns West"	3:44
8.	"Ups and Downs" (Demo Version of "Mile High Club")	3:46

Friend or Foe Demos
No.	Title	Length
9.	"Friend or Foe"	2:59
10.	"Seven Up" (Instrumental)	3:06
11.	"Desperate But Not Serious/Manzanera"	3:26

Vive Le Rock Demos
No.	Title	Length
12.	"Saigon"	3:41
13.	"Scorpio Rising"	3:43
14.	"Mohair Lockeroom Pin-Up Boys"	3:50

Previously unreleased T. Rex cover from 1995
No.	Title	Length
15.	"Dandy in the Underworld" (Demo)	4:14
Total length:		55:03
