= Antics in the Forbidden Zone =

Greatest hits album by Adam Ant
- Released: 23 October 1990
- Genre: New wave, post-punk
- Length: 73:42
- Label: CBS Epic Records
- Producer: Adam Ant, Phil Collins, Gregg Geller, Chris Hughes, Marco Pirroni, Tony Visconti

Adam Ant chronology
Manners & Physique (1990)	Antics in the Forbidden Zone (1990)	Persuasion (1992)

Antics in the Forbidden Zone is a Greatest Hits compilation and accompanying video by the English new wave musician Adam Ant, released 23 October 1990 by Epic Records. The collection spans the years 1979 to 1985, including Ant's time as frontman of Adam and the Ants with selections from Dirk Wears White Sox (1979), Kings of the Wild Frontier (1980), and Prince Charming (1981), as well as his first three solo albums, Friend or Foe (1982), Strip (1983) and Vive Le Rock (1985). The collection does not include "Ants Invasion", from which the title Antics in the Forbidden Zone was taken.

== Video ==
The video release, published by Sony Music Distribution, collects twelve music videos both from the band and from Ant's solo career. Missing are early videos prior to Adam and the Ant's signing to Epic ("Zerox," for example) and "Dog Eat Dog." In the case of "Dog Eat Dog," concert footage was used rather than the Top of the Pops performance from 16 October 1980 that had been licensed to CBS, and had been used as the official music video up to that point.

== Reception ==
Professional ratings
Review scores
Source	Rating
AllMusic	4.5/5 stars
The Rolling Stone Album Guide	4/5 stars

Chris Woodstra of AllMusic gave Antics in the Forbidden Zone four and a half stars out of five, praising it as "the most comprehensive overview of the band" and "an essential part of any new wave collection". He also remarked of the video release that "These groundbreaking videos, while primitive by today's standards, were as important to this band's success as was the music."

== Track listing ==
It includes all of the singles from these releases along with additional selections from each album. "Beat My Guest'", a song previously released as the B-side to "Stand and Deliver," makes its first appearance on CD. Though usually stylised as one word, "Car Trouble" is separated into two words on this collection.

All tracks are written by Adam Ant and Marco Pirroni, except where noted.

Album
No.	Title	Writer(s)	Producer	Length
1.	"Zerox" (from Dirk Wears White Sox, 1979)	Ant	Ant	3:45
2.	"Whip in My Valise" (from Dirk Wears White Sox, 1979)	Ant	Ant	3:57
3.	"Cartrouble" (from Dirk Wears White Sox, 1979)	Ant	Chris Hughes	3:24
4.	"Kick" (from Dirk Wears White Sox, 1979)	Ant	Hughes	2:06
5.	"Kings of the Wild Frontier" (from Kings of the Wild Frontier, 1980)		Hughes	3:53
6.	"Antmusic" (from Kings of the Wild Frontier, 1980)		Hughes	3:34
7.	"Dog Eat Dog" (from Kings of the Wild Frontier, 1980)		Hughes	3:06
8.	"Los Rancheros" (from Kings of the Wild Frontier, 1980)		Hughes	3:26
9.	"Killer in the Home" (from Kings of the Wild Frontier, 1980)		Hughes	4:18
10.	"Stand and Deliver" (from Prince Charming, 1981)		Hughes	3:33
11.	"Beat My Guest" (from "Stand and Deliver", 1981)	Ant	Hughes	3:10
12.	"Prince Charming" (from Prince Charming, 1981)		Hughes	3:16
13.	"Ant Rap" (from Prince Charming, 1981)		Hughes	3:23
14.	"Desperate But Not Serious" (from Friend or Foe, 1982)		Ant, Pirroni	4:12
15.	"Place in the Country" (from Friend or Foe, 1982)		Ant, Pirroni	2:50
16.	"Friend or Foe" (from Friend or Foe, 1982)		Ant, Pirroni	2:50
17.	"Goody Two Shoes" (from Friend or Foe, 1982)		Ant, Pirroni	3:22
18.	"Strip" (from Strip, 1983)		Phil Collins	3:58
19.	"Puss 'n Boots" (from Strip, 1983)		Collins	4:01
20.	"Apollo 9" (from Vive Le Rock, 1985)		Tony Visconti	3:20
21.	"Vive Le Rock" (from Vive Le Rock, 1985)		Visconti	3:39
Total length:				73:42

Video
No.	Title	Length
1.	"Kings of the Wild Frontier"	3:53
2.	"Dog Eat Dog"	3:06
3.	"Antmusic"	3:34
4.	"Stand and Deliver"	3:33
5.	"Prince Charming"	3:16
6.	"Ant Rap"	3:23
7.	"Goody Two-Shoes"	3:22
8.	"Friend or Foe"	2:50
9.	"Desperate But Not Serious"	4:12
10.	"Puss 'n Boots"	4:01
11.	"Strip"	3:58
12.	"Apollo 9"	3:20
13.	"Vive Le Rock"	3:39
Total length:		50:00

== Personnel ==
- Adam Ant – vocals, guitar, piano, harmonica, bass guitar
- Matthew Ashman – guitar, piano (tracks 1–4)
- Dave Barbarossa – percussion (tracks 1 & 2)
- Jon Moss - Drums (tracks 3 & 4)
- Andrew Warren – bass guitar (tracks 1–4)
- Marco Pirroni – guitar (tracks 5–21)
- Kevin Mooney – bass guitar (tracks 5–9)
- Chris Hughes – drums (tracks 3–13)
- Terry Lee Miall – drums (tracks 5–13)
- Gary Tibbs – bass guitar (tracks 10–13)
- Bogdan Wiczling – drums, percussion (tracks 14–17, 20 & 21)
- Martin Drover – trumpet, flugelhorn (tracks 14–17)
- Jeff Daly – saxophone (tracks 14–17)
- Phil Collins – drums (tracks 18 & 19)
- Anni-Frid Lyngstad – female vocals (track 18)
- Chris Constantinou – bass guitar, backing vocals (tracks 20 & 21)
