= B-Side Babies =

- The cover image for B-Side Babies comes from a 12" single of "Young Parisians", though neither "Young Parisians" nor its B-side, "Lady", appear on this collection.

Compilation album by Adam Ant
- Released: 27 September 1994
- Genre: New wave, post-punk
- Length: 57:14
- Label: CBS Epic Records
- Producer: Adam Ant, Richard James Burgess, Chris Hughes, Marco Pirroni, Tony Visconti

Adam Ant chronology
Antmusic: The Very Best of Adam Ant (1994)	B-Side Babies (1994)	Wonderful (1995)

Professional ratings
Review scores
Source	Rating
AllMusic	4/5 stars
The Rolling Stone Album Guide	3.5/5 stars

B-Side Babies is a compilation album by English new wave musician Adam Ant, released by Epic Records in 1994. It is not to be confused with The B-Sides, a 7-inch EP of "Friends" b/w "Kick"/"Physical", released by Do It Records in 1982.

Consisting primarily of single B-sides—both solo and with the Ants—the collection is described in the following manner on the back cover of the CD:

The album Adam Ant always wanted you to have! Call it 'Yours, Yours, Yours,' because that's exactly what he intended! A true gift of Antmusic as a special thank you to all the fans who have been eagerly awaiting a chance to listen to the B-sides and bonus tracks they've never had before! In addition to US-released B-sides, other goodies found here include 7 tracks never before released in the US and 1 extra special treat never before released anywhere! So put on your dancing shoes and be Adam Ant's 'B-Side Baby!'

Most of the tracks on this collection were fairly well known to Adam Ant fans, regardless of whether or not they owned any of the singles. "Beat My Guest" was the first song Adam and the Ants played at their debut gig at the ICA restaurant in May 1977. "Fall-In" is an old Ants song from 1977, co-written with Lester Square. "Red Scab", "Juanito the Bandito" and "B-Side Baby" also date back to 1977. "It Doesn't Matter" was performed at a John Peel session on 23 January 1978, and "Physical" and "Friends" were performed at a Peel session on 10 July 1978. "Christian D'or", originally called "Christian Dior", is also from 1978, as are "Why Do Girls Love Horses?" and "Greta X". The "extra special treat never before released anywhere" is a previously unreleased version of "It Doesn't Matter".

"Physical" was later covered by Nine Inch Nails, and appears as one of the two bonus songs on their 1992 EP Broken.

== Track listing ==
All tracks are written by Adam Ant, except where noted.

No.	Title	Writer(s)	Producer(s)	Length
1.	"Fall-In" (B-side to UK release of "Antmusic", 1980)	Ant, Lester Square	Chris Hughes	2:09
2.	"Making History" (From the UK version of the Kings of the Wild Frontier LP, 1980)		Hughes	2:57
3.	"Beat My Guest" (B-side to "Stand and Deliver", 1981. Also included on the compilation Antics in the Forbidden Zone, 1990.)		Hughes	3:11
4.	"Friends (Version 2)" (B-side to UK release of "Ant Rap", 1981 Also appears on the compilation Antmusic: The Very Best of Adam Ant, 1993.)		Hughes	3:32
5.	"Red Scab" (B-side to "Goody Two Shoes", 1982)		Hughes	4:08
6.	"Juanito the Bandito" (B-side to "Friend or Foe", 1982)		Ant, Marco Pirroni	4:27
7.	"Why Do Girls Love Horses?" (B-side to "Desperate But Not Serious", 1982)		Hughes	3:06
8.	"Yours, Yours, Yours" (B-side to "Strip", 1983)	Ant, Pirroni	Ant, Pirroni	3:07
9.	"Kiss the Drummer" (B-side to "Puss'n Boots", 1983)	Ant, Pirroni	Richard James Burgess, Ant, Pirroni	3:35
10.	"B-Side Baby" (B-side to "Apollo 9", 1985)		Tony Visconti	4:42
11.	"Greta-X" (B-side to "Vive Le Rock", 1985)	Ant, Pirroni	Visconti	3:18
12.	"Human Bondage Den" (Cassette only track from Vive Le Rock, 1985)	Ant, Pirroni	Visconti	3:09
13.	"Physical (You're So)" (B-side to UK release of "Dog Eat Dog", 1980. Also used for the US version of the Kings of the Wild Frontier LP, 1980, and the compilation Antmusic: The Very Best of Adam Ant, 1993.)		Hughes	4:28
14.	"It Doesn't Matter" (Previously unreleased, 1985)		Visconti	2:14
15.	"Christian D'Or" (B-side to UK release of "Prince Charming", 1981)		Hughes	4:15
16.	"Vive Le Rock (Instrumental Dub Mix)" (B-side to "Vive Le Rock" (12"), 1985)	Ant, Pirroni	Ant, Pirroni	5:11
Total length:				57:14
