= Persuasion (Adam Ant album) =

Studio album by Adam Ant
- Released: Unreleased
- Recorded: 1991
- Genre: Pop rock
- Length: 42:01
- Label: MCA Records
- Producer: Bernard Edwards

Adam Ant chronology
Antics in the Forbidden Zone (1990)	Persuasion (Unreleased)	Antmusic: The Very Best of Adam Ant (1993)

Persuasion was the planned fifth studio solo album by Adam Ant. Its release was planned for 1992–1993; this never happened, but it has surfaced as bootlegs, and nowadays circulates on file sharing networks. This album is one of the 20 written about in The Greatest Music Never Sold by Dan Leroy, a book that revealed information on the lost recordings of many famous musicians. Ant has also discussed the doomed production in his autobiography and it has been featured in the online edition of Classic Pop magazine.

== Production ==
The album featured a collaboration between the Ant/Marco Pirroni partnership and Bernard Edwards, longtime bass player with the disco group Chic. Edwards' Chic bandmate Tony Thompson played drums on most of the album, except for "Headgear", "Survival of the Fetish" and the title track, which all featured drummer Dave Ruffy, who had previously worked with Pirroni on work by Sinéad O'Connor. Also featured on the album were Cameo guitarist Larry Blackmon (on the track "Little Devil") and former Adam and the Ants bassist Leigh Gorman.

== Non-release and tour ==
Despite the US Top 20 success of the single "Room At The Top" from previous MCA album Manners & Physique, the label rejected the album and – reasoning that the previous album had failed to achieve gold status in the US - dropped Ant from its roster of artists.

Following the rejection of the album by MCA, Ant together with a new band including Pirroni and Ruffy, embarked on the 1993 Persuasion Tour to attract a new label for the album, including a three-night stand at the Henry Fonda Theatre in Los Angeles. Although Ant was able to sign to new label Capitol Records in the US and EMI in the UK, MCA proved unwilling to let go of the Persuasion master tapes. A new album, Wonderful, was recorded instead with the band from the tour.

== Legacy ==
Seventeen years later, onstage at the Scala on 30 April 2010, Ant recalled the events of the non-release of the album, and announced his intention to release it soon with artwork by Jamie Hewlett. A concert at the Electric Ballroom, tentatively scheduled for 12 August 2010 but which never materialised, was due to have featured songs from the album.

Interviewed in 2001, Marco Pirroni discussed Persuasion's non-release:

You'll have to ask MCA about that – they refused to admit that they even own it and then they refused to license it at any price! First of all, I did not sign the deal with MCA, so I am not too familiar with all the legal wranglings, but for some bizarre reason, basically they didn't like it at the time. The company itself was going through financial difficulties and changes. But the reasons why is best known to themselves. It sat on the shelf; we couldn't get it back. We tried to use some of the tracks from Persuasion, to put on the Antbox; they simply did not want to license them.

== Track listing ==
No.	Title	Length
1.	"Persuasion"	4:10
2.	"Headgear"	4:03
3.	"All Girl Action"	4:23
4.	"Brain Candy"	4:17
5.	"Obsession"	4:00
6.	"Little Devil"	3:48
7.	"Sexatise You"	4:04
8.	"Survival of the Fetish"	4:29
9.	"Charge of the Heavy Brigade"	4:37
10.	"Don't Knock It ('til you got it)"	4:10
Total length:		42:01

"Seems to Me" (4:34) appeared on bootleg copies in place of "Charge of the Heavy Brigade" but was not planned for inclusion on the main album.

Tracks 1, 2, 3 (occasionally) and 5 were played live on the Persuasion tour.
