= Room at the Top (Adam Ant song) =

Single by Adam Ant

from the album Manners & Physique
- B-side: "Bruce Lee"
- Released: 5 February 1990
- Recorded: 1989
- Genre: Dance-rock, new wave
- Length: 4:09 (Single Version) 4:43 (Album Version)
- Label: MCA
- Songwriters: Adam Ant, Marco Pirroni & André Cymone
- Producer: André Cymone

Adam Ant singles chronology
"Vive Le Rock" (1985)	"Room at the Top" (1990)	"Can't Set Rules About Love" (1990)

Music video
- "Room at the Top" on YouTube

"Room at the Top" is a song by Adam Ant, and the lead track on his fourth solo album, Manners & Physique. It was released as a single on 5 February 1990, a month prior to the album's release. It was Ant's second and final top 20 single in the US.

== Chart performance ==
After having spent most of the past five years working on his acting career, this was Ant's first single since "Vive Le Rock" in 1985. "Room at the Top" peaked at number seventeen on the Billboard Hot 100, making it his second biggest hit in the US behind "Goody Two Shoes". It was also a number three dance hit in America. It reached number thirteen on the UK Singles Chart.

== Credits ==
"Room at the Top" was written by Adam Ant, Marco Pirroni & Prince protégé André Cymone. Adam only provided vocals for the track, while Marco played guitar & bass guitar. Cymone produced the track, played keyboards & handled drum programming (or, as Manners & Physique's liner notes put it, "everything else"). "Room at the Top", was styled after the Minneapolis sound, as was most of the Manners & Physique album, of which (in Ant's words) Cymone was "one of the architects".

== "Bruce Lee" ==
The B-side to the single is called "Bruce Lee", an obvious homage to the late martial artist (Adam impersonates Bruce Lee in the "Ant Rap" music video). Both songs appear on both sides of the cassette single. When Manners & Physique was reissued on Cherry Red Records in 2009, "Bruce Lee" was one of five bonus tracks added. US remix, 7" edit of 12" and house vocal versions of "Room at the Top" were also added.

== Charts ==
Chart (1990)	Peak position
Ireland (IRMA)	21
Italy Airplay (Music & Media)	9
US Cash Box Top 100	18
