= Adam Ant Is the Blueblack Hussar in Marrying the Gunner's Daughter =

Studio album by Adam Ant
- Released: 21 January 2013
- Recorded: 2009–2012
- Genres: Rock, pop rock, post-punk
- Length: 68:53
- Label: Blueblack Hussar
- Producers: Adam Ant, Boz Boorer, Chris McCormac

Adam Ant chronology
Wonderful (1995)	Adam Ant Is the Blueblack Hussar in Marrying the Gunner's Daughter (2013)	Bravest of the Brave (tbc)

Singles from Adam Ant Is The Blueblack Hussar in Marrying The Gunner's Daughter
- 1. ""Cool Zombie"/ "Gun in Your Pocket"" Released: 21 October 2012

Adam Ant Is the Blueblack Hussar in Marrying the Gunner's Daughter is the sixth solo studio album by Adam Ant. The album's title was announced by Ant in the NME in April 2010. As he had announced at his gig in Chatham in September 2012, the new album was released on 21 January 2013 by Ant's own record label, Blueblack Hussar Records. Despite the independent self-release, the album reached number 25 on the UK Albums Chart, only one place lower than its predecessor, Wonderful, released on the major EMI label nearly eighteen years earlier. It had previously been at number 8 in the midweek chart update.

== Background and development ==
Adam Ant started working on the album in August 2009. Most of the double album was recorded with Boz Boorer on a laptop computer. The former 3 Colours Red guitarist, Chris McCormack, co-wrote six tracks for the album, four of which appeared on the finished product. Originally Ant was due to have been recording with his writing partner Marco Pirroni but they separated and scrapped all work around March 2010, coinciding with Ant's return to live performance. Despite this, Ant utilised five tracks from one recording session just before the split, all rerecordings of songs from the 1997 "Blend Demos" session with Pirroni. Four of these made the final track list - the songs "Sausage" (originally titled "Call Me Sausage"), "Vivienne's Tears", "Hard Men, Tough Blokes" (originally titled "Tough Blokes") and "Punkyoungirl".

Ant explained that the idea behind the album's title was that the Blueblack Hussar was his classic Kings of the Wild Frontier-era persona, back from the dead, while the phrase "marrying the gunner's daughter" (an old naval term for a form of corporal punishment in which sailors were tied to a ship's cannon and flogged) was intended by Ant as a metaphor for how he believes artists are treated by the music industry.

The album first started to receive attention after NME reported that Ant was back in the studio in March 2010. In an April 2010 interview for the NME, Ant said that he was working on a new album, with the title Adam Ant Is the Blueblack Hussar in Marrying the Gunner's Daughter. This was planned to have collaborations with McCormack, Pirroni, a member of Oasis (later identified as Andy Bell) and Morrissey's writing partner Boz Boorer. Ant described the album at the time as a "live record that lends itself to performance" which would feature a "kind of concept. It's a very old fashioned, old school, step-by-step album".

In addition, Ant rerecorded a song in tribute to the Sex Pistols' late manager Malcolm McLaren, who had died earlier that month, and who also once managed Adam & The Ants. Named "Who's A Goofy Bunny Then?", the track was only previously available as a demo recorded in the early 1980s, although material from the song had been recycled in 1983 for "Libertine", a track on Ant's second solo album Strip, released that year. Despite this, Ant said he wanted to release a new version in tribute to McLaren. "Malcolm was a sort of mentor in my life," he explained. "As close as you can get to a surrogate father." The song, Ant explained, took its name from a term of endearment bestowed upon McLaren by Ant – referring to his "quite prominent teeth".

The track which Ant and McCormack were reported to have worked on with the Beady Eye member Andy Bell was titled "Cool Zombie". Bell, allegedly at the behest of Liam Gallagher, initially attempted to block its inclusion on the album. This led to a personalised war of words between Ant and Gallagher; consequently Bell denied he had been put under any pressure. "It was totally my decision not to allow the track to be used," he said, "And I'm annoyed at Liam being dragged into this situation which has nothing at all to do with him." Bell also gave further insight into the origins of the song, explaining that he and Ant have "a mutual friend who I had played around on a track with who then passed the music over to Adam without my knowledge. I then explained the track couldn't be used for his album (this was just a rough demo) and thought the matter was closed. Adam then mentioned in the press he had recorded with one of Oasis, but Liam Gallagher had banned the track from being used." Ant eventually rerecorded the song for the final release with two members of his live band, guitarist Tom Edwards and drummer Andy Woodard. The song became the first single from the album.

In early 2011, in preparation for a cover feature for issue 2 of Vive Le Rock magazine, Ant granted journalist John Robb an exclusive listen to the entire work-in-progress for the upcoming album. Robb reported in the feature that the songs written with McCormack were "tough, hard neo-industrial song that sound like the Physical-era Ants" while those written with Boorer were "really cool twangy rockers". "Gun in Your Pocket" was "a rocking neo-Stooges rush" and other songs were described as "slower almost ballad-like songs, and a brace of off the wall angular moments that hark back to the groundbreaking Ants of the debut Dirk Wears White Sox album".

In a 2012 interview, Ant's friend, the backing vocalist and songwriting partner Georgina Baillie, commented on the song "Gun in Your Pocket", reported to be a collaboration between Ant and herself. She confirmed that the track – which had previously been announced as an album track and single before eventually becoming the B-side to "Cool Zombie", and which concerned the Russell Brand Show prank telephone calls of which she had been an injured party – was a different song from "Rubber Medusa" (concerning Brand and mentioning his later partner Katy Perry) which she and her band the Poussez Posse had been performing live in support slots for Ant's tours. "The first one that Adam and I wrote was about an ex of mine – guess who! Which is not on the (Poussez Posse) album, which is called "Gun in Your Pocket". Adam actually wrote that before he met me at the Zodiac Mindwarp gig in April (sic) 2010. That night, he told me 'I have a song about you and your granddad,' and I was 'Oh my God! That's amazing' ... I didn’t see Adam for 4 to 5 months and then I bumped into him around where we both live and we were talking and then the writing started happening ... The first one Adam and I (subsequently) wrote together was "Rubber Medusa", which was about Russell. Adam came up with the title which is a quote from the Jubilee film – the person does look like a rubber Medusa so I see why he said it."

== Release and promotion ==
The album was released as a double album in January 2013 on CD and vinyl in a deluxe gatefold sleeve. Ant had previously expressed the intention to also release the album in the redundant cassette format. According to Ant, the front cover is "Girl in a Cocked Hat" and the back cover is "Girl in a Cocked Hat II", both of which are paintings by Mary Jane Ansell. Ant said that the girl depicted in the artwork was the gunner's daughter, her name is Georgie "and she’s a little punk rocker".

A 40-second clip of the proposed single "Hard Men, Tough Blokes" was released on Ant's official website on 16 August 2011.

The song "Vince Taylor" was also a regular addition to Ant's setlist on the second leg of his 2011 UK tour.

A video for the single "Cool Zombie" was filmed on 28 October, with NME running a competition offering readers a chance to be an extra in the shoot. Also cast as costumed extras in the video were several security staff, combining their performances with their normal duties following the unwanted attentions of a fan who had threatened to turn up on location. An on-set source noted how this dual role allowed the security officers to blend in and so be on set at all times. The source further wryly reported, "The guys said it was the first time they'd ever carried out protection work while dressed as Victorian dandies." A USB wristband containing an mp4 file of the "Cool Zombie" video was sold on Ant's official website.

== Critical reception ==
Professional ratings
Review scores
Source	Rating
AllMusic	4/5 stars
The Arts Desk	3/5 stars
The Guardian	3/5 stars
The Independent	3/5 stars
Louder Than War	8/10
NME	2/5 stars
The Observer	2/5 stars
Record Collector	3/5 stars

AllMusic gave the album strong praise, rating it four out of five stars. They concluded that the album's charm is "in its mess" and that Ant "has never sounded this ambitious and arty since the days of Dirk Wears White Socks [sic] and Kings of the Wild Frontier".

John Robb on the music website Louder Than War also gave the album strong praise saying, "It's rare at this stage of the game that anyone can be arsed to be as non-compromising as this let alone remember the creative power of following your own instinct." Robb also praised "the demo stage of the song(s)".

Longtime Ant fan (and "Cool Zombie" video extra) Simon Price praised the album in his review in The Independent, giving it four out of five stars. "What this album isn't is an attempt to recapture Ant's glory days: there's no Burundi double-drumming and no spaghetti-western guitar. The Ant album it reminds me of the most, in fact, is Dirk Wears White Sox: there's the same mid-fi production, and the same mix of perversion ... It's sprawling, overdue and not for everyone, but at least it's not a play-it-safe comeback with the hot producer of the day. And for that, the Hussar should be saluted."

Q magazine's David Quantick gave the album cautious praise, awarding it three out of five stars and describing it as "full of spit and vinaigrette. His ninth record is ramshackle and there's a lot of it, but it's always entertaining... everything is lively and bright-eyed, despite the demo-ish production."

The London Evening Standard reviewer, John Aizelwood, expressed similar sentiments and gave an identical three-star score. "At 68 minutes, it's a sprawling mess, a stream of consciousness featuring tributes to Malcolm McLaren, Vivienne Westwood and rocker Vince Taylor, and the percussive thrill of "Antmusic" on "Bullshit". Elsewhere, there are digs at Britain's mental health system on "Shrink", self-appointed hardmen and the music industry that spat him out. A diligent editor and better production would have meant a wayward masterpiece, but this is an absorbing, troubling, sometimes brilliant album."

A review in The Times was in the same vein and with the same score. Will Hodgkinson wrote, "In the early 1980s Adam Ant was the best pop star on the planet ... Some of that genius is in evidence on this comeback of sorts, but it comes as damaged goods, with a sense of frantic chaos rather than contained energy ... The problem is that all kind of good musical and lyrical themes come across as thrown together, rather than making coherent sense ... Still, there are some gems buried among the cartoonish, throwaway moments ... It's a scrappy, unfocused album, and too long at 17 tracks, but it does reveal the life force beating away inside a fascinating, original, troubled man."

Dave Simpson of The Guardian graded the album three stars out of five, but his review was more straightforwardly enthusiastic. He described the LP as "a rickety but entertaining mix of the best elements of his imperial period: tribal glam stomps, razor-slashed T.Rex guitars, two-drummer Glitter beats, knowing homages to cult icons ("Vince Taylor" and "Vivienne Westwood") and sex ... "Dirty Beast" offers a sweeter, poppier Ant than the glam-punk of yore. While nothing quite reaches the dizzy heights of "Antmusic", 'Shrink' – a perhaps autobiographical romp about a man who needs medication to feel normal – is as riotous as he's sounded in three decades.

Jeremy Allen in the NME was less complimentary, awarding the album 2 stars out of 5 and considering it to be too lengthy and too experimental. "(This is) an album that gives the middle finger to brevity ... really long name and record, painfully so at times. There are flashes of the old brilliance on "Shrink" but preceding number "Hardmenhardblokes" (sic) is as baffling as it is weird ... experimentalism meanders into the bizarre and unlistenable. That said, it's sort of heartening to have him back."

In the Metro, John Lewis was similarly sceptical, awarding two stars out of five and calling it a "patchy comeback album that often sounds like an unfinished, unmixed demo... There are moments ("Cool Zombie", "Vince Taylor", "How Can I Say I Miss You?") when Ant's pop majesty shines through but others ("Punkyoungirl", "Dirty Beast", "Sausage") that sound like Two Ronnies punk parodies."

== Singles ==
It was initially announced that "Gun in Your Pocket" would be the first single, with "Who's A Goofy Bunny?" as the B-side, a tribute to the recently deceased Malcolm McLaren.

On Absolute Radio on 4 January 2011, Ant announced that the first single would be a double A-side of "Hard Men, Tough Blokes" and "punkyoungirl", both tracks receiving their radio premieres on the show. However, no such release took place.

In an October 2012 Pollstar interview, Ant announced that the song "Cool Zombie" would be released as a 7" vinyl with "Gun in Your Pocket" as the B-side. Ant offered Facebook fans a chance to win a signed copy of the single. Both songs from the single were available for purchase from iTunes from 21 October 2012.

== Cultural references ==
"Vince Taylor" and "Stay in the Game" were used as the opening and closing themes for The Blueblack Hussar, a documentary about Ant's comeback during 2010–2011, directed by Jack Bond. The film contained footage of the above-mentioned preview playback given to Robb in early 2011, in which Ant and his friend Katherine d'Hubert were seen dancing together in Ant's kitchen to the track "Shrink" while Robb looked on.

== Track listing ==
All tracks are written by Adam Ant & Boz Boorer, except as noted.

No.	Title	Writer(s)	Length
1.	"Cool Zombie"	Ant, Chris McCormack	3:16
2.	"Stay in the Game"		3:38
3.	"Marrying the Gunner's Daughter"	Ant, Boorer, Matt Walker	4:36
4.	"Vince Taylor"		3:48
5.	"Valentines"		5:42
6.	"Darlin' Boy"		2:33
7.	"Dirty Beast"		3:41
8.	"Punkyoungirl"	Ant, Marco Pirroni	5:29
9.	"Sausage"	Ant, Pirroni	3:41
10.	"Cradle Your Hatred"	Ant, McCormack	4:58
11.	"Hardmentoughblokes"	Ant	3:51
12.	"Shrink"	Ant, McCormack	3:50
13.	"Vivienne's Tears"	Ant, Pirroni	3:28
14.	"Who's a Goofy Bunny?"	Ant	5:46
15.	"How Can I Say I Miss You?"		3:33
16.	"Bullshit"	Ant, McCormack	3:23
17.	"How Can I Say I Miss You? (Reprise)"		3:32
Total length:			68:53

=== Out-takes ===
In addition to the above track listing, between 2010 and the album's release Ant also discussed other potential candidates for inclusion on the album:

- "Gun in Your Pocket" (Ant), now released as the B-side to "Cool Zombie" (omitted from the album despite earlier stated intentions).
- "When I Was a Sperm" (Weldon Irvine, Joey Cavaseno), cover of song by Master Wel.
- "Bumpy Capers" (Ant), another rerecording of a 1997 "Blend Demos" track as with Ant and Pirroni's other collaborations on the album. Included on rough demonstration version of the album compiled in early 2011.

== Personnel ==
=== Musicians ===
- Adam Ant – vocals, guitars (tracks 9, 11 & 14), bass guitar (tracks 8, 9, 13 & 14), electric mandolin (tracks 9 & 13), keyboards (track 3)
- Marco Pirroni – guitars (tracks 8, 9 & 11)
- Boz Boorer – guitars and bass guitar (tracks 2–7, 15 & 17), double bass (track 17)
- Chris McCormack – guitars (tracks 10, 12 & 16)
- Tom Edwards – guitars & bass guitar (track 1)
- Andy Woodard – drums (track 1)
- Will Crewdson – guitars (track 14)
- Johnny Love – drums (track 14)
- Tree Carr – keyboards and glockenspiel (track 14)
- Matt Walker – drums (track 3)

=== Technical ===
- Adam Ant – producer (all tracks), concept, art direction
- Boz Boorer – producer (tracks 2–7, 15 & 17)
- Chris McCormack – producer (tracks 1, 10, 12 & 16)
- Mary Jane Ansell – album cover & back painting
- Sarah White – album design
- Barry Lategan – photography
- Kriss Allan – photography
- Andy Gotts – photography
- Rob Lucas – wardrobe design (for album artwork photographs & tour)

== Chart positions ==
Album

Chart (2013)	Peak position
UK Albums Chart	25
UK Indie Albums Chart	3

Singles

Year	Single	Chart	Peak position
2012	"Cool Zombie"	UK singles chart	154
