= Desperate But Not Serious (song) =

Single by Adam Ant

from the album Friend or Foe
- B-side: "Why Do Girls Love Horses?"
- Released: 19 November 1982
- Recorded: 1982
- Genre: New wave
- Length: 3:52 (Single Version) 4:12 (Album Version)
- Label: CBS Records
- Songwriters: Adam Ant & Marco Pirroni
- Producers: Adam Ant & Marco Pirroni

Adam Ant singles chronology
"Friend or Foe" (1982)	"Desperate But Not Serious" (1982)	"Puss'n Boots" (1983)

Music video
- Desperate But Not Serious by Adam Ant on YouTube

"Desperate But Not Serious" is a song by Adam Ant, released on 19 November 1982 as the third single from his first solo album, Friend or Foe. It peaked at number 33 on the UK Singles Chart, and number 66 on the Billboard Hot 100 in the US. Ant performed "Desperate but Not Serious" and "Goody Two Shoes" on the very first American Bandstand episode of 1983.

The song appears on the greatest hits collection, Antics in the Forbidden Zone, and both the studio version and a live version appear on the double Adam Ant compilation, Antmusic: The Very Best of Adam Ant.

== Credits ==
"Desperate But Not Serious" was written by Adam Ant and Marco Pirroni. The track features Adam on vocals and bass guitar, Marco on guitar, Geoff Daly on saxophone, Martin Drover on trumpet and Bogdan Wiczling on drums.

== "Why Do Girls Love Horses?" ==
It was fairly common for Ant to record new versions of his pre-1980 compositions for the B-side of his singles. For this single, an old Ant song from 1978 called "Why Do Girls Love Horses?" was used.

Ant first recorded the song as a four track home demo in July 1978 while living in Notting Hill Gate. The song remained unused until this particular version was recorded in 1982. "Why Do Girls Love Horses?" finally received its live debut in December 2010 at a concert at Camden's Electric Ballroom as part of Ant's World Tour of London 2010–2011.

== Charts ==
Chart (1982–83)	Position
Ireland (IRMA)	18
US Billboard Hot 100	66
UK Singles (OCC)	33
