= Kings of the Wild Frontier (song) =

British song

Single by Adam and the Ants

from the album Kings of the Wild Frontier
- B-side: "Press Darlings"
- Released: 25 July 1980
- Genre: Post-punk; new wave
- Length: 3:53
- Label: CBS
- Songwriters: Adam Ant; Marco Pirroni
- Producer: Chris Hughes

Adam and the Ants singles chronology
"Cartrouble" (1980)	"Kings of the Wild Frontier" (1980)	"Dog Eat Dog" (1980)

Music video
- "Kings of the Wild Frontier" by Adam and the Ants on YouTube

"Kings of the Wild Frontier" is a 1980 song by the English new wave group Adam and the Ants. Written by Adam Ant and Marco Pirroni, it was the title track of the band's second album and was also their first single for CBS Records after leaving the small independent label Do It Records.

== Release ==
Originally released on 25 July 1980, the single peaked at number 48 on the UK Singles Chart. While it was not the first pop song to do so, this was the first time the band employed the use of the two-drummer Burundi beat which then became one of their stylistic hallmarks.

Following the breakthrough success of "Dog Eat Dog" (UK #4) and 'Antmusic' (UK #2), the single was re-released in February 1981, peaking at number 2 in the UK singles chart.

== Reception ==
The Guardian said the song was "one of history's flat-out weirdest bids for screamy teen stardom: the lyrics beckon new fans in – "a wild nobility, we are the family" – set to a cacophony of thunderous drums, shouting, whooping, feedback and Duane Eddy-style guitar. It is unbelievably exciting."

"The extent of its success surprised us," Pirroni recalled. "We'd written the music as a soundtrack to the visuals – very Eighties. I took that cowboy guitar twang from Ennio Morricone's The Good, The Bad and The Ugly soundtrack. I was trying to get everything I liked into that record. And it worked."

== Lyrics ==
Although Adam Ant has proclaimed on several occasions to avoid politics in his lyrics, in "Kings of the Wild Frontier" he sings, "I feel beneath the white there is a redskin suffering from centuries of taming" about the American Indian (these lyrics are also printed on the back cover of the single).

== The Ants ==
For "Kings of the Wild Frontier", Adam's ever-changing line-up of Ants included Pirroni on guitar, Kevin Mooney on bass guitar and, on drums, both Chris Hughes (under the pseudonym "Merrick") and Terry Lee Miall.

== "Press Darlings" ==
"Kings of the Wild Frontier" was backed by the non-album track "Press Darlings". When the album was released in the US, the track "Making History" was dropped in favour of "Press Darlings" and "Physical (You're So)."

"Press Darlings" makes the point that Adam and the Ants are indeed not 'press darlings'. Ant had bad relations with British rock critic and musician Nick Kent as a result of Kent's NME review of the soundtrack album to Derek Jarman's film Jubilee. Kent labelled Ant a Nazi sympathiser, based upon the lyrics to "Deutscher Girls". In retaliation, Ant sarcastically name-checked Kent in "Press Darlings", claiming that "If passion ends in fashion, then Nick Kent is the best dressed man in town."

"Press Darlings" was written by Ant, arranged by Pirroni and produced by Chris Hughes.
