= Friend or Foe (Adam Ant song) =

Single by Adam Ant

from the album Friend or Foe
- B-side: "Juanito the Bandito"
- Released: 11 September 1982
- Recorded: 1982
- Genre: New wave
- Length: 3:23
- Label: CBS Records
- Songwriters: Adam Ant & Marco Pirroni
- Producers: Adam Ant & Marco Pirroni

Adam Ant singles chronology
"Goody Two Shoes" (1982)	"Friend or Foe" (1982)	"Desperate But Not Serious" (1982)

Music video
- "Friend or Foe" by Adam Ant on YouTube

"Friend or Foe" was the title track, and second single from Adam Ant's first solo album. It was released 11 September 1982, exactly one month before the album was released.

== Single ==
Compared to its predecessor, "Goody Two Shoes," (number one on the UK Singles Chart, and number twelve on the Billboard Hot 100 in the US), "Friend or Foe" was less successful. Though it peaked at number 9 on the UK Singles Chart, it was not released as a single in the U.S.

== Credits ==
"Friend or Foe" was written by Adam Ant and Marco Pirroni. The track features Adam Ant on vocals and bass guitar, Pironi on guitar, Jeff Daly on saxophone, Martin Drover on trumpet and Bogdan Wiczling on drums. An alternate version with Chris "Merrick" Hughes on drums appears on Antbox. The music video, which received heavy rotation on MTV, was directed by Adam Ant himself.

== "Juanito the Bandito" ==
Adam Ant frequently recorded new versions of his pre-1980 compositions for the B-sides of his single releases. For this record, an old Ant song from 1977 called "Juanito the Bandito" was selected. The song was first recorded as a home demo in Muswell Hill in May, 1977 and with a full band at Decca Studios in August, 1978. It was first performed live in January, 1978, and can be heard on the widely bootlegged concert at the Marquee Club on 12 January 1978. The song continued to be performed live sporadically until September, 1979. The single version was recorded in 1982. The song was subsequently played solo by Ant in 1987 at a fan convention and as a duet with Will Crewdson during an internet radio broadcast in 2010.
