= Wonderful (Adam Ant album) =

Studio album by Adam Ant
- Released: 7 March 1995
- Recorded: 1994
- Studio: Abbey Road, London
- Genre: Pop
- Length: 46:44
- Label: EMI
- Producer: David Tickle

Adam Ant chronology
B-Side Babies (1994)	Wonderful (1995)	Redux (2005)

Singles from Wonderful
- 1. "Wonderful" Released: January 1995; 2. "Gotta Be a Sin" Released: May 1995

Professional ratings
Review scores
Source	Rating
AllMusic	3/5 stars
NME	6/10
Rolling Stone	3/5 stars
The Rolling Stone Album Guide	1/5 stars
Select	3/5 medals

Wonderful is the fifth solo studio album and the eighth LP overall of English musician Adam Ant, released in March 1995 by EMI. It peaked at number 24 on the UK Album Chart and number 143 on the US Billboard 200 chart. The band for this album included Ant's long-time collaborator Marco Pirroni, along with ex-Ruts drummer Dave Ruffy and Morrissey's guitarist Boz Boorer.

This album includes more acoustic songs than Ant's previous albums. This album repositioned Adam as a more mature pop-rocker, with crafted songs that featured acoustic guitars as prominently as electric ones. The album was a moderate hit in the USA and UK, as was the single "Wonderful" which became Ant's third American Top 40 hit single. This was the first Adam Ant album to be released in the USA before the UK.

Its working title was Slapdash Eden and 25 tracks had been written for the project, of which eleven appeared on the final LP. The Japanese release came with a mini poster. Promotional cards were released, each card related to one of the album's tracks including Ant's real meanings behind the lyrics of the track.

== Track listing ==
All tracks are written by Adam Ant, Marco Pirroni & Boz Boorer, except as indicated.

No.	Title	Writer(s)	Length
1.	"Won't Take That Talk"		3:59
2.	"Beautiful Dream"	Ant, Pirroni, Kevin Mooney, John Reynolds	4:12
3.	"Wonderful"	Ant, Pirroni, Bonnie Hayes	4:22
4.	"1969 Again"		4:18
5.	"Yin and Yang"		4:33
6.	"Image of Yourself"		4:02
7.	"Alien"		3:39
8.	"Gotta Be a Sin"		4:13
9.	"Vampires"		4:35
10.	"Angel"		4:39
11.	"Very Long Ride"	Ant, Pirroni, Mooney, Reynolds	4:39
Total length:			46:44

== Personnel ==
- Adam Ant – vocals
- Marco Pirroni – acoustic guitar, guitar
- Boz Boorer – acoustic guitar, guitar, backing vocals
- Bruce Witkin – bass, mellotron, backing vocals
- Dave Ruffy – drums (except 10, 11)
- John Reynolds – drums (10, 11), drum programming (2, 10, 11)

Technical

- David Tickle – producer, mixing (at The Bunker, Malibu, California), band photography
- Chris Lawson – engineer
- Guy Massey – assistant engineer
- Anton Corbijn – photography
- Area – design
