= Friend or Foe (album) =

Studio album by Adam Ant
- Released: 11 October 1982
- Recorded: June 1982
- Studio: The Townhouse (London)
- Genres: New wave; pop
- Length: 39:44
- Labels: CBS; Epic (US)
- Producers: Adam Ant; Marco Pirroni

Adam Ant chronology
Prince Charming (1981)	Friend or Foe (1982)	Strip (1983)

Singles from Friend or Foe
- 1. "Goody Two Shoes" Released: 7 May 1982; 2. "Friend or Foe" Released: 11 September 1982; 3. "Desperate But Not Serious" Released: 19 November 1982

Professional ratings
Review scores
Source	Rating
AllMusic	4/5 stars
Christgau's Record Guide	B−
The Rolling Stone Album Guide	3/5 stars
Smash Hits	7/10 stars

Friend or Foe is the debut solo album by English singer and musician Adam Ant, released in October 1982 by Epic Records in the United States and CBS Records elsewhere. The album peaked at number 5 in the UK, Adam Ant's highest charting solo album in his homeland and number 16 in the US, the highest-charting album in America of Ant's entire career (both solo and with Adam and the Ants.)

"Much of the Friend Or Foe album is an invigorating and unusual mix of Burundi drumming and swing rhythms," writes Tom Ewing of Freaky Trigger, "and 'Goody Two Shoes' is the most infectious example."

== Release ==
Following the disbandment of the successful Ants earlier in 1982, Adam Ant began a solo career with fellow "Ant" guitarist and songwriter Marco Pirroni.

Like their previous band, which achieved 7 top-10 hits (2 at No. 1) in the UK Singles chart and the best-selling album of 1981 (Kings of the Wild Frontier), Ant's debut single "Goody Two-Shoes" was a smash hit. The single reached No. 1 in the UK and Australia in June 1982 and No. 12 in the US - Ant's first US hit single. The single "Friend or Foe" was released one month prior to the album in September 1982 and charted as high as No. 9 in the UK.

The album Friend or Foe was released in October 1982 and reached No. 5 on the UK Albums Chart and No. 16 on the US Billboard Album Chart, becoming Adam Ant's most successful solo album and the most successful album in America of his entire career. It was certified Gold by the BPI for sales in excess of 100,000 copies. and achieved US Gold Disc status. In addition to "Goody Two-Shoes" & "Friend or Foe", the album included another hit single: "Desperate But Not Serious" (UK No. 33 / US No. 66).

A remastered version of the album was released in 2005, featuring twelve additional tracks.

Ant performed the album live on tour in the US and UK in late 2019. A second United States leg planned for 2020 was postponed due to the COVID-19 pandemic and later cancelled.

== Track listing ==
All tracks are written by Adam Ant and Marco Pirroni, except "Hello, I Love You" by Jim Morrison, Ray Manzarek, Robby Krieger and John Densmore.

Side A
No.	Title	Length
1.	"Friend or Foe"	3:22
2.	"Something Girls"	3:52
3.	"Place in the Country"	2:50
4.	"Desperate But Not Serious"	4:14
5.	"Here Comes the Grump"	3:35
6.	"Hello, I Love You" (originally recorded by the Doors)	2:37

Side B
No.	Title	Length
7.	"Goody Two Shoes"	3:28
8.	"Crackpot History and the Right to Lie"	2:44
9.	"Made of Money"	3:28
10.	"Cajun Twisters"	2:56
11.	"Try This for Sighs"	3:03
12.	"Man Called Marco"	3:27

2005 reissue bonus tracks
No.	Title	Length
13.	"Goody Two Shoes" (Chris Hughes single version)	3:21
14.	"Coup d'Etat" (Original album outtake)	3:11
15.	"Goody Two Shoes" (Demo recording)	3:12
16.	"Here Comes the Grump" (Demo recording)	2:27
17.	"Little Italy" (Demo recording of "Man Called Marco")	2:19
18.	"Made of Money" (Demo recording; Adam on drums)	2:50
19.	"Place in the Country" (Demo recording; Adam on drums)	3:01
20.	"And So You Shall" (Demo recording)	3:40
21.	"Yellowbeard" (Demo recording for potential film score)	2:26
22.	"I Know They Know" (Demo recording, rework of 1979 demo "Violin Fights")	3:50
23.	"Gargoyles Are Go" (Demo recording)	2:23
24.	"Good Sex Rumples the Clothing" (Previously unreleased track, rework of 1977 home demo)	3:01

== Personnel ==
Credits adapted from the album's liner notes.

- Adam Ant – vocals (1–11), bass (1–8, 10–12), marimba (1), percussion (1, 2), sticks (1, 11), acoustic guitar (3, 7), rhythm guitar (4), violin (8), triangle (8), backing vocals (12), brass arrangements, production, cover design
- Marco Pirroni – guitar (1–12), castanets (8), bass (9), acoustic guitar (12), percussion (12), spoken vocals (12), brass arrangements, production
- Bogdan Wiczling – drums (1–12), sticks (1, 11)
- Martin Drover – trumpet (1–4, 6–11), flugelhorn (10)
- Jeff Daly – saxophone (1–4, 6–9, 11)
- Jude Kelly – additional vocals (4)
- Sam Brown, Sonia Jones, Vicki Brown – backing vocals (6)

Technical

- Alan Douglas – engineer
- Gavin Mackillop – tape operator
- George Chambers – tape operator
- Allan Ballard – front cover photography
- Julian Balme – graphic design

== Chart positions ==
Chart (1982–1983)	Peak position
Australian Albums (Kent Music Report)	60
Canada Top Albums/CDs (RPM)	14
Dutch Albums (Album Top 100)	33
German Albums (Offizielle Top 100)	55
Swedish Albums (Sverigetopplistan)	36
UK Albums (Official Charts)	5
US Billboard 200	16
US Cash Box Top 200	17
