= Prince Charming (album) =

Studio album by Adam and the Ants
- Released: 6 November 1981
- Studios: Air Studios, London, England
- Genre: New wave
- Length: 37:21
- Label: CBS
- Producer: Chris Hughes

Adam and the Ants chronology
Kings of the Wild Frontier (1980)	Prince Charming (1981)	Friend or Foe (1982)

Singles from Prince Charming
- 1. "Stand and Deliver" Released: 1 May 1981; 2. "Prince Charming" Released: 4 September 1981; 3. "Ant Rap" Released: 4 December 1981

Prince Charming is the third and final album by Adam and the Ants, released on 6 November 1981. This album features bass player Gary Tibbs in place of Kevin Mooney, the bassist on Kings of the Wild Frontier. The album included the band's two number one UK hit singles "Stand and Deliver" and "Prince Charming" as well as "Ant Rap".

The album peaked at number 2 in the UK charts and received mixed reviews from critics.

== Release ==
Prince Charming was released in November 1981 by CBS Records. The album spawned the two UK number 1 singles "Stand and Deliver" (with a different ending from the single version) and "Prince Charming", which reached number 1 in April and September 1981 respectively, and "Ant Rap" which reached number 3 in January 1982 when it was remixed.

The album was remastered and reissued in 2004 with six bonus demo tracks. On 10 September 2008, the Daily Mail gave away a CD copy of Prince Charming with the newspaper.

== Reception ==
Professional ratings
Review scores
Source	Rating
AllMusic	3.5/5 stars
Rolling Stone	3.5/5 stars
Smash Hits	5/10 stars

Writing in Smash Hits magazine in November 1981, Ian Birch gave the album 5 out of 10 and commented "Gone are the strong melodies that made Kings of the Wild Frontier so addictive; in are elaborate details (the intros are the highpoint here)... The surface might be glossily busy but it's no substitute for good songs." In his retrospective review, AllMusic's Stephen Thomas Erlewine wrote that "the songs just aren't there", stating that it "simply has style and sound – which, in retrospect, isn't all that bad", while Rolling Stone called it "exactly the same album [as Kings of the Wild Frontier], except with a blue cover." Trouser Press called it "a letdown" and that "much of the LP seems forced, ill-tempered and silly."

== Alleged plagiarism ==
The song "Prince Charming" employs strong musical influences in common with Rolf Harris' 1965 song "War Canoe", and in March 2010 Harris claimed on BBC Radio 5 Live's Danny Baker Show that an out-of-court settlement had been reached and a large sum of royalties received after a musicologist had found the two songs to be musically identical. "Prince Charming" producer Chris Hughes has stated that Harris withdrew his complaint "with a bit of a giggle" when Adam Ant pointed out that both tracks borrowed heavily from a recording of an old Maori 'War Canoe'-type song.

== Track listing ==
All tracks are written by Adam Ant and Marco Pirroni.

Side A
No.	Title	Length
1.	"Scorpios"	2:46
2.	"Picasso Visita el Planeta de los Simios"	3:28
3.	"Prince Charming"	3:18
4.	"Five Guns West"	5:02
5.	"That Voodoo!"	4:18

Side B
No.	Title	Length
1.	"Stand and Deliver"	3:35
2.	"Mile High Club"	2:42
3.	"Ant Rap"	3:26
4.	"Mowhok"	3:28
5.	"S.E.X."	3:50
6.	"The Lost Hawaiians" (unlisted track - an instrumental re-recording of "Los Rancheros" from Kings of the Wild Frontier)	1:05

2004 reissue bonus tracks
No.	Title	Length
12.	"Prince Charming" (Demo)	3:09
13.	"Stand and Deliver" (Demo)	3:04
14.	"Showbiz" (Demo)	3:07
15.	"Picasso Visits the Planet of the Apes" (Demo)	3:21
16.	"Who's a Goofy Bunny Then?" (Demo)	4:24
17.	"Scorpio Writing" (Demo)	3:20

Note: Some releases have "Prince Charming" as track 1 and "Scorpios" as track 3.

== Personnel ==
Adam and the Ants

- Adam Ant – vocals, bass, harmonica
- Marco Pirroni – guitar
- Merrick – drums, production, acoustic guitar on "Prince Charming"
- Terry Lee Miall – drums
- Gary Tibbs – bass

Technical

- Ross Cullum – engineering

== Chart positions ==
Chart (1981–82)	Peak position
Australian Albums (Kent Music Report)	7
Canada Top Albums/CDs (RPM)	45
Dutch Albums (Album Top 100)	5
German Albums (Offizielle Top 100)	21
Japanese Albums (Oricon Albums Chart)	51
New Zealand Albums (RMNZ)	43
Swedish Albums (Sverigetopplistan)	29
UK Albums (Official Charts)	2
US Billboard 200	94
US Cash Box Top 200	85

== In popular culture ==
Posters promoting the album are plastered across a wall in the 2008 première episode of Ashes to Ashes, signaling Alex Drake's arrival in 1981.
