= Strip (Adam Ant album) =

Studio album by Adam Ant
- Released: 7 November 1983
- Recorded: Summer 1983
- Studios: Polar Studios, Stockholm, Sweden
- Genre: Synth-pop
- Length: 38:58
- Label: CBS/Columbia
- Producers: Adam Ant; Richard James Burgess; Phil Collins; Hugh Padgham; Marco Pirroni

Adam Ant chronology
Friend or Foe (1982)	Strip (1983)	Vive Le Rock (1985)

Singles from Strip
- 1. "Puss 'n Boots" Released: October 1983; 2. "Strip" Released: December 1983

Strip is the second solo studio album by Adam Ant, and counting his work with Adam and the Ants, his fifth studio album. It was released in 1983 and a stylistic departure from Ant's previous musical efforts. This record is much less rock-oriented and more grounded in pop and dance. Ant continued his songwriting collaboration with Marco Pirroni for the album. Along with Richard James Burgess and Ant, Pirroni was one of the album's main producers. The album did not perform as well in Ant's home country as his previous albums and performed modestly in the US. Critics generally reviewed it unfavorably.

== Production ==
Phil Collins plays drums on "Puss 'n Boots" and "Strip", Collins also aided in production duties for the two tracks he played on, and enlisted Hugh Padgham to assist with the production and engineering of those sessions. Singer Anni-Frid Lyngstad, of ABBA fame, also performs the female spoken part on "Strip".

== Content ==
The cover photograph was fashioned after actress Jane Russell's famous photo from Howard Hughes's 1943 film The Outlaw.

== Release ==
The lead single from the album in Europe and Australia was "Puss 'n Boots", which continued the pantomime themes and fashions of Ant's earlier work. The single reached number 5 on the UK chart in November 1983, becoming Ant's final UK top 10 hit, although other top 20 hits would follow. The title track, "Strip", was released as a single in December 1983 and reached number 41 on the UK singles chart and number 42 in the U.S. "Puss 'n Boots" was released as the second single in the U.S. in May 1984, but failed to chart. "Playboy" was planned to be the third single.

== Reception ==
Professional ratings
Review scores
Source	Rating
AllMusic	2/5 stars
The Rolling Stone Album Guide	2/5 stars
Smash Hits	6/10

From contemporary reviews, Ian Birch wrote in Smash Hits that the new songs on the album feature a "new and much fresher style" from Adam Ant, specifically noting "more thoughtful writing, more adventurous arrangements" and "sharper singing while the "obsession with sex gets a bit ridiculous but if you keep a sense of humour, it soon fades into the background."

== Tour ==
An extensive tour of the U.S. was undertaken after the release. Ant settled on a deal with his tour manager, Michael Kleffman, that would give him a pay bonus if the album or the following album peaked within the top 20 on the U.S. Billboard 200. Neither the album nor its follow-up, Vive Le Rock, managed to do so, with the former peaking at #65 and the latter peaking at #131.

Some performances of the tour can be found on YouTube. It was the biggest American tour of Ant's career, with dates in many cities, and was famous for the showmanship involved; this included a Houdini-style immersion tank, which Ant would jump in and emerge from wearing only black shorts – after "stripping" his stage costume off during the course of the show.

== Track listing ==
All tracks are written by Adam Ant & Marco Pirroni.

Side A
No.	Title	Length
1.	"Strip"	3:48
2.	"Baby, Let Me Scream at You"	4:07
3.	"Libertine"	4:19
4.	"Spanish Games"	3:00
5.	"Vanity"	4:08

Side B
No.	Title	Length
6.	"Puss 'n Boots"	3:52
7.	"Playboy"	3:50
8.	"Montreal"	4:23
9.	"Navel to Neck"	3:41
10.	"Amazon"	3:50
Total length:		38:59

Additional tracks on the 2005 remaster

11. "Strip" (Demo recording)
12. "Dirty Harry" (Demo recording)
13. "Horse You Rode in On" (Demo recording)
14. "She Wins Zulus" (Demo recording)
15. "Puss 'n Boots" (Demo recording)
16. "Playboy" (Rehearsal recording, Compass Point Studios, Bahamas)
17. "Navel to Neck" (Rehearsal recording, Compass Point Studios)
18. "Strip" (Live studio version, Polar Studios)

== Personnel ==
- Adam Ant – vocals, bass, guitars (2), percussion (9)
- Richard James Burgess – keyboards (2–5, 7–10), drums (2–5, 7–10), percussion (2–5, 7–10)
- Marco Pirroni – guitars (1, 3–10)
- Phil Collins – drums (1, 6), percussion (1, 6)
- Rutger Gunnarsson – brass and string arrangements
- Anni-Frid Lyngstad – spoken vocals (1) (uncredited)

Production

- Phil Collins – producer (1, 6)
- Hugh Padgham – co-producer (1, 6), engineer (1, 6)
- Adam Ant – producer (2–5, 7–10), cover design
- Richard James Burgess – producer (2–5, 7–10)
- Marco Pirroni – producer (2–5, 7–10)
- Paris Edvinsson – engineer (2–5, 7–10)
- Michael B. Tretow – mixing (2–5, 7–10)
- Anders Andersson – production assistance
- Jean-Luc Fauvel – production assistance
- Mark Freegard – production assistance
- Radu Wouk – production assistance
- Allan Ballard – photography

== Chart positions ==
Chart (1983–84)	Peak position
Canada Top Albums/CDs (RPM)	84
Dutch Albums (Album Top 100)	44
UK Albums (Official Charts)	20
US Billboard 200	65
US Cash Box Top 200	48
