= Vive Le Rock =

Studio album by Adam Ant
- Released: 2 September 1985
- Recorded: January–March 1985
- Studios: Good Earth Studios, Soho, London
- Genre: Rock
- Length: 36:40
- Label: CBS
- Producer: Tony Visconti

Adam Ant chronology
Strip (1983)	Vive Le Rock (1985)	Manners & Physique (1990)

Singles from Vive Le Rock
- 1. "Apollo 9" Released: 10 September 1984; 2. "Vive Le Rock" Released: 1 July 1985

Professional ratings
Review scores
Source	Rating
AllMusic	2/5 stars
Kerrang!	5/5 stars
The Rolling Stone Album Guide	2/5 stars

Vive Le Rock is the third solo album by Adam Ant, released in September 1985, which contained two versions of Ant's 1984 song "Apollo 9".

== Production ==
Producer Tony Visconti, famous for his 1970s work with Ant's heroes Marc Bolan and David Bowie, commented on his work with Ant on Vive Le Rock: "What a creative ball of energy! He was great to work with. He's very opinionated and knows what he wants. We didn't quite agree during the mixes, he kind of wanted everything very trebly and I'm a bassey kind of producer."

The album was a realisation of the new "rockers in space" ethic and look Adam Ant had begun with the hit UK single "Apollo 9" in September 1984, which peaked at number 13.

== Release ==
"Apollo 9" was released as a single a year before Vive Le Rock's release, and was a chart hit. However, the album received only minor attention in the United States, peaking at number 131, and number 42 in the United Kingdom. The title track was the one single from the album released in the US. Ant performed "Vive Le Rock" at the 1985 benefit concert Live Aid. It was the only song he played at the show, as the band preceding him on the bill, The Boomtown Rats (for whom concert co-organiser Bob Geldof was the front man) overran their allotted time.

Ant has said that the failure of Vive Le Rock, and his then-current record label's unwillingness to promote it, left him depressed and unenthusiastic about his future in music. This led to his decision to focus primarily on his acting career, not releasing another album until Manners & Physique in 1990. although work had been in progress on that album since 1986.

Twelfth track "Human Bondage Den" was released on the original cassette and CD release of this album (as a bonus non-LP track). Most re-releases did not feature this track until Columbia Records re-released the album in 2005, along with seven other bonus tracks.

== Track listing ==
All tracks are written by Adam Ant & Marco Pirroni.

Side A
No.	Title	Length
1.	"Vive Le Rock"	3:39
2.	"Miss Thing"	3:08
3.	"Razor Keen"	3:49
4.	"Rip Down"	3:23
5.	"Scorpio Rising"	4:04

Side B
No.	Title	Length
6.	"Apollo 9"	3:22
7.	"Hell's Eight Acres"	3:51
8.	"Mohair Lockeroom Pin-Up Boys"	3:14
9.	"No Zap"	3:14
10.	"P.O.E."	3:24
11.	"Apollo 9 (A cappella Reprise)"	1:32
Total length:		36:40

CD and cassette versions bonus track
No.	Title	Length
12.	"Human Bondage Den"	3:07

2005 reissue bonus tracks

13. "Vive Le Rock" (Unreleased Rico Conning 12" mix) - 7:28
14. "Apollo 9" (Unreleased François Kevorkian 7" mix) - 3:41
15. "Doggy Style" (Unreleased demo) - 3:48
16. "Night They Vietcong" (Unreleased demo) - 3:06
17. "Big Big Man" ("Razor Keen") (Unreleased demo) - 3:28
18. "Rip Down" (Unreleased demo) - 3:15
19. "Apollo 9" (François Kevorkian Splashdown 12" mix) - 6:46
20. "Vive Le Rock" (Unreleased Steve Thompson 12" mix) - 3:49

== Personnel ==
- Adam Ant – lead vocals, piano
- Marco Pirroni – guitars
- Chris Constantinou (as Chris De Niro) – bass, backing vocals
- "Count" Bogdan Wiczling – drums, percussion

Technical

- Tony Visconti – producer, engineer
- Sven Taits – assistant engineer
- Francois Kevorkian – mixing (track 11)
- Ray Staff – mastering
- Adam Ant, Rob O'Connor – sleeve concept
- Nick Knight – photography
