= Goody Two Shoes (song) =

Single by Adam Ant

from the album Friend or Foe
- B-side: "Red Scab" "Crackpot History and the Right To Lie" (US/Canada)
- Released: 7 May 1982
- Genre: New wave; dance-rock; pop rock; big band
- Length: 3:28 (album/ US single version); 3:15 (UK single version)
- Label: CBS; Epic (US/Canada)
- Songwriters: Adam Ant; Marco Pirroni
- Producers: Chris Hughes (UK single version); Adam Ant/Marco Pirroni (album/US single version)

Adam Ant singles chronology
"The B-Sides" (1982)	"Goody Two Shoes" (1982)	"Friend or Foe" (1982)

Music video
- "Goody Two Shoes" on YouTube

"Goody Two Shoes" is the debut solo single by Adam Ant, released on 7 May 1982. It became Ant's third overall number one in the UK (the other two being from his band Adam and the Ants) and his highest-charting song in the US, where it peaked at number 12. The song's lyrics are satirical, mocking the UK tabloid press and their obsession with Ant's clean lifestyle ("Don't drink, don't smoke, what do you do?").

== History ==
There are two versions of the cover. The first has Adam and the Ants across the top of the sleeve and the later version just Adam Ant. This is probably due to the confusion around the timing of Ant going solo, particularly as the song was performed by three fifths of the band: Ant, Pirroni and Hughes.

There are also two different studio versions of the song. The UK 7" single version is notably different from the re-recorded version which appears on Friend or Foe. The single version has a different, more reverberating drum track. The Friend or Foe version, instead of Hughes on drums, features Bogdan Wiczling, drummer on the rest of the album.

Ant performed "Goody Two Shoes" at Top of the Pops on 20 May 1982, and the very first American Bandstand episode of 1983 (along with "Desperate but Not Serious").

== "Red Scab" ==
It was fairly common for Ant to record new versions of his pre-1980 compositions for the B-side of his singles. For this single, an old Ant song from 1977 called "Red Scab" was used.

== Music video ==
The video presents a stylised vision of a day in the life of Adam Ant, from dressing in the morning to performing on stage, to being hounded by the media. At the end of the day, he takes home a woman journalist played by British actress Caroline Munro, in effect answering the song's theme question, "What do you do?" The video also starred Graham Stark and Dandy Nichols as the butler and cleaning woman. The DJ Norman Cook, then unknown, appears as a reporter.

== Track listing ==
All songs written by Adam Ant except as noted.

1. "Goody Two Shoes" (Adam Ant, Marco Pirroni) – 3:15
2. "Red Scab" – 4:06

== Chart performance ==
=== Weekly charts ===
Weekly chart performance for "Goody Two Shoes"
Chart (1982–1983)	Peak position
Australia (Kent Music Report)	1
Belgium (Ultratop 50 Flanders)	16
Canada Top Singles (RPM)	4
Germany (GfK)	5
Ireland (IRMA)	2
Netherlands (Dutch Top 40)	8
Netherlands (Single Top 100)	13
New Zealand (Recorded Music NZ)	29
UK Singles (Official Charts)	1
US Billboard Hot 100	12
US Billboard Top Tracks	7
US Cashbox	12

=== Year-end charts ===
1982 year-end chart performance for "Goody Two Shoes"
Chart (1982)	Rank
Australia (Kent Music Report)	40
Netherlands (Single Top 100)	100

1983 year-end chart performance for "Goody Two Shoes"
Chart (1983)	Rank
Canada Top Singles (RPM)	36
US Billboard Hot 100	51
US Cashbox	80

== Other media ==
- "Goody Two Shoes" was featured in the film Hot Fuzz and the television series The Umbrella Academy.

== Covers ==
- Punk band Unwritten Law later covered this song.
- In 2014, singer-songwriters Jim Boggia and Pete Donnelly released a cover version of the song on the multi-artist compilation album Here Comes The Reign Again: The Second British Invasion.
- With altered lyrics, it was used in a 1984 commercial for milk.

== See also ==
- The History of Little Goody Two-Shoes
- List of number-one singles in Australia during the 1980s
- List of UK singles chart number ones of the 1980s
