= Adam Ant =

English singer and musician (born 1954)

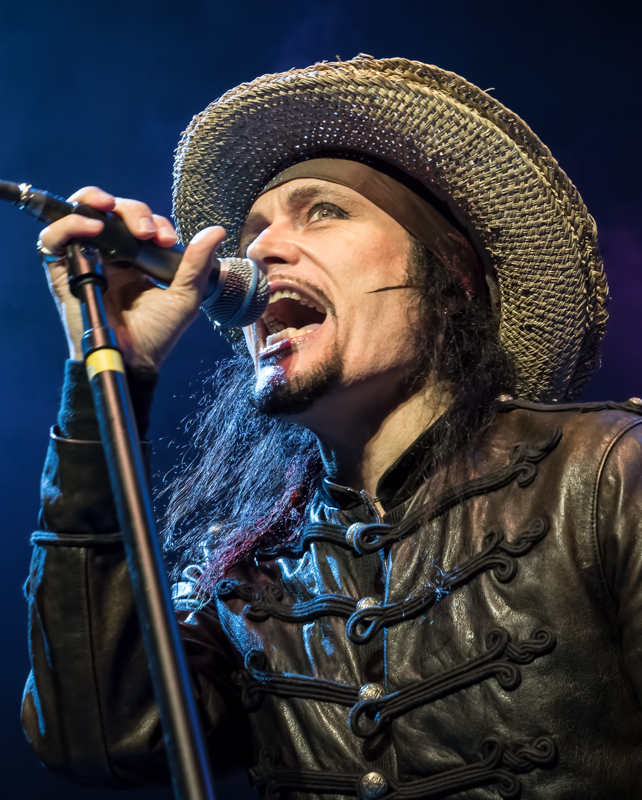
- Ant performing in 2017

Background information
- Born: Stuart Leslie Goddard; 3 November 1954 (age 72); Marylebone, London, England
- Genres: New wave; post-punk; alternative rock; dance-rock
- Occupations: Musician; singer; songwriter; actor
- Instruments: Vocals; guitar; bass; harmonica; piano; mandolin
- Years active: 1970–present
- Labels: CBS; Columbia; MCA; EMI; Blueblack Hussar
- Formerly of: Bazooka Joe; Adam and the Ants
- Website: adam-ant.com

Stuart Leslie Goddard (born 3 November 1954), known professionally as Adam Ant, is an English musician and actor. He gained popularity as the lead singer of new wave group Adam and the Ants and later as a solo artist, scoring 10 UK top ten hits from 1980 to 1983, including three UK No. 1 singles. He has also worked as an actor, appearing in many films and television episodes.

Ant began his musical career playing bass in the band Bazooka Joe. From 1977 to 1982 he performed with Adam and the Ants. Their debut album Dirk Wears White Sox (1979) reached number one on the UK Independent Albums Chart. Between recording and releasing his debut album as Adam and the Ants, he asked producer Malcolm McLaren to manage his band; McLaren instead took his backing band to form Bow Wow Wow. Ant regrouped with new members, including Marco Pirroni, to release his second album Kings of the Wild Frontier (1980). It reached number one in the UK Album Chart, spawned three hit singles, became the UK number-one selling album in 1981, and won Best British Album at the 1982 BRIT Awards. He released his third and final album with the group, Prince Charming (1981), which spawned two UK number-one singles "Stand and Deliver" and "Prince Charming".

In 1982, he began a solo career, retaining Marco Pirroni as co-songwriter. His first solo album was Friend or Foe (1982), from which the debut single "Goody Two Shoes" reached number one in the UK and Australia in 1982, and became his first top 20 hit in the United States on the Billboard Hot 100. The album reached number five on the UK Albums Chart and number 16 on the US Billboard 200 album chart, becoming his most successful solo album. His next two solo albums Strip (1983) and Vive Le Rock (1985) were less commercially successful. Ant began to focus on an acting career, performing on stage and in film and television roles throughout the 1980s and 1990s. He released his fourth solo album Manners & Physique (1990) which was produced by André Cymone and featured a Minneapolis sound. Despite the US top 20 success of the single "Room at the Top", Ant was dropped from MCA Records, and his album Persuasion (1991) was shelved and never officially released. He signed with Capitol Records to release Wonderful (1995). The single "Wonderful" became Ant's third US top 40 hit single.

Since 2010, Ant has continued his music career, recording and releasing a new album Adam Ant Is the Blueblack Hussar in Marrying the Gunner's Daughter (2013, UK number 25), and completing nine full-length UK national tours, six US national tours, and two Australian tours. A further album, Bravest of the Brave, was recorded in 2014 and is still awaiting release.

== Early life ==
Stuart Leslie Goddard was born in Marylebone, London on 3 November 1954, the only child of Leslie Alfred Goddard and Betty Kathleen Smith. His father had served in the Royal Air Force (RAF) and worked as a chauffeur, and his mother was an embroiderer for Norman Hartnell. His home was two rooms in the De Walden buildings, St John's Wood. He recalls: "There was no luxury, but there was always food on the table." He is of partial Romani descent; his maternal grandfather, Walter Albany Smith, was Romanichal. This heritage became a basis for a theme in his later work: a concern for oppressed minorities.

Goddard's parents divorced when he was seven years old and his mother supported him by working as a domestic cleaner, being briefly employed by Paul McCartney. Goddard's first school was Robinsfield Infants School, where he created a considerable stir by throwing a brick through the head-teacher's office window on two consecutive days. In the aftermath of this incident, Goddard was placed under the supervision of teacher Joanna Saloman, who encouraged him to develop his abilities in art and whom he later credited as the first person to show him he could be creative.

Goddard then attended Barrow Hill Junior School where he boxed and was a member of the cricket team. He passed the eleven plus exam to gain a place at St Marylebone Grammar School, an all-boys school, where he enjoyed history, played rugby, and became a school prefect. After passing six O levels and three A levels, in English, History and Art, Goddard attended Hornsey College of Art to study graphic design, and was a student of art historian Peter Webb for a time. He dropped out of Hornsey, short of completing his BA, to focus on a career in music.

=== Early musical career ===
The first band Goddard joined was Bazooka Joe, in which he played bass guitar. He has said that the idea of Adam Ant came to him after watching the Sex Pistols play their first gig opening for Bazooka Joe at Saint Martin's School of Art in 1975: "After seeing the Pistols, I wanted to do something different, be someone else, but couldn't work out what and [who]."^{: 92, 94}

He renamed himself Adam Ant, choosing the name because "I really knew I wanted to be Adam, because Adam was the first man. Ant I chose because, if there's a nuclear explosion, the ants will survive." He formed his own band, the B-Sides, with Lester Square and Andy Warren.^{: 94} In 1977, together with drummer Paul Flanagan, they went on to form Adam and the Ants (initially named just "The Ants"), with the inaugural band meeting held in the audience at a Siouxsie and the Banshees performance at The Roxy in London's Covent Garden.

== Musical career ==
=== 1977–1982: Adam and the Ants ===
Adam and the Ants began performing around London while Ant acted in Derek Jarman's film Jubilee in 1977. They were initially managed by Jordan from the SEX boutique on Kings Road. His debut as a recording artist was the song "Deutscher Girls", which featured on the film's soundtrack, along with "Plastic Surgery" which was performed in the film. In late 1979 they released their debut album Dirk Wears White Sox (1979, Do It Records) featuring Matthew Ashman on guitar, Andy Warren on bass and Dave Barbarossa on drums.

Ant approached Malcolm McLaren to manage the band, who subsequently hired the rest of the Ants to form Bow Wow Wow fronted by Annabella Lwin. The second version of Adam and the Ants featured Marco Pirroni (guitar), Kevin Mooney (bass guitar), and two drummers, Terry Lee Miall and Chris Hughes (formerly of Dalek I Love You), who used the name "Merrick". The band signed a deal with CBS Records and recorded Kings of the Wild Frontier during the summer of 1980. The album gained success in the United Kingdom, and the "Antmania" that ensued put the band at the forefront of the New Romantic movement. The single "Antmusic" went to No. 2 on the UK singles chart by December 1980. Following the departure of Mooney in February 1981, bassist Gary Tibbs, formerly of Roxy Music, joined the band.

In November 1981, Adam & the Ants released the album, Prince Charming, that featured two United Kingdom No. 1 singles – "Stand and Deliver" and the title track, "Prince Charming" – as well as the No. 3 UK hit "Ant Rap". In March 1982 the group disbanded.

=== 1982–2001: Solo career ===
A few months after Adam and the Ants split, Ant launched his solo career and retained Pirroni as guitarist and co-songwriter. Merrick also briefly stayed as drummer and producer for the UK edition of the first solo hit single "Goody Two Shoes" – which made it to No. 1 in the UK – and demos for the upcoming Friend or Foe album, before moving on to other production work. The Friend or Foe album also produced another top ten single, its title track "Friend or Foe", which reached No. 9 in September 1982.

Ant recruited a new band for touring, consisting of new dual drummers Bogdan Wiczling (ex-Fingerprintz) and Barry Watts (ex-Q-Tips), plus guitarist Cha Burns (also ex-Fingerprintz), bassist Chris Constantinou and the former Q-Tips brass section of trumpeter Tony Hughes and twin saxophonists Stewart van Blandamer and Steve Farr. The new band made its debut at London's Astoria Theatre on 1 October 1982. A US tour began in New York on 8 November. On the 19th tour date on 20 February 1983 in Cleveland, Ohio, Ant suffered a knee injury onstage (a relapse of a previous injury suffered while filming Jubilee in 1977), forcing the postponement or cancellation of dates throughout February and March while he recuperated. Ant eventually returned to performing, appearing as a guest on the NBC special Motown 25: Yesterday, Today, Forever, singing "Where Did Our Love Go" with Diana Ross. He resumed the US tour, completed on 18 May 1983 at the Bronco Bowl in Dallas, Texas.

During his recuperation from the knee injury, Ant worked with Pirroni on new material that formed the basis of Ant's second solo album, Strip. With promotion on the Strip album complete, Ant reduced his band to the quartet of himself, Pirroni (now out of retirement again), Wiczling and Constantinou. The latter two adopted the stage names Count Wiczling and Chris De Niro respectively and were upgraded from live backing musicians to being full-time band members, featured on record sleeves, logos and even in song lyrics. The LP Strip produced a top ten single, "Puss'n Boots", that reached No. 5 in the UK charts in October 1983. Ant formally unveiled his new four-piece band at the 1984 Montreux Pop Festival,

In July 1985, Ant secured a spot at the Live Aid concert – the first live performance of the "Ant/Marco/Wiczling/De Niro" band – but was asked to cut his set to one song, for which he chose his new single, the Vive Le Rock title track Ant later said he regretted playing the fundraiser, stating, "I was asked by Sir Bob to promote this concert. They had no idea they could sell it out. Then in Bob's book, he said, 'Adam was over the hill so I let him have one number.'... Doing that show was the biggest f**king mistake in the world. Knighthoods were made, Bono got it made, and it was a waste of f**king time. It was the end of rock 'n' roll."

A year after the hit single success of "Apollo 9", which reached No. 13 in September 1984, the parent album Vive Le Rock was released in September 1985, to mixed reviews. As part of the promotion, the band performed a live TV session for Channel 4 music show Bliss hosted by Muriel Gray. Several songs were recorded, although only two – "Miss Thing" from the new album and "Killer in the Home" from Kings of the Wild Frontier – were actually transmitted.

Ant paused his career in music at the end of 1985 to focus on his acting career. His Fort Lauderdale show was Ant's last full-length concert until February 1993. Indeed, between December 1982 and February 1995, Ant's only public live concerts outside North America were the four aforementioned UK/Spanish shows, Live Aid, a 1987 fanclub party performance, and a September 1994 EMI corporate event in Brighton. He severed ties with CBS in late 1986, following the release of the Hits audio/VHS compilation. In 1990, Ant returned with Manners & Physique, a collaboration with André Cymone, a solo artist and an early member of Prince's band. The album was another moderate success, and featured the single "Room at the Top", which was a Top 20 hit on both sides of the Atlantic. "Rough Stuff" became the second single for the United States and Germany as "Can't Set Rules About Love" charted in the United Kingdom.

In 1992, Nine Inch Nails released a cover of Adam & the Ants' "Physical (You're So)" on their Broken EP, originally released on the Kings of the Wild Frontier LP." Subsequently in 1995, Adam Ant performed "Physical" live with Nine Inch Nails on their Self Destruct Tour for two nights in a row.

In 1995, Ant released the album, Wonderful. The title track was a successful single, as was a tour of the US in support of the album. While Ant and his group, which retained longtime guitarist Pirroni alongside Kris Dollimore (The Godfathers, The Damned), Bruce Whitkin, Dave Ruffy (The Ruts) and Dave Barbarossa (Adam and the Ants, Bow Wow Wow), played in smaller venues than they had played in the 1980s, the houses were often packed with enthusiastic fans. The tour was cut short due to Ant and Pirroni both contracting glandular fever. Ant also played three shows at Shepherd's Bush Empire in London and did a mini tour of Virgin Record Shops playing selected tunes from the album Wonderful and signing records. Adam and his band also played shows in Dublin, Glasgow, Middlesbrough and Stoke-on-Trent.

In 1996, Ant and Pirroni recorded two new songs, "Lamé" and "Inseminator", for the soundtrack to Ant's latest film Drop Dead Rock. Also around this time, they recorded a cover version of the T. Rex song "Dandy in the Underworld". The duo continued to demo other songs around this time, including such titles as "Tough Blokes", "Justine", "Picasso Meets Gary Cooper" and "Call Me Sausage" (the last of which leaked out into bootleg circulation among fans). These new songs with Pirroni were for Ant's own new label Blend Records. Pirroni later referred to these recordings as the Blend Demos. They also guested with such bands as Dweeb and Rachel Stamp. In 2001, following the 11 September attacks, Ant recorded a charity single for New York firefighters; a double A-side of Neil Diamond's "America" with his own song "Big Trouble". In interviews from the time, Ant talked of numerous varied plans, including starting another new record label, reforming Adam and the Ants, and a star-studded benefit concert for a forest in Patagonia.

=== 2002–2009: Autobiography ===
In 2003, the Channel 4 television special titled The Madness of Prince Charming was aired in the UK documenting Ant's career and his struggle with mental illness (he was diagnosed as suffering with bipolar disorder).

In 2003, Ant and Wonderful collaborator, Boz Boorer, teamed with the Dian Fossey Gorilla Fund (now called The Gorilla Organisation) in a reworking of "Stand and Deliver" as "Save the Gorillas" for an EP of the same name along with four primate/rainforest-themed covers. Originally intended as a benefit record for the endangered mountain gorilla, it was never released, due to copyright and licensing issues relating to the title track. One track from the EP, "Jungle Rock", was eventually released on Boorer's 2008 solo LP Miss Pearl.

Ant made a guest appearance on an EP released in 2005 – Mike's Bikes by former Ants bassist Kevin Mooney's new band, the Lavender Pill Mob, on Mooney's own label Le Coq Musique. Ant provided lead vocals for "Black Pirates", a reworking of the song "Chicken Outlaw" by Mooney's earlier band Wide Boy Awake, inspired by Mooney's departure from the Ants.

In September 2006, he published his autobiography, Stand & Deliver. Marking the release of the book, Ant did a UK book signing, which went from London to Edinburgh. After the success of the first edition the paperback edition was published in September 2007, which contains a new epilogue that covers the year following the initial hardback release. As part of the promotion of the paperback, Ant performed a reading of selected passages of the book along with acoustic songs (accompanied by childhood friend Dave Pash on guitar) at the Bloomsbury Theatre, London on 24 September. A live CD of highlights of the gig, Live at the Bloomsbury was released the following year.

=== 2010–2012: Independent label and return to touring ===
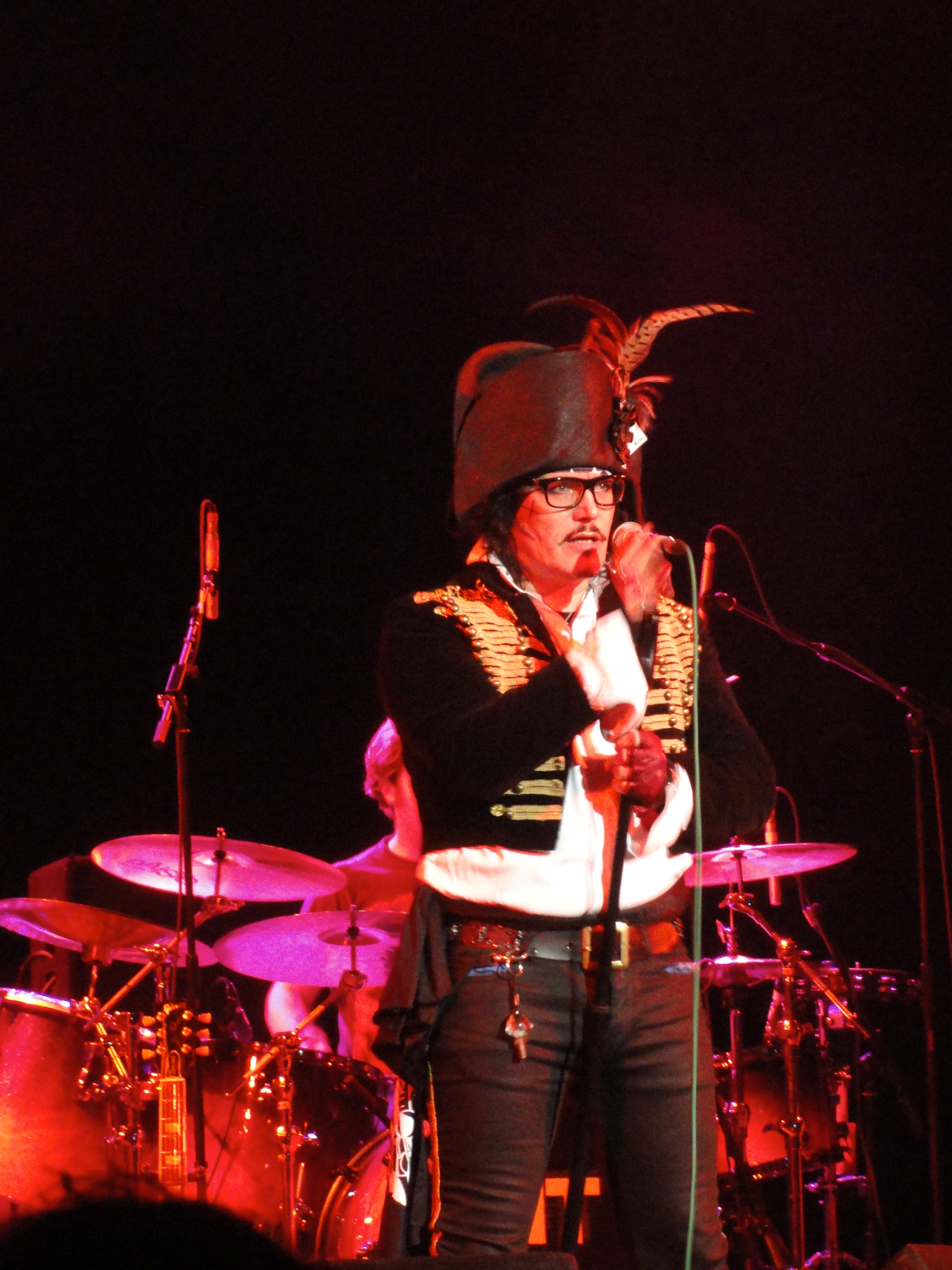
Ant performing in 2011

On 4 March 2010, Adam Ant registered his new label Blue Black Hussar Ltd. as a private limited company at Companies House. That month also marked a return to live music. Ant's first live performance since The Bloomsbury in 2007 was at Through The Looking Glass bookshop in London on 18 March, at which he played "Ants Invasion", "Cartrouble", "Physical", and a cover of Iggy Pop's "The Passenger". A day later, on 19 March, Ant guested at a Zodiac Mindwarp and the Love Reaction gig at the Pipeline Bar, London E1, in which he provided lead vocals for the band's Top 20 hit "Prime Mover". Ant performed another low key show at the Southwark Playhouse on Saturday 20 March. During the intervals Ant talked about Sony Records, how he rejected an alleged £2.6 million O2 deal, and a new album collaboration with Chris McCormack.

Ant played a sold-out headline concert, dubbed The Pirate Metal Extravaganza at the Scala in London on 30 April. He also performed some smaller guerilla gigs in Autumn 2010, which received no advance billing, including a solo show at the Dark Mills festival at London's Colour House Theatre on 4 September 2010, the launch party of the Illamasqua store on 16 September (at which Boy George served as DJ), and a guest spot at the Monster Raving Loony Party's annual conference in Fleet, Hampshire, on 25 September. On 21 October, Ant performed at the Union Chapel, London.

Ant headlined at the Scala again on 18 November, joined by a trio of female backing singers. The gig received positive reviews and three days later again topped the bill at a tribute concert for former Ant Matthew Ashman on 21 November at the same venue, in a show also featuring later Ashman bands Bow Wow Wow, Chiefs of Relief, Agent Provocateur and London rock act Slam Cartel. Ant was back playing live two days later on 23 December, when he and backing vocalist Georgina Baillee guested onstage at the Christmas party of West Rocks at Shepherds Bar in Shepherd's Bush and played live again at Proud, Camden on 5 January 2011 and at Madame Jojo's in Soho on 17 January. He finished the month by playing further dates of his World Tour of London with a two-night stand at the 100 Club on 26 and 27 January 2011.

Ant spent time in Paris where he played low-key shows (his first gigs outside the UK in nearly 16 years.). On 29 March 2011, BBC Radio 4 transmitted an interview of Ant by John Humphrys for the On the Ropes series in which Ant discussed his bipolar condition and its impact on his career. That same day, Ant held a press conference and media preview gig at Under The Bridge in Chelsea at which he formally unveiled plans for an eleven date UK concert tour (as with the Paris concert, the first such event in 16 years) due to run from 16 May to 4 June 2011. Also announced at the Chelsea event was a public screening of the December 1981 Prince Charming Revue concert video plus a question-and-answer session to be held in South London's Coronet Cinema on 11 May 2011. By the time the tour got underway on 16 May in Brighton, the original eleven date itinerary had been expanded to fifteen dates. Ant completed the schedule of tour dates which were overwhelmingly enthusiastically received.

There was one negative onstage incident at Fat Sam's in Dundee on 21 May 2011 when Ant reacted angrily to some crowd elements who booed his kilt decorated with the St George's Cross. The tour closed in Manchester on 5 June with a show at the city's Manchester Academy.

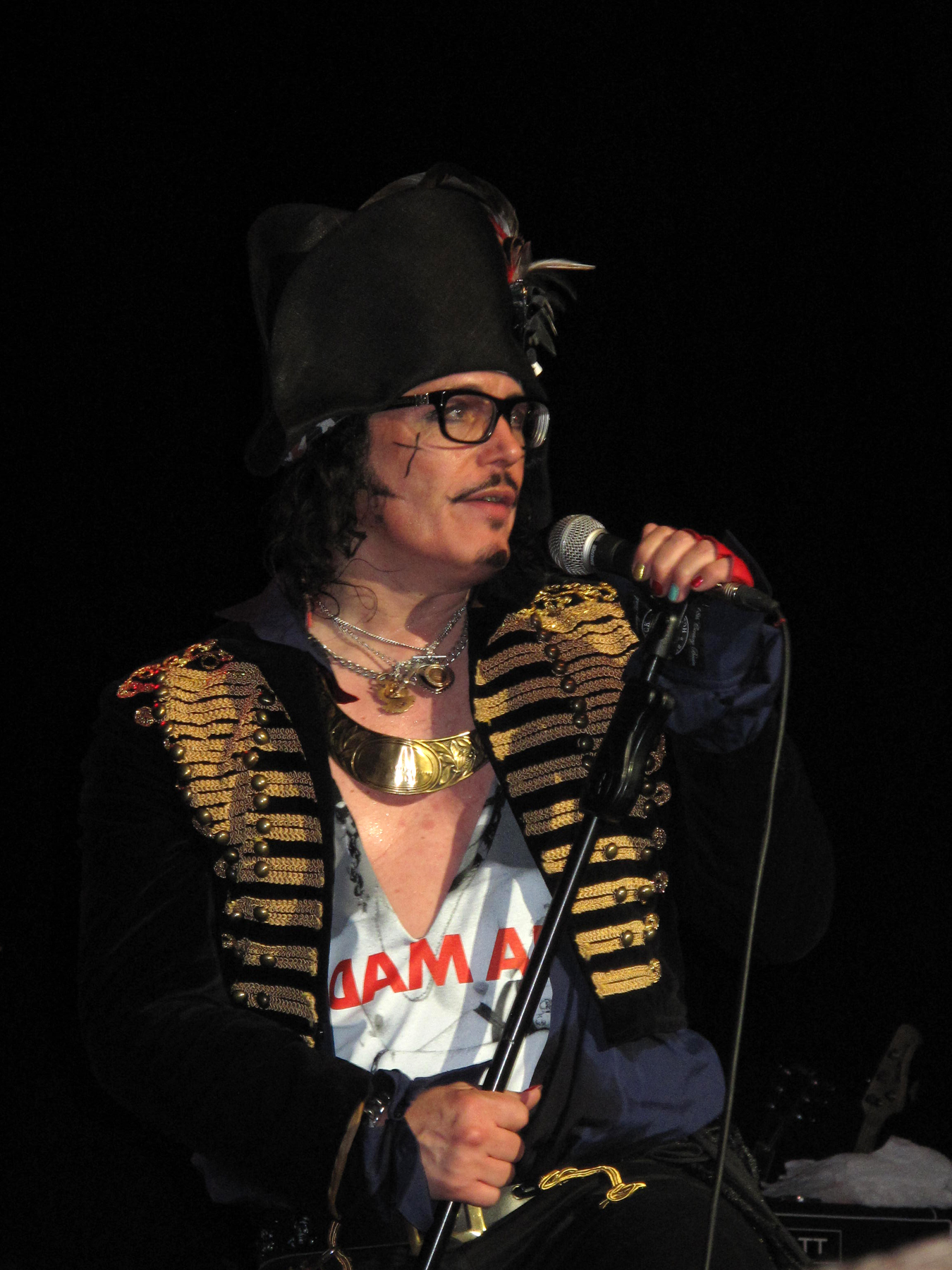
Ant performing at G-Live, Guildford, in December 2011

The Seaside Tour follow-up to the main UK tour and a warm-up to Ant's appearance at Hard Rock Calling 2011 in Hyde Park, London, on 26 June 2011, third on the bill to Rod Stewart and Stevie Nicks before an audience of 45,000. Ant later slotted in some more solo gigs, including the Soho Festival in London's Wardour Street on 11 July.

Ant also announced a follow-up UK tour (described as the "second leg" of the 2011 tour), initially scheduled to run for twelve dates from 11 November 2011 in Bristol until 13 December 2011 in Newcastle. As with the previous leg, Ant passed the time until the tour playing one-off dates, appearing with his tour band in Bedford on 10 September before three days later reuniting with 2010 band members Will Crewdson and Johnny Love for a charity show on board HMS Belfast. As with the previous tour, the itinerary was expanded from the initial 12 dates to an eventual 21 dates running from 10 November in Frome until 16 December in Norwich. Just three days after the final Norwich date of the tour, Ant was back onstage again with two members of his live band on 19 December at a charity event at Ronnie Scott's. The first record release of Ant's 2010s comeback also occurred at this point, with the release of the Sex Drugs and HIV compilation album featuring Ant's version of "Get a Grip" which had been recorded a year earlier while the World Tour of London was in progress.

A few days before the end of the second leg of his UK tour, it was officially announced that Ant would make his return to the US with a 15-date North American tour in February 2012, starting on 2 February in Ant's former adopted hometown of Los Angeles and running until 25 February in nearby Anaheim. A few days into the new year, however, it was announced that the tour was postponed until the autumn. A five-date warm-up UK mini tour for Ant and his band nonetheless went ahead for 19–24 January 2012.

An exhibition of photographs of Ant – titled Adam Ant – Dandy in the Underworld ran from 7 March 2012 to 29 April 2012 at Proud Camden in London, featuring images of Ant throughout his career, including the work of Chris Duffy, Gerard McNamara, Jill Furmanovsky, Denis O'Regan, Chris Cuffaro, Hannah Domagala, Robert Matheu, David Corio and Janette Beckman. To promote this exhibition, Ant performed a solo charity concert at the gallery on 6 March with the same two band members as the Ronnie Scott's Jazz Club concert from the previous December. The concert was well received, although an inebriated Chrissie Hynde who was in attendance, heckled throughout the performance. While this exhibition was on, Ant took his band on tour to Australia with an initial five date schedule spread over a two-week period from 23 March to 8 April, taking in Sydney, Perth, Melbourne, Adelaide and Brisbane. In mid February, Ant made a warm-up visit to Australia, including an appearance on the Adam Hills in Gordon Street Tonight show recorded on 13 February 2012 for transmission on 15 February and promotional work in Melbourne and Sydney.

Although poor ticket sales forced the cancellation of the Adelaide gig, the remaining four concerts all went ahead. The Sydney Morning Herald gave a reservedly positive review of the opening Sydney date on 23 March (which it rated three stars out of five), noting "In a set plus two encores (the first cheered for; the second not really but played anyway) comprising 30 songs, it was kind of the equivalent of throwing a lot of make-up at the mirror and seeing what stuck." Ant also made further Australian TV appearances including a return to Adam Hills in Gordon Street Tonight recorded on 26 March for transmission on 28 March, including live performances of "Stand and Deliver" and new album track "Vince Taylor" with his full band.

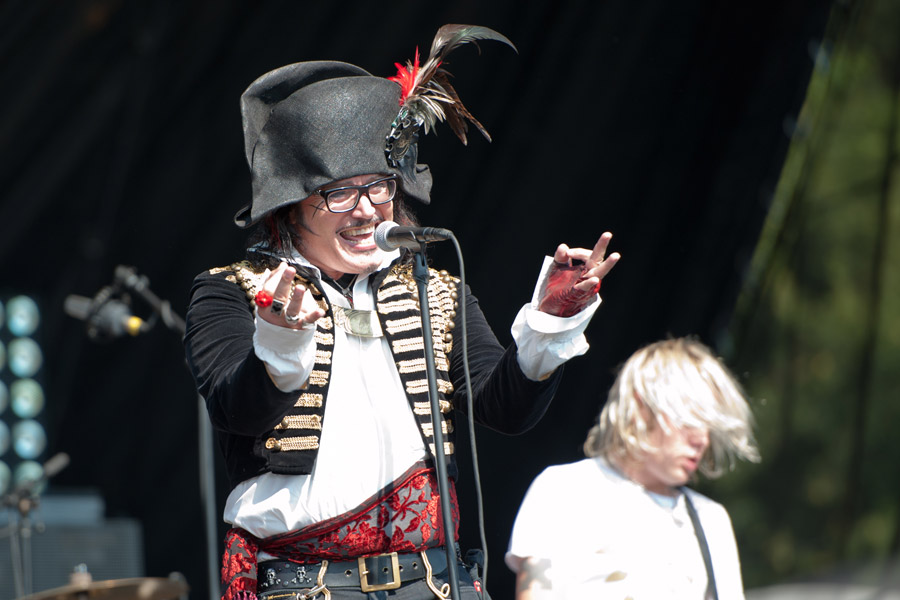
Ant performing at Music Midtown, Atlanta, in 2012

Subsequently, for the second year running, Ant was scheduled to make appearances on the summer festival circuit, interspersed with various one-off dates around the UK. This got off to an early start when Ant stepped in as replacement headliner at the Bearded Theory festival in Derby on 18 May 2012, when the Levellers had to pull out due to one of the band members being injured. Ant also played the first full band concert in continental Europe of his 2010s comeback on 24 June 2012 at the Parkpop festival in the Zuiderpark in the Hague, Netherlands, with his set broadcast on Dutch national TV. After six assorted dates around the UK in early July, Ant's next major show was a headline slot at the Silverstone Classic Festival on 21 July followed the next day by an appearance at Rewind in Perth and then at Camp Bestival on 27 July 2012.

The rest of the summer saw Ant mix festivals such as the Summer Sundae Weekender on 18 August, Solfest on 24 August and the Isle of Wight Festival with dates in such locations as Swindon, Southend-on-Sea, Warrington and Croydon. Later in the year, Ant's postponed US tour finally went ahead, commencing 13 September in Los Angeles and finishing on 20 October in nearby Anaheim. The third UK tour of the 2010s, the Blueblack Hussar Tour, commenced on 1 November in Glasgow and ran to 30 November at London's Shepherd's Bush Empire. During the tour, the first single of the new album was released – "Cool Zombie", with the formerly planned A-side "Gun in Your Pocket" now as the B-side. On New Year's Eve 2012, Ant and his full band appeared on Jools Holland's Hootenanny New Year music show, performing new album track "Vince Taylor" as well as old hits "Stand And Deliver" and "Antmusic".

=== 2013–present: Release of new album, touring ===
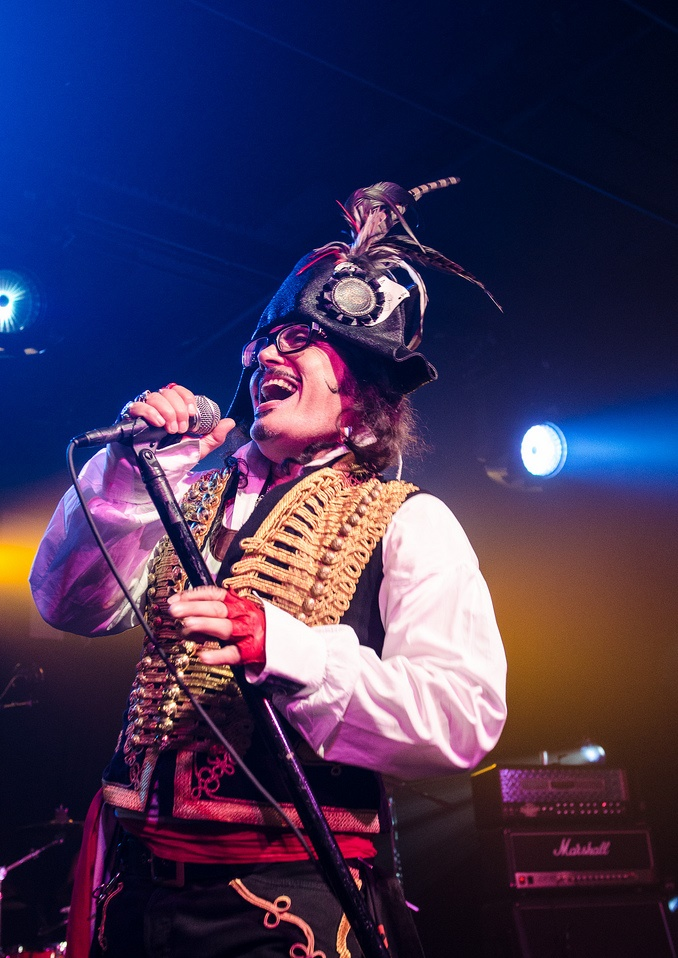
Ant performing live at the Republik in Honolulu, Hawaii, in a concert by the BAMP Project, 2013

Ant's album, the focal point of the comeback since 2010, finally received its release on 21 January 2013. Its gestation had a long history which had been running alongside the live comeback; in 2009, it was announced that Ant was planning on putting a new record out. He also expressed interest in working with The Kaiser Chiefs.

In an April 2010 interview for the NME, Ant announced he was also working on a new album, with the title Adam Ant Is the Blueblack Hussar in Marrying the Gunner's Daughter. This featured collaborations with former 3 Colours Red guitarist Chris McCormack, Ant's long-time songwriting partner Marco Pirroni, Morrissey's writing partner Boz Boorer and was also due to feature a member of Oasis (later identified as Andy Bell). According to Ant, the album is a "live record that lends itself to performance" and will feature a "kind of concept. It's a very old-fashioned, old-school, step-by-step album". He also described the album as "very autobiographical, very personal." In addition, Ant re-recorded a song in tribute to the late Sex Pistols manager Malcolm McLaren, who died earlier that month, and who also once managed Adam & The Ants. Named "Who's A Goofy Bunny Then?", the track was only previously available as a demo recorded in the early 1980s, but Ant stated he wanted to release a new version in tribute to the late punk manager. "Malcolm was a sort of mentor in my life", he said. "As close as you can get to a surrogate father". The song took its name from a term of endearment bestowed upon McLaren by Ant – referring to his "quite prominent teeth".

On 31 December 2010, Ant gave an interview for The Sun (featured in the "Something for the Weekend" segment) in which he discussed in considerable detail the various controversies surrounding his recent life and musical activities. He summed up his upcoming album thus: "The Blueblack Hussar is me coming back to life. I'm like The Terminator – I was a dead man walking". He also discussed individual songs on the album – as well as "Gun in Your Pocket" (which, aside from the Troubador live performance, had also been given a club dancefloor play by Ant himself as guest DJ at the Family Affair club night in Shoreditch, London on 24 April 2010), The interview in The Sun also made mention of "Shrink", a song about Ant's experiences in the mental healthcare system. Ant had previously discussed both of these songs in his April 2010 interview with Simon Price for online fanzine The Quietus. On his second visit to Iain Lee's show on Absolute Radio on 4 January 2011, two further new tracks were debuted, "Hard Men, Tough Blokes" and "punkyoungirl" [sic]. In an interview for Bizarre magazine published that month, Ant named the song co-written with Andy Bell as "Cool Zombie".

21 January 2013 release date was officially announced by Ant onstage at his September 2012 concert in Chatham by Ant's own record label Blueblack Hussar Records. Despite the decidedly DIY nature of the release, the album reached number 25 on the UK Albums Chart, only one place lower than its predecessor had managed when released on the corporate EMI label nearly eighteen years earlier. It had previously been at number 8 in the Midweeks. To promote the album, Ant performed a series of concerts around the British Isles during April and May (billed as a "Spring Tour") culminating in a gig at The Roundhouse on 11 May. A free concert in Rome took place on 14 June and a second full length 40 plus show US tour got underway on 17 July in San Diego and ran to 21 September in Anaheim. Prior to the tour, Ant and his band appeared on NBC's Late Night with Jimmy Fallon to promote the new album, performing a live version of the track "Vince Taylor".

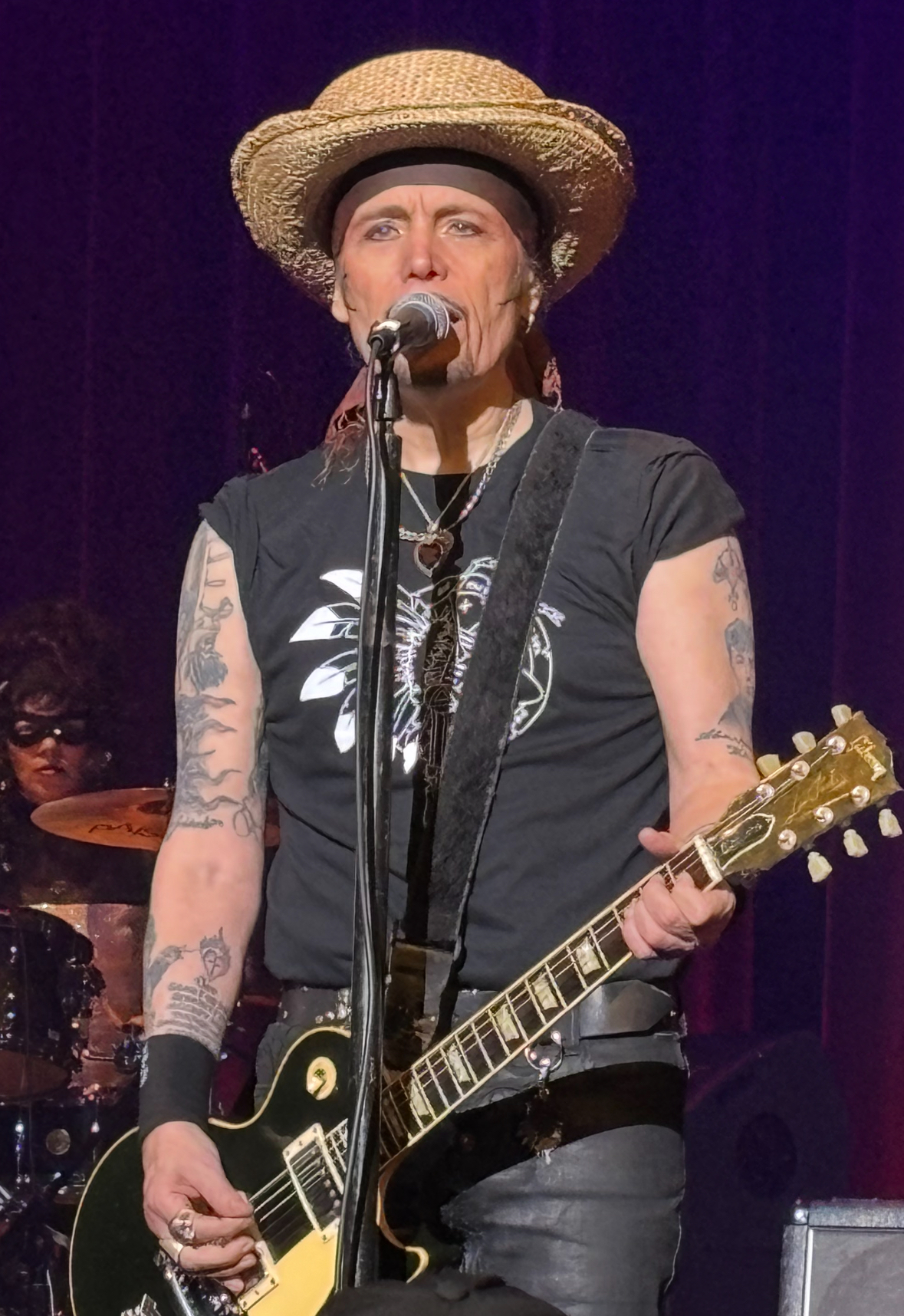
Ant performing at the State Theatre in New Brunswick, New Jersey, US, in 2024

During early 2014, Ant was at work recording his next album, titled Bravest of the Brave. On 19 April, Ant performed his debut album Dirk Wears White Sox at the Hammersmith Apollo with a band including former Ants Dave Barbe and Lee Gorman, preceding this with several UK tour dates. He also reissued the Dirk album on white vinyl on his Blueblack Hussar label, with a launch party gig at the 100 Club. Both London concerts were filmed by noted film director Leigh Tarrant and later released as the DVD album Dirk Live At The Apollo. Ant subsequently performed the full album again with his regular band for four nights at the Islington Assembly Hall in November 2014 and a full UK tour in Spring 2015.

Leigh Tarrant's film was released by Ant's own production company BlueBlack Hussar but has now been out of print since its initial release in late 2014 and remains a highly sought after concert release. This remains Ant's last professionally filmed concert to date. Further, Tarrant's originally commissioned insider documentary White Sox which captures a candid look at Ant during his Spring 2014 UK tour is currently unreleased and awaits distribution as of 2024. However, Jack Bond's documentary on Ant, The Blueblack Hussar, covering his life and performances from late 2010 to mid 2011, was released on DVD in July 2014 by Sunrise Pictures.

Ant toured the UK in 2016 and North America in early 2017, performing his Kings of the Wild Frontier album in its entirety. Sony Records issued a deluxe box set of the album linked to the UK leg of the tour, including a gold vinyl pressing of the album (as previously announced by Ant at the 100 Club gig in 2014). After his January 24, 2017 show in Boston, Ant's guitarist and music director, Tom Edwards, suddenly died due to suspected heart failure; he was 41. After cancelling shows in New York and Philadelphia, the tour continued with his other recently re-recruited guitarist Will Crewdson taking on sole guitar duties for the rest of the dates. Later the same year, he toured the UK and announced he would return to North America with another tour, titled Anthems: The Singles in the autumn, and afterwards would be taking the Kings tour to Australia and New Zealand.

Ant announced the Friend or Foe tour, which traveled North America and the United Kingdom from September to December 2019. He performed the album in its entirety in an 18-date tour in North America before returning to the United Kingdom for 26 shows. A further North American tour originally planned for April–May 2020 was shifted back to 2021 then 2022 as result of the COVID-19 pandemic. It was eventually scrapped due to the glut of rescheduled tours, but a 19-date Antics Tour of the UK did go ahead.

In 2023, Ant was scheduled to perform at the Cruel World Festival in Pasadena, California on May 20. However, shortly before the festival was to take place, Ant cancelled his appearance, due to "unforeseen circumstances". He played at the festival in 2024 and toured the United States later that year, but his Antmusic tour of the United Kingdom was postponed until the autumn of 2025 after Ant was taken ill days before the initial schedule started. The tour went ahead in late 2025 with former Jubilee co-star Toyah Willcox supporting on select dates, with the rest of the dates being supported by Yee Loi, a Liverpool-based punk rock outfit, and a compilation album entitled The Singles was also released early in the tour.

Ant headlined a "run up" show for the 2026 Rebellion Festival.

== Musical style ==
The tone of Ant's debut solo album, Friend or Foe, was defined as glitzy glam pop with "tongue-in-cheek tunes, delivered with an excess of flair and good humour". It was also described as being "one of Ant's best records and one of the best new wave albums".

In a review for Strip, the songs were considered to contain a "mixture of driving, danceable rock with humour".

The music on Vive Le Rock has been said to be a "50s-style rock & roll sound".

The fourth studio album, Manners and Physique, was said to be a combination of "contemporary dance tracks" and Ant's "old flair for mockery". Ant himself later said that the album was styled after the bass-heavy Minneapolis sound of which André Cymone, in Ant's words, was "one of the architects".

== Discography ==
=== Adam and the Ants ===
- Dirk Wears White Sox (1979)
- Kings of the Wild Frontier (1980)
- Prince Charming (1981)

=== Adam Ant ===
- Friend or Foe (1982)
- Strip (1983)
- Vive Le Rock (1985)
- Manners & Physique (1990)
- Persuasion (1992)
- Wonderful (1995)
- Adam Ant Is the Blueblack Hussar in Marrying the Gunner's Daughter (2013)

== Concert tours ==
=== Headlining ===
- Young Parisians Tour, Great Britain, January–February 1979, 15 dates including London Electric Ballroom support slot for The Lurkers
- Zerox Tour, Great Britain, July–August 1979, 17 dates plus private preview show
- Ants Invasion Tour, Great Britain May–June 1980, 15 dates plus private preview show
- Kings of the Wild Frontier Tour, Great Britain, November–December 1980, 32 dates
- Stand and Deliver Tour, worldwide, March–October 1981, 54 dates (not including April 1981 London charity show)

Individual legs:
- Stand and Deliver UK Tour, Great Britain, March 1981, six dates
- US Ants Invasion Tour, United States and Canada, April 1981, 13 dates
- Stand and Deliver European Tour, assorted Western European nations, May–June 1981, 19 dates
- Kings Of The Wild Frontier World Tour, United States, Japan and Australia, September–October 1981, 16 dates

- The Prince Charming Revue, Great Britain, December 1981 – January 1982, 25 dates at ten venues
- Friend or Foe Tour

Great Britain: Six dates, October–November 1982.
United States and Canada: 83 dates, November 1982 – May 1983.

- Strip Tour United States: 60 dates, January–April 1984.
- Vive Le Rock Tour

Spain: 1 date August 1985.
England: 3 dates (London, Manchester, Birmingham) September 1985.
United States and Canada: 34 dates, October–November 1985.

- Persuasion Tour United States and Mexico: 28 dates including preview show, February–March 1993.
- Wonderful Tour

United Kingdom and Republic of Ireland: 8 dates March 1995.
United States and Canada: 38 dates April–June 1995

- Wonderful Instore Acoustic Tour

United States: 2 dates March 1995.
Great Britain, 10 shows in 5 days (2 shows per day) April 1995

- The Good, The Mad And The Lovely Tour

United Kingdom and Republic of Ireland:

First leg: 15 dates plus preview show May–June 2011.
"Seaside Tour": five dates June 2011.
Second leg: 22 dates November–December 2011 plus three warmup dates October 2011
Third leg: five dates, January 2012.

Australia: four dates March–April 2012
United States: 20 dates September–October 2012

- Blueblack Hussar Tour

United Kingdom, Republic of Ireland, Channel Islands and Isle of Man:

First leg: 19 dates November 2012
Second leg: 12 dates April–May 2013

Netherlands and Belgium: Three dates December 2012
United States and Canada: 44 dates July–September 2013

- XII Before Dirk Tour Great Britain: five dates (reduced from scheduled titular 12) April 2014
- Dirk Wears White Sox Live Tour England: 12 dates April 2015
- Kings of the Wild Frontier Live Tour

Great Britain: 14 dates May–June plus London Christmas show December 2016
United States and Canada 17 dates January–February 2017
Australia and New Zealand: six dates October 2017

- ANThems Tour

Great Britain: 18 dates May 2017 plus London Christmas shows December 2017 (one date) and December 2018 (two dates).
United States: 14 dates September 2017. Three postponed Florida dates rescheduled for January 2018. Ten further dates July–August 2018

- Friend Or Foe Tour

United States and Canada: 18 dates, September–October 2019
Great Britain: 26 dates, November–December 2019
United States: 16 dates, April–May 2020 – postponed to 2022 due to COVID-19, cancelled due to schedule conflicts

- Antics Tour

Great Britain: 19 dates June–September 2022 – postponed from February–March 2022

- Antmusic 2024/2025

United States: 36 dates, March – May 2024
United Kingdom: 16 dates postponed from October–November 2024 to 24 dates October-November 2025 due to illness

In addition to the above, seven London concert dates between October 2010 and January 2011 were promoted as the World Tour of London. Also, seven dates in April 1978 – four in London and one each in Nottingham, Liverpool and Sheffield – were advertised on a handbill as being the "Dirk Wears White Socks Tour"

=== Opening act ===
- Squeeze Tried, Tested and Trixies tour

United States: 29 dates, August – September 2026

=== Residency ===
Marquee Club, London, England
5–26 January 1978 (four successive Thursdays)

== Acting career ==
Ant's acting career began in 1977 when he appeared in Jubilee. During the 1980s and 1990s he was living in Hollywood and pursued his acting career, taking roles in films such as Nomads, Slam Dance, Sunset Heat, and Love Bites. Ant also appeared on American television shows, including The Equalizer, Sledge Hammer!, Tales from the Crypt and Northern Exposure in which he played a rock musician.

Ant has also worked in theatre: he starred in Joe Orton's Entertaining Mr. Sloane and appeared in Funeral Games.^{: 257, 326} He produced the musical Be Bop A Lula about rock 'n' roll singers Gene Vincent and Eddie Cochran's days on tour in England, with a set designed by L.A. artist Michael Pearce.

=== TV and film ===
Year	Title	Role	Notes	Ref(s)
1977	Jubilee	Kid	Film	
1982	The Cannon and Ball Show	Himself	TV series 4, episode 4	
1983	Motown 25: Yesterday, Today, Forever	Himself	TV special	
1985	The Equalizer	DeGraumont	Episode: "The Lock Box"	
1986	Honda advertisement with Grace Jones		Advert	
1986	Nomads	Number One	Film	
1987	Amazing Stories	Ted Hellenbeck	Episode: "Such Interesting Neighbors"	
1987	Slam Dance	Jim Campbell	Film	
1987	Sledge Hammer!	Lionel Dasham	TV series 2, episode 12 "Icebreaker"	
1987	Cold Steel	Mick Duran	Film	
1988	World Gone Wild	Derek Abernathy	Film	
1988	Out of Time	Richard Marcus	Film	
1989	Spellcaster	Diablo	Film	
1989	Trust Me	James Callendar	Film	
1992	Sunset Heat	Danny Rollins	Film; also known as Midnight Heat	
1992	Tales from the Crypt	Pipkin	Episode: "Maniac at Large"	
1992	Northern Exposure	Brad Bonner	Episode: "Heroes"	
1993	Love Bites	Zachary Simms	Film	
1993	Acting on Impulse	Eric Boggs	Film	
1995	Drop Dead Rock	Dave Donovan	Film	
1995	Desert Winds	Crazy Venezuelan	Film	
1995	Cyber Bandits	Manny	Film	
1995	Batman: The Animated Series	Bert	Voice, episode: "The Lion and the Unicorn"	
1995	Lover's Knot	Marvell	Film	
1996	Face Down	Derek Fry	Film for TV	
1997	Junk		Film: short British	
1997	Never Mind The Buzzcocks	Himself	TV series 1, episode 8	
1999	La Femme Nikita	Simon Crachek	Episode: "Threshold of Pain"	
1999	The Sylvester & Tweety Mysteries	Sir Charge-A-Lot	Voice, episode: "Whatever Happened to Shorty Twang?"	
1999	Sweetwater	Todd Badham	Television film	
2003	The Madness of Prince Charming	Himself	TV documentary, Channel 4	
2013	The Blueblack Hussar	Himself	Documentary on Ant's return to music in 2010–2011, directed by Jack Bond	
2014	Never Mind the Buzzcocks	Himself	TV series 28, episode 5	

=== Theatre ===
Year	Title	Role	Notes	Ref(s)
1985	Entertaining Mr. Sloane	Sloane		^{:} ^{257}
1992	Be Bop a Lula	none	Ant was Theatrical Producer	
1993	West		Ant rehearsed the play but did not appear on stage due to a recurring knee injury.	^{:} ^{292}
1996	Funeral Games	Caulfield		^{: 326}

== Literature ==
- Ant, Adam (2007). Stand and Deliver: The Autobiography. London: Pan Books. ISBN 978-0-330-44012-7.

== Awards and nominations ==
Year	Nominated work	Award	Result
1982	Adam and the Ants	Grammy Awards: Best New Artist	Nominated
1982	Kings of the Wild Frontier	BRIT Awards: Best British Album	Won
1982	"Stand and Deliver"	Ivor Novello Awards: Songwriters of the Year Ivor Novello Award: The Best Selling "A" Side	Won
2008	Adam Ant	Q Awards: Q Icon	Won

== Personal life ==
Ant married Carol Mills in 1975, when they were both still students at Hornsey College of Art.^{:92} They divorced in 1977. He dated Amanda Donohoe between 1977 and 1981, Jamie Lee Curtis in 1983 and Heather Graham in the early 1990s. He featured a song about Vanity of Vanity 6, the female vocal group associated with Prince, on the Strip album. In 1997, Ant married Lorraine Gibson, a 25-year-old PR assistant for Vivienne Westwood. The ceremony took place in Dayton, Tennessee. The couple had a daughter. They divorced in 2002.

Ant, who does not own a television, enjoys reading, particularly historical novels. He has tattoos depicting Lord Nelson's last prayer before the Battle of Trafalgar, an image of his grandfather and a quotation from Oscar Wilde: "Experience is the name everyone gives to their mistakes."

=== Mental health issues ===
Ant has spoken candidly about his mental health issues and experiences with the effects of the illness. In 1975, when he was living with his first wife at her parents' home in Muswell Hill, he suffered from depression and became dangerously underweight. "I just didn't eat," he has said of this period, "I wasn't attempting to slim, I was attempting to kill myself." He took an overdose of pills and, after having his stomach pumped, was sent to Colney Hatch psychiatric hospital in North London; he was diagnosed as having bipolar disorder and discharged after three months. "I was totally fucked-up in the head. Things went wrong and something snapped. I just became a vegetable for three months. I couldn't talk to people. I was very ill and that was part of the reason I left college."

In 2002 Ant was poised to join the 1980s-focused Here & Now tour, but was unable to do so when he was arrested and charged, after throwing a car alternator through a window at the Prince of Wales pub in Camden and then threatening patrons with a starting pistol. Ant's court trial was held later that year at the Old Bailey in London. The charges against him, which included criminal damage and threatening members of the public, were reduced to a single count of causing affray, to which he pleaded guilty. He was fined £500 and placed under a 12-month Community Rehabilitation Order for psychiatric care, with a suspended sentence. In June 2003, it was reported that Ant had been arrested again on suspicion of criminal damage, before it was decided that he should be hospitalised for treatment.

On 18 May 2010, Ant was returned to psychiatric hospital, where he remained until mid-June, subsequently returning home under outpatient supervision. In his 31 December 2010 interview for The Sun, Ant discussed the side effects of medication for his bipolar condition: "In the past I've been a robot. It's been an out-of-body experience. Bipolar means up and down and that's me ... Music has always been the best medication. I was on sodium valproate for seven years ... . I couldn't get to sleep and I didn't make love for seven years. My hair fell out and I couldn't pick up a book as I couldn't concentrate. I didn't write a song or pick up a guitar in that time – and piled on the weight. I might as well have been dead. I work very closely with my GP and any decisions I make are made with him". During an interview with BBC Radio 6 Music, he declared that "mental health needs a great deal of attention. It's the final taboo and it needs to be faced and dealt with." Ant is involved in the Black Dog campaign, which promotes better understanding of mental illness.
