= Marco Pirroni =

British musician (born 1959)

- Born: Marco Francesco Andrea Pirroni; 27 April 1959 (age 67)
- Origin: Camden Town, North London, England
- Genres: New wave, post-punk, punk rock
- Occupation: Musician
- Years active: 1976–present

Marco Francesco Andrea Pirroni (born 27 April 1959) frequently credited simply as Marco, is a British guitarist, songwriter and record producer. He has worked with Adam Ant, Sinéad O'Connor, Siouxsie and the Banshees and many others from the late 1970s to the present day.

== Early years ==
Born to Italian parents in Camden Town, London, Pirroni made his first appearance on stage with Siouxsie and the Banshees in their debut gig, at 100 Club Punk Festival in 1976. Sid Vicious, future bassist for the Sex Pistols, was on drums. Pirroni also formed a short-lived punk rock band called the Models with future fellow Ants member Terry Lee Miall and future Wolfgang Press member Mick Allen, plus singer Cliff Fox. They recorded a Peel Session and released the single (the first of Marco's career) "Freeze"/"Man of the Year" on the Step Forward label in 1977. After his departure from The Models, Pirroni started a new project, Rema-Rema, a short-lived London punk rock group, consisting of Gary Asquith (guitar/vocals, later of Renegade Soundwave), Marco Pirroni, Michael Allen (bass/vocals), Mark Cox (keyboards) and Dorothy Prior (drums, generally known only as "Max"). The band released a four-track EP, Wheel in the Roses (released 1980 on 4AD), featured one side of studio recordings and another of live material. However, the group dissolved when Pirroni joined Adam and the Ants.

== Adam and the Ants/Adam Ant ==
Pirroni was lead guitarist and co-songwriter in the second incarnation of Adam and the Ants, co-penning two UK number one singles and a further four Top Ten hits, with Ant. The two albums he co-wrote for Adam and the Ants, Kings of the Wild Frontier and Prince Charming, both made the Top 10 in the UK Albums Chart ("Kings" number 1; "Prince Charming" number 2).

When Adam and the Ants disbanded in 1982, Pirroni was retained as Adam Ant's co-writer and studio guitarist; they produced another number-one single ("Goody Two Shoes") and an album (Friend or Foe), followed by four more Top 20 hits. Ant and Pirroni won two shared Ivor Novello Awards for "Stand and Deliver".

== The Wolfmen ==
Pirroni was a member of the Wolfmen with Chris Constantinou. They released one EP, several singles, wrote music for television advertisements and released a début album, entitled Modernity Killed Every Night. The Wolfmen released their second album, Married to the Eiffel Tower, in 2011.

== Personal life ==
After living in London's Marylebone for several years, Pirroni relocated to north Derbyshire in 2013.

== Discography ==
With Rema-Rema

- Wheel in the Roses (1980)

With Adam and the Ants

- Kings of the Wild Frontier (1980)
- Prince Charming (1981)

With Cowboys International

- Today Today (1980)

With Adam Ant

- Friend or Foe (1982)
- Strip (1983)
- Vive Le Rock (1985)
- Manners & Physique (1990)
- Persuasion (unreleased)
- Wonderful (1995)
- Adam Ant Is the Blueblack Hussar in Marrying the Gunner's Daughter (2013) - four tracks

With Sinéad O'Connor

- The Lion and the Cobra (1987)
- I Do Not Want What I Haven't Got (1990)
- Universal Mother (1994)
- How About I Be Me (And You Be You)? (2012)

With Spear of Destiny

- Outland (1987)

With The Slits

- Revenge of the Killer Slits (2006)

With The Wolfmen

- Modernity Killed Every Night (2008)
- Married to the Eiffel Tower (2011)

With Department S

- "Wonderful Day"
- "Is Vic There (Slight return)"

With Headcount

- "Lullabies For Dogs"

Preceded by Matthew Ashman	Adam and the Ants lead guitarist 1980 - 1982	Succeeded by Cha Burns
Preceded by Cha Burns	Adam Ant lead guitarist 1984 - 2010	Succeeded by Will Crewdson
