= Officers (band) =

English alternative and industrial rock band

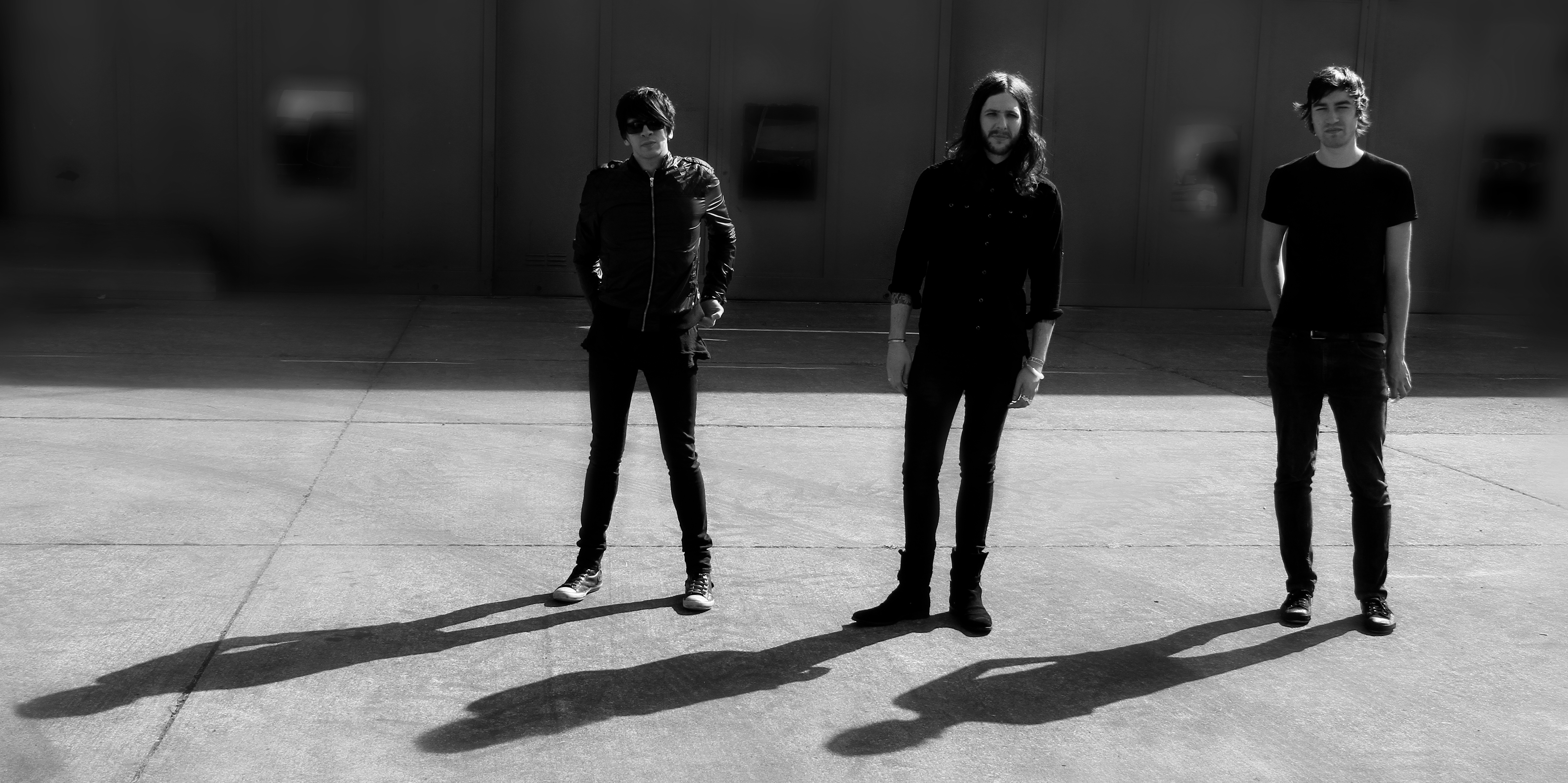
- Officers at M'era Luna Festival 2012 in Hildesheim, Germany. Left to right: Jamie Baker, Matthew Southall, Dan IV

Background information
- Origin: Leeds, York, and Manchester, England
- Genres: Indie rock, alternative rock, Industrial music, Synth-pop, Electro, Shoegaze, New Wave
- Years active: 2006–present;
- Labels: Out of Line Music, Rough Trade Records, Come Play With Me, Original Wall Of Death, Propaganda Records
- Members: Matthew Southall; Jamie Baker; Dan IV; Emily Mann; Steven Metcalfe
- Past members: Stu Drinkall; Kieran Wherrett; Matt Lunn; Paul Wilson; Matt Sladen
- Website: officersmusic.tumblr.com

Officers (commonly stylized in all caps as OFFICERS) are an English alternative and industrial rock band from Leeds, York, and Manchester.

The current lineup is Matthew Southall (vocals, programming, synthesizer), Jamie Baker (guitar), guitarist Dan IV (joined 2011), ex-Client bass player Emily Mann, and keyboard player Steven Metcalfe.

Formed in 2006, and previously called The Officers, the original lineup composed of Matthew Southall (vocals, programming, synthesizer), Jamie Baker (guitar), Kieran Wherrett (guitar), Stu Drinkall (synthesizer), and current Placebo drummer, Matt Lunn.

The band regularly collaborate with contemporary British artist Stuart Semple, who has designed album artwork, installations, and music videos with the band.

In a November 2012 interview with The Guardian, Gary Numan was asked about his involvement with Officers, and responded with, "I think they're the best new band I've heard in years and I'm very proud to be involved with them. Great music, great people. It's not often something comes along that really blows you away."

== Overview ==
In the 2008, The Officers played at the Rock Am Ring festival at Nürburgring in Germany.

As The Officers, the band released a single, "Red Chapter", in 2009 on Propaganda Records. The single was produced, mixed, and engineered by Graeme Stewart in Oxford, who is best known for his studio engineering and production work with Radiohead, and his production and recording work with Jonny Greenwood for film soundtracks, such as for the 2007 film There Will Be Blood and the 2012 film The Master.

Their debut album, On the Twelve Thrones, was released through Out of Line Music/Rough Trade Records and Original Wall of Death Recordings in 2011. The album was mixed by Dave Bascombe (Tears for Fears and Depeche Mode) and Death In Vegas’ Tim Holmes, and mastered by John Davis (Dua Lipa, Led Zeppelin, and Lana Del Rey), at Metropolis Studios. The record was produced by Matthew Southall, and engineered, edited, and recorded by Matt Sladen and the band. Matt Sladen also joined Officers' live lineup by playing synthesizers on numerous tours and shows throughout 2012. Sladen is known for his lead vocals on The Streets' UK number one single "Dry Your Eyes". The artwork for On The Twelve Thrones was produced by Stuart Semple. To promote the album, Semple and the band set up an installation within London’s Rough Trade East, which led visitors through the shop to enter a matte black shack, where they could listen to the album in a small enclosed space.

XFM and Virgin Radio DJ Eddy Temple Morris introduced Gary Numan to On The Twelve Thrones, and Numan later included the album at number 5 in his 13 favourite albums of all time in his Baker's Dozen interview for The Quietus in 2012. Numan included the song Co-Education in his BBC Radio 6 Music playlist, broadcast on 22nd December 2013. Also, in a 2017 interview with The Guardian, Numan included Co-Education in his top electro tracks, alongside songs by New Order, The Human League, and Nine Inch Nails.

In November 2011, ‘The Competition Winner’ was released as a free download on the NME website. In the supporting article, NME writer Rebecca Schiller said "To say that this song is completely soaking in dark, smoldering sex would be one hell of an understatement."

Officers later collaborated with Numan on the track "Petals" to raise awareness for the suicide prevention charity CALM (Campaign Against Living Miserably), for which Southall and Baker are official ambassadors. In an interview with The Huffington Post in 2013, Numan said working with Officers was "one of my all time favourite collaborations." Two music videos were made to support the release, and they were edited and co-directed by Jamie Baker, Stuart Semple, and Emmy award winning director Julian Jones.

The "Petals" single included remixes by Jagz Kooner (Sabres of Paradise, Primal Scream, Oasis), Ade Fenton (Gary Numan), and Losers. To support the release, Stuart Semple customized 100 7-inch EP sleeves, which included an exclusive DVD featuring behind-the-scenes footage from the Officers X Numan video shoot, as well as the broadcast and uncensored versions of the music video.

Officers also joined Numan on his Machine Music (in May and June 2012) and The Dead Moon Falling (late 2012) tours. The Machine Music tour was documented by photographer Ed Fielding.

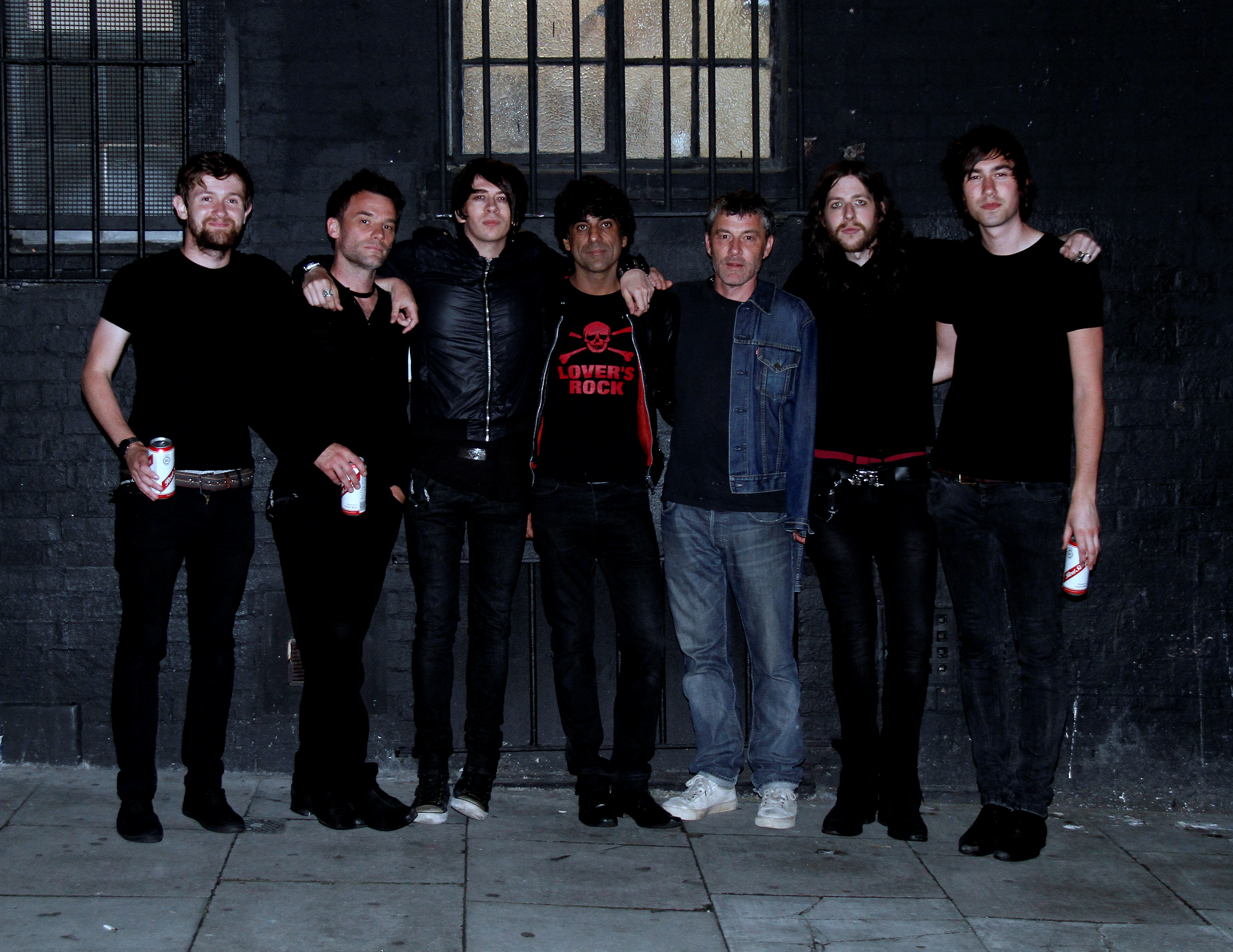
Officers outside O2 Forum Kentish Town in 2012. Left to right: Paul Wilson, Matt Sladen, Jamie Baker, Jagz Kooner, Tim Holmes, Matt Southall, and Dan IV. Photo by Mike Scanlon.

Officers remixed Gary Numan's song The Fall for his 2012 remix album, Dead Moon Falling.

In 2012, 'Counting My Guns' was used during the FYODOR GOLAN catwalk show at London Fashion Week.

In 2012, Officers played at the gothic music festival M'era Luna in Hildesheim, Germany.

In 2013, Co-Education featured in Season 1, Episode 15 of the American crime thriller television series, The Blacklist.

In March 2015, Officers organised a secret aftershow event with Placebo in Leeds, after Placebo's headline show at O2 Academy Leeds. At the event, Officers, Placebo, Jon McClure (Reverend and the Makers), and MJ (Hookworms) performed DJ sets at Leeds University to raise funds for the charity CALM, and Stuart Semple designed and produced a limited edition artwork print of Placebo's album covers to raise proceeds.

In 2015, Officers compiled and curated a companion record for Stuart Semple's 'My Sonic Youth: Ten Songs of Summer' exhibition at the Fabien Castanier Gallery in Los Angeles. In addition to tracks by Officers, the record includes tracks from Maxim (The Prodigy), Charlotte Church, Ian Pickering (Sneaker Pimps), Karima Francis, Black Moses (Jim Jones Revue), and Sam Forrest (Nine Black Alps), and was released as a limited edition vinyl LP, print, and digital download, signed and numbered by Semple. The proceeds from the vinyl sales were donated to the charity CALM (Campaign Against Living Miserably).

In 2016, Officers released "Attack", a limited edition 7-inch vinyl on Come Play With Me records, mastered by Dave Bascombe and with artwork designed by Stuart Semple. The 7-inch vinyl is a split with Leeds band Fizzy Blood. Later that year, Officers also released "Born in May", produced with Death in Vegas' Tim Holmes at Contino Rooms.

In 2017, Officers assembled a playlist for One on One music magazine. The playlist included tracks by David Bowie, Sabres Of Paradise, Gary Numan, Placebo, and Shed Seven.

In 2017, Officers released the single 'A Little Light'.

The song 'Animal' appeared on the compilation album Come Play, released by Come Play With Me records in 2017.

In 2024, Officers remixed Shed Seven's 'In Ecstasy', which is included on the bootleg edition of the UK No. 1 album Liquid Gold.

In 2025, Officers remixed Strange Pink (a band featuring Sam Forrest of Nine Black Alps) and their song, "Pencil Chewer".

== Discography ==
=== Studio albums ===
Year	Album details
2011	On the Twelve Thrones: Released: 2011; Label: Out of Line Music, Rough Trade Records, Original Wall Of Death; Format: CD, Cassette tape
