= Heartland (Client album) =

Studio album by Client
- Released: 21 March 2007
- Recorded: London and Spain
- Genre: Electroclash, synthpop
- Length: 43:46
- Label: Out of Line, SPV
- Producer: Client, Stephen Hague, Youth

Client chronology
Metropolis (2005)	Heartland (2007)	Command (2009)

Singles from Heartland
- 1. "Lights Go Out" Released: 1 December 2006; 2. "Zerox Machine" Released: 15 January 2007; 3. "Drive" Released: 23 February 2007; 4. "It's Not Over" Released: 5 October 2007

Professional ratings
Review scores
Source	Rating
Allmusic	2.5/5 stars
Blogcritics	mixed
NME	4/10
Pitchfork Media	6/10
PopMatters	5/10
Release Magazine	7/10
Rockfeedback	4/5 stars
This Is Fake DIY	2/5 stars
UR Chicago	positive

Heartland is the third studio album by English electronic music group Client, released on 21 March 2007. It is Client's only album to feature Emily Mann (known as Client E) as a member of the band. A limited edition of the album was also released in Germany, including a bonus DVD of all the group's music videos released up to that point.

== Track listing ==
No.	Title	Writer(s)	Producer(s)	Length
1.	"Heartland"	Client	Client, Joe Wilson	4:26
2.	"Drive"	Client, Martin Glover	Youth	3:58
3.	"Lights Go Out"	Client, Glover	Youth	4:12
4.	"It's Not Over"	Client, Glover	Youth	3:36
5.	"Zerox Machine"	Adam Ant	Youth	4:08
6.	"Someone to Hurt"	Client	Stephen Hague	4:31
7.	"6 in the Morning"	Client, Glover	Youth	4:32
8.	"Where's the Rock and Roll Gone"	Client	Client, Wilson	3:45
9.	"Köln"	Client	Client, Wilson	2:25
10.	"Monkey on My Back"	Client	Youth	4:13
11.	"Get Your Man"	Client	Client, Wilson	2:49
12.	"Heartland Reprise"	Client	Client, Wilson	1:11

German limited edition bonus DVD
No.	Title	Length
1.	"Drive"	3:17
2.	"Lights Go Out"	3:43
3.	"Zerox Machine"	3:24
4.	"Pornography" (featuring Carl Barât)	3:13
5.	"Radio"	3:11
6.	"In It for the Money"	3:55
7.	"Here and Now"	3:03
8.	"Rock and Roll Machine"	3:29

== The Rotherham Sessions ==

A collection of early demo versions from Heartland, titled The Rotherham Sessions, was released on 1 February 2006 as a limited edition download and CD through Client's website.

1. "Monkey on My Back" – 4:36
2. "Six in the Morning (Dirty Girl)" – 3:26
3. "Someone to Hurt" – 5:28
4. "Leave the Man to Me!" – 3:36
5. "Loosetalking" – 3:03
6. "Can't Resist You" – 3:33
7. "D.I.S.C.O." – 4:10
8. "Heartland" – 5:11

"D.I.S.C.O." appeared under the title "Northern Soul" as a B-side on the "Lights Go Out" single.

== Personnel ==
Credits adapted from the liner notes of Heartland.

=== Client ===
- Client – production (1, 8, 9, 11, 1); mixing (9)
- Client A – keyboards, programming
- Client B – vocals
- Client E – bass

=== Additional personnel ===
- Tim Bran – piano (3, 5, 7, 10); programming (2–5, 7, 10)
- Tim Burgess – vocals (8)
- Clive Goddard – engineering, mixing (2–5, 7, 10)
- Stephen Hague – production, mixing (6)
- Fabrice Lachant – photography
- Nina Lauer – badge logo
- David Nock – drums (2–5, 7, 10)
- Chuck Norman – drums (6)
- Beatrix Ong – shoes
- Corinna Samow – artwork
- Paul A. Taylor – Client logo
- Paul Tipler – mixing (1, 8, 11, 12)
- Simon Tong – guitar (3, 5, 7, 10)
- Howie Weinberg – mastering
- David Westlake – drums (1, 8, 11, 12)
- Joe Wilson – production (1, 8, 9, 11, 12)
- Youth – production (2–5, 7, 10); guitar (2, 4)

== Charts ==
Chart performance for Heartland
Chart (2007)	Peak position
UK Independent Albums (OCC)	40

== Release history ==
Country	Date	Label
Scandinavia	21 March 2007	SubSpace Communications
Germany	23 March 2007	Out of Line Music, SPV GmbH
United States	10 April 2007	Metropolis Records
France	27 April 2007	Out of Line Music, SPV GmbH
United Kingdom	30 April 2007	Loser Friendly Records
Russia	30 April 2007	Irond Records
Mexico	21 May 2007	Noiselab
Greece	7 May 2008	Undo Records
