= Cicada (British band) =

British electronic music group

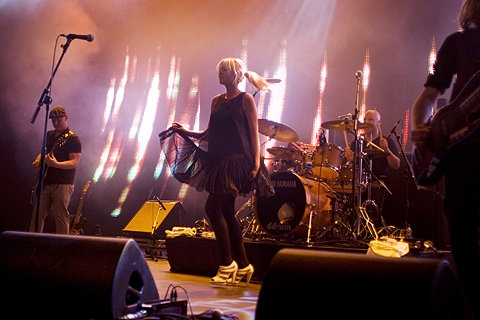

Background information
- Origin: London, England
- Genres: Electronic; house; electro-disco
- Years active: 2002–2016 (hiatus)
- Label: Critical Mass Records
- Members: Aaron Gilbert; Alex Payne
- Website: www.cicadamusic.com

Cicada are a British electronic music group. Members include producers Aaron Gilbert (a.k.a. Mr. Natural), Alex Payne and several guest vocalists including Tom Smith from Editors, Heidrun Bjornsdottir, Ben Onono, Max Berlin, Bjorn from Pacific! and most recently Fleur East, Megan Quashie, Joel Pott and Shahin Badar.

== Biography ==
They released several critically acclaimed singles throughout 2005 and 2006, including "The Things You Say" and "Cut Right Through" (both of which feature vocals by Heidrun Bjornsdottir), and "Electric Blue". They have also done remixes for Depeche Mode, New Order, Chicane, Dannii Minogue, LeAnn Rimes, Client, Blu Mar Ten, The Veronicas, and many more.

Their debut album, Cicada, was released in summer 2006 on Critical Mass Records. Their second album Roulette, was released in 2009, and included the songs "Falling Rockets" (which is used in The Big Bang Theory), "Metropolis", "Psycho Thrills" and "One Beat Away". Cicada's third album Sunburst was released in August 2011 and includes the singles "Fast Cars", "Your Love" and "Come Together". Their song "Don't Stare At the Sun" is used in a commercial for Revlon featuring Jessica Biel.

In 2012, Third Party released "Feel" with Cicada, which contains vocals from their song "Don't Stare At The Sun"

As of June 2016, Cicada are on hiatus.

== Discography ==
=== Albums and EPs ===
- 2006: Cicada
- 2009: Roulette
- 2011: Sunburst

=== Singles ===
- 2002: "Electric Blue"
- 2002: "Let Me See You"
- 2002: "Golden Blue"
- 2002: "Cut Right Through"
- 2003: "The Things You Say"
- 2006: "You Got Me Feeling"
- 2007: "Beautiful (Electric Blue)"
- 2008: "Same Old Scene"
- 2008: "Falling Rockets"
- 2009: "Metropolis"
- 2009: "Don't Stare at the Sun"
- 2009: "Psycho Thrills"
- 2010: "One Beat Away"
- 2010: "Magnetic"
- 2010: "Your Love"
- 2011: "Fast Cars"
- 2011: "Come Together"
- 2013: "Ka-Pow!"
- 2014: "Around and Around" (feat. Fleur)

=== Remixes ===
List of remixes done by Cicada for other artists
Title	Year	Artist
"One Fine Day"	2002	Jakatta
"Put the Needle on It"	2002	Dannii Minogue
"Manila"	2002	Seelenluft
"Elle et Moi"	2003	Max Berlin
"Download It"	2003	Clea
"Here and Now"	2003	Client
"The Boat"	2003	Cloak & Dagger
"Shining"	2003	Double Dee
"Mist"	2003	Freyia
"Stay"	2003	Rogue Traders
"Radio"	2004	Client
"Is It a Sin"	2004	Deepest Blue
"World in My Eyes"	2004	Depeche Mode
"Amen (Don't Be Afraid)"	2004	Flash Brothers
"Down & Out"	2004	Peter Katafalk
"When the Dawn Breaks"	2004	Narcotic Thrust
"Over Again"	2004	Odessi feat. Maria Nayler
"Drown in Me"	2004	Silencer
"Into the Fire"	2004	Thirteen Senses
"Crazy"	2005	Andy Bell
"Tell Me the Truth"	2005	The Energies
"Dance"	2005	Medcab
"Strong"	2005	LeAnn Rimes
"Everything's Gone Green"	2005	New Order
"Day Will Come" (Unreleased)	2005	Formatic
"All Sparks"	2006	Editors
"Munich"	2006	Editors
"Dangerous Power"	2006	Gabriel & Dresden feat. Jan Burton
"I Don't Know?"	2006	Chelonis R. Jones
"I Feel It"	2006	Lorraine
"Speechless"	2006	Mish Mash
"Come Tomorrow"	2007	Chicane
"Place In My Heart"	2007	David Jordan
"Anthem"	2007	Filo & Peri feat. Eric Lumiere
"Peg"	2007	Nerina Pallot
"Memorabilia"	2007	Soft Cell
"Nothing"	2007	The Egg
"Why Me, Why Now"	2008	Blu Mar Ten
"Baba O'Riley"	2008	Cube Guys
"We'll Live and Die In These Towns"	2008	The Enemy
"All I Want"	2008	Younger Brother
"Kandi"	2009	One eskimO
"Stone Cold Sober"	2009	Paloma Faith
"I Stand Alone"	2009	Plastic Inc
"Back At the Club"	2009	Pomomofo
"4ever"	2009	The Veronicas
"Suddenly"	2010	BT featuring Christian Burns
"Love You More"	2010	JLS
"I've Had Friends"	2010	Morgan Page feat. Jan Burton
"The Island"	2010	Pendulum
"A Moon Tonight"	2011	Acid Android
"Got Me Going Over"	2012	Ask2Quit
"Wish I Didn't Miss You"	2013	Electronic Youth feat. Alex Hart
"Can You Stop Me"	2013	Marsheaux
