= A Drink and a Quick Decision =

Studio album by Grand National
- Released: (United States) 11 September 2007 (Japan) 19 September 2007 (United Kingdom) 8 March 2008
- Recorded: The Way Studios
- Genres: Indietronica, post-punk, indie rock, alternative dance, new wave
- Length: 50:23
- Labels: Recall Records (US); Sunday Best (UK)
- Producers: Rupert Lyddon; Lawrence "La" Rudd

Grand National chronology
B-Sides, Remixes and Rarities (2007)	A Drink and a Quick Decision (2007)

Singles from A Drink and a Quick Decision
- 1. "Animal Sounds" Released: 25 February 2008); 2. "By the Time I Get Home There Won't Be Much of a Place for Me" Released: 21 April 2008

Professional ratings
Review scores
Source	Rating
Rockfeedback	4/5 stars
Allmusic	(not yet rated)

A Drink and a Quick Decision is the second album from British duo Grand National. The album was first released as a digital download on 18 June 2007, then released on CD and 12" vinyl 11 September 2007 in the US, and 8 March 2008 in the UK. The US edition of the album comes with the bonus track "Old Man," a Neil Young cover, a music video by Steven Compton for "Old Man" consisting mostly of the band recording the song, and an enhanced video of "By the Time I Get Home There Won't Be Much of a Place for Me." Meanwhile, the UK CD, Japanese CD, and vinyl pressings of the album come with the song "Pieces Pieces," and the UK version does not include "Old Man."

In the UK, "Animal Sounds" and "By the Time I Get Home There Won't Be Much of a Place for Me" were released as singles on 7" vinyl and digital download only.

The album takes on a darker tone than their debut Kicking the National Habit from 2004. Billboard Magazine described the album as "an indie rocker's idea of Saturday Night Fever," and Stylus Magazine described the song "Joker and Clown" as "one of 2007's best ballads." As listed on the album's sleeve, "Joker and Clown" is dedicated to Andrew Baty (1970–2007), a friend who died while the duo was recording the new album.

The title of the album is a lyric taken from the hit song "She's Gone" by Hall & Oates.

"Cut by the Brakes" contains a sample of "Mit Dir" by Robert Görl.

"Going to Switch the Lights On" is based around a sample of the title track of The J. Geils Band album Monkey Island.

== Track listing ==
=== US version ===
No.	Title	{{{extra_column}}}	Length
1.	"Reason to Hide In"		4:27
2.	"Weird Ideas at Work"		5:07
3.	"Animal Sounds"		4:34
4.	"By the Time I Get Home There Won't Be Much of a Place for Me"		3:36
5.	"Cut by the Brakes"		4:38
6.	"Tongue"		6:26
7.	"Going to Switch the Lights On"		4:35
8.	"New Space to Throw"		3:59
9.	"Joker and Clown"		3:33
10.	"Close Approximation"		4:21
11.	"Pieces Pieces"		3:54
12.	"Pack All the Things You Need"		2:44
13.	"Part of a Corner"		4:44
14.	"Old Man" (live in the studio)	bonus track	3:36
15.	"By the Time I Get Home There Won't Be Much of a Place for Me" (enhanced video)

=== UK version ===
No.	Title	Length
1.	"Reason to Hide In"	4:27
2.	"Weird Ideas at Work"	5:07
3.	"Animal Sounds"	4:34
4.	"New Space to Throw"	3:59
5.	"Cut by the Brakes"	4:38
6.	"Tongue"	6:26
7.	"Going to Switch the Lights On"	4:35
8.	"By the Time I Get Home There Won't Be Much of a Place for Me"	3:36
9.	"Joker and Clown"	3:33
10.	"Close Approximation"	4:21
11.	"Pieces Pieces"	3:54
12.	"Pack All the Things You Need"	2:44
13.	"Part of a Corner"	4:44

iTunes bonus tracks
No.	Title	Length
14.	"Rotobahn"	2:46
15.	"Old Man" (live in the studio)	3:36
