= Going Down (album) =

Remix album by Client
- Released: 2004
- Genre: Electroclash
- Length: 49:48
- Label: Toast Hawaii
- Producer: Client

Client chronology
Client (2003)	Going Down (2004)	City (2004)

Going Down is a remix album by the English electronic group Client. It was released in 2004 by Toast Hawaii as a download-only release on the band's website.

The album collected various remixes for the singles from the Client album. The remixes were culled mainly from the 12" singles released.

== Track listing ==
All songs written by Client.

1. "Price of Dub" – 3:41
2. "Price of Love" (Extended Mix) – 5:04
3. "Client" (Harder Sex Mix) – 6:22
4. "Price of Love" (Sie Medway-Smith Mix) – 4:57
5. "Rock and Roll Machine" (Extended Mix) – 5:25
6. "Rock and Roll Machine" (Sie Medway-Smith Mix) – 5:21
7. "Rock and Roll Machine" (Droyds Mix) – 6:29
8. "Here and Now" (Cicada Vocal Mix) – 7:05
9. "Here and Now" (Extended Mix) – 5:24
