= Grand National (band) =

- Origin: London, England
- Genres: Indietronica, Post-punk, Indie rock, Alternative dance, New wave
- Years active: 2003–present
- Label: Sunday Best Recordings
- Members: Rupert Lyddon; Lawrence Rudd

Grand National are a British band from London, England who have toured extensively throughout Europe and the United States. The project is a collaboration between Rupert Lyddon (born 1975, Amersham) and Lawrence Rudd (born 1976, Weston-super-Mare), who also is a DJ and remixer. Their sound is reminiscent of early forays into electronic sound manipulation, new wave and psychedelic soul. As a live act the band usually adopt a six-piece format. There is also an unrelated group by the same moniker in the U.S.

== Remixes ==
Grand National have provided remixes for Snow Patrol's track "Chocolate" from the 2003 Final Straw album and Client's "In It For The Money". Sasha reconstructed the track "Talk Amongst Yourselves" for his progressive house project that became the compilation Involver.

== Discography ==
=== Albums ===
Date	Release
24 May 2004	Kicking the National Habit
30 April 2007	B-Sides, Remixes and Rarities
18 September 2007	A Drink and a Quick Decision

=== Singles and EPs ===
Date	Release
8 December 2003	"Peanut Dreams" (a.k.a. "Grand National EP")
19 April 2004	"Talk Amongst Yourselves"
2 August 2004	"Cherry Tree"
1 November 2004	"Drink to Moving On"
29 August 2005	"Playing In The Distance"
25 February 2008	"Animal Sounds"
21 April 2008	"By the Time I Get Home There Won't Be Much of a Place for Me"
