= Zerox =

1979 single by Adam and the Ants

Single by Adam and the Ants

from the album Dirk Wears White Sox
- B-side: "Whip in My Valise"
- Released: 6 July 1979
- Genre: Post-punk; glam rock; disco-rock
- Length: 3:45
- Label: Do It Records
- Songwriter: Adam Ant
- Producer: Adam Ant

Adam and the Ants singles chronology
| "Young Parisians" (1978) | "Zerox" (1979) | "Cartrouble" (1980) |

Music video
- Zerox by Adam and the Ants on YouTube

"Zerox" (stylised as Zerøx) is an Adam and the Ants standalone single written by Adam Ant. It was later included on the 1983 CBS reissue of the band's debut album Dirk Wears White Sox and as part of the bonus material on the 2004 Columbia Records remaster. The lineup on the track includes Dave Barbarossa on drums, Matthew Ashman on guitar and Andy Warren on bass guitar, with Ant playing some percussion during the coda. The track has been included on the compilations Antics in the Forbidden Zone, Antmusic: The Very Best of Adam Ant, The Very Best of Adam and the Ants, Antbox, The Essential Adam Ant and Stand & Deliver: The Very Best of Adam & the Ants.

The cover portrays Image in Motion (1913), a photograph by the Italian futurist Anton Bragaglia, with the name of the band and the song superimposed over it.

== Lyrics ==
The title is a reference to the Xerox photocopier, used as a metaphor for plagiarism in the song's lyrics (example: I'm never bored, I'll steal your chord).

The title also references David Bowie's description of himself as "a human Xerox machine". On some early versions of the song, Ant sings "David Bowie's a Xerox machine" during the coda. In one such version, a demo recorded in August 1978 at Decca Records's Broadhurst Gardens studio, this line is sung in a high-pitched tone similar to that employed on Bowie's early single "The Laughing Gnome".

== Promotion ==
The song was performed during a John Peel session on 10 July 1978. Adam and the Ants signed with Camden-based independent record label Do It Records after leaving Decca Records. Do It had the band in the studio almost immediately after signing, with "Zerox" as the result.

The band had developed a strong cult following and embarked on a major UK tour prior to the single's release on 6 July 1979. Do It Records issued a series of music-press advertisements. A music video was partially completed in December 1979, and the surviving material, including one complete take of Ant miming the song, represented the song on the 2006 DVD compilation Stand and Deliver.

The song became a number-one hit on the UK Indie Chart but failed to chart on the UK Singles Chart upon its initial release. Following the success of the band's second album, Kings of the Wild Frontier, "Zerox" reached number 45 in January 1981 upon rerelease.

== "Whip in My Valise" ==
The B-side of the single first appeared in the Ants' set as a fast-tempo song circa August 1977. When Matthew Ashman joined the group in June 1978, it was rearranged to a slow tempo (except for the middle eight, which remained fast). This new arrangement was recorded as a demo at Decca Studios in Broadhurst Gardens, London in August 1978 and then rerecorded for the B-side at the Roundhouse session the following May. A new arrangement, at a medium-fast tempo, was unveiled at the final gig of the original Ants at the Electric Ballroom, Camden on 31 December 1979, but after this the song did not appear in Ant's live repertoire until 2010, once again using the slow arrangement.

== Different versions of the 7" single ==
Despite the fact that "Whip in My Valise" is credited as the single's B-side, 2,000 copies of the single pressed in July 1980 instead have the song "Physical" (a version later featured on The B Sides single and Antmusic EP), at the instruction of Do It Records chief Ian Tregoning, who liked this recording. His enthusiasm was not shared by Ant, who later that year rerecorded the song and released it as the B-side of his second single for CBS Records, "Dog Eat Dog", on which Ant can be heard saying, "Eat your heart out Do It! You can't do it, can ya?". When Do It finally released "Physical", scratched into the vinyl was the serial number "Dun It".

The song "Zerox" was originally entitled "I'm a Xerox Machine" and was intended as the second of two singles for Decca Records, with "Kick" as the B-side. These versions were recorded November 1978 at RAK Studios, produced by Snips. Ant planned to include the band's "Antmanifesto" as an insert with the single. For the eventual release of "Zerox", these recordings were discarded in favour of the May 1979 Roundhouse recording. A spoof Decca label for the A-side, under the title "Zerox Machine (I'm A)", was printed in the third issue of Ant fanzine Antics in the 90s in 1993.

== Client version ==
"Zerox Machine"

Single by Client

from the album Heartland
- B-side: "Loosetalking"
- Released: 15 January 2007
- Genre: Electroclash
- Length: 4:08
- Label: Loser Friendly
- Songwriter: Adam Ant
- Producer: Youth

Client singles chronology
| "Lights Go Out" (2006) | "Zerox Machine" (2007) | "Drive" (2007) |

English electronic group Client covered "Zerox" on their third studio album, Heartland (2007). Released as the album's second single, it is their first release since the band parted ways with Toast Hawaii. Client titled their version of the song "Zerox Machine".

=== Track listings ===
UK 7" single (LFS05)

A. "Zerox Machine" – 4:05
B. "Zerox Machine" (Jonny Slut/Atomizermix) – 4:43

UK 12" single (LFSX05)

A. "Zerox Machine" (N-Joi Remix) – 7:05
B. "Zerox Machine" (IDC Remix) – 5:00

U.S. CD single (MET 470)

1. "Zerox Machine"
2. "Loosetalking"
3. "Zerox Machine" (IDC Mix)
4. "Zerox Machine" (Jonny Slut/Atomizermix)
5. "Zerox Machine" (Robert Görl Strange Pistol Mix) – 3:32
6. "Zerox Machine" (Club Mix by Covenant)

German promo CD single (LTD 21)

1. "Zerox Machine" (Edit) – 4:14
2. "Zerox Machine" (Terence Fixmer Remix) – 5:33
3. "Zerox Machine" (Covenant Remix) – 4:25
4. "Zerox Machine" (Robert Görl Strange Pistol Mix) – 3:32

=== Charts ===
Chart performance for "Zerox Machine"
| Chart (2007) | Peak position |
|---|---|
| UK Singles (OCC) | 199 |
| UK Dance (Official Charts) | 17 |
| UK Indie (Official Charts) | 10 |
