= Lights Go Out =

Single by Client

from the album Heartland
- B-side: "Northern Soul"
- Released: 1 December 2006
- Genre: Electroclash
- Length: 4:12
- Label: Out of Line, SPV
- Songwriter(s): Client, Martin Glover
- Producer(s): Youth

Client singles chronology
"Pornography" (2005)	"Lights Go Out" (2006)	"Zerox Machine" (2007)

"Lights Go Out" is a song by English electronic group Client from their third studio album, Heartland. It was released in Germany in December 2006 on CD and digital download by Out of Line Music and SPV GmbH, and on 12" by Masterhit Recordings.

It is the band's first single since leaving the Toast Hawaii label and their first release not to be issued in their native United Kingdom. The song was used in a club scene in the beginning of the 2008 film The Ramen Girl, along with "Drive".

== Track listings ==
- German CD single (OUT 250, SPV CD 320513)
1. "Lights Go Out" (Radio Edit) – 3:42
2. "Northern Soul" – 5:08
3. "Lights Go Out" (Oliver Koletzki + Florian Meindl Mix) – 8:36
4. "Lights Go Out" (Basteroid Mix) – 7:03
5. "Lights Go Out" (Spetsnaz Mix) – 4:25
- German iTunes EP
1. "Lights Go Out" (Single Edit) – 3:44
2. "Northern Soul" – 5:10
3. "Lights Go Out" (Oliver Koletzki & Florian Meindl Mix) – 8:39
4. "Lights Go Out" (Basteroid Mix) – 7:05
5. "Lights Go Out" (Spetsnaz Mix) – 4:25
6. "Lights Go Out" (Boosta Mix) – 7:41
- German 12" single (HIT 006)

A1. "Lights Go Out" (Oliver Koletzki + Florian Meindl Mix) – 8:36
A2. "Zerox Machine" (Terence Fixmer Mix) – 5:33
B1. "Lights Go Out" (Basteroid Mix) – 7:03
B2. "Lights Go Out" (Boosta Mix) – 7:41

- Scandinavian digital single (ISSC 60)
1. "Lights Go Out" (Single Version) – 3:44
2. "Northern Soul" – 5:11
3. "Lights Go Out" (Unter Art Remix) – 4:08
4. "Lights Go Out" (Koletzki & Meindl Remix) – 8:38
5. "Lights Go Out" (Spetsnaz Mix) – 4:27
6. "Lights Go Out" (Basteroid Mix) – 7:05
7. "Drive" (Michael Hooker Mix) – 5:07
