= Emily Mann =

Emily Mann may refer to:

- Emily Mann (model), model with the Pineal Eye Agency
- Emily Mann (director) (born 1952), artistic director of McCarter Theatre
