= B-Sides, Remixes and Rarities =

Compilation album by Grand National
- Released: April 30, 2007
- Genre: Electronica, post-punk
- Length: 45:40
- Label: Sunday Best Records
- Producer: Rupert Lyddon; Lawrence "La" Rudd

Grand National chronology
Kicking the National Habit (2004)	B-Sides, Remixes and Rarities (2007)	A Drink and a Quick Decision (2007)

Professional ratings
Review scores
Source	Rating
Allmusic	4/5 stars

B-Sides, Remixes and Rarities is a compilation album from British dance-rock duo Grand National. The UK-only release collects all of the band's B-sides and two remixes from their Kicking the National Habit album.

== Track listing ==
No.	Title	Length
1.	"Your Rules Obey"	2:56
2.	"Sixty Seven Up"	3:52
3.	"Leaves"	4:41
4.	"Rabbit Facts"	4:41
5.	"Strange Magnificent Noise"	4:13
6.	"Lay Me Down"	3:34
7.	"Criminal"	2:50
8.	"Playing in the Distance" (Glimmmix)	8:04
9.	"Rub Your Potion"	4:05
10.	"Talk Amongst Yourselves" (Sasha Remix)	9:41
Total length:		45:40
