= Emily Mann (model) =

English model and musician

- Born: Streatham, London, England
- Known for: Model; musician
- Partner: Stuart Semple

Emily Mann is an English model and musician. Born in Streatham, London, Mann studied at the Bartlett School of Architecture. Emily signed to Oxygen Model Management and Pineal Eye Agency. In 2005 she was in the Channel 5 TV reality show Make Me A Supermodel in association with agency Select, where she worked with film makers and photographers, notably Perou and David Lam.

Mann was featured in The Nylon Book of Global Style and "100 Cool Brands" for "Buddhist Punk". She has also appeared in Vogue (Italy & UK), Vanity Fair, "FHM", "ELLE", "Cosmopolitan", "Grazia", "Telegraph Magazine", Marmalade, Dazed and i-D magazines. She was the model for Hannah Marshall's first season shot by David Lam, and modelled in Gareth Pugh's first catwalk collection.

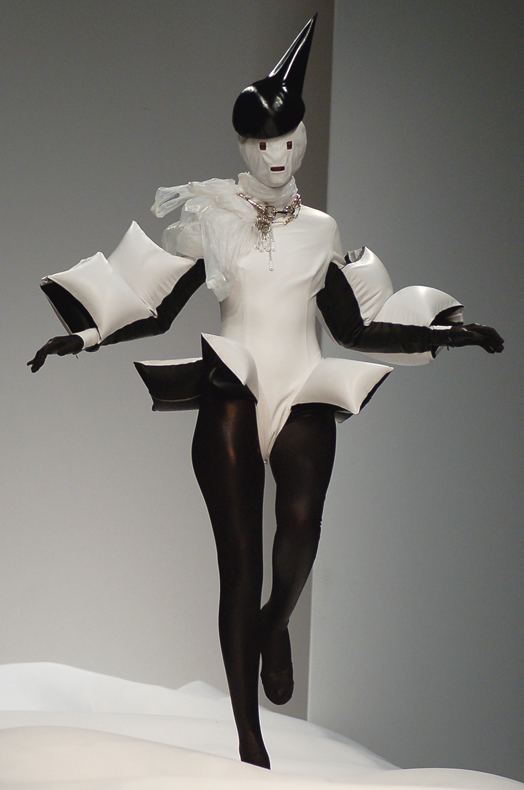
Pugh's trademark inflated clothing.

Mann appeared in adverts and for music videos including MTV, The Girls of FHM, Zongamin, Whitey and Zoot Woman. Mann was the model for the promotional image for an exhibition of the Stuckists at the Walker Art Gallery during the 2004 Liverpool Biennial. She also featured in The Belsay House art project by Mike Figgis and Boudicca.

Under the DJ name "Emily Strange", Mann was a regular DJ at Alan McGee's Death Disco, Being Boiled and Back to Nature at the Notting Hill Arts Club London, a night inspired by Fad Gadget. Emily Mann founded "Tesco Disco" with a collective of friends who curated weekly events, exhibitions and fanzine for the members venues 43 South Molton Street and Hedges & Butler.

Mann was the bassist in the group Client, in which she was known as 'Client E'. Stage performances were alongside Whitey's Scott Fairbrother, Robert Görl from D.A.F. and Sarah Blackwood. The act toured with Boys Noize, The Bloodhound Gang, Depeche Mode and Covenant and collaborated with The Libertines front men Carl Barât and Pete Doherty. Emily played on the album Heartland produced by Martin "Youth" Glover and worked with Douglas McCarthy of Nitzer Ebb on the track "Suicide Sister". On 4 September 2007, it was announced on the Client discussion forum by fellow band member, Client A, that she had left the band followed soon after by Client B.

Mann is also a member of the band, Officers. Her partner is British artist Stuart Semple, whom she is business partners with.
