= Authority (album) =

Studio album by Client
- Released: 21 March 2014
- Studio: Komplex, Bristol
- Genre: Electropop
- Length: 59:16
- Label: Out of Line
- Producer: David Francolini

Client chronology
Command (2009)	Authority (2014)

Singles from Authority
- 1. "You Can Dance" Released: 13 December 2013; 2. "Refuge" Released: 14 March 2014

Professional ratings
Review scores
Source	Rating
AllMusic	3.5/5 stars
Drunken Werewolf	Mixed
The Electricity Club	Favourable
musicOMH	3.5/5 stars
NME	7/10
Release	7/10

Authority is the fifth studio album by British electronic music group Client, released on 21 March 2014 through German electronic music label Out of Line Music.

== Background ==
After former singer Sarah Blackwood's (alias Client B) retreat from the band in December 2010, band leader Kate Holmes remained the only member of Client. The band announced that "Kate Holmes is likely to continue with the band's activities after taking a short break" and would look out for "a brand new Client to front the band."

In July 2011, Holmes introduced Xan Tyler as the new live singer of Client. Both musicians had collaborated before, forming synthpop group Technique in the late 1990s. However, since Client didn't release another album any time soon after the announcement and thus didn't go on tour, the collaboration never happened.

With the video for single "You Can Dance", released in September 2013, Holmes revealed the identity of new vocalist, Bristol-based singer/songwriter Nicole Thomas, using the alias "Client N".

== Release and promotion ==
Authority was released on CD and as digital download.

The first song of Authority to be released was "You Can Dance", for which the band issued a video in September 2013. Inspired by artist Maude Trout’s painting Death of Responsibility, the video was directed by fashion artists Vin and Omi and "reflects on the alcohol and chemical reliance associated with the dancefloor". Two months later in December 2013, the track was released as a limited edition vinyl single. The single contained album track "XXX Action" as a b-side and three remixes of the title track. Shortly before the album release in March 2014, Client followed up with single "Refuge" that also came with three remixes of the title track. The video for the single was directed by Carlos Roberti. The song is "about a lifetime of making mistakes", explained band leader Holmes, "however, when one door closes another door opens."

Client toured Germany in support of Authority in October 2014.

== Track listing ==
No.	Title	Writer(s)	Length
1.	"Authority"	Kate Holmes, David Francolini, Anthony Tombling Jr.	3:48
2.	"Design"	Holmes, Francolini, Pylon King, Tombling	4:36
3.	"XXX Action"	Holmes, Francolini	4:42
4.	"You Can Dance"	Holmes, Francolini, Tombling	4:51
5.	"The Shining Path"	Holmes, Francolini, Pylon King, Tombling	4:39
6.	"Refuge"	Holmes, Francolini, Tombling	4:25
7.	"After Effect"	Holmes, Francolini, Pylon King, Tombling	4:19
8.	"Faith"	Holmes, Francolini, Tombling	3:35
9.	"Artificial"	Holmes, Francolini	3:12
10.	"Obsession"	Holmes, Francolini, Pylon King, Tombling	5:59
11.	"Quarantine"	Holmes, Francolini, Pylon King, Tombling	6:01
12.	"Nocturnal Eyes"	Holmes, Francolini, Pylon King	9:04

== Personnel ==
=== Client ===
- Nicole Thomas (Client N) – vocals
- Kate Holmes (Client A) – keyboard

=== Technical personnel ===
- David Francolini – production, recording, mixing
- Brian Lucey – mastering
- Fabrice Lachant – photography
