= Drive (Client song) =

Single by Client

from the album Heartland
- B-side: "I'm Lost, I'm Lonely"
- Released: 23 February 2007
- Genre: Electroclash
- Length: 3:58
- Label: Out of Line, SPV
- Songwriter(s): Client, Martin Glover
- Producer(s): Youth

Client singles chronology
"Zerox Machine" (2007)	"Drive" (2007)	"It's Not Over" (2007)

"Drive" is a song by English electronic group Client, released as the third single from their third studio album, Heartland. It reached number ninety in Germany. The song was used in a club scene in the beginning of the 2008 film The Ramen Girl, along with "Lights Go Out".

== Track listings ==
- German CD single (OUT 255, SPV CD 320563)
- iTunes EP
1. "Drive" (Radio Edit) – 3:17
2. "I'm Lost, I'm Lonely" – 3:21
3. "Drive" (Lexy & K-Paul Rmx) – 6:36
4. "Drive" (Dobro Lovemix by Boosta) – 4:00
5. "Drive" (Thomas Gold Mix) – 8:23
- German CD single [2] (OUT 256, SPV CD 320560)
- iTunes EP [2]
1. "Drive" (Radio Edit) – 3:17
2. "6 in the Morning" (Nik Leman's 3am Def-Disco Mix) – 3:32
3. "Drive" (Venus Mix by Boosta) – 5:47
4. "Drive" (Eyerer & Namito Rmx) – 7:35
5. "Drive" (Housemeister 'B-B-B-Backstreet Mix') – 5:16
- German 12" single (HIT 007)

A1. "Drive" (Lexy & K-Paul Rmx)
A2. "Drive" (Michael Hooker Mix)
B1. "Drive" (Thomas Gold Dub)
B2. "Drive" (Venus Mix by Boosta)

- German 12" single [2] (HIT 008)

A1. "Drive" (Eyerer & Namito Rmx) – 7:35
A2. "Drive" (Housemeister 'B-B-B-Backstreet Mix') – 5:16
B1. "Drive" (Warboy Remix)
B2. "Drive" (Fuchs Und Horn Rmx)

- UK limited edition 12" single (LFSX06)

A1. "Drive" (Thomas Gold Mix) – 8:20
A2. "Drive" (Album Version) – 3:57
B1. "Drive" (Eyerer & Namito Rmx) – 7:31
B2. "6 in the Morning" (Nik Leman's 3am Def-Disco Mix) – 3:29

- Scandinavian iTunes single
1. "Drive" (Single Version) – 3:15
2. "I'm Lost, I'm Lonely" – 3:21
3. "Drive" (Boosta Venus Mix) – 5:47
4. "Drive" (Eyerer and Namito Remix) – 7:33
5. "Drive" (Thomas Gold Remix) – 8:24
6. "Drive" (Warboy Remix) – 6:18
7. "6 in the Morning" (Nick Leman's 3AM Def-Disco Mix) – 3:28

== Charts ==
Chart performance for "Drive"
Chart (2007)	Peak position
Germany (GfK)	90
