= Command (album) =

Studio album by Client
- Released: 4 March 2009
- Genre: Electroclash, synthpop
- Length: 36:44
- Label: Out of Line, SPV
- Producer: Toby Anderson, Client, Youth, Joe Wilson

Client chronology
Heartland (2007)	Command (2009)	Authority (2014)

Singles from Command
- 1. "Can You Feel" Released: 20 February 2009; 2. "Make Me Believe in You" Released: 28 September 2009

Professional ratings
Review scores
Source	Rating
NME	7/10
Pitchfork Media	5.2/10
PopMatters	7/10
Release Magazine	8/10

Command is the fourth studio album by English electronic music group Client, released on 4 March 2009.

== Track listing ==
No.	Title	Writer(s)	Producer(s)	Length
1.	"Your Love Is Like Petrol"	Client, Martin Glover, Toby Andersen	Youth, Andersen	3:13
2.	"Can You Feel"	Client, Glover	Youth, Andersen	4:31
3.	"Don't Run Away"	Client, Joe Wilson	Client, Wilson	3:03
4.	"Make Me Believe in You"	Curtis Mayfield	Youth, Andersen	4:19
5.	"Lullaby"	Client, Wilson	Client, Wilson	3:10
6.	"Ghosts"	Client, Glover	Youth, Andersen	4:09
7.	"Satisfaction"	Client, Wilson	Client, Wilson	3:37
8.	"Son of a Gun"	Client, Wilson	Client, Wilson	3:44
9.	"Blackheart"	Client, Glover	Youth, Andersen	3:29
10.	"In My Mind"	Client, Wilson	Client, Wilson	3:29

German limited edition bonus disc
No.	Title	Length
1.	"Can You Feel" (Jori Hulkkonen Remix)	6:32
2.	"Soldier"	2:15
3.	"Your Love Is Like Petrol" (Auto-Auto Remix)	4:07
4.	"Can You Feel" (Kindle Remix)	4:35
5.	"Can You Feel" (Liman Beijing Remix)	4:35
6.	"Can You Feel" (Video)
7.	"It's Not Over" (Video)
8.	"6 in the Morning" (Video)
9.	"Can You Feel" (Making Of)

== Personnel ==
Credits adapted from Command album liner notes.

- Client – production (3, 5, 7, 8, 10)
- Toby Andersen – engineering, mixing, production (1, 2, 4, 6, 9)
- Kindle – guitar (3, 5, 10)
- Corinna Samow – artwork
- Paul Tipler – mixing (3, 5, 7, 8, 10)
- Youth – bass, guitar, production (1, 2, 4, 6, 9)
- Joe Wilson – production (3, 5, 7, 8, 10)

== Release history ==
Country	Date	Label
Scandinavia	4 March 2009	SubSpace Communications
Germany	6 March 2009	Out of Line Music
Russia	14 April 2009	Soyuz Music, Out of Line Music
United Kingdom	15 June 2009	Out of Line Music
