= Cicada (Cicada album) =

Studio album by Cicada
- Released: 7 August 2006
- Recorded: 2002–2006
- Genre: Electropop, nu-disco
- Length: 78:39
- Label: Critical Mass
- Producer: Aaron Gilbert; Alex Payne; Heidrun Björnsdottir

Cicada chronology
Cicada (2006)	Roulette (2009)

Professional ratings
Review scores
Source	Rating
Gurn.net	10/10 stars
djdownload.com	(Favourable)

Cicada is the self-titled debut album by English electronic music group Cicada, released in the UK in August 2006. The album contained several songs that the band had released previously as 12-inch singles ("Electric Blue", "Cut Right Through", and "The Things You Say"). Upon release Cicada earned positive reviews by music critics.

== Track listing ==
1. "Edge" – 5:38
2. "You Got Me Feeling" – 5:43
3. "The Things You Say" – 5:06
4. "All About You" – 6:24
5. "Cicadas" – 4:23
6. "Electric Blue" – 4:59
7. "Tricks" – 4:55
8. "Cut Right Through" – 5:28
9. "Reprise" – 4:10
10. "I'm Waiting" – 5:49
11. "Harmonic" – 4:17
12. "Can't Be Doin With Love" – 6:55
13. "Elle Et Moi" – 14:52

"Elle Et Moi" ends at 6:44, and includes the hidden track "Golden Blue", beginning at 8:55
