= Metropolis (Client album) =

Compilation album by Client
- Released: 2 May 2005
- Genre: Electroclash
- Length: 63:27
- Label: Self-released

Client chronology
City (2004)	Metropolis (2005)	Heartland (2007)

Metropolis is a compilation album by the English electronic group Client. It was first released digitally on 2 May 2005, and was later made available on CD on 20 April 2006 exclusively at the Client Store. The album contains remixes, B-sides and rarities.

== Track listing ==
1. "Tuesday Night" – 3:33
2. "Dirty Little Secret" – 3:16
3. "Radio" (Boosta Rockanarchy Version) – 5:10
4. "Radio" (Cicada Instrumental) – 7:23
5. "Radio" (Rex the Dog Instrumental) – 5:51
6. "Pornography" (The Zip Mix) – 7:42
7. "Pornography" (The Zip Alien Sex Mix) – 7:43
8. "Pornography" (Motor Mix) – 5:55
9. "Radio" (Radio Session) – 3:55
10. "It's Rock and Roll" (Radio Session) – 4:07
11. "In it for the Money" (Radio Session) – 3:49
12. "In it for the Money" (Zip Mix Uncensored) – 5:03
