= Client (album) =

Studio album by Client
- Released: 18 August 2003
- Recorded: London
- Genres: Electroclash, synthpop
- Length: 49:28
- Label: Toast Hawaii
- Producer: Client

Client chronology
Client (2003)	Going Down (2004)

Singles from Client
- 1. "Price of Love" Released: 7 April 2003; 2. "Rock and Roll Machine" Released: 4 August 2003; 3. "Here and Now" Released: 8 December 2003

Professional ratings
Aggregate scores
Source	Rating
Metacritic	52/100
Review scores
Source	Rating
AllMusic	2/5 stars
Entertainment Weekly	B+
Pitchfork	6.0/10
Q	1.5/5 stars
Uncut	6/10
Under the Radar	3/10
URB	2.5/5 stars

Client (stylised as CLIEИT) is the self-titled debut album by English electronic music group Client. It was released on 18 August 2003 by Toast Hawaii.

== Critical reception ==
The client was met with "mixed or average" reviews from critics. At Metacritic, which assigns a weighted average rating out of 100 to reviews from mainstream publications, this release received an average score of 52 based on 8 reviews.

In a review for AllMusic, David Jeffries wrote "Client wear their cleverness on their sleeve and go out of their way to explain how dangerous they are. The lyrics are filled with attention-grabbing innuendo that sounds forced, and the music is drab and underdeveloped. The nameless women behind it all (Client A and Client B) give potential remixers plenty to work with on the inspired "Pills", but the simple melodies throughout the album wear out their welcome quickly.

== Track listing ==
Client track listing
No.	Title	Length
1.	"Client"	3:12
2.	"Rock and Roll Machine"	3:42
3.	"Price of Love"	3:52
4.	"Happy"	4:01
5.	"Diary of an 18 Year Old Boy"	4:18
6.	"Civilian"	2:30
7.	"Here and Now"	3:44
8.	"Sugar Candy Kisses"	4:17
9.	"Pills"	4:22
10.	"Leipzig"	4:29
11.	"Love All Night" (contains a reprise of "Civilian" as a hidden track after five minutes of silence)	11:08

== Personnel ==
Credits adapted from Client album liner notes.

- Client – production
- DJ Brass – photography
- Louise Downer – artwork design
- Scott Fairbrother – guitar (3, 6, 8); bass (8)
- Sie Medway-Smith – drum programming, additional programming
- Matt Nida – web design
- Mandy Parnell – mastering
- Paul.A.Taylor – logo
- Paul Tipler – mixing
- Felix Todd – backing vocals (8); vocal production (2–5, 7, 8, 11)

== Release history ==
Country	Date	Label
Germany	18 August 2003	Mute Records
Scandinavia	18 August 2003	Toast Hawaii
United Kingdom	18 August 2003	Toast Hawaii
France	19 August 2003	Labels
United States	26 August 2003	Mute Records
Canada	13 January 2004	Mute Records
