= City (Client album) =

Studio album by Client
- Released: 21 September 2004
- Genre: Electroclash, synthpop
- Length: 47:50
- Label: Toast Hawaii
- Producer: Client, Joe Wilson

Client chronology
Going Down (2004)	City (2004)	Metropolis (2005)

Singles from City
- 1. "In It for the Money" Released: 14 June 2004; 2. "Radio" Released: 20 September 2004; 3. "Pornography" Released: 10 January 2005

Professional ratings
Aggregate scores
Source	Rating
Metacritic	60/100
Review scores
Source	Rating
Allmusic	3/5 stars
Exclaim!	positive
Pitchfork Media	5.9/10
Playlouder	4/5
PopMatters	mixed
Release Magazine	7/10
Rolling Stone	2/5 stars
Slant Magazine	3.5/5 stars
Uncut	6/10
Yahoo! Music	8/10 stars

City is the second studio album by English electronic music group Client, released on 27 September 2004 by Toast Hawaii. The album features guest appearances by Carl Barât and Pete Doherty of The Libertines, as well as Martin L. Gore of Depeche Mode.

== Track listing ==
All songs written by Client.

1. "Radio" – 4:16
2. "Come On" – 4:03
3. "Overdrive" – 3:50
4. "One Day at a Time" – 4:40
5. "Cracked" – 0:49
6. "In It for the Money" – 3:35
7. "Pornography" – 4:08
8. "Down to the Underground" – 3:02
9. "The Chill of October" – 4:52
10. "Theme" – 2:25
11. "Don't Call Me Baby" – 4:04
12. "It's Rock and Roll" – 3:26
13. "Everything Must End" – 4:40

== Personnel ==
Credits adapted from City album liner notes.

- Client – production
- Carl Barât – additional vocals (7)
- Anne Carruthers – mixing assistant
- DJ Brass – photography
- Pete Doherty – additional vocals (8)
- Louise Downer – artwork design
- Scott Fairbrother – guitar (8)
- Andy Fletcher – executive producer
- Mathieu Gendreau – engineering (Client B's vocals)
- Martin L. Gore – additional vocals (3)
- Matt Nida – web design
- Mandy Parnell – mastering
- Paul Tipler – mixing
- Joe Wilson – producer (all tracks); backing vocals (12)

== Release history ==
Country	Date	Label
United States	21 September 2004	Mute Records
Canada	21 September 2004	Mute Records
Scandinavia	24 September 2004	Toast Hawaii
France	27 September 2004	Labels
Germany	27 September 2004	Mute Records
United Kingdom	24 January 2005	Toast Hawaii
