= Lorraine (band) =

Band from Bergen, Norway

Blackroom
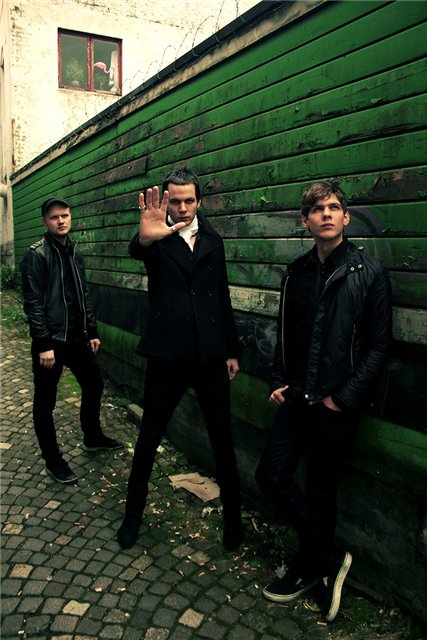

Background information
- Origin: Bergen, Norway
- Genres: Pop rock, alternative rock
- Years active: 2002–present
- Labels: Waterfall RCA
- Members: Ole Gundersen; Anders Winsents; Paal Myran Haaland
- Website: myspace.com/blackroomtheband

Blackroom, formerly known as Lorraine, are a three-piece band from Bergen, Norway, consisting of Ole Gunnar Gundersen (vocals), Anders Winsents (guitar) and Paal Myran Haaland (keyboards, programming).

== History ==
They signed to the major record label RCA Records in 2007 after parting ways with Columbia Records. The band cite their influences as Depeche Mode, a-ha, Pet Shop Boys and New Order.

In the summer of 2000, the band decided not to return to school. Paal's bedroom was traded for a workspace outside Bergen, in a decaying factory building. The units surrounding Lorraine's studio were filled with either crackheads or car mechanics. Without heating, the studio became cold, resulting in floppy discs freezing into the band's sampler. The band remained there for twelve months. The trio would record a rock song one day, a pop song the next, then a trip-hop track the day after that. Some days they would start with a lyric, others with a bassline, or a keyboard riff.

Their first releases were two 7" singles "Twenty Years Under Water" and "Lovesongs for an Ugly Girl" with a remix of Twenty Years Under Water made by Paal as a b-side. The song "Twenty Years Under Water" was put on a compilation "This is Norway". After this, in 2003, the band released their first CD - Lorraine EP featuring the new song "Echoes". These were the first Lorraine's steps.

In the same year, they were able to release their debut album. They reworked songs "Twenty Years Under Water" & "Sold Out" for the album, so their sound "grew up" and became more professional. Lorraine has been described as an electronic rock roll band. Their music is filled with plenty of references to the modern rock and electronica scene. In Norway the press have been throwing superlatives at Lorraine's first album. The Perfect Cure is produced by Bjarte Ludvigsen and is mixed by Nille Perned (The Wannadies, Bob Hund and Kent). This album was inspired by such bands as Placebo, The Cure, The Smiths, Joy Division, Prodigy and others.

Lorraine has already toured in Europe; in 2003 they have done 100 concerts in countries like France, United Kingdom, the Netherlands, Germany and Norway. In 2006, the band had a top-thirty hit in the UK with "I Feel It". They went on to tour with Pet Shop Boys.

In 2007, their song "Heaven" (EP version) was on the soundtrack of the Hollywood movie I Could Never Be Your Woman, with Michelle Pfeiffer.

In late 2008/early 2009, Lorraine changed their name to Blackroom. Blackroom was chosen because their rehearsal studio where their equipment was housed in Bergen, Norway was destroyed in a fire and they had to buy replacement equipment.

In May 2009, the band released their album Pop Noir, featuring new tracks "A Million Colors" and "Imagine This".

After releasing the album Lighthouse and a few singles from it, the band took a music pause. Ole started a new project called Subshine. Anders playing guitar for "Bloody Beach" and Paal recently made some music via his project Souldrop. Band also has some festival appearances last year, but no news on new material soon.

== Discography ==
=== Albums ===
- The Perfect Cure (Rec90 2003)
- Pop Noir (March 2009)
- Lighthouse (May 2012)

=== Extended plays ===
- Lorraine EP (Rec90 2003)
- Heaven (Columbia 23 October 2006)

=== Singles ===
- "Perfect Cure Remix" (Rec90 2003)
- "Saved / I Feel It" (September 2005 Genepool)
- "Tell Me Where You Wanna Go"
- "I Feel It" (Columbia 10 April 2006)
- "Transatlantic Flight" (Columbia 31 July 2006)
- "Saved" (Waterfall 10 December 2007)
- "When I Return to the World" (Waterfall 19 May 2008)

== Other information ==
- Winsents and Gundersen met in a guitar shop when they both started playing Stairway to Heaven at the same time. They later discovered Haaland drunk at a bus stop.
- At age 11, Winsents won the gold medal in a Scandinavian speed walking competition.
- They first began recording music in Haaland's bedroom, later moving to a decaying factory outside Bergen.
- They are now joined by a session drummer, who though not an official member of the band joins them at live shows.
- Their first record was recorded by Bjarte Ludvigsen at Tinnitus recording studio and was well received by the critics.
- Their music Heaven (EP version) is the first song of the 2007 film, I Could Never Be Your Woman, with Michelle Pfeiffer.
