= Pornography (song) =

2005 single by Client

Single by Client

from the album City
- B-side: "In the Back of Your Car"; "White Wedding"; "Tuesday Night"
- Released: 10 January 2005
- Genre: Electroclash
- Length: 4:08
- Label: Toast Hawaii
- Songwriter(s): Client; Carl Barât
- Producer(s): Client; Joe Wilson

Client singles chronology
"Radio" (2004)	"Pornography" (2005)	"Lights Go Out" (2006)

"Pornography" is a song by English electronic music group Client, released as the third single from their second studio album, City (2004). The track features guest vocals by Carl Barât, who also appears in the accompanying music video. It peaked at number 22 on the UK Singles Chart, the band's highest-peaking single to date.

== Track listings ==
- UK CD single (CDTH008)
1. "Pornography" (Radio Edit) – 3:17
2. "In the Back of Your Car" – 3:58
- UK CD single (LCDTH008)
1. "Pornography" (Extended Mix) – 5:31
2. "White Wedding" (Live at Notting Hill Arts Club) – 4:17
3. "Pornography" (Video)
- UK 7-inch single (TH008)
1. "Pornography" – 4:08
2. "Tuesday Night" – 3:39

== Charts ==
Chart performance for "Pornography"
Chart (2005)	Peak position
Scotland (OCC)	21
UK Singles (OCC)	22
