= David Hancock (artist) =

British contemporary artist, curator, and academic

- Born: 1973 (age 52–53); Manchester, England
- Education: Manchester Metropolitan University (BA, 1996); Liverpool John Moores University (MA, 2010); University of Salford (PhD, 2014)
- Known for: Painting, curation
- Notable work: Cosplay series (2013 to 2015); The Omnipotence of Dream (2024)
- Movement: Contemporary art
- Awards: Wrexham Painting Prize, Watercolour Prize (2025); BP Portrait Award, commended (2001)
- Website: david-hancock.com

David Hancock (born 1973) is a British contemporary artist, curator, and academic based in Manchester. He is a lecturer in Fine Art at the University of Salford and a director of PAPER gallery and The Fourdrinier. His work includes paintings addressing subjects including identity, subculture and cosplay.

== Early life and education ==
Hancock was born in 1973 in Manchester, England.

He studied fine art at Manchester Metropolitan University, graduating in 1996, and completed an MA in fine art at Liverpool John Moores University in 2010. He later undertook doctoral research at the University of Salford.

== Career ==
Hancock lives and works in Manchester, where he lectures in Fine Art at the University of Salford.

He is the founder and director of PAPER Gallery and co-editor of The Fourdrinier, an online contemporary art magazine.

Hancock's work gained early recognition when he was selected for the John Moores Painting Prize (1999) and the BP Portrait Award (2000 and 2001, commended in 2001). He participated in The Future Can Wait (2007 and 2008). His solo exhibitions include The English Way of Life at Wolverhampton Art Gallery (2013) and A Still Life at The Whitaker (2021).

In 2008 he curated the exhibition Faith at Manchester Museum.

== Artistic style and themes ==
Hancock works primarily in watercolour on large sheets of handmade hot-pressed paper. His paintings are framed to reveal the paper's edges and texture, emphasising its physical qualities.

His recent series focus on the cosplay subculture, portraying individuals who recreate characters from manga, video games, and anime. These works explore the space between reality and imagination, portraying both the sitter and their alter ego within the same image. The figures are often isolated against white backgrounds, reinforcing themes of fantasy, identity, and transformation.

In 2024 he curated and exhibited in The Omnipotence of Dream at Salford Museum & Art Gallery, a show reframing the legacy of Surrealism around its women and queer artists, for which he produced new work responding to pieces in the museum's collection.

== Exhibitions and collections ==
Hancock has exhibited widely across the UK and internationally, including at:

- Walker Art Gallery (John Moores Painting Prize, 1999)
- National Portrait Gallery, London (BP Portrait Award, 2000 and 2001)
- Wolverhampton Art Gallery (solo, 2013)
- The Whitaker (solo, 2021)
- Touchstones, Rochdale (solo, 2013)
- 20-21 Visual Arts Centre, Scunthorpe (solo, 2014)
- The Agency, London (solo, 2006 and 2008)
- Comme Ça Gallery, New York (solo, 2003)
- Palazzo Mora, Venice (Personal Structures, 2019)

His work is held in public collections including the Walker Art Gallery, Wolverhampton Art Gallery, Touchstones Rochdale, and Gallery Oldham.

== Selected projects ==
- Founder and Director, PAPER Gallery, Manchester
- Co-editor, The Fourdrinier online art magazine
- Curator, Faith exhibition, Manchester Museum (2008)
- Curator, The Omnipotence of Dream, Salford Museum & Art Gallery (2024)
