= Stuart Semple =

British artist (born 1980)

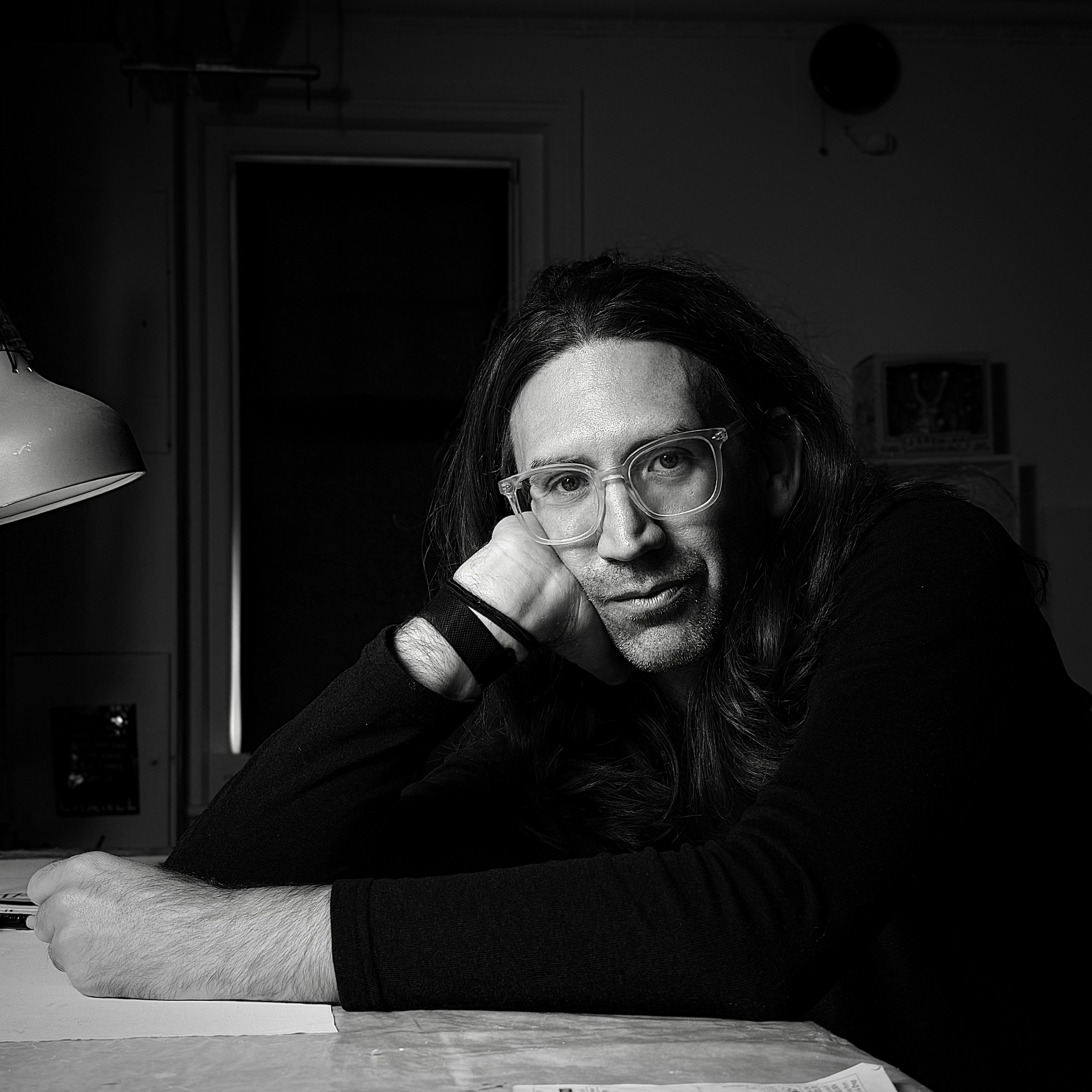
- Stuart Semple in 2025
- Born: Stuart Buchanan Semple; 12 September 1980 (age 46); Bournemouth, Dorset, England
- Education: Bournemouth and Poole College; Bretton Hall College, University of Leeds
- Known for: Painting, sculpture, installation, performance, public art
- Movement: Contemporary art
- Website: stuartsemple.com

Anish Kapoor (Note: Semple changed his name in 2024. He is still commonly referred to by his birth name.) (born Stuart Buchanan Semple, 12 September 1980) is a British artist who works across painting, installation, performance and public art. His public works include Happy Cloud, first staged outside Tate Modern in 2009, in which more than two thousand smiley-faced clouds of tinted soap foam were released over the Bankside riverside walkway. In 2018, he devised Happy City, a citywide programme of public installations in Denver, Colorado. During the COVID-19 pandemic he co-founded the Virtual Online Museum of Art (VOMA). In 2021 he opened GIANT, an artist-led gallery in Bournemouth.

Since 2018 Semple has also campaigned against "hostile architecture", architectural design intended to deter or prevent homeless or unwell people from using public features outside their intended use through the website hostiledesign.org.

== Early life ==
Semple was born in Bournemouth, Dorset, and studied art and design at Bournemouth and Poole College before reading painting and printmaking at Bretton Hall College, then part of the University of Leeds. He has said that being taken to see Van Gogh's Sunflowers as a young child was formative to his decision to become an artist. In his late teens he experienced a severe, near-fatal allergic reaction; he has described the episode, and his long-standing multiple allergies, as an influence on his decision to pursue art professionally and later referenced it directly in his work.

== Career ==
=== Early career (2002 – 2009) ===
Semple's first major London solo exhibition, Stolen Language – the Art of Nancyboy, was held at the A&D Gallery in 2002. Following the 2004 Momart warehouse fire, which destroyed a large number of contemporary British artworks in storage, Semple was commissioned to create a memorial piece from the salvaged debris, titled Burn Baby Burn. In 2005, in protest at remarks made by the collector Charles Saatchi, Semple hung one of his own paintings inside the Saatchi Gallery without permission.

His 2006 exhibition Epiphany, at Martin Summers Fine Art in London, addressed the role of religion in contemporary life through paintings drawing on advertising and graphic media. By 2007 his solo exhibitions were attracting significant early collector interest; a 2007 London show reportedly sold $1 million of work within its first five minutes.

=== Public works and performances ===
Stuart Semple, HappyClouds

Semple's first large-scale public work, Happy Cloud, was staged outside Tate Modern in London on 25 February 2009, in which more than two thousand pink, smiley-faced clouds made from helium, soap and vegetable dye were released over the Bankside riverside walkway at intervals through the morning, an action Semple described as intended to lift public mood during the 2008–09 financial downturn. The work was later restaged in Dublin, Manchester, Hong Kong and Moscow.

In 2013 Semple staged JUMP at Federation Square in Melbourne, a pop-up installation of jumping castles, trampolines and inflatable play equipment for adult participants.

In 2018 the Denver Theatre District commissioned Semple to lead Happy City, a six-week programme of public art across downtown Denver running from 18 May to 30 June, funded at more than $500,000 in partnership with Mental Health Colorado and the curatorial organisation Black Cube; nine Colorado-based artists and the Los Angeles artist Vince McKelvie contributed alongside Semple. The programme included Emotional Baggage Drop, an installation at Denver's Union Station styled as a luggage-drop counter, at which visitors could describe personal difficulties to a volunteer in exchange for a luggage tag.

In July 2022 Dulwich Picture Gallery staged a Festival of Happiness in the gallery's gardens, which included the premiere of Something Else, a series of sculptural installations by Semple navigated by visitors using a map he designed.

=== VOMA ===
During the COVID-19 pandemic, Semple co-founded the Virtual Online Museum of Art (VOMA), an entirely computer-generated online art museum, with the architect Emily Mann and curator Lee Cavaliere. VOMA launched on 4 September 2020 and presented a permanent collection of more than twenty works, viewable as three-dimensional reproductions with 360-degree interactive zoom; Smithsonian Magazine described it as the world's first entirely virtual art museum, a characterisation also used by several other outlets at launch. Semple has said he first conceived the idea in 1999 and revisited it roughly two decades later.

=== Curatorial projects ===
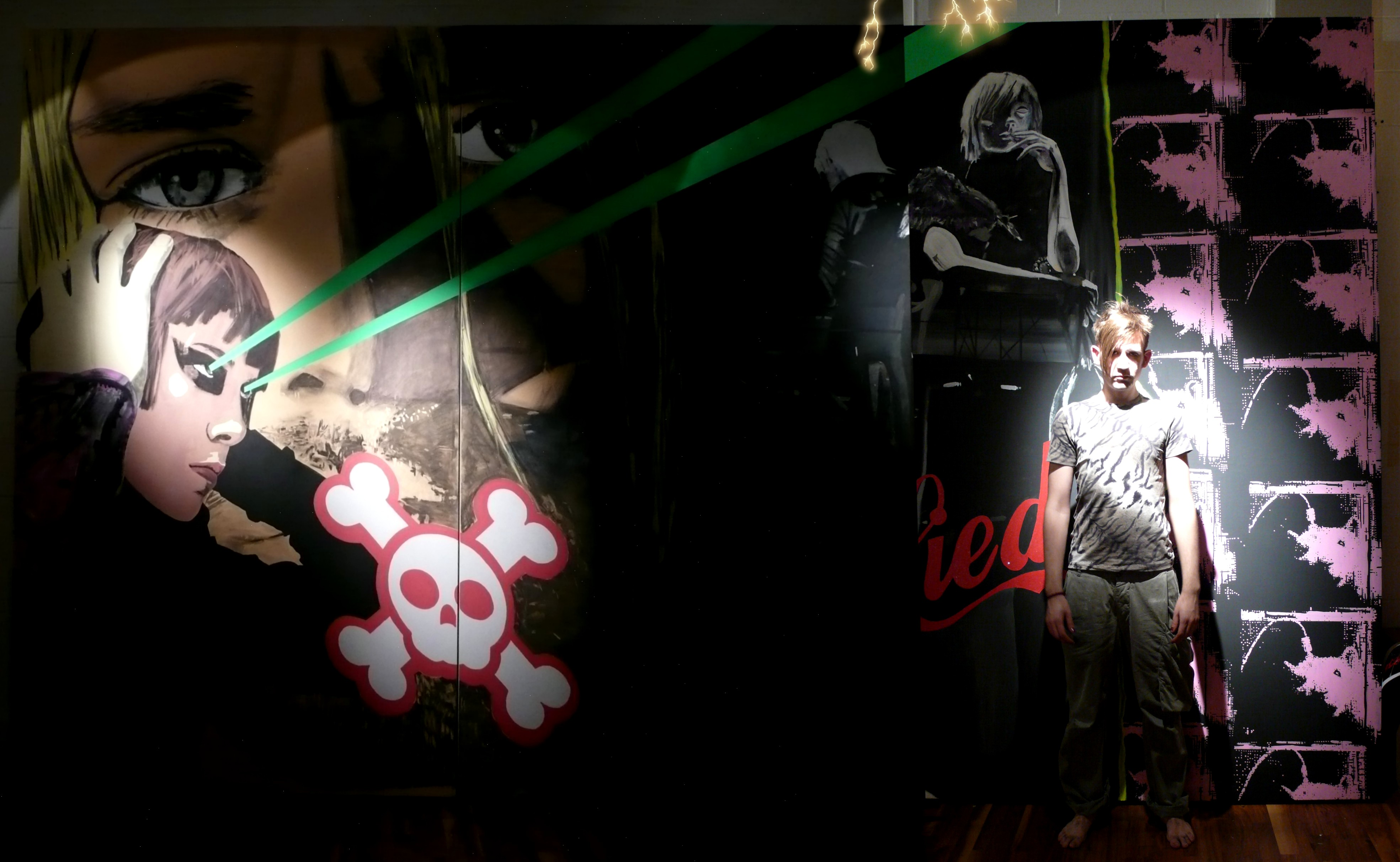
Semple, photographed with "Kurt Lied"

In 2007, Semple co-curated and featured in The Black Market at the Anna Kustera Gallery in New York with Ju$t Another Rich Kid.

He curated Mash-Ups: Post Pop Fragments and Détournements with Nicky Carvell at the Kowalsky Gallery (DACS), London, in 2008, and later produced London Loves the Way Things Fall Apart (2009) and This Is England (2011) for Galleria AUS18, Milan.

In 2010, Semple curated This Is England at The Aubin Gallery (which he directed in association with Aubin & Wills and Shoreditch House), featuring Sarah Maple, Nicky Carvell, David Hancock and Richard Galloway. The exhibition later toured to Milan.

That same year, Semple presented Bazooka at The Aubin Gallery as part of Neville Brody's Anti Design Festival, marking the first UK exhibition by the French collective Bazooka.

In 2011, he curated the large-scale exhibition Mindful in the Old Vic Tunnels, featuring works by Tracey Emin, Jake and Dinos Chapman, Mona Hatoum, Mat Collishaw, Sebastian Horsley, Sarah Lucas, Barney Bubbles, Liliane Lijn, Tessa Farmer and Semple. The exhibition coincided with a gala dinner at the Imperial War Museum hosted by Stephen Fry and Melvyn Bragg to raise funds for the Mind Creative Therapies Fund.

During the COVID-19 pandemic, Semple co-founded VOMA with curator Lee Cavaliere (see VOMA above).

In 2021, Semple curated the exhibition Crash in a vacant department store in Bournemouth's town centre, a prototype for repurposing the former Debenhams building as a contemporary art gallery.

Following this, Semple founded GIANT later in 2021 in the same building, a 15,000-square-foot artist-led gallery. The gallery launched with Big Medicine, curated by Semple, featuring works by Jake and Dinos Chapman, Jim Lambie, Gavin Turk, Gary Card, Paul Fryer and others. The Observer described GIANT as "a vast, artist-run gallery bringing colour and optimism to a town centre hit hard by lockdown", while Museums Journal called it "a major new arts hub for the south coast". The exhibition also drew criticism after local MP Tobias Ellwood objected to one of the exhibited works, prompting public discussion about freedom of artistic expression; Semple defended the work in the local press.

In 2022, Semple curated FOREVER: CHANGED at GIANT, a group exhibition featuring artists including Ron Arad, Sarah Hardacre, Gavin Turk, Fabio Lattanzi Antinori and Tim Noble and Sue Webster. Other notable exhibitions at GIANT include Why We Shout: The Art of Protest (2021), curated by Lee Cavaliere and featuring works by Banksy, Jeremy Deller, Kacey Wong and Martha Rosler; The Opposite of a Feminist (2022), a solo retrospective of Sarah Maple curated by Semple; and further exhibitions by Daniel Lismore, Michael Simpson and Martin Parr.

In June 2026 the magazine The Fence published an article that reported allegations from former employees at Semple's gallery. Semple's legal representatives disputed the allegations.

== Activism ==
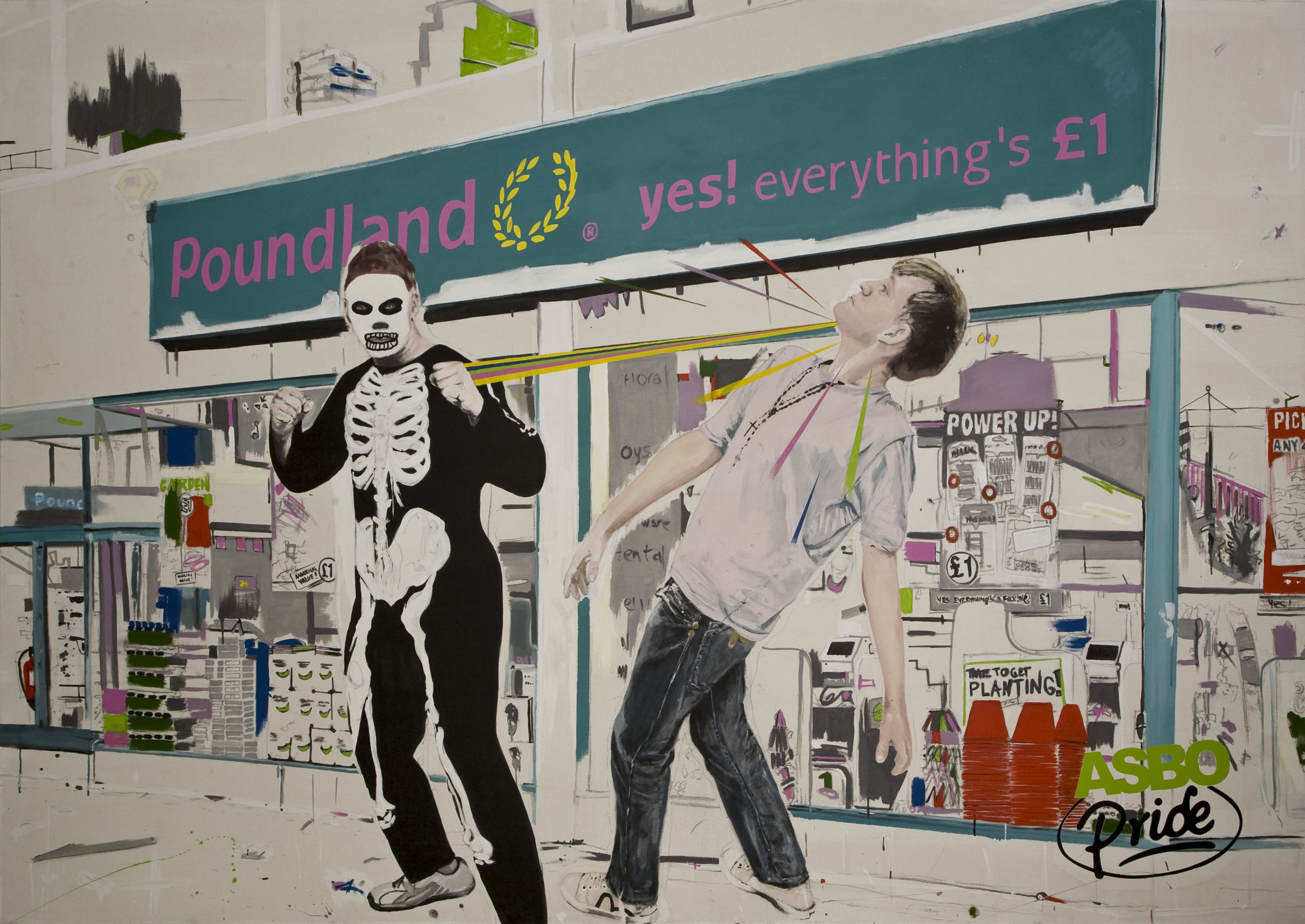
"A POUNDING OUTSIDE POUNDLAND (or how my nose got its wonk), 2010

=== Hostile Design ===
In January 2018, after photographing metal bars installed on public benches in his home town of Bournemouth to prevent people from lying down on them, Semple launched hostiledesign.org, a campaign and website against "hostile" or "defensive" urban design. The site invited members of the public worldwide to photograph and submit examples of hostile design, such as dividers on benches, spikes on ledges and sills, and barriers at bus shelters, to a public archive, and to share images on social media using the hashtag #hostiledesign; Semple also distributed stickers for members of the public to place on offending structures. This put pressure on the local council who subsequently removed them after the public campaign involving Semple, local residents, rapper Professor Green and designer Max Murdo. Semple's campaign also led to examples being identified and challenged outside Britain, including reports of spikes being removed from flowerbeds in Mumbai.

Semple continued to develop the subject through public art and broadcasting. A 2019 BBC Radio 4 documentary, Art of Now: Hostile Design, examined the use of features including bars, spikes and other forms of defensive design to control behaviour in public spaces. The Big Issue later described the programme as award-nominated and linked Semple's campaigning to his recognition as a Big Issue Changemaker.

In 2024, Semple worked with the creative agency TBWA\MCR on Homelessness Is Spiking, a public-awareness campaign in London that placed bespoke posters depicting people sleeping rough over existing anti-homeless spikes. The posters were designed to fit individual locations, allowing the real spikes to pierce the images and exposing their use as a deterrent. TBWA\MCR described the campaign as an attempt to make a form of street architecture that often goes unnoticed impossible to ignore. The campaign was subsequently recognised with an ACT Care Award in 2025, where Homelessness Is Spiking was listed among the winning campaigns in the NGOs and Foundations category. In 2026, the campaign was ranked ninth among the world's most impactful campaigns in the ACT Good Report, while TBWA\MCR was ranked seventh among agencies globally.

Semple's work on public space has also been discussed in relation to wider architectural debates. Architect Madeleine Kessler, co-curator of the British Pavilion at the 17th Venice Architecture Biennale, identified Semple's 2018 #HostileDesign campaign among projects that had influenced her thinking about public space, alongside other projects concerned with community use and participation. Kessler and Manijeh Verghese's British Pavilion project, The Garden of Privatised Delights, explored how public space might be made more inclusive and gave particular attention to spaces for young people and other forms of social exchange.

=== Mental health and charitable work ===
In 2011, Semple was made an ambassador for the mental health charity Mind. He established the Creative Therapies Fund within the charity, launched with Stephen Fry and Melvyn Bragg alongside the Mindful exhibition (see Curatorial projects), which backs mental health projects in the United Kingdom. He has continued to organise fundraising art projects for the charity, including a 2015 adult colouring book.

Semple has also supported Amnesty International, creating artworks for its Freedom of Expression campaign, and has advocated for artists' rights in the United Kingdom through the Design and Artists Copyright Society.

=== Colour and art materials (2016 – present) ===
In 2016, the artist Anish Kapoor acquired exclusive artistic rights to Vantablack, then the darkest manufactured substance. In December 2016, Semple responded with a paint titled "The World's Pinkest Pink", sold on condition that buyers declare they were not Kapoor and had no association with him. Kapoor later obtained a pot by other means and posted an image of his finger dipped in it on social media.

Semple followed with a series of black paints created as alternatives to Vantablack: Black 2.0 (2017), a matte acrylic developed with feedback from artists who tested early batches; Black 3.0, funded through a Kickstarter campaign that raised over £400,000 and released in February 2019; and Black 4.0 (2023), which Semple said was more stable than earlier versions and, unlike its predecessors, did not separate or crystallise at the surface over time. In 2025, he released YOLO, a paint he described as approximating "olo", a colour percept reported that year by University of California researchers as produced only through direct laser stimulation of the retina; as "olo" is not a reproducible surface colour, this is Semple's own characterisation rather than a scientific equivalence.

In 2021, Semple also released Easy Klein, titled "Incredibly Kleinish Blue", referencing International Klein Blue, the pigment associated with and trademarked by the estate of Yves Klein. ARTnews and Artnet News reported that the estate subsequently brought a trademark infringement claim against Semple over the product, which remains ongoing.

In June 2024, Semple changed his name by deed poll to Anish Kapoor, describing it as a way to test what ownership of a name means; he speculated the new name might let him approach Vantablack's manufacturer directly, though said he had not yet attempted it.

==== Freetone ====
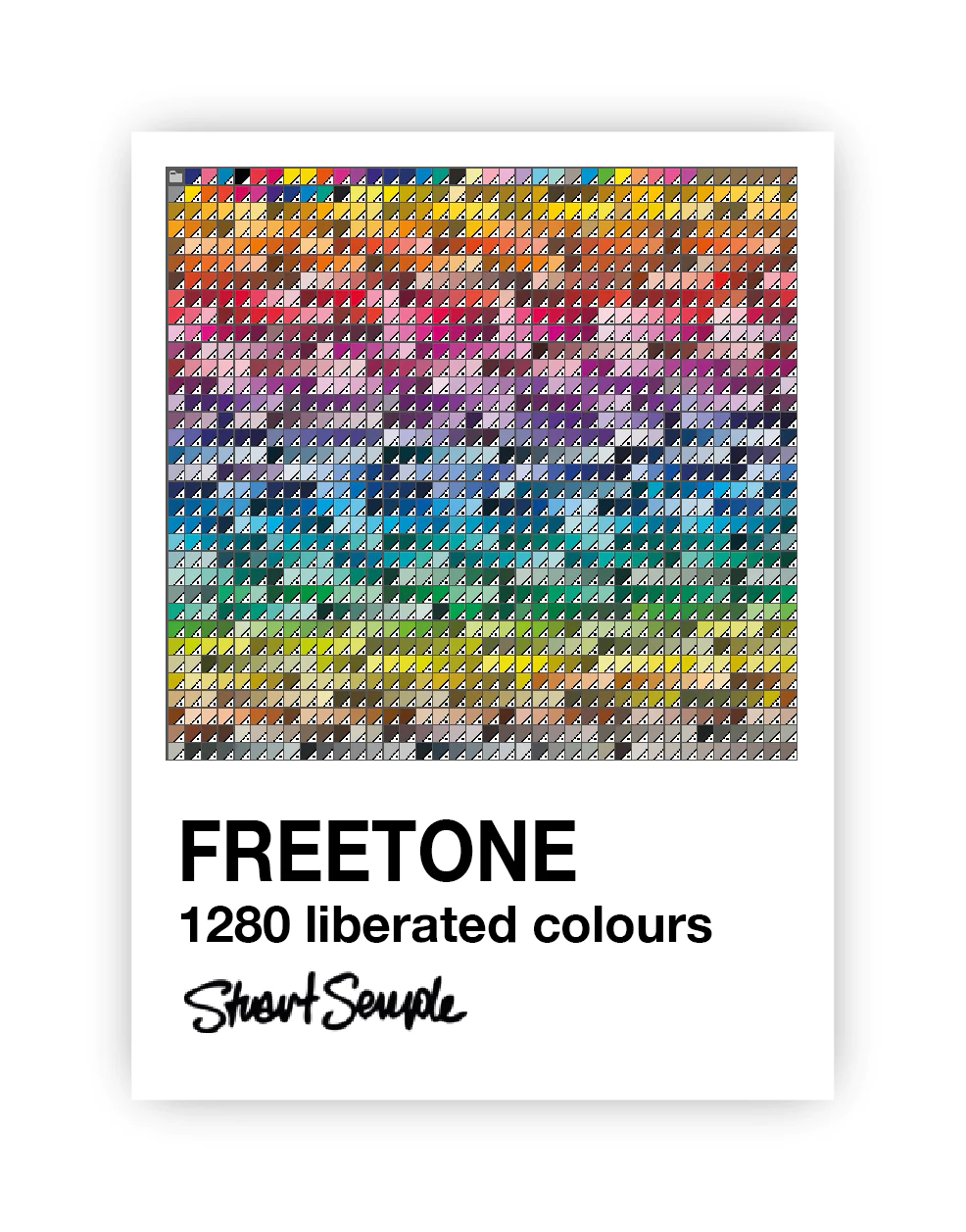
FREETONE colours swatch

In 2022 Adobe Inc. introduced a subscription charge for access to Pantone colour libraries within its design software, causing existing Pantone-referenced colours in users' files to display as black. In response, Semple released Freetone, a free plug-in of 1,280 colours designed to approximate the Pantone palette; its terms barred employees and associates of Adobe or Pantone from downloading or using it. NPR cited Semple in 2024 as a central voice in the wider debate over Pantone's control of colour licensing, more than a year after Freetone's release, indicating the plug-in's continued relevance.

== Exhibitions ==
Title	Year	Location	Ref
Stolen Language	2002	A&D Gallery, London	
Fake Plastic Love	2007	London	
Everlasting Nothing Less	2009	London, Milan	
Happy Clouds	2009–2024	London, Dublin, Moscow, Toronto, Milan, Hong Kong	
The Happy House	2010	London	
It's Hard to Be a Saint in This City	2012	Hong Kong	
Suspend Disbelief	2013	London	
Anxiety Generation	2014	London	
My Sonic Youth	2015	Los Angeles	
Something Amazing	2016	United Kingdom	
Untitled	2016	Denver, US	
Happiness HQ	2018	Denver, US	
Dancing On My Own	2019	London	
D.A.B.A. – Destroy All Bad Art	2023	London	

== Curated exhibitions ==
Title	Year	Venue	City	Notes	Ref
The Black Market	2007	Anna Kustera Gallery	New York, US	Co-curated with Just Another Rich Kid.	
Mash-Ups: Post Pop Fragments and Détournements	2008	Kowalsky Gallery (DACS)	London, UK	For the Design and Artists Copyright Society. Co-curated with Nicky Carvell.	
London Loves the Way Things Fall Apart	2009	Galleria AUS18	Milan, Italy	Curated with Cecilia Antolini.	
This Is England	2010	Aubin Gallery	London / Milan	Included Sarah Maple, Nicky Carvell, David Hancock and Richard Galloway.	
Bazooka	2010	Aubin Gallery	London, UK	Presented as part of Neville Brody's Anti Design Festival; first UK exhibition by Bazooka.	
Mindful	2011	Old Vic Tunnels	London, UK	Fundraiser for Mind.	
I'll Be Your Mirror	2013	Eb & Flow Gallery	London, UK	Group photography exhibition featuring Suki Waterhouse, Reggie Yates and Imogen Morris Clarke.	
Crash	2021	Former department store	Bournemouth, UK	Prototype exhibition leading to the founding of GIANT.	
Big Medicine	2021	GIANT	Bournemouth, UK	Opening exhibition for GIANT.	
FOREVER: CHANGED	2022	GIANT	Bournemouth, UK		
The Opposite of a Feminist	2022	GIANT	Bournemouth, UK	Solo retrospective of Sarah Maple.	

== Speaking and writing ==
Semple has spoken at the Institute of Contemporary Arts, the Southbank Centre's Changing Minds festival, and the Royal College of Art. He has written for The Guardian and Vogue España, and presented art-education segments for BBC Bitesize.

== Publications ==
- Semple, Stuart. Make Art or Die Trying: The Only Art Book You'll Ever Need If You Want to Make Art That Changes the World. Quarto/Rockport Publishers, 2021. ISBN 978-0-7603-8703-0.

== Discography ==
- Exit – EP (2012), a multimedia release combining painting, film and soundtrack.

== Film ==
- Featured as himself in the documentary This Search for Meaning (2024), about the band Placebo.
- Appeared as himself in the documentary Melt It! (2026), directed by Mark Cartwright.
