= In It for the Money (song) =

Single by Client

from the album City
- B-side: "Down to the Underground", "Burning Up"
- Released: 14 June 2004
- Genre: Electroclash
- Length: 3:25
- Label: Toast Hawaii
- Songwriter(s): Client
- Producer(s): Client, Joe Wilson

Client singles chronology
"Here and Now" (2003)	"In It for the Money" (2004)	"Radio" (2004)

"In It for the Money" is a song by the English electronic group Client, released as the lead single from their second studio album, City (2004). The single peaked at number fifty-one on the UK Singles Chart. The B-side "Down to the Underground" features Pete Doherty on vocals.

== Track listings ==
UK CD single (CDTH005)

1. "In It for the Money" – 3:24
2. "Down to the Underground" – 3:05
3. "Burning Up" – 3:56

UK 7" single (TH005)

A. "In It for the Money" – 3:24
B. "Down to the Underground" – 3:05

UK and U.S. 12" single (UK: 12TH005 / U.S.: MUTE 9252-0)

A1. "In It for the Money" (The Grid Static In The Attic Mix) – 7:17
A2. "In It for the Money" (Client vs The Zip Remix) – 4:55
B1. "In It for the Money" (Extended Mix) – 4:52
B2. "In It for the Money" (Grand National Remix) – 4:19

U.S. CD single (MUTE 9252-2)

1. "In It for the Money" – 3:24
2. "Down to the Underground" – 3:05
3. "Burning Up" – 3:56
4. "In It for the Money" (The Grid Static In The Attic Mix) – 7:17
5. "In It for the Money" (Client vs The Zip Remix) – 4:55
6. "In It for the Money" (Extended Mix) – 4:52
7. "In It for the Money" (Grand National Remix) – 4:19

== Charts ==
Chart performance for "In It for the Money"
Chart (2004)	Peak position
Scotland (OCC)	53
UK Singles (OCC)	51
