= Kicking the National Habit =

Studio album by Grand National
- Released: 24 May 2004
- Genres: Indietronica; post-punk; indie rock; alternative dance; new wave
- Length: 39:20
- Label: Sunday Best
- Producers: Rupert Lyddon, Lawrence "La" Rudd

Grand National chronology
| Kicking the National Habit (2004) | B-Sides, Remixes and Rarities (2007) |

Singles from Kicking the National Habit
- 1. "Peanut Dreams" Released: 18 December 2003; 2. "Talk Amongst Yourselves" Released: 19 April 2004; 3. "Cherry Tree" Released: 2 August 2004; 4. "Drink to Moving On" Released: 1 November 2004; 5. "Playing in the Distance" Released: 29 August 2005

Professional ratings
Review scores
| Source | Rating |
|---|---|
| AllMusic | 3.5/5 stars |

Kicking the National Habit is the debut album from British dance-rock duo Grand National. The album was released in the United Kingdom on 24 May 2004 by Sunday Best Records, and then in the United States almost two years later in March 2006. The US edition comes with seven bonus tracks, including remixes by The Glimmers and Sasha.

== Track listing ==
All tracks are written by Rupert Lyddon and Lawrence Rudd, except where noted.

| No. | Title | Writer(s) | Length |
|---|---|---|---|
| 1. | "Drink to Moving On" | | 3:23 |
| 2. | "Talk Amongst Yourselves" | | 4:29 |
| 3. | "Playing in the Distance" | | 4:04 |
| 4. | "Boner" | | 4:24 |
| 5. | "Peanut Dreams" | Martin Fulterman, Michael Kamen | 3:19 |
| 6. | "Cherry Tree" | Marc Cerrone, Raymond Donnez, Pamela Marion Forrest, Lyddon, Rudd | 3:16 |
| 7. | "Coming Round" | | 4:24 |
| 8. | "Daylight Goes" | | 4:06 |
| 9. | "North Sound Off" | | 3:56 |
| 10. | "Litter Bin" | | 3:59 |
| Total length: | | | 39:20 |

US and French CD bonus tracks
| No. | Title | Length |
|---|---|---|
| 11. | "Your Rules Obey" | 3:03 |
| 12. | "Strange Magnificent Noise" | 4:14 |
| 13. | "Sixty Seven Up" | 3:52 |
| 14. | "Rabbit Facts" | 4:42 |
| 15. | "Playing in the Distance" (Elliot James remix radio edit) | 3:53 |
| 16. | "Playing in the Distance" (Glimmmix) | 8:12 |
| 17. | "Talk Amongst Yourselves" (Sasha remix) | 9:42 |
| Total length: | | 76:58 |

== Singles ==
- "Peanut Dreams" (a.k.a. Grand National EP) (18 December 2003)
  - "Peanut Dreams" / "Playing in the Distance" / "Criminal" / "Drink to Moving On"
- "Talk Amongst Yourselves" (19 April 2004)
  - b/w "Rub Your Potion" / "Leaves"
- "Cherry Tree" (2 August 2004)
  - b/w "Rabbit Facts" / "Lay Me Down"
- "Drink to Moving On" (1 November 2004)
  - b/w "Strange Magnificent Noise" / "Sixty Seven Up" / "Drink to Moving On" (Enhanced Video)
- "Playing in the Distance" (29 August 2005)
  - "Playing in the Distance" (Elliot James Remix Radio Edit) / "Your Rules Obey" / "Playing in the Distance" (Glimmmix) / "Talk Amongst Yourselves" (Sasha Remix)
