= Client (band) =

English electronic music group

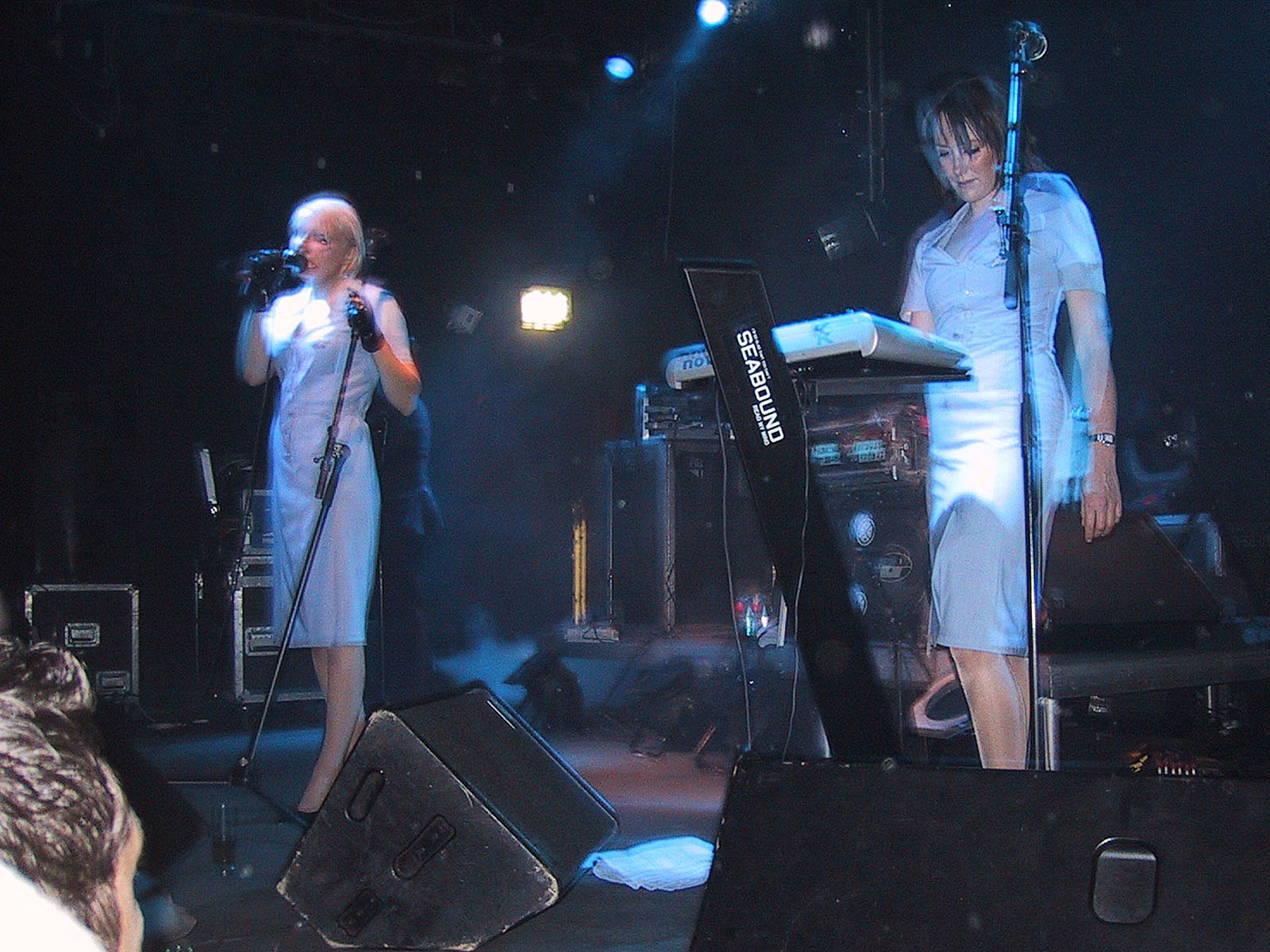
- Client performing at Kulturfabrik Krefeld in Germany on 17 September 2005. From left: Sarah Blackwood, Kate Holmes

Background information
- Origin: London, England
- Genres: Electroclash; synth-pop
- Years active: 2002–present
- Labels: Toast Hawaii; Mute; Out of Line; SPV, Loser Friendly; SubSpace Communications; Metropolis; Noiselab
- Members: Kate Holmes (Client A); Nicole Thomas (Client N); Live only; Mush Berrier (Client M) – bass; Charlotte Hatherley (Client C) – bass; Emma Fox (Client F) – bass; Client X
- Past members: Sarah Blackwood (Client B); Emily Mann (Client E)

Client (frequently stylised as CLIEͶT) are an English electronic music group from London, formed in 2002. They are most popular in Germany where they have had limited commercial success. They typically combine airline hostess uniforms or shiny fetish fashion outfits with glamour-girl aesthetics and harsh electronics to create a sound reminiscent of early forays into electronic sound manipulation and new wave. Their uniforms have become their trademark.

== History ==
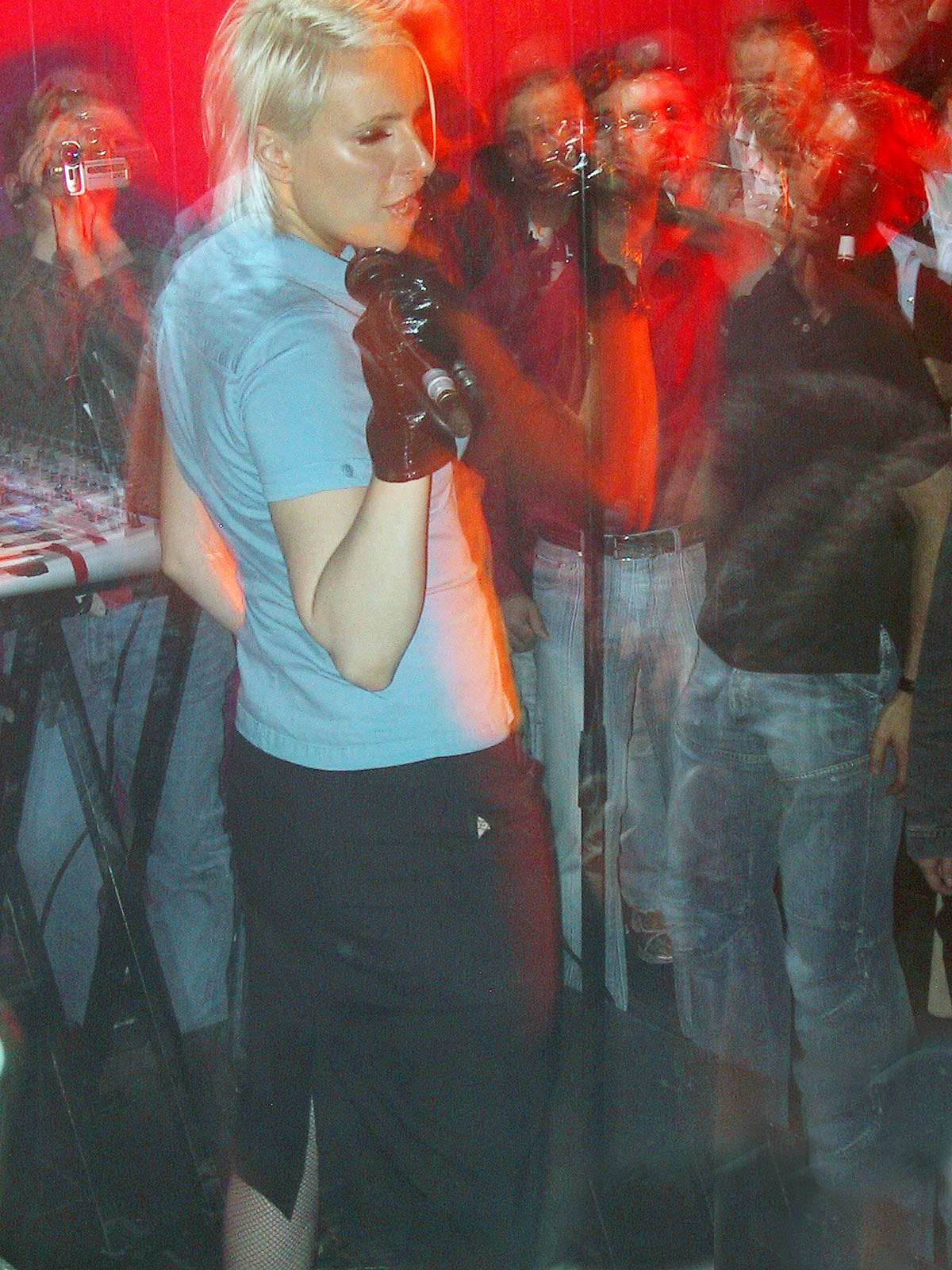
Client B performing at Hotel Shanghai in Essen, Germany in June 2005

The original band members were formerly known only anonymously as Client A and Client B, to the extent that their faces were not shown on any publicity photos; it has since been revealed that they are Kate Holmes (as Client A) and Sarah Blackwood (Client B). Holmes, formerly of Frazier Chorus and Technique, later started the fashion label Client London, and is married to Alan McGee (founder of Creation Records and discoverer of Oasis). Blackwood is the lead singer of Dubstar. AllMusic lists David Bowie, Joy Division, Kraftwerk, the Human League, Orchestral Manoeuvres in the Dark and X-Ray Spex among their influences.

In late 2005 a new member, Client E, joined the group. This was Emily Mann, who was a contestant on the Channel 5 reality show Make Me a Supermodel, an artist, and an active DJ, usually performing as Emily Strange. Client E left the band in June 2007. In November 2007 Charlotte Hatherley joined the band as Client C, to fill the vacant role of bassist on their European and Scandinavian tours.

Client was the first act signed to Depeche Mode member Andy Fletcher's record label, Toast Hawaii. They have toured with Depeche Mode and Erasure.

Client have collaborated with several high-profile musicians and directors. Their video for "Pornography" was directed by French director Jamie Deliessche from video production company Schmooze. It features Carl Barât (of The Libertines and Dirty Pretty Things) on vocals. The song "Down to the Underground" features Pete Doherty, also of The Libertines, and frontman of Babyshambles. The song "Overdrive" features Martin L. Gore of Depeche Mode. The song "Where's the Rock and Roll Gone" features Tim Burgess of The Charlatans. Client have collaborated with Die Krupps, Moonbootica and Replica on selected tracks and also have done a special duet, "Suicide Sister" with Douglas McCarthy of Nitzer Ebb.

It was announced in October 2006 that Client had parted ways with the Toast Hawaii label. In November 2006, Client signed with Out of Line in German-speaking Europe, SubSpace Communications in Scandinavia, Metropolis Records in North America, Noiselab in Latin America and their own label Loser Friendly Records in the UK and Ireland.

It was confirmed in December 2010 that Blackwood had left the band and a new member was being recruited to front the band. In July 2011, Holmes announced that Xan Tyler—with whom Holmes formed the synth-pop duo Technique in the mid-1990s—would take over live lead vocals for the band, replacing Blackwood. However, this never came to fruition.

On 4 September 2013, Client debuted the music video for their single "You Can Dance", which introduced new member Nicole Thomas, known as Client N. Their fifth studio album, Authority, was released on 21 March 2014 on Out of Line Music.

Client has been on a indefinite hiatus since 2014.

== Discography ==
=== Studio albums ===
- Client (2003)
- City (2004)
- Heartland (2007)
- Command (2009)
- Authority (2014)

=== Compilation albums ===
- Going Down (2004)
- Metropolis (2005)
- Untitled Remix (2008)

=== Live albums ===
- Live at Club Koko (2006)
- Live in Porto (2007)
- Live in Hamburg (2009)

=== Singles ===
Title	Year	Peak chart positions		Album
Title	Year	UK	GER	Album
"Price of Love"	2003	189	–	Client
"Rock and Roll Machine"	2003	124	–	Client
"Here and Now"	2003	–	–	Client
"In It for the Money"	2004	51	–	City
"Radio"	2004	68	–	City
"Pornography"	2005	22	–	City
"Lights Go Out"	2006	–	–	Heartland
"Zerox Machine"	2007	199	–	Heartland
"Drive"	2007	–	90	Heartland
"It's Not Over"	2007	–	–	Heartland
"Can You Feel"	2009	–	–	Command
"Make Me Believe in You"	2009	–	–	Command
"You Can Dance"	2013	–	–	Authority
"Refuge"	2014	–	–	Authority
"–" denotes a recording that did not chart or was not released in that territory.
