= Andy Fletcher (musician) =

English musician (1961–2022)

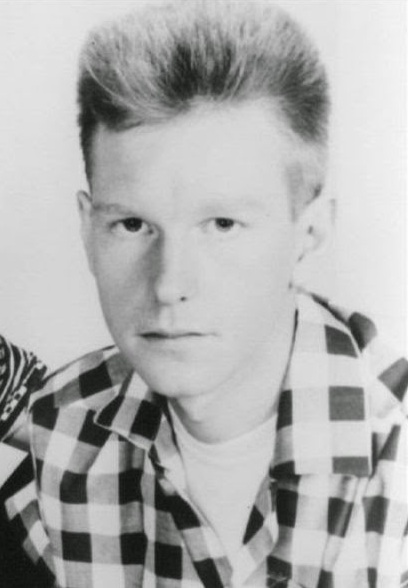
- Fletcher in 1982

Background information
- Also known as: Fletch
- Born: Andrew John Fletcher; 8 July 1961; Nottingham, England
- Died: 26 May 2022 (aged 60) London, England
- Genres: Electronic; synth-pop; new wave; alternative rock; electronic rock; industrial rock
- Occupations: Musician; DJ
- Instruments: Synthesizer; keyboards; bass; sampler; guitar
- Years active: 1977–2022
- Labels: Mute; Toast Hawaii
- Formerly of: Depeche Mode

Andrew John Fletcher (8 July 1961 – 26 May 2022), also known as Fletch, was an English musician and founding member of the electronic band Depeche Mode. In 2020, he and the band were inducted into the Rock and Roll Hall of Fame.

== Early life ==
Fletcher was the eldest of four siblings born to Joy and John Fletcher. The family moved to Basildon from Nottingham when he was two years old, when his father, an engineer, was offered a job at a cigarette factory. He was active in the local Boys' Brigade from an early age, primarily to play football. He attended Nicholas Comprehensive where he was in the same sixth form class as Martin Gore and Alison Moyet. After leaving school he worked as an insurance clerk.

== Career ==
=== Depeche Mode ===
Fletcher, and acquaintances Vince Clarke and Martin Gore, were in their mid-teens when punk rock arrived on the music scene. Fletcher said this was "obviously the perfect age to experience it", noting that "we were very lucky in life". Fletcher and Clarke formed the short-lived band No Romance in China, in which Fletcher played bass guitar. In 1980, Clarke and Fletcher formed a band called Composition of Sound, with Clarke on vocals/guitar and Fletcher on bass; the pair were soon joined by Gore as a third instrumentalist.

Influences on their work included Siouxsie and the Banshees, the Cure, Kraftwerk, the Human League and OMD. Clarke served as chief songwriter and also provided lead vocals until singer Dave Gahan was recruited into the band later in 1980, after which they adopted the name Depeche Mode at Gahan's suggestion. Clarke left the group in late 1981, shortly after the release of their debut album Speak & Spell.

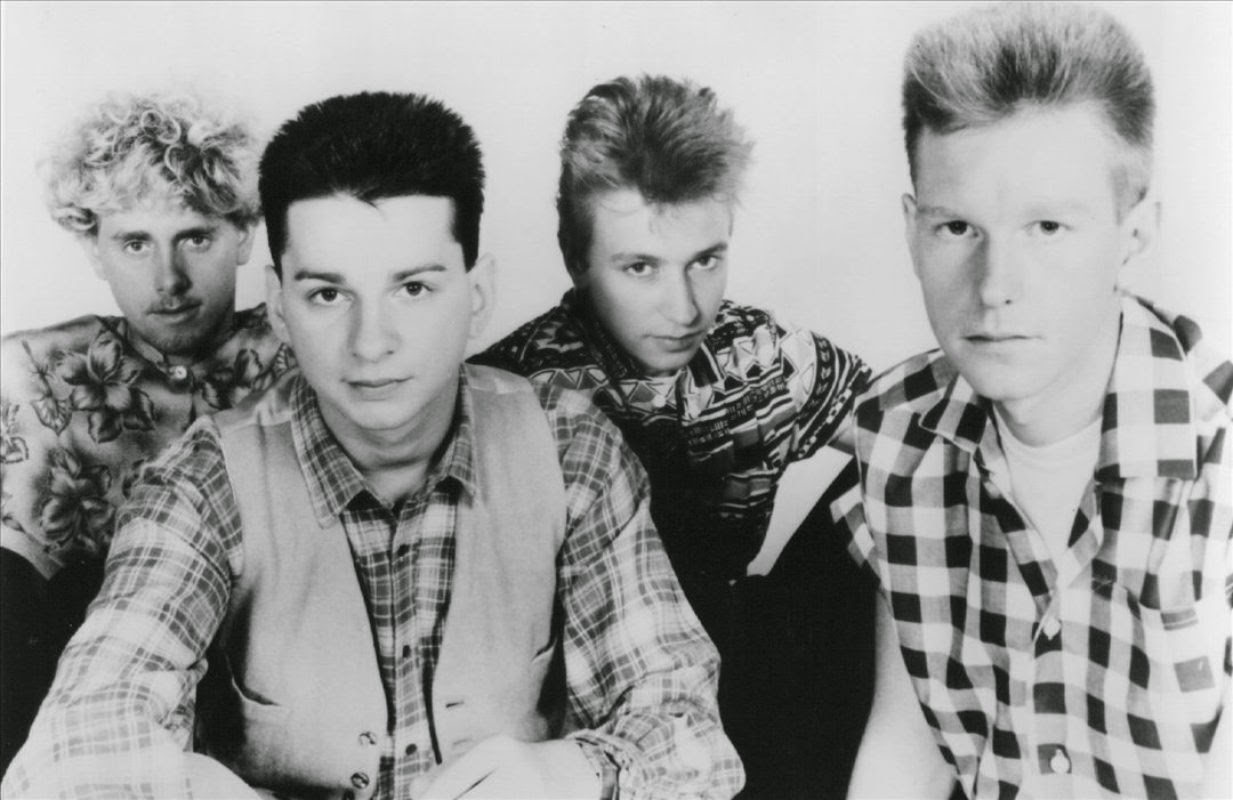
Fletcher (right) with Depeche Mode in 1982

Their 1982 follow-up album, A Broken Frame, was recorded as a trio, with Gore taking over primary songwriting duties. Musician and producer Alan Wilder joined the band in late 1982 and the group continued as a quartet.

In 1989, while the band was preparing Violator, Fletcher suffered from anxiety and depression. He had a relapse in 1993 during the recording of Songs of Faith and Devotion. One year later, he had to leave the Exotic Tour/Summer Tour '94 due to a nervous breakdown, and the band played without him in South America and the United States.

After Alan Wilder left the band in 1995, the band's core trio of Gahan, Gore, and Fletcher remained active up to the release of their 2017 album, Spirit, and ensuing world tour.

==== Role ====
Fletcher's role within Depeche Mode was often a topic of speculation. In early incarnations of the band, he played (electric and later synth) bass. As the band evolved after Vince Clarke's departure in 1981, Fletcher's role changed as each of the band members took to the areas that suited them and benefited the band collectively. In a key scene in D. A. Pennebaker's 1989 documentary film about the band, Fletcher clarified these roles: "Martin's the songwriter, Alan's the good musician, Dave's the vocalist, and I bum around."

In his review of 2005's Playing the Angel, long after Wilder's departure from the band, Rolling Stone writer Gavin Edwards riffed upon Fletcher's statement with the opening line: "Depeche Mode's unique division of labour has been long established, with each of the three remaining members having a distinct role: Martin Gore writes the songs, Dave Gahan sings them and Andy Fletcher shows up for photo shoots and cashes the checks." Fletcher was the only member of the band with no songwriting credits.

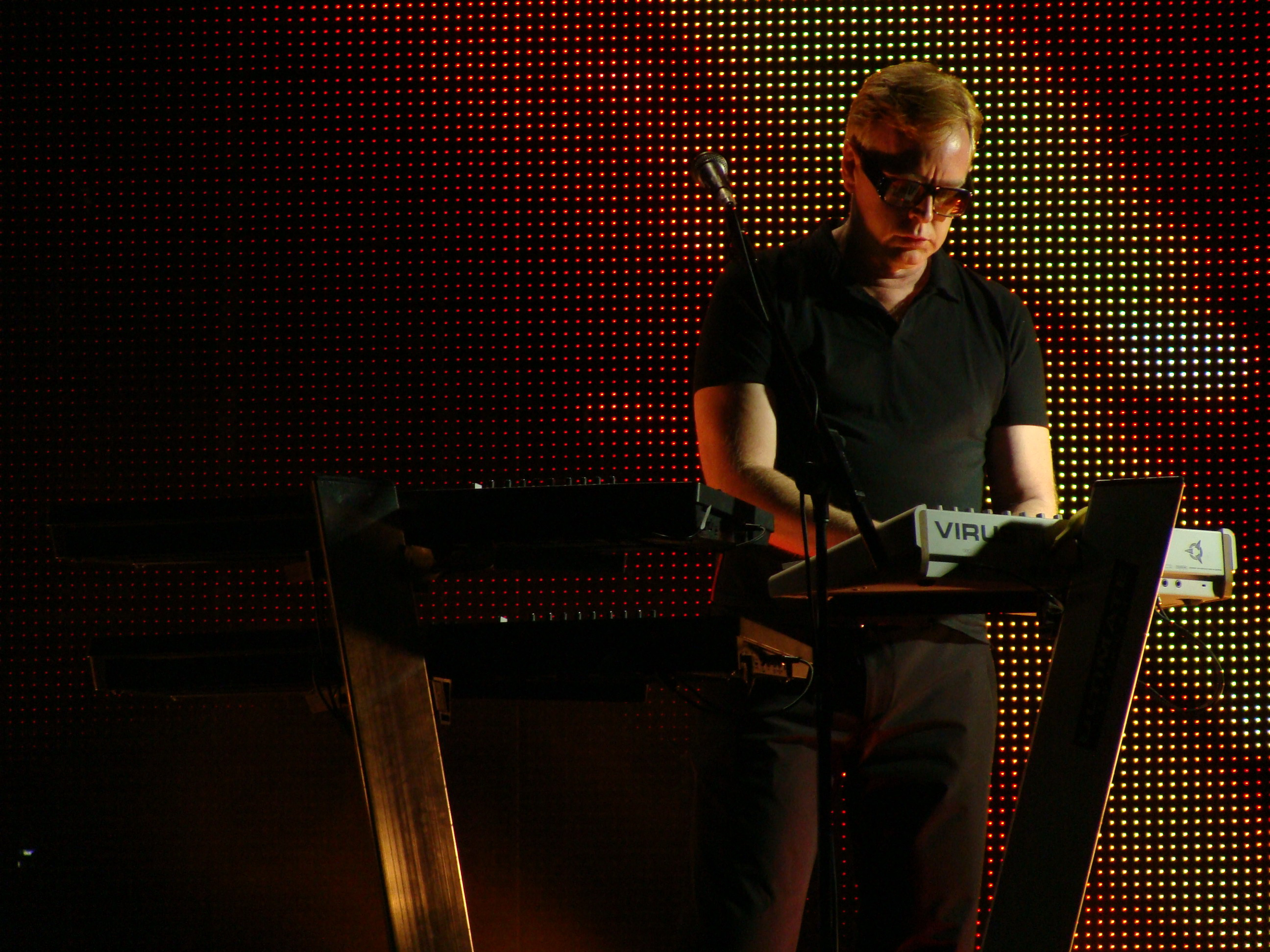
Fletcher performing with Depeche Mode in 2009

With the band having not always employed a full-time manager, Fletcher handled many of the band's business, legal, and other non-musical interests over the years. In the press kit for Songs of Faith and Devotion, he discussed being genuinely interested in many of the business aspects of the music industry that other performing musicians shy away from, and as such, he took over a lot of the business management aspects of the band. In later years, this included acting as the band's "spokesman", with Fletcher often being the one to announce Depeche Mode news, such as record album and tour details.

He was also said to be the member who was "the tiebreaker" and the one who "brings the band together". According to interviews, Fletcher built the compromise between Gahan and Gore that settled their serious dispute following 2001's Exciter album and the subsequent Exciter Tour over future songwriting duties within Depeche Mode.

In the studio and during live shows, Fletcher contributed a variety of supporting synthesizer parts, including bass parts, strings, and drone sounds, and various samples. Fletcher was the only member of Depeche Mode who did not often sing. Although he can be seen singing in videos of Depeche's past live performances, usually Fletcher's vocals were either mixed very low or heard only through his own stage monitors. Fletcher sang on the interlude "Crucified" on Violator. According to Alan Wilder, every band member participated in the choir on the song "Condemnation" from Songs of Faith and Devotion and Wilder confirms this on the press kit of the same album. During a live event in 2023, producer Gareth Jones analyzed all the single elements of the song "Told You So", revealing Fletcher singing backing vocals during the last middle eight section of the song.

=== Toast Hawaii ===
In 2002, Fletcher launched his own record label, a Mute Records imprint called Toast Hawaii (named after the dish), and signed the band Client. He coordinated the recording of their eponymous 2003 debut and 2004's City, while also producing "extended remixes" for their subsequent singles "Price of Love", "Rock and Roll Machine", "Here and Now", "In It for the Money", "Radio", and "Pornography" (featuring Carl Barât of the Libertines).

Client left the label in 2006 and no further activity with Toast Hawaii was held or announced.

=== DJ career ===
Initially to support Client's live shows, Fletcher began touring as a DJ. Whenever he was on hiatus from Depeche Mode, Fletcher played occasional festivals and club gigs, and was known to include various exclusive Depeche remixes in his sets.

== Personal life ==
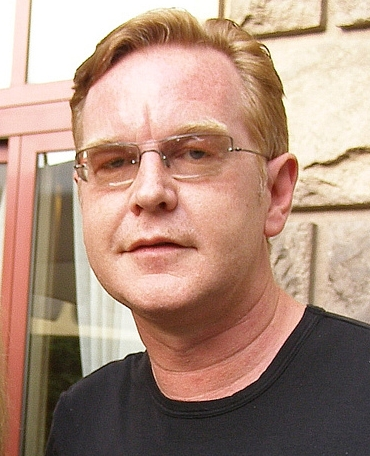
Fletcher in 2006

Fletcher was married to Gráinne Fletcher (née Mullan) for approximately 30 years. The couple had two children.

While Depeche Mode were touring with the band Blancmange in the early 1980s, Fletcher was renowned for his skill at chess. Neil Arthur of Blancmange has mentioned in interviews "never winning a game of chess with Andy Fletcher!" During the 1990s, Fletcher owned a restaurant called Gascogne located on Blenheim Terrace in St. John's Wood, London. He made a series of bad investments in the mid-1990s that led to a number of financial settlements involving Lloyd's of London and Daniel Miller.

Fletcher experienced anxiety and depression in 1989 when Depeche Mode was preparing Violator. His bandmates recommended that he seek in-patient treatment. Fletcher attributed his mental health struggles to an obsessive–compulsive disorder (OCD) he inherited from his father and the loss of his sister in her early twenties. Fletcher had a mental health relapse in 1993, and a nervous breakdown during the band's Exotic Tour in 1994.

== Death ==
Fletcher died on 26 May 2022, aged 60, following an aortic dissection while at home. His bandmates Gahan and Gore stated, "We are shocked and filled with overwhelming sadness with the untimely passing of our dear friend, family member and bandmate Andy 'Fletch' Fletcher". Gahan and Gore added that Fletcher had "a true heart of gold". Former Depeche Mode member Alan Wilder stated that learning of Fletcher's death was "a real bolt from the blue".

Lol Tolhurst, former member of the Cure, wrote, "I knew Andy and considered him a friend. We crossed many of the same pathways as younger men. My heart goes out to his family, bandmates, and DM fans. RIP Fletch."

Pet Shop Boys stated, "We're saddened and shocked that Andy Fletcher of Depeche Mode has died. Fletch was a warm, friendly and funny person who loved electronic music and could also give sensible advice about the music business."

Other artists who expressed condolences following Fletcher's death included OMD, Alison Moyet, New Order, Gary Numan, Limmy and Erasure (the latter of whom was founded by former Depeche Mode bandmate Vince Clarke).

== Album discography with Depeche Mode ==
- Speak & Spell (1981)
- A Broken Frame (1982)
- Construction Time Again (1983)
- Some Great Reward (1984)
- Black Celebration (1986)
- Music for the Masses (1987)
- Violator (1990)
- Songs of Faith and Devotion (1993)
- Ultra (1997)
- Exciter (2001)
- Playing the Angel (2005)
- Sounds of the Universe (2009)
- Delta Machine (2013)
- Spirit (2017)
