= Chris Constantinou =

English musician

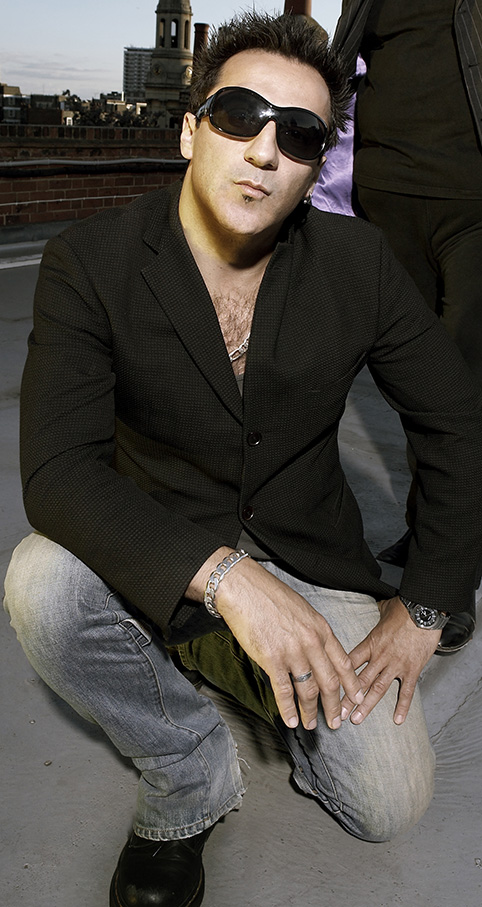

Background information
- Also known as: Chris De Niro
- Origin: London, England
- Genres: Rock; punk; world; hip hop
- Instruments: Vocals; bass guitar; guitar; flute; harmonica
- Labels: Ebony; RCA; Sony; Howl; Damaged Goods; Sony ATV; Universal
- Website: chrisconstantinou.com

Chris Constantinou is an English musician, best known as the bass guitarist and backing vocalist for Adam Ant.

== Childhood and early bands ==
Constantinou was born at Charing Cross Hospital in Charing Cross Road, London and at the age of three, he moved to Plymouth. He went to Plymouth College before a brief spell at Plymouth Art College. He performed with school and garage bands supporting 1970s artists such as King Crimson, Snafu, and Sassafras. His professional career started when he joined Diz Watson, the renowned exponent of New Orleans blues/Professor Longhair-style piano and barrel house blues, as bass player. In 1977, he formed the rock band the Drill. Acting as co-writer and bassist, they first signed to Ebony Records before moving to RCA Records for a string of singles, several of which were produced by Chas Chandler (from the band the Animals, who also found and produced Jimi Hendrix and Slade).

== Music career ==
=== 1980s: Chris De Niro era ===
In 1982 Constantinou joined Adam Ant's live band as bass guitarist and backing vocalist in time for the Friend or Foe album tour and the video for the single Desperate But Not Serious. He also took a minor acting role as Toulouse Lautrec in the video for Ant's 1983 single Strip. Ant later pared down his eight-piece touring outfit to a four piece which first appeared on TV performances of Ant's UK top 5 single "Puss 'N Boots" in late 1983 before becoming a full time touring/recording unit in mid-1984. Under the pseudonym Chris De Niro, Constantinou became an integral part of the mid-1980s "Ant/Marco/Wiczling/De Niro" line up which recorded the UK Top 20 single "Apollo 9" and parent album Vive Le Rock, both of which were produced by Tony Visconti. Constantinou's performances in Ant's band included Top of the Pops, Saturday Night Live, American Bandstand and, on stage, Radio City Music Hall and 1985's Live Aid concert at Wembley Stadium. Parting with Ant in 1985, Constantinou spent time with SF Go, a Miles Copeland III-managed band he had formed with Danny Kustow (TRB, Glen Matlock).

=== 1990s: JackieOnAssid era ===
At the beginning of the 1990s, Constantinou formed a band with Bow Wow Wow's Annabella Lwin, fronted by Annabella with Chris as co-writer, bassist and backing vocalist. They built a substantial following hit singles like Do What You Do (Sony, 1994), a dancefloor hit thanks to remixes from Farley & Heller and Junior Vasquez. The project was produced by Steve Lironi (Fun Lovin' Criminals, Happy Mondays). In this period, Chris also had a songwriting partnership with Guy Chambers.

Chris took centre stage to form post-punk outfit JackieOnAssid in 1996. As lead singer, songwriter and bassist, JackieOnAssid toured Europe three times, released two albums (2001's 4Play and 2002's Zip Me Up) and supported Iggy Pop. The videos for these singles were directed by award-winning British film maker Paul Hills. He later featured the band's Meditation Man single in his 2003 film The Poet (Dougray Scott/Laura Elena Harring).

=== 2000s: The Wolfmen era ===
In 2004, Chris began work on his project, The Wolfmen for which he handled lead vocals, co-writing, bass and various other instruments. It saw him reunite with another former Ant, songwriter/guitarist Marco Pirroni, to blend a sound described by Mojo magazine as "exuberant filth... Chris and Marco do growing old disgracefully with style.”

Constantinou played and produced some tracks on The Slits' EP, Revenge of the Killer Slits in 2006 and co-wrote tracks "The Wolf Is Getting Married" (Single 2012), "I had a Baby" (Album track 2012) for Sinéad O'Connor's album, How About I Be Me (And You Be You)?, released in March 2012.

A collaboration with Daler Mehndi in 2007 materialized in the Bhangra / rock single Two Eyes (Do Naina), which topped the BBC Asian Network charts.

=== 2010s: The Mutants era ===
In January 2013, Chris Constantinou developed in a discussion with Eugene Butcher, editor from the magazine Vive Le Rock, and Dave Collins the idea of an album set out to retrace the roots of punk, new wave and ska, featuring all-star punk musicians. It materialized in the creation of the musical supergroup The Mutants, with Chris Constantinou and Paul Frazer as core members, later also joined by Rat Scabies. After a series of initial projects (like Nuclear Wasteland, made at the disaster site in Chernobyl), the first album, Rhythm and Punk Review, was released in July 2014. In this album, Constantinou brought together and collaborated with a variety of musicians, like Norman Watt-Roy (Ian Dury and The Blockheads/Wilko), T. V. Smith (The Adverts), Charlie Harper (UK Subs), Jake Burns (Stiff Little Fingers), Knox (The Vibrators), Neville Staple (The Specials), Judy Nylon (John Cale/Brian Eno), Beki Bondage (Vice Squad), Texas Terri (Texas Terri & The Stiff Ones/Texas Terri Bomb), Preston Heyman (Kate Bush/Tom Robinson Band/Massive Attack), Tim Smart, Jonathan Read (The Specials), and Joe Atkinson (Flipron).

A subsequent Mutants album, Tokyo Nights, released in May 2015, had all the songs fronted by a rotating set of Japanese guest stars. The third album, Your Desert My Mind (October 2016), is a collaboration with a series of guests from the Californian desert rock scene, among them David Catching from Eagles of Death Metal, Chris Goss from Masters of Reality, Brent DeBoer, Peter Holmström and Zia McCabe from The Dandy Warhols, Sean Wheeler from Throw Rag and Victoria Williams. The album was recorded at Rancho De La Luna in Joshua Tree, California. In October 2016, The Mutants also went on a tour in California together with the guests Chris Goss, Sean Wheeler and Bingo Richey.

As a guest musician, Chris played flute with The Dandy Warhols, Holy Holy (the album The Man Who Sold the World Live in London), Brant Bjork & Sean Wheeler, Andreas Grega (the albums Mikrouli Mou and Vallar Av Snö), and Nerina Pallot (the album Fires). He also guested on bass in the 2016 UK Station to Station tour by Earl Slick and Bernard Fowler.

In June 2016, he released with The Mutants the mini-album Time For a Drink (post Production Courtney Taylor-Taylor & Brandon Eggleston).

=== Recent years ===
The work with Rat Scabies as core members of The Mutants developed also into the project One Thousand Motels, involving only the two of them (quicker and easier to put in practice, considering the logistics around The Mutants musicians as a supergroup). In 2020, they released the album 2% out of Sync, described in reviews as forging new ground. Their music is characterized by Vive le Rock as "upbeat rock songs with a twist in the lyrical tail" and by Midlands Rock as "a match seemingly made in rock ‘n’ roll heaven (or a punky purgatory)".

The second album Get In Where You Fit In was released in April 2021, with Sean Wheeler as vocalist. At its creation also participated American musicians like guitarist Hal Lindes (Dire Straits), Marc Franklin and Arthur Edmaiston from Memphis on Horns (Aretha Franklin, Isaac Hayes, Snoop Dogg, Stevie Wonder) and Jonathan Moore with the First Street Choir from Mississippi. The musicians from London are the percussionist Preston Heyman (Kate Bush, Massive Attack, Terence Trent D'Arby), on harmonica Steve 'West' Weston (Roger Daltrey, Wilko Johnson), on slide guitar Dave Ahern, The Specials Brass Section & Su Robinson (The South Brass) and pianist Diz Watson (Dr. John). The album was noticed for its blend of gospel, soul, funk, blues, and rock with Deep South nuances.

Also in 2020, he started the project RudeGRL + CC, in collaboration with Jenna Dickens. The music is described as a blend of post-punk/punk and hip hop (Jenna has a hip hop background). In 2020, they released the album Anthemic Hip Hop (Universal Music) and one of its songs, "Helen Keller", won the 2020 PMA Best Hip Hop Track award. In September 2020, they released the EP Like Wow and, in January 2021, the single Brand New Cadillac, noticed in reviews as an update with modern sonic textures of the 1959 classic rockabilly hit by Vince Taylor.

Some of his songs were included in well-known soundtracks, like "Bamboo Moon" from Tokyo Nights album in the soundtrack of the TV series Money Heist.

== Discography ==
With the Drill

- Les Drill (single, 1978)
- Juliet (single, 1979)
- If I Could Read Your Mind (single, 1980)
- Bang Our 'Eads Together (single, 1980)

With Hollywood Exiles

- Anonymous Letters (single, 1981)

With Adam Ant

- Apollo 9 (single, 1984)
- Vive Le Rock (album, 1985)
- Vive Le Rock (single, 1985)
- B-Side Babies (album, 1994)

With Annabella Lwin

- Car Sex (single, 1994)
- Do What You Do (single, 1994)
- Super Boom (album 2016)

With the Slits

- Revenge of the Killer Slits (EP, 2006)

With the Wolfmen

- The Wolfmen (EP, 2006)
- Kama Sutra (single, 2006)
- I Put A Spell on You (collaboration with Primal Scream, 2006)
- The Wolfmen Sell Out (2007)
- Give Listen Help (Filter Magazine compilation album, 2007)
- Two Eyes (Do Naina) (single with Daler Mehndi, 2007)
- Thieves & Liars (single) (single with Daler Mehndi, 2007)
- Cecilie (single, 2007)
- Needle in the Camle's Eye (EP, 2008)
- Chang Yare (Paradise Lost) (collaboration with Namgyal Lhamo, 2008)
- Modernity Killed Every Night (album, 2008)
- Better Days (single, 2008)
- Little Steven's Underground Garage Presents... The Coolest Songs in the World Volume 6 (compilation album, 2009)
- Jackie, is it my Birthday? (duet with Sinéad O'Connor (single, 2009) Produced by Steve Musters Post Production and Mix by Courtney Taylor-Taylor (single, 2010)
- Take Refuge in Pleasure: The Songs of Roxy Music Revisited (compilation album, 2009)
- 20 July Produced by Steve Musters Post Production by Courtney Taylor-Taylor (single, 2010)
- The Wolfmen Sell Out Again (2010)
- Marilyn Monroe-Wam Bam JFK Produced by Steve Musters Post Production and Mix by Courtney Taylor-Taylor (single, 2010)
- Married to the Eiffel Tower (Howl) (2011)

With SSG

- Praise You (Single 2012)
- Sugar, Salt & Glue (EP 2012)

With Sinéad O'Connor

- The Wolf Is Getting Married (Single 2012)
- I had a Baby (Album track 2012)

With Andreas Grega

- Mikrouli Mou (Album 2012)
- Vallar Av Snö (Album 2012)

With Anisa Arslanagic and Paul Frazer

- Nuclear Wasteland (Album 2014)

With the Mutants

- Rhythm and Punk Review (Album 2014)
- Tokyo Nights (Album 2015)
- Time For a Drink (Mini Album 2016, Post Production Courtney Taylor-Taylor & Brandon Eggleston)
- Your Desert My Mind (Album 2016)
- Bamboo Moon (EP 2018 and 2021, as featured in Money Heist)

With Paul Frazer

- Ghost Towns of the American West (Album 2016)
- The New Psyche (Album 2016)
- Taiko (Album 2016)
- Tokyo Concrete (Album 2016)
- Electronic India (Album 2016)
- Second Line Grooves (2017)
- Ghosts of Jazzland (2017)
- The Mysteries (2017)
- Tales from Big Sur (2017)
- China (2017)
- Classic Synths: Old School 80's Sounds (2017)

With Oliver Straus and Rat Scabies

- Nyc Nrg (2018)

With James Young

- Four-Wheel Drive (2018)
- Yoga Chill (2019)
- Ethnic Textures (2019)
- Electro Rock Workout (2020)
- Christmas Joy (2021)
- Softly, Softly (2022)
- Stoner Dub (2022)
- Sahara (2023)
- A Chunk of Post Punk (2024)

With James Young, Paul Frazer and Vincent Welch

- Mumbai Chic (2018)

With James Young and Nicholas de Carlo

- Lo-Fi Indie (2019)

With James Young and Florence Sabeva

- Minimal Organic (2021)

With James Young and Susie Webb

- Positive Thoughts (2022)

With Hal Lindes

- A Walk in the Woods (2018)
- New Wave Funk Rock (NWFR) (2018)
- Homebound (2020)
- Soft Guitars (2022)
- Folk Hop (2024)

With Hal Lindes and the Sunset Donkeys

- Setting It All On Fire (2024)

With One Thousand Motels

- 2% out of Sync (2020)
- Get In Where You Fit In (2021)

With RudeGRL + CC

- Anthemic Hip Hop (2020)
- Like Wow (2020)
- Brand New Cadillac (2021)
- Killer 16 (2021)
- Femme Power (2022)

Preceded by Gary Tibbs	Adam Ant bassist 1982 - 1985	Succeeded by Bruce Witkin
