= Like Wow (EP) =

EP by RudeGRL + CC
- Released: October 23, 2020
- Recorded: 2020
- Genre: Rap rock
- Length: 12:45
- Label: Firefly Entertainment
- Producer: Chris Constantinou, Nicholas de Carlo

RudeGRL + CC chronology
Like Wow (2020)	Brand New Cadillac (2021)

Like Wow is the debut EP of RudeGRL + CC, a collaborative project of Jenna Dickens (aka RudeGRL, from Basement Jaxx, Sub Focus) and Chris Constantinou (The Wolfmen, Sinéad O'Connor, Adam Ant, The Mutants, One Thousand Motels).

== Background ==
Jenna Dickens has a hip hop background and writes the lyrics and sings. Chris Constantinou has a punk rock background and writes and plays all the instruments and co-produces together with Nicholas de Carlo who also mixed the EP and programmed beats). The runner-up to Miss Burlesque 2018 Bunni Morretto is a dancer and visual element in the collaboration.

== Reception ==
The EP was noted for confronting subjects like racial abuse, homophobia, addiction, and sexual violence, but also for having a positive message of resilience and recovery. It received a 7/10 rating from Vive Le Rock.

== Track listing ==
No.	Title	Length
1.	"Like Wow"	2:06
2.	"Overkill"	2:39
3.	"Let Go"	3:45
4.	"Like Wow - Sunday Mix"	2:06
5.	"Like Wow - Instrumental"	2:06
Total length:		12:45
