= The Drill (British band) =

British punk rock band

- Genres: punk rock
- Years active: 1978–1980
- Labels: Ebony Records; RCA Records
- Members: Chris Constantinou (bass guitar); Dave Wilson (lead vocals); Mick Bienvenu (keyboards); Tom Toomey (lead guitar) (replaced by); Hal Lindes (lead guitar); Keith Atkinson (drums) (replaced by); Ray Weston (drums)

The Drill was a British punk rock band formed in 1978 and dissolved in 1980, with some of its former members then regrouping in 1981 in a new short-lived band named Hollywood Exiles. The Drill was the first significant career breakthrough and success for several musicians, like Chris Constantinou (The Wolfmen, Sinéad O'Connor, Adam Ant, The Mutants, One Thousand Motels), Hal Lindes (Dire Straits) and Tom Toomey (The Zombies).

== History ==
The initial nucleus of this band grew around the founding members Chris Constantinou (bass guitar) and Dave Wilson (lead vocals), then adding Mick Bienvenu (keyboards), Tom Toomey (lead guitar) and Keith Atkinson (drums). In 1978, they signed their first recording deal with Ebony Records and in the next year they moved to RCA Records. They performed live in a string of tours (in some of them supporting Slade) and recorded a number of singles, several of which were produced by Chas Chandler (from the band The Animals, who also found and produced Jimi Hendrix and Slade). During this time, the band team underwent some changes, with the drummer Ray Weston replacing Keith Atkinson, while Hal Lindes took over the guitar part from Tom Toomey.

By the end of 1980, Hal Lindes left the band after becoming full-member of Dire Straits. Many of the remaining members regrouped next year under a new short-lived band name, called Hollywood Exiles (also produced by RCA Records) and released a single, with a musical style described as UK new wave. Its members were: Chris Constantinou (bass guitar), Ray Weston (drums), Mick Bienvenu (keyboards), Mitchell Leslie (guitar), and Loui Beau (lead vocals).

Then, in 1982, Chris Constantinou joined Adam Ant's live band as bass guitarist and any prospects of re-morphing the team initially developed as The Drill then clearly disappeared. In its relatively short time span, The Drill turned into the first significant breakthrough for several aspiring musicians (at that time), like Chris Constantinou, Hal Lindes or Tom Toomey. Later, Chris Constantinou and Hal Lindes resumed their collaboration in creating a new series of music albums.

== Discography ==
The Drill

- Les Drill (single, 1978)
- Juliet (single, 1979)
- If I Could Read Your Mind (single, 1980)
- Bang Our 'Eads Together (single, 1980)

Hollywood Exiles

- Anonymous Letters (single, 1981)

Later Chris Constantinou and Hal Lindes collaboration

- A Walk In The Woods (2018)
- New Wave Funk Rock (NWFR) (2018)
- Homebound (2020)
- Soft Guitars (2022)
- Folk Hop (2024)

Chris Constantinou, Hal Lindes and The Sunset Donkeys

- Setting It All On Fire (2024)
