= David Morgan (psychoanalyst) =

British psychoanalyst

David Howell Morgan is a British psychoanalyst and consultant psychotherapist who has worked at the Portman Clinic London and Tavistock and Portman NHS Trust for 25 years. He has been Chair of The Political Mind Seminars for 10 years at the London Institute of Psychoanalysis. He is also Chair of Political Psychoanalysis that organises events usually at The Frontline Club London.

== Publications/contributions ==
Morgan's writing, as with his political and social contributions, tends to focus on the intersection between psychoanalysis and the political, social. He has also written on Pat Barker, Jorge Luis Borges, and repeatedly on the works of Sigmund Freud, Melanie Klein and Donald Winnicott. His co-edited volume Lectures on Violence, Perversion and Delinquency. The Portman Papers Series deals extensively with the role of violence in patients at the Portman Clinic.

=== Books ===
- Morgan, David (2005) co ed Stan Ruszczynski "Lectures on 'Violence, Perversion and Delinquency'". The Portman Papers Series
- Morgan, David (2019) "The Unconscious in Social and Political Life". Edited. Phoenix. Firing the Mind.
- Morgan, David (2020) "A Deeper Cut. Further Explorations of the Unconscious in Social and Political Life". Phoenix. Firing the Mind

== Multi-media ==
Morgan has contributed to public debate and hosts discussions with leading academics in the political, social, and psychoanalytic fields, on his radio show "Frontier Psychoanalyst". Along with the recurring radio show, Morgan has made many television appearances and frequently appears as a discussant on BBC Radio. Morgan also appeared in a documentary called "Married to the Eiffel Tower" investigating the psychological condition objectum sexuality. The documentary investigates the famous case of Erika Eiffel.

- BBC Radio 4 'Whistleblowers: Saints or Stirrers', with John Waite 11.6.14
- ABC TV Australia 'Whistleblowing' 15.2.14
- BBC Radio 4 'Something Understood' with John McCarthy Vincent van Gogh's Self Portrait with Bandaged Ear' 25.6.14.
- ABC TV Australia Late Night Live with Philip Adams – contributor. "Is neo-liberalism making us sick?". Wed 10 May 2016
- Resonance 104.4: "Frontier Psychoanalyst"

== Conferences ==
Morgan has hosted, spoken at, and arranged many conferences, seminars and lectures, both nationally and internationally. In January 2017 Morgan delivered the prestigious Bob Gosling memorial lecture in Bristol. He has also spoken at the Acropolis, Athens, Georgia, China, Poland, The Freud Memorial Lecture, Melbourne, Australia.
