= 2% out of Sync =

Studio album by One Thousand Motels
- Released: September 24, 2020
- Recorded: 2020
- Genres: rock, psychedelia, punk, funk, blues, rock and roll
- Length: 38:29
- Label: Cleopatra
- Producers: Chris Constantinou, Rat Scabies, Nicholas de Carlo

One Thousand Motels chronology
| 2% out of Sync (2020) | Get In Where You Fit In (2021) |

2% out of Sync is the first album by One Thousand Motels, a collaboration project of Rat Scabies (The Damned) and Chris Constantinou (The Wolfmen, Sinéad O'Connor, Adam Ant, The Mutants).

== Background ==
The bassist/multi-instrumentalist Chris Constantinou and drummer Rat Scabies collaborated for some years as core members of The Mutants rock supergroup. When making the fourth Mutants album, Rat also noticed some other demos Chris was working on and this turned into the project One Thousand Motels, involving only the two of them (quicker and easier to put into practice, considering the logistics around The Mutants musicians as a supergroup). In September 2020, they released the first album 2% out of Sync.

== Reception ==
The album was noticed in reviews as forging new ground with only a customary nod to the past of the two musicians. A Vive Le Rock article characterized the music as "upbeat rock songs with a twist in the lyrical tail" and the review of the same magazine gave it a 7/10 rating, describing it as a high spirited, elaborated album.

== Track listing ==
| No. | Title | Length |
|---|---|---|
| 1. | "Beautiful Losers" | 4:07 |
| 2. | "Definition" | 3:40 |
| 3. | "Gone" | 2:57 |
| 4. | "Rain" | 3:39 |
| 5. | "Kings X Guru" | 3:25 |
| 6. | "Andy's Wonder World" | 5:17 |
| 7. | "Kill Me If You Love Me" | 2:47 |
| 8. | "2% Out" | 4:50 |
| 9. | "I Like the Sex in the Suburbs" | 3:14 |
| 10. | "Gerry's Ashes" | 4:28 |
| Total length: | | 38:29 |
