= Get in Where You Fit In (One Thousand Motels album) =

Get In Where You Fit In

Studio album by One Thousand Motels
- Released: April 30, 2021
- Recorded: 2021
- Genre: rock, gospel, soul, funk, blues
- Length: 48:33
- Label: Universal Music Group
- Producer: Chris Constantinou, Rat Scabies, Nicholas de Carlo

One Thousand Motels chronology
2% out of Sync (2020)	Get In Where You Fit In (2021)

Get In Where You Fit In is the second album by One Thousand Motels, a collaboration project of Rat Scabies (The Damned) and Chris Constantinou (The Wolfmen, Sinéad O'Connor, Adam Ant, The Mutants).

== Musicians ==
The album Get In Where You Fit In, was recorded between London, Memphis and Palm Springs. At its creation, besides Chris Constantinou and Rat Scabies, participated also the musicians Sean Wheeler (Josh Homme, Lemmy Kilmister, Robby Krieger) as vocalist, the guitarist Hal Lindes (Dire Straits), Marc Franklin and Arthur Edmaiston from Memphis on Horns (Aretha Franklin, Isaac Hayes, Snoop Dogg, Stevie Wonder) and Jonathan Moore with the First Street Choir from Mississippi. The musicians from London are the percussionist Preston Heyman (Kate Bush, Massive Attack, Terence Trent D'Arby), on harmonica Steve 'West' Weston (Roger Daltrey, Wilko Johnson), on slide guitar Dave Ahern, The Specials Brass Section & Su Robinson (The South Brass) and pianist Diz Watson (Dr. John).

== Reception ==
The album was noticed for its blend of gospel, soul, funk, blues, and rock with Deep South nuances. The lyrics (Chris Constantinou) are also eclectic and the vocalist Sean Wheeler was remarked for his immersion in a variety of styles. It received a 7/10 rating from Vive Le Rock, also noticing Wheeler's voice lending itself to a divergence of styles.

== Track listing ==
No.	Title	Length
1.	"When The Rabbit's Got The Gun"	2:46
2.	"Dark Harvest"	2:59
3.	"Brand New Headline"	2:19
4.	"Reel Me In"	2:05
5.	"God Is Good"	3:08
6.	"Spirit Flies Free"	3:05
7.	"Sing A Long"	3:46
8.	"Somewhere Else"	3:03
9.	"Zion"	2:50
10.	"Tell Me"	2:24
11.	"Let Me Know"	2:53
12.	"Blood Makes The Grass Grow Green"	3:19
13.	"Temptation"	3:02
14.	"Count On Me"	2:49
15.	"Never Forget - Redemption Mix"	3:47
16.	"Never Forget - Evil Guitar Mix"	4:09
Total length:		48:33
