= RudeGRL + CC =

Hip hop and punk music project

Background information
- Genres: Rap rock
- Years active: 2020–present
- Members: Jenna Dickens (aka RudeGRL, vocals); Chris Constantinou (bass guitar, guitar, harmonic, flute, backing vocals); Bunni Morretto (dancer)

RudeGRL + CC is a collaborative hip hop and punk project formed in 2020, consisting of Jenna Dickens (a.k.a. RudeGRL, from Basement Jaxx, Sub Focus) and Chris Constantinou (the Wolfmen, Sinéad O'Connor, Adam Ant, the Mutants, One Thousand Motels).

== History ==
Chris Constantinou and Jenna Dickens had some earlier collaboration in writing tracks for Sony, then in 2020 they started the project RudeGRL + CC. Jenna Dickens has a hip hop background and writes the lyrics and sings. Chris Constantinou has a punk rock background and writes and plays bass and guitar instruments and co-produces (Nicholas de Carlo co-produced the album, created the beats & synth arrangements and also mixed the album Like Wow). The runner-up to Miss Burlesque 2018 Bunni Morretto is a performance artist and visual element in the collaboration.

The music is described as a blend of post-punk/punk and hip-hop. In 2020, they released the album Anthemic Hip Hop (Universal Music), and one of its songs, "Helen Keller", won the 2020 PMA Best Hip Hop Track award. In September 2020, they released the EP Like Wow, noted for confronting subjects like racial abuse, homophobia, addiction, and sexual violence, but also for having a positive message of resilience and recovery. In January 2021, the band released the single Brand New Cadillac on Cleopatra Records, commented in reviews as an update with modern sonic textures of the 1959 classic rockabilly hit by Vince Taylor. In April 2021, they released the EP Killer 16.

Some of the band songs were featured by Iggy Pop and Amy Lamé on BBC 6.

== Discography ==
- Anthemic Hip Hop (2020)
- Like Wow (EP, 2020)
- "Brand New Cadillac" (single, 2021)
- Killer 16 (EP, 2021)
- Femme Power (EP, 2022)
- Dream Big Live Large Play Hard (2023)
- "I'm Good / Goody Two Shoes" (single, 2023)

== Awards ==
- 2020 PMA Best Hip Hop Track award for "Helen Keller"
