= Gary Gilmore's Eyes =

1977 single by the Adverts

Single by the Adverts

from the album Crossing the Red Sea with the Adverts
- B-side: "Bored Teenagers"
- Released: 1977
- Recorded: Pebble Beach Studios (Worthing)
- Genre: Punk rock
- Length: 2:13
- Label: Anchor
- Songwriter: T. V. Smith
- Producers: Larry Wallis; The Adverts

Music video
- "Gary Gilmore's Eyes" on YouTube

"Gary Gilmore's Eyes" is a single by the punk rock band the Adverts. The song reached No. 18 in the UK singles chart in September 1977 and earned the band an appearance on Top of the Pops.

It was originally intended to be included on the band's debut album, Crossing the Red Sea with the Adverts, but was dropped at the last minute. It has been included in most subsequent reissues of the album however.

== Background ==
The song was written from the point of view of a patient who has just undergone an eye transplant and discovers that he has received the eyes of the executed double murderer Gary Gilmore. Gilmore had requested that his eyes be donated to science after his execution as "they'd probably be the only body part usable".

After Gilmore's execution, several of his body parts were removed for possible use as transplants or for study. His corneas were used for transplants.

== Track listing ==
=== 1977 release ===
1. "Gary Gilmore's Eyes"
2. "Bored Teenagers"

=== 1983 release ===
1. "Gary Gilmore's Eyes"
2. "New Day Dawning"
3. "We Who Wait"

== Reception ==
The song was called "anthemic punk" by Matthew Gilbert of The Boston Globe and a "forgotten gem" by David Browne of Entertainment Weekly. Sounds described it as "the sickest and cleverest record to come out of the new wave: Single of the Week".

It was later included at No. 12 in Mojo's list of the best punk rock singles of all time.

The song was used in the soundtrack for Shot in the Heart, an HBO movie based on the memoir of the same name written by Gary Gilmore's brother, Mikal Gilmore, about his dysfunctional family and the eventual murder and execution.

== Cover versions ==
"Gary Gilmore's Eyes" was covered, in cooperation with Adverts frontman T. V. Smith, in 1991 by the German punk band Die Toten Hosen, appearing on their album Learning English, Lesson One. Smith later recorded another version of the song, backed by Die Toten Hosen, for his 2001 album Useless: The Very Best of T.V. Smith.

Finnish band Punk Lurex OK also covered the song, recorded in Finnish under the title "Tappajan Silmät" ("The Eyes of the Murderer"), and released it as a single in 1994. In 2000, Smith collaborated with Punk Lurex OK, recording another version of the song which was included on their joint EP, The Future Used to Be Better.

Smith released a live version of "Gary Gilmore's Eyes" on the 2009 album Live at the N.V.A. Ludwigsfelde, Germany.

Finnish ska band the Valkyrians released a version of "Gary Gilmore's Eyes", with Smith guesting, on their 2011 album Punkrocksteady.
