= Shot in the Heart =

1994 memoir by Mikal Gilmore

Shot in the Heart is a 1994 memoir written by Mikal Gilmore, then a senior contributing editor at Rolling Stone, about his tumultuous childhood in a dysfunctional family, and his brother Gary Gilmore's eventual execution by firing squad in 1977 for a murder he committed at a motel in Provo, Utah.

In 2001, Shot in the Heart became an HBO film directed by Agnieszka Holland, starring Giovanni Ribisi as Mikal, Elias Koteas as Gary, Sam Shepard as the brothers' father, Amy Madigan as their mother, and Lee Tergesen as Frank Gilmore, Jr.

The 1977 punk rock single "Gary Gilmore's Eyes" by the band The Adverts was used in the soundtrack of the movie. The song is written from "the point of view of a hospital patient who has received the eyes of Gary Gilmore in a transplant."
