= Crossing the Red Sea with The Adverts =

Crossing the Red Sea with the Adverts

Studio album by the Adverts
- Released: 17 February 1978
- Recorded: Late 1977
- Studio: Abbey Road, London
- Genre: Punk rock
- Length: 31:03
- Label: Bright
- Producer: John Leckie

The Adverts chronology
Crossing the Red Sea with the Adverts (1978)	Cast of Thousands (1979)

Singles from Crossing the Red Sea with The Adverts
- 1. "One Chord Wonders"/"Quick Step" Released: 29 April 1977; 2. "Safety in Numbers"/"We Who Wait" Released: 28 October 1977; 3. "No Time to Be 21"/"New Day Dawning" Released: 20 January 1978

Crossing the Red Sea with the Adverts is the debut studio album by English punk rock band the Adverts. It was released on 17 February 1978 by record label Bright.

== Background ==
Crossing the Red Sea with the Adverts was recorded at Abbey Road Studios. The album title was coined by Jane Suck.

== Release ==
The album was preceded by the single "No Time to Be 21", which reached No. 34 on the UK Singles Chart. Crossing the Red Sea with the Adverts reached No. 38 on the UK Albums Chart.

== Critical reception ==
Professional ratings
Review scores
Source	Rating
AllMusic	4.5/5 stars
Alternative Rock	10/10
The Great Rock Discography	6/10
The Rolling Stone Album Guide	4/5 stars
Spin Alternative Record Guide	9/10
Uncut	8/10

In a retrospective review for AllMusic, Dave Thompson called the album "a devastating debut" and "one of the finest albums not only of the punk era but of the 1970s as a whole". Trouser Press said that "in its own way", the album "is the equal of the first Sex Pistols or The Clash; a hasty statement that captures an exciting time".

== Legacy ==
In March 2003, Mojo magazine ranked Crossing the Red Sea No. 17 in its list of the 50 greatest punk albums. The album featured in The Guardian's list "1000 Albums to Hear Before You Die".

== Track listing ==
=== Original release ===
All tracks are written by T. V. Smith.

Side A
No.	Title	Length
1.	"One Chord Wonders"
2.	"Bored Teenagers"
3.	"New Church"
4.	"On the Roof"
5.	"Newboys"
6.	"Bombsite Boy"

Side B
No.	Title	Length
1.	"No Time to Be 21"
2.	"Safety in Numbers"
3.	"Drowning Men"
4.	"On Wheels"
5.	"Great British Mistake"

=== 2002 re-issue ===
No.	Title	Length
1.	"One Chord Wonders"	2:49
2.	"Bored Teenagers"	1:45
3.	"New Church"	2:26
4.	"On the Roof"	3:01
5.	"Newboys"	3:13
6.	"Gary Gilmore's Eyes"	2:16
7.	"Bombsite Boy"	3:27
8.	"No Time to Be 21"	2:36
9.	"Safety in Numbers"	3:15
10.	"New Day Dawns"	2:40
11.	"Drowning Men"	2:18
12.	"On Wheels"	3:17
13.	"Great British Mistake"	3:48
Total length:		36:51

== Personnel ==
The Adverts

- T. V. Smith – vocals
- Gaye Advert – bass guitar, vocals
- Howard Pickup – guitar, vocals
- Laurie Driver – drums

Technical

- John Leckie – production
- Nicholas De Ville – design
- Martin Durrant – cover photography
