= Cast of Thousands (The Adverts album) =

Studio album by the Adverts
- Released: 1979
- Studio: The Manor (Shipton-on-Cherwell, England); The Barge on Regent's Canal, London
- Genre: New wave, punk rock
- Label: RCA
- Producer: Tom Newman

The Adverts chronology
Crossing the Red Sea with the Adverts (1978)	Cast of Thousands (1979)

Cast of Thousands is the second and final studio album by the English band the Adverts, released in 1979. It featured a noticeably different, more experimental sound than their debut effort, Crossing the Red Sea with the Adverts.

== Background ==
The album was produced by Tom Newman (known for his work on Mike Oldfield's Tubular Bells). Doctors of Madness frontman Richard Strange guested on synthesizer on the title track.

== Reception ==
Professional ratings
Review scores
Source	Rating
AllMusic	4/5 stars
Spin Alternative Record Guide	2/10

Contemporary critics were generally dismissive of the album and the band's change of direction, but it has since been reevaluated.

Writing for AllMusic, critic Dave Thompson said, "A flagrant departure from even the most extreme expectations, Cast of Thousands not only cast the band adrift from the new wave mainstream, but it would also alienate all but the most adaptable of the band's following".

A retrospective review in The Quietus noted that the album was still not "an easy listen", but praised the "wild, free and comparatively sophisticated" version of the band, and called the title track a "thrilling, rolling, tumbling, swirling mess of adventure and hope".

Henry Rollins is a fan of the band, and of this album in particular. “The record shows the band’s ability to mesh pop hooks and still hold an edge. Besides The Clash, none of their peers at the time had the chops or the guts to do such work. Cast of Thousands is a brave and cool album.

"Ian MacKaye and I found the Adverts' great "Safety in Numbers"/"We Who Wait" single in a record store many years ago and played it over and over, amazed at what a great band we had found. I still listen to the Adverts and follow TV Smith's ongoing musical journey with great interest and as long as he keeps showing up, so will I".

== Track listing ==
All tracks composed by T. V. Smith

1. "Cast of Thousands" - 5:26
2. "The Adverts" - 3:06
3. "My Place" - 2:49
4. "Male Assault" - 2:26
5. "Television's Over" - 3:17
6. "Fate of Criminals" - 3:09
7. "Love Songs" - 2:27
8. "I Surrender" - 3:02
9. "I Looked at the Sun" - 4:15
10. "I Will Walk You Home" - 4:04

== Personnel ==
The Adverts

- T. V. Smith – vocals, guitar
- Gaye Advert – bass
- Howard Pickup – guitar, vocals
- Rod Latter – drums
- Tim Cross – piano, synthesizer

with:

- Richard Strange – synthesizer on "Cast of Thousands"
- Tom Newman – synthesizer on "I Will Walk You Home"
