= Mikal Gilmore =

American writer and music journalist

Mikal Gilmore (born 1951) is an American writer and music journalist, who is also known for being the younger brother of convicted murderer Gary Gilmore.

== Early life ==
Gilmore was born in 1951 to Frank and Bessie Gilmore. He has three brothers, Gary, Gaylen, and Frank Jr. His older brother, Gary Gilmore, gained notoriety as a convicted murderer.

== Career ==
In the 1970s Gilmore began writing music articles and criticism for Rolling Stone magazine. In 1999, his Night Beat: A Shadow History of Rock and Roll was published by Anchor. In July 2009, he released Stories Done: Writings on the 1960s and its Discontents. It was published by Free Press.

=== Memoir ===
Gilmore's brother, Gary, (December 4, 1940 – January 17, 1977) was an American criminal who gained international attention for demanding the implementation of his death sentence for two murders he committed in Utah. After the U.S. Supreme Court upheld a new series of death penalty statutes in the 1976 decision Gregg v. Georgia, he became the first person in almost ten years to be executed in the United States.

In 1994, Mikal Gilmore published a memoir titled Shot in the Heart, detailing his relationship with Gary and their often troubled family, starting with the original Mormon settlers and continuing through to Gary's execution and its aftermath. Shot in the Heart received positive reviews, including a comment by New York Times critic Michiko Kakutani calling the book "Remarkable, astonishing... Shot in the Heart reads like a combination of Brothers Karamazov and a series of Johnny Cash ballads... chilling, heartbreaking, and alarming." That year, Shot in the Heart won the Los Angeles Times Book Prize and the National Book Critics Circle Award.

In 2001, Shot in the Heart became an HBO film starring Giovanni Ribisi as Mikal, Elias Koteas as Gary, Sam Shepard as the brothers' father and Lee Tergesen as Frank Gilmore, Jr. The 1977 punk rock single "Gary Gilmore's Eyes" by the band The Adverts was used in the soundtrack of the movie. The song is written from "the point of view of a hospital patient who has received the eyes of Gary Gilmore in a transplant."
