= I Delete =

Studio album by T. V. Smith
- Released: 2014
- Label: TVS
- Producer: T. V. Smith

T. V. Smith chronology
Acoustic Sessions Volume 1 (2013)	I Delete (2014)	Land of the Overdose (2018)

Professional ratings
Review scores
Source	Rating
Loud and Quiet	4/10
Record Collector	3/5 stars
The Skinny	3/5 stars

I Delete is the 16th album released by T. V. Smith on November 17, 2014.

== Track listing ==
All tracks composed by T. V. Smith

1. "Replay"
2. "I Delete"
3. "First One to Sign Up"
4. "Long Gone"
5. "Cutbacks"
6. "London Hum"
7. "Festival of Fools"
8. "It Don't Work"
9. "Home Time"
10. "A Step Back"

== Personnel ==
- T. V. Smith - guitar, keyboards, vocals
- B.B. Quattro - bass, backing vocals
- Steve "Vom" Ritchie - drums, percussion
