= Hiljaiset Levyt =

Finnish independent record label

Hiljaiset Levyt is an independent record label from Finland. It was founded in the mid-1980s by Jukka Junttila. Hiljaiset Levyt is based in Tampere.

Hiljaiset Levyt is in specializing in punk, but has put out other kinds of music.

Hiljaiset Levyt is the longest continues publishing independent record label in Finland.

== Artists ==
- Alice in Wasteland
- Alivaltiosihteeri
- Attila the Stockbroker
- Burning Pipe Harmony
- Butchers
- Charming Disappointment
- Danny Punk
- Garbagemen
- God's Lonely Men
- Hundred Million Martians
- Jahnukaiset
- Jalla Jalla
- Johnny Spunky
- Juggling Jugulars
- Kamikaze Pilots
- Kätyrit
- Lowdown Shakin' Chills
- Maaseudun Tulevaisuus
- Mahtavat Lämpöpussit
- Many Hates
- Mickey Jupp
- Mothers Against Sex Association
- Mäkkelä
- Neva
- Nightingales
- Phantom Tones
- Punk Lurex OK
- Ravin' Seeds
- Rehtorit
- Room 100
- Tina
- T. V. Smith
- Underclass
- Uutiset ja Sää
- Viewmasters
- Wolfmen
- Zägä Box

== See also ==
- List of record labels
