= Modernity Killed Every Night =

Studio album by The Wolfmen
- Released: 1 September 2008
- Recorded: Raezor Studios
- Genre: Post-punk, alternative rock, rock, glam rock, pop
- Label: Damaged Goods

The Wolfmen chronology
Modernity Killed Every Night (2008)	Married to the Eiffel Tower (2011)

Singles from Modernity Killed Every Night
- 1. "Cecilie" Released: 2007; 2. "Jackie Says" Released: 2008; 3. "Needle in the Camel’s Eye" Released: 5 May 2008

Modernity Killed Every Night is the debut studio album by The Wolfmen, released in the United Kingdom on 1 September 2008.

== Reception ==
Modernity Killed Every Night has garnered glowing reviews from music critics. One example being the musicOMH review, which hailed the debut as "a warm, energetic and superbly crafted album from a band that knows exactly how to make it all sound wonderfully effortless." Insound stated that the album is "a delicious collision of glam rock and punk rock".

== Track listing ==
1. Needle in the Camel's Eye
2. Jackie Says
3. Cecilie
4. While London Sleeps
5. Love Is A Dog
6. Up All Nighter
7. Better Days
8. Wak This Bass
9. Buzz Me Kate
10. If You Talk Like That
11. Je T'aime Madame
