= One Thousand Motels =

Music duo

Background information
- Genres: rock, psychedelia, punk, funk, blues, rock and roll
- Years active: 2020–present
- Members: Chris Constantinou (multi-instrumentalist); Rat Scabies (drums)
- Website: onethousandmotels.com

One Thousand Motels is a collaboration duo of Rat Scabies (The Damned) and Chris Constantinou (The Wolfmen, Sinéad O'Connor, Adam Ant, The Mutants).

== History ==
The bassist/multi-instrumentalist Chris Constantinou and drum legend Rat Scabies collaborated for some years as core members of The Mutants rock supergroup. When making the fourth Mutants album, Rat noticed also some other demos Chris was working on and this turned into the project One Thousand Motels, involving only the two of them (quicker and easier to put in practice, considering the logistics around The Mutants musicians as a supergroup).

Their music is characterized by Vive Le Rock as "upbeat rock songs with a twist in the lyrical tail" and by Midlands Rock as "a match seemingly made in rock ‘n’ roll heaven (or a punky purgatory)". In 2020, they released the album 2% out of Sync, described in reviews as forging new ground. The album was co-produced and mixed by Nicholas de Carlo. In April 2026, the album was re-released on limited edition trans smoke green vinyl through FOAD Musick and digitally through Cherry Red Records. Five official music videos have been released from this album: "Definition", "I Like Sex In The Suburbs", "2% Out", "Kill Me If You Love Me", "Gerry's Ashes".

The second album Get In Where You Fit In was released in April 2021, with Sean Wheeler (Josh Homme, Lemmy Kilmister, Robby Krieger) as vocalist. At its creation also participated American musicians like guitarist Hal Lindes (Dire Straits), Marc Franklin and Arthur Edmaiston from Memphis on Horns (Aretha Franklin, Isaac Hayes, Snoop Dogg, Stevie Wonder) and Jonathan Moore with the First Street Choir from Mississippi. The musicians from London are the percussionist Preston Heyman (Kate Bush, Massive Attack, Terence Trent D'Arby), on harmonica Steve 'West' Weston (Roger Daltrey, Wilko Johnson), on slide guitar Dave Ahern, The Specials Brass Section & Su Robinson (The South Brass) and pianist Diz Watson (Dr. John). The album was noticed for its blend of gospel, soul, funk, blues, and rock with Deep South nuances.

A third album is in production with Nicholas De Carlo.

== Discography ==
- 2% out of Sync (2020)
- Get In Where You Fit In (2021)
