= Objectophilia =

Sexual or romantic attraction towards objects

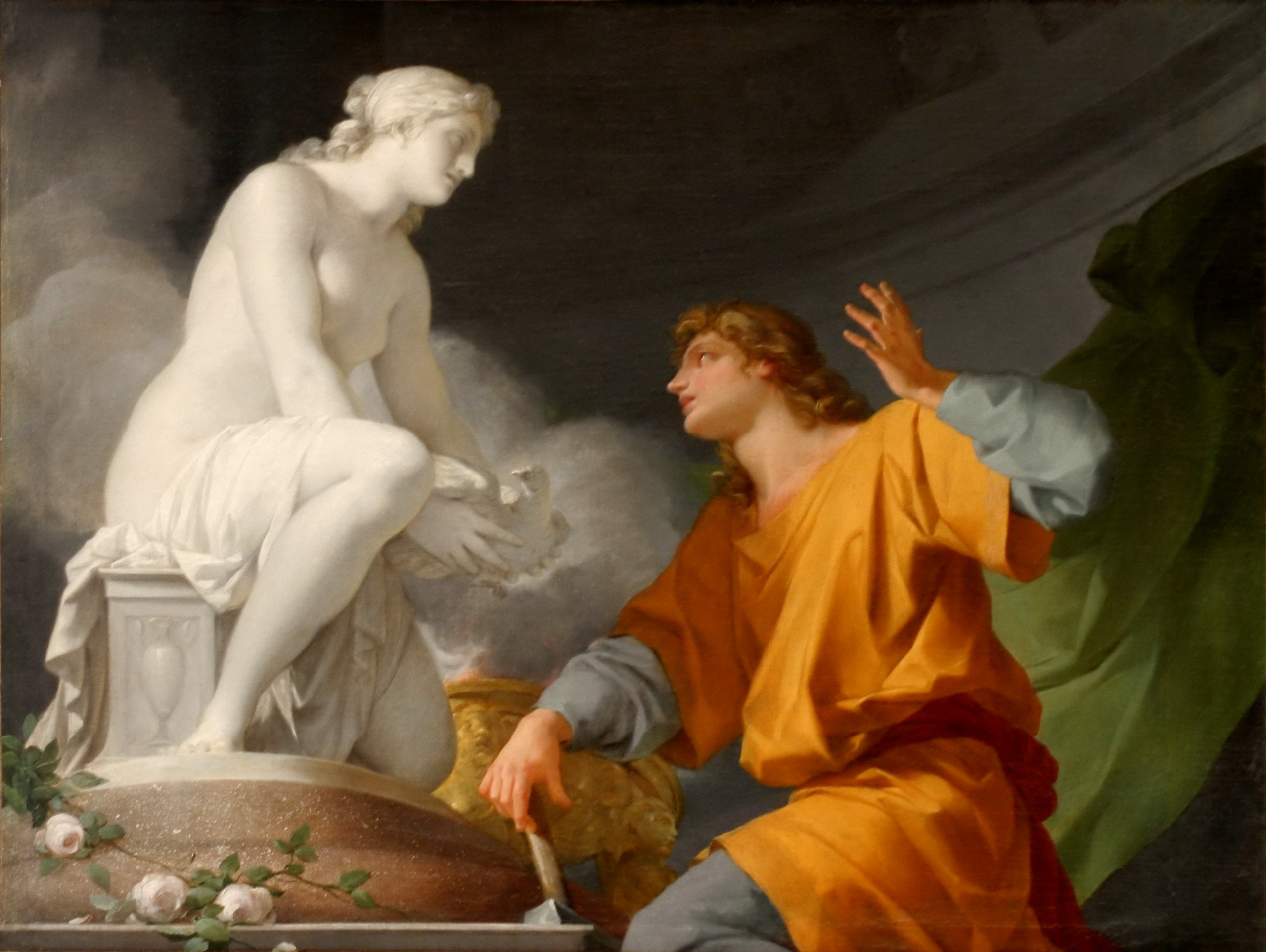
The Origin of Sculpture by Jean-Baptiste Regnault, 1786, Musée national du château et des Trianons. In Greek mythology, Pygmalion was a sculptor who fell in love with a statue he carved.

Object sexuality, also known as objectum sexuality (simply objectum) or objectophilia, is a group of paraphilias characterized by sexual or romantic attraction focused on particular inanimate objects. Individuals with this attraction may have strong feelings of love and commitment to certain items or structures of their fixation. Some do not desire sexual or close emotional relationships with humans. Object-sexual individuals also often believe in animism, and sense reciprocation based on the belief that objects have souls, intelligence, feelings, and the ability to communicate. Given that inanimate objects are inert and not harmed through object sexuality, most questions of objectophilia's legality or ethical provenance have not arisen. Public sexual consummation of object-sexual desires may be dealt with through public nudity or anti-exhibitionism legislation.

Object-sexual individuals have a variety of different experiences based on who they are. Some see the objects that they are attracted to as having a gender, and within that category of people, the object's gender can be interpreted either by what the object means to them or by some other means. Other things that differ between individuals are relationship styles, which can be monogamous or polyamorous, communication styles with the objects, and intimacy challenges based on the distance between the person and the object.

== Research ==
In 2009, Amy Marsh, a clinical sexologist, surveyed the twenty-one English-speaking members of Erika Eiffel's 40-member OS Internationale group about their experiences. About half reported autism spectrum disorders: six had been diagnosed, four were affected but not diagnosed, and three of the remaining nine reported having "some traits." According to Marsh, "The emotions and experiences reported by OS people correspond to general definitions of sexual orientation," such as that in an APA article "on sexual orientation and homosexuality ... [which] refers to sexual orientation as involving 'feelings and self-concept'".

The first empirical behavioural study was conducted in 2019 by neuropsychologist Julia Simner and her colleagues. Their data suggests that objectophilia is likely to arise when two separate neurodevelopmental traits co-occur: autism and synaesthesia. Rates of diagnosed autism were up to 30 times higher in their objectophile group, particularly linked to differences in social skills (finding human social situations unenjoyable). At the same time, the objectophile group were 14 times more likely to have synaesthesia. This included the variant known as personification synaesthesia, which makes inanimate objects feel imbued with personalities or genders (due to neurodevelopmental differences in regions of the brain involved in social processing). The researchers concluded that OS often encapsulates autism and synaesthesia within its phenomenology, and they also discussed society's marginalization of objectophiles.

Sociolinguistic researcher Heiko Motschenbacher has developed the concept of humanonormativity to describe the marginalization of objectum sexuality. Humanonormativity is "the belief that people normally and naturally engage in sexual practices and romantic relationships with other human beings." It arises as a discourse that pathologizes objectum sexuality. This concept has been referenced in relevant academic fields, including research on fictosexuality.

== OS awareness and advocacy ==
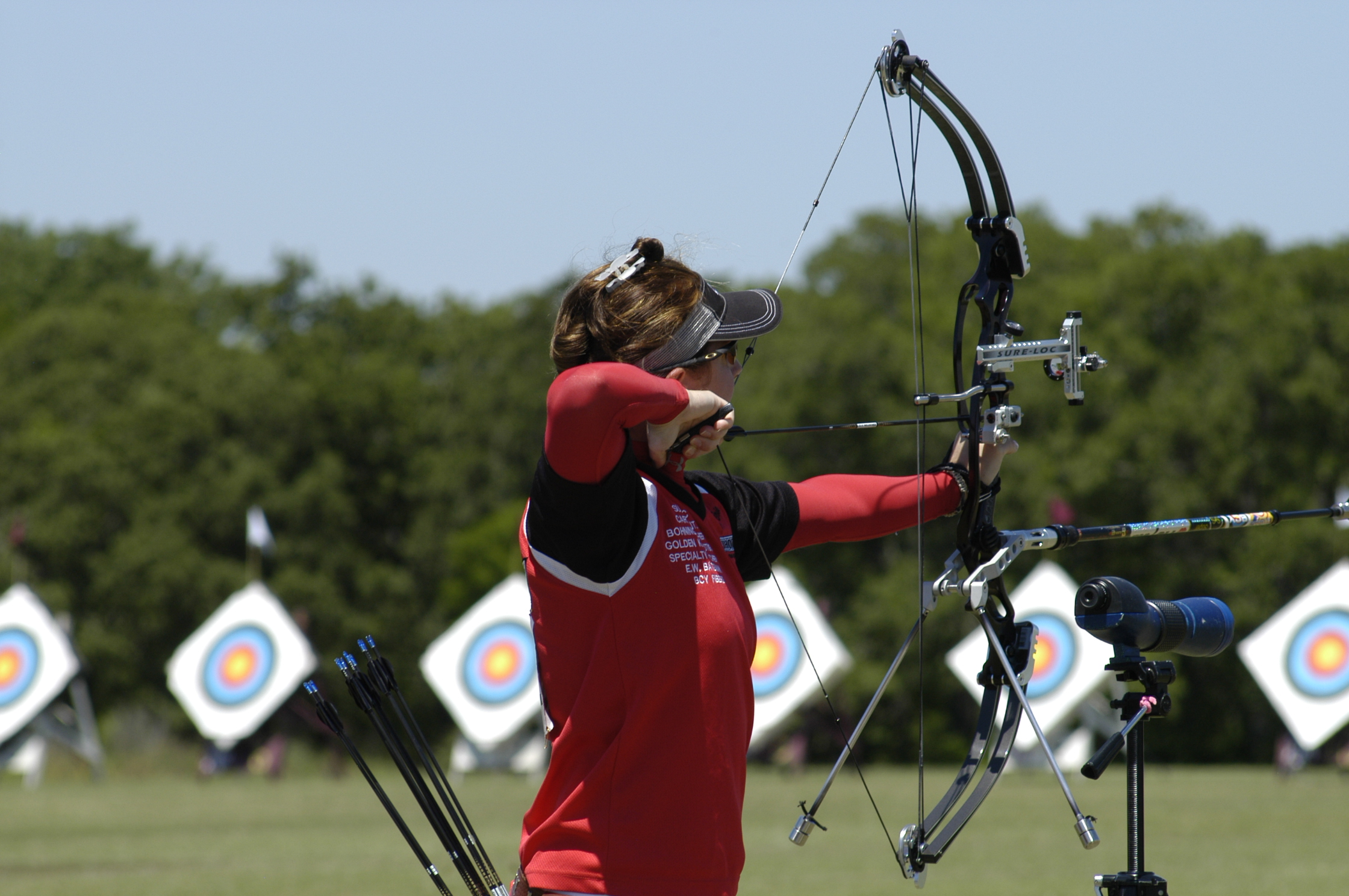
Erika Eiffel, an OS advocate

In 2009, Erika Eiffel appeared on Good Morning America and The Tyra Banks Show with Amy Marsh to discuss her marriage to the Eiffel Tower and how her object love helped her become a world champion archer. Marsh shared the results of her survey and her belief that OS could be a genuine sexual orientation, reasoning that if childhood trauma were a factor in being OS, there would be more OS individuals. Eiffel, who had adopted her surname after a 2007 marriage to the Eiffel Tower, founded OS Internationale, an educational website and online community for those identifying or researching attraction to objects.

== Literature ==
Marsh sees OS-like behavior in classic literature. In Victor Hugo's 1831 novel The Hunchback of Notre-Dame:

[Quasimodo] loved [the bells], caressed them, talked to them, understood them. From the carillon in the steeple of the transept to the great bell over the doorway, they all shared his love. Claude Frollo had made him the bell ringer of Notre-Dame, and to give the great bell in marriage to Quasimodo was to give Juliet to Romeo.

Describing his passion for sculptures, Horace Walpole commented in 1791 that "Sir William Hamilton had actually married his Gallery of Statues".

Kate Folk’s 2025 experimental debut novel Sky Daddy follows Linda, a woman convinced she and her soulmate, a commercial jet plane, will marry one day, that is, be united in death via crash. With the aid of a domino-sized 737 fragment, she is aroused during takeoff and turbulence (the latter of which she interprets as a sign of a plane’s affection), as well as when watching simulations of aeronautic disasters.

== Film ==
Many films cover Objectum Sexuality.

Documentaries:

- Animism: People Who Love Objects
- Married to the Eiffel Tower
- My Car is My Lover

Fiction:

- Crash (1996)
- Titane
- Jumbo
- Lars and the Real Girl
- Electric Dreams

== See also ==
- Agalmatophilia – Inanimate object fetishism
- Animism – Class of religious beliefs
- Doll fetish – Inanimate object fetishism
- Erotic target location error – Hypothesized dimension for paraphilias
- Fictosexuality – Attraction to fictional characters
- List of paraphilias
- Mechanophilia – Sexual attraction to machines, a paraphilia involving sexual attraction towards machines, particularly vehicles
- Paraphilia – Atypical sexual attraction
- Plushophilia – Stuffed toy fetishism
- Sexual fetishism – Sexual arousal a person receives from an object or situation
- Shoe fetishism – Erotic attraction to shoes
- Anthropomorphism – Attribution of human traits to non-human entities
