= Gary Gilmore =

American murderer (1940–1977)

- Portland Police Bureau mugshots
- Born: Faye Robert Coffman; December 4, 1940; McCamey, Texas, U.S.
- Died: January 17, 1977 (aged 36); Utah State Prison, Utah, U.S.
- Relatives: Mikal Gilmore (brother)
- Status: Executed by firing squad
- Convictions: Oregon; Motor vehicle theft (2 counts); Armed robbery (3 counts); Assault (2 counts); Utah; First degree murder (1 count)
- Penalty: Death (October 7, 1976)

Details
- Victims: 2
- Date: July 19 & 20, 1976
- State: Utah
- Locations: Orem; Provo
- Date apprehended: July 21, 1976

Gary Mark Gilmore (born Faye Robert Coffman; December 4, 1940 – January 17, 1977) was an American criminal who gained international attention for demanding the implementation of his death sentence for two murders he had admitted to committing in Utah. After the U.S. Supreme Court upheld a new series of death penalty statutes in the 1976 decision Gregg v. Georgia, he became the first person in almost ten years to be executed in the United States. These new statutes avoided the problems under the 1972 decision in Furman v. Georgia, which had resulted in earlier death penalty statutes being deemed "cruel and unusual" punishment, and therefore unconstitutional (the Supreme Court had previously ordered all states to commute death sentences to life imprisonment after Furman). Gilmore was executed by a firing squad in 1977. His life and execution were the subject of the 1979 nonfiction novel The Executioner's Song, by Norman Mailer, and the 1982 TV film of the novel starring Tommy Lee Jones as Gilmore.

== Early life ==
Gary Mark Gilmore was born in McCamey, Texas, on December 4, 1940, the second of four sons, to Frank and Bessie Gilmore. The other sons were Frank Jr., Gaylen, and the writer and music journalist Mikal Gilmore. Frank Harry Gilmore, an alcoholic con man, had other wives and families, none of whom he supported. On a whim, he married Bessie (née Brown), an outcast from Provo, Utah, in Sacramento, California. Gary was born while they were living in Texas under the pseudonym of Coffman to avoid the law. Frank christened his son Faye Robert Coffman, but once they left Texas, Bessie changed it to Gary Mark. This name change proved to be a sore point years later. Frank's mother, Fay, kept the original "Faye Coffman" birth certificate, and when Gary found it two decades later, he assumed he must be either illegitimate or someone else's son. He seized on this as the reason that he and his father never got along; he became very upset and walked out on his mother when she tried to explain the name change to him.

The theme of illegitimacy, real or imagined, was common in the Gilmore family. Frank Sr.'s mother, Fay Gilmore, once told Bessie that Frank Sr.'s father was a famous magician who had passed through Sacramento, where she was living. Bessie researched this at the library and concluded that Frank was the illegitimate son of Harry Houdini. Houdini was only sixteen years old in 1890, the year of Frank Gilmore's birth, and did not begin his career as a magician until the following year. Whether Fay meant that Frank Sr.'s father was someone who would later become known as a famous magician is unknown. Mikal Gilmore, Gary's youngest brother, believes the story to be false, but has stated that both his father and mother believed it. Gary's oldest brother, Frank Jr, was the illegitimate son of Robert Ingram, who was Frank Sr's son from an earlier marriage. Ingram had a brief affair with Bessie shortly after she had married his father. Frank Sr had believed Gary was the illegitimate son.

During Gary's childhood, the family frequently relocated throughout the Western United States, with Frank supporting them by selling fake magazine subscriptions. Gary had a troubled relationship with his father, whom his youngest brother Mikal described as a "cruel and unreasonable man." Frank Gilmore Sr. was strict and quick to anger, and would often whip his sons, Frank Jr., Gary, and Gaylen, with a razor strop, whip, or a belt for little or no reason. Less often, he would beat his wife. He mellowed somewhat with age: Mikal reported that Frank whipped him only once, and never did it again after Mikal told him, "I hate you." In addition, Frank and Bessie would argue loudly and verbally abuse each other. Frank would anger Bessie by calling her crazy, and mock Brigham Young, the second president and prophet of the Church of Jesus Christ of Latter-day Saints, with the pejorative "Bring 'em Young". Bessie would retaliate by calling him a "Cat-licker" [Catholic] and threatening to kill him some night. This abuse continued for years and caused considerable turmoil within the Gilmore family.

In 1952, the Gilmore family settled in Portland, Oregon. As an adolescent, Gary began engaging in petty crime. Although Gilmore had an IQ test score of 133, gained high scores on both aptitude and achievement tests, and showed artistic talent, he dropped out of high school in the ninth grade. He ran away from home with a friend to Texas, returning to Portland after several months.

== Crimes ==
At the age of 14, Gary started a small car theft ring with friends, which resulted in his first arrest. He was released to his father with a warning. Two weeks later, he was back in court on another car theft charge. The court remanded him to the MacLaren Reform School for Boys in Woodburn, Oregon, from which he was released the following year. He was sent to Oregon State Correctional Institution on another car theft charge in 1960 and was released later that year.

In 1961, Frank Sr., Gary's father, was diagnosed with terminal lung cancer; he died at the end of July 1962, while Gary was in Rocky Butte Jail in Portland, facing charges of driving without a license. A jail guard told Gary when his father died. Despite his dysfunctional relationship with his father, Gary was devastated and tried to kill himself by slitting his wrists. After his father died, Gilmore got into more and more trouble, as he became more erratic and was frequently drunk. He faced assault and armed robbery charges again in 1964 and was given a 15-year prison sentence as a habitual offender and sent to the Oregon State Penitentiary in Salem, Oregon. A prison psychiatrist diagnosed him with antisocial personality disorder with intermittent psychotic decompensation. He was granted conditional release in 1972 to live weekdays in a halfway house in Eugene, Oregon, and study art at a community college. Gilmore never registered and, within a month, he was arrested and convicted of armed robbery.

Due to his violent behavior in prison, Gilmore was transferred in 1975 from Oregon to the federal prison in Marion, Illinois, at the time a maximum security facility.

Gilmore was conditionally paroled in April 1976 and went to Provo, Utah, to live with a distant cousin, Brenda Nicol, who tried to help him find work. Gilmore worked briefly at his uncle Vern Damico's shoe repair shop and then for an insulation company owned by Spencer McGrath, but he soon returned to his previous lifestyle of stealing, drinking, and fighting. Gilmore, then 35, had a relationship with Nicole Barrett Baker (later Nicole Barrett Henry), a 19-year-old who had been married twice before and had two young children. The relationship was at first casual, but soon became intense and strained due to Gilmore's aggressive behavior and pressure from Baker's family to prevent her from seeing him.

=== Murders ===
On the evening of July 19, 1976, Gilmore robbed and murdered 25-year-old Max Jensen, a gas station employee in Orem, Utah. The next evening, he robbed and murdered 26-year-old Bennie Bushnell, a motel manager in Provo. Although both men had complied with his demands, he murdered them. The young men were each ordered to lie down and then were shot in the head. Both were students at Brigham Young University; both left widows with infants. While disposing of the .22 caliber pistol used in both killings, Gilmore accidentally shot himself in his right hand, leaving a trail of blood to the service garage where he had left his truck to be repaired prior to murdering Bennie Bushnell. Garage mechanic Michael Simpson witnessed Gilmore hiding the gun in the bushes. Seeing the blood on Gilmore's crudely bandaged right hand when he approached to pay for the repairs to his truck, and hearing on a police scanner of the shooting at the nearby motel, Simpson wrote down Gilmore's license plate number and called the police. Gilmore's cousin, Brenda, turned him in to police shortly after he phoned her asking for bandages and painkillers for the injury to his hand. The Utah State Police apprehended Gilmore as he tried to drive out of Provo, and he gave up without attempting to flee. Although he was charged with the murders of Jensen and Bushnell, the Jensen case was never brought to trial, apparently due to there being no eyewitnesses.

== Trial ==
Gilmore's murder trial began at the Provo courthouse on October 5, 1976, and lasted two days. Peter Arroyo, a motel guest, testified that he saw Gilmore in the motel registration office that night. After taking the money, Gilmore ordered Bushnell to lie down on the floor and then shot him. Gerald F. Wilkes, an FBI ballistics expert, matched the two shell casings and the bullet that killed Bushnell to the gun hidden in the bush, and a patrolman testified that he had traced Gilmore's trail of blood to that same bush. Gilmore's two court-appointed lawyers, Michael Esplin and Craig Snyder, made no attempt to cross-examine the majority of the state's witnesses and rested without calling any witnesses for the defense. Gilmore protested and the following day asked the judge if he could take the stand in his own defense, perhaps arguing that due to the dissociation and lack of control he felt at the time, he had a good case for insanity. His attorneys presented the findings of four separate psychiatrists, all of whom had said that Gilmore was aware of what he was doing and that he knew it was wrong at the time. While he did have an antisocial personality disorder, which may have been aggravated by drinking and drugs, he did not meet the legal criteria for insanity. Gilmore withdrew his request. During closing statements, Esplin did mention that since Gilmore had accidentally shot himself, he might have accidentally killed Bushnell. Mentioning the lack of witnesses to the shooting, he asked the jury to find Gilmore guilty of second-degree murder or even acquit him. On October 7, the jury retired to deliberate and by mid-day, they had returned with a guilty verdict for first-degree murder. Later that day, the jury unanimously recommended a death sentence due to the special circumstances of the crime.

Gilmore chose to not pursue habeas corpus relief in federal court. His mother, Bessie, sued for a stay of execution on his behalf. In a five-to-four decision, the US Supreme Court refused to hear his mother's claim. The court's per curiam opinion said that the defendant had waived his rights by not pursuing them. At the time, Utah had two methods of execution—firing squad or hanging. Believing a hanging could be botched, Gilmore chose the former, declaring, "I'd prefer to be shot." The execution was set for November 15 at 8:00 a.m.

Against his expressed wishes, Gilmore received several stays of execution through the efforts of the American Civil Liberties Union (ACLU). The last of these occurred just hours before the rescheduled execution date of January 17. That stay was overturned at 7:30 a.m., and the execution was allowed to proceed as planned. At a board of pardons hearing in November 1976, Gilmore said of the efforts by the ACLU and others to prevent his execution: "They always want to get in on the act. I don't think they have ever really done anything effective in their lives. I would like them all—including that group of reverends and rabbis from Salt Lake City—to butt out. This is my life and this is my death. It's been sanctioned by the courts that I die and I accept that."

During the time Gilmore was on death row awaiting his execution, he attempted suicide twice; the first time on November 16 after the first stay was issued, and again one month later on December 16.

== Execution ==
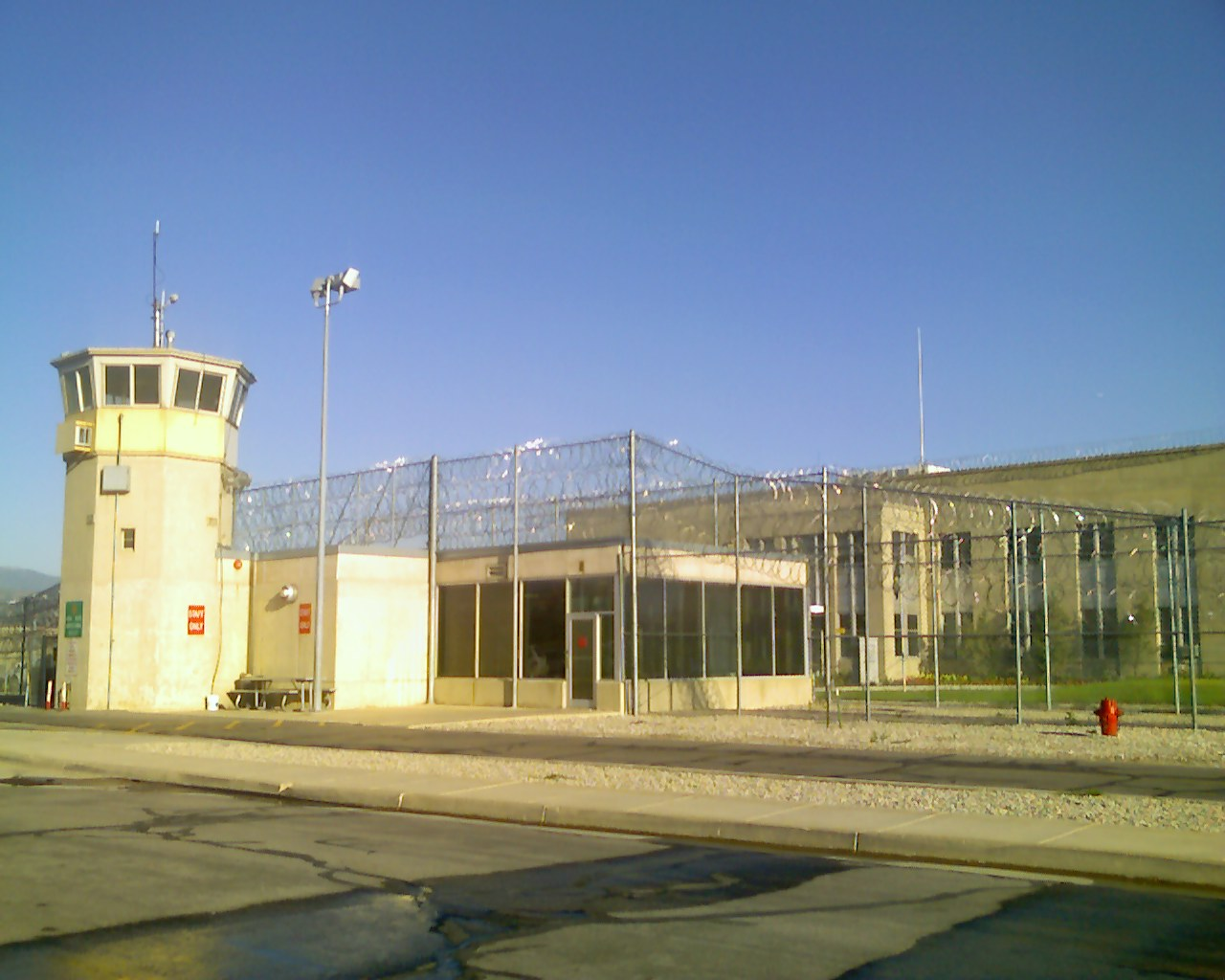
Gilmore was executed by firing squad at Utah State Prison.

A reenactment of the execution

Gilmore was executed on January 17, 1977, at 8:07 a.m. by firing squad at the Utah State Prison in Draper, Utah.

On the morning of his execution, Gilmore was transported to an abandoned cannery behind the prison, which served as its death house. He was strapped to a chair, with a wall of sandbags placed behind him to trap the bullets. Five local police officers stood concealed behind a curtain with five small holes, through which they aimed their rifles. When asked for any last words, Gilmore simply replied, "Let's do it." The Rev. Thomas Meersman, the Catholic prison chaplain, administered the last rites to Gilmore. After the prison physician cloaked him in a black hood, Gilmore uttered his last words to Meersman: "Dominus vobiscum" (Latin, translation: "The Lord be with you.") Meersman replied, "Et cum spiritu tuo" ("And with your spirit.")

In Utah, firing squads consisted of five volunteer law enforcement officers from the county in which the conviction of the offender took place. The five executioners were equipped with .30-30-caliber rifles and off-the-shelf Winchester 150-grain (9.7 g) SilverTip ammunition. Gilmore was restrained and hooded, and the shots were fired at a distance of 20 feet (6.1 m), aiming at the chest.

Prison officials stated that the firing squad comprised four men with live rounds, and one with a blank, so that the shooters could not be certain as to who fired the fatal shots. However, upon inspecting the clothes worn by his brother Gary at his execution, Mikal Gilmore noted five holes in the shirt. According to his memoir Shot in the Heart, "the state of Utah, apparently, had taken no chances on the morning that it put my brother to death."

Gilmore had requested that some of his organs be donated for transplant purposes. Within hours of the execution, two people received his corneas. His body was sent for autopsy and was cremated later that day. The following day, after a memorial service at Walker Mortuary, his ashes were scattered from an airplane over Spanish Fork, Utah.

== Representation in the media ==
As Gilmore was the first person in the United States executed since the reinstatement of the death penalty in 1976, his story had immense cultural resonance at the time.

Before his execution, the December 11, 1976, episode of NBC's Saturday Night Live (Season 2, Episode 10) featured guest host Candice Bergen and the cast singing a Christmas-themed medley entitled "Let's Kill Gary Gilmore for Christmas." Dressed in winter attire and surrounded by fake snow, the performers sang the medley of familiar Christmas carols with altered lyrics. Lyrics set to "Winter Wonderland" included this line: "In the meadow we can build a snowman / One with Gary Gilmore packed inside / We'll ask him, 'Are you dead yet?' He'll say, 'No, man' / But we'll wait out the frostbite till he dies." A later episode of Saturday Night Live, on October 20, 1979, featured guest host Eric Idle performing impersonations while strapped to a stretcher, assisted by orderlies. With the stretcher standing on end, Idle covered his eyes with a black blindfold and announced it as an impersonation of Gary Gilmore.

In 1977 the British punk band the Adverts issued a single, "Gary Gilmore's Eyes", which reached #18 on the U.K. charts, inspired by the fact that Gilmore's corneas were donated and used as organ transplants after his death. The song was covered several times down to 2011.

The founder of advertising agency Wieden+Kennedy, Dan Wieden, credits the inspiration for his "Just Do It" Nike slogan to Gilmore's last words.

Norman Mailer wrote a novel, The Executioner's Song, based on Gilmore's life; it won the Pulitzer Prize. Notable for its portrayal of Gilmore and the anguish surrounding the murders he committed, the book expressed Mailer's thinking about the national debate over the revival of capital punishment.

Another writer to blend fact with fiction was Colombian writer Rafael Chaparro Madiedo, who featured Gilmore as one of the main characters of his 1992 novel Opio en las Nubes (Opium in the Clouds) which won the National Prize.

In 1982, The Executioner's Song was adapted by Mailer for a television movie of the same name starring Tommy Lee Jones as Gilmore, and co-starring Christine Lahti, Eli Wallach, and Rosanna Arquette. Jones won an Emmy Award for his portrayal of Gilmore.

Artist Matthew Barney's film Cremaster 2 (1999), featured Gilmore as the main character, played by Barney; it was the second of five films in the series The Cremaster Cycle. At the beginning of Cremaster 3, a metamorphosed character corresponding to Gilmore is played by Nesrin Karanouh.

Gary's brother Mikal Gilmore, an American writer and music journalist, wrote a memoir in 1994 entitled Shot in the Heart, detailing his relationship with Gary and their often troubled family, starting with the original Mormon settlers and continuing through to Gary's execution and its aftermath. Shot in the Heart received positive reviews, including a comment by New York Times critic Michiko Kakutani calling the book "Remarkable, astonishing... Shot in the Heart reads like a combination of Brothers Karamazov and a series of Johnny Cash ballads... chilling, heartbreaking, and alarming." In 1994 Shot in the Heart won the Los Angeles Times Book Prize and the National Book Critics Circle Award. In 2001, Shot in the Heart became an HBO film starring Giovanni Ribisi as Mikal, Elias Koteas as Gary, Sam Shepard as the brothers' looming father, and Lee Tergesen as Frank Gilmore Jr. The 1977 punk rock single "Gary Gilmore's Eyes" by the band The Adverts was used in the soundtrack of the movie. The song is written from "the point of view of a hospital patient who has received the eyes of Gary Gilmore in a transplant." In 2003, American alternative rock band ArmsBendBack released a song titled "Gary Gilmore's Eyes" as well.

Welsh playwright Dic Edwards dramatised Gilmore's life in his 1995 play Utah Blue.

Several playwrights have integrated the Gilmore story into their work in one way or another. The Oakland-based performance artist Monte Cazazza sent out photos of himself in an electric chair on the day of the execution. One of these was mistakenly printed in a Hong Kong newspaper as the real execution. Cazazza was also photographed alongside COUM Transmissions/Throbbing Gristle members Genesis P-Orridge and Cosey Fanni Tutti for the "Gary Gilmore Memorial Society" postcard, in which the three artists posed blindfolded and tied to chairs with loaded guns pointed at them to depict Gilmore's execution. In Christopher Durang's play Beyond Therapy (1983), the character Bruce claims that he "wanted to see Gary Gilmore executed on television."

== See also ==
- Capital punishment in the United States
- Capital punishment in Utah
- The Executioner's Song
- John Albert Taylor
- List of people executed in Utah
- List of people executed in the United States, 1976–1983
- Volunteer (capital punishment)

Executions by firing squad in the United States
Preceded by James Woode Rodgers – Utah March 30, 1960	Gary Mark Gilmore – Utah; January 17, 1977	Succeeded by John Albert Taylor – Utah January 26, 1996
Executions carried out in Utah
Preceded by James Woode Rodgers March 30, 1960	Gary Mark Gilmore; January 17, 1977	Succeeded by Dale Selby Pierre August 28, 1987
Executions carried out in the United States
Preceded by Luis Monge – Colorado June 2, 1967	Gary Mark Gilmore – Utah; January 17, 1977	Succeeded by John Arthur Spenkelink – Florida May 25, 1979
