= The Mutants (UK band) =

UK musical group

Background information
- Genres: Punk; new wave; ska
- Years active: 2014–present
- Members: Chris Constantinou; Rat Scabies; Paul "Space" Frazer
- Website: themutants.co

The Mutants is a punk rock supergroup based around Chris Constantinou (The Wolfmen, Sinéad O'Connor, Adam Ant), Rat Scabies (The Damned) and Paul Frazer (Never Not Nothing, Subsource), hosting an all-star cast of guest musicians.

== History ==
In January 2013, Chris Constantinou developed in a discussion with Eugene Butcher, editor from the magazine Vive Le Rock, and Dave Collins the idea of an album set out to retrace the roots of punk, new wave and ska, featuring all-star punk musicians. It materialized in the creation of the musical supergroup The Mutants, with the first album, Rhythm and Punk Review, being released in July 2014. A subsequent album, Tokyo Nights, released in May 2015, had all the songs fronted by a rotating set of Japanese guest stars. The third album, Your Desert My Mind (October 2016), is a collaboration with Californian rock musicians from the desert rock scene. All the albums are released through Killer Tracks. With the third album having again a creative chemistry in a different musical area, The Mutants acquired the image of a band exploring unexpected musical genres, each album having a different musical flavour that reflects the territory, and the style of the musicians that contributed to it.

== Rhythm and Punk Review (2014) ==
The debut album Rhythm and Punk Review was written and produced by Chris Constantinou and Paul Frazer and recorded at Raezor Studion (now Sugar Cane Studios) in London. The songs feature guest musicians from the late 70s punk and ska scene (who also co-wrote the songs). Rat Scabies has played all the drums for the album. Other musicians featured in the album are Norman Watt-Roy (Ian Dury and The Blockheads/Wilko), T. V. Smith (The Adverts), Charlie Harper (UK Subs), Jake Burns (Stiff Little Fingers), Knox (The Vibrators), Neville Staple (The Specials), Judy Nylon (John Cale/Brian Eno), Beki Bondage (Vice Squad), Texas Terri (Texas Terri & The Stiff Ones/Texas Terri Bomb), Preston Heyman (Kate Bush/Tom Robinson Band/Massive Attack), Tim Smart, Jonathan Read (The Specials), and Joe Atkinson (Flipron).

The album reunited after many years Wayne Kramer (MC5) and Wilko Johnson (Dr. Feelgood) (they first collaborated at The London Rock and Roll Show at Wembley in 1972, a meeting that Wilko mentioned it changed his life).

Rhythm and Punk Review received 7/10 ratings from Vive le Rock and from Classic Rock magazines and 8/10 rating from Big Cheese magazine.

== Tokyo Nights (2015) ==
In the album Tokyo Nights Chris Constantinou and Paul Frazer, joined by Rat Scabies and Steve 'West' Weston (Wilko Johnson, Roger Daltrey), have teamed up with musicians from the J-Punk scene, among them Guitar Wolf, The 5.6.7.8's (featured in Kill Bill Volume 1), Mika Bomb, The Neatbeats and Jackie & The Cedrics. The concept of the album developed as the British musicians forming the core of The Mutants supergroup wanted to know more about artists who achieved cult status outside Japan and also discover bands and music that had not ventured further than the Tokyo live house scene. The songs from the album were played live with all the artists in Tokyo.

In reviews, the album was considered a success, noting the chemistry with the guests, the pan-generational mashup, the genres ranging from surf to garage managing to reflect the surreal atmosphere of the underground music in Tokyo, "a rollercoaster ride across a dark J-punk landscape".

The album received 7/10 rating from Classic Rock and 8/10 rating from Vive le Rock magazines. The song "Bamboo Moon" was included in the soundtrack of the TV series Money Heist.

== Your Desert My Mind (2016) ==
The album Your Desert My Mind, released in October 2016, is a collaboration between the three core musicians of The Mutants (Chris Constantinou, Rat Scabies, Paul Frazer) and a series of guests from the Californian rock scene, among them David Catching from Eagles of Death Metal; Chris Goss from Masters of Reality; Brent DeBoer, Peter Holmström, and Zia McCabe from The Dandy Warhols; Sean Wheeler from Throw Rag; and Victoria Williams. The album was recorded at Rancho De La Luna in Joshua Tree, California.

The reviews characterized its style as "desert rock but with a garage punk edge", "another drastically different musical direction" taken by The Mutants, "an eclectic creative power", "the rolling cast of guests all throwing something different in, from the almost spoken word and choral harmonies of 'Night Bus to Krakow' to the driving classic rock feel of Fidgety to the exactly-as-it-sounds 'Machismo Postura'". Being another album unlike anything any of the core members have previously created, it developed the image of The Mutants as a band exploring creatively unexpected musical genres.

Your Desert My Mind received 8/10 ratings from Vive le Rock and Louder Than War magazines.

== Members ==
- Chris Constantinou – bass guitar, flute, vocals
- Rat Scabies – drums
- Paul "Space" Frazer – guitar, keyboards, backing vocals
