= Married to the Eiffel Tower =

Studio album by The Wolfmen
- Released: 2 May 2011
- Recorded: Raezor Studios
- Genre: Post-punk; Alternative rock Rock; Glam rock Pop
- Label: Howl

The Wolfmen chronology
Modernity Killed Every Night (2008)	Married to the Eiffel Tower (2011)

Married to the Eiffel Tower is The Wolfmen's second studio album. It was released digitally on 2 May 2011 and in August 2011 on Compact Disc and vinyl. The title is likely a reference to Erika Eiffel, a woman who famously "married" the Eiffel Tower in 2008.

== Track listing ==
1. "Cat Green Eyes"
2. "Mr Sunday"
3. "Jackie, Is It My Birthday?"
4. "I’m Not A Young Man Anymore"
5. "Marilyn Monroe (Wam Bam JFK)"
6. "July 20"
7. "Damn It Can’t You Just Be Straight"
8. "The Cowboy's Dream"
9. "Coca-Cola Kid"
10. "Blushing God"
