= Erika Eiffel =

American archer (born 1972)

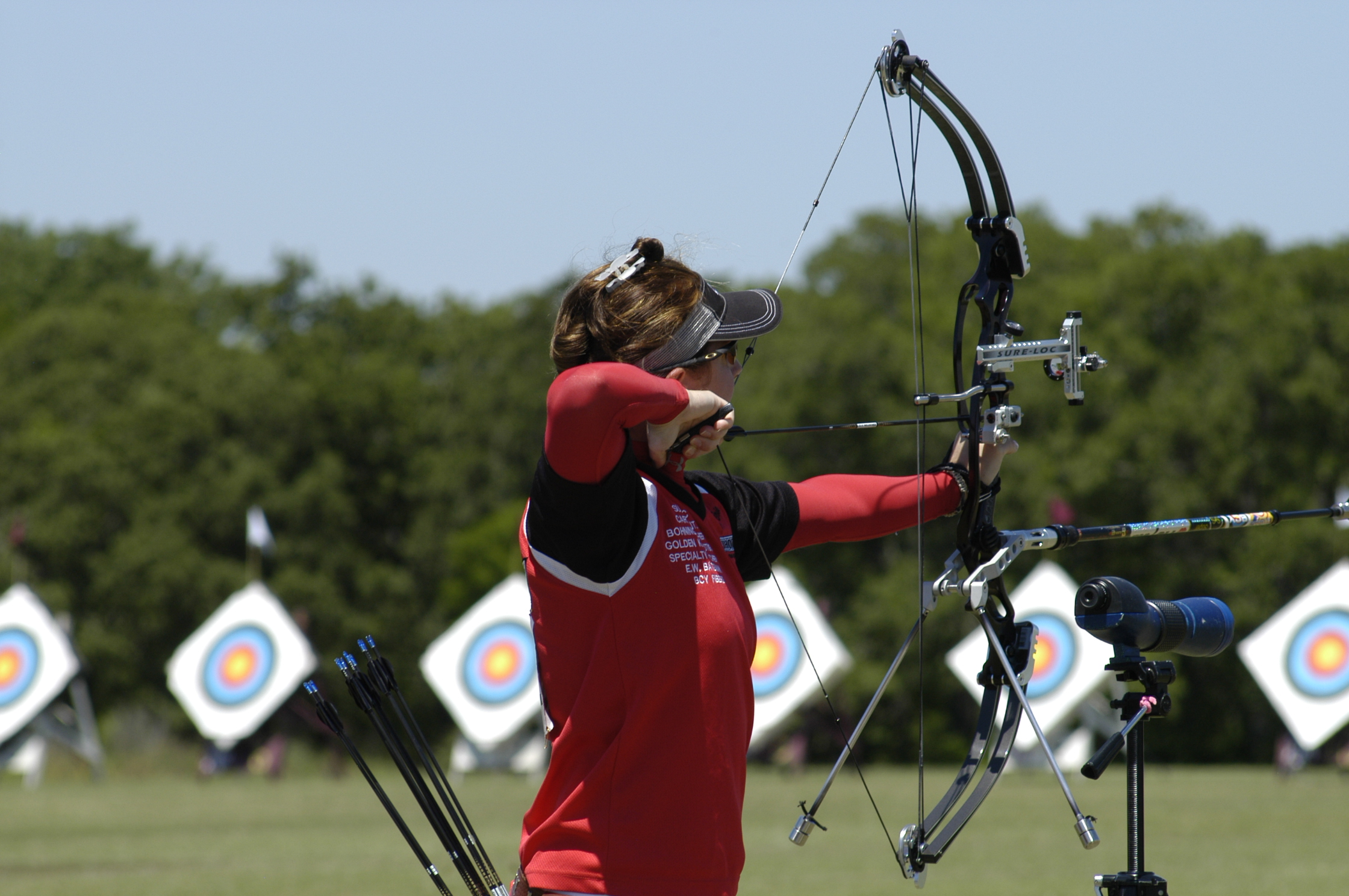
- Eiffel at Texas Shootout Archery
- Born: Erika Labrie; June 19, 1972 (age 54)
- Other name: Erika La Tour Eiffel
- Occupation: Archer
- Known for: Archery, commitment ceremony to the Eiffel Tower, Objectum sexuality

Erika Eiffel (née Labrie; born 1972), also known as Aya, is an American competitive archer and advocate for object sexuality. She married the Eiffel Tower in a commitment ceremony in 2007.

== Military career ==
Eiffel entered the U.S. Air Force Academy in 1993. In her first year, she was sexually assaulted by another cadet, but thwarted the attack with a training sword. She was subsequently dismissed from the Academy with a personality disorder: "I really felt that the only way for me to sleep is if I was holding onto something, like my sword, because that was the one thing that protected me. And it just got worse," she said.

== Archery career ==
Eiffel started recurve archery in 1999 in Japan, and started shooting compound bow a year later. In 2003, she won first place shooting compound bow in both the FITA and Olympic rounds at all three National Cup tournaments: Arizona Cup, Texas Shootout, and Gold Cup. Following her sweep she went on to win gold and break the FITA team record with Team USA at the 42nd World Target Championships in New York City.

Eiffel, known as "Aya" in the archery world, has represented the US at the FITA World Field Championships with Olympic recurve, and also the FITA Target Championships and FITA World Cup with compound bow. She also competed in the IFAA Indoor Championships, where she won gold in 2007 and set the single-round world record in Mannheim, Germany, in Freestyle Limited Recurve.

Eiffel was on the 2004 and 2006 US National Archery Team for compound bow and also the 2009 senior National Team for Olympic recurve.

== Objectum sexuality ==
Eiffel is founder of OS Internationale, an organization for those who develop significant relationships with inanimate objects (object sexuality). She claims that her object relationship with Lance, her competition bow, helped her to become a world-class archer.

She encountered the Eiffel Tower in 2004, and said that she felt an immediate attraction. She told ABC News that she and others "[...] feel an innate connection to objects. It comes perfectly normal to us to connect on various levels, emotional, spiritual and also physical for some." In April 2009, on the second anniversary of her marriage to the Eiffel Tower, she appeared on Good Morning America and explained how her object love empowered her. Her 20-year relationship with the Berlin Wall inspired the musical theater production Erika's Wall.

In 2011, Finnish journalist Janne Flinkkilä moved to Berlin for a year to write a book about Eiffel's object relationships and everyday life. Rautaiset rakastajat – matkani Erika Eiffelin maailmaan ("Iron Lovers – My trip into Erika Eiffel's World") was published in Finland in October 2012.
