= Gaye Advert =

- Birth name: Gaye Black
- Born: 25 August 1956 (age 68); Bideford, Devon, England
- Genres: Punk rock
- Occupation: Musician
- Instrument: Bass guitar
- Years active: 1976–1979
- Labels: Stiff
- Formerly of: The Adverts

Gaye Black (born 25 August 1956), known professionally as Gaye Advert, is an English punk rock musician, best known for being the bassist in The Adverts in the late 1970s. She was one of the first female rock stars of the punk rock movement, whom The Virgin Encyclopedia of 70s Music called the "first female punk star." She was "one of punk's first female icons". Dave Thompson wrote that her "photogenic" looks, "panda-eye make-up and omnipresent leather jacket defined the face of female punkdom until well into the next decade."

== Life and career ==
Gaye Black was born on 25 August 1956, in Bideford, a small coastal town in North Devon. She started playing bass in her room to pass the time, chosen as it was her favourite instrument, and was taught by future bandmate T.V Smith.

Advert had done three years at art college and was reading about punk in the music papers when she decided in 1976 to go and see for herself. After she finished college, qualifying in graphic design, Advert and Smith moved to London due to a lack of jobs and other opportunities in Devon. The two later recruited guitarist Howard Pickup who worked at a rehearsal studio. After trying to find a drummer for a while, they met Laurie Driver, who had never played drums before, but offered to join the band. Advert later married Smith.

After the demise of the Adverts in 1979 due to public media attention, the record deal coming to an end, the death of their manager and turmoil amongst members, Advert stopped playing bass and disappeared from the British punk scene. She has said that she was "a bit disillusioned and worn out," and felt picked on by the press, calling them "pretty sexist - they really sort of pick on you, and go: ‘Ooh, you’re a woman!’. But I just wanted to be a musician. I just wore my normal clothes, my jeans pretty much." She then took up a career as a homecare manager in social services. After 17 years there, many employees including herself were made redundant. She retired and went back to making art. She recounted her experiences of being in the band in an interview for Zillah Minx's 2010 film She's a Punk Rocker UK.

Advert no longer plays bass due to arthritis in her thumbs and does not see a possibility in a reunion. She continues to create art, often in the medium of stained glass, and began to exhibit her work in 2008. She describes her art as "dark, a bit creepy, grotesque in places but with contrasts."
