= T. V. Smith =

English musician (born 1956)

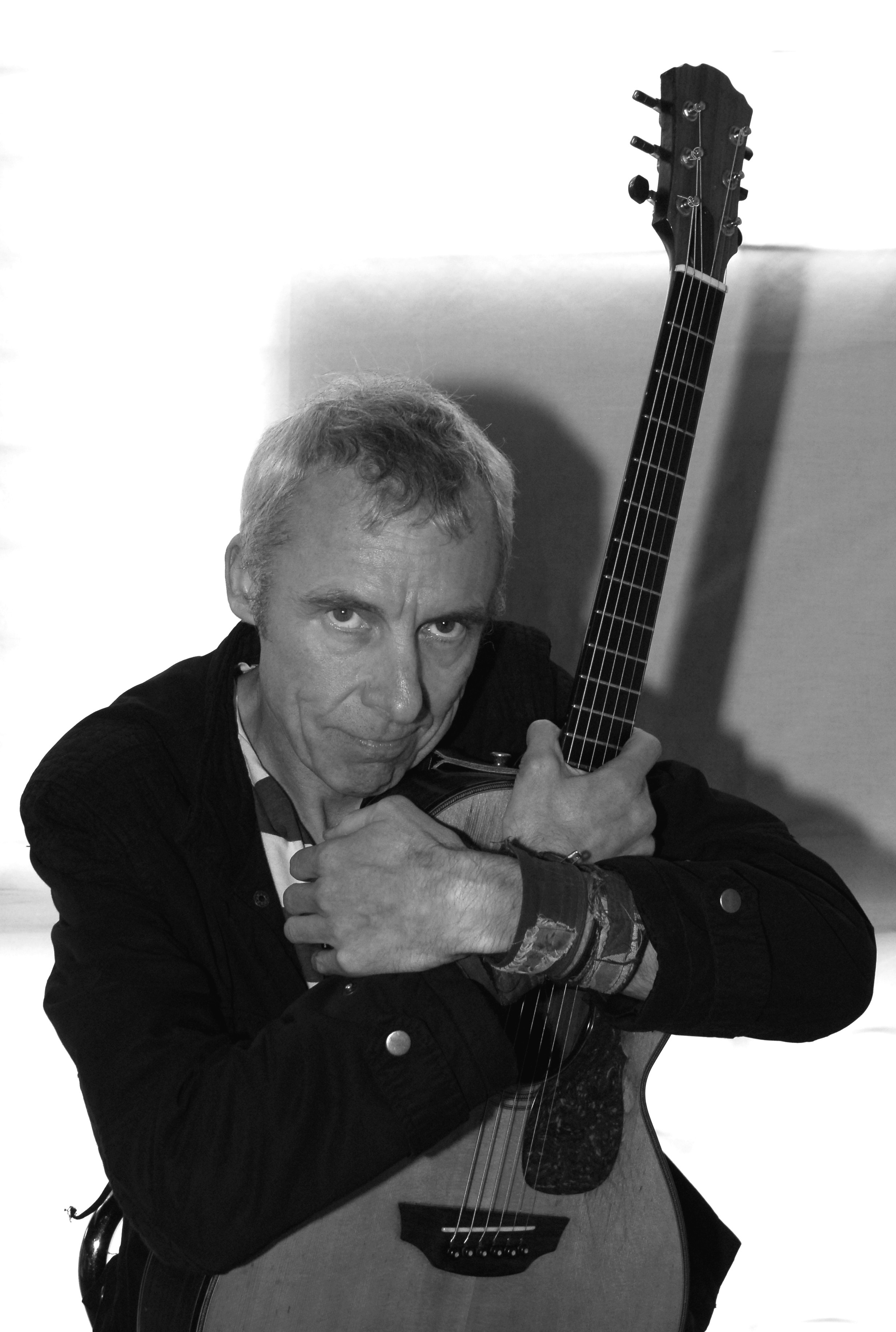

Background information
- Born: 5 April 1956 (age 70); Romford, England
- Occupations: Musician; songwriter
- Instruments: Guitar; vocals
- Years active: 1976–present
- Labels: Cooking Vinyl; Cherry Red; Ozit; Boss Tuneage; Easy Action
- Website: tvsmith.com

Signature
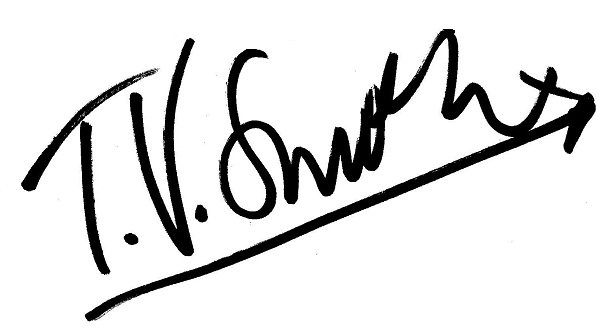

Timothy "T. V." Smith (born 5 April 1956) is an English singer-songwriter who was part of punk band The Adverts in the late 1970s. Since then he has fronted other bands, as well as pursuing a solo career.

== Biography ==
Smith and Gaye Black (a.k.a. Gaye Advert) moved from, respectively, Okehampton in mid-Devon, and Bideford, a small coastal town in Devon, to form The Adverts in London in 1976. The Adverts are best known for their 1977 hit single "Gary Gilmore's Eyes" and acclaimed 1978 debut album Crossing the Red Sea with the Adverts. Following unsuccessful follow-up album Cast of Thousands, The Adverts split up in late 1979, and Smith formed a new band, T.V. Smith's Explorers. They were: Erik Russell (guitar), Colin Stoner (bass), Mel Wesson (keyboards) and David Sinclair (drums). The Explorers released their debut single "Tomahawk Cruise" (a response to the installation of BGM-109 Tomahawk Cruise missiles on UK soil) in 1980, followed by an album, The Last Words of the Great Explorer. Smith then recorded as a solo artist, releasing the album Channel Five in 1983.

Smith's next band was Cheap. Cheap were: TV Smith: Vox, Mik Heslin: Guitar, Martin 'Fuzz' Deniz: Drums, Andy 'Bean' Bennie: Bass. They toured the UK and Europe from 1986 to 1991 and recorded the politically charged single "Third Term", released in 1990. Cheap also recorded a Peel Session for the BBC. However, they failed to find commercial backing for their album RIP...Everything Must Go, which was eventually released in 1993 after the band had split up.

Smith went solo again with album March of the Giants in 1992. Albums Immortal Rich (1995), Generation Y (1999) and Not a Bad Day (2003) followed, with Smith touring constantly, aided overseas by a variety of other bands, including Germany's Die Toten Hosen, Finland's Punk Lurex OK, the United States' Midnight Creeps, and Spain's Suzy & Los Quattro.

In 2005, he joined the American punk band Amen on their UK tour. As well as supporting, he joined them on stage for several covers of Adverts songs, such as "One Chord Wonders", and "Gary Gilmore's Eyes". Casey Chaos, lead singer, is a lifelong fan of The Adverts, and referenced them in the song "Hello (One Chord Lovers)".

In 2006 Smith contributed vocals to the song "Ein Jahr (Es geht voran)" on Fehlfarben's album 26 1/2. The same year saw his first album (Misinformation Overload) on Boss Tuneage records. In the Arms of My Enemy followed in 2008. In 2010 a series of re-issue CDs began with 'Sparkle in the Mud', a compilation of previously unreleased material from the early-1980s period.

In 2012, Smith was the subject of a BBC Four documentary on his career as a singer-songwriter, credited with renewing public interest in his work.

== Discography ==
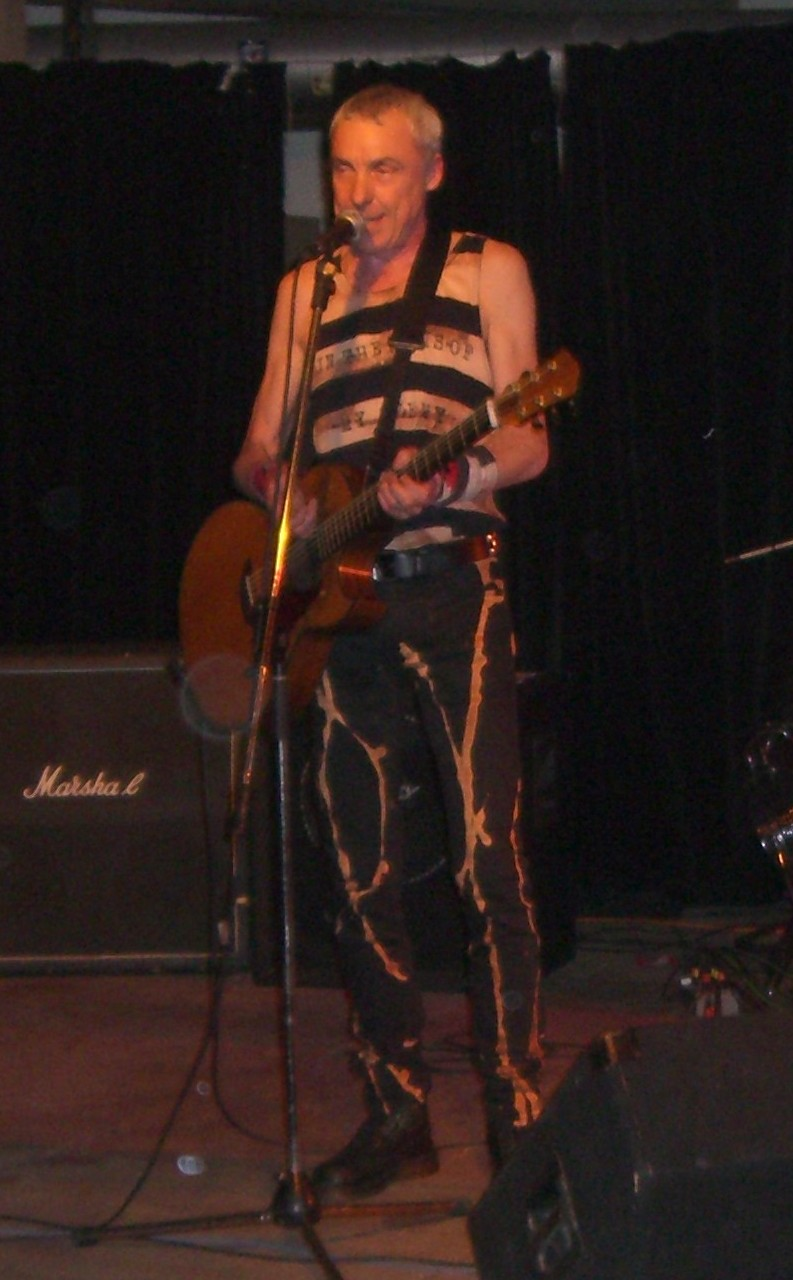
Smith performing in 2008

=== with The Adverts ===
- Crossing the Red Sea with the Adverts (1978, Bright Records)
- Cast of Thousands (1979, RCA Records)

=== with T.V. Smith's Explorers ===
==== Albums ====
- The Last Words of the Great Explorer (1981), Kaleidoscope Sound/Epic [rereleased on CD (1998) and as 2CD (2012)]

==== Singles ====
- "Tomahawk Cruise" (1980), Big Beat
- "The Servant" (1981), Kaleidoscope Sound
- "Have Fun" (1981), Kaleidoscope Sound
- "The Perfect Life" (1981), Kaleidoscope Sound

=== Solo ===
==== Albums ====
- Channel Five (1983), Expulsion
- March of the Giants (1992), Cooking Vinyl [rereleased 2012]
- Immortal Rich (1995), Humbug
- Generation Y (1999), Cherry Red
- Not a Bad Day (2003), TVS
- Misinformation Overload (2006), Boss Tuneage
- In the Arms of My Enemy (2008), Boss Tuneage
- Coming in to Land (2011), Boss Tuneage
- I Delete (2014), TVS
- Land of the Overdose (2018)
- Lockdown Holiday (2020)

===== Compilations and Live =====
- Useless – the Very Best of T.V. Smith (2001), JKP [1 new song plus re-recordings with Die Toten Hosen as backing band]
- T.V. Smith & The Bored Teenagers Perform Crossing The Red Sea with the Adverts Live at the 100 Club London (2007), Boss Tuneage
- Live at the N. V. A. Ludwigsfelde, Germany (2009), Boss Tuneage
- Sparkle in the Mud (2010, recorded 1979–1983), Boss Tuneage
- Lucky Us (2012, recorded 1983–1986), Boss Tuneage
- Acoustic Sessions Volume 1 (2013), TVS [new recordings]

==== Singles ====
- "War Fever" (1983), Expulsion
- "Coming Round" (1985), Production House [as 'Production House']
- "We Want the Road" (1994), Humbug
- "Thin Green Line" (1996), Humbug – (with Tom Robinson)
- "The Future Used To Be Better" (2000), Hiljaiset Levyt – (with Punk Lurex OK)
- "What If?" (2003), No Tomorrow – (with Suzy & Los Quattro)
- "Punk Aid" (2003) – (with various punk luminaries led by Captain Sensible)
- "Xmas Bloody Xmas" (2004), Damaged Goods – (with Vom Ritchie – drummer from Die Toten Hosen, and Tim Cross)
- "Dangerous Playground E.P." (2014) (all tracks included on later I Delete album release.)

=== with T.V. Smith's Cheap ===
==== Albums ====
- Everything Must Go! (1993), Humbug [rereleased as Anthology (2012)]

==== Singles ====
- "Third Term" (1990), Deltic [as 'Cheap']

with Richard Strange

Albums

- "1978" (2021), Molecular Stream Records)
- "A Dffrnt Wrld" (2023), Bandcamp)

== Bibliography ==
- T. V. Smith: Getting There – Punk Rock Tour Diaries: Volume One. Arima, Suffolk 2006, ISBN 978-1-84549-128-4
- Dave Thompson: TV Smith – Your Ticket Out of Here – The Complete Collector's Guide Createspace, 2009
- T. V. Smith: How to Feel Human – Punk Rock Tour Diaries: Volume Two. Arima, Suffolk 2009, ISBN 978-1-84549-360-8
- T. V. Smith: Tales of the Emergency Sandwich – Punk Rock Tour Diaries: Volume Three. Arima, Suffolk 2012, ISBN 978-1-84549-552-7
- T. V. Smith: To Heligoland and Beyond! – Punk Rock Tour Diaries: Volume Four. Arima, Suffolk 2013, ISBN 978-1-84549-600-5
- T. V. Smith: Book of the Year – Punk Rock Tour Diaries: Volume Five. Arima, Suffolk 2014, ISBN 978-1-84549-633-3
