= The Adverts =

English punk rock band

Background information
- Origin: London, England and Devon, England
- Genres: Punk rock
- Years active: 1976–1979
- Labels: Stiff; Anchor; Bright; RCA
- Past members: Tim Smith (T. V. Smith); Gaye Black (Gaye Advert); Howard Boak (Howard Pickup); Laurie Muscat (Laurie Driver); John Towe; Rod Latter; Tim Cross; Paul Martinez; Rick Martinez

The Adverts were an English punk rock band formed in 1976 that existed until late 1979. They were one of the first punk bands to achieve mainstream success in the UK; their 1977 single "Gary Gilmore's Eyes" reached No. 18 on the UK singles chart. The Virgin Encyclopedia of 70s Music described bassist and founding member Gaye Advert as the "first female punk star".

== History ==
The band was formed in 1976 by T. V. Smith (Tim Smith) and Gaye Advert (Gaye Black). Smith was from the town of Okehampton in mid-Devon, and Advert was from Bideford, a small coastal town in North Devon. After relocating to London, the two young punks recruited guitarist Howard Pickup (Boak) and drummer Laurie Driver (Muscat), and the Adverts were born.

The Roxy, London's first live punk venue, played a crucial role in the Adverts' early career. They were one of the pioneering bands who played at the club during its first 100 days. The Adverts played at the club no fewer than nine times between January and April 1977. In January 1977, after their first gig supporting Generation X, the band impressed Michael Dempsey so much that he became their manager. Their second gig supporting Slaughter & the Dogs was recorded, and their anthem "Bored Teenagers" was included on the 1977 UK Top 30 album The Roxy London WC2. In February, shortly after the band's third gig supporting the Damned, they signed a recording contract with Stiff Records. In March, the band supported the Jam at the Roxy.

In April, the Adverts recorded the first of four sessions for John Peel at BBC Radio 1. Days later, on 29 April 1977, their debut single "One Chord Wonders" was released by Stiff. The single, "a headlong rush of energy", was recommended by both Melody Maker and Sounds. Understanding the band's limitations, the song's lyrics, composed by TV Smith, were likeably self-deprecating:

I wonder what we’ll play for you tonight
Something heavy or something light
Something to set your soul alight
I wonder how we’ll answer when you say
'We don’t like you – go away
Come back when you’ve learnt to play

The Adverts were a prolific live act. Their first nationwide tour was with Stiff labelmates the Damned. The tour poster read: "The Damned can now play three chords, The Adverts can play one. Hear all four of them at..." Later they would support Iggy Pop on tour, as well as conducting their own headlining tours in Britain, Ireland and continental Europe.

Original UK 45 rpm single picture cover: The Adverts "Gary Gilmore's Eyes" (original Anchor release)

On 19 August 1977, the band released the first of their two UK Top 40 hit singles on Anchor Records. Lyrically, "Gary Gilmore's Eyes" was a controversial song based on the wishes of Gary Gilmore, an American murderer, that his eyes be donated to medical science after his execution. Sounds described it as "the sickest and cleverest record to come out of the new wave". It was later included in Mojo magazine's list of the best punk rock singles of all time.

After the tabloid-fueled controversy surrounding the single, and an appearance on Top of the Pops, the Adverts became big news. Observers focused on frontman Smith and bassist Gaye Advert. Reviewers noted Smith's songwriting ability. He was said to have "captured the spirit of the times few contemporaries could match". Another reviewer described Smith as the band's "raging heart, spitting out the failsafe succession of songs which still delineate punk’s hopes, aspirations and, ultimately, regrets". In contrast, Gaye Advert's reputation was more fleeting. She was "one of punk’s first female icons". Her "photogenic" looks, "panda-eye make-up and omnipresent leather jacket defined the face of female punkdom until well into the next decade".

The band's follow-up single, "Safety in Numbers", was released on 28 October but did not chart. A fourth single, "No Time to Be 21", issued on CBS subsidiary Bright Records on 20 January 1978, scraped into the UK Top 40.

The band's debut album, Crossing the Red Sea was released by Bright on 17 February 1978. It has since become one of the most highly regarded albums of the punk era, with Dave Thompson calling it "a devastating debut, one of the finest albums not only of the punk era, but of the 1970s as a whole", Trouser Press calling it "the equal of the first Sex Pistols or Clash LP, a hasty statement that captures an exciting time", and several other writers including it in lists of all-time greatest albums.

Switching to RCA Records, the Adverts released three additional well-regarded singles, "Television's Over" on 10 November 1978, "My Place" on 1 June 1979 and "Cast of Thousands" on 19 October 1979, but were unable to maintain their momentum. Their career stalled after the release of their second album Cast of Thousands, issued by RCA on 12 October 1979. For that album, the lineup was augmented by drummer Rod Latter (replacing Driver) and keyboardist Tim Cross. Pickup and Latter were then replaced by Paul Martinez (guitar) and Rick Martinez (drums).

Shortly after the album's release, the band were threatened with lawsuits by former members Pickup and Latter, who objected to the band continuing to use the Adverts name without them. They split up shortly after the accidental death by electrocution of manager Dempsey. Their last gig was at Slough College on 27 October 1979. After the band ended, T.V. Smith continued with Cross as T.V. Smith's Explorers, then Cheap, and finally as a solo artist from the 1990s onward.

In regards to their legacy, critic and author Dave Thompson argued that "nobody would make music like the Adverts and nobody ever has. In terms of lyric, delivery, commitment and courage, they were, and they remain, the finest British group of the late 1970s".

Former members who have died include Cross (died 9 July 2012) and Pickup (died 11 July 1997).

== Discography ==
=== Studio albums ===
- Crossing the Red Sea with the Adverts (1978, Bright Records) UK No. 38
- Cast of Thousands (1979, RCA Records)

=== Singles ===
- "One Chord Wonders" / "Quickstep" (1977, Stiff Records)
- "Gary Gilmore's Eyes" / "Bored Teenagers" (1977, Anchor Records) UK No. 18 UK Indie No. 5
- "Safety in Numbers" / "We Who Wait" (1977, Anchor Records) UK No. 52 (Note: Chart position is from the official UK "Breakers List".)
- "No Time to Be 21" / "New Day Dawning" (1978, Bright Records) UK No. 34
- "Television's Over" / "Back from the Dead" (1978, RCA Records)
- "My Place" / "New Church" (1979, RCA Records)
- "Cast of Thousands" / "I Will Walk You Home" (1979, RCA Records)

=== EPs ===
- The Peel Sessions (1987, Strange Fruit Records) UK Indie No. 18

=== Live albums ===
- Live at the Roxy Club (1990, Receiver Records)
- Live and Loud !! (1992, Link Records)

=== Compilation albums ===
- The Wonders Don’t Care: The Complete Radio Recordings (1997, Burning Airlines)
- The Punk Singles Collection (1997, Anagram Records)
- The Best of The Adverts (1998, Anagram Records)
- Anthology (2003, The Devils Own Jukebox)

=== Selected compilation appearances ===
- "Gary Gilmore's Eyes" on

- 20 of Another Kind (1979, Polydor Records) UK No. 45
- Burning Ambitions: A History of Punk (1984, Cherry Red Records)
- Indestructible the Indomitable Face of New Wave (1987, Receiver Records)
- The Best of 20 of Another Kind (1989, Castle Music)
- DIY: Punk, Power Pop, and New Wave 1976-1983 (1992, Rhino Records)
- Lipstick Traces (1993, Rough Trade Records)
- No Thanks! The '70s Punk Rebellion box set (2003, Rhino Records)
- New Wave Heroes (2006, Sony BMG Music Entertainment)
- 1977 – The Spirit of Punk (2007, Virgin Records)
- The Edge of the Seventies (2008, Sony BMG Music Entertainment)

- "One Chord Wonders" on

- Indestructible the Indomitable Face of New Wave (1987, Receiver Records)
- Lipstick Traces (1993, Rough Trade Records)
- No Thanks! The '70s Punk Rebellion box set (2003, Rhino Records)
- The Stiff Records Box Set box set (1992, Demon Records)
- 1-2-3-4 Punk & New Wave 1976-1979 box set (1999, Universal Records)
- Cash from Chaos box set (2001, EMI Records)
- The Great British Punk Rock Explosion (1991, Link Records)

- "Bored Teenagers" on

- The Roxy London WC2 (1977, Harvest Records) UK No. 24
- The Roxy London WC2 – A Live Punk Box Set box set (2005, Castle Music)
- If the Kids Are United: The Punk Box Set box set (2008, Castle Music)

- "No Time to be 21" on The Great British Punk Rock Explosion (1991, Link Records)

== See also ==
- List of 1970s punk rock musicians
- List of Peel Sessions
- List of performers on Top of the Pops
- List of punk bands from the United Kingdom
- Music of the United Kingdom (1970s)

== Sources ==
- Dimery, Robert (2005). 1001 Albums You Must Hear Before You Die. London: Cassell. p. 404. "Smith did not deal in simple sensationalism, and his songs suggest a rebel with a cause: 'No Time to Be 21', 'One Chord Wonders', and 'Bored Teenagers' all served as anthems for the blank generation."
- Ellingham, Mark; Buckley, Jonathan (1996). Rock: The Rough Guide. London: Rough Guides. ISBN 1-85828-201-2.
- Larkin, Colin (1994). All Time Top 1000 Albums. Enfield: Guinness Publishing. ISBN 0-85112-786-X.
- Larkin, Colin (2002). The Virgin Encyclopedia of 70s Music. London: Virgin Books. ISBN 1-85227-947-8.
- Joynson, Vernon (2001). Up Yours! A Guide to UK Punk, New Wave & Early Post Punk. Wolverhampton: Borderline Publications. ISBN 1-899855-13-0.
- Roberts, David (1996). British Hit Albums (7th ed.). Enfield, Middlesex: Guinness Publishing Ltd. ISBN 0-85112-619-7.
- Roberts, David (2006). British Hit Singles & Albums (19th ed.). London: Guinness World Records Limited. ISBN 1-904994-10-5.
- Strong, M.C. (2003). The Great Indie Discography. Edinburgh: Canongate. ISBN 1-84195-335-0.
- Thompson, Dave (2000). Alternative Rock. San Francisco: Miller Freeman Books. ISBN 0-87930-607-6.
- Thompson, Dave (2000). Punk. Ontario: Collector’s Guide Publication. ISBN 1-896522-27-0.
