= Vive Le Rock (magazine) =

British music magazine

- Editor: Eugene Butcher
- Categories: Music
- Frequency: Ten times annually
- Circulation: 15,000
- Publisher: Big Cheese Publishing Ltd.
- Founded: 2010
- Country: United Kingdom
- Language: English
- Website: www.vivelerock.net//index.php
- ISSN: 1365-358X

Vive Le Rock is an independent music magazine published in the United Kingdom which covers punk, new wave, glam, and garage through to mod and primal rock 'n' roll, and the darker side of alternative rock. It is circulated 10 times annually, an increase on previous bi-monthly circulation.

The magazine has won praise from respected music website Louder Than War, whose editor John Robb in 2012 declared Vive Le Rock the "best punk rock magazine on the planet." The Guardian, in an overview of the 2010s UK music press, described the magazine as adopting a "more left field" position than such magazines as Classic Pop and Vintage Rock and summarized Vive Le Rock's commercial strategy as "cater(ing) for people whose sine qua non is punk rock."

Publisher Eugene Butcher was appointed by the BBC as one of their Pundits for the Sound of 2012. He also sings for the U.K.-based band Desperate Measures.

== Features ==
=== Scope ===
Vive Le Rock dedicates itself to "rebel music" and gives coverage both to established acts such as the Ramones, Blondie, The Cure, Motörhead, The Stray Cats, Devo, and The Clash and also newer bands such as The Gaslight Anthem, Bronx, White Lies, and Rancid. The magazine's remit is to bring to its readers "the bad boys" (and girls) of rock 'n' roll, and to embody the culture about which it writes about rather than just aspire thus.

=== Content ===
Monthly editions consist of sections including news – and introduction pages, album, book, DVD as well as live reviews and gig listings. Cover features are typically in-depth portraits, running to up to ten pages, of rock 'n' roll's most notorious rebel performers. A themed fifteen-track CD is included with each issue likewise containing material by veterans and promising newcomers.

The magazine embodies the punk ethos by adopting the writing style of 1970s/1980s punk fanzines, engaging its readers on the subjects closest to their hearts. Artists featured include the Ramones, Madness, the Who, Faces, Black Flag, Echo & the Bunnymen, New Order, Johnny Cash, Tom Waits, Jerry Lee Lewis, The Jim Jones Revue, The Vivian Girls, and Wavves. Longtime contributing writer Jyrki "Spider" Hämäläinen wrote the first ever Killing Joke biography 'Killing Joke: Are You Receiving?', which was published in November 2020. In 2019 it launched the hugely successful Vive Le Rock Awards. It also publishes bigger, Annual type Specials on subjects such as Post Punk and Goth music. Big Cheese Publishing also produces Fistful Of Metal and Down For Life magazines.

== Sales ==
By 2014, Vive Le Rock was increasing its sales at a time when most other music magazines were experiencing a decline.

== Personnel ==
Staff

- Eugene Butcher – Editor In Chief
- Jim Sharples – Deputy Editor
- Bruce Turnbull – Reviews Editor
- Design – Ed Le Froy and Steve Kitchen.
