= The Wolfmen =

English rock band

- Origin: London, England
- Genres: Post-punk, alternative rock
- Years active: 2004–present
- Labels: Damaged Goods, Howl
- Members: Marco Pirroni; Chris Constantinou; Phil Harvey; Zelig Preston Heyman; Daniel Strittmatter
- Website: thewolfmen.net

The Wolfmen are an English rock music band formed in 2004, and centred on Marco Pirroni (guitars, co-writer) and Chris Constantinou (bass guitar, lead vocals, co-writer).

== Background ==
Constantinou began as a bass guitar player with Diz Watson until the late 1970s when he formed Drill, who worked extensively with Chas Chandler and then Adam Ant, who he joined in 1982.

By that stage, Pirroni, who has worked with Siouxsie and the Banshees, the Models and Rema-Rema - had joined Adam and the Ants to worldwide acclaim, co-writing two number one singles and a further four top tens with Ant for the band. When the Ants disbanded in 1982, Pirroni remained as Ant's co-writer, starting off with the duo's third number one single ("Goody Two Shoes") and a top 5 hit album (Friend or Foe), followed by four more top 20 hits. The former gave Pirroni and Ant their second shared Ivor Novello award.

Constantinou and Pirroni went their separate ways in the mid-1980s, with Constantinou forming the Miles Copeland-managed SF Go with Danny Kustow (TRB, Glen Matlock), followed by a co-writing project with Bow Wow Wow's Annabella Lwin, which led to the hit single "Do What You Do" (Sony, 1994), complete with Farley & Heller and Junior Vasquez mixes. This led to a song writing partnership with multi-Ivor Novello winner Guy Chambers, before Constantinou took centre stage with post-punk outfit Jackie On Assid, releasing two albums (2001's 4Play and 2002's Zip Me Up), touring extensively, soundtracking award-winning British filmmaker Paul Hills' 2003 movie The Poet and supporting Iggy Pop.

By the time they came back together to form the Wolfmen, Pirroni had added co-writing and performing credits with Sinéad O'Connor to his CV, as well as releasing the acclaimed SEX: Too Fast To Live Too Young To Die and Biba: Champagne and Novocaine albums on his own label, Only Lovers Left Alive.

== History ==
August 2006 saw their first EP released – a limited edition 10-inch vinyl and download on Damaged Goods. Its four tracks include a cover of Brian Eno's "Needle In A Camel's Eye". Lead track "Jackie Says" had a film noir video by Paul Hills that was premiered on Slash Music, Channel 4's music website. They received strong media support for "Jackie Says", including Jonathan Ross (BBC Radio 2), Mark Lamarr (BBC Radio 2), Phill Jupitus (BBC 6Music), Gary Crowley (BBC), Steve Jones (Jonesy's Jukebox) and the BBC's music website which asked "Is (Marco and Chris') music as necessary in 2006 as it was nearly 30 years ago? In a word, yes. In more words, too fucking right it is."

A second limited edition single appeared in October 2006 on 7-inch vinyl and download. "Kama Sutra"/"TV's On John Wayne's Been Shot Again" became iTunes' Rock Pick of the Day and won rave reviews including Metro and Mojo which said: "...Marco and Chris do growing old disgracefully moves with style. With thumping Suicide-alike beatbox and glam-rockabilly guitars, the A-side is exuberant filth…" As part of the promo for the single, the band visited the United States, where they appeared on Jonesy's Jukebox, hosted by ex-Sex Pistol Steve Jones and the CMJ Music Marathon where Pirroni was a guest speaker. An extensive interview with Pirroni on his life, times and the Wolfmen appeared on SuicideGirls in January 2007. US radio picked up on the band with 'taste-maker' stations including KROQ Los Angeles, KDLD Los Angeles and KVGS Las Vegas playing tracks. As a result, "Jackie Says" entered the FMQB's MediaGuide airplay chart which monitors specialist, college and tastemaker airplay, beating new releases from Babyshambles and The Good, the Bad & the Queen to make one of the highest ever entries in the chart, remaining in the top five for three weeks and the top 10 for five weeks.

A third single, "Cecilie" was released on 12 November 2007 on CD single, limited 7-inch vinyl and download. The B-side is "Do the Ostrich", co-written by Constantinou and Pirroni with Lou Reed. The CD included the bonus track, "Look Like Tarzan Sing Like Jane".

Their fifth single "Needle in the Camel's Eye", was released on 5 May 2008 on 3-track extra-hard 7-inch vinyl and as a digital download on Damaged Goods records. Immediately selling out its vinyl run, the single generated a double-page spread in Word magazine and reached number one in Mojo's Playlist chart. "This is one band whose energy and vigour craps out of my speakers. 9/10," reported Atomic Duster.com. "Marco Pirroni and fellow ex-Ant Chris Constantinou do a fine mix of ESG beats and old school glam that holds a knife to the throat of pretenders," said Teletext. The single was launched with a live date at Smoky Carrot Sessions at 333 Motherclub, Shoreditch, on 17 April.

They released their first full-length album, Modernity Killed Every Night, 1 September 2008 on the Damaged Goods label. It includes most of their previously released singles.

"Better Days" from the debut album was featured in the 2011 version of 2K's MLB2K11 baseball video game for Xbox 360 and PlayStation 3 and was also featured in the Wii and 3DS versions of Need for Speed: The Run.

== Collaborations ==
Pirroni and Constantinou finished co-writing with Lou Reed in June 2006. A twisted remake of the Primitives' 1964 cult classic "The Ostrich".

The Slits' comeback record, The Revenge of the Killer Slits appeared in September 2006 which featured both Pirroni and Constantinou.

In spring 2007, the Wolfmen first collaborated with Daler Mehndi and Pirroni provided guitar for Primal Scream's cover of Screamin' Jay Hawkins' "I Put A Spell On You", a special commission for an Alexander McQueen fashion show.

In October 2009, the Wolfmen released "Jackie, Is It My Birthday?", a duet between Sinéad O'Connor and Chris Constantinou. It is the first release from the band's prolific 2009 sessions with the Dandy Warhols' Courtney Taylor-Taylor in the producer's chair. As Taylor-Taylor says of his new charges, "These guys are fucking brilliant... I guess The Wolfmen just sound like heavy weights because they are."

The Wolfmen wrote and recorded track with Kate Jackson, from the now defunct band The Long Blondes, called Weightless. They have also worked on some other tracks for her forthcoming debut album.

== Discography ==
- Modernity Killed Every Night (Damaged Goods) (2008)
- Married to the Eiffel Tower (Howl Records) (2011)
