= The OMD Singles =

Extended play by Orchestral Manoeuvres in the Dark

Compilation album by Orchestral Manoeuvres in the Dark
- Released: 28 September 1998
- Genre: Synth-pop
- Length: 70:37
- Label: Virgin – V 2859
- Producer: Various

Orchestral Manoeuvres in the Dark chronology
Universal (1996)	The OMD Singles (1998)	Peel Sessions 1979–1983 (2000)

Alternative cover
- 2003 remix edition

The OMD Singles is a singles compilation album by Orchestral Manoeuvres in the Dark (OMD), released in 1998. It reached number 16 on the UK Albums Chart. Originally, the compilation was to include a second disc of new remixes; however, this idea was abandoned due to budget limitations. The few remixes that were produced were released separately as The OMD Remixes. In 2003, The OMD Singles was reissued in France with the remix disc finally included, comprising the 1998 remixes as well as additional remixes. In the same year Virgin also released a two-disc box set comprising The OMD Singles and Navigation: The OMD B-Sides.

== Reception ==
Professional ratings
Review scores
Source	Rating
AllMusic	4.5/5 stars
Press & Sun-Bulletin	A−
The Rolling Stone Album Guide	3.5/5 stars
Spin	9/10

Tom Schulte of AllMusic wrote, "Originating in post-punk synth experimentation and closing in dated, but still strong, pop productions, The OMD Singles is an excellent time line of the band whose sound covered in a single career that same territory explored by the Human League, Erasure, [Yazoo], New Order, and beyond." In the Press & Sun-Bulletin, Andy Stevens said, "What is most stunning about this compilation is that is displays the incredible emotional, rhythmic and stylistic range that Orchestral Manoeuvres in the Dark drew out of electronics... this collection is near brilliant." Paul Evans of Rolling Stone referred to the album as "radio music made in heaven".

== Track listing ==
=== Single disc issue ===
- CD: Virgin / CDV 2859 (UK)
- MiniDisc: Virgin / MDV2859 (UK)
- Compact Cassette: Virgin / TCV2859 (UK)
1. "Electricity" – 3:32 from Orchestral Manoeuvres in the Dark
2. "Messages" – 4:46 from Orchestral Manoeuvres in the Dark
3. "Enola Gay" – 3:32 from Organisation
4. "Souvenir" – 3:37 from Architecture & Morality
5. "Joan of Arc" – 3:47 from Architecture & Morality
6. "Maid of Orleans" – 4:12 from Architecture & Morality
7. "Tesla Girls" – 3:34 from Junk Culture
8. "Locomotion" – 3:57 from Junk Culture
9. "Talking Loud and Clear" – 3:56 from Junk Culture
10. "So in Love" – 3:30 from Crush
11. "If You Leave" – 4:30 from Pretty in Pink
12. "(Forever) Live and Die" – 3:36 from The Pacific Age
13. "Dreaming" – 3:58 from The Best of OMD
14. "Sailing on the Seven Seas" – 3:45 from Sugar Tax
15. "Pandora's Box" – 4:06 from Sugar Tax
16. "Call My Name" – 4:15 from Sugar Tax
17. "Dream of Me" – 3:53 from Liberator
18. "Walking on the Milky Way" – 4:02 from Universal

Another version of 18 songs has 'Call My Name' (track 16) omitted and 'Enola Gay - OMD vs Sash!' included (track 18)

=== French issue with remix disc ===
- CD: Virgin / 724358285925 (France, 2003)

==== Disc one ====
1. "Electricity" – 3:32
2. "Messages" – 4:46
3. "Enola Gay" – 3:32
4. "Souvenir" – 3:37
5. "Joan of Arc" – 3:47
6. "Maid of Orleans" – 4:12
7. "Tesla Girls" – 3:34
8. "Locomotion" – 3:57
9. "Talking Loud and Clear" – 3:56
10. "So in Love" – 3:30
11. "If You Leave" – 4:30
12. "(Forever) Live and Die" – 3:36
13. "Dreaming" – 3:58
14. "Sailing on the Seven Seas" – 3:45
15. "Pandora's Box" – 4:06
16. "Call My Name" – 4:15
17. "Dream of Me" – 3:53
18. "Walking on the Milky Way" – 4:02

==== Disc two ====
1. "Enola Gay" (remix by David Guetta & Joachim Garraud) – 3:05
2. "Enola Gay" (OMD vs. Sash!) – 5:03
3. "Souvenir" (7am version) – 6:47
4. "Souvenir" (Me & Us remix) – 11:32
5. "Souvenir" (Hard House version) – 5:47
6. "Souvenir" (Moby remix) – 4:41
7. "Electricity" (The Micronauts remix) – 8:45
8. "Apollo XI" (@440 Northern Electronic Soul remix) – 6:15
9. "Joan of Arc" (Organ mix by Mulu) – 6:12
10. "Maid of Orleans" (Afterhours mix by Mulu) – 6:12
11. "Enola Gay" (Dancefloor Killa remix by David Guetta & Joachim Garraud) – 9:02
- Track 2 is the full unedited version of the Sash! remix, excluding the vocal samples.
- Tracks 9 and 10 were reversed on the album packaging, correct positions are listed here.

== The OMD Remixes ==
The OMD Remixes

EP by Orchestral Manoeuvres in the Dark
- Released: 14 September 1998
- Genre: Dance
- Label: Virgin
- Producer: Various

Orchestral Manoeuvres in the Dark chronology
The OMD Remixes (1998)	History of Modern (Part I) (2011)

The OMD Remixes were released two weeks before The OMD Singles compilation album. The highest UK singles chart position was number 35.

=== Reception ===
Professional ratings
Review scores
Source	Rating
AllMusic	2.5/5 stars

David Jeffries of AllMusic wrote, "Sash! turns 'Enola Gay' into a pumping trance anthem, but the inserted news broadcasts are misguided, and hardly what you'd call respectful. Moby lightly updates 'Souvenir', but the Micronauts end up the winner doing a fine job of turning 'Electricity' into a noisy stomper."

=== Track listing ===
==== CD: Virgin / VSCDT 1694 (UK) ====
1. "Enola Gay" (OMD vs. Sash! radio edit) – 4:04
2. "Souvenir" (Moby remix) – 4:41
3. "Electricity" (The Micronauts remix) – 8:44

==== 12": Virgin / VST 1694 (UK) ====
Side one

1. "Enola Gay" (OMD vs. Sash!) – 5:18
2. "Souvenir" (7am version) – 6:47

Side two

1. "Souvenir" (Hard House version) – 5:47

==== 12": Virgin / VSTX 1694 (UK) ====
Side one

1. "Electricity" (The Micronauts remix) – 8:45

Side two

1. "Apollo XI" (@440 Northern Electronic Soul remix) – 6:15
2. "Enola Gay" (OMD vs Sash! Radio Edit) – 4:04

==== Promo CD: Virgin / VSCDJ1694 (UK) ====
1. "Enola Gay" (OMD vs Sash!) – 4:08
2. "Souvenir" (Moby Remix) – 4:40
3. "Electricity" (The Micronauts Remix Edit) – 4:03

==== Promo double 12": Virgin / VSTDJ 1694 (UK) ====
Side one

1. "Enola Gay" (OMD Vs Sash!) – 6:11
2. "Souvenir" (7AM Version) – 6:47

Side two

1. "Souvenir" (Me & Us Mix) – 11:34
2. "Souvenir" (Hard House Version) – 5:47

Side three

1. "Electricity" (The Micronauts Remix) – 8:44

Side four

1. "Apollo XI" (@440 Northern Electronic Soul Remix) – 6:15
- The "Enola Gay" mix sampled news broadcasts announcing the atomic bombing of Hiroshima, as well as the J. Robert Oppenheimer quote, "Now I am become death, destroyer of worlds."
- The "Electricity" mix sampled the song "Bunker Soldiers" from OMD's self-titled debut album.
