= She's Leaving =

Single by Orchestral Manoeuvres in the Dark

from the album Architecture & Morality
- B-side: "The Romance of the Telescope"
- Released: 17 June 1982 (Benelux only)
- Studio: The Manor, Shipton-on-Cherwell, Oxfordshire, England
- Genre: Synth-pop
- Length: 3:22
- Label: Virgin
- Songwriters: Andy McCluskey; Paul Humphreys
- Producers: OMD; Richard Manwaring

Orchestral Manoeuvres in the Dark singles chronology
"Maid of Orleans (The Waltz Joan of Arc)" (1982)	"She's Leaving" (1982)	"Genetic Engineering" (1983)

Music video
- "She's Leaving" on YouTube

"She's Leaving" is a song by the English electronic band Orchestral Manoeuvres in the Dark (OMD), released in June 1982 as the fourth and final single from their third studio album, Architecture & Morality. In order to avoid exploiting the album, the single was only released in the Benelux region.

== History ==
"She's Leaving" was written in January 1981, and an early version was played in France and Canada during OMD's tour in spring that year. They made multiple attempts to record the song, but they "got really bored with it quickly" so these were abandoned. After discovering an old version recorded at their studio The Gramophone Suite in Liverpool that the band had forgotten about, they tried again to record the song, this time similarly to the old version. Recorded at The Manor, the song was slowed down and simplified, leading to the final recorded version.

Noted for its simplicity, the song only features a drum machine, bass guitar, Vox Jaguar organ and a Korg M-500 Micro Preset synthesiser. It was the first time the band had recorded a 'story-telling' type song; it has been noted as reminiscent of the Beatles' "She's Leaving Home".

The band's label Dindisc (an imprint of Virgin) suggested releasing "She's Leaving" as the fourth single from Architecture & Morality. However, the band rejected this idea, not wanting to overexploit the album. Lead singer Andy McCluskey later admitted they regretted not releasing the song as a single, putting it down to being young and pretentious. In September 1981, prior to the album's release, Ian Cranna of Smash Hits had noted that "She's Leaving" "would make an excellent single".

"She's Leaving" was given a small-scale release as a single in the Benelux region in June 1982. The release was permitted there as the album was top of the charts in both Belgium and the Netherlands at the time. The B-side was "The Romance of the Telescope (Unfinished)", which had previously been used as the B-side to "Joan of Arc". A promotional video was also filmed whilst the band performing for Dutch television programme TopPop. However, the single failed to chart.

== Reception and legacy ==
Robin Denselow of The Guardian described "She's Leaving" as "the sort of song that Paul McCartney might have written if he'd grown up with the synthesizer bands of '81." AllMusic's Ned Raggett later said that the track "achieves its own polished pop perfection", while Oliver Hurley of Classic Pop labelled it "the great OMD single that never was"

Greek band Marsheaux recorded a 2012 cover version of "She's Leaving", calling it a "tribute to a classic track". God Is in the TV critic Jonathan Wright felt that Goldfrapp's "Number 1" (2005) was influenced by "She's Leaving".
