= Walking on the Milky Way (song) =

1996 single by Orchestral Manoeuvres in the Dark

Single by Orchestral Manoeuvres in the Dark

from the album Universal
- B-side: "Mathew Street"; "The New Dark Age"
- Released: 5 August 1996
- Studio: Townhouse (London, England)
- Length: 4:38 (album version); 4:04 (single edit)
- Label: Virgin
- Songwriters: Andy McCluskey; Nigel Ipinson; Keith Small
- Producers: Andy McCluskey; Matthew Vaughan; David Nicholas

Orchestral Manoeuvres in the Dark singles chronology
"Everyday" (1993)	"Walking on the Milky Way" (1996)	"Universal" (1996)

Music video
- "Walking on the Milky Way" on YouTube

"Walking on the Milky Way" is a song by the English electronic band Orchestral Manoeuvres in the Dark (OMD). It was released as a single on 5 August 1996 and appeared on their Universal album a month later. The song reached number 17 on the UK singles chart, becoming the group's first UK top-20 hit in over five years, and their last UK top-40 single. The band were flanked by a full string orchestra for their Top of the Pops performance of the song broadcast on 16 August 1996.

== Critical reception ==
Simon Williams of NME called the song "seethingly splendid" and "euphorically daft". In a retrospective article, AllMusic critic Dave Thompson praised Andy McCluskey's "rousing" vocal, and wrote, "With its sublime melody and a suitably anthemic chorus, this stellar single, released in August 1996, was a deserving Top 20 British hit." Jack Watkins of Record Collector described the track as a "powerful song" that "went largely unnoticed by radio stations".

== Band response ==
McCluskey commented on the track in a November 2001 interview with The Guardian:

"I sweated blood over... 'Walking on the Milky Way', which I thought was about as good a song as I could write. [BBC] Radio 1 wouldn't play it, because it wasn't perceived as trendy by their target audience. Because Radio 1 wouldn't play it, Woolworths wouldn't stock it. The upshot of it was that one of the best songs I'd ever written struggled to get to number 17 in the [UK] charts. I just thought: 'Screw this, I'm not going to bang my head against a brick wall'."

This frustration led McCluskey to abandon OMD, and form and write songs for Liverpool girl group Atomic Kitten (alongside erstwhile OMD member Stuart Kershaw).

== Versions and B-sides ==
The same version of the song was used for the single and album release. A single edit was made for the promotional single, and appeared on the compilations The OMD Singles (1998) and Messages: Greatest Hits (2008). The B-side "Mathew Street", co-written with former Kraftwerk member Karl Bartos, references the location of Eric's Club (where OMD gave their first public performance) and The Cavern Club in Liverpool. The track is written in the style of a Sgt. Pepper's-period Beatles song. The CD single also features "The New Dark Age", a slower electronic ballad whose title references the band's 1981 song "The New Stone Age" from their Architecture & Morality album. It was written and performed by McCluskey alone.

== Promotional video ==
A promo video was made for the song mostly featuring Andy McCluskey singing the song in various locations. The video makes use of slow motion and other special visual effects reflecting the tempo and grandiose style of the song. It was directed by Howard Greenhalgh.

== Track listings ==
UK CD and cassette single

1. "Walking on the Milky Way" (Andy McCluskey, Nigel Ipinson, Keith Small)
2. "Mathew Street" (McCluskey, Karl Bartos)
3. "The New Dark Age" (McCluskey)

UK limited-edition CD single

1. "Walking on the Milky Way" (McCluskey, Ipinson, Small)
2. "Joan of Arc" (live) (McCluskey)
3. "Maid of Orleans" (live) (McCluskey)
4. "Walking on Air" (live) (OMD, Kershaw, Massett)
- All live tracks were recorded at Bonn Biskuithalle on 16 November 1993.

European CD single

1. "Walking on the Milky Way" (McCluskey, Ipinson, Small) – 4:38
2. "Mathew Street" (McCluskey, Bartos) – 3:33

== Charts ==
Weekly chart performance
Chart (1996)	Peak position
Austria (Ö3 Austria Top 40)	16
Czech Republic (IFPI CR)	4
Europe (Eurochart Hot 100)	19
Europe Airplay (European Hit Radio)	13
Germany (GfK)	53
Poland Airplay (Music & Media)	5
Scottish Singles Sales (Official Charts)	23
Spain Airplay (Music & Media)	3
Sweden (Sverigetopplistan)	49
UK Airplay (Music & Media)	8
UK Singles (Official Charts)	17
