= Ben Kelly =

Ben Kelly may refer to:

- Ben Kelly (designer), English graphic and interior designer
- Ben Kelly (gridiron football) (born 1978), American football player
