= Organisation (album) =

Studio album by Orchestral Manoeuvres in the Dark
- Released: 24 October 1980
- Recorded: 1980
- Studios: Gramophone Suite (Liverpool); Ridge Farm (Rusper); Advision (London); The Manor (Shipton-on-Cherwell)
- Genres: Synth-pop; new wave
- Length: 40:05
- Label: Dindisc
- Producers: OMD; Mike Howlett

Orchestral Manoeuvres in the Dark chronology
Orchestral Manoeuvres in the Dark (1980)	Organisation (1980)	Architecture & Morality (1981)

Singles from Organisation
- 1. "Enola Gay" Released: 26 September 1980

Organisation is the second studio album by the English electronic band Orchestral Manoeuvres in the Dark (OMD), released on 24 October 1980 by Dindisc. On Organisation the group worked with a producer for the first time, enlisting former Gong bassist Mike Howlett, while session musician Malcolm Holmes became the band's full-time drummer. The record is noted for its dark, melancholic tone in comparison to other OMD releases.

Organisation met with favourable reviews and provided OMD with their first top-10 album in the United Kingdom, where it peaked at number six on the UK Albums Chart. "Enola Gay" was the only single taken from the record, and was the group's fourth entry on the UK Singles Chart, reaching number eight. Organisation was remastered and re-released in 2003, with several bonus tracks.

== Background ==
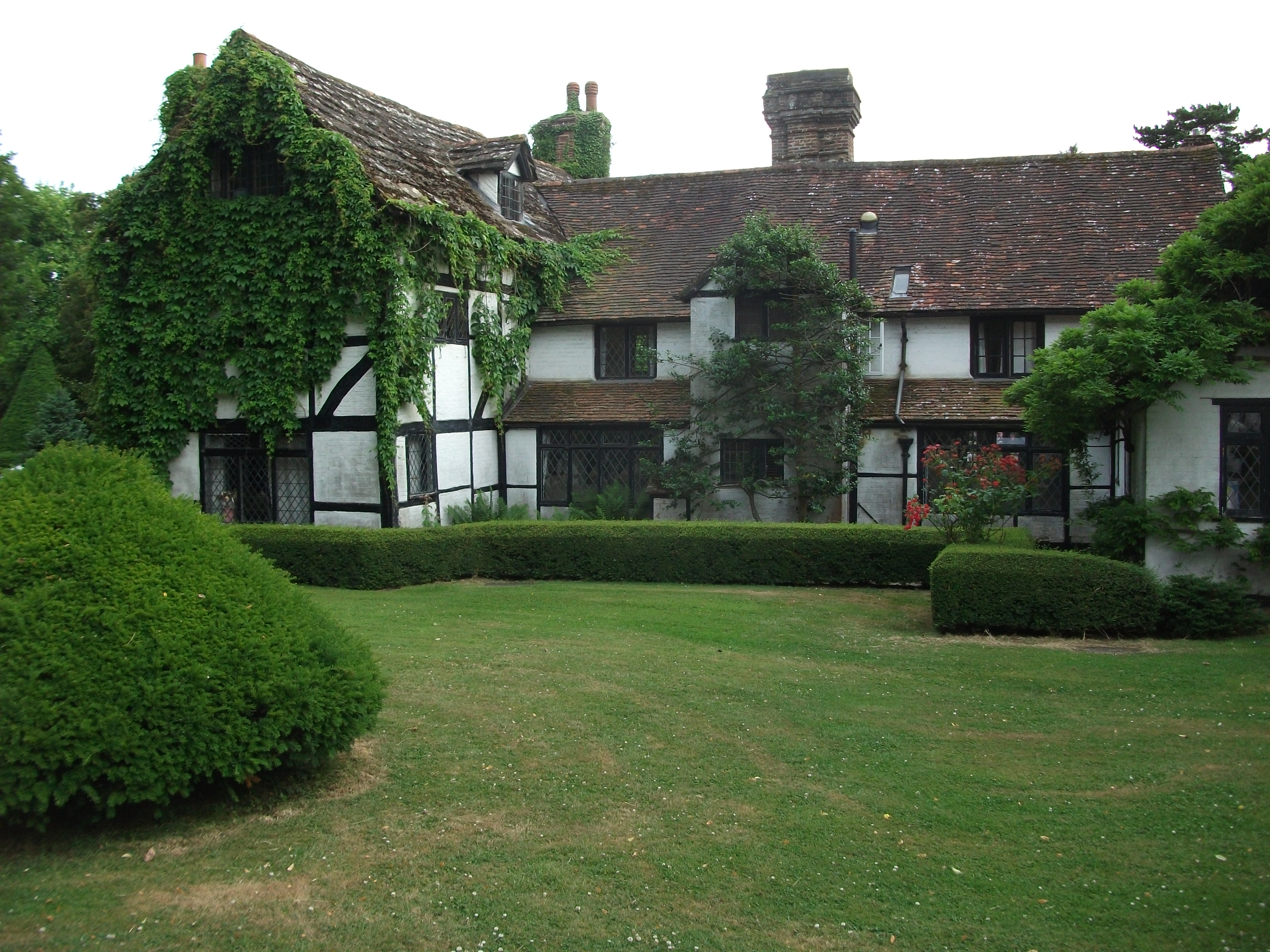
Much of Organisation was recorded at Ridge Farm in Rusper, with assistance from producer Mike Howlett

OMD wrote the bulk of Organisation in June and July 1980. Dindisc requested a new studio album before Christmas; lead vocalist Andy McCluskey recalled, "We were too naive to disagree." Backing tracks were recorded at the band's Gramophone Suite in Liverpool. They later moved on to Ridge Farm in Rusper to record vocals and additional instrumentation, working with Mike Howlett (former bassist of Gong). This marked the first time the group had collaborated with a producer; keyboardist Paul Humphreys said, "We learned a lot from [Howlett]. We were young and didn't understand the recording process and he guided us and pushed us – he was sensitive to our more esoteric, experimental side." Additional recording was completed at Advision, London, and The Manor, Shipton-on-Cherwell.

Organisation features a darker, more melancholic tone than OMD's other work. The band had been Factory label-mates, and had played many gigs with Salford band Joy Division, whose frontman Ian Curtis died by suicide during the writing of the album. OMD's compositions were influenced by Joy Division's moody sound, with "Statues" being partially inspired by Curtis himself; the record also drew from krautrock influences. McCluskey handled the majority of the songwriting, as Humphreys devoted more time to his relationship with California-based Maureen Udin. Malcolm Holmes, who had drummed for precursor outfit the Id and provided session musicianship for OMD (notably on "Julia's Song", from the group's debut studio album), was recruited as a full-time band member, replacing the TEAC tape recorder named "Winston".

Sole single "Enola Gay" had little in common with the downbeat feel of the rest of the record, despite its bleak subject matter. The song was written at the same time as the band's debut studio album, as was "Motion and Heart", which was considered as a second single. "The Misunderstanding" is a holdover from the Id. "The More I See You" is a cover of a song written by Mack Gordon and Harry Warren in 1945, and popularised by Chris Montez in 1966. The track began as an original composition, but McCluskey found himself singing the words to "The More I See You" over the song, which morphed into a cover version. OMD's arrangement is radically different from that of previous versions.

"Promise" features Humphreys' first lead vocal performance, and represents his first solo composition on an OMD album. "Stanlow" was written about the Stanlow Oil Refinery in Ellesmere Port, Cheshire, where McCluskey's father and sister worked. OMD cherished the view of the refinery lit up at night, often observing it when returning from tours. McCluskey's father granted the band access to the site to sample sounds from the machinery; a diesel pump forms the rhythmic opening of "Stanlow". "VCL XI" was the name of McCluskey and Humphreys' short-lived, pre-OMD group, which itself was named after a valve on the back of Kraftwerk's fifth studio album Radio-Activity (1975; the name of the valve is written "VCL 11" on the Radio-Activity sleeve). The record's title is a homage to the band Organisation, a precursor to Kraftwerk.

As with all of OMD's early album covers, the artwork was designed by Peter Saville Associates. It features a photograph by Richard Nutt of the cloud-covered peak of Marsco in the Red Cuillin mountains, on the Isle of Skye, Scotland.

== Critical reception ==
Professional ratings
Review scores
Source	Rating
AllMusic	4/5 stars
Alternative Rock: The Best Musicians & Recordings	8/10
The Big Issue	4.5/5 stars
Music Story	4/5 stars
Ondarock	9/10
Record Mirror	4/5 stars
Sounds	5/5 stars
Tom Hull – on the Web	A−
Uncut	7/10
Western Morning News	4/5 stars

Organisation met with favourable reviews. Dave McCullough of Sounds awarded the album a full five stars, asserting, "[OMD] are a youth-mirror more valuable than any Street-Chic punk outfit I can imagine... warmer than your so-called 'warm' bands, your [Bruce] Springsteens and your [Graham] Parkers could ever be. They reflect the young horror of where and how we live but, in their songs at least, they face the problems with an irrepressible intuitive sense that makes the best pop of any time." Record Mirror's Daniela Soave said of the record, "Full of drama and numerous layers, it conjures up many images, so much so that it could almost be a film soundtrack... outstanding." Flexipop said that on Organisation, "the best of all the electric bands come up with another winner".

In The Age, John Teerds wrote, "Much of the music is hook-laden and highly-memorable. Orchestral Manoeuvres... have a very distinctive sound which is hard to beat when you're looking for the best in a modern, electronic style." Lynden Barber of Melody Maker observed, "OMD have produced not so much a collection of songs as a pervading mood, a feeling of restlessness spiked by an unsettling edge that never allows the music to descend into complacency... a very healthy step forward." Organisation received more muted reviews from Smash Hits' Mark Ellen and NME's Adrian Thrills, both of whom noted a reduced presence of the pop sensibilities heard in OMD's previous work. Ellen encouraged the group to "cease clinging to the idea of being a serious 'experimental' band and go all-out for the shameless synth-pop single".

In a retrospective article, Ryan Leas of Stereogum dubbed Organisation "one of the great albums from the early synth-pop era", on which OMD were "forging new sonic territory but also capturing the feeling of the times". Trouser Press wrote, "[Organisation] pays attention to ensure variation in the tunes... With nods to John Foxx and David Bowie, OMD overlays melodies to dramatic effect; the performances are excellent." Critic Dave Thompson praised the record's "smart lyrics, sharp songs... and genuinely innovative use of electronics", while AllMusic's Ned Raggett said it is "packed with a number of gems, showing [OMD]'s reach and ability continuing to increase".

== Legacy ==
Classic Pop wrote that Organisation has been recognised as a "gothic masterpiece". Some have viewed it as a "lost" classic of its time, given the greater renown of OMD's Architecture & Morality (1981) and Dazzle Ships (1983). The record, and its cover art, have nevertheless been ranked among the best of 1980. Organisation was featured in Télérama's top 50 rock and pop albums of the 1980s. In his 2023 list of the 50 greatest synth-pop albums in history, Paste critic Matt Mitchell included Architecture & Morality but stated that Organisation – excluded under a "one album per artist" rule – was "equally worthy". The record has also been noted as influential, and a factor in the emergence of minimal wave music.

Organisation and predecessor Orchestral Manoeuvres in the Dark (1980) have been cited as inspirations by the electronic acts Depeche Mode, LCD Soundsystem and Moby. Porcupine Tree frontman Steven Wilson named Organisation as an influence and one of his "top 5 not-so-guilty pleasures of all time". He said, "It's not [OMD's] biggest record, but I think it's probably their best. It's got that Teutonic, Germanic kind of cold wave thing going on, which I've always been a sucker for." Nivek Ogre of Skinny Puppy listed Organisation among the five albums he "can't live without", noting that it "changed [his] perceptions" musically. Ogre added, "[It] gave me the warm fuzzies within that dark mechanized-seeming world created; full of waltz timings and strong moods. Amazing dance music for mutant youngsters like myself." Youth Code identified the album as one that helped shape their sound.

Organisation has received further endorsements from DJ and record producer Paul van Dyk, composer Yann Tiersen, No Doubt bassist Tony Kanal, Nation of Language singer Ian Devaney, and the electronic artists Mike "μ-Ziq" Paradinas and Public Service Broadcasting. Van Dyk and Tiersen each cited the album as the first they ever acquired, with Van Dyk adding, "It was extremely influential. Early electronic, but also melodies and poppy elements, the general imprint of what later came for me in music." Physicist and musician Brian Cox wrote in 2018, "I eventually persuaded my parents to buy Organisation, an album of gentle darkness beneath clouded skies, which I fell in love with aged 12 and still love today." Elsewhere, graphic designer and musician Brett Wickens (co-founder of the bands Spoons and Ceramic Hello) was impacted by the record's artwork and "extremely moving" musical content.

== Track listing ==
=== Original release ===
Side one
No.	Title	Writer(s)	Length
1.	"Enola Gay"	Andy McCluskey	3:33
2.	"2nd Thought"	McCluskey	4:15
3.	"VCL XI"	Paul Humphreys; McCluskey	3:50
4.	"Motion and Heart"	Humphreys; McCluskey	3:16
5.	"Statues"	McCluskey	4:30

Side two
No.	Title	Writer(s)	Length
6.	"The Misunderstanding"	Humphreys; McCluskey	4:55
7.	"The More I See You"	Harry Warren; Mack Gordon	4:11
8.	"Promise"	Humphreys	4:51
9.	"Stanlow"	Humphreys; McCluskey	6:30
Total length:			40:05

=== US release (OMD) ===
Organisation was not formally released in the US; instead Epic Records released a compilation in 1981. This US release collects material from Organisation and the first OMD studio album, but retains the sleeve-art of the debut LP.

Side one
No.	Title	Writer(s)	Length
1.	"Enola Gay"	McCluskey	3:31
2.	"2nd Thought"	McCluskey	4:12
3.	"Bunker Soldiers"	Humphreys; McCluskey	2:51
4.	"Almost"	Humphreys; McCluskey	3:46
5.	"Electricity"	Humphreys; McCluskey	3:32
6.	"Statues"	Humphreys; McCluskey	4:08

Side two
No.	Title	Writer(s)	Length
7.	"The Misunderstanding"	Humphreys; McCluskey	4:45
8.	"Julia's Song"	Humphreys; McCluskey; Julia Kneale	4:32
9.	"Motion and Heart"	Humphreys; McCluskey	3:13
10.	"Messages"	Humphreys; McCluskey	3:59
11.	"Stanlow"	Humphreys; McCluskey	6:30

=== 2003 remaster ===
No.	Title	Writer(s)	Length
1.	"Enola Gay"	McCluskey	3:33
2.	"2nd Thought"	McCluskey	4:15
3.	"VCL XI"	Humphreys; McCluskey	3:50
4.	"Motion and Heart"	Humphreys; McCluskey	3:16
5.	"Statues"	McCluskey	4:30
6.	"The Misunderstanding"	Humphreys; McCluskey	4:55
7.	"The More I See You"	Warren; Gordon	4:11
8.	"Promise"	Humphreys	4:51
9.	"Stanlow"	Humphreys; McCluskey	6:40
10.	"Annex"	Humphreys; McCluskey	4:33
11.	"Introducing Radios" (live)	Humphreys; McCluskey	1:27
12.	"Distance Fades Between Us" (live)	Humphreys; McCluskey	3:44
13.	"Progress" (live)	Humphreys; McCluskey	2:57
14.	"Once When I Was Six" (live)	Humphreys; McCluskey	3:12
15.	"Electricity" (DinDisc 1980 version)	Humphreys; McCluskey	3:43
Total length:			59:37

==== Notes ====
"Annex" was the B-side to "Enola Gay". "Introducing Radios", "Distance Fades Between Us", "Progress", and "Once When I Was Six" are 1978 performances at The Factory in Manchester, that were originally available on a 7" released with the first 10,000 copies of Organisation, and initial copies of the cassette (which had a special silver cover/inserts).

== Personnel ==
Orchestral Manoeuvres in the Dark

- Paul Humphreys – synthesizers, electronic organ, electronic and acoustic piano, rhythm programming, acoustic and electronic percussion and vocals
- Andy McCluskey – synthesizer, bass guitar, electronic organ, treated acoustic piano, rhythm programming, acoustic and electronic percussion and vocals
- Malcolm Holmes – drums and percussion

== Charts ==
=== Weekly charts ===
Weekly chart performance for Organisation
Chart (1980–1981)	Peak position
New Zealand Albums (RMNZ)	18
Spanish Albums (AFYVE)	15
UK Albums (Official Charts)	6

=== Year-end charts ===
Year-end chart performance for Organisation
Chart (1980)	Position
UK Albums (OCC)	95

== Certifications ==
Certifications for Organisation
Region	Certification	Certified units/sales
United Kingdom (BPI)	Gold	100,000^{^}
^{^} Shipments figures based on certification alone.
