= Electricity (Orchestral Manoeuvres in the Dark song) =

Single by Orchestral Manoeuvres in the Dark

from the album Orchestral Manoeuvres in the Dark
- B-side: "Almost"
- Released: 21 May 1979
- Recorded: Henry's Studio, Liverpool; Cargo Studios, Rochdale
- Genre: Synth-pop; electropop; new wave
- Length: 3:44 (first single version); 3:36 (second single version); 3:32 (third single/album version)
- Label: Factory – FAC 6 (1st release); Dindisc – DIN 2 (2nd & 3rd releases); Virgin EMI (2019 re-release)
- Songwriters: Paul Humphreys; Andy McCluskey
- Producers: Orchestral Manoeuvres in the Dark; Paul Collister; Martin Zero

Orchestral Manoeuvres in the Dark singles chronology
"Electricity" (1979)	"Red Frame/White Light" (1980)

Alternative cover
- Cover of the 2019 re-issue

Music video
- "Orchestral Manoeuvres in the Dark – Electricity" on YouTube

"Electricity" is the 1979 debut single by the English electronic band Orchestral Manoeuvres in the Dark (OMD), featured on their eponymous debut album the following year. Andy McCluskey and Paul Humphreys sing the lead vocals on the track together in unison, although Humphreys is positioned higher in the mix. Recognised as one of the most influential singles of its era, "Electricity" was integral to the rise of the UK's synth-pop movement and inspired major artists such as Depeche Mode, Duran Duran and Simple Minds.

The track is a holdover from defunct Wirral group the Id (who were led by McCluskey and Humphreys), and features a melodic synthesizer break as opposed to a sung chorus. Following OMD's release of "Electricity" on Factory Records, the band were offered a recording contract with Dindisc, who twice re-issued the single. It achieved limited success on the UK singles chart, peaking at no. 99 in early 1980, but found popularity in nightclubs. A 2019 re-release, through Virgin EMI, topped the UK Vinyl Singles Chart.

== Background ==
"Electricity" was the first song that Andy McCluskey and Paul Humphreys wrote together at the age of 16. It addresses society's wasteful usage of energy resources. Inspired by Kraftwerk's "Radioactivity", the track was described by McCluskey as "a faster, punkier version of 'Radioactivity' with a chorus". As with single "Messages" from the same album, a sung chorus is substituted for a melodic synthesizer break.

McCluskey and Humphreys originally recorded "Electricity" as members of OMD precursor group the Id, in early 1978. After OMD's first concert, opening for Joy Division in a 1978 appearance at Eric's Club in Liverpool, McCluskey was inspired to send a demo of the song to Factory Records founder Tony Wilson. They later heard that while he was not impressed with it, his wife was, so he bought it from them and released it as a single. Its ensuing success led to them receiving a seven-album record deal with Dindisc, worth over £250,000.

Humphreys and McCluskey sing the lead vocals on the track together in unison, although Humphreys is positioned higher in the mix.

== Reception ==
"Electricity" was a hit with veteran DJ John Peel, who gave the song regular play on his late-night radio show; as a result, the British music press quickly picked up on the song. Adrian Thrills of NME cited it as "the best example of Factory Records to date – excellent, melodic, synthesiser pop". He also lauded B-side "Almost", calling it "a doleful, heartsick slab of electronic angst". In a review of 1980 single "Enola Gay", Jonathan Green of The Canberra Times described both it and "Electricity" as a "super pop song".

Conversely, Garry Bushell gave a negative review in Sounds, in which he remarked: "If Mike Oldfield was ten years younger and a Tubeway Army fan, this is what he'd sound like... who wants to listen to a bunch of Scousers whining about electricity anyway?" (Bushell later called his "less than generous" appraisal a "mistake".) David Hepworth, who re-assessed the track in the same publication, wrote that OMD's sound "commands your attention" and lauded the single for being "packaged with as much taste as it's played". "Electricity" reached no. 2 on the Sounds Alternative Chart in the summer of 1979 and became popular in nightclubs.

In a retrospective article, Ned Raggett of AllMusic described the song as "pure zeitgeist, a celebration of synth pop's incipient reign". Critic Dave Thompson called it a "perfect electro-pop number".

== Legacy ==
Andrew Trendell of NME recognised "Electricity" as a "classic" and "one of the most influential singles of the post-punk era". The Guardian's Mary Harron wrote that the song "pioneered a new electronic pop", while Mike Mettler of Digital Trends said it "is generally acknowledged as being the pioneering inspirational synth-pop track for many early electronic artists". Author and musician Rudi Esch described "Electricity" as "a song that started a new movement"; Esch borrowed its title for his book, Electri_City: The Düsseldorf School of Electronic Music (2016). John Earls of Classic Pop called the track "groundbreaking", as did AFI and Blaqk Audio frontman, Davey Havok.

"I instantly loved the drum machines and synthesized pulses... But I also loved the dreamy vocals that somehow made me think of a futuristic Buddy Holly lost somewhere out in the heavens, looking down on a world so out of control that it no longer made sense. Above all I was jealous of the melodies."

— Jim Kerr of Simple Minds

"Electricity" was influential on artists including Depeche Mode and Simple Minds. Original Depeche Mode bandleader, Vince Clarke (later principal songwriter of Yazoo and Erasure), told the BBC, "When I was 18 or 19 I heard a single called 'Electricity' by Orchestral Manoeuvres in the Dark. It sounded so different from anything I'd heard; that really made me want to make electronic music, 'cause it was so unique." The song was a fixture in the DJ sets of Duran Duran's Nick Rhodes; bandmate John Taylor cited it as an early influence on the group. The track has also impacted artists such as Alphaville, No Doubt, Ministry's Al Jourgensen, Take That's Gary Barlow, and Nation of Language, whose formation it directly inspired. "Electricity" and its cover art were highly influential on the parallel music and graphic design careers of Brett Wickens (co-founder of the groups Spoons and Ceramic Hello). BBC Radio's Steve Lamacq has named the "wonderful" song as his inspiration to become a radio DJ, noting that he wanted to afford air time to similar, "curious" music.

"Electricity" has been praised by other musicians. Ted Ottaviano of Book of Love, a band heavily influenced by OMD, said, "I've never heard anything so simple and sophisticated all at the same time... [It's] one of my all-time faves." Mute Records founder Daniel Miller wrote, "I remember thinking, 'My God, that's an amazing pop song'." Philip Oakey of the Human League called it a "brilliant single", while David Balfe of The Teardrop Explodes referred to an "electronica classic" that is "known and loved by us all". Paula Gilmer, lead singer of Tiny Magnetic Pets, recalled a conversation in which U2 frontman Bono told her that "Electricity" was one of his favourite records.

The track has been covered by artists including NOFX, Apoptygma Berzerk and MGMT. Q argued that "The Kids Aren't Alright", by punk rock band the Offspring, "borrows heavily" from the song; the magazine pointed to NOFX's punk cover of "Electricity" as evidence. In its various releases, the track has been ranked among the best of 1979, 1980 and 1981. In May 1980, ZigZag readers voted it one of the top 20 singles of the past year. It has since appeared in lists such as Electronic Sound's "100 Greatest Electronic Tracks of All Time", Radioeins' "100 Best Electronic Songs", Classic Pop's "Top 40 New Romantic Songs", and Radio X's "20 Best Singles Released on Factory Records". "Electricity" was also featured in the Rough Trade article, "Liverpool in 20 Songs".

== "Electricity" and "Almost" versions ==
There are many different versions of the two songs that were present on OMD's debut single. After the band left Factory Records, DinDisc attempted twice to score a hit with "Electricity". Consequently, four versions of "Electricity" and three of "Almost" exist.

Version I

- "Electricity" (3:44) and "Almost" (3:43) were originally recorded at Henry's Studio, West Kirby, Liverpool in January 1979 and produced by the band and their manager Paul Collister.

Version II

- "Electricity" (3:36) and "Almost" (3:50) were subsequently re-recorded at Cargo Studios, Rochdale and produced by Martin Hannett under the moniker Martin Zero, to be released by Factory Records.
- The band felt Hannett had overproduced their songs somewhat, and preferred their original recordings, so a compromise was reached for the versions used on the single. This first Factory single contains the band's version of "Electricity" (3:44) and the Hannett version of "Almost" (3:50).
- Version I of "Almost" (3:43) remained unreleased until appearing on the 2001 compilation; Navigation: The OMD B-Sides.

Version III

- The album versions of "Electricity" (3:32) and "Almost" (3:40) differ from the previous versions, and were used for the third and final release of the single. "Electricity" was remixed from the original Hannett version. It is also the version used on the 1988 Best Of and the 1998 Singles collections and is the best-known version of the song. The album version of "Almost" is similarly a remix of Hannett's version.

Version IV ("Electricity" only)

- A fourth mix of "Electricity" (3:43) was produced by Mike Howlett. This version of "Electricity" was recorded during the Organisation sessions when the band decided to extend the instrumental section in the middle of the song. It was initially released on the Dindisc 1980 compilation album on 31 October 1980. In 2003, it was released on CD as a bonus track on the re-issue of Organisation.

The Micronauts Remix

- A remix by dance music act The Micronauts was released in 1998 both as part of The OMD Remixes release and as part of the bonus disc of the special edition The OMD Singles (France only).

== Release history ==
=== Singles ===
The following singles have been released:

Date	Catalogue	"Electricity"	"Almost"	Sleeve	Notes
21 May 1979	Factory FAC6	Version I	Version II	Special 'black on black' sleeve, limited to 5000 copies.	OMD's first single.
28 September 1979	DinDisc DIN2	Version II	Version II	Standard white on black printing, with studio details on back of sleeve.	The single is re-released to coincide with the band signing to DinDisc.
28 March 1980	DinDisc DIN2	Version III	Version III	Standard white on black printing, without studio details on back of sleeve.	Third attempt at achieving a hit. Peaked at no. 99 on the UK singles chart.
27 September 2019	7748190	Version II	Vince Clarke remix	Red on white adaptation of the original Peter Saville design.	40th anniversary 7" clear vinyl re-issue. Debuted at no. 1 on the UK Vinyl Singles Chart.

=== Albums ===
"Electricity" and "Almost" have been released on the following OMD albums:

Date	Album	Song	Version	Notes
22 February 1980	Orchestral Manoeuvres in the Dark	"Electricity"	Version III	
22 February 1980	Orchestral Manoeuvres in the Dark	"Almost"	Version III	
29 February 1988	The Best of OMD	"Electricity"	Version III	
29 February 1988	The Best of OMD	"Electricity"	music video	on the VHS version of the album
28 September 1998	The OMD Singles	"Electricity"	Version III	
24 April 2000	Peel Sessions 1979–1983	"Electricity"	Version I	Bonus track, subtitled "Factory Version 1979"
14 May 2001	Navigation: The OMD B-Sides	"Almost"	Version I	Subtitled "Alternate Version"
December 2002	The Id	"Electricity"		A 1978 recording by The Id, the pre-OMD band.
10 March 2003	Orchestral Manoeuvres in the Dark reissue	"Electricity"	Version III	
10 March 2003	Orchestral Manoeuvres in the Dark reissue	"Almost"	Version III	
10 March 2003	Orchestral Manoeuvres in the Dark reissue	"Electricity"	Version II	Bonus track, subtitled "Hannett/Cargo Studios Version"
10 March 2003	Orchestral Manoeuvres in the Dark reissue	"Almost"	Version II	Bonus track, subtitled "Hannett/Cargo Studios Version"
10 March 2003	Organisation reissue	"Electricity"	Version IV	Bonus track, subtitled "Dindisc 1980 Version"
29 September 2008	Messages: Greatest Hits	"Electricity"	Version III	
29 September 2008	Messages: Greatest Hits	"Electricity"	music video	

== Sleeve design ==
The sleeve was designed by Factory's designer Peter Saville. The band and Saville met in a Rochdale pub and exchanged ideas. Saville told them about a book of avant-garde musical scores which he'd come across. Andy McCluskey said that he sometimes wrote down the tunes he composed in a similar shorthand. This led to the unusual graphics that feature on the sleeve. Saville suggested to use shiny black ink on black paper. Neither OMD nor Tony Wilson believed it could be done, but Saville persuaded a printer to do the job. The thermographic printing was a success, but the place set on fire three times, so eventually only 5,000 sleeves were printed. The reissue sleeves were standard white on black printed sleeves.

== 2019 re-release ==
A special edition of the single was released on 27 September 2019 by Virgin EMI, as part of the group's 40th anniversary celebrations. The A-side features the Hannett/Cargo Studios version of "Electricity", incorrectly listed as the Factory Records version, while the B-side has a new remix of "Almost" by Vince Clarke. The limited-edition release is pressed on clear vinyl and the sleeve is an adaptation of the original Peter Saville design. This version debuted on the UK Vinyl Singles Chart at no. 1.

== Track listing ==
=== 1979 original release ===
Side one
No.	Title	Length
1.	"Electricity"	3:44

Side two
No.	Title	Length
1.	"Almost"	3:50

=== 2019 re-issue ===
Side one
No.	Title	Length
1.	"Electricity (Hannett/Cargo Studios Version) (Note: This is falsely listed as the Factory Records version.)"	3:34

Side two
No.	Title	Length
1.	"Almost (Vince Clarke remix)"	4.46
