= Dindisc =

British record label

- Parent company: Virgin Records
- Founder: Carol Wilson
- Genre: New wave; post-punk
- Country of origin: UK

Dindisc (often rendered DinDisc) was a UK record label, an imprint of Virgin Records but operating semi-independently, which issued new releases from mid-1979 through early 1982. It is no longer active, but CD reissues on Virgin still mention the label and have Dindisc catalogue numbers.

The imprint was founded and run by Carol Wilson, who had previously discovered Sting and signed him to Virgin's music publishing company. Talking about the signing of Orchestral Manoeuvres in the Dark to Dindisc, she later said: "OMD were a perfect fit for what I had in mind for DinDisc — they had a serious, artistic side with real depth, as well as a commercial, pop side. That duality was reflected in all the early DinDisc signings, like Martha and the Muffins, and then the Monochrome Set."

Many of the company's sleeves were designed by the in-house designer Peter Saville. Saville had started at Factory Records, but came to Wilson's attention when she signed Factory band OMD; she had been particularly interested by Saville's thermographic paper sleeve for the Factory release of "Electricity". Saville delivered the artwork for the Dindisc release of "Electricity" and asked Wilson if Dindisc needed an art director. Saville and Ben Kelly won a Designers and Art Directors Award for their work on the album Orchestral Manoeuvres in the Dark.

The label's first release (DIN-1) was "Where's the Boy for Me" by the Rezillos, released in September 1979. The label's most notable chart successes included Martha and the Muffins' "Echo Beach" (UK #5 in 1980) and several early singles by OMD, including "Enola Gay", "Souvenir", "Joan of Arc" and "Maid of Orleans (The Waltz Joan of Arc)", all of which hit the UK top 10 in 1980/81.

The label ceased operations after the release of Hot Gossip's "I Don't Depend on You" (DIN-39) in February 1982, after Wilson failed to obtain a shareholding. The Orchestral Manoeuvres in the Dark single "Maid of Orleans (The Waltz Joan of Arc)" had the final number in catalogue sequence (DIN-40), but was actually released a few weeks earlier, in January 1982. The dissolution of Dindisc led to Saville and Brett Wickens establishing their own studio, Peter Saville Associates.

== Discography ==
=== Albums ===
| No. | Artist | Title | Format | Date | Notes |
|---|---|---|---|---|---|
| DID-1 | Martha and the Muffins | Metro Music | LP, cass | 1980-02 | |
| DID-2 | Orchestral Manoeuvres in the Dark | Orchestral Manoeuvres in the Dark | LP, cass | 1980-02-22 | Multiple sleeve colours |
| DID-3 | The Revillos | Rev Up | LP | 1980-03 | |
| DID-4 | The Monochrome Set | Strange Boutique | LP, cass | 1980-02-19 | |
| DID-5 | Martha and the Muffins | Trance and Dance | LP, cass | 1980-09 | |
| DID-6 | Orchestral Manoeuvres in the Dark | Organisation | LP, cass | 1980-10-24 | Initial copies with 33 rpm 7-inch EP DEP-2 |
| DID-7 | Dedringer | Direct Line | LP | 1981 | |
| DID-8 | The Monochrome Set | Love Zombies | LP | 1980-10-17 | |
| DID-9 | Nash the Slash | Children of the Night | LP, cass | 1981 | |
| DID-10 | Martha and the Muffins | This Is the Ice Age | LP, cass | 1981 | |
| DID-11 | Modern Eon | Fiction Tales | LP | 1981 | |
| DID-12 | Orchestral Manoeuvres in the Dark | Architecture & Morality | LP, cass | 1981-11-08 | Initial pressings in die-cut sleeves |
| DID-13 | Arlene Phillips' Hot Gossip | Geisha Boys and Temple Girls | LP | 1981 | Produced by Heaven 17 as the British Electric Foundation |
| DONE-1 | Various Artists | Dindisc 1980 | LP | 1980 | Initial copies with a poster-sized game |

=== Singles ===
| No. | Artist | Title | Format | Date | Notes |
|---|---|---|---|---|---|
| DIN-1 | The Revillos | Where's The Boy For Me? (2:00) / The Fiend (1:59) | 7" | 1979-09-07 | |
| DIN-2 | Orchestral Manoeuvres in the Dark | Electricity (3:33) / Almost (3:50) | 7" | 1979-09-28 | Both tracks as recorded by Martin Hannett |
| DIN-2 | Orchestral Manoeuvres in the Dark | Electricity (3:32) / Almost (3:40) | 7" | 1980-03-31 | Both tracks album versions, remixed from Hannett recordings; same catalogue number, same sleeve front, different sleeve back |
| DIN-3 | Duggie Campbell | Enough To Make You Mine / Steamin' | 7" | 1979 | Produced by Sting |
| DIN-4 | Martha and the Muffins | Insect Love (4:10) / Cheesies And Gum (3:05) | 7" | 1979-10 | |
| DIN-5 | The Revillos | Motor Bike Beat / No Such Luck | 7" | 1980 | |
| DIN-6 | Orchestral Manoeuvres in the Dark | Red Frame/White Light (3:15) / I Betray My Friends (3:50) | 7", 12" | 1980-02-01 | 7" and 12" identical |
| DIN-7 | The Brians | My Brother's Famous / Brian's Sister Sue | 7" | 1979 | Fictitious group; all members are allegedly brothers of famous musicians and celebrities, all named Brian |
| DIN-8 | Bardi Blaise | Trans Siberian Express (3:40) / Competition Side | 7" | 1980 | B-side instrumental of A-side |
| DIN-9 | Martha and the Muffins | Echo Beach (3:38) / Teddy The Dink (3:32) | 7" | 1980-01 | |
| DIN-10 | Dedringer | Sunday Drivers (3:22) / We Don't Mind (3:23) | 7" | 1980-01 | |
| DIN-11 | Dedringer | Maxine / Innocent 'Til Proven Guilty // Took A Long Time / We Don't Mind (Re-recorded Version) | 2×7" | 1981 | |
| DIN-12 | Dedringer | Direct Line / She's Not Ready | 7" | 1981 | |
| DIN-13 | Laura Warman | Impossible To Love You (3:30) / Pick Up The Pieces (3:25) | 7" | 1981 | |
| DIN-14 | The Name | Forget Art Let's Dance (2:46) / Misfits | 7" | 1980 | |
| DIN-15 | Orchestral Manoeuvres in the Dark | Messages (4:01) / Taking Sides Again (4:20) | 7" | 1980-05-02 | Rerecorded from album version |
| DIN-15-10 | Orchestral Manoeuvres in the Dark | Messages (4:48) // Waiting For The Man / Taking Sides Again | 10" | 1980-05-02 | Multiple coloured labels. Very 1st 10" release with Album version, but withdrawn from sale over band objections. 2nd release with re-recorded Version |
| DIN-Z-16 | The Revillos | Scuba Scuba / Scuba Boy Bop | 7" | 1980 | |
| DIN-17 | Martha and the Muffins | Saigon (3:52) / Copacabana | 7" | 1980-05 | |
| DIN-18 | The Monochrome Set | The Strange Boutique (2:40) / Surfing S.W.12 (2:39) | 7" | 1980 | |
| DIN-19 | Martha and the Muffins | About Insomnia (3:10) / 1 4 6 (4:46) | 7" | 1980-07 | |
| DIN-Z-20 | The Revillos | Hungry For Love / Voodoo 2 | 7" | 1980-08 | |
| DIN-21 | Martha and the Muffins | Suburban Dream / Girl Fat | 7" | 1980-08 | |
| DIN-22 | Orchestral Manoeuvres in the Dark | Enola Gay (3:36) / Annex (4:32) | 7", 12" | 1980-09-26 | 7", 12" identical tracks |
| DIN-23 | The Monochrome Set | 405 Lines (3:00) / Goodbye Joe (2:42) | 7" | 1980 | |
| DIN-24 | Orchestral Manoeuvres in the Dark | Souvenir (3:37) // Motion & Heart (Amazon Version) (3:07) / Sacred Heart (3:27) | 7" | 1981-08-04 | |
| DIN-24-10 | Orchestral Manoeuvres in the Dark | Extended Souvenir // Motion & Heart (Amazon Version) / Sacred Heart | 10" | 1981-08-04 | |
| DIN-25 | Carolynne Beale | Lack Of Money (2:49) / Stuck On A Sad Pill (3:08) | 7" | 1981 | |
| DIN-26 | The Monochrome Set | Apocalypso (3:37) / Fiasco Bongo (3:47) | 7" | 1980-10-03 | |
| DIN-27 | Martha and the Muffins | Was Ezo / Trance And Dance | 7" | 1980-11 | |
| DIN-28 | Nash the Slash | Dead Man's Curve / Reactor No.2 | 7" | 1981 | |
| DIN-29 | Nash the Slash | 19th Nervous Breakdown (3:28) / Danger Zone (4:14) | 7" | 1981 | |
| DIN-30 | Modern Eon | Euthenics / Cardinal Signs | 7" | 1981 | |
| DIN-31 | Modern Eon | Child's Play / Visionary | 7" | 1981 | |
| DIN-32 | Martha Ladly & Scenery Club | Finlandia (3:50) / Tasmania (2:59) | 7" | 1981-06 | |
| DIN-33 | Nash the Slash | Novel Romance (3:18) / In A Glass Eye (4:38) | 7" | 1981 | |
| DIN-34 | Martha and the Muffins | Women Around The World At Work (3:59) / Twenty Two In Cincinnati (4:16) | 7" | 1981-08 | |
| DIN-35 | Modern Eon | Mechanic (3:13) / Splash! (5:09) | 7" | 1981 | |
| DIN-36 | Orchestral Manoeuvres in the Dark | Joan Of Arc (3:46) / The Romance Of The Telescope (Unfinished) (3:17) | 7", 12" | 1981-10-09 | 7", 12" identical tracks. First 1000 12" in textured sleeve. |
| DIN-37 | Hot Gossip | Criminal World / On The Road | 7", 12" | 1982-02 | 12" extended A-side 7:45 |
| DIN-38 | Hot Gossip | Soul Warfare / Soul Warfare (Instrumental) | 7", 12" | 1982-02 | |
| DIN-39 | Arlene Phillips' Hot Gossip | I Don't Depend on You / Depend On Us | 7", 12" | 1982 | |
| DIN-40 | Orchestral Manoeuvres in the Dark | Maid of Orleans (The Waltz Joan of Arc) (4:09) / Navigation (3:26) | 7" | 1982-01-15 | |
| DIN-40-12 | Orchestral Manoeuvres in the Dark | Maid Of Orleans (The Waltz Joan Of Arc) (4:09) // Of All The Things We've Made (3:31) / Navigation (3:26) | 12" | 1982-01-15 | |
| DEP-1 | Martha and the Muffins | 1980 Tour Live EP (Indecision / Cheesies And Gum // Primal Weekend / Paint By Number Heart) | 7"EP | 1980-09 | |
| DEP-2 | Orchestral Manoeuvres in the Dark | The Unreleased '78 Tapes (Introducing Radios / Distance Fades Between Us // Progress / Once When I Was Six) | 7"EP | 1980-10 | Bonus EP with DID-6 Organisation |

== See also ==
- List of record labels

== Sources ==
- Nice, James (2011) [2010]. Shadowplayers: The Rise and Fall of Factory Records (paperback ed.). London: Aurum Press. ISBN 978-1-84513-634-5.
