= The Id (band) =

UK musical group

- Origin: Merseyside, England
- Genres: Synth-pop, post-punk, new wave
- Years active: 1977–1978
- Past members: Andy McCluskey; Julia Kneale; Neill Shenton; John Floyd; Malcolm Holmes; Steve Hollas; Gary Hodgson; Paul Humphreys

The Id were an English new wave/synth-pop band from the Wirral, Merseyside, England, formed in 1977. They are best recalled as the precursor to the band Orchestral Manoeuvres in the Dark (OMD), in which Id members Andy McCluskey (vocals), Paul Humphreys (keyboards) and Malcolm Holmes (drums) would reunite. Gary Hodgson (guitar) would also reappear as a keyboard technician.

DJ and journalist John Peel noted OMD as an "evolved" incarnation of the Id; the group went on to re-record a number of Id songs, including "Electricity".

== Formation ==
The Id formed in September 1977. McCluskey and Humphreys had met each other at school, sharing interests in early electronic artists like Brian Eno and Kraftwerk and played together since 1975. Humphreys went to study electronics at Riversdale College, in Liverpool, where he met Gary Hodgson and Steve Hollas (bass).

The group also included Julia Kneale (vocals), Neill Shenton (guitar) and John Floyd (vocals), all of whom had short-lived tenures. The band gigged regularly in the Merseyside area, performing original material largely written by McCluskey and Humphreys.

== Recordings ==
In early 1978 The Id recorded "Electricity", "Julia's Song" (lyrics by Julia Kneale) and "The Misunderstanding" at the Open Eye studio in Liverpool, following advice from Eric's Club owner Roger Eagle. "Julia's Song" was included on the following year's compilation release, Street to Street: A Liverpool Album, issued by Open Eye Records. By the time of this compilation's release, The Id had already split up; the LP liner notes by John Peel state that The Id was no longer extant, having "evolved" into Orchestral Manoeuvres in the Dark.

The Id split up in August 1978. McCluskey joined Dalek I Love You the same month, but left within a month to reunite with Humphreys to form OMD.

In December 2002, all three tracks recorded by The Id were released as an EP by Engine Records.

=== OMD versions ===
A new recording of "Electricity" was released as OMD's first single on Factory in 1979. It was again re-recorded by the band for their eponymous debut album, released in February 1980, and re-released as a single. It remains one of the group's best known songs.

A new recording of "Julia's Song" also featured on the album, with Malcolm Holmes contributing percussion. He reunited with McCluskey and Humphreys in 1980 for touring and promotional work for the album (together with Dave Hughes also formerly of Dalek I Love You), and for recording the group's second album Organisation, also featuring a radical re-recording of Id track "The Misunderstanding". Holmes then became a permanent member of OMD.

"Julia's Song" was also recorded for OMD's debut Peel session in August 1979 and "The Misunderstanding", similar to the Organisation version, was recorded for their third session for the DJ in September 1980.

Another song by The Id, "Radio Waves", was recorded by OMD for their 1983 album Dazzle Ships. The track had been co-written by John Floyd.

"Julia's Song" received a further radical re-recording, featuring a brass section, in 1984, when it featured as the B-side to OMD's hit single "Talking Loud & Clear".

Gary Hodgson worked as a keyboard technician for OMD during their live performances and has provided similar services for Oasis.

== Discography ==
=== EP ===
==== The Id (2002) UK: Engine Records / ENG 001 ====
No.	Title	Writer(s)	Length
1.	"Electricity"	Andy McCluskey, Paul Humphreys	4:15
2.	"Julia's Song"	music: McCluskey, Humphreys, lyrics: Julia Kneale	4:04
3.	"The Misunderstanding"	McCluskey, Humphreys	2:25

Personnel

- Andy McCluskey - vocals
- Gary Hodgson - guitar
- Paul Humphreys - keyboards
- Steve Hollas - bass
- Mal Holmes - drums

=== Compilation appearance ===
- Street to Street: A Liverpool Album (1979)
