= Peel Sessions 1979–1983 =

Live album by Orchestral Manoeuvres in the Dark
- Released: 24 April 2000
- Recorded: 20 August 1979, 14 April 1980, 29 September 1980, and 29 January 1983 at Maida Vale 4 studio
- Genres: Electronica; synth-pop
- Length: 50:10
- Label: Virgin
- Producers: Orchestral Manoeuvres in the Dark; Tony Wilson; Dale Griffin

Orchestral Manoeuvres in the Dark chronology
The OMD Singles (1998)	Peel Sessions 1979–1983 (2000)	Navigation: The OMD B-Sides (2001)

Peel Sessions 1979–1983 is a compilation album by the English electronic band Orchestral Manoeuvres in the Dark (OMD), released on 24 April 2000. The songs were recorded between 1979 and 1983 for the BBC Radio 1 show presented by John Peel. "Electricity" is added as a bonus track and is the original version that was featured on their debut single on Factory Records (FAC6). "Bunker Soldiers" was recorded for the first and fourth sessions; the version from the fourth session was not originally released on this album. A special vinyl edition released for Record Store Day in 2025 included the missing version of Bunker Soldiers, omitting "Electricity".

== Reception ==
Professional ratings
Review scores
Source	Rating
AllMusic	4/5 stars

Aaron Badgley of AllMusic wrote, "The CD is well recorded, and the playing is tight and exciting. Andy McCluskey and Paul Humphreys have never sounded so good and so alive and energetic on any of the studio releases. Highly recommended." Badgley asserted that the original 7" version of "Electricity" is itself "worth the price of the CD". Trouser Press called the album "a must-have for fans". In The Morning News, Andrew Womack said, "OMD is not just about 'If You Leave'. And this compilation of Peel Sessions from 1979 to 1983 highlights their songwriting ability, focus, and technique by stripping all the songs to their essentials."

== Track listing ==
All tracks are written by Andy McCluskey and Paul Humphreys, except where noted.

No.	Title	Writer(s)	Length
1.	"Bunker Soldiers"		2:49
2.	"Julia's Song"	McCluskey, Humphreys, Julia Kneale	3:56
3.	"Messages"		4:11
4.	"Red Frame/White Light"		3:22
5.	"Pretending to See the Future" (misspelled as "Pretending to See the Light" on the CD and inner booklet)		3:08
6.	"Enola Gay"	McCluskey	3:03
7.	"Dancing"		3:10
8.	"Motion and Heart"		3:44
9.	"Annex"		3:06
10.	"The Misunderstanding"		2:37
11.	"The More I See You"	Harry Warren, Mack Gordon	3:37
12.	"Genetic Engineering"		3:47
13.	"Of All the Things We've Made"		3:24
14.	"ABC Auto Industry"		2:31
15.	"Electricity" (Bonus track, Factory FAC6 version)		3:45

== The Peel sessions ==
All the Peel sessions by OMD were recorded at Maida Vale 4 studio.

=== First Peel session ===
The first Peel session was recorded on 20 August 1979 and transmitted on 3 September 1979.

Track list:

1. "Bunker Soldiers"
2. "Julia's Song"
3. "Messages"
4. "Red Frame/White Light"

Producer: Tony Wilson, engineer: Dave Dade.

Line up:

- Andy McCluskey (bass, vocals, drum machine)
- Paul Humphreys (keyboards, vocals)

=== Second Peel session ===
The second Peel session was recorded on 14 April 1980 and transmitted on 21 April 1980.

Track list:

1. "Pretending to See the Future"
2. "Enola Gay"
3. "Dancing"
4. "Motion and Heart"

Producer: Tony Wilson, engineer: Dave Dade.

Line up:

- Andy McCluskey: bass, vocals, drum machine
- Paul Humphreys: keyboards, vocals
- David Hughes: keyboards
- Malcolm Holmes: drums

=== Third Peel session ===
The third Peel session was recorded on 29 September 1980 and transmitted on 6 October 1980.

Track list:

1. "Annex"
2. "The Misunderstanding"
3. "The More I See You"

Producer: Tony Wilson, engineer: Dave Dade.

Line up:

- Andy McCluskey: bass, vocals, drum machine
- Paul Humphreys: keyboards, vocals
- Martin Cooper: synthesizer (on "The Misunderstanding" only)
- Malcolm Holmes: drums

=== Fourth Peel session ===
The fourth Peel session was recorded on 29 January 1983 and transmitted on 21 February 1983.

Track list:

1. "Genetic Engineering"
2. "Of All the Things We've Made"
3. "ABC Auto Industry"
4. "Bunker Soldiers"

Producer: Dale Griffin, engineers: Harry Parker and Martin Colley.

Line up:

- Andy McCluskey: bass, vocals, drum machine
- Paul Humphreys: keyboards, vocals
- Martin Cooper: synthesizer
- Malcolm Holmes: drums
