= Red Frame/White Light =

Single by Orchestral Manoeuvres in the Dark

from the album Orchestral Manoeuvres in the Dark
- B-side: "I Betray My Friends"
- Released: 1 February 1980
- Recorded: 1979
- Studio: The Gramophone Suite (Liverpool)
- Genre: Synth-pop; electropop
- Length: 3:15
- Label: Dindisc
- Songwriters: Paul Humphreys; Andy McCluskey
- Producers: Orchestral Manoeuvres in the Dark; Chester Valentino

Orchestral Manoeuvres in the Dark singles chronology
"Electricity" (1979)	"Red Frame/White Light" (1980)	"Messages" (1980)

Music video
- "Red Frame/White Light" on YouTube

"Red Frame/White Light" is the second single by the English electronic band Orchestral Manoeuvres in the Dark (OMD). The song is about a red telephone box in Meols, on the North West England in North West England, that was used by the band to make calls to organise their gigs in the late 1970s. The track is composed of two alternating major/minor sections, each built around a synthesiser hook. Lyrical content is minimal, comprising mostly brief, spoken word utterances. It was the band's first single to chart.

The song had previously never been included in any of the band's compilation albums (except for the music video being included on the DVD of Messages: Greatest Hits in 2008) until 2019, when it appeared as part of Souvenir – The Singles 1979–2019.

== Critical reception ==
Simon Ludgate of Record Mirror described the song as "a fab record to dance to" and "irresistibly catchy". Melody Maker called it "synth-pop of the new sensibility, which incorporates humour, emotion and a healthy awareness of disposability." Other appraisals were mixed, making unfavourable comparisons to new wave musician Gary Numan, or suggesting that it was not the best album track to be chosen as a single.

Retrospectively, AllMusic critic Ned Raggett praised the song's "mysterious chimes and spy-movie dramatics", while Andy Page of God Is in the TV described the track as an "early synthpop classic". The Human League's frontman Philip Oakey named "Red Frame/White Light" as a "personal favourite" of the band's discography, which cemented his fandom of OMD.

== Track listing ==
1. "Red Frame/White Light" – 3:15
2. "I Betray My Friends" – 3:50

== Sleeve design ==
The sleeve was designed by Ben Kelly and Peter Saville.

== Telephone box ==
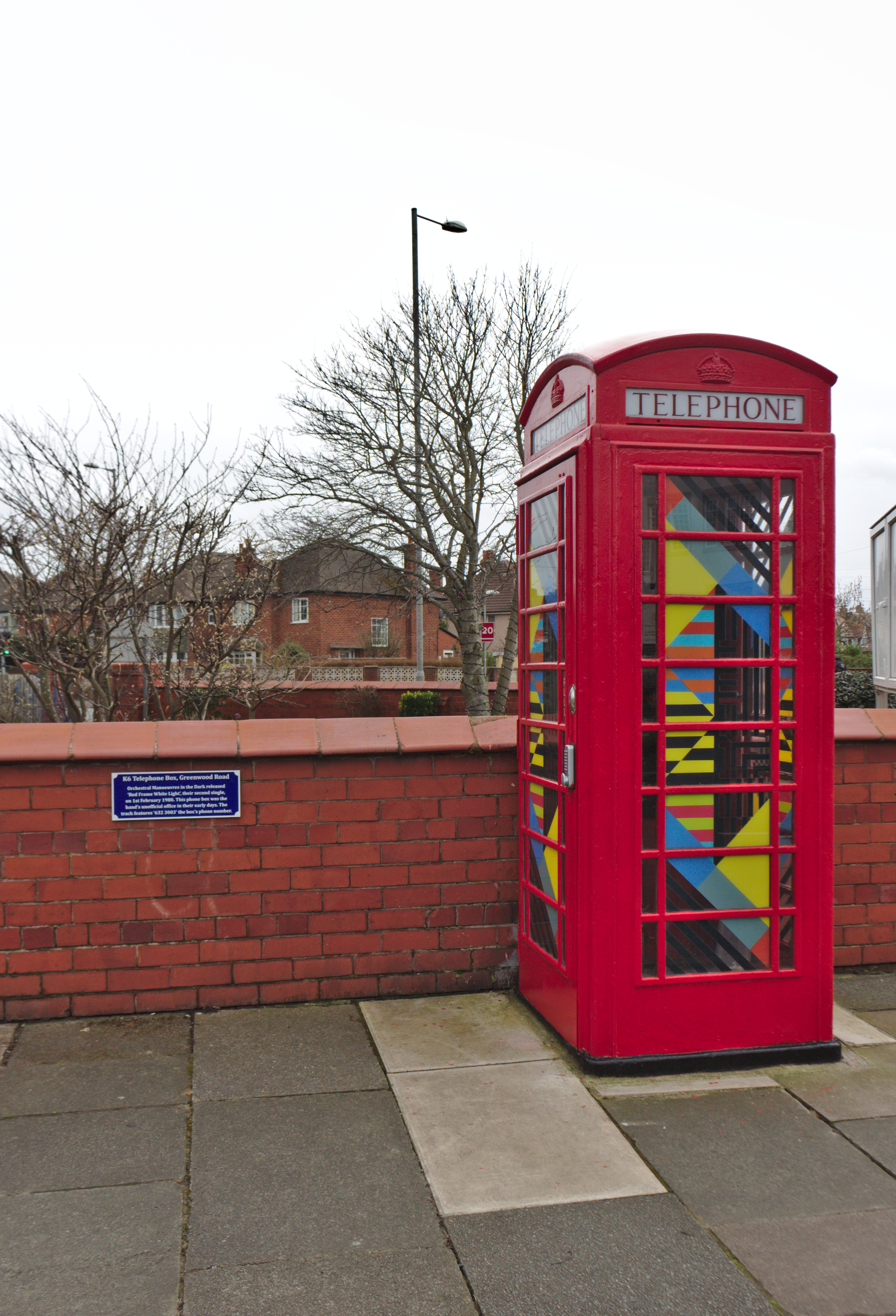
The red telephone box with commemorative plaque added in 2019 (53.401006°N 3.158353°W)

The red telephone box that inspired "Red Frame/White Light" is located at the junction of Birkenhead Road and Greenwood Road in Meols.

In the nearby pub, The Railway Inn, the band would meet and used the telephone box to organise their gigs and transportation. In the song's lyrics the phone number is mentioned: 6323003.

Fans would ring the number expecting to contact one of the band members, but got a confused home owner in their own area code. Over the years it has become a kind of sacred place for OMD fans. In 2004 OMD fan Stephen Cork started a successful campaign to get the telephone box repainted in time for a fan tour on 10 April 2005.

On the evening of 18 August 2017 the phone box was removed by BT Group. It has subsequently been restored and returned to its original location as of October 2017.

== Music video ==
Australian director Russell Mulcahy shot the music video. It was believed to have been lost as it was not part of Virgin Records' video archive. Keyboardist Paul Humphreys sourced a copy which led to its inclusion on the DVD component of Messages: Greatest Hits (2008). The Roland CR-78 drum machine, which was used on the intro of the song, is visible in the clip.

== Charts ==
"Red Frame/White Light" was the group's first entry on the UK singles chart, reaching number 67 in February 1980.

Chart (1980)	Peak position
UK Singles (Official Charts)	67
US Dance Club Songs (Billboard) with "Messages"	67

== Alternative versions ==
Contrary to identical timings being printed on the 7" and 12" labels, the 12" version is slightly longer as the coda comes to a sudden stop, as opposed to the 7" version which fades out.

The group recorded a version of "Red Frame/White Light" for a John Peel radio session in 1979. This version was made available on the compilation album Peel Sessions 1979–1983 (2000).

A remastered version appeared on the 2019 compilation album and boxset, Souvenir – The Singles 1979–2019.

== Live performances ==
After being included in many early live sets, the song has rarely been performed live by the band after 1980.

A live performance was recorded at the Theatre Royal, Nottingham on 28 July 1980 for Rockstage TV broadcast. It was not given official release until 2015 on the Access All Areas CD and DVD release.

In 2019, the band performed the song as an encore on their 40th anniversary Souvenir Tour.
