= Universal (Orchestral Manoeuvres in the Dark song) =

Single by Orchestral Manoeuvres in the Dark

from the album Universal
- Released: 21 October 1996
- Recorded: The Townhouse, London
- Genre: Synth-pop
- Length: 5:41 (album version); 3:32 (single edit)
- Label: Virgin Records
- Songwriter: Andy McCluskey
- Producers: Andy McCluskey, Matthew Vaughan, David Nicholas

Orchestral Manoeuvres in the Dark singles chronology
"Walking on the Milky Way" (1996)	"Universal" (1996)	"If You Want It" (2010)

Music video
- "Orchestral Manoeuvres In The Dark - Universal" on YouTube

"Universal" is a song by the English electronic band Orchestral Manoeuvres in the Dark (OMD), released as the second and last single from their album Universal.

The single peaked at number 50 on the UK Singles Chart. This version differs from the original, adding the female singers to the beginning and editing out the lengthy introduction of the album version. It was edited by Pete Lewis. Like the previous single "Walking on the Milky Way", it was released on CD and cassette formats but not on 7" or 12" vinyl.

"Universal" would remain OMD's final single for over a decade until the band's reunion.

== Reception ==
Music Week scored the single 5/5, writing, "Once again Andy McCluskey displays his immense talent for writing perfect pop songs on this epic track that stands out on a very strong album."

== Track listing ==
=== 5" CD single 1 ===
VSCDT 1606

1. "Universal" (single edit) – 3:32
2. "Heaven Is (live)" – 4:49
3. "Messages (live)" – 4:34
4. "Universal (album version)" – 5:40

=== 5" CD single 2 ===
VSCDG 1606

1. "Universal"
2. "King of Stone (live)"
3. "Talking Loud and Clear (live)"
4. "Universal (album version)"

The live tracks were recorded at Birmingham NEC in December 1993 for transmission on the BBC on 7 December 1993.

== Charts ==
Chart (1996)	Peak Position
UK Singles Chart	50
