= Maid of Orleans (The Waltz Joan of Arc) =

Single by Orchestral Manoeuvres in the Dark

from the album Architecture & Morality
- B-side: "Navigation"; "Of All the Things We've Made"
- Released: 15 January 1982
- Recorded: The Manor, Shipton-on-Cherwell, Oxfordshire, England
- Genre: Synth-pop
- Length: 4:09
- Label: Dindisc
- Songwriter: Andy McCluskey
- Producers: OMD and Richard Manwaring

Orchestral Manoeuvres in the Dark singles chronology
"Joan of Arc" (1981)	"Maid of Orleans (The Waltz Joan of Arc)" (1982)	"She's Leaving" (1982)

Music video
- "Orchestral Manoeuvres In The Dark - Maid Of Orleans" on YouTube

"Joan of Arc (Maid of Orleans)" is a song by the English electronic band Orchestral Manoeuvres in the Dark (OMD), released in 1982 as the third single from their third studio album, Architecture & Morality. To prevent confusion with the group's previous single "Joan of Arc", the song was retitled "Maid of Orleans (The Waltz Joan of Arc)" for its single release. Both songs are about the French heroine Joan of Arc and both reached the Top 5 of the UK Singles Chart—although this release was more successful internationally, topping the charts in several countries including Germany, where it was the biggest-selling single of 1982. "Maid of Orleans" has sold four million copies worldwide.

The single was the last release on the Dindisc label.

== Background ==
"Maid of Orleans" had originally been written by Andy McCluskey on 30 May 1981, the 550th anniversary of Joan of Arc's death. The track has been described by McCluskey as OMD's "Mull of Kintyre". It is in 6/8 time, and the main theme is played on the Mellotron (using its "3-Violins" sound). The intro is made of strange noises and was added later:

The intro was a problem for radio and we did do edited versions where it was shortened.

The idea came about because we actually had the song recorded but thought the track started oddly and needed something else to announce its arrival. At the time of A+M we were making a lot of music that was ambient soundscapes. The natural thing was to give the song an intro that set up the feel for the main themes to resolve out of the noises.

It's not meant to "mean" anything specific, just set up a feeling to let the track grow out of the strange noises. I think that it worked well!

BTW.. for the sound anoraks...most of the noises are melotron [sic] vocal sounds slowed down/sped up and greatly distorted simply by completely overdriving the old Helios desk in The Manor Studio. Pink noise and snare drum in lots of reverb.

== Reception and legacy ==
Jim Cusack of the Belfast Telegraph wrote, "This could be the big single of the early part of 1982. OMD sound their very best on this track and the melody will haunt you for years." Smash Hits journalist Ian Birch said, "Once again the dreamboat duo come up with a scintillating intro before settling into a stately canter which becomes more hypnotic with each listen. It could easily be their 'Mull of Kintyre'." James Belsey of the Bristol Evening Post observed a "moody, melodic study", naming it his "Single of the Week". "Maid of Orleans" became Germany's biggest-selling single of 1982, as well as the 33rd-biggest seller in the UK that year. The single has sold four million copies worldwide.

Ned Raggett of AllMusic retrospectively described the song as "epic", concluding, "With another bravura [Andy] McCluskey lead and a mock-bagpipe lead that's easily more entrancing than the real thing, it's a wrenching ballad like no other before it and little since." Music critic Garry Bushell hailed the track as "pop genius". "Maid of Orleans" was named by Record Mirror's John Shearlaw and Daniela Soave as one of the top three singles of 1982; Radio X included it in "The 25 Best Indie Songs of 1982".

"Maid of Orleans" placed 18th in Classic Pop's "Top 100 Singles of the 80s", the magazine asserting, "As soon as you hear this you remember greatness." The Deutsches Museum featured the track in their article, "Best of the 1980s—The Masterpieces of Synth Pop", noting its "unmistakable, almost bagpipe-like" mellotron hook. In 1989, Veronica listeners voted the song as the 60th-best in history.

"Maid of Orleans" was recorded by London's Royal Philharmonic Orchestra in 1996. The Fades frontman Dave Lightfoot selected the track as part of the Joyzine series, "My Life in 10 Songs". "Maid of Orleans" was used during the climax and closing credits to the final episode of the second series of BBC television drama Ashes to Ashes.

== B-sides ==
The songs on the B-sides are "Navigation" and "Of All the Things We've Made" (12" and CD single only). Both songs can be found as bonus tracks on the remastered versions of Architecture & Morality. "Of All the Things We've Made" was added to their next album Dazzle Ships, released in 1983. "Navigation" was the title track for the 2001 B-sides compilation album Navigation: The OMD B-Sides. The early 12" single sleeves list the track "Experiments in Vertical Take Off", but this song was never written.

== Track listings ==
=== 7" vinyl single ===
- UK: DinDisc DIN 40

Side one

1. "Maid of Orleans (The Waltz Joan of Arc)" (Andy McCluskey) – 4:09

Side two

1. "Navigation" (Paul Humphreys/McCluskey) – 3:26

=== 12" vinyl single ===
- UK: DinDisc DIN 40-12

Side one

1. "Maid of Orleans (The Waltz Joan of Arc)" – 4:09

Side two

1. "Of All the Things We've Made" (Humphreys/McCluskey) – 3:31
2. "Navigation" – 3:26

Two different sleeve designs were issued, firstly a silver coin design, and a stained-glass design (similar to the 7" picture sleeve) with three different variations.

=== 3" Mini CD single ===
- Virgin CDT27 released 5 December 1988
1. "Maid of Orleans (The Waltz Joan of Arc)" (12" version) – 4:13
2. "Joan of Arc" (12" version) (McCluskey) – 3:51
3. "Navigation" – 3:30
4. "Of All the Things We've Made" – 3:27

The sleeve erroneously states that there are 12" versions of "Maid of Orleans" and "Joan of Arc" on the CD single (these are the same as the 7" versions).

== Promotional video ==
For the promotional video, the outdoor shots were made at Brimham Rocks and Fountains Abbey near Aldfield, North Yorkshire in January 1982 during an unusually colder winter and the indoor shots at The Manor Studio in Oxfordshire. The video was directed by Steve Barron and featured Julia Tobin, an actress from the Royal Shakespeare Company as Joan of Arc. The promo video is included on the video version of The Best of OMD and on the bonus DVD of the 2007 reissue of Architecture & Morality.

In 1991, MTV Europe named the video as the 37th best ever made.

== Charts ==
=== Weekly charts ===
Chart (1982)	Peak position
Australia (Kent Music Report)	78
Austria (Ö3 Austria Top 40)	2
Belgium (Ultratop 50 Flanders)	1
Ireland (IRMA)	5
Netherlands (Dutch Top 40)	1
Netherlands (Single Top 100)	1
New Zealand (Recorded Music NZ)	7
South Africa (Springbok Radio)	19
Spain (AFYVE)	1
Switzerland (Schweizer Hitparade)	4
UK Singles (Official Charts)	4
West Germany (GfK)	1

=== Year-end charts ===
Chart (1982)	Position
Austria (Ö3 Austria Top 40)	6
Belgium (Ultratop 50 Flanders)	5
Netherlands (Dutch Top 40)	3
Netherlands (Single Top 100)	3
Switzerland (Schweizer Hitparade)	6
UK Singles (OCC)	33
West Germany (Media Control)	1

== Certifications ==
Region	Certification	Certified units/sales
Germany (BVMI)	Gold	500,000^{^}
Netherlands (NVPI)	Gold	100,000^{^}
United Kingdom (BPI)	Silver	250,000^{^}
^{^} Shipments figures based on certification alone.

== Sleeves ==
The cover was designed by Peter Saville, Carol Wilson and Brett Wickens and was inspired by a stained glass design by Anton Wolff.

There is more than one sleeve design for the 12" version. The original sleeve design featured an embossed coin motif on a silver foil. It was only released for a limited time, because the band didn't like this design. It was replaced with a similar stained glass sleeve as the 7" version in several variations.

== Alternative versions ==
There is only one studio recording of the song, identical for both the album and single releases. A remix entitled Maid of Orleans (Afterhours Mix) by Mulu was released on the remix disc which accompanied the French edition of The OMD Singles compilation album in 2003.

== Live performances ==
The song has been performed at live shows on a regular basis since the Architecture & Morality tour in 1981. A live performance from 1981 was filmed for the Live at The Theatre Royal, Drury Lane concert in December 1981, initially released on VHS (1982) and laserdisc (1984) and later on DVD

Maid of Orleans was chosen as one of the songs to be performed with an orchestra for the Night of the Proms concert tour in December 2006, effectively McCluskey and Humphreys' first live performances together since the pair had split in 1988. The performances of Maid of Orleans and Sailing on the Seven Seas were issued on CD.

Live recordings have been made available on the Walking on the Milky Way CD single (1996), the Architecture & Morality & More album (2008), Dazzle Ships at The Museum of Liverpool CD/DVD (2015) and on Architecture & Morality / Dazzle Ships – Live at the Royal Albert Hall (2016). The song was also performed with The Royal Liverpool Philharmonic Orchestra in June 2009 as documented by the Electricity DVD release.
