= Universal (Orchestral Manoeuvres in the Dark album) =

Studio album by Orchestral Manoeuvres in the Dark
- Released: 2 September 1996
- Studios: The Factory (Dublin); JE Sound (Los Angeles); Townhouse (London); Metropolis, London
- Genres: Synth-pop, pop rock
- Length: 49:40
- Label: Virgin
- Producers: Andy McCluskey; Matthew Vaughan; David Nicholas

Orchestral Manoeuvres in the Dark chronology
Liberator (1993)	Universal (1996)	The OMD Singles (1998)

Singles from Universal
- 1. "Walking on the Milky Way" Released: 5 August 1996; 2. "Universal" Released: 21 October 1996

Universal is the tenth studio album by the English electronic band Orchestral Manoeuvres in the Dark (OMD), released on 2 September 1996 by Virgin Records. Frontman Andy McCluskey opted for a more organic, acoustic sound on the record, which peaked at number 24 on the UK Albums Chart. It was generally well received by music critics, although the British media's overall resistance to OMD – who had been rendered unfashionable by the prevalence of grunge and indie rock – prompted McCluskey to dissolve the group. Universal was their last album until 2010's History of Modern.

The album spawned the singles "Walking on the Milky Way" (a number 17 hit in the UK) and "Universal".

== Background ==
McCluskey opted for a more organic sound on Universal, while looking to capture an "epic" feel. He explained, "I'd abandoned techno/house; it was like an old man dying his hair jet-black: ridiculous. I decided to follow the current trend of getting more acoustic, using real drums and bass." McCluskey had been writing with former Kraftwerk member Karl Bartos, who had also become interested in more organic music. Bartos is credited as a co-writer on "The Moon & the Sun". McCluskey described "The Boy from the Chemist Is Here to See You" as "late OMD, doing late Pulp, doing early Roxy Music" (co-producers Matthew Vaughan and David Nicholas had worked on Pulp's 1995 album, Different Class).

OMD co-founder Paul Humphreys, who had departed the group in 1989, served as co-writer on "Very Close to Far Away" and "If You're Still in Love with Me". The former marked Humphreys' first songwriting collaboration with McCluskey since leaving the band; the latter dated to 1987 and had originally been envisioned as a reggae song. Anne Dudley of Art of Noise arranged "If You're Still in Love with Me" for a 12-piece string section. The album features various session musicians, including Phil Spalding, Chuck Sabo and Carol Kenyon.

McCluskey rented a house in Dublin, and worked within the city at The Factory studio. He also recorded at Townhouse and Metropolis in London, as well as JE Sound in Los Angeles.

Alternative titles for the album were Very Close to Far Away and That Was Then, This Is Now. The cover artwork was designed by Area, based on a concept by Peter Saville.

== Reception ==
Professional ratings
Review scores
Source	Rating
AllMusic	2/5 stars
Chester Chronicle	9/10
Classic Pop	3/5 stars
Encyclopedia of Eighties Music	3/5 stars
Music Week	5/5 stars
NME	5/10
Q	4/5 stars
Shields Gazette	8/10
The Sydney Morning Herald	3/5 stars
Tunbridge Wells Courier	4/5 stars

Universal met with generally favourable reviews. Music Week gave the record a full five stars and named it their "Album of the Week", writing, "Packed with hits, drunk on pomp, Andy McCluskey has never sounded or written better and the production is a joy." Debbi Voller of Q described the record as "more ethereal than electronic", adding, "Lyrically, this is a collection of songs about lost youth, doomed love and broken dreams – and yet the music is wonderfully uplifting... McCluskey is still a master of melody." NME's Simon Williams noted that Universal finds McCluskey "in reassuringly romping mode", the music "crispy clear, serenely syrupy, occasionally spiritual, frequently lovelorn, cosmically old-fashioned and extremely expensive-sounding". He concluded that "nothing else is anywhere near as slinky as '...Milky Way', but OMD should take heart: they're still miles better than Tears for Sodding Fears."

Retrospectively, Classic Pop critic Mark Lindores declared the album a "return to form" that is "littered with gems". He drew comparisons to the Police, China Crisis and Different Class-era Pulp, but asserted that Universal is "still unmistakeably an OMD record and many of the highlights capture their own former glories." Lindores' colleague Wyndham Wallace felt the album "ha[s] its moments" but includes some jarring departures in sound, such as baggy and spiritual elements. In The Rough Guide to Rock (1999), co-author Dave Castle noted "a return to the more comfortable floaty moods of OMD's heyday, with melody and atmosphere triumphing over raw electronica." AllMusic editor Stephen Thomas Erlewine was unenthused, observing "only a fraction of the sophisticated craft that made... predecessor Liberator enjoyable, and none of the adventurous spirit of [OMD's] '80s records."

By 1996 the British media was reluctant to promote OMD, who had been rendered unfashionable by the prevalence of grunge and indie rock. McCluskey, therefore, elected to dissolve the group. He later said, "I could have gone techno, I could have gone hip-hop – nothing I could have done would have actually made Universal sell more." Original OMD keyboardist Paul Humphreys, who did not play on Universal, regarded it as a "really, really good record".

== Track listing ==
All tracks are written by Andy McCluskey, except where noted.

No.	Title	Writer(s)	Length
1.	"Universal"		5:41
2.	"Walking on the Milky Way"	McCluskey, Nigel Ipinson, Keith Small	4:38
3.	"The Moon & the Sun"	McCluskey, Karl Bartos	3:37
4.	"The Black Sea"	McCluskey, Stuart Kershaw	3:38
5.	"Very Close to Far Away"	Paul Humphreys, McCluskey	5:45
6.	"The Gospel of St Jude"		2:23
7.	"That Was Then"		4:27
8.	"Too Late"	McCluskey, Kershaw	4:09
9.	"The Boy from the Chemist Is Here to See You"		4:41
10.	"If You're Still in Love with Me"	Humphreys, McCluskey, Kershaw	2:51
11.	"New Head"	McCluskey, Simon Fung	5:01
12.	"Victory Waltz"		2:45

== Personnel ==
- Andy McCluskey – vocals, keyboards, production, mix on tracks 8–9
- Matthew Vaughan – keyboards on tracks 1, 4, 8, and 10, guitar on tracks 2, 3, and 5, piano on track 3, bass on track 9, production on tracks 1–7, and tracks 10–12
- Breda Dunne – backing vocals on track 1
- Phil Spalding – bass on tracks 1–3, track 5, and track 7, backing vocals on track 2
- Chuck Sabo – drums and percussion on tracks 1–3, track 5, and tracks 7–9
- Hannah Clive – backing vocals on track 2
- Carol Kenyon – backing vocals on track 5
- Richard Allen Singers – vocals on track 6, courtesy of Smithsonian Folkways Recordings
- Jimmy Taylor – guitar on track 7
- Maggie Keane – backing vocals on track 8
- Anne Dudley – string arrangement for track 10
- David Nicholas – production on tracks 1–7, and tracks 10–12, engineer, mix on tracks 2–10, and 12
- Gregg Jackman – mix on tracks 1, and 11
- Julie Gardner – engineer, assistant engineer
- Neil Tucker – assistant engineer

== Charts ==
Chart (1996)	Peak position
Austrian Albums (Ö3 Austria)	21
European Albums (Music & Media)	45
German Albums (Offizielle Top 100)	39
Scottish Albums (Official Charts)	43
Swedish Albums (Sverigetopplistan)	34
Swiss Albums (Schweizer Hitparade)	28
UK Albums (Official Charts)	24
