= Orchestral Manoeuvres in the Dark (album) =

Studio album by Orchestral Manoeuvres in the Dark
- Released: 22 February 1980
- Recorded: 1979
- Studio: Gramophone Suite (Liverpool)
- Genres: Synth-pop; electropop; new wave; post-punk
- Length: 37:42
- Label: Dindisc
- Producers: Orchestral Manoeuvres in the Dark; Chester Valentino

Orchestral Manoeuvres in the Dark chronology
Orchestral Manoeuvres in the Dark (1980)	Organisation (1980)

Singles from Orchestral Manoeuvres in the Dark
- 1. "Electricity" Released: 21 May 1979; 2. "Red Frame/White Light" Released: 1 February 1980; 3. "Messages" Released: 2 May 1980

Orchestral Manoeuvres in the Dark is the debut studio album by the English electronic band Orchestral Manoeuvres in the Dark (OMD), released on 22 February 1980 by Dindisc. Recorded at the group's Liverpool studio, it showcased their minimal synth-pop style and peaked at number 27 on the UK Albums Chart. "Electricity" and "Red Frame/White Light" were released as singles; a re-recorded version of "Messages" provided OMD with their first hit in the UK, reaching number 13.

Much of the album's content centres around war themes, with OMD exploring "the lengths to which people would go in a situation beyond the norm". A sleeper hit, Orchestral Manoeuvres in the Dark met with favourable reviews and became a seminal record of its era. The band expressed dissatisfaction with their production efforts on the album, although frontman Andy McCluskey later came to appreciate its "naivety". It was remastered and re-released in 2003 with six bonus tracks, including the single version of "Messages".

Orchestral Manoeuvres in the Dark is also the title of a 1981 compilation album of tracks from this release and OMD's second album, Organisation, issued only in the United States.

== Background ==
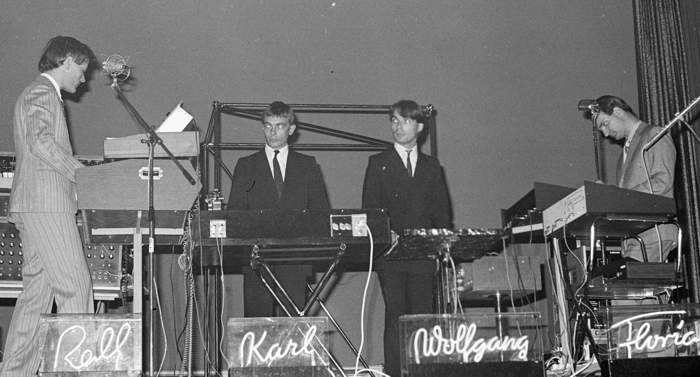
The album was largely influenced by German electronic acts, such as Kraftwerk.

Rather than hire studio time to record the album, OMD co-founders Andy McCluskey and Paul Humphreys used their advance payment from Dindisc to build their own Liverpool recording studio, The Gramophone Suite. The duo predicted they would be dropped by the label due to disappointing sales, but would at least own a studio. McCluskey and Humphreys used cheaply-acquired instruments, as well as the low-end Korg M500 Micro-Preset (which had been paid for in many instalments). Their studio incurred leakage when the lead covering was stolen from its roof, and so McCluskey had to record his vocals under an umbrella.

Dindisc scheduled the album for release in February 1980, allowing three weeks for recording under the supervision of manager Paul Collister. The included tracks were composed during the previous four years: "Electricity" (McCluskey and Humphreys' first ever composition), "Julia's Song" and "The Misunderstanding" were holdovers from OMD precursor outfit the Id. A version of "Electricity" had been issued as OMD's debut single in 1979, and featured an early take of "Almost" as its B-side. McCluskey and Humphreys had to write two final songs, "Pretending to See the Future" and "The Messerschmitt Twins", "off the top of their heads" in order to complete the tracklist. Much of the content centres around war themes; McCluskey noted that the band were exploring "the lengths to which people would go in a situation beyond the norm".

Still generally a duo performing alongside a TEAC 4-track tape recorder christened "Winston", OMD enlisted Martin Cooper and Malcolm Holmes. The latter had performed with McCluskey and Humphreys in the Id (both musicians would become full-time band members the following year). Cooper played saxophone on "Mystereality", while Holmes supplied percussion on "Julia's Song"; Dave Fairbairn played guitar on this track, as well as on "Messages". Kraftwerk, Neu! and Brian Eno served as key musical influences on the album, which showcased OMD's minimal synth-pop style. Biographer Johnny Waller described the finished record as "basically a studio version of their live set".

The group were dissatisfied with the production values of Orchestral Manoeuvres in the Dark, Humphreys stating, "We didn't know what the heck we were doing half the time." McCluskey, however, feels that "in hindsight it now has a naivety and charm, and is full of energy".

== Artwork ==
The Orchestral Manoeuvres in the Dark sleeve was created by graphic designer Peter Saville and interior designer Ben Kelly, based on a door conceived by Kelly. It featured a die-cut grid through which the orange inner sleeve was visible. Saville and Kelly won a Designers and Art Directors Award for their work. McCluskey has praised the artwork, saying in 2019, "To this day, I think half the people bought [the album] for the Peter Saville sleeve."

McCluskey stated that OMD did not fully understand the royalty system at the time, and that the band "had a sleeve that cost us so much to manufacture that for every record we sold we were barely earning pennies". Carol Wilson of Dindisc disputed this, saying the cost to the band for the sleeve was contractually fixed and that the label took the expense.

== Critical reception ==
Professional ratings
Review scores
Source	Rating
All Music Guide to Electronica	4/5 stars
The Big Issue	5/5 stars
Muzik	4/5 stars
Ondarock	8/10
Q	4/5 stars
Record Mirror	4/5 stars
Smash Hits	7½/10
Sounds	4/5 stars
Tom Hull – on the Web	A−
Uncut	8/10

Reviews of Orchestral Manoeuvres in the Dark were favourable. Paul Morley of NME wrote, "Orch Man's debut LP is one of the best of the year... How fine and different their melodies can be, how detailed and distinctive their song structures. It's much more varied and surprising, often exhilarating and always captivating, than dissenters claim this stuff can be." Sounds' Des Moines proclaimed OMD to be "the most inventive of all the new Mersey[side] bands", while noting that they had "pulled off what is traditionally the biggest gamble in rock: playing totally engaging, satisfying music without the facility of the lead guitar". Red Starr of Smash Hits said, "An odd album from an odd duo, sometimes briskly clean synthesiser pop, sometimes strange and intriguing electronic excursions... Buy it and learn to love it."

Orchestral Manoeuvres in the Dark was hailed as a superior record within the contemporary synth-pop movement. In an enthusiastic review for The Face, Adrian Thrills contrasted OMD's "melodic immediacy" to the "nauseatingly self-conscious futuristic android pop of the [Gary] Numan/[John] Foxx automation acolytes", and declared the album to have "far more depth" than the Human League's Reproduction. Simon Ludgate of Record Mirror observed an emotional resonance that he felt was typically absent from synth-pop, while recommending the album for its "insidious rhythm and melody", and imagery that "will change at each play". In The Age, John Teerds viewed the record as "perhaps the best synthesiser-based music to emerge [in 1980]." It became the UK's 60th-best selling album that year.

In a retrospective appraisal, Trouser Press referred to Orchestral Manoeuvres in the Dark as "a demonstration of stylish electro-pop" with "a knack for melodies and hooks". Steve McDonald, in a review for the All Music Guide to Electronica (2001), noted "a very quirky, nervous album of clockwork synth-pop that avoided the lock-step imposed by primitive technology, mainly by dint of Andy McCluskey's twitchy, frantic bass and vocals." Pitchfork's Scott Plagenhoef wrote that the record's "adventurous blend of drama and pathos—and its nods toward the more rhythmic end of Krautrock—elevated [OMD] above the [Brian] Eno/Kraftwerk template clung to by many of their peers." Dave Segal of The Stranger described the album as "a masterpiece of enchanting melodies, fascinating rhythms, and cherubic vocals".

== Legacy ==
Joseph Burnett of The Quietus identified Orchestral Manoeuvres in the Dark as "one of the key early British synth-based pop/rock albums". Herald critic Nicola Meighan called it the first of "four vital, influential albums" from OMD, preceding Organisation (1980), Architecture & Morality (1981) and Dazzle Ships (1983). Orchestral Manoeuvres in the Dark has appeared in recountings of 1980's finest records, as well as in various "Best of the '80s" lists; Classic Pop readers voted the album the 71st-greatest of the decade, and the magazine's editorial staff ranked it 26th in the "Top 40 80s Debut Albums". Orchestral Manoeuvres in the Dark was included in Blow Up's 20 essential synth-pop records of 1979–1983, while 89.3 The Current listeners positioned it at no. 291 in the "893 Essential Debut Albums". Electronic Sound featured the record in their 2015 article, "50 Years of Electronic Sounds", which plots "a course through the world of electronic music in 50 key releases".

Orchestral Manoeuvres in the Dark was a formative influence on electronic group Depeche Mode. Original bandleader Vince Clarke (later of Yazoo and Erasure) cited the album as an all-time favourite, adding, "It was a record that everybody had in my group, and we all played it at parties and danced to it." Moby named the "phenomenal" album as an inspiration, while physicist/musician Brian Cox cited it as a major influence and a personal favourite. The record became the primary inspiration for Darkstar's North (2010). LCD Soundsystem's James Murphy "constantly" listened to Orchestral Manoeuvres in the Dark, and follow-up Organisation, during the making of This Is Happening (2010). Leftfield sampled "Almost" for their track "Snakeblood" (without attribution), which appeared on the soundtrack of The Beach (2000). Acid House Kings recorded a cover version of "Almost" in 2001, while Mahogany covered "Bunker Soldiers".

Musician/producer Lowfish named Orchestral Manoeuvres in the Dark his second-favourite record of all time. New wave band B-Movie listed the album among their 10 favourites, stating, "There was something soulful about the sound that grabbed you. The songs were perfect synth pop but the bass guitar added another dimension." The record was publicly championed by rock group ZZ Top, who purchased and played it over the PA system at concert venues. Orchestral Manoeuvres in the Dark has also received endorsements from Pet Shop Boys vocalist Neil Tennant, No Doubt bassist Tony Kanal, and Spandau Ballet bandleader Gary Kemp, who found it to be "so ahead of its time". U2 singer Bono recalled "[lying] on the bed, staring" at his poster of the album cover in the early 1980s.

== Track listing ==
All songs were written by Andy McCluskey and Paul Humphreys, except where noted.

=== Original release ===
Released on LP and compact cassette, the album was well-balanced for playback time, 18:23 on side A and 18:44 on side B. A 1980 French cassette release, offered as part of Collection Chrome high performance line, is notable for using more expensive chromium dioxide tape instead of the standard ferric oxide tape. This release quotes slightly different running times, 17:36 and 18:23, respectively.

Side one
No.	Title	Length
1.	"Bunker Soldiers"	2:51
2.	"Almost"	3:40
3.	"Mystereality"	2:42
4.	"Electricity"	3:32
5.	"The Messerschmitt Twins"	5:38

Side two
No.	Title	Writer(s)	Length
6.	"Messages"		4:06
7.	"Julia's Song"	McCluskey, Humphreys, Julia Kneale	4:40
8.	"Red Frame/White Light"		3:10
9.	"Dancing" (instrumental)		3:00
10.	"Pretending to See the Future"		3:48

=== US release (O.M.D.) ===
A 1981 US compilation, also using the band's name as the title of the release, collects material from the first two OMD albums, and uses a differently coloured, non-die cut version of the sleeve-art from the debut LP.

Side one
No.	Title	Writer(s)	Length
1.	"Enola Gay"	McCluskey	3:31
2.	"2nd Thought"	McCluskey	4:12
3.	"Bunker Soldiers"		2:51
4.	"Almost"		3:46
5.	"Electricity"		3:32
6.	"Statues"		4:08

Side two
No.	Title	Writer(s)	Length
7.	"The Misunderstanding"		4:45
8.	"Julia's Song"	McCluskey, Humphreys, Julia Kneale	4:32
9.	"Motion and Heart"		3:13
10.	"Messages"		3:59
11.	"Stanlow"		6:30

=== Remastered CD release with bonus tracks ===
Virgin / DIDCDR2

No.	Title	Writer(s)	Length
1.	"Bunker Soldiers"		2:54
2.	"Almost"		3:44
3.	"Mystereality"		2:45
4.	"Electricity"		3:39
5.	"The Messerschmitt Twins"		5:41
6.	"Messages"		4:12
7.	"Julia's Song"	McCluskey, Humphreys, Julia Kneale	4:41
8.	"Red Frame/White Light"		3:12
9.	"Dancing" (instrumental)		2:59
10.	"Pretending to See the Future"		3:48

Bonus tracks
No.	Title	Writer(s)	Length
11.	"Messages" (single version)		4:46
12.	"I Betray My Friends"		3:53
13.	"Taking Sides Again" (instrumental)		4:23
14.	"Waiting for the Man"	Lou Reed	3:00
15.	"Electricity" (Hannett/Cargo Studios version)		3:37
16.	"Almost" (Hannett/Cargo Studios version)		3:51

== Personnel ==
- Andy McCluskey – voice, bass, keyboards, electronic drums, drum programming.
- Paul Humphreys – keyboards, voice, percussion, electronic drums, drum programming.

=== Additional musicians ===
- Malcolm Holmes – percussion on "Julia's Song"
- Martin Cooper – saxophone on "Mystereality"
- Dave Fairbairn – guitar on "Messages" and "Julia's Song"

== Charts ==
=== Weekly charts ===
Weekly chart performance for Orchestral Manoeuvres in the Dark
Chart (1980)	Peak position
New Zealand Albums (RMNZ)	49
UK Albums (Official Charts)	27

=== Year-end charts ===
Year-end chart performance for Orchestral Manoeuvres in the Dark
Chart (1980)	Position
UK Albums (OCC)	74

== Certifications ==
Certifications for Orchestral Manoeuvres in the Dark
Region	Certification	Certified units/sales
United Kingdom (BPI)	Gold	100,000^{^}
^{^} Shipments figures based on certification alone.
