= Modern Eon =

British post-punk/new wave band

- Origin: Liverpool, England
- Genres: Post-punk, new wave
- Years active: 1978–1982
- Label: Dindisc
- Past members: Alix Johnson (Alix Plain); Danny Hampson; Dave Hardbattle; Bob Wakelin; Tim Lever; Cliff Hewitt; Ged Allen; Joe McKechnie

Modern Eon were a British post-punk/new wave band, formed in Liverpool in 1978. They released one album, Fiction Tales, on the UK label Dindisc in 1981.

== History ==
The band, originally called Luglo Slugs, were founded by guitarist/vocalist Alix Plain (real name Alex Johnson), guitarist/vocalist Mally Jackson and bassist Danny Hampson. Joe Mckechnie joined on drums. The group was later joined by drummer Dave Hardbattle. The Luglo Slugs lineup recorded "Benched Down/70s Sixties" at Open Eye Studios in Liverpool. Soon after the recording, Hardbattle left. Guitarist Ged Allen and drummer Joe McKechnie joined, and the band eventually decided on the name Modern Eon. The Open Eye recording was released under the name Modern Eon in late 1978 on the compilation album Street to Street: A Liverpool Album.

After one self-released EP, Pieces, released on Eon Records in 1979, they recorded the single "Euthenics" for Inevitable Records in 1980. Allen and McKechnie left the band in 1980, prior to the recording of their debut album, and were replaced by Bob Wakelin (strings, vocals, percussion) and Tim Lever (guitar, saxophone), with Cliff Hewitt (drums) joining shortly thereafter.

In early 1981, a rerecorded version of "Euthenics" was released as a single on Dindisc followed by two more singles, "Child's Play" and "Mechanic". Fiction Tales was released in mid 1981 to lukewarm reviews, citing disappointment at six of the twelve songs on the album already being released as singles or B sides. Later reviews were more positive. After a tour was arranged that year, drummer Hewitt critically injured his wrist, forcing them to go on tour using Hewitt's drum playing on a tape machine. Modern Eon dissolved by the end of 1981 while working on demos for a second album, which was never released.

Lever later played with Dead or Alive, while Hewitt was a member of Apollo 440. Alix Johnson (Alix Plain) went on to make music as St. Ché, releasing industrial dance music produced by Adrian Sherwood.

== Discography ==
=== Studio albums ===
- Fiction Tales - (1981), Dindisc - UK No. 65

=== Singles and EPs ===
- Pieces - 7-inch EP (1979), Eon
- "Euthenics"/"Waiting for the Cavalry" - 7-inch single (1980), Inevitable
- "Euthenics"/"Cardinal Signs" - 7-inch single (1981), Dindisc
- "Child's Play"/"Visionary" - 7-inch single (1981), Dindisc
- "Mechanic"/"Splash!" - 7-inch single (1981), Dindisc

=== Compilation appearances ===
- "Benched Down/70s Sixties" on Street to Street: A Liverpool Album (1979, Open Eye Records)
- "Choreography" on "Hicks From The Sticks" (1980, Rockburgh Records)
