= Fiction Tales =

Studio album by Modern Eon
- Released: 1981
- Recorded: The Manor, Britannia Row Studios
- Genre: Post-punk
- Label: Dindisc
- Producer: Modern Eon, Lawrence Diana

Modern Eon chronology
Pieces EP (1979)	Fiction Tales (1981)

Fiction Tales is the only studio album by English post-punk band Modern Eon. It was released in 1981 on record label Dindisc and reached No. 65 on the UK Albums Chart.

== Track listing ==
Side A
No.	Title	Length
1.	"Second Still"
2.	"The Grass Still Grows"
3.	"Playwrite"
4.	"Watching the Dancers"
5.	"Real Hymn"
6.	"Waiting for the Cavalry"

Side B
No.	Title	Length
1.	"High Noon"
2.	"Child's Play"
3.	"Choreography"
4.	"Euthenics"
5.	"In a Strange Way"
6.	"Mechanic"

== Critical reception ==
Professional ratings
Review scores
Source	Rating
AllMusic	4/5 stars

Trouser Press wrote, "Although not an easy album to like, Fiction Tales does convey originality and stylishness as well as flashes of accessibility; occasional use of odd instrumentation and a good drummer make this more than just a routine genre exercise".

== Personnel ==
- Danny Hampson – bass guitar
- Cliff Hewitt – drums, timpani
- Tim Lever – guitar, saxophone
- Alix Johnson – guitar, vocals, Chinese horn, piano
- Bob Wakelin – synthesizer, strings, percussion, vocals on "High Noon"

Technical

- Modern Eon - production
- Lawrence Diana – co-production, engineering
