= Architecture & Morality =

Studio album by Orchestral Manoeuvres in the Dark
- Released: 6 November 1981
- Recorded: 1980–1981
- Studios: Gramophone Suite (Liverpool); The Manor (Shipton-on-Cherwell); Mayfair (London)
- Genres: Synth-pop; electropop
- Length: 37:13
- Label: Dindisc
- Producers: Richard Manwaring; OMD; Mike Howlett

Orchestral Manoeuvres in the Dark chronology
Organisation (1980)	Architecture & Morality (1981)	Dazzle Ships (1983)

Singles from Architecture & Morality
- 1. "Souvenir" Released: 21 August 1981; 2. "Joan of Arc" Released: 16 October 1981; 3. "Maid of Orleans (The Waltz Joan of Arc)" Released: 15 January 1982; 4. "She's Leaving" Released: 17 June 1982 (Benelux only)

Architecture & Morality is the third studio album by the English electronic band Orchestral Manoeuvres in the Dark (OMD), released on 6 November 1981 by Dindisc. Inspired by religious music, the group sought to broaden their musical palette by utilising elaborate choral samples, the Mellotron, and other new instruments to create a more naturalistic, emotive sound. The artwork was designed by longtime OMD collaborator Peter Saville, along with associate Brett Wickens, while its title was derived from the book Morality and Architecture by David Watkin.

Architecture & Morality reached number three on the UK Albums Chart, and was a top-10 entry across Europe. The record met with lukewarm reviews, but garnered acclaim from critics and other artists in the following years. It has been recognised as a seminal album of its era and the synth-pop genre, appearing in rankings of the best records of 1981 and the wider decade. Architecture & Morality has also been featured in "all-time" lists, including the book 1001 Albums You Must Hear Before You Die.

The record became a commercial success, selling over four million copies and spawning three international hit singles – "Souvenir", "Joan of Arc" and "Maid of Orleans" – which together sold eight million copies. OMD have staged multiple tours based around the album.

== Background ==
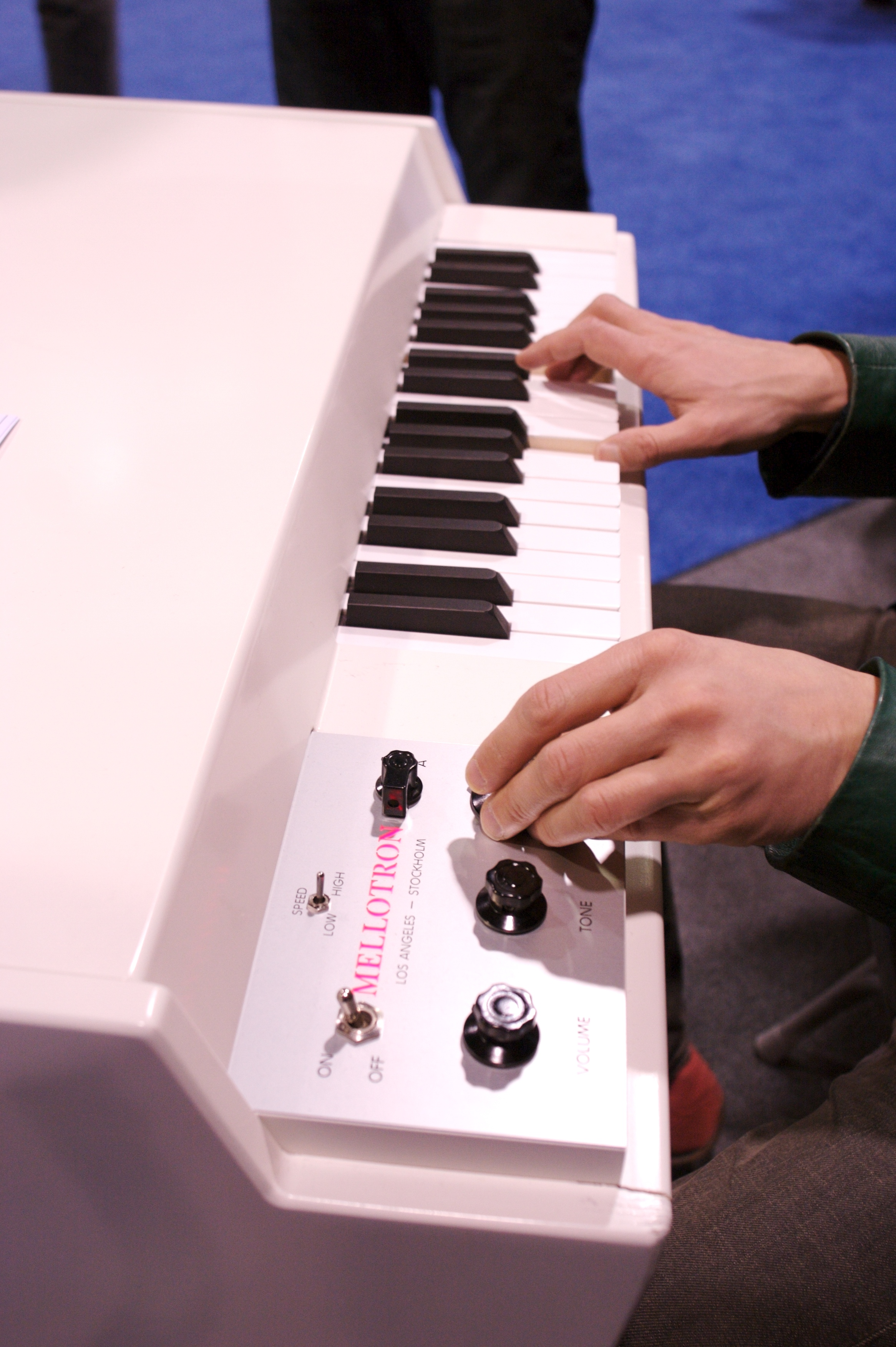
During recording, the band introduced a number of new instruments to their sound palette, including the Mellotron.

During the initial sessions for Architecture & Morality, OMD were looking for a new musical direction. Frontman Andy McCluskey, a longtime atheist, told how the band "found a lot of influence in the emotional power of religious music". McCluskey informed Melody Maker at the time, "I haven't gone and 'got God'... It's just trying to understand why people need religion and believe in it." The group spent two months recording at The Manor Studio, Shipton-on-Cherwell, with additional recording completed at the band's own Gramophone Suite in Liverpool. Mixing took place at Mayfair Studios, London. Instrumentalist Martin Cooper left and re-joined the group during the making of the album, missing the bulk of the sessions. During his absence he formed Godot with former OMD session musician David Hughes.

A catalyst in the development of OMD's new sound was Hughes' use of the band's studio to manipulate choral samples he had recorded; the album is noted for making liberal use of those samples, as well as of the Mellotron, a mechanical tape-replay keyboard. The group introduced other new instruments, including prominent guitars on opening track "The New Stone Age", whose sound was intended to startle the OMD audience. All of these measures combined to produce a more naturalistic, emotive sound than on previous OMD releases.

According to the album's credits, its title was suggested to the band by Martha Ladly (formerly of Martha and the Muffins), who had read the 1977 book Morality and Architecture by David Watkin. Ladly, who was also a designer, was at the time the girlfriend of Peter Saville, the album's sleeve designer. McCluskey felt the title Architecture & Morality represented the interplay between the human and mechanical aspects of OMD: "We had the 'architecture', which was the technology, the drum machines, the rigid playing, the attempt to break out of the box by playing specifically crafted sounds, and the 'morality', the organic, the human, the emotional touch, which we brought naturally."

"Souvenir" was the first track to be written for the album. "Sealand" was named after the Royal Air Force's Sealand base in Flintshire, near Chester; it is also a nod to the Neu! song "Seeland". The sample-heavy title track was compiled in the studio over a three-day period. "The Beginning and the End" was an older composition that the band had previously attempted to record but had shelved due to being unsatisfied with the results. The songs avoided the verse-chorus-verse format, utilising lengthy instrumental passages and substituting choruses with synthesizer lines. Lyrics were largely inspired by historical figures and events, including Joan of Arc, after whom two songs were named. The tenth-through-sixteenth tracks of the remastered edition are bonus tracks and were B-sides from the album's three singles – except for "Gravity Never Failed", which was an out-take from the Architecture & Morality sessions (its original title, "Georgia", was transferred to another song on the record). This track was envisaged as a single, but was not released until it featured as the B-side of "Dreaming" (1988). "Of All the Things We've Made", and a completed version of "The Romance of the Telescope (Unfinished)", would appear on OMD's next album, Dazzle Ships (1983).

The cover artwork was produced by Peter Saville and associate Brett Wickens. Inspirations included "art movements like The Circle, and... mid-century iconic furniture like [Le] Corbusier and [Alvar] Aalto".

== Singles ==
Architecture & Morality yielded three singles, all of which reached the top five of the UK Singles Chart: "Souvenir" (number three), "Joan of Arc" (number five), and "Maid of Orleans (The Waltz Joan of Arc)" (number four), a retitled "Joan of Arc (Maid of Orleans)". Two singles were also successful in a variety of territories, with "Souvenir" and "Maid of Orleans" each charting at number one in various European countries; the latter became Germany's biggest-selling single of 1982. "Joan of Arc" was only released in the UK. The three singles sold eight million copies combined.

Dindisc proposed "She's Leaving" as a fourth single, but the group refused, believing this would over-exploit the album; the label did proceed with a small-scale release in the Benelux region. OMD later regretted their decision, attributing it to being young and pretentious. Classic Pop described "She's Leaving" as "the great OMD single that never was".

== Critical reception ==
Professional ratings
Review scores
Source	Rating
All Music Guide to Rock	5/5 stars
Daily Record	5/5 stars
LA Weekly	A
The Philadelphia Inquirer	4/5 stars
Pitchfork	8.7/10
Q	5/5 stars
Record Collector	5/5 stars
Record Mirror	4/5 stars
Smash Hits	9/10
Sounds	5/5 stars

Architecture & Morality initially met with a lukewarm critical response. Lynden Barber of Melody Maker wrote: "I don't believe the Orchs even care about this record... the style is the same, the content profoundly different, the onslaught of emptiness, frivolity disguised by furrowed brows, a new brand of meaninglessness." Rolling Stone journalist David Fricke observed an "awkward mix of dreamy romanticism and spatial, Pink Floyd-ian abstractions", concluding that "too much sincerity and not enough spunk... make for attractive but dull fare." Paul Morley of NME said the album contains some "beautiful moments, melodically and structurally", but is "too polite to assault, excite or disturb the intellect. Too many meditative passages, too few climaxes of assertion." Record Mirror's Daniela Soave cautioned that the record "requires more effort on the listener's part", adding, "Although I had misgivings initially, Architecture & Morality is no disappointment."

Other music critics were unapologetically favourable. Dave McCullough of Sounds gave a five-star review in which he referred to Architecture & Morality as OMD's "best album yet" and a "classic in the making", while the Belfast Telegraph's Jim Cusack called it an "excellent album" by a band with "higher interests and concepts in music than most others of their genre." Ian Cranna of Smash Hits noted "varied and imaginative arrangements" that enhance the group's "wonderful melodies and intelligent lyrics", summarising the record as OMD's "most impressive achievement to date". Architecture & Morality was included in Billboard's "Recommended LPs".

"We didn't think it got the respect it deserved", said McCluskey in 1983. "We put a lot into it and we really loved it... anything which undermines our own unstable balance creates a problem for us." Sean O'Neal of The A.V. Club told how OMD responded to lacklustre reviews of the album by "pursu[ing] a darker, more defiantly experimental direction on its 1983 follow-up, Dazzle Ships—only to have the critics belatedly declare [Architecture & Morality] a masterpiece." In particular, a 1984 Melody Maker article, in which Helen Fitzgerald labelled the record "the first true masterpiece of the Eighties", offset the unflattering contemporary review printed in the magazine.

In the All Music Guide to Rock (2002), Ned Raggett wrote: "Combining everything from design and presentation to even the title into an overall artistic effort, this album showed that OMD was arguably the first Liverpool band since the later Beatles to make such a sweeping, all-bases-covered achievement." Mark Lindores of Classic Pop asserted that "Merging the machinations of German electronica with warm Merseyside melodies and otherworldly choral samples... OMD struck the perfect balance between experimentalism and commercial appeal." In Record Collector, John Doran observed an "astonishing record" whose content ranges from atmospheric love songs to the "propulsive and [Gary] Numanesque 'The New Stone Age'" and the sample-heavy "Georgia"; Doran also had praise for Saville's "austere and iconic" cover art. Author Lori Majewski said, "Architecture and Morality is so original, so special, so sublime, that if there were no other new wave bands to speak of, the entire genre could still hang its hat solely on that record."

== Legacy ==
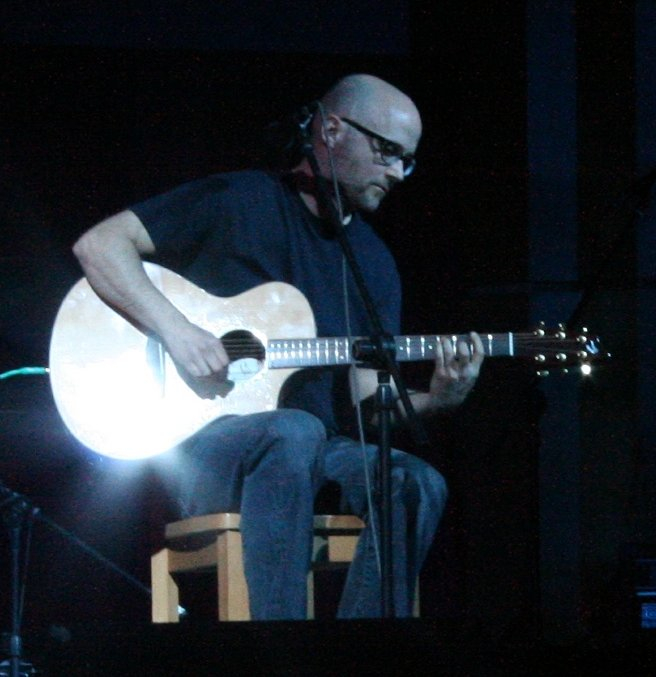
Multiple artists, including Moby, have cited the album as a personal favourite.

Architecture & Morality is frequently ranked among 1981's best albums; The Morning News placed it at number one, calling it "the blueprint for synth-pop". (Note: Architecture & Morality appears in numerous lists of 1981's best albums.) The record has been listed as one of the great works of its genre by outlets such as BBC Music Magazine, Télérama, and Paste, who rated it the fifth-best in history. (Note: The album is featured in lists of the great synth-pop records.) Music critics Tomasz Beksiński and Pieter Steinz each ranked Architecture & Morality among the five most important New Romantic albums, while Ultimate Classic Rock declared it one of the 40 "essential" new wave records and "a crucial connecting point in synth-pop's MTV-era transformation from wrist-slashing industrial-town dirges to sleek, love-struck modern pop music." Classic Pop numbered it the eighth-best electropop album ever made, observing "a fully realised work of art". Architecture & Morality has also appeared in lists of the great records of the 1980s by publications such as Uncut, Mojo and the St. Petersburg Times, as well as in broader selections like critic Mark Fisher's "Top 100 British Albums", Dagens Nyheter's "500 Best Albums", and the book 1001 Albums You Must Hear Before You Die (2021). (Note: The album appears in lists of the great records of the 1980s, as well as in broader "all-time" rankings.)

Architecture & Morality was influential on 1980s acts including the Pet Shop Boys, Étienne Daho, and Front Line Assembly's Rhys Fulber, who "became totally immersed in it, even buying the songbook and learning all the songs". The record has since been cited as a personal favourite by artists such as Frost, Tanita Tikaram, Tor Lundvall, the Divine Comedy's Neil Hannon, and Low's Alan Sparhawk. Musician Moby said of Architecture & Morality, "It's a perfect album, so cohesive, and every song perfectly speaks to the other song, the unapologetic emotional quality of it is really inspiring. Even the artwork by Peter Saville, everything about it is perfectly crafted." Underground Lovers credit their career to the record: "We were drawn in by the ticking drum machines, the gorgeous gothic synth sounds, the emotive vocals and the array of mysterious industrial sounds... The melodies on the album were irresistible."

Musicians Anohni, Spacemen 3's Peter Kember, and X Marks the Pedwalk's Sevren Ni-Arb have named Architecture & Morality an important record in their lives, with Ni-Arb noting a cohesive blend of "unique experimental and mainstream electronic pop music". Jamie Stewart of Xiu Xiu labelled it a "masterpiece", while Charlatans vocalist Tim Burgess staged a Twitter listening party of the album, describing it as "genius" and "absolutely beautiful". Architecture & Morality has received further endorsements from musicians including Kevin Hearn of Barenaked Ladies, Alex Naidus of the Pains of Being Pure at Heart, Ian Devaney of Nation of Language, and Jonn Penney of Ned's Atomic Dustbin, who selected it as the record he would place on a Christmas wish list.

Classic Pop wrote that Architecture & Morality is "revered as one of the seminal works of the synth-pop genre". Rolling Stone listed the album among the "key" synth-pop releases, further describing it as one of the 1980s' most influential records. The Edinburgh Evening News said the album secured OMD a "reputation as one of the most influential bands of a generation". Architecture & Morality has been the focus of three tours: as well as touring in support of the record upon its release, OMD included all of its songs in the main set of their 2007 comeback tour (which spawned the 2008 live album and DVD, OMD Live: Architecture & Morality & More), and also staged a 40th anniversary tour in 2021. The record has sold more than four million copies worldwide.

== Track listing ==
All songs by Andy McCluskey and Paul Humphreys, except where noted

Side one
No.	Title	Length
1.	"The New Stone Age" (McCluskey)	3:22
2.	"She's Leaving"	3:28
3.	"Souvenir" (Humphreys, Martin Cooper)	3:39
4.	"Sealand"	7:47

Side two
No.	Title	Length
5.	"Joan of Arc" (McCluskey)	3:48
6.	"Joan of Arc (Maid of Orleans)" (McCluskey)	4:12
7.	"Architecture and Morality"	3:43
8.	"Georgia"	3:24
9.	"The Beginning and the End"	3:48

2003 remastered CD bonus tracks
No.	Title	Length
10.	"Extended Souvenir" (Humphreys, Cooper)	4:16
11.	"Motion and Heart" (Amazon version)	3:07
12.	"Sacred Heart"	3:30
13.	"The Romance of the Telescope" (unfinished)	3:22
14.	"Navigation"	3:00
15.	"Of All the Things We've Made"	3:25
16.	"Gravity Never Failed"	3:24

2007 collector's edition bonus DVD
No.	Title	Length
1.	"Souvenir" (promo video)	3:25
2.	"Joan of Arc" (live on Top of the Pops, 29 October 1981)	2:58
3.	"Maid of Orleans (The Waltz Joan of Arc)" (promo video)	4:02
4.	"Almost" (live at the Theatre Royal, Drury Lane, 4 December 1981)	3:54
5.	"Mystereality" (live at the Theatre Royal, Drury Lane, 4 December 1981)	2:41
6.	"Joan of Arc" (live at the Theatre Royal, Drury Lane, 4 December 1981)	3:25
7.	"Motion and Heart" (live at the Theatre Royal, Drury Lane, 4 December 1981)	2:58
8.	"Maid of Orleans" (live at the Theatre Royal, Drury Lane, 4 December 1981)	3:14
9.	"Statues" (live at the Theatre Royal, Drury Lane, 4 December 1981)	3:49
10.	"Souvenir" (live at the Theatre Royal, Drury Lane, 4 December 1981)	3:25
11.	"The New Stone Age" (live at the Theatre Royal, Drury Lane, 4 December 1981)	3:02
12.	"Enola Gay" (live at the Theatre Royal, Drury Lane, 4 December 1981)	3:29
13.	"Bunker Soldiers" (live at the Theatre Royal, Drury Lane, 4 December 1981)	2:47
14.	"Electricity" (live at the Theatre Royal, Drury Lane, 4 December 1981)	4:17
15.	"She's Leaving" (live at the Theatre Royal, Drury Lane, 4 December 1981)	4:26
16.	"Julia's Song" (live at the Theatre Royal, Drury Lane, 4 December 1981)	4:25
17.	"Stanlow" (live at the Theatre Royal, Drury Lane, 4 December 1981)	6:28

Notes

- "Navigation" is edited some 30 seconds shorter at the end; the full original length version (3:26) is available on Navigation: The OMD B-Sides.
- Disc one of the 2007 collector's edition is the same as the 2003 remastered CD.

== Personnel ==
- Paul Humphreys – synthesisers, piano, Mellotron, acoustic and electronic percussion, organ, rhythm programming, radios, melodica and vocals
- Andy McCluskey – synthesisers, Mellotron, guitar, bass, rhythm programming, acoustic and electronic percussion, reed horns, organ and vocals
- Malcolm Holmes – drums, electronic and acoustic percussion, bass synthesiser
- Martin Cooper – saxophone
- Michael Douglas – synthesisers, piano, organ

== Charts ==
=== Weekly charts ===
Weekly chart performance for Architecture & Morality
Chart (1981–1982)	Peak position
Australian Albums (Kent Music Report)	62
Austrian Albums (Ö3 Austria)	16
Canada Top Albums/CDs (RPM)	18
Dutch Albums (Album Top 100)	1
German Albums (Offizielle Top 100)	8
New Zealand Albums (RMNZ)	22
Spanish Albums (AFYVE)	3
Swedish Albums (Sverigetopplistan)	28
UK Albums (Official Charts)	3
US Billboard 200	144

=== Year-end charts ===
1981 year-end chart performance for Architecture & Morality
Chart (1981)	Position
UK Albums (OCC)	34

1982 year-end chart performance for Architecture & Morality
Chart (1982)	Position
Canada Top Albums/CDs (RPM)	72
Dutch Albums (Album Top 100)	8
German Albums (Offizielle Top 100)	24
UK Albums (OCC)	23

== Certifications ==
Certifications for Architecture & Morality
Region	Certification	Certified units/sales
Netherlands (NVPI)	Gold	50,000^{^}
Spain (Promusicae)	Platinum	100,000^{^}
United Kingdom (BPI)	Platinum	300,000^{^}
^{^} Shipments figures based on certification alone.
