= Ben Kelly (designer) =

British interior designer

- Born: 1949 (age 76–77); Appletreewick, West Riding of Yorkshire, England
- Occupation: Interior designer
- Spouse: Clare Cumberlidge
- Website: benkellydesign.com

Ben Kelly (born 1949) is a British interior designer, who owns interior design firm Ben Kelly Design. He has also won awards for graphic design.

== Biography ==
Ben Kelly grew up in the village of Appletreewick, then in the West Riding of Yorkshire. Kelly trained at Lancaster College of Art from 1964 to 1969, and graduated in Interior Design from the Royal College of Art in 1974. He was awarded the title Royal Designer for Industry (RDI) in 2007. Kelly is an Honorary Doctor, and Professor of Interior Design at London's Kingston University. In 2018, Kelly was awarded an Honorary Fellowship from the Royal College of Art.

He is cited by The Visual Dictionary of Interior Architecture and Design as a "hugely influential interior designer", and by Kingston University as "one of the UK's most influential interior designers".

Historic England has listed the Kelly designed Haçienda nightclub in Manchester as one of the 100 Places that tell the story of England and its impact on the world.

== Studio ==
Kelly's signature black and yellow stripes originated at The Haçienda

In 1974, manager Malcolm McLaren asked Kelly to refurbish a basement rehearsal room for The Sex Pistols in Denmark Street, London, which McLaren had bought from Badfinger. Kelly had designed the store front for Vivien Westwood and McLaren's Seditionaries boutique. In 1977, Kelly was also arrested with Westwood and McLaren when police raided The Sex Pistols' Silver Jubilee cruise, organised by Richard Branson to launch the single "God Save the Queen". Kelly was also known at the time by his alter ego "The Photo Kid", and he still uses the name on social media.

Kelly collaborated with the graphic designer Peter Saville on numerous projects who acknowledged basing much of his early work on Kelly's. Kelly and Saville won a Designers and Art Directors Award for the sleeve of Orchestral Manoeuvres in the Dark's 1980 self-titled first album.

Kelly is best known for his interior design of The Haçienda nightclub in Manchester, which he converted from a yacht showroom in 1982, retaining its red brick façade, inner columns and large iron doors. Kelly was recommended to design The Haçienda by Saville. Kelly also did much other work for Factory Records, including their 1990 company office in Charles Street, Manchester.

In 1995, Kelly designed Saville's legendary Mayfair apartment in London that was also shared by Meiré und Meiré. The mood and mythologies of that space inspired and informed a shoot with Nick Knight for the July 2009 'Sex' issue of Wallpaper magazine. Kelly has designed several gyms for Gymbox in London, and is also a furniture designer. Kelly has recently completed several collaborations with Virgil Abloh; Josephine Nightclub in Paris, and a DJ touring set that Abloh travels with and debuted at Art Basel Miami.

=== Influences ===
On arriving in London in 1971, Kelly was greatly influenced by Kenneth Anger's films and visiting the 'When Attitudes Become Form' exhibition at the Institute of Contemporary Arts. Kelly cites Andy Warhol and Marcel Duchamp as his two main influences.

Kelly has acknowledged the bright colours, bold lines and disposable aesthetics of Max Clendinning designs, as well as Ralph Adron's visualisations of Clendinning's work.

=== Style ===
International Orange
(Golden Gate Bridge)
#F04A00

Kelly's style can be summarised by his description of his dream interior being "A mash up between Andy Warhol's original Silver Studio, Kurt Schwitters' Merzbau, Adolf Loos' Kärntner Bar in Vienna and Frank Gehry's house in LA!"

The design of The Haçienda has been described as post-industrial. Peter Saville observed at the time that Punk had levelled the ground and there was a strong feeling that it was a post-revolutionary moment.

The colour International orange, which he used in The Haçienda and many subsequent projects, is considered a Kelly signature.

=== Legacy ===
Kelly and Saville's work has been referenced numerous times by Raf Simons.

As a tribute to both the anniversary of The Haçienda and the grand opening of the UK's first Yohji Yamamoto Y-3 exclusive store, a special Adidas FAC51-Y3 model was created in 2007.

Manchester City and Puma's 2019/20 football jersey featured Kelly's signature black and yellow stripes.

Virgil Abloh states, "the diagonal lines of my brand's logo are very similar to the work of Ben Kelly. My whole thing is very much about urban credibility, I work with people I can share with my generation as it's an access point for a young kid because the art world is so far off in the distance and protected from them".

The 2002 film 24 Hour Party People tells the stories that centred around The Haçienda, with a reproduction of the club built for the film.

Vitra Design Museum and ADAM - Brussels Design Museum coproduced the 'Night Fever: Designing Club Culture' exhibition to explore how architecture and interior design merged with sound, light, fashion, graphics and visual effects to create epicentres of pop culture.

== Bibliography ==
- Coates, Michael; Brooker, Graeme; Stone, Sally (6 January 2009). The Visual Dictionary of Interior Architecture and Design. AVA Publishing. p. 132. ISBN 978-2-940373-80-2.
- Hessler, Martina; Zimmermann, Clemens (2008). Creative Urban Milieus: Historical Perspectives on Culture, Economy, and the City. Campus Verlag. ISBN 978-3-593-38547-1.
- Matovina, Dan (2000). Without You: The Tragic Story of "Badfinger". Frances Glover Books. ISBN 978-0-9657122-2-4.
- Nice, James (2011) [2010]. Shadowplayers: The Rise and Fall of Factory Records (paperback ed.). London: Aurum Press. ISBN 978-1-84513-634-5.
