= Gymbox =

British fitness company

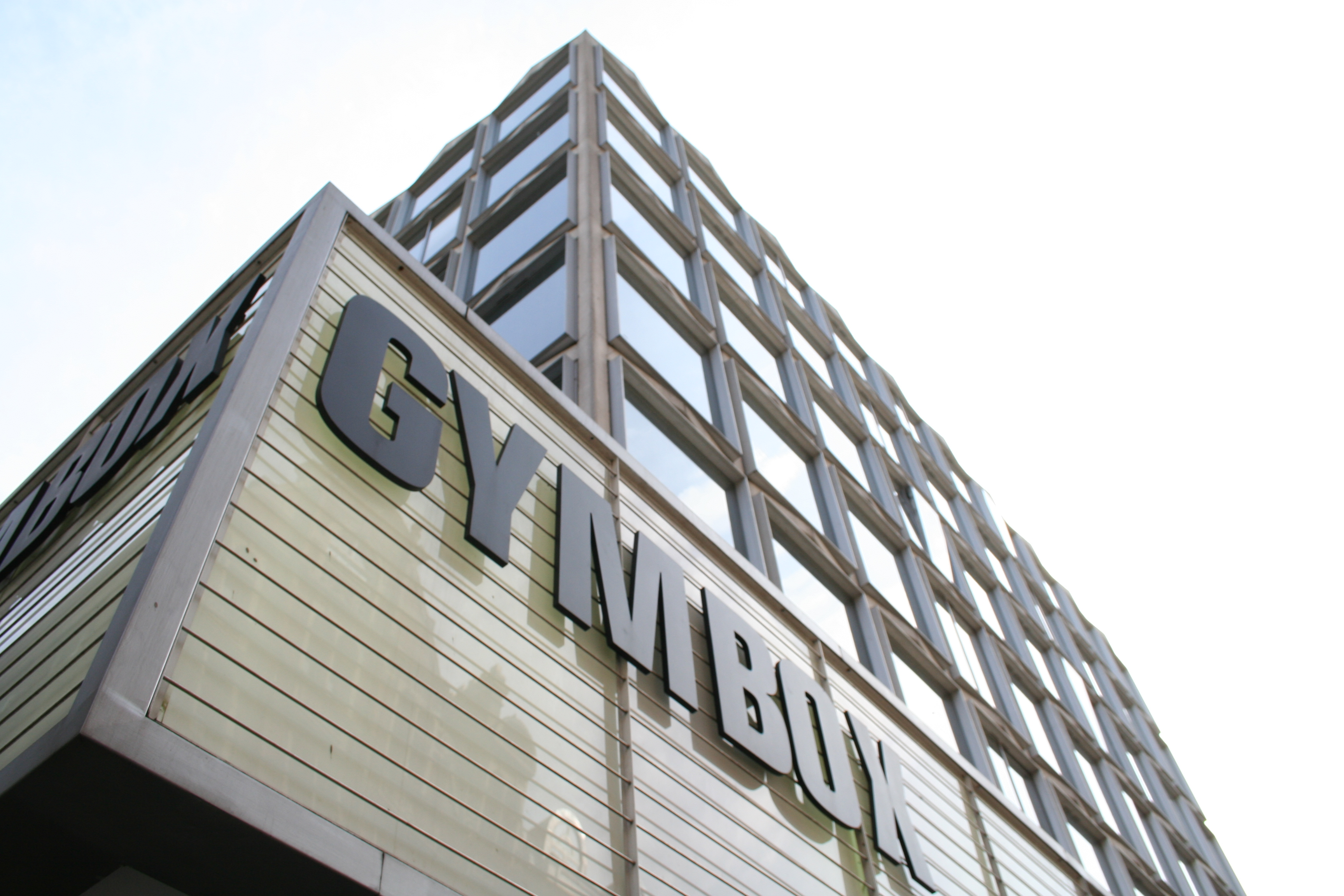
- Company type: Private
- Industry: Health clubs
- Founded: 2004
- Headquarters: United Kingdom
- Number of locations: 10 clubs
- Area served: UK
- Services: Health and wellness services

Gymbox is a British fitness company that runs gyms in London.

Gymbox was cited as "one of the trendier additions to London's flourishing fitness scene... Gymbox is aimed at fitness freaks with deep pockets". Lonely Planet considered it to be the most popular gym in London.

== History ==
The company spent £2 million on its first gym.
