= Joan of Arc (Orchestral Manoeuvres in the Dark song) =

Single by Orchestral Manoeuvres in the Dark

from the album Architecture & Morality
- B-side: "The Romance of the Telescope" (Unfinished)
- Released: 16 October 1981
- Studio: The Manor (Shipton-on-Cherwell, Oxfordshire)
- Genre: Synth-pop
- Length: 3:48
- Label: Dindisc
- Songwriter: Andy McCluskey
- Producers: OMD; Richard Manwaring

Orchestral Manoeuvres in the Dark singles chronology
"Souvenir" (1981)	"Joan of Arc" (1981)	"Maid of Orleans (The Waltz Joan of Arc)" (1982)

Audio video
- "Joan Of Arc (Remastered)" on YouTube

"Joan of Arc" is a 1981 song by the English electronic band Orchestral Manoeuvres in the Dark (OMD), released as the second single from their third studio album Architecture & Morality. It was well-received by critics and became a hit in the British Isles, reaching number 5 in the UK and number 13 in Ireland. The single also peaked at number 2 in Luxembourg.

This is the first of two OMD songs written by lead vocalist Andy McCluskey on the subject of the French patron saint Joan of Arc. The second, "Joan of Arc (Maid of Orleans)" was also issued as a single (renamed "Maid of Orleans (The Waltz Joan of Arc)" for its release). Both tracks feature on Architecture & Morality.

== Reception and legacy ==
"Joan of Arc" met with a positive critical response. Lenny Juviski of The Northern Echo wrote, "Haunting and melodic modernists [OMD] with their best offering since 'Enola Gay'. Set to be a smash." In the Face, journalist Ian Cranna felt the "lush, melodic" song had "obvious" hit potential; Cranna also ranked it no. 1 in a 26 November list of his "current listening pleasure". Sunie Fletcher of Record Mirror said the track has a "tender mood" and is "not particularly striking on first hearing", but allowed that it may be a "grower" akin to previous single "Souvenir".

In a retrospective review, AllMusic's Ned Raggett described "Joan of Arc" as "a towering heartbreaker, with Andy McCluskey and band in full flight". Critic Dave Thompson observed a "revelation of a single" with a "gorgeous melody", adding that "the power of this song is almost equal to Joan's own". Trouser Press called the track a "magnificent, ethereal hit".

"Joan of Arc" has appeared in various "best songs" lists, including musician and journalist Paul Roland's "100 Essential Singles". The Charlatans vocalist Tim Burgess wrote, "For anyone who wasn't around in 1981 you could not go anywhere without hearing this song... such a classic." Former Built to Spill bassist, Brett Nelson, named the "melancholy and beautiful" track as one of the seven "milestones to [his] wanting to be a musician".

== B-side ==
The B-side to the single was a new track entitled "The Romance of the Telescope (Unfinished)". The song was later remixed and featured on Dazzle Ships (1983), without the "unfinished" caveat. The B-side version was included on remastered re-issues of Architecture & Morality in 2003 and 2007. "The Romance of the Telescope" has been performed on several occasions since 1981 when it was usually played as a concert opener, although more recently as a final song on live set lists.

== Track listings ==
=== 7" vinyl single ===
- UK: DinDisc DIN 36

Side one

1. "Joan of Arc" (McCluskey)

Side two

1. "The Romance of the Telescope (Unfinished)" (Humphreys, McCluskey)

=== 12" vinyl single ===
- UK: DinDisc DIN 36-12
1. "Joan of Arc" (McCluskey)

Side two

1. "The Romance of the Telescope (Unfinished)" (Humphreys, McCluskey)

Track timings were not stated on vinyl releases.

== Single cover photograph ==
The statue of Joan of Arc that is depicted on the cover of the single is thought to be the same one that was present in the National Trust Gardens at Cliveden in Buckinghamshire. In 1980–81, this statue could be found among the trees in the Ilex Grove at Cliveden.

== Charts ==
Weekly chart performance for "Joan of Arc"
Chart (1981)	Peak position
Canada (RPM)	32
Ireland (IRMA)	13
Luxembourg (Radio Luxembourg)	2
UK Singles (Official Charts)	5

== Certifications ==
Region	Certification	Certified units/sales
United Kingdom (BPI)	Silver	250,000^{^}
^{^} Shipments figures based on certification alone.

== Live performances ==
The song has been performed at live shows on a regular basis since the Architecture & Morality tour in 1981. A live performance from 1981 was filmed for the Live at The Theatre Royal, Drury Lane concert in December 1981, initially released on VHS (1982) and LaserDisc (1984) and later on DVD

Live recordings have been made available on the "Walking on the Milky Way" CD single (1996), the Architecture & Morality & More album (2008), and on Architecture & Morality / Dazzle Ships – Live at the Royal Albert Hall (2016). The song was also performed with The Royal Liverpool Philharmonic Orchestra in June 2009 as documented by the Electricity DVD release.
