= Ceramic Hello =

Canadian musical duo

- Genres: Minimal wave; Post-punk
- Years active: 1980–1983
- Label: Mannequin Records
- Past members: Brett Wickens; Roger Humphreys
- Website: ceramichello.com

Ceramic Hello was an electronic music duo from Burlington, Ontario, formed by Brett Wickens in 1980 after leaving Spoons. He teamed up with Roger Humphreys who added a classical influence to the minimal synthesizer compositions (in the mold of John Foxx and Mute Records).

== History ==
Wickens began working with the classically trained Humphreys after departing the band Spoons. Ceramic Hello's first release was the single "Climatic Nouveaux" (MAN003) on Mannequin Records in 1980, followed in 1981 by the album The Absence of a Canary (MAN LP1). The album was recorded on a TASCAM eight-track reel-to-reel and mixed in a 16-track studio in Waterdown, Ontario; production was limited to 1000 copies. Influences on the largely-instrumental record include Brian Eno, Gary Numan and Kraftwerk. The Absence of a Canary gained some popularity on college radio, reaching the top 10 of CKCU-FM's "Alternative Record Chart" for June 1981. Ceramic Hello were produced by Mannequin founder Paul Abrahams. The duo neglected to pursue the club circuit, Wickens explaining, "People don't want to listen. They're there to drink and talk." Ceramic Hello instead hoped that word of mouth would help them garner an audience.

"This duo replaces Gary Numan glibness with futuristic emotionalism; the unsettling electronic sonatas could teach Devo something about surrealism. If they'd come from London, Brett Wickens and Roger Humphreys might be the toast of the music press by now."

— Trouser Press, 1981

The Absence of a Canary has garnered retrospective praise. The album was included in Fact magazine's 2010 list, "The 20 Best Minimal Wave Records Ever Made", and was described by Self-Titled magazine as "one of the [1980s'] great Canadian electronic records". Danilo Bulatovic at CKUT-FM wrote, "I am delighted that Absence of a Canary has been uncovered and hope it will continue to merit the attention it deserves as a pioneering Canadian minimal synth record." The album was also endorsed by Fucked Up frontman Damian Abraham. The Absence of a Canary has twice been re-issued: in 2006 by the German label Vinyl On Demand, and in 2012 by the Toronto-based Suction Records. The re-issues included the original album along with Ceramic Hello's demos from the early 1980s.

Wickens' design career paralleled his musical career in the 1980s, when he was in partnership with Peter Saville, and designed many LP covers for Orchestral Manoeuvres in the Dark, Peter Gabriel, New Order, Joy Division and Ultravox, among others. As of 2014, Wickens and Humphreys were set to begin writing a new Ceramic Hello album, with the working title Daisy Cutter.

== Discography ==
=== Album ===
- The Absence of a Canary (1981)

=== Single ===
- "Climatic Nouveaux" (1980)
