= Brett Wickens =

British-Canadian creative director (born 1961)

- Born: April 15, 1961 (age 65); Hamilton, Ontario, Canada
- Citizenship: Canadian, British, American
- Occupations: Graphic designer, musician, photographer
- Known for: Logo design and branding, Spoons, Ceramic Hello
- Notable work: The logotype for HBO's The Sopranos
- Spouse: Coraline Langston-Jones
- Children: 2
- Website: studiobrettwickens.com

Brett Wickens (born April 15, 1961) is a Canadian graphic designer and musician known for his work with identity design. He is a partner with the Ammunition Design Group, and lives and works in the San Francisco Bay Area. Among other musical endeavors, Wickens was a founding member of the bands Spoons and Ceramic Hello.

== Biography ==
Wickens worked with British graphic designer Peter Saville as a partner in his London studio during the 1980s and 1990s, where they developed campaigns for clients such as Yohji Yamamoto, Factory Records, Peter Gabriel, and the French Ministry of Culture. Wickens was involved in the creation of the artwork for Gabriel's So (1986), which, according to Creative Review, is "widely regarded as a design classic". In 1990, he became an Associate Partner in Pentagram's London office, departing three years later.

In 1993, Wickens moved to Los Angeles to become VP Creative Director at Frankfurt Balkind Partners. He designed the logotype for HBOs The Sopranos. In 1999, Wickens became the Global Creative Director of Sapient before joining MetaDesign as VP Creative Director in 2002. He was a founding partner of DreamSurface, a mobile application design company best known for the product TimeTuner. Wickens subsequently became a partner with the Ammunition Design Group.

He has been a guest speaker on NPR, contributing editor at EYE magazine, teacher at the California Institute of the Arts, and speaker at many symposia, including the RGD Design Thinkers Conference 2008 in Toronto, and the Creative Review Click Conference 2010 in San Francisco. Wickens was awarded in 2016 the Smithsonian Cooper-Hewitt National Design Award. He has said of his approach to design, "I've pretty much based my career on one philosophy. Good design is not about what you put in, it's about what you leave out."

== Music career ==
Wickens was a founding member of the band Spoons, playing keyboards. He appeared on the group's debut single, "After the Institution" (1980), released on then-manager Paul Abrahams' Mannequin Records. Wickens subsequently left Spoons and joined with classically trained musician Roger Humphreys to form the duo Ceramic Hello. Through Mannequin they released a single, "Climatic Nouveaux" (1980), and an album, The Absence of a Canary (1981); Abrahams produced the duo. Trouser Press pondered whether Ceramic Hello would be the "toast of the music press", had they been from London.

The Absence of a Canary has twice been re-released, and has garnered a legacy among electronic music enthusiasts. Elsewhere, Wickens has composed with William Orbit, Jah Wobble (Public Image Ltd), Andy McCluskey (OMD), and Martha Ladly (Martha and the Muffins), among others.

== Personal life ==
Wickens is married to Coralie Langston-Jones and together they have twins, Jasmine and Sophia. They reside in the town of Lucas Valley in Marin County and live in an Eichler house.
