= Far Away in Time =

Far Away In Time

Compilation album by Martha and the Muffins
- Released: 1987
- Length: 68:51
- Label: Virgin
- Producer: Mike Howlett (tracks 1–15); Daniel Lanois and Martha & The Muffins (tracks 16–17)

Martha and the Muffins chronology
The World is a Ball (1986)	Far Away In Time (1987)	Modern Lullaby (1992)

Professional ratings
Review scores
Source	Rating
Allmusic	4/5 stars

Far Away in Time was a 1987 CD compilation of tracks by Martha and the Muffins. The compilation consisted of Metro Music (the band's first album) in its entirety (tracks 1–10), plus four tracks from Trance and Dance (tracks 12–15), two tracks from This is the Ice Age (tracks 16–17), and the non-album single "Insect Love" (track 11).

The album was compiled without any input from the band, and the poorly researched liner notes by Jon Hotten (on the 1993 re-issue) contain numerous errors about the history of the band's various line-ups, as well as several errors about the origins of the tracks on this compilation. The correct information is listed above.

The album title is from the lyrics of "Echo Beach".

== Track listing ==
No.	Title	Writer(s)	Length
1.	"Echo Beach"	Mark Gane	3:38
2.	"Paint by Number Heart"	Martha Johnson	3:28
3.	"Saigon"	Johnson, Daniel Millar	4:23
4.	"Indecision"	Johnson	4:23
5.	"Terminal Twilight"	Gane, Martha Ladly	4:42
6.	"Hide and Seek"	Gane, Ladly	3:59
7.	"Monotone"	Johnson	2:47
8.	"Sinking Land"	Gane	5:28
9.	"Revenge (Against the World)"	Gane	3:31
10.	"Cheesies and Gum"	Gane, Ladly	3:09
11.	"Insect Love"	Gane	4:14
12.	"About Insomnia"	Gane, Ladly	3:13
13.	"Motorbikin'"	Chris Spedding	2:56
14.	"Suburban Dream"	Gane	3:27
15.	"Was Ezo"	Ladly	3:58
16.	"Women Around the World at Work"	Gane	3:58
17.	"This Is the Ice Age"	Gane	7:27
