= Then Again: A Retrospective =

Greatest hits album by Martha and the Muffins
- Released: 1998
- Genre: New wave
- Label: EMI
- Producer: Mark Gane, Martha Johnson, Daniel Lanois

Martha and the Muffins chronology
Modern Lullaby (1992)	Then Again: A Retrospective (1998)	Delicate (2010)

Professional ratings
Review scores
Source	Rating
AllMusic	4.5/5 stars

Then Again: A Retrospective is a 1998 compilation album by Martha and the Muffins. Although credited to the band's original name, it includes songs from both the full name and M + M phases of the band's career.

The album contains one new song, "Resurrection", one of only two new tracks released by the band between their 1992 album Modern Lullaby and their 2010 album Delicate.

== Track listing ==
All tracks are written by Mark Gane and Martha Johnson; except where noted

No.	Title	Writer(s)	Length
1.	"Paint by Number Heart"	Johnson	3:29
2.	"Echo Beach"	Gane	3:34
3.	"Suburban Dream"	Gane	3:29
4.	"You Sold the Cottage"	Gane	3:59
5.	"Swimming"	Gane, Johnson, Tim Gane, Andy Haas, Daniel Lanois, Jocelyne Lanois	3:53
6.	"Women Around the World at Work"	Gane	3:57
7.	"World Without Borders"		3:08
8.	"Danseparc (Every Day It's Tomorrow)"		3:23
9.	"Obedience"	Johnson	3:32
10.	"Several Styles of Blonde Girls Dancing"		5:53
11.	"Black Stations/White Stations"		5:12
12.	"Come Out and Dance"	Gane, Johnson, Daniel Lanois	4:50
13.	"Cooling the Medium"		3:42
14.	"Song in My Head"		4:36
15.	"By the Waters of Babylon"		4:57
16.	"Rainbow Sign"		4:41
17.	"Fighting the Monster"		3:17
18.	"Resurrection"		3:46
