= Metro Music =

1980 album by Martha and the Muffins

Studio album by Martha and the Muffins
- Released: February 1980
- Recorded: August 1979
- Studio: Manor
- Genre: New wave; dance-punk
- Length: 40:17
- Label: Dindisc
- Producer: Mike Howlett

Martha and the Muffins chronology
Metro Music (1980)	Trance and Dance (1980)

Singles from Metro Music
- 1. "Echo Beach" Released: February 8, 1980; 2. "Saigon" Released: May 2, 1980; 3. "Paint by Number Heart" Released: 1980

Professional ratings
Review scores
Source	Rating
AllMusic	4/5 stars
Christgau's Record Guide	B−
Record Mirror	4/5 stars
Smash Hits	8/10

Metro Music is the debut album by Canadian new wave band Martha and the Muffins. It was released in 1980 on Dindisc, the first album release for the label, and contains the international hit single "Echo Beach".

The cover image design by Peter Saville is a map of Toronto, the band's hometown, and is based on a map from the National Topographic System of Canada.

The entire Metro Music album also formed the first part of Martha and the Muffins' 1987 compilation Far Away in Time.

== Release ==
The album's first single, "Echo Beach", became a hit in several countries, reaching number three in Canada, number one in Portugal, number five in Australia and number 10 in the United Kingdom in March 1980. It also reached number 37 in the United States on the Club Play Singles chart. A slightly different recording of "Saigon" was released as a follow-up single in the UK a few months later, but failed to chart. In Canada, the follow-up single was "Paint by Number Heart" — it climbed to number 69. The album itself was certified gold in Canada (50,000 units) on September 1, 1980; "Echo Beach" was certified gold there (5,000 units) on the following October 1.

== Track listing ==
No.	Title	Writer(s)	Length
1.	"Echo Beach"	Mark Gane	3:38
2.	"Paint by Number Heart"	Martha Johnson	4:23
3.	"Saigon"	Johnson, David Millar	4:23
4.	"Indecision"	Johnson	4:25
5.	"Terminal Twilight"	Gane, Martha Ladly	4:42
6.	"Hide and Seek"	Gane, Ladly	3:57
7.	"Monotone"	Johnson	2:46
8.	"Sinking Land"	Gane	5:27
9.	"Revenge (Against the World)"	Gane	3:31
10.	"Cheesies and Gum"	Gane, Ladly	3:05

== Personnel ==
- Martha Johnson – keyboards, vocals
- Martha Ladly – keyboards, trombone, vocals
- Mark Gane – synthesizer, guitar
- Carl Finkle – bass
- Tim Gane – drums
- Andy Haas – saxophone

== Chart performance ==
Album

Chart (1980)	Peak position
Australia (Kent Music Report)	46
UK Album Chart	34
U.S. Billboard 200	186

Singles

Single	Chart (1980)	Position
"Echo Beach"	Canada	3
"Echo Beach"	Australia (Kent Music Report)	5
"Echo Beach"	UK Singles Chart	10
"Echo Beach/Paint by Number Heart"	Billboard Club Play Singles	37
