= Stone (Crash Vegas album) =

Studio album by Crash Vegas
- Released: March 9, 1993
- Genre: Rock, folk rock, country rock
- Label: London
- Producer: John Porter

Crash Vegas chronology
Red Earth (1990)	Stone (1993)	Aurora (1995)

Stone is the second album by the Canadian band Crash Vegas, released on March 9, 1993. They supported it with a Canadian tour that was followed by a tour of the United States, opening for the Tragically Hip. The first single was "You and Me". The album peaked at No. 50 on the RPM 100.

== Production ==
Recorded in Los Angeles, the album was produced by John Porter. The band wanted a heavier sound, as they felt that their skills had improved while touring in support of their debut, and were also interested in not repeating themselves. The songs were written primarily by Michelle McAdorey, Greg Keelor, and Colin Cripps; McAdorey was chiefly influenced by Gram Parsons and the freedom found in punk music. "September Morning" is about Parsons. Darren Watson joined the band on bass, replacing Jocelyne Lanois. Cripps played a mando-guitar on some of the tracks. Ian McLagan contributed on electric organ. "One Way Conversation" was written by Dave Pirner; the band discovered it on a demo and decided to record it with Pirner while he was in Toronto. "Nothing Ever Happened" was mixed by Butch Vig.

== Critical reception ==
Professional ratings
Review scores
Source	Rating
AllMusic	3/5 stars
Calgary Herald	A

The Calgary Herald said that "Crash Vegas is now filled with a subtle, powerful passion that rages even in its quietest moments". The Kitchener-Waterloo Record opined that "McAdorey's voice has become one of the most intriguing in the folk-rock/rock-folk business." The Ottawa Citizen concluded, "The disc finds a good balance between rock, country and a touch of punk, with solid songwriting and musicianship. It could use some more variety in tempos; a few tunes find a nice groove, but it always seems to find its way back to that languishing country-style beat." The Morning Call called Stone "tuneful yet forgettable cow-pop".

The Vancouver Sun stated that "Cripps turns out to be a monster, reeling off a mind-blowing assortment of licks and leading the band through some fairly wild shifts in dynamics." The Washington Post said that "most of Stone is slow and twangy ... characterized by lonesome pedal steel and doleful lyrics." The Hamilton Spectator opined that Crash Vegas "has successfully combined taste with tragedy and created some mesmerizing music." Robert Christgau selected "You and Me" as a "Choice Cut". Trouser Press labeled Stone "listenable but uninspired", noting that "Please Don't Ask" has "a mournful lilt that arrives as a relief from the album's oppressive moments".

== Track listing ==
No.	Title	Length
1.	"You and Me"
2.	"One Way Conversation"
3.	"Keep It to Myself"
4.	"Stone"
5.	"My City Has a Place"
6.	"Nothing Ever Happened"
7.	"Gold & Silver"
8.	"September Morning"
9.	"1800 Days"
10.	"Please Don't Ask"
