= The World Is a Ball =

The World is a Ball

Studio album by Martha and the Muffins
- Released: May 1986
- Recorded: November 1984 – January 1986
- Genre: Pop
- Label: Current/RCA
- Producer: David Lord; Mark Gane; Martha Johnson

Martha and the Muffins chronology
Mystery Walk (1984)	The World is a Ball (1986)	Far Away in Time (1987)

Professional ratings
Review scores
Source	Rating
Allmusic	4/5 stars

The World is a Ball is a 1986 album by M + M. The album was recorded in Canada and in Bath, England.

The album's only notable single was "Song in My Head". Due to the album's poor chart performance, the band retired for several years, not releasing a new album until 1992's Modern Lullaby.

== Track listing ==
All tracks are written by Mark Gane and Martha Johnson

No.	Title	Length
1.	"The World Is a Ball"	4:16
2.	"I Watch I Wait"	3:44
3.	"Watching the Boys Fall Down"	4:00
4.	"Only You"	4:40
5.	"By the Waters of Babylon"	5:07
6.	"Song in My Head"	4:34
7.	"Don't Jump the Gun"	4:24
8.	"Stuck on the Grid"	4:10
9.	"Someone Else's Shoes"	4:20
10.	"As a Matter of Fact"	4:00

== Personnel ==
- Martha Johnson - guitar, keyboards, vocals
- Mark Gane - guitar, keyboards, vocals
- Eluriel Tinker - bass
- Yogi Horton - drums
- Michael Sloski - drums
- Dick Smith - percussion
- Paul Ridout - programming
- Tony Levin, Jerry Marotta, Shawne Jackson, Colina Phillips, Ruby Turner - background vocals
