= Lanois =

Lanois is a surname. Notable people with the surname include:

- Bob Lanois, Canadian sound engineer, music producer, and harmonica player
- Daniel Lanois, Canadian record producer and singer-songwriter
- Jocelyne Lanois, Canadian musician, bass player, and songwriter
