= Bus Ride =

A bus ride is a ride on a bus.

Bus Ride may also refer to:

== Books ==
- Bus Ride, children's book by Marilyn Sachs 1980

== Music ==
- "Bus Ride", song by Ry Cooder from My Blueberry Nights Original Soundtrack 2008
- "Bus Ride", single by Alex Lloyd 2002
- "Bus Ride", song by Quasimoto from The Further Adventures of Lord Quas
- "Bus Ride", by will.i.am from Freedom Writers Original Soundtrack 2007
- "Bus Ride", by Georges Delerue from Crimes of the Heart Original Motion Picture Score 1986
- "Bus Ride", by Reuben Wilson from Blue Mode 1969
- "Bus Ride", by Rocco DeLuca and the Burden from I Trust You to Kill Me 2006
- "Bus Ride", by Kaytranada from 99.9% 2016
