= Danseparc =

Studio album by Martha and the Muffins
- Released: February 1983
- Recorded: Spring–summer 1982
- Genre: New wave, dance
- Label: RCA
- Producer: Daniel Lanois with Mark Gane & Martha Johnson

Martha and the Muffins chronology
This Is the Ice Age (1981)	Danseparc (1983)	Mystery Walk (1984)

Singles from Danseparc
- 1. "Danseparc (Every Day It's Tomorrow)" Released: February 1983; 2. "World Without Borders" Released: 1983; 3. "Several Styles of Blonde Girls Dancing" Released: 1983

Professional ratings
Review scores
Source	Rating
Allmusic	4.5/5 stars

Danseparc was Martha and the Muffins' fourth album, recorded in 1982 at Grant Avenue Studios in Hamilton, Ontario, Canada, and released in 1983. The title single reached #31 in Canada.

This long out-of-print album was reissued on CD through the band's own Muffin Music imprint in North America with a release date of June 25, 2008. Three additional bonus tracks include the original extended dance version of “Danseparc”, “These Dangerous Machines” and a live version of “Sins Of Children” from M&M’s performance at Ontario Place in 1983 featuring avant-guitarist Michael Brook. On August 4, 2008, Cherry Records rereleased the album in the UK. Bass player Jocelyne Lanois is the sister of producer Daniel Lanois.

== Track listing ==
No.	Title	Writer(s)	Length
1.	"Obedience"	Martha Johnson	3:28
2.	"World Without Borders"	Mark Gane, Johnson	3:05
3.	"Walking into Walls"	Gane, Johnson	2:56
4.	"Danseparc (Every Day It's Tomorrow)"	Gane, Johnson	3:18
5.	"Sins of Children"	Johnson	5:35
6.	"Several Styles of Blonde Girls Dancing"	Gane, Johnson	5:50
7.	"Boys in the Bushes"	Gane	4:42
8.	"What People Do for Fun"	Johnson	4:00
9.	"Whatever Happened to Radio Valve Road?"	Gane, Johnson, Jocelyne Lanois, Nick Kent	2:51

== Personnel ==
- Martha Johnson - guitar, keyboards, vocals
- Mark Gane - guitar, keyboards, vocals
- Jocelyne Lanois - bass
- Nick Kent - drums, percussion

with:

- Daniel Lanois - treatments
- Nick Gane - synthesizer, piano
- Glenn Schellenberg - synthesizer
- Dick Smith - percussion
- Ron Allen - saxophone
- John Oswald - saxophone
- Debbie Griffiths - background vocals
