= Desire (Toyah Willcox album) =

Studio album by Toyah
- Released: 1 June 1987
- Recorded: 1986–1987
- Studio: Abbey Road Studios, London
- Genre: New wave; synth-pop; art pop
- Length: 43:52
- Label: E.G.
- Producer: Mike Hedges

Toyah chronology
Minx (1985)	Desire (1987)	Prostitute (1988)

Singles from Desire
- 1. "Echo Beach" Released: April 1987; 2. "Moonlight Dancing" Released: 1987

Desire is the second solo studio album by English singer Toyah Willcox, released in 1987 by E.G. Records.

== Background ==
Musically, Desire is more typical of Willcox's band's earlier albums rather than its more commercial predecessor Minx. Most of the songs are once again co-written by Willcox, and while the original release of the album does not feature any musician credits, it features a consistent band line-up, rather than the large number of session musicians involved in Minx. Robert Fripp and Ronnie Wood play on the album but are uncredited. The album features two cover versions: "Echo Beach", originally recorded by Martha and the Muffins, and "Love's Unkind", originally by Donna Summer. Willcox stated that she was forced to record "Love's Unkind" by her record label, even though she was fiercely opposed to it. E.G. Records threatened to cancel the album's release if she did not. The cover photos were taken by Carrie Branovan.

The lead single, "Echo Beach", became a minor hit in the UK. The second and final single was "Moonlight Dancing", a song about an idea that "the moon is a connection that puts us all together", which contains lyrics from a re-recorded version of "Dawn Chorus". The single failed to chart. The album itself was not a commercial success either and did not enter the album sales chart in the UK. Desire was reissued digitally in 2015.

== Track listing ==
Side one

1. "Echo Beach" (Mark Gane) – 3:23
2. "Moonlight Dancing" (Toyah Willcox, Joel Bogen, Nick Graham) – 4:13
3. "Revive the World" (Willcox, Tony Geballe) – 3:28
4. "The View" (Willcox, Adrian Lee) – 3:45
5. "Moon Migration" (Willcox, Bruce Woolley) – 5:37

Side two

6. "Love's Unkind" (Donna Summer, Giorgio Moroder, Pete Bellotte) – 3:11
7. "Dear Diary" (Willcox, Simon Darlow) – 4:03
8. "Deadly as a Woman" (Willcox, Graham) – 4:00
9. "Goodbye Baby" (Willcox, Graham, Darlow) – 3:37
10. "When a Woman Cries" (Willcox) – 4:31
11. "Desire" (Willcox, Robert Fripp) – 4:04

Digital edition bonus tracks

12. "Echo Beach" (Surf Mix) (Gane) – 5:42
13. "Plenty" (Willcox) – 3:44
14. "Sun Up" (Willcox) – 2:56
15. "Re-Entry into Dance" (Willcox, Geballe) – 4:25
16. "Mesmerised" (Willcox, Graham) – 4:08

== Personnel ==
- Toyah Willcox – vocals
- Robert Fripp – guitar (uncredited)
- Ronnie Wood – guitar on track 7 (uncredited)

Production

- Mike Hedges – producer, mixing
- Haydn Bendall – engineer, mixing
- Gareth Cousins – assistant engineer
- The Quick – mixing on track 1
- John Porter – mixing on track 6
- Carrie Branovan – photography
- Ken O'Rourke – hair stylist
