= Mystery Walk =

Studio album by Martha and the Muffins
- Released: February 1984
- Recorded: Autumn/Winter, 1983
- Genre: Pop
- Label: Current/RCA
- Producer: Daniel Lanois, Mark Gane, Martha Johnson

Martha and the Muffins chronology
Danseparc (1983)	Mystery Walk (1984)	The World Is a Ball (1986)

Singles from Mystery Walk
- 1. "Black Stations/White Stations" Released: February 1984; 2. "Cooling the Medium" Released: August 1984

Professional ratings
Review scores
Source	Rating
Allmusic	4.5/5 stars

Mystery Walk is a 1984 album by M + M (also known as Martha And The Muffins), produced by Daniel Lanois. The opening tracks, "Black Stations/White Stations" and "Cooling The Medium" were both released as singles, with the first track being the more successful of the two, achieving hit status in Canada and reaching #2 on the U.S. dance music chart.

A 30th anniversary CD and digital download edition of the album (remastered by Peter J. Moore) containing additional bonus tracks was released through the band's Muffin Music imprint in 2014.

== Track listing ==
1. "Black Stations/White Stations"
2. "Cooling the Medium"
3. "Come Out and Dance"
4. "I Start to Stop"
5. "Big Trees"
6. "In Between Sleep and Reason"
7. "Garden in the Sky"
8. "Nation of Followers"
9. "Alibi Room"
10. "Rhythm of Life"

== Personnel ==
- Martha Johnson - guitar, keyboards, vocals
- Mark Gane - guitar, keyboards, vocals
- Daniel Lanois - guitar, pedal steel, treatments
- Dave Piltch - bass
- Eluriel Tinker - bass
- Yogi Horton - drums
- Fred Maher - drums
- Martin Deller - percussion
- Dick Smith - percussion
- Randy Brecker, Michael Brecker, Wayne Smith - horns
- Rufus Cappdocia - cello
- Julie Masi, Brian Patti, Shawne Jackson, Sharon Lee Williams - background vocals
