= Then Again =

Then Again may refer to:

- Then Again (Paul Haig album)
- Then Again (John Farnham album)
- Then Again (Henry Now album)
- Then Again..., a compilation album by Colin James
- Then Again: A Retrospective, a compilation album by Martha and the Muffins
- "Then Again" (song), a single by Alabama
