= Here Is What Is =

Studio album by Daniel Lanois
- Released: December 15, 2007
- Recorded: Toronto, Ontario, Canada
- Genre: Rock
- Length: 64 Minutes
- Label: Red Floor Records
- Producer: Daniel Lanois

Daniel Lanois chronology
Belladonna (2005)	Here Is What Is (2007)	Omni Series (2008)

Professional ratings
Aggregate scores
Source	Rating
Metacritic	71/100
Review scores
Source	Rating
AllMusic	2.5/5 stars
Filter	80%
Mojo	4/5 stars
Now	4/5 stars
PopMatters	8/10
Q	3/5 stars
Uncut	6/10

Here Is What Is is the fifth studio album by Canadian songwriter and record producer Daniel Lanois. It was first released on December 15, 2007, through Red Floor Records as a high-quality download, and later released on CD on March 18, 2008.

The album is the result of the same project that led to the 2007 documentary "Here Is What Is" that premiered at the 2007 Toronto International Film Festival in September. The movie documents the aesthetics and creative process behind Lanois' approach to music making and recording. The album has been presented as a direct soundtrack to this film, and some of the tracks ("Beauty" and "Chest of Drawers") are conversations with Brian Eno.

== Track listing ==
All songs written by Daniel Lanois unless otherwise noted.

1. "Chest of Drawers"
2. "Where Will I Be"
3. "Here Is What Is"
4. "Not Fighting Anymore"
5. "Beauty"
6. "Blue Bus"
7. "Lovechild"
8. "Harry"
9. "Bells"
10. "This May Be The Last Time"
11. "Smoke #6"
12. "I Like That"
13. "Duo Glide"
14. "Bladesteel"
15. "Moondog"
16. "Sacred and Secular"
17. "Joy"
18. "Luna Samba"

"Where Will I Be" is a new version of a song which had been previously released on Emmylou Harris' album Wrecking Ball in 1995.

The tracks "Lovechild" and "Sacred and Secular" respectively incorporate the pedal steel guitar melody used on "Carla", from the Belladonna album, and the guitar melody used on "Transmitter", from the Shine album.

== Personnel ==
- Daniel Lanois – guitar, bass, vocals
- Brian Blade – drums
- Garth Hudson – keyboards
- Jim Wilson
- Daryl Johnson
- Tony Mangurian
- Tony Garnier
- Marcus Blake
- Steven Nistor – drums
- Ada Small
- Shawn Stroope
- Willie Green
- Aaron Embry
- Brady Blade
