= Trance and Dance =

Studio album by Martha and the Muffins
- Released: September 1980
- Recorded: July 1980, Manor Studios; "About Insomnia" recorded at The Townhouse Studios
- Genres: New wave; art punk
- Label: Dindisc/Virgin Records
- Producer: Mike Howlett

Martha and the Muffins chronology
Metro Music (1979)	Trance and Dance (1980)	This Is the Ice Age (1981)

Singles from Trance and Dance
- 1. "About Insomnia" Released: July 1980; 2. "Suburban Dream" Released: September 1980; 3. "Was Ezo" Released: November 1980

Professional ratings
Review scores
Source	Rating
Allmusic	3/5 stars

Trance and Dance (Dindisc LP, VL 2207) was Martha and the Muffins' 1980 second album, and like the previous Metro Music was produced by Mike Howlett. The album included "Motorbikin’", the band's cover of Chris Spedding's 1976 UK hit.

Initial editions were released with a bonus 4-track EP of live recordings.

Part of Trance And Dance was later released (along with Metro Music in its entirety and two tracks from the later This is the Ice Age album) on the 1987 semi-compilation Far Away in Time.

A freshly remastered and expanded edition of Trance And Dance was issued on CD in 2013 by Cherry Red Records (CDMRED 584) in the UK. This edition includes the complete original album, the original bonus 4-track EP of live recordings, along with two b-sides: "Girl Fat" which had appeared on the "Suburban Dream" single, and "1 4 6" which is taken from the "About Insomnia" single. All tracks were remastered in Toronto by Peter J. Moore under the band's supervision. A 15-page colour booklet features song lyrics, photos of the band and of various album-related artifacts, the band's complete UK discography, and new liner notes written by founding and current band member, Mark Gane.

== Track listing ==
No.	Title	Writer(s)	Length
1.	"Luna Park"	Mark Gane	3:11
2.	"Suburban Dream"	Gane	3:27
3.	"Was Ezo"	Martha Ladly	4:00
4.	"Teddy the Dink"	Gane, Brian Harvey	3:27
5.	"Symptomatic Love"	Martha Johnson, Andy Haas	4:08
6.	"Primal Weekend"	Haas, Gane, Ladly	5:10
7.	"Halfway Through the Week"	Gane	3:40
8.	"Am I On?"	Johnson	3:24
9.	"Motorbikin'"	Chris Spedding	2:55
10.	"About Insomnia"	Gane, Ladly	3:10
11.	"Be Blasé"	Gane	2:39
12.	"Trance and Dance"	Johnson	7:14

1980 Tour Live EP 7"
No.	Title	Length
1.	"Indecision"
2.	"Cheesies and Gum"
3.	"Primal Weekend"
4.	"Paint By Number Heart"

2013 Remastered & Expanded Edition (Issued by Cherry Red Records - CDMRED 584)
No.	Title	Writer(s)	Length
1.	"Luna Park"	Mark Gane	3:11
2.	"Suburban Dream"	Gane	3:27
3.	"Was Ezo"	Martha Ladly	4:00
4.	"Teddy the Dink"	Gane	3:27
5.	"Symptomatic Love"	Martha Johnson, Andy Haas	4:08
6.	"Primal Weekend"	Haas, Gane, Ladly	5:10
7.	"Halfway Through the Week"	Gane	3:40
8.	"Am I On?"	Johnson	3:24
9.	"Motorbikin'"	Chris Spedding	2:55
10.	"About Insomnia"	Gane, Ladly	3:10
11.	"Be Blasé"	Gane	2:39
12.	"Trance and Dance"	Johnson	7:14
13.	"Indecision (Live)"	Johnson	4:13
14.	"Cheesies and Gum (Live)"	Gane, Ladly	3:17
15.	"Primal Weekend (Live)"	Gane, Haas, Ladly	4:18
16.	"Paint By Number Heart (Live)"	Johnson	4:41
17.	"Girl Fat"	Carl Finkle, M Gane, Tim Gane, Haas, Johnson, Ladly	4:02
18.	"1 4 6"	Finkle, M Gane, T Gane, Haas, Johnson, Ladly	4:46

== Personnel ==
- Carl Finkle – bass
- Mark Gane – guitars, vocals, synthetics
- Tim Gane – drums, percussion
- Martha Johnson – vocals, keyboards
- Martha Ladly – vocals, keyboards, trombone
- Andy Haas – saxophone
- David Millar – live sound

=== Production credits ===
- Produced by Mike Howlett
- Engineered by Richard Manwaring
- Tape op. – Howard Gray
- Cover concept – Martha and the Muffins
- Cover painting – Martha Ladly
- Art direction – Peter Saville
- 2013 Remastered & Expanded Edition: Remastering – Peter J. Moore
