= It's Not Funny Anymore =

It's Not Funny Anymore may refer to:

- "It's Not Funny Anymore", a song by Hüsker Dü from the 1983 EP Metal Circus
- "It's Not Funny Anymore", a song by Crash Vegas from the 1989 album Red Earth
