= Robert Fresco (cinematographer) =

Canadian cinematographer and documentary filmmaker

Robert Fresco (born 1943) is a Canadian cinematographer and documentary filmmaker. He is most noted for his 1981 documentary film Steady as She Goes, for which he won the Bijou Award for Best Cinematography in a Documentary and was nominated for Best Director of a Documentary, and as a Juno Award nominee for Video of the Year at the Juno Awards of 1984 for his video for The Parachute Club's "Rise Up".

His other documentary films have included Mudflats Living, The Salvage Prince, Easter in Iglooik: Peter's Story and Love, Hope and Autism, and as a music video director he also did noteworthy work for Martha and the Muffins, including the videos for "Black Stations/White Stations" and "Cooling the Medium". As a cinematographer his credits have included the films Winter Kept Us Warm, Heavy Horse Pull, Firebird 2015 AD, Poetry in Motion, Comic Book Confidential, Nightstick, Wisecracks, The Twist, My Own Private Oshawa and Grass, and episodes of The Twilight Zone, The Campbells and Exhibit A: Secrets of Forensic Science. He won a Gemini Award for Best Photography in an Information Program or Series at the 16th Gemini Awards in 2001 for his work on the Exhibit A episode "Beauty Shop Bandit".

He has also been a partner in Gloo Studios, a firm that produced short comedy videos and special effects work for collegehumor.com.
