= Belladonna (album) =

Studio album by Daniel Lanois
- Released: July 12, 2005
- Recorded: Toronto, Canada
- Genres: Ambient, experimental
- Length: 36:46
- Label: Anti-
- Producer: Daniel Lanois

Daniel Lanois chronology
Rockets (2004)	Belladonna (2005)	Here Is What Is (2007)

Belladonna is an all-instrumental album of ambient and experimental music by Canadian singer-songwriter and producer Daniel Lanois. It was released in 2005 through Anti- and features Lanois on the pedal steel guitar.

One track on the album, "The Deadly Nightshade", had earlier been released on a 1996 album by Geoffrey Oryema as "LPJ Christine", although the version on Belladonna is without Oryema's vocals.

== Reception ==
Professional ratings
Aggregate scores
Source	Rating
Metacritic	66/100
Review scores
Source	Rating
All About Jazz	4.5/5 stars
AllMusic	3.5/5 stars
Entertainment Weekly	B
Mojo	3.5/5 stars
Pitchfork	3.8/10
PopMatters	8/10
Q	2/5 stars
Rolling Stone	2/5 stars
Stylus	B
Uncut	4/10

Billboard said that Lanois "returns to a cinematic beauty that serenely kindles the imagination".

== Track listing ==
1. "Two Worlds" - 2:03
2. "Sketches" - 4:24
3. "Oaxaca" - 2:50
4. "Agave" - 1:59
5. "Telco" - 3:34
6. "Desert Rose" - 1:52
7. "Carla" - 2:02
8. "The Deadly Nightshade" - 4:06
9. "Dusty" - 1:39
10. "Frozen" - 3:17
11. "Panorama" - 3:01
12. "Flametop Green" - 2:27
13. "Todos Santos" - 5:32

== Personnel ==
- Daniel Lanois - pedal steel guitar
- Malcolm Burn - keyboards, guitar
- Aaron Embry - piano, guitar
- Brad Mehldau - piano
- Bill Dillon - guitar
- Daryl Johnson - bass
- Brian Blade - drums
- Victor Indrizzo - drums
- Gilbert Castellanos - trumpet
- Michael Dessen - trombone
- Adam Samuels - audio mixer
