= A Gathering of the Tribes =

1990 music and culture event in California

A Gathering of the Tribes was a two-day music and culture festival organized by Ian Astbury and promoter Bill Graham, held in California in October 1990. It is considered the precursor to the Lollapalooza touring festivals of the 1990s, an opinion shared by Astbury himself. The festival was held at the Shoreline Amphitheatre in Mountain View on October 6 and the Pacific Amphitheatre in Costa Mesa on October 7. The event was intended to raise money for and awareness of Native-American-related causes. A performance by the American Indian Dance Theatre preceded the festival each day. The concert grounds also hosted tents for Act Up, Amnesty International, Greenpeace, Rock the Vote, and local animal rights organizations.

The artists featured were Soundgarden, Ice-T, Indigo Girls, Queen Latifah, Joan Baez, Steve Jones, Michelle Shocked, Iggy Pop, The Cramps, London Quireboys, The Mission UK and Public Enemy. The Los Angeles Times music critic described Canadian band Crash Vegas and UK band The Charlatans UK as the festival's "least-known performers", both deserving "fuller hearings in more intimate surroundings". Iggy Pop's performance was described as "restrained" compared to his typical "combustive live" performances. According to Astbury, the diversity of bands demonstrated that "us and them doesn't exist any more".

Because of violence at previous Public Enemy concerts, Public Enemy did not appear on the bill for the concert in Costa Mesa. When addressing the crowd, Ice-T, Queen Latifah, and Astbury all stated that Public Enemy was not at the festival owing to "pressure from local authorities", a claim denied by the Costa Mesa police chief. A show organizer stated that Public Enemy did not appear because of a scheduling conflict. Lenny Kravitz, also on the bill, did not perform that day. Astbury had wanted other performers to be part of the program, including Guns N' Roses, Tracy Chapman, Living Colour, Ziggy Marley, and Julian Lennon, but they could not participate because of previous commitments. He also excluded his own band, The Cult, from performing because he "didn't want people to think we were using this to boost our career".

Both concerts sold out, with over 10,000 attendees for each, but Astbury lost around $50,000 on the festival. Some of the tents for the advocacy groups drew long lineups from attendees, who signed up to support the causes.

A Gathering of the Tribes was revisited in 1991 but this time as a traveling festival that was to visit multiple venues, with a bill featuring X, Fishbone, Steve Earle, EPMD, Hoodoo Gurus, Primus, and King's X, among others. However, this version of the tour was a financial failure and was cancelled before all the dates could be completed.

== Inspiration ==
Astbury was inspired to start A Gathering of the Tribes after having dinner with a Native American man whom he met in North Dakota while on a 1989 tour with Metallica. The man told Astbury that he was planning to study resource management at college in order to help purify his tribe's drinking water, then asked Astbury what he was doing for his community. Astbury had no answer for the man, then began to think about running a music festival. It led to the creation of a music festival "of contrasting stylists ranging from hard rock to folk to rap", because he wanted to oppose the musical and racial segregation prominent in pop music at the time. Astbury had considered hosting the concert in Monterey, as he had been interested in the 1967 Monterey Pop Festival.
