= Heavy Horse Pull =

- Directed by: Roberta King; Ronald Squire
- Produced by: Beryl Fox; Roberta King; Ronald Squire
- Cinematography: Robert Fresco
- Edited by: Roger Pyke
- Music by: Prairie Oyster
- Production company: National Film Board of Canada
- Release date: June 28, 1978
- Running time: 15 minutes
- Country: Canada

Heavy Horse Pull is a Canadian short documentary film, directed by Roberta King and Ronald Squire and released in 1978. The film is a depiction of farmers participating in heavy horse pull competitions at county fairs in rural Ontario farming communities such as Kinmount, Lindsay and Bancroft.

The film includes music composed and performed by the then relatively unknown country band Prairie Oyster.

The film was first screened in 1978 as part of a special Canada Day screening series of Canadian films staged by the National Film Board of Canada. It received wider attention in 1980, when it was selected to screen as an opener to the theatrical feature film Brubaker.

The film was a Genie Award nominee for Best Theatrical Short Film at the 2nd Genie Awards in 1981.
