= Acadie (album) =

- Original cover art by Lynn Goldsmith

Studio album by Daniel Lanois
- Released: September 26, 1989; June 14, 2005
- Recorded: 1989
- Studio: Wilderness, Woodbridge, Suffolk; STS, Dublin, Ireland; Grant Avenue, Hamilton, Ontario
- Genre: Rock
- Length: 41:03
- Label: Opal/Warner Bros.
- Producer: Daniel Lanois

Daniel Lanois chronology
Acadie (1989)	For the Beauty of Wynona (1993)

Alternative cover
- 2005 reissue cover art

Professional ratings
Review scores
Source	Rating
AllMusic	4/5 stars
The Boston Phoenix	3.5/4 stars
Chicago Sun-Times	3.5/4 stars
Chicago Tribune	3.5/4 stars
DownBeat	4/5 stars
Los Angeles Times	3/5 stars
NME	7/10
Q	4/5 stars
The Rolling Stone Album Guide	3/5 stars
The Village Voice	B−

Acadie is the debut studio album by record producer and singer-songwriter Daniel Lanois, originally released in 1989 by Opal Records and Warner Bros. Records. It was largely written and recorded in the city of New Orleans. Lanois sings on it in both French and English, sometimes on the same track. It was reissued in 2005 with new cover art (but otherwise identical to the original) and then issued again in 2021 as Acadie (Gold Top Edition) and only the 2021 edition is available for streaming. Acadie was named the 20th greatest Canadian album of all time in Bob Mersereau's 2007 book The Top 100 Canadian Albums.

== Track listing ==
All tracks written by Daniel Lanois unless otherwise noted.

1. "Still Water" – 4:29
2. "The Maker" – 4:13
3. "O Marie" – 3:13
4. "Jolie Louise" – 2:41
5. "Fisherman's Daughter" – 2:47
6. "White Mustang II" (Lanois, Brian Eno) – 2:54
7. "Under a Stormy Sky" – 2:20
8. "Where the Hawkwind Kills" – 3:51
9. "Silium's Hill" – 3:00
10. "Ice" – 4:26
11. "St. Ann's Gold" (Malcolm Burn, Lanois) – 3:31
12. "Amazing Grace" (Traditional, arranged by Lanois, John Newton) – 3:47

With some more songs on the 2005 reissue;

1. "The Maker" (Early bass and lyrics)
2. "The Maker" (Calypso demo)
3. "Still Water" (From Eno's House)
4. "Jolie Louise" (Before Dublin)
5. "Early Dourado Sketch"
6. "The Source of Fisherman's Daughter" (Instrumental version)

"Jolie Louise", "Still Water" and "The Maker" were released as singles.

== Personnel ==
- Daniel Lanois – guitar (steel, electric and acoustic), bass, vocals, omnichord
- Malcolm Burn – keyboards, guitars, backing vocals
- Brian Eno – keyboards, vocals
- Tony Hall – bass
- Willie Green – drums

Additional personnel

- Adam Clayton – bass on "Still Water" and "Jolie Louise"
- Larry Mullen, Jr. – drums on "Still Water" and "Jolie Louise"
- Pierre Marchand – keyboards
- Mason Ruffner – guitar on "Under a Stormy Sky"
- Roger Eno – piano and synth on "St Ann's Gold"
- Ed Roth – accordion
- James May – trumpet on "White Mustang II"
- Cyril Neville – percussion
- Art Neville – piano
- Aaron Neville – backing vocals on "The Maker" and vocals on" Amazing Grace"
- Bill Dillon – guitar

Technical

- Mark Howard – recording, mixing
- Malcolm Burn – recording, mixing, music consultant
- Brian Eno, Paul Barrett – additional recording
- Lynn Goldsmith – front cover photography

== Charts ==
=== Album ===
Year	Chart	Position
1990	Billboard 200	166
