= Modern Lullaby =

Studio album by Martha and the Muffins
- Released: 1992
- Recorded: 1988–1991
- Genre: Pop
- Length: 40:24
- Label: Intrepid
- Producers: Mark Gane, Martha Johnson

Martha and the Muffins chronology
| Far Away in Time (1987) | Modern Lullaby (1992) | Then Again: A Retrospective (1998) |

Modern Lullaby is an album by the Canadian band Martha and the Muffins, released in 1992. Although released under the band's original name, only Martha Johnson and Mark Gane remained following the original band's breakup.

No singles were released from the album, though the track "Rainbow Sign" was promoted to radio, and videos were produced for "Rainbow Sign", "Everybody Has A Place" and "Fighting the Monster". The album was a commercial disappointment.

== Critical reception ==
Professional ratings
Review scores
| Source | Rating |
|---|---|
| AllMusic | 4.5/5 stars |

The Edmonton Journal wrote: "Dusting their lean, insistent beat and Johnson's unadorned drama with sweet swirls of violin, this outfit proves that there were, and still are, poetic ways to make commercial dance music."

== Track listing ==
All tracks are written by Mark Gane and Martha Johnson.

| No. | Title | Length |
|---|---|---|
| 1. | "To Dream About You" | 4:00 |
| 2. | "Fighting the Monster" | 3:15 |
| 3. | "Rainbow Sign" | 4:19 |
| 4. | "Modern Lullaby" | 3:26 |
| 5. | "Paradise" | 4:07 |
| 6. | "The Looking Time" | 2:23 |
| 7. | "Birdcage Walk" | 3:26 |
| 8. | "Everybody Has a Place" | 3:21 |
| 9. | "Show Me Your Magic" | 4:03 |
| 10. | "Million Dollars" | 4:42 |
| 11. | "Where Blue Meets Green" | 3:22 |

== Personnel ==
- Martha Johnson – guitar, keyboards, vocals
- Mark Gane – guitar, keyboards, vocals
- David Piltch – bass
- Stuart Gordon – violin
- Michael Sloski – percussion
- Tim Gane – percussion

== Recording ==
- Recorded at The Web in Bath, England, and Toronto, Canada (1988-1991)
- Mixed at Winfield Sound, Toronto
- Mixing Engineer – Earl Torno, assisted by Eric Apps
- Mastered by Peter J. Moore
