= Rocco DeLuca =

American musician

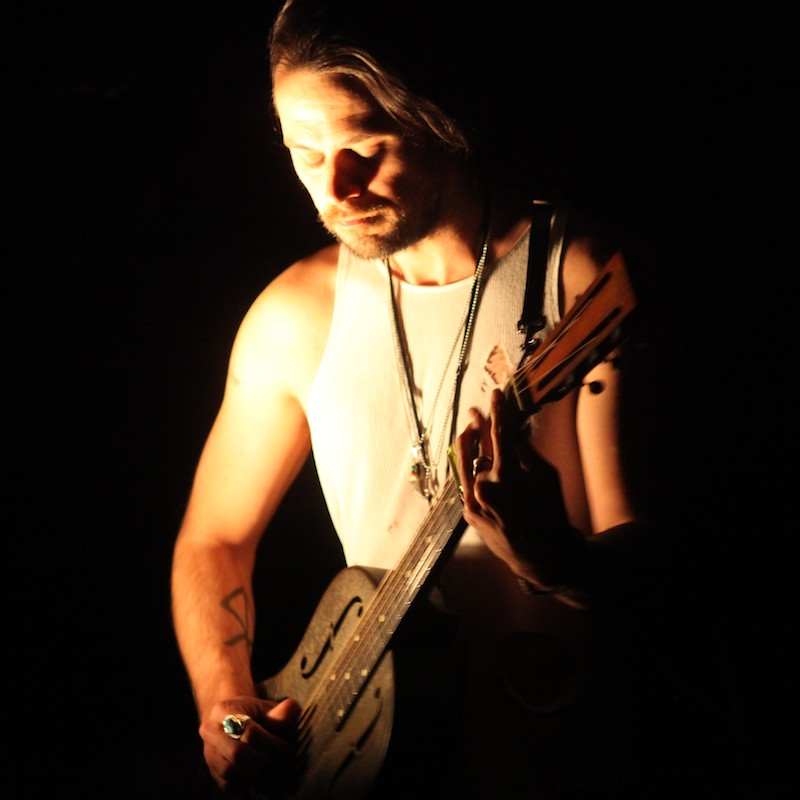
- Rocco DeLuca at the Commodore Ballroom, February 2011

Background information
- Born: December 27, 1974 (age 51)
- Origin: Long Beach, California, United States
- Genres: Ambient; Indie rock; Soul; Blues; Folk
- Years active: 2005–present
- Label: 429 Records (USA)
- Website: www.roccodeluca.com

Rocco DeLuca (born December 27, 1974) is a California-based folk, soul and blues musician who came to prominence as the lead singer of the four-piece band Rocco DeLuca and the Burden. Since 2009, DeLuca has toured and recorded as a solo artist.

== Early life ==
From a young age, he displayed a deep passion for music, inspired by his father and uncle's soulful playing. DeLuca's journey into music began with self-taught distinctive approach to songwriting.

== Career ==
DeLuca is known for his use of the Dobro, a particular design of resonator guitar. He began his career as a solo artist, opening for acts including Taj Mahal, John Mayer and John Lee Hooker, and has had the opportunity to play with Johnny Cash. From 2003 to 2006, he regularly played at Gypsy Lounge in Lake Forest, California. Starting in 2005, when DeLuca was signed by the independent record label Ironworks, he led the band Rocco DeLuca and the Burden until 2009. After the band's last performances, DeLuca continued as a solo artist as well as working on projects with Slash and Robbie Robertson. During his career, he has played with various legends such as Hooker, Cash, and Daniel Lanois.

Upon meeting DeLuca, Lanois described him as follows: "My initial meeting with Rocco [...] was pure and centered and seemed to have a sense of purpose, and I felt that there was something burning in his heart that I could be helpful to. It had that kind of truth in it that I decided to run with. I like the street corner aspect of working with Rocco, it woke up a certain part of my renegade ways I'm trying to keep alive these days. I fully believe in DeLuca. I think that he's got the power to be a contemporary troubadour, as I see it, and I hope I can be his friend for a long time, whether I am operating in the same limelight, ahead of him, behind him, in his shadow, whatever it takes, I'll be there. The one thing that I love about Rocco DeLuca is he is driven by his own heart."

== Rocco DeLuca and the Burden ==
From 2005 to 2009, DeLuca was lead singer and guitarist for the band Rocco DeLuca and the Burden, as well as writer of the majority of the band's material. On top of his resonator guitar, he also played glockenspiel, piano, organ, and banjo in the studio recordings. Long-time friend Ryan Carman played the drums, glockenspiel, cajón, and bells among other percussion instruments. Original percussionist Greg Velasquez has also been credited for keyboards, and original bassist David Beste has been credited for glockenspiel, piano and organ. Producer Daniel Lanois was credited for electric piano, electric guitar, strings, percussion, pedal steel, lowery, and piano on the album Mercy. For live performances of 2007 tours, the band featured Brett Bixby on keyboards, guitar, and backing vocals.

=== 2005-07: I Trust You to Kill Me album and documentary ===
The band's debut album, I Trust You to Kill Me, was released on CD on March 21, 2006, on the Ironworks label. The album was produced by Jude Cole, mixed by Florian Ammon (except for tracks 2, 7 and 10 which were mixed by Dave Reed), and engineered by Florian Ammon and Dave Reed. Coinciding with the release of the album, the band released a behind-the-scenes documentary under the same title. Public screenings of the film were held in New York City, West Hollywood, and San Francisco in September 2006.

Actor Kiefer Sutherland, co-owner of Ironworks with Jude Cole, offered support as the band's tour promoter and manager, as well as helping to produce the documentary. Sutherland is also featured in the film, most famously for an incident in which he dove full-body into a decorated Christmas tree. In May 2006, the band and Sutherland traveled to the United Kingdom to promote their new release by playing some live shows. In the summer of 2007, the band also opened for English band Keane's Under the Iron Sea Tour in North America.

The band appeared on several TV shows, such as Jimmy Kimmel Live!, The Tonight Show with Jay Leno, the Late Show with David Letterman, The Late Late Show with Craig Ferguson, Friday Night with Jonathan Ross, Kastljós in Iceland, and Top of the Pops in the UK on May 22, 2006.

=== 2008-09: Mercy ===
On March 10, 2009, Rocco DeLuca and the Burden released their second full-length album, entitled Mercy. To produce the album, DeLuca chose to work with Lanois, who had produced a number of albums for rock band U2, including The Joshua Tree, Achtung Baby, and All That You Can't Leave Behind, as well as other artists like Brian Eno, Peter Gabriel, and Bob Dylan. Lanois has many times made guest appearances with him on stage.

== Solo career ==
=== 2010–2013: Solo touring and Drugs 'N Hymns ===
He participated as a guest artist on the 13 cut of the album Slash, interpreting the theme Saint Is A Sinner Too.

DeLuca began touring as a solo artist, continuing to hone a raw, confessional, bluesy sound. No longer with the band, he parted ways with Ironworks and signed with 429 Records in December 2011. On March 6, 2012, 429 Records released DeLuca's third full-length and first solo album, Drugs 'N Hymns. The album was a decidedly different sound from his first two albums, featuring sparse production and a brooding, ethereal tone.

=== 2014–present: Rocco DeLuca ===
On August 19, 2014, DeLuca released his self-titled fourth album, his second for 429 Records. Once again produced by Daniel Lanois, the album found DeLuca returning to the more stripped-down sound of Drugs 'N Hymns and building upon it. To craft the album, DeLuca invited a number of local California musicians to his home to record sessions in his bedroom. He toured the United States until November of that year. Goodbye To Language was released on September 9, 2016. DeLuca joined forces with Lanois once again to create Goodbye To Language. Constructed entirely from the sounds of steel guitars, DeLuca and Lanois contribute a compositional rigor that recalls the 20th century dreamscapes of Ravel and Debussy, with a sense of sonic futurism and yet also with the naturalness that can only come from artists rooted in centuries of grassroots music. Uncut Magazine featured Goodbye To Language as one of the best albums of 2016. Robert Plant selected Satie as one of his favorite pieces from Goodbye To Language for his Golden Gods compilation.

== Other works and appearances ==
After Mercy, DeLuca appeared on Slash's self-titled solo album singing on "Saint is a Sinner Too".

DeLuca also collaborated with Daniel Lanois and a myriad of others at Lakeshore Records to produce the soundtrack release of Red Dead Redemption 2, in which DeLuca was credited for "Crash of Worlds". He also wrote "That's the Way it is" and co-wrote "Unshaken". While the full album was released on July 12, 2019, DeLuca's song "Crash of Worlds" and one of Lanois' songs, "Table Top", were released early to promote the upcoming release.

== Popular culture ==
The song "Feather and Knife" was featured in the sixth episode of the 2018 Australian TV series Mystery Road. The song "Swing Low" was featured in episode 9 of season 4 of Rescue Me. The song "When You Learn To Sing" was featured in episode 4 of season 1 of Parenthood. The song "Congregate" was featured in episode 3 of season 10 of Criminal Minds. The song "Gravitate" was featured in the 2007 K-Swiss commercial campaign starring Anna Kournikova. The song "Save Yourself" was featured in the 2010 Harley-Davidson commercial campaign.

== Discography ==
=== Albums ===
- I Trust You to Kill Me (2006)
- Mercy (2009)
- Field Recordings (2010) (sold exclusively at live performances)
- Drugs 'N Hymns (2012)
- Rocco DeLuca (2014)
- Goodbye to Language (2016) (with Daniel Lanois)
- Live off the Floor (2018)
- Heavy Sun (2021) (with Daniel Lanois, Johnny Shepherd & Jim Wilson)

=== Singles ===
- "Colorful"
- "Save Yourself"
- "Open Pages"
- "Saint is a Sinner Too" - Slash ft. Rocco DeLuca
- "Liberation"

=== DVD ===
- I Trust You to Kill Me (2006)

== Chart information ==
Year	Album / Single	Peak Chart Position			
Year	Album / Single	Billboard 200	Top Heatseekers	Independent Albums	Folk Albums
2006	I Trust You to Kill Me	177	5	12	-
2009	Mercy	123	2	-	-
2012	Drugs 'N Hymns	-	-	-	22
2014	Rocco DeLuca	-	-	-	-
