= Rockets (Daniel Lanois album) =

Compilation album by Daniel Lanois
- Released: 2004
- Recorded: Toronto, Canada
- Genre: Rock
- Length: 37:21
- Label: Daniellanois.com
- Producer: Daniel Lanois

Daniel Lanois chronology
| Shine (2003) | Rockets (2004) | Belladonna (2005) |

Professional ratings
Review scores
| Source | Rating |
|---|---|
| AllMusic | 2.5/5 stars |

Rockets is the first compilation album Canadian record producer and songwriter Daniel Lanois. It was self-released in 2004, and consists of a collection of unreleased demos, live and rehearsal tracks, and leftovers. It was created as a "renegade CD" to be sold only at gigs and on Daniel Lanois' website.

== Track listing ==
1. "Power of One" - 3:43
2. "Sweet Soul Honey" - 4:13
3. "JJ Leaves L.A." - 3:30
4. "Sometimes" - 2:32
5. "Rockets" - 4:38
6. "Devil's Bed" - 2:11
7. "The Maker" - 5:35
8. "Panorama" - 4:15
9. "Stormy Sky" (with Emmylou Harris and Willie Nelson) - 2:42
10. "Space Kay" - 4:02
