= For the Beauty of Wynona =

- Cover art by Jan Saudek

Studio album by Daniel Lanois
- Released: March 23, 1993
- Recorded: 1991–1993
- Studio: Real World Bath, Somerset, England; TakLab, Paris, France; Dog Town, Dublin, Ireland; Grant Avenue Studio, Ontario, Canada; Kingsway Studios, New Orleans, Louisiana
- Genre: Rock; experimental rock
- Length: 55:42
- Label: Warner Bros.
- Producer: Daniel Lanois

Daniel Lanois chronology
Acadie (1989)	For the Beauty of Wynona (1993)	Shine (2003)

Singles from For the Beauty of Wynona
- 1. "Lotta Love to Give" / "The Messenger" Released: April 1993

Alternative cover
- American edition (censored) cover

For the Beauty of Wynona is the second album by Canadian songwriter and record producer Daniel Lanois. It was released on March 23, 1993.

The album cover photograph, titled "The Knife", was taken in 1987 by Czech artist Jan Saudek. The image was censored upon release in the United States.

== Critical reception ==
Professional ratings
Review scores
Source	Rating
AllMusic	4/5 stars
The Encyclopedia of Popular Music	3/5 stars
Entertainment Weekly	B

The Los Angeles Times called the album "a work of considerable imagination and force." Trouser Press wrote that it trades "increased accessibility for diminished depth."

== Track listing ==
All songs written by Daniel Lanois; unless otherwise noted.

No.	Title	Writers	Length
1.	"The Messenger"		5:27
2.	"Brother L.A."		4:19
3.	"Still Learning How to Crawl"	Lanois, Daryl Johnson	5:19
4.	"Beatrice"		4:21
5.	"Waiting"		2:00
6.	"The Collection of Marie Claire"		4:17
7.	"Death of a Train"		5:47
8.	"The Unbreakable Chain"		4:19
9.	"Lotta Love to Give"		3:38
10.	"Indian Red"	George Landry	3:46
11.	"Sleeping in the Devil's Bed"		3:02
12.	"For the Beauty of Wynona"		5:50
13.	"Rocky World"		2:55

"The Messenger" and "Lotta Love to Give" were released as singles. "Sleeping in the Devil's Bed" had been previously released on the soundtrack Until the End of the World (released December 10, 1991).

== Personnel ==
- Daniel Lanois – guitar, bass, vocals
- Malcolm Burn – guitar, keyboards
- Bill Dillon – guitar, mandolin, Guitorgan M300
- Daryl Johnson– bass, percussion, drums, vocals
- Ronald Jones – drums
- Nicholas Payton – trumpet
- Emmanuel del Casal – bass on "Brother L. A."
- Sean Devitt – percussion on "For the Beauty of Wynona"
