= Heavy Sun =

Studio album by Daniel Lanois
- Released: March 19, 2021
- Length: 41:52
- Label: Maker Series

Daniel Lanois chronology
Venetian Snares x Daniel Lanois (2018)	Heavy Sun (2021)

Heavy Sun is the seventh studio album by Canadian songwriter and producer Daniel Lanois. It was released on March 19, 2021, through Lanois' own label Maker Series.

== Background ==
The album was recorded in Los Angeles, USA and Toronto, Canada in March 2020 prior to the COVID-19 pandemic. The album was recorded and mixed by Daniel Lanois and Wayne Lorenz and mastered by Noah Mintz.

== Release ==
On October 29, 2020, Lanois revealed he was releasing his next solo studio album, following from his 2016 release Goodbye to Language. Lanois said of the album: "We want to lift people's spirits with this music. It's so easy to feel isolated right now, but we want everyone to feel included in what we're doing. Our goal was to be a force for good with these songs. We wanted to remind people not to let the world steal their joy, to remind them that even during a global pandemic, it's our responsibility to protect our spirits and find ways to keep on dancing, keep on singing, keep on teaching, keep on loving." The album features guitarist Rocco DeLuca, organist Johnny Shepherd and bassist Jim Wilson.

=== Singles ===
"Under the Heavy Sun" was the first single to be released by Lanois on October 29, 2020.

The second single "Power" was released on January 15, 2021. Lanois said of the single: "I didn't think there was much to say about a song with such a simple message. But just yesterday I got a message from Brian Eno asking me to sign a petition about injustices in Uganda. Apparently, a dictatorship operating under the guise of democracy. The clouds broke and the gods of reason spoke, 'No Time To Rest,' by Uganda or otherwise." Jazz musician Brian Blade and bassist Chris Thomas feature on the single.

== Critical reception ==
Professional ratings
Review scores
Source	Rating
Exclaim!	7/10
Mojo	4/5 stars

Writing for Exclaim!, Kerry Mullin wrote: "Beautiful as these less lo-fi tracks are, they're better suited for a different, effects-driven project. What instead makes Heavy Sun memorable are Lanois' exercises in restraint, like the pretty harmonies with his bandmates and the space ceded to Shepherd's vocal-organ one-two-punch. Regardless, this album reveals that Lanois is as gifted a collaborator and curator of talent as he is a creator of atmospheric productions for megastars." At Mojo, James McNair said: "Heavy Sun is a salve against pandemic blues; a joyous gospel record largely built on the Hammond of Johnny Shepherd, sometime organist at Zion Baptist in Shreveport, Louisiana. Lanois' nuanced production brings gospel to other, sometimes dubbier realms." John Amen, writing for No Depression, wrote: "Heavy Sun is a broad-brush celebration of existence and art; it’s also a testimony to a career spent crafting subtleties, how a project’s details can make all the difference."

== Track listing ==
Heavy Sun track listing
No.	Title	Length
1.	"Dance On"	4:28
2.	"Power"	3:18
3.	"Every Nation"	4:01
4.	"Way Down"	3:45
5.	"Please Don't Try"	4:11
6.	"Tree of Tule"	4:20
7.	"Tumbling Stone"	3:32
8.	"Angels Watching"	4:09
9.	"(Under the) Heavy Sun"	3:27
10.	"Mother's Eyes"	2:55
11.	"Out of Sight"	3:46
