= Light Years from Love =

"Light Years From Love"

Single by Martha Ladly
- A-side: "Light Years from Love"
- B-side: "Dramas of the Human Heart"
- Released: 1983
- Recorded: 1983
- Genre: Synth-pop
- Label: Island
- Songwriter(s): Martha Ladly, Brett Wickens
- Producer(s): Steve Nye

Martha Ladly singles chronology
"Finlandia" (1981)	"Light Years From Love" (1983)

"Light Years from Love" is a solo single by Canadian singer/keyboard player Martha Ladly, released under the name of "Martha" in 1983.

Ladly left Canadian new wave band Martha & the Muffins in December 1980 to form the Scenery Club, this was her second and final solo single. co-written with Brett Wickens, it boasted a string arrangement by Simon Jeffes of The Penguin Cafe Orchestra, and New Order's Peter Hook provided one of his signature bass lines. It was produced by Steve Nye.

The single attracted some attention, but not enough to warrant a full album.
