= This Is the Ice Age =

Studio album by Martha and the Muffins
- Released: 22 October 1981
- Recorded: May–July 1981
- Genre: New wave
- Length: 50:53
- Label: Virgin, EMI
- Producer: Daniel Lanois, Martha and the Muffins

Martha and the Muffins chronology
Trance and Dance (1980)	This Is the Ice Age (1981)	Danseparc (1983)

Singles from This Is the Ice Age
- 1. "Women Around the World at Work" Released: October 1981; 2. "Swimming" Released: December 1981

Professional ratings
Review scores
Source	Rating
AllMusic	4.5/5 stars

This Is the Ice Age is the third album by Martha and the Muffins, released on LP and cassette in 1981. The track "Women Around the World at Work" was released as a single in the UK and Canada (No. 24). "Swimming", featuring a lead vocal by Mark Gane, was also issued as a single in Canada.

The album was a debut for Daniel Lanois as a rock music producer; he would later (often in partnership with Brian Eno) produce for artists as diverse as U2, Bob Dylan, and Dashboard Confessional. Daniel's sister Jocelyne was a member of the band, playing bass and singing backing vocals on this album.

The cover image was taken by Muffins' guitarist Mark Gane from an apartment he was living in on Bloor Street in Toronto. It depicts the Bank of Montreal's headquarters, First Canadian Place over a building in poor repair.

After being unavailable for over 20 years, this much sought-after album was finally re-released on CD in 2005 by EMI Canada and includes two bonus tracks that were not on the original release. The CD was released with copy protection technology, which may make it difficult to play in some players or rip for use on MP3 players.

The working title for this album was The Big Merge.

== Track listing ==
All tracks are written by Mark Gane; except where indicated.

No.	Title	Writer(s)	Length
1.	"Swimming"	Mark Gane, Martha Johnson, Andy Haas, Tim Gane, Jocelyne Lanois, Daniel Lanois	3:52
2.	"Women Around the World at Work"		3:46
3.	"Casualties of Glass"		5:09
4.	"Boy Without Filters"		4:58
5.	"Jets Seem Slower in London Skies"		2:34
6.	"This Is the Ice Age"		7:25
7.	"One Day in Paris"	M. Johnson	4:15
8.	"You Sold the Cottage"		3:55
9.	"Three Hundred Years/Chemistry"	M. Johnson	7:00
10.	"I'm No Good at Conversation" (bonus track)	M. Gane, T. Gane, M. Johnson, A. Haas, J. Lanois	3:43
11.	"Twenty-two in Cincinnati" (bonus track)	M. Gane, T. Gane, M. Johnson, A. Haas, J. Lanois	4:16

- "I'm No Good At Conversation" was the B-side of the "Several Styles of Blonde Girls Dancing" single from Danseparc.
- "Twenty-two in Cincinnati" was the B-side of the "Women Around the World at Work" single.

== Personnel ==
- Martha Johnson – keyboards, vocals
- Mark Gane – guitar, vocals
- Jocelyne Lanois – bass
- Tim Gane – drum kit
- Andy Haas – saxophone

with:

- Daniel Lanois – treatments
- Glenn Schellenberg – piano
- George Axon – percussion
- Alyx Skriabow, Sandy Horne, Corinne Plomish, Gordon Deppe – background vocals
