= Red Earth (Crash Vegas album) =

Studio album by Crash Vegas
- Released: 1989
- Studio: E.S.P., New Orleans, Louisiana; The Lab, Hamilton, Ontario
- Genre: Indie/Folk rock
- Length: 42:29
- Label: Risque Disque
- Producer: Malcolm Burn

Crash Vegas chronology
Red Earth (1989)	Stone (1993)

Professional ratings
Review scores
Source	Rating
AllMusic	4.5/5 stars

Red Earth is the debut album by Canadian indie band Crash Vegas. It was released by Risque Disque, a label formed by Blue Rodeo. Greg Keelor, one of Blue Rodeo's musicians, collaborated with Michelle McAdorey and co-wrote some of the music for the album, and also provided guitar performances for the recorded version of the songs "Red Earth" and "The One That Keeps Me Running". The band toured in support of the album in 1990, and again from late 1991 to mid-1992. The second tour included opening act Junkhouse, which became increasingly popular as a result of this exposure.

The album is typically described as melancholic and brooding folk rock, with a style reminiscent of Cowboy Junkies or 10,000 Maniacs. It was primarily recorded at The Lab, a studio in Hamilton operated by the band's then-bassist Jocelyne Lanois, formerly of Martha & The Muffins, and her partner Malcolm Burn.

Songs that received notable airplay on Canadian radio included "Sky", "Smoke" and "Inside Out", which became a Top 20 hit in Canada. It also includes a cover of "Down to the Wire" from the unreleased album Stampede by Buffalo Springfield, which first appeared on the album Decade by Neil Young.

Performers for the recorded album, in addition to the band members and Keelor, include Malcolm Burn, who played piano, keyboard, percussion and provided backing vocals; Sammy Vegas, lead guitar on "Down to the Wire", and Anne Bourne on keyboards for "Red Earth".

== Track listing ==
1. "Red Earth" (Greg Keelor, Michelle McAdorey) – 4:06
2. "Down to the Wire" (Neil Young) – 2:59
3. "Sky" (Colin Cripps, Michelle McAdorey) – 3:39
4. "Smoke" (Greg Keelor, Michelle McAdorey) – 4:20
5. "I Gave You My Heart" (Ambrose Pottie, Greg Keelor, Jocelyne Lanois, Michelle McAdorey)– 3:15
6. "The One That Keeps Me Running" (Colin Cripps) – 4:58
7. "Moving Too Fast" (Greg Keelor, Michelle McAdorey) – 3:31
8. "Inside Out" (Greg Keelor, Michelle McAdorey) – 3:50
9. "Julia Rain" (Colin Cripps, Michelle McAdorey) – 3:17
10. "It's Not Funny Anymore" (Jocelyne Lanois, Malcolm Burn) – 3:45
11. "Bury Her" (Colin Cripps, Michelle McAdorey) – 4:06
