= Crash Vegas =

Canadian folk rock band

- Michelle McAdorey (centre) and Colin Cripps (right)

Background information
- Origin: Toronto, Ontario, Canada
- Genres: Folk rock
- Years active: 1988–1997
- Labels: Risque Disque, Polygram, Sony
- Past members: Michelle McAdorey; Greg Keelor; Colin Cripps; Jocelyne Lanois; Ambrose Pottie; Darren Watson

Crash Vegas was a Canadian folk rock band which formed in 1988, and achieved moderate success in the early 1990s.

== Biography ==
The band was formed by Michelle McAdorey and Greg Keelor of Blue Rodeo in 1988, who were also in a romantic relationship. They had met in the late 1970s, and McAdorey had later appeared in the music video for Blue Rodeo's song "Try". The two could not agree on a name for the band, originally selecting Giant Tambourine. McAdorey stated that they eventually settled on Crash Vegas by "bouncing words around", a name she liked for its "abrasive vividness". Jocelyne Lanois joined the band as bassist, and shortly after Ambrose Pottie joined as drummer. It was one of the early acts to emerge from the vibrant Queen Street West music scene that developed in downtown Toronto beginning in the mid-1980s.

The group's first performance was at The Cameron House in Toronto, and it played many opening shows for Blue Rodeo over the course of the following year, including at the Horseshoe Tavern and The Rivoli, and entered an extensive writing and rehearsal period. Jocelyne introduced the band to Hamilton guitarist Colin Cripps, whose influence on the band increased as he created "acoustic and ambient guitar sounds that perfectly complemented McAdorey's yearning vocals". According to Cripps, the band's desire for greater autonomy eventually led to firing Keelor, who was supportive of the band's decision as his commitment to Blue Rodeo took precedence. Keelor recommended that Crash Vegas sign with Risque Disque, an imprint of Warner Music Canada, and the band recorded its first album, which was produced by Malcolm Burn in the "Kingsway" studio of Daniel Lanois (brother of Jocelyne) in Hamilton and New Orleans.

=== Red Earth ===
In July 1990, the band released its debut album Red Earth. Music critic Michael Fischer stated that the band was similar to the Cowboy Junkies "without the allusive angst", and a Knight-Ridder review stated Crash Vegas to be "an awake version" of Cowboy Junkies. The latter also described the band's sound as a combination of country music, pop music, and British folk rock.

The band went on extensive tours of Canada and the United States, which included opening several shows for Daniel Lanois and Blues Traveler. The band performed at Edgefest on Canada Day in 1990. It also performed at A Gathering of the Tribes in October 1990, a California music festival organized by Ian Astbury, and were described by a Los Angeles Times music critic as the festival's "least-known performers" that merited "fuller hearings in more intimate surroundings". It had several notable hits on Canadian radio ("Inside Out", "Sky" and "Smoke"), and seemed poised for success.

Lanois, who wanted more of her own original material added to the band's repertoire, left Crash Vegas on acrimonious terms later that year. Around the same time, Risque Disque went bankrupt, leaving the band in limbo. The band recorded a radio session for CBC's Brave New Waves program as a trio in December 1990.

=== Stone ===
Crash Vegas signed a new deal with London/Polygram in 1992. Darren Watson replaced Lanois for the band's second album, Stone, which also included contributions from John Porter and Butch Vig. Recorded in Los Angeles, the album was more energetic than Red Earth, though it also had a "bleakness" resulting from the dissolution of McAdorey's romantic relationship with Keelor.

The song "September Morning" was a tribute to Gram Parsons, a country rock pioneer who died in September 1973 as a result of complications from recreational drug use. A review by Brooks and Wilson in The Spokesman-Review stated that album owed "little to fad or fashion", with compelling lyrics. A review in the Toledo Blade again compared Crash Vegas to Cowboy Junkies, in which reviewer Doug Iverson stated the band to be "juiced up Cowboy Junkies" as it would "languish in quiet, elegant tunes".

Crash Vegas had a troubled relationship with Polygram, and the band subsequently moved to Sony Music Canada after contributing a cover of "Pocahontas" to the 1994 album Borrowed Tunes, the label's tribute album to Neil Young. Crash Vegas was one of the bands signed to rejuvenate that label with "cutting-edge, more street-oriented" performers, which also included Junkhouse, Our Lady Peace, The Philosopher Kings, and Melanie Doane.

The band performed at Edgefest on Canada Day in 1993. It also participated in the Another Roadside Attraction tour organized by The Tragically Hip, which also included Midnight Oil and Hothouse Flowers as performers.

=== Aurora ===
In 1995, Watson and Pottie exited the band partway through the recording of their third album, Aurora. The band, now down to Cripps and McAdorey, completed the album with session musicians John Borra and Mike Sloski as their rhythm section. Gavin Brown and Eric Chenaux took over the bass and drum slots on the subsequent tour.

The compact disc release sold "tens of thousands" of copies in Canada, but was not released in other countries. In her book Misceallenous Female, Damhnait Doyle recounts that when she moved to Toronto from Newfoundland in the mid-1990s, she would play the song "On and On (Lodestar)" repeatedly with her friends, and eventually would play a cover of the song in her band Shaye. The single "On and On (Lodestar)" garnered significant radio airplay in Canada, becoming the second highest-charting single of the band's career, and the music video had been added to the MuchMusic continuous play rotation by April 1995.

In 1997, the band broke up. McAdorey pursued a solo career, and Cripps went on to join Junkhouse and was later a backing musician for Kathleen Edwards and Jim Cuddy.

== Discography ==
=== Studio albums ===
Release date	Title	Chart positions
Release date	Title	Canada RPM Album charts
February 1990	Red Earth	#51
March 1993	Stone	#50
May 1995	Aurora	#31

=== Singles ===
Chart peak date	Title	Chart positions	
Chart peak date	Title	Canada RPM TOP 100	Album
March 1990	"Inside Out"	#18	Red Earth
June 1990	"Sky"	#69	Red Earth
September 1990	"Smoke"	#82	Red Earth
May 1993	"You and Me"	#67	Stone
September 1993	"Keep It to Myself"	—	Stone
August 1994	"Pocahontas"	#62	Aurora
June 1995	"On and On (Lodestar)"	#24	Aurora

=== Music videos ===
Year	Video	Director	Producer
1989	"Inside Out"		
1990	"Sky"	Marsha Herle	
1993	"You and Me"	Bruce McDonald	
1993	"Keep It to Myself"	Norry Niven	Stone Core Films
1994	"Pocahontas"		
1995	"On and On (Lodestar)"	Jeth Weinrich	
