= Michelle McAdorey =

Canadian singer-songwriter

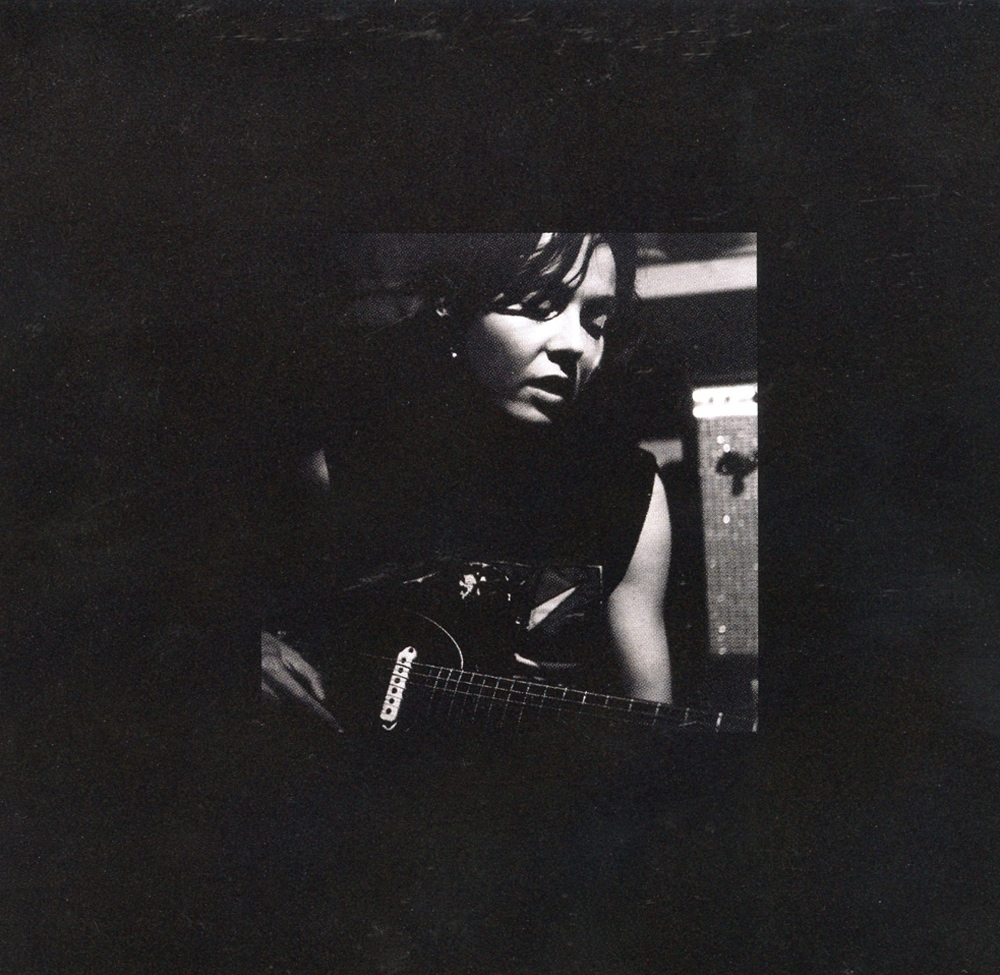

Background information
- Born: Toronto, Ontario, Canada
- Genres: Pop; rock
- Occupation: Singer-songwriter
- Website: www.michellemcadorey.com

Michelle McAdorey is a Canadian singer-songwriter based in Toronto, Ontario. She was a member of the 1990s band Crash Vegas, and now performs and records as a solo artist.

== Early life ==
McAdorey was born in Toronto. She is the niece of Canadian television personality Bob McAdorey.

== Career ==
In the early 1980s, McAdorey lived in the United Kingdom, where she was briefly a backup singer for Kirsty MacColl, singing on MacColl's 1981 record Desperate Character, where she was credited as Blanche McAdorey. While there, she joined a new wave band called Cold Fish. CBS Canada released the record and changed the name of the band to Corect Spelling [sic] without the band's consent. Although the band received widespread exposure for their debut single, "Love Me Today", produced by Midge Ure, the band broke up after receiving poor support from their label.

McAdorey eventually moved back to Toronto, where she wrote songs with Blue Rodeo's Greg Keelor, and appeared in the video for Blue Rodeo's hit single "Try".

McAdorey and Keelor later formed the band Crash Vegas; they recruited Jocelyne Lanois and drummer Ambrose Pottie to complete the group. Some of the songs she had written with Keelor were included in that band's 1990 debut album, Red Earth. McAdorey was awarded the 1990 Socan Songwriter of the year award for the song "Inside Out" off of the album Red Earth. Crash Vegas was also nominated for a Juno in the same year. Crash Vegas went on to release two more albums, Stone in 1993, for which McAdorey was the main songwriter, and Aurora in 1995.

Crash Vegas disbanded in 1996. In 2000, McAdorey released her solo debut, Whirl. The same year, she appeared on King Cobb Steelie's fourth album, Mayday, co-writing and lending her vocals to the title track. In 2003, McAdorey released Love Don't Change with Eric Chenaux. The two had played together for years and this recording was a document of their live playing to date. In 2013, McAdorey released a single on Peterborough label Seventh Fire as part of a limited edition 7" vinyl club.

Her latest solo album, Into Her Future, was released on 30 October 2015 via DWR, and was longlisted for the 2016 Polaris Music Prize. The album appeared on the !earshot National Top 50 Chart in December that year. McAdorey's album Into Her Future was included in many critics' Top 10 Year End Lists.

== Discography ==
- Whirl (2003)
- Love Don't Change (with Eric Chenaux) (2005)
- Into Her Future (2015)
