= Black Stations/White Stations =

1984 single by Martha and the Muffins

Single by M+M

from the album Mystery Walk
- Released: 1984
- Recorded: 1984
- Genre: Synth-pop, new wave, disco
- Length: 5:06 (Album)
- Label: Current/RCA Victor
- Songwriters: Mark Gane; Martha Johnson
- Producers: Daniel Lanois; Mark Gane; Martha Johnson

M+M singles chronology
"Danseparc" (1983)	"Black Stations/White Stations" (1984)	"Cooling The Medium" (1984)

"Black Stations/White Stations" commonly known as "The 1984 Song" is a song recorded by the Canadian group Martha and the Muffins in 1984 from the album Mystery Walk under the shortened name M+M. The track was the first single to be released after the act became a duo consisting of lead singer Martha Johnson and group founder Mark Gane (hence the shortened name, with the first letter of their first names). The single is a departure from the new wave genre, with emphasis this time around on a dance/funk direction, which featured brothers Randy & Michael Brecker and Wayne Mills on horns.

The song's music video was directed by Robert Fresco.

== Background ==
The song's title deals with the subject of racism in the radio industry, at a time when more cutting-edged songs and the radio stations in general were starting to open up to newer formats like rhythmic contemporary, which genre this song predates. It also took on how station policies dictate what can or can not be played on air. This was evidenced by Johnson, who recalled how a song's name was changed, because it was about an interracial relationship. That experience prompted Johnson and Gane to write about their feelings over this practice by recalling the events, in which they use lyrics like "I dream in Black and White" and call for stations in general to "Stand Up and Face the Music/This Is 1984!"

The single was also controversial in its own right, as radio stations avoided playing the single because of the song's title and lyrics despite being a modest hit in Canada, where it reached No. 26. In the United States, the single peaked at No. 63 on the Billboard Hot 100 chart and No. 2 on the Dance/Disco chart, where it reached number 2 in 1984.

== Charts ==
Chart (1984)	Peak position
Canadian RPM Top 100	26
Canadian CHUM Chart	11
UK Singles Chart	46
US Billboard Hot 100	63
US Dance/Disco Top 80 (Billboard)	2
