= Mercy (Rocco DeLuca and the Burden album) =

Studio album by Rocco DeLuca and the Burden
- Released: March 10, 2009
- Recorded: California
- Genres: Alternative rock, blues rock
- Label: Ironworks
- Producer: Daniel Lanois

Rocco DeLuca and the Burden chronology
I Trust You to Kill Me (2006)	Mercy (2009)

Mercy is the second full-length album by American rock band Rocco DeLuca and the Burden, released on March 10, 2009. The band worked with famed U2 producer Daniel Lanois on this album and although he originally was slated for only a small selection of songs, the band later decided to enlist his talents for the entire album. Some descriptive highlights on Mercy include the title track, a slow burning ballad that highlights DeLuca's falsetto and is backed by UK-based band Keane, "I Trust You to Kill Me"—a driving dobro and piano centered plea, and the hard rock "Save Yourself", which was used for the promo of the television movie 24: Redemption.

DeLuca started his North America tour promoting this album upon its release on March 10.

== Track listing ==
No.	Title	Length
1.	"Mercy" (featuring Tom Chaplin)	4:22
2.	"I Trust You to Kill Me"	4:08
3.	"The Painting"	4:46
4.	"Open Pages"	4:00
5.	"Nightingale"	3:38
6.	"Save Yourself"	3:03
7.	"Any Man"	3:09
8.	"Lilja"	5:10
9.	"Bright Lights (Losing Control)"	5:39
10.	"Junky Valentine"	5:34
11.	"When You Learn to Sing"	4:41
12.	"Point of View" (iTunes bonus track)	3:48

== Chart information ==
Year	Album/single	Peak chart position			
Year	Album/single	Billboard 200	Top Heatseekers	US Mainstream Rock	US Modern Rock
2009	Mercy	123	2	-	-
2009	"Save Yourself"	-	-	-	-
