= I Trust You to Kill Me (album) =

Studio album by Rocco DeLuca and the Burden
- Released: March 21, 2006
- Genres: Rock, blues, new wave
- Label: Ironworks
- Producer: Jude Cole

Rocco DeLuca and the Burden chronology
I Trust You to Kill Me (2006)	Mercy (2009)

Professional ratings
Review scores
Source	Rating
AllMusic	3.5/5 stars

I Trust You to Kill Me is the debut album by Rocco DeLuca and the Burden. It was released on CD on March 21, 2006 on the Ironworks label. The album was produced by Jude Cole and mixed by Florian Ammon, except for tracks 2, 7 and 10 which were mixed by Dave Reed. The album was engineered by Florian Ammon and Dave Reed.

== Track listing ==
No.	Title	Length
1.	"Gift"	3:52
2.	"Dope"	3:28
3.	"Colorful"	3:05
4.	"Bus Ride"	4:14
5.	"Swing Low"	3:54
6.	"Speak to Me"	2:52
7.	"How Fast"	2:24
8.	"Gravitate"	2:59
9.	"Mystified"	3:52
10.	"Draw"	3:13
11.	"Soul"	4:58
12.	"Favor"	4:52

== Chart information ==
Year	Album/single	Peak chart position		
Year	Album/single	Billboard 200	Top Heatseekers	Top Independent Albums
2006	I Trust You to Kill Me	177	5	12
