= Shine (Daniel Lanois album) =

Studio album by Daniel Lanois
- Released: April 22, 2003
- Genre: Rock
- Length: 46:15
- Label: ANTI-
- Producer: Daniel Lanois

Daniel Lanois chronology
For the Beauty of Wynona (1993)	Shine (2003)	Rockets (2004)

Singles from Shine
- 1. "Falling at Your Feet"

Shine is the third studio album by songwriter and record producer Daniel Lanois. It was released on April 22, 2003, through Anti-. It was his first solo release in ten years.

== Reception ==
Professional ratings
Aggregate scores
Source	Rating
Metacritic	74/100
Review scores
Source	Rating
AllMusic	4.5/5 stars
Alternative Press	3.5/5 stars
Entertainment Weekly	B
The Guardian	4/5 stars
Mojo	3.5/5 stars
Pitchfork	5.6/10
Q	4/5 stars
Rolling Stone	3/5 stars
Uncut	8/10
The Village Voice	C+

== Track listing ==
All tracks written by Daniel Lanois unless otherwise noted.

No.	Title	Writers	Length
1.	"I Love You"		4:31
2.	"Falling at Your Feet"	Bono, Lanois	3:41
3.	"As Tears Roll By"		3:55
4.	"Sometimes"		2:28
5.	"Shine"		3:30
6.	"Transmitter"		3:08
7.	"San Juan"		2:33
8.	"Matador"		5:02
9.	"Space Kay"		2:01
10.	"Slow Giving"		3:52
11.	"Fire"		3:38
12.	"Power of One"		3:43
13.	"JJ Leaves LA"		4:13

Canada bonus track
No.	Title	Length
14.	"Red"	2:53

"Red" was rerecorded for the 2018 video game Red Dead Redemption 2, being used for the first song in the end credits and the seventh song in the game's soundtrack.

== Personnel ==
- Daniel Lanois – guitar, bass, pedal steel guitar, vocals
- Malcolm Burn – guitar, keyboards
- Brian Blade – drums
- Brady Blade Jr. – drums
- Daryl Johnson – bass
- Bono – vocals on "Falling At Your Feet"
- Emmylou Harris – backing vocals on "I Love You"
- Aaron Embry – piano, Hammond B3, melodica

Technical

- Adam Samuels, Jennifer Tipoulow – recording
- Mark Howard, Wayne Lorenz – early recording
- Danny Clinch – front cover photography
