= Martha Ladly =

Canadian musician

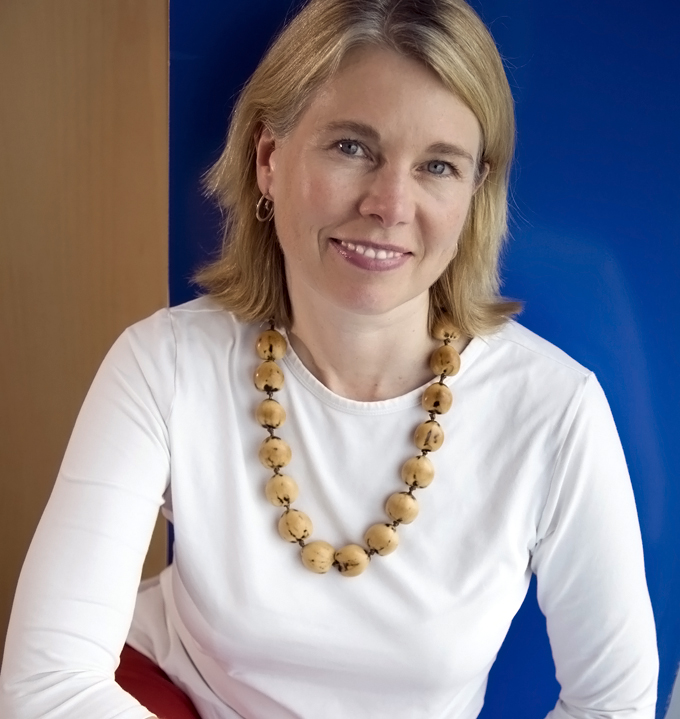
- Ladly in 2011
- Occupations: Academic; designer; musician
- Known for: Associate Professor of Interaction Design

Martha Jane Ladly is a Canadian academic, designer and musician. She is a professor of design at OCAD University. Ladly also has had a long career as a musician and became famous internationally as part of rock band Martha and the Muffins. She had a solo career in the mid-1980s and then worked in design and education.

== Musical career ==
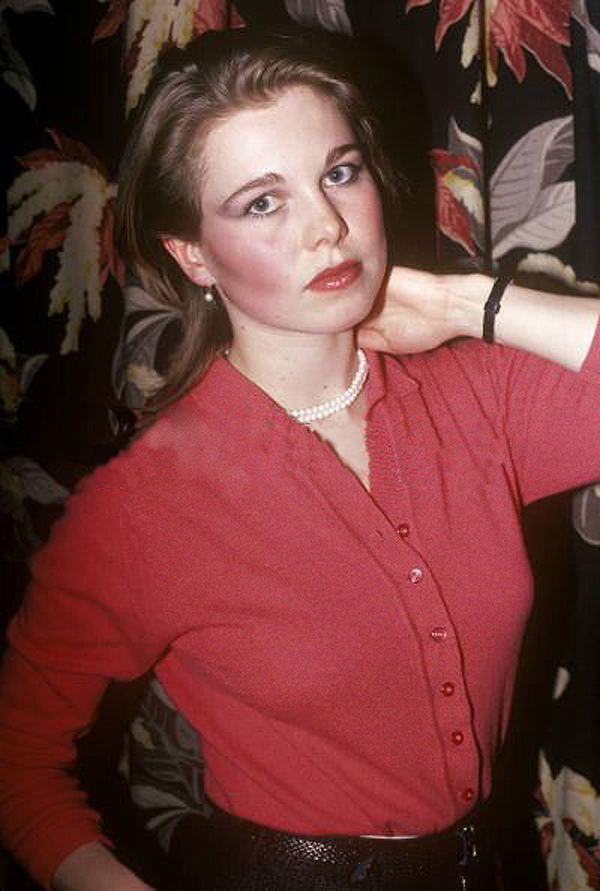
Ladly in 1982 (during her time with the Associates)

A student at the Ontario College of Art in Toronto, Ontario, Ladly was invited to join new wave band Martha and the Muffins in 1978. She became one of two vocalists and keyboardists named Martha in the band. The other Martha was Martha Johnson, who sang lead on the majority of the group's songs, including their biggest hit, 1980's "Echo Beach".

Ladly played with the band from 1978 to 1980 and sang lead vocals on the group's seventh single, her composition "Was Ezo". Ladly left the band in August 1980 having been awarded an art scholarship. She subsequently relocated to the United Kingdom, releasing two solo singles ("Finlandia" and "Light Years from Love") the latter featuring Peter Hook on bass guitar. In addition to music, she worked in visual arts and design with designer Peter Saville. Her painting Factus 8 was used by Saville for the sleeve of New Order's EP 1981–1982 (1982).

During her time in England, while pursuing her twin interests in music and visual art, Ladly became friends with a number of popular British musical acts. Orchestral Manoeuvres in the Dark credits Ladly for suggesting the titles of their 1981 hit album Architecture & Morality and their 1984 hit single "Tesla Girls". In 1982, Ladly provided backing vocals for Roxy Music and joined cult Scottish post-punk act the Associates appearing with them on Top of the Pops. She left the Associates in 1986 and subsequently worked with Robert Palmer's band.

In 1991, during which time she was known as Martha Ladly Hoffnung, she managed Anta's, 'a trend setting design business' in Portland Road, Holland Park, London. Ladly was designer for the company which recoloured "authentic tartan patterns".

From 1992 to 2001, she worked with Peter Gabriel as the manager of Real World Design and editor of Real World Notes.

=== Solo discography ===
- 1981 – "Finlandia"
- 1983 – "Light Years from Love"

== Academic career ==
In 2012, Ladly was appointed as associate dean of graduate studies at the Ontario College of Art and Design. She is an associate professor of design where her specialty is interactive communication. She is a mentor with the Canadian Film Centre's Interactive Project Lab (IPL) and a faculty member with the Habitat Interactive Art and Entertainment Program. Before her appointment at OCAD, she was the creative director of HorizonZero, a bilingual internet publication in collaboration with the Banff New Media Institute and Culture Canada.

== Awards ==
- 2007: SSHRC: Principal Investigator. ITST Mobile Nation Conference Grant
- 2007: Canadian Design Research Network: Co-Principal Investigator. Mobile Nation Publications, Workshops and Dissemination Grant
- 2006: Portage: Co-applicant, Canadian Heritage New Media Research Network
- 2005-06: The Mobile Digital Commons Network 2: Co-applicant, Canadian Heritage New Media Research Network
- 1996, 1982: British Designers and Art Directors Association (D&AD): Silver Citation for Best Multimedia Packaging Design for 'EVE. Silver Citation for Best Record Sleeve Design for New Order single "Everything's Gone Green"
- 1994: American Recording Academy: Grammy Award Nomination for Best Record Sleeve Packaging Design for Peter Gabriel Secret World Live
- 1981: Canadian Juno Award: for Single of the Year with Martha and the Muffins for the single "Echo Beach".
