= Martha and the Muffins =

Canadian rock band

- Also known as: M + M
- Origin: Toronto, Ontario, Canada
- Genres: Post-punk; new wave; art pop; dance-pop
- Years active: 1977–present
- Labels: Dindisc/Virgin, Current/RCA
- Members: Martha Johnson; Mark Gane
- Past members: David Millar; Carl Finkle; Tim Gane; Martha Ladly; Andy Haas; Jocelyne Lanois; Nick Kent
- Website: marthaandthemuffins.com

Martha and the Muffins are a Canadian rock band, active from 1977 to the present. Although they only had one major international hit single "Echo Beach" under their original band name, they had a number of hits in their native Canada, and the core members of the band also charted in Canada and internationally as M + M.

== Career ==
=== Formation and early years (1977–1978) ===
The group's initial line-up came together in Toronto in 1977, when David Millar asked his fellow Ontario College of Art student Mark Gane to help him start a band. Millar recruited Martha Johnson to play keyboards; Johnson brought in a friend from high school, Carl Finkle, to play bass; and Gane's brother Tim signed on as the drummer. With Millar and Mark Gane as guitarists, and Johnson as lead vocalist, this is the line up that debuted at an Ontario College of Art Hallowe'en party in October 1977.

They chose the name "Martha and the Muffins" to distance themselves from the aggressive names adopted by many punk bands of the era. According to Mark Gane: "We decided to use it as a temporary name until we could all agree on something better." The name ended up sticking for the next seven years.

Saxophone player Andy Haas began performing with the band in early 1978 (initially, as a guest artist). Founding-member Millar left the band shortly thereafter, preferring to work as the band's sound engineer for live shows. He was replaced by Martha Ladly, who had attended high school with the Ganes. She became the group's second keyboardist/vocalist named Martha, although Martha Johnson remained the group's primary lead singer.

In 1978, they released their first independent single "Insect Love". This and a demo tape recorded in June 1978 quickly garnered them a recording deal with the Dindisc offshoot of Virgin Records.

=== International success (1979–1982) ===
In 1979, the band travelled to England to record their first album Metro Music, which was released in 1980. The album was produced by Mike Howlett and recorded at The Manor Studios in Oxfordshire.

This album gave Martha and the Muffins a major international hit single with "Echo Beach". Although the album did not spawn any further hits, "Paint by Number Heart" did get some airplay on Canadian radio while "Saigon" and a further single "Suburban Dream" were played on BBC Radio 1. In addition, both songs appeared on the American dance charts.

In October 1980, the band released their second album, Trance and Dance, which was less successful and did not give the band any hit singles. Ladly left the band after the album was recorded (but before it was released) to pursue an art scholarship. Jean Wilson briefly replaced Ladly on tour in the latter part of 1980, but never recorded with the group.

In 1981, bassist Finkle left the band and was replaced by Jocelyne Lanois, the sister of then-unknown record producer Daniel Lanois. After Jocelyne introduced the band to her brother, they figured Daniel was an ideal candidate to produce their next LP. However, in order to utilize his services as a co-producer, the band had to agree to Virgin Records' demand that, if they were going to insist on working with an unknown producer, they would also have to work with a lower recording budget.

Martha and the Muffins' 1981 album This Is the Ice Age, produced by Daniel Lanois and the band, was recorded in Toronto and Hamilton, Ontario. More experimental than previous efforts, it also gained significant Canadian radio airplay from the singles "Women Around the World at Work" (a No. 24 hit in Canada, peaking on November 7 of the same year on the RPM national singles chart) and "Swimming". Shortly after the album's release, Tim Gane decided he did not want to tour, and left the band; he was replaced by new drummer Nick Kent.

Despite critical acclaim, This Is the Ice Age did not spin off any hit singles outside of Canada, and Virgin dropped the band from their roster.

=== The M+M years (1983–1986) ===
After the tour for This Is the Ice Age, Haas left the band over creative differences in a public spat carried out in the "letters to the editor" column of Toronto's NOW. The band, now a quartet (Martha Johnson, Mark Gane, Jocelyne Lanois, and Nick Kent), signed to Canadian indie label Current Records, distributed by RCA.

1983's Danseparc was produced by Daniel Lanois, Gane, and Johnson. Gane, eager to drop the name "Martha and the Muffins", proposed that the group be now called "M + M". In a compromise, both names were used for a time, and the Danseparc album cover had both "M + M" and "Martha and the Muffins" printed on it. Johnson would later explain that the name change just never stuck, because "our legacy was Martha and the Muffins."

The album's title track was another top 40 single in Canada and, for the Danseparc tour, the group was augmented by auxiliary players including guitarist Michael Brook. At the end of the tour, Gane and Johnson (now a couple) announced that, although they wanted to continue as a recording act, they also wanted to branch out in new directions by using new collaborators. In essence, Gane and Johnson decided that "M + M" was now Martha + Mark, along with studio musicians and sidemen.

The duo's 1984 album Mystery Walk was again co-produced by Daniel Lanois with Gane and Johnson, and it featured a large sticker crediting the band as "M + M o/k/a Martha and the Muffins". Guest players included drummer Yogi Horton, bassist Tinker Barfield, and the Brecker Brothers on horns.

Mystery Walk album gave M + M/Martha and the Muffins their biggest hit in years with "Black Stations/White Stations". The song was an anti-racist anthem whose first verse took radio stations to task for refusing to play a song about mixed-race romance, a story that Martha Johnson had heard related on the radio while driving in her car.

"Black Stations/White Stations" was a hit in Canada; in the United States, it reached no. 2 on the dance music charts, but was banned by many radio stations. "Cooling the Medium", the second single, was also a significant hit in Canada.

In 1985, Johnson and Gane started work on their next album in Montreal before heading to Bath, England to work with producer David Lord, resulting in the album The World Is a Ball (1986). Although the lead single, "Song in My Head", garnered them some airplay (and was another top 40 hit in Canada), the album sold poorly. Gane and Johnson spent some time living in England.

=== Martha and the Muffins revived (1987–1992) ===
Johnson and Gane took several years to record a follow-up to The World Is a Ball. Recording started in Bath, where the couple had moved to in 1987, and it continued in Toronto when they moved back to their home city in 1989. In 1992, they released the album Modern Lullaby. For these and all future releases, the duo revived the name "Martha and the Muffins", although the only other original Muffin to participate in the making of this album was Tim Gane (on "additional percussion"). The lead single "Rainbow Sign" made RPM's "CanCon to Watch" chart at no. 4 but did not cross over into the top 100, and the parent album similarly failed to chart. The same year, Martha and the Muffins contributed a cover of Joni Mitchell's "Shades of Scarlett Conquering" for the Mitchell tribute album Back to the Garden.

In 1992, Johnson and Gane's daughter Eve was born. After the disappointing sales of Modern Lullaby, and a new family situation to consider, Johnson and Gane essentially shut down the band and moved to other projects for the next several years.

=== Side projects and reunions (1993–2008) ===
In 1995, Johnson released an album of children's music entitled Songs from the Tree House. Credited simply to "Martha", the album was an M+M/Martha and the Muffins project in all but name, as the record was written, arranged and produced by Gane and Johnson. Songs from the Tree House won a 1996 Juno Award for best children's album.

In 1998, Johnson and Gane recorded a single new bonus track ("Resurrection") for the 1998 Martha and the Muffins/M+M compilation album Then Again: A Retrospective. The following year, another new Martha and the Muffins recording ("Do You Ever Wonder?") appeared on a various-artists compilation called The World According to Popguru.

In May 1999, Martha and the Muffins performed a live version of "Echo Beach" on the show Open Mike with Mike Bullard. In addition to Mark Gane and Martha Johnson, the band included Jocelyne Lanois and another Gane brother, Nick.

In 2003, the Johnson/Gane duo (augmented by session players) performed at the CFNY Reunion as Martha and the Muffins. Then in 2005, they performed a number of reunion shows in Toronto, including a double bill with the also-reunited Parachute Club on 14 May. A later concert that year also included Jocelyne Lanois on guitar. However, no other former Martha and the Muffins members participated in these 2005 'reunion' shows, which were the first full-length Martha and the Muffins concerts since 1987. Around this time, one of their later songs, "Paradise", became popularized when the Canadian TV show Paradise Falls used the song as its closing-credits theme.

In 2007/2008, Martha and the Muffins had both This Is the Ice Age and Danseparc reissued on CD. The latter was billed as Danseparc: 25th Anniversary Edition, and was digitally remastered by Peter J. Moore. Both albums featured bonus tracks.

=== Delicate (2010) ===
In June 2008, Martha and the Muffins began work on a new album, to be called Delicate, in collaboration with producer David Bottrill. In December 2009, the first single from the album Mess was made available on YouTube. The album was released on February 2, 2010, on their own label Muffin Music. It was Martha and the Muffins' first album of new material in 18 years.

Two additional non-album singles were also released in 2010. The first was a new acoustic studio version of "Echo Beach", dubbed the "30th Anniversary Edition". It was released digitally as well as on a physical CD, in both cases with the additional bonus track "Big Day".

Towards the end of 2010, the band issued the digital-only holiday single "Santa's Gift of Love".

=== Martha Johnson: Solo One (2013) ===
In early 2013, Martha Johnson announced she would be recording a solo album, and raised money for the recording using Kickstarter. The album Solo One was billed as her solo debut, even though she previously had released a solo kids album. Johnson's M+M/Muffins partner Mark Gane was involved in every stage of the album, co-producing all 11 tracks, playing on nine, and co-writing seven. Other contributors to the album, which was released in the autumn of 2013, included Ron Sexsmith and Ray Dillard.

=== Recent activity (2020) ===
After another long layoff from being an active performing entity, Martha and the Muffins released a video and downloadable song in May 2020 called "Stay Home and Dance". A reworking of the 1984 M+M track "Come Out and Dance", the new song and video was released in response to the stay-at-home orders surrounding the COVID-19 pandemic.

In 2021, they released the compilation Marthology: In and Outtakes, collecting rarities and demo versions of past songs. At the same time they indicated that they were working on a new album, tentatively slated for release in 2022.

== Careers outside Martha and the Muffins ==
- Martha Ladly moved to the United Kingdom where she sang backing vocals and played keyboards for the Associates 1982 album Sulk and supporting tour. She also recorded two solo singles ("Finlandia," and "Light Years from Love") and went on to join Robert Palmer's band. She also continued her work in visual arts, including a stint at Peter Saville Associates, and suggested the album title "Architecture & Morality" to the band Orchestral Manoeuvres in the Dark. She later joined Peter Gabriel's Real World multimedia production team. She is now a professor of design at the Ontario College of Art & Design.
- Martha Johnson recorded a children's album in 1995, which won a Juno Award for Best Children's Album. The album (credited simply to "Martha") was produced by Mark Gane and Martha Johnson. She most recently issued her album Solo One in 2013.
- Johnson and her partner Mark Gane also have scored several Canadian films and TV series.
- Jocelyne Lanois returned to the Canadian pop charts in 1989 as a member of Crash Vegas.
- Carl Finkle briefly managed early 1980s Canadian new wave band Spoons at the time of their first hit single "Nova Heart". He later became an architect and swimming pool designer. Finkle later played the glockenspiel with Argonotes, the Toronto Argonauts Band.
- Andy Haas became a security guard in an art museum, and after a long layoff from recording, began issuing CDs of instrumental material beginning in 1997. Haas has released two instrumental solo CDs, and two collaborative CDs with other instrumentalists.

== Discography ==
Martha and the Muffins discography
- Studio albums: 8
- Compilation albums: 2
- Singles: 18

=== Studio albums ===
Year	Album details	Chart peak positions			
Year	Album details	CA	AUS	UK	US
1980	Metro Music: Label: Dindisc	16	46	34	187
1980	Trance and Dance: Labels: Dindisc, Virgin Records	93	–	–	–
1981	This Is the Ice Age: Labels: Virgin, EMI	36	–	–	–
1983	Danseparc: Labels: Current/RCA Records (credited to Martha and the Muffins/M + M)	36	–	–	184
1984	Mystery Walk: Labels: Current/RCA (credited to M + M)	56	–	–	163
1986	The World Is a Ball: Labels: Current/RCA (credited to M + M)	47	–	–	–
1992	Modern Lullaby: Label: Intrepid Records	–	–	–	–
2010	Delicate: Label: Muffin Music	–	–	–	–
"–" denotes releases that did not chart or were not released in that territory.

=== Compilation albums ===
Year	Album details
1987	Far Away in Time: Label: Virgin
1998	Then Again: A Retrospective: Label: EMI Music (Canada)
2021	Marthology: In and Outtakes: Label: Popguru

=== Singles ===
Year	Single	Chart peak positions							Certifications	Album
Year	Single	CAN	CAN CHUM	AUS	NZ	UK	US	US Dance	Certifications	Album
1978	"Insect Love"	–	–	–	–	–	–	–		Single only
1979	"Insect Love" (re-recorded version)	–	–	–	–	–	–	–		Single only
1980	"Echo Beach"	5	5	6	–	10	–	37	BPI: Gold	Metro Music
1980	"Saigon"	–	–	–	–	–	–	–		Metro Music
1980	"Paint by Number Heart"	69	20	–	–	–	–	37		Metro Music
1980	"About Insomnia"	–	–	–	–	–	–	–		Trance and Dance
1980	"Suburban Dream"	–	–	–	–	–	–	–		Trance and Dance
1981	"Was Ezo"	–	–	–	–	–	–	–		Trance and Dance
1981	"Women Around the World at Work"	24	10	–	–	–	–	–		This Is the Ice Age
1981	"Swimming"	–	16	–	–	–	–	–		This Is the Ice Age
1983	"Danseparc (Every Day It's Tomorrow)"	31	–	–	–	–	–	–		Danseparc
1984	"Black Stations/White Stations"	26	11	–	49	46	63	2		Mystery Walk
1984	"Cooling the Medium"	72	–	–	–	–	–	34		Mystery Walk
1986	"Song in My Head"	30	25	–	–	–	–	–		The World Is a Ball
1986	"Someone Else's Shoes"	–	–	–	–	–	–	–		The World Is a Ball
1986	"Only You"	–	–	–	–	–	–	–		The World Is a Ball
1992	"Rainbow Sign"	–	–	–	–	–	–	–		Modern Lullaby
2010	"Mess"	–	–	–	–	–	–	–		Delicate
"–" denotes releases that did not chart or were not released in that territory.
