= Echo Beach =

1980 single by Martha and the Muffins

Single by Martha and the Muffins

from the album Metro Music
- B-side: "Teddy the Dink"
- Released: February 1980
- Recorded: August 1979
- Genre: New wave
- Length: 3:38
- Label: Dindisc
- Songwriter: Mark Gane
- Producer: Mike Howlett

Martha and the Muffins singles chronology
"Insect Love" (1979)	"Echo Beach" (1980)	"Saigon" (1980)

Music video
- "Echo Beach" on YouTube

"Echo Beach" is a song by Canadian musical group Martha and the Muffins. Written by band member Mark Gane, it was released as a single from their album Metro Music in 1980 and went on to reach number five in Canada, number six in Australia, and number 10 in the UK. It was certified gold in Canada on October 1, 1980, a month after Metro Music achieved gold status; the song also won the Juno Award for Single of the Year. "Echo Beach" was the band's only significant international hit, although they had other popular singles in Canada.

== Background ==
Echo Beach in the song is not a real place. It is a metaphor for a pleasant location that someone thinks of when they have an unsatisfactory job. There is now an Echo Beach in Toronto, but it was named after the song. The song was created while Gane was working checking wallpaper for printing faults. He found the work rather dull and his mind drifted to times he would like to live over again. One such time was an evening spent at Sunnyside Beach on the shoreline of Lake Ontario in Toronto in summer.

The B-side, 'Teddy The Dink', is featured on the band's second album Trance and Dance.

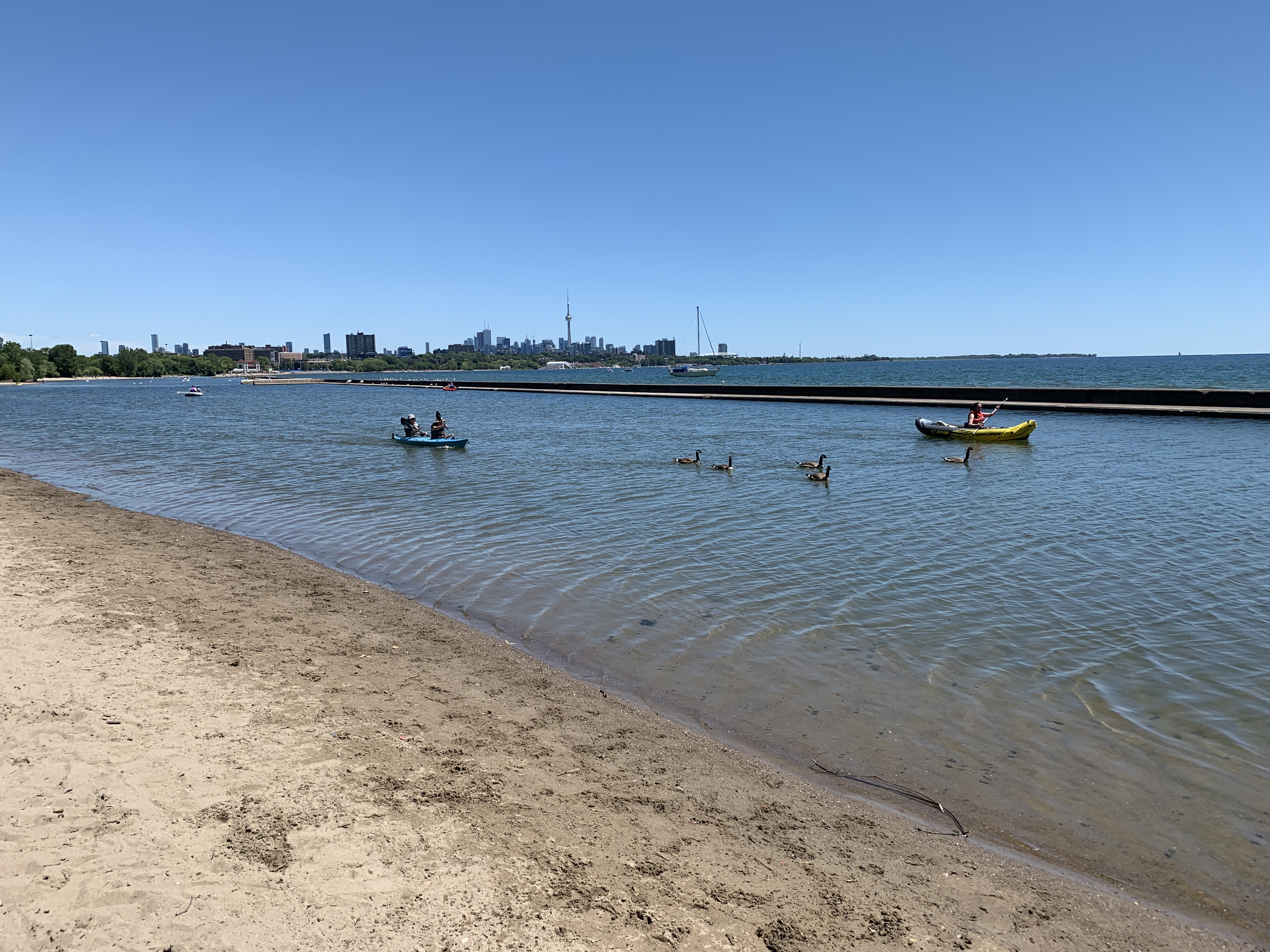
Sunnyside Beach in Toronto, Canada

The map shown on the cover of the Canadian and US version of the single is of the eastern part of Toronto, including the Beaches neighbourhood, the Leslie Street Spit, and a portion of the Toronto Islands. The UK version of the single shows the north-western end of the Fleet Lagoon and the bar of Chesil Beach, the location of Abbotsbury Swannery in Dorset. It has been modified to show Chesil Beach being named as Echo Beach.

== Reception ==
In 2003, Q magazine listed "Echo Beach" among the 1001 best songs ever.

In 2005, it was named the 35th greatest Canadian song of all time on the CBC Radio One series 50 Tracks.

== Releases ==
In 2010, the band released a 30th anniversary version of "Echo Beach". A commentator described the new version as "definitely a different song compared to the previous version; it's slower and the famous guitar riff that introduces the song is acoustic. [The original] was also good to be danced to, whereas the new one is darker and languid." Mark Gane explained, "We wanted to commemorate the 30th anniversary of the song, by not trying to replicate the version that we originally recorded, but as musicians who've experienced three decades of living. We'd like to refer to the new recording of 'Echo Beach' as our 'grown-up' version."

== In popular culture ==
The 2009 song "Box 'n' Locks" by British singer MPHO uses the melody from Echo Beach.

In June 2011, concert promoter Live Nation opened a 4,000-person outdoor concert facility in Toronto and named it after the song.

== Track listing ==
- 7-inch single

A. "Echo Beach" – 3:38
B. "Teddy the Dink" – 3:32

== Charts ==
=== Weekly charts ===
Chart (1980)	Peak position
Australia (Kent Music Report)	6
Canadian Singles (RPM)	5
Irish Singles (IRMA)	11
UK Singles (OCC)	10
US Hot Disco Singles (Billboard)	37

=== Year-end charts ===
Chart (1980)	Position
Australia (Kent Music Report)	59
Canada (RPM Magazine)	16

== Certifications ==
Region	Certification	Certified units/sales
Canada (Music Canada)	Gold	75,000^{^}
United Kingdom (BPI)	Gold	400,000^{‡}
^{^} Shipments figures based on certification alone.^{‡} Sales+streaming figures based on certification alone.

== Toyah version ==
"Echo Beach"

Single by Toyah

from the album Desire
- B-side: "Plenty"
- Released: April 6, 1987
- Length: 3:20
- Label: E.G.
- Songwriter: Mark Gane
- Producer: Mike Hedges

Toyah singles chronology
"World in Action" (1985)	"Echo Beach" (1987)	"Moonlight Dancing" (1987)

Music video
- "Echo Beach" on YouTube

British singer Toyah covered "Echo Beach" on her 1987 album Desire. The song was released as the lead single from the album and reached number 54 in the UK Singles Chart. It is Toyah's last charting single in the UK to date.

=== Track listings ===
- 7-inch single

A. "Echo Beach" – 3:20
B. "Plenty" – 3:40

- 12-inch single

A. "Echo Beach" (Surf mix) – 5:36
B1. "Echo Beach" (7-inch mix) – 3:20
B2. "Plenty" – 3:40

=== Charts ===
Chart (1987)	Peak position
UK Singles (OCC)	54
