= Jocelyne Lanois =

Canadian musician

- Origin: Hull, Quebec, Canada
- Occupations: Musician, songwriter
- Instrument: Bass guitar
- Years active: 1981–present
- Formerly of: Martha and the Muffins; Crash Vegas

Jocelyne Chantal Lanois is a Canadian musician, bass player and songwriter from Hull, Quebec, who has been a member of the bands Martha and the Muffins and Crash Vegas. She is the sister of record producer Daniel Lanois, and was partner at his experimental Lab Studio with producer/musician Malcolm Burn.

== Career ==
Lanois' first notable gig was her 1981-1983 stint as the bassist with Martha and the Muffins, traversing their third and fourth albums This Is the Ice Age and Danseparc. She played bass on their Canadian top 40 hits "Women Around The World At Work" (1981) and "Danseparc (Every Day It's Tomorrow)" (1983). Both albums (and their attendant singles) were produced by her brother Daniel, who was introduced to the group via Jocelyne. Though Daniel had recorded and produced music prior to working with Martha and the Muffins, This Is the Ice Age was the first rock music production credit of his career.

After leaving Martha and the Muffins, Jocelyn Lanois partnered with Malcolm Burn to open The Lab studios in Hamilton, Ontario. The studio recorded several artists, including Teenage Head, during its years in operation in the late 1980s and early 1990s. Lanois herself worked both on the administrative and the creative sides. On the creative front, she played bongos on one track, and sang backing vocals on two others on Burn's only solo release Redemption (1988), which was recorded at the Lab.

Lanois was later with Crash Vegas for their first album Red Earth (produced by Burn, at The Lab), playing bass on their Canadian top 40 hit "Inside Out" (1990). Lanois left the group on acrimonious terms in late 1990, as she wanted more of her songwriting to be featured.

Lanois went on to touring stints as bass player with Ani DiFranco and Chris Whitley, and she played bass on the track "Shelter" from Sarah McLachlan's album Solace (1991).

In 2000, Lanois scored the short film Passengers. Between 2005 and 2008 she rejoined a revived Martha and the Muffins as bassist and backing vocalist for live dates, but left the group before they began recording their 2010 album Delicate.
