= Daniel Lanois =

Canadian record producer and musician (born 1951)

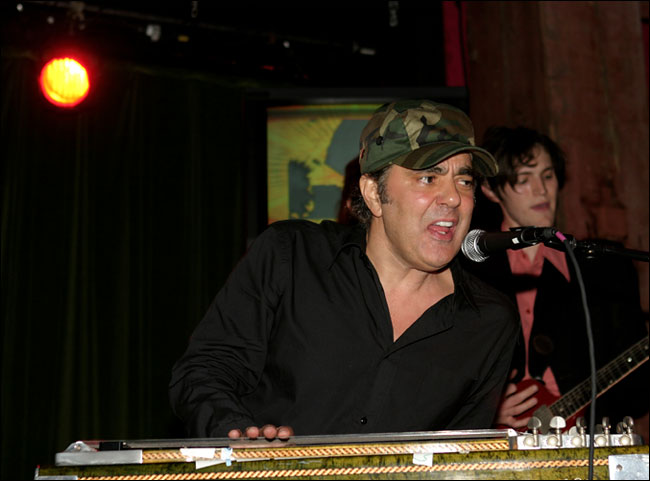
- Lanois on pedal steel guitar

Background information
- Born: Daniel Roland Lanois; September 19, 1951 (age 75); Hull, Quebec, Canada
- Origin: Hamilton, Ontario, Canada
- Genres: Rock; alternative rock; ambient
- Occupations: Record producer; musician; songwriter
- Instruments: Vocals; guitar; bass; pedal steel; omnichord; keyboards
- Years active: 1968–present
- Labels: Opal; Warner Bros.; ANTI-; Red Floor; MapleMusic (Canada)
- Website: daniellanois.com

Daniel Roland Lanois CM (/lænˈwɑː/ lan-WAH, French: [lanwa]; born September 19, 1951) is a Canadian record producer and musician.

He has produced albums by artists including Bob Dylan, Neil Young, Peter Gabriel, Robbie Robertson, Emmylou Harris, Willie Nelson, and Harold Budd. He collaborated with Brian Eno to create the ambient genre and produce several albums for U2, including The Joshua Tree (1987) and Achtung Baby (1991). Three albums produced or co-produced by Lanois have won the Grammy Award for Album of the Year. Four other albums received Grammy nominations.

Lanois has released several solo albums. He wrote and performed the music for the 1996 film Sling Blade, and provided several vocal tracks for Red Dead Redemption 2.

== Biography ==
=== Early life and career ===
Lanois was born in 1951 in Hull, Quebec, to Guy and Jill Lanois. He began playing music at age nine with the penny whistle, and soon transitioned to pedal steel guitar. Lanois started his production career when he was 17, recording local artists including Simply Saucer with his brother Bob Lanois in a studio in the basement of their mother's home in Ancaster, Ontario. Later, Lanois started Grant Avenue Studio in an old house which he purchased in Hamilton, Ontario. He worked with a number of local bands, including Martha and the Muffins (for which his sister Jocelyne played bass), Ray Materick, Spoons, and the Canadian children's singer Raffi.

=== Producer ===
In 1981, Lanois played on and produced the album This Is the Ice Age by Martha and the Muffins. In 1985, he and two members of the band earned a CASBY award for their work on the band's (by then going by "M + M") 1984 album Mystery Walk.

Lanois worked collaboratively with Brian Eno on some of Eno's own projects, one of which was the "Prophecy Theme" for David Lynch's film adaptation of Frank Herbert's Dune. Eno invited him to co-produce U2's album The Unforgettable Fire. Along with Eno, he went on to produce U2's The Joshua Tree, the 1987 Grammy Award for Album of the Year winner, and some of the band's other works including Achtung Baby and All That You Can't Leave Behind, both of which were nominated for the same award but did not win. Lanois once again collaborated with U2 and Brian Eno on the band's 2009 album, No Line on the Horizon. He was involved in the songwriting process as well as mixing and production.

Lanois' early work with U2 led to him being hired to produce albums for other top-selling artists. He collaborated with Peter Gabriel on his album Birdy (1985), the soundtrack to Alan Parker's film of the same name, and then spent most of 1985 co-producing Gabriel's album So. The album was released in 1986 and became his best-selling release, earning multi-platinum sales and a Grammy nomination for Album of the Year. Lanois later co-produced Gabriel's follow-up, Us which was released in 1992 and also went platinum.

Bono recommended Lanois to Bob Dylan in the late 1980s; in 1989, Lanois produced Dylan's Oh Mercy. Eight years later, Dylan and Lanois worked together on Time Out of Mind, which won another Grammy Award for Album of the Year in 1997. The Neve 8068 featured on the cover of Time Out of Mind has a home at the historic The Church Studio in Tulsa, Oklahoma. Purchased by Teresa Knox, it was carefully restored to factory settings. In his autobiographical Chronicles, Vol. 1, Dylan describes in depth the contentious but rewarding working relationship he developed with Lanois.

Wrecking Ball, his 1995 collaboration with Emmylou Harris, won a 1996 Grammy Award for Best Contemporary Folk Album. In 1998, he produced and appeared on Willie Nelson's album Teatro.

Lanois was working on Neil Young's record Le Noise in June 2010 when he was hospitalized after suffering multiple injuries in a motorcycle crash in the Silver Lake area of Los Angeles. He has since recovered.

Lanois' production is recognizable and notable for its 'big' and 'live' drum sound, atmospheric guitars and ambient reverb. Rolling Stone called Lanois the "most important record producer to emerge in the Eighties."

=== Recording artist ===
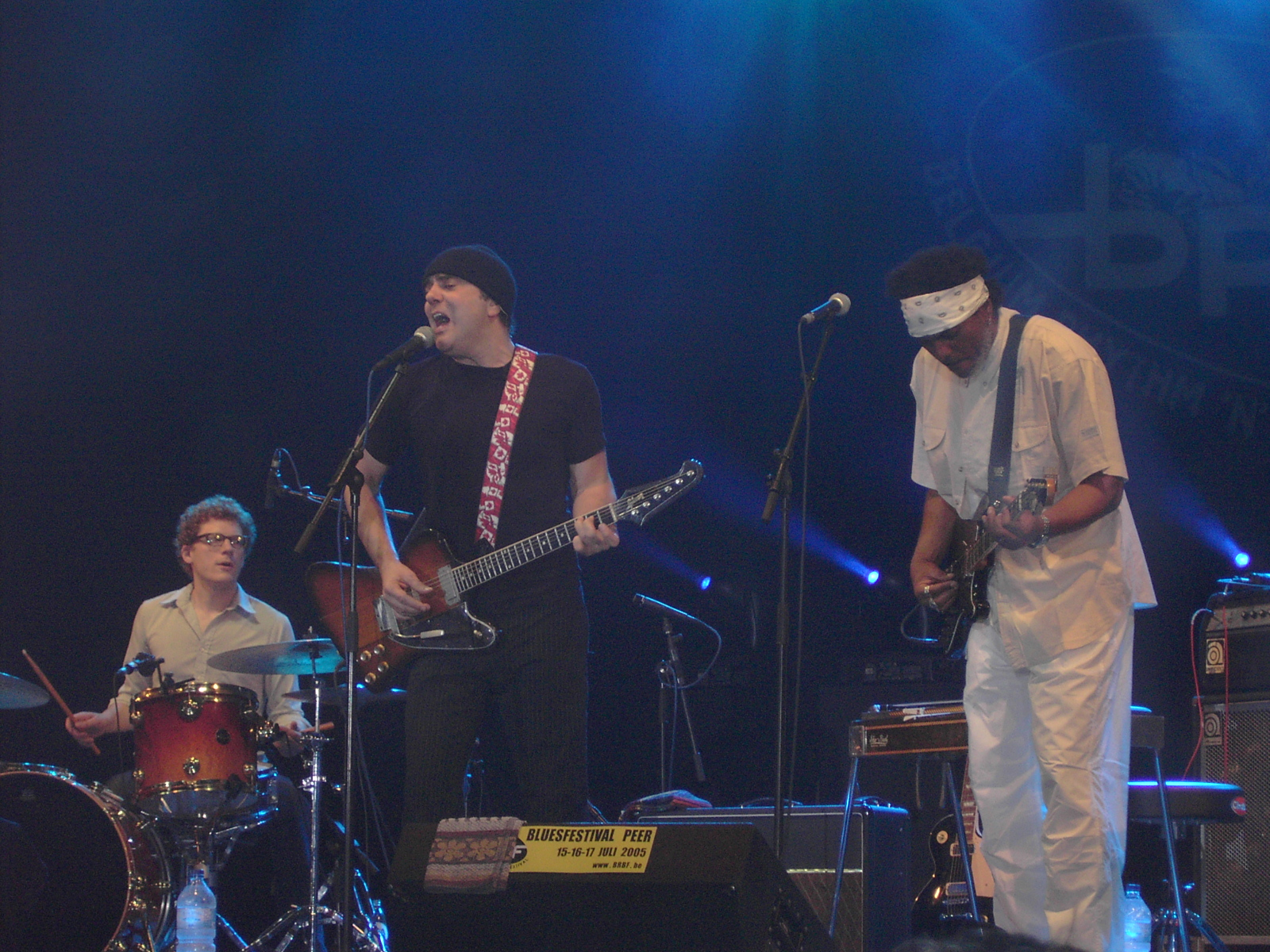
Lanois (centre) performing live

As well as being a producer, Lanois is a songwriter, musician and recording artist. He has released several solo albums and film scores; his first album, Acadie was released in 1989. A number of Lanois' songs have been covered by other artists, including Dave Matthews, Jerry Garcia Band, Willie Nelson, Tea Party, Anna Beljin, Isabelle Boulay, and Emmylou Harris. His albums have had some success, particularly in Canada. Lanois plays the guitar, pedal steel, and drums. Belladonna, an instrumental album released in 2005 was nominated for a Grammy.

Lanois' song "Sonho Dourado" was included in the 2004 Billy Bob Thornton film, Friday Night Lights. In 2005 with the re-release of his first solo album, Acadie, a late-1980s version of the song appears on the additional tracks called "Early Dourado Sketch". Lanois had performed the song numerous times in the intervening years, including on a Toronto television program in 1993 where it was credited as "Irish Melody" on a recording of the performance. Though the melody does indeed feel Irish, the title is Portuguese and means golden dream. Lanois also provided an instrumental score for LOUDquietLOUD, a 2006 documentary about the Pixies.

Lanois premiered a documentary entitled Here Is What Is at the Toronto International Film Festival in 2007. The film chronicles the recording of his album of the same name and includes footage of the actual recording. The album Here Is What Is was released, first by download, then on compact disc, in late 2007 and early 2008. Soon after that, Lanois released a three-disc recording called Omni.

In October 2009, Lanois started a project called Black Dub which features Lanois on guitar, Brian Blade on drums, and Daryl Johnson on bass, along with multi-instrumentalist/singer Trixie Whitley. They released a self-titled album in 2010. In 2014, Lanois played with Emmylou Harris as a sideman and opening act on a tour focused on the Wrecking Ball material he produced.

=== Solo career ===
On October 28, 2014, Lanois released an album titled Flesh and Machine on ANTI- Records, based on Brian Eno's ambient albums. The instrumental album consists primarily of original atmospheric and process-based sounds, blending pedal steel guitar and a variety of digital and analog sound processing devices. He was assisted by the drummer Brian Blade. In 2016, he released the album Goodbye to Language with Rocco Deluca.

The collaborative album Venetian Snares x Daniel Lanois was released on Venetian Snares' label Timesig in May 2018.

Lanois also contributed to the composition and production of the soundtrack for the 2018 video game Red Dead Redemption 2, released by Rockstar Games. He was given seven composition credits, including one for the song "Table Top".

== Awards ==
Lanois was invested in the Order of Canada in 2018. Lanois has received seven Grammy Awards for his work with various artists, including Bob Dylan, U2, Emmylou Harris and Neil Young, and several Juno Awards and nominations.

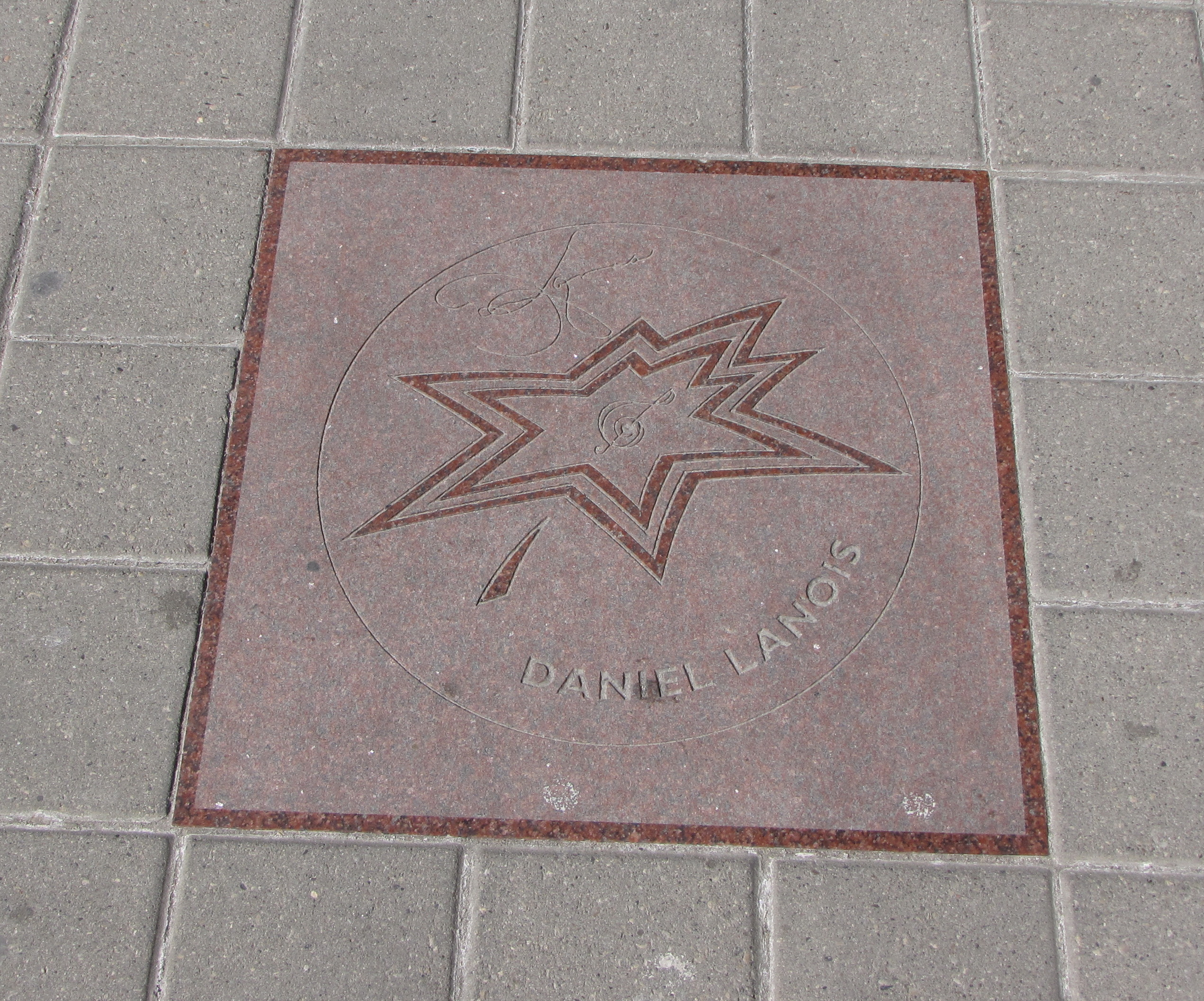
Daniel Lanois' star on Canada's Walk of Fame

In 2005, he was inducted into Canada's Walk of Fame. In June 2013, he received a lifetime achievement award at the Governor General's Performing Arts Awards.

== Discography ==
=== Studio albums ===
Title	Released	Label	Formats
Acadie	September 26, 1989	Opal, Warner Bros.	LP, streaming, CD, cassette
For the Beauty of Wynona	March 23, 1993	Warner Bros.	LP, streaming, CD, cassette
Shine	April 22, 2003	Anti-	LP, streaming, CD
Belladonna	July 12, 2005	Anti-	LP, streaming, CD
Here Is What Is	December 15, 2007	Red Floor	Digital download, streaming, CD
Flesh and Machine	October 27, 2014	Anti-	LP, digital download, streaming
Heavy Sun	March 19, 2021	Maker Series	Digital download, streaming
Player, Piano	September 23, 2022	BMG, ADA	LP, digital download, streaming, CD
Belladonna Nocturne	June 19, 2026	Arts Music	LP, digital download, streaming, CD

=== Collaborative albums ===
Title	Released	Label	Formats
Black Dub	September 2010	Jive Records	LP, CD, streaming
Goodbye to Language, (with Rocco DeLuca)	September 9, 2016	Anti-	LP, digital download, streaming, CD
Venetian Snares x Daniel Lanois	May 4, 2018	Timesig, Planet Mu	LP, digital download, streaming, CD

=== Live albums ===
Title	Released	Label	Formats
Harvest Festival 2011	2011	Self-released	CD
Omni Series	2008	Red Floor	CD

=== Compilation albums ===
Title	Released	Label	Formats
Rockets	2004	Self-released	CD
My Music for Billy Bob	2014	Self-released	CD

=== Soundtracks ===
- Trip: Soundtrack Collection (self-released, 1993) – compilation
- Sweet Angel Mine (1996)
- Lost in Mississippi (1996)
- Sling Blade (1996)
- All the Pretty Horses (unreleased, 2000)
- Red Dead Redemption 2 (2018) – game

== Videography ==
Year	Title	Description
1993	Rocky World	Documentary about Lanois' music and travels in the early 1990s.
2007	Here Is What Is	Documentary about the creation of the album Here Is What Is

== Production credits ==
Production credits
Year	Album	Artist	Notes
1974	Demo	Simply Saucer	not released commercially until 1989 album Cyborgs Revisited
1976	Blues and Sentimental	Jackie Washington	As "Dan Lanois"
1977	Hobo's Taunt	Willie P. Bennett	Engineered as "Dan Lanois," with Bob Lanois
1977	More Singable Songs	Raffi	Recording credit as "Dan Lanois"
1978	Can't Wait For Summer	Ron Neilson	
1978	Choice Cuts	Crackers	As "Dan Lanois"
1979	Desperate Cosmetics	Scott Merritt	
1980	The Millionaires (EP)	The Millionaires	As "Danny Lanois", included two members of Teenage Head
1980	Baby Beluga	Raffi	Mixer, engineer
1981	This is the Ice Age	Martha and the Muffins	
1981	Dream Away	Bernie LaBarge	
1982	Mama Quilla, KKK, Angry Young Woman	Mama Quilla II	3-song 12" Album
1982	Dance After Curfew	Nash the Slash	
1982	Ambient 4: On Land	Brian Eno	Engineered as "Danny Lanois"
1983	Danseparc	Martha and the Muffins	
1983	Apollo: Atmospheres and Soundtracks	Brian Eno	
1983	Parachute Club	Parachute Club	
1984	The Pearl	Harold Budd and Brian Eno	
1984	Mystery Walk	M + M	
1984	The Unforgettable Fire	U2	
1984	Secrets and Sins	Luba	
1985	Thursday Afternoon	Brian Eno	
1985	Hybrid	Michael Brook	
1985	Birdy	Peter Gabriel	
1985	Voices	Roger Eno	
1986	Power Spot	Jon Hassell	
1986	So	Peter Gabriel	
1987	The Joshua Tree	U2	
1987	Robbie Robertson	Robbie Robertson	
1988	Flash of the Spirit	Jon Hassell/Farafina	
1989	Acadie	Daniel Lanois	
1989	Oh Mercy	Bob Dylan	
1989	Yellow Moon	Neville Brothers	
1990	Home	Hothouse Flowers	
1991	Achtung Baby	U2	
1992	Us	Peter Gabriel	
1992	The Last of the Mohicans movie soundtrack		
1993	For the Beauty of Wynona	Daniel Lanois	
1994	Ron Sexsmith	Ron Sexsmith	
1995	Wrecking Ball	Emmylou Harris	
1996	Night to Night	Geoffrey Oryema	
1996	Fever In Fever Out	Luscious Jackson	
1997	Time Out of Mind	Bob Dylan	
1998	Brian Blade Fellowship	Brian Blade	
1998	12 Bar Blues	Scott Weiland	
1998	Teatro	Willie Nelson	
2000	The Million Dollar Hotel: Music from the Motion Picture movie soundtrack		
2000	All That You Can't Leave Behind	U2	
2003	La Bella Vista	Harold Budd	secretly recorded in Lanois Los Angeles living room
2004	How to Dismantle an Atomic Bomb	U2	track "Love and Peace or Else"
2006	Dusk & Summer	Dashboard Confessional	produced with Don Gilmore
2006	loudQUIETloud movie soundtrack		
2007	Back Where You Belong	Sinéad O'Connor	
2007	Let It Go	Mother Superior	
2006	Snake Road	Bob Lanois	
2009	No Line on the Horizon	U2	plus songwriting credits
2009	"Mind Games" & "Night Nurse"	Sinéad O'Connor	
2009	Mercy	Rocco DeLuca and the Burden	
2010	Flamingo	Brandon Flowers	
2010	Le Noise	Neil Young	
2012	Honest Mistake	Jim Wilson	
2012	Battle Born	The Killers	co-writer on tracks "The Way It Was", "Heart of a Girl", and "Be Still"
2014	Rocco Deluca	Rocco Deluca	
2019	Red Dead Redemption 2 video game soundtrack That's The Way It Is	various artists	produced at Lakeshore Records
2025	Pink Elephant	Arcade Fire	

== Collaborations ==
- Peter Gabriel, So (Charisma, 1986)
- Robbie Robertson, Robbie Robertson (1987)
- Bob Dylan, Oh Mercy (1989)
- Peter Gabriel, Us (1992)
- Emmylou Harris, Wrecking Ball (1995)
- Ron Sexsmith, Ron Sexsmith (1995)
- Bob Dylan, Time Out of Mind (1997)
- Gordon Lightfoot, A Painter Passing Through (1998)
- Natalie Merchant, Ophelia (1998)
- Joe Henry, Fuse (1999)
- Peter Gabriel, Up (2002)
- Solomon Burke, Don't Give Up on Me (2002)
- Emmylou Harris, Stumble into Grace (2003)
- Brandon Flowers, Flamingo (2010)
- Leonard Cohen, Thanks for the Dance (2019)
- Annie Barbazza, Vive (2020)

== See also ==
- Canadian Music Hall of Fame
- List of ambient music artists
- Music of Canada
