= Martha Johnson (singer) =

- Born: December 18, 1950 (age 75); Toronto, Ontario, Canada
- Genres: Art rock; new wave; art pop; punk-funk; dance-pop
- Occupation: Musician
- Instruments: Vocals; keyboards
- Years active: 1977–present
- Website: marthaandthemuffins.com

Martha Johnson (born December 18, 1950) is a Canadian rock singer, keyboardist, and songwriter. She is best known as the vocalist of the 1980s rock band Martha and the Muffins.

== Early life ==
Johnson was born on December 18, 1950, in Toronto, Ontario.

== Career ==
Johnson worked in Toronto as a medical receptionist. She started her career playing the organ with cover band "Oh Those Pants". She then was part of Toronto band the Doncasters in the early 1970s. Johnson joined David Millar, Mark and Tim Gane, and Carl Finkle to form the band Martha and the Muffins in 1977. The band, later known as M + M, released an international hit single with "Echo Beach", with Johnson as lead singer. In 1985, she and her husband and bandmate Mark Gane were presented with a CASBY award for their production work with the group.

Johnson also released Songs from the Treehouse, a solo children's album, in 1997 for which she won the Juno Award for Best Children's Album at the Juno Awards of 1997.

In 2001, Johnson was diagnosed with Parkinson's disease, but continues to perform and to raise awareness in her shows. In 2013, Johnson recorded an album called Solo One with a portion of the proceeds going to the Michael J. Fox Foundation.

In 2016, Johnson participated in the Rock Steady boxing program, which promotes fitness for those living with Parkinson's disease.

In 2022, Johnson provided a pop cultural recommendation in an article appearing in Toronto Life. She recommended watching Ricky Gervais' After Life television series on Netflix.

== Discography ==
=== Solo albums ===
- 1995: Songs from the Treehouse (credited as Martha) (Muffin Music)
- 2013: Solo One (Muffin Music)

=== Guest appearances ===
- 1982: Gerry Cott – '"Ballad of the Lone Ranger" (single) (Backing vocals by Martha Johnson) (Epic)
- 1985: Northern Lights – "Tears Are Not Enough" (single) (featuring vocals by Martha Johnson) (Columbia)
- 1985: We Are the World (LP) (includes "Tears Are Not Enough") (Columbia)
- 1996: Jack Grunsky – Jumpin' Jack (features "Home Made Cooking" and "Iko Iko", backing vocals by Martha Johnson) (BMG)
- 1996: Schoolyard Jam (features "My Little Sister" by Martha Johnson and "The Fox", "C'est L'Aviron", featuring Martha Johnson on vocals) (Prologue)
- 1999: Ants in Your Pants (CD) (includes "If I Were Not a Little Kid", credited to Martha) (ZepLenz)
- 2000: Love Starts with the Children (CD) (includes "Santa's Gift of Love" by Martha Johnson) (Wellcraft Music Group)
- 2002: Select Cuts from Echo Beach (features vocals by Martha Johnson) (Select Cuts)
- 2006: Heyday! (film) featuring "Let Go" by Martha Johnson
- 2010: La Bella Stella (features "Shooting Stars" by Martha Johnson) (Recess Music)
