= The Monochrome Set discography =

- Studio albums: 17
- Live albums: 3
- Compilation albums: 14
- Singles: 21
- Video albums: 4

This is the discography of British post-punk/new wave band the Monochrome Set.

== Albums ==
=== Studio albums ===
Title	Album details	Peak chart positions	
Title	Album details	UK	UK Indie
Strange Boutique	Released: April 1980; Label: Dindisc; Formats: LP, MC	62	—
Love Zombies	Released: 17 October 1980; Label: Dindisc; Formats: LP	—	—
Eligible Bachelors	Released: August 1982; Label: Cherry Red; Formats: LP	—	10
The Lost Weekend	Released: 1985; Label: Blanco y Negro; Formats: LP, MC	—	6
Dante's Casino	Released: August 1990; Label: Vinyl Japan; Formats: CD, LP	—	—
Jack	Released: November 1991; Label: Honeymoon; Formats: CD, LP, MC	—	—
Charade	Released: March 1993; Label: Cherry Red; Formats: CD, LP	—	—
Misère	Released: May 1994; Label: Cherry Red; Formats: CD	—	—
Trinity Road	Released: September 1995; Label: Cherry Red; Formats: CD, LP	—	—
Platinum Coils	Released: 23 March 2012; Label: Disquo Bleu; Formats: CD	—	—
Super Plastic City	Released: 17 October 2013; Label: Tapete; Formats: CD,	—	—
Spaces Everywhere	Released: 16 March 2015; Label: Tapete; Formats: CD, LP, digital download	—	—
Cosmonaut	Released: 9 September 2016; Label: Tapete; Formats: CD, LP, digital download	—	—
Maisieworld	Released: 9 February 2018; Label: Tapete; Formats: CD, LP, digital download	—	—
Fabula Mendax	Released: 27 September 2019; Label: Tapete; Formats: CD, LP, digital download	—	—
Allhallowtide	Released: 11 March 2022; Label: Tapete; Formats: CD, LP, digital download	—	—
Lotus Bridge	Released: 13 March 2026; Label: Tapete; Formats: CD, LP, digital download	—	—
"—" denotes releases that did not chart or were not released in that territory.

=== Live albums ===
Title	Album details	Peak chart positions
Title	Album details	UK Indie
Fin	Released: June 1986; Label: Él; Formats: LP	16
Live	Released: May 1993; Label: Code 90; Formats: CD	—
M-80	Released: 8 April 2013; Label: Wienerworld Presentation; Formats: CD, digital download	—
"—" denotes releases that did not chart or were not released in that territory.

=== Compilation albums ===
Title	Album details
Volume, Contrast, Brilliance... (Sessions & Singles Vol. 1)	Released: May 1983; Label: Cherry Red; Formats: LP, MC
Colour Transmission	Released: July 1988; Label: Virgin; Formats: CD; Reissued in 1995 as Tomorrow Will Be Too Long – The Best of the Monochrome Set
Westminster Affair – Bande Originale du Film	Released: August 1988; Label: Él; Formats: CD, LP
What a Whopper!	Released: 10 February 1992; Label: Richmond; Formats: CD, LP
Black & White Minstrels 1975–1979	Released: March 1995; Label: Recall 2cd; Formats: 2xCD
Compendium 75–95 – A History 1979–95	Released: May 1996; Label: Cherry Red; Formats: CD; Reissued in 2000 as The Best of the Monochrome Set
Chaps	Released: 22 September 1997; Label: Polydor; Formats: CD, MC
The Independent Singles Collection	Released: 10 March 2008; Label: Cherry Red; Formats: CD, digital download
He's Frank... We're the Monochrome Set	Released: 23 November 2009; Label: Cherry Red; Formats: digital download
Early Recordings: 1975–1977 "White Noise"	Released: August 2010; Label: Captured Tracks; Formats: LP
Access All Areas	Released: 30 March 2015; Label: Edsel; Formats: CD+DVD
Volume, Contrast, Brilliance (Unreleased & Rare, Vol. 2)	Released: 25 March 2016; Label: Tapete; Formats: CD, LP, digital download
1979–1985: Complete Recordings	Released: 9 February 2018; Label: Tapete; Formats: 6xCD, 6xLP
Little Noises 1990–1995	Released: 27 March 2020; Label: Cherry Red; Formats: 5xCD

=== Video albums ===
Title	Album details
Destiny Calling	Released: January 1992; Label: Toy's Factory; Formats: VHS, LaserDisc
The Monochrome Set	Released: November 2002; Label: Classic Rock Productions; Formats: DVD
Destiny Always Calls Twice	Released: 25 September 2006; Label: Cherry Red Films; Formats: DVD
M-80	Released: 15 April 2013; Label: Wienerworld Presentation; Formats: DVD

== Singles ==
Title	Year	Peak chart positions		Album
Title	Year	UK	UK Indie	Album
"He's Frank"	1978	—	—	Non-album singles
"Eine Symphonie des Grauens"	1979	—	—	Non-album singles
"The Monochrome Set"	1979	—	—	Non-album singles
"He's Frank" (Slight Return)	1979	—	13	Non-album singles
"The Strange Boutique"	1980	—	—	Strange Boutique
"405 Lines"	1980	—	—	Love Zombies
"Apocalypso"	1980	—	—	Love Zombies
"Ten Don'ts for Honeymooners"	1981	—	—	Non-album single
"The Mating Game"	1982	—	—	Eligible Bachelors
"Cast a Long Shadow"	1982	—	—	Non-album single
"The Jet Set Junta"	1983	—	19	Eligible Bachelors
"The Ruling Class" (Spain promo-only release)	1984	—	—	Eligible Bachelors
"Jacob's Ladder"	1984	81	—	The Lost Weekend
"Wallflower"	1985	97	—	The Lost Weekend
"Killing Dave"	1991	—	—	Jack
"Forever Young"	1993	—	—	Charade
"I Love Lambeth"	1995	—	—	Trinity Road
"Waiting for Alberto" (Japan limited-only release)	2012	—	—	Platinum Coils
"Iceman"	2015	—	—	Spaces Everywhere
"Come to Me, Oh, My Beautiful" (promo-only release)	2019	—	—	Fabula Mendax
"Mrs Robot"	2019	—	—	Non-album single
"—" denotes releases that did not chart or were not released in that territory.
