= List of people from Watford =

This is a list of notable people from Watford, a town and borough in Hertfordshire, England, 15 miles (24 km) northwest of central London. People on this list may have been born in Watford or resided there for a significant period of time. People whose only connection to Watford is attendance at the Watford Grammar School for Boys or Watford Grammar School for Girls may be found listed as alumni in those articles.

== Actors ==
- Bruce Alexander (1946–), actor, best known as Superintendent Norman Mullet in A Touch of Frost
- Jane Alexander, actress
- Michael Attwell (1943–2006), actor, EastEnders
- Marion Bailey (1951–), actress
- Sue Cleaver (1963–), actress, best known as Eileen Grimshaw in Coronation Street
- Robert Glenister (1960–), actor, Hustle and Spooks
- Adam Godley (1964–), screen and stage actor
- Vinnie Jones, actor and former footballer
- Matt King, actor, comedian and writer
- Rebecca Lacey, actress
- Terry Scott (1927–1994), TV and Carry On actor and comedian
- Paul Terry, former child actor, star of James and the Giant Peach

== Artists ==
- Neil Lawson Baker (1938–), multi-disciplinary artist
- Jonathan Lemon (1965–), cartoonist

== Businesspeople ==
- Steve Easterbrook (1967–), former CEO of McDonald's
- Declan Ganley (1967–), businessman and political activist
- Nick Leeson (1967–), securities trader responsible for the collapse of Barings Bank in 1995

== Entertainers ==
- Michael Bentine (1922–1996), comedian and former Goon
- Cyril Fletcher (1913–2005), comedian
- KSI (born 1993), rapper, actor, boxer and YouTube personality
- Tim Lovejoy, television and radio presenter
- Mary Portas, retail consultant and television presenter
- Chris Stark (born 1987), Radio 1 DJ
- Bradley Walsh, actor, comedian and television presenter

== Journalists ==
- Edgar Anstey (1907–1987), documentary film maker for British Transport Films
- Barbara Amiel (1940–), British-Canadian journalist
- Sean Hoare (1963–2011), entertainment journalist

== Musicians ==
- LTJ Bukem (1967–), drum and bass musician, producer and DJ
- Ray Cooper (1942–), session and touring percussionist
- Gallows, hardcore punk band formed in Watford
- George FitzGerald, electronic artist
- Geri Halliwell (1972–), singer, member of the Spice Girls
- Jesus Couldn't Drum, 1980s pop duo formed in Watford
- Kyla La Grange, singer-songwriter
- Gerald Moore (1899–1987), classical pianist
- Rak-Su, boy band, winners of the fourteenth series of The X Factor, formed in Watford
- The Staves, singer-songwriter trio whose members were born in Watford
- The Hunna, indie rock band formed in Watford

== Politicians ==
- Mo Mowlam (1949–2005), Labour politician
- Mark Oaten, Liberal Democrat politician
- Nat Wei, Baron Wei, politician

== Scientists and academics ==
- Geoffrey Hodgson (1948–), institutional economist and professor at Loughborough University
- Marion McQuillan (1921 – 1998), British metallurgist who specialised in uses for titanium
- Stuart Parkin (1955–), experimental physicist
- Arthur Peacocke (1924–2006), biochemist and Anglican theologian
- Arthur Geoffrey Walker (1909–2001), mathematician who contributed to general relativity theory

== Sportspeople ==
=== Cricketers ===
- Steven Finn (1989–), Middlesex and England cricketer
- Mark Ilott (1970–), former England cricketer
- Nick Knight, cricketer turned commentator
- Jeremy Quinlan (1965–), cricketer
- Robert Simons (1922–2011), cricketer

=== Footballers ===
- Frankie Beckles (born 2007), British Virgin Islands footballer
- Luther Blissett (born 1958), Jamaican-born footballer for several clubs, most prominently Watford
- Tom Carroll (1992–), played for Swansea City
- Jack Collison (1988–), former West Ham United and Wales footballer, now head coach of Atlanta United 2
- Kenny Jackett (1962–), former manager of Wolverhampton Wanderers, former player for Watford and Wales national football team
- Lewis Kinsella, footballer for Colchester United
- Roy Low (1944-), footballer
- Craig Mackail-Smith, Luton Town and Scotland footballer
- Charlie Patino footballer for Arsenal and Deportivo La Coruña
- Paul Robinson, footballer for several clubs including Watford
- Kelly Smith, Arsenal Ladies, England and Great Britain footballer
- Gareth Southgate, manager and former player for England men's national football team
- Ian Walker, former goalkeeper for various teams including England, later football manager
- Arthur Woodward (1906–1984), footballer who spent his entire career at Watford
- Frank Yallop (1964–), former footballer turned manager

=== Others ===
- Reece Bellotti, former Commonwealth featherweight boxing champion
- Chloe Chong, racing driver who currently competes in F1 Academy
- Anthony Joshua, 2012 Olympic boxing gold medalist
- Alex Roy (1974–), professional darts player
- John Taylor (1945–), former rugby player for Wales and British & Irish Lions, later commentator

== Writers ==
- Gurpreet Kaur Bhatti, English Sikh screenwriter and playwright
- T. E. B. Clarke (1907–1989), screenwriter and novelist
- Anthony Berkeley Cox (1893–1971), crime fiction author

== Others ==
- John Lawley, Commissioner in The Salvation Army
- George Pearkes (1888–1984), Canadian politician and soldier
- Mike Pilavachi, evangelist and founder of Soul Survivor
- Barney Chandler, former Royal Marine and current Yeoman Warder Ravenmaster at the Tower of London
