= Love Zombies =

Studio album by the Monochrome Set
- Released: 17 October 1980
- Studio: Sound Suite, Camden Mews, London NW1
- Genre: Post-punk; new wave
- Length: 36:31
- Label: Dindisc
- Producer: Alvin Clark; The Monochrome Set

The Monochrome Set chronology
Strange Boutique (1980)	Love Zombies (1980)	Eligible Bachelors (1982)

Love Zombies is the second studio album by English band the Monochrome Set. It was released on 17 October 1980, through record label Dindisc.

== Track listing ==
Side A
No.	Title	Writer(s)	Length
1.	"Love Zombies"	Bid, J.D. Haney, Lester Square	4:04
2.	"Adeste Fideles"	Bid, Square, Andy Warren	3:48
3.	"405 Lines"	Square	3:16
4.	"B-I-D Spells Bid"	Bid	3:19
5.	"R.S.V.P."	Bid, Square, Haney	3:32

Side B
No.	Title	Writer(s)	Length
1.	"Apocalypso"	Bid, Haney, Square, Warren	3:37
2.	"Karma Suture"	Bid, Haney, Square	4:47
3.	"The Man with the Black Moustache"	Bid, Haney, Warren, Square	3:18
4.	"The Weird, Wild and Wonderful World of Tony Potts"	Bid, Tony Potts, Square	3:26
5.	"In Love, Cancer?"	Square	3:24
Total length:			36:31

== Critical reception ==
Professional ratings
Review scores
Source	Rating
AllMusic	4.5/5 stars
Louder Than War	9/10

Trouser Press described the album as possessing "a smoother and more accessible sound" than the band's debut, "Strange Boutique", praising its melodies, as well as "lyrics that take sharp, light jabs at emotional traps and social mores." AllMusic praised the album, writing that it "features more accomplished songwriting" than the group's previous work.

== Personnel ==
Credits adapted from the album's liner notes.

The Monochrome Set

- Bid – lead vocals, guitar
- Lester Square – lead guitar, EDP Wasp synthesizer
- Andy Warren – bass
- J.D. Haney – drums

Additional musicians

- Alvin Clark – keyboards

Technical

- Alvin Clark – producer, engineer
- The Monochrome Set – producer
- Gill Thompson – cover illustration
