= ...And the Native Hipsters =

English post-punk group

- Also known as: Native Hipsters
- Origin: London, England
- Genres: Experimental, plunderphonics, post-punk, electronic
- Years active: 1979 – mid-1980s
- Labels: Heater Volume Records, MRMusic, Glass Records, Illuminated Records
- Spinoff of: Wildings, Patterns
- Past members: William Wilding; Blatt (Nanette Greenblatt); Robert Cubitt; Tom Fawcett; Lester Square; Annie Whitehead; Ludwina van der Sman; Chris Cornetto; Simon Davidson
- Website: www.nativehipsters.co.uk

...And the Native Hipsters was an English experimental music group formed in London, England in 1979. Centred on the nucleus of musicians William Wilding and Blatt (Nanette Greenblatt), they are best known for their 1980 single, "There Goes Concorde Again", which attracted the attention of BBC Radio 1 DJ John Peel, and reached number five on the UK Independent Charts. The song was listed by New Musical Express in their "NME Writers 100 Best Indie Singles Ever" in 1992.

AllMusic called the Native Hipsters "[o]ne of the more bizarre groups" from the late-1970s and early-1980s.

== Biography ==
...And the Native Hipsters was a London-based duo of musicians William Wilding from Romford England, and Blatt (Nanette Greenblatt) from Cape Town, South Africa. They had previously worked together as the Wildings, and then the Patterns with Robert Cubitt and Tom Fawcett. The Patterns became the Native Hipsters in 1979 when they recorded "There Goes Concorde Again", a 6:45 minute song featuring Blatt repeating with "childlike enthusiasm" the refrain "Ooh, look, there goes Concorde again", with reference to sightings of the famed "silverbird". AllMusic described the song as a "formless composition" with "perfectly-devoid-of-skill vocals, a wobbly funhouse synth, the occasional guitar pling, and not much bass".

"There Goes Concorde Again" was a home recording that was privately released by the group as a single in a limited edition of 500 copies. Each disc had its label hand-stamped by the group, and the sleeves were cut from advertising posters (including one of Kevin Keegan, an English footballer), making each cover virtually unique. They sent the records to Rough Trade, an independent record shop in London, and about a month later BBC Radio 1 DJ John Peel picked up a copy and began playing the song extensively on his radio programme. Soon the group had an order for another 1,000 copies, and then a further 4,000. The song entered the UK Independent Charts in August 1980, where it remained for ten weeks, peaking at number five. Wilding received an offer from producer Tony Visconti to re-record the song, but turned it down for fear of it becoming "too commercial". The song was later listed by New Musical Express in their "NME Writers 100 Best Indie Singles Ever" in 1992.

In 1982 the Native Hipsters released a four-track EP, "Tenderly Hurt Me" which was well received by the music press. Over the next few years the group performed live several times, including opening for Bauhaus, and recorded a number of songs with the help of various musicians, including guitarist Lester Square from The Monochrome Set, and Annie Whitehead, a session trombonist. By the mid-1980s the group had stopped recording, but interest in them was revived in 2001 when Rough Trade included "There Goes Concorde Again" in a box set, Rough Trade Shops – 25 Years. This prompted Wilding to release two CDs, There Goes Concorde Again... (2001) and Songs to Protest About (2006) containing their singles, previously unreleased songs and new material. Interest in the Native Hipsters was renewed again in 2009 when a compilation set, Kats Karavan: The History of John Peel on the Radio included "There Goes Concorde Again". Rock music critic Peter Paphides said in a review of the album that ...And the Native Hipsters was one of the artists always associated with John Peel.

William Wilding went on to perform as comedy act Woody Bop Muddy.

== Discography ==
Source: Discogs

=== Singles and EPs ===
- "There Goes Concorde Again" (1980, 7" single, Heater Volume Records)
- "Tenderly Hurt Me" (1982, 12" EP, Glass Records and Illuminated Records co-release)
- "Going Steady With Larry and Emma" (1983, 7" single, Plattekop Volume)

=== Albums ===
- There Goes Concorde Again... (CD, 2001, MRMusic)
- Songs To Protest About (CD, 2006, MRMusic)
- Original Copy (CD, 2012, MRMusic)

=== Compilation appearances ===
The following compilations each include one track by ...And the Native Hipsters, "There Goes Concorde Again".

- Various artists: Rough Trade Shops – 25 Years (2001, 4xCD box set, Mute Records)
- Various artists: Kats Karavan: The History of John Peel on the Radio (2009, 4xCD, Universal)
