= Strange Boutique =

Strange Boutique may refer to:

- Strange Boutique (band), a band from Washington, D.C.
- Strange Boutique (album), a 1980 album by The Monochrome Set
