= Blunck =

Blunck is a surname. Notable people with this surname include:

- Aaron Blunck (born 1996), American freestyle skier
- Andreas Blunck (1871–1933), German politician
- Christian Blunck (born 1968), German field hockey player
- Ditlev Blunck (1798–1853), Danish-German painter
- Hans-Friedrich Blunck (1888–1961), German jurist
- Timo Blunck (born 1962), German musician
- Øivind Blunck (born 1950), Norwegian actor
