= Timo Blunck =

German composer and musician

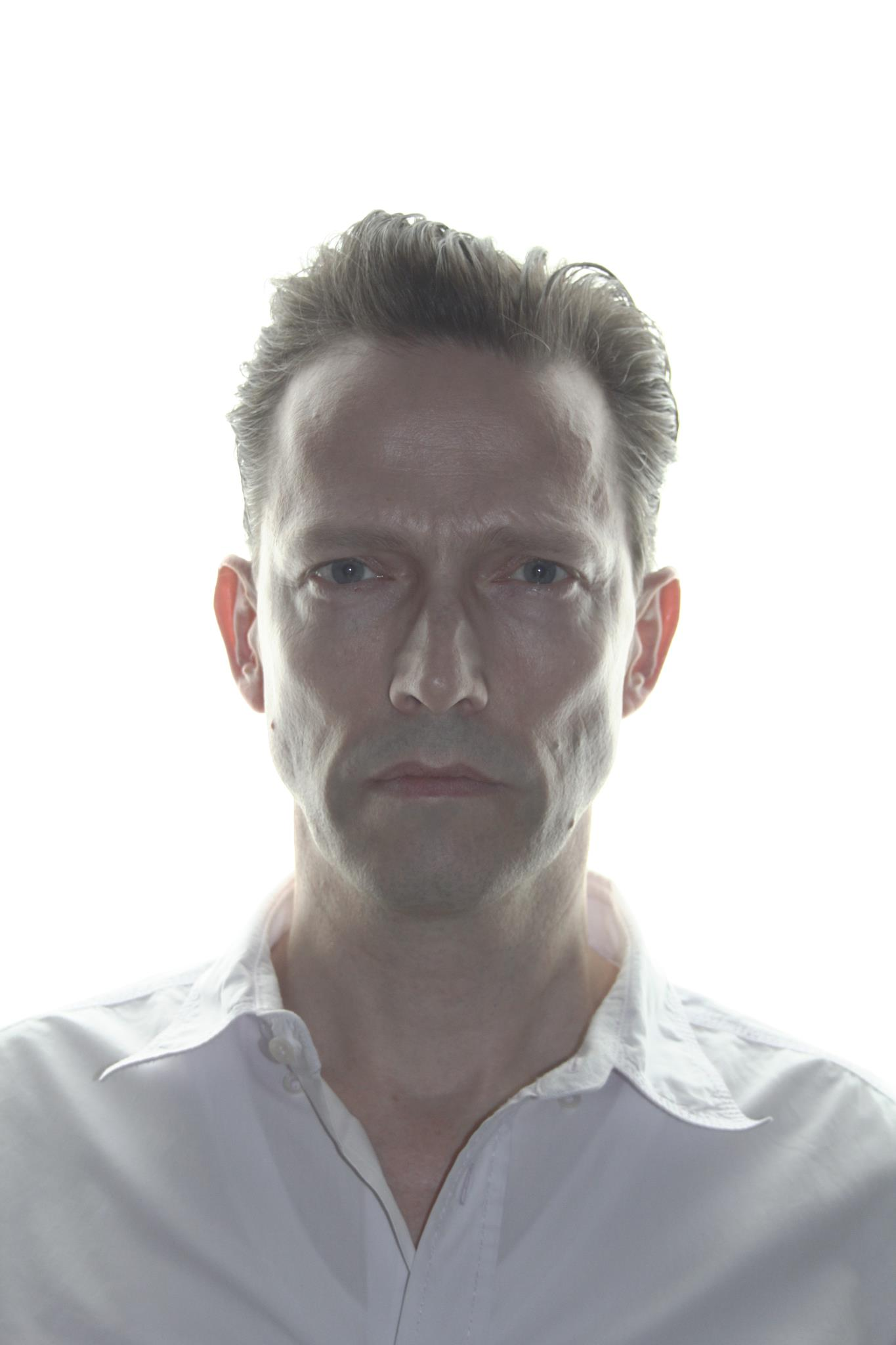

Background information
- Born: 25 March 1962 (age 63); Buchholz i. d. Nordheide, Germany
- Origin: Hamburg, Germany
- Genres: Neue Deutsche Welle
- Occupation(s): Composer, vocalist, producer
- Instrument(s): Bass, guitar
- Years active: 1978–present
- Labels: Tapete Records
- Website: www.blut.audio

Timo Blunck (born 25 March 1962) is a German composer, lyricist, producer, bassist and vocalist.

== Biography ==
Blunck was raised in Hamburg. At the age of nine, he began studying flute under Manfred Trojahn.

In 1978, Blunck founded The Skafighter with his school friend Detlef Diederichsen. In 1980, The Skafighter were renamed Ede und die Zimmermänner alongside the release of their first single on Alfred Hilsberg's Zick Zack label (they later simply went by Die Zimmermänner).

In 1981, Blunck became the bassist for Palais Schaumburg, where he also sang backing vocals for the first two albums. His unusual style of bass playing followed geometric patterns, as opposed to classical musical scales. This style was a fundamental part of Palais Schaumburg's atonal sound. Palais Schaumburg featured such producers as The Flying Lizards' David Cunningham, as well as Andy "Coati Mundi" Hernandez of Kid Creole & The Coconuts.

In 1981, Palais Schaumburg signed with Daniel Miller's Mute Records, after which they played support for Depeche Mode.

Palais Schaumburg played in the Danceteria in New York, as well as performing as one of the first acts in Manchester's The Haçienda. On their European Tour 1982 they played with Kurtis Blow.

Photographer and Director Anton Corbijn, having previously created the album artwork for "Lupa" (1982), also filmed their first music video in 1983 for the single "Hockey".

From 1985 to 1990, Timo Blunck performed as the vocalist and songwriter of the Hamburg Pop band Grace Kairos. The Grace Kairos released two albums, produced by Ray Shulman of Gentle Giant. The singles "Carolina" and "I Don't Know What's Going On" charted in the Netherlands and Sweden. In 1990, Grace Kairos toured as the support for Wet Wet Wet.

In 1990, Blunck moved to London, where he opened a studio (Momentum Sounds). There he produced several artists, including Freaky Realistic and Christie Hennessy.

1992 saw the release of Blunck's solo album, titled "Timo", with the single "Louisiana Lonely". the music video of which was filmed by German Director Gregor Schnitzler in Louisiana.

Blunck then moved to Baton Rouge, Louisiana, followed by Los Angeles.

In 1998, Blunck opened the production company BLUWI, which creates music for Film, Television and advertising. BLUWI's clients include directors such as Justus von Dohnanyi and Christian Petzold, as well as brands including Audi, Mercedes, and Nivea.

In 2010, BLUWI began working in communication in space, including the Expo 2010 (Saudi-Arabian Pavilion) and the Expo 2012 in Yeosu (Swiss Pavilion, Caltex Pavilion).

Starting 2011, Blunck resumed playing with Palais Schaumburg, featuring its original lineup. The band's success in Japan led to concerts in Tokyo and Osaka in 2012.

Die Zimmermänner released further albums, the latest of which "Ein Hund Namens Arbeit" was produced by Blunck and released by Tapete Records.

In 2014 Blunck mixed the album "Spaces Everywhere" from the London band The Monochrome Set.

Timo Blunck has been a member of the Art Director's Club Germany since 2002

Summer 2015, Timo Blunck mixed the album Über... Menschen of the Düsseldorf band Fehlfarben.

Following 1 June 2015, Blunck, along with BLUWI producer Stephanie Zanatta, founded the company BLUT. Here they are continuing their work after the termination of BLUWI.

== Personal life ==
Timo Blunck splits his time between Hamburg and New Orleans. He has three sons with American stylist Sondra Blunck.

== Selected discography ==
Ede & die Zimmermänner

- Eva, Jürgen & Max (Single, Zick Zack 1980)

Die Zimmermänner

- Ein halbes Jahr/Kultur (Single, Zick Zack 1981)
- 1001 Wege Sex zu machen ohne daran Spaß zu haben (Album, Zick Zack 1982)
- Zurück in der Zirkulation (EP, Zick Zack 1983)
- Anja (EP, Cherry Red 1983)
- Goethe (Album, AtaTak 1984)
- Fortpflanzungssupermarkt (Album, Zick Zack 2007)
- Ein Hund namens Arbeit (Album, Tapete 2014)
- Die Wäscheleinen waren lang (Boxset Retrospektive 1980–1985, Tapete 2014)

Palais Schaumburg

- Telefon (Single, Zick Zack 1981)
- Palais Schaumburg (Album, Phonogram/Mute 1981)
- Lupa (Album, Phonogram 1982)
- Hockey (EP, Phonogram 1983)
- Palais Schaumburg (Doppelalbum Re-Issue, Bureau B 2012)

Grace Kairos

- Fall In Love With Frank (Album, RCA 1987)
- Emotionspark (Album, RCA 1989)

Solo

- Timo (Album, RCA 1992)

== Selected filmography ==
- 2004: Außer Kontrolle (Director: Christian Görlitz)
- 2007: Bis zum Ellenbogen (Director: Justus von Dohnányi)
- 2008: Tatort: Unbestechlich (Director: Nils Willbrandt)
- 2012: Blood Eagle (Director: Nils Willbrandt)
- 2013: Tatort: Schwindelfrei (Director: Justus von Dohnányi)
- 2014: Junges Deutschland (Director: Jan Hinrik Drevs)

== Selected awards ==
- Goldener Nagel for sound design 'Loewe – Chor', ADC 2009
- Red Dot Award 2010 Saudi-Arabian Pavillon, Expo Shanghai
- DDC Award 2010 'Im Reich der Schatten', Rheinisches Landesmuseum Trier
- Golden Lion for Music 'Monkey/A Peace Of Mind', Cannes Advertising Festival 2010
- Golden Clio for Music 'Monkey/A Peace Of Mind', New York 2010
- Bronze Clio for Music BMW Scooter 'Modern Movement', New York 2012
- Red Dot Award 2014 'The Time Machine – Wu Kingdom Helv Relics Museum Wuxi, China'
