= Mikey Georgeson =

English artist

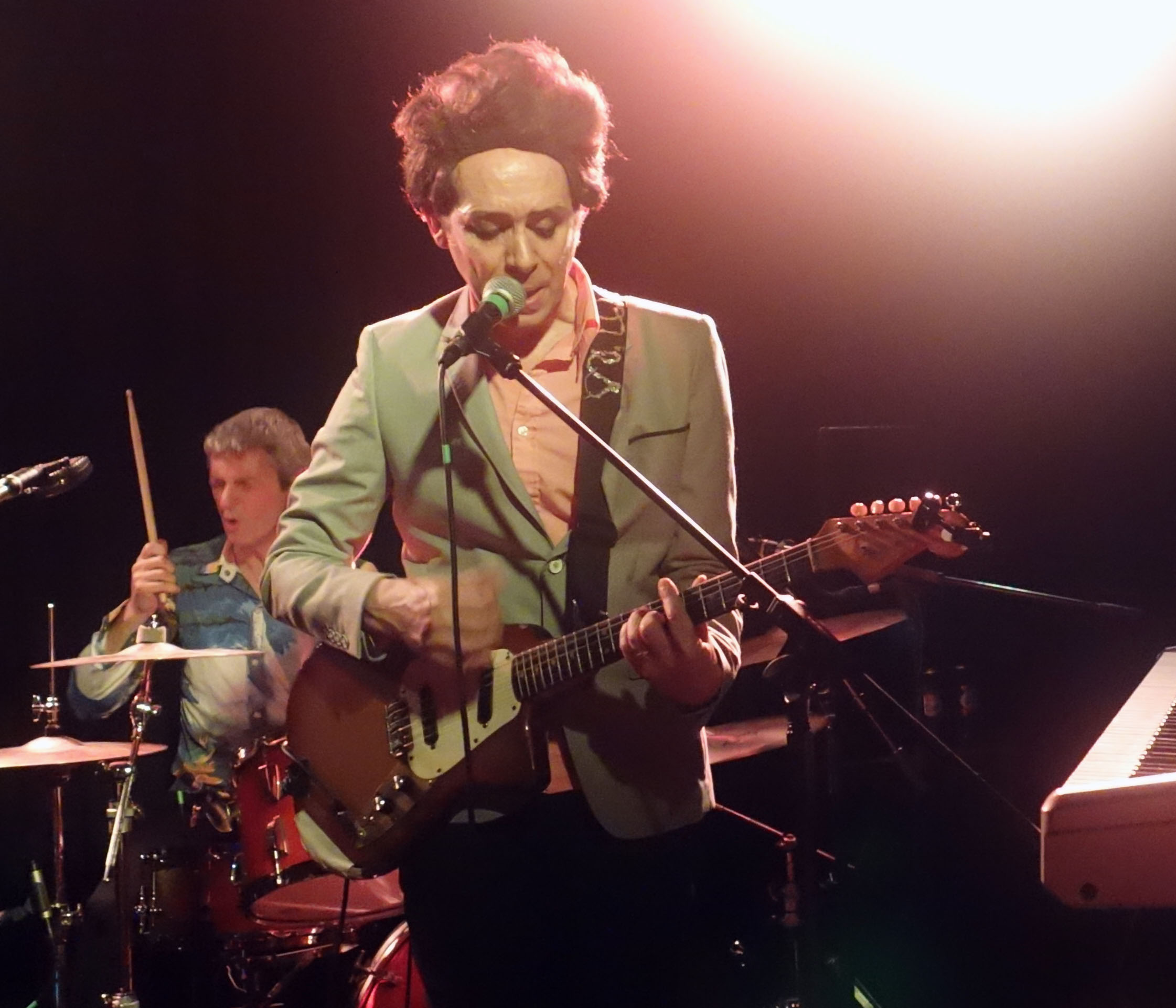
- Georgeson performing as The Vessel with David Devant and his Spirit Wife in December 2014

Background information
- Born: 1967
- Occupation: Media artist

Mikey Georgeson (born 1967) is an English artist, working in various media. He is a painter and illustrator, who regularly exhibits his work at Sartorial Contemporary Art and other galleries. As "the Vessel", he is songwriter and singer of the cult art-rock band, David Devant and his Spirit Wife. Side projects have included Carfax, a collaboration with Jyoti Mishra, Glam Chops, a glam rock band formed with Eddie Argos of Art Brut, This Happy Band and Mikey Georgeson and the Civilised Scene. Georgeson has also performed and recorded on his own, as Mr Solo. Peter Kimpton, writing in The Guardian praised Georgeson's "impish genius for melody". Ashley Hames, in the Huffington Post, described Georgeson as 'an original British songwriter of lasting quality. He remains a presence somehow transcendent and other-worldly, bringing us songs that seem to have always existed, holding up the mirror to connect us to something we can truly love.'

== Art ==
After a childhood in Bexhill-on-Sea and Horsham, Mikey Georgeson attended Worthing College of Art (1985–86) and Chelsea School of Art (1986–1989), where he studied illustration when it was a figurative painting course. In 1989, he moved to Brighton, for a postgraduate illustration degree at Brighton University (1989–91). As an illustrator, he published a series of quirky screenprinted booklets, which he sold in Brighton gallery shops. A Shady Tale (1993) contained a series of unlikely shadowgraphy images. The Hat He Mistook for His Wife (1993), reversing the title of Oliver Sacks' famous book, showed a fedora hat in various marital situations – covered with confetti, posing for a honeymoon photograph beside the Eiffel Tower, on a caravanning holiday, and being weighed on bathroom scales. Georgeson lectures in art at the University of East London, and is a practising painter. He has exhibited his work in the following group exhibitions: 'Wapobaloobop', Transition Gallery London 2008, 'Legends of Circumstance' Whitecross Gallery London 2009, Bargate Gallery Southampton 2010 and the Liverpool Biennial 2010. In London, he has had three solo shows: 'My Magic Life' Sartorial Art 2008, 'Father, Son & Holy Smoke', Bear Gallery 2009, and 'Tragicosmic' at Sartorial Art in 2010

Georgeson describes his paintings, which use thickly applied bright oil colours, as "a distillation of a desire to capture what I consider to be episodic globules in the glistening, sticky fluid called paint." With My Magic Life, his 2008 exhibition inspired by magic and David Devant, he brought the different strands of his work together. Georgeson explained in the exhibition catalogue:

I believe in magic and the power of following passions to lead to instances of backwards causality. In his autobiography there is an illustration of Devant making a ghost disappear 'in front of a critical audience' which, as a title alone, has parallels to painting pictures if you ask me....About the time Harry Pye first suggested time was right for a Devant themed show, I was sorting through some books I hadn't touched since they had come into my possession via my polymath cousin, Ricky Rhubarb. The first chapter of the first book was a sketch of Augustus John basically saying he was a bit hit or miss but when his work clicked 'one stares at it with amazement as if this were a Maskelyne and Devant trick and one saw a box floating in mid air'. My jaw slackened and I read on to discover the next chapter was a poetical tip toe through the dichotomy of magic and science. Reaching for my lighter I found it gone. Coincidence? No I don't smoke any more.

In July 2007, Georgeson began to create a drawing every morning on waking, beginning to draw before he knew what the image would become. He posted them on Instagram and, in 2023, the first two months' drawings were published as a book, The Early Morning Drawings, by the Portuguese publisher, Stolen Books. In his introduction, Georgeson described the project as a "trance-ritual":

Looking through them I rediscovered a feeling of emergence that has compelled me back into region of the trance-ritual every morning....They are an expression of fury at the oppressors of lazy joy who insist on the taxonomies of fixed, pregiven ideas. Nothing is really a discrete concept and entanglement is a bio-social fact if only we could inhabit our emerging fiction. The morning drawings are a way to remind myself of the feeling of immanence in daring to explore the less good idea instead of waiting for the best one.

In June 2012, Georgeson exhibited a new solo show, 'Trope' at the Royal Standard in Liverpool. According to the gallery website, Georgeson identifies the 'Trope' as 'the crack that opens between the audience (life) and the artist (art). Eleven paintings in the show focus on Georgeson's ongoing love of Liverpool Football Club as a trope through which he can explore 'sending an emissary from his adult rational self to mix with the transcendental awe of his childhood'. He taps into memories of his boyhood bedroom in which his father had created a large scale recreation of the Kop, pasted together with faces cut from the Observer Magazine.'

In 2014, Georgeson began a doctorate in fine art, which he was awarded by the University of East London in 2019. His doctoral thesis, The Vision of the Absurd, Aesthetic Machines, Entanglement and Affect, looked at the ways in which 'art has an excess that delivers understanding outside of conceptual cognition'. In June 2015, he exhibited his first year paintings in the 'East London Artists' show at the UEL. At the opening, he staged a live performance with the accordionist, Martin White, singing the song "Is David Bowie Happy?". Georgeson explained, 'The show explores the idea that David Bowie saved his disciples from anomie (Is there life on Mars?) but potentially at the cost of the individuation of his psyche. In the face of the vacuum of meaning created by post-history culture, rather than resorting to appropriate irony, meaning becomes the mystery of creation itself.'

As a tutor at UEL, Georgeson created the Dewey Decimal Dowsing Project, which "began as a way to make the library more engaging and accessible to new art students and also bring practice and research closer." Students were asked to convert their name into a numerological value, used in the Dewey Decimal library code to locate a shelf in the library. Using dowsing, the student would then select three books, create a clay effigy "to process the encountered knowledge" and then write "a simple scientific report (Title, Apparatus, Method, results, Conclusion)."

== The Deadends ==
The Deadends is a 'made up culture', which Georgeson has investigated in a series of exhibitions, printed matter, and a film, The Deadends – in Search of Truth. This was shown at the ICA in May 2016, as part of Film is Dead - 100 Years of Dada. On the Deadends website, Georgeson asks, 'Who or what were the Deadends or deadEnds depending on whom you’re speaking to? What exactly is the meaning behind the signature shapes and forms analysts have chosen to name them after?....Unfortunately the deadends left behind no written evidence or documentation of their culture or thought process leaving scholars to project or speculate as to the exact structure of their intended passage through their geographic specificity.'

On 23 February 2017, Georgeson held a celebration of the Deadends in the Studio One Gallery in Wandsworth. Alongside artefacts (abstract paintings and sculptures), the event featured 'speculative enactment as well as...the first ever discoveries of... artifacts.'

== The Sensorium ==
Georgeson is co-curator (with Dean Todd) of the annual Sensorium art show in east London. This event exhibits alongside the Affect and Social Media conferences organised by the digital media critical theorist Tony D Sampson. Georgeson's work also features prominently (alongside other Sensorium contributors) in the book Affect and Social Media: Emotion, Mediation, Anxiety and Contagion.

== Cloak of Longing ==
During the pandemic lockdown in 2020, Georgeson made a series of paintings of oversized blue tears, which he called the Case of the Missing Shade of Blue. Georgeson has written that these were "an expression of grief and a feeling of joy in the way the cosmos expresses itself symbolically, tears, leaves, snails, moons, waves, wings, tears. In the procession we express the cosmos as it makes it up as it goes along.” This led Georgeson to wear the paintings as a 'Cloak of Longing', in processional performances including singing and meditation, first in the Container Space at the University of East London and later, in June 2023, in the Liberty station in San Diego, California. Georgeson's essay on the Cloak of Longing can be downloaded from the Laurentian University website.

== Music ==
In Brighton, in May 1992, Georgeson formed his first band, David Devant & His Spirit Wife, with Foz Foster, ex-guitarist of the Monochrome Set, Jem Egerton, a classically trained musician, who played bass, and drummer Graham Carlow. Georgeson took the name for his band from a second-hand copy of My Magic Life, the autobiography of the great English stage magician, David Devant. A Devant show was conceived as an act of invocation, in which the spirit of the late magician would speak through Georgeson, and the songs would summon down the Spirit Wife. In concert, Georgeson performed as "the Vessel", wearing a black pompadour wig and a pencil moustache.

The elaborate stage show created a false impression that the band was a novelty act. But, as a songwriter, Georgeson was easily the equal of any of his Britpop contemporaries. In 1997 the band released their first album, Work, Lovelife, Miscellaneous. Its tour was accompanied by a Channel 4 film crew from The Other Side series. The documentary, shown in 1999, marked a farewell to the first incarnation of David Devant as, in the final sequence, filmed in 1999, Georgeson symbolically set fire to his wig.

In 2001, while Devant were not performing, Georgeson began to work with Jyoti Mishra of White Town, whom he met at a Devant concert. As Carfax, they released two albums, Momento from a Digital Age and Minky Pauve. According to Georgeson, the band took its name from the centre of Horsham where the last public hanging took place.

In 2005, Georgeson began to perform as a solo act. Using the stage name Mr Solo, he accompanied his new songs with backing tapes while playing ukulele, keyboards or acoustic guitar. As Mr Solo, he has released two albums, All Will Be Revealed (2006) and Wonders Never Cease (2009). Mr Solo has performed at live art events, as a member of The School of English Dada and Daniel Lehan's This Happy Band, a group of roving musicians, inspired by medieval troubadours. As part of Margate's 'Dead Season Live Art' festival of 2010, This Happy Band paraded 'around the seaside town, commemorating its past, and the themes of Winter Dormancy, and Glorious Resurrection'. In 2011, in honour of the Royal wedding, he performed with the English School of Dada, at Cabaret Voltaire, the home of Dada, in Zurich. In London, he has appeared at three other live art events: 'Mr Solo' Whitechapel Gallery (2009), 'Return of the Repressed' Portman Gallery (2009) and 'Artist As Scapegoat' Norn Projects (2010).

In 2008, Georgeson collaborated with Eddie Argos to create Glam Chops, inspired by the stomping rhythms of The Glitter Band and the image of Sweet. The critic Simon Price described the new band: "Think Evel Knievel jumpsuits, Red Indian head-dresses and star-shaped warpaint, think lyrics about Bowie vs. Gary rivalry, think parping saxes and stomping stack-heeled beats." The band released a Glam cover of Bruce Springsteen's "Born in the U.S.A.", with a video showing Georgeson and Argos singing the song while driving down the M4. The version was a showcase for their different singing styles, with Argos speak-singing the verses, and Georgeson providing a soaring operatic refrain. There was also a Christmas single, "Countdown to Christmas", released as a free download.

In 2012, Georgeson began to make music with Rob Jones (The Voluntary Butler Scheme), Simon Love, Simon Breed, Arec Koundarjian, Nathan Thomas, Iain McCallum and Ben Handysides. The new band, called The Civilised Scene, released a single "Moth in the Flame"/"Bringing Rocks Back from the Moon" (Corporate Records). In 2013, the band recorded for a new label, Popianosz, releasing a single, "Candy Floss". Georgeson has said, 'With the Civilised Scene there's a similar thought process as with the paintings.' Debut album Blood and Brambles was released in 2014 to positive reviews.

In 2015, Georgeson brought out a retrospective compilation album, The Best of the Vessel, including music recorded throughout his career. Ashley Hames, writing in the Huffington Post, described the album as a 'blinding triumph....it seems that only now are critics reassessing the undeniable pop sensibilities of David Devant & His Spirit Wife. And hearing the songs on this album, it's an absolute wonder that it has taken so long. 'This is For Real' and 'Pimlico' are hidden classics that, back in the day, would have sat comfortably on top of the charts. With hooks that could snare a whale and lyrics packed with pathos, they'd still be perfect additions today. I could repeat that for most of the songs here. This album is that good. There are particular gems: 'Life on a Crescent' is a heartbreakingly delicate and perfectly formed reflection on suburban life. 'Going To London' and 'My Heroine' are quite simply two of the purest pop songs I've ever heard. Best of all though is 'Half of It'. Again, it's a great tune, but significantly it's a new release, and a wonderful sign that even though this album is a retrospective, it shows us that perhaps only now are we really seeing the very best of Mikey Georgeson.'

In 2021, as Mr Mikey, Georgeson released a new solo album, Simply the Best. Its opening song, 'P.A.I.N.' is 'a soulful, atmospheric meander through the question of whether or not pleasure needs the shadow of pain to be felt. The track’s meaning is perhaps more resonant because, like Lady Gaga, Mikey suffers from the pains of fibromyalgia syndrome.'. The album also included cover versions of David Bowie's 'Ashes to Ashes' and Charlie Chaplin's 'Smile'.

== Publications ==
- Georgeson, Mikey (1991). A List of Lives. M Press. ISBN 0-9518037-0-0.
- Georgeson, Mikey (1993). A Shady Tale. M Press.
- Georgeson, Mikey (1993). From the Heart. M Press.
- Georgeson, Mikey (1993). The Hat He Mistook for His Wife. M Press.
- Georgeson, Mikey (1994). David Devant and His Spirit Wife. A Magic Egg Comic.
- Georgeson, Mikey (2023). The Early Morning Drawings. Stolen Books.

== Discography ==
=== Albums ===
David Devant and His Spirit Wife

- Don Spirit Specs Now! (1993) [Cassette Only]
- Work, Lovelife, Miscellaneous (1997) (Kindness Records)
- Shiney on the Inside (1998) (Kindness Records)
- Power Words For Better Living (2004) (Outstanding Records)
- The Lost World of David Devant (2006) [compilation, download-only]
- Cut Out and Keep Me (2019) (Kindness Recordings)

Carfax

- Momento from a Digital Age (Corporate Records)
- Minky Pauve (Corporate Records)

Mr Solo

- All Will Be Revealed (Outstanding Records) 18 September 2006
- Wonders Never Cease (Outstanding Records) 7 April 2009

Mikey Georgeson and the Civilised Scene

- Blood and Brambles (Popianosz) 11 March 2014

The Vessel

- The Best of The Vessel (Seraglio Point Productions) 2015

Mr Mikey

- Simply the Best (Kindness Recordings) 2021

=== Singles ===
David Devant and his Spirit Wife

- "Pimlico" Humbug Records HUM4 1995
- "Cookie" (Kindness Recordings) 1996
- "Miscellaneous" 7" (Kindness Recordings) 1996
- "Ginger" (Kindness Recordings) 1997
- "This Is For Real" (Kindness Recordings) 1997
- "Lie Detector" (Kindness Recordings) 1997
- "Radar" (Kindness Recordings) 1999
- "Space Daddy" (Kindness Recordings) 2000
- "Contact" (Outstanding Records) OSTRS002 10 May 2004
- "About It" (Outstanding Records) OSTRS003 8 November 2004

Mr Solo

- "Kiss it Better" CDs (Outstanding Records)
- "Number One" CDs (Outstanding Records) 18 September 2006

Glam Chops

- "Countdown to Christmas/Baby Jesus was the First Glam Rocker" 2008
- "Born in the USA" Where It's At Is Where You Are 10 August 2009

Mikey Georgeson and the Civilised Scene

- "Moth in the Flame"/"Bringing Rocks Back from the Moon" Corporate Records 2012
- "Candy Floss" Popianosz 2013
- "Till It's Over" [download]
- "Shine a Light" [download single]
- "Rocks Back From the Moon" [download single]
