= Jonathan Lemon =

American cartoonist

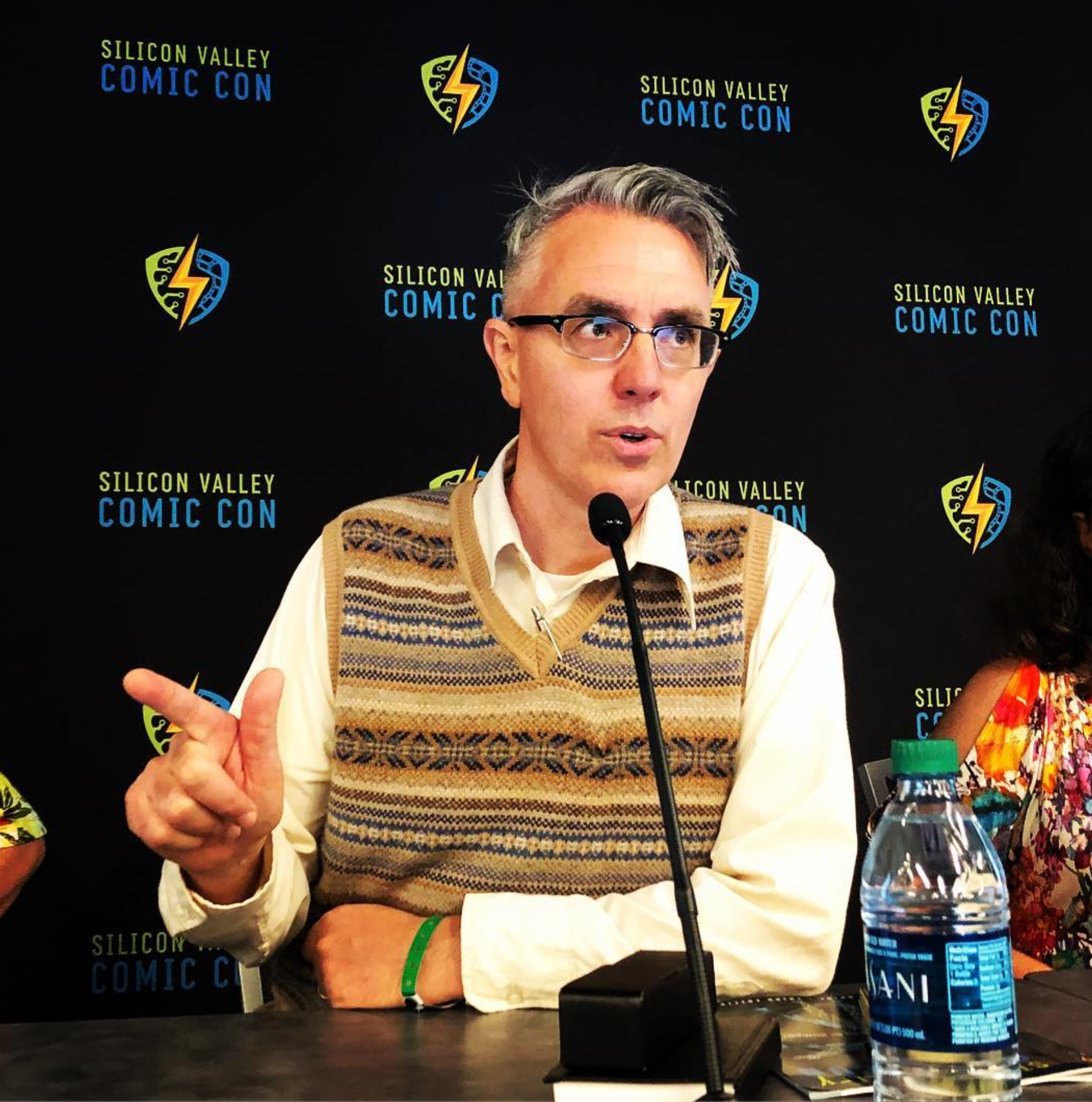
- Lemon speaking at the Silicon Valley Comic Con 2018
- Born: Jonathan Dee Lemon; April 13, 1965 (age 61); Watford, England
- Education: University of Brighton
- Occupations: Cartoonist; Musician
- Years active: 1990–present
- Notable work: Rabbits Against Magic; (2006–present); Alley Oop; (2019–present); Thatababy; (2026–present)

Jonathan Lemon (born April 13, 1965) is a British-American cartoonist and former musician. He is best known for drawing the Alley Oop comic strip.

== Early life and education ==
Lemon was born in Watford, Hertfordshire, England in 1965, and earned a degree in visual and performing arts at the University of Brighton, as well as attending the University of Havana to study Spanish language and Cuban cultural studies.

== Music career ==
In 1984 he formed the pop band Jesus Couldn't Drum with guitarist Peter Pengwyn, and occasionally featuring Lester Square from The Monochrome Set. The band went on to record three albums and had modest indie chart success with their third single "I'm a Train". In 2018, the band's back catalog was acquired by Cherry Red Records.

Two years later, Lemon joined The Chrysanthemums along with Alan Jenkins, leader of The Deep Freeze Mice, and Terry Burrows. A psychedelic art pop band with a large cult following almost entirely outside of the UK, they released four albums and four EPs. In 2010, German music magazine MusikExpress placed them at number 23 in their list of the most under-rated bands of all time.

Between 1984 and 1987 he performed in the surf cabaret band Little Green Hondas, who won the British National Busking Championship in 1986. He also worked as a stand-up comedian in comedy clubs in and around Brighton and London for which he received two Zap Awards and a South East Arts Award.

== Cartooning Career ==
Lemon began working as a cartoonist, first for Poot! Comic, and later relocated to California in 1992 where, as a political cartoonist, his work appeared in the San Francisco Chronicle, the San Jose Mercury and the Boston Globe amongst others. He is a member of the Association of American Editorial Cartoonists and the National Cartoonist Society, where he currently serves on the board.

His long running comic strip Rabbits Against Magic was nominated for a Silver Reuben Award by the National Cartoonists Society in 2012, 2014, and 2021.

In 2019, along with writer Joey Alison Sayers, he took over the drawing duties on the classic comic strip Alley Oop.

On November 17, 2025 he was featured as the guest cartoonist on The Jumble.

His work has been exhibited at the Cartoon Art Museum and the Huntington Beach Arts Center. He has done album artwork for numerous musicians, including Flipper's Guitar, Yukio Yung, and the Thurston Lava Tube. Both Lemon and his comic strips appear in the 2022 award winning documentary feature film "Jack Has a Plan."

On January 1, 2026, he took over the comic strip Thatababy.

== Personal life ==
Lemon lives in San Francisco with his wife and son. He is a lifelong vegetarian.

Between 2003-2005 he served as a Peace Corps Volunteer in Honduras.

He is a big supporter of Richard Thompson's collaborative project Team Cul de Sac which aims to help find a cure for Parkinson's disease.

In 2019 Lemon appeared on the Strangers in Space podcast naming Who Framed Roger Rabbit as his favorite movie. He is also a huge fan of Watford Football Club.

== Selected discography ==
- Jesus Couldn't Drum:
  - Er...Something About Cows (LP, 1984)
  - Good Morning Mr. Square (LP, 1984)
  - Ruttling Orange Peel and Blind Lemon Pie (LP, 1985)
- The Chrysanthemums:
  - Mouth Pain/Another Sacred Day (7" 1987)
  - Is That A Fish On Your Shoulder or are you just pleased to see me? (LP/CD 1987)
  - The **** Sessions (12" 1988)
  - Little Flecks Of Foam Around Barking (CD/2x LP 1988)
  - Picasso's Problem/Live at London Palladium (12" 1990)
  - Porcupine Quills (LP/CD 1991)
  - Odessey and Oracle (LP/CD 1992)
  - Chrysanthemums Go Germany/Insekt Insekt (LP/CD/Box 1995)
  - Decoy For A Dognapper! (CD 2022)
