= Palais Schaumburg (band) =

German new wave band

Background information
- Origin: Hamburg, Germany
- Genres: Neue Deutsche Welle, post-punk
- Years active: 1980–1984
- Label: Phonogram Records
- Past members: Holger Hiller; Thomas Fehlmann; Moritz von Oswald; F.M. Einheit; Walter Thielsch; Chris Lunch; Timo Blunck; Ralf Hertwig; Stefan Bauer

Palais Schaumburg was a German new wave band from Hamburg, Germany. The style was classified as Neue Deutsche Welle, and strongly characterized by their avant garde music and dadaistic attitude.

== Overview ==
The band was originally formed in 1980, featuring Timo Blunck, Holger Hiller, Thomas Fehlmann, and percussionist F.M. Einheit. The group's name stands for Das Palais Schaumburg in Bonn, the Cold War era residence of the German chancellor.

Einheit left the group, eventually to join Einstürzende Neubauten, and was replaced by Ralf Hertwig prior to Palais Schaumburg's first full-length album, Palais Schaumburg, which was produced by David Cunningham and released in 1981. Shortly after it was released, Hiller left the band and started his solo career. He was replaced with Moritz von Oswald and vocalist Walter Thielsch.

The group recorded several singles and albums throughout early 1980s, when their avant garde sounds were heavily influenced by funk, especially on the albums Lupa and Parlez-Vous Schaumburg.

They eventually split up in 1984. All the members have been working on their solo careers.

On 21 November 2013, Palais Schaumburg appeared at the Saint Ghetto Festival in Bern, Switzerland.

== Discography ==
=== Albums ===
- Das Single Kabinett (1981)
- Palais Schaumburg (1981)
- Lupa (1982)
- Parlez-Vous Schaumburg? (1984)

=== Singles ===
- "Rote Lichter" (1981)
- "Telefon" (1981)
- "Wir bauen eine neue Stadt" (1981)
- "Hockey" (1983)
