= Louis Philippe (musician) =

- Birth name: Philippe Auclair
- Born: 24 June 1959 (age 65); Normandy, France
- Genres: Chamber pop
- Occupations: Musician; songwriter; record producer; arranger; news correspondent; football journalist
- Years active: 1984–present
- Labels: él; Trattoria; Tricatel; Tapete Records
- Website: louisphilippe.co.uk

Philippe Auclair (24 June 1959), also known by his moniker Louis Philippe, is a French singer-songwriter, musician, news correspondent and football journalist who has been active from the mid-1980s onwards. He is associated with the short-lived él record label, where he served as an in-house writer and producer.

== Solo career ==
Born in Normandy and raised on a fruit farm, Philippe first recorded for Belgian label Les Disques du Crépuscle, under the names "The Border Boys" (the Tribute 12-inch EP, produced by Andy Paley, who had worked with The Ramones and the Modern Lovers previously), and 'The Arcadians' (one single and one album, It's a Mad, Mad World, 1986, later re-released on a variety of labels as Let's Pretend). On the advice of A&R man Mike Alway, Louis Philippe moved to London in late 1986, and soon became one of the major figures of cult indie label él Records (1986–1989), a subsidiary of Cherry Red Records for which he recorded five singles and three albums (Appointment With Venus, 1987; Ivory Tower, 1988; Yuri Gagarin, 1989). He also appeared in one guise or another — as songwriter, arranger, backing vocalist or instrumentalist — on more than half of all the label's releases. él, now considered to be one of the most influential labels of its time, was, however, not a commercial success in the UK; but it scored a string of independent hits in Japan, where Louis Philippe (whose "You Mary You" was él's best-selling single) became an iconic figure for the so-called Shibuya-kei, or 'Shibuya Sound'.

Following the demise of él in 1989, he turned to Japan to pursue his career, with the support of celebrity fans such as Cornelius. A number of albums followed, all of them released on the Trattoria label: Rainfall, 1991; Jean Renoir, 1992, both of them recorded with multi-instrumentalist Dean Brodrick; Delta Kiss, 1993; Sunshine, produced by Bertrand Burgalat, 1994; Jackie Girl, 1996, the first of his records to feature XTC guitarist Dave Gregory; Azure, recorded with the Prague Philharmonic Orchestra, and Nusch, a collection of Francis Poulenc mélodies, 1999. All these albums were conceived and realised with the help of long-time collaborator, pianist and double-bassist Danny Manners. Trattoria's help enabled him to find licenses for these records, first in France, Britain and Spain, then in the US. These critically well-received records consolidated his "cult" status in the indiepop world; a couple of them charted: "L'Hiver te va bien" reached the Top 30 in France in 1994, while "She Means Everything To Me" reached the no.1 spot on the Campus Radio Charts in the US in 1998, following an appearance at New York's CMJ Music Marathon.

== Collaborations ==
Louis Philippe has enjoyed a parallel career as an arranger, producer and instrumentalist since the late 1980s. The artists he has worked with or for include Valérie Lemercier, April March, P. J. Proby, Martin Newell, Sean O'Hagan of The High Llamas, Mathilde Santing, Towa Tei, Nina Morato, Cinnamon (Swedish band), Humbert Humbert, Laïla Amezian, La Buena Vida, The Clientele, Keiichi Suzuki and Hirokazu Tanaka (contributing to the arranged soundtrack for the Famicom video game Mother in 1989.), Big Big Train (the albums English Electric Part One and English Electric Part Two), Ralegh Long, Bertrand Burgalat and others. A collaboration of note was the album 9th & 13th (Tricatel, 2001), in which he teamed up with Danny Manners and novelist Jonathan Coe, to produce musical settings for the latter's writings. Jonathan Coe, who had contributed the sleevenotes to Azure, and had used a verse of his song "Yuri Gagarin" as an epigraph for his best-seller What a Carve Up!, has also written a number of lyrics for him since My Favourite Part of You (2002).

== Recent projects ==
Louis Philippe has worked with Young Marble Giants leader Stuart Moxham since the 1990s; the duo have played a number of live dates and released a CD, The Huddle House, in 2007. That CD was released on Auclair's own record label, Wonder Records, in London. Louis arranged and co-produced Louise Le May's debut CD Tell Me One Thing That is New (Folkwit Records) in 2010 and completed the same singer's debut album in April 2015. Releases include My Favourite Part of You (2002) and The Wonder of it All (2004). A live double-album was released in February 2007, followed by a new studio album, entitled An Unknown Spring, in May of the same year. The Ocean Tango, conceived and recorded with Swedish band Testbild!, was released in the autumn of 2010. Another duo album with Stuart Moxham, The Devil Laughs, was released in July 2020 on the Chicago-based tinyGLOBAL Solutions label. His new solo album, Thunderclouds, recorded with The Night Mail, a band which comprises Robert Rotifer, Ian Button and Andy Lewis was released on Tapete Records in December 2020.

== Other activities ==
Louis Philippe is also well known in his native country (under his real name Philippe Auclair) as a football journalist. He has held the position of England correspondent for France Football magazine since 1999 and fulfilled a similar role for news and sports radio RMC Info until 2018. He appeared as French football analyst on Setanta Sports News channel in England, and can be heard regularly on Talksport radio in England, Newstalk radio in Ireland, the BBC World Service, BBC Radio 5 Live, BBC Radio London, BBC Radio Scotland and Football Weekly, a podcast hosted by The Guardian newspaper. His biography of Eric Cantona, Cantona — The Rebel Who Would Be King (Macmillan publishing) was long-listed for the William Hill Sports Book of the Year award in September 2009, and was the joint winner of the 'Best Football Book' category of the British Sports Book Awards in March 2010. His second biography, an account of Thierry Henry's life and career entitled Lonely at the Top was also long-listed for the 2013 William Hill Prize. He also wrote a political essay, Le Royaume enchanté de Tony Blair (Fayard, 2006), and was one of the main contributors to the best-selling Dictionnaire du Rock which was published by Robert Laffont in 2000 and to its new and fully revised edition Le Nouveau Dictionnaire du Rock in 2014.
