= Cinnamon (Swedish band) =

Swedish indie pop band

- Origin: Stockholm, Sweden
- Genre: Pop
- Years active: 1994–2000
- Members: Jiri Novak, Frida Diesen, Samuel Laxberg, Christian Ekwall, Per Linden

Cinnamon was a Swedish indie pop / rock band active from 1994 to 2000 and often compared to The Cardigans, Stereolab and Saint Etienne. with influences from European avant-garde movements and orcherstrations.

== History ==
Cinnamon was founded in 1993 by songwriters Jiri Novak and Frida Diesen, who had been making music together in different constellations since 1992. The duo were soon joined by Samuel Laxberg and Christian Ekwall and, later, Per Linden. In 1994, they signed with Soap Records, and their debut EP Vox was released 1995. This was followed the same year by their first album, Summer Meditation (with some co-production from Graham Lewis). Their 1997 album The Courier was accompanied by a tour of Europe and the United States. The Many Moods EP appeared in June 1999, followed in October by the album Vertigo on Soap / MNW Records. The album was produced by Bertrand Burgalat with strings arrangements by Louis Philippe (musician) and was a success. Their final release was the 2000 EP Against the World and Springtime of My Life containing two cuts from Vertigo and three new songs, which was followed by a 2000 tour.

== Discography ==
=== Albums ===
- Summer Meditation (Soap, 1995)
- A Northwest Passage (Soap, 1996)
- Courier (Island / Polygram, 1997)
- Vertigo (Soap, 2000)

=== Extended plays ===
- Vox (Soap, 1995)
- Hopeless Case (Soap, 1996)
- Springtime of My Life (Soap, 1999)
- The Many Moods of Cinnamon (March, 1999)
- Against the World (Soap, 1999)
