= Jesus Couldn't Drum =

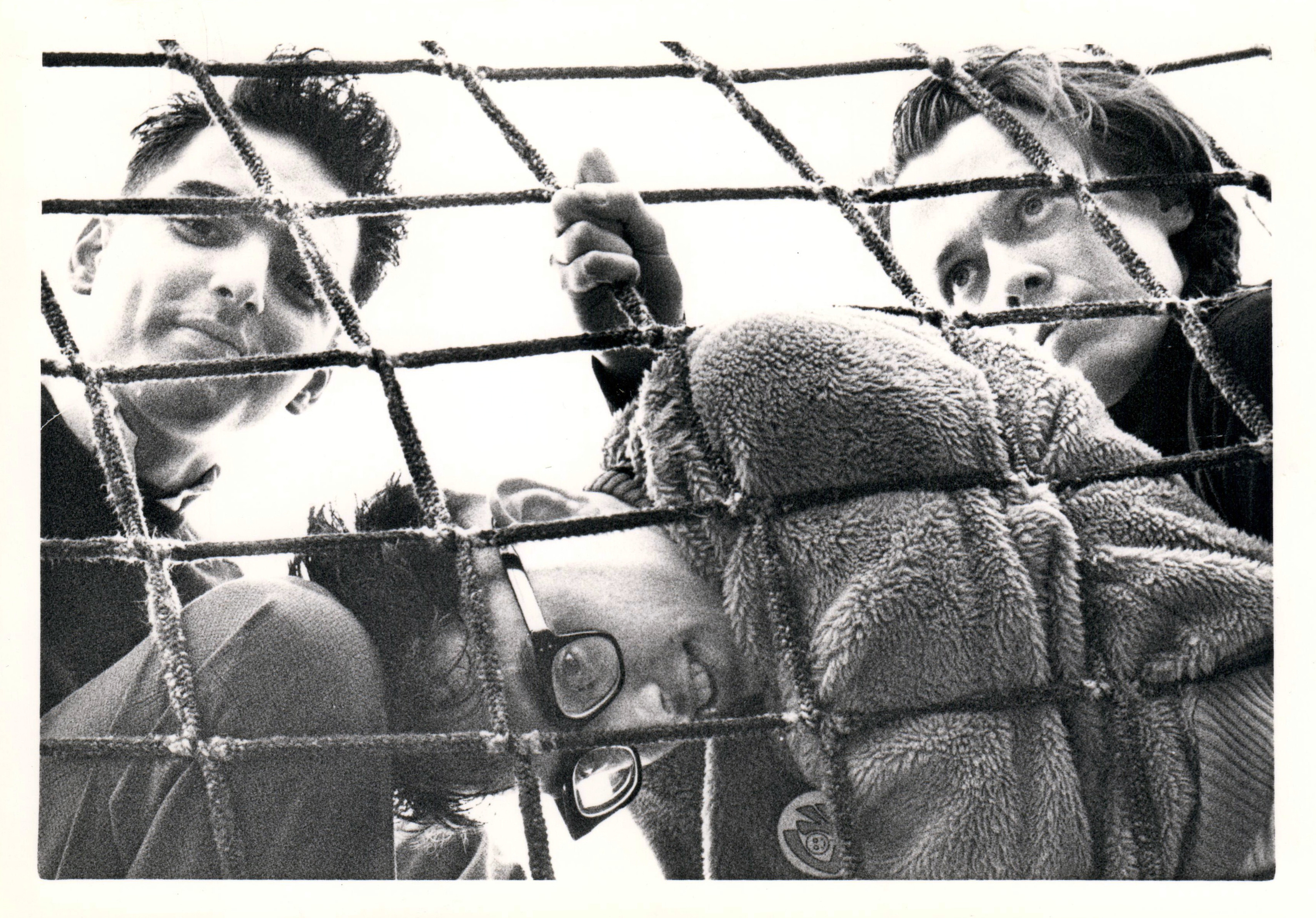
- Jesus Couldn't Drum in 1987

Background information
- Origin: Watford, Hertfordshire, England
- Genres: Post-punk; experimental; art rock; alternative rock; new wave
- Years active: 1980–1988
- Labels: Cherry Red, Lost Moment
- Members: Jonathan Lemon, Peter Pengwyn

Jesus Couldn't Drum were a 1980s eclectic, experimental synth pop duo from Watford, England. They were part of the 80s British loose guitar pop scene and described by Sounds as resembling “The Residents gone crazy in Luton on Eyeless in Gaza demos”. Endless experimentation with cassettes and all kinds of instruments resulted in a "primarily electronic, sometimes alienating soundscape, sometimes cheerfully rocking". They incorporated humor and parody into their songs, similar to the Bonzo Dog Doo-Dah Band. Their theme tune was "two parts Bo Diddley to one part Eighties rockabilly"

Formed by Jonathan Lemon and Peter Pengwyn, they recorded three albums and released three singles on the Lost Moment label, the last of which, “I’m a Train”, achieved moderate indie chart success. They toured extensively in Europe in the mid-eighties, did a BBC Radio 1 session, and were regularly featured on the John Peel and Dr. Demento radio shows. The band's name came from a segment in the Günter Grass novel The Tin Drum.

From the second album—which split a side each between Pengwyn's melodic psychedelic pop whimsy, and Lemon's fractured plinky synth tunes with hints of Syd Barrett weirdness—the duo featured Lester Square of The Monochrome Set on guitar. The band brought in other members, mostly for touring, included Alan Way, Jennie Cruse and Michele Allerdyce from Frazier Chorus.

The one-second song "This is Fun" was recognized by the Guinness Book of Records as being, at that time, the shortest song ever recorded.

The band amicably split in the late 1980s when Lemon moved to Brighton. Pengwyn continued recording as The Cat and Mouse Band, while Lemon joined The Chrysanthemums.

In 2018, the band's back catalog was purchased by Cherry Red, and they feature on the Electrical Language – British Independent Synth Pop 78-84 compilation album, along with The Human League and Orchestral Manoeuvres in the Dark.

== Discography ==
Studio albums

- Er...Something About Cows (1984)
- Good Morning Mr. Square (1984)
- Ruttling Orange Peel and Blind Lemon Pie (1985)

Singles

- "Even Roses Have Thorns" (1984)
- "Autumn Leaves" (1985)
- "I'm a Train" (1985)
