= Annie Whitehead =

British jazz trombone player (born 1955)

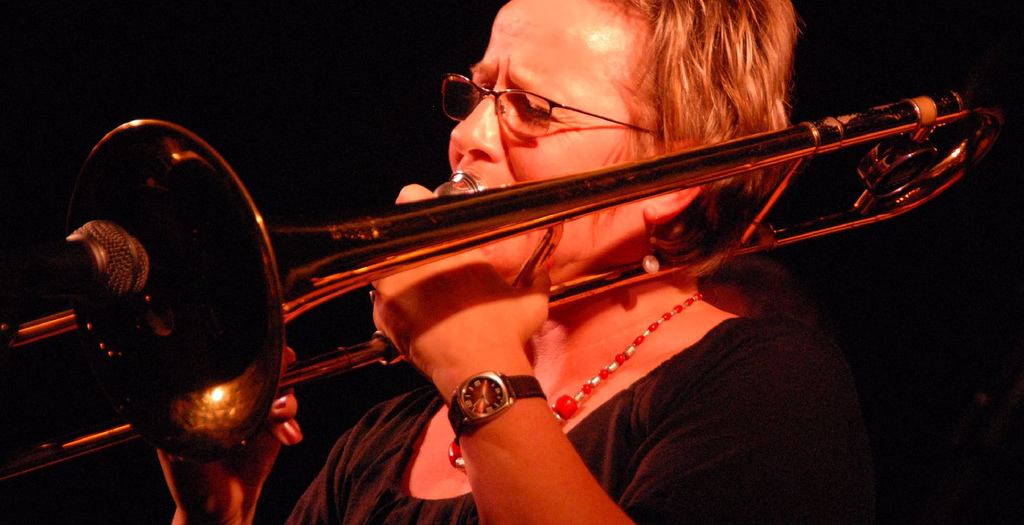
- Photo by Andrew Fawcett

Background information
- Born: Lena Annie Whitehead; 16 July 1955 (age 71); Oldham, Lancashire, England
- Genres: Jazz, big band, ska, pop
- Occupation: Musician
- Instrument: Trombone
- Years active: 1971–present
- Formerly of: Penguin Cafe Orchestra
- Website: www.earthmusic.com/annie.htm

Lena Annie Whitehead (born 16 July 1955 in Oldham, Lancashire) is a British jazz trombone player.

== Career ==
Whitehead learned the trombone in high school and participated in rock and jazz bands. When she was 16, she left school to become a member of a female big band led by Ivy Benson. She played with the band for two years before moving to Jersey. Unhappy with the life of a musician, she quit music for almost six years. She returned in 1979 and started a ska band. She took an interest in jazz again after moving to London two years later and performing in pubs. In the 1980s, she toured with Brotherhood of Breath, a big band led by South African pianist Chris McGregor.

During her career, she has worked with ...And the Native Hipsters, Blur, Carla Bley, Charlie Watts Orchestra, Fun Boy Three, Robert Wyatt, Jah Wobble, Jamiroquai, Elvis Costello, John Stevens, Penguin Cafe Orchestra, Smiley Culture, Chris Rea, Joe Jackson, Steve Beresford, Murray Head, Dr. John, Tom Jones, Khaled, Deep Purple, Étienne Daho, Lol Coxhill, Finlay Quaye, Rufus Wainwright, Maher Shalal Hash Baz, Eric Clapton, Nick Lowe, Boy George, Jasper van 't Hof, Spice Girls, and Working Week. She was a member of The Zappatistas, a Frank Zappa tribute band led by guitarist John Etheridge.

== Discography ==
- Mix Up 1984
- Alien Style 1985
- This is ...Rude 1994
- Naked 1997
- Home
- The Gathering 2000
