= David Devant & His Spirit Wife =

English band

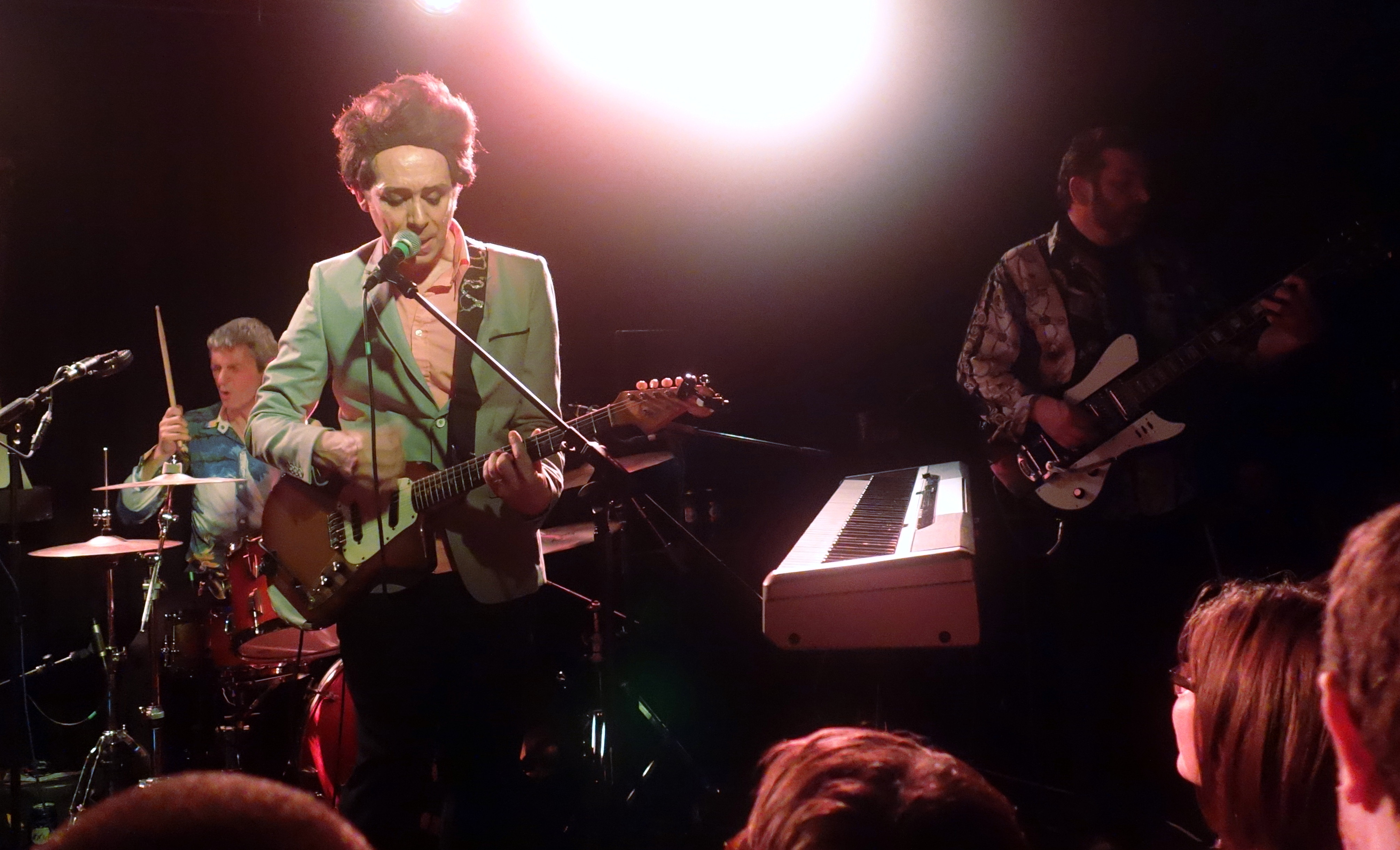
- David Devant & His Spirit Wife performing in December 2014 at The Lexington in London.

Background information
- Origin: Brighton, England
- Genres: Indie rock, art rock, Britpop
- Years active: 1992–present
- Members: Mikey Georgeson; Foz Foster; Jem Egerton; Graham Carlow

David Devant & His Spirit Wife are an English indie/art rock band from Brighton, England. They are named after the English magician and early film exhibitor, David Devant (1868–1941).

== History ==
The band were formed in Brighton in May 1992 by Mikey Georgeson, songwriter, singer, guitarist and keyboard player, Foz Foster, the ex-guitarist of the Monochrome Set, Jem Egerton, a classically trained musician, who played bass, and the drummer Graham Carlow. Georgeson derived the name for his band from a second-hand copy of My Magic Life, the autobiography of the great English stage magician, David Devant (1868–1941). One of Devant's stage illusions was to produce a floating apparition of his ‘spirit wife’. Georgeson told the Sunday Times, "I knew it was lazy just to nick the name, David Devant and His Spirit Wife, so I decided to research the man. I read the book and his nickname at school was the same as mine – Monkey Face… Our motto – like his – is All Done by Kindness.".

Georgeson explained the idea behind the band to the Brighton Punter magazine: "It's quite simple really, as a magician Devant didn't really fulfil himself so he said 'I shall walk down the corridors of contemporary music', so he chose us. I am his vessel."- hence Georgeson's new stage name, The Vessel. The rest of the band also assumed new names: The Colonel (Egerton), Professor Rimschott (Carlow), and Foz? (pronounced 'Foz Questionmark'). The line-up was completed by "the Lantern", who provided film and light, and two "Spectral Roadies", known as IceMAN (Nick Curry) and Cocky Young'un (Gary Smith), who accompanied the music with visual jokes and magic using cardboard props.

In concert, the Vessel, who wore a black pompadour Elvis wig and a pencil moustache, might appear flying on a magic carpet, projected as a shadow on a paper screen, or be sawn in half by the roadies. At one Halloween concert, at the Duke of York's Picture House, Brighton, he was fired out of a cannon from the stage, emerging at the far end of the hall in tattered clothes, his face blackened. The climax of every show was the appearance of the Spirit Wife, manifested in the form of a Victorian lace nightgown waved on a pole, while the audience was instructed, 'Don Spirit Specs Now!'

In 1997, David Devant and His Spirit Wife featured as the house band on Paramount Channel's television series Asylum. They provided the title music and performed a different song in every episode.

After the 1997 release of their first album, Work, Lovelife, Miscellaneous, the Radio One Breakfast DJ, Mark Radcliffe, told the Sunday Times, 'Initially I was intrigued by the look of them, by the name, by the image. Then I heard some really good songs. It certainly helps that they sound like early Bowie. Since most people will never see the band play, unless the records themselves work there is no point to all the theatricality. But this lot are messing about with the concept of what makes a pop band. Their act isn't just a gimmick. We need more bands like them.'

Touring their first album around Britain, the band was accompanied by a Channel 4 film crew from The Other Side series. David Devant and His Spirit Wife, directed by Ashley Hames, was shown in 1999. It marked a farewell to the first incarnation of David Devant as, in the final sequence, filmed in 1999, Georgeson symbolically set fire to his wig.

On 11 December 1999, at The Falcon in Camden, Georgeson unveiled a new David Devant, stripped of the theatricality of the earlier version. The Spectral roadies and the Vessel's wig had gone, and Foz? had been replaced by John Pope on guitar. The accompanying album, Shiney on the Inside, had a harder-edged sound, with driving glam-inspired anthems, "Radar" and "Space Daddy". Eddie Argos, of another art-rock band, Art Brut, would later describe Shiney on the Inside as 'one of the greatest albums ever made.'

In 2002, the original line-up of David Devant reunited, beginning with a concert at Komedia Brighton, on 8 April. A third album was released, 2004's Power Words for Better Living.

On 11 December 2019, the band released their fourth album, Cut Out and Keep Me, on Kindness records, with a show at the Water Rats in London. The Mild Mannered Army review described the album as delivering 'moments of autobiography, philosophy, surrealism and all coated in beautiful arrangements, classic pop hooks, rock and roll history and a tangible sense that all of this has happened because of kindness....“Cut Out and Keep Me” is a return to the bands own past, the closest in sound and presentation to “Work, Lovelife, Miscellaneous” of any of their other albums. Songs like the titular 'Cut Out and Keep Me', 'Here I Am', 'Rough Magic', 'Sublime' and 'Early Worm' are all light on the surface but with darkness lurking in the depths.'

== Side projects ==
Performing as Mr Solo, Georgeson has made appearances as part of This Happy Band, a loose collective of artists, poets and musicians who have performed together at art events including 'Dead Season / Live Art' for Limbo Arts in Margate and Nunhead Open Exhibition 2009 and 2011.

Georgeson is a lecturer at the University of East London, and has produced artwork shown by Sartorial Contemporary Art and Dulwich Picture Gallery.

== Personnel ==
=== Current line-up ===
- The Vessel (Mikey Georgeson, also known by pseudonym Mr Solo) (lead vocals, keyboards, guitar)
- Foz? (James Foster) (guitar, saw)
- The Colonel (Jem Egerton) (bass, backing vocals)
- Professor Rimschott (Graham Carlow) (drums)

=== Previous additional members ===
- ICEman (Nick Curry) (spectral roadie)
- Cocky Young'un (Gary Smith) (spectral roadie)
- Lantern (projections)
- John Pope (Jon Klein)
- The Cape

== Discography ==
=== Albums ===
- Don Spirit Specs Now! (1993) [Cassette Only]
- Work, Lovelife, Miscellaneous Kindness Recordings/Rhythm King (16 June 1997) – #70 UK Album Chart
- Shiney on the Inside Kindness Recordings (13 July 2000)
- Power Words For Better Living Kindness Recordings(12 April 2004)
- The Lost World Of David Devant Kindness Recordings(2006) [rarities compilation]
- Cut Out and Keep Me Kindness Recordings (11 December 2019)
- Seaside the B Sides Kindness Recordings (2 July 2026)[B sides compilation]

=== Singles ===
- "Cookie" / "One Hand" // "Trouble" / "Untitled" – 1995)
- "Pimlico" / "This is For Real" // "Magic Life" / "David's Coming Back" – Sept 1996
- "Miscellaneous" / "Ballroom" – 1996
- "Ginger" / "Life on a Crescent" // "Slip It To Me" (live) / "Parallel Universe Pt 2" – 10 March 1997 – #54 UK Singles Chart
- "This Is For Real" / "Ghost in My House" // "Pimlico" (live) – 9 June 1997 – #61 UK
- "This Is For Real" / "Why Can't Someone Else" / "Everything Fits Into Place"
- "Lie Detector" (remix) / "Who We Are – 13 October 1997 – #84
- "Lie Detector" (remix) / "Black and White"
- "Radar" / "Dolphin Square" // "Incurable" – 18 October 1999
- "Space Daddy" / "Born Yesterday" // "Imposters (Mixed Up)" – 3 July 2000
- "Contact" / "One Thing" // "Lifeline" – Outstanding Records OSTRS002 – 22 March 2004
- "About It" / "Any Fool Can Fall In Love" – OSTRS003 – 22 November 2004
