= Bertrand Burgalat =

French musician, composer and producer

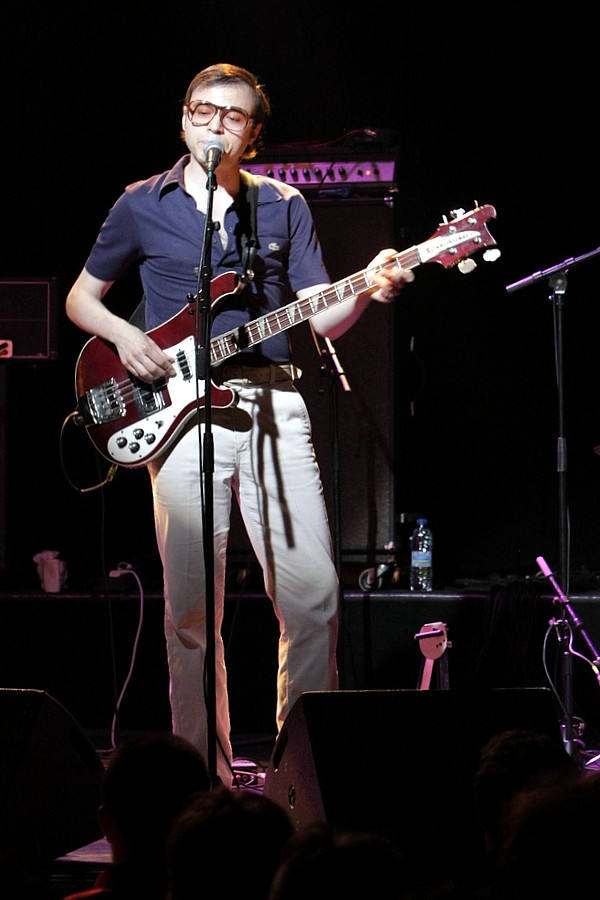
Bertrand Burgalat 2008

Bertrand Burgalat (born July 1963) is a French musician, composer and producer.

== Work ==
Burgalat is known for his 1960s-style pop sound, something he has lent to his production and arrangement work with Air, April March, A.S Dragon, Cinnamon, Dominique Dalcan, Jad Wio, Mick Harvey, Louis Philippe, Supergrass, Robert Wyatt, Alizée, and French writer Michel Houellebecq.

In 1988, at the age of 25, he co-produced Laibach's album Let It Be, which is a cover of The Beatles' album of the same name. In 1996, he arranged the strings on several tracks on Einstürzende Neubauten's album Ende Neu.

In 1995, Burgalat remixed and rearranged the Renegade Soundwave song "Positive Mindscape" (as "Positive BB") for release on the "Positive Dub Mixes" CD single. In 2001, he mixed a new version of Depeche Mode's "Easy Tiger" (an instrumental song from the album Exciter) and also did a remix of their "Freelove" hit single, from the same album.

Burgalat also composed the music for the 1995-2003 Gaumont logo.

He is currently the president of SNEP (Syndicat national de l'édition phonographique).

== Influences ==
His musical influences include the American inspired sound of French pop made famous by France Gall, Françoise Hardy and Brigitte Fontaine, as well as the singers Jacques Dutronc and Serge Gainsbourg, as well as the 'folk-music of the Ruhr' created by Kraftwerk. Burgalat also draws inspiration from 20th century French classical composers such as Maurice Ravel, Francis Poulenc and Olivier Messiaen, and was greatly influenced by the writings of cult French journalist-cum-pop visionary Yves Adrien.

== Tricatel ==
In 1995, Burgalat established his own record label, Tricatel. Tricatel had downsized its activities around 2005, concentrating on acts such as A.S. Dragon, new signing Les Shades, and Bertrand Burgalat himself. Other artists in the Tricatel catalogue included Swedish avant-pop trio Eggstone, The High Llamas, Ingrid Caven, and award-winning novelist Jonathan Coe, who teamed up with Louis Philippe and jazz pianist/double-bass player Danny Manners for the occasion. Bertrand Burgalat picked the name "Tricatel" from a successful French comedy of the 1970s, L'Aile ou la Cuisse, starring Louis de Funès and Coluche.

== Discography ==
- The Ssssound of Mmmusic (2000)
- The Genius of Bertrand Burgalat (Bungalow, 2000)
- Bertrand Burgalat Meets A.S Dragon (2001)
- Palais royal! (Original Soundtrack) (2007)
- Portrait Robot (2005)
- Inédits (2007)
- Chéri B.B. (2007)
- My Little Princess (Original Soundtrack) (2011)
- Belleville-Tokyo (Original Soundtrack) (2011)
- Toutes directions (2012)
