= Eligible Bachelors =

Studio album by The Monochrome Set
- Released: 1982
- Recorded: Quest Studios, Luton, England
- Genre: Post-punk, indie pop, jangle pop
- Length: 36:24
- Label: Cherry Red
- Producer: Tim Hart

The Monochrome Set chronology
Love Zombies (1980)	Eligible Bachelors (1982)	Volume, Contrast, Brilliance... (1983)

Eligible Bachelors is the third studio album by English band The Monochrome Set. It was released in 1982, through record label Cherry Red.

== Background ==
Eligible Bachelors was produced by former Steeleye Span member Tim Hart. It was The Monochrome Set's first album since the departure of original drummer John Haney.

The original LP had a faux white leather sleeve designed by Tom Hardy, better known as guitarist Lester Square. The back cover's liner notes featured raves about the band from various critics from around the world, including London, New York, San Francisco, Japan and Kansas.

== Track listing ==
Side A
No.	Title	Length
1.	"The Jet Set Junta"	2:06
2.	"I'll Scry Instead"	2:50
3.	"On the 13th Day"	3:06
4.	"Cloud 10"	3:30
5.	"The Mating Game"	3:20
6.	"March of the Eligible Bachelors"	3:01

Side B
No.	Title	Length
1.	"The Devil Rides Out"	3:02
2.	"Fun for All the Family"	3:45
3.	"The Midas Touch"	4:53
4.	"The Ruling Class"	2:45
5.	"The Great Barrier Riff"	3:39
Total length:		36:24

== Critical reception ==
Professional ratings
Review scores
Source	Rating
AllMusic	4.5/5 stars

AllMusic called it "one of the classic undiscovered albums of the early '80s, Eligible Bachelors is a tour de force of wit and musical imagination" and "an age-defining record". Trouser Press praised the band's "witty intelligence" and said that the album "strips the music down to essential elements".

== Personnel ==
The Monochrome Set

- Bid – lead vocals, guitar, sleeve design
- Lester Square – lead guitar, keyboards, vocals
- Lexington Crane – drums, vocals
- Andrew Warren – bass guitar, vocals

Technical

- Tim Hart – production
- Dave Cook – engineering
