= Foz Foster =

English composer and multi-instrumentalist

James 'Foz' Foster (born 1960) is an English composer and multi-instrumentalist. He is best known as the lead guitarist in the art-rock band, David Devant and his Spirit Wife, and in the 1983-5 incarnation of The Monochrome Set. Foster also plays guitar, musical saw and vibraslap in the house band of Karaoke Circus and occasional saw in Martin White's Mystery Fax Machine Orchestra. He plays ukulele and other instruments as part of the double-act, Foster and Gilvan, and is also musical director of Sawchestra – a band of musical saw players who perform Foster's compositions to accompany silent films. He also presents the radio show, 'Adrift with Foz'.

== The Monochrome Set ==
Foster grew up in Pimlico, West London. In his late teens, he formed his first band, the New Romantic Los Apachés, in which he was songwriter and played lead guitar. Los Apachés became press darlings for well over two months in the winter of 1979, and Foster was 'nicknamed the Kaftan Kid by the NME for some strange reason'. In 1983, he was talent-spotted by Andy Warren, bass player of The Monochrome Set, who was looking for a replacement for the departing guitarist, Lester Square. The band had just released the single, "Jet Set Junta", which 'nodded to the previous year's Falkland Islands conflict, becoming a big indie hit and garnering extensive play.' One of Foster's first tasks was to appear in the video for "Jet Set Junta", miming to Lester Square's guitar part. Foster went on to play on the band's fourth album, the pop-flavoured The Lost Weekend (1985), which included the singles "Wallflower" and "Jacob's Ladder". In the video for the latter, Foz dressed in a bear costume – the first of many animal costumes he would wear on stage. Although these were the most commercial-sounding records released by the Monochrome Set, sales were disappointing, and the band split up.

In 2009, when The Lost Weekend was re-released on CD by Cherry Red Records, The Guardian journalist, John Robb, wrote, "It's clearly time we resurrected the Monochrome Set, arguably the first truly postmodern pop band."

== David Devant and his Spirit Wife ==
After moving to Brighton, Foster met the artist and songwriter, Mikey Georgeson and, at the beginning of the 1990s, they formed David Devant & His Spirit Wife. All the band adopted stage names, with Georgeson as the Vessel on vocals and guitar, Professor Rimschott (Graham Carlow) on drums and the Colonel (Jem Egerton) on bass. Foster was renamed Foz?, pronounced 'Foz Questionmark'. A Devant gig was an unforgettable theatrical experience, incorporating stage magic with cardboard props, manipulated by the 'spectral roadies', Iceman and Cocky Young'un. The Vessel might be fired from a cannon, levitated or sawn in half, and the climax of every show was the appearance of the Spirit Wife, who manifested herself in the form of a Victorian lace nightie waved on a long pole. The band won a fanatically loyal following and positive, though sometimes bemused, reviews. Caroline Sullivan described a 1996 show in the Guardian: 'Led by a quiffed and moustachioed waif called the Vessel, they offer penny-dreadful glam rock augmented by a host of special effects. The music alone is worth the price of admission ... but the Devants strive to provide a more complete experience... Long may they do their strange thing.'. The theatricality of an early Devant show was captured in the video for their debut single, "Pimlico".

In 1997, the band released their first full-length album, Work Lovelife, Miscellaneous. In March, Radio-One breakfast presenter, Mark Radcliffe, chose the single, "Ginger", written by Georgeson and Foster, as his record of the week. Radcliffe said, 'Initially I was intrigued by the look of them, by the name, by the image. Then I heard some really good songs...Unless the records themselves work there is no point to all the theatricality. But this lot are messing about with the concept of what makes a pop band. Their act isn't just a gimmick. We need more bands like them.'

Although Foster left the band in the late 1990s, he rejoined for their third album, Power Words for Better Living (2004). David Devant and his Spirit Wife still perform two or three times a year, and released a new album, Cut out and Keep Me in 2019.

== Foster and Gilvan ==
Foster's next collaboration was with another fine artist, Christopher Gilvan-Cartwright, known by the stage name Baron Gilvan. As Foster and Gilvan, they wear clown make-up and perform their own songs, with Foster playing ukulele and other instruments, and Gilvan singing and playing the trombone. Foster and Gilvan often work with the puppeteer, Isobel Smith, who is Gilvan's partner. Baron Gilvan has also performed as a spectral roadie for David Devant, and is a resident judge at Karaoke Circus.

== Sawchestra ==
"Sawchestra perform Musical Surgery" at the Basement, Brighton in 2008. Foster is playing the theremin at the rear.

In 2008, Foster, Sara Passmore and Andrew Page (raxil4) created Sawchestra, a band of musicians playing saws and other instruments. Their first show, 'Sawchestra perform Musical Surgery' was staged at Brighton's live art venue, the Basement, on 4 October 2008. The space had been converted into an operating theatre and the band wore surgical gowns and masks. Foster went on to compose a soundtrack for the 1926 animated classic, The Adventures of Prince Achmed. In 2011, Sawchestra performed Prince Achmed in various theatres and festivals, and at the Folly for a Flyover, a pop-up venue beneath a flyover on the A12 in Hackney Wick. Foster's next soundtrack was for the 1920 horror film, The Golem: How He Came into the World, which Sawchestra performed at the Apollo Theatre, Piccadilly, as part of the 2011 London Sci-Fi Festival. Wired, reviewing the festival, wrote, 'Particular highlights included a screening of silent German classic Der Golem, its score played by innovative musical ensemble Sawchestra using a variety of household tools and unusual implements.' There was also 'Adrift with the Sawchestra', on 17 July 2011, when the band staged a series of floating performances on a barge on the Regent's Canal, as part of Barbican Bite's contribution to the Shoreditch Festival.

== Karaoke Circus ==
Foster is a long-standing collaborator with Martin White, playing in his Mystery Fax Machine Orchestra and in the house band for Ward and White's Karaoke Circus, where comedians sing karaoke over a live band. After singing with Karaoke Circus, the comedian Dave Gorman wrote in his blog: "I was stupidly excited to be "singing" because the lead guitarist in the band is Foz from the excellent David Devant & His Spirit Wife. I'm a fan. Now I've sung with their lead guitarist. Life is daft."

== Theatre work ==
Foster is musical director and sound designer for Touched Theatre, the puppet company, creating scores for their shows, including Blue Me and the Sea and Human Remains. For Grist to the Mill, he provided the scores for Kissing the Gunner's Daughter an installation in a bathing machine on Brighton beach in 2012. Christina the Astonishing in 2013, and Sisters of Hera, a collaboration with Aurelius productions, performed in Italy in 2014.

== Adrift ==
Foster has continued to use the name 'Adrift' for durational musical performances at festivals and in unusual spaces. In 2023, he started his own radio show, 'Adrift with Foz', on Totally Radio, featuring "found sounds, generated electronic signals, acoustic instruments, radio fragments, static and the spirit of the Shipping Forecast". In an interview with Alan Rider, he described some of the instruments he uses, which include "the Leaf Audio Microphonic Sound Box, Assam Bells Horror Cinematic noise generator, Cometogetherasone Noise box, Waterphone, and home-made spring with plunger."
