= Thatababy =

Comic strip created by Paul Trap

- Current status/schedule: Current daily strip
- Launch date: October 4, 2010; 15 years ago
- Syndicate(s): Universal Uclick/Andrews McMeel Syndication
- Genre: Humor

Thatababy is a daily humor comic strip created by Paul Trap, launched on October 4, 2010, and syndicated by Andrews McMeel Syndication. The central characters are the titular baby and an unnamed Mom and Dad. Trap describes Thatababy as "a parenting strip through the eyes of the baby." Before syndication Trap entered the strip in the Amazon Comic Strip Superstar contest, where it drew praise from judges Lynn Johnston, Garry Trudeau, Mark Tatulli and Scott Hilburn. Andrews-McMeel has published three e-book collections: Thatababy Rocks Out!, Thatababy Geeks Out! and Thatababy Gets Arty! On December 31, 2025, Paul Trap retired and posted his last Thatababy strip. On January 1, 2026, Jonathan Lemon took over the Thatababy strip.
