= Strange Boutique (album) =

Studio album by The Monochrome Set
- Released: April 1980
- Studio: Sound Suite, Camden, England
- Genre: Post-punk
- Length: 35:24
- Label: Dindisc
- Producer: Bob Sargeant

The Monochrome Set chronology
Strange Boutique (1980)	Love Zombies (1980)

Strange Boutique is the debut studio album by English band The Monochrome Set. It was released in 1980, through record label Dindisc.

== Track listing ==
All tracks are written by Bid except where noted.

Side one
No.	Title	Writer(s)	Length
1.	"The Monochrome Set (I Presume)"		5:12
2.	"The Lighter Side of Dating"	Bid, Lester Square	2:42
3.	"Espresso"		3:11
4.	"The Puerto Rican Fence Climber"	Square	2:59
5.	"Tomorrow Will Be Too Long"	Bid, J.D. Haney	2:59
6.	"Martians Go Home"	Bid, Square	2:01

Side two
No.	Title	Writer(s)	Length
1.	"Love Goes Down the Drain"		2:27
2.	"Ici Les Enfants"	Haney, Bid	3:06
3.	"The Etcetera Stroll"	Square	4:42
4.	"Goodbye Joe"		2:42
5.	"The Strange Boutique"	Bid, Square	3:09
Total length:			35:24

== Release ==
The album reached number 62 on the UK Albums Chart.

== Critical reception ==
Professional ratings
Review scores
Source	Rating
AllMusic	3.5/5 stars
Smash Hits	6/10

Writing for Smash Hits in 1980, Red Starr, in a mixed review, described Strange Boutique as "virtually impossible to pigeonhole. Starr described the lyrics as an "odd mixture of amusing fantasy and sudden seriousness". Starr finished by saying the album was "light, modern and attractive, but difficult to take too seriously".

AllMusic gave the album a mildly favourable review, writing "amid the austerity of post-punk England, and before we became awash with irony and archness, we needed a band who could raise their eyebrows and smirk at it all without ever being condescending (or maybe only a little bit condescending)."

== Personnel ==
The Monochrome Set

- Bid – lead vocals, guitar
- Lester Square – lead guitar, vocals
- Andy Warren – bass guitar, vocals
- J.D. Haney – drums, percussion, vocals

Technical

- Bob Sargeant – keyboards, vocals, production
- Alvin "2 Shades" Clark – engineering
- Peter Saville, The Monochrome Set – cover design
