= Andy Warren (British musician) =

English bassist

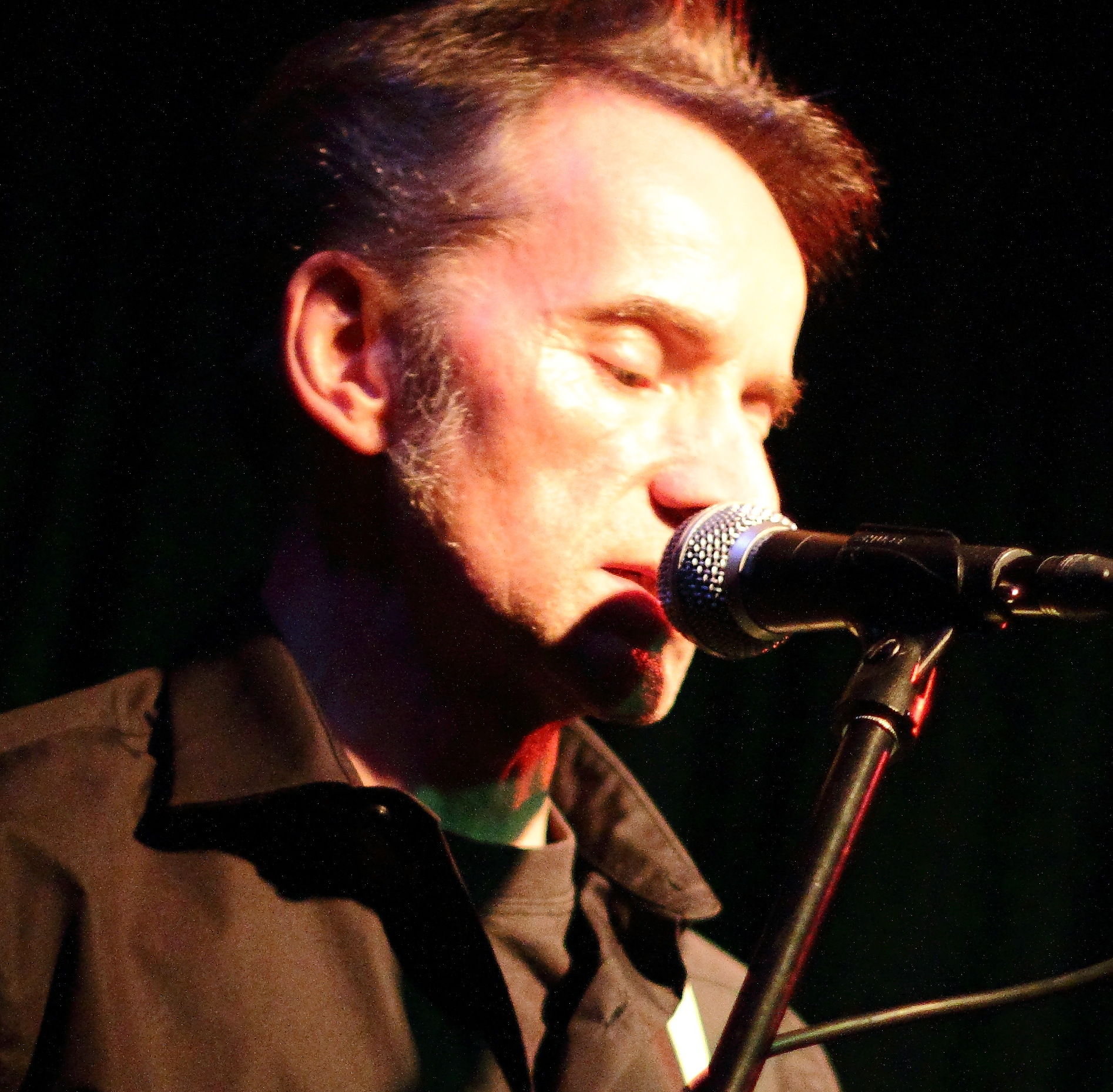
Andy Warren, 2016

Andrew Warren (born 1958) is an English bassist. He was originally in the punk rock-post punk band Adam and the Ants, but left in 1979 to join former bandmates Bid and Lester Square in The Monochrome Set.

Since 2004, he has been a member of British indie-pop band Would-Be-Goods. In 2010 he co-reformed The Monochrome Set with Bid and Lester Square.
