= Spaces Everywhere =

Studio album by The Monochrome Set
- Released: 16 March 2015
- Recorded: Brixton, London
- Genre: Post-punk; Indie pop; jangle pop
- Length: 34:03
- Label: Tapete
- Producer: Bid and Jon Clayton

The Monochrome Set chronology
| Super Plastic City (2013) | Spaces Everywhere (2015) |

Spaces Everywhere is the twelfth studio album by English band The Monochrome Set. It was released on 16 March 2015 through German record label Tapete.

== Background ==
The album is the band's third studio album since re-forming in 2011 and their first release on Tapete Records.

== Track listing ==
| No. | Title | Length |
|---|---|---|
| 1. | "Iceman" | 3:13 |
| 2. | "Fantasy Creatures" | 3:41 |
| 3. | "Avenue" | 3:44 |
| 4. | "Oh, You're Such A Star" | 2:45 |
| 5. | "Rain Check" | 3:53 |
| 6. | "When I Get To Hollywood" | 2:41 |
| 7. | "The Z Train" | 3:59 |
| 8. | "The Scream" | 3:37 |
| 9. | "In A Little Village" | 3:03 |
| 10. | "Spaces Everywhere" | 3:27 |
| Total length: | | 34:03 |

== Critical reception ==
Professional ratings
Aggregate scores
| Source | Rating |
|---|---|
| Metacritic | 78/100 |
Review scores
| Source | Rating |
| Allmusic | 4.0/5 stars |
| Drowned in Sound | 5/10 stars |
| NME | 8/10 stars |
| PopMatters | 7/10 stars |

On Metacritic, which assigns a "weighted average" rating out of 100 from selected independent ratings and reviews from mainstream critics, the album received a score of 78 based on 11 reviews. AllMusic said "The bulk of the album sounds like Television married Sparks and had a baby during London's swinging '60s and commented on the album's title track that as album closers go, it's a flute-filled, existential whopper and There really are spaces everywhere, and most would be better served if they were filled with Monochrome Set albums.

== Personnel ==
The Monochrome Set

- Bid – lead vocals, guitar, sleeve design
- John Paul Moran – keyboards
- Steve Brummell – drums, vocals
- Andrew Warren – bass guitar
- Lester Square – lead guitar

Technical

- Jon Clayton – production, engineering
- Timo Blunk – mixing
