= Él Records =

English independent record label

él
- Founded: 1984
- Founder: Mike Alway
- Genre: Post-punk; chamber pop; sunshine pop; esoterica; soundtrack; Latin; jazz
- Country of origin: United Kingdom
- Location: London
- Official website: www.cherryred.co.uk/product-category/el/

él is an English independent record label based in London that was founded by Mike Alway, later becoming a subsidiary of Cherry Red Records. Their musicians were characterized by a strong English sensibility, as well as the French influence stemming from in-house writer/producer Louis Philippe. During their original run, él received much interest from the press, but not a huge number of sales, except in Japan, where the label became an enormous influence on J-pop acts like Cornelius and Pizzicato Five. The label closed in 1989. In 2005, it was revived as a reissue label.

== Overview ==
Alway, who cut his teeth in the late seventies working with The Soft Boys and promoting clubs and concerts in Richmond, London, joined Cherry Red Records in 1980 to work alongside the company's founder, Iain McNay.

Over the next few years, he signed many of the artists who would become most closely associated with the label — The Monochrome Set, Felt, Everything But The Girl, Marine Girls, Fantastic Something, Eyeless in Gaza etc. This was widely recognised as a golden period for the label, culminating in the release of "Pillows & Prayers", the budget priced compilation that encapsulated the label's emerging style. It dominated the then prestigious UK independent charts in 1983.

Alway then misguidedly (by his own subsequent admission) formed the Warner Bros. Records-backed Blanco Y Negro with Geoff Travis of Rough Trade, taking several Cherry Red artists with him, notably Monochrome Set and Everything But The Girl. The relationship with Warner Bros. did not gel, however, leading to a return to the Cherry Red family and the high concept él Records, which he had founded as a subsidiary outlet while at Blanco, became his new focus. él combined the technicolor exoticism of Powell and Pressburger with the escapist fantasy of The Avengers. The stylised visual aesthetic of The Prisoner with the dry-witted late seventies British television comedies The Good Life and The Fall and Rise of Reginald Perrin. Richard Briers and Leonard Rossiter were, to Mike Alway, what Malcolm McLaren was to Alan McGee.

él's playful humour and highly visual aesthetic spoke to the Japanese and was a significant influence on the Shibuya-kei phenomenon that involved Cornelius, Pizzicato Five and Kahimi Karie. Indeed, él and Alway were immortalised in Kahimi Karie's domestic top ten hit, "Mike Alway's Diary", that was written by the high priest of "J-Pop", Keigo Oyamada.

Although Alway had recruited a cast of performers he would describe as the best English pop writers of their generation — Vic Godard, Bid (The Monochrome Set), Karl Blake (Shock Headed Peters), Jessica Griffin (Would-be-goods), Victor Armada (Mayfair Charm School), Nick Currie (Momus), Philippe Auclair (Louis Philippe), and former Jonathan King teen prodigy Simon Turner (The King of Luxembourg), critical acclaim was not matched by sales and in 1988 the project was abandoned.

In 2005, él reinvented itself (again under the Cherry Red flag) with Alway applying his eclectic taste to the restoration of historic editions; film soundtracks, jazz, and flamenco guitar, Brazilian and Indian recordings, vocal and Modern Classical music

Nicholas aka Nick Wesolowski, drummer with The Monochrome Set (formed by members of the original Adam and the Ants) led design and layout for the label, and worked as photographer for él Records.

== Selected list of él artists ==
=== Original label ===
- Mayfair Charm School (Featuring Victor Armada)
- Shock Headed Peters
- The Monochrome Set (Bid)
- Vic Godard
- Felt
- Momus
- Would-be-goods
- James Dean Driving Experience
- Marden Hill
- The King Of Luxembourg
- Bad Dream Fancy Dress
- Louis Philippe
- The Cavaliers
- Cagliostra
- Anthony Adverse
- Klaxon 5

=== Historical label ===
- Andrés Segovia
- Antonio Carlos Jobim
- Baden Powell/Vinicius de Moraes
- Brigitte Bardot
- David Axelrod
- Edda Dell'Orso
- Edgard Varèse
- Elis Regina
- Ennio Morricone
- Erik Satie
- Four Freshmen
- Gábor Szabó
- Gary McFarland
- Gilberto Gil
- Henry Mancini
- Jacques Brel
- Juan Garcia Esquivel
- Nino Rota
- Orson Welles
- Quarteto em Cy
- Ravi Shankar
- Roy Budd
- Sabicas
- Ustad Ali Akbar Khan

== See also ==
- List of record labels
- List of independent UK record labels
