= Lester Square =

Musician

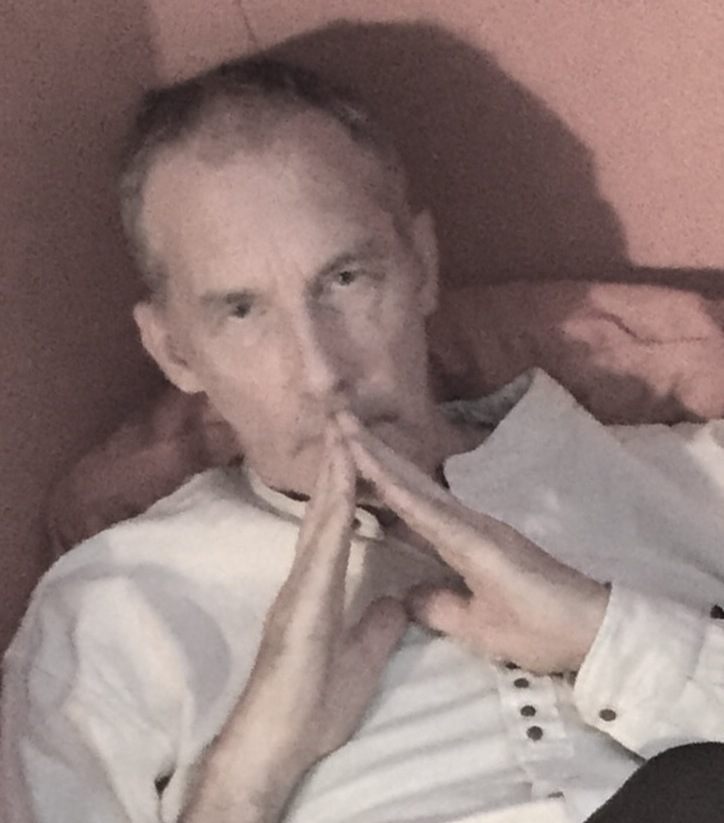
Lester Square 2020

Lester Square (born Thomas Hardy, 17 April 1954, Canada) is an English musician, composer, artist and writer. He is the former lead guitarist for The Monochrome Set. He joined the first incarnation of Adam and the Ants as lead guitarist , (and its earlier incarnation known as The B-Sides) after meeting Adam while studying at Hornsey College of Art, writing Ants staples "Fall In" and "Fat Fun" during this period. He left in 1978 to form The Monochrome Set with singer-songwriter Bid, a band cited as "a major influence on the Smiths, Franz Ferdinand, Orange Juice, Fire Engines and a whole host of UK indie and post punk bands." He has also briefly played guitar with The Invisible (1985–1987), ...And the Native Hipsters, and Jesus Couldn't Drum.

Square has also composed music for dance performance, most notably Rhythm and Hues, a kinaesthetic exploration of 20th-century works of art in collaboration with the Tate Gallery and Helen McCookerybook. Also in collaboration with McCookerybook, he composed soundtrack music for the Channel 4 documentaries Pictures of Women and No-one Likes Us, We Don't Care, as well as Akiko Hada and Wolfgang Müller's 1991 parable on the fall of the Berlin Wall, The Fall of a Queen, or the Taste of the Fruit to Come.

He has released five solo albums since leaving The Monochrome Set: Carcass in 2017, Serotonin in 2018, Chautauqua in 2019, Nuevo Laredo in 2021, Invisible Man in 2022, Taps in 2023, Gaijin in 2024, Eras in 2025, Sin in 2026.

As a visual artist, Square has regularly exhibited his work and between 1996 and 2004 he sat on the editorial board of The International Journal of Art and Design Education, acting as Literary Editor for 5 years. In 2006 he edited “Art Education in a Postmodern World” (Intellect Books).

During that period, he was also a regular contributor to the Times Educational Supplement and has acted as creative arts consultant to the QCDA and The Prince's Teaching Institute.

Between 2019 and 2025 he was a member of Extinction Rebellion’s Media and Messaging team and sat on the steering group of Music Declares Emergency, an environmental pressure group founded by musicians and members of the wider music industry, contributing to their monthly show on Soho Radio. He was a founding member of Media Revolution, a pressure organisation addressing disinformation in the broadcast and print media.

== Discography ==
Studio albums with The Monochrome Set

- Strange Boutique (1980, Dindisc)
- Love Zombies (1980, Dindisc)
- Eligible Bachelors (1982, Cherry Red)
- Dante's Casino (1990, Vinyl Japan)
- Jack (1991, Honeymoon)
- Charade (1993, Cherry Red)
- Misère (1994, Cherry Red)
- Trinity Road (1995, Cherry Red)
- Platinum Coils (2012, Disquo Bleu)
- Super Plastic City (2013, Disquo Bleu)
- Spaces Everywhere (2015, Tapete)

With The Invisible

- Dystopia (1985, Midnight Music)

Extended plays with The Monochrome Set

- I Love Lambeth (1995, Cherry Red)

With The Invisible

- Love Street/Sunday/Twilight Zone (1986, Midnight Music)

Solo

- The Plug/Gulp (1982, Thin Sliced)

Selected compilation albums

- Volume, Contrast, Brilliance... (Sessions & Singles Vol. 1) (1983, Cherry Red)
- Westminster Affair (Bande Originale Du Film) (1988, Él)
- Colour Transmission (1988, Virgin)
- What a Whopper! (1992, Richmond)
- Early Recordings: 1975–1977 "White Noise" (2010, Captured Tracks)

Box sets

- The Monochrome Set - 1979-1985: Complete Recordings (Boxset) (2018, Tapete)
- Little Noises (2020, Cherry Red)

Live albums

- Fin (1986, Cherry Red)
- Live (1993, Code 90)
- M-80 (2013, Weinerworld)

Video albums

- The Monochrome Set (2002, Classic Rock Productions)
- Destiny Always Calls Twice (2006, Cherry Red Films)
- M-80 (2013, Weinerworld)
- Access All Areas (2015, Edsel)

Singles with The Monochrome Set

- "He's Frank"/"Alphaville" (1979, Rough Trade)
- "He's Frank (Slight Return)"/"Silicon Carne"/"Fallout" (1979, Rough Trade, Disquo Bleu)
- "The Monochrome Set"/"Mr. Bizarro" (1979, Rough Trade)
- "Eine Symphonie des Grauens"/"Lester Leaps In" (1979, Rough Trade)
- "405 Lines"/"Goodbye Joe" (1980, Dindisc)
- "The Strange Boutique"/"Surfing S.W.12" (1980, Dindisc)
- "Apocalypso"/"Fiasco Bongo" (1980, Dindisc)
- "Ten Don'ts for Honeymooners"/"Straits of Malacca" (1981, PRE)
- "The Mating Game"/"J.D.H.A.N.E.Y" (1982, Cherry Red)
- "The Jet Set Junta"/"Love Goes Down the Drain"/"Noise (Eine Kleine Symphonie)" (1982, Cherry Red)
- "Killing Dave"/"House of God" (live) (1991, Honeymoon)
- "Forever Young"/"Hurting You"/"Little Noises" (1993, Cherry Red)
- "Waiting for Alberto"/"I Can’t Control My Feet" (Lazy Perfection, 2012)

Solo albums

- Carcass (2017, Cubist)
- Serotonin (2018, Cubist)
- Chautauqua (2019, Cubist)
- Nuevo Laredo (2020, Cubist)
- Invisible Man (2022, Cubist)
- Taps (2023)
- Gaijin (2024)
- Eras (2025)
- Sin (2026)

Extended play

- Cuts (with Craig Gannon) (2020, Cubist)

Singles

- "Ricochet" (with Victory Through Sound) (2017, Cubist)
- "I Come and Stand at Every Door" (with Tilly Robinson) (2020, Cubist)

As a guest

- ...And the Native Hipsters: "Going Steady with Larry and Emma" (1983, Plattecop Volume)
- Jesus Couldn’t Drum: Er…Something about Cows (1985, Lost Moment)
- Jesus Couldn’t Drum: Good Morning Mr Square (1986, Lost Moment)
- The Cat and Mouse Band: From the Caves of the Whistling Blue Fish Monks (1987, Lost Moment)
- Would-Be-Goods: Mondo (1992, Polystar)
- Helen McCookerybook: Helen and the Horns Etc. (2005, New Shore)
- Helen McCookerybook: Suburban Pastoral (2006, Big Song)
- Helen McCookerybook: Christmas Assortment (2007, Bendi)
- ...And the Native Hipsters: There Goes Concorde Again (2001, MRM)
- Peat Moss: Moustache Vending Machine (2016, Red Velvet)
- Wilding and Unwilding: Hard Noise to Scumrise (2020)
- Various Artists, Miniatures (2020, The 62nd Gramophone Company)
- Various Artists, Household Objects (2025, The 62nd Gramophone Company)
