= The Monochrome Set =

English post-punk/new wave band

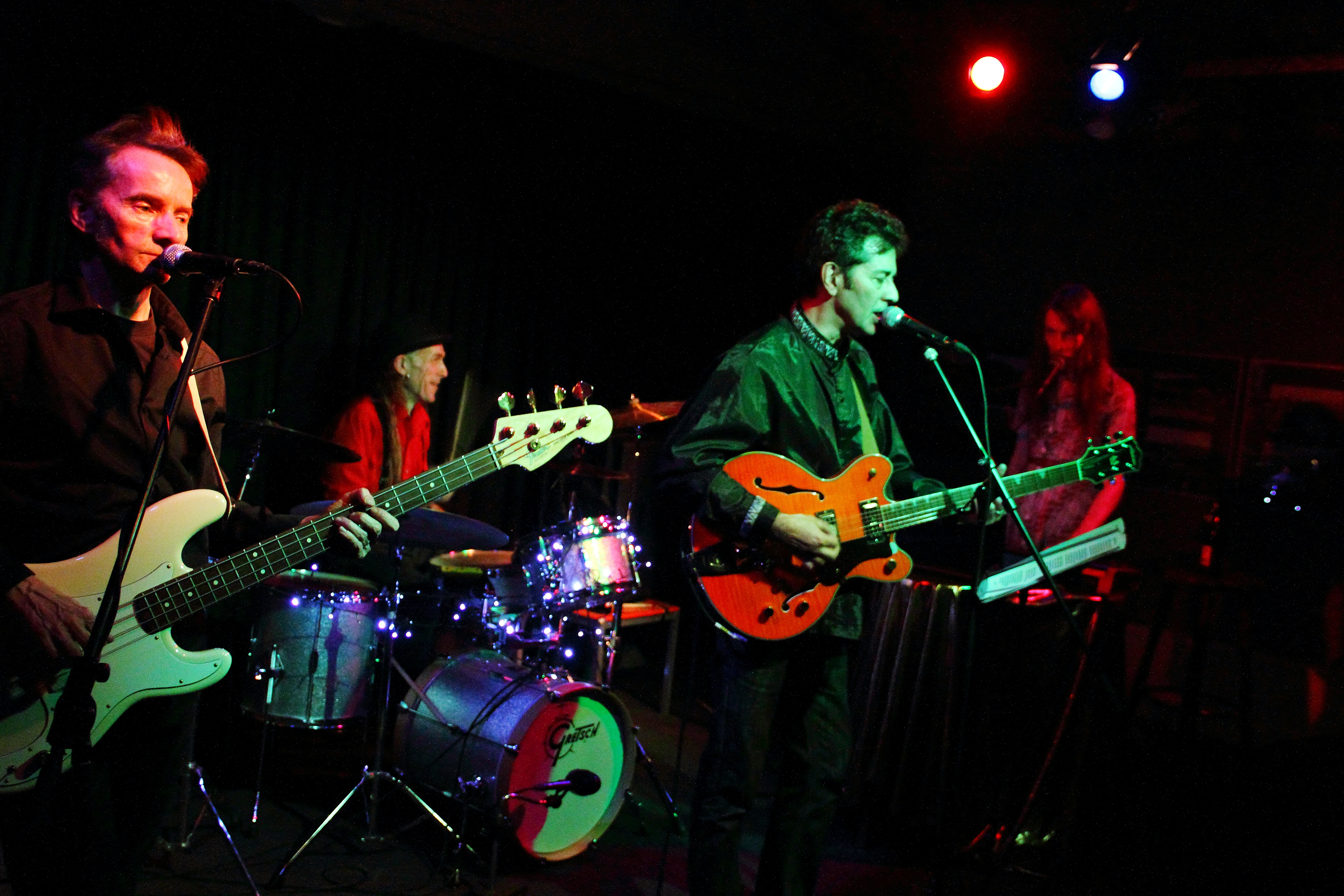
- The Monochrome Set at Club W71, Germany 2016

Background information
- Origin: London, England
- Genres: Post-punk; new wave
- Years active: 1978–1985; 1990–1998; 2008–present
- Labels: Rough Trade; DinDisc; Cherry Red; Blanco y Negro; Warner Bros.; Tapete
- Members: Bid; Andy Warren; James 'Foz' Foster; Athen Ayren; Dave Morgan
- Past members: Lester Square; Charlie X; Simon Croft; J.D. Haney; Jeremy Harrington; Philip Morris; Lexington Crane; Orson Presence; Carrie Booth (aka Caralinda Booth); Nicholas Weslowski; Tony Potts; Sian Chaffer; Jennifer Denitto; Steve Brummell; John Paul Moran; Mike Urban; Helena Johansson; Stephen Gilchrist
- Website: themonochromeset.co.uk

The Monochrome Set are an English post-punk/new wave band, originally formed in London in January 1978 by Ganesh "Bid" Seshadri, Lester Square, John Haney and Jeremy Harrington. As of January 2026, the most recent line-up consists of Bid, Andy Warren, James 'Foz' Foster, Athen Ayren and Dave Morgan.

== History ==
=== Original band: 1978–1985 ===
The Monochrome Set was formed in London in 1978 from the remnants of a college group called The B-Sides, whose members had included Stuart Goddard, later known as Adam Ant. Their first live gig was on 15 Feb 1978, at Westfield College in London. The original line-up consisted of Indian-born lead singer and principal songwriter Bid (real name Ganesh Seshadri), Canadian guitarist Lester Square (real name Thomas W.B. Hardy), drummer John D. Haney (formerly of The Art Attacks) and bass guitarist Charlie X. The band had two more bassists, Jeremy Harrington and Simon Croft, before Andy Warren of the Ants, a childhood friend of Bid, joined in late 1979.

Experimental filmmaker Tony Potts began collaborating with the band in 1979, designing lighting and stage sets with film projections for their live appearances. The band's early persona was defined by the shadowy, uncertain stage images created by the films to such an extent he is often described as being the band's "fifth member".

They released several singles for the Rough Trade label before recording their debut studio album, Strange Boutique, produced by Bob Sargeant for Virgin Records' imprint DinDisc in 1980. It peaked at No. 62 in the UK Albums Chart in 1980. Their follow-up effort, Love Zombies, was produced by Alvin Clark and the band later that same year. Haney left the band in 1981, and was replaced by Lexington Crane.

In 1982, the band switched labels to Cherry Red to release their third album, Eligible Bachelors, produced by Tim Hart. Square and Crane left soon afterwards, and were replaced by keyboardist Carrie Booth and drummer Nicholas Weslowski. This line-up recorded a 1982 single, "Cast a Long Shadow", for Cherry Red, before Booth was in turn replaced by new lead guitarist James 'Foz' Foster (later of David Devant & His Spirit Wife).

In 1983, Cherry Red released Volume, Contrast, Brilliance..., a retrospective of the band's early Rough Trade singles, BBC and Capital Radio sessions, and other unreleased early sessions.

In 1985, with the same line-up as on Cast a Long Shadow, The Monochrome Set recorded The Lost Weekend for Warner Bros. Records. The Lost Weekend failed commercially, and after a few singles, the band officially broke up, though they served as Jessica Griffin's backing band on the first album by the Would-Be-Goods, The Camera Loves Me in 1988.

Nicholas aka Nick Wesolowski, drummer with the band in the 1980s, was also a photographer for él Records, a subsidiary of Cherry Red Records.He later worked in Risk Management.

=== Reformed: 1990–1998 ===
In early 1990, Bid, Square and Warren reformed the band, with the addition of keyboardist Orson Presence and drummer Mike Urban (then known as Mike Slocombe), who was replaced by Trevor Ready. The new band toured extensively, especially in Japan where they had become very popular. The band released five albums for Vinyl Japan/Cherry Red during the 1990s, before going on hiatus in 1998.

Bid recorded a number of albums with his band, Scarlet's Well. The song, "He's Frank", appeared on the TV series Heroes. The recording used was a cover version of the original, recorded by the Brighton Port Authority (AKA Fatboy Slim) featuring Iggy Pop.

=== 2008 reunion ===
The band reunited on 8 October 2008 for a one-off performance at Cherry Red's 30th anniversary party at Dingwalls, London. It also marked the 30th anniversary of The Monochrome Set. Bid, Warren and Square were joined by Jennifer Denitto (drums) and Sian Chaffer (keyboards) of Scarlet's Well, and performed 13 songs.

=== 2010 to present day ===
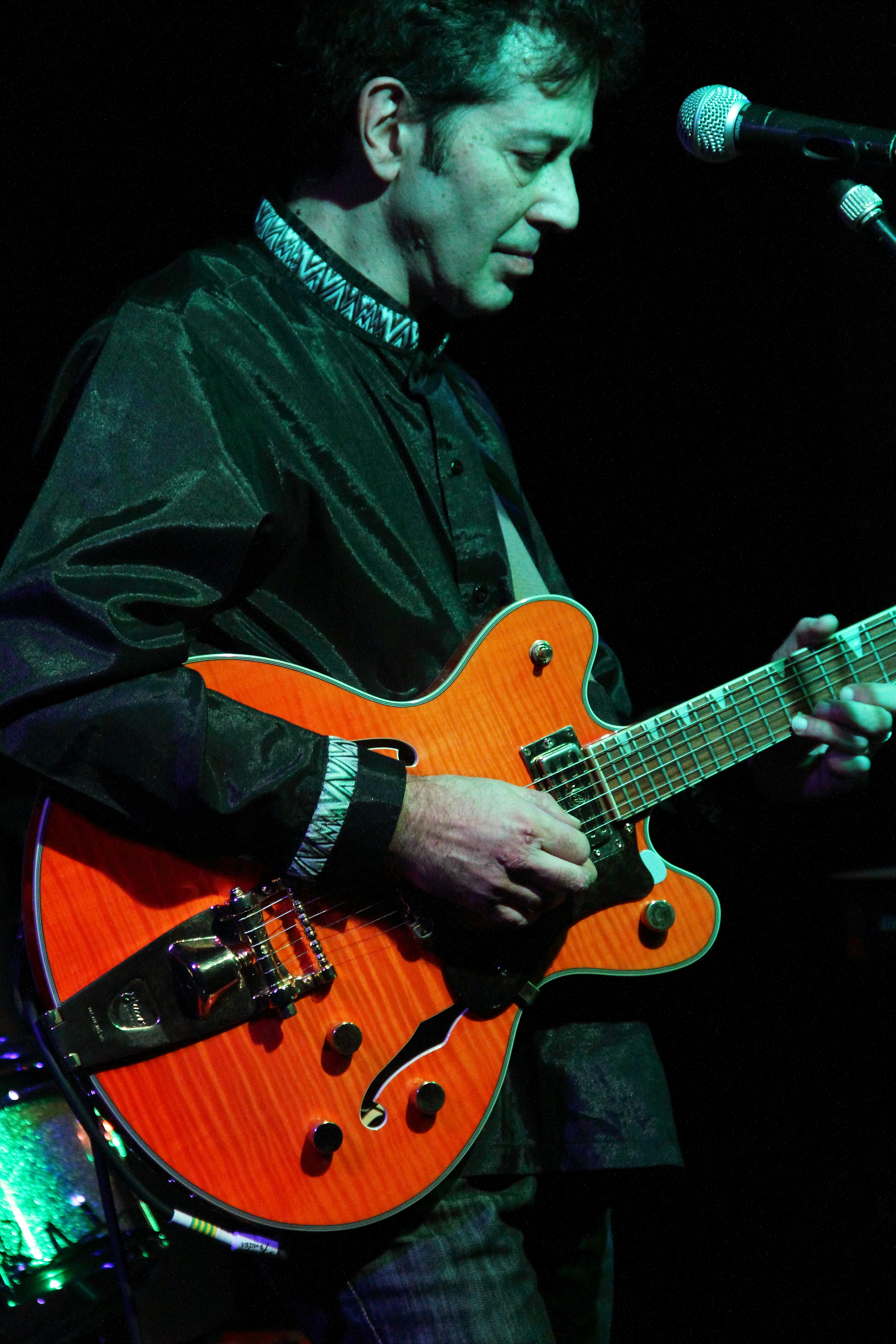
Bandleader, singer and guitar player Bid

In 2010, Bid, Square and Warren reformed the band, with the addition of drummer Jennifer Denitto from Scarlet's Well and keyboard player John Paul Moran. Following Bid's recovery from an aneurysm in late 2010, they played dates the following year in the United Kingdom, France, Germany, Spain, Greece, Japan and The Netherlands. The band continued to tour in the UK, Europe and Japan throughout 2012, playing material from their 10th studio album Platinum Coils (their first album since 1995's Trinity Road) as well as selections from their extensive back catalogue. In 2011 the band were joined by Helena Johansson from Scarlet's Well on violin and mandolin, replacing John Paul Moran, and Steve Brummell (formerly of the band Luxembourg) replaced Jennifer Denitto on drums. The band completed a short tour of the east coast of the US in spring of 2013 and released their 11th studio album, Super Plastic City in the autumn of the same year. Helena Johansson left the band in the summer of 2013.

In 2014, they signed to the German record label Tapete and their 12th studio album, Spaces Everywhere was released in 2015. Guitarist Lester Square left the band in late 2014, after completing recording of the album, and former member John Paul Moran rejoined. Their thirteenth studio album, Cosmonaut, was released on the Tapete label in September 2016. Mike Urban, who had previously been in the band in 1990 and played on the Dante's Casino album, joined the band in September 2016, replacing Steve Brummell on drums. In 2018, the fortieth year since the band formed, their 14th studio album, Maisieworld and a box set, The Monochrome Set 1979–1985: Complete Recordings, were released. In 2019 they toured the United States again, playing for the first time on the west coast as well as the east and released their 15th studio album, Fabula Mendax in September that year. In mid 2021, John Paul Moran left the band, to be replaced by Athen Ayren, and the announcement of a new album, their 16th, to be released in Spring 2022. The new album, Allhallowtide, was released on 11 March 2022. Mike Urban left the band in September 2022 to be replaced by Stephen Gilchrist. In July 2023, Tapete Records released a compilation album,The Monochrome Set, Radio Sessions Marc Riley BBC6 Music, 2011-2022 The band announced Gilchrist's departure in January 2026, with Dave Morgan joining as their drummer and Foz returning full time on lead guitar.

== Influence ==
Morrissey and Johnny Marr of The Smiths were influenced by the band, initially bonding partly due to Morrissey owning one of the band's singles. Additionally, the band influenced Alex Kapranos of Franz Ferdinand, who has covered their song Goodbye Joe on the band's TikTok.

== Band members ==
Timeline

== Discography ==
- Strange Boutique (1980)
- Love Zombies (1980)
- Eligible Bachelors (1982)
- The Lost Weekend (1985)
- Dante's Casino (1990)
- Jack (1991)
- Charade (1993)
- Misère (1994)
- Trinity Road (1995)
- Platinum Coils (2012)
- Super Plastic City (2013)
- Spaces Everywhere (2015)
- Cosmonaut (2016)
- Maisieworld (2018)
- Fabula Mendax (2019)
- Allhallowtide (2022)
- Lotus Bridge (2026)
