= List of films shot in Toronto =

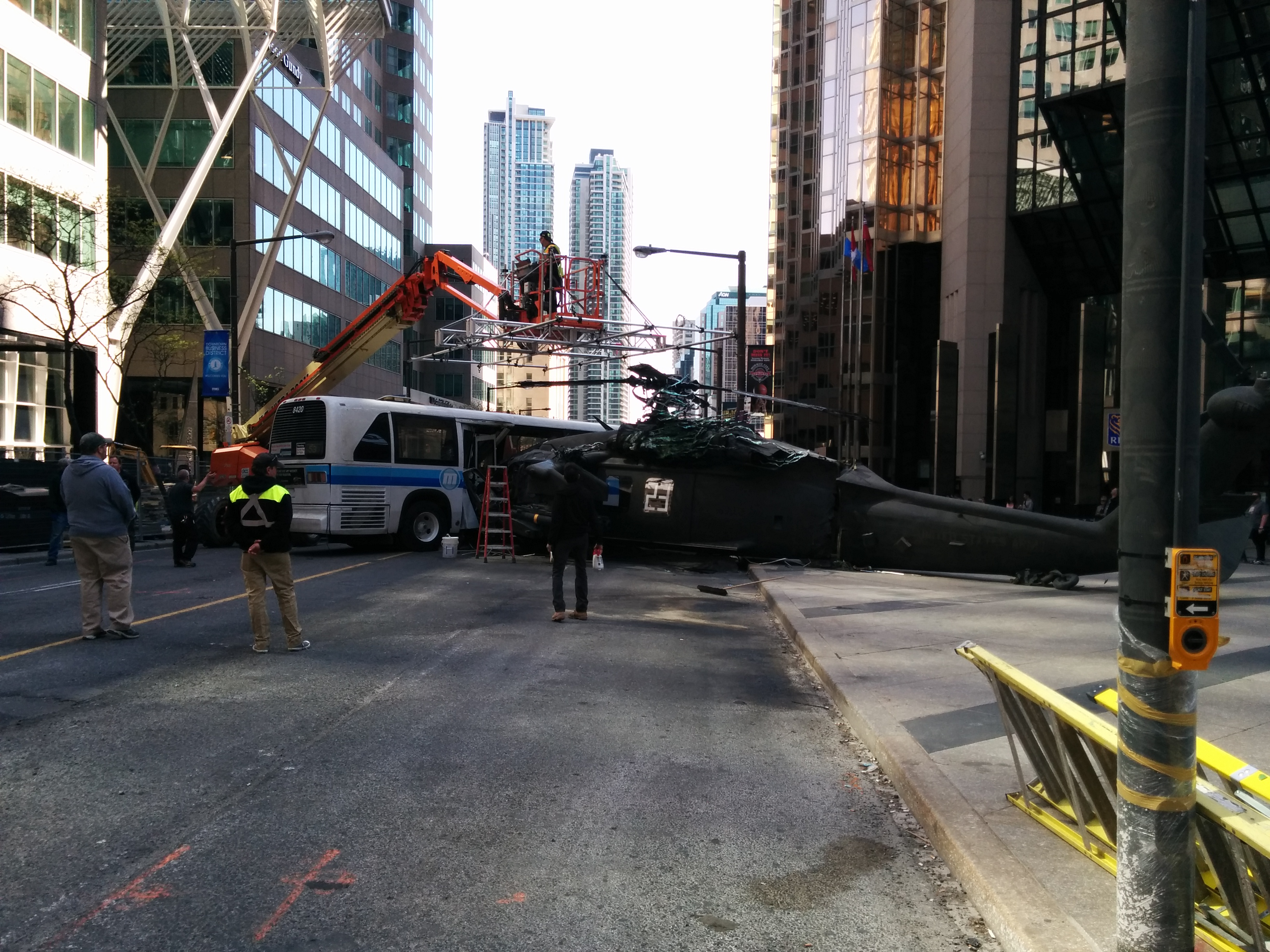
A film crew prepares a scene for the film Suicide Squad, on Bay Street, Toronto

Film production is an industry in the Greater Toronto Area, with the City of Toronto being colloquially referred to as Hollywood North. (Note: The term Hollywood North has been used to refer to Toronto, and Vancouver) The city is home to a number of film production companies, as well as Canada's largest film studio, Pinewood Toronto Studios.

A number of films shot in the city use Toronto as a setting in film. However, the majority of non-Canadian films that were shot in Toronto, do not explicitly use the city as the setting for the film being shot. Many American produced films use the city as a stand in for New York City or Chicago.

== Movies ==
Title	Year	Notes
=== 0-9 ===
.45	2005, 2006	
=== A ===
Adventures in Babysitting	1987	
The Adventures of Pluto Nash	2002	
Against the Ropes	2004	
Angel Eyes	2001	
American Pie Presents: Beta House	2007	
American Pie Presents: The Naked Mile	2006	
American Psycho	2000	
American Psycho 2	2002	
Ararat	2002	
Assault on Precinct 13	2005	
Aurora Borealis	2006	
Away from Her	2006	
=== B ===
Bait	2000	
The Best Man Holiday	2013	
The Big Hit	1998	
Billy Madison	1995	
Bitten	2014–16	TV series
Black Christmas	1974	
Blade II	2002	
Bless the Child	2000	
Blizzard	2003	
Blues Brothers 2000	1998	
Bollywood/Hollywood	2002	
The Boondock Saints	1999	
Booty Call	1997	
Bowling for Columbine	2002	
Breach	2007	
Breaking Point	1976	
Bride of Chucky	1998	
Brokeback Mountain	2005	
Bulletproof Monk	2003	
=== C ===
Cake	2005	
Canadian Bacon	1995	
Camp Rock	2008	
Camp Rock 2: The Final Jam	2010	
Capote	2004	
Car 54, Where Are You?	1994	
Cat	2011	
The Caveman's Valentine	2001	
The Chair	2007	
A Change of Mind	1967	
Charlie Bartlett	2007	
Cheaper by the Dozen 2	2005	
Chicago	2002	
Chloe	2009	
A Christmas Story	1983	
Cinderella Man	2005	
Circle of Two	1980	
Class of 1984	1982	
Clubland	2007	
Cock	1987	
Cocktail	1988	
Cold Creek Manor	2003	
Confessions of a Teenage Drama Queen	2004	
A Cool, Dry Place	1999	
The Corruptor	1999	
Crash	1996	
Cruel Intentions	1999	
Cube	1997	
Cube 2: Hypercube	2002	
=== D ===
Dark Water	2005	
Dawn of the Dead	2004	
Dead Ringers	1988	
Death to Smoochy	2002	
Death Weekend	1976	
Death Wish V: The Face of Death	1994	
Detroit Rock City	1999	
Devil	2010	
Dick	1999	
The Dirties	2013	
Don't Say a Word	2001	
Double Impact	1991	
Down in the Delta	1998	
Down to Earth	2001	
Dracula 2000	2000	
Dream Scenario	2023	
Driven	2001	
Due South	1994-1999	TV series
=== E ===
Enemy	2013	
Every Day	2018	
Existenz	1999	
Exit Wounds	2001	
Exotica	1994	
=== F ===
The F Word	2013	
Fantastic Four	2005	
Fahrenheit 451	2018	
Fever Pitch	2005	
Finding Forrester	2000	
Firehouse Dog	2007	
Flaming Frontier	1958	
Flash of Genius	2008	
Flashpoint	2008-2012	TV series
The Fly	1986	
Fly Away Home	1996	
Foolproof	2003	
Fools Rush In	1997	
Forever Knight	1992-1996	TV series
Four Brothers	2005	
Freddy vs. Jason	2003	
Frenemies	2012	
Frequency	2000	
Friday the 13th: The Series	1987-1990	TV series
Full Frontal	2002	
=== G ===
Get Rich or Die Tryin'	2005	
Ginger Snaps	2000	
Glitter	2001	
Godsend	2004	
Good Will Hunting	1997	
The Gospel of John	2003	
Gossip	2000	
Gotti	1996	
Graveyard Shift	1987	
=== H ===
Hairspray	2007	
Half Baked	1998	
Harold & Kumar Go to White Castle	2004	
Hedwig and the Angry Inch	2001	
The Heist	2001	
Hello Mary Lou: Prom Night II	1987	
A History of Violence	2005	
Hollywoodland	2006	
A Home at the End of the World	2004	
Honey	2003	
How to Deal	2003	
How to Lose a Guy in 10 Days	2003	
The Hurricane	1999	
=== I ===
Ice Princess	2005	
The In-Laws	2003	
In the Shadow of the Moon	2019	
In Too Deep	1998	
The Incredible Hulk	2008	
The Interpreter	2005	
It	2017	
It Takes Two	1995	
I've Heard the Mermaids Singing	1987	
=== J ===
Jane Doe	2005-2008	TV film series
Jason X	2001	
Jekyll + Hyde	2006	
Jerry and Tom	1998	
John Q.	2002	
Johnny Mnemonic	1995	
Jumper	2008	
=== K ===
K-19: The Widowmaker	2002	
Kal Ho Naa Ho	2003	
Keeping the Faith	2000	
Kick-Ass	2010	
Kick-Ass 2	2013	
The Kidnapping of the President	1980	
Kids in the Hall: Brain Candy	1996	
Kismat Konnection	2008	
Kit Kittredge: An American Girl	2008	
Knockaround Guys	2002	
Kung Fu: The Legend Continues	1993-1997	TV series
=== L ===
La Femme Nikita	1997-2001	TV series
The Ladies Man	2000	
Land of the Dead	2005	
Let's All Hate Toronto	2007	
Lie with Me	2005	
The Long Kiss Goodnight	1996	
Loser	2000	
Lost Girl	2010–2015	TV series
The Love Guru	2008	
=== M ===
The Man	2005	
Man of the Year	2006	
The Man from Toronto	2022	
A Map of the World	2000	
Max Payne	2008	
Mean Girls	2004	
Molly Maxwell	2013	
Men with Brooms	2002	
Millennium	1989	
Mimic	1997	
Moonstruck	1987	
The Mortal Instruments: City of Bones	2013	
Mrs. Winterbourne	1996	
Murder at 1600	1997	
Murder by Phone	1982	
Murder in the Hamptons	2005	
My Big Fat Greek Wedding	2002	
=== N ===
Nancy Drew	1995	TV series
Narc	2002	
Nemesis Game	2003	
New York Minute	2004	
Nick of Time	1995	
Nikita	2010-2013	TV series
Nirvanna the Band the Show the Movie	2025	
Nothing Like the Holidays	2008	
Nurse 3D	2013	
=== O ===
One Magic Christmas	1985	
One Week	2008	
Operation Avalanche	2016	
Orphan	2009	
Orphan Black	2013–2017	TV series
Owning Mahowny	2003	
=== P ===
Pacific Rim	2013	
The Pacifier	2005	
PCU	1994	
Pixels	2015	
Polar	2019	
Police Academy	1984	
Police Academy 3: Back in Training	1986	
Police Academy 4: Citizens on Patrol	1987	
Pompeii	2014	
The Prince and Me	2004	
Prom Night	1980	
Prom Night III: The Last Kiss	1990	
Pushing Tin	1999	
=== Q ===
Queer as Folk	2000-2005	TV series, 5 seasons; American and Canadian version of the UK original
=== R ===
The Recruit	2003	
RED	2010	
Red Lights	2012	
The Ref	1994	
Repo! The Genetic Opera	2008	
Repo Men	2010	
Resident Evil	2002	
Resident Evil: Afterlife	2010	
Resident Evil: Apocalypse	2004	
Resident Evil: Retribution	2012	
RFK	2002	
Riding in Cars with Boys	2001	
The Right Way	2004	
RoboCop	2014	
RoboCop: The Series	1994	
The Rocker	2008	
Rookie Blue	2010–2015	TV series
Room	2015	
Rumor Has It…	2005	
=== S ===
The Santa Clause	1994	
Santa Who?	2000	
Saw 3D	2010	
Saw II	2005	
Saw III	2006	
Saw IV	2007	
Saw V	2008	
Saw VI	2009	
Scanners	1981	
Scary Stories to Tell in the Dark	2019	
Scott Pilgrim vs. the World	2010	
The Sentinel	2006	
Serendipity	2001	
Sesame Street Presents: Follow That Bird	1985	
Shazam!	2019	
The Shape of Water	2017	
Sharpay's Fabulous Adventure	2011	
Shoot 'Em Up	2007	
Short Circuit 2	1988	
The Silent Partner	1978	
Silver Streak	1976	
The Skulls	2000	
The Skulls II	2002	
The Skulls III	2004	
Speaking Parts	1989	
Spider	2002	
Splice	2009	
Spotlight	2015	
Star Trek: Strange New Worlds	2022-present	TV series
Strange Brew	1983	
Striking Poses	1999	
The Stupids	1996	
Sue Thomas: F.B.Eye	2002-2005	TV series
Suits	2011-2019	TV series
Suicide Squad	2016	
Superstar: Dare to Dream	1998	
The Sweet Hereafter	1997	
=== T ===
Take the Lead	2006	
Take This Waltz	2011	
Talk To Me	2007	
Textuality	2011	released on DVD under the title Sexting
That Old Feeling	1997	
Thomas and the Magic Railroad	2000	
Three Men and a Baby	1987	
Three to Tango	1999	
The Time Traveler's Wife	2009	
Tommy Boy	1995	
Total Recall	2012	
Traitor	2008	
Trapped in Paradise	1994	
Treed Murray	2001	
True Lies	1994	
Turn It Up	2000	
The Tuxedo	2002	
=== U ===
Undercover Brother	2002	
Urban Legend	1998	
=== V ===
Vendetta	1999	
Videodrome	1983	
The Virgin Suicides	1999	
The Vow	2012	
=== W ===
Waiting for Summer	2012	
War of the Worlds	1988-1990	TV series
Welcome to Mooseport	2004	
Where the Truth Lies	2005	
Wrong Turn	2003	
=== X ===
X-Men	2000	
=== Z ===
Zombies 3	2022	

== Music videos ==
Artist	Title	Year
50 Cent	"God Gave Me Style"	2005
Crash Adams	"Too Hot to Touch"	2020
Addictiv	"Over It (Cry Baby)"	2009
The Airplane Boys	"Still Young"	2012
Aleesia	"Angel"	
Aleesia	"Bubble Gum"	
Anvil	"Mad Dog"	1987
Austra	"Beat And The Pulse"	2011
Barenaked Ladies	"Enid"	1992
Barenaked Ladies	"Lovers In A Dangerous Time"	1991
Barenaked Ladies	"The Old Apartment"	1997
Big Wreck	"That Song"	1998
Blue Rodeo	"Try"	1987
Blue Rodeo	"Superstar"	2016
The Boomtang Boys and Kim Esty	"Pictures"	1999
Boys Brigade	"Melody"	1983
Boys Brigade	"The Passion Of Love"	1983
Paul Brandt	"That's The Truth"	1999
Cancer Bats	"French Immersion"	2006
Brendan Canning	"Love Is New"	
Alessia Cara	"Scars to Your Beautiful"	2016
Chalk Circle	"April Fool"	1986
Choclair	"Let's Ride"	
Kelly Clarkson	"Behind These Hazel Eyes"	2005
Kelly Clarkson	"Already Gone"	2009
Clipse	"Ma, I Don't Love Her"	2002
Cowboy Junkies	"Sun Comes Up Its Tuesday Morning"	1990
The Cranberries	"Animal Instinct"	1999
Anna Cyzon	"Young Boy"	2009
Howie Day	"Collide"	2004
Deadmau5	"Ghosts 'n' Stuff"	
Default	"Wasting My Time"	2001
Delerium feat Leigh Nash	"Innocente (Falling In Love)"	2001
Celine Dion	"You And I"	2004
Melanie Doane	"Happy Homemaker"	1998
Damhnait Doyle	"Tattooed"	2000
Drake	"5 AM In Toronto"	2013
Drake	"Headlines"	2011
Drake	"Started From The Bottom"	2013
Drake	"What's Next"	2021
Drake	"What Did I Miss"	2025
Drake	"Shabang"	2026
Drake	"2 Hard 4 the Radio"	2026
Drake	"National Treasures"	2026
Hemingway Corner	"Man On A Mission"	1993
Hilary Duff and Haylie Duff	"Our Lips Are Sealed"	2004
Hilary Duff	"Play With Fire"	2006
Hilary Duff	"Wake Up"	2005
Duran Duran	"The Reflex"	1984
Econoline Crush	"You Don't Know What It's Like"	2000
The Ennis Sisters	"It's Not About You"	2001
The Ennis Sisters	"I'd Never Walk Away"	2002
Esthero	"That Girl"	1999
Feist	"1234"	2007
Finger Eleven	"Drag You Down"	2000
Glass Tiger	"Someday"	1985
Corey Hart	"Never Surrender"	1985
Haywire	"Bad Boy"	1986
Haywire	"Dance Desire"	1987
Dan Hill	"Sometimes When We Touch"	1994 (Note: The single was released in 1977-78; an official music video was filmed in 1994.)
Honeymoon Suite	"New Girl Now"	1984
JB feat. Nicole Wray and Quinn Mayback	"Good in the Hood"	
The Johnstones	"Gone For A Long Time"	2007
Donnell Jones	"Where I Wanna Be"	1999
k-os	"Crabbuckit"	2004
Kardinal Offishall	"The Anthem"	2010
Kardinal Offishall	"Bakardi Slang"	2000
Chantal Kreviazuk	"Dear Life"	2000
Lady Antebellum	"Need You Now"	2009
Len	"It's My Neighbourhood"	2012
LIGHTS	"Toes"	2011
Lisa Lougheed	"Run With Us"	1987
Loud Luxury Feat. Brando	"Body"	2018
Love Inc.	"Broken Bones"	1998
Maestro Fresh Wes	"Let Your Backbone Slide"	1989
Maestro	"Stick to Your Vision"	1998
Marilyn Manson	"The Beautiful People"	1996
Martha And The Muffins	"Danseparc (Every Day It's Tomorrow)"	1983
Martha And The Muffins	"Echo Beach"	1980
Edward Maya and Mia Martina	"Stereo Love"	2011
Tate McRae	"You Broke Me First"	2020
Melanie C	"Understand"	2008
Kim Mitchell	"All We Are"	1984
The Moffatts	"Misery"	1999
Mudvayne	"Forget to Remember"	2005
Anne Murray	"Now And Forever"	1986
Mýa	"Fallen"	2003
Organized Rhyme	"Check the O.R."	
P Reign	"We Them Niggaz"	2013
Paint	"Boomerang"	2013
Parachute Club	"Rise Up"	1983
Peaches	"Set It Off"	2001
Platinum Blonde	"Not In Love"	1984
Play	"Us Against The World"	2002
Pukka Orchestra	"Listen To The Radio"	1984
The Pursuit Of Happiness	"I'm An Adult Now"	1986
Rihanna	"Pon de Replay"	2005
Rush	"Subdivisions"	1982
Sasha	"If You Believe"	1998
The Shuffle Demons	"Spadina Bus"	1986
Simple Plan	"Jet Lag"	2011
Roni Size	"Brown Paper Bag"	1997
Shawn Mendes	"Life Of The Party"	2014
Snow	"Everybody Wants To Be Like You"	2000
Snow	"Informer"	1992
Snow	"Plumb Song"	2000
The Spoons	"Romantic Traffic"	1984
The Spoons	"You Light Up"	2011
Tears For Fears	"Head Over Heels"	1985
Thirty Seconds to Mars	"The Kill"	2006
Trans-X	"Message On The Radio"	1983
The Trews	"Hope & Ruin"	2011
The Used	"Take It Away"	2004
The Used	"The Bird And The Worm"	2007
The Weeknd	"King of the Fall"	2014
The Weeknd	"Secrets"	2017
The Weeknd	"Wicked Games"	2011
Brock Zanrosso	"Push The Walls"	2011

== See also ==
- Cinema of Canada
