= List of films set in Toronto =

Several Canadian and international films are set in Toronto. Although a number of films are shot in Toronto, not every film uses Toronto as its setting. Films shot in Toronto that do not use the city as its setting are not included in the following list.

== List of films ==
List of films set in Toronto include:

Title	Year	Country(s) (Note: Country(s) in which the film was produced)	Note
The Adjuster	1991	Canada	
Amy George	2011	Canada	
Anne at 13,000 Ft.	2019	Canada	
Antiviral	2012	Canada; France	
Ararat	2002	Canada; France	
Arasangam	2008	India	
The Arrow	1997	Canada	Miniseries
The Art of Woo	2001	Canada	
Bao	2018	United States	2018 Academy Award for Best Animated Short Film winner
Blood and Donuts	1995	Canada	
Bollywood/Hollywood	2002	Canada; India	
Bon Cop, Bad Cop	2006	Canada	
Breakfast with Scot	2007	Canada	
Camilla	1994	Canada; United Kingdom	
Canadian Bacon	1995	United States; Canada	
Childstar	2004	Canada	
Chloe	2009	United States; Canada; France	
Circle of Two	1981	Canada	
Crash	1996	Canada; United Kingdom	
Darkest Miriam	2024	Canada	
Dead Ringers	1988	Canada; United States	
Deadly Eyes	1982	Canada	
Diamond Tongues	2015	Canada	
Down the Road Again	2011	Canada	
Dr. Frankenstein on Campus	1970	Canada	Also known as Flick.
Driven	2001	United States	
Enemy	2013	Canada; Spain	
Exotica	1994	Canada	
The F Word (Note: Released as What If? in some countries)	2013	Canada; Ireland	
Flesh Freaks	2000	Canada	
Foolproof	2003	Canada	
French Kiss	1995	United States; United Kingdom	
Ghosts With Shit Jobs	2012	Canada	
Goin' Down the Road	1970	Canada	
Going the Distance	2004	Canada	
H	1990	Canada	
Hollywood North	2003	Canada	
The Hurricane	1999	United States	
I Love a Man in Uniform	1993	Canada	
I've Heard the Mermaids Singing	1987	Canada	
Ivory Tower	2010	Canada	
Jiminy Glick in Lalawood	2004	United States	
Khaled	2001	Canada	
Kids in the Hall: Brain Candy	1996	Canada	
Kill Them and Eat Them	2003	Canada	
Kismat Konnection	2008	India	
Last Night	1998	Canada	
Let's All Hate Toronto	2007	Canada	
Lie with Me	2005	Canada	
Little Italy	2018	Canada	Little Italy, Toronto
The Life Before This	1999	Canada	
The Love Guru	2008	United States	
Matt and Mara	2024	Canada	
Monkey Warfare	2006	Canada	
Mouthpiece	2018	Canada	
Nirvanna the Band the Show the Movie	2025	Canada	Film based off the web series Nirvana the Band the Show and TV show Nirvanna the Band the Show.
Nobody Waved Good-bye	1964	Canada	
Nothing	2003	Canada	
Outrageous!	1977	Canada	
Owning Mahowny	2003	Canada; United Kingdom	
Paris, France	1993	Canada	
Paying for It	2024	Canada	
The Pee Pee Poo Poo Man	2024	Canada	
Permanent Tourist	2025	Canada	
Picture Day	2012	Canada	
Rude	1995	Canada	
Sabah	2005	Canada	
Saint Monica	2002	Canada	
School's Out	1992	Canada	Television film for Degrassi
Scott Pilgrim vs. the World	2010	United States; United Kingdom; Japan	
Sebastian	2017	Canada	
The Sentinel	2006	United States	
The Shrouds	2024	Canada	
Sidekick	2005	Canada	
The Silent Partner	1978	Canada	
Speaking Parts	1989	Canada	
Stay the Night	2022	Canada	
Strange Brew	1983	Canada	
Sugar	2004	Canada	
Take This Waltz	2011	Canada; Spain; Japan	
Therapy Dogs	2022	Canada	
This Beautiful City	2007	Canada	
This Movie Is Broken	2010	Canada	
The Top of His Head	1989	Canada	
Toronto Apartment	2026	Canada	
Toronto Stories	2008	Canada	
Touch of Pink	2004	Canada; United Kingdom	
Tower	2012	Canada	
Treed Murray	2001	Canada	
Trigger	2010	Canada	
Turning Red	2022	United States	
Twist	2003	Canada	
Victoria Day	2009	Canada	
Videodrome	1983	Canada	
Waiting for Summer	2012	Canada	
When Night Is Falling	1995	Canada	
White Room	1990	Canada	
Zoom	2015	Canada; Brazil	

== See also ==
- List of films based on location
