= Collectible Spoons =

Greatest hits album by Spoons
- Released: 1994
- Recorded: Hamilton, Toronto, New York City 1981–1983
- Genre: New wave; synth-pop
- Length: 46:44
- Label: MCA - MCAD-11186
- Producer: John Punter, Nile Rodgers, Graeme Pole

Spoons chronology
Vertigo Tango (1988)	Collectible Spoons (1994)	Unexpected Guest At A Cancelled Party (2007)

Professional ratings
Review scores
Source	Rating
Allmusic	3/5 stars

Collectible Spoons is a greatest hits collection by the Canadian new wave band Spoons. It includes material from their first four albums on Ready Records (including a couple of tracks from their lesser-known debut album Stick Figure Neighbourhood), but ignores the next two (much more guitar-driven) albums, Bridges Over Borders and Vertigo Tango on Anthem Records. This CD is now out-of-print.

== Track listing ==
1. "Trade Winds" (Gordon Deppe) - 2:15
2. "Nova Heart" (Deppe) - 4:24
3. "Arias & Symphonies" (Deppe) - 4:47
4. "Smiling in Winter" (Deppe, Sandy Horne) - 3:48
5. "Romantic Traffic" (Deppe, Rob Preuss) - 3:33
6. "Tell No Lies" (Deppe) - 2:54
7. "Talk Back" (Deppe, Preuss) - 4:36
8. "Old Emotions" (Deppe, Horne) - 3:41
9. "The Rhythm" (Deppe, Horne) - 4:06
10. "Red Light" (Deppe) - 4:39
11. "Conventional Beliefs" (Deppe) - 3:52
12. "One in Ten Words" (Deppe, Preuss) - 4:09
13. "Blow Away" (Deppe) - 5:57
14. "Nova Heart (Extended Mix)" (Deppe) - 6:41

== Trivia ==
The photo on the front of the album is taken in the CN Tower's Space Deck.

== Personnel ==
- Gordon Deppe - vocals, guitar
- Sandy Horne - vocals, bass
- Rob Preuss - keyboards
- Derrick Ross - drums
