= 11th Canadian Comedy Awards =

Festival and awards ceremony for works of 2009

- Date: 18 October 2010
- Location: Winter Garden Theatre; Toronto, Ontario
- Country: Canada
- Presented by: Canadian Comedy Foundation for Excellence
- Hosted by: Dave Foley

Highlights
- Most wins: Television: Less Than Kind (3); Film The Trotsky (3); Person: Irwin Barker (2)
- Most nominations: Television: Less Than Kind (7); Film: Eating Buccaneers (5); Person: Jeremy Hotz and Pat Thornton (3)
- Website: www.canadiancomedyawards.org

The 11th Canadian Comedy Awards, presented by the Canadian Comedy Foundation for Excellence (CCFE), honoured the best live, television, film, and Internet comedy of 2009. The ceremony was held at the Winter Garden Theatre in Toronto, Ontario, on 18 October 2010 and was hosted by Dave Foley.

Canadian Comedy Awards, also known as Beavers, were awarded in 22 categories. Some winners were picked by members of industry organizations while others were chosen by the Canadian public through an online poll. The awards ceremony was held during the five-day Canadian Comedy Awards Festival which ran from 14 to 18 October and included 38 shows at six venues.

The TV series Less Than Kind led with seven nominations followed by the film Eating Buccaneers with five. Less Than Kind won three Beavers, as did the film The Trotsky. Irwin Barker was posthumously awarded two Beavers and the Dave Broadfoot Award.

== Festival and ceremony ==
The Canadian Comedy Awards (CCA) returned to Toronto, Ontario, in 2010, after a seven-year absence from the city. This was the first occasion that Toronto hosted the Canadian Comedy Awards Festival, which had grown to the point that a larger city could more easily accommodate the events. The five-day festival ran from 14 to 18 October and featured 38 shows in six venues. This included stand-up, sketch, improv, and one-person shows. Venues included Yuk Yuk's, Comedy Bar, Bad Dog Theatre, and Second City.

One notable show was BeerProv in which 18 improvisors competed, drinking beer in successive elimination rounds until one was left. Sean Tabares won the event and later won the Beaver for best male improvisor. Catch 23 was another competitive improv show featuring pairs of performers.

A gala was held on 17 October at the Winter Garden Theatre hosted by Mary Walsh. The awards ceremony was held on 18 October hosted by Dave Foley. Performers included Teresa Pavlinek and Kathryn Greenwood (Women Fully Clothed), Seán Cullen, Gordon Pinsent, Tom Green, and Loretta Swit.

== Winners and nominees ==
Nominees, selected by jury, were announced on 22 June 2010 in Toronto. Awards were given in 22 categories.

Irwin Barker, who had died the day before nominations were announced, won posthumous Beavers for Canadian Comedy Person of the Year and Best Male Stand-up, as well as the Dave Broadfoot Award for comic genius.

Winners are listed first and highlighted in boldface:

=== Multimedia ===
Canadian Comedy Person of the Year	Best Radio Program or Clip
**Irwin Barker**; Seth Rogen; Russell Peters; Colin Mochrie; Brent Butt	"**Monotheism vs. Polytheism**" – **The Debaters (Sean Cullen & Ron Sparks)**; "Ali Rizvi Badshah" – Monsoon House; "Doug, the Last Man on Earth" – The Irrelevant Show; "First Generation Urbanite"; The Sketchersons Radio Show

=== Live ===
Best Taped Live Performance	Best Stand-up Newcomer
**Jon Dore** – **Just For Laughs**; Darcy Michael – Winnipeg Comedy Festival; Mark Forward – Just For Laughs; Sugar Sammy – Live in Concert; Winston Spear – Stand Up & Bite Me	**Mark DeBonis**; Amanda Brooke Perrin; John Hastings; Julien Dionne; Pardis Parker
Best Male Stand-up	Best Female Stand-up
**Irwin Barker**; Chuck Byrn; Jeremy Hotz; Mike Paterson; Pete Zedlacher	**Laurie Elliott**; Allyson Smith; Jo-Anna Downey; Kate Davis; Kristeen von Hagen
Best Male Improviser	Best Female Improviser
**Sean Tabares**; Matt Baram; Ronald Pederson; Sandy Jobin-Bevans; Taz VanRassel	**Naomi Snieckus**, **National Theatre of the World**; Ashley Botting; Jan Caruana; Julie Dumais; Leslie Seiler
Best Sketch Troupe or Company	Best Improv Troupe or Company
**The Imponderables**; Picnicface; She Said What; The Second City; The Sketchersons	**National Theatre of the World**, **The Carnegie Hall Show**; General Fools Improvisational Theatre; Monkey Toast: The Improvised Talk Show; Rapid Fire Theatre; Scratch
Best One Person Show	Best Comedic Play, Revue or Series
**Naughty Little Children**; Chaotica; Harper Girl Does Canada; Her; Hypnotist The Incredible Boris Hilarious Hypnotic Event	**0% Down, 100% Screwed**; Maybe; Morro and Jasp do Puberty; Nursery School Musical; Uncalled For presents Today Is All Your Birthdays

=== Television ===
Best Direction in a Program or Series	Best Writing in a Program or Series
**Kenny Hotz** – **Kenny vs. Spenny**; Brian Roberts – Dan for Mayor Ep. 103; Bruce McDonald – Almost Audrey; Kelly Makin – Less Than Kind; Vivieno Caldinelli – Hotbox	**Mark McKinney** – **Less Than Kind**; Garry Campbell – Less Than Kind; Kenny Hotz – Kenny vs. Spenny; Levi MacDougall and Nathan Fielder – Important Things with Demetri Martin; Pat Thornton, Vivieno Caldinelli, Tim Polley, Graham Wagner, Katie Crown, and Bob Kerr – Hotbox
Best Performance by a Male	Best Performance by a Female
**Dave Foley** – **Less Than Kind**; Brandon Firla – Little Mosque on the Prairie; Ennis Esmer – The Listener; Gavin Crawford – This Hour Has 22 Minutes; Pat Thornton – Hotbox	**Laurie Elliott** – **Almost Audrey**; Alana Johnston – That's So Weird!; Geri Hall – This Hour Has 22 Minutes; Jennifer Irwin – Less Than Kind; Wendel Meldrum – Less Than Kind
Best Performance by an Ensemble
**Jesse Camacho, Wendel Meldrum, Benjamin Arthur, Nancy Sorel, Maury Chaykin, Brooke Palsson** – **Less Than Kind**; Gavin Crawford, Mark Critch, Geri Hall, Cathy Jones, Shaun Majumder – This Hour Has 22 Minutes; Fred Ewanuick, Mary Ashton, Paul Bates, Benjamin Ayres, Suzanne Coy, Agam Darshi, Laurie Murdoch, David Ferry, Lara Jean Chorostecki – Dan for Mayor; Pat Thornton, Sandy Jobin-Bevans, Levi MacDougall, Jeff McEnery, Vivieno Caldinelli, Tal Zimerman – Hotbox; Laurie Elliott, Inessa Frantowski, Agam Darshi, Ryan Kelly, Ingrid Hart – Almost Audrey

=== Film ===
Best Performance by a Male	Best Performance by a Female
**Jay Baruchel** – **The Trotsky**; Brian G. Smith – Chère; Peter Keleghan – Eating Buccaneers; Jeff White – Eating Buccaneers; Pardis Parker – Afghan	**Kristin Booth** – **At Home by Myself...With You**; Geneviève Bujold – The Trotsky; Jessica Paré – Suck; Leah Pinsent – Eating Buccaneers; Shannon Beckner – Eating Buccaneers
Best Direction	Best Writing
**Jacob Tierney** – **The Trotsky**; Brian G. Smith – Chère; Pardis Parker – Two Men, Two Cows, Two Guns; Rob Stefaniuk – Suck; Spencer Maybee – Man v. Minivan	**Jacob Tierney** – **The Trotsky**; Bill Keenan – Eating Buccaneers; Ken Hall and Brian G. Smith – Chère; Pardis Parker – Afghan; Rob Stefaniuk – Suck

=== Internet ===
Best Web Clip
- **Being Erica** – **Erica's Blog** – "**The Phone Message**"
- "Improv Monologue Project #35 George Basil"
- "Running of the Bullshitters"
- "The Button"
- "The Return of Billy Bob on Q"

=== Special awards ===
Chairman's Award	Dave Broadfoot Award
**Harry Doupe**	**Irwin Barker**

== Multiple wins ==
The following people, shows, films, etc. received multiple awards

Awards	Person or work
3	Less Than Kind
3	The Trotsky
2	Irwin Barker

== Multiple nominations ==
The following people, shows, films, etc. received multiple awards

Nominations	Person or work
7	Less Than Kind
5	Eating Buccaneers
4	Hotbox
3	Chère
3	Jeremy Hotz
3	Pat Thornton
3	Suck
3	The Trotsky
3	This Hour Has 22 Minutes
2	Afghan
2	Almost Audrey
2	Dan for Mayor
2	Gavin Crawford
2	Geri Hall
2	Irwin Barker
2	Kenny vs. Spenny
2	Levi MacDougall
2	Laurie Elliott
