= Stick Figure Neighbourhood =

Studio album by Spoons
- Released: 1981
- Recorded: February 1981
- Studio: Grant Avenue Studios, Hamilton, Ontario
- Genre: College rock
- Length: 41:54
- Label: Ready
- Producer: Graeme Pole

Spoons chronology
| Stick Figure Neighbourhood (1981) | Arias & Symphonies (1982) |

Stick Figure Neighbourhood is the debut studio album by the Canadian new wave band Spoons, released 1981 by Ready Records. It received some airplay, and went to the top of the Canadian University radio charts (specifically with songs "Conventional Beliefs" and "Red Light"), but it was their next studio album, Arias & Symphonies (1982) – and its best known single, "Nova Heart" – that were to bring them to prominence.

This album was recorded by Daniel Lanois at the Grant Avenue Studios in Hamilton, Ontario. Its liner notes collectively thank fellow contemporary Toronto bands The Diodes, Martha and the Muffins, and concert promoter Gary Cormier of "The Garys".

As Gordon Deppe mentions in his liner notes for greatest hits album Collectible Spoons (1994), this collection of songs "is a bit rough around the edges, but there are things on it that [are] still very interesting and perplexing."

== Background ==
Stick Figure Neighbourhood was partly inspired by the band's interest in progressive rock, where an emphasis is placed on creating atmospheres as opposed to rhythms. Another inspiration was the show The Prisoner, where songs such as "Dropped Dishes" and "Capitol Hill" reflect situations the show's protagonist Number Six would go through.

"After the Institution" (b/w "My Job") from 1980 was an early song from the group that was left off the album due to the feeling that it was "too new wave". Regardless of the decision, the album still manages to be full of synthesizers, "raunchy" guitars, and pounding drums, all while being held together by Horne's bass.

The track "Ice Age" was originally called "Elephant's Graveyard" but was changed due to the Boomtown Rats' song of the same name. Deppe states that the imagery of "glaciers moving along" are present in both songs. He goes on to explain that – after reading the story on the back cover of Genesis Live – he got the inspiration for "Stick Figure Neighbourhood". The image on the album cover reflects this idea, along with the notion of a typical suburb.

== Reception ==
Despite the album's lack of singles and placement on any mainstream chart, Stick Figure Neighbourhood was well-received by the media. Journalists wrote how the album was "one of the most imaginative debut discs to appear in a long time" and that the band had achieved "an exhilarating blend of textural...melodies, brittle bass lines, rhythmic guitar riffs, and consistent percussion". Many already began to believe that this album was the beginning of the band's bright career.

== Track listing ==
All tracks are written by Gordon Deppe, except where noted.

Side one
| No. | Title | Writer(s) | Length |
|---|---|---|---|
| 1. | "Conventional Beliefs" | | 3:57 |
| 2. | "Stick Figure Neighbourhood" | Gordon Deppe; Sandy Horne | 3:59 |
| 3. | "Red Light" | | 4:42 |
| 4. | "For Tran" | | 3:42 |
| 5. | "Capitol Hill" | | 4:38 |

Side two
| No. | Title | Writer(s) | Length |
|---|---|---|---|
| 6. | "Ice Age" | Horne; Deppe | 4:07 |
| 7. | "Dropped Dishes" | | 3:56 |
| 8. | "Friends in the Media" | | 3:31 |
| 9. | "Only for Athletes" | | 5:28 |
| 10. | "Annita" | | 4:16 |
| Total length: | | | 41:54 |

== Personnel ==
Credits are adapted from the Stick Figure Neighbourhood liner notes.

Musicians

- Gordon Deppe — vocals; guitar
- Sandy Horne — bass guitar; pedals; vocals
- Rob Preuss — synthesizer; piano
- Derrick Ross — drums; percussion
- Hugh Syme — mellotron on "For Tran" and "Only for Athletes"

Production

- Graeme Pole — producer
- Daniel Lanois — recorded by
