= Tell No Lies =

Tell No Lies may refer to:

- Tell No Lies, a novel by Gregg Hurwitz
- "Tell No Lies", a song by Spoons from the Listen to the City soundtrack
- "Tell No Lies", a song by Gotthard from the album Open
