= Film North – Huntsville International Film Festival =

Film festivals in Ontario

Film North - Huntsville International Film Festival
- Genre: International, environmental
- Date: September 18–20, 2014
- Location: Huntsville, Ontario
- Years active: 4
- Founded: 2009
- Website: http://www.filmnorth.net

The Film North – Huntsville International Film Festival (HIFF) is a film festival that takes place annually in Huntsville, Ontario, Canada. Held in September, the festival's mandate is to create a user-friendly environment for emerging Canadian and International Filmmakers. Film North 2014 tookplace at the Algonquin Theatre, Huntsville, Ontario from September 18 to 20. The program was announced in August. Film North is a charitable organization.

== History ==
The Film North – Huntsville International Film Festival was founded by Lucy Molnar-Wing in 2009, and held in Huntsville, Ontario, Canada.

Film North presents a Retrospective Program each year as part of their film studies focus. Film North takes place at the Algonquin Theatre, Huntsville, Ontario, Canada.

The festival's inaugural dates were Thursday, September 23 to Saturday, September 25, 2010. Film North presented 39 short and feature films from around the world, including Canada, the United States, Peru and Belgium. Notably, the film In the Wake of the Flood, Ron Mann's documentary on Margaret Atwood's interactive book tour for her novel The Year of the Flood, was screened at the 2010 event.

West Wind: A Vision of Tom Thomson opened the 2011 Film North 2 festival on September 22, 2011. This documentary explores Tom Thomson's extraordinary contribution to Canada's artistic development, and was directed by Michèle Hozer and Peter Raymont.

The Lifetime Achievement Bull's Eye Award 2011 recipient, Michael Snow, requested screening his 1967 film Wavelength in its original format. Film North found 1600 feet of original film and projector, and drove these up to Huntsville to screen Wavelength.

2012, the third season of Film North included 43 films, of which 31 were Canadian and 15 were world premiers: Dolime Dilemma: Water Proof, Morning Zombies, Sisters In Arms, I Was a Boy, 2 Knocks, One Night Stand, The Ballerina and the Rocking Horse, Angelfish, The Etiquette of Sexting, From Nomad to Nobody, Waiting For Summer, Ostichcized, Zen and the Arts of Distraction, 'Missing' Artist:Unknown, and 6 Canadian Premiers: Fish, Powerful: Energy for Everyone, Duck, Spaghetti fur Zwei, La Cosa in Cima Alle Scale, and Algonquin.

Butter, directed by Jim Field Smith and starring Jennifer Garner, had its Ontario premiere screening, and Antiviral had its first screening since winning the 2012 Toronto International Film Festival's Skyy Vodka Award for Best Canadian First Feature Film.

Artist: Unknown, directed by Craig Goodwill, is the unfolding of a wake for Tom Thomson and was part of the closing night program, which culminated with the Ontario premiere screening of Two Jacks, directed by Bernard Rose and starring Jack Huston, Sienna Miller, Danny Huston and Jacqueline Bisset.

The short film Algonquin had its Canadian premiere at the festival in 2012. The film brought audiences into the heart of Canada's iconic wilderness, Algonquin Park, by following the headwaters that originate and flow out of its highlands. Algonquin was directed by Jeremy Munce and produced by Joel Irwin. Andrew Sheppard and Hugo Kitching were the film's cinematographers.

The 2012 Director's Retrospective selection was Robert Altman's McCabe and Mrs. Miller (1971), starring Warren Beatty and Julie Christie, about the frontier myth of the West.

In 2013, Film North screened 35 films. Awards were presented for the following:

- Best Short Film, S is For Bird, directed by Matt Sadowski
- Best Canadian Emerging Filmmaker, Pretty Thing, directed by E. Mirabelli and M. DeFilippis
- Best Documentary, The Captain's Log, directed by J. Haenel and B. Pfister
- Best Canadian Feature Length Film, Sex After Kids, directed by Jeremy Lalonde
- Best Animated Film, The Snow Spirit, directed by L. Salas Rejes

The Retrospective Series' theme was "Representations of Stand Up Comedy In Feature Film". The films The King Of Comedy, directed by Martin Scorsese, and Louis CK: Hilarious, directed by Louis CK, were screened.

The opening night feature was Fight Like Soldiers, Die Like Children, directed by Patrick Reed, produced by Peter Raymont. This won the Golden Antler Viewer's Choice Award. The Friday shorts program screened 20 films, and the night's feature was the Canadian premiere of All Is Lost, directed by J.C. Chandor and starring Robert Redford.

The closing night feature was Who The F--k Is Arthur Fogel, directed by Ron Chapman, which was preceded by the 1965 short film Genevieve, starring Geneviève Bujold and directed by Michel Brault.

On September 21, 2013, Brault died of a heart attack while travelling to the festival to receive its Bull's Eye Lifetime Achievement Award. Festival founder Lucy Wing praised Brault as "a champion of Canadian cinema and among Canada’s short list of trailblazing filmmakers of the 20th century."

== Film submission criteria ==
Each year the Film North Festival selects a number of feature films and short films. Films that are selected to be in one of five competition programs are eligible for jury prizes in their respective categories.

- Best Animated Film - any feature or short length film incorporating animation
- Film North Best Documentary Film - any documentary work with a running time of at least 70 minutes
- Film North Feature Length Film - any narrative work of fiction or nonfiction with a running time of at least 70 minutes
- Film North Short Length Film - any narrative film with a running time of 70 minutes or less, or any documentary film with a running time of 50 minutes or less
- Film North Viewer's Choice Film - any short or feature length film

== 2010 winners ==
Award	Film	Director
Film North Best Feature Award	Son of the Sunshine	Ryan Ward
Best Short Film Award	The Lake	Mike Humble
RBC Best Environmental Film Award	El Perro Del Hortelano	Renzo Zanelli
Golden Antler Viewers Choice Award	At Home by Myself...With You	Kris Booth

- Trading Bay Grouse and Trout Club Bull’s Eye Award for Lifetime Achievement - Graeme Ferguson

== 2011 winners ==
Award	Film	Director
Film North Best Feature Award	Who Loves the Sun	Matt Bissonnette
Best Short Film Award	The Dance	Pardis Parker
RBC Best Environmental Film Award	Saving America's Horses: A Nation Betrayed	Katia Louise
Golden Antler Viewers Choice Award	Moon Point	Sean Cisterna
Best Documentary	TO in 24	Dale Hildebrand
Best Documentary	Into the Fire	Producers Bryan Law, Steven Davies

- Trading Bay Grouse and Trout Club Bull’s Eye Award for Lifetime Achievement - Michael Snow, presented by Graeme Ferguson

== 2012 winners ==
Award	Film	Director
Film North Best Feature Award	Waiting for Summer	Senthil Vinu
Best Short Film Award	Morning Zombies	Lewis Hodgson
Best Environmental Film Award	Carbon for Water	Evan Abramson and Carmen Elsa Lopez
Golden Antler Viewers Choice Award	2 Knocks	Jeremy Robertson
Best Documentary	Sisters in Arms	Beth Freeman
Film North Special Jury Award Winner		The Blue Flame Collective

- Riaz Tyab Bull's Eye Lifetime Achievement Award - Sheila McCarthy

== 2013 winners ==
Award	Film	Director
Film North Best Canadian Feature Award	Sex After Kids	Jeremy Lalonde
Best Short Film Award	S is for Bird	Matt Sadowski
Best Animated Film Award	The Snow Spirit	Lorena Salas Reyes
Golden Antler Viewers Choice Award	Fight Like Soldiers, Die Like Children	Patrick Reed
Best Documentary	The Captain's Log	Ben Pfister and Dirt Haehnel
Best Emerging Canadian Filmmaker	Pretty Thing	E. Mirabelli and M. DeFilippis

- Bull's Eye Lifetime Achievement Award - Michel Brault

== Recognition ==
- Film North branding by concrete.ca, part of the 2010 exhibition at the AIGA National Design Center

== See also ==
- Film festivals in North and Central America
- Toronto International Film Festival
