= Unexpected Guest =

Unexpected Guest may refer to:

== Film ==
- An Unexpected Guest, a 1909 silent film
- Unexpected Guest (film), a 1947 Hopalong Cassidy Western
- Unexpected Guest (1997 film), a 1997 film short
- Unexpected Guest (2010 film), a 2010 comedy film short

== Literature ==
- The Unexpected Guest (play), a 1958 Agatha Christie play
- The Unexpected Guest (novel), a 1999 Charles Osborne novelization of a 1958 Agatha Christie play

== Music ==
- Unexpected Guests, a 2009 Hip Hop album by MF Doom
- The Unexpected Guest, a 1982 album by Demon

== See also ==
- Unexpected Guest at a Cancelled Party, a 2007 New Wave album by the band Spoons
