= Static in Transmission =

Studio album by Spoons
- Released: March 29, 2011
- Recorded: Sky Studios, Guelph, Ontario
- Genre: Synth-pop
- Length: 43:08
- Label: Universal Canada; Fontana North
- Producer: Jeff Carter

Spoons album chronology
Unexpected Guest at a Cancelled Party (2007)	Static in Transmission (2011)	New Day New World (2019)

Singles from Static in Transmission
- 1. "Imperfekt" Released: 2010; 2. "You Light Up" Released: 2011

Static in Transmission is the eighth studio album by the Canadian new wave band Spoons. Released in early 2011 on CD and iTunes, it is their first album of new material in 23 years since 1988's Vertigo Tango.

== Background and writing ==
After playing the new song "Imperfekt" live at a 2010 concert in Toronto, the band was approached by Universal music to record an album of all new material. Following this, the band released a promo CD single for "Imperfekt", b/w "Breaking In" in July 2010. Two additional new songs from the album were previewed online in Dec. 2010.

In a December 2010 interview, Gordon Deppe explained: "It wasn't until we recorded Imperfekt that I thought we had something. At a Spoons rehearsal, everyone went, 'wow, what's that.' And seeing that reaction got me excited. I am very self-doubting when I do anything creative, but the moment I get a little spark and some affirmation, I go, 'okay,' and will write more." According to Deppe, the remaining songs were written in a six-month period in 2010 and roughly in the order they appear on the album.

The album was recorded at producer Jeff Carter's studio in Guelph, Ontario using the PreSonus recording system. The music video for the first single "You Light Up" was filmed in Toronto, Ontario.

== Cover art ==
The cover for the CD features a picture of Sandy Horne and Gordon Deppe and numerous symbols and signs including Morse code, circuit diagrams and even hieroglyphics. Fans who purchased the album were challenged to find secret codes that would unlock two additional bonus downloads on the band's official website.

== Track listing ==
All songs written by Gordon Deppe.

1. "Breaking In" – 4:35
2. "Imperfekt" - 4:28
3. "Numb" - 3:51
4. "Star Maps" - 4:05
5. "Escape with You" - 4:22
6. "You Light Up" - 4:24
7. "B Movie" - 4:35
8. "End of Story" - 4:40
9. "Words Will Smash Walls" - 4:30
10. "Closing Credits" - 4:30

== Personnel ==
Band members

- Gordon Deppe - vocals, guitars, keyboards
- Sandy Horne - bass guitar, vocals

Production

- Jeff Carter - producer, synth, sequencing, graphic design
