= Talkback (album) =

Studio album by Spoons
- Released: 1983
- Recorded: 1982
- Studio: Sounds Interchange (Toronto)
- Genres: Pop; techno-pop
- Length: 40:26
- Label: Ready
- Producer: Nile Rodgers

Spoons chronology
Arias & Symphonies (1982)	Talkback (1983)	Listen to the City (1984)

Singles from Talkback
- 1. "Old Emotions" Released: 1983; 2. "The Rhythm" Released: 1983; 3. "Talk Back" Released: 1984

Talkback is the third studio album by the Canadian new wave band Spoons. It was released in 1983 by Ready Records. The tracks that received airplay in Canada were "Old Emotions", "The Rhythm" and "Talk Back". A music video was also produced for "Old Emotions", directed by Rob Quartly. This is the first Spoons album produced by Nile Rodgers.

The album was released on CD for the first time in Canada by Ready Records on 22 January 2010. The CD includes the Nile Rodgers-produced singles "Tell No Lies" and "Romantic Traffic", which were recorded after the initial release of the Talkback album.

== Critical reception ==
The Globe and Mail deemed the album "good techno-pop" and "too shy by half to be great dance music."

== Track listing ==
Side one
No.	Title	Writer(s)	Length
1.	"Talk Back"	Gordon Deppe; Rob Preuss	4:36
2.	"Camera Shy"	Deppe	4:06
3.	"My Favourite Page"	Deppe	3:58
4.	"Don't Shoot the Messenger"	Deppe; Preuss	3:16
5.	"Time Stands Still"	Deppe	5:01

Side two
No.	Title	Writer(s)	Length
6.	"Old Emotions"	Deppe; Sandy Horne	3:40
7.	"Stop"	Deppe; Horne	3:08
8.	"Out of My Hands"	Deppe	3:46
9.	"Quiet World"	Deppe	4:35
10.	"The Rhythm"	Deppe; Horne	4:20
Total length:			40:26

2010 CD bonus tracks
No.	Title	Writer(s)	Length
11.	"Tell No Lies"	Deppe	4:12
12.	"Romantic Traffic"	Deppe; Preuss	3:35

== Personnel ==
Credits are adapted from the Talkback liner notes.

Spoons

- Gordon Deppe — vocals; guitar
- Sandy Horne — bass; vocals
- Rob Preuss — electronic keyboards and piano
- Derrick Ross — drums

Production and artwork

- Nile Rodgers — producer
- Jason Corsaro — engineer
- Vic Pyle — assistant engineer at Sounds Interchange
- Bob Ludwig — mastering at Masterdisk, New York City
- Peter Noble — photography; cover concept
- Dale Heslip — design; cover concept
- Spoons — cover concept
