= New Day New World =

Studio album by Spoons
- Released: 22 March 2019
- Studios: Sky Studios, Guelph, Ontario
- Genres: New wave; synth-pop; pop rock
- Label: Sparks Music
- Producer: Jeff Carter

Spoons chronology
Static in Transmission (2011)	New Day New World (2019)

Singles from New Day New World
- 1. "Beautiful Trap" Released: 16 October 2017; 2. "For the First and Last Time" Released: 9 June 2019; 3. "All the Wrong Things (In The Right Places)" Released: 2019

New Day New World is the ninth studio album by the Canadian new wave band Spoons. It was released on 22 March 2019 on CD, vinyl, digital download, and through streaming. It is the band's first studio album in over eight years.

== Background ==
After the release of Spoons' previous album from 2011, Static in Transmission, Gordon Deppe noted that he felt it was to be the last Spoons album, but as life went on he realized he had more to say. The songs "Beautiful Trap" and "For the First and Last Time" were originally performed live as far back as 2015, but on 16 October 2017, the former was released as a free downloadable single on the Spoons' website.

The album was recorded at bassist Sandy Horne and producer Jeff Carter's studio in Guelph: Sky Studios. This was the same studio used for Static in Transmission. Horne's daughter, Alexis, performs background vocals on one of the songs, and Deppe's son, Matthew, has his piano melodies featured on "Life on Demand" and "Landing Lights". An online contest was held for the album's first single, "All the Wrong Things (In The Right Places)", where fans could submit chants to be featured in the final mix of the song's chorus.

The cover and the name of the album were influenced by one another. While finding ideas to use for the cover, the band came across a photographer online who had the picture available. The album was not necessarily going to be called New Day New World, but due to the subject matter and feelings evoked by the photograph, they found the name of the song to be fitting.

On 9 June, one of three music videos were released for the album. "For the First and Last Time" features Deppe as a paranormal investigator in a seemingly-empty castle; little does he know the spirit (played by Horne) he is looking for is on his trail the entire time. Directed by former ghost-hunter Peter Sacco of the show the Paranormal Profilers, the first chapter of the three-part story was selected for eight international film festivals ranging from the Cannes Short Film Festival to the Jaipur International Film Festival. The video also was screened at the Indo Global Film Festival and Virgin Spring Cinefest, where it took home the award for best director and music video, respectively.

On 21 November the second installment of videos was released, this time for "All the Wrong Things (in the Right Places)".

== Track listing ==
All tracks are written by Gordon Deppe except where noted.

No.	Title	Writer(s)	Length
1.	"New Day New World"		3:32
2.	"All the Wrong Things (In The Right Places)"	G. Deppe, S. Horne	3:20
3.	"Beautiful Trap"		4:45
4.	"Repeatable"	G. Deppe, S. Horne	3:53
5.	"Life on Demand"	G. Deppe, M. Deppe	4:14
6.	"For The First and Last Time"		4:54
7.	"Perfect Exception"	G. Deppe, S. Horne	3:58
8.	"Landing Lights"	G. Deppe, M. Deppe	4:29
9.	"Paint By Numbers Day"		4:34
10.	"Snowglobes"	G. Deppe, S. Horne	3:32
11.	"Love Recall"		3:18
12.	"New Day New World II"		2:01

== Personnel ==
Band members

- Gordon Deppe - lead vocals, guitar
- Sandy Horne - bass guitar, additional vocals
- Chris McNeill - drums
- Casey MQ - keyboards

Production

- Jeff Carter - producer, engineer, mastering
