= Arias & Symphonies =

Studio album by Spoons
- Released: October 1982
- Recorded: 1982
- Studio: Sounds Interchange, Toronto; AIR Studios, London
- Genre: New wave; techno-pop; pop
- Length: 44:11
- Label: Ready (CA) / A&M (US, UK, and EU)
- Producer: John Punter

Spoons chronology
Stick Figure Neighbourhood (1981)	Arias & Symphonies (1982)	Talkback (1983)

Singles from Arias and Symphonies
- 1. "Nova Heart" Released: 1982; 2. "Arias and Symphonies" Released: 1982; 3. "Smiling in Winter" Released: 1982

Professional ratings
Review scores
Source	Rating
Allmusic	3.5/5 stars

Arias & Symphonies is the second studio album by the Canadian new wave band Spoons. It was released in October 1982 by Ready Records. It contains the highly successful singles "Nova Heart" and "Arias & Symphonies". It was first released on CD in 2000. In 2012, a 30th Anniversary Edition of the album was released on CD with bonus tracks, which are mostly live recordings from Barrymore's, Ottawa, October 26, 1982, originally recorded and broadcast by CHEZ-FM. The iTunes download version includes an extra "live CD" of their performance at the El Mocambo in Toronto, June 26, 1982, which was originally broadcast by CHUM-FM.

The photograph on the album cover is from the Spanish Riding School in Vienna, Austria.

== Background ==
After the release of the band's debut studio album, Stick Figure Neighbourhood (1981), Gordon Deppe stated "the album, it wasn't a good representation of what we were capable of...we've got the same kind of attitude towards life but...the songs are taking us around the world. We're getting out of the neighbourhood."

Deppe continued by noting that the songs for Arias & Symphonies would be more dance oriented, as their European influences, such as Orchestral Manoeuvres in the Dark and Peter Hammill, have done.

Arias & Symphonies was named one of the 20 Most Influential Albums of the 1980s by The Chart Magazine, and the song "Nova Heart" garnered a spot in Bob Mercereau's book "The Top 100 Canadian Singles".

== Track listing ==
Side one
No.	Title	Writer(s)	Length
1.	"Trade Winds"	Gordon Deppe	2:15
2.	"Smiling in Winter"	Deppe; Sandy Horne	4:06
3.	"One in Ten Words"	Deppe; Rob Preuss	4:10
4.	"No Electrons"	Deppe	5:12
5.	"No More Growing Up"	Deppe; Preuss; Horne	3:26
6.	"Arias & Symphonies"	Deppe	4:48

Side two
No.	Title	Writer(s)	Length
7.	"Nova Heart"	Deppe	5:46
8.	"South American Vacation"	Deppe; Preuss; Horne	4:12
9.	"A Girl in Two Pieces"	Deppe; Horne	4:28
10.	"Walk the Plank"	Deppe	4:27
11.	"Blow Away"	Deppe	5:58
Total length:			40:26

30th Anniversary Edition bonus tracks
No.	Title	Writer(s)	Length
12.	"Test Sample (Live)"	Deppe; Horne	2:52
13.	"Tunnels for Testing Wings (Live)"	Deppe	3:11
14.	"Broken (Live)"	Deppe; Horne	4:03
15.	"Walk the Plank (Live)"	Deppe	4:27
16.	"Symmetry (Live)"	Deppe; Horne	5:26
17.	"Blow Away (Live)"	Deppe	5:53
18.	"Nova Heart (Singularity Mix - Edit)"	Deppe	4:04

30th Anniversary Edition iTunes-only live "CD 2"
No.	Title	Writer(s)	Length
1.	"Nova Heart"	Deppe	5:59
2.	"No Electrons"	Deppe	4:49
3.	"One in Ten Words"	Deppe; Preuss	4:07
4.	"Red Light"	Deppe	4:36
5.	"No More Growing Up"	Deppe; Preuss; Horne	3:33
6.	"Arias & Symphonies"	Deppe	4:39
7.	"Ice Age"	Horne; Deppe	4:18
8.	"Walk the Plank"	Deppe	4:28
9.	"Western Romance"	Deppe	4:33
10.	"Friends in the Media"	Deppe	3:49
11.	"Symmetry"	Deppe; Horne	5:41
12.	"Annita"	Deppe	6:22
13.	"Spanish Eyes"	Deppe	3:27
14.	"Nova Heart"	Deppe	6:38

== Personnel ==
Credits are adapted from the Arias & Symphonies liner notes.

Spoons

- Gordon Deppe — vocals; guitar
- Sandy Horne — bass guitar; vocals
- Rob Preuss — Jupiter IV; SH-2000
- Derrick Ross — drums; percussion

Production

- John Punter — producer; mixer
- Mike Jones — engineer
- Robert DiGioia — assistant engineer
- Carey Gurden — assistant engineer
