= William Phillips (director) =

Canadian film director and screenwriter

- Occupations: Film director Screenwriter
- Years active: 1997–present

William Phillips is a Canadian film director and screenwriter. After graduating from the University of Toronto with a bachelor of science, Phillips studied film at Ryerson University. Phillips then ran a film production company entitled Grandview Products and worked on the second-unit of the film Cube. After directing two short films, Milkman and Deep Cut, Phillips wrote and directed his first feature film in 2001, Treed Murray. The film earned five Genie Awards nominations including Best Motion Picture. Williams has since directed two more major Canadian films, Foolproof and Gunless.

== Selected filmography ==
- Milkman (1997, short film)
- Deep Cut (1998, short film)
- Treed Murray (2001)
- Foolproof (2003)
- Gunless (2010)
