= Gunless =

- Directed by: William Phillips
- Written by: William Phillips
- Produced by: Niv Fichman; Stephen Hegyes; Shawn Williamson
- Starring: Paul Gross; Sienna Guillory; Dustin Milligan; Tyler Mane; Callum Keith Rennie; Graham Greene
- Cinematography: Gregory Middleton
- Edited by: Susan Maggi
- Distributed by: Alliance Films
- Release date: 30 April 2010
- Running time: 89 minutes
- Country: Canada
- Language: English
- Budget: $10 million (CA$)

Gunless is a 2010 Canadian Western comedy film directed by William Phillips and released by Alliance Films.

== Plot ==
In 1878, a hardened American gunfighter Sean Lafferty (Paul Gross), known as the Montana Kid, has a bounty on his head for killing 11 people across the Western United States. He arrives in a small town in the foothills of the Canadian Rockies, a place that does not understand or appreciate the brutal code of the American Wild West. After being helped off his horse by a young Chinese girl named Adell (Melody B. Choi), he goes to the town general store. After leaving the store, he finds his horse gone and accuses Jack (Tyler Mane), the blacksmith, of stealing it, though Jack was simply replacing the horse's damaged shoes. After unsuccessfully trying to intimidate the blacksmith, the Montana Kid decides to call him out to a duel. Since the blacksmith has no gun, though, Sean cannot shoot him because the Kid lives by a code of ethics that prevents him from killing unarmed men.

Local resident Jane Taylor (Sienna Guillory), says the Kid can have her broken gun (to fix and give to Jack) if he builds her a windmill. Sean proceeds to go with her and stays in a sod house at her farm, alternately working on the windmill and repairing the gun. After a few days, however, the Kid begins to develop feelings toward Jane, while also becoming friends with the townsfolk.

In the meantime, a roaming band of American bounty hunters crosses into Canada and heads for the town to claim the price on Sean's head. In time, Sean has finally fixed Jane's pistol and the duel takes place, but Sean adjusts his aim to miss Jack, providing an indication that he is done running and may want to die. Sean tells Jack to pull the trigger, but the gun jams. Sean takes the gun back from Jack to inspect it, but accidentally sets it off, instead, with the ricocheting bullet hitting Jack in the left buttock. After Dr. Angus Schiffron (Jay Brazeau) removes the fragmented bullet from Jack's buttock, Sean and Jack declare themselves even, with the former preparing to leave town.

As Sean is riding out of town, the bounty hunters arrive. They threaten the townsfolk to get them to turn over Sean. The townsfolk instead train their rifles and shotguns on the bounty hunters with the intent of defending themselves. Sean returns, and not wanting any more bloodshed, tells bounty hunter leader Ben Cutter (Callum Keith Rennie) that he will go with them if Ben agrees to leave everyone else alone.

Cutter accepts, but town resident Larry (Michael Eklund) sets off a pile of dynamite that he had placed under a large tree stump by his farmhouse to get the stump out of the ground. This sparks a gunfight between the bounty hunters on one side against Sean and the townsfolk on the other. The battle ultimately ends in the town's favour after the Kid takes out Ben's crew without killing any of them. The bounty hunters end up being escorted out of Canada by the local detachment of the North-West Mounted Police, and Sean decides to remain in town. Ostensibly, this is because of debts he has to pay off, but also because he wants to be with Jane.

== Cast ==
- Paul Gross as Sean Lafferty, the Montana Kid
- Sienna Guillory as Jane
- Dustin Milligan as Corporal Jonathan Kent
- Callum Keith Rennie as Ben Cutter
- Tyler Mane as Jack Smith
- Graham Greene as Two Dogs
- Michael Eklund as Larry

== Production ==
The production was filmed at Osoyoos, British Columbia, on an estimated budget of CA$10 million.

== Release ==
The film was released by Alliance Films in Canada on 30 April 2010.

== Reception ==
The film has received mainly mixed reviews. On the review aggregator website Rotten Tomatoes, 40% of 5 critics' reviews are positive.

- Citytv – "... it looked like a production that should be airing on the CBC rather than in the theatre."
- Fast Forward Weekly (mixed) – "Yes, it's a comedy and a fun one at that, but the lack of depth and substance leaves you with all the satisfaction and aftertaste of a Tim Hortons doughnut."
- The Globe and Mail – "Gunless is harmless, the sort of pop entertainment that sets its sights low and doesn't underachieve."
- National Post – "As funny as necessary, but not necessarily funny."
- Toronto Star – "The humour in Gunless is more sitcom than scathing, playing like something that could have been called Corner Gas 1882."
- Toronto Sun (positive) – "... it'll probably be the least depressing Canadian film this year. A feel-good experience, in fact."
- Winnipeg Free Press – "The movie is sporadically amusing, but it works against itself in a couple of ways, most notably in casting affable Canuck Paul Gross as a violent Yank."
- Vancouver Sun – "It's a genial enough comedy that's a combination of love story, cultural critique, farce and revenge yarn, which means it's none of them."

== See also ==
- The Montana Kid
