= Shannon Thunderbird =

- Born: British Columbia
- Origin: Canada
- Occupations: Singer-songwriter, speaker, educator, playwright, author
- Website: www.shannonthunderbird.com

Shannon Thunderbird is a Coast Tsimshian First Nations singer-songwriter, speaker, educator, recording artist, playwright, and author.

== Biography ==
Thunderbird was born in British Columbia. She is an Elder of the Giluts'aaw tribe, Royal House of Niis'gumiik, Gispwudwada (Orca) Clan. She is an artist and educator and a medicine wheel teacher who communicates time-honoured indigenous knowledge through workshops/seminars, drumming circles, stage shows, and the written word. Thunderbird, along with her performance partner Sandy Horne (of the Canadian synthpop band the Spoons), have performed throughout Canada, Europe, and Asia. They have also presented to over three hundred and fifty thousand students in elementary, secondary schools, universities and colleges across Canada and the United States. She is Owner, President, and Artistic Director of Teya Peya Productions, a First Nations arts/education company she founded in 1991 that includes the Thunderbird Native Theatre and Red Cedar Sisters Vocal Trio.

Her touring shows include "Eagle Thunder: Song of Hope," "Daughter of the Copper Shield," "Thunder Rolling in the Mountains," "Wolf Thunder: Big Drums Are Calling!", "Turtle Thunder Sings," and "Sweet Thunder Medicine Wheel." She has also taught "Thunder Wolf" songwriting, vocals, and drumming and "Spirit Thunder" drumming and vocal workshops celebrating cultural diversity and North American Indigenous cultures.

Thunderbird is an advocate for Indigenous rights, pointing out the injustice and repercussions of the Indian Act of 1876. She is also an advocate for anti-colonial education, elevating the status of Indigenous art, and the right of Indigenous women to take part in drumming.

As of 2005, Thunderbird resides in Ontario.

== Written works ==
- Truth and Timelessness: Indigenous Medicine Wheel Knowledge. 2020

=== As contributor ===
- Featured Contributor: We Do It This Way, ED. Dr. April Go Forth, Thoz Womenz Inc., Alturas, California, 2014
- Terry, Claire, ed. (2008). The Art of Living: A Practical Guide to Being Alive. Barcelona: Editorial Kairós S.A. ISBN 9788472456860. OCLC 276818193.

== Discography ==
- May Your Spirit Be Strong (2003)
- Wind Centre (with Sandy Horne) (2011)
- Red Cedar Sisters (due out 2020)
