= Pardis Parker =

Canadian actor, director and comedian

- Born: Sri Lanka
- Notable work: Mideast Minute, Uncivil, Free, Life in Pieces, Little Mosque on the Prairie, Combat Hospital, Single White Spenny, The New Yorker, The New York Times, TED
- Website: www.pardisparker.com

Pardis Parker is a Canadian director, writer, actor, and comedian. He's the creator and star of Comedy Central's Mideast Minute, the co-creator of Uncivil, a new sitcom in development at NBC, and the creator of Free, a new comedic drama in development at Amazon Prime.

== Career ==
Parker is the creator or co-creator of three series for TV and streaming.

Created by and starring Parker, Mideast Minute is a satirical news show distributed on Comedy Central's digital platform. The series satirizes U.S. propaganda efforts, particularly the Congress-funded Alhurra network, by trying to convince Middle Easterners that everything's OK in the Middle East.

In writing about the show, the Jerusalem Post said Parker had a "sharp, smart tone," Uproxx said Parker's "timing is impeccable," and Tubefilter said Parker was "both timely and funny — a combination that works."

Co-created by Parker, Uncivil is a single-cam comedy in development at NBC about a pair of friends – a prosecutor and public defender – who find that their personal squabbles spill into the courtroom and that their professional disputes follow them home. Parker executive produces with Hazy Mills Productions' Sean Hayes and Todd Milliner, as well as with Bradley Gardner and co-creator Rell Battle. Universal Television is the studio.

Free is a half hour comedic drama in development at Amazon Prime. Plan B Entertainment – led by partners Brad Pitt, Dede Gardner, and Jeremy Kleiner – is the production company.

== Stand-up Comedy ==
A six-time Canadian Comedy Award nominee and a finalist for Canada's Next Top Comic and Bite TV's Stand Up and Bite Me, Parker won British star David Baddiel's international stand-up competition and previously became the first Canadian ever to book the CBS Comedy Showcase.

In reviews of his live show, the Kingston Herald said that "the skill with which Pardis Parker weaved the audience through his set was impressive," that Parker was "really relaxed on stage," and that "it felt as though you were just hanging out with a really funny friend," while Ottawa Life Magazine said that "his self-deprecating manner and friendly stage presence make him highly likeable." The Daily Star listed Parker as one of their "Stand-up Comedians That Need Your Attention," and said they "highly recommend" his act. Vulture, in selecting his stand-up clips as one of their "Best Comedy Videos of the Month" in March 2021 and December 2021, said that "it's amazing to see a funny comedian become a great comedian," and that Parker's "a performer who's found his comfort zone."

Parker has had multiple stand-up comedy performances broadcast on TV, radio, and the web, and he's a frequent performer at the Hollywood Improv, Hollywood Laugh Factory, and World Famous Comedy Store.

=== TED Talks ===
Parker has performed three times at TED, twice as a speaker and once as a special guest host.

He performed at the global TED Conference in Monterey, California, in August 2021. His TED Talk, "I'm Tired of People Telling Me to Grind", was released in January 2022. Moda Magazine listed it as one of their "Seven TED Talks to Get You Through the Day," and said Parker's performance was both "relatable" and "hilarious."

Parker performed for a second time at the global TED Conference in Vancouver, Canada, in April 2022. His talk, "I'm Terrified of Wanting to be a Billionaire", was released in October 2022. In reviews of the conference, Mats Lederhausen said Parker's performance was "truly funny," and Chris Duffy said Parker's set was "incredible."

Parker took the stage for a third time at the global TED Conference in Vancouver, Canada, in April 2023.

== Acting ==
Parker has appeared in Life in Pieces on CBS, Combat Hospital on ABC, Little Mosque on the Prairie on CBC, Single White Spenny and Moderation Town on Showcase, Really Me on The Family Channel, and in indie drama Snow.

His acting work has received acclaim from the National Screen Institute of Canada, which remarked that his "timing and body language in The Dance was exceptional," from Indiewire, which complimented his "light comedic touch," and from Radio Canada, which said that "he's a kind of Seth MacFarlane, someone extremely multi-talented who can write, direct, and act, and who's very convincing in his roles."

== Writing ==
Parker's writing has been published by The New Yorker, The New York Times, The New York Review of Books, The Los Angeles Review of Books, the Chicago Sun-Times, The New Quarterly, Weekly Humorist, Literary Hub, Electric Literature, The Markaz Review, and McSweeney's. His first piece of short fiction, "Good Person," was named runner-up for the Peter Hinchcliffe Short Fiction Award, and his humor piece, "I am the NY Times Connections Puzzle and I am the Reason Everyone is Angry," was named Electric Literature's Most Popular Post of 2025.

=== Bibliography ===
Title	Type	Originally published in	Date	Notes
Offer and Counteroffer	Cartoon	The New Yorker	June 23, 2020	
Illegal Milk	Personal Essay	The New York Review of Books	November 4, 2020	Subject of CBC News report.
The Bear Chased Us. Then We Chased the Bear.	Personal Essay	The New York Times	May 14, 2021	
I Like My Cops Like I Like My Surgeons: Cautious, and Not Looking to Kill Me	Satire	McSweeney's	May 15, 2020	
That Word Does Not Mean What You Think It Means	Satire	McSweeney's	June 15, 2020	
An Open Letter to the T&T Supermarket Clerk Who Was Told to 'Go Back to China' as Part of a Customer’s Racist Tirade in Mississauga, Ontario	Satire	McSweeney's	July 31, 2020	
An Open Letter to the National Rifle Association	Satire	Chicago Sun-Times	July 30, 2020	
Expect less.	Satire	Chicago Sun-Times	December 7, 2020	
Thank God We've Come to Our Senses	Satire	Los Angeles Review of Books	November 4, 2020	
My Brain is a Snake	Cartoon	Literary Hub	February 16, 2021	
Mousetrap	Cartoon	Weekly Humorist	September 9, 2022	
I am the NY Times Connections Puzzle and I am the Reason Everyone is Angry	Satire	Electric Literature	September 24, 2025	Electric Literature's Most Popular Post of 2025.
Good Person	Fiction	The New Quarterly	Fall Issue, 2025	Runner-up for 2025 Peter Hinchcliffe Short Fiction Award.
We Ran the Numbers	Fiction	The Markaz Review	November 6, 2026	

== Filmmaking ==
Parker's films and music videos, including The Dance, Afghan, and Two Men, Two Cows, Two Guns, have screened at over 150 film festivals worldwide and received over 80 awards and nominations.

The Playlist called him an "up and coming talent on the Canadian film scene," Film School Rejects said his work was "riotously funny, with a narrative flair that makes one hope he has a feature coming soon," and CinemaSinema lauded his ability to "squeeze more heart from an 11 minute short film than many Hollywood directors can muster from feature length pictures."

=== Filmography ===
Year(s)	Title	Director	Writer	Cast
2008	Afghan	Yes	Yes	Pardis Parker, Mark Little
2009	What Goes Around Comes Around (music video)	Yes	Yes	
2009	Don't Turn Around (music video)	Yes	Yes	
2010	Two Men, Two Cows, Two Guns	Yes	Yes	John Dunsworth, Levi Macdougall
2010	Implants	Yes	Yes	Pardis Parker, Evany Rosen
2011	The Dance	Yes	Yes	Pardis Parker, Evany Rosen
2012	The Train	Yes	Yes	Pardis Parker, Colin Mochrie
2013	Jash Ugly Sweater Contest	No	Yes	Sarah Silverman, Michael Cera, Reggie Watts, Tim & Eric

=== Accolades ===
Year	Award	Category	Title	Result
2008	CBC Short Film Face-Off	Best Film	Afghan	Finalist
2009	Just for Laughs	Best of Just for Laughs	Afghan	Won
2009	ViewFinders International Film Festival	Best Short Film	Afghan	Won
2010	Films in Bloom	Audience Award	Afghan	Silver
2010	Moondance International Film Festival	Atlantis Award	Afghan	Won
2010	Twin Rivers Media Festival	Award of Excellence	Afghan	Won
2010	Atlanta Philosophy Film Festival	Audience Choice Award	Afghan	Won
2010	Desiderata Film Festival	Audience Award	Afghan	1st
2010	Screaming Ant Film Festival	Best Narrative Film	Afghan	Won
2010	Screaming Ant Film Festival	Featured Filmmaker Award	Afghan	Won
2010	Canadian Comedy Awards	Best Writing, Film	Afghan	Nominated
2010	Canadian Comedy Awards	Best Performance by a Male, Film	Afghan	Nominated
2011	Buttered Corn on the Cob Film Festival	Juror Pick	Afghan	Won
2011	Big Dam Film Festival	People's Choice Award	Afghan	Won
2011	Margaret River Shorts Film Festival	Best Film	Afghan	Finalist
2011	Imago Film Festival	1–15 Minutes	Afghan	1st
2011	World Music and Independent Film Festival	Best Actor	Afghan	Nominated
2011	World Music and Independent Film Festival	Best Screenplay	Afghan	Nominated
2011	World Music and Independent Film Festival	Best Supporting Actor	Afghan	Nominated
2011	Athens International Film Festival	Best Short Narrative	Afghan	3rd
2011	Creative Arts Film Festival	Best Short Film	Afghan	Won
2011	Creative Arts Film Festival	Best Editing	Afghan	Won
2011	Creative Arts Film Festival	Best Sound Design	Afghan	Won
2011	Creative Arts Film Festival	Best Original Score	Afghan	Won
2011	Creative Arts Film Festival	Best Director	Afghan	Nominated
2011	Creative Arts Film Festival	Best Cinematography	Afghan	Nominated
2012	Next Wave Art Salon	Time Arts Award	Afghan	Won
2010	Twin Rivers Media Festival	Best Short Drama	Two Men, Two Cows, Two Guns	2nd
2010	JamFest Indie Film Festival	Best Experimental Comedy Short	Two Men, Two Cows, Two Guns	Silver
2010	NBC Universal Short Cuts Film Festival	Best Film	Two Men, Two Cows, Two Guns	Semi-Finalist
2010	South Dakota Film Festival	Jury Award	Two Men, Two Cows, Two Guns	Won
2010	TriMedia Film Festival	Best of the TriMedia Film Festival	Two Men, Two Cows, Two Guns	Won
2010	Wet Your Pants Comedy Film Festival	Best Short Film	Two Men, Two Cows, Two Guns	Won
2010	Montgomery Film Festival	Best Film	Two Men, Two Cows, Two Guns	Won
2010	Montgomery Film Festival	Best Comedy	Two Men, Two Cows, Two Guns	Won
2010	Montgomery Film Festival	Audience Award	Two Men, Two Cows, Two Guns	Won
2010	Canadian Comedy Awards	Best Direction, Film	Two Men, Two Cows, Two Guns	Nominated
2011	Derby City Film Festival	Best Short Film	Two Men, Two Cows, Two Guns	Nominated
2011	Griffon International Film Festival	Best Comedy	Two Men, Two Cows, Two Guns	Won
2011	Buttered Corn on the Cob Film Festival	Juror Pick	Two Men, Two Cows, Two Guns	Won
2011	Lakeshorts International Film Festival	Best Comedy	Two Men, Two Cows, Two Guns	Won
2011	Tallahassee Film Festival	Best Narrative Short	Two Men, Two Cows, Two Guns	Nominated
2011	World Music and Independent Film Festival	Best Director	Two Men, Two Cows, Two Guns	Nominated
2011	World Music and Independent Film Festival	Best Actor	Two Men, Two Cows, Two Guns	Nominated
2011	World Music and Independent Film Festival	Best Supporting Actor	Two Men, Two Cows, Two Guns	Nominated
2011	Santa Catalina Film Festival	Best Short	Two Men, Two Cows, Two Guns	Finalist
2011	Detroit Windsor International Film Festival	Best Short Comedy	Two Men, Two Cows, Two Guns	Won
2011	Screaming Ant Film Festival	Best Narrative Film	Two Men, Two Cows, Two Guns	Won
2011	Screaming Ant Film Festival	Featured Filmmaker Award	Two Men, Two Cows, Two Guns	Won
2012	SENE Film Festival	Best of SENE	Two Men, Two Cows, Two Guns	Won
2010	Twin Rivers Media Festival	Award of Excellence	Don't Turn Around	Won
2011	World Music and Independent Film Festival	Best Hip-Hop Music Video	Don't Turn Around	Nominated
2011	World Music and Independent Film Festival	Most Creative Music Video	Don't Turn Around	Nominated
2010	Twin Rivers Media Festival	Award of Excellence	What Goes Around Comes Around	Won
2011	Rincon International Film Festival	Best Music Video	What Goes Around Comes Around	Won
2011	World Music and Independent Film Festival	Best Director	What Goes Around Comes Around	Won
2011	World Music and Independent Film Festival	Best Rock Music Video	What Goes Around Comes Around	Nominated
2011	World Music and Independent Film Festival	Most Creative Music Video	What Goes Around Comes Around	Nominated
2011	World Music and Independent Film Festival	Best Cinematography	What Goes Around Comes Around	Nominated
2012	TriMedia Film Festival	Best Music Video	What Goes Around Comes Around	Nominated
2011	Margaret River Shorts Film Festival	Best Film	Implants	Finalist
2011	Beloit International Film Festival	Best Short Film	Implants	Finalist
2011	Playboy Imaginative Filmmakers Spotlight	Grand Prize	Implants	Finalist
2011	Creative Arts Film Festival	Best Dramatic Short Film	Implants	Nominated
2011	Creative Arts Film Festival	Best Screenplay	Implants	Nominated
2011	Creative Arts Film Festival	Best Sound Design	Implants	Nominated
2011	Creative Arts Film Festival	Best Director of Photography	Implants	Nominated
2011	JamFest Indie Film Festival	Best Experimental Comedy Short	The Dance	Gold
2011	Carmel Art and Film Festival	Best of Shorts	The Dance	Won
2011	PEI International Film Festival	Best Maritime Short	The Dance	Won
2011	Film North - Huntsville International Film Festival	Best Short Film	The Dance	Won
2011	SNO Boston Film Festival	Best Foreign Filmmaker	The Dance	Won
2011	Dixie Film Festival	Best Comedy	The Dance	Won
2011	Urban Mediamakers Film Festival	Best International Short	The Dance	2nd
2012	Big Dam Film Festival	Best of Show	The Dance	3rd
2012	Imago Film Festival	Audience Choice Award	The Dance	Won
2012	Buttered Corn on the Cob Film Festival	Best of the Fest	The Dance	Won
2012	Wet Your Pants Comedy Film Festival	Best Short Film	The Dance	Won
2012	World Music and Independent Film Festival	Best Director	The Dance	Nominated
2012	World Music and Independent Film Festival	Best Actor	The Dance	Nominated
2012	World Music and Independent Film Festival	Best Cinematography	The Dance	Nominated
2012	Canadian Comedy Awards	Best Performance by a Male, Film	The Dance	Nominated
2012	Canadian Comedy Awards	Best Writing, Film	The Dance	Nominated
2012	Humanity International Film Festival	Best Local Film	The Dance	Won
2012	Humanity International Film Festival	Best Canadian Film	The Dance	Won
2012	Humanity International Film Festival	Best Comedy	The Dance	Won
2012	SENE Film Festival	Best of SENE	The Dance	Won
2012	Boston Comedy Festival	Audience Choice Award	The Dance	2nd
2012	Forster Film Festival	Creativity Award	The Dance	Won
2013	National Screen Institute of Canada	Best Comedy	The Dance	Won
2012	South Texas Underground Film Festival	The Right Stuff Award	The Train	Won
2012	Urban Mediamakers Film Festival	Best Short Film Under 2 Minutes	The Train	Won
