= Therapy Dogs (film) =

2022 film by Ethan Eng

- Theatrical release poster
- Directed by: Ethan Eng
- Screenplay by: Ethan Eng; Justin Morrice
- Produced by: Walter Woodman; Patrick Cederberg; Matthew Hornick; Ethan Eng; Justin Morrice
- Starring: Justin Morrice; Ethan Eng; Kevin Tseng; Kyle Peacock
- Cinematography: Ethan Eng
- Edited by: Ethan Eng
- Music by: Sam Ray
- Production companies: Therapy Dogs Productions; Shy Kids; Zapruder Films
- Release dates: January 27, 2022 (Slamdance); March 10, 2023
- Running time: 83 minutes
- Country: Canada
- Language: English

Therapy Dogs is a 2022 documentary-comedy film directed by Ethan Eng and written by Eng and Justin Morrice. It starred Kevin Tseng alongside the film's writers. The movie first premiered in January at the Slamdance Film Festival, making Eng the youngest filmmaker to premiere at this festival. Eng was 17 years old at the time of the festival and had been working on the film's production as early as Grade 10.

The coming-of-age film delves into the lives of two best friends attending Cawthra Park Secondary School, a Mississauga high school just past Toronto. Eng and Morrice are seventeen year-olds who endeavor to produce a video for their yearbook and graduating class of 2019 as they find themselves grappling with adolescence, growing up, identity, the boundaries they push, and the recklessness and intensity of male adolescence. The film also features interviews with many of their fellow, unsuspecting high school students.

== Awards and nominations ==
Therapy Dogs was a New York Times Critics Pick. Eng received an AGBO Fellowship with the Russo brothers.

Awards for Therapy Dogs
Festival	Award	Result	Ref.
Guanajuato International Film Festival	Best International Feature Film	Won	
Guanajuato International Film Festival	Festival Prize	Nominated	
NOAM Faenza Film Festival	Best Film	Won	
Slamdance Film Festival	Best Narrative Feature	Nominated	
