= Vertigo Tango =

Studio album by Spoons
- Released: 1988
- Genres: New wave; synth-pop
- Length: 42:28
- Label: Anthem
- Producer: John Punter

Spoons album chronology
| Bridges Over Borders (1986) | Vertigo Tango (1988) | Unexpected Guest at a Cancelled Party (2007) |

Singles from Vertigo Tango
- 1. "When Time Turns Around" Released: 1988; 2. "Waterline" Released: 1989; 3. "Sooner or Later" Released: 1989

Professional ratings
Review scores
| Source | Rating |
|---|---|
| AllMusic | 3/5 stars |

Vertigo Tango is the fifth studio album by the Canadian new wave band Spoons, released in 1988 by Anthem Records.

A moderate commercial success, Vertigo Tango spun off two singles that hit the mid-reaches of the Canadian charts: "When Time Turns Around" and "Waterline". The group disbanded after the tour to support this album, though they would sporadically reunite in the following years.

== Track listing ==
| No. | Title | Writer(s) | Length |
|---|---|---|---|
| 1. | "Sooner or Later" | Deppe | 3:46 |
| 2. | "When Time Turns Around" | Deppe, MacDonald | 3:38 |
| 3. | "Shaking the Fear" | Deppe, Horne | 4:15 |
| 4. | "Waterline" | Deppe | 5:00 |
| 5. | "Vertigo Tango" | Deppe, Horne | 4:33 |
| 6. | "Bed of Nails" | Deppe | 4:36 |
| 7. | "The Opening Curtain" | Deppe | 4:22 |
| 8. | "I've Been Here Before" | Deppe, Horne, MacDonald | 4:03 |
| 9. | "Through the Hazy" | Deppe, MacDonald | 4:03 |
| 10. | "Game Above Your Head" | Deppe, Horne | 3:52 |

=== Singles ===
- "When Time Turns Around" (ANS-081)
- "Waterline" (ANS-082)
- "Sooner or Later" (ANS-084)

== Personnel ==
- Gordon Deppe - lead vocals, guitar
- Sandy Horne - vocals, bass guitar
- Scott MacDonald - vocals, keyboards
- Steve Kendry - drums, percussion

=== Production personnel ===
- John Punter - producer; mixing
- Simon Dawson - engineer
- Mastering at Masterdisk, New York City
- Recorded at Rockfield Studios, Wales
