= The Markaz =

Nonprofit organization with focus on the Middle East and North Africa

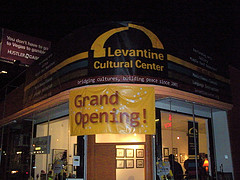
The Levantine Cultural Center

The Markaz (literally "the center"), originally The Levantine Cultural Center, was a nonprofit organization in Los Angeles, which existed from 2001 until 2020. It offered artistic and educational programs focusing on the Middle East and North Africa, with classes and workshops for ethnic communities. After the closure of the center due to the COVID-19 pandemic, the instead organization founded an online journal, The Markaz Review.

== History ==
The center was founded in 2001 by a group of activists, artists and business professionals. Its original name was Levantine Cultural Center, but it changed its name to The Markaz at the end of June 2015. It presented artistic, educational, and outreach programs related to the Middle East and North Africa regions.

The organization lost 501(c)(3) status on April 15, 2014, for failing to file Form 990s for three consecutive years.

The center was closed in May 2020 due to the COVID-19 pandemic, and the organization instead founded an online journal, The Markaz Review.

== Activities ==
The center produced or co-sponsored artistic programs encouraging cross-cultural and multidisciplinary collaborations, and collaborated with the multi-faith Pico Union Project.

Authors, artists and producers have collaborated with the center. Other activities included open evenings about Islam.
