= Spoons (band) =

Canadian new wave band

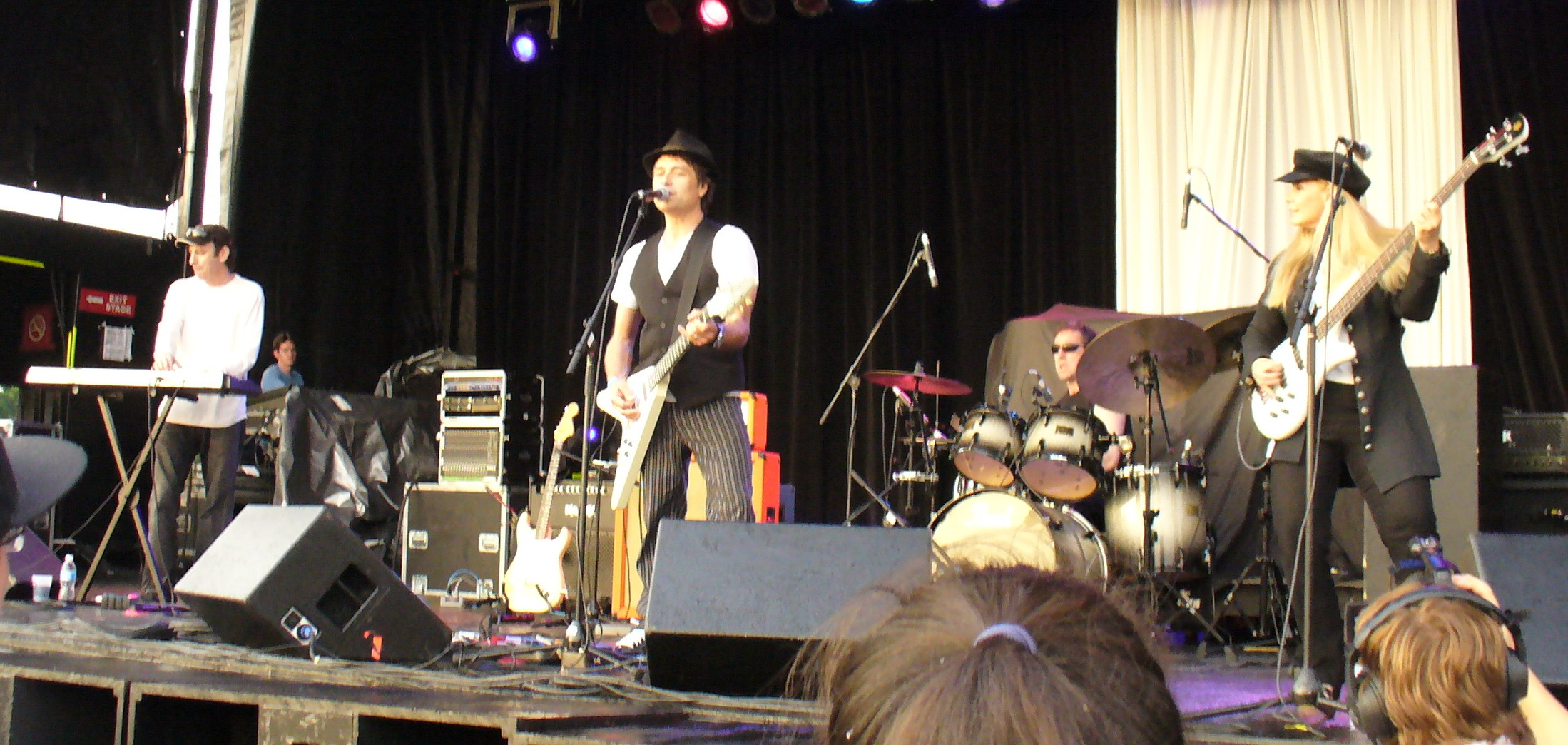
- Spoons performing at the 2008 Friendship Festival in Fort Erie, Ontario

Background information
- Also known as: The Spoons
- Origin: Burlington, Ontario, Canada
- Genres: New wave; synth-pop; post-progressive
- Years active: 1979–1990; 1994–1996; 1999; 2002–present
- Labels: Universal; MapleMusic; Ready; Anthem; A&M; Mercury
- Members: Gordon Deppe; Sandy Horne; Chris McNeill; Scott MacDonald
- Past members: Rob Preuss; Derrick Ross; Brett Wickens; Peter Shepherd; Steve Kendry; Casey MQ; Steve Sweeney; Colin Cripps
- Website: spoonsmusic.com

Spoons is a Canadian new wave band, formed in Burlington, Ontario in 1979. They released several Canadian chart hits between 1982 and 1989, and in 1983, they were nominated for Most Promising Group of the Year at the Juno Awards. Their most popular songs include "Romantic Traffic", "Nova Heart", "Old Emotions", and "Tell No Lies".

== History ==
=== Early years and influences (1979–1981) ===
Spoons was formed in Burlington, Ontario, in 1979. The band initially consisted of Gordon Deppe (lead vocals and guitar), Sandy Horne (vocals and bass), Brett Wickens (keyboards and synthesizers), and Peter Shepherd (drums). Deppe, Horne, and Wickens attended Aldershot School, and Deppe and Horne (the only constant members of the band) dated in high school. The band got their name as the members were eating alphabet soup at Brett Wickens' home. While tossing around potential names, they all stared at their spoons in union and "there was no turning back."

Early in their history, they would play the work of their European influences. Unfortunately, audiences were not enamored by the styles of Genesis and other progressive rock groups, making the band change course for something more "light, bouncy, and... danceable". The entire band was influenced by OMD, who inspired a greater keyboard presence in the Spoons' sound. Gary Numan, Talking Heads, Simple Minds, and John Foxx's Ultravox were also influential on the band's musical evolution. Their new synth-pop sound gained a better response from audiences, and the style stuck.

In late 1979, Shepherd left the band and was replaced by Derrick Ross on drums. Spoons then released an independent single, "After the Institution", in 1980 on Mannequin Records, produced by the band and former member Shepherd. Shortly thereafter, Wickens left the band to release an electronica album as part of the duo Ceramic Hello, also on Mannequin Records, and later became a graphic designer designing album covers for such artists as Peter Gabriel. He was replaced by keyboardist Rob Preuss, who was only fifteen when he joined Spoons.

The band's debut studio album, Stick Figure Neighbourhood, was released in 1981, and is notable for being one of the earliest new wave albums engineered by Daniel Lanois. The album was popular on the Canadian University charts, and allowed the group to eventually tour Ontario and Quebec with bands like Martha and the Muffins. Carl Finkle, who left Martha and the Muffins in 1981, would go on to manage the Spoons during their "Nova Heart" fame.

=== Gaining popularity (1982–1985) ===
The following year, Spoons released their breakthrough studio album Arias & Symphonies. This album spawned three Top 40 hits in Canada: "Nova Heart", "Arias & Symphonies", and "Smiling in Winter". All were dance-oriented new wave hits, and the band was awarded a U-Know Award for Most Promising Group.

Around this time, Spoons' higher profile allowed them to become the opening act for bands such as Culture Club, Simple Minds, and the Police.

Spoons' 1983 studio album, Talkback, was produced by Nile Rodgers. Rodgers had been approached to produce tracks for Culture Club, but after seeing them in concert, he was unimpressed with that band's reliance on backing tapes – he was, however, taken with Spoons' opening set, and elected to produce them instead. The Talkback album included the hit "Old Emotions", but was not issued outside of Canada – a disappointment for the band after working with a producer of Rodgers' international stature.

Following that, the band expanded their sound somewhat, releasing a two-sided hit in 1984 with "Tell No Lies" b/w "Romantic Traffic", both also produced by Rodgers. The upbeat "Tell No Lies" featured a more mainstream pop sound than was customary for Spoons; the song won a CASBY Award for best single. The song also featured a memorable music video that featured the band in a travel adventure gone awry. The caper featured cameos from Toronto radio personality Live Earl Jive and musician Nash the Slash.

"Romantic Traffic" was a downtempo song with adult-oriented radio-friendly leanings that would become the group's most enduring hit. Around this time, the band recorded commercials for Maxell, Pepsi-Cola, and signed a six-figure promotional deal with Thrifty's Clothing Stores, a cross-Canada chain, and were featured in the store's radio, TV, and print ads.

Both "Tell No Lies" and "Romantic Traffic" later found their way onto the soundtrack for the film Listen to the City (1984), in which Horne was featured in a supporting role. However, Listen to the City was not a Spoons album, as it consisted largely of instrumental music and was credited solely to Gordon Deppe.

=== Decline, hiatus and reunion shows (1985–2004) ===
Late in 1985, Spoons left their label, new wave imprint Ready Records, which had been unable to secure international releases for their material; Ready Records went out of business soon after. The band signed to the more rock-oriented Anthem Records label and welcomed Bob Muir, former Virgin Records Canada president, as manager. Muir believed that the deal with Thrifty's may have damaged the credibility of the band due to the commercial sponsorship "shifting the public's emphasis from their music to their consumer image".

Around this time, Preuss and Ross left Spoons, and were replaced by Scott MacDonald (keyboards) and Steve Kendry (drums), respectively. The 1986 single "Bridges Over Borders" marked a departure from their characteristic sound and showcased a harder rock orientation, as did later single "Rodeo".

Both singles appeared on the 1986 studio album Bridges Over Borders, but the release was a commercial disaster as it did not chart in the Canadian Top 100, nor did any of the three singles pulled from the album. The follow-up studio album Vertigo Tango reunited the band with Arias & Symphonies producer John Punter, and was a partial return to the band's new wave roots. The album featured the band's final hit singles, the rollicking "When Time Turns Around" and "Waterline" (1989), a languid, introspective ballad. Both videos were in featured rotation on Much Music, the main Canadian music video channel.

Spoons took a break from recording in the 1990s to allow time to focus on family, but Deppe, Horne, and various other players reunited for several Spoons reunion gigs in the 1990s and into the next decade.

=== Regroup and continued activities (2006–present) ===
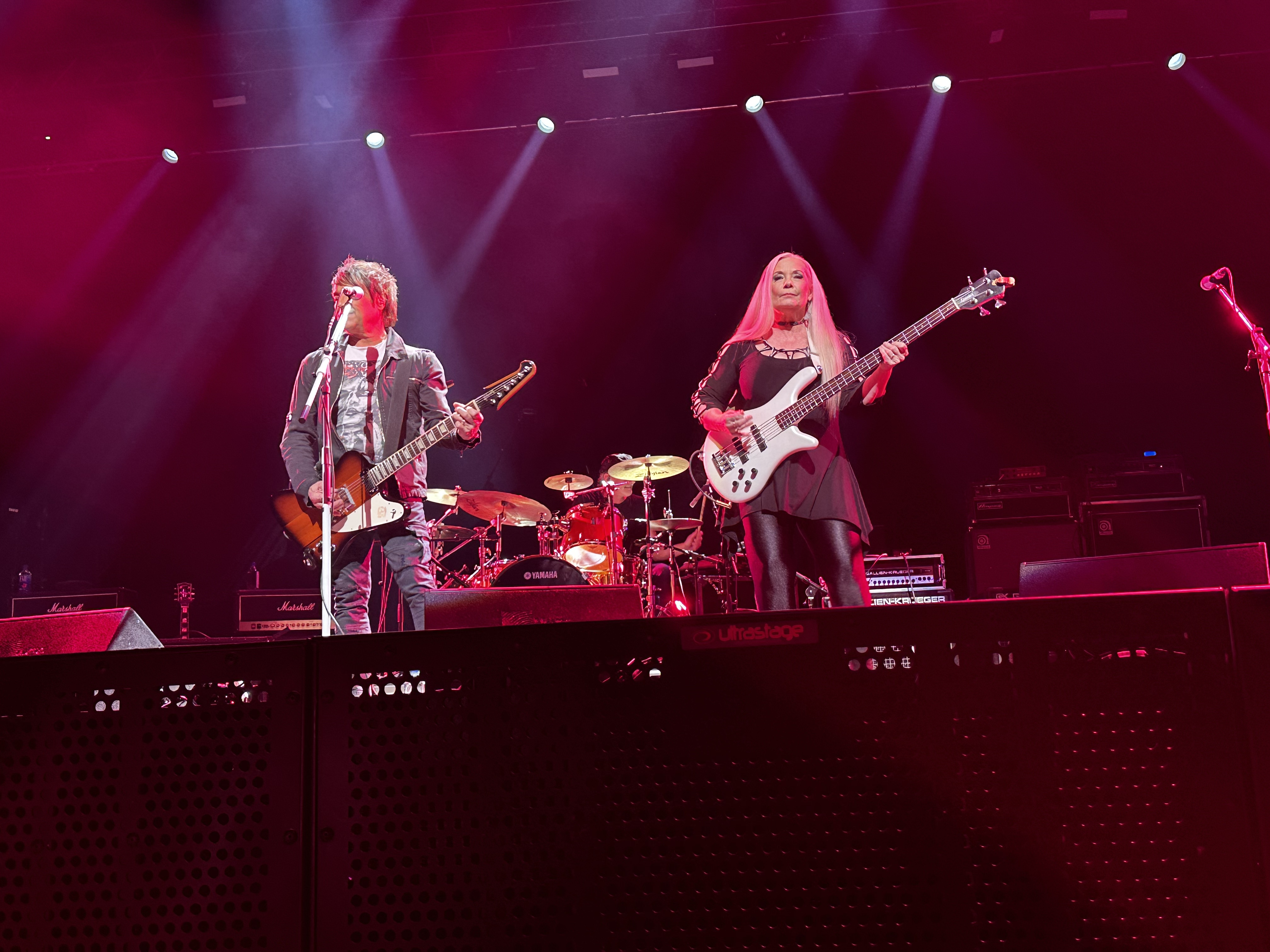
Spoons performing in Niagara Falls, February 2024

In 2007 the band released Unexpected Guest at a Cancelled Party, a collection of previously unreleased material recorded between 1982 and 1985 by the Deppe, Horne, Preuss and Ross line-up.

In 2008, Limited Edition was released. It is a greatest-hits of sorts and was released on the Ready Records Imprint to replace the out of print Collectible Spoons.

In 2010 at the Woodbine Park Summerfest for Vinyl 95.3, the band released its first new studio work in over 20 years - the double A-Side "Imperfekt/Breaking In" which was limited to 100 copies. In the Spring of 2010, a Spoons line-up of Deppe and Horne, with producer Jeff Carter, began recording their sixth studio album, Static in Transmission. The first single released from these sessions was the limited-edition "Imperfekt" b/w "Breaking In". Only a few hundred CD singles were released with a few being made available for fans. The release date for Static in Transmission was March 29, 2011.

On Canada Day 2012, Spoons once again performed at Woodbine Park for Vinyl 95.3's Red, White, and Vinyl event. Their newest CD EP marking 30 Years of "Nova Heart" was made available.

In August 2012, Spoons headlined the Spirit of the Eighties fundraiser concert in Lewiston, New York. This was the first time the band had played in the United States since 1989. They enjoyed their reception so much that they returned to the festival the following August and shared the headline with Images in Vogue. The two bands would then embark on the Rewind the Tape tour the same year. This tour's Toronto date served as the release party for the remastered CD version of Stick Figure Neighbourhood.

On November 13, 2012, Spoons released the 30th Anniversary Edition of their Arias & Symphonies album on CD and through digital download. This was followed by the band playing a series of shows with Rob Preuss and Derrick Ross, temporarily reuniting the classic 1980s line-up. They would reunite again in 2014 for the 30th anniversary of "Romantic Traffic" and "Tell No Lies".

On March 22, 2019, Spoons released the studio album, New Day New World, on CD, vinyl, and digital release via iTunes and Spotify. New Day New World was the first studio project to be released by the Spoons in over eight years. The first single off the album was "For the First and Last Time". An online contest was held for the release of the second single, "All the Wrong Things (In the Right Places)", where fans could submit recordings of themselves singing a part of the song's chorus to be included in the final mix. It is planned to 3 videos produced by Peter Sacco, for the album's singles, "For the First and Last Time", "All the Wrong Things (In the Right Places)", and "Beautiful Trap", that will have a connecting story and theme between the 3 videos. The video of "For the First and Last Time" was selected for 35 film festivals around the globe, winning awards at 10. The "All the Wrong Things in the Right Places" video has already been selected at 15 festivals and won at 6.

On January 9, 2020, it was announced that Scott MacDonald had returned to the band on keyboards.

== Post-Spoons careers ==
Gordon Deppe:

- has a pop rock trio called Five Star Fall.
- his band "The Lost Boys" routinely play the Ivy Arms in Milton, Ontario, Shakespeare Arms in Guelph, and the various Bier Market locations in Toronto.
- was a programmer for the 1980s music channel on Galaxie digital radio.
- performs with the band A Flock of Seagulls as of 2018

Sandy Horne:

- formed the bands Hurricane Jane and Dog Won't Bite
- performs and tours with Coast Tsimshian singer-songwriter, storyteller, recording artist Shannon Thunderbird, a First Nations artist from Northern British Columbia

Rob Preuss:

- played with Honeymoon Suite on their Racing After Midnight album.
- played keyboards for Cats and Miss Saigon
- is the Associate Musical Director for Mamma Mia! at the Winter Garden Theatre in New York City.
- co-hosts #TOAST, a Toronto Mike'd podcast, with Bob Willette and Mike Boon

Brett Wickens:

- collaborated with Kinetic Ideals, Andy McCluskey of OMD, Jah Wobble, William Orbit, Peter Hook of New Order, and Martha Ladly.
- has done album cover design work with Peter Saville Associates.
- is a partner in the San Francisco design firm, Ammunition.

Derrick Ross:

- was head of the indie label, FRE Records
- worked with a subsidiary record label owned by EMI Music Canada.
- became Vice President of EMI Music Canada.

Scott MacDonald:

- taught middle school science in Hamilton, Ontario, from 1998 until 2001.
- previously lived in Europe with his wife and family, and teaches at the Anglo-American School of Sofia, in Sofia, Bulgaria
- currently resides in Hamilton, Ontario.

== Discography ==
=== Studio albums ===
Title	Release	Peak chart positions	Certifications
Title	Release	CAN	Certifications
Stick Figure Neighbourhood	Release date: February 1981; Label: Ready	—	
Arias & Symphonies	Release date: October 1982; Label: Ready/A&M	20	CAN: Gold
Talkback	Release date: October 1983; Label: Ready	29	CAN: Gold
Bridges Over Borders	Release date: 1986; Label: Anthem/Mercury	—	
Vertigo Tango	Release date: October 1988; Label: Anthem/Mercury	79	
Static in Transmission	Release date: March 29, 2011; Label: Fontana North	—	
New Day New World	Release date: March 22, 2019; Label: Sparks Music	—	
"—" denotes releases that did not chart.

=== Soundtrack albums ===
- Gordon Deppe – Listen to the City (1984)

=== Compilation albums ===
- Collectible Spoons (1994)
- Unexpected Guest at a Cancelled Party (2007)
- Limited Edition (2008)
- Repeatable 1980–2020 (2021)
- Echoes (2021)

=== DVDs ===
- Spoons Live in Concert (Toronto 1982 & Montreal 1984) (2006)

=== Singles ===
Title	Release	Peak chart positions	Album
Title	Release	CAN	Album
"After the Institution"	1980	—	non-album single
"Nova Heart"	1982	40	Arias & Symphonies
"Arias & Symphonies"	1982	18	Arias & Symphonies
"Smiling in Winter"	1982	30	Arias & Symphonies
"Old Emotions"	1983	28	Talkback
"The Rhythm"	1983	—	Talkback
"Talkback"	1984	—	Talkback
"Tell No Lies"	1984	34	Listen to the City
"Romantic Traffic"	1984	55	Listen to the City
"Bridges Over Borders"	1986	—	Bridges Over Borders
"Be Alone Tonight"	1986	—	Bridges Over Borders
"Rodeo"	1987	—	Bridges Over Borders
"When Time Turns Around"	1988	68	Vertigo Tango
"Waterline"	1989	44	Vertigo Tango
"Sooner or Later"	1989	—	Vertigo Tango
"Imperfekt"	2010	—	Static in Transmission
"You Light Up"	2011	—	Static in Transmission
"Beautiful Trap"	2017	—	New Day New World
"All the Wrong Things (In The Right Places)"	2019	—	New Day New World
"—" denotes a recording that did not chart.
