= Brandon Firla =

Canadian actor and comedian

Brandon Firla is a Canadian actor and comedian best known for his role as Jonathan Sidwell, an investment banker, in Suits. Previously in Canada, he played Clark Claxton on the television sitcom Billable Hours. In season four of Little Mosque on the Prairie in late-September 2009, he began a role as the new Anglican priest in town, Reverend Thorne.

== Filmography ==
=== Film ===
Year	Title	Role	Notes
2004	Chicks with Sticks	Alex Perkins	
2005	Santa's Slay	Officer #1	
2006	Plan Live from Outer Space	Jeff Trent	
2006	Man of the Year	Grimaldi	
2008	Finn on the Fly	Bob	
2009	At Home by Myself...With You	Dentist	
2010	Score: A Hockey Musical	Don Mohan	
2013	I'll Follow You Down	Jimmy / Johnny	
2013	Bank$tas	Pistol Pete	
2018	Vice	Jay Bybee	

=== Television ===
Year	Title	Role	Notes
2001	Band of Brothers	Lt. Brewer	Episode: "Replacements"
2002	The 5th Quadrant	Marcus Reynolds	Episode: "I'm Gonna Git You Goatsucka"
2002	Trackers	Alien #2	Episode: "What Lies Beneath"
2003	Good Fences	Princeton Man	Television film
2004	Call Me: The Rise and Fall of Heidi Fleiss	Comic Book Actor	Television film
2005	Dawn Anna	Interviewer	Television film
2006	Angela's Eyes	Charles Amster	Episode: "Eyes for Windows"
2006–2008	Billable Hours	Clark Claxton III	26 episodes
2007	The Robber Bride	West	Television film
2008	Daniel's Daughter	Jeffrey Lerner	Television film
2008	Bridal Fever	Paul	Television film
2009	Before You Say I Do	Jack Harrington	Television film
2009	The Jon Dore Television Show	Fake Writer #1	Episode: "Jon Wants Justice"
2009–2011	Little Mosque on the Prairie	Rev. William Thorne	43 episodes
2010	Fairfield Road	Randall Henderson	Television film
2011	Dan for Mayor	Nigel Ellen	Episode: "Political Liability"
2013	But I'm Chris Jericho!	Clark Cooper	Episode: "Actor Off"
2013–2014	Suits	Jonathan Sidwell	12 episodes
2014	Lost Girl	Darren Clare	Episode: "Waves"
2016	Pretty Little Liars	Gil	2 episodes
2017	Modern Family	Scott Hunter	Episode: "Brushes with Celebrity"
2019	Carter	Duff Stubbins	Episode: "Harley Gets A Hole in One"
2022	Never Have I Ever	Mr Brighton	Episode: "...Had a breakdown"
