= At Home by Myself...With You =

2009 Canadian comedy-drama film

- Promotional poster
- Directed by: Kris Booth
- Written by: Kris Booth; Ramona Barckert
- Produced by: Bryce Mitchell
- Starring: Kristin Booth; Aaron Abrams; Shauna MacDonald; Ryan Blakely; Raoul Bhaneja; Jefferson Brown; Brandon Firla; Andrea McCulloch; Rosemary Dunsmore; Gordon Pinsent
- Cinematography: Tami Reiker
- Edited by: Tristen Bakker
- Music by: Keegan Jessamy; Bryce Mitchell
- Production companies: Pocket Change Films; Shoes Full of Feet
- Distributed by: Mongrel Media
- Release dates: October 6, 2009 (VIFF); March 5, 2010 (Canada)
- Running time: 90 minutes
- Country: Canada
- Language: English

At Home by Myself...With You is a 2009 Canadian comedy-drama film directed by Kris Booth, in his directorial debut, and is co-written with Ramona Barckert. It premiered at the 2009 Vancouver Film Festival. Kristin Booth won Best Performance by a Female in the film category at the 11th Canadian Comedy Awards.

== Premise ==
Romy has agoraphobia and believes if she steps outside that bad things will happen to the people she cares about. She's also terrified of lobsters, storms, kissing and opening boxes. She works as a travel agent remotely from her home. When a handsome man, with quirks of his own, for example being nameless, moves in as her neighbor, she falls for him.

== Cast ==
- Kristin Booth as Romy
- Aaron Abrams as Guy
- Shauna MacDonald as Erin
- Ryan Blakely as Sam
- Raoul Bhaneja as Waylon
- Jefferson Brown as Dentist's Brother
- Brandon Firla as Dentist
- Andrea McCulloch as Amy
- Rosemary Dunsmore as Bessie
- Gordon Pinsent as Narrator (voice)

== Production ==
Director Kris Booth raised the film's $42,000 budget from his own savings and donations from friends and strangers. After viewing a rough draft, Telefilm Canada took over production costs. Film production took two years, and it was shot over the course of 17 days, including two insert days.

== Reception ==
Film critic Barry Hertz wrote in his review for the National Post that the film is "more engaging more often than not, thanks to the performances of Booth and Abrams". He said that both actors "radiate enough charm to brighten the lamest of caricatures", and Abrams in particular, "creates a rakishly fun romantic interest".

In his review for The Globe and Mail, Liam Lacey wrote that "most romantic comedies struggle to balance pathos and comedy and don't meet the challenge entirely successfully". He said this film is no exception, complaining the writing has "Romy acting like a child, shrinking away from her neighbour's advances because 'he might have cooties'", and that the "script doesn't really get to its emotional core - the battle between security and growth - until the third act ... all the interim juvenile nonsense about treasure hunts, stuffed animals and lobsters is a big cutesy-poo exercise in distraction".

Film critic Liz Braun wrote in the Toronto Sun that the film "is a bright little confection that highlights the talents of both leads ... the writing is sparkly and the story is sweet; the film feels a bit slight overall, but the performances are so engaging that you won't much mind". In his review for the Toronto Star, Jason Anderson wrote that the "people on screen often seem like walking, talking collections of cute quirks rather than characters worth caring about ... yet the film does have its charms, largely thanks to its cast ... Aaron Abrams, Shauna MacDonald and Rosemary Dunsmore make the most of their parts".

== See also ==
- List of Canadian films of 2009
