= Listen to the City =

- Directed by: Ron Mann
- Screenplay by: Bill Schroder; Ron Mann
- Produced by: Ron Mann
- Starring: P.J. Soles; Michael Glassbourg; Sandy Horne; Jim Carroll
- Cinematography: Rene Ohashi
- Edited by: Elaine Foreman
- Music by: Gordon Deppe
- Release date: 1984
- Running time: 78 minutes
- Country: Canada
- Language: English

Listen to the City is a 1984 Canadian drama film directed by Ron Mann. Normally a documentary filmmaker, this is Mann's only fictional feature. The film stars P.J. Soles, Jim Carroll, Sandy Horne, and Michael Glassbourg. Featured in small or cameo roles are such notable Canadian counter-culture figures as poets Barrie Phillip Nichol and Barry Callaghan, politician Jack Layton, playwright Sky Gilbert, and radio broadcasters Pete Griffin and Geets Romo.

== Plot ==
Hupar (Jim Carroll) wakes up from a 20-year coma. Disoriented, he soon meets Arete (Sandy Horne), a young poet, and Sophia (P.J. Soles), a TV newswoman. Together, the three team up to expose corporate crime in a crumbling cityscape of the very near future.

== Cast ==
- P. J. Soles as Sophia
- Michael Glassbourg as Goodman
- Sandy Horne as Arete
- Jim Carroll as Hupar
- Barry Callaghan as Father
- Sky Gilbert as Shadow
- Pete Griffen as Mayor
- Geets Romo as Mayor’s assistant
- Peter Wintonick as Peter
- Bill Lord as Preston Sturrock
- Gigi Guthrie as Christie Hines
- Mary Hawkins as White
- Réal Andrews as Green
- Gary Augustynek as Black
- Jack Layton as patient
- Barrie Phillip Nichol as labour department head

== Production ==
Bill Schroder and Ron Mann wrote the script in six days and filmed it in twelve days. The film cost $150,000. Scenes with Martin Sheen were shot, but he was edited out of the film.

== Soundtrack ==
Listen to the City

Soundtrack album by Gordon Deppe; Spoons
- Released: 1984
- Studios: Power Station (New York, New York)
- Genres: Film score; new wave; synth-pop
- Length: 29:45
- Label: Ready
- Producers: Gordon Deppe; Nile Rodgers

Spoons chronology
Talkback (1983)	Listen to the City (1984)	Bridges Over Borders (1986)

The Listen to the City soundtrack album consists of the primarily instrumental score for the film, and was written, produced and performed by Gordon Deppe of the band Spoons. On two tracks, Deppe is joined by Sandy Horne as co-performer and co-composer; Horne co-starred in the film and was also a member of Spoons. Rob Preuss, also of Spoons, assists on these two tracks.

The album's final two tracks are actually performed by (and credited to) the Spoons as a whole. These songs, "Tell No Lies" and "Romantic Traffic", were both issued as singles in Canada; both charted and are among the band's most well-known hits in that country.

=== Track listing ===
No.	Title	Writer(s)	Performer(s)	Length
1.	"Theme for a City (Opening Credits)"	Deppe	Gordon Deppe	2:46
2.	"Something Not Quite Right"	Deppe	Gordon Deppe	4:00
3.	"Sundown"	Deppe; Horne	Gordon Deppe; Sandy Horne	4:29
4.	"Then as Now"	Deppe	Gordon Deppe	1:16
5.	"A New World"	Deppe	Gordon Deppe	1:30
6.	"Take Me Walking"	Deppe; Horne	Gordon Deppe; Sandy Horne	3:44
7.	"Walk into the Wind"	Deppe	Gordon Deppe	2:08
8.	"Until Tomorrow (Closing Credits)"	Deppe	Gordon Deppe	2:07
9.	"Romantic Traffic"	Deppe; Preuss	Spoons	3:34
10.	"Tell No Lies"	Deppe	Spoons	4:11
Total length:				29:45

=== Personnel ===
==== Tracks 1–8 ====
- Gordon Deppe — all instruments, except
- Sandy Horne — vocals, bass guitar on 3 and 6
- Rob Preuss — keyboards and rhythm machine on 3 and 6

===== Production personnel, tracks 1–8 =====
- Produced by Gordon Deppe
- Engineered by Rick Lightheart and Brian Hewson
- Recorded and mixed at Sound Path Studios, Oakville, Ontario

==== Tracks 9–10 ====
- Gordon Deppe — vocals, guitar
- Sandy Horne — bass, vocals
- Rob Preuss — electronic keyboards and piano
- Derrick Ross — drums

===== Production personnel, tracks 9–10 =====
- Nile Rodgers — producer
- Jason Corsaro — engineer
- Recorded at the Power Station, New York City

== Release ==
Spectrafilm, the film's distribution company, went out of business before its release. Listen to the City did not receive a theatrical release and Mann had $70,000 in debt due to its financial failure.

== Works cited ==
- Posner, Michael (1993). Canadian Dreams: The Making and Marketing of Independent Films. Canadian Independent Film Caucus. ISBN 1550541145.
