= Unexpected Guest at a Cancelled Party =

Compilation album by Spoons
- Released: June 2007
- Recorded: 1982–1985
- Genre: New wave, synthpop
- Length: 43:59
- Label: Spoons Music
- Producer: The Spoons

Spoons chronology
Collectible Spoons (1994)	Unexpected Guest at a Cancelled Party (2007)	Static in Transmission (2011)

Professional ratings
Review scores
Source	Rating
On The Scene	4/5 stars

Unexpected Guest at a Cancelled Party is a compilation album of unreleased material by the Canadian 80s new wave band Spoons. Named after the B-side to their "Talk Back" single, it was released independently by Spoons member Gordon Deppe in June 2007.

== Background and writing ==
According to Gordon Deppe the album "covers the time roughly between 1983 and 1985", and was the band's first release of studio material since their 1988 Vertigo Tango album.

Deppe related the origin of the material: "Most of these songs were recorded after "Romantic Traffic" and "Tell No Lies", in a tiny, hidden away studio in Oakville, Ontario. We were about to embark on a whole new chapter in our musical lives that would leave these old ideas forgotten, to slowly weather over time and eventually fade into the earth."

A few of these songs were played live including "In the Hands of Money" (circa 1984) which can be seen on the Spoons' DVD Spoons Live in Concert.

== Track listing ==
1. "Love Drum" – 4:16
2. "Show & Tell" – 3:33
3. "Unpremeditated Love" – 3:47
4. "2,000 Years" – 4:21
5. "World in Motion" – 4:16
6. "Bending" – 3:32
7. "Young English Gentleman" – 3:35
8. "In the Hands of Money" – 3:43
9. "No Promises" – 4:39
10. "Spaces" – 3:12
11. "Love Can Be a Stranger" – 3:31
12. "Ciao" – 1:34

== Personnel ==
- Gordon Deppe - vocals, guitar
- Sandy Horne - vocals, bass
- Rob Preuss - keyboards
- Derrick Ross - drums
