= Foolproof (film) =

- Theatrical release poster
- Directed by: William Phillips
- Written by: William Phillips
- Produced by: Colin Brunton; Bill House; Seaton McLean
- Starring: Ryan Reynolds; Kristin Booth; Joris Jarsky; David Suchet
- Cinematography: Derek Rogers
- Edited by: Susan Shipton
- Music by: Jim McGrath
- Distributed by: Alliance Atlantis Releasing
- Release date: October 3, 2003
- Running time: 93 minutes
- Country: Canada
- Language: English
- Budget: CAD$7.8 million

Foolproof is a 2003 Canadian heist film directed by William Phillips and starring Ryan Reynolds, David Suchet, Kristin Booth, Joris Jarsky, and James Allodi.

== Plot ==
Kevin, Sam, and Rob play a game that they call "Foolproof", in which they create working plans to infiltrate and burgle various targets. They do not actually execute these heists, preferring to simply simulate them using necessary technical and physical abilities to carry out the tasks required. They adhere to some rules, such as using identical equipment and infrastructure as the target and using no firearms of any kind.

A famous criminal, Leo Gillette, breaks into Sam's apartment, steals the trio's plans for a jewelry warehouse heist, and accomplishes it. He then uses their plans to blackmail the group into designing and executing a plan to steal $20 million in bonds from a bank. They reluctantly accept and begin planning a new heist.

Tension escalates within the group as Rob admires and befriends Leo, Sam uses her physical prowess to test Leo's limits and is occasionally punished for it, and Kevin tries to protect the trio and minimize their exposure. Leo rewards Rob by paying him alone for the trio's involuntary help in the successful jewelry heist. Kevin and Sam burgle Leo's restaurant wine cellar to obtain the plans being used to blackmail them, but Rob informs Leo who catches them in the act. Leo has his goons watch them all.

With the trio's careful planning, the bank heist proceeds smoothly and they obtain the bonds, replacing them with forgeries to avoid detection. However, as they attempt to leave, Leo and Rob betray Kevin and Sam, leaving them to fall with a crashing elevator car. Leo and Rob go to retrieve the bonds, and in a standoff a fallen Sam shoots Rob and Leo shoots Sam. Convinced that he is the last one alive, Leo escapes with the bonds.

Leo returns to his restaurant to find it surrounded by firefighters and police due to a fire caused by a device Kevin had left in the wine cellar. The police question Leo and confront him with the strongbox in which he had kept both the jewelry heist plans and the diamonds obtained. They open it and instead find plans for the bank heist, and a quick search reveals his possession of the stolen bonds and a recently fired handgun loaded with blanks. Dressed as a firefighter, Kevin slips through the cordon and into a car with Sam and Rob. Kevin shows that he has successfully collected the plans used to blackmail them and the diamonds. They drive away while discussing their future.

== Cast ==
- Ryan Reynolds as Kevin
- Kristin Booth as Sam
- Joris Jarsky as Rob
- David Hewlett as Lawrence Yeager
- James Allodi as Detective Mason
- David Suchet as Leo Gillette

== Production ==
The film was filmed in Toronto, Ontario, Canada, and produced by Alliance Atlantis Communications and Ego Film Arts and released theatrically on October 3, 2003, by Odeon Films in Canada and Momentum Pictures of the United Kingdom.

In Canada, it was released in 204 theatres, more than any other movie in the past. Under Telefilm Canada rules stating the film producers must have a good script and firm distribution deals to get a grant of more than C$1 million, Telefilm granted Foolproof C$3.4 million. The entire budget was C$7.8 million.

== Reception ==
Chris Parry of eFilmCritic gave it 3 out of 5 stars and wrote: "The practice of Canadian companies and funding bodies unquestioningly funding any and all projects that Atom Egoyan signs his name to must end immediately. Not that this, his first foray into action thrillers, is necessarily the worst film of all time. In fact, it's actually quite enjoyable in parts. But the money blown on it could have funded eighteen smaller films that actually had a shot at the box office - or one close to this one, only which had the one secret ingredient needed to make a profit... an actual star."

== Home media ==
The film was released on DVD in March 2004, including behind-the-scenes and special effects features, the theatrical trailer and outtakes. The package also contained a CD of the soundtrack, with songs performed by The Crystal Method, The Dandy Warhols, Sam Roberts and Pilate.

In 2020, mobile phone company Mint Mobile, in which Ryan Reynolds had an ownership stake, made the film available to view for free, through a print from the ad-supported streaming service FilmRise, on the website mintmobileplus.com, purported as being part of a new streaming service launched by the company (a joke on the various streaming services, such as Disney+, HBO Max, and Apple TV+, launching or increasing in popularity that year, even having a logo stylized after the first service); the joke was that the film was the only program on the "service", being shown with different thumbnails to make it appear as if it were different films.
