= Treed Murray =

2001 film by William Phillips

- Theatrical release poster
- Directed by: William Phillips
- Written by: William Phillips
- Produced by: Paula Devonshire; Helen Du Toit; Marguerite Pigott
- Starring: David Hewlett
- Cinematography: John Holosko
- Music by: Jim McGrath; Joel Feeney; Marc Jordan
- Release date: 30 November 2001
- Running time: 90 minutes
- Country: Canada
- Language: English

Treed Murray, also known as Get Down, is a 2001 Canadian drama thriller film written and directed by William Phillips and starring David Hewlett. It won two Genie Awards (Overall Sound and Sound Editing), and was nominated for three more (Motion Picture, Direction, and Music - Original Song).

== Synopsis ==
During a routine walk home through a park, advertising agency executive Murray (David Hewlett) gets lost after fleeing a beggar and runs into Carter (Kevin Duhaney), who demands his wallet. After a struggle, Murray strikes Carter in the face with his briefcase and proceeds to walk away. A small gang of punk teenagers, of which Carter is a member, emerges from the bushes. Murray flees and the gang begins to chase him. Fearing a beating, Murray climbs a tree to evade capture. Despite him throwing down his wallet and watch to them, the gang decides to wait for him to come down.

An attempt to call to other people for help fails, while Murray's mobile phone is in his briefcase at the base of the tree. As night falls, the gang tries various tactics to force Murray out of the tree but find themselves accidentally providing him with weapons and hostages. Murray, in turn, tries to undermine the gang's cohesion and confidence. The night continues and, as events unfold and through dialogue, both Murray and the gang learn more about human life and each other.

== Cast ==
Actor	Role
David Hewlett	Murray
Aaron Ashmore	Dwayne
Clé Bennett	Shark
Kevin Duhaney	Carter
Jessica Greco	Kelly
Carter Hayden	KC
Julian Richings	Homeless Man
