= Romantic Traffic =

Single by Spoons

from the album Listen to the City
- B-side: "Theme for a City"
- Released: 1984
- Studio: Power Station (New York City)
- Genre: New wave
- Length: 3:29-3:35
- Label: Ready
- Songwriters: Gordon Deppe; Rob Preuss
- Producer: Nile Rodgers

Spoons singles chronology
"Tell No Lies" (1984)	"Romantic Traffic" (1984)	"Bridges Over Borders" (1986)

Music video
- "Romantic Traffic" on YouTube

"Romantic Traffic" is a 1984 single by the Canadian new wave band Spoons. It is from the soundtrack album Listen to the City from the movie of the same name. It was released in both 7" and 12" formats: on the former, it was the A-side (with "Theme for a City" on the B-side), while on the latter it was the B-side (with "Tell No Lies" on the A-side).

== Background ==
Originally, the opening bass riff was meant to be played on piano, but due to Nile Rodgers' – who had also produced the band's third studio album Talkback (1983) – suggestion, it was changed. The production was also "punched up" through the use of the Aubrey Juke Brass Section and the Simms Brothers' backing vocals – who had also played for the likes of David Bowie.

The "doot-doots" in the chorus were added in by accident. Originally, Gordon Deppe lacked actual lyrics to add to those portions of the song. While recording, he decided to sing the "doot-doots" as a kind of filler while he tried to formulate words, but he could not come up with anything that fit. This turned out to be a positive outcome, as Rodgers found the "doot-doots" to be captivating enough to keep them in the song. Despite being made for a movie soundtrack, "Romantic Traffic" is one of the Spoons' signature songs in part because of that choice in the chorus.

The music video was filmed in the Toronto subway system at the Bloor and Sheppard stations. Directed by Robert Fresco with one handheld camera, the video was completely off-the-cuff with no script. Regardless of this, Sandy Horne says that it was, "the easiest video we ever did [and] our most effective".

== Formats ==
7" — Ready Records / SR 482 Canada

1. "Romantic Traffic" – 3:29
2. "Theme for a City" – 2:46

12" — Ready Records / SRB 048 Canada

1. "Tell No Lies" – 6:11
2. "Romantic Traffic" – 3:29
3. "White Lies" – 2:47

== Chart positions ==
Chart (1985)	Peak position
Canadian RPM Top Singles	55

== Personnel ==
Spoons

- Gordon Deppe — vocals and lead guitar
- Sandy Horne — bass guitar
- Derrick Ross — drums
- Rob Preuss — keyboards

Production

- Nile Rodgers — producer
- Jason Corsaro — engineer
