= Waiting for Summer =

- Directed by: Senthil Vinu
- Written by: Senthil Vinu
- Produced by: Krzysztof Pietroszek; Senthil Vinu; Executive Producers: Bala Shagrithaya; Senthil Vinu
- Starring: Caleb Verzyden; Virginia Leigh
- Release date: March 30, 2012
- Running time: 89 minutes
- Country: Canada
- Language: English

Waiting for Summer is a 2012 Canadian drama film directed by Senthil Vinu and starring Caleb Verzyden and Virginia Leigh. It was produced by Krzysztof Pietroszek. The film was released on March 30, 2012, at the Canadian Film Fest in Toronto, Canada and won the 2012 Film North Best Feature Award at the Film North – Huntsville International Film Festival.

== Cast ==
- Caleb Verzyden as Zach
- Virginia Leigh as Chantal
