= Nova Heart =

Single by Spoons

from the album Arias & Symphonies
- Released: May 10, 1982
- Genre: Techno-pop
- Length: 3:56 / 3:59 (7″); 5:46 (album); 6:42 / 6:47 (12″)
- Label: Ready Records
- Songwriter: Gordon Deppe
- Producer: John Punter

Spoons singles chronology
"After the Institution" (1980)	"Nova Heart" (1982)	"Arias & Symphonies" (1982)

"Nova Heart" is a song by the Canadian new wave band Spoons. It was released in May 1982 as the first single from their 1982 album Arias & Symphonies. It was their first song to appear on the Canadian singles chart.

Spoons vocalist Gord Deppe was inspired to write “Nova Heart” after seeing an Orchestral Manoeuvres in the Dark concert at Bannister's in Hamilton, Ontario. Deppe borrowed an electric piano from keyboardist Rob Preuss to write the song.

Following the success of the initial 7″ single version of "Nova Heart" (#40 Canada), an extended 12″ single was subsequently released. The B-side, "Symmetry," which did not appear on the Arias & Symphonies album, was a dance single, and while it did not get much airplay, it got significant play in clubs.

Nova Heart was re-released as a 30th Anniversary Edition CD on March 26, 2012. In addition to the "Single version" and the 12 inch Extended Mix of the song, the CD also has 2 new remixes made by the band itself, a demo made in 1981 and a "Live" version of the song recorded at Barrymore's club in Ottawa, Ontario in 1982. This is a limited edition CD.

Nova Heart was covered by Canadian Electro-goth band Johnny Hollow and fellow Canadian new wave band Strange Advance

The album cover photos were taken at the CN Tower in Toronto, Ontario by Peter Noble.

== Track listing ==
7″ - Ready Records / SR 201X Canada

1. "Nova Heart" (3:56)
2. "Symmetry" (3:59)

12″ - Ready Records / SRBH 020 Canada

1. "Nova Heart" (6:42)
2. "Symmetry" (6:47)

== Chart positions ==
Chart (1982)	Peak position
Canadian RPM Top Singles	40
