= Ray Gardner =

Ray Gardner may refer to:

- Ray Gardner (All My Children)
- Ray Gardner (baseball) (1901–1968), baseball player
- Ray Dempsey Gardner (1922–1951), American serial killer
