= John Albert Taylor =

American murderer

- Utah State Prison mug shot
- Born: June 6, 1959; Ogden, Utah, U.S.
- Died: January 26, 1996 (aged 36); Utah State Prison, Utah, U.S.
- Status: Executed at Utah State Prison
- Convictions: Carrying a concealed weapon, burglary – 1977, Florida; Sexual assault, aggravated murder – December 1989, Utah
- Penalty: Death by firing squad

John Albert Taylor (June 6, 1959 – January 26, 1996) was an American who was convicted of burglary and carrying a concealed weapon in the state of Florida, and sexual assault and murder in the state of Utah. Taylor's own sister tipped off police in June 1989 after 11-year-old Charla King was found raped and strangled to death in Washington Terrace, Utah. His fingerprints were found at the crime scene, which was located in an apartment complex where he had been staying. In December 1989, Taylor was sentenced to death and placed on death row at Utah State Prison.

Taylor gave up appealing his sentence after his request for retrial was rejected by the Utah Supreme Court, though he continued to maintain his innocence. He became the second person to be executed by firing squad in the United States (after Gary Gilmore) since the death penalty was reinstated in 1976. Taylor said he chose this method of execution to embarrass the state of Utah. On January 26, 1996, the day of Taylor's execution, legislation was introduced in the Utah House of Representatives to eliminate the firing squad.

== Background ==
John Albert Taylor was born in Ogden, Utah to Albert and Gaylene Taylor, who separated during his infancy. He moved several times during his youth, including a move to Colorado at the age of nine, when he was told that his father had died. According to Taylor, he was raised in Florida, where he was abused as a child and became involved in drugs by his teens. Taylor stated that he did not get along with his stepfather, a Vietnam veteran, or his mother: "But she could never control me. My mother had a lot of animosity toward my father. They alienated me for a long time. I was the whipping post." At the age of 13, he stabbed his stepfather. According to court records, he repeatedly raped and sodomized his sister Laurie during his teens, and raped, and sodomized other young girls, and was committed to a sex offender program. In 1974, Taylor moved back to Ogden to live with his grandmother, but soon returned to Florida.

In 1977, Taylor was arrested in Florida and charged with burglary and carrying a concealed weapon after he was caught with a stolen gun. He was convicted and imprisoned until December 1981, when he was released on parole. In March 1982, he was arrested in Fort Lauderdale, Florida for armed burglary, armed robbery, and sexual assault. He had been characterized by medical personnel at the age of 17 as "a remorseless pedophile." He was acquitted of the charges in September 1982, but was sentenced to 15 additional years in prison for parole violations. In 1989, Taylor was released and departed for Utah to be with his sisters and biological father, who he discovered was still alive.

From all I saw, my father was a good man. But while I was growing up, I was told so many stories about him that I've come to learn were all lies. My father was being painted a villain when he really wasn't one. I've come to learn that the real villain was my mother.

— John Albert Taylor, March 7, 1992

== Murder of Charla King ==
At around 3:20 p.m. on June 23, 1989, Sherron King returned from work to her apartment in Washington Terrace, Utah to find the body of her daughter Charla in the bedroom with a nightgown wrapped around her head and panties stuffed in her mouth. After calling the police, she was instructed to perform cardiopulmonary resuscitation and discovered that Charla had been strangled to death with a telephone cord. Charla's foster grandmother Bertha Poster stated that she had dropped Charla off at the apartment at about 1:30 p.m. after visiting the mall. Charla had been planning to celebrate her 12th birthday at an amusement park the next day. Prosecutors believe that Taylor entered the house with intent on sexually molesting the girl. When she caught him in the house, prosecutors believe, he chased her into the bedroom, and placed her underwear in her mouth. He raped her, placed a nightgown over her head, and strangled her to death.

=== Arrest ===
On June 25, a tipster, who was later revealed to be Taylor's sister Laurie Galli, contacted Washington Terrace Police officer Marcia Gathercole with information connected to the murder. Taylor's fingerprints were found on a telephone in the King residence and matched to records provided by authorities in Fort Lauderdale. He was arrested at about 9 p.m. on June 28 at the home of his half-sister/incestuous lover Tresa Taylor in Ogden, Utah and charged with first-degree burglary, first-degree child rape, and first-degree murder the next morning. Taylor had arrived from Florida four days before the murder and had been staying with another sister in the same apartment complex.

I remember telling my father that whoever they arrested for this crime was history, and that was before my arrest.

— John Albert Taylor, January 1996

Sherron King moved out of the apartment complex on June 28. She was upset that the neighbors who came forward as witnesses did nothing when they heard her daughter screaming.

=== Murder trial ===
On November 27, 1989, the trial commenced under District Judge David Roth after Taylor waived his right to a jury. Taylor testified on his own behalf that he only entered the apartment in the act of burglary while no one was home, leaving his fingerprints on the phone when he found money underneath it. Weber County deputy attorney William Daines stated that Taylor previously denied being in the apartment and that two witnesses placed him at the scene at the time of the crime. Prison inmate Mike Gallegos testified that he had a brief conversation in which Taylor told him that he killed a girl by accident, and masturbated on the corpse. Duane Moyes and James Gaskill of the Weber State College crime laboratory testified that the person who cut the telephone cord with a knife and wrapped it around the neck of the victim was likely the same as the one who left behind fingerprints on the phone. Lab director Gaskill stated that the prints, three of which were matched to fingers on Taylor's left hand, were the only evidence that placed Taylor at the crime scene. Gaskill said there was no evidence in the apartment to indicate a burglary took place or that any other person was connected to the murder.

On December 5, 1989, Judge Roth found Taylor guilty of the first-degree child rape and first-degree murder of Charla Nicole King. During the penalty phase of Taylor's trial, his half-sister Leslie Beale traveled from Florida to testify about his harsh treatment under his stepfather and the three years that Taylor spent in a sex offender program at a Florida mental institution. On December 19, Taylor became the first convict in 40 years to be sent to death row by a Weber County court. Roth said that the facts of the case outweighed any mitigating circumstances. Taylor's father Albert attended most of his son's court proceedings until he died of heart failure on October 8, 1990. Taylor said he was not permitted to attend his father's funeral.

=== Appeals ===
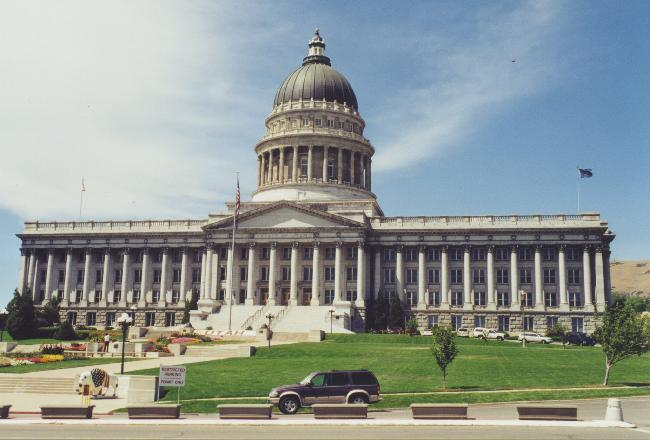
Taylor's appeals were rejected by the Utah Supreme Court.

The case was automatically appealed to the Utah Supreme Court, which upheld Taylor's conviction and sentence in October 1991. Taylor's execution was initially scheduled for January 15, 1992. The date was rescheduled to June 24 when Taylor's attorney Martin Gravis requested to withdraw from the case. On June 17, Judge Roth granted a stay of execution after Taylor's new defense attorney Ron Yengich requested more time to prepare an appeal. At issue was a new 1992 law in Utah that established the sentence of life imprisonment without parole.

While incarcerated at Utah State Prison, Taylor kept busy in an effort to overcome his claustrophobia and boredom. He earned his high school diploma and studied to be a paralegal until his educational grant money ran out.

In October 1995, Taylor decided to end further appeals after the Utah Supreme Court rejected his argument that his legal counsel was ineffective. He fired defense attorney Ed Brass, stating: "If I don't fight for my appeal, I don't need an attorney." Taylor said he was prepared to die partly because of his failing health, including an enlarged heart, bleeding ulcers, and swollen legs and feet.

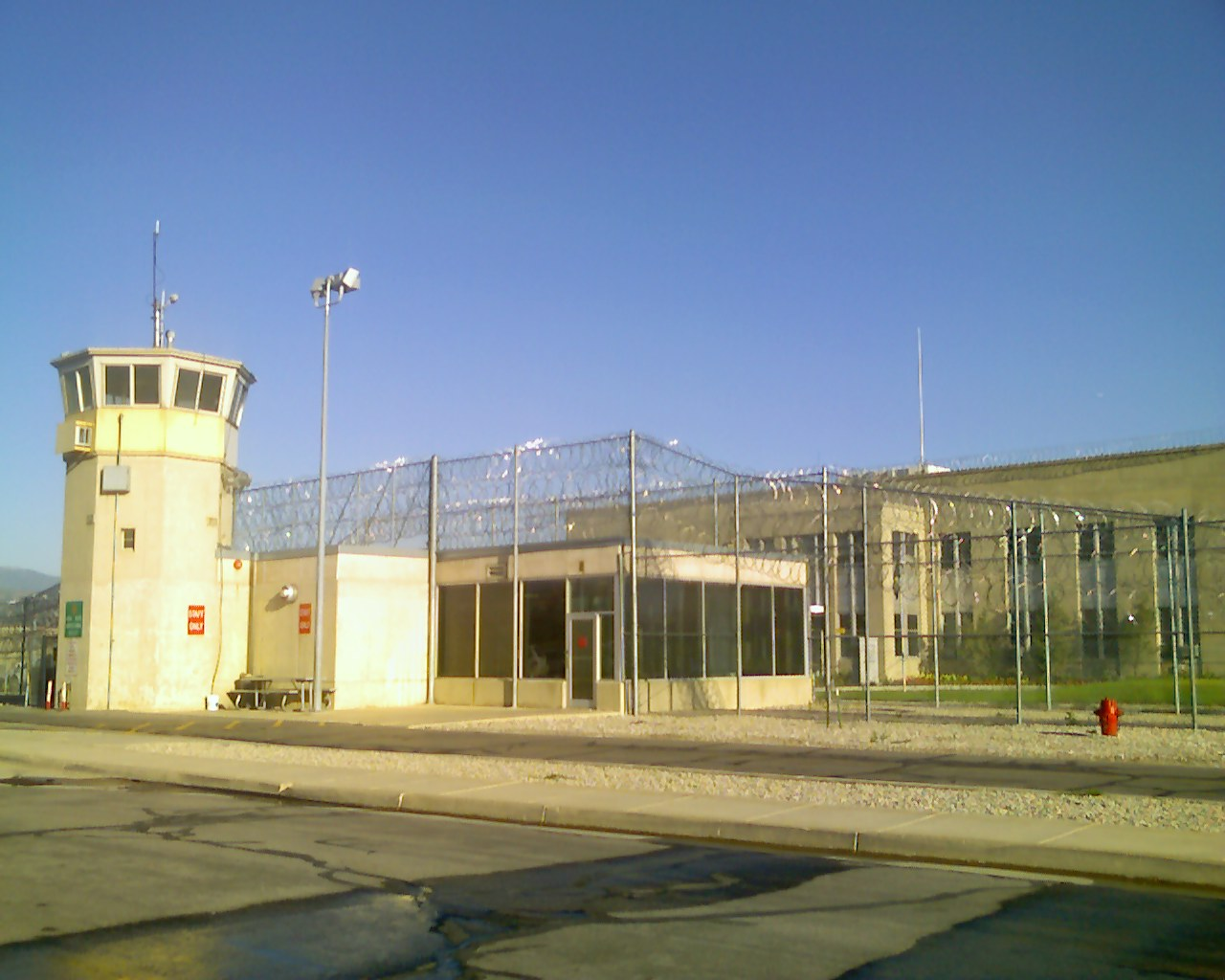
Taylor earned his high school diploma and was studying to be a paralegal at Utah State Prison.

I don't want to die alone in my cell.

— John Albert Taylor, December 1995

Judge Roth ordered Taylor to choose a method of execution. Taylor chose to be executed by firing squad to make the process more difficult for Utah state officials. In an interview with the Deseret News, he stated: "I didn't commit the murder, and I'm not going to submit to letting them kill me on that table." Regarding the option of lethal injection, Taylor said, "I don't want to go flipping around like a fish out of water on that table."

To be strapped to a table and injected full of drugs leaves me with a feeling of helplessness because I am innocent of the crime for which I was convicted of. Anyway, if my execution is carried out, it will be a murder. Granted, it may be legally sanctioned, but, nonetheless, murder it will be, and the firing squad is my way of showing that point [...] and [I chose firing squad also] because of the cost and the inconvenience it will cause the state, because they are not really prepared for an execution by firing squad.

— John Albert Taylor, January 21, 1992

== Execution ==
For his last meal Taylor ordered a large Ambassador pizza with thin crust, onions, mushrooms, hot peppers, sausage, pepperoni, ham and extra cheese. He also asked for a Coke. When Taylor ordered a last meal of pizzas "with everything," some law enforcement veterans recalled that the same request was made by Barton Kay Kirkham, the last man to be hanged in Utah. Like Taylor, Kirkham had selected his method of execution with the goal of inconveniencing the state. On January 25, 1996, Taylor spent his final evening sharing his pizza with his uncle Gordon Lee while joined by former attorney Ed Brass and Catholic priest Reyes Rodriguez, who administered the Last Rites. Taylor, whose stomach had been doing "flip-flops" earlier in the day, requested antacid medication and declined deputy warden Wally Schulsen's offer of more pizza, soda, and coffee. He gave his glasses to warden Hank Galetka and said, "There is no need for them." Taylor refused an offer to be sedated before his execution, but was allowed his first cigarette in six years.

Five police officers, who volunteered to carry out the execution, were each paid $300. The shooters used identical Winchester Model 94 rifles. One prison official selected each rifle at random from a table and handed them to another prison official sitting in a small room, out of sight. The second prison official would then load the rifle, and return it to the table. Four of the rifles were loaded with live ammunition. One chosen at random was loaded with a wax bullet so that none of the officers would be certain that they fired a deadly shot. The non-lethal cartridge was tested to ensure that the report and recoil were difficult to distinguish from those of a real cartridge.

=== Media coverage ===
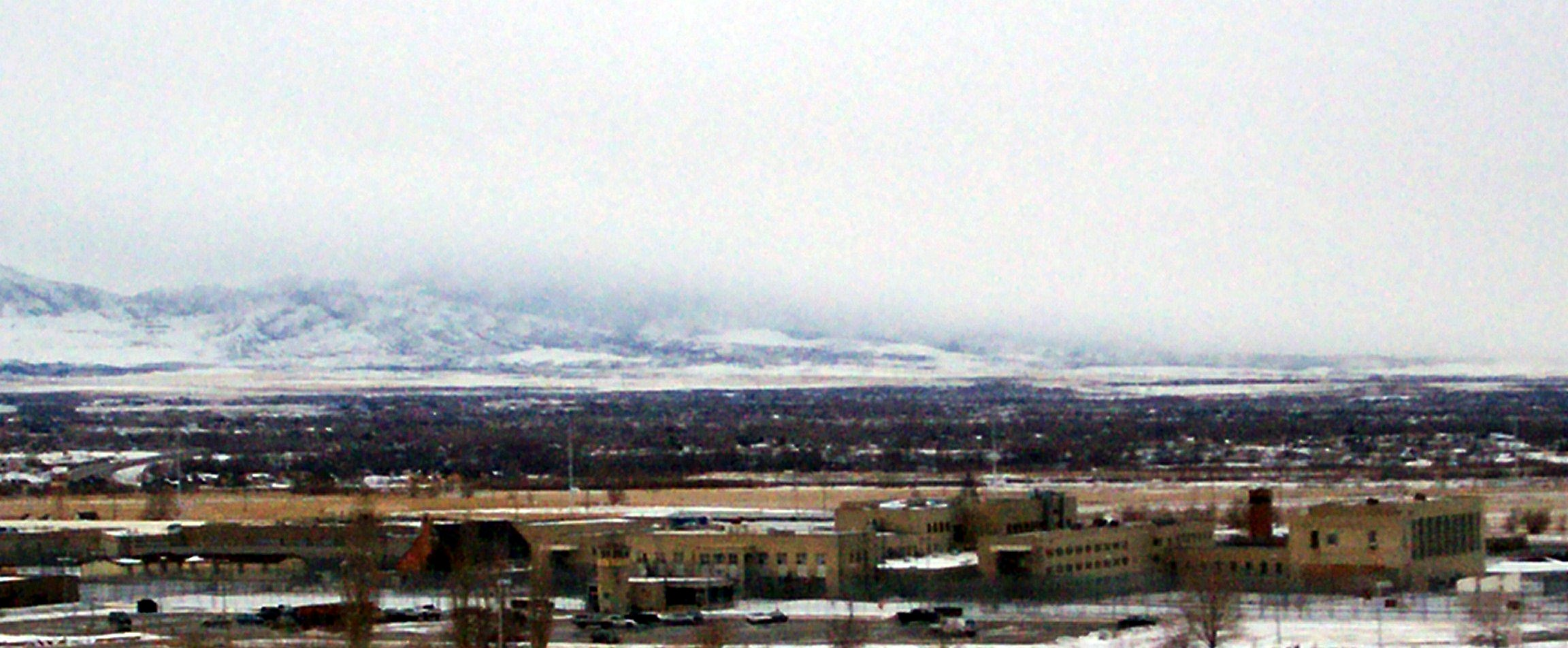
Taylor was executed by firing squad in a warehouse at Utah State Prison at 12:03 a.m. on January 26, 1996.

Over 168 news and television crews from around the world were on hand to report the execution, which was set up inside a warehouse at Utah State Prison in Draper. Nine media witnesses were allowed to record the actual event. Actor and activist Mike Farrell appeared as a commentator for the American Civil Liberties Union in opposition to the death penalty. Elliott King, the uncle of Charla King, was the sole member of the victim's family to arrive as a witness and expressed that he had no sympathy for Taylor. Sister Helen Prejean, the author of Dead Man Walking, wrote Taylor a letter that was delivered right before his execution.

=== Death ===
Shortly before midnight, Taylor was led into the execution chamber and strapped to a chair 17 feet away from the shooters with a hood covering his head. Multiple bright lights covered Taylor. Sandbags were arranged behind him to prevent any ricochets. The captain walked down the aisle, tapping each shooter on the shoulder to check to see if they were ready. At 12:03 a.m. Mountain Standard Time on January 26, 1996, every shooter fired at the count of five and the white cloth target on Taylor's chest flew off. His chest moved upward and his left hand tightened into a fist. His grip gradually loosened and his head fell back. A doctor checked Taylor's neck for a pulse and cut two holes in his hood to check for a pupillary light reflex. Taylor was declared dead at 00:07 a.m. and became the 49th person to be executed in the state of Utah since 1852.

I would like to say for my family and my friends — as the poem was written, 'Remember me, but let me go.'

— Final statement of John Albert Taylor, 12:01 a.m., January 26, 1996

=== Aftermath ===
After an autopsy, Taylor's remains were cremated and shipped to his uncle Gordon Lee in Oregon. The Salt Lake County Sheriff's Office said it would specify homicide as the cause of death on Taylor's death certificate because the execution met the state's definition of "death by another's hand." A commemorative coin was created to recognize the staff who had participated in the execution. Eight hours after Taylor's execution, Utah State Representative Sheryl Allen first introduced a bill to eliminate the firing squad, and later succeeded in passing HB180, which removed the right of the condemned to choose their method of execution after February 2004.

If they choose the firing squad, it's one last magnificent manipulation of the system to bring attention to themselves... It's time for Utah to do away with the firing squad.

— Sheryl Allen, Utah House of Representatives, January 21, 2004

== See also ==
- List of people executed in Utah
- List of people executed in the United States in 1996
- List of serial rapists

Executions by firing squad in the United States
Preceded by Gary Mark Gilmore – Utah January 17, 1977	John Albert Taylor – Utah; January 26, 1996	Succeeded by Ronnie Lee Gardner – Utah June 18, 2010
Executions carried out in Utah
Preceded by William D. Andrews July 30, 1992	John Albert Taylor; January 26, 1996	Succeeded by Joseph Mitchell Parsons October 15, 1999
Executions carried out in the United States
Preceded by Billy Bailey – Delaware January 25, 1996	John Albert Taylor – Utah; January 26, 1996	Succeeded by William Henry Flamer – Delaware January 30, 1996
