= List of people executed in Utah =

The following is a list of people executed by the U.S. state of Utah.

== List of people executed in Utah since 1976 ==
No.	Name	Race	Age	Sex	Date of execution	County	Method	Victim(s)	Governor
1	Gary Mark Gilmore (Note: Gilmore was the first criminal to be executed in both Utah and the United States since the 1976 resumption of capital punishment in the nation.)	White	36	M	January 17, 1977	Utah	Firing squad	Bennie Bushnell (Note: Also killed Max David Jensen, but was executed for murdering Bushnell.)	Scott M. Matheson
2	Dale Selby Pierre	Black	34	M	August 28, 1987	Weber (Note: Was tried and convicted in Davis County, on a change of venue.)	Lethal injection	Stanley Orren Walker, Michelle Ansley, and Carol Elaine Naisbitt	Norman Bangerter
3	Arthur Gary Bishop	White	35	M	June 10, 1988	Salt Lake	Lethal injection	5 murder victims (Note: The five murder victims were: Alonzo Daniels, Claude Kimley Peterson, Danny Davis, Troy Ward, and Graeme Cunningham.)	Norman Bangerter
4	William D. Andrews	Black	37	M	July 30, 1992	Weber (Note: William D. Andrews was tried and convicted in Davis County, on a change of venue.)	Lethal injection	Stanley Orren Walker, Michelle Ansley, and Carol Elaine Naisbitt	Norman Bangerter
5	John Albert Taylor	White	36	M	January 26, 1996	Weber	Firing squad	Charla Nicole King	Mike Leavitt
6	Joseph Mitchell Parsons	White	35	M	October 15, 1999	Iron	Lethal injection	Richard Lynn Ernest	Mike Leavitt
7	Ronnie Lee Gardner	White	49	M	June 18, 2010 (Note: This was the last execution held at the Utah State Prison in Draper.)	Salt Lake	Firing squad	Michael Burdell (Note: Also killed Melvyn John Otterstrom, but was executed for murdering Burdell.)	Gary Herbert
8	Taberon Dave Honie	Native American	48	M	August 8, 2024 (Note: This was the first execution held at the Utah State Correctional Facility in Salt Lake City.)	Iron	Lethal injection	Claudia Marie Benn	Spencer Cox

=== Demographics ===
Race
White	5	63%
Black	2	25%
Native American	1	13%
Age
30–39	6	75%
40–49	2	25%
Sex
Male	8	100%
Date of execution
1976–1979	1	13%
1980–1989	2	25%
1990–1999	3	38%
2000–2009	0	0%
2010–2019	1	13%
2020–2029	1	13%
Method
Lethal injection	5	63%
Firing squad	3	38%
Governor (Party)
Cal Rampton (D)	0	0%
Scott M. Matheson (D)	1	13%
Norman Bangerter (R)	3	38%
Mike Leavitt (R)	2	25%
Olene Walker (R)	0	0%
Jon Huntsman Jr. (R)	0	0%
Gary Herbert (R)	1	13%
Spencer Cox (R)	1	13%
Total	8	100%

== List of people executed in Utah from 1854 to 1960 ==
Name	Race	Age	Date of execution	County	Method	Crime	Victim(s)	Governor
Long Hair	Native American		September 15, 1854	Utah	Hanging	Murder	William F. and Warren D. Weeks, white	Brigham Young
Antelope	Native American		September 15, 1854	Utah	Hanging	Murder	William F. and Warren D. Weeks, white	Brigham Young
Thomas H. Ferguson	White		October 28, 1859	Salt Lake	Hanging	Murder	Alexander Carpenter, white	Alfred Cumming
William Cockcroft	White		September 21, 1861	Salt Lake	Firing squad	Murder	Robert Brown, white	Vacant
Jason R. Luce	White		January 12, 1864	Salt Lake	Firing squad	Murder	Samuel R. Burton, white	James Duane Doty
Robert Sutton	White		October 10, 1866	Tooele	Firing squad	Murder	Frederick White, white	Charles Durkee
Chauncey W. Millard	White	18	January 29, 1869	Utah	Firing squad	Murder-Robbery	Harlan P. Swett, white (Note: Possible serial killer, claimed to have committed five previous murders.)	Vacant
John Doyle Lee	White	64	March 23, 1877	Salt Lake	Firing squad	Murder	120-140 people, white (Note: Mountain Meadows Massacre.)	George W. Emery
Wallace Wilkerson	White	45	May 16, 1879	Utah	Firing squad	Murder	William Baxter, white	George W. Emery
Frederick Hopt	White		August 11, 1887 (Note: First execution at Sugar House Prison.)	Summit	Firing squad	Murder-Robbery	John Franklin Turner, white (deputy)	Caleb Walton West
Enoch Davis	White		September 14, 1894	Utah	Firing squad	Murder	Female, white (wife)	Caleb Walton West
Charles H. Thiede	White	36	August 7, 1896	Salt Lake	Hanging	Murder	Mary Frank Thiede, white (wife)	Heber Manning Wells
Patrick Coughlin	White	22	December 15, 1896	Rich	Firing squad	Murder	Thomas A. Stagg and N. E. Dawes, white (sheriff and special deputy)	Heber Manning Wells
Peter Mortensen	White	39	November 20, 1903 (Note: Second execution at Sugar House Prison. No further local executions took place after this.)	Salt Lake	Firing squad	Murder	James R. Hay, white	Heber Manning Wells
Frank Rose	White	30	April 22, 1904	Salt Lake	Firing squad	Murder	Maud Eliza Rose, white (wife)	Heber Manning Wells
J. J. Morris	White	44	April 30, 1912	Salt Lake	Hanging	Murder-Robbery	Joseph W. Axtell, white	William Spry
Julius C. E. Szirmay	White	23	May 22, 1912	Salt Lake	Firing squad	Murder-Burglary	Thomas Carrick, 14, white	William Spry
Harry Thorne	White	24	September 26, 1912	Salt Lake	Firing squad	Murder-Robbery	George Fussell, white	William Spry
Thomas Riley	White	27	October 24, 1912	Salt Lake	Firing squad	Murder-Robbery	George Fussell, white	William Spry
Frank Romeo	White	28	February 20, 1913	Carbon	Firing squad	Murder-Robbery	Albert Victor Jenkins, white	William Spry
Joe Hill	White	33	November 19, 1915	Salt Lake	Firing squad	Murder-Robbery	John G. and Arling Morrison, white	William Spry
Howard DeWeese	White	33	May 24, 1918	Salt Lake	Firing squad	Murder	Fanny DeWeese, white (wife)	Simon Bamberger
John Borich	White	33	December 19, 1919	Tooele	Firing squad	Murder	Velma Adkins, white	Simon Bamberger
Steve Maslich	White	36	January 20, 1922	Salt Lake	Firing squad	Murder	Marco Laus, white	Charles R. Mabey
Nick Oblizalo	White	33	June 9, 1922	Salt Lake	Firing squad	Murder	Marco Laus, white	Charles R. Mabey
George H. Gardner	White	37	August 31, 1923	Salt Lake	Firing squad	Murder	Gordon Stuart, white (deputy sheriff)	Charles R. Mabey
Omer R. Woods	White	48	January 18, 1924	Salt Lake	Firing squad	Murder	Maretta Woods, white (wife)	Charles R. Mabey
George Allen	White	20	February 20, 1925	Salt Lake	Firing squad	Murder	Nephi P. Pierce, white (Salt Lake City police sergeant)	George Dern
Pedro Cano	Hispanic	28	May 15, 1925	Summit	Firing squad	Murder	June St. Clair, white	George Dern
Ralph W. Seyboldt	White	26	January 15, 1926	Salt Lake	Firing squad	Murder	David H. Crowther, white (Salt Lake City patrolman)	George Dern
Edward McGowan	Black	51	February 5, 1926	Carbon	Firing squad	Murder	Bob Blevins, black (Note: Also raped his wife and their 16- and 12-year-old adopted daughters.)	George Dern
Delbert Green	White	27	July 10, 1936	Davis	Firing squad	Murder	Three people, white (Note: His 18-year-old wife Anna, his 38-year-old foster father/uncle James Green, and his mother-in-law/aunt.)	Henry H. Blood
John W. Deering	White	40	October 31, 1938	Salt Lake	Firing squad	Murder-Robbery	Oliver R. Meredith Jr., 52, white	Henry H. Blood
Donald Lawton Condit	White	26	July 30, 1942	Iron	Firing squad	Murder-Robbery	Harold A. Thorne, white	Herbert B. Maw
Robert Walter Avery	White	35	February 4, 1943	Weber	Firing squad	Murder	Hoyt L. Gates, white (Ogden detective)	Herbert B. Maw
Austin Cox Jr.	White	39	June 19, 1944	Weber	Firing squad	Murder	Lewis V. Trueman, white (judge) (Note: Also murdered Sam Nelson, Bessie Hooks, Jane Stauffer, and Mrs. T. Burton earlier that same day.)	Herbert B. Maw
James Joseph Roedl	White	28	July 13, 1945	Uintah	Firing squad	Murder-Robbery	Abigail Agnes Williams, white	Herbert B. Maw
Elisio J. Mares Jr.	Hispanic	25	September 10, 1951 (Note: First execution at Utah State Prison.)	Summit	Firing squad	Murder-Robbery	Jack D. Stallings, white	J. Bracken Lee
Ray Dempsey Gardner	White	29	September 29, 1951	Weber	Firing squad	Murder-Rape	Shirley Jean Gretzinger, 17, white (Note: Serial killer, also murdered two others in North Dakota and Montana.)	J. Bracken Lee
Don Jesse Neal	White	36	July 1, 1955	Salt Lake	Firing squad	Murder	Owen T. Farley, white (police sergeant)	J. Bracken Lee
Melvin Leroy Sullivan	White	26	May 11, 1956	Iron	Firing squad	Murder-Robbery	Howard Manzione, 21, white	J. Bracken Lee
Vernon Alfred Braasch	White	28	May 11, 1956	Iron	Firing squad	Murder-Robbery	Howard Manzione, 21, white	J. Bracken Lee
Barton Kay Kirkham	White	22	June 7, 1958	Salt Lake	Hanging	Murder-Robbery	David Avon Frame, 50, white (Note: Also murdered 37-year-old Ruth Holmes Webster during the same crime.)	George Dewey Clyde
James W. Rodgers	White	49	March 30, 1960	San Juan	Firing squad	Murder	Charles Merrifield, white	George Dewey Clyde

== See also ==
- Capital punishment in Utah
- Capital punishment in the United States
