= Joseph Mitchell Parsons =

American murderer (1964-1999)

- Utah State Prison mug shot
- Born: July 22, 1964; New York City, U.S.
- Died: October 15, 1999 (aged 35); Utah State Prison, Utah, U.S.
- Other names: "Rainbow Warrior" "Yogi"
- Occupation: Shoe salesman
- Status: Executed by lethal injection
- Conviction: Capital murder
- Penalty: Death (February 18, 1988)

Joseph Mitchell "Yogi" Parsons (July 22, 1964 – October 15, 1999) was an American who was executed for the August 1987 murder of Richard Lynn Ernest. Parsons hitched a ride with Ernest in California and stabbed him to death at a remote rest area in Utah. After assuming Ernest's identity, Parsons continued to insist that he was Ernest when he was later arrested.

Parsons, who called himself the "Rainbow Warrior", pleaded guilty to the murder. During his sentencing hearing, Parsons said that he killed Ernest to fend off a homosexual advance, but was unable to present any evidence to support this claim in his defense. The jury sentenced him to death. In 1999, Parsons stated that "it's time to move on" and dropped his appeals, allowing his execution to proceed. Discussion was later raised whether "Rainbow Warrior" was a reference to homosexuality or Parsons' favorite NASCAR driver, Jeff Gordon.

Parsons chose to die by lethal injection, and he shunned attention, describing himself as "Utah's forgotten inmate". His 1999 execution at Utah State Prison was the first to be carried out in a new chamber designed for both lethal injections and firing squads.

== Background ==
Joseph Mitchell Parsons was born on July 22, 1964, to Joseph Michael and Marie Parsons in New York City. For the first five years of Mitchell's life, his father was incarcerated. His parents worked odd jobs from sewing fuzzy dice to construction. Joseph Mitchell's half-sister Dinah said that his father beat him frequently until he wet himself. After Joseph Michael left the family, Marie took Joseph Mitchell and Dinah to Florida, where Marie met and married Lawrence Gordon. Dinah met a drug dealer nicknamed Yogi, who Parsons admired. Parsons later adopted the nickname and had "Yogi" tattooed onto his right arm.

After a year in Florida, Parsons was caught stealing cash from an apartment management office. He ended up with three burglary convictions during his four years in the state as a minor. He graduated from high school with a C average and sold shoes in a shopping mall. When Parsons' stepfather refused to buy him a motorcycle, Parsons took one for a test drive from a dealer in Fort Lauderdale and did not return. He went to New Jersey to see his biological father, but was rebuffed. Parsons' sister-in-law Theresa Gomez said, "He rejected him ... Who knows what went through his mind?" Parsons then rode the motorcycle west to Las Vegas, Nevada.

=== Imprisonment in Nevada ===
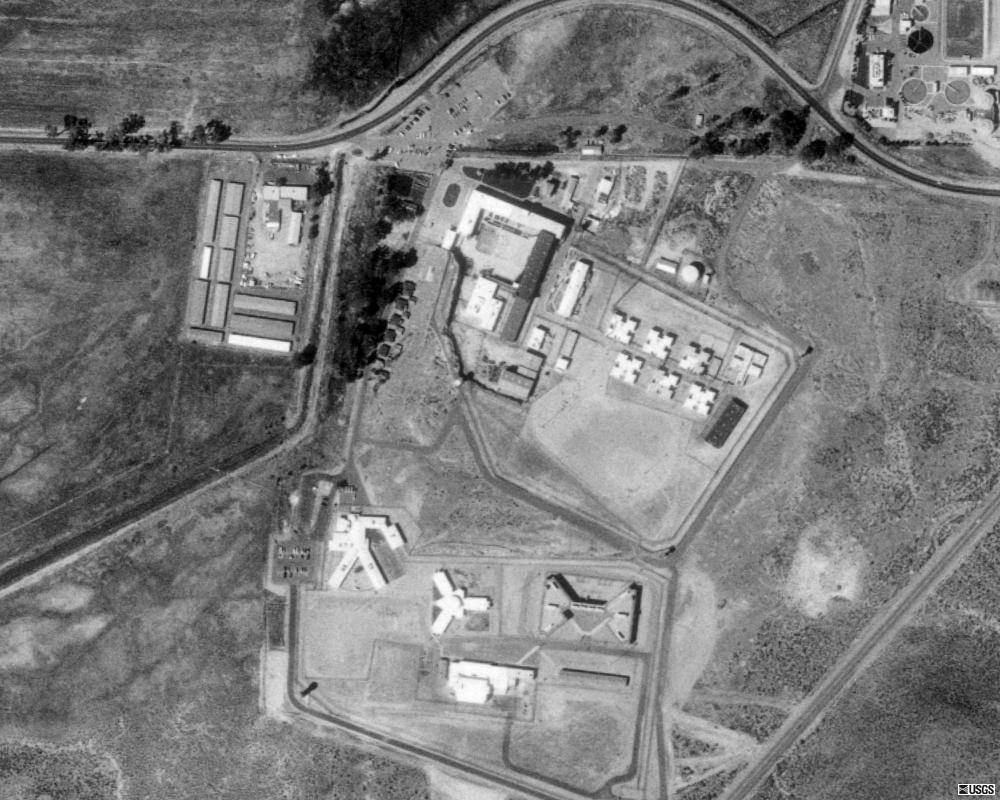
Parsons received no visitors during his five years at Nevada State Prison.

On the night of October 16 to 17, 1982, Parsons met David Wood in Las Vegas and they took a cab to the Strip in search of marijuana. Near the destination, Parsons pointed a .22-caliber revolver at the driver's neck to rob him. After stealing the driver's taxi, the two were caught in an alley and placed under citizen's arrest by Charles Conant and his brother-in-law Ronald Maske, who were both armed with guns. During trial, Parsons characterized himself as an orphan who stayed out of trouble and testified against Wood. The court did not have access to Parsons' juvenile record, and was unaware of his parents on the East Coast. Parsons later stated that he provided false testimony against Wood in a plea bargain for a lighter sentence. Wood was convicted and spent 13 years in prison. No visitors came to see Parsons during his five years at Nevada State Prison. In August 1987, Parsons was paroled to a halfway house in Reno. He walked out of the facility before his release date and fled on a stolen motorcycle.

== Murder of Richard Ernest ==
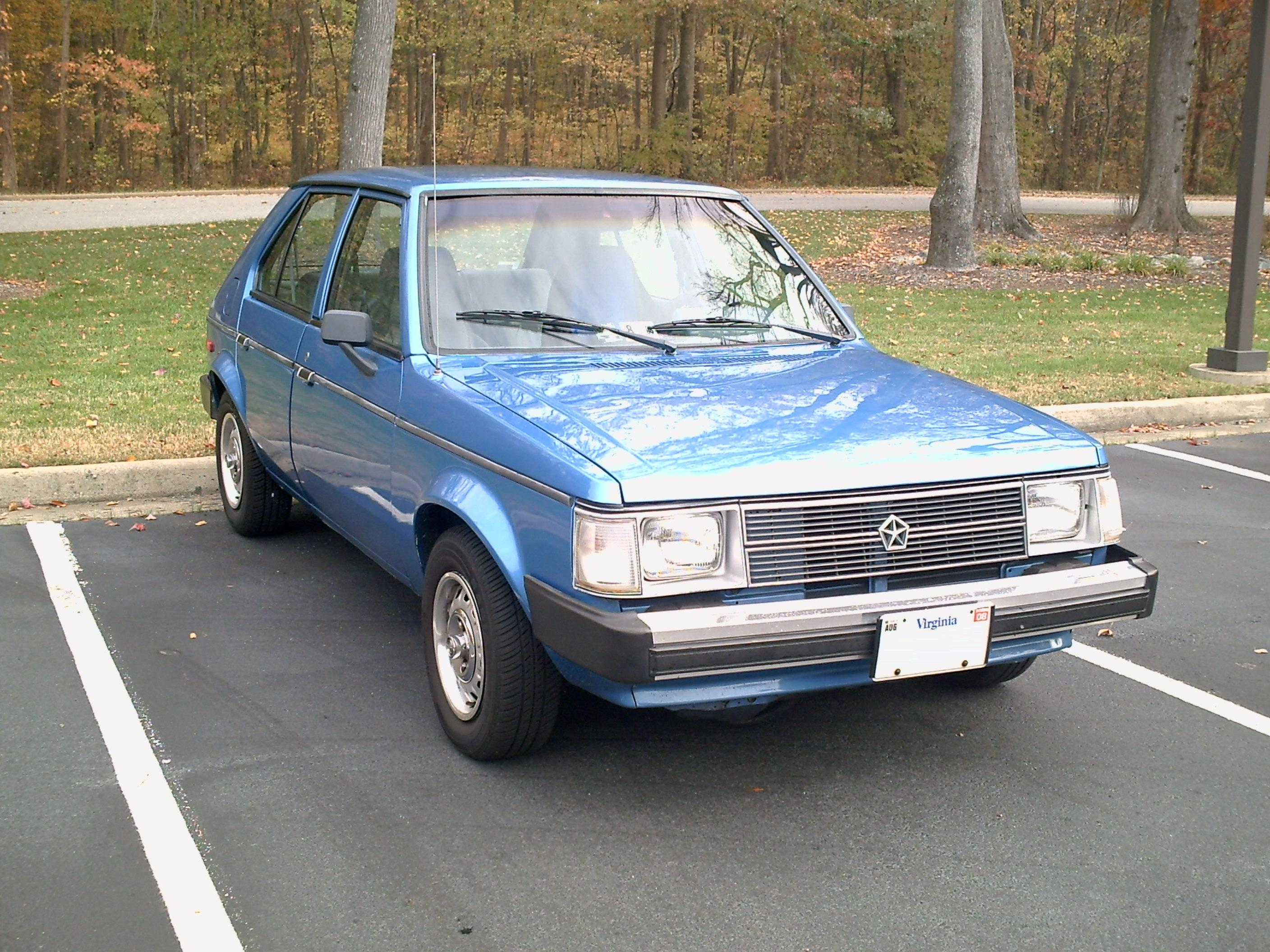
A Dodge Omni similar to the one driven by Ernest and stolen by Parsons.

On August 30, 1987, Parsons was hitchhiking along Interstate 15 near Barstow, California. He was picked up by 30-year-old Richard Lynn Ernest, a concrete laborer from Loma Linda, California, on his way to a construction job in Denver, Colorado. Ernest did not know that Parsons was a fugitive. At about 3 a.m. on August 31, Ernest was too tired to drive and stopped at the Lunt Park rest area near Cedar City, Utah, to get some sleep. Parsons stabbed Ernest to death and drove off in his blue Dodge Omni.

Ernest was murdered near Cedar City and Parsons was arrested near Salina in Utah.

At about 5 a.m., Parsons stopped at a Texaco service station 23 miles to the north. He was wearing Ernest's clothes and had assumed his identity. Parsons told the station attendant he needed to hose out red construction paint from the car's interior and offered to give him Ernest's construction tools. The attendant said that he observed Parsons throwing away clothing, books, posters and carpentry tools into a dumpster. Parsons asked the attendant about the distance to Denver and spoke of Ernest's 9-year-old son as his own. He purchased cigarettes and food with Ernest's MasterCard credit card before leaving. At 7:23 a.m., Parsons used the credit card to check into a Quality Inn at Richfield, Utah. He used the card again at about 10 a.m. to purchase seat covers and floor mats from Kmart to cover up the blood stains in the car. A clerk called the Richfield Police Department after Parsons attempted to purchase $300 worth of items at 12:34 p.m. and the credit card was found to be over its limit. The attendant back at the Texaco station called the Beaver County Sheriff's Office after discovering bloody items in the dumpster. Deputy Raymond Goodwin found Ernest's bank statement and Parsons' bloody clothes in the dumpster. After calling Ernest's wife Beverley, the officers concluded that the person who visited the service station was not Richard Ernest. At about 4:25 p.m. on August 31, a Utah Highway Patrol officer found Parsons sleeping in Ernest's car at the Red Creek rest area on Interstate 70, west of Salina, Utah. When Parsons was brought into the Richfield police station where the bloody clothes were gathered, he continued to insist that he was Ernest. When officers asked for his street address, Parsons asked for a lawyer. Sheriff Kenneth Yardley recalled that Parsons asked if he could keep his book to read.

On September 1, 1987, Ernest's body was discovered underneath a sleeping bag dumped on the east side of Interstate 15, about a mile north of the rest area where he had been killed. He had been stabbed nine times, including in the heart and throat.

=== Trial and sentencing ===
Iron County prosecutor Scott Burns stated that he had witnesses from three different states and crime scenes in three different counties. While awaiting trial in the county jail, Parsons became afflicted with a severe case of crab lice. Lieutenant Matt Yengich told investigators that Parsons likely contracted the lice from "some type of homosexual interaction".

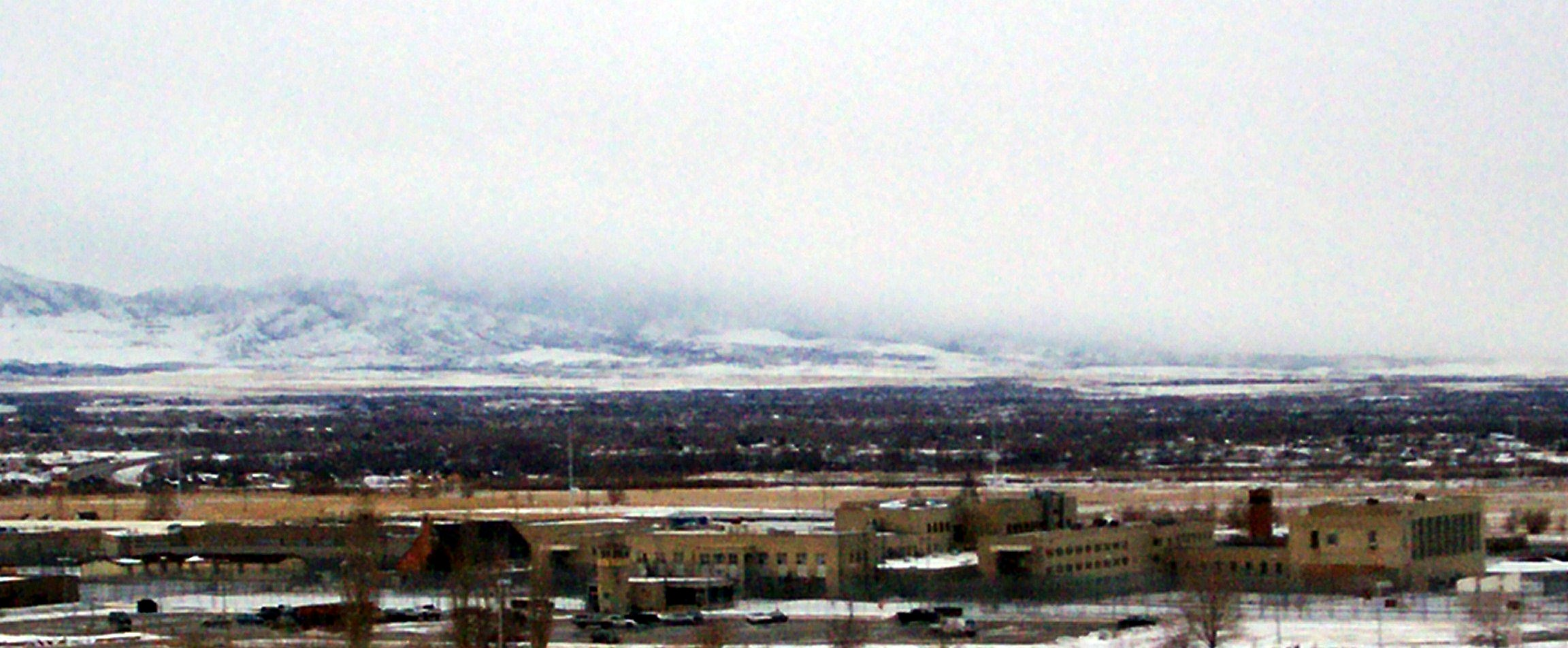
Utah State Prison, where Parsons was incarcerated until his execution.

During a court hearing for the murder, Parsons said, "Why are we doing this? I did it and everyone knows I did it." He pleaded guilty to motor vehicle theft, aggravated robbery and first-degree murder on September 18, 1987. Parsons' sentence was decided by a jury. Parsons said that he was defending himself with a four-inch knife when Ernest grabbed his leg and thought that Ernest's multiple wounds were "superficial." Parsons was unable to present evidence to corroborate his claim of a sexual advance by Ernest. Ernest's family and friends stated in court that Ernest was not gay or bisexual. Prosecution witnesses testified of Parsons' homosexual activity in jail. According to forensic psychiatrist David Tomb from the University of Utah, the descriptions of Parsons' sexual history indicated that he "may have been the one initiating the contact and became angry when [Ernest] turned him down." A medical examiner testified that Ernest appeared to have been stabbed while sleeping and was unable to defend himself. On February 18, 1988, a jury of six men and six women sentenced Parsons to death. He was sent to Utah State Prison.

=== Appeals ===
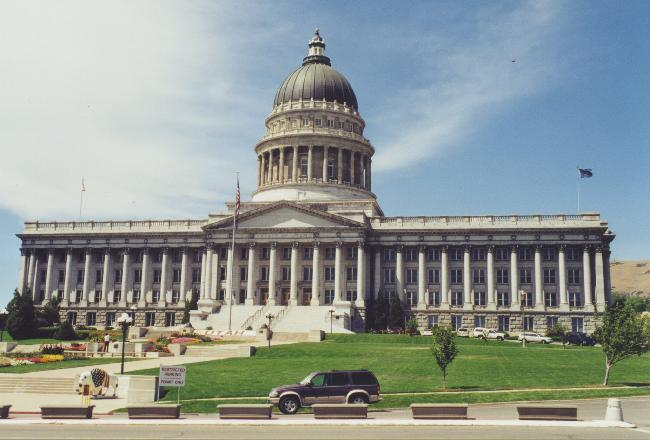
The Utah Supreme Court unanimously upheld Parsons' conviction.

Parsons filed an appeal disputing the constitutionality of his first-degree murder conviction with the Utah Supreme Court. His attorney argued that Parsons had already been convicted of another charge for the crime, making his murder conviction a violation of double jeopardy. On October 16, 1989, the court unanimously upheld the conviction and rejected his appeal on the grounds that Parsons should have raised that objection before he waived his right to a trial with his guilty plea. On March 5, 1990, District Judge J. Philip Eves rejected Parsons' complaint that he was denied his right to legal counsel while in prison and set his execution date for April 30, 1990. A new team of attorneys, which included Gregory Sanders and Ronald Yengich of the Rocky Mountain Defense Fund, took up Parsons' appeal that he had ineffective counsel during his trial. On January 12, 1994, the Utah Supreme Court rejected Parsons' petition for a writ of habeas corpus.

I'm not putting up or down what people did to get in here. But in a nutshell, no human contact is a form of torture.

— Joseph Mitchell Parsons, 1998

On July 6, 1999, Parsons abandoned a federal appeal of his sentence to the U.S. 10th Circuit Court of Appeals, stating that he preferred execution than waiting for years on death row. He complained that he was bored in prison, which he called "torture, plain and simple." The last visit Parsons had received was two hours with his mother in 1996. On August 16, 1999, District Judge Philip Eves signed a death warrant and scheduled Parsons' execution for October 15.

== Execution ==
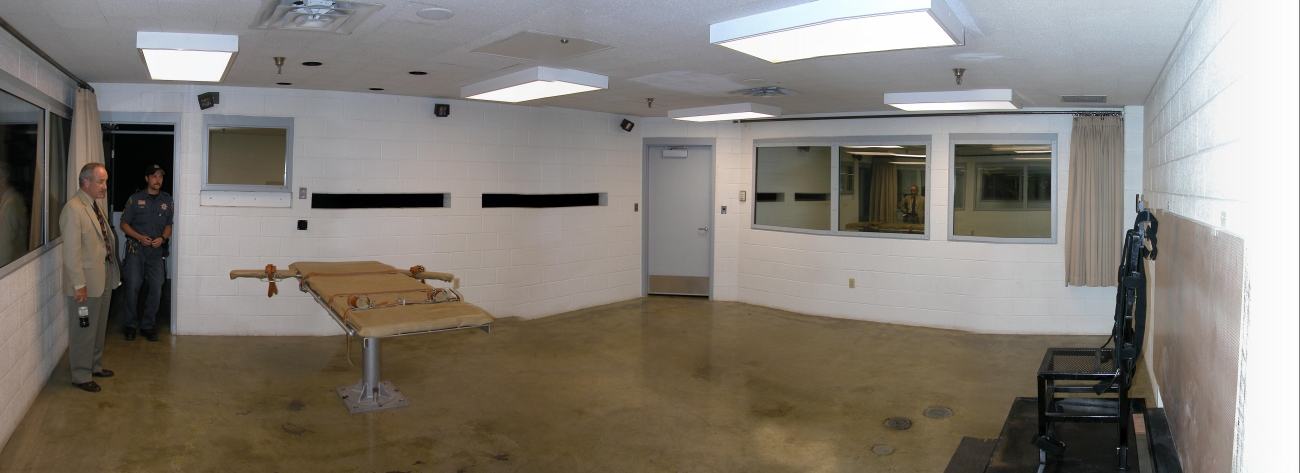
Parsons became the first inmate to be executed in a new chamber that was built in 1998 at Utah State Prison for use in either lethal injections or firing squads (two rifle slots visible in wall).

Parsons submitted a last request to walk under the stars, play basketball, and watch science-fiction films to prison warden Hank Galetka. Parsons also asked for his remains to be cremated and turned over to his family. Prison spokesperson Jack Ford said that the requests would be granted, but that Parsons would only be allowed to shoot some hoops in a fenced recreation area instead of a game of basketball in the prison gymnasium. The authorities were concerned that an injury could delay the execution. Parsons was permitted to walk outdoors at night to the place of execution.

On the evening before his execution, Parsons watched The Mummy and was visited in his death watch cell by his brother and his cousin. They shared his last meal of Burger King hamburgers, French fries, milkshakes, root beer, and chocolate chip ice cream. Parsons's attorney said he believed his client chose this meal because the Burger King slogan "Have it your way" was a reflection of him taking control of his life. After playing a game of Uno, he asked for the score of the 1999 American League Championship Series game. Parsons was permitted to call his mother Marie Gordon Rivera in Florida and his sister.

Parsons would become the first inmate to be executed in a new chamber that was built in 1998 at Utah State Prison for use in either firing squads or lethal injections. Two people, whose identities were withheld, were selected to administer individual injections, of which only one was lethal so that neither would know with certainty who executed the prisoner. The prison selected among paramedics or nurses because the American Medical Association prohibits licensed physicians from participating in executions. A mild sedative was delivered intravenously to calm Parsons before the deadly drugs were administered.

At 12:10 a.m. on October 15, 1999, Parsons was executed by lethal injection. Seven minutes later, a physician checked Parsons' stopped heartbeat with a stethoscope and pronounced him dead at 12:18 a.m. Parsons' last words were: "Love to my family and friends. And Woody, the rainbow warrior rules. Thank you."

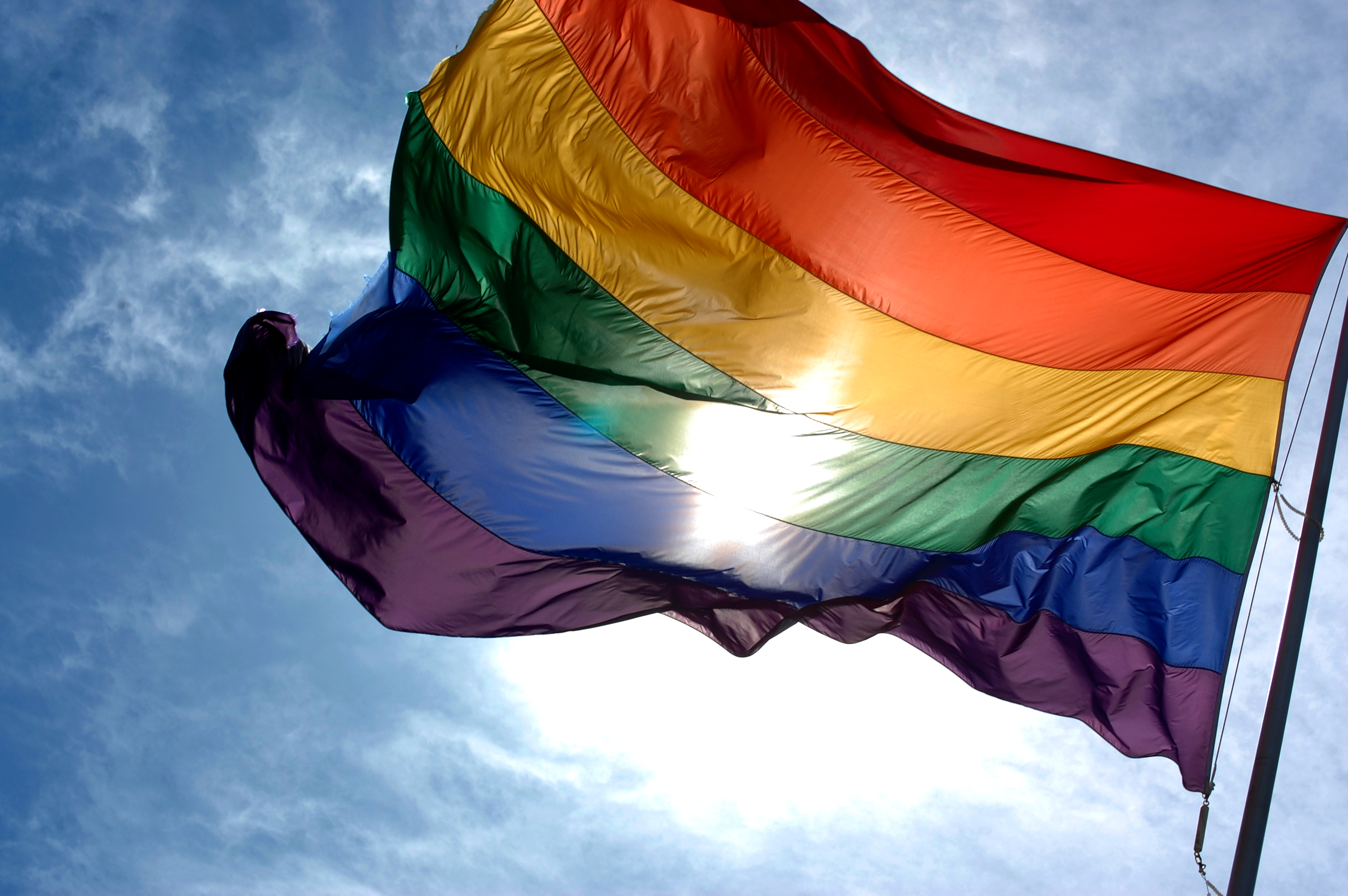
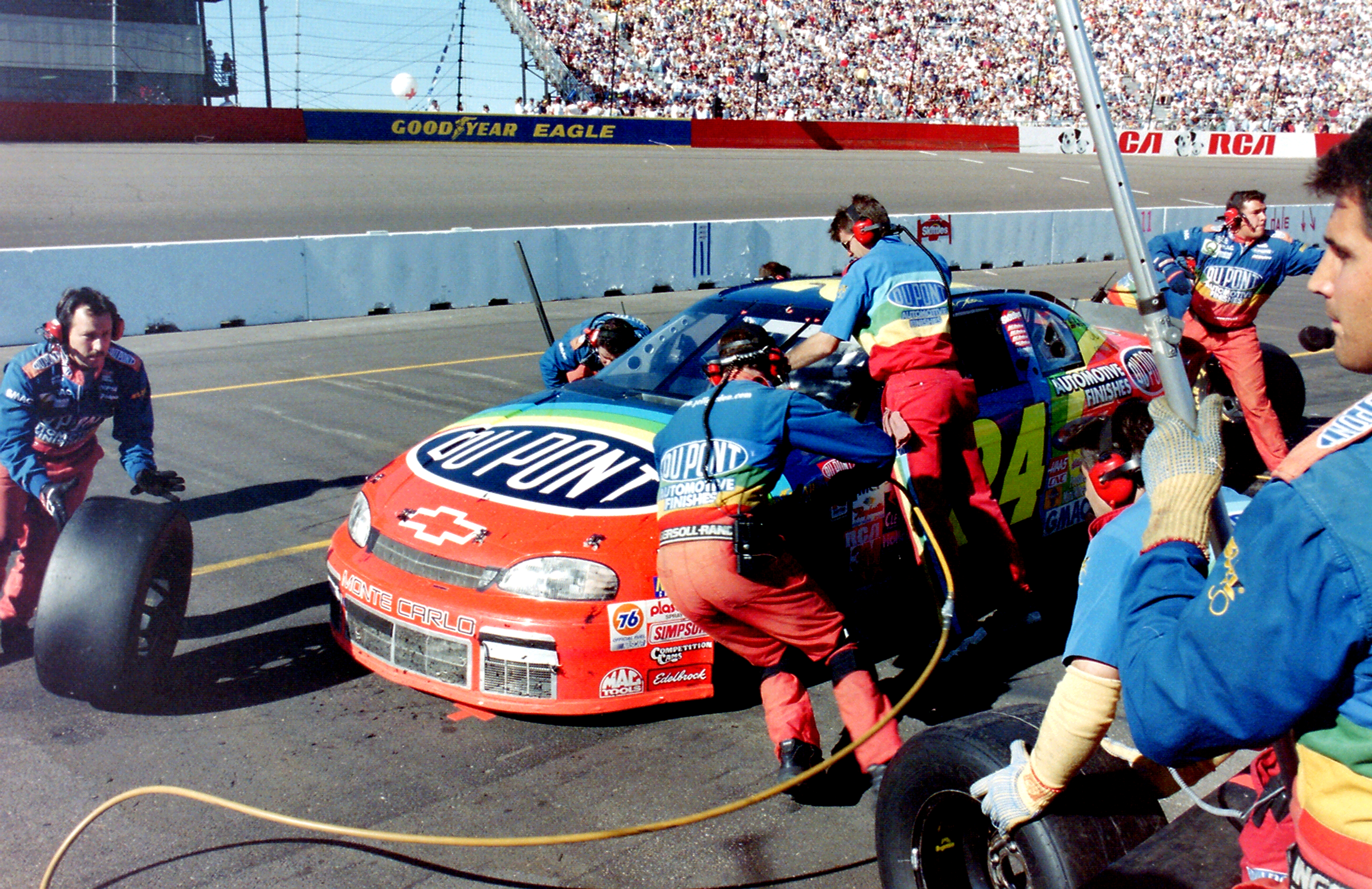
Parsons' mention of "rainbow warrior" raised discussion whether he was referring to homosexuality or Jeff Gordon's racing car.

Parsons had mentioned to attorney Greg Sanders a hatred of homosexuals, and after the execution, prison spokesperson Jack Ford said that "rainbow" may have been a homosexual reference to the victim. Fellow inmate Doug "Woody" Lovell stated "Rainbow Warrior" was instead referring to the colorful racing car of NASCAR champion Jeff Gordon.

=== Public reaction ===
Although Parsons requested that no one protest his death, the American Civil Liberties Union of Utah planned to organize a candlelight vigil in opposition to the execution. A group of around 50 people gathered outside the prison, mostly criminal justice students from Weber State University.

Unlike the previous execution of John Albert Taylor in 1996 (or Ronnie Lee Gardner that would follow in 2010), Parsons' execution attracted little media attention, with representatives from only 12 news organizations. Spokesperson Jack Ford called the level of interest virtually "nonexistent". Deputy attorney general Reed Richards presumed that the media apathy was a result of Parsons' choice of lethal injection, which was more broadly adopted in the United States than execution by firing squad, which was unique to Utah. Parsons' court-appointed attorney Greg Sanders said that his client called himself "Utah's forgotten inmate". Ernest's widow Beverley, who attended the execution, said that she was grateful for the lack of media scrutiny. Ernest's brother-in-law Jonathan Woods stated, "The world is less for having lost Richard. I hope, for Parsons' sake, the world will be less for having lost him, but that is not how I feel."

== See also ==
- Capital punishment in Utah
- Capital punishment in the United States
- Gay panic defense
- List of people executed in Utah
- List of people executed in the United States in 1999
- Volunteer (capital punishment)

Executions carried out in Utah
Preceded by John Albert Taylor January 26, 1996	Joseph Mitchell Parsons; October 15, 1999	Succeeded by Ronnie Lee Gardner June 18, 2010
Executions carried out in the United States
Preceded by Jerry Walter McFadden – Texas October 14, 1999	Joseph Mitchell Parsons – Utah; October 15, 1999	Succeeded by Jason Matthew Joseph – Florida October 19, 1999
