= John Deering (murderer) =

American murderer (1898–1938)

- Deering in 1938
- Born: John W. Deering; September 1898; Chicago, Illinois, U.S.
- Died: October 31, 1938 (aged 40); Sugar House Prison, Utah, U.S.
- Other name: Fred Davis
- Status: Executed by firing squad
- Conviction: First degree murder
- Penalty: Death

John W. Deering (September 1898 – October 31, 1938) was a convicted murderer who was the subject of an experiment to observe what would happen to the human heart during death by gunshot. Deering, an American facing execution by the state of Utah for the May 1938 murder of Oliver R. Meredith Jr., volunteered to have himself hooked up to an electrocardiogram while he was shot by a firing squad. The test indicated that his heart stopped in about 15 seconds of being hit, although other bodily functions, such as breathing, continued for a longer period of time.

== Background ==
Deering, who was raised in Chicago, Illinois, stated that he had a tumultuous childhood. Due to neglect, he was committed to a reformatory from the ages of thirteen to eighteen. Aspiring to join the military since his youth, Deering joined the United States Merchant Marine, but soon found himself incarcerated at San Quentin State Prison and Folsom State Prison, both in California.

When I was a kid raising hell everyone told me I'd end up on the gallows, so I thought I'd fool them. Also, there's an old saying I like: 'Live by the sword and die by the sword.'

— John Deering, October 1938

== Murder case ==
At around 9:00 pm on May 9, 1938, in Salt Lake City, 52-year-old real estate businessman Oliver R. Meredith Jr. was found shot and bleeding to death in his car. Meredith was taken to the nearby Madsen Apartments, where he lived with his wife, and died soon afterwards. A .38-caliber shell casing was found nearby and matched bullets retrieved from Meredith's body and also from a carjacking on May 7 of Maurice L. Howe and his wife, Lucie. The couple from Ogden identified Deering as the assailant who had also robbed them of $11 that night in Salt Lake City. Investigators found a .38 Colt automatic pistol that had been sold for $3 around May 12 to a pawnbroker near the Palace Casino in Reno, Nevada. The firearm was traced to Deering and was matched to the bullets from the crime scenes through ballistic fingerprinting.

=== Arrest and confession ===
Deering was captured in Hamtramck, Michigan, after his murder weapon was traced in Reno, Nevada.

On July 29, 1938, Deering was arrested in Hamtramck, Michigan, on suspicion of robbing the Hamtramck Finance Company. Having already spent 17 years behind bars, Deering did not want to face another 15 years imprisonment in Michigan. Hoping to be executed after hearing of his mother's death, Deering confessed to kidnapping the Howes and killing Meredith in Salt Lake City. Deering stated that he ran away after the shooting, and read about Meredith's death in a newspaper on the following day. His statement mentioned killing another man on a freight train and disposing of the body in a swamp, though that victim remained unidentified. Investigators later determined that Deering had been responsible for the shootings of two police officers in Salt Lake City and another in Portland, Oregon. Deering was also implicated in the murder of George L. Olson in Twin Falls, Idaho, and the torture-killing case of Hazel and Nancy Frome in Van Horn, Texas, but evidence was not found to connect him to those cases.

Deering was charged with the murder of Meredith on August 1, and was extradited to Utah on August 6. Right before being placed on a train back to Salt Lake City, Deering stated: "I don't mind dying. I see the futility of it all."

=== Trial and incarceration ===
Deering opposed the appointment of a defense attorney during his arraignment before Judge Herbert M. Schiller on August 11, 1938. His murder trial commenced on September 19 at the Third District Court under Judge Schiller while initially represented by attorney Edgar C. Jensen. Deering admitted his regret for shooting and killing Meredith to steal his automobile. He asked to be executed "without all the red tape and rigamarole of courts." The trial was marked by an outburst from Deering against the court for entering a mandatory plea of not guilty on his behalf. At one point, Deering was restrained by handcuffs after violently protesting the need to call the elderly widow of Meredith as a witness, despite his confessions. Judge Schiller noted Deering's "most extraordinary attitude" in refusing counsel and seeking his "constitutional right" to plead guilty to face the death penalty. The jury delivered a guilty verdict on September 21 after only an hour of deliberation; Deering thanked them and said, "you've done your duty."

The court later appointed public defender Clifford L. Ashton to represent Deering, who requested execution by firing squad over the other option of hanging at his sentencing hearing on September 24. As no requests for retrial nor commutation of sentence were pursued, his execution date was reached in only about three months from his arrest. Deering's sister Dorothy DeVaney wrote to him, hoping that he would "fight the case", but to no avail.

While awaiting his death sentence, Deering sought to be a model inmate and became popular with the prison guards. He publicly stated, "Build more athletic fields and gymnasiums ... Give children more play facilities to keep their minds on wholesome activities. Give them the chance to develop that I never had."

== Execution ==
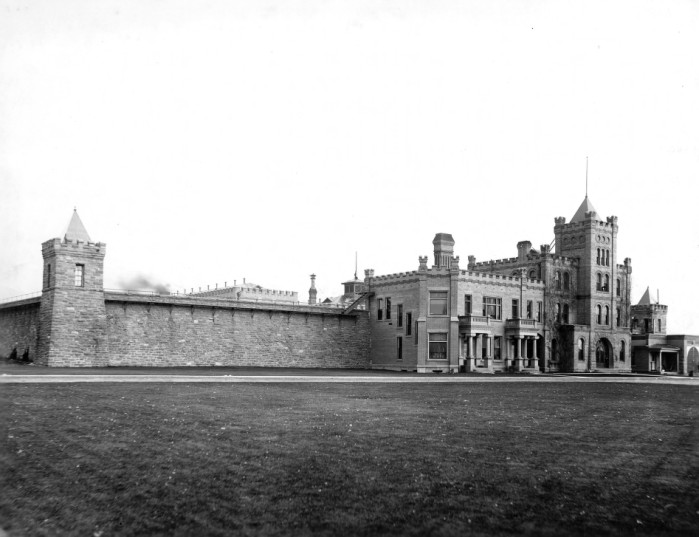
Deering was executed at Sugar House Prison on October 31, 1938.

During the night of October 30, 1938, Deering ate a last meal of pheasant, which he requested because he had never tasted it before. He was joined by his young attorney along with prison warden Owen Nebeker and chaplain Jim B. Moreton. During his meal, Deering said, "From here on, I've got to be an actor ... Nobody must know what goes on inside of me." He agreed to allow physicians to monitor his heart activity over the course of his execution, believed to be the first such experiment to be conducted.

At 6:30 AM on October 31, Deering was taken to a room at Sugar House Prison in the Sugar House neighborhood of Salt Lake City. 75 witnesses gathered to witness the event while blankets were placed over the windows to block the view from hundreds of curious spectators who had gathered outside. A guard placed a target over Deering's heart and a hood over his head. Prison doctor Stephen H. Besley connected sensors on Deering's wrists to an electrocardiogram, which indicated that his heart rate jumped from 72 beats per minute to over 180 when he was strapped to a chair in front of the firing squad. The five marksmen, each paid $50 by the county, were selected by Sheriff S. Grant Young. The names of the marksmen were kept secret; one was provided a rifle loaded with a blank cartridge so that they would not know who fired the lethal shot. After thanking the warden for treating him well, Deering spoke his last words: "Good-bye and good luck! Okay, let it go."

22 seconds later, Deering was shot at 6:46 AM. His heart entered into a spasm for 4 seconds and gradually stopped after 15.6 seconds. He continued to breathe and struggle in his chair for nearly a minute. Deering was pronounced dead at 6:48½ AM, 134.4 seconds after his heart had stopped. He was 40 years old.

I'm going out there and prove that those guys who said life begins at 40 are cockeyed liars.

— John Deering, October 1938

=== Aftermath ===
On November 1, 1938, Doctor Besley discussed his observations of Deering with the press: "He put on a good front. The electrocardiograph film shows his bold demeanor hid the actual emotions pounding within him. He was scared to death." Deering's eyes, which he had willed for corneal transplantation, were immediately removed, frozen, and flown via United Airlines to San Francisco. On November 8, a surgeon confirmed that tissue from Deering's corneas successfully restored sight to a 27-year-old blind man, whose name was withheld at the surgeon's request. Some of the corneal tissue was also implanted in the eyes of a four-year-old boy who had been blind since birth. Deering had previously offered the transplant to blind Utah County attorney Arnold C. Roylance, who was medically unable to accept the offer. Deering's body was donated to the medical department of the University of Utah, so that, in his own words, he could finally receive a "high class education".

On December 28, 1938, Deering's case was featured in a broadcast of the true crime radio show Gang Busters.

== See also ==
- Capital punishment in Utah
- Capital punishment in the United States
- John David Duty, another convict who pursued the death penalty in Oklahoma, but took nine years to be executed after later filing appeals.
- List of people executed in Utah
