= Ronnie Lee Gardner =

American executed in 2010 for a Utah murder

- Gardner on January 15, 2008
- Born: January 16, 1961; Salt Lake City, Utah, U.S.
- Died: June 18, 2010 (aged 49); Utah State Prison, Utah, U.S.
- Occupation: Criminal
- Children: 2
- Status: Executed by firing squad
- Motive: Robbery (Otterstrom); Escape (Burdell)
- Convictions: Robbery – February 1980; Burglary, escape – 1981; Murder – June 1985; Capital murder – October 22, 1985
- Penalty: Death

Details
- Victims: Melvyn John Otterstrom, 37; Michael Burdell, 36
- Date: October 9, 1984; April 2, 1985
- Country: United States
- State: Utah

Ronnie Lee Gardner (January 16, 1961 – June 18, 2010) was an American criminal who was sentenced to death for killing a man during an attempted escape from a courthouse in 1985, and was executed by a firing squad by the state of Utah in 2010. His case spent nearly 25 years in the court system, prompting the Utah House of Representatives to introduce legislation to limit the number of appeals in capital cases.

In October 1984, Gardner killed Melvyn John Otterstrom, 37, during a robbery in Salt Lake City. While being moved in April 1985 to a court hearing for the homicide, he fatally shot attorney Michael Burdell, 36, in an unsuccessful escape attempt. Convicted of two counts of murder, Gardner was sentenced to life imprisonment for the first charge and sentenced to death for the second charge. The state adopted more stringent security measures as a result of the incident at the courthouse. While held at Utah State Prison, Gardner was charged with another capital crime for stabbing an inmate in 1994. However, that charge was discarded by the Utah Supreme Court because the victim survived.

In a series of appeals, defense attorneys presented mitigating evidence of the troubled upbringing of Gardner, who had spent nearly his entire adult life in incarceration. His request for commutation of his death sentence was denied in 2010 after the families of his victims testified against him. Gardner's legal team took the case to the United States Supreme Court, which declined to intervene.

The execution of Gardner at Utah State Prison became the focus of media attention in 2010 because it was the first to be carried out by firing squad in the U.S. in 14 years. Gardner stated that he sought this method of execution because of his Mormon background. On the day before his execution, the Church of Jesus Christ of Latter-day Saints released a statement clarifying its position on the issue of blood atonement of individuals. The case also attracted debate over capital punishment and whether Gardner had been destined for a life of violence since his difficult childhood.

== Early life ==
Ronnie Lee Gardner was born in Salt Lake City, Utah, and was the youngest of Dan and Ruth Gardner's seven children. Dan was a heavy drinker who left the household to start another family while Ronnie was a toddler; Dan and Ruth divorced when Ronnie was 18 months old. Six months later, Ronnie was found malnourished and wandering the streets alone in a diaper. Child welfare workers filed a "failure to care" petition and took him into custody, though they later returned him to his mother. Gardner's relationship with his father was tumultuous; Dan did not believe he was Gardner's biological father and frequently told his son of his belief. According to Gardner, he was raised by an older sister, and was sexually abused by his siblings. Sometimes he and his sister Bonnie would run away and seek refuge in a "hobo camp." By the age of 10, Gardner was addicted to drugs and permitted access to alcohol. He and his brother Randy were arrested for stealing cowboy boots and taken into juvenile detention. Gardner recalled with distress that his father Dan came to take his brother Randy home and left him behind.

== Early institutionalization ==
Gardner's mother married Bill Lucas, who had been incarcerated in Wyoming in 1968. The Gardner-Lucas family eventually had nine children. Gardner admired Lucas, who used his stepsons as lookouts while burglarizing homes. By his early teens, Gardner had been held in detention at a series of institutions, including an involuntary commitment at Utah State Hospital in Provo. Gardner was small as a boy and said that he had to fight to defend himself and earn respect. As Gardner admitted, "I was a nasty little bugger."

While held at Utah State Industrial School in Ogden, Jack Statt (who was living with Gardner's brother Randy) visited Gardner. According to Gardner, Statt met Randy at a bus stop and paid him $25 for oral sex. When released from the school in 1975, Gardner stayed with Statt. Although social workers noted the men in the household were dressed like women, Statt officially became a foster parent to Gardner and his brother. Gardner said that Statt performed sex acts on them and explained, "I thought life like that was normal." Gardner stated in a psychological evaluation that he worked as a prostitute while living with Statt, who psychologists say fit the profile of a pedophile. Gardner said his time in foster care was the most stable period of his life — "Jack was a good man, and he tried to help us out."

While Gardner intermittently continued to go to the industrial school, he met Debra Bischoff at a Salt Lake City apartment complex where his mother lived. Bischoff described him as: "Very caring. He never put me in the rough situations he was in throughout his life. He sheltered me from that stuff." Gardner had a daughter in May 1977 and a son in February 1980 with Bischoff, but was convicted of robbery and sent to Utah State Prison in the same month his son was born. Gardner successfully escaped the prison's maximum security unit on April 19, 1981, and was shot in the neck while attempting to kill a man who he believed had raped Bischoff. In February 1983, he was identified as a ringleader in a disturbance in which inmates barricaded a cell block and started fires.

On August 6, 1984, Gardner escaped from custody at the University of Utah Hospital after faking an illness by vomiting. He attacked transportation officer Don Leavitt and forced him to unlock his shackles by telling him: "I guess you know if that doctor comes back, I'll have to kill you both." In the course of the escape, Gardner struck Leavitt so hard that he needed wires to reconstruct his face. Gardner forced a medical student named Mike Lynch to take him from the premises on a motorcycle while pointing a gun into his back. On August 11, a letter carrier found Leavitt's firearm in a mailbox with a note from Gardner that said, "Here's the gun and wallet taken from the guard at the hospital. I don't want to hurt no one else. I just want to be free."

== Murders ==
During the night of October 9, 1984, Gardner robbed the Cheers Tavern in Salt Lake City. While under the influence of cocaine, he shot bartender Melvyn John Otterstrom in the face, killing him. Otterstrom's cousin Craig Watson stated that the robbery "gained less than $100." Family members said Gardner attended Otterstrom's funeral and pretended to be a childhood friend. Following a tip, police apprehended Gardner three weeks later at the home of his cousin. Gardner said that the shooting occurred because Otterstrom put up a fight, but investigators did not find any evidence to support this claim. Gardner was held in custody in lieu of $1.5 million bail. His getaway driver was identified as Darcy Perry McCoy, who testified against him.

During trial proceedings for the Otterstrom murder on April 2, 1985, Gardner attempted to escape from custody with a revolver smuggled into the Metropolitan Hall of Justice at Salt Lake City. Jim Kleine of the Salt Lake City Fire Department believed that the gun was passed to Gardner as he was being escorted into the courthouse from the underground parking lot. Ronnie pulled out the gun but before he could open fire he was immediately shot in the right shoulder by guard Luther Hensley. Gardner then shot unarmed bailiff George "Nick" Kirk in the abdomen. After running to the courtroom archives, Gardner confronted attorneys Robert Macri and Michael Burdell. According to Macri, after Gardner pointed the gun at him, he changed aim to Burdell, who had been doing pro bono work for his church. Burdell yelled, "Oh, my God," then Gardner shot him in the eye. Gardner made his way outside the building, where he was surrounded by dozens of police officers. "Ordered to toss his revolver, Gardner threw it away and obeyed another order to lie down."

Gardner was taken to the University of Utah Health Services Center where he was listed in serious condition, but recovered. Burdell died about 45 minutes later while in surgery at Holy Cross Hospital. Kirk was initially listed in critical condition at LDS Hospital, but survived surgery. During a search of the courthouse, a bag of men's clothing was found in the basement under a women's restroom sink. Prosecutor Bob Stott believed Gardner's gun had been taped to a water fountain on the first floor. Darcy Perry McCoy was found unarmed and was arrested about a mile away. Her sister, Carma Jolley Hainsworth, was sentenced to eight years in prison for delivering the clothes and messages in preparation for the escape attempt, but the identity of the person who provided Gardner with the firearm was not known at the time. State corrections director William Vickrey cleared the actions of the prison guards who escorted Gardner, but Salt Lake County Sheriff N.D. "Pete" Hayward said that the guard who shot Gardner should have kept shooting until Gardner was dead. A review found that the guards were inhibited from shooting because Gardner had been using a hostage as a human shield. Sheriff Hayward said the escape attempt "appeared to be well-planned" and blamed the security breach on the layout of the Metropolitan Hall of Justice, which allowed unrestricted access to areas where prisoners were transported.

Otterstrom, a mountain climber and veteran of the 19th Special Forces Group of the Utah National Guard, was survived by his wife Kathy and his five-year-old son, Jason. Burdell — a Vietnam veteran, former engineer, and member of the Summum Church — was survived by his girlfriend, Donna Nu, who would go on to advocate against Gardner's execution.

== Sentencing and incarceration ==
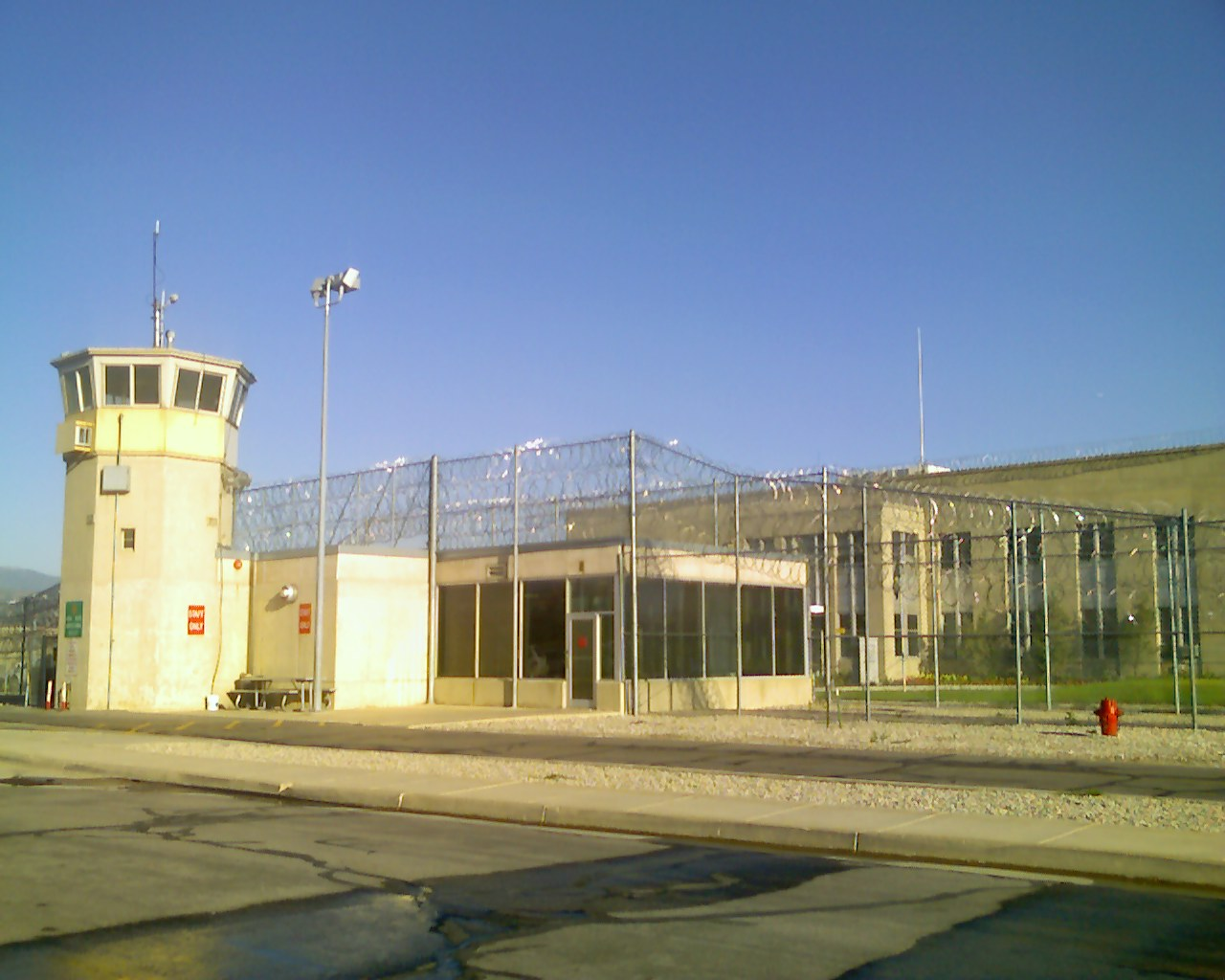
Gardner spent most of his adult life at Utah State Prison in Draper.

Gardner was diagnosed with antisocial personality disorder. In June 1985, Gardner pleaded guilty to the murder of Otterstrom and received a sentence of life imprisonment without the possibility of parole. At one point, Gardner threatened to disrupt subsequent court hearings because he was upset over being required to wear a leg brace that would lock if he attempted to escape again. He was advised by guards that it would be to his benefit to behave in front of prospective jurors. District Judge Jay E. Banks instructed the jury, on October 22, 1985, that they had the option of a verdict for the lesser offense of manslaughter if they found Gardner to be under mental or emotional duress when he shot Burdell. The jurors deliberated less than three hours and found Gardner guilty of capital murder. Ultimately sentenced to death, Gardner selected execution by firing squad over lethal injection. Legislators in Utah eliminated the firing squad as a method of execution in 2004, but convicts who were sentenced before that date, such as Gardner, could still select that option. Since 1976, only three other people have been executed by firing squad in the United States. Gary Gilmore, John Albert Taylor, and Brad Sigmon. In contrast to Taylor, who said he chose the firing squad to embarrass the state, Gardner's attorney said that his client did not want to attract attention and simply preferred to die this way.

I'd prefer to die of old age, your honor, but if that ain't possible, I'll take the firing squad.

— Ronnie Lee Gardner, 1985

Gardner's incarceration as Utah's then-youngest inmate on death row was not uneventful. A hearing was held on February 19, 1987, in which Gardner and other inmates claimed "unconstitutional confinement" in unsanitary conditions with poor food. On October 28, 1987, Gardner broke a glass partition in a prison visiting area and had sex with a woman who was meeting him, while other inmates cheered and barricaded the doors. According to state prison spokesperson Juan Benavidez, though Gardner had "knocked out the lights", an officer who was in the control room "could still see what was going on." Gardner claimed breaking the glass was an accident. In 1993, Utah state representative Dan Tuttle introduced what he called "the Ronnie Lee Gardner bill" in which he proposed that law enforcement officers be permitted to shoot inmates attempting to escape, whether they are "armed or not."

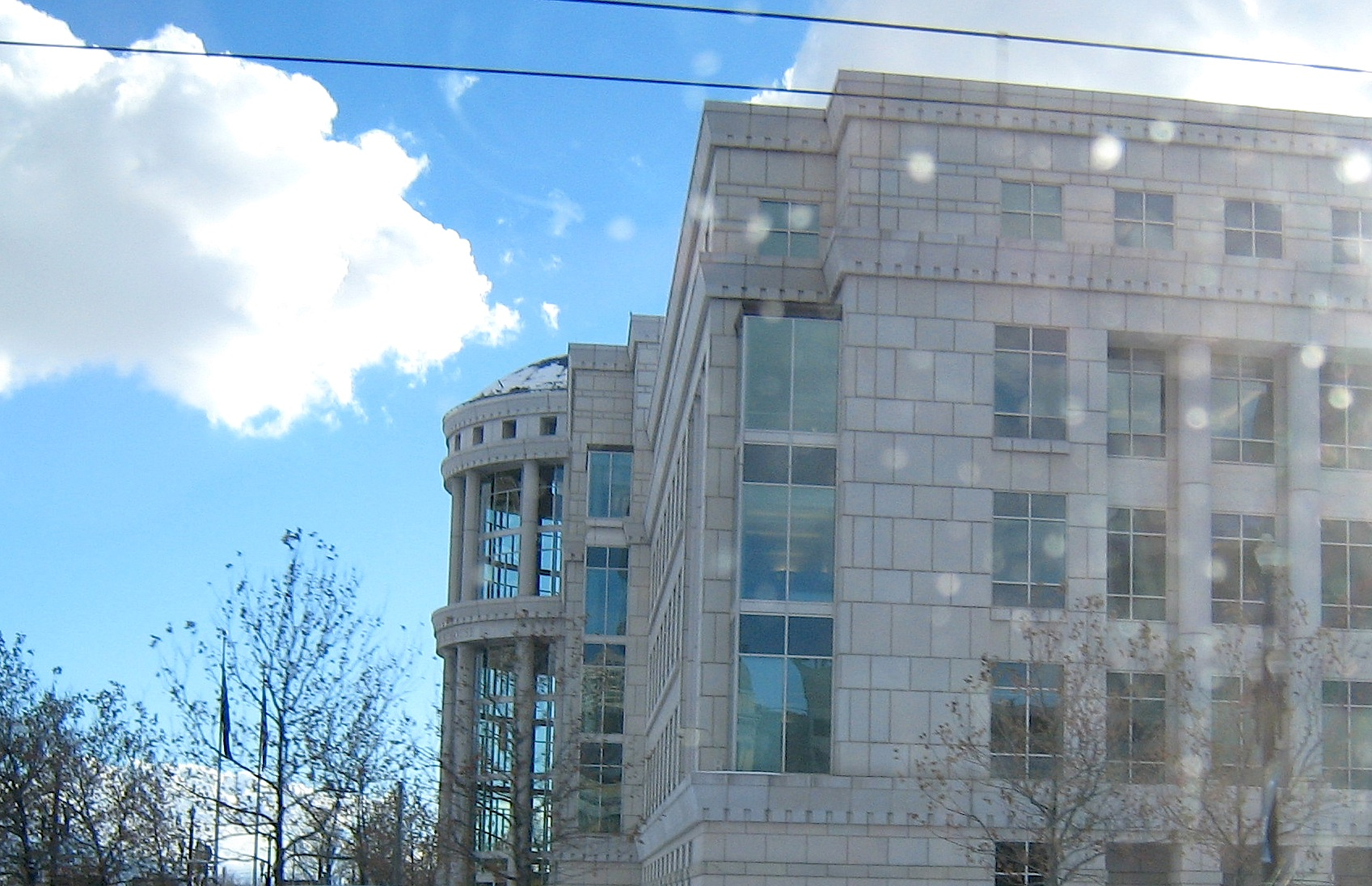
Gardner's escape attempt influenced the security measures adopted by Salt Lake City's new Matheson Courthouse.

On September 25, 1994, Gardner got drunk from consuming alcohol, which he fermented in his own prison cell sink, and stabbed inmate Richard "Fats" Thomas with a shiv fashioned from a pair of sunglasses. Thomas suffered nine puncture wounds to his face, mouth, arm and chest that were life-threatening, but made a full recovery. Though Thomas had survived the stabbing, Gardner was charged with another capital crime under a 1974 Utah law reserved for prison attacks by first-degree felony inmates. There was no precedent in the United States for a death penalty that was carried out for such a crime. The constitutionality of the law was challenged, with defense lawyers calling it "stale and anachronistic," and the charge against Gardner was thrown out by the Utah Supreme Court because the victim did not die.

In February 1996, Gardner threatened to sue to force the state of Utah to execute him by firing squad. He had told a judge in a 1991 hearing that he was motivated by his children to seek lethal injection, but later changed his mind as they became older. He said that he preferred the firing squad because of his "Mormon heritage." Gardner also felt that lawmakers were trying to eliminate the firing squad, in opposition to popular opinion in Utah, because of concern over the state's image in the upcoming 2002 Winter Olympics.

I like the firing squad. It's so much easier ... and there's no mistakes.

— Ronnie Lee Gardner, 1996

In 1998, the old Metropolitan Hall of Justice was vacated and replaced by the multimillion-dollar Scott M. Matheson Courthouse. Gardner's deadly escape attempt in 1985 was blamed on the open access and light security of the previous building and greatly influenced the tighter security measures adopted by Salt Lake City's new courthouse. Former prosecutor Kent Morgan stated, "Absolutely Gardner changed that." On March 3, 2001, the Metropolitan Hall of Justice was demolished.

=== Defense motions ===
In 2007, U.S. federal judge Tena Campbell rejected Gardner's appeal that his attorneys were inadequate because they were unable to prove that he did not mean to kill his victim. The United States Court of Appeals for the Tenth Circuit rejected motions for appeal by his defense on March 8, 2010. Gardner attempted to give up the process at least three times, but his attorneys convinced him to continue appealing each time. State court Judge Robin Reese signed an execution warrant on April 23 ordering the state to carry out the death sentence on June 18, 2010.

At Gardner's commutation hearing on June 10, 2010, lawyers and medical experts in his defense argued whether meningitis contracted at the age of 4 had damaged his brain. Gardner had also huffed gas and glue with his siblings and played with mercury stolen from gas meters by his stepfather to sell. Three of the jurors that sentenced Gardner to death signed an affidavit that they would have recommended life without parole, an option that was not available in Utah until 1992. Gardner claimed that he was a changed man who counseled other inmates and was interested in starting an organic farm project for youths on 160 acres (65 ha) in Box Elder County, Utah. Gardner's attorney presented a letter his client wrote to Oprah Winfrey requesting funds for the project. Gardner also argued that it was not justifiable to execute him after so much time had passed since the crime.

I can do a lot of good. First of all, I'm a good example. There's no better example in this state of what not to do.

— Ronnie Lee Gardner, 2010

Assistant state attorney general Tom Brunker argued against clemency, stating: "Mr. Gardner was sentenced to death and earned that death penalty because of his unflagging history of violent crime." The family of the late George "Nick" Kirk recounted how his being shot by Gardner affected their lives and ultimately shortened Kirk's life. Kirk's daughter Barb Webb said, "He's done a lot of horrific things in his past and I think, given the chance, he would do them all again." Jason Otterstrom, whose father Melvyn was murdered by Gardner, struggled to describe the impact upon his family. After listening to the testimony from the families of the victims, the Utah Board of Pardons and Parole declined Gardner's commutation request, stating that the jury's verdict and sentence were "not inappropriate." The board members cited his violent record during incarceration and questioned his effort to reform as being "too little, too late." Gardner revealed at the hearing that it was Darcy Perry McCoy who provided him the gun with which he murdered Michael Burdell. Deputy Salt Lake County attorney Bob Stott said that McCoy would not be prosecuted because Gardner, the only witness, was going to be executed.

I feel really sorry for him; I do feel sorry. But he made that choice.

— Tami Stewart, daughter of shooting victim George "Nick" Kirk

The Utah Supreme Court upheld lower court rulings on June 14, 2010, exhausting Gardner's appeals within the state. The U.S. Supreme Court turned down final appeals on June 17, though a court order indicated that dissenting Justices Stephen Breyer and John Paul Stevens would have granted a stay of execution. Utah governor Gary Herbert also declined to intervene because Gardner had "a full and fair opportunity" in court. State attorney general Mark Shurtleff announced on Twitter that he signed off on the execution: "I just gave the go ahead to Corrections Director to proceed with Gardner's execution."

=== Death penalty debate ===
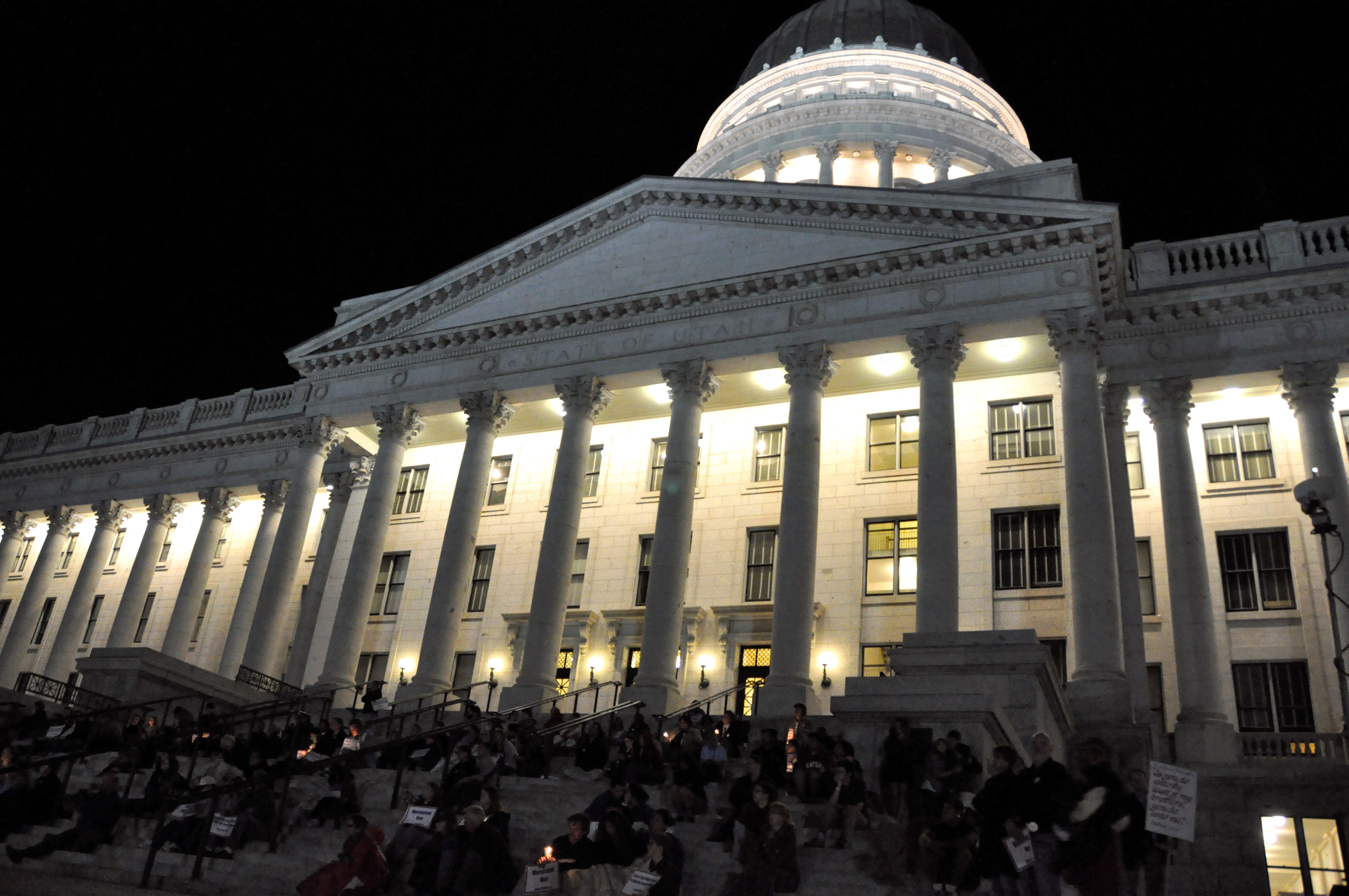
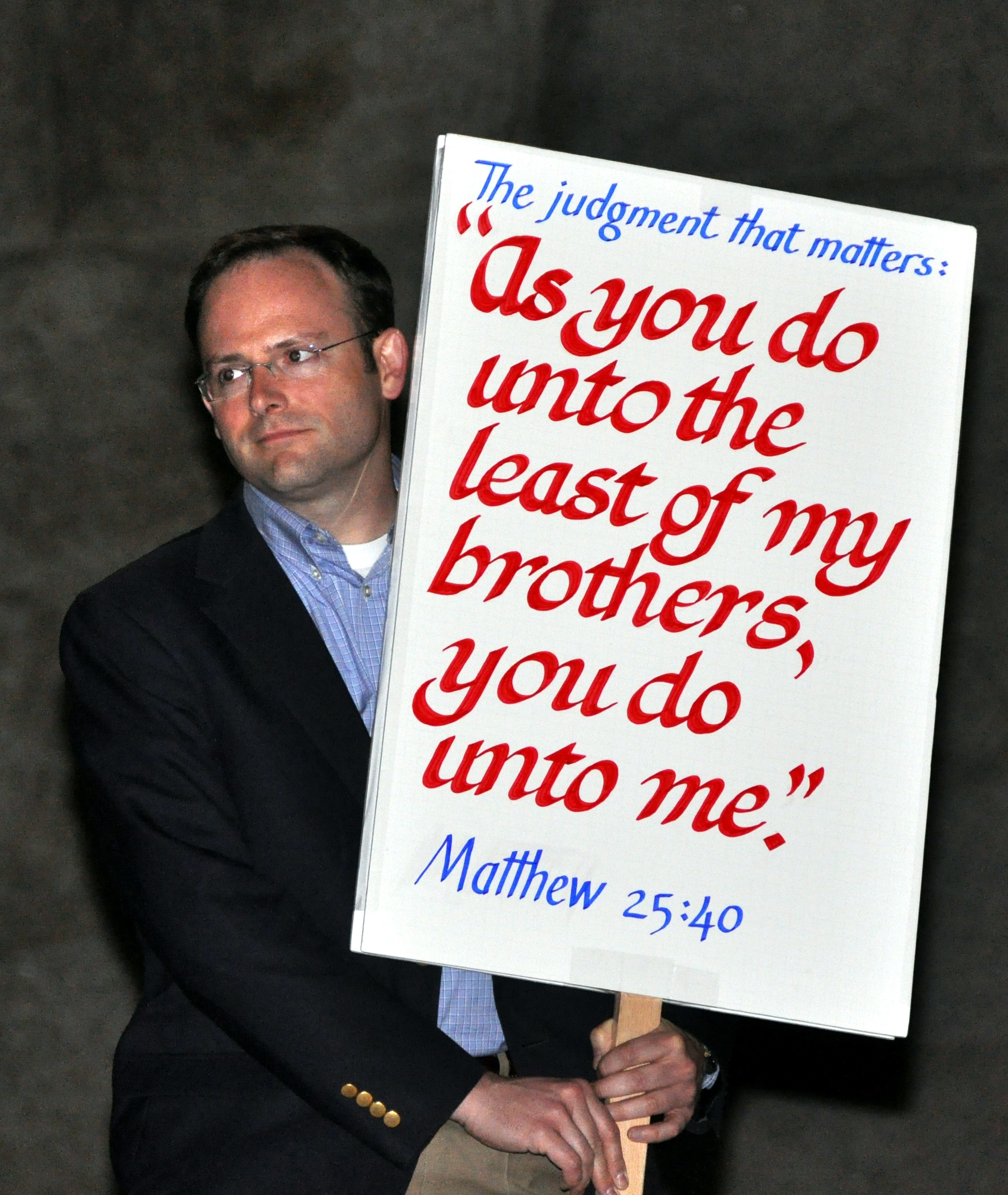
On the night before Gardner's execution, a protest against capital punishment was held at the Utah State Capitol.

Opponents of capital punishment gathered at the Utah State Capitol to hold a rally during the final appeals. The protest was attended by Gardner's family, and was organized by Utahans for Alternatives to the Death Penalty. The protest also included the support of Brian King of the Utah House of Representatives, who pledged to urge the legislature to reconsider the use of the capital punishment. The family of murder victim Michael Burdell had also appealed on Gardner's behalf, stating that Burdell was a pacifist who would have opposed the death penalty.

News media arrived from around the world and raised the issue of blood atonement because of Gardner's citation of his Mormon roots in selecting the firing squad. On the day before Gardner's execution, The Church of Jesus Christ of Latter-day Saints condemned the idea of blood atonement as a way to salvation. They released the following statement:

In the mid-19th century, when rhetorical, emotional oratory was common, some church members and leaders used strong language that included notions of people making restitution for their sins by giving up their own lives.

However, so-called "blood atonement," by which individuals would be required to shed their own blood to pay for their sins, is not a doctrine of The Church of Jesus Christ of Latter-day Saints. We believe in and teach the infinite and all-encompassing atonement of Jesus Christ, which makes forgiveness of sin and salvation possible for all people.

Other religious figures voiced their opposition to the use of capital punishment. Keith O'Brien, a Roman Catholic Cardinal in Scotland, later used Gardner's cases to describe the "culture of vengeance" in the United States.

According to polls, support for capital punishment had been steadily declining since the 1990s, but the majority of people in Utah still supported the death penalty in the period leading up to Gardner's scheduled execution. In 2010, Kay McIff of the Utah House of Representatives sponsored legislation to require condemned inmates to raise all appeal arguments in their first post-conviction petition, noting that Gardner's multiple appeals kept his case lingering on death row for nearly 25 years. The bill, HB202, passed the Utah House by a margin of 67-to-5 on February 1, 2011, and unanimously passed the Utah State Senate on February 17. The legislation was signed into law by the Governor on 22 March 2011.

== Execution ==
The Utah Department of Corrections provided Gardner's attorney, Andrew Parnes, with documentation about executions by firing squad and lethal injection. The records included the Utah execution team's training and expertise. Parnes relayed the information to Gardner after agreeing not to disclose it to anyone else.

On June 15, 2010, Gardner ate a last meal of steak, lobster tail, apple pie, vanilla ice cream and 7-Up, before beginning a 48-hour fast while watching The Lord of the Rings film trilogy and reading Divine Justice. According to his lawyers, the fast was motivated by "spiritual reasons." Gardner was visited by an LDS bishop and his family before his execution. Gardner walked voluntarily to his place of execution. When asked if he had any last words, he responded, "I do not, no."

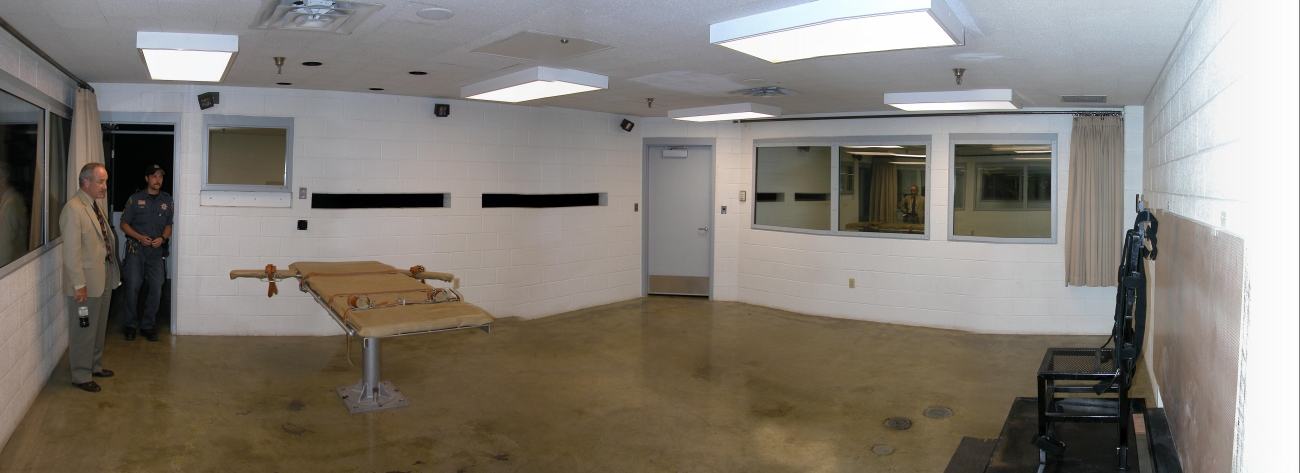
Gardner was executed on the metal chair at the right side of this chamber in Utah State Prison. The two narrow rifle ports can be seen in the middle-left.

Gardner was executed on June 18, 2010, at 12:15 a.m. Mountain Daylight Time by a firing squad at Utah State Prison in Draper. He was placed in restraints on a black metal chair with a hood covering his head. Sandbags were arranged around him to absorb ricochets. The firing squad was made up of five anonymous volunteers who were certified police officers. The officers stood about 25 feet (7.6 m) from Gardner, aiming at a white target positioned over his heart. The firing squad's .30-caliber Winchester rifles were loaded with live ammunition except for one that contained a non-lethal wax bullet. According to the Utah Department of Corrections, the squad used a countdown cadence beginning with five and simultaneously firing right before two. His dark blue jumpsuit made it difficult to see the blood from his wounds. A medical examiner removed Gardner's hood to reveal his lifeless face. After verifying Gardner's lack of pulse at the neck and pupillary light reflex, the medical examiner pronounced him dead at 12:17 a.m. He was the first person to be executed by firing squad in the United States since the execution of John Albert Taylor 14 years earlier. A commemorative coin was commissioned for prison staff who participated in the execution. Gardner's friends and family gathered outside the prison at a candlelight vigil while playing "Free Bird" by Lynyrd Skynyrd. They did not witness his execution, per his request. Some wore shirts with his prisoner number 14873. His body was cremated and released to his daughter to be taken back to Idaho with family members.

Ultimately, his children and grandchildren got their chance to express their love for him. I'm not sure Ronnie had a lot of love in his life. At least in the end there, he got that.

— Andrew Valdez, defense attorney

Gardner's brother Randy Gardner has become an outspoken opponent of the death penalty, often wearing Ronnie's prison jumpsuit to anti-death penalty demonstrations.

== See also ==
- Capital punishment in Utah
- Grandfather clause
- List of people executed in Utah
- List of people executed in the United States in 2010
- Religion and capital punishment

Executions by firing squad in the United States
Preceded by John Albert Taylor – Utah January 26, 1996	Ronnie Lee Gardner – Utah; June 18, 2010	Succeeded by Brad Sigmon – South Carolina March 7, 2025
Executions carried out in Utah
Preceded by Joseph Mitchell Parsons October 15, 1999	Ronnie Lee Gardner; June 18, 2010	Succeeded by Taberon Honie August 8, 2024
Executions carried out in the United States
Preceded by David Lee Powell – Texas June 15, 2010	Ronnie Lee Gardner – Utah; June 18, 2010	Succeeded by Michael James Perry – Texas July 1, 2010
