= The Point (Utah) =

Mixed-use development in Utah

The Point is a planned mixed-use development district in Draper, Utah, United States on the former site of Utah State Prison. The project occupies approximately 600 acres near the Point of the Mountain and is overseen by the Point of the Mountain State Land Authority (POMSLA).

The redevelopment is planned to include housing, office spaces, retail, parks, trails, entertainment, and transit infrastructure. The first phase centers on a mixed-use district with public open space, a pedestrian-oriented main street called the Promenade, and connections to regional trails and future transit.

== History ==
The Utah State Prison operated in Draper between 1951 and 2022 when the site relocated to the new Utah State Correctional Facility in Salt Lake City. Demolition of the former prison began in November 2022.

In 2023, POMSLA selected a private development team for the first phase of the project. Infrastructure work began in December 2024 with the groundbreaking of the Porter Rockwell Boulevard extension, a major road project intended to support the redevelopment.

== Development ==
The Point is being developed in phases. Phase I includes 3,300 multi-family residential units, about 400 of which will be affordable housing units. Other elements include a center green space and an innovation district.
