= James W. Rodgers =

American murderer (1910–1960)

- Rodgers in 1958
- Born: August 3, 1910; Lubbock, Texas, U.S.
- Died: March 30, 1960 (aged 49); Utah State Prison, Draper, Utah, U.S.
- Cause of death: Execution by firing squad
- Occupation: Construction worker
- Status: Executed
- Convictions: First degree murder Armed robbery
- Penalty: Death

James Woode Rodgers (August 3, 1910 – March 30, 1960) was an American who was sentenced to death by the state of Utah for the murder of miner Charles Merrifield in 1957. In his final statement before his execution by firing squad in 1960, Rodgers requested a bulletproof vest. His execution by firing squad would be the last to be carried out in the United States before capital punishment was halted by the U.S. Supreme Court. The death penalty was reinstated in 1976 and the first person executed in Utah subsequent to that date was Gary Gilmore in 1977.

== Background ==
Rodgers was born on August 3, 1910, in Lubbock, Texas, and was the eldest of five brothers and six sisters. His education was interrupted during the eighth grade. At the age of twelve, he left his family's household, where his father forced the children to work. By the age of sixteen, he became involved in a bootlegging operation and was injured in the legs by machine gun fire. Rodgers eventually became involved in armed robbery, spending over twenty years in incarceration at various prisons.

== Death of Charles Merrifield ==
Merrifield was killed near La Sal, Utah.

In 1957, Rodgers came from New Mexico to work as a part-time security guard with the Continental Uranium Company at its Rattlesnake uranium mine near La Sal, Utah. Following an altercation on June 19 of that year, James W. Rodgers shot miner Charles Merrifield, who died of multiple gunshot wounds to the head, arm, and torso. The two had been arguing over how to properly grease a scoop shovel.

Rodgers drove off in his truck, but was quickly apprehended in Colorado and turned over to the Grand County Jail in San Juan County, Utah. He claimed that he had been repeatedly threatened and thought Merrifield was going to "beat him up." Rodgers said that he "challenged Merrifield with a gun" and shot him when Merrifield attacked him with a large wrench.

=== Murder trial ===
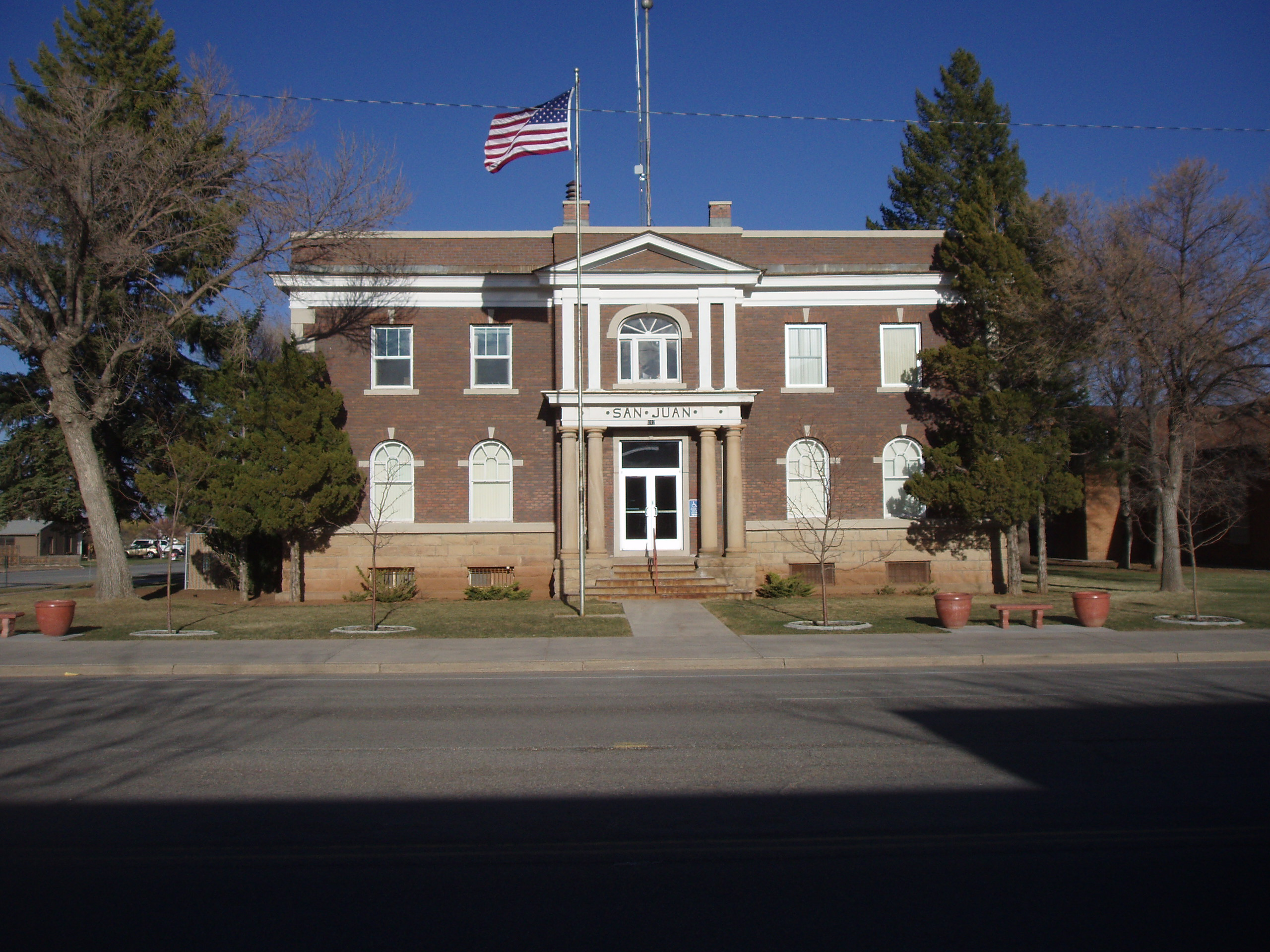
San Juan County Courthouse in Monticello, Utah.

Rodgers was arraigned at the San Juan County Courthouse in Monticello, Utah, on June 26, 1957, and was formally charged with murder. Rodgers claimed that he was suffering from syphilis and pleaded "guilty by reason of insanity". During the trial, Rodgers asserted that he had killed Merrifield in self-defense. However, Merrifield was determined to have been shot by Rodgers' .38-caliber handgun while at the controls of the large shovel at the mine. Upon being convicted and sentenced to death, Rodgers was given the choice of execution by firing squad or hanging; he chose to be shot. Rodgers said that he was not worried because he would succumb to syphilis before his execution. However, he did not test positive for the disease under medical examination. Rodgers filed three appeals, including one to the Supreme Court of Utah, all of which were denied.

Rodgers was sent to death row at Utah State Prison, where he was considered a model prisoner and wrote of his "deepest gratitude for the many favors and the kindness" during his 2 years as an inmate. He made no request for a special last meal nor other favors before his execution.

=== Execution ===
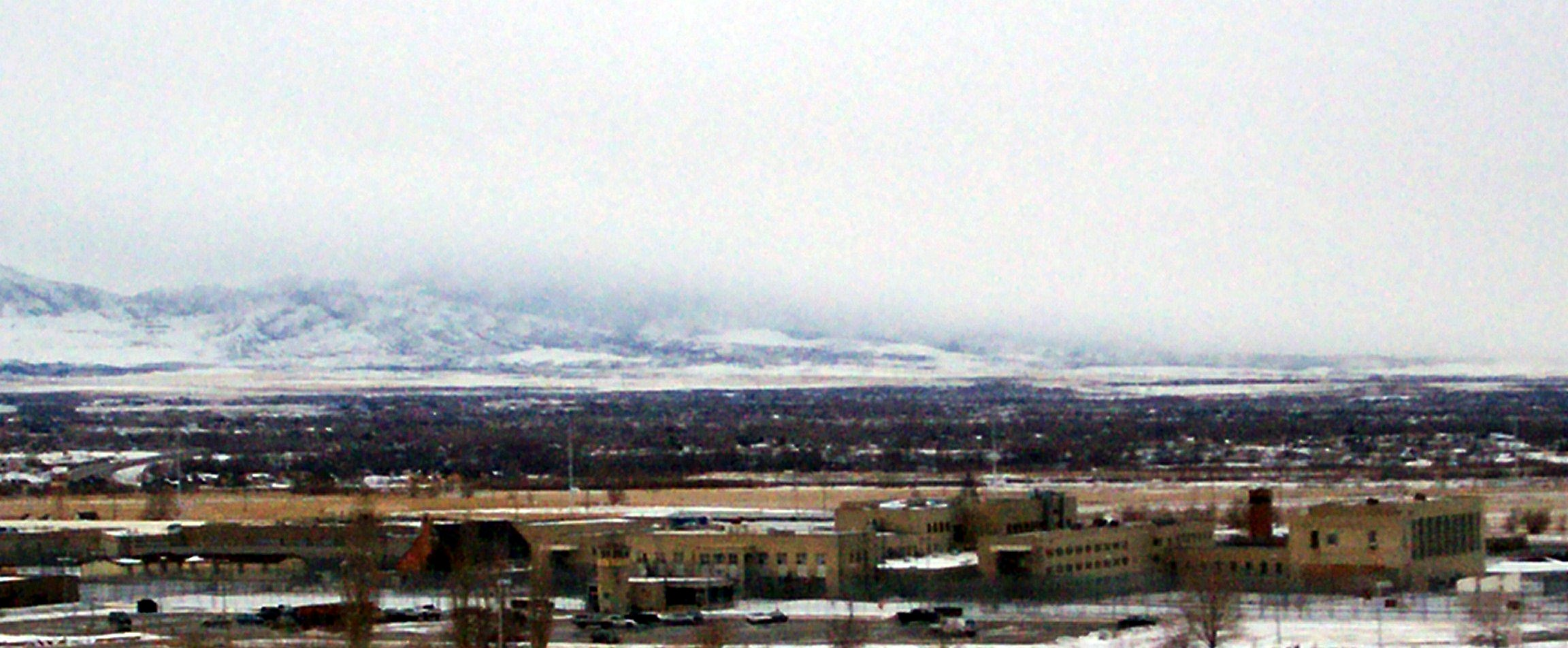
Rodgers awaited execution on death row at Utah State Prison.

On the morning of March 30, 1960, Rodgers was driven to the execution site on a clay flat about a mile (1.6 km) from the prison accompanied by San Juan County Sheriff Seth Wright and a prison chaplain. When asked for a final statement, Rodgers continued to insist that he was innocent and said, "I done told you my last request ... a bulletproof vest." He was dressed in denim and offered a coat, to which he replied, "Don't worry, I'll be where it's warm soon." Rodgers was strapped to a wooden chair inside a 20-foot (6.1 m) canvas enclosure. The firing squad, concealed in a smaller burlap enclosure about 23 feet (7.0 m) away, consisted of five volunteers who were paid $75 each($655.43 in 2020 USD). One of the marksmen was provided with a .30-30 rifle that was loaded with a blank, so that none of them would be certain who fired the lethal shots. Rodgers was executed at 6:16 a.m., the time of sunrise.

Rodgers's body was claimed for burial in California by his mother, who had last visited him ten days before the execution. Rodgers would be the last person to die by firing squad in the United States for almost 17 years, until Gary Gilmore became the first to be executed after the reinstatement of capital punishment by the U.S. Supreme Court decision of Gregg v. Georgia.

I gave him a nice burial even tho [sic] I am a widow with $90.00 per month to pay for it. I could not see him buried in Potter's field ... I know his soul is in heaven with God and I will meet him someday ...

— Letter to the prison chaplain from the mother of James W. Rodgers, 1960

== See also ==
- Capital punishment in Utah
- Capital punishment in the United States
- List of people executed in Utah
- List of people executed in the United States in 1960

Preceded by Barton Kay Kirkham	Executions by the state of Utah	Succeeded by Gary Gilmore
