= Ray Dempsey Gardner =

Executed American serial killer

- Gardner's mugshot at the Utah State Prison
- Born: October 4, 1921; Columbus, Ohio, U.S.
- Died: September 29, 1951 (aged 29); Utah State Prison, Utah, U.S.
- Status: Executed by firing squad
- Conviction: First degree murder
- Penalty: Death

Details
- Victims: 3
- Span of crimes: 1941–1949
- Country: United States
- States: North Dakota, Utah, Montana
- Date apprehended: August 14, 1949

Ray Dempsey Gardner (October 4, 1921 – September 29, 1951) was an American serial killer who killed three people in three states in the 1940s. Gardner, who had a lengthy criminal record, was convicted of a murder he committed in Utah, sentenced to death, and executed in 1951.

== Early life ==
Gardner had a lengthy criminal record, spanning over 500 crimes. His father died in a shootout with the police, and his mother went to prison, so Gardner was raised in an orphanage in Columbus, Ohio. Gardner served time in the Indiana Boys School, the Montana State Prison, and the Wyoming State Penitentiary.

== Murders ==
In 1941, Gardner strangled his cellmate, Frank Shelley, in a jail in Jamestown, North Dakota. Officials thought Shelley had died of natural causes, and Gardner was never charged.

On July 20, 1949, in Ogden, Utah, 17-year-old Shirley Gretzinger left her mother's house to walk to a babysitting job. She had not planned on leaving that evening, but a friend was sick and had referred the caller to Gretzinger. Gretzinger's mother was worried since she did not know who her daughter would be sitting for. The caller was Gardner. When Gardner picked Gretzinger up, he took her to a gulch outside of the city instead of the location he proposed. When Gretzinger spurned his sexual advances, Gardner stuffed wadded toilet paper down her throat and raped her as she was dying. Gardner also stole Gretzinger's purse and magazines, mutilated her, and left her body lying in a thicket.

Gardner then went to Montana, where he answered a newspaper ad from 38-year-old Sue Ella Horne, who was seeking a job as a cook on a ranch. He picked Horne up in Butte, Montana, and drove her outside of the city. When Gardner tried to take her money, Horne refused, slapped him, and jumped out of the car, presumably to get the police. Gardner then shot her, took her belongings, and buried her.

Gardner was not a suspect in any of the murders until August 14, 1949. That day, he was driving back to the farm where he worked in a new car. He fled when he saw one of the sons of his employer's home. Gardner drove through a stop sign and ran into and overturned a trailer on the main highway without stopping. He was later arrested and, after being found with stolen clothing and a pistol from the farm, was charged with grand larceny, hit-and-run driving, and running through a stop sign. The police became suspicious after they found Horne's luggage and clothing in the car, and realized she was missing. Gardner also faced a federal charge of interstate transportation of a stolen vehicle.

After a polygraph test indicated that Gardner had information about Horne, he confessed to killing her and led police to a shallow grave where he buried the body. He also confessed to killing Gretzinger and Shelley, giving police a tour of the crime scene for Gretzinger's murder, but later retracted his confession and tried to blame an unknown friend.

Although Gardner was initially charged with killing Horne, he only stood trial for killing Gretzinger in Utah. On December 13, 1949, he was found guilty of first degree murder. The jury, which deliberated for 58 minutes, did not recommend mercy, making a death sentence mandatory.

== Execution ==
Gardner made several unsuccessful appeals for execution. He lost his last bid to stay alive after the Utah Board of Pardons and Parole rejected his request for leniency so that he could be used as a "guinea pig" for science. The prosecution called Gardner a dangerous sadist. Gardner, who was given the choice of being shot or hanged, chose to be executed by firing squad.

Gardner was executed by firing squad at the Utah State Prison on September 29, 1951. Five rifles opened fire at him together after Sheriff Mac Wade ordered "Ready, aim, fire." Gardner's last words were, "I'm ready to go. No one will miss me. My life has been worthless."

When the prison warden wrote to Gardner's grandmother, his nearest living relative, she responded: "In referring to your letter … in regard to Ray Gardner’s body being shipped to Ohio. I am not able to have him sent here … his mother is dead. We knew nothing about him for eight years until we read of him committing the crime. … I have no further responsibility of care. Use the body as the law directs for medical science."

== See also ==
- Capital punishment in Utah
- List of people executed in Utah
- List of people executed in the United States in 1951
- List of serial killers in the United States
