= Barton Kay Kirkham =

American murderer and last person to be executed by hanging in Utah (1936–1958)

- Kirkham's Utah State Prison mug shot
- Born: November 29, 1936; Salt Lake City, Utah, U.S.
- Died: June 7, 1958 (aged 21); Utah State Prison, Utah, U.S.
- Resting place: Elysian Burial Gardens, Millcreek, Utah, U.S. 40°40′20.19″N 111°51′31.83″W
- Status: Executed by hanging
- Convictions: Robbery (1955); First degree murder (1956)
- Penalty: Death

Barton Kay Kirkham (November 29, 1936 – June 7, 1958) was an American murderer. He was a member of the United States Air Force who was discharged in 1955 after committing a robbery in Colorado while absent without leave (AWOL). In 1956, he was sentenced to death after the murder of two grocery store clerks during an armed robbery in Salt Lake City, Utah.

Kirkham chose to die by hanging to generate publicity and become an inconvenience to the state of Utah. Though an attempt was made to appeal his conviction by questioning his sanity, prison officials noted that Kirkham's defiant attitude remained remorseless until shortly before his execution, at which point he started crying and is reported to have wet himself. His hanging at Utah State Prison in 1958 was the first to be carried out by the state in 46 years. Kirkham is the last prisoner to be hanged by the state of Utah.

== Background ==
Barton Kay Kirkham was the eldest of five children raised in Salt Lake City. He was a fan of bop music and described himself as "a rebel." Kirkham left his family's church life and school in the 11th grade and joined the United States Air Force. After 18 months, he committed a robbery while absent without leave in Colorado, and was given an undesirable discharge from the service. Kirkham spent the next 9 months in a reformatory and was paroled in July 1956.

=== Murders ===
On the night of August 12, 1956, Kirkham entered the Nibley Park Market grocery store in Salt Lake City to rob it. When he thought 50-year-old storekeeper David Avon Frame was not giving him all of the money that he had, Kirkham took Frame to the back of the store. There he found 37-year-old Ruth Holmes Webster, mother of four children in Sandy, Utah. Kirkham had them kneel on the floor and shot them in the head. He netted $54 from the robbery.

Kirkham was apprehended the next morning after he forced a brother and sister to take him on a joyride through Provo Canyon. When later asked about his motive for killing Frame and Webster, he said, "Man, I don't know..."

=== Trial and sentencing ===
The first-degree murder trial commenced on December 12, 1956, with Judge Martin M. Larson presiding over the case. Kirkham was defended by attorneys Lamar C. Duncan and Wayne L. Black. On December 14, Kirkham was found guilty of murdering Frame, without a recommendation for mercy, and faced a mandatory death sentence. He was never tried for the murder of Webster. Kirkham was remanded to Utah State Prison on January 11, 1957, as the sentencing phase of the trial proceeded. Kirkham's attorneys immediately filed an appeal with the Utah Supreme Court. The appeal claimed that their client's mental state was not properly taken into account. On March 25, 1958, the court upheld Kirkham's conviction and denied his request for a rehearing, sending his case back for sentencing. Kirkham said he was certain he would be executed and resented his attorneys' "trying to prolong the waiting and stalling around."

On April 26, 1958, Judge Larson sentenced Kirkham to death. When asked to select between the option of execution by firing squad and hanging, he responded: "What costs most?" Kirkham said he chose to be hanged "because of the publicity... the novelty... to put the state to more inconvenience." He also noted that the state might not execute him in that manner, and he might therefore get off "scot free". It would be the first hanging in Utah since 1912. Kirkham said that he hoped "to set some sort of record."

I heard the shooters get to keep the guns, and they're not getting anything free from me.

— Barton Kay Kirkham

=== Incarceration ===
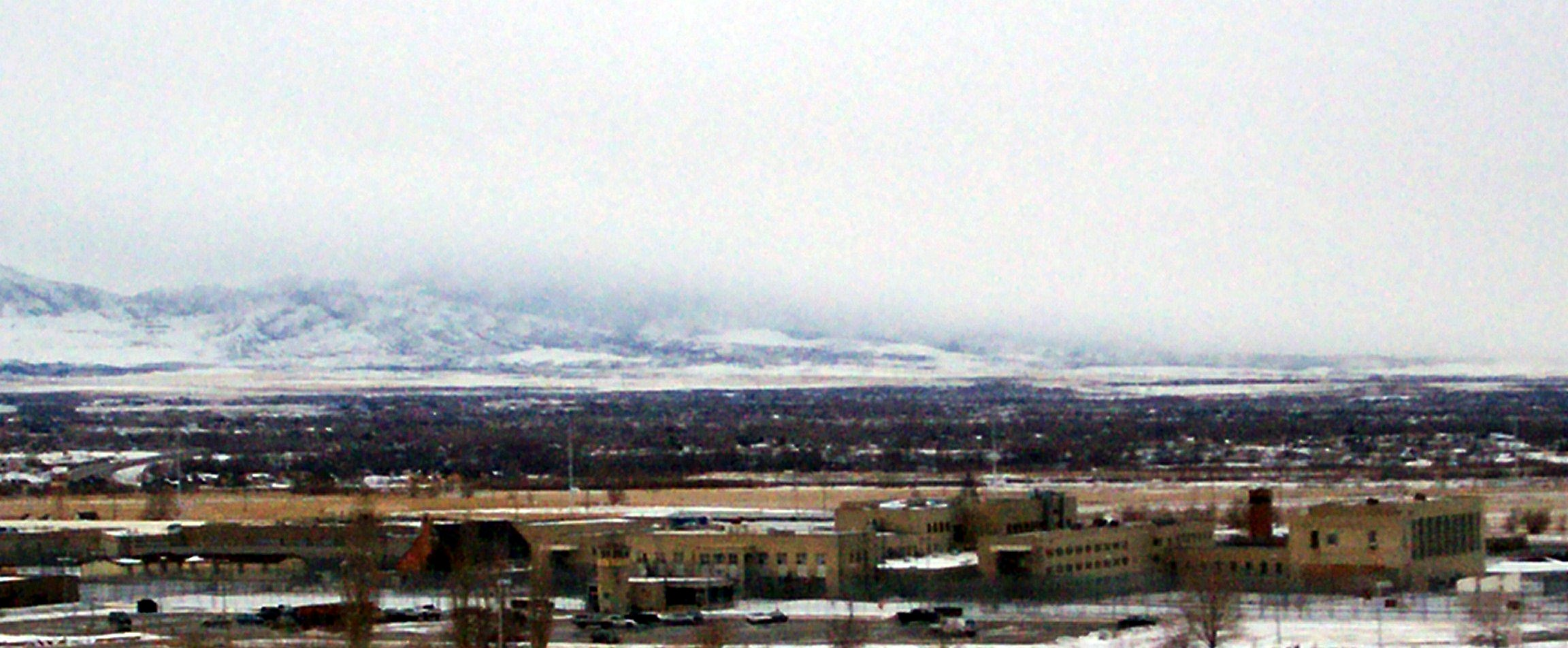
Kirkham awaited execution on death row at Utah State Prison.

While on death row at Utah State Prison, Kirkham followed newspaper articles and legal briefs of his case and read psychiatric texts and medical journals. Warden Marcell Graham described him as a good prisoner who caused little trouble. Kirkham grew out his hair and beard for 13 months until ordered to get a haircut. He then shaved himself bald to annoy the prison officials. Kirkham maintained a hardened image and reportedly laughed off concepts of mercy or religious salvation. He claimed to have no regret over the killings.

There was so much hate in me then and it keeps building up and there was no release for it and I did not care what happened. The Doctors said I felt justified when I killed those people and they are right. I did. It was revenge I was after. The love that I was denied because my parents spent so much time doing church work and they still do, and forcing me to stay home and lead the life they wanted me to live. I got my revenge and I am not sorry now and never will be... I've had enough of it, I want to die. I'm fed up with it all. I did kill those people to hurt my parents and their good standing in the church. Who failed me? It was not only my parents but myself and a lot of others. My life is a real mess now and I will be glad when it is all over with.

— Barton Kay Kirkham, Written statement before his execution

On June 4, 1958, Kirkham appeared before the state pardons board for a final hearing for clemency. His attorneys had planned to demonstrate that he was insane with the help of psychiatrists. Kirkham initially told the board that he was a loner and felt "no remorse or anything like that." In the final minutes of the hearing, he broke out into an appeal that he would prefer involuntary commitment in a mental institution over capital punishment. The board declined to commute his sentence.

I don't want life. My parents are the ones who want me commuted. They think you can be rehabilitated in prison... but rehabilitation comes from within.

— Barton Kay Kirkham, May 1958

== Execution ==
Kirkham was visited by his parents the night before his hanging. Prison guards noted that he changed his demeanor as he received his parents warmly and was seen by local, religious chaplains. His mother was near collapse. Kirkham watched a movie with his parents and said farewell shortly before midnight. Kirkham ordered a last meal of pizza and ice cream, telling the prison steward that "you get cheese, meat and everything in one meal. Not so much fuss." In the auditorium of Utah State Prison, Kirkham ate his pizza and played classical music on a piano in the company of the chaplains, news reporters and deputy sheriffs. He joked about his impending execution and commented on his keyboard skills: "I'll just have to practice more."

When you live with the thought of dying so long, you get used to it. I may get shook up at the last minute, but I don't think so.

— Barton Kay Kirkham, May 1958

At dawn on June 7, 1958, Kirkham was driven two miles to a pasture on the prison's farm. After a black hood was placed over his head, Kirkham was led up a ramp to a newly built gallows. His drop had been measured at 6 feet to accommodate his reported weight of 200 pounds. A professional hangman from the Northwest was paid $400 (equivalent to $4,464 in 2025) for his services. Kirkham trembled slightly as the hangman fitted a noose around his neck and placed the knot under his left ear. As directed by state law, Sheriff George Beckstead walked up to Kirkham to receive his last words. At 4:57 a.m. Mountain Time Zone, the official time of dawn, Beckstead signaled the hangman, who pulled an iron lever opening the trap door under Kirkham. The Kirkham family did not come to witness the execution. Prison physician W. C. Knott climbed on a stepladder to examine Kirkham's hanging body, which was concealed from view by burlap and canvas hung under the 11-foot-high platform. He was pronounced dead at 5:11 AM.

I've asked God to forgive me.

— Last words of Barton Kay Kirkham, June 7, 1958

In February 1980, the Utah State Legislature replaced the option of hanging with lethal injection.

== See also ==
- Capital punishment in Utah
- Capital punishment in the United States
- List of people executed in Utah
- List of people executed in the United States in 1958

Preceded by Verne Alfred Braasch and Melvin Leroy Sullivan	Executions in Utah since 1976	Succeeded by James W. Rodgers
