= Utah State Prison =

Former mixed security prison in Draper, Utah, United States

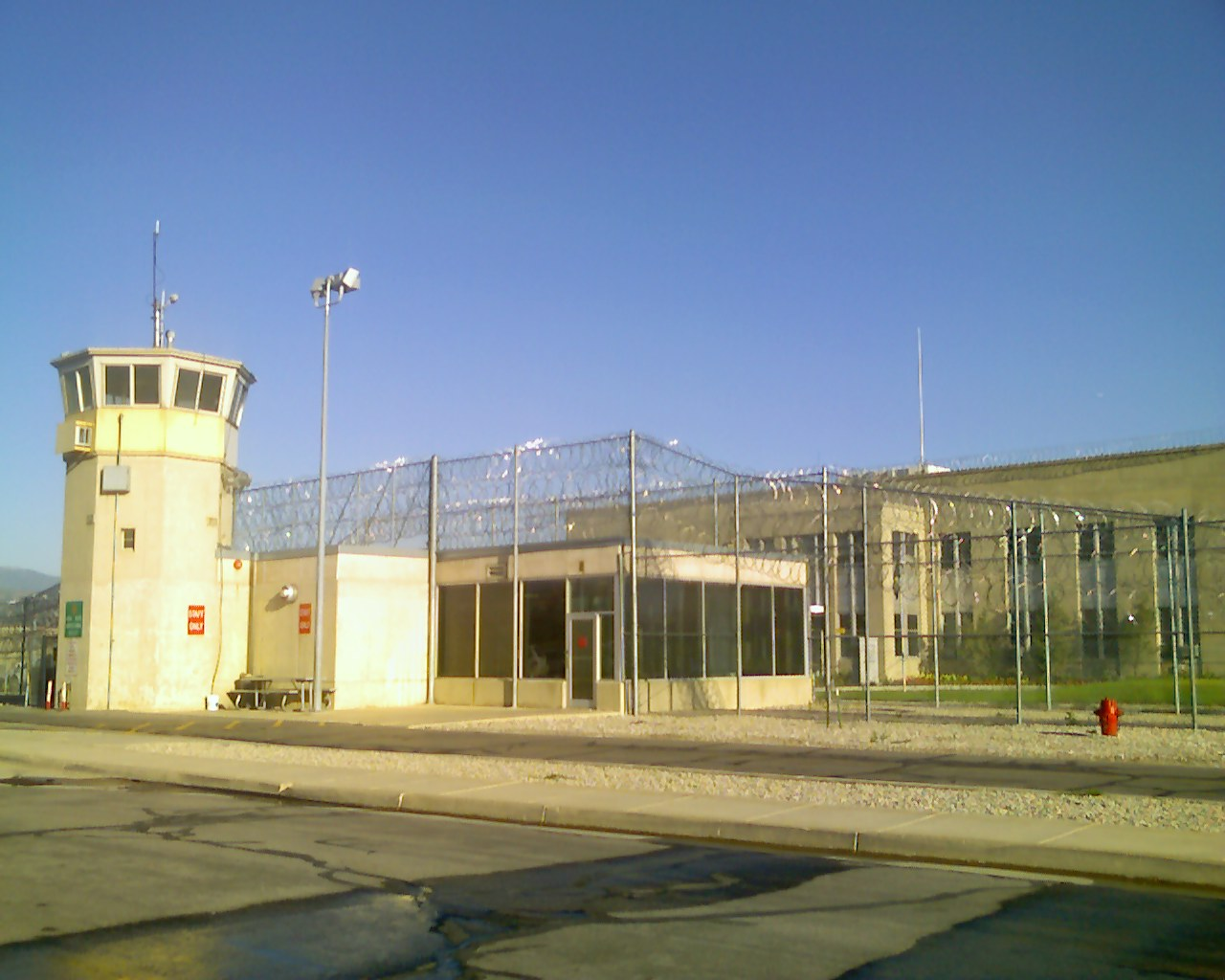
- Entrance to the Wasatch Facility of the prison, June 2007
- Interactive map of Utah State Prison
- Location: Draper, Utah; 40°29.5′N 111°54′W
- Status: Closed (Replaced by Utah State Correctional Facility)
- Security class: Mixed
- Capacity: >4000
- Opened: 1951
- Closed: July 15, 2022
- Managed by: Utah Department of Corrections
- Director: Brian Nielsen

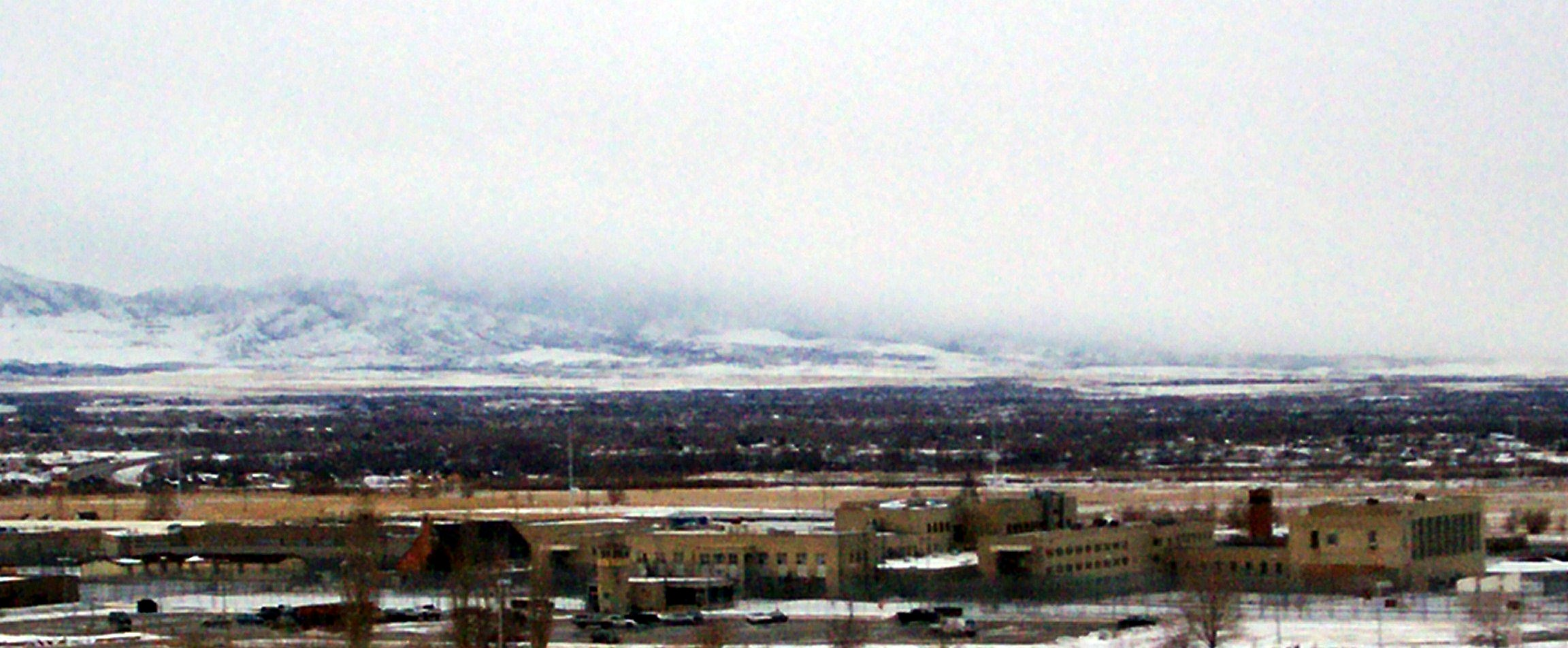
Utah State Prison main complex, December 2007

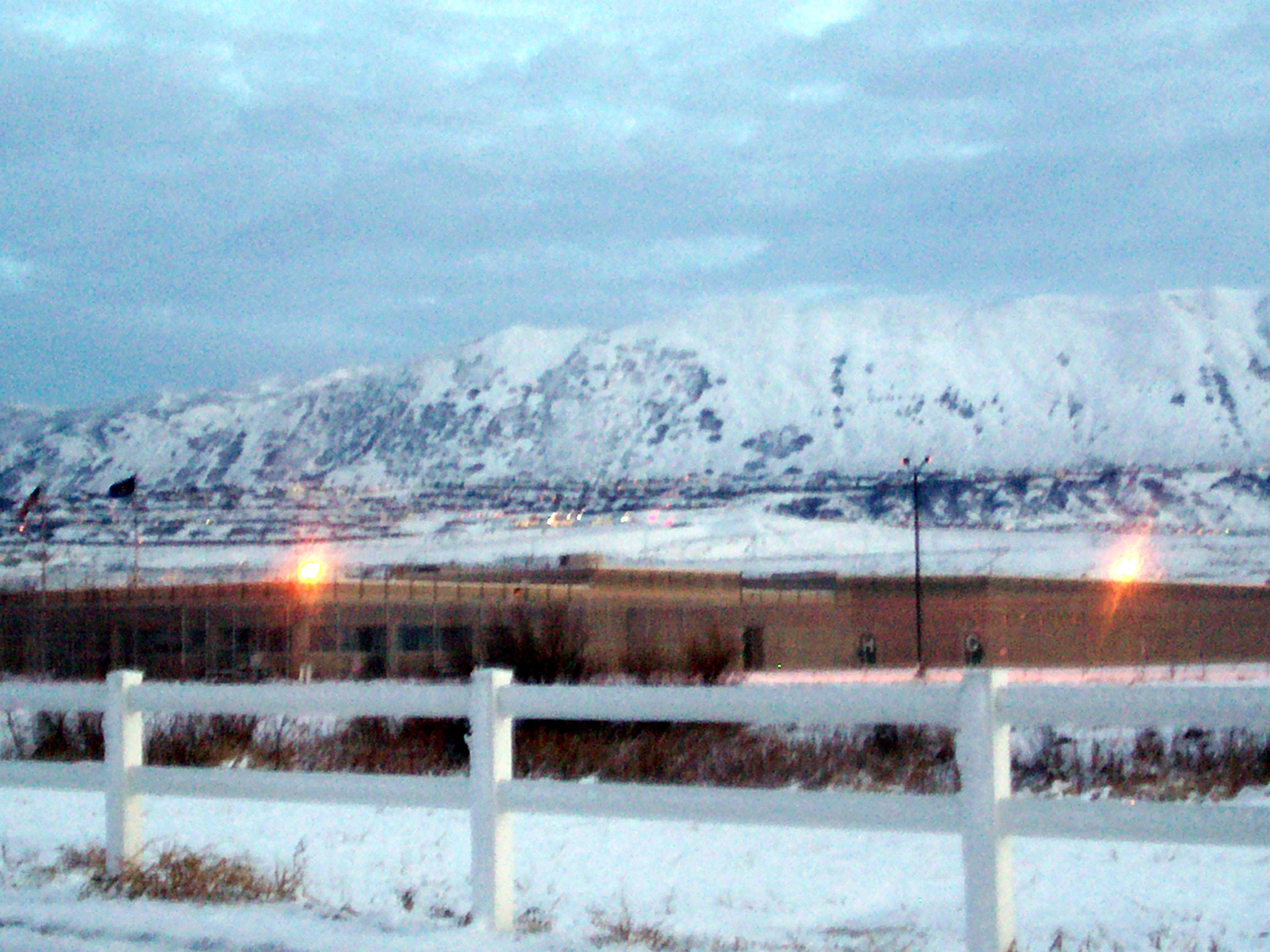
Promontory Unit of the prison, December 2007

Utah State Prison (USP) was one of two prisons managed by the Utah Department of Corrections' Division of Institutional Operations. It was located in Draper, Utah, United States, about 20 miles (32 km) southwest of Salt Lake City. It was replaced by the Utah State Correctional Facility in July 2022.

== History ==
The prison was built to replace Sugar House Prison, which closed in 1951. Its location was once remote and the nearby communities were rural. Since the prison's erection, business parks and residential neighborhoods have developed the once rural area into a suburban one. Seeking the ability to offer better treatment option state legislature initiated a process to build a new prison, deciding it was best to relocate elsewhere. Several sites were under consideration. An episode of Touched by an Angel was filmed here in 2001. A study was completed in 2005 by Wikstrom Economic & Planning Consultants, Inc., to determine if moving the prison would be feasible. The test of feasibility was whether or not the value of the real estate of the current location could support the cost of relocation. It was determined that the cost of relocating the prison far exceeded the value that could be realized from the sale of the Draper prison site. However, on August 19, 2015, a special session of the state legislature voted to move the prison to the west side of Salt Lake City. The prison is now closed. The Point is a planned 600-acre mixed use development that is being constructed at the site of the prison.

== Facility ==
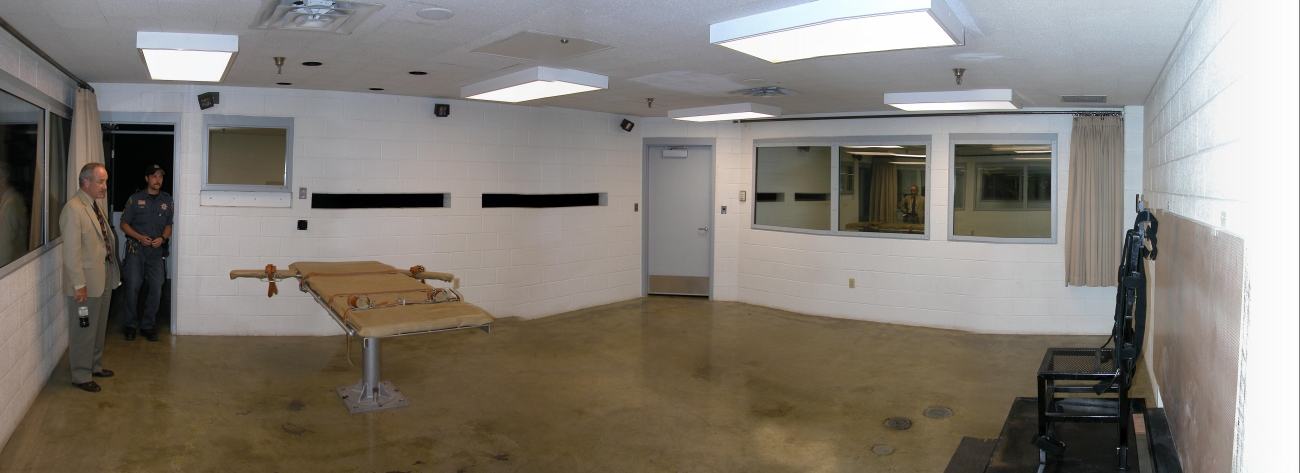
Execution chamber

The large prison complex housed both male and female prisoners in separate units. The prison had a capacity of over 4,000 inmates. The Draper site was located near Point of the Mountain along the Traverse Ridge and consists of several units named after surrounding mountains and mountain ranges. These units range from minimum security to supermax. The Uintas housed maximum security units for male inmates and included a supermax facility and execution chamber. Wasatch and Oquirrhs housed the medium security male inmates. Promontory was a medium security therapeutic community designed to treat drug abusers. Timpanogos housed female inmates and Olympus was the mental health unit. Lone Peak was a minimum security unit.

Scott P. Evans Architect & Associates designed the five buildings of the evaluation facility. The same company performed a reroof and a seismic upgrade of the SSD building.

== Notable inmates ==
- Michael Anthony Archuleta, convicted in the 1988 murder of Gordon Church. He has chosen to be executed by lethal injection.
- Ted Bundy, serial killer, was sentenced to 15 years in the Utah State Prison in 1976, but was extradited to Colorado to face other murder charges.
- Nick Clatterbuck, convicted of the February 28, 1984 murders of his foster parents.
- Ray Dempsey Gardner, serial killer, executed in 1951.
- Ronnie Lee Gardner, convicted in 1985 of murder and executed by firing squad on June 18, 2010.
- Gary Gilmore was executed by firing squad at the Utah State Prison in 1977. He was the first prisoner legally put to death in the United States since a U.S. Supreme Court ruling that ended a 1972 moratorium on capital punishment.
- Thomas Arthur Green, a convicted bigamist and noted practicing polygamist, served his sentences here. He was released in the summer of 2007.
- Mark Hofmann, convicted for murder and forgery, is currently incarcerated at the Central Utah Correctional Facility in Gunnison.
- Warren Jeffs, president of the Fundamentalist Church of Jesus Christ of Latter Day Saints, was incarcerated at the Utah State Prison. However, he is now serving a life sentence for sex crimes in Texas.
- Wanda Barzee, one of Elizabeth Smart's kidnappers transferred from Federal Medical Center, Carswell in 2016, released in 2018.
- Troy Kell, convicted for murder after stabbing an inmate 67 times in the Central Utah Correctional Facility in 1994 and sentenced to death. He has chosen to be executed by firing squad.
- Barton Kay Kirkham, convicted of murder and the last inmate to be executed by hanging in the state of Utah, in 1958.
- Nathan Martinez, convicted of the October 1994 murder of his stepmother and half-sister. Paroled in 2018.
- Ralph Leroy Menzies, convicted in 1988 of the 1986 robbery-murder of Maurine Hunsaker. Died in 2025 before execution.
- James W. Rodgers, convicted for murder and the last inmate to be executed by firing squad in the United States in 1960, before a de facto national moratorium on capital punishment was enacted with the U.S. Supreme Court decision of Furman v. Georgia.
- Frances Schreuder, convicted in 1983 of first degree murder in the 1978 death of her father, Franklin Bradshaw, using her son Marc.
- Marc Schreuder, convicted in 1982 of second degree murder in the 1978 death of his grandfather, Franklin Bradshaw, whom his mother, Frances Schreuder, induced him to kill. Marc served 12 years until his release in 1994.
- John Albert Taylor, executed by firing squad in 1996 for the 1988 rape and strangulation of an 11-year-old girl.
- Dale Selby Pierre and William Andrews, the Hi-Fi murderers.
- Megan Huntsman, serial killer, who murdered six of her own infant children and was sentenced to 5 years-to-life in prison on six counts, with three counts to be served consecutively, and three counts to be served concurrently.

== See also ==
- List of Utah state prisons
- Utah Department of Corrections
- Capital punishment in Utah
