= Mark Hofmann =

American murderer who forged Mormon documents

- Born: Mark William Hofmann; December 7, 1954 (age 71); Salt Lake City, U.S.
- Other name: Mike Hansen
- Citizenship: American
- Education: Utah State University
- Occupations: Document dealer and forger
- Years active: 1985
- Employer: Previously self-employed
- Known for: Serial bomber
- Spouse: Doralee "Dorie" Olds (m. 1979; div. 1987)
- Children: 4
- Parent(s): William Hofmann; Lucille Sears
- Status: Imprisoned
- Motive: Covering up forgeries
- Convictions: 2 x Second-degree murder 1 x Theft by deception 1 x Fraud (pleaded guilty January 7, 1987)
- Criminal charges: First-degree murder Delivery/construction of bombs Communications fraud Theft by deception Unregistered firearm violation
- Penalty: Life imprisonment
- Time at large: 3 months

Details
- Date: October 15, 1985
- Country: United States
- Locations: Salt Lake City, Utah
- Killed: 2
- Injured: 2 (including himself)
- Weapon: Bombs
- Date apprehended: January 1986
- Imprisoned at: Central Utah Correctional Facility

Mark William Hofmann (born December 7, 1954) is an American counterfeiter, forger, serial bomber and convicted murderer. Widely regarded as one of the most accomplished forgers in history, Hofmann is especially noted for his creation of fake documents related to the history of the Latter Day Saint movement. When his schemes began to unravel, he constructed bombs to murder three people in Salt Lake City, United States. The first two bombs killed two people on October 15, 1985. On the following day, a third bomb exploded in Hofmann's car. He was arrested for the bombings three months later, and in 1987 pled guilty to two counts of second-degree murder, one count of theft by deception, and one count of fraud.

== Early life ==
Mark Hofmann was born in 1954 in Salt Lake City, United States, to Lucille (née Sears) and William Hofmann (1928–1993). He was raised in the Church of Jesus Christ of Latter-day Saints (LDS Church). (Note: That his grandmother "was the product of a polygamous Mormon union sixteen years after the 1890 church manifesto abolishing polygamy ... was a secret that members of Mark's family seldom discussed.") He was a below-average student at Olympus High School, but had many hobbies including stage magic, electronics, chemistry, and stamp and coin collecting. Hofmann and his friends were said to have made bombs for fun on the outskirts of Murray, Utah. Hofmann graduated 573 in a class of 700. According to Hofmann, while still a teenage coin collector, he forged a rare mint mark on a dime and was told by an organization of coin collectors that it was genuine. (Note: Hofmann decided that if experts said the coin was genuine, then it was genuine, and he was cheating no one to whom he sold it.)

Like many young men in the LDS Church, Hofmann volunteered to spend two years as an LDS missionary, and in 1973 the church sent him to its mission in Bristol, England. Hofmann told his parents that he had baptized several converts; he did not tell them that he had also perused Fawn M. Brodie's biography of Joseph Smith, No Man Knows My History. While in England, Hofmann enjoyed investigating bookshops and buying early Mormon material, as well as books critiquing Mormonism. He later told prosecutors that he had lost his faith in the LDS Church and become an atheist around age 14. He had learned that his maternal grandparents had continued to secretly practice polygamy for more than a decade after the church publicly ended the practice. A former girlfriend believed Hofmann performed his mission only because of social pressure and the desire not to disappoint his parents.

After Hofmann returned from his mission, he enrolled as a pre-med major at Utah State University. In 1979, he married Doralee "Dorie" Olds, and the couple eventually had four children. (Note: Hofmann was a "hands-on father ... who pushed strollers, changed diapers, and attended local ward meetings with a baby on his arm.") Dorie Olds Hofmann filed for divorce in 1987, two years after Hofmann's crimes came to light, and became co-founder of a holistic medicine company.

== Forgeries ==
=== Anthon Transcript forgery ===
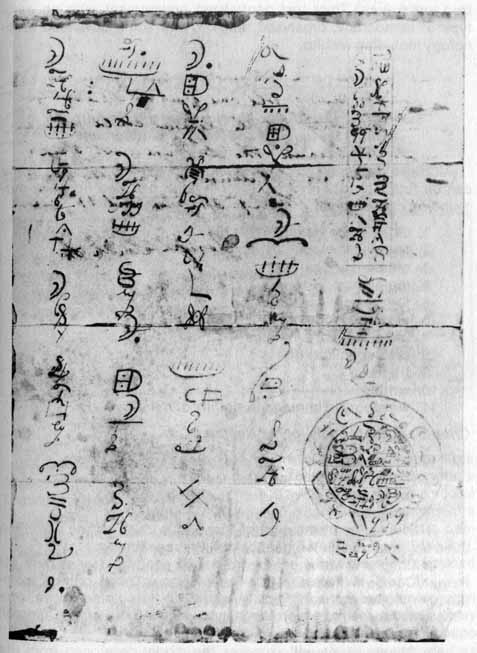
Hofmann forgery of Reformed Egyptian document, LDS archives. Note the columnar arrangement and the "Mexican Calendar" described by Anthon

In 1980, Hofmann claimed that he had found a 17th-century King James Bible with a folded paper gummed inside. The document seemed to be the transcript that Smith's scribe Martin Harris had presented to Charles Anthon, a Columbia classics professor, in 1828. According to Mormon scripture, the transcript and its unusual reformed Egyptian characters were copied by Smith from the golden plates from which he translated the Book of Mormon.

Hofmann constructed his version to fit Anthon's description of the document, and its discovery made Hofmann's reputation. Dean Jessee, a researcher well-versed in early Mormon manuscripts and historical documents in the Historical Department of the LDS Church, concluded that the document was a Smith holograph. The LDS Church announced the discovery of the Anthon Transcript in April and purchased it from Hofmann for more than $20,000. Appraised by the LDS Church for $25,000, it was purchased on October 13 in exchange for several artifacts the church owned in duplicate, including a $5 gold Mormon coin, Deseret banknotes, and a first edition of the Book of Mormon. Assuming the document to be genuine, prominent Mormon academic Hugh Nibley predicted that the discovery promised "as good a test as we'll ever get of the authenticity of the Book of Mormon" because he thought the paper might be translated. Zoology professor Barry Fell soon after claimed to have decoded the text.

Hofmann promptly dropped out of school and went into business as a dealer in rare books. He soon fabricated other historically significant documents and became noted among LDS Church history buffs for his "discoveries" of previously unknown materials pertaining to the Latter Day Saint movement. These deceived not only members of the First Presidency – notably Gordon B. Hinckley, then the de facto president of the church due to the poor health of more senior leaders (Note: "At seventy-two, Hinckley had begun filling the role that would increasingly dominate his life: His role as de facto president of the church.") – but also document experts and distinguished historians. (Note: Some LDS apologists dispute the fact that the church was deceived by Hofmann's forgeries. However, on October 18, 1995, after Hofmann's arrest, Hinckley said, "I frankly admit that Hofmann tricked us. ... We bought those documents only after the assurance that they were genuine. ... I am not ashamed to admit that we were victimized. It is not the first time the Church has found itself in such a position. Joseph Smith was victimized again and again. The Savior was victimized. I am sorry to say that sometimes it happens." Roger Launius writes, "Equally intriguing, why was the Mormon historical community so unwilling to accept the facts of the case and only reluctantly acknowledged that Hofmann was a murderer and that his documents were fakes? I suspect it has something to do with an unwillingness to admit that Hofmann had tricked them.") (Note: "Early in the investigation friends of Mark Hofmann and Steven Christensen repeatedly told the detectives that they had been present when Hofmann and Christensen received telephone calls from Gordon Hinckley. Toll records showed Hofmann placed several calls to Hinckley's office from his car telephone during the week before the bombings. ... But Hinckley spoke of Hofmann as if he barely recognized his name. Repeatedly when he was asked about the document, Hinckley answered: "I can't remember." As Simon Worrall has written, Hofmann "had fooled the most powerful men in the Mormon Church. ... They were seers, endowed with the power of discernment, who, according to the Book of Mormon could 'translate all records that are of ancient date'. Yet when Gordon B. Hinckley and the president of the Church, Spencer W. Kimball, had looked at the Anthon Transcript, they had been no more able to translate Hofmann's forged hieroglyphics than if they had been in Swahili. As Hofmann remembered how tears had come to their eyes, he felt a surge of sadistic pleasure.") According to Richard and Joan Ostling, Hofmann was by this time a "closet apostate" motivated not only by greed but also by "the desire to embarrass the church by undermining church history".

=== Joseph Smith III blessing ===
During the early 1980s, a significant number of new Mormon documents came into the marketplace. Sometimes the church received these as donations, and others it purchased. According to the Ostlings, "The church publicized some of the acquisitions; it orchestrated public relations for some that were known to be sensitive; others it acquired secretly and suppressed." (Note: "Gordon B. Hinckley, the second counselor in the First Presidency, largely handled policy in these matters and directed the public relations responses of the church.")

In 1981, Hofmann presented the LDS Church with a document which supposedly provided evidence that Smith had designated his son Joseph Smith III, rather than Brigham Young, as his successor. In a forged cover letter, purportedly written by Thomas Bullock and dated January 27, 1865, Bullock chastises Young for having all copies of the blessing destroyed. Bullock writes that although he believes Young to be the legitimate leader of the LDS Church, he would keep his copy of the blessing. Such a letter, if true, would portray Young and, by extension, the LDS Church, in an unfavorable light.

In February 1981, Hofmann tried to sell the letter to the chief archivist of the LDS Church. He expected the church to "buy the blessing on the spot and bury it." When the archivist balked at the price, Hofmann offered it to the Reorganized Church of Jesus Christ of Latter Day Saints (RLDS Church; now known as the Community of Christ), which had always claimed that the line of succession had been bestowed on Smith's descendants but had never had written proof. A scramble to acquire the document occurred, and Hofmann, posing as a faithful Mormon, presented it to his church in exchange for items worth more than $20,000. (Note: In 2011, it was revealed that Hofmann had tape-recorded himself pitching the bogus document to the RLDS Church archives.) Nevertheless, he also ensured that the document would be made public. The next day, a New York Times headline read, "Mormon Document Raises Doubts on Succession of Church's Leaders," and the LDS Church was forced to confirm the discovery and publicly present the document to the RLDS Church.

During the race by the Utah and Missouri churches to acquire the blessing document, Hofmann discovered "a lever to exercise enormous power over his church", a power to "menace and manipulate its leaders with nothing more sinister than a sheet of paper". Salt Lake County District Attorney's investigator Michael George believed that, after Hofmann had successfully forged the blessing, his ultimate goal was to create the lost 116 pages of the Book of Mormon, which he could have filled with inconsistencies and errors, sell them "to the church to be hidden away" and then – as he had done often with embarrassing documents – "make sure its contents were made public." (Note: "It was possible, George thought, that Hofmann could have destroyed Mormonism. Perhaps that is what he wanted to do – and to get rich at the same time.")

=== Salamander letter ===
Perhaps the most famous of Hofmann's Mormon forgeries, the Salamander letter, appeared in 1984. Supposedly written by Martin Harris to W. W. Phelps, the letter presented a version of the recovery of the gold plates that contrasted markedly with the church-sanctioned version of events. Not only did the letter intimate that Smith had been practicing "money digging" through magical practices, but it also replaced the angel that Smith said had appeared to him with a white salamander.

After the letter had been purchased for the church and became public knowledge, LDS Church apostle Dallin H. Oaks asserted to Mormon educators that the words "white salamander" could be reconciled with Smith's Angel Moroni because, in the 1820s, the word salamander might also refer to a mythical being thought to be able to live in fire, and a "being that is able to live in fire is a good approximation of the description Joseph Smith gave of the Angel Moroni."

In 1984, longtime critics of Mormonism Jerald and Sandra Tanner became the first to declare the Salamander letter a forgery, despite the fact that it, as well as others of Hofmann's purported discoveries, would have strengthened the Tanners' arguments against the veracity of official Mormon history. (Note: A visibly shaken Hofmann paid the Tanners a personal visit. "Why you of all people?" he asked.) Document expert Kenneth W. Rendell later said that while there was "the absence of any indication of forgery in the letter itself, there was also no evidence that it was genuine."

=== Other Mormon forgeries ===
No one is certain how many forged documents Hofmann created during the early 1980s, but they included a letter from Smith's mother, Lucy Mack Smith, describing the origin of the Book of Mormon; (Note: The LDS Church publicized this Hofmann creation through a press conference on August 23, 1982. The forgery was a letter complete with an 1828 Palmyra, New York, postmark. At the press conference, Dean Jessee asserted that a Hofmann forgery seemed authentic not only for Lucy Smith's handwriting but also for the period postmark and correct postage.) letters from Martin Harris and David Whitmer, two of the Three Witnesses, each giving a personal account of their visions; a contract between Smith and Egbert Bratt Grandin for the printing of the first edition of the Book of Mormon; and two pages of the original Book of Mormon manuscript taken in dictation from Smith to Oliver Cowdery.

In 1983, Hofmann bypassed the LDS Church's historical department and sold to Hinckley an 1825 Smith holograph purporting to confirm that Smith had been treasure hunting and practicing magic five years after his First Vision. Hofmann had the signature authenticated by Charles Hamilton, the contemporary "dean of American autograph dealers", sold the letter to the church for $15,000, and gave his word that no one else had a copy. Hofmann then leaked its existence to the press, after which the church was virtually forced to release the letter to scholars for study, despite previously denying it had it in its possession.

To make this sudden flood of important Mormon documents seem plausible, Hofmann explained that he relied on a network of tipsters, had methodically tracked down modern descendants of early Mormons, and had mined collections of 19th-century letters that had been saved by collectors for their postmarks rather than for their contents. Hofmann also traded in many legitimate historical documents acquired from rare book sellers and collectors. The forgeries were thus intermingled with many legitimate historical documents, which bolstered Hofmann's credibility.

=== Various forged Americana ===
In addition to documents from Mormon history, Hofmann also forged and sold signatures of many famous non-Mormons, including George Washington, John Adams, John Quincy Adams, Daniel Boone, John Brown, Andrew Jackson, Mark Twain, Nathan Hale, John Hancock, Francis Scott Key, Abraham Lincoln, John Milton, Paul Revere, Myles Standish, and Button Gwinnett, whose signature was the rarest, and therefore the most valuable, of any signer of the Declaration of Independence. Hofmann also forged a previously unknown poem in the hand of Emily Dickinson. (Note: Simon Worrall (2002) has written a book about the forged poem, which was sold by Sotheby's in 1997, long after Hofmann had been committed to prison.)

But Hofmann's grandest scheme was to forge what was perhaps the most famous missing document in American colonial history, the Oath of a Freeman. The one-page Oath had been printed in 1639, the first document to be printed in Britain's American colonies, but only about fifty copies had been made, and none of them were extant. A genuine example was probably worth over US$1 million in 1985, and Hofmann's agents began to negotiate a sale to the Library of Congress.

== Bombings ==
Despite the considerable amounts of money Hofmann had made from document sales, he was deeply in debt, in part because of his increasingly lavish lifestyle and his purchases of genuine first-edition books. (Note: For instance, Hofmann paid US$22,500 for a first edition of The Adventures of Sherlock Holmes to add to a collection he was building for his wife.) In an effort to clear his debts, he attempted to broker a sale of the "McLellin collection" – a supposedly extensive group of documents written by William E. McLellin, an early Mormon apostle who eventually broke with the LDS Church. Hofmann hinted that the McLellin collection would provide revelations unfavorable to the LDS Church. It was already known that McLellin had written various letters and papers dealing with controversial subjects in Joseph Smith's life; in 1879 the RLDS Church printed a letter from McLellin to Joseph Smith III stating that the elder Smith's wife, Emma, knew and disapproved of her husband's adultery. When McLellin was visited by this same Joseph Smith III, McLellin asserted: "Emma Smith told him [McLellin] that Joseph was both a polygamist and an adulterer."

However, Hofmann had no idea where the McLellin collection was, nor did he have the time to forge a suitably large group of documents. (Note: There actually were two surviving collections of McLellin papers, neither of which Hofmann knew of. One was discovered by a Salt Lake City reporter shortly after Hofmann was injured by his own bomb. McLellin described Joseph Smith "as a corrupt, even murderous dictator who seduced young girls under the guise of divine revelation" – but the documents were not as spectacularly anti-Mormon as Hofmann had implied. LDS Church archives also held McLellin journals, which had been institutionally forgotten and were not revealed to exist until after Hofmann's trial. Hofmann obtained, on consignment from document expert Kenneth W. Rendell, two pieces of a 2nd-century BCE Egyptian Book of the Dead, written on papyrus, which he then cut up and passed off as material from the McLellin collection.) Those to whom Hofmann had promised documents or repayments of debts began to hound him, and the sale of the Oath of a Freeman was delayed by questions about its authenticity. (Note: Hofmann had made two significant errors in his Oath, creating a version impossible to have been set in type.)

In an effort to buy more time, Hofmann began constructing bombs. On October 15, 1985, he first killed document collector Steven Christensen (as well as injuring a secretary in the leg with shrapnel). (Note: Steven Christensen was the son of a locally prominent clothier, Mac Christensen, founder of the Utah-area Mr. Mac clothing stores.) Later the same day, a second bomb killed Kathy Sheets, the wife of Christensen's former employer. (Note: On the afternoon following the bombings, Hofmann met with LDS Church apostle Dallin H. Oaks about the McLellin collection, a meeting which fellow document collector Brent Metcalfe believed had religious significance to Hofmann. "He's just killed two people. And what does he do? He goes down to the church office building and meets with Dallin Oaks. I can't even imagine the rush, given Hofmann's frame of reference, that this would have given him. To be standing there in front of one of God's appointed apostles, after murdering two people, and this person doesn't hear any words from God, doesn't intuit a thing. For Hofmann that must have been an absolute rush. He had pulled off the ultimate spoof against God.") As Hofmann had intended, police initially suspected that the bombings were related to the impending collapse of an investment business of which Sheets's husband, J. Gary Sheets, was the principal and Christensen his protégé.

The following day, Hofmann himself was severely injured when a bomb exploded in his Toyota MR2. He later claimed this was a suicide attempt, however this was disputed by prosecutors.

Although police quickly focused on Hofmann as the suspect in the bombings, some of his business associates went into hiding, fearing they might also become victims.

== Trial and sentencing ==
During the bombing investigation, police discovered evidence of the forgeries in Hofmann's basement. They also found the engraving plant where the forged plate for Oath of a Freeman was made. Document examiner George Throckmorton analyzed several Hofmann documents that had previously been deemed authentic and determined they were forgeries. Three letters purportedly written from an Illinois prison by Smith used different ink, paper, and writing instruments. Because the letters had been authenticated by different experts, the inconsistencies had earlier escaped detection. Throckmorton also discovered that some documents, supposedly written by different people, had similar writing styles and that they had been written with homemade iron gall ink that looked cracked like alligator skin under a microscope, although authentic period ink did not. Investigators also found that a poem used to authenticate the handwriting in the Salamander Letter had been forged by Hofmann and inserted in a Book of Common Prayer once owned by Martin Harris.

Hofmann was arrested in January 1986 and charged on four indictments totaling 27 counts, including first-degree murder, delivering a bomb, constructing or possessing a bomb, theft by deception, and communication fraud. A fifth indictment, containing an additional five counts of theft by deception, was added later in January. Hofmann initially maintained his innocence. However, at a preliminary hearing, prosecutors produced voluminous evidence of his forgeries and debts, as well as evidence linking him to the bombs. During the investigations, many of the prosecution team became convinced that they were being stonewalled by leaders of the LDS Church. Chief investigator Jim Bell said, "They're hiding something; the church is doing everything it can to make this as difficult as possible. I've never seen anything like this in a homicide investigation."

Hofmann not only faced the prospect of the death penalty in Utah but was indicted on federal charges of possession of an unregistered Uzi machine pistol. New York prosecutors also sought an indictment for the fraudulent sale of Oath of a Freeman. In January 1987, Hofmann pleaded guilty to two counts of second-degree murder, one count of theft by deception for forging the Salamander Letter, and one count of fraud for the bogus sale of the McLellin collection. The fact that Hofmann got off with a plea bargain instead of going to trial, where he would likely have faced the death penalty if found guilty, was quite puzzling to a reporter from the Los Angeles Times, who wrote, "In any other state, you'd see this thing go on trial, because that's how prosecutors' reputations are made. Going to trial and getting bad guys, big splashes, lots of exposure. Here you have a nice plea bargain."

Hofmann agreed to confess his forgeries in open court, in return for which prosecutors in Utah and New York dropped additional charges against him. He was sentenced to five years to life, but the judge recommended that Hofmann never be released. Utah has an indeterminate sentencing scheme. Prison sentences have a minimum and maximum time frame; offenders must serve their entire sentence unless the Utah Board of Pardons and Parole opts to grant them parole sooner. The five-years-to-life sentence was the minimum possible under Utah sentencing guidelines of the time; changes to sentencing guidelines have since increased the minimum sentence for murder to 15 years to life.

In 1988, Hofmann told the Board of Pardons that he thought planting the bomb that killed Kathy Sheets was "almost a game ... at the time I made the bomb, my thoughts were that it didn't matter if it was Mrs. Sheets, (Note: In Sillitoe's first edition of Salamander (1988), Hofmann is quoted as referring to Mr. Sheets, not Mrs. Sheets. It is also "Mr Sheets" in the taped testimony shown in Murder Among the Mormons (Netflix).) a child, a dog ... whoever" [was killed]. Within the hour the board, citing Hofmann's "callous disregard for human life", decided that he would indeed spend the remainder of his "natural life in prison". Hofmann also told investigator Michael George that he was bewildered by the attention paid to his murder victims: "I don't feel anything for them. My philosophy is that they're dead. They're not suffering. I think life is basically worthless. They could have died just as easily in a car accident. I don't believe in God. I don't believe in an afterlife. They don't know they're dead."

After Hofmann was imprisoned, he was excommunicated by the LDS Church and his wife filed for divorce. Hofmann attempted suicide in his cell by taking an overdose of antidepressants. He was revived, but not before spending twelve hours lying on his right arm and blocking its circulation, thus causing muscle atrophy. His forging hand was thereby permanently disabled. (Note: "The massive overdose of antidepressants he took soon after Dorie Olds filed for divorce [in 1987] left him lying unconscious for twelve hours on his prison cot with his right arm trapped under him. As a result of the blockage to his circulation, the muscles of his arm are atrophied. The forearm is withered almost to the bone.")

Hofmann, Utah Department of Corrections offender number 41235, was originally incarcerated at Utah State Prison in Draper. However, in 2016, he was transferred to Central Utah Correctional Facility in Gunnison.

== Influence ==
As a master forger, Hofmann deceived a number of renowned document experts during his short career. Some of his forgeries were accepted by scholars for years, and an unknown number of them may still be in circulation. (Note: 'Mark Hofmann was unquestionably the most skilled forger this country has ever seen,' said Charles Hamilton, a New York document dealer who is widely regarded as the nation's pre-eminent detector of forged documents. He was the first to determine that the widely publicized Hitler Diaries of several years ago were fakes. Mr. Hamilton said Mr. Hofmann 'perpetrated by far the largest monetary frauds through forgery that this country has ever had,' adding, 'He fooled me – he fooled everybody.') But it is Hofmann's forgeries of Mormon documents that have had the greatest historical significance. In August 1987, the sensationalist aspects of the Hofmann case led apostle Dallin H. Oaks to believe that church members had witnessed "some of the most intense LDS Church-bashing since the turn of the [20th] century."

A student of Mormonism, Jan Shipps, agreed that press reports "contained an astonishing amount of innuendo associating Hofmann's plagiarism with Mormon beginnings. Myriad reports alleged secrecy and cover-up on the part of LDS general authorities, and not a few writers referred to the way in which a culture that rests on a found scripture is particularly vulnerable to the offerings of con-artists."

According to the Ostlings, the Hofmann forgeries could only have been perpetrated "in connection with the curious mixture of paranoia and obsessiveness with which Mormons approach church history." After Hofmann's exposure, the LDS Church tried to correct the record, but the "public relations damage as well as the forgery losses meant the church was also a Hofmann victim." Robert Lindsey has also suggested that Hofmann "stimulated a burst of historical inquiry regarding Joseph Smith's youthful enthusiasm for magic [that] did not wither after his conviction". (Note: Subsequently, the LDS Church raised higher barriers to scholars' access to church archives. According to Lindsey, the Hofmann affair emboldened many scholars to penetrate deeper into Mormon history that its most conservative leaders wanted left unexplored, and that church leaders were unlikely to be able to fully contain the fires of intellectual curiosity that Hofmann helped fan. In contrast, Oaks argued that LDS Church policies restricting access to its archives were similar to those of other large archives such as the Huntington Library.)

== Portrayal in media ==
The murders were covered by a 1997 episode of Forensic Files, "Postal Mortem", and by the 1998 episode "Faith and Foul Play in Salt Lake City" of the series City Confidential.

Hofmann's crimes are fictionalized in the 2000 The X-Files episode "Hollywood A.D." and in the episode "The Saint", Law & Order: Criminal Intent (2004), where the forger is portrayed by Stephen Colbert.

A 2003 BBC documentary about Hofmann is entitled The Man Who Forged America. The same year, Canadian TV series Masterminds debuted with an episode on Hofmann's crimes.

The events were part of a 2010 episode of Who the (Bleep) Did I Marry?, "An Explosive Love".

A three-part documentary series about Hofmann's illegal activities, entitled Murder Among the Mormons, premiered on Netflix on March 3, 2021. The limited series debuted for the week ending March 7, 2021, as the third most streamed video on demand original-content program, according to Nielsen streaming ratings with 587 million viewer minutes.

== See also ==
- Crime in Utah
- Ted Kaczynski – American domestic terrorist (1942–2023)

== Sources ==
- interview with Simon Worrall on The Poet and the Murderer (video). Booknotes. C-SPAN. August 18, 2002.
- Lindsey, Robert (1988). A Gathering of Saints: A True Story of Money, Murder, and Deceit. Simon & Schuster. ISBN 0-671-65112-9.
- Naifeh, Steven; Smith, Gregory White (2005) [1988]. The Mormon Murders. St. Martin's Press. ISBN 0-312934-10-6.
- Oaks, Dallin (October 1987). "Recent events involving church history and forged documents". Ensign. Vol. 26. p. 63.
- Sillitoe, Linda; Roberts, Allen (1989). Salamander: The Story of the Mormon Forgery Murders (2nd. ed.). Salt Lake City: Signature Books. ISBN 0-941214-87-7.
- Sillitoe, Linda (1994), "Hofmann, Mark", Utah History Encyclopedia, University of Utah Press, ISBN 9780874804256, archived from the original on March 21, 2024
- Turley, Richard E (1992). Victims: The LDS Church and the Mark Hofmann case. Urbana: University of Illinois Press. ISBN 0-252-01885-0.
- Worrall, Simon (2002). The Poet and the Murderer: A True Story of Literary Crime and the Art of Forgery. New York: Dutton Adult Hardcover. ISBN 0-525-94596-2.
- "Fraudulent documents from Forger Mark Hofmann noted". Ensign. October 1987.
