= Central Utah Correctional Facility =

State prison in Gunnison, Utah, United States

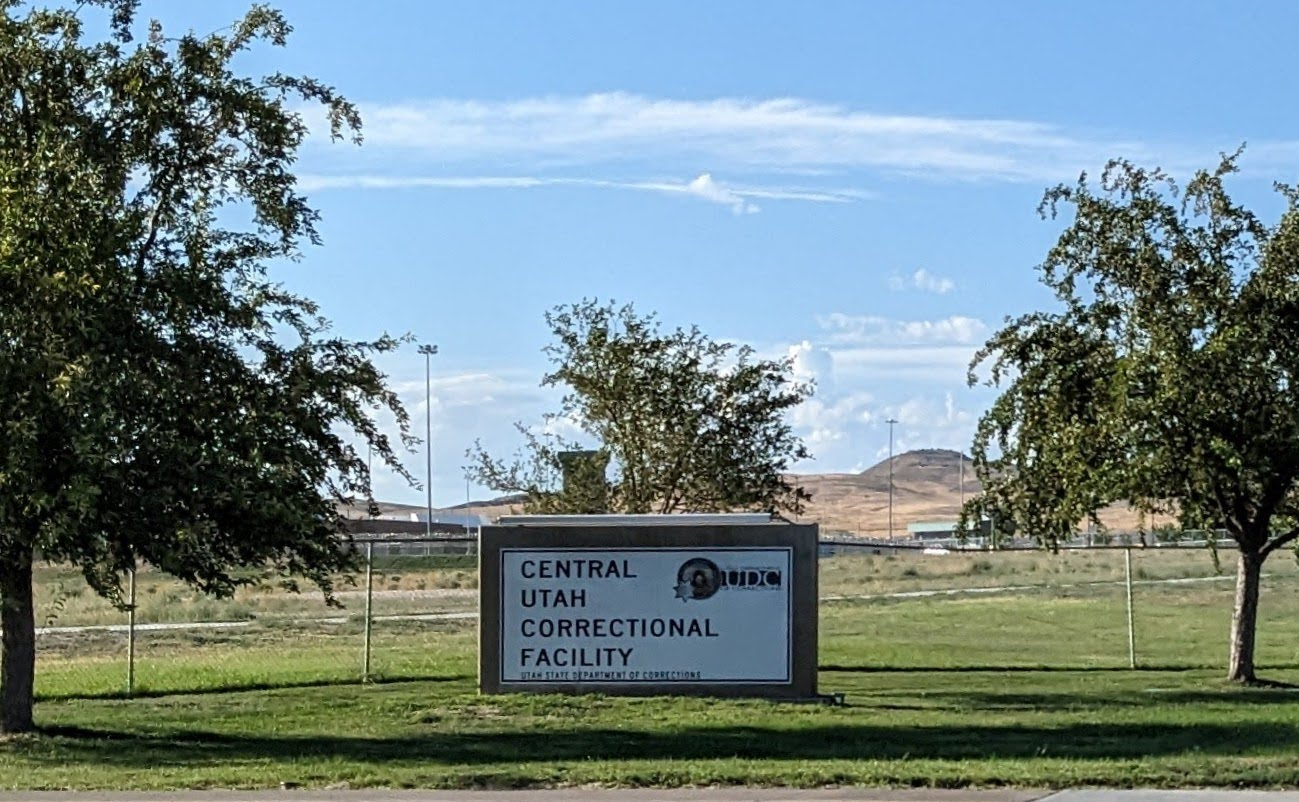
- Central Utah Correctional Facility
- Interactive map of Central Utah Correctional Facility
- Location: 255 East 300 North Gunnison, Utah United States; 39°9′54.92″N 111°48′38.15″W
- Status: Operational
- Capacity: 1,800
- Opened: 1990
- Managed by: Utah Department of Corrections
- Warden: 1990-1997 Frederick van der Veur; 1997-1999 Earl Hobby; 1999-2001 James Smith; 2001-2004 Gregory W. Jacquart; 2004-2006 Jerry Jorgenson

The Central Utah Correctional Facility (CUCF, also known as the Central Utah Correctional Facility - Gunnison Prison) is a prison in Gunnison, Utah, United States, that is one of two prisons managed by the Utah Department of Corrections' Division of Institutional Operations. The prison houses up to 1800 male inmates.

== Description ==
The prison was completed in 1990.

CUCF is composed of two main housing units: Henry and Boulder. Henry is broken up into four sections - Aspen, Birch, Cedar, and Dogwood (also called "SMU" for "Special Management Unit"). Boulder is divided into three buildings - Elm, Fir, Gale and Hickory. Aspen, Birch and Cedar house regular population inmates. Dogwood (SMU) is a short term housing unit intended for those in transport, those waiting to be moved into other sections, and those being punished. Elm houses some college students, but also contains "lock-down", or punishment, sections. Fir houses inmates who are either enrolled in or are waiting to begin the in-patient substance abuse treatment program "HOPE" (Helping Offenders Parole Effectively). Gale houses inmates who are part of the STRIVE (Success through Responsibility, Integrity, Values and Effort). Hickory is controlled, maximum security unit housing "level two" inmates.

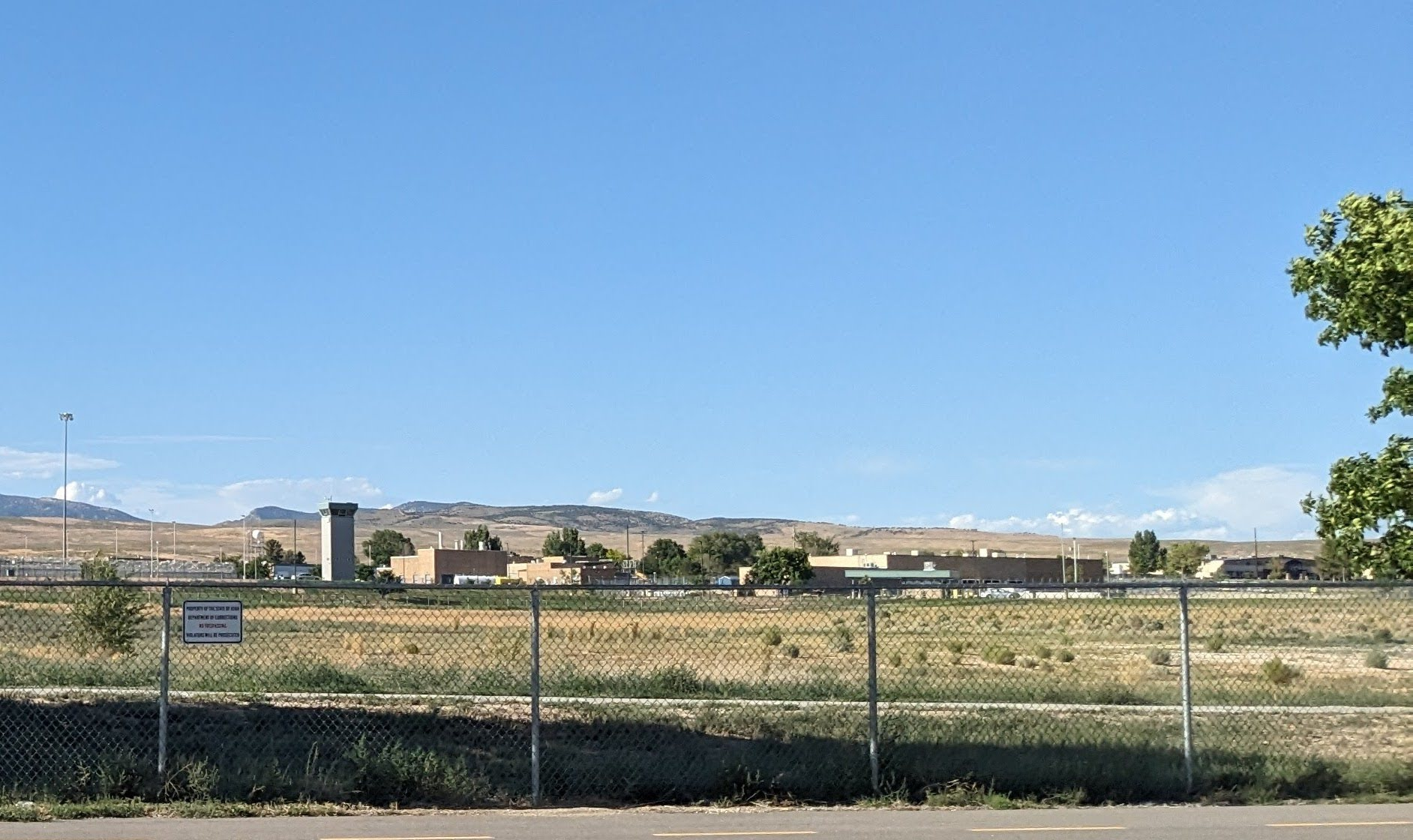
Central Utah Correctional Facility as viewed from US89.

The prison is used to house up to maximum security inmates. Unlike the Utah State Correctional Facility located in Salt Lake City, CUCF is located in a rural part of the state, and thus more isolated from the main population centers of Utah. The prison underwent an expansion concluding in 2008, adding 192 beds in the Hickory unit to meet the growing needs of Utah's offender population. The prison was again expanded in 2016, raising capacity to 1800.

== Notable inmates ==
Inmate	Number	Status	Description
Nick Clatterbuck	33368	5 years to life sentence	Murder
Edward Deli	52123	5 years to life	Murder
Mark Hacking	167809	5 years to life	Murder
Mark Hofmann	41235	life sentence	Murder, theft by deception, fraud
Douglas Kay	38746	5 years to life	Murder

== See also ==
- List of Utah state prisons
