= Murder of Lori Hacking =

2004 killing in Salt Lake City, Utah

Lori Soares Hacking
- Born: December 31, 1976; United States
- Died: July 19, 2004 (aged 27); Salt Lake City, Utah, U.S.
- Occupation: Stock broker's assistant
- Spouse: Mark Hacking (m. 1999)

Lori Kay Soares Hacking (December 31, 1976 – July 19, 2004) was a stock broker's assistant for Wells Fargo who was murdered by her husband Mark Douglas Hacking in 2004 in Salt Lake City, Utah. She was reported missing by her husband, and the search gained national attention before her husband confessed to the crime.

== Biography ==
Lori was the adopted daughter of Thelma and Eraldo Soares, formerly of Fullerton, California. Eraldo Soares was a Spanish and Portuguese teacher at Sunny Hills High School and was a native of Piracicaba, Brazil. He met Thelma when they both served as missionaries for the Church of Jesus Christ of Latter-day Saints (LDS Church) in Rio de Janeiro. Lori's parents divorced in 1987, and Thelma and Lori moved to Orem, Utah the following year. Lori and Mark both attended Orem High School, about 40 miles (about 64 kilometers) south of Salt Lake City.

=== Disappearance ===
At 10:49 a.m. on July 19, 2004, Mark Hacking called 911 to report his wife Lori missing. She was 27 years old at the time. Mark told police she had left home early for a customary jog in the Memory Grove and City Creek Canyon area northeast of downtown Salt Lake City, but had not returned home or arrived at work. A woman said she had seen Lori near the grove that day, but later withdrew her claim.

According to family members, Hacking was about five weeks pregnant when she vanished, and was planning a move to North Carolina, where her husband had said he would be starting medical school at the University of North Carolina at Chapel Hill (UNC). However, police determined Mark had lied to friends and family about his academic accomplishments, due in part to his failure to achieve similar professional status of his father and brother (both physicians) and another brother who was an electrical engineer. In fact, Mark had never completed his undergraduate degree at the University of Utah, and the medical school at UNC informed police they had no record of him being accepted or even applying.

Shortly after his wife's disappearance, Mark was found running naked through the streets, and was admitted to hospital for mental evaluation. While in the hospital, Mark engaged D. Gilbert Athay, a prominent defense attorney in the community.

=== Mark Hacking arrested ===
On August 2, 2004, Mark was arrested on suspicion of the aggravated murder of his wife. Police said they believed that he acted alone, killing Lori in their apartment with a .22-caliber rifle while she was asleep and disposing of her body in a dumpster.

Investigators found blood in several places in the couple's apartment, including on a knife found in the bedroom, on the headboard of the bed, and in Lori's car.

In addition, Scott and Lance Hacking, Mark's brothers, claimed that Mark confessed to murdering his wife after they confronted him on July 24, 2004. First-degree murder charges were filed against Mark Hacking on August 9, 2004.

On October 1, 2004 at approximately 8:20 a.m. searchers found human remains in the Salt Lake County landfill. By that afternoon, police had confirmed that the remains were those of Lori Hacking. Searchers found the carpet that Mark admitted to rolling her body into before placing it in the dumpster.

On October 29, 2004, Mark pleaded not guilty to first-degree murder despite pleas from Paul Soares, the victim's brother, to "save your family the grief and cost [and] plead guilty to murder."

According to investigators, on the night of July 18, Lori wrote Mark a note telling him that she planned to leave him after discovering that virtually everything Mark had told her about his background was false. She had learned that he never graduated from the University of Utah and never applied to medical school. Rather than divorce, Hacking killed her.

=== Guilty plea ===
Mark Douglas Hacking
- Born: April 24, 1976 (age 50); United States
- Spouse: Lori Soares (m. 1999; died 2004)
- Status: Utah Department of Corrections number 167809
- Conviction: April 15, 2005 (pleaded guilty)
- Criminal charges: First-degree murder
- Penalty: Life with 30 years minimum; earliest possible release 2035

Details
- Imprisoned at: Central Utah Correctional Facility in Gunnison, Utah

On April 15, 2005, Hacking pleaded guilty to first-degree murder in exchange for prosecutors dropping other charges. On June 6, 2005, Hacking was sentenced to six years to life in prison, the maximum possible sentence under Utah law at the time. In Utah, prison sentences are indeterminate, with a minimum and maximum time frame. The offender must serve the entire sentence unless the Utah Board of Pardons releases him sooner. Normally, those convicted of first-degree murder were required to serve a minimum of five years before they can be considered for parole. However, because Hacking killed Lori with a firearm, the minimum was increased by one year.

In July 2005, the Utah Board of Pardons declared that Mark Hacking would not be considered for parole until at least 2035, meaning that Hacking will have to serve a minimum of 30 years in prison. Board chairman Mike Sibbett stressed that a hearing was not a guarantee of a release date. He stated that there were a number of aggravating factors in Hacking's case that merited a later date. He stressed that Hacking obstructed justice by disposing of Lori's body and falsely claiming she was missing. Upon hearing this news, Lori's mother Thelma Soares issued this statement: "While it is a terrible waste of his life, [the decision] lifts a great burden from my mind and heart. The six-year minimum imposed by law is an insult not only to Lori and the baby, but to me and my family as well. I thank the members of the State Board of Pardons and Parole for their diligence and sense of justice in dealing with this tragic case. My faith in our justice system has been upheld."

=== Afterward ===
The Soares family removed the name Hacking from Lori's headstone. "We just felt that Mark obviously didn't want her anymore", said her mother. Lori's married name was replaced with the Portuguese word filhinha, which translates to "little daughter."

The initial sentence caused a widespread public outcry, with many expressing alarm at the possibility Hacking could be released after six years. Sibbett noted that most inmates convicted of murder have to wait between 18 and 35 years for a parole hearing, and Hacking's actions pushed it to "the higher level" of the spectrum. According to the Deseret News, the great majority of inmates convicted of murder serve far more than the five-year minimum, and it is unheard of for a convicted murderer to serve less than 15 years. Several are denied parole and forced to wait 22 years for another hearing, while others receive parole dates that require them to serve an average of 20 more years before being released. A few have been ordered to spend the rest of their lives in prison. Nonetheless, Paul Boyden, the executive director of the Utah Statewide Association of Prosecutors, urged the Utah Sentencing Commission to raise the minimum sentence for first-degree murder to 15 years. Boyden said most people didn't understand Utah's indeterminate sentencing scheme and added that it caused "a public perception problem" for the state. State sentencing commission member Sy Snarr agreed, saying that it was "appalling" that Hacking even theoretically had a minimum six-year sentence. On March 20, 2006, Utah House Bill 102, also known as "Lori's Law", was signed into law. It stipulates that people convicted of first-degree murder in Utah must serve at least 15 years before they can be considered for parole.

On June 6, 2005, Mark Hacking's father read a statement from his family that he said would be their final statement to the press about the murder. The statement clarified several events leading to Mark's confession and conviction. The statement ended by quoting Mark:

"I know prison is where I need to be. I will spend my time there doing all I can to right the many wrongs I have done, though I realize complete atonement is impossible in this life. I have a lot of healing and changing to do, but I hope that some day I can become the man Lori always thought I was. To the many people I have hurt, I am more sorry than you could ever know. Every day my soul burns in torment when I think of what you must be going through. I wish I could take away your pain. I wish I could take back all the lies I have told and replace them with the truth. I wish I could put Lori back into your arms. My pain is deserved; yours is not. From the bottom of my heart, I beg for your forgiveness. There is no such thing as a harmless lie no matter how small it is. You may think a lie only hurts the liar, but this is far from the truth. If you are traveling a path of lies, please stop now and face the consequences. Whatever those consequences, they will be better than the pain you are causing yourself and others."

In June 2006, prison officials in Utah discovered that Hacking was selling personal items, including autographs, a hand tracing, various prison forms, and magazines, on an online site called Murder Auction. Officials later announced that Hacking had agreed to discontinue selling anything online.

Hacking, Utah Department of Corrections offender number 167809, is incarcerated at Central Utah Correctional Facility in Gunnison, Utah.

== Media ==
A dramatization of the murder of Lori Hacking was televised by an Escape series, produced by Bellum Entertainment Group, true crime episode of Corrupt Crimes: "Deadly Rampage at Fort Hood", S1 E104, aired: 12 July 2016. The story was featured as the first episode in the television series A Lie to Die For on Oxygen.

The true crime podcast Sword and Scale details Lori's story in its 29th episode.

In 2014, season 2 of My Dirty Little Secret aired an episode about the murder of Lori Hacking.

== See also ==
- Susan Powell – a woman from a Salt Lake City suburb who disappeared in 2009, and is believed to have been murdered. Her husband and presumed killer, Joshua Powell, later killed himself and their two sons in 2012. Incidentally, both Susan Powell and Lori Hacking had been employed by Wells Fargo Investments at the time of their respective disappearances, with some colleagues knowing both women.
- Laci and Conner Peterson – Laci went missing while pregnant in 2002. Her husband Scott Peterson was convicted of murdering Laci and their unborn child, Conner, and sentenced to death. Laci is buried under her maiden name.
- Drew Peterson – convicted of killing his third wife, Kathleen Savio, and is suspected of killing his fourth, Stacy Ann Peterson.
- Charles Stuart – killed his wife and unborn son, Carol and Christopher DiMaiti, and shot himself, but blamed the assault on an African-American assailant. Both victims are buried under Carol's maiden name.
- John Sharpe – killed his pregnant wife Anna Kemp, daughter Gracie, and unborn son. He was given three life sentences while his victims were buried under Anna's maiden name.
- Murders of Rachel and Lillian Entwistle
- Watts family murders
