= Norman Newsted =

American convicted spree killer

- 1984 photo of Norman Newsted
- Born: May 5, 1954; Las Vegas, Nevada, U.S.
- Died: July 8, 1999 (aged 45); Oklahoma State Penitentiary, Oklahoma, U.S.
- Status: Executed by lethal injection
- Convictions: Oklahoma; First degree murder Utah; First degree murder (3 counts)
- Penalty: Oklahoma; Death; Utah; Life imprisonment

Details
- Victims: 4
- Date: February 14–20, 1984
- Country: United States
- Locations: Oklahoma and Utah
- Imprisoned at: Oklahoma State Penitentiary

Norman Lee Newsted (Note: Also spelt as Norman Newstead.) (May 5, 1954 – July 8, 1999) was an American convicted spree killer who murdered a total of four people in both Oklahoma and Utah in 1984. In the Utah case, Newsted and an accomplice named Douglas Kay robbed and killed three people at a local bar in Cedar City, Utah, while for the Oklahoma case, Newsted robbed and murdered a taxi driver named Larry Donnell Buckley in Tulsa. Newsted was arrested for all the four murders and charged in both jurisdictions. Newsted and Kay were both sentenced to life imprisonment for the Cedar City triple murder, while for the murder of Buckley, only Newsted was tried and he was sentenced to death and executed on July 8, 1999, by lethal injection at the Oklahoma State Penitentiary.

== Early life ==
Born in Las Vegas, Nevada, on May 5, 1954, Norman Lee Newsted's early life was marked by profound instability, abuse, and neglect. He was born to an alcoholic mother who continued drinking throughout her pregnancy, potentially subjecting him to the harmful effects of prenatal alcohol exposure. His home environment was further destabilized by a father who drank heavily and was both physically and sexually abusive—particularly toward Newsted's sister. Amid this abusive and chaotic upbringing, Newsted ran away from home at the age of 13 and began using drugs around the same time. His troubled adolescence continued as he dropped out of school at 16. Despite his limited education and unresolved psychological trauma, he married at 18 and took on the responsibility of supporting two children by working a series of jobs. This deeply troubled and turbulent background was later cited as potential mitigating evidence that his defense failed to present during the penalty phase of his murder trial.

== Murders ==
=== Cedar City triple murder ===
On February 14, 1984, less than 60 days after he was released from prison, 29-year-old Norman Newsted, together with his accomplice Douglas Edward Kay, committed a triple murder in Cedar City, Utah.

On that date itself, Newsted and Kay, who were both armed with guns and accompanied by Cynthia Brosemer, entered the Playhouse Bar at Cedar City, and attempted to commit firearm robbery. Two male patrons and a female employee were all shot dead by both Newsted and Kay, the latter who reportedly fired the fatal shots execution-style at the three victims, identified as 23-year-old barmaid Patricia Frei, and customers Robert Bull (33 years old) and Ronald B. Schmid (24 years old).

After the murders, the men went their separate ways, and Kay, who was accompanied by the pair's female companion, headed to Las Vegas, Nevada. The 25-year-old woman, who reportedly feared that the men might make her shoulder the blame for the murders, eventually chose to give up the location of Kay to the police, in exchange for immunity; another female travel companion of the trio, who was absent from the crime scene, was also granted immunity. This led to the arrest of Kay, but at that point in time, Newsted remained at large for the murders.

=== Murder of Larry Donnell Buckley ===
On February 20, 1984, six days after the Cedar City murders, Newsted committed his fourth and final murder in Tulsa, Oklahoma.

After fleeing Utah, Newsted boarded a flight to Oklahoma and arrived at Tulsa International Airport, and hailed a taxi driven by Lawrence "Larry" Donnell Buckley. Intending to rob Buckley, Newsted first directed Buckley to drive him to his sister's house, pretending that he wanted to go there. However, after failing to locate the address, Buckley stopped at a gas station to ask for directions. At the station itself, Newsted bought a beer and Buckley bought a pack of cigarettes, although the clerk noticed that Newsted did not have money on him.

Afterwards, Buckley continued to drive Newsted to a local church, where Newsted telephoned his sister and informed her to fetch him. Afterwards, Newsted shot Buckley twice in the back of his head. Several witnesses in the area reportedly seen Newsted and Buckley together in the parking lot shortly before the fatal shooting, and some also heard the gunshot sounds.

== Trial and sentencing ==
=== Oklahoma ===
On February 21, 1984, Norman Newsted was arrested at his sister's home in Tulsa for the murder of Lawrence Buckley. Newsted was charged with the first-degree murder of Buckley by the Oklahoma authorities, and he officially pleaded not guilty to the offence.

In April 1984, the Utah authorities submitted an extradition request to Oklahoma, seeking to have Newsted tried for his role in the Cedar City triple murder. That same month, it was decided that Newsted shall stand trial first in Oklahoma for Buckley's murder, before he could be transferred to Utah for another trial pertaining to the Cedar City killings.

On June 25, 1984, a Tulsa County jury found Newsted guilty of first-degree murder for the death of Lawrence Buckley. A month later, on July 25, 1984, Newsted was sentenced to death via lethal injection by Associate Judge Mermon Potter upon the jury's unanimous recommendation for capital punishment.

=== Utah ===
After he was condemned to death row in Oklahoma, Newsted was extradited back to Utah to face trial for the 1984 Cedar City triple murder. Although Newsted filed a motion opposing his extradition, 9th Circuit Judge Christian Ronnow ruled that Newsted should be sent back to Utah to face trial, after determining that Newsted had voluntarily agreed to return to Utah for another murder trial on earlier occasions.

On November 1, 1985, an Utah state jury found Newsted guilty of all three counts of first-degree murder for the deaths of all three victims in the 1984 Cedar City case. Newsted ultimately waived his right to be sentenced by a jury, leaving it to the judge to decide between the death penalty or life imprisonment, which were the potential sentences for first-degree murder under Utah state law. Five days later, on November 6, 1985, Newsted was sentenced to three consecutive life sentences, thus escaping the possibility of additional death sentences for his killing spree. Subsequently, on May 1, 1988, the Utah Board of Pardons and Parole ordered that Newsted should be spending the rest of his natural life in prison without any chance of parole, in the event that his death sentence from Oklahoma was never carried out.

As for Kay, Newsted's accomplice in the triple murder, he was sentenced to life imprisonment for all three counts of first-degree murder, after his defence counsel reached a plea agreement with the prosecution, with the death penalty taken off the table as a condition. Ultimately, the Utah Board of Pardons and Parole decided that Kay would be serving his life sentences without the possibility of parole, in light of the extremely grave nature of the crimes. Reportedly, the families of the Cedar City murder victims were disappointed that Kay was not given capital punishment for the crime. Kay's appeal in 1986 was rejected by the Utah Supreme Court.

== Appeals and death row ==
On June 4, 1986, the Oklahoma Court of Criminal Appeals dismissed Norman Newsted's appeal.

After losing his direct appeal, Newsted's execution date was set for October 14, 1986, but on October 10, 1986, four days before he was due to be executed, the U.S. Supreme Court granted Newsted a stay of execution to allow him time to pursue further appeals.

On December 2, 1986, the U.S. Supreme Court dismissed Newsted's appeal and upheld his death sentence.

In 1990, Newsted and another death row inmate, Michael Nolte, were given disciplinary charges for stabbing a third prisoner, Henry Wesley Smith, while in prison; Smith survived the assault. Nolte was sentenced to death for a 1987 murder case but 26 years after the incident, Nolte was eventually exonerated and released after spending three decades in prison. Smith was also sentenced to death for murder, but a year after the stabbing, Smith's death sentence was commuted to life without parole.

On December 20, 1995, Newsted's appeal for post-conviction relief was denied by the Oklahoma Court of Criminal Appeals.

In 1997, a federal judge vacated the conviction and sentence of Newsted and ordered that he be released unless a new appeal could be granted by the state courts, after finding that Newsted was represented by ineffective counsel during his trial and his claims should be assessed. However, on October 15, 1998, the 10th Circuit Court of Appeals restored Newsted's death sentence and murder conviction, and overruled the lower court's ruling, stating that Newsted was not entitled to pursue a new appeal pertaining to his claims of ineffective counsel.

== Execution ==
On May 5, 1999, the Oklahoma Court of Criminal Appeals signed a death warrant for Newsted, scheduling him to be executed on July 8, 1999. Newsted appealed for clemency as a final resort to escape execution, but by a 3–1 vote, the Oklahoma Pardon and Parole Board denied clemency for Newsted. The U.S. Supreme Court also denied a stay of execution for Newsted hours before he was due to be executed.

On July 8, 1999, 45-year-old Norman Lee Newsted was put to death by lethal injection at the Oklahoma State Penitentiary, and the official time of death was 12:12am. Two of Buckley's brothers, two sisters, a brother-in-law and a family minister witnessed the execution, and the family released a media statement, expressing that their sadness would not lessen, but the execution of Newsted allowed them to finally seek closure and end the pain of losing a loved one years ago. The brother of one of the Cedar City triple murder victims, Ronald Schmid, told the media that the execution of his brother's killer stopped him from killing more people, and that no one else would go through the pain and grief of losing a family member like he did due to Newsted's actions. Cedar City Police Sergeant Roy Houchen also expressed that the execution of Newsted helped bring closure for him and the other police officers involved in the Cedar City triple murder investigation.

Newsted was reportedly the 100th person to be executed in the state of Oklahoma since the 1976 reinstatement of capital punishment in the United States. For his last meal, Newsted ordered five tacos, five doughnuts and a vanilla milkshake. On the eve of his execution, Newsted was moved to a solitary cell adjacent to the execution chamber, and he was granted access to a telephone, television and radio. On the same date Newsted was executed, another convicted murderer, Allen Lee Davis, was put to death by the electric chair in Florida for the murders of a pregnant woman and her two daughters.

Newsted was one of the few White criminals on death row to be executed for murdering African-American victims since 1976; the murdered taxi driver Buckley was African-American. It was extremely rare for White people to be sentenced to death for killing African-American people in the United States; a 2014 study revealed that Newsted was one of 16 White defendants to be executed for the murder of African-American victims, while about 230 African-American people were executed for killing White people, which highlighted the issue of racial disparity over capital punishment in the United States.

== See also ==
- Capital punishment in Oklahoma
- List of people executed in Oklahoma
- List of people executed in the United States in 1999
- List of white defendants executed for killing a black victim
