= Lone Peak Hotshots =

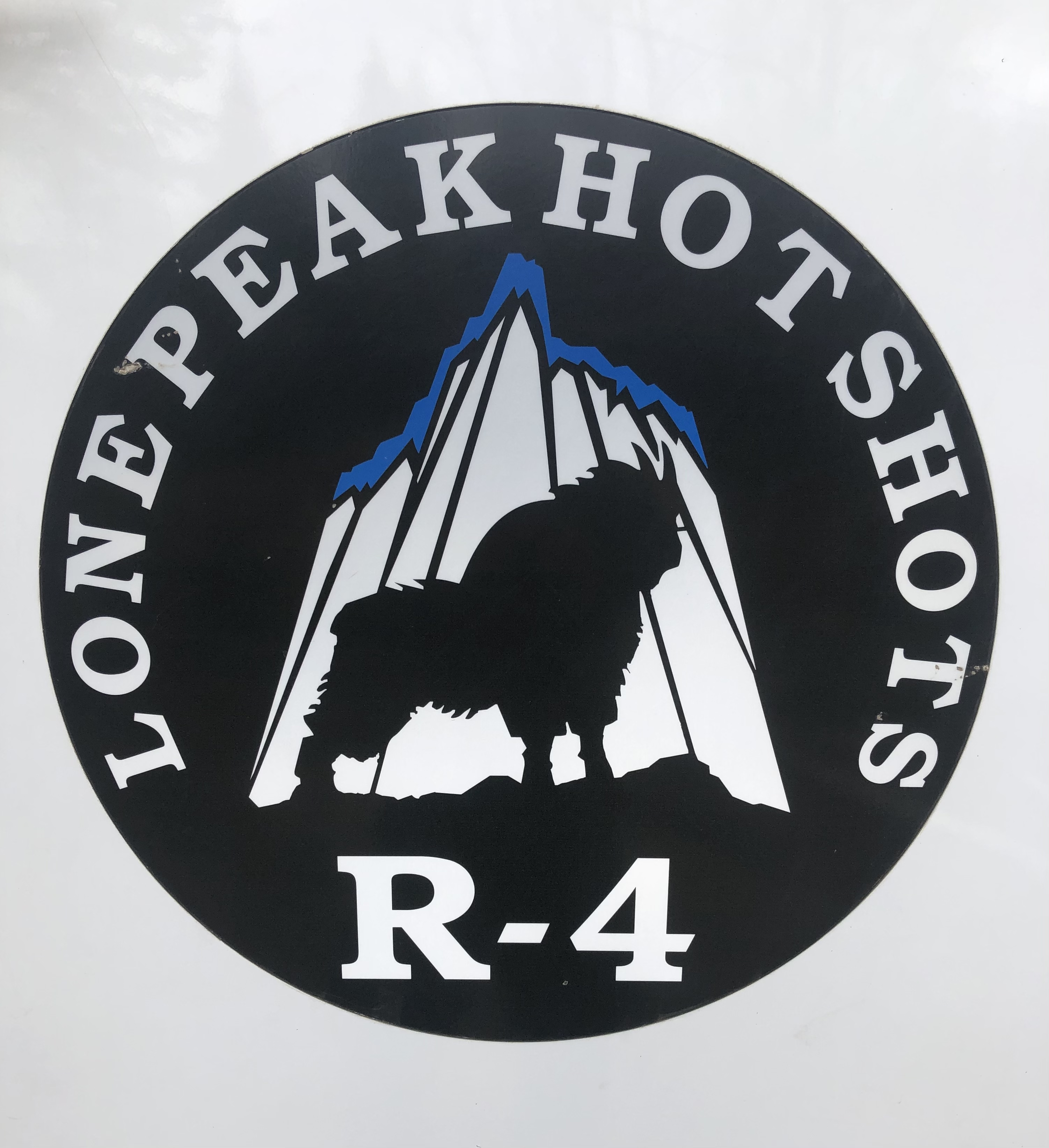
Lone Peak Hotshots crew logo

The Lone Peak Hotshots are an Interagency Hotshot Crew located in Draper, Utah in the United States. The crew consists of 23 firefighters 7 of which are permanent and 16 of which are seasonal. The Lone Peak Hotshots season typically begins in mid April and extends until late October.

== History ==
The Lone Peak Interagency Hotshot Crew was originally founded in 1991 as the Flame ‘N’ Go Hotshots. The Flame ‘N’ Go Hotshot Crew was composed of seventeen prisoners, two Utah Department of Forestry employees and two corrections officers from the Utah Department of Corrections. From 1991 until 1998 the Flame ‘N’ Go Hotshots operated as a regional hotshot crew. In 1998 the crew achieved status as a nationally recognized Type 1 Interagency Hotshot Crew. In 2001, the crew switched from a prison crew to the all civilian Lone Peak Hotshots. The Lone Peak Hotshots are one of only three non-federal Interagency Hotshot Crews in the United States. They were the first state-sponsored, Hotshot Crew in the country.

== Organization ==
The Lone Peak Hotshots are based out of the Lone Peak Conservation Center (LPCC), in Draper, Utah. The crew is hosted and sponsored by the Utah Department of Natural Resources (DNR), Division of Forestry, Fire, and State Lands (FFSL). The crew is located in the U.S. Forest Service Region IV.

The crew is spearheaded by one superintendent (Crew Boss) and is broken into two squads of eleven firefighters.

- One Superintendent
- Two Captains
- Two Squad Leaders
- Two Lead Firefighters
- Sixteen Seasonal Firefighters

== Operations ==
Today, the Lone Peak Hotshots focus primarily on wildfire suppression. During slow fire seasons the crew will assist with fuels reduction and other natural resources based projects known as “project work”. Lone Peak Hotshots must be nationally available for dispatch for at least 180 days of the year and seasonal crewmembers may work up to 365 days. Crewmembers are expected to be in excellent physical condition throughout the fire season and work an average of 150-160 days during a 6-month season.

== Fatalities ==
In August 2000, Flame ‘N’ Go Hotshots crew members Michael Bishop and Rodgie Braithwaite were killed by a lightning strike.

== See also ==
- Smokejumpers
- Helitack
- Aerial firefighting
- Great Fire of 1910
