= Utah Adult Probation & Parole =

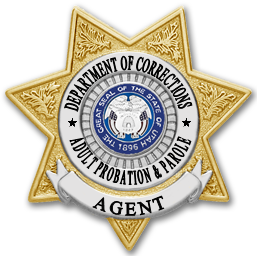
- Abbreviation: AP&P

Jurisdictional structure
- Operations jurisdiction: Utah, United States
- General nature: Local civilian police

Operational structure
- Headquarters: Draper, Utah
- Agency executives: Tim Kincaid, Division Director; Jared Garcia, Executive Director
- Parent agency: Utah Department of Corrections

Website
- UDC Website

Adult Probation and Parole (AP&P) is a division of the Utah Department of Corrections (UDC) which is a government agency dedicated to the management and supervision of convicted probationers and parolees in the State of Utah. It is led by the Division Director Tim Kincaid and is headquartered in the Utah Department of Corrections Administration Building in Draper.

AP&P supervises approximately 17,800 offenders in the community. Boundaries are divided into five regions. Each region within the division of AP&P has agents and correctional officers who perform a variety of functions in the courts and in the field. AP&P agents are certified law enforcement officers, and have statewide police authority. In addition to supervising offenders in the field, AP&P agents are responsible for preparing reports on offenders for District Courts and the Utah Board of Pardons and Parole, responding to threats on public safety, and assisting local agencies in joint operations.

== Community Correctional Center Facilities ==
Adult Probation and Parole formerly operated six residential community correctional centers in Utah for offenders who are on probation or who have recently paroled from prison. The management of these facilities moved to the Release and Reentry Division of the Utah Department of Corrections. These "halfway houses" are designed to help offenders who may not have a place to go when they leave prison, need additional treatment as they transition back into the community, or are struggling and at risk of returning to jail or prison.

Atherton Community Treatment Center (ACTC)

Formally known as Fremont, ACTC is one of two facilities devoted to helping women. The center began accepting clients on April 17, 2015, and is dedicated to helping women who have violated their supervision conditions and are at risk of being returned to jail or prison.

Bonneville (BCCC)

This center opened in the 1980s and works to stabilize and transition mentally ill and sex offender parolees into the community.

Fortitude Treatment Center (FTC)

FTC houses parolees who have been released from the prison and are in need of help transitioning into the community. It's also dedicated to helping men who have violated their parole and are at risk of being return to prison.

Northern Utah Correctional Center (NUCCC)

NUCCC houses parolees who have been released from the prison and are in need of help to transition into the community. This facility is located in the Ogden area.

Orange Street (OCCC)

OCCC is the other facility dedicated to helping women who have been released from prison and are in need to help transitioning into the community.

Timpanogos Community Treatment Center (CTC)

Timpanogos is the first CCC opened south of Salt Lake City, and is located in Utah County.

== Adult Probation and Parole regions and offices ==
Adult Probation and Parole is divided into five regions, and those regions are further divided into region offices. Many agents work with local police departments and rotate working out of the many police and sheriff offices throughout the state.

Northern Region has offices in Brigham City (Box Elder County), Farmington (Davis County), Logan (Cache and Rich counties), and Ogden (Morgan and Weber counties). Ogden is generally identified as the head office for the region.

Region III has offices in Salt Lake (Salt Lake and Summit counties) and Tooele (Tooele county).

Region IV has offices in Provo (Utah and Wasatch counties) and Richfield (Garfield, Juab, Millard, Piute, Sanpete, Sevier and Wayne County - west half - counties), with Provo being the head office for this region.

Region V has offices in Hurricane (Kane and Washington counties) and Cedar City (Beaver and Iron counties), with Hurricane being the head office for this region.

Region VI has offices in Price (Carbon, Emery and east-half of Wayne counties), Vernal (Daggett and Uintah counties), Roosevelt (Duchesne County), and Moab (Grand San Juan counties), with Price being the head office for this region.

Through the state, Adult Probation and Parole works with Local Law Enforcement to communicate with, and manage the number of individuals on probation and parole.

This is a map to help visualize the break down of the regions. Adult Probation and Parole region map

In 2026 the AP&P introduced electronics-sniffing K9s to the team.

Two AP&P agents were recognized for their bravery in April 2026 when they saved two men they discovered unconscious due to carbon monoxide poisoning in Carbon County.

== Controversies ==
In May 2023, after only two years on the job, the Executive Director of the Utah Department of Corrections announced his retirement the day after he was named in a civil lawsuit accusing the department of failing to properly supervise violent parolees.

In October of 2025, a longtime agent for AP&P was arrested on charges of soliciting inappropriate photos and videos from a female offender he was supervising. The two claimed to be in a relationship.

== See also ==
- List of Parole Boards in the United States
