= List of law enforcement agencies in Utah =

List of law enforcement agencies in the U.S. state of Utah

This is a list of law enforcement agencies in the state of Utah.

According to the US Bureau of Justice Statistics' 2008 Census of State and Local Law Enforcement Agencies, the state had 136 law enforcement agencies employing 4,782 sworn police officers, about 175 for each 100,000 residents.

== State agencies ==
- Utah Department of Corrections
  - Utah Adult Probation & Parole
- Utah Department of Human Services
  - Division of Juvenile Justice Services
- Utah Department of Natural Resources
  - Utah Division of State Parks and Recreation
    - Park Rangers
  - Utah Division of Wildlife Resources
    - Conservation Officers
- Utah Attorney General and Assistant Attorneys General
- Utah Department of Public Safety
  - Liquor Enforcement Section
  - Utah State Fire Marshal
  - Utah Highway Patrol
  - Utah State Bureau of Investigation
- Utah Department of Transportation - Motor Carrier Safety - Port of Entry
- Utah Division of Insurance Fraud
- Utah State Tax Commission - Motor Vehicle Enforcement Division (MVED)
- Utah State Hospital - Campus Police

== County agencies ==
- Beaver County Sheriff's Office
- Box Elder County Sheriff's Office
- Cache County Sheriff's Office
- Carbon County Sheriff's Office
- Daggett County Sheriff's Office
- Davis County Sheriff's Office
- Duchesne County Sheriff's Office
- Emery County Sheriff's Office
- Garfield County Sheriff's Office
- Grand County Sheriff's Office
- Iron County Sheriff's Office
- Juab County Sheriff's Office
- Kane County Sheriff's Office
- Millard County Sheriff's Office
- Morgan County Sheriff's Office
- Piute County Sheriff's Office
- Rich County Sheriff's Office
- Salt Lake County Sheriff's Office
- San Juan County Sheriff's Office
- Sanpete County Sheriff's Office
- Sevier County Sheriff's Office
- Summit County Sheriff's Office
- Tooele County Sheriff's Office
- Uintah County Sheriff's Office
- Unified Police Department of Greater Salt Lake
- Utah County Sheriff's Office
- Wasatch County Sheriff's Office
- Washington County Sheriff's Office
- Wayne County Sheriff's Office
- Weber County Sheriff's Office

== City agencies ==
- Alta Marshal's Office
- Aurora Police Department
- American Fork Police Department
- Blanding Police Department
- Bluffdale Police Department
- Bountiful Police Department
- Brigham City Police Department
- Cedar City Police Department
- Centerville Police Department
- Clearfield Police Department
- Clinton Police Department
- Cottonwood Heights Police Department * Colorado City/Hilldale Police Department
- Draper Police Department
- East Carbon Police Department
- Enoch Police Department
- Ephraim City Police Department
- Escalante Police Department
- Farmington Police Department
- Grantsville Police Department
- Gunnison Police Department
- Harrisville Police Department
- Heber City Police Department
- Helper Police Department
- Herriman Police Department
- Hurricane Police Department
- Hyrum Police Department
- Kamas Police Department
- Kanab Police Department
- Kaysville Police Department
- La Verkin Police Department
- Layton Police Department
- Lehi Police Department
- Lindon Police Department
- Logan Police Department
- Lone Peak Police Department
- Mantua Police Department
- Mapleton Police Department
- Minersville Marshal's Office
- Moab Police Department
- Monticello Police Department
- Moroni Police Department
- Murray Police Department
- Myton Police Department
- Naples Police Department
- Nephi Police Department
- North Ogden Police Department
- North Salt Lake Police Department
- Ogden Police Department
- Orem Department of Public Safety
- Park City Police Department
- Parowan Police Department
- Payson Police Department
- Perry Police Department
- Pleasant Grove Police Department
- Pleasant View Police Department
- Price Police Department
- Provo Police Department
- Richfield Police Department
- Riverdale Police Department
- Riverton Police Department
- Roosevelt Police Department
- Roy Police Department
- Salina Police Department
- Salem Police Department
- Salt Lake City Police Department
- Sandy Police Department
- Santaquin Police Department
- Saratoga Springs Police Department https://www.saratogaspringscity.com/
- Smithfield Police Department
- South Jordan Police Department
- South Ogden Police Department
- South Salt Lake Police Department
- Spanish Fork Police Department
- Springdale Police Department
- Springville Police Department
- St. George Police Department
- Stockton Police Department
- Sunset Police Department
- Syracuse Police Department
- Taylorsville Police Department
- Tooele Police Department
- Tremonton Police Department
- Vernal Police Department
- Washington City Department of Public Safety
- Wellington Police Department
- West Bountiful Police Department
- West Jordan Police Department
- West Valley City Police Department
- Willard Police Department
- Woods Cross Police Department

== Tribal agencies ==
- Goshute Tribal Police Department
- Navajo Nation Police
- Navajo Rangers

== Multi-jurisdictional and district agencies ==
- Canyons School District Security
- Colorado City, Arizona-Hildale, Utah Marshal's Office
- Granite School District Police Department
- Lone Peak Police Department (Alpine & Highland)
- North Park Police Department (Hyde Park & North Logan)
- Salt Lake City Airport Police Department
- Santa Clara-Ivins Police Department
- Santaquin-Genola Police Department
- Unified Police Department of Greater Salt Lake
- Utah Transit Authority Police Department

== College and university agencies ==
- Brigham Young University Police Department
- Dixie State University Police Department
- Salt Lake Community College Department of Public Safety
- Snow College Police Department
- Southern Utah University Police Department
- University of Utah Police Department
- Utah State University-Eastern Police Department
- Utah State University Police Department
- Utah Valley University Police Department
- Weber State University Police Department
- Westminster College Department of Patrol & Campus Safety
