= Sugar House Prison (Utah) =

Former prison in Salt Lake City, Utah, United States

Sugar House Prison formerly Utah Territorial Penitentiary
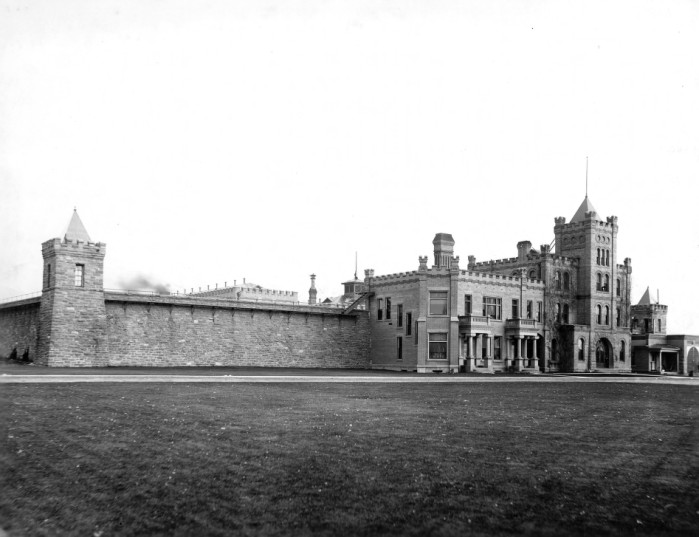
- The state penitentiary in 1903
- Interactive map of Sugar House Prison formerly Utah Territorial Penitentiary
- Location: Sugar House neighborhood Salt Lake City, Utah United States; 40.723°N 111.849°W
- Status: Defunct
- Population: 575 (March 12, 1951)
- Opened: January 1855
- Closed: March 12, 1951
- Managed by: U.S. Marshals (1871-1896); Utah Department of Corrections (1896-1951)

Sugar House Prison, previously the Utah Territorial Penitentiary, was a prison in the Sugar House neighborhood of Salt Lake City, Utah, United States. The 180-acre (73 ha) prison housed more than 400 inmates. It was closed in 1951 due to encroaching housing development, and all of its inmates were moved to the new Utah State Prison in Draper. The site is now occupied by Sugar House Park and Highland High School.

== History ==
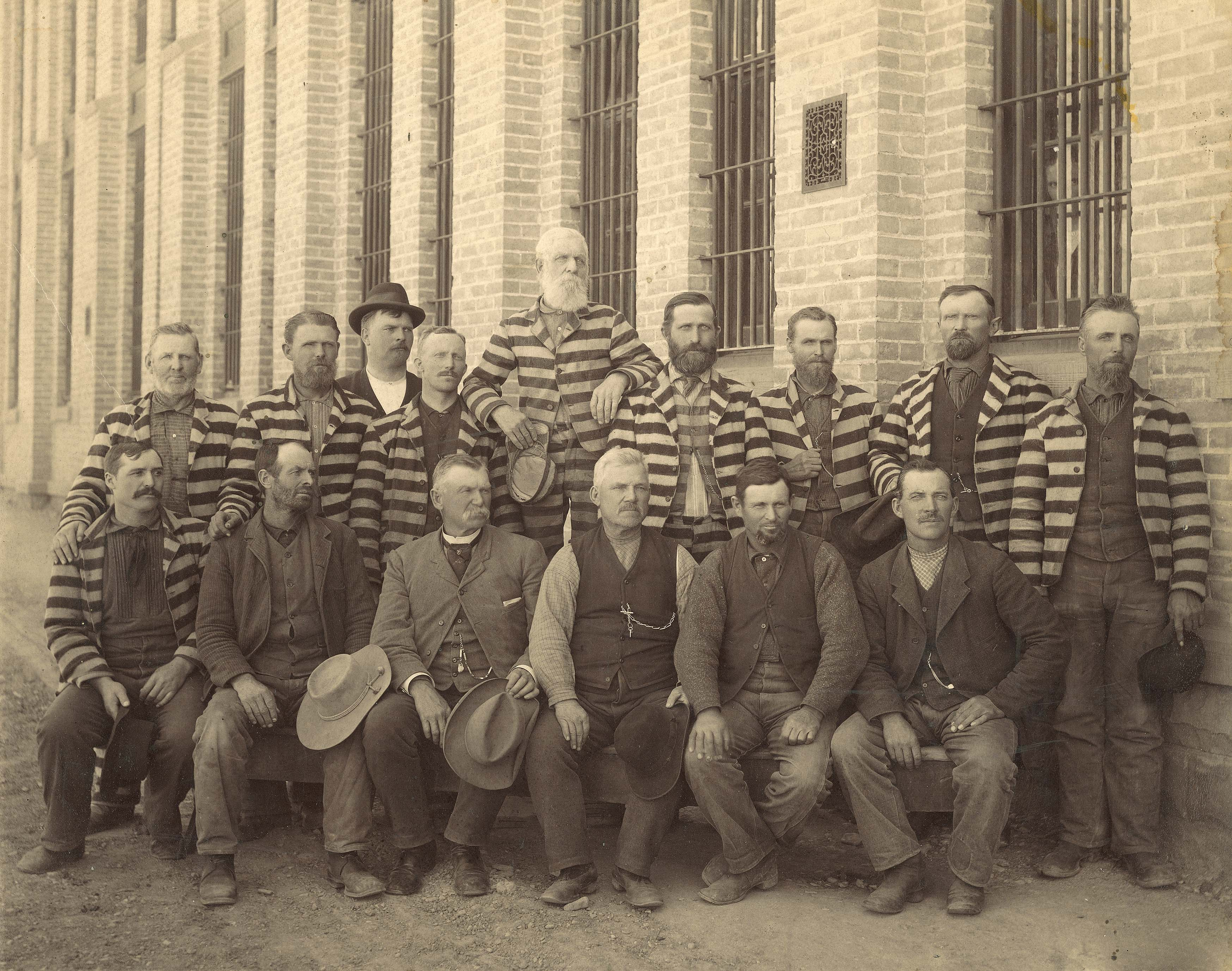
Prisoners in front of former Sugar House Prison, circa 1887

=== Territorial prison ===
In January 1852 Territorial Assembly of the Utah Territory approved a memorial requesting Congress appropriate $70,000 for a territorial penitentiary. Congress approved an appropriation of $20,000 in March 1853 and plans were drawn up. The following October, territorial governor Brigham Young selected the 10-acre (4.0 ha) government-owned site, then known as "The Big Field Survey", about six miles from central Salt Lake City. Sixteen "cozy cells dug into the ground, with iron bars on top" comprised the original prison at a cost of $32,000. The facility that became known as the Utah Territorial Penitentiary was opened in 1855. In 1867, the Utah Territorial Legislature determined that the prison was inadequate and once considered moving it onto an island in the Great Salt Lake. From 1871 to 1896, the penitentiary was federally operated by U.S. Marshals. The inmate capacity was expanded in 1875 to accommodate 300 individuals with the construction of a new cell house and prison walls.

=== State prison ===
In 1896, the buildings and surrounding lands were given to the newly created State of Utah and were designated as the Utah State Prison, sometimes referred to as the "state pen". Starting in 1900, executions by the state were carried out in the prison. Prior to that, death penalties were administered in the counties where the crimes had been committed. Tickets were distributed in 1903 for admission to publicly view an execution by firing squad.

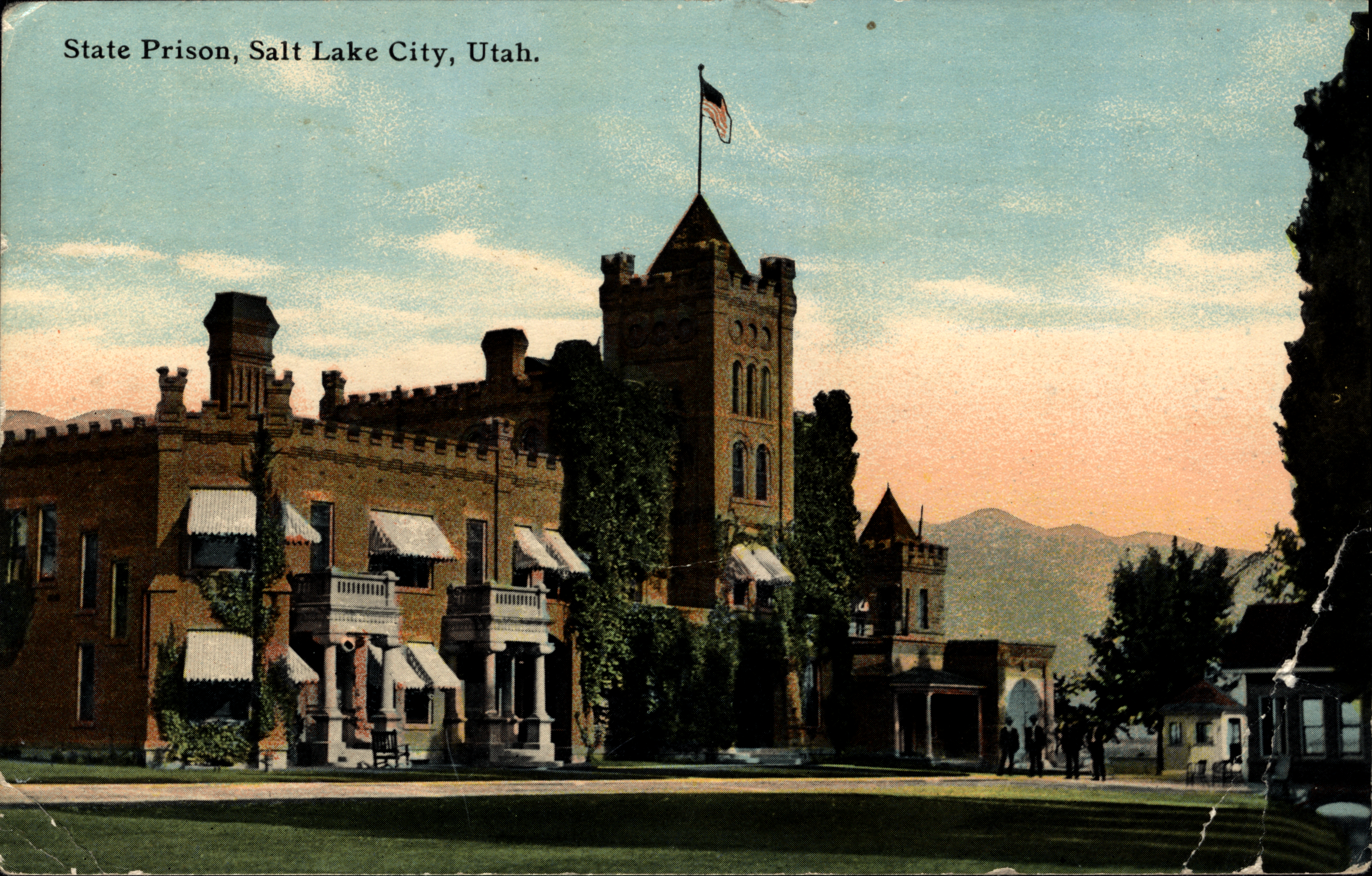
Sugar House Prison Postcard, Circa 1910.

With the continuing growth of Salt Lake City, the local residents eventually wanted the prison population relocated away from the neighborhood of Sugar House. In 1937, plans were approved for a new prison, 22 miles south of the city in Draper. By 1941, work began on the 1019-acre (408 ha) site, then called "Point of the Mountain", to replace the aging penitentiary. However, construction of the new facility was delayed because of shortages stemming from World War II. On March 12, 1951, the 575 inmates at the old prison were transferred by bus to the newly completed Utah State Prison. After nine sticks of dynamite had little effect on the heavy walls of the shuttered penitentiary, the demolition of many sections had to be carried out stone by stone.

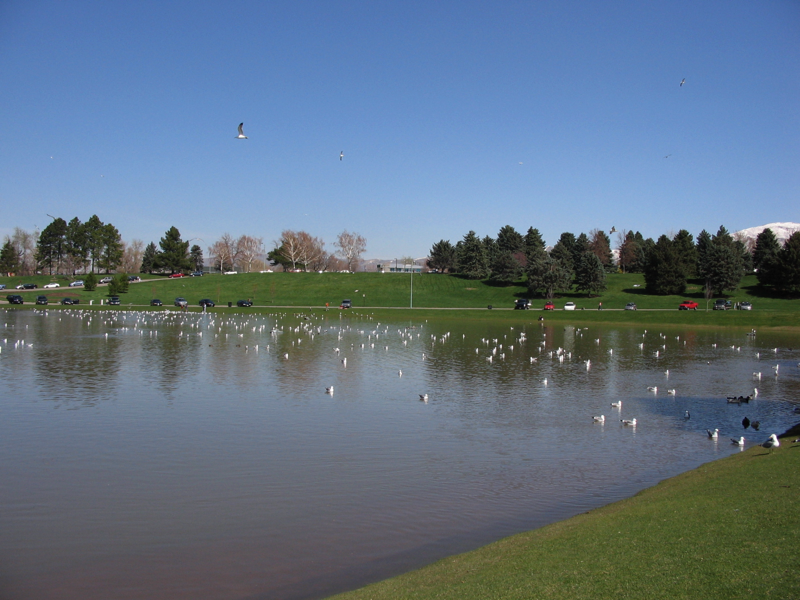
Sugar House Park

=== City/County Park ===
Following the razing of the old prison, proposals to repurpose the land included an amusement park, campground, golf course, and shopping center. The former site eventually became Sugar House Park, jointly owned by Salt Lake City and Salt Lake County, while 30 acres (12 ha) were set aside for the future campus of Highland High School.

== Notable inmates ==
- George Q. Cannon, early Mormon leader who was given a six-month sentence in September 1888 for "unlawful cohabitation" under the Edmunds Act.
- John Deering, convicted murderer who was executed by firing squad in 1938 while hooked up to an electrocardiogram.
- Joe Hill, convicted of murdering storekeeper John A. Morrison on circumstantial evidence; executed in 1915 at the prison despite attempts at intervention by President Woodrow Wilson.

== See also ==
- Capital punishment in Utah
- List of Utah state prisons
- Utah Department of Corrections
