= 1990 Tiede cabin murders =

1990 double murder at a mountain cabin in Utah

- 1990 booking photos of the Tiede cabin murderers
- Location: Oakley, Utah, U.S.
- Date: December 22, 1990
- Attack type: Burglary, kidnapping, murder by shooting
- Victims: Murdered; Beth Potts, 76; Kaye Tiede, 49; Survived; Rolf Tiede, 51; Linae Tiede, 20; Tricia Tiede, 16
- Perpetrators: Von Lester Taylor; Edward Steven Deli
- Motive: Burglary
- Verdict: Guilty on all counts
- Convictions: Taylor: Aggravated murder; Deli: Murder
- Sentence: Taylor: Death; Deli: Seven consecutive terms of life without parole

The 1990 Tiede cabin murder occurred December 22, 1990, at a mountain cabin in Oakley, Utah, United States. Two paroled criminals broke into a family’s holiday cabin intending burglary, and later attacked the Tiede family who had returned to the cabin. The suspects killed two people and injured a third, before kidnapping the family’s two daughters and attempting arson of the cabin.

The recently paroled criminals were 25-year-old Von Lester Taylor and 21-year-old Edward Steven Deli. They shot and killed 76-year-old Beth Potts and her 49-year-old daughter Kaye Tiede. They also shot 51-year-old Rolf Tiede, Kaye’s husband, who survived. Taylor and Deli kidnapped 16-year-old Tricia and 20-year-old Linae.

Both Taylor and Deli were apprehended and charged with aggravated murder, attempted aggravated murder and aggravated kidnapping. Taylor pleaded guilty to the aggravated murder charges and was sentenced to death. Deli went to trial and was ultimately sentenced to life in prison, after jurors found him guilty of murder but not aggravated murder. Taylor selected lethal injection as his preferred method of execution, and as of 2026 remains on Utah’s death row.

== Double murder ==
On December 22, 1990, in Oakley, Utah, a family residing at their mountain cabin for the winter were attacked by two men, who killed two female members of the family and abducted another two women of the same family.

On that date, Von Lester Taylor, who was out of prison on parole for aggravated burglary, left the halfway house where he had been staying and joined Edward Steven Deli in breaking into the Tiede family's cabin near Beaver Springs in Oakley, while the family was away in Salt Lake City. Once inside, Taylor called a friend and said he planned "to shoot some people." Not long after, 49-year-old Kaye Tiede arrived at the cabin with her mother, Beth Potts, and one of her two daughters. Taylor and Deli confronted them at gunpoint. Taylor shot and killed both Tiede and her mother.

Later that afternoon, Tiede's husband Rolf Tiede and their other daughter arrived. Taylor held Rolf at gunpoint, stole $105 from him, and then shot him in the face once or twice. He then attempted to set Rolf, the house, and the garage on fire after dousing him in gasoline, but Rolf survived the attack. Taylor and Deli then abducted the couple's daughters – 16-year-old Tricia and 20-year-old Linae – and fled the scene. The men were caught and arrested after a high-speed police chase.

== Trial proceedings ==
After their arrests, both 21-year-old Edward Deli and 25-year-old Von Taylor were charged with multiple counts of first-degree murder, attempted first-degree murder and aggravated kidnapping.

=== Trial of Von Taylor ===
Von Taylor
- Born: Von Lester Taylor; March 26, 1965 (age 61); Utah, U.S.
- Conviction: Aggravated murder
- Penalty: Death

Details
- Victims: 2
- Date: December 22, 1990
- Location: Oakley, Utah
- Imprisoned at: Utah State Correctional Facility

Out of the two, Taylor, of Washington, Utah, chose to plead guilty to two counts of aggravated murder on May 2, 1991, in exchange for the remaining lesser charges against Taylor were dropped, although the prosecution still reserved their decision to seek the death penalty for Taylor.

On May 22, 1991, the jury unanimously recommended the death penalty for Taylor after more than four hours of deliberation. During his sentencing by Judge Frank Noel, Taylor confirmed to the court that he preferred to be executed by lethal injection; death row inmates in Utah were allowed to choose either firing squad or lethal injection.

=== Trial of Edward Deli ===
Edward Deli
- Born: Edward Steven Deli; December 29, 1968 (age 57); Utah, U.S.
- Conviction: Murder
- Penalty: Seven consecutive life sentences without parole

Details
- Victims: 2
- Date: December 22, 1990
- Location: Oakley, Utah
- Imprisoned at: Central Utah Correctional Facility

On the other hand, Deli pleaded not guilty and went to trial before a Summit County jury for murdering Kaye Tiede and Beth Potts. The defense argued Deli was not guilty of murder despite his involvement in the burglary, stating Taylor was the sole the shooter throughout the crime. During the trial itself, ballistic experts testified how bullets recovered at the scene showed the victims had been shot with two guns, one a .44-caliber handgun and another a .38-caliber gun. Eyewitnesses testified how Deli had wielded a .44-caliber gun at the victims prior to the shooting. The prosecution argued in return that whether or not Deli shot the victims, he was equally guilty of aggravated murder under the felony murder rule.

On May 14, 1991, the jury found Deli guilty of murder, after they failed to reach a unanimous vote to convict Deli of aggravated murder. Under Utah law, a murder conviction requires one or more aggravating circumstances to be eligible for capital punishment. According to reports, 11 out of the 12 jurors agreed that Deli was guilty of first-degree murder, but the 12th and final juror refused to find Deli guilty as charged, which reportedly caused the rest of the jury to be enraged at his decision. To avoid the possibility of a hung jury and mistrial declaration, the jury chose to convict Deli of lesser charges of second-degree murder. Due to the jury's decision, Deli was spared the death sentence, as the death penalty applied only to aggravated murder offences while the maximum punishment for murder was life imprisonment but not death.

The unnamed juror, who was a businessman, emphasized in an interview how he had no compassion for Deli and personally supported the death penalty. However, he defended his decision to not find Deli guilty of aggravated murder, stating that there was a reasonable doubt that Deli had actually killed any of the victims. He spoke highly of the prosecution and his fellow jury members, despite their disagreements.

On June 3, 1991, Third District Judge Frank Noel sentenced Deli to seven consecutive terms of life imprisonment (five years to life) for all nine felony offences, and with the possibility of parole after a minimum time of 62 years, his earliest possible release date would be in 2053. However, Judge Noel recommended that Deli's life sentences should not carry the possibility of parole, ensuring that he would spend the rest of his natural life in prison and never be released, a decision welcomed by the surviving kin of the victims.

On August 21, 1991, Mike Sibbett, a representative of the Utah Board of Pardons and Parole, announced that per the decision of the board, Deli would be serving life without the possibility of parole on account of the heinous nature of the double murder.

== Appellate process ==
=== Deli's appeal ===
In March 1993, the Utah Supreme Court heard an appeal from Edward Deli, who appealed to shorten his life sentences, and he stated that the multiple consecutive life terms would not serve any purpose of rehabilitation or parole in his case, and deprived him of his chance to be reformed and released from prison, and hence asked for a shorter sentence.

On October 15, 1993, the Utah Supreme Court dismissed Deli's appeal against his sentence.

=== Taylor's appeals ===
In 1995, an evidentiary hearing was conducted before the original trial court, as directed by the Utah Supreme Court, after Von Taylor appealed and argued that he was represented by ineffective legal counsel during his trial for murder and petitioned for a re-trial. The original trial judge, Frank Noel, rejected Taylor's claims of ineffective counsel and thus dismissed his appeal against conviction and petition for a re-trial.

On October 24, 1997, the Utah Supreme Court rejected Von Taylor's appeal against his death sentence and murder conviction.

On October 5, 1998, Taylor's appeal was denied by the U.S. Supreme Court.

In March 2004, Taylor had exhausted all his regular avenues of appeal at state-level, and his appellate process was transitioned to the federal courts.

In January 2007, the Utah Supreme Court rejected a post-conviction petition from Taylor, who claimed that he was unfairly sentenced for his role in the double murder. The court found that the sentencing was fair, even if the jury heard his newly discovered evidence of alleged brain damage as the evidence itself would not have precluded him from the death penalty.

In 2012, another appeal from Taylor was dismissed by the Utah Supreme Court.

In a 2016 federal appeal, Taylor argued against his conviction and sentence, claiming that he was innocent and he never fired any of the lethal shots that claimed the lives of Kaye Tiede and Beth Potts. On March 12, 2020, U.S. District Judge Tena Campbell of a Utah federal district court allowed the appeal of Taylor, and overturned his death sentence and murder conviction, after she found there was reasonable doubt that Taylor had shot any of the victims.

On July 30, 2021, the 10th Circuit Court of Appeals restored Taylor's murder conviction and death sentence. The court ruled even if Taylor had never shot any of the victims, he was still liable for a conviction of first-degree murder and death sentence because under Utah’s felony murder rule accomplices of certain serious crimes were considered equally guilty like the main perpetrators should a murder occur in the course of these crimes.

On June 13, 2022, the U.S. Supreme Court dismissed Taylor's final regular appeal, thus officiating Taylor's eligibility for execution on a later date to be determined.

In 2023, a fifth appeal was submitted by Taylor to a state district court in Utah.

== Current status ==
As of 2026, Von Taylor is incarcerated on death row at the Utah State Correctional Facility. Edward Deli is currently serving his life sentence at the Central Utah Correctional Facility.

== Aftermath ==
In the aftermath of the cabin murders, Rolf Tiede, Kaye Tiede's husband and one of the survivors of the slayings, filed a civil lawsuit and sued the state for damages due to their failure to act and intervene when both Taylor and Deli escaped from their halfway house and killed his wife and mother-in-law. The lawsuit was ultimately dismissed in 1996 by the Utah Supreme Court due to a state law that granted the government immunity from any lawsuit pertaining to such situations.

In 2011, 48 Hours, a crime documentary series produced by CBS News, released an episode covering the 1990 cabin murders, with the two daughters of Kaye Tiede, Tricia and Linae, appearing on-screen to speak about their traumatic experiences from the slayings. According to the surviving victims, both Deli and Taylor were equally culpable in the crimes. However, Taylor received the death penalty after pleading guilty to first-degree murder, while Deli was sentenced to life imprisonment on the lesser charge of second-degree murder after standing trial for first-degree murder. Some anti-death penalty advocates cited the case as an example of the arbitrary application of capital punishment, pointing to the unequal sentencing outcome in the Tiede cabin murders.

== See also ==
- Capital punishment in Utah
- List of death row inmates in the United States § Utah
