= List of Parole Boards in the United States =

Parole boards in the United States do not have uniform titles, nor uniform powers or jurisdictions. In many cases their traditional powers have been limited by "determinate sentencing" and other reform legislation.

This list is intended to be exhaustive of federal and state-level parole and pardon agencies. It does not include local state agencies, nor governor's offices where the pardon function is not in a separate agency. In some cases the pardoning and paroling function are not within the same agency. As of 2018, sixteen states had abolished the parole function in favor of "determinate sentencing". Wisconsin, in 2000, was the last state to abolish that function. The United States Parole Commission, a federal agency within the Department of Justice, retains jurisdiction over offenders sentenced under federal law prior to the abolition of federal parole in 1987, as well as jurisdiction over District of Columbia offenders and certain other categories. However, parole boards in those states continue to exist in order to deal with imprisoned felons sentenced before the imposition of "determinate sentencing".

== Federal ==
- United States Parole Commission
- Naval Clemency and Parole Board
- California Board of Parole Hearings
- Colorado Board of Parole
- Louisiana Board of Pardons and Parole
- Maryland Parole Commission
- Ohio Adult Parole Authority
- Oregon Board of Parole and Post-Prison Supervision

== States ==
- Alabama Board of Pardons and Paroles
- Alaska Department of Corrections Parole Board
- Arizona board abolished as of 1994, duties transferred to the Community Corrections Division of the Arizona Department of Corrections
- Arkansas Parole Board
- Connecticut Board of Pardons and Paroles
- Georgia State Board of Pardons and Paroles
- Idaho Commission of Pardons and Parole
- Illinois Parole and Pardon Board replaced by the Illinois Prisoner Review Board
- Kansas Prisoner Review Board
- Kentucky Parole Board
- Minnesota Board of Pardons
- Nebraska Board of Pardons
- Nevada Board of Parole Commissioners
- New Hampshire Department of Corrections#Adult Parole Board
- New Jersey State Parole Board
- New Mexico Parole Board
- New York State Division of Parole
- Oklahoma Pardon and Parole Board
- Pennsylvania Board of Probation and Parole
- Rhode Island Parole Board
- South Carolina Department of Probation, Parole, and Pardon Services
- Tennessee Board of Parole
- Texas Board of Pardons and Paroles
- Utah Board of Pardons and Parole
- Virginia Parole Board
- Wisconsin Parole Commission
- Wyoming Board of Parole
