= Ronald B. Jarrett =

Ronald B. Jarrett has been the president of the Mormon Tabernacle Choir since June 2012.

As the choir president, Jarrett overseas its business operations. Jarrett holds bachelor's and master's degrees from Brigham Young University and a graduate educational certificate from the University of Utah. He was a public school educator for 34 years, working for 22 years as a school principal.

Jarrett was a member of the Mormon Tabernacle Choir from 1999 to 2008. From 2008 until May 2011, he served as an assistant to former choir president, Mac Christensen. From May 2011 until June 2012, Jarrett served as a public affairs missionary in Germany for the Church of Jesus Christ of Latter-day Saints.

== Sources ==
- KSL article on Jarrett's appointment as Tabernacle Choir president
- Mormon Tabernacle Choir article on Jarrett's appointment
