= Megan Huntsman child murders =

Serial killings committed by Megan Huntsman

Megan Huntsman child murders were the six killings of newborn children in Utah between 1996 and 2006, committed shortly after birth by their mother Megan Huntsman (born 1975). She also concealed the death of a seventh child who was stillborn.

The serial infanticide was discovered in April 2014 when Huntsman's ex-husband Darren West began cleaning the garage of the home he once shared with her in Pleasant Grove, Utah. West discovered a small white box, wrapped in plastic, which contained the small, decomposing body of a baby. Appalled by the discovery, he contacted authorities.

Megan was questioned by police after admitting to Darren how she had given birth and put the infant's stillborn body in the garage. During this interview she admitted first to killing four children, before finally stating she did not know how many there might be, at one point saying "eight or nine". Megan stated she had "choked" all the infants, with the exception of one who was stillborn. She had never disclosed any of the pregnancies to others or sought medical treatment during pregnancy, and Pleasant Grove police attributed the murders to her being absorbed in her drug addiction and unwilling to handle the responsibilities of additional children. In the end, police discovered a total of seven infant bodies, one of which was stillborn but the others were murdered. After the full investigation it was determined all the babies were Darren West's children, but Megan Huntsman, unbeknownst to him, had murdered them minutes after they were delivered. She pleaded guilty to six counts of murder, and was sentenced to a minimum of 15 years with maximum potential sentence of life imprisonment.

== Perpetrator ==
Megan Huntsman
- Born: February 26, 1975 (age 51)
- Spouse: Darren West (divorced)
- Children: 10
- Status: Incarcerated
- Conviction: Murder (6 counts)
- Penalty: 15 years to life imprisonment

Details
- Victims: 6
- Span of crimes: 1996–2006
- Country: United States
- State: Utah
- Date apprehended: April 2014
- Imprisoned at: Utah State Correctional Facility

Megan Huntsman (born February 26, 1975) grew up in Pleasant Grove as the oldest child of an industrial painter and a mother who worked at a grocery store, among other jobs. She was raised in the Church of Jesus Christ of Latter-day Saints, but according to an uncle had not been active in church functions by the time of her arrest.. Megan attended Pleasant Grove High School. At high school she met Darren West, and they married in April 1993 shortly after she turned 18.

Their marriage eventually struggled with substance abuse and violence. West was convicted of methamphetamine-related charges and imprisoned between 2006 and 2014.

== Murders ==
Huntsman committed all of her murders either by strangulation or suffocation, then hid the bodies in boxes in her garage. Police said Huntsman had been a heavy methamphetamine user and "didn't want the babies". She also said she committed one of the murders when her husband and her brother and sister were in the house watching television. Megan's first three children were not murdered and were alive at the time her crimes were discovered.

== Legal proceedings ==
On February 12, 2015, Huntsman pleaded guilty to six counts of felony murder. On April 20, Huntsman was sentenced to six counts of 5 years-to-life in prison with three counts to be served consecutively and three counts to be served concurrently.
