= Texas Board of Pardons and Paroles =

Texas state agency

Agency overview
- Formed: 1935; 91 years ago
- Jurisdiction: Texas
- Status: Active
- Headquarters: Austin, Texas, USA
- Agency executive: David Gutiérrez, Chair and Presiding Officer
- Website: Official website

The Texas Board of Pardons and Paroles (BPP) is a state agency that makes parole and clemency decisions for inmates in Texas prisons. It is headquartered in Austin, Texas.

The BPP was created by constitutional amendment in 1935. It determines which prisoners are to be released on parole or discretionary mandatory supervision and under what conditions of parole supervision. If a parolee violates a parole condition, the board also makes decisions about revocation or other options. The board also is responsible for issuing recommendations on clemency matters to the governor.

The BPP works closely with the Texas Department of Criminal Justice (TDCJ), which has responsibility for housing convicted felons, determining release and parole eligibility dates and supervising offenders on parole or mandatory supervision.

== History ==
Under Article IV, Section 11 of the Texas Constitution, the power to grant executive clemency (pardons, paroles, furloughs, etc.) was given to the governor of the state. To assist the process of clemency reviews, two government-appointed members helped to aid clemency applications through the Board of Pardon Advisors, established in 1893. Over time, the governor's authority was legislatively reduced as previous powers were delegated to other boards and departments.

It wasn't until 1929, when Texas State Legislature renamed the Board of Pardon Advisors to the Board of Pardons and Paroles, which contained three members appointed by the governor and one designated as supervisor of paroles

In 1935, the Texas Constitution was amended to create the BPP as a member of the executive branch with constitutional authority, and making the governor's clemency authority subject to board recommendation. The governor, the chief justice of the Texas Supreme Court and the presiding judge of the Texas Court of Criminal Appeals each appointed one member to the BPP. Members served overlapping six-year terms, one term expiring every two years. The BPP recommended parole and clemency to the governor, who had final approving authority.

The legislature in 1947 authorized the board, with approval of the governor, to release prisoners for parole or probation, with the exception of those with a death sentence. A division of parole supervision was established in 1957 as part of the BPP, to open up district offices across the state to monitor offenders.

In 1975, the Texas legislature created six parole commissioner positions to "assist the Board of Pardons and Paroles in parole matters." The commissioners were appointed in the same manner as the board members, with six-year terms and two terms expiring every two years.

In 1983, the Texas Constitution was amended to expand the BPP to six members, appointed by the governor, including naming a chairman, with the advice and consent of the state senate. The governor's authority to release and revoke offenders was transferred to the board.

The BPP was further modified as part of a 1989 reorganization that created the Texas Department of Criminal Justice to oversee probation, incarceration and parole supervision. Changes under that legislation included, but were not limited to:

- Expanding the board to 18 members, appointed by the governor with senate approval; and
- Eliminating the parole commissioner positions.

The legislature made mandatory supervision discretionary in 1995 for any offender with an offense committed on or after September 1, 1996, by granting the BPP authority to block a scheduled mandatory supervision release based on an assessment of risk to the public and the actual time served not being an accurate reflection of the potential for rehabilitation.

In 1997, the legislature modified the 18-member BPP board by creating a policy board with the chair as the presiding officer. The policy board was composed of six of the members who were designated by the governor to:

- Adopt rules for board decision-making,
- Establish caseloads for board members,
- Develop and update parole guidelines and policies, and
- Carry out other functions.

The BPP currently operates under legislative changes made in 2003 that replaced the eighteen-member board with a chairman/presiding officer and six board members. Parole commissioners were added to assist the board with release decisions, revocation decisions and imposition of special parole conditions. The chair/presiding officer and board members are appointed by the governor with approval from the senate. Parole commissioners, currently fourteen with two serving in each of seven board offices, are hired by the presiding officer.

== Governance ==
As of 2024, the current chair and presiding officer of the BPP is Marsha Moberley, appointed by Governor Greg Abbott. The BPP meets at least quarterly each fiscal year. Board members maintain offices in seven regions around the state: Amarillo, Angleton, Austin, Gatesville, Huntsville, Palestine and San Antonio. Additional offices are maintained throughout Texas for parole hearings and institutional parole officers.

== Parole guidelines system ==
A research-based parole guidelines system assists board members in making parole decisions. The guidelines provide a rating score for each offender based on the seriousness of the offense and the likelihood of a favorable parole outcome.

The guidelines consist of two major components – a risk assessment and an offense severity classification – that combine to create a single ranking score.

The risk assessment uses both Static Factors – age at first admission to a correctional facility, criminal record, history of incarcerations, previous release revocations, employment history – and Dynamic Factors that may change—educational, vocational, or on-the-job training in prison, disciplinary conduct, prison custody level, age – to determine a risk level score.

The board also has assigned an offense severity classification to the felony charges in the criminal code. Severity rankings range from "low," for non-violent crimes such as credit card abuse, to "highest" for major crimes, such as capital murder.

The risk level and severity rankings combine to create a single score. The higher the score, the more likely an offender is to complete parole successfully. The parole guidelines are formulated to ensure the guideline criteria reflect board policy; are applied in a consistent manner to all candidates for parole (reliable), and are predictive of risk to public safety (valid). The board's goal is to continuously identify any parole guideline-related issues in order to maintain current and effective guidelines.

== Voting process ==
The BPP uses three-member parole voting panels for most cases, with exceptions based on violent crimes identified by statute that require a two-thirds majority of the board to grant parole. Three-member panels typically are composed of one board member and two parole commissioners.

Parole eligibility is determined by TDCJ based on statute. When an offender becomes parole eligible, a review of the offender's file begins. An institutional parole officer interviews the offender and prepares a case summary for the voting panel. The file and case summary are sent to the panel voters. At the request of any victim as defined by statute, the lead voter must interview the victim. Interview requests from the offender, other supporters or protesters are at the discretion of the lead voter.

After the lead voter enters a decision, the file goes to the second voter. If the first two voters agree, the case is decided. If the two disagree, the case goes to the third panel member whose vote decides the case.

The panel voters have a number of options, including requiring that offenders complete specific treatment and rehabilitation programs prior to release. The panel also may set special conditions for the offender on parole.

In the fiscal year 2012, the BPP considered nearly 80,000 parole cases, with 37 percent approved for parole, and almost 20,000 discretionary mandatory supervision (DMS) cases, with 58 percent approved. In 2023, the BPP considered roughly 65,000 parole cases, with 35 percent approved for parole as well as about 15,000 DMS cases, with a 44 percent acceptance rate. The data suggests a gradual decline in both parole and DMS approval rates over the last 15 years.

== Parole revocation decisions ==
When an offender is released on parole or mandatory supervision they are required to abide by both general and special conditions that have been imposed. If it is alleged that an offender has violated the terms and conditions of release, due process allows the offender to request a hearing prior to the revocation of parole. Mentally competent offenders also have the opportunity to waive their right to this revocation hearing. If a hearing is held, the information is presented and a hearing officer makes the determination if there is sufficient evidence to support the allegation(s). The hearing report and evidence are presented to a BPP panel for a decision on whether to continue parole, impose additional conditions for parole to continue, place the offender in a special facility for a short-term, or revoke parole.

Through the use of graduated sanctions, the BPP has reduced the number of offenders returning to prison, particularly on what are considered technical violations. In FY 2012, only 20 percent of parole violation cases resulted in the offender returning to prison, and only 12 percent of those cases were solely for technical reasons. In most cases, parole is continued, although possibly with additional conditions, or the individual is referred for a short period of time to an intermediate sanction facility or substance abuse felony punishment facility.

More than 22,000 preliminary and revocation hearings were held in Fiscal Year 2012.

== Medical cases ==
The board also reviews cases of offenders whose medical condition may qualify them for an early parole through Medically Recommended Intensive Supervision (MRIS). If an offender qualifies for release to Medically Recommended Intensive Supervision (MRIS), the MRIS panel bases its decisions on the offender's medical condition and prognosis, and whether the offender constitutes a threat to public safety. Offenders must comply with the terms and conditions of the MRIS program and abide by a Texas Correctional Office for Offenders with Medical or Mental Impairments (TCOOMMI) approved release plan. Offenders remain under the care of a physician and in a medically suitable placement.

== Clemency recommendations ==
Anyone seeking clemency must complete an application, including required documentation and submit it to the board's clemency section.

The Governor of Texas has authority to grant clemency only upon written recommendation of a majority of the members of the BPP; however, the governor is free to reject the recommendation.

Clemency includes but is not limited to:

- Full pardons after conviction,
- Full pardons after successful completion of a term of deferred adjudication community supervision,
- Conditional pardons,
- Pardons based on innocence,
- Commutations of sentence,
- Emergency medical reprieves, and
- Family medical reprieves.

In capital cases, clemency includes a commutation of sentence to a lesser penalty and a reprieve of execution. The governor can unilaterally issue a one-time, 30-day stay of execution in a capital case.

== Annual statistics ==
The board publishes annual data on the number of parole cases, revocation hearings, clemency applications and related activities and the percentages of approvals. The data is available on the board website.

== See also ==
- List of Parole Boards in the United States
