= Minnesota Board of Pardons =

The Minnesota Board of Pardons is the pardon board of the state of Minnesota. The Board of Pardons consists of the Governor of Minnesota, the chief justice of the Minnesota Supreme Court, and Minnesota Attorney General. The board has to power to grant executive clemency (pardons and reprieves) and commutation of sentences of any person convicted of any offense against the laws of the state, subject to certain regulations.

The Board of Pardons is required by law to meet at least twice each year and whenever it takes formal action on an application for a pardon or commutation of sentence. All board meetings are open to the public.

Minnesota is one of nine states in the United States with a Board of Pardons and Paroles that exclusively grants all state pardons. Alabama (Board of Pardons and Paroles), Connecticut (Board of Pardons and Paroles), Georgia (Board of Pardons and Paroles), Idaho (Commission of Pardons and Paroles), Nebraska (Board of Pardons), Nevada (Board of Pardon Commissioners), South Carolina (Board of Probation, Parole and Pardon), and Utah (Utah Board of Pardons and Parole) are the other eight states in the United States with similar state boards.

The Board is also required to file a written report with the Minnesota Legislature by February 15 of each year containing the following information: the number of applications received by the board during the preceding calendar year for pardons, pardons extraordinary, and commutations of sentence, the number of applications granted by the board for each category, and the crimes for which the applications were granted by the board, the year of each conviction, and the age of the offender at the time of the offense.
