= Troy Kell =

American murderer on death row

- Born: June 13, 1968 (age 58); Nevada, U.S.
- Known for: The 1986 murder of James "Cotton" Kelly
- Convictions: Nevada; First degree murder Robbery; Utah; Aggravated murder
- Penalty: Nevada; Life imprisonment Utah; Death

Details
- Victims: 2
- Date: 1986 and 1994
- States: Nevada & Utah
- Imprisoned at: Utah State Correctional Facility

Troy Michael Kell (born June 13, 1968) is an inmate on death row in Utah. Kell was sentenced to life in prison by the State of Nevada for the 1986 murder of James "Cotton" Kelly. He was transferred to the Utah State Prison as part of a prisoner exchange program shortly after his conviction and on July 6, 1994, Kell attacked and killed inmate Lonnie Blackmon at the Utah Department of Corrections Gunnison facility. Kell stabbed Blackmon a total of 67 times while his associate, Eric Daniels, held Blackmon down. Kell was sentenced to death by firing squad for the murder.

== Trial ==
Due to security concerns, the state won the right to hold Kell's trial for the death of Blackmon in a courtroom within the Utah State Prison facility. Convicted of aggravated murder, the state pushed for and secured a death sentence from the jury. Prosecutors said the murder of Blackmon, an African American, by Kell, a white supremacist, was racially motivated. In 2003, Kell came within a month of execution by firing squad after initially dropping his appeals, but eventually chose to file an appeal. As of April 2024 Kell remains on death row, as his appeals process continues.

== Previous murder conviction ==
Kell was originally imprisoned in the state of Nevada for the murder of 21-year-old James "Cotton" Kelly. Although tried for killing "Kelly," the victim's real name was James Thiede, a Canadian citizen who was under investigation for drug smuggling by the Royal Canadian Mounted Police. Some years later, Thiede's mother, father, and uncle were federally indicted both in Las Vegas and Toronto for drug smuggling, all using the same alias, "Kelly." In 1986, Kell, then age 18, was asked by his 15-year-old long-time friend, Sandy Shaw, to beat Cotton Kelly for stalking her. Her mother had gone to the police earlier, but there were no stalking laws on the books at that time.

Cotton Kelly drove with Shaw, Kell, and a third young man (William "Billy" Merritt) into the desert, where Kell shot Kelly six times in the face, killing him. The murder was dubbed the "Show and Tell Murder" by Las Vegas media because Shaw and another teen (David Fletcher) allegedly returned to the scene of the crime with their friends, to see the corpse. One of the friends eventually reported the incident to the police, which led to the arrests and convictions of Shaw, Kell, and Merritt.

In the affidavit that helped free Shaw after many years of incarceration, Fletcher said that Shaw never went back to the scene or took friends to see the body. Fletcher also admitted that District Attorney Dan Seaton got Fletcher to change his testimony and commit perjury at Shaw's trial because Seaton threatened him with prosecution for grand theft for taking the victim's expensive watch and ring. Fletcher further stated that he believed that his testimony was what convicted Shaw and expressed "deep regret" but also "relief" for coming forward after all those years.

The Las Vegas Sun reported Shaw's words: "I made a horrible, immature decision to ask a friend to rough this man up so he would leave me alone," Sandy says. "Cotton Kelly had been hassling me and pestering me to go out with him and to pose for nude pictures. He would call our house at all hours of the day and was so persistent that my mom phoned the police to request that they keep him away from me. But they didn't have stalking laws in place then like we have today."

For her part in the crime, Shaw was sentenced to life in prison without the possibility of parole. In 2004, the State Board of Pardons and Parole commuted her sentence making her eligible for parole. She served 21 years of her sentence and was released on parole in December 2007. William Merritt, who testified against Kell, was released from prison after serving only 4 years of an 8-to-12-year, plea-bargained sentence. He later returned for subsequent crimes and is now serving life in prison without parole for raping and kidnapping his girlfriend in 2008. Troy Kell was sentenced to life in prison without parole. In 2022, Shaw was granted a pardon by the state Board of Pardons.

== Documentary production ==
HBO, in cooperation with Blowback Productions, filmed a documentary, entitled Gladiator Days: Anatomy of a Prison Murder, released in 2002. It tells the story of Troy Kell and Eric Daniels' murder of Lonnie Blackmon, and shows footage of the initial trial in 1986; statements from Kell, Daniels, guards, the state attorney, Blackmon's brother, and Sandra Shaw (who was serving time elsewhere as the instigator of Kell's first murder, for which Kell was originally incarcerated); and footage of the attack captured by the CCTV within the Utah Prison in Gunnison, Utah.

== See also ==
- Capital punishment in Utah
- List of death row inmates in the United States
