= Nick Clatterbuck =

American convicted murderer

- Born: Nicholas Alan Clatterbuck
- Status: Incarcerated
- Penalty: 5 years to life in prison

Details
- Victims: 2
- Imprisoned at: Central Utah Correctional Facility

Nicholas Alan Clatterbuck was convicted of murder when he was a child. At the time of the murders, he was a 15-year-old living in a foster home with his foster parents and their children in Utah County, Utah, United States.

== Description ==
On February 28, 1984, Clatterbuck had some disagreements with the foster parents, resulting in Clatterbuck shooting the foster father 16 times, killing him. He then proceeded to shoot the foster mother several times and stabbed her, resulting in her death. The state decided to prosecute Clatterbuck as an adult.

Clatterbuck was represented by attorney Michael D. Esplin throughout the juvenile court process where it was determined that he should be tried as an adult in the adult court system. He appealed this determination through the Utah Supreme Court, but his appeal was denied and it was ruled once again that he could be tried as an adult.

The state charged Clatterbuck with capital homicide charges, which carried the death penalty. Esplin represented Clatterbuck in those proceedings, which ultimately resulted in a plea deal, where the death penalty was taken off the table, and Clatterbuck pleaded to two homicide charges resulting in a sentence of 5 to life in the Utah State Prison.

In 1989, Clatterbuck graduated from high school in prison and was named "outstanding student for the year."

As of June 2020, Clatterbuck is serving his sentence at the Central Utah Correctional Facility.
