= Utah State Correctional Facility =

Mixed security prison in Salt Lake City, Utah, United States

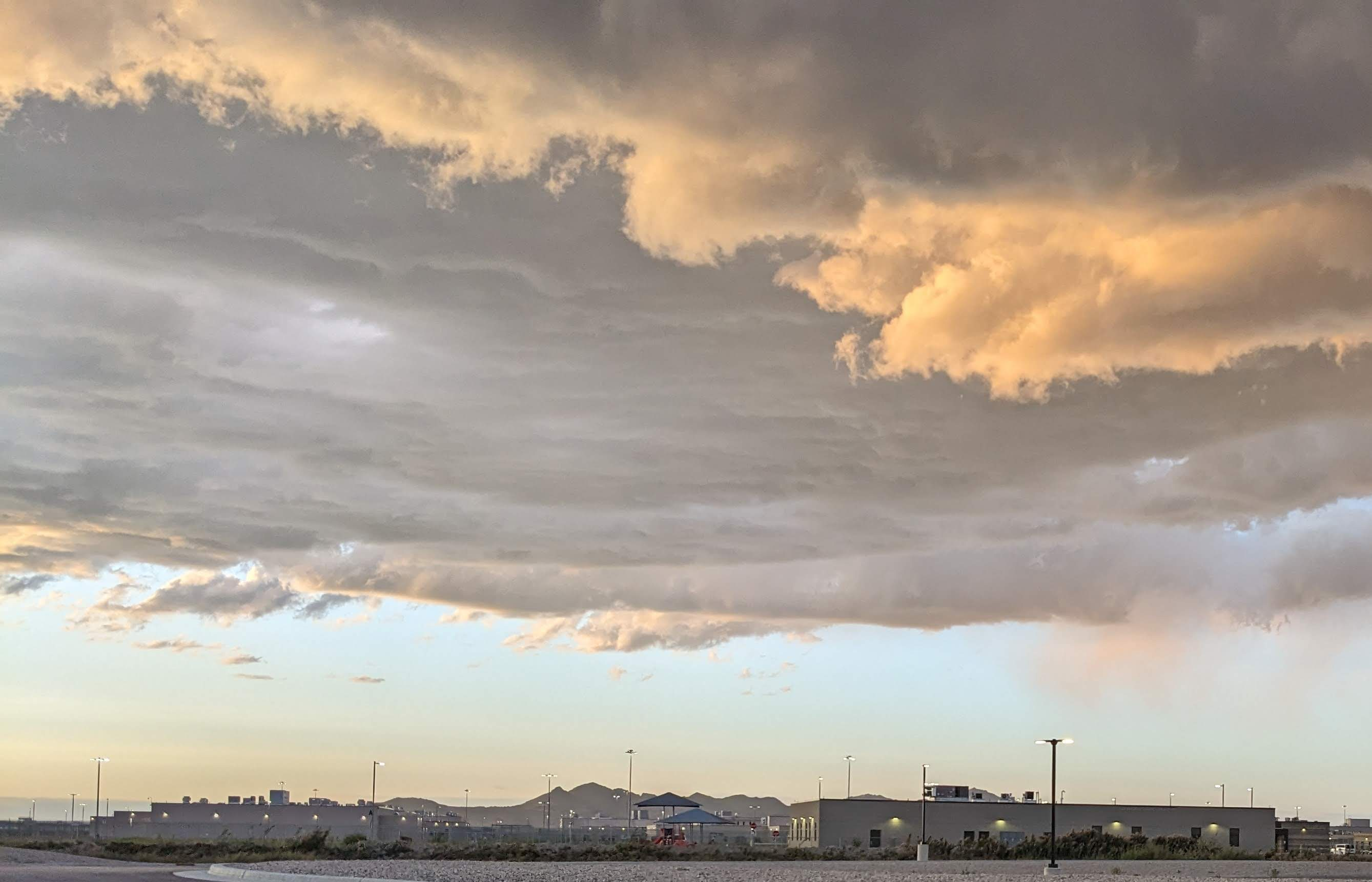
- Interactive map of Utah State Correctional Facility
- Location: Salt Lake City, Utah; 40°48′17″N 112°5′26.5″W
- Security class: Minimum to Supermax
- Population: 3,059 (February 2024)
- Opened: July 2022
- Managed by: Utah Department of Corrections
- Director: Brian Nielson
- Warden: Sharon D'Amico

Utah State Correctional Facility (USCF) is one of two prisons managed by the Utah Department of Corrections' Division of Prison Operations. It is located in the northwestern corner of Salt Lake City, Utah, United States. It replaced the former Utah State Prison in July 2022.

== Description ==
The new 1.3-million sq ft (120-thousand m^{2}), $1 billion facility is located at 1480 North 8000 West on 170 acres (69 ha) north of Interstate 80, but is barely visible from the freeway.

The large prison complex houses both male and female prisoners in separate facilities. These facilities range from minimum security to supermax. Upon opening, 2,464 inmates were transferred from the former Utah State Prison. The Bear Facility houses men's general population, the Antelope Facility houses restricted men's population, the Currant Facility houses men's geriatric and mental health population, and the Dell Facility houses female inmates.

The Utah State Correctional Facility is the only prison in Utah authorized to carry out capital punishment, with executions carried out by lethal injection or firing squad (for death row inmates sentenced to death before May 2004 or if the state is unable to obtain the necessary lethal injection drugs within 30 days of a scheduled execution). The first inmate to be executed in the facility was Taberon Honie on August 8, 2024; this was also the first execution in Utah since 2010.

== History ==
The former Utah State Prison was built in Draper in 1951. Since the former prison's erection, business parks and residential neighborhoods have developed the once rural area into a suburban one. Seeking the ability to offer better treatment options, the state legislature initiated a process to build a new prison, deciding it was best to relocate elsewhere. A study was completed in 2005 by Wikstrom Economic & Planning Consultants to determine if moving the prison would be feasible. The test of feasibility was whether or not the value of the real estate of the current location could support the cost of relocation. It was determined that the cost of relocating the prison far exceeded the value that could be realized from the sale of the Draper prison site. However, on August 19, 2015, a special session of the state legislature voted to move the prison to the northwest side of Salt Lake City.

The new facility was completed and the inmates from the former prison were transferred July 11–15, 2022. The former prison officially closed on July 15, 2022.

In March 2025, a total of 140 inmates at the prison were treated for scabies.

== Notable inmates ==
- Michael Anthony Archuleta – serving a death sentence for murder.
- Ruby Franke – serving four consecutive terms on child abuse charges, which in practice means between 4 and 30 years total, at the parole board's discretion
- Jodi Hildebrandt – serving four consecutive terms on child abuse charges, which in practice means between 4 and 30 years total, at the parole board's discretion
- Megan Huntsman – serial perpetrator of neonatal infanticide serving 15 to life
- Troy Kell – serving a death sentence for murder
- Dan Charles Lafferty – serving a life sentence for murder
- Ralph Menzies – died of natural causes on November 26, 2025, had been serving a death sentence for murder
- Von Lester Taylor – serving a death sentence for murder
- Kouri Richins – serving life without parole for murder

=== Executed ===
- Taberon Honie – executed on August 8, 2024, for murder

== See also ==
- List of Utah state prisons
- Capital punishment in Utah
