= Utah Department of Corrections =

- Abbreviation: UDC

Agency overview
- Volunteers: 2,400

Jurisdictional structure
- Operations jurisdiction: Utah, US
- Map of Utah Department of Corrections's jurisdiction
- Area: 84,889 square miles (219,860 km^{2})
- Population: 3,216,857(2019 est.)
- General nature: Civilian police

Operational structure
- Headquarters: Draper, Utah
- Elected officer responsible: Governor of Utah, Spencer Cox
- Agency executives: Jared Garcia, Executive Director; James Hudspeth, Deputy Director

Facilities
- Correctional facilities Community correctional centers: 2 6

Website
- UDC website

The Utah Department of Corrections (UDC) is a government agency dedicated to the management and supervision of convicted felons in the U.S. state of Utah. It is currently led by the Executive Director Jared Garcia. It has its headquarters in the Utah Department of Corrections Administration Building in Draper.

== Divisions ==
The Utah Department of Corrections is made up of several divisions and facilities.

=== Adult Probation and Parole ===
This division supervises 18,000 offenders in the community. The division has five Community Correctional Centers: Bonneville, Atherton, Orange Street, Northern Utah Correctional Center, and the Fortitude Treatment Center. Boundaries are divided into five regions. Each region within the division of AP&P has agents and correctional officers who perform a variety of functions in the courts and in the field. AP&P agents are certified law enforcement officers and have statewide police authority. In addition to supervising offenders in the field, AP&P agents are responsible for preparing reports on offenders for district courts and the Utah Board of Pardons and Parole.

=== Division of Administrative Services ===
This division is housed in the Utah Department of Corrections Administration Building and manages the UDC Corrections Training Academy.

=== Division of Facilities Construction & Management ===
Managed by the department-wide Division of Facilities Construction & Management, this division manages construction and maintenance to UDC facilities.

=== Division of Prison Operations ===
The Division of Prison Operations or DPO manages the State of Utah's two primary correctional facilities, including the Central Utah Correctional Facility and the Utah State Correctional Facility. The state also sends more than 1,000 inmates out to county jail facilities around Utah through a jail contracting program.

=== Training ===
This division is responsible for providing staff and managers appropriate training to ensure employees are prepared to carry out appropriate duties, and supervisors are equipped to manage their staff.

=== Utah Correctional Industries ===
UCI employs prison inmates who work to produce goods such as signs, furniture and embroidery. UCI mostly provides goods and services for governmental agencies, though it also contracts with various private industry businesses on certain projects.

From 2007 to 2014, UCI ran a horse gentling operation in partnership with the Bureau of Land Management. This program has since been retired, citing ongoing budget disagreements.

=== Programming ===
The Division of Programming supplies education, cognitive restructuring, sex-offender treatment, substance-abuse treatment, and various other services to offenders both inside the prison facilities, or those in the field on supervision under the purview of Adult Probation & Parole.

== Facilities ==
See List of Utah state prisons.

== Operations ==
Utah previously required all visits between prisoners and their visitors to be conducted in the English language. After challenges from the American Civil Liberties Union (ACLU) the system ended the rule.

== Death row ==
The first two people executed in the modern era were Antelope and Long Hair, who were executed at the Sugar House Prison in Sugar House, Salt Lake City on September 15, 1854. From 1951 to 2022, executions were held at the Utah State Prison in Draper, Utah. The first execution at Utah State was #38 Eliseo J. Mares Jr., and the last execution at Utah State was #51 Ronnie Lee Gardner. From July 2022, executions will be held at the Utah State Correctional Facility in Salt Lake City.

== Fallen officers ==
Since the establishment of the Utah Department of Corrections, five officers have died while on duty.

== See also ==
- List of United States state correction agencies
- List of law enforcement agencies in Utah
- List of Utah state prisons
- Prison
