= Mac Christensen =

American businessman (1934–2019)

- Born: Fred Macray Christensen; May 11, 1934; Salina, Utah, U.S.
- Died: October 11, 2019 (aged 85); Bountiful, Utah, U.S.
- Known for: Founding clothing retailer Mr. Mac

Fred Macray Christensen (May 11, 1934 – October 11, 2019) was the founder of the Utah-based clothing retailer Mr. Mac. He also served previously as president of the Mormon Tabernacle Choir.

== Biography ==
Christensen was born in Salina, Utah. Before opening his own business, Christensen worked at a large Salt Lake City department store. In 1964, he opened Mac's Clothes Closet in Bountiful, Utah, which emphasized Mormon missionary apparel.

Christensen was a member of the Church of Jesus Christ of Latter-day Saints (LDS Church) and served as president of the Mormon Tabernacle Choir from 2000 until 2012. He also served as the director of the visitors' center at the church's Washington D.C. Temple.

Christensen served for eight years as a member of WSU's Board of Trustees.

In 2006, Christensen co-chaired Orrin Hatch's Senate re-election campaign with Stan Parish. In 2010, he co-chaired the Senate campaign of Democrat Sam Granato.

In 2011, he was awarded an honorary degree by Webster State University.

Christensen and his wife, Joan, had eight children. Their son, Steve, a Salt Lake City businessman and document dealer, was murdered by document forger Mark Hofmann in 1985. Another son, Spencer, was called in 2016 as a mission president by the LDS Church, to serve in the Arizona Tempe Mission.

Christensen died on October 11, 2019, at the age of 85.

== Sources ==
- Church News May 23, 2009
- Richard E. Turley, Jr., Victims: The LDS Church and the Mark Hoffman Case (Champaign and Chicago: University of Illinois Press,1992) p. 149-150.
