= List of Utah state prisons =

This is a complete list of state prisons in Utah. There are no federal prisons in Utah and this list does not include county jails located in the state of Utah.

As of 2010, Utah eliminated its use of private prisons for state prisoners.

== Facilities ==
- Central Utah Correctional Facility, Gunnison
- Utah State Correctional Facility, Salt Lake City

== Closed ==
- Sugar House Prison, Salt Lake City (closed 1951)
- Utah State Prison, Draper (closed 2022)
- Utah State Industrial School for juvenile delinquents

== See also ==
- List of United States state prisons
