= Capital punishment in Utah =

A reenactment of the execution of Gary Gilmore, which marked the resumption of capital punishment after the 1972-76 moratorium

Capital punishment is a legal penalty in the U.S. state of Utah.

Utah was the first state to resume executions after the 1972–1976 national moratorium on capital punishment ended with Gregg v. Georgia, when Gary Gilmore was executed by firing squad in 1977. Utah is one of only three states to have ever carried out executions by firing squad, and one of only two to do so after the moratorium ended, the other being South Carolina.

== History ==
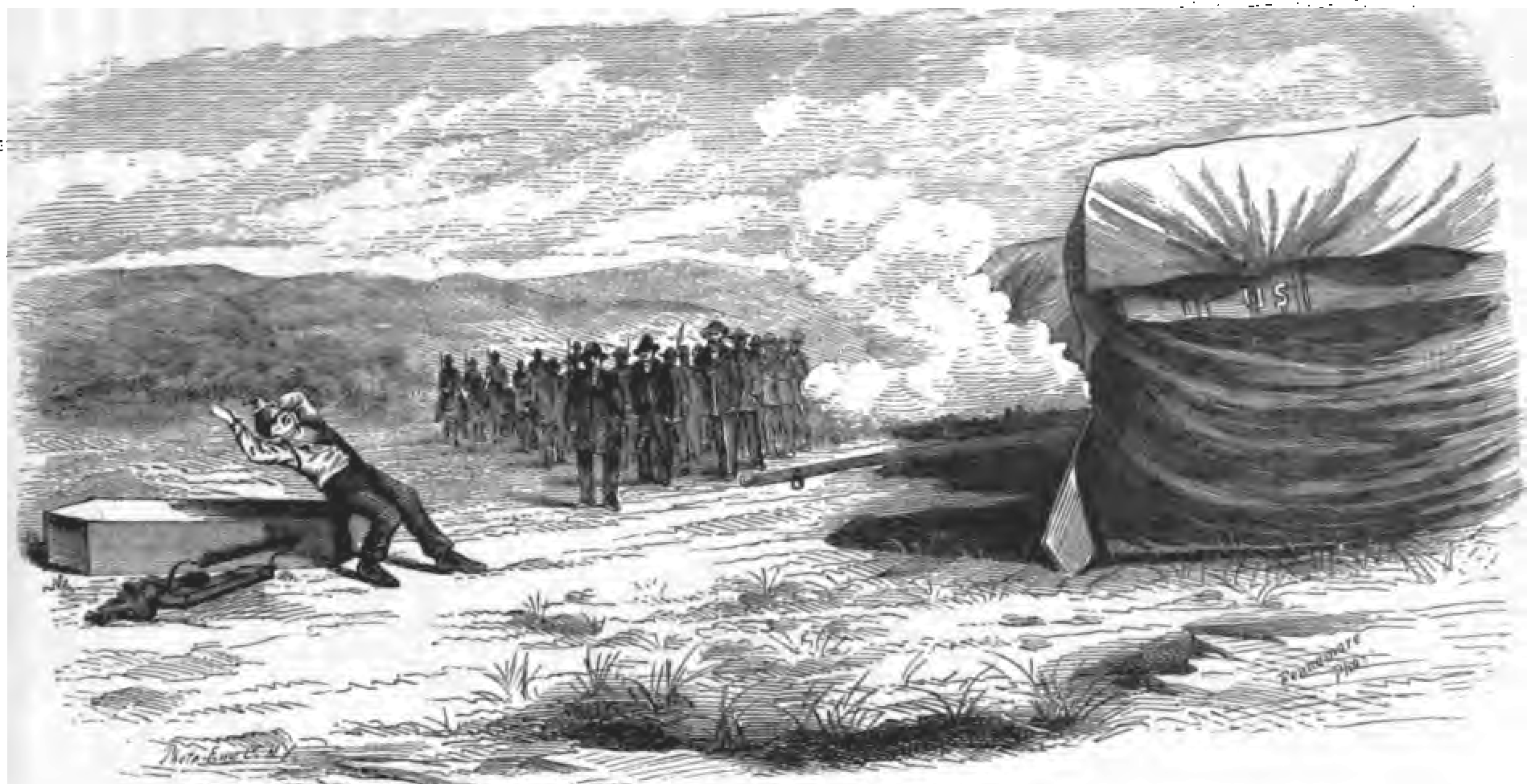
John D. Lee was executed by firing squad in 1877 for his role in the Mountain Meadows massacre.

The spring 1850 garroting of Patsowits, a Ute, was the first recorded execution in the provisional State of Deseret. Utah Territory was established in September 1850, and it permitted condemned prisoners to choose between hanging and firing squad. In 1851, beheading was introduced as a third execution option. No prisoner chose this method and the option was eliminated in 1888. In 1955, Utah state lawmakers voted to introduce the electric chair; however, the state never used electrocution due to failure to provide appropriation. Forty-four executions occurred in the State of Utah and Utah Territory before the national moratorium in 1972; six were by hanging and 38 were by firing squad. In 1958, twenty-one-year-old Barton Kay Kirkham became the last prisoner to be hanged by the state of Utah. The last pre-moratorium execution in Utah took place on March 30, 1960.

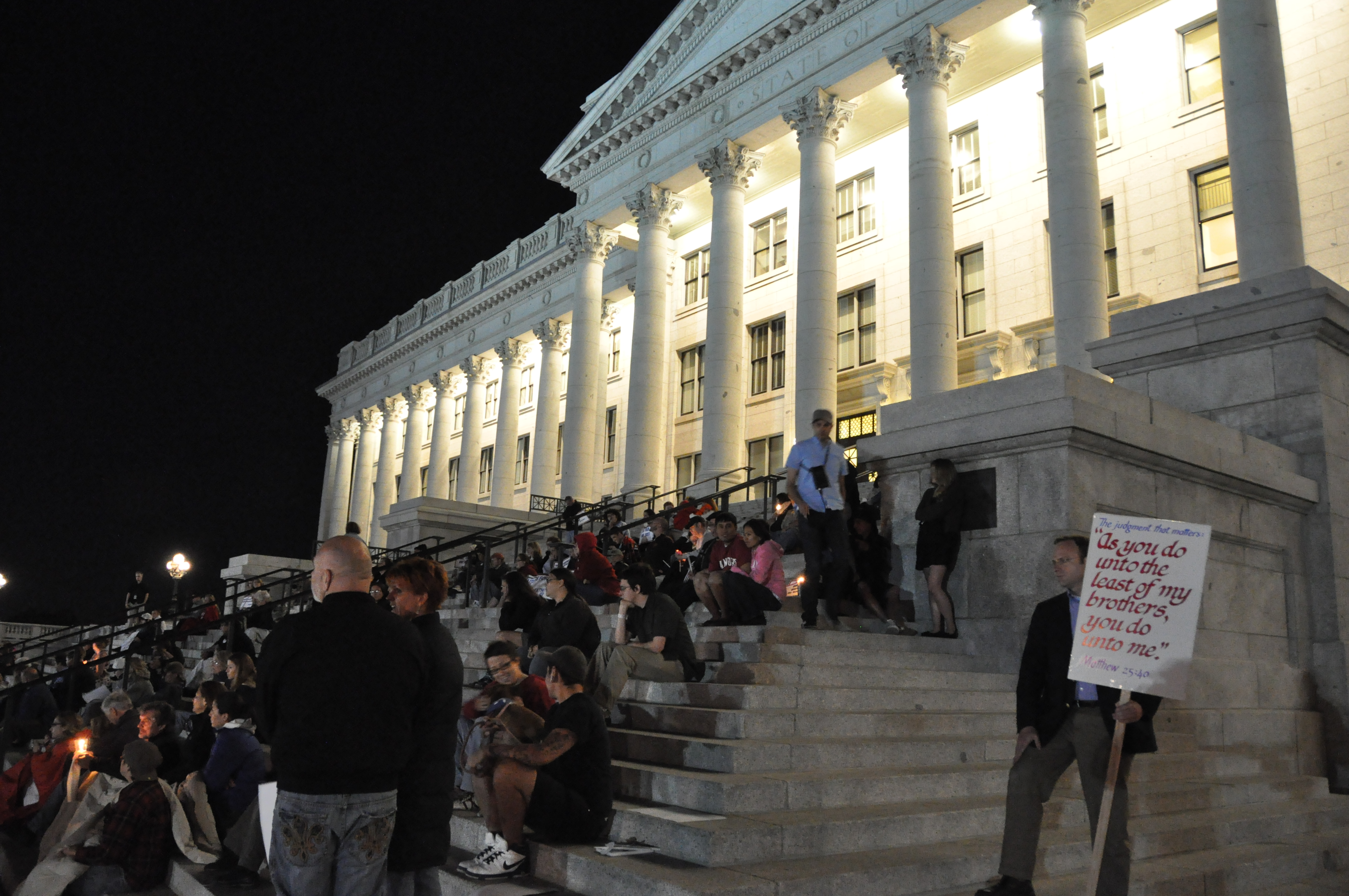
A rally at the Utah State Capitol protests the execution of Ronnie Lee Gardner.

In 1967, when the last pre-moratorium execution took place, Utah was the only remaining state to allow death row inmates to choose between firing squad and hanging. Utah attempted to reintroduce death penalty statutes during the moratorium but they were struck down by the 1972 United States Supreme Court decision in the case Furman v. Georgia. The state formally reinstated capital punishment on January 7, 1973, and the new death penalty statutes were approved by the United States Supreme Court with the reinstatement of capital punishment in 1976. The reinstatement allowed Utah to move forward with the death sentences of Dale Selby Pierre and William Andrews for crimes committed in 1974 prior to the reinstatement of capital punishment. They were later executed in 1987 and 1992, respectively. On January 17, 1977, Utah became the first state to execute a prisoner after the moratorium ended: Gary Gilmore was executed by a firing squad, having selected that method over hanging. Lethal injection was introduced in 1980 and in February of that year, the Utah State Legislature replaced the option of hanging with the option of lethal injection.

The first bill proposing to eliminate the firing squad option was introduced in the Utah House of Representatives in January 1996. In 2004, the legislature passed HB180, which removed the right of the condemned to choose the method of execution and left lethal injection as the only remaining option in the state. The abolition of the firing squad was not retroactive; three inmates on death row at Utah State Prison who chose this method of execution before the end of February 2004 were to be executed by firing squad under a grandfather clause. The execution of 49-year-old Ronnie Lee Gardner on June 18, 2010, was the state's third execution by firing squad since the capital punishment moratorium was lifted, and the country's first sanctioned shooting in 14 years.

Legislation signed by Utah Governor Gary Herbert in March 2015 restores the firing squad as a legal method of execution, requiring its use if the state is unable to obtain the necessary lethal injection drugs within 30 days of a scheduled execution.

Utah is the only state besides Nevada and South Carolina to have ever used the firing squad. As of November 2025, three inmates remain on death row following the death of Ralph Menzies, the execution of Taberon Honie, and the overturning of Douglas Lovell's and Douglas Stewart Carter's death sentences by the Utah Supreme Court. The three remaining inmates currently on Utah's death row are Michael Anthony Archuleta, Von Lester Taylor, and Troy Kell.

== Method ==
The primary method of execution is lethal injection, however firing squad is also an alternative legal method of execution under Utah law. The firing squad is to be used if an inmate sentenced prior to 2004 affirmatively elected firing squad as their preferred method of execution or if, within 30 days of the scheduled execution date, the state cannot obtain the necessary substances to carry out the sentence by lethal injection for an inmate who was sentenced after 2004, or was sentenced prior to 2004 and either affirmatively elected lethal injection or declined to choose a preferred method of execution.

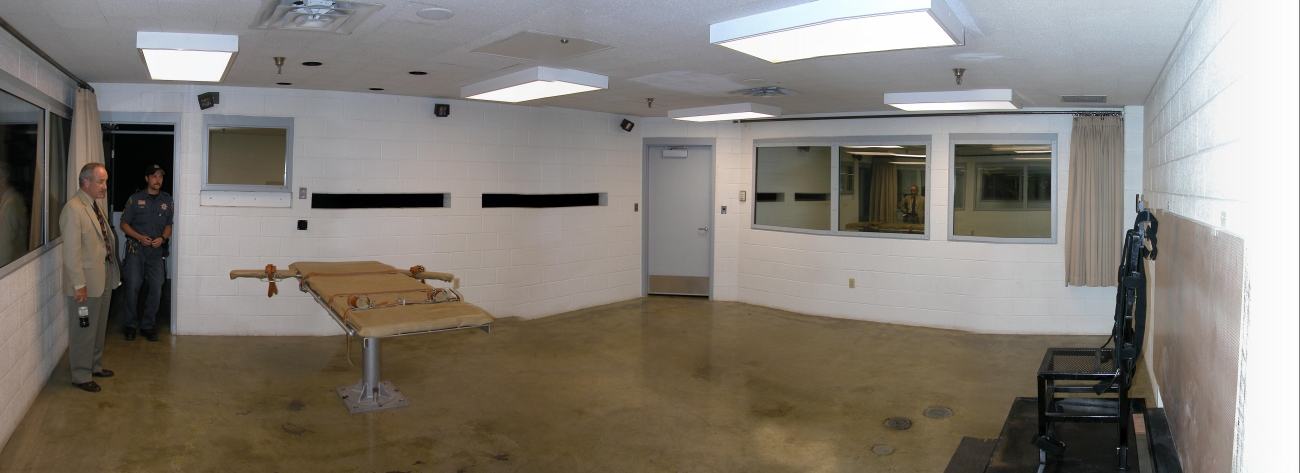
The execution chamber in the former Utah State Prison. The gurney to the left is used for lethal injection, and the metal chair to the right is used for execution by firing squad. This facility was decommissioned in 2022 with the opening of the Utah State Correctional Facility, however the same gurney and the metal chair were moved to the similarly modelled new execution chamber.

Executions in Utah are currently performed at Utah State Correctional Facility in Salt Lake City, with the first execution being carried out in 2024 in the new execution chamber. Prior to July 2022, they were carried out at the Utah State Prison in Draper. Because the ethics standards of the American Medical Association forbid physician involvement in executions, other healthcare professionals including paramedics and nurses perform executions in Utah. Paramedics and nurses, however, are also forbidden from participation in executions by their own professional organizations' ethics codes. The prison protects the anonymity of professionals involved in executions, making it impossible for professional organizations to impose sanctions.

== Capital crimes ==
Under Utah law, aggravated murder is the only crime subject to the penalty of death. It is defined as follows:

1. The murder was committed by a person who is confined in a jail or other correctional institution;
2. The murder was committed incident to one act, scheme, course of conduct, or criminal episode during which two or more persons were killed, or during which the murderer attempted to kill one or more persons in addition to the victim who was killed;
3. The murderer knowingly created a great risk of death to a person other than the victim and the murderer;
4. The murder was committed incident to an act, scheme, course of conduct, or criminal episode during which the murderer committed or attempted to commit aggravated robbery, robbery, rape, rape of a child, object rape, object rape of a child, forcible sodomy, sodomy upon a child, forcible sexual abuse, sexual abuse of a child, aggravated sexual abuse of a child, child abuse, aggravated sexual assault, aggravated arson, arson, aggravated burglary, burglary, aggravated kidnapping, or kidnapping, or child kidnapping;
5. The murder was committed incident to one act, scheme, course of conduct, or criminal episode during which the murderer committed the crime of abuse or desecration of a dead human body;
6. The murder was committed for the purpose of avoiding or preventing an arrest of the defendant or another by a peace officer acting under color of legal authority or for the purpose of effecting the defendant's or another's escape from lawful custody;
7. The murder was committed for pecuniary gain;
8. The murderer committed, or engaged or employed another person to commit the homicide pursuant to an agreement or contract for remuneration or the promise of remuneration for commission of the homicide;
9. The murderer previously committed or was convicted of aggravated murder, attempted aggravated murder, murder, attempted murder, or an offense committed in another jurisdiction which if committed in this state would be one of these;
10. The murderer was previously convicted of a specified felony such as child rape;
11. The murder was committed for the purpose of:
  - preventing a witness from testifying;
  - retaliating against a person for testifying, providing evidence, or participating in any legal proceedings or official investigation; or
  - disrupting or hindering any lawful governmental function or enforcement of laws;
12. The victim is or has been a local, state, or federal public official, or a candidate for public office, and the homicide is based on, is caused by, or is related to that official position, act, capacity, or candidacy;
13. The victim is or has been a peace officer, law enforcement officer, executive officer, prosecuting officer, jailer, prison official, firefighter, judge or other court official, juror, probation officer, or parole officer, and the victim is either on duty or the homicide is based on, is caused by, or is related to that official position, and the murderer knew, or reasonably should have known, that the victim holds or has held that official position;
14. The homicide was committed:
  - by means of a destructive device, bomb, explosive, incendiary device, or similar device which was planted, hidden, or concealed in any place, area, dwelling, building, or structure, or was mailed or delivered;
  - by means of any weapon of mass destruction; or
  - to target a law enforcement officer;
15. The murder was committed during the act of unlawfully assuming control of any aircraft, train, or other public conveyance by use of threats or force with intent to obtain any valuable consideration for the release of the public conveyance or any passenger, crew member, or any other person aboard, or to direct the route or movement of the public conveyance or otherwise exert control over the public conveyance;
16. The murder was committed by means of the administration of a poison or of any lethal substance or of any substance administered in a lethal amount, dosage, or quantity;
17. The victim was a person held or otherwise detained as a shield, hostage, or for ransom;
18. The murder was committed in an especially heinous, atrocious, cruel, or exceptionally depraved manner, any of which must be demonstrated by physical torture, serious physical abuse, or serious bodily injury of the victim before death;
19. The murderer dismembers, mutilates, or disfigures the victim's body, whether before or after death, in a manner demonstrating the murderer's depravity of mind; or
20. The victim, at the time of the death was younger than 14 years of age and was not an unborn child.

== Legal process ==
Under Utah law, the death penalty may only be imposed for aggravated murder if the prosecution files a formal notice of intent to seek the death penalty.

=== Notice of intent to seek the death penalty ===
- Must be filed within 60 days after arraignment.
- May be extended by written stipulation or court finding of good cause.
- No plea to a lesser charge may be accepted without the prosecutor’s consent during this period.

=== Limits on capital sentencing ===
- If the state does not file notice, or if the defendant was under 18 at the time of the offense, the charge becomes a noncapital first-degree felony.

=== Special mitigation ===
- If proven by a preponderance of the evidence, the offense is reduced to murder or attempted murder.

=== Affirmative defense ===
- If the defendant had a reasonable but mistaken belief that their conduct was legally justified, the prosecution must disprove the defense beyond a reasonable doubt.

=== Sentencing procedure and clemency ===
- The jury must unanimously find aggravating factors and recommend the death penalty
- If the jury deadlocks on sentencing, life imprisonment is imposed
- Only the Utah Board of Pardons and Parole may grant clemency

== See also ==
- List of people executed in Utah
- List of death row inmates in the United States § Utah
- Crime in Utah
