= Utah Board of Pardons and Parole =

Parole board for the U.S. state of Utah

Logo of the Utah Board of Pardons and Parole

The Utah Board of Pardons and Parole is the parole board for the U.S. state of Utah. It also considers cases for pardons. The board has five full time members, serving staggered five year terms, and can also have up to five pro tempore members. It is based in Murray, Utah.

The board is created under Article VII, Section 12 of the Constitution of Utah. The legislation establishing the board and granting its powers is Chapter 27 of the Utah Code of Criminal Procedure.

Scott Stephenson was appointed as chair of the Board of Pardons and Parole in October 2023.
