= Ralph Menzies =

American convicted murderer (1958–2025)

- Mug shot of Menzies
- Born: Ralph Leroy Menzies; April 21, 1958; Utah, U.S.
- Died: November 26, 2025 (aged 67); Utah, U.S.
- Convictions: Capital murder Aggravated kidnapping Aggravated robbery (2 counts); Attempted theft
- Penalty: Death by firing squad (March 23, 1988)

Details
- Victims: Maurine Hunsaker, 26
- Date: February 23, 1986
- Location: Kearns, Utah
- Imprisoned at: Utah State Correctional Facility

Ralph Leroy Menzies (April 21, 1958 – November 26, 2025) was an American convicted murderer who was on death row in Utah for the 1986 murder of Maurine Hunsaker (February 28, 1959 – February 25, 1986), a gas station attendant whom he kidnapped before slitting her throat. Menzies was convicted of the murder and sentenced to death on March 23, 1988. His scheduled September 5, 2025, execution was put on hold for a competency re-evaluation. Before the competency evaluation could be completed, Menzies died of natural causes.

When Douglas Stewart Carter's death sentence was overturned in May 2025, Menzies became Utah's longest-serving death row inmate, having been sentenced to death in 1988.

== Early life and criminal history ==
Ralph Leroy Menzies was born in Utah, United States, on April 21, 1958. He came from a dysfunctional family. Menzies was reportedly subjected to relentless child abuse by his stepfathers: they assaulted him, refused to give him food, forced him to sleep in a small room with his sister for three years, and prevented him from going to school. As a result of the abuse, the early death of his biological mother, and his sister's need to take care of their younger brother, who was in poor health, Menzies grew up without a proper caretaker or parental figure. Menzies's school records showed that he had a poor track record of attendance.

In 1976, Menzies was first convicted of aggravated robbery and sentenced to a term of five years to life in prison. Two years later, on July 6, 1978, Menzies and another prisoner, Johnny Ray Sloan, escaped from Utah State Prison, and a week later, on July 17, 1978, Menzies robbed and shot a taxi driver with a shotgun. For this crime, Menzies was put on trial, but his case was declared a mistrial after the jury deadlocked on the verdict in October 1978. Subsequently, in February 1979, Menzies was given another five years to life prison term for aggravated robbery, in addition to a concurrent sentence of one to 15 years for escaping prison. The ruling was upheld in 1980 after Menzies lost his appeal.

Four years later, Menzies was paroled on October 9, 1984, and he was caught a year later, in December 1985, for stealing Christmas decorations. Menzies pleaded guilty to attempted theft on February 10, 1986, and he was scheduled for sentencing on March 11, 1986. He was subsequently released on bail on February 20, 1986.

== Murder of Maurine Hunsaker ==
=== Disappearance and death of Hunsaker ===
On February 23, 1986, 26-year-old Maurine Forschen Hunsaker went missing from her job at a gas station in Kearns, Utah. During the evening, Hunsaker's husband, Jim, called her, but she did not answer the phone. When Jim arrived at her workplace that night, he found that his wife, her purse, and US$116 from the cash register were missing. Later, at around 11:05 p.m., Jim received a phone call from Hunsaker, who sounded upset and scared. Hunsaker reportedly told her husband that she was kidnapped by someone who wanted to rob her, and that she would be released soon. An officer who joined Jim for the phone conversation heard Hunsaker say that she was robbed. However, the phone call was cut before both Jim and the officer could ask her any further questions.

Two days later, on February 25, 1986, near the Storm Mountain picnic area in Big Cottonwood Canyon, a hiker discovered Hunsaker's body. Her throat was slit, and her wrists were covered with ligature marks, suggesting she had been tied up, likely to a nearby tree with scuffed bark. An autopsy report showed that Hunsaker died as a result of ligature strangulation, and the slit wound had a contributory effect to her death.

=== Investigations and arrest of Menzies ===
Subsequently, the police investigations managed to link Menzies to the murder. Menzies, who was booked on unrelated burglary charges and detained on February 24, 1986, was found to have four of Hunsaker's identification cards in his possession, after a jailer found them in a laundry hamper located in the changing room Menzies used during the screening. Furthermore, two high-school students, Tim Larrabee and Beth Brown, saw two people at Storm Mountain on the morning of February 24 after Hunsaker's disappearance; one of these people matched Hunsaker's description, and the other, whom Larrabee described as a "White male" with black curly hair and beard, was aged 25 to 36, weighed approximately 170 lb (77 kg) and was 6 ft 1 in (1.85 m) tall, roughly fit the description of Menzies.

Additionally, Troy Denter, a friend of Menzies, told police that he loaned his car, a cream-colored 1974 Chevrolet, to him on the day of the murder, and Larrabee saw a car resembling Denter's on the same date he saw Hunsaker and Menzies together; Brown corroborated Larrabee's testimony after identifying the car as the one Menzies borrowed from Denter. When the police questioned Menzies after obtaining the witness testimonies, Menzies denied that he was involved in the murder. He said that on the night he borrowed Denter's car, he picked up a woman on State Street and then picked up his girlfriend, Nicole Arnold. Menzies claimed he drove around with both women in the car until they began to fight. Menzies said he dropped off Arnold first before he stopped at somewhere around 7200 West and 2400 South to drop the other woman off. Menzies stated that he returned home to talk to Arnold.

The police later searched Menzies's apartment and recovered Hunsaker's purse along with some of the money missing from the cash register at her workplace. A Buck knife was also retrieved; after comparison with the injuries, it was determined to be capable of inflicting the cuts on Hunsaker's neck. A DNA test later confirmed that Denter's car contained Hunsaker's fingerprint.

With the evidence obtained so far, Menzies was arrested and charged with the murder of Maurine Hunsaker. Sometime after Menzies was charged, more evidence linking him to the murder emerged. A cellmate of Menzies, Walter Britton, contacted the police and told them that Menzies admitted to killing Hunsaker during a conversation with him, and that Menzies allegedly claimed that slitting Hunsaker's throat gave him one of the biggest thrills of his life. However, the cellmate later signed a sworn declaration retracting this testimony.

The father of Nicole Arnold also discovered Hunsaker's Social Security card in his daughter's possession.

== Murder trial ==
Menzies eventually stood trial before a jury on February 18, 1988. Menzies faced one count of aggravated murder and one count of kidnapping; Salt Lake County prosecutors sought the death penalty under Utah state law for the aggravated murder charge. Jury selection commenced on February 4, 1988.

During the trial, the prosecution argued that Menzies had kidnapped and murdered Maurine Hunsaker from her workplace in the suburban town of Kearns, Utah and held her hostage at Big Cottonwood Canyon overnight, before he strangled Hunsaker and slit her throat, and sought a conviction of first degree murder, but the defense argued that Menzies should be convicted of second degree murder, a lesser charge that did not carry the death penalty, after they made arguments to dispute the elements of the charge, where the existence of a robbery or kidnapping during the course of murder was required to make it a capital crime.

On March 8, 1988, following a month-long trial, the jury found Menzies guilty of first degree murder and aggravated kidnapping. Menzies waived his right to be sentenced by a jury and allowed a judge to decide his sentence instead. The defense argued that Menzies should be spared the death penalty and handed a life sentence instead, as he was mentally ill and had had an abusive childhood and should be given judicial mercy on humanitarian grounds. However, the prosecution sought the death penalty, stating that it was appropriate because Menzies had a long criminal history, there was little to no rehabilitative effect observed during his previous prison stints, and he had continued to commit robbery even after being harshly dealt with by the law.

On March 23, 1988, Judge Raymond Uno sentenced Menzies to death for the murder of Hunsaker, and at the sentencing hearing Menzies chose death by firing squad as the method for his execution. His execution date was scheduled for May 20, 1988, but it was stayed pending mandatory review by the Utah Supreme Court.

== Post-conviction legal process ==
After his sentencing in 1988, Menzies remained on death row for more than three decades, and throughout these years, he filed multiple appeals against his death sentence. It was scheduled to be carried out at least twice but delayed due to his appeals.

On March 11, 1992, the Utah Supreme Court rejected Menzies's appeal for a retrial, finding that the use of an unlicensed court reporter named Tauni Lee, whom transcribed the capital murder trial, did not provide sufficient grounds to reopen his case. It was proven that Lee made a large number of mistakes and was shown to have omitted discussions from the transcribed records.

On March 29, 1994, the Utah Supreme Court dismissed Menzies's appeal and upheld his conviction and sentence.

A year later, Menzies received his death warrant, scheduling his sentence to be carried out via firing squad on June 2, 1995. On May 4, 1995, Menzies managed to obtain a stay of execution due to pending appeals. Hunsaker's parents expressed disappointment that Menzies would not be executed.

On May 16, 1996, Menzies's request for a federal public defender was rejected by U.S. Magistrate Ronald Boyce since his state appeals were not yet exhausted at this point.

Menzies was then scheduled to be executed on November 10, 2003, but the execution date was ultimately stayed for legal reasons. Another appeal was rejected on February 27, 2004. Menzies's motion requesting for DNA testing was rejected in October 2004. In response to the repeated delays, Hunsaker's oldest son Matt, who was ten when his mother died, lamented the long period of time that lapsed since his mother's murder and wanted justice to be served.

On April 2, 2012, Menzies's appeal over alleged ineffective representation by legal counsel was turned down by the 3rd District Judge Bruce C. Lubeck.

On September 23, 2014, the Utah Supreme Court rejected Menzies's appeal.

On January 12, 2019, U.S. District Judge Claire Eagan rejected an appeal.

On November 7, 2022, the 10th Circuit Court of Appeals dismissed Menzies's appeal for post-conviction relief.

On October 18, 2023, the U.S. Supreme Court refused to allow Menzies's appeal, which exhausted all of his standard appeals.

On December 23, 2023, a lawsuit filed by Menzies and four other condemned prisoners against Utah's death penalty laws was dismissed by Judge Coral Sanchez of Utah's 3rd Circuit Court.

== Competency hearing and motion for death warrant ==
=== First execution warrant application ===
On January 17, 2024, the state lawyers of Utah announced that they were seeking an execution date for Menzies, who had selected to die by firing squad. Since Menzies was sentenced to death before May 2004, he was allowed to choose between lethal injection and firing squad. It was the third time the state sought to execute Menzies.

Menzies's defense counsel argued that he should not be executed because he was mentally incompetent. Menzies reportedly suffered from dementia and did not fully comprehend why he should be put to death for his crime.

An official hearing to approve Menzies's death warrant was originally supposed to commence on February 23, 2024, but ten days before the hearing, a judge cancelled the hearing and directed the state to seek an independent report on Menzies's mental competency for execution. Matt Hunsaker continued to seek justice for his mother and stated he wanted closure. Matt added that his maternal grandmother died in 2021 before she could get to see her daughter's killer executed, and he inherited his grandmother's wish to continue the pursuit for justice and fought to keep his memories of his mother alive even after 38 years since Hunsaker was murdered. He also urged the courts to ensure a speedy process to determine Menzies' competence and fate.

=== Mental competency hearing ===
On August 7, 2024, Menzies was scheduled to undergo a competency hearing on August 12, 2024. He also underwent psychiatric evaluation.

An evidentiary hearing was scheduled for November 18, 2024. On October 18, 2024, weeks before the hearing, local media reported that Menzies' counsel now alleged prosecutorial misconduct, charging that prosecutors had been communicating and coordinating with state agencies and failed to disclose this information to the defense. On November 1, 2024, Bates denied the motion to disqualify the prosecution from Menzies's competency hearing.

On November 18, 2024, Menzies's competency hearing began. Judge Bates presided the hearing. The state medical experts, neurologist Ryan Green and forensic psychologist Michael Brooks of the Utah Department of Health and Human Services, submitted that Menzies was competent to be executed. The five-day hearing concluded on November 22, 2024.

A final competency hearing was held May 7, 2025. On June 6, 2025, Bates officially ruled that Menzies was mentally competent to be executed. The judge ruled that despite the recent signs of deterioration of his cognitive abilities as a result of dementia, Menzies "consistently and rationally underst[ood]" the magnitude of his actions and there was no evidence that his execution would have violated the Eighth Amendment.

=== Second motion for execution date ===
On June 9, 2025, Utah prosecutors filed a renewed motion to issue a death warrant. At the same time, the defense counsel filed an appeal to the Utah Supreme Court against Judge Bates's ruling. The defense sought a second competency hearing, arguing that his mental state had rapidly deteriorated and made him ineligible for execution. On August 29, 2025, the Utah Supreme Court vacated Menzies' death warrant and ordered a new mental competency hearing.

== 2025 attempted execution and stay order ==
=== Death warrant ===
On July 9, 2025, Judge Matthew Bates signed a death warrant, scheduling the execution date as September 5, 2025.

Officials of the Utah Department of Corrections announced on July 14, 2025, that preparations were underway to facilitate the upcoming execution of Menzies by firing squad.

Prior to the scheduling of Menzies's death warrant, Ronnie Lee Gardner was the third and most recent person executed by firing squad in Utah. Following Gardner's execution in 2010, executions in Utah were suspended for 14 years until Taberon Honie was put to death by lethal injection in August 2024.

=== Clemency hearing and rejection ===
On July 16, 2025, Menzies's lawyers petitioned for clemency from the Utah Board of Pardons and Parole, as a final recourse to commute Menzies's death sentence to life imprisonment without the possibility of parole. A hearing was granted for Menzies but the board did not announce a date to hear Menzies's case.

Utah Governor Spencer Cox expressed support for the execution of Menzies, stating that he personally believed that the death penalty was appropriate for exceptional murder cases and it should be applied only rarely. In Utah, the governor has no authority to grant clemency and commute death sentences; instead, it is the purview of the Utah state parole board to make these decisions.

On August 14, 2025, Menzies' lawyers argued before the parole board that their client should be spared from execution on account of his poor health and good behavior in prison. On that same date, Menzies lost his petition for a second competency hearing, after Judge Matthew Bates denied the motion and ruled that he was "unpersuaded" that Menzies was mentally incompetent to be executed.

On the other hand, Maurine Hunsaker's family urged the parole board to not commute Menzies's death sentence and asked for him to be executed. They argued that they had waited for nearly 40 years for justice to finally arrive, and that granting Menzies clemency would be an affront to Hunsaker and themselves, with her widow Jim Hunsaker adding that Menzies was brutal on his late wife and their family and he deserved to be punished only by execution by firing squad. Matt Hunsaker also opposed the granting of clemency for his mother's killer, and admonished the parole board for allowing Menzies a final chance to plead for mercy on his life, given that his mother was murdered by Menzies in a brutal and callous manner; Matt also stated that he wished to see Menzies meeting his end in the execution chamber on September 5, 2025, as arranged. Matt's two younger siblings, Nicholas and Dana, who were 18 months and six months old, respectively, when Hunsaker died, similarly asked the board to refuse clemency for Menzies; Dana additionally stated that she had no memory of her mother except for the court case relating to her murder and felt that the striking resemblance to her mother aggravated the heartbreak of her family throughout the decades after the death of Hunsaker.

Ultimately, on August 19, 2025, the parole board denied clemency for Menzies, allowing his execution date to remain scheduled for September 5, 2025. However, on August 29, Menzies execution was overturned by the Utah Supreme Court to reevaluate his competency.

== Second competency hearing and death ==
On September 4, 2025, the Utah Attorney-General filed a motion, seeking to reduce the 60-day window to 30 days in the re-evaluation stage of Menzies's mental state, stating that the case had dragged on for 39 years and should be resolved as soon as possible to facilitate his death sentence, so as to avoid further dragging the case on with another series of hearings regarding Menzies's execution. Menzies's second hearing was initially scheduled for December 9–12, 2025. However, he died of undisclosed natural causes in a local hospital on November 26, 2025, before it could take place.

== See also ==
- Capital punishment in Utah
