= Execution by firing squad =

Execution by multiple shooters on command

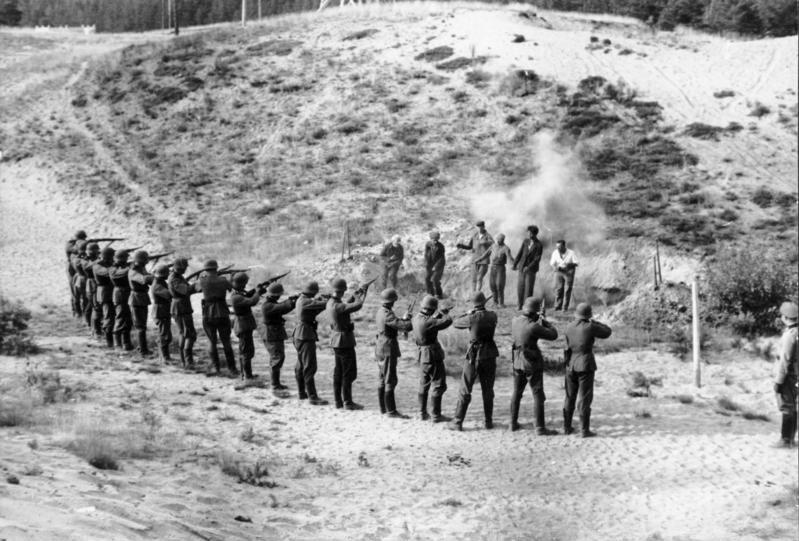
- World War II killing of Soviet civilians accused of being partisans on the Eastern Front by a German firing squad, September 1941
- Method of: Capital punishment

Execution by firing squad, historically called fusillading (from the French fusil, rifle), is a method of capital punishment, particularly common in times of war. Some reasons for its use are that firearms are usually readily available and a gunshot to a vital organ, such as the brain or heart, most often will kill relatively quickly.

== Procedure ==
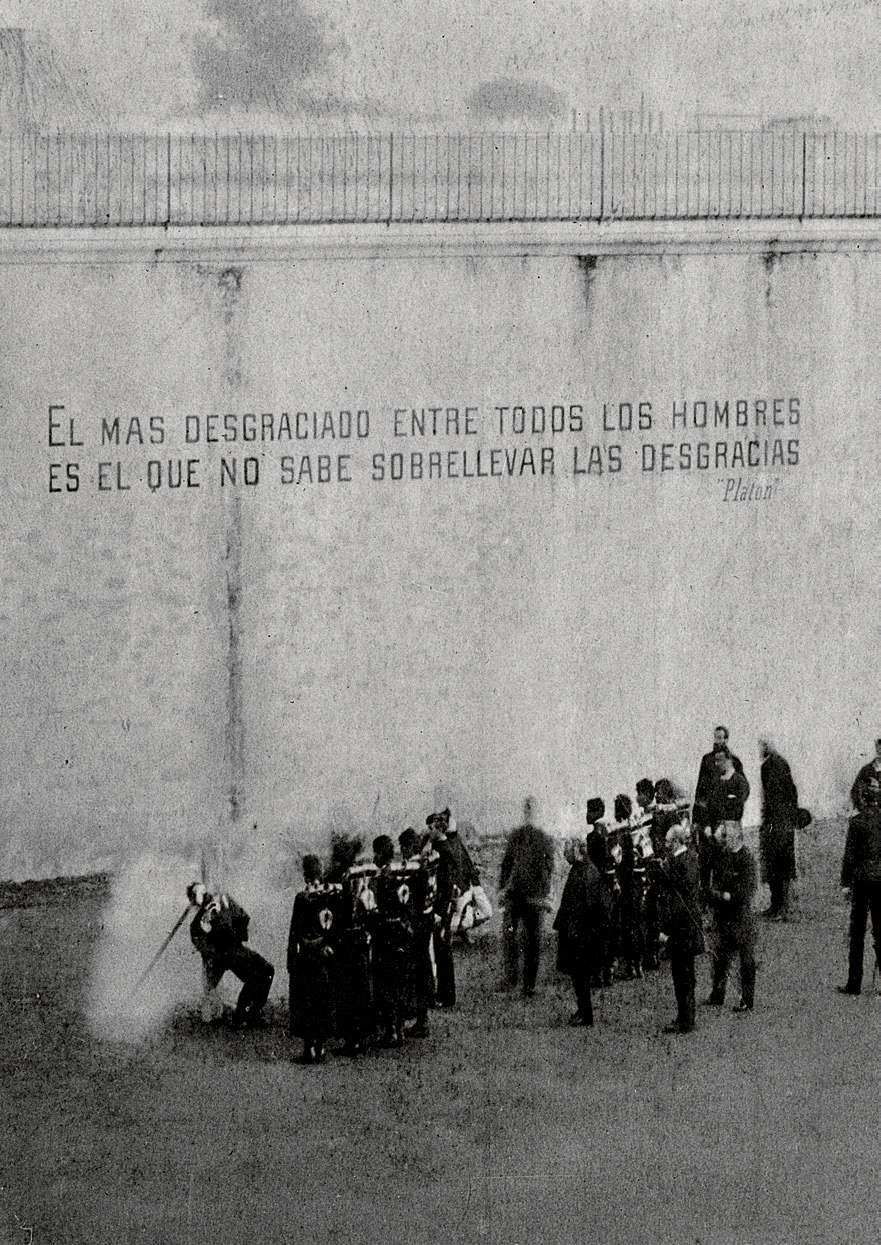
Execution of two convicted criminals in a Uruguayan prison, 1892. The prison wall displays a quote from Plato: "The most wretched amongst all men is he who cannot endure misfortune."

A firing squad is normally composed of several shooters, all of whom are usually instructed to fire simultaneously, thus preventing both disruption of the process by one member and identification of who fired the lethal shot. To avoid disfigurement due to multiple shots to the head, the shooters are typically instructed to aim at the heart, sometimes aided by a paper or cloth target. The prisoner is typically blindfolded or hooded as well as restrained. Executions can be carried out with the condemned either standing or sitting. There is a tradition in some jurisdictions that such executions are carried out at first light or at sunrise, giving rise to the phrase "shot at dawn".

Associated Press writer Jeffrey Collins described the execution by firing squad of a murderer, Brad Sigmon, in 2025 as follows:

"Mr. Sigmon’s lawyer read his final statement. The hood was put over Mr. Sigmon’s head, and an employee opened the black pull shade that shielded where the three prison-system volunteer shooters were. About two minutes later, they fired. There was no warning or countdown. The abrupt crack of the rifles startled me. And the white target with the red bull’s-eye that had been on his chest, standing out against his black prison jumpsuit, disappeared instantly as Mr. Sigmon’s whole body flinched. A jagged red spot about the size of a small fist appeared where Mr. Sigmon was shot. His chest moved two or three times. Outside of the rifle crack, there was no sound. A doctor came out in less than a minute, and his examination took about a minute more. Mr. Sigmon was declared dead at 6:08 p.m."

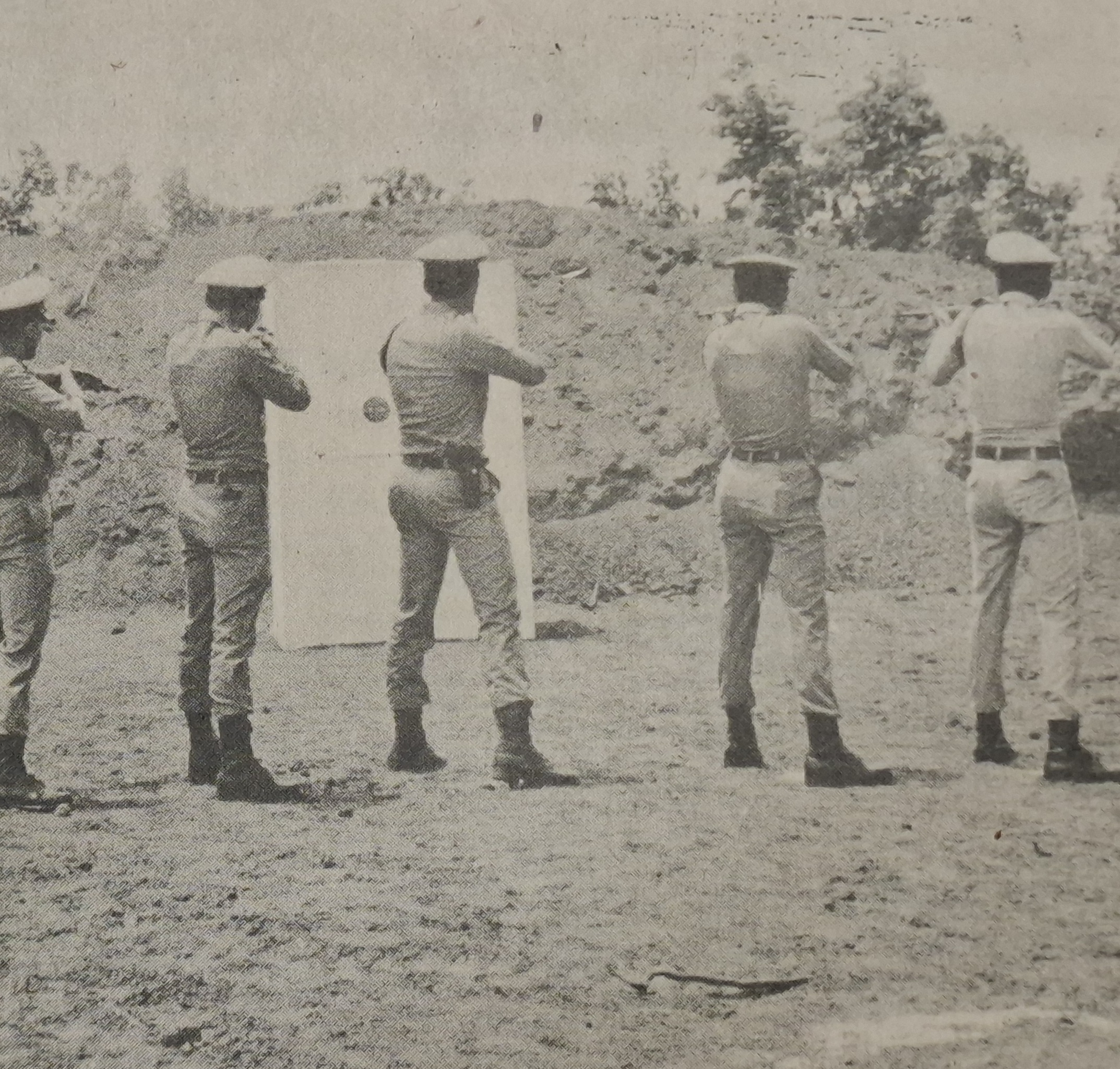
Execution of Somchai Thammawattana by firing squad in Lopburi province (5 July 1972)

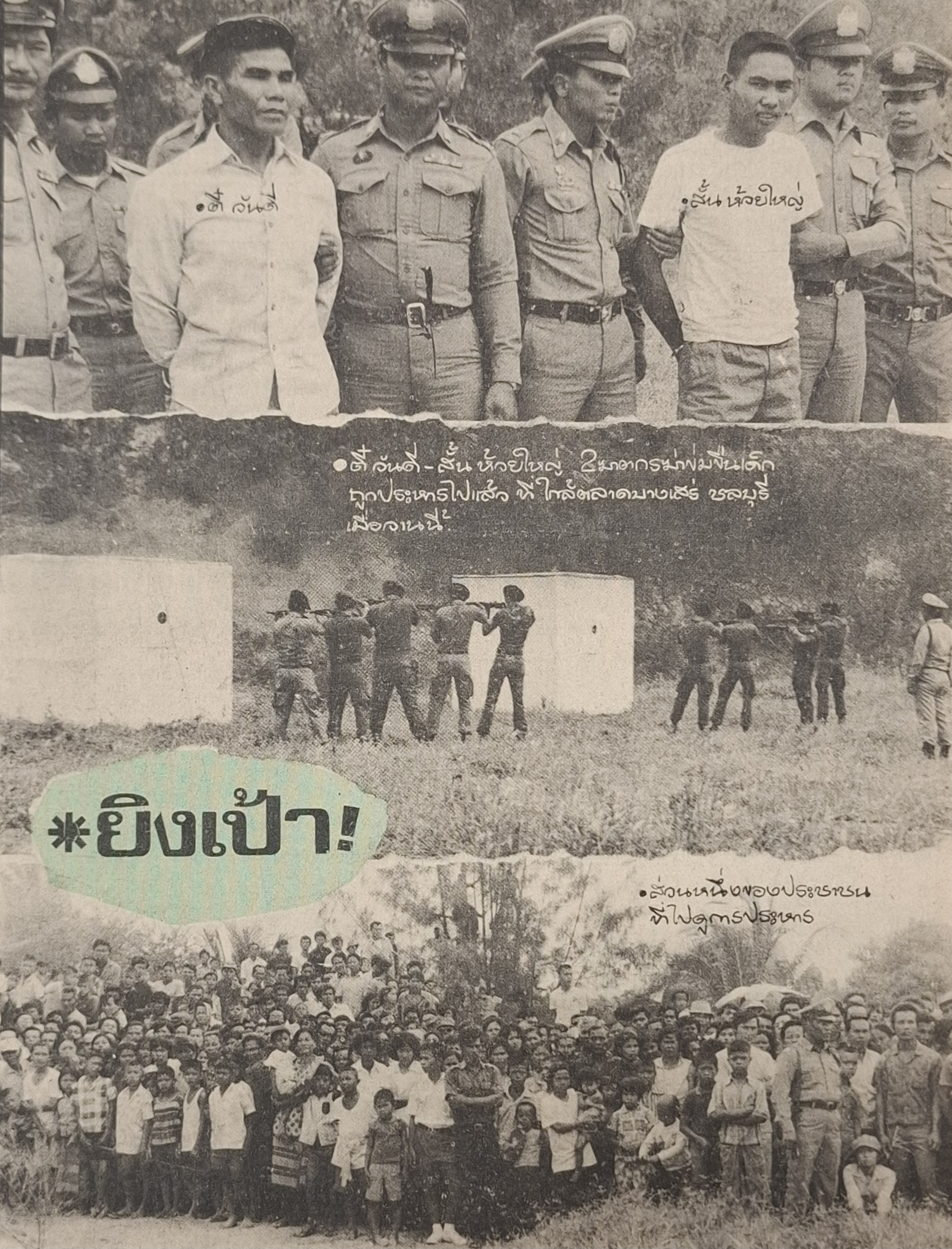
Public firing squad of Tee Wandee and San Huayai child murderers and rapists at Banphotkhiri Hill, Sattahip district, Chonburi province (August 30, 1972)

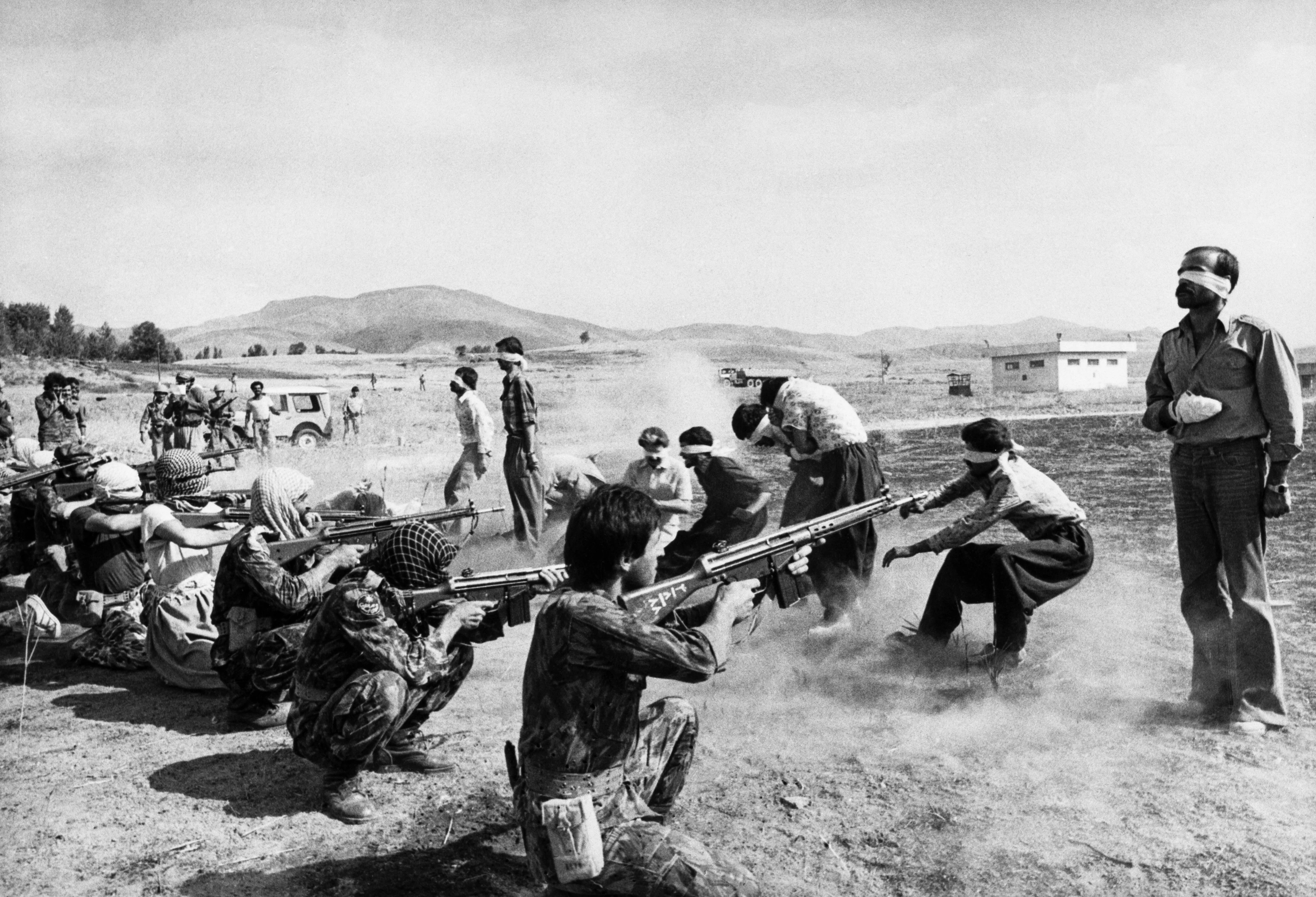
Firing squad of Iranian Government executing Kurd prisoners (27 August 1979)

Execution by firing squad is a specific practice that is distinct from other forms of execution by firearms, such as an execution by shot(s) to the back of the head or neck. However, the single shot to the brain by the squad's officer with a pistol at point blank (coup de grâce) is sometimes incorporated in a firing squad execution, particularly if the initial volley turns out not to be immediately fatal. Before the introduction of firearms, bows or crossbows were often used—Saint Sebastian is usually depicted as executed by a squad of Roman auxiliary archers in around AD 288; King Edmund the Martyr of East Anglia, by some accounts, was tied to a tree and executed by Viking archers on 20 November 869 or 870.

Sometimes, one or more of the members of the firing squad may be issued a rifle containing a blank cartridge. In such cases, the shooters are not told beforehand whether they are using live or blank ammunition. This is believed to reinforce the sense of diffusion of responsibility among the firing squad members. It provides each member with a measure of plausible deniability that they, personally, did not fire a bullet at all. In practice however, firing a live round produces significant recoil, while firing a blank round does not. In more modern times such as during the 2010 execution of Ronnie Lee Gardner in Utah, US, one rifleman may be given a "dummy" cartridge containing a wax bullet, which provides a more realistic recoil.

== Military significance ==
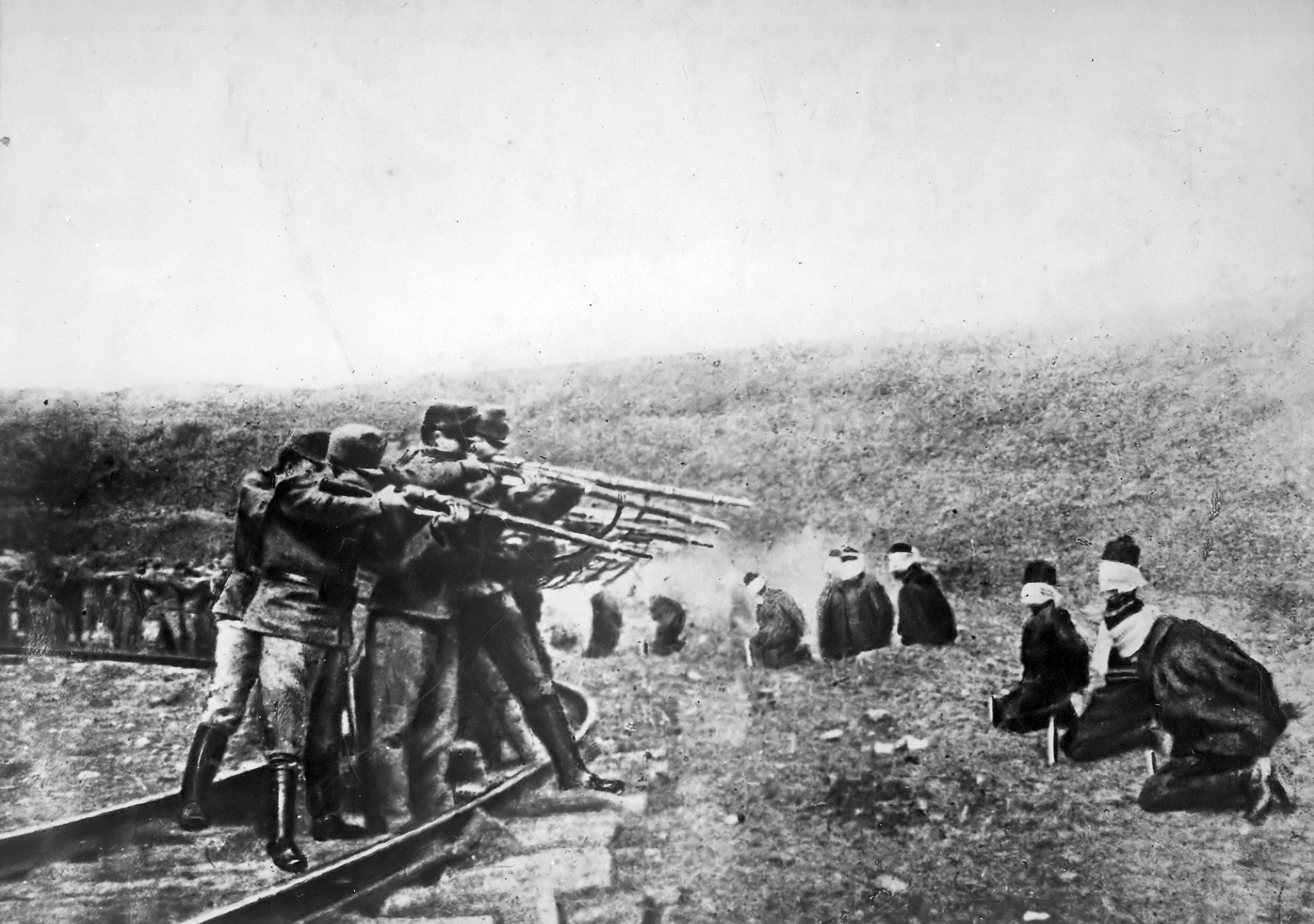
Serbian civilian prisoners arranged in a semi-circle, executed by an Austro-Hungarian firing squad in World War I

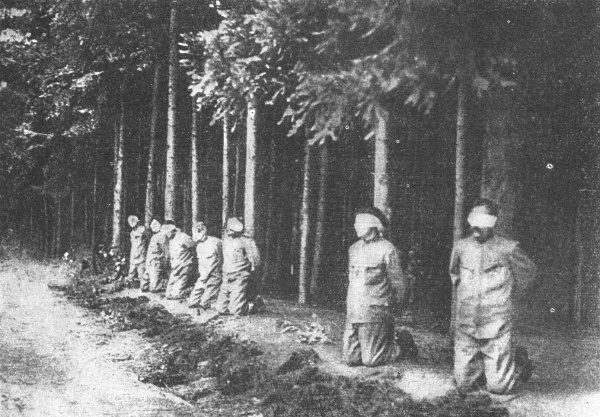
Execution by Austria-Hungary of Czech leaders of a mutiny against their superior officers, 1918

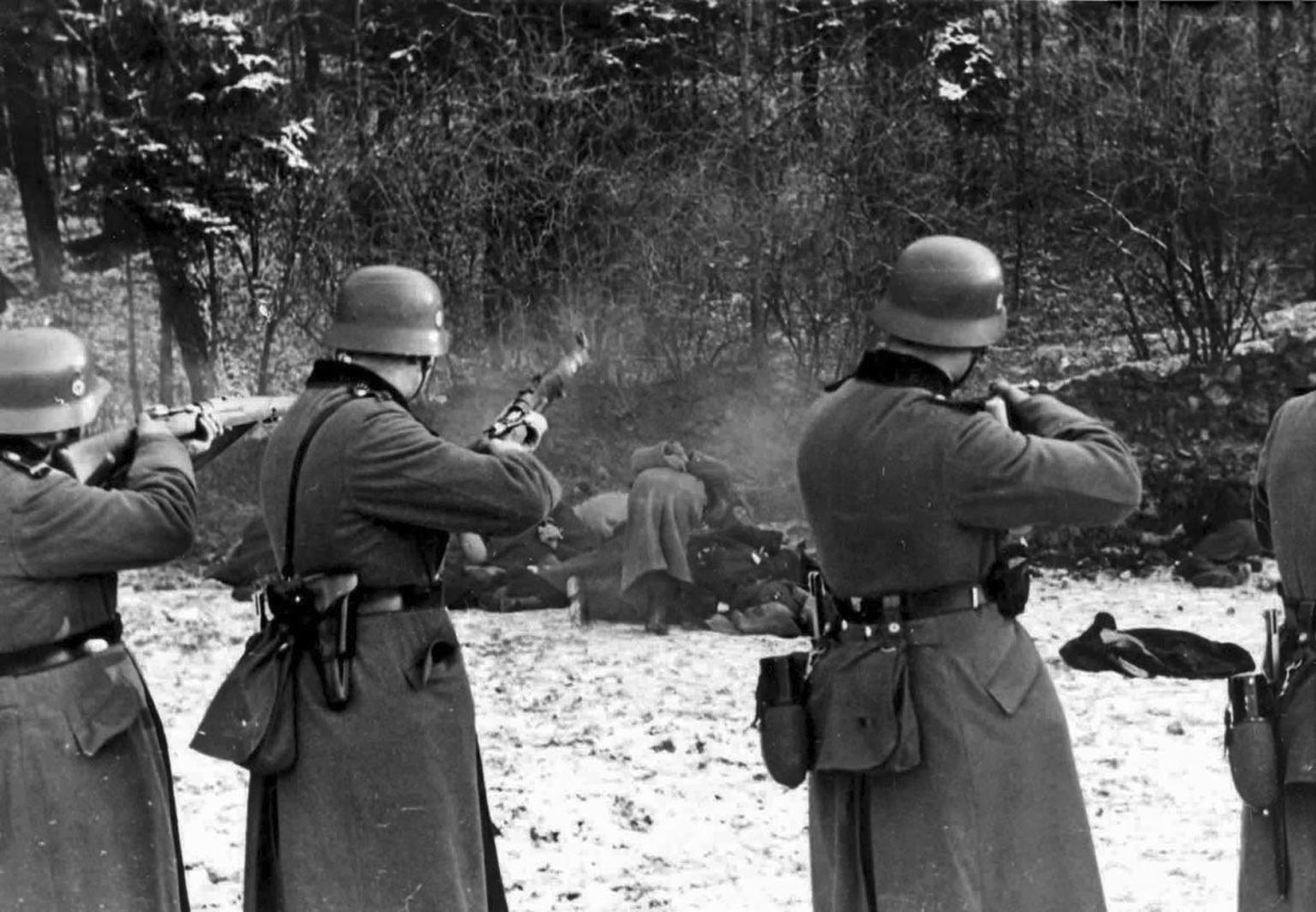
Mass execution of 56 Polish citizens in Bochnia, near Kraków, following the Nazi invasion of Poland, December 18, 1939

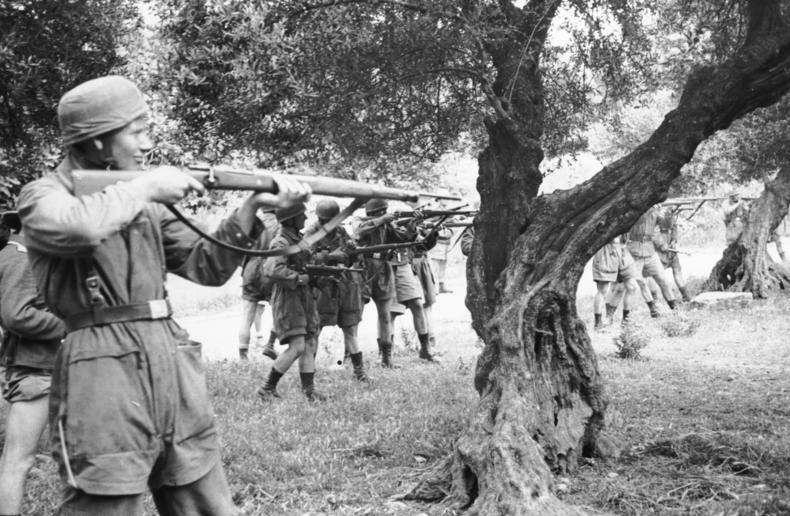
German paratroopers prepare to execute Greek civilians in the village of Kondomari, following the Battle of Crete, June 2, 1941

The method is often the capital punishment or disciplinary means employed by military courts for crimes such as cowardice, desertion, espionage, murder, mutiny, or treason.

If the condemned prisoner is an ex-officer who is acknowledged to have shown bravery throughout their career, they may be afforded the privilege of giving the order to fire. Cases of this are the executions of French Marshals Michel Ney and Joachim Murat. As a means of insulting the condemned, however, past executions have had them shot in the back, denied blindfolds, or even tied to chairs. When Galeazzo Ciano, son-in-law of Benito Mussolini, and several other former fascists who voted to remove Mussolini from power were executed, they were tied to chairs facing away from their executioners. By some reports, Ciano managed to twist his chair around at the last second to face them, but this is unconfirmed.

== By country ==
=== Andorra ===
On 18 October 1943, Pere Areny was publicly executed by firing squad in Canillo, Andorra, for the murder of his half-brother two months earlier. Areny became the last person to be put to death by Andorra. The case attracted local controversy over Areny's fast-track trial and the omission of his mental health problems as a mitigating factor.

=== Argentina ===
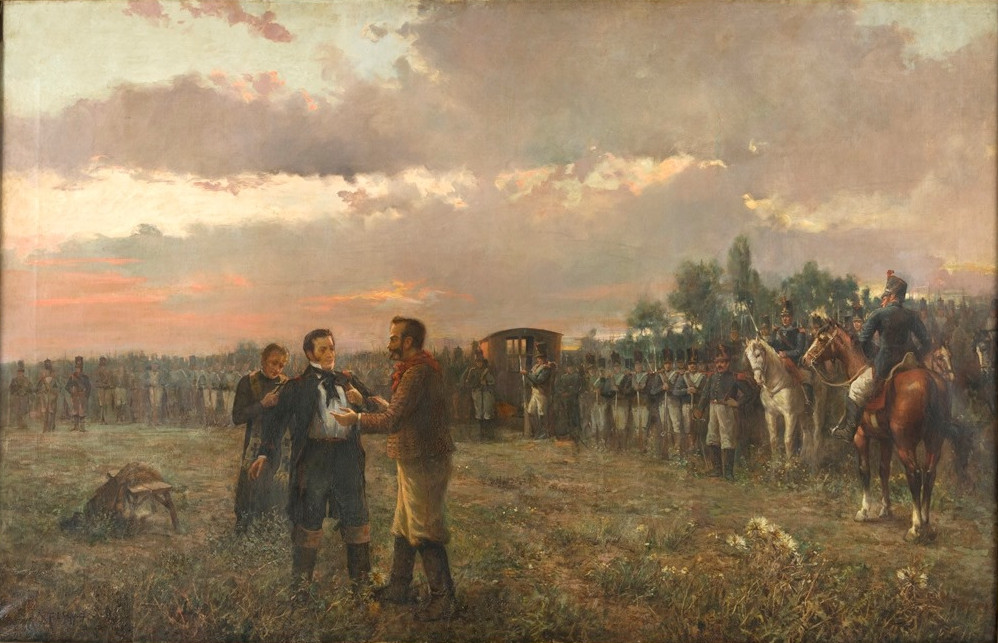
Execution of Manuel Dorrego

Manuel Dorrego, a prominent Argentine statesman and soldier who governed Buenos Aires in the 1820s, was executed by firing squad on 12 December 1828 after being defeated in battle by Juan Lavalle and later convicted of treason.

=== Belgium ===
On 12 October 1915 British nurse Edith Cavell was executed by a German firing squad at the Tir national shooting range at Schaerbeek, after being convicted of "conveying troops to the enemy" during the First World War.

On 1 April 1916 a Belgian woman, Gabrielle Petit, was executed by a German firing squad at Schaerbeek after being convicted of spying for the British Secret Service during World War I.

During the Battle of the Bulge in World War II, three captured German spies were tried and executed by a U.S. firing squad at Henri-Chapelle on 23 December 1944. Thirteen other Germans were also tried and shot at either Henri-Chapelle or Huy. These executed spies took part in Waffen-SS commando Otto Skorzeny's Operation Greif, in which English-speaking German commandos operated behind U.S. lines, masquerading in U.S. uniforms and equipment.

=== Brazil ===
The Brazilian Constitution of 1988 expressly prohibits the usage of capital punishment in peacetime, but authorizes the use of the death penalty for military crimes committed during wartime. War must be declared formally, in accordance with international law and article 84, item 19 of the Federal Constitution, with due authorization from the Brazilian Congress. The Brazilian Code of Military Penal Law, in its chapter dealing with wartime offences, specifies the crimes that are subject to the death penalty. The death penalty is never the only possible sentence for a crime, and the punishment must be imposed by the military courts system. Per the norms of the Brazilian Code of Military Penal Procedure, the death penalty is carried out by firing squad.

Although Brazil still permits the use of capital punishment during wartime, no convicts were actually executed during Brazil's last military conflict, the Second World War. The military personnel sentenced to death during World War II had their sentences reduced by the President of the Republic.

=== Cuba ===
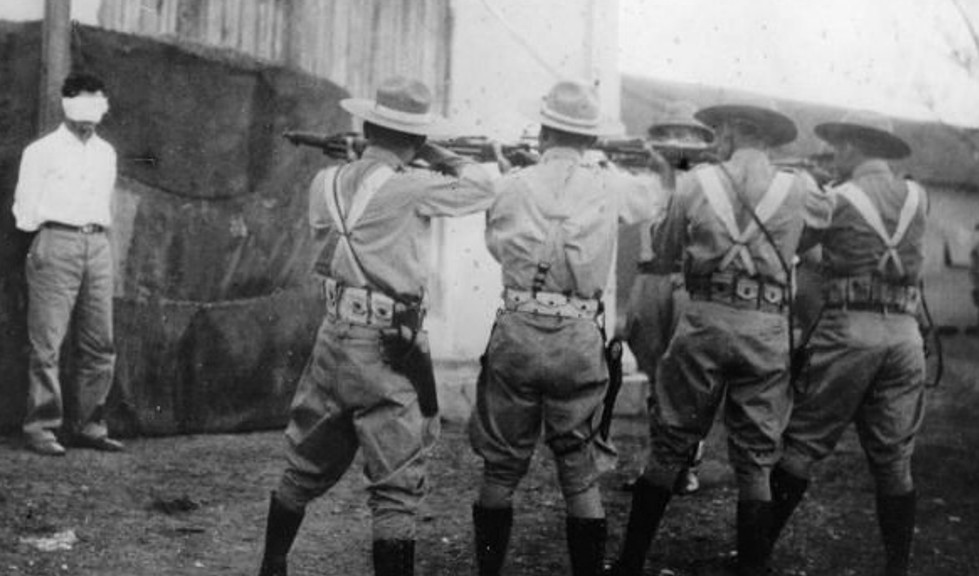
A communist insurgent is blindfolded and executed by firing squad, Cuba, 1956

Cuba, as part of its penal system, still utilizes death by firing squad, although the last recorded execution was in 2003. In January 1992, a Cuban exile convicted of "terrorism, sabotage and enemy propaganda" was executed by firing squad. The Council of State noted that the punishment served as a deterrent and stated that the death penalty "fulfills a goal of overall prevention, especially when the idea is to stop such loathsome actions from being repeated, to deter others and so to prevent innocent human lives from being endangered in the future".

During the months following the triumph of the Cuban Revolution in 1959, soldiers of the Batista government and political opponents to the revolution were executed by firing squad.

=== El Salvador ===
On 8 February 1971, agents of the National Guard carried out the public execution of Victoriano Gómez Urrutia, who became the last person to be executed by El Salvador. A firing squad shot Gómez Urrutia in a football stadium in San Miguel, executing the sentence for the murders of a woman and her underage daughter committed by Gómez Urrutia in January 1961.

=== Finland ===
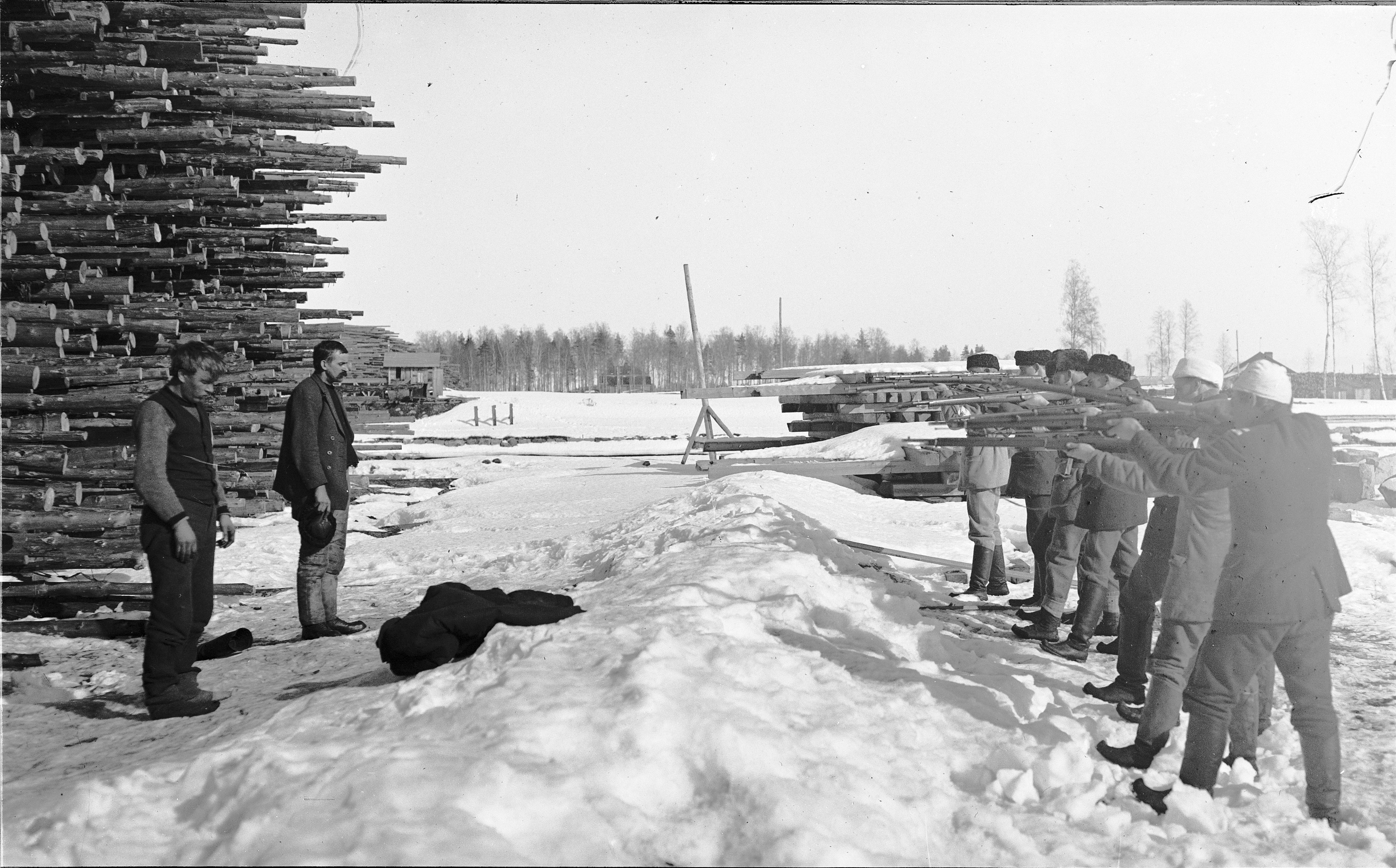
Two Red Guard members in front of a firing squad in Varkaus after the 1918 Finnish Civil War

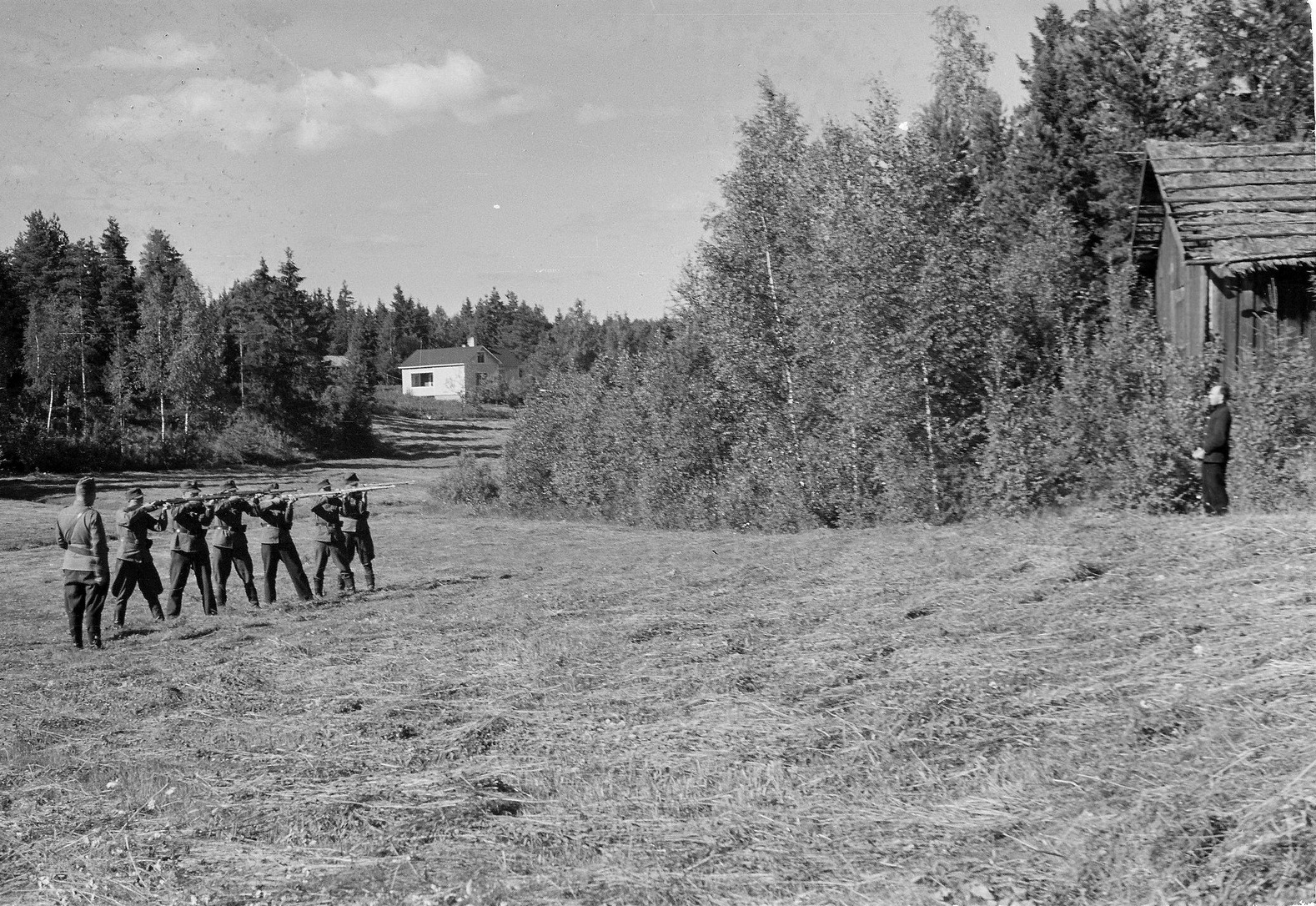
Execution of a Soviet infiltrator by a Finnish firing squad during the Continuation War, 1941–1944

The death penalty was widely used during and after the Finnish Civil War (January–May 1918); some 9,700 Finns and an unknown number of Russian volunteers on the Red side were executed during the war or in its aftermath. Most executions were carried out by firing squads after the sentences were given by illegal or semi-legal courts martial. Only some 250 persons were sentenced to death in courts acting on legal authority.

During World War II some 500 persons were executed, half of them condemned spies. The usual causes for death penalty for Finnish citizens were treason and high treason (and to a lesser extent cowardice and disobedience, applicable for military personnel). Almost all cases of capital punishment were tried by court-martial. Usually the executions were carried out by the regimental military police platoon, or by the local military police in the case of spies. One Finn, Toivo Koljonen, was executed for a civilian crime (six murders). Most executions occurred in 1941 and during the Soviet Summer Offensive in 1944. The last death sentences were given in 1945 for murder, but later commuted to life imprisonment.

The death penalty was abolished by Finnish law in 1949 for crimes committed during peacetime, and in 1972 for all crimes. Finland is party to the Optional protocol of the International Covenant on Civil and Political Rights, forbidding the use of the death penalty in all circumstances.

=== France ===
Execution of the Madrid rebels by a French firing squad on the Third of May 1808, as painted by Francisco Goya

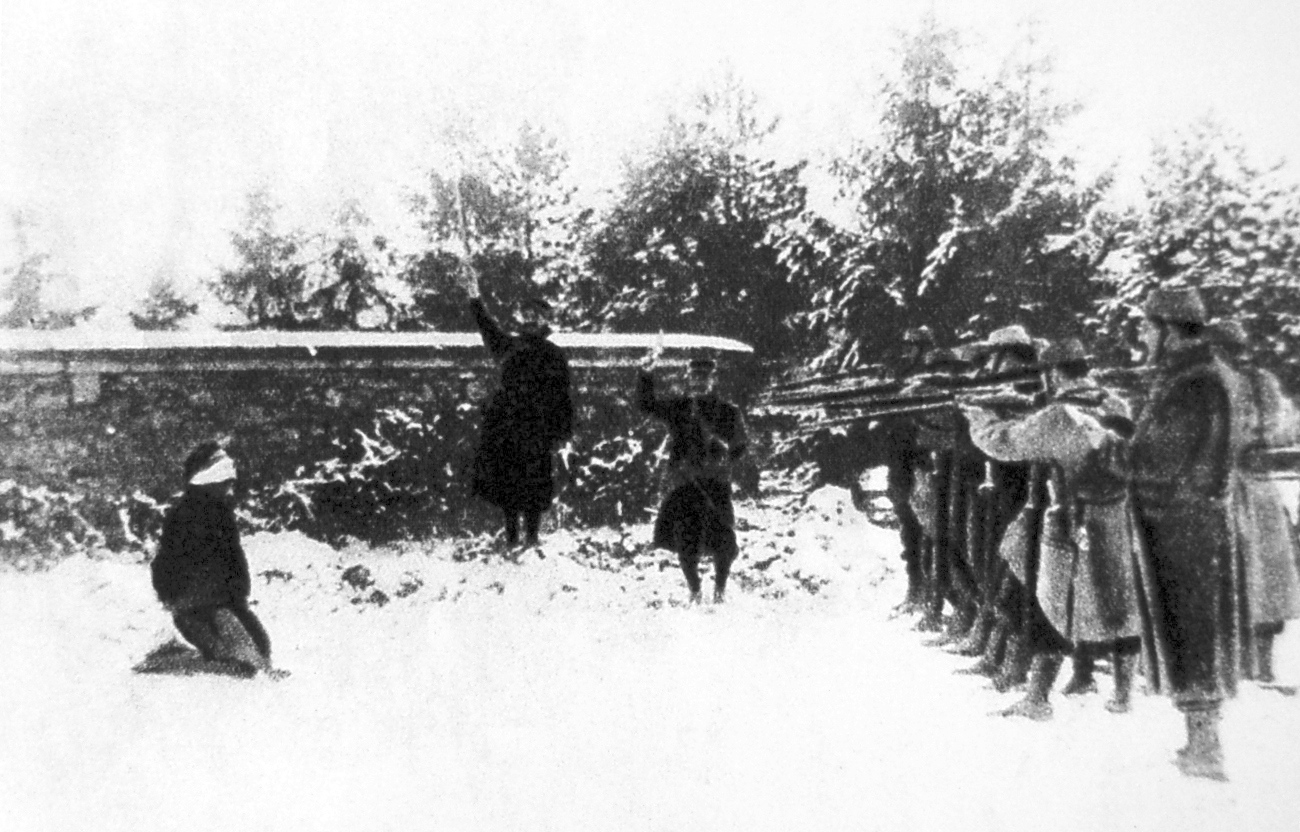
Execution at Verdun at the time of the French Army Mutinies of 1917

Pte. Thomas Highgate was the first British soldier to be convicted of desertion and executed by firing squad in September 1914 at Tournan-en-Brie during World War I. In October 1916 Pte. Harry Farr was shot for cowardice at Carnoy, which was later suspected to be acoustic shock. Highgate and Farr, along with 304 other British and Imperial troops who were executed for similar offenses, were listed at the Shot at Dawn Memorial which was erected to honor them.

On 15 October 1917 Dutch exotic dancer Mata Hari was executed by a French firing squad at Château de Vincennes castle in the town of Vincennes after being convicted of spying for Germany during World War I.

During World War II, on 24 September 1944, Josef Wende and Stephan Kortas, two Poles drafted into the German army, crossed the Moselle Rivers behind U.S. lines in civilian clothes to observe Allied strength and were to rejoin their own army on the same day. However, they were discovered by the Americans and arrested. On 18 October 1944 they were found guilty of espionage by a U.S. military commission and sentenced to death. On 11 November 1944 they were shot in the garden of a farmhouse at Toul. The footage of Wende's execution as well as Kortas's is shown in these links.

On 31 January 1945, U.S. Army Pvt. Edward "Eddie" Slovik was executed by firing squad for desertion near the village of Sainte-Marie-aux-Mines. He was the first American soldier executed for such an offense since the American Civil War.

On 15 October 1945 Pierre Laval, the puppet leader of Nazi-occupied Vichy France, was executed for treason at Fresnes Prison in Paris.

On 11 March 1963 Jean Bastien-Thiry was the last person to be executed by firing squad for a failed attempt to assassinate French president Charles de Gaulle.

=== Indonesia ===
Execution by firing squad is the capital punishment method used in Indonesia. The following persons were executed (reported by BBC World Service) by firing squad on 29 April 2015 following convictions for drug offences: two Australians, Myuran Sukumaran and Andrew Chan, the Ghanaian Martin Anderson, the Indonesian Zainal Abidin bin Mgs Mahmud Badarudin, three Nigerians: Raheem Agbaje Salami, Sylvester Obiekwe Nwolise and Okwudili Oyatanze, as well as Brazilian Rodrigo Gularte.

In 2006 Fabianus Tibo, Dominggus da Silva and Marinus Riwu were executed. Nigerian drug smugglers Samuel Iwachekwu Okoye and Hansen Anthoni Nwaolisa were executed in June 2008 in Nusakambangan Island. Five months later three men convicted for the 2002 Bali bombing—Amrozi, Imam Samudra and Ali Ghufron—were executed on the same spot in Nusakambangan. In January 2013 56-year-old British woman Lindsay Sandiford was sentenced to execution by firing squad for importing a large amount of cocaine; she lost her appeal against her sentence in April 2013. On 18 January 2015, under the new leadership of Joko Widodo, six people sentenced to death for producing and smuggling drugs into Indonesia were executed at Nusa Kambangan Penitentiary shortly after midnight.

=== Ireland ===
Following the 1916 Easter Rising in Ireland, 15 of the 16 leaders who were executed were shot by the Dublin Castle administration under martial law. The executions have often been cited as a reason for how the Rising managed to galvanise public support in Ireland after the failed rebellion.

Following the Anglo-Irish Treaty, a split in the government and the Dáil led to a Civil War during which the Free State Government sanctioned the executions by firing squad of 81 persons. Included in those numbers were some prominent prisoners who were executed without trial as reprisals. Records show that eleven soldiers would have had live rounds in their weapons, and one soldier had a blank round. The officers loaded the weapons for the soldiers so no soldier knew if his weapon contained the blank round or a live one. This method was used to prevent the soldiers from being prosecuted for war crimes in the future, as it was impossible to know which soldier had fired a blank round, and therefore all soldiers could claim innocence.

=== Italy ===
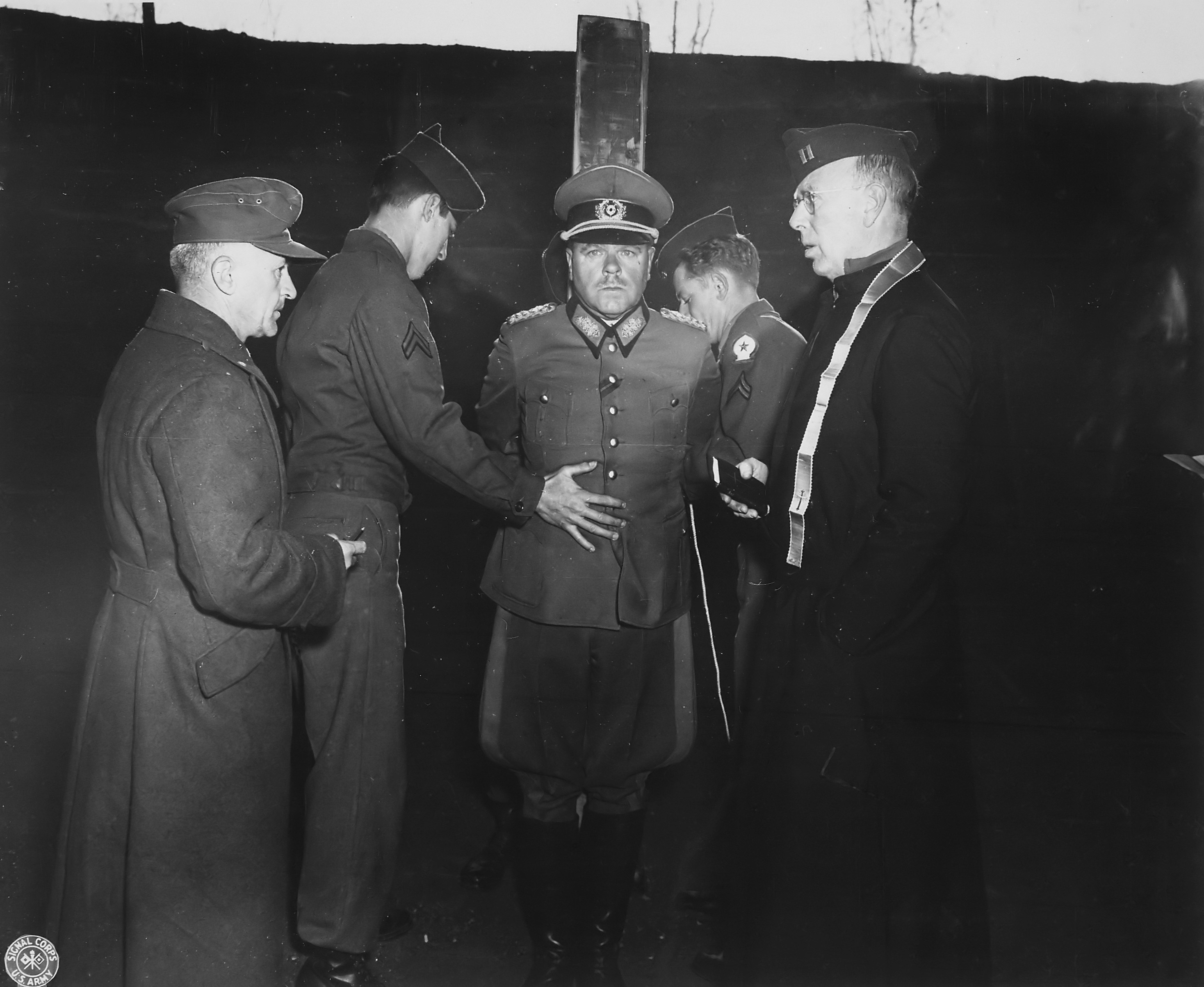
Anton Dostler before his execution

Italy had used the firing squad as its only form of death penalty, both for civilians and military, since the unification of the country in 1861. The death penalty was abolished completely by both Italian Houses of Parliament in 1889 but revived under the Italian dictatorship of Benito Mussolini in 1926. Mussolini was himself shot in the last days of World War II.

On 1 December 1945 Anton Dostler, the first German general to be tried for war crimes, was executed by a U.S. firing squad in Aversa after being found guilty by a U.S. military tribunal of ordering the killing of 15 U.S. prisoners of war in Italy during World War II.

The last execution took place on 4 March 1947, as Francesco La Barbera, Giovanni Puleo and Giovanni D'Ignoti, sentenced to death on multiple accounts of robbery and murder, faced the firing squad at the range of Basse di Stura, near Turin. Soon after the Constitution of the newly proclaimed Republic prohibited the death penalty except for some crimes of the military penal code of war, like high treason; no one was sentenced to death after 1947. In 2007 the Constitution was amended to ban the death penalty altogether.

=== Malta ===
Firing squads were used during the periods of French and British control in Malta. Ringleaders of rebellions were often shot dead by firing squad during the French period, with perhaps the most notable examples being Dun Mikiel Xerri and other patriots in 1799.

The British also used the practice briefly, and for the last time in 1813, when two men were shot separately outside the courthouse after being convicted of failing to report their infection of plague to the authorities.

=== Mexico ===
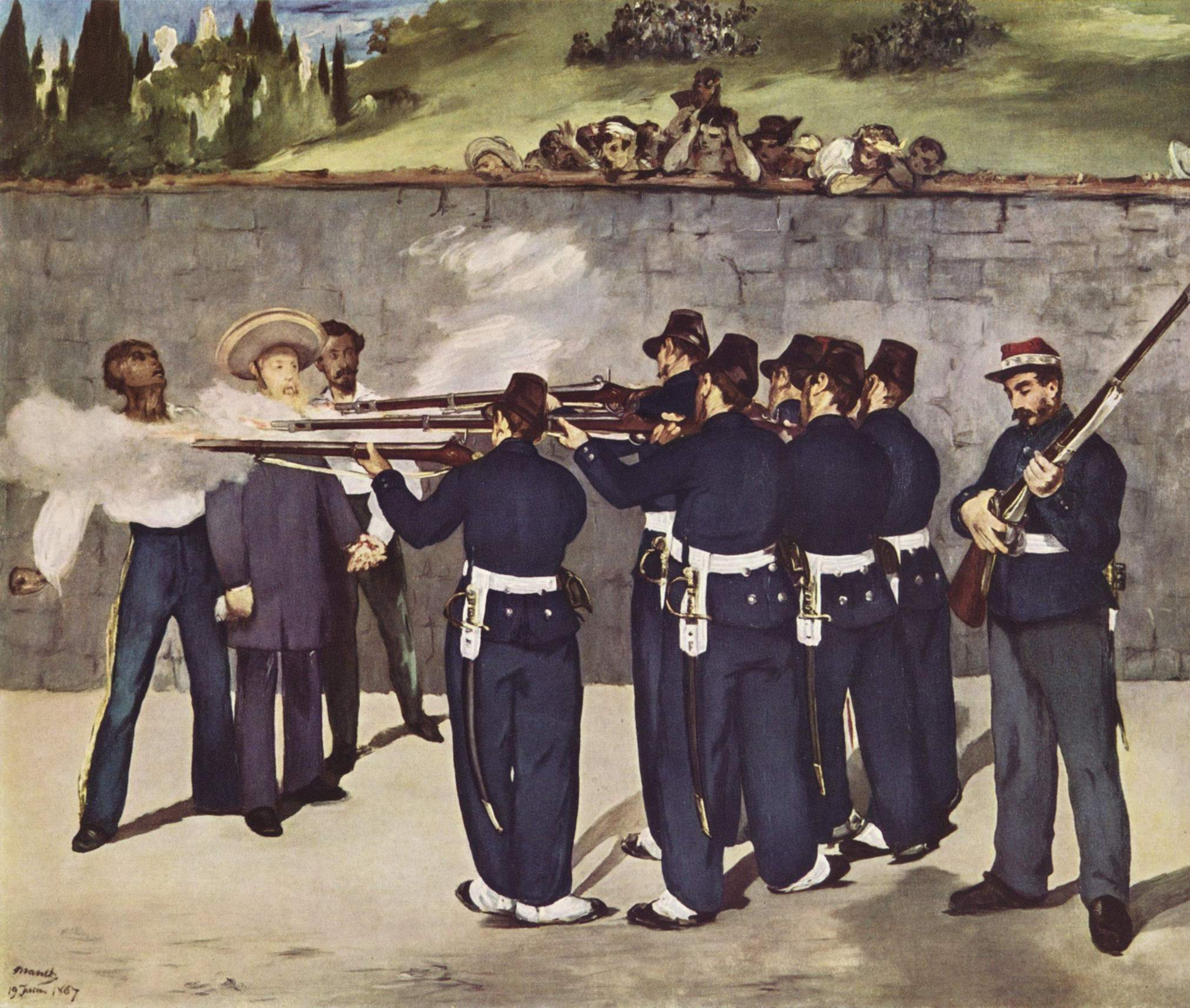
Execution of Emperor Maximilian of Mexico, by Édouard Manet, 1868

During the Mexican Independence War, several Independentist generals (such as Miguel Hidalgo and José María Morelos) were executed by Spanish firing squads. Also, Emperor Maximilian I of Mexico and two of his generals were executed in the Cerro de las Campanas after the Juaristas took control of Mexico in 1867. Manet immortalized the execution in a now-famous painting, The Execution of Emperor Maximilian; he painted at least three versions.

Firing-squad execution was the most common way to carry out a death sentence in Mexico, especially during the Mexican Revolution and the Cristero War. An example of that is in the attempted execution of Wenseslao Moguel, who survived being shot ten times—once at point-blank range—because he fought under Pancho Villa. After these events, the death sentence was imposed for fewer types of crimes in Article 22 of the Mexican Constitution; however, in 2005 capital punishment was constitutionally prohibited, and there has not been a judicial execution since 1961.

=== Netherlands ===
During the Nazi occupation in World War II some 3,000 persons were executed by German firing squads. The victims were sometimes sentenced by a military court; in other cases they were hostages or arbitrary pedestrians who were executed publicly to intimidate the population. After the attack on high-ranking German officer Hanns Albin Rauter, about 300 people were executed publicly as reprisal against resistance movements. Rauter himself was executed near Scheveningen on 12 January 1949, following his conviction for war crimes. Anton Mussert, a Dutch Nazi leader, was sentenced to death by firing squad and executed in the dunes near The Hague on 7 May 1946.

While under Allied guard in Amsterdam, and five days after the capitulation of Nazi Germany, two German Navy deserters were shot by a firing squad composed of other German prisoners kept in the Canadian-run prisoner-of-war camp. The men were lined up against the wall of an air raid shelter near an abandoned Ford Motor Company assembly plant in the presence of Canadian military.

=== Nigeria ===
Nigeria executes criminals who committed armed robberies—such as Ishola Oyenusi, Lawrence Anini and Osisikankwu—as well as military officers convicted of plotting coups against the government, such as Buka Suka Dimka and Maj. Gideon Orkar, by firing squad.

=== Norway ===
Vidkun Quisling, the leader of the collaborationist Nasjonal Samling Party and president of Norway during the German occupation in World War II, was sentenced to death for treason and executed by firing squad on 24 October 1945 at the Akershus Fortress.

=== Papua New Guinea ===
During the Australian occupation of German New Guinea, the military administration used firing squads to carry out several summary executions of New Guineans on the instructions of administrator Samuel Pethebridge, who authorised Australian officers to arrest, try and execute those they deemed guilty of murder.

Following the end of World War II, firing squads were used by the Australian military in New Guinea to execute Japanese military personnel and collaborators convicted under the War Crimes Act 1945.

In 2013, Papua New Guinea amended its criminal code to reintroduce capital punishment. The National Executive Council approved death by firing squad as one of three methods available for use, alongside hanging and lethal injection. However no executions were carried out prior to the re-abolition of capital punishment in 2022.

=== Paraguay ===
The last judicial execution in Paraguay took place on 1 December 1917, when Gastón Gadín Lacour and Cipriano León were executed by firing squad in Asunción for murder. Gadín was 18 years old at the time. Although the death penalty remained legally available in Paraguay, no further executions were carried out. It was abolished by the 1992 Constitution.

=== Peru ===
The last person to be executed by Peru to date, Air Force NCO Julio Vargas Garayar, was sentenced to death in December 1978 for allegedly selling information to Chilean intelligence, and executed by firing squad on 20 January 1979.

=== Philippines ===
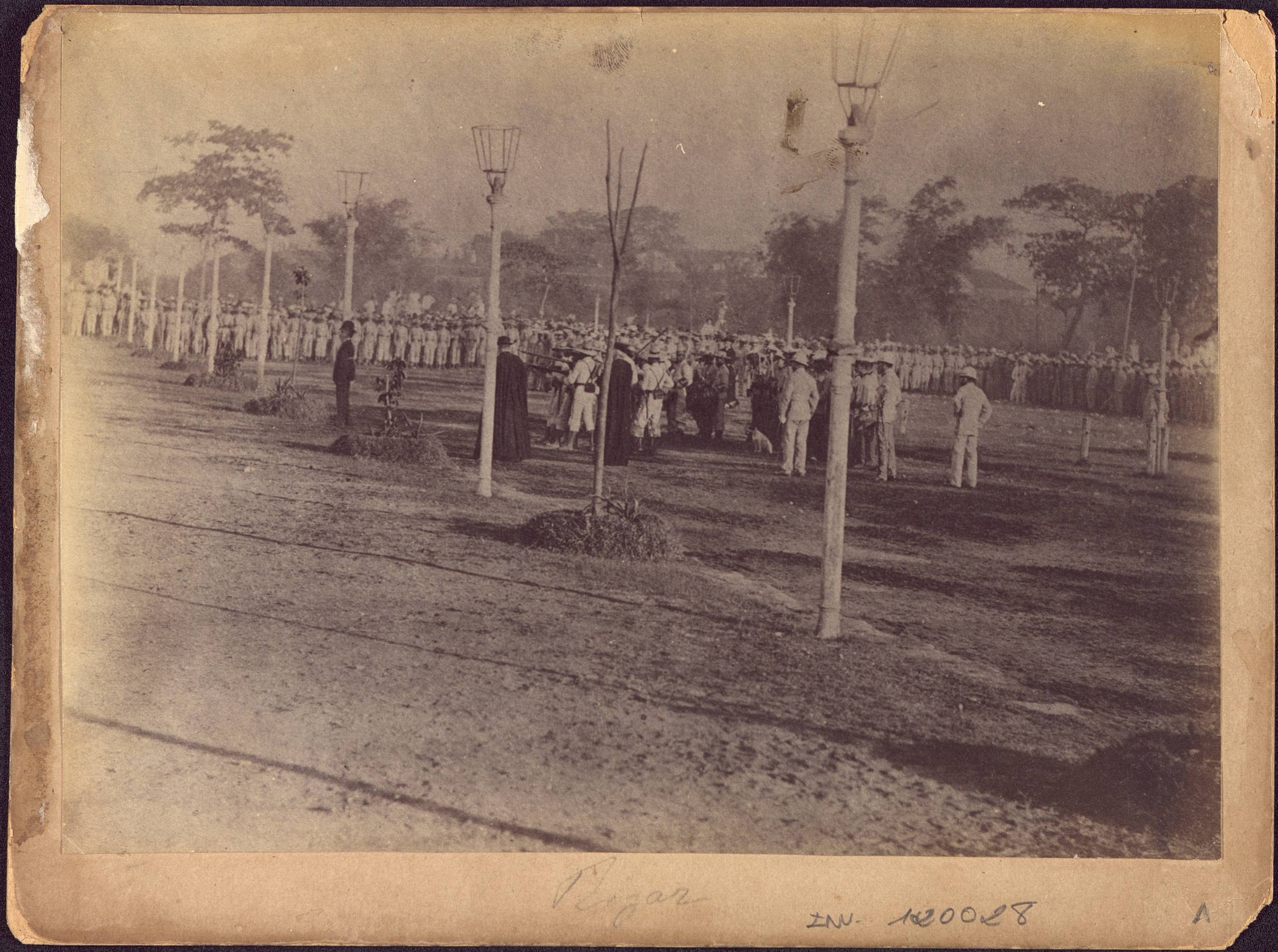
Photograph of the execution of José Rizal

José Rizal was executed by firing squad on the morning of 30 December 1896, in what is now Rizal Park, where his remains have since been placed.

Prior to Rizal, the Thirteen Martyrs of Cavite were executed by firing squad on 12 September 1896 outside Fort San Felipe in Cavite City. The de facto provincial capital of Cavite is named Trece Mártires in their honour.

Under the dictatorship of President Ferdinand Marcos, Sr., drug trafficking was punishable with death by firing squad, with the execution of Lim Seng noted for having been broadcast live on national television. Execution by firing squad was later replaced by the electric chair, then lethal injection. On 24 June 2006, President Gloria Macapagal Arroyo abolished capital punishment through the enactment of Republic Act No. 9346. Existing death row inmates, who numbered in the thousands, were eventually given life sentences or reclusión perpetua instead.

=== Romania ===
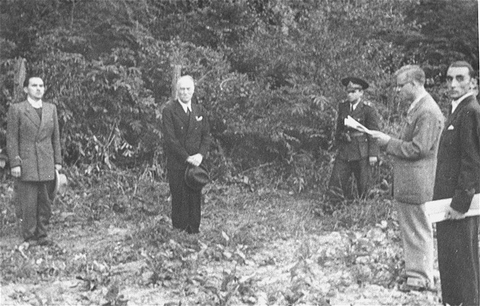
Mihai Antonescu and Ion Antonescu right before their execution

Marshal Ion Antonescu who presided over two successive wartime dictatorships during most of World War II, his Deputy Prime Minister and Foreign Minister Mihai Antonescu, governor of Transnistria between 1941 and 1944, Gheorghe Alexianu, and head of the Romanian Gendarmerie, Constantin Z. Vasiliu were executed by a military firing squad on 1 June 1946. Antonescu raised his hat in salute once the firing order was given.

Nicolae Ceaușescu was executed by firing squad alongside his wife Elena Ceausescu while singing the Communist Internationale following a show trial, bringing an end to the Romanian Revolution, on Christmas Day, 1989. This was also the last execution by firing squad in Romania.

=== Russia/USSR ===
In Imperial Russia, firing squads were used in the army for executions during combat on the orders of military tribunals.

In the Soviet Union, from the very earliest days, the bullet to the back of the head, in front of a ready-dug burial trench was by far the most common practice. It became especially widely used during the Great Purge.

=== Saudi Arabia ===
Executions in Saudi Arabia are usually carried out by beheading; however, at times other methods have been used. Al-Beshi, a Saudi executioner, has said that he has conducted some executions by shooting. Mishaal bint Fahd Al Saud, a Saudi princess, was also executed in the same way.

=== South Africa ===
Two soldiers of the Bushveldt Carbineers, Breaker Morant and Peter Handcock, were executed by a British firing squad in the South African Republic on 27 February 1902 for war crimes they committed during the Second Boer War.

=== Spain ===
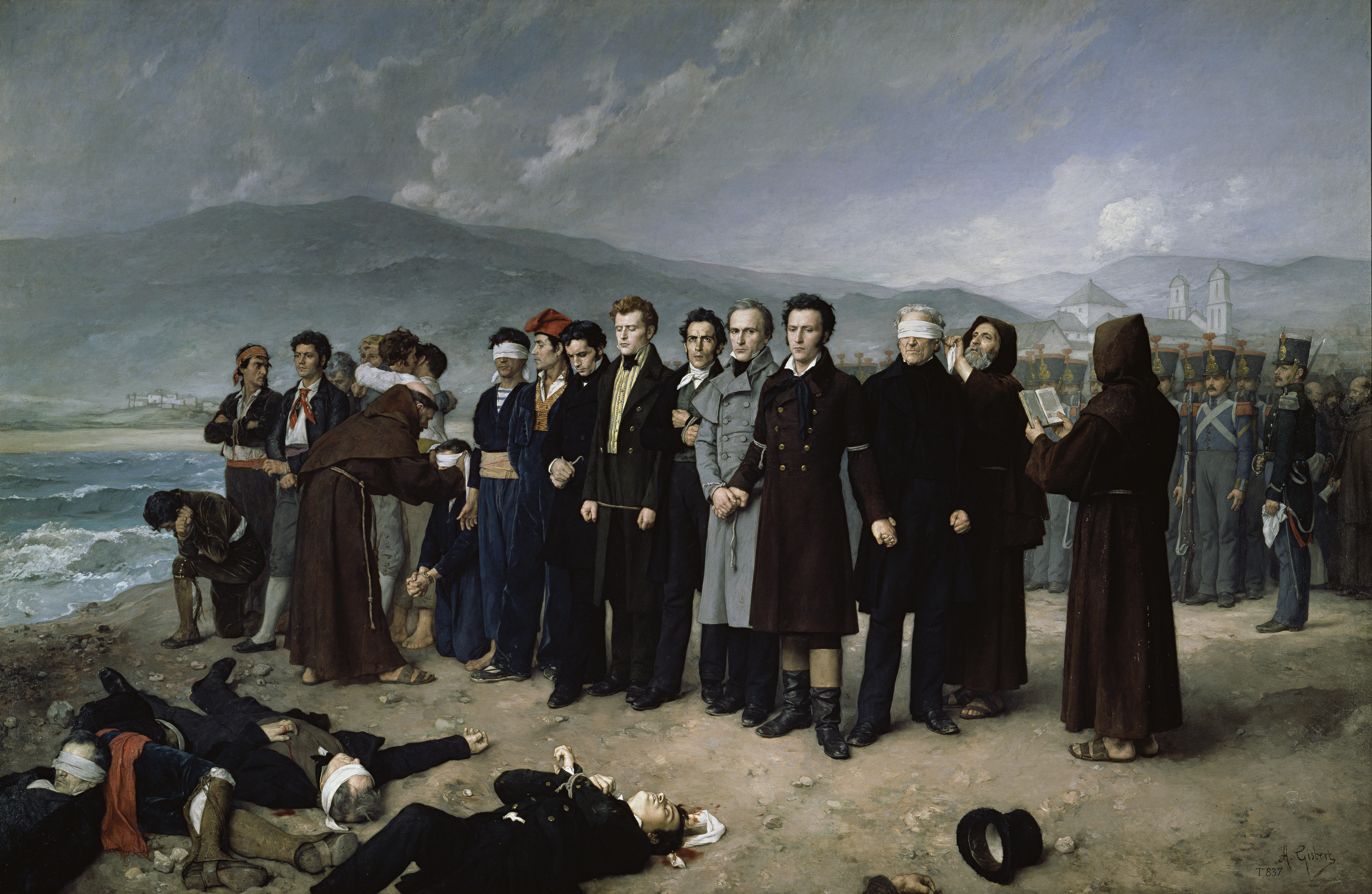
Execution of Torrijos and his Companions on the Beach at Málaga by Antonio Gisbert Pérez, in 1888 (Museo del Prado)

Since the Spanish transition to democracy in 1977 the new Spanish constitution prohibits the death penalty. Previously, execution by firing squad was reserved for cases under military jurisdiction. As in the rest of Europe, the death penalty ordered by a civil court was carried out by other methods clearly different from execution. In modern times, mainly by hanging or garrote.

During the decolonization of the Americas, several heroes of the independence of the former viceroyalties were executed by firing squad, including Camilo Torres Tenorio, Antonio Baraya, Antonio Villavicencio, José María Carbonell, Francisco José de Caldas, Jorge Tadeo Lozano, Policarpa Salavarrieta, María Antonia Santos Plata, José María Morelos, Mariano Matamoros, etc.

At the time of the Spanish Civil War the phrase "¡Al paredón!" ("To the wall!") to express the death threat to whom certain blame is attributed to be summarily executed. "Dar un paseo" (Going for a walk) is the euphemism of a series of violent episodes and political repression that occurred during the Spanish Civil War, which took place on both the Republican and the Nationalist factions, looking for victims with the excuse of taking them for a walk, which ended with the shooting in the open fields, often at night. It was an abbreviated murder procedure in the form of the Ley de fugas (Law for escapes). Sometimes common criminals participated in them.

Indalecio Prieto would define these executions in Letters to a sculptor: small details of great events as:

"Executions without summary that were carried out in both areas of Spain and that dishonored us Spaniards on both sides equally".

The last use of capital punishment in Spain took place on 27 September 1975 by firing squads for two members of the armed Basque nationalist and separatist group ETA political-military and three members of the Revolutionary Antifascist Patriotic Front (FRAP).

=== United Arab Emirates ===
In the United Arab Emirates, firing squad is the preferred method of execution.

=== United Kingdom and British Dominions ===
The standard method of execution in the United Kingdom was hanging. Execution by firing squad was limited to times of war, armed insurrection and in the military, although it is now outlawed in all circumstances, along with all other forms of capital punishment.

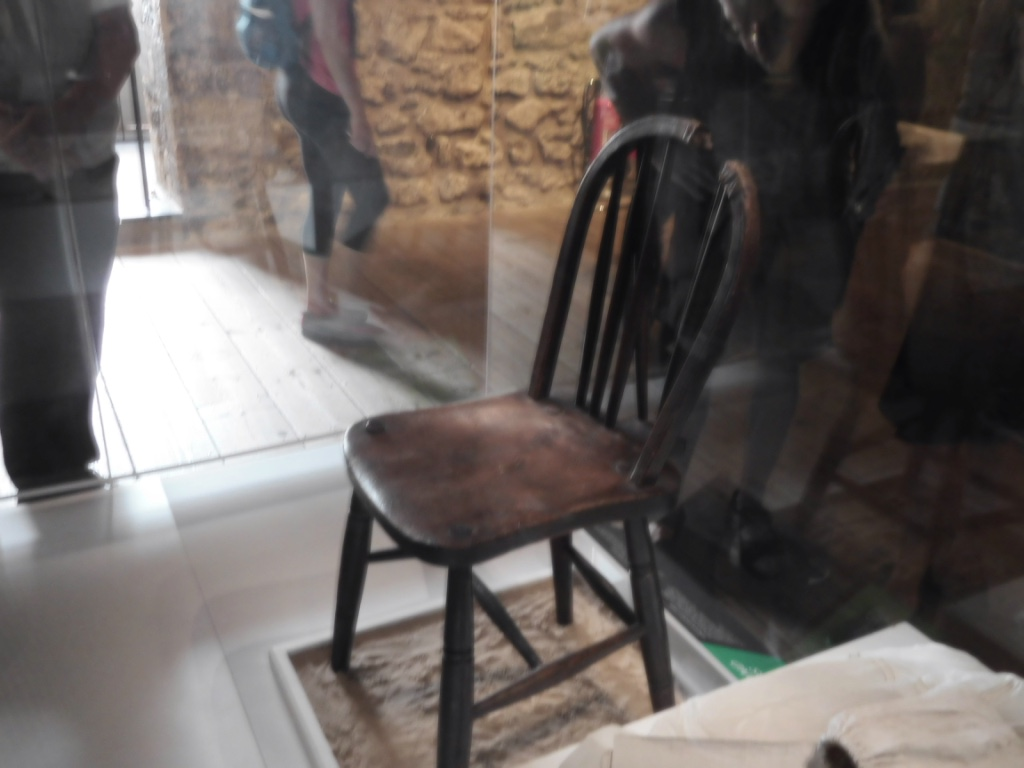
Chair in which Josef Jakobs sat when he was executed by firing squad 15 August 1941

The Tower of London was used during both World Wars for executions. During World War I, eleven captured German spies were shot between 1914 and 1916: nine on the Tower's rifle range and two in the Tower Ditch, all of whom were buried in East London Cemetery, in Plaistow, London. On 15 August 1941, the last execution at the Tower was that of German Cpl. Josef Jakobs, shot for espionage during World War II.

Since the 1960s, there has been some controversy concerning the 346 British and Imperial troops—including 25 Canadians, 22 Irish and 5 New Zealanders—shot for desertion, murder, cowardice and other offences during World War I, some of whom are now thought to have been suffering from combat stress reaction or post-traumatic stress disorder ("shell-shock", as it was then known). This led to organisations such as the Shot at Dawn Campaign being set up in later years to try to uncover just why these soldiers were executed. The Shot at Dawn Memorial was erected at Staffordshire to honour these soldiers. In August 2006 it was announced that 306 of these soldiers would receive posthumous pardons.

=== United States ===
Firing squad usage in the United States: State uses this as a secondary method State once used this method, but does not anymore State has never used this method

During the American War of Independence, General Washington was said to have "approved hundreds of death sentences by either hanging or firing squad". Mutiny could be dealt with harshly, as in the Pompton Mutiny of January 1781: three soldiers (one being reprieved at the last minute) were selected to be shot from among a large group of mutineers. The firing squad was ordered to be composed of their fellow mutineers. On occasion however, pardons were also granted.

During the American Civil War, hundreds of soldiers were executed by firing squad by the Union Army and the Confederate Army.

The United States Army carried out 10 executions of its own soldiers by firing squad during World War II from 1942 to 1945, including Eddie Slovik, the only US soldier to be executed for desertion. However, this does not include individuals executed by the US Army by firing squad after being convicted by US military courts for violations of the laws of war, including about 18 German soldiers who were shot after being caught in American uniform as part of Operation Greif during the Battle of the Bulge, persons shot after being caught engaging in acts of espionage against US forces, or soldiers convicted by US military courts of having committed crimes against American military personnel.

The United States Army took over Shepton Mallet Prison in Somerset, U.K., in 1942, renaming it Disciplinary Training Center No.1 and housing troops convicted of offences across Europe. There were 18 executions at the prison, two of them by firing squad for murder: U.S. Army Pvt. Alexander Miranda on 30 May 1944 and Pvt. Benjamin Pygate on 28 November 1944.

In 1913, Andriza Mircovich became the first and only inmate in Nevada to be executed by shooting. After the warden of Nevada State Prison could not find five men to form a firing squad, a shooting machine was built to carry out Mircovich's execution.

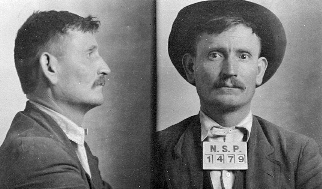
Andriza Mircovich was the first and only inmate in Nevada to be executed by shooting.

John W. Deering allowed an electrocardiogram recording of the effect of gunshot wounds on his heart during his 1938 execution by firing squad, and afterwards his body was donated to the University of Utah School of Medicine, at his request.

==== 1960 ====
Since 1960 there have been seven executions by firing squad, four in Utah and three in South Carolina: The 1960 execution of James W. Rodgers, Gary Gilmore's execution in 1977, John Albert Taylor in 1996, who chose a firing squad for his execution, according to The New York Times, "to make a statement that Utah was sanctioning murder". However, a 2010 article for the British newspaper The Times quotes Taylor justifying his choice because he did not want to "flop around like a dying fish" during a lethal injection. Ronnie Lee Gardner was executed by firing squad in 2010, having said he preferred this method of execution because of his "Mormon heritage". Gardner also felt that lawmakers were trying to eliminate the firing squad, in opposition to popular opinion in Utah, because of concern over the state's image in the 2002 Winter Olympics. Brad Sigmon was executed in South Carolina on March 7, 2025 after also opting for a firing squad. On April 11, 2025, Mikal Mahdi became the second inmate to be executed by firing squad in South Carolina.

==== 2004 ====
Execution by firing squad was banned in Utah in 2004, but as the ban was not retroactive, three inmates (Troy Kell, Ralph Menzies and Taberon Honie) on Utah's death row had the firing squad set as their method of execution. Honie was eventually executed by lethal injection in 2024. Idaho banned execution by firing squad in 2009, temporarily leaving Oklahoma as the only state utilizing this method of execution (and only as a secondary method).

==== 2015 ====
Reluctance by drug companies to see their drugs used to kill people has led to a shortage of the commonly used lethal injection drugs. In March 2015, Utah enacted legislation allowing for execution by firing squad if the drugs they use are unavailable. Several other states are also exploring a return to the firing squad. Thus, after waning in both use and popularity in recent decades, as of 2022, firing squad executions appear to be at least anecdotally regaining popularity as an alternative to lethal injection.

==== 2019 ====
On January 30, 2019, South Carolina's Senate voted 26–13 in favor of a revived proposal to bring back the electric chair and add firing squads to its execution options. On May 14, 2021, South Carolina Governor Henry McMaster signed a bill into law which brought back the electric chair as the default method of execution (in the event lethal injection was unavailable) and added the firing squad to the list of execution options. South Carolina had not performed executions in over a decade, and its lethal injection drugs expired in 2013. Pharmaceutical companies have since refused to sell drugs for lethal injection.

==== 2022 ====
On April 7, 2022, the South Carolina Supreme Court scheduled the execution of Richard Bernard Moore for April 29, 2022. On April 15, 2022, Moore chose to be executed by firing squad instead of the electric chair, however, his execution was later stayed by the South Carolina Supreme Court, and was executed on November 1, 2024 by lethal injection.

==== 2023 ====
On March 20, 2023, a firing squad bill passed the Idaho state legislature, and was signed by the governor.

In 2023, the Tennessee legislature debated using the firing squad as a means of execution.

==== 2025 ====
On February 7, 2025, the South Carolina Supreme Court scheduled the execution of Brad Sigmon for March 7, 2025. He was given the choice to die by lethal injection, firing squad, or electrocution, the third of which his lawyers stated he did not want to die from. Due to concerns about the lethal injection doses, on February 21, 2025, Sigmon chose to die by firing squad. On March 7, 2025, at just after 6 PM EST, Sigmon was executed and pronounced dead a few minutes later.

Three weeks after Sigmon was executed, Mikal Mahdi, another prisoner from South Carolina's death row, also elected to be put to death by firing squad after receiving an execution date of April 11, 2025. He was executed as scheduled, becoming the fifth person in the United States and the second in South Carolina to be executed by this method.

Seven months after Mahdi was executed, convicted spree killer Stephen Corey Bryant, who had elected to be put to death by firing squad, was executed on November 14, 2025, thus becoming the third inmate in South Carolina to be executed by firing squad.

On March 12, 2025, Idaho governor Brad Little signed a bill to designate firing squad as the primary execution method in the state. Idaho became the first state with such a policy.

Ralph Leroy Menzies, Utah's longest-serving death row inmate, was scheduled to be executed by firing squad on September 5, 2025, after the state courts found he was mentally competent to be executed despite his symptoms of dementia. On 29 August 2025, the Utah Supreme Court vacated Menzies' death warrant and ordered a new mental competency hearing. However, Menzies died of undisclosed natural causes in a local hospital on November 26, 2025, before it could take place.

As of 2025, Idaho, Mississippi, Oklahoma, South Carolina, and Utah are the only states that use firing squad for the death penalty.

==== 2026 ====
Nidal Hasan is scheduled to be executed by firing squad on 3 December 2026. According to the Pentagon, this was to be live-streamed, which would have marked the first public execution in the United States in over 90 years. The decision to live-stream the execution was then overturned by President Donald J. Trump, with Trump stating 'many very good and well meaning people would rather not watch him die'.

== See also ==
- Bullet fee
- Use of capital punishment by country
