= Wenceslao Moguel =

Mexican execution survivor (1896–1976)

- Moguel in 1937
- Born: Wenceslao Moguel Herrera; November 1, 1890; Mérida, Yucatán, Mexico
- Died: July 29, 1976 (aged 85); Mérida, Yucatán, Mexico
- Other name: El Fusilado
- Occupation: Handyman

Wenceslao Moguel Herrera (1 November 1890 – 29 July 1976), known in the press as El Fusilado (Spanish: "The Executed One"), was a Mexican soldier under Pancho Villa who was captured on 18 March 1915 during the Mexican Revolution, and survived execution by firing squad.

He was sentenced to death without a trial, and was shot 8–9 times in the body. He received the coup de grâce, or one final shot to the head at point-blank range to ensure death, yet managed to survive, though he was permanently scarred and disfigured by the event.

Stories differ as to how he survived. Some sources suggest that he was rescued: "The next day Moguel was found unconscious among the dead bodies of his comrades. He was given medical attention and recovered." Others state that he escaped on his own and received care afterwards: "[Moguel] crawled away to the church of St. James Apostle three blocks away where a church member found him and took him home until he recuperated."

Moguel appeared on the Ripley's Believe It or Not! radio show on July 16, 1937. He is the focus of a song, titled "El Fusilado", by British anarchist band Chumbawamba. It appears on their thirteenth studio album The Boy Bands Have Won. This song was covered by The Longest Johns in 2023.

== Bibliography ==
- Wenceslao Moguel. El milagro del Santo de Halachó, o Historia de un Fusilado. – Merida, 1967. – 186 pp.
