= Bruce C. Lubeck =

American judge

Judge Bruce C. Lubeck (born 1945) is a district court judge in the U.S. state of Utah.

== Early life ==
Lubeck was born in 1945. He grew up in Salt Lake City and has lived in the state of Utah his entire life. He attended Highland High School in Salt Lake City where he was an all-around athlete. He played basketball, football, and ran track. After he graduated high school, he attended the University of Utah where he majored in psychology. He earned his J.D. degree in 1971 from the University Of Utah College Of Law.

== Legal career ==
Judge Lubeck was sworn into the bar in 1971. He started as a Legal Defender with the Salt Lake Legal Defender Association and then worked in his own private law firm as a solo practitioner. In 1981, he was appointed as an Assistant United States Attorney in the Utah District. He served law in this position for 20 years heading the Narcotics Section and leading the office's organized Crime Drug Enforcement Task Force. While he was keeping busy with his legal duties, he was still able to teach law courses at Westminster College, the University of Utah, and Salt Lake Community College. In 2001, he was then appointed to the Utah trial bench. Before joining the bench, Lubeck served on several Utah State Bar committees, including the Lawyers Helping Lawyers Committee and the Utah Supreme Court Criminal Rules Advisory Committee. He also served as serial killer Ted Bundy's legal counsel during the DaRonch trial.

== Judicial career ==
Judge Lubeck was appointed by former Utah Governor Michael O. Leavitt as a Utah Third Judicial District judge in May 2001. He currently serves the Salt Lake, Tooele, and Summit counties. The Litigation section of the Utah State Bar has created a "Bench Book" about Judge Lubeck, which sets forth his court practices and views. Judge Lubeck was successfully retained in office when he stood for retention election in 2010. Judge Lubeck was certified as qualified for retention after being evaluated by the Utah Judicial Council. Judge Lubeck's performance evaluation found in the 2010 Utah Voters Information Pamphlet. Judge Lubeck has had around 40-50 cases where a party has appealed his rulings. About 90% of the time his cases are affirmed in civil cases.

== Selected cases or rulings ==
=== Haynes Land and Livestock vs. Jacob Family Chalk Creek and Others ===
Judge Lubeck was involved in a significant land use dispute over a roadway in Summit County, Utah in the case of Haynes Land & Livestock v. Jacob Family Chalk Creek, et al., 2010 Ut. App 112 (2010), which case was appealed to the Utah Court of Appeals and established significant Utah law.

=== Gender identification ===
In 2017 Lubeck refused an application from Lex Rigby, a transgender man, to have his gender identification changed on legal documents.
