= Osisikankwu =

Nigerian murderer

Obioma Nwankwo // predominantly known as Osiskankwu was a Nigerian kidnapper and murderer. He terrorised Abia state from 2008 until he was killed by the Joint Military Task Force of the Nigerian army on 12 December 2010.
