= Kraftwerk discography =

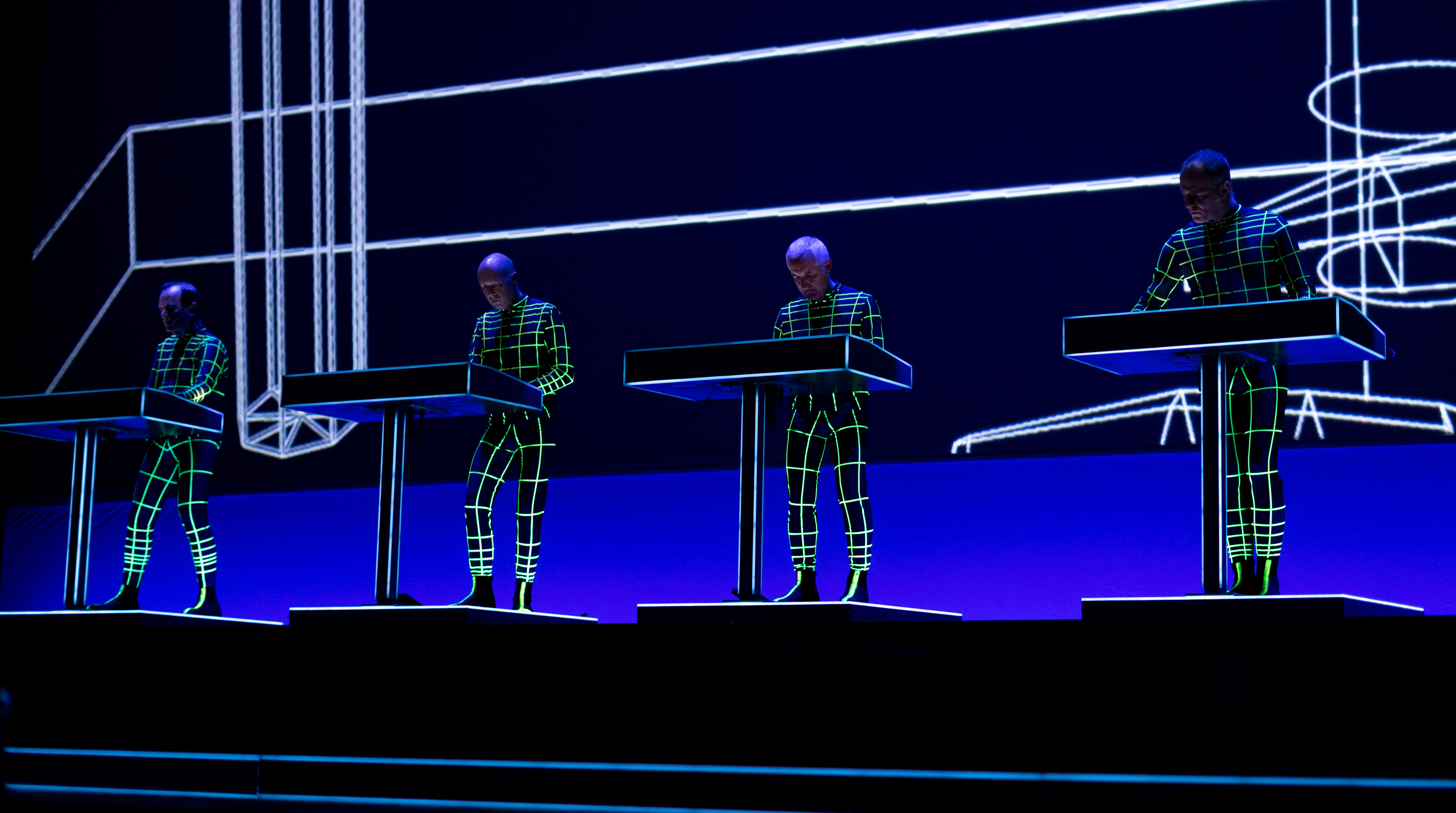
- Kraftwerk performing at the Royal Albert Hall 2017. From left to right: Ralf Hütter, Henning Schmitz, Fritz Hilpert and Falk Grieffenhagen
- Studio albums: 10
- Live albums: 2
- Compilation albums: 4
- Singles: 28
- Video albums: 3
- Music videos: 18
- Box sets: 2

The discography of German electronic band Kraftwerk consists of 10 studio albums, two live albums, four compilation albums, one remix album and 28 singles. Formed by Ralf Hütter and Florian Schneider in Düsseldorf in 1970, Kraftwerk were part of the krautrock scene. However, the group mostly found fame as pioneers of electronic music, showcasing their styles on a series of concept albums.

While their initial albums featured mostly German lyrics, in 1975 Kraftwerk began writing lyrics that combined both German and English verses. Beginning with "Trans-Europe Express" (1977), most songs by the group were created as duplicate versions sung in English or German; some French, Japanese, Italian or Spanish versions were made.

Since the mid-1970s Kraftwerk have always picked at least two album tracks for release as singles. These accompanying singles were, for many years, created by simply editing down the album recordings, rather than being remixed or otherwise expanded. Since 1991 Kraftwerk have tended to follow the trend for releasing singles in multiple remixed arrangements. A small number of recordings have only been issued as albumless singles, notably those between 1999 and 2000 for the Expo 2000 project.

Prior to forming Kraftwerk, Hütter and Schneider were part of a project called Organisation that released the album Tone Float in 1969.

== Studio albums ==
Title	Album details	Chart positions											Certifications (sales thresholds)
Title	Album details	GER	AUS	AUT	CAN	FRA	ITA	NL	NZ	SWE	UK	US	Certifications (sales thresholds)
Kraftwerk	Released: November 1970; Label: Philips, Vertigo; Format: LP, CS	30	—	—	—	—	—	—	—	—	—	—	
Kraftwerk 2	Released: January 1972; Label: Philips, Vertigo; Format: LP, CS	36	—	—	—	—	—	—	—	—	—	—	
Ralf & Florian	Released: November 1973; Label: Philips, Vertigo; Format: LP, CS, 8-trk	—	—	—	—	—	—	—	—	—	—	160	
Autobahn	Released: 1 November 1974; Label: Philips, Vertigo; Format: LP, CS, 8-trk	7	9	35	5	—	—	11	7	27	4	5	BPI: Silver; SNEP: Gold
Radio-Aktivität / Radio Activity	Released: November 1975; Label: Kling Klang, EMI Electrola, Capitol; Format: LP, CS, 8-trk	22	94	4	59	1	—	—	—	—	—	140	BPI: Silver; SNEP: Gold
Trans Europa Express / Trans-Europe Express	Released: March 1977; Label: Kling Klang, EMI Electrola, Capitol; Format: LP, CS, 8-trk	32	—	—	—	2	8	—	—	32	49	119	BPI: Silver
Die Mensch-Maschine / The Man-Machine	Released: 28 April 1978; Label: Kling Klang, EMI Electrola, Capitol; Format: LP, CS, 8-trk	12	56	15	—	14	15	29	—	24	9	130	BPI: Gold
Computerwelt / Computer World	Released: 11 May 1981; Label: Kling Klang, EMI, Warner Bros.; Format: LP, CS	7	51	14	—	—	—	—	28	27	15	72	BPI: Silver
Electric Café / Techno Pop	Released: 27 October 1986; Label: Kling Klang, EMI, Warner Bros.; Format: CD, LP, CS	23	—	—	—	—	—	56	—	9	58	158	
The Mix	German version: The Mix; Released: 10 June 1991; Label: Kling Klang/EMI Elektra (US); Notes: Album of remixed back-catalogue	7	132	12	—	—	—	—	—	20	15	—	BPI: Silver
Tour de France Soundtracks	Released: 4 August 2003; Label: Kling Klang, EMI, Astralwerks; Format: CD, LP	1	110	29	—	84	—	76	—	7	21	—	BPI: Silver

== Live albums ==
Title	Album details	Chart positions						
Title	Album details	GER	AUT	FRA	ITA	NL	SWE	UK
Minimum-Maximum	Released: 6 June 2005; Label: Kling Klang/Astralwerks/Caroline/Virgin/EMI; Notes: 2 CDs/4 LPs, 2 DVDs, also available as a special edition Notebook with an 88-page book	26	33	123	44	93	29	29
3-D The Catalogue	Released: 26 May 2017; Label: Kling Klang/Parlophone/WEA	4	26	171	75	—	—	24

== Compilation albums ==
Title	Album details	Chart positions	
Title	Album details	GER	AUT
Doppelalbum	Released: 1974; Label: Philips; Notes: France/Germany release	—	—
Exceller 8	Released: 1975; Label: Vertigo (UK), Mercury (Canada); Notes: UK/Canada release	—	—
Elektro Kinetik	Released: 1981; Label: Vertigo; Notes: UK release	—	—
Remixes	Released: 21 December 2020 (digital); 25 March 2022 (CD and vinyl); Label: Kling Klang/Parlophone/WEA; Notes: Compilation of remixes from 1991–2022	4	37

== Box sets ==
Title	Album details	Chart positions
Title	Album details	GER
Klang Box	Recorded: 1976–1986; Released: May 1997; Label: Kling Klang/EMI; Notes: Black XL-size T-shirt with a robot motif and the name Kraftwerk (identical to the design on the front lid of the box)	—
The Catalogue	German version: Der Katalog; Released: 2 October 2009; Label: Kling Klang/EMI (Germany) Mute/EMI (Europe) Astralwerks/Caroline/Virgin/EMI (US); Notes: Promotionally issued in 2004, remastered boxed set of albums from 1974 to 2003	34

== Singles ==
Title	Year	Chart positions										Certifications	Album
Title	Year	GER	AUS	AUT	BEL	CAN	IRL	NL	NZ	UK	US	Certifications	Album
"Autobahn"	1975	9	30	—	—	12	20	16	4	11	25		Autobahn
"Kometenmelodie 2"	1975	—	—	—	—	—	—	—	—	—	—		Autobahn
"Radioactivity"	1976	—	—	—	6	—	—	—	—	—	—	SNEP: Gold	Radio-Activity
"Trans-Europe Express"	1977	—	—	—	26	96	—	—	—	—	67		Trans-Europe Express
"Showroom Dummies"	1977	—	—	—	—	—	28	—	—	25	—		Trans-Europe Express
"The Robots"	1978	25	—	23	—	—	—	—	—	—	—		The Man-Machine
"Das Model"	1978	—	—	—	—	—	—	43	—	—	—		The Man-Machine
"Neon Lights"	1978	—	—	—	—	—	—	—	—	53	—		The Man-Machine
"Pocket Calculator"	1981	63	—	—	—	—	—	—	—	39	—		Computer World
"Numbers"	1981	—	—	—	—	—	—	—	—	—	—		Computer World
"Computerwelt"	1981	—	—	—	—	—	—	—	—	—	—		Computer World
"The Model" / "Computer Love"	1981	7	33	—	—	—	4	41	—	1	—	BPI: Gold	The Man-Machine / Computer World
"Tour de France"	1983	47	60	—	—	—	20	—	24	22	—		Non-album single
"Musique Non-Stop"	1986	13	—	—	—	—	—	—	45	82	—		Electric Café
"The Telephone Call"	1987	—	—	—	—	—	—	—	—	89	—		Electric Café
"The Robots"	1991	18	161	—	—	—	26	—	—	20	—		The Mix
"Radioactivity"	1991	—	—	—	—	—	—	—	—	43	—		The Mix
"Expo 2000"	1999	35	142	—	—	—	—	95	—	27	—		Non-album single
"Tour de France 2003"	2003	50	103	—	—	—	—	—	—	20	—		Tour de France Soundtracks
"Elektro Kardiogramm"	2003	—	—	—	—	—	—	—	—	—	—		Tour de France Soundtracks
"Aerodynamik"	2004	80	—	—	—	—	—	—	—	33	—		Tour de France Soundtracks
"Aerodynamik" / "La Forme"	2007	79	—	—	—	—	—	—	—	78	—		Tour de France Soundtracks
"Heimcomputer / Home Computer"	2021	—	—	—	—	—	—	—	—	—	—		Computer World
"Autobahn" / "Kometenmelodie 2"	2024	—	—	—	—	—	—	—	—	—	—		Autobahn

== Video albums ==
- 2005: Minimum-Maximum
- 2017: 3-D The Catalogue
- 2017: 3-D Der Katalog

== Music videos ==
Year	Title	Director
1974	"Autobahn"	
1975	"Radioactivity"	
1975	"Antenna"	
1978	"The Robots"	Günter Fröhling
1979	"Autobahn"	Roger Mainwood
1981	"Pocket Calculator"	
1982	"Neon Lights"	Günter Fröhling
1982	"Trans-Europe Express"	Florian Schneider and Ralf Hütter
1982	"Showroom Dummies"	
1983	"Tour de France"	
1986	"Music Non-Stop"	Rebecca Allen[ref]
1987	"The Telephone Call"	Günter Fröhling
1991	"The Robots"	Florian Schneider and Ralf Hütter
2000	"Expo 2000"	
2003	"Tour De France Étape 2"	D.E. Macken
