= 3-D – The Catalogue =

3-D The Catalogue

Live album by Kraftwerk
- Released: 26 May 2017
- Recorded: 9 April 2012 – 14 October 2016
- Venues: Museum of Modern Art (New York City); Kunstsammlung Nordrhein-Westfalen (Düsseldorf); Tate Modern (London); Akasaka Blitz (Tokyo); Sydney Opera House (Sydney); Walt Disney Concert Hall (Los Angeles); Burgtheater (Vienna); Fondation Louis Vuitton (Paris); Neue Nationalgalerie (Berlin); Paradiso (Amsterdam); Koncerthuset (Copenhagen); Oslo Opera House (Oslo); Guggenheim Museum Bilbao (Bilbao)
- Genres: Electronic; synth pop
- Length: 285:49
- Labels: Kling Klang; Parlophone
- Producer: None listed

Kraftwerk chronology
| The Catalogue (2009) | 3-D The Catalogue (2017) | Remixes (2020) |

Professional ratings
Review scores
| Source | Rating |
|---|---|
| AllMusic | 3.5/5 stars |
| Classic Rock | 4/5 stars |
| The Independent | 5/5 stars |
| Q | 4/5 stars |
| Record Collector | 5/5 stars |
| Resident Advisor | 3.7/5 |
| Uncut | 3.5/5 stars |

3-D – The Catalogue (German: 3-D – Der Katalog) is the second official live album by German electronic music band Kraftwerk. It was released on 26 May 2017 on several format iterations, including a deluxe four-disc Blu-ray box set with Dolby Atmos multichannel audio and continuous 3D movies accompanying the audio as well as a large hardback book of photos; an eight-disc CD box set; and a nine-disc vinyl box set. It consists of live versions of every studio album Kraftwerk song from Autobahn (1974) to Tour de France Soundtracks (2003), although crowd noise was removed from the recordings. The performances were recorded between April 2012 and October 2016 at venues around the world. The album was nominated for Best Surround Sound Album and won Best Dance/Electronic Album at the 60th Annual Grammy Awards, the band's first Grammy win.

== Contents ==
According to the liner notes, the album documents Kraftwerk's 1 2 3 4 5 6 7 8 tour at various museums and concert halls around the world:

- Museum of Modern Art in New York City (9–17 April 2012)
- Kunstsammlung Nordrhein-Westfalen in Düsseldorf (11–20 January 2013)
- Tate Modern in London (6–14 February 2013)
- Akasaka Blitz in Tokyo (8–16 May 2013)
- Sydney Opera House (24–27 May 2013)
- Walt Disney Concert Hall in Los Angeles (18–21 March 2014)
- Burgtheater in Vienna (15–18 May 2014)
- Fondation Louis Vuitton in Paris (6–14 November 2014)
- Neue Nationalgalerie in Berlin (6-13 January 2015)
- Paradiso in Amsterdam (16–23 January 2015)
- DR Koncerthuset in Copenhagen (26 February – 1 March 2015)
- Oslo Opera House (4–7 August 2016)
- Guggenheim Museum Bilbao (7–14 October 2016)

== Track listing ==
CD

Disc one: Autobahn
| No. | Title | Writer(s) | Length |
|---|---|---|---|
| 1. | "Autobahn" | Ralf Hütter, Florian Schneider, Emil Schult | 14:29 |
| 2. | "Kometenmelodie 1" | Hütter, Schneider | 5:29 |
| 3. | "Kometenmelodie 2" | Hütter, Schneider | 3:30 |
| 4. | "Mitternacht" | Hütter, Schneider | 2:12 |
| 5. | "Morgenspaziergang" | Hütter, Schneider | 1:20 |

Disc two: Radioactivity (German: Radio-Aktivität)
| No. | Title | Writer(s) | Length |
|---|---|---|---|
| 1. | "Geiger Counter" ("Geigerzähler") | Hütter, Schneider | 0:32 |
| 2. | "Radioactivity" ("Radioaktivität") | Hütter, Schneider, Schult | 6:16 |
| 3. | "Radioland" | Hütter, Schneider, Schult | 5:55 |
| 4. | "Airwaves" ("Ätherwellen") | Hütter, Schneider, Schult | 6:01 |
| 5. | "Intermission" ("Sendepause") | Hütter, Schneider | 0:25 |
| 6. | "News" ("Nachrichten") | Hütter, Schneider | 1:15 |
| 7. | "The Voice of Energy" ("Die Stimme der Energie") | Hütter, Schneider, Schult | 0:52 |
| 8. | "Antenna" ("Antenne") | Hütter, Schneider, Schult | 3:36 |
| 9. | "Radio Stars" ("Radio Sterne") | Hütter, Schneider, Schult | 2:18 |
| 10. | "Uranium" ("Uran") | Hütter, Schneider, Schult | 1:26 |
| 11. | "Transistor" | Hütter, Schneider | 1:14 |
| 12. | "Ohm Sweet Ohm" | Hütter, Schneider | 2:58 |

Disc three: Trans-Europe Express (German: Trans Europa Express)
| No. | Title | Writer(s) | Length |
|---|---|---|---|
| 1. | "Trans-Europe Express" ("Trans Europa Express") | Hütter, Schult | 3:21 |
| 2. | "Metal on Metal" ("Metall auf Metall") | Hütter | 2:08 |
| 3. | "Abzug" | Hütter | 2:25 |
| 4. | "Showroom Dummies" ("Schaufensterpuppen") | Hütter | 3:40 |
| 5. | "Franz Schubert" | Hütter | 1:12 |
| 6. | "Europe Endless" ("Europa Endlos") | Hütter, Schneider | 5:52 |
| 7. | "The Hall of Mirrors" ("Spiegelsaal") | Hütter, Schneider, Schult | 5:22 |

Disc four: The Man-Machine (German: Die Mensch-Maschine)
| No. | Title | Writer(s) | Length |
|---|---|---|---|
| 1. | "The Man-Machine" ("Die Mensch-Maschine") | Hütter, Karl Bartos | 5:10 |
| 2. | "Spacelab" | Hütter, Bartos | 5:28 |
| 3. | "Metropolis" | Hütter, Schneider, Bartos | 5:46 |
| 4. | "The Model" ("Das Model") | Hütter, Bartos, Schult | 3:39 |
| 5. | "Neon Lights" ("Neonlicht") | Hütter, Schneider, Bartos | 5:45 |
| 6. | "The Robots" ("Die Roboter") | Hütter, Schneider, Bartos | 7:44 |

Disc five: Computer World (German: Computerwelt)
| No. | Title | Writer(s) | Length |
|---|---|---|---|
| 1. | "Numbers" ("Nummern") | Hütter, Schneider, Bartos | 2:59 |
| 2. | "Computer World" ("Computerwelt") | Hütter, Schneider, Schult, Bartos | 3:21 |
| 3. | "It's More Fun to Compute" | Hütter, Schneider, Bartos | 1:03 |
| 4. | "Home Computer" ("Heimcomputer") | Hütter, Schneider, Bartos | 5:08 |
| 5. | "Computer Love" ("Computerliebe") | Hütter, Schult, Bartos | 6:33 |
| 6. | "Pocket Calculator" ("Taschenrechner") | Hütter, Schult, Bartos | 3:26 |
| 7. | "Dentaku" | Hütter, Schult, Bartos | 3:08 |

Disc six: Techno Pop
| No. | Title | Writer(s) | Length |
|---|---|---|---|
| 1. | "Boing Boom Tschak" | Hütter, Schneider, Bartos | 2:32 |
| 2. | "Techno Pop" | Hütter, Schneider, Bartos, Schult | 2:45 |
| 3. | "Music Non Stop" ("Musik Non Stop") | Hütter, Schneider, Bartos | 7:44 |
| 4. | "Electric Cafe" | Hütter, Schneider, Bartos, Maxime Schmitt | 3:51 |
| 5. | "The Telephone Call" ("Der Telefon Anruf") | Hütter, Schneider, Bartos | 2:45 |
| 6. | "House Phone" | Hütter, Schneider, Bartos | 2:30 |
| 7. | "Sex Object" ("Sex Objekt") | Hütter, Schneider, Bartos | 5:30 |

Disc seven: The Mix (Headphone Surround 3D mix)
| No. | Title | Writer(s) | Length |
|---|---|---|---|
| 1. | "The Robots" ("Die Roboter") | Hütter, Schneider, Bartos | 7:44 |
| 2. | "Computer Love" ("Computer Liebe") | Hütter, Schult, Bartos | 6:34 |
| 3. | "Pocket Calculator" ("Taschenrechner") | Hütter, Schult, Bartos | 3:26 |
| 4. | "Dentaku" | Hütter, Schult, Bartos | 3:09 |
| 5. | "Autobahn" | Hütter, Schneider, Schult | 14:27 |
| 6. | "Geiger Counter" ("Geigerzähler") | Hütter, Schneider | 0:31 |
| 7. | "Radioactivity" ("Radioaktivität") | Hütter, Schneider, Schult | 6:16 |
| 8. | "Trans-Europe Express" ("Trans Europa Express") | Hütter, Schult | 3:21 |
| 9. | "Metal on Metal" ("Metall auf Metall") | Hütter | 2:08 |
| 10. | "Abzug" | Hütter | 2:24 |
| 11. | "Home Computer" ("Heimcomputer") | Hütter, Schneider, Bartos | 6:11 |
| 12. | "Boing Boom Tschak" | Hütter, Schneider, Bartos | 2:33 |
| 13. | "Techno Pop" | Hütter, Schneider, Bartos, Schult | 2:46 |
| 14. | "Music Non Stop" ("Musik Non Stop") | Hütter, Schneider, Bartos | 7:44 |
| 15. | "Planet of Visions" ("Planet der Visionen") | Hütter, Schneider, Fritz Hilpert | 7:52 |

Disc eight: Tour de France
| No. | Title | Writer(s) | Length |
|---|---|---|---|
| 1. | "Tour de France" | Hütter, Schneider, Bartos, Schmitt | 4:18 |
| 2. | "Prologue" | Hütter, Schneider, Hilpert | 0:27 |
| 3. | "Étape 1" | Hütter, Schneider, Hilpert, Schmitt | 3:46 |
| 4. | "Chrono" | Hütter, Schneider, Hilpert, Schmitt | 1:12 |
| 5. | "Étape 2" | Hütter, Schneider, Hilpert, Schmitt | 4:59 |
| 6. | "Elektro Kardiogramm" | Hütter, Hilpert | 4:37 |
| 7. | "Aéro Dynamik" | Hütter, Hilpert, Schmitt | 5:59 |
| 8. | "Vitamin" | Hütter, Schneider, Hilpert | 5:54 |
| 9. | "La Forme" | Hütter, Schmitt | 6:19 |
| 10. | "Régéneration" | Hütter, Schmitt | 0:28 |

== Awards and achievements ==
=== Grammy Awards ===
| Year | Nominee / work | Award | Result |
|---|---|---|---|
| 2018 | 3-D – The Catalogue | Best Dance/Electronic Album | Won |
| 2018 | 3-D – The Catalogue | Best Surround Sound Album | Nominated |

== Charts ==
=== Weekly charts ===
| Chart (2017) | Peak position |
|---|---|
| Austrian Albums (Ö3 Austria) | 26 |
| Belgian Albums (Ultratop Flanders) | 7 |
| Belgian Albums (Ultratop Wallonia) | 79 |
| Croatian International Albums (HDU) | 22 |
| Dutch Albums (Album Top 100) | 44 |
| French Albums (SNEP) | 171 |
| German Albums (Offizielle Top 100) | 4 |
| Hungarian Albums (MAHASZ) | 10 |
| Italian Albums (FIMI) | 75 |
| Scottish Albums (Official Charts) | 11 |
| Swiss Albums (Schweizer Hitparade) | 25 |
| UK Albums (Official Charts) | 24 |
| UK Dance Albums (Official Charts) | 10 |

=== Year-end charts ===
| Chart (2017) | Position |
|---|---|
| German Albums (Offizielle Top 100) | 77 |
