= Minimum-Maximum =

Live album by Kraftwerk
- Released: 6 June 2005
- Recorded: 2004
- Genre: Electronic
- Length: 120:39 (combined)
- Label: Kling Klang; EMI; Astralwerks
- Producer: Ralf Hütter; Florian Schneider

Kraftwerk chronology
| Tour de France Soundtracks (2003) | Minimum-Maximum (2005) | The Catalogue (2009) |

Minimum-Maximum is the first official live album release by Kraftwerk, released in June 2005, almost 35 years after the group gave its first live performance. The album features two CDs of tracks recorded on the group's world tour during 2004, including concerts in Warsaw, Ljubljana, Moscow, Berlin, London, Budapest, Tallinn, Riga, Tokyo, and San Francisco.

Like many of its studio albums, Minimum-Maximum was released in two different language versions: the band's native German, and English for the international market, although of the 23 tracks on the album, only the recordings of "The Model", "Radioactivity", "Trans Europe Express"/"Metal on Metal", "Computer World", "Pocket Calculator" and "The Robots" are actually different between the releases. The album title, an excerpt from the lyrics of the song "Elektro-Kardiogramm" (which only exists in an English-language version), is the same for both German and English versions.

In an interview for Mojo, Ralf Hütter regretted the fact that they could not include recordings from their 2004 concert in Santiago de Chile:

"We have great recordings from Santiago, Chile, but couldn’t incorporate them into Minimum-Maximum because we'd already mixed the album," says Ralf. "The Chileans were the only audience in the world who clap in time, in perfect synchronisation."

The album was also released as a double live concert DVD with DTS 5.1 sound on 5 December 2005.

The track "Planet of Visions" is a reworked version of the song "Expo 2000", based on a 2001 remix by Underground Resistance. The vocoder text "Sellafield 2" at the start of "Radioactivity"/"Radioaktivität" is included for the first time on the CD and DVD set. The intro vocoder text before "The Man-Machine"/"Die Mensch-Maschine" is included only on the DVD release.

Minimum-Maximum was nominated for the 2006 Grammy Award for Best Electronic/Dance Album.

== Critical reception ==
Professional ratings
Aggregate scores
| Source | Rating |
|---|---|
| Metacritic | 86/100 |
Review scores
| Source | Rating |
| AllMusic | 3.5/5 stars |
| Blender | 4/5 stars |
| Drowned in Sound | 8/10 |
| The Guardian | 4/5 stars |
| Mojo | 4.5/5 stars |
| NME | 8/10 |
| Pitchfork | 9.0/10 |
| PopMatters | 6/10 |
| Q | 4.5/5 stars |
| URB | 5/5 stars |

Minimum-Maximum received critical acclaim. At Metacritic, which assigns a normalized rating out of 100 to reviews from mainstream publications, the album received an average score of 86, based on 17 reviews, which indicates "universal acclaim".

== Track listing ==
=== English version ===
==== Disc one ====
1. "The Man-Machine" (Karl Bartos, Florian Schneider, Ralf Hütter) Warszawa, Sala Kongresowa - 27.05.04 – 7:55
2. "Planet of Visions" (Fritz Hilpert, Hütter, Florian Schneider) Ljubljana, Križanke - 24.05.04 – 4:45
3. "Tour de France (Étape 1)" (Hilpert, Hütter, Maxime Schmitt, Schneider) Riga, Olimpiska Hall - 29.05.04 – 4:22
4. "Chrono" (Hilpert, Hütter, Schneider, Schmitt) Riga, Olimpiska Hall - 29.05.04 – 1:29
5. "Tour de France (Étape 2)" (Hilpert, Hütter, Schmitt, Schneider) Riga, Olimpiska Hall - 29.05.04 – 4:48
6. "Vitamin" (Hilpert, Hütter) Moscow, Lushniki - 03.06.04 – 6:41
7. "Tour de France" (Bartos, Hütter, Schmitt, Schneider) Paris, Le Grand Rex - 22.03.04 – 6:18
8. "Autobahn" (Hütter, Schneider, Emil Schult) Berlin, Tempodrom - 25.03.04 – 8:51
9. "The Model" (Bartos, Hütter, Schult) London, Brixton Academy - 20.03.04 – 3:41
10. "Neon Lights" (Bartos, Hütter, Schneider) London, Royal Festival Hall - 18.03.04 – 5:58

==== Disc two ====
1. "Radioactivity" (Hütter, Schneider, Schult) Warszawa, Sala Kongresowa - 27.05.04 – 7:41
2. "Trans-Europe Express" (Hütter, Schult) Budapest, Sportaréna - 25.05.04 – 5:01
3. "Metal on Metal" (Hütter) Budapest, Sportaréna - 25.05.04 – 4:28
4. "Numbers" (Bartos, Hütter, Schneider) San Francisco, The Warfield - 28.04.04 – 4:27
5. "Computer World" (Bartos, Hütter, Schneider) Moscow, Lushniki - 03.06.04 – 2:55
6. "Home Computer" (Bartos, Hütter, Schneider) Warszawa, Sala Kongresowa - 27.05.04 – 5:55
7. "Pocket Calculator" (Bartos, Hütter, Schneider) Moscow, Lushniki - 03.06.04 – 2:58
8. "Dentaku" (Bartos, Hütter, Schneider) Tokyo, Shibuya Ax - 04.03.04 – 3:15
9. "The Robots" (Bartos, Hütter, Schneider) Moscow, Lushniki - 03.06.04 – 7:23
10. "Elektro Kardiogramm" (Hilpert, Hütter) Tallinn, Exhibition Hall - 30.05.04 – 4:41
11. "Aéro Dynamik" (Hilpert, Hütter, Schneider, Schmitt) Riga, Olimpiska Hall - 29.05.04 – 7:14
12. "Musique Non-Stop" (Bartos, Hütter, Schneider) Moscow, Lushniki - 03.06.04 – 9:51

=== German version ===
==== Disc one ====
1. "Die Mensch-Maschine" (Karl Bartos, Florian Schneider, Ralf Hütter) Warszawa, Sala Kongresowa – 7:55
2. "Planet der Visionen" (Fritz Hilpert, Hütter, Florian Schneider) Ljubljana, Križanke – 4:45
3. "Tour de France (Étape 1)" (Hilpert, Hütter, Maxime Schmitt, Schneider) Riga, Olimpiska Hall – 4:22
4. "Chrono" (Hilpert, Hütter, Schneider, Schmitt) Riga, Olimpiska Hall – 1:29
5. "Tour de France (Étape 2)" (Hilpert, Hütter, Schmitt, Schneider) Riga, Olimpiska Hall – 4:48
6. "Vitamin" (Hilpert, Hütter) Moscow, Lushniki – 6:41
7. "Tour de France" (Bartos, Hütter, Schmitt, Schneider) Paris, Le Grand Rex – 6:18
8. "Autobahn" (Hütter, Schneider, Emil Schult) Berlin, Tempodrom – 8:51
9. "Das Model" (Bartos, Hütter, Schult) Berlin, Tempodrom – 3:41
10. "Neonlicht" (Bartos, Hütter, Schneider) London, Royal Festival Hall – 5:58

==== Disc two ====
1. "Radioaktivität" (Hütter, Schneider, Schult) Tallinn, Exhibition Hall – 7:41
2. "Trans-Europa Express" (Hütter, Schult) Riga, Olimpiska Hall – 3:21
3. "Abzug" (Hütter) Riga, Olimpiska Hall – 1:40
4. "Metall auf Metall" (Hütter) Riga, Olimpiska Hall – 4:28
5. "Nummern" (Bartos, Hütter, Schneider) San Francisco, The Warfield – 4:27
6. "Computerwelt" (Bartos, Hütter, Schneider, Schult) Riga, Olimpiska Hall – 2:55
7. "Heimcomputer" (Bartos, Hütter, Schneider) Warszawa, Sala Kongresowa – 5:55
8. "Taschenrechner" (Bartos, Hütter, Schneider) Berlin, Tempodrom – 2:58
9. "Dentaku" (Bartos, Hütter, Schneider) Tokyo, Shibuya Ax – 3:15
10. "Die Roboter" (Bartos, Hütter, Schneider) Berlin, Tempodrom – 7:23
11. "Elektro-Kardiogramm" (Hilpert, Hütter) Tallinn, Exhibition Hall – 4:41
12. "Aero Dynamik" (Hilpert, Hütter, Schneider, Schmitt) Riga, Olimpiska Hall – 7:14
13. "Music Non-Stop" (Bartos, Hütter, Schneider) Moscow, Lushniki – 9:51

In the German version of the track listing (as on The Mix album) after "Trans-Europa Express" is an extra title, "Abzug", followed by "Metall auf Metall". For the international version of the album the title "Abzug" was dropped and the music incorporated as part of "Trans-Europe Express", thus making the disc appear to be one track shorter. The original 1977 German album has these track titles in a different order, though the music is basically the same arrangement.

== Notebook ==
A special edition box set entitled Notebook, comprising both the DVDs and audio CDs plus a commemorative hardback book of tour photos, was also issued, in both German- and English-language versions. The box is designed to resemble a laptop computer, with the front cover of the book being the keyboard (with German keyboard layout).

== Personnel ==
- Ralf Hütter – vocals, software synthesizers, sequencing
- Henning Schmitz – software synthesizers, sequencing, sound engineer (album mix)
- Fritz Hilpert – software synthesizers, sequencing, sound engineer (album mix)
- Florian Schneider – supplementary vocals, software synthesizers, sequencing

== Equipment ==
The performances were created using 10 Sony VAIO laptops containing Mobile Intel Pentium 4 M processors. Four were used for audio, running Steinberg Cubase SX, the remaining 6 provided the video system.

Since 2002, all sounds were created using virtual technology (i.e., software replicating and replacing original analogue or digital equipment). According to an interview in 2009 with Fritz Hilpert, "the mobility of music technology and the reliability of the notebooks and software have greatly simplified the realization of complex touring setups: we generate all sounds on the laptops in real time and manipulate them with controller maps. It takes almost no time to get our compact stage system set up for performance. […] This way, we can bring our Kling-Klang Studio with us on stage. The physical light weight of our equipment also translates into an enormous ease of use when working with software synthesizers and sound processors. Every tool imaginable is within immediate reach or just a few mouse clicks away on the Internet."

== Charts ==
=== Weekly charts ===
| Chart (2005) | Peak position |
|---|---|
| Austrian Albums (Ö3 Austria) | 33 |
| Belgian Albums (Ultratop Flanders) | 20 |
| Belgian Albums (Ultratop Wallonia) | 45 |
| Dutch Albums (Album Top 100) | 93 |
| French Albums (SNEP) | 123 |
| German Albums (Offizielle Top 100) | 26 |
| Hungarian Albums (MAHASZ) | 29 |
| Italian Albums (FIMI) | 44 |
| Scottish Albums (OCC) | 30 |
| Swedish Albums (Sverigetopplistan) | 29 |
| Swiss Albums (Schweizer Hitparade) | 58 |
| UK Albums (OCC) | 29 |
| US Top Dance Albums (Billboard) | 4 |

== Release history ==
| Region | Date | Label | Format | Catalog number | Lyrics |
|---|---|---|---|---|---|
| Germany | 6 June 2005 | EMI | CD | 3 12046 2 | German |
| Germany | 6 June 2005 | EMI | 4 x vinyl | 3 11828 1 | German |
| EU except Germany | 6 June 2005 | EMI | CD | 560 6112 | English |
| EU except Germany | 6 June 2005 | EMI | 4 x vinyl | 560 6111 | English |
| EU except Germany | 24 April 2006 | EMI | SACD | 3 34996 2 | English |
| United States | 7 June 2005 | Astralwerks | CD | ASW 60611 | English |
| Japan | 10 August 2005 | EMI | CD | TOCP-66427 | German |
| Japan | 10 August 2005 | EMI | CD | TOCP-66425 | English |
| Australasia | 18 July 2005 | EMI | CD | 7243 5 60616 2 0 (Australian 2 CD release) | English |
| EU except Germany | ? | EMI | 2 DVD | 336 2949 | English |
