= Expo 2000 (song) =

Single by Kraftwerk
- Released: June 1999
- Recorded: 1999
- Genre: Electronic; synthpop
- Length: 3:35 (Radio Mix)
- Label: Kling Klang; EMI; Astralwerks
- Songwriters: Ralf Hütter; Florian Schneider
- Producers: Ralf Hütter; Florian Schneider; Fritz Hilpert; Henning Schmitz

Kraftwerk singles chronology
"Radioactivity" (1991)	"Expo 2000" (1999)	"Tour de France 2003" (2003)

"Expo 2000" is a song by Kraftwerk. It was originally an a cappella jingle commissioned for the Hanover Expo 2000 world's fair in Germany, which was subsequently developed into longer pieces with music and additional lyrics. It was the group's first commercial recording of new, original music since the release of the 1986 album Electric Café.

The "Expo 2000" single was first released on CD and twelve-inch vinyl in December 1999 by EMI in Germany and in January 2000 elsewhere in Europe. It reached No. 27 in the UK singles chart in March 2000.

In November 2000, a collection of remixes was released, titled Expo Remix, featuring contributions from various producers, including long-term collaborator François Kevorkian, Orbital, and members of the Detroit techno collective Underground Resistance. Both releases were combined and issued on one CD by Astralwerks Records in the US and Canada in October 2001.

"Expo 2000" was later reworked to remove all Expo references and subsequently titled "Planet of Visions" (German: "Planet der Visionen"). This reworked version has been played live extensively on all Kraftwerk tours since. It is featured on the live releases Minimum-Maximum and 3-D The Catalogue. On the latter, it is featured as part of The Mix disc. The song can be heard in the 2001 Kollaboration 2001 viral video featuring Mike Song and David Elsewhere.

== Jingle ==
The original Expo theme was a typically Kraftwerk vocoder-voice singing the phrase "Expo 2000" in six languages: German, English, French, Russian, Spanish, Japanese. In total, the piece lasted thirty seconds. This "Expo-Jingle" was only available for download from the Expo 2000 website for a limited period and on the limited edition official Expo 2000 souvenir CD.

The jingle was used during the Expo 2000 world's fair, according to the official Expo 2000 website, "to announce Expo stops in buses, trains or planes, when prizes and awards are presented, at press conferences, during radio and television broadcasts, as a welcoming tune on the internet, as music on hold for the Expo Call Center, or when performances begin and as an intermission signal at Expo events."

There was criticism in Germany at the time about the size of the fee paid – 400,000 DM (which would have been approximately €204,500 in 1999) – for such a brief and simple piece of music.

We were in the middle of working on an album, and weren't able to play a one-off concert to open Expo. While I was talking to the artistic director, he asked Kraftwerk to produce an electronic sound for Expo; for computers, phones and all electronic communications. I think he had something like the Windows opening signature in mind. The history of Expo I knew from Paris, which was the beginning; when European composers such as Debussy and the like were confronted with ethnic music from Bali, Africa and elsewhere for the first time. It was cultural as well as technological. So the whole idea in the spirit of the musical world and history came to our mind. Let's work with languages and computer languages; Russian, Japanese, Latin, German, and just make it an idea: (imitates electronic voice) "EXPO 2000". But then we liked it and didn't want to just do four seconds, so we made a whole composition.

— Ralf Hütter

== Track listing ==
All tracks are written by Kraftwerk.

Expo 2000
No.	Title	Length
1.	"Expo 2000 (Radio Mix)"	3:35
2.	"Expo 2000 (Kling Klang Mix 2000)"	6:48
3.	"Expo 2000 (Kling Klang Mix 2002)"	5:36
4.	"Expo 2000 (Kling Klang Mix 2001)"	6:50

Expo Remix
No.	Title	Length
1.	"Expo 2000 (Orbital Mix)"	4:57
2.	"Expo 2000 (François K + Rob Rives Mix)"	7:21
3.	"Expo 2000 (DJ Rolando Mix)"	7:29
4.	"Expo 2000 (Underground Resistance Mix)"	3:58
5.	"Expo 2000 (UR Infiltrated Mix)"	3:26
6.	"Expo 2000 (UR Thought 3 Mix)"	2:43

== Charts ==
=== Weekly charts ===
Chart (1999–2000)	Peak position
Australia (ARIA)	142
Belgium (Ultratip Bubbling Under Flanders)	11
Germany (GfK)	35
Netherlands (Single Top 100)	95
Scotland Singles (OCC)	34
Sweden (Sverigetopplistan)	36
Switzerland (Schweizer Hitparade)	95
UK Singles (OCC)	27
UK Dance (OCC)	27
