= Tour de France 2003 =

Single by Kraftwerk

from the album Tour de France Soundtracks
- Released: 7 July 2003
- Studio: Kling Klang (Düsseldorf, Germany)
- Genre: Minimal techno; trance
- Length: 3:27 (Version 1); 3:25 (Version 2); 3:36 (Version 3); 7:44 (Version 2 extended mix)
- Label: Kling Klang; EMI; Capitol; Astralwerks
- Composer(s): Fritz Hilpert; Ralf Hütter; Florian Schneider
- Lyricist(s): Ralf Hütter
- Producer(s): Ralf Hütter; Florian Schneider

Kraftwerk singles chronology
"Expo 2000" (1999)	"Tour de France 2003" (2003)	"Elektro Kardiogramm" (2003)

"Tour de France 2003" is a maxi single released by German electronic music band Kraftwerk. It was released as the lead single from their tenth studio album, Tour de France Soundtracks (2003), on 7 July 2003. It contains three different versions, along with one extended mix, of the composition "Tour de France 2003", listed on the album as "Tour de France Étape 1", "Tour de France Étape 2", and "Tour de France Étape 3".

== Track listing ==
CD single

1. "Tour de France 2003 (Version 1)" – 3:27
2. "Tour de France 2003 (Version 2)" – 3:25
3. "Tour de France 2003 (Version 3)" – 3:36
4. "Tour de France 2003 (Long Distance Version 2)" – 7:44

12-inch single

Side A

1. "Tour de France 2003 (Long Distance Version 2)" – 7:44

Side B

1. "Tour de France 2003 (Version 1)" – 3:27
2. "Tour de France 2003 (Version 3)" – 3:36

== Charts ==
Chart performance for "Tour de France 2003"
Chart (2003)	Peak position
Australia (ARIA)	103
Denmark (Tracklisten)	9
Europe (Eurochart Hot 100 Singles)	41
Finland (Suomen virallinen lista)	18
Germany (GfK)	50
Hungary (Single Top 40)	9
Italy (FIMI)	36
Scotland (OCC)	23
Spain (PROMUSICAE)	4
Sweden (Sverigetopplistan)	21
UK Singles (OCC)	20
US Dance Singles Sales (Billboard)	13
