= Tour de France (song) =

1983 single by Kraftwerk

Single by Kraftwerk
- Released: July 1983
- Recorded: 1983
- Studio: Kling Klang (Düsseldorf, Germany)
- Genre: Electronic
- Length: 6:30 (full version); 3:00 (short edit)
- Label: Kling Klang; EMI; Warner Bros.
- Composers: Karl Bartos; Ralf Hütter; Florian Schneider
- Lyricists: Ralf Hütter; Maxime Schmitt
- Producers: Ralf Hütter; Florian Schneider

Kraftwerk singles chronology
"Computerwelt" (1982)	"Tour de France" (1983)	"Musique Non-Stop" (1986)

"Tour de France"

Song by Kraftwerk

from the album Tour de France Soundtracks
- Released: 4 August 2003
- Studio: Kling Klang (Düsseldorf, Germany)
- Genre: Techno
- Length: 5:12
- Label: Kling Klang; EMI
- Composers: Karl Bartos; Ralf Hütter; Florian Schneider
- Lyricists: Ralf Hütter; Maxime Schmitt
- Producers: Ralf Hütter; Florian Schneider

"Tour de France" is a song by German electronic band Kraftwerk. It was first issued in July 1983 to coincide with the 80th anniversary of the first Tour de France bicycle race, peaking at number 22 in the United Kingdom singles chart on 21 August.

== Background ==
It is notable for the use of sampled voices and mechanical sounds associated with cycling that were used to supplement a simple electro-percussion pattern – an approach Kraftwerk had used on earlier tracks such as "Metal on Metal" (from Trans-Europe Express) and "Numbers" (from Computer World). The music is credited to Ralf Hütter, Florian Schneider and Karl Bartos; the lyrics are credited to Hütter and Maxime Schmitt, a French label associate of the band. The melody appears to quote a fragment of the opening section of Paul Hindemith's "Sonata for Flute and Piano" ("Heiter Bewegt").

The sleeve design depicted the band on road bikes in a paceline, superimposed across an angled representation of the French national flag. The design was adapted from an image that had appeared on a 1953 Hungarian postage stamp, one of a sport-themed set commemorating the opening the Népstadion (People's Stadium) in Budapest. The piece was also included in the 1984 film Breakin', also known as Breakdance internationally. Although the song did appear briefly in the film, Kraftwerk did not let the song appear on the movie soundtrack; instead, a cover version of the song was released by a group called "10 Speed".

== Composition ==
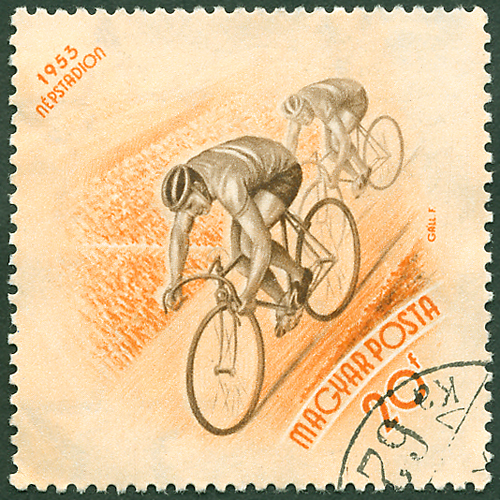
The 1953 Hungarian postage stamp that formed the basis for the cycling motif

For Kraftwerk, "Tour de France" was a departure from the technological tone of the two previous albums, The Man-Machine and Computer World. Instead, the song is a joie de vivre celebration of cycling, marking the group's increasing interest in the sport. Of the current line-up, Hütter and Fritz Hilpert have been known to take part in cycling events. The track was originally recorded with the intention of being included on the subsequently abandoned Techno Pop album. The single was originally released on seven and twelve inch vinyl, and as a cassette-single. It has the most complicated set of variants of any Kraftwerk song, having been variously edited and remixed to the point that there is no completely definitive version.

== Releases ==
=== Original release ===
In Germany it was released in both German- and French-language versions in March 1983 and it grew traction in the UK via Radio Luxembourg where listeners would have usually heard it between 1-3am GMT once a month. Typically seven-inch sides were edited down versions of the longer tracks released on twelve-inch singles. In the UK however the seven-inch B-side was an instrumental edit of the A-side track; an additional instrumental track of percussion and samples, "Tour de France, Étape 2", was included on the UK twelve-inch and cassette releases.

=== Remix release ===
On 22 June 1984 the song was re-released in two new versions: a substantially different and largely instrumental arrangement, remixed by François Kevorkian in New York; and a Kraftwerk-remixed alternative version of the original arrangement, featuring longer percussive sections than the 1983 version in the latter half of the track. Sleeves for later UK pressings of this version included the message "As featured in the film Breakdance" on the front. The remix reached number 24 on the UK Singles Chart and number 4 on the US Hot Dance Music/Club Play chart.

=== Digital remaster ===
In October 1999, the recordings were digitally remastered and released, this time as a CD and a twelve-inch single, with a slightly modified version of the original cover design: the faces of former members Karl Bartos and Wolfgang Flür, who had left the band by 1999, were replaced by faces presumably representing current members Fritz Hilpert and Henning Schmitz.

The 1999 vinyl twelve-inch had the 1984 Kraftwerk remix as the A side (now sub-titled "Kling Klang Analog Mix") and the Kevorkian version as the B side (re-titled "Remix François K"). The CD also included the 1983 seven-inch single edited mix of the song (re-titled "Radio Version") and a QuickTime format file of the video, featuring an edited version of the 1984 Kraftwerk remix with German lyrics ("Multi-Media-Track") over an amended video. The video itself was re-edited to remove sequences showing the 1983 incarnation of the band and now comprised only archive footage of Tour de France cyclists, such as the Italian champion Fausto Coppi and the French champion Jacques Anquetil.

=== 2003 version ===
A completely new recording was made for the 2003 album Tour de France Soundtracks, based on the original 1983 arrangement. The album was remastered and re-released in 2009.

=== Music videos ===
For the 1983 release a video clip with cycling footage was released. The 1984 Kevorkian version had a rare video which included footage of the band members in Düsseldorf on their bicycles. The 1999 release had the same video as the 1983 Version.

== Track listing ==
UK 12-inch vinyl, 1983 Catalog number: 12 EMI 5413

1. "Tour de France (Long Version)" – 6:30 ¹
2. "Tour de France" – 3:00
3. "Tour de France, Étape 2" – 2:40 ²

UK 7-inch vinyl, 1983 Catalog number: EMI 5413

1. "Tour de France" – 3:00
2. "Tour de France (Instrumental)" – 2:40

UK cassette, 1983 Catalog number: TC-EMI 5413

1. "Tour de France (Long Version)" – 6:30
2. "Tour de France" – 3:00
3. "Tour de France, Étape 2" – 2:40 ²

US 12-inch vinyl, 1984 Catalog number: 20146

1. "Tour de France" (6:45)
2. "Tour de France (Remix)" (6:47)

UK 12-inch vinyl, 1984 Catalog number: 12 EMI 5413

1. "Tour de France (Remix)" – 6:47 (François Kevorkian remix)
2. "Tour de France (French Version)" – 6:44 ³ (Kraftwerk remix sung in French)
3. "Tour de France" – 3:00

Has the same catalogue number as the 1983 release

UK 7-inch vinyl, 1984 Catalog number: EMI 5413

1. "Tour de France (Remix)" – 3:55 (Edit of François Kevorkian remix)
2. "Tour de France" – 3:45 (Edit of Kraftwerk remix sung in French)

Has the same catalogue number as the 1983 release

German 12-inch vinyl, 1983 Catalog number: 1CK 052 1652046

1. "Tour de France (Version Allemande)" – 6:30 (sung in German)
2. "Tour de France (Version Française)" – 6:30

German 7-inch vinyl, 1983 Catalog number: 1C 006 1652047

1. "Tour de France (Version Allemande)" – 3:00 (sung in German)
2. "Tour de France (Version Francaise)" – 3:00

German 12-inch vinyl, 1984 (1) Catalog number: 1CK 052 1652046

1. "Tour de France (Version Allemande)" – 6:44 ³ (Kraftwerk remix sung in German)
2. "Tour de France (Version Francaise)" – 6:30

This may be a mis-pressing or promo as it has the same sleeve and catalogue number as the earlier release; replaced by (2) below, it was also released in Australia as EMI ED 85

German 12-inch vinyl, 1984 (2) Catalog number: 1CK 062 2003776

1. "Tour de France (Remix)" – 6:47 (François Kevorkian remix)
2. "Tour de France (Version Allemande)" – 6:44 ³ (though actually this track is sung in French!)
3. "Tour de France" – 3:05

German 7-inch vinyl, 1984 Catalog number: 1C 006 200376-7

1. "Tour de France (Remix)" – 3:50 (Edit of François Kevorkian remix)
2. "Tour de France" – 3:10 (sung in German)

EU 12-inch vinyl, 1999 Catalog number: 7243 8 87421 6 0

1. "Tour de France (Kling Klang Analog Mix)" – 6:44 (1984 Kraftwerk remix sung in French)
2. "Tour de France (Remix François K)" – 6:45 (1984 François Kevorkian remix)

Note 1: "Tour de France (Long Version)" is the same track as "Tour de France (Version Française)".
Note 2: "Tour de France, 2e Étape", (listed as such on sleeves but misleadingly put as "Tour de France (Version)" on the B-side label of the 1983 12" disc and cassette), it is not the same track as the later song from Tour de France Soundtracks that has this title. It is a unique rhythmic instrumental track.
Note 3: On some releases "Tour de France (French Version)" is sub-titled "New York Club Mix", or even "Version Allemande" for the 1984 German Remix 12", though this latter one may have been the result of an error. The track was digitally remastered and re-released as "Tour de France (Kling Klang Analog Mix)" in 1999.

== Charts ==
=== Weekly charts ===
Weekly chart performance for "Tour de France"
Chart (1983–1985)	Peak position
Australia (Kent Music Report)	60
Finland (Suomen virallinen lista)	27
Ireland (IRMA)	20
New Zealand (Recorded Music NZ)	24
Sweden (Sverigetopplistan)	6
UK Singles (OCC)	22
US Dance Club Songs (Billboard)	4
West Germany (GfK)	47

Weekly chart performance for "Tour de France" (1984 remix)
Chart (1999)	Peak position
UK Singles (OCC)	24

Weekly chart performance for "Tour de France" (1999 reissue)
Chart (1999)	Peak position
Germany (GfK)	87
Scotland Singles (OCC)	81
UK Singles (OCC)	61

=== Year-end charts ===
Year-end chart performance for "Tour de France"
Chart (1984)	Position
US Dance Club Songs (Billboard)	37
