= Tour de France Soundtracks =

Album by German band Kraftwerk

Studio album by Kraftwerk
- Released: 4 August 2003
- Studio: Kling Klang (Düsseldorf)
- Genre: Techno
- Length: 55:57
- Language: French; English; German
- Label: Kling Klang; EMI
- Producer: Ralf Hütter; Florian Schneider

Kraftwerk chronology
Klang Box (1997)	Tour de France Soundtracks (2003)	Minimum-Maximum (2005)

Singles from Tour de France Soundtracks
- 1. "Tour de France 2003" Released: July 2003; 2. "Elektro Kardiogramm" Released: October 2003; 3. "Aerodynamik" Released: March 2004; 4. "Aerodynamik/La Forme Remixes" Released: 17 September 2007

Tour de France Soundtracks (renamed to Tour de France for its remastered release) is the eleventh studio album by German electronic music band Kraftwerk. It was first released on 4 August 2003, through Kling Klang and EMI in Europe and Astralwerks in North America. The album was recorded for the 100th anniversary of the first Tour de France bicycle race, although it missed its intended release date for the actual tour. It includes a new recording of their 1983 song of the same name, the cover artwork of both releases being nearly identical. The announcement of the release caused much anticipation, as it had been 17 years since the group had put out a full album of new studio material (1986's Electric Café, also known as Techno Pop). It is also the last studio album to feature Florian Schneider before his departure from the band in 2008 and his death on 21 April 2020.

The album received positive reviews from critics and was a commercial success. It reached No. 1 in Germany, No. 21 in the UK, as well as No. 3 in the US dance charts.

== Composition ==
Kitty Empire of The Observer labeled Tour de France Soundtracks a techno album. Unusually for a Kraftwerk album, it did not have separate German and international vocal mixes, but was released only in one version, with a mix of French, German, and English. The lyrics were co-written by Ralf Hütter and Maxime Schmitt, who had previously been manager of the Capitol label at Pathé-Marconi (part of the EMI group, the company that distributed Kraftwerk's music in France) and had been involved with the band since the mid-1970s.

== Promotion and release ==
Professional ratings
Aggregate scores
Source	Rating
Metacritic	73/100
Review scores
Source	Rating
AllMusic	4/5 stars
Blender	3/5 stars
The Guardian	4/5 stars
Los Angeles Times	3/4 stars
Mojo	4/5 stars
Pitchfork	7.0/10
Q	3/5 stars
Rolling Stone	3/5 stars
Spin	C
Uncut	4/5 stars

"Tour de France" was released in June 1983 and the album includes a new recording of the song. "Tour de France 2003" was released in July 2003 and includes the songs "Tour de France Étape 1", "Tour de France Étape 2" and "Tour de France Étape 3". A short jingle was supplied to the television broadcaster Eurosport for use in their coverage of the 2003 Tour de France. "Elektro Kardiogramm" was released as a promotional single in October 2003. "Aerodynamik" was released as a single in March 2004. "Aerodynamik/La Forme Remixes" was released as a remix single on 17 September 2007, including remixes of the songs "Aerodynamik" and "La Forme" by Hot Chip.

Tour de France Soundtracks took the band on an extensive world tour in 2004. On the tour, they performed the music from four laptop computers running sequencing, sampling, and synthesizer software, also controlling and synchronised with large video displays. In 2005, Kraftwerk released Minimum-Maximum, with separate audio and video releases featuring songs performed at various venues during the 2004 tour.

A newly remastered edition of the album with the revised title Tour de France was released by EMI Records, Mute Records, and Astralwerks Records on CD and digital download in October–November 2009, with heavyweight vinyl editions released in November–December 2009.

== Commercial performance ==
Tour de France Soundtracks became the highest charting Kraftwerk album. It peaked at number one in Germany, becoming the band's first number one in their home country. However, it did not enter the Billboard 200, even though every Kraftwerk studio album since Ralf and Florian (1973) had charted there.

== Track listing ==
No.	Title	Lyrics	Music	Length
1.	"Prologue"		Ralf Hütter; Florian Schneider; Fritz Hilpert	0:31
2.	"Tour de France Étape 1" ("Tour de France Stage 1")	Hütter; Maxime Schmitt	Hütter; Schneider; Hilpert	4:27
3.	"Tour de France Étape 2" ("Tour de France Stage 2")	Hütter; Schmitt	Hütter; Schneider; Hilpert	6:41
4.	"Tour de France Étape 3" ("Tour de France Stage 3")	Hütter; Schmitt	Hütter; Schneider; Hilpert	3:56
5.	"Chrono"	Hütter; Schmitt	Hütter; Schneider; Hilpert	3:19
6.	"Vitamin"	Hütter	Hütter; Schneider; Hilpert	8:09
7.	"Aéro Dynamik" ("Aerodynamic")	Hütter; Schmitt	Hütter; Hilpert	5:04
8.	"Titanium"	Hütter; Schmitt	Hütter; Hilpert	3:21
9.	"Elektro Kardiogramm" ("Electrocardiogram")	Hütter	Hütter; Hilpert	5:16
10.	"La Forme" ("The Form")	Hütter; Schmitt	Hütter	8:41
11.	"Régéneration"	Hütter; Schmitt	Hütter	1:16
12.	"Tour de France"	Hütter; Schmitt	Hütter; Schneider; Karl Bartos	5:12
Total length:				55:57

Promotional version
No.	Title	Length
4.	"Tour de France Étape 3"	4:07
5.	"Chrono"	3:27
11.	"Régéneration"	2:05

=== Notes ===
- The 2003 Japanese CD release also contains the video of the single "Tour de France 2003" as enhanced content.
- The promotional version of Tour de France Soundtracks is slightly different from the album as it was finally released. "Régéneration" is longer at 2:05 in length, and there are slight differences in timbre and modulation during "Tour de France Étape 3", "Chrono", "La Forme" and "Régéneration".

== Personnel ==
- Ralf Hütter – vocals, software synthesizers, sequencing
- Henning Schmitz – software synthesizers, electronic percussion
- Fritz Hilpert – software synthesizers, electronic percussion, sound engineer
- Florian Schneider – additional vocals, software synthesizers, sequencing

== Charts ==
Chart (2003)	Peak position
Australian Albums (ARIA)	110
Austrian Albums (Ö3 Austria)	29
Danish Albums (Hitlisten)	9
Dutch Albums (Album Top 100)	76
Finnish Albums (Suomen virallinen lista)	7
French Albums (SNEP)	84
German Albums (Offizielle Top 100)	1
Italian Albums (FIMI)	22
Norwegian Albums (VG-lista)	18
Scottish Albums (OCC)	25
Swedish Albums (Sverigetopplistan)	7
Swiss Albums (Schweizer Hitparade)	25
UK Albums (OCC)	21
US Top Dance Albums (Billboard)	3

== Certifications ==
Region	Certification	Certified units/sales
United Kingdom (BPI)	Silver	60,000^{‡}
^{‡} Sales+streaming figures based on certification alone.
