= The Mix (Kraftwerk album) =

Studio album by Kraftwerk
- Released: 10 June 1991
- Recorded: April 1991
- Studio: Kling Klang (Düsseldorf)
- Genre: Synth-pop; techno; dance-pop
- Length: 65:15
- Label: Kling Klang; EMI; Elektra
- Producer: Ralf Hütter; Florian Schneider

Kraftwerk chronology
Electric Café (1986)	The Mix (1991)	Klang Box (1997)

Alternative cover
- 2009 remastered edition

The Mix is the tenth studio album by the German electronic music band Kraftwerk. It was released on 10 June 1991 by Kling Klang and EMI in Europe and by Elektra Records in North America. It features entirely re-arranged and re-recorded versions of a selection of songs which had originally appeared on Kraftwerk's albums Autobahn (1974) through Electric Café (1986). Some of the songs, such as "The Robots" and "Radioactivity", feature new additional melodies and/or lyrics.

== Background ==
In 1990, Kraftwerk had made a return to the stage, following a nine-year hiatus from touring. Ralf Hütter stated in interviews that he regarded The Mix as a type of "live" album, as it captured the results of the band's continual digital improvisations in their Kling Klang Studio. The versions of songs on The Mix subsequently became staples of the band's live set.

Karl Bartos stated in a 1998 interview with Sound on Sound that the original idea for The Mix was to release a "best of" compilation, a suggestion from Bob Krasnow at the band's U.S. record label, Elektra Records. Bartos elaborated that the idea "didn't really appeal to [Ralf], so he came up with the idea of making a remix record. He was really thinking ahead, but I think if you made the original record, you shouldn't do the remix yourself. Somebody else should have done it." In a 1991 interview with Melody Maker, Hütter said that "Kraftwerk is always a work-in-progress. We have no five-year plan. It's all about what's happening in the music, the zeitfenster at the time. So our Mix album is about these times, the remixing, cutting up and regeneration of old tracks." During this period, the band was converting their Kling Klang studio to digital, transferring its sound library from 24-track analogue tape to disc, which factored into the album's creation. This conversion project proved to be an ongoing task, as new upgrades and equipment were continually made available in the years following the album project.

Bartos stated that he was responsible for "all of the programming" on the record but went uncredited. The prolonged production period for the album led band members Wolfgang Flür and, later, Bartos to leave the group before its release. They were replaced by Fritz Hilpert and Fernando Abrantes.

== Reception ==
Professional ratings
Review scores
Source	Rating
AllMusic	3/5 stars
Almost Cool	9/10
Robert Christgau	(3-star Honorable Mention)
Drowned in Sound	5/10
The Guardian	4/4 stars
Mojo	3/5 stars
Music & Media	(favorable)
Q	4/5 stars
Select	5/5 stars
Uncut	4/5 stars

The Village Voice's Robert Christgau praised the album at the time, calling it a "best-of with the bass boosted".

In retrospective reviews, AllMusic's Alex Henderson observed that "Dance clubs had long been a key part of Kraftwerk's following, and the dance club was the obvious target of The Mix – a collection of highly enjoyable, often clever remixes", adding that it was a "welcome addition to the Kraftwerk catalog". Tom Ewing of Pitchfork cited the new versions of "Autobahn" and "Radioactivity" as highlights, adding that, "unlike most mix albums of the period this one had a purpose: these more physical and propulsive versions have fed into Kraftwerk's live set ever since". David Kavanagh of Uncut called it "a surprisingly addictive re-imagining of 11 classic tracks in a dancefloor context". While Andrew Harrison of Select awarded the album five stars out of five, his opinion was that "Hütter and Schneider threw themselves into techno as if they'd invented it (which they had), but updating Kraftwerk was always rather pointless, as their music has never dated at all". Chris Power of Drowned in Sound called it the band's "most idiosyncratic release", observing, "At its lowest ebb, crushingly, The Mix deals in an excruciating neutering of its source material ... its other sins being ones of redundancy rather than active damage." However, he singled out elements of "Autobahn" as what the album "could have been if Kraftwerk had elected to really work these tracks over in a radical way, rather than essentially updating them to dance music's early-Nineties industry standard".

The Mix was placed first in The Wire's year-end poll for 1991, the first time that the magazine — previously known for its focus on jazz — had an all-genre category.

== Re-release ==
A newly remastered edition of the album was released by EMI Records, Mute Records and Astralwerks Records on CD, digital download and heavyweight vinyl in October–November 2009. Because of licensing restrictions imposed by Warner Music Group, this version has only been made available in the US and Canada as a part of The Catalogue box set.

== Track listing ==
No.	Title	Writer(s)	Length
1.	"The Robots" ("Die Roboter")	Ralf Hütter; Florian Schneider; Karl Bartos	8:56
2.	"Computer Love" ("Computerliebe")	Hütter; Bartos; Emil Schult	6:35
3.	"Pocket Calculator" ("Taschenrechner")	Hütter; Bartos; Schult	4:32
4.	"Dentaku" (Japanese: "Calculator")	Hütter; Bartos; Schult	3:27
5.	"Autobahn"	Hütter; Schneider; Schult	9:27
6.	"Radioactivity" ("Radioaktivität")	Hütter; Schneider; Schult	6:53
7.	"Trans-Europe Express" ("Trans Europa Express")	Hütter; Schult	3:20
8.	"Abzug"	Hütter	2:18
9.	"Metal on Metal" ("Metall auf Metall")	Hütter	4:58
10.	"Home Computer" ("Heimcomputer")	Hütter; Schneider; Bartos	8:02
11.	"Music Non Stop" ("Musik Non-Stop")	Hütter; Schneider; Bartos	6:38
Total length:			65:15

- "Home Computer" also includes elements from "It's More Fun to Compute"
- "Music Non Stop" also includes elements from "Boing Boom Tschak" and "Techno Pop"

== Personnel ==
The original 1991 liner notes credit Hütter, Schneider and Hilpert simply with "Music Data Mix", while the 2009 remaster release gives more detailed credits for Hütter and Schneider. Abrantes, while uncredited in the liner notes, appeared in the artwork and other promotional material. Several other individuals are credited with "hardware" and "software", by last name only.

The 2009 remaster credits provide the following information:

Kraftwerk

- Ralf Hütter – voice, vocoder, Synclavier
- Florian Schneider – vocoder, speech synthesis
- Fritz Hilpert – music data mix

Additional musician

- Karl Bartos – programming

Technical

- Ralf Hütter – album concept, production, original artwork reconstruction
- Florian Schneider – album concept, production
- Günter Frohling – black and white photography
- Peter Boettcher – color photography
- Johann Zambryski – original artwork reconstruction

== Charts ==
=== Weekly charts ===
Chart (1991)	Peak position
Australian Albums (ARIA Charts)	132
Austrian Albums (Ö3 Austria)	12
Dutch Albums (Album Top 100)	83
German Albums (Offizielle Top 100)	7
Hungarian Albums (MAHASZ)	33
Swedish Albums (Sverigetopplistan)	20
Swiss Albums (Schweizer Hitparade)	27
UK Albums (OCC)	15
Chart (2020)	Peak position
Scottish Albums (OCC)	63

== Certifications ==
Region	Certification	Certified units/sales
United Kingdom (BPI)	Silver	60,000^{^}
^{^} Shipments figures based on certification alone.
