= Congress Hall (Warsaw) =

Concert hall in Warsaw, Poland

Coordinates: 52.231581°N 21.005229°E

- Sala Kongresowa (Polish)
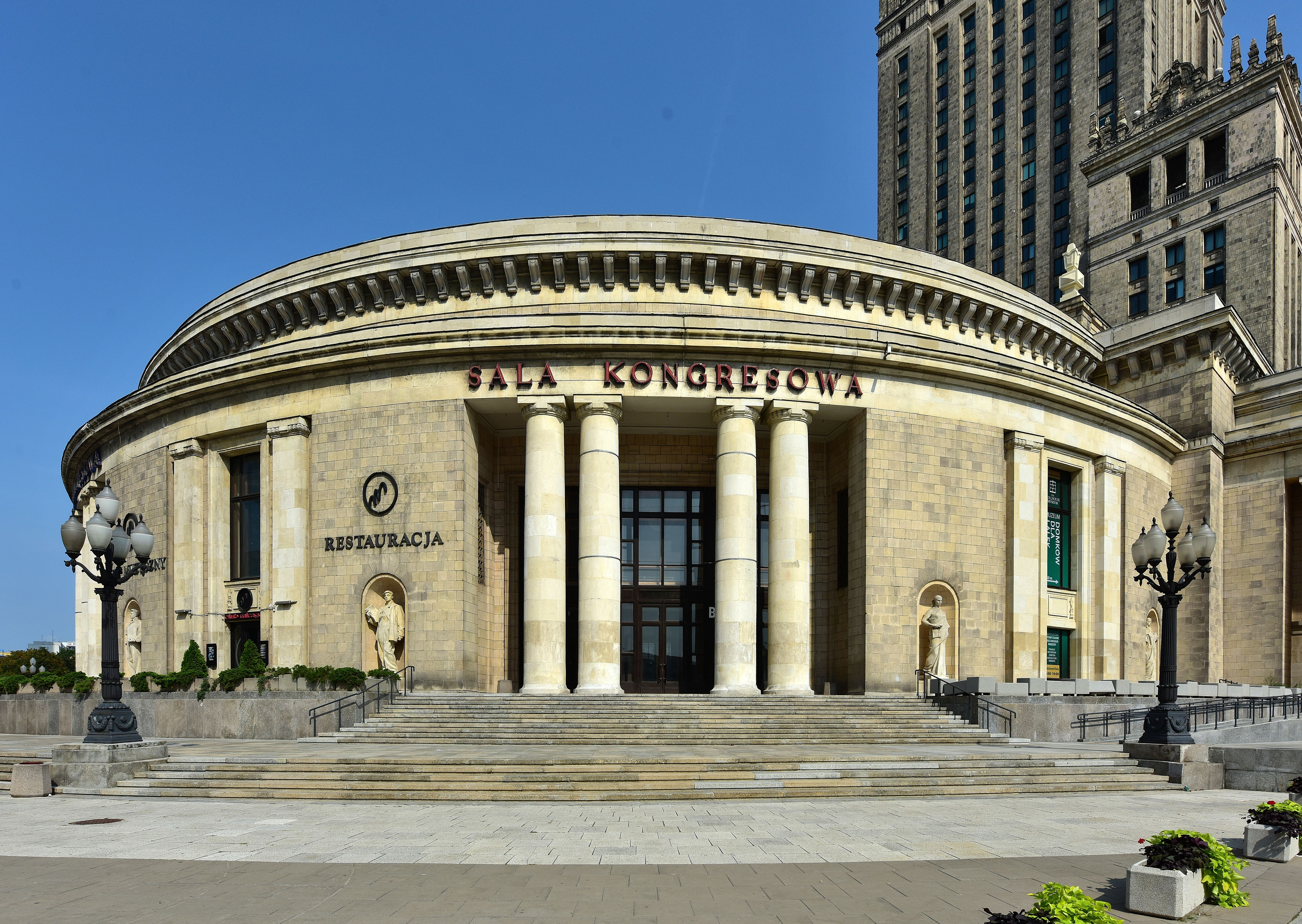
- Congress Hall from Emilii Plater St. (2018)
- Interactive map of the Congress Hall area

General information
- Type: Concert hall
- Architectural style: Socialist realism
- Location: pl. Defilad 1; 00-901 Warszawa, Poland
- Inaugurated: 21 July 1955; 70 years ago
- Renovated: since 2014

Other information
- Seating capacity: 2,880

Website
- pkin.pl

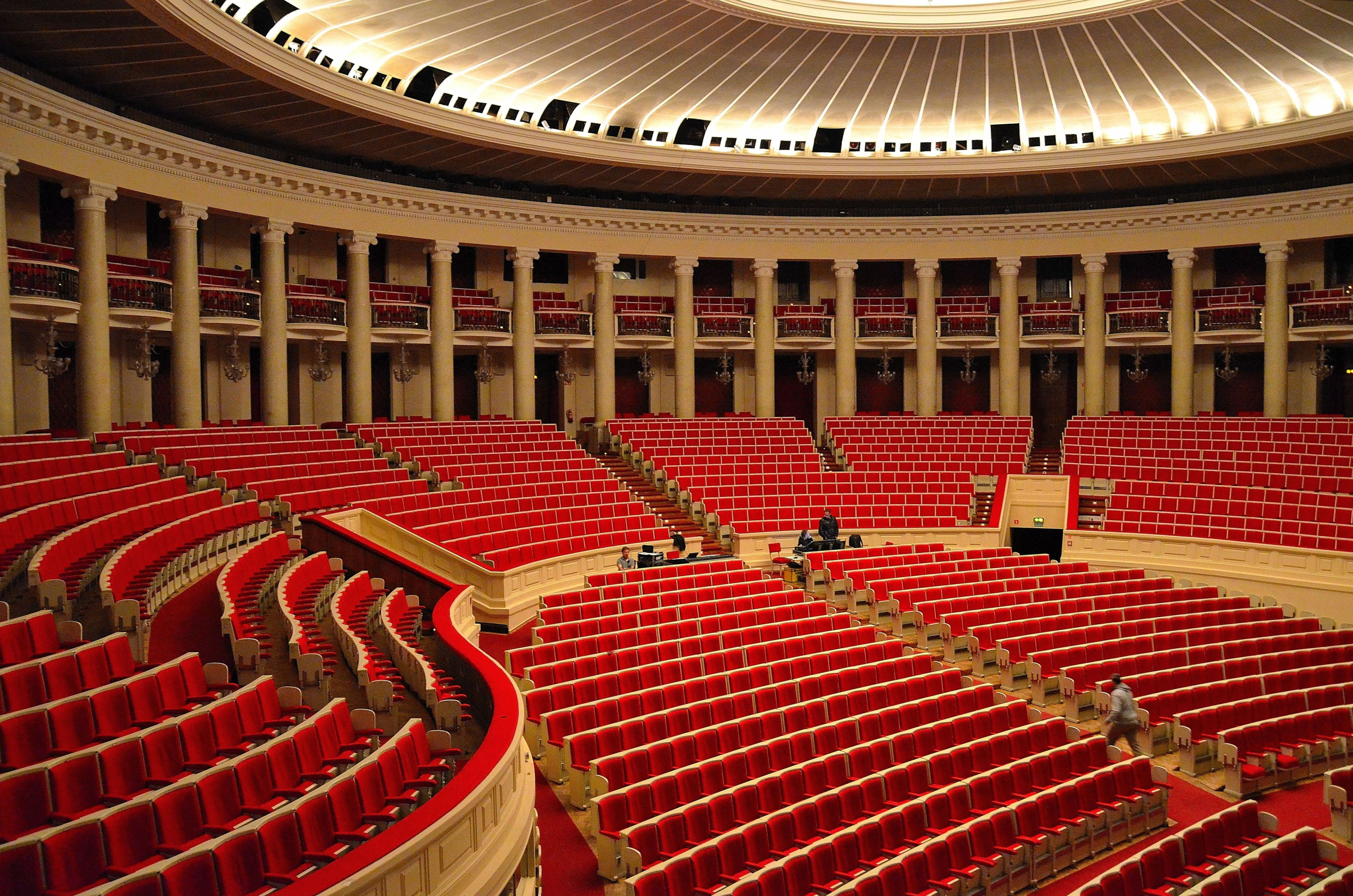
Interior of the Congress Hall (2011)

The Congress Hall (Polish: Sala Kongresowa) is a 2,880-seat theatre at the Palace of Culture and Science in Warsaw, Poland. It was opened in 1955.

== Renovation ==
The hall was closed in July 2014 for renovations, modernisation and improvements for fire safety. Originally the hall was to be closed for two years before re-opening in 2016. The initial cost estimate was 45 million złoty. The renovation of the building began in september of 2014, in order to adapt it to fire protection requirements. However, it turned out that the cost and scope of the work were underestimated, and in the spring of 2016 their contractor declared bankruptcy.In December 2017, the management board of the PKiN management company initiated a tender for a new concept aimed at modernizing the hall. The projected cost of the renovation exceeded PLN 100 million, with completion scheduled between 2022 and 2024. By August 2018, the Council of the Capital City of Warsaw had earmarked PLN 183 million specifically for the Congress Hall renovation, as part of its long-term financial planning. In 2019, the competition for the modernization of the hall was concluded. In 2021, it turned out that the amount reserved by the city was too small. The earliest completion date for the renovation is around 2025.

== Music performances and festivals ==
Past performances have included shows by Marlene Dietrich (1964 and 1966), King Crimson, Procol Harum, Pat Metheny, The Rolling Stones (1967), Paul Anka, Charles Aznavour, Juliette Gréco, Lou Reed, Keith Jarrett, Joe Cocker, Leonard Cohen (1985), Diana Krall, and Yes. More recent musical performances have included Tangerine Dream (in 1997), Patti Smith (in 2002), Kraftwerk (in 2004), Dead Can Dance (2005), Mieskuoro Huutajat (2007) and Katie Melua (2014).

The theatre has hosted closed-congresses of companies such as Microsoft, Nationale Nederlanden, Commercial Union, and Zepter International. In 2006, the theatre hosted the finals of the Miss World 2006 beauty pageant.

== See also ==
- History of Poland (1945-1989)
- Socialist realism
- Music of Poland

Preceded by Crown of Beauty Theatre (China) Sanya	Miss World venue 2006	Succeeded by Crown of Beauty Theatre (China) Sanya
