= Radioactivity (song) =

1976 single by Kraftwerk

Single by Kraftwerk

from the album Radio-Activity
- B-side: "Antenna"
- Released: 14 February 1976 (UK)
- Recorded: 1975, Kling Klang Studio
- Genre: Synth-pop; electronic
- Length: 3:18 (radio edit); 6:42 (album version)
- Label: Kling Klang; EMI Electrola; Capitol
- Songwriters: Ralf Hütter; Florian Schneider; Emil Schult
- Producers: Ralf Hütter; Florian Schneider

Kraftwerk singles chronology
"Autobahn" (1975)	"Radioactivity" (1976)	"Trans-Europe Express" (1977)

"Radioactivity" (German: "Radioaktivität") is a song by the German electronic music band Kraftwerk. It was released in February 1976 as the only single from their fifth studio album, Radio-Activity (1975).

The song was a commercial success in France and Belgium, but failed to chart in other countries, and thus was not as successful as Kraftwerk's previous hit "Autobahn".

== Composition ==
"Radioactivity"
A 22-second sample of the original recording of "Radioactivity" featuring the Morse code signal and one iteration of the main theme of the song.

The original recording features a Minimoog bass line playing eighth notes. Morse code signals spelling out radioactivity are also present, near the beginning of the track and again near the end. The second time the message continues with is in the air for you and me. The third iteration is "discovered by Madame Curie", followed by a fourth Morse iteration (distorted pitch) with the words "Radioactivity tune into the". The Morse iterations reflect the English lyrics, reprised after the part in German. A final Morse code iteration is "Kraftwerk", signing-off the song.

The song was re-recorded as a radically different version for The Mix album in 1991 and was issued as a single in an edited form with remixes by François Kevorkian and William Orbit. The 1991 version drops all references to radio and incorporates additional lyrics with a pointed anti-nuclear theme, remaking the central lyrical hook as “stop radioactivity” and also referring to “contaminated population” and mentioning by name Chernobyl, Harrisburg, Sellafield and Hiroshima.

== Live performances ==
"Radioactivity" has remained a regular part of Kraftwerk's live sets over the years. On its original performances in 1976, the band tried out an experimental light-beam operated "percussion cage", during which Wolfgang Flür attempted to trigger electronic drum sounds by interrupting light beams using arm gestures. This system frequently failed.

The band performed the Mix version at the "Stop Sellafield" concert in 1992. The song was performed during majority of live performances since 1991. Live versions of "Radioactivity" feature on both English and German versions of the band's 2005 live album Minimum-Maximum.

That live version played between 2002 and 2011, that mixed 1975 and 1991 versions, included the Sellafield 2 intro (they've used it since 1997, until 2011), where Florian says through a vocoder:

"Sellafield 2 will produce 7.5 tons of plutonium every year. 1.5 kilograms of plutonium make a nuclear bomb. Sellafield 2 will release the same amount of radioactivity into the environment as Chernobyl every 4.5 years. One of these radioactive substances, krypton-85, will cause death and skin cancer".

In 2012, Kraftwerk performed the new remix of "Radioactivity" during No Nukes 2012, held in Japan. To commemorate the Fukushima Daiichi nuclear disaster, Hütter sang alternate lyrics to the song in Japanese. The new lyrics were translated into Japanese language by Ryuichi Sakamoto, and make direct reference to Fukushima. This version of the song also has notable lyric changes such as "Chernobyl, Harrisburg, Sellafield, Fukushima," as well as calls for the end of Japan's use of nuclear technology. This altered version of the song is also the version Kraftwerk performs live to this day, albeit with the second chorus switching back to the English or German lyrics sung on the Mix version, depending on where they perform. This version also appears on the band's 2017 live album 3-D The Catalogue.

== Reception ==
"Radioactivity" is widely regarded as one of Kraftwerk's best songs. In 2020, Billboard and The Guardian ranked the song number five and number two, respectively, on their lists of the greatest Kraftwerk songs.

The song influenced Orchestral Manoeuvres in the Dark's song "Electricity". Andy McCluskey of OMD describes "Electricity" as "a faster, punkier version of 'Radioactivity' with a chorus".

== Appearances in other media ==
The song appeared in Rainer Werner Fassbinder's films Chinese Roulette and Berlin Alexanderplatz, and the 2010 documentary Into Eternity.

The song, as did other songs from Radio-Activity, appeared in the Brazilian telenovela Saramandaia.

The song appeared in the season finale of American Horror Story season 11, as part of a death montage.

== Track listing ==
All tracks are written by Ralf Hütter, Florian Schneider and Emil Schult.

No.	Title	Length
1.	"Radioactivity" ("Radioaktivität")	3:18
2.	"Antenna" ("Antenne")	3:03

== Charts ==
Chart (1976)	Peak position
Belgium (Ultratop 50 Flanders)	21
Belgium (Ultratop 50 Wallonia)	8
France (SNEP)	3

== Certifications and sales ==
Region	Certification	Certified units/sales
France (SNEP)	Gold	500,000^{*}
^{*} Sales figures based on certification alone.

== 1991 re-issue ==
"Radioactivity"

Single by Kraftwerk

from the album The Mix
- Released: October 1991
- Genre: Synth-pop
- Length: 6:53
- Label: Kling Klang; EMI; Electrola
- Songwriters: Ralf Hütter; Florian Schneider; Emil Schult
- Producers: Ralf Hütter; Florian Schneider

Kraftwerk singles chronology
"The Robots" (1991)	"Radioactivity" (1991)	"Expo 2000" (1999)

"Radioactivity" was re-issued 1991 as a single from Kraftwerk's remix album The Mix, featuring remixes by François Kevorkian and William Orbit. The song's new lyrics turn it into an anti-nuclear protest song, with references to the Hiroshima bombing, Three Mile Island (Harrisburg), Chernobyl, and Sellafield.

== Track listing ==
=== 7-inch single ===
Side one
No.	Title	Length
1.	"Radioactivity (François Kevorkian 7" Remix)"	4:08

Side two
No.	Title	Length
2.	"Radioactivity (William Orbit 7" Remix)"	3:49

=== 12-inch single ===
Side one
No.	Title	Length
1.	"Radioactivity (François Kevorkian Remix)"	7:26
2.	"Radioactivity (LP Version)"	6:53

Side two
No.	Title	Length
3.	"Radioactivity (William Orbit Hardcore Mix)"	6:13
4.	"Radioactivity (William Orbit Remix)"	7:23

=== CD single ===
No.	Title	Length
1.	"Radioactivity (François Kevorkian 7" Remix)"	4:10
2.	"Radioactivity (François Kevorkian 12" Remix)"	7:26
3.	"Radioactivity (William Orbit 12" Remix)"	7:24

=== Cassette single ===
Side one
No.	Title	Length
1.	"Radioactivity (François Kevorkian 7" Remix)"
2.	"Radioactivity (William Orbit 7" Remix)"

Side two
No.	Title	Length
3.	"Radioactivity (François Kevorkian 7" Remix)"
4.	"Radioactivity (William Orbit 7" Remix)"

== Charts ==
Chart (1991)	Peak position
Finland (Suomen virallinen lista)	8
UK Singles (Official Charts)	43
UK Dance (Music Week)	39
US Dance Club Songs (Billboard)	21

== Fatboy Slim version ==
"Radioactivity"

Single by Fatboy Slim

from the album Late Night Tales: Fatboy Slim
- B-side: "Everything Is Everything"
- Released: October 8, 2007
- Length: 3:37
- Label: LateNightTales
- Songwriters: Ralf Hütter; Florian Schneider; Emil Schult
- Producers: Norman Cook; Simon Thornton

Fatboy Slim singles chronology
"Champion Sound" (2006)	"Radioactivity" (2007)	"Please Don't" (2010)

Fatboy Slim covered "Radioactivity" for the closing track of his compilation album Late Night Tales: Fatboy Slim. It featured vocals contributed by a woman from his favorite record store. The song was released as a limited edition 7-inch single.

== Track listing ==
=== 7-inch single ===
Side one
No.	Title	Writer(s)	Length
1.	"Radioactivity"	Hütter, Schneider, Schult	3:37

Side two
No.	Title	Writer(s)	Length
2.	"Everything Is Everything"	Bootsy Collins	3:43
