= Aerodynamik =

Song by Kraftwerk

Single by Kraftwerk

from the album Tour de France Soundtracks
- Released: 15 March 2004
- Studio: Kling Klang, Düsseldorf, Germany
- Genre: Minimal techno; synth-pop
- Length: 3:45
- Label: Kling Klang; EMI; Astralwerks
- Songwriters: Ralf Hütter; Florian Schneider; Fritz Hilpert; Henning Schmitz
- Producers: Ralf Hütter; Florian Schneider; Fritz Hilpert; Henning Schmitz

Kraftwerk singles chronology
"Elektro Kardiogramm" (2003)	"Aerodynamik" (2004)	"AeroDynamik / La Forme Remixes" (2007)

"Aerodynamik" is a song by the German electronic music band Kraftwerk. It was released on 15 March 2004 as the fourth single from their tenth studio album, Tour de France Soundtracks (2003). The song peaked at number-one on the UK dance singles chart.

== Track listings ==
=== CD ===
No.	Title	Length
1.	"Aerodynamik (Kling Klang Radio Mix)"	3:45
2.	"Aerodynamik (Kling Klang Dynamix)"	6:48
3.	"Aerodynamik (Alex Gopher / Etienne de Crecy Dynamik Mix)"	7:42
4.	"Aerodynamik (François K Aero Mix)"	7:52

=== 12" ===
Side one
No.	Title	Length
1.	"Aerodynamik (Kling Klang Dynamix)"	7:01
2.	"Aerodynamik (Alex Gopher/Etienne De Crecy Dynamik Mix)"	7:42

Side two
No.	Title	Length
3.	"Aerodynamik (François K Aero Mix)"	7:52

== Charts ==
=== Weekly charts ===
Chart (2004)	Peak position
France (SNEP)	95
Germany (GfK)	80
Hungary (Single Top 40)	7
Italy (FIMI)	30
Scotland Singles (OCC)	29
Sweden (Sverigetopplistan)	56
UK Singles (OCC)	33
UK Dance (OCC)	1
US Hot Dance/Electronic Songs (Billboard)	20

== Aerodynamik / La Forme Remixes ==
"Aerodynamik / La Forme Remixes"

Single by Kraftwerk

from the album Tour de France Soundtracks
- Released: 17 September 2007
- Studio: Kling Klang Studio
- Genre: Electronic; synthpop; techno
- Length: 8:31 (Aerodynamik); 11:32 (La Forme)
- Label: EMI
- Songwriters: Ralf Hütter; Florian Schneider; Fritz Hilpert; Henning Schmitz
- Producers: Ralf Hütter; Florian Schneider; Fritz Hilpert; Henning Schmitz; Alexis Taylor; Joe Goddard

Kraftwerk singles chronology
"Aerodynamik" (2004)	"Aerodynamik / La Forme Remixes" (2007)

"Aerodynamik / La Forme Remixes" (also known as: "Aerodynamik + La Forme Remixes") is a remix single recorded by Kraftwerk and British band Hot Chip. The single was released on 17 September 2007 and includes remixes of two songs from Kraftwerk's 2003 studio album Tour de France Soundtracks. Both songs were remixed by Hot Chip as extended arrangements. The single debuted at #78 on the UK Singles Chart.

== Track listings ==
All tracks are written by Kraftwerk and remixed by Hot Chip.

No.	Title	Length
1.	"Aerodynamik (Intelligent Design Mix)"	8:31
2.	"La Forme (King of the Mountains Mix)"	11:32

== Charts ==
Chart (2007)	Peak position
Danish Singles Chart	13
German Singles Chart	79
Spanish Singles Chart	2
UK Singles Chart	78
