= Radio-Activity =

Studio album by Kraftwerk
- Released: November 1975
- Studio: Kling Klang (Düsseldorf)
- Genres: Electronic; experimental pop; ambient pop; avant-garde
- Length: 37:38
- Labels: Kling Klang; EMI; Capitol
- Producers: Ralf Hütter; Florian Schneider

Kraftwerk chronology
Exceller 8 (1974)	Radio-Activity (1975)	Trans-Europe Express (1977)

Alternative cover
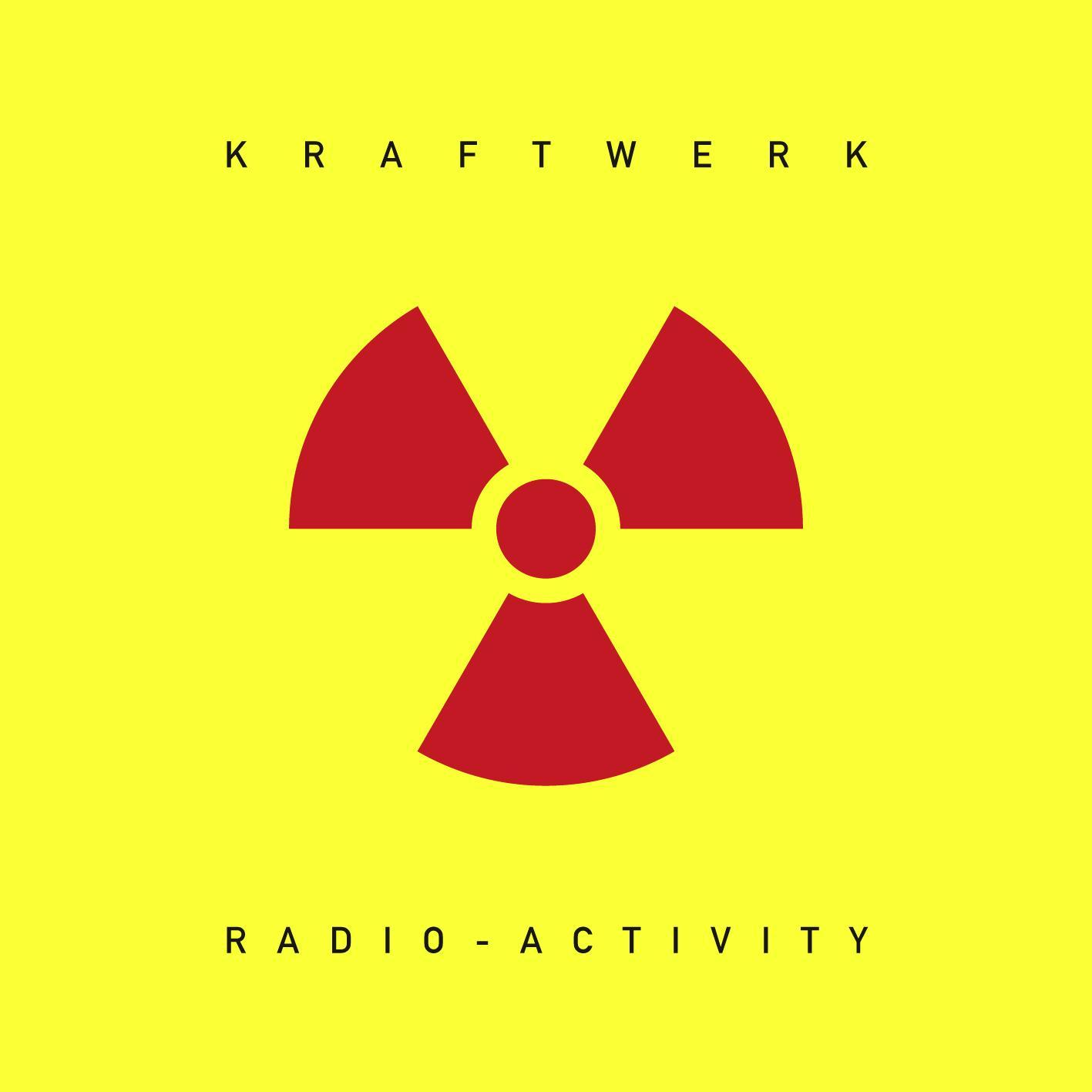
- 2009 remastered edition

Singles from Radio-Activity
- 1. "Radioactivity" Released: 14 February 1976

Radio-Activity (German title: Radio-Aktivität) is the fifth studio album by German electronic music band Kraftwerk, released in November 1975. The band's first entirely electronic album is also a concept album organized around the themes of radioactive decay and radio communication. Although the sleeves vary in language, sometimes with English song titles, and sometimes German, the music is always the same, with some lyrics in English and some in German. This is in contrast to the band's later albums, where the lyrics would be rerecorded in each language. The album was accompanied by single release of the title track, which was successful in France and Belgium.

== Background ==
Following the success of its 1974 predecessor Autobahn, an album based on Germany's eponymous motorway network, Kraftwerk embarked on a tour of the United States with the "classic" lineup of the band formed by Ralf Hütter, Florian Schneider, Karl Bartos—who joined in February 1975—and Wolfgang Flür in April and May 1975.

== Album title and cover art ==
Radio-Activity's album title displays Kraftwerk's typical deadpan humour, being a pun on the twin themes of the songs, half being about radioactivity and the other half about activity on the radio. Bartos revealed that the title was inspired by a chart column in the American magazine, Billboard, which featured the most played singles under the title "Radio Activity". According to Wolfgang Flur, the concept arose as a result of the many radio interviews that Ralf and Florian had given on their American tour.

The album's cover depicts a Volksempfänger radio which was produced in Germany during the Third Reich regime.

== Composition and recording ==
The album was recorded in Kling Klang Studio, Düsseldorf, and it was self-produced by Hütter and Schneider. It was their first purely electronic album, and the first one to be performed by the "classic" band line-up. Bartos and Flür worked on electronic percussion. LP liner notes state music and production was by Hütter and Schneider, with Emil Schult collaborating on lyrics. For this album, the band had decided to record some vocals in English and Schult's command of the language after studying for a while in the United States was better than Hutter's or Schneider's. Tim Barr pointed out the impact his experiences had in the United States on his ability to speak the language and in more subtle ways as well. Schult also designed the artwork, which was based on a late-1930s 'Deutscher Kleinempfänger' radio.

The overture instrumental piece "Geiger Counter" used Geiger counter beats based on musique concrète. The album featured use of the distinctive Vako Orchestron keyboard to provide vocal choir on the title track, and for the lead melody of the closing track "Ohm Sweet Ohm". "Antenna" used an echo chamber effect, and Hütter's Farfisa electronic piano was used on "Transistor". For the album's recording, extensive use was made of the vocoder.

In 2009, Hütter stated that during the production of the album, the neighbours surrounding Kling Klang Studio suspected that Kraftwerk were housing firearms. This reportedly led to armed police officers entering the studio, demanding the location of the "weapons", with Hütter speculating their reasoning could have potentially been "...because of the noise".

== Release and promotion ==
In September 1975, the band toured the UK, playing 17 shows. By 1975, Hütter and Schneider's previous publishing deals with Capriccio Music and Star Musik Studio of Hamburg had expired. The compositions on Radio-Activity were published by their own newly set up Kling Klang Verlag music publishing company, giving them greater financial control over the use of songwriting output. The album was also the first to bear the fruit of Kling Klang as an established vanity label under the group's new licensing deal with EMI.

Radio-Activity was released in November 1975. For their promotion, their record company sent them to a "real Atomkraftwerk" to take promotional photos. In these photos, the group was dressed in white protective suits and anti-radiation boots on their shoes. The album reached No. 59 on the Canadian charts in February 1976. The title track "Radioactivity" was released as a single in May 1976 and became a #3 hit in France, selling 500,000 copies, and also charted in Belgium.

== Reception ==
Professional ratings
Review scores
Source	Rating
AllMusic	4/5 stars
Drowned in Sound	8/10
The Guardian	3/4 stars
The Irish Times	4/5 stars
Mojo	4/5 stars
Q	4/5 stars
The Rolling Stone Album Guide	2/5 stars
Select	4/5
Spin Alternative Record Guide	9/10
Uncut	4/5 stars

Radio-Activity was released to mixed reviews, with Rolling Stone criticizing the album: "... no cut on the album comes near the melodic/harmonic sense that pervaded Autobahn or the creative use of electronics on the much earlier album Ralf and Florian". Uncut wrote regarding their 2009 remaster that it "begins like a heartbeat in the void, accelerating into the pulse that will form the spine of the title-song, an eerie tribute to the intangibles (music, disintegrating atoms) that linger in the atmosphere." The review considers that it "has a musty scent of Old Europe, which proved a hit with the synth groups of 1980-81 (e.g., Ultravox and Visage), and it retains a blood-chilling, Wagnerian quality even now, thanks to Kraftwerk's use of the Vako Orchestron, a choir-like relative of the Mellotron."

Chris Power from Drowned in Sound praised it for the experimental feeling in 2009: "A bridge between electronic experimentalism and the powerful, groundbreaking unification of avant-garde form and catchy, commercial function that was just around the corner, Radio-Activity is the sound of Kraftwerk finding their way in a strange new landscape that they were in the very process of creating". In a retrospective review, Jason Ankeny from AllMusic called the album "a pivotal record in the group's continuing development" and stated that it "marked Kraftwerk's return to more obtuse territory, extensively utilizing static, oscillators, and even Cage-like moments of silence".

== Track listing ==
Side one
No.	Title	Writer(s)	Length
1.	"Geiger Counter" ("Geigerzähler")	Ralf Hütter; Florian Schneider	1:07
2.	"Radioactivity" ("Radioaktivität")	Hütter; Schneider; Emil Schult	6:42
3.	"Radioland"	Hütter; Schneider; Schult	5:50
4.	"Airwaves" ("Ätherwellen")	Hütter; Schneider; Schult	4:40
5.	"Intermission" ("Sendepause")	Hütter; Schneider	0:39
6.	"News" ("Nachrichten")	Hütter; Schneider	1:17

Side two
No.	Title	Writer(s)	Length
7.	"The Voice of Energy" ("Die Stimme der Energie")	Hütter; Schneider; Schult	0:55
8.	"Antenna" ("Antenne")	Hütter; Schneider; Schult	3:43
9.	"Radio Stars" ("Radio Sterne")	Hütter; Schneider; Schult	3:35
10.	"Uranium" ("Uran")	Hütter; Schneider; Schult	1:26
11.	"Transistor"	Hütter; Schneider	2:15
12.	"Ohm Sweet Ohm"	Hütter; Schneider	5:39
Total length:			37:38

== Personnel ==
Adapted from 2009 remaster liner notes.

=== Kraftwerk ===
- Ralf Hütter – vocals, synthesizers, Orchestron, electronic piano, drum machine, electronics
- Florian Schneider – vocals, vocoder, votrax, synthesizers, electronics
- Karl Bartos – electronic percussion
- Wolfgang Flür – electronic percussion

=== Additional personnel ===
- Peter Bollig – technical engineer (Kling Klang Studio, Düsseldorf)
- Walter Quintus – sound mix engineer (Rüssl Studio, Hamburg)
- Robert Franke – photography
- Emil Schult – artwork
- Johann Zambryski – artwork reconstruction (2009 Remaster)

== Charts ==
=== Weekly charts ===
Chart (1976)	Peak position
Australia (Kent Music Report)	94
Austrian Albums (Ö3 Austria)	4
Canada (RPM)	59
France (SNEP)	1
German Albums (Offizielle Top 100)	22
US Billboard 200	140
Chart (2020)	Peak position
Scottish Albums (Official Charts)	64
Chart (2026)	Peak position
Croatian International Albums (HDU)	8
Hungarian Albums (MAHASZ)	23

=== Certifications and sales ===
Region	Certification	Certified units/sales
France (SNEP)	Gold	100,000^{*}
United Kingdom (BPI)	Silver	60,000^{‡}
^{*} Sales figures based on certification alone.

== Bibliography ==
- Stubbs, David (5 August 2014). Future Days: Krautrock and the Building of Modern Germany. Faber & Faber. ISBN 978-0-571-28334-7.
- Albiez, Sean; Pattie, David (1 January 2011). Kraftwerk: Music Non-Stop. A&C Black. ISBN 978-1-4411-9136-6.
- Barr, Tim (31 August 2013). Kraftwerk: from Dusseldorf to the Future With Love. Random House. ISBN 978-1-4481-7776-9.
