= Trans-Europe Express (song) =

Single by Kraftwerk

from the album Trans-Europe Express
- B-side: "Franz Schubert"; "Metal on Metal"
- Released: 22 April 1977
- Recorded: 1976
- Studio: Kling Klang (Düsseldorf, Germany)
- Genre: Electronic; synth-pop; electropop
- Length: 6:53 (album version); 3:56 (single version)
- Label: Kling Klang; EMI
- Songwriters: Ralf Hütter; Emil Schult
- Producers: Ralf Hütter; Florian Schneider

Kraftwerk singles chronology
"Radioactivity" (1976)	"Trans-Europe Express" (1977)	"Showroom Dummies" (1977)

"Trans-Europe Express" is a song by German electronic music band Kraftwerk, released in April 1977 by Kling Klang and EMI as the lead single from their studio album of the same name (1977). The long version of the song was on the original released album, is 13:44 long, and split into two (in the United States) or three parts (in West Germany). The music was written by Ralf Hütter and the lyrics by Hütter and Emil Schult. The track is about the Trans Europ Express rail system, with technology and transport both being common themes in Kraftwerk's oeuvre.

The track became popular in dance clubs in New York, and has since found further influence, both in hip-hop by its interpolation by Afrika Bambaata (via Arthur Baker) on "Planet Rock", which has been sampled and remixed by many different artists such as Paul Oakenfold for Swordfish's soundtrack, and by modern experimental bands such as the electroclash bands of the early 2000s. In 2021, it was ranked at No. 304 on Rolling Stone's "Top 500 Greatest Songs of All Time".

== Composition and lyrics ==
"Trans-Europe Express"
Kraftwerk's "Trans-Europe Express" from Trans-Europe Express

AllMusic described the musical elements of the suite as having a haunting theme with "deadpan chanting of the title phrase" which is "slowly layered over that rhythmic base in much the same way that the earlier "Autobahn" was constructed". The song's lyrics reference the album Station to Station and meeting with musicians Iggy Pop and David Bowie. Hütter and Schneider had previously met up with Bowie in Germany and were flattered with the attention they received from him. Ralf Hütter was interested in Bowie's work as he had been working with Iggy Pop, who was the former lead singer of the Stooges; one of Hütter's favorite groups.

== Release and critical reception ==
"Trans-Europe Express" was released as a single in April 1977, and charted on the US Billboard Hot 100, where it peaked at number 67, and also peaked at No. 96 on the Canadian charts and No. 10 on the German charts. It did not chart in the UK. In 2019, NME ranked "Trans-Europe Express" among "The 20 Best Disco Songs of All Time". In 2020, Billboard and The Guardian both named it as Kraftwerk's greatest song. In 2021 and 2022, it was ranked at No. 304 and 12 on Rolling Stone's "Top 500 Greatest Songs of All Time" and "200 Greatest Dance Songs of All Time" lists.

== Track listing ==
=== 7" vinyl ===
Side A
No.	Title	Length
1.	"Trans-Europe Express"	3:56

Side B
No.	Title	Length
1.	"Franz Schubert"	3:25

=== 12" vinyl ===
Side A
No.	Title	Length
1.	"Trans-Europe Express"	6:35

Side B
No.	Title	Length
1.	"Metal on Metal"	6:31

=== CD single ===
No.	Title	Length
1.	"Trans-Europe Express (album version)"	6:43
2.	"Trans-Europe Express (single version)"	3:55
3.	"Les Mannequins"	6:04
4.	"Showroom Dummies"	6:02

== Charts ==
Chart (1977–1978)	Peak position
Belgium (Ultratop 50 Flanders)	26
Canada Top Singles (RPM)	96
Sweden (Sverigetopplistan)	15
US Billboard Hot 100	67

== Bibliography ==
- Bussy, Pascal (2004). Kraftwerk: Man, Machine and Music. SAF Publishing Ltd. ISBN 0-946719-70-5.
- Strong, M. C. (1998). The Great Rock Discography. Giunti. ISBN 88-09-21522-2.
