= The Man-Machine =

1978 studio album by Kraftwerk

Studio album by Kraftwerk
- Released: 28 April 1978
- Recorded: 1977–1978
- Studio: Kling Klang (Düsseldorf)
- Genres: Synth-pop; electropop; new wave
- Length: 36:10
- Labels: Kling Klang; EMI Electrola
- Producers: Ralf Hütter; Florian Schneider

Kraftwerk chronology
Trans-Europe Express (1977)	The Man-Machine (1978)	Computer World (1981)

Alternative cover
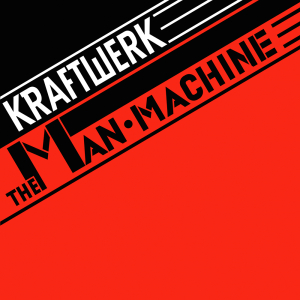
- 2009 remastered edition

Singles from The Man-Machine
- 1. "The Robots" Released: 12 May 1978; 2. "The Model" / "Neon Lights" Released: 22 September 1978

The Man-Machine (German: Die Mensch-Maschine) is the seventh studio album by German electronic music band Kraftwerk. It was released on 19 May 1978 by Kling Klang in Germany and by Capitol Records elsewhere. A further refinement of their mechanical style, the album saw the group incorporate more immediate songwriting and danceable rhythms, while also incorporating elements of political satire. It addresses a wide-range of themes from the Cold War, Germany's fascination with manufacturing, and humankind's increasingly symbiotic relationship with machines. It includes the singles "The Model" and "The Robots".

Although the album peaked at 53 initially on the UK Albums Chart, it reached a new peak position of number nine in February 1982, becoming the band's second highest-peaking album in the United Kingdom after Autobahn (1974).

== Music ==
Matt Mitchell of Paste magazine said that "the album was where Kraftwerk took their mechanical style of old and re-tuned it into a club-worthy aesthetic". The staff of GQ India assessed: "Taking electronic music from the German counterculture – a still influential moment termed Krautrock by UK audiences – across the 1970s and early '80s, [Kraftwerk] sculpted something modernist [...] out of the possibilities of synthesiser music." According to Alex Linhardt of Pitchfork, the band "just sound like robots" on the album. He explained: "While the fast-paced world of Ralf Hütter quotes knows no limits of pretension, this is the only album that conceivably expresses his ideal music: No emotions, no philosophies, no performances, and virtually no humor. It is pure technology: the whistles and surging circuitry of unmanned factories; twinkling hydraulic tubes; flaring odometers and cogs; and pre-Pong claw-claps." According to Steve Huey of AllMusic, "The Man-Machine is closer to the sound and style that would define early new wave electro-pop – less minimalistic in its arrangements and more complex and danceable in its underlying rhythms." He further described the style as "more pop-oriented than any of their previous work"

Themes explored on the album include science fiction and urbanization.

== Artwork ==
The artwork for the cover was produced by Karl Klefisch, based on the work of the Russian suprematist El Lissitzky – the words "Inspired by El Lissitzky" are noted in the album's inner sleeve. The back cover image is an adaptation of a graphic from Lissitzky's book for children About Two Squares: A Suprematist Tale of Two Squares in Six Constructions.

== Release ==
The Man-Machine was released in April 1978. The Man-Machine was certified gold by the British Phonographic Industry (BPI) on 15 February 1982 In October 2009, a remastered edition of the album was released on CD, Vinyl and digital formats by Mute Records, and Astralwerks.

== Critical reception and legacy ==
Professional ratings
Review scores
Source	Rating
AllMusic	4.5/5 stars
Christgau's Record Guide	B+
The Guardian	4/4 stars
The Irish Times	4/5 stars
Mojo	5/5 stars
Q	4/5 stars
The Rolling Stone Album Guide	4/5 stars
Select	5/5
Spin Alternative Record Guide	8/10
Uncut	4/5 stars

Reviewing the album in 1978, Andy Gill of NME stated that "The Man-Machine stands as one of the pinnacles of 70's rock music", adding that "the sparsity of the lyrics leaves the emphasis squarely on those robot rhythms, chilling tones and exquisite melodies". Village Voice critic Robert Christgau also reviewed the album that year, saying: "Only a curmudgeon could reject a group that synthesizes the innovations of Environments and David Seville & the Chipmunks, not to mention that it's better make-out music." Mitchell Schneider from Rolling Stone found that the "chilling restraint and relentless sameness" of the lyrics and music are tempered by Kraftwerk's sense of humour and "sheer audacity", which makes for a listening experience that is "strangely pleasant in an otherworldly way".

Tony Clayton wrote in The Irish Times which "they constitute the resilient framework of electro-pop and electronica we hear today. And if there are more simple, warm and beautiful pieces of electronic music out there than 'Ohm Sweet Ohm', 'Neon Lights', 'Europe Endless' and the title track of Autobahn, then this geezer has yet to hear them." Uncut critic David Cavanagh called "The Model" a "wry pop satire" and wrote that "the sparse lyrics lend themselves to considerable interpretation".

In a retrospective review for AllMusic, Steve Huey gave the album four-and-a-half-stars, noting: "More pop-oriented than any of their previous work, the sound of The Man-Machine – in particular among Kraftwerk's oeuvre – had a tremendous impact on the cold, robotic synth pop of artists like Gary Numan, as well as Britain's later new romantic movement." NME ranked The Man-Machine as the 57th greatest album of all time in 2013, citing it as Kraftwerk's "definitive" album and the catalyst for the synth-pop "revolution" that followed its release. Paste ranked it the 11th best album of 1978.

The staff of GQ India called the album's sound "new and brilliant" for its time. They wrote: "Though 1981's Computer World is arguably more prescient musically in its anticipation of techno, 1978's Man Machine is the masterpiece – elegiac, witty and truly marvellous in its sheer audacity and triumph. For our money, the best electronic album of all time."

In 2023, Matt Mitchell of Paste magazine stated that the album is "at its core, the godfather of synth-pop as we know it." He also said "the album is a beautiful example of early-era electro-pop architecture, and it laid the groundwork for what bands like Depeche Mode, OMD and Pet Shop Boys would aim to do in the decade that followed."

== Track listing ==
All lyrics are written by Ralf Hütter except "The Model", lyrics by Hütter and Emil Schult.

Side one
No.	Title	Music	Length
1.	"The Robots" ("Die Roboter")	Hütter; Florian Schneider; Karl Bartos	6:10
2.	"Spacelab"	Hütter; Bartos	5:50
3.	"Metropolis"	Hütter; Schneider; Bartos	6:01

Side two
No.	Title	Music	Length
4.	"The Model" ("Das Modell")	Hütter; Bartos	3:38
5.	"Neon Lights" ("Neonlicht")	Hütter; Schneider; Bartos	9:03
6.	"The Man-Machine" ("Die Mensch-Maschine")	Hütter; Bartos	5:28
Total length:			36:10

== Personnel ==
Credits adapted from the liner notes of the 2009 remastered edition of The Man-Machine.

=== Kraftwerk ===
- Ralf Hütter – album concept, artwork reconstruction (2009 remaster), cover, electronics, keyboards, Orchestron, production, Synthanorma Sequenzer, synthesiser, vocoder, voice
- Florian Schneider – album concept, electronics, production, synthesiser, vocoder, Votrax
- Karl Bartos – electronic drums
- Wolfgang Flür – electronic drums

=== Additional personnel ===
- Günther Fröhling – photography
- Leanard Jackson – engineering
- Karl Klefisch – artwork
- Joschko Rudas – engineering
- Henning Schmitz – engineering assistance
- Johann Zambryski – artwork reconstruction (2009 remaster)

== Studios ==
- Recorded at Kling Klang Studio in Düsseldorf, Germany
- Mixed at Studio Rudas in Düsseldorf, Germany

== Charts ==
=== Weekly charts ===
Chart (1978)	Peak position
Australian Albums (Kent Music Report)	56
Austrian Albums (Ö3 Austria)	15
Dutch Albums (Album Top 100)	29
French Albums (SNEP)	14
German Albums (Offizielle Top 100)	12
Swedish Albums (Sverigetopplistan)	24
US Billboard 200	130

Chart (1982)	Peak position
UK Albums (Official Charts)	9

Chart (2011)	Peak position
Italian Albums (FIMI)	94

=== Year-end charts ===
Chart (1978)	Position
German Albums (Offizielle Top 100)	26

== Certifications and sales ==
Region	Certification	Certified units/sales
Germany	—	150,000
United Kingdom (BPI)	Gold	100,000^{^}
^{^} Shipments figures based on certification alone.
