= Trans-Europe Express (album) =

- German album cover

Studio album by Kraftwerk
- Released: March 1977
- Recorded: 1976
- Studio: Kling Klang (Düsseldorf)
- Genres: Electropop; synth-pop; experimental pop; avant-garde
- Length: 42:45
- Label: Kling Klang
- Producers: Ralf Hütter; Florian Schneider

Kraftwerk chronology
Radio-Activity (1975)	Trans-Europe Express (1977)	The Man-Machine (1978)

Alternative cover
- Cover used on most international editions

Singles from Trans-Europe Express
- 1. "Trans-Europe Express" Released: 22 April 1977; 2. "Showroom Dummies" Released: 26 August 1977

Trans-Europe Express (German: Trans Europa Express) is the sixth studio album by German electronic band Kraftwerk. Recorded in 1976 in Düsseldorf, Germany, the album was released in March 1977 on Kling Klang Records. It saw the group refine their melodic electronic style, with a focus on sequenced rhythms, minimalism, and occasionally manipulated vocals. The themes include celebrations of the eponymous European railway service and Europe as a whole, and meditations on the disparities between reality and appearance.

Trans-Europe Express charted at 119 on the American charts and was ranked number 30 in The Village Voice's 1977 Pazz & Jop critics' poll. Two singles were released: "Trans-Europe Express" and "Showroom Dummies". The album has been re-released in several formats and continues to receive acclaim as one of the best albums of the 1970s and of all time. In 2014, the Los Angeles Times called it "the most important pop album of the last 40 years".

== Background ==
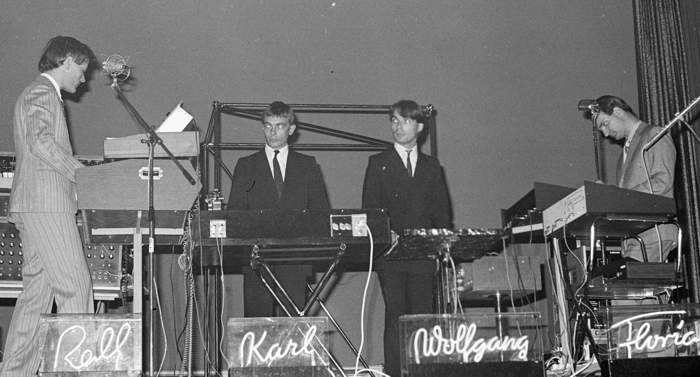
Kraftwerk performing in Zürich on 10 March 1976, before starting production on Trans-Europe Express

After the release and tour for the album Radio-Activity, Kraftwerk continued to move further away from their earlier krautrock style of improvised instrumental music, refining their work more into the format of melodic electronic songs. During the tour for Radio-Activity, the band began to make performance rules such as not to be drunk on stage or at parties. Karl Bartos wrote about these rules, stating that "it's not easy to turn knobs on a synthesizer if you are drunk or full of drugs. ... We always tried to keep very aware of what we were doing while acting in public." During this tour, early melodies that would later evolve into the song "Showroom Dummies" were being performed.

In mid-1976, Kraftwerk began to work on the album which was then called Europe Endless. Paul Alessandrini suggested that Kraftwerk write a song about the Trans Europ Express to reflect their electronic music style. Ralf Hütter and Florian Schneider met with musicians David Bowie and Iggy Pop prior to the recording, which influenced song lyrics. Maxime Schmitt encouraged the group to record a French language version of the song "Showroom Dummies", which led the group to later record several songs in French. The album was recorded at Kling Klang Studio in Düsseldorf. Artistic control over the songs was strictly in the hands of members Hütter and Schneider, with Bartos and Wolfgang Flür contributing sequenced electronic percussion. Kraftwerk went to railway bridges to listen to the sounds the train would actually produce. The group found the sound the train made was not danceable and changed it slightly.

== Recording ==
An important piece of new equipment used on the album was the Synthanorma Sequenzer, a customized 32-step 16-channel analog sequencer made for the band by Matten & Wiechers. This allowed the construction of more elaborate sequenced synthesizer lines, which are featured prominently in the tracks "Franz Schubert" and "Endless Endless", and liberated the player from the chore of playing repetitive keyboard patterns.

Whereas Radio-Activity had featured a mixture of German and English lyrics throughout the album, Trans-Europe Express went further and was mixed as two entirely separate versions, one sung in English, the other in German. At the recommendation of Maxime Schmitt, a French version of the song "Showroom Dummies", titled "Les Mannequins", was also recorded. "Les Mannequins" was the group's first song in French and would influence decisions to record songs in French on later albums. After recording the album in Düsseldorf, Hütter and Schneider visited Los Angeles to mix the tracks at the Record Plant Studio. Elements of the mixing sessions that were done in Los Angeles were dropped from the album, including the use of more upfront vocals in order to do more mixing in Düsseldorf and Hamburg later.

== Artwork ==
The artwork for the album cover of Trans-Europe Express was originally going to be a monochrome picture of the group reflected in a series of mirrors. This idea was dropped for a photo by New York-based celebrity photographer Maurice Seymour, with the group dressed in suits to resemble mannequins. J. Stara's image of the group was taken in Paris and is a highly retouched photo-montage of Kraftwerk from their shoulders up again posed as mannequins which are shown on the cover of the English version of the album. On the inside sleeve, a color collage of the group sitting at a small cafe table designed by Emil Schult was used. The photo for this scene was from the session by Maurice Seymour, taken on the group's American tour. Other photos were taken by Schult that show the group laughing and smiling. These were not used for the album's release.

== Composition ==
Wolfgang Flür has stated Kraftwerk were influenced by the music of the Weimar Germany era: "we were children who were born straight after World War Two ... we had no musical or pop culture of our own ... there was the war, and before the war we had only the German folk music. In the 1920s or 1930s melodies were developed and these became culture that we worked from". Karl Bartos also spoke of post-war influence as the group thought that they "had this development in the 1920s which was very, very strong and was audio visual. We had the Bauhaus school before the war and then after the war we had tremendous people like Karlheinz Stockhausen and the development of the classical and the electronic classical. This was very strong and it all happened very close to Düsseldorf in Cologne and all the great composers at that time came there." Paul Alessandrini is credited for helping contribute to the album's concept. Alessandrini told Hütter and Schneider that "with the kind of music you do, which is kind of like an electronic blues, railway stations and trains are very important in your universe, you should do a song about the Trans Europe Express". Kraftwerk believed critics in the United Kingdom and the United States associated them with Nazi Germany, with tracks such as "Autobahn" inextricably linked with the Nazis who built the high-speed roads in the 1930s and 1940s. At the same time, the band were keen to move away from their German heritage towards a new sense of European identity and felt that the Trans-Europe Express could be used to symbolize this. AllMusic referred to Trans-Europe Express as a concept album with two different themes. The first being the disparities between reality and image, represented by the songs "Hall of Mirrors" and "Showroom Dummies", and the others about the glorification of Europe. Slant Magazine described the album as "a sonic poem to Europe".

The musical style of Trans-Europe Express was described by AllMusic as melodic themes which are "repeated often and occasionally interwoven over deliberate, chugging beats, sometimes with manipulated vocals" and "minimalism, mechanized rhythms, and crafted, catchy melodies". The music has been categorized as electronic pop, synth-pop, experimental pop and avant-garde. Hütter has commented on the minimalist nature of the album, stating that "If we can convey an idea with one or two notes, it is better than to play a hundred or so notes". The first side of Trans-Europe Express has three songs. The song "Hall of Mirrors" has been described as containing deadpan vocals with lyrics that speculate how stars look at themselves in a looking glass. Hütter and Schneider have described the song as autobiographical. The third track "Showroom Dummies" was described by AllMusic as "bouncily melodic in a way that most of Trans-Europe Express isn't" and with lyrics which are "slightly paranoid". The idea for the song came from Flür and Bartos being compared to showroom dummies in a British concert review. Some versions of the song contain a spoken introduction starting with a count-in of "eins zwei drei vier" as a parody of the band Ramones who started some songs with a quick count-in of "one two three four". The second side of Trans-Europe Express is a suite with "Trans-Europe Express" continuing through to "Metal on Metal" and "Franz Schubert" before closing with a brief reiteration of the main theme from "Europe Endless". AllMusic described the musical elements of the suite as having a haunting theme with "deadpan chanting of the title phrase" which is "slowly layered over that rhythmic base in much the same way that the earlier 'Autobahn' was constructed". The song's lyrics reference the album Station to Station and meeting with musicians Iggy Pop and David Bowie. Hütter and Schneider had previously met up with Bowie in Germany and were flattered by the attention they received from him. Ralf Hütter was interested in Bowie's work as he had been working with Iggy Pop, who was the former lead singer of The Stooges; one of Hütter's favorite groups.

== Release ==
Trans-Europe Express was originally released in March 1977. With the help of Günther Fröhling, Kraftwerk made a promotional music video for the song "Trans-Europe Express". The video features the group wearing long coats on a train trip from Düsseldorf to nearby Duisburg. Photo stills from this video were later used on the single sleeve for "Showroom Dummies". Fröhling would work with Kraftwerk again on their album The Man-Machine doing the photography for the album cover. To promote the album to the press in France, EMI Records hired a train with old-fashioned carriages from the 1930s to travel from Paris to Rheims while the songs from the album were played over the train's announcement system for the critics.

In October 2009, a remastered edition of the album was released by EMI in Germany, Mute Records in the European Union and Astralwerks in the United States. This re-release was available on compact disc, digital download, and vinyl and features a different album cover from previous versions of the album. This new version features a black background with a white Trans Europ Express train in the center. The track listing on the 2009 re-release amends the titles of the songs to match the original German release. This change has "Metal on Metal" being credited for two minutes of the music with the remainder being a track titled "Abzug" (English: "Departure").

== Critical reception ==
Professional ratings
Review scores
Source	Rating
AllMusic	5/5 stars
Christgau's Record Guide	A−
Encyclopedia of Popular Music	5/5 stars
The Independent	5/5 stars
Mojo	5/5 stars
Q	5/5 stars
Rolling Stone	5/5 stars
The Rolling Stone Album Guide	5/5 stars
Spin Alternative Record Guide	9/10
Uncut	5/5 stars

Initial reviews for Trans-Europe Express were positive. Music critic Robert Christgau, in a review for The Village Voice, wrote that the album's "textural effects sound like parodies by some cosmic schoolboy of every lush synthesizer surge that's ever stuck in your gullet—yet also work the way those surges are supposed to work". Trans-Europe Express placed at number 30 in The Village Voice's 1977 Pazz & Jop critics' poll.

Modern reception has been very favorable. Trans-Europe Express has the highest possible ratings from publications including AllMusic, Drowned in Sound, Mojo, Rolling Stone and Slant Magazine. Steve Huey of AllMusic wrote that the album "is often cited as perhaps the archetypal (and most accessible) Kraftwerk album ... Overall, Trans-Europe Express offers the best blend of minimalism, mechanized rhythms, and crafted, catchy melodies in the group's catalog". Q, in a 1995 review, wrote that the album "changed the face of American dance music" and was "one of the most compelling beats of this or any other era". In 2009, Drowned in Sound's Chris Power stated that "Trans-Europe Express is all at once antique, timeless, retro and contemporary. Its status as modern electronic music's birth certificate is well-earned, but its hallowed reputation should never be allowed to disguise its true value and power as a work of art. Nor should it obscure a longevity that, 32 years on, we might as well start calling by its real name: immortality".

Trans-Europe Express has also appeared on top album lists from a variety of sources. In 2001, TV network VH1 placed Trans-Europe Express at number 56 on their list of "100 Greatest Albums (of Rock & Roll) of All Time". In 2002, Slant Magazine placed the album at number one on their list of the greatest electronic albums of the 20th century. In 2003, Rolling Stone placed the album at number 253 on their list of "The 500 Greatest Albums of All Time", with the ranking dropping to number 256 in a 2012 revision and climbing to number 238 in the 2020 reboot of the list. Channel 4 placed the album at number 71 on their list of the 100 greatest albums. In 2004, the online music website Pitchfork listed Trans-Europe Express as 6th best album of the 1970s, stating that "the day will soon come, if it hasn't already, that Trans-Europe Express joins the ranks of Sgt. Pepper's Lonely Hearts Club Band and Exile on Main St. as a record that simply cannot be written about". 2014, pop music critic Randall Roberts wrote in the Los Angeles Times that the record was the most important of the last forty years.

=== Legacy ===
Sal Cinquemani of Slant Magazine described the album's influence as "unprecedented, reaching as wide as rock (Radiohead's Kid A), hip-hop (Afrika Bambaataa's classic 'Planet Rock', Jay Dee's recent 'Big Booty Express') and pop (Madonna's Drowned World Tour, which incorporated samples of 'Metal on Metal')".

In the late 1970s, the album influenced post-punk band Joy Division; bassist Peter Hook related: "We were introduced to Kraftwerk by [singer] Ian Curtis, who insisted we play Trans Europe Express before we went on stage every time. The tape was played at the venue over the PA system, to be heard by everyone. The first time was Pips [a Manchester club well known for its 'Bowie Room']. Ian got thrown out for kicking glass around the dance floor in time to the track. It took us ages of pleading to get him back in." Drummer Stephen Morris also confirmed that Joy Division "used to play Trans-Europe Express before we went on stage, to get us into the zone. It worked because it gets up a lot of momentum. Trans-Europe Express just seemed to express an optimism – even if people see it as machine music". Morris also said: "It reminds me of Cabaret, the film, with all of the 1920s singing. ... When you get that marriage between humans and machines, and you get it right, it's fantastic. I have to say it's my favourite Kraftwerk album." In the mid-1980s, Siouxsie and the Banshees' rendition of "The Hall of Mirrors", on their album Through the Looking Glass, was one of the few cover versions that Ralf Hütter hailed in glowing terms as "extraordinary".

=== Accolades ===
Publication	Country	Accolade	Year	Rank
Blender	United States	500 CDs You Must Own Before You Die	2003	*
Paste	United States	The 70 Best Albums of the 1970s	2012	47
Pitchfork	United States	Top 100 Albums of the 1970s	2004	6
Robert Dimery	United States	1001 Albums You Must Hear Before You Die	2005	*
Rolling Stone	United States	The Rolling Stone 200: The Essential Rock Collection	1997	*
Rolling Stone	United States	The 500 Greatest Albums of All Time	2003	253
Rolling Stone	United States	The 500 Greatest Albums of All Time	2012	256
Rolling Stone	United States	The 500 Greatest Albums of All Time	2020	238
Rolling Stone	United States	The 500 Greatest Albums of All Time	2025	238
Slant Magazine	United States	The 25 Greatest Electronic Albums of the 20th Century	2005	1
Tom Moon	United States	1,000 Recordings to Hear Before You Die	2008	*
VH1	United States	The 100 Greatest Albums of Rock & Roll	2001	56
Vibe	100 Essential Albums of the 20th Century	1999	*	
Channel 4	United Kingdom	125 Nominations for the 100 Greatest Albums	2005	*
GQ	United Kingdom	The 100 Coolest Albums in the World Right Now!	2005	86
Gary Mulholland	United Kingdom	261 Greatest Albums Since Punk and Disco	2006	*
Mojo	United Kingdom	The 100 Greatest Albums Ever Made	1995	48
Mojo	United Kingdom	70 of the Greatest Albums of the 70s	2006	*
Mojo	United Kingdom	The Mojo Collection: The Ultimate Music Companion	2007	*
Muzik	United Kingdom	The 50 Most Influential Records of All Time	1999	8
Muzik	United Kingdom	Top 50 Dance Albums of All Time	2002	9
NME	United Kingdom	Albums of the Year (honorable mentions)	1977	*
NME	United Kingdom	All Times Top 100 Albums	1985	38
NME	United Kingdom	100 Best Albums of All Time	2003	36
NME	United Kingdom	The 500 Greatest Albums of All Time	2013	81
Paul Morley	United Kingdom	100 Greatest Albums of All Time	2013	*
Q	United Kingdom	The 50 Best Albums of the 70s	1998	9
Sounds	United Kingdom	Albums of the Year	1977	13
Sounds	United Kingdom	The 100 Best Albums of All Time	1985	48
The Observer	United Kingdom	50 Albums That Changed Music 1956-2006	2006	3
The Times	United Kingdom	The 20 Most Influential Albums	2008	11
Uncut	United Kingdom	100 Rock and Movie Icons	2005	23
The Wire	United Kingdom	The 100 Most Important Records Ever Made	1992	*
Adresseavisen	Norway	The 100 (+23) Best Albums of All Time	1995	15
Panorama	Norway	The 30 Best Albums of the Year 1970-98	1999	16
Pop	Sweden	The World's 100 Best Albums + 300 Complements	1994	101
Max	Germany	The 50 Best Albums of All Time	1997	22
Musik Express/Sounds	Germany	The 100 Masterpieces	1993	94
Musik Express/Sounds	Germany	The 50 Best German Records	2001	15
RoRoRo Rock-Lexicon	Germany	Most Recommended Albums	2003	*
Rolling Stone	Germany	The Best Albums of 5 Decades	1997	*
Rolling Stone	Germany	The 500 Best Albums of All Time	2004	325
Sounds	Germany	The 50 Best Albums of the 1970s	2009	10
Spex	Germany	The 100 Albums of the Century	1999	35
(*) designates lists that are unordered.

== Commercial performance ==
Trans-Europe Express charted higher in the United States than Kraftwerk's previous album Radio-Activity by peaking at number 117 on the Billboard Top LPs & Tape chart. "Trans-Europe Express" and "Showroom Dummies" were released as singles from the album. "Trans-Europe Express" charted on the Billboard Hot 100 in 1977 where it peaked at number 67. Trans-Europe Express began charting in the United Kingdom in the 1980s. The album entered the charts on 6 February 1982, staying in the charts for seven weeks and peaking at number 49. The re-released single for "Showroom Dummies" (a remix with additional drums) entered the charts on 20 February 1982, staying on the charts for five weeks and peaking at number 25.

== Track listing ==
Side one
No.	Title	Lyrics	Music	Length
1.	"Europe Endless" ("Europa Endlos")	Ralf Hütter; Florian Schneider	Hütter	9:40
2.	"The Hall of Mirrors" ("Spiegelsaal")	Hütter; Schneider; Emil Schult	Hütter	7:56
3.	"Showroom Dummies" ("Schaufensterpuppen")	Hütter	Hütter	6:15
Total length:				23:51

Side two
No.	Title	Lyrics	Music	Length
4.	"Trans-Europe Express" ("Trans Europa Express")	Hütter; Schult	Hütter	6:52
5.	"Metal on Metal" ("Metall auf Metall")		Hütter	2:11
6.	"Abzug^{[a]}"		Hütter	4:53
7.	"Franz Schubert"		Hütter	4:26
8.	"Endless Endless" ("Endlos Endlos")		Hütter; Schneider	0:55
Total length:				19:17 (42:45)

Notes

- ^{^[a]} While "Abzug" (English meaning "trigger" or "departure") appeared originally as a separate track on all pressings of Trans Europa Express, later releases of Trans-Europe Express combined "Abzug" and "Metal on Metal" together under the latter track's title, at a running time of 6:52. On both 2009 reissues of Trans Europa Express and Trans-Europe Express, however, "Abzug" is presented as a separate track.

== Personnel ==
Adapted from Trans-Europe Express liner notes.

=== Kraftwerk ===
- Ralf Hütter – voice, synthesizers, Vako Orchestron, synthanorma-sequenzer, electronics, producer
- Florian Schneider – voice, vocoder, votrax, synthesizer, electronics, producer
- Karl Bartos – electronic percussion
- Wolfgang Flür – electronic percussion

=== Technical ===
- Peter Bollig – engineer
- Bill Halverson – engineer (The Record Plant, Hollywood)
- Thomas Kuckuck – engineer (Rüssl Studio, Hamburg)

=== Design ===
- Maurice Seymour – photography
- J. Stara – photography
- Günther Fröhling – photography (2009 remaster only)
- Ink Studios – typographic design
- Johann Zambryski – artwork reconstruction (2009 remaster)

== Charts ==
=== Weekly charts ===
Chart (1977–1982)	Peak position
French Albums (SNEP)	2
German Albums (Offizielle Top 100)	32
Hungarian Albums (MAHASZ)	38
Italian Albums (FIMI)	8
Swedish Albums (Sverigetopplistan)	32
UK Albums (OCC)	49
US Billboard Top LPs & Tape	119

== Certifications ==
Region	Certification	Certified units/sales
United Kingdom (BPI)	Silver	60,000^{*}
^{*} Sales figures based on certification alone.
