= Emil Schult =

- Born: 10 October 1946 (age 79); Dessau, Germany
- Genres: Electronic; Experimental; Video; Painting
- Instruments: Guitar; violin; vocals

Emil Schult (born 10 October 1946) is a German painter, poet and audio-visual artist.

== Biography ==
After studying Sinology in Münster, Schult joined the Academy of Art in Düsseldorf in 1969 to study Fine Arts in the printmaking class of Dieter Roth, and later in the painting classes of Joseph Beuys and Gerhard Richter. In 1973, he finished his studies with the title of 'Meisterschüler' of Gerhard Richter. Both Joseph Beuys and Dieter Roth, as well as Roth's partner Dorothy Iannone, remained important for Schult's artistic development. In 1969, Schult lived in Reykjavik at Roth's studio-home.

Schult has developed a vast body of work beginning with prints, drawings, and artist's books that include philosophical writings, poems, comics, and collages. Early on he included film in his repertoire as well as painting – later on he only worked with reverse glass painting.

From 1970 to 1974, Schult collaborated with the Free International University, founded by Joseph Beuys. From 1973 to 1975 he also worked as an art teacher at a grammar school in Düsseldorf, then as a lecturer at the former college of education in Münster. Schult published books on art didactics.

In 1972, Schult started an artistic collaboration with Kraftwerk founders Ralf Hütter and Florian Schneider. As artist friends they created the "musicomix" poster for the album Ralf and Florian, further artwork for Autobahn and Radioactivity, and additional graphics. During the subsequent years of their collaboration, they also wrote lyrics and sound poetry for the albums Autobahn and Radioactivity, as well as the single "The Model", which was a number 1 hit in the UK, coupled with "Computer Love", which Schult also co-wrote. In addition, he collaborated with the band on the writing of their 1981 singles "Pocket Calculator" and "Computer World".

In 1979, he deepened his studies of Computer Music at the Stanford Artificial Intelligence Laboratory, Stanford University, CA, USA. Since the mid-1980s, Schult has also worked with video and computer-animated images.

In the late 1980s, he moved to the Bahamas, where he developed his distinctive style of reverse glass painting, which has informed his future work. This ancient Chinese technique opened to Schult a contemporary view on painting, as today the world is mostly perceived through glass – the window glass, the glass of the tablet, TV etc.

Since the early 1990s, he has lived in Düsseldorf, where he was commissioned to create a crypt for the Robert-Schumann Music Academy. The crypt is a complex artistic room intended to create an opportunity for student meditation. After submitting 50 photos of the crypt to Karlheinz Stockhausen, he composed a piece called "50 Klangbilder" for it. It was published in the form of a DVD in the publication Symbolik einer Krypta (Droste Verlag, 2012).

In Schult's artistic work, topics such as the evolution of the electronic chip play a central role, as well as a series of homages to the pioneers of electronic developments. His focus lies on the visionary potential of art and his recent paintings reflect on the connection between humans, the electronic microcosmos and the vastness of space.

Schult has recently held solo exhibitions at Osthaus Museum Hagen, DE, Burchfield Penney Art Center, Buffalo, NY, USA, Rauschenberg Gallery at Florida South Western State College, Fort Myers, FL, USA, Heinz Nixdorf MuseumsForum, Paderborn, DE, Institute for Electronic Arts at Alfred University, NY, USA, University of Illinois, Urbana-Champaign, IL, USA.

He served as a guest professor at the Institute for Electronic Arts, Alfred University, New York, USA.

His recent participations in group exhibitions include Deichtorhallen Hamburg, DE, Haus der Kulturen der Welt Berlin, DE, Galerie Buchholz New York, USA, AC Gallery Beijing, CHN, Zhang Zhou International Contemporary Art Exhibition, CHN, Kunsthalle Düsseldorf, DE, Raketenstation Hombroich, Neuss, DE, Tampa Museum of Art, FL, USA, Julia Stoschek Foundation, Düsseldorf, DE, et al.

Since 2017, Schult has collaborated with Emma Nilsson as TRANSHUMAN ART CRITICS. In 2019, Lothar Manteuffel and Max Dax joined the group. TRANSHUMAN ART CRITICS view the evolution of electronic music and art from the perception of enhanced humans. The observations are presented as audio-visual pieces in which the archeological findings merge with the cognition of future.

== List of works ==
=== Books (selection) ===
- FLUXUS to FUTURE. Works 1967 – 2017, ed. Emma Nilsson, Transhuman Art Critics Publishing, Düsseldorf, DE (2017)
- Emil Schult, Karlheinz Stockhausen: Symbolik einer Krypta, with DVD "50 Klangbilder" by Karlheinz Stockhausen, Droste Verlag, Düsseldorf (2012)
- Emil Schult: Test Bilder 1999 – Test Cards 1999, Catalogue, Edition of 500 (1999)
- Emil Schult, Peter Rech unter Mitarbeit von Lothar Manteuffel, Katarina Jacobsen und Notburga Rech: Spiele mit Kunst - Kunst-Spiele. Bergedorfer Förderprogramme 6, Text by Heiner Müller, Verlag Sigrid Persen, Hamburg – Horneburg/Niederelbe (1981)
- Liederheft. Guten Morgen Schöne Blume. 10 Lieder, Published by Gute Zeiten Musikverlag, Edition of 100 (1979)
- Liederheft. 10 Lieder, Published by Gute Zeiten Musikverlag, Edition of 100 (1977)
- Emil Schult, Peter W. Rech: Konzept Didaktik, unter Mitarbeit von Lothar Manteuffel u.v.a., Verlag für Lehr & Musische Bücher Emil Schult, Düsseldorf (1976)
- Emil W. Schult: Gesichter – Visages – Köppe – Faces – Capites – Heilabrot, Published by Edition Hansjörg Mayer, Stuttgart, Edition of 500 (1974)
- Der andere Comic "Dürerchen’s Mondfahrt" von Johannes Geuer, Emil Schult, Derrek Kremer, Young Voss, Christof Kohlhöfer, H.P. Wallner, self-published (1972)
- A Book of Man. Connected Memories. Finally. Part 3 B Tree, Published by Fred Jahn, Munich, Edition of 500 (1970)
- A Book of Man. Connected Drawings, Self-published, signed and numbered, Edition of 100 (1969)
- A Book of Man Second Part Two, Unique manuscript, Self-published in an amended version, Edition of 200, signed and numbered (1969)
- Es war einmal ein Gästebuch, Published as: Das war mal ein Gästebuch, publ. Galerie Fred Jahn, Edition of 1000 (1969)

=== Singles ===
- 1997 - Elektronisches Mosaic

=== Music release credits ===
- Kraftwerk - Ralf und Florian (1973) (design)
- Kraftwerk - Autobahn (1974) (lyrics and backing vocals - "Autobahn", album art)
- Kraftwerk - Radio-Activity (1975) (lyrics - "Radioactivity", "Radioland", "Airwaves", "The Voice of Energy", "Antenna", "Radio Stars", "Uranium"; album art)
- Kraftwerk - Trans-Europe Express (1977) (lyrics - "The Hall of Mirrors", "Trans-Europe Express"; album art)
- Kraftwerk - The Man-Machine (1978) (lyrics - "The Model")
- Rhinegold - Rhinegold (1980) (co-writer - "Rendezvous")
- Kraftwerk - Computer World (1981) (lyrics - "Computer World", "Pocket Calculator", "Computer Love"; graphics)
- Rhinegold - Fan Fan Fanatic (1982) (co-writer - "Fan Fan Fanatic", "A Moment's Glance")
- Rhinegold - Distanz (1984) (co-writer - "Via Satelit")
- Kraftwerk - Electric Café (1986) (co-writer - "Techno Pop", album art)
- The Bongos - Phantom Train (1986; released in 2012) (album art, photography)
- Blue in Heaven - Explicit Material (1986) (front cover photography)
- Wally Badarou - Words of a Mountain (1989) (flute, violin)
- Electrik Music - "Crosstalk" single (1992) (co-writer - "Crosstalk", "Intercomix"; cover art)
- Electrik Music - Esperanto (1993) (co-writer - "Crosstalk", album art)
- Electrik Music - "TV" single (1993) (cover art)
- Information Society - Peace and Love, Inc. (1992) (backing vocals - "Where Would I Be Without IBM")
- Inga Rumpf - The Best of All My Years... So Far (1997) (booklet photography)
- Nalin & Kane - "Talkin' About" single (1997) (cover art)
- Yamo - Time Pie (1997) (additional lyrics - "Aurora Borealis (Greatest Show for Free)")
- Roland Sebastian Faber - Hommage An Die Jugend Europas (2007) (cover art)
- Roland Sebastian Faber - Gropiusstadt EP (2010) (cover art)
- Roland Sebastian Faber - Gegen Den Strom EP (2011) (cover art)

=== Other artwork ===
- Jürgen W. Müller: Depeche Mode - More than a band (English Edition); frontcover plus in-depth interview with Schult on Kraftwerk, music, art and aesthetics; 2026
