= Autobahn (song) =

1975 single by Kraftwerk

Single by Kraftwerk

from the album Autobahn
- B-side: "Morgenspaziergang"; "Kometenmelodie 1"
- Released: February 1975
- Recorded: 1974
- Genre: Synth-pop; electronic; ambient; experimental; pop
- Length: 22:43 (album version); 14:29 (3-D The Catalogue); 3:28 (single edit); 3:06 (UK single edit)
- Label: Philips; Vertigo
- Songwriters: Ralf Hütter; Florian Schneider; Emil Schult
- Producers: Kraftwerk; Conny Plank

Kraftwerk singles chronology
"Kometenmelodie 2" (1974)	"Autobahn" (1975)	"Radioactivity" (1976)

"Autobahn" is a song by the German electronic band Kraftwerk, released in 1975 as the lead single from their album Autobahn (1974). The song was composed by Ralf Hütter and Florian Schneider of the band, with Emil Schult collaborating on the lyrics. It was co-produced by Conny Plank, and is the band's first track to use sung lyrics. Recorded in 1974, the song is designed to capture the feel of driving on a motorway, and runs as long as 22 minutes in the album. "Autobahn" is Kraftwerk's biggest hit in the US, reaching number 25 on the Billboard Hot 100. The song was arranged and revamped in 1991 appearing on Kraftwerk's album The Mix.

== Composition and lyrics ==
Unlike Kraftwerk's later work, "Autobahn" was only released with German lyrics, without a simultaneous English-language release. The main refrain "Fahren Fahren Fahren" was often mistaken for the English phrase "Fun Fun Fun" and thought to be a reference to the 1964 Beach Boys' song "Fun, Fun, Fun" to which band member Wolfgang Flür later commented:

No! Someone else told me that they [the misinterpreters] thought the way we speak in German "Fahren", which means driving, sounds like the English word "fun". "Fahren fahren fahren", "fun fun fun". That is wrong. But it works. Driving is fun. We had no speed limit on the autobahn, we could race through the highways, through the Alps, so yes, fahren fahren fahren, fun fun fun. But it wasn't anything to do with the Beach Boys! We used to drive a lot, we used to listen to the sound of driving, the wind, passing cars and lorries, the rain, every moment the sounds around you are changing, and the idea was to rebuild those sounds on the synth.

Ralf Hütter has said that the Beach Boys were an influence on the band, but described the song as a "sound painting", reflecting the band's experiences on tour. The song also included acoustic elements such as a flute played by Florian Schneider and atmospheric guitars. For this song a Minimoog was used to play the bass line, and an octave riff with added analogue echo. It also included use of a vocoder to process some of the vocals and use of the motorik drum rhythm over the song's final section.

== Release and reception ==
The original album version of the song lasts twenty-two minutes, but the song was edited down to three minutes for its single version. The song was Kraftwerk's first hit, reaching No. 11 on the British charts where it later was included in the UK compilation LP Exceller 8. The single was also successful in other countries; it reached No. 25 in US Billboard Hot 100 and No. 43 in Adult Contemporary. It also reached No. 9 in Germany and No. 12 in Canada. A twelve-minute animated video of "Autobahn" directed by Roger Mainwood was released in 1979. A nine-minute version was created by the band for their dance-oriented 90s album The Mix. "Autobahn" is widely considered to be one of Kraftwerk's greatest songs. In 2020, Billboard and The Guardian ranked the song number 6 and number 5, respectively, on its lists of the greatest Kraftwerk songs. OMD frontman Andy McCluskey cited "Autobahn" as the song he wished he had written, saying, "It changed my life... It really was the future."

== Charts ==
=== Weekly charts ===
Chart (1974–1975)	Peak position
Australia (Kent Music Report)	30
Austria (Ö3 Austria Top 40)	15
Belgium (Ultratop 50 Flanders)	27
Canada Top Singles (RPM)	12
Germany (GfK)	9
Netherlands (Dutch Top 40)	12
Netherlands (Single Top 100)	16
New Zealand (Recorded Music NZ)	4
Ireland IRMA	20
South Africa (Springbok Radio)	15
UK Singles (Official Charts)	11
US Billboard Hot 100	25
US Adult Contemporary (Billboard)	43

=== Year-end charts ===
Chart (1975)	Position
Canada Top Singles (RPM)	117
