= Fritz Hilpert =

- Born: 31 May 1956 (age 70); Amberg, West Germany
- Origin: Germany
- Occupation: Audio engineering
- Instrument: Electronic percussion
- Years active: 1989–2022 (on stage)
- Website: www.kraftwerk.com

Friedrich "Fritz" Hilpert (born 31 May 1956) is a German musician who is best known for his work as a member of the electropop group Kraftwerk.

== Background ==
Fritz Hilpert studied trumpet and percussion at the Musisches Max-Reger-Gymnasium, Germany, until 1976. He also played drums in several live bands at that time.

From 1978 he studied sound engineering at the Musikhochschule Rheinland and the FH Düsseldorf. In 1986 he received his Diplom-Ingenieur qualification (the German equivalent of a Master of Science degree) in sound and image technology.

He worked as freelance sound engineer with several German acts as the new wave-band Din A Testbild before becoming associated with Kraftwerk in 1989.

In addition to studio work, he replaced Wolfgang Flür in concert when Kraftwerk resumed their touring activities in 1990, and engineered the album The Mix, released in 1991.

He has made musical contributions to Kraftwerk's compositions since "Expo 2000" in 1999. He is credited as a co-composer on most of the tracks on the album Tour de France Soundtracks. Along with Henning Schmitz, he works as sound programmer and engineer at Kling Klang studio and is administrator of the Kraftwerk.com and Klingklang.com websites.

While on tour with Kraftwerk in Australia, where the band were to be Global Gathering headliners, Fritz Hilpert fell ill and was believed to have suffered some sort of heart failure. This forced Kraftwerk to cancel the Melbourne show on 22 November 2008, but Hilpert was cleared to fly and continue the tour the next day.

It is thought that Hilpert's last appearance on stage with Kraftwerk was at the Cala Mijas music festival, in Malaga, Spain, on 2 September 2022.

Hilpert did not appear onstage with Kraftwerk for its 2023 concert series, fueling fan speculation of his departure from the band. His status as a current or ex-band member has not yet been officially disclosed; however, it was announced on 18 March 2026 that he and Ralf Hütter worked together on Kraftwerk's upcoming fiftieth anniversary Super Deluxe Edition Dolby Atmos re-release of 1975's Radio-Activity, indicating that he may still be actively working with the band.
