= Kling Klang Studio =

German recording studio; private music studio of the band Kraftwerk

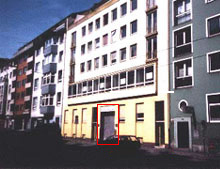
The original site of Kraftwerk's Kling Klang Studio in Düsseldorf.

Kling Klang (also spelled as Klingklang) is the private music studio of the band Kraftwerk. The name is taken from the first song on the Kraftwerk 2 album. The studio was originally located at Mintropstraße 16 in Düsseldorf, Germany, near to Düsseldorf Hauptbahnhof, but in mid-2009 moved to Meerbusch-Osterath, around 10 kilometers west of Düsseldorf. The band also operate a record label named Kling Klang, which they use to release their music.

== Background ==
Kling Klang
- Founded: 1975
- Founder: Kraftwerk
- Distributors: EMI (1975–2012); Parlophone (2013–present); Warner Music Group (1981–present)
- Genre: Electronic
- Country of origin: Germany
- Location: Düsseldorf
- Official website: www.klingklangkonsumprodukt.com

Kling Klang (an onomatopœia; in English: ding dong) began as a studio in 1970; the band marked this as the real beginning of Kraftwerk. The studio began as an empty room in a workshop premises located in an industrial part of Düsseldorf. The building exterior was clad in yellow tiles with a large electric shuttered doorway leading to an enclosed courtyard. On the right was a loading stage used by an electrical installation company that used the upper floor. The studio was accessed through a small anteroom. The main studio room was fitted with sound insulation and measured about sixty square feet. Later on other adjoining rooms were used for things like making instruments such as home made oscillators. The basement of the studio was used to store old instruments and machines. The band never threw anything away, and subsequently used the older equipment to recreate sounds.

When first using the studio, the band recorded with stereo tape machines and cassette recorders. These master tapes were then taken to a commercial recording studio for the final mix down. Part of the reason for this was so the band could self-produce their albums. The PA equipment at this time was self constructed and consisted of plywood bass horns and cast aluminium mid range horns. In 1971 Kraftwerk was still without a drummer, so the group purchased a cheap drum machine. By treating the sounds with echo and filtering they used the drum machine to record rhythm tracks for their second album. During the making of their third album, they purchased their first commercial synthesisers for the studio, the Minimoog and EMS Synthi AKS. Other equipment at this time included an Echolette Tape Echo. Wolfgang Flür had joined the band at this time and was using a custom built electronic drum system. At the time of his first visit, a small acoustic drum kit was in the studio. It was in 1973 that the studio was christened Kling Klang. After Karl Bartos joined the band, more studio equipment was designed by all four band members. A full-time engineer was employed to assist with the designs and new equipment purchases.

In 1976 Kraftwerk began recording Trans-Europe Express at Kling Klang studio. Hütter and Schneider had commissioned Matten & Wiechers, the Bonn based synthesizer studio, to design and build two "Synthanorma" (32-step music sequencers). The "Synthanorma" controlled the band's Minimoog creating the album's rhythmic sound.

The band members had begun spending eight to ten hours a day in the studio, regarding themselves as "musical workers". That time was spent designing a complete portable studio setup, including stage backdrops, curtains, lighting, staging and a stereo PA system. Portable nineteen inch equipment frames were designed and linked to other equipment using custom made wiring looms used for quick dismantling while touring. This new system of mobile equipment was designed for the Computer World tour and replaced the previous "messy" system. Kraftwerk spent three years designing the newer system. The newer studio could be set up in about two hours and was far easier to transport whilst touring. The Kling Klang 12k PA system was also designed to be portable and matched the grey colour of the equipment frames.

== Studio relocation ==
In September 2007, the Neuss-Grevenbroicher Zeitung reported that Ralf Hütter had purchased property space in a proposed new commercial property development ("Mollsfeld") in Meerbusch-Osterath, about 10 kilometers west of Düsseldorf, with the intention of building a new sound studio and office there, so that Kraftwerk's recording, merchandise, and administration can be managed from a single location. The move to the new premises was completed in mid-2009 and, as well as sound recording, the new Kling Klang includes a rehearsal space for the preparation of concert performances.

== Kling Klang as a record label and music publishing rights ==
Starting in 1975, Kraftwerk released its records on the vanity label Kling Klang Schallplatten. Later and current releases are credited to Kling Klang Produkt, or simply Klingklang. EMI and Warner Music Group, along with their subsidiaries, have promoted and distributed the records in various territories. Kling Klang Music and No Hassle Music existed as music-publishing companies for a small period of time in the United States, being associated with ASCAP. In 1999, the band signed a new worldwide deal with Sony/ATV Music Publishing. In 2013, the band's entire recorded catalogue went to Warner Music; a rare example, given that the catalogue of Kraftwerk's German label, EMI Electrola, was consolidated when EMI was sold to Universal Music.

== Kling Klang Konsumprodukt GmbH ==
Kraftwerk also sells all of its band merchandise through Kling Klang Konsumprodukt.
