= Exceller 8 =

Compilation album by Kraftwerk
- Released: October 1975
- Recorded: 1970–1974
- Genre: Krautrock; electronic
- Length: 37:28
- Label: Vertigo

Kraftwerk chronology
Autobahn (1974)	Exceller 8 (1975)	Radio-Activity (1975)

Exceller 8 is the title of a 1975 compilation album of music by Kraftwerk. It was released by the Vertigo label (sister label Mercury Records in Canada) in order to capitalize on both the summer chart success of the single "Autobahn" and the imminent release of the next Kraftwerk album Radio-Activity. By this time, Ralf Hütter and Florian Schneider had set up their own record and publishing company, Kling Klang.

== Background ==
The album is a sampler of material from the first four Kraftwerk albums – Kraftwerk, Kraftwerk 2, Ralf und Florian, Autobahn – and includes some versions of tracks that had been edited down for release on singles, such as "Autobahn", as well as simple excerpts from longer album tracks, such as "Kling-Klang". Only the pair of tracks from the Ralf und Florian album, "Tongebirge" and "Kristallo", are entirely free of cuts.

Track selection was by Alan Cowderoy (later an A&R manager at Stiff Records) and sound engineering is credited to Steve Brown, though it is unclear if they created the edited versions of the two tracks released as singles. The three-minute version of "Autobahn" (edited down from an original album length of 22:30) is the same as the three-minute UK single mix, which had been a top 20 hit in the UK. A different 3:28 edit, released in 1974, received considerable airplay in the US. "Comet Melody 2" failed to chart.

The album was issued on vinyl, 8-Track and cassette and deleted in 1980.

== Reception ==
Professional ratings
Review scores
Source	Rating
Allmusic	3/5 stars

From contemporary reviews, a reviewer credited as "Miles" reviewed the album in New Musical Express, describing it as "a good selection, I guess" finding that the "album sounds mechanical, even for [Kraftwerk]" and that the group "sound so detached, the kind of guys who could blow up the planet just to hear the noise it made".

== Track listing ==
All tracks are written by Ralf Hütter and Florian Scheinder.

No.	Title	Length
1.	"Ruckzuck" (Minus the opening flute-echo introduction)	7:30
2.	"Autobahn" (New edited version)	3:06
3.	"Tongebirge"	2:50
4.	"Kristallo"	6:18
5.	"Comet Melody 2 (Kometenmelodie II)" (Version released as a single in August 1975 with the middle section edited out)	2:49
6.	"Klingklang" (Excerpt beginning at 1:38 into the original track)	9:20
7.	"Vom Himmel Hoch" (The opening and closing sections with a cross fade link)	4:00
8.	"Stratovarius" (Excerpt of the final section)	1:35
