= Kraftwerk (album) =

1970 studio album by Kraftwerk

Studio album by Kraftwerk
- Released: November 1970
- Recorded: July–September 1970
- Studio: Kling Klang Studio
- Genres: Krautrock; ambient; musique concrète; art rock
- Length: 39:39
- Language: German
- Label: Philips
- Producers: Ralf Hütter; Florian Schneider; Conny Plank

Kraftwerk chronology
Kraftwerk (1970)	Kraftwerk 2 (1972)

Kraftwerk is the debut studio album by German electronic band Kraftwerk, released in Germany by Philips in November 1970. It was recorded by Ralf Hütter and Florian Schneider, following their departure from Organisation, and produced by Konrad "Conny" Plank.

The debut, compared to their previous work, showcases a disciplined structure and a motorik-groove development. Since their tour in support of their 1974 album Autobahn, Kraftwerk has not reissued nor performed any of the material from this album.

Retrospective reviews highlighted its slow and positively primitive approach that denies instant gratification in favor of patience, while others found it "bleak" and "spartan". The song "Ruckzuck" was singled out as the high point, placed on several accolade lists including "twenty essential Krautrock tracks" and "greatest songs recorded by Kraftwerk". NME ranked Kraftwerk's debut album at the second-to-last place in the band's discography, ahead of Electric Café (1986).

== Background and recording ==
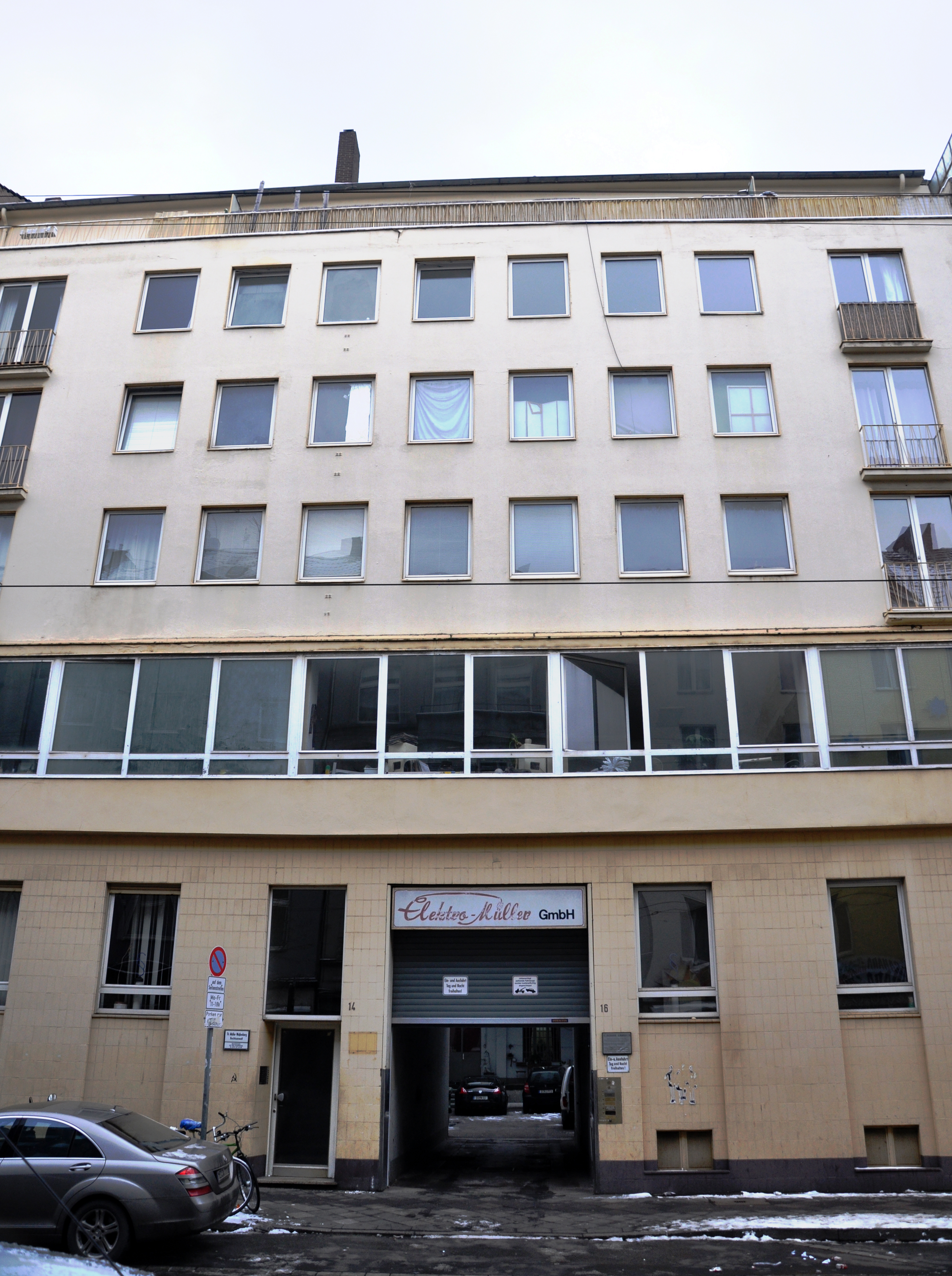
Kling Klang Studio, where Kraftwerk recorded their debut, was located in the backyard of Mintropstraße 16 in Düsseldorf.

After the commercial failure of their previous record, Tone Float (1970), Ralf Hütter and Florian Schneider of Organisation were dropped by RCA Records and signed a new deal with Philips, the third band to join its roster after Frumpy and Ihre Kinder. Hütter and Schneider named the new project Kraftwerk, inspired by the industrial environment of Düsseldorf and embracement of their German roots. Moreover, the German identity manifested itself in the song titles written exclusively in German. To begin work, the duo rented an empty workshop in an industrial part of Düsseldorf near a railway station, which would be eventually called Kling Klang Studio. They outfitted it with audio insulation, and recorded rough masters on stereo-tape machines and cassette recorders, subsequently bringing them to a well-equipped studio for mixing.

The album was recorded between July to September 1970 and produced by Conny Plank who shared the credit with Hütter and Schneider. During recording, they were also joined by two drummers, Andreas Hohmann and Klaus Dinger, with Hohmann playing on "Ruckzuck" and "Stratovarius", while Dinger played on "Vom Himmel Hoch". Kraftwerk decided to use acoustic drums, amplified by the use of contact microphones, a choice which was not readily accepted by the drummers. The other instrumentation included Schneider on flute, while Hütter played guitar, as well as modified Hammond organ and Tubon electric organs, the latter made by Swedish factory Joh Mustad AB in 1966. Some of the acoustic instruments were manipulated by a pitch-to-voltage converter, which created the duplicate sounds heard throughout the record.

== Composition ==
Ned Raggett, writing for AllMusic, describes Kraftwerk as an art rock album with psych roots and "sudden jump cuts of musique concrète noise and circular jamming as prone to sprawl as it is to tight focus". Adam Blyweiss saw the traces of "credible jazz, rock noise and funk jiggle", while David Stubbs wrote that the record "oscillates between passages of percussive fury and rhythmless, amorphous experimentalism", and represents a crucial step in Kraftwerk's musical evolution. The album is based around repeated note sequences that were pre-recorded and mixed on tape, and diversified by "organ tone clusters" and flute feedback sounds.

The song "Ruckzuck" is driven by a motorik groove and powerful multi-dubbed flute riff. NME characterizes "Ruckzuck" as "skirting around the edges of free jazz". According to Stubbs, Schneider's flute playing on the track is comparable to the "breathy fury" of Roland Kirk, within the "linear restraint" of the looped and varispeeded drum cycle. "Stratovarius" begins with an "ominous cloud of electronic noise" that evolves into an acid rock improvisation, similarly powered by motorik groove. Stubbs highlights the track's "desultory musique concrète clatter" and conference between a guitar-like violin and heavy percussion. "Megaherz" is a more subdued track, bringing hints of ambient music, and the only one to feature no drums. Pascal Bussy discerns a "cathedral-like quality" in "Megaherz". Anderson describes "Vom Himmel Hoch" as a "doomy soundscape", simulating a bombing raid and ending in an apocalyptic explosion. The track has slight pitch curves that emulate the Doppler effect. Its title refers to "Vom Himmel hoch, da komm ich her", the Martin Luther nativity text set by Johann Sebastian Bach.

== Release ==
The inner sleeve of the first-print of debut LP contained a photo of an electric generator, which, according to Bussy, complements the band's industrial theme.

Kraftwerk was released by Philips Records in Germany in November 1970. The album cover features a drawing of a fluorescent-coloured traffic cone, inspired by the works of Andy Warhol and the pop art movement in general. Record Collector's David Hemingway describes the sleeve as "iconic" and minimalistic. The inner sleeve of the first printing contained a photo of an electric generator, which, according to Bussy, complements the band's industrial theme. In 1972 the debut, along with their second album, were reissued in Britain by Philips' imprint company Vertigo Records as a double-set packaged in a different sleeve depicting a blue oscillating wave.

In early 1971, Hütter briefly split from the band to study architecture in Aachen, leaving Schneider, drummer Dinger and newcomer guitarist Michael Rother. The three-member lineup—Schneider, Dinger and Rother—made an appearance on Radio Bremen, and on the TV shows Beat-Club and Okidoki, the former of which featured an improvisation titled "Truckstop Gondolero". Shortly thereafter, Dinger and Rother left to form the band Neu!, with Hütter re-joining Schneider to continue Kraftwerk.

The song "Ruckzuck" often served as an opener for Kraftwerk's early concerts. Since their tour in support of their 1975 album Autobahn, Kraftwerk has not performed any of the material from this album. In later interview, Schneider referred to the first three Kraftwerk albums as "archaeology", and while after 1974 they have never been officially reissued, bootleg recordings have been available as a result. In 2007, Kraftwerk hinted that the album might finally see a remastered CD release following the Der Katalog box-set release. Vinyl releases of the first two albums were scheduled for Record Store Day 2020 but were ultimately cancelled.

== Critical reception ==
Retrospective reviews
Review scores
Source	Rating
AllMusic	3/5 stars
The Encyclopedia of Popular Music	2/5 stars
The Great Rock Discography	4/10
Spin Alternative Record Guide	7/10
Sputnikmusic	4/5 stars
Treblezine	6/10

The February 1972 issue of Sounds magazine published a readers’ poll on German music, which chose "Ruckzuck" as the best track of the year, ahead of Tangerine Dream’s "Alpha Centauri" and Et Cetera’s "Raga", and Can's "Halleluhwah". During his 1978 recording sessions in Berlin, David Bowie deemed their earlier work to be "invigorating" and "free-form".

"Praise Jimmy", reviewing Kraftwerk for the Sputnikmusic, favorably compared it to the band's classic works, describing it as "remarkably human", "eager", and "organic", largely contrasting with the "cold, robotic steel" of their classics. Jimmy also highlighted the album's slow and primitive approach that denies instant gratification in favor of patience, elaborating that there are "a lot of instances in which it seems like the band are noodling around, but it doesn't exactly mean they're lost" and have "eagerness" equal to "nothing short of charming to say the least". Adam Blyweiss of Treblezine appraised it as a "totally different kind of acquired taste than their later techno, but a fascinating listen nonetheless". The Encyclopedia of Popular Music characterized their debut effort as "bleak, spartan music".

In a mixed review, Ned Raggett of AllMusic lamented absence of Kraftwerk's trademark clipped keyboard melodies, but appreciated the "brilliant co-production and engineering skills" demonstrated by Plank, assessing his input to be as important as the band performances. He warmly reviewed Hütter's organ work on the "extended opening drone moan" of "Stratovarius" joined by Schneider's "eerie violin work". In Record Collector, Hemingway describes its sound as being "as far away as it was possible to get" from Kraftwerk's Vertigo labelmates like Black Sabbath and Manfred Mann's Earth Band, citing the music's "musique concrete, organ tone clusters, and flute feedback." He added that, despite its relatively "inelegant" sound, the record hints at Kraftwerk's later music, evident not only with the "understated melodies and electronic experimentation" of pieces like "Megaherz" and "Vom Himmel Hoch" but also Schneider's early attempts at home-made rhythm instruments presaging those the band later employed.

Biba Kopf of The Wire reflected that Kraftwerk "made the first significant steps towards a new form of amplified music, substantially different from its US/UK counterparts yet just as explosive, by reducing rock to its core elements — the basest beats, raw electric monotones, deliberately monotonous stop-start and fast-slow rhythms." In The Ambient Century (2000), Mark Prendergast refers to Kraftwerk as "pure sound manipulation, a product of [Kraftwerk's] LSD experience of the late 1960s, a nerve-racking ride through machine sounds which ended with a veritable recreation of aerial bombing."

=== Legacy ===
"Ruckzuck" was used as the theme song for the PBS show Newton's Apple in the United States. However, its use was unauthorized, and the program later substituted it with a cover version. The track also became a hit in Germany after it featured as the theme tune to the magazine television show Kennzeichen D, and was one of two German underground rock songs of the era to become a hit through TV usage, alongside Can's "Spoon".

In 2019, Stereogum ranked the 1971 Radio Bremen version of "Ruckzuck" among twenty essential Krautrock tracks, highlighting Schneider's "ascent-descent flute intro" as "iconic" and resembling blueprints for the beginning of their future track "Trans-Europe Express". In 2020, The Guardian ranked thirty "greatest songs" recorded by Kraftwerk, placing "Ruckzuck" at the tenth spot and describing its "driving repetitive rhythms" as "almost proto-techno". The same year, NME ranked Kraftwerk's debut album at the second-to-last place in the band's discography, ahead of Electric Café (1986), elaborating that the album is not "tearing up any trees in the 31st century electronica stakes, but it's still a fascinating record".

German ensemble Zeitkratzer released a cover album Performs Songs From The Albums Kraftwerk And Kraftwerk 2 in March 2017, which includes reworked versions of Kraftwerk and Kraftwerk 2. The 1997 album Die Roboter Rubato by American musician Terre Thaemlitz contains piano interpretations of Kraftwerk tracks, including the song "Ruckzuck".

== Track listing ==
All tracks are written by Ralf Hütter and Florian Schneider-Esleben.

Side one
No.	Title	Length
1.	"Ruckzuck"	7:47
2.	"Stratovarius"	12:10

Side two
No.	Title	Length
1.	"Megaherz"	9:30
2.	"Vom Himmel Hoch"	10:12
Total length:		39:39

== Personnel ==
Credited adapted from LP liner notes, except where otherwise noted.

Kraftwerk

- Ralf Hütter – organ, Tubon, guitar
- Florian Schneider-Esleben – flute, violin, electric percussion
- Andreas Hohmann – drums ("Ruckzuck", "Stratovarius")
- Klaus Dinger – drums ("Vom Himmel Hoch")

Technical

- Conrad Plank – producer, engineer
- Klaus Löhmer – assistant
- Ralf Hütter – cover
- Bernd and Hilla Becher – photography (Note: The inner-sleeve photograph of a power station.)

== Charts ==
=== Weekly charts ===
Chart (1971)	Peak position
German Albums (Offizielle Top 100)	30

=== Year-end charts ===
Chart (1971)	Position
German Albums (Offizielle Top 100)	27

== Bibliography ==
=== Books ===
- Young, Rob; Schmidt, Irmin (2018). All Gates Open: The Story of Can (e-book ed.). London: Faber and Faber. ISBN 978-0-571-31151-4.
- Smolko, Tim; Smolko, Joanna (2021). Atomic Tunes: The Cold War in American and British Popular Music. Indiana University Press. ISBN 978-0-253-05618-4.
- Esch, Rudi (26 August 2016). Electri_City: The Düsseldorf School of Electronic Music. Omnibus Press. ISBN 978-1-78323-776-0.
- Stubbs, David (2014). Future Days: Krautrock and the Building of Modern Germany. Faber & Faber. ISBN 978-0-571-28334-7.
- Thompson, Dave (2021). I Feel Love: Donna Summer, Giorgio Moroder, and How They Reinvented Music. Rowman & Littlefield. ISBN 978-1-4930-4981-3.
- Koch, Albert (2005). Kraftwerk (in German). Hannibal. ISBN 978-3-85445-213-3.
- Schütte, Uwe (2020). Kraftwerk: Future Music from Germany. Penguin UK. ISBN 978-0-241-32055-6.
- Adelt, Ulrich (2016). Krautrock: German Music in the Seventies. University of Michigan Press. ISBN 978-0-472-05319-3.
- Bussy, Pascal (1993). Kraftwerk—Man, Machine & Music. SAF Publishing. ISBN 978-0-946719-70-9.
- Albiez, Sean; Pattie, David (2011). Kraftwerk: Music Non-Stop. A&C Black. ISBN 978-1-4411-9136-6.
- Weisbard, Eric; Marks, Craig, eds. (1995). "Kraftwerk". Spin Alternative Record Guide. New York: Vintage Books. ISBN 0-679-75574-8.
- Prendergast, Mark J. (2000). The Ambient Century: From Mahler to Moby – The Evolution of Sound in the Electronic Age. New York: Bloomsbury Publishing. ISBN 978-1-58234-134-7.
- Strong, Martin C. (2006). "Kraftwerk". The Great Rock Discography. Edinburgh: Canongate Books. ISBN 1-84195-827-1.
- Larkin, Colin, ed. (1997). "Kraftwerk". The Virgin Encyclopedia of Popular Music (Concise ed.). Virgin Books. ISBN 1-85227-745-9.
- Schraenen, Guy; Brach, Bettina (2005). Vinyl: Records and Covers by Artists, a Survey. Germany: Neues Museum Weserburg.

=== Magazines ===
- Anderson, Jason (April 2023). "The Ultimate Music Guide - Kraftwerk". Uncut. pp. 8–11.
- Williamson, Nigel (April 2023). "The Ultimate Music Guide - Kraftwerk". Uncut. pp. 18–21.
