= The Telephone Call =

Single by Kraftwerk

from the album Electric Café
- B-side: "House Phone"
- Released: February 1987
- Genre: Electronic; techno
- Length: 8:03 (album version); 3:50 (7" remix); 8:12 (12" remix)
- Label: Kling Klang; EMI; Warner Bros.
- Songwriters: Ralf Hütter; Florian Schneider; Karl Bartos

Kraftwerk singles chronology
"Musique Non-Stop" (1986)	"The Telephone Call" (1987)	"The Robots (re-release)" (1991)

Audio
- "The Telephone Call" on YouTube

"The Telephone Call" (German: "Der Telefon-Anruf") is a song by the German electronic band Kraftwerk. It was released in 1987 as the second and final single from their ninth studio album, Electric Café (1986). The single was their second number-one on the Billboard Hot Dance Club Play and stayed two weeks at the number-one spot. It is the only Kraftwerk song to feature Karl Bartos on vocals. The versions from the single were remixed by François Kevorkian and Ron Saint Germain.

== Versions ==
In the 2009 remastered edition of Electric Café, which was issued under the album's original intended title Techno Pop, the original album version of 'The Telephone Call' is absent, replaced by the shorter and subtly-different 7-inch single mix. As a replacement for the latter part of the original album track (which contained telephone sounds and operator voices), the remix "House Phone" was inserted. However, when the remastered album was originally issued in 2004 as part of the promotional version of The Catalogue, the original album version was featured and "House Phone" was not, as the album featured its original 6 tracks with no bonuses. The promo copies of the box set containing the earlier remaster of Techno Pop were subsequently withdrawn and became collector's items.

== Music video ==
The song's black-and-white music video features each member of the band answering a telephone (Ralf Hütter's being a novelty grand piano-shaped telephone which he happens to play before picking the receiver up). None of the band members are seen singing the song in the video except for a silhouetted Karl Bartos, but when the camera pans around it is revealed to in fact be Wolfgang Flür. He is also seen at a typewriter typing "You're so close, but far away". At several other points in the video, various other iconic images are seen including a dangling telephone on a wire and an eye staring through a hole in a wall, the latter appearing for only one second in the video. The images give the video an unsettling feeling. Also another iconic image that does appear in some sequences is a "magnetophon" machine (a tape recorder) in which the tape spools are spinning and the tape is running; because supposedly there is being recorded or being played from some telephone message.

== Track listing ==
English versions only

=== 7-inch single ===
All tracks are written by Ralf Hütter, Florian Schneider and Karl Bartos.
Remixed by Kraftwerk, François Kevorkian and Ron St. Germain.

Side one
No.	Title	Length
1.	"The Telephone Call"	3:49

Side two
No.	Title	Length
1.	"Der Telefon-Anruf" (German Version)	3:49

=== 12-inch single ===
All tracks are written by Ralf Hütter, Florian Schneider and Karl Bartos.
Remixed by Kraftwerk, François Kevorkian and Ron St. Germain.

Side one
No.	Title	Length
1.	"The Telephone Call" (Remix)	8:12

Side two
No.	Title	Length
1.	"House Phone"	4:54
2.	"Der Telefon-Anruf" (German Version)	3:49

== Charts ==
=== Weekly charts ===
Weekly chart performance for "The Telephone Call"
Chart (1987)	Peak position
UK Singles (Official Charts)	89
US Dance Club Songs (Billboard)	1
US Dance Singles Sales (Billboard)	18

=== Year-end charts ===
Year-end chart performance for "The Telephone Call"
Chart (1987)	Position
US Dance Club Songs (Billboard)	43
