= Ralf & Florian =

Studio album by Kraftwerk
- Released: October 1973
- Recorded: May – July 1973
- Studios: Kraftwerk (Düsseldorf); Cornet (Cologne); Rhenus (Cologne); Studio 70 (Munich)
- Genres: Electronic; kosmische; ambient
- Length: 37:41
- Labels: Philips; Vertigo
- Producers: Ralf Hütter; Florian Schneider

Kraftwerk chronology
Kraftwerk 2 (1972)	Ralf & Florian (1973)	Autobahn (1974)

Alternative cover
- Cover for the UK edition

Professional ratings
Review scores
Source	Rating
AllMusic	4/5 stars
Tom Hull – on the Web	B

Ralf & Florian is the third studio album by the German electronic band Kraftwerk. It was released in October 1973 on Philips. It saw the group moving toward their signature electronic sound. It reached #160 on the US Top 200 Albums Chart in 1975.

Along with Kraftwerk's first two albums, Ralf & Florian to date has never been officially re-issued anywhere, nor has the band played any of its material live since the late '70s. However, the album remains an influential and sought-after work, and bootlegged copies were widely distributed in the 1990s on the Germanofon label. In 2008, Fact named it among the 20 greatest ambient albums ever made.

== Background ==
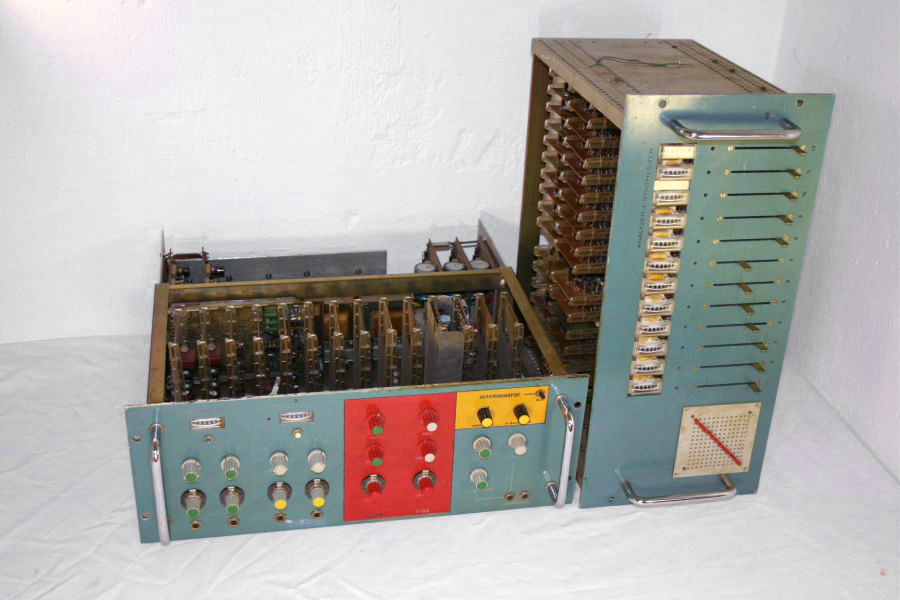
The album marked the band's first use of a machine voice, provided by this prototypical vocoder.

Rear cover, photographed by Barbara Niemöller.

As indicated by the title (and like their previous album), all the tracks were written, performed and produced by Ralf Hütter and Florian Schneider, with the sessions engineered by the influential Konrad "Conny" Plank. The album has a fuller and more polished sound quality than previous efforts, and this is clearly due to the use of a number of commercial recording studios in addition to Kraftwerk's own yet-to-be-named Kling Klang. The colour photograph on the back of the cover gives a vivid impression of the bohemian state of Kraftwerk's own facilities at the time – including egg-box trays pasted, nailed, or stuck on the walls as acoustic treatment.

Fact stated that the album's sound "sits halfway between LSD-fried Kraut prog and the refined minimal art of classic Kraftwerk." The album is still almost entirely instrumental (some wordless vocalising appears in "Tanzmusik", and "Ananas Symphonie" features the band's first use of a machine voice created by an early prototype vocoder, a sound which would later become a Kraftwerk trademark). Instrumentation begins to show more obvious use of synthesizers (Minimoog and EMS Synthi AKS), but most melodic and harmonic keyboard parts are performed on a Farfisa Professional Piano. Flute and guitar are still much in evidence. The band was still without a drummer, and several tracks, particularly "Tanzmusik", make use of a preset organ rhythm machine. "Kristallo" features a striking rhythmic electronic bassline (actually created on the EMS synthesizer with the aid of the vocoder), however, in general the album is much gentler and less rhythmically precise than Kraftwerk's later electronic work.

== Release ==
The LP included a "musicomic" poster insert of cartoons by Emil Schult, who had been playing electric violin live with the band (although he does not feature on the album recordings). Schult remained a collaborator of Kraftwerk's. The cartoons illustrated each track on the album, as well as the city of Düsseldorf, with the caption "In Düsseldorf am Rhein, klingt es bald!", which translates literally in English as "In Düsseldorf on the Rhine, it will sound soon" (perhaps the phrase "the sound gets around" captures the snappy feel of the maxim better). This is a reference to Kraftwerk's Düsseldorf-based Kling Klang studio.

The album was a modest success in Germany. Drummer Wolfgang Flür was recruited to play with Ralf and Florian for a subsequent promotional TV appearance in Berlin, for the German ZDF TV arts show Aspekte. He became a member of the group thereafter.

No material from this album has been performed in the band's live set since 1976. Though the electronic sound of Ralf & Florian is more stylistically similar to Autobahn than it is to Kraftwerk's first two albums, the band is seemingly reluctant to consider the album a part of its canon – Schneider in later interviews referred to the first three Kraftwerk albums as "archaeology". The band hinted that the album may finally see a re-mastered CD release after issuing the boxed set The Catalogue in the autumn of 2009.

== Track listing ==
All music is composed by Ralf Hütter and Florian Schneider.

Side one
No.	Title	Length
1.	"Elektrisches Roulette" ("Electric Roulette")	4:20
2.	"Tongebirge" ("Mountain of Sound")	2:50
3.	"Kristallo" ("Crystals")	6:20
4.	"Heimatklänge" ("The Bells of Home")	3:45

Side two
No.	Title	Length
5.	"Tanzmusik" ("Dance Music")	6:35
6.	"Ananas Symphonie" ("Pineapple Symphony")	13:55
Total length:		37:41

Note: The above English translations are taken from the American version of the album issued by Vertigo in 1975.

== Personnel ==
=== Kraftwerk ===
- Ralf Hütter – vocals, keyboards, organ, electronics, bass guitar, guitar, zither, drums, percussion
- Florian Schneider – vocals, keyboards, electronics, flute, violin, guitar, percussion

=== Additional personnel ===
- Emil Schult – "musicomix" poster design.
- Konrad "Conny" Plank – sound engineer.
- Barbara Niemöller – rear cover photo.
- Robert Franck – front cover photo.

== Charts ==
=== Weekly charts ===
Chart (1975)	Peak position
US Billboard 200	160
