= The Robots =

1978 song by Kraftwerk

- Cover for the original German release

Single by Kraftwerk

from the album The Man-Machine
- A-side: "Die Roboter" (German title)
- B-side: "Spacelab"
- Released: 12 May 1978
- Genre: Synth-pop
- Length: 4:20 (single edit); 3:42 (UK single edit); 6:11 (album version)
- Label: Kling Klang (EMI) 1C-006-32941 (West Germany); Capitol CL15981 (UK)
- Songwriters: Ralf Hütter; Florian Schneider; Karl Bartos
- Producers: Ralf Hütter; Florian Schneider

Kraftwerk singles chronology
"Showroom Dummies" (1977)	"The Robots" (1978)	"Das Model" (1978)

"The Robots" (German: "Die Roboter") is a single by German electronic group Kraftwerk, which was released in 1978. The single and its B-side, "Spacelab", both appeared on the band's seventh album, The Man-Machine (1978). However, the songs as they appear on the single were edited into shorter versions. It charted at number 25 in West Germany, number 39 on the US Billboard Dance Club Songs chart, and number 23 in Austria.

== Composition ==
Lyrically, the song discusses the role of robots as subservient workers to humans. The Russian lines "Я твой слуга / Я твой работник" (Ya tvoy sluga / Ya tvoy rabotnik, "I am your servant / I am your worker") (also on the rear sleeve of the album) during the intro and again during its repetition at the bridge are spoken in a pitched-down voice; the line references the Slavic origins of the word robot. The main lyrics ("We're charging our batteries, and now we're full of energy...") were produced by vocal synthesis and processed through a vocoder.

The song's refrain became a major identifying symbol for the band, and has been frequently referenced: Wolfgang Flür, a member of Kraftwerk at the time of the single's release, later wrote the book "Kraftwerk: ich war ein Roboter" (Kraftwerk: I Was a Robot in English). The lyrics were also referenced in the title of a BBC Radio 4 documentary Kraftwerk: We Are the Robots, broadcast for the first time on Thursday, 22 November 2007.

== Live performances ==
The band's performance of the song has varied significantly over time: For example, one report of a performance in 1997 describes "four legless robot bodies [being] lowered from a lighting rig and programmed to make mechanical movements to the music", another from the following year describes the spectacle as "robot torsos and heads [being] suspended in the air, slowly twisting and waving as the music plays on", and yet another describes witnessing on-screen "plastic-head representations of the band, stuck on dull gray torsos with mechanical arms and metal-rod legs". The lyrics "We are the robots" flash up on this screen, followed by the line "We are programmed / just to do / anything you want us to." The screen then lifts to reveal the band following their transformation into robots. But they are said not to move "in the popping spurts that robots are famous for; they swiveled and moved their arms slowly, thoughtfully, humanly, as if practicing t'ai chi". It has also been said that these "robots" give a far more lifelike performance than the band themselves. There was, however, "an air of farce" at one show in Ireland in 2008 when a curtain refused to close, disrupting the transformation of the band into robots. Stagehands had to intervene and close the curtain themselves, after which the sequence could continue.

== Reception ==
"The Robots" is widely regarded as one of Kraftwerk's best songs. In 2020, Billboard and The Guardian ranked the song number two and number six, respectively, on their lists of the greatest Kraftwerk songs. The song was being widely used as a curtain raiser song in many movie theaters across South India. In 2016, Billboard also ranked "The Robots" number 32 in their list of "Top 50 Weird & Funny Songs to Dance to".

== Track listing ==
1978 7-inch single

Side one
No.	Title	Length
1.	"Die Roboter"	4:20

Side two
No.	Title	Length
2.	"Spacelab"	3:34

== 1991 re-issue ==
"The Robots"

Single by Kraftwerk

from the album The Mix
- A-side: "Die Roboter" (German title)
- B-side: "Robotnik/Robotronik"
- Released: 20 May 1991
- Genre: Electronic
- Length: 3:47 (single edit); 8:58 (album version)
- Label: Kling Klang; EMI
- Songwriters: Ralf Hütter; Florian Schneider; Karl Bartos
- Producers: Ralf Hütter; Florian Schneider

Kraftwerk singles chronology
"The Telephone Call" (1987)	"The Robots" (1991)	"Radioactivity (1991 re-release)" (1991)

In 1991, a re-recorded and re-arranged version of "The Robots" was issued as a single from the band's tenth album, The Mix (1991). It charted in several European countries, reaching number 52 on the Eurochart Hot 100. A new music video was also produced to promote the single.

=== Critical reception ===
David Stubbs from Melody Maker named "The Robots" Single of the Week, stating that the remix "is still outstanding — unspoilt by a slight house adaption, it's a perfect example of Kraftwerk's exact science and deadpan wit. The first, and still the best." Pan-European magazine Music & Media wrote, "The pioneers of synthesizer pop live up to their reputation. Hi-tech for EHR." Sherman from NME said, "Whilst 'The Robots' takes on a much richer feel than before, the Vocoder fed line of We are the robots [is] gouging deeper than ever into the memory".

=== Track listing ===
1991 7-inch single

Side one
No.	Title	Length
1.	"The Robots" (single edit)	3:43

Side two
No.	Title	Length
2.	"Robotronik" (single version)	3:46

1991 12-inch single

Side one
No.	Title	Length
1.	"Robotnik" (Kling Klang Mix)	7:41

Side two
No.	Title	Length
2.	"Die Roboter" (single edit)	3:43
3.	"Robotronik" (Kling Klang Mix)	4:51

1991 CD single

No.	Title	Length
1.	"Die Roboter" (single edit)	3:43
2.	"Robotnik" (Kling Klang Mix)	7:41
3.	"Robotronik" (Kling Klang Mix)	4:51

Cassette single

Side one
No.	Title	Length
1.	"The Robots" (single edit)
2.	"Robotronik" (single version)

=== Charts ===
Chart (1991)	Peak position
Australia (ARIA)	161
Europe (Eurochart Hot 100)	52
Germany (GfK)	18
Ireland (IRMA)	26
Israel (Israeli Singles Chart)	24
Luxembourg (Radio Luxembourg)	13
UK Singles (Official Charts)	20
UK Airplay (Music Week)	60
UK Dance (Music Week)	32
UK Club Chart (Record Mirror)	76
US Hot Dance Club Play (Billboard)	42
US Hot Dance Singles Sales (Billboard)	42
