= Computer Love (Kraftwerk song) =

Single by Kraftwerk

from the album Computer World
- A-side: "The Model"
- Released: 29 June 1981; 7 December 1981 (re-release)
- Genre: Synth-pop
- Length: 3:45 (single edit); 7:15 (album version)
- Label: EMI (UK); Warner Bros. (US)
- Songwriters: Ralf Hütter; Karl Bartos; Emil Schult
- Producers: Ralf Hütter; Florian Schneider

Kraftwerk singles chronology
"Pocket Calculator" (1981)	"Computer Love" (1981)	"The Model" (1982)

"Computer Love" (German version: "Computer Liebe") is a song by the German electronic band Kraftwerk. It was released in 1981 on their eighth studio album, Computer World (1981), and as a single in the same year. In the UK, it was released with the B-side "The Model". Originally it peaked at number 36 in July before it was re-released on 7 December 1981 with "The Model" promoted to a double A-side, after which it went on to reach number one on the UK Singles Chart. The song was re-arranged and re-recorded for the band's 1991 studio album The Mix.

The melody of "Computer Love" was later interpolated in Coldplay's "Talk", taken from their third album X&Y (2005). Prior to release, lead singer Chris Martin asked Kraftwerk for approval. In 2025, Billboard magazine ranked "Computer Love" number 54 in their list of "The 100 Best Dance Songs of All Time".

== Charts ==
Chart performance for "Computer Love"
Chart (1981–1982)	Peak position
UK Singles (OCC) Double A-side with "The Model"	1
US Dance Club Songs (Billboard)	13
