= Kraftwerk 2 =

Studio album by Kraftwerk
- Released: January 1972
- Recorded: 26 September – 1 October 1971
- Studio: Star Musik (Hamburg)
- Genres: Krautrock; musique concrète; avant-garde; ambient
- Length: 42:42
- Labels: Philips; Vertigo
- Producers: Ralf Hütter; Florian Schneider; Conny Plank

Kraftwerk chronology
Kraftwerk (1970)	Kraftwerk 2 (1972)	Ralf & Florian (1973)

Professional ratings
Review scores
Source	Rating
AllMusic	4/5 stars

Kraftwerk 2 is the second studio album by German electronic band Kraftwerk, released in January 1972.

== Background and composition ==
Kraftwerk 2 was entirely written and performed by founding Kraftwerk members Ralf Hütter and Florian Schneider in late 1971, with the sessions produced by the influential Konrad "Conny" Plank. Hütter later said of the album's recording:

Nobody wanted to play with us because we did all kinds of strange things ... feedbacks and overtones and sounds and rhythms. No drummer wanted to work with us because we had these electronic gadgets.

Perhaps the least characteristic album of their output, it features no synthesizers, the instrumentation being largely electric guitar, bass guitar, flute and violin. The electronics on display generally belong to the realm of 1960s tape-based music more usually produced in academia, with heavy use of tape echo (for example the massed looping flute layers of "Strom"), and reverse and altered speed tape effects.

The lengthy, almost side-long "Klingklang" which opens the album is notable for its use of a preset organ beatbox to provide the percussion track. It starts with a clangourous Stockhausen-like metallic percussion montage and gives rise to the unmistakable Kraftwerk sound. Later, the song title also became the name of the band's own self-built studio, in Düsseldorf. "Atem" is a recording of breathing, while "Harmonika" features a tape-manipulated mouth organ.

== Release ==
The cover design, credited to Ralf and Florian, further hints at a deliberate association with conceptual art, being a repeat of the first album's pop art design – except this time fluorescent green replaces the red and the number '2' is added.

It was eventually released in the UK, combined with the first Kraftwerk album as a double LP package, by the Vertigo label in March 1973, more than a year after its German release in January 1972.

No material from this album has been performed in the band's live set since the Autobahn tour of 1975, and to date, the album has not been officially reissued. The band is seemingly reluctant to consider the album as a part of its canon; in later interviews, Schneider described the first three Kraftwerk albums as "archaeology". However, unlicensed CDs of the album have been widely available since the mid-1990s on the Germanofon and Crown labels. Kraftwerk has hinted that the album may eventually see a re-mastered CD release after its Der Katalog boxed set.

== Track listing ==
All tracks are written by Ralf Hütter and Florian Schneider-Esleben.

Side one
No.	Title	Length
1.	"Klingklang" ("Ding Dong")	17:36
2.	"Atem" ("Breath")	2:57

Side two
No.	Title	Length
3.	"Strom" ("Current")	3:52
4.	"Spule 4" ("Reel 4")	5:20
5.	"Wellenlänge" ("Wavelength")	9:40
6.	"Harmonika" ("Harmonica")	3:17
Total length:		42:42

== Personnel ==
=== Kraftwerk ===
- Ralf Hütter – organ, electric piano, guitar, bass, rhythm machine, xylophone, harmonica
- Florian Schneider-Esleben – flutes, violin, guitar, effects, xylophone

=== Additional personnel ===
- Konrad Plank – sound engineer

== Charts ==
=== Weekly charts ===
Chart (1972)	Peak position
German Albums (Offizielle Top 100)	36
