= Das Model =

1978 song by Kraftwerk

- German sleeve

Single by Kraftwerk

from the album The Man-Machine
- Language: German, English
- B-side: "Neonlicht"; "The Model"
- Released: 22 September 1978
- Genre: Synth-pop; electropop; art pop
- Length: 3:38
- Label: Kling Klang; EMI; Capitol
- Songwriters: Karl Bartos; Ralf Hütter; Emil Schult
- Producers: Ralf Hütter; Florian Schneider

Kraftwerk singles chronology
| "Die Roboter" (1978) | "Das Model" (1978) | "Neonlicht" (1978) |

Audio sample
- Kraftwerk – The Model: file; help

"The Model"
- UK sleeve

Single by Kraftwerk

from the album Computer World
- B-side: "Computer Love"
- Released: 7 December 1981
- Genre: Synth-pop; electropop; art pop
- Songwriters: Karl Bartos; Ralf Hütter; Emil Schult
- Producers: Ralf Hütter; Florian Schneider

Kraftwerk singles chronology
| "Computer Love" (1981) | "The Model" (1981) | "Showroom Dummies" (1982) |

"Das Model" ("The Model" in English) is a song recorded by the German group Kraftwerk in 1978, written by musicians Ralf Hütter and Karl Bartos, with artist Emil Schult collaborating on the lyrics. It is featured on the album, Die Mensch-Maschine (known in international versions as The Man-Machine).

In 1981, the song was re-released to coincide with the release of the studio album Computerwelt (Computer World in English). It reached no. 1 in the UK singles chart. Both the German and English versions of the song have been covered by other artists, including Snakefinger, Hikashu, Big Black.

== Background ==
The lyrics were written by Emil Schult, who was in love with a model when he wrote the song. He also composed music for the song, though it was too guitar-heavy for the musical concept of Kraftwerk and it was rewritten by Bartos and Hütter to fit the sound of the band.

As with all of the songs on The Man-Machine, The Model was released in both German- and English-language versions. The lyrics are very close between two versions, with the exception of a guttural-sounding "Korrekt!" added after the line "Sie trinkt in Nachtclubs immer Sekt" in the German version. (The English lyric is "She's going out to nightclubs, drinking just champagne.") This was an inside joke by the band. In his autobiography, I Was A Robot, former Kraftwerk member Wolfgang Flür explains:

Our favourite discothèque, the Mora, lay in the Schneider-Wibbel Gasse in the middle of Düsseldorf's old town, and there was a waiter who worked there who always greeted new guests with the words "Hallöchen! Sekt? Korrrrrrrekt!" You didn't have the chance to contradict him, because he always answered himself. He loved selling champagne to the guests, largely because it was the drink on which he earned the highest commission, and he forced it on everyone.

We'd heard him so often, and he was such a fine example of Düsseldorf chic, that we invited him into our studio when we were recording "The Model" so that he could speak his smug slogan directly into the microphone. That's why his pithy "Sekt? Korrrrrrrekt!" appears in our most famous song.

== Charts ==
| Chart (1978) | Peak position |
|---|---|
| Netherlands (Single Top 100) | 43 |
| US Dance Club Songs (Billboard) as part of The Man-Machine | 39 |

| Chart (1982) | Peak position |
|---|---|
| Australia (Kent Music Report) | 33 |
| Finland (Suomen virallinen lista) | 20 |
| Ireland (IRMA) | 4 |
| Netherlands (Single Top 100) | 41 |
| UK Singles (Official Charts) | 1 |
| West Germany (GfK) | 7 |

== Certifications and sales ==
| Region | Certification | Certified units/sales |
|---|---|---|
| United Kingdom (BPI) | Gold | 500,000^{^} |
^{^} Shipments figures based on certification alone.

== Rammstein cover ==
"Das Modell"

Single by Rammstein
- B-side: "Kokain"; "Alter Mann"
- Released: 1997
- Length: 4:46
- Label: Motor
- Songwriters: Karl Bartos; Ralf Hütter; Emil Schult
- Producers: Jacob Hellner; Rammstein

Rammstein singles chronology
| "Sehnsucht" (1997) | "Das Modell" (1997) | "Du riechst so gut '98" (1998) |

German rock band Rammstein covered the German version of "Das Model" in 1997 as "Das Modell". It was released as a non-album single. "Das Modell" is introduced by a French phrase spoken by film editor Mathilde Bonnefoy. The single contains three non-album tracks taken from the Sehnsucht recording sessions. In the special version of "Alter Mann", Bobo (Christiane Hebold) sings alongside Till Lindemann in the chorus.

=== Track listings ===
Promo CD

| No. | Title | Writer(s) | Length |
|---|---|---|---|
| 1. | "Das Modell" | Ralf Hütter, Karl Bartos, Emil Schult | 4:46 |
| 2. | "Kokain" | Rammstein | 3:09 |
| Total length: | | | 7:55 |

Enhanced CD

| No. | Title | Writer(s) | Length |
|---|---|---|---|
| 1. | "Das Modell" | Hütter, Bartos, Schult | 4:46 |
| 2. | "Kokain" | Rammstein | 3:09 |
| 3. | "Alter Mann (Special Version)" (featuring Bobo) | Rammstein | 4:22 |
| 4. | "Rammstein Computerspiel für Windows" (Rammstein computer game for Windows) | n/a | n/a |
| Total length: | | | 12:17 |

=== Charts ===
==== Weekly charts ====
| Chart (1997–1998) | Peak position |
|---|---|
| Austria (Ö3 Austria Top 40) | 18 |
| Germany (GfK) | 5 |
| Sweden (Sverigetopplistan) | 41 |

==== Year-end charts ====
| Chart (1998) | Position |
|---|---|
| Germany (Media Control) | 96 |

== See also ==
- List of UK singles chart number ones of the 1980s
