= Musique Non-Stop =

"Musique Non Stop"

Single by Kraftwerk

from the album Electric Café
- Released: 20 October 1986
- Genre: Synth-pop
- Length: 4:13 (7" version); 5:45 (album version); 6:22 (12" version)
- Label: Kling Klang; EMI; Warner Bros. Records
- Songwriters: Ralf Hütter; Florian Schneider; Karl Bartos

Kraftwerk singles chronology
"Tour de France (remix)" (1984)	"Musique Non Stop" (1986)	"The Telephone Call" (1987)

Music video
- "Musique Non-Stop" on YouTube

"Musique Non Stop" is a 1986 single by German techno group Kraftwerk, which was featured on their ninth studio album Electric Café. It was re-released as a remix on their 1991 album The Mix. The single was their first number one on Billboard Hot Dance Club Play and was one of two songs to make it to number one there.

== Background and composition ==
"Musique Non Stop"'s lyrics comprise the title of the song being repeatedly chanted by a female voice, which is the voice of the music video's animation artist Rebecca Allen, in English and a computerized male voice in French.

The single is traditionally the final act during Kraftwerk concerts. In the early 1990s, a completely different version of "Musique Non-Stop" – slower and more melodic – was used extensively as a jingle on MTV Europe. Earlier, MTV Europe had already included elements from the original song and the video in the title graphics for MTV's Greatest Hits. This version was later released in December 2020 as "Non Stop" on Remixes, a compilation released by Parlophone. Unlike the original this version is credited to be composed by Hütter and Fritz Hilpert with lyrics credited to Hütter, Schneider and Emil Schult.

== Live performances ==
After Florian Schneider left the group in 2008, the song was altered to accommodate video technician Stefan Pfaffe during performances. The song is basically the same, except shorter and the percussive/harmonic sequence that occupied Schneider's solo is operated by the other band members.

The Mix version (which was used in Minimum-Maximum) incorporates elements from fellow Electric Café songs "Boing Boom Tschak" and "Techno Pop". This was also done in Musique Non Stop's single version and music video.

== Music video ==
The video for "Musique Non-Stop" is notable in itself for showcasing a computer-animated representation of the band. Created in 1983, it sat dormant for three years before finally being incorporated as the video for the song. The animation, which was complex for its time, was created by Rebecca Allen, using state-of-the-art facial animation software developed by the New York Institute of Technology. The slow rate of the album's progress, combined with rapid changes in software animation, meant that Allen had to archive the animation program developed at the Institute of Technology until Hütter and Schneider were ready in 1986, to travel to New York to edit the images to the final version of "Musique Non-Stop". In the early hours of December 31, 2025, the music video became the last one to be aired on MTV Germany.

== Track listing ==
=== 7-inch single ===
All tracks are written by Ralf Hütter, Florian Schneider and Karl Bartos.

Side one
No.	Title	Length
1.	"Musique Non-Stop"	4:08

Side two
No.	Title	Length
1.	"Musique Non-Stop"	3:45

=== 12-inch single ===
Side one
No.	Title	Length
1.	"Musique Non-Stop"	6:15

Side two
No.	Title	Length
2.	"Musique Non-Stop (Radio edit)"	4:08

== Charts ==
=== Weekly charts ===
Chart (1986–1987)	Peak position
New Zealand (Recorded Music NZ)	45
UK Singles (OCC)	82
US Dance Club Songs (Billboard)	1
US Dance Singles Sales (Billboard)	6
West Germany (GfK)	13

=== Year-end charts ===
Chart (1987)	Position
US Dance Club Songs (Billboard)	2
US Dance Singles Sales (Billboard)	40
