= Organisation (band) =

German musical group

- Origin: Germany
- Genres: Krautrock
- Years active: 1969–1970
- Labels: RCA Victor
- Spinoffs: Kraftwerk
- Past members: Basil Hammoudi; Butch Hauf; Ralf Hütter; Alfred "Fred" Mönicks; Florian Schneider-Esleben

Organisation zur Verwirklichung gemeinsamer Musikkonzepte (German: "Organisation for the Realisation of Shared Music Concepts") was an experimental krautrock band, that was the immediate predecessor of the band Kraftwerk. In addition to the founding members of Kraftwerk, Ralf Hütter and Florian Schneider-Esleben, Organisation included Basil Hammoudi, Butch Hauf, and Fred Monicks. The band was assisted by Paul Lorenz, Peter Martini, and Charly Weiss during their career.

== History ==
A video recording by German TV broadcaster WDR exists of the band performing "Ruckzuck", a piece that appeared on the first Kraftwerk album in 1970. The performance took place at the Grugahalle in Essen on 25 April 1970 as part of the Internationales Essener Pop & Blues Festival. This was their last performance as Organisation, Hütter and Schneider-Esleben (later just Schneider) went on to form Kraftwerk, leaving Hammoudi, Hauf and Monicks to go to university.

Their only album, Tone Float, produced and engineered by Konrad "Conny" Plank along with the band themselves, was released on the RCA Victor label in the United Kingdom in 1970. As it was available in Germany only as an import, sales were poor and RCA opted to drop the band shortly afterwards, at which point Hütter and Schneider-Esleben left the band to form Kraftwerk, with Organisation dissolving as a result. Hammoudi, Hauf and Mönicks all returned to university to complete their studies. Hammoudi was later a member of jazz-rock band Ibliss, along with early Kraftwerk drummer Andreas Hohmann.

According to Mönicks (interviewed in the mid-1990s and June 2002 - January 2003.) the quintet had already begun to perform under the name Kraftwerk some time after Tone Float had been recorded, but RCA had been keen for them to have a band name more appropriate to the English market, since the album was to be issued only in the UK, so the name Organisation was used.

== Members ==
- Basil Hammoudi – glockenspiel, conga gong, musical box, bongos, percussion, vocals
- Butch Hauf – bass, shaky tube, small bells, plastic hammer, percussion
- Ralf Hütter – Hammond organ
- Alfred "Fred" Mönicks – drums, bongos, maracas, cowbell, tambourine, percussion
- Florian Schneider-Esleben – electric flute, alto flute, bell, triangle, tambourine, electro-violin, percussion

== Discography ==
- Tone Float (1970)
