= Tone Float =

Studio album by Organisation
- Released: June 1970
- Recorded: Germany
- Genre: Krautrock; avant-garde; musique concrete
- Length: 41:19
- Label: RCA
- Producer: Conny Plank & Organisation

Professional ratings
Review scores
| Source | Rating |
|---|---|
| Allmusic | 3/5 stars |

Tone Float is the only album by the German band Organisation zur Verwirklichung gemeinsamer Musikkonzepte (Organisation). Organisation included as members Ralf Hütter and Florian Schneider-Esleben, who went on to found Kraftwerk.

== Recording and release ==
The album was produced by Konrad "Conny" Plank, who later said:

The studio was in the middle of an oil refinery. When we came out of the door we could hear the sound of those big flames burning off the fumes – all kinds of industrial noises.

Sales were poor and RCA dropped the band, which dissolved following the departure of Hütter and Schneider-Esleben to form Kraftwerk.

The album has never been officially reissued, although bootleg CDs, LPs and cassettes have appeared since the 1990s. These often include a bonus track, erroneously titled "Vor dem blauen Bock", which is in fact the instrumental "Rückstoß Gondoliere", from a 22 May 1971 performance by Kraftwerk on the Bremen Beat-Club TV show. This song features the short-lived line-up of Florian Schneider, Michael Rother and Klaus Dinger, Ralf Hütter having left the group for some months to study architecture. Rother and Dinger left Kraftwerk shortly afterwards to form Neu!.

The album was unofficially rereleased in 2021 by record label Media Champ on digital services under the name Tone Float Beat-Club 1971, along with a new album cover. This release includes, and correctly names, "Rückstoß Gondoliere".

== Track listing ==
Detail from the back cover of the 1970 RCA Victor official release – note the traffic cone symbol, also a feature on early Kraftwerk albums.

All tracks are written by Schneider-Esleben, Hauf and Monicks

Side one
| No. | Title | Length |
|---|---|---|
| 1. | "Tone Float" | 20:46 |

Side two
| No. | Title | Length |
|---|---|---|
| 2. | "Milk Rock" | 5:24 |
| 3. | "Silver Forest" | 3:19 |
| 4. | "Rhythm Salad" | 4:04 |
| 5. | "Noitasinagro" | 7:46 |

== Personnel ==
- Basil Hammoudi – glockenspiel, conga gong, musical box, bongos, percussion, vocals
- Butch Hauf – bass, shaky tube, small bells, plastic hammer
- Ralf Hütter – Hammond organ, organ
- Alfred "Fred" Mönicks – drums, bongos, maracas, cowbell, tambourine
- Florian Schneider-Esleben – electric flute, alto flute, bell, triangle, tambourine, electro-violin, percussion

Additional personnel

- Konrad "Conny" Plank – sound engineering

== Release details ==
| Country | Date | Label | Format | Catalog |
|---|---|---|---|---|
| United Kingdom | June 1970 | RCA Victor | Vinyl | SF 8111 |
