= Computer World =

Studio album by Kraftwerk
- Released: 11 May 1981
- Recorded: 1979–1981
- Studio: Kling Klang (Düsseldorf)
- Genre: Synth-pop; electropop; electro
- Length: 34:25
- Label: Kling Klang; EMI Electrola
- Producer: Ralf Hütter; Florian Schneider

Kraftwerk chronology
The Man-Machine (1978)	Computer World (1981)	Electric Café (1986)

Singles from Computer World
- 1. "Pocket Calculator" Released: 21 April 1981; 2. "Computer Love" Released: 29 June 1981; 3. "Numbers / Computer Love" Released: June 1981 (US); 4. "Computerwelt" Released: 1982 (Ger.)

Computer World (German: Computerwelt) is the eighth studio album by German electronic band Kraftwerk, released on 11 May 1981. It was accompanied by four singles, including a double A-side UK no. 1 featuring "Computer Love".

The album is themed around computer technology and its rise within society. In keeping with the album's concept, Kraftwerk showcased their music on an ambitious world tour. As was the case with the two previous albums, Computer World was released in both German- and English-language editions.

== Concept and recording ==
"We live in a computer world, so we made a song about it", said Ralf Hütter. Computer World has been described as a futuristic conceptual work that predicts the presence of computer technology in everyday life. Featuring themes such as home computers and digital communication, the album has been seen as both a celebration of computer technology as well as a warning about its potential to exert power on society with social control and digital surveillance. Despite its theme, the production of the album was completely analogue and did not involve any computer technology.

== Artwork ==
The cover shows a computer terminal (apparently based on the Hazeltine 1500) displaying the heads of the four band members. The font is indicative of OCR-A.

The inner sleeve artwork, created by Emil Schult and photographed by Günter Fröhling, depicts four slightly robotic-looking mannequins (representing the band members engaged in studio activities: performing, recording, mixing), similar to the artwork of the previous album, The Man-Machine, also created by Fröhling. In two photos, the mannequin representing Karl Bartos is seen playing a Stylophone, an instrument which is featured on the track "Pocket Calculator".

== Release ==
Computer World peaked at No. 15 on the UK Albums Chart. It was certified silver by the British Phonographic Industry (BPI) on 12 February 1982 for shipments in excess of 60,000 copies.

The track "Computer Love" was released as a seven-inch single in the UK in June 1981, backed with "The Model", from the group's previous album The Man-Machine. The single reached No. 36 in the charts. In December 1981 the two songs were reissued as a double A-side twelve-inch single, and reached No. 1 on the UK Singles Chart in early February 1982, although "The Model" received the most airplay.

"Pocket Calculator" was released as a seven-inch single in the USA by Warner Brothers in 1981, pressed on a fluorescent yellow/lime vinyl matching the color of the album cover. The flip side featured the Japanese version of "Pocket Calculator", "Dentaku". "Pocket Calculator" charted at No. 38 in the UK Singles Chart.

"Computerwelt" was remixed in 1982 as a dance version with additional bass and percussion sounds. It was released in January 1982 as a twelve-inch vinyl single only in Germany. The original track was nominated for a Grammy Award for Best Rock Instrumental Performance in 1982. "Computer World" was also chosen by the BBC for use in the titles of their UK computer literacy project, The Computer Programme.

Kraftwerk issued several different versions of the single "Pocket Calculator" in different languages: namely, German ("Taschenrechner"), French ("Mini Calculateur"), and Japanese ("Dentaku", or 電卓). An Italian version ("Mini Calcolatore") was also performed live on the music TV show Discoring.

== Critical reception ==
Professional ratings
Review scores
Source	Rating
AllMusic	4.5/5 stars
Drowned in Sound	10/10
Encyclopedia of Popular Music	4/5 stars
The Guardian	4/4 stars
Mojo	4/5 stars
Q	5/5 stars
The Rolling Stone Album Guide	3/5 stars
Select	4/5
Uncut	5/5 stars
The Village Voice	B

Computer World was ranked the second best album of 1981 by NME. But some contemporary critics were unimpressed. Smash Hits reviewer David Hepworth described the content as "predictable" and "gimmicky" and not the presumed step forward by the group: "Kraftwerk are seemingly content to tootle around on their instrument panels in the service of a bunch of non-songs about pocket calculators and computers", Hepworth wrote, giving the album a 4 out of 10 rating.

Retrospectively, Computer World has frequently appeared in numerous 'Best'-listings. In 2012, Slant Magazine placed it at No. 25 on its list of the 100 best albums of the 1980s. In 2018, Computer World was listed by Pitchfork as the 18th best album of the 1980s. Pitchfork listed the track "Computer Love" as the 53rd best song of the 1980s. Rolling Stone named Computer World the 10th greatest EDM album of all time in 2012.

== 1981 Computer World tour ==
Following the release of the Computer World album, Kraftwerk went on a subsequent tour, that started on 24 May 1981 and ended on 14 December 1981.

== Legacy ==
Computer World maintains a distinct influence over subsequent releases across a multitude of genres; this influence is particularly noticeable in early and contemporary hip-hop and rap.

In 1982, American DJ and rapper Afrika Bambaataa wrote the song "Planet Rock" and recorded chords inspired from Trans-Europe Express. The song's lyrics also included the Japanese number counting "Ichi Ni San Shi" from Kraftwerk's "Numbers".

Cybotron's 1983 release "Clear", from the album Enter, contains multiple auditory elements of Computer World: the musical refrain closely resembles parts of "Home Computer" and "It's More Fun to Compute"; additionally, the track contains musical allusions to other Kraftwerk tracks.

Señor Coconut y su Conjunto, an electronic project of German musician Uwe Schmidt which initially covered Kraftwerk's songs, published a merengue-styled version of "It's More Fun to Compute" on their first LP El Baile Alemán, wrongly labeled as "Homecomputer" on the sleeve.

Coldplay used the main riff from "Computer Love" in their song "Talk" from their 2005 album X&Y. "Lugom-IX" from Ricardo Villalobos's 2006 album Salvador prominently uses the riff from "Computer World".

Fergie's track "Fergalicious", from her 2006 debut album The Dutchess, borrows heavily from two tracks on Computer World: the opening synth line from "It's More Fun to Compute", as well as the rhythmic component of J.J. Fad's "Supersonic", as the latter track's beat is based upon the Computer World track "Numbers". Arabian Prince, the co-producer of "Supersonic", has been vocal about his admiration of Kraftwerk.

La Roux used the main riff from "Computer Love" in their 2009 song "I'm Not Your Toy" from their self-titled debut album. "Home Computer" is used as background music in the Young Sheldon episode "A Computer, a Plastic Pony, and a Case of Beer".

LCD Soundsystem took "Home Computer" throughout the track Disco Infiltrator.

DJ Hooligan (Da Hool) sampled The Mix version of "Home Computer" for the Underground and Cursed remix of the song "Scatman's World" by Scatman John.

Beck took sounds from it and played "Home Computer" live.

Neil Young's 1983 electronic album Trans was influenced by Computer World.

Ulf Ekberg of Ace of Base, when asked what brought him to music, if he had to boil it down to one reason, responded with: "In one word: Kraftwerk. Once Kraftwerk released their 1981 album Computerwelt it all became clear to me: they showed the world that you can combine music with technology and be successful with it — and that was exactly what I wanted to do."

== Track listing ==
Side one
No.	Title	Lyrics	Music	Length
1.	"Computer World" ("Computerwelt")	Ralf Hütter; Florian Schneider; Emil Schult	Hütter; Karl Bartos	5:05
2.	"Pocket Calculator" ("Taschenrechner")	Hütter; Schult	Hütter; Bartos	4:55
3.	"Numbers" ("Nummern")		Hütter; Schneider; Bartos	3:19
4.	"Computer World 2" ("Computerwelt 2")		Hütter; Schneider; Bartos	3:21

Side two
No.	Title	Lyrics	Music	Length
5.	"Computer Love" ("Computer Liebe")	Hütter; Schult	Hütter; Bartos	7:15
6.	"Home Computer" ("Heimcomputer")	Schneider	Hütter; Schneider; Bartos	6:17
7.	"It's More Fun to Compute"		Hütter; Schneider; Bartos	4:13
Total length:				34:25

- The German Version of "Computer World 2" is 12 seconds shorter and contains a different mix from the 2:30 minute mark.

== Personnel ==
The original 1981 sleeve notes are relatively unspecific regarding roles, merely listing all the equipment suppliers and technicians under the heading "Hardware" and the various other people involved, such as photographers, as "Software". By contrast, the 2009 remastered edition notes list the performer credits as the following:

=== Kraftwerk ===
- Ralf Hütter – voice, vocoder, synthesizer, keyboards, Orchestron, Synthanorma Sequenzer, electronics, software
- Florian Schneider – vocoder, speech synthesis, synthesizer, electronics, software
- Karl Bartos – electronic drums, software
- Wolfgang Flür – software

=== Technical ===
- Ralf Hütter – mixing, cover, original artwork reconstruction, album concept, production
- Florian Schneider – mixing, cover, album concept, production
- Peter Bollis – hardware
- Hermann J. Poertner – hardware
- Gerd Rothe – hardware
- Pit Franke – software
- Karl Klefisch – software
- Falk Kübler – software
- Takeshi Shikura – software
- Martin Tewis – software
- Carol Martin – software
- Tom Lanik – software
- Doreen D'Agostino – software
- Marvin Katz – software
- Bob Krasnow – software
- Günter Spachtholz – software
- Joachim Dehmann – software
- Emil Schult – cover
- Günter Fröhling – photos
- Johann Zambryski – original artwork reconstruction

== Charts ==
=== Weekly charts ===
Weekly chart performance for Computer World
Chart (1981)	Peak position
Australian Albums (Kent Music Report)	51
Austrian Albums (Ö3 Austria)	14
German Albums (Offizielle Top 100)	7
New Zealand Albums (RMNZ)	28
Swedish Albums (Sverigetopplistan)	27
UK Albums (OCC)	15
US Billboard 200	72
US Top R&B/Hip-Hop Albums (Billboard)	32

=== Year-end charts ===
Year-end chart performance for Computer World
Chart (1981)	Position
German Albums (Offizielle Top 100)	47

== Certifications ==
Certifications for Computer World
Region	Certification	Certified units/sales
United Kingdom (BPI)	Silver	60,000^{^}
^{^} Shipments figures based on certification alone.
