= Technopop (disambiguation) =

Technopop is another term for the musical genre known as synth-pop.

Technopop may also refer to:

- "Technopop", a song by the Buggles from the 1980 album The Age of Plastic
- Techno Pop, a working title (later re-release title) for the 1986 album Electric Café by Kraftwerk
  - "Techno Pop", a song by Kraftwerk from the 1986 album Electric Café
