= Autobahn (album) =

Studio album by Kraftwerk
- Released: November 1974
- Studios: Kling Klang (Düsseldorf); Conny's Studio (Cologne)
- Genres: Electropop; electroacoustic; kosmische
- Length: 42:27
- Language: German
- Label: Philips
- Producers: Florian Schneider; Ralf Hütter

Kraftwerk chronology
| Ralf & Florian (1973) | Autobahn (1974) | Exceller 8 (1975) |

Alternative cover
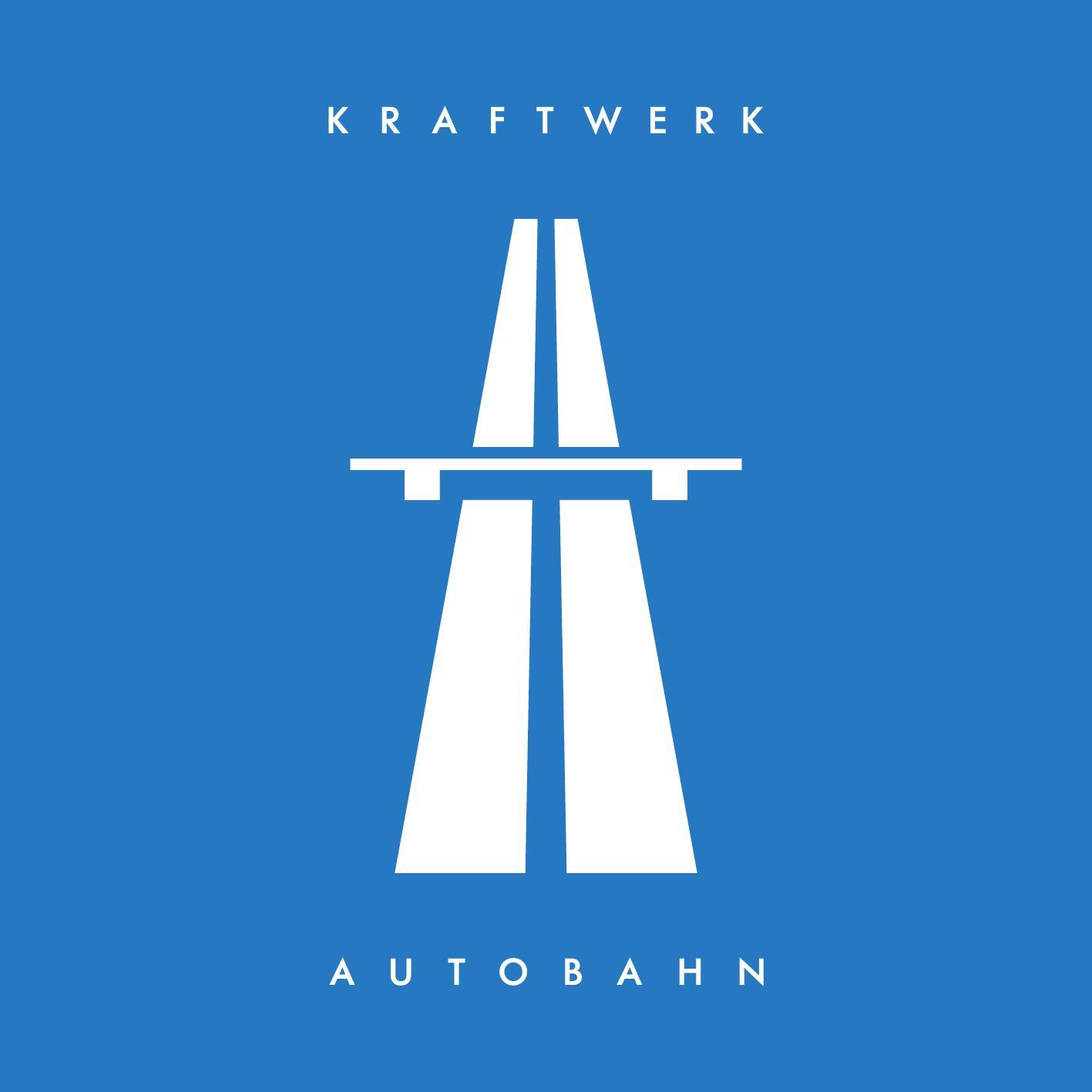
- 2009 remastered edition

Singles from Autobahn
- 1. "Autobahn" Released: February 1975; 2. "Kometenmelodie 2" Released: July 1975

Autobahn is the fourth studio album by German electronic music band Kraftwerk, released in November 1974 by Philips Records. The album marked several personnel changes in the band, which was initially a duo consisting of Florian Schneider and Ralf Hütter; later, the group added Klaus Röder on guitar and flute, and Wolfgang Flür on percussion. The album also completed the group's transition from the experimental krautrock style of their earlier work to an electropop sound consisting mostly of synthesizers and drum machines. Recording started at the group's own Kling Klang facility, but was predominantly made at Conny Plank's studio. Autobahn also includes lyrics and a new look for the group that was suggested by Emil Schult, an associate of Schneider and Hütter.

Most of the album is taken up by the 22-minute "Autobahn", featuring lyrics by Schneider, Hütter, and Schult. The song was inspired by the group's joy of driving on Germany's autobahns, and recorded music that reflected a trip emulating the sounds of a vehicle. The album's release in West Germany saw little press attention. "Autobahn" was released as a single and received airplay at a Chicago radio station, leading it to spread across the United States. In 1975, the song became an international hit and Kraftwerk's first release of their music in the US. "Autobahn"'s success led to the band touring the United States with new member Karl Bartos, who replaced Röder, followed by a tour of the United Kingdom.

Initial reception to Autobahn was mixed; receiving negative reviews, from Rolling Stone and Village Voice, who felt the music was inferior to earlier music from Wendy Carlos and Mike Oldfield, and positive reviews that praised the title track as hypnotic and arresting for its imagery of driving on the autobahn. Critics from the Fort Worth Star-Telegram and Newsday included the album in their "Honorable Mentions" sections of their year-end lists. Retrospectively, the album has been unanimously praised; Simon Witter wrote in NME the album is of "enormous historical significance" and Simon Reynolds said the album is where Kraftwerk's music really starts to matter. Musicians of the 1970s and 1980s, including David Bowie, cited the album as a major influence.

== Background and production ==
Prior to the release of Autobahn, Kraftwerk consisted of Florian Schneider and Ralf Hütter, who had released an album titled Ralf & Florian in October 1973. Prior to Autobahn, electronic music did not develop a popular following in the United States with a few exceptions such as the works of fellow German band Tangerine Dream. According to critic Lynn Van Matre of the Chicago Tribune in 1975, "far too often much of what has been profferred has been either boring, painfully self-indulgent, or just plain painful". In comparison, Van Matre found "Autobahn" to be "what you might call middle-of-the-road electronics". Comparing the album's sounds to the group's earlier work, Michael Hooker of the Los Angeles Times noted the music of Ralf & Florian is more traditional compared to that of Autobahn, noting its resemblance to the works of composers Morton Subotnik and Edgar Froese rather than the "monotonous pulse" of Autobahn. Kraftwerk became more conscious of their visual image and, under the guidance of their associate Emil Schult, they began redesigning their look. Schult, who had studied under Joseph Beuys, consulted the band on their themes and image. This led to Kraftwerk having small, carefully staged promotional images for the rest of their career. In a 1975 interview published in Melody Maker, Karl Dallas noted Kraftwerk's music and look were "as far as you get from the Gothic romanticism of Tangerine Dream" and that "visually they also present a completely different image", comparing Tangerine Dream's Froese's "untidy red locks", and bandmates Peter Baumann's and Christopher Franke's "long, lank tresses".

In early 1974, like their German contemporaries, Kraftwerk purchased a Minimoog synthesizer, which they used alongside customized versions of the Farfisa Rhythm Unit 10 and Vox Percussion King drum machines on the album. Autobahn was recorded at the group's home studio Kling Klang and at Conny Plank's new studio in a farmhouse outside Cologne. The majority of Autobahn was made on Plank's equipment. Accompanying Schneider and Hütter on the album are Klaus Roeder on violin and guitar, and Wolfgang Flür on percussion. Roeder, who was a member of Düsseldorf's music scene, had built an electronic violin that intrigued Schneider. Flür was an interior design student who had drummed for a Düsseldorf band called The Beathovens. Flür stated he found initial jam sessions with the group somewhat strange but soon developed a rapport with his bandmates. Conny Plank is credited as the engineer on the album but he had a key contribution to its sound. Roeder later stated: "Plank played a decisive role. He mixed everything and assembled individual sounds into a whole. That was, I believe the last time that Conny did that. He then told me he did know what Kraftwerk would sound like when he was no longer there."

== Music ==
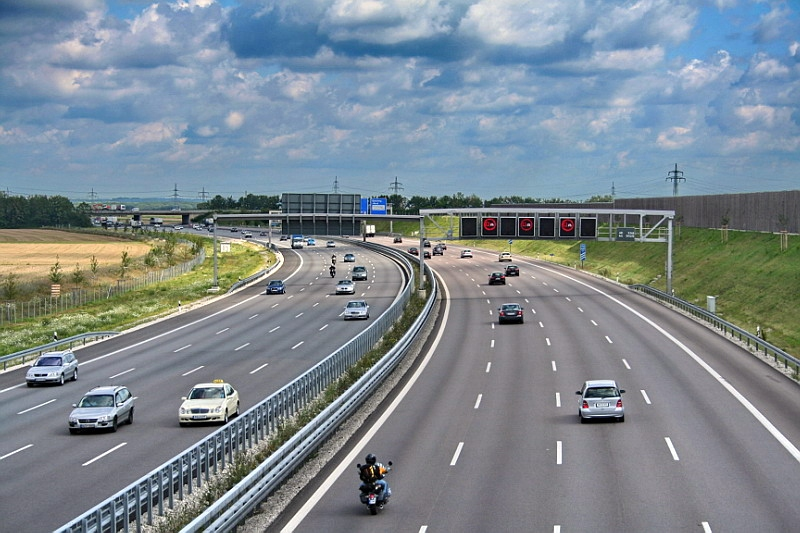
The Autobahn in Germany in 2007. Ralf Hütter stated the album was influenced by the excitement of driving on the autobahn.

In the book Kraftwerk: Music Non-Stop, Carsten Brocker said that with Autobahn, Kraftwerk completed the transition from their earlier style of experimental krautrock to electropop music. The album was recorded primarily on synthesizer and drum machine, with occasional flute and guitar. Brocker commented on the group's simple melodies and harmonies suggest pop music. According to Bartos, the group's change in style occurred because Hütter and Schneider came from a classical music background, and they moved to pop music by adding lyrics because "There is no pop music without lyrics apparently". The change in musical direction was influenced by Schult, who was not trained as a musician but has an ear for melody and chose effective parts of improvised sessions, and led Hütter and Schneider to explore by simplifying their own musical sessions. There are very few vocals on Autobahn; critic Van Matre described the album as "simply an impression of the sounds and sensory perceptions of the road".

Hütter repeatedly described Kraftwerk's music as Industrielle Volksmusik (lit. 'industrial folk music'), specifically referencing a modern version of German regional musical traditions rather than the industrial music sound of groups like Throbbing Gristle. In Britain, electronic music was popularly known as "Doctor Who music", referencing the pioneering electronic soundtrack to the television series. Hütter stated in 1975 Kraftwerk got the idea for the album by driving on the autobahn, stating it was an "exciting experience that makes you run through a huge variety of feelings. We tried to convey through music what it felt like." Flür later described "Autobahn" as a journey from Düsseldorf to Hamburg and said that the route included musical pieces such as the industrial sounds of the Ruhr valley, the conveyor belts of the mining towns such as Bottrop and Castrop-Rauxel, and the rural Münster region, which is symbolized by the flute in the song. Other sounds of road travel are heard throughout the song; according to Hütter, the group included "car sounds, horns, basic melodies and tuning motors. Adjusting the suspension and tyre pressure, rolling on the asphalt, that gliding sound—phhhwwtphhhwwt—when the wheels go onto those painted stripes. It's sound poetry, and also very dynamic."

"Autobahn" was co-written by Schult, whom Hütter asked to write some lyrics. The song's lyrics are in German; Schneider reflected on this, stating: "Part of our music is derived from the feeling of our language ... our method of speaking is interrupted, hard-edged if you want; a lot of consonants and noises". According to Hütter, their language was used like a musical instrument; he said: "we are not singers in the sense of Rod Stewart, we use our voices as another instrument. Language is just another pattern of rhythm, it is one part of our unified sound." In a 1991 interview, Hütter stated that there was no expectations for the release of Autobahn, and that "We played it to our friends, and a few of them said 'Fahren auf der Autobahn!? You've gone crazy!'. We just put records out and see what happens, otherwise we'd end up over-calculating this or that." The album's four other tracks are shorter electro-acoustic pieces. "Kometenmelodie" ("Comet Melody") was inspired by Comet Kohoutek, which passed by Earth in 1973. Hütter said "Morgenspaziergang" ("Morning Walk") was influenced by the group's early morning walk when leaving their studio after late-night sessions, when they observed the silence of their surroundings. The two-part "Kometenmelodie" was described as "post-psychedelic kosmische" by Chris Power in Drowned in Sound.

== Release ==
Autobahn was released in Germany in November 1974 by Philips Records as the third of the group's three-album deal with the label. The album was released in the United States in January 1975, and the group's first album to be released in the US. Autobahn charted in the US for 22 weeks on Billboard's Top LPs and Tapes chart and peaked at number 5 on 3 May 1975. In the UK, the album was released by Phonogram with a blue-and-white motorway logo rather than Schult's painted cover. The UK cover became the default sleeve on later reissues. Autobahn was digitally remastered for released on CD, LP and cassette in 1985. In 2009, Kraftwerk remastered and released eight of their albums, including Autobahn, as part of a compilation called The Catalogue. In 2025 a 50th anniversary blu-ray edition was released.

A Chicago radio station was the first to play the single release of "Autobahn", which it had received as an import. Jem Records in New Jersey imported a large quantity of the studio album, leading Vertigo Records to release both the single and the album in the US. The single cut of "Autobahn" became an international hit song in early 1975; only a small portion of the song was played on top-40 radio. The single version of "Autobahn" is three-and-a-half minutes long; Hütter stated cutting down the track was simple because it was "loosely constructed, so making a short version was easy because you don't have to worry so much about boundaries and continuity". Following the popularity of Autobahn in the US, Vertigo also released Kraftwerk's earlier album Ralf and Florian (1973). Philips released "Kometenmelodie 2" as the album's second single.

=== Tour ===
At the end of 1974, Kraftwerk had a short tour in West Germany; where the group remained a quartet, retaining Wolfgang Flür and hiring Karl Bartos, who replaced Roeder in the group. Bartos was a 22-year old music student at Robert Schumann Hochschule, Düsseldorf, who was hoping to become a percussionist with the Berlin Symphony Orchestra. Bartos had played percussion at concerts in Germany with works by Karlheinz Stockhausen and Mauricio Kagel. Kraftwerk toured the US for three months, starting in April 1975. The US tour was followed by a seventeen-date tour of the UK in September. Bartos noted poor ticket sales for the British shows, recalling the group played to mostly empty halls in Newcastle-upon-Tyne, London, Bournemouth, Bath, Cardiff, Birmingham, and Liverpool.

During the tour, the material consisted mostly of music from Autobahn and some of their earlier material. The group had difficulties with their initial road crew, who were fired and replaced during the American tour. Issues also arose with the group's equipment; synthesizers had to be turned on in the afternoon to be tuned for the evening, and lighting from rigs was strong enough to put the instruments out of tune. They also experienced problems with the differences in mains voltages between countries.

== Reception ==
=== Contemporaneous reviews ===
Contemporary ratings
Review scores
| Source | Rating |
|---|---|
| The Village Voice | C+ |

According to Kraftwerk biographer Uwe Schütte, on its initial release in Germany, Autobahn was generally ignored by the mainstream German music press. The group invited members of the German rock press to drive with them and played "Autobahn" from the car's speakers. Schult recalled the general response from these journalists was an emphatic "So what!" The only major publication that covered the album was the November 1974 issue of German magazine Sounds, in which reviewer Hans-Joachim Krüger called the album "varied, and above all entertaining jaunt which particularly impresses listeners wearing headphones". In a review of a later Kraftwerk album, a reviewer credited as "N.N." said of Autobahn, "[S]omething like that doesn't even deserve to be released". Flür said of the album's initial critical reception: "In Germany, artists are often not well regarded unless they've scored great achievements abroad" and "Our success in the US finally brought good headlines in the German newspapers".

In 2013, Jude Rogers of The Observer called some English-language responses to the album xenophobic. Rogers cited examples such as Barry Miles' live review of the band that was titled "This is what your fathers fought to save you from", and an interview between Hütter and Lester Bangs in which Bangs asked if Kraftwerk were "the final solution" for music. When the NME printed Bangs' interview, a photograph of the group was superimposed over an image of a Nuremberg rally. Among contemporaneous reviews, John Mendelsohn of Rolling Stone gave the album a negative review, finding it not as good as the music of Wendy Carlos, who "hasn't been in the Top Ten in months and months". Village Voice critic Robert Christgau gave the album a C+ rating, comparing it with the music of Mike Oldfield but said it was made "for unmitigated simpletons, sort of, and yet in my mitigated way I don't entirely disapprove".

Bill Provick of the Ottawa Citizen was initially hesitant about the group, stating he mocked Autobahn at first, but upon listening to it and Ralf and Florian, he called his initial reaction "a bad mistake, a grave injustice and a sad example of the rock snobbery I always bemoan in others". Provick said the album "works on two levels – as pleasing background atmosphere" and "upon closer listening as lovely escape route for the mind", finding "Kraftwerk opting for calm competence rather than spectacular gimmickry – a nice change in the world of electronic music". Gary Deane of The Leader-Post said Autobahn was Kraftwerk's "most ambitious and coherent [album] to date", and that the track "Autobahn" is repetitive due to its running time but added: "the effect is deliberate and the periodic familiarly of the Autobahn's scenery keeps the work together as a whole. It's really quite fascinating and offers a new dimension to most our musical lives." Van Matre described the title track as "an impression of the sounds and sensory perceptions of the road, at times nerve-wracking, at times as repetitious as the center dividing strip, but chiefly hypnotic"; and called the track "by far the finest and most accessible thing on the album". Van Matre also said the remaining tracks on the album are "more experimental, less catchy – but it makes the whole thing worthwhile". Some critics such as Gerry Baker of Fort Worth Star-Telegram and Wayne Robins of Newsday included the album in their honorable mentions on their lists of the best albums of 1975.

=== Retrospective reviews ===
Retrospective ratings
Review scores
| Source | Rating |
|---|---|
| AllMusic | 5/5 stars |
| Drowned in Sound | 9/10 |
| The Irish Times | 4/5 stars |
| Mojo | (2009) (2025) |
| The New Rolling Stone Album Guide | 3.5/5 stars |
| Spin Alternative Record Guide | 9/10 |
| Uncut | 5/5 stars |

In 1985, Simon Witter wrote in the NME Autobahn is not as strong as Kraftwerk's four subsequent albums but that it has "enormous historical significance". Witter said: "In the glam era of glitter and guitars, Kraftwerk were four besuited squares playing keyboards", and that the group was "Mentally and sonically decades ahead of their contemporaries", noting their unique rhythms, textures and melodies. Simon Reynolds wrote in the Spin Alternative Record Guide (1995): "Esoterics will claim they prefer the first three albums: they're excellent, but truthfully Autobahn is when Kraftwerk's muzak-of-the-sphere starts to matter". Reynolds said the title track "sounds like a pastoral symphony, even as it hymns the exhilaration of cruising down the freeway".

David Cavanagh gave the 2009 remaster of Autobahn a five-star rating in Uncut, saying the title track is its main attraction and called the tracks "freckled with warmth: sunny vocal harmonies ("...mit Glitzerstrahl"), a carefree flute solo (Schneider) and clever modulations (denoting gear-changes) to break the tension", Cavanagh called the remastering of the album a fiasco, and said it is worse than the compact discs previously released by EMI. Mat Snow wrote in Mojo the album is a "pop landmark" and a "blueprint for their entire enterprise". Tom Ewing of Pitchfork commented positively on the album in their review of The Catalogue, noting tracks on the album are a showcase for Kraftwerk's "gift for simple, wistful melodies" but said the themes explored on the album were done better on Trans-Europe Express. Other later album reviews, such as a four-star rating from The Irish Times and a three-and-a-half star rating in The New Rolling Stone Album Guide, were generally positive with no specific details on Autobahn Christgau upgraded his initial ranking of C+ for Autobahn to a B−. In the 2005 book 1001 Albums You Must Hear Before You Die, Stephen Dalton called Autobahn "...a landmark in avant-garde pop minimalism".

== Legacy ==
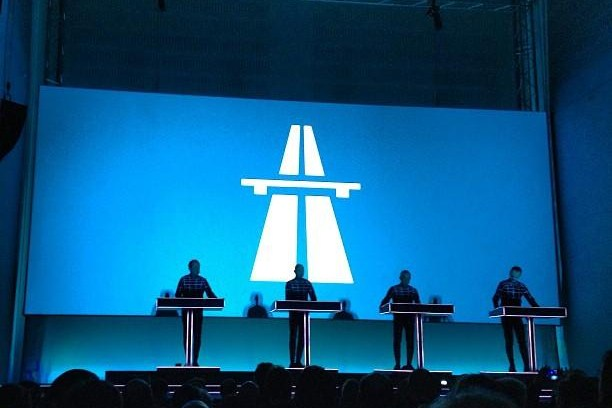
Kraftwerk performing "Autobahn" in 2013

Kraftwerk later signed with EMI to establish the Kling Klang company. This worldwide licensing deal placed them with Electrola for Germany, Austria and Switzerland, EMI in the United Kingdom, Vertigo in the United States and Pathé-Marconi in France. Kraftwerk followed-up Autobahn with Radio-Activity, which was released in 1975. Kraftwerk did not repeat the high sales of Autobahn on any subsequent album in the 1970s but were one of the most commercially successful groups in their style, selling well throughout Europe. Hütter and Schneider later dismissed Kraftwerk's earlier music; according to Hütter, Autobahn was "really the first", and Schneider called the earlier music "history, archaeology". Autobahn was Conny Plank's final work with Kraftwerk. At the home studio where he worked on Autobahn, Plank later worked with groups and artists such as Killing Joke, Clannad, Brian Eno, The Eurythmics and Devo, as well as German groups such as Neu! and DAF.

In his review of Sequencer (1976) by Synergy, critic Michael Hooker noted the increasing interest in synthesizer composition since the release of Autobahn. Other artists, such as David Bowie, began noting Autobahn as an influence. Bowie said: "the preponderance of electronic instruments convinced me that this was an area that I had to investigate a little further". Michael Rother stated Autobahn had an impact on his band Harmonia, and led him to starting thinking about adding voices on tracks; he said: "on Harmonia's Deluxe you can hear an echo of that". Producer Arthur Baker first heard Kraftwerk's "Autobahn" when working at record store in high school; he later used a medley of the group's songs for "Planet Rock" for Afrika Bambaataa.

According to Patrick Codenys of the band Front 242, in the early 1970s most "creative groups, were virtuosos like King Crimson and Yes whose music was based around sophisticated jam sessions. When I bought Autobahn I had the feeling that it was changing. For the first time, it was music that was impossible to touch – not being made up with the usual components of rock." Codenys said the music was made by only one person, which helped encourage him to make music on his own. Music critic Simon Frith stated disco heralded the future of music, and said "Autobahn" was the bridge between five minutes of unchanging rhythms of AM radio and the 24-hour concerts by avant-garde musicians like Terry Riley. Author Thomas Jerome Seabrook named the album among the "finest kosmische records." In 2014, it was inducted into the Grammy Hall of Fame, a diverse collection to represent historically significant recordings that reflect the changing climate of music through the decades.

== Track listing ==
All tracks are written by Ralf Hütter & Florian Schneider

Side A
| No. | Title | Length |
|---|---|---|
| 1. | "Autobahn" | 22:47 |

Side B
| No. | Title | Length |
|---|---|---|
| 2. | "Kometenmelodie 1" ("Comet Melody 1") | 6:26 |
| 3. | "Kometenmelodie 2" ("Comet Melody 2") | 5:47 |
| 4. | "Mitternacht" ("Midnight") | 3:45 |
| 5. | "Morgenspaziergang" ("Morning Walk") | 4:02 |
| Total length: | | 42:48 |

=== Re-issue ===
A remastered edition of Autobahn was released on CD, digital download and heavyweight vinyl in October–November 2009. The beginning of Kometenmelodie 2 was moved to the end of Kometenmelodie 1.

| No. | Title | Length |
|---|---|---|
| 1. | "Autobahn" | 22:47 |
| 2. | "Kometenmelodie 1" ("Comet Melody 1") | 6:41 |
| 3. | "Kometenmelodie 2" ("Comet Melody 2") | 5:31 |
| 4. | "Mitternacht" ("Midnight") | 3:45 |
| 5. | "Morgenspaziergang" ("Morning Walk") | 4:02 |
| Total length: | | 42:48 |

== Credits ==
Credits adapted from the original album label.

=== Kraftwerk ===
- Ralf Hütter – vocals, electronics, music, concept, production
- Florian Schneider – vocals, electronics, music, concept, production
- Wolfgang Flür – percussion
- Klaus Röder – violin, guitar

=== Additional personnel ===
- Konrad Plank – engineer
- Emil Schult – Cover painting
- Barbara Niemoller – photography

The 1985 re-release added:

- Klaus Röder – electric violin on "Mitternacht"

The 2009 remaster contained further changes and additions:

- Ralf Hütter – voice, electronics, synthesizer, organ, piano, guitar, electronic drums, artwork reconstruction.
- Florian Schneider – voice, vocoder, electronics, synthesizer, flute, electronic drums
- Wolfgang Flür – electronic drums on "Kometenmelodie 1–2"
- Klaus Röder – electric violin on "Mitternacht"
- Johann Zambryski – artwork reconstruction

== Charts ==
=== Weekly charts ===
| Chart (1974–1975) | Peak position |
|---|---|
| Australian Albums (Kent Music Report) | 9 |
| Canada Top Albums/CDs (RPM) | 5 |
| German Albums (Offizielle Top 100) | 7 |
| Dutch Albums (Album Top 100) | 11 |
| New Zealand Albums (RMNZ) | 7 |
| UK Albums (Official Charts) | 4 |
| US Billboard 200 | 5 |

| Chart (1985) | Peak position |
|---|---|
| Swedish Albums (Sverigetopplistan) | 27 |

| Chart (2020–2026) | Peak position |
|---|---|
| Austrian Albums (Ö3 Austria) | 35 |
| German Albums (Offizielle Top 100) | 8 |
| Hungarian Albums (MAHASZ) | 35 |
| Japanese Dance & Soul Albums (Oricon) | 13 |
| Scottish Albums (Official Charts) | 11 |
| Swiss Albums (Schweizer Hitparade) | 77 |
| UK Progressive Albums (Official Charts) | 3 |

== Certifications ==
| Region | Certification | Certified units/sales |
|---|---|---|
| France (SNEP) | Gold | 100,000^{*} |
| United Kingdom (BPI) | Silver | 60,000^{^} |
^{*} Sales figures based on certification alone.^{^} Shipments figures based on certification alone.

=== Year-end charts ===
| Chart (1975) | Position |
|---|---|
| Canadian Albums (RPM Top 100) | 35 |
| German Albums (Offizielle Top 100) | 18 |
| US Billboard 200 | 84 |
