= Ibliss =

1970s German band

Ibliss were a progressive / Krautrock / jazz fusion band from the Rhineland in Germany. Founded as a quintet in 1971 by former members of Kraftwerk and its predecessor Organisation, they recorded one album in Hamburg—with notable Krautrock producer Conny Plank. The group disbanded in 1973.

== Members ==
- Andreas Homann (drums, percussion)
- Basil Hammoudi (percussion, flute, vocals)
- Norbert Buellmeyer (bass guitar, percussion)
- Rainer Buechel (saxophone, flute)
- Wolfgang Buellmeyer (guitar, percussion)

== Discography ==
- Supernova (1972 LP)
