= Electric Café =

1986 studio album by Kraftwerk

Studio album by Kraftwerk
- Released: 27 October 1986
- Recorded: 1982–1986
- Studio: Kling Klang (Düsseldorf)
- Genres: Techno; synth-pop; electro
- Length: 35:38
- Labels: Kling Klang; EMI
- Producers: Ralf Hütter; Florian Schneider; Karl Bartos

Kraftwerk chronology
Computer World (1981)	Electric Café (1986)	The Mix (1991)

Singles from Electric Café
- 1. "Musique Non-Stop" Released: October 1986; 2. "The Telephone Call" Released: February 1987

Electric Café is the ninth studio album by German electronic band Kraftwerk, released on 27 October 1986. The initial 1986 release came in versions sung in English and German, as well as a limited Edición Española release, featuring versions of "Techno Pop" and "Sex Object" with only Spanish lyrics. It was the first Kraftwerk LP to be created using predominantly digital musical instruments, although the finished product was still recorded onto analog master tapes.

On 2 October 2009, the album was remastered and re-released under its original working title, Techno Pop.

== Background and development ==
The development of the album began in early 1982 (with the working titles of Technicolor and then Techno Pop), but the project was delayed because Ralf Hütter suffered a cycling accident in May or June 1982.

EMI Records announced a release date for the Techno Pop album. Promotional advertisements were released and official catalog numbers were assigned to the project. "We were working on an album concept, Technopop, but the composition was developed and we just changed the titles", Hütter explained. "It became Electric Café. But somebody within the record company went out and did a pre-order, we were working on the sleeve and some marketing idiot did this".

At various times, Hütter, Bartos, Flür and Schneider have each stated in interviews that there are no unreleased songs from this period, and that all of the original Technicolor and Techno Pop material was eventually reworked into what can be heard on the finished Electric Café album. Hütter commented "We don't spend our time on making 20 versions of a song only to leave 19 in the closet. We work target related. What we are starting we release. Our storage is empty."

== Composition ==
A tentative image from Rebecca Allen's site, which displays the original Techno Pop title

The first side of the album is divided into three tracks, which form a suite of three variations with recurring elements. (For instance, a few bars of melody from "Musique Non-Stop" can be heard as a few bars of bass melody in "Techno Pop"). It is primarily instrumental, utilizing the track titles and other phrases in a spoken manner, as opposed to sung, narrative lyrics. The songs "Techno Pop" and "Sex Object" feature partial Spanish-language lyrics. The second side also contains three songs, following a somewhat more conventional pop format.

The song "The Telephone Call" (German version: "Der Telefon-Anruf") is notable for being the only Kraftwerk song to feature Karl Bartos on lead vocals. The album closes with the title track "Electric Café", which features French and partially Italian-language lyrics. The track gained some exposure in the United States when it was used slightly sped up as the theme song for "Sprockets", the German television spoof by Mike Myers on Saturday Night Live.

== Critical reception ==
Professional ratings
Review scores
Source	Rating
AllMusic	3/5 stars
Drowned in Sound	6/10
Mojo	2/5 stars
Q	2/5 stars
Smash Hits	5/10
Tom Hull – on the Web	B
Uncut	3/5 stars

The album received mixed reviews from professional critics, in contrast to much of the band's earlier releases. Journalist Ian Cranna of the British music magazine Smash Hits described the album as "frankly rather dull", adding "one can only assume it's an exercise for their own amusement", although he also recognised Kraftwerk's influence on English groups such as Depeche Mode and the Human League. In their review of the album's 2009 remaster, Drowned in Sound stated that "Techno Pop can only be seen as a flop, despite the intermittent brilliance of its opening section." In his retrospective review of the album, Jason Ankeny of AllMusic commented that "the record's short running time (less than 36 minutes) seems to indicate a lack of ideas and new directions with the spartan opening tracks, "Technopop" and "Music Non-Stop".

== Track listing ==
Side one
No.	Title	Writer(s)	Length
1.	"Boing Boom Tschak"	Ralf Hütter; Florian Schneider; Karl Bartos	2:57
2.	"Techno Pop"	Hütter; Schneider; Bartos; Emil Schult	7:42
3.	"Musique Non-Stop"	Hütter; Schneider; Bartos	5:45

Side two
No.	Title	Writer(s)	Length
4.	"The Telephone Call" ("Der Telefon-Anruf")	Hütter; Schneider; Bartos	8:03
5.	"Sex Object" ("Sex Objekt")	Hütter; Schneider; Bartos	6:51
6.	"Electric Café"	Hütter; Schneider; Bartos; Maxime Schmitt	4:20
Total length:			35:38

Notes:

- In Spain the album was released in two versions. One was the regular English/International edition, and the other a local Edición Española version, appearing early in 1987, with Spanish-language lyrics for both "Techno Pop" and "Sex Object" (often mistakenly titled "Objeto Sexual" by discographers). The Spanish-only vinyl album was withdrawn soon afterward because of a manufacturing error—a several-second complete drop-out of sound during the final track—and has never been reissued on CD. Both versions were also available as a cassette.
- The song "Sex Object" is absent from the South Korean pressings of the album.

== Re-issues ==
A remastered edition of Electric Café was released by EMI Records, Mute Records and Astralwerks Records on CD, digital download and heavyweight vinyl in October–November 2009. The release was changed back to the original title of Techno Pop. Because of licensing restrictions imposed by Warner Music Group before 2013, this version has only been made available in the US and Canada as a part of The Catalogue boxed set. However, since 2013, with the sale and break-up of EMI, the album’s rights are controlled by Warner worldwide.

No.	Title	Writer(s)	Length
1.	"Boing Boom Tschak"	Hütter; Schneider; Bartos	2:59
2.	"Techno Pop"	Hütter; Schneider; Bartos; Schult	7:41
3.	"Musique Non-Stop"	Hütter; Schneider; Bartos	5:44
4.	"The Telephone Call*" ("Der Telefon-Anruf")	Hütter; Schneider; Bartos	3:50
5.	"House Phone**"	Hütter; Schneider; Bartos	4:57
6.	"Sex Object" ("Sex Objekt")	Hütter; Schneider; Bartos	6:51
7.	"Electric Café"	Hütter; Schneider; Bartos; Schmitt	4:19

Notes

* Remix – previously released as a 7-inch single in 1987.
** Previously released as the B-Side of "The Telephone Call" (German: "Der Telefon-Anruf") 12-inch single in 1987.

== Personnel ==
The original 1986 sleeve notes are, like those in the previous album, unspecific regarding the roles. The 2009 remaster credits provide the following information:

Kraftwerk

- Ralf Hütter – voice, vocoder, keyboards, electronics
- Florian Schneider – vocoder, speech synthesis, electronics
- Karl Bartos – electronic drums; vocals on "The Telephone Call"

Band member Wolfgang Flür is included in a subsequent general list of personnel but is not credited with a musical or production role in these recordings.

Technical

- Henning Schmitz – engineer (Kling Klang Studio)
- Joachim Dehmann – engineer (Kling Klang Studio)
- Fred Maher – music data transfer (Axis Studio, NYC)
- Bill Miranda – music data transfer
- François Kevorkian – mixing (Right Track, NYC)
- Ralf Hütter – mixing (Right Track, NYC), original artwork reconstruction, album concept, production
- Ron St. Germain – mixing (Right Track, NYC)
- Bob Ludwig – mastering
- Rebecca Allen – computer graphics; female voice on "Musique Non Stop" (uncredited)
- Steve Di Paola – computer graphics
- Robert McDermott – computer graphics
- Amber Denker – computer graphics
- Peter Oppenheimer – computer graphics
- Hubert Kretzschmar – design
- Johann Zambryski – original artwork reconstruction
- Florian Schneider – album concept, production

== Charts ==
1986 chart performance for Electric Café
Chart (1986)	Peak position
European Albums (Music & Media)	33
Finnish Albums (Suomen virallinen lista)	27
French Albums (SNEP)	10
German Albums (Offizielle Top 100)	23
Icelandic Albums (Tónlist)	10
Swedish Albums (Sverigetopplistan)	9
UK Albums (Official Charts)	58
US Billboard 200	156

2020 chart performance for Electric Café
Chart (2020)	Peak position
Hungarian Albums (MAHASZ)	30
