= Magazine 1 =

Studio album by Wolfgang Flür
- Released: 4 March 2022
- Genre: Electronic
- Length: 46:05
- Label: Cherry Red Records
- Producer: Wolfgang Flür

Wolfgang Flür chronology
| Eloquence: Complete Works (2015) | Magazine 1 (2022) | Times (2025) |

Magazine 1 is the second solo album by German electronic musician Wolfgang Flür. It was announced by Flür on 5 January 2022 and was released on 4 March 2022 by Cherry Red Records.

== Track listing ==
All tracks are written by Wolfgang Flur.

| No. | Title | Length |
|---|---|---|
| 1. | "Magazine" (featuring Ramón Amezcua) | 4:26 |
| 2. | "Zukunftsmusik" (featuring U96) | 4:15 |
| 3. | "Best Buy" (featuring U96) | 5:14 |
| 4. | "Das Beat" (featuring Midge Ure) | 3:39 |
| 5. | "Birmingham" (featuring Claudia Brücken & Peter Hook) | 4:35 |
| 6. | "Night Drive" (featuring Anushka) | 6:04 |
| 7. | "Electric Sheep" (featuring U96 & Carl Cox) | 5:07 |
| 8. | "Billionaire (Symphony Of Might)" (featuring Juan Atkins) | 4:37 |
| 9. | "Say No!" (featuring Maps) | 8:08 |
| Total length: | | 46:05 |
