= Eloquence (Wolfgang Flür album) =

Eloquence: Complete Works

Studio album by Wolfgang Flür
- Released: 16 October 2015
- Genre: Electronic
- Length: 75:28
- Label: Cherry Red Records
- Producer: Wolfgang Flür

Wolfgang Flür chronology
Eloquence: Complete Works (2015)	Magazine 1 (2022)

Eloquence (also known as Eloquence: Complete Works) is the first solo album by German electronic musician and ex-Kraftwerk member Wolfgang Flür. It was announced by Cherry Red Records on 1 October 2015 and released on 16 October 2015. An expanded re-release of the album, titled Eloquence Expanded, was announced on 29 February 2020, with a 100 copy limited edition signed release before its full release on 6 April 2020.

== Track listing ==
All tracks are written by Wolfgang Flur.

No.	Title	Length
1.	"I Was a Robot"	5:48
2.	"Cover Girl [The Ninjaneer Mix]"	5:42
3.	"On The Beam"	3:41
4.	"Blue Spark"	3:30
5.	"Staying in the Shadow"	3:12
6.	"Moda Makina (Fashion Machine)"	3:12
7.	"Beat Perfecto"	5:46
8.	"Axis of Envy"	3:50
9.	"Best Friend's Birthday"	3:14
10.	"Pleasure Lane"	4:12
11.	"Silk Paper"	4:41
12.	"Golden Light"	4:50
13.	"I Was a Robot [Radio Edit]"	3:43
14.	"Cover Girl [English Version]"	4:12
15.	"Cover Girl [German Version]"	4:18
16.	"On the Beam [German Version]"	3:33
17.	"On the Beam [Japanese Version]"	3:45
18.	"On the Beam [Tokyo Minimal Mix]"	4:19
Total length:		75:28
