= Times (Wolfgang Flür album) =

2025 album by Wolfgang Flür

Studio album by Wolfgang Flür
- Released: 28 March 2025
- Genre: Electronic
- Label: Cherry Red Records
- Producer: Wolfgang Flür

Wolfgang Flür chronology
Magazine 1 (2022)	Times (2025)

Times is the third studio album by German electronic musician Wolfgang Flür. It was released on 28 March 2025, by Cherry Red Records. Originally conceived as a sequel to his previous album, Magazine 1 (2022), Flür credited French musician Thomas Bangalter for helping bring the project to fruition after receiving a message on Facebook during the album's early stages. He collaborated with other prominent musicians, including Peter Hook and Juan Atkins, and confirmed Bangalter's involvement multiple times. The album was released on CD, vinyl, and digital platforms, featuring additional collaborations with U96, Boris Blank, Anthony Rother, and Emil Schult. After the album's release, it was revealed that Bangalter did not work on the album. Instead, Flür had been deceived by an imposter using the name Thomas Vangarde. The album was generally well received by critics, who likened the songs to those from Flür's time with Kraftwerk. However, some critics criticized the tracks for lacking excitement.

== Background and release ==
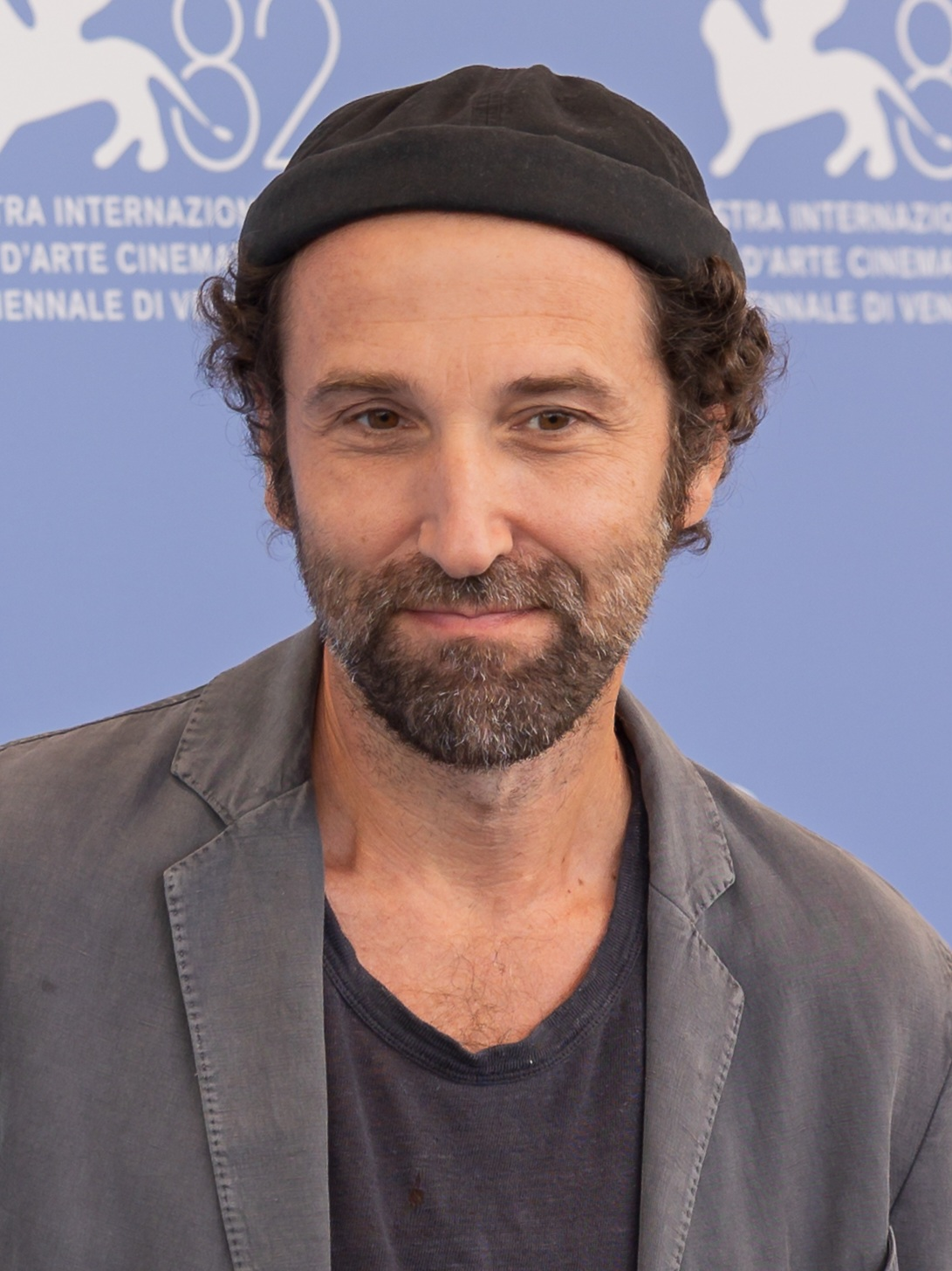
Flür teased collaboration with Thomas Bangalter (pictured) on the album, but it was later revealed to be an impersonator after the release.

Times began as a sequel to Flür's previous album, Magazine 1, which was released in 2022. In interviews in 2023 and 2024, Flür commented on Bangalter's collaboration on the album, stating that Bangalter was involved in bringing the project to fruition. He also revealed that he worked with Peter Hook and Juan Atkins on the upcoming album. At the time, the album was expected to be released in September 2024.

In January 2025, Flür announced that the album would be released on 28 March 2025, stating that the album reflected "both the rapid acceleration of change in our world and the enduring power of human creativity." In the announcement, he revealed the full list of contributors and collaborators on the album, including U96, Boris Blank, Anthony Rother, Emil Schult, Hook, Atkins, and Bangalter, purportedly credited under the name Thomas Vangarde. The album was released on CD, vinyl, and digital platforms through Cherry Red Records following a pre-order period.

After the albums release, it was revealed that Flür had unknowingly worked with an impersonator who posed as Bangalter. Luke Perez, who ran the Daft Punk Historian fan-blog, documented a timeline of events of the release. Perez reached out to the administrator of the official Daft Punk Discord, who is connected to Daft Punk's team, and received confirmation that Bangalter was not involved in the making of the album. It was publicly confirmed that Thomas Vangarde was not an alias of Bangalter and that their legal teams had been informed of the hoax. The Discord administrator asked the public to extend kindness to Flür regarding the situation.

== Reception ==
Professional ratings
Aggregate scores
Source	Rating
Metacritic	68/100
Review scores
Source	Rating
AllMusic	3/5 stars
Mojo	4/5 stars
PopMatters	5/10
Record Collector	3/5 stars
Classic Rock	7/10
Uncut	7/10

Times received generally positive reviews, with the review aggregate site Metacritic reporting six published reviews and assigning the album an aggregated score of 68 out of 100. Roy Wilkinson of Mojo rated it, saying that Times "feels like a valedictory vista - across time, money, sex and space travel." Robert Plummer of Louder Than War said that the listener will be taken on a "sonic journey with instrumental passages that venture well beyond Kraftwerk’s deliberately restricted palette of tones."

John Bergstrom of PopMatters rated it 5/10, describing Times as consistent despite its various collaborators while noting that the album was a "digitized, [...] modernized take on the clean, sharp, ultra-stylized electronic pop music Kraftwerk invented." However, Bergstrom noted that due to the different collaborators, Flür often became the guest on his own album. He described the tracks with Thomas Vangarde, "Uber_All" and "Monday to the Moon" for being "well-crafted nostalgia exercises." Paul Simpson of AllMusic rated it and stated that Flür was "trying to glance forward at the future on Times more than he did on his previous albums," but noted that the songs, while well-produced, weren't always exciting.

== Track listing ==
All music is composed by Wolfgang Flür.

Times standard track listing
No.	Title	Music	Length
1.	"Posh" (featuring Juan Atkins)	Juan Atkins; Miriam Suarez; Peter Duggall	4:32
2.	"Planet In Fever" (featuring U96 and Emil Schult)	Emil Schult; Suarez; Alberto Hauss; Hayo Panarinfo	5:36
3.	"Cinema" (featuring Fabrice Lig)	Fabrice Lig	5:16
4.	"Far Away"	Duggal	7:22
5.	"Future" (featuring Newmen)	Joerg Schmidt; Martin Heimann	5:57
6.	"Über_Hall" (featuring Peter Hook)	Kate Kershaw; Duggal; Peter Hook	5:11
7.	"Magazine" (Imppu Rework)	Ilmari Myllynen	2:42
8.	"Property" (featuring Anthony Rother)	Anthony Rother; Duggal; Rob Keane	4:57
9.	"Times"	Duggal; Victoria Port	5:27
10.	"Global Youth" (featuring Boris Blank and Emil Schult)	Boris Blank; Schult; Jon Russel; Duggal; Port	7:04
11.	"Sexersizer" (featuring U96)	Suarez; Hauss; Panarinfo	3:51
12.	"Hildebrandlied" (featuring U96)	Jeannine Flür; Suarez; Hauss; Panarinfo	6:01
13.	"Monday To The Moon" (featuring Peter Hook)	Duggal; Hook; Port	6:58

== Personnel ==
- Markus Luigs – artwork and photography
- Steffen Müller – mastering
- Zuhal Korkmaz – photography
