= Rebecca Allen (artist) =

American digital artist

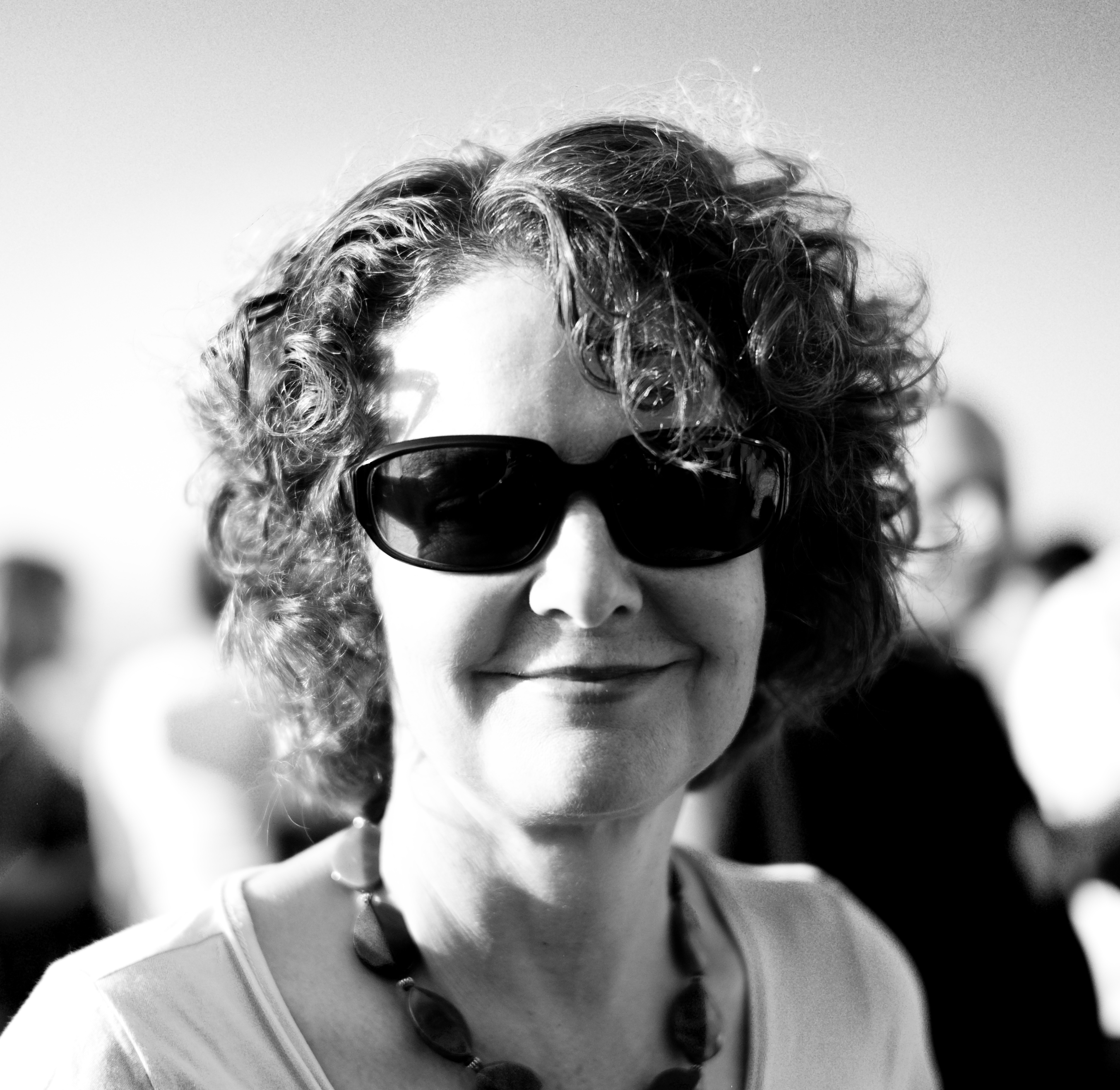
- Rebecca Allen in 2007
- Born: 1953 (age 72–73)
- Education: Rhode Island School of Design, Massachusetts Institute of Technology
- Known for: Digital Art
- Website: www.rebeccaallen.com/home

Rebecca Allen is an American digital artist inspired by the aesthetics of motion, the study of perception and behavior, and the potential of advanced technology. Her artwork takes the form of experimental video, large-scale performances, live simulations and virtual and augmented reality art installations. It addresses issues of gender, identity and what it means to be human as technology redefines our sense of reality.

== Early life ==
Allen began her art practice in the early 1970s while working toward a B.F.A. degree at the Rhode Island School of Design (RISD). She received her Master of Science degree in 1980 from the Architecture Machine Group (predecessor to the MIT Media Lab) at Massachusetts Institute of Technology.

== Select works ==
=== Swimmer (1981) ===
"Swimmer" is a looping video animation that Allen curated to show human animation using technology. It was displayed on the exhibition entitled A Retrospective in 1986, which was hosted by SIGGRAPH.

=== Steps (1982) ===
"Steps" is a video performance that Allen animated with the goal of creating a human in a virtual space. The video itself showcases a series of digitally animated people walking up a staircase on a looped motion. This piece was displayed in the 1986 exhibition entitled A Retrospective, showcased by SIGGRAPH.

=== The Catherine Wheel (1982) ===
In creating "The Catherine Wheel" Allen worked alongside the choreographer Twyla Tharp. Tharp later used the animation for this video in her PBS video film of the same title. This project is a two and a half minute video that Allen created animation for. Allen composed this piece when she worked at the New York Institute of Technology Computer Graphics Laboratory. She produced the animation of St. Catherine by placing a mathematically derived wireframe around the performer which allowed every stride made by the performer. A keyframe was captured allowed for the illusion of a continuous movement of the dancer.

=== Emergence (1997-2001) [software used for The Bush Soul, Coexistence] ===
This PC-based software system was generated by Allen as a form to create interactive art. The system contains three dimensional computer generated environments and autonomous animated characters. Alongside generating this virtual reality the figures in this piece are displayed in real-time. By having these avatars interact in real time it allowed users to become avatars in the piece. There are also music, voices, and other accompanying sounds that help connect people to the virtual world. which allowed people to use forms of communication that rely on gestures, movements and behaviors.

=== The Bush Soul (#1) (1997) ===
The first piece of a series of three interactive art installations which involve artificial life, behavior, tactile interfaces and 3D virtual environment. This piece is set on a 4 inch by 8 inch digital screen and allows for people to role play and become avatars in an artificial world. The Bush soul is a concept based on a West African belief that a person can have more than one soul, and plays with that idea in order to involve people in role playing into their avatar. The software that was used in this installation was one that Allen created, entitled Emergence. The art installation was also featured in the SIGGRAPH Touchware Art show in the year of 1998.

=== The Bush Soul (#2) (1998) ===
The "Bush Soul (#2)" is the second piece of a three art installation from the same title by Allen, falling back on the concepts from its predecessor, ("The Bush Soul #1") building on the ideas of artificial life, behavior, tactile interfaces and 3D virtual environment. This is Allen's second piece of work to be created with the "Emergence" software. The medium that it falls under, and the method of which it was presented was by the use of a Panorama picture. The piece was later noted for being included in the Exhibition Art and Aesthetics of Artificial Life in the year 1998, as well as being featured in the art exhibition in the museum Centro Culturale Claudio Trevi in 1999.

=== The Bush Soul (#3) (1999) ===
"Bush Soul (#3)" is the third and final art installation in the Bush Soul series. "Bush Soul #3" was built off of the similar concepts Allen envisioned and practiced in "The Bush Soul #2" and "The Bush Soul #1". Allen continued to work with generating a world based around artificial life, the interaction on human behavior, tactile interfaces and 3D virtual environment, similar to the prior projects. This final addition to the three piece installation functions by having a force-feedback joystick. This provides the user with both navigation and tactile sensations. Also, it got its software program from the same software used in "Bush Soul #2" called Emergence. This piece was also worked on and funded by the Stephen Petronio Dance Company. Also, it received funding in part by the Intel Research Council. This piece also was featured in several Exhibitions, such as Women in Science (Genomically Yours) in 2003, ACM Siggraph festival in 2001.

=== Coexistence (2001) ===
Coexistence was an interactive art installation that blurs the boundaries between physical and virtual realities. People experience a shared world of mixed reality through a unique sensory interface using breathing and haptics. Funded by IDII Interaction Design Institute Ivrea, Italy. The piece makes use of two personal computers and two head mounted displays. The piece also used head tracking and attached digital cameras, supplemented by two prototype interface devices. Each prototype interface device contains a breath sensor and modified force feedback to the original game pad. The software for this art installation or piece is built on the real-time video and real-time 3D animation; Emergence.

=== The Brain Stripped Bare (2002) ===
The Brain Stripped Bare was an installation and performance by Allen where she considers a future where people live simultaneously in multiple realities, where the boundaries between physical and virtual reality are blurred and thoughts are expressed telepathically. The technology she created provided an enhanced life experience. With this in mind, Allen created sophisticated forms of surveillance that track people's behaviors, movements and identities. The piece was commissioned as part of the rhein.tanzmedia.net-Prize Partially funded by the Intel Research Council. It was also presented in the Duisburger Akzente: ICHS Festival in 2003.

== Art exhibitions and performances ==
- 1986: Swimmer, SIGGRAPH 1986: A Retrospective, Dallas, Texas.
- 1998: The Bush Soul (#2), Art and Aesthetics of Artificial Life exhibition, University of California, Los Angeles.
- 1998: Bush Soul (#2), July 19–24, 1998: SIGGRAPH 1998: Touchware, Orlando, Florida.
- 1999: The Bush Soul (#3), SIGGRAPH 1999, ACM Siggraph, Orlando, Florida.
- 1999: The Bush Soul (#3), Ars Electronica 1999: Lifescience, Ars Electronica Linz, Linz.
- 1999: The Bush Soul (#3), Interactive Frictions exhibition, University of Southern California, Los Angeles.
- 1999: The Bush Soul (#2), The Material - Immaterial exhibition, Centro Culturale Claudio Trevi, Bolzano BZ, Italy.
- 2000: The Bush Soul (#3), Shift-CTRL: Computers, Games and Art exhibition, Beall Center for Art and Technology University of California Irvine, Irvine.
- 2000: The Bush Soul (#3) Internet As Cyborg exhibition, Artfutura festival, Barcelona.
- 2001: The Bush Soul (#3) SIGGRAPH 2001 festival, ACM Siggraph, Orlando, Florida.
- 2001: The Bush Soul (#3), Mixed Realities Exhibition, (Coexistence) Interaction Design Institute Ivrea Gallery, Ivrea, Italy.
- 2001: The Bush Soul (#3), Ground Zero Exhibition, The Tech Museum of Innovation, San Jose.
- 2003: Women in Science (Genomically Yours) (The Bush Soul #3), Universal Concepts Unlimited Gallery, New York, New York.
- 2003: Sound & Vision - The Music Video (Musique Non-Stop), Tokyo Metropolitan Museum of Photography, Curator: Tomoe Moriyama, December 2002-February 2003, Tokyo, Japan.
- 2003: The Brain Stripped Bare, Installation and Performance, Tanzhaus NRW, Dusseldorf, Germany.
- 2012: 13- Architecture and Design Galleries (Born out of Necessity), Museum of Modern Art, New York, New York.
- 2016: Inside virtual reality art installation, Gazelli Art House, London, United Kingdom.
- 2024: Rebecca Allen. Solo Exhibition 1974 - now!, Digital Art Museum / DAM Projects, Berlin.
- 2024: Radical Software: Women, Art & Computing 1960–1991, MUDAM, Luxembourg.

== Awards ==
- 1981–1982: Emmy for outstanding achievement in design for the title sequence for CBS Walter Cronkite's Universe.
- 2024: DAM Digital Art Award, Digital Art Museum, Berlin.
