= The Catalogue =

Box set by Kraftwerk
- Released: 2 October 2009
- Recorded: 1974–2003
- Studios: Discs 2–8: Kling Klang (Düsseldorf); Disc 1: Conny's Studio (Cologne)
- Genre: Electronic
- Length: 352:22
- Labels: Kling Klang; EMI
- Producers: Fritz Hilpert; Ralf Hütter; Conny Plank; Henning Schmitz; Florian Schneider

Kraftwerk chronology
Minimum-Maximum (2005)	The Catalogue (2009)	3-D The Catalogue (2017)

The Catalogue (German: Der Katalog) is a box set consisting of the eight albums by German electronic music band Kraftwerk that were released from 1974 to 2003. All albums are digitally remastered, with most of the cover art redesigned, including rare photographs in the liner notes that were not part of each album's original release.

== Contents and formats ==
We've been digitally transferring all of Kraftwerk's original recordings and sound sources from our badly degrading master tapes while our engineers, Fritz and Henning, have been working in parallel to remaster our early albums for re-release. So for the first time, our recordings will be available in crisp, clear Kling Klang sound with all the fold-out covers and images our label at the time either messed up or wouldn't pay for. There will be some alternate mixes of tracks and some unedited versions, but unfortunately we don't have much unreleased material. We never recorded extra songs or twenty different versions of the same song. We would complete a song and then move forward, always keeping very focused on one Kling Klang project at a time.

— Ralf Hütter, 2004

The sound needed remastering… it’s like a reconstruction, like when a painter takes his paintings from the archives and blows the dust off and puts them in a retrospective. It was quite time-consuming work, but I think once you see it you will immediately understand. —Ralf Hütter

The albums included in the boxed set are the following:

1. Autobahn (1974)
2. Radio-Activity (German title: Radio-Aktivität; 1975)
3. Trans-Europe Express (German title: Trans Europa Express; 1977)
4. The Man-Machine (German title: Die Mensch-Maschine; 1978)
5. Computer World (German title: Computerwelt; 1981)
6. Electric Café (1986; here given its originally intended name of Techno Pop)
7. The Mix (1991)
8. Tour de France Soundtracks (2003; now titled Tour de France)

Due to licensing issues, three of these albums—Computer World, Electric Café (now re-christened with its original working title of Techno Pop) and The Mix—are unavailable in the United States except as part of the boxed set (although they can now be found on streaming services such as Spotify). The Techno Pop album contains a slightly revised track listing from its predecessor Electric Café: the song "The Telephone Call" now appears in its much shorter single mix, and that single's B-side remix, "House Phone", has been added as a proper album track. As with previous Kraftwerk releases, the collection is distributed in two versions: English-language vocal tracks for international distribution and another (Der Katalog) with German-language vocal tracks. The boxed set contains eight CDs in mini-vinyl card wallet packaging, plus individual large-format booklets. On October 5, 2009, Kraftwerk released several remastered albums with redesigned artwork.

== Release ==
Front cover of the 2004 promo version of The Catalogue.

The boxed set was initially planned for release in 2004 on compact disc and vinyl format and was distributed as a promotional boxed set on compact disc. Copies were often sold on eBay for high prices. An actual release date was not announced and the project remained unreleased for years, despite having a page on the Kraftwerk website during this time.

The individual remastered albums were eventually made available on compact disc in October 2009, while an 8-CD boxed set and heavyweight vinyl versions followed in November. Due to licensing restrictions imposed by Warner Music Group, the albums Computer World, Techno Pop (formerly known as Electric Café) and The Mix have only been made available in the US from Astralwerks Records as a part of the box set, or individually as imports (the iTunes Store also carries the complete remastered catalogue as well). The collection may also be purchased in three different configurations from the group's Klingklang Shop; with a T-shirt, with a set of mouse pads or all three items together.

=== Proposed second boxed set ===
In 2006 Ralf Hütter suggested that a second Kraftwerk boxed set containing the band's first three albums would be released but there has been no official news regarding such a project or an amended release date since.

We've just never really taken a look at those albums. They've always been available, but as really bad bootlegs. Now we have more artwork. Emil has researched extra contemporary drawings, graphics, and photographs to go with each album, collections of paintings that we worked with, and drawings that Florian and I did. We took a lot of Polaroids in those days.

— Ralf Hütter, 2006

== Reception ==
Professional ratings
Review scores
Source	Rating
AllMusic	5/5 stars
The A.V. Club	A
Clash	9/10
Consequence of Sound	A+
The Daily Telegraph	4/5 stars
No Ripcord	10/10
Pitchfork	9.5/10
Record Collector	5/5 stars
Spin	10/10
Uncut	2/5 stars

The box set received universal acclaim from critics.

Finally, after cancellation and consternation Kraftwerk’s back catalog gets remastered and reissued. We think it’s—whisper—better than the Beatles.

— Record Collector

Yes, the remastering is a huge improvement. The sound shines like brand new—a punchier low end, crisper syn-drums, even more shimmering neon lights. And warmer human voices. Looking back, it's remarkable how concise these albums are, averaging around 40 minutes and seven songs each, as is the fact that such feats were achieved by purely analogue means. Even in 2009, compare them to tour-mates Radiohead, and its debatable which band [is] truly the most forward-looking.

— Mojo
