= Wolfgang Flür =

German musician

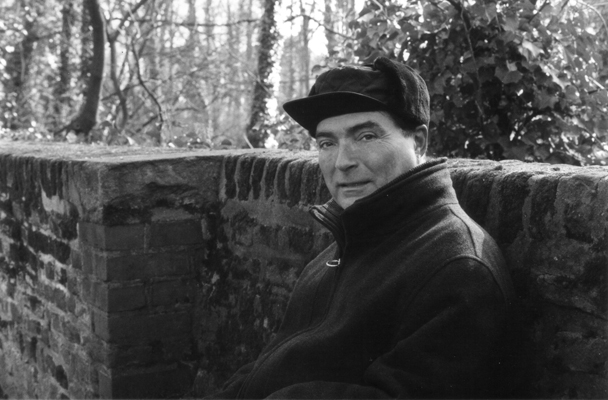
- Flür c. 2005-2006

Background information
- Born: 17 July 1947 (age 79); Frankfurt, American occupation zone in Germany
- Genres: Electronic; synth-pop; krautrock
- Occupation: Musician
- Instruments: Percussion; keyboards
- Years active: Late 1960s–present
- Formerly of: Kraftwerk (1973–1987)
- Website: eloquence-wolfgangflur.com

Wolfgang Flür (born 17 July 1947) is a German musician, best known for playing percussion in the electronic group Kraftwerk from 1973 to 1987. Flür claims that he invented the electric drums the group used throughout the 1970s. However, patent records dispute this, citing bandmates Florian Schneider and Ralf Hütter as the creators.

== Background ==
In the 1960s, Flür played an acoustic drum kit in the Düsseldorf band The Spirits of Sound, along with guitarist Michael Rother, who would also go on to play in Kraftwerk, and who would later form Neu! with Kraftwerk drummer Klaus Dinger.

== Post-Kraftwerk ==
In 1997, Flür founded the band Yamo and released the album Time Pie, a collaboration with Mouse on Mars. Yamo's next release, the 12" I Was a Robot, reached number 6 in the German club charts. Collaborations with Pizzicato Five and Der Plan founding member Pyrolator were announced, and the lyrics to a song called "Greed" appeared in Flür's autobiography, but this material remains unreleased.

In 2000, Flür published his autobiography, Ich war ein Roboter (English version: I Was a Robot). The book covers his youth, early career as a musician, sexual escapades, and some of his activity within Kraftwerk. Hütter and Schneider filed a lawsuit against Flür, causing a temporary halt of the publication and revision of parts that included disputed accounts of his time with the band.

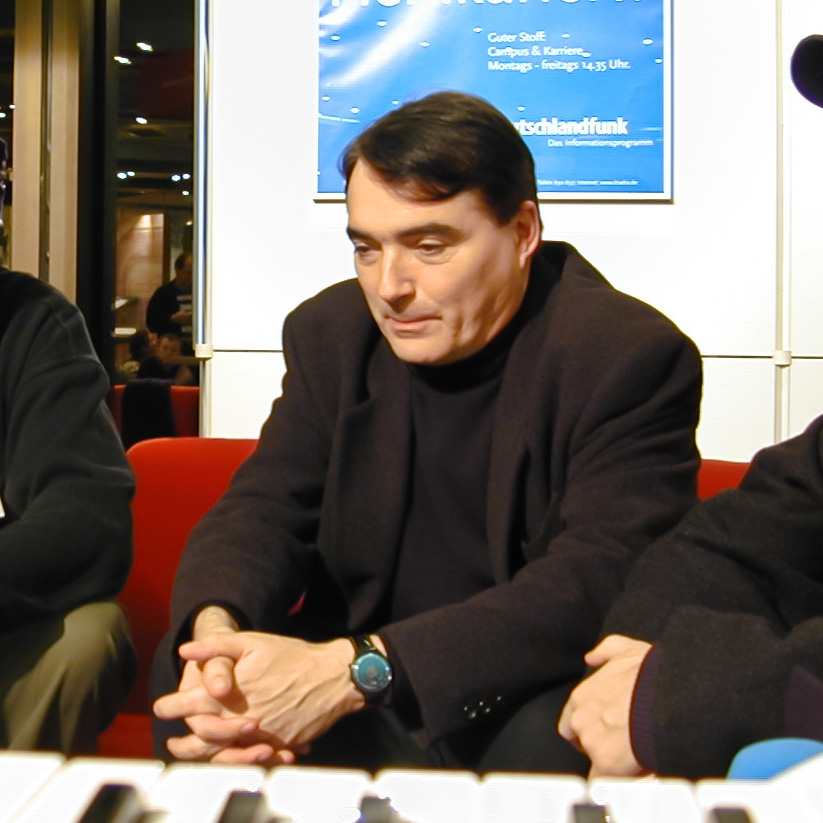
Flür in 1999

Recently, Flür has been seen DJing in clubs, playing tech house and electro. He has also played electronic percussion with the German synthpop band Dyko in live shows and on their 2009 cover of Kraftwerk's "Autobahn". He has also performed under the moniker "Musik Soldat".

Japanese singer Maki Nomiya's 2005 album Party People included the song "Yamate Line," with songwriting and co-production credited to Flür/Yamo.

On 16 October 2015, Flür released his first solo album under his own name, entitled Eloquence.

Flür announced three new collaboration albums, the first of which, "Magazine 1", to be released in February 2022.

On 4 September 2020, Flür collaborated with German dance act U96 to release Transhuman, it featured 3 new songs from Flür, the only songs he's released in 5 years.

On 12 May 2021, Kraftwerk was announced as one of the inductees of the Rock and Roll Hall of Fame with Flür being one of the inductees along with Schneider, Hütter and Karl Bartos.

Wolfgang's second solo album, Magazine 1, was released on 4 March 2022, and included collaborations with Peter Duggal, Peter Hook, Maps, Carl Cox, Claudia Brucken and Midge Ure.

A third solo album from Flür released in March 2025, titled Times. It featured collaborations with Boris Blank of Yello, Peter Hook, Juan Atkins, and more. It was initially advertised as featuring Thomas Bangalter, formerly of Daft Punk, under the name "Thomas Vangarde" until it was revealed the person Flür had worked with was someone impersonating Bangalter online.

== Discography ==
=== Solo ===
==== Albums ====
- Eloquence: Complete Works (2015)
- Magazine 1 (2022)
- Times (2025)

=== With Kraftwerk ===
- Autobahn (1974)
- Radioaktivität (1975)
- Trans-Europa Express (1977)
- Die Mensch-Maschine (1978)
- Computerwelt (1981; Flür is depicted on the cover, but does not play on the record. He does play live on tour concerts)
- Electric Café (1986; Flür is depicted on the cover but does not play on the record)

==== Albums ====
- Time Pie (1996)

==== EPs ====
- Musica Obscura (1997)

==== Singles ====
- "Guiding Ray" (1996)
- "Stereomatic" (1996)
- "I Was a Robot" (2004)
- "Birmingham" (2022) (4 remixed versions and a single edit)

=== Collaborations ===
- Maki Nomiya – "Yamate Line" (featured on the album Party People, 2005)
- Dyko feat. Wolfgang Flür – "Autobahn" (B side to the single "In Ordnung", 2009)
- Empire State Human feat. Wolfgang Flür/Yamo – "Melancholic Afro" (featured on the album Audio Gothic, 2009)
- Giorgio Li Calzi feat. Wolfgang Flür – "Freakin' Out" (featured on the compilation Switched on Bob: A Tribute To Bob Moog, 2009)
- Cultural Attaches feat. Wolfgang Flür – "Golden Light" (featured on the Lazy Summer Vol 2 compilation, mixed by Chris Coco; 2011)
- U96 feat. Wolfgang Flür – "Zukunftsmusik" (featured on the album "REBOOT"; 2018)
- U96 feat. Wolfgang Flür – "Hildebrandslied" (featured on the album "REBOOT"; 2018)
- Anni Hogan feat. Wolfgang Flür – "Golden Light" "Silk Paper" (featured on the album Lost In Blue, 2019)
- U96 feat. Wolfgang Flür – "Transhuman" (2020)
- Newmen feat. Wolfgang Flür - Futur I (featured on the album Futur II (2021)

== Videography ==
- Romantic Warriors IV: Krautrock
