= Florian Schneider =

German musician (1947–2020)

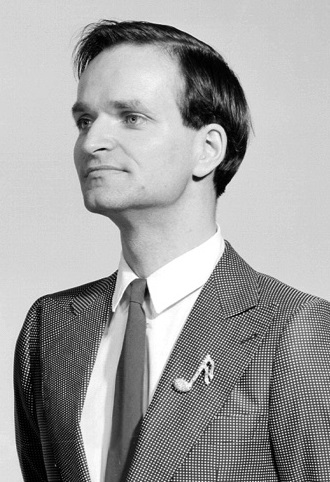
- Schneider in 1975

Background information
- Born: Florian Schneider-Esleben; 7 April 1947; Öhningen, French occupation zone in Germany (now Baden-Württemberg, Germany)
- Died: 21 April 2020 (aged 73) Düsseldorf, Germany
- Genres: Electronic; synth-pop; electropop; art pop; krautrock; avant-garde
- Occupations: Musician; singer
- Instruments: Synthesizer; vocals; guitar; flute; saxophone; drums; percussion; violin; vocoder
- Years active: 1968–2008, 2014–2015
- Formerly of: Kraftwerk; Organisation; Pissoff

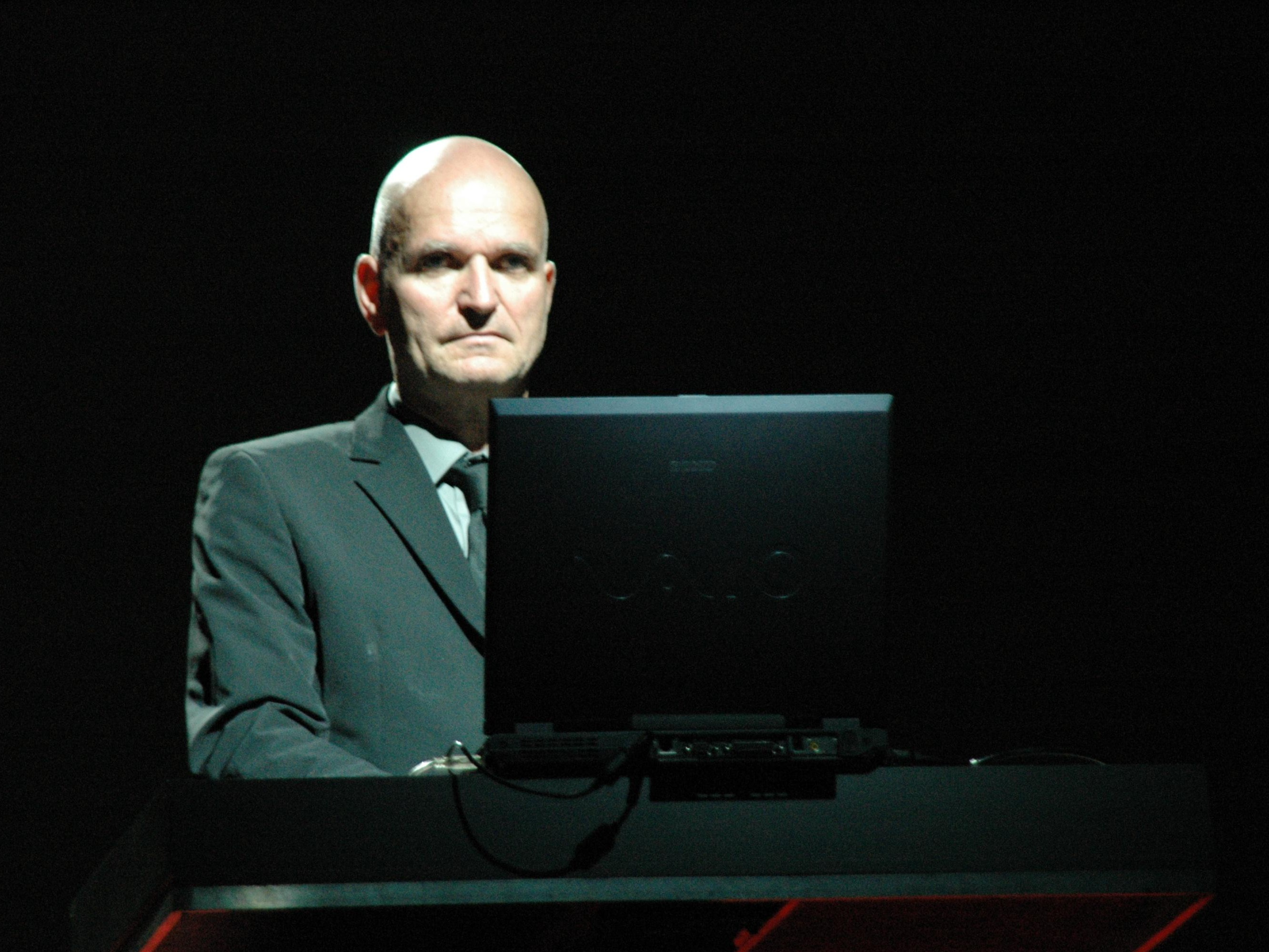
Schneider live in Ferrara, Italy, 2005

Florian Schneider-Esleben (7 April 1947 – 21 April 2020) was a German musician. He was one of the founding members and leaders of the electronic band Kraftwerk, performing his role with the band until his departure in 2008.

== Early life ==
Schneider was born on 7 April 1947 in Öhningen, at the time part of the French occupation zone in southern Germany, near the Bodensee, in what would become the state of Baden-Württemberg in 1952. His parents were Paul Schneider-Esleben, an architect, and his wife Evamaria (née van Diemen-Meyerhof). Schneider was Jewish on his mother's side; Schneider's family moved to Düsseldorf when he was three years old.

== Career ==
Schneider founded Kraftwerk with Ralf Hütter in 1970. They met in 1968 while studying at the Academy of Arts in Remscheid, then at the Robert Schumann Hochschule in Düsseldorf, playing improvisational music together in the ensemble Organisation. Before meeting Hütter, Schneider had played with Eberhard Kranemann in the group Pissoff from 1967 to 1968. From 1968 to 1969, Schneider played flute, with Hütter on Hammond organ, Kranemann on bass and Paul Lovens on drums.

Originally, Schneider's main instrument was the flute, which he would treat using electronic effects, including tape echo, ring modulation, pitch-to-voltage converters, fuzz and wah-wah, allowing him to use his flute as a bass instrument. He also played violin (similarly treated), electric guitar (including slide guitar), and made use of synthesizers (both as a melodic instrument and as a sound processor). Later, he also created his own electronic flute instrument. After the release of Kraftwerk's 1974 album, Autobahn, his use of acoustic instruments diminished.

Schneider, speaking in 1991, said: "I had studied seriously up to a certain level, then I found it boring; I looked for other things, I found that the flute was too limiting... Soon I bought a microphone, then loudspeakers, then an echo, then a synthesizer. Much later, I threw the flute away; it was a sort of process". Although he had limited keyboard technique, he apparently preferred to trigger the synth sounds through a keyboard (later, developments in sequencing limited the need for hands-on playing).

Schneider's approach was concentrated on sound design (in an interview in 2005, Hütter called him a "sound fetishist") and vocoding/speech-synthesis. One patented implementation of the latter was christened the Robovox, a distinctive feature of the Kraftwerk sound. Hütter said of Schneider's approach:

"He is a sound perfectionist, so, if the sound isn't up to a certain standard, he doesn't want to do it. With electronic music there's no necessity ever to leave the studio. You could keep making records and sending them out. Why put so much energy into travel, spending time in airports, in waiting halls, in backstage areas, being like an animal, just for two hours of a concert? But now, with the Kling Klang studio on tour with us, we work in the afternoon, we do soundchecks, we compose, we put down new ideas and computer graphics. There's always so much to do, and we do make progress."

In 2015, Schneider and Dan Lacksman, with the help of Uwe Schmidt, released an electronic ode, "Stop Plastic Pollution", for ocean environment conservation as part of the Parley for the Oceans campaign.

In 2018, Schneider tested the XILS 5000 digital plugin which replicates the EMS 5000 vocoder made by XILS Lab. Schneider spoke in English and French while testing.

=== Departure from Kraftwerk ===
Schneider did not perform on any of the dates of the Kraftwerk 2008 world tour, with his last performance with the band being in November 2006 in Spain. His position onstage was subsequently filled by Stefan Pfaffe, an associate working for the band as a video technician. According to a close associate of the group, Schneider left Kraftwerk in November 2008. In January 2009, Schneider's departure was confirmed.

Reputedly, Schneider's departure followed a dispute with Hütter over a bicycle pump, a rumour which some sources describe as unfounded.

== Death ==
Schneider died on 21 April 2020, aged 73, from cancer.

== Legacy ==
David Bowie titled an instrumental track, "V-2 Schneider", on his album "Heroes" after Schneider, and was heavily influenced by Kraftwerk's sound during his "Berlin period" in the late 1970s.

Shortly after Schneider's death, the bells of the St. Martin's Cathedral, Utrecht rang out with the tones of the song "Das Model".

On 12 May 2021, Kraftwerk was announced as one of the inductees of the Rock and Roll Hall of Fame.

On 19 November 2025, 463 of his personal belongings were auctioned off by his estate.
