= Ralf Hütter =

German musician and composer (born 1946)

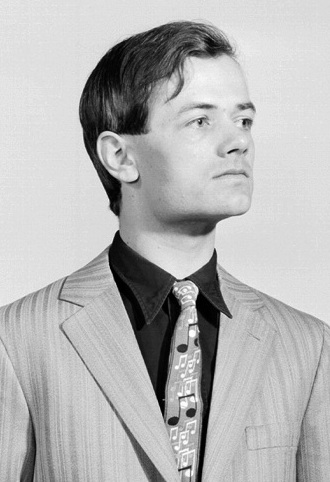
- Ralf Hütter in 1975

Background information
- Born: 20 August 1946 (age 80); Krefeld, Germany
- Genres: Electronic; synth-pop; krautrock; experimental
- Occupations: Musician; singer
- Instruments: Keyboards; vocals; synthesizers; vocoder; guitar; bass; drums; percussion
- Years active: 1965–present
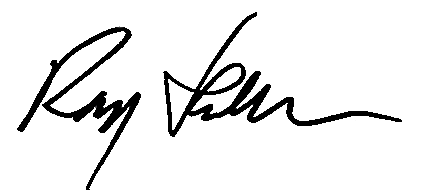
- Website: www.kraftwerk.com

Ralf Hütter (born 20 August 1946) is a German musician and composer best known as the lead singer and keyboardist of Kraftwerk, which he founded with Florian Schneider in 1970, and became the only consistent member of the band (although he briefly left the band for several months in 1971), and the only one to have appeared on every single one of the band's albums. On 12 May 2021, Kraftwerk was announced as one of the inductees of the Rock and Roll Hall of Fame.

== Personal life ==
Hütter was born on 20 August 1946 in Krefeld, Germany. In 2009 he lived near Düsseldorf. He met Florian Schneider while studying improvisation at the Robert Schumann Hochschule. The pair started performing at happenings and art galleries in the late 1960s, subsequently incorporating electronic sounds and building their own Kling Klang Studio. He is a vegetarian. Hütter is a secretive musician who avoids interviews.

Hütter is an enthusiastic cyclist, a fact reflected in some of the band's work. It was widely claimed that when he was on tour, the group's bus would drop off Hütter 100 miles away from the next venue and he would cycle the rest of the way, a story that Hütter later confirmed. The band members took up cycling when recording the album The Man-Machine in the late 1970s. Ralf Hütter had been looking for a new form of exercise. The single "Tour de France" includes sounds that follow this theme, including bicycle chains, gear mechanisms and the breathing of the cyclist. At the time of the single's release Hütter tried to persuade the rest of the band that they should record a whole album based around cycling. At the time this did not happen, but the project was eventually released as Tour de France Soundtracks in 2003.

Hütter was involved in a serious cycling accident in May or June 1982, during the initial period of recording for the 1986 album Electric Café, and was in a coma as a result. Karl Bartos claimed the first thing Hütter said when he awoke from his coma was "Where is my bicycle?", a story Hütter later disputed in a June 2009 interview in The Guardian.
