= List of songs recorded by Status Quo =

This is a list of all songs recorded by Status Quo.

== Lineups ==
=== Francis Rossi / Rick Parfitt / Alan Lancaster / John Coghlan / Roy Lynes (1968-1970) ===
- "Antique Angelique" - Lancaster/B. Young, 1969 (Spare Parts)
- "(April) Spring, Summer and Wednesdays" - Rossi/ B. Young, 1970 (Ma Kelly's Greasy Spoon)
- "Are You Growing Tired of My Love" - A. King, 1969 (Spare Parts)
- "Auntie Nellie" - Lancaster, 1969
- "Black Veils of Melancholy" - Rossi, 1968 (Picturesque Matchstickable Messages from the Status Quo)
- "Daughter" - Lancaster, 1969 (Ma Kelly's Greasy Spoon)
- "Down the Dustpipe" - Groszmann, 1970, re-recorded in 2002 (Riffs)
- "Elizabeth Dreams" - Wilde/Scott, 1968 (Picturesque Matchstickable Messages from the Status Quo)
- "Everything" - Rossi/Parfitt, 1970 (Ma Kelly's Greasy Spoon)
- "Face Without a Soul" - Rossi/Parfitt, 1969 (Spare Parts)
- "Gentleman Joe's Sidewalk Café" - K. Young, 1968 (Picturesque Matchstickable Messages from the Status Quo)
- "Gerdundula" - Manston/James, 1970
- "Green Tambourine" - Leka/Pinz, 1968 (Picturesque Matchstickable Messages from the Status Quo)
- "Ice in the Sun" - Wilde/Scott, 1968 (Picturesque Matchstickable Messages from the Status Quo)
- "In My Chair" - Rossi/B. Young, 1970
- "Is It Really Me / Gotta Go Home" - Lancaster, 1970 (Ma Kelly's Greasy Spoon)
- "Junior's Wailing" - White/Pugh, 1970 (Ma Kelly's Greasy Spoon), re-recorded in 2002 (Riffs)
- "Lakky Lady" - Rossi/Parfitt, 1970 (Ma Kelly's Greasy Spoon)
- "Lazy Poker Blues" - Green/Adams), 1970 (Ma Kelly's Greasy Spoon)
- "Little Miss Nothing" - Rossi/Parfitt, 1969 (Spare Parts)
- "Make Me Stay a Bit Longer" - Rossi/Parfitt, 1969
- "Mr. Mind Detector" - A. King, 1969 (Spare Parts)
- "Need Your Love" - Rossi/B. Young, 1970 (Ma Kelly's Greasy Spoon)
- "Nothing at All" - Lancaster/Lynes/B. Young, 1969 (Spare Parts)
- "Paradise Flat" - Wilde/Scott, 1968 (Picturesque Matchstickable Messages from the Status Quo)
- "Pictures of Matchstick Men" - Rossi, 1968 (Picturesque Matchstickable Messages from the Status Quo), re-recorded in 1999
- "Poor Old Man" - Rossi/Parfitt, 1969 (Spare Parts)
- "Sheila" - Roe, 1968 (Picturesque Matchstickable Messages from the Status Quo)
- "Shy Fly" - Rossi/B. Young, 1970 (Ma Kelly's Greasy Spoon)
- "So Ends Another Life" - Lancaster, 1969 (Spare Parts)
- "Spicks and Specks" - Gibb, 1968 (Picturesque Matchstickable Messages from the Status Quo)
- "Spinning Wheel Blues" - Rossi/B. Young, 1970 (Ma Kelly's Greasy Spoon)
- "Sunny Cellophane Skies" - Lancaster, 1968 (Picturesque Matchstickable Messages from the Status Quo)
- "Technicolour Dreams" - A. King, 1968 (Picturesque Matchstickable Messages from the Status Quo)
- "The Clown" - Lancaster/B. Young/Nixon, 1969 (Spare Parts)
- "The Price of Love" - D. Everly/P. Everly, 1969, re-recorded in 1991 (Rock 'Til You Drop)
- "To Be Free" - Lynes, 1968
- "When I Awake" - Lancaster/B. Young, 1969 (Spare Parts)
- "When My Mind Is Not Live" - Rossi/Parfitt, 1968 (Picturesque Matchstickable Messages from the Status Quo)
- "You're Just What I Was Looking For Today" - C. King/Goffin, 1969 (Spare Parts)

=== Francis Rossi / Rick Parfitt / Alan Lancaster / John Coghlan (1971-1972) ===
- "A Year" - Lancaster/Frost, 1972 (Piledriver)
- "All the Reasons" - Parfitt/Lancaster, 1972 (Piledriver)
- "Big Fat Mama" - Rossi/Parfitt, 1972 (Piledriver)
- "Don't Waste My Time" - Rossi/Young, 1972 (Piledriver), re-recorded in 1998 ("In the Army Now" CD single)
- "Gerdundula" - Manston/James, 1971 (Dog of Two Head)
- "Good Thinking" - Rossi/Parfitt/Lancaster/Young, 1971
- "Mean Girl" - Rossi/Young, 1971 (Dog of Two Head)
- "Nanana (Extraction I)" - Rossi/Young, 1971 (Dog of Two Head)
- "Nanana (Extraction II)" - Rossi/Young, 1971 (Dog of Two Head)
- "Nanana" - Rossi/Young, 1971 (Dog of Two Head)
- "Oh Baby" - Rossi/Parfitt, 1972 (Piledriver)
- "Paper Plane - Rossi/Young, 1972 (Piledriver)
- "Railroad" - Rossi/Young, 1971 (Dog of Two Head)
- "Roadhouse Blues" - Morrison/Densmore/Manzarek/Krieger, 1972 (Piledriver)
- "Softer Ride" - Parfitt/Lancaster, 1972, re-recorded in 2022 (Quoin' In - The Best of the Noughties)
- "Someone's Learning" - Lancaster, 1971 (Dog of Two Head)
- "Something Going on in My Head" - Lancaster, 1971 (Dog of Two Head)
- "Tune to the Music" - Rossi/Young, 1971
- "Umleitung" - Lancaster/Lynes, 1971 (Dog of Two Head)
- "Unspoken Words" - Rossi/Young, 1972 (Piledriver)

=== Francis Rossi / Rick Parfitt / Alan Lancaster / John Coghlan / Andy Bown (1973-1981) ===
- "A B Blues" - Rossi/Parfitt/Lancaster/Coghlan/Bown, 1980
- "A Planet called Monday" - Beckerman/Malone, 1977 (Album - Intergalactic Touring Band, only Rossi & Parfitt on vocals)
- "A Reason for Living" - Rossi/Parfitt, 1973 (Hello!)
- "Accident Prone" - Williams/Hutchins, 1978 (If You Can't Stand the Heat)
- "Again and Again" - Parfitt/Bown/Lynton, 1978 (If You Can't Stand the Heat)
- "And It's Better Now" - Rossi/Young, 1973 (Hello!)
- "All Through the Night" - Rossi/Lancaster, 1976
- "Baby Boy" - Rossi/Young, 1977 (Rockin' All Over the World)
- "Backwater" - Parfitt/Lancaster, 1974 (Quo)
- "Bad Company" - Williams/Hutchins, 1979 (Outtake from Whatever You Want sessions)
- "Blue Eyed Lady" - Parfitt/Lancaster, 1973 (Hello!)
- "Blue for You" - Lancaster, 1976 (Blue for You)
- "Break the Rules" - Rossi/Parfitt/Lancaster/Coghlan/Young, 1974 (Quo)
- "Breaking Away" - Rossi/Parfitt/Bown, 1979 (Whatever You Want)
- "Broken Man" - Lancaster, 1975 (On the Level)
- "Bye Bye Johnny" - Berry, 1975 (On the Level)
- "Can't Give You More" - Rossi/Young, 1977 (Rockin' All Over the World), re-recorded in 1991 (Rock 'Til You Drop)
- "Carol" - Berry, 1981 (Never Too Late)
- "Caroline" - Rossi/Young, 1973 (Hello!), re-recorded in 2002 (Riffs), re-recorded in 2022 (Quoin' In - The Best of the Noughties)
- "Claudie" - Rossi/Young, 1973 (Hello!)
- "Come Rock With Me/Rockin' On" - Rossi/Frost, 1979 (Whatever You Want)
- "Coming and Going" - Parfitt/Young, 1980 (Just Supposin')
- "Dirty Water" - Rossi/Young, 1977 (Rockin' All Over the World)
- "Don't Drive My Car" - Parfitt/Bown, 1980 (Just Supposin')
- "Don't Stop Me Now" - Lancaster/Bown, 1981 (Never Too Late)
- "Don't Think It Matters" - Parfitt/Lancaster, 1974 (Quo)
- "Down Down" - Rossi/Young, 1975 (On the Level)
- "Drifting Away" - Parfitt/Lancaster, 1974 (Quo)
- "Ease Your Mind" - Lancaster, 1976 (Blue for You)
- "Enough is Enough" - Rossi/Frost, 1981 (Never Too Late)
- "Falling In Falling Out" - Parfitt/Bown/Young, 1981 (Never Too Late)
- "Fine Fine Fine" - Rossi/Young, 1974 (Quo)
- "For You" - Parfitt, 1977 (Rockin' All Over the World)
- "Forty Five Hundred Times" - Rossi/Parfitt, 1973 (Hello!), re-recorded in 1991 (Rock 'Til You Drop)
- "Getting Better" - Lennon–McCartney, 1976 (All This and World War II, film soundtrack with various artists)
- "Gonna Teach You to Love Me" - Lancaster/Green, 1978 (If You Can't Stand the Heat)
- "Hard Ride" - Lancaster/Green, 1979
- "Hard Time" - Rossi/Parfitt, 1977 (Rockin' All Over the World)
- "High Flyer" - Lancaster/Young, 1979 (Whatever You Want)
- "Hold You Back" - Rossi/Parfitt/Young, 1977 (Rockin' All Over the World)
- "I Saw the Light" - Rossi/Young, 1975 (On the Level)
- "I'm Giving Up My Worryin'" - Rossi/Frost, 1978 (If You Can't Stand the Heat)
- "Is There a Better Way" - Rossi/Lancaster, 1976 (Blue for You)
- "Joanne" - Lancaster, 1973
- "Just Take Me" - Parfitt/Lancaster, 1974 (Quo)
- "Let Me Fly" - Rossi/Young, 1978 (If You Can't Stand the Heat)
- "Let's Ride" - Lancaster, 1977 (Rockin' All Over the World)
- "Lies" - Rossi/Frost, 1980 (Just Supposin')
- "Like a Good Girl" - Rossi/Frost, 1978 (If You Can't Stand the Heat)
- "Little Lady" - Parfitt, 1975 (On the Level)
- "Living on an Island" - Parfitt/Young, 1979 (Whatever You Want), re-recorded in 2013
- "Long Ago" - Rossi/Frost, 1981 (Never Too Late)
- "Lonely Man" - Parfitt/Lancaster, 1974 (Quo)
- "Lonely Night" - Rossi/Parfitt/Lancaster/Coghlan/Young, 1974
- "Long Legged Linda" - Bown, 1978 (If You Can't Stand the Heat)
- "Mad About the Boy" - Rossi/Young, 1976 (Blue for You)
- "Most of the Time" - Rossi/Young, 1975 (On the Level)
- "Mountain Lady" - Lancaster, 1981 (Never Too Late)
- "Mystery Song" - Parfitt/Young, 1976 (Blue for You)
- "Name of the Game" - Rossi/Lancaster/Bown, 1980 (Just Supposin')
- "Never Too Late" - Rossi/Frost, 1981 (Never Too Late)
- "Nightride" - Parfitt/Young, 1975 (On the Level)
- "Oh, What a Night" - Parfitt/Bown, 1978 (If You Can't Stand the Heat)
- "Over and Done" - Lancaster, 1975 (On the Level)
- "Over the Edge" - Lancaster/Lamb, 1980 (Just Supposin')
- "Rain" - Parfitt, 1976 (Blue for You)
- "Ring of a Change" - Rossi/Young, 1976 (Blue for You)
- "Riverside" - Rossi/Frost, 1981 (Never Too Late)
- "Rock 'n' Roll" - Rossi/Frost, 1980 (Just Supposin')
- "Rockers Rollin'" - Parfitt/Lynton, 1977 (Rockin' All Over the World)
- "Rockin' All Over the World" - Fogerty, 1977 (Rockin' All Over the World) - re-recorded in 1988 as "Running All Over the World", re-recorded in 2002 (Riffs), partially re-recorded in 2022 (Quoin' In - The Best of the Noughties)
- "Roll Over Lay Down" - Rossi/Parfitt/Lancaster/Coghlan/Young, 1973 (Hello!)
- "Rolling Home" - Rossi/Lancaster, 1976 (Blue for You)
- "Run to Mummy" - Rossi/Bown, 1980 (Just Supposin')
- "Shady Lady" - Rossi/Young, 1979 (Whatever You Want)
- "Slow Train" - Rossi/Young, 1974 (Quo)
- "Softer Ride" - Parfitt/Lancaster, 1973 (Hello!)
- "Someone Show Me Home" - Rossi/Frost, 1978 (If You Can't Stand the Heat)
- "Something 'Bout You Baby I Like" - Supa, 1981 (Never Too Late)
- "Stones" - Lancaster, 1978 (If You Can't Stand the Heat)
- "Take Me Away" - Parfitt/Bown, 1981 (Never Too Late)
- "That's a Fact" - Rossi/Young, 1976 (Blue for You)
- "The Wild Ones" - Lancaster, 1980 (Just Supposin')
- "Too Far Gone" - Lancaster, 1977 (Rockin' All Over the World)
- "What to Do" - Rossi/Young, 1975 (On the Level)
- "What You're Proposing" - Rossi/Frost, 1980 (Just Supposin')
- "Whatever You Want" - Parfitt/Bown, 1979 (Whatever You Want), re-recorded in 1997 ("In the Army Now" CD single), re-recorded in 2002 (Riffs)
- "Where I Am" - Parfitt, 1975 (On the Level)
- "Who Am I" - Williams/Hutchins, 1977 (Rockin' All Over the World)
- "Who Asked You" - Lancaster, 1979 (Whatever You Want)
- "Wild Side of Life" - Carter/Warren, 1976
- "You Don't Own Me" - Lancaster/Green, 1977 (Rockin' All Over the World)
- "You Lost the Love" - Rossi/Young, 1976
- "Your Smiling Face" - Parfitt/Bown, 1979 (Whatever You Want)

=== Francis Rossi / Rick Parfitt / Alan Lancaster / Andy Bown / Pete Kircher (1982-1983; 1985) ===
- "A Mess of Blues" (Doc Pomus, Mort Shuman) (1983, Back To Back)
- "Big Man" (Lancaster, Mick Green), 1982 (1+9+8+2 album)
- "Cadillac Ranch" (Bruce Springsteen) (1984 out-take from The Wanderer sessions)
- "Calling the Shots" (Parfitt, Bown) (early 1982, Andy Bown on vocals; B-side of "Jealousy", released as a single in some European countries)
- "Can't Be Done" (Francis Rossi, Bernie Frost) (1983, Back To Back)
- "Dear John" (John Gustafson, Jackie Macauley), 1982 (1+9+8+2 album)
- "Doesn't Matter" (Rossi, Frost), 1982 (1+9+8+2 album)
- "Get Out and Walk" (Parfitt, Bown), 1982 (1+9+8+2 album)
- "God Save The Queen" (trad. arr Rossi/Parfitt/Lancaster/Bown/Kircher; pre-recorded by Quo and played as the introduction at their concert at the Birmingham NEC on 14/5/82)
- "Going Down Town Tonight" (Guy Johnson) (1983, Back To Back, allegedly featuring only Rossi/Frost) - re-recorded version released as a 1984 single
- "I Love Rock and Roll" (Alan Lancaster), 1982 (1+9+8+2 album)
- "I Should Have Known" (Rossi, Frost), 1982 (1+9+8+2 album)
- "I Want the World to Know" (Lancaster, Keith Lamb), 1982 (1+9+8+2 album)
- "I Wonder Why" (Rossi, Frost) (Quo version dates from 1983 Back To Back sessions, re-recorded by Rossi/Frost in 1985 featuring Bown and Kircher)
- "Jealousy" (Rossi, Frost), 1982 (1+9+8+2 album, allegedly featuring only Rossi and Frost while a band recording remains unreleased); re-recorded in 1985 by Rossi/Frost featuring Bown and Kircher
- "Marguerita Time" (Rossi, Frost) (1983, Back To Back); (re-recorded version with Bown on bass played once only on Cannon And Ball TV show in early 1984)
- "No Contract" (Parfitt, Bown) (1983, Back To Back)
- "Ol' Rag Blues" (Alan Lancaster, Keith Lamb) (1983, Back To Back); (alternate version with Lancaster on lead vocal unreleased until Back To Back 2006 reissue)
- "Resurrection" (Bown, Parfitt), 1982 (1+9+8+2 album)
- "She Don't Fool Me" (Rick Parfitt, Andy Bown), 1982 (1+9+8+2 album)
- "Stay the Night" (Rossi, Frost, Andrew Miller) (1983, Back To Back)
- "That's All Right" (Rossi, Frost), 1985 (featuring Bown, Kircher and Rossi)
- "The Wanderer" (Ernie Maresca) (1984 single)
- "Too Close to the Ground" (Rick Parfitt, Andy Bown) (1983, Back To Back)
- "Win or Lose" (Rossi, Frost) (1983, Back To Back)
- "Young Pretender" (Francis Rossi, Bernie Frost), 1982 (1+9+8+2 album)
- "Your Kind of Love" (Lancaster) (1983, Back To Back)

=== Francis Rossi / Rick Parfitt / Andy Bown / John Edwards / Jeff Rich (1986-2001) ===
- "1000 Years" - Rossi/Frost, 1989 (Perfect Remedy)
- "Ain't Complaining" - Parfitt/Williams, 1988 (Ain't Complaining)
- "Address Book" - Rossi/Frost, 1989 (Perfect Remedy)
- "All Around My Hat" (feat. Maddy Prior) - Traditional arranged by Rossi/Parfitt/Bown/Edwards/Rich, 1996 (Don't Stop)
- "All We Really Wanna Do (Polly)" - Rossi/Frost, 1991 (Rock 'Til You Drop)
- "Analyse Time" - Rossi/Bown, 1999
- "And I Do" - Rossi/Bown/McAnaney, 1994
- "Another Shipwreck" - Bown, 1988 (Ain't Complaining) (originally released as a solo single by Bown in 1978)
- "Beautiful" - Rossi/Bown, 1994
- "Better Times" - Rossi/Frost, 1991
- "Blessed Are the Meek" - Rossi/Frost, 1999 (Under the Influence)
- "Bring It On Home" - Sam Cooke, 1991 (Rock 'Til You Drop)
- "Burning Bridges" - Rossi/Bown, 1988 (Ain't Complaining)
- "Calling" - Rossi/Frost, 1986 (In the Army Now)
- "Ciao-Ciao" - Rossi/Bown, 1994 (Thirsty Work)
- "Claudette" - Orbison, 2000 (Famous in the Last Century)
- "Confidence" - Bown, 1994 (Thirsty Work)
- "Crawling from the Wreckage" - Parker
- "Cream of the Crop" - Rossi/Frost, 1988 (Ain't Complaining)
- "Cross That Bridge" - John David, 1988 (Ain't Complaining)
- "Dead in the Water" - Rossi/Bown, 1991
- "Democracy" - Leonard Cohen, 1994
- "Doing It All for You" - Parfitt/Williams, 1989
- "Don't Mind If I Do" - Rossi/Edwards, 1988 (Ain't Complaining)
- "Don't Stop" - Christine McVie, 1996 (Don't Stop)
- "Down To You" - Rossi/Bown, 1994
- "Dreamin'" (aka "Naughty Girl") - Rossi/Frost, 1986 (In the Army Now) ("Naughty Girl" scheduled for release in 1985 but ultimately unreleased)
- "Driving to Glory" - Parfitt/Edwards, 1999
- "End of the Line" - Parfitt/Patrick, 1986 (In the Army Now)
- "Everytime I Think of You" - Edwards/Rich/Paxman, 1988 (Ain't Complaining)
- "Fakin' the Blues" - Rossi/Frost, 1991 (Rock 'Til You Drop)
- "Fame or Money" - Rossi/Bown, 1991 (Rock 'Til You Drop)
- "Famous in the Last Century" - Bown, 2000 (Famous in the Last Century)
- "Fighting With the Pack" - Rossi/Frost/Parfitt, 1999
- "Fun, Fun, Fun" (feat. The Beach Boys) - Wilson/Love, 1996 (Don't Stop)
- "Get Back" - Lennon/McCartney, 1996 (Don't Stop)
- "Get Out of Denver" - Seger, 1996 (Don't Stop)
- "Goin' Nowhere" - Rossi/Frost/McAnaney, 1994 (Thirsty Work)
- "Going Down for the First Time" - Bown/Edwards, 1989 (Perfect Remedy)
- "Good Golly Miss Molly" - Blackwell/Marascalco, 2000 (Famous in the Last Century)
- "Good Sign" - Parfitt/Williams, 1991 (Rock 'Til You Drop)
- "Gone Thru the Slips" - Bown, 1989
- "Heart on Hold" - Bown/Palmer, 1989 (Perfect Remedy)
- "Heartburn" - Parfitt/Patrick/Rossi, 1986
- "Heavy Daze" - Parfitt/Williams, 1991
- "Hound Dog" - Leiber/Stoller, 2000 (Famous in the Last Century)
- "I Didn't Mean It" - John David, 1994 (Thirsty Work)
- "I Can Hear the Grass Grow" - Roy Wood, 1996 (Don't Stop)
- "I Knew the Bride" - Lowe, 1999
- "I Know You're Leaving" - Van Tijn/Fluitsma, 1988 (Ain't Complaining)
- "I'll Never Get Over You" - Mills, 1996
- "In the Army Now" - Bolland/Bolland, 1986 (In the Army Now), re-recorded as In the Army Now 2010
- "In Your Eyes" - Rossi/Frost, 1986 (In the Army Now)
- "Invitation" - Rossi/Young, 1986 (In the Army Now) (originally demoed in 1978)
- "Johnny and Mary" - Palmer, 1996 (Don't Stop)
- "Keep 'em Coming" - Bown, 1999 (Under the Influence)
- "Keep Me Guessing" - Parfitt/Rossi/Young, 1986 (originally demoed in 1978)
- "Lean Machine" - Rossi/Parfitt, 1988
- "Let's Work Together" - Wilbert Harrison, 1990 (Maxi single The Anniversary Waltz), 1991 (Rock 'Til You Drop)
- "Like a Zombie" - Rossi/Frost, 1991 (Rock 'Til You Drop)
- "Like It Or Not" - Rossi/Frost, 1994 (Thirsty Work)
- "Little Dreamer" - Rossi/Frost, 1989 (Perfect Remedy)
- "Little Me and You" - Bown, 1999 (Under the Influence)
- "Little White Lies" - Parfitt, 1999 (Under the Influence)
- "Lonely" - Parfitt/Rossi, 1986
- "Lover of the Human Race" - Rossi/Bown, 1994 (Thirsty Work)
- "Lucille" - Penniman/Collins, 1996 (Don't Stop)
- "Magic" - Rossi/Frost, 1988 (Ain't Complaining)
- "Making Waves" - Rossi/Frost, 1999 (Under the Influence)
- "Man Overboard" - Parfitt/Williams, 1989 (Perfect Remedy)
- "Memphis, Tennessee" - Berry, 2000 (Famous in the Last Century)
- "Mony Mony" - Bloom/Gentry/James/Cordell, 2000 (Famous in the Last Century)
- "Mortified" - Rossi/Parfitt/Bown/Edwards/Rich, 1996
- "Mysteries from the Ball" - Rossi/Parfitt, 1991
- "No Problems" - Rossi/Parfitt, 1991 (Rock 'Til You Drop)
- "Not At All" - Rossi/Frost, 1989 (Perfect Remedy)
- "Not Fade Away" - Petty/Hardin, 1999 (Under the Influence)
- "Nothing Comes Easy" - Rossi/Parfitt/Bown/Edwards/Rich, 1991 (Rock 'Til You Drop)
- "Obstruction Day" - Parfitt/Edwards, 1999
- "Old Time Rock and Roll" - Jackson/Jones, 2000 (Famous in the Last Century)
- "One for the Money" - Parfitt/Williams, 1988 (Ain't Complaining)
- "One Man Band" - Parfitt/Williams, 1991 (Rock 'Til You Drop)
- "Once Bitten Twice Shy" - Hunter, 2000 (Famous in the Last Century)
- "Overdose" - Parfitt/Williams, 1986 (In the Army Now)
- "Perfect Remedy" - Rossi/Frost, 1989 (Perfect Remedy)
- "Point of No Return" - Bown/Edwards, 1994 (Thirsty Work)
- "Proud Mary" - Fogerty, 1996 (Don't Stop)
- "Queenie" - Rossi/Frost, 1994 (Thirsty Work)
- "Raining In My Heart" (feat. Brian May) - Bryant/Byrant, 1996 (Don't Stop)
- "Rave On" - Petty/Tilghman/West, 2000 (Famous in the Last Century)
- "Red Sky" - John David, 1986 (In the Army Now)
- "Restless" - Jennifer Warnes, 1994 (Thirsty Work)
- "Rock 'n' Roll Floorboards" - Brian Alterman, 1986
- "Rock'n Me" - Miller, 2000 (Famous in the Last Century)
- "Rock 'Til You Drop" - Bown, 1991 (Rock 'Til You Drop)
- "Roll Over Beethoven" - Berry, 2000 (Famous in the Last Century)
- "Roll the Dice" - Rossi/Frost, 1999 (Under the Influence)
- "Rollin' Home" - John David, 1986 (In the Army Now)
- "Rotten to the Bone" - Rossi/Bown, 1989
- "Round and Round" - Bown/Edwards, 1999 (Under the Influence)
- "Rude Awakening Time" - Rossi/Frost, 1994 (Thirsty Work)
- "Runaround Sue" - DiMucci/Maresca, 2000 (Famous in the Last Century)
- "Sail Away" - Rossi/Frost, 1994 (Thirsty Work)
- "Save Me" - Rossi/Parfitt, 1986 (In the Army Now)
- "Sea Cruise" - Huey "Piano" Smith, 1999
- "She Knew Too Much" - Rossi/Bown, 1994
- "Sherri, Don't Fail Me Now!" - Bown/Edwards, 1994 (Thirsty Work)
- "Shine On" - Parfitt/Edwards, 1999 (Under the Influence)
- "Soft in the Head" - Rossi/Frost, 1994 (Thirsty Work)
- "Sorrow" - Feldman, Goldstein, Gottehrer, 1996 (Don't Stop)
- "Sorry" - Rossi/Frost, 1994 (Thirsty Work) (originally released by Demis Roussos in 1980 on his album Man of the World)
- "Speechless" - Ian Hunter, 1986 (In the Army Now)
- "Survival" - Rossi/Bown, 1994
- "Sweet Home Chicago" - Robert Johnson, 2000 (Famous in the Last Century)
- "Tango" - Rossi/Frost, 1994 (Thirsty Work)
- "Temporary Friend" - Rossi/Parfitt/Bown/Edwards/Rich, 1996
- "That's Alright" - Rossi/Frost, 1988 (originally a duo track from 1985)
- "The Anniversary Waltz" - various writers, 1990
- "The Future's So Bright (I Gotta Wear Shades)" - MacDonald, 1996 (Don't Stop)
- "The Greatest Fighter" (aka "The Fighter") - Rossi/Frost, 1988 (later re-recorded for King of the Doghouse)
- "The Loving Game" - Parfitt/Edwards/Rich, 1988 (Ain't Complaining)
- "The Power of Rock" - Parfitt/Williams/Rossi, 1989 (Perfect Remedy)
- "The Reason for Goodbye" - Williams/Goodison/Parfitt/Rossi, 1988
- "The Safety Dance" - Doroschuk, 1996 (Don't Stop)
- "The Way I Am" - Edwards/Rich/Paxman, 1989 (Perfect Remedy)
- "The Way It Goes" - Rossi/Frost, 1999 (Under the Influence)
- "Throw Her a Line" - Rossi/Frost, 1989 (Perfect Remedy)
- "Tilting at the Mill" - Rossi/Parfitt/Bown/Edwards/Rich, 1996
- "Tommy's in Love" (aka "Tommy" in 1991) - Rossi/Frost, 1989 (Perfect Remedy), re-recorded in 1991 (Rock 'Til You Drop)
- "Tossin' and Turnin'" - Rossi/Frost, 1994
- "Twenty Wild Horses" - Rossi/Frost, 1999 (Under the Influence)
- "Under the Influence" - Rossi/Frost, 1999 (Under the Influence)
- "Warning Shot" - Bown/Edwards, 1991 (Rock 'Til You Drop)
- "Way Down" - Martine, 2000 (Famous in the Last Century)
- "When I'm Dead and Gone" - Gallagher/Lyle, 2000 (Famous in the Last Century)
- "When You Walk in the Room" - DeShannon, 1996 (Don't Stop)
- "Who Gets the Love?" - Williams/Goodison, 1988 (Ain't Complaining)
- "You Never Can Tell" - Berry, 1996 (Don't Stop)

=== Francis Rossi / Rick Parfitt / Andy Bown / John Edwards / Matt Letley (2002-2013) ===
- "Alright" - Parfitt/Morris, 2007 (In Search Of The Fourth Chord)
- "All Day and All of the Night" - Davies, 2003 (Riffs)
- "All Stand Up (Never Say Never)" - Rossi/Young, 2002 (Heavy Traffic)
- "All That Counts Is Love" - John David, 2005 (The Party Ain't Over Yet)
- "All That Money" - Parfitt/Morris, 2013 (Bula Quo!)
- "Another Day" - Rossi/Young, 2002 (Heavy Traffic)
- "Any Way You Like It" - Bown/Crook/Edwards, 2011 (Quid Pro Quo)
- "Bad News" - Edwards, 2007 (In Search Of The Fourth Chord)
- "Beginning Of The End" - Rossi/Edwards, 2007 (In Search Of The Fourth Chord)
- "Belavista Man" - Parfitt/Edwards, 2005 (The Party Ain't Over Yet)
- "Better Than That" - Rossi/Young, 2011 (Quid Pro Quo)
- "Blues and Rhythm" - Rossi/Bown, 2002 (Heavy Traffic)
- "Born To Be Wild" - Bonfire, 2003 (Riffs)
- "Bula Bula Quo (Kua Ni Lega)" - Rossi/Young, 2013 (Bula Quo!)
- "Can't See For Looking" - Parfitt/Bown/Edwards, 2011 (Quid Pro Quo)
- "Centerfold" - Justman, 2003 (Riffs)
- "Creepin' Up On You" - Parfitt/Edwards, 2002 (Heavy Traffic)
- "Cupid Stupid" - Rossi/Young, 2005 (The Party Ain't Over Yet)
- "Diggin' Burt Bacharach" - Rossi/Young, 2002 (Heavy Traffic)
- "Do It Again" - Edwards/Bown, 2002 (Heavy Traffic)
- "Don't Bring Me Down" - Lynne, 2003 (Riffs)
- "Dust To Gold" - Rossi/Bown/Edwards, 2011 (Quid Pro Quo)
- "Electric Arena" - Rossi/Young, 2007 (In Search Of The Fourth Chord)
- "Familiar Blues" - Parfitt/Bown, 2005 (The Party Ain't Over Yet)
- "Figure Of Eight" - Bown, 2007 (In Search Of The Fourth Chord)
- "Fiji Time" - Edwards, 2013 (Bula Quo!)
- "Frozen Hero" - Rossi/Bown, 2011 (Quid Pro Quo)
- "GoGoGo" - Parfitt/Morris, 2013 (Bula Quo!)
- "Goodbye Baby" - Rossi/Young, 2005 (The Party Ain't Over Yet)
- "Gotta Get Up And Go" - Rossi/Young, 2005 (The Party Ain't Over Yet)
- "Gravy Train" - Edwards, 2007 (In Search Of The Fourth Chord)
- "Green" - Bown, 2002 (Heavy Traffic)
- "Heavy Traffic" - Rossi/Young/Edwards, 2002 (Heavy Traffic)
- "Hold Me" - Parfitt/Morris, 2007 (In Search Of The Fourth Chord)
- "I Ain't Ready" - Rossi/Young, 2005
- "I Ain't Wasting My Time" - Rossi/Young, 2007 (In Search Of The Fourth Chord)
- "I Don't Remember Anymore" - Bown, 2002 (Heavy Traffic)
- "I Don't Wanna Hurt You Anymore" - Rossi/Young, 2007 (In Search Of The Fourth Chord)
- "I Fought the Law" - Curtis, 2003 (Riffs)
- "I'm Watching Over You" - Rossi/Young, 2005
- "It's All About You" - Rossi/Young, 2011 (Quid Pro Quo)
- "It's Christmas Time" - Parfitt/Morris, 2008 (Pictures - 40 Years Of Hits)
- "Jam Side Down" - Britten/Dore, 2002 (Heavy Traffic)
- "Kick Me When I'm Down" - David/Wilder, 2005 (The Party Ain't Over Yet)
- "Leave A Little Light On" - Parfitt/Morris, 2011 (Quid Pro Quo)
- "Let's Rock" - Parfitt/Morris, 2011 (Quid Pro Quo)
- "Looking Out for Caroline" - Parfitt/Young, 2013 (Bula Quo!)
- "Lucinda" - Parfitt/Edwards, 2004
- "Money Don't Matter" - Rossi/Young, 2002 (Heavy Traffic)
- "Movin' On" - Rossi/Young, 2011 (Quid Pro Quo)
- "My Little Heartbreaker" - Rossi/Young, 2007 (In Search Of The Fourth Chord)
- "My Old Ways" - Rossi/Young, 2011 (Quid Pro Quo)
- "Mystery Island" - Parfitt/Morris, 2013 (Bula Quo!)
- "Nevashooda" - Bown/Letley, 2005 (The Party Ain't Over Yet)
- "Never Leave a Friend Behind" - Bown/St. Paul, 2013 (Bula Quo!)
- "On The Road Again" - Jones/Wilson, 2003 (Riffs)
- "One by One" - Parfitt/Young, 2007, originally demoed in 1978
- "Pennsylvania Blues Tonight" - Rossi/Young, 2007 (In Search Of The Fourth Chord)
- "Pump It Up" - Costello, 2003 (Riffs)
- "Reality Cheque" - Parfitt/Edwards, 2011 (Quid Pro Quo)
- "Rhythm of Life" - Rossi/Young, 2002 (Heavy Traffic)
- "Rock n Roll n You" - Rossi/Bown, 2011 (Quid Pro Quo)
- "Run and Hide (The Gun Song)" - Edwards/St. Paul, 2013 (Bula Quo!)
- "Running Inside My Head" - Letley, 2013 (Bula Quo!)
- "Saddling Up" - Rossi/Bown, 2007 (In Search Of The Fourth Chord)
- "Solid Gold" - Rossi/Young, 2002 (Heavy Traffic)
- "Takin' Care Of Business" - Bachman, 2003 (Riffs)
- "The Bubble" - Bown/Edwards, 2005 (The Party Ain't Over Yet)
- "The Madness" - Parfitt/Edwards, 2002
- "The Oriental" - Rossi/Edwards, 2002 (Heavy Traffic)
- "The Party Ain't Over Yet" - John David, 2005 (The Party Ain't Over Yet)
- "The Winner" - Rossi/Young, 2011 (Quid Pro Quo)
- "Thinking Of You" - Rossi/Young, 2004 (XS All Areas - The Greatest Hits)
- "This Is Me" - Parfitt/Edwards, 2005 (The Party Ain't Over Yet)
- "Tobacco Road" - Loudermilk, 2003 (Riffs)
- "Tongue Tied" - Rossi/Young, 2007 (In Search Of The Fourth Chord)
- "Two Way Traffic" - Rossi/Edwards, 2011 (Quid Pro Quo)
- "Velvet Train" - Edwards/Bown, 2005 (The Party Ain't Over Yet)
- "Wild One" - O'Keefe/Greenan/Owens, 2003 (Riffs)
- "You Let Me Down" - Rossi/Young, 2002
- "You Never Stop" - Rossi/Parfitt/Bown/Edwards/Letley, 2005 (The Party Ain't Over Yet)
- "You'll Come Round" - Rossi/Young, 2004 (XS All Areas - The Greatest Hits)
- "You're The One For Me" - Letley, 2007 (In Search Of The Fourth Chord)

=== Francis Rossi / Rick Parfitt / Andy Bown / John Edwards / Leon Cave (2013-2016) ===
- "One for the Road" - Bown, 2016 (Aquostic II – That's a Fact!)
- "One of Everything" - Bown, 2016 (Aquostic II – That's a Fact!)
- "Is Someone Rocking Your Heart?" - Rossi/Young, 2016 (Aquostic II – That's a Fact!)

The only other studio recordings by this line-up are re-recordings on Aquostic – Stripped Bare and Aquostic II – That's a Fact!

=== Francis Rossi / Richie Malone / Andy Bown / John Edwards / Leon Cave (2016-present) ===
- "Backbone" - Rossi/Edwards, 2019 (Backbone)
- "Backing Off" - Rossi/Bown, 2019 (Backbone)
- "Better Take Care" - John David, 2019 (Backbone)
- "Crazy, Crazy" - Rossi/Bown, 2019 (Backbone)
- "Cut Me Some Slack" - Rossi/Edwards, 2019 (Backbone)
- "Face the Music" - Malone, 2019 (Backbone)
- "Falling Off the World" - Cave, 2019 (Backbone)
- "Get Out Of My Head" - Malone, 2019 (Backbone)
- "I See You're In Some Trouble" - Rossi/Young, 2019 (Backbone)
- "I Wanna Run Away With You" - Rossi/Young, 2019 (Backbone)
- "Liberty Lane" - Rossi/Edwards, 2019 (Backbone)
- "Running Out of Time" - Rossi/Bown, 2019 (Backbone)
- "Waiting for a Woman" - Rossi/Young, 2019 (Backbone)
