= Aquostic II – That's a Fact! =

Studio album by Status Quo
- Released: 21 October 2016
- Recorded: 2016
- Genre: Acoustic rock
- Length: 63:28
- Label: Fourth Chord, earMusic, Edel Records
- Producer: Mike Paxman

Status Quo chronology
Accept No Substitute! The Definitive Hits (2015)	Aquostic II – That's a Fact! (2016)	The Last Night of the Electrics (2017)

Aquostic II – That's a Fact! is the thirty-second studio album by British rock band Status Quo, released on 21 October 2016. It is the last album to feature guitarist and vocalist Rick Parfitt, who died on 24 December 2016. Hannah Rickard, with whom Francis Rossi collaborated on their 2019 duet album We Talk Too Much, can be heard as violinist and background singer.

Upon its initial announcement, Aquostic II was promoted with the subtitle "One More for the Road", taken from the title of the band's ongoing acoustic tour and one of the album's original compositions. The subtitle was changed shortly before release to the more recognisable "That's a Fact", using the name of a re-recorded track from the 1976 chart-topping album Blue For You, and reflecting the song's status as one of Aquostic II's lead songs and promotional singles. The album is the band's second - and second consecutive - acoustic record and is a direct sequel to 2014's commercially and critically successful Aquostic – Stripped Bare. Like its predecessor, the album once again features a range of older and often particularly popular Status Quo songs played acoustically, making use of special rearrangements for the enhanced acoustic instrumentation, which again includes a female backing ensemble and several classical instruments.

The album also features three entirely new compositions: "One for the Road" and "One of Everything" on the standard edition (and all CD and digital releases of the album), and "Is Somebody Rocking Your Heart", exclusive to the deluxe edition. A rearranged version of the latter song, written by Rossi and Bob Young, reappeared as a duet between Bonnie Tyler and Rossi on the former's 2019 album Between The Earth And The Stars under the title "Someone's Rockin' Your Heart".

The two released singles from Aquostic II, "Hold You Back" and "That's a Fact", each consist of only the title track. Both releases were solely for promotional distribution (e.g. to radio stations).

== Critical reception ==
Professional ratings
Review scores
Source	Rating
The Arts Desk	3/5 stars
Classic Rock	3.5/5 stars
Get Ready to Rock	4/5 stars

Barney Harsent of The Arts Desk called the album "a fun addition" to the band's catalogue, highlighting "That's a Fact", "Roll Over Lay Down", "In the Army Now" and "Ice in the Sun" as songs that benefitted from the new arrangements, and said it was a reminder that "Status Quo are gifted masters of their craft. Simple songs they may be, but never simplistic".

Writing for Classic Rock, David Quantick stated that "the results are just as effective" as on the previous Aquostic album, and that they are "never less than delightful to the ear".

For Get Ready to Rock, David Wilson observed that "a myth has grown up around Quo that all songs sound the same and that their songs amount to the ABC of rock" but asserted that those who take the time to listen to their discography in depth will realise that "the band and music are a lot more complex than most people give them credit for". He concluded that the original Aquostic album "ably demonstrated there is a lot more to Status Quo than meets the ear" and that Aquostic II emphasises the same point.

== Track listing ==
No.	Title	Writer(s)	Original album	Length
1.	"That's a Fact"	Francis Rossi; Bob Young	Blue for You (1976)	3:34
2.	"Roll Over Lay Down"	Rossi; Rick Parfitt; Alan Lancaster; John Coghlan; Young	Hello! (1973)	4:28
3.	"Dear John"	John Gustafson; Jackie McAuley	1+9+8+2 (1982)	3:28
4.	"In the Army Now"	Rob Bolland; Ferdi Bolland	In the Army Now (1986)	4:02
5.	"Hold You Back"	Rossi; Parfitt; Young	Rockin' All Over the World (1977)	4:09
6.	"One for the Road"	Andy Bown	New composition (N/A)	3:32
7.	"Backwater"	Parfitt; Lancaster	Quo (1974)	4:52
8.	"One of Everything"	Bown	New (N/A)	3:32
9.	"Belavista Man"	John David	The Party Ain't Over Yet (2005)	3:51
10.	"Lover of the Human Race"	Rossi; Bown	Thirsty Work (1994)	3:43
11.	"Ice in the Sun"	Marty Wilde; Ronnie Scott	Picturesque Matchstickable Messages from the Status Quo (1968)	2:20
12.	"A Mess of Blues"	Doc Pomus; Mort Shuman	Back to Back (1983)	2:32
13.	"Jam Side Down"	Terry Britten; Charlie Dore	Heavy Traffic (2002)	3:12
14.	"Resurrection"	Parfitt; Bown	1+9+8+2 (1982)	3:10

Deluxe edition bonus tracks
No.	Title	Writer(s)	Original album	Length
15.	"Lies"	Rossi; Bernie Frost	Just Supposin' (1980)	2:50
16.	"Little Dreamer"	Rossi; Frost	Perfect Remedy (1989)	3:06
17.	"Living on an Island"	Parfitt; Young	Whatever You Want (1979)	3:08
18.	"Is Someone Rocking Your Heart?"	Rossi; Young	New (N/A)	3:38
19.	"Rockers Rollin'"	Parfitt; Jackie Lynton	Rockin' All Over the World (1977)	3:36

Vinyl 2-LP edition bonus track
No.	Title	Writer(s)	Original album	Length
20.	"For You"	Parfitt	Rockin' All Over the World (1977)	3:19

German 2-CD deluxe edition bonus tracks
No.	Title	Writer(s)	Original album	Length
1.	"Lies"	Rossi; Frost	Just Supposin' (1980)	2:50
2.	"Little Dreamer"	Rossi; Frost	Perfect Remedy (1989)	3:06
3.	"Living on an Island"	Parfitt; Young	Whatever You Want (1979)	3:08
4.	"Is Someone Rocking Your Heart?"	Rossi; Young	new song	3:38
5.	"Rockers Rollin'"	Parfitt; Lynton	Rockin' All Over the World (1977)	3:36
6.	"And It's Better Now" (live at SWR1)	Rossi; Young		3:50
7.	"Pictures of Matchstick Men" (live at SWR1)	Rossi		3:44
8.	"Don't Drive My Car" (live at SWR1)	Parfitt; Bown		3:19
9.	"Claudie" (live at SWR1)	Rossi; Young		4:02
10.	"Whatever You Want" (live at SWR1)	Parfitt; Bown		3:38
11.	"Rockin' All Over the World" (live at SWR1)	John Fogerty		3:39

== Personnel ==
Status Quo

- Francis Rossi – guitars, vocals
- Rick Parfitt – guitars, vocals
- John "Rhino" Edwards – bass, guitar, vocals
- Andy Bown – guitar, mandolin, harmonica, piano, vocals
- Leon Cave – drums, guitar, vocals

Additional musicians

- Geraint Watkins – accordion, melodica
- Martin Ditcham – percussion
  - Amy Smith
  - Hannah Rickard – vocals
- Richard Benbow – string arrangements
  - Lucy Wilkins
  - Howard Gott
  - Nicky Sweeney
  - Alison Dods
  - Rick Koster
  - Hannah Rickard – violin
- Sophie Sirota – viola
- Sarah Willson – cello

Production

- Mike Paxman – producer, photography
- Gregg Jackman – recording engineer, mixing
- Martin Haskell – mastering engineer
- Tanja Buck – assistant producer

== Charts ==
Chart (2016)	Peak position
Austrian Albums (Ö3 Austria)	37
Belgian Albums (Ultratop Flanders)	92
Belgian Albums (Ultratop Wallonia)	110
Dutch Albums (Album Top 100)	50
German Albums (Offizielle Top 100)	26
Scottish Albums (OCC)	6
Swiss Albums (Schweizer Hitparade)	13
UK Albums (OCC)	7
