= Whatever You Want – The Very Best of Status Quo =

Whatever You Want - The Very Best of Status Quo

Compilation album by Status Quo
- Released: 1997
- Genre: Rock
- Length: 150:10
- Label: Vertigo, Polygram, Universal

Status Quo chronology
| Don't Stop (1996) | Whatever You Want - The Very Best of Status Quo (1997) | Under the Influence (1999) |

Gold
- 2005 Gold cover

Professional ratings
Review scores
| Source | Rating |
|---|---|
| AllMusic | 4.5/5 stars |

Whatever You Want – The Very Best of Status Quo is a two-disc compilation album by British rock band Status Quo, released in 1997. In 2005, the set was repackaged as Gold, as part of the ongoing Universal Music Gold series.

== Track listing ==
Disc one
| No. | Title | Writer(s) | Length |
|---|---|---|---|
| 1. | "Pictures of Matchstick Men" | Francis Rossi | 3:10 |
| 2. | "Ice in the Sun" | Marty Wilde; Ronnie Scott | 2:01 |
| 3. | "Down the Dustpipe" | Carl Groszman | 2:03 |
| 4. | "In My Chair" | Rossi; Robert Young | 3:10 |
| 5. | "Paper Plane" | Rossi; Young | 2:55 |
| 6. | "Mean Girl" | Rossi; Young | 3:59 |
| 7. | "Caroline" | Rossi; Young | 3:43 |
| 8. | "Break the Rules" | Rossi; Young; Rick Parfitt; Alan Lancaster; John Coghlan | 3:39 |
| 9. | "Down Down" | Rossi; Young | 3:50 |
| 10. | "Roll Over Lay Down" | Rossi; Young; Parfitt; Lancaster; Coghlan | 5:41 |
| 11. | "Rain" | Parfitt | 4:34 |
| 12. | "Mystery Song" | Parfitt; Young | 3:58 |
| 13. | "Wild Side of Life" | William Warren; Arlie Carter | 3:16 |
| 14. | "Rockin' All Over the World" | John Fogerty | 3:32 |
| 15. | "Again and Again" | Parfitt; Andy Bown; Jackie Lynton | 3:42 |
| 16. | "Whatever You Want" | Parfitt; Bown | 4:01 |
| 17. | "Living on an Island" | Parfitt; Young | 3:47 |
| 18. | "What You're Proposing" | Rossi; Bernie Frost | 3:51 |
| 19. | "Lies" | Rossi; Frost | 3:54 |
| 20. | "Don't Drive My Car" | Parfitt; Bown | 4:13 |
| 21. | "Something 'Bout You Baby I Like" | Richard Supa | 2:50 |
| Total length: | | | 76:01 |

Disc two
| No. | Title | Writer(s) | Length |
|---|---|---|---|
| 1. | "Rock 'n' Roll" | Rossi; Frost | 4:04 |
| 2. | "Dear John" | Jackie MacAuley; John Gustafson | 3:13 |
| 3. | "Ol' Rag Blues" | Alan Lancaster; Keith Lamb | 2:48 |
| 4. | "A Mess of the Blues" | Doc Pomus; Mort Shuman | 3:20 |
| 5. | "Marguerita Time" | Rossi; Frost | 3:28 |
| 6. | "Going Down Town Tonight" | Guy Johnson | 3:37 |
| 7. | "The Wanderer" | Ernie Maresca | 3:28 |
| 8. | "Rollin' Home" | John David | 4:00 |
| 9. | "Red Sky" | David | 4:10 |
| 10. | "In the Army Now" | Rob Bolland; Ferdi Bolland | 3:54 |
| 11. | "Dreamin'" | Rossi; Frost | 3:04 |
| 12. | "Ain't Complaining" | Parfitt; Pip Williams | 3:59 |
| 13. | "Burning Bridges" | Rossi; Bown | 3:53 |
| 14. | "Anniversary Waltz Part One (Medley)" | Jim Lee (Let's Dance); Tom King/John Pocisk Paris/Fred Mendlesohn (Red River Rock); Chuck Berry (No Particular Place to Go); Maresca (The Wanderer); Dave Bartholomew (I Hear You Knocking); Albert Collins/Richard Wayne Penniman (Lucille); Jack Hammer/Otis Blackwell (Great Balls of Fire) | 5:32 |
| 15. | "Anniversary Waltz Part Two (Medley)" | Berry (Rock and Roll Music); Billy Swan (Lover Please); Jerry Allison/Buddy Holly/Norman Petty (That'll Be the Day); Melvin Endsley (Singing the Blues); Phil Everly (When Will I Be Loved); Wilbert Harrison (Let's Work Together); Penniman (You Keep A-Knockin'); Enotris Johnson/Robert Blackwell/Penniman (Long Tall Sally) | 5:29 |
| 16. | "I Didn't Mean It" | John David | 3:24 |
| 17. | "When You Walk in the Room" | Jackie DeShannon | 3:04 |
| 18. | "Fun, Fun, Fun" (featuring The Beach Boys) | Mike Love; Brian Wilson | 3:05 |
| 19. | "Don't Stop" | Christine McVie | 3:43 |
| 20. | "All Around My Hat" (with Maddy Prior) | Traditional | 3:06 |
| Total length: | | | 78:50 |

== Personnel ==
- Francis Rossi – lead guitar, vocals
- Rick Parfitt – rhythm guitar, vocals
- Alan Lancaster – bass, vocals
- Roy Lynes – keyboards, vocals
- John Coghlan – drums, percussion
- Andy Bown – keyboards, rhythm guitar, harmonica, vocals
- Pete Kircher – drums, percussion, vocals
- John Edwards – bass, vocals
- Jeff Rich – drums, percussion

== Charts ==
Chart performance for Whatever You Want – The Very Best of Status Quo
| Chart (1997) | Peak position |
|---|---|
| Australian Albums (ARIA) | 71 |
| Belgian Albums (Ultratop Flanders) | 33 |
| German Albums (Offizielle Top 100) | 13 |
| Scottish Albums (OCC) | 18 |
| Swiss Albums (Schweizer Hitparade) | 18 |
| UK Albums (OCC) | 13 |

== Certifications ==
| Region | Certification | Certified units/sales |
|---|---|---|
| United Kingdom (BPI) | Gold | 100,000^{^} |
^{^} Shipments figures based on certification alone.
