= Aquostic – Stripped Bare =

Studio album by Status Quo
- Released: 17 October 2014
- Recorded: 2014
- Genre: Acoustic rock
- Length: 78:39
- Label: Warner Bros. Records, earMUSIC, Edel Records
- Producer: Mike Paxman

Status Quo chronology
The Frantic Four's Final Fling – Live at the Dublin O2 Arena (2014)	Aquostic – Stripped Bare (2014)	Aquostic – Live at the Roundhouse (2015)

Professional ratings
Review scores
Source	Rating
Classic Rock	8/10 stars
Get Ready to Rock	4/5 stars

Aquostic – Stripped Bare is the thirty-first studio album by British rock band Status Quo, first released on 17 October 2014. Produced by Mike Paxman, this is the band's first completely acoustic album and the first recorded with drummer Leon Cave. Its cover features a photograph by Canadian singer Bryan Adams. The album earned a Gold certification in January 2015.

== Background ==
"We did an album of our old songs," Francis Rossi observed, "posed nude on the cover, got Bryan Adams to shoot it… Why do you do it? Because it made everyone talk about it… All those songs were written acoustically. It would be great to have new stuff out. But if you and I were the record company, and the manager comes to us and says, 'They want to write a whole new album of acoustic stuff,' they'd say, 'Fuck off, give us the hits.'"

"I went from not wanting to be involved to really liking it," Rossi revealed. "The new version of 'All the Reasons' is as good as the original, or better. The same with 'Rain', which is a song I really didn't think would work in such a format." "The arrangements of most of these songs are vastly different," noted Rick Parfitt, "especially what we've done to 'Don't Drive My Car', which sounds like a cross between Stéphane Grappelli and Django Reinhardt. People will be taken aback."

== Performance ==
To launch the album, the band gave a ninety-minute performance of the songs at The Roundhouse in London on 22 October 2014. The concert was recorded and broadcast live by BBC Radio 2 as part of their In Concert series. The band were augmented on stage by guitarist Freddie Edwards, son of bassist John Edwards.

The concert was introduced by BBC Radio 2's Jo Whiley. Its setlist differed from the order of the eventual album track listing.

== Track listing ==
No.	Title	Writer(s)	Original album	Length
1.	"Pictures of Matchstick Men"	Francis Rossi	Picturesque Matchstickable Messages from the Status Quo (1968)	3:37
2.	"Down the Dustpipe"	Carl Groszman	single (1970)	2:41
3.	"Na Na Na"	Rossi, Bob Young	Dog of Two Head (1971)	2:55
4.	"Paper Plane"	Rossi, Young	Piledriver (1972)	3:38
5.	"All the Reasons"	Rick Parfitt, Alan Lancaster	Piledriver (1972)	3:08
6.	"Reason for Living"	Rossi, Parfitt	Hello! (1973)	3:21
7.	"And It's Better Now"	Rossi, Young	Hello! (1973)	3:41
8.	"Caroline"	Rossi, Young	Hello! (1973)	3:13
9.	"Softer Ride"	Parfitt, Lancaster	Hello! (1973)	2:57
10.	"Claudie"	Rossi, Young	Hello! (1973)	3:58
11.	"Break the Rules"	Rossi, Parfitt, Lancaster, John Coghlan, Young	Quo (1974)	3:09
12.	"Down Down"	Rossi, Young	On the Level (1975)	2:36
13.	"Mystery Song"	Parfitt, Young	Blue for You (1976)	2:34
14.	"Little Lady"	Parfitt	On the Level (1975)	1:52
15.	"Rain"	Parfitt	Blue for You (1976)	3:56
16.	"Rockin' All Over the World"	John Fogerty	Rockin' All Over the World (1977)	2:40
17.	"Again and Again"	Parfitt, Andy Bown, Jackie Lynton	If You Can't Stand the Heat... (1978)	3:20
18.	"Whatever You Want"	Parfitt, Bown	Whatever You Want (1979)	3:25
19.	"What You're Proposing"	Rossi, Bernie Frost	Just Supposin' (1980)	2:04
20.	"Rock 'n' Roll"	Rossi, Frost	Just Supposin' (1980)	2:43
21.	"Don't Drive My Car"	Parfitt, Bown	Just Supposin' (1980)	3:10
22.	"Marguerita Time"	Rossi, Frost	Back to Back (1983)	3:20
23.	"Rollin' Home"	John David	In the Army Now (1986)	4:05
24.	"Burning Bridges"	Rossi, Bown	Ain't Complaining (1988)	3:45
25.	"Rock 'til You Drop"	Bown	Rock 'til You Drop (1991)	2:48

Tracks 13, 14 and 23 are bonus tracks and are not on the Spotify version, vinyl LP or on most CD pressings. The medley of "Mystery Song" and "Little Lady" was released on the British CD edition, the German MediaMarkt/Saturn edition, as well as the German box set. The latter, however, included only the standard 22-track CD; the medley was instead included on an extra 7" single that also has the exclusive "Strings Mix" of "Claudie". "Rollin' Home" was part of the download edition. All three bonus tracks were performed live at the Roundhouse. The single "Pictures of Matchstick Men" also included a "London Mix" of the song.

== Personnel ==
=== Status Quo ===
- Francis Rossi − guitars, vocals
- Rick Parfitt − guitars, ukulele, vocals
- Andy Bown − guitar, mandolin, harmonica, piano, vocals
- John "Rhino" Edwards − guitar, bass, vocals
- Leon Cave − guitar, drums, vocals

=== Additional musicians ===
- Geraint Watkins − accordion
- Martin Ditcham − percussion
- Amy Smith − background vocals
- Richard Benbow − string arrangements
- Lucy Wilkins − (leader) violin
- Howard Gott − violin
- Natalia Bonner − violin
- Alison Dods − violin
- Sophie Sirota − viola
- Sarah Wilson − cello

=== Production ===
- Mike Paxman − production
- Gregg Jackman − recording, mixing

== Charts ==
=== Weekly charts ===
Chart (2014)	Peak position
Austrian Albums (Ö3 Austria)	33
Belgian Albums (Ultratop Flanders)	123
Belgian Albums (Ultratop Wallonia)	81
Danish Albums (Hitlisten)	26
Dutch Albums (Album Top 100)	26
French Albums (SNEP)	183
German Albums (Offizielle Top 100)	15
Irish Albums (IRMA)	52
Scottish Albums (OCC)	4
Swedish Albums (Sverigetopplistan)	43
Swiss Albums (Schweizer Hitparade)	4
UK Albums (OCC)	5

=== Year-end charts ===
Chart (2014)	Position
UK Albums (OCC)	57

== Certifications ==
Region	Certification	Certified units/sales
United Kingdom (BPI)	Gold	100,000^{*}
^{*} Sales figures based on certification alone.
