= Famous in the Last Century =

Studio album by Status Quo
- Released: 17 April 2000
- Recorded: Astria Studios and ARSIS Studios
- Genre: Rock
- Length: 43:39
- Producer: Mike Paxman

Status Quo chronology
Under the Influence (1999)	Famous in the Last Century (2000)	Heavy Traffic (2002)

Professional ratings
Review scores
Source	Rating
AllMusic	2/5 stars

Famous in the Last Century is the twenty-fourth studio album by British rock band Status Quo, released in 2000. According to XS All Areas - band members Francis Rossi and Rick Parfitt's dual 2004 autobiography - the idea to record a second covers album (following 1996's Don't Stop) came from the band's then-manager David Walker, who said they should celebrate the millennium with an album containing twenty of their favourite hits from the past century. "Another bloody covers album!" grumbled Rossi. "We went along with it, as usual, but inside I felt like a fraud... for me it was the worst Quo album there had ever been - or ever will be!"

"We didn't wanna do it," Rossi told Classic Rock magazine in 2002, "but it sold. I don't think we'll do another one." However, the band issued another covers album, Riffs, in 2003.

Famous in the Last Century reached No. 19 on the UK Albums Chart, a better position than the previous Quo album of mainly original material, Under the Influence. Two singles from it – "Mony Mony" and "Old Time Rock and Roll" – were minor hits.

Jeff Rich left the band after recording this album and was replaced by Matt Letley.

A DVD & VHS of the same name was filmed at the Shepherd's Bush Empire on 27 March 2000. It is a mimed performance of the album. The group did a live gig after the filming of the video, and a few tracks from it were released as B-sides.

== Track listing ==
1. "Famous in the Last Century" (Bown) 1:04
2. "Old Time Rock and Roll" (George Jackson, Thomas E. Jones III.) 2:57
3. "Way Down" (Martine) 2:51
4. "Rave On!" (Petty, William "Billy" Tilghman, Sunny West) 2:51
5. "Roll Over Beethoven" (Berry) 3:07
6. "When I'm Dead and Gone" (Benny Gallagher, Graham Lyle) 3:11
7. "Memphis, Tennessee" (Berry) 2:31
8. "Sweet Home Chicago" (R. Johnson) 2:44
9. "Crawling from the Wreckage" (Parker) 2:42
10. "Good Golly Miss Molly" (Blackwell, Marascalco) 2:05
11. "Claudette" (Orbison) 2:01
12. "Rock'n Me" (Miller) 2:46
13. "Hound Dog" (Leiber, Stoller) 2:19
14. "Runaround Sue" (DiMucci, Maresca) 2:29
15. "Once Bitten Twice Shy" (Hunter) 3:40
16. "Mony Mony" (Bloom, Bo Gentry, James, Ritchie Cordell) 2:58
17. "Famous in the Last Century" (Bown) 1:15

=== Australia bonus tracks ===
1. "Pictures of Matchstick Men" (1999 Version) (Francis Rossi) 3:23
2. "Raining in My Heart" (Special Guest Brian May) (Boudleaux Bryant, Felice Bryant) 3:31
3. "Fun Fun Fun² (With the Beach Boys) (Brian Wilson, Mike Love) 3:59
4. "Whatever You Want² (Andy Bown, Rick Parfitt) 4:16

=== 2006 remaster bonus tracks ===
1. Gerdundula (live) (Manston/James)
2. 4500 Times (live) (Rossi/Parfitt)
3. Rain (live) (Parfitt)

== Personnel ==
- Francis Rossi - Vocals & lead guitar
- Rick Parfitt - Vocals & guitar
- John Edwards - Bass
- Andy Bown - Keyboards
- Jeff Rich - Drums

== Charts ==
Chart (2000)	Peak position
German Albums (Offizielle Top 100)	46
Scottish Albums (OCC)	11
Swedish Albums (Sverigetopplistan)	20
Swiss Albums (Schweizer Hitparade)	56
UK Albums (OCC)	19
