= On the Level =

Studio album by Status Quo
- Released: 21 February 1975
- Recorded: Late 1974
- Studio: IBC (London, UK); Phonogram (London, UK)
- Genre: Hard rock; heavy metal; blues rock
- Length: 37:55
- Label: Vertigo; Capitol (US and Canada)
- Producer: Status Quo

Status Quo chronology
| Quo (1974) | On the Level (1975) | Blue for You (1976) |

Singles from On the Level
- 1. "Down Down" Released: 29 November 1974

Professional ratings
Review scores
| Source | Rating |
|---|---|
| AllMusic | 4/5 stars |

On the Level is the eighth studio album by British rock band Status Quo, released by Vertigo Records on 21 February 1975. The album's cover art features band members in an Ames room, and on the original vinyl release, the inner gatefold sleeve consisted of informal photos members of the group had taken of each other.

In November 1974, the band released the only single from the album, an edited version of a Rossi/Young song entitled "Down Down". The single gave the band their only number one hit to date. Its b-side was the Parfitt/Young album track "Nightride".

The album entered the UK Albums Chart at number one. All tracks were written or co-written by the group and long-term collaborator Bob Young, apart from "Bye Bye Johnny", which was a Chuck Berry composition.

== Track listing ==
Side one
| No. | Title | Writer(s) | Lead vocals | Length |
|---|---|---|---|---|
| 1. | "Little Lady" | Rick Parfitt | Parfitt | 3:03 |
| 2. | "Most of the Time" | Francis Rossi, Bob Young | Rossi | 3:22 |
| 3. | "I Saw the Light" | Rossi, Young | Rossi | 3:40 |
| 4. | "Over and Done" | Alan Lancaster | Rossi | 3:55 |
| 5. | "Nightride" | Parfitt, Young | Parfitt and Rossi | 3:54 |

Side two
| No. | Title | Writer(s) | Lead vocals | Length |
|---|---|---|---|---|
| 6. | "Down Down" | Rossi, Young | Rossi | 5:25 |
| 7. | "Broken Man" | Lancaster | Lancaster | 4:14 |
| 8. | "What to Do" | Rossi, Young | Rossi | 3:07 |
| 9. | "Where I Am" | Parfitt | Parfitt | 2:45 |
| 10. | "Bye Bye Johnny" | Chuck Berry | Lancaster | 5:21 |

=== 2005 remaster bonus tracks ===
1. "Down Down" [single version] (Rossi, Young) – 3:50
2. "Roll Over Lay Down" [live] (Rossi, Parfitt, Lancaster, Coghlan, Young) – 5:41
3. "Gerdundula" [live] (Manston, James) – 2:35
4. "Junior's Wailing" [live] (White, Pugh) – 3:57
5. "Roadhouse Blues" [live] (Jim Morrison, John Densmore, Robby Krieger, Ray Manzarek) – 12:24

== Personnel ==
Status Quo

- Francis Rossi – guitar, vocals
- Rick Parfitt – guitar, keyboards, vocals
- Alan Lancaster – bass, guitar, vocals
- John Coghlan – drums

== Charts ==
=== Weekly charts ===
| Chart (1975) | Peak position |
|---|---|
| Australian Albums (Kent Music Report) | 2 |
| Austrian Albums (Ö3 Austria) | 4 |
| Dutch Albums (Album Top 100) | 1 |
| Finnish Albums (The Official Finnish Charts) | 3 |
| German Albums (Offizielle Top 100) | 11 |
| New Zealand Albums (RMNZ) | 12 |
| Norwegian Albums (VG-lista) | 4 |
| Spanish Albums (AFYVE) | 15 |
| Swedish Albums (Sverigetopplistan) | 3 |
| Swiss Albums (Schweizer Hitparade) | 11 |
| UK Albums (OCC) | 1 |

| Chart (2016) | Peak position |
|---|---|
| UK Rock & Metal Albums (OCC) | 10 |

=== Year-end charts ===
| Chart (1975) | Position |
|---|---|
| Australian Albums (Kent Music Report) | 3 |
| Dutch Albums (Album Top 100) | 12 |
| German Albums (Offizielle Top 100) | 37 |
| UK Albums (OCC) | 28 |

== Certifications ==
| Region | Certification | Certified units/sales |
|---|---|---|
| Australia (ARIA) | 3× Platinum | 150,000^{^} |
| France (SNEP) | Gold | 100,000^{*} |
| Netherlands (NVPI) | Gold | 25,000 |
| Sweden (GLF) | Gold | 25,000 |
| Switzerland (IFPI Switzerland) | Gold | 25,000^{^} |
| United Kingdom (BPI) | Gold | 100,000^{^} |
^{*} Sales figures based on certification alone.^{^} Shipments figures based on certification alone.
