= Spare Parts (album) =

Studio album by Status Quo
- Released: 26 September 1969
- Recorded: January–September 1969
- Studio: Pye (London, UK)
- Genre: Psychedelic rock; psychedelic pop
- Length: 41:50
- Label: Pye
- Producer: John Schroeder

Status Quo chronology
Picturesque Matchstickable Messages from the Status Quo (1968)	Spare Parts (1969)	Ma Kelly's Greasy Spoon (1970)

Singles from Status Quo
- 1. "Are You Growing Tired of My Love" Released: 25 April 1969

Professional ratings
Review scores
Source	Rating
AllMusic	Review

Spare Parts is the second studio album by the British rock band Status Quo, and their final one in the psychedelic vein. It is the first album to feature songwriting contributions from the band's road manager Bob Young. Released in September 1969, it was not a commercial success.

The only single released from the album was the Anthony King–written song "Are You Growing Tired of My Love", backed with the Alan Lancaster composition "So Ends Another Life". Released in April 1969, it reached no. 46 on the UK singles charts.

At the same time as the album's release in September 1969, the band released a non-album single – the Everly Brothers' "The Price of Love" with the album track "Little Miss Nothing", written by Francis Rossi and Rick Parfitt, as the B-side.

== Track listing ==
Side one

1. "Face Without a Soul" (Francis Rossi, Rick Parfitt) - 3:08
2. "You're Just What I Was Looking for Today" (Gerry Goffin, Carole King) - 3:50
3. "Are You Growing Tired of My Love" (Anthony King) - 3:37
4. "Antique Angelique" (Alan Lancaster, Bob Young) - 3:22
5. "So Ends Another Life" (Lancaster) - 3:12
6. "Poor Old Man" (Rossi, Parfitt) - 3:36

Side two

1. "Mr. Mind Detector" (A. King) - 4:01
2. "The Clown" (Lancaster, Young, Paul Nixon) - 3:22
3. "Velvet Curtains" (A. King) - 2:56
4. "Little Miss Nothing" (Rossi, Parfitt) - 2:59
5. "When I Awake" (Lancaster, Young) - 3:49
6. "Nothing at All" (Lancaster, Roy Lynes, Young) - 3:52

=== 1998 remaster bonus tracks ===
1. "The Price of Love" (Don Everly, Phil Everly) - 3:41
2. "Josie" (Dion Francis DiMucci, Tony Fasce) - 3:37
3. "Do You Live in Fire" (Lancaster) - 2:16
4. "Hey Little Woman" (Previously unreleased version) (Lancaster) - 3:56
5. "Are You Growing Tired of My Love" (Original mono version) (A. King) - 3:39

=== 2003 reissue bonus tracks ===
1. "Josie" (DiMucci, Fasce) - 3:37
2. "Do You Live in Fire" (Lancaster) - 2:16
3. "Nothing At All" (demo) (Lancaster, Young, Lynes)
4. "The Price of Love" (D. Everly, P. Everly) - 3:41

=== 2009 Deluxe Edition bonus tracks ===
1. "Josie" (DiMucci, Fasce) - 3:37
2. "Do You Live in Fire" (Lancaster) - 2:16
3. "Face Without a Soul" [Mono Version] (Parfitt, Rossi) - 3:10
4. "You're Just What I Was Looking for Today" [Mono Version] (Goffin, King) - 3:51
5. "Are You Growing Tired of My Love" [Mono Version] (A. King) - 3:40
6. "Antique Angelique" [Mono Version] (Lancaster, Young) - 3:25
7. "So Ends Another Life" [Mono Version] (Lancaster) - 3:13
8. "Poor Old Man" [Mono Version] (Parfitt, Rossi) - 3:41
9. "Mr. Mind Detector" [Mono Version] (A. King) - 4:03
10. "The Clown" [Mono Version] (Lancaster, Young, Nixon) - 3:25
11. "Velvet Curtains" [Mono Version] (A. King) - 3:01
12. "Little Miss Nothing" [Mono Version] (Parfitt, Rossi) - 3:03
13. "When I Awake" [Mono Version] (Lancaster, Young) - 3:54
14. "Nothing at All" [Mono Version] (Lancaster, Lynes, Young) - 3:59
15. "Nothing at All" [Demo Version] (Lancaster, Lynes, Young) - 2:23
16. "The Price of Love" (D. Everly, P. Everley) - 3:42

== Personnel ==
Status Quo

- Francis Rossi – guitar, vocals
- Rick Parfitt – guitar, vocals
- Alan Lancaster – bass, vocals
- John Coghlan – drums
- Roy Lynes – organ, vocals
