= Hello! (album) =

Studio album by Status Quo
- Released: 28 September 1973
- Recorded: 1973
- Studio: IBC Studios, Portland Place, London
- Genre: Boogie rock
- Length: 39:08
- Label: Vertigo (UK); A&M (US)
- Producer: Status Quo

Status Quo chronology
Piledriver (1972)	Hello! (1973)	Quo (1974)

Singles from Hello!
- 1. "Caroline" Released: 31 August 1973

Hello! is the sixth studio album by the British rock band Status Quo. Released in September 1973, it was the first of four Status Quo albums to top the UK Albums Chart.

Keyboard player Andy Bown and saxophonists Stewart Blandamer and Steve Farr played on "Blue Eyed Lady". This was Bown's first appearance on a Status Quo album; he guested on several subsequent releases, and became an official member of the band in 1981. Blandamer and Farr also played on "Forty Five Hundred Times", which featured piano by John Mealing.

It was the first Status Quo album on which drummer John Coghlan was credited with songwriting, although Francis Rossi has said in an interview that the credit was given to Coghlan by himself and his co-writer, Bob Young, at the request of their management to even out songwriting royalty income, with "Roll Over Lay Down" and "Softer Ride" both having been in fact been written by Rossi and Young but the credit being shared or given to others.

== Background ==
1973 started for Status Quo with the chart success of their first album for their new record company Vertigo, Piledriver, and its single "Paper Plane", leading to their first top ten entry on the album charts and a long-awaited return to the top ten of the singles chart. As a result, Status Quo's previous record company Pye decided to release a single from their 1971 album Dog of Two Head. The single, Francis Rossi and Bob Young's "Mean Girl", reached No. 20 upon its release. It was backed by the Rossi/Parfitt composition "Everything", taken from the band's 1970 album Ma Kelly's Greasy Spoon.

In August 1973 the only single from the new album, Rossi and Young's "Caroline", was released, reaching No. 5. It was the group's first single to reach the UK top five. Its B-side was a non-album track titled "Joanne", written by Alan Lancaster and Rick Parfitt.

Hello! was released in September that year, and became the most successful album the band had ever released. Initial copies of the record on vinyl came with a large black and white poster of the group. One track on the album, "Softer Ride", had been previously released as the B-side to the "Paper Plane" single from their previous album Piledriver.

No other singles were issued from the album, although a live version of "Roll Over Lay Down" appeared on a three-track EP released in May 1975, which reached No. 9 in the UK Singles Chart and No. 2 on the Australian Singles Chart.

This was the band's first album to feature the band's name written in the now-familiar font used on most subsequent album covers.

== Reception ==
Professional ratings
Review scores
Source	Rating
AllMusic	4/5 stars

In a retrospective review, AllMusic criticized the over-simplicity of many of the songs and overindulgence of some, while praising the energy. They concluded that the album manages to be effective and enjoyable in spite of its flaws, concluding, "Clearly the product of a band at their commercial and creative peak, Hello! wears its strengths and weaknesses well: not particularly flashy or intelligent, but without exception confident, comfortable and fun."

== Track listing ==
Side one
No.	Title	Writer(s)	Lead vocals	Length
1.	"Roll Over Lay Down"	Francis Rossi, Rick Parfitt, Alan Lancaster, John Coghlan, Bob Young	Rossi	5:42
2.	"Claudie"	Francis Rossi, Bob Young	Rossi	4:05
3.	"A Reason For Living"	Parfitt, Rossi	Parfitt	3:45
4.	"Blue Eyed Lady"	Lancaster, Parfitt	Rossi, Lancaster	3:53

Side two
No.	Title	Writer(s)	Lead vocals	Length
5.	"Caroline"	Rossi, Young	Rossi	4:16
6.	"Softer Ride"	Lancaster, Parfitt	Rossi	4:02
7.	"And It's Better Now"	Rossi, Young	Rossi	3:20
8.	"Forty Five Hundred Times"	Parfitt, Rossi	Parfitt	9:50

=== 2005 remaster bonus track ===
9. "Joanne" (Parfitt, Lancaster) – 4:06 (originally the B-side of "Caroline").

=== 2015 deluxe edition bonus tracks ===
1. "Joanne" (Parfitt, Lancaster) – 4:06
2. "Caroline" (Rossi, Young) – original demo fast – 2:09
3. "Caroline" (Rossi, Young) – original demo slow – 3:08
4. "Don't Waste My Time" (Rossi, Young) – live 1973 Reading Festival – 4:20
5. "Caroline" (Rossi, Young) – mono edit – 2:42
6. "Caroline" (Rossi, Young) – stereo edit – 2:42
7. "Is it Really Me/Gotta Go Home" (Lancaster) – live 10 April 1973, Dublin National Stadium – 25:17

== Personnel ==
Status Quo

- Francis Rossi – lead and various guitars, vocals
- Rick Parfitt – second and various guitar, piano, vocals
- Alan Lancaster – bass guitar, vocals
- John Coghlan – drums, various percussion

Additional personnel

- Andy Bown – piano on "Blue Eyed Lady"
- John Mealing – piano on "Forty-Five Hundred Times"
- Steve Farr – alto saxophone on "Blue Eyed Lady"
- Stewart Blandamer – tenor saxophone on "Blue Eyed Lady"

== Charts ==
Chart (1973–75)	Peak position
Australian Albums (Kent Music Report)	19
Finnish Albums (The Official Finnish Charts)	6
French Albums (SNEP)	35
German Albums (Offizielle Top 100)	11
Norwegian Albums (VG-lista)	6
UK Albums (OCC)	1

== Certifications ==
Region	Certification	Certified units/sales
Australia (ARIA)	Platinum	50,000^{^}
France (SNEP)	Gold	100,000^{*}
Netherlands (NVPI)	Gold	25,000
Sweden (GLF)	Gold	25,000
Switzerland (IFPI Switzerland)	Platinum	50,000^{^}
United Kingdom (BPI)	Gold	100,000^{^}
^{*} Sales figures based on certification alone.^{^} Shipments figures based on certification alone.
