= The Party Ain't Over Yet (song) =

1997 single by Patty Loveless

Single by Status Quo

from the album The Party Ain't Over Yet
- Released: September 12, 2005
- Length: 3:52
- Label: Sanctuary
- Songwriter(s): John David
- Producer(s): Mike Paxman

Status Quo singles chronology
"Thinking of You" (2004)	"The Party Ain't Over Yet" (2005)	"All That Counts Is Love" (2005)

"The Party Ain't Over Yet" is a song written by John David and recorded by American country singer Patty Loveless for her 1997 album, Long Stretch of Lonesome. The song was later covered and released as a single by the British rock band Status Quo in 2005. It was included on the album of the same name.

== Track listings ==
CD single

1. "The Party Ain't Over Yet" (Radio Mix) (David) - 3:36
2. "I'm Watching Over You" (Rossi-Young) - 3:49

7-inch single

1. "The Party Ain't Over Yet" (Album Version) (David) - 3:51
2. "Gerdundula" (Live 2005) (Rossi-Young) - 6:45

== Charts ==
Chart (2005)	Peak position
Germany	90
UK Singles Chart	11
UK Indie Singles Chart	1
