= Riffs (Status Quo album) =

Studio album by Status Quo
- Released: 17 November 2003
- Recorded: 2002–2003
- Studio: Ridge Farm Studio (Rusper, UK); State of The Ark Studios
- Genre: Rock, boogie rock
- Length: 57:32
- Label: Universal
- Producer: Mike Paxman

Status Quo chronology
Heavy Traffic (2002)	Riffs (2003)	XS All Areas - The Greatest Hits (2004)

Professional ratings
Review scores
Source	Rating
Allmusic	4/5 stars

Riffs is the twenty-sixth studio album by the British rock band Status Quo, released in November 2003. Ten tracks were cover versions of pop and rock standards, the other five were re-recordings of songs they had previously issued during the 1970s. The initial release also included a bonus 9-track DVD, featuring footage recorded for television programs and also the video for the 2002 Top 20 hit "Jam Side Down", from the band's previous album Heavy Traffic, recorded on HMS Ark Royal.

The booklet includes studio (non-performing) pictures of the group taken at Powderham Castle, Devon, where they played a gig shortly before completing the album.

== UK track listing ==
1. "Caroline" (Rossi, Young) 4:54
2. "I Fought The Law" (Curtis) 3:04
3. "Born To Be Wild" (Bonfire) 4:31
4. "Takin' Care of Business" (Bachman) 5:07
5. "Wild One" (O'Keefe, David Owens, Johnny Greenan) 3:47
6. "On The Road Again" (Floyd Jones, Wilson) 5:22
7. "Tobacco Road" (Loudermilk) 2:39
8. "Centerfold" (Seth Justman) 3:48
9. "All Day And All Of The Night" (Davies) 2:28
10. "Don't Bring Me Down" (Lynne) 3:57 *
11. "Junior's Wailing" (Kieran White, Martin Pugh) 3:28
12. "Pump It Up" (Costello) 3:30
13. "Down the Dustpipe" (Carl Grossman) 2:21
14. "Whatever You Want" (Parfitt, Bown) 4:32
15. "Rockin' All Over The World" (Fogerty) 3:56
- * Only on UK version.

== UK track listing bonus DVD ==
1. "Caroline" (Francis Rossi, Bob Young)
2. "Roll Over Lay Down" (Francis Rossi, Bob Young, Alan Lancaster, Rick Parfitt, John Coghlan)
3. "Whatever You Want" (Rick Parfitt, Andrew Bown)
4. "Forty-Five Hundred Times-Rain" (Francis Rossi, Rick Parfitt) (Live at Heitere Open Air, Zofingen, Switzerland - August 2003)
5. "Solid Gold" (Francis Rossi, Bob Young) (Live at Heitere Open Air, Zofingen, Switzerland - August 2003)
6. "Paper Plane" (Francis Rossi, Bob Young) (Top of the Pops 2 Status Quo Special)
7. "All Stand Up" (Francis Rossi, Bob Young) (Top of the Pops)
8. "Rockin All Over The World" (John Cameron Fogerty) (Top of the Pops 2000th Edition)
9. "Jam Side Down" (Terry Britten, Charlie Dore) (Video)

== Personnel ==
- Francis Rossi - Vocals & lead guitar
- Rick Parfitt - Vocals & guitar
- John Edwards - Bass & vocals
- Andy Bown - Keyboards
- Matt Letley - Drums

== Charts ==
Chart (2003)	Peak position
Scottish Albums (OCC)	37
UK Albums (OCC)	44

Chart (2022)	Peak position
Swiss Albums (Schweizer Hitparade)	70

== Certifications ==
Region	Certification	Certified units/sales
United Kingdom (BPI)	Silver	60,000^{‡}
^{‡} Sales+streaming figures based on certification alone.
