= Piledriver (album) =

1972 album by Status Quo

Studio album by Status Quo
- Released: 15 December 1972
- Recorded: September–October 1972
- Studios: IBC Studios, Portland Place, London
- Genres: Hard rock, boogie rock
- Length: 39:52
- Labels: Vertigo (UK); A&M (US)
- Producer: Status Quo

Status Quo chronology
Dog of Two Head (1971)	Piledriver (1972)	Hello! (1973)

Singles from Piledriver
- 1. "Paper Plane" Released: 10 November 1972; 2. "Don't Waste My Time" Released: 1972 (US only)

Piledriver is the fifth studio album by the British rock band Status Quo, released in 1972. It was the first to be produced by the group themselves, and their first on the Vertigo label. It peaked at number five in the UK and included several favourites that would be featured frequently in live concerts.

== Background ==
The album was the first the group recorded after they had switched labels from Pye to Vertigo. When recording for Pye, the studio staff had complained about the volume as it would overload the input levels on the recording desk and distort, but for Piledriver, they could bring their touring gear into IBC Studios and record live at stage levels, giving them a much stronger sound.

== Songs ==
The opening song, "Don't Waste My Time" was written by Francis Rossi and Bob Young in the soon-to-be trademark shuffle style the group would become famous for. The lyrics complain about a girl not being serious about a relationship and messing around. The song became a live favourite, and frequently got audiences bouncing around at gigs.

"Paper Plane" was written by Rossi and Young; the lyrics included a reference to the Mercedes-Benz 600 used by the band, which they called a "three grand Deutsche car". It was the album's only single, with the B-side "Softer Ride" (written by Rick Parfitt and Alan Lancaster), which was to become the first in a sequence of thirty-three Top 40 hits on the UK Singles Chart when it peaked at #8 after its release in November 1972. The B-side would later be incorporated into the band's following album, Hello!, released the following year.

The group heard the Doors' "Roadhouse Blues" while touring Bielefeld, Germany, in 1970, and enjoyed its 12-bar shuffle, using it as a template for other songs. The group's arrangement was longer than the original, featuring another verse and three-part harmony vocals.

== Packaging ==
The front cover showed a live shot of the band in their classic "heads down, no-nonsense boogie" mode. It was the first album to credit Francis Rossi under his real name; when signed to Pye he had been called "Mike Rossi".

== Reception ==
Professional ratings
Review scores
Source	Rating
AllMusic	4/5 stars
Christgau's Record Guide	C+
Sea of Tranquility	4.5/5 stars

The album was released in December the same year, and reached the highest position of #5 in the UK charts, spending 37 weeks there.

In a retrospective review, AllMusic applauded the album as both crowd-pleasing and moderately ambitious, commenting that "Despite the name, most of the music on Piledriver is varied and subtle enough to be interesting." They particularly praised "A Year" and "Big Fat Mama". The Village Voice critic Robert Christgau asserted that the band had no decent singer or guitarist, and criticized their attempts at ballads and blues as "boring".

== Track listing ==
Details are taken from the AllMusic credits.

Side one
No.	Title	Writer(s)	Lead vocals	Length
1.	"Don't Waste My Time"	Francis Rossi, Bob Young	Rossi	4:22
2.	"Oh Baby"	Rossi, Rick Parfitt	Rossi/Parfitt	4:39
3.	"A Year"	Alan Lancaster, Bernie Frost	Rossi	5:51
4.	"Unspoken Words"	Rossi, Young	Parfitt	5:06

Side two
No.	Title	Writer(s)	Lead vocals	Length
5.	"Big Fat Mama"	Rossi, Parfitt	Parfitt	5:53
6.	"Paper Plane"	Rossi, Young	Rossi	2:52
7.	"All the Reasons"	Parfitt, Lancaster	Parfitt	3:42
8.	"Roadhouse Blues"	Jim Morrison, John Densmore, Robby Krieger, Ray Manzarek	Lancaster	7:26

=== 1990 reissue bonus tracks ===
1. "Joanne" (Lancaster) (B-side of "Caroline") – 4:11
2. "Lonely Night" (Lancaster, Young, Rossi, John Coghlan, Parfitt) (B-Side of "Break the Rules") – 3:16

=== 2005 remaster bonus track ===
1. "Don't Waste My Time" [Live Version] (Rossi, Young)

=== 2014 deluxe edition bonus tracks ===
1. "Don't Waste My Time" [BBC Sounds of the Seventies 1972] – 4:24 Live
2. "Oh Baby" [BBC Sounds of the Seventies 1972] – 4:25 Live
3. "Unspoken Words" [BBC Sounds of the Seventies 1972] – 5:06 Live
4. "Paper Plane" [BBC Sounds of the Seventies 1972] – 2:59 Live
5. "Softer Ride" [BBC Sounds of the Seventies 1972] (Parfitt, Lancaster) – 4:03 Live
6. "Paper Plane" [John Peel Session 1973] – 2:57 Live
7. "Don't Waste My Time" [John Peel Session 1973] – 4:19 Live
8. "Junior's Wailing" [BBC in Concert, Paris Theatre, London 1973] – 3:35 Live
9. "Someone's Learning" [BBC in Concert, Paris Theatre, London 1973] – 8:07 Live
10. "In My Chair" [BBC in Concert, Paris Theatre, London 1973] – 3:44 Live
11. "Railroad" [BBC in Concert, Paris Theatre, London 1973] – 6:14 Live
12. "Don't Waste My Time" [BBC in Concert, Paris Theatre, London 1973] – 4:31 Live
13. "Paper Plane" [BBC in Concert, Paris Theatre, London 1973] – 3:37 Live
14. "Roadhouse Blues" [BBC in Concert, Paris Theatre, London 1973] – 15:47 Live
15. "Bye Bye Johnny" [BBC in Concert, Paris Theatre, London 1973] (Chuck Berry) – 5:14 Live

== Personnel ==
Status Quo

- Francis Rossi – guitar, vocals
- Rick Parfitt – guitar, piano, organ, vocals
- Alan Lancaster – bass, 12 string acoustic guitar, vocals
- John Coghlan – drums, percussion

Additional musicians

- Bob Young – harmonica on "Roadhouse Blues"
- Jimmy Horowitz – piano on "Roadhouse Blues"

== Charts ==
Chart (1973–75)	Peak position
Australian Albums (Kent Music Report)	16
Finnish Albums (The Official Finnish Charts)	13
German Albums (Offizielle Top 100)	31
Norwegian Albums (VG-lista)	23
UK Albums (Official Charts)	5

Chart (2014)	Peak position
Scottish Albums (Official Charts)	83

== Certifications ==
Region	Certification	Certified units/sales
Australia (ARIA)	Platinum	50,000^{^}
France (SNEP)	Gold	100,000^{*}
Sweden (GLF)	Gold	50,000^{^}
United Kingdom (BPI)	Gold	100,000^{^}
^{*} Sales figures based on certification alone.^{^} Shipments figures based on certification alone.
