= The Party Ain't Over Yet =

The Party Ain't Over Yet...

Studio album by Status Quo
- Released: 19 September 2005
- Recorded: 2005
- Genre: Hard rock, blues rock, rock and roll
- Length: 55:03
- Label: Sanctuary
- Producer: Mike Paxman

Status Quo chronology
XS All Areas - The Greatest Hits (2004)	The Party Ain't Over Yet... (2005)	In Search of the Fourth Chord (2007)

Professional ratings
Review scores
Source	Rating
Allmusic	4/5 stars

The Party Ain't Over Yet... is the twenty-seventh album by British rock band Status Quo, released 19 September 2005. A DVD documentary on the making of the album and the band's history to that point, The Party Ain't Over Yet...40 Years of Status Quo, was also released in 2005.

== Track listing ==
1. "The Party Ain't Over Yet" (John David) 3:50
2. "Gotta Get Up and Go" (Francis Rossi, Bob Young) 4:18
3. "All That Counts Is Love" (John David) 3:41
4. "Familiar Blues" (Rick Parfitt, Andy Bown) 5:09
5. "The Bubble" (Andy Bown, John Edwards) 5:36
6. "Belavista Man" (Rick Parfitt, John Edwards) 4:21
7. "Nevashooda" (Andy Bown, Matt Letley) 3:52
8. "Velvet Train" (John Edwards, Andy Bown) 3:33
9. "Goodbye Baby" (Francis Rossi, Bob Young) 4:08
10. "You Never Stop" (Francis Rossi, Rick Parfitt, Andy Bown, John Edwards, Matt Letley) 4:33
11. "Kick Me When I'm Down" (John David, Webb Wilder) 3:17
12. "Cupid Stupid" (Francis Rossi, Bob Young) 3:51
13. "This Is Me" (Rick Parfitt, John Edwards) 4:47

Australia Tour Edition bonus disc

1. "The Party Ain't Over Yet" [single mix] (John David) 3:52
2. "Belavista Man" [live at Emden] (Rick Parfitt, John Edwards) 4:27
3. "I Ain't Ready" (Francis Rossi, Bob Young) 4:34
4. "I'm Watching over You" (Francis Rossi, Bob Young) 3:49
5. "Gerdundula" [live at Liverpool Pops] (Francis Rossi, Bob Young) 6:45
6. "Mystery Medley" [live at Liverpool Pops] 10:05
  1. "Mystery Song" (Rick Parfitt, Bob Young)
  2. "Railroad" (Francis Rossi, Bob Young)
  3. "Most Of The Time" (Francis Rossi, Bob Young)
  4. "Wild Side Of Life" (William Warren, Arlie A. Carter)
  5. "Rollin' Home" (Alan Lancaster, Francis Rossi)
  6. "Again And Again" (Rick Parfitt, Andy Bown, Jackie Lynton)
  7. "Slow Train" (Francis Rossi, Bob Young)
7. The Party Ain't Over Yet [promo video] (John David) 4:20
8. The Party Ain't Over Yet [photo gallery] (John David)

== Personnel ==
- Francis Rossi - Vocals & lead guitar
- Rick Parfitt - Vocals & guitar
- John Edwards - Bass
- Andy Bown - Keyboards
- Matt Letley - Drums

Recorded at Jacobs Studios

== Charts ==
Chart (2005)	Peak position
Dutch Albums (Album Top 100)	65
French Albums (SNEP)	184
German Albums (Offizielle Top 100)	19
Scottish Albums (OCC)	16
Swedish Albums (Sverigetopplistan)	17
Swiss Albums (Schweizer Hitparade)	21
UK Albums (OCC)	18
UK Independent Albums (OCC)	3
