= All That Counts Is Love =

Single by Status Quo

from the album The Party Ain't Over Yet
- Released: 31 October 2005
- Genre: Rock
- Length: 3:41
- Label: Sanctuary Records
- Songwriter(s): John David
- Producer(s): Mike Paxman

Status Quo singles chronology
"The Party Ain't Over Yet" (2005)	"All That Counts Is Love" (2005)	"Beginning of the End" (2007)

"All That Counts Is Love" is a single released by the British rock band Status Quo in 2005. It was included on the album The Party Ain't Over Yet.

== Track listing ==
1. "All That Counts Is Love" (John David) (Radio Mix) 3:41
2. "Belavista Man" (Live) (Parfitt/Edwards) 4:27
3. "The Party Ain't Over Yet" (Live) (John David) 3:51

== Charts ==
Chart (2005)	Peak position
UK Singles Chart	29
