= Ma Kelly's Greasy Spoon =

Studio album by Status Quo
- Released: 28 August 1970
- Recorded: Spring 1970
- Studio: Pye (London, UK)
- Genre: Hard rock, blues rock
- Length: 41:48
- Label: Pye
- Producer: John Schroeder

Status Quo chronology
Spare Parts (1969)	Ma Kelly's Greasy Spoon (1970)	Dog of Two Head (1971)

Professional ratings
Review scores
Source	Rating
AllMusic	3/5 stars

Ma Kelly's Greasy Spoon is the third studio album by the British rock band Status Quo, released in August 1970. It was the first album by the band to leave behind their early psychedelic sound and begin moving towards hard rock, and the last album to feature keyboardist Roy Lynes. Although the album's release was bookended by two non-album singles which reached the UK top 30, the album failed to chart in the UK.

== Background ==
The band began experimenting with a new sound when they hired Australian singer-songwriter Carl Groszmann to write a song for them. That song became "Down the Dustpipe", released as a non-album single in March 1970, with the Francis Rossi/Rick Parfitt song "Face Without a Soul" – from the band's previous album Spare Parts – as its B-side. The song, remarked Rossi, “was the [first] to feature our soon-to-be trademark boogie shuffle” and became one of the most popular numbers in their live set. The single took the media by surprise as it was so different in sound from their previous work. BBC Radio 1 presenter Tony Blackburn dismissed it on-air the first time he played it with the comment, "Down the dustbin for this one." Nevertheless, it was an instant hit, reaching #12 in the UK charts and remaining in the top 50 for 17 weeks.

While on tour the same year, organist Roy Lynes left the band. He could see how serious the other members were about fame and glory, but he had fallen in love and wanted to settle down. According to the group's producer, John Schroeder, who wrote the booklet notes for the 3-CD compilation The Early Years, Lynes was "the quietest member of the group" and "somehow always seemed to be the odd one out". Parfitt has said Lynes was "a bit laid back, the Open University type who liked tinkering and finding out about things", and Rossi remarked that, when Lynes showed up at a gig in New Zealand about ten years later to say hello, "he seemed a much happier bloke."

In October 1970, two months after the album's release, the band released another non-album single, the Rossi/Young composition "In My Chair", with the non-album B-side "Gerdundula" (written while in Germany by Rossi and Young under the pseudonyms Manston and James, with a title reportedly inspired by their German friends Gerd and Ula). It earned the band another hit, reaching #21. "Gerdundula" would be re-recorded for their next album, Dog of Two Head.

"Just so right and so tight," observed Pavement's Stephen Malkmus of Ma Kelly's Greasy Spoon. "As with Dog of Two Head from the year after, this record is transitional: it's the man-steps towards their interchangeable album phase of pure-denim-heads-down-choogle, and never gets boring. Smooth voices over solid grooves. If it was a place, I wish I was there."

The album was released in an exclusive mono mix in Argentina where the LP was called 'Everything'.

== Track listing ==
Side one

1. "Spinning Wheel Blues" (Francis Rossi, Bob Young) – 3:21 (listed as "Spinning Wheel" on the original LP)
2. "Daughter" (Alan Lancaster) – 3:01
3. "Everything" (Rossi, Rick Parfitt) – 2:36
4. "Shy Fly" (Rossi, Young) – 3:49
5. "(April) Spring, Summer and Wednesdays" (Rossi, Young) – 4:12

Side two

1. "Junior's Wailing" (Kieran White, Martin Pugh) – 3:33
2. "Lakky Lady" (Rossi, Parfitt) – 3:14
3. "Need Your Love" (Rossi, Young) – 4:46
4. "Lazy Poker Blues" (Peter Green, Clifford Adams) – 3:37
5. "Is it Really Me/Gotta Go Home" (Lancaster) – 9:34

=== 1998 remaster bonus tracks ===
11. "In My Chair" (Alternate Mix) – 3:34
12. "Gerdundula" (Alternate Mix) (Young, Rossi) – 4:10
13. "Down the Dustpipe" (Alternate Mix) – 2:08
14. "Junior's Wailing" (Alternate Mix) – 3:36

=== 2003 reissue bonus tracks ===
11. "Is it Really Me/Gotta Go Home" (Early Rough Mix) (Lancaster) – 6:54
12. "Daughter" (Early Working Mix for Poss. Guitar) (Lancaster) – 2:57
13. "Down the Dustpipe" (7") (Carl Groszman) – 2:06
14. "In My Chair" (7") (Francis Rossi, Bob Young) – 3:19
15. "Gerdundula" (7" Original Version) (Manston, James) – 3:23
16. "Down the Dustpipe" (BBC Session) (Groszman) – 1:49
17. "Junior's Wailing" (BBC Session) (White, Pugh) – 3:01
18. "Spinning Wheel Blues" (BBC Session) (Rossi, Young) – 2:17
19. "Need Your Love" (BBC Session) (Rossi, Young) – 2:29
20. "In My Chair" (1979 Pye Promo Flexidisc) (Rossi, Young) – 1:37

The BBC Sessions were recorded at BBC Studio 1, Shepherd's Bush October 1970 for The John Peel Show

== Personnel ==
Status Quo

- Francis Rossi – guitar, lead vocals
- Rick Parfitt – guitar, backing vocals, lead vocals on "Is It Really Me / Gotta Go Now"
- Alan Lancaster – bass, guitar, backing vocals, lead vocals on "Junior's Wailing"
- John Coghlan – drums
- Roy Lynes – organ, acoustic and electric piano

with:

- unknown – cello on "Everything"
- Bob Young – harmonica on "Spinning Wheel Blues"

== Charts ==
Chart (2020)	Peak position
UK Independent Albums (OCC)	28
