= Don't Stop (Status Quo album) =

Studio album by Status Quo
- Released: 5 February 1996
- Recorded: 1995
- Genre: Hard rock, rock and roll, pop rock
- Length: 56:02
- Label: Polydor
- Producer: Pip Williams

Status Quo chronology
| Thirsty Work (1994) | Don't Stop (1996) | Whatever You Want – The Very Best of Status Quo (1997) |

Professional ratings
Review scores
| Source | Rating |
|---|---|
| AllMusic | 2.5/5 stars |

Don't Stop is the twenty-second studio album by British rock band Status Quo. A covers album, it includes guest appearances from Tessa Niles on tracks six and 14, the Beach Boys on track one, Brian May of Queen on track seven, and Maddy Prior of Steeleye Span on track 15.

"Fun, Fun, Fun", "When You Walk In The Room", "Don't Stop" and "All Around My Hat" were all released as singles, and although only the first of these reached the British Top 30, the album entered the chart at No. 2 in the first week of a three-month stay, making it the band's highest-charting studio album of the 1990s, and tying with the 1990 greatest hits album Rocking All Over The Years (which also reached No. 2) as their highest-charting overall album of that decade.

== Track listing ==
1. "Fun, Fun, Fun" (Brian Wilson, Mike Love) – with the Beach Boys – 4:03
2. "When You Walk in the Room" (Jackie DeShannon) – 4:05
3. "I Can Hear the Grass Grow" (Roy Wood) – 3:27
4. "You Never Can Tell" (Chuck Berry) – 3:50
5. "Get Back" (John Lennon, Paul McCartney) – 3:23
6. "The Safety Dance" (Ivan Doroschuk) – 3:56 – with Tessa Niles
7. "Raining in My Heart" (Felice Bryant, Boudleaux Bryant) – with Brian May – 3:32
8. "Don't Stop" (Christine McVie) – 3:40
9. "Sorrow" (Bob Feldman, Jerry Goldstein, Gottehrer) – 4:14
10. "Proud Mary" (John Fogerty) – 3:30
11. "Lucille" (Al Collins, Little Richard) – 2:58
12. "Johnny and Mary" (Robert Palmer) – 3:35
13. "Get Out Of Denver" (Bob Seger) – 4:09
14. "The Future's So Bright (I Gotta Wear Shades)" (Pat MacDonald) – 3:36 – with Tessa Niles
15. "All Around My Hat" (traditional, arrangement by Francis Rossi, Rick Parfitt, Andrew Bown, John 'Rhino' Edwards, Jeff Rich) – with Maddy Prior – 3:56

=== 2006 remaster bonus tracks ===
1. "Tilting At The Mill" (Bown, Rossi, Parfitt, Edwards, Rich)
2. "Mortified" (Bown, Rossi, Parfitt, Edwards, Rich)
3. "Temporary Friend" (Bown, Rossi, Parfitt, Edwards, Rich)
4. "I'll Never Get Over You" (Mills)

== Personnel ==
Status Quo

- Francis Rossi – vocals, lead guitar
- Rick Parfitt – vocals, guitar
- Andy Bown – keyboards
- John Edwards – bass, backing vocals
- Jeff Rich – drums, percussion

Additional musicians

- Gary Barnacle – saxophone on "Fun, Fun, Fun", "Get Back", "Sorrow", "Proud Mary" and "Get Out Of Denver"
- John Thirkell – trumpet on "Fun, Fun, Fun", "Get Back", "Sorrow", "Proud Mary" and "Get Out Of Denver"
- Geraint Watkins – accordion on "You Never Can Tell" and "Safety Dance"
- Troy Donockley – Uilleann Pipes, whistles on "All Around My Hat"
- Pip Williams – brass arrangements on "Get Back", "Proud Mary" and "Get Out Of Denver"

== Charts ==
| Chart (1996) | Peak position |
|---|---|
| Belgian Albums (Ultratop Flanders) | 29 |
| Dutch Albums (Album Top 100) | 88 |
| German Albums (Offizielle Top 100) | 42 |
| Scottish Albums (OCC) | 3 |
| Swedish Albums (Sverigetopplistan) | 14 |
| Swiss Albums (Schweizer Hitparade) | 28 |
| UK Albums (OCC) | 2 |
| UK Rock & Metal Albums (OCC) | 1 |

== Certifications ==
| Region | Certification | Certified units/sales |
|---|---|---|
| United Kingdom (BPI) | Gold | 100,000^{^} |
^{^} Shipments figures based on certification alone.
