= Picturesque Matchstickable Messages from the Status Quo =

Studio album by The Status Quo
- Released: 27 September 1968
- Recorded: January – September 1968
- Studios: Pye (London, UK)
- Genres: Psychedelic rock; psychedelic pop
- Length: 34:00
- Label: Pye
- Producer: John Schroeder

The Status Quo chronology
Picturesque Matchstickable Messages from the Status Quo (1968)	Spare Parts (1969)

Singles from Picturesque Matchstickable Messages from the Status Quo
- 1. "Pictures of Matchstick Men" Released: 5 January 1968; 2. "Black Veils of Melancholy" Released: 29 March 1968; 3. "Ice in the Sun" Released: 26 July 1968

Professional ratings
Review scores
Source	Rating
AllMusic	4/5 stars

Picturesque Matchstickable Messages from the Status Quo is the debut studio album by the British rock band Status Quo, released in September 1968.

== Background ==
The album's lead single was originally intended to be "Gentleman Joe's Sidewalk Café", with the original song by singer/lead guitarist Francis Rossi, "Pictures of Matchstick Men", as the B-side, but these songs were eventually swapped. It reached No. 7 in the UK, and remains the band's only major hit single in the US, where it reached No. 12. It also reached No. 8 in Canada. A second single, Rossi's "Black Veils of Melancholy" (with organist Roy Lynes' non-album track "To Be Free" as the B-side), flopped and has even been called "a carbon copy of "Pictures of Matchstick Men"". The third single, "Ice in the Sun", was written for the band by Marty Wilde and Ronnie Scott (not the jazz musician), with "When My Mind Is Not Live", a collaboration between Rossi and rhythm guitarist/singer Rick Parfitt, as the B-side. It reached No. 8 in the UK, and No. 29 in Canada.

The album itself was released on 27 September 1968, and failed to make the UK album charts. The band planned to release a fourth single from the album, "Technicolour Dreams" backed with the Wilde/Scott composition "Paradise Flat", but this was cancelled in the UK with pressed copies being sold abroad. The band then released a new non-album single, Rossi and Parfitt's "Make Me Stay a Bit Longer" with bassist Alan Lancaster's "Auntie Nellie" as the B-side, on 31 January 1969. The last record to credit the band as The Status Quo (all subsequent releases were simply credited Status Quo), "Make Me Stay a Bit Longer" received good reviews but failed to chart.

== Track listing ==
Side one

1. "Black Veils of Melancholy" (Francis Rossi) – 3:17
2. "When My Mind Is Not Live" (Rossi, Rick Parfitt) – 2:50
3. "Ice in the Sun" (Marty Wilde, Ronnie Scott) – 2:13
4. "Elizabeth Dreams" (Wilde, Scott) – 3:29
5. "Gentleman Joe's Sidewalk Café" (Kenny Young) – 3:01
6. "Paradise Flat" (Wilde, Scott) – 3:13

Side two

1. "Technicolor Dreams" (Anthony King) – 2:54
2. "Spicks and Specks" (Barry Gibb) – 2:46
3. "Sheila" (Tommy Roe) – 1:56 (not on US version)
4. "Sunny Cellophane Skies" (Alan Lancaster) – 2:47
5. "Green Tambourine" (Paul Leka, Shelley Pinz) – 2:19 (not on US version)
6. "Pictures of Matchstick Men" (Rossi) – 3:13

=== 1998 remaster bonus tracks ===
1. To Be Free (Non Album B-Side)
2. Pictures Of Matchstick Men (Stereo Alternate Mix)
3. Paradise Flat (Stereo Alternate Mix)

=== 2003 Deluxe edition ===
disc one - mono LP
No.	Title	Length
1.	"Black Veils of Melancholy" (mono version)	3:17
2.	"When my Mind is not Live" (mono version)	2:51
3.	"Ice in the Sun" (mono version)	2:13
4.	"Elizabeth Dreams" (mono version)	3:29
5.	"Gentleman Joe's Sidewalk Café" (mono version)	3:02
6.	"Paradise Flat" (mono version)	3:13
7.	"Technicolour Dreams" (mono version)	2:54
8.	"Sheila" (mono version)	1:57
9.	"Spicks and Specks" (mono version)	2:46
10.	"Sunny Cellophane Skies" (mono version)	2:47
11.	"Green Tambourine" (mono version)	2:19
12.	"Pictures of Matchstick Men" (mono version)	3:14
13.	"To Be Free" (B-side)	2:38
14.	"Make me Stay a Bit Longer" (A-side)	2:56
15.	"Auntie Nellie" (B-side)	3:22
16.	"interview with Brian Matthew" (BBC session)	1:08
17.	"Pictures of Matchstick Men" (BBC session)	3:13
18.	"Things Get Better (Al Jackson, Eddie Floyd, Steve Cropper)" (BBC session)	2:11
19.	"Spicks and Specks" (BBC session)	2:48
20.	"Judy in Disguise (with Glasses) (Andrew Joseph Bernard, John Fred Gourrier)" (BBC session)	2:45
21.	"(another) interview" (BBC session)	1:19
22.	"Make me Stay a Bit Longer" (BBC session)	2:48

disc two - stereo LP remixed "Proper"
No.	Title	Length
23.	"Black Veils of Melancholy" (stereo remix)	3:17
24.	"When my Mind is not Live" (stereo remix)	3:03
25.	"Ice in the Sun" (stereo remix)	2:15
26.	"Elizabeth Dreams" (stereo remix)	3:49
27.	"Gentleman Joe's Sidewalk Café" (stereo remix)	3:02
28.	"Paradise Flat" (stereo remix)	3:16
29.	"Technicolour Dreams" (stereo remix)	3:19
30.	"Sheila" (stereo remix)	1:58
31.	"Spicks and Specks" (stereo remix)	2:54
32.	"Sunny Cellophane Skies" (stereo remix)	2:49
33.	"Green Tambourine" (stereo remix)	2:21
34.	"Pictures of Matchstick Men" (stereo remix)	3:17
35.	"Auntie Nellie" (bonus track)	3:34
36.	"Gloria (Van Morrison)" (BBC session, the Spectres)	2:47
37.	"Interview with Francis Rossi" (BBC session, the Spectres)	0:49
38.	"I (who have Nothing)" (BBC session, the Spectres)	3:03
39.	"Neighbour, Neighbour (Alton Joseph Valier)" (BBC session, the Spectres)	2:39
40.	"I don't want You (Brian Potter, Pete Dello)" (BBC session, Traffic Jam)	2:34
41.	"Almost but not Quite There" (BBC session, Traffic Jam)	2:38
42.	"Spicks and Specks" (BBC session, Traffic Jam)	2:47
43.	"Gloria" (BBC session, the Status Quo)	2:43
44.	"interview with Alan Lancaster" (BBC session, the Status Quo)	1:01
45.	"Black Veils of Melancholy" (BBC session, the Status Quo)	3:14
46.	"Bloodhound (Larry Bright)" (BBC session, the Status Quo)	2:05

== Personnel ==
Status Quo

- Francis Rossi - lead guitar, lead & backing vocals
- Rick Parfitt - rhythm guitar, backing vocals, lead vocals (track 2, 4, 6)
- Alan Lancaster - bass guitar, vocals
- John Coghlan - drums
- Roy Lynes - organ, vocals
