= Are You Growing Tired of My Love =

Single by Status Quo

from the album Spare Parts
- B-side: "So Ends Another Life"
- Released: 25 April 1969
- Genre: Psychedelic rock
- Length: 3:33
- Label: Pye
- Songwriter: Anthony King
- Producer: John Schroeder

Status Quo singles chronology
"Make Me Stay a Bit Longer" (1969)	"Are You Growing Tired of My Love" (1969)	"The Price of Love" (1969)

"Are You Growing Tired of My Love" is a single released by the British rock band Status Quo in 1969. It was included on the album Spare Parts.

"Are You Growing Tired of My Love" is a ballad written by songwriter Anthony King. It was the first single to feature Rick Parfitt singing lead vocals.

Nancy Sinatra covered "Are You Growing Tired of My Love" as the B-side of her single "The Highway Song", later included on the 1996 reissue of her album Country My Way.

== Track listing ==
1. "Are You Growing Tired of My Love" (A. King) (3.33)
2. "So Ends Another Life" (Lancaster) (3.10)

== Chart position ==
Chart (1969)	Peak position
UK Singles (OCC)	46
