= Caroline (Status Quo song) =

Single by Status Quo

from the album Hello!
- B-side: "Joanne"
- Released: 31 August 1973
- Genre: Rock; boogie rock
- Length: 3:43
- Label: Vertigo
- Songwriter(s): Francis Rossi, Bob Young
- Producer(s): Status Quo

Status Quo singles chronology
"Gerdundula" (1973)	"Caroline" (1973)	"Break the Rules" (1974)

Official audio
- "Caroline" on YouTube

Status Quo singles chronology
"She Don't Fool Me" (1982)	"Caroline (live)" (1982)	"Ol' Rag Blues" (1983)

"Caroline" is a single released by the British rock band Status Quo in 1973. It was included on the band's 1973 album Hello!

== Background and release ==
The song was written by band leader Francis Rossi and roadie / harmonica player Bob Young on a table napkin in the dining room of a hotel in Perranporth, Cornwall, in 1971. A demo was cut with Rossi playing guitar and bass, with Terry Williams on drums. The group changed the arrangement from a slow blues song, doubling the tempo, and recorded it mostly live using their stage gear and amplifiers. On the single release, the song fades out, while the album version is about thirty seconds longer and has a conclusive ending.

The song became one of the opening numbers in Quo's live setlist for over 25 years. It was the second number played at their Live Aid gig in 1985 and it inspired Apollo 440's 1999 single "Stop the Rock".

The song was reprised, in 2014, for the band's thirty-first studio album Aquostic (Stripped Bare). It was featured in the ninety-minute launch performance of the album at London's Roundhouse on 22 October, the concert being recorded and broadcast live by BBC Radio 2 as part of their In Concert series.

Another re-recorded version of the song appears on the band's 2003 album Riffs.

== Singles ==
- 1973: "Caroline" (Rossi/Young) (3.43) / "Joanne" (Lancaster) (4.06) 45 rpm Vinyl 7", Vertigo / 6059 085 Germany, United Kingdom
- 1985: "Caroline" / "Down Down" 45 rpm Vinyl 7", Old Gold / OG 9566 United Kingdom

== Album tracks ==
- 1973, on the vinyl album Hello! - track 5, 4:16.
- 2003, on the album Riffs, track 1, 4:54 (re-recorded version)
- 2014, on the album Aquostic (Stripped Bare), track 8, 3:13 (acoustic version)
- 2015, on the CD album Hello!, CD1, track 5, 4:16; the 2015 re-issue bonus disc has four different versions: original demo fast, original demo slow, mono version and stereo version.

== Charts ==
=== Original release ===
Chart (1973)	Peak position
Australian Singles (Kent Music Report)	31
Belgium (Ultratop 50 Wallonia)	49
French Singles (SNEP)	63
Germany (GfK)	36
Ireland (IRMA)	11
UK Singles (OCC)	5

=== Live version ===
Chart (1982)	Peak position
Ireland (IRMA)	12
UK Singles (OCC)	13

== Certifications ==
Region	Certification	Certified units/sales
United Kingdom (BPI)	Gold	500,000^{^}
^{^} Shipments figures based on certification alone.
