= Down Down =

- Artwork for Dutch vinyl release

Single by Status Quo

from the album On the Level
- B-side: "Nightride"
- Released: 29 November 1974
- Genre: Rock; hard rock; boogie rock
- Length: 3:49 (single version); 5:24 (album version)
- Label: Vertigo
- Songwriters: Francis Rossi; Bob Young
- Producer: Status Quo

Status Quo singles chronology
"Break the Rules" (1974)	"Down Down" (1974)	"Roll Over Lay Down" (1975)

Video
- "Down Down" on TopPop on YouTube

"Down Down" is a song by English rock band Status Quo, released by Vertigo Records on 29 November 1974. Written by Francis Rossi and Bob Young and produced by Status Quo, "Down Down" was Status Quo's only number one single on the UK Singles Chart. The single spent a week at the top of the chart in January 1975. Both "Down Down" and its B-side "Nightride" were taken from the album On the Level (1975), which had yet to be released. The album version lasts 5 minutes and 24 seconds, whilst the single version is 3 minutes and 49 seconds.

== Song information ==
"Down Down" was inspired by T. Rex's debut single "Debora". Originally it was titled "Get Down", but this was changed before release, possibly to avoid confusion with the Gilbert O'Sullivan song of the same name.

Towards the end of his life, DJ John Peel was known for playing "Down Down" as part of his eclectic DJ sets.

In 1986 co-writer Bob Young recorded a country style version of the song to open his solo album In Quo Country.

In July 2012, Status Quo reworked the lyrics to create a three-minute promotional song for the Australian supermarket chain Coles. The chorus chants, "down down, prices are down". This was released on television and YouTube, the most notable of which depicted a mince rally.

The song was reprised, in 2014, for the band's thirty-first studio album Aquostic – Stripped Bare. It was featured in the ninety-minute launch performance of the album at London's Roundhouse on 22 October and recorded and broadcast live by BBC Radio 2 as part of their In Concert series.

== Charts ==
=== Weekly charts ===
Chart (1975)	Peak position
Australia (Kent Music Report)	4
Austria (Ö3 Austria Top 40)	14
Belgium (Ultratop 50 Flanders)	1
Belgium (Ultratop 50 Wallonia)	9
Netherlands (Dutch Top 40)	2
Netherlands (Single Top 100)	1
Norway (VG-lista)	8
Switzerland (Schweizer Hitparade)	2
UK Singles (OCC)	1
West Germany (GfK)	7

=== Year-end charts ===
Chart (1975)	Position
Australia (Kent Music Report)	15
Belgium (Ultratop Flanders)	18
Netherlands (Dutch Top 40)	13
Netherlands (Single Top 100)	14
Germany (Official German Charts)	27
Switzerland (Schweizer Hitparade)	11

== Certifications ==
Region	Certification	Certified units/sales
United Kingdom (BPI)	Silver	250,000^{^}
^{^} Shipments figures based on certification alone.
