= Dog of Two Head =

Studio album by Status Quo
- Released: 5 November 1971
- Studio: Pye (London, UK)
- Genre: Hard rock, blues rock
- Length: 36:09
- Label: Pye NSPL 18371
- Producer: John Schroeder

Status Quo chronology
Ma Kelly's Greasy Spoon (1970)	Dog of Two Head (1971)	Piledriver (1972)

Singles from Dog of Two Head
- 1. "Mean Girl" Released: 1973; 2. "Gerdundula" Released: 1973

Dog of Two Head is the fourth studio album by the British rock band Status Quo, released by Pye Records in November 1971.

== Background ==
Following the departure of Roy Lynes, this was the first album to feature the four-piece lineup of remaining members Francis Rossi (credited on the sleeve as Mike Rossi), Rick Parfitt (credited as Ritchie Parfitt), Alan Lancaster and John Coghlan (credited as John Coughlan). They had released a non-album single that March, a Rossi/Young song called "Tune to the Music", but it was not a hit. The band then set to work writing and recording a new album. A couple of the songs, such as the opening track "Umleitung" (German for 'diversion'), had been written the previous year.

No singles were initially released from the album. Following the success of their next album Piledriver and its single "Paper Plane", Rossi and Young's "Mean Girl" from Dog of Two Head was released as a single and become a UK #20 hit in April 1973. When "Mean Girl" charted, the record company decided to release another single from the album, "Gerdundula". This was released in July 1973, and failed to chart. The B-side to this single was Rossi and Parfitt's "Lakky Lady", taken from Ma Kelly's Greasy Spoon.

== Reception ==
Professional ratings
Review scores
Source	Rating
AllMusic	4/5 stars

AllMusic largely praised the album's unusual stylistics in their retrospective review, commenting that Status Quo "were going to find their characteristic sound in their posterior effort, Piledriver, but never again were they going to sound as innovative and inventive as they sound here."

== Track listing ==
All songs written by Francis Rossi and Bob Young, except where noted. "Gerdundula" was written by the duo under the pseudonyms Manston and James.

Side one

1. "Umleitung" (Alan Lancaster, Roy Lynes) – 7:11
2. "Nanana (Extraction I)" – 0:51
3. "Something's Going on in My Head" (Lancaster) – 4:44
4. "Mean Girl" – 3:53
5. "Nanana (Extraction II)" – 1:11

Side two

1. "Gerdundula" – 3:49
2. "Railroad" – 5:30
3. "Someone's Learning" (Lancaster) – 7:08
4. "Nanana" – 2:26

=== 1998 remaster bonus tracks ===
1. "Tune to the Music" (previously unreleased version) – 3:36
2. "Good Thinking" (previously unreleased version) – 3:40
3. "Time to Fly" (Lancaster) – 4:18
4. "Nanana" (previously unreleased version) – 2:58
5. "Mean Girl" (previously unreleased version) – 3:58

=== 2003 reissue bonus tracks ===
1. "Mean Girl" (early mix) – 3:58
2. "Tune to the Music" – 3:09
3. "Good Thinking" (Rossi, Rick Parfitt, Lancaster, John Coghlan, Young) – 3:43
4. "Mean Girl" (BBC session)
5. "Railroad" (BBC session)

== Personnel ==
Status Quo

- Francis Rossi – lead guitar, acoustic guitar, lead vocals
- Rick Parfitt – rhythm guitar, acoustic guitar, piano, backing vocals, co-lead vocals on "Railroad"
- Alan Lancaster – bass, guitar, backing vocals
- John Coghlan – drums, percussion

Additional personnel

- Bob Young – harmonica
- Bruce Foster – piano
- Grass – backing vocals on "Nanana"
