= Whatever You Want (Status Quo song) =

- Standard artwork for most territorial releases, including the UK vinyl single

Single by Status Quo

from the album Whatever You Want
- B-side: "Hard Ride"
- Released: 14 September 1979
- Genre: Rock; boogie rock
- Length: 4:00
- Label: Vertigo
- Songwriters: Rick Parfitt, Andy Bown

Status Quo singles chronology
"Accident Prone" (1978)	"Whatever You Want" (1979)	"Living on an Island" (1979)

Audio sample
- file; help

"Whatever You Want" is a rock song by the British rock band Status Quo. Written by Rick Parfitt and Andy Bown, it was released on the album of the same name in 1979 and has become one of the band's better-known works. The track peaked at number 4 on the UK charts on 30 September 1979. It was later re-recorded for their 2003 album Riffs.

== Composition ==
The song commences with a quiet introduction, containing a guitar playing notes from chords. Rick Parfitt and Francis Rossi used chorus, fuzz and flanging effects on their guitars. This lasts for approximately 26 seconds, and fades out towards the end. After this, the guitar picks up once more with a D-minor riff, and 40 seconds into the piece, the familiar D-major riff of the song begins, accompanied by drums from the 56 second mark.

At 1 minute, 11 seconds, all audio pauses for approximately half a second; at this point, the lyrical portion commences. The music returns as soon as the first lyrics are heard. This pause creates a short-lived dramatic start to the song, which lasts for a total of four minutes.

== Impact ==
In the United Kingdom, the song reached number 4 in the UK Singles Chart in 1979.

In 2013 the band themselves appeared in an Australian television advertisement for Vegemite at the Coles Supermarkets chain, with the song as the backing track, as part of the store's "Down Down" campaign.

The song was reprised, in 2014, for the band's thirty-first studio album Aquostic (Stripped Bare). It was featured in the ninety-minute launch performance of the album at London's Roundhouse on 22 October, the concert being recorded and broadcast live by BBC Radio 2 as part of their In Concert series.

A sample of the song was played during an episode of Doctor Who Confidential programme called Arthurian Legend where Matt Smith was pointing at Arthur Darvill ponytail in reference to Status Quo lead singer Francis Rossi.

== Arrangement ==
The song is guitar-oriented, like most Status Quo songs. During recording up to three guitar 'layers' were used, though it can be played with two: rhythm guitar and solo guitar. The other instruments are a bass guitar, keyboards and drums. The lyrics are multi-vocal; for instance the 'Whatever you want' part is sung entirely with two voices.

The guitar low 'E' string is tuned to a D (the song is in the key of D). This is required to play the intro and also the low strumming after the intro. In this later part a flanger effect is used together with the ever-present overdrive/distortion effect.

== Charts ==
Chart (1979)	Peak position
Australian Singles (Kent Music Report)	22
Austria (Ö3 Austria Top 40)	11
Belgium (Ultratop 50 Flanders)	4
Germany (GfK)	12
Ireland (IRMA)	5
Netherlands (Single Top 100)	5
UK Singles (OCC)	4

== Certifications ==
Region	Certification	Certified units/sales
Spain (PROMUSICAE)	Gold	30,000^{‡}
United Kingdom (BPI)	Silver	250,000^{^}
^{^} Shipments figures based on certification alone.^{‡} Sales+streaming figures based on certification alone.
