= John Coghlan (drummer) =

English drummer

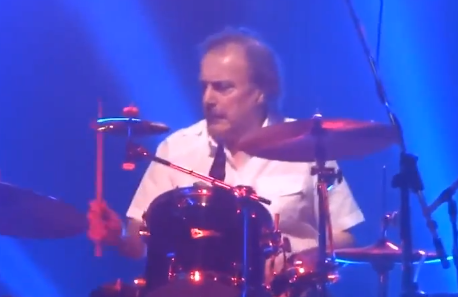
- Coghlan in 2013, performing with Status Quo in Manchester

Background information
- Also known as: Spud
- Born: John Robert Coghlan; 19 September 1946 (age 79); Dulwich, London, England
- Origin: London, England
- Genres: Hard rock; rock and roll; blues rock; boogie rock; psychedelic rock
- Occupation: Musician
- Instrument: Drums
- Years active: 1962–present
- Website: johncoghlan.com

John Robert Coghlan (born 19 September 1946) is an English musician. He is best known as the original drummer of the rock band Status Quo.

== Early life ==
The son of a Glasgow-born father and a London-born half-French mother, Coghlan grew up in Dulwich and was educated at Kingsdale Comprehensive School. He left school at 15 to begin an apprenticeship as a mechanic. He attended drumming tuition under Lloyd Ryan, who also taught Phil Collins the drum rudiments.

== Status Quo ==
Coghlan joined Status Quo, then called the Paladins (later the Spectres), in early 1962 after a meeting with bassist Alan Lancaster, guitarist Francis Rossi and keyboard player Jess Jaworski. "The three of them were playing away through a single Vox AC30 amplifier," he recalled. "But it sounded amazing and that was the start of it all."

In August 1967, they officially became "the Status Quo". Their break through as the Status Quo came in 1968 with the song "Pictures of Matchstick Men". The song went to number seven in the UK, and number 12 in the US.

Coghlan played on the first fourteen Quo albums, including their first and most successful live album, Live! in 1977.

Quo's hit singles from the band in the 1970s/1980s, with peak UK chart position and year, include: "Paper Plane" (No. 8 in 1972), "Caroline" (No. 5 in 1973), "Break The Rules" (No. 8 in 1974), "Down Down" (No. 1 in 1975), "Roll Over Lay Down" (No. 10 in 1975), "Rain" (No. 7 in 1976), "Mystery Song" (No. 11 in 1976), "Wild Side of Life" (No. 9 in 1976), "Rockin' All Over the World" (No. 3 in 1977), "Again and Again" (No. 13 in 1978), "Whatever You Want" (No. 4 in 1979), "Living on an Island" (No. 16 in 1979), "What You're Proposing" (No. 2 in 1980), the double A-side "Lies" and "Don't Drive My Car" (No. 11 in 1980), "Somethin' 'Bout You Baby I Like" (No. 9 in 1981) and "Rock 'n' Roll" (No. 8 in 1981). "Down Down" topped the UK singles chart in January 1975, becoming their only UK No. 1 single to date.

While Quo were recording what became their 1+9+8+2 album, Coghlan unexpectedly quit after almost twenty years of being in the line-up. According to Francis Rossi and Rick Parfitt, Coghlan went into the studio, sat behind his kit, "tapped around" on it, "then he got up, kicked the whole kit apart, walked out and that was that."

"It had been creeping up on me," the drummer explained. "I always felt that we never got enough rest; there were parties every night… Also, things weren't happy for me at home in those days, and nobody in the band was too interested in anybody else's problems… It was such a shame, because the original band were shit-hot and we allowed it to fall apart… Alan [Lancaster] told everybody when I left the room that I'd be back the next day. In fact, I was on a plane, going home."

Coghlan was replaced by Pete Kircher, formerly of the 1960s band Honeybus.

== Post-Status Quo ==
Coghlan subsequently formed Partners in Crime with singer Noel McCalla; the band released one album, Organised Crime in 1985, but failed to earn major attention. He also played on a one-off single by the Rockers, a supergroup also featuring Roy Wood, Phil Lynott and Chas Hodges. Their "We Are The Boys (Who Make All The Noise)", a rock and roll medley, was released in November 1983 and made No. 79 in the chart. His own band, John Coghlan's Diesel, was a loose ensemble of musicians he had known in his years with Quo, notably Bob Young and Andy Bown. Diesel never signed a proper recording contract.

=== John Coghlan's Quo ===
Coghlan continued to play in his own solo bands mostly known as John Coghlan's Quo, and also with members from other bands, including members from well known Quo tribute acts, including Rick Abbs (Dog of Two Head) Mick Hughes from Predatur. He also leads the John Coghlan Band, or JCB, which comprises the members of the 12 bar boogie rock band and the King Earl Boogie Band (with former members of Mungo Jerry).

== Status Quo reunion ==
In 2012 Coghlan, along with bandmates Rick Parfitt, Francis Rossi and Alan Lancaster, reunited for a special one-off jam session at Shepperton Studios for the band's first cinematic documentary Hello Quo!, directed by Alan G. Parker. It was the first time the four had all been in the same room and played together since Coghlan left in 1981.

In October 2012, the same month as Hello Quo! was released, it was announced that the classic line-up of Status Quo were having a one-off reunion tour across the UK planned for March 2013: their first tour together in 32 years. Tickets went on sale in November and sold out in under 20 minutes. The tour consisted of nine shows, the first being at Manchester Apollo and including two back-to-back dates at Hammersmith Apollo, with the final gig at Wembley Arena on 17 March 2013. Footage was released as a Blu-ray / DVD / CD on 30 September 2013. There was another reunion tour in 2014, accompanied by further CD/DVD/Blu-ray releases.

== Personal life ==
Coghlan has one daughter, Charlotte, from his marriage to first wife Carol. As a consequence of his life as a band member, Coghlan moved around for several years before making his home in Ballasalla, Isle of Man, for ten years. Coghlan now lives in Shilton, Oxfordshire with Gillie, his second wife of more than 30 years. Gillie worked in the music business, including for the agents at MAM, NEMS and Bron, who represented bands such as Hall & Oates, Black Sabbath, Nils Lofgren, Hot Chocolate, Barclay James Harvest and Ace. Gillie has competed in, and won, many TV quiz shows over the years, including The Chase, The Weakest Link, Lose a Million and Sale of The Century International representing England. John and Gillie featured in an episode of The Life Laundry which looked at much of his music memorabilia.

Coghlan has a love for four-wheel drive and military vehicles (especially vintage), and the band participated in an off-roading video whilst he was with them. He is also the patron of the 'Westie ReHoming' charity, which aims to find homes for West Highland White Terriers.
