= John Edwards (musician) =

British bass guitarist (born 1953)

John "Rhino" Edwards
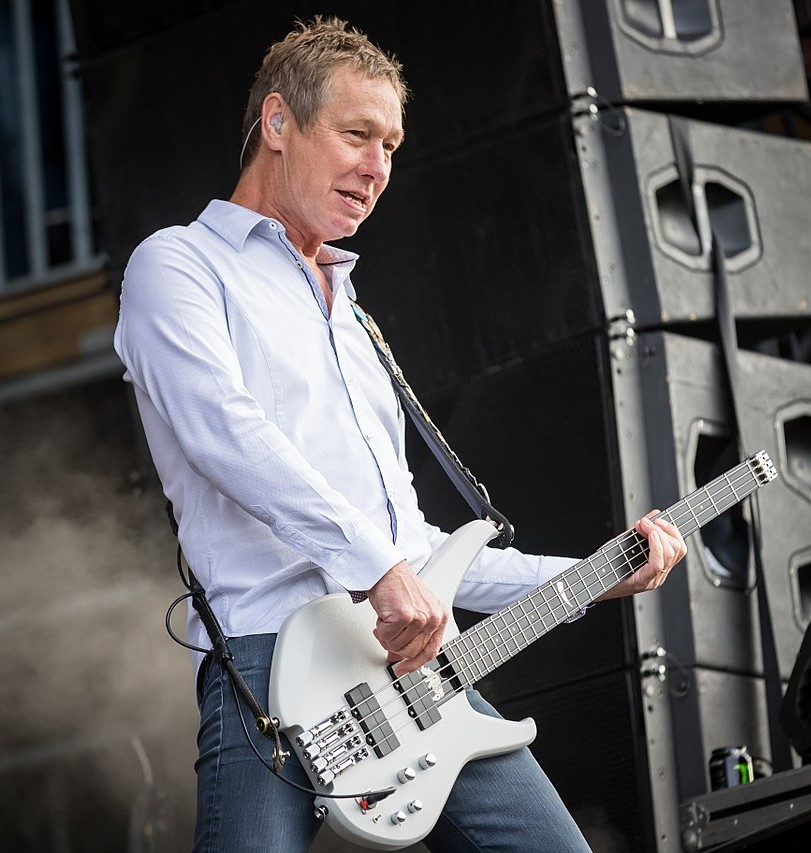
- Edwards performing with Status Quo at Wacken Open Air festival, 2017

Background information
- Also known as: Rhino
- Born: 9 May 1953 (age 73); Chiswick, London, England
- Genres: Hard rock
- Instruments: Bass guitar, violin, guitar
- Years active: 1973–present
- Website: www.rhinosrevenge.com

John Victor "Rhino" Edwards (born 9 May 1953) is an English bass guitarist, playing in the rock group Status Quo.

== Career ==
Around 1973–74, Edwards was playing simultaneously in two pub bands in The White Bear in Hounslow; The Sunday Band (playing on that day of the week) played covers of rock standards, and Rococo, which had a regular Friday slot. Rococo released a single "Ultrastar"/"Wildfire" on Decca Deram in 1973.

Later on he joined Judie Tzuke's backing band, where he was given the nickname "Rhino" for being clumsy.

Edwards has played with Peter Green, ex-Fleetwood Mac, Climax Blues Band, Judie Tzuke, Kim Wilde and Dexys Midnight Runners.

Edwards was working with drummer Jeff Rich, when Status Quo guitarist Rick Parfitt approached them both to work on his solo album Recorded Delivery. When Status Quo reformed with a new lineup in 1986, Edwards and Rich were called in to replace founding member Alan Lancaster and drummer Pete Kircher.

He released the album Rhino's Revenge in 2000, on which some tracks featured other members of Status Quo. Recently he has played a small number of gigs in the UK and Europe with Woodedz, playing alongside his children.

As a fan of Brentford F.C., Edwards wrote a song in early 2006 about striker Lloyd Owusu's return to the club for the start of that football season.

== Equipment ==
Edwards owns several different basses from different manufacturers, including Rickenbacker and Wal. However while playing live with Status Quo he uses basses from Status Graphite, mainly two headless four stringed and a five stringed model. For amplification he uses a Markbass F1 amp with 2 4x10 horn loaded cabinets, with a repeater amp on the other side of the stage through a regular Marshall 4 x 12 cabinet. During the song "Gerdundula", Edwards plays a Tanglewood guitar through a Marshall JCM800 head and a 4x12 cabinet.

== Personal life and family ==
Edwards's son Freddie is a guitarist and in October 2014 he accompanied Status Quo on stage at The Roundhouse in London, in a concert broadcast live by BBC Radio 2, to launch the band's album Aquostic – Stripped Bare. He was also a member of the subsequent Aquostic touring version of the band.
