= Alan Lancaster =

British bassist and singer (1949–2021)

- Performing with Status Quo, c.1984

Background information
- Born: Alan Charles Lancaster; 7 February 1949; Peckham, London, England
- Died: 26 September 2021 (aged 72) Sydney, New South Wales, Australia
- Genres: Hard rock, rock and roll, blues rock, boogie rock, psychedelic rock
- Occupation: Musician
- Instruments: Bass, vocals
- Years active: 1962–2014
- Formerly of: Status Quo, The Party Boys, The Bombers

Alan Charles Lancaster (7 February 1949 – 26 September 2021) was an English musician, best known as a founding member and bassist of the rock band Status Quo, playing with the band from 1967 to 1985, with brief reunions in 2013 and 2014. As well as contributing to songwriting, he was also one of the lead vocalists on albums and live concerts, taking the lead on tracks such as "Backwater", "Is There a Better Way", "Bye Bye Johnny", "High Flyer" and "Roadhouse Blues".

Alan Lancaster formed the group in 1962 with his then-schoolmate Francis Rossi. His final performance as a full-time member of Status Quo was at Wembley Stadium on 13 July 1985 for the opening of Live Aid. In March 2013, he collaborated with his old bandmates for a series of "Frantic Four" concerts in the UK.

== Career ==
=== Status Quo (1962–1985) ===
While attending Sedgehill Comprehensive School in 1962, Lancaster befriended future Status Quo singer and guitarist Francis Rossi while playing in the school orchestra. With classmates Alan Key (drums) and Jess Jaworski (keyboards), the pair formed a band called The Paladins, who played their first gig at the Samuel Jones Sports Club in Dulwich.

An Urban legend about Status Quo was that they formed as "The Scorpions", but this was disproven by Lancaster.

The Scorpions have always been cited as the band's first name and this is ingrained into Quo history. However, this has now been exposed as an urban myth. [...] We called ourselves 'The Paladins' for a short while - before changing to The 'Spectres'.

— Alan Lancaster

At another gig at the sports club, manager Pat Barlow approached the band, and Lancaster's mother agreed to let him manage the band. Key was replaced by Air Cadets drummer and future Quo member John Coghlan, and the band was renamed The Spectres. "We were novices," noted Lancaster. "None of us could play a note but we were good together."

The Spectres wrote their own material and played live shows, and in 1965 played at Butlin's Minehead. There they met future Quo guitarist Rick Parfitt, who was playing as part of a cabaret act called "The Highlights". The band became close friends with Parfitt, and they agreed to continue working together. In 1966, The Spectres signed a five-year deal with Piccadilly Records, releasing three singles that failed to chart. The group again changed their name, this time initially to "Traffic" but quickly renamed to "Traffic Jam" to avoid issues with Steve Winwood's band, after embracing psychedelia.

In August 1967, they officially became "The Status Quo". Their break through as The Status Quo came in 1968 with the song "Pictures of Matchstick Men". The song went to number 7 in the UK, and number 12 in the US.

Quo's hit singles from the band in the 1970s/1980s, with peak UK chart position and year, include: "Paper Plane" (No. 8 in 1972), "Caroline" (No. 5 in 1973), "Break The Rules" (No. 8 in 1974), "Down Down" (No. 1 in 1975), "Roll Over Lay Down" (No. 10 in 1975), "Rain" (No. 7 in 1976), "Mystery Song" (No. 11 in 1976), "Wild Side of Life" (No. 9 in 1976), "Rockin' All Over the World" (No. 3 in 1977), "Again and Again" (No. 13 in 1978), "Whatever You Want" (No. 4 in 1979), "Living on an Island" (No. 16 in 1979), "What You're Proposing" (No. 2 in 1980), the double A-side "Lies" and "Don't Drive My Car" (No. 11 in 1980), "Somethin' 'Bout You Baby I Like" (No. 9 in 1981) and "Rock 'n' Roll" (No. 8 in 1981). "Down Down" topped the UK Singles Chart in January 1975, becoming their first UK No. 1 single.

In 1984 the band undertook "The End of the Road Tour", a farewell tour, as tensions within the band had reached a stage where they were finding it increasingly difficult to work together. They reformed for Live Aid, but Lancaster's relationship with Francis Rossi became increasingly strained when Rossi and Rick Parfitt covertly began recording a new album under the name of "Status Quo". Unbeknownst to Lancaster – by now living in Australia – and the group's then recording company, Lancaster was substituted by session musician John 'Rhino' Edwards, who had been recording on a solo project of Parfitt's – Recorded Delivery – which was eventually scrapped. Edwards remains Quo's bassist to this day.

=== Later career "The Bombers" (1985–2021) ===
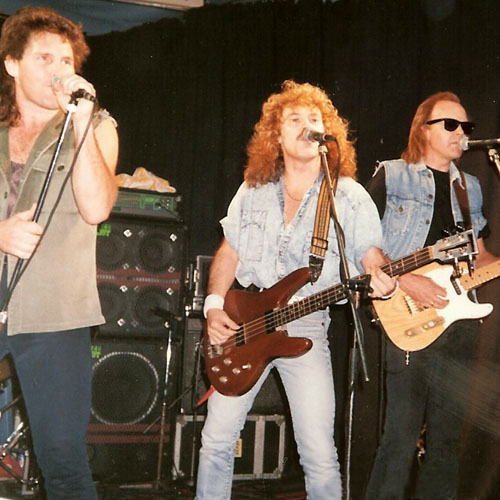
Lancaster with Tyrone Coates and John Brewster of The Bombers

In 1987 Lancaster joined a new line-up of the Australian band The Party Boys and co-produced their self-titled album, achieving platinum sales. The single "He's Gonna Step on You Again" was number one in the Australian charts for two weeks. In 1988, he formed The Bombers, which signed to A&M Records. It was paid the largest advance ever paid to an Australian-based band, but after the band had completed one album, A&M was sold to Phonogram.

The Bombers' original drummer was Lancaster's ex-Status Quo bandmate John Coghlan. The Bombers supported Cheap Trick (1988), Alice Cooper (1990) and Skid Row (1990) on their tours of Australia. When the Bombers disbanded, Lancaster continued with his then-partner John Brewster ("The Angels") with "The Lancaster Brewster Band", in which Angry Anderson performed as a guest artist for some time. Lancaster then formed his own band: Alan Lancaster's Bombers which released an E.P. and toured Scandinavia before disbanding in 1995. As well as writing the theme song for the film Indecent Obsession, he also produced an album for classical pianist Roger Woodward, which achieved platinum sales in Australia.

=== Amends with Quo and "Frantic Four" tour (2013–2014) ===
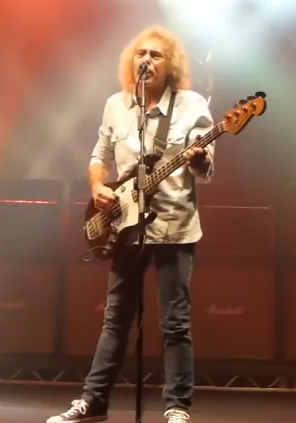
Performing with Status Quo in 2013, on the "Frantic Four" reunion tour

In March 2010 Lancaster and Rossi met in Sydney leading to speculation of the original line-up reuniting. This was later denied by current bassist, Rhino, who explained in an interview that Lancaster was in poor health and unable to participate in any such reunion. However his health improved and it was announced that the classic "Frantic Four" line-up of Francis Rossi, Rick Parfitt, Alan Lancaster and John Coghlan would perform a series of concerts together in March 2013.

He appeared in the 2012 documentary on Status Quo, titled Hello Quo.

In 2014, Lancaster again participated in the original four-piece Quo line-up and went on another successful tour. Although he appeared to be somewhat physically fragile on stage, his vocals were well received by the crowds. Lancaster's final appearance with Status Quo on the 2014 tour took place on 12 April at The O2 in Dublin.

In November 2019, Lancaster was interviewed extensively about his time in his post Quo outfits The Party Boys and The Bombers on the Australian Rock Show podcast.

== Personal life ==
Born in Peckham, London in 1949, Lancaster has stated that he had a "great" upbringing. He attended Sedgehill Comprehensive School, where he met Rossi in the school orchestra. Rossi and Lancaster became close friends and, along with other schoolmates formed a band – an early Quo forerunner.

On 26 September 2021, Lancaster died in Sydney, Australia, at the age of 72, due to complications from multiple sclerosis.
