= Andy Bown =

English musician (born 1946)

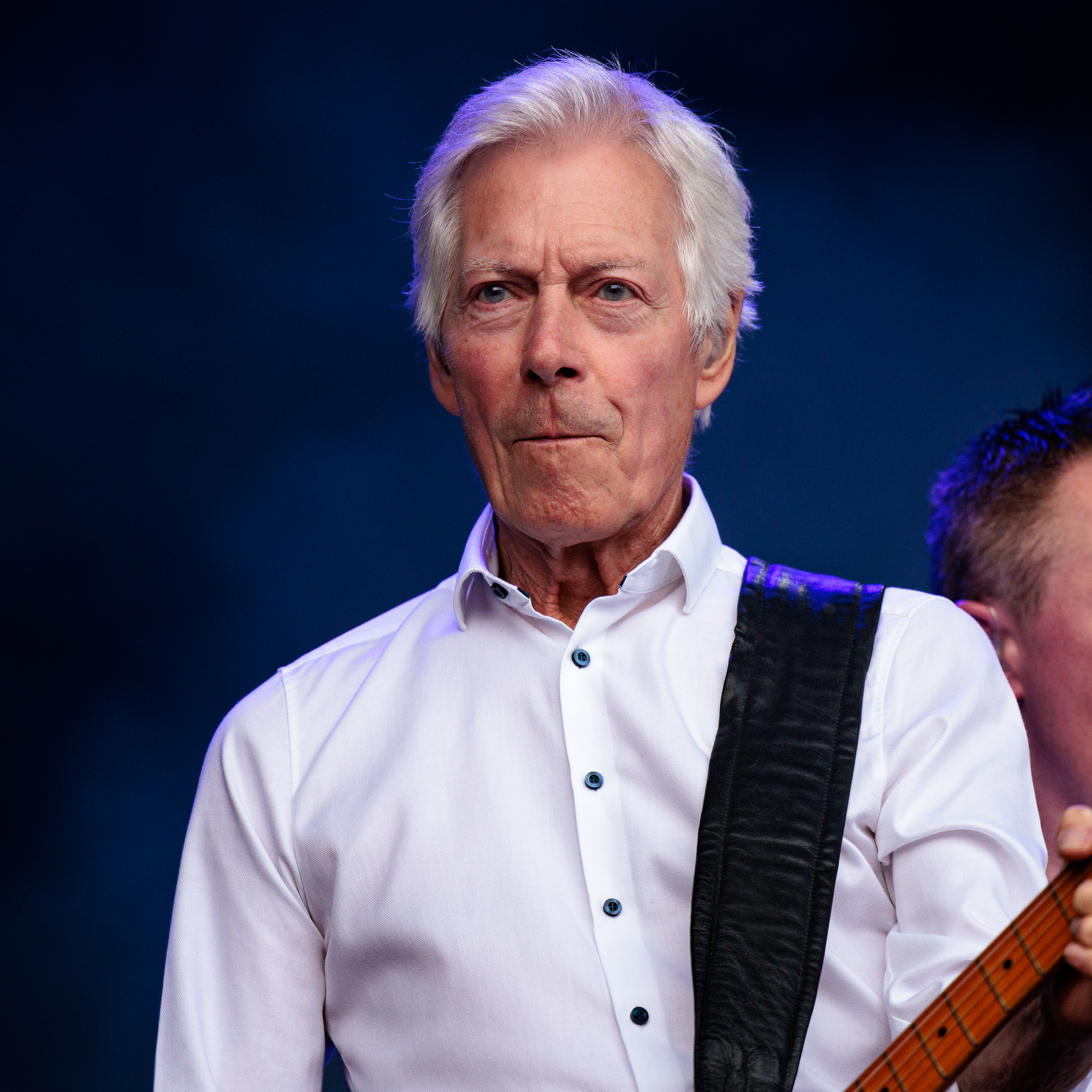
- Bown performing with Status Quo at Arvika Hamnfest in Arvika, 2024

Background information
- Born: Andrew Steven Bown; 27 March 1946 (age 80); Beckenham, Kent, England
- Genres: Hard rock; rock and roll
- Instruments: Keyboards; bass guitar; vocals; guitar; harmonica
- Years active: 1966–present
- Member of: Status Quo
- Formerly of: The Herd; Judas Jump
- Website: andybown.com

Andrew Steven Bown (born 27 March 1946) is an English musician, who has specialised in keyboards and bass guitar. He is a member of the rock band Status Quo, initially working with them as a session/touring musician during the 1970s and becoming an official member in the early 1980s. Prior to joining Status Quo, he was a member of The Herd during the 1960s.

== Career ==
Bown's first major band was The Herd, along with Peter Frampton. After The Herd dissolved he spent two years with Judas Jump who were the opening act of the Isle of Wight Festival 1970. He played for Frampton in the 1970s, initially on keyboards, then switched to bass briefly when Rick Wills departed the Peter Frampton band in early 1975. Bown himself left the Frampton entourage less than a year later, just as Frampton was on the verge of achieving worldwide success. He went back to England where he first dabbled with a solo career (recording two solo albums for Bill Gaff's GM label, US Mercury), as well as sessions with Jerry Lee Lewis on the London Session Album. In 1973, Bown played keyboards on Status Quo's Hello! album. He next worked with the band on 1976's Blue For You and its subsequent tour. Bown continued working with Quo as a session and touring musician, and was finally promoted to full band membership at the end of 1981. He has remained a member of the band ever since.

Bown released a number of singles in the 1970s, including "New York Satyricon Zany" and "Another Shipwreck", none of which charted. His most well-known song however was the theme tune to the children's series Ace of Wands, "Tarot", released in 1970. He also released five albums, the first of which, Gone to My Head, was released in 1972.

His solo album, Unfinished Business, was released on 5 September 2011. The album was produced by Mike Paxman and recorded by Chris West, and it features contributions from Henry Spinetti on drums, Mick Rogers on guitars, Trevor Bolder and Brad Lang on basses as well as vocalists Juliet Roberts and Sylvia Mason-James. It was recorded at State of the Ark Studios in Richmond, Surrey in 2010.

He was the bass player in the "Surrogate Band" during Pink Floyd's The Wall tour in 1980 and 1981 and can be heard on the live album Is There Anybody Out There? The Wall Live 1980–81. He also did some keyboards for Pink Floyd's The Final Cut album. and on Jack the Lad's last album Jackpot in 1976. In addition he played Hammond organ and 12-string guitar during the recording of Roger Waters' solo album The Pros and Cons of Hitch Hiking in 1984, but did not take part in Waters' subsequent tours.

He still plays keyboards, guitar and harmonica with Status Quo, and is an integral part of the band, having co-written many well known Quo songs on various studio albums, most prominently collaborating with Rick Parfitt on the group's 1979 hit "Whatever You Want".

Andy Bown released a solo album titled "Out There: A Deep Space Love Story By Russell Hoban & Andy Bown", which was released on November 21, 2025. The Project: The album is a collaboration with late author Russell Hoban, described as a "mind-bending operatic deep-space love story" developed from demo tapes found after Hoban's death. The album was released on CD and 12" vinyl, featuring eight tracks including "Flick and Fade," "There's a Black Hole Called Regret," and "City Of Love" (featuring Judie Tzuke). It is available via his official website (andybown.com) and on streaming platforms as of November 21, 2025.

In a 2026 interview, Bown hinted that this release is part of a larger, ongoing project, and he is continuing to work on further installments emphasising perhaps that given Status Quo's dormancy as a band his immediate recording future will consist of solo projects.

== Discography ==
- Gone to My Head – 1972
- Sweet William – 1973
- Come Back Romance, All Is Forgiven – 1977
- Good Advice – 1978
- Unfinished Business – 2011
- Out There (A Deep-Space Love Story) – 2025

== Equipment ==
During live performances Bown uses a Roland RD-700 piano, a Hammond C3 Organ and a Roland D-70 synthesizer, which are connected to a Roland U-220, an E-mu Vintage Keys module, an Akai Sampler and a Leslie speaker.

Bown uses a vintage Fender Telecaster, a Gibson Les Paul, a Washburn semi-acoustic as well as a Takamine acoustic. He also uses custom Telecaster types and a Stratocaster-type made by J Davey Guitars, and sometimes uses Rick Parfitt's custom-made Fender Telecaster Thinline
