= Bob Young (musician) =

- Born: Robert Keith Young; 16 May 1945 (age 81); Basingstoke, Hampshire, England
- Origin: Basingstoke, England
- Genres: Rock
- Occupations: Musician, author
- Instrument: Harmonica
- Years active: 1965–present
- Formerly of: Status Quo, The Young & Moody Band
- Website: BobYoungTicker

Robert Keith Young (born 16 May 1945) is an English musician and author, who became famous for being the unofficial fifth member of the rock band Status Quo.

== Collaborations with Status Quo ==
From the mid-1960s onwards, Young has been working in the music business, starting as a crew member for Amen Corner, The Nice and also for The Herd. Based on this experience he was hired by the management of Status Quo, after they had their first hit with "Pictures of Matchstick Men" in 1968.

Since he spent a lot of time with the band while being on tour, he got involved with their music as well. As early as 1969 he started writing songs for the band. On Status Quo's single "The Price of Love" he could be heard on harmonica for the first time, making him an unofficial member of the group.

In the following years he wrote a number of songs for Status Quo, usually together with lead guitarist and singer Francis Rossi. Among these songs were hits such as "Caroline", "Paper Plane" and "Down Down".

In 1978 the book Alias The Compass was released which contained poems and song lyrics by Bob Young, written while he was working with Status Quo. In the second half of the 1970s his collaboration with Francis Rossi became less intense although Young remained Quo's tour manager until 1980. The biography Again and Again (co-written by Bob Young and John Shearlaw), came out in 1984. In this book Young reports on his years with Status Quo.

Apart from writing with Rossi, Bob Young also co-wrote songs with other bandmembers, most notably Rick Parfitt and Alan Lancaster.

== Young & Moody ==
Together with guitarist Micky Moody, whom he got to know when Moody supported Status Quo with his band SNAFU, Young founded "Young & Moody" (also known as The Young & Moody Band) in 1976. They signed a contract with Magnet Records but the band's releases failed to create major success.

Together with Micky Moody, Young also released the book The Language of Rock'n'Roll. Moody joined David Coverdale's band Whitesnake in 1978, but continued to record with Young.

Although Young concentrated on book releases during this period he also recorded from time to time. Alongside other Status Quo members and Micky Moody he can be heard on the album Line-Up by the former Rainbow-lead vocalist Graham Bonnett, to which he and Moody contributed three of their own compositions.

Young also joined the "Diesel Band" of former Status Quo drummer John Coghlan, which played a number of gigs but never released any records.

== Solo and back to Status Quo ==
In 1986, Young's first solo album In Quo Country was released. It contained a number of songs which Young had (co-)written for Status Quo, but now recorded in country music style. Young was asked to do the biggest gig of country music in England at Wembley. He formed a band with Mickey Moody and called it Bob Young and the Double M band. Members were Graham Preskett (violin), BJ Cole (pedal steel), Dave Kerr-Clemenson (bass) and Billy Bremner (guitar). Since the 1990s Young worked as a music manager for several artists, including Vanessa Mae and INXS singer Ciaran Gribbin aka. Joe Echo. Furthermore, he did some work for British broadcaster BBC and wrote another book (together with Ray Minhinnett) about the Fender Stratocaster.

Finally, in the year 2000, he started working with Rossi again. The official 40th Anniversary Book by Status Quo has been co-written by him. A limited edition of the book contains rare and previously unreleased demo recordings from Young's private archive.

In 2002, he also was a guest on the Lemon Jelly's album, Lost Horizons.

On Status Quo's 2013 "Frantic Four" tour, Young again joined the band on stage to play harmonica during performances of "Railroad" and "Roadhouse Blues".

== Bibliography ==
- John Shearlaw, Status Quo - The Authorised Biography, Sidgwick & Jackson (1st. ed. 1979, 2nd ed. '20th Anniversary Edition' 1982, 3rd. ed. '25th Anniversary Edition' 1986, ISBN 0-283-99401-0)
- John Shearlaw, Bob Young: Again & Again. Sidgwick & Jackson, October 1984, Paperback, ISBN 0-283-99101-1
- Bob Young: Quotographs - Celebrating 30 Years of Status Quo, IMP International Music Publications Limited, 1985, ISBN 1-85909-291-8
- Francis Rossi, Rick Parfitt, Bob Young "Status Quo": The Official 40th Anniversary Edition . Cassell Illustrated, October 2006, hard cover, ISBN 978-1-84403-562-5.
