= Status Quo discography =

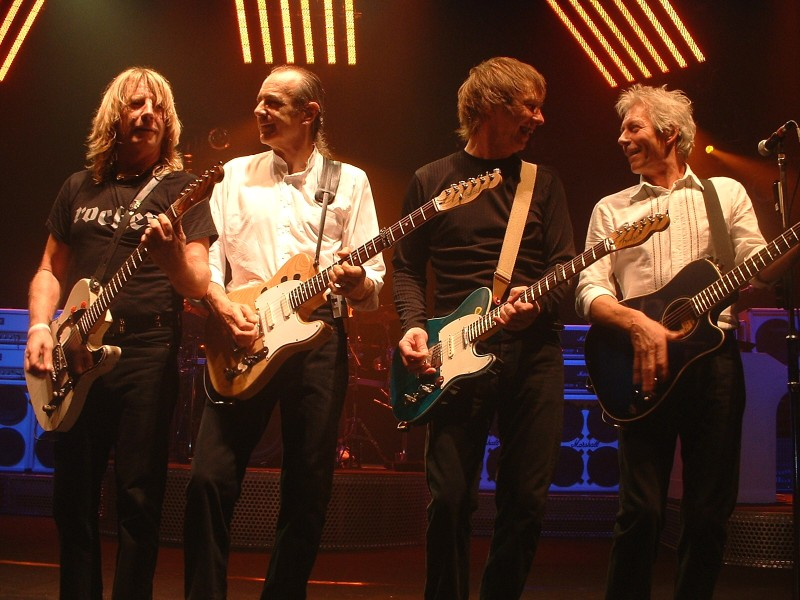
- Status Quo at the Bristol Beacon, Bristol on 15 November 2005
- Studio albums: 33
- Live albums: 14
- Compilation albums: 37
- Singles: 98
- Video albums: 27
- Music videos: 69
- Box sets: 20

This is the discography of the British rock band Status Quo. They have released around 100 singles and have spent over 400 weeks in the UK singles chart. They have spent over 500 weeks in the UK Albums Chart and are one of the most successful bands of all time in the UK. Their most recent album, Backbone, was released in 2019.

For a full list of the band's songs, see List of songs by Status Quo.

== Albums ==
=== Studio albums ===
| Title | Album details | Peak chart positions | | | | | | | | | | Certifications |
| Title | Album details | UK | AUS | AUT | FIN | GER | NL | NOR | SPA | SWE | SWI | Certifications |
|---|---|---|---|---|---|---|---|---|---|---|---|---|
| Picturesque Matchstickable Messages from the Status Quo | Released: 27 September 1968; Label: Pye; Formats: LP, MC, 4-track, reel-to-reel | — | — | — | — | — | — | — | — | — | — | |
| Spare Parts | Released: 26 September 1969; Label: Pye; Formats: LP | — | — | — | — | — | — | — | — | — | — | |
| Ma Kelly's Greasy Spoon | Released: 28 August 1970; Label: Pye; Formats: LP, MC, 8-track | — | — | — | — | — | — | — | — | — | — | |
| Dog of Two Head | Released: 5 November 1971; Label: Pye; Formats: LP, MC, 8-track | — | — | — | — | — | — | — | — | — | — | |
| Piledriver | Released: 15 December 1972; Label: Vertigo; Formats: LP, MC, 8-track | 5 | 15 | — | 13 | 31 | — | 23 | — | — | — | AUS: Platinum; FRA: Gold; SWE: Gold; UK: Gold |
| Hello! | Released: 28 September 1973; Label: Vertigo; Formats: LP, MC, 8-track | 1 | 19 | — | 6 | 37 | — | 6 | — | 10 | — | AUS: Platinum; FRA: Gold; NL: Gold; SWE: Gold; IFPI SWI: Platinum; UK: Gold |
| Quo | Released: 3 May 1974; Label: Vertigo; Formats: LP, MC, 8-track | 2 | 23 | 10 | 10 | 21 | — | 6 | — | 8 | — | AUS: Gold; FRA: Gold; GLF: Gold; SWI: Gold; UK: Gold |
| On the Level | Released: 21 February 1975; Label: Vertigo; Formats: LP, MC, 8-track | 1 | 2 | — | 3 | 11 | 1 | 4 | 15 | 1 | — | AUS: 3× Platinum; FRA: Gold; NL: Gold; SWE: Gold; SWI: Gold; UK: Gold |
| Blue for You | Released: 12 March 1976; Label: Vertigo; Formats: LP, MC, 8-track | 1 | 3 | — | 17 | 15 | 2 | — | — | 3 | — | AUS: 3× Platinum; FRA: Gold; NL: Gold; NZ: Platinum; SPA: Platinum; UK: Gold |
| Rockin' All Over the World | Released: 11 November 1977; Label: Vertigo; Formats: LP, MC, 8-track | 5 | 14 | 24 | 18 | 7 | 9 | 16 (Note: Peak position in 2004.) | — | 19 | — | AUS: 2× Platinum; FRA: Gold; GER: Gold; SPA: Platinum; SWI: Gold; UK: Gold |
| If You Can't Stand the Heat... | Released: 27 October 1978; Label: Vertigo; Formats: LP, MC, 8-track | 3 | 21 | — | — | 11 | 8 | 18 | — | 15 | — | AUS: Gold; FRA: Gold; SWI: Gold; UK: Gold |
| Whatever You Want | Released: 12 October 1979; Label: Vertigo; Formats: LP, MC | 3 | 22 | 16 | — | 9 | 7 | 21 | 7 | 18 | — | AUS: Gold; FRA: Gold; NL: Gold; UK: Gold |
| Just Supposin' | Released: 17 October 1980; Label: Vertigo; Formats: LP, MC | 4 | 31 | 6 | — | 14 | 6 | 22 | 7 | 26 | — | FRA: Gold; SPA: Gold; SWI: Gold; UK: Gold |
| Never Too Late | Released: 13 March 1981; Label: Vertigo; Formats: LP, MC | 2 | 33 | 9 | — | 12 | 15 | 12 | 12 | 14 | — | FRA: Gold; SPA: Platinum; UK: Gold |
| 1+9+8+2 | Released: 16 April 1982; Label: Vertigo; Formats: LP, MC | 1 | 60 | 16 | — | 29 | 15 | 7 | — | 21 | — | UK: Gold |
| Back to Back | Released: 25 November 1983; Label: Vertigo; Formats: LP, MC | 9 | 97 | — | — | 60 | 26 | — | — | 38 | 20 | UK: Gold |
| In the Army Now | Released: 29 August 1986; Label: Vertigo; Formats: CD, LP, MC | 7 | 87 | 12 | 15 | 14 | 50 | 6 | 13 | 12 | 1 | NOR: Silver; SPA: Gold; UK: Gold |
| Ain't Complaining | Released: 6 June 1988; Label: Vertigo; Formats: CD, LP, MC | 12 | — | 11 | 12 | 33 | — | 13 | — | 19 | 5 | UK: Gold |
| Perfect Remedy | Released: 13 November 1989; Label: Vertigo; Formats: CD, LP, MC | 49 | — | — | — | — | — | — | — | 40 | 26 | UK: Silver |
| Rock 'til You Drop | Released: 23 September 1991; Label: Vertigo; Formats: CD, LP, MC | 10 | — | — | — | — | — | — | — | 22 | 18 | |
| Thirsty Work | Released: 22 August 1994; Label: Polydor; Formats: CD, LP, MC | 13 | — | — | — | 87 | 87 | — | — | 6 | 10 | |
| Don't Stop | Released: 5 February 1996; Label: PolyGram TV; Formats: CD, MC | 2 | — | — | — | 42 | 88 | — | — | 14 | 28 | UK: Gold |
| Under the Influence | Released: 31 March 1999; Label: Eagle; Formats: CD, MC | 26 | — | — | — | 56 | 81 | — | — | — | 28 | |
| Famous in the Last Century | Released: 17 April 2000; Label: Universal Music TV; Formats: CD, MC | 19 | — | — | — | 46 | — | — | — | 20 | 56 | |
| Heavy Traffic | Released: 23 September 2002; Label: Universal Music TV; Formats: CD, MC | 15 | 48 | — | — | 35 | 75 | — | — | 30 | 21 | UK: Silver |
| Riffs | Released: 17 November 2003; Label: Universal Music TV; Formats: CD, MC | 44 | — | — | — | — | — | — | — | — | 70 (Note: Peak position upon reissue in 2022.) | UK: Silver |
| The Party Ain't Over Yet | Released: 19 September 2005; Label: Sanctuary; Formats: CD | 18 | — | — | — | 19 | 65 | — | — | 17 | 21 | |
| In Search of the Fourth Chord | Released: 17 September 2007; Label: Fourth Chord; Formats: CD, LP | 15 | — | — | — | 22 | 71 | — | — | 13 | 18 | |
| Quid Pro Quo | Released: 27 May 2011; Label: Fourth Chord; Formats: CD, 2×CD, 2×LP, digital download | 10 | — | 26 | — | 13 | 32 | — | — | 32 | 8 | UK: Silver |
| Bula Quo! | Released: 7 June 2013; Label: Fourth Chord; Formats: 2×CD, LP, digital download | 10 | — | 27 | — | 17 | 41 | — | — | 27 | 13 | UK: Silver |
| Aquostic – Stripped Bare | Released: 17 October 2014; Label: Rhino; Formats: CD, 2×LP, digital download | 5 | — | 33 | — | 15 | 26 | — | — | 43 | 4 | UK: Gold |
| Aquostic II – That's a Fact! | Released: 21 October 2016; Label: Fourth Chord; Formats: CD, 2×CD, 2×LP, digital download | 7 | — | 37 | — | 26 | 50 | — | — | — | 13 | |
| Backbone | Released: 6 September 2019; Label: earMUSIC; Formats: CD, 2×CD, LP, digital download | 6 | 98 | 23 | — | 6 | 28 | — | 43 | 31 | 2 | |
"—" denotes releases that did not chart or were not released in that territory.

=== Live albums ===
| Title | Album details | Peak chart positions | | | | | | | | | Certifications |
| Title | Album details | UK | AUS | AUT | FIN | GER | NL | NOR | SWE | SWI | Certifications |
|---|---|---|---|---|---|---|---|---|---|---|---|
| Live! | Released: 4 March 1977; Label: Vertigo; Formats: 2×LP, MC, 8-track | 3 | 6 | 20 | — | 3 | 7 | — | 9 | — | AUS: 2× Platinum; FRA: Gold; GER: Gold; NL: Gold; SWI: Gold; UK: Gold; UK: Gold |
| Tokyo Quo | Released: June 1977; Label: Vertigo; Formats: LP; Japan-only release | — | — | — | — | — | — | — | — | — | |
| Live at the N.E.C. | Released: 5 November 1982 (as part of From the Makers of... box set) / May 1984 (individual); Label: Vertigo; Formats: LP, MC | 83 (Note: Chart position for individual release; the From the Makers of... box set, where this album was originally released, reached No. 4.) | — | — | — | — | 43 | — | 45 | — | |
| Live Alive Quo | Released: 2 November 1992; Label: Polydor; Formats: CD, LP, MC | 37 | — | — | — | — | — | — | — | — | |
| Pictures – Live at Montreux 2009 | Released: 12 October 2009; Label: Eagle Vision/Montreux Sounds; Formats: CD | 98 (Note: Peak position upon reissue in 2013 as Pictures: The Essential Collection.) | — | — | — | — | — | — | — | — | |
| Live at the BBC | Released: 22 October 2010; Label: Mercury/Universal Music; Formats: 2×CD, 4×CD, 7×CD | 176 | — | — | — | — | — | — | — | — | |
| The Frantic Four Reunion – Live at the O2 Academy Glasgow | Released: 3 October 2013; Label: earMusic; Formats: 2×LP | — | — | — | — | — | — | — | — | — | |
| The Frantic Four Reunion – Live at the Hammersmith Apollo | Released: 3 October 2013; Label: earMUSIC; Formats: 2×CD, 2×LP, digital download | 37 | — | — | — | 22 | 75 | — | — | 79 | |
| The Frantic Four Reunion – Live at Wembley Arena | Released: 3 October 2013; Label: earMusic; Formats: 2×CD | — | — | — | — | — | — | — | — | — | |
| The Frantic Four's Final Fling – Live at the Dublin O2 Arena | Released: 29 August 2014; Label: earMUSIC; Formats: 2×CD, 2×LP, digital download | 34 | — | — | — | 36 | 68 | — | — | 58 | |
| Aquostic – Live at the Roundhouse | Released: 13 April 2015; Label: earMUSIC; Formats: 2×CD, 2×LP, digital download | — | — | 51 | — | — | 57 | — | — | 33 | |
| The Last Night of the Electrics | Released: 14 July 2017; Label: earMUSIC; Formats: 2×CD, 2×LP, digital download | 24 | — | — | — | 10 | 93 | — | — | 17 | |
| Down Down & Dignified at the Royal Albert Hall | Released: 17 August 2018; Label: earMUSIC; Formats: CD, 2×LP, digital download | — | — | — | — | 66 | — | — | — | 35 | |
| Down Down & Dirty at Wacken | Released: 17 August 2018; Label: earMUSIC; Formats: CD, 2×LP, digital download | — | — | — | — | 23 | — | — | — | 15 | |
"—" denotes releases that did not chart or were not released in that territory.

=== Compilation albums ===
| Title | Album details | Peak chart positions | | | | | | | | | | Certifications |
| Title | Album details | UK | AUS | AUT | FIN | GER | NL | NOR | SPA | SWE | SWI | Certifications |
|---|---|---|---|---|---|---|---|---|---|---|---|---|
| Status Quo-Tations | Released: November 1969; Label: Marble Arch; Formats: LP | — | — | — | — | — | — | — | — | — | — | |
| The Best of Status Quo | Released: May 1973; Label: Pye; Formats: LP, MC, 8-track | 32 | — | — | — | — | — | — | — | — | — | |
| Golden Hour of Status Quo | Released: June 1973; Label: Golden Hour; Formats: LP, MC, 8-track | — | — | — | — | — | — | — | — | — | — | UK: Silver |
| Down the Dustpipe | Released: October 1975; Label: Golden Hour; Formats: LP, MC, 8-track | 20 | — | — | — | — | — | — | — | — | — | UK: Silver |
| The Rest of Status Quo | Released: September 1976; Label: Pye; Formats: LP, MC, 8-track | — | — | — | — | — | — | — | — | — | — | |
| The File Series | Released: January 1977; Label: Pye; Formats: 2xLP, 2xMC | — | — | — | — | — | — | — | — | — | — | |
| Just for the Record | Released: June 1979; Label: Pye; Formats: LP, MC | — | — | — | — | — | — | — | — | — | — | |
| 12 Gold Bars | Released: 14 March 1980; Label: Vertigo; Formats: LP, MC | 3 | 14 | — | — | 19 | 26 | 22 | 22 | — | — | AUS: Gold; UK: Platinum |
| Fresh Quota | Released: 18 September 1981; Label: PRT; Formats: LP, MC; Mini-album | 74 | — | — | — | — | — | — | — | — | — | |
| 12 Gold Bars Vol. 2 | Released: 23 November 1984; Label: Vertigo; Formats: CD, LP, MC | 12 | 80 | — | — | — | — | — | — | — | — | UK: Gold |
| The Complete Hitalbum | Released: January 1985; Label: Arcade; Formats: LP, MC; Netherlands-only release | — | — | — | — | — | 4 | — | — | — | — | |
| Hit Album | Released: February 1987; Label: Polystar; Formats: CD, LP, MC; Continental Europe-only release | — | — | — | — | 17 | — | — | — | — | 8 | |
| Rocking All Over the Years | Released: 8 October 1990; Label: Vertigo; Formats: CD, 2×LP, 2×MC | 2 | 10 | 14 | — | 46 | 20 | — | 5 | 20 | 12 | AUS: 4× Platinum; SPA: Gold; SWE: Gold; SWI: Gold; UK: 2× Platinum |
| It's Only Rock & Roll | Released: 1994; Label: Spectrum Music; Formats: CD, MC | — | — | — | — | — | — | — | — | — | — | |
| Whatever You Want – The Very Best of Status Quo | Released: 13 October 1997; Label: PolyGram TV/Vertigo; Formats: 2×CD, 2×MC | 13 | 71 | — | — | 13 | — | — | — | — | 18 | UK: Gold |
| The Singles Collection 1966–1973 | Released: June 1998; Label: Castle Music; Formats: 2×CD | — | — | — | — | — | — | — | — | — | — | |
| The Complete Status Quo | Released: October 1998; Label: Reader's Digest; Formats: 4xCD, 4xMC; Only available by mail order | — | — | — | — | — | — | — | — | — | — | |
| The Essential Status Quo Vol. 1 | Released: March 1999; Label: Spectrum Music; Formats: CD, MC | — | — | — | — | — | — | — | — | — | — | |
| The Essential Status Quo Vol. 2 | Released: August 1999; Label: Spectrum Music; Formats: CD, MC | — | — | — | — | — | — | — | — | — | — | |
| The Essential Status Quo Vol. 3 | Released: February 2000; Label: Spectrum Music; Formats: CD, MC | — | — | — | — | — | — | — | — | — | — | |
| Greatest Hits and More | Released: April 2000; Label: Universal Music; Formats: 2×CD; Netherlands-only release | — | — | — | — | — | 16 | — | — | — | — | |
| Classic Status Quo | Released: November 2000; Label: Universal Music; Formats: CD | — | — | — | — | — | — | — | — | — | — | |
| The Technicolor Dreams of the Status Quo – The Complete '60s Recordings | Released: February 2001; Label: Castle Music; Formats: 2xCD | — | — | — | — | — | — | — | — | — | — | |
| Down the Dustpipe – The '70s Pye Collection | Released: July 2001; Label: Castle Music; Formats: CD | — | — | — | — | — | — | — | — | — | — | |
| Got You Covered | Released: August 2001; Label: Crimson; Formats: CD | — | — | — | — | — | — | — | — | — | — | |
| The Swedish Collection | Released: April 2002; Label: Universal Music; Formats: 2×CD; Sweden-only release | — | — | — | — | — | — | — | — | 5 | — | |
| XS All Areas – The Greatest Hits | Released: 20 September 2004; Label: Universal Music TV; Formats: 2×CD | 16 | — | — | — | 84 | — | — | — | — | — | UK: Platinum |
| Gold | Released: August 2005; Label: Universal Music; Formats: 2×CD | — | — | — | 45 (Note: Peak position in 2011.) | — | — | — | — | 31 | — | |
| Pictures – 40 Years of Hits | Released: 10 November 2008; Label: Universal Music; Formats: 2×CD, 4×CD | 8 | — | — | — | — | — | — | — | 2 | — | UK: Gold |
| Die grössten Erfolge | Released: 17 February 2012; Label: earMUSIC; Formats: CD; Continental Europe-only release | — | — | — | — | — | — | — | — | — | 95 | |
| Accept No Substitute! The Definitive Hits | Released: 20 November 2015; Label: Universal Music; Formats: 3×CD, 2×LP | 21 | — | — | — | — | — | — | — | — | — | |
| Whatever You Want – The Essential Status Quo | Released: 25 November 2016; Label: Spectrum Music; Formats: 3×CD | 90 | — | — | — | — | — | — | — | — | — | |
| Keep 'Em Coming! – The Collection | Released: 17 February 2017; Label: Music Club Deluxe; Formats: 2×CD | 70 | — | — | — | — | — | — | — | — | — | |
| Collected | Released: 6 October 2017; Label: Universal Music; Formats: 3×CD | — | — | 64 | — | 49 | — | — | — | — | — | |
| Essential | Released: 28 August 2020; Label: Universal Music; Formats: 3×CD | 28 | — | — | — | — | — | — | — | — | — | |
| Quo'ing In – The Best of the Noughties | Released: 16 September 2022; Label: earMUSIC; Formats: 2×CD, 3×CD, digital download | 80 | — | — | — | 35 | — | — | — | — | 15 | |
| Driving to Glory | Released: 29 November 2024; Label: Explore Rights Management; Formats: CD | — | — | — | — | — | — | — | — | — | — | |
"—" denotes releases that did not chart or were not released in that territory.

=== Box sets ===
| Title | Album details | Peak chart positions | | Certifications |
| Title | Album details | UK | NL | Certifications |
|---|---|---|---|---|
| From the Makers Of... | Released: 5 November 1982; Label: Phonogram; Formats: 3×LP, 2×MC | 4 | — | UK: Gold |
| Great Box | Released: 25 June 1991; Label: Vertigo; Formats: 4×CD; Japan-only release | — | — | |
| The 70s Singles Box | Released: July 2001; Label: Castle Music/Sanctuary; Formats: 6×CDS | — | — | |
| Rockers Rollin' – Quo in Time 1972–2000 | Released: 3 December 2001; Label: Universal Music; Formats: 4×CD | — | — | |
| The Essential Status Quo | Released: November 2001; Label: Spectrum Music; Formats: 3×CD | — | — | UK: Gold |
| The Singles Collection 1968–69 | Released: January 2002; Label: Castle Music/Sanctuary; Formats: 7×CDS | — | — | |
| Now and Then | Released: 13 June 2005; Label: Crimson; Formats: 3×CD | 49 | — | |
| Top 100 | Released: 23 August 2010; Label: Universal Music; Formats: 5×CD; Netherlands-only release | — | 23 | |
| 4 Original Albums | Released: January 2011; Label: Universal Music/Vertigo; Formats: 4×CD | — | — | |
| 5 Original Albums | Released: August 2011; Label: Mercury/Universal Music/Vertigo; Formats: 5×CD | — | — | |
| Classic Album Selection | Released: 22 March 2013; Label: Mercury; Formats: 5×CD | — | — | |
| The Vinyl Collection 1972–1980 | Released: 14 August 2015; Label: Universal Music; Formats: 11×LP | — | — | |
| 5 Classic Albums | Released: 6 November 2015; Label: Spectrum Music/Universal Music; Formats: 5×CD | — | — | |
| The Vinyl Collection 1981-1996 | Released: 10 February 2017; Label: Universal Music; Formats: 12×LP | — | — | |
| The Vinyl Singles Collection 1972–1979 | Released: 10 March 2017; Label: Universal Music/Vertigo; Formats: 13×7" | — | — | |
| The Vinyl Singles Collection 1980–1984 | Released: 2 June 2017; Label: Universal Music; Formats: 12×7" | — | — | |
| The Vinyl Singles Collection 1984–1989 | Released: 4 August 2017; Label: Universal Music; Formats: 12×7" | — | — | |
| The Vinyl Singles Collection 1990–1999 | Released: 30 November 2018; Label: Universal Music; Formats: 16×7" | — | — | |
| The Vinyl Singles Collection 2000–2010 | Released: 26 April 2019; Label: Universal Music; Formats: 10×7" | — | — | |
| The Early Years 1966–69 | Released: 15 March 2024; Label: BMG; Formats: 5×CD | — | — | |
"—" denotes releases that did not chart or were not released in that territory.

== Singles ==
=== 1960s–1970s ===
| Title | Year | Peak chart positions | | | | | | | | | | Certifications | Album |
| Title | Year | UK | AUS | AUT | BEL (FL) | GER | IRE | NL | SPA | SWI | US | Certifications | Album |
|---|---|---|---|---|---|---|---|---|---|---|---|---|---|
As the Spectres
| "I (Who Have Nothing)" | 1966 | — | — | — | — | — | — | — | — | — | — | | Non-album singles |
| "Hurdy Gurdy Man" | 1966 | — | — | — | — | — | — | — | — | — | — | | Non-album singles |
| "(We Ain't Got) Nothin' Yet" | 1967 | — | — | — | — | — | — | — | — | — | — | | Non-album singles |
As the Traffic Jam
| "Almost but Not Quite There" | 1967 | — | — | — | — | — | — | — | — | — | — | | Non-album single |
As the Status Quo
| "Pictures of Matchstick Men" | 1968 | 7 | 19 | 18 | — | 7 | — | 3 | — | 5 | 12 | | Picturesque Matchstickable Messages from the Status Quo |
| "Black Veils of Melancholy" | 1968 | 51 (Note: Chart position is from the official UK "Breakers List".) | 85 | — | — | 36 | — | — (Note: "Black Veils of Melancholy" did not enter the Dutch Single Top 20, but did peak at number 18 on the Dutch Top 40.) | — | — | — | | Picturesque Matchstickable Messages from the Status Quo |
| "Ice in the Sun" | 1968 | 8 | 48 | — | 19 | 17 | 17 | — (Note: "Ice in the Sun" did not enter the Dutch Single Top 20, but did peak at number 24 on the Dutch Top 40.) | — | — | 70 | | Picturesque Matchstickable Messages from the Status Quo |
| "Technicolor Dreams" | 1968 | — | — | — | — | — | — | — | — | — | — | | Picturesque Matchstickable Messages from the Status Quo |
| "Make Me Stay a Bit Longer" | 1969 | — | — | — | — | — | — | — | — | — | — | | Non-album single |
As Status Quo
| "Are You Growing Tired of My Love" | 1969 | 46 | — | — | — | — | — | — | — | — | — | | Spare Parts |
| "The Price of Love" | 1969 | — | — | — | — | — | — | — | — | — | — | | Non-album singles |
| "Down the Dustpipe" | 1970 | 12 | 28 | — | — | — | 11 | — | — | — | — | | Non-album singles |
| "In My Chair" | 1970 | 21 | — | — | — | 38 | — | — | — | — | — | | Non-album singles |
| "Tune to the Music" | 1971 | — | — | — | — | — | — | — | — | — | — | | Non-album singles |
| "Railroad" (Note: "Railroad" was only released as a single in Germany and Spain.) | 1972 | — | — | — | — | — | — | — | — | — | — | | Dog of Two Head |
| "Paper Plane" | 1972 | 8 | — | — | — | 42 | 11 | — | — | — | — | | Piledriver |
| "Gerdundula" | 1972 | 53 | — | — | — | — | — | — | 16 | — | — | | Dog of Two Head |
| "Mean Girl" | 1973 | 20 | — | — | — | 40 | — | 14 | — | — | — | | Dog of Two Head |
| "Don't Waste My Time" (Note: "Don't Waste My Time" was only released as a single in the US.) | 1973 | — | — | — | — | — | — | — | — | — | — | | Piledriver |
| "Caroline" | 1973 | 5 | 31 | — | — | 36 | 11 | — | — | — | — | UK: Gold | Hello! |
| "Break the Rules" | 1974 | 8 | — | — | — | 18 | — | — | — | — | — | | Quo |
| "Just Take Me" (Note: "Just Take Me" was only released as a single in Spain.) | 1974 | — | — | — | — | — | — | — | — | — | — | | Quo |
| "Down Down" | 1974 | 1 | 4 | 14 | 1 | 7 | 2 | 1 | — | 2 | — | UK: Silver | On the Level |
| "Roll Over Lay Down" (live) | 1975 | 9 | 2 | — | 5 | 15 | — | 2 | — | — | — | | Non-album single |
| "Rain" | 1976 | 7 | 40 | — | 10 | 27 | 14 | 5 | — | 8 | — | | Blue for You |
| "Mystery Song" | 1976 | 11 | — | — | 21 | 38 | — | 15 | — | — | — | | Blue for You |
| "Mad About the Boy" (Note: "Mad About the Boy" was only released as a single in New Zealand.) | 1976 | — | — | — | — | — | — | — | — | — | — | | Blue for You |
| "Wild Side of Life" | 1976 | 9 | 8 | — | 22 | 15 | 12 | 18 | — | — | — | | Non-album single |
| "Spinning Wheel Blues" (Note: "Spinning Wheel Blues" was only released as a single in France.) | 1977 | — | — | — | — | — | — | — | — | — | — | | Ma Kelly's Greasy Spoon |
| "Rockin' All Over the World" | 1977 | 3 | 12 | 22 | 18 | 7 | 1 | 11 | — | 3 | — | UK: Platinum | Rockin' All Over the World |
| "Rockers Rollin'" / "Hold You Back" (Note: The double A-side single "Rockers Rollin'" / "Hold You Back" was only released in Continental Europe and Australasia.) | 1977 | — | — | — | 15 | 30 | — | 6 | — | — | — | | Rockin' All Over the World |
| "Again and Again" | 1978 | 13 | — | — | 28 | 18 | 5 | 9 | — | 8 | — | | If You Can't Stand the Heat... |
| "Accident Prone" | 1978 | 36 | — | — | 15 | 19 | — | 10 | — | — | — | | If You Can't Stand the Heat... |
| "Like a Good Girl" (Note: "Like a Good Girl" was only released as a single in Spain.) | 1979 | — | — | — | — | — | — | — | — | — | — | | If You Can't Stand the Heat... |
| "Whatever You Want" | 1979 | 4 | 22 | 11 | 4 | 12 | 5 | 5 | 2 | — | — | UK: Silver | Whatever You Want |
| "Living on an Island" | 1979 | 16 | 62 | — | — | 38 | 12 | 25 | 28 | — | — | | Whatever You Want |
"—" denotes releases that did not chart or were not released in that territory.

=== 1980s–1990s ===
| Title | Year | Peak chart positions | | | | | | | | | Certifications | Album |
| Title | Year | UK | AUS | AUT | BEL (FL) | GER | IRE | NL | SPA | SWI | Certifications | Album |
|---|---|---|---|---|---|---|---|---|---|---|---|---|
| "What You're Proposing" | 1980 | 2 | 62 | 4 | 7 | 3 | 2 | 4 | 3 | 2 | | Just Supposin' |
| "Lies" / "Don't Drive My Car" | 1980 | 11 | — | 9 | 31 | 38 | 10 | 24 | — | — | UK: Silver | Just Supposin' |
| "Something 'Bout You Baby I Like" | 1981 | 9 | 89 | — | — | 49 | 7 | 15 | 8 | 10 | | Never Too Late |
| "Rock 'n' Roll" | 1981 | 8 | — | — | 33 (Note: Chart peak upon release there in 1985.) | — | 3 | 20 | 10 | — | UK: Silver | Just Supposin' |
| "Dear John" | 1982 | 10 | — | — | 18 | — | 10 | 24 | — | — | | 1+9+8+2 |
| "She Don't Fool Me" | 1982 | 36 | — | — | — | — | — | — | — | — | | 1+9+8+2 |
| "Young Pretender" (Note: "Young Pretender" was only released as a single in the Netherlands.) | 1982 | — | — | — | — | — | — | — | — | — | | 1+9+8+2 |
| "Jealousy" (Note: "Jealousy" was only released as a single in Continental Europe and Ireland.) | 1982 | — | — | — | — | — | — | — | — | — | | 1+9+8+2 |
| "Caroline" (live) | 1982 | 13 | — | — | — | — | 12 | — | — | — | | Live at the NEC |
| "I Love Rock and Roll" (Note: "I Love Rock and Roll" was only released as a single in Australia.) | 1982 | — | — | — | — | — | — | — | — | — | | 1+9+8+2 |
| "Ol' Rag Blues" | 1983 | 9 | — | — | 31 | 47 | 7 | 20 | — | 17 | | Back to Back |
| "A Mess of Blues" | 1983 | 15 | — | — | — | — | 12 | — | — | — | | Back to Back |
| "Marguerita Time" | 1983 | 3 | — | — | — | 52 | 7 | 35 | — | 23 | UK: Silver | Back to Back |
| "Going Down Town Tonight" | 1984 | 20 | — | — | — | — | 14 | — | — | — | | Back to Back |
| "The Wanderer" | 1984 | 7 | 54 | — | 9 | — | 3 | 6 | — | 10 | | 12 Gold Bars Vol.2 |
| "Rollin' Home" | 1986 | 9 | — | — | — | — | 1 | 43 | — | 10 | | In the Army Now |
| "Red Sky" | 1986 | 19 | — | — | — | — | 5 | — | — | 29 | | In the Army Now |
| "In the Army Now" | 1986 | 2 | — | 1 | 15 | 1 | 1 | 15 | 2 | 1 | FRA: Gold; UK: Silver | In the Army Now |
| "Dreamin'" | 1986 | 15 | — | — | — | 20 | 11 | — | — | 17 | | In the Army Now |
| "The Quo Cake Mix" (Note: "The Quo Cake Mix" was the 12" B-side to "Dreamin'". It was only released as an A-side in Spain.) | 1987 | — | — | — | — | — | — | — | 13 | — | | Non-album single |
| "Ain't Complaining" | 1988 | 19 | — | 5 | — | 39 | 8 | — | — | 21 | | Ain't Complaining |
| "Who Gets the Love?" | 1988 | 34 | — | — | — | — | 27 | — | — | — | | Ain't Complaining |
| "I Know You're Leaving" (Note: "I Know You're Leaving" was only released as a single in France.) | 1988 | — | — | — | — | — | — | — | — | — | | Ain't Complaining |
| "Running All Over the World" | 1988 | 17 | — | — | — | 48 | 9 | — | — | — | | Non-album single |
| "Burning Bridges (On and Off and On Again)" | 1988 | 5 | — | — | — | — | 8 | — | — | — | UK: Silver | Ain't Complaining |
| "Not at All" | 1989 | 50 | — | — | — | — | — | — | — | — | | Perfect Remedy |
| "Little Dreamer" | 1989 | 76 | — | — | — | — | — | — | — | — | | Perfect Remedy |
| "The Anniversary Waltz – Part One" | 1990 | 2 | 104 | 9 | 13 | 17 | 3 | 5 | — | 12 | UK: Gold | Rocking All Over The Years |
| "The Anniversary Waltz – Part Two" | 1990 | 16 | — | — | 33 | — | 14 | 66 | — | — | | Non-album single |
| "Can't Give You More" | 1991 | 37 | — | — | — | — | — | — | — | — | | Rock 'til You Drop |
| "Rock 'til You Drop" | 1992 | 38 | — | — | — | — | — | — | — | — | | Rock 'til You Drop |
| "Roadhouse Medley (Anniversary Waltz Part 25)" | 1992 | 21 | — | — | — | — | 27 | — | — | — | | Live Alive Quo |
| "Come On You Reds" (with The Manchester United Football Squad) | 1994 | 1 | — | — | — | — | 2 | — | — | — | UK: Silver | Non-album single |
| "I Didn't Mean It" | 1994 | 21 | — | — | — | — | 23 | — | — | — | | Thirsty Work |
| "Sherri, Don't Fail Me Now!" | 1994 | 38 | — | — | — | — | — | — | — | — | | Thirsty Work |
| "Restless" | 1994 | 39 | — | — | — | — | — | — | — | — | | Thirsty Work |
| "When You Walk in the Room" | 1995 | 34 | — | — | — | — | — | — | — | — | | Don't Stop |
| "Fun Fun Fun" (with the Beach Boys) | 1996 | 24 | — | — | — | 81 | — | — | — | — | | Don't Stop |
| "Don't Stop" | 1996 | 35 | — | — | — | — | — | — | — | — | | Don't Stop |
| "All Around My Hat" (with Maddy Prior) | 1996 | 47 | — | — | — | — | — | — | — | — | | Don't Stop |
| "The Way It Goes" | 1999 | 39 | — | — | — | — | — | 62 | — | — | | Under the Influence |
| "Little White Lies" | 1999 | 47 | — | — | — | — | — | 73 | — | — | | Under the Influence |
| "Twenty Wild Horses" | 1999 | 53 | — | — | — | — | — | 96 | — | — | | Under the Influence |
"—" denotes releases that did not chart or were not released in that territory.

=== 2000s–present ===
| Title | Year | Peak chart positions | | | | | | Album |
| Title | Year | UK | AUT | BEL (FL) | GER | NL | SWI | Album |
|---|---|---|---|---|---|---|---|---|
| "Mony Mony" | 2000 | 48 | — | — | — | — | — | Famous in the Last Century |
| "Old Time Rock and Roll" | 2000 | 78 | — | — | — | — | — | Famous in the Last Century |
| "Jam Side Down" | 2002 | 17 | — | — | — | — | — | Heavy Traffic |
| "All Stand Up (Never Say Never)" | 2002 | 51 | — | — | — | — | — | Heavy Traffic |
| "You'll Come 'Round" | 2004 | 14 | — | — | — | — | — | XS All Areas – The Greatest Hits |
| "Thinking of You" | 2004 | 21 | — | — | — | — | — | XS All Areas – The Greatest Hits |
| "The Party Ain't Over Yet" | 2005 | 11 | — | — | 90 | — | — | The Party Ain't Over Yet |
| "All That Counts Is Love" | 2005 | 29 | — | — | — | — | — | The Party Ain't Over Yet |
| "Beginning of the End" | 2007 | 48 | — | — | — | — | — | In Search of the Fourth Chord |
| "It's Christmas Time" | 2008 | 40 | — | — | — | — | — | Pictures – 40 Years of Hits |
| "Jump That Rock (Whatever You Want)" (as Scooter vs Status Quo) | 2008 | 57 | 19 | — | 11 | 91 | 79 | Jumping All Over the World – Whatever You Want |
| "In the Army Now (2010)" (with the Corps of Army Music Choir) | 2010 | 31 | — | — | — | — | — | Quid Pro Quo |
| "Rock 'n' Roll 'n' You" | 2011 | — | — | — | — | — | — | Quid Pro Quo |
| "Two Way Traffic" | 2011 | — | — | — | — | — | — | Quid Pro Quo |
| "Better Than That" | 2011 | — | — | — | — | — | — | Quid Pro Quo |
| "Movin' On" | 2012 | — | — | — | — | — | — | Quid Pro Quo |
| "The Winner" | 2012 | — | — | — | — | — | — | Quid Pro Quo |
| "Bula Bula Quo!" | 2013 | — | — | — | — | — | — | Bula Quo! |
| "Looking Out for Caroline" | 2013 | — | — | 129 | — | — | — | Bula Quo! |
| "Go Go Go" | 2013 | — | — | — | — | — | — | Bula Quo! |
| "And It's Better Now" | 2014 | — | — | — | — | — | — | Aquostic – Stripped Bare |
| "Pictures of Matchstick Men" | 2014 | — | — | — | — | — | — | Aquostic – Stripped Bare |
| "Paper Plane" | 2015 | — | — | — | — | — | — | Aquostic – Stripped Bare |
| "Break the Rules" | 2015 | — | — | — | — | — | — | Aquostic – Stripped Bare |
| "That's a Fact" | 2016 | — | — | — | — | — | — | Aquostic II – That's a Fact! |
| "Hold You Back" | 2016 | — | — | — | — | — | — | Aquostic II – That's a Fact! |
| "Backbone" | 2019 | — | — | — | — | — | — | Backbone |
| "Liberty Lane" | 2019 | — | — | — | — | — | — | Backbone |
| "Face the Music" | 2020 | — | — | — | — | — | — | Backbone |
| "Cut Me Some Slack" | 2022 | — | — | — | — | — | — | Quo'ing In – The Best of the Noughties |
"—" denotes releases that did not chart or were not released in that territory.

== Videos ==
=== Video albums ===
| Title | Album details | Certifications |
|---|---|---|
| Off the Road | Released: 1980; Label: VCL; Formats: VHS; Withdrawn soon after release | |
| Live in Concert at the N.E.C. Birmingham | Released: September 1983; Label: Spectrum/PolyGram Video; Formats: VHS, Beta | |
| End of the Road '84 | Released: November 1984; Label: Videoform; Formats: VHS, Beta, LD | |
| More from the Road '84 | Released: February 1985; Label: Videoform; Formats: VHS, Beta | |
| Preserved | Released: November 1985; Label: Heron Home Entertainment; Formats: VHS, Beta | |
| Rocking Through the Years | Released: December 1986; Label: Channel 5; Formats: VHS, Beta | |
| Rocking All Over the Years – All Their Greatest Hits Live | Released: October 1990; Label: PolyGram Music Video; Formats: VHS, LD | |
| Anniversary Waltz – A Celebration of 25 Rockin' Years | Released: February 1991; Label: Castle Music Pictures; Formats: VHS, LD | |
| Rock 'til You Drop – The Live Event | Released: October 1991; Label: PolyGram Video; Formats: VHS | |
| Knebworth '90 – Top Stars Live on Stage | Released: December 1991; Label: Castle Music Pictures; Formats: VHS | |
| Live Alive Quo | Released: December 1992; Label: PolyGram Video; Formats: VHS | |
| Don't Stop – 30th Anniversary Live Video | Released: February 1996; Label: PolyGram Video; Formats: VHS | |
| Famous in the Last Century | Released: October 2000; Label: Eagle Vision; Formats: VHS, DVD | |
| XS All Areas – The Greatest Hits | Released: September 2004; Label: Universal; Formats: DVD | BPI: Gold |
| Classic Status Quo | Released: February 2005; Label: Universal; Formats: DVD | |
| The Party Ain't Over Yet... 40 Years of Status Quo | Released: November 2005; Label: Warner Music Vision; Formats: 2xDVD | BPI: Gold |
| The One and Only Status Quo | Released: September 2006; Label: Universal Music TV; Formats: DVD | |
| Just Doin' It Live | Released: 6 November 2006; Label: Warner Music Vision; Formats: DVD | BPI: Gold; ARIA: Gold |
| Pictures – Live at Montreux 2009 | Released: 12 October 2009; Label: Eagle Vision/Montreux Sounds; Formats: DVD, Blu-ray | |
| Live at the BBC | Released: 22 October 2010; Label: Mercury/Universal; Formats: DVD | |
| Hello Quo! | Released: 29 October 2012; Label: Anchor Bay Entertainment; Formats: DVD, 2xDVD, Blu-ray, 2xBlu-ray | |
| The Frantic Four Reunion 2013 – Live at Wembley Arena | Released: 3 October 2013; Label: earMUSIC; Formats: DVD, Blu-ray | |
| The Frantic Four's Final Fling – Live at the Dublin O2 Arena | Released: 29 August 2014; Label: earMUSIC; Formats: DVD, Blu-ray | |
| Aquostic – Live at the Roundhouse | Released: 13 April 2015; Label: earMUSIC; Formats: DVD, Blu-ray | |
| Accept No Substitute! The Definitive Hits & More! | Released: 20 November 2015; Label: Universal Music TV; Formats: 2xDVD | |
| The Last Night of the Electrics | Released: 14 July 2017; Label: earMUSIC; Formats: DVD, Blu-ray | |
| Down Down & Dirty at Wacken | Released: 17 August 2018; Label: earMUSIC; Formats: DVD, Blu-ray | |

=== Music videos ===
| Year | Title | Media | Director | Album |
|---|---|---|---|---|
| 1970 | "Down the Dustpipe" | Colour Film | | Non-album singles |
| 1970 | "In My Chair" | Colour Film | | Non-album singles |
| 1971 | "Tune to the Music" | Colour Film | | Non-album singles |
| 1972 | "Paper Plane" | Colour Film | | Piledriver |
| 1975 | "Down Down" | Colour Film | | On the Level |
| 1975 | "Roll Over Lay Down" | Colour VT | | Non-album single |
| 1976 | "Rain" | Colour VT | | Blue for You |
| 1976 | "Mystery Song" | Colour VT | | Blue for You |
| 1976 | "Wild Side of Life" | Colour VT | | Non-album single |
| 1977 | "Rockin All Over the World" | Colour VT | | Rockin' All Over the World |
| 1977 | "Rockers Rollin" | Colour Film | | Rockin' All Over the World |
| 1978 | "Again and Again" | Colour Film | | If You Can't Stand the Heat... |
| 1978 | "Someone Show Me Home" | Colour Film | | If You Can't Stand the Heat... |
| 1978 | "Accident Prone" | Colour Film | | If You Can't Stand the Heat... |
| 1978 | "Let Me Fly" | Colour Film | | If You Can't Stand the Heat... |
| 1979 | "Whatever You Want" | Colour VT | | Whatever You Want |
| 1979 | "Who Asked You" | Colour VT | | Whatever You Want |
| 1979 | "Living on an Island" | Colour VT | | Whatever You Want |
| 1979 | "Runaway" | Colour VT | | Whatever You Want |
| 1980 | "What You're Proposing" | Colour VT | | Just Supposin' |
| 1980 | "Lies" | Colour VT | | Just Supposin' |
| 1980 | "Don't Drive My Car" | Colour VT | | Just Supposin' |
| 1981 | "Something' 'Bout You Baby I Like" | Colour VT | Godley & Creme | Never Too Late |
| 1981 | "Rock 'n' Roll" | Colour VT | | Just Supposin' |
| 1982 | "Dear John" | Colour VT | | 1+9+8+2 |
| 1983 | "Ol' Rag Blues" | Colour VT | | Back to Back |
| 1983 | "A Mess of Blues" | Colour Film | Nigel Dick | Back to Back |
| 1983 | "Marguerita Time" | Colour Film | Nigel Dick | Back to Back |
| 1984 | "Going Down Town Tonight" | Colour Film | | Back to Back |
| 1984 | "The Wanderer" | Colour Film | Sebastian Harris | 12 Gold Bars Vol.2 |
| 1986 | "Rollin' Home" | Colour Film | | In The Army Now |
| 1986 | "In The Army Now" | B&W/Colour Film | | In The Army Now |
| 1986 | "Dreamin" | Colour Film | | In The Army Now |
| 1988 | "Ain't Complaining" | Colour Film | Terry Bulley | Ain't Complaining |
| 1988 | "Who Gets the Love?" | Colour Film | Mike Brady | Ain't Complaining |
| 1988 | "Running All Over the World" | Colour Film | | Non-album single |
| 1988 | "Burning Bridges" | Colour Film | | Ain't Complaining |
| 1989 | "Not at All" | Colour Film | | Perfect Remedy |
| 1989 | "Little Dreamer" | Colour Film | | Perfect Remedy |
| 1990 | "The Anniversary Waltz - Part One" | Colour Film | | Rocking All Over The Years |
| 1990 | "The Anniversary Waltz - Part Two" | Colour Film | | Non-album single |
| 1991 | "Can't Give You More" | Colour VT | | Rock 'til You Drop |
| 1992 | "Rock 'til You Drop" | Colour VT | | Rock 'til You Drop |
| 1994 | "Come On You Reds" | Colour VT | | Non-album single |
| 1994 | "I Didn't Mean It" | Colour Film | | Thirsty Work |
| 1994 | "Sherri, Don't Fail Me Now!" | Colour Film | | Thirsty Work |
| 1994 | "Restless" | B&W/Colour Film | | Thirsty Work |
| 1995 | "When You Walk in the Room" | B&W/Colour Film | | Don't Stop |
| 1996 | "Fun, Fun, Fun" | B&W/Colour VT | | Don't Stop |
| 1996 | "All Around My Hat" | Colour VT | | Don't Stop |
| 1999 | "The Way It Goes" | Colour Film | | Under the Influence |
| 2002 | "Jam Side Down" | Colour Film | | Heavy Traffic |
| 2004 | "You'll Come 'Round" | Colour Film | | XS All Areas – The Greatest Hits |
| 2004 | "Thinking of You" | Colour Film | | XS All Areas – The Greatest Hits |
| 2005 | "The Party Ain't Over Yet" | Colour VT | | The Party Ain't Over Yet |
| 2005 | "All That Counts Is Love" | Colour VT | | The Party Ain't Over Yet |
| 2007 | "Beginning of the End" | Colour VT | John Keeling | In Search of the Fourth Chord |
| 2008 | "Jump That Rock (Whatever You Want)" | Colour Film | Marc Schölermann | Jumping All Over the World |
| 2008 | "It's Christmas Time" | Colour VT | | Pictures – 40 Years of Hits |
| 2010 | "In The Army Now (2010)" | Colour VT | | Quid Pro Quo |
| 2011 | "Rock 'n' Roll 'n' You" | Colour VT | | Quid Pro Quo |
| 2011 | "Two Way Traffic" | B&W VT | | Quid Pro Quo |
| 2011 | "Let's Rock" | B&W VT | | Quid Pro Quo |
| 2013 | "Bula Bula Quo" | Colour VT | | Bula Quo! |
| 2013 | "Looking Out for Caroline" | Colour VT | | Bula Quo! |
| 2013 | "Go, Go, Go" | B&W VT | | Bula Quo! |
| 2016 | "That's a Fact!" | Colour VT | | Aquostic II – That's a Fact! |
| 2019 | "Backbone" | Colour VT | | Backbone |
| 2019 | "Liberty Lane" | Colour Film | | Backbone |
