= From the Makers of... =

Box set by Status Quo
- Released: 5 November 1982
- Genre: Rock
- Label: Phonogram
- Producer: various

Status Quo chronology
1+9+8+2 (1982)	From the Makers of... (1982)	Back to Back (1983)

Professional ratings
Review scores
Source	Rating
AllMusic	2.5/5 stars

From the Makers of... is a box set by British rock band Status Quo, released in 1982. In the era before CDs, the triple record/double cassette collection was the most comprehensive resume of the band's career at the time, containing all their top 20 hit singles up to that point and several selected album tracks. The third disc was a new recording of a live concert at the National Exhibition Centre in Birmingham, England for the Prince's Trust charity: the disc was subsequently re-released as a stand-alone live album in 1984, titled Live at the N.E.C.

The album's name comes from the caption that was placed on the back cover of each of the band's albums from 1972's Piledriver to 1983's Back to Back: "From the makers of..." followed by silhouette drawings of the covers of the preceding albums.

From the Makers of... was available in three formats:

- a box set of three vinyl albums (catalogue number PRO LP 1)
- a "Special Edition" circular metal container of the same three vinyl albums (catalogue number PRO BX 1)
- a box set of two cassettes (catalogue number PRO MC 1)

The 36 tracks are listed across four sheets (circular in the LP version), titled "Hit singles and stage classics in historical order", starting with "Pictures of Matchstick Men". Each title is accompanied by an appropriate picture. The final page chronicles the band's history year by year, from their beginnings in Peckham, South East London in 1962 through to the set's release in 1982.

The album reached number 4 on the UK Albums Chart.

== Track listing (LP set) ==
=== Disc one – side one ===
1. "Pictures of Matchstick Men" (mono) – 3:09
2. "Ice in the Sun" (mono) – 2:12
3. "Down the Dustpipe" (mono) – 2:04
4. "In My Chair" (mono) – 3:18
5. "Junior's Wailing" – 3:32
6. "Mean Girl" – 3:54
7. "Gerdundula" (mono) – 3:21
8. "Paper Plane" – 2:56

=== Disc one – side two ===
1. "Big Fat Mama" – 5:53
2. "Roadhouse Blues" – 7:28
3. "Break the Rules" – 3:37
4. "Down Down" – 3:53
5. "Bye Bye Johnny" – 4:42

=== Disc two – side one ===
1. "Rain" – 4:35
2. "Mystery Song" – 4:00
3. "Blue for You" – 4:06
4. "Is There a Better Way" – 3:30
5. "Again and Again" – 3:38
6. "Accident Prone" – 4:06

=== Disc two – side two ===
1. "Wild Side of Life" – 3:16
2. "Living on an Island" – 3:54
3. "What You're Proposing" – 4:15
4. "Lies" – 4:00
5. "Rock 'n' Roll" – 4:04
6. "Something 'Bout You Baby I Like" – 2:57
7. "Dear John" – 3:10

=== Disc three – side one: Live at the NEC 1982 ===
1. "Caroline" – 5:30
2. "Roll Over Lay Down" – 5:59
3. "Backwater" – 4:36
4. "Little Lady" – 4:26
5. "Don't Drive My Car" – 4:14

=== Disc three – side two: Live at the NEC 1982 ===
1. "Whatever You Want" – 4:27
2. "Hold You Back" – 4:46
3. "Rockin' All Over the World" – 3:50
4. "Over the Edge" – 4:27
5. "Don't Waste My Time" – 4:18

Disc three was made available as a separate album, Live at the N.E.C., in 1984. In 2010 the complete concert was released for the first time when the BBC included not only "Dirty Water" and "Down Down" (which had been bonus tracks on the Live at the N.E.C remaster in 2006) but also "Forty-Five Hundred Times", "Big Fat Mama", "Roadhouse Blues", "Rain" and "Bye Bye Johnny" as parts of the 7CD+1DVD collection Live At The BBC.

== Track Listing (cassette set) ==
=== Cassette one – side one ===
1. "Pictures of Matchstick Men" – 3:09
2. "Ice in the Sun" – 2:12
3. "Down the Dustpipe" – 2:04
4. "In My Chair" – 3:18
5. "Junior's Wailing" – 3:32
6. "Mean Girl" – 3:54
7. "Gerdundula" – 3:21
8. "Paper Plane" – 2:56
9. "Big Fat Mama" – 5:53
10. "Roadhouse Blues" – 7:28
11. "Break the Rules" – 3:39
12. "Down Down" – 3:53

=== Cassette one – side two ===
1. "Bye Bye Johnny" – 4:42
2. "Rain" – 4:35
3. "Mystery Song" – 4:00
4. "Blue for You" – 4:06
5. "Is There a Better Way" – 3:30
6. "Again and Again" – 3:38
7. "Accident Prone" – 4:06
8. "Wild Side of Life" – 3:16
9. "Living on an Island" – 3:54
10. "What You're Proposing" – 4:15
11. "Lies" – 4:00

=== Cassette two – side one (tracks 4–7 live at the NEC 1982) ===
1. "Rock 'n' Roll" – 4:04
2. "Something 'Bout You Baby I Like" – 2:57
3. "Dear John" – 3:10
4. "Caroline" – 5:30
5. "Roll Over Lay Down" – 5:59
6. "Backwater" – 4:36
7. "Little Lady" – 3:26

=== Cassette two – side two (live at the NEC 1982) ===
1. "Don't Drive My Car" – 4:14
2. "Whatever You Want" – 4:27
3. "Hold You Back" – 4:46
4. "Rockin' All Over the World" – 3:50
5. "Over the Edge" – 4:27
6. "Don't Waste My Time" – 4:18

== Charts ==
Chart (1982–1983)	Peak position
UK Albums (OCC)	4

== Certifications ==
Region	Certification	Certified units/sales
United Kingdom (BPI)	Gold	100,000^{^}
^{^} Shipments figures based on certification alone.
