= 12 Gold Bars =

Compilation album by Status Quo
- Released: 14 March 1980
- Recorded: 1972–1979
- Genre: Rock
- Length: 46:41
- Label: Vertigo

Status Quo chronology
Whatever You Want (1979)	12 Gold Bars (1980)	Just Supposin' (1980)

12 Gold Bars is a 1980 compilation album by the British rock band Status Quo. It reached number three in the UK charts and remained in the charts for 48 weeks. This was longer than any other Quo album.

All the songs featured on the album were hit singles during the period 1972–1979.

It was followed up by 12 Gold Bars Vol. 2 in 1984.

== Track listing ==
- Note: on the UK cassette version of the album, sides one and two were reversed.
- Note: the Australian & New Zealand version alternated "Paper Plane" and "Rain" with each other

=== Side one ===
1. "Rockin' All Over the World" (John Fogerty) – 3:34
2. "Down Down" (Francis Rossi/Bob Young) – 3:50
3. "Caroline" (Rossi/Young) – 3:44
4. "Paper Plane" (Rossi/Young) – 2:56
5. "Break the Rules" (Rossi/Young/Rick Parfitt/Alan Lancaster/John Coghlan) – 3:40
6. "Again and Again" (Parfitt/Andy Bown/Jackie Lynton) – 3:42

=== Side two ===
1. "Mystery Song" (Parfitt/Young) – 3:59
2. "Roll Over Lay Down" (Rossi/Young/Lancaster/Parfitt/Coghlan) – 5:43
3. "Rain" (Parfitt) – 4:34
4. "Wild Side of Life" (Arlie Carter/William Warren) – 3:16
5. "Whatever You Want" (Parfitt/Bown) – 4:02
6. "Living on an Island" (Parfitt/Young) – 3:47

== Charts ==
Chart (1980–82)	Peak position
Australian Albums (Kent Music Report)	14
Dutch Albums (Album Top 100)	26
German Albums (Offizielle Top 100)	19
Spanish Albums (AFYVE)	22
Norwegian Albums (VG-lista)	22
UK Albums (OCC)	3

Chart (2000)	Peak position
UK Rock & Metal Albums (OCC)	18

Chart (2013)	Peak position
Scottish Albums (OCC)	45

== Certifications ==
Region	Certification	Certified units/sales
Australia (ARIA)	Gold	20,000^{^}
United Kingdom (BPI)	Platinum	300,000^{^}
^{^} Shipments figures based on certification alone.
