= 12 Gold Bars Vol. 2 =

12 Gold Bars Volume II

Compilation album by Status Quo
- Released: 23 November 1984
- Recorded: 1980–1984
- Genre: Rock
- Label: Vertigo

Status Quo chronology
Live at the N.E.C. (1984)	12 Gold Bars Volume II (1984)	In the Army Now (1986)

12 Gold Bars Volume II is a 1984 compilation album by the British rock band Status Quo, released on Vertigo Records on 23 November 1984. It compiles all their UK hit singles from 1980 to 1984. The album was released as both an individual single album and as a double album with the first volume of 12 Gold Bars.

== Presentation ==
This compilation features all the band's UK hits from 1980 to 1984. Its release was preceded by a new single, "The Wanderer", a cover of the song by the American singer Dion. This was the last song that Status Quo recorded with bassist and founding member Alan Lancaster, who left the band in 1985.

The compilation reached number 12 in the UK charts and was certified gold in the UK. "The Wanderer" reached number seven in the singles chart.

== Track listing ==
=== Side one ===
1. "What You're Proposin'" (Francis Rossi/Bernie Frost) – 4:13
2. "Lies" (Rossi/Frost) – 3:56
3. "Something 'Bout You Baby I Like" (Richard Supa) – 2:48
4. "Don't Drive My Car" (Rick Parfitt/Andy Bown) – 4:12
5. "Dear John" (Jackie MacCauley/John Gustafson) – 3:11
6. "Rock 'n' Roll" (Rossi/Frost) – 4:04

=== Side two ===
1. "Ol' Rag Blues" (Alan Lancaster/Keith Lamb) – 2:48
2. "Mess of Blues" (Doc Pomus/Mort Shuman) – 3:18
3. "Marguerita Time" (Rossi/Frost) – 3:28
4. "Going Down Town Tonight" (Guy Johnson) – 3:36
5. "The Wanderer" (Ernie Maresca) – 3:30
6. "Caroline" (Live at the N.E.C.) (Rossi/Bob Young) – 4:58

== Charts ==
Chart (1984–85)	Peak position
Australian Albums (Kent Music Report)	80
UK Albums (OCC)	12

== Certifications ==
Region	Certification	Certified units/sales
United Kingdom (BPI)	Gold	100,000^{^}
^{^} Shipments figures based on certification alone.
