= Bula Quo! (album) =

Bula Quo

Soundtrack album by Status Quo
- Released: 10 June 2013
- Recorded: 2012 at ARSIS Studios
- Genre: Rock, hard rock
- Length: 1:16:23
- Label: Fourth Chord Records
- Producer: Francis Rossi, Rick Parfitt, Mike Paxman

Status Quo chronology
Quid Pro Quo (2011)	Bula Quo (2013)	The Frantic Four Reunion – Live at the O2 Academy Glasgow (2013)

Singles from Bula Quo!
- 1. "Bula Bula Quo (Kua Ni Lega)" Released: 12 April 2013; 2. "Looking Out for Caroline" Released: August 2013; 3. "GoGoGo" Released: September 2013

Bula Quo is the thirtieth studio album and the first soundtrack album by British rock band Status Quo, released on Monday 10 June 2013. It is the last Status Quo album recorded with drummer Matt Letley, who announced his departure from the band before the album had been released.

A double album, its release coincides with the band's first feature film of the same name, and features many of the songs from that movie. In addition to nine new songs, the album also features, on its second disc, new studio recordings of four of their previously released songs. One of these – "Living on an Island" – is a remake in a Fijian style (in keeping with the film's setting), while "Rockin' All Over the World" features in a special edited version. Two further studio recordings, "Frozen Hero" and "Reality Cheque", were culled from the band's previous studio release, Quid Pro Quo (2011).

The album also features six previously released live recordings, culled from the band's 2009 live album Pictures – Live at Montreux and the 2010 Official Bootleg album that was included with Quid Pro Quo.

To promote the album, Status Quo appeared on BBC One's magazine show The One Show on Tuesday 11 June 2013.

== Singles ==
In the June 2013, the first single from the album "Bula Bula Quo" was released as a download only, and also joined BBC Radio 2's playlist. August 2013 saw the release of the second single, "Looking Out For Caroline."

== Reception ==
Professional ratings
Review scores
Source	Rating
Liverpool Sound and Vision	3.5/5 stars

Liverpool Sound and Vision described the album as "reliable and still enough to make you smile" and "one for the long term fan" in a mostly positive review.

== Track listing ==
1. "Looking Out for Caroline" (Francis Rossi, Bob Young) - 4:00
2. "GoGoGo" (Rick Parfitt, Wayne Morris) - 4:16
3. "Run and Hide (The Gun Song)" (John Edwards, Stuart St. Paul) - 4:12
4. "Running Inside My Head" (Matt Letley) - 3:42
5. "Mystery Island" (Rick Parfitt, Wayne Morris) - 4:22
6. "All That Money" (Rick Parfitt, Wayne Morris) - 3:13
7. "Never Leave a Friend Behind" (Andy Bown, Stuart St. Paul) - 2:51
8. "Fiji Time" (John Edwards) - 3:15
9. "Bula Bula Quo (Kua Ni Lega)" (Francis Rossi, Bob Young) - 3:50
10. "Living on an Island (Fiji Style)" (Rick Parfitt, Bob Young) - 3:45
11. "Frozen Hero" (Francis Rossi, Andy Bown) - 4:20
12. "Reality Cheque" (Rick Parfitt, John Edwards) - 4:05
13. "Rockin' All Over the World" (Bula Edit)" (John Cameron Fogerty) - 4:27
14. "Caroline" (Live 2009) (Francis Rossi, Bob Young) - 6:19
15. "Beginning of the End" (Live 2010) (Francis Rossi, John Edwards) - 4:25
16. "Don't Drive My Car" (Live 2010) (Rick Parfitt, Andy Bown) - 3:49
17. "Pictures of Matchstick Men" (Live 2009) (Francis Rossi) - 2:29
18. "Whatever You Want" (Live 2010) (Rick Parfitt, Andy Bown) - 5:10
19. "Down Down" (Live 2010) (Francis Rossi, Bob Young) - 5:04

== Personnel ==
Status Quo

- Francis Rossi – lead vocals, lead guitar
- Rick Parfitt – lead vocals, rhythm guitar
- Andy Bown – keyboards, guitars, backing vocals
- John Edwards – bass, guitars, backing vocals
- Matt Letley – drums

Additional musicians

- Wayne Morris – extra guitars and backing vocals ("Go Go Go", "Mystery Island" and "All That Money")
- Freddie Edwards – extra guitars ("Run And Hide (The Gun Song)")
- Amy Smith – backing vocals ("Looking for Caroline", "Running Inside My Head", "Fiji Time", "Bula Bula Quo (Kua Ni Lega)" and "Living on an Island (Fiji Style)")
- Kathy Edwards – backing vocals ("Fiji Time")
- Amber Zakatek – backing vocals ("Bula Bula Quo (Kua Ni Lega)")
- Fursey Rossi – backing vocals ("Bula Bula Quo (Kua Ni Lega)")

Recorded at ARSIS Studios During 2012

== Charts ==
Chart (2013)	Peak position
Austrian Albums (Ö3 Austria)	27
Belgian Albums (Ultratop Flanders)	125
Belgian Albums (Ultratop Wallonia)	81
Danish Albums (Hitlisten)	38
Dutch Albums (Album Top 100)	41
French Albums (SNEP)	121
German Albums (Offizielle Top 100)	17
Irish Albums (IRMA)	86
Scottish Albums (OCC)	11
Swedish Albums (Sverigetopplistan)	27
Swiss Albums (Schweizer Hitparade)	13
UK Albums (OCC)	10
UK Independent Albums (OCC)	3

== Certifications ==
Region	Certification	Certified units/sales
United Kingdom (BPI)	Silver	60,000^{‡}
^{‡} Sales+streaming figures based on certification alone.
