= Never Too Late (Status Quo album) =

Studio album by Status Quo
- Released: 13 March 1981
- Recorded: 1980
- Studio: Windmill Lane (Dublin, Ireland)
- Genre: Rock
- Length: 39:02
- Label: Vertigo
- Producer: John Eden & Status Quo

Status Quo chronology
Just Supposin' (1980)	Never Too Late (1981)	1+9+8+2 (1982)

Singles from Never Too Late
- 1. "Something 'Bout You Baby I Like" Released: 20 February 1981

Never Too Late is the fourteenth studio album by British rock band Status Quo, co-produced by the group and John Eden. Released on 13 March 1981, it had been recorded at the same sessions – at Windmill Lane Studios, Dublin – as its predecessor Just Supposin'. It reached number two in the UK Albums Chart.

Only one single was released from the album: a cover of 'Something 'Bout You Baby I Like' (previously recorded by Tom Jones, and Glen Campbell with Rita Coolidge), backed with 'Enough Is Enough'. This was promoted with a music video directed by Godley and Creme.

This was the last album to feature the band's original drummer John Coghlan, who departed at the end of 1981, bringing an end to Status Quo's classic "frantic four" line-up. Coghlan was replaced by Pete Kircher, while Andy Bown, who had been contributing to the band for several years, was also made an official member.

"With Never Too Late, we began to lose the plot," recalled singer and guitarist Francis Rossi. "[Songwriter] Bob Young was cleverly promoted backwards. I've since learned that he was told the band didn't want him anymore."

== Reception ==
Professional ratings
Review scores
Source	Rating
AllMusic	3.5/5 stars
Sounds	4/5 stars

AllMusic's retrospective review criticized the heavy dose of keyboards in the mix but praising most of the individual songs. They commented of the album and its twin, Just Supposin', that "Neither is what one would describe as a classic Quo disc, but nor are they as disposable as some of the band's later releases."

== Track listing ==
Side one

1. "Never Too Late" (Francis Rossi, Bernie Frost) - 3:59
2. "Something 'Bout You Baby I Like" (Richard Supa) - 2:51
3. "Take Me Away" (Rick Parfitt, Andy Bown) - 4:49
4. "Falling in Falling Out" (Parfitt, Bown, Bob Young) - 4:15
5. "Carol" (Chuck Berry) - 3:41

Side two

1. "Long Ago" (Rossi, Frost) - 3:46
2. "Mountain Lady" (Alan Lancaster) - 5:06
3. "Don't Stop Me Now" (Lancaster, Bown) - 3:43
4. "Enough is Enough" (Rossi, Parfitt, Frost) - 2:54
5. "Riverside" (Rossi, Frost) - 5:04

=== 2005 remaster bonus track ===
1. "Rock 'N' Roll" (single version) (Rossi, Frost)

=== 2017 Deluxe Edition ===
Disc 1 Original album track listing

Disc 2

1. "Rock N' Roll" (7" single version) (Rossi, Frost)

Never Too Late Sampler - Austrian Flexi-Disc

1. "Don't Stop Me Now" (Lancaster, Bown)
2. "What You're Proposing" (Rossi, Frost)
3. LP Overview
4. "Something 'Bout You Baby I Like" (Richard Supa)
5. "Something 'Bout You Baby I Like" (acoustic instrumental demo) (Richard Supa)

Live at St Austell Coliseum, Cornwall on 7 March 1981

1. "Caroline" (Rossi, Young)
2. "Roll Over Lay Down" (Rossi, Parfitt, Lancaster, John Coghlan, Young)
3. "Backwater" (Parfitt, Lancaster)
4. "Little Lady" (Parfitt)
5. "Don't Drive My Car" (Parfitt, Bown)
6. "Whatever You Want" (Parfitt, Bown)
7. "Hold You Back" (Rossi, Parfitt, Young)
8. "Something 'Bout You Baby I Like" (Richard Supa)
9. "Rockin' All Over The World" (John Fogerty)
10. "Over The Edge" (Alan Lancaster, Keith Lamb)

Disc 3 Live at St Austell Coliseum, Cornwall on 7 March 1981

1. "Rock N' Roll" (Rossi, Frost)
2. "Dirty Water" (Rossi, Young)
3. "Forty-Five Hundred Times" (Rossi, Parfitt)
4. "Big Fat Mama" (Rossi, Parfitt)
5. "Don't Waste My Time" (Rossi, Young)
6. "Roadhouse Blues" (Jim Morrison, John Densmore, Robby Krieger, Ray Manzarek)
7. "Rain" (Parfitt)
8. "Down Down" (Rossi, Young)
9. "Bye Bye Johnny" (Chuck Berry)

== Personnel ==
Status Quo

- Francis Rossi - guitar, vocals
- Rick Parfitt - guitar, vocals
- Alan Lancaster - bass, vocals
- John Coghlan - drums

Additional personnel

- Andy Bown - keyboards
- Bernie Frost - backing vocals

== Charts ==
Chart (1981)	Peak position
Australian Albums (Kent Music Report)	33
Austrian Albums (Ö3 Austria)	9
Dutch Albums (Album Top 100)	15
German Albums (Offizielle Top 100)	12
Norwegian Albums (VG-lista)	12
Spanish Albums (AFYVE)	12
Swedish Albums (Sverigetopplistan)	14
UK Albums (OCC)	2

Chart (2017)	Peak position
UK Rock & Metal Albums (OCC)	25

== Certifications ==
Region	Certification	Certified units/sales
France (SNEP)	Gold	100,000^{*}
Spain (PROMUSICAE)	Platinum	100,000^{^}
United Kingdom (BPI)	Gold	100,000^{^}
^{*} Sales figures based on certification alone.^{^} Shipments figures based on certification alone.
