= It's Christmas Time (Status Quo song) =

Single by Status Quo

from the album Pictures - 40 Years of Hits
- Released: 8 December 2008
- Recorded: 2008
- Genre: Christmas music Hard rock
- Length: 4:10 (Original Version); 4:12 (Quo-eoke Mix); 3:39 (Edited Version)
- Label: Universal Music
- Songwriters: Rick Parfitt; Wayne Morris
- Producer: Pip Williams

Status Quo singles chronology
"The Beginning of the End" (2007)	"It's Christmas Time" (2008)	"Jump That Rock (Whatever You Want)" (2008)

"It's Christmas Time" is a Christmas song recorded by the British Rock band Status Quo in 2008. It was included in the compilation box set album Pictures - 40 Years of Hits. The single was released on 8 December 2008 and it was written by Rick Parfitt and Wayne Morris.

The song was released as a digital download, CD and 7 inch vinyl.

== Track listing ==
1. "It's Christmas Time" (4:10)
2. "Pictures of Matchstick Men" / "Ice in the Sun" [Live] (4:38)
3. "It's Christmas Time" [Quo-eoke Mix] (4:12)

== Charts ==
Chart (2008)	Position
UK Singles Chart	40
