= Whatever You Want (album) =

Studio album by Status Quo
- Released: 12 October 1979
- Recorded: December 1978 – March 1979
- Studios: Wisseloord (Hilversum, Netherlands)
- Genre: Hard rock
- Length: 42:12
- Label: Vertigo
- Producer: Pip Williams

Status Quo chronology
| If You Can't Stand the Heat... (1978) | Whatever You Want (1979) | 12 Gold Bars (1980) |

Singles from Whatever You Want
- 1. "Whatever You Want" Released: 14 September 1979; 2. "Living on an Island" Released: 16 November 1979

Professional ratings
Review scores
| Source | Rating |
|---|---|
| AllMusic | 3/5 stars |
| Smash Hits | 7½/10 |

Whatever You Want is the twelfth studio album by the British rock band Status Quo.

This was the band's third album to be produced by Pip Williams. Recording began in December 1978 at Wisseloord Studios in Hilversum, the Netherlands, with the final mixes being completed in London in March 1979. The album was released on 12 October 1979 and reached number three in the UK Albums Chart. The first single from the album – "Whatever You Want" – was released on 14 September 1979, with "Hard Ride" as the B-side, and reached a peak position of number four in the UK Singles Chart. The second single from the album was "Living on an Island", with the B-side "Runaway". This was released on 16 November 1979 and reached number 16 in the UK chart.

The album was remixed for the US market, where it was issued as Now Hear This in 1980. The US mix was finally released on CD as part of the 2016 deluxe remaster, although two songs, "Shady Lady" and "Your Smiling Face", were omitted . The US mixes of these two tracks are only available on the original US vinyl/cassette/8-track releases. The tracks "Whatever You Want" and "Living on an Island" were also swapped in the running order of the US remixed version.

== Re-releases ==
The album was first released in CD format in 1991, on a CD also containing Just Supposin'. To make the two albums fit the single disc, the track "High Flyer" was omitted, while the song "The Wild Ones" was omitted from Just Supposin'.

The album was digitally remastered and released in CD format in 2005. The first release was on 7 March 2005 by Mercury Records in the UK; the second on 12 July 2005 by Universal Records International in the US and elsewhere.

A 'Deluxe Edition' was released in 2016. This contained two discs; the first being the original album and the second containing a total of 15 tracks: 5 demos, an edited version, a non-album B-side and 8 remixes of tracks from the album which had been part of the Now Hear This US album released in 1980.

== Track listing ==
1. "Whatever You Want" (Rick Parfitt, Andy Bown) – 4:04
2. "Shady Lady" (Francis Rossi, Bob Young) – 3:00
3. "Who Asked You" (Alan Lancaster) – 4:00
4. "Your Smiling Face" (Parfitt, Bown) – 4:25
5. "Living on an Island" (Parfitt, Young) – 4:48
6. "Come Rock with Me" (Rossi, Bernie Frost) – 3:15
7. "Rockin' On" (Rossi, Frost) – 3:25
8. "Runaway" (Rossi, Frost) – 4:39
9. "High Flyer" (Lancaster, Young) – 3:47
10. "Breaking Away" (Rossi, Parfitt, Bown) – 6:44

=== 2005 remaster bonus tracks ===
1. "Hard Ride" (Lancaster, Mick Green)
2. "Bad Company" (Pip Williams, Peter Hutchins)
3. "Another Game in Town" (demo) (Rossi, Frost)
4. "Shady Lady" (demo) (Rossi, Young)
5. "Rearrange" (demo) (Rossi, Frost)
6. "Living on an Island" (single version) (Parfitt, Young)

== Personnel ==
Status Quo

- Francis Rossi – lead vocals, guitar
- Rick Parfitt – guitar, lead vocals on "Whatever You Want", "Your Smiling Face" & "Living On An Island" Co lead vocals on "Breaking Away"
- Alan Lancaster – bass, backing vocals, lead vocals on "High Flyer"
- John Coghlan – drums

Additional personnel

- Andy Bown – keyboards
- Bob Young – harmonica

== Charts ==
=== Weekly charts ===
| Chart (1979–80) | Peak position |
|---|---|
| Australian Albums (Kent Music Report) | 22 |
| Austrian Albums (Ö3 Austria) | 16 |
| Dutch Albums (Album Top 100) | 7 |
| German Albums (Offizielle Top 100) | 9 |
| Norwegian Albums (VG-lista) | 21 |
| Spanish Albums (AFYVE) | 7 |
| Swedish Albums (Sverigetopplistan) | 18 |
| UK Albums (Official Charts) | 3 |

| Chart (2016) | Peak position |
|---|---|
| UK Rock & Metal Albums (Official Charts) | 14 |

=== Year-end charts ===
| Chart (1980) | Position |
|---|---|
| German Albums (Offizielle Top 100) | 73 |

== Certifications ==
| Region | Certification | Certified units/sales |
|---|---|---|
| Australia (ARIA) | Gold | 20,000^{^} |
| France (SNEP) | Gold | 100,000^{*} |
| Netherlands (NVPI) | Gold | 50,000^{^} |
| United Kingdom (BPI) | Gold | 100,000^{^} |
^{*} Sales figures based on certification alone.^{^} Shipments figures based on certification alone.
