= Rockers Rollin' / Hold You Back =

"Rockers Rollin'" / "Hold You Back"

Single by Status Quo

from the album Rockin' All Over the World
- Released: November 1977
- Genre: Rock, boogie rock
- Length: 4:19; 4.30
- Label: Vertigo
- Songwriter(s): Francis Rossi; Rick Parfitt; Bob Young; Jackie Lynton
- Producer(s): Pip Williams

Status Quo singles chronology
"Rocking All Over the World" (1977)	"Rockers Rollin'" / "Hold You Back" (1977)	"Again and Again" (1978)

"Rockers Rollin'" / "Hold You Back" is a double A side single released by the British rock band Status Quo in 1977. It was only released in certain countries.

== Track listing ==
1. "Rockers Rollin'"
2. "Hold You Back"

== Charts ==
Chart (1978)	Peak position
Belgium (Ultratop 50 Flanders)	15
Germany (GfK)	30
Netherlands (Single Top 100)	6
