= Hurdy Gurdy Man (The Spectres song) =

1966 single by Status Quo

Single by The Spectres
- Released: 18 November 1966
- Genre: Garage rock
- Length: 3:15
- Label: Piccadilly
- Songwriter(s): Lancaster/Barlow
- Producer(s): John Schroeder

The Spectres singles chronology
"I (Who Have Nothing)" (1966)	"Hurdy Gurdy Man" (1966)	"(We Ain't Got) Nothin' Yet" (1967)

"Hurdy Gurdy Man" is a single released by the British rock band The Spectres (a predecessor of Status Quo) in 1966. This was the band's second single, and first to be penned by a member of the band. It was written by Alan Lancaster and a writer who sold his rights to the song to Pat Barlow. The B-side, although only credited to Lancaster, was co-written by Rick Parfitt, who at the time was not an official member of the band.

== Track listing ==
1. "Hurdy Gurdy Man" (Lancaster/Barlow) (3.15)
2. "Laticia" (Lancaster) (3.00)
