= Accident Prone (song) =

Single by Status Quo

from the album If You Can't Stand the Heat
- Released: 17 November 1978
- Length: 4:08 (7 inch edit) 5:04 (album version)
- Label: Vertigo
- Songwriter(s): Williams/Hutchins
- Producer(s): Pip Williams

Status Quo singles chronology
"Again and Again" (1978)	"Accident Prone" (1978)	"Whatever You Want" (1979)

"Accident Prone" is a single released by the British rock band Status Quo in 1978. It was included on the album If You Can't Stand the Heat. It was their only official single of the 1970s in Britain to fail to reach the Top 30.

== Track listing ==
1. "Accident Prone" (Williams/Hutchins) (4.08)
2. "Let Me Fly" (Rossi/Frost) (4.20)

== Charts ==
Chart (1978)	Peak position
Belgium (Ultratop 50 Flanders)	15
Germany (GfK)	19
Netherlands (Single Top 100)	10
UK Singles (OCC)	36
