= Live at the N.E.C. =

Live album by Status Quo
- Released: 1984
- Recorded: 14 May 1982
- Venue: National Exhibition Centre (Birmingham, England)
- Label: Vertigo
- Producer: Status Quo

Status Quo chronology
Back to Back (1983)	Live at the N.E.C. (1984)	12 Gold Bars Vol. 2 (1984)

Professional ratings
Review scores
Source	Rating
AllMusic	Review

Live at the N.E.C. is the second live album by British rock band Status Quo. It was recorded at the National Exhibition Centre in Birmingham on 14 May 1982. It had originally been released as part of the 3-LP box set From the Makers of... in 1982. In 1984 the recording became available as a separate album.

== Track listings ==
1. "Caroline" (Rossi, Young)
2. "Roll Over Lay Down" (Rossi, Young, Parfitt, Lancaster, Coghlan)
3. "Backwater" (Parfitt, Lancaster)
4. "Little Lady" (Parfitt)
5. "Don't Drive My Car" (Parfitt, Bown)
6. "Whatever You Want" (Parfitt, Bown)
7. "Hold You Back" (Rossi, Young, Parfitt)
8. "Rockin' All Over the World" (John Fogerty)
9. "Over the Edge" (Lancaster, Keith Lamb)
10. "Don't Waste My Time" (Rossi, Young)

=== 2006 remaster bonus tracks ===
1. "Dirty Water" (Rossi, Young)
2. "Down Down" (Rossi, Young)

=== 2017 Deluxe Edition ===
Disc 1

1. "Caroline" (Rossi, Young)
2. "Roll Over Lay Down" (Rossi, Young, Parfitt, Lancaster, Coghlan)
3. "Backwater" (Parfitt, Lancaster)
4. "Little Lady" (Parfitt)
5. "Don't Drive My Car" (Parfitt, Bown)
6. "Whatever You Want" (Parfitt, Bown)
7. "Hold You Back" (Rossi, Young, Parfitt)
8. "Rockin' All Over the World" (John Fogerty)
9. "Over the Edge" (Lancaster, Keith Lamb)
10. "Don't Waste My Time" (Rossi, Young)
11. "Dirty Water" (Rossi, Young)

Disc 2

1. "Forty-Five Hundred Times" (Rossi, Parfitt)
2. "Big Fat Mama" (Rossi, Parfitt)
3. "Roadhouse Blues" (Jim Morrison, John Densmore, Robby Krieger, Ray Manzarek)
4. "Rain" (Parfitt)
5. "Down Down" (Rossi, Young)
6. "Bye Bye Johnny" (Chuck Berry)

In 2010 the complete concert was released for the first time as part of the 7CD+1DVD collection Live at the BBC.

== Personnel ==
Status Quo

- Francis Rossi - vocals, lead guitar
- Rick Parfitt - vocals, guitar
- Alan Lancaster - bass, vocals
- Andy Bown - keyboards, vocals
- Pete Kircher - drums

One single was released from Live at the N.E.C. in 1982: "Caroline" b/w "Dirty Water" on 7" Vertigo QUO 10 (6059583) and 7"-picture disc Vertigo QUO P10 - furthermore a 12"-single (Vertigo QUO 1012) featured "Down Down" as the b-side's second track.

== Charts ==
Chart (1983–84)	Peak position
Dutch Albums (Album Top 100)	43
Swedish Albums (Sverigetopplistan)	45
UK Albums (OCC)	83

Chart (2017)	Peak position
Scottish Albums (OCC)	56
