= Just Supposin' =

Studio album by Status Quo
- Released: 17 October 1980
- Recorded: 1980
- Studios: Windmill Lane (Dublin, Ireland)
- Genres: Hard rock, boogie rock, new wave
- Length: 40:41
- Label: Vertigo
- Producers: John Eden, Status Quo

Status Quo chronology
12 Gold Bars (1980)	Just Supposin' (1980)	Never Too Late (1981)

Singles from Just Supposin'
- 1. "What You're Proposing" Released: 3 October 1980; 2. "Lies"/"Don't Drive My Car" Released: 28 November 1980; 3. "Rock 'n' Roll" Released: 20 November 1981

Just Supposin' is the thirteenth album by the British rock band Status Quo. Co-produced by the group and John Eden, it was recorded at Windmill Lane Studios, Dublin. Released on 17 October 1980, it entered the UK albums chart at number four.

The Windmill Lane sessions were highly prolific for the band, resulting in two albums worth of material, Just Supposin' and its follow-up Never Too Late, released the next year.

Initially, two singles were issued from the album, "What You're Proposing", and a double A-side, "Lies"/"Don't Drive My Car". At the end of 1981, after the release of Never Too Late, an edited version of another track from Just Supposin', the uncharacteristic ballad "Rock 'n' Roll", also appeared as a single.

"Over the Edge" was co-written by bass player Alan Lancaster and Keith Lamb, lead singer of British bands The Case, Sleepy Talk and Mr. Toad, and founder and lead singer of Australia's successful glam rock band Hush.

The cover art work features the launch phase of a UGM-84 Harpoon submarine missile.

== Reception ==
Professional ratings
Review scores
Source	Rating
AllMusic	3.5/5 stars

In their retrospective review, AllMusic mostly praised the album's set of songs, commenting that they "married the expected boogie to a new wave quirkiness that was straight out of the year's hippest fashion guides. It works, as well – for the most part, anyway."

== Track listing ==
Side one

1. "What You're Proposing" (Francis Rossi, Bernie Frost) – 4:18
2. "Run to Mummy" (Rossi, Andy Bown) – 3:12
3. "Don't Drive My Car" (Rick Parfitt, Bown) – 4:32
4. "Lies" (Rossi, Frost) – 3:56
5. "Over the Edge" (Alan Lancaster, Keith Lamb) – 4:33

Side two

6. "The Wild Ones" (Lancaster) – 4:02
7. "Name of the Game" (Rossi, Lancaster, Bown) – 4:29
8. "Coming and Going" (Parfitt, Bob Young) – 6:21
9. "Rock 'n' Roll" (Rossi, Frost) – 5:23

=== 2005 remaster bonus track ===
"AB Blues" (Rossi, Parfitt, Lancaster, John Coghlan, Bown) – 4:28

=== 2017 deluxe edition bonus tracks ===
"AB Blues" – B-Side (Rossi, Parfitt, Lancaster, John Coghlan, Bown)
"Coming and Going" - Writing version 1980
"Don't Drive My Car" - Live - Le Mans 1981
"Over the Edge" - Live - Le Mans 1981
"Rock N Roll" - Live - Le Mans 1981
"Something 'bout You Baby I Like" - Live - Le Mans 1981
"What You're Proposing" - Live - Le Mans 1981

== Personnel ==
Status Quo

- Francis Rossi – guitar, vocals
- Rick Parfitt – guitar, vocals, lead vocals on "Don't Drive My Car & "Coming and Going"
- Alan Lancaster – bass, vocals, lead vocals on "Over The Edge"
- John Coghlan – drums

Additional personnel

- Andy Bown – keyboards
- Bernie Frost – backing vocals
- Bob Young – harmonica on "Coming And Going"
- Danny Clifford – photography

== Charts ==
=== Weekly charts ===
Chart (1980–81)	Peak position
Australian Albums (Kent Music Report)	31
Austrian Albums (Ö3 Austria)	6
Dutch Albums (Album Top 100)	6
German Albums (Offizielle Top 100)	14
Norwegian Albums (VG-lista)	22
Spanish Albums (AFYVE)	7
Swedish Albums (Sverigetopplistan)	26
UK Albums (Official Charts)	4

Chart (2017)	Peak position
UK Rock & Metal Albums (Official Charts)	28

=== Year-end charts ===
Chart (1981)	Position
German Albums (Offizielle Top 100)	75

== Certifications ==
Region	Certification	Certified units/sales
France (SNEP)	Gold	100,000^{*}
Spain (Promusicae)	Gold	50,000^{^}
Switzerland (IFPI Switzerland)	Gold	25,000^{^}
United Kingdom (BPI)	Gold	100,000^{^}
^{*} Sales figures based on certification alone.^{^} Shipments figures based on certification alone.
