= Ice in the Sun =

Single by The Status Quo

from the album Picturesque Matchstickable Messages from the Status Quo
- B-side: "When My Mind Is Not Live"
- Released: 26 July 1968
- Recorded: 1968
- Genre: Psychedelic rock
- Length: 2:14
- Label: Pye Records
- Songwriter(s): Marty Wilde; Ronnie Scott
- Producer(s): John Schroeder

The Status Quo singles chronology
"Black Veils of Melancholy" (1968)	"Ice in the Sun" (1968)	"Make Me Stay a Bit Longer" (1969)

"Ice in the Sun" is a song by the band Status Quo. The track was recorded in 1968, and appeared on Picturesque Matchstickable Messages from the Status Quo, an album by Status Quo that was released in August that year.

"Ice in the Sun" was also released as a single in the UK in August 1968. Written by Marty Wilde and Ronnie Scott (not the famous jazz musician), and produced by John Schroeder, the song was Status Quo's second hit single.

It reached number 8 in the UK Singles Chart, spending twelve weeks in the listing, and number 29 in the Canadian RPM charts. In the U.S., the song peaked at number 70 on the Billboard Hot 100 and it was to be their last appearance in the U.S. charts.

The track has appeared on numerous compilation albums including XS All Areas - The Greatest Hits, Whatever You Want - The Very Best of Status Quo and From the Makers of....

== Singles ==
- 1968: "Ice in the Sun" / "When My Mind Is Not Live" 45 rpm 7" : Pye / 7N 17581
- 1968: "Hielo en el sol" / "Velos negros de melancolía" 45 rpm 7" : Pye / H 387
- 1969: "Ice in the Sun" / "Pictures of Matchstick Men" 45 rpm 7" : Pye / L-2222-Y

== Charts ==
Chart (1968)	Peak position
Australia (Kent Music Report)	48
Belgium (Ultratop 50 Flanders)	19
Belgium (Ultratop 50 Wallonia)	48
Canada (RPM)	29
Germany (GfK)	17
Ireland (IRMA)	17
UK Singles (OCC)	7
