= Roll Over Lay Down =

1973 single by Status Quo

Single by Status Quo
- Released: 13 May 1975
- Genre: Boogie rock; hard rock; blues rock
- Length: 5:40
- Label: Vertigo
- Songwriters: Francis Rossi, Bob Young, Alan Lancaster, Rick Parfitt, John Coghlan
- Producer: Status Quo

Status Quo singles chronology
"Down Down" (1974)	"Roll Over Lay Down" (1975)	"Rain" (1976)

"Roll Over Lay Down" is a song by the British Rock band Status Quo that was first released on the album Hello! in 1973.

It was later released as the A-side of a live EP, Quo Live on 13 May 1975. It was released to celebrate the band's 13th anniversary.

All of the tracks were recorded live and were taken from concerts at The Kursaal, Southend on 1 March 1975 and Trentham Gardens in Stoke the following night. The band released the EP against the advice of many people who predicted such a release would be a failure. It featured a picture sleeve that contained sleeve notes by BBC Radio 1 DJ John Peel. The centre of each copy of the record was specially moulded to feature the well known 'four heads' design (drawn by Dave Field) from the sleeve of the Quo album.

All three tracks were included as bonus tracks on the re-release of the On the Level album.

== Track listing ==
=== Quo Live EP ===
1. "Roll Over Lay Down" (Rossi/Young/Lancaster/Parfitt/Coghlan) – 5:40
2. "Gerdundula" (Manston James) – 2:45
3. "Junior's Wailing" (K White/M Pugh) – 3:50

=== Single ===
This single was released in France

1. "Roll Over Lay Down" (live)
2. "Where I Am"

== Charts ==
=== Weekly charts ===
Chart (1975)	Peak position
Australia (Kent Music Report)	2
Belgium (Ultratop 50 Flanders)	5
Belgium (Ultratop 50 Wallonia)	32
Germany (GfK)	15
Netherlands (Single Top 100)	2
New Zealand (Recorded Music NZ)	33
Norway (VG-lista)	7
Sweden (Sverigetopplistan)	20
UK Singles (Official Charts)	9

=== Year-end charts ===
Chart (1975)	Peak position
Australia (Kent Music Report)	23
