= Status Quo (band) =

British rock band

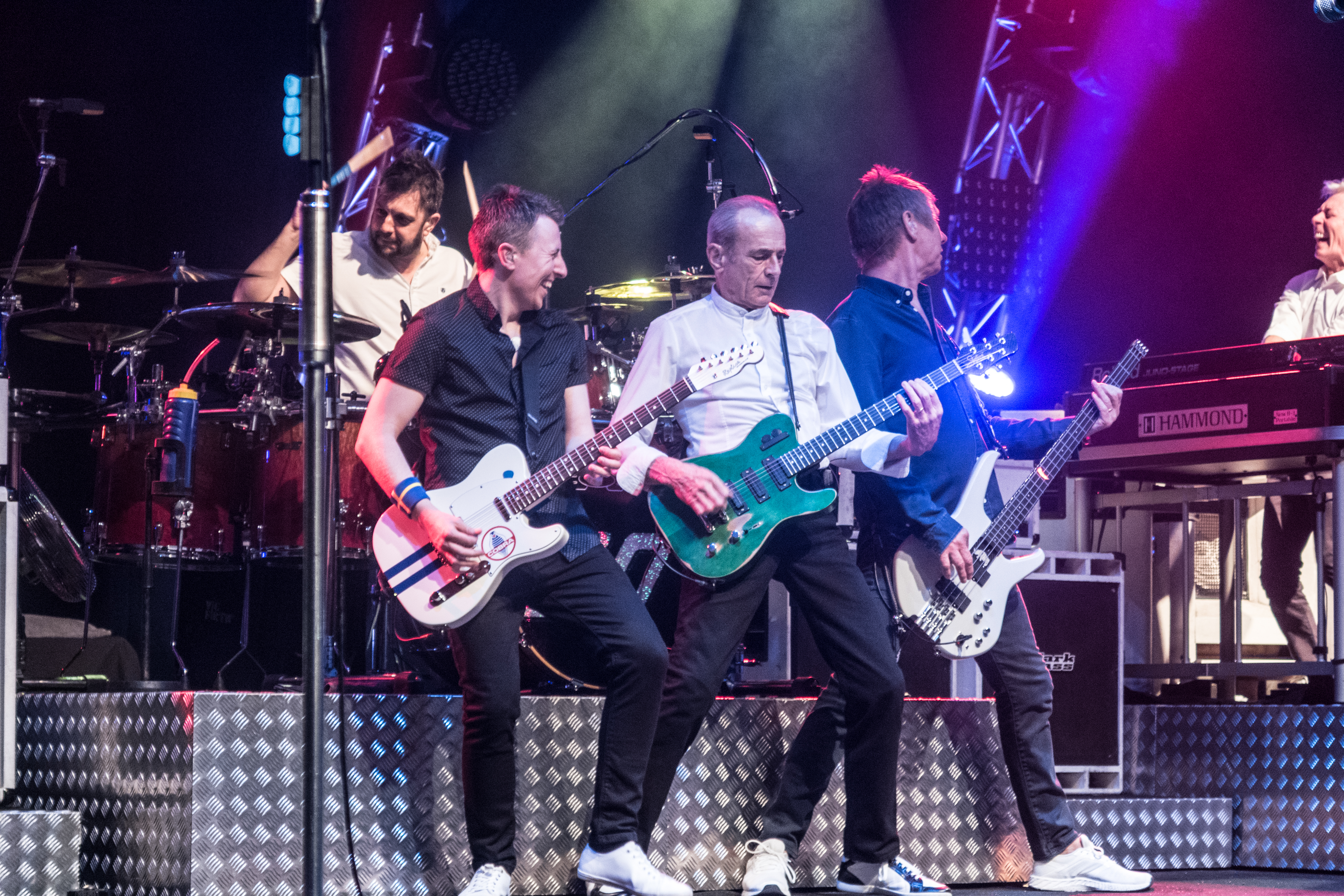
- Status Quo performing in 2017; From left: Leon Cave (on drums), Richie Malone, Francis Rossi, John "Rhino" Edwards, Andy Bown

Background information
- Also known as: The Paladins (1962–1963); The Spectres (1963–1967); The Traffic Jam (1967); The Status Quo (1967–1969)
- Origin: London, England
- Genres: Rock; boogie rock; hard rock; psychedelia (early)
- Works: Discography
- Years active: 1962–1984; 1985–present
- Labels: Pye; Vertigo; Capitol; Polydor; Eagle; Sanctuary; Mercury; Fourth Chord; Edel; Ear
- Members: Francis Rossi; Andy Bown; John "Rhino" Edwards; Leon Cave; Richie Malone
- Past members: See: Personnel
- Website: statusquo.co.uk

Status Quo are an English rock band formed in London in 1962. Beginning with "Pictures of Matchstick Men" in 1968, they have had over 60 chart hits in the UK – more than any other band – with further hits including "Caroline", "Down Down", "Rain", "Rockin' All Over the World", "Whatever You Want" and "What You're Proposing". 22 of these reached the Top 10 in the UK singles chart, and 57 reached the Top 40. They have released over 100 singles and 33 studio albums. Since reaching number five on the UK albums chart in 1972 with Piledriver, Status Quo have placed 29 consecutive studio albums on the UK charts, including 20 Top 10 studio albums. In 2012, they were announced as the tenth best-selling group of all time on the UK singles chart with 7.2 million singles sales in their homeland alone. As of 2015, they were one of only 50 artists to have achieved more than 500 total weeks on the UK Albums Chart.

In July 1985, Status Quo opened Live Aid at Wembley Stadium with "Rockin' All Over the World". In 1991, they received the Brit Award for Outstanding Contribution to Music. In 2014, preparing to headline that year's Download Festival, they won the Service to Rock award at the Kerrang! Awards. Status Quo appeared on the BBC's Top of the Pops more than any other band. Their success and longevity as well, in part, as their connections to the British Royal Family, including philanthropic work with the Prince's Trust, have seen them frequently described as a "national institution" by the media. According to Status Quo, they have sold over 118 million records worldwide.

== History ==
=== 1962–1967: Formative years ===
Status Quo were formed in 1962 under the name the Paladins by Francis Rossi (vocals, guitar) and Alan Lancaster (bass) at Sedgehill Comprehensive School, Catford, London, along with classmates Jess Jaworski (keyboards) and Alan Key (drums). In 1963, Key was replaced by John Coghlan and the band changed their name to the Spectres. After changing their name, Lancaster's father arranged for the group to perform weekly at a venue called the Samuel Jones Sports Club in Dulwich, London, where they were noticed by Pat Barlow, a gasfitter and budding pop music manager. Barlow became the group's manager and secured them spots at venues around London, such as El Partido in Lewisham and Café des Artistes in Chelsea. In 1965, when Rossi, Lancaster and Jaworski left school, Jaworski opted to leave the band and was replaced by Roy Lynes.

During 1965, the band played a summer season residency at Butlins Holiday Camp in Minehead, during which they met Rick Parfitt, who was playing guitar with a cabaret band called the Highlights. By the end of the residency, Rossi and Parfitt – who had become close friends – made a commitment to stay friends and work together at some point in the future. On 18 July 1966, the Spectres signed a five-year deal with Piccadilly Records, releasing two singles that year, "I (Who Have Nothing)" (first recorded by Joe Sentieri and covered by Shirley Bassey) and "Hurdy Gurdy Man" (an original song by Alan Lancaster), and one the next year called "(We Ain't Got) Nothin' Yet" (originally recorded by New York psychedelic band the Blues Magoos). All three singles failed to make an impact on the charts.

In 1967, the group's sound began moving towards psychedelia and they renamed themselves Traffic, but were soon forced to change it to the Traffic Jam to avoid confusion with Steve Winwood's new band Traffic, following an argument over who had registered the name first. The band secured an appearance on BBC Radio's Saturday Club, but in June their next single, "Almost But Not Quite There" (an original song by Francis Rossi), underperformed. The following month saw Parfitt, at the request of manager Pat Barlow, joining the band as rhythm guitarist and vocalist. Shortly after Parfitt's recruitment, in August 1967, the band officially became the Status Quo.

=== 1968–1970: Breakthrough and development of classic style ===
The Status Quo in 1968, from a promotional poster for the single "Black Veils of Melancholy" – clockwise from top: Francis Rossi, John Coghlan, Rick Parfitt, Roy Lynes, Alan Lancaster

In January 1968, the group released the psychedelic-flavoured "Pictures of Matchstick Men". The song hit the UK singles chart, reaching number seven; "Matchstick Men" became the group's only Top 40 hit in the United States, peaking at number 12 on the Billboard Hot 100. Although Status Quo's albums have been released in the United States throughout their career, they never achieved the same level of success there as they have in Britain. Though the follow-up was the unsuccessful single "Black Veils of Melancholy", they had a hit again the same year with a pop song penned by Marty Wilde and Ronnie Scott, "Ice in the Sun", which climbed to number eight. All three singles were included on the band's first album Picturesque Matchstickable Messages from the Status Quo, released in September 1968. After the breakthrough, the band management hired Bob Young as a roadie and tour manager. Over the years Young became one of the most important songwriting partners for Status Quo, in addition to occasionally playing harmonica with them on stage and on record.

After their second album, 1969's Spare Parts, failed commercially, the band's musical direction moved away from psychedelia towards a more hard rock/boogie rock sound. The change in sound also brought a change in image, away from Carnaby Street fashions to faded denims and T-shirts, an image which was to become their trademark throughout the 1970s. The new direction was displayed on the band's third album, 1970's Ma Kelly's Greasy Spoon and its preceding single "Down the Dustpipe". Lynes left the band in 1970 with the remaining members continuing as a four-piece, although they were often joined in the studio by guest keyboard players including Jimmy Horowitz, Tom Parker and Andy Bown, the latter an ex-member of the Herd and Judas Jump and part of the Peter Frampton Band. In 1976, Bown also began playing live with the band and was eventually made an official member of Status Quo in 1981.

=== 1970–1981: "Frantic Four" era ===
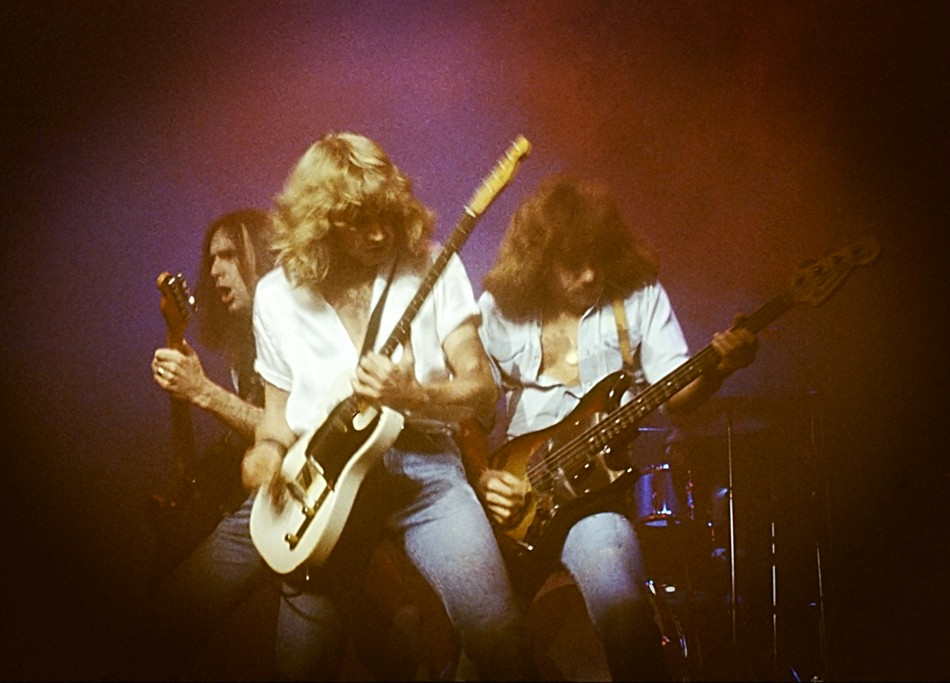
The "Frantic Four" line-up; left-to-right: Francis Rossi, Rick Parfitt, Alan Lancaster (obscured: John Coghlan) performing at the Hammersmith Odeon in London, 1978

The first recordings by the four-piece line-up, often referred to as "the Frantic Four", were the singles "In My Chair" (1970) and "Tune to the Music" (1971), followed by Status Quo's fourth album Dog of Two Head (1971). In 1972 the band left Pye Records and signed with the heavy rock and progressive label Vertigo Records. Their first album for Vertigo, Piledriver, was released in 1972, reaching number five in the UK. Piledriver heralded an even heavier, self-produced sound. This album was essentially the stylistic template for their next four albums, Hello! (1973), Quo (1974), On the Level (1975) and Blue for You (1976). Hello! was the band's first UK number one album, while Quo reached number two and On the Level and Blue for You both also reached number one. In 1976, they signed a pioneering sponsorship deal with Levi's. The following year the group released a double Live! album, which reached number three in the UK.

Quo's hit singles from this era, with peak UK chart position and year, include: "In My Chair" (number 21 in 1970), "Paper Plane" (number eight in 1972), "Caroline" (number five in 1973), "Break The Rules" (number eight in 1974), "Down Down" (number one in 1975), the Live! EP with "Roll Over Lay Down" as the lead track (number nine in 1975), "Rain" (number seven in 1976), "Mystery Song" (number 11 in 1976), "Wild Side of Life" (number nine in 1976), "Rockin' All Over the World" (number three in 1977), "Again and Again" (number 13 in 1978), "Whatever You Want" (number four in 1979), "Living on an Island" (number 16 in 1979), "What You're Proposing" (number two in 1980), the double A-side "Lies" and "Don't Drive My Car" (number 11 in 1980), "Somethin' 'Bout You Baby I Like" (number nine in 1981) and "Rock 'n' Roll" (number eight in 1981). "Down Down" topped the UK singles chart in January 1975, becoming their only UK number one single to date.

From 1977 onwards, the band's sound became more polished as they began to employ outside producers. Roger Glover of Deep Purple and Rainbow was the first outside producer to work with Quo since Pye's John Schroeder in the early 1970s, and produced the non-album single "Wild Side of Life" and its B-side "All Through The Night" in 1976. The next three studio albums, Rockin' All Over the World (1977), If You Can't Stand the Heat... (1978) and Whatever You Want (1979), were produced by Pip Williams, while the band's first two albums of the 1980s, Just Supposin' (1980) and Never Too Late (1981), were produced by John Eden. All five of these albums went top five in the UK. The title track of Rockin' All Over the World, a minor hit for its writer John Fogerty (formerly of Creedence Clearwater Revival), became one of Status Quo's most enduring anthems. In 1980 the band released a number three charting greatest hits album 12 Gold Bars.

=== 1981–1990: Line-up changes, Live Aid and In The Army Now ===
Tensions within the band saw Coghlan leaving at the end of 1981. His replacement was Pete Kircher from the 1960s pop band Honeybus, while keyboardist Andy Bown was also made an official member of the band. The new line-up recorded three albums, 1+9+8+2, Live at the N.E.C. (both 1982) and Back to Back (1983). During this period, Rossi and Lancaster's relationship deteriorated over musical differences, with Lancaster feeling Rossi, who now favoured a more pop/soft rock-based sound, was exerting too much control. Another dispute concerned the song "Ol' Rag Blues", the first single from Back to Back. Lancaster co-wrote the song and had recorded a lead vocal for it, but was angered when the producers chose to release a version with Rossi singing the lead vocal instead. Lancaster later cited Rossi's cocaine addiction, which lasted throughout the 1980s, as another major factor in the breakdown of their relationship.

Although contracted to record more albums, 1984 saw the band set out on what was intended to be their last tour, dubbed the 'End of the Road'. To coincide with the tour, the band released their second greatest hits album, 12 Gold Bars Vol. 2, for which they recorded a cover of "The Wanderer" by Dion. The song was issued as a single and reached number seven, while the album reached number 12. The last gig of the tour was on 21 July 1984 at the Milton Keynes Bowl. "Everybody was coked-up and hating each other", Rossi recalled, "and I'd started drinking tequila on that tour. I don't remember that show at all – the encores or anything; just falling flat on my back at one point." "Deciding to retire from the road – all that was about was getting Francis a solo career," declared Lancaster. "Nobody on the outside knew it, but he didn't want to work with me or Rick anymore."

Status Quo's final appearance with the Kircher line-up opened the Live Aid charity event at Wembley Stadium in July 1985. That year, Rossi recorded and released two solo singles with long-time writing partner Bernie Frost. Parfitt recorded a solo album, Recorded Delivery, with bass player John "Rhino" Edwards and drummer Jeff Rich. The album remains unreleased, although some tracks were reworked and released sporadically as Quo B-sides until 1987.

In mid-1985, Rossi, Parfitt and Bown, with Edwards and Rich, started work on a new Quo album. Lancaster – by this time more or less settled in Australia – took out a legal injunction to stop the band using the Status Quo name. The injunction also prevented the release of a single, "Naughty Girl", for which a catalogue number was issued by Vertigo. An out-of-court settlement was made in January 1986, giving Rossi and Parfitt the rights to the band's name, enabling the new line-up to continue work on the In the Army Now album, for which "Naughty Girl" was reworked as "Dreamin'". Lancaster remained in Australia, and in 1986 joined an Australian supergroup, the Party Boys, featuring Angry Anderson of Rose Tattoo, John Brewster of the Angels and Kevin Borich, but achieved little success outside Australia.

In 1986, Quo supported Queen on the latter's Magic Tour. The commercially successful In the Army Now album was released later that year, peaking at number seven on the UK Albums Chart. Its title track became one of the band's biggest UK singles, reaching number two. The following album, 1988's Ain't Complaining, was less successful but produced the number five hit "Burning Bridges". 1989's Perfect Remedy became their first album since 1971's Dog of Two Head not to go top 20 in the UK. In 1990 the band scored their last UK top 10 single with "The Anniversary Waltz Part One", a medley of rock and roll classics to celebrate the 25th anniversary of Rossi and Parfitt's first meeting. The track was recorded for a new greatest hits album Rocking All Over the Years, which reached number two in the UK, while a follow-up medley "The Anniversary Waltz Part Two" appeared as a single at the end of the year.

=== 1991–2009: Rock 'Til You Drop, Don't Stop and continued touring ===
The first half of the 1990s saw falling album sales for the band. To promote the release of 1991's Rock 'til You Drop, Quo performed four arena gigs in Sheffield, Glasgow, Birmingham and London in the space of 12 hours, earning them a place in the Guinness Book of World Records. 1992 brought the band's third live album, Live Alive Quo. The next studio album, 1994's Thirsty Work, included a cover of the Jennifer Warnes song "I'm Restless" revealing an alternative and lighter sound to the band. The 1996 covers album Don't Stop brought an upswing in the band's sales, reaching number two in the UK Album Charts, the band's highest-charting studio album of the 1990s, and producing three UK top 40 singles with covers of the Searchers' "When You Walk in the Room", the Beach Boys' "Fun, Fun, Fun" (with the Beach Boys themselves guesting on the track) and Fleetwood Mac's "Don't Stop". The band became involved in an acrimonious dispute with Radio 1 after the station refused to include the "Fun Fun Fun" single on the radio station's playlist.

Parfitt underwent quadruple by-pass surgery in 1997, but was able to make a full recovery and returned with a performance at the Norwich City Football Club ground Carrow Road three months later. Status Quo also returned to Australia in 1997, completing their first tour there since 1978. A greatest hits album, Whatever You Want – The Very Best of Status Quo, was also released, achieving silver sales in the UK that year. In 1999, Quo toured Germany, the Netherlands and Switzerland. Dubbed the 'Last Night of the Proms', the band were backed by a full orchestra during the concerts. That same year also saw the release of the album Under the Influence. At the request of the band's management, their first album of the 2000s, Famous in the Last Century, consisted almost entirely of cover versions (with the only exception being the title track) in the hope it would repeat the success of Don't Stop, though it proved only a moderate success.

In 2000 the band underwent its first line-up change in 15 years, when Rich was replaced by Matt Letley. Following the death of his wife, Andy Bown took time away from touring during 2000 and 2001, with his place temporarily taken by Paul Hirsh, formerly of Voyager. Bown remained the band's official keyboardist, and returned to touring in 2002. In November 2000, the band played a gig at Grandchester in the outback in Australia, performing on a carriage of Australia's Orient Express, the Great South Pacific Express.

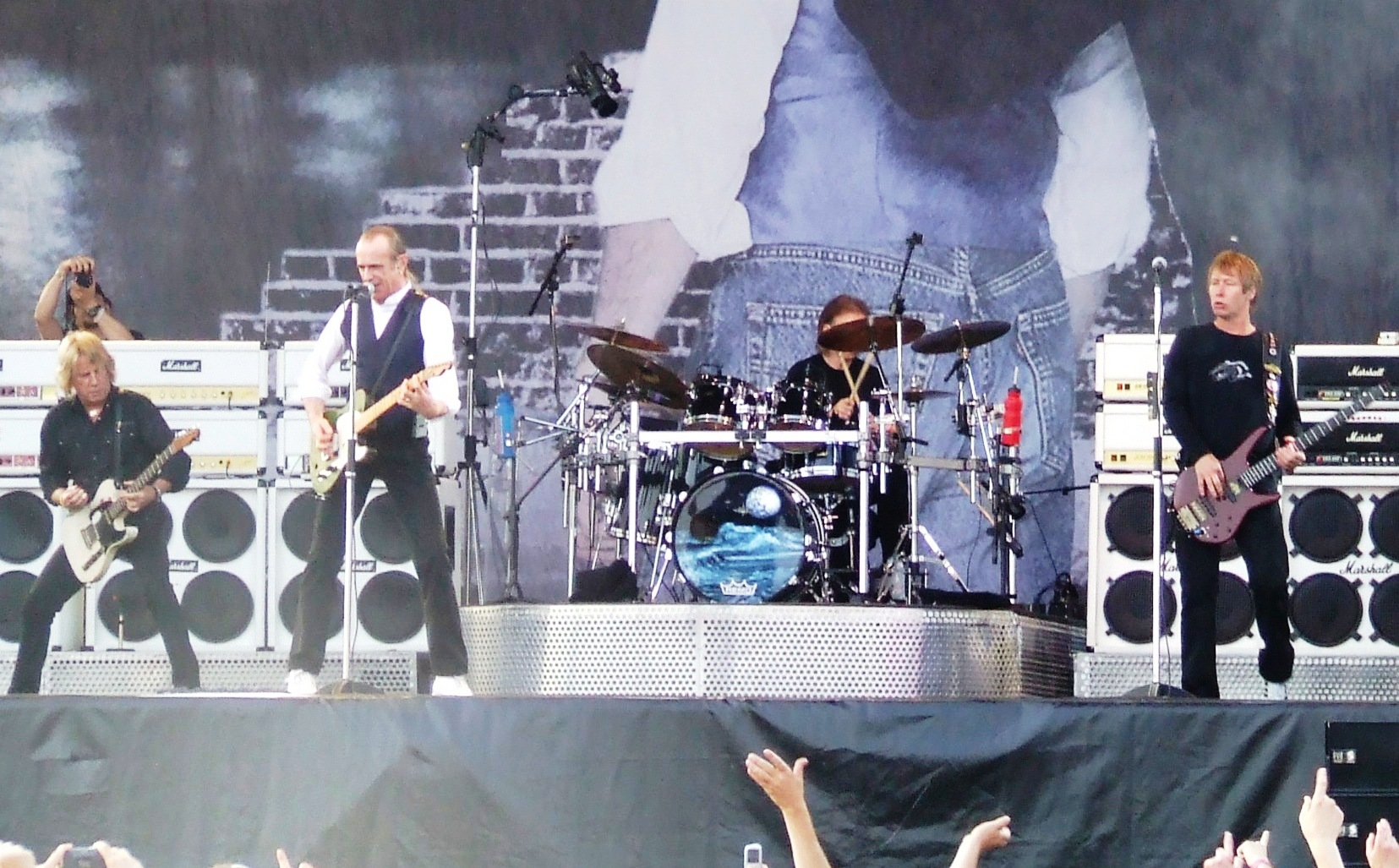
Performing at Arrow Rock Festival in Lichtenvoorde, the Netherlands in 2006; left-to-right: Parfitt, Rossi, Matt Letley (obscured by drums), John "Rhino" Edwards. Keyboardist Andy Bown out of shot.

Between 2002 and 2005, Quo released the albums Heavy Traffic, Riffs (another covers album) and The Party Ain't Over Yet. Another greatest hits album, XS All Areas – The Greatest Hits, appeared in 2004 with two new songs, "You'll Come 'Round" and "Thinking of You".

In December 2005, it was announced that Parfitt had been taken ill and was undergoing tests for throat cancer. All subsequent dates of the UK tour were cancelled as a result. However, the growths in Parfitt's throat were found to be benign and were successfully removed. In May 2006, a fully recovered Parfitt and the band returned to the NEC Birmingham to play the show that they had postponed in December. This was their 40th show at the venue, and was filmed for a DVD, entitled Just Doin' It.

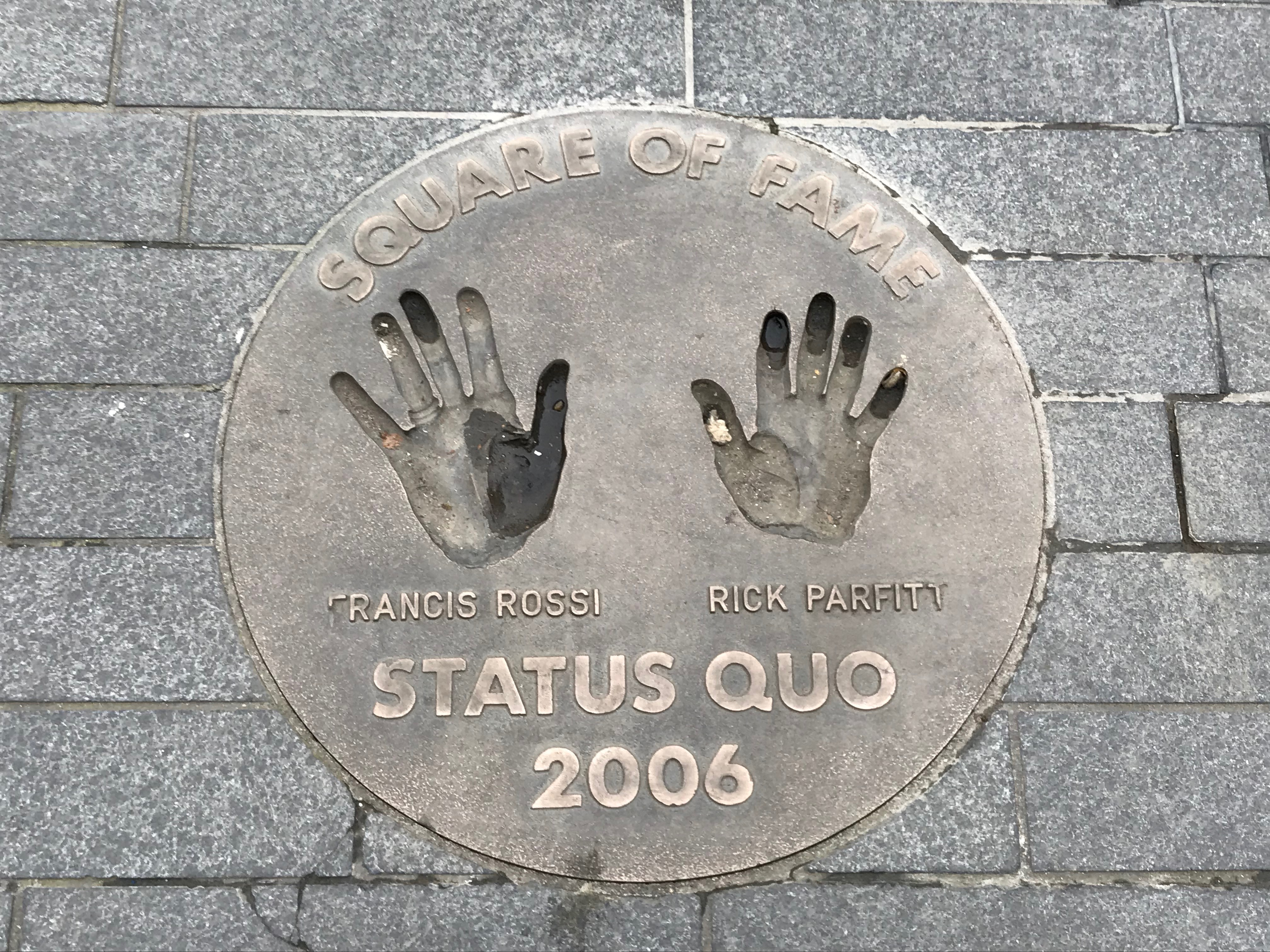
Handprints of Rossi and Parfitt of Status Quo at the Wembley Square of Fame in London

On 1 July 2007, they performed in front of 63,000 people at the newly built Wembley Stadium as part of the Concert for Diana. Their twenty-eighth studio album, In Search of the Fourth Chord, was released in September 2007, on the band's own Fourth Chord label in the UK, and on Edel Records in the rest of Europe. The title is a self-satirical response to the frequent criticism that they are a three-chord band. Produced by Pip Williams, who had worked with Quo on and off in the studio since 1977, the album was only moderately successful.

In 2008, they teamed up with German techno group Scooter to record a jumpstyle version of their 1979 single "Whatever You Want" entitled "Jump That Rock (Whatever You Want)". In December 2008, they released their 75th single and first Christmas single, entitled "It's Christmas Time", which peaked at number 40 in the UK Singles Chart. The track was from the new Pictures – 40 Years of Hits greatest hits album. The following year a new live album and DVD, Pictures – Live at Montreux, was released.

=== 2010–2013: Hello Quo, "Frantic Four" reunion tours and Bula Quo! ===
Rossi and Parfitt were each awarded the OBE in the 2010 New Year Honours for services to music and their long-standing charity work, including for The Prince's Trust, British Heart Foundation and Nordoff-Robbins Music Therapy. Classic Rock magazine reported on 17 March 2010 that the band had patched up their relationship with Lancaster, and were discussing the possibility of a future collaboration. The article stated "While the band are back on friendly terms with Alan, it's unlikely we'll see any future reunion, with Quo continuing as normal and Lancaster busy with charity events and overseeing the activities of his son's band The Presence".

On 20 September 2010, Status Quo was honoured with a PRS for Music plaque commemorating their first gig at the Welcome Inn in Well Hall Road, Eltham, where the band first performed in 1967. Later that month, on 26 September, a new version of "In the Army Now", titled "In the Army Now (2010)", was released through Universal / UMC as a single, with all profits from the single donated equally to the British Forces Foundation and Help for Heroes charities. Live at the BBC, a box set of sessions, live concerts and TV appearances at the BBC was released on 24 October 2010. The set was released in various formats: a full 7CD and 1DVD version covering almost all appearances, while the 2CD and 4CD versions present some highlights; the DVD was also released individually.

Their twenty-ninth studio album, Quid Pro Quo, was released in a deluxe format exclusively at Tesco on 30 May 2011. The regular edition was released elsewhere on 6 June. The album peaked at number 10 on the UK chart. December 2011 saw Status Quo undertake their first all-arenas UK winter tour. Quo also performed for the first time at The O2 in London. The tour was dubbed Quofest and featured Roy Wood and Kim Wilde as support for all shows, and joining the band during the encore.

The band's first cinematic documentary, Hello Quo!, was filmed in 2011 with director Alan G. Parker; it screened in cinemas on 22 October 2012, and was released on Blu-ray and DVD the following week. The documentary included contributions from Brian May, Jeff Lynne, Cliff Richard, Joe Elliott, Paul Weller, Joe Brown, Jim Lea, Andy Scott, and Steve Diggle.

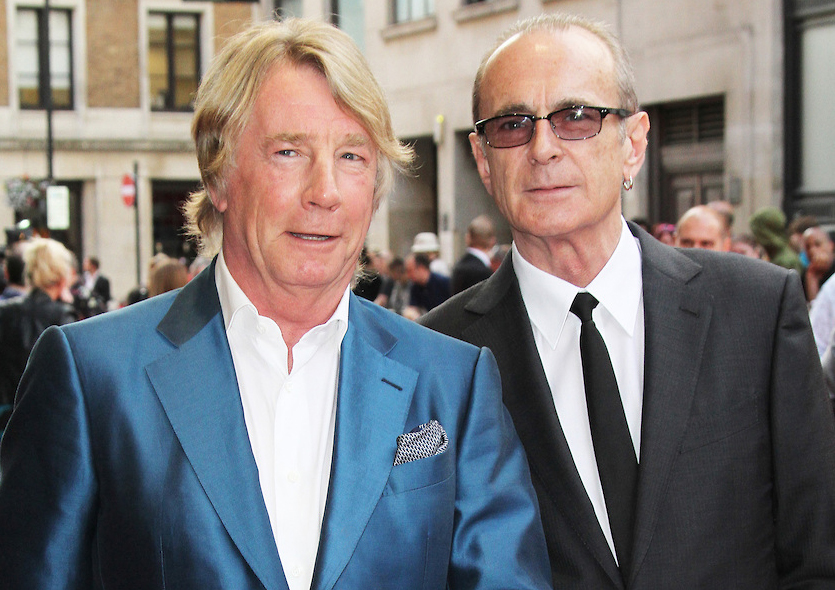
Parfitt and Rossi at the UK film premiere of Bula Quo! in July 2013.

In April 2012, Status Quo announced they were shooting their first feature film, over several weeks in Fiji. A 90-minute action comedy, entitled Bula Quo!, taking its name from the islanders' traditional Fijian greeting, and also referencing the title of the band's best-selling album, Hello! featuring the band as themselves, and also starring Jon Lovitz, Craig Fairbrass and Laura Aikman. The film was directed by Stuart St. Paul, produced by Tim Major and was released in cinemas on 5 July 2013. The film was accompanied by a soundtrack album of the same name, the band's 30th studio album, released on 10 June. It featured nine new songs and ten re-records and live tracks. Bula Quo! debuted in the UK chart at number 10.

On 9 July 2012, the band released the single "The Winner" for the 2012 Summer Olympics. In July 2012 Coles, an Australian national supermarket chain, signed Status Quo to record a version of "Down Down" using Coles' tag line 'Down, down, prices are down'. In September 2012, the band performed at Hyde Park for BBC Radio 2 Live in Hyde Park. In November 2012, Coles continued their association with Status Quo, producing a series of television adverts with the band appearing and performing "It's Christmas Time". In 2013, new adverts were released by Coles with Quo using "Whatever You Want" as the new jingle.

In December that year, Quo toured under the Quofest banner for a second year, this time supported by Bonnie Tyler and Eddie and the Hot Rods. In December 2012, Letley announced his decision to leave the band after 12 years, and subsequently departed following completion of their 2012 winter tour. However, Letley toured with Quo on their Australia and Mexico tour in March and April 2013, due to limited time to find a new drummer after the Frantic Four Tour.

The 1970–1981 line-up (Rossi, Parfitt, Lancaster and Coghlan) reunited as "The Frantic Four" in March 2013 for a series of dates in Manchester, Wolverhampton, Glasgow and London. Three live albums were issued from the tour, covering the O2 Academy in Glasgow (9 and 10 March 2013), the Hammersmith Apollo (15 and 16 March 2013) and the last date of the tour at Wembley Arena (17 March 2013), with the Wembley show also being filmed for a DVD.

In May 2013, Leon Cave became Quo's new drummer. In the latter months of 2013, Status Quo embarked on their Bula Quo tour, followed by nine concert dates in the UK during 2014. On 25 November 2013, it was announced that Status Quo would headline the second stage at the Download Festival in June 2014.

=== 2014–present: Aquostic, Parfitt's death and Backbone ===
In January 2014, Wychwood Brewery announced they would be releasing a Status Quo brand of beer, named after their 1972 album Piledriver, exclusively in JD Wetherspoon pubs across the UK in February, before going on general sale in April. March 2014 saw the second 'Frantic Four' reunion tour featuring Rossi and Parfitt with original members Lancaster and Coghlan with their last gig being at The O2 in Dublin, which was recorded and filmed for album and DVD release, both titled The Frantic Four's Final Fling. Rossi indicated that this would be the last reunion tour of the 'Frantic Four' line-up. On 8 March 2014, Rossi and Parfitt appeared on ITV show Ant & Dec's Saturday Night Takeaway performing "Rockin' All Over the World" with McBusted.

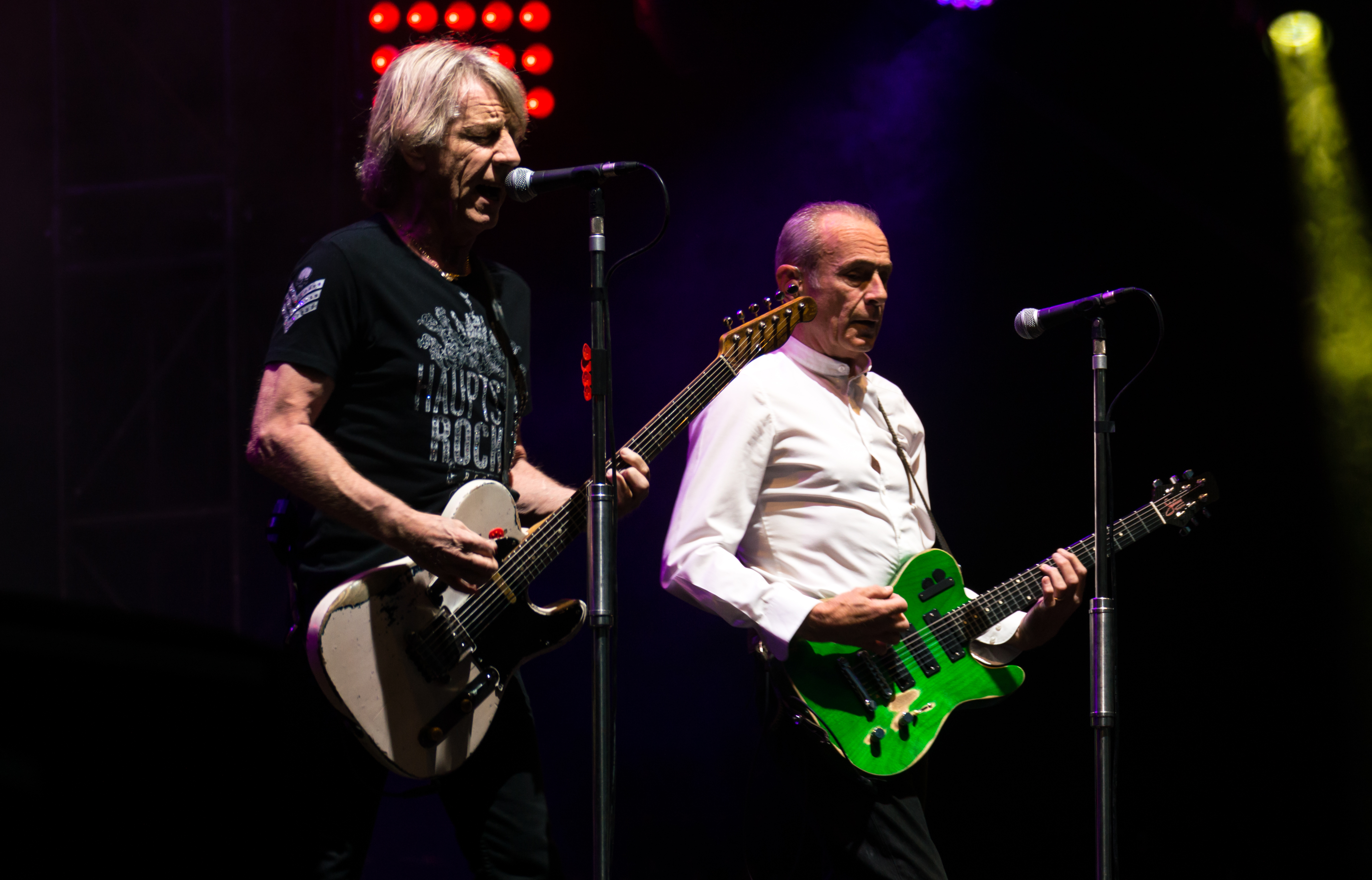
Parfitt and Rossi performing at Festival Pause Guitare, 2015

In August 2014, it was reported that founding keyboardist Jess Jaworski had died. In October 2014, Parfitt and Rossi appeared on BBC's The One Show, performing an acoustic version of "Pictures of Matchstick Men".

On 22 October 2014, the band launched their Aquostic – Stripped Bare album with a 90-minute performance at London's Roundhouse, with the concert recorded and broadcast live by BBC Radio 2 as part of their In Concert series. A live album and DVD of the concert, both titled Aquostic – Live at the Roundhouse, were issued in 2015. Footage from the concert was later used, interspersed with interviews with Rossi and Parfitt, in BBC Four's Status Quo: Live and Acoustic, in January 2017.

On 9 May 2015, the band performed "In the Army Now" at the VE Day 70: A Party to Remember. On 5 June that year, Status Quo were the headline act at Palmerston Park in Dumfries, at the stadium of Queen of the South and were supported by Reef and Big Country, in the first ever live concert at the venue.

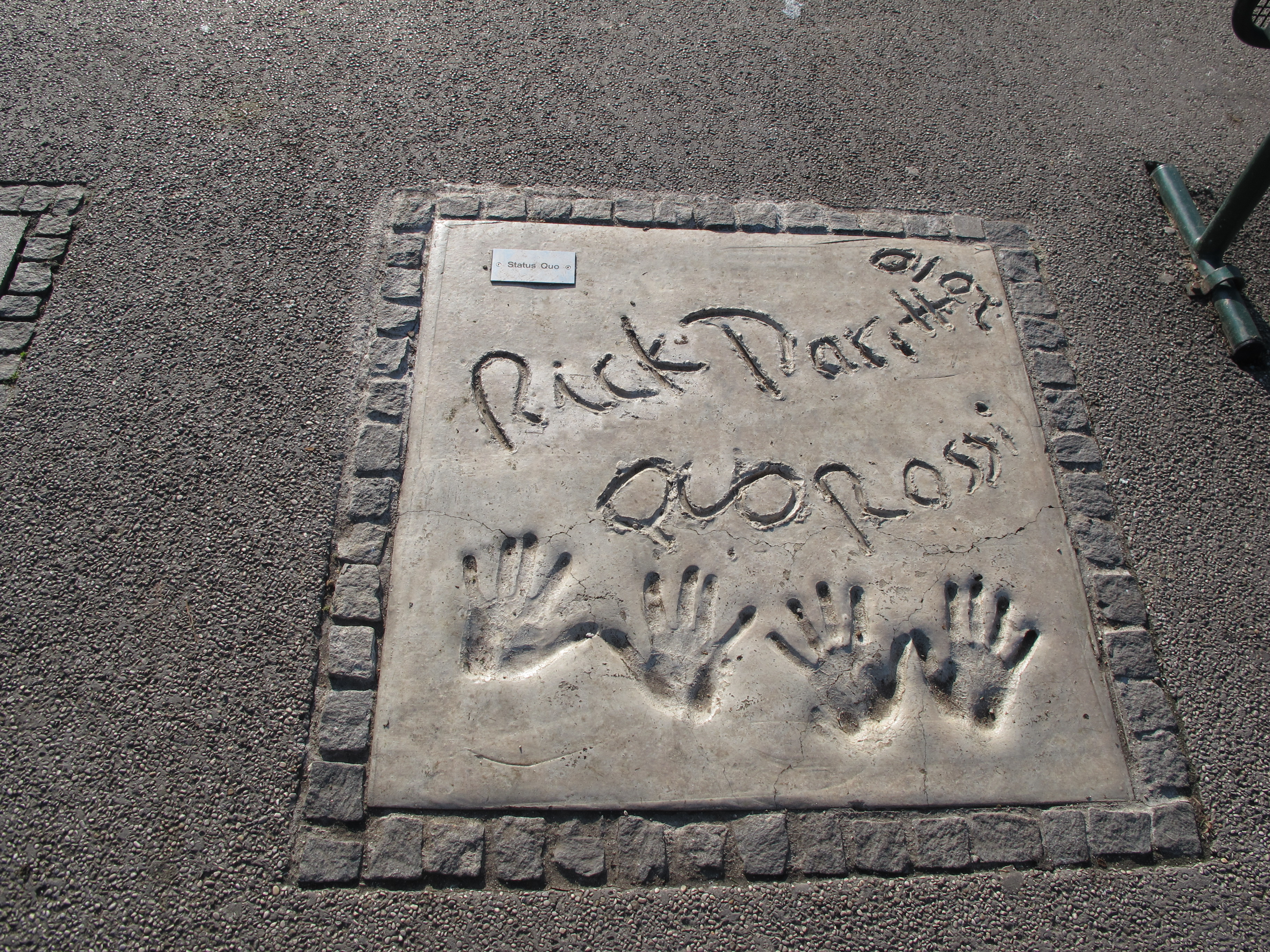
Handprints in the Munich Walk of Stars in Germany (pictured in 2015)

On 1 February 2016, it was announced that Status Quo, in addition to the spring and summer dates already scheduled, would tour Europe starting in October. The final dates would take place in the UK towards the end of the year, after which the group would retire from playing 'electric' tours. The 'Last of The Electrics' tour was subsequently extended into 2017, with additional concerts outside the UK. The band performed in Aquostic line-up at BBC Radio 2's Live in Hyde Park, in September 2016. Their next album Aquostic II – That's a Fact! was released on 21 October that year.

On 28 October 2016, Parfitt permanently retired from live performances after suffering a heart attack earlier the same year. On 24 December, he died in hospital in Marbella, Spain as a result of severe infection, after suffering an injury to his shoulder. Parfitt's funeral was held at Woking Crematorium on 19 January 2017. Irish guitarist Richie Malone, who had substituted for Parfitt during some 2016 live shows, took his place in the group on rhythm guitar, playing on both recorded material and at live shows. The band had to postpone a concert in June 2017 after frontman Rossi became ill.

2017 and 2018 saw the releases of three new live albums, The Last Night of the Electrics, Down Down and Dirty at Wacken and Down Down and Dignified at the Royal Albert Hall, with the former two also having companion DVD releases. In June 2019, Status Quo were the special guests for Lynyrd Skynyrd, on their UK farewell tour.

On 14 June 2019, the band announced that they were working on Backbone, their 33rd studio album – the first Status Quo studio album not to feature Parfitt. On 25 August 2019, the band appeared on ITV show The Sara Cox Show where Rossi spoke about the new album Backbone and his autobiography I Talk Too Much, after which they performed an upcoming track called "Liberty Lane" as well as "Rockin' All Over the World". Backbone was released on 6 September 2019 and reached number six in the UK Albums Chart. On 15 September 2019, the band performed at BBC Radio 2's Live in Hyde Park from Hyde Park, London for the third time. They were third from top of the bill, playing in the early evening and followed by Westlife and then The Pet Shop Boys. On Christmas Day 2019, the band appeared on Channel 4's The Great British Bake Off, performing "Rockin' All Over the World". In August 2020, Status Quo cancelled their forty-date Backbone UK and European tour because of the COVID-19 pandemic; various commitments for the following year meant the band were unable to reschedule the shows in 2021. On 26 September 2021, co-founder Alan Lancaster died at the age of 72 following a battle with multiple sclerosis.

The band's next tour, Out Out Quoing, took place in 2022, starting off in the UK, followed by concerts in Germany. In 2024, the band completed a UK and European tour, suggesting that their performance at Vivary Park, Taunton, on 23 August might be their final show ever.

== Touring data ==
Status Quo have performed a career total of at least 3,700 documented gigs as of September 2022. After the addition of early undocumented gigs and various lost performances, the concert total is likely to be higher and is estimated by the band to be over 6,000, with an audience in excess of 25 million people. The band have performed over a hundred gigs in a single year several times, with the recorded peak of 144 (1971), averaging a live show every 2.5 days. The band calculated that after 48 years of touring activity, they had "travelled some four million miles and spent 23 years away from home". With the exceptions of 1980, 1983 and 1985, Status Quo embarked on multinational tours every year between 1968 and 2019 (predominantly in Europe, though they have visited every populated continent).

== Personnel ==
Current members

- Francis Rossi – lead guitar, vocals (1962–present)
- Andy Bown – keyboards, rhythm guitar, harmonica, vocals (1981–present; session musician in 1973, session/touring musician 1976–1981)
- John "Rhino" Edwards – bass, rhythm guitar, vocals (1985–present)
- Leon Cave – drums, percussion, vocals (2013–present)
- Richie Malone – rhythm guitar, vocals (2016–present)

Former members

- Alan Lancaster – bass, vocals (1962–1985; reunion during 2013–2014; died 2021)
- Jess Jaworski – keyboards, vocals (1962–1965; died 2014)
- Alan Key – drums, percussion (1962–1963)
- John Coghlan – drums, percussion (1963–1981; reunion during 2013–2014)
- Roy Lynes – keyboards, vocals (1965–1970)
- Rick Parfitt – rhythm guitar, vocals (1967–2016; died 2016)
- Pete Kircher – drums, percussion, vocals (1981–1985)
- Jeff Rich – drums, percussion (1985–2000)
- Matt Letley – drums, percussion, vocals (2000–2013)

== Discography ==
Studio albums

- Picturesque Matchstickable Messages from the Status Quo (1968)
- Spare Parts (1969)
- Ma Kelly's Greasy Spoon (1970)
- Dog of Two Head (1971)
- Piledriver (1972)
- Hello! (1973)
- Quo (1974)
- On the Level (1975)
- Blue for You (1976)
- Rockin' All Over the World (1977)
- If You Can't Stand the Heat... (1978)
- Whatever You Want (1979)
- Just Supposin' (1980)
- Never Too Late (1981)
- 1+9+8+2 (1982)
- Back to Back (1983)
- In the Army Now (1986)
- Ain't Complaining (1988)
- Perfect Remedy (1989)
- Rock 'til You Drop (1991)
- Thirsty Work (1994)
- Don't Stop (1996)
- Under the Influence (1999)
- Famous in the Last Century (2000)
- Heavy Traffic (2002)
- Riffs (2003)
- The Party Ain't Over Yet (2005)
- In Search of the Fourth Chord (2007)
- Quid Pro Quo (2011)
- Bula Quo! (2013)
- Aquostic – Stripped Bare (2014)
- Aquostic II – That's a Fact! (2016)
- Backbone (2019)

== Remakes and cover versions ==
- In 1989, American alternative rock group Camper Van Beethoven scored a number one hit on Billboard magazine's Modern Rock Tracks chart with a cover version of "Pictures of Matchstick Men". The song is from their album Key Lime Pie. British alternative rock band Kasabian released their own cover version of the same song as a B-side from their 2006 single Shoot the Runner.
- The 1996 re-issue of the album Too-Rye-Ay by Dexys Midnight Runners contained a cover version of "Marguerita Time".
- Ozzy Osbourne, backed by Type O Negative, covered "Pictures of Matchstick Men" as part of the soundtrack to the Howard Stern biographical movie Private Parts in 1997.
- Towards the end of his life, DJ John Peel was known for playing "Down Down" as part of his eclectic DJ sets.
- Arjen Lucassen (from the Dutch project Ayreon) covered "Pictures Of Matchstick Men" and "Ice in the Sun" on his solo album Strange Hobby.
- Bad Religion guitarist Brett Gurewitz recorded a cover version of "Pictures of Matchstick Men" on his 1985 solo album Seeing Eye Gods.
- German power metal band Helloween covered "Rain" for their single "Power". It is also on the bonus disc of the special edition of their 1996 album, The Time of the Oath.
