= Somethin' 'Bout You Baby I Like =

1974 single by Tom Jones

Single by Tom Jones

from the album Somethin' 'Bout You Baby I Like
- B-side: "Keep A-Talkin' 'Bout Love"
- Released: 16 August 1974 (UK); September 1974 (US)
- Genre: Pop, easy listening
- Length: 3:25
- Label: Decca, Parrot
- Songwriter: Richard Supa
- Producer: Gordon Mills

Tom Jones singles chronology
"Letter to Lucille" (1973)	"Somethin' 'Bout You Baby I Like" (1974)	"Pledging My Love" (1975)

"Somethin' 'Bout You Baby I Like"

Single by Glen Campbell & Rita Coolidge

from the album Somethin' 'Bout You Baby I Like
- B-side: "Late Night Confession" (Campbell)
- Released: May 1980
- Length: 2:45
- Label: Capitol
- Songwriter: Richard Supa
- Producer: Gary Klein

"Somethin' 'Bout You Baby I Like" is a popular song written by guitarist Richard Supa in the early 1970s. The version by Tom Jones reached No. 36 in the UK in 1974. Glen Campbell and Rita Coolidge reached No. 42 in the US with their recording of the song in 1980.

== Chart history ==
Tom Jones

Chart (1974)	Peak position
Canada RPM Adult Contemporary	44
UK (OCC)	36
U.S. Billboard Adult Contemporary	23

Trini Lopez

Chart (1975)	Peak position
U.S. Cash Box Top 100	76

Glen Campbell & Rita Coolidge

Chart (1980)	Peak position
Canada RPM Adult Contemporary	36
U.S. Billboard Hot 100	42
U.S. Billboard Adult Contemporary	39

== Status Quo cover ==
"Something 'Bout You Baby I Like"

Single by Status Quo

from the album Never Too Late
- B-side: "Enough Is Enough"
- Released: 20 February 1981
- Genre: Rock; blues rock
- Length: 2:50
- Label: Vertigo
- Songwriter: R Supa
- Producers: Status Quo and John Eden

Status Quo singles chronology
"Lies" (1980)	"Something 'Bout You Baby I Like" (1981)	"Rock 'n' Roll" (1981)

"Something 'Bout You Baby I Like" was covered as a single by the British Rock band Status Quo in 1981. It was included on the album Never Too Late.

The version by Glen Campbell and Rita Coolidge prompted Francis Rossi of Status Quo to cover the song. The picture sleeve for the band's version was available in three different colour schemes - full multi-colour, blue print and red print. The majority of the 150,000 sleeves printed were the intended 'full colour' print.

=== Track listing ===
1. "Something 'Bout You Baby I Like" (Richard Supa) (2.50)
2. "Enough Is Enough" (Francis Rossi, Bernie Frost, Rick Parfitt) (2.52)

=== Charts ===
Chart (1981)	Peak position
Australia (Kent Music Report)	89
France (IFOP)	45
Germany (GfK)	49
Ireland (IRMA)	7
Netherlands (Dutch Top 40)	37
Netherlands (Single Top 100)	15
Norway (VG-lista)	9
Spain (AFYVE	8
Switzerland (Schweizer Hitparade)	10
UK Singles (Official Charts)	9
