= Again and Again (Status Quo song) =

1978 single by Status Quo

Single by Status Quo

from the album If You Can't Stand the Heat
- B-side: "Too Far Gone"
- Released: 25 August 1978
- Genre: Rock
- Length: 3:40
- Label: Vertigo
- Songwriters: Rick Parfitt; Andy Bown; Jackie Lynton
- Producer: Pip Williams

Status Quo singles chronology
"Rockers Rollin' / Hold You Back" (1977)	"Again and Again" (1978)	"Accident Prone" (1978)

"Again and Again" is a single released by the British rock band Status Quo in 1978. The song was written by Rick Parfitt, Andy Bown and Jackie Lynton and was issued to coincide with the band's headline appearance at the Reading Festival on 26 August 1978.

The song was reprised in 2014 for the band's thirty-first studio album Aquostic (Stripped Bare). It was featured in the ninety-minute launch performance of the album at London's Roundhouse on 22 October, a concert which was recorded and broadcast live by BBC Radio 2 as part of their In Concert series.

== Track listing ==
1. "Again and Again" (Parfitt/Bown/Lynton) (3.40)
2. "Too Far Gone" (Lancaster) (3.12)

== Charts ==
Chart (1978)	Peak position
Belgium (Ultratop 50 Flanders)	28
Ireland (IRMA)	5
Germany (GfK)	18
Netherlands (Single Top 100)	9
Switzerland (Schweizer Hitparade)	8
UK Singles (OCC)	13
