= What You're Proposing =

1980 single by Status Quo

Single by Status Quo

from the album Just Supposin'
- Released: 3 October 1980
- Genre: Rock
- Length: 4:13
- Label: Vertigo
- Songwriters: Francis Rossi, Bernie Frost
- Producers: Status Quo and John Eden

Status Quo singles chronology
"Living on an Island" (1979)	"What You're Proposing" (1980)	"Lies" (1980)

"What You're Proposing" is a single released by the British rock band Status Quo in 1980. It was included on their album Just Supposin'.

The B-side is "A B Blues", a non-album instrumental studio jam. Some later pressings of this single mis-credited Andy Bown as Andy Brown on the B-side composer's credit. The initial pressing run of 75,000 copies of this single were issued with a colour picture sleeve.

The song was reprised, in 2014, for the band's thirty-first studio album Aquostic (Stripped Bare). It was featured in the ninety-minute launch performance of the album at London's Roundhouse on 22 October, the concert being recorded and broadcast live by BBC Radio 2 as part of their In Concert series.

== Track listing ==
1. "What You're Proposing" (Rossi/Frost) (4.13)
2. "A B Blues" (Rossi/Parfitt/Lancaster/Coghlan/Bown) (4.33)

== Charts ==
Chart (1980)	Peak position
Australia (Kent Music Report)	62
Austria (Ö3 Austria Top 40)	4
Belgium (Ultratop 50 Flanders)	7
France (IFOP)	34
Germany (GfK)	7
Ireland (IRMA)	2
Netherlands (Dutch Top 40)	7
Netherlands (Single Top 100)	4
Spain (AFYVE)	3
Switzerland (Schweizer Hitparade)	2
UK Singles (Official Charts)	2
Zimbabwe (ZIMA)	14
