= Break the Rules (Status Quo song) =

Single by Status Quo

from the album Quo
- B-side: "Lonely Night"
- Released: 26 April 1974
- Genre: Rock, boogie rock, blues rock
- Length: 3:38
- Label: Vertigo
- Songwriter(s): Francis Rossi, Rick Parfitt, Alan Lancaster, John Coghlan, Bob Young
- Producer(s): Status Quo

Status Quo singles chronology
"Caroline" (1973)	"Break the Rules" (1974)	"Down Down" (1974)

"Break the Rules" is a song by British rock band Status Quo from their album Quo (1974). It was the only single released from the album, though it had not been the band's choice, as they wanted the track "Backwater" to be the single.

The B-side of the single was "Lonely Night", which was not on an album until it became a bonus track on the 2005 reissue of Quo. Some copies of the single were mis-pressed with the moulded label for "Lonely Night" on both sides. Two years after release, "Lonely Night" was plagiarised by Australian band the Angels in their song "Am I Ever Gonna See Your Face Again", for which Status Quo subsequently received royalties.

== Track listing ==
1. "Break the Rules" (Rossi/Young/Parfitt/Lancaster/Coghlan) (3.38)
2. "Lonely Night" (Parfitt/Lancaster/Rossi/Young/Coghlan) (3.21)

== Charts ==
Chart (1974)	Peak position
French Singles (SNEP)	31
Germany (GfK)	18
UK Singles (OCC)	8

== Cover versions ==
"Break the Rules" was covered by the Western Sizzlers, on their debut album For Ol' Times Sake in 2013. The band were put together by Kevin Jennings, ex Georgia Satellites Manager, and self-confessed Quo fan.
