= Lies (Status Quo song) =

"Lies" / "Don't Drive My Car"

Single by Status Quo

from the album Just Supposin'
- Released: 28 November 1980
- Genre: Rock
- Length: 3:56 and 4:12
- Label: Vertigo
- Songwriters: Rossi/Frost and Parfitt/Bown
- Producers: Status Quo and John Eden

Status Quo singles chronology
"What You're Proposing" (1980)	"Lies" / "Don't Drive My Car" (1980)	"Something 'Bout You Baby I Like" (1981)

"Lies" / "Don't Drive My Car" is a double A-side single released by the British rock band Status Quo in 1980.

== Lies ==
"Lies" was considered to be the most commercial of the two. Both songs were included on the album Just Supposin'.

250,000 copies were issued with a picture sleeve; the first 100,000 printed in colour, the rest were printed in black and white.

== Don't Drive My Car ==
"Don't Drive My Car" was mispressed twice - once as "Don't Drive My CAF" (French pressing) and once as "Don't Drive MYICAR" (later UK pressing).

The song was reprised, in 2014, for the band's thirty-first studio album Aquostic (Stripped Bare). It was featured in the ninety-minute launch performance of the album at London's Roundhouse on 22 October, the concert being recorded and broadcast live by BBC Radio 2 as part of their In Concert series.

== Track listing ==
1. "Lies" (Rossi/Frost) (3.56)
2. "Don't Drive My Car" (Parfitt/Bown) (4.12)

== Charts ==
Chart (1980–1981)	Peak position
Austria (Ö3 Austria Top 40)	9
Belgium (Ultratop 50 Flanders)	31
Germany (GfK)	24
Ireland (IRMA)	10
Netherlands (Single Top 100)	5
UK Singles (OCC)	11

== Certifications ==
Region	Certification	Certified units/sales
United Kingdom (BPI)	Silver	250,000^{^}
^{^} Shipments figures based on certification alone.
