= Rock 'n' Roll (Status Quo song) =

1981 single by Status Quo

Single by Status Quo

from the album Just Supposin'
- Released: 20 November 1981
- Genre: Rock; pop
- Length: 4:04
- Label: Vertigo
- Songwriter: Rossi/Frost
- Producers: Status Quo and John Eden

Status Quo singles chronology
| "Something 'Bout You Baby I Like" (1981) | "Rock 'n' Roll" (1981) | "Dear John" (1982) |

"Rock 'n' Roll" is a single released by the British rock band Status Quo in 1981. It was included on the album Just Supposin'. It was written in Ireland by Francis Rossi and Bernie Frost during a stay in the country, and was not originally intended to be recorded by Status Quo themselves.

The song was reprised in 2014 for the band's thirty-first studio album Aquostic – Stripped Bare. It was featured in the ninety-minute launch performance of the album at London's Roundhouse on 22 October, the concert being recorded and broadcast live by BBC Radio 2 as part of their In Concert series.

== Track listing ==
- A "Rock 'n' Roll" (Rossi/Frost) (4.04)
- B1 "Hold You Back" (Rossi/Young/Parfitt) (4.22)
- B2 "Backwater" (Parfitt/Lancaster) (4.21)

== Charts ==
| Chart (1981) | Peak position |
|---|---|
| Belgium (Ultratop 50 Flanders) | 33 |
| Ireland (IRMA) | 3 |
| Netherlands (Single Top 100) | 20 |
| UK Singles (OCC) | 8 |

== Certifications ==
| Region | Certification | Certified units/sales |
|---|---|---|
| United Kingdom (BPI) | Silver | 250,000^{^} |
^{^} Shipments figures based on certification alone.
