= Living on an Island =

Single by Status Quo

from the album Whatever You Want
- Released: 16 November 1979
- Genre: Rock
- Length: 4:48 (album version); 3:47 (single version)
- Label: Vertigo
- Songwriter: Parfitt/Young
- Producer: Pip Williams

Status Quo singles chronology
"Whatever You Want" (1979)	"Living on an Island" (1979)	"What You're Proposing" (1980)

"Living on an Island" is a single released by the British rock band Status Quo in 1979. It was included on the album Whatever You Want and featured Rick Parfitt on lead vocals.

Lyrically, the song is about band member Rick Parfitt having to take a "tax year" outside of the United Kingdom and the boredom and isolation he felt living on the Isle of Jersey; however he is also excited about a pending visit from a friend ("Cruxie") who is arriving shortly.

The themes of the song are isolation, friendship, partying and drugs, specifically cocaine. Every verse ends with the 'line' (also referenced multiple times and a further indication of the drug theme) "and we'll get high". The song reached no. 16 in the UK singles chart.

The first 100,000 copies of "Living on an Island" were issued with a picture sleeve featuring several penguins enjoying Antarctic conditions. In addition, the music video features footage of penguins interspersed with footage of the band miming the song on a soundstage.

== Track listing ==
1. "Living on an Island" (Parfitt/Young) (3.47)
2. "Runaway" (Rossi/Frost) (4.32)

== Charts ==
Weekly chart performance for "Living on an Island"
Chart (1979–80)	Peak position
Australia (Kent Music Report)	62
Germany (GfK)	38
Ireland (IRMA)	12
Spain (AFE)	28
UK Singles (OCC)	16
