= List of Status Quo members =

List of members in the English rock band Status Quo

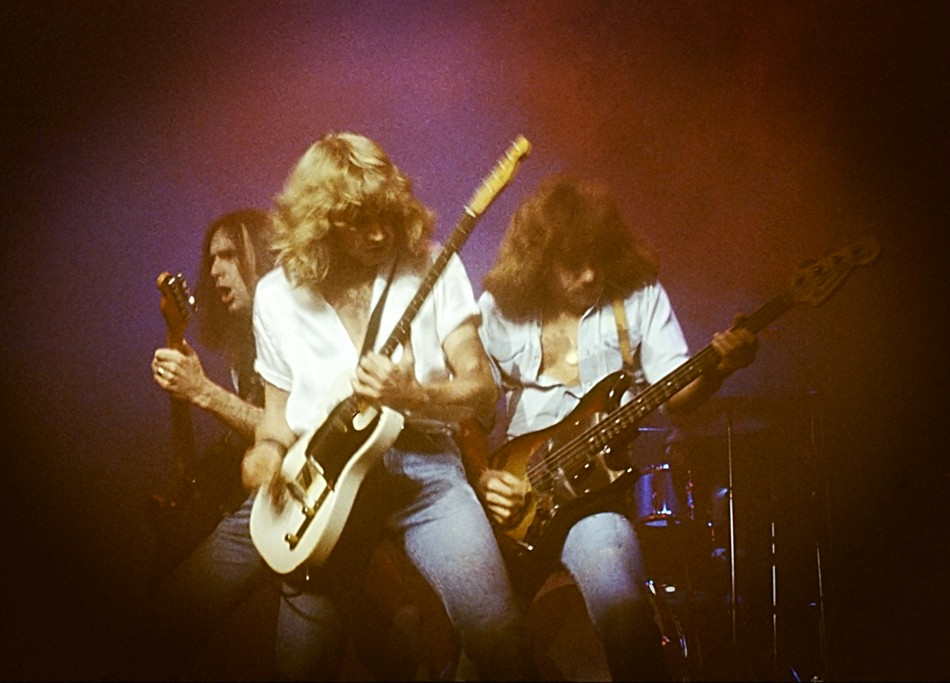
(left to right) Francis Rossi, Rick Parfitt, Alan Lancaster and John Coghlan (obscured)

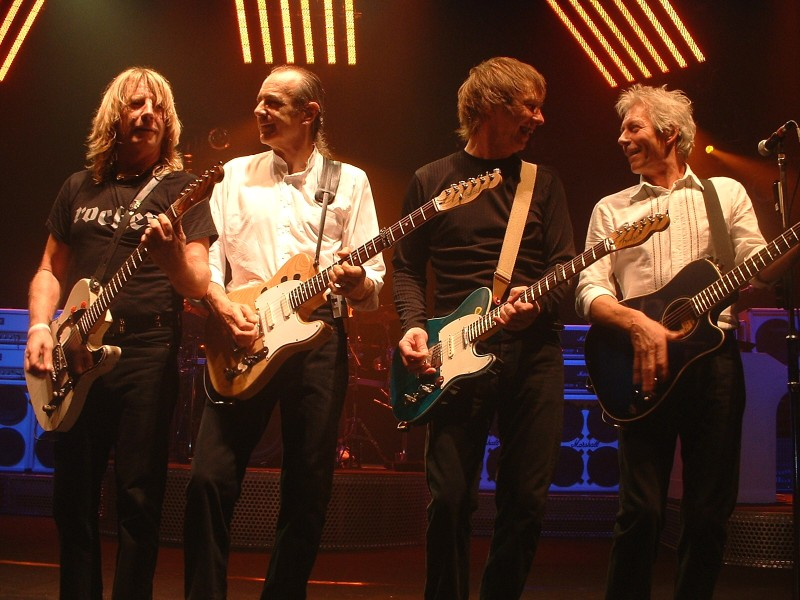
(left to right) Rick Parfitt, Matt Letley (obscured), Francis Rossi, John "Rhino" Edwards and Andy Bown

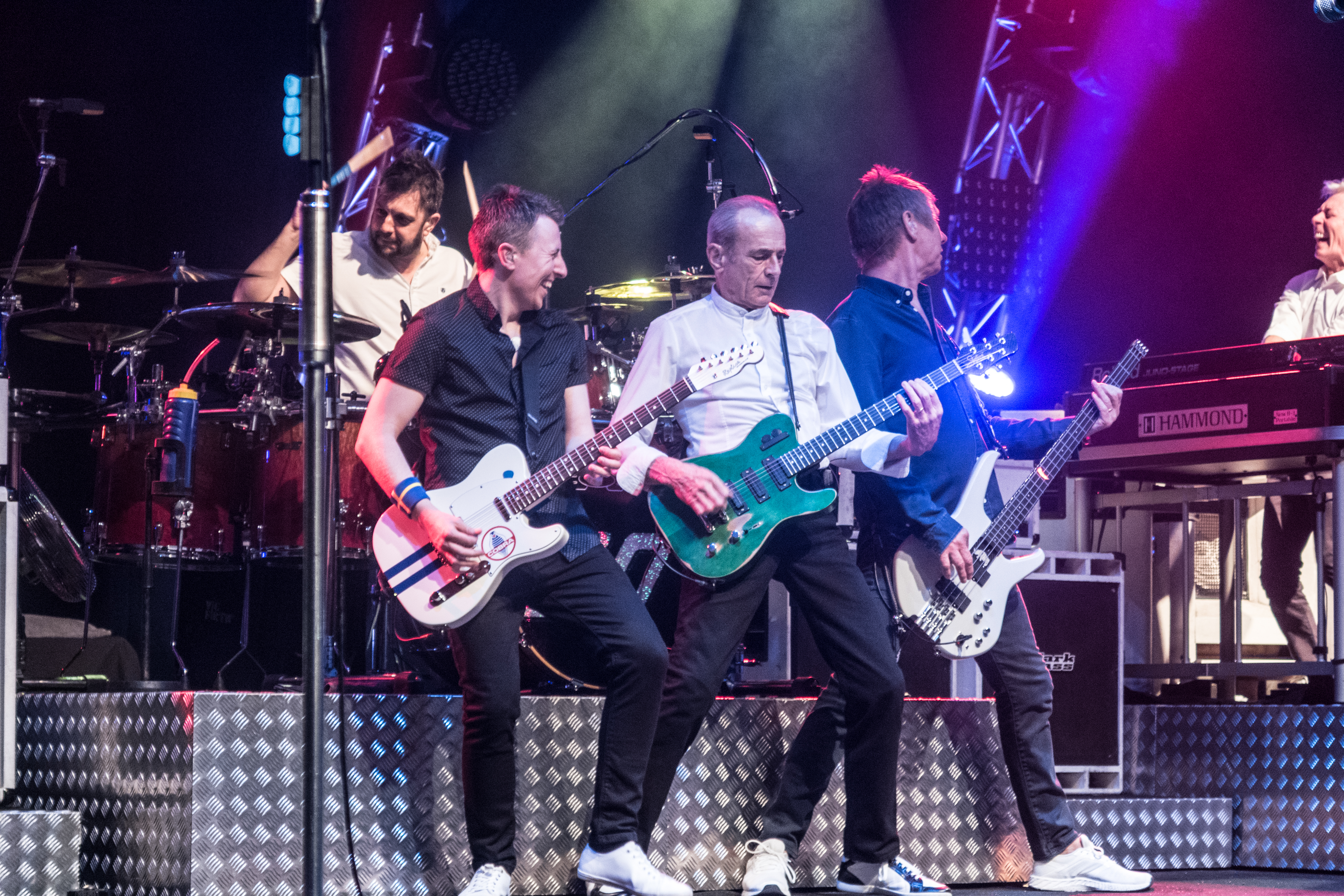
(left to right) Leon Cave, Richie Malone, Francis Rossi, John "Rhino" Edwards and Andy Bown.

Three different line-ups of Status Quo. Top: the "Frantic Four" (pictured in 1978), middle: the band's four longest-serving members (pictured in 2005), bottom: the current line-up (pictured in 2017).

Status Quo are an English rock band, formed as the Paladins in 1962 at Sedgehill Comprehensive School, Catford, by schoolboys Francis Rossi, Alan Lancaster, Jess Jaworski and Alan Key. The group has had a career spanning over 60 years; their current line-up includes consistent member Rossi, keyboardist Andy Bown (official member since 1981, previously an additional musician with the band since 1976), bassist John "Rhino" Edwards (since 1985), drummer Leon Cave (since 2013) and rhythm guitarist Richie Malone (since 2016).

== History ==
=== 1962–1970 ===
The group that became Status Quo was formed in 1962 as the Paladins. The members met while playing together in the school orchestra at Sedgehill Comprehensive School in Catford, London, and consisted of Francis Rossi on guitar and lead vocals, Alan Lancaster on bass, Jess Jaworski on keyboards and Alan Key on drums. According to Rossi, the group was Key's idea, and they practiced in Jaworski's bedroom, playing covers such as the Shadows' version of Jerry Lordan's "Apache, "Wake Up Little Susie" by the Everly Brothers and the Beatles' "Love Me Do". Key was replaced by air cadets drummer John Coghlan in 1963, although Rossi maintains that Key had left at an earlier time to get married, and was replaced by a short-lived drummer named either "Barry" or "Tony", who was ousted by the band in favour of Coghlan, whom they preferred as a drummer. Around this same time, the band changed their name to the Spectres.

At the beginning of 1965, after finishing school, Jaworski left the group to seek employment outside of the music industry. Pat Barlow, the band's manager at the time, replaced Jaworski with keyboardist Roy Lynes. While playing a stint at Butlin's Holiday Camp in Minehead in mid-1965, the band formed a friendship with guitarist Rick Parfitt, then known as Ricky Harrison, who was performing with a cabaret trio called the Highlights. In 1967, the Spectres changed their name to Traffic Jam. They initially wanted to call themselves Traffic, but were unable to due to a dispute with Steve Winwood who had also registered the name for his own group.

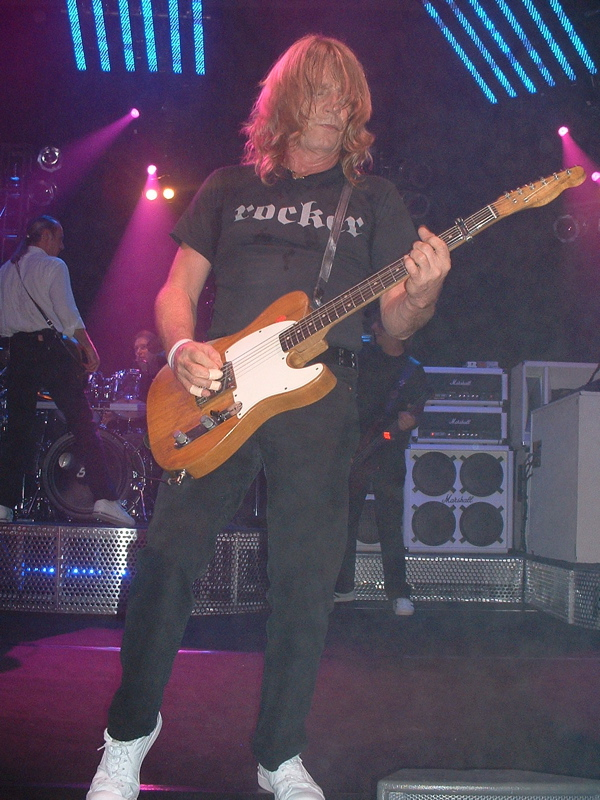
Parfitt joined the band in 1967 and stayed until his death in 2016.

Parfitt joined the band in August 1967. At this point, the group changed its name again, to Status Quo. The Rossi-Lancaster-Coghlan-Lynes-Parfitt line-up saw the group's first charting single in "Pictures of Matchstick Men" which appeared on their first album Picturesque Matchstickable Messages from the Status Quo (both 1968). This line-up released two more albums: Spare Parts (1969) and Ma Kelly's Greasy Spoon (1970), as well as the non-album single "Down the Dustpipe" (1970), which reached number 12 in the UK charts. Starting in 1969, the band's road manager and Rossi's songwriting partner Bob Young would occasionally play harmonica with the band both on stage and in the studio.

=== 1970–1981, 2013–2014: "The Frantic Four" ===
In 1970, Lynes left the band. In his 2019 autobiography, Rossi states that Lynes had decided to get married; that they were "on [their] way to a gig in Aberdeen when he jumped ship somewhere around Stoke-on-Trent". The band continued as a four-piece without a keyboardist, though they occasionally used session keyboardists in the studio, one of whom was Andy Bown, formerly of the Herd. In 1976, Bown also began playing live with the band, becoming their permanent touring/session keyboardist, though he was not made an official member during this period. Bob Young continued to occasionally play harmonica with the band until he ceased to be their road manager in 1979. He was jokingly referred to as Status Quo's "unofficial fifth member" during this era.

The four-man line-up's first release was the single "In My Chair" in late 1970, which reached number 21 in the UK, with the first album from this line-up, Dog of Two Head, following in 1971. Ten more studio albums followed, the last being 1981's Never Too Late. They also released a UK top-10 charting non-album single "The Wild Side of Life" in 1976, and a live album in 1977. This line-up is considered to be the band's "classic" line-up by many fans, having overseen the release of many of their early hits such as "Caroline", "Down Down", "Rockin' All Over the World" and "Whatever You Want". Due to its emphasis on hard rock as opposed to the psychedelic direction of the '60s and the pop rock records of the group's future, this line-up is often referred to as "the Frantic Four".

32 years after it ended, the popularity of the "Frantic Four" line-up saw Rossi, Lancaster, Coghlan and Parfitt (as well as Young on harmonica) reuniting for a series of shows in 2013 and 14, running simultaneously with the present Quo line-up at the time. Four live albums came from these tours: The Frantic Four Reunion – Live at the O2 Academy Glasgow, The Frantic Four Reunion – Live at Hammersmith Apollo, The Frantic Four Reunion – Live at Wembley Arena (all 2013) and The Frantic Four's Final Fling – Live at the Dublin O2 Arena (2014).

=== 1981–1985 ===
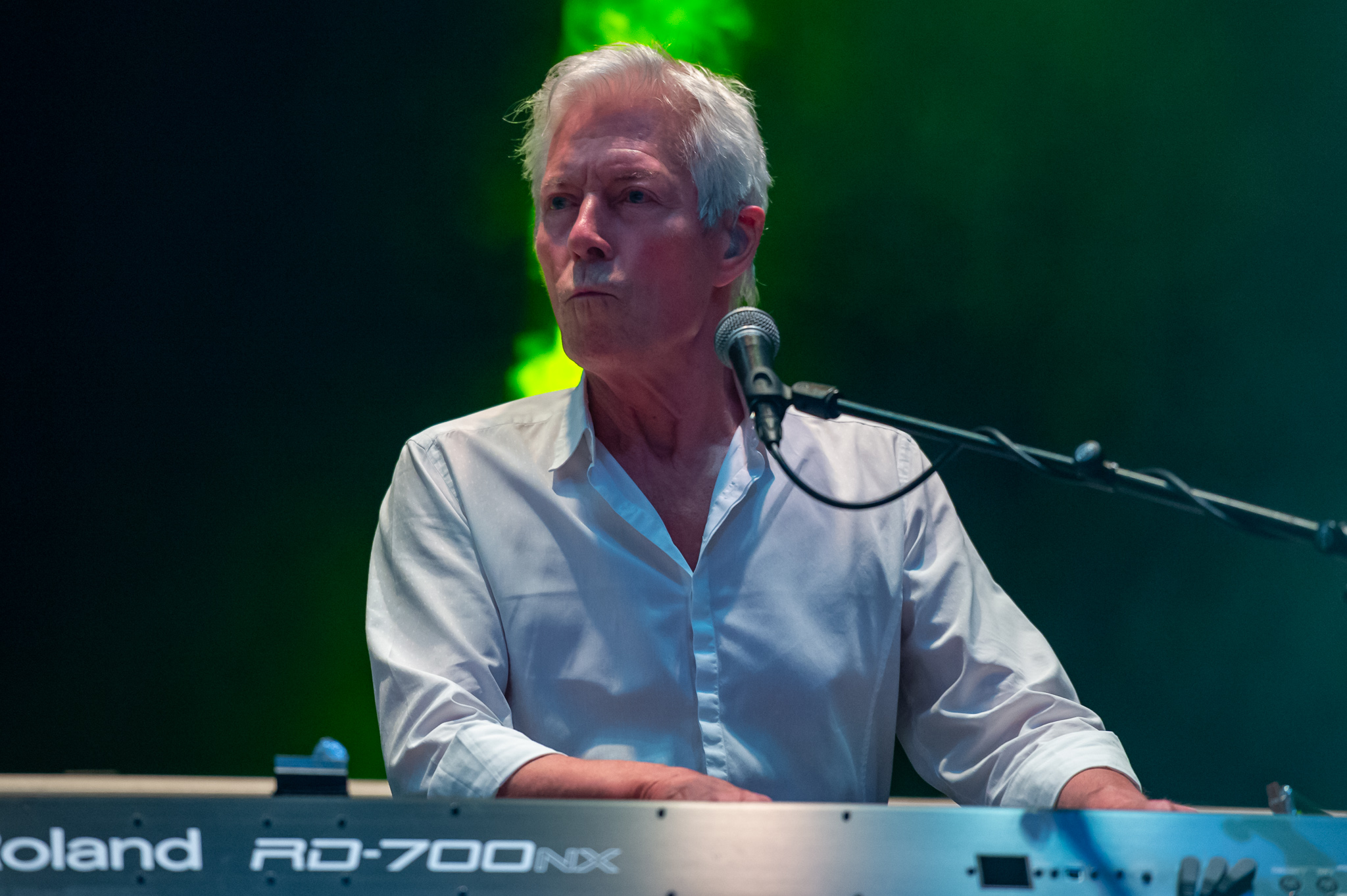
Andy Bown joined the band in 1981, having worked with them as a session/touring musician since 1976.

In 1981, Coghlan infamously quit the band after destroying his drum kit during a recording session for the 1+9+8+2 album, bringing an end to the "Frantic Four" line-up. He was replaced by Pete Kircher of Honeybus fame, while keyboardist Andy Bown was promoted to being an official member.

In 1982, this line-up completed the 1+9+8+2 album and released the live album Live at the N.E.C. (originally as part of a box set titled From the Makers of... and re-released separately in 1984), with 1983 bringing another studio album entitled Back to Back, containing the Rossi/Frost single "Marguerita Time" whose pop rock direction was a point of contention for both fans of the band and Lancaster (Lancaster stating "Nobody but Francis [Rossi] wanted to record it[...] All it did was advertise that we were a bunch of nerds."). In 1984, the single "The Wanderer" gave the band a number 7 UK chart placement, with the Rossi-Lancaster-Parfitt-Kircher-Bown line-up embarking on the "End of the Road Tour" - intended as a farewell tour due to tensions within the group. However, the group was persuaded to reformed to open Bob Geldof and Midge Ure's Live Aid concert in 1985. The success of the concert saw demand for Status Quo to reform. Due to tensions, Rossi agreed on the condition that Lancaster did not return, leading to a legal battle over the Status Quo name, which Rossi and Parfitt won. Kircher also did not return.

=== 1985–2016 ===
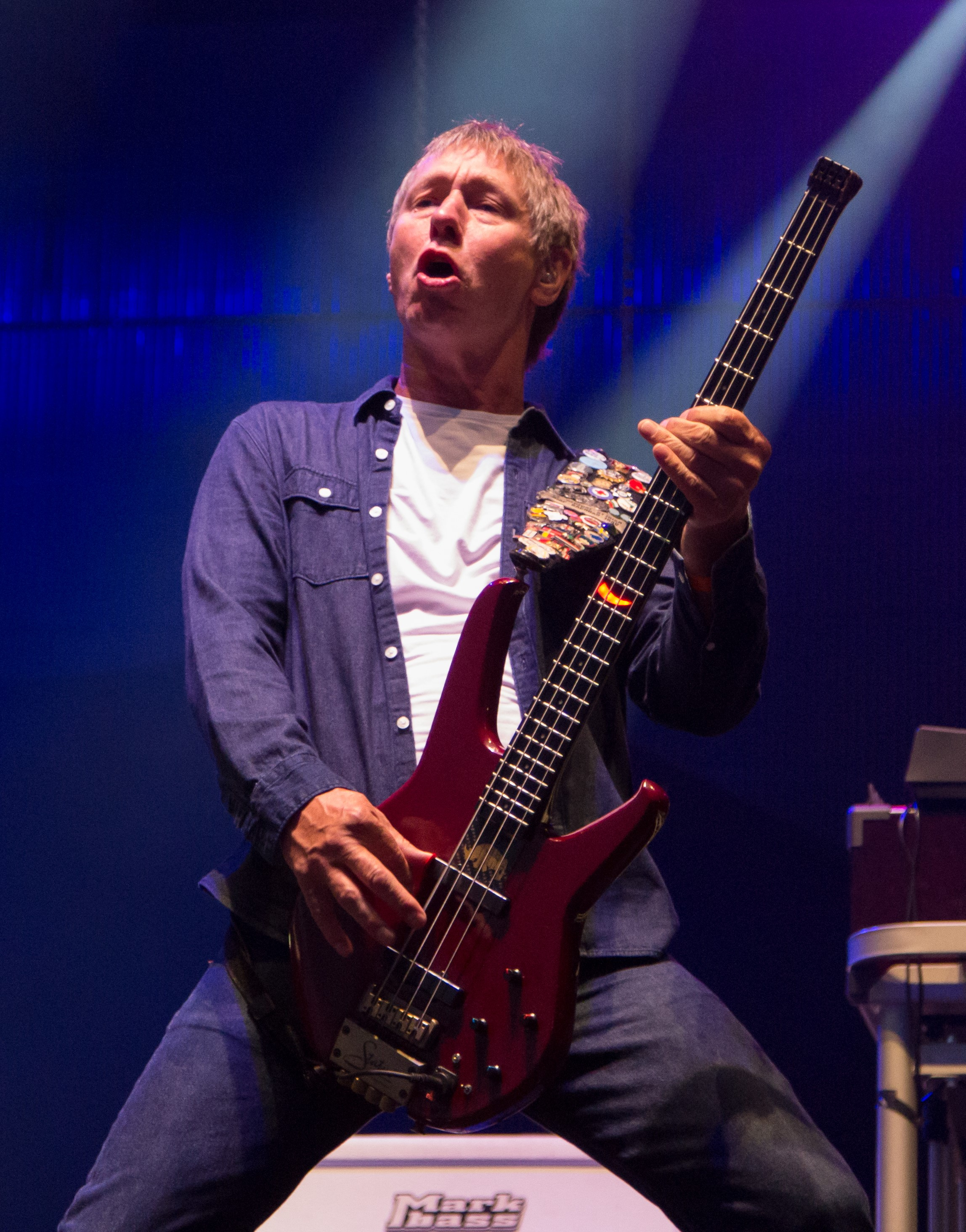
John "Rhino" Edwards replaced original bassist Alan Lancaster in 1985, and has remained with the band ever since.

Rossi, Parfitt and Bown reformed the group with bassist John "Rhino" Edwards and drummer Jeff Rich, who had both been working with Parfitt on a never-released solo album entitled Recorded Delivery. Rossi, Parfitt, Bown, Edwards and Rich would release eight studio albums together, starting with In the Army Now (1986) and ending with Famous in the Last Century (2000), as well as the live album Live Alive Quo (1992).

In April 2000, Rich retired from the group after 15 years citing family commitments, and was replaced with Matt Letley. With Letley, the group released six studio albums starting with Heavy Traffic (2002) and ending with Bula Quo! (2013), the latter being a soundtrack album for the feature film of the same name, an adventure comedy starring Rossi and Parfitt. A live album, Pictures – Live at Montreux, was also released in 2009. Letley, in turn, announced his own retirement after 13 years in 2013, and was replaced by their current drummer Leon Cave. During 2000–2001, Bown took a hiatus from the band for personal reasons, and his place was covered by Paul Hirsh of Voyager, though Bown remained an official member during this period.

With Cave, the group released their first acoustic album, Aquostic – Stripped Bare in 2014, as well as a live acoustic album, Aquostic – Live at the Roundhouse (2015). In 2016 they released a second acoustic studio album Aquostic II – That's a Fact!.

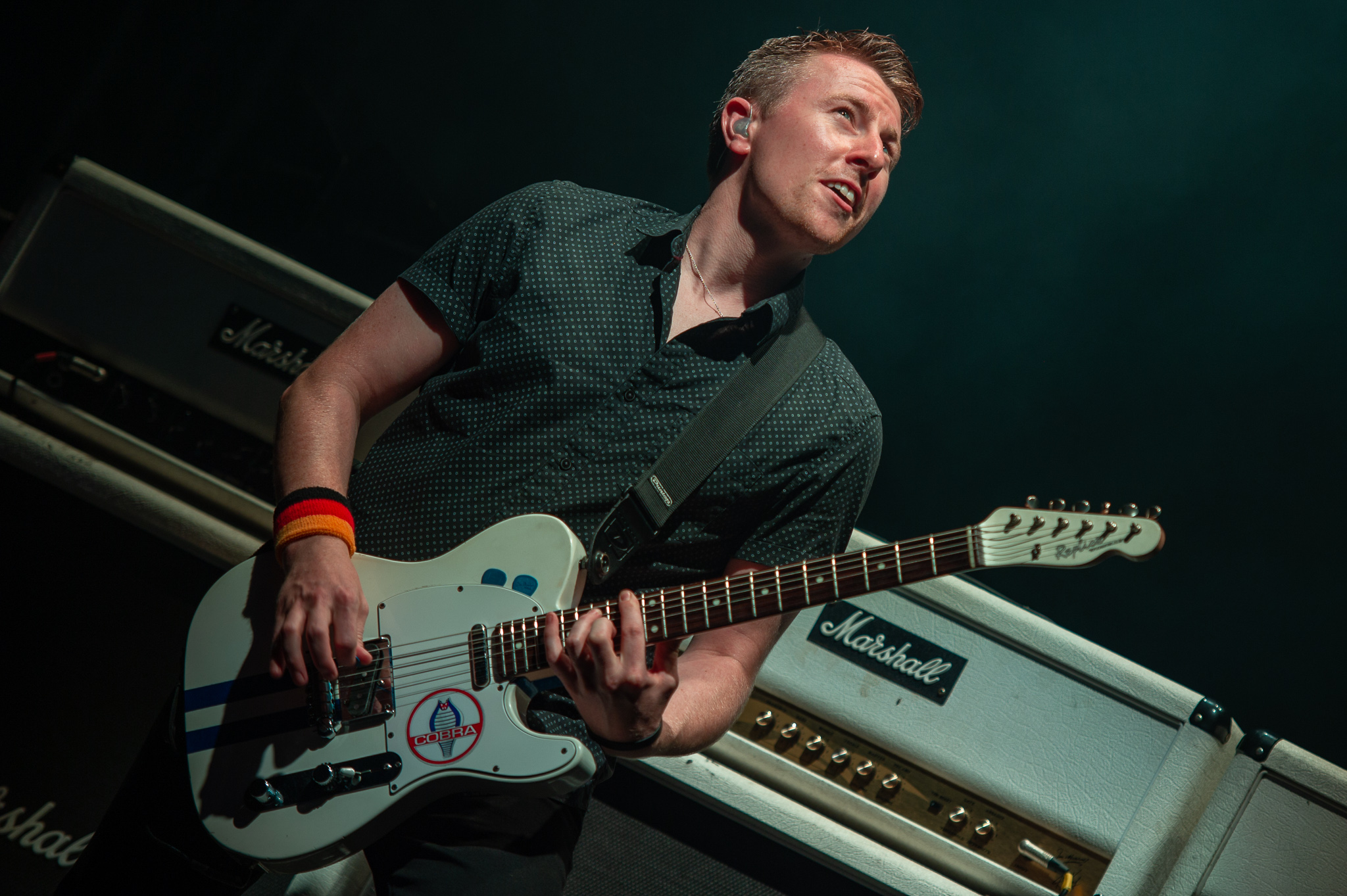
Richie Malone was a fan of the band before joining them.

After a concert in Antalya, Turkey on 14 June 2016, Parfitt suffered a heart attack and was hospitalised, and retired from touring. For the remainder of the then-ongoing "Last of the Electrics" tour, Parfitt was replaced by Edwards' son, Freddie, except for dates in July 2015 in Edinburgh and Belgium, Irish guitarist Richie Malone filled in for Parfitt. Malone was a fan of the band, and Parfitt in particular, and had met them backstage a number of times.

=== 2016–present ===
Parfitt died on 24 December 2016, bringing an end to an almost 50-year partnership between himself and Rossi. Malone was announced as Parfitt's permanent replacement on the band's website, and toured with them for the remainder of their "Last of the Electrics" tour. The Rossi-Bown-Edwards-Cave-Malone line-up has thus far released three live albums, The Last Night of the Electrics (2017), Down Down & Dignified at the Royal Albert Hall (2018) and Down Down & Dirty at Wacken (2018), and one studio album Backbone (2019).

== Members ==
=== Current members ===
Image	Name	Years active	Instruments	Release contributions
	Francis Rossi	1962–present	vocals; lead guitar	all releases
	Andy Bown	1981–present (session musician in 1973, session/touring musician 1976–1981, hiatus during 1999 and 2000–2001)	keyboards; rhythm guitar; harmonica; vocals	all releases from 1+9+8+2 (1982) onwards except the 2013–2014 "Frantic Four" reunion live albums. Previously worked as a session musician on Hello! (1973) and as a session/touring musician on all releases from Blue for You (1976) to Never Too Late (1981)
	John "Rhino" Edwards	1985–present	bass guitar; rhythm guitar; vocals	all releases from In the Army Now (1986) onwards except the 2013–2014 "Frantic Four" reunion live albums
	Leon Cave	2013–present	drums; percussion; backing vocals	all releases from Aquostic – Stripped Bare (2014) onwards
	Richie Malone	2016–present (touring substitute for Rick Parfitt during 2015)	rhythm guitar; vocals	all releases from The Last Night of the Electrics (2017) onwards

=== Former members ===
Image	Name	Years active	Instruments	Release contributions
	Alan Lancaster	1962–1985 ("Frantic Four" reunion tours in 2013 and 2014) (died 2021)	bass guitar; vocals	all releases up to Back to Back (1983) and the 2013–2014 "Frantic Four" reunion live albums
	Jess Jaworski	1962–1965 (died 2014)	keyboards; vocals	none
	Alan Key	1962–1963	drums; percussion	none
	John Coghlan	1963–1981 ("Frantic Four" reunion tours in 2013 and 2014)	drums; percussion	all releases up to Never Too Late (1981) and the 2013–2014 "Frantic Four" reunion live albums
	Roy Lynes	1965–1970	keyboards; vocals	all releases up to Ma Kelly's Greasy Spoon (1970)
	Rick Parfitt	1967–2016 (until his death) (hiatus during 2015)	rhythm guitar; keyboards; vocals	all releases up to Aquostic II – That's a Fact! (2016)
	Pete Kircher	1981–1985	drums; percussion; vocals	all releases from 1+9+8+2 (1982) to Back to Back (1983)
	Jeff Rich	1985–2000	drums; percussion	all releases from In the Army Now (1986) to Famous in the Last Century (2000)
	Matt Letley	2000–2013	drums; percussion	all releases from Heavy Traffic (2002) to Bula Quo! (2013)

=== Touring musicians ===
Image	Name	Years	Instruments	Tours, notes
	Bob Young	1969–1979; 1984; 2013–2014	harmonica	Young was the band's road manager and Rossi's songwriting partner during 1968–1979. Starting in 1969, he often joined the band on stage and in the studio, playing harmonica on certain songs. Sometimes referred to as "Status Quo's unofficial fifth member" during the "Frantic Four" era, he guested with the band at a few shows in 1984, before re-establishing his writing partnership with Rossi in 2002 and playing live with the band again during the 2013–2014 "Frantic Four" reunion tours.
	John Miles	1999	keyboards; rhythm guitar; backing vocals	Miles replaced keyboardist Andy Bown for the band's last few gigs of 1999, at the "Night of the Proms" shows in Germany.
	Paul Hirsh	2000–2001; 2017	keyboards; rhythm guitar; backing vocals	Following the passing of his wife, Bown took a break from touring during 2000–2001. Hirsh played keyboards in his place, and later played piano at the 2017 "Aquostic" acoustic concerts.
	Freddie Edwards	2014–2016	rhythm guitar	Edwards, son of the band's bassist John "Rhino" Edwards, played back-up rhythm guitar at the band's "Aquostic" acoustic concerts during 2014–2016. Along with Richie Malone, Edwards also substituted for Parfitt several times during 2015.
	Geraint Watkins	2014–2017	accordion; piano	Joined the band at "Aquostic" acoustic shows during 2014–2017
	Amy Smith	2014–2017	backing vocals	Joined the band at "Aquostic" acoustic shows during 2014–2017
	Hannah Rickard	2014–2017	backing vocals; violin	Joined the band at "Aquostic" acoustic shows during 2014–2017
	Lucy Wilkins	2014–2017	violin	Joined the band at "Aquostic" acoustic shows during 2014–2017
	Howard Gott	2014–2017	violin	Joined the band at "Aquostic" acoustic shows during 2014–2017
	Natalia Bonner	2014–2017	violin	Joined the band at "Aquostic" acoustic shows during 2014–2017
	Alison Dods	2014–2017	violin	Joined the band at "Aquostic" acoustic shows during 2014–2017
	Sophie Sirota	2014–2017	viola	Joined the band at "Aquostic" acoustic shows during 2014–2017
	Sarah Wilson	2014–2017	cello	Joined the band at "Aquostic" acoustic shows during 2014–2017
	Martin Ditcham	2014–2016	percussion	Joined the band at "Aquostic" acoustic shows during 2014–2017
	Ralf Oehmichen	2017	rhythm guitar	Joined the band at "Aquostic" acoustic shows during 2014–2017
	Chloe Gardner	2017	backing vocals	Joined the band at "Aquostic" acoustic shows during 2014–2017

== Timeline ==
Thinner lines indicate non-official member status as a guest or touring musician.

== Lineups ==
Period	Members	Releases
October 1962 – March 1963 (The Paladins)	Francis Rossi – vocals, guitar; Alan Lancaster – bass, vocals; Jess Jaworski – keyboards, vocals; Alan Key – drums	none
March 1963 – January 1965 (The Spectres)	Francis Rossi – vocals, guitar; Alan Lancaster – bass, vocals; Jess Jaworski – keyboards, vocals; John Coghlan – drums	none
January 1965 – August 1967 (The Spectres until June 1967 / Traffic Jam during June – August 1967)	Francis Rossi – vocals, guitar; Alan Lancaster – bass, vocals; John Coghlan – drums; Roy Lynes – keyboards, vocals	none
August 1967 – September 1970 (Status Quo from this point onwards)	Francis Rossi – vocals, guitar; Alan Lancaster – bass, vocals; John Coghlan – drums; Roy Lynes – keyboards, vocals; Rick Parfitt – rhythm guitar, vocals	Picturesque Matchstickable Messages from the Status Quo (1968); Spare Parts (1969); Ma Kelly's Greasy Spoon (1970)
September 1970 – February 1976	Francis Rossi – vocals, guitar; Alan Lancaster – bass, vocals; John Coghlan – drums; Rick Parfitt – rhythm guitar, vocals	Dog of Two Head (1971); Piledriver (1972); Hello! (1973); Quo (1974); On the Level (1975); Blue for You (1976)
February 1976 – December 1981	Francis Rossi – vocals, guitar; Alan Lancaster – bass, vocals; John Coghlan – drums; Rick Parfitt – rhythm guitar, vocals; Andy Bown – keyboards, vocals (touring/session)	Live! (1977); Rockin' All Over the World (1977); If You Can't Stand the Heat... (1978); Whatever You Want (1979); Just Supposin' (1980); Never Too Late (1981)
December 1981 – November 1984	Francis Rossi – vocals, guitar; Alan Lancaster – bass, vocals; Rick Parfitt – rhythm guitar, vocals; Andy Bown – keyboards, vocals (now an official member); Pete Kircher – drums	1+9+8+2 (1982); Live at the N.E.C. (1982); Back to Back (1983)
Band split November 1984
One-off performance at Live Aid on 13 July 1985	Francis Rossi – vocals, guitar; Alan Lancaster – bass, vocals; Rick Parfitt – rhythm guitar, vocals; Andy Bown – keyboards, vocals; Pete Kircher – drums	none
Band reform September 1985
September 1985 – December 1999	Francis Rossi – vocals, guitar; Rick Parfitt – rhythm guitar, vocals; Andy Bown – keyboards, vocals; John "Rhino" Edwards – bass, vocals; Jeff Rich – drums	In the Army Now (1986); Ain't Complaining (1988); Perfect Remedy (1989); Rock 'til You Drop (1991); Live Alive Quo (1992); Thirsty Work (1994); Don't Stop (1996); Under the Influence (1999)
December 1999	Francis Rossi – vocals, guitar; Rick Parfitt – rhythm guitar, vocals; John "Rhino" Edwards – bass, vocals; Jeff Rich – drums; John Miles – keyboards, vocals (substitute for Bown)	none
December 1999 – May 2000	Francis Rossi – vocals, guitar; Rick Parfitt – rhythm guitar, vocals; John "Rhino" Edwards – bass, vocals; Jeff Rich – drums; Andy Bown – keyboards, vocals	Famous in the Last Century (2000)
May 2000 – December 2001	Francis Rossi – vocals, guitar; Rick Parfitt – rhythm guitar, vocals; John "Rhino" Edwards – bass, vocals; Matt Letley – drums; Paul Hirsh – keyboards, vocals (substitute for Bown)	none
December 2001 – March 2013	Francis Rossi – vocals, guitar; Rick Parfitt – rhythm guitar, vocals; John "Rhino" Edwards – bass, vocals; Matt Letley – drums; Andy Bown – keyboards, vocals	Heavy Traffic (2002); Riffs (2003); The Party Ain't Over Yet (2005); In Search of the Fourth Chord (2007); Pictures – Live at Montreux (2009); Quid Pro Quo (2011); Bula Quo! (2013)
March 2013 ("Frantic Four" reunion tour)	Francis Rossi – vocals, guitar; Rick Parfitt – rhythm guitar, vocals; Alan Lancaster – bass, vocals; John Coghlan – drums	The Frantic Four Reunion – Live at the O2 Academy Glasgow (2013); The Frantic Four Reunion – Live at the Hammersmith Apollo (2013); The Frantic Four Reunion – Live at Wembley Arena (2013)
March 2013 – March 2014	Francis Rossi – vocals, guitar; Rick Parfitt – rhythm guitar, vocals; Andy Bown – keyboards, vocals; John "Rhino" Edwards – bass, vocals; Leon Cave – drums	none
March – April 2014 (second "Frantic Four" reunion tour)	Francis Rossi – vocals, guitar; Rick Parfitt – rhythm guitar, vocals; Alan Lancaster – bass, vocals; John Coghlan – drums	The Frantic Four's Final Fling – Live at the Dublin O2 Arena (2014)
April 2014 – June 2015	Francis Rossi – vocals, guitar; Rick Parfitt – rhythm guitar, vocals; Andy Bown – keyboards, vocals; John "Rhino" Edwards – bass, vocals; Leon Cave – drums	Aquostic – Stripped Bare (2014); Aquostic – Live at the Roundhouse (2015)
June – July 2015	Francis Rossi – vocals, guitar; Andy Bown – keyboards, vocals; John "Rhino" Edwards – bass, vocals; Leon Cave – drums; Freddie Edwards – rhythm guitar, vocals (substitute for Parfitt)	none
July 2015	Francis Rossi – vocals, guitar; Andy Bown – keyboards, vocals; John "Rhino" Edwards – bass, vocals; Leon Cave – drums; Richie Malone – rhythm guitar, vocals (substitute for Parfitt)	none
July – August 2015	Francis Rossi – vocals, guitar; Andy Bown – keyboards, vocals; John "Rhino" Edwards – bass, vocals; Leon Cave – drums; Freddie Edwards – rhythm guitar, vocals (substitute for Parfitt)	none
August 2015	Francis Rossi – vocals, guitar; Andy Bown – keyboards, vocals; John "Rhino" Edwards – bass, vocals; Leon Cave – drums; Richie Malone – rhythm guitar, vocals (substitute for Parfitt)	none
August 2015 – October 2016	Francis Rossi – vocals, guitar; Andy Bown – keyboards, vocals; John "Rhino" Edwards – bass, vocals; Leon Cave – drums; Rick Parfitt – rhythm guitar, vocals	Aquostic II – That's a Fact! (2016)
October 2016 – present	Francis Rossi – vocals, guitar; Andy Bown – keyboards, vocals; John "Rhino" Edwards – bass, vocals; Leon Cave – drums; Richie Malone – rhythm guitar, vocals (initially substitute for Parfitt; official member after Parfitt's death on 24 December 2016)	The Last Night of the Electrics (2017); Down Down & Dignified at the Royal Albert Hall (2018); Down Down & Dirty at Wacken (2018); Backbone (2019)
