= Rocking All Over the Years =

Greatest hits album by Status Quo
- Released: 8 October 1990
- Genre: Rock
- Label: Vertigo

Status Quo chronology
Perfect Remedy (1989)	Rocking All Over the Years (1990)	Rock 'til You Drop (1991)

Rocking All Over the Years is a compilation album by the British rock band Status Quo. The album contains all Quo's UK top 10 singles, including the new "Anniversary Waltz (Part One)", a medley of classic rock and roll songs to celebrate the 25th anniversary of band members Francis Rossi and Rick Parfitt first meeting each other. A second rock and roll medley, "Anniversary Waltz (Part Two)", was issued as a single later in 1990.

== Track listing ==
1. "Pictures of Matchstick Men" (Rossi) from Picturesque Matchstickable Messages from the Status Quo – 3:08
2. "Ice in the Sun" (Wilde) from Picturesque Matchstickable Messages from the Status Quo – 2:01
3. "Paper Plane" (Rossi/Young) from Piledriver – 2:53
4. "Caroline" (Rossi/Young) from Hello! – 3:40
5. "Break the Rules" (Rossi/Young/Parfitt/Lancaster/Coghlan) from Quo – 3:37
6. "Down Down" (Rossi/Young) from On the Level – 3:45
7. "Roll Over Lay Down" (Rossi/Young/Parfitt/Lancaster/Coghlan) – 4:41
8. "Rain" (Parfitt) from Blue for You – 4:25
9. "Wild Side of Life" (Warren/Carter) Single release only – 3:13
10. "Rockin' All Over the World" (Fogerty) from Rockin' All Over the World – 3:25
11. "Whatever You Want" (Parfitt/Bown) from Whatever You Want – 3:49
12. "What You're Proposing" (Rossi/Frost) from Just Supposin' – 3:50
13. "Something 'Bout You Baby I Like" (Supa) from Never Too Late – 2:38
14. "Rock 'n' Roll" (Rossi/Frost) from Just Supposin' – 3:50
15. "Dear John" (Gustafson/MacCauley) from 1+9+8+2 – 3:12
16. "Ol' Rag Blues" (Lancaster/Lamb) from Back to Back – 2:48
17. "Marguerita Time" (Rossi/Frost) from Back to Back – 3:19
18. "The Wanderer" (Maresca) Single release only – 3:19
19. "Rollin' Home" (David) from In the Army Now – 3:58
20. "In the Army Now" (Bolland/Bolland) from In the Army Now – 3:39
21. "Burning Bridges" (Rossi/Bown) from Ain't Complaining – 3:51
22. "Anniversary Waltz (Part One)" (Lee/Kind/Mack/Mendlesohn/Berry/Maresca/Bartholomew/King/Collins/Penniman/Hammer/Blackwell) new track – 5:00

== Charts ==
Chart (1990–91)	Peak position
Australian Albums (Kent Music Report)	10
Austrian Albums (Ö3 Austria)	14
Dutch Albums (Album Top 100)	20
German Albums (Offizielle Top 100)	46
Norwegian Albums (VG-lista)	21
Spanish Albums (AFYVE)	5
Swedish Albums (Sverigetopplistan)	20
Swiss Albums (Schweizer Hitparade)	12
UK Albums (OCC)	2

== Certifications ==
Region	Certification	Certified units/sales
Australia (ARIA)	4× Platinum	280,000^{^}
Denmark (IFPI Danmark)	Platinum	80,000^{^}
Spain (PROMUSICAE)	Platinum	100,000^{^}
Sweden (GLF)	Gold	50,000^{^}
Switzerland (IFPI Switzerland)	Gold	25,000^{^}
United Kingdom (BPI)	2× Platinum	600,000^{^}
^{^} Shipments figures based on certification alone.
