= Backbone (Status Quo album) =

Studio album by Status Quo
- Released: 6 September 2019
- Recorded: 2018–2019
- Studio: ARSIS Studios
- Genre: Rock
- Length: 40:54
- Label: earMusic; Fourth Chord Records
- Producer: Francis Rossi

Status Quo chronology
Down Down & Dirty at Wacken (2018)	Backbone (2019)

Singles from Backbone
- 1. "Backbone" Released: 12 July 2019; 2. "Liberty Lane" Released: 9 August 2019

Professional ratings
Review scores
Source	Rating
Classic Rock	8/10 stars

Backbone is the thirty-third studio album by British rock band Status Quo. It was released on 6 September 2019 and debuted at number six on the UK Albums Chart (and at top spot on the Album Sales Chart, which subtracts streaming activity from specific album purchases in all digital and physical formats). It was the band's 25th UK top ten album and their highest-charting album of original material (Note: Between 1+9+8+2 and Backbone, the band had three higher-charting, top-five albums: two studio albums and a greatest hits compilation. These are Rocking All Over the Years (1990; compilation), Don't Stop (1996; covers of other artists), and Aquostic – Stripped Bare (2014; acoustic covers of their own songs). Rocking All Over the Years contained "Anniversary Waltz", which was a previously unreleased medley of rock-and-roll genre covers, but none of the three albums contained any wholly new compositions.) since 1+9+8+2 (1982). Backbone also entered the Swiss album charts at number two, and the German album charts at number six, giving the band their highest album chart position in the latter, despite a long history of enduring popularity.

Frontman Francis Rossi stated in a 2022 interview with Classic Rock magazine that Backbone was likely to be Status Quo's final studio album. Rossi blamed the shift to streaming as the predominant means of consuming music and called out Spotify in particular: "It’s something we’ve sweated over and they’re giving you a quarter of a penny per stream? Fuck you." He described the situation in the industry as "even worse than when we were all getting ripped off in the sixties". However, he did not write off the possibility entirely and made it clear that the band still has "one in us".

== Background ==
Backbone is the first album released by the band since the death of rhythm guitarist Rick Parfitt, who had featured on every prior Status Quo album. Speaking about the album in a press release, frontman Francis Rossi expressed both pride in the content and sadness regarding Parfitt's lack of involvement, saying "This new material had to be seriously good. Quo have achieved so much and meant so much to too many people for the quality to slip now [...] Losing Rick was hard to bear but, through Richie Malone, who was inspired to pick up a guitar by him, we can not only keep going but actually pick up the pace." He concluded: "I wasn't sure I had another album in me but I couldn't be more proud of Backbone." The album was dedicated to Rick Parfitt: "This album is dedicated to the memory of Rick Parfitt OBE (1948–2016)".

The title track was released on 12 July 2019 as the first single, with a promo video. The second single, "Liberty Lane", was released on 9 August 2019 and a video for the single was later released in September. The band had started playing "Liberty Lane" and "Cut Me Some Slack" live a month before the album was announced, generating excitement for the new release, which is notable for being one of the few times the band have toured new music before release.

== Track listing ==
No.	Title	Writer(s)	Length
1.	"Waiting for a Woman"	Francis Rossi; Robert Keith Young	4:28
2.	"Cut Me Some Slack"	Rossi; John "Rhino" Edwards	3:42
3.	"Liberty Lane"	Rossi; Edwards	3:28
4.	"I See You're in Some Trouble"	Rossi; Young	3:47
5.	"Backing Off"	Andy Bown; Rossi	4:12
6.	"I Wanna Run Away with You"	Rossi; Young	3:23
7.	"Backbone"	Rossi; Edwards	3:03
8.	"Better Take Care"	John David	3:34
9.	"Falling Off the World"	Leon Cave	3:29
10.	"Get Out of My Head"	Richie Malone	3:24
11.	"Running Out of Time"	Bown; Rossi	3:29

Digipak bonus tracks
No.	Title	Writer(s)	Length
12.	"Crazy Crazy"	Rossi; Bown	3:18
13.	"Face the Music"	Malone	3:27

== Personnel ==
Status Quo

- Francis Rossi – lead guitar, vocals
- Richie Malone – rhythm guitar, vocals
- John "Rhino" Edwards – basses, guitars, vocals
- Andy Bown – keyboards, guitar, vocals
- Leon Cave – drums and percussion

Production

- Francis Rossi – producer, mixing
- Andy Brook – engineer, recording, mixing and mastering

== Charts ==
Chart (2019)	Peak position
Australian Albums (ARIA)	98
Austrian Albums (Ö3 Austria)	23
Belgian Albums (Ultratop Flanders)	31
Belgian Albums (Ultratop Wallonia)	21
Dutch Albums (Album Top 100)	28
French Albums (SNEP)	114
German Albums (Offizielle Top 100)	6
Irish Albums (IRMA)	76
Scottish Albums (OCC)	1
Spanish Albums (Promusicae)	43
Swedish Albums (Sverigetopplistan)	31
Swiss Albums (Schweizer Hitparade)	2
UK Albums (OCC)	6
UK Independent Albums (OCC)	1
