= Roadhouse Medley =

Single by Status Quo

from the album Live Alive Quo
- Released: 28 September 1992
- Recorded: BBC
- Genre: Rock
- Length: 4:40
- Label: Polydor Records
- Songwriter: See text for full details

Status Quo singles chronology
"Rock 'til You Drop" (1992)	"Roadhouse Medley" (1992)	"Come on You Reds" (1994)

"Roadhouse Medley (Anniversary Waltz Part 25)" is a single released by the British rock band Status Quo in 1992. It was included on their third live album, Live Alive Quo (1992).

"Roadhouse Medley" was recorded live at BBC Radio One's Party in the Park, at Sutton Park in Birmingham on 30 August 1992. All versions of the medley, including the full 13:27 version, are unavailable elsewhere.

The origins of this track date back to the early 1970s, when Status Quo heard the Doors track "Roadhouse Blues" in a club and adopted its chugging rhythm as a template for much of their early self-penned material. "Roadhouse Blues" itself had been recorded by Quo in 1972 on the Piledriver album and, with vocals by bassist Alan Lancaster, was a staple of the band's live set for many years. By 1976's Status Quo Live! album the song had been extended to more than twelve minutes in duration, featuring a lengthy middle section in which parts of a traditional Irish jig, "Irish Washer Woman" were played.

Status Quo played "Roadhouse Blues" only sporadically following Lancaster's departure from the band in 1985, with Rick Parfitt assuming lead vocals. The "jig" section started to extend again some time between the band's Knebworth Festival appearance in June 1990 and their concert at Butlin's in Minehead in October of the same year, taking in a medley of other Status Quo songs in a shortened form, before returning to "Roadhouse Blues". For the radio edit of "Roadhouse Medley" the Doors section was dropped altogether.

The songs comprising the "Roadhouse Medley" have since been restored to full length in the band's live sets, and although "Roadhouse Blues" has not been played by the classic band for many years, it was played during the critically acclaimed "Frantic Four" reunion shows in 2013 and 2014.

== Track listing ==
- 7 inch/Cassette
1. "Roadhouse Medley" (Anniversary Waltz Part 25) (Radio Edit) (features: "The Wanderer" (Maresca), "Marguerita Time" (Rossi/Frost), "Living on an Island" (Parfitt/ Young), "Break the Rules" (Rossi/Young/Parfitt/Lancaster/Coghlan), "Something 'Bout You Baby (I Like)" (Supa) (4:40)
2. "Roadhouse Medley" (Extended Version) "The Wanderer" (Maresca), "Marguerita Time" (Rossi/Frost), "Living on an Island" (Parfitt/ Young), "Break the Rules" (Rossi/Young/Parfitt/Lancaster/Coghlan), "Something 'Bout You Baby (I Like)" (Supa), "The Price of Love" (Everly), "Roadhouse Blues" (Morrison/Doors) (7:34)
- CD1
1. "Roadhouse Medley" (Anniversary Waltz Part 25) (Radio Edit) (4:40)
2. "Roadhouse Medley" (Extended Version) (7:34)
3. "Don't Drive My Car" (Live)
- CD2
1. "Roadhouse Medley" (Anniversary Waltz Part 25) (Radio Edit) (4:40)
2. "Roadhouse Medley" (Roadhouse Mix) (13:27)

== Charts ==
Chart (1992)	Peak position
Ireland (IRMA)	27
UK Singles (OCC)	21
UK Airplay (Music Week)	29
