= Rolf Harris discography =

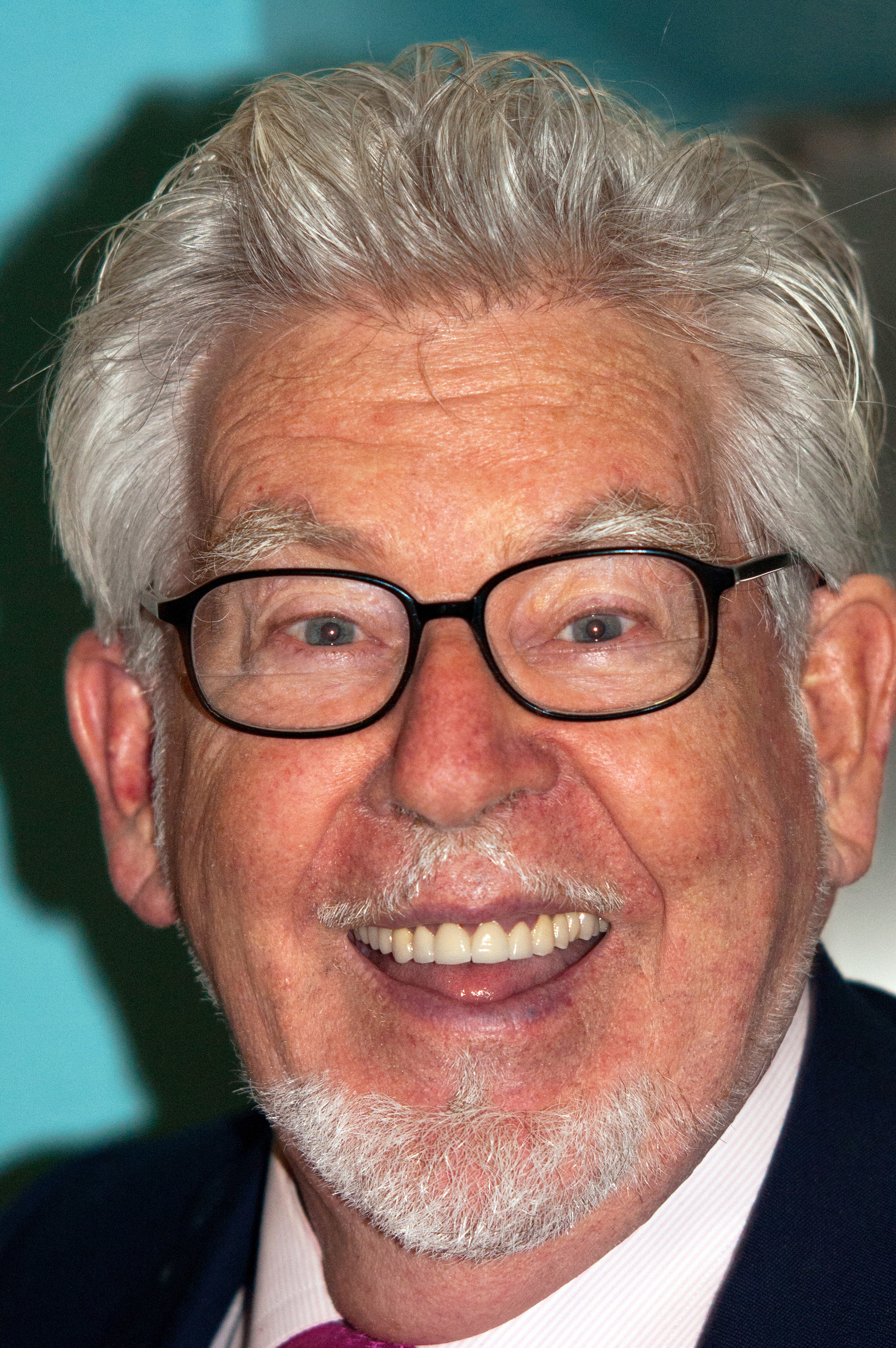
- Studio albums: 30
- Live albums: 2
- Compilation albums: 4
- Singles: 48

The discography of Australian musician, singer-songwriter, painter and television personality Rolf Harris consists of 30 studio albums, 2 live albums, 4 compilation albums, and 48 singles. He often used unusual instruments in his performances: he played the didgeridoo and the stylophone and is credited with the invention of the wobble board. Harris also collaborated with other artists, including Kate Bush, Rick Parfitt, and The Wiggles.

Harris began his career in music in the 1950s, releasing several songs including "Tie Me Kangaroo Down, Sport" (a Top 10 hit in Australia, the UK, and the US), "Sun Arise", "Jake the Peg", and his recording of "Two Little Boys" (which reached number 1 in the UK). In 1993, Harris did a cover of the Led Zeppelin song "Stairway to Heaven", featuring didgeridoo and wobble board. His last song was the 2009 Christmas song "Christmas in the Sun". Harris was convicted in England in 2014 of the sexual assault of four underage girls.

In 1960, Harris' single "Tie Me Kangaroo Down, Sport" reached number 1 in Australia, and in 1969 "Two Little Boys" reached number 1 on both the Irish and UK charts. Harris is credited with inventing a simple homemade instrument called the wobble board. As well as his beatboxing, similar to eefing, Harris went on to use an array of unusual instruments in his music, including the didgeridoo (the sound of which was imitated on "Sun Arise" by four double basses), the Jew's harp and, later, the stylophone (for which he also lent his name and likeness for advertising).

== Albums ==
=== Studio albums ===
Year	Title	Notes
1959	Rolf Harris Sings at the Down Under Club: Label: Queensway	
1963	Sun Arise: Label: Epic	
1963	The Original Sun Arise: Label: Epic	
1964	The Court of King Caractacus: Label: Epic	The single reached No 9 on the Australian Singles Chart.
1965	All Together Now: Label: MFP	
1966	To My Darling Ronza: Label: Epic	
1966	Man with the Microphone: Label: Columbia	
1966	Shamus O'Sean the Leprechaun: Label: MFP	
1968	It's a Rolf World: Label: Capitol	
1968	The Rolf Harris Show: Label: Columbia	
1970	Mary's Boy Child: Label: Columbia	
1971	Instant Music: Label: Columbia	
1971	Jake the Peg in Vancouver Town: Label: Capitol	Reached No. 61 on the Canadian Albums Chart
1972	The Boy from Bassendean: Label: Rolf Harris Enterprises	
1973	In Many Moods: Label: Columbia	
1973	You Name It: Label: Capitol	Canadian release
1975	She'll Be Right: Label: Festival, EMI	Reissued in circa 1999
1976	Mirrored Image: Label: EMI	
1976	Turn On: Label: Capitol Records	Canadian release
1979	Rolf on Saturday OK?: Label: BBC	
1987	Cartoon Time Favourites: Label:	
1991	Ideal: Label: EMI	
1992	Rolf Rules OK!: Label: Polygram Music / Australian Broadcasting Corporation	Nominated for Best Comedy Release at the ARIA Awards in 1994; Reached No. 67 on the ARIA Albums Chart
1996	Animal Magic: Label: EMI	
1997	Can You Tell What It Is Yet?: Label: EMI	No. 70 on the UK Albums Chart in November 1997
1999	Bootleg: Label: Rolf Harris Enterprises	
2000	70/30: Label: Rolf Harris Enterprises	
2001	King Rolf: Label: Disky	
2004	Now and Then – The New and the Vintage: Label: Rolf Harris Enterprises	
2006	A Portrait in Song: Label: ABC Music	As 'Rolf Harris and Friends'

=== Live albums ===
Year	Title
1966	At the Cave, Vancouver (live): Label: Capitol
1969	Rolf Harris Live! At the Talk of the Town: Label: Columbia

=== Compilation albums ===
Year	Title	Notes
1994	The Definitive Rolf Harris: Label: EMI	
2000	The Best of Rolf Harris: Label: EMI	
2006	Songs for Kids: Label: ABC for Kids, Roadshow	Featured "Tie Me Kangaroo Down, Sport" with The Wiggles
2008	The Platinum Collection: Label: EMI Gold	

== Singles ==
Date	Title	UK Catalogue No.
21 July 1960	"Tie Me Kangaroo Down, Sport" / "Nick Teen and Al K. Hall"	Columbia 45-DB 4483
1961	"Tame Eagle" / "Uncomfortable Yogi"	Columbia 45-DB 4556
1961	"Six White Boomers" / "I've Lost My Mummy"	Columbia 45-DB 4740
25 October 1962	"Sun Arise" / "Someone's Pinched My Winkles"	Columbia 45-DB 4888
28 February 1963	"Johnny Day" / "In the Wet"	Columbia 45-DB 4979
1963	"I Know A Man" / "Living It Up"	Columbia DB 7064
1964	"Ringo for President" / "Head Hunter"	Columbia DB 7349
1964	"The Court of King Caractacus" / "The Five Young Apprentices"	Columbia DB 7450
1965	"Iko Iko" / "Sydney Town"	Columbia DB 7554
1965	"War Canoe" / "Linda"	Columbia DB 7669
1965	"Jake the Peg" / "Big Dog"	Columbia DB 7803
1966	"Hev Yew Gotta Loight, Boy?" / "Animals Pop Party"	Columbia DB 8014
1967	"Fijian Girl" / "You Got What It Takes"	Columbia DB 8168
1967	"If I Was a Richman" / "Borroloola"	Columbia DB 8191
1967	"I've Never Seen Anything Like It" / "Willy, Willy"	Columbia DB 8285
1967	"Pukka Chicken" / "Here Come the Bees (Love Has Gone)"	Columbia DB 8314
1968	"Hurry Home" / "Paris with You"	Columbia DB 8349
13 September 1968	"The Bloke That Invented Beer" / "Have a Beer"	Columbia DB 8475
16 April 1969	"Bluer Than Blue" / "The Monster"	Columbia DB 8553
1969	"Jag är Sven Gren (Med Ett Extra Ben)" / "Släpp Min Känguru Ut, Rut!"	Columbia DB 2457
22 November 1969	"Two Little Boys" / "I Love My Love"	Columbia DB 8630
1970	"Tennessee Birdwalk" / "Ned Kelly"	Columbia DB 8700
1970	"Mary's Boy Child" / "Christmas Is Here"	Columbia DB 8730
1971	"Take Back the Things (That We Said)" / "Salvation Army Citadel"	Columbia DB 8762
1971	"Vancouver Town '71" /	Capitol 72645-F
1971	"A Ram Sam Sam" / "Go Back Home"	Columbia DB 8838
1972	"So Earlye in the Evenin'" / "Watch Your Step"	Columbia DB 8876
1972	"She'll Be Right" / "Jindabyne"	Columbia DB 8961
1972	"Tutankamun" / "A Friend Like Me"	Columbia DB 8905
1974	"Papillon" / "Relax With Rolf"	EMI 2154
1974	"Little Pal" / "Lazy Day"	EMI 2238
4 April 1975	"Presbyterian Church" / "Black Midnight Swamp"	EMI 2286
1975	"Happy Birthday, Father Christmas" / "MacAdam"	EMI 2380
1976	"Yarrabangee" / "Yarrabangee" (Inst.)	EMI 2462
1978	"Back To W.A." / "Old Man Emu"	Interfusion K7322
1979	"Stuck to the Ice" / "The Gendarmes' Duet" (With Crom Harris)	Columbia DB 9069
1981	"Hey Jimmy Johnson" / "Ginger Tom"	Rolf Harris Enterprides RHE 1
1981	"War Canoe" / "Linda" (Re-Issue)	EMI 5244
1982	"The Dreaming" / "Dreamtime" (Kate Bush, both tracks feature Rolf on didgeridoo)	EMI 5296
1985	"Tommy (From 88 Pine)" / "Pavlova"	Tembo Records TML 111
1987	"Heigh Ho/Whistle While You Work" / "Zip-A-Dee-Doo-Dah"	BBC Records and Tapes REH642
1991	"Stylophonia" / "Stylophonia" (Land of Aus Instru-Mental) (Two Little Boys, featuring sampled Rolf Harris vocal. Rolf performed and promoted the song on T.V.)	T.A. Scam Recordings MFD 005
1991	"Sun Arise" / "Two Little Boys" (Re-Issue)	EMI EM 210
1992	"Stylophonia" ('92 Vocal Re-edit)/ "Stylophonia" (Two Little Boys, featuring sampled Rolf Harris vocal. Rolf performed and promoted the song on T.V.)	T.A. Scam Recordings MFD 005
13 February 1993	"Stairway to Heaven" / "Stairway to Heaven" (By The Australian Doors)	Vertigo VER 73
12 December 1995	"Ego Sum Pauper" / "Ego Sum Pauper" (Rolfamix) / "Old Shep"	Rolf Harris Enterprises CD RHE 9
1 June 1996	"Bohemian Rhapsody" / "This Is a Didgeridoo"	Living Beat LBECD 41
25 October 1997	"Sun Arise" / "Sun Arise" (808 State Remix)	EMI CDROO 001
14 October 2000	"Fine Day" / "Fine Day" (Remix)	Tommy Boy TBCD 2155
7 December 2009	"Christmas in the Sun" with Rick Parfitt	

=== Charting singles ===
Year	Title	Chart positions					
Year	Title	AUS	CAN	IRE	NZ	UK	US
1960	"Tie Me Kangaroo Down, Sport"	1	—	—	—	9	3*
1960	"Nick Teen and Al K. Hall" (B-side of "Tie Me Kangaroo Down, Sport")	—	—	—	—	—	95
1960	"The Big Black Hat"	42	—	—	—	—	—
1960	"Six White Boomers"	12	—	—	—	—	—
1961	"Sun Arise"	61	—	—	—	3	61
1961	"Tie Me Kangaroo Down Cha Cha" (Australian B-side of "Sun Arise")	flip	—	—	—	—	—
1963	"Johnny Day"	—	—	—	—	44	—
1964	"The Court of King Caractacus"	32	—	—	—	—	116
1964	"Ringo for President"	85	—	—	—	—	—
1965	"Sydney Town"	53	—	—	—	—	—
1966	"Jake the Peg"	23	—	—	—	53 (Note: Chart position is from the official UK "Breakers List".)	—
1966	"Big Dog" (B-side of "Jake the Peg")	flip	—	—	—	—	—
1966	"Hey Yew Gotta Loight, Boy?" (Allan Smethurst)	88	—	—	—	54	—
1968	"Hurry Home"	58	—	—	—	—	—
1969	"Bluer Than Blue"	—	—	—	—	30	—
1969	"Two Little Boys"	7	—	1	—	1	119
1971	"Vancouver Town '71"	—	68	—	—	—	—
1971	"Salvation Army Citadel"	67	—	—	—	—	—
1979	"Back to W.A."	66	—	—	—	—	—
1982	"The Dreaming" (Kate Bush, features Rolf on didgeridoo)	91	—	—	—	48	—
1993	"Stairway to Heaven"	73	—	10	22	7	—
1995	"Ego Sum Pauper"	—	—	—	—	83	—
1996	"Bohemian Rhapsody"	—	—	—	—	50	—
1997	"Sun Arise" (Re-Recording)	—	—	—	—	26	—
2000	"Fine Day"	—	—	—	—	24	—

- "Tie Me Kangaroo Down, Sport" charted in 1963 was a U.S. re-recording
