= Little Dreamer =

Little Dreamer may refer to:

- Little Dreamer (Peter Green album), 1980
- Little Dreamer (Beth Rowley album)
- Little Dreamer (Negazione album)
- "Little Dreamer" (song), a 1989 song by Status Quo
- "Little Dreamer", from Christina Aguilera's album Bionic
- "Little Dreamer", from Van Halen's album Van Halen
