= Over and Out (Rick Parfitt album) =

Studio album by Rick Parfitt
- Released: 23 March 2018
- Recorded: 2015–2016
- Genre: Hard rock
- Length: 33:44
- Label: Ear Music
- Producer: Jo Webb

Rick Parfitt chronology
Christmas in the Sun (2009)	Over and Out (2018)

Over and Out is a 2018 studio album by Status Quo guitarist and vocalist Rick Parfitt. Parfitt died on 24 December 2016, and the album, his first and only solo album, was completed and released posthumously on 23 March 2018. The album includes contributions from a number of guest musicians, including current and former Status Quo bassists John "Rhino" Edwards and Alan Lancaster respectively; former Status Quo drummer Jeff Rich; Queen's Brian May; Chris Wolstenholme of Muse; and Parfitt's son, Rick Parfitt Jr.

== History ==
Parfitt had suffered a number of health issues throughout his life, including a number of heart attacks. On 14 June 2016, Parfitt suffered a fourth heart attack after performing with Status Quo in Antalya, Turkey. Following this, Parfitt retired from touring with the band for health reasons, and started to work on a number of projects, including his solo album. Prior to his death in December, Parfitt had completed vocal and guitar tracks for the album, and the rest was completed by producers and collaborators.

== Track listing ==
No.	Title	Writer(s)	Length
1.	"Twinkletoes"	Rick Parfitt, Jo Webb	2:55
2.	"Lonesome Road"	Parfitt, Webb	3:28
3.	"Over and Out"	Parfitt, Webb	3:20
4.	"When I Was Fallin' in Love"	Parfitt, Webb	3:23
5.	"Fight for Every Heartbeat"	Parfitt, Webb	3:24
6.	"Without You"	Parfitt	3:22
7.	"Long Distance Love"	John David	3:45
8.	"Everybody Knows How to Fly"	David	3:28
9.	"Lock Myself Away"	Parfitt, Webb	3:36
10.	"Halloween"	Parfitt	5:02

== Release and reception ==
Over and Out was released in the UK and Europe on 23 March 2018. It entered the UK album chart at number four on 5 April 2018 remaining in the top 75 for two weeks, making it the highest new entry that week, as well as one of the biggest selling debut albums for the year thus far. Upon release, it received generally positive reviews and reactions from both press and fans alike.

== Personnel ==
- Rick Parfitt – vocals and guitar on all tracks; ukulele on Track 4; writing on all tracks except 7 and 8
- Jo Webb – guitar and backing vocals on all tracks except Track 10; keyboards on Tracks 1, 2, 3, 4 and 6; writing on all tracks except 6, 7, 8 and 10
- Alex Toff – drums on all tracks except Track 10
- Tim Oliver – synthesizer on Tracks 1, 2 and 7
- Dave Marks – percussion on all tracks except Track 10, bass on Tracks 1, 3, 4, 5, 6 and 9
- Shannon Harris – piano on tracks 1, 5, 6, 8 and 9
- Rick Parfitt Jr. – backing vocals on Tracks 1, 5 and 8; percussion on Track 9
- Brian May – guitar on Track 1
- Eike Freese – backing vocals on Track 5
- Ivan Hussey – cello on Track 6
- Stephen Hussey – violin and viola on Track 6
- Chris Wolstenholme – bass, guitar and backing vocals on Track 7
- Alan Lancaster – backing vocals on Track 8
- John "Rhino" Edwards – bass on Tracks 2, 8 and 10
- Wayne Morris – guitar on Track 8
- Bob Young – harmonica on Track 8
- Jeff Rich – drums on Track 10
- Katie Kissoon – backing vocals on Track 10
- Stevie Vann – backing vocals on Track 10
- Vicki Brown (credited as "Vikki Brown") – backing vocals on Track 10
- John David – writing on Tracks 7 and 8

== Production ==
- Producer: Jo Webb
- Co-producer: Rick Parfitt Jnr
- Executive Producer: Paul Christian Ashcroft
- Engineering: Dave Marks, Eike Freese, Kris Fredriksson and Matt Prior
- Mastering: Frank Arkwright, Rob Cass
- Mixing: Ash Howes
- Cover art: Bernhard Prinz
- Artwork: Alexander Mertsch
- Photography: Heiko Roith

== Charts ==
Chart (2018)	Peak position
Austrian Albums (Ö3 Austria)	17
Belgian Albums (Ultratop Flanders)	98
Belgian Albums (Ultratop Wallonia)	145
Dutch Albums (Album Top 100)	17
German Albums (Offizielle Top 100)	13
Scottish Albums (Official Charts)	3
Swedish Albums (Sverigetopplistan)	16
Swiss Albums (Schweizer Hitparade)	11
UK Albums (Official Charts)	4
UK Independent Albums (Official Charts)	1
