= A Mess of Blues =

1960 single by Elvis Presley

Single by Elvis Presley
- A-side: "It's Now or Never" (US)
- B-side: "The Girl of My Best Friend" (international)
- Released: July 5, 1960
- Recorded: March 20, 1960
- Genre: Blues
- Length: 2:40
- Label: RCA Victor
- Songwriters: Doc Pomus, Mort Shuman

Elvis Presley singles chronology
"Stuck on You" / "Fame and Fortune" (1960)	"It's Now or Never" / "A Mess of Blues" (1960)	"Are You Lonesome Tonight?" / "I Gotta Know" (1960)

Elvis Presley UK singles chronology
"Stuck on You" (1960)	"A Mess of Blues" (1960)	"It's Now or Never" (1960)

"A Mess of Blues" is a song originally recorded by Elvis Presley for RCA Records in 1960, and written by Doc Pomus and Mort Shuman. Although released as the B-side to "It's Now or Never", "A Mess of Blues" reached number 32 in the U.S. It reached number 2 in the UK as an A-side.

The song was published by Elvis Presley Music, Inc.

The recording appeared on the 1968 RCA Victor compilation Elvis' Gold Records Volume 4.

== Personnel ==
Sourced from Keith Flynn.

The Blue Moon Boys

- Elvis Presley – lead vocals, acoustic rhythm guitar
- Scotty Moore – lead guitar
- D. J. Fontana – drums

Additional musicians

- Hank Garland – six-string bass guitar
- Bob Moore – double bass
- Floyd Cramer – piano
- Buddy Harman – drums
- The Jordanaires (Gordon Stoker, Neal Matthews, Hoyt Hawkins, Ray Walker) – backing vocals

== Status Quo cover ==
"A Mess of Blues"

Single by Status Quo

from the album Back to Back
- Released: 28 October 1983
- Genre: Boogie rock
- Length: 3:22
- Label: Vertigo
- Songwriters: Doc Pomus, Mort Shuman
- Producer: Status Quo

Status Quo singles chronology
"Ol' Rag Blues" (1983)	"A Mess of Blues" (1983)	"Marguerita Time" (1983)

"A Mess of Blues" was covered by British rock band Status Quo in 1983. It was included on the album Back to Back from which it was the second UK single, reaching a peak position of No. 15.

Due to a printing error, several hundred copies of the picture sleeve for this release were printed with the front and rear photographs inter-changed.

=== Track listing ===
==== 7" single ====
1. "A Mess of Blues" (D Pomus/M Shuman) (3.22)
2. "Big Man" (Lancaster/Green) (3.40)

==== 12" single ====
1. "A Mess of Blues" (Extended version) (D Pomus/M Shuman) (4.48)
2. "Big Man" (Lancaster/Green) (3.40)
3. "Young Pretender" (Rossi/Frost) (3.32)

== Other versions ==
The song has been recorded by Tom Jones and Jools Holland, Peter and Gordon, John Hiatt, Jeff Healey, Alexis Korner, Delbert McClinton, Lee Curtis and the All-Stars, Henry McCullough Blues Band, Scotty Moore and Paul Ansell, Robert Gordon and Chris Spedding with The Jordanaires, P.J. Proby, Chris Wilson, and Led Zeppelin as part of a medley. A French version named "Un ancien teenager" by Lucky Blondo was released in 1977.

== Charts ==
Elvis Presley

Chart (1960)	Peak position
Australia	11
Belgium	20
New Zealand (Lever Hit Parade)	6
Norway	4
UK	2
U.S. Billboard Hot 100	32
U.S. Cash Box Top 100	84

Status Quo

Chart (1983)	Peak position
Ireland (IRMA)	12
UK Singles (Official Charts)	15
