= Address book (disambiguation) =

An address book is a book or database used for storing contact information. The term may also refer to:

- Address Book (application), a macOS program
- "Address Book", a song by Status Quo on the album Perfect Remedy
