= Live Alive Quo =

Live album by Status Quo
- Released: 2 November 1992
- Recorded: 30 August 1992
- Venue: Sutton Park, Birmingham, UK
- Genre: Hard rock
- Length: 57:32
- Label: Polydor

Status Quo chronology
Rock 'til You Drop (1991)	Live Alive Quo (1992)	Thirsty Work (1994)

Professional ratings
Review scores
Source	Rating
AllMusic	Review

Live Alive Quo is the third live album by British rock band Status Quo, released on 2 November 1992. It was broadcast live on BBC Radio 1 as part of the station's 25th anniversary Party in the Park celebrations in Birmingham, England. The concert was watched by nearly 125,000 fans.

"Roadhouse Medley" is a 20-minute track, consisting of the main riff from the Doors' song "Roadhouse Blues", long instrumental sections and a medley of Quo tracks "The Wanderer", "Marguerita Time", "Living on an Island", "Break the Rules", "Something 'Bout You Baby I Like" and "The Price of Love". This medley section from the middle was released as a single. The track "Caroline" is the encore from the live set, but was placed before "Roadhouse Medley" in the album sequence.

== Track listings ==
=== Vinyl ===
1. "Whatever You Want" (Rick Parfitt, Andy Bown)
2. "In the Army Now" (Bolland, Bolland)
3. "Burning Bridges (On and Off and On Again)" (Francis Rossi, Andy Bown)
4. "Rockin' All Over the World" (John Fogerty)
5. "Caroline" (Rossi, Young)
6. "Roadhouse Medley"
- "Roadhouse Blues" (Jim Morrison, John Densmore, Ray Manzarek, Robbie Krieger)
- "The Wanderer" (Ernie Maresca)
- "Marguerita Time" Frost, Rossi
- "Living on an Island" Young, Parfitt
- "Break The Rules" Lancaster, Young, Rossi, Coghlan, Parfitt
- "Something 'Bout You Baby I Like" (Richard Supa)
- "The Price of Love" (D. Everly & P. Everly)
- "Roadhouse Blues" (Morrison, Densmore, Manzarek, Krieger)

=== CD ===
The last three tracks on the CD release - "Don't Drive My Car", "Hold You Back" and "Little Lady" - were recorded at a separate concert at Wembley Arena in 1990.

=== 2006 remaster bonus track ===
1. "Roadhouse Medley" (single version) (Maresca/Rossi/Frost/Parfitt/Young/Lancaster/Coghlan/Supa)

== Personnel ==
- Francis Rossi - Vocals & lead guitar
- Rick Parfitt - Vocals & guitar
- John Edwards - Bass
- Andy Bown - Keyboards
- Jeff Rich - Drums

== Charts ==
Chart (1992)	Peak position
UK Albums (OCC)	37
