= The Anniversary Waltz (Status Quo song) =

- Cover artwork for Part One. The artwork for Part Two is coloured red.

Single by Status Quo

from the album Rocking All Over the Years
- Released: 17 September 1990 (Part One); 3 December 1990 (Part Two)
- Length: 10:38
- Label: Vertigo; Phonogram
- Songwriter: Various
- Producer: Pip Williams

Status Quo singles chronology
"Little Dreamer" (1989)	"The Anniversary Waltz" (1990)	"Can't Give You More" (1991)

"The Anniversary Waltz" is the title of two medley singles released in 1990 by English rock band Status Quo. The medleys consist of hit songs from the 1950s, 1960s, and 1970s. One of the songs performed, Dion's "The Wanderer" had previously been covered by Status Quo in 1984. "The Anniversary Waltz" was divided into two parts for release as a single. Part One was the bigger hit, reaching number two on the UK Singles Chart, and was included on their 1990 compilation album Rocking All Over the Years.

The sleeves for all formats feature the legend "It's Live Sonny", which was included (together with a small sketch of a rabbit) in answer to critics who had likened "The Anniversary Waltz" to previous releases by Jive Bunny. The first batch contained two photos of Rick Parfitt instead of one of Parfitt and one of Jeff Rich. Due to a pressing error, some 12-inch copies included live versions of "Little Lady" and "Paper Plane"; these were intended to be B-sides of the cancelled release of the re-mixed version of "The Power of Rock".

== Track listings ==
=== Part One ===
7-inch and cassette

1. "The Anniversary Waltz (Part One)" (5:25) featuring:
  - "Let's Dance" (Lee)
  - "Red River Rock" (Kind/Mack/Mendlesohn)
  - "No Particular Place to Go" (Berry)
  - "The Wanderer" (Maresca)
  - "I Hear You Knocking" (Bartholomew/King)
  - "Lucille" (Collins/Penniman)
  - "Great Balls of Fire" (Hammer/Blackwell)
2. "The Power of Rock" (Parfitt/Williams/Rossi) (4:37)

12-inch and CD

1. "The Anniversary Waltz" (10:30) featuring:
  - "Rock 'n' Roll Music" (Berry)
  - "Lover Please" (Swan)
  - "That'll Be the Day" (Allison/Holly/Petty)
  - "Singing the Blues" (Endsley)
  - "When Will I Be Loved" (P Everly)
  - "Let's Work Together" (Harrison)
  - "You Keep a-Knockin'" (Penniman)
  - "Long Tall Sally" (Johnson/Blackwell/Penniman)
  - "Let's Dance" (Lee)
  - "Red River Rock" (Kind/Mack/Mendlesohn)
  - "No Particular Place to Go" (Berry)
  - "The Wanderer" (Maresca)
  - "I Hear You Knocking" (Bartholomew/King)
  - "Lucille" (Collins/Penniman)
  - "Great Balls of Fire" (Hammer/Blackwell)
2. "The Power of Rock" (Parfitt/Williams/Rossi) (4:37)
3. "Perfect Remedy" (Rossi/Frost) (4:33)

=== Part Two ===
7-inch, cassette, and CD

1. "The Anniversary Waltz (Part Two)" (5:22) featuring:
  - "Rock 'n' Roll Music" (Berry)
  - "Lover Please" (Swan)
  - "That'll Be the Day" (Allison/Holly/Petty)
  - "Singing the Blues" (Endsley)
  - "When Will I Be Loved" (P Everly)
  - "Let's Work Together" (Harrison)
  - "You Keep a-Knockin'" (Penniman)
  - "Long Tall Sally" (Johnson/Blackwell/Penniman)
2. "Dirty Water" (Live N.E.C Birmingham, 17/18 December 1989) (Rossi/Young) (3:56)

== Charts ==
=== Part One ===
==== Weekly charts ====
Chart (1990–1991)	Peak position
Austria (Ö3 Austria Top 40)	9
Belgium (Ultratop 50 Flanders)	13
Denmark (IFPI)	9
Europe (Eurochart Hot 100)	8
Germany (GfK)	17
Ireland (IRMA)	3
Netherlands (Dutch Top 40)	4
Netherlands (Single Top 100)	5
New Zealand (Recorded Music NZ)	30
Sweden (Sverigetopplistan)	10
Switzerland (Schweizer Hitparade)	12
UK Singles (OCC)	2

==== Year-end charts ====
Chart (1990)	Position
Netherlands (Dutch Top 40)	71
Netherlands (Single Top 100)	61
Sweden (Topplistan)	75
UK Singles (OCC)	36

Chart (1991)	Position
Sweden (Topplistan)	86

=== Part Two ===
Chart (1990–1991)	Peak position
Belgium (Ultratop 50 Flanders)	33
Ireland (IRMA)	14
Netherlands (Single Top 100)	66
UK Singles (OCC)	16

== Certifications ==
Region	Certification	Certified units/sales
United Kingdom (BPI)	Gold	400,000^{^}
^{^} Shipments figures based on certification alone.

== Release history ==
Region	Version	Date	Format(s)	Label(s)	Ref.
United Kingdom	Part One	17 September 1990	7-inch vinyl; 12-inch vinyl; CD; cassette	Vertigo; Phonogram	
United Kingdom	Part One	24 September 1990	7-inch silver vinyl	Vertigo; Phonogram	
United Kingdom	Part One	1 October 1990	Extra 12-inch vinyl	Vertigo; Phonogram	
United Kingdom	Part Two	3 December 1990	7-inch vinyl	Vertigo; Phonogram	
United Kingdom	Part Two	10 December 1990	CD; cassette	Vertigo; Phonogram	
Australia	Part One	10 December 1990	7-inch vinyl; cassette	Vertigo	
