= Perfect Remedy =

Studio album by Status Quo
- Released: 13 November 1989
- Recorded: Summer 1989
- Studio: Compass Point (Nassau, Bahamas)
- Genre: Country rock, pop rock
- Length: 47:00
- Label: Vertigo
- Producer: Pip Williams

Status Quo chronology
Ain't Complaining (1988)	Perfect Remedy (1989)	Rocking All Over the Years (1990)

Professional ratings
Review scores
Source	Rating
AllMusic	2.5/5 stars

Perfect Remedy is the nineteenth studio album by British rock band Status Quo. In terms of British chart success, it marked a new low for the band, reaching a high of only No. 49 during a two-week run. The two singles from it, "Not at All" and "Little Dreamer", peaked at No. 50 and No. 76 respectively. In Francis Rossi and Rick Parfitt's duel 2004 autobiography, XS All Areas, Rossi said that it sold well in Europe and Australia, but they were back to square one in Britain: "I don't know why it did so poorly. You could argue that the scene had moved on." Affairs quickly returned to normal in the UK when their next studio album in 1991, Rock 'Til You Drop, reached the top 10.

== Track listing ==
1. "Little Dreamer" (Francis Rossi, Bernie Frost) 4:04
2. "Not at All" (Francis Rossi, Bernie Frost) 2:54
3. "Heart On Hold" (Andy Bown, Phil Palmer) 3:36
4. "Perfect Remedy" (Francis Rossi, Bernie Frost) 4:36
5. "Address Book" (Francis Rossi, Bernie Frost) 3:37
6. "The Power of Rock" (Rick Parfitt, Pip Williams, Francis Rossi) 6:04
7. "The Way I Am" (John Edwards, Jeff Rich, Mike Paxman) 3:35
8. "Tommy's in Love" (Francis Rossi, Bernie Frost) 3:01
9. "Man Overboard" (Rick Parfitt, Pip Williams) 4:29
10. "Going Down for the First Time" (Andy Bown, John Edwards) 4:00
11. "Throw Her a Line" (Francis Rossi, Bernie Frost) 3:34
12. "1000 Years" (Francis Rossi, Bernie Frost) 3:31

=== 2006 remaster bonus tracks ===
1. "Gone Thru The Slips" (Andy Bown) 3:42
2. "Rotten to the Bone" (Francis Rossi, Andy Bown) 3:40
3. "Doing It All for You" (Rick Parfitt, Pip Williams) 4:12
4. "Dirty Water" (Live) (Francis Rossi, Robert Young)
5. "The Power of Rock" (edited version) (Rick Parfitt, Pip Williams, Francis Rossi)
6. "The Anniversary Waltz Part One Medley" (Jim Lee, Tom King, Ira Mack, Fred Mendelsohn, Chuck Berry, Ernesto Maresca, Dave Bartholomew, Pearl King, Al Collins, Richard Penniman, Jack Hammer, Otis Blackwell)

== Personnel ==
Status Quo

- Francis Rossi - vocals, lead guitar
- Rick Parfitt - vocals, guitar
- John Edwards - bass
- Andy Bown - keyboards
- Jeff Rich - drums

Recorded at Compass Point Studios, Nassau, Bahamas in summer 1989.

== Charts ==
Chart (1988)	Peak position
Swedish Albums (Sverigetopplistan)	40
Swiss Albums (Schweizer Hitparade)	26
UK Albums (OCC)	49

Chart (2020)	Peak position
Scottish Albums (OCC)	67

== Certifications ==
Region	Certification	Certified units/sales
United Kingdom (BPI)	Silver	60,000^{^}
^{^} Shipments figures based on certification alone.
