= Not at All =

Single by Status Quo

from the album Perfect Remedy
- Released: 16 October 1989
- Genre: Blues rock, boogie rock
- Length: 2:51
- Label: Vertigo
- Songwriter(s): Rossi/Frost
- Producer(s): Pip Williams

Status Quo singles chronology
"Burning Bridges" (1988)	"Not at All" (1989)	"Little Dreamer" (1989)

"Not at All" is a single by the British rock band Status Quo, released in 1989. It was included on the album Perfect Remedy.

== Track listing ==
=== 7 inch ===
1. "Not at All" (Rossi/Frost) (2.51)
2. "Gone Thru The Slips" (Bown) (3.39)

=== 12 inch ===
1. "Not at All" (Rossi/Frost) (2.51)
2. "Everytime I Think Of You" (Rich/Edwards/Paxman) (3.48)
3. "Gone Thru The Slips" (Bown) (3.39)

=== Cassette ===
1. "Not at All" (Rossi/Frost) (2.51)
2. "Gone Thru The Slips" (Bown) (3.39)

=== CD ===
1. "Not at All" (Rossi/Frost) (2.51)
2. "Everytime I Think Of You" (Rich/Edwards/Paxman) (3.48)
3. "Gone Thru The Slips" (Bown) (3.39)

== Charts ==
Chart (1989)	Peak position
UK Singles (OCC)	50
