= If You Can't Stand the Heat... =

Studio album by Status Quo
- Released: 27 October 1978
- Recorded: 1978
- Studio: Wisseloord (Hilversum, Netherlands)
- Genre: Hard rock; boogie rock
- Length: 37:54
- Label: Vertigo
- Producer: Pip Williams

Status Quo chronology
Rockin' All Over the World (1977)	If You Can't Stand the Heat... (1978)	Whatever You Want (1979)

Singles from If You Can't Stand the Heat...
- 1. "Again and Again" Released: 25 August 1978; 2. "Accident Prone" Released: 17 November 1978

Professional ratings
Review scores
Source	Rating
AllMusic	4/5 stars

If You Can't Stand the Heat... is the eleventh studio album by British rock band Status Quo. Recorded at Wisseloord Studios, Hilversum, Holland, and produced by Pip Williams, it was released in October 1978 and reached number three on the UK Albums Chart. The sleeve notes that Aphex Aural Exciter was used in the recording process. Unusually for a Status Quo record, a brass section, the David Katz Horns, was used, as well as a backing vocal trio: Jacquie Sullivan, Stevie Lange, and Joy Yates.

"Again and Again" was the first single released from the album, reaching number 13 on the UK singles chart.

The second single released from the album was an edited version of "Accident Prone", which peaked at number 36 in the UK.

== Track listing ==
1. "Again and Again" (Rick Parfitt, Andy Bown, Jackie Lynton) — 3:41
2. "I'm Giving Up My Worryin'" (Francis Rossi, Bernie Frost) — 3:02
3. "Gonna Teach You to Love Me" (Alan Lancaster, Michael Green) — 3:11
4. "Someone Show Me Home" (Rossi, Frost) — 3:49
5. "Long Legged Linda" (Bown) — 3:29
6. "Oh, What a Night" (Parfitt, Bown) — 3:46
7. "Accident Prone" (Pip Williams, Peter Hutchins) — 5:08
8. "Stones" (Lancaster) — 3:53
9. "Let Me Fly" (Rossi, Frost) — 4:25
10. "Like a Good Girl" (Rossi, Robert Young) — 3:26

=== 2005 remaster bonus track ===
1. "Accident Prone" (single version) (Williams, Hutchins)

== Personnel ==
Status Quo

- Francis Rossi – guitar, lead vocals
- Rick Parfitt – rhythm guitar, lead vocals on "Again And Again" & "Long Legged Linda" & "Oh! What A Night"
- Alan Lancaster – bass guitar, guitar, lead vocals on "I'm Gonna Teach You To Love Me" & "Stones"
- John Coghlan – drums

Additional musicians

- Andy Bown – keyboards, backing vocals
- Frank Ricotti – percussion
- Jacquie Sullivan – backing vocals
- Stevie Lange – backing vocals
- Joy Yates – backing vocals
- The David Katz Horns – horns

== Charts ==
Chart (1978–79)	Peak position
Australian Albums (Kent Music Report)	21
French Albums (SNEP)	20
Dutch Albums (Album Top 100)	8
German Albums (Offizielle Top 100)	11
Norwegian Albums (VG-lista)	18
Swedish Albums (Sverigetopplistan)	15
UK Albums (OCC)	3

Chart (2016)	Peak position
UK Rock & Metal Albums (OCC)	17

== Certifications ==
Region	Certification	Certified units/sales
Australia (ARIA)	Gold	20,000^{^}
France (SNEP)	Gold	100,000^{*}
Switzerland (IFPI Switzerland)	Gold	25,000^{^}
United Kingdom (BPI)	Gold	100,000^{^}
^{*} Sales figures based on certification alone.^{^} Shipments figures based on certification alone.
