= Can't Give You More =

Single by Status Quo

from the album Rock 'til You Drop
- Released: 27 August 1991
- Genre: Rock, country rock
- Length: 3:55
- Label: Vertigo
- Songwriter: Rossi/Young
- Producer: Francis Rossi

Status Quo singles chronology
"The Anniversary Waltz - Part Two" (1990)	"Can't Give You More" (1991)	"Rock 'til You Drop" (1992)

"Can't Give You More" is a song by the British Rock band Status Quo. The original version was included on the album Rockin' All Over The World. It was re-recorded in 1991 during the band's Rock 'til You Drop album sessions, and was to be used as an advertising campaign for Perrier Water; the words 'Eau Eau Eau' were included in the title on some of the 7-inch vinyl copies. However, due to various problems encountered by the Perrier company at the time, the campaign was cancelled. The single was released anyway and reached number 37 in the UK charts, and included on the album.

== Track listing ==
- 7 inch/cassette
1. "Can't Give You More" (Rossi/Young) (3.55)
2. "Dead in the Water" (Rossi/Bown) (3.45)
- 12 inch/CD
1. "Can't Give You More" (Rossi/Young) (3.55)
2. "Dead in the Water" (Rossi/Bown) (3.45)
3. "Mysteries from the Ball" (Rossi/Parfitt) (3.42)

== Charts ==
Chart (1991)	Peak position
Denmark (IFPI)	6
Sweden (Sverigetopplistan)	34
UK Singles (OCC)	37
UK Airplay (Music Week)	17
