= Rock 'til You Drop (song) =

Single by Status Quo

from the album Rock 'til You Drop
- Released: 6 January 1992
- Genre: Rock
- Length: 3:13
- Label: Vertigo
- Songwriter: Bown
- Producer: Francis Rossi

Status Quo singles chronology
"Can't Give You More" (1991)	"Rock 'til You Drop" (1992)	"Roadhouse Medley" (1992)

"Rock 'til You Drop" is a single released by the British rock band Status Quo in 1992. It was included on the album Rock 'til You Drop.

It was released in place of the original single choice "Fakin' the Blues". The proposed cover for "Fakin' the Blues" was adapted for this release. This was the last 12 inch vinyl release from the band. The CD was packaged in a guitar shaped cardboard sleeve which had originally been intended to house the cancelled song "Fakin' The Blues". The original track listing was stickered over and the CDs were numbered up to 10,000, but numbers surpassing 10,000 have been found.

The song was reprised, in 2014, for the band's thirty-first studio album Aquostic (Stripped Bare). It was featured in the ninety-minute launch performance of the album at London's Roundhouse on 22 October, the concert being recorded and broadcast live by BBC Radio 2 as part of their In Concert series.

== Track listing ==
- 7 inch/Cassette
1. "Rock 'til You Drop" (Bown) (3.13)
2. "Medley" (featuring: "Caroline" (Rossi/Young), "Down Down" (Rossi/Young), "Whatever You Want" (Parfitt/Bown)/"Rockin All Over the World" (J Fogerty) (3.52)
- 12 inch/CD
1. "Rock 'til You Drop" (Bown) (3.13)
2. "Medley" (3:52)
3. "Forty Five Hundred Times" (re-recorded) (Rossi/Parfitt) (12.52 - CD / vinyl fades out early for space reasons and is 7 to 8 minutes long)

== Charts ==
Chart (1992)	Peak position
UK Singles (OCC)	38
UK Airplay (Music Week)	49
