= Ol' Rag Blues =

Single by Status Quo

from the album Back to Back
- Released: 2 September 1983
- Genre: Rock
- Length: 2:51
- Label: Vertigo
- Songwriters: Alan Lancaster, Keith Lamb
- Producer: Status Quo

Status Quo singles chronology
"Caroline (live)" (1982)	"Ol' Rag Blues" (1983)	"A Mess of Blues" (1983)

"Ol' Rag Blues" is a song recorded by the British rock band Status Quo. It was included on the album Back to Back in 1983, and also released as a single. As of 2023, "Ol' Rag Blues" remains the only one of the band's 22 UK top ten singles to have never been performed live.

"Ol' Rag Blues" originally had a lead vocal by Alan Lancaster; however, the final recording used for this single featured a lead vocal performance by Francis Rossi. Lancaster wrote the song with Keith Lamb, lead singer of British bands The Kase, Sleepy Talk and Mr. Toad, and founder and lead singer of Australian glam rock band Hush.

== Track listing ==
=== 7-inch ===
1. "Ol' Rag Blues" (Lancaster/Lamb) (2.51)
2. "Stay The Night" (Rossi/Miller/Frost) (3.20)

=== 12-inch ===
1. "Ol' Rag Blues" (extended remix) (Lancaster/Lamb) (4.50)
2. "Stay The Night" (Rossi/Miller/Frost) (3.20)
3. "Whatever You Want (Live At The N.E.C.)" (Parfitt/Bown) (4.21)

== Charts ==
Chart (1983)	Peak position
Belgium (Ultratop 50 Flanders)	31
Germany (GfK)	47
Ireland (IRMA)	7
Netherlands (Single Top 100)	20
Switzerland (Schweizer Hitparade)	17
UK Singles (Official Charts)	9
