= Lucky Blondo =

French singer (born 1944)

Lucky Blondo (born Gerard Blondiot, 23 July 1944 in Paris, France) is a French singer who was popular in the 1960s.

His heyday came during the emergence of French rock.

== Career ==
His main successes were "Sheila", "Baby Face", "Dix petits indiens", "Sur ton visage une larme" (a French version of the song "Una lacrima sul viso" by Bobby Solo), and "Des roses rouges pour un ange blond".

He is one of the few French singers to have performed, in 1977, 33 tours in Nashville with The Jordanaires, the vocal group that sang with Elvis Presley.

In 1978, still in Nashville, he recorded an album of covers entitled Ce vieux cow boy, including, in particular, "Une santé dacier" and "On ne t'oubliera jamais".

He then worked in advertising, before returning to singing in 2006 for a retro show.

He lives in Audierne, a seaside city in southern Finistère, where he lived in the mid-1970s.

== Discography ==
Super 45s

- Betty et Jenny / Je bois, je dors et j'oublie / Baby reste avec moi / C'est merveilleux, Fontana, 1962
- Multiplication / Une fille comme toi / Dis-moi oui / Dans la rue des souvenirs, Fontana, 1962
- Sheila / Avec toi / C'est le mashed potatoes / Isabelle, Fontana, 1962
- Au cœur du silence / Baby Face / Filles / Vous souvenez-vous, Fontana, 1963
- L'autre nuit / Trop sage pour aimer / J'ai un secret à te dire / Comment l'oublier, Fontana, 1963
- Sois gentille / Dans l'eau bleue / Avec des si / Ne pleure pas, Fontana, 1964
- Tu me regretteras / On a toujours ses yeux d'enfant / Clopin clopant / Bien sage, Fontana, 1964
- Une fille me sourit / Sur ton visage une larme / Oh my darling / Roseline, Fontana, 1964
- Un garçon, une fille / Bee boom / Tout le monde un jour / Pour moi, Fontana, 1965
- Des roses pour Marjorie / Des roses rouges pour un ange blond / C'est toi que je préfère / Tu l'oublieras cette fille, Fontana 1965
- Marie aux yeux candides / Chagrin d'amour / Je veux oublier / Au revoir, Fontana, 1965
- Un oiseau sur la mer / Du Cap-Horn à Mexico / Le jeudi c'est fait pour s'amuser / Le soleil est en vacances, Fontana, 1965
- Cincinnati Kid / Une fille tranquille / Bye bye bye, moi je reste / Où est-elle aujourd'hui, Fontana, 1966
- Jusqu'en septembre / C'est une fille en or / C'est bête à pleurer / Julie, Fontana, 1966
- La vie / Tous ces voyages / Dommage, dommage / Ah oui, ah oui, Fontana, 1966
- C'est ma chanson / Sous le soleil exactement / Rien pour faire un mari / Chanson de Maxence, Fontana, 1967
- Le jeu du téléphone / Dans les bras de l'amour / Laurence / Sacré Nestor, Fontana, 1967
- La dernière valse / Tu vivras deux fois / Un monde avec toi / Parfaite, Fontana, 1967
- Goodbye Colette / Chacun son bonheur / J'ai eu si peur / Ne dis jamais que c'est fini, Fontana, 1968
- Les filles de Camaret / Petite Emilie / Vivre une autre vie / Que Paris est triste, La Compagnie, 1969

45s

- Je rentre chez moi pour Noël / Noël blanc, Canusa, 1968
- Faire woopie / Attends-moi, Revolution, 1969
- Mon cœur est un violon / Pense à moi, Fontana, 1969
- Ma route / Sous les arcades, Fontana, 1969
- Les années 60 (c'était nos années folles à nous) / La musique en tête et le verre à la main, Pathé Marconi 1976

Albums 33s

- Multiplication (25 cm), Fontana, 1962
- Dix petits indiens (25 cm), Fontana, 1963
- Sois gentille (25 cm), Fontana, 1963
- Des roses pour Marjorie (30 cm), Fontana, 1965
- Sur ton visage une larme (30 cm), Fontana, 1965, compilation
- Dommage, dommage (30 cm), Fontana, 1966
- La dernière valse (30 cm), Fontana, 1967
- To Elvis from Nashville (30 cm), Philips, 1977
- Ce vieux cow boy (30 cm), Philips, 1978

CDs

- Le rock c'est ça!, PolyGram Distribution, 1990 ou Twistin' the Rock, Philips-Mercury, 2002

Tracks: "Betty et Jenny" / "Je bois, je dors et j'oublie" / "Baby reste avec moi" / "C'est merveilleux" / "Multiplication" / "Une fille comme toi" / "Dis-moi oui" / "Dans la rue des souvenirs" / "Hey baby" / "Cri de ma vie" / "C'est le mashed potatoes" / "Isabelle" / "Sheila" / "Avec toi" / "Au cœur du silence" / "Dix petits indiens" / "Filles" / "Vous souvenez-vous" / "Baby face" / "Jenny" / "Tout haut tout bas" / "L'autre nuit" / "Trop sage pour aimer" / "J'ai un secret à te dire" / "Comment l'oublier"

- Multiplication, Mercury, 2003

Tracks: "Multiplication" / "Hey Baby" / "Baby reste avec moi" / "Cri de ma vie" / "Dis-moi oui" / "Une fille comme toi" / "Dans la rue des souvenirs" / "Betty et Jenny"

- Sur ton visage une larme, Harmonia Mundi, 2004

"Sur ton visage une larme" / "Des roses rouges pour un ange blond" / "Tout le monde un jour" / "Un monde avec toi" / "My darling Clémentine" / "C'est si bon" / "Over the rainbow" / "La fille d'Ipanema" / "Laura" / "La Mélancolie" / "Paris c'est loin de la mer" / "Lola
