= Back to Back (Status Quo album) =

Studio album by Status Quo
- Released: 25 November 1983
- Recorded: 1983
- Studio: AIR (Salem, Montserrat)
- Genre: Hard rock, boogie rock
- Length: 32:55
- Label: Vertigo
- Producer: Status Quo

Status Quo chronology
From the Makers of... (1982)	Back to Back (1983)	Live at the N.E.C. (1984)

Singles from Back to Back
- 1. "Ol' Rag Blues" Released: 2 September 1983; 2. "A Mess of Blues" Released: 28 October 1983; 3. "Marguerita Time" Released: 2 December 1983; 4. "Going Down Town Tonight" Released: 11 May 1984

Back to Back is the sixteenth studio album by British rock band Status Quo and released in November 1983. For the first time in the group's history, it featured four singles, "Ol' Rag Blues" (highest position No. 9), "A Mess of Blues", originally a hit for Elvis Presley (No. 15), "Marguerita Time" (No. 3), and "Going Down Town Tonight" (which reached No. 20 in a different, re-recorded version to the album version.) The album entered the UK chart at its highest position of No. 9.

It was the last album to feature original bass guitarist Alan Lancaster, as well as drummer Pete Kircher.

== Production ==
Lancaster co-wrote the first single, "Ol' Rag Blues", with Keith Lamb, lead singer of British bands The Kase, Sleepy Talk and Mr. Toad, and founder and lead singer of Australia's successful glam rock band Hush. Lancaster was angered when the production company declined to release the version featuring his lead vocal (which has since been made available as a bonus track on the 2006 remastered reissue), in preference to that featuring the voice of Francis Rossi. He also made no secret of his dislike of "Marguerita Time", which he thought was too pop-orientated for the group.

When they appeared on BBC's Top of the Pops to mime to the single, his place was taken by Jim Lea of Slade, who were also on the programme that week. The Top of the Pops performance was also notable for Rick Parfitt falling into Pete Kircher's drum set near the end of the song while the song kept playing. On the DVD Hello Quo, Parfitt claims that he had planned this action, although many people thought he was drunk. On the same DVD, Alan Lancaster also said that he wasn't so concerned with "Marguerita Time" as he was with "Going Down Town Tonight", which – according to him – was not a Status Quo recording and featured no Status Quo musicians apart from Francis Rossi.

== Release ==
The fourth and the final single, "Going Down Town Tonight", was released in 1984. A different version was included on the album Back to Back. "Going Down Town Tonight" was written by a songwriter/pianist Guy Johnson. Johnson had originally approached Rossi with some demo pieces in 1981 and Rossi later signed him to his publishing company Dump Music. The song was re-recorded and extended for this release. The picture sleeve featured a cartoon drawing of the band by Rob Fletcher, an artist who has also worked extensively with Bob Young.

"Too Close To The Ground" had also been a planned single, as adverts in the press announced that it was to be the band's new single.

== Track listing ==
No.	Title	Writer(s)	Length
1.	"A Mess of Blues"	Doc Pomus, Mort Shuman	3:23
2.	"Ol' Rag Blues"	Alan Lancaster, Keith Lamb	2:51
3.	"Can't Be Done"	Francis Rossi, Bernie Frost	3:07
4.	"Too Close to the Ground"	Rick Parfitt, Andrew Bown	3:43
5.	"No Contract"	Parfitt, Bown	3:40
6.	"Win or Lose"	Rossi, Frost	2:35
7.	"Marguerita Time"	Rossi, Frost	3:27
8.	"Your Kind of Love"	Lancaster, Ferguson Skinner	3:24
9.	"Stay the Night"	Rossi, Frost, Andrew Miller	3:02
10.	"Going Down Town Tonight"	Guy Johnson	3:33

The 2006 remaster has a snippet of Bernie Frost singing "I've Got Tears In My Ears From Lying On My Back In Bed Crying Over You" by Homer and Jethro at the beginning of "No Contract" and a slightly longer fade, extending the runtime by almost twenty seconds.

=== 2006 remaster bonus tracks ===
No.	Title	Writer(s)	Length
11.	"The Wanderer"	Ernie Maresca	3:27
12.	"Going Down Town Tonight [Re-recorded Single Version]" (initial releases contain a different mix of the album version, which was mistaken from the single version.)	Johnson	3:38
13.	"I Wonder Why"	Rossi, Frost	3:59
14.	"Ol' Rag Blues [Extended Version]" (This contained a different mix and also some different vocals for parts of it, as well as being extended.)	Lancaster, Lamb	4:54
15.	"A Mess of Blues [Extended Version]"	Pomus, Shuman	4:48
16.	"Cadillac Ranch [Recording during the session for what became The Wanderer single]"	Bruce Springsteen	4:15
17.	"Ol' Rag Blues [Alan Lancaster Version containing a different mix and vocals]"	Lancaster, Lamb	2:49
18.	"The Wanderer [Sharon the Nag Mix]" (This was released in 1988 as track 4 of the Who Gets the Love CD single. The bass and drum parts from the 1984 version are re-tracked by John 'Rhino' Edwards and Jeff Rich respectively)	Ernie Maresca	3:34

=== 2018 Deluxe Edition bonus tracks ===
No.	Title	Writer(s)	Length
1.	"The Wanderer" (Single)
2.	"Going Down Town Tonight" ((re-recorded version) - Single)
3.	"I Wonder Why" (Original B side to cancelled Too Close to the Ground single)
4.	"Ol' Rag Blues" (Extended Version - contains different mix and some different vocals at times, as well as being extended)
5.	"A Mess of Blues" (Extended Version)
6.	"Cadillac Ranch" (Out-take from planned single - song chosen for single was The Wanderer)
7.	"Ol' Rag Blues" (original Alan Lancaster Version containing a different mix as well as vocals.)
8.	"Modern Romance" (Extended Version)	Francis Rossi / Bernard Frost
9.	"I Wonder Why" (Extended Version)	Francis Rossi / Bernard Frost
10.	"The House" (this was recorded in the mid 70s)	Bernard Frost
11.	"What Do You Want to Hear Today?" (this was recorded in the mid 70s)	Bernard Frost
12.	"Modern Romance"	Francis Rossi / Bernard Frost
13.	"I Wonder Why?"	Francis Rossi / Bernard Frost
14.	"Jealousy"	Francis Rossi / Bernard Frost
15.	"Where Are You Now?"	Francis Rossi / Bernard Frost
16.	"That's All Right"	Francis Rossi / Bernard Frost

== Personnel ==
=== Status Quo ===
- Rick Parfitt – guitar, vocals
- Francis Rossi – guitar, vocals
- Alan Lancaster – bass, vocals
- Andrew Bown – keyboards, backing vocals
- Pete Kircher – drums, backing vocals

=== Additional personnel ===
- Bernie Frost – backing vocals
- Tim Summerhayes – engineering
- Steve Churchyard – engineering
- Chris "Props" Ranson – instrument technician

== Charts ==
Chart (1983–84)	Peak position
Australian Albums (Kent Music Report)	97
Dutch Albums (Album Top 100)	26
German Albums (Offizielle Top 100)	60
Swedish Albums (Sverigetopplistan)	38
Swiss Albums (Schweizer Hitparade)	20
UK Albums (OCC)	9

"Going Down Town Tonight"
Chart (1984)	Peak position
Ireland (IRMA)	14
UK Singles (OCC)	20

== Certifications ==
Region	Certification	Certified units/sales
United Kingdom (BPI)	Gold	100,000^{^}
^{^} Shipments figures based on certification alone.
