= Little Dreamer (song) =

Single by Status Quo

from the album Perfect Remedy
- Released: November 1989
- Genre: Rock
- Length: 3:58
- Label: Vertigo
- Songwriter(s): Rossi/Frost
- Producer(s): Pip Williams

Status Quo singles chronology
"Not at All" (1989)	"Little Dreamer" (1989)	"The Anniversary Waltz - Part One" (1990)

"Little Dreamer" is a single released by the British rock band Status Quo in 1989. It was included on the album Perfect Remedy.

The 7-inch was also issued with a Perfect Remedy tour patch, and the 12-inch was also packaged in a gatefold picture sleeve which featured Status Quo's Christmas Game.

== Track listing ==
=== 7 inch / cassette ===
1. "Little Dreamer" (Rossi/Frost) (3.58)
2. "Rotten to the Bone" (Rossi/Bown) (3.39)

=== 12 inch / CD ===
1. "Little Dreamer" (Rossi/Frost) (3.58)
2. "Rotten to the Bone" (Rossi/Bown) (3.39)
3. "Doing It All for You" (Parfitt/Williams) (4.08)

== Charts ==
Chart (1989)	Peak position
UK Singles (OCC)	76
