= Richie Malone =

Irish musician (born 1986)

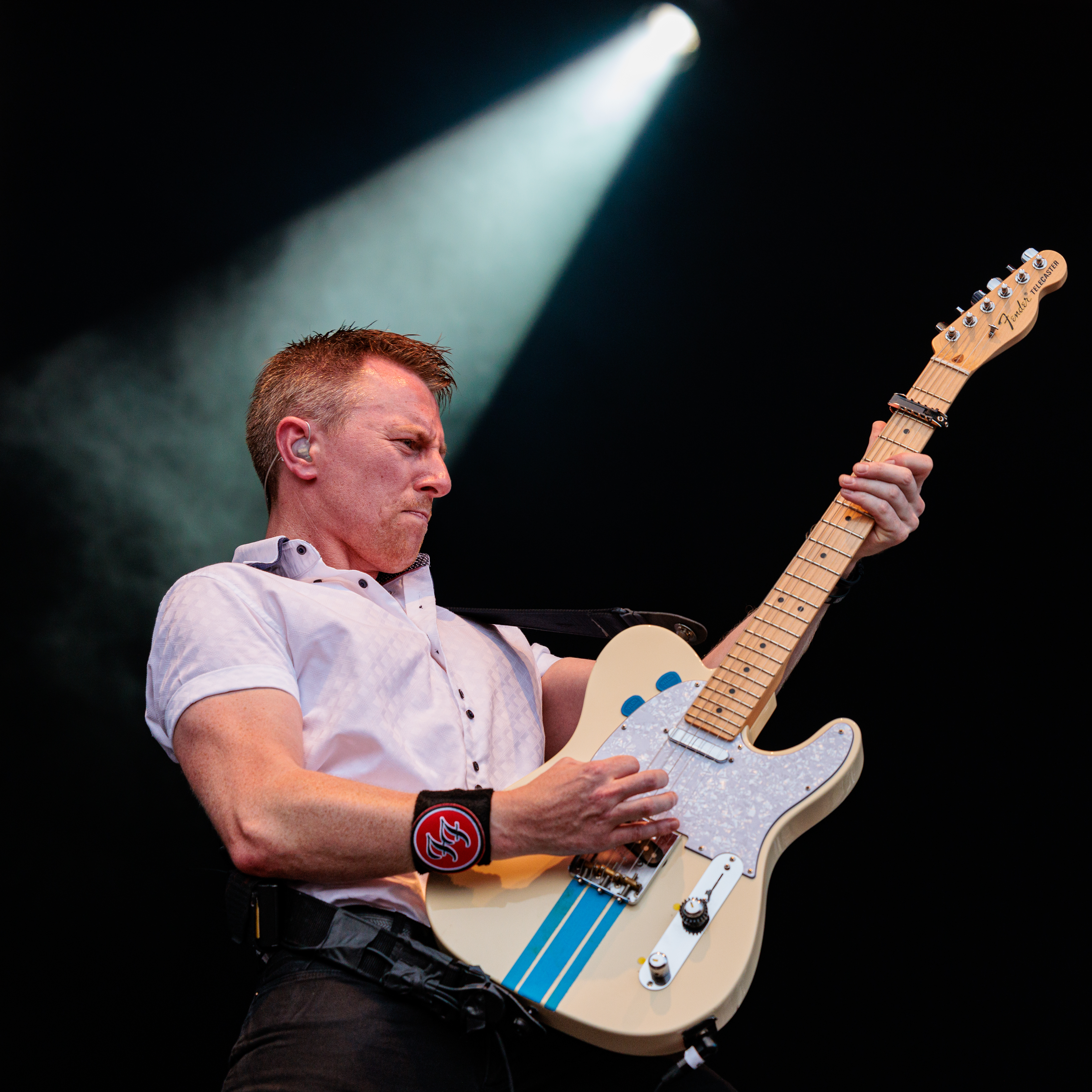
- Malone performing with Status Quo at Arvika hamnfest in Arvika, Sweden, 2024

Background information
- Born: 18 March 1986 (age 40); Dublin, Ireland
- Origin: Dublin, Ireland
- Genres: Rock
- Instruments: Guitar, vocals
- Years active: 2000s–present
- Spouse: Jessica Fennell (m. 2020)
- Website: Facebook

Richie Malone (born 18 March 1986) is an Irish musician who plays rhythm guitar for English rock band Status Quo. Malone first played with the band in July 2016, when previous guitarist Rick Parfitt was no longer able to tour due to a heart attack. Parfitt died in December 2016, and Malone became his permanent replacement.

== Career ==
Malone was the frontman of RAID, a rock band based in Dublin. He was a fan of Status Quo through his father, first seeing them live in concert in 1999. He was particularly a fan of rhythm guitarist Rick Parfitt, emulating his playing style from a young age, and travelling to England to have a replica of Parfitt's trademark white 1965 Fender Telecaster made.

Rick was just everything I admired – his stage presence, his guitar playing, even his hair. I had long curly blond hair myself for a while but now it's short which is better, since I don't want to try to imitate him.

— Richie Malone, AntiHero Magazine, 3 December 2016

Malone met the band a number of times backstage after concerts, and became close friends with them. In June 2016, whilst touring with Status Quo on their "Last of the Electrics" tour, Parfitt suffered a severe heart attack and was unable to finish the tour. Malone was selected to substitute for Parfitt for gigs in Belgium and Edinburgh in July, before Freddie Edwards, the son of Status Quo bassist John "Rhino" Edwards, took over. Malone filled in for Parfitt again for concerts in later 2016. Parfitt died on 24 December 2016, and Malone became a permanent band member.

== Equipment ==
Malone uses three Telecasters and two Mayson acoustic guitars on tour with Status Quo. The first Telecaster is a custom built by Mike Smith designed by Malone himself with .13–56 strings called the "AC Cobra". The second is a replica of his predecessor Rick Parfitt's white Telecaster built by Mike Smith also with .13–56 strings, which was a birthday present from his father Karl, and which Malone has reportedly played at every gig since he was 21. The third is a Fender American Special with 11-.49 strings, used for performances of "Hold You Back". The Mayson acoustics are a DM5SCE and an MS7SCE, both with LR Baggs Anthem pickups.

== Personal life ==
Malone married Jessica his long-term partner on 29 February 2020, and the pair have four daughters. When not touring, he works as a project engineer for a system integration company, and, according to the band's official website, enjoys running, swimming and sightseeing, and is a supporter of football team Chelsea F.C.
