= Voyager (English band) =

English rock band

- Origin: Newbury, Berkshire
- Genres: Pop; rock; pop rock; progressive rock (early)
- Members: Paul French; Paul Hirsh; Dominic Telfer; John "Martyr" Marter
- Past members: Chris Hook

Voyager were an English pop/rock band, made up of Paul French, Paul Hirsh, Chris Hook, and John "Martyr" Marter. Dominic Telfer later replaced Hook.

== Formation and main history ==
They formed initially in Newbury, Berkshire as The Paul French Connection with Paul French (vocals, keyboards), Paul Hirsh (keyboards, guitar), Chris Hook (bass guitar), and former member of Mr. Big, John "Martyr" Marter (drums).

Although they initially saw themselves as a progressive rock group, they had to tailor their style to a more commercial mood, as evidenced by their debut single, "Halfway Hotel". It was their only hit single, reaching No. 33 in the UK Singles Chart, No. 15 in the Australian Kent Music Report Singles Chart in 1979 and duly becoming the title track of their first album.

A second album Act of Love (1980) yielded a turntable hit (heavily played on music radio without ever entering the charts), "Sing Out (Love Is Easy)". Part of the instrumental section of the single was used for some time thereafter as background music for the chart run down on BBC Radio 1 each week.

A third album Voyager, followed in 1981 and featured Dominic Telfer on bass guitar, replacing Chris Hook. A single from this album, "Rosie", achieved some radio play but no chart success.

In 1981, they undertook two key tours, promoting the third album. The first tour was in support of the Greg Lake Band (ex Emerson, Lake & Palmer). During December 1981 the band supported the Electric Light Orchestra on the UK leg of their world "Time" tour. They played the Royal Highland Exhibition Centre at Ingliston near Edinburgh, Wembley Arena and Birmingham NEC.

== Breakup ==
In the absence of further chart success, they subsequently disbanded. A compilation, Travels in Time - The Best of the Early Years, was issued on CD in 2004, containing digitally remastered versions of thirteen songs from the first two albums, plus a previously unreleased track, "Time On Our Side". All three of the first albums, mastered from the vinyls, have now been released on CD by the Japanese record label, Air Mail Recordings.

Marter later joined Marillion, then Alaska, and since 1994 has played with the SAS Band, a loose conglomeration of musicians and singers led by Spike Edney, former keyboard player on stage with Queen. He and Hook have also worked with The Purple Project, a Deep Purple tribute band as well as the Yes tribute act, Fragile, while Hook also plays with Bluefish and with Ultimate Elton and the Rocket Band, a UK Elton John tribute group. Hirsh temporarily joined Status Quo for live performances in 2000, whilst their regular keyboard player and guitarist Andy Bown took a break for personal reasons. French went on to compose classical pieces premiered at the Wigmore Hall by the ensemble Endymion, and composed production music in various styles for Chappell Music Library.

== Reform ==
In 2006, Voyager reunited to record another album, Eyecontact. However, their lack of further chart success leave them labeled as one-hit wonders.

== Discography ==
=== Studio albums ===
List of albums, with selected details and chart positions
Title	Album details	Peak chart positions
Title	Album details	AUS
Halfway Hotel	Released: 1979; Format: LP; Label: Mountain (TOPS124)	15
Act of Love	Released: 1980; Format: LP; Label: Mountain (TOPS127)	—
Voyager	Released: 1981; Format: LP, cassette; Label: RCA (RCALP 5020)	—
Eyecontact	Released: 2006; Format: CD, download; Label: Leadhead (LEAD002)	—

=== Compilation albums ===
Title	Album details
Travels in Time (The Best of the Early Years)	Released: 2004; Format: CD, download; Label: Leadhead (LEAD001)
Rest in Rock	Released: 2013; Format: CD, download; Label: Leadhead (LEAD003)

=== Singles ===
List of singles, with chart positions
Year	Title	Peak chart positions	
Year	Title	UK	AUS
1979	"Halfway Hotel"	33	15
1979	"Judas"	—	93
1979	"Total Amnesia"	—	—
1980	"Keeping the Music Alive"	—	—
1980	"Sing Out – Love Is Easy"	—	—
1980	"Cling to Me"	—	—
1981	"King of Siam"	—	—
1981	"Rosie"	—	—
1982	"Like a Stone"	—	—
1999	"Time Travel"	93	—

== See also ==
- List of performers on Top of the Pops
