= Rock 'til You Drop =

Studio album by Status Quo
- Released: 23 September 1991
- Recorded: at Bray Studios & ARSIS Studios
- Genre: Hard rock
- Length: 75:56
- Label: Vertigo
- Producer: Francis Rossi

Status Quo chronology
Rocking All Over the Years (1990)	Rock 'til You Drop (1991)	Live Alive Quo (1992)

Professional ratings
Review scores
Source	Rating
Metal Hammer	1/5 stars

Rock 'til You Drop is the twentieth studio album by British rock band Status Quo and their last on the Vertigo label after nearly 20 years. Singer and guitarist Francis Rossi produced the album.

"Rossi is particularly fond of 1991's Rock 'til You Drop," reported Classic Rock a decade later. "Guitarist Rick Parfitt hates the record."

The album closes with a version of "Forty Five Hundred Times" that's one verse and three minutes longer than the Hello! original. "We were trying to make the song current for that incarnation of the band," said Rossi. "Whether or not we were successful in that… well, probably not. Musically speaking, it will have been tidier than the original – the playing would have improved. But, as we discovered on the Frantic Four's 2013 reunion tour, that's not really what it's all about. After doing it live again three years later, we went 'What the fuck's this extra verse all about?' – and we got rid of it."

== Track listing ==
1. "Like a Zombie" (Francis Rossi, Bernie Frost) 5:03
2. "All We Really Wanna Do" (Francis Rossi, Bernie Frost) 3:47
3. "Fakin' the Blues" (Francis Rossi, Bernie Frost) 4:29
4. "One Man Band" (Rick Parfitt, Pip Williams) 4:31
5. "Rock 'til You Drop" (Andy Bown) 3:21
6. "Can't Give You More" (Francis Rossi, Bob Young) 4:27
7. "Warning Shot" (Andy Bown, John Edwards) 3:58
8. "Let's Work Together" (Wilbert Harrison) 3:41
9. "Bring It On Home" (Sam Cooke) 3:10
10. "No Problems" (Francis Rossi, Rick Parfitt) 4:51
11. "Good Sign" (Rick Parfitt, Pip Williams) 4:15 *
12. "Tommy" (Francis Rossi, Bernie Frost) 3:50 *
13. "Nothing Comes Easy" (Francis Rossi, Rick Parfitt, Andy Bown, John Edwards, Jeff Rich) 5:46 *
14. "Fame or Money" (Francis Rossi, Andy Bown) 4:06 *
15. "The Price of Love" (Don Everly, Phil Everly) 3:39 *
16. "Forty Five Hundred Times" (Francis Rossi, Rick Parfitt) 12:56 *

* Not on LP version.

== Personnel ==
Status Quo

- Francis Rossi - vocals, lead guitar
- Rick Parfitt - vocals, rhythm guitar
- Andy Bown - keyboards, piano
- John Edwards - bass guitar
- Jeff Rich - drums

== Charts ==
Chart (1991)	Peak position
Swedish Albums (Sverigetopplistan)	22
Swiss Albums (Schweizer Hitparade)	18
UK Albums (Official Charts)	10

Chart (2020)	Peak position
Scottish Albums (Official Charts)	46
