= Christmas in the Sun =

Single by Rolf Harris and Rick Parfitt

from the album It's Christmas Time
- Released: 7 December 2009
- Recorded: 2009
- Genre: Christmas music Rock
- Length: 3:11
- Label: Universal Music
- Songwriters: Rick Parfitt; Hal Shaper; Andy Bown; Rolf Harris
- Producer: Wolfgang Birnbacher

Rick Parfitt singles chronology
"It's Christmas Time" (2008)	"Christmas in the Sun" (2009)

"Christmas in the Sun" is a Christmas song by Rolf Harris and Rick Parfitt that was released in 2009. It was included in the compilation box set album It's Christmas Time. The single was released on 7 December 2009 and it was written by Parfitt, Harris, Hal Shaper, and Andy Bown.

Harris said the song took 20 years to write and was inspired by memories of growing up in Western Australia in the 1930s (in the Southern Hemisphere, December 25 falls during the summer season). The final chorus features lyrics from "Whatever You Want", a song by Parfitt's band Status Quo.

The proceeds of digital download sales and four Christmas in the Sun paintings by Harris were donated to the Australian charity The Smith Family.

It is not to be confused with the documentary Christmas Under the Sun.

== Track listing ==
1. "Christmas in the Sun" (3:11)

Another original Christmas song entitled Christmas in the Sun was written, recorded and copyrighted in 1983. A version of this song, sung by Leonard Tucker, was released several years later. The author/composer of this original Christmas Song provides a story behind the song in his own words: "Growing up in NYC, I always associated Christmas with cold or snowy weather. Moving to San Diego in 1983, I appreciated the beautiful weather. But, when the Christmas season came and it was still beach weather, I was confused, maybe a little sad, and certainly inspired to write this song. It features the vocals of my generous and talented friend, leonard Tucker, who has his own unique style but is on the same level as Johnny Mathis! With no snow or ice on Christmas Day, even I began to ask myself 'Is Santa Claus Real or Not?'"

== Charts ==
Chart (2009)	Position
UK Singles Chart	25
