= Rockin' All Over the World (album) =

1977 album by Status Quo

Studio album by Status Quo
- Released: 11 November 1977
- Genre: Hard rock
- Length: 45:19
- Labels: Vertigo (UK); Capitol (US)
- Producer: Pip Williams

Status Quo chronology
| Live! (1977) | Rockin' All Over the World (1977) | If You Can't Stand the Heat... (1978) |

Singles from Rockin' All Over the World
- 1. "Rockin' All Over the World" Released: 30 September 1977; 2. "Rockers Rollin'" / "Hold You Back" Released: 1977 (EU)

Professional ratings
Review scores
| Source | Rating |
|---|---|
| AllMusic | 3.5/5 stars |
| Christgau's Record Guide | B+ |

Rockin' All Over the World is the tenth studio album by British rock band Status Quo. It is their first to be produced by Pip Williams. Released in November 1977, it reached number 5 in the UK.

"A poxy album," said guitarist and singer Francis Rossi. "There's nothing poxy about Rockin' All Over the World," countered guitarist Rick Parfitt. "It's fucking great. Pip added some class into the production and, from then onwards, we got quite posh – for us." Uncharacteristically, bassist Alan Lancaster agreed with Rossi: "When Pip Williams started producing us was when everything started to go wrong."

The title track, written and originally recorded by John Fogerty, was released as a single in September 1977, peaking at number 3 in the UK. Its b-side was "Ring of a Change", from their previous studio album Blue for You. No other singles were issued from the album, although "Can't Give You More" was re-recorded by the band for 1991's Rock 'Til You Drop and issued as a single, reaching #37.

The album was reissued by Mercury in 2005 with a bonus track: a cover of the Beatles' "Getting Better", initially recorded in 1976 for the soundtrack of the film All This and World War II. This track was omitted from a deluxe edition released in late 2015; however, for this reissue, the entire album was remixed and reordered by original engineer John Eden. Several of the new mixes feature longer play-outs and the overall sound was stripped back to the core of two guitars, bass and drums, with occasional keyboard parts. As a further bonus, four demos were included.

== Track listing ==
The original album release included the tracks:

Side one

1. "Hard Time" (Francis Rossi, Rick Parfitt) – 4:45
2. "Can't Give You More" (Rossi, Bob Young) – 4:15
3. "Let's Ride" (Alan Lancaster) – 3:03
4. "Baby Boy" (Rossi, Young) – 3:12
5. "You Don't Own Me" (Lancaster, Mick Green) – 3:03
6. "Rockers Rollin'" (Parfitt, Jackie Lynton) – 4:19

Side two

1. "Rockin' All Over the World" (John Fogerty) – 3:36
2. "Who Am I" (Pip Williams, Peter Hutchins) – 4:30
3. "Too Far Gone" (Lancaster) – 3:08
4. "For You" (Parfitt) – 3:01
5. "Dirty Water" (Rossi, Young) – 3:51
6. "Hold You Back" (Rossi, Parfitt, Young) – 4:30

=== 2005 remaster bonus track ===
1. "Getting Better" (Lennon/McCartney) – 2:19

=== 2015 deluxe edition bonus tracks: John Eden Remix ===
1. "Hold You Back" - 5:10
2. "Baby Boy" - 3:18
3. "Rockers Rollin'" - 4:41
4. "Who am I?" - 5:10
5. "Rockin' All Over the World" - 3:50
6. "Dirty Water" - 4:16
7. "Can't Give You More" - 5:26
8. "Let's Ride" - 3:04
9. "For You" - 3:08
10. "Too Far Gone" - 3:09
11. "You Don't Own Me" - 3:29
12. "Hard Time" - 4:39
13. "Dirty Water" (1st Demo 1976) - 4:16
14. "Baby Boy" (1st Demo 1976) - 2:49
15. "Hard Time" (1st Demo 1976) - 4:47
16. "Hold You Back" (Studio Demo 1977) - 3:40

== Personnel ==
Credits from Discogs and SoundOnSound.

Status Quo

- Francis Rossi – lead vocals, lead guitar, rhythm guitar
- Rick Parfitt – rhythm guitar, additional lead guitar on "Rockin' All Over the World", lead vocals on "Roller's Rollin" & "For You"
- Alan Lancaster – bass guitar, lead vocals on "Let's Ride" "You Dont Own Me" & "Too Far Gone"
- John Coghlan – drums

Additional personnel

- Andy Bown – backing vocals, keyboards, piano, Hammond organ
- Frank Ricotti – percussion
- Pip Williams – producer, slide guitar on "Rockin' All Over the World"
- John Eden – engineer

== Charts ==
=== Weekly charts ===
| Chart (1977–78) | Peak position |
|---|---|
| Australian Albums (Kent Music Report) | 14 |
| Austrian Albums (Ö3 Austria) | 24 |
| Finnish Albums (The Official Finnish Charts) | 18 |
| French Albums (SNEP) | 8 |
| Dutch Albums (Album Top 100) | 9 |
| German Albums (Offizielle Top 100) | 7 |
| New Zealand Albums (RMNZ) | 29 |
| Norwegian Albums (VG-lista) | 16 |
| Swedish Albums (Sverigetopplistan) | 19 |
| UK Albums (Official Charts) | 5 |

=== Year-end charts ===
| Chart (1978) | Position |
|---|---|
| German Albums (Offizielle Top 100) | 38 |

== Certifications ==
| Region | Certification | Certified units/sales |
|---|---|---|
| Australia (ARIA) | 2× Platinum | 100,000^{^} |
| France (SNEP) | Gold | 100,000^{*} |
| Germany (BVMI) | Gold | 250,000^{^} |
| Spain (Promusicae) | Platinum | 100,000^{^} |
| Switzerland (IFPI Switzerland) | Gold | 25,000^{^} |
| United Kingdom (BPI) | Gold | 100,000^{‡} |
^{*} Sales figures based on certification alone.^{^} Shipments figures based on certification alone.^{‡} Sales+streaming figures based on certification alone.
