= Marguerita Time =

Single by Status Quo

from the album Back to Back
- Released: 2 December 1983
- Genre: Pop rock
- Length: 3:27
- Label: Vertigo
- Songwriter: Rossi/Frost
- Producer: Status Quo

Status Quo singles chronology
"A Mess of Blues" (1983)	"Marguerita Time" (1983)	"Going Down Town Tonight" (1984)

Official audio
- "Marguerita Time" on YouTube

"Marguerita Time" is a 1983 song by the British rock band Status Quo. It was the third track to be released as a single from their 1983 album Back to Back. The single was also issued as a limited edition picture disc, and in a Christmas double pack that included "Caroline"/"Joanne". The single became one of the band's biggest hits, peaking at no. 3 on the UK Singles Chart and was later certified Silver by the BPI for sales in excess of 250,000 copies.

Bassist Alan Lancaster recalled "Nobody but Francis [Rossi] wanted to record it. All it did was advertise that we were a bunch of nerds". Lancaster refused to appear in the band's video for the song. When the band mimed the song on BBC's Top of the Pops, on one occasion Lancaster's place was taken by Slade's Jim Lea.

The song was reprised, in 2014, for the band's 31st studio album Aquostic – Stripped Bare. It was featured in the ninety-minute launch performance for the album at London's Roundhouse on 22 October, broadcast live by BBC Radio 2 as part of their In Concert series.

Dexys Midnight Runners covered the song on the B-side of their single "This Is What She's Like". This recording was included on some reissues of that band's Too-Rye-Ay album.

== Track listing ==
1. "Marguerita Time" (Rossi/Frost) (3.27)
2. "Resurrection" (Bown/Parfitt) (3.46)

== Charts ==
Chart (1983–1984)	Peak position
Germany (GfK)	52
Ireland (IRMA)	7
Netherlands (Single Top 100)	35
Switzerland (Schweizer Hitparade)	23
UK Singles (OCC)	3

== Certifications ==
Region	Certification	Certified units/sales
United Kingdom (BPI)	Silver	250,000^{^}
^{^} Shipments figures based on certification alone.
