= Rick Parfitt =

British rock musician (1948–2016)

Rick Parfitt OBE
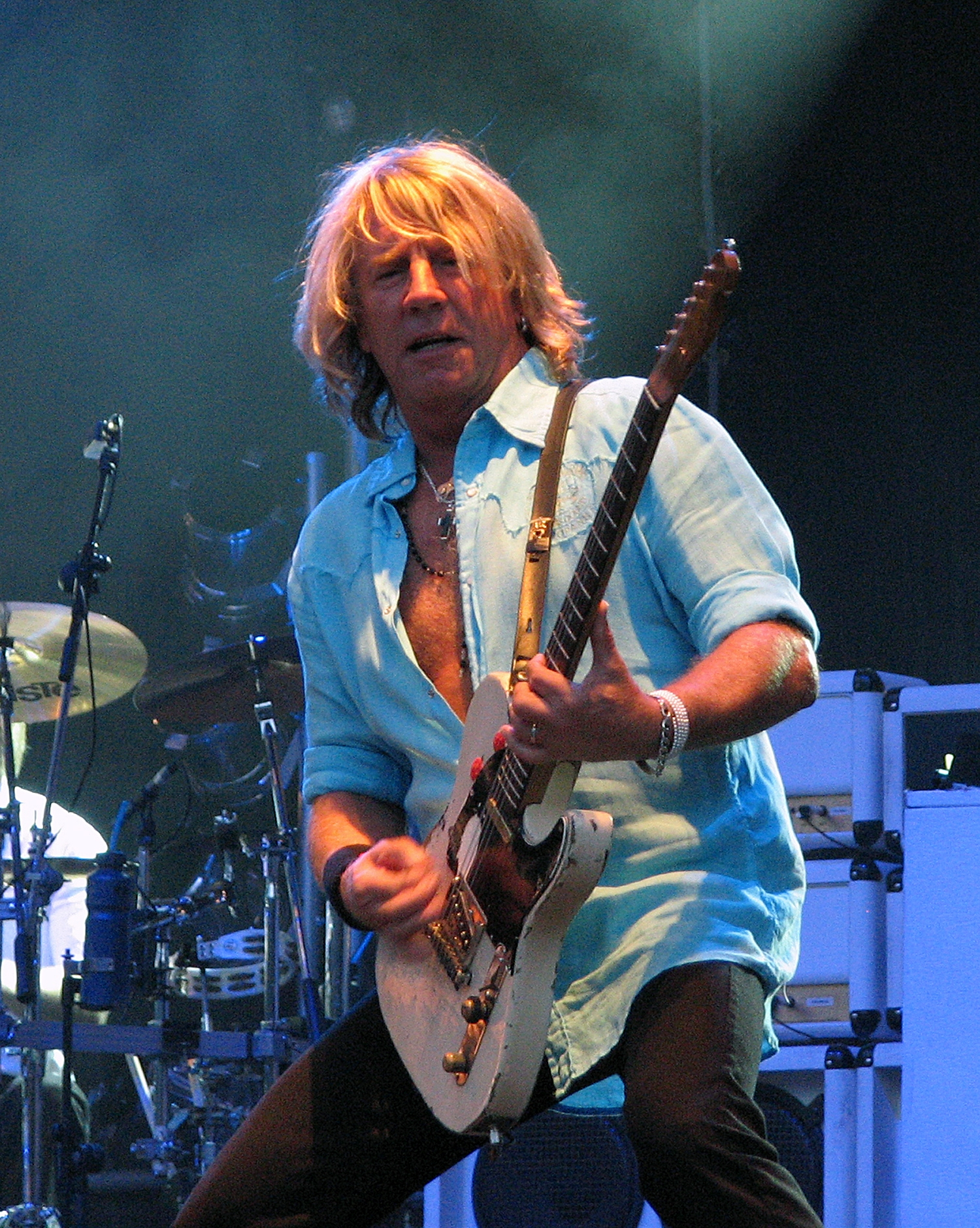
- Parfitt performing with Status Quo in 2007

Background information
- Born: Richard John Parfitt; 12 October 1948; Woking, Surrey, England
- Died: 24 December 2016 (aged 68) Marbella, Spain
- Genres: Rock; boogie rock; hard rock
- Occupations: Musician, songwriter
- Instruments: Guitar, vocals
- Years active: 1964–2016
- Formerly of: Status Quo

Richard John Parfitt (12 October 1948 – 24 December 2016) was an English musician, best known as a rhythm guitarist, singer and songwriter with rock band Status Quo.

Parfitt began his career in the early 1960s, playing in pubs and holiday camps. He joined Status Quo in 1967 when they were looking for an additional singer. He wrote songs for the band and remained with them for 49 years. Parfitt occasionally guested with other bands, and recorded an unreleased solo album in 1985. In 2016, Parfitt temporarily retired from touring with the band due to ill health; he died in December of that year. His only solo album, Over and Out, was released posthumously in 2018.

== Early life ==
Richard John Parfitt was born in Woking, Surrey, on 12 October 1948. His father Richard was an insurance salesman "who was a drinker and a gambler", and his mother Lillian worked in cake shops. He described his upbringing as "wonderful", and described his childhood-self as a "typical naughty boy". He first started to learn to play the guitar at the age of 11.

== Career ==
=== Early career ===
In 1963 Parfitt was playing guitar and singing in The Prince of Wales Feathers, a pub on Warren Street in Camden, London, when his father was approached by an agent from Sunshine Holiday Camp on Hayling Island, who gave Parfitt a performing job. At the camp Parfitt joined Jean and Gloria Harrison – performing as the double act The Harrison Twins – to form a cabaret trio called The Highlights. Following the season, the Harrison Twins' manager Joe Cohen – who had been one of the Keystone Cops – arranged for The Highlights to perform at Butlins in Minehead. Here, Parfitt met future Status Quo partner Francis Rossi, who was playing with Alan Lancaster and John Coghlan in a band called The Spectres (soon to be renamed Traffic Jam) – a forerunner to Status Quo. "I remember wandering over there one afternoon for the first time and watching them rehearse," Parfitt recalled. "I may still have been in my silver lamé suit, which I used to wear all the time. They were playing [Chuck Berry's] 'Bye Bye Johnny' and it sounded absolutely fantastic."

After Parfitt befriended the band, their manager Pat Barlow invited him to join, as they needed another singer.

=== Status Quo ===
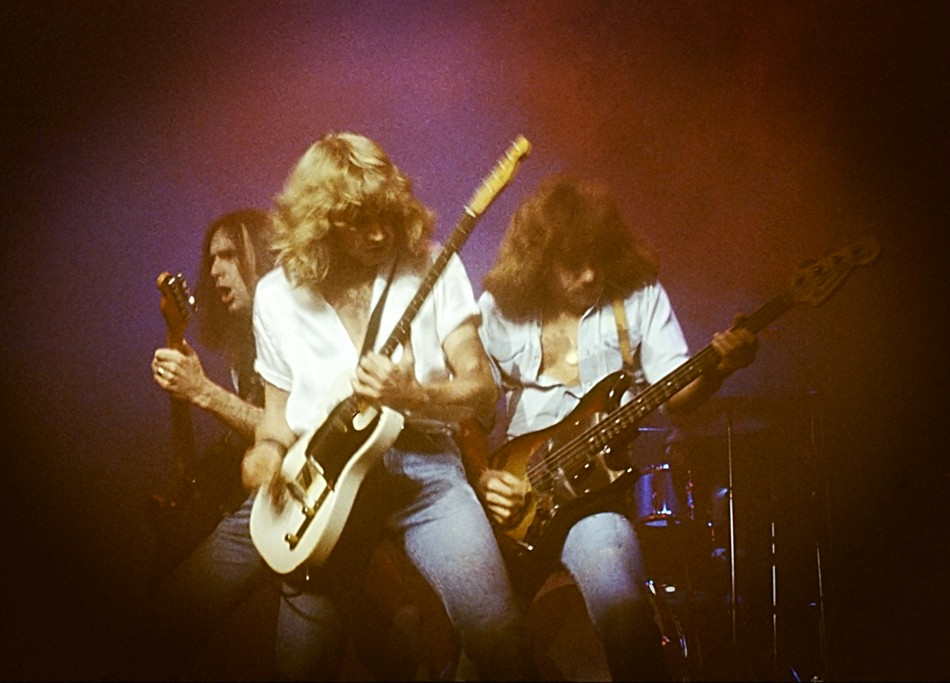
Parfitt (centre) with Status Quo in 1978

In 1967, Traffic Jam changed their name to The Status Quo (they soon dropped the definite article and later still would often be known simply as 'Quo'), beginning Parfitt's almost 50-year career in the band. Early successes came with the Rossi-penned hit "Pictures of Matchstick Men". The single became the group's only Top 40 hit in the United States, peaking at number twelve on the Billboard Hot 100. Though the follow-up was the unsuccessful single, "Black Veils of Melancholy", they had a hit again the same year with a Marty Wilde and Ronnie Scott song, "Ice in the Sun", which climbed to number eight. The band's 1972 album Piledriver, which reached number 5, spent a total of 37 weeks on the UK Albums Chart.

The band's more popular songs during the early 1970s include "Paper Plane" (no 42 in the German music chart) (1972), "Caroline" (no 36 in the German music chart) (1973), "Down Down" (no 14 in the Austrian music chart) (1975), "Rain" (no 27 in the German music chart) (1976), "Rockin' All Over the World" (No 29 in the New Zealand music chart) (1977) and "Whatever You Want" (no 24 in the Australian Music Chart) (1979). "Down Down" topped the UK Singles Chart in January 1975, becoming their only UK number one single to date. In 1976, they signed a pioneering sponsorship deal with Levi's.

The 1976 hit "Mystery Song", co-written with Bob Young, was composed after Rossi had laced Parfitt's tea with amphetamine sulphate during the sessions for the Blue for You album. Rossi later said: "He was playing the riff when we left the studio, and he was still playing it when we came back the next day!"

Quo were highly successful in Europe, Japan, Australia and New Zealand throughout the 1980s and 90s, and were the opening act for 1985's Live Aid, and they continued to be successful to the present day. By February 2015 they had sold over 118 million records worldwide. In 2013 and 2014, Parfitt and Rossi reunited temporarily with original Quo bandmates Alan Lancaster and John Coghlan for a series of reunion concerts on what would be called the "Frantic Four" tour.

Parfitt and Rossi were appointed Officers of the Order of the British Empire (OBE) in the New Year Honours 2010.

At the time of Parfitt's death, he was the longest lasting member of Status Quo aside from Francis Rossi; who co-founded the band in 1962. He wrote some of their greatest hits, also in collaboration with the group's keyboard player Andy Bown, among them "Whatever You Want", "Again and Again", and "Rain".

=== Solo endeavours and other projects ===
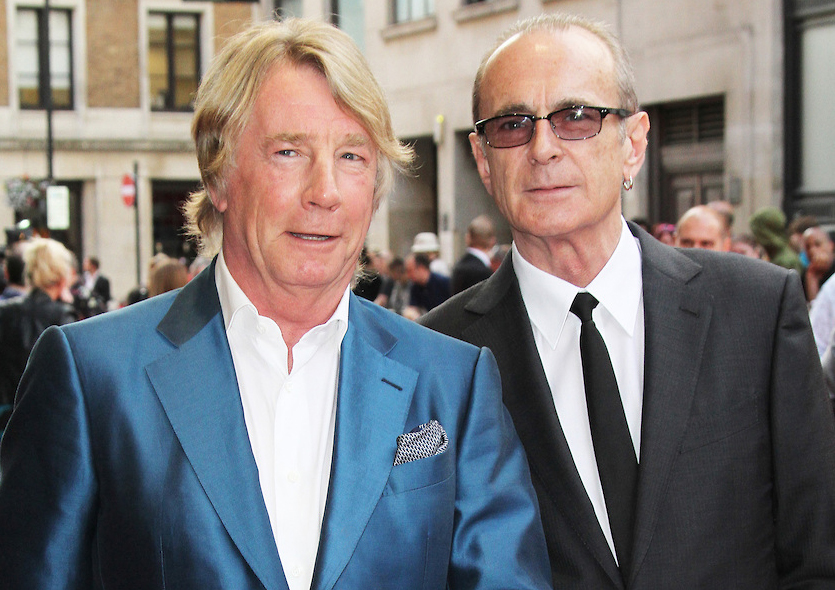
Parfitt and Francis Rossi in 2013 at the premiere of Bula Quo!

In 1984, the year before Quo would open Live Aid, Parfitt and Rossi appeared on the Band Aid charity single, "Do They Know It's Christmas?". Bob Geldof asked Parfitt and Rossi to take part, knowing that although the group were from an entirely different musical era and background, their consistent chart success and fame would bring a certain amount of credibility to the project from the rock fraternity and ensure that the group's loyal following of fans (the "Quo Army") would support the cause and buy the record in large numbers.

Parfitt played guitar on the song "It's an Illusion" recorded for the 1984 album Strange Frontier by Roger Taylor.

Parfitt wrote and recorded a solo album Recorded Delivery in 1985, but it was never released. Among the musicians on the record were bassist John "Rhino" Edwards and drummer Jeff Rich, formerly with the Climax Blues Band and Judie Tzuke. Edwards and Rich were subsequently invited by Parfitt to join Status Quo.

In 2006 Parfitt released his guitar refacing overlay invention, the "guitar facelift", which was licensed by guitar manufacturer Fender.

In December 2009, Parfitt teamed up with Rolf Harris for the single "Christmas in the Sun", following on from the 2008 Status Quo hit "It's Christmas Time" which Parfitt wrote with Wayne Morris.

In 2013, Parfitt and Rossi starred as themselves in Bula Quo!, a comedy film in which the duo find themselves becoming accidentally involved with mafia operations on Fiji. The film was generally poorly-received by critics. An album was released alongside the film.

In April 2015, in partnership with Julian Hall and his wife Lyndsay, Parfitt set up "Status Homes", a real estate company based in Marbella, Spain.

On 1 December 2017, a press release from the earMusic record label on Status Quo's website announced that Over and Out, a solo album planned by Parfitt, would be released posthumously on 23 March 2018. Parfitt had worked on the album during his hiatus from the band following a heart attack in 2016, completing vocal and guitar tracks, but dying before he had had an opportunity to produce it. Guest musicians helping to complete the album included Brian May of Queen, Chris Wolstenholme of Muse, former Status Quo bassist Alan Lancaster and current bassist John "Rhino" Edwards and co-produced by Parfitt's son Rick Parfitt Jnr. The album entered the UK charts in its first week of release at number 3 and the German album charts at number 10.

== Musical equipment ==
One of Parfitt's guitars, the one synonymous with his legendary image was a white 1965 Fender Telecaster. Prior to acquiring this instrument, he played a late 1967 Fender Custom Telecaster in Ice Blue Metallic finish, with a rosewood fretboard. In his career, he also played a Gibson SG Junior, a 1981 Zemaitis tuned to a B, a Schecter Telecaster, a Fender Esquire, a custom-made Fender Telecaster Thinline, a Gibson Melody Maker and a Chet Atkins acoustic guitar. He also used Status Slipstream guitars in different configurations. For amplification, Parfitt used Marshall JCM800kk (Kerry King signature) or JCM900 amplifiers with 4x12 cabinets, combined with VOX AC30 amplifiers and a Roland GP8 signal processor and a Boss GE-7 as his clean boost pedal.

== Personal life ==
=== Drugs, alcohol and health issues ===
Following a heart attack, Parfitt had a quadruple heart bypass in 1997, when he was told by doctors that he could die "at any time" unless he changed his lifestyle of drugs, smoking and heavy drinking. At the height of the band's fame, Parfitt and his long-time Status Quo partner Francis Rossi were notorious for drinking and drug use, with Parfitt claiming to have been spending up to £1,000 a week on cocaine, and up to £500 a week on vodka. In his later life, following several health issues, Parfitt led a more sober life, stating in a 2014 interview that he had not smoked cannabis for 27 years and had not used cocaine for 10 years.

He had a throat cancer scare in December 2005. He suffered a heart attack in December 2011 and underwent surgery on the following day.

On 1 August 2014, while on a European tour with Status Quo, Parfitt was hospitalised in Pula, Croatia, forcing the cancellation of six shows on the tour. He had suffered a heart attack while on his tour bus after performing a concert in Austria, and had a stent inserted.

On 14 June 2016, after playing with the band in Antalya, Turkey, he suffered another heart attack and was hospitalised again. His management described his condition as serious. Parfitt was clinically dead for several minutes, resulting in mild cognitive impairments. The band announced that their ongoing tour would continue with Freddie Edwards, son of bassist John "Rhino" Edwards, as a temporary replacement. On 22 June it was announced that Parfitt had been flown home to the UK and was described as "comfortable" in hospital in London, where he was undergoing more tests. He had a defibrillator fitted into his chest. In September 2016 it was announced that he would not be well enough to tour in the autumn, and he did not intend to tour with the band for the foreseeable future.

=== Family and relationships ===
In 1973, Parfitt married his first wife, Marietta Boeker, and in 1974 they had their first son, Richard, better known as Rick Parfitt Jr., a sports car racer and musician. The couple also had a daughter, Heidi, who drowned in the family swimming pool at the age of two.

This tragedy, combined with Parfitt's alcohol abuse and cocaine habit, led to the couple divorcing. Parfitt was linked romantically to Page 3 girl and glamour model Debee Ashby in the mid-1980s. He went on to marry his second wife and former girlfriend, Patty Beeden, in 1988. They had a son, Harry, in 1989. They divorced eight years later in 1996 when Rick Parfitt had an affair with Marietta Boeker. Patty wrote a book about their life together in 1998 entitled Laughing All Over the World: My Life Married to Status Quo.

Parfitt subsequently became engaged to fitness instructor Lyndsay Whitburn, whom he married in 2006 after a three-month courtship. The couple remained married for the remainder of Parfitt's life, and had twins Tommy and Lily in 2008, although by the time of Parfitt's death, the couple had been separated for several months.

== Death and tributes ==
Parfitt died in a Marbella hospital at lunchtime on 24 December 2016 from sepsis, after being admitted on Thursday evening, 22 December, following an infection of a pre-existing shoulder injury. His funeral was held at Woking Crematorium on 19 January 2017.

Following the news of his death, friends and associates of the band took to social media to express their condolences. Among these were Brian May of Queen, the Who, Peter Frampton and broadcaster Chris Tarrant, on whose show – Tiswas – Status Quo had appeared. Former and current bandmates including drummer Jeff Rich also offered condolences. A tribute page dedicated to Parfitt appeared on the band's official website including messages from Francis Rossi and manager Simon Porter, as well as on the website of former Quo drummer John Coghlan. Coghlan personally paid tribute to Parfitt at a concert with his spin-off band, John Coghlan's Quo, at The Half Moon, Putney on 30 December 2016, during which he read out a poem by a fan entitled The Rhythm King.

In June 2017, a blue plaque to Parfitt was unveiled on Jubilee Square, in his hometown of Woking. Among the attendees were Coghlan, and Parfitt's son Rick Parfitt Jr.
