= Pictures – 40 Years of Hits =

Compilation album by Status Quo
- Released: 10 November 2008
- Genre: Rock, boogie rock, hard rock, heavy metal, blues rock
- Label: Universal
- Producer: various

Status Quo chronology
In Search of the Fourth Chord (2007)	Pictures – 40 Years of Hits (2008)	Pictures – Live at Montreux (2009)

Alternative cover
- Earbook boxset cover

Professional ratings
Review scores
Source	Rating
AllMusic	4/5 stars
BBC Music	favourable

Pictures – 40 Years of Hits is a compilation album by the British rock band Status Quo, and was released on 10 November 2008. The album was available as a standard double CD, a double CD+DVD deluxe edition, and the four-CD earbook boxset, containing the single versions of all 76 Status Quo singles (including five singles in collaboration with other acts) from 1968 to 2008 inclusive, housed in a box that included a 120-page booklet and reproduction prints of fifty versions of Status Quo single and album covers recreated by famous musicians and celebrities. The original artwork was later auctioned off to raise money for the Prince's Trust, a charity Status Quo has long supported.

== Track listing ==
=== Disc 1 ===
1. "Pictures of Matchstick Men" – 3:09
2. "Ice in the Sun" – 2:10
3. "Down the Dustpipe" – 2:02
4. "In My Chair" – 3:13
5. "Paper Plane" – 2:58
6. "Mean Girl" – 3:36
7. "Caroline" – 3:47
8. "Break the Rules" – 3:38
9. "Down Down" – 3:51
10. "Roll Over Lay Down" (live) – 5:41
11. "Rain" – 4:34
12. "Mystery Song" – 3:59
13. "Wild Side of Life" – 3:16
14. "Rockin' All Over the World" – 3:34
15. "Again and Again" – 3:40
16. "Whatever You Want" – 3:48
17. "Living on an Island" – 3:48
18. "What You're Proposing" – 3:52
19. "Lies" – 3:54
20. "Don't Drive My Car" – 4:13

=== Disc 2 ===
1. "Something 'Bout You Baby I Like" – 2:39
2. "Rock 'n' Roll" – 3:50
3. "Dear John" – 3:11
4. "Ol' Rag Blues" – 2:46
5. "A Mess of Blues" – 3:20
6. "Marguerita Time" – 3:20
7. "The Wanderer" – 3:21
8. "Rollin' Home" – 3:58
9. "Red Sky" – 4:10
10. "In the Army Now" – 3:40
11. "Ain't Complaining" – 3:58
12. "Burning Bridges (On and Off and On Again)" – 3:51
13. "The Anniversary Waltz – Part One" – 5:32
14. "I Didn't Mean It" – 3:22
15. "Fun, Fun, Fun" (with The Beach Boys) – 3:03
16. "Jam Side Down" – 3:28
17. "You'll Come 'Round" – 3:24
18. "The Party Ain't Over Yet" – 3:51
19. "Beginning of the End" – 3:17
20. "It's Christmas Time" – 4:11
- On the Australian and New Zealand releases, "Ol' Rag Blues" was omitted and the track "Jump That Rock (Whatever You Want)" by Scooter vs. Status Quo was included at the end of disc 2 instead.

== Deluxe edition ==
Discs 1 and 2 as standard edition.

=== DVD track listing ===
1. Interview with Francis Rossi – 28:04
2. Interview with Rick Parfitt – 24:10
3. "Running All Over the World" – 3:35
4. "Can't Give You More" – 3:43
5. "Rock 'Til You Drop"
6. "Sherri Don't Fail Me Now" – 2:50
7. "Restless" – 4:10
8. "I Didn't Mean It" – 3:24
9. "The Way It Goes" – 3:18
10. "Jam Side Down" – 3:31
11. "You'll Come 'Round" – 3:22
12. "Thinking of You" – 3:37
13. "The Party Ain't Over Yet" – 4:21
14. "Beginning of the End" – 3:19
15. "Jump That Rock (Whatever You Want)" – 3:25

== 4-CD "earBOOK" track listing ==
=== Disc 1 ===
No.	Title	Length
1.	"Pictures of Matchstick Men"
2.	"Black Veils of Melancholy"
3.	"Ice in the Sun"
4.	"Make Me Stay a Bit Longer"
5.	"Are You Growing Tired of My Love"
6.	"The Price of Love"
7.	"Down the Dustpipe"
8.	"In My Chair"
9.	"Tune to the Music"
10.	"Paper Plane"
11.	"Mean Girl"
12.	"Gerdundula"
13.	"Caroline"
14.	"Break the Rules"
15.	"Down Down"
16.	"Roll Over Lay Down (live)"
17.	"Rain"
18.	"Mystery Song"
19.	"Wild Side of Life"

=== Disc 2 ===
No.	Title	Length
1.	"Rockin' All Over the World"
2.	"Again and Again"
3.	"Accident Prone"
4.	"Whatever You Want"
5.	"Living on an Island"
6.	"What You're Proposing"
7.	"Lies"
8.	"Don't Drive My Car"
9.	"Something 'Bout You Baby, I Like"
10.	"Rock n' Roll"
11.	"Dear John"
12.	"She Don't Fool Me"
13.	"Caroline (live)"
14.	"Ol' Rag Blues"
15.	"A Mess of Blues"
16.	"Marguerita Time"
17.	"Going Down Town Tonight"

=== Disc 3 ===
No.	Title	Length
1.	"The Wanderer"
2.	"Rollin' Home"
3.	"Red Sky"
4.	"In the Army Now"
5.	"Dreamin'"
6.	"Ain't Complaining"
7.	"Who Gets the Love?"
8.	"Running All Over the World"
9.	"Burning Bridges (On and Off and On Again)"
10.	"Not at All"
11.	"Little Dreamer"
12.	"The Anniversary Waltz – Part One"
13.	"The Anniversary Waltz – Part Two"
14.	"Can't Give You More"
15.	"Rock 'Til You Drop"
16.	"Roadhouse Medley (Anniversary Waltz – Part 25)"
17.	"Fakin' the Blues"
18.	"I Didn't Mean It"

=== Disc 4 ===
No.	Title	Length
1.	"Sherri, Don't Fail Me Now!"
2.	"Restless"
3.	"When You Walk in the Room"
4.	"Fun, Fun, Fun" (Status Quo with the Beach Boys)
5.	"Don't Stop"
6.	"All Around My Hat" (Status Quo and Maddy Prior from Steeleye Span)
7.	"The Way It Goes"
8.	"Little White Lies"
9.	"Twenty Wild Horses"
10.	"Mony Mony"
11.	"Old Time Rock 'n' Roll"
12.	"Jam Side Down"
13.	"All Stand Up (Never Say Never)"
14.	"You'll Come 'Round"
15.	"Thinking of You"
16.	"The Party Ain't Over Yet"
17.	"All That Counts Is Love"
18.	"Beginning of the End"
19.	"It's Christmas Time"
20.	"Come On You Reds" (Manchester United Football Squad and Status Quo)
21.	"We're Gonna Do It Again" (Manchester United Football Squad with Status Quo featuring Stryker)
22.	"Jump That Rock! (Whatever You Want)" (Scooter vs. Status Quo)

== Charts ==
=== Weekly charts ===
Chart (2008–2009)	Peak position
Scottish Albums (OCC)	10
Swedish Albums (Sverigetopplistan)	2
UK Albums (OCC)	8

=== Year-end charts ===
Chart (2008)	Position
UK Albums (OCC)	72

== Certifications ==
Region	Certification	Certified units/sales
United Kingdom (BPI)	Gold	100,000^{^}
^{^} Shipments figures based on certification alone.
