= Live at the BBC (Status Quo album) =

Live album by Status Quo
- Released: 24 October 2010
- Recorded: 1966–2005
- Genre: Rock
- Label: Universal Music Group

Status Quo chronology
Pictures – Live at Montreux (2009)	Live at the BBC (2010)	Quid Pro Quo (2011)

Live at the BBC is series of releases by English rock band Status Quo, issued by Universal Music on 24 October 2010. The release was available in three versions: a 2-CD set, a 4-CD box set, and a limited edition 7-CD+1-DVD box set. The DVD was also available individually.

== Content ==
Representing the last set of unreleased recordings in the Status Quo catalogue, the collection was collated not just from all of the BBC-owned Status Quo recordings that still existed in the archive, but also by inviting contributions from fans. Fans contributed home recordings of broadcasts that were wiped by BBC. The set includes recordings of the band's early appearances as The Spectres and Traffic Jam.

== Track listing ==
=== 2-CD ===
Disc one
No.	Title	Recording	Length
1.	"Gloria" (The Spectres)	Saturday Club 10/9/66	2:42
2.	"I (Who Have Nothing)" (The Spectres)	Saturday Club 10/9/66	3:03
3.	"Almost But Not Quite There" (Traffic Jam)	Saturday Club 24/6/67	2:38
4.	"Judy in Disguise" (Status Quo)	David Symonds - recorded 16/1/68, transmitted 22/1/68	2:45
5.	"Pictures of Matchstick Men" (Status Quo)	David Symonds - recorded 16/1/68, transmitted 22/1/68	3:06
6.	"Black Veils of Melancholy" (Status Quo)	David Symonds - recorded 29/3/68	3:14
7.	"Ice in the Sun" (Status Quo)	David Symonds - Saturday Club 30/7/68	2:14
8.	"The Price of Love" (Status Quo)	Symonds on Sunday - recorded 27/1/69	3:29
9.	"Down the Dustpipe" (Status Quo)	Dave Lee Travis - recorded 6/4/70	1:55
10.	"In My Chair" (Status Quo)	Dave Lee Travis - recorded 6/4/70	2:47
11.	"Mean Girl" (Status Quo)	Sounds of the Seventies - recorded 7/2/72, transmitted 3/3/72	3:12
12.	"Paper Plane" (Status Quo)	Sounds of the Seventies - recorded 20/11/72, transmitted 7/12/72; programme number 00YJ3738	2:59
13.	"From a Jack to a King" (Status Quo)	Steve Wright - 30/11/89	1:00
14.	"Railroad" (Status Quo)	Steve Wright - 30/11/89	1:57
15.	"Caroline" (Status Quo)	Ken Bruce - 9/9/05	4:50
16.	"Whatever You Want" (Status Quo)	Ken Bruce - 9/9/05	4:55
17.	"Rockin All Over the World" (Status Quo)	Ken Bruce - 9/9/05	3:59
Total length:			50:75

Disc two
No.	Title	Recording	Length
1.	"Junior's Wailing" (Status Quo)	Paris Theatre, recorded 1/3/73 (in concert)	3:37
2.	"In My Chair" (Status Quo)	Paris Theatre, recorded 1/3/73 (in concert)	3:14
3.	"Don't Waste My Time" (Status Quo)	Paris Theatre, recorded 1/3/73 (in concert)	4:34
4.	"Paper Plane" (Status Quo)	Paris Theatre, recorded 1/3/73 (in concert)	3:36
5.	"Bye Bye Johnny" (Status Quo)	Paris Theatre, recorded 1/3/73 (in concert)	5:11
6.	"Whatever You Want" (Status Quo)	Wembley Arena, recorded 7/7/88 (in concert)	4:55
7.	"Roll Over Lay Down" (Status Quo)	Wembley Arena, recorded 7/7/88 (in concert)	5:17
8.	"Who Gets the Love?" (Status Quo)	Wembley Arena, recorded 7/7/88 (in concert)	4:26
9.	"Don't Drive My Car" (Status Quo)	Wembley Arena, recorded 7/7/88 (in concert)	4:09
10.	"In The Army Now" (Status Quo)	Wembley Arena, recorded 7/7/88 (in concert)	4:15
11.	"Burning Bridges" (Status Quo)	Sutton Park, Birmingham, recorded 30/8/92	3:54
12.	"Caroline" (Status Quo)	Sutton Park, Birmingham, recorded 30/8/92	4:03
13.	"The Wanderer" (Status Quo)	Brighton Centre - 12/12/96	3:08
14.	"Don't Waste My Time" (Status Quo)	Brighton Centre - 12/12/96	3:51
15.	"Rockin All Over The World" (Status Quo)	Brighton Centre - 12/12/96	3:47
Total length:			61:95

=== 4-CD ===
Disc One: In Session
No.	Title	Recording	Length
1.	"Gloria" (The Spectres)	Saturday Club 10/9/66
2.	"I (Who Have Nothing)" (The Spectres)	Saturday Club 10/9/66
3.	"Neighbour Neighbour" (The Spectres)	Saturday Club 10/9/66
4.	"I Don't Want You" (Traffic Jam)	Saturday Club 24/6/67
5.	"Almost But Not Quite There" (Traffic Jam)	Saturday Club 24/6/67
6.	"Spicks and Specks" (Traffic Jam)	Saturday Club 24/6/67
7.	"Spicks and Specks" (Status Quo)	David Symonds - recorded 16/1/68, transmitted 22/1/68
8.	"Judy in Disguise" (Status Quo)	David Symonds - recorded 16/1/68, transmitted 22/1/68
9.	"Pictures of Matchstick Men" (Status Quo)	David Symonds - recorded 16/1/68, transmitted 22/1/68
10.	"Things Get Better" (Status Quo)	Saturday Club - recorded 13/2/68, transmitted 17/2/68
11.	"Pictures Of Matchstick Men" (Status Quo)	Saturday Club - recorded 13/2/68, transmitted 17/2/68
12.	"Gloria" (Status Quo)	David Symonds - recorded 29/3/68
13.	"Bloodhound" (Status Quo)	David Symonds - recorded 29/3/68
14.	"Black Veils of Melancholy" (Status Quo)	David Symonds - recorded 29/3/68
15.	"Ice in the Sun" (Status Quo)	Saturday Club - recorded 30/7/68
16.	"Paradise Flats" (Status Quo)	Saturday Club - recorded 30/7/68
17.	"When My Mind Is Not Life" (Status Quo)	Saturday Club - recorded 30/7/68
18.	"Make Me Stay aa Bit Longer" (Status Quo)	Symonds on Sunday - recorded 27/1/69
19.	"Are You Growing Tired of My Love" (Status Quo)	Symonds on Sunday - recorded 27/1/69
20.	"The Price of Love" (Status Quo)	Symonds on Sunday - recorded 27/1/69
21.	"Price of My Love" (Status Quo)	Symonds on Sunday - recorded 27/1/69
22.	"Junior's Wailing" (Status Quo)	Dave Lee Travis - recorded 6/4/70
23.	"Spinning Wheel Blues" (Status Quo)	Dave Lee Travis - recorded 6/4/70
24.	"Down the Dustpipe" (Status Quo)	Dave Lee Travis - recorded 6/4/70
25.	"In My Chair" (Status Quo)	Dave Lee Travis - recorded 6/4/70

Disc Two: In Session (con't)
No.	Title	Recording	Length
1.	"Need Your Love" (Status Quo)	Dave Lee Travis - recorded 15/6/70
2.	"Mean Girl" (Status Quo)	Sounds of the Seventies - recorded 7/2/72, transmitted 3/3/72
3.	"Railroad" (Status Quo)	Sounds of the Seventies - recorded 7/2/72, transmitted 3/3/72
4.	"Don't Waste My Time" (Status Quo)	Sounds of the Seventies - recorded 20/11/72, transmitted 7/12/72
5.	"Oh Baby" (Status Quo)	Sounds of the Seventies - recorded 20/11/72, transmitted 7/12/72
6.	"Unspoken Words" (Status Quo)	Sounds of the Seventies - recorded 20/11/72, transmitted 7/12/72
7.	"Paper Plane" (Status Quo)	Sounds of the Seventies - recorded 20/11/72, transmitted 7/12/72
8.	"Softer Ride" (Status Quo)	Sounds of The Seventies - recorded 20/11/72, transmitted 7/12/72
9.	"Paper Plane" (Status Quo)	John Peel - recorded 8/1/73, transmitted 16/1/73
10.	"Softer Ride" (Status Quo)	John Peel - recorded 8/1/73, transmitted 16/1/73
11.	"Don't Waste My Time" (Status Quo)	John Peel - recorded 8/1/73, transmitted 16/1/73
12.	"In My Chair" (Status Quo)	Steve Wright - 30/11/89
13.	"Caroline" (Status Quo)	Steve Wright - 30/11/89
14.	"From a Jack to a King" (Status Quo)	Steve Wright - 30/11/89
15.	"Down the Dustpipe" (Status Quo)	Steve Wright - 30/11/89
16.	"Railroad" (Status Quo)	Steve Wright - 30/11/89
17.	"Caroline" (Status Quo)	Ken Bruce - 9/9/05
18.	"The Party Ain't Over Yet" (Status Quo)	Ken Bruce - 9/9/05
19.	"Whatever You Want" (Status Quo)	Ken Bruce - 9/9/05
20.	"Belavista Man" (Status Quo)	Ken Bruce - 9/9/05
21.	"Rockin All Over the World" (Status Quo)	Ken Bruce - 9/9/05

Disc Three: Concerts
No.	Title	Recording	Length
1.	"Junior's Wailing" (Status Quo)	Paris Theatre, recorded 1/3/73 (in concert)
2.	"Someone's Learning" (Status Quo)	Paris Theatre, recorded 1/3/73 (in concert)
3.	"In My Chair" (Status Quo)	Paris Theatre, recorded 1/3/73 (in concert)
4.	"Railroad" (Status Quo)	Paris Theatre, recorded 1/3/73 (in concert)
5.	"Don't Waste My Time" (Status Quo)	Paris Theatre, recorded 1/3/73 (in concert)
6.	"Paper Plane" (Status Quo)	Paris Theatre, recorded 1/3/73 (in concert)
7.	"Roadhouse Blues" (Status Quo)	Paris Theatre, recorded 1/3/73 (in concert)
8.	"Bye Bye Johnny" (Status Quo)	Paris Theatre, recorded 1/3/73 (in concert)
9.	"Whatever You Want" (Status Quo)	Wembley Arena, recorded 7/7/88 (in concert)
10.	"Little Lady" (Status Quo)	Wembley Arena, recorded 7/7/88 (in concert)
11.	"Roll Over Lay Down" (Status Quo)	Wembley Arena, recorded 7/7/88 (in concert)
12.	"Cream of the Crop" (Status Quo)	Wembley Arena, recorded 7/7/88 (in concert)
13.	"Don't Drive My Car" (Status Quo)	Wembley Arena, recorded 7/7/88 (in concert)
14.	"In the Army Now" (Status Quo)	Wembley Arena, recorded 7/7/88 (in concert)

Disc Four: Concerts (con't)
No.	Title	Recording	Length
1.	"Burning Bridges" (Status Quo)	Sutton Park, Birmingham, recorded 30/8/92
2.	"Rockin All Over The World" (Status Quo)	Sutton Park, Birmingham, recorded 30/8/92
3.	"Roadhouse Blues/The Wanderer/Marguerita Time/Living on an Island/Break the Rules/Somethin' 'Bout You Baby I Like/The Price of Love/Roadhouse Blues" (Status Quo)	Sutton Park, Birmingham, recorded 30/8/92
4.	"Caroline" (Status Quo)	Sutton Park, Birmingham, recorded 30/8/92
5.	"The Wanderer" (Status Quo)	Brighton Centre - 12/12/96
6.	"Proud Mary" (Status Quo)	Brighton Centre - 12/12/96
7.	"The Wild Side of Life/Again & Again/Slow Train" (Status Quo)	Brighton Centre - 12/12/96
8.	"Get Back" (Status Quo)	Brighton Centre - 12/12/96
9.	"Somethin' 'Bout You Baby I Like" (Status Quo)	Brighton Centre - 12/12/96
10.	"Don't Waste My Time" (Status Quo)	Brighton Centre - 12/12/96
11.	"Rockin All Over the World" (Status Quo)	Brighton Centre - 12/12/96
12.	"Caroline" (Status Quo)	Brighton Centre - 12/12/96
13.	"All Around My Hat" (Status Quo with Maddy Prior)	Brighton Centre - 12/12/96

=== 7-CD + 1-DVD ===
Disc One: In Session
No.	Title	Recording	Length
1.	"Gloria" (The Spectres)	Saturday Club 10/9/66
2.	"I (Who Have Nothing)" (The Spectres)	Saturday Club 10/9/66
3.	"Neighbour Neighbour" (The Spectres)	Saturday Club 10/9/66
4.	"Bloodhound" (The Spectres)	Saturday Club 10/9/66
5.	"Bird Dog" (The Spectres)	Saturday Club 10/9/66
6.	"I Don't Want You" (Traffic Jam)	Saturday Club 24/6/67
7.	"Almost But Not Quite There" (Traffic Jam)	Saturday Club 24/6/67
8.	"Spicks and Specks" (Traffic Jam)	Saturday Club 24/6/67
9.	"It Takes Two" (Traffic Jam)	Saturday Club 24/6/67
10.	"Spicks and Specks" (Status Quo)	David Symonds - recorded 16/1/68, transmitted 22/1/68
11.	"Judy in Disguise" (Status Quo)	David Symonds - recorded 16/1/68, transmitted 22/1/68
12.	"Pictures of Matchstick Men" (Status Quo)	Saturday Club - 17/2/68
13.	"Things Get Better" (Status Quo)	Saturday Club - recorded 13/2/68, transmitted 17/2/68
14.	"Pictures of Matchstick Men" (Status Quo)	Saturday Club - recorded 13/2/68, transmitted 17/2/68
15.	"Gloria" (Status Quo)	David Symonds - recorded 29/3/68
16.	"Bloodhound" (Status Quo)	David Symonds - recorded 29/3/68
17.	"Black Veils of Melancholy" (Status Quo)	David Symonds - recorded 29/3/68
18.	"Ice in the Sun" (Status Quo)	Saturday Club - recorded 30/7/68
19.	"Paradise Flats" (Status Quo)	Saturday Club - recorded 30/7/68
20.	"When My Mind Is Not Life" (Status Quo)	Saturday Club - recorded 30/7/68
21.	"Make Me Stay a Bit Longer" (Status Quo)	Symonds on Sunday - recorded 27/1/69
22.	"Are You Growing Tired of My Love" (Status Quo)	Symonds on Sunday - recorded 27/1/69
23.	"The Price of Love" (Status Quo)	Symonds on Sunday - recorded 27/1/69
24.	"The Price of Love" (Status Quo)	Symonds on Sunday - recorded 31/3/69
25.	"Junior's Wailing" (Status Quo)	Tony Brandon Show 18/8/69 as featured on Top of the Pops transcription disc #251
26.	"Spinning Wheel Blues" (Status Quo)	Dave Lee Travis - recorded 6/4/70
27.	"Down the Dustpipe" (Status Quo)	Dave Lee Travis - recorded 6/4/70
28.	"In My Chair" (Status Quo)	Dave Lee Travis - recorded 6/4/70

Disc Two: In Session (con't)
No.	Title	Recording	Length
1.	"Need Your Love" (Status Quo)	Dave Lee Travis - recorded 15/6/70
2.	"Mean Girl" (Status Quo)	Sounds of the Seventies - recorded 7/2/72, transmitted 3/3/72
3.	"Railroad" (Status Quo)	Sounds of the Seventies - recorded 7/2/72, transmitted 3/3/72
4.	"Don't Waste My Time" (Status Quo)	Sounds of the Seventies - recorded 20/11/72, transmitted 7/12/72
5.	"Oh Baby" (Status Quo)	Sounds of the Seventies - recorded 20/11/72, transmitted 7/12/72
6.	"Unspoken Words" (Status Quo)	Sounds of the Seventies - recorded 20/11/72, transmitted 7/12/72
7.	"Paper Plane" (Status Quo)	Sounds of the Seventies - recorded 20/11/72, transmitted 7/12/72
8.	"Softer Ride" (Status Quo)	Sounds of the Seventies - recorded 20/11/72, transmitted 7/12/72
9.	"Paper Plane" (Status Quo)	John Peel - recorded 8/1/73, transmitted 16/1/73
10.	"Softer Ride" (Status Quo)	John Peel - recorded 8/1/73, transmitted 16/1/73
11.	"Don't Waste My Time" (Status Quo)	John Peel - recorded 8/1/73, transmitted 16/1/73
12.	"In My Chair" (Status Quo)	Steve Wright - 30/11/89
13.	"Caroline" (Status Quo)	Steve Wright - 30/11/89
14.	"From a Jack to a King" (Status Quo)	Steve Wright - 30/11/89
15.	"Down the Dustpipe" (Status Quo)	Steve Wright - 30/11/89
16.	"Railroad" (Status Quo)	Steve Wright - 30/11/89
17.	"Caroline" (Status Quo)	Ken Bruce - 9/9/05
18.	"The Party Ain't Over Yet" (Status Quo)	Ken Bruce - 9/9/05
19.	"Whatever You Want" (Status Quo)	Ken Bruce - 9/9/05
20.	"Belavista Man" (Status Quo)	Ken Bruce - 9/9/05
21.	"Rockin All Over the World" (Status Quo)	Ken Bruce - 9/9/05

Disc Three: Concerts
No.	Title	Recording	Length
1.	"Junior's Wailing" (Status Quo)	Paris Theatre, recorded 1/3/73 (in concert)
2.	"Someone's Learning" (Status Quo)	Paris Theatre, recorded 1/3/73 (in concert)
3.	"In My Chair" (Status Quo)	Paris Theatre, recorded 1/3/73 (in concert)
4.	"Railroad" (Status Quo)	Paris Theatre, recorded 1/3/73 (in concert)
5.	"Don't Waste My Time" (Status Quo)	Paris Theatre, recorded 1/3/73 (in concert)
6.	"Paper Plane" (Status Quo)	Paris Theatre, recorded 1/3/73 (in concert)
7.	"Roadhouse Blues" (Status Quo)	Paris Theatre, recorded 1/3/73 (in concert)
8.	"Bye Bye Johnny" (Status Quo)	Paris Theatre, recorded 1/3/73 (in concert)
9.	"Caroline" (Status Quo)	NEC Birmingham - recorded 14/5/82
10.	"Roll Over Lay Down" (Status Quo)	NEC Birmingham - recorded 14/5/82
11.	"Backwater" (Status Quo)	NEC Birmingham - recorded 14/5/82
12.	"Little Lady" (Status Quo)	NEC Birmingham - recorded 14/5/82
13.	"Don't Drive My Car" (Status Quo)	NEC Birmingham - recorded 14/5/82

Disc Four: Concerts (con't)
No.	Title	Recording	Length
1.	"Whatever You Want" (Status Quo)	NEC Birmingham - recorded 14/5/82
2.	"Hold You Back" (Status Quo)	NEC Birmingham - recorded 14/5/82
3.	"Rockin All Over the World" (Status Quo)	NEC Birmingham - recorded 14/5/82
4.	"Over the Edge" (Status Quo)	NEC Birmingham - recorded 14/5/82
5.	"Don't Waste My Time" (Status Quo)	NEC Birmingham - recorded 14/5/82
6.	"Dirty Water" (Status Quo)	NEC Birmingham - recorded 14/5/82
7.	"Forty Five Hundred Times" (Status Quo)	NEC Birmingham - recorded 14/5/82
8.	"Big Fat Mama" (Status Quo)	NEC Birmingham - recorded 14/5/82
9.	"Roadhouse Blues" (Status Quo)	NEC Birmingham - recorded 14/5/82
10.	"Rain" (Status Quo)	NEC Birmingham - recorded 14/5/82
11.	"Down Down" (Status Quo)	NEC Birmingham - recorded 14/5/82
12.	"Bye Bye Johnny" (Status Quo)	NEC Birmingham - recorded 14/5/82

Disc Five: Concerts (con't)
No.	Title	Recording	Length
1.	"Whatever You Want" (Status Quo)	Wembley Arena - recorded 7/7/88
2.	"Little Lady" (Status Quo)	Wembley Arena - recorded 7/7/88
3.	"Roll Over Lay Down" (Status Quo)	Wembley Arena - recorded 7/7/88
4.	"Cream of the Crop" (Status Quo)	Wembley Arena - recorded 7/7/88
5.	"Who Gets the Love?" (Status Quo)	Wembley Arena - recorded 7/7/88
6.	"Hold You Back" (Status Quo)	Wembley Arena - recorded 7/7/88
7.	"Don't Drive My Car" (Status Quo)	Wembley Arena - recorded 7/7/88
8.	"Dirty Water" (Status Quo)	Wembley Arena - recorded 7/7/88
9.	"In the Army Now" (Status Quo)	Wembley Arena - recorded 7/7/88
10.	"Rockin All Over the World" (Status Quo)	Wembley Arena - recorded 7/7/88
11.	"Don't Waste My Time" (Status Quo)	Wembley Arena - recorded 7/7/88
12.	"Bye Bye Johnny" (Status Quo)	Wembley Arena - recorded 7/7/88

Disc Six: Concerts (con't)
No.	Title	Recording	Length
1.	"Whatever You Want" (Status Quo)	Sutton Park, Birmingham, recorded 30/8/92
2.	"In The Army Now" (Status Quo)	Sutton Park, Birmingham, recorded 30/8/92
3.	"Burning Bridges" (Status Quo)	Sutton Park, Birmingham, recorded 30/8/92
4.	"Rockin All Over the World" (Status Quo)	Sutton Park, Birmingham, recorded 30/8/92
5.	"Caroline" (Status Quo)	Sutton Park, Birmingham, recorded 30/8/92
6.	"Roadhouse Blues/The Wanderer/Marguerita Time/Living on an Island/Break the Rules/Somethin' 'Bout You Baby I Like/The Price of Love/Roadhouse Blues" (Status Quo)	Sutton Park, Birmingham, recorded 30/8/92

Disc Seven: Concerts (con't)
No.	Title	Recording	Length
1.	"Paper Plane" (Status Quo)	Brighton Centre - 12/12/96
2.	"The Wanderer" (Status Quo)	Brighton Centre - 12/12/96
3.	"Proud Mary" (Status Quo)	Brighton Centre - 12/12/96
4.	"The Wild Side of Life/Again & Again/Slow Train" (Status Quo)	Brighton Centre - 12/12/96
5.	"Get Back" (Status Quo)	Brighton Centre - 12/12/96
6.	"Whatever You Want" (Status Quo)	Brighton Centre - 12/12/96
7.	"In The Army Now" (Status Quo)	Brighton Centre - 12/12/96
8.	"Somethin' 'Bout You Baby I Like" (Status Quo)	Brighton Centre - 12/12/96
9.	"Don't Waste My Time" (Status Quo)	Brighton Centre - 12/12/96
10.	"Rockin All Over the World" (Status Quo)	Brighton Centre - 12/12/96
11.	"Roadhouse Blues" (Status Quo)	Brighton Centre - 12/12/96
12.	"Caroline" (Status Quo)	Brighton Centre - 12/12/96
13.	"All Around My Hat" (with Maddy Prior)	Brighton Centre - 12/12/96

Disc Eight: DVD
No.	Title	Recording	Length
1.	"Caroline" (Status Quo)	NEC Birmingham - recorded 14/5/82
2.	"Roll Over Lay Down" (Status Quo)	NEC Birmingham - recorded 14/5/82
3.	"Backwater" (Status Quo)	NEC Birmingham - recorded 14/5/82
4.	"Little Lady" (Status Quo)	NEC Birmingham - recorded 14/5/82
5.	"Don't Drive My Car" (Status Quo)	NEC Birmingham - recorded 14/5/82
6.	"Whatever You Want" (Status Quo)	NEC Birmingham - recorded 14/5/82
7.	"Hold You Back" (Status Quo)	NEC Birmingham - recorded 14/5/82
8.	"Rockin All Over the World" (Status Quo)	NEC Birmingham - recorded 14/5/82
9.	"Dirty Water" (Status Quo)	NEC Birmingham - recorded 14/5/82
10.	"Down Down" (Status Quo)	NEC Birmingham - recorded 14/5/82
11.	"Don't Waste My Time" (Status Quo)	NEC Birmingham - recorded 14/5/82
12.	"Pictures of Matchstick Men" (Status Quo)	Top of the Pops - 15/2/1968
13.	"Caroline" (Status Quo)	Top of the Pops - 27/9/1973
14.	"Down Down" (Status Quo)	Top of the Pops - 23/12/1975
15.	"Mystery Song" (Status Quo)	Top of the Pops - 15/7/1976
16.	"What You're Proposing" (Status Quo)	Top of the Pops - 9/10/1980
17.	"Rock 'n' Roll" (Status Quo)	Top of the Pops - 17/12/1981
18.	"Dear John" (Status Quo)	Top of the Pops - 1/4/1982
19.	"The Wanderer" (Status Quo)	Top of the Pops - 25/10/1984
20.	"Rollin' Home" (Status Quo)	Top of the Pops - 15/5/1986
21.	"Red Sky" (Status Quo)	Top of the Pops - 7/8/1986
22.	"In the Army Now" (Status Quo)	Top of the Pops - 2/10/1986
23.	"Dreamin'" (Status Quo)	Top of the Pops - 1/1/1987
24.	"Let's Stick Together" (Status Quo)	Top of the Pops - 3/10/1991
25.	"Jam Side Down" (Status Quo)	Top of the Pops - 16/8/2002
26.	"Rockin All Over the World" (Status Quo)	Top of the Pops - 13/9/2002
27.	"The Party Ain't Over Yet" (Status Quo)	Top of the Pops - 18/9/2005
28.	"Interview" (Francis Rossi and Rick Parfitt)	Old Grey Whistle Test - 1977
29.	"A Mess of Blues" (Status Quo)	Saturday Superstore - 19/11/1983
30.	"Marguerita Time" (Status Quo)	The Little and Large Show - 5/1/1984
31.	"Rockin All Over the World" (Status Quo)	Wogan - 28/8/1991
32.	"Old Time Rock n Roll" (Status Quo)	Jim Davidson Presents - 7/7/2000
33.	"Roadhouse Medley" (Status Quo)	Live from Amsterdam - 1/10/2002
34.	"Rock 'til You Drop" (Status Quo)	Pebble Mill - 13/1/1992
35.	"Medley (Caroline/Down Down/Whatever You Want/Rockin All Over The World)" (Status Quo)	The Generation Game - 12/11/1998

== Charts ==
Chart performance for Live at the BBC
Chart (2010)	Peak position
UK Rock & Metal Albums (OCC)	14
