= Accept No Substitute! The Definitive Hits =

Greatest hits album by Status Quo
- Released: November 2015
- Genre: Rock
- Label: Universal

Status Quo chronology
Aquostic – Live at the Roundhouse (2015)	Accept No Substitute! The Definitive Hits (2015)	Aquostic II – That's a Fact! (2016)

Accept No Substitute! The Definitive Hits is a compilation album by British rock band Status Quo released in 2015. A DVD collection, Accept No Substitute! The Definitive Hits and More, was also released.

== Track listing ==
=== Disc 1 ===
1. Pictures Of Matchstick Men 3:08
2. Ice in the Sun 2:10
3. Down the Dustpipe 2:02
4. In My Chair 3:14
5. Mean Girl 3:58
6. Gerdundula 3:49
7. Don't Waste My Time 4:22
8. Big Fat Mama 5:56
9. Paper Plane 3:00
10. Claudie 4:05
11. Caroline 4:19
12. Softer Ride 4:02
13. Forty Five Hundred Times 9:54
14. Break The Rules 3:41
15. Little Lady 3:02
16. Down Down 5:25
17. Roll Over Lay Down (Live) 5:42

=== Disc 2 ===
1. Rain 4:37
2. Mystery Song (single version) 4:00
3. Wild Side of Life 3:18
4. Rockin' All Over The World 3:37
5. Dirty Water 3:51
6. Hold You Back 4:31
7. Again And Again 3:43
8. Whatever You Want 4:02
9. Living on an Island 3:48
10. What You're Proposing 4:18
11. Rock 'n' Roll 3:50
12. Something 'Bout You Baby I Like 2:59
13. Marguerita Time 3:30
14. The Wanderer 3:28
15. Red Sky 4:15
16. Burning Bridges 4:20
17. The Anniversary Waltz (Part 1) 5:30
18. The Way It Goes 4:02

=== Disc 3 ===
1. Jam Side Down 3:27
2. Blues And Rhythm 4:29
3. Old Time Rock And Roll 2:57
4. The Party Ain't Over Yet 3:52
5. Beginning Of The End 4:29
6. Two Way Traffic 3:59
7. Rock And Roll And You 3:27
8. In The Army Now (2010) 4:22
9. Looking Out For Caroline 4:00
10. Gogogo 4:17
11. Bula Bula Quo 3:51
12. Backwater (Live) 4:21
13. Just Take Me (Live) 3:33
14. Is There A Better Way (Live) 3:47
15. Blue Eyed Lady (Live) 3:56
16. And It's Better Now (Acoustic) 3:41
17. Don't Drive My Car (Acoustic) 3:10
18. Rock 'til You Drop (Acoustic) 2:48
19. Pictures of Matchstick Men (Acoustic) 3:37

== Charts ==
Chart (2015)	Peak position
UK Albums (OCC)	21

== Certifications ==
Region	Certification	Certified units/sales
United Kingdom (BPI)	Silver	60,000^{‡}
^{‡} Sales+streaming figures based on certification alone.
