= XS All Areas – The Greatest Hits =

XS All Areas - The Greatest Hits

Compilation album by Status Quo
- Released: September 20, 2004
- Genre: Rock
- Length: 157:05
- Label: Universal Music TV

Status Quo chronology
Riffs (2003)	XS All Areas - The Greatest Hits (2004)	The Party Ain't Over Yet (2005)

XS All Areas – The Greatest Hits is an album by British rock band Status Quo, released in September 2004. It is a best-of compilation with two new tracks, "You'll Come 'Round" and "Thinking of You". A DVD collection, also titled XS All Areas – The Greatest Hits, was released on the same day. The album and DVD coincided with the release of band members Francis Rossi and Rick Parfitt's duel autobiography XS All Areas.

== Track listing ==
=== Disc 1 ===
1. "Caroline" (Francis Rossi and Bob Young) 4:18
2. "Down Down" (Francis Rossi and Bob Young) 3:38
3. "Paper Plane" (Francis Rossi and Bob Young) 2:53
4. "Big Fat Mama" (Francis Rossi and Rick Parfitt) 4:52
5. "Roll Over Lay Down" (Francis Rossi, Bob Young, Rick Parfitt, Alan Lancaster and John Coghlan) 5:38
6. "Softer Ride" (Rick Parfitt and Alan Lancaster) 4:02
7. "Don't Waste My Time" (Francis Rossi and Bob Young) 4:19
8. "Little Lady" (Rick Parfitt) 3:02
9. "Mystery Song" (Rick Parfitt and Bob Young) 3:56
10. "Rain" (Rick Parfitt) 4:33
11. "Break the Rules" (Francis Rossi and Bob Young) 3:38
12. "Something 'Bout You Baby I Like" (Richard Supa) 2:39
13. "Hold You Back" (Francis Rossi, Rick Parfitt and Bob Young) 4:29
14. "Rockin' All Over the World" (Fogerty) 3:34
15. "Whatever You Want" (Rick Parfitt and Andy Bown) 4:01
16. "Don't Drive My Car" (Rick Parfitt and Andy Bown) 4:13
17. "Again and Again" (Rick Parfitt, Andy Bown and Lynton) 3:39
18. "Forty Five Hundred Times" (Francis Rossi and Rick Parfitt) 7:40
19. "All Stand Up" (Francis Rossi and Bob Young) 4:10

=== Disc 2 ===
1. "You'll Come 'Round" (Francis Rossi and Bob Young) 3:25
2. "Thinking of You" (Francis Rossi and Bob Young) 3:55
3. "Jam Side Down" (Terry Britten and Charlie Dore) 3:26
4. "Creepin' Up On You" (Rick Parfitt and John "Rhino" Edwards) 5:01
5. "Down the Dustpipe" (Carl Groszman) 2:21
6. "Pictures of Matchstick Men" (Francis Rossi) 3:10
7. "Ice in the Sun" (Marty Wilde and Ronnie Scott) 2:12
8. "In My Chair" (Francis Rossi and Bob Young) 3:10
9. "Gerdundula" (Francis Rossi and Bob Young) 3:20
10. "Wild Side of Life" (Arlie Carter and William Warren) 3:15
11. "Rock 'n' Roll" (Francis Rossi and Bernie Frost) 4:02
12. "What You're Proposing" (Francis Rossi and Bernie Frost) 4:15
13. "The Wanderer" (Ernie Maresca) 3:26
14. "Living on an Island" (Rick Parfitt and Bob Young) 3:45
15. "Marguerita Time" (Francis Rossi and Bernie Frost) 3:27
16. "In the Army Now" (Rob Bolland and Ferdi Bolland) 4:40
17. "When You Walk in the Room" (Jackie DeShannon) 3:02
18. "Burning Bridges" (Francis Rossi and Andy Bown) 4:19
19. "Fun Fun Fun" (Mike Love and Brian Wilson) 4:03
20. "Old Time Rock and Roll" (George Jackson and Thomas E. Jones III) 2:57
21. "The Anniversary Waltz Part 1" (Lee/Kind/Mack/Mendlesohn/Chuck Berry/Ernie Maresca/Dave Bartholomew/King/Albert Collins/Richard Penniman/Hammer/Otis Blackwell) 5:32

== Charts ==
Chart (2004)	Peak position
German Albums (Offizielle Top 100)	84
Scottish Albums (OCC)	25
UK Albums (OCC)	16

== Certifications ==
Region	Certification	Certified units/sales
United Kingdom (BPI)	Gold	100,000^{^}
^{^} Shipments figures based on certification alone.
