= Live! (Status Quo album) =

Live album by Status Quo
- Released: 4 March 1977
- Recorded: 27–29 October 1976
- Venue: Apollo Theatre, Glasgow
- Genre: Hard rock; heavy metal
- Length: 92:14
- Label: Vertigo (UK); Capitol (US)
- Producer: Status Quo assisted by Damon Lyon-Shaw

Status Quo chronology
Blue for You (1976)	Live! (1977)	Rockin' All Over the World (1977)

Live! is the first live album by British rock band Status Quo. The double album is an amalgam of performances at Glasgow's Apollo Theatre between 27 and 29 October 1976, recorded using the Rolling Stones Mobile Studio.

Despite being ranked at number 6 on Classic Rock's list of the 50 Greatest Live Albums Ever, guitarist and singer Francis Rossi has described Live! as "the worst album we ever made", continuing, "I always thought we were better than that. Rick Parfitt and I were left to mix it, and we went through the recordings of the three nights we played, only to pick the first one." Parfitt disagreed, saying, "There are bits of the live album that still give me goosebumps."

"Unlike every other live album from those days, there are absolutely no overdubs on that album. No going back and fixing the bum notes. Nothing other than what we actually put out there on stage at the time. We wanted to prove we weren't like the others: we weren't cheating. But every time I listen to it now, all I can hear are the mistakes. I sit here cringing, thinking, 'I wish we'd put fucking overdubs on.'" – Francis Rossi

The album includes a typically extended version of "Forty Five Hundred Times". "The first part of the song was the song, but we'd make the extra bits up…" recalled Parfitt. "You'd just know when to get softer and then take it somewhere heavier. It was incredible. You'd be swept away by this rollercoaster of music. The only way to end it was to nod, 'Shall we finish it here?'"

== Various issues ==
The original album included the full gig minus the crowd singing "You'll Never Walk Alone" before the encore, but swapped around to accommodate the running times of a double vinyl album. The USA release featured a different album cover. The 2005 remaster by Tim Turan re-sequenced the concert in gig order. In 2014, a box set was released that included the live album plus two additional bonus discs. For this release (remastered by Andy Pearce), the original packaging was adapted to the CD format, and the tracklisting went back to the original vinyl order. The unreleased disc 4 Australia '74 re-used the artwork of the US Live! release.

On 16h May 2025, a "super deluxe edition" was planned for release, including, for the first time, the entire three gigs that were recorded. The first two CDs feature a newly remastered version of the original release, again in the order the songs were played (as on the 2005 remaster). Analysis of these full recordings shows that while the majority of the original album (including the entire second and third side) was indeed taken from the first night, there are also several songs from the second and two from the third night present.

== Track listing ==
Side one

1. "Intro/Junior's Wailing" (Kieran White, Martin Pugh), 5:16 recorded October 28
2. "Backwater/Just Take Me" (Rick Parfitt, Alan Lancaster), 7:39 recorded October 28
3. "Is There a Better Way" (Francis Rossi, Lancaster), 4:30 recorded October 27
4. "In My Chair" (Rossi, Bob Young), 4:00 recorded October 29

Side two

1. "Little Lady/Most of the Time" (Parfitt/Rossi, Young), 7:00 recorded October 27
2. "Forty Five Hundred Times" (Rossi, Parfitt), 16:42 recorded October 27

Side three

1. "Roll Over Lay Down" (Rossi, Parfitt, Lancaster, John Coghlan, Young), 5:59 recorded October 27
2. "Big Fat Mama" (Rossi, Parfitt), 5:10 recorded October 27
3. "Caroline/Bye Bye Johnny" (with drum solo) (Rossi, Young/ Chuck Berry), 12:50 recorded October 27

Side four

1. "Rain" (Parfitt), 4:48 recorded October 29
2. "Don't Waste My Time" (Rossi, Young), 4:08 recorded October 28
3. "Roadhouse Blues" (Jim Morrison, John Densmore, Robby Krieger, Ray Manzarek), 14:12 recorded October 28

== 2005 & 2025 remaster track listing ==
=== Disc 1 ===
1. "Junior's Wailing" (White, Pugh) recorded October 28
2. "Backwater/Just Take Me" (Parfitt, Lancaster) recorded October 28
3. "Is There a Better Way" (Rossi, Lancaster) recorded October 27
4. "In My Chair" (Rossi, Young) recorded October 29
5. "Little Lady/Most of the Time" (Parfitt, Rossi, Young) recorded October 27
6. "Rain" (Parfitt) recorded October 29
7. "Forty-Five Hundred Times" (Rossi, Parfitt) recorded October 27

=== Disc 2 ===
1. "Roll Over Lay Down" (Rossi, Parfitt, Lancaster, Coghlan, Young) recorded October 27
2. "Big Fat Mama" (Rossi, Parfitt) recorded October 27
3. "Don't Waste My Time" (Rossi, Young) recorded October 28
4. "Roadhouse Blues" (Morrison, Densmore, Krieger, Manzarek) recorded October 28
5. "Caroline" (Rossi, Young) recorded October 27
6. "Bye Bye Johnny" (Berry) recorded October 27

== 2014 deluxe edition disc 3: Tokyo Quo ==
1. "Is There a Better Way" (Rossi, Lancaster)
2. "Little Lady" (Parfitt)
3. "Most of the Time" (Rossi, Young)
4. "Rain" (Parfitt)
5. "Caroline" (Rossi, Young)
6. "Roll Over Lay Down" (Rossi, Parfitt, Lancaster, Coghlan, Young)
7. "Big Fat Mama" (Rossi, Parfitt)
8. "Don't Waste My Time" (Rossi, Young)
9. "Bye Bye Johnny" (Berry)

Originally Japan-only live album, recorded at Sunplaza Hall 1976. First international CD release.

== 2014 deluxe edition disc 4: Australia '74 ==
1. "Junior's Wailing" (White, Pugh)
2. "Backwater" (Parfitt, Lancaster)
3. "Just Take Me" (Parfitt, Lancaster)
4. "Claudie" (Rossi, Young)
5. "Railroad" (Rossi, Young)
6. "Roll Over Lay Down" (Rossi, Parfitt, Lancaster, Coghlan, Young)
7. "Big Fat Mama" (Rossi, Parfitt)
8. "Don't Waste My Time" (Rossi, Young)
9. "Roadhouse Blues" Part 1 (Morrison, Densmore, Krieger, Manzarek)
10. "Roadhouse Blues" Part 2 (Morrison, Densmore, Krieger, Manzarek)
11. "Caroline" (Rossi, Young)
12. "Drum Solo" (Coghlan)
13. "Bye Bye Johnny" (Berry)

Soundboard recording from Quo tour. A part of "Roadhouse Blues" is missing.

== Personnel ==
- Francis Rossi - guitar, vocals
- Rick Parfitt - guitar, vocals
- Alan Lancaster - bass, vocals
- John Coghlan - drums

Additional personnel

- Andy Bown - keyboards
- Bob Young - harmonica
- Jackie Lynton as MC, who introduced the band.

== Charts ==
=== Weekly charts ===
Chart (1977)	Peak position
Australian Albums (Kent Music Report)	6
Austrian Albums (Ö3 Austria)	20
Dutch Albums (Album Top 100)	7
German Albums (Offizielle Top 100)	3
New Zealand Albums (RMNZ)	40
Swedish Albums (Sverigetopplistan)	9
UK Albums (OCC)	3

Chart (2014)	Peak position
German Albums (Offizielle Top 100)	39

=== Year-end charts ===
Chart (1977)	Position
Dutch Albums (Album Top 100)	47
German Albums (Offizielle Top 100)	6
UK Albums (OCC)	38

== Certifications ==
Region	Certification	Certified units/sales
Australia (ARIA)	2× Platinum	100,000^{^}
France (SNEP)	Gold	100,000^{*}
Germany (BVMI)	Gold	250,000^{^}
Netherlands (NVPI)	Gold	25,000
Switzerland (IFPI Switzerland)	Gold	25,000^{^}
United Kingdom (BPI)	Gold	100,000^{^}
^{*} Sales figures based on certification alone.^{^} Shipments figures based on certification alone.
