= Quid Pro Quo (album) =

Studio album by Status Quo
- Released: 27 May 2011
- Recorded: 2010–2011
- Studio: ARSIS Studios, Surrey, England
- Genre: Hard rock, blues rock
- Length: 53:15 (UK: 57.08)
- Label: Eagle Rock
- Producer: Francis Rossi, Mike Paxman

Status Quo chronology
Live at the BBC (2010)	Quid Pro Quo (2011)	Bula Quo! (2013)

Singles from Quid Pro Quo
- 1. "In the Army Now (2010)" Released: 26 September 2010; 2. "Rock 'n' Roll 'n' You" Released: 20 April 2011; 3. "Two Way Traffic" Released: 15 August 2011; 4. "Better Than That" Released: 28 November 2011; 5. "Movin' On" Released: 2 January 2012; 6. "The Winner" Released: 9 July 2012

Professional ratings
Review scores
Source	Rating
AllMusic	3/5 stars
BBC	(favourable)
Classic Rock	6/10 stars
MusicOMH	3/5 stars

Quid Pro Quo is the twenty-ninth studio album by British rock band Status Quo, released in May 2011. The album debuted at number 10 in the UK Albums Chart and featured 14 new songs, as well as the 2010 version of their 1986 hit "In the Army Now" which was re-recorded in support of the Help for Heroes and British Forces Foundation charities. The re-recorded version had been issued as a single the previous year. The accompanying Official Live Bootleg album features 12 older songs recorded by the band in concert in Amsterdam and Melbourne in 2010. In the UK the album was only available at branches of Tesco stores for its first week before being released conventionally on the band's Fourth Chord label on 6 June 2011.

The single "Rock 'n' Roll 'n' You" was initially released as a free track download from the band's official website, and was included on BBC Radio 2's 'A' playlist from 14 May 2011 onwards. The album was Radio 2's 'Album Of The Week' for the week commencing 28 May 2011. Subsequent singles "Two Way Traffic", "Better Than That" and "The Winner" were also included on the Radio 2 'A' playlist, and "Movin' On" was placed on the Radio 2 'B' playlist.

== Track listing ==
1. "Two Way Traffic" (Francis Rossi, John Edwards) – 4:00
2. "Rock 'n' Roll 'n' You" (Rossi, Andy Bown) – 3:32
3. "Dust to Gold" (Rossi, Bown, Edwards) – 4:52
4. "Let's Rock" (Rick Parfitt, Wayne Morris) – 4:28
5. "Can't See for Looking" (Parfitt, Bown, Edwards) – 3:55
6. "Better Than That" (Rossi, Bob Young) – 3:18
7. "Movin' On" (Rossi, Young) – 4:05
8. "Leave a Little Light On" (Parfitt, Morris) – 4:05
9. "Any Way You Like It" (Bown, Alan Crook, Edwards) – 3:18
10. "Frozen Hero" (Rossi, Bown) – 4:21
11. "Reality Cheque" (Parfitt, Edwards) – 4:05
12. "The Winner" (Rossi, Young) – 3:18
13. "It's All About You" (Rossi, Young) – 2:54
14. "My Old Ways" (Rossi, Young) – 3:04
15. "In the Army Now" (Rob Bolland, Fred Bolland) (UK release only) – 3:53

== Official Live Bootleg track listing ==
1. "Whatever You Want" (Parfitt, Bown) – 5:12
2. "Down Down" (Rossi, Young) – 5:06
3. "Don't Drive My Car" (Parfitt, Bown) – 3:51
4. "Hold You Back" (Rossi, Young, Parfitt) – 4:38
5. "Pictures of Matchstick Men" (Rossi) – 2:29
6. "Ice in the Sun" (Marty Wilde, Ronnie Scott) – 2:14
7. "Beginning of the End" (Rossi, Edwards) – 4:27
8. "Roll Over Lay Down" (Rossi, Young, Alan Lancaster, Parfitt, John Coghlan) – 5:58
9. "Caroline" (Rossi, Young) – 5:08
10. "Rockin' All Over the World" (John Cameron Fogerty) – 4:07

=== Deluxe Edition bonus tracks ===
11. "Paper Plane" (Rossi, Young) – 3:38
12. "Softer Ride" (Lancaster, Parfitt) – 3:46

== Personnel ==
- Francis Rossi - vocals, lead guitar
- Rick Parfitt - vocals, guitar
- John Edwards - bass, vocals
- Andy Bown - keyboards
- Matt Letley - drums

=== Additional personnel ===
- Bob Young - harmonica on track 13
- Nick Rossi - backing vocals on tracks 2, 6, 7, 12–14
- Kick Horns - horns on track 4
  - Simon Clarke - baritone sax
  - Paul Spong - trumpet
  - Tim Sanders - tenor sax
- Corps of Army Music, Kneller Hall, Twickenham and the voice of WO Eliott Drake on track 15

Recorded at ARSIS Studios 2010–2011

== Charts ==
Chart (2011)	Peak position
Austrian Albums (Ö3 Austria)	26
Belgian Albums (Ultratop Flanders)	61
Belgian Albums (Ultratop Wallonia)	83
Dutch Albums (Album Top 100)	32
French Albums (SNEP)	157
German Albums (Offizielle Top 100)	13
Irish Albums (IRMA)	37
Scottish Albums (OCC)	8
Swedish Albums (Sverigetopplistan)	32
Swiss Albums (Schweizer Hitparade)	8
UK Albums (OCC)	10
UK Independent Albums (OCC)	4

== Certifications ==
Region	Certification	Certified units/sales
United Kingdom (BPI)	Silver	60,000^{^}
^{^} Shipments figures based on certification alone.
