= In the Army Now =

In the Army Now may refer to:

- "In the Army Now" (song), a 1981 song by Rob and Ferdi Bolland, covered by Status Quo, Wess and Sabaton
- In the Army Now (album), a 1986 album by Status Quo
- In the Army Now (film), 1994 war comedy film

== See also ==
- You're in the Army Now (disambiguation)
