= You're in the Army Now (disambiguation) =

You're in the Army Now may refer to:

- You're in the Army Now, 1941 comedy film directed by Lewis Seiler
- O.H.M.S. (film), 1937 British film, known as You're in the Army Now in the US
- "You're in the Army Now" (song), also known as "We're in the Army Now", an American song written in 1917 by Isham Jones with lyrics written by Tell Taylor and Ole Olsen
- "You're in the Army Now" (Bolland & Bolland song), 1982 song by Dutch duo Bolland & Bolland, made famous later by Status Quo as "In the Army Now"

== See also ==
- You're in the Navy Now, 1951 film directed by Henry Hathaway
- In the Army Now (disambiguation)
