= King of the Doghouse =

Studio album by Francis Rossi
- Released: 1996
- Genre: Rock, folk, country
- Length: 40:12
- Label: Virgin Records
- Producer: Tony Macananey

Francis Rossi chronology
King of the Doghouse (1996)	One Step at a Time (2010)

King of the Doghouse is the first solo album by the English singer and guitarist Francis Rossi, frontman of the rock band Status Quo, which was released in 1996. It was recorded between the release of the band's 1996 Don't Stop 30th anniversary covers album and the recording of their 1999 Under the Influence album. The album was not a commercial success.

Rossi later said that he liked the album but wished he had kept control of the production process, since many of the versions and mixes that were eventually chosen were not the "right" ones according to him.

Most of the songs have been written by Tony McAnaney, although some of Rossi's own songs were presented. McAnaney is renowned for his BBC soundtracks, e.g. for Crocodile Shoes.

== Track listing ==
All songs written by Tony McAnaney unless indicated.

1. King of the Doghouse - 3:36
2. I Don't Know - 4:21
3. Darlin' - 3:48
4. Give Myself to Love - 3:03
5. Isaac Ryan (Francis Rossi/Bernie Frost) - 4:19
6. Happy Town - 3:43
7. Wherever You Go - 3:09
8. Blue Water - 5:07
9. The Fighter (Rossi/Frost) - 5:29
10. Someone Show Me (Rossi/Frost) - 3:37

Notes: The original version of Someone Show Me appeared (as Someone Show Me Home) on Status Quo's If You Can't Stand the Heat Album in 1978. The Fighter should have been the title track for Quo's 1988 album which ultimately was released under the title Ain't Complaining - without The Fighter. The 2006 remastered version and 2018 deluxe edition of Ain't Complaining include Quo's version as a bonus track. Isaac Ryan dates back to earlier Quo days and was originally called Eyes are Cryin'.

Personnel:

- Francis Rossi (vocals, lead guitar)
- Marcus Brown (keyboards, programming, percussion, backing vocals)
- Danny Cummings (percussion)
- Anthony Macastoptalhiss (guitar, "bazooke")

Brass section:

- Nigel Hitchcock
- Nigel Sidwell
- Steve Sidwell
- Gerard Presencer (trumpet)

Backing vocals:

- Sonia Jones
- Dave Taggart
- Simon Rossi
- Nick Rossi
- Carol Kenyon

== Charts ==
Chart (1996)	Peak position
UK Albums (OCC)	95
