= Blue for You =

Studio album by Status Quo
- Released: 12 March 1976
- Recorded: December 1975 – January 1976
- Studios: Phonogram (London, UK)
- Genres: Hard rock; heavy metal
- Length: 37:09
- Labels: Vertigo (UK); Capitol (North America)
- Producers: Damon Lyon-Shaw, Status Quo

Status Quo chronology
On the Level (1975)	Blue for You (1976)	Live! (1977)

Singles from Blue for You
- 1. "Rain" Released: 6 February 1976; 2. "Mystery Song" Released: 2 July 1976

Professional ratings
Review scores
Source	Rating
AllMusic	2.5/5 stars
Sea of Tranquility	4/5 stars

Blue for You is the ninth studio album by British rock band Status Quo. It was released in March 1976, and is the last album until 1980's Just Supposin' that the band produced themselves.

Rick Parfitt's "Rain", the first single from the album, reached number 7 in the UK Singles Chart after its release in February 1976. Its B-side was the non-album track "You Lost the Love", written by Francis Rossi and Bob Young.

The album was released the following month. It entered the UK Albums Chart at number 1 and stayed there for three weeks, making it one of their most successful albums. In the US, the album was self-titled Status Quo and had a different album cover.

An edited version of Parfitt and Young's "Mystery Song", released in July that year, was the second single from the album, and peaked at number 11 a few months later. Parfitt and Alan Lancaster's "Drifting Away", from their 1974 album Quo, served as the single's B-side.

In December that year the band decided to release a cover of "Wild Side of Life", a song made famous by Hank Thompson and His Brazos Valley Boys, and written by Arlie Carter and William Warren, as a non-album single. Its B-side was a new Rossi/Lancaster composition, "All Through the Night". The single reached number 9 in the UK.

== Track listing ==
Side one
No.	Title	Writer(s)	Lead vocals	Length
1.	"Is There a Better Way"	Francis Rossi, Alan Lancaster	Lancaster	3:31
2.	"Mad About the Boy"	Francis Rossi, Bob Young	Rossi	3:35
3.	"Ring of a Change"	Rossi, Young	Rossi	3:40
4.	"Blue for You"	Alan Lancaster	Lancaster	4:08
5.	"Rain"	Rick Parfitt	Parfitt	4:24

Side two
No.	Title	Writer(s)	Lead vocals	Length
6.	"Rolling Home"	Rossi, Lancaster	Rossi	3:01
7.	"That's a Fact"	Rossi, Young	Rossi	4:20
8.	"Ease Your Mind"	Lancaster	Lancaster	3:12
9.	"Mystery Song"	Parfitt, Young	Parfitt	6:44

=== 2005 remaster bonus tracks ===
10. "You Lost the Love" (Rossi, Young)
11. "Mystery Song [Single Version]" (Parfitt, Young) - 4:00
12. "Wild Side of Life" (Arlie Carter, William Warren) - 3:17
13. "All Through the Night" (Rossi, Lancaster)
14. "Wild Side of Life [Demo Version]" (Carter, Warren)

=== 2017 deluxe edition bonus tracks ===
1. "You Lost the Love" (Rossi, Young) - 3:01
2. "Mystery Song [Single Version]" (Parfitt, Young) - 4:00
3. "Wild Side of Life" (Arlie Carter, William Warren) - 3:17
4. "All Through the Night" (Rossi, Lancaster) - 3:17
5. "Wild Side of Life [Demo Version]" (Carter, Warren) - 3:52
6. "Most of the Time [Live]" (Rossi, Young) - 3:20
7. "Roadhouse Blues [Live]" (Morrison, Krieger, Densmore, Manzarek) - 12:47
8. "Bye Bye Johnny [Live]" (Berry) - 6:37
9. "Caroline [Live]" (Rossi, Young) - 4:36
10. "In My Chair [Live]" (Rossi, Young) - 4:36
11. "Roll Over Lay Down [Live]" (Rossi, Young, Parfitt, Lancaster, Coghlan) - 6:09
12. "Is There a Better Way [Live]" (Rossi, Lancaster) - 3:43
13. "Rain [Live]" (Parfitt) - 4:37
14. "Honky Tonk Angel [Demo]" (Carter, Warren) - 3:51

Tracks 6 & 7 recorded live in Stoke 1975

Tracks 8–13 recorded live in Osaka 1976

Tracks 5 and 14 are the same recording

== Personnel ==
Status Quo

- John Coghlan - drums
- Alan Lancaster - bass, guitar, vocals
- Rick Parfitt - guitar, keyboards, vocals
- Francis Rossi - guitar, vocals

with:

- Andy Bown - piano on "Mad About the Boy" and "Ease Your Mind"
- Bob Young - harmonica on "Rolling Home"

== Charts ==
=== Weekly charts ===
Chart (1976–77)	Peak position
Australian Albums (Kent Music Report)	3
Canada Top Albums/CDs (RPM)	85
Finnish Albums (The Official Finnish Charts)	17
French Albums (SNEP)	4
Dutch Albums (Album Top 100)	2
German Albums (Offizielle Top 100)	15
New Zealand Albums (RMNZ)	9
Swedish Albums (Sverigetopplistan)	3
UK Albums (Official Charts)	1
US Billboard 200	148

Chart (2017)	Peak position
UK Rock & Metal Albums (Official Charts)	21

=== Year-end charts ===
Chart (1976)	Position
Australian Albums (Kent Music Report)	20
German Albums (Offizielle Top 100)	28
UK Albums (OCC)	28

== Certifications ==
Region	Certification	Certified units/sales
Australia (ARIA)	3× Platinum	150,000^{^}
Netherlands (NVPI)	Gold	25,000
France (SNEP)	Gold	100,000^{*}
New Zealand (RMNZ)	Platinum	15,000^{^}
Spain (Promusicae)	Platinum	100,000^{^}
United Kingdom (BPI)	Gold	100,000^{^}
^{*} Sales figures based on certification alone.^{^} Shipments figures based on certification alone.
