= In Search of the Fourth Chord =

Studio album by Status Quo
- Released: 17 September 2007
- Recorded: Hear No Evil Studios, London; ARSIS Studios, Surrey
- Genre: Hard rock, blues rock, boogie rock
- Length: 58:25
- Label: Fourth Chord Records
- Producer: Pip Williams

Status Quo chronology
The Party Ain't Over Yet (2005)	In Search of the Fourth Chord (2007)	Pictures – 40 Years of Hits (2008)

Singles from In Search of the Fourth Chord
- 1. "Beginning of the End" Released: 10 September 2007

Professional ratings
Review scores
Source	Rating
AllMusic	3.5/5 stars
Classic Rock	6/10 stars
PopMatters	7/10 stars

In Search of the Fourth Chord is the twenty-eighth studio album by British rock band Status Quo, released on 17 September 2007. The title is a tongue-in-cheek reference to the rumour that the group always plays the same three chords, and a reference to the album In Search of the Lost Chord by British rock band the Moody Blues. The album's artwork is a parody of the Indiana Jones films.

The album saw the return of producer Pip Williams for the first time since 1996's Don't Stop. It entered the UK Albums Chart at number 15.

The track "Bad News" also marks bassist John "Rhino" Edwards' first lead vocal on an original Status Quo song: his son Freddie also plays the guitar solo on the track. This track and "Gravy Train" (sung by Parfitt) are also the first two Status Quo tracks that were written solely by John Edwards.

== Track listing ==
1. "Beginning of the End" (Francis Rossi, John Edwards) – 4:23
2. "Alright" (Rick Parfitt, Wayne Morris) – 4:12
3. "Pennsylvania Blues Tonight" (Rossi, Bob Young) – 3:44
4. "I Don't Wanna Hurt You Anymore" (Rossi, Young) – 4:00
5. "Electric Arena" (Rossi, Young) – 5:25
6. "Gravy Train" (Edwards) – 3:23
7. "Figure of Eight" (Andy Bown) – 4:08
8. "You're the One for Me" (Matt Letley) – 3:30
9. "My Little Heartbreaker" (Rossi, Young) – 3:50
10. "Hold Me" (Rick Parfitt, Simon Climie, Wayne Morris) – 4:33
11. "Saddling Up" (Rossi, Bown) – 3:42
12. "Bad News" (Edwards) – 5:05
13. "Tongue Tied" (Rossi, Young) – 4:21

=== UK bonus track ===
14. "I Ain't Wastin' My Time" (Rossi, Young) – 3:36

=== Europe bonus track (excluding France) ===
14. "One by One" (Parfitt, Young) – 4:12

=== Still In Search Of The Fourth Chord (Germany enhanced bonus CD) ===
- CD2: Exclusive Bonus Live CD, Recorded live at the National Arboretum Westonbirt, Tetbury, Sunday 22 June 2008
1. "Caroline" (Rossi, Young) - 6:19 Live
2. "Beginning of the End" (Rossi, Edwards) - 4:14 Live
3. "In the Army Now" (Rob Bolland, Fred Bolland) - 4:04 Live
4. "Down Down" (Rossi, Young) - 4:45 Live
5. "Whatever You Want" (Parfitt, Bown) - 5:34 Live
6. "Rockin' All Over the World" (John Cameron Fogerty) - 3:50 Live
7. "Beginning of the End" (Rossi, Edwards) – Video

== Personnel ==
- Francis Rossi - vocals, lead guitar
- Rick Parfitt - vocals, guitar
- John Edwards - bass, vocals
- Andy Bown - keyboards
- Matt Letley - drums

=== Additional personnel ===
- Gregg Jackman – Logic programming
- Pip Williams – additional guitars
- Chloe du Pré – choir (track 13), cello (track 14, European edition)
- Freddie Edwards – guitars and solo (track 12)
- Daniel Jackman – second bass (track 13)
- Laura Macara – choir (track 13)
- Kevin McAlea – keyboards (track 4)
- Bob Young – harmonica (tracks 3 and 9, and track 14, UK edition)

Recorded at Hear No Evil Studios, London and Francis Rossi's "ARSIS" Studios ("A Roof Somewhere In Surrey"), Surrey

== Charts ==
Chart (2007)	Peak position
Dutch Albums (Album Top 100)	71
French Albums (SNEP)	142
German Albums (Offizielle Top 100)	22
Scottish Albums (OCC)	17
Swedish Albums (Sverigetopplistan)	13
UK Albums (OCC)	15
UK Independent Albums (OCC)	39
