= Ain't Complaining =

Studio album by Status Quo
- Released: 6 June 1988
- Studio: Chipping Norton (Oxfordshire, England); Ridge Farm Studio (Rusper, UK)
- Genre: Rock
- Length: 52:16
- Label: Vertigo
- Producer: Pip Williams

Status Quo chronology
| In the Army Now (1986) | Ain't Complaining (1988) | Perfect Remedy (1989) |

Singles from Ain't Complaining
- 1. "Ain't Complaining" Released: 14 March 1988; 2. "Who Gets the Love?" Released: 9 May 1988; 3. "Burning Bridges (On and Off and On Again)" Released: 21 November 1988

Professional ratings
Review scores
| Source | Rating |
|---|---|
| AllMusic | 2/5 stars |
| Kerrang! | 3/5 stars |

Ain't Complaining is the eighteenth studio album by British rock band Status Quo. Initially released on the Vertigo label on 6 June 1988, it was the group's first album on that label to fall short of the UK top 10, breaking a streak of 12 studio albums in the process. It reached no higher than its entry position of number 12 on the UK Albums Chart. The band would re-enter the Top 10 three years later with Rock 'til You Drop.

Ain't Complaining spawned three singles: the title track, the ballad "Who Gets the Love?" and the only UK top 10 hit among them, "Burning Bridges", which partially incorporated the melody of the traditional folk song "Darby Kelly" within its distinctive instrumental breaks, without crediting it as such. Band members John Edwards and Jeff Rich contributed compositions for the first time since joining Quo. "Another Shipwreck" had originally been a solo track by fellow band member Andy Bown from his 1978 solo album Good Advice and was released as a single with him singing lead vocals. On Ain't Complaining, Francis Rossi sings the song.

An unusual move by Status Quo on this album was the use and endorsement of Charvel guitars.

"The music was too polite," Rick Parfitt later remarked of the album. "There was no weight behind what we were doing. The edge had gone; we weren't real anymore."

== Track listing ==
| No. | Title | Writer(s) | Length |
|---|---|---|---|
| 1. | "Ain't Complaining" | Rick Parfitt; Pip Williams | 4:40 |
| 2. | "Everytime I Think of You" | John Edwards; Jeff Rich; Mike Paxman | 3:49 |
| 3. | "One for the Money" | Parfitt; Williams | 4:52 |
| 4. | "Another Shipwreck" | Andy Bown | 3:48 |
| 5. | "Don't Mind If I Do" | Francis Rossi; Edwards | 4:41 |
| 6. | "I Know You're Leaving" | Eric van Tijn; Jochem Fluitsma | 4:45 |
| 7. | "Cross That Bridge" | John David | 3:31 |
| 8. | "Cream of the Crop" | Rossi; Bernie Frost | 4:03 |
| 9. | "The Loving Game" | Parfitt; Edwards; Rich | 4:23 |
| 10. | "Who Gets the Love?" | Williams; John Goodison | 5:33 |
| 11. | "Burning Bridges" | Rossi; Bown | 4:19 |
| 12. | "Magic" | Rossi; Frost | 3:52 |

2006 remaster bonus tracks

| No. | Title | Writer(s) | Length |
|---|---|---|---|
| 1. | "That's Alright" | Rossi; Frost; Parfitt | 3:29 |
| 2. | "Lean Machine" | Rossi; Parfitt | 3:37 |
| 3. | "Halloween" | Parfitt; Rossi; Williams | 4:59 |
| 4. | "The Reason for Goodbye" | Williams; Johnny Goodison; Parfitt; Rossi | 3:54 |
| 5. | "The Greatest Fighter" | Rossi; Frost | 3:57 |
| 6. | "Running All Over the World" | John Fogerty | 3:31 |

=== 2018 Deluxe Edition ===
Disc one matched the regular album tracklist.

Disc two

1. "That's Alright" – B-Side – 12″ version of "Ain’t Complaining"
2. "Lean Machine" – B-Side – 12″ version of "Ain’t Complaining"
3. "Halloween" – B-Side – 12″ version of "Who Gets the Love?"
4. "The Reason for Goodbye" – B-Side – 12″ version of "Who Gets the Love?"
5. "The Greatest Fighter" – Outtake*
6. "Running All Over the World" – Single
7. "Ain’t Complaining" – Extended
8. "Who Gets the Love" – Extended
9. "Rockin All Over the World" – 1988 Re-recording
10. "Burning Bridges" – Extended
11. "Running All Over the World" – Extended
12. "The Fighter" – Stand Up and Fight Remix – 4 Track Demo*
13. "The Fighter" – Army Remix – 8 Track Demo*

Disc three (Live at Wembley, 07/07/1988; from BBC broadcast)

1. "Whatever You Want"
2. "Little Lady"
3. "Roll Over Lay Down"
4. "Cream of The Crop"
5. "Who Gets the Love"
6. "Hold You Back"
7. "Don't Drive My Car"
8. "Dirty Water"
9. "In the Army Now"
10. "Rockin' All Over the World"
11. "Don't Waste My Time"
12. "Bye Bye Johnny"

== Personnel ==
Status Quo

- Francis Rossi – vocals and lead guitar
- Rick Parfitt – vocals and guitar
- John Edwards – bass
- Andy Bown – keyboards
- Jeff Rich – drums

Additional personnel

- Bernie Frost – additional vocals
- Paul "Wix" Wickens – additional keyboards
- Graham Preskett – country violin on "Cross That Bridge" and "Burning Bridges"

== Charts ==
| Chart (1988) | Peak position |
|---|---|
| Austrian Albums (Ö3 Austria) | 11 |
| Finnish Albums (The Official Finnish Charts) | 12 |
| German Albums (Offizielle Top 100) | 33 |
| Norwegian Albums (VG-lista) | 13 |
| Swedish Albums (Sverigetopplistan) | 19 |
| Swiss Albums (Schweizer Hitparade) | 5 |
| UK Albums (OCC) | 12 |

== Certifications ==
| Region | Certification | Certified units/sales |
|---|---|---|
| United Kingdom (BPI) | Gold | 100,000^{^} |
^{^} Shipments figures based on certification alone.
