= List of number-one singles of 1986 (Ireland) =

This is a list of singles which have reached number one on the Irish Singles Chart in 1986.

Week ending	Song	Artist	Ref.
4 January	"Thank You Very Much Mr Eastwood"	Dermot Morgan	
11 January	"Thank You Very Much Mr Eastwood"	Dermot Morgan	
18 January	"The Sun Always Shines on T.V."	A-ha	
25 January	"Walk of Life"	Dire Straits	
1 February	"Borderline"	Madonna	
8 February	"Only Love"	Nana Mouskouri	
15 February	"When the Going Gets Tough, the Tough Get Going"	Billy Ocean	
22 February	"When the Going Gets Tough, the Tough Get Going"	Billy Ocean	
1 March	"Chain Reaction"	Diana Ross	
8 March	"Chain Reaction"	Diana Ross	
15 March	"Absolute Beginners"	David Bowie	
22 March	"Absolute Beginners"	David Bowie	
29 March	"Living Doll"	Cliff Richard and The Young Ones	
5 April	"Living Doll"	Cliff Richard and The Young Ones	
12 April	"Living Doll"	Cliff Richard and The Young Ones	
19 April	"Living Doll"	Cliff Richard and The Young Ones	
26 April	"Rock Me Amadeus"	Falco	
3 May	"Look Away"	Big Country	
10 May (joint No. 1)	"Make It Work"	Christy Moore, Paul Doran and The Self Aid Band	
10 May (joint No. 1)	"On My Own"	Patti LaBelle and Michael McDonald	
17 May	"The Chicken Song"	Spitting Image	
24 May	"The Chicken Song"	Spitting Image	
31 May	"Rollin' Home"	Status Quo	
7 June	"Holding Back the Years"	Simply Red	
14 June	"Spirit in the Sky"	Doctor and the Medics	
21 June	"The Edge of Heaven"	Wham!	
28 June	"Papa Don't Preach"	Madonna	
5 July	"Papa Don't Preach"	Madonna	
12 July	"The Lady in Red"	Chris de Burgh	
19 July	"The Lady in Red"	Chris de Burgh	
26 July	"The Lady in Red"	Chris de Burgh	
2 August	"The Lady in Red"	Chris de Burgh	
9 August	"The Lady in Red"	Chris de Burgh	
16 August	"The Lady in Red"	Chris de Burgh	
23 August	"The Lady in Red"	Chris de Burgh	
30 August	"I Want to Wake Up with You"	Boris Gardiner	
6 September	"I Want to Wake Up with You"	Boris Gardiner	
13 September	"Don't Leave Me This Way"	The Communards	
20 September	"Don't Leave Me This Way"	The Communards	
27 September	"Don't Leave Me This Way"	The Communards	
4 October	"True Blue"	Madonna	
11 October	"True Blue"	Madonna	
18 October	"In the Army Now"	Status Quo	
25 October	"All I Ask of You"	Cliff Richard and Sarah Brightman	
1 November	"Take My Breath Away"	Berlin	
8 November	"Take My Breath Away"	Berlin	
15 November	"Take My Breath Away"	Berlin	
22 November	"Take My Breath Away"	Berlin	
29 November	"The Final Countdown"	Europe	
6 December	"The Final Countdown"	Europe	
13 December	"Caravan of Love"	The Housemartins	
20 December	"Caravan of Love"	The Housemartins	
27 December	"Caravan of Love"	The Housemartins	

- 27 Number Ones
- Most weeks at No.1 (song): "The Lady in Red" – Chris de Burgh (7)
- Most weeks at No.1 (artist): Chris de Burgh (7)
- Most No.1s: Madonna (3)

== See also ==
- 1986 in music
- Irish Singles Chart
- List of artists who reached number one in Ireland
