= In the Army Now (album) =

Studio album by Status Quo
- Released: 29 August 1986
- Recorded: September 1985 – February 1986
- Studio: Chipping Norton (Oxfordshire, England); Jacobs Studios (Surrey)
- Genre: Boogie rock; hard rock; pop rock
- Length: 47:13
- Label: Vertigo
- Producer: Pip Williams; Dave Edmunds

Status Quo chronology
12 Gold Bars Vol. 2 (1984)	In the Army Now (1986)	Ain't Complaining (1988)

Singles from In the Army Now
- 1. "Rollin' Home" Released: May 1986; 2. "Red Sky" Released: July 1986; 3. "In the Army Now" Released: September 1986; 4. "Dreamin'" Released: November 1986

Professional ratings
Review scores
Source	Rating
AllMusic	4/5 stars
Kerrang!	3.5/5 stars
Record Mirror	2/5
Smash Hits	2/10

In the Army Now is the seventeenth studio album by the British rock band Status Quo, released on 29 August 1986 by Vertigo Records. Recorded at Chipping Norton Recording Studios in Oxfordshire and Jacobs Studios in Surrey, it was the first album with the post-Live Aid lineup, featuring bassist Rhino Edwards and drummer Jeff Rich, both of whom joined in March 1986.

"I was later told that nobody at the label was interested in a Quo featuring bassist Alan Lancaster and Rick Parfitt," recalled frontman Francis Rossi. "They wanted Parfitt and me. I also learned that unless we did something together, we'd have to pay back a shitload of money... I was adamant that I would never work with Lancaster again, but he warned us that he would injunct us if we tried to do it without him. And when we won he went fucking bananas."

The album contains covers of "In the Army Now", first recorded in 1982 by Dutch duo Rob and Ferdi Bolland, and "Speechless", from ex-Mott the Hoople singer Ian Hunter's 1983 album All of the Good Ones Are Taken.

Four singles were issued from the album: "Rollin' Home" (UK No. 9), "Red Sky" (UK No. 19), "In the Army Now" (UK No. 2), and "Dreamin'" (UK No. 15). The album itself reached No. 7 in the UK.

"The title song was great," Parfitt later observed of the album, "but it had too many fillers."

== Track listing ==
Side one
No.	Title	Writer(s)	Length
1.	"Rollin' Home"	John David	4:26
2.	"Calling"	Francis Rossi, Bernie Frost	4:04
3.	"In Your Eyes"	Rossi, Frost	5:08
4.	"Save Me"	Rossi, Rick Parfitt	4:25
5.	"In the Army Now"	Rob Bolland, Ferdi Bolland	4:41

Side two
No.	Title	Writer(s)	Length
6.	"Dreamin'"	Rossi, Frost	2:55
7.	"End of the Line"	Ricky Patrick, Parfitt	4:59
8.	"Invitation"	Rossi, Bob Young	3:16
9.	"Red Sky"	David	4:14
10.	"Speechless"	Ian Hunter	3:41
11.	"Overdose"	Pip Williams, Parfitt	5:25
Total length:			47:13

2006 remaster bonus tracks
No.	Title	Writer(s)	Length
12.	"Lonely" (B-side to the 12" single "Rollin' Home")	Parfitt, Rossi	5:08
13.	"Keep Me Guessing" (B-side to the 12" single "Rollin' Home")	Parfitt, Rossi, Young	4:32
14.	"Don't Give It Up" (B-side of "Red Sky")	Rhino Edwards, Richard Lightman, Parfitt, Rossi	4:23
15.	"Heartburn" (B-side to the 12" single "In the Army Now")	Parfitt, Patrick, Rossi	4:46
16.	"Late Last Night" (B-side to the 12" single "In the Army Now")	Parfitt, Rossi, Young	2:58
17.	"Long Legged Girls" (B-side of "Dreamin'")	Parfitt, Williams	5:38
Total length:			74:36

=== 2018 Deluxe Edition bonus tracks ===
1. In the Army Now - Remix
2. Lonely - B-Side - 12" of Rollin' Home
3. Keep Me Guessing - B-Side - 12" of Rollin' Home
4. Don't Give It Up - B-Side of Red Sky
5. Heartburn - B-Side - In the Army Now
6. Late Last Night - B-Side - In the Army Now
7. Long Legged Girls - B-Side - Dreamin'
8. Naughty Girl - Single Edit (aka Dreamin')
9. Rock N Roll Floorboards - Unreleased B-Side*
10. Naughty Girl - Extended (aka Dreamin')
11. Dreamin’ - Wet Mix
12. In the Army Now -Military Mix
13. The Cake Mix
14. Overdose – Live*
15. Dreamin' – Live*
16. Blues Jam – Live*
17. La Grange / Rain – Live*

== Personnel ==
=== Status Quo ===
- Francis Rossi – lead guitar, lead vocals (except 7&11)
- Rick Parfitt – guitar, background vocals. lead vocals on 7&11
- Jeff Rich – drums
- Andrew Bown – keyboards, backing vocals
- John "Rhino" Edwards – bass, backing vocals

=== Technical ===
- Pip Williams – producer
- Dave Edmunds – producer (on "Rollin' Home" and "Red Sky")
- Tim 'Ted' Summerhayes – recording engineer (except "Rollin' Home" and "Red Sky")
- Simon Sullivan – remix engineer (on "Calling", "In Your Eyes", "Save Me" and "In the Army Now")
- Gordon Vicary – mastering (at Townhouse Studios, London)
- Mark Wilkinson – sleeve design

== Charts ==
Chart (1986–87)	Peak position
Australian Albums (Kent Music Report)	87
Austrian Albums (Ö3 Austria)	12
Dutch Albums (Album Top 100)	50
Finnish Albums(The Official Finnish Charts)	15
French Albums (SNEP)	16
German Albums (Offizielle Top 100)	14
Norwegian Albums (VG-lista)	6
Spanish Albums (AFYVE)	13
Swedish Albums (Sverigetopplistan)	12
Swiss Albums (Schweizer Hitparade)	1
UK Albums (OCC)	7

== Certifications ==
Region	Certification	Certified units/sales
Norway (IFPI Norway)	Silver	25,000
Spain (PROMUSICAE)	Gold	50,000^{^}
United Kingdom (BPI)	Gold	100,000^{^}
^{^} Shipments figures based on certification alone.
