= Thinking of You (Status Quo song) =

Single by Status Quo

from the album XS All Areas – The Greatest Hits
- Released: 22 November 2004
- Genre: Rock
- Length: 3:36
- Label: Universal
- Songwriter(s): Mike Paxman

Status Quo singles chronology
"You'll Come 'Round" (2004)	"Thinking of You" (2004)	"The Party Ain't Over Yet" (2005)

"Thinking of You" is a single released by the English rock band Status Quo in 2004. It was included on the album XS All Areas – The Greatest Hits.

== Track listing ==
1. "Thinking of You" (Radio Mix) 3:36
2. "Mystery Medley" (Live at the Montreux Jazz Festival 04/07/04) 10:18
3. Trevor Dann Interview 4:52

== Charts ==
Chart (2004)	Peak position
UK Singles Chart	21
