= You'll Come 'Round =

Single by Status Quo

from the album XS All Areas – The Greatest Hits
- Released: 13 September 2004
- Genre: Rock
- Length: 3:21
- Label: Universal
- Songwriter(s): Young/Rossi
- Producer(s): Mike Paxman

Status Quo singles chronology
"All Stand Up (Never Say Never)" (2002)	"You'll Come 'Round" (2004)	"Thinking of You" (2004)

"You'll Come 'Round" is a single released by the British Rock band Status Quo in 2004. It was included on the album XS All Areas – The Greatest Hits.

== Track listing ==
1. "You'll Come Round" (Single Edit) (Rossi/Young) 3.21
2. "Lucinda" 3:11
3. "Down Down" (Live at the Montreux Jazz Festival 04/07/04) 5:49

== Charts ==
Chart (2004)	Peak position
UK Singles Chart	14
