= Ain't Complaining (song) =

Single by Status Quo

from the album Ain't Complaining
- Released: 14 March 1988
- Genre: Rock
- Length: 3:59
- Label: Vertigo
- Songwriter(s): Rick Parfitt, Pip Williams
- Producer(s): Pip Williams

Status Quo singles chronology
| "Dreamin'" (1986) | "Ain't Complaining" (1988) | "Who Gets the Love?" (1988) |

"Ain't Complaining" is a single released by the British rock band Status Quo in 1988. It was included on their eighteenth studio album, Ain't Complaining (1988).

Some versions of the 7 inch also featured a limited edition History Pack featuring a special outer box made from card and inside part one of the Status Quo family tree - drawn and compiled by Pete Frame. This was Status Quo's first CD single. A video CD was later issued in November 1988.

== Track listing ==
=== 7 inch ===
1. "Ain't Complaining" (Parfitt/Williams) (3.59)
2. "That's Alright" (Rossi/Frost/Parfitt) (3.31)

=== 12 inch ===
1. "Ain't Complaining" (Extended) (Parfitt/Williams) (6.37)
2. "That's Alright" (Rossi/Frost/Parfitt) (3.31)
3. "Lean Machine" (Rossi/Parfitt) (3.37)

=== CD ===
1. "Ain't Complaining" (Parfitt/Williams) (6.37)
2. "That's Alright" (Rossi/Frost/Parfitt) (3.31
3. "Lean Machine" (Rossi/Parfitt) (3.37)
4. "In The Army Now" (Re-mix) (Bolland/Bolland) (4.44)

=== CD Video ===
1. "Ain't Complaining" (Parfitt/Williams) (6.37)
2. "That's Alright" (Rossi/Frost/Parfitt) (3.31
3. "Lean Machine" (Rossi/Parfitt) (3.37)
4. "In The Army Now" (Re-mix) (Bolland/Bolland) (4.44)
5. "Ain't Complaining" (Video track)

== Charts ==
| Chart (1986) | Peak position |
|---|---|
| Austria (Ö3 Austria Top 40) | 5 |
| Ireland (IRMA) | 8 |
| Switzerland (Schweizer Hitparade) | 21 |
| UK Singles (OCC) | 19 |
| West Germany (GfK) | 39 |
