= Heavy Traffic (album) =

Studio album by Status Quo
- Released: 23 September 2002
- Recorded: State of The Ark Studios
- Genre: Hard rock
- Length: 52:33
- Label: Universal
- Producer: Mike Paxman

Status Quo chronology
Famous in the Last Century (2000)	Heavy Traffic (2002)	Riffs (2003)

Professional ratings
Review scores
Source	Rating
Allmusic	Review

Heavy Traffic is the twenty-fifth studio album by British rock band Status Quo, and their first to feature drummer Matt Letley. Released in 2002, it reached number 15 in the UK.

The album followed the reunion of Francis Rossi with writing partner Bob Young, who co-wrote many of the band's songs between 1968 and 1981. "I'm aware that the last couple of albums have upset some of our fans," remarked Rossi. "That's something that we do care about, and people's reaction to the new material has been incredible. Writing with Bob again has given me a whole new lease of life." "This new album's in a whole different league," added Rick Parfitt. "It feels real again. A whole new era is about to begin."

== UK track listing ==
1. "Blues and Rhythm" (Francis Rossi, Andy Bown) 4:29
2. "All Stand Up (Never Say Never)" (Francis Rossi, Bob Young) 4:08
3. "The Oriental" (Francis Rossi, John Edwards) 4:29
4. "Creepin' Up On You" (Rick Parfitt, John Edwards) 5:01
5. "Heavy Traffic" (Francis Rossi, Bob Young, John Edwards) 4:23
6. "Solid Gold" (Francis Rossi, Bob Young) 4:14
7. "Green" (Andy Bown) 3:35
8. "Jam Side Down" (Terry Britten, Charlie Dore) 3:27
9. "Diggin' Burt Bacharach" (Francis Rossi, Bob Young) 2:32
10. "Do It Again" (John Edwards, Andy Bown) 3:40
11. "Another Day" (Francis Rossi, Bob Young) 3:47
12. "I Don't Remember Anymore" (Andy Bown) 3:38
13. "Money Don't Matter" (Francis Rossi, Bob Young) 3:46 (Bonus Track UK Edition)
14. "Rhythm of Life" (Francis Rossi, Bob Young) 5:05

== European track listing ==
1. "Blues and Rhythm" (Rossi/Bown) 4:29
2. "All Stand Up" (Never Say Never) (Rossi/Young) 4:08
3. "The Oriental" (Rossi/Edwards) 4:29
4. "Creepin' Up On You" (Parfitt/Edwards) 5:01
5. "Heavy Traffic" (Rossi/Young/Edwards) 4:23
6. "Solid Gold" (Rossi/Young) 4:14
7. "Green" (Bown) 3:35
8. "Jam Side Down" (Britten/Dore) 3:27
9. "Diggin' Burt Bacharach" (Rossi/Young) 2:32
10. "Do It Again" (Edwards/Bown) 3:40
11. "Another Day" (Rossi/Young) 3:47
12. "I Don't Remember Anymore" (Bown) 3:38
13. "Rhythm of Life" (Rossi/Young) 5:05

== Australasian track listing ==
1. Blues and Rhythm (Rossi/Bown) 4:29
2. All Stand Up (Never Say Never) (Rossi/Young) 4:08
3. The Oriental (Rossi/Edwards) 4:29
4. Creepin' Up On You (Parfitt/Edwards) 5:01
5. Heavy Traffic (Rossi/Young/Edwards) 4:23
6. Solid Gold (Rossi/Young) 4:14
7. Green (Bown) 3:35
8. Jam Side Down (Britten/Dore) 3:27
9. Diggin' Burt Bacharach (Rossi/Young) 2:32
10. Do It Again (Edwards/Bown) 3:40
11. Another Day (Rossi/Young) 3:47
12. I Don't Remember Anymore (Bown) 3:38
13. Money Don't Matter (Rossi/Young) 3:52
14. You Let Me Down (Rossi/Young) 5:02

== Personnel ==
- Francis Rossi – Vocals and lead guitars
- Rick Parfitt – Vocals and guitars
- John Edwards – Bass
- Andy Bown – Keyboards, guitars, harmonica, vocals
- Matt Letley – Drums

Recorded at State of The Ark Studios

== Charts ==
Chart (2002)	Peak position
Danish Albums (Hitlisten)	36
Dutch Albums (Album Top 100)	75
German Albums (Offizielle Top 100)	35
Scottish Albums (OCC)	23
Swedish Albums (Sverigetopplistan)	30
Swiss Albums (Schweizer Hitparade)	21
UK Albums (OCC)	15
UK Rock & Metal Albums (OCC)	5

== Certifications ==
Region	Certification	Certified units/sales
United Kingdom (BPI)	Silver	60,000^{^}
^{^} Shipments figures based on certification alone.
