= Dreamin' (Status Quo song) =

Single by Status Quo

from the album In the Army Now
- Released: 28 November 1986
- Genre: Rock
- Length: 3:07
- Label: Vertigo
- Songwriter: Rossi/Frost
- Producer: Pip Williams

Status Quo singles chronology
| "In the Army Now" (1986) | "Dreamin'" (1986) | "Ain't Complaining" (1988) |

"Dreamin'" is a song and single released by the British Rock band Status Quo in 1986. It was included on the album In the Army Now.

"Dreamin'" was originally titled "Naughty Girl". The 7 inch vinyl single was also issued with a wraparound poster/calendar. The Wet Mix on the 12 inch vinyl single is unavailable elsewhere. The "Quo Christmas Cake Mix" is a medley produced by Sonny-X that comprises extracts from the original Quo recordings of the songs featured; this medley is also unavailable on any other album.

According to the book Just for the Record this was the first song co-written by Francis Rossi and Bernie Frost. They wrote it as "Naughty Girl" in the very early 1970s, almost 15 years prior to recording it. It was one of the first demos recorded by the then "new" line-up in 1985. Scheduled as a single backed with the unreleased "Rock And Roll Floorboards", it first was cancelled as Alan Lancaster went to court to stop Rossi and Parfitt from using the name "Status Quo". For this reason "Naughty Girl" was allocated the "lost" matrix number QUO17. While test pressings were made for the 7" an extended mix remained completely unreleased.

As "Dreamin'" it finally appeared on the album and became the follow-up release to the "In The Army Now" single later. Various mixes of the song exist both in official and unofficial releases.

== Track listing ==
=== 7 inch ===
1. "Dreamin'" (Rossi/Frost) (3.07)
2. "Long-Legged Girls" (Williams/Parfitt) (4.24)

=== 12 inch - Wet Mix ===
1. "Dreamin' (Wet Mix)" (Rossi/Frost) (4.26)
2. "Long-Legged Girls" (Williams/Parfitt) (4.24)
3. "The Quo Christmas Cake Mix" (Featuring: "The Wanderer" / "Whatever You Want" / "Something 'Bout You Baby (I Like)" / "Roll over Lay Down" / "Rain" / "Break the Rules" / "Rockin' All over the World") (5.56)

== Charts ==
| Chart (1986–1987) | Peak position |
|---|---|
| Germany (GfK) | 20 |
| Ireland (IRMA) | 11 |
| Switzerland (Schweizer Hitparade) | 17 |
| UK Singles (OCC) | 15 |
