= Who Gets the Love? =

Single by Status Quo

from the album Ain't Complaining
- Released: 9 May 1988
- Genre: Rock
- Length: 5:32
- Label: Vertigo
- Songwriter(s): P Williams/J Goodison
- Producer(s): Pip Williams

Status Quo singles chronology
"Ain't Complaining" (1988)	"Who Gets the Love?" (1988)	"Rockin' All Over the World" (1988)

"Who Gets the Love?" is a single released by the British Rock band Status Quo in 1988. It was included on the album Ain't Complaining.

Some versions of the 7 inch vinyl single also featured a limited edition History Pack featuring a special outer box made from card and inside part two of the Status Quo family tree - drawn and compiled by Pete Frame. "Halloween" was originally written and recorded for Rick Parfitt's unreleased solo album Recorded Delivery in 1985.

== Track listing ==
=== 7 inch ===
1. "Who Gets the Love?" (P Williams/J Goodison) (5.32)
2. "Halloween" (Parfitt/Williams/Rossi) (4.58)

=== 12 inch ===
1. "Who Gets the Love?" (P Williams/J Goodison) (7.09)
2. "Halloween" (Parfitt/Williams/Rossi) (4.58)
3. "The Reason For Goodbye" (Williams/Goodison/Parfitt/Rossi) (3.54)

=== CD ===
1. "Who Gets the Love?" (P Williams/J Goodison) (7.09)
2. "Halloween" (Parfitt/Williams/Rossi) (4.58)
3. "The Reason For Goodbye" (Williams/Goodison/Parfitt/Rossi) (3.54)
4. "The Wanderer" (Sharon The Nag Mix) (E Maresca) (3.33)

== Charts ==
Chart (1988)	Peak position
Ireland (IRMA)	27
UK Singles (OCC)	34
