= Beginning of the End (Status Quo song) =

Single by Status Quo

from the album In Search of the Fourth Chord
- Released: 2007
- Length: 4:23
- Label: Fourth Chord Records
- Songwriter(s): Francis Rossi, John Edwards
- Producer(s): Pip Williams

Status Quo singles chronology
"All That Counts Is Love" (2005)	"Beginning of the End" (2007)

Music video
- "Beginning Of The End" (Official Video) on YouTube

"Beginning of the End" is a single released by the British rock band Status Quo in 2007. It was included on the album In Search of the Fourth Chord. It reached number 48 on the UK Singles Chart in September 2007.

"Beginning of the End" is the sole single from In Search of the Fourth Chord. Much heavier than most of its recent predecessors (thereby signalling a move back towards a harder rock sound), it has gained distinction as being one of the few "newer" songs to survive in the live set and has continued to stay there up until the current Out Out Quoing tour. Live versions can be found on "Pictures – Live at Montreux 2009" and the bonus "Official Live Bootleg" that came with Quid Pro Quo (this same version was used on the soundtrack of the "Bula Quo" movie and is therefore also on disc 2 of the album). "Beginning of the End" was also notable for being the first self-penned lead single of a Quo studio album since 1999's "The Way It Goes". The track also appears on the 2015 compilation album Accept No Substitute! The Definitive Hits.

As "Beginning of the End" opens the album, the introduction by a woman saying "Now, let's listen to the music and try to identify the chord" makes sense since after the last regular song "Tongue Tied" the same voice is heard to say "Did you manage to find it?"

The official video for the single was shot aboard the London Eye and was directed by John Keeling. This was also available as a two-sided single: The CD side plays the audio track, the DVD side the promo video.

A live version of the song was included on the deluxe edition of the 2011 studio album Quid Pro Quo.

== Personnel ==
- Francis Rossi – vocals, lead guitar
- Rick Parfitt – vocals, guitar
- John Edwards – bass, vocals
- Andy Bown – keyboards
- Matt Letley – drums

== Charts ==
Chart (2007)	Peak position
UK Singles Chart	48
