= Quo (Status Quo album) =

Studio album by Status Quo
- Released: 3 May 1974
- Recorded: Spring 1974
- Studio: IBC, London
- Genre: Hard rock; heavy metal
- Length: 36:54
- Label: Vertigo (UK); A&M (US)
- Producer: Status Quo

Status Quo chronology
Hello! (1973)	Quo (1974)	On the Level (1975)

Singles from Quo
- 1. "Break the Rules" Released: 26 April 1974

Professional ratings
Review scores
Source	Rating
AllMusic	4/5 stars

Quo is the seventh studio album by the British rock band Status Quo. Issued in May 1974, it reached #2 in the UK. Like its predecessor Hello!, it consisted entirely of songs written or co-written by the group. The album features guest musicians Bob Young and Tom Parker, who played harmonica and piano respectively on "Break the Rules".

The album is regarded as one of their heaviest, possibly due to the influence of bassist Alan Lancaster, who co-wrote six of the eight tracks. "When we wrote 'Drifting Away'," recalled Rick Parfitt, "it sounded so, so heavy. That rhythm was constant, right in your face. It was just such a turn-on. That's where my head was at back then. You know: just let it fucking rock."

The UK LP contained a gatefold insert with a picture of the band playing live on one side, and the lyrics on the other. The sleeve art was by British artist Dave Field.

The band believed the opening "Backwater" to be the most suitable candidate for a single. However, the only track released as a single was "Break the Rules", in April 1974. It peaked in the UK at #8. The B-side of the single was "Lonely Night", which was not on an album until it became a bonus track on the 2005 reissue. Two years after release, "Lonely Night" was plagiarised by Australian band the Angels in their song "Am I Ever Gonna See Your Face Again", for which Status Quo subsequently received royalties.

== Track listing ==
Side one
No.	Title	Writer(s)	Lead vocals	Length
1.	"Backwater"	Rick Parfitt, Alan Lancaster	Lancaster	4:22
2.	"Just Take Me"	Parfitt, Lancaster	Lancaster	3:31
3.	"Break the Rules"	Francis Rossi, Rick Parfitt, Alan Lancaster, John Coghlan, Bob Young	Rossi	3:37
4.	"Drifting Away"	Parfitt, Lancaster	Lancaster	5:00

Side two
No.	Title	Writer(s)	Lead vocals	Length
5.	"Don't Think it Matters"	Parfitt, Lancaster	Lancaster	4:48
6.	"Fine Fine Fine"	Rossi, Young	Rossi	2:31
7.	"Lonely Man"	Parfitt, Lancaster	Parfitt	5:05
8.	"Slow Train"	Rossi, Young	Rossi	7:55

=== 2005 remaster bonus track ===
1. Lonely Night (Rossi, Parfitt, Lancaster, Coghlan, Young) – 3:26

=== 2015 deluxe edition bonus tracks (all except track 1 live At Paris L'Olympia, 11th January 1975) ===
1. Lonely Night (Studio Version) (Rossi, Parfitt, Lancaster, Coghlan, Young) – 3:26
2. Junior's Wailing (Kieran Raymond White, Martin John Pugh) – 5:41
3. Backwater (Parfitt, Lancaster) – 4:25
4. Just Take Me (Parfitt, Lancaster) – 4:33
5. Claudie (Rossi, Young) – 4:53
6. Railroad (Rossi, Young) – 5:44
7. Roll Over Lay Down (Rossi, Parfitt, Lancaster, Coghlan, Young) – 5:36
8. Big Fat Mama (Rossi, Parfitt) – 5:45
9. Don't Waste My Time (Rossi, Young) – 4:04
10. Roadhouse Blues (Morrison, Densmore, Manzarek, Krieger) – 16:53
11. Caroline (Rossi, Young) – 8:00
12. Bye By Johnny (Chuck Berry) – 7:02
13. Lonely Night (Rossi, Parfitt, Lancaster, Coghlan, Young) – 3:26

== Personnel ==
Status Quo

- Francis Rossi – guitar, vocals
- Rick Parfitt – guitar, vocals
- Alan Lancaster – bass, vocals
- John Coghlan – drums

Additional personnel

- Bob Young – harmonica
- Tom Parker – keyboards
- Status Quo – producers
- Damon Lyon-Shaw – engineer and mix
- Richard Manwaring, Andy Miller – assistant engineers
- Dave Field – illustration and design

== Charts ==
Chart (1974–75)	Peak position
Australian Albums (Kent Music Report)	23
Austrian Albums (Ö3 Austria)	10
Finnish Albums (The Official Finnish Charts)	10
German Albums (Offizielle Top 100)	11
Norwegian Albums (VG-lista)	6
UK Albums (OCC)	2

Chart (2015)	Peak position
UK Rock & Metal Albums (OCC)	31

== Certifications ==
Region	Certification	Certified units/sales
Australia (ARIA)	Gold	20,000^{^}
France (SNEP)	Gold	100,000^{*}
Sweden (GLF)	Gold	25,000
Switzerland (IFPI Switzerland)	Gold	25,000^{^}
United Kingdom (BPI)	Gold	100,000^{^}
^{*} Sales figures based on certification alone.^{^} Shipments figures based on certification alone.
