= In My Chair =

Single by Status Quo
- B-side: "Gerdundula"
- Released: 23 October 1970
- Genre: Blues rock
- Length: 3:14
- Label: Pye
- Songwriters: Francis Rossi; Bob Young
- Producer: John Schroeder

Status Quo singles chronology
"Down the Dustpipe" (1970)	"In My Chair" (1970)	"Tune to the Music" (1971)

"In My Chair" is a single released by the British rock band Status Quo in 1970. It was produced by John Schroeder.

The song was written in an afternoon by Francis Rossi and Bob Young in Rossi's kitchen.

It later appeared on numerous compilation albums, including Pictures – 40 Years of Hits, and has remained a regular feature of Status Quo live sets over subsequent decades, including their first live album in 1977.

== Track listing ==
1. "In My Chair" (Rossi / Young) (3.14)
2. "Gerdundula" (Manston / James) (3.19)

== Charts ==
Chart (1970)	Peak position
Germany (GfK)	38
UK Singles (OCC)	21
