= Rollin' Home =

1986 single by Status Quo

Single by Status Quo

from the album In the Army Now
- Released: 9 May 1986
- Genre: Rock
- Length: 3:56
- Label: Vertigo
- Songwriter: John David
- Producer: Dave Edmunds

Status Quo singles chronology
"The Wanderer" (1984)	"Rollin' Home" (1986)	"Red Sky" (1986)

"Rollin' Home" is a single released by the British rock band Status Quo in 1986 (not to be confused with the earlier "Rolling Home", from the album Blue for You). It was included on the album In the Army Now. It was written by John David (bass player with the Dave Edmunds' band) and produced by Dave Edmunds. The 7 inch was also produced as a Q-shaped picture disc.

The song was reprised, in 2014, for the band's thirty-first studio album Aquostic (Stripped Bare). It was featured in the ninety-minute launch performance of the album at London's Roundhouse on 22 October, the concert being recorded and broadcast live by BBC Radio 2 as part of their In Concert series.

== Track listing ==
=== 7 inch vinyl ===
1. "Rollin' Home" (J David) (3.56)
2. "Lonely" (Rossi/Parfitt) (5.05)

=== 12 inch vinyl ===
1. "Rollin' Home" (J David) (4.24)
2. "Lonely" (Rossi/Parfitt) (5.50)
3. "Keep Me Guessing" (Rossi/Young/Parfitt) (4.30)

== Charts ==
Chart (1986)	Peak position
Ireland (IRMA)	1
Netherlands (Single Top 100)	43
Norway (VG-lista)	9
Switzerland (Schweizer Hitparade)	10
UK Singles (OCC)	9
