= Down the Dustpipe =

Single by Status Quo
- B-side: "Face Without a Soul"
- Released: 6 March 1970
- Genre: Rock and roll, blues rock, boogie rock
- Length: 2:00
- Label: Pye
- Songwriter: Carl Groszmann
- Producer: John Schroeder

Status Quo singles chronology
| "The Price of Love" (1969) | "Down the Dustpipe" (1970) | "In My Chair" (1970) |

Official audio
- "Down the Dustpipe" (2002 remix) on YouTube

"Down the Dustpipe" is a song written by Australian singer-songwriter Carl Groszmann, and recorded by Status Quo.

== Background ==
Groszmann, a member of Australian group Steve and the Board, was a client of Valley Music, who were affiliated to Status Quo's management in their early days. It was initially offered to and recorded by another Australian group The Mint, who recorded a more big band style version with brass as a single on the Ramrod label. (Their version can be found on Youtube). When Status Quo recorded it, in Francis Rossi’s words, "it was the first record to feature our soon-to-be trademark boogie shuffle". It became one of the most popular numbers in their live set. Released as a single in March 1970, it took the media by surprise as it was so different in sound from their previous work. BBC Radio 1 presenter Tony Blackburn dismissed it on air the first time he played it with the comment, "Down the dustbin for this one."

A demo version of the song was recorded by Welsh band Man, who were hired by Pye Records as a studio band. They taught their arrangement of the song to Status Quo, who adopted it without changing much. In the future, whenever the two bands met, Man found it entertaining to keep reminding Status Quo of who did the original arrangement for their hit single.

The harmonica was played by Bob Young, who had recently joined Status Quo as their roadie but became an unofficial member, playing harmonica on several subsequent recordings and co-writing many of their singles and album tracks. It is notable for the minimal guitar work, with bass guitar, drums and piano all being much more in evidence throughout, as well as the vocal harmony on the choruses. Although initially ignored by Radio 1, it made the charts largely through the group's increasing popularity as a live band, and reached number 12 in the UK Singles Chart in July. Its slow progress gave it a 17-week stay in the Top 50, something never achieved by any of their subsequent, more well-known singles.

It remained unavailable on Status Quo's albums until the release of the compilation The Best of Status Quo in 1973, and has appeared on several compilations since then. The band re-recorded it on their 2003 album Riffs, the new version being similar to the original but about 20 seconds longer. The song was reprised, in 2014, for Status Quo's thirty-first studio album Aquostic (Stripped Bare). It was featured in the ninety-minute launch performance of the album at London's Roundhouse on 22 October, the concert being recorded and broadcast live by BBC Radio 2 as part of their In Concert series.

== Single ==
- 1970: "Down the Dustpipe" / "Face Without a Soul" [p] 45 rpm Vinyl 7" – Pye / 7N 17907

== Maxi single ==
- 1977: "Down the Dustpipe" - 2:03 - (C. Groszmann) / "Mean Girl" - 3:53 - (Rossi/Young) / "In My Chair" - 3:14 - (Rossi/Young) / "Gerdundula" - 3:19 - (Manston/James) 12" – Pye, Release 13. 05. 1977

== Charts ==
| Chart (1970) | Peak position |
|---|---|
| Australian Singles (Kent Music Report) | 12 |
| Ireland (IRMA) | 11 |
| UK Singles (Official Charts) | 12 |
