= Mystery Song =

Single by Status Quo

from the album Blue for You
- B-side: "Drifting Away"
- Released: 2 July 1976
- Genre: Hard rock; proto-metal
- Length: 6:44 (album version); 3:58 single version
- Label: Vertigo
- Songwriters: Rick Parfitt; Bob Young
- Producer: Status Quo

Status Quo singles chronology
"Rain" (1976)	"Mystery Song" (1976)	"Wild Side of Life" (1976)

Official audio
- "Mystery Song" on YouTube

"Mystery Song" is a single released by the British rock band Status Quo in 1976. It was included on the album Blue for You.

The song concerns a young man's encounter with a prostitute. The B-side was "Drifting Away", from the band's 1974 album Quo.

The song was reprised, in 2014, for the band's thirty-first studio album Aquostic – Stripped Bare. It was featured in the ninety-minute launch performance of the album at London's Roundhouse on 22 October, the concert being recorded and broadcast live by BBC Radio 2 as part of their In Concert series.

== Track listing ==
- "Mystery Song" (Parfitt/Young) (3.58) / "Drifting Away" (Parfitt/Lancaster) (5.05), Vertigo: 6059 146 (UK, Netherlands, Germany, Ireland, Australia)
- "Mystery Song" / "Rain", Vertigo: 6059 146 (Italy)

== Charts ==
Chart (1976)	Peak position
Belgium (Ultratop 50 Flanders)	21
Belgium (Ultratop 50 Wallonia)	28
Netherlands (Single Top 100)	15
Germany (GfK)	38
Sweden (Sverigetopplistan)	13
UK Singles (OCC)	11
