= Burning Bridges (Status Quo song) =

"Burning Bridges (On and Off and On Again)"
- Artwork for UK vinyl releases

Single by Status Quo

from the album Ain't Complaining
- B-side: "Whatever You Want" "Marguerita Time" (12-inch only)
- Released: 21 November 1988
- Genre: Rock
- Length: 3:51
- Label: Vertigo
- Songwriter(s): Rossi / Bown
- Producer(s): Pip Williams

Status Quo singles chronology
"Rocking All Over the World" (1988)	"Burning Bridges (On and Off and On Again)" (1988)	"Not at All" (1989)

"Burning Bridges (On and Off and On Again)" is a single released by the British rock band Status Quo in 1988. It was included on the album Ain't Complaining. The tune is based on the traditional English folk song "Darby Kelly".

In 1994 Manchester United F.C. used the song as the basis for their FA Cup song "Come On You Reds", which reached number one in the UK Singles Chart in May 1994.

The song was reprised, in 2014, for the band's thirty-first studio album Aquostic (Stripped Bare). It was featured in the ninety-minute launch performance of the album at London's Roundhouse on 22 October, the concert being recorded and broadcast live by BBC Radio 2 as part of their In Concert series.

== Track listing ==
=== 7 inch vinyl ===
1. "Burning Bridges (On and Off and On Again)" (Rossi/Bown) (3.51)
2. "Whatever You Want" (Parfitt/Bown) (4.01)

=== 12 inch vinyl ===
1. "Burning Bridges (On and Off and On Again)" (Extended Version) (Rossi/Bown) (5.29)
2. "Whatever You Want" (Parfitt/Bown) (4.03)
3. "Marguerita Time" (Rossi/Frost) (3.27)

=== CD ===
1. "Burning Bridges (On and Off and On Again)" (Extended Version) (Rossi/Bown) (5.29)
2. "Whatever You Want" (Parfitt/Bown) (4.03)

=== CD Video ===
(Not released until April 1989)

1. "Burning Bridges (On and Off and On Again)" (Extended Version) (Rossi/Bown) (5.29)
2. "Whatever You Want" (Parfitt/Bown) (4.03)
3. "Marguerita Time" (Rossi/Frost) (3.27)
4. "Who Gets The Love?" (P Williams /J Goodison) (5.32)
5. "Burning Bridges (On and Off and On Again)" (Video track)

== Charts ==
Chart (1988)	Peak position
Ireland (IRMA)	8
UK Singles (OCC)	5

== Certifications ==
Region	Certification	Certified units/sales
United Kingdom (BPI)	Silver	250,000^{^}
^{^} Shipments figures based on certification alone.
