= Red Sky (song) =

1986 single by Status Quo

Single by Status Quo

from the album In the Army Now
- Released: 18 July 1986
- Genre: Rock
- Length: 4:13
- Label: Vertigo
- Songwriter(s): John David
- Producer(s): Dave Edmunds

Status Quo singles chronology
"Rollin' Home" (1986)	"Red Sky" (1986)	"In the Army Now" (1986)

"Red Sky" is a single released by the British Rock band Status Quo in 1986. It was included on the album In the Army Now.

It was the second of two songs written by John David and produced by Dave Edmunds. The 7 inch was also issued as a double pack with an additional single "Rocking All Over The World"/"Whatever You Want". Also to promote this release special jars of coffee were made. "Don't Give It Up" had previously been recorded by Rhino in 1983, but never released. This track was also recorded by Rick Parfitt (also featuring John Edwards and Jeff Rich) for his own solo album. For the 12 inch release a "Live At Wembley" poster gave the medley track list.

== Track listing ==
=== 7 inch ===
1. "Red Sky" (J David) (4.13)
2. "Don't Give It Up" (Lightman/Edwards/Rossi/Parfitt) (4.18)

=== 12 inch ===
1. "Red Sky" (J David) (4.13)
2. "Don't Give It Up" (Lightman/Edwards/Rossi/Parfitt) (4.18)
3. "The Milton Keynes Medley" (featuring "Mystery Song" / "Railroad" / "Most Of The Time" / "Wild Side Of Life" / "Slow Train") (8.13)

== Charts ==
Chart (1986)	Peak position
Ireland (IRMA)	5
Switzerland (Schweizer Hitparade)	29
UK Singles (OCC)	19
