= Mean Girl =

Single by Status Quo

from the album Dog of Two Head
- B-side: "Everything"
- Released: 1973
- Recorded: 1971
- Genre: Hard rock, boogie rock
- Label: Pye Records
- Songwriter(s): Francis Rossi; Bob Young
- Producer(s): John Schroeder

Status Quo singles chronology
"Paper Plane" (1972)	"Mean Girl" (1973)	"Gerdundula" (1973)

Music video
- "Mean Girl" on YouTube

"Mean Girl" is a single released by the British rock band Status Quo in 1973. It was taken from their November 1971 album Dog of Two Head.

Pye Records released the song more than a year after the album, following the success of the single "Paper Plane", released in November 1972 on the Vertigo label. It became a UK Top 20 hit – previously only three of the ten Pye singles had made the Top 20. They tried this again with the single "Gerdundula", another track from the same album, but it failed to chart.

The band included the song in the set for their 2009 Glastonbury Festival debut.

== Singles ==
- 1973: "Mean Girl" (Rossi/Young) (3.53) / "Everything" (Rossi/Parfitt) (2.35) Vinyl 7", Pye: 7N 45229, United Kingdom
- 1973: "Mean Girl" / "Tune to the Music", Vinyl 7", Pye: 12 661 AT, Germany
- 1978: "Mean Girl" / "In My Chair", Vinyl 7", Pye: 7N 46095, United Kingdom
- 1986: "Mean Girl" / "Technicolour Dreams", Vinyl 7", BR / 45096, Netherlands

== Personnel ==
- Francis Rossi - lead guitar, acoustic guitar, lead vocals
- Rick Parfitt - rhythm guitar, acoustic guitar, piano, backing vocals
- Alan Lancaster - bass, guitar
- John Coghlan - drums, percussion
- Bruce Foster - piano

== Charts ==
Chart (1973)	Peak position
Netherlands (Single Top 100)	14
Germany (GfK)	40
UK Singles (OCC)	20
