= Rain (Status Quo song) =

Single by Status Quo

from the album Blue for You
- B-side: "You Lost the Love"
- Released: 6 February 1976
- Genre: Hard rock; boogie rock
- Length: 4:33
- Label: Vertigo
- Songwriter(s): Rick Parfitt
- Producer(s): Status Quo

Status Quo singles chronology
"Roll Over Lay Down" (1975)	"Rain" (1976)	"Mystery Song" (1976)

"Rain" is a single from British rock band Status Quo's album Blue for You. It was written by Rick Parfitt.

"Rain" was intended for Blue for You's predecessor On the Level – but, at the time of the recording sessions, Parfitt had not completed the song and so it was held over. It followed guitarist Francis Rossi's introduction to speed; "That's why songs like 'Rain' were so edgy and fast," he explained.

The song was reprised in 2014 for the band's thirty-first studio album Aquostic (Stripped Bare). It was featured in the ninety-minute launch performance for the album at London's Roundhouse on 22 October, broadcast live by BBC Radio 2 as part of their In Concert series.

== Track listing ==
1. "Rain" (Parfitt) (4.33)
2. "You Lost the Love" (Rossi/Young) (2.58)

== Charts ==
Chart (1976)	Peak position
Australian Singles (Kent Music Report)	40
Belgium (Ultratop 50 Flanders)	10
Belgium (Ultratop 50 Wallonia)	29
French Singles (SNEP)	35
Germany (GfK)	27
Ireland (IRMA)	14
Switzerland (Schweizer Hitparade)	8
UK Singles (OCC)	7
