= Jam Side Down =

2002 single by Status Quo

Single by Status Quo

from the album Heavy Traffic
- Released: 5 August 2002
- Length: 3:27
- Label: Universal
- Songwriter(s): Terry Britten, Charlie Dore
- Producer(s): Mike Paxman

Status Quo singles chronology
"Old Time Rock and Roll" (2001)	"Jam Side Down" (2002)	"All Stand Up" (2002)

"Jam Side Down" is a single released by the British rock band Status Quo in August 2002. It was included on the album Heavy Traffic. The song reached number 17 on the UK Singles Chart and number 12 in Scotland. Status Quo made a video of this song together with the Royal Navy, on board the aircraft carrier HMS Ark Royal escorted by destroyers.

== Track listings ==
UK CD1

1. "Jam Side Down (Britten, Dore) – 3:27
2. "The Madness (Parfitt, Edwards) – 3:55
3. "Jam Side Down" (CD-ROM video) (filmed aboard HMS Ark Royal) – 3:27

UK CD2

1. "Jam Side Down (Britten, Dore) – 3:27
2. "Down Down" (recorded live at Top of the Pops 2, 22 November 2000) (Rossi, Young) – 5:00
3. "Rockin' All Over the World" (recorded live at Top of the Pops 2, 22 November 2000) (Fogerty) – 3:45

== Charts ==
Chart (2002)	Peak position
Europe (Eurochart Hot 100)	72
Scotland (OCC)	12
UK Singles (OCC)	17
