= Paper Plane (song) =

1972 song by Status Quo

Single by Status Quo

from the album Piledriver
- B-side: "Softer Ride"
- Released: 10 November 1972
- Recorded: 1972
- Genre: Hard rock; boogie rock
- Length: 3:00
- Label: Vertigo
- Songwriters: Francis Rossi; Bob Young
- Producer: Status Quo

Status Quo singles chronology
"Tune to the Music" (1971)	"Paper Plane" (1972)	"Mean Girl" (1973)

Official video
- "Paper Plane" on YouTube

"Paper Plane" is a rock song originally by Status Quo. It was released as a single on 10 November 1972, reaching number 8 in the UK Singles Chart, and appeared on their album, Piledriver. The song was written by Francis Rossi and Bob Young.

The song was reprised, in 2014, for the band's thirty-first studio album Aquostic (Stripped Bare). It was featured in the ninety-minute launch performance of the album at London's Roundhouse on 22 October, the concert being recorded and broadcast live by BBC Radio 2 as part of their In Concert series.

In 2007 the song was covered by Persephone's Bees.

== Singles ==
- 1972: Paper Plane / Softer Ride [p] 45 rpm Vinyl 7"; Vertigo / 6059 071 United Kingdom
- 1972: Paper Plane / All the Reasons 45 rpm Vinyl 7"; A&M United States
- 1972: Paper Plane / Don't Waste My Time 45 rpm Vinyl 7"; Vertigo / SFL-1792 Japan

== Charts ==
Chart (1973)	Peak position
Ireland (IRMA)	11
New Zealand (Listener)	20
UK Singles (Official Charts)	8
West Germany (GfK)	42
