= In the Army Now (song) =

1986 single by Status Quo

"You're in the Army Now"

Single by Bolland & Bolland

from the album The Domino Theory
- B-side: "The Domino Theory Theme"
- Released: 1981
- Length: 3:15
- Label: TELDEC
- Songwriters: Rob Bolland; Ferdi Bolland
- Producers: Rob Bolland; Ferdi Bolland

Bolland & Bolland singles chronology
"Way Back in the Sixties" (1980)	"You're in the Army Now" (1981)	"Cambodia Moon" (1982)

"You're in the Army Now" is a song by the South African-born Dutch duo Bolland & Bolland, released in 1981. The song spent six consecutive weeks on the top of the Norwegian singles chart. A cover by British rock band Status Quo, simplified as "In the Army Now", was internationally successful in 1986.

== Charts ==
Weekly chart performance for "You're in the Army Now"
Chart (1982)	Peak position
Finland (Suomen virallinen lista)	1
Norway (VG-lista)	1
Sweden (Sverigetopplistan)	2
South Africa (Springbok Radio)	9

== Status Quo version ==
"In the Army Now"

Single by Status Quo

from the album In the Army Now
- B-side: "Heartburn"
- Released: 22 September 1986
- Genre: Arena rock
- Length: 4:40; 3:52 (single version)
- Label: Vertigo
- Songwriters: Rob Bolland; Ferdi Bolland
- Producer: Pip Williams

Status Quo singles chronology
"Red Sky" (1986)	"In the Army Now" (1986)	"Dreamin'" (1986)

Music video
- "In the Army Now" on YouTube

In 1986, British rock band Status Quo covered "In the Army Now" on their 1986 album of the same name. Their version added a prominent synth riff and changed the line "Smiling faces on the way to 'Nam" to "Smiling faces as you wait to land", thus removing the explicit reference to the Vietnam War. The version peaked at number 2 in the UK Singles Chart. It reached the top of the charts in German-speaking Europe as well as Ireland, whilst peaking highly in Norway, Spain and Sweden.

In September 2010, Status Quo released a new version of the song with the Corps of Army Choir through their label Universal/UMC as a special release. The lyrics were further changed to a pro-soldier version. This version charted at no. 31 in the UK Singles charts upon its release. All profits from this updated version were donated equally to the British Forces Foundation and Help for Heroes charities.

=== Track listings ===
7-inch single

1. "In the Army Now" (Bolland/Bolland) – 3:52
2. "Heartburn" (Patrick/Parfitt/Rossi) – 4:44

12-inch maxi

A1. "In the Army Now" (military mix) – 5:55
B1. "Heartburn" (Patrick/Parfitt/Rossi) – 4:44
B2. "Late Last Night" (Young/Parfitt/Rossi) – 2:58

=== Charts ===
==== Weekly charts ====
1986–1987 weekly chart performance for "In the Army Now"
Chart (1986–1987)	Peak position
Austria (Ö3 Austria Top 40)	1
Belgium (Ultratop 50 Flanders)	15
Europe (European Hot 100 Singles)	5
Finland (Suomen virallinen lista)	20
France (SNEP)	2
Iceland (RÚV)	1
Ireland (IRMA)	1
Netherlands (Dutch Top 40)	11
Netherlands (Single Top 100)	15
Norway (VG-lista)	2
Portugal (AFP)	3
Spain (AFYVE)	2
Sweden (Sverigetopplistan)	6
Switzerland (Schweizer Hitparade)	1
UK Singles (Official Charts)	2
West Germany (GfK)	1

2010 weekly chart performance for "In the Army Now"
Chart (2010)	Peak position
UK Singles (Official Charts)	31

2024 weekly chart performance for "In the Army Now"
Chart (2024)	Peak position
Poland (Polish Airplay Top 100)	43

==== Year-end charts ====
1986 year-end chart performance for "In the Army Now"
Chart (1986)	Position
Europe (European Hot 100 Singles)	90
UK Singles (OCC)	24

1987 year-end chart performance for "In the Army Now"
Chart (1987)	Position
Austria (Ö3 Austria Top 40)	11
Europe (European Hot 100 Singles)	60
France (SNEP)	10
Switzerland (Schweizer Hitparade)	25
West Germany (Media Control)	40

== Certifications and sales ==
Certifications and sales for "In the Army Now"
Region	Certification	Certified units/sales
Denmark (IFPI Danmark)	Gold	45,000^{‡}
France (SNEP)	Gold	500,000^{*}
United Kingdom (BPI)	Silver	250,000^{^}
^{*} Sales figures based on certification alone.^{^} Shipments figures based on certification alone.^{‡} Sales+streaming figures based on certification alone.

== Other covers ==
The song was adapted for the 2012 musical An Officer and a Gentleman, based on the 1982 film; the title and chorus were changed to "In the Navy Now" to fit the plot.

Another cover of "In the Army Now" was released by the Swedish power metal band Sabaton, on their 2012 album Carolus Rex and as a stand-alone digital single in 2016.

== See also ==
- Lists of number-one singles (Austria)
- List of number-one hits of 1986 (Germany)
- List of number-one singles of 1986 (Ireland)
- List of number-one songs in Norway
- List of number-one singles of the 1980s (Switzerland)
