= Francis Rossi =

English rock musician (born 1949)

Francis Rossi OBE
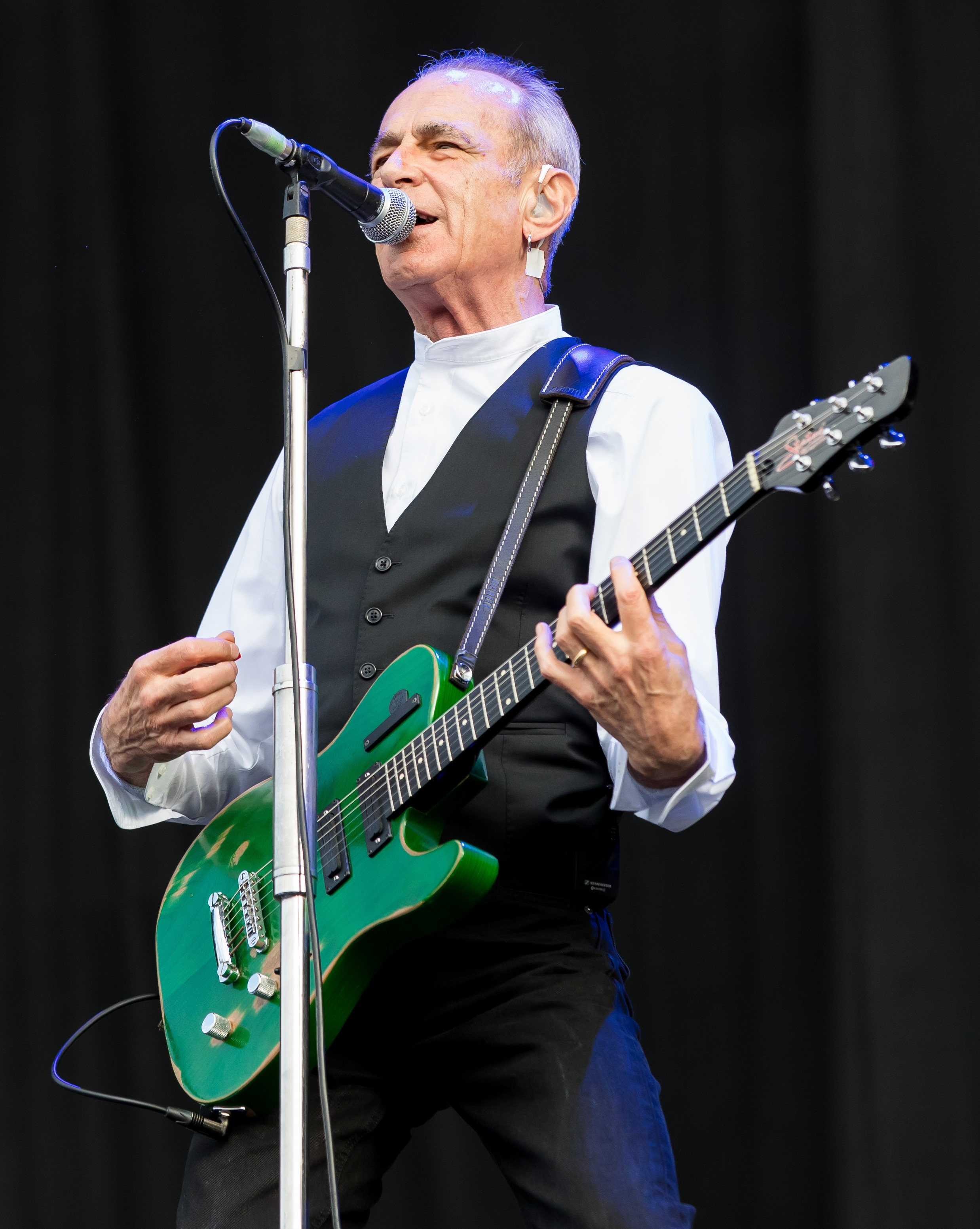
- Rossi performing with Status Quo in 2017

Background information
- Also known as: Mike Rossi, Frame, The GOMOR (The Grand Old Man of Rock)
- Born: Francis Dominic Nicholas Michael Rossi; 29 May 1949 (age 77); Forest Hill, London, England
- Genres: Rock; boogie rock; hard rock; psychedelia
- Occupations: Musician; singer; songwriter
- Instruments: Guitar; vocals
- Years active: 1962–present
- Member of: Status Quo
- Website: francisrossi.com

Francis Dominic Nicholas Michael Rossi OBE (born 29 May 1949) is an English singer, songwriter and musician. He is the founder, leader, lead singer, lead guitarist and sole continuous member of the rock band Status Quo.

== Early life ==
Rossi was born on 29 May 1949 in Forest Hill, London. His father Dominic, trained as a carpenter, before joining the side of the family who were Italian ice cream merchants and had an ice cream business, Candy Store, in Bedford Hill, South London, Rossi recalls working in the shop during his school holidays, from 8am to 8pm. His mother, was from a Northern Irish Roman Catholic background and came from Liverpool. He grew up in a household with his parents, grandmother, and "lots of aunts and uncles" and was given a Roman Catholic upbringing, having been named after Saint Francis of Assisi. He would spend some holidays in Crosby, Merseyside where his maternal grandparents and aunts and uncles lived.

Rossi attended Our Lady and St Philip Neri Roman Catholic Primary School in Sydenham, and then Sedgehill Comprehensive School, where he had trumpet lessons with his two bandmates. He was expelled at age 15, on his last day, for having allowed his classmates to deface his school uniform. He found work as an optician's assistant His desire to become a musician began after watching (with his brother, Dominic) the Everly Brothers live on television at a young age, after which he asked his parents to buy him a guitar for Christmas, his brother opted for a train set.

== Career ==
=== Early career ===
In 1962, while attending Sedgehill Comprehensive School, Rossi became close friends with future Status Quo bassist Alan Lancaster while playing trumpet in the school orchestra. The two, along with other classmates Alan Key (drums) and Jess Jaworski (keyboards), formed a band called the Paladins, who played their first gig at the Samuel Jones Sports Club in Dulwich. Key was later replaced by Air Cadets drummer and future Quo member John Coghlan, and the band was renamed the Spectres. The Spectres wrote their own material and played live shows; the line-up soon included Redhill-based keyboard player Roy Lynes.

In 1965, the Spectres played at a Butlins holiday camp in Minehead. There, Rossi met his future long-time Status Quo partner Rick Parfitt, who was playing as part of another band, the Highlights. The two became close friends and agreed to continue working together. In 1966, the Spectres signed a five-year deal with Piccadilly Records, releasing three singles that failed to chart. The group again changed their name, this time to Traffic Jam, after embracing psychedelia.

=== Status Quo ===
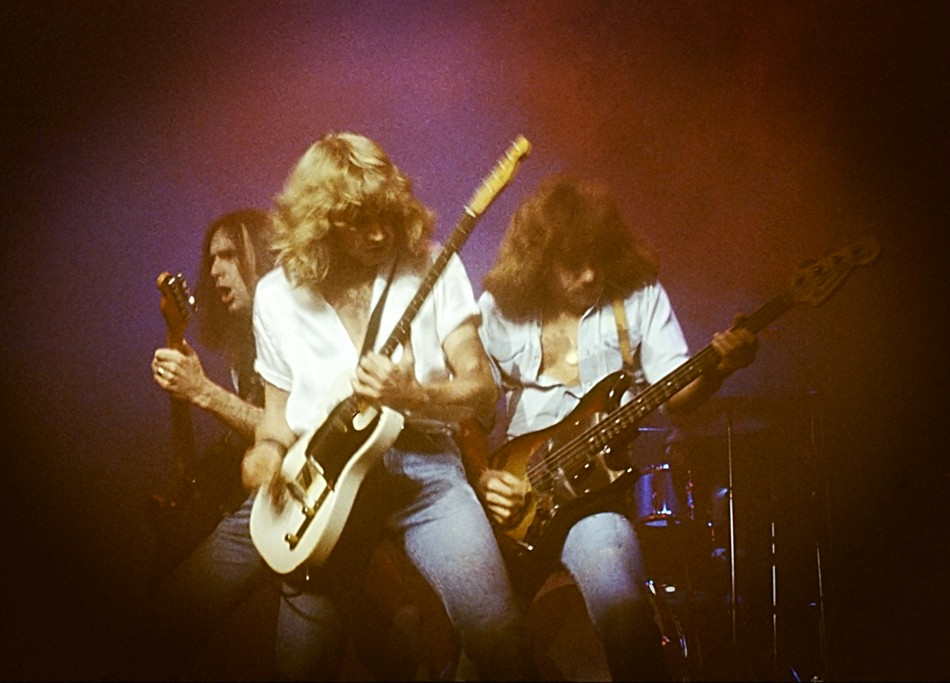
Rossi (far left), with Status Quo in 1978

In 1967, Traffic Jam changed its name to The Status Quo, but eventually dropped the definite article. Shortly afterwards, Parfitt joined the band, completing the original line-up, and beginning an almost 50-year partnership with Rossi until Parfitt's death in 2016. Rossi had written a song called "Pictures of Matchstick Men", which hit the charts in both the UK and the US in 1968, launching their hit-making career. After some years of minor success, the band reached No. 5 in the album charts in 1972 with Piledriver. Released on Vertigo Records, it included "Paper Plane", a song penned by Rossi and Bob Young, which was released as a single.

Status Quo continued to enjoy major success in the UK, Europe, Japan, Australia and New Zealand through the 1970s and 1980s. They were the opening act of 1985's Live Aid, and Rossi wrote and co-wrote some of their biggest hits, including "Caroline" and the band's only number one single, "Down Down".

Early Status Quo albums, up to 1971's Dog of Two Head, credited him as Mike Rossi. Interviewed in 1996, he explained that his own name was deemed "too poncey" by the band's original manager, "so I had to change it to Mike, a real man's name, apparently". Within the band, he is known as "Frame" or "The Gomor" (The Grand Old Man of Rock).

Rossi and Parfitt were the only remaining original members in the band until Parfitt's death in 2016. In 2013 and 2014, Rossi and Parfitt reunited with original Quo bandmates Lancaster and Coghlan for a series of reunion concerts. Over their career, Status Quo have sold over 128 million albums worldwide.

=== Other projects ===
In 1984, the year before Quo opened Live Aid, Rossi and Parfitt appeared on the Band Aid charity single, "Do They Know It's Christmas?" Rossi has also pursued solo projects outside Status Quo. In 1985, when the band was on hold, he recorded two singles with his longtime writing partner Bernie Frost. The single releases were "Modern Romance (I Want to Fall in Love Again)" (UK No. 54), and "Jealousy". In 1996 he issued a solo album, King of the Doghouse, which was not a commercial success, although it produced a UK No. 42 single, "Give Myself to Love".

Some years earlier, in 1976, he had appeared on the soundtrack album and film All This and World War II comprising cover versions of songs by the Beatles. Although the album sleeve credits the performance of "Getting Better" to Status Quo, the track featured Rossi's vocals and the London Symphony Orchestra. In 1977, he produced and played guitar on John Du Cann's solo album The World's Not Big Enough. 3 May 2010 saw the release of his second solo album, One Step at a Time, including a re-recording of Quo's 1973 single "Caroline".

In 2013, Rossi starred as himself alongside Quo bandmate Parfitt in the adventure comedy film Bula Quo!, which followed the duo on an adventure in Fiji, getting involved in local Mafia operations on the island.

In 2019, Rossi released a joint album with UK singer and violinist Hannah Rickard, entitled We Talk Too Much on the earMusic label. The same year, he released his autobiography I Talk Too Much (published by Little, Brown), as well as announcing a spoken word tour of the UK of the same name.

== Equipment ==
Rossi's guitar of choice is the Fender Telecaster, and he has used several over the years, including his trademark green 1957 model with a maple fretboard, which he purchased in 1968. It was originally sunburst, but was painted green in 1970. Through the years, several parts had been replaced with G&L parts, and a third pickup had been installed in a configuration much like a Stratocaster.

Rossi also owns two other green Fender Telecasters that are both brighter in colour and feature rosewood fretboards. One is used for the song "Down Down" and the other for "Whatever You Want". Like his main guitar, they are both in a three-pickup configuration.

In December 2014, Rossi was said to be "heartbroken" when his green 1957 Telecaster, after 46 years of use, became worn beyond use—the wood having become too soft to be able to properly tune the instrument. The guitar was sold at auction in 2019 for £118,813.

For amplification, Rossi uses Marshall JCM800 or JCM900 Lead series amplifiers with 4x12 cabinets and a Roland GP8 to boost his signal. The sound from his Marshall rig is blended with Vox AC30 amplifiers that are kept behind his Marshall setup. He also uses software like Amplitube in the studio.

== Style ==
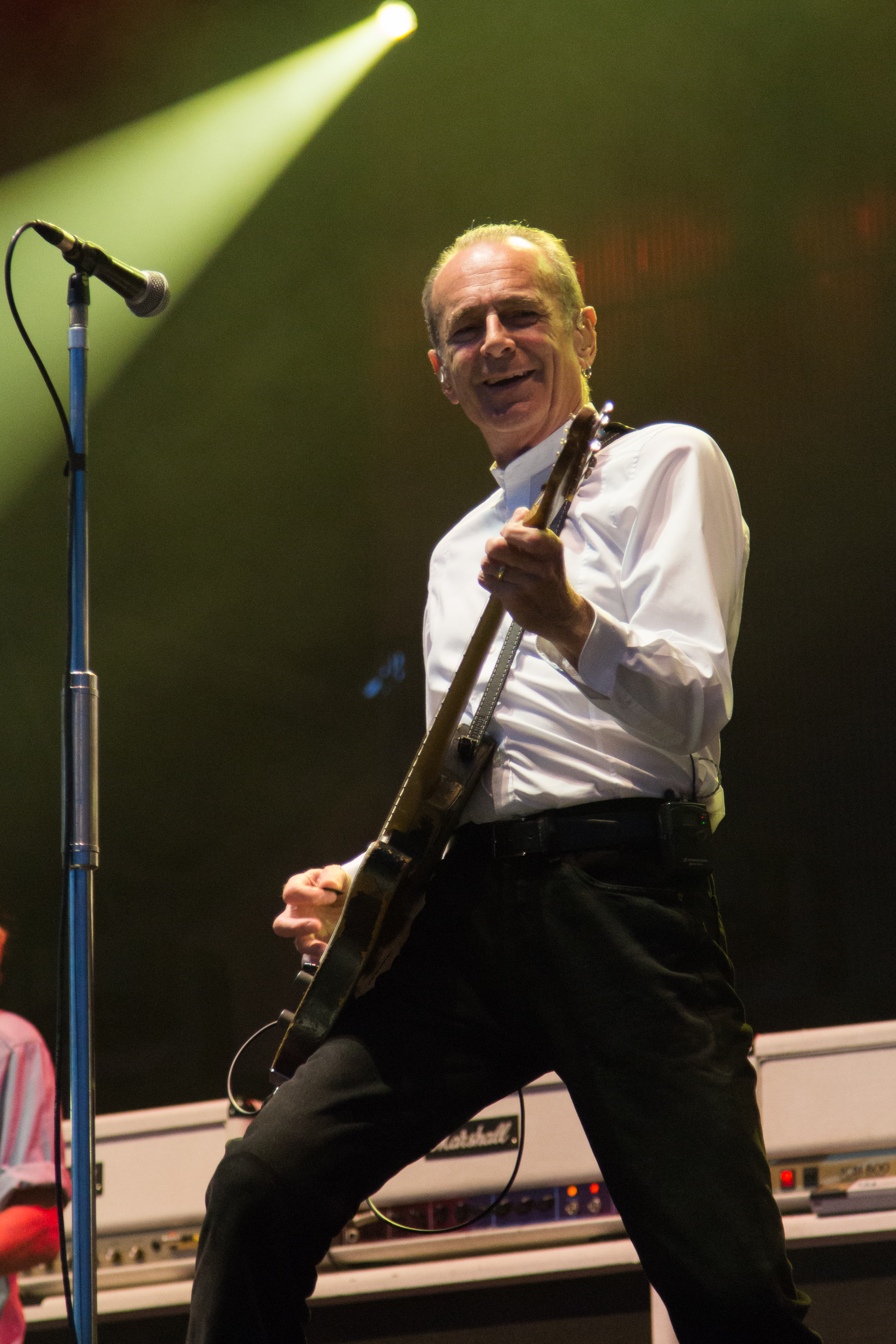
Rossi performing in 2014

Rossi, along with the rest of Status Quo, has often been described as "uncool", including by Rossi himself; in March 2013, he called the Status Quo of c. 1974 "the most uncool band in the world". On stage, Rossi normally sported a black waistcoat, blue jeans and a pair of white trainers. In a December 2000 review of a Status Quo concert at Wembley Arena, Andrew Gilchrist writing for The Guardian called the white trainers "the only "visual" [the band] really have".

Interviewed by Simon Hattenstone for The Guardian in 2007, Rossi said that he had idolised Little Richard, saying: "I think that's where we got the energy. To me it's synonymous with doing rock'n'roll. If you don't commit physically, rock'n'roll doesn't really work."

== Personal life ==
Rossi married his first wife, Jean Smith, when she fell pregnant with the first of their three sons. Jean inspired the lyrics of the hit, Matchstick Men, and they divorced in 1979. He had a subsequent relationship which produced a daughter, Bernadette. He married his second wife, Eileen, in 1989, with whom he has four sons. Interviewed in 2011, he said that all eight of his children played music professionally.

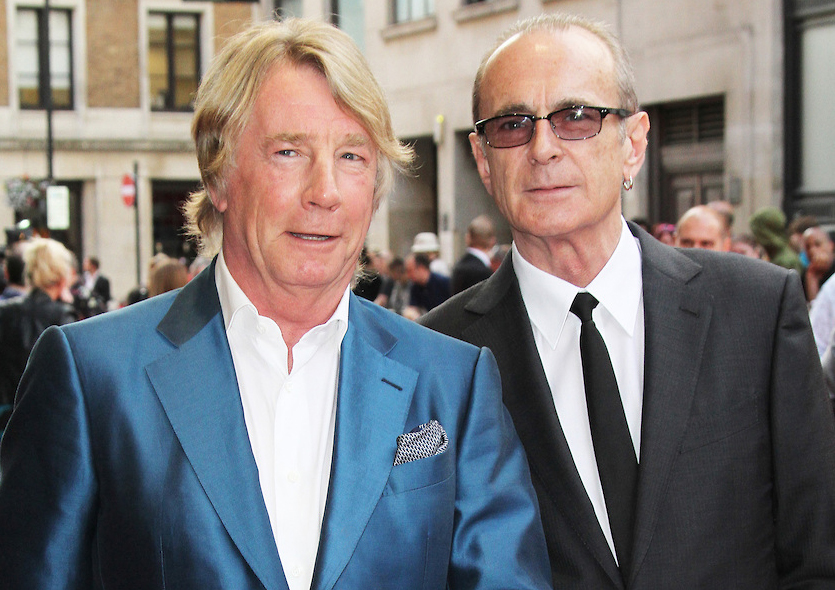
Rossi (right) and long-time Status Quo partner Rick Parfitt in 2013, at the premiere of Bula Quo!

Rossi was estranged from his daughter for seventeen years after his relationship with rock publicist Elizabeth Gernon broke up. They reunited in 2007, and her band Bernadette and The North supported Status Quo on that year's tour.

In 2019 his autobiography, I Talk Too Much, was published by the Little, Brown Book Group. Rossi refers to himself as a lapsed Catholic.

Rossi was known for his long ponytail, which he started growing in around 1974. After 35 years, Rossi cut the ponytail off in 2009, when he noticed his hair was progressively thinning as he was approaching his 60th birthday. "It looked fabulous - I felt like a fashion icon! But in the past few years my hair has got so thin that there's not enough to work into a decent ponytail. A few weeks ago it dawned on me that I looked ridiculous. So I decided to forget about clinging to my youth and it was time to grow old gracefully. When it came off I was horrified to look at these six inches of wizened grey strands. I realised I must have looked really stupid." (Rossi, 2009 interview)

=== Addictions ===
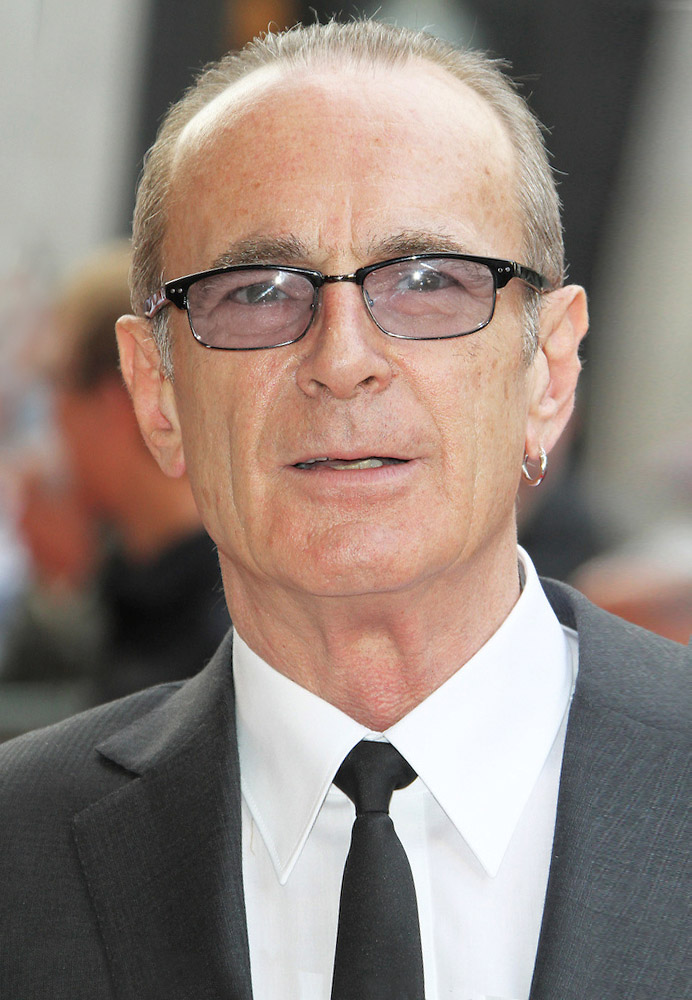
Rossi in 2013

After years of excess, Rossi is teetotal and no longer takes drugs. Rossi claimed to have spent £1.7 million on cocaine in the 1980s. This heavy cocaine use resulted in a piece of his nasal septum falling out, leaving a hole inside his nose which he once "pushed a cotton bud through during a TV interview" in order to demonstrate the dangers of drug addiction to young people. In October 2014, Rossi told BBC's HARDtalk that alcohol was the gateway that led to his cocaine habit. Despite no longer drinking alcohol, in 2010 Rossi became chairman of the 196-year-old Glen Rossie brand of whisky, which the band used to drink whilst on tour.

== Accolades ==
Rossi was appointed Officer of the Order of the British Empire (OBE) in the 2010 New Year Honours for services to music and charity, along with Parfitt. Rossi said "It's one thing going out to play in front of 50,000 people but talking to the Queen – well that's quite another. We were both so humbled by the experience. I mean, this is the Queen after all. She is England, isn't she? We have grown up with her as our figurehead since we were tiny children and she's still going strong at 83. Not a very rock and roll thing to say I know, but she is simply amazing."

== Discography ==
- King of the Doghouse (1996)
- One Step at a Time (2010)
- Live At St. Lukes (2011)
- We Talk Too Much (2019)
- The Way We Were Vol. 1 (2025)
- The Accidental (2026)
- The Way We Were Vol.2 (2026)
