= BT discography =

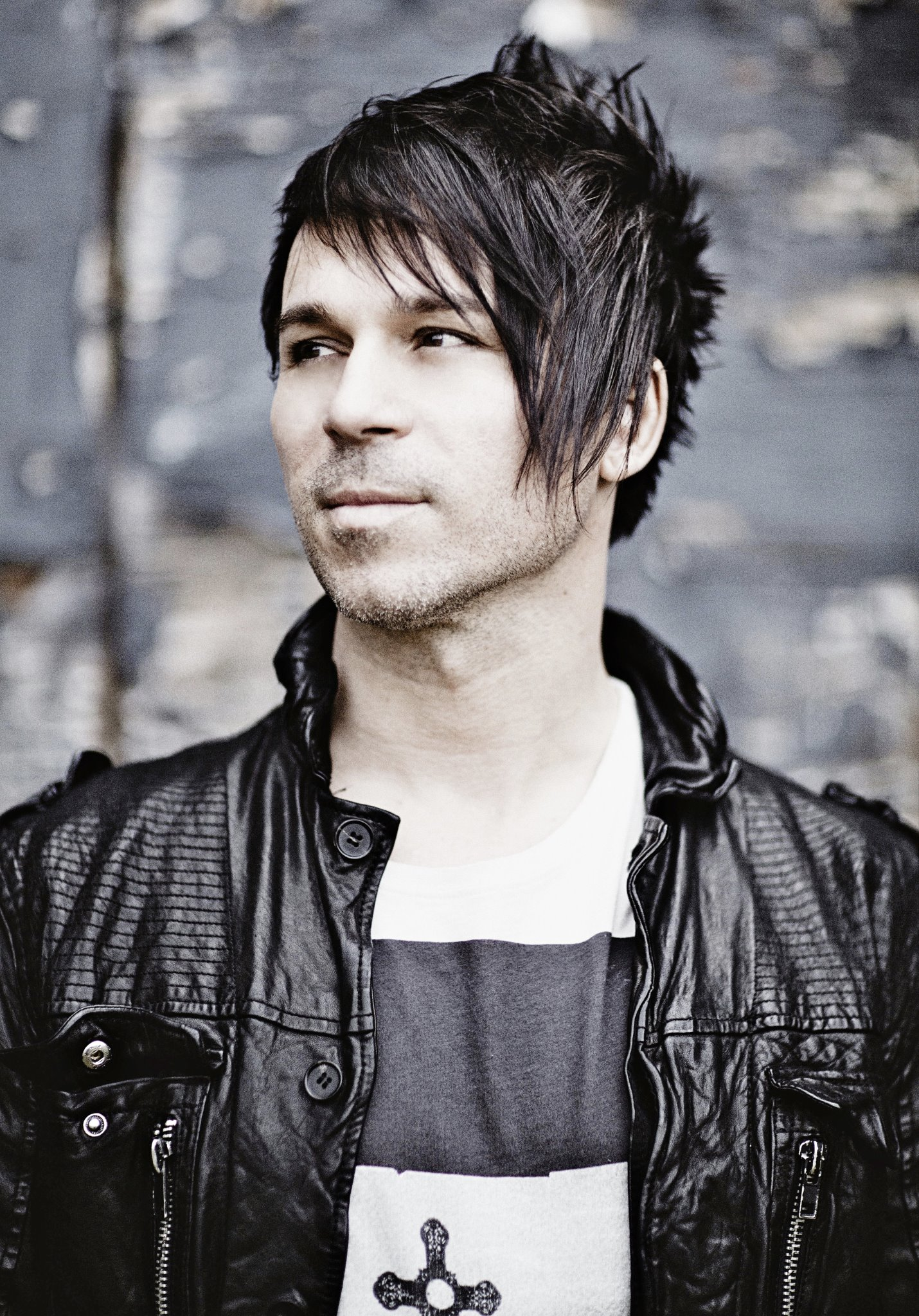
- BT in 2009
- Studio albums: 15
- Extended plays: 5
- Soundtrack albums: 16
- Compilation albums: 4
- Singles: 39
- Music videos: 28
- Remix albums: 3

The discography of the American electronic musician BT consists of 15 studio albums, 4 compilation albums, 5 extended plays, 39 singles, 28 music videos, and 16 soundtracks.

== Albums ==
=== Studio albums ===
Title	Album details	Peak chart positions					
Title	Album details	US	US Dance	US Heat.	US Ind.	US Sales	UK
Ima	Released: October 9, 1995; Label: Perfecto, Reprise, Kinetic; Format: CD, cassette, digital download, vinyl	—	—	—	—	—	45
ESCM	Released: September 22, 1997; Label: Perfecto, Reprise; Format: CD, cassette, digital download, vinyl	—	—	—	—	—	35
Movement in Still Life	Released: October 8, 1999; Label: Nettwerk, Pioneer; Format: CD, digital download, vinyl	166	—	8	—	166	87
Emotional Technology	Released: August 5, 2003; Label: Nettwerk; Format: CD, digital download, vinyl	138	1	3	—	138	—
This Binary Universe	Released: August 29, 2006; Label: Binary Acoustics, DTS; Format: CD, digital download	—	4	17	24	—	—
These Hopeful Machines	Released: February 2, 2010; Label: Binary Acoustics, Nettwerk; Format: CD, digital download	154	6	2	—	154	—
If the Stars Are Eternal So Are You and I	Released: June 19, 2012; Label: Nettwerk; Format: CD, digital download	—	—	—	—	—	—
Morceau Subrosa	Released: June 19, 2012; Label: Nettwerk; Format: CD, digital download	—	—	—	—	—	—
A Song Across Wires	Released: August 16, 2013; Label: Armada; Format: CD, digital download	—	5	7	44	—	—
_	Released: October 14, 2016; Label: Black Hole; Format: Digital download, USB	—	9	—	—	—	—
Between Here and You	Released: October 18, 2019; Label: Black Hole; Format: CD, digital download	—	—	—	—	—	—
Everything You're Searching for Is on the Other Side of Fear	Released: December 13, 2019; Label: Black Hole; Format: CD, digital download	—	—	—	—	—	—
The Lost Art of Longing	Released: August 14, 2020; Label: Black Hole; Format: CD, digital download	—	—	—	—	—	—
Metaversal	Released: November 19, 2021; Label: Black Hole; Format: Digital	—	—	—	—	—	—
The Secret Language of Trees	Released: July 11, 2023; Label: Monstercat; Format: Digital	—	—	—	—	—	—
"—" denotes a recording that did not chart or was not released in that territory.

=== Compilation albums ===
Title	Album	Peak chart positions		
Title	Album	US Elec.	US Heat.	US Ind.
R&R (Rare & Remixed)	Released: October 23, 2001; Label: Nettwerk; Format: CD, digital download	10	20	—
10 Years in the Life	Released: September 10, 2002; Label: Sire; Format: CD	14	—	49
These Humble Machines	Released: April 26, 2011; Label: Nettwerk; Format: CD, digital download	20	—	—
Laptop Symphony	Released: May 14, 2012; Label: Black Hole; Format: CD, digital download	16	41	—
"—" denotes a recording that did not chart or was not released in that territory.

=== Remix albums ===
Title	Album details	Peak chart positions	
Title	Album details	US Elec.	US Heat.
Still Life in Motion	Released: November 6, 2001; Label: Musicrama / Koch; Format: CD, digital download, vinyl	—	—
These Re-Imagined Machines	Released: May 30, 2011; Label: Black Hole / New State / Nettwerk; Format: CD, digital download	16	41
Electronic Opus	Released: October 12, 2015; Label: Binary Acoustics; Format: CD, digital download, Blu-ray	—	—
"—" denotes a recording that did not chart or was not released in that territory.

== Extended plays ==
Title	EP details
Relativity	Released: 1993; Label: Deep Dish Records; Format: Vinyl
Moment of Truth	Released: 1993; Label: Deep Dish Records; Format: Vinyl
Turn Me On	Released: 1999; Label: Headspace; Format: CD
Movement	Released: June 1, 2000; Label: Phobos Recordings; Format: Vinyl
Extended Movement	Released: June 1, 2000; Label: Nettwerk; Format: CD, digital download
The Technology	Released: April 20, 2004; Label: Nettwerk; Format: CD, vinyl
Human Technology	Released: November 14, 2005; Label: Human Imprint Recordings; Format: Vinyl

== Singles ==
=== As lead artist ===
Title	Year	Peak chart positions						Album
Title	Year	US	US Alt.	US Dance	AUS	UK	UK Dance	Album
"Oneday" (with Fawn and Vincent Covello)	1992	—	—	—	—	—	—	Non-album single
"Embracing the Future"	1993	—	—	—	—	—	—	Ima
"Beta (3AM Mix)"	1994	—	—	—	—	—	—	Non-album single
"Nocturnal Transmission"	1994	—	—	—	—	—	—	Ima
"La Chakra Sexuelle" (as Elastic Chakra; with Taylor)	1995	—	—	—	—	—	—	Non-album singles
"Transway" (as Dharma; with John Selway)	1995	—	—	—	—	—	—	Non-album singles
"Embracing the Sunshine"	1995	—	—	—	—	34	1	Ima
"Loving You More" (featuring Vincent Covello)	1995	—	—	18	—	14	2	Ima
"Blue Skies" (featuring Tori Amos)	1996	—	—	1	93	26	2	Ima
"Flaming June"	1997	—	—	—	—	19	1	ESCM
"Remember" (featuring Jan Johnston)	1997	—	—	1	—	27	7	ESCM
"Love, Peace and Grease"	1997	—	—	5	—	41	13	ESCM
"The Promethean Groove" (as Kaistar)	1998	—	—	—	—	—	—	Non-album single
"Godspeed"	1998	—	—	10	—	54	2	Movement in Still Life
"Dreaming" (featuring Kirsty Hawkshaw)	1999	—	—	5	—	38	6	Movement in Still Life
"Mercury and Solace" (featuring Jan Johnston)	1999	—	—	—	56	38	4	Movement in Still Life
"Never Gonna Come Back Down" (with Mike Doughty)	2000	—	16	9	—	51	14	Movement in Still Life
"Fibonacci Sequence"	2000	—	—	—	—	—	—	Movement in Still Life
"Smartbomb" (featuring Rasco)	2001	—	—	—	—	—	—	Movement in Still Life
"Somnambulist (Simply Being Loved)" (featuring JC Chasez)	2003	98	—	5	—	—	—	Emotional Technology
"The Rose of Jericho"	2009	—	—	6	—	—	—	These Hopeful Machines
"Every Other Way" (featuring JES)	2009	—	7	7	—	—	—	These Hopeful Machines
"Suddenly" (featuring Christian Burns)	2010	—	—	18	—	—	—	These Hopeful Machines
"The Wobble (Rocket Car)"	2010	—	—	—	—	—	—	Non-album single
"Forget Me" (featuring Christian Burns)	2010	—	—	—	—	—	—	These Hopeful Machines
"The Emergency" (featuring Andrew Bayer)	2010	—	—	3	—	—	—	These Hopeful Machines
"Le Nocturne de Lumière"	2010	—	—	—	—	—	—	These Hopeful Machines
"Always" (featuring Rob Dickinson)	2011	—	—	—	—	—	—	These Hopeful Machines
"A Million Stars" (featuring Kirsty Hawkshaw)	2011	—	—	—	—	—	—	These Hopeful Machines
"In the Air" (with Morgan Page and Sultan & Shepard featuring Angela McCluskey)	2011	—	—	6	—	—	—	In the Air
"Tomahawk" (featuring Adam K)	2011	—	—	—	—	—	—	A Song Across Wires
"Must Be the Love" (featuring Nadia Ali)	2012	—	—	—	—	—	—	A Song Across Wires
"Partysaurus Overflow"	2012	—	—	—	—	—	—	Partysaurus Rex
"Vervoeren"	2012	—	—	—	—	—	—	A Song Across Wires
"Skylarking"	2013	—	—	—	—	—	—	A Song Across Wires
"Surrounded" (featuring Aqualung)	2013	—	—	—	—	—	—	A Song Across Wires
"Letting Go" (featuring JES)	2014	—	—	—	—	—	—	A Song Across Wires
"Theme for an Untitled Film"	2014	—	—	—	—	—	—	Non-album singles
"Paralyzed" (featuring Christian Burns)	2014	—	—	—	—	—	—	Non-album singles
"All These Wounds"	2015	—	—	—	—	—	—	Non-album singles
"The Upside Down"	2017	—	—	—	—	—	—	Non-album singles
"LSTM"	2017	—	—	—	—	—	—	Non-album singles
"Four"	2017	—	—	—	—	—	—	Non-album singles
"Yahweh"	2017	—	—	—	—	—	—	Non-album singles
"The Noetic" (with Matt Fax)	2018	—	—	—	—	—	—	Non-album singles
"1997" (with Ferry Corsten)	2019	—	—	—	—	—	—	Non-album singles
"I Need Love" (with Markus Schulz)	2019	—	—	—	—	—	—	Non-album singles
"Atari's Lantern"	2020	—	—	—	—	—	—	Non-album singles
"1AM in Paris / The War" (with Matt Fax and Iraina Mancini)	2020	—	—	—	—	—	—	The Lost Art of Longing
"No Warning Lights" (featuring Emma Hewitt)	2020	—	—	—	—	—	—	The Lost Art of Longing
"Walk into the Water" (with Matt Fax and Nation of One)	2020	—	—	—	—	—	—	The Lost Art of Longing
"Never Odd or Even"	2021	—	—	—	—	—	—	The Lost Art of Longing
"Here" (with Maor Levi and Nation of One)	2021	—	—	—	—	—	—	Non-album single
"The Light Is Always On"	2021	—	—	—	—	—	—	The Lost Art of Longing
"Windows" (featuring April Bender)	2021	—	—	—	—	—	—	The Lost Art of Longing
"Wildfire" (featuring Brenna MacQuarrie)	2021	—	—	—	—	—	—	The Lost Art of Longing
"Where the Sun Meets the Sea"	2022	—	—	—	—	—	—	Metaversal
"Run" (with Ilan Bluestone and Caitlin Charters)	2022	—	—	—	—	—	—	Non-album singles
"Prestwick" (with Markus Schulz)	2022	—	—	—	—	—	—	Non-album singles
"k-means clustering"	2023	—	—	—	—	—	—	The Secret Language of Trees
"Lifeforce" (with Shingo Nakamura)	2024	—	—	—	—	—	—	Solace
"Vertical" (with Matt Fax)	2024	—	—	—	—	—	—	Non-album single
"—" denotes a recording that did not chart or was not released in that territory.

=== As featured artist ===
Title	Year	Peak chart positions								Album
Title	Year	US Dance	BEL	FIN	GER	NED	SWI	UK	UK Dance	Album
"Love Comes Again" (Tiësto featuring BT)	2004	15	6	12	64	3	94	30	1	Just Be
"Break My Fall" (Tiësto featuring BT)	2007	—	—	7	35	13	—	—	—	Elements of Life
"—" denotes a recording that did not chart or was not released in that territory.

=== Promotional singles ===
Title	Year	Album
"Divinity"	1995	Ima
"Quark"	1995	Ima
"Namistai" (with Paul van Dyk)	1999	Movement in Still Life
"Shame"	2000	Movement in Still Life

== Soundtracks ==
=== Films ===
Year	Title	Director	Distributor	Notes
1999	Go	Doug Liman	Columbia Pictures	—N/a
2000	Under Suspicion	Stephen Hopkins	Lions Gate Entertainment	—N/a
2001	Driven	Renny Harlin	Warner Bros.	—N/a
2001	The Fast and the Furious	Rob Cohen	Universal Pictures	—N/a
2004	Monster	Patty Jenkins	Newmarket Films	—N/a
2005	Harnessing Speed	Todd Grossman	Columbia Pictures	—N/a
2005	Stealth	Rob Cohen	Columbia Pictures	—N/a
2005	Underclassman	Marcos Siega	Miramax Films	—N/a
2007	Catch and Release	Susannah Grant	Columbia Pictures	—N/a
2007	Look	Adam Rifkin	Captured Films	with sound designer Richard Devine
2008	Pixar presents Cars: Tokyo Mater	John Lasseter	Walt Disney Pictures	Pixar short film
2012	Partysaurus Rex	Mark Walsh	Walt Disney Studios Motion Pictures	Pixar short film
2015	Dark Places	Gilles Paquet-Brenner	A24 Films	—N/a
2015	Solace	Afonso Poyart	Lionsgate Premiere	—N/a
2016	Mais Forte que o Mundo	Afonso Poyart	Downtown and Paris Films	—N/a
2017	Ittefaq	Abhay Chopra	Red Chillies Entertainment	—N/a

=== Television ===
Year	Title	Director	Distributor	Notes
2013	Betrayal	David Zabel	ABC	Season 1 of the TV series
2015	Wicked City	Steven Baigelman	ABC	Season 1 of the TV series
2018	Philip K. Dick's Electric Dreams	Peter Horton	Amazon Video	Episode: "Autofac", with Mark Isham

=== Video games ===
Year	Title	Developer	Publisher	Notes
1999	Die Hard Trilogy 2: Viva Las Vegas	N-Space	Fox Interactive	—N/a
2002	Wreckless: The Yakuza Missions	Bunkasha	Activision	—N/a
2004	Tiger Woods PGA Tour 2005	EA Sports	Electronic Arts	—N/a
2010	Alpha Protocol	Obsidian Entertainment	Sega	Theme song (with Jason Graves)
2010	EA Sports Active 2	EA Canada	EA Sports	—N/a
2024	TopSpin 2K25	Hangar 13	2K	—N/a
2025	Mafia: The Old Country	Hangar 13	2K	—N/a

== Songs appearances ==
=== Films ===
Year	Title	Songs	Notes
1995	Hackers	"Remember" "Godspeed (BT Edit)"	Included not in the film, but in the soundtrack, particularly in the albums Hackers 2: Music from and Inspired by the Original Motion Picture 'Hackers' and Hackers 3
1996	Twister	"Talula (The Tornado Mix)" "Talula (BT's Synethasia Mix)" "Talula (BT Mix)"	
1997	Mortal Kombat Annihilation	"Anomaly – Calling Your Name"	Under the pseudonym Libra Presents Taylor
1997	The Jackal	"Shineaway"	with Richard Butler
1998	Permanent Midnight	"Godspeed"	—N/a
1999	American Pie	"Anomaly – Calling Your Name"	
2000	The Art of Dying	"Solar Plexus"	—N/a
2000	Gone in 60 Seconds	"Never Gonna Come Back Down"	—N/a
2000	Bounce	"Never Gonna Come Back Down"	—N/a
2000	Miss Congeniality	"She's a Lady"	—N/a
2001	Driven	"Satellite"	—N/a
2001	Double Take	"Movement in Still Life"	—N/a
2001	Lara Croft: Tomb Raider	"The Revolution"	—N/a
2001	The Fast and the Furious	"Nocturnal Transmission"	—N/a
2001	3000 Miles to Graceland	"Smartbomb"	—N/a
2001	Zoolander	"Madskillz-Mic Chekka (Remix)"	Uncredited
2001	Sweet November	"Shame (Ben Grosse Remix)"	—N/a
2001	Valentine	"Smartbomb (BT Mix)"	—N/a
2002	Highway	"Madskillz-Mic Chekka"	—N/a
2002	Half Past Dead	"Smartbomb"	—N/a
2002	Blade II	"Tao of the Machine"	with The Roots
2002	Ballistic: Ecks vs. Sever	"Smartbomb (Plump DJs Remix)"	—N/a
2002	The Truth About Charlie	"Stealth and Rhythm"	—N/a
2002	Extreme Ops	"Revolution"	—N/a
2002	Cold Fusion	"Madskillz-Mic Chekka"	—N/a
2003	The Core	"Sunblind"	—N/a
2004	Raising Helen	"Superfabulous"	—N/a
2004	Win a Date with Tad Hamilton!	"Superfabulous (Scott Humphrey Radio Mix)"	—N/a
2005	Let the Love Begin	"Somnambulist (Simply Being Loved)"	—N/a
2005	Stealth	"She Can (Do That)"	with David Bowie
2005	Domino	"P A R I S"	—N/a
2007	Battle in Seattle	Additional music	—N/a
2009	Into the Blue 2: The Reef	"Blue Skies"	—N/a
2010	The Sorcerer's Apprentice	"Le Nocturne de Lumière"	

=== Television ===
Year	Title	Songs	Notes
1995	Party of Five	"Blue Skies"	Episode: "Life's Too Short"; uncredited
2000	Nash Bridges	"Smartbomb"	Episode: "Blowout"; uncredited
2003	Smallville	"Never Gonna Come Back Down"	—N/a
2004	NCIS	"Somnambulist (Simply Being Loved)"	—N/a
2004	Six Feet Under	"Somnambulist (Simply Being Loved)"	—N/a
2004	Kevin Hill	Theme music	Episode: "Homework"
2004	CSI: Miami	"Kimosabe"	Episode: "Under the Influence"
2005	Queer Eye for the Straight Girl	Theme music	13 episodes
2005	Lincoln	"The Revolution"	146 episodes from October 2005 to March 2009

=== Video games ===
Year	Title	Developer	Publisher	Songs	Notes
2000	ESPN Winter X Games Snowboarding	Konami	Konami	"Smartbomb"	—N/a
2001	FreQuency	Harmonix	Sony Computer Entertainment	"Smartbomb"	—N/a
2001	SSX Tricky	EA Canada	EA Sports	"Smartbomb (Plump's Vocal Mix)" "Hip Hop Phenomenon"	with Tsunami One
2001	Gran Turismo 3: A-Spec	Polyphony Digital	Sony Computer Entertainment	"Madskillz-Mic Chekka"	—N/a
2001	FIFA Football 2002	EA Canada	Electronic Arts	"Never Gonna Come Back Down (Hybrid's Echoplex Dub Mix)"	—N/a
2002	Wipeout Fusion	Studio Liverpool	Sony Computer Entertainment	"Smartbomb (Plump DJs Remix)"	—N/a
2002	ATV Offroad Fury 2	Rainbow Studios	Sony Computer Entertainment	"The Revolution"	—N/a
2003	Need for Speed: Underground	EA Black Box	EA Games	"Kimosabe"	with Wildchild
2003	Amplitude	Harmonix	Sony Computer Entertainment	"Kimosabe"	with Wildchild
2003	XGRA: Extreme G Racing Association	Acclaim Cheltenham	Acclaim Entertainment	"Dreaming" "Godspeed" "Never Gonna Come Back Down" "Mercury & Solace" "Running Down the Way Up" "Smartbomb" "Madskillz"	—N/a
2004	Dance Dance Revolution Extreme	Konami	Konami	"Simply Being Loved (Somnambulist)"	—N/a
2005	Need for Speed: Most Wanted	EA Black Box; EA Redwood Shores	Electronic Arts	"Tao of the Machine (Scott Humphrey's Remix)"	with The Roots
2005	Burnout Revenge	Criterion Games	Electronic Arts	"Break On Through (BT Mix)"	Credited as BT vs. The Doors
2008	We Cheer	Machatin	Namco Bandai Games; 505 Games	"Godspeed"	—N/a
2011	NBA Jam: On Fire Edition	EA Canada	EA Sports	"Moon Safari"	—N/a
2012	Lumines Electronic Symphony	Q Entertainment	Ubisoft	"Embracing the Future"	—N/a
2024	TopSpin 2K25	Hangar 13	2K	"Windows"	with April Bender

== Collaborations ==
Artist	Song(s)	Year	Album	Notes
Adam K	"Tomahawk"	2011	A Song Across Wires	
Andrew Bayer	"The Emergency"	2010	These Hopeful Machines	
Angela McCluskey	"In the Air"	2011	In the Air	
April Bender	"Windows"	2020	The Lost Art of Longing	
Aqualung	"Surrounded"	2013	A Song Across Wires	
Armin van Buuren	"These Silent Hearts"	2010	Mirage	In exchange for helping create "These Silent Hearts", Armin van Buuren remixed "Every Other Way".
Armin van Buuren	"Always"	2019	Balance	
Armin van Buuren	"Always" (BT Extended Club Mix)	2020	Balance (Remixes)	
Arty	"Must Be the Love"	2012	A Song Across Wires	
Au5	"Partysaurus Overflow"	2012	Dconstructed	
Au5	"Surrounded" "Letting Go"	2013	A Song Across Wires	
Au5	"The Light Is Always On"	2020	The Lost Art of Longing	
Bada	"City Life"	2013	A Song Across Wires	
Baluji Shrivastav	"Loving You More"	1995	Ima	Only in television programs such as Blue Peter and The White Room
Bassnectar	"Blackwire"	2011	These Re-Imagined Machines	Complete Limited Edition Signed Box Set
Billie Ray Martin	Several tracks and remixes, such as "Your Loving Arms"	1996	Deadline for My Memories	
Blake Lewis	"She's Makin' Me Lose It" "She Loves the Way"	2007	A.D.D. (Audio Day Dream)	Co-production
Britney Spears	"Before the Goodbye"	2001	Britney	On the international version of her album
Britney Spears	"I Run Away"	2001	Britney	BT served as the programmer for the song.
Britney Spears	"When I Say So"	2001	Non-album single	Unreleased song (leaked in 2010)
Caitlin Charters	"Run"	2022	Anjunabeats Volume 16	
Caroline Lavelle	"The Great Escape"	2003	Emotional Technology	
Charlotte Martin	"Sweet Things"	2007	Elements of Life	
Charlotte Martin	"Feed the Monster"	2012	Non-album singles	"Feed the Monster" was mixed by Blue Stahli
Che Malcolm	"Lemon Balm and Chamomile"	2002	Non-album singles	Rare track (unreleased)
Christian Burns	"Suddenly" "The Emergency" "Forget Me"	2010	These Hopeful Machines	
Christian Burns	"Love Divine"	2013	A Song Across Wires	
Christian Burns	"The Enemy"	2013	Simple Modern Answers	
Christian Burns	"Paralyzed"	2014	Non-album single	
Christian Burns	Songs with All Hail the Silence	2019	‡	
Christian Burns	"Red Lights" "Save Me"	2020	The Lost Art of Longing	
Crowder	"American I/O"	2016	American Prodigal	
David Bowie	"(She Can) Do That"	2005	Stealth	
DJ Rap	"Giving Up the Ghost"	1999	Movement in Still Life	
Emma Hewitt	"Calling Your Name"	2013	A Song Across Wires	
Emma Hewitt	"No Warning Lights"	2020	The Lost Art of Longing	
Ferry Corsten	"1997"	2019	Non-album single	
Fractal	"Letting Go" "City Life"	2013	A Song Across Wires	
Gui Boratto	"Hallucination"	2018	Pentagram	
Guru	"Knowledge of Self"	2003	Emotional Technology	
Howard Jones	"The One to Love You" "Transform" "At the Speed of Love"	2019	Transform	
Howard Jones	"Celebrate It Together"	2022	Dialogue	
Hybrid	"Running Down the Way Up" "Godspeed"	1999	Movement in Still Life	
Ilan Bluestone	"All These Wounds" "Run"	2015	Anjunabeats Worldwide 05; Anjunabeats Volume 16	
Iraina Mancini	"The War"	2020	The Lost Art of Longing	
Jan Johnston	"Lullaby for Gaia"	1997	ESCM	Appears only in the US version of the album
Jan Johnston	"Remember"	1997	ESCM	
Jan Johnston	"Sunblind"	1999	Movement in Still Life	Appears only in the Japanese version of the album Also appears in R&R (Rare & Remixed)
Jan Johnston	"Mercury and Solace" "Dreaming"	1999	Movement in Still Life	
Jan Johnston	"Flesh"	2001	Non-album single	
Jan Johnston	"Communicate"	2003	Emotional Technology	
JES	"Every Other Way" "The Light in Things"	2010	These Hopeful Machines	
JES	"Letting Go" "Tonight"	2013	A Song Across Wires	
JC Chasez	"Somnambulist" "Force of Gravity"	2003	Emotional Technology	
Karina Ware	"Last Moment of Clarity"	2003	Emotional Technology	
Kirsty Hawkshaw	"Dreaming" "Running Down the Way Up"	1999	Movement in Still Life	
Kirsty Hawkshaw	"A Million Stars"	2010	These Hopeful Machines	
Lola Rhodes	"If I Can Love You"	2020	The Lost Art of Longing	
Mangal Suvarnan	"The Light Is Always On"	2020	The Lost Art of Longing	
Maor Levi	"Here"	2021	Non-album singles	
Markus Schulz	"I Need Love"	2019	Non-album singles	
Matt Fax	"The Noetic"	2018	Non-album singles	
Matt Fax	"Artificial"	2020	Progressions	
Matt Fax	"1AM in Paris" "The War"	2020	The Lost Art of Longing	
Matt Fax	"Vertical"	2024	Non-album single	
Mike Doughty	"Never Gonna Come Back Down"	1999	Movement in Still Life	
Morgan Page	"In the Air"	2011	In the Air	
Nadia Ali	"Must Be the Love"	2012	A Song Across Wires	
Nation of One	"Always" "Here"	2019; 2021	Balance	
Nation of One	"Walk Into the Water"	2020	The Lost Art of Longing	
Nick Phoenix	Various songs	2005	300 Years Later	
NSync	"Pop"	2001	Celebrity	Co-writing and production
Paul van Dyk	"Flaming June"	1997	ESCM	
Paul van Dyk	"Namasté"	1999	Movement in Still Life	Appears only in the international version of the album
Peter Gabriel	Various songs	2010	OVO	Music for the Millennium Dome New Year's Eve project
Planet Asia	"Madskillz-Mic Chekka"	1999	Movement in Still Life	
Rasco	"Madskillz-Mic Chekka"	1999	Movement in Still Life	
Rasco	"Smartbomb" "Love on Haight Street"	2000	Movement in Still Life	
Richard Butler	"Shineaway"	1997	10 Years in the Life	
Rob Dickinson	"Always" "The Unbreakable"	2010	These Hopeful Machines	
Rose McGowan	"Superfabulous"	2003	Emotional Technology	She also participated in the unreleased song "Lemon Balm and Chamomile".
Sasha	"Sasha's Voyage of Ima"	1995	Ima	
Sasha	"Ride"	1999	Movement in Still Life	
Senadee	"Lifeline"	2013	A Song Across Wires	
Shingo Nakamura	"Lifeforce"	2024	Solace	
Simon Hale	"Firewater" "The Road to Lostwithiel" "Remember"	1997	ESCM	
Stef Lang	"All These Wounds"	2015	Anjunabeats Worldwide 05	
Sultan & Shepard	"In the Air"	2011	In the Air	
Super8 & Tab	"Aika"	2014	Unified	
Tamra Keenan	"Love in the Time of Thieves"	2006	Emotional Technology	
Tania Zygar	"Stem the Tides"	2013	A Song Across Wires	
The Roots	"Tao of the Machine"	2002	Emotional Technology	
Tiësto	"Love Comes Again"	2004	Just Be	In exchange, Tiësto remixed "Force of Gravity".
Tiësto	"Sweet Things" "Bright Morningstar" "Break My Fall"	2007	Elements of Life	
Tommy Stinson	"Superfabulous" "Circles" "Animals" "The Only Constant is Change" "Kimosabe"	2003	Emotional Technology	Bass
Tommy Stinson	Original score for Catch and Release	2006	Film soundtrack	Bass
Tori Amos	"Blue Skies"	1995	Ima	#1 on Billboard Dance Chart
Tritonal	"Calling Your Name" "Paralyzed"	2013; 2014	A Song Across Wires	
Tsunami One (Adam Freeland and Kevin Beber)	"Hip Hop Phenomenon"	2000	Movement in Still Life	
TyDi	"Stem the Tides" "Tonight"	2013	A Song Across Wires	
TyDi	"If I Can Love You"	2020	The Lost Art of Longing	Illingworth was under the alias "Wish I Was" for this song.
Ulrich Schnauss	"A Million Stars"	2010	These Hopeful Machines	
Vincent Covello	"Loving You More"	1995	Ima	
Wildchild	"Kimosabe"	2003	Emotional Technology	

== Remixes ==
Year	Artist	Song	Notes
1995	B-Tribe & Deborah Blando	"Nanita (A Spanish Lullaby)"	
1995	Shiva	"Freedom"	
1995	Diana Ross	"Take Me Higher"	
1995	Cabana	"Bailando con Lobos"	
1995	Grace	"Not Over Yet"	
1995	Wild Colour	"Dreams"	
1995	Mike Oldfield	"Let There Be Light"	
1995	Billie Ray Martin	"Running Around Town"	
1995	Seal	"I'm Alive"	Remixed with Sasha
1996	Gipsy Kings	"La Rumba de Nicolas"	
1996	Billie Ray Martin	"Space Oasis"	
1996	Tori Amos	"Talula"	
1997	Tori Amos	"Putting the Damage On"	Unreleased
1997	Dina Carroll	"Run to You"	
1997	The Crystal Method	"Keep Hope Alive"	
1997	Paul van Dyk	"Forbidden Fruit"	
1997	Deep Dish	"Stranded"	
1997	Madonna	"Drowned World/Substitute for Love"	Remixed with Sasha
1997	Depeche Mode	"It's No Good"	Unreleased
1998	Lenny Kravitz	"If You Can't Say No"	
1998	DJ Rap	"Bad Girl"	
1999	Sarah McLachlan	"I Love You"	
2000	Tom Jones	"She's a Lady"	
2001	Sarah McLachlan	"Hold On"	
2002	KoЯn	"Here to Stay"	
2004	The Doors	"Break On Through (To the Other Side)"	from Burnout Revenge
2009	Shiny Toy Guns	"Ricochet!"	
2011	Armin van Buuren	"Virtual Friend"	
2013	Super8 & Tab	"L.A."	
2013	Celldweller	"Unshakeable"	Remixed with SeamlessR
2014	Erasure	"Elevation"	
2014	BT	"Partysaurus Overflow (Inspired by Partysaurus Rex)"	Remixed with Au5
2018	Death Cab for Cutie	"Northern Lights"	
2020	Armin van Buuren (with BT and Nation of One)	"Always"	
2021	Shingo Nakamura & Brandon Mignacca	"Darling Midnight"	

== Music videos ==
Year	Song	Album
1995	"Loving You More"	Ima
1995	"Blue Skies"	Ima
1996	"Anomaly – Calling Your Name"	Non-album single
1997	"Flaming June"	ESCM
1997	"Remember"	ESCM
1997	"Love, Peace and Grease"	ESCM
2000	"Never Gonna Come Back Down"	Movement in Still Life
2000	"Mercury & Solace"	Movement in Still Life
2003	"Somnambulist (Simply Being Loved)"	Emotional Technology
2006	"All That Makes Us Human Continues"	This Binary Universe
2006	"Dynamic Symmetry"	This Binary Universe
2006	"The Internal Locus"	This Binary Universe
2006	"1.618"	This Binary Universe
2006	"See You on the Other Side"	This Binary Universe
2006	"The Antikythera Mechanism"	This Binary Universe
2006	"Good Morning Kaia"	This Binary Universe
2009	"The Rose of Jericho"	These Hopeful Machines
2010	"Every Other Way"	These Hopeful Machines
2010	"The Emergency"	These Hopeful Machines
2011	"Suddenly"	These Hopeful Machines
2011	"A Million Stars"	These Hopeful Machines
2012	"Always"	These Hopeful Machines
2012	"Le Nocturne de Lumière"	These Hopeful Machines
2012	"13 Angels on My Broken Windowsill"	If the Stars Are Eternal So Are You and I
2013	"Our Dark Garden"	If the Stars Are Eternal So Are You and I
2013	"Must Be the Love"	A Song Across Wires
2013	"Skylarking"	A Song Across Wires
2013	"Surrounded"	A Song Across Wires
2014	"Letting Go"	A Song Across Wires
2014	"Vervoeren"	A Song Across Wires
2014	"Paralyzed"	Non-album single
2015	"Lifeline"	A Song Across Wires
2016	"Tokyo"	_
2016	"The Code of Hammurabi"	_
2016	"Lustral"	_
2016	"Found in Translation"	_
2016	"Artifacture"	_
2016	"Indivisim"	_
2016	"Ω"	_
2016	"Chromatophore"	_
2016	"Five Hundred and Eighty Two"	_
2020	"1AM in Paris"	The Lost Art of Longing
2020	"The War"	The Lost Art of Longing
2020	"No Warning Lights"	The Lost Art of Longing
2020	"Walk Into the Water"	The Lost Art of Longing
2021	"Here"	Non-album single

=== This Binary Universe ===
BT made seven music videos for each of the tracks off of his fifth studio album, This Binary Universe. Most of each of the videos is computer-animated, and each video lasts as long as the studio versions of each song, making them very lengthy. They can all be found on the DVD inside the physical release of This Binary Universe, and all of the videos were put onto iTunes not long after the release of the album. The track listing is:

1. "All That Makes Us Human Continues" (8:16)
2. "Dynamic Symmetry" (11:24)
3. "The Internal Locus" (10:28)
4. "1.618" (11:34)
5. "See You on the Other Side" (14:24)
6. "The Antikythera Mechanism" (10:06)
7. "Good Morning Kaia" (8:12)

All songs released in 2006.

=== (Untitled) ===
BT made nine music videos for each of the tracks off of his tenth studio album. The videos consist of aerial shots from across the world. The track listing is:

1. "Tokyo" (6:15)
2. "The Code of Hammurabi" (3:38)
3. "Lustral" (3:52)
4. "Found in Translation" (3:50)
5. "Artifacture" (19:00)
6. "Indivisim" (12:11)
7. "Ω" (15:24)
8. "Chromatophore" (16:38)
9. "Five Hundred and Eighty Two" (13:57)

All songs released in 2016.
