= R&R (Rare & Remixed) =

Compilation album by BT
- Released: October 23, 2001
- Genres: Dance, electronica, trance
- Label: Nettwerk
- Producer: Brian Transeau

BT chronology
Extended Movement (2000)	R&R (Rare & Remixed) (2001)	Still Life in Motion (2001)

R&R (Rare & Remixed) is a compilation made by BT. It contains various remixes of BT's songs, BT's remixes of other artists' songs, and rare BT songs. It is a double album, and is also BT's first compilation album, released in 2001.

== Track listing ==
Disc one
No.	Title	Length
1.	"BT – Remember (ESCM 12" Mix)"	6:21
2.	"Paul van Dyk – Forbidden Fruit (BT & PvD's Food of Love Mix)"	8:48
3.	"Dharma (AKA BT and John Selway) – Transway"	5:18
4.	"BT – Shame (Way Out West Mix)"	6:23
5.	"Grace – Not Over Yet (BT's Spirit of Grace)"	8:00
6.	"Mike Oldfield – Let There Be Light (BT Mix)" (remix named "BT Mix" on CD)	6:44
7.	"Libra (AKA BT) presents Taylor – Anomaly (Calling Your Name)" (featuring Jan Johnston)	7:43
8.	"Seal – I'm Alive (BT & Sasha Mix)"	5:09
9.	"Sasha & BT – Heart of Imagination"	8:11
10.	"Prana (AKA BT) – The Dream"	7:00
11.	"Elastic Reality (AKA BT) – Cassa De X"	4:20
Total length:		73:57

Disc two
No.	Title	Length
1.	"BT – Sunblind" (featuring Jan Johnston)	9:59
2.	"BT – Smartbomb (Plump DJs Mix)"	4:51
3.	"BT – Fibonacci Sequence"	6:38
4.	"BT – Hip Hop Phenomenon" (featuring Tsunami One)	3:45
5.	"BT – Godspeed (Hybrid Mix)"	3:58
6.	"BT – Dreaming (Science Dept.'s Friends and Family Mix)"	7:29
7.	"BT – Blue Skies (Paul Van Dyk's Blauer Himmel Mix / Erinnern Indigo Mix)" (featuring Tori Amos)	7:37
8.	"BT – Never Gonna Come Back Down (Timo Maas Mix)"	5:45
9.	"Dina Carroll – Run to You (BT vs PvD Mix)"	5:06
10.	"Sarah McLachlan – I Love You (BT Mix)"	7:44
11.	"BT – Flaming June"	7:15
Total length:		70:07
