= The Lost Art of Longing =

Studio album by BT
- Released: August 14, 2020
- Recorded: 2016–2020
- Genre: Trance; progressive house; indie dance; electronic dance music; Europop
- Length: 93:14
- Label: Black Hole Recordings
- Producer: Brian Transeau

BT chronology
| Everything You're Searching for Is on the Other Side of Fear (2019) | The Lost Art of Longing (2020) | Metaversal (2021) |

Singles from The Lost Art of Longing
- 1. "1AM in Paris / The War" Released: June 19, 2020; 2. "No Warning Lights" Released: July 17, 2020; 3. "Walk into the Water" Released: December 4, 2020; 4. "Never Odd or Even" Released: February 5, 2021; 5. "The Light Is Always On" Released: April 16, 2021; 6. "Windows" Released: July 16, 2021; 7. "Wildfire" Released: August 21, 2021; 8. "Red Lights" Released: September 10, 2021

The Lost Art of Longing is the thirteenth studio album by electronica artist BT. Two singles for the album, "1AM in Paris / The War" and "No Warning Lights", were released on June 19 and July 17, respectively. The album was announced on July 17 before Transeau made an official announcement on his Instagram and Facebook pages.

== Background ==
The Lost Art of Longing is considered a resurgence of electronic dance music for BT, akin to some of Transeau's previous releases, such as Ima, ESCM, Movement in Still Life, Emotional Technology, These Hopeful Machines and A Song Across Wires.

Transeau said of the significance and symbolism of the album:

One of the things nearing extinction; is the art of longing. As in, wanting of something you cannot immediately have. If anything positive is to come from the situation the world collectively finds itself in, it is my great hope – speed, instant gratification, and over-stimulation are swapped out for longing, imagination, and relational connection. For a child or teenager to sit thoughtfully and ponder what is to come, to hope for or envision something amazing, to dream of a place or a future – is becoming obsolete. Longing has been replaced with instant gratification. My hope is that this record reacquaints my audience with the lost art of longing. That they will take pause, get quiet, daydream, and connect to their own place of longing. Because that, I believe, is where the magic is.

== Track listing ==
| No. | Title | Writer(s) | Producer(s) | Length |
|---|---|---|---|---|
| 1. | "Game Theory" | Brian Transeau | BT | 5:02 |
| 2. | "Wildfire" | Transeau; Brenna MacQuarrie | BT; Jay Murphy | 7:39 |
| 3. | "Walk Into the Water" (with Matt Fax and Nation of One) | Transeau; David Ciekanski; Kristi Krings | BT; Matt Fax | 10:11 |
| 4. | "1AM in Paris" (with Matt Fax) | Transeau; Ciekanski | BT; Fax | 6:54 |
| 5. | "The Light Is Always On" (with Au5 featuring Mangal Suvarnan) | Transeau; Austin Collins; Mangal Suvarnan | BT; Au5; Suvarnan | 6:13 |
| 6. | "The War" (with Iraina Mancini) | Transeau; Iraina Mancini | BT; Paul Harris; Simon Hulbert | 6:41 |
| 7. | "Weltanschauung" | Transeau | BT | 10:05 |
| 8. | "I Will Be Yours" | Transeau; Daniel Nitt; Jenson Vaughan | BT | 6:04 |
| 9. | "If I Can Love You Right" (with Wish I Was featuring Lola Rhodes) | Transeau; Lonna Marie Spitaleri; Tyson Illingworth; Lola Rhodes | BT; Wish I Was | 3:34 |
| 10. | "Never Odd or Even" | Transeau | BT | 8:10 |
| 11. | "Windows" (feat. April Bender) | Transeau; April Bender; Lena Leon | BT | 4:40 |
| 12. | "Red Lights" (with Christian Burns) | Transeau; Christian Burns | BT; Jonny Radford | 5:30 |
| 13. | "No Warning Lights" (with Emma Hewitt) | Transeau; Emma Hewitt; Anthony Hewitt | BT | 8:53 |
| 14. | "Save Me" (with Christian Burns) | Transeau; Burns; Radford | BT; Radford | 3:38 |
| Total length: | | | | 93:14 |

Bonus disc
| No. | Title | Length |
|---|---|---|
| 15. | "No Warning Lights (ALPHA 9 Remix)" | 5:00 |
| 16. | "No Warning Lights (Sean Tyas Remix)" | 8:27 |
| 17. | "No Warning Lights (Andy Duguid Remix)" | 6:02 |
| 18. | "1 AM in Paris (7")" | 3:21 |
| 19. | "The War (7")" | 4:04 |
| 20. | "No Warning Lights (7")" | 4:54 |
| 21. | "Never Odd or Even (7")" | 4:34 |
| Total length: | | 129:36 |
