= Blue Skies (BT song) =

Single by BT featuring Tori Amos

from the album Ima (US Version)
- Released: October 28, 1996 (UK); November 4, 1996 (US); December 2, 1996 (Australia)
- Recorded: 1995
- Studio: Blue House on a Hill Studios (Boyds, MD)
- Genre: Dance; electronica; electronic rock
- Songwriter: Brian Wayne Transeau

BT singles chronology
"Loving You More" (1995)	"Blue Skies" (1996)	"Flaming June" (1997)

"Blue Skies" is a song by American electronica artist BT with featured vocals by American singer-songwriter and pianist Tori Amos. Released as a single in the United Kingdom in October 1996, it hit number one on the United States Hot Dance Music/Club Play chart in January 1997. "Blue Skies" also appears on the Party of Five soundtrack. Many versions (remixes) of the song exist.

While originally announced for BT's follow-up album, ESCM, it was later appended to the double-disc reissue of his first album, Ima.

In the album notes for BT's 10 Years in the Life compilation, BT says that Tori Amos performed 15 minutes of improvisational singing over his track "Divinity", which later became the vocals for "Blue Skies". He says that Tori never sang the words "blue" or "skies" in the recording. He joined together syllables and breaths to make new words through editing.

The 'Delphinium Days' mix samples lines and sounds from Derek Jarman's experimental film Blue (1993). The title 'Delphinium days' is a reference to lines from that film.

== Track listing ==
U.K. CD single 1 – PERF130CD1

1. "Blue Skies" (Radio Edit) – 3:49
2. "Blue Skies" (Delphinium Days) – 11:46
3. "Blue Skies" (Paul Van Dyk's Erinnern Indigo Mix) – 8:11
4. "Blue Skies" (Paul Van Dyk's Blauer Himmel Mix) – 8:00
5. "Blue Skies" (Robbers of Antiquity Alien Disco Mix) – 8:02

U.K. CD single 2 – PERF130CD2

1. "Blue Skies" (Radio Edit) – 3:49
2. "Blue Skies" (Rabbit in the Moon's Phathomless Mix) – 10:14
3. "Blue Skies" (Deep Dish Blue Phunk Mix) – 8:55
4. "Blue Skies" (Deep Dish Blue Phunk Dub) – 4:55
5. "Blue Skies" (BT's Liquid Oxygen Dub) – 9:06

U.K. 12-inch single – PERF130T

1. "Blue Skies" (Paul Van Dyk's Blauer Himmel Mix) – 8:00
2. "Blue Skies" (Deep Dish Blue Phunk Mix) – 8:55
3. "Blue Skies" (Rabbit in the Moon's Phathomless Mix) – 10:14

== Charts ==
Chart (1996–1997)	Peak position
Australia (ARIA)	93
UK Singles Chart (OCC)	26
UK Dance Chart (OCC)	2
US Billboard Hot Dance Music/Club Play	1

== See also ==
- List of number-one dance singles of 1997 (U.S.)
