= Electronic Opus =

Remix album by BT
- Released: October 12, 2015
- Genres: Electronica, dance, alternative rock, trance, orchestra
- Label: Binary Acoustics
- Producers: Brian Transeau, Tommy Tallarico, Jon Leonardo, Sam Krichevsky, Aron Schoenfeld, Eímear Noone, Christopher Tin, Richard Devine, VolvoxLabs

BT chronology
A Song Across Wires (2013)	Electronic Opus (2015)	_ (2016)

Electronic Opus is a remix album by trance DJ BT, released on October 12, 2015.

== Background ==
On November 10, 2014, BT announced a Kickstarter project with Tommy Tallarico and TanZ Group to produce Electronic Opus, an electronic symphonic album with re-imagined, orchestral versions of BT's songs. As of December 7, 2014, the project has reached its crowd-funding goal of $250,000. A live orchestra played during Video Games Live at the Adrienne Arsht Center for the Performing Arts on March 29, 2015, while the album was released on October 12, 2015.

The album was released in Auro-3D (Audio Blu-ray) on September 30, 2016.

== Track listing ==
No.	Title	Length
1.	"Flaming June" (from ESCM)	4:18
2.	"Simply Being Loved" (from Emotional Technology)	4:13
3.	"Dreaming" (from Movement in Still Life)	5:36
4.	"The Ferris Wheel" (Theme to the Film Monster)	4:29
5.	"Love Comes Again" (from Just Be)	4:04
6.	"The Emergency" (from These Hopeful Machines)	3:21
7.	"Suddenly" (from These Hopeful Machines)	4:31
8.	"1.618" (from This Binary Universe)	5:24
9.	"A Million Stars" (from These Hopeful Machines)	5:50
10.	"Skylarking" (from A Song Across Wires)	5:43
11.	"These Silent Hearts" (from Mirage)	5:01
12.	"Good Morning Kaia" (from This Binary Universe)	7:19
13.	"Forget Me" (from These Hopeful Machines)	5:47
14.	"Satellite" (from Movement in Still Life)	7:45
Total length:		73:21
