= Everything You're Searching for Is on the Other Side of Fear =

Studio album by BT
- Released: December 13, 2019
- Genre: Ambient; electronica; orchestral; glitch
- Length: 78:38
- Label: Black Hole Recordings
- Producer: Brian Transeau

BT chronology
Between Here and You (2019)	Everything You're Searching for Is on the Other Side of Fear (2019)	The Lost Art of Longing (2020)

Everything You're Searching for Is on the Other Side of Fear is the twelfth studio album by American electronica musician BT. It was initially set to be a 17-track album with sounds akin to those from This Binary Universe and _. The album was released two months after Between Here and You on December 13, 2019.

== Track listing ==
No.	Title	Length
1.	"L'Esprit de l'Escalier"	4:09
2.	"Hygge"	8:43
3.	"Eating Up Sunday"	5:04
4.	"Snow Suspension"	3:51
5.	"The Boolean Query"	8:06
6.	"Orthogonal"	5:24
7.	"Paraglide"	1:03
8.	"Pale Antlers"	5:29
9.	"Thermocline"	2:47
10.	"Eidos"	4:28
11.	"HPT[k]"	4:14
12.	"Anchorage"	3:59
13.	"Carpe Noctem"	5:39
14.	"Piano in D"	6:37
15.	"The Day that Half Started"	6:26
16.	"White Shore Drive"	2:39
