= If the Stars Are Eternal So Are You and I =

Studio album by BT
- Released: June 19, 2012
- Genre: Ambient; electronica; glitch
- Length: 72:42
- Label: Laptop Symphony
- Producer: BT

BT chronology
Laptop Symphony (2012)	If the Stars Are Eternal So Are You and I (2012)	Morceau Subrosa (2012)

If the Stars Are Eternal So Are You and I is the seventh studio album by composer and electronica artist BT, and was released on June 19, 2012, in tandem with Morceau Subrosa, BT's eighth studio album.

== Development ==
First announced in March 2012, BT described If The Stars Are Eternal So Are You And I as a "follow-up" to his critically acclaimed and praised fifth studio album, This Binary Universe. While If The Stars Are Eternal So Are You And I was supposed to be released in mid-May 2012 after Morceau Subrosa (which was originally scheduled for release in April 2012), both albums missed their release windows. Then, after being announced for release on June 12, 2012, the albums missed the window again, finally being released one week later (June 19). It was formally re-released by Black Hole Recordings on January 15, 2013.

=== Musical style ===
If the Stars are Eternal So are You and I, like This Binary Universe before it, is an about-face from BT's previous album These Hopeful Machines, utilizing minimal beats, ambient soundscapes, and glitch music, using drum machines like the Roland TR-808, as opposed to the EDM style of These Hopeful Machines.

== Track listing ==
All tracks written and performed by BT.

No.	Title	Length
1.	"13 Angels on My Broken Windowsill"	14:08
2.	"Go(d)t"	9:57
3.	"Hymn[808]"	6:45
4.	"Seven-Hundred-Thirty-Nine"	10:52
5.	"Hikari"	4:46
6.	"Our Dark Garden"	13:02
7.	"The Gathering Darkness"	13:13
Total length:		72:42

※ The original track list switched around the names of track 4 & 5. This has since been corrected.
