= Still Life in Motion =

Remix album by BT
- Released: November 6, 2001
- Genre: Electronica, dance, alternative rock, hip hop, trance
- Label: Musicrama; Koch Entertainment

BT chronology
R&R (Rare & Remixed) (2001)	Still Life in Motion (2001)	10 Years in the Life (2002)

Still Life in Motion is a remix album by trance DJ BT, released in November 2001. It was released only in the United Kingdom. It contains various remixes from BT's third studio album, Movement in Still Life. It also contains four unmixed B-sides, released on the United States version of Movement in Still Life only.

== Track listing ==
No.	Title	Length
1.	"Shame"	3:20
2.	"Never Gonna Come Back Down"	5:46
3.	"Smartbomb"	5:10
4.	"Madskillz-Mic Chekka"	4:51
5.	"Love on Haight Street"	6:17
6.	"Shame (Way Out West Mix)"	8:04
7.	"Smartbomb (Plump DJs Mix)"	7:12
8.	"Never Gonna Come Back Down (Steve Lawler Mix)"	7:14
9.	"Shame (Bent Mix)"	7:14
Total length:		55:08
