= Daggers (All Hail the Silence album) =

Studio album by All Hail the Silence
- Released: January 18, 2019
- Genre: Electronic, synthpop, new wave
- Length: 86:52
- Label: KSS3TE Recordings
- Producer: Brian Transeau, Christian Burns

All Hail the Silence chronology
AHTS-001 (2016)	Daggers (2019)

BT chronology
_ (2016)	Daggers (2019)	Between Here and You (2019)

Singles from Daggers
- 1. "Diamonds in the Snow" Released: 28 September 2018

Daggers (stylized as the double dagger symbol ‡) is the debut studio album by collaborative project All Hail the Silence, consisting of musician BT and singer Christian Burns. The album was released on January 18, 2019.

BT and Christian are frequent collaborators, having worked together on songs from These Hopeful Machines, A Song Across Wires, and Simple Modern Answers. Daggers is the pair's first album release as a band, following the release the AHTS-001 extended play.

On September 28, 2018, the band released their first official single, "Diamonds in the Snow", along with its accompanying music video.

== Track listing ==
No.	Title	Length
1.	"Stand Together"	6:54
2.	"Temptation"	5:22
3.	"Talk"	6:25
4.	"The Alarm"	7:30
5.	"Diamonds in the Snow"	5:55
6.	"Looking Glass"	7:22
7.	"Massacre (feat. G-Eron)"	6:55
8.	"English Town"	5:31
9.	"Broken Satellite"	7:59
10.	"Black and White"	6:33
11.	"Video"	6:21
12.	"City Lovers"	5:39
13.	"Safety in Numbers"	4:55
14.	"Time"	3:34
