= Scott Pagano =

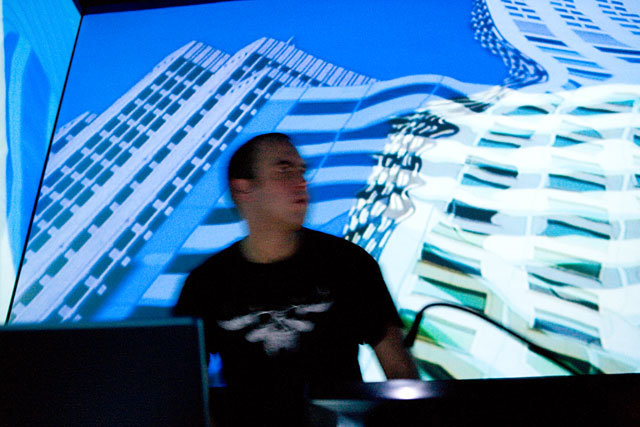
Live audiovisual set with Speedy J at Recombinant Media Labs

Scott Pagano is a Los Angeles–based video artist, filmmaker, and motion graphics designer, who constructs videos by re-mixing images of architecture, daily life, and intricate CG graphics. Pagano studied photography and graphic design at the Rhode Island School of Design and is a graduate of Brown University where he studied Modern Culture and Media.

Pagano has contributed video art to film festivals around the world starting in 2002, and his music videos have been shown on MTV. He has worked with musicians including BT, Funkstorung, Richard Devine, Christopher Willits, Monolake, Deadbeat, Speedy J, Chris Liebing, Kid606, Joan Jeanrenaud, and the Kronos Quartet.

Pagano is the co-curator of RELINE, a series of DVD releases featuring experimental video art. Reline1 was released in 2003 on Form001 and Reline2 was released on September 29, 2006, on Microcinema's Blackchair label.

== Discography ==
- Umfeld – UMTV001 – Music by Speedy J (2007)
- This Binary Universe – CDTS1140 – Music by BT (2006)
- Wrekage – Documentary on Keep Adding (2006)
- To Care – BIT013 – Music by Rolf&Fonky (2005)

=== Compilations ===
- Reline 2 – "From Brown To Green" – Music by Twerk (2006)
- Sonic Acts XI Anthology of Computer Art – "Chopping Heads" – Music by Funkstorung (2006)
- Chaise Two – "space.for.no.one" (2005)
- Isolated – !K7162 – "Chopping Heads" – Music by Funkstorung (2004)
- Reline – "ok.town re.work" (2003)

== Music video: director credits ==
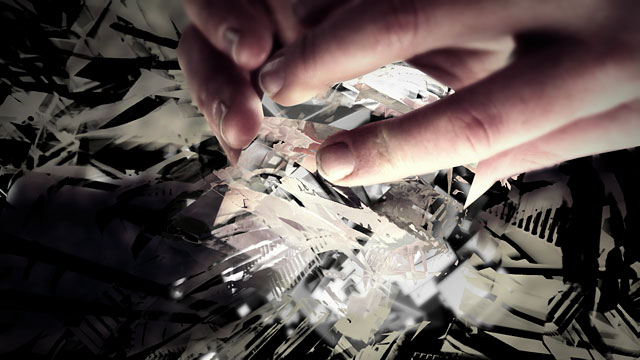
Still from "The Antikythera Mechanism"

- Parks on Fire – Trifonic (2008)
- Left – Michael Fakesch (2007)
- The Antikythera Mechanism – BT (2006)
- 1.618 – BT (2006)
- Colors Shifting – Christopher Willits (2006)
- cream3 – Speedy J & Chris Leibing (2005)
- Geometry – Rolf & Fonky (2004)
- Chopping Heads – Funkstörung (2004)
- From Brown to Green – Twerk (2003)
