= All Hail the Silence =

Electronic music duo

- All Hail the Silence in 2014. L-r; Christian Burns, BT

Background information
- Genres: Electronic, synthpop, minimal wave
- Years active: 2012, 2014–present
- Members: BT; Christian Burns
- Website: allhailthesilence.com

All Hail the Silence is an electronic music duo comprising American electronic musician BT and English singer-songwriter Christian Burns. The band was informally announced on March 8, 2012, but live shows and project announcements did not commence until the second half of 2014.

All Hail the Silence and its album are notable in that they were created using analog synthesizers without the aid of a computer.

== History ==
In 2012, Transeau contacted Burns, who collaborated with him on albums such as the These Hopeful Machines (2010) and A Song Across Wires (2013), asking about forming a band, which Burns accepted. Before the band's informal announcement, they recorded 17 songs in the basement of a synthesizer store called AnalogLand in Baltimore, without the use of a computer. Transeau said that the record was inspired by the teen angst of listening to synthpop bands from the 1980s and 1990s such as Depeche Mode, Yaz, The Human League, OMD and The Blue Nile. He described it as "synth wave".

One of the songs, "Looking Glass", was available for download as a "Tweet for a Track" song from Twitter and Facebook.

A first album was expected for release in the second half of 2012, but it was postponed so that both artists could finish their remaining solo projects.

In October 2013, it was announced that musician Vince Clarke would work with them on their album. On July 21, 2014, Transeau and Burns announced that their band would be touring with Erasure in fall 2014 for the album The Violet Flame.

On August 24, 2016, the duo announced that it would release a four-track limited edition colored 12" vinyl collectible extended play with Shopify on September 19, 2016, and the four songs were released on iTunes on December 16, 2016, with more songs to be released later.

On December 24, 2016, the duo released the song "All Hail the Silent Night" for free to celebrate Christmas.

On September 28, 2018, the duo released its first official single, "Diamonds in the Snow", with an accompanying music video. Billboard reported that the band's album, Daggers, would be released on January 18, 2019.

== Members ==
- BT (Brian Transeau) – synthesizers, drum machines
- Christian Burns – vocals

== Discography ==
=== Studio albums ===
Title	Album details
Daggers	Released: January 18, 2019; Label: KSS3TE Recordings; Format: Digital download, vinyl

=== Extended plays ===
Title	Album details
AHTS-001	Released: September 19, 2016; Label: Self-released, Black Hole Recordings; Format: Digital download, vinyl

=== Singles ===
Title	Year	Album
"Diamonds in the Snow"	2018	Daggers
"Christmas Upon Winter Hill" (featuring Tony Burns)	2018	none

=== Music videos ===
Title	Year	Director(s)	Album
"Time"	2016	none	Daggers
"Broken Satellite"	2017	none	Daggers
"Diamonds in the Snow"	2018	Histibe	Daggers
"Diamonds in the Snow (Jody Wisternoff Remix)"	2018	none	none
"Temptation"	2018	none	Daggers
"Christmas Upon Winter Hill"	2018	none	none
"The Alarm"	2019	none	Daggers
