= Loving You More =

Single by BT featuring Vincent Covello

from the album Ima
- Released: September 4, 1995
- Genre: Dance
- Length: 3:41 (radio edit)
- Label: Perfecto (UK); East West (EU)
- Songwriter(s): Brian Wayne Transeau; Vincent G Covello
- Producer(s): Brian Transeau

BT singles chronology
"Embracing the Sunshine" (1995)	"Loving You More" (1995)	"Blue Skies" (1996)

"Loving You More" is a song by American electronica artist BT, featuring vocals by Vincent Covello. It was released on September 4, 1995 through Perfecto and East West Records as the fourth single from his debut studio album, Ima. On release, the song reached number 14 on the UK Singles Chart, as well as number 2 and number 18 on the UK and the US Dance Chart respectively.

== Background ==
On the original release of Ima, the song was included in two remix forms as part of "Sasha's Voyage of Ima": "BT's Garden of Ima Dub" and "BT's Final Spiritual Journey". However, the radio edit was included on the vinyl release, and the two remixes were included on the 1996 2CD re-release of the album.

A music video was created for the radio edit of the song, and released alongside the single. It has since resurfaced on YouTube.

== Formats and track listings ==
CD single
No.	Title	Length
1.	"Loving You More" (7" Edit)	3:41
2.	"Loving You More" (BT's Primordial Sound 12" Vocal)	9:33
3.	"Loving You More" (Alcatraz Drop The Soap Mix)	9:52
4.	"Loving You More" (Man with No Name Remix)	6:59
5.	"Loving You More" (The Forth Remix)	9:43

Vinyl – UK
No.	Title	Length
1.	"Loving You More" (B.T.'s Primordial Sound 12" Vocal)	13:02
2.	"Loving You More" (Oakenfold & Osborne Vocal Mix)	8:12
3.	"Loving You More" (Feel the Sun Trance Mix)	8:11

Vinyl – EU
No.	Title	Length
1.	"Loving You More" (Garden of Ima Dub)	11:39
2.	"Loving You More" (Alcatraz Drop the Soap Mix)	9:30
3.	"Loving You More" (The Forth Remix)	9:30
4.	"Loving You More" (Man with No Name Remix)	6:58

== Charts ==
Chart (1995)	Peak position
UK Singles Chart (OCC)	14
UK Dance Chart (OCC)	2
US Dance Club Songs (Billboard)	18
