= Matt Fax =

- Born: David Ciekanski; 14 December 1996 (age 29)
- Genres: House, techno, progressive house, trance
- Occupations: Musician, producer, disc jockey
- Years active: 2012–present
- Labels: Anjunabeats, Armada Music, Black Hole Recordings, Enhanced Music, mau5trap, Zerothree
- Website: www.mattfaxmusic.com

David Ciekanski (born 14 December 1996), better known by his stage name Matt Fax, is a French electronic music DJ and record producer.

Having started his career in 2009, Fax encountered early success with support from renowned DJs and artists around the world, such as Depeche Mode, Armin van Buuren, Above & Beyond and Gareth Emery. Throughout his career, he has produced numerous tracks and remixes. His music is a blend of progressive house, trance music and techno.

== As David R. and Mike Duz (2009–2012) ==
David was introduced to music at an early age, mostly to rock music bands like Queen, Scorpions, AC/DC and French artists. His passion for electronic music came later by discovering Tiësto, which led to him wanting to be a DJ, and Joachim Garraud, which introduced him to music production. He also been introduced to hardcore music by his brother. He started producing and releasing his first tracks at the age of 13 under the alias David R., and had initial support from Laurent Garnier, playing his track "Technocolor" in a couple of his sets. He changed his name to Mike Duz a few years later, where he shifted from techno to electro house and progressive house. He had numerous releases on smaller independent record labels, until he was able to release a remix for Moguai on deadmau5's label mau5trap on 7 November 2011. He then changed his name to his current pseudonym, Matt Fax.

== As Matt Fax (2012–present) ==
=== The beginnings (2012–2013) ===
The first release under his Matt Fax alias was on 9 May 2012 on Balkan Connection. Throughout the year, he released most of his music on various small labels, until Jaytech and Above & Beyond, among others, started playing his music regularly. He signed with Silk Music later the year, where he released a couple of EPs and remixes through the multiples division for two years.

In early 2013, at the age of 16, he signed with Enhanced Music and released his first EP Late Night/Broadway under the Colorize sub-label, where Matt is still one of the most active artists today. Later in the year, he was asked to remix Jaytech on Anjunabeats, and was invited as a guest mixer on Group Therapy, Above & Beyond's radio show. The trio stated that Matt was "the youngest guestmixer to be invited on the show" and became "a regular fixture on Group Therapy". He also hosted a couple of episodes of Anjunabeats Worldwide, the trio's secondary show principally hosted by Anjunabeats artists. The same year, he remixed The Blizzard's classic "Piercing the Fog" on Armada Music, as well as Johan Vilborg & Adam Szabo's hit "Two to One" on Enhanced Music.

=== Hiatus (2014) ===
The next year, Matt released a couple of EPs on Colorize, as well as the single "Shift" on 4 August 2014, which remained one of his highest selling track for a few years. The track was revisited as a chill-out version in 2015.

In August, he announced he was considering quitting music. In a couple of interviews two years later, he admitted posting similar posts every year, as he had never been sure of his own choices.

On 29 December 2014, a retrospective compilation of Matt's works on Silk Music was released, marking his departure of the label. On a Q&A session on his Facebook page, someone asked if new material would be released on Silk Music, where Matt stated he had departed from the label and was not engaged in any projects for the moment.

=== Comeback and breakthrough (2015–2016) ===
"To be honest, I never stopped working when I said I quit. The problem is that a couple of months before the announcement, I started losing faith in what I did. Something wasn't right, my music was going nowhere, lost in the mass. So I eventually tried other styles to improve my production quality during then."

— Matt Fax, speaking about his hiatus with EDMprod.com

While a possible come-back was teased with his appearance DJ set at Above & Beyond's afterparty in Paris in January, he released the "Going Down/Hyperspace" EP on Colorize on 13 April 2015. Both tracks were supported by DJs around the world, including Armin van Buuren which played "Going Down" in Mumbai for the A State of Trance Festival warm-up. Throughout the year, he released the singles "Supertaper", "Tumble", "Moonlight", "Alpenglow" and "Aeris" (in collaboration with Jaytech), as well as the Belong/Mirth and CNFS/Stuck EPs, which were all supported on numerous radio shows and podcast from recognized DJs around the world, as well as being regularly played on radio stations such as SiriusXM.

On 5 February Matt released his new single "Warmrider", which he defined as "a tribute to the Progressive sound he used to love", as well as a contribution for ZeroThree's compilation #REALPROG V.2 called "Vina" and the Wrath EP on the same label.

On 11 March he released a new remix on Anjunabeats for Boom Jinx and Aruna's single "Light as a Feather", which was critically acclaimed. The release led to a second guest mix on Group Therapy, where he played a couple of his upcoming projects. He also played his first gig at Ministry of Sound in London on 18 March, playing at the same time as Andy Moor in another room.

His next EP, Careless/Huntdown, was released on 6 May on Colorize, and marked the 4th anniversary of Matt Fax. The track "Careless" has been played more than 500,000 times on Spotify, as well as being supported by DJs like Ferry Corsten, Cosmic Gate and Sam Feldt. A few weeks after the release, Matt unveiled a bonus track called "Backdraft" and was exclusively distributed on Bandcamp, on a pay-what-you-want payment basis.

Almost two months after the unveiling of the last EP, Armin van Buuren and Above & Beyond premiered the Horizon/Blimp EP in their respective radio shows. The EP was released on 8 July on Colorize, and showed a less deeper and more Balearic, soulful and almost clubbier sound than the "Careless / Huntdown" EP.

On 21 June, he was invited on Gareth Emery radio show Electric for Life and debuted his remix of his track "Hands", which was then released on 15 July. Gareth admitted being "such a big fan of this guy". He also remixed Tritonal single "Getaway" on Enhanced Music.

In the meantime, he released numerous singles, including "Progressia" on Gareth Emery's label Garuda, "Upward" on Avanti, a division of Black Hole Recordings, two EPs on Statement! and Colorize, as well as two remixes for Solarstone and Alex Klingle. All of these releases have generally been well received by the critics.

=== Debut album and further releases (2017–present) ===
2017 saw Matt releasing less music than the past years. He released the EP Circles/Aura Lusia on 3 February and it was heavily supported by Pete Tong on BBC Radio 1, and Avicii on his radio show LE7ELS. His following release, "Phantom", was supported by Armin van Buuren in his radio how A State of Trance. During the year, he played alongside Madeon, Aazar and Kristian Nairn at the Bypass club in Geneva.

During the summer, Matt teased about forthcoming releases. In late July, he announced "Amnesiac", the first single from his debut album Contrast. The single was released on 4 August. The following single "Close 2 U" was released on 1 September and was reviewed as 8.0/10 by DJ Mag. The full album was released on 6 October on Colorize and was streamed over 1 million time within a month on Spotify. Following the release, he was invited to Amsterdam to play a 20-minute guest mix and take part in an interview with Armin van Buuren on his radio show A State of Trance, making him the youngest guest on the show.

2018 saw him remixing high profile artists, such as Armin van Buuren, Andy Moor and tyDi. On 6 April, he played at the Ministry of Sound in London for the 10 Years of Enhanced Music. He also launched his Progressive House alias Matters, to focus on trance music under Matt Fax. His first EP Moves has been supported by Above & Beyond, Aly & Fila, Ruben de Ronde and Will Atkinson and accumulated over 300,000 streams on Spotify. The later Roof Park EP, has been reviewed as 8.0/10 by DJ Mag.

In October, Matt announced a collaboration with Grammy Award-nominated producer BT called "The Noetic". The single has been released on Armin van Buuren's label A State of Trance.

In 2019, he played at the A State of Trance 900 festival on 23 February and other shows around the world, including Japan. His single "To the Ground" was rated 9.0/10 by DJ Mag, and has been included in the rotation playlist on SiriusXM Diplo's Revolution and Radio FG. DJ supports for the track includes Tiesto, Lane 8, Diplo, Gareth Emery and Simon Patterson, among others. The track has also been used in various advertising commercials, such as Jaguar or John F. Kennedy Center for the Performing Arts.

On 24 April 2020, Matt released his second studio album, Progressions.

On 21 July 2023, Matt played his track "The Abyss" on A State Of Trance 1130

== Influences ==
Matt has been compared to Eric Prydz and deadmau5, who is one of his main inspirations. He also cites Jon Hopkins, Boards of Canada and Radiohead as inspirations.

== Discography ==
=== Albums ===
Title	Album details
Contrast	Release date: 14 October 2017; Label: Colorize (Enhanced Music); Format: Digital download
Progressions	Release date: 24 April 2020; Label: Colorize (Enhanced Music); Format: Digital download

=== Extended plays ===
Title	Year	Album
Invisible / Deadline	2012	Non-album singles
Every Beginning Has Its End	2012	Non-album singles
Sju / Léa	2012	Non-album singles
Voyager	2012	Non-album singles
Time / Watch	2012	Non-album singles
Magenta / Fly	2012	Non-album singles
Solaris / Center Kill	2012	Non-album singles
Late Night / Broadway	2013	Non-album singles
Anima / Beyond / Wickham	2013	Non-album singles
Point 9 / Evening Paris Highway	2013	Arrival pres. Matt Fax 01
Orion / Hidden Feelings	2013	Arrival pres. Matt Fax 01
Within / Cloudbreak	2014	Non-album single
Avalon / Over the Edge	2014	Arrival pres. Matt Fax 01
Going Down / Hyperspace	2015	Non-album singles
Belong / Mirth	2015	Non-album singles
CNFS / Stuck	2015	Non-album singles
Wrath	2016	Non-album singles
Careless / Huntdown	2016	Non-album singles
Horizon / Blimp	2016	Non-album singles
Swench / Last Touch / Halv	2016	Non-album singles
Circles / Aura Lusia	2017	Contrast
Moves / Epoch / Oblivion	2018	Non-album singles
Dark Woods / Echo / Ghost Stories	2018	Non-album singles
Roof Park	2018	Non-album singles
Collide / The Gate	2020	Non-album singles
1AM in Paris / The War (with BT)	2020	The Lost Art of Longing
Atlas / Lyra / Shuffle	2021	Non-album singles
Torn / Wonder	2021	Non-album singles
Run Away	2021	Non-album singles
Nova / Found (with Estiva)	2021	Non-album singles

=== Singles ===
Title	Year	Album
"Plane" (with Mindset)	2012	Non-album singles
"Morevenin"	2012	Non-album singles
"Barr"	2013	Non-album singles
"Departure" (with Blood Groove and Kikis)	2013	Wonderland
"Shift"	2014	Non-album single
"Dunton Green" (with Cramp)	2014	That's How We Roll
"Supertaper"	2015	Unified Vol. 2
"Moonlight"	2015	Non-album singles
"Aeris" (with Jaytech)	2015	Non-album singles
"Astral Ride"	2015	Non-album singles
"Warmrider"	2016	Non-album singles
"Vina"	2016	#Realprog Vol. 2
"Backdraft"	2016	Non-album singles
"Orbital"	2016	Non-album singles
"Progressia"	2016	Non-album singles
"Upward"	2016	Non-album singles
"Dogwander"	2016	Realprog Vol. 3
"Phantom"	2017	Non-album single
"Amnesiac"	2017	Contrast
"Close 2 U" (featuring Mike Schmid)	2017	Contrast
"Storm"	2018	Non-album singles
"Arylide"	2018	Non-album singles
"Epoch" (as Matt Fax presents Matters)	2018	Non-album singles
"Sweet Dream" (with Dezza)	2018	Non-album singles
"The Noetic" (with BT)	2018	Non-album singles
"Ignition"	2018	Non-album singles
"To the Ground"	2019	Non-album singles
"Universal"	2019	Non-album singles
"Eukarya" (with Rodg)	2019	Fate
"It's Always Now" (with TyDi)	2019	Non-album singles
"Kaleidoscope" (with Praana and Haliene)	2019	Non-album singles
"Abenaki"	2019	Non-album singles
"The Longest Road to the Ground" (with Morgan Page featuring Lissie)	2019	Non-album singles
"Nightride"	2019	Non-album singles
"Animal"	2020	Non-album singles
"Light On"	2020	Non-album singles
"Set Your Sails" (featuring Rbbts)	2020	Progressions
"1AM in Paris" (with BT and Iraina Mancini)	2020	The Lost Art of Longing
"Greatest Thing" (with Richard Bedford)	2020	Progressions
"Walk into the Water" (with BT and Nation of One)	2020	The Lost Art of Longing
"Here with Me" (with Richard Walters)	2021	Non-album single

=== Remixes ===
Year	Title	Artist	Label
2013	"For Life"	Inkfish	PHW
2013	"Lilt"	Weepee	Colorize (Enhanced)
2013	"Piercing the Fog"	The Blizzard	Armada Music
2013	"Labour of Love"	Jaytech (featuring Nathan Grainger)	Anjunabeats
2013	"Fly Me Home"	Ltn and Apsara	Silk Music
2013	"Two to One"	Adam Szabo and Johan Vilborg	Enhanced Music
2014	"It's a Funky Record"	Proff and Vadim Soloviev	Intricate Records
2014	"City Lights"	Justin Oh (featuring Jonny Rose)	Arrival (Silk Music)
2015	"This is Us"	Nigel Good	Silk Music
2016	"Aphonia"	Funkagenda	Ultraviolet
2016	"Golden"	Thomas Hayes (featuring Kyler England)	Enhanced Music
2016	"Light as a Feather"	Boom Jinx and Aruna	Anjunabeats
2016	"Getaway"	Tritonal (featuring Angel Taylor)	Enhanced Music
2016	"Hands"	Gareth Emery and Alastor (featuring London Thor)	Garuda
2016	"Release"	Solarstone	Armada Music
2016	"Kiss and Tell"	Joshi and Nina Carr	Colorize (Enhanced)
2016	"Colors Back"	Alex Klingle	Enhanced Music
2017	"Collateral Damage"	Levv	Enhanced Music
2018	"What If"	Armin van Buuren (featuring Vera Ostrova)	Armada Music
2018	"Decade"	The Blizzard	Future Sound of Egypt
2018	"My Name"	Maxim Schunk and Raven & Kreyn (featuring BISHØP)	Enhanced Music
2018	"There Is Light"	Andy Moor, Somna and Diana Leah	AVA Recordings
2018	"Did You Know"	TyDi and Christopher Tin (featuring London Thor)	Global Soundsystem
2018	"Call To Arms"	Gareth Emery (featuring Evan Henzi)	Garuda
2018	"The Last Goodbye"	Orjan Nilsen (featuring Matluck)	In My Opinion (Armada)
2019	"Little Planet"	Estiva	Armada Music
2019	"Games"	Ruben de Ronde and Louise Rademakers	Armada Music
2019	"Midnight Blue"	Ruben de Ronde and Rodg	Armada Music
2019	"All You Need to Know"	Gryffin and Slander (featuring Calle Lehmann)	Darkroom / Geffen Records
2019	"Worlds Collide"	Nervo	Thrive Music
2020	"1000 Faces"	Jason Ross and Dia Frampton	Ophelia
2020	"Shooting Arrows"	Lane 8 featuring Poliça	This Never Happened
2020	"Another Youth"	Steve Brian and Matt Fax	Enhanced Music
2021	"Before You Go"	Shingo Nakamura	Monstercat Silk
2022	"Synthetic Blues"	Kasablanca	Armada Music
