= (album) =

2016 studio album by BT

_

Studio album by BT
- Released: October 14, 2016
- Genres: Ambient; electronica; glitch
- Length: 46:56 (_); 92:28 (_+)
- Label: Black Hole
- Producer: Brian Transeau

BT chronology
Electronic Opus (2015)	_ (2016)	Daggers (2019)

_ (no official pronunciation) is the tenth studio album by American electronica musician BT. It was released online on October 14, 2016, and the 64GB USB flash release was shipped on December 2, 2016. This included more than two hours of music with 4K-resolution videos shot by drone for the album.

The album was intended to be untitled. However, due to the restrictions of digital download services, which forbade blank titles, BT chose to use an underscore as the album's name. He admitted that this title resulted in complaints from fans about difficulties in finding the album on popular services due to the inability of most search engines to handle the character.

== Background ==
On December 14, 2015, BT disclosed news to DJ Mag about a new album to come by early 2016. Similar to This Binary Universe, BT explains that "the entire record is recorded in a way [I have] never recorded anything before," and that the record has a "modular, ambient aesthetic". Track names that were mentioned in the article include "Chromatophore", "Ω", "Indivism" and "582" (the names of "Indivism" and "582" were changed to "Indivisim" and "Five Hundred and Eighty Two" in the final release). On August 1, 2016, BT spoke to Mix about the album, which was recently completed. The album is intended to be named by the listeners. Additional track names that were mentioned in the article include "Artifacture", "Five Hundred and Eighty Two", and "Found in Translation". On October 10, 2016, BT announced on Facebook that the parts of the album ("Artifacture", "Indivism", and "Ω") would be released in "movements" on October 14, 2016.

The album was recorded in Maine, Maryland, Iceland, China, Poland, Bora Bora, Tokyo, Australia, and many other places around the world.

== Track listing ==
Digital download – _+
No.	Title	Length
1.	"Tokyo"	6:02
2.	"The Code of Hammurabi"	3:37
3.	"Lustral"	3:52
4.	"Found in Translation"	3:52
5.	"Artifacture"	18:28
6.	"Indivisim"	12:12
7.	"Ω"	15:21
8.	"Chromatophore"	15:56
9.	"Five Hundred and Eighty Two"	13:08
Total length:		92:28

=== "Artifacture", "Indivisim" and "Ω" (_) ===
"Artifacture"
No.	Title	Length
1.	"I. Adagietto Granulare" (English: "Slow Rhymes")	2:57
2.	"II. Nostra Luna di Miele" (English: "Our Honeymoon")	2:55
3.	"III. Guidati dalla Luce" (English: "Guided by the Light")	0:48
4.	"IV. La Caduta con Moto" (English: "The Fall of Movement")	2:07
5.	"V. La Vita Sotto il Mare" (English: "Life Under the Sea")	1:52
6.	"VI. Niente di Tutto Qualcosa" (English: "Nothing of Everything Something")	1:12
7.	"VII. Rocambolesco in una Città di Notte" (English: "Fantastic in the City of Night")	1:03
8.	"VIII. Un Nuovo Contesto" (English: "A New Context")	1:36
9.	"IX. Mancando Nobilmente" (English: "Missed Nobility")	3:54
Total length:		18:28

"Indivisim"
No.	Title	Length
1.	"I. Trasformata di Fourier Veloce" (English: "Fast Fourier Transform")	1:09
2.	"II. Fette di Basso Ostinato" (English: "Slices of Bass Rhythm")	1:26
3.	"III. Decomposizione di Tempo" (English: "Decomposition of Time")	0:38
4.	"IV. Uno ad Uno i Controcanti Parlano" (English: "One by One the Counterpoint Speak")	1:11
5.	"V. Immobilità in Movimento" (English: "Immobility in Movement")	0:34
6.	"VI. Variante di Frammenti di Basso" (English: "Variant of Bass Fragments")	1:09
7.	"VII. Dalla Forma al Senza Forma" (English: "From Form to Formless")	6:02
Total length:		12:12

"Ω"
No.	Title	Length
1.	"I. La Nascita di Diventare" (English: "The Birth of Becoming")	0:59
2.	"II. Evoluzione di Nuove Forme" (English: "Evolution of New Forms")	1:26
3.	"III. Da metà tempo a Tempo Pieno" (English: "From Half Time to Full Time")	1:04
4.	"IV. Melodie che si Ergono Come Onde" (English: "Melodies That Come Like Waves")	0:59
5.	"V. Tema Soarning" (English: "Soaring Theme")	1:08
6.	"VI. Staccando gli Strati" (English: "Peeling Off the Layers")	0:15
7.	"VII. Filatura Funzioni di Trasferimento Relative a Testa" (English: "Spinning Head Related Transfer Functions")	0:32
8.	"VIII. il Movimento Invertito" (English: "Inverted Movement")	0:48
9.	"IX. Meriggiare una Matrice di Musica Modulare" (English: "To Rest at Noon a Modular Music Matrix")	8:07
Total length:		15:21

== Charts ==
Chart (2016)	Peak position
US Top Dance Albums (Billboard)	9

== Release history ==
Region	Date	Format	Label
Worldwide	October 14, 2016	Digital download – _	Black Hole Recordings
Worldwide	December 2, 2016	USB	Black Hole Recordings
Worldwide	January 18, 2017	Digital download – _+	Black Hole Recordings
