= Iraina Mancini =

British singer and songwriter

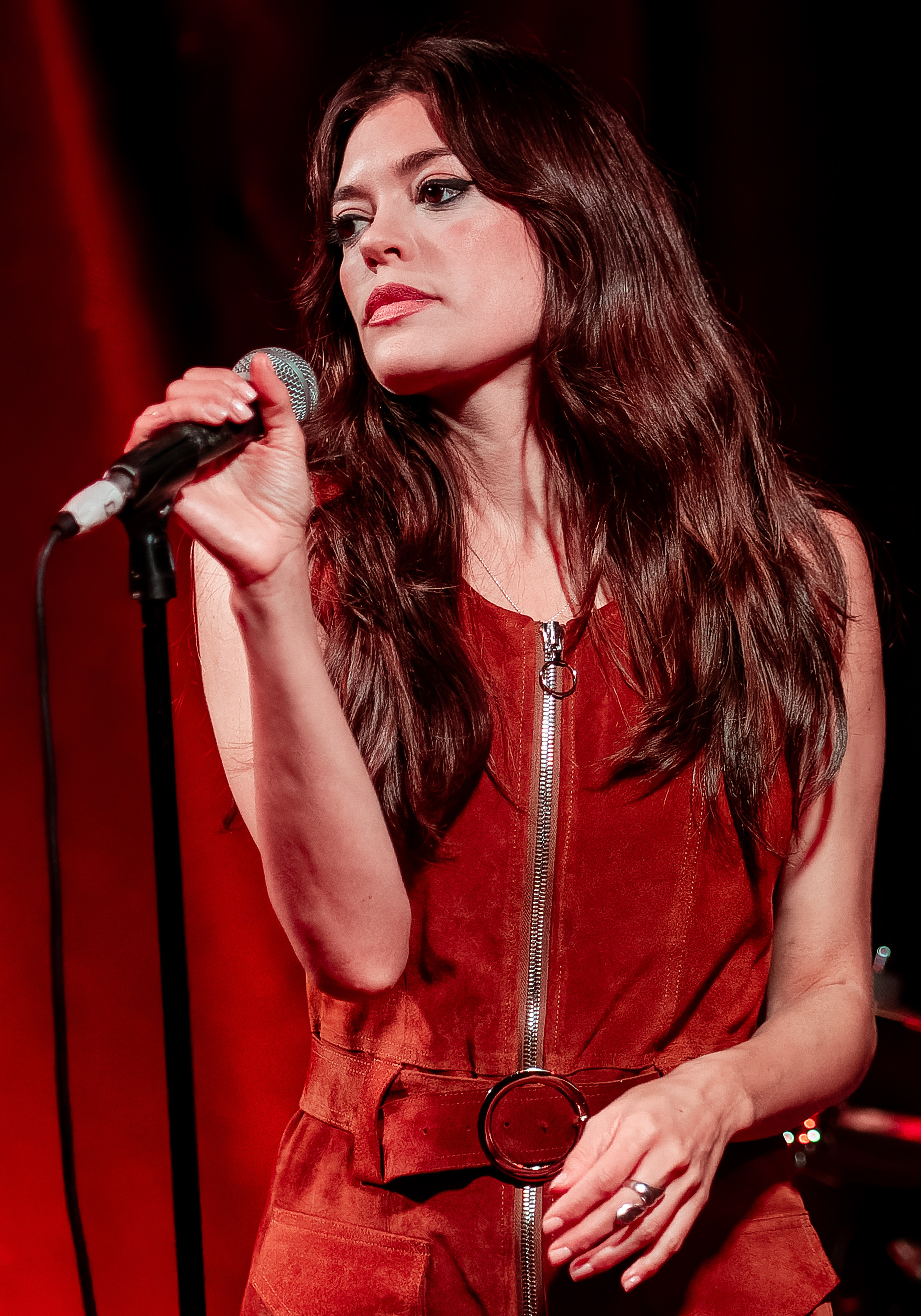

Background information
- Born: 30 January 1991 (age 35); London, England
- Occupations: Singer, DJ, Model
- Website: irainamancini.com

Iraina Mancini is a British singer, songwriter, DJ, radio host, and model.

== Biography ==
Mancini at The Lexington, London, in 2023

Iraina Mancini was born in London, England. Her father, Warren Peace, was a childhood friend of David Bowie, and contributed to several of Bowie's albums and tours.

Mancini's music career began with Mancini an electronic pop group that appeared on Channel 4's Mobile Act Unsigned. After Mancini disbanded, the singer moved to Liverpool and started a band called The Venus Fury with ex members of The Zutons and The Dead 60s.

As a DJ, Mancini typically plays Northern soul, early rhythm and blues, ska, funk, Garage Rock and Latin boogaloo. She has played throughout London and internationally at music and film festivals such as the Toronto Film Festival, Glastonbury, and The Secret Garden Party. Mancini has played for brands such as GQ, NME Awards, Swarovski, American Express, and Samsung. She ran a popular monthly night called "Soul Box" in East London with Eddie Piller and fashion photographer Dean Chalkley. Mancini also presents a monthly radio show on Soho Radio.

On 19 June 2020, Mancini provided vocals for "The War," a single from electronic musicians BT and Matt Fax, which appears in the album The Lost Art of Longing.

In 2021, Mancini returned with new solo music including singles "Shotgun", "Deep End", and "Do It (You stole the Rhythm)." Her music takes influences from 1960s French cinema, Psychedelia, Serge Gainsbourg, and French YeYe girls. All singles playlist and featured heavily on BBC 6 Music and Radio 2 with firm fans in Lauren Laverne, Jo Whiley and Chris Hawkins.

In 2022, she released "Undo the Blue", a single produced by Jagz Kooner.

On 18 August 2023, Mancini released her debut album, Undo the Blue, on Needle Mythology Records.

On 15 September, the band Saint Etienne (band) remixed Manicini's pop single "Sugar High".

In April 2024, her music influences were described as those stemming from yé-yé, vintage cinema".

== Reception ==
A review in The Times described Mancini as "infuriatingly cool," and her sound as "lushly retro, with the sixties looming largest."

Lauren Laverne declared: This is an artist I absolutely love.”

== Discography ==
- "Do It (You Stole The Rhythm)"
- Undo The Blue (2022)
- "Sugar High"
