= Morceau Subrosa =

Studio album by BT
- Released: June 19, 2012
- Genre: Ambient; electronica
- Length: 46:42
- Label: Laptop Symphony
- Producer: BT

BT chronology
If the Stars Are Eternal So Are You and I (2012)	Morceau Subrosa (2012)	A Song Across Wires (2013)

Morceau Subrosa (also known, in full, as SUPPLEMENTO {BT: Volume 01. SERAPHIM 09.} NUOVO MORCEAU SUBROSA {A topological ABSTRACT of Granular Systems} [Symphonie elektronik]) is the eighth studio album by composer and electronica artist BT, and was released on June 19, 2012, in tandem with If the Stars Are Eternal So Are You and I, his seventh studio album.

== Development ==
First announced in March 2012, BT described Morceau Subrosa as "unlike any other album I have released." While Morceau Subrosa which was originally scheduled for release in April 2012 before If the Stars Are Eternal So Are You and I (which was supposed to be released in mid-May 2012), both albums missed their release windows. Then, after being announced for release on June 12, 2012, the albums missed the window again, finally being released one week later (June 19).

=== Musical style ===
Morceau Subrosa is very different in style compared to most of BT's previous works, exclusively favoring ambient soundscapes. Certain aspects of the album were previously used in These Hopeful Machines, such as ambient intros.

== Track listing ==
Morceau Subrosa (46:42)
No.	Title	Length
1.	"Nicht Musik [Verklärung] No. 2 in D Major"	7:41
2.	"Sonitum Explicandis Tardius"	6:02
3.	"Tabular Sarsa(λ) Algorithm No. 13"	10:46
4.	"Seraphim"	3:58
5.	"Le Particules et les Sortilèges Muse No. 3"	6:32
6.	"The Art of Perceptual Aliasing"	3:00
7.	"Chant des Étoiles Thought No. 9, K 421"	7:10
8.	"Apotheosis"	1:31
