= Flaming June (song) =

Single by BT

from the album ESCM
- Released: June 30, 1997
- Studio: Blue House on a Hill Studios, Maryland, U.S.
- Genre: Trance
- Length: 9:14
- Label: Perfecto Records
- Songwriter(s): BT; Paul van Dyk
- Producer(s): BT; Paul van Dyk

BT singles chronology
"Blue Skies" (1996)	"Flaming June" (1997)	"Remember" (1997)

"Flaming June" is an instrumental by American electronica musician BT. Released on June 30, 1997 through Perfecto Records as the lead single from his second studio album ESCM, it features co-production from German DJ and producer Paul van Dyk, and was remixed by British musician Chicane.

Upon release, the single charted in the UK, peaking at number 19 on the UK Singles Chart. It has been considered an "anthem" of dance music. In 2015, a reimagining of the instrumental was featured on BT's remix album Electronic Opus.

In 2023, Paul Oakenfold released a remix of the song.

== Formats and track listings ==
12"
No.	Title	Length
1.	"Flaming June (BT & PvD Original Mix)"	9:14
2.	"Flaming June (Chicane Remix)"	9:20

UK CD single 1
No.	Title	Length
1.	"Flaming June (BT & PvD Edit)"	3:46
2.	"Orbitus Teranium (Album Version)"	8:28
3.	"Orbitus Teranium (Lenco Shift Mix)"	6:03

UK CD single 2
No.	Title	Length
1.	"Flaming June (BT & PvD Mix)"	8:50
2.	"Flaming June (Lemon D Remix)"	8:13
3.	"Flaming June (H.H.C. Remix)"	7:26
4.	"Flaming June (Simon Hale's Orchestra)"	5:12

UK, Australian and European CD single
No.	Title	Length
1.	"Flaming June (BT & PvD Edit)"	3:44
2.	"Flaming June (Chicane Remix)"	9:20
3.	"Flaming June (H.H.C. Remix)"	7:26
4.	"Flaming June (BT & PvD Mix)"	8:50

== Charts ==
Chart (1997)	Peak position
UK Singles (Official Charts Company)	19
UK Dance Singles (Official Charts Company)	1

Chart (1998)	Peak position
UK Singles (Official Charts Company)	28
UK Dance Singles (Official Charts Company)	1
