= Ima (BT album) =

Studio album by BT
- Released: October 9, 1995
- Genre: Trance
- Length: 76:20 (CD, digital); 138:39 (1996 US 2CD); 72:08 (LP)
- Label: Perfecto; Kinetic; Reprise; Warner Bros.
- Producer: Brian Transeau

BT chronology
Ima (1995)	ESCM (1997)

Singles from Ima
- 1. "Embracing the Future" Released: 1993; 2. "Embracing the Sunshine" Released: 1994; 3. "Nocturnal Transmission" Released: 1994; 4. "Quark" Released: 1995; 5. "Divinity" Released: 1995; 6. "Tripping the Light Fantastic" Released: 1995; 7. "Loving You More" Released: September 4, 1995; 8. "Blue Skies" Released: October 28, 1996

Alternative cover

Ima (/ˈiːmə/; stylized as 今 ima; Japanese for "now") is the debut studio album by American electronic musician BT, released on October 9, 1995, through Perfecto Records. The album is considered a major stepping stone in trance music, popularizing a more progressive approach. The album includes the 1995 single "Embracing the Future", which reached number one on the UK Dance Chart, as well as "Loving You More" featuring Vincent Covello. Following its release, Ima appeared on the UK Albums Chart for four weeks, peaking at 45. In 1996, the album was released in the United States in a double disc format, with the US Dance number one single "Blue Skies" featuring Tori Amos.

== Background ==
Brian Transeau (BT) released his debut single, "Embracing the Future" in 1993 through MusicNow Records in the United States, where it failed to chart. However, Welsh DJ Sasha performed the song in the United Kingdom where it saw success, and he paid for Transeau to relocate to the country. Transeau brought an IBM Personal System/2 computer from the US, which the album was recorded on.

== Composition ==
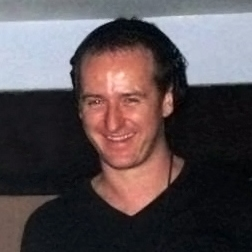
Welsh DJ Sasha (pictured) provides a DJ mix on the album

In an interview with Musik Magazine, Transeau spoke about the composition of the album. He cited that "Nocturnal Transmission" and "Quark" were inspired by nature, after he was taken hiking by British DJ Guy Oldhams in Cumbria, North England. On the topic of the album's composition, Transeau stated:

"When I came to the end of [composing "Nocturnal Transmission"], I suddenly got the idea for "Loving You More". All the chord sequences just pulled together. So, in a way, this track did the job of two"

The album's fourth track, "Sasha's Voyage of Ima", is a DJ mix by Sasha, comprising the three former tracks in addition to mixes of "Embracing the Future", "Loving You More" and "Deeper Sunshine". Explaining the inclusion of the mix on the album, Transeau stated that "I wanted some tracks to stand out for themselves, but I also wanted Sasha to show how he interprets songs. He makes every individual record more than just the sum of its parts".

"Loving You More" was composed as a challenge for Transeau to create a vocal track; of which the vocals were provided by Vincent Covello. The final track, "Divinity", was composed after Transeau recorded himself overtone singing.

== Release ==
Ima was released on October 9, 1995, through Perfecto Records in the United Kingdom. In the United States, it was released in 1996 in a double disc format, featuring the single "Blue Skies", featuring Tori Amos, as well as its remix, "Blue Skies (The Delphinium Days Mix)". "Blue Skies" was previously featured in edited form on the soundtrack for the TV show Party of Five. This version also includes several singles released prior to the album, as well as the B-sides to "Embracing the Sunshine" and "Nocturnal Transmission". A portion of "Nocturnal Transmission" is featured in the film The Fast and the Furious, for which BT also composed the score.

The cover art is a photograph of Christ of the Abyss, a submerged bronze statue of Jesus Christ in the Mediterranean Sea.

== Critical reception ==
Professional ratings
Review scores
Source	Rating
AllMusic	4/5 stars
Alternative Press	4/5 stars
Muzik	5/5 stars
Select	4/5 medals

Ima received positive reviews from critics.

== Track listing ==
Track and version titles and durations listed below refer to actual contents. The releases come with some erroneous and/or incomplete details. All songs written and produced by Brian Transeau, except "Loving You More" written by Brian Transeau and Vincent Covello.

CD and digital download
No.	Title	Length
1.	"Nocturnal Transmission"	9:06
2.	"Quark"	7:22
3.	"Tripping the Light Fantastic"	6:30
4.	"Sasha's Voyage of Ima (mixed by Sasha)": "Embracing the Future" (Embracing the Sunshine Mix); "Quark"; "Embracing The Sunshine (Deeper Sunshine Mix)"; "Loving You More" (BT's Garden of Ima Dub; featuring Vincent Covello); "Loving You More" (BT's Final Spiritual Journey; featuring Vincent Covello); "Nocturnal Transmission"; "Tripping the Light Fantastic"	42:25
5.	"Divinity"	10:57
Total length:		76:20

Double vinyl
No.	Title	Length
1.	"Divinity"	10:57
2.	"Loving You More" (Radio Edit)	4:29
3.	"Nocturnal Transmission"	9:36
4.	"Embracing the Future"	5:11
5.	"Quark"	8:07
6.	"Deeper Sunshine"	7:05
7.	"Tripping the Light Fantastic"	7:15
8.	"Poseidon"	9:28
Total length:		72:08

=== 1996 US release ===
Disc one
No.	Title	Length
1.	"Nocturnal Transmission"	8:37
2.	"Quark"	6:28
3.	"Tripping the Light Fantastic"	6:44
4.	"Embracing the Future" (Embracing the Sunshine Mix)	5:16
5.	"Embracing The Sunshine" (Deeper Sunshine Mix)	7:00
6.	"Loving You More" (BT's Garden of Ima Dub)	9:31
7.	"Loving You More" (Oakenfold & Osborne Radio Mix)	3:29
8.	"Poseidon"	8:58
9.	"Embracing the Sunshine" (Sasha's Remix)	10:57
Total length:		67:00

Disc two
No.	Title	Length
1.	"Blue Skies" (featuring Tori Amos)	5:04
2.	"Blue Skies" (The Delphinium Days Mix; featuring Tori Amos)	12:52
3.	"Sasha's Voyage of Ima"	42:45
4.	"Divinity"	10:58
Total length:		71:39

== Personnel ==
- Tori Amos – vocals on "Blue Skies"
- Arun Chakraverty – mastering on "Divinity"
- Alexander Coe (Sasha) – DJ mix ("Sasha's Voyage of Ima")
- Vincent Covello – vocals on "Loving You More"
- Richard Dekkard – programming and editing on "Sasha's Voyage of Ima" [uncredited]
- Victor Imbres – mix engineer on "Loving You More"
- Aiden Love – engineering on "Tripping the Light Fantastic"
- Roger Lyons – engineering on "Quark"
- Oakenfold & Osborne – remixing on "Loving You More (Oakenfold & Osborne Radio Mix)"
- Brian Transeau (BT) – all other vocals, instruments and programming, recording, mixing, songwriter, arranger, producer

== Charts ==
Chart (1995)	Peak position
UK Albums (Official Charts Company)	45
