= A Song Across Wires =

Studio album by BT
- Released: August 16, 2013
- Genre: Trance, progressive house, dubstep, electronic dance music
- Length: 79:30 (Continuous Mix); 43:30 (iTunes release); 98:32 (Extended Versions)
- Label: Armada Music
- Producer: BT

BT chronology
Morceau Subrosa (2012)	A Song Across Wires (2013)	Electronic Opus (2015)

Singles from A Song Across Wires
- 1. "Tomahawk" Released: October 31, 2011; 2. "Must Be the Love" Released: September 17, 2012; 3. "Vervoeren" Released: October 21, 2012; 4. "Skylarking" Released: February 18, 2013; 5. "Surrounded" Released: July 15, 2013; 6. "Letting Go" Released: February 24, 2014

Professional ratings
Review scores
Source	Rating
Mixmag	4/5 stars

A Song Across Wires (promoted by the hashtag #ASAW) is the ninth studio album by composer and electronica artist BT, released on August 16, 2013. This album features more vocal tracks and a plethora of guest artists as part of his alternate instrumental and vocal album productions. The album consists of 12 songs and was released in both digital and physical copies. On the album, BT collaborates with singers and producers of his previous album, These Hopeful Machines, such as Christian Burns and JES, as well as new ones, such as Arty, Nadia Ali, Aqualung, tyDi and more.

== Background ==
There have been four #1 Beatport trance singles from BT's ninth artist album on the Beatport genre charts. The first single from the album, "Tomahawk", was released on October 31, 2011. "Must Be the Love" is the second album single, produced alongside Arty and Nadia Ali, and released on September 17, 2012. The official music video for the song premiered on February 22, 2013. The third single released from the album is "Skylarking", an instrumental track that appeared in Armin van Buuren's A State of Trance 2013 and came out on February 18, 2013, with its official music video being released on June 10, 2013. "Surrounded", the fourth single from A Song Across Wires, was released on July 15, 2013.

The official track list of the album was released by BT himself on July 10, 2013. The album trailer was released on August 3, 2013. On CD, the album consisted of a 79-minute DJ set of all 12 songs. Digitally, the album was released either entirely in radio edits (such as on iTunes and through record label Armada's own website) or in extended form, alongside the DJ mix. Notably, Extended Versions features an extended mix of the previously released "Must Be the Love". The album itself contains "City Life", a song sung entirely in Korean, along with a new recording of BT's 1995 single "Anomaly - Calling Your Name", which was originally released under the name Libra presents Taylor and was featured in Mortal Kombat Annihilation and American Pie.

== Track listing ==
=== CD pressing ===
No.	Title	Length
1.	"Skylarking"	8:45
2.	"Letting Go" (with Fractal & JES)	5:41
3.	"Tomahawk" (with Adam K)	7:17
4.	"City Life" (with Fractal & Bada)	6:09
5.	"Stem the Tides" (with tyDi & Tania Zygar)	6:51
6.	"Tonight" (with tyDi & JES)	7:13
7.	"Love Divine" (with Stefan Dabruck & Christian Burns)	4:45
8.	"Surrounded" (with Aqualung)	4:58
9.	"Vervoeren"	6:05
10.	"Calling Your Name" (with Tritonal & Emma Hewitt)	6:07
11.	"Must Be the Love" (with Arty & Nadia Ali)	7:15
12.	"Lifeline" (feat. Dragon, Jontron & Senadee)	8:08
Total length:		79:14

iTunes/Armada Digital release
No.	Title	Length
1.	"Skylarking"	3:28
2.	"Letting Go" (with Fractal & JES)	3:28
3.	"Tomahawk" (with Adam K)	3:34
4.	"City Life" (with Fractal & Bada)	3:31
5.	"Stem the Tides" (with tyDi & Tania Zygar)	3:32
6.	"Tonight" (with tyDi & JES)	3:18
7.	"Love Divine" (with Stefan Dabruck & Christian Burns)	3:22
8.	"Surrounded" (with Au5 & Aqualung)	3:35
9.	"Vervoeren"	3:38
10.	"Calling Your Name" (with Tritonal & Emma Hewitt)	2:49
11.	"Must Be the Love" (with Arty & Nadia Ali)	4:39
12.	"Lifeline" (feat. Dragon, Jontron & Senadee)	4:36
Total length:		43:30

Continuous mix
No.	Title	Length
13.	"A Song Across Wires" (full continuous mix)	79:30
Total length:		123:00

Extended versions
No.	Title	Length
1.	"Skylarking"	10:44
2.	"Letting Go" (with Fractal & JES)	6:19
3.	"Tomahawk" (with Adam K)	9:07
4.	"City Life" (with Fractal & Bada)	9:08
5.	"Stem the Tides" (with tyDi & Tania Zygar)	9:42
6.	"Tonight" (with tyDi & JES)	9:44
7.	"Love Divine" (with Stefan Dabruck & Christian Burns)	6:39
8.	"Surrounded" (with Au5 & Aqualung)	5:49
9.	"Vervoeren"	6:08
10.	"Calling Your Name" (with Tritonal & Emma Hewitt)	6:31
11.	"Must Be the Love" (with Arty & Nadia Ali)	9:49
12.	"Lifeline" (feat. Dragon, Jontron & Senadee)	8:57
Total length:		98:37

Deluxe version
No.	Title	Length
13.	"Skylarking" (Maor Levi radio edit)	3:08
14.	"Must Be the Love" (Dannic radio edit with Arty & Nadia Ali)	3:31
15.	"Letting Go" (Antillas & Dankann radio edit with Fractal & JES)	3:42
16.	"Surrounded" (Super8 & Tab radio edit with Au5 & Aqualung)	3:23
17.	"Skylarking" (Ilan Bluestone radio edit with Au5 & Aqualung)	3:41
18.	"Must Be the Love" (Shogun radio edit with Arty & Nadia Ali)	4:10
19.	"Letting Go" (LTN radio edit with Fractal & JES)	4:38
20.	"Surrounded" (Tony Awake radio edit with Au5 & Aqualung)	3:20
21.	"Lifeline" (Ashley Wallbridge radio edit feat. Dragon, Jontron & Senadee)	3:13
Total length:		79:14

== Charts ==
Chart (2013)	Peak position
Dutch Albums (Album Top 100)	10
US Top Dance Albums (Billboard)	5
US Heatseekers Albums (Billboard)	7
