= BT (musician) =

American musician (born 1971)

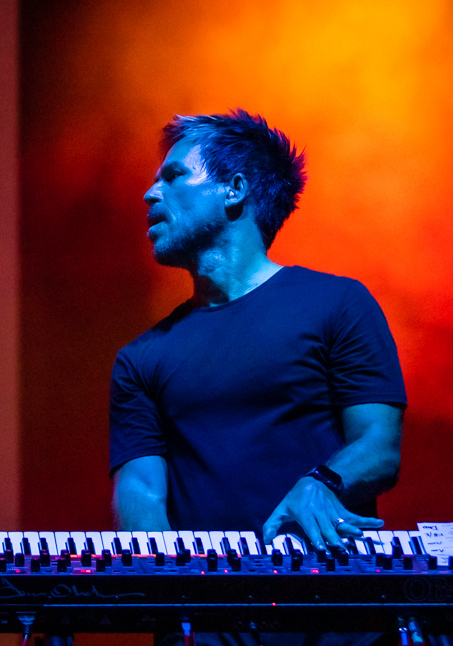
- BT performing in 2019

Background information
- Also known as: Prana; Elastic Chakra; Elastic Reality; Libra; Dharma; Kaistar; GTB
- Born: Brian Wayne Transeau; October 4, 1971 (age 55); Rockville, Maryland, U.S.
- Genres: Electronic; trance; trip hop; IDM; house; ambient; breakbeat; big beat; glitch; orchestral
- Occupations: DJ, singer-songwriter, musician, composer, record producer and audio engineer
- Years active: 1989–present
- Labels: Perfecto/Reprise; Vandit; Headspace; Nettwerk; DTS; 405; Black Hole; New State; Armada; Enhanced; Anjunabeats; Flashover; Coldharbour; Binary Acoustics; Monstercat

Brian Wayne Transeau (born October 4, 1971), known by his initials as BT, is an American musician, DJ, singer, songwriter, record producer, composer, and audio engineer. An artist in the electronic music genre, he is credited as a pioneer of the trance and intelligent dance music styles that paved the way for EDM, and for "stretching electronic music to its technical breaking point." In 2010, he was nominated for a Grammy Award for Best Electronic/Dance Album for These Hopeful Machines. He creates music within myriad styles, such as classical, film composition, and bass music.

BT holds multiple patents for pioneering the technique he calls stutter editing. This production technique consists of taking a small fragment of sound and repeating it rhythmically, often at audio rate values while processing the resultant stream using advanced digital processing techniques. BT was entered into the Guinness Book of World Records for his song "Somnambulist (Simply Being Loved)", recognized as using the largest number of vocal edits in a song (6,178 edits). BT's work with stutter edit techniques led to the formation of software development company Sonik Architects, developer of the sound-processing software plug-ins Stutter Edit and BreakTweaker, and Phobos with Spitfire Audio.

BT has produced, collaborated, and written with a variety of artists, including Death Cab for Cutie, Howard Jones, Peter Gabriel, David Bowie, Madonna, Rob Dickinson, Markus Schulz, Armin van Buuren, Sting, Depeche Mode, Tori Amos, NSYNC, Blake Lewis, The Roots, Guru, Britney Spears, Paul van Dyk, and Tiësto. He has composed original scores for films such as Go, The Fast and the Furious, and Monster, and his scores and compositions have appeared on television series such as Smallville, Six Feet Under, and Philip K. Dick's Electric Dreams. He was commissioned to compose a four-hour, 256 channel installation composition for the Tomorrowland-themed area at Shanghai Disneyland, which opened in 2016.

== Early life and education ==
BT was born in Rockville, Maryland on October 4, 1971. His father was an FBI and DEA agent, and his mother a psychiatrist. BT started listening to classical music at the age of 4 and started playing classical piano at an early age, utilizing the Suzuki method. By the age of eight he was studying composition and theory at the Washington Conservatory of Music. He was introduced to electronic music through the breakdancing culture and the Vangelis score for the film Blade Runner, which led him to discover influential electronic music artists such as Afrika Bambaataa, Kraftwerk, New Order and Depeche Mode. Transeau also cites hearing the Blue Nile for the first time, and seeing OMD in concert, as significant moments in his youth. In high school, he played drums in one band, bass in a ska band and guitar in a punk group. At 15, he was accepted to the Berklee College of Music in Boston, Massachusetts, where he studied jazz and enjoyed experimenting, such as running keyboards through old guitar pedals.

== Career ==
BT is a multi-instrumentalist, playing piano, guitar, bass, keyboards, synths, sequencers, the glockenspiel, drum machines and instruments he has modified himself. His process for creating songs typically starts with composition on basic instruments, like the piano or an acoustic guitar.

=== 1989–1994: Early career ===
In 1989, after dropping out of Berklee, BT moved to Los Angeles, where he tried, unsuccessfully, to get signed as a singer-songwriter. Realizing he should focus on the electronic music he was more passionate about, he moved back to Maryland in 1990 and began collaborating with friends Ali "Dubfire" Shirazinia and Sharam Tayebi of Deep Dish. Together they started Deep Dish Records. Early in his career, BT worked under a variety of musical aliases, including Prana, Elastic Chakra, Elastic Reality, Libra, Dharma, Kaistar and GTB.

=== 1995–1996: Ima ===
In the early years of BT's career, he became a pioneering artist in the trance genre, this despite the fact that he does not consider himself a DJ, since he infrequently spins records and comes from an eclectic music background. When he started out, such common elements as a build, breakdown and drop were unclassified. BT's was a unique interpretation of what electronic music could be. His first recordings, "A Moment of Truth" and "Relativity", became hits in dance clubs in the UK. His productions were not yet popular in the US, and he was initially unaware that he had become popular across the Atlantic, where UK DJs like Sasha were regularly spinning his music for crowds. Sasha bought BT a ticket to London, where BT witnessed his own success in the clubs, with several thousand clubbers responding dramatically when Sasha played BT's song. He also met Paul Oakenfold, playing him tracks that would make up his first album. He was quickly signed to Oakenfold's record label, a subsidiary of Warner Brothers.

BT's 1995 debut album Ima, released on Oakenfold's label, was a progressive house effort. The opening track, "Nocturnal Transmission", was featured in The Fast and the Furious. The album also featured a song called "Loving You More" with Vincent Covello. Blending house beats with sweeping New Age sounds, Ima helped to create the trance sound. "Ima (今)" is the Japanese word for "now". BT has stated that it also means many other things and that the intention of the album is to have a different effect for everyone.

Following the release of Ima, BT began traveling to England regularly. It was during this time that he met Tori Amos. They would collaborate on his song "Blue Skies", which reached the number one spot on Billboard magazine's Dance Club Songs chart in January 1997. This track helped expand BT's notability beyond Europe, into North America. He soon began to remix songs for well-known artists such as Sting, Madonna, Seal, Sarah McLachlan, NSYNC, Britney Spears, Diana Ross and Mike Oldfield.

=== 1997–1998: ESCM ===
BT's second album, ESCM (standing for Electric Sky Church Music), released in 1997, features more complex melodies and traditional harmonies along with a heavier use of vocals. The tone of the album is darker and less whimsical than Ima. The album, as a whole, is much more diverse than BT's debut, expanding into drum and bass, breakbeat, hip-hop, rock and vocally-based tracks.

The biggest hit from ESCM was "Flaming June," a modern trance collaboration with German DJ Paul van Dyk. Van Dyk and BT would go on to collaborate on a number of works, including "Namistai" (found on the later album Movement in Still Life), as well as van Dyk's remix of BT's "Blue Skies" and "Remember". "Remember" featured Jan Johnston on vocals, and reached number one on the Billboard Dance Club Songs chart. BT and Van Dyk also remixed the van Dyk classic "Forbidden Fruit" as well as Dina Carroll's "Run to You", and BT collaborated with Simon Hale on "Firewater" and "Remember."

=== 1999–2002: Movement in Still Life ===
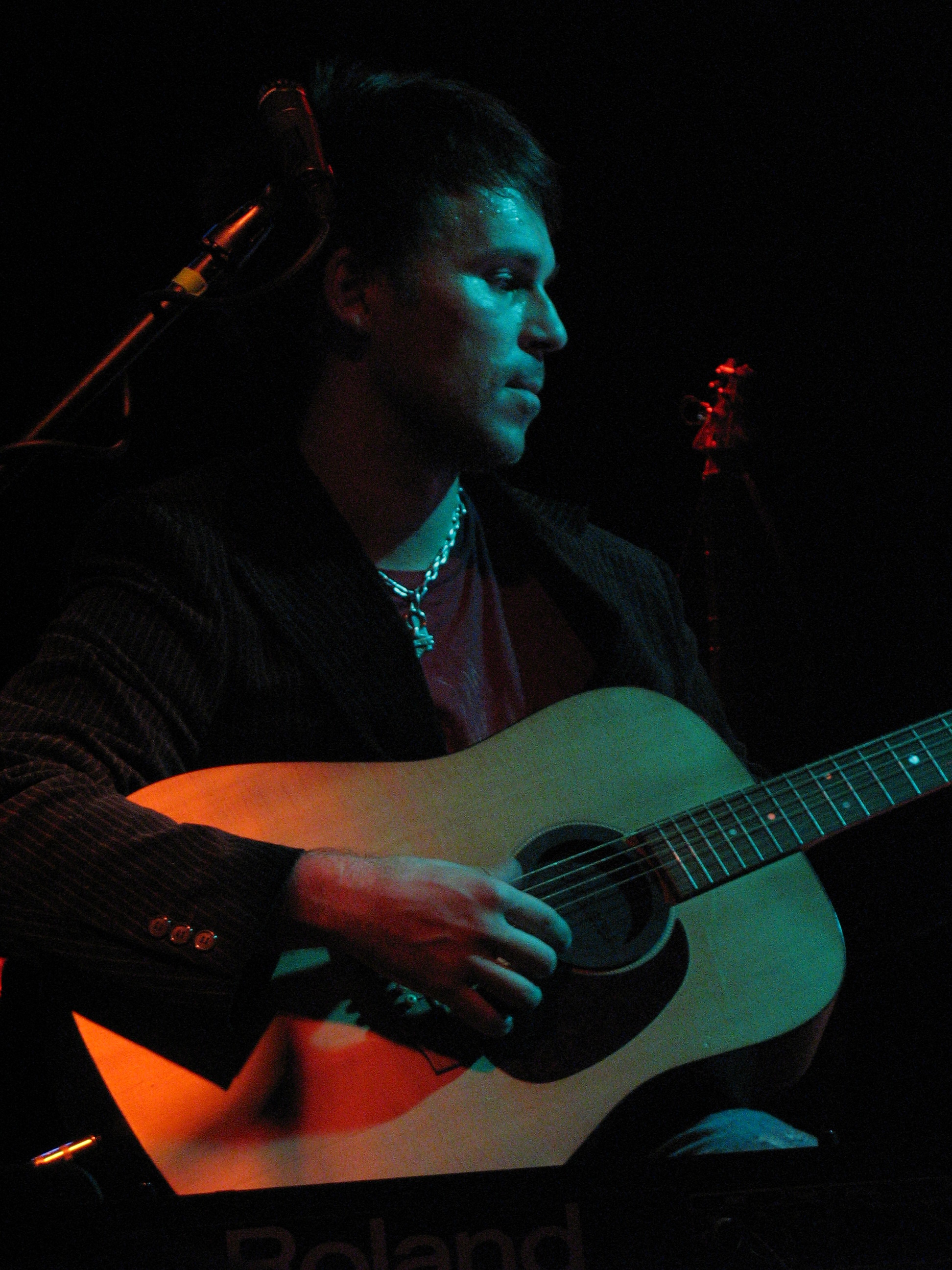
BT playing an acoustic version of "Satellite" from his 1999 album, Movement in Still Life, in 2006

In 1999, BT released his third album, Movement in Still Life, and continued his previous experimentation outside of the trance genre. The album features a strong element of nu skool breaks, a genre he helped define with "Hip-Hop Phenomenon" in collaboration with Tsunami One aka Adam Freeland and Kevin Beber. Along with trance collaborations with Paul van Dyk and DJ Rap, Movement includes pop ("Never Gonna Come Back Down" with M. Doughty on vocals), progressive house ("Dreaming" with Kirsty Hawkshaw on vocals) and hip hop-influenced tracks ("Madskill – Mic Chekka", which samples Grandmaster Flash and the Furious Five's "The Message", and "Smartbomb", a mix of funky, heavy riffs from both synthesizers and guitars woven over a hip-hop break). "Shame" and "Satellite" lean toward an alt-rock sound, while "Godspeed" and "Dreaming" fall into classic trance ranks. "Running Down the Way Up", a collaboration with fellow electronic act Hybrid, features sultry vocals and acoustic guitars heavily edited into a progressive breakbeat track.

"Dreaming" and "Godspeed" reached number 5 and number 10 on the Billboard Dance Club Songs chart, respectively, "Never Gonna Come Back Down" reached number 9 on the Billboard Dance Club Songs chart and number 16 on Billboard's Alternative Songs chart, and the album reached number 166 on the Billboard 200 album charts.

Long interested in branching out into film scoring, BT got the opportunity when director Doug Liman asked him to score Go, a 1999 film about dance music culture. Shortly after creating the score, BT moved to Los Angeles in order to further pursue film scoring. He also began writing music for string quartets to prove his capabilities beyond electronic music. He was then hired to score the film Under Suspicion with a 60-piece string section. For The Fast and the Furious, BT's score featured a 70-piece ensemble, along with polyrhythmic tribal sounds produced by orchestral percussionists banging on car chassis.

In 1999, BT collaborated with Peter Gabriel on the album OVO, the soundtrack to the Millennium Dome Show in London. In 2001, he produced NSYNC's hit single "Pop", which won a 2001 Teen Choice Award for Choice Single, won four MTV Video Music Awards, and reached number 19 on the Billboard Hot 100 and number 9 on the UK Singles chart. In 2002, BT released the compilation album 10 Years in the Life, a two-disc collection of rarities and remixes, including "The Moment of Truth", the first track he ever recorded.

=== 2003–2005: Emotional Technology ===
BT's fourth studio album, released on August 5, 2003, featured more vocal tracks than his previous fare, including six with vocals by BT himself. Emotional Technology was his most experimental album to date, exploring a range of genres; many consider it the "poppiest" of all his work. Emotional Technology spent 25 weeks on the Billboard Dance/Electronic Albums chart, reaching the top spot, and it reached number 138 on the Billboard 200 charts. The biggest single from the album, "Somnambulist (Simply Being Loved)", draws heavily from the breakbeats and new wave dance of New Order and Depeche Mode, whom BT has cited as major influences. "Somnambulist" holds the Guinness World Record for the largest number of vocal edits in a single track, with 6,178. It reached number 5 on the Billboard Dance Club Songs chart and number 98 on the Billboard Hot 100.

BT ventured into television production for Tommy Lee Goes to College for NBC in 2005. It starred Mötley Crüe drummer Tommy Lee. He executive-produced the reality television series, the idea for which he developed and sold to NBC.

BT worked with Sting on his album Sacred Love, co-producing the track "Never Coming Home".

=== 2006–2009: This Binary Universe ===
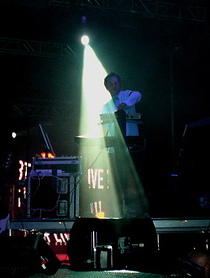
BT performing "Flaming June" at Ultra Music Festival in 2008

BT's fifth studio album, This Binary Universe, released on August 29, 2006, is his second album released in 5.1 surround sound, the first being the soundtrack to the 2003 film Monster.

The double album highlights a mix of genres, including jazz, breakbeats and classical. Three songs feature a full 110-piece orchestra. Unlike his previous two albums, which featured vocals on almost every track, this album is entirely instrumental. The tracks change genres constantly. For example, "The Antikythera Mechanism" starts off almost lullaby-like, complete with a piano, acoustic guitars and reversed beats; halfway through the track, it explodes with a 110-piece orchestra, followed by a section of breakbeats and ending with the de-construction of the orchestra. Animated videos created by visual effects artist Scott Pagano to accompany each song were included in a DVD packaged along with the CD. This Binary Universe reached number 4 on the Billboard Dance/Electronic Albums chart. BT's company, Sonik Architects, built the drum machine (the first in surround sound) used on the album.

Keyboard magazine said of the album, "In a hundred years, it could well be studied as the first major electronic work of the new millennium." Wired called it an "innovative masterpiece."

In November and December 2006, BT toured the album with Thomas Dolby opening. The concert featured a live slideshow of images from DeviantArt as a backdrop. All the shows were done in 5.1 surround sound, with BT playing piano, bass and other instruments live, and also singing on a cover of "Mad World" by Tears for Fears. Earlier in 2006, BT performed with an orchestra and conductor and visuals for an audience of 11,000 at the Video Games Live concert at the Hollywood Bowl in Los Angeles.

=== 2010–2011: These Hopeful Machines ===
BT performing at GearFest in 2011

BT's sixth studio album, These Hopeful Machines, was released on February 2, 2010. The double album features dance-pop, trance, house, breaks, soundscapes, orchestral interludes, acoustic guitar and stutter edits. With BT spending several years perfecting the album, mathematically placing edits and loops to create "an album of ultimate depth and movement," each of the songs went through a lengthy recording process. BT has estimated that each song on the album took over 100 sessions to record, adding that "Every Other Way" took 2 months to write and record, working 14 to 20 hours a day, 7 days a week. These Hopeful Machines was nominated for a 2011 Grammy Award for Best Electronic/Dance Album.

The album features guest appearances from and collaborations with Stewart Copeland of The Police, Kirsty Hawkshaw ("A Million Stars"), JES ("Every Other Way" and "The Light in Things"), Rob Dickinson ("Always" and "The Unbreakable"), Christian Burns ("Suddenly", "Emergency" and "Forget Me") and Andrew Bayer ("The Emergency"). It contains the most singles released from any BT album, with 8 of the 12 tracks released as singles. Official remixes were made by Armin van Buuren and Chicane. It reached number 6 on the Billboard Dance/Electronic Albums chart and number 154 on the Billboard 200 album charts. The singles "Emergency" and "Rose of Jericho" reached numbers 3 and 5 on the Billboard Dance Club Songs chart, respectively.

A remix album, titled These Re-Imagined Machines was released in 2011. These Humble Machines, an un-mixed album featuring shorter "radio edit" versions of the tracks (similar to the American version of Movement in Still Life) was also released in 2011.

=== 2012: If the Stars Are Eternal So Are You and I and Morceau Subrosa ===
On June 19, 2012, BT released If the Stars Are Eternal So Are You and I, along with Morceau Subrosa, his seventh and eighth studio albums. If the Stars Are Eternal So Are You and I was an about-face from BT's previous album These Hopeful Machines, utilizing minimal beats, ambient soundscapes, and glitch music, as opposed to the electronic music style of These Hopeful Machines. Morceau Subrosa is very different in style compared to most of BT's previous works, favoring ambient soundscapes and minimal beats.

=== 2013–2014: A Song Across Wires and radio shows ===
BT's ninth studio album, A Song Across Wires, was released worldwide on August 16, 2013. Blending elements of trance, progressive house and electro, the club music-oriented album reached number 5 on the Billboard Dance/Electronic Albums chart, and features four Beatport No. 1 trance singles: "Tomahawk" (with Adam K), "Must Be the Love" (with Arty and Nadia Ali), "Skylarking" and "Surrounded" (with Au5 and Aqualung). On the album, BT also collaborates with Senadee, Andrew Bayer, Tania Zygar, Emma Hewitt, JES, Fractal, tyDi and K-pop singer Bada.

In 2012, he released the mix collection Laptop Symphony, based on his laptop performances on his SiriusXM radio show, which range from dubstep to drumstep to progressive to trance. In 2013, he started a new Sirius XM radio program, Skylarking, on the Electric Area channel.

=== 2015–2019: Electronic Opus, All Hail the Silence, _ and ‡ ===
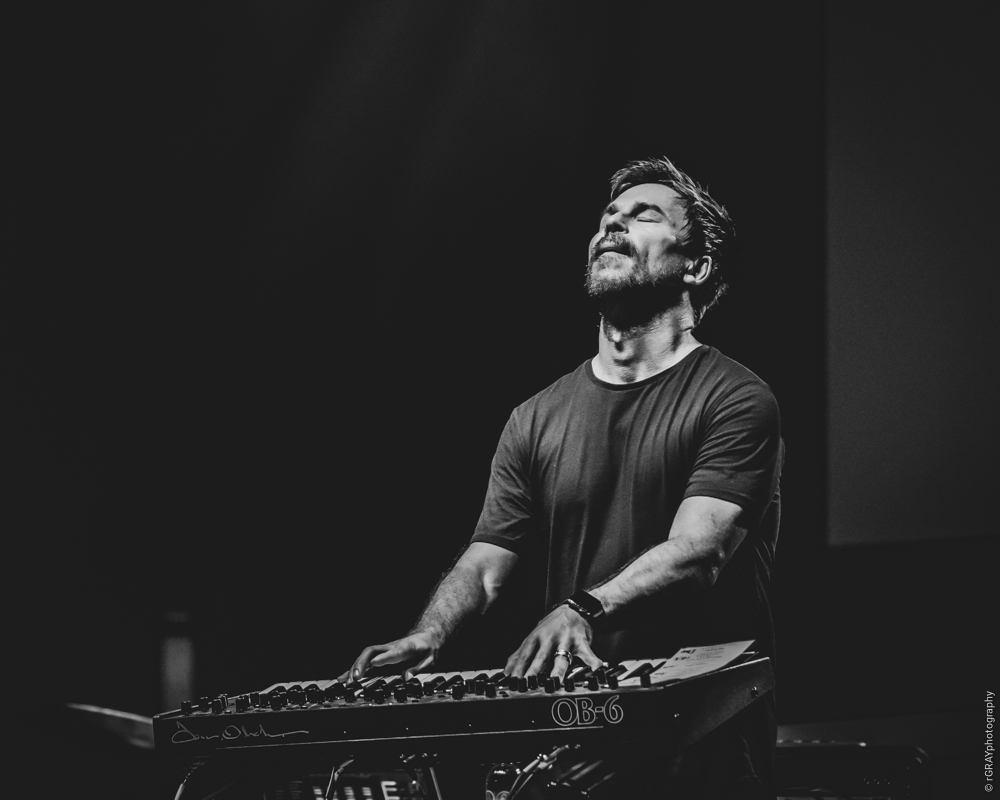
BT performing live at The Paramount in Huntington, New York, in 2019

On November 10, 2014, BT announced a Kickstarter project with Tommy Tallarico to produce Electronic Opus, an electronic symphonic album with re-imagined, orchestral versions of BT's songs. The project reached its crowd-funding goal of $200,000. A live orchestra played during Video Games Live on March 29, 2015, while the album was released on October 12, 2015.

On March 7, 2012, it was announced that BT and Christian Burns had formed a band called All Hail the Silence, with encouragement from Vince Clarke. They released their first unofficial single, "Looking Glass", online in 2012. On July 21, 2014, Transeau and Burns announced that their band would be touring with Erasure in the fall of 2014 for the album The Violet Flame. On August 24, 2016, the band announced that they would release a limited edition colored 12" vinyl collectible extended play entitled AHTS-001 with Shopify on September 19, 2016. On September 28, 2018, the band released their first official single, "Diamonds in the Snow", along with its accompanying music video. They released the music video for "Temptation" in December 2018. The band's first album, Daggers (stylized as ‡), was released on January 18, 2019.

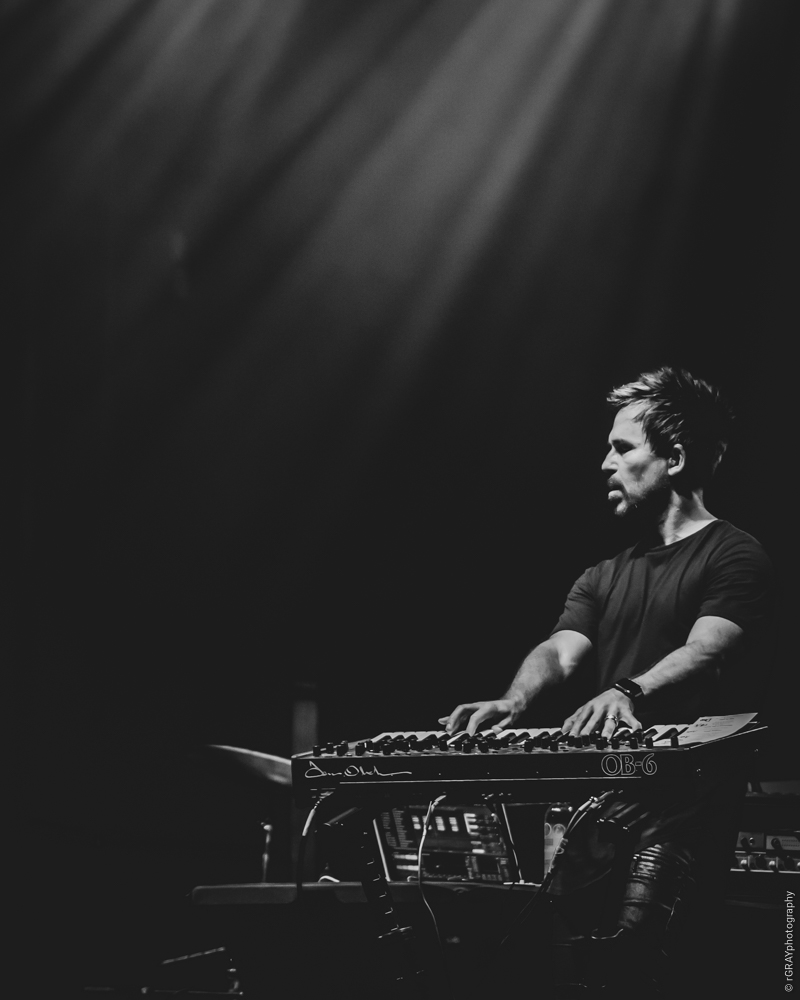
BT performing live at The Paramount in Huntington, New York, in 2019

On December 14, 2015, BT disclosed news to DJ Mag about a new album to come by early 2016. Similar to This Binary Universe, BT explained that "the entire record is recorded in a way [I've] never recorded anything before," and that it has a "modular, ambient aesthetic". The album, _, was released digitally on October 14, 2016, and physically on December 2, 2016, via Black Hole Recordings, along with an accompanying film. Due to the restrictions of most music sites, which forbid blank album titles, BT chose to name the album the underscore character "_". BT has admitted that this title has resulted in complaints from fans about difficulties in finding the album on popular services due to the inability of most search engines to handle the "_" character. On January 17, 2017, BT released _+, an extended version of _.

On October 10, 2019, BT announced on Instagram that two new albums were slated for release in the Fall of 2019: Between Here and You, an ambient album consisting of ten tracks, and Everything You're Searching for Is on the Other Side of Fear, a 17-track album with sounds akin to those from This Binary Universe and _. Between Here and You was released on October 18, 2019 and reached the number 1 spot on the Electronic Albums Chart on iTunes. Everything You're Searching for Is on the Other Side of Fear was released on December 13, 2019.

=== 2020–present: The Lost Art of Longing, Genesis.json, Metaversal and The Secret Language of Trees ===
On June 19, 2020, BT released the single "1AM in Paris / The War", which featured singer Iraina Mancini and DJ Matt Fax. On July 17, 2020, another single, "No Warning Lights" was released, featuring Emma Hewitt on vocals. It was later announced that The Lost Art of Longing would be his thirteenth album, released on August 14, 2020.

In May 2021, Transeau entered into the world of NFTs by composing music for a digital artwork piece entitled "DUNESCAPE XXI", and soon afterwards auctioning off a digital artwork piece entitled "Genesis.json", which includes 24 hours worth of original music that contains a raga and 15,000 hand-sequenced audio and visual moments. The artwork is programmed to give a special message on the owner's birthday and is the "only work of art that puts itself to sleep" on a certain time. In September 2021, BT announced his 14th album Metaversal, which was created and programmed entirely on a blockchain for release on September 29. The album was released publicly on November 19.

On June 6, 2023, Transeau released a single, "k-means clustering", and announced his 15th album, The Secret Language of Trees, which was released on July 11 on Monstercat.

In March 2025, Transeau and frequent collaborator Christian Burns formed a sub-label for Black Hole Recordings, KSS3TE Recordings.

In March 2025, BT was awarded the Legend of Dance – Level Award from Nexus Radio during an interview with the internet station in Miami. He also co-hosted the 41st TEC Awards in January 2026.

== Film, TV and video game scores ==
BT began scoring films in 1999 with Go. Since then he has scored over a dozen films, including The Fast and the Furious, Monster, Gone in 60 Seconds, Lara Croft: Tomb Raider and Catch and Release. His soundtrack for Stealth featured the song "She Can Do That", with lead vocals from David Bowie. BT produced the score for the 2001 film Zoolander, but had his name removed from the project. His tracks for the film were finished by composer David Arnold. BT also composed music for the Pixar animated short film Partysaurus Rex, released in 2012 alongside the 3D release of Finding Nemo.

He has scored or had his music licensed to the following video games: Die Hard Trilogy 2: Viva Las Vegas (2000), Wreckless: The Yakuza Missions (2002), FIFA Football 2002 (2002), Need for Speed: Underground (2003), Tiger Woods PGA Tour 2005 (2004), Burnout Revenge (2005), Need for Speed: Most Wanted (2005), EA Sports Active 2 (2010), TopSpin 2K25 (2024) and Mafia: The Old Country (2025). He made the official second-long alert tone for the Circa News app. In 2013, he scored Betrayal, a 13-episode drama on ABC.

In 2014, BT was selected by Walt Disney Company executives to score the music for the Tomorrowland-themed area at Shanghai Disneyland, which opened in 2016. He spent more than two years on the project, writing more than four hours of music that are played out of more than 200 speakers spread throughout Tomorrowland. BT called the undertaking "one of the most thrilling experiences of my life."

== Software ==
=== Sonik Architects ===
During the production of This Binary Universe, Transeau wanted to program drums in surround sound, and found that software tools to accomplish this weren't readily available. He decided to develop his own, forming his own software company, Sonik Architects, to create a line of sound design tools for the studio and another line of tools and plug-ins designed for live performance. The company's first release was the drum machine surround sound sequencer BreakTweaker, a PC plug-in. In 2009, Sonik Architects released Sonifi, a product for the iPhone, iPad and iPod Touch that enables musicians to replicate BT's stutter edit effect live. BT himself has used it during live shows.

In December 2010, Sonik Architects was acquired by software and music production company iZotope, and at the Winter NAMM Show in January 2011, the Stutter Edit plug-in, based on BT's patented technique of real-time manipulation of digital audio, was released by iZotope and BT.

In 2020, Transeau released an upgraded version of his Stutter Edit plug-in with iZotope, called Stutter Edit 2. This version includes more sound effects, more presets, and new features such as Auto Mode and the Curve editor.

=== SoundLabs ===
In 2024, Transeau co-founded SoundLabs, which allows for music corporations to use their artificial intelligence-assistive tools to create music and vocals for artists while letting artists retain the rights of such generated material. The company has entered an agreement with Universal Music Group to create vocals using SoundLabs' plugin MicDrop. A Spanish version of country music star Brenda Lee's 1958 song "Rockin' Around the Christmas Tree" using MicDrop was generated by SoundLabs.

=== Other software ===
Transeau is a user of the digital audio workstation FL Studio and he was included in the Power Users section on Image-Line's site in 2013. In 2014, BT collaborated with Boulanger Labs in creating the Leap Motion app Muse, a device that allows users to compose their own ambient sounds using gestural control. He also developed a standalone plugin synthesizer called BT Phobos for the music software company Spitfire Audio, which was released on April 6, 2017. BT created presets for the synth plugin Parallels, released by Softube in 2019. He also created analog synth tone patches for the synthesized Omnisphere 2, created by ILIO.

In 2022, BT released the reverb Tails with Unfiltered Audio and the synth plugin Polaris with Spitfire. In 2024, he released the drum layering plugin Snapback with Cableguys. In 2026, BT released the hybrid synthesizer Phoenix with Spitfire.

== Personal life ==
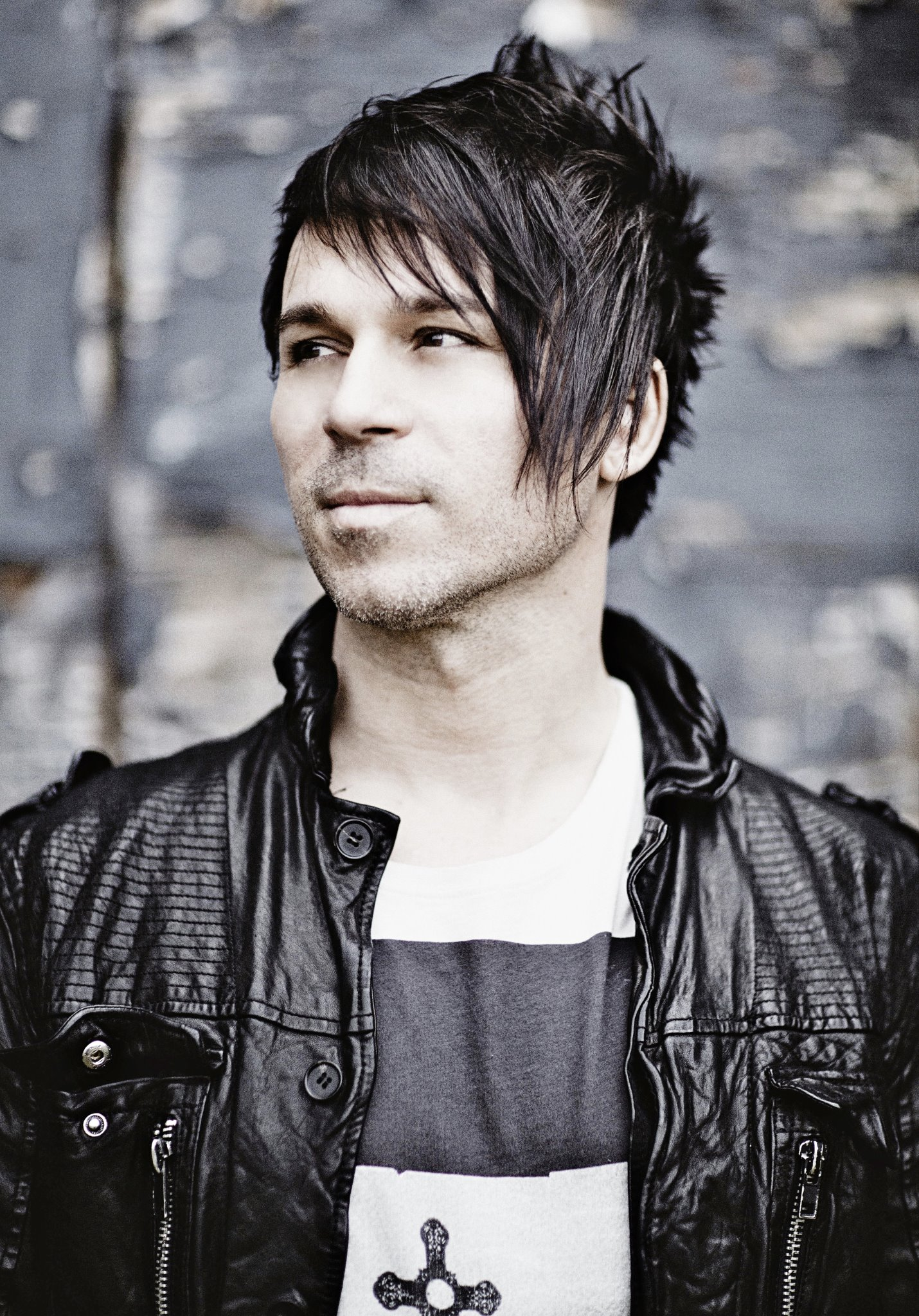
BT in 2009

He is an avid scuba diver, and supports the preservation of sharks. In February 2014, BT partnered with EDM lifestyle brand Electric Family to produce a collaboration bracelet for which 100% of the proceeds are donated to the Shark Trust. On October 19, 2014, BT was married to Lacy Transeau (née Bean). He has a daughter from a previous relationship.

== Awards and nominations ==
=== Grammy Awards ===
Year	Nominated work	Category	Result
2011	These Hopeful Machines	Grammy Award for Best Electronic/Dance Album	Nominated

=== International Dance Music Awards ===
Year	Nominee / work	Award	Result
2012	"Must Be the Love"	IDMA Award for Best Trance Track	Nominated
2013	"Skylarking"	IDMA Award for Best Trance Track	Nominated
2013	BT	IDMA Award for Best North American DJ	Nominated

=== Beatport Music Awards ===
Year	Nominee / work	Award	Result
2014	A Song Across Wires	Beatport Award for Album of the Year	Nominated

=== Computer Music Awards ===
Year	Nominee / work	Award	Result
2014	BT	Computer Music magazine Innovative Award	Won
2014	BT	Computer Music magazine Performance Award	Won

=== BMI Film & TV Awards ===
Year	Nominated work	Category	Result
2002	The Fast and the Furious	BMI Film Music Award	Won

=== Hollywood Music in Media Awards ===
Year	Award	Category	Result
2025	Mafia: The Old Country	Score - Video Game (Console & PC)	Nominated

=== Level Awards ===
Year	Nominee / work	Award	Result
2025	BT	Legend of Dance Award	Won

== Discography ==
Studio albums

- Ima (1995)
- ESCM (1997)
- Movement in Still Life (1999)
- Emotional Technology (2003)
- This Binary Universe (2006)
- These Hopeful Machines (2010)
- If the Stars Are Eternal So Are You and I (2012)
- Morceau Subrosa (2012)
- A Song Across Wires (2013)
- _ (2016)
- Between Here and You (2019)
- Everything You're Searching for Is on the Other Side of Fear (2019)
- The Lost Art of Longing (2020)
- Metaversal (2021)
- The Secret Language of Trees (2023)

With All Hail the Silence

- Daggers (2019)

== See also ==
- List of Number 1 Dance Hits (United States)
- List of artists who reached number one on the U.S. Dance chart
- Granular synthesis
- Stutter edit
