= ESCM (album) =

Studio album by BT
- Released: September 22, 1997
- Studio: Blue House on a Hill (Maryland); Omega (Rockville, Maryland); Abbey Road (London, UK)
- Genre: Electronica; trance; progressive trance; drum and bass; breakbeat
- Length: 76:04 (UK CD); 71:23 (US CD); 83:40 (LP)
- Label: Perfecto; Kinetic; Reprise; Warner Bros.
- Producer: BT

BT chronology
Ima (1995)	ESCM (1997)	Movement in Still Life (1999)

Singles from ESCM
- 1. "Flaming June" Released: June 30, 1997; 2. "Remember" Released: September 1, 1997; 3. "Love, Peace and Grease" Released: October 17, 1997

Professional ratings
Review scores
Source	Rating
AllMusic	4.5/5 stars
Spin	7/10

ESCM (initialism for Electric Sky Church Music) is the second studio album by American electronic musician BT, released on September 22, 1997.

== Background and recording ==
Following Ima, Transeau branched out to create club anthems such as "Flaming June", while also drawing inspiration from drum and bass as well as hip hop. ESCM also features Transeau adding live guitar, bass and drums to songs, as well as the use of a strings ensemble.

The majority of the album was produced and mixed by Transeau at Blue House on a Hill Studios, with the exception of string recordings that were done at Abbey Road Studios in London. "Solar Plexus" was recorded partially at Omega Studios in Rockville, Maryland.

Amongst the tracks recorded during the sessions but left unreleased were the track "Lemon Balm and Chamomile", written with Che Malcolm, and "Flesh", written with Jan Johnston. The latter track would later be remixed for a single release by Johnston in 2001.

== Release ==
The album was released on 22 September 1997 and supported by three singles; "Flaming June", "Remember", and "Love, Peace and Grease", all of which charted in the UK.

Like Ima, ESCM was also mixed to sound like one continuous mix. For US pressings, the loungy drum and bass track "The Road to Lostwithiel" was replaced with the more straightforward "Lullaby for Gaia". Both songs were later made available, in unmixed form, on the retrospect album, 10 Years in the Life. The US pressing also features an edited version of "Love, Peace, and Grease".

The cover of the album and its singles feature an "obelisk" similar to a Monolith from Stanley Kubrick's 2001: A Space Odyssey. The album cover was designed by British design firm Blue Source and was photographed in Iceland.

== Track listing ==
All tracks by Brian Transeau except where noted.

UK
No.	Title	Length
1.	"Firewater" (with T.H. Culhane)	8:42
2.	"Orbitus Teranium"	8:10
3.	"Flaming June"	8:31
4.	"The Road to Lostwithiel"	8:38
5.	"Memories in a Sea of Forgetfulness" (with T.H. Culhane)	7:40
6.	"Solar Plexus"	4:14
7.	"Nectar"	5:55
8.	"Remember" (with Jan Johnston)	8:01
9.	"Love, Peace and Grease"	5:21
10.	"Content" (contains an excerpt from "Flaming June (Simon Hale's Orchestra)" as a hidden track)	10:51
Total length:		76:04

US
No.	Title	Length
1.	"Firewater" (with T.H. Culhane)	8:42
2.	"Orbitus Teranium"	8:10
3.	"Flaming June"	8:31
4.	"Lullaby for Gaia" (with Jan Johnston)	5:26
5.	"Memories in a Sea of Forgetfulness" (with T.H. Culhane)	7:40
6.	"Solar Plexus"	4:14
7.	"Nectar"	5:55
8.	"Remember" (with Jan Johnston)	8:01
9.	"Love, Peace and Grease (BT Puma Fila Edit)"	3:52
10.	"Content" (contains an excerpt from "Flaming June (Simon Hale's Orchestra)" as a hidden track)	10:51
Total length:		71:23

== Personnel ==
- Simon Hale – strings arrangement on "Firewater", "The Road to Lostwithiel" and "Remember"
- Thomas Henry Culhane, Ph.D. – vocals on first half of "Firewater" and on "Memories in a Sea of Forgetfulness"
- Paul van Dyk – additional production on "Flaming June"
- Jan Johnston – vocals on "Lullaby for Gaia" and "Remember"
- Vini Reilly – flamenco guitar on "Remember"
- BT – all other vocals, instruments and programming

== Charts ==
Chart	Peak position
UK Albums Chart (OCC)	35
