= This Binary Universe =

- The original CD release has a physical overlay of the white cover and album title, with "BT" in morse code cut out of it (pictured). Most digital download covers (below) use the original background image in the CD jewel case.

Studio album by BT
- Released: August 29, 2006
- Genres: Ambient; electronica; orchestral; glitch
- Length: 74:19
- Labels: Binary Acoustics; DTS Entertainment
- Producer: BT

BT chronology
Emotional Technology (2003)	This Binary Universe (2006)	These Hopeful Machines (2010)

Alternate cover
- Digital download cover

This Binary Universe is the fifth studio album by American electronica artist BT, released on August 29, 2006. The album was a significant change in direction for Transeau, largely abandoning the progressive trance music he was known for, in favor of ambient soundscapes, live orchestration and glitch music. It is the first BT album not to be released on vinyl, nor feature any singles. The album was composed specifically for DTS 5.1 surround sound. A film version of the album received a limited theatrical run, usually accompanied by appearances from Transeau himself. The album is dedicated to Transeau's daughter, Kaia. The album's artwork makes nods to binary by spelling BT's name in morse code on the cover, as well as using additional morse code on the DVD menus.

== Overview ==
Prior to This Binary Universe, BT was at the forefront of the trance scene, creating and producing a wealth of popular singles for himself and others, including "Pop" for the pop group *NSYNC. BT's previous and most successful album, Emotional Technology, was the beginning of a more introspective and mature sound, which carried over to the soundtracks Transeau was producing at the time, including those for the films Stealth and Monster. These film scores featured minimal beats, lush orchestration and significant use of piano and acoustic guitar. Spurred by these newfound sonic boundaries and the birth of his daughter Kaia, Transeau sought to create a downtempo album of original works, mainly as lullabies for his daughter. Kaia also sat in Transeau's lap throughout most of the production on the album, and can indeed be seen in several studios with Transeau in the included video for "Good Morning Kaia".

With This Binary Universe, Transeau sought to further his compositional skills, seeking out inspiration from genres such as indie rock and jazz, utilizing their chord progressions and song structures. The album makes extensive use of circuit bending, a technique which consists of intentionally miswiring and short-circuiting keyboards and children's toys to obtain unique sequences of sounds that are later processed and time-corrected. Many of the beats and rhythms in the album were created by computer programs Transeau developed himself to produce the effects he desired, including Stutter Edit and BreakTweaker; both programs have since been released widely by iZotope, who acquired BT's software company Sonik Architects in 2010, although BreakTweaker has since been discontinued.

"All That Makes Us Human Continues" was written entirely in Csound, a music sequencer written in the programming language C, over a period of six months. Several tracks also feature a full 110-piece orchestra; most notably, "The Antikythera Mechanism", which features the orchestra both in original and beat stuttered forms. The only remaining traces of BT's prior musical style are the closing minutes of "The Internal Locus", with its pronounced hip hop beat, and album closer "Good Morning Kaia", an ambient rock piece featuring ocean sounds and dedicated to his daughter.

== Reception ==
Professional ratings
Review scores
Source	Rating
About.com	4.5/5 stars
GetGlue	favorable
Progressive-Sounds	9/10
Sputnikmusic	4.5/5 stars
Tastyfresh	8.7/10
TranceCritic.com	4.5/5 stars

This Binary Universe was a critical success, with several reviewers praising the new sonic directions and sensibilities, and favourable reviews appearing not only in mainstream print but also in instrument and electronic music publications, such as Keyboard Magazine. Being a low-key release, commercial success was minimal. John Diliberto, in his Amazon.com editorial review, wrote favorably of the album, saying, "BT reveals himself as a master of Eno-esque melancholy, as simple melodies evolve through an electro-orchestral instrumental palette." After praising the album's many styles, he concluded his review by stating, "This Binary Universe may be the first ambient symphony of the 21st century."

Tangerine Circus's keyboard player Lalo Mariné cited This Binary Universe as one of his top five favorite albums.

== Track listing ==
=== CD ===
No.	Title	Length
1.	"All That Makes Us Human Continues"	8:15
2.	"Dynamic Symmetry"	11:23
3.	"The Internal Locus"	10:27
4.	"1.618"	11:34
5.	"See You on the Other Side"	14:23
6.	"The Antikythera Mechanism"	10:06
7.	"Good Morning Kaia"	8:11
Total length:		74:19

=== DVD ===
The included DVD contains the entire album in DTS 5.1 surround sound as an audio-only portion, as well as a short film to accompany each song. Four of these short films were created by CG graphics artist Scott Pagano, one by Mondi, one by Dose Productions, and the last consists of Transeau's personal footage of his daughter and himself. The short films included were given a limited theatrical promotion, containing new footage to join the segments together. During the theatre run, BT himself would attend, watching the film with the audience and answering questions before and after each screening.

The films ran the gamut of cinematography, from live action ("Good Morning Kaia") to computer generated animation ("1.618") and traditional animation ("The Internal Locus"). Several videos feature mathematical animations; most notably the fractals in "The Antikythera Mechanism" and use of the golden ratio throughout "1.618". "Good Morning Kaia" consists entirely of footage shot by Transeau of himself and his daughter, at home and on vacation, while a personal message from Transeau to Kaia scrolls across the screen.

"1.618" was included as one of the default music videos on the Zune digital media player. Copies of the album from online retailers (such as the iTunes Store) include only the videos for "Dynamic Symmetry" and "1.618".
