= Scorpio Rising (Death in Vegas album) =

Studio album by Death in Vegas
- Released: 16 September 2002
- Recorded: The Contino Rooms, London, England
- Genre: Electronic, trip hop, neo-psychedelia
- Length: 49:51
- Label: Concrete
- Producer: Richard Fearless, Tim Holmes

Death in Vegas chronology
The Contino Sessions (1999)	Scorpio Rising (2002)	Satan's Circus (2004)

Singles from Scorpio Rising
- 1. "Leather"/"Girls"/"XXX" Released: 22 July 2002; 2. "Hands Around My Throat" Released: 9 September 2002; 3. "Scorpio Rising" Released: 16 December 2002; 4. "So You Say You Lost Your Baby" Released: 7 April 2003 (promo only)

Scorpio Rising is the third studio album by British electronica band Death in Vegas. It was released on 16 September 2002 in the United Kingdom via Concrete Records, and on 17 June 2003 in the United States via Sanctuary Records. The album takes its name from an experimental film by Kenneth Anger. Scorpio Rising features guest vocalists Liam Gallagher, Hope Sandoval, Nicola Kuperus, and Paul Weller, as well as string arrangements by L. Subramaniam. The album was recorded at Death in Vegas' very own studio The Contino Rooms in early 2002, with the strings recorded at Trinity Wave Station in Chennai, India.

The song "Hands Around My Throat" contains samples from the songs "Rock Around the Clock" by Telex (written by Max C. Freedman and Jimmy DeKnight) and "Whitewater" by Tortoise (written by Dan Bitney, Bundy Kien Brown, John Herndon, Doug McCombs, and John McEntire). "23 Lies" includes a sample from "Goin' Back" by The Byrds, written and composed by Carole King and Gerry Goffin. "Scorpio Rising" takes its main riff from "Pictures of Matchstick Men" by Status Quo, and is co-credited to songwriter Francis Rossi.

Several songs on the album have appeared in television advertisements and on film soundtracks:

- "Girls" is featured on the soundtrack to the 2003 film Lost in Translation and 2004 film D.E.B.S..
- "Hands Around My Throat" is featured on the Animatrix soundtrack; in a commercial TV-spot by Sony Ericsson for Sony Ericsson K700i; and in the episode "Once Bitten" of Big Little Lies.
- "Scorpio Rising" is used in a commercial by the Belgian mobile phone operator Base and at the end of the episode "Touch and Go" of ER.
- "Help Yourself" was used in a commercial by the former Czech mobile phone operator Eurotel (now Telefónica O2 Czech Republic); in Johan Kramer's 2003 film The Other Final; in the 2003 Girl Skateboards video Yeah Right!; and in the 2005 film 12 and Holding.

== Reception ==
Professional ratings
Aggregate scores
Source	Rating
Metacritic	68/100
Review scores
Source	Rating
AllMusic	4/5 stars
BBC Music	positive
Chicago Tribune	average
NME	8/10
Pitchfork	6.4/10
PopMatters	5/10
Rolling Stone	3/5 stars
Spin	7/10
Stylus Magazine	B+
Yahoo! Music UK	8/10

The album has a score of 68 out of 100 from Metacritic based on "generally favorable reviews". E! Online gave the album an A and stated: "There's no reason to buy any other electronica CD this year." Filter gave it a score of 84% and said that the sounds "are equally rich and emotive, just not as goblin-esque [as The Contino Sessions]." Alternative Press gave it four stars out of five and said that the album has "Mind-melting Indian-flavored strings... wispy vocal guest turns... and snarling, droning guitar riffs drench rising in a pleasing psychedelic haze." Mojo also gave it four stars and called it "exotic, deep, unique". URB gave it three-and-a-half stars out of five and called it "A curious but highly enjoyable mix of experimental beats and good old-fashioned guitar rock."

Other reviews are pretty average, mixed or negative: Q gave the album three stars out of five and stated: "There's no doubting their enthusiasm but it seems Death in Vegas have compiled a list of great cult albums rather than actually making one themselves." Blender gave it two stars out of five and called it "A strangely dispassionate exercise in record-collection rock." Playlouder gave it one-and-a-half stars out of five and stated that in the album "there are a couple of standout tracks, and the rest falls on its arse."

== Track listing ==
No.	Title	Writer(s)	Length
1.	"Leather"	Richard Fearless, Tim Holmes	3:30
2.	"Girls"	Fearless, Holmes	4:30
3.	"Hands Around My Throat"	Nicola Kuperus, Adam Lee Miller, Fearless, Holmes, Max C. Freedman, Jimmy DeKnight, Dan Bitney, Bundy K. Brown, John Herndon, Doug McCombs, John McEntire	5:08
4.	"23 Lies"	Susan Dillane, Fearless, Holmes, Carole King, Gerry Goffin	3:49
5.	"Scorpio Rising" (featuring Liam Gallagher)	Fearless, Holmes, Ian Button, Francis Rossi, Andrew "Wiz" Whiston, Harry Pratt	5:38
6.	"Killing Smile"	Fearless, Holmes, Hope Sandoval, Dr. Subramaniam	4:49
7.	"Natja"	Fearless, Holmes	3:50
8.	"So You Say You Lost Your Baby"	Gene Clark	3:01
9.	"Diving Horses"	Fearless, Holmes, Dot Allison	5:11
10.	"Help Yourself"	Fearless, Holmes, Sandoval, Subramaniam	10:29

Japanese bonus tracks
No.	Title	Writer(s)	Length
13.	"XXX"	Fearless, Holmes	4:56
14.	"Hands Around My Throat" (Percy X Remix)	Kuperus, Miller, Fearless, Holmes	5:30

== Singles ==
- "Leather"/"Girls" and "XXX" (double 12" vinyl only, 22 July 2002)
- "Hands Around My Throat" (9 September 2002)
- "Scorpio Rising" (16 December 2002)
- "So You Say You Lost Your Baby" (canceled as a commercial single; was set for release on 7 April 2003)

== Personnel ==
=== Death in Vegas ===
- Richard Fearless – production, mixing, keyboards, engineering, songwriting
- Tim Holmes – production, mixing, keyboards, engineering, songwriting
- Terry Miles – keyboards, engineering

=== Vocalists ===
- Nicola Kuperus – vocals on "Hands Around My Throat"
- Susan Dillane – vocals on "23 Lies" and "Girls"
- Liam Gallagher – vocals on "Scorpio Rising"
- Hope Sandoval – vocals on "Killing Smile" and "Help Yourself"
- Paul Weller – vocals on "So You Say You Lost Your Baby"
- Dot Allison – vocals on "Diving Horses"

=== Additional musicians ===
- Ian Button, Danny Hammond – guitar
- Andrew Hackett – guitar on "So You Say You Lost Your Baby"
- Seamus Beaghen – keyboards, guitar
- Mat Flint – bass
- Simon Hanson – drums
- Steve Holley – drums on "So You Say You Lost Your Baby" and "Help Yourself"
- Gary "Mani" Mounfield – bass on "So You Say You Lost Your Baby"
- Pete Stanley – banjo on "Killing Smile"
- James Walbourne – mandolin on "Killing Smile"
- Sara Wilson – cello on "Natja" and "Diving Horses"
- Ganesh – sitar
- L. Subramaniam – lead violin, string arrangements
- Strings on 6, 8 & 10 recorded at Trinity Wave Station in Chennai, India
- S. Sai Kumar – sound engineer for string arrangements
- A.J. Daniel – assistant sound engineer for string arrangements
- Design by FearlessBeaven; band photo by Grant Fleming

== Charts ==
Chart	Peak position
French Albums Chart	22
Norwegian Albums Chart	22
UK Albums Chart	19

== Certifications ==
Region	Certification	Certified units/sales
United Kingdom (BPI)	Silver	60,000^{^}
^{^} Shipments figures based on certification alone.
