= The Contino Sessions =

Studio album by Death in Vegas
- Released: 13 September 1999
- Recorded: The Contino Rooms, London, England
- Genres: Electronic, neo-psychedelia, shoegaze
- Length: 47:59
- Label: Concrete
- Producers: Richard Fearless, Tim Holmes

Death in Vegas chronology
Dead Elvis (1997)	The Contino Sessions (1999)	Scorpio Rising (2002)

Singles from The Contino Sessions
- 1. "Neptune City" Released: 30 August 1999 (vinyl only); 2. "Aisha" Released: 31 January 2000; 3. "Dirge" Released: 24 April 2000; 4. "One More Time" Released: 10 July 2000 (vinyl only)

Professional ratings
Aggregate scores
Source	Rating
Metacritic	80/100
Review scores
Source	Rating
AllMusic	4/5 stars
Alternative Press	4/5
Entertainment Weekly	B+
The Guardian	4/5 stars
Muzik	5/5 stars
NME	9/10
Pitchfork	3.9/10
Q	4/5 stars
Rolling Stone	3.5/5 stars
Uncut	5/5 stars

The Contino Sessions is the second album by the British electronic band Death in Vegas, released in 1999.

As of July 2013 it was certified gold by British Phonographic Industry for 100,000 sold units in UK.

In 2000 the album was nominated for the Mercury Music Prize.

== Legacy ==
The album was included in the book 1001 Albums You Must Hear Before You Die.

The track "Aisha" was featured in the soundtrack of the 2001 racing video game Gran Turismo 3: A-Spec while "Dirge" was featured in the trailer for The Black Dahlia (2006) and the opening scenes of I Care a Lot (2020)

In 2026, Uncut ranked The Contino Sessions at number 85 in their list of "The 200 Greatest Goth Albums". Uncut wrote that, although Death in Vegas sat at the peripherals of musical scenes like big beat and 'skunk rock', they were rarely perceived as goth, which the magazine felt "may have been shortsighted", citing the album's dark sound and "danceable Lynchian scenes."

== Track listing ==
All music is composed by Richard Fearless and Tim Holmes, except where noted.

No.	Title	Lyrics	Music	Length
1.	"Dirge"			5:44
2.	"Soul Auctioneer"	Bobby Gillespie		5:59
3.	"Death Threat"			4:50
4.	"Flying"			7:06
5.	"Aisha"	Iggy Pop	Steve Hellier	5:54
6.	"Lever Street"			3:39
7.	"Aladdin's Story"	Fearless	The Unknown^{[a]}	4:45
8.	"Broken Little Sister"	Jim Reid	Ian Button; Mat Flint; Fearless; Holmes	5:18
9.	"Neptune City"			4:43
Total length:				47:59

Deluxe edition bonus tracks
No.	Title	Music	Length
10.	"Blood Yawning"		7:16
11.	"One More Time"		7:02
12.	"Luther's Funk"	Seamus Beaghen	4:59
Total length:			67:16

Notes

- ^{^[a]} The song was written by Mick Jagger and Keith Richards as The Rolling Stones song, but was never declared for publishing rights.

== Personnel ==
=== Death in Vegas ===
- Richard Fearless – production, keyboards
- Tim Holmes – production, keyboards, engineering

=== Additional musicians ===
- Ian Button – guitar (tracks 1, 3–9)
- Seamus Beaghen – guitar, keyboards (4–7)
- Mat Flint – bass
- Simon Hanson – drums
- Will Blanchard – drums (7, 8), percussion (9),
- Spencer Bewley – handclaps on "Dirge"
- Gary Burns – keyboards on "Neptune City"
- Ali Friend – upright bass on "Lever Street"

=== Vocalists ===
- Dot Allison – vocals on "Dirge", choir arrangement on "Aladdin's Story"
- Bobby Gillespie – vocals on "Soul Auctioneer" and "One More Time"
- Iggy Pop – vocals on "Aisha"
- Jim Reid – vocals on "Broken Little Sister"
- London Community Gospel Choir – choir on "Aladdin's Story"

== Charts ==
Chart (1999)	Peak position
Scottish Albums (Official Charts)	20
UK Albums (Official Charts)	19

== Certifications ==
Region	Certification	Certified units/sales
United Kingdom (BPI)	Gold	100,000^{^}
^{^} Shipments figures based on certification alone.
