= Anxiety Always =

Studio album by ADULT.
- Released: April 7, 2003
- Genre: Electronic, Detroit techno
- Label: Ersatz Audio

ADULT. chronology
Resuscitation (2001)	Anxiety Always (2003)	Gimmie Trouble (2005)

Professional ratings
Aggregate scores
Source	Rating
Metacritic	72/100
Review scores
Source	Rating
AllMusic	4.5/5 stars
Spin	7.5/10
PopMatters	positive
Pitchfork	7.9/10
Splendedzine	positive
URB	4.5/5 stars

Anxiety Always is an album by ADULT., the Detroit, Michigan electronic duo. It was released on April 7, 2003, in the United Kingdom, followed by a release in the United States on April 8, 2003. Although the band had released the album Resuscitation in 2001, Anxiety Always is generally regarded as their first full-length studio album, as Resuscitation primarily compiled earlier single releases.

ADULT. consists of instrumentalist Adam Lee Miller and vocalist Nicola Kuperus. Kuperus is also a visual artist and provided the album's cover art photography. Upon its release Anxiety Always received positive reviews from critics, who praised the duo's expansion of their mostly-synthesizer-based sound, as the album contains prominent guitar and bass guitar elements.

Anxiety Always was released independently by Miller and Kurperus on their Ersatz Audio record label.

== Track listing ==
All songs by Miller and Kurperus.

=== Compact disc ===
1. "The Cold Call"
2. "Shake Your Head"
3. "Glue Your Eyelids Together"
4. "Blank-Eyed Nosebleed"
5. "Turn Your Back"
6. "People, You Can Confuse"
7. "Nothing of the Kind"
8. "Nervous (Wreck)"
9. "We Know How to Have Fun"
10. "Kick in the Shin"

==== Bonus tracks ====
The Australian version of this album came with two bonus tracks.

1. "Foot in Mouth Disease"
2. "Suck the Air"

=== Vinyl ===
1. "Glue Your Eyelids Together"
2. "Blank-Eyed Nosebleed"
3. "(Nervous) Wreck"
4. "People, You Can Confuse"
5. "We Know How to Have Fun"
6. "Shake Your Head"
7. "Turn Your Back"
8. "Nothing of the Kind"
9. "Kick in the Shin"
10. "Foot-in-Mouth Disease"

== Personnel ==
- Jason Brougham: Prop Design
- Sandi Brougham: Photography
- Nicola Kuperus: Vocals, Photography
- Adam Lee Miller: Bass, Sound Effects, Design
