= Hernan Bas =

American painter (born 1978)

- Born: Hernan Bas; 1978 (age 47–48); Miami, Florida, U.S.
- Education: New World School of the Arts, Cooper Union
- Known for: Painting, photography
- Notable work: "It's Super Natural," "Slimfast"

Hernan Bas (born 1978) is an artist based in Miami, Florida. He graduated in 1996 from the New World School of the Arts in Miami.

Bas is known for his depictions of waifs and dandies, who are somewhat based on his own experiences, and his work with the material SlimFast and the paranormal. Over time, Bas says, these characters have grown in his paintings and taken on different roles. Bas is gay and queerness often influences his work in the form of waifs and other young men, typically recurrent characters in his work.

Bas owns a building in Detroit that was renovated by Nicola Kuperus and Adam Lee Miller, the couple behind Detroit electronic music act Adult. The building is on a block called Service Street noted for the number of diverse and accomplished artists that work there, including techno music pioneer Derrick May.

== Early life and education ==
Bas was born in 1978, in Miami, Florida and moved upstate to a small town as a young boy. Bas has described growing up in the town as "kind of like living in the 'X-Files," and has credited it with his interest in the paranormal. He says he had a "spooky childhood" full of "U.F.O. and Bigfoot sightings mixed with ghosts in the woods and a bunch of other bizarre occurrences."

Bas began painting at around three or four years old. He attended the art magnet program in the Miami public school system. Bas said that through the program he effectively began attending art school in seventh grade and by the time he graduated from New World in 1996, he was doing four hours of art every day. Because of his early art education, Bas did not feel that he needed any more formal training and left the Cooper Union after one semester.

== Career ==
While Bas identifies himself as a painter, he has also experimented with other mediums such as film and photography. He has built himself a dark room in the basement of his studio to continue experimenting with photography.

=== Exhibitions (selection) ===
Bas' first solo exhibition in a commercial art gallery took place in 2001 at the Fredric Snitzer Gallery, and was called Hernan’s Merit & the Nouveau Sissies'. In 2004, Bas' artwork was displayed at the 2004 Whitney Biennial at the Whitney Museum in New York City. One year later, in 2005, Bas participated in two more group exhibits, The Triumph of Painting: Part III, at the Saatchi Gallery in London, England and in New Worlds - New Romanticism in Contemporary Art, at Schirn Kuntshalle, in Frankfurt, Germany. Also in 2005, Bas earned a fellowship to Giverny, France, where he got to paint on Claude Monet's estate. In 2007, Bas had a major presentation at the Rubell Family Collection in Miami, which travelled to the Brooklyn Art Museum in 2008. In 2009, Bas participated in the group exhibit "the Collectors," curated by Elmgreen & Dragset for the Nordic and Danish Pavilions at the 53rd Venice Biennale. In 2010, Bas moved his studio from Miami to Detroit, stating he enjoyed the "weirdness" of the city. In 2012, Bas had shows in New York, at the Lehman Maupin Gallery, and in Paris, at Galerie Perrotin, and South Korea. APRIL 12-MAY 27, 2013. FREDRIC SNITZER GALLERY

== Collections ==
Bas' artwork is part of the permanent collections of the Brooklyn Museum of Art, the Museum of Modern Art, and the Whitney Museum of American Art in New York City. The Brooklyn Museum of Art displays the Aesthete's Toy (2004) and Night Fishing (2007) in the permanent collection. Bas has a total of eight works at the Museum of Modern Art in New York City, The Start of the Rain (2004), All By Myself (2004), Idyll in Elysium (2003), The Love of the Exiotic (2003), The One That Got Away (2003), Untitled (2003), The Whores of Venice (Version 1) (2003), and The Whores of Venice (Version 2). In Washington, D.C. he has artwork at the Hirshhorn Museum and Sculpture Garden, as well as the Museum of Contemporary Art in Los Angeles, the Museum of Contemporary Art, North Miami, the Pérez Art Museum Miami, and the Museum of Modern Art in San Francisco. MOCA Los Angeles has four works by Bas in the permanent collection: Hell Hound, Parade Boy, My New Boyfriend, and Sleepwalker. The Museum of Contemporary Art in North Miami has three pieces by Bas in the permanent collection. The collection includes Fleeting Moments (2005), Slim Fast Silhouette (1999-2000), and Ghosts of You (2001).

== Influences ==
Bas has described some of his influences as the lives of saints and the paranormal. He has also cited Oscar Wilde and Charles Baudelaire as inspirations, as well as Joris-Karl Huysman. He has indicated that most of his inspiration comes from the past and he does not pay attention to much contemporary work. His inspirations have also come from Miami, the city where he grew up, especially its "superficial beauty" with which he grew up around and made him feel unattractive as a "skinny boy." Bas also took inspiration from Joseph Beuys' use of painting with fat, as it was one of the first exhibits he saw. He also found inspiration in the Felix Gonzalez-Torres candy piles in his early work with slim fast, allowing his viewers to take a cup of slim fast with them.

Before Bas starts painting, he typically does research, which according to the artist involves reading and watching a lot of movies, which leads to Bas becoming "obsessively interested in any new stories or tales..." According to Bas, these stories can be both fictional or true, and he also looks into artists he may have not noticed before for inspiration. He then likes to "remix" his influences to create something of his own, a process inspired by his musician friends in Detroit who are asked to remix albums. Bas says that sometimes his friends create better remixes than the original song, his ultimate goal is to do the same with his paintings, "sampling" the artists who inspired him until they are unrecognizable as the original artist, becoming his own work instead.

Bas' homosexuality has also been an influence specifically in works like his series Bloodwerk, Bright Young Things, and Supernatural. In his earliest paintings, Bas' characters lived in what the artist described as "fag-limbo," which Bas described as the point between "realizing you're different and telling everyone else that you're different." Bas' artwork mostly consists of "waifs" who play a variety of roles from the Hardy boys to saints. In Bright Young Things, Bas indicated that he was trying to rewrite history to bring queerness to light in a time when it was not widely exposed, in the case of his series, the 1920s. Men's fashion magazines have also served as inspiration for Bas' "waif" figures.

Bas' interest in the paranormal and his sexuality have intersected within his artwork, as the artist says he developed a connection between the paranormal and the other-worldly with homosexuality. Bas says this connection can be seen in his painting, the primordial soup theory (2010). He says he connects homosexuality with the paranormal because he connects the "insane stuff" people perceive about homosexuality to be similar to how people view the paranormal.
