= Deep Cut (band) =

British rock band

- Origin: East London, England
- Years active: 2006–present
- Label: Club AC30
- Members: Mat Flint; Emma Bailey; Simon Flint; Ian Button; Pad Bailey

Deep Cut are a London-based rock group, featuring former Revolver singer/guitarist Mat Flint, Emma Bailey (vocals), Simon Flint (bass guitar), Ian Button (drums) and Pad Bailey (guitar). Mat Flint also played bass guitar for Death In Vegas 1996–2005, along with Ian Button, who played guitar.

== History ==
=== My Thoughts Light Fires ===
The band released their debut single "Commodity" on the Club AC30 record label in 2007, followed by another single "Time To Kill" in 2008 and their debut album My Thoughts Light Fires in 2009. Even though the album was released with minimal press coverage or advertising, it went on to do well in Japan.

=== BBC's Glastonbury Festival ===
In June 2011, Deep Cut was a featured artist in the BBC's Glastonbury Festival (22 – 26 June 2011), having performed on the BBC Introducing Stage on 24 June.

=== Disorientation ===
Their second album Disorientation was released in September 2011, and was preceded by the single "Somethings Got to Give". Unlike the first album, Disorientation (and associated singles) received a lot more coverage in the mainstream press.

=== Remixes ===
Throughout 2012, Deep Cut worked on remixes for other bands, including Ringo Deathstarr's "Shadow", Megaphonic Thrift's "Tune Your Mind", Velochrome's "The Gap in your Head", Daniel Land's "Eyes Wide Shut", and Tim Burgess' "I Love White".

== Band members ==
- Mat Flint – vocals, guitars
- Emma Bailey – vocals
- Simon Flint – bass
- Ian Button – drums
- Pad Bailey – guitars

== Discography ==
=== Albums ===
- My Thoughts Light Fires (2009), Club AC30
- Disorientation (2011), Club AC30
- Different Planet (2019), Gare du Nord Records

=== Singles ===
- "Commodity" (2007), Club AC30
- "Time To Kill" (2008), Club AC30
- "Something's Got To Give" (2011), Club AC30
