= Milk It =

Milk It: The Best of Death in Vegas

Greatest hits album by Death in Vegas
- Released: 7 February 2005
- Recorded: The Contino Rooms, London, England
- Genre: Electronic rock
- Label: Sony/BMG
- Producers: Richard Fearless, Tim Holmes, Steve Hellier

Death in Vegas chronology
Satan's Circus (2004)	Milk It: The Best of Death in Vegas (2005)	The Best of Death in Vegas (2007)

Milk It: The Best of Death in Vegas is a compilation album by Death in Vegas, released on 7 February 2005 in the UK and on 23 February 2005 in Japan. Disc one is a collection of some of the band's best album tracks, while disc two is a bonus disc of remixes. The album was not released in the US.

NME described the album as "the antithesis of the grinning 'we’re all mates' showbiz of Band Aid 20."

== Track listing ==
1. "Aisha"
2. "So You Say You Lost Your Baby"
3. "Dirt"
4. "Rekkit"
5. "Scorpio Rising"
6. "Soul Auctioneer"
7. "Hands Around My Throat"
8. "All That Glitters"
9. "Dirge"
10. "Girls"
11. "Rematerialised"
12. "Broken Little Sister" (Japanese version-only bonus track)

=== Bonus disc ===
1. "Aisha" (Trevor Jackson mix)
2. "Hands Around My Throat" (ADULT. mix)
3. "Hands Around My Throat" (UXB mix)
4. "Scorpio Rising" (The Polyphonic Spree mix)
5. "One More Time"
6. "Dirge" (Slam remix)
7. "Dirge" (Cossack mix)
8. "Dirt" (Mullet mix)
9. "Twist And Crawl" (Full mix)
10. "Rocco" (Dave Clarke mix)
11. "Rekkit" (Two Lone Swordsmen remix) (Effective Machine)
12. "Neptune City" (Two Lone Swordsmen remix)

== Personnel ==
- Richard Fearless
- Tim Holmes
- Steve Hellier
- Dot Allison – vocals on "Dirge"
- Bobby Gillespie – vocals on "Soul Auctioneer", "One More Time"
- Iggy Pop – vocals on "Aisha"
- Nicola Kuperus – vocals on "Hands Around My Throat"
- Liam Gallagher – vocals on "Scorpio Rising"
- Paul Weller – vocals on "So You Say You Lost Your Baby"
- Jim Reid - vocals on "Broken Little Sister"
