= Resuscitation (album) =

Studio album by ADULT.
- Released: April 23, 2001
- Genre: Electronic
- Length: 58:21
- Label: Ersatz Audio
- Producer: Adam Lee Miller, Nicola Kuperus

ADULT. chronology
Resuscitation (2001)	Anxiety Always (2003)

Professional ratings
Review scores
Source	Rating
AllMusic	link
Pitchfork	8.7/10 link

Resuscitation is a 2001 album released by American electronic music duo ADULT. Before this release, ADULT.'s output had consisted of various EPs and 12 inch singles released independently; this is actually a compilation album of many of their earlier singles. A bulk of the songs are presented on Resuscitation in remixed or re-recorded forms.

ADULT.'s members, Adam Lee Miller (music) and Nicola Kuperus (vocals and music) distributed the album on their own label, Ersatz Audio. Kuperus, a visual artist, is also responsible for the album's cover art photography.

== Track listing ==
1. "Lost Love" (originally released in 1999)
2. "Hand to Phone (Cordless Mix)" (originally released in 2000)
3. "Minors at Night (Still Sick)" (originally released in 2000)
4. "New Object (edit)" (originally released in 2000)
5. "Contagious" (originally released in 2000)
6. "Mouth to Mouth"
7. "Nausea (Restructured)" (originally released in 2000)
8. "Pressure Suit" (originally released in 1999)
9. "Dispassionate Furniture (Reupholstered)" (originally released in 1998)
10. "Human Wreck (radio edit)" (originally released in 1999)
11. "Side-Swiped (extended mix)" (originally released in 2000)
12. "Your Lies" (originally released in 2000)
13. "Skinlike (Equation mix)" (originally released in 2000)
14. "Private Conversations" (originally released in 1998, as "Plasma Co.")
