= FabricLive.23 =

Compilation album by Death in Vegas
- Released: August 2005
- Recorded: 2005
- Genre: Electronic music
- Length: 71:50
- Label: Fabric
- Producer: Death in Vegas

Death in Vegas chronology
| Satan's Circus (2004) | FabricLive.23 (2005) | Trans-Love Energies (2011) |

FabricLive chronology
| FabricLive.22 (2005) | FabricLive.23 (2005) | FabricLive.24 (2005) |

FabricLive.23 is a DJ mix compilation album by English electronic music group Death in Vegas, as part of the FabricLive Mix Series.

== Reception ==
FabricLive.23 was well received by Allmusic writer David Jeffries, who gave it three and a half stars out of five, calling it "a satisfying mix that's more headphones than dancefloor...step two in Death in Vegas' thrilling rebirth as a heady mavericks". Andrew McLachlan, reviewing the album for PopMatters, also viewed it positively, calling it "a great record...a record for Death in Vegas fans but also for electronica fans".

== Track listing ==
1. Solvent - Science With Synthesizers - Ghostly International
2. Death in Vegas - Zugaga - Drone
3. Slacknoise Vs Plexus - Ana Tak 2 - Minus Inc.
4. Death in Vegas - Heil Xanax - Drone
5. Alex Smoke - Lost In Sound - Soma Recordings
6. Mossa - Cheap Therapy - Mo's Ferry Productions
7. Cybotron - Alleys Of Your Mind - Tresor
8. Solvent - Think Like Us (Ectomorph Mix) - Ghostly International
9. Alex Cortex - Phlogiston - PAL
10. Dinky - Acid In My Fridge - Cocoon Recordings
11. Mathew Jonson - Marionette - Wagon Repair
12. Alex Smoke - Neds - Vakant
13. Wighnomy Brothers - Pele Bloss - Freude-am-Tanzen Recordings
14. Death in Vegas - Reigen (Acid Mix) - Drone
15. Analog Fingerprints - Accent - Pigna Records
16. Blue Ketchuppp - Don't Trust Your Computer - Bee Records
17. Death in Vegas - Natja (Scorpio Rising Mix) - Sony BMG
18. Mathew Jonson - Typerope - Itiswhatitis Recordings
19. John Dahlbäck - Jenna - Morris Audio
