= Gimmie Trouble =

Studio album by ADULT.
- Released: October 11, 2005
- Genre: Electronic, electro, Detroit techno, post-punk
- Length: 39:43
- Label: Thrill Jockey

ADULT. chronology
| Anxiety Always (2003) | Gimmie Trouble (2005) | Why Bother? (2007) |

Professional ratings
Aggregate scores
| Source | Rating |
|---|---|
| Metacritic | 65/100 link |
Review scores
| Source | Rating |
| Alternative Press | Nov 2005, p.224 |
| Allmusic | link |
| Almost Cool | 47.5% link |
| Pitchfork | link |
| Prefix Magazine | 8/10 link |
| Stylus Magazine | D link |

Gimmie Trouble is the second album released by the Detroit, Michigan electronic duo ADULT. in 2005.

For this album, they added a new guitarist to the line-up, Sam Consiglio. He would leave the band early in 2006.

== Track listing ==
1. "Gimmie Trouble" (Nicola Kuperus, Adam Lee Miller) – 3:59
2. "Bad Ideas" (Sam Consiglio, Kuperus, Miller) – 2:58
3. "Scare Up the Birds" (Kuperus, Miller) – 3:30
4. "Thought I Choked" (Consiglio, Kuperus, Miller) – 3:31
5. "Stranger Mistake" (Kuperus, Miller) – 3:28
6. "Disappoint the Youth" (Consiglio, Kuperus, Miller) – 4:03
7. "In My Nerves" (Kuperus, Miller) – 3:32
8. "Turn into Fever" (Consiglio, Kuperus, Miller) – 2:35
9. "Helen Bach" – 3:18
10. "Still Waiting" (Consiglio, Kuperus, Miller) – 2:28
11. "Lovely Love" (Consiglio, Kuperus, Miller) – 2:40
12. "Seal Me In" (Consiglio, Kuperus, Miller) – 2:41
