= David Cronenberg's Wife =

- Origin: England
- Genres: post punk outsider music anti-folk
- Years active: 2004-
- Label: Blang

David Cronenberg's Wife is a London-based band. The name is taken from the Canadian filmmaker and actor David Cronenberg.

== Profile ==
Described as "where genius meets idiocy" by BBC Radio 2's Mark Lamarr, the band's lyrics combine dark subject matter with an off-kilter humour. They released their first single "I Couldn't Get Off" in 2007, followed up by two singles and their first album Bluebeard's Rooms in 2008. The album was recorded by Simon Trought (formerly of Tompaulin and Hayman, Watkins, Trout & Lee), Dot Allison, and guitarist Ian Button (formerly of the Thrashing Doves and Death in Vegas). It was described in The Fly as "one of the albums of the year". Other reviews, however, were more critical of the album's dark subject matter and "repugnant imagery".

In August 2009, the band released their fourth single "The Fight Song" and played a second session on Marc Riley's BBC 6 Music show. This was followed by an appearance on Cerys Matthews' show, also on BBC 6 Music, in October.

The band's second album Hypnagogues was released in November 2009, with a noticeably more personal feel to the lyrics and a less harsh sound, even approaching alt country on some of the tracks. The magazine NME called it "a promising work in progress" with Drowned in Sound naming opening song "Sweden" (the band's sixth single) "one of the tracks of the year", adding that "it stands so far out from the rest that it encumbers the rest of the album."

Their third album Don't Wait to be Hunted to Hide was released in December 2012, and features some of the band's most controversial songs, causing one reviewer to call it the "most truly controversial I’ve heard all year", adding that it may "upset and unsettle" some listeners. In December 2012, the band supported The Fall at the Islington Assembly Hall.

The band had two previously unreleased tracks featured on Trashmouth Record's 2014 compilation Thinking About Moving to Hastings along with songs by Fat White Family, Pit Ponies and Warmduscher. In October 2018, David Cronenberg's Wife released a new EP entitled The Octoberman Sequence on 12" vinyl, and their fourth album, The Ship (Necrologies), was released in March 2020. The album's first single, "Hannity Comes Home", was described by The Indiependent as one of the best singles of the first five months of the year.

In January 2023, the band announced it was working on its fifth album. It was released on 1 May 2026 and entitled "The Department of Biology".

Band members are currently singer & songwriter Tom Mayne, keyboard player Mary Boe, guitar players Adam Croucher and David Wolfe, drummer Tom Hemington, violin player and guitarist Thomas Alder and bassist Ana Chora. Former bassist Ian Button also produced many of the tracks from the first three albums.

== Singles ==
- "I Couldn't Get Off" / "My Date With Jenna Bush" / "I'm on the Booze, Mama [Norwood version, mix No. 2]" (Download only) / "My Ukrainian Girlfriend" (download only) - (7" vinyl/download) (Blang Records - 2007)
- "My Best Friend's Going Out With a Girl I Like" / "Altair Voyager" - (7" vinyl/download) (Blang Records - 2008)
- "Runaway Pram (English/German/Russian versions)" - (download) (Blang Records - 2008)
- "The Fight Song" / "Suicide-Stretch Out" / "I Do Know [Hackney version]" / "I Couldn't Get Off [Solo version]" - (download) (Blang Records - 2009)
- "Jailbird / "Eugene" / "A Bad Feeling About Anna Karenina" / "Harry the Morgue [Church version]" - (download) (Blang Records - November 2009)
- "Sweden" / "Cymru" [Sweden in Welsh] / "Sweden [Oculus III remix]" / "Sweden [8Spirit remix]" / "Sweden [David Apple remix]" - (download) (Blang Records - September 2010)
- "Spiked" / "Music is my Enemy" / "Jonny Bentham's Dilemma [Casio version]" / "Spiked [Oculus III remix]" - (download) (Blang Records - December 2012)
- "The Man at the Back of the Woods" / "Losing It (With You Tonight)" / "My Best Friend's Going Out With a Girl I Like [Casio Version]" / "The Man at the Back of the Woods [David Apple remix]" (download) (Blang Records - May 2013)
- "Such a Sweet Boy!" / "Pushin' Too Hard" / "The Rustler" / "Weil Du so lieb bist!" ["Sweet Boy" in German] (download) (Blang Records - March 2014)
- "Hannity Comes Home" / "Eternal Shade (for Gary Rice)" / "Jailbird" [Bergegrend Version] / "Sweden" [Bergegrend Version] (download) (Blang Records - January 2020)
- "Black Scorpion Theme" / "Mongolia" (Bandcamp exclusive 7" vinyl self release - May 2025)
- "Chekhov's Bordello" (Blang Records - April 2026)

== Albums ==
- Bluebeard's Rooms (CD/download) (Blang Records - August 2008)
- Hypnagogues (CD/download) (Blang Records - November 2009)
- Don't Wait to be Hunted to Hide (CD/download) (Blang Records - December 2012)
- The Octoberman Sequence EP (Vinyl/download) (Blang Records - October 2018)
- The Ship (Necrologies) (CD/download) (Blang Records - March 2020)
- Department of Biology (Vinyl/download) (Blang Records - May 2026)

== Compilation tracks ==
- "Sweden [Version 1]" on "Fruit Machine" (Blang Records - 2006)
- "Coming To Your Hometown [Norwood version]" on "AFUK & I (Vol. 1)" (AFUK Records - 2007)
- "I'm on the Booze, Mama [Norwood version, original mix]" and "I Do Know [Early Solo Version]" on "Somewhere Between Heaven & Woolworths" (Fortune Teller Records - 2007)
- "I'm on the Booze, Mama [Album version]" on "SWEETFA3" (Strummerville Charity compilation - 2009)
- "Suicide Stretch Out [Prison friendly mix]" on "Breaking Rocks" (Silverdoor Records - July 2010)
- "The Diplomat" on "Electio Pop" (Helen Llewelyn Product 19 - September 2010)
- "Drawn Again [Original Version]" on "Audio Antihero presents: "REGAL VS STEAMBOAT" for Rape Crisis (Audio Antihero - May 2013)
- "Free State Congo" [Vinyl/CD versions] & "All of Me" [CD version only] on "Thinking About Moving to Hastings" (Trashmouth Records - October 2014)
- "Rules [Fearnley Button Version]" on "Brighton Bands Compilation II" [audio cassette] (Big Salad Records - 2019)
- "Funeral Home / Rules" [Live, Windmill Brixton, 19/10/19] on "Jack Medley's Secure Compilation - Songs in the Key of K" (Bandcamp - May 2020)
- "Who Are You?" on "Blang on Blang: Star-Crossed Covers" (Blang Records - November 2025)
- "I Looked Into Your Eyes" on "Sleep It Off – A Tribute to The Brazen Hussies" (Jezus Factory Records - April 2026)
