= Trouble in the Home =

Studio album by Thrashing Doves
- Released: 1989
- Genre: Rock
- Length: 43:33
- Label: A&M
- Producer: Gavin MacKillop, Thrashing Doves

Thrashing Doves chronology
Bedrock Vice (1987)	Trouble in the Home (1989)	Affinity (1992)

Singles from Trouble in the Home
- 1. "Reprobate's Hymn" Released: 1988; 2. "Another Deadly Sunset" Released: 1988; 3. "Angel Visit" Released: April 1989; 4. "Lorelei" Released: 1990

Trouble in the Home is the second album by the English band Thrashing Doves, released in 1989. "Angel Visit" peaked at No. 97 on the UK Singles Chart and No. 14 on Billboard's Modern Rock Tracks chart.

== Critical reception ==
Professional ratings
Review scores
Source	Rating
AllMusic	1.5/5 stars
Los Angeles Times	3/5 stars

The Toronto Star noted that, "though the Foremans' songwriting is still full of edgy asides, bittersweet incongruities and juicy hooks ... there's an underlying sadness to much of Trouble in the Home." The Calgary Herald wrote that "there are some stinging guitar licks ... but the overall feel to the Thrashing Doves is one of a subtle, bittersweet sensuality."

The Los Angeles Times deemed the album "forceful, melodic rock with lush (but not syrupy) arrangements." Trouser Press concluded that "the music is still wholly lacking in purpose and conviction, and the lyrics' cagey religious references are too coy by half."

== Track listing ==
All tracks written by Brian Foreman & Ken Foreman.

1. "Reprobate's Hymn" – 4:28
2. "Angel Visit" – 3:17
3. "Sister Deals" – 3:49
4. "Lorelei" – 4:32
5. "Trouble in the Home" – 4:29
6. "Another Deadly Sunset" – 4:23
7. "Mary Mary" – 4:05
8. "Like Heartbreak" – 3:31
9. "Late Show" – 3:26
10. "Candy Woman" – 5:16
11. "Domestic Rainchild" – 2:38

== B-sides ==
- "Jesus on the Payroll #2" (second version with slightly different lyrics)
- "She Do Me"
- "Babe Like a Rock"
- "Girl Called Houdini"
- "You Don't Believe in Me, Do You

== Personnel ==
- Ken Foreman – vocals, lead guitar
- Brian Foreman – synthesizer, harmonica, backing vocals
- Ian Button – guitar, bass guitar, backing vocals
- Kevin Sargent – drums, percussion, backing vocals
- David Palmer – drums
- James Eller – bass guitar
- Gail Ann Dorsey – bass guitar, vocals
- Angie Giles – backing vocals
- Zeeteah Massiah – backing vocals
- Barry Wickens – lead violin
