= Bedrock Vice =

1987 studio album by Thrashing Doves

Studio album by Thrashing Doves
- Released: 1981//:okHTTP/
- Length: 46:51
- Label: A&M
- Producer: Bruce Lampcov, Chris Thomas, Jimmy Iovine, Thrashing Doves

Thrashing Doves chronology
Bedrock Vice (1981)	Trouble in the Home (1989)

Singles from Bedrock Vice
- 1. "Matchstick Flotilla" Released: June 1986; 2. "Biba's Basement" Released: 1986; 3. "Beautiful Imbalance" Released: January 1987; 4. "Jesus on the Payroll" Released: 1987; 5. "The Grinding Stone" Released: 1987

Professional ratings
Review scores
Source	Rating
AllMusic	4/5 stars
Record Mirror	2/5 stars

Bedrock Vice is the debut album by English band Thrashing Doves. It was released in 1987 on LP and CD by A&M Records and reissued in 2015 by Cherry Red Records with bonus tracks.

== Track listing ==
All tracks written by Brian Foreman & Ken Foreman.

1. "Beautiful Imbalance" – 4:01
2. "Matchstick Flotilla" – 4:37
3. "The Grinding Stone" – 4:35
4. "Killer for You" – 4:18
5. "Rochdale House" – 4:13
6. "Biba's Basement" – 4:13
7. "Castroville Street" – 5:24
8. "Magdalena" – 3:40
9. "Tinderbox Man" – 4:26
10. "Northern Civil War Party" – 3:35
11. "Jesus on the Payroll" – 3:50
12. "Hollywood Maids" – 5:14 (UK CD Bonus Track)

2015 Expanded Edition Bonus Tracks

1. "The All Night Chemist" – 5:01
2. "Sympathy for the Devil" (Rolling Stones cover) – 5:16
3. "Jesus on the Payoll (Street Groove)" – 3:30
4. "Self Infliction Crew" – 4:00
5. "The Receiver" – 4:05
6. "Mission Creep (A New Jesus on the Payroll)" – 4:09 (previously unreleased)

== Personnel ==
- Ken Foreman – vocals, lead guitar
- Brian Foreman – synthesizer, harmonica, backing vocals
- Ian Button – guitar, bass guitar, backing vocals
- Kevin Sargent – drums, percussion, backing vocals
- Hari Sajjan – bass guitar
