= Sergeant Buzfuz =

- Genres: Alternative rock, indie folk, psychedelic pop, anti-folk
- Years active: 1993-present
- Labels: Blang, Audio Gland
- Members: Joe Murphy; Richard Bentley; Ian Button; Polly MacLean; Eilish McCracken; David Woolf
- Past members: Kate Arnold; William Barr; George Brufton; Richard Cahill; Jon Clayton; Joss Cope; Stu Crane; Andy Crowe; Cherrie Fox; Stephen Gilchrist; John Paul Jones; Rich Keeble; Martin Parker; Chris Thomas; Tim Victor
- Website: Official website

Sergeant Buzfuz are a six-piece band based in London and Sheffield. Their musical style has been referred to as psych-pop, and folk-punk. They take their name from Serjeant Buzfuz, the prosecuting counsel in the trial scene in The Pickwick Papers by Charles Dickens. The current line-up consists of core member Joe Murphy (vocals, guitar), Eilish McCracken (keyboards, violin, flute), Ian Button (drums), Polly MacLean (backing vocals, melodica), Richard Bentley (bass) and Dave Woolf (lead guitar). To date the band have released seven studio albums, two extended plays (EP), and seven singles.

== History ==
The band was originally formed by Joe Murphy (vocals, guitar) in 1993 along with Chris Thomas (guitar), Cherrie Fox (drums) and Richard Cahill (bass). This incarnation of the band ceased performing in 1996, after which Murphy continued as a solo artist (still using the Sergeant Buzfuz name) on the single "Plugged In" (2001) and album Obsessive Compulsion Pour Homme (2001), on which Murphy played all instruments, other than sitar played by John Paul Jones. Timothy Victor (Folk Orchestra, Broken Family Band, Chris T-T) would perform banjo with Murphy at this time.

The album Fire Horse (2004) was again mostly a solo recording but by the time of its release Sergeant Buzfuz were performing as a full band again with Kate Arnold on hammered dulcimer, Eilish McCracken (Rose McDowall) on violin, Jon Clayton (who has produced all Sergeant Buzfuz albums in his One Cat studio) on cello and Martin Parker on drums. This line-up recorded 2006's The Jewelled Carriageway. Timothy Victor contributed banjo to both Fire Horse and The Jewelled Carriageway. In 2008 Jon Clayton left to concentrate on his many other bands and was replaced by John Paul Jones (not the Led Zeppelin bassist).

The band's fourth album was 2009's High Slang. During the recording of the album, Parker was ousted and replaced by Ian Button (Death in Vegas) on drums for the remainder of the recording. Rich Keeble, now a TV comedy actor, took over the drum stool and William Barr joined on mandolin in time for the album's release, the new line-up recording BBC 6Music sessions for Tom Robinson (2008) and Marc Riley (2009). By the time the band recorded a second session for Tom Robinson in 2010, Keeble (now an actor) had left to be replaced by Ian Button, and Jones had been ousted and replaced with Stephen Gilchrist (Art Brut, Graham Coxon).

Go To The Devil And Shake Yourself (2012) was a concept album documenting the history of the papacy. By the time of its release Gilchrist had left to be replaced by Andy Crowe on bass, and Kate Arnold had left to form Fear Of The Forest, teaming up again with Sergeant Buzfuz producer and ex-cellist Jon Clayton. Murphy and Polly MacLean, singer with Slate Islands, performed the album for sixteen nights at the Edinburgh Free Fringe in 2012. In the same year, Crowe left and was replaced by George Brufton on bass who played on, but left before the release of, 2015's Balloons For Thin Linda. By the time of release the band had expanded to a seven piece line-up with Polly MacLean on backing vocals, Stu Crane on electric cigar box slide guitar and Joss Cope (Biff Bang Pow!, Crash, brother of Julian Cope) on bass.

During 2020's Covid lockdown the band released seventh album Fox Pop. It received six plays by Gideon Coe on BBC 6 Music and positive reviews but the band were unable to tour the album.

After the disruption of lockdowns the line-up changed again. Cope, Barr and Crane had moved to Helsinki, Dublin and Leicester respectively. They were replaced by Richard (deXter) Bentley, host of Resonance FM Hello Goodbye show on bass and Dave Woolf (of ex-Blang bands Corporal Machine and the Bombers and Milk Kan) and currently also playing with The Awkward Silences and David Cronenberg's Wife, on lead guitar. This new line-up has a more energetic punkier sound. In 2025 they supported Jeffrey Lewis & The Voltage on a mini UK tour.

== Blang Records ==
In 2002, Murphy began promoting a monthly night named Blang at London's 12 Bar Club where he regularly put on acts from the New York anti-folk scene. Blang became the hub for British antifolk music. Murphy continued to promote his Blang nights at the 12 Bar Club until 2012, ending on the ten year anniversary. The early Sergeant Buzfuz records were released on his own Audio Gland label. In 2005 he launched a new Blang label with the Fruit Machine compilation of acts who had played at the live nights. Subsequent Sergeant Buzfuz records have all been released on Blang, which he co-runs with Jules Dakin (of the bands Trailer Crash & Lucy's Diary), Paul Finlay, Beth Soan and La Staunton, host of Reprezent FM's In/Tro show. The label has released records by many acts including Jeffrey Lewis, David Cronenberg's Wife, Thomas Truax, Brix & The Extricated, Sheepy and The Awkward Silences. In 2025 Blang celebrated 20 years with the Blang On Blang: Star-Crossed Covers LP featuring various acts covering each other's songs.

== Band members ==
Current members

- Joe Murphy - vocals, guitar (1993–present)
- Eilish McCracken - fiddle, flute, whistle (2006–present)
- Ian Button - drums (2008, 2009–present)
- Polly MacLean - backing vocals (2013–present)
- Dave Woolf - lead guitar (2023–present)
- Richard Bentley - bass guitar (2022–present)

Former members

- William Barr - mandolin (2008–2022)
- George Brufton - bass (2012–2013)
- Joss Cope - bass (2014–2021)
- Stu Crane - guitar (2014–2022)
- Andy Crowe - bass (2011-2012)
- Stephen Gilchrist - bass (2011)
- John Paul Jones - bass (2008-2011)
- Kate Arnold - hammered dulcimer, violin, vox (2001–2010)
- Rich Keeble - drums (2008-2009)
- Martin Parker - drums (2003–2008)
- Jon Clayton - cello (2003–2008)
- Timothy Victor - banjo (2001, 2004–2006)
- Cherrie Fox - drums (1993-1996)
- Chris Thomas - guitar (1993-1996)
- Richard Cahill - bass (1994-1995)

== Discography ==
All released on Blang except where stated.

=== Studio albums ===
- Obsessive Compulsion Pour Homme (January 2001, CD Audio Gland Records)
- Fire Horse (March 2004, CD Audio Gland Records)
- The Jewelled Carriageway (September 2006, CD/download)
- High Slang (February 2009, CD/download)
- Go To The Devil And Shake Yourself (April 2012, CD/download)
- Balloons For Thin Linda (April 2015, CD/vinyl/download)
- Fox Pop (July 2020) (CD/download)

=== EPs ===
- Knock Knock Knock (February 2011, download)
- Humble Pie (September 2016, digital and ltd CD)

=== Singles ===
- "Plugged In" (January 2001, 7" Audio Gland Records)
- "Here Come The Popes Part 3" (September 2008, 7" vinyl)
- "God To Holloway" (January 2009, download)
- "Here Come The Popes Part 4" / "Here Come The Cops" (March 2010, download)
- "Danny's Room" / "Molly's Bar" (May 2011, download)
- "Gold Feelings" / "Cuckoo Boogie" (December 2014)
- "S6 Girls" / "S6 Sunday Morning" (March 2015)

=== Compilation Appearances ===
- "Indelible" on Fruit Machine (26 Seeds From The London Underground) (September 2005)
- "Too Stupid" on AFUK & I (Vol 1): Up The Anti (AFUK Records 2007)
- "Adieu To All Judges And Juries" (Murphy solo) on Shirley Inspired (June 2015, Earth)
- "Down With The Creeps" on 12 Bar Legacy Collection (Volume 9) mustard-coloured 7 inch vinyl (London Callin' Records, Sep 2023)

=== Joe Murphy solo (as Joe Buzfuz) ===
- "Now That I'm The Mayor Of London" (Download Single - March 2016)
