= Scottish Alternative Music Awards =

Annual music awards in Scotland

Scottish Alternative Music Awards (SAMAs)
- Awarded for: Best emerging artists in Scotland
- Location: Scotland, UK
- First award: 2010
- Website: officialsama.co.uk

The Scottish Alternative Music Awards (SAMAs) is an annual music award based in Glasgow, Scotland. The SAMAs present awards in seven categories to the best emerging artists in Scotland.

== History ==
The SAMAs were founded in 2009 by music entrepreneur Richy Muirhead, initially as a university project. The project grew to become the awards that exist today, with the first SAMAs being held in 2010 at The Classic Grand, Glasgow. In subsequent years the awards have been hosted at The Garage, Glasgow.

The SAMAs have grown year on year and have drawn support from the likes of broadcaster Vic Galloway, DJ Jim Gellatly, and various artists and sponsors.

The awards have helped develop the careers of Fatherson (Best Rock/Alternative, SAMA 2012), Hector Bizerk (Best Hip-Hop, SAMA 2014), and Model Aeroplanes (Best Newcomer, SAMA 2014).

== Past winners ==
Year	Award	Winner	Nominated
2012	Best Live Act	We Were Promised Jetpacks	
2012	Best Acoustic	Brown Bear & The Bandits	
2012	Best Newcomer	Bwani Junction	
2012	Best Rock/Alternative	Fatherson	
2012	Best Electronic	Fridge Magnets	
2012	Best Metal	Ten Tonne Dozer	
2012	Best Hip-Hop	Madhat McGore	
2013	Best Live Act	The OK Social Club	
2013	Best Acoustic	Little Fire	
2013	Best Newcomer	The Holy Ghosts	
2013	Best Rock/Alternative	Culann	
2013	Best Electronic	Plum	
2013	Best Metal	Bear Arms	
2013	Best Hip-Hop	Gasp	
2014	Best Live Act	The Mickey 9's	
2014	Best Electronic	Machines in Heaven	
2014	Best Newcomer	Model Aeroplanes	
2014	Best Acoustic	Jack Rowberry	
2014	Best Hip-Hop	Hector Bizerk	
2014	Best Rock/Alternative	Forest Fires	
2015	Best Live Act	Colonel Mustard & The Dijon 5	Errors; Ded Rabbit; Copper Lungs; Kathryn Joseph; Neon Waltz
2015	Best Electronic	Crash Club	BDY_PRTS; SEØUEL; Our Future Glory; Lockah; Clyde Rouge
2015	Best Metal	Divides	Mountains Under Oceans; The Amorettes; Holy Mountain; Seed Of Sorrow; Blackened Ritual
2015	Best Newcomer	Bella And The Bear	Martha Ffion; White Baer; Man Of Moon; Alphas; Lionel
2015	Best Acoustic	Sean C Kennedy	C Duncan; The Jellyman's Daughter; Stella Reilly; Best Girl Athlete; Dr Wook
2015	Best Hip-Hop	Spring Break	Mog; Delighted Peoples; Dj Yemster & Hextasy; The Ill Collective; Bigg Taj & Speesixnine
2016	Best Acoustic	Michael Cassidy	Chrissy Barnacle; Finn LeMarinel; Laurence Made Me Cry
2016	Best Electronic	Be Charlotte	Happy Meals; Sad City; Theo Kottis
2016	Best Hip Hop	sYmba	Ciaran Mac; Konchis; Ransom FA
2016	Best Live Act	Gerry Cinnamon	Bossy Love; Miracle Glass Company; Model Aeroplanes
2016	Best Metal	Perpetua	Akord; Centrilia; From Sorrow To Serenity
2016	Best Newcomer	The Ninth Wave	Lush Purr; Monkoora; Rapid Tan
2016	Best Rock/Alternative	Bloodlines	Campfires; GANGS; The Van T's
2017	Best Acoustic	Lewis Capaldi	Siobhan Wilson; Callum Beattie; Gus Harrower
2017	Best Electronic	Stillhound	Illyus & Barrientos; Sam Gellaitry; Golden Teacher
2017	Best Hip Hop	Kid Robotik	Shogun; Empress; Asthmatic Astronaut
2017	Best Live Act	The Van T's	Indigo Velvet; Babe; Oskar Braves
2017	Best Metal	Tiberius	Frontierer; Revulsion; Sithu Aye
2017	Best Newcomer	SHREDD!	Codist; Jutland Songs; Hairband
2017	Best Rock/Alternative	Shambolics	Rascalton; Pure Grief; Medicine Men
2018	Best Live Act	Lylo	Free Love; Rapid Tan; Future Get Down
2018	Best Acoustic	Megan Airlie	Blue Rose Code; Hamish Hawk; Zoë Bestel
2018	Best Newcomer	The Dunts	Zoe Graham; Beta Waves; Crystal
2018	Best Rock/Alternative	Declan Welsh & The Decadent West	ST MARTiiNS; Lucia; Voodoos
2018	Best Electronic	Lo Kindre	Cucina Povera; Lanark Artefax; LAPS
2018	Best Metal	Tenements	Bleed From Within; Neshiima; Lotus Eater
2018	Best Hip-Hop	Solareye	The Honey Farm; Kobi Onyame; Jackal Trades
2019	Best Live Act	The Vegan Leather	Bossy Love; Crystal; Gallus
2019	Best Acoustic	Zoe Graham	Aaron Smith; Annie Booth; Lizabett Russo
2019	Best Newcomer	VanIves	corto.alto; Cloth; Kapil Seshasayee
2019	Best Rock/Alternative	The Snuts	Fabric Bear; Heavy Rapids; Walt Disco
2019	Best Electronic	Ok Button	Ela Orleans; Tallisker; SHHE
2019	Best Metal	Inferiem	Centrilia; From Sorrow To Serenity; Godeater
2019	Best Hip-Hop	Steg G	Billy Got Waves; Delivery Room; Nova Scotia The Truth
2020	Best Live Act	Callum Easter	Free Love; Kapil Seshasayee; Still House Plants
2020	Best Acoustic	Jenny Sturgeon	Bobby Kakouris; Fair Mothers; Man of the Minch
2020	Best Newcomer	TAAHLIAH	Nathan Somevi; Kohla; Tamzene
2020	Best Rock/Alternative	Fauves	Dead Pony; HYYTS; Pleasure Heads
2020	Best Electronic	TAAHLIAH	Lady Neptune; Pleasure Pool; Tommy Perman
2020	Best Metal	Saor	Bleed From Within; King Witch; Neshiima
2020	Best Hip-Hop	India Rose	CLING; LOTOS; Louis Seivwright
2021	Best Live Act	Bemz	Andrew Wasylyk; Ray Aggs; Tom Spirals
2021	Best Acoustic	Lizzie Reid	Christy; Constant Follower; Lizabett Russo
2021	Best Newcomer	Bee Asha	AiiTee; Chef; Danny Cliff
2021	Best Rock/Alternative	Dictator	MEMES; Spyres; Swim School
2021	Best Electronic	AISHA	Barry Can't Swim; KAVARI; Macka
2021	Best Metal	DVNE	Frontierer; Godeater; Hellripper
2021	Best Hip-Hop	K4cie	Bemz; Chef; Clarissa Woods
2022	Best Acoustic	Linzi Clark	Becky Sikasa; Fairweather Friends; Lewis McLaughlin
2022	Best Electronic	Kintra	Grim Lusk; J Wax; Sonia Killmann
2022	Best Hip Hop	Becca Starr	Psweatpants; Sean Focus; Tzusan
2022	Best Live Act	Hannah Laing	AiiTee; Kaputt; Tom McGuire & the Brassholes
2022	Best Metal	Catalysis	Ashenspire; Godeater; Party Cannon
2022	Best Newcomer	Pocket Monica	Lonely Carp; P Caso; Sinathi
2022	Best Rock/Alternative	Gallus	Brooke Combe; Dutch Wine; Uninvited
2023	Best Acoustic	Alice Fay	Ciar Nixon; Dot Allison; Hank Tree
2023	Best Electronic	Casual Worker	Chong; Isa Gordon; Kami-O
2023	Best Hip Hop	JusHarry	Queen of Harps; Supermann on da Beat; Triple01s
2023	Best Live Act	VLURE	An Dannsa Dub; corto.alto; Kairogen
2023	Best Metal	Sixth Wonder	Coffin Mulch; Hellripper; To Kill Achilles
2023	Best Newcomer	Majesty Palm	GIRLS.SPEAK.FRENCH; The Joy Hotel; Yxng STUNNA
2023	Best Rock/Alternative	Bottle Rockets	Humour; The Big Day; Tina Sandwich
2024	Best Acoustic	Theo Bleak	Grayling; Hector Shaw; Mohan Evans
2024	Best Electronic	Tony Morris	Alliyah Enyo; Franck; naafi
2024	Best Hip Hop	Psweatpants	Eyve; P Caso; Vagrant Real Estate
2024	Best Live Act	SLIX	Becky Sikasa; Leahgte; Psweatpants
2024	Best Metal	Dvne	Newshapes; North Atlas; Party Cannon
2024	Best Newcomer	EUGENE	Dara Dubh; Lacuna; Leif Coffield
2024	Best Rock/Alternative	Brògeal	Indoor Foxes; Sister Madds; SOAPBOX
