= Death Mask (disambiguation) =

Death mask is a likeness (typically in wax or plaster cast) of a person's face after their death.

Death Mask may also refer to:

- Death Mask (album), 2025 album by Death in Vegas
- Death Mask (Rome), an episode
- Deathmask, the title of Angel Devoid: Face of the Enemy for platforms including Sega Saturn and PlayStation
- Death Mask (video game), a 1994 Amiga game
- Death Masks, 2003 novel by Jim Butcher

== See also ==
- Cancer Deathmask, a character in Saint Seiya
