= Trans-Love Energies (album) =

Studio album by Death in Vegas
- Released: 26 September 2011
- Recorded: Metrosonic Studios, New York City
- Genre: Electronica
- Length: 54:09 (Standard Edition); 108:11 (Deluxe Edition)
- Label: Portobello
- Producer: Richard Fearless

Death in Vegas chronology
Satan's Circus (2004)	Trans-Love Energies (2011)	Transmission (2016)

Trans-Love Energies is the fifth album by British electronica band Death in Vegas. It was released on 26 September 2011 in the United Kingdom via Portobello Records. The track "Your Loft My Acid", featuring guest vocals by Katie Stelmanis, was released as a digital-only single on 18 September 2011. This was the band's first album in seven years, after Satan's Circus in 2004.

== Track listing ==
No.	Title	Writer(s)	Length
1.	"Silver Time Machine"	Richard Fearless	5:09
2.	"Black Hole"	Fearless	4:54
3.	"Your Loft My Acid"	Fearless, Katie Stelmanis	7:31
4.	"Medication"	Fearless	5:06
5.	"Coum"	Fearless	4:41
6.	"Witchdance"	Fearless, Stelmanis	4:42
7.	"Scissors"	Fearless	4:50
8.	"Drone Reich"	Fearless	4:26
9.	"Lightning Bolt"	Fearless	5:57
10.	"Savage Love"	Fearless	6:58

Deluxe Edition bonus tracks
No.	Title	Writer(s)	Length
11.	"Your Loft My Acid" (Fearless' Trans-House Mix)	Fearless, Stelmanis	5:06
12.	"Medication" (Fearless' Nightcrawler Mix)	Fearless	7:00
13.	"I.W.Y.L.A"	Fearless	3:56
14.	"Fur 74"	Fearless	5:47
15.	"Heroes"	Fearless	5:17
16.	"Coum" (Instrumental)	Fearless	4:46
17.	"Lightning Bolt" (Instrumental)	Fearless	6:01
18.	"Come Ride With Me"	Fearless	4:26
19.	"Enforced Peace" (Fearless' Michigan Militia Mix)	Fearless	5:05
20.	"Moe Tucker"	Fearless	6:46

== Singles ==
- "Your Loft My Acid" (digital only, 18 September 2011)

Professional ratings
Aggregate scores
Source	Rating
Metacritic	72/100
Review scores
Source	Rating
BBC Music	(positive)
Clash	(7/10)
Drowned in Sound	(8/10)
The Independent	2/5 stars
musicOMH	4/5 stars
NME	(7/10)
The Quietus	(average)
Resident Advisor	4.5/5 stars
Slant	3.5/5 stars
Uncut	3/5 stars

== Personnel ==
- Richard Fearless – production, vocals (tracks 1, 4, 5, 7, 9, 10), synthesizer (tracks 1, 4, 5, 8, 9), guitar (track 2), drum programming (tracks 6, 9), keyboards (tracks 3, 6), photography
- James Greenwood – programming, synthesizers (tracks 1, 3–5, 8, 9), drum programming (tracks 6, 9), keyboards (tracks 3, 6)
- Katie Stelmanis – vocals (track 3, 6)
- Travis Caine – vocals & guitar (track 10)
- Bill Skibbe – mixing (tracks 1, 3–10), synthesizers (tracks 5 and 8)
- Ian Button – guitar (tracks 2, 9, 10)
- M. Sord – drums (tracks 2, 4, 5, 9)
- Shahzad Ismaily – bouzouki & banjo (track 1), percussion (track 2), bass (tracks 2, 9)
- Morgan Wiley – synthesizers (track 1), keyboards (track 10)
- Tim Fairplay – Roland TR-808 synthesizers (tracks 3–7)
- Brent Arnold – cello (track 1)
- Terry Miles – keyboards (track 10)
- Doug Marvin – drums (track 10)
- FearlessBeaven – design

Additional credits for the Deluxe Edition

- Richard Fearless – production, vocals (tracks 12, 15, 18–20), synthesizer (tracks 12–20), guitar (track 2), drum programming (tracks 13, 17, 18), keyboards (tracks 3, 6), photography
- James Greenwood – programming, synthesizers (tracks 12, 20), drum programming (tracks 13, 17), keyboards (track 1)
- Katie Stelmanis – vocals (track 11, 18)
- Angela Boyle – vocals (track 19)
- Travis Caine – guitar (track 17), bass (track 15)
- Bill Skibbe – mixing (tracks 15, 20), synthesizers (track 16), guitar & piano (track 20)
- Finn Eiles – mixing (tracks 11, 12, 15, 20)
- Steve Dub – mixing (tracks 13, 14)
- Ian Button – guitar (track 17)
- M. Sord – drums (tracks 16, 17, 20)
- Shahzad Ismaily – bouzouki & banjo (track 15), percussion (track 2), bass (tracks 17)
- Morgan Wiley – synthesizers (track 15)
- Tim Fairplay – Roland TR-808 synthesizers (tracks 11, 12, 16, 20)
- Brent Arnold – cello (track 15)
- Jessica Ruffins – bass (track 20)
