= Heart-Shaped Scars =

Studio album by Dot Allison
- Released: 30 July 2021
- Studios: Castlesound (Pencaitland); Spitfire Audio (London); The Shed (Edinburgh)
- Length: 50:15
- Label: SA
- Producers: Dot Allison; Fiona Cruickshank

Dot Allison chronology
Room 7½ (2009)	Heart-Shaped Scars (2021)	Consciousology (2023)

Singles from Heart-Shaped Scars
- 1. "Ghost Orchid" / "Love Died in Our Arms" Released: 2022

Heart-Shaped Scars is a studio album by Scottish singer Dot Allison. It was released on 30 July 2021 through SA Recordings. It received generally favorable reviews from critics.

== Background ==
Previously, Dot Allison released Afterglow (1999), We Are Science (2002), Exaltation of Larks (2007), and Room 7½ (2009). After getting married in 2011, she moved back from London to her home city of Edinburgh in 2015 to raise her family. Heart-Shaped Scars is her first studio album in 12 years.

== Release ==
The album, produced by Allison and Fiona Cruickshank, was released on 30 July 2021 through SA Recordings. Lyric videos were released for "The Haunted", "Constellations", "Can You Hear Nature Sing?", and "Long Exposure". A music video was released for "One Love".

Allison later released The Entangled Remix EP (2022), which contains remixes of tracks from Heart-Shaped Scars by Lee "Scratch" Perry, Anton Newcombe, Saint Etienne, The Anchoress, and Lomond Campbell.

== Critical reception ==
Professional ratings
Aggregate scores
Source	Rating
Metacritic	77/100
Review scores
Source	Rating
AllMusic	4.5/5 stars
The Arts Desk	5/5 stars
Loud and Quiet	8/10
Mojo	4/5 stars
Pitchfork	6.9/10
PopMatters	7/10
Record Collector	2/5 stars
The Sydney Morning Herald	4/5 stars
Uncut	6/10

According to the review aggregator Metacritic, Heart-Shaped Scars received "generally favorable reviews" based on a weighted average score of 77 out of 100 from 5 critic scores.

Peter Piatkowski of PopMatters described the album as "a lovely, intimate collection of beautiful songs that has the singer set aside her trip-hop and dance sounds for an ethereal folk musical direction." He added, "There's heartache, pain, and longing in the songs, but there's also an inspired inspiration from that pain resulting in some very touching and beautiful music." Joe Muggs of The Arts Desk stated, "Where previously her records sounded like explorations of styles, ... this feels 100% like she has found her sound." Tim Sendra of AllMusic called it "the most intimate and sincere-sounding album she's made yet." Ben Cardew of Pitchfork wrote, "It is an album of quiet delights, but at times it feels like the songs are simply stretched too thin: three-star meals served with five-star service."

=== Accolades ===
Year-end lists for Heart-Shaped Scars
Publication	List	Rank	Ref.
AllMusic	Favorite Singer/Songwriter Albums	—	

== Track listing ==
All tracks are written by Dot Allison, except where noted.

Heart-Shaped Scars track listing
No.	Title	Lyrics	Music	Length
1.	"Long Exposure"			5:50
2.	"The Haunted"		Allison; Amy Bowman	6:20
3.	"Constellations"		Allison; Bowman; Sarah Campbell	4:32
4.	"Can You Hear Nature Sing?"	Allison; Zoë Bestel	Allison; Bestel	4:18
5.	"Ghost Orchid"		Allison; Homay Schmitz	4:30
6.	"Entanglement"			0:42
7.	"Forever's Not Much Time"			4:06
8.	"Cue the Tears"		Allison; Schmitz	4:02
9.	"One Love"			5:48
10.	"Love Died in Our Arms"		Allison; Schmitz	4:46
11.	"Goodbye"			5:23
Total length:				50:15

== Personnel ==
Credits adapted from liner notes.

- Dot Allison – vocals, piano (1, 2, 6, 7, 9–11), vocal arrangement (1, 3, 5, 7, 9–11), ukulele (1, 7, 9, 11), treated keys (2), harmonium (2, 5, 7, 10), Mellotron (3, 8–10), keyboards (3, 8, 10), Hubble kalimba (3, 8, 10), phone-home xylophone (3, 8, 10), backing piano (5), shruti box (8), harmonica (8), glockenspiel (8), 12-string guitar (9), percussion (10), mini dulcimer (10), Folktek Resonant Garden (10), production, field recordings
- Hannah Peel – string conducting (1, 7, 9, 11), string arrangement (1, 7, 9, 11)
- Seonaid Aitkin – violin (1, 7, 9, 11)
- Patsy Reid – violin (1, 7, 9, 11)
- Jane Atkins – viola (1, 7, 9, 11)
- Su-A Lee – cello (1, 7, 9, 11), string fixing
- May Halyburton – double bass (1, 7, 9, 11), bass guitar (3, 4, 5, 8, 10)
- Amy Bowman – ukulele (2), vocals (2, 3), vocal arrangement (3)
- Sarah McWhinney – cello (2, 3, 8)
- Anna Phoebe – violin (2)
- Sarah Campbell – vocals (3), piano (3), vocal arrangement (3)
- Lucy Wilkins – violin (3, 4), string arrangement (3, 4)
- Jenn Butterworth – guitar (3, 8, 10)
- Lauren Macdonald – drums (3, 8, 10)
- Zoë Bestel – vocals (4), ukulele (4)
- Alice Allen – cello (5, 10)
- Jenn Butterworth – guitar (5, 8)
- Homay Schmitz – piano (5, 8), mellotron (10), keyboards (10), programming (10), additional recording, additional engineering
- Fiona Cruickshank – production, engineering, mixing
- Stuart Hamilton – additional recording, additional engineering
- Heba Kadry – mastering
- Michelle Henning – artwork, design
- Essy Syed – portrait photography
