= Why Bother? =

Why Bother? may refer to:

- "Why Bother?" (essay), 1996 essay by American novelist Jonathan Franzen
- "Why Bother?" (song), 1996 song from Weezer's album Pinkerton
- Why Bother? (radio show), 1994 radio show album by Chris Morris and Peter Cook
- Why Bother? (album), 2007 album from the Detroit band ADULT
