= Consciousology =

Studio album by Dot Allison
- Released: 28 July 2023
- Studios: Castlesound (Edinburgh, Scotland); Air (London, England)
- Length: 41:26
- Label: Sonic Cathedral
- Producers: Dot Allison; Fiona Cruickshank

Dot Allison chronology
Heart-Shaped Scars (2021)	Consciousology (2023)

Consciousology is a studio album by Scottish singer Dot Allison. It was released on 28 July 2023 through Sonic Cathedral. It received universal acclaim from critics.

== Background ==
Dot Allison is a Scottish singer. Consciousology is her first solo studio album since Heart-Shaped Scars (2021). It features the London Contemporary Orchestra on strings. Music videos were released for the tracks "Unchanged" and "Double Rainbow". The album was released on 28 July 2023 through Sonic Cathedral.

Allison later released Subconsciousology on 25 July 2025 through Sonic Cathedral. It contains remixes of Consciousology's nine tracks by Lomond Campbell.

== Critical reception ==
Professional ratings
Aggregate scores
Source	Rating
Metacritic	84/100
Review scores
Source	Rating
AllMusic	4/5 stars
Clash	8/10
Record Collector	4/5 stars
Spectrum Culture	76%

According to the review aggregator Metacritic, Consciousology received "universal acclaim" based on a weighted average score of 84 out of 100 from 4 critic scores.

Tim Sendra of AllMusic described the album as "the work of an artist who has tapped into something mystical and true, much like she did with Heart-Shaped Scars." He added, "Allison has made a record that stands not only with her best work but with that of experimental and inspired singer/songwriters of any era." Robin Murray of Clash wrote, "An album of subtle transformation, there's much to cherish here." Kevin Harley of Record Collector called it "a beguilingly inquisitive album, its meanings and methods nurtured into rich, sun-blushed blooms."

=== Accolades ===
Year-end lists for Consciousology
Publication	List	Rank	Ref.
AllMusic	Favorite Singer/Songwriter Albums	—	
Uncut	Top 75 Albums of 2023	65	

== Track listing ==
All tracks are written by Dot Allison, except where noted.

Consciousology track listing
No.	Title	Writer(s)	Length
1.	"Shyness of Crowns"	Allison; Homay Schmitz	4:24
2.	"Unchanged"		5:03
3.	"Bleached by the Sun"	Allison; Zoë Bestel	5:32
4.	"Moon Flowers"		4:50
5.	"220Hz"		2:23
6.	"Double Rainbow"		6:14
7.	"Milk and Honey"		3:46
8.	"Mother Tree"		5:08
9.	"Weeping Roses"		4:06
Total length:			41:26

== Personnel ==
Credits adapted from liner notes.

- Dot Allison – vocals, string arrangement (1), keyboards (1, 2, 5), piano (1, 4, 7, 9), ukulele (1, 6–8), percussion (2), harmonica (2), guitalele (2, 4, 8), harmonium (2, 6, 8), glockenspiel (4), programming (5), PlantWave (6), guitar (6), additional percussion (6), synthesizer (6, 8), treated keys (9), production
- Fiona Cruickshank – production (1–5, 7–9), additional production (6), engineering, mixing
- Homay Schmitz – additional programming (1), keyboards (1), string arrangement (1)
- London Contemporary Orchestra – strings (1, 3, 5)
- Hannah Peel – string conducting (1, 3, 4, 7), string arrangement (1, 3, 4, 7)
- Sam Wilson – percussion (1, 3–6)
- Andy Bell – guitar (2, 6)
- Duncan Lyall – bass guitar (2, 6, 8)
- Dorit Chrysler – theremin (2, 8)
- Lauren MacDonald – drums (2, 8, 9)
- Zoë Bestel – vocals (3), ukulele (3)
- Scottish string section – strings (4, 7)
- Edward Farmer – string conducting (5)
- Talia Morey – orchestration (5)
- Brachyglottis Sunshine – plant vocals (6)
- Amy Bowman – backing vocals (6, 7)
- Anna Phoebe – violin (6, 8)
- Jenn Butterworth – guitar (9)
- Stuart Hamilton – additional engineering, programming
- Heba Kadry – mastering
- Maria Mochnacz – art, design
- Marc Jones – layout, graphic design

== Charts ==
Chart performance for Consciousology
Chart (2023)	Peak position
Scottish Albums (Official Charts)	15
UK Album Downloads (Official Charts)	54
UK Independent Albums (Official Charts)	16
