= Why Bother? (album) =

Studio album by ADULT.
- Released: March 20, 2007
- Genre: Electronic, Detroit techno
- Label: Thrill Jockey

ADULT. chronology
Gimmie Trouble (2005)	Why Bother? (2007)	The Way Things Fall (2013)

Professional ratings
Review scores
Source	Rating
AllMusic	link
Aversion	link
Hot Press	6/10 link
New Musical Express	5/10 link
Pitchfork	6.9/10

Why Bother? is the third studio album from the Detroit band ADULT. All tracks are written and produced by Adam Lee Miller and Nicola Kuperus. Sam Consiglio, a contributor to the band's previous album, Gimmie Trouble, did not return to record this album for undisclosed reasons.

== Track listing ==
1. "Red Herring"
2. "The Mythology of Psychosis"
3. "Good Deeds"
4. "I Feel Worse When I'm With You"
5. "The Importance of Being Folk Part I"
6. "Inclined to Vomit"
7. "You Don't Worry Enough"
8. "Cultivation"
9. "Herd Me"
10. "R.S.x"
11. "Plagued by Fear"
12. "I Should Care"
13. "The Importance of Being Folk Part II"
14. "Harvest"
