= Incommunicado =

Incommunicado, from the Spanish incomunicado, means "cut off from contact", "impossible to reach".

It may also refer to:

- Incommunicado, an album by Alex Smoke
- "Incommunicado" (song), a 1987 single by Marillion
- "Incommunicado" (Slow Horses), a 2025 television episode
- Solitary confinement, one of the ways in which a person can be held incommunicado
- Incommunicado detention, see enforced disappearance
