= Death Mask (album) =

Studio album by Death in Vegas
- Released: 6 June 2025
- Genre: Techno
- Length: 64:55
- Label: Drone

Death in Vegas chronology
Transmission (2016)	Death Mask (2025)

Singles from Death Mask
- 1. "While My Machines Gently Weep" Released: March 2025; 2. "Death Mask" Released: 1 April 2025

Death Mask is the seventh studio album by English group Death in Vegas, led by rock musician Richard Fearless. It was released on 6 June 2025, via Drone Records.

== Background ==
The first release by the group in nine years since Transmission in 2016, Death Mask was noted as consisting of techno songs, including "Hazel" of 145 bpm. It is described as a reflection of moments that occurred between Transmission and Death Mask. The first single of the album, "While My Machines Gently Weep", was released in March 2025. It was followed by the title track and second single, "Death Mask", on 1 April 2025. Fearless noted the influences of the album as including Population One, Panasonic, and Tm404.

== Reception ==
Professional ratings
Aggregate scores
Source	Rating
Metacritic	78/100
Review scores
Source	Rating
AllMusic	4/5 stars
Mojo	3/5 stars
MusicOMH	4.5/5 stars
Uncut	8/10 stars

According to the review aggregator Metacritic, Death Mask received "generally favorable reviews" based on a weighted average score of 78 out of 100 from five critic scores.

Writing for the Quietus, Jeremy Allen remarked, "On Death Mask, Fearless lifts the lid on what lies beneath and exposes his true self in ways that he's always been reluctant to entertain. Fearless honesty suits him." Louder Than War described the album as "an album about transition, about the black tides and inky currents we are swept away on, along with everything else, that ever was, and will be."

MusicOMH assigned a rating of four and a half stars to the album, referring to it as "an intoxicating mix, adding another striking feather to the bow of Richard Fearless." Paul Simpson of AllMusic stated in his review that Death Mask "sounds closer in spirit to those two records than anything previously released under the name Death in Vegas, melding noise, drone, and industrial influences with the type of pure, unrelenting warehouse techno associated with Birmingham and Berlin."

Piers Martin of Uncut gave the album a rating of eight out of ten, calling it "a surprisingly moving reflection on the big issues — family, death and companionship — as he processes his feelings through caustic noise and deep-flanged techno, skillfully drawing out enchanting, almost sculptural passages of serene beauty." Chris Catchpole of Mojo assigned it a three-star rating, remarking "Death Mask makes for a visceral, at times abrasive listen, and much like Fearless's Deep/Future Rave Memory projects, it often emulates the creaks and groans of his floating former shipping container studio, clanging and booming against a claustrophobic, industrial throb."

== Track listing ==
Death Mask track listing
No.	Title	Length
1.	"Chingola"	5:03
2.	"Lovers"	5:12
3.	"While My Machines Gently Weep"	6:58
4.	"Hazel"	7:19
5.	"Roseville"	7:24
6.	"Róisín Dub(h)"	9:09
7.	"Robin's Ghosts"	8:53
8.	"Your Love"	7:40
9.	"Death Mask"	7:17
Total length:		64:55

== Charts ==
Chart performance for Death Mask
Chart (2025)	Peak position
UK Albums Sales (OCC)	84
UK Dance Albums (OCC)	1
UK Independent Albums (OCC)	31
