= Tony Haygarth =

English television, film and theatre actor (1945–2017)

- Tony Haygarth
- Born: George Anthony Haygarth; 4 February 1945; Liverpool, Lancashire, England
- Died: 10 March 2017 (aged 72); Royal Tunbridge Wells, Kent, England
- Occupation: Actor
- Years active: 1971–2013
- Spouse: Carole Winter (m. 1985; div. 2013)
- Children: 2

George Anthony Haygarth (4 February 1945 – 10 March 2017) was an English television, film and theatre actor.

== Life and career ==
After leaving Marlborough College, Liverpool, Haygarth worked unsuccessfully in 1963 as a lifeguard in Torquay, and also tried escapology, equally unsuccessfully. Other jobs included psychiatric nursing and he was an amateur actor before turning professional and appearing in repertory theatre, followed by the Royal Shakespeare Company and the National Theatre.

Haygarth played a milkman in Whatever Happened to the Likely Lads? and made his film debut in the comedy film Percy (1971), subsequently playing many roles in police and historical dramas, as well as situation comedies. He was normally cast as a solid, reliable character with a down-to-earth attitude. From 1977 to 1981 he played PC Wilmot in Roy Clarke's series Rosie. He played Milo Renfield in Dracula (1979) opposite Frank Langella, Donald Pleasence and Laurence Olivier.

Haygarth played the title role in Kinvig (1981), a science-fiction comedy series produced by London Weekend Television. He appeared in Boys from the Blackstuff (1982) as a docker, and in Shoestring, series 1 episode 1. He played swindling but loveable Sanchez in Farrington of the F.O. (1986–87), and in 2005 appeared in the television adaptation of Under the Greenwood Tree. He played leading character Vic Snow in the ITV series Where the Heart Is from 1997 to 2002.

Haygarth's work in theatre included The Tempest and Twelve Angry Men in 1996, both of which brought nominations for Laurence Olivier Theatre Awards for Best Actor in a Supporting Role; he was also the author of several plays. He won the Clarence Derwent Award for Simpatico (1995). His first play, The Lie, dealt with the death of Shakespeare's rival Christopher Marlowe. In 1995 he appeared in Our Friends In The North as Roy Johnson, a police officer attempting to uncover police corruption. He also appeared in Inspector Morse ("Daughters of Cain") as Ted Brooks, as well as two episodes of Sharpe (Sharpe’s Enemy and Sharpe's Justice). His films included Chicken Run and Fakers. In 2008 he played Alfred Doolittle in The Old Vic's production of Pygmalion. In November 2008 he joined the cast of Emmerdale as Mick Naylor. In 2010 he appeared in the London production of Little Voice, as Mr Boo. He appeared in the role of Peter Cooper in an episode of New Tricks (BBC One) (Series 8: 10 – Tiger Tiger) first shown 5 September 2011.

== Other interests ==
Haygarth was also a scholar of Shakespeare's Dark Lady, an unidentified character in the Sonnets. He analysed a Nicholas Hilliard portrait, Mistress Holland, concluding that it was in fact of Emilia Lanier, a candidate for the identity of The Dark Lady. His play Dark Meaning Mouse features Emilia, Shakespeare and Simon Forman.

== Death and family ==
Haygarth died from the complications of Alzheimer's disease on 10 March 2017 at his home in Royal Tunbridge Wells, Kent. At the time of his death, he was divorced from Carole Winter with whom he had two daughters.

== Selected filmography ==
- Percy (1971) – Purdey
- Unman, Wittering and Zigo (1971) – Cary Farthingale
- The Love Ban (1973) – Policeman #2
- Last of the Summer Wine (1973) – Chip Simmonite
- The Ghosts of Motley Hall (1976) – Ronald
- I, Claudius (1976, TV mini-series) – Claudius' Slave
- Rachel and the Beelzebub Bombardiers (1977) – Reformed drunkard
- Holocaust (1978, TV mini-series) – Heinz Muller
- Let's Get Laid (1978) – Sgt. Costello
- Dracula (1979) – Milo Renfield
- S.O.S. Titanic (1979, TV movie) – Engineer Officer (uncredited)
- The Human Factor (1979) – Buffy
- McVicar (1980) – Rabies Pendel
- Outside In (1981)
- Ivanhoe (1982, TV movie) – Friar Tuck
- Two Gentlemen of Verona (1983, TV movie) – Launce
- Britannia Hospital (1982) – Fraser: The Workers
- A Private Function (1984) – Sutcliff
- The Bride (1985) – Tavern Keeper
- Dreamchild (1985) – Mad Hatter (voice)
- Clockwise (1986) – Ivan with the Tractor
- A Month in the Country (1987) – Douthwaite
- Hardwicke House (1987 TV series originally cancelled after first two episodes aired; remaining five uploaded to YouTube in 2019) – Mr Savage
- T Bag Bounces Back (1987) - Major Happy
- The Most Dangerous Man in the World (1988) – Yildirim
- The Dressmaker (1988) – Mr. Manders
- Bergerac (1988) – Chester Ackerman
- Tree of Hands (1989) – Kostas
- London Kills Me (1991) – Burns
- Between the Lines (1992) – Colin Keogh
- The Trial (1993) – Willem
- Prince of Jutland (1994) – Ragnar
- Sharpe (TV Series) (1994) – Pot Au Feu
- Our Friends In The North (1996) – Roy Johnson
- Swept from the Sea (1997) – Mr. Smith
- Where the Heart is (1997–2002) – Vic Snow
- The Woodlanders (1997) – Mr. Melbury
- Chicken Run (2000) – Mr. Tweedy (voice)
- Midsomer Murders ("Destroying Angel") (2001) – Tyson
- Fakers (2004) – Phil Norris
- Ghostboat (2006, TV movie) – Cassidy
- Midsomer Murders ("King’s Crystal") (2007) – Jack Tewson
- Wild at Heart ("Series 2 Episode 5") (2007) – Bash
- New Tricks ("Tiger Tiger") (2011) – Peter Cooper
- Midsomer Murders ("A Rare Bird") (2012) – George Napier
- Inspector George Gently ("The Lost Child") (2013) – Peter Bacchus
