= Fakers =

- Directed by: Richard Janes
- Written by: Paul Gerstenberger
- Produced by: Richard Janes; Claire Bee; Todd Kleparski
- Starring: Matthew Rhys; Kate Ashfield; Tom Chambers; Tony Haygarth; Art Malik; Jonathan Cecil
- Music by: Kevin Sargent
- Release date: 2004
- Running time: 89 minutes
- Country: United Kingdom
- Language: English

Fakers is a 2004 British crime film directed by Richard Janes and starring Matthew Rhys as con-man with a big debt to pay off to wanna-be crime lord played by Art Malik. It was produced by Richard Janes, Claire Bee and Todd Kleparski, with independent funding and costing $1,500,000 to make.

The film was released in United Kingdom in November 2004.

== Plot ==
Set in the eccentric London art world, the film's protagonist Nick Edwards (Rhys) owes £50,000 to the smooth and brutal crime lord Foster Wright (Malik) and has four days to find the cash. Nick knows nothing about working a heist of that size, but when he stumbles across a lost sketch by the legendary Italian artist Antonio Fraccini, he hatches a plan with the help of cynical Eve (Ashfield) and her extremely talented yet naïve artist brother Tony (Chambers): to forge the drawing and sell it to five Mayfair galleries within an hour before anyone catches onto the scam.

== Cast ==
- Matthew Rhys as Nick Edwards
- Kate Ashfield as Eve Evans
- Tom Chambers as Tony Evans
- Tony Haygarth as Phil Norris
- Art Malik as Foster Wright
- Emilio Muñoz as Lead Henchman
- Rula Lenska as Sylvia Creat
- Jordi Llinas as Henchman
- Ignasi Claret as Henchman
- Edward Hibbert as Gordon Fisher
- Paul Clayton as Henry Price
- Judith Perez as Baker's Daughter
- Larry Lamb as Harvey Steed
- Jonathan Cecil as Dr. Fielding
- Oliver Wilson as Mickey's Gorilla
- Lee Tuson as Mickey's Gorilla
- Maz Stylianou as Mickey's Gorilla
- David Henry as Mickey's Solicitor

== Soundtrack ==
The title track was written and performed by Andrea Britton and produced by Andrew J Jones.
