= Revolver (British band) =

London-based alternative rock and shoegaze band

- Origin: London, England
- Genres: Alternative rock, shoegazing
- Years active: 1990–1994
- Label: Hut
- Past members: Mat Flint (guitar/vocals); Hamish Brown (bass); Nick Dewey (drums)

Revolver were a London-based guitar band in existence from 1990 until 1994, comprising Mat Flint (guitar/vocals), Hamish Brown (bass) and Nick Dewey (drums). Flint and Dewey had been in school bands together, and when the two moved to London in the autumn of 1990 met Brown who completed the line-up. They reformed in 2025, announcing concerts in Skegness and Nottingham.

The band, after attracting attention from several record labels, including Dedicated Records, One Little Indian, and Creation Records, signed to the Virgin Records subsidiary Hut Records in the summer of 1991. The band quickly picked up a following, supporting the likes of Chapterhouse, Slowdive, Teenage Fanclub and Blur, and gained a lot of press coverage, most notably in NME, Melody Maker and The Face. Their first single, "Heaven Sent An Angel" topped the UK independent charts, as did the follow-up "Crimson", and the third single "Venice". The band specialised in bright, abrasive guitar-pop songs with strong melodies, and were determined (but ultimately failed) to distinguish themselves from the other guitar bands of the era. The UK press lumped them in with the shoegazing movement, a tag with which the band was not comfortable.

A compilation of these first 3 singles was released in the States as "Baby's Angry" on Caroline Records, and gained the band airplay on US college radio. The band toured America in the autumn of 1992, on a co-headlining tour with fellow Caroline Records act Drop Nineteens.

In 1993, Revolver released the single "Cradle Snatch", closely followed by the album Cold Water Flat. Although the songs were more sophisticated than their earlier work, the previous sales failed to repeat; Virgin dropped the band after a final single "I Wear Your Chain" failed to make the top 75. The band recorded an album's worth of demos, but failing to sign a deal with another label split up at the beginning of 1994.

Mat Flint went on to play bass guitar for Death In Vegas from 1996 onwards, and has released a single "Commodity" with his new band Deep Cut in May 2007, on Club AC30 Records.

Nick Dewey played drums for James Dean Bradfield of the Manic Street Preachers during his solo tour of 2006.

== Discography ==
=== Albums ===
- Baby's Angry (1992), Hut — Compilation album featuring tracks from the band's first three EPs.
- Cold Water Flat (1993), Hut

=== Singles, EPs ===
- 45 EP (1991), Hut - UK no. 85
- "Crimson" (1991), Hut - UK no. 88
- "Venice" (1992), Hut - UK no. 101
- "Cradle Snatch" (1993), Hut - UK no. 101
- "I Wear Your Chain" (1993), Hut UK no. 125

=== Music Videos ===
- "Heaven Sent An Angel" (1991)
- "Crimson" (1991)
- "Venice" (1992)
- "Cradle Snatch" (1993)
