= Thrashing Doves =

English rock band

- Origin: London, England
- Genres: Rock
- Years active: 1986–1992
- Labels: A&M; Elektra Records
- Members: Ken Foreman (vocals/guitar); Brian Foreman (keyboards); Ian Button (guitar); Kevin Sargent (percussion)
- Past members: Gail Ann Dorsey (bass); Hari Sajjan (bass)

Thrashing Doves were an English rock band. Their line-up consisted of Ken Foreman (vocals/guitar) with Brian Foreman (keyboards), Ian Button (guitar) and Kevin Sargent (drums). The original bass player was Hari Sajjan. Subsequent bass players were James Eller, Claire Kenny and Gail Ann Dorsey. Dorsey went on to work with David Bowie and released her own album, The Corporate World.

In 1987, Bruce Forest remixed "Jesus on the Payroll" using David Cole on piano. They completed a special "Street Mix" which DJ Paul Oakenfold gives credit for starting the Balearic movement in the late 1980s/early 1990s. The piano lick was sampled for Bocca Juniors.

There is some evidence to suggest that their career was irrevocably harmed when British Prime Minister Margaret Thatcher expressed fondness for their video for "Beautiful Imbalance" when she saw it on Saturday Superstore. This came to be known as The Curse of Thrashing Doves. The group came to some prominence in 1988 as the lead support act on tour for Duran Duran.

They changed their name to The Doves for their third album, not to be confused with the Manchester rock band Doves.

The Foreman brothers and Sargent went on to become writers, producers and composers for media. Button went on to play for Death in Vegas.

== Discography ==
=== Albums ===
- 1987: Bedrock Vice (A&M)
- 1989: Trouble in the Home (A&M)
- 1991: Affinity (as The Doves) (Elektra)

=== Singles ===
- 1986: "Matchstick Flotilla" (A&M)
- 1986: "Biba's Basement" (A&M)
- 1987: "Beautiful Imbalance" (A&M) – UK No. 50
- 1987: "The Grinding Stone (Let Me Climb Your Ladder)" (A&M)
- 1987: "Je$u$ on the Payroll" (A&M) – U.S. Dance No. 20
- 1987: "Northern Civil War Party" (A&M) – remixed by Bruce Forest
- 1988: "Reprobate's Hymn" (A&M)
- 1989: "Angel Visit" (A&M) – U.S. Modern Rock No. 14
- 1989: "Lorelei" (A&M)
- 1989: "Another Deadly Sunset" (A&M)
- 1991: "I Wouldn't Know You from the Rest" (as The Doves) (Elektra)
- 1992: "Beaten Up in Love Again" (as The Doves) (Elektra)

Angie Brown sang lead vocals on "Beaten Up in Love Again"
