= Satan's Circus =

Studio album by Death in Vegas
- Released: 11 October 2004
- Recorded: The Contino Rooms, London, England
- Genres: Electronic; electronic rock
- Length: 63:04
- Label: Drone Records
- Producers: Richard Fearless; Tim Holmes

Death in Vegas chronology
Scorpio Rising (2002)	Satan's Circus (2004)	Milk It: The Best of Death in Vegas (2005)

Singles from Satan's Circus
- 1. "Ein für die Damen" Released: September 13, 2004; 2. "Head" Released: October 4, 2004

Professional ratings
Aggregate scores
Source	Rating
Metacritic	63/100
Review scores
Source	Rating
AllMusic	3/5 stars
The Guardian	1/5 stars
Los Angeles Times	2.5/4 stars
NME	(7/10)
PopMatters	6/10 stars
Uncut	3/5 stars
Under the Radar	6/10 stars
URB	3.5/5 stars
Yahoo! Music UK	6/10 stars

Satan's Circus is the fourth studio album by Death in Vegas, released on 11 October 2004 on Drone Records in the United Kingdom and on 24 May 2005 on Sanctuary Records in the United States. Contrary to previous releases, this album features no guest vocalists. This album is the first release through Death in Vegas's own label, Drone Records. It peaked at #79 on the French Albums Chart.

== Track listing ==
All tracks are written by Richard Fearless and Tim Holmes.

No.	Title	Length
1.	"Ein für die Damen"	5:24
2.	"Zugaga"	7:17
3.	"Heil Xanax"	6:52
4.	"Black Lead"	4:13
5.	"Sons of Rother"	6:06
6.	"Candy McKenzie"	4:13
7.	"Reigen"	7:22
8.	"Kontroll"	5:11
9.	"Anita Berber"	7:39
10.	"Head"	5:32
11.	"Come on Over to Our Side, Softly Softly"	3:15
Total length:		63:04

== Personnel ==
Death in Vegas

- Richard Fearless – production, keyboards, programming
- Tim Holmes – production, keyboards, programming

Additional musicians

- Terry Miles – keyboards
- Ian Button – guitar
- Danny Hammond – guitar (5, 9, 10)
- Mat Flint – bass (3, 9, 10)
- Will Blanchard – drums (1)
- Simon Hanson – drums (10)
- Susan Delane – vocals (3)
