= Le Car (band) =

American electronic musical group

- Origin: Detroit, Michigan
- Genres: Electro; Electronica
- Years active: 1995–1998
- Labels: Ersatz Audio; Monoplaza Records Co.
- Members: Adam Lee Miller; Ian Clarck

Le Car was an American electronic musical group from Detroit, Michigan, comprising Ian Clark and Adam Lee Miller. From 1995 to 1998, Le Car generated club techno and lo-fi electronica. Miller later went on to form ADULT.; Clark formed Perspects.

== Recording history ==
Le Car were featured on the album Electro Juice and five compilation albums released by Austrian electronica label Sabotage alongside fellow recording artists such as Patrick Pulsinger, Def Con, and the Private Lightning Six. Ersatz Audio has also released tracks by Miller and Clark solo projects Artificial Material and Lesseninglesson respectively. Ersatz Audio released the compilation album Auto-Biography in the United States on August 31, 2000. The album garnered favorable reviews from critics. Diana Potts from Allmusic noted of Auto-Biography that the album "embodies precise, simplistic, and creative production, while keeping it comprehensible and simultaneously challenging."

In 2006, Le Car's song "Aluminum Rectangles" was featured on the DJ mix album A Bugged Out Mix by Miss Kittin, which charted at number one-hundred seventy on the French Albums Chart.

== Discography ==
Albums

- Automatic (1997)
- Auto-Biography (2000)

EPs

- Auto-Fuel (1996)
- Auto-Graph (1997)
- Auto-Motif (1998)
- Remixed (2000)
