= Kevin Sargent (composer) =

British composer for film and television

Kevin Sargent is a British composer for film and television who began his career as a drummer, percussionist and keyboardist with cult dance/rock pioneers Thrashing Doves. Signed to A&M and Elektra Records, he learnt his craft at the elbow of legendary producers Chris Thomas, Jimmy Iovine and jazz luminary Tommy Lipuma, recording three critically acclaimed albums in Los Angeles, London and New York and touring the US and Europe. Their funky and controversial "Jesus on the Payroll" (1988) reached the Billboard Top Twenty dance chart.

In 2005 his score to A Waste of Shame; The Mystery of Shakespeare and His Sonnets was nominated for an Ivor Novello Award and was the sole UK nominee for the European Soundtrack Awards. In 2013 he received a BAFTA nomination for his work on series two of The Hour, and nominations for both Best Television Soundtrack and Best Title Music for We'll Take Manhattan in the UK and international Music & Sound Awards.

== Feature films ==
- Crush (2001) (dir John McKay)
- Fakers (2004) (dir Richard Janes)
- The Upside of Anger (2005) (dir Mike Binder)
- Ballet Shoes (2007) (dir Sandra Goldbacher)
- Brave Young Men (2009) (dir Sam Leifer)
- The Last Days of Lehman Brothers (2009) (dir Michael Samuels)
- Joe Maddison's War (2010) (dir Patrick Collerton)
- We'll Take Manhattan (2012) (dir John McKay)

== Short films ==
- Out and About with H P Lovecraft (National Film and Television School)
- Wet and Dry (1997) (dir John McKay)
- Killing Joe (1999) (dir Mehdi Norowzian)

== Television ==
- The Canterbury Tales (BBC, 2004)
  - "The Sea Captain's Tale"
  - "The Miller's Tale"
- Macbeth (BBC, 2005)
- A Waste of Shame: The Mystery of Shakespeare and His Sonnets (BBC, 2005)
- Aftersun (Tiger Aspect Productions, 2006)
- Lilies (BBC, 2006)
  - "The Chit Behind King Billy"
- Saddam's Tribe (World Productions, 2007)
- Blue Murder (ITV Granada, 2007-2009)
- Honest (ITV Granada, 2008)
- The Hour (Series Two) (BBC, 2012)
- "The Wrong Mans" (2014)

== Radio ==
- Cooking for Michael Collins (Watershed Productions)
- Into the Dark (Watershed Productions)

== Theatre ==
- The Confederacy
- The Beau Defeated
- The Good Person of Szechwan

== Commercials ==
Kevin has also forged an enviable reputation in commercials, where his characterful, stylish and eclectic contemporary voice has complimented a host of international and prestigious campaigns including Guinness, Adidas, Cerruti, Peugeot, Financial Times, Eurostar, Dulux, Harrods, Goodyear, Glenfiddich, Hyundai, Ford Galaxy, Land Rover and Patek Philippe. His work for Barclays, featuring Sir Anthony Hopkins and directed by Tony Scott, was rewarded with top honours from both the D&AD and Creative Circle, while Adidas 'Tim Henman', featuring counter-tenor James Bowman, saw him a finalist in the British Television Advertising Awards for Best Original Music.

== Comic theatre ==
As a founder member of acclaimed comedy team The Hurricane Club, Kevin also boasts a parallel background in theatre and comic improvisation, performing off-the-cuff sketches for many years at their weekly West End residency.
