= Richard Janes =

British film director (born 1978)

- Born: Guildford, Surrey, United Kingdom
- Occupation: Entrepreneur, author, motivational speaker
- Spouse: Amy Janes
- Children: 2

Richard Janes (born in Guildford, Surrey) is an Emmy winning Producer and the founder of the Hollywood digital agency Fanology. He started his career advising clients including Larry King, Ashley Tisdale, Jillian Michaels, Steve Blake, Waka Flocka Flame, Laird Hamilton, and Shay Mitchell on how to build their digital brands and grow their fanbase.

Today, Richard spends most of his time on the public speaking circuit telling his story and spreading the message that personal branding isn't just for celebrities but its power can be harnessed by everyone looking to make an impact on the world. His podcast is called The Passion And Purpose Podcast.

== Early life ==
From the age of 11, Janes was brought up spending his summers at The Cannizaro Park Open Air Theatre in Wimbledon, London, where his parents ran the bar as an offshoot from their Wimbledon-based café and catering business. Janes started as a child actor, working on a wide range of television programs such as The Demon Headmaster, Kavanagh QC with John Thaw and Longitude, where he played opposite Jeremy Irons.

Deciding he also wanted to work behind the camera, Janes went back to school studying an intensive two-year degree at Ravensbourne College of Design and Communication, the centre for excellence in professional broadcasting in the UK. Whilst studying and gaining experience in all areas of production, he worked under some of film's top directors, from Terry Gilliam and Tarsem to Sharon Maguire.

As part of his graduation, Janes produced and directed his first film-based short film titled Representative Radio. Based on a radio DJ who receives a phone call from a distressed man on the edge of suicide, the film dealt with cause and effect of media spin. Representative Radio went on to receive a nomination for best student film in the non-factual category of the 2002 Royal Television Society Awards.

After leaving Ravensbourne, Janes was then approached to direct a three-week London run of R. C. Sherriff's classic Journey's End. The play ran at the Courtyard Theatre, with some of the best attendance figures the venue had ever seen. Fakers, a sharp, fast-moving tale of blackmail and forgery set in the upper echelons of the international art society, marks Janes' feature-length directorial debut.

In 2007, he won a Los Angeles-area Emmy for his work as director and co-producer on the documentary series Behind the Lyrics.

In 2008, Janes launched Film industry bloggers an online blogging community of film industry professionals from around the world. The community closed in 2010.

In 2010, Janes launched Fanology, a Hollywood digital agency working with celebrities to build the digital footprint. In 2012 the agency started working with major brands such as Toyota, LifeTime Fitness, Microsoft, P&G, and Tourism Ireland.
