= Adult (band) =

American band

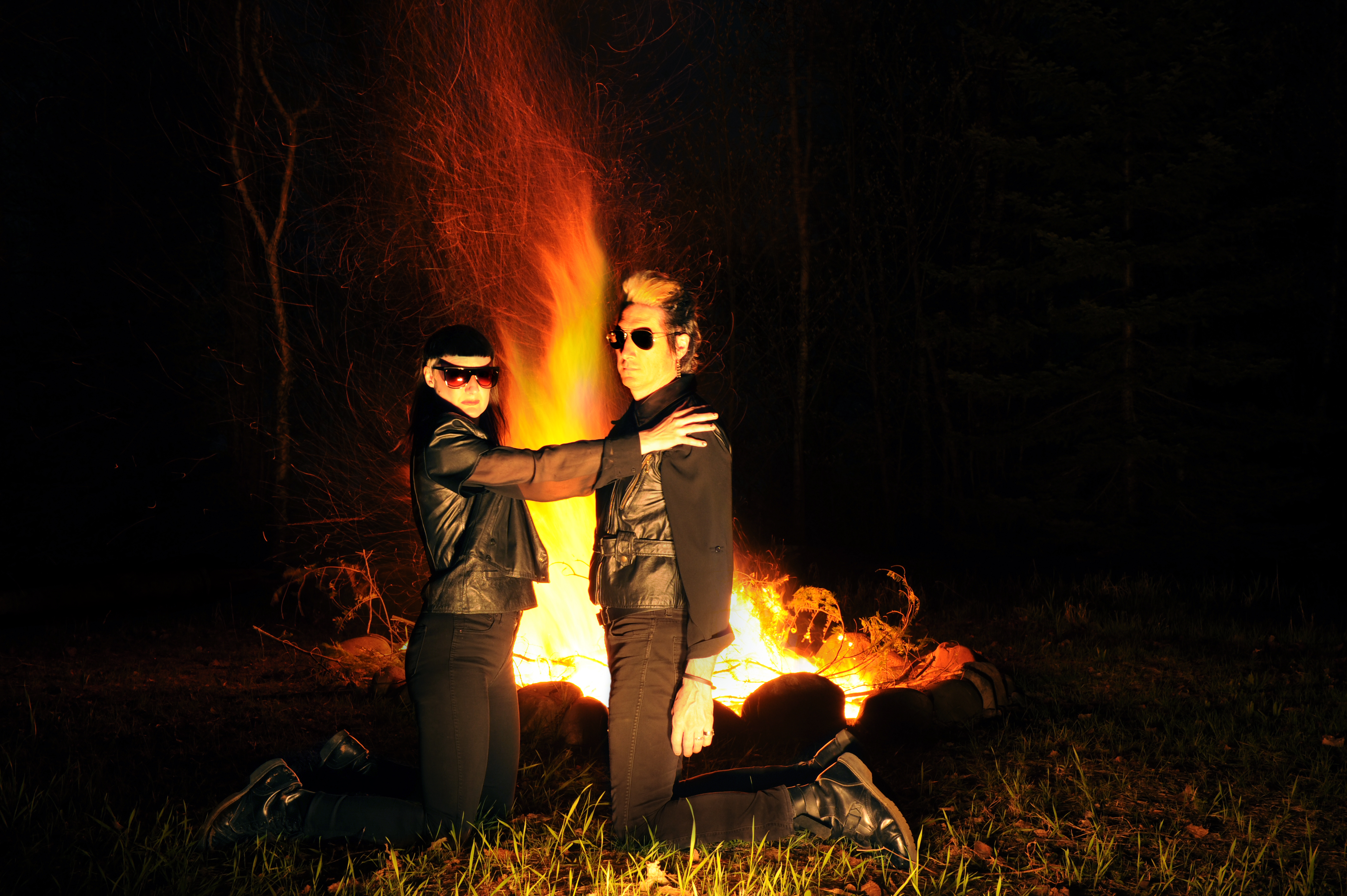
- Adult in 2018

Background information
- Also known as: Plasma Co.
- Origin: Detroit, Michigan, U.S.
- Genres: Electroclash; electropunk; synth-pop; techno
- Years active: 1998–present
- Labels: Dais; Mute Records; Third Man Records; Ersatz Audio; Thrill Jockey; Ghostly International
- Members: Adam Lee Miller; Nicola Kuperus
- Past members: Samuel Consiglio
- Website: adultperiod.com

Adult (stylized as ADULT.) is an American band from Detroit, Michigan, formed in 1998 by married couple Nicola Kuperus and Adam Lee Miller. The band integrates vocals with drum machines, analog synthesizers and electronic/punk elements. Both band members have art degrees. Miller has a painting degree, and Kuperus a photography degree.

== History ==
Before forming Adult, Miller was one half of the band Le Car and released solo material under the name Artificial Material. Adult began releasing albums in 1998 under the pseudonym Plasma Co. Initially, the band members were uncredited and not publicized, but by the time Anxiety Always was released, Adult was listed as husband-and-wife team Adam Lee Miller and Nicola Kuperus. Miller and Kuperus are also the founders of the Ersatz Audio record label. When launching their tour in support of the D.U.M.E. EP, Adult announced that they had become a trio with the addition of guitarist Samuel Consiglio. The trio was short-lived – Consiglio left the band at the start of 2006. While popular in their home city of Detroit, they also enjoy a cult following throughout the rest of the US and are also very popular in Germany and the United Kingdom. They toured with Trans Am in 2002, and in May 2003, the band made its first headlining tour in the United States; gigs across Europe followed soon after. Adult attracted comparisons to bands including OMD and the Flying Lizards.

Adult have remixed other artists, most notably Felix da Housecat, Fischerspooner, Ladytron, A Number of Names, The Faint, Erase Errata and Bis. Kuperus (who is also responsible for Adult's album artwork and photography) has sung on the recordings of other electronic acts including Death in Vegas, Swayzak and Chicks On Speed. Kuperus has also showcased her photography at museums around the United States and Europe. Between 2008 and 2010, Adult produced the film "thee Three Graces tryptic: Decampment, Traditions & Possession(s)", which was only shown with Adult performing the score live. It was screened at Anthology Film Archives (NY), Detroit Institute of Arts (Detroit), Distrital y Cineteca National: Mexico City Film Festival amongst other theaters. In 2010, Adult wrote and recorded the original score to the film OPEN by Jake Yuzna. In 2013, the art museum Mattress Factory in Pittsburgh invited Adult to contribute an installation; the result was called Diptyching which included audio, video, and the re-creation of a life size façade of a house. In conjunction with the piece, Adult released a limited edition 12" Work/Wreck which included the music from the installation.

Adult's eighth studio album, Perception is/as/of Deception, was released in April 2020 on Dais.

== Discography ==
=== Albums ===
- 2001 Resuscitation – Ersatz Audio
- 2003 Anxiety Always – Ersatz Audio
- 2005 Gimmie Trouble – Thrill Jockey
- 2007 Why Bother? – Thrill Jockey
- 2012 Resuscitation (Vinyl reissue) – Ghostly International
- 2013 The Way Things Fall – Ghostly International
- 2017 Live at Third Man – Third Man Records
- 2017 Detroit House Guests – Mute
- 2018 This Behavior – Dais
- 2020 Perception is/as/of Deception – Dais
- 2022 Becoming Undone – Dais
- 2026 Kissing Luck Goodbye – Dais

=== Singles and EPs ===
- 1998 Modern Romantics 12" (as Plasma Co.) – Electrecord
- 1998 Dispassionate Furniture 12" – Ersatz Audio
- 1999 Entertainment 12" – Ersatz Audio
- 2000 New-Phonies 12" – Clone Records
- 2000 Nausea 12" – Ersatz Audio
- 2001 Hand To Phone 12" – Clone Records
- 2002 Misinterpreted 12" – Ersatz Audio
- 2002 Limited Edition 7" – Ersatz Audio
- 2002 Hand To Phone Remixed 12" – Clone Records
- 2003 Controlled Edition 7" – Ersatz Audio
- 2004 T & A. 7" – Ersatz Audio
- 2004 Split/Split/Split 7" – Ersatz Audio/Cass Records
- 2005 D.U.M.E. 12"/CD – Thrill Jockey
- 2005 Numbers + ADULT. = This Seven Inch 7" – Kill Rock Stars
- 2008 The Decampment Trilogy (3 7"s [limited to 100 copies each] with photographic prints taken by Nicola Kuperus) – Ersatz Audio
- 2008 Let's Feel Bad Together CD-R – Ersatz Audio
- 2012 Shari Vari / 122 Hours of Fear (covers of songs originally by The Screamers and A Number of Names) – Ghostly International
- 2013 Work/Wreck 12" – Ersatz Audio
- 2017 Detroit House Guests: Variations (Digital only) – Mute
- 2017 Detroit House Guests: The Remixes 12" – Mute
- 2019 Subsurface/Coming Apart 7" – Dais

=== Remixes ===
- 1998 D.I.E. "The Man You Never See" – Clone Records
- 1999 Ganymed "Music Takes Me Higher" – Sabotage Communications
- 1999 Ectomorph "The Haunting" – Intuit-Solar
- 1999 Michiko Kusaki "Let's Rock" – Angelika Köhlermann
- 2000 Mat101 "Arcade" – Nature Records
- 2000 Fischerspooner – ("Emerge")
- 2000 Tuxedomoon "No Tears" – Gigolo Records
- 2001 Solvent "Flexidisc" – Suction Records
- 2001 Kitbuilders "Girls on Stage" – Vertical Records
- 2001 K-Rock "Hardedged Industry" – Breakin' Records
- 2001 Solenoid "Narcissistic"- Haio Haio Haio Records
- 2001 G.D.Luxxe "I'm Always Busy" – Interdemsional Transmissions
- 2001 The Faint "Agenda Suicide" – City Slang/Labels
- 2001 Phoenecia "Rhythm Box" – Schematic Music Co.
- 2002 A Number of Names "Shari Vari" – Puzzlebox Records
- 2002 Bobby Conn "Winners" – Thrill Jockey
- 2002 Jackass & Mule "1-2-3 Miami" – xylpohone jones
- 2002 Jolly Music "Radio Jolly" – Illustrious Records / Sony
- 2002 Bis "Robotic" – SpinArt Records
- 2002 Felix da Housecat featuring Miss Kittin – ("Silver Screen Shower Scene") – City Rockers
- 2002 Death in Vegas – ("Hands Around My Throat") – BMG International
- 2003 Erase Errata "Marathon" – TroubleMan Unlimited
- 2004 Electronicat "I Wanna Know Now" – Angelika Köhlermann
- 2008 Ladytron "Runaway" -Nettwerk2008 Tussle "Night of the Hunter" – FrequeNC
- 2009 Trisomie21 "Hear Me Now" – Le Maquis
- 2016 Pet Shop Boys "Shopping" – Moogfest Sampler
- 2016 John Foxx "The Shadow of His Former Self" – Metamatic Records
- 2017 Barry Adamson “One Hot Mess“ – Central Control International
- 2018 LIARS “Staring at Zero (ADULT. ‘Y Can’t U’ Remix)” – Mute

=== Contributing vocals from Nicola Kuperus ===
- 2002 Death in Vegas "Hands Around My Throat" – BMG International
- 2002 Swayzak "I Dance Alone" – Stud!o K7
- 2003 Chicks on Speed "Wordyrappinghood" – ChicksonSpeed Records
- 2009 Tyrell Corporation "Lose the Hero" – Clone Records
