= Dead Elvis =

Studio album by Death in Vegas
- Released: 10 March 1997
- Recorded: Orinoco Studios, Milo Studios
- Length: 65:50
- Label: Concrete
- Producer: Richard Fearless, Steve Hellier

Death in Vegas chronology
Dead Elvis (1997)	The Contino Sessions (1999)

Alternative cover

Dead Elvis is the debut album by British band Death in Vegas. It was released on 10 March 1997 in the United Kingdom and on 16 September 1997 in the United States. This was the only Death in Vegas album to feature original member Steve Hellier. The British release features coloured Elvis graffiti on the cover, while the US version features a tattoo artist. The music video for "Dirt" was a minor hit on MTV's 120 Minutes. "GBH" was featured on the soundtrack for the 1998 American comedy-thriller film Homegrown.

As of July 2013, it was certified silver by British Phonographic Industry for 60,000 sold units in UK.

== Track listing ==
All tracks by Richard Fearless & Steve Hellier

1. "All That Glitters" – 6:34
2. "Opium Shuffle" – 5:02
3. "GBH" – 5:09
4. "Twist and Crawl" (bonus track not featured on all versions) – 4:59
5. "Dirt" – 5:52
6. "Rocco" – 6:34
7. "Rekkit" – 6:27
8. "I Spy" – 4:58
9. "Amber" – 8:07
10. "Rematerialised" – 8:21
11. "68 Balcony" – 5:07
12. "Sly" – 3:33

=== Bonus disc (Dead Elvis Remix Sessions) ===
In France only, initial copies of Dead Elvis came packaged with a 10-track bonus CD, titled Dead Elvis Remix Sessions.

1. "Dirt" (Slayer mix) – 6:33
2. "Rocco" (Dave Clarke mix) – 6:18
3. "Twist and Crawl" (Full mix) – 4:57
4. "Opium Shuffle" (Monkey Mafia mix) – 6:15
5. "City Rub" – 6:22
6. "Dirt" (Old School mix) – 5:29
7. "Rocco" (Dub) – 6:35
8. "Opium Shuffle" (Dead Elvis mix) – 5:14
9. "Claiming Marilyn" – 5:41
10. "Dirt" (Mullet mix) – 6:09

Track 8 is the same as the album version.

== Singles ==
- "Dirt" (29 April 1996)
- "Rocco" (14 October 1996; reissued 13 October 1997)
- "Twist and Crawl" (14 April 1997)
- "Rekkit" (9 June 1997)

== Samples ==
- "Dirt" contains samples from John Morris's announcements at the Woodstock Festival addressing the crowd, as well as from "The 'Fish' Cheer / I-Feel-Like-I'm-Fixin'-to-Die Rag" by Country Joe & the Fish, and "Big Mama" by Roxanne Shante.
- "Rocco" contains a sample from "Moanin' Low" by Claire Trevor, from the film Key Largo (the main antagonist of the film is called Rocco). The sample can be heard explicitly in "Rocco (Dave Clarke mix)".
- "All That Glitters" contains a vocal sample from “Fonky Thang, Diamond' Rang” by The Dells, (Sweet As Funk Can Be LP) 1972.

== Personnel ==
- Richard Fearless
- Steve Hellier – keyboards, programming
- Anthony Anderson – guitar
- Seamus Beaghen – hammond organ, fender rhodes
- Ranking Roger – vocals
- Paul Rutherford – trombone
- Selah – vocals
- Andy Visser – flute, harmonica, saxophone
- Mat Flint – bass
- Nick "Avin' It" Abnett - bass
- Tim Weller – drums
- Steve Dub – engineer
- Luke Gordon – engineer, mixing
- Tim Holmes – engineer, mixing

== Reception ==
Professional ratings
Review scores
Source	Rating
AllMusic	3/5 stars
Almost Cool	(6.5/10)
Ink Blot Magazine	(positive)
NME	7/10
Pitchfork	(6.9/10)
Q	3/5 stars
Rolling Stone	3.5/5 stars

AllMusic called Dirt formulaic for its sampled guitars, but they said tracks that explored other genres were more interesting. In contrast, Pitchfork's reviewer became interested in the album because of Dirt and was frustrated by the songs featuring reggae and ambient influences. They also felt that it became "too trippy" near the end of the album. Rolling Stone described it as an "inventively inclusive" mix of genres and influences that is still original.

== Certifications ==
Region	Certification	Certified units/sales
United Kingdom (BPI)	Silver	60,000^{^}
^{^} Shipments figures based on certification alone.
