= Alex Smoke =

Scottish music producer and DJ

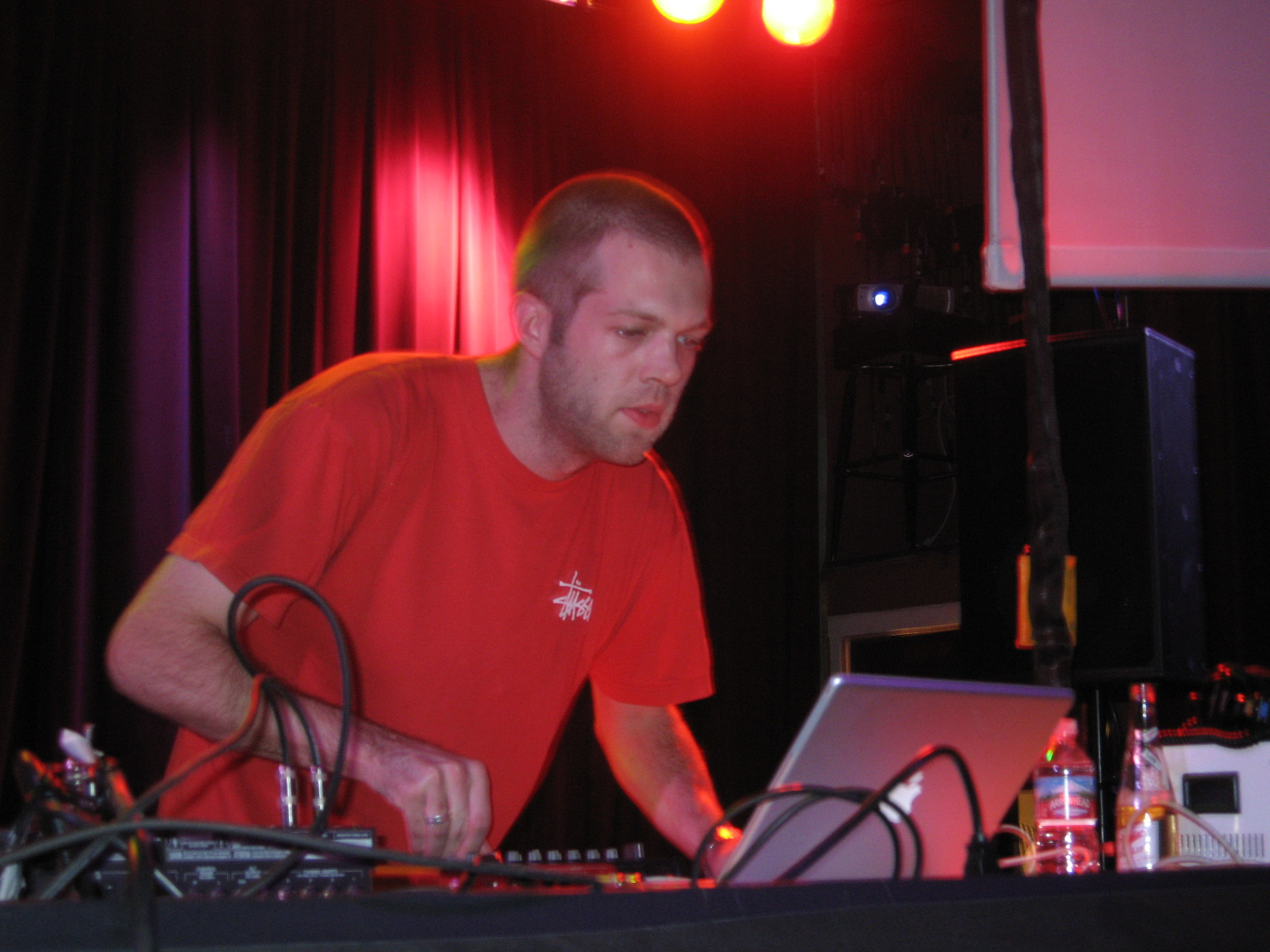

Background information
- Born: Alex Menzies; 28 November 1978 (age 47)
- Origin: Glasgow, Scotland
- Genres: Microhouse, minimal techno, electronica, classical
- Occupation: Producer
- Years active: 2002–present
- Labels: Hum+Haw, Vakant, Soma Quality Recordings
- Website: Official website

Alex Smoke is a Scottish music producer and DJ, from Glasgow but based in London, making techno, electronic and classical music. He has released three studio albums, Incommunicado (2005) and Paradolia (2006) on Soma Records, and Lux (2010) on his own label Hum+Haw. He contributed a track to Cocoon Recordings' Cocoon Compilation F album.

== Discography ==
=== Releases ===
- Incommunicado (2005)
- Paradolia (2006)
- Lux (2010)
- Love Over Will (2016)

=== Singles ===
- "Random As" (2002)
- "Chica Wappa" (2004)
- "Simple Things EP" (2004)
- "Brian's Lung" (2005)
- "Don't See The Point" (2005)
- "Lost in Sounds" (2005)
- "OK" (2005)
- "Ring.Click.Tink EP" (2005)
- "Shminimal" (2005)
- "Meany" (2006)
- "Neds" / "Ilsa" (2006)
- "Never Want To See You Again" (2006)
- "Snider" / "Make My Day" (2006)
- "Hanged Man EP" (2006)
- "Prima Materia" (2006)

=== Remixes ===
- "Way Up High" by Funk D'Void (2004)
- "Bright Lights Fading" by Slam (2005)
- "Close Again" by Sid LeRock (2005)
- "Grotbox" by Jeremy P Caulfield (2005)
- "Las Bicicletas Son Para El Verano" by Alex Smoke (2005)
- "Microtron" by Vector Lovers (2005)
- "More Intensity" by Pete Tong & Chris Cox (2005)
- "Muscle Car" by Mylo (2005)
- "Sex Games" by The Backlash (2005)
- "Shift" by Solab (2005)
- "Transmission" by Radio 4 (2005)
- "Safari" by André Kraml (2006)
- "Coufault" by Novox (2006)
- "Halbzeit" by Arne Michel (2006)
- "In The Morning" by Junior Boys (2006)
- "Martyr" by Depeche Mode (2006)
- "Proverb" by Steve Reich (2006)
- "Body2Beat" by Phresh 'N' Low (2006)
- "A Matter of Time" by Osaka Ultras (2007)
- "Don't Start Just Finish It" by The Unknown Wanderer (2007)
