= Ersatz Audio =

American independent record label

Ersatz Audio is an independent record label based in Detroit, Michigan, specializing in electropunk.

The label was started, and continues to be run by, Adam Lee Miller and Nicola Kuperus, who founded the label in part to release records for their own band, Adult. Also on Ersatz Audio are the artists Magas, Tamion 12 Inch, and Blind Leads Nakid, all with a similar sound and concept to Adult. Ersatz Audio also released the compilation album Auto-Biography of Adam Lee's Miller's band Le Car with Ian Clark.

== See also ==
- List of record labels
- List of electronic music record labels
