= Zoë Bestel =

Scottish singer-songwriter

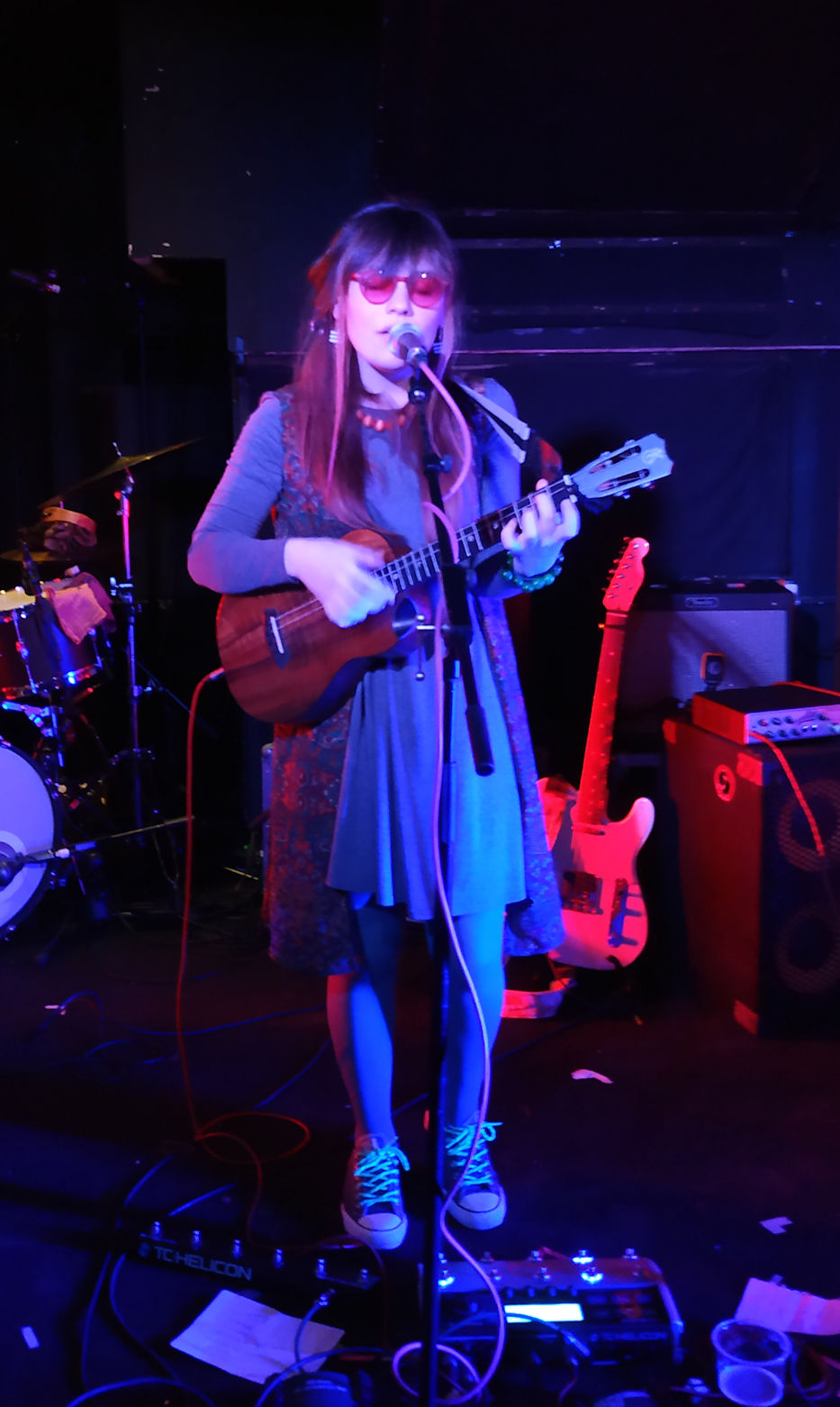
- Bestel performing in November 2019

Background information
- Birth name: Zoë Bestel
- Born: 31 July 1997 (age 28) Liverpool, Merseyside, England
- Origin: Wigtown, Dumfries and Galloway, Scotland
- Genres: Contemporary folk; indie pop
- Instruments: Vocals; ukulele
- Years active: 2012–present
- Labels: Last Night From Glasgow; Zoe Bestel Records; Distilled Records
- Website: zoebestel.co.uk

Zoë Bestel is a Scottish singer-songwriter, who describes her music as Nu-Folk. She started learning the Ukulele in 2011 and released her first EP in 2012. Bestel has released two albums, been nominated for the Scottish Alternative Music Awards under the Best Acoustic category and supported artists such as Nathan Connolly of Snow Patrol, Emily Smith, The Paul McKenna Band, The Peatbog Faeries, Erin Rae, Chris Wood, Paul Brady, Steve Tilston and Bella Hardy.

== Early life ==
Zoë Bestel was born in Liverpool, England in 1997 and aged 8 moved with her family to Wigtown, Scotland. Prior to taking up music professionally she won awards for the piano, recorder, oboe and singing at the Galloway Music Festival. In 2011, aged 13, she started teaching herself the ukulele.

== Career ==
=== Early years (2012-2017) ===
Bestel's first EP ’35 Missed Calls’ was released by Distilled Records in 2012, reaching No.3 on the Amazon Folk Chart. In the same year she was named as Dumfries and Galloway Life Magazine's Performer of the year and supported the Peatbog Faeries. In 2013 she was awarded the chance to appear on the Danny Kyle Open Stage at Celtic Connections.

In 2014 Bestel released the album 'Sir Lucas & The Moon', featuring entirely original songs and produced by Huey Dowling. Bestel self-released the album, designing her own artwork. The album was chosen as the Daily Record's album of the week. Reviews praised the expressiveness and passion of her singing and ukulele playing. In September of the same year Bestel took part in a three-date tour as part of the 'Hit the Road' project run by The Scottish Music Centre. She played in Dumfries, Edinburgh and Fort William alongside Lewis Capaldi and Jacob and Rory Green. The project offered the young musicians the chance to go on a small tour, headlining one gig while supporting the other artists at two other dates.

In April 2015 Bestel attended an event called 'A&R You Brave Enough', organised by Wide Days, a music industry convention. At the event she was the only artist to receive praise from all the industry guests. In June of that year she attended a Prince's Trust reception at Holyrood Palace and performed a song for Prince Charles. Bestel received £1,000 from the trust to aid in becoming a professional musician.

Bestel contributed a song to the charity album Songs for the Sea Vol. 1, released on 4 May 2017. As of February 2020 the album had raised over $3,650 for Chesapeake Bay Foundation, Coral Reef Alliance, Orange County Coastkeeper and One Percent for the Planet.

=== Transcience (2018-present) ===
The not-for-profit record label Last Night From Glasgow announced in late 2017 that in 2018 they would be releasing Zoe Bestel's next album 'Transience'. The album was recorded in Copenhagen, produced by Tobias Elof.

The Herald newspaper included three tracks from the album in their 'Top 100 Tunes from Scotland in 2018', with the Track 'Eye for an Eye' being placed at number six, describing her singing style as a 'soothing, soaring voice'. Reviews of the album were positive, praising "graceful and soothing vocals" and the "beauty and fragility" of the songs. Following the release of Transience, Bestel was nominated for the 2018 Best Acoustic award at the Scottish Alternative Music Awards.

A piece of Bestel's music was used for an advert for the Samsung Frame television in 2019, under a Synchronization license.

Bestel contributed a synth cover of Medicine Men's Show What You're Made Of to Last Night from Glasgow's Isolation Sessions 2020 fundraising album. The track was placed at number six in The Herald's 'Top 100 Tunes from Scotland in 2020' list.

In 2020 Bestel announced that she would be recording new music.
