= Ian Button =

English guitarist (born 1962)

Ian Button (born 16 April 1962) is an English guitarist best known for his work in the bands Thrashing Doves (1985-1991) and Death In Vegas (1994-2011). Button was one of a core of additional musicians originally brought in by Death In Vegas founders Richard Fearless and Steve Hellier, and his contribution was significant throughout the band's first four albums and in the live band up to 2004.

Button's professional musical career began in the early 1980s shortly after he left University of Leeds. In summer 1981 he had been in talks with The Sisters of Mercy in Leeds about becoming their drummer - in the event he returned to Kent after only a year of his studies, got a job at Pinnacle Records, and joined the band that would eventually become Thrashing Doves. (Button was approached again to play guitar for The Sisters of Mercy in 2001).

Alongside his long-term band projects through the 1980s and 90s his career included a range of sessions live and on record for artists such as Dot Allison, Cathy Dennis, Brandon Block and Arthur Baker - he also wrote and recorded the theme for BBC One's The Saturday Show in 2001.

From 2004-2021, Button also worked as a freelance lecturer in music production and other related subjects at Point Blank Music School, Canterbury Christ Church University, Canterbury College, Kent and University of Westminster.

He has largely switched to drums as his main instrument and has been involved in playing live and on recordings for a number of projects including the antifolk bands Paul Hawkins & The Awkward Silences, Lucy's Diary, Sergeant Buzfuz and David Cronenberg's Wife, D.I.V bassist Mat Flint's band Deep Cut, Wreckless Eric, Robert Rotifer, Picturebox, Mark & The Clouds, Darren Hayman, Mary Epworth, Judy Dyble & Andy Lewis, Twink, André Heller, Louis Philippe, Pete Astor, Robert Forster, Helen McCookerybook and Go Kart Mozart (whose album Mozart's Mini-Mart he produced with Lawrence).

His work in production has involved mixing and mastering releases for a range of independent labels including Tapete Records, Cherry Red Records, Fortuna Pop!, Blang Records, WIAIWYA and Fika Recordings. He has also composed and recorded library/production music in projects for Universal Music Group, Bucks Music Group, Ravenwood Music and JW Media Music.

Since 1993, Button has released his own material under various aliases: Motorcyclone, Ashley Flowers, and The Anthony Anderson Project (he used the name Anthony Anderson as his credit on the first Death In Vegas album Dead Elvis).

In December 2011, he began work on material for an album with a new project that would become Papernut Cambridge, his current band/collective which has gone on to release a series of albums since 2013 on Gare Du Nord Records - the label Button founded with Robert Rotifer and Ralegh Long.

In 2020, Button joined Swansea Sound.. He later joined the regrouped Heavenly, featuring his Swansea Sounds bandmates, Amelia Fletcher and Robert Pursey.
