= Mat Flint =

- Born: Mat Flint
- Origin: Coventry, England
- Genres: Alternative rock, Shoegaze, Electronic rock
- Occupations: Musician, Songwriter
- Instruments: Guitar, Bass guitar, Organ, Vocals
- Years active: Late 1980s–present
- Labels: Club AC30, Gare Du Nord

Mat Flint is an English musician, who has been a member of several bands including Revolver (1990–1994), Hot Rod (1993), Death in Vegas (1996–2005), and Deep Cut (2006–present).

== Biography ==
Flint hails from Coventry, grew up near Peterborough, before his family moved to Winchester when he was 16. He played in one band prior to Revolver, with future Revolver drummer Nick Dewey. They formed Revolver in 1990, with Flint acting as vocalist and guitarist and also playing organ. After two albums and several singles, they split up in early 1994. The previous year, Flint had joined Paula Kelley of Drop Nineteens' band Hot Rod, in which he played bass and provided backing vocals. The band also featured John Dragonetti and Eric Paull. They released a single album in 1993, Speed Danger Death. Flint then joined Death in Vegas as bassist, and played on all of their albums, as well as performing at every live show from 1996 to 2005. In 2006, Flint formed a new band, Deep Cut, in which he plays guitar, releasing a single "Commodity" in May 2007, on Club AC30 Records, and following this with "Time to Kill" in 2008 and debut album My Thoughts Light Fires in February 2009. Deep Cut's new album Disorientation was released by Club AC30 in September 2011.

Flint supports Coventry City F.C.

== Discography ==
=== with Revolver ===
see Revolver discography

=== with Hot Rod ===
- Speed Danger Death CD (1993), Caroline

=== with Death in Vegas ===
see Death in Vegas discography

=== with Deep Cut ===
==== Albums ====
- My Thoughts Light Fires (2009), Club AC30
- Disorientation (2011), Club AC30
- Different Planet (2019), Gare Du Nord

==== Singles ====
- "Commodity" (2007), Club AC30
- "Time to Kill" (2008), Club AC30
