= Richard Fearless =

British rock musician

Richard Maguire, known professionally as Richard Fearless, is a British musician. He is the founder of the bands Death in Vegas and Black Acid. In 2004, Death in Vegas created Drone Records for Satan's Circus in the UK. After having moved to New York City he returned to record at his London studio. In 2016, Fearless released Transmission under his Drone Records label. "Consequences of Love" - a coproduction with Sasha Grey - was remixed by Chris & Cosey and Michael Mayer; in 2018, it was used in Mission: Impossible - Fallout.
