= Nicola Kuperus =

American musician

Nicola Kuperus is an American musician and artist. She is a member of the band ADULT. with her husband Adam Lee Miller (formerly of Le Car). ADULT. owns and manages Ersatz Audio, a record label based out of Detroit, Michigan. In 2003 she sang on the Death in Vegas track "Hands Around My Throat", from the album Scorpio Rising and also contributed vocals to "I Dance Alone" on Swayzak's Dirty Dancing album.

She collaborated with Chicks on Speed on the song "Wordy Rappinghood" from their album 99 Cents in 2003 along with other female musicians such as Miss Kittin, Kevin Blechdom, Le Tigre and Tina Weymouth of the Tom Tom Club. "Wordy Rappinghood" became a moderate dance hit in Europe, peaking at number five on the Belgian Dance Chart, and at number sixty-six on the UK Singles Chart.
