= Adam Lee Miller =

American musician

Adam Lee Miller is one half of the band ADULT. and an owner of Ersatz Audio with his wife Nicola Kuperus, who he first collaborated with in his first solo project Artificial Material in the summer of 1997. He was formerly in a band called Le Car, which disbanded in the same year. He started his first punk band in 1986, and would eventually get kicked out for introducing synthesizers. Originally from Indiana, he moved to Detroit in 1989 and attended art school there. As early as 2000, he expressed a preference for "analog synthesizers and drum boxes" over samples and computers for signal processing, limiting the use of computers to musical sequencing and hard-disk recording.
