= Dot Allison =

- Born: Dorothy Elliot Allison; 17 August 1969 (age 57)
- Origin: Edinburgh, Scotland
- Genres: Trip hop
- Occupations: Singer; songwriter
- Years active: 1990–present
- Labels: Heavenly; Mantra; Cooking Vinyl; Arthoused; SA; Sonic Cathedral
- Member of: All Seeing Dolls
- Formerly of: One Dove
- Website: dotallison.co.uk

Dorothy Elliot "Dot" Allison (born 17 August 1969) is a Scottish singer and songwriter, known for her contributions to electronic music, most notably as a result of her tenure fronting the band One Dove in the early 1990s.

== Career ==
In addition to solo ventures, Allison's career has concentrated on collaborative efforts, and has seen her work beside Scott Walker, Massive Attack, Paul Weller, Hal David, Arab Strap, Mick Harvey, Pascal Gabriel, Kevin Shields, Pete Doherty, Xenomania, and Gary Mounfield.

She started her career with Scottish proto-indie-dance outfit One Dove, before she released her debut album, Afterglow, in 1999 to generally positive reviews. It was followed by We Are Science in 2002. In 2007, she released Exaltation of Larks.

Allison's touring group includes members of The Fall, Tindersticks, The Bad Seeds, Massive Attack, and Tokyo Windbag. Stylistically, her music has been described as "trip-hop".

Allison released Room 7½ in 2009. It featured guest appearances from Pete Doherty and Paul Weller.

She contributed vocals to the track "Without Discord" on the soundtrack to the Channel 4 series Henry 8th: The Mind of a Tyrant, written by Philip Sheppard. Allison was the vocal soloist on the film Triangle, directed by Chris Smith. It opened Frightfest at The London Film Festival in 2009. Allison was also the vocal soloist in the film Black Death, starring Sean Bean, released in May 2010. Allison is the vocal soloist in the film The Devil's Double starring Dominic Cooper, which was due for release in 2011. Part of Allison's recording of "Message Personnel", a single taken from the Afterglow album, was used in the fourth episode of the sixth series of the sitcom Ideal. Most recently, Allison wrote the track "Ember", which featured in November 2012 in episode 7 of Channel 4's Fresh Meat alongside Graham Coxon's "Implodium Implodes".

Allison also released the solo albums Heart-Shaped Scars (2021) and Consciousology (2023).

Allison is a member of the group All Seeing Dolls, along with Anton Newcombe of the Brian Jonestown Massacre. The duo released a studio album, Parallel, in 2025.

== Personal life ==
Allison married composer Christian Henson in 2011. She moved back to Edinburgh from London in 2015 to raise her family.

== Discography ==
=== Studio albums ===
- Afterglow (Heavenly Recordings, 1999)
- We Are Science (Mantra Recordings, 2002)
- Exaltation of Larks (Cooking Vinyl, 2007)
- Room 7½ (Arthoused, 2009)
- Heart-Shaped Scars (SA Recordings, 2021)
- Consciousology (Sonic Cathedral, 2023)
- Parallel (with Anton Newcombe, as All Seeing Dolls; A Recordings, 2025)

=== Compilation albums ===
- Acoustic (2003)
- Acoustic 2 (2009)
- Pioneers 01: Dot Allison (2012)
- Demo-itis (2024)

=== Remix albums ===
- Subconsciousology (2025)

=== EPs ===
- Beneath the Ivy (2006)
- The Entangled Remix EP (2022)

=== Singles ===
- "Tomorrow Never Comes" / "I Wanna Feel the Chill" (1999)
- "Mo' Pop" (1999) UK No. 81
- "Colour Me" (1999)
- "Message Personnel" (1999)
- "Close Your Eyes" (1999)
- "Substance" (2002) No. 79
- "Strung Out" (2002) No. 67
- "Sampler" (2002)
- "Cry" (2010)
- "Ghost Orchid" / "Love Died in Our Arms" (2022)

=== Remixes ===
- Saint Etienne – "How We Used to Live (Dot Allison Remix)" (2000)
- Ruby – "Beefheart (Dot Allison Remix)" (2001)
