= Beverley Craven discography =

- Studio albums: 6
- Live albums: 1
- Compilation albums: 4
- Singles: 23
- Video albums: 2

This is the discography of British singer-songwriter Beverley Craven.

== Albums ==
=== Studio albums ===
Title	Album details	Peak chart positions							Certifications
Title	Album details	UK	UK Indie	FRA	GER	NL	NOR	SWI	Certifications
Beverley Craven	Released: 9 July 1990; Label: Epic; Formats: CD, LP, MC	3	—	20	38	27	13	10	FRA: Gold; NL: Gold; UK: 2× Platinum
Love Scenes	Released: 27 September 1993; Label: Epic; Formats: CD, LP, MC	4	—	—	—	54	—	—	UK: Gold
Mixed Emotions	Released: 31 May 1999; Label: Epic; Formats: CD, MC	46	—	—	—	—	—	—	
Close to Home	Released: March 2009; Label: Campsie Music; Formats: CD	—	—	—	—	—	—	—	
Change of Heart	Released: 1 September 2014; Label: Craven Songs & Music; Formats: CD, LP, digital download	90	18	—	—	—	—	—	
Woman to Woman (with Judie Tzuke and Julia Fordham)	Released: 26 October 2018; Label: Right Track; Formats: CD, LP, digital download	42	4	—	—	—	—	—	
"—" denotes releases that did not chart or were not released in that territory.

=== Live albums ===
Title	Album details
Woman to Woman – The Live Concert (with Judie Tzuke and Julia Fordham)	Released: 28 January 2022; Label: Right Track; Formats: 2xCD, 3xLP, digital download

=== Compilation albums ===
Title	Album details
The Very Best of Beverley Craven	Released: July 2004; Label: Epic; Formats: CD
Legends	Released: August 2005; Label: Sony BMG; Formats: 3xCD
Promise Me: The Best of Beverley Craven	Released: 7 February 2011; Label: Camden/Sony Music; Formats: CD, digital download
Memories: The Complete Epic Recordings 1990-1999	Released: 26 May 2023; Label: Cherry Pop; Formats: 3xCD

=== Video albums ===
Title	Album details
Memories	Released: February 1992; Label: SMV Enterprises; Formats: VHS; Collection of promo videoclips and a live performance at the Birmingham Symphony Hall
Live in Concert	Released: 26 July 2010; Label: CRC; Formats: DVD; Live performance at the High Barn in Great Bardfield, Essex, plus the promo videoclip of "Rainbows"

== Singles ==
Title	Year	Peak chart positions							Certifications	Album
Title	Year	UK	BE (FL)	FRA	GER	IRE	NL	US AC	Certifications	Album
"Promise Me"	1990	115	—	—	—	—	—	—		Beverley Craven
"Woman to Woman"	1990	124	—	—	—	—	—	—		Beverley Craven
"Joey"	1990	—	—	—	—	—	—	—		Beverley Craven
"Holding On"	1991	95	—	—	—	—	—	—		Beverley Craven
"Promise Me" (re-release)	1991	3	2	6	—	7	7	—	FRA: Silver; UK: Silver	Beverley Craven
"Holding On" (re-release)	1991	32	—	37	—	28	52	30		Beverley Craven
"Woman to Woman" (re-release)	1991	40	—	—	55	—	—	—		Beverley Craven
"You're Not the First"	1991	—	—	—	—	—	—	—		Beverley Craven
"Memories"	1991	68	—	—	—	—	—	—		Beverley Craven
"Love Scenes"	1993	34	—	—	—	—	—	—		Love Scenes
"Mollie's Song"	1993	61	—	—	—	—	—	—		Love Scenes
"The Winner Takes It All"	1994	77	—	—	—	—	—	—		Love Scenes
"I Miss You" (promo-only release)	1999	—	—	—	—	—	—	—		Mixed Emotions
"Say You're Sorry" (Poland-only promo release)	1999	—	—	—	—	—	—	—		Mixed Emotions
"We Found a Place" (Poland-only promo release)	2000	—	—	—	—	—	—	—		Mixed Emotions
"Rainbows"	2009	—	—	—	—	—	—	—		Close to Home
"You Belong to Someone Else" (promo-only release)	2014	—	—	—	—	—	—	—		Change of Heart
"Love High" (promo-only release)	2015	—	—	—	—	—	—	—		Change of Heart
"Safe" (with Judie Tzuke and Julia Fordham; promo-only release)	2018	—	—	—	—	—	—	—		Woman to Woman
"Christmas Day" (with Judie Tzuke and Julia Fordham)	2019	—	—	—	—	—	—	—		Non-album singles
"Thank You for Being a Friend" (with Judie Tzuke, Julia Fordham and Rumer)	2021	—	—	—	—	—	—	—		Non-album singles
"Juniper Tree" (with Judie Tzuke, Julia Fordham and Rumer)	2021	—	—	—	—	—	—	—		Non-album singles
"Rest of My Life (The Wedding Song)" (with Judie Tzuke, Julia Fordham and Rumer)	2022	—	—	—	—	—	—	—		Non-album singles
"—" denotes releases that did not chart or were not released in that territory.

== Collaborations ==
- 1990: Backing vocals on the song "Where Angels Fear", on Breathe's album Peace of Mind.
- 1992: Contributed the lullaby "Hush Little Baby" to the charity album Tommy's Tape.
- 1999: Lead vocals on the song "The Very Last Time", from Alan Parsons' album The Time Machine.
- 2005: Backing vocals on Rob Cowen's single "Lady Advertiser".
- 2013: Lead vocals on the song "You're Mine", from Nigel Hitchcock's album Smoothitch.
