= Judie Tzuke discography =

- Studio albums: 23
- EPs: 1
- Live albums: 7
- Compilation albums: 9
- Singles: 41
- Video albums: 1

This is the discography of English singer-songwriter Judie Tzuke.

== Albums ==
=== Studio albums ===
Title	Album details	Peak chart positions	
Title	Album details	UK	AUS
Welcome to the Cruise	Released: May 1979; Label: The Rocket Record Company; Formats: LP, MC	14	15
Sports Car	Released: May 1980; Label: The Rocket Record Company; Formats: LP, MC, 8-track	7	67
I Am the Phoenix	Released: May 1981; Label: The Rocket Record Company; Formats: LP, MC	17	—
Shoot the Moon	Released: April 1982; Label: Chrysalis; Formats: LP, MC	19	—
Ritmo	Released: 23 September 1983; Label: Chrysalis; Formats: LP, MC	26	—
The Cat Is Out	Released: June 1985; Label: Legacy; Formats: CD, LP, MC	35	—
Turning Stones	Released: 17 April 1989; Label: Polydor; Formats: CD, LP, MC	57	—
Left Hand Talking	Released: May 1991; Label: Columbia; Formats: CD, LP	—	—
Wonderland	Released: 7 September 1992; Label: Essential; Formats: CD, MC	—	—
Under the Angels	Released: November 1996; Label: Big Moon; Formats: CD	—	—
Secret Agent	Released: December 1998; Label: Big Moon; Formats: CD	—	—
Queen Secret Keeper	Released: 10 December 2001; Label: Big Moon; Formats: CD	—	—
The Beauty of Hindsight	Released: September 2003; Label: Big Moon; Formats: CD	—	—
The End of the Beginning	Released: October 2004; Label: Big Moon; Formats: CD	—	—
Songs 1	Released: 2007; Label: Big Moon; Formats: CD	—	—
Songs 2	Released: June 2008; Label: Big Moon; Formats: CD	—	—
One Tree Less	Released: December 2011; Label: Big Moon; Formats: CD	—	—
Song Club	Released: 2013; Label: Big Moon; Formats: CD, digital download	—	—
Christmas with the Tzukettes	Released: December 2013; Label: Big Moon; Formats: CD	—	—
Songclub Too	Released: May 2014; Label: Big Moon; Formats: CD, digital download	—	—
Peace Has Broken Out	Released: 25 June 2017; Label: Big Moon; Formats: CD, digital download	—	—
Woman to Woman (with Beverley Craven and Julia Fordham)	Released: 26 October 2018; Label: Right Track; Formats: CD, LP, digital download	42	—
Jude the Unsinkable	Released: 20 October 2023; Label: Big Moon; Formats: CD, LP, digital download	—	—
Now or Never	Released: 1 December 2025; Label: Big Moon; Formats: CD, LP, digital download	—	—
"—" denotes releases that did not chart or were not released in that territory.

=== Live albums ===
Title	Album details	Peak chart positions
Title	Album details	UK
Road Noise – The Official Bootleg	Released: October 1982; Label: Chrysalis; Formats: 2xLP, MC	39
BBC in Concert	Released: August 1995; Label: Windsong; Formats: CD	—
Over the Moon	Released: 1997; Label: Big Moon; Formats: CD	—
Six Days Before the Flood	Released: 2000; Label: Big Moon; Formats: CD	—
Drive Live	Released: 2002; Label: Big Moon; Formats: CD	—
The October Road	Released: March 2011; Label: Big Moon; Formats: CD	—
Woman to Woman – The Live Concert (with Beverley Craven and Julia Fordham)	Released: 28 January 2022; Label: Right Track; Formats: 2xCD, 3xLP, digital download	—
"—" denotes releases that did not chart or were not released in that territory.

=== Compilation albums ===
Title	Album details
The Best of Judie Tzuke	Released: June 1983; Label: The Rocket Record Company; Formats: LP, MC
Portfolio – A Message from Radio City	Released: 9 May 1988; Label: Chrysalis; Formats: CD, 2xLP
Stay with Me till Dawn	Released: 1995; Label: Spectrum Music; Formats: CD
The Very Best of Judie Tzuke – Stay with Me till Dawn	Released: September 2001; Label: Music Club; Formats: CD
Welcome to the Cruise & Sportscar	Released: October 2001; Label: Edsel; Formats: 2xCD
Moon on a Mirrorball – The Definitive Collection	Released: 19 April 2010; Label: Wrasse; Formats: 2xCD, digital download
Sportscar / I Am the Phoenix	Released: November 2013; Label: Wrasse; Formats: 2xCD
Full Moon – The Complete Collection	Released: 16 November 2018; Label: Wrasse; Formats: 24xCD box set
The Chrysalis Recordings	Released: 22 May 2020; Label: Cherry Red; Formats: 3xCD

=== Video albums ===
Title	Album details
The 'Cat Is Out' Tour	Released: 2001; Label: Classic Pictures; Formats: DVD

== EPs ==
Title	Album details
Lockdown 2020	Released: May 2021; Label: Self-released; Formats: CD

== Singles ==
Title	Year	Peak chart positions						Album
Title	Year	UK	AUS	IRE	NL	US	US AC	Album
"These Are the Laws" (with Mike Paxman)	1977	—	—	—	—	—	—	Non-album single
"For You"	1978	—	—	—	—	—	—	Welcome to the Cruise
"Stay with Me till Dawn"	1979	16	8	19	50	101	47	Welcome to the Cruise
"Welcome to the Cruise" (Netherlands and Australia-only release)	1979	—	—	—	—	—	—	Welcome to the Cruise
"Understanding"	1980	— (Note: This single did not enter the UK Singles Chart, but did reach number 97 on the Record Business Singles Chart.)	—	—	—	—	—	Sports Car
"The Choices You've Made"	1980	—	—	—	—	—	—	Sports Car
"Living on the Coast" (Australia-only release)	1980	—	—	—	—	—	—	Sports Car
"I Never Know Where My Heart Is"	1981	—	—	—	—	—	—	I Am the Phoenix
"Higher and Higher"	1981	—	—	—	—	—	—	I Am the Phoenix
"Love on the Border"	1982	—	—	—	—	—	—	Shoot the Moon
"I'm Not a Loser"	1982	— (Note: This single did not enter the UK Singles Chart, but did reach number 114 on the Record Business Bubbling Under Singles 101–150 chart.)	—	—	—	—	—	Shoot the Moon
"Late Again"	1982	—	—	—	—	—	—	Shoot the Moon
"Black Furs"	1983	96	—	—	—	—	—	'The Best of Judie Tzuke
"Jeannie No"	1983	—	—	—	—	—	—	Ritmo
"How Do I Feel"	1983	—	—	—	—	—	—	Ritmo
"You"	1984	92	—	—	—	—	—	The Cat Is Out
"I'll Be the One"	1985	97	—	—	—	—	—	The Cat Is Out
"Love Like Fire"	1985	—	—	—	—	—	—	The Cat Is Out
"This Side of Heaven"	1985	—	—	—	—	—	—	The Cat Is Out
"How Sweet It Is" (Germany-only release)	1985	—	—	—	—	—	—	The Cat Is Out
"We'll Go Dreaming"	1989	96	—	—	—	—	—	Turning Stones
"Let Me Be the Pearl"	1989	—	—	—	—	—	—	Turning Stones
"God Only Knows"	1990	—	—	—	—	—	—	Left Hand Talking
"Outlaws"	1991	—	—	—	—	—	—	Left Hand Talking
"Wonderland"	1992	—	—	—	—	—	—	Wonderland
"Fly"	1992	—	—	—	—	—	—	Wonderland
"Drive"	2001	—	—	—	—	—	—	Queen Secret Keeper
"Vacancies" (Freddie Lequient featuring Judie Tzuke)	2004	—	—	—	—	—	—	Non-album single
"The Captain of Her Heart" (Project Grand Slam featuring Judie Tzuke)	2008	—	—	—	—	—	37	Play (by Project Grand Slam)
"If (When You Go)"	2010	—	—	—	—	—	—	Moon on a Mirrorball – The Definitive Collection
"Love Me No More" (promo-only release)	2010	—	—	—	—	—	—	Moon on a Mirrorball – The Definitive Collection
"Humankind" (promo-only release)	2012	—	—	—	—	—	—	One Tree Less
"Safe" (with Beverley Craven and Julia Fordham; promo-only release)	2018	—	—	—	—	—	—	Woman to Woman
"Christmas Day" (with Beverley Craven and Julia Fordham)	2019	—	—	—	—	—	—	Non-album single
"Birds and Time"	2020	—	—	—	—	—	—	Lockdown 2020 (EP)
"Hydra"	2020	—	—	—	—	—	—	Lockdown 2020 (EP)
"Idiot Kings"	2020	—	—	—	—	—	—	Lockdown 2020 (EP)
"Stealing"	2020	—	—	—	—	—	—	Lockdown 2020 (EP)
"Thank You for Being a Friend" (with Beverley Craven, Julia Fordham and Rumer)	2021	—	—	—	—	—	—	Non-album singles
"Juniper Tree" (with Beverley Craven, Julia Fordham and Rumer)	2021	—	—	—	—	—	—	Non-album singles
"Rest of My Life (The Wedding Song)" (with Beverley Craven, Julia Fordham and Rumer)	2022	—	—	—	—	—	—	Non-album singles
"—" denotes releases that did not chart or were not released in that territory.
