= Legends (Beverley Craven album) =

Compilation album by Beverley Craven
- Released: 2005 (UK)
- Genre: pop
- Label: Epic
- Producers: Paul Samwell-Smith; Beverley Craven

Beverley Craven chronology
The Very Best Of Beverley Craven (2004)	Legends (2005)	Close To Home (2009)

Legends is a compilation album by Beverley Craven, released in 2005 through Epic Records. The album was issued in a 3-CD box set and includes Craven's first three albums and a selection of B-sides and live tracks.

== Track listing ==
Disc 1

1. "Promise Me"
2. "Holding On"
3. "Woman to Woman"
4. "Memories"
5. "I Miss You"
6. "Castle in the Clouds"
7. "You're Not the First"
8. "Joey"
9. "Two of a Kind"
10. "I Listen to the Rain"
11. "Missing You"
12. "In Those Days"
13. "Love Is the Light"

Disc 2

1. "Hope"
2. "Look No Further"
3. "Mollie's Song"
4. "Love Scenes"
5. "Feels Like the First Time"
6. "Blind Faith"
7. "Lost Without You"
8. "The Winner Takes It All"
9. "Tick Tock"
10. "Come Home to Me"
11. "Move On"
12. "We Found a Place"
13. "Say You're Sorry"

Disc 3

1. "Talk to Me"
2. "She Doesn't Need Saving"
3. "Phoenix from the Fire"
4. "Afraid of Letting Go"
5. "Everything But the Blues"
6. "It Doesn't Have to End This Way"
7. "Hush Little Baby"
8. "Holding On" (West Coast Version)
9. "Love Scenes" (live)
10. "Memories" (live)
11. "Joey" (live)
12. "Two of a Kind" (live)
