= These Humble Machines =

Compilation album by BT
- Released: April 26, 2011
- Genre: Trance, electronica, glitch, breakbeat
- Length: 57:49
- Label: Nettwerk; 405 Recordings; Black Hole Recordings; New State Recordings
- Producer: BT

BT chronology
These Hopeful Machines (2010)	These Humble Machines (2011)	These Re-Imagined Machines (2011)

Singles from These Humble Machines
- 1. "Always" Released: April 25, 2011; 2. "A Million Stars" Released: July 19, 2011

These Humble Machines is a compilation album by American electronic musician BT, composed of edited versions of songs from his album These Hopeful Machines. Released on April 26, 2011, the album was released with the intention of making it more accessible for newer listeners while still displaying the same technical prowess found in its predecessor. The album features some radio edits ("Suddenly", "Always") while also using splice editing and fade-outs to edit down songs ("The Emergency", "Every Other Way", "Le nocturne de lumière").

== Track listing ==
No.	Title	Writer(s)	Length
1.	"Suddenly"	BT, Christian Burns	4:28
2.	"The Emergency"	BT, Christian Burns, Andrew Bayer	4:27
3.	"Every Other Way"	BT, JES	4:03
4.	"The Light in Things"	BT, JES	5:47
5.	"The Rose of Jericho"	BT	4:06
6.	"Forget Me"	BT, Christian Burns	5:10
7.	"A Million Stars"	BT, Kirsty Hawkshaw, Ulrich Schnauss	6:38
8.	"Love Can Kill You"	BT	4:07
9.	"Always"	BT, Rob Dickinson	4:29
10.	"Le Nocturne de Lumière"	BT	4:42
11.	"The Unbreakable"	BT, Rob Dickinson	6:51
12.	"The Ghost in You"	The Psychedelic Furs	4:51
Total length:			59:39

== Personnel ==
- Track 1: Vocals by BT and Christian Burns
- Track 2: Vocals by BT. Background vocals by Christian Burns.
- Track 3: Vocals by JES. Background vocals by BT and Christian Burns.
- Track 4: Vocals by JES.
- Track 6: Vocals by BT. Background vocals by Christian Burns.
- Track 7: Vocals by Kirsty Hawkshaw. Background vocals by BT.
- Track 8: Vocals by BT. Background vocals by Christian Burns.
- Track 9, 11: Vocals by Rob Dickinson.
- Track 12: Vocals by BT. Background vocals by Amelia June.
