= These Re-Imagined Machines =

Compilation album by BT
- Released: May 30, 2011
- Genre: Trance, electronica, glitch, breakbeat, ambient
- Length: 2:17:06 (2 disc version); 3:14:45 (3 disc version)
- Label: Black Hole Recordings; New State Music; Nettwerk
- Producer: BT

BT chronology
These Humble Machines (2011)	These Re-Imagined Machines (2011)	Laptop Symphony (2012)

These Re-Imagined Machines is a remix album by American electronic musician BT, composed of remixed versions of songs from his album These Hopeful Machines by various artists. The album was released on May 20, 2011.

== Track listing ==
Disc 1
No.	Title	Length
1.	"Le Nocturne de Lumière (Cedric Gervais Remix)"	8:33
2.	"The Rose of Jericho (Adam K & Soha Remix)"	7:56
3.	"Always (Funkagenda Mix)"	6:59
4.	"Love Can Kill You (Moonbeam Remix)"	4:47
5.	"The Emergency (Marcus Schössow Remix)"	7:09
6.	"Every Other Way (Josh Gabriel Remix)"	7:23
7.	"Suddenly (Ferry Corsten Remix)"	8:16
8.	"Forget Me (Mr. Sam Remix)"	6:38
9.	"The Unbreakable (Grayarea Mix)"	12:13
Total length:		1:09:54

Disc 2
No.	Title	Length
1.	"The Emergency (Lost Stories Remix vs. Dragon, Jontron, Manufactured Superstars Remix)"	12:37
2.	"The Rose of Jericho (Sultan & Ned Shepard Remix)"	6:50
3.	"A Million Stars (Digital Stories Remix)"	8:15
4.	"The Light in Things (tyDi Remix)"	8:20
5.	"Always (Chicane Remix)"	7:34
6.	"The Unbreakable (Breakfast Remix)"	7:49
7.	"Forget Me (Michael Cassette Mix)"	6:14
8.	"Every Other Way (Armin van Buuren Remix)"	9:33
Total length:		1:07:12

Disc 3
No.	Title	Length
1.	"Every Other Way (Kearley Mix Vs. Hammock Re-Interpretation)"	11:08
2.	"Le Nocturne de Lumiere (Richard Devine Mix)"	6:19
3.	"Suddenly (JJ Mix)"	4:29
4.	"The Ghost in You (Kearley in the Clouds Edit)"	7:40
5.	"The Unbreakable (Carmen Rizzo Mix)"	5:40
6.	"Always (Rachel Black Re-Interpretation)"	8:13
7.	"Forget Me (Amelia June Re-Interpretation)"	5:41
Total length:		57:39
