= The Very Best of Beverley Craven =

The Very Best Of Beverley Craven

Greatest hits album by Beverley Craven
- Released: 2004 (UK)
- Genre: Pop
- Label: Epic
- Producers: Paul Samwell-Smith, Beverley Craven

Beverley Craven chronology
Mixed Emotions (1999)	The Very Best Of Beverley Craven (2004)	Legends (2005)

The Very Best Of Beverley Craven is a compilation album by Beverley Craven, released in 2004 through Epic Records.

== Track listing ==
1. "Promise Me"
2. "Woman to Woman"
3. "Holding On"
4. "Memories"
5. "Joey"
6. "Two of a Kind"
7. "Love Scenes"
8. "Love Is the Light"
9. "Mollie's Song"
10. "Feels Like the First Time"
11. "We Found a Place"
12. "Say You're Sorry"
13. "Phoenix from the Fire"
14. "Tick Tock"
- Tracks 1–7,9–14 written by Beverley Craven
- Track 8 written by Beverley Craven and Colin Campsie
