= Love Scenes =

Love Scenes may refer to:

== Film ==
- Love Scenes, a 1984 erotic movie, with Monique Gabrielle and Tiffany Bolling, from Playboy Productions

== Music ==
- Love Scenes (Diana Krall album), 1997
- Love Scenes (Beverley Craven album), 1993
- "Love Scenes" (song), a 1993 song by Beverley Craven
