= Movement in Still Life =

Studio album by BT
- Released: October 8, 1999
- Genres: Electronica; breakbeat; progressive trance; techno
- Length: 73:52 (UK); 56:35 (US); 74:04 (4×LP)
- Labels: Headspace; Pioneer; Black Hole; Nettwerk; EMI (US)
- Producers: Brian Transeau; Sasha; Andy Gray; Adam Freeland; Kevin Beber; Paul van Dyk; Hybrid

BT chronology
ESCM (1997)	Movement in Still Life (1999)	Movement (2000)

Alternative covers
- US cover

Singles from Movement in Still Life
- 1. "Godspeed" Released: 1998; 2. "Mercury and Solace" Released: 1999; 3. "Hip-Hop Phenomenon" Released: 1999; 4. "Smartbomb" Released: 2000; 5. "Fibonacci Sequence" Released: 2000; 6. "Shame" Released: 2000; 7. "Never Gonna Come Back Down" Released: 2000; 8. "Dreaming" Released: 2000

Professional ratings
Aggregate scores
Source	Rating
Metacritic	73/100
Review scores
Source	Rating
AllMusic	4/5 stars
Entertainment Weekly	A−
Pitchfork	7.6/10
Q	3/5 stars
Slant Magazine	3.5/5 stars

Movement in Still Life is the third studio album by American electronica artist BT. It was released in the United Kingdom on October 8, 1999, and a different version released in the United States in 2000. A transition towards hip hop, it includes the singles "Godspeed", "Dreaming", and in the US, "Never Gonna Come Back Down". The original cover art is a photogram, Invocation, by Adam Fuss.

== Background ==
Movement in Still Life was completely redesigned in the US for an American audience. This version has several minutes cut from each track and is presented in an unmixed manner with breaks in between songs. The tracks were also rearranged: The original closer, "Satellite", was moved to the middle and replaced by the hip hop track "Love on Haight Street", while the opening song was also moved to the centre of the record and replaced by "Madskillz-Mic Chekka" and the US single "Never Gonna Come Back Down", featuring Mike Doughty of Soul Coughing on vocals. "Ride", "The Hip Hop Phenomenon", "Giving Up the Ghost" and "Namistai" were replaced with "Shame" and "Smartbomb"; the latter of which was later sampled for *NSYNC's international hit "Pop", also produced by BT. The album's Australian version mostly uses the UK track listing, but replaces "The Hip Hop Phenomenon" with "Never Gonna Come Back Down", mixing it into its surrounding tracks with transitions.

A song called "Far From Goodbye (Later My Love)" was released in a sampler of the album in 1999, but never released officially.

There are two versions of the album on vinyl: a double LP, with a variant of the UK track listing; and a four-LP version with eight tracks, with one song per side, featuring extended mixes. Several of these extended mixes were later added to a Special Edition double-CD set from Hong Kong, which also included other extended mixes.

== Singles ==
Movement in Still Life ties These Hopeful Machines with the most singles BT ever released from one album, largely due to the differences between the UK and US versions. Tracks like "Godspeed" and "Mercury and Solace" did well in the UK, but would not fare well on US radio, where "Never Gonna Come Back Down" and "Shame" performed well on American alternative rock stations. "Smartbomb" was used in several films, most notably in 3000 Miles to Graceland, and was used in the video game FreQuency. The Plump DJs remix of "Smartbomb" and "Hip Hop Phenomenon" were featured in the video game SSX Tricky. The Plump DJs remix also appears in Wipeout Fusion. A remix of "Never Gonna Come Back Down" was featured in FIFA Football 2002. "Ride" was originally released in 1998 as a single by 2 Phat Cunts, a group comprising BT and Sasha.

The track "Satellite" contains excerpts from the crew of NASA space shuttle mission STS-51-A during their post-mission press conference.

== Track listing ==
UK
No.	Title	Writer(s)	Producer(s)	Length
1.	"Movement in Still Life"	Brian Transeau; Clifton "Jiggs" Chase; Ed Fletcher; Melvin Glover; Sylvia Robinson	Transeau; Andy Gray	6:32
2.	"Ride"	Transeau; Sasha	Transeau; Sasha	4:56
3.	"Madskillz-Mic Chekka"	Transeau; Planet Asia; Rascoe	Transeau	5:36
4.	"The Hip Hop Phenomenon" (with Tsunami One)	Transeau; Adam Freeland; Kevin Beber	Transeau; Freeland; Beber	5:17
5.	"Mercury and Solace"	Transeau; Jan Johnston	Transeau; Andy Page	7:42
6.	"Dreaming"	Transeau; Judie Tzuke; Mike Paxman; Paul Muggleton	Transeau; Page; Gaëtan Schurrer	9:15
7.	"Giving Up the Ghost"	Transeau	Transeau	6:43
8.	"Godspeed"	Transeau	Transeau; Hybrid	6:44
9.	"Namistai (Note: This track was renamed "Namasté" on the UK Limited Edition release. However, the original name, "Namistai", is considered to be the official title by fans.)"	Transeau; Paul van Dyk	Transeau; van Dyk	6:51
10.	"Running Down the Way Up"	Transeau; Kirsty Hawkshaw; Mike Truman	Transeau; Hybrid	8:36
11.	"Satellite"	Transeau	Transeau; Gray	5:40
Total length:				73:52

UK limited edition bonus disc
No.	Title	Length
12.	"Never Gonna Come Back Down"	5:47
13.	"Fibonacci Sequence"	9:28
14.	"Godspeed (Hybrid Mix)"	7:03
15.	"Mercury and Solace (Reach Out) (Mark Shimmon Remix)"	6:43
16.	"Dreaming (Evolution Mix)"	10:11
17.	"Dreaming (Libra Mix)"	9:19
18.	"Namistai (Extended Version)"	9:28
Total length:		131:52

US
No.	Title	Length
1.	"Madskillz-Mic Chekka"	4:52
2.	"Never Gonna Come Back Down"	5:47
3.	"Dreaming"	5:19
4.	"Shame"	3:21
5.	"Movement in Still Life"	4:30
6.	"Satellite"	5:11
7.	"Godspeed"	5:10
8.	"Running Down the Way Up"	5:51
9.	"Mercury and Solace"	5:07
10.	"Smartbomb"	5:10
11.	"Love on Haight Street"	6:17
Total length:		51:35

Japan (Disc One)
No.	Title	Length
1.	"Movement in Still Life"	6:32
2.	"Ride"	4:56
3.	"Madskillz-Mic Chekka"	5:36
4.	"Hip Hop Phenomenon"	5:17
5.	"Mercury and Solace (Reach Out)"	7:42
6.	"Dreaming"	9:15
7.	"Give Up the Ghost"	6:43
8.	"Godspeed"	6:44
9.	"Namistai"	6:51
10.	"Running Down the Way Up"	8:36
11.	"Satellite"	5:40
Total length:		73:52

Japan (Disc Two)
No.	Title	Length
12.	"The Fibonacci Sequence"	9:28
13.	"Sunblind"	10:18
Total length:		93:38

=== 2x vinyl version ===
Side A
No.	Title	Length
1.	"Movement in Still Life"	6:32
2.	"Ride"	4:56
3.	"Madskillz-Mic Chekka"	5:36

Side B
No.	Title	Length
4.	"The Hip Hop Phenomenon"	5:17
5.	"Mercury and Solace"	7:42
6.	"Godspeed"	6:44

Side C
No.	Title	Length
7.	"Dreaming"	9:15
8.	"Giving Up the Ghost"	6:43

Side D
No.	Title	Length
9.	"Namistai"	6:51
10.	"Running Down the Way Up"	8:36
11.	"Satellite"	5:40
Total length:		73:52

== Personnel ==
- BT – all other vocals, instruments and programming

=== Musicians ===
- Peanut Butter Wolf – record scratching on "Movement in Still Life" and "Love on Haight Street"
- Planet Asia – vocals on "Madskillz-Mic Chekka"
- Hutchi – vocals on "Madskillz-Mic Chekka"
- Rasco – vocals on "Madskillz-Mic Chekka", "Smartbomb" and "Love on Haight Street"
- DJ Davey Dave – "cuts" and "scratching" on "Madskillz-Mic Chekka" and "Smartbomb"
- Jan Johnston – vocals on "Mercury and Solace" and "Sunblind", backing vocals on "Dreaming"
- DJ Rap – vocals on "Giving Up the Ghost"
- Kirsty Hawkshaw – vocals on "Dreaming" and "Running Down the Way Up"
- Scott Frassetto – live drums on "Satellite"
- Richard Fortus – guitars on "Shame", "Running Down the Way Up" and "Smartbomb"
- Mike Doughty – vocals on "Never Gonna Come Back Down"
- Fifty Grand – vocals on "Love on Haight Street"

=== Production ===
- Sasha – co-production on "Ride"
- Adam Freeland – co-production on "Madskillz-Mic Chekka"
- Kevin Beber – co-production on "Madskillz-Mic Chekka"
- Tsunami One (Adam Freeland & Kevin Beber) – co-writing and production on "The Hip Hop Phenomenon"
- Paul van Dyk – co-production on "Namasté"
- Hybrid – co-production on "Running Down the Way Up" and co-credited with "Godspeed"

== Charts ==
Chart	Peak position
UK Albums Chart (OCC)	87
US Billboard 200	166
US Heatseekers Albums (Billboard)	8
US Top Album Sales (Billboard)	166
