= Woman to Woman (Beverley Craven, Judie Tzuke and Julia Fordham album) =

Studio album by Beverley Craven, Judie Tzuke and Julia Fordham
- Released: 26 October 2018
- Recorded: 2017–2018
- Genre: Folk rock; pop
- Length: 40:16
- Label: Right Track
- Producer: Beverley Craven; Grant Mitchell; Kevin Malpass; Paul Muggleton; Paul Samwell-Smith

Beverley Craven chronology
Change of Heart (2014)	Woman to Woman (2018)

Judie Tzuke chronology
Peace Has Broken Out (2017)	Woman to Woman (2018)

Julia Fordham chronology
Live & Untouched (2016)	Woman to Woman (2018)

Woman to Woman is a collaborative album by English singers Beverley Craven, Judie Tzuke and Julia Fordham, released in 2018. It features a selection of each of the trio's own past solo songs being sung together in harmony, along with new material. The album was accompanied by a UK tour.

== Commercial performance ==
Woman to Woman reached number 42 on the UK Albums Chart, becoming Tzuke's first album to reach the top 75 since 1989's Turning Stones; it was Craven's first top 75 appearance since 1999's Mixed Emotions and Fordham's first charting album since Falling Forward in 1994.

== Track listing ==
1. "Safe" (Beth Nielsen Chapman, Judie Tzuke)
2. "Impossible Dreamer" (Julia Fordham)
3. "Let It Be Me" (Beverley Craven)
4. "Temporary" (David P Goodes, Tzuke)
5. "A Photo Every Christmas" (Fordham)
6. "If (When You Go)" (Tzuke, Steve Anderson)
7. "Bring the Rain" (Tzuke, Mike Paxman)
8. "Cowboy" (Fordham)
9. "Where Does the Time Go?" (Fordham)
10. "For You" (Tzuke, Paxman)
11. "Promise Me" (bonus track; Craven)

== Charts ==
Chart performance for Woman to Woman
Chart (2018)	Peak position
Scottish Albums (OCC)	38
UK Albums (OCC)	42
