= These Hopeful Machines =

Studio album by BT
- Released: February 1, 2010
- Genres: Electronica, progressive breaks, progressive house, trance
- Length: 108:26
- Label: Black Hole
- Producer: BT

BT chronology
This Binary Universe (2006)	These Hopeful Machines (2010)	These Humble Machines (2011)

Singles from These Hopeful Machines
- 1. "The Rose of Jericho" Released: June 9, 2009; 2. "Every Other Way" Released: December 22, 2009; 3. "Suddenly" Released: January 12, 2010; 4. "Forget Me" Released: June 14, 2010; 5. "The Emergency" Released: September 28, 2010; 6. "Le Nocturne De Lumière" Released: November 23, 2010; 7. "Always" Released: May 17, 2011; 8. "A Million Stars" Released: August 16, 2011

These Hopeful Machines is the sixth studio album by American electronic musician BT. Released on February 1, 2010, the album sees collaborations with the likes of JES, Rob Dickinson, Christian Burns and Kirsty Hawkshaw, also featuring a cover of "The Ghost in You" by The Psychedelic Furs. Because some tracks exceed 10 minutes in length, the album spans two discs with six tracks on each. In an effort to make the album more accessible to casual listeners, the record was eventually re-issued as a single-disc version with shorter tracks, titled These Humble Machines. In addition, the album would later spawn a double disc remix edition titled These Re-Imagined Machines, also featured as a "Limited Collector's Edition Box Set". With great reception from critics, the album was nominated for the 2011 Grammy Awards under Best Electronic/Dance Album.

== Background ==
On June 9, 2009, the first part of the single "The Rose of Jericho" was released on Beatport, and the second (and last) part was released on June 23, 2009. Five remixes were released in all in these two parts along with BT's 'Deus Ex Machina Album Mix'. The next single, "Every Other Way" was released on December 22, 2009. The third single of the album, "Suddenly", was the last to be released, on January 12, 2010, for digital-download only. Since the album release, the fourth and fifth singles, "Forget Me" and "The Emergency", were released on June 14, 2010 and September 28, 2010, respectively. The album was mastered by Joe LaPorta.

BT chose to release the album online to digital retailers as two large tracks to preserve the feel of an album. On release day, an MP3 exclusive version of These Hopeful Machines was offered by Amazon which included a bonus remix of "Always", by Chicane. This download was available as 2 full A/B side tracks instead of the 12 individual album tracks. The album was nominated for the 2011 Grammy Awards under "Best Electronic/Dance Album".

== Reception ==
Professional ratings
Review scores
Source	Rating
AllMusic	3.5/5 stars
Absolute Punk	82%
Sputnikmusic	3/5 stars
USA Today	3.5/4 stars
Wired.com	9/10

USA Today: "...even techno-phobes will be seduced by (BT's) forward-thinking musicality."

Allmusic: "These Hopeful Machines doesn't try to convince, it's meant to reward the already converted with a vast wonderland of melodic glitch and prolonged bliss."

Wired: "If you've never liked electronica before, this is the release that could change your mind."

Sinning in LA: "Both discs offer compelling rides from start to finish."

== Track listing ==
Disc one ("Side A")
No.	Title	Writer(s)	Length
1.	"Suddenly"	BT, Christian Burns	8:06
2.	"The Emergency"	BT, Andrew Bayer	10:38
3.	"Every Other Way"	BT, JES	11:23
4.	"The Light in Things"	BT, JES	10:47
5.	"The Rose of Jericho"	BT	7:43
6.	"Forget Me"	BT, Christian Burns	9:33
Total length:			55:07

Disc two ("Side B")
No.	Title	Writer(s)	Length
1.	"A Million Stars"	BT, Kirsty Hawkshaw, Ulrich Schnauss	12:26
2.	"Love Can Kill You"	BT	5:21
3.	"Always"	BT, Rob Dickinson	6:12
4.	"Le Nocturne de Lumière"	BT	11:38
5.	"The Unbreakable"	BT, Rob Dickinson	10:25
6.	"The Ghost in You"	The Psychedelic Furs	7:57
Total length:			53:19

Japan edition bonus tracks
No.	Title	Length
7.	"The Rose of Jericho" (Sultan & Ned Shepard Remix)	10:19
8.	"Every Other Way" (Armin van Buuren Remix)	8:14
Total length:		75:40

Amazon MP3 Exclusive
No.	Title	Length
1.	"Always" (Chicane Remix)	8:19

== Personnel ==
Disc one

- Track 1: Vocals by BT and Christian Burns.
- Track 2: Vocals by BT. Background vocals by Christian Burns. Additional production by Andrew Bayer.
- Track 3: Vocals by JES. Background vocals by BT and Christian Burns.
- Track 4: Vocals by JES.
- Track 6: Vocals by BT and Christian Burns. End chorus sung by Kaia Transeau.

Disc two

- Track 1: Vocals by Kirsty Hawkshaw. Background vocals by BT. Additional production by Ulrich Schnauss.
- Track 2: Vocals by BT. Background vocals by Christian Burns.
- Track 3, 5: Vocals by Rob Dickinson.
- Track 6: Vocals by BT. Background vocals by Amelia June.

== Release history ==
Country	Date	Label	Catalogue
United States	February 2, 2010	Nettwerk	0 6700 30849 2 5
Canada	February 2, 2010	Nettwerk	0 6700 30849 2 5
Australia	February 2, 2010	405 Recordings	45CD10007
Netherlands	February 2, 2010	Black Hole Recordings	Black Hole CD 61
	March 22, 2010	New State Recordings	NEWCD9070
Japan	July 7, 2010	Victor Entertainment	
