= Wonderland (Judie Tzuke album) =

Studio album by Judie Tzuke
- Released: 7 September 1992
- Studio: Big Ocean Studios, Surrey
- Genre: Pop rock
- Length: 43:26
- Label: Essential/Castle
- Producer: Mike Paxman, Paul Muggleton

Judie Tzuke chronology
| Left Hand Talking (1991) | Wonderland (1992) | Under the Angels (1996) |

Singles from Wonderland
- 1. "Wonderland" Released: 1992; 2. "Fly" Released: 1992

Wonderland is the ninth studio album by the British singer-songwriter Judie Tzuke, released in 1992.

Though released on a small independent label, it was the last of Tzuke's albums to be released before she founded her own record label, Big Moon Records, which has released all of her subsequent albums.

== Track listing ==
All tracks composed by Judie Tzuke and Bob Noble, except where indicated

1. "Wonderland" – 4:45
2. "I Can Read Books" – 4:19
3. "Swimming" (Judie Tzuke, Mike Paxman) – 4:14
4. "Fly" – 3:28
5. "She Loves His Hands" (Judie Tzuke, Mike Paxman) – 5:14
6. "Sara's Gone" – 4:08
7. "Vivien" – 4:19
8. "On a Ship" – 4:49
9. "Keep Control" – 4:56
10. "Man and a Gun" – 3:14
11. "In the Morning" (Bonus track on re-issue)

== Personnel ==
- Judie Tzuke – vocals, backing vocals
- John Parricelli – guitars, acoustic guitar
- Mike Paxman – synthesizers, bass on track 1, drums and guitar on track 6, guitar on track 10, engineer, producer
- Bob Noble – synthesizers, organ, piano, percussion, string arrangements
- Pete Murray – piano, electric piano, synthesizers
- Brad Lang – bass guitar, coffee tin
- Ian Thomas – drums, percussion
- Chris Fletcher – percussion, bells, whistles
- Paul Muggleton – guitar, keyboards, percussion, backing vocals, engineer, producer

Additional musicians

- Andy Hamilton – saxophones on track 1 and 4, EWI woodwind on track 4
- Brian May – guitars on track 2
- Don Snow – backing vocals on track 2
- Mary and Lucy Cooper – backing vocals on track 3
- Nigel Kennedy – violin on track 8

Production

- Mark Evans – engineer, mixing
- Tudor Humphries – cover painting
