= Little White Lies (Status Quo song) =

Single by Status Quo

from the album Under the Influence
- Released: June 1999
- Genre: Rock
- Length: 4:15
- Label: Eagle Records
- Songwriter(s): Rick Parfitt
- Producer(s): Mike Paxman

Status Quo singles chronology
"The Way It Goes" (1999)	"Little White Lies" (1999)	"Twenty Wild Horses" (1999)

"Little White Lies" is a single released by the British Rock band Status Quo in 1999. It was included on the album Under the Influence.

== Track listing ==
=== CD1 ===
1. "Little White Lies" (Edit) (Parfitt) (3.50)
2. "I Knew The Bride" (N Lowe) (3.30)
3. "Pictures Of Matchstick Men" (1999) (Rossi) (3.21)

=== CD2 ===
1. "Little White Lies" (Parfitt) (4.15)
2. "Pictures Of Matchstick Men" (1999) (Rossi) (3.21)
3. "Driving to Glory" (Parfitt/Edwards) (3.42)

== Charts ==
Chart (1999)	Peak position
Netherlands (Single Top 100)	73
UK Singles (OCC)	53
