= Ritmo (album) =

1983 album by Judie Tzuke

- Cover photography by Brian Aris

Studio album by Judie Tzuke
- Released: 23 September 1983
- Studios: Mayfair Studios and Odyssey Studios, London
- Genres: Pop rock, synth-pop
- Length: 39:47
- Label: Chrysalis
- Producers: Paul Muggleton, Mike Paxman

Judie Tzuke chronology
| Road Noise (1982) | Ritmo (1983) | The Cat Is Out (1985) |

Singles from Ritmo
- 1. "Jeannie No" Released: 1983; 2. "How Do I Feel" Released: 1983

Ritmo is the fifth album by English singer-songwriter Judie Tzuke. The album was released in September 1983 and peaked at number 26 in the UK.

The album was Tzuke's second and final studio album to be released during her contract with Chrysalis Records. Originally only released on vinyl album and cassette, it was remastered and released on compact disc in 1994 by BGO Records.

According to Charles Donovan of Popmatters, the songs on Ritmo are strong, particularly the new-wave soul ballad "Shoot From The Heart". Donnovan called the album "chilly and remote", and said it "has an innovative, shadowy atmosphere" and that "its best songs, especially the gothic melodrama, “How Do I Feel”, are like rushes of cold night air striking the face".

== Track listing ==
All tracks by Judie Tzuke, Mike Paxman and Paul Muggleton, except where indicated

Side one

1. "Jeannie No" (Tzuke, Paxman) – 4:28
2. "She Don't Live Here Anymore" – 4:04
3. "Shoot from the Heart" (Tzuke, Paxman) – 4:46
4. "Face to Face" – 5:15

Side two

5. "Another Country" – 2:56
6. "Nighthawks" – 5:02
7. "Walk Don't Walk" – 4:37
8. "Push Push, Pull Pull" – 3:24
9. "How Do I Feel" (Muggleton, Bob Noble) – 5:15

== Personnel ==
Band members

- Judie Tzuke – lead and backing vocals
- Mike Paxman – guitar, percussion, backing vocals, producer
- Bob Noble – keyboards
- John "Rhino" Edwards – bass guitar
- Andy Duncan – drums
- Paul Muggleton – keyboards, percussion, backing vocals, producer

Additional musicians

- Ray Russell – guitar
- Don Snow, Roy White – keyboards, backing vocals
- John Giblin – bass guitar
- Graham Jarvis – drums
- Morris Pert – percussion
- Andy Sheppard – tenor and soprano saxophone
- Jaqi Robinson – backing vocals

Production

- John Hudson – engineer, mixing at Mayfair Studios, London
- Simon Sullivan – engineer, mixing on "Push Push, Pull Pull"
- Bob Parr – engineer
- Jeff Titmus – engineer on "How Do I Feel"
- Carb Canelle – assistant engineer
- John Pasche – design
- Brian Aris – cover photography
