= I Am the Phoenix =

Studio album by Judie Tzuke
- Released: May 1981
- Studio: Ridge Farm Studio, Rusper, Surrey; The Manor, Shipton-on-Cherwell, Oxfordshire, England
- Genre: Pop rock
- Length: 43:00
- Label: Rocket
- Producer: Paul Muggleton

Judie Tzuke chronology
Sports Car (1980)	I Am the Phoenix (1981)	Shoot the Moon (1982)

Singles from I Am the Phoenix
- 1. "I Never Know Where My Heart Is" / "You Were the Place" Released: 1981; 2. "Higher and Higher" / "City of Swimming Pools" Released: 1981

Alternative cover

Big Moon Records 2000 reissue cover

I Am the Phoenix is the title of the third album by the British singer-songwriter Judie Tzuke, released in 1981. It peaked at no.17 on the UK Album Chart.

Originally released on vinyl and cassette by Elton John's record label named The Rocket Record Company, the album was reissued on CD in 2000 by Tzuke's own record company, Big Moon Records, with new cover artwork.

== Track listing ==
Side one

1. "Black Furs" (Judie Tzuke, Mike Paxman) – 4:30
2. "Higher and Higher" (Paul Muggleton, Bob Noble) – 4:35
3. "Fate's Wheels" (Muggleton, Noble) – 4:59
4. "Come Hell or Waters High" (Muggleton) – 3:14
5. "You Were the Place" (Tzuke, Paxman) – 4:58

Side two

6. "City of Swimming Pools" (Tzuke, Paxman) – 5:39
7. "You Are the Phoenix" (Muggleton, Noble) – 4:39
8. "The Flesh Is Weak" (John Edwards, Muggleton, Noble, Paxman, Jeff Rich, Tzuke) – 5:10
9. "I Never Know Where My Heart Is" (Tzuke, Paxman, Muggleton) – 5:16

== Personnel ==
Band members

- Judie Tzuke – vocals
- Mike Paxman – guitars
- Bob Noble – keyboards
- John Edwards – bass
- Charlie Morgan – drums
- Jeff Rich – drums on tracks 5, 6, 8, 9
- Paul Muggleton – background vocals, producer

Additional musicians

- Andy Clark – additional keyboards, synthesizer arrangement on "Come Hell or Waters High"
- Martin Ditcham – percussion
- Eugene Organ, Mike Rogers – acoustic guitars
- Paul Buckmaster – string arrangements
- Gavyn Wright – strings leader

Production

- Steve Taylor – engineer
- Howard Gray – assistant engineer
- Keith McEwan – art direction, illustration
