= Road Noise =

Road Noise / The Official Bootleg
- Cover design by John Pasche

Live album by Judie Tzuke
- Released: 22 October 1982
- Recorded: Hammersmith Odeon, London, 24 and 25 May 1982; Glastonbury Festival, 20 June 1982
- Genre: Pop rock
- Length: 81:11
- Label: Chrysalis
- Producer: Paul Muggleton

Judie Tzuke chronology
Shoot the Moon (1982)	Road Noise / The Official Bootleg (1982)	Ritmo (1983)

Professional ratings
Review scores
Source	Rating
AllMusic	3.5/5 stars

Road Noise / The Official Bootleg is the title of the first live album by singer-songwriter Judie Tzuke, released on 22 October 1982. It was recorded at the Hammersmith Odeon in London on the 24 and 25 May 1982 and at Glastonbury Festival on 20 June 1982.

The album peaked at no.39 on the UK Album Chart.

== Track listing ==
All tracks composed by Judie Tzuke and Mike Paxman; except where indicated

Side one

1. "Heaven Can Wait" / "Chinatown" – 8:55
2. "I'm Not a Loser" (Bob Noble, Paul Muggleton) – 3:58
3. "Information" – 3:20

Side two

4. "You Are the Phoenix" (Noble, Muggleton) – 4:08
5. "The Flesh Is Weak" (Tzuke, Noble, Jeff Rich, John Edwards, Paxman, Muggleton) – 4:12
6. "Sportscar" – 6:05
7. "For You" – 4:25
8. "Come Hell or Waters High" (Muggleton) – 3:53

Side three

1. "Southern Smiles" / "Katiera Island" – 12:50
2. "Love on the Border" (Paxman, Muggleton) – 3:57
3. "Black Furs" – 4:33

Side four

4. "City of Swimming Pools" – 5:10
5. "Bring the Rain" – 3:42
6. "Sukarita" – 3:28
7. "Stay with Me till Dawn" – 4:10
8. "The Hunter" (Al Jackson Jr., Booker T. Jones, Carl Wells) - 4:25

== Personnel ==
Band members

- Judie Tzuke – vocals
- Mike Paxman – guitars, backing vocals
- Paul Muggleton – guitar, percussion, backing vocals, producer
- Bob Noble – keyboards, backing vocals
- John "Rhino" Edwards – bass, backing vocals
- Jeff Rich – drums

Production

- John Hudson – engineer
- Andy Canelle – assistant engineer
- Jeff Titmus – sound and recording supervisor
- Additional material recorded live at "The Regal", Hitchin, Hertfordshire
- Re-mixed at Mayfair Studios, London
