= Songs 2 =

Songs 2 may refer to:

- Songs 2 (Rich Mullins album), 1999
- Songs 2 (Judie Tzuke album), 2008

== See also ==
- "Song 2", a 1997 song by Blur
- Song of Songs 2, or Song 2, the second chapter in the biblical book Song of Songs
