= The Cat Is Out =

- Cover photography by Brian Aris

Studio album by Judie Tzuke
- Released: June 1985
- Studios: The Boiler Room, Weybridge, Surrey; Mayfair Studios, London
- Genre: Pop rock
- Length: 44:41
- Label: Legacy Records
- Producers: Paul Muggleton, Mike Paxman, Bob Noble

Judie Tzuke chronology
Ritmo (1983)	The Cat Is Out (1985)	Turning Stones (1989)

Singles from The Cat Is Out
- 1. "You" Released: 1984; 2. "I'll Be the One" Released: 1985; 3. "Love Like Fire" Released: 1985; 4. "This Side of Heaven" Released: 1985

Professional ratings
Review scores
Source	Rating
AllMusic	3/5 stars

The Cat Is Out is the title of the sixth studio album by the British singer-songwriter Judie Tzuke, released in June 1985.

Four singles were released from the album: "You" (UK #92), "I'll Be The One" (UK #97), "Love Like Fire" and "This Side of Heaven". The album itself peaked at no. 35 in the UK.

== Track listing ==
Side one

1. "How Sweet It Is" (Mike Paxman, Judie Tzuke) – 4:42
2. "Who Do You Really Love?" (Paul Muggleton, Bob Noble) – 4:35
3. "Love Like Fire" (Tzuke, Paxman) – 4:14
4. "I'll Be the One" (Muggleton, Noble) – 5:01
5. "Girl Without a Name" (Muggleton, Noble) – 3:58

Side two

6. "This Side of Heaven" (Paxman, Muggleton) – 5:30
7. "Harbour Lights" (Paxman, Tzuke) – 5:40
8. "You" (Ivy Jo Hunter, Jack Goga, Jeffrey Bowen) – 4:05
9. "Falling" (Tzuke, Paxman) – 3:34
10. "Racing Against Time" (Tzuke, Paxman, Muggleton) – 3:22

== Personnel ==
Band members

- Judie Tzuke – vocals
- Mike Paxman – guitars, synths, backing vocals, producer
- Bob Noble – keyboards, producer
- Paul Muggleton – guitars, backing vocals, producer
- John "Rhino" Edwards – bass

Additional musicians

- Andy Newmark – drums
- Andy Hamilton – saxophone
- Nigel Kennedy – violin
- Jaqi Robinson, Diane Wright – backing vocals

Production

- Leigh Mantle – engineer, mixing
- Bob Parr – engineer on track 8
- John Hudson – mixing on track 8
- Aaron Chakraverty – mastering
- Brian Aris – cover photography
