= Sports Car (album) =

Studio album by Judie Tzuke
- Released: May 1980
- Recorded: February 1980
- Studio: The Manor, Shipton-on-Cherwell, Oxfordshire, England
- Genre: Pop rock
- Length: 38:05
- Label: Rocket
- Producer: Paul Muggleton, Mike Paxman, Judie Tzuke

Judie Tzuke chronology
| Welcome to the Cruise (1979) | Sports Car (1980) | I Am the Phoenix (1981) |

Singles from Sports Car
- 1. "The Choices You've Made" / "Ladies Night" Released: 1980; 2. "Understanding" / "It's the Night" Released: 1980

Professional ratings
Review scores
| Source | Rating |
|---|---|
| Smash Hits | 7½/10 |

Sports Car is the second album by the British singer-songwriter Judie Tzuke, released in 1980. The album peaked at no.7 in the UK, Tzuke's only Top Ten record and highest ever chart position. It was certified Silver in 1981 by the British Phonographic Industry for sales in excess of 60,000 copies.

Initially released on vinyl album and cassette by The Rocket Record Company, Sports Car was reissued on CD in 2000 by Tzuke's own record company, Big Moon Records.

== Track listing ==
All tracks composed by Judie Tzuke and Mike Paxman, except "Rain on the Hills" by Tzuke, Paxman and Paul Muggleton

Side one

1. "Sports Car" – 5:42
2. "Nightline" – 3:30
3. "Chinatown" – 4:41
4. "Understanding" – 3:40

Side two

5. "The Choices You've Made" – 4:08
6. "The Rise of Heart" – 4:50
7. "Living on the Coast" – 4:51
8. "Molly" – 3:04
9. "Rain on the Hills" – 3:30

== Personnel ==
Band members

- Judie Tzuke – vocals, producer
- Mike Paxman – guitar, producer
- Bob Noble – keyboards
- John "Rhino" Edwards – bass
- Jeff Rich – drums
- Paul Muggleton – backing vocals, arrangements, producer

Production

- Paul Hart – arrangements on tracks 3, 5, 7 and 8
- Steve Taylor – engineer, mixing
- Steve Prestage, Alan Douglas, Nick Thomas, Richard Manwaring – assistant engineers
- Chalkie Davies – cover photography

== Charts ==
| Chart (1980) | Peak position |
|---|---|
| Australia (Kent Music Report) | 67 |
| United Kingdom (Official Charts Company) | 7 |
