= Under the Influence (Status Quo album) =

Studio album by Status Quo
- Released: 29 March 1999
- Recorded: 1998–1999
- Studio: Chipping Norton (Oxfordshire, England); ARSIS Studios
- Genre: Rock, hard rock, boogie rock
- Length: 48:30
- Label: Eagle Music
- Producer: Mike Paxman

Status Quo chronology
| Whatever You Want – The Very Best of Status Quo (1997) | Under the Influence (1999) | Famous in the Last Century (2000) |

Professional ratings
Review scores
| Source | Rating |
|---|---|
| Allmusic | link |

Under the Influence is the twenty-third studio album by British rock band Status Quo, released in 1999.

To date it is the last album featuring new songs written by Francis Rossi together with Bernie Frost, as Rossi re-established his 1970s songwriting partnership with Bob Young afterwards.

== Track listing ==
1. "Twenty Wild Horses" (Francis Rossi, Bernie Frost) 5:00
2. "Under the Influence" (Francis Rossi, Bernie Frost) 4:03
3. "Round and Round" (Andy Bown, John Edwards) 3:26
4. "Shine On" (Rick Parfitt, John Edwards) 4:49
5. "Little White Lies" (Rick Parfitt) 4:20
6. "Keep 'Em Coming" (Andy Bown) 3:26
7. "Little Me and You" (Andy Bown) 3:49
8. "Making Waves" (Francis Rossi, Bernie Frost) 3:56
9. "Blessed are the Meek" (Francis Rossi, Bernie Frost) 4:19
10. "Roll the Dice" (Francis Rossi, Bernie Frost) 4:05
11. "Not Fade Away" (Norman Petty, Charles Hardin) 3:09
12. "The Way It Goes" (Francis Rossi, Bernie Frost) 4:02

=== 2017 remaster bonus tracks ===
- "Sea Cruise" (Huey Smith) 3:11 [B-Side of "The Way It Goes"]
- "I Knew the Bride" (Nick Lowe) 3:32 - (Nick Lowe) [B-Side of "Little White Lies"]
- "Twenty Wild Horses" (Live at Night of the Proms, Antwerp 1999)
- "Pictures of Matchstick Men 1999" (Francis Rossi) 3:25 (Re-recorded version) [B-Side of "Little White Lies"]

The original Australian edition included "Sea Cruise" and "Pictures of Matchstick Men 1999". The 2006 Eurotrend budget label reissue ("Influence of Matchstick Men") includes "Pictures of Matchstick Men", while the Dutch reissue from the same year also adds "Sea Cruise" and "I Knew the Bride". "Twenty Wild Horses" (Live) was included on the 2011 Fourth Chord/earmusic remaster (with the originally intended "bent fork" cover artwork), which also has "Sea Cruise" and "I Knew the Bride", but not "Pictures of Matchstick Men". Finally, the 2017 Edsel Records and 2021 earmusic reissues (which revert to the original "pub sign" cover), have all four bonus tracks.

== Personnel ==
Status Quo

- Francis Rossi – vocals, lead guitar
- Rick Parfitt – vocals, guitar
- John Edwards – bass, guitar, backing vocals
- Andy Bown – keyboards, guitars, backing vocals
- Jeff Rich – drums, percussion

Recorded at Chippington Studios, "Little White Lies" recorded at Big Ocean Studios and "Blessed Are The Meek" recorded At ARSIS Studios.

== Charts ==
| Chart (1999) | Peak position |
|---|---|
| Dutch Albums (Album Top 100) | 81 |
| German Albums (Offizielle Top 100) | 56 |
| Scottish Albums (OCC) | 39 |
| Swiss Albums (Schweizer Hitparade) | 28 |
| UK Albums (OCC) | 26 |
| UK Rock & Metal Albums (OCC) | 1 |
