= Turning Stones =

Studio album by Judie Tzuke
- Released: 17 April 1989
- Recorded: The Tango Hut, Weybridge, Surrey
- Genre: Pop rock
- Length: 47:44
- Label: Polydor
- Producer: Mike Paxman, Paul Muggleton

Judie Tzuke chronology
| The Cat Is Out (1985) | Turning Stones (1989) | Left Hand Talking (1991) |

Singles from Turning Stones
- 1. "We'll Go Dreaming" Released: 1989; 2. "Let Me Be the Pearl" Released: 1989

Turning Stones is the title of the seventh album by the British singer-songwriter Judie Tzuke, released in April 1989. It peaked at no.57 on the UK Albums Chart and was Tzuke's last album to reach the UK Top 100 until 2018 when her collaboration with Beverley Craven and Julia Fordham, Woman to Woman, reached no.42 on the chart.

Turning Stones was Tzuke's only album to be released by Polydor Records. Disagreements between her and the label affected her subsequent 1989 concert tour which was cancelled at the last moment, and she left the label soon afterwards.

The album includes the single "We'll Go Dreaming", which peaked at no.96 on the UK Singles Chart, Tzuke's last single to chart to date.

== Track listing ==
Side one

1. "We'll Go Dreaming" (Judie Tzuke, Mike Paxman, Paul Muggleton) – 4:45
2. "Let Me Be the Pearl" (Tzuke, Paxman) – 5:50
3. "Dominique" (Tzuke, Noble) – 5:05
4. "Take It All" (Tzuke, Paxman, Muggleton) – 5:16
5. "Sound of My Sisters Tears" (Tzuke, Paxman) – 4:45

Side two

6. "Run to Win" (Tzuke, Paxman, Muggleton) – 4:37
7. "Don't Go" (Tzuke, Noble) – 4:50
8. "Everything Will Come" (Muggleton, Noble) – 4:20
9. "Modern Killers" (Paxman, Muggleton) – 5:10
10. "Turning Stones" (Tzuke, Paxman, Muggleton) – 3:10

CD edition bonus track

11. "All They Can Do Is Talk" (Tzuke, Paxman) – 4:33

== Personnel ==
Band members

- Judie Tzuke – vocals
- Mike Paxman – guitars, keyboards, programming, producer, engineer
- Paul Muggleton – guitars, keyboards, programming, producer, engineer
- Bob Noble – keyboards

Additional musicians

- Nigel Kennedy – violins
- Andy Sheppard – saxophone
- John Giblin – bass

Production

- Mike Silverston – additional engineering
- Stephen W Tayler – mixing
- Derek A. Murphy – mixing assistant
