= Shoot the Moon (Judie Tzuke album) =

Album by Judie Tzuke

- Cover design by John Pasche

Studio album by Judie Tzuke
- Released: 9 April 1982
- Studios: Rockfield Studios, Monmouth, Wales; Ramport Studios and Odyssey Studios, London
- Genre: Pop rock
- Length: 38:54
- Label: Chrysalis
- Producer: Paul Muggleton

Judie Tzuke chronology
I Am the Phoenix (1981)	Shoot the Moon (1982)	Road Noise (1982)

Singles from Shoot the Moon
- 1. "Love on the Border" / "Sold a Rose" Released: 1982; 2. "I'm Not a Loser" / "Run on Luck" Released: 1982; 3. "Late Again" / "Water in Motion" Released: 1982

Shoot the Moon is the fourth album to be recorded by English singer-songwriter Judie Tzuke. It was released on 9 April 1982 and was Tzuke's first album for Chrysalis Records after leaving Elton John's label The Rocket Record Company, which released her first three albums. The album peaked at number 19 on the UK Album Chart.

According to Charles Donovan of Popmatters, Shoot the Moon "elaborates on some of the musical and lyrical themes of her first three albums". He called the introduction of "Heaven Can Wait" dreamlike and syncopated, and "Love on the Border" energetic, and said the sequencing of the album's first three tracks makes it "so gripping". Donovan chose the "pithy observational song" "Liggers at Your Funeral" and the "understated ballad" "Late Again" as some of the album's highlights.

== Track listing ==
All songs by Mike Paxman and Judie Tzuke, except where indicated

Side one

1. "Heaven Can Wait" – 4:32
2. "Love on the Border" (Paxman, Paul Muggleton) – 3:14
3. "Information" – 3:07
4. "Beacon Hill" – 3:57
5. "Don't Let Me Sleep" – 3:30

Side two

6. "I'm Not a Loser" (Muggleton, Bob Noble) – 3:28
7. "Now There Is No Love at All" – 4:08
8. "Late Again" (Noble, Tzuke) – 3:14
9. "Liggers at Your Funeral" – 5:32
10. "Water in Motion" – 3:34
11. "Shoot the Moon" – 0:38

2006 Remastered CD bonus tracks

12. "Sold a Rose" – 4:11
13. "Run on Luck" – 3:34
14. "I'm Not a Loser" (Demo) – 3:24
15. "How Do I Feel" (Demo) – 3:58

== Personnel ==
Band members

- Judie Tzuke – vocals, backing vocals
- Mike Paxman – guitar
- Bob Noble – keyboards
- Paul Muggleton – accidental guitar, producer
- John "Rhino" Edwards – bass guitar
- Charlie Morgan – drums, percussion

Additional musicians

- Jeff Rich – drums on "I'm Not a Loser"
- Don Snow, Andy Clark – additional keyboards
- The Dribble Brothers – male backing vocals

Production

- Jeff Titmus – engineer, mixing
