= Robert Miller (bassist) =

- Born: July 13, 1951 (age 75); New York City, United States
- Musical career
- Genres: Jazz, Rock Latin
- Occupations: bassist, songwriter vocalist

Robert Miller (born July 13, 1951) is an American musician, songwriter, podcaster and author. Miller is the band leader and the bassist, composer and a vocalist for the jazz-rock-latin fusion band Project Grand Slam.

== Life and career ==
Miller was born and raised in New York City by his parents. His father was also a musician and played the trumpet. Miller has one younger brother.

Miller graduated from Martin Van Buren High School (NYC) in 1968 and from Boston University in 1972 with a degree in Broadcasting and Film.

Miller's dream was to be a full time musician. He began playing piano at age 5, then switched to the trumpet, then taught himself guitar and bass as a teenager. At 19 he briefly studied the bass with Jimmy Garrison, John Coltrane’s bassist.

Miller returned to Boston in 1971 and began playing at all the local clubs and concert venues with his jazz-rock band Sagov while also working at WGBH, the public television station.

In order to support himself and his family he studied law and then practiced law and investment banking. It was only when he was in his 60s that he transitioned into a full time music career

In 1994 Miller recorded his first album, Child’s Play, and formed The Robert Miller Group. The band played at a number of clubs in NYC including the Blue Note and Birdland and at several festivals including the Telluride Jazz Festival.

In 2007, he founded the jazz-rock-latin fusion band Project Grand Slam. Miller leads the band and is also the band’s bassist and songwriter. In the same year Miller and the band had a featured role, including five of their songs, in an episode of NBC's Lipstick Jungle (TV series) starring Brooke Shields.

In 2015, Miller transitioned the band to include mainly his original vocal songs. Project Grand Slam has released 11 albums including a Billboard #1 (Trippin’ 2018).

The Shakespeare Concert was released in March 2022. It features 15 songs recorded 'live in the studio' without any overdubs or fixes. The album has received praise from a number of musicians including Mark Farner (Grand Funk Railroad), Jim Peterik (Ides Of March), Joey Dee (Peppermint Twist), Elliott Randall (Steely Dan) and Sarah Class (noted British composer.

The band’s 5-song EP, “Live At SteelStacks”, was released in October 2022. The EP was recorded at the SteelStacks venue in Bethlehem, PA. The EP has been praised by Tony Carey (producer for Joe Cocker, Eric Burden and John Mayall), Elliott Randall (Steely Dan), Alan Hewitt (Moody Blues), Melody Maker and Hollywood Digest.

On each album one of Miller's musical signatures is to take a popular song from the British Invasion era of the 1960s and reimagine it completely in PGS's style. He has done this with songs by Cream, The Who, The Kinks, Jimi Hendrix and The Beatles.

Project Grand Slam has millions of video views and streams, and 50,000+ Facebook fans. Miller and the band have also shared the stage with other musicians over the years including Edgar Winter, Blues Traveler, Boney James and Mindi Abair.

Miller released his first solo album called Summer Of Love in 2020. His second solo album called Miller Rocks was released song by song in 2021 via his podcast, Follow Your Dream.

In March 2021, Miller started hosting a podcast called Follow Your Dream, with the goal of motivating others to pursue their dreams. The podcast currently is ranked in the Top 1% and has listeners in 200 countries, and has featured musicians, authors, broadcasters, actors and others as guests.

In August 2021, Miller released the Follow Your Dream Handbook to accompany the podcast. The handbook presents his own autobiographical account and experiences and is a step by step how-to. The Handbook immediately became an Amazon #1 Bestseller.
