= Twenty Wild Horses =

Single by Status Quo

from the album Under the Influence
- Released: 20 September 1999
- Genre: Rock, folk rock
- Length: 3:53 (5:00 album version)
- Label: Eagle Records
- Songwriter(s): Rossi/Frost
- Producer(s): Mike Paxman

Status Quo singles chronology
"Little White Lies" (1999)	"Twenty Wild Horses" (1999)	"Mony Mony" (2000)

"Twenty Wild Horses" is a single released by the British Rock band Status Quo in 1999. It was included on the album Under the Influence. The song also entered in Francis Rossi's solo repertoire, along with another song from the same album, "Blessed Are the Meek"; the two songs were included on Rossi's 2011 live album. Rossi described the song's phrase "twenty wild horses and 500 men" as sounding incredibly good, and as the melody was saying there's a sound in it.

== Track listing ==
1. "Twenty Wild Horses" (Edit) (Rossi/Frost) (3.53)
2. "Analyse Time" (Rossi/Bown) (3.37)
3. "Obstruction Day" (Parfitt/Edwards) (3.48)

== Charts ==
Chart (1999)	Peak position
Netherlands (Single Top 100)	96
UK Singles (OCC)	53

== Other versions ==
The Mexican band Pobre Barrio released a spanish language version of the song, under the name "Toda la Noche", as part of their album "Sueños y Realidades" (2002).
