= Left Hand Talking =

Studio album by Judie Tzuke
- Released: 1991
- Recorded: Big Ocean Studios, Surrey and Metropolis Studios, London
- Genre: Pop rock
- Length: 39:06
- Label: Columbia
- Producer: Mike Paxman, Paul Muggleton

Judie Tzuke chronology
Turning Stones (1989)	Left Hand Talking (1991)	Wonderland (1992)

Singles from Left Hand Talking
- 1. "God Only Knows" Released: 1990; 2. "Outlaws" Released: 1991

Left Hand Talking is the eighth studio album by the British singer-songwriter Judie Tzuke, released in 1991.

Despite considerable promotion and featuring a re-recording of her best known song, "Stay with Me till Dawn", the album failed to chart. It was the last of Tzuke's albums to be released by a major record label. Her next album, Wonderland, was released on an independent label, and all subsequent albums have been released on her own home label, Big Moon Records.

== Track listing ==
Side one

1. "One Day I Will Live in France" (Judie Tzuke, Paul Muggleton, Bob Noble) – 4:25
2. "I Could Feel You" (Muggleton, Noble) – 3:59
3. "Liam" (Tzuke, Noble) – 3:50
4. "Left Hand Talking" (Tzuke) – 4:38
5. "Jesus Was a Cross Maker" (Judee Sill) – 3:35 (Judee Sill cover)

Side two

1. "Stay with Me 'till Dawn" (Tzuke, Mike Paxman) – 3:49
2. "God Only Knows" (Brian Wilson, Tony Asher) – 2:49 (The Beach Boys cover)
3. "Bailey's Song" (Tzuke, Noble) – 3:41
4. "Calling Me Back" (Tzuke) – 4:21
5. "Outlaws" (Tzuke) – 3:59

== Personnel ==
Band members

- Judie Tzuke – lead and backing vocals, keyboards
- Mike Paxman – guitar, keyboards, percussion, producer, engineer
- Bob Noble – keyboards
- John Giblin – bass guitar, fretless bass on track 8
- Charlie Morgan – drums, percussion
- Paul Muggleton – keyboards, percussion, backing vocals, producer, engineer

Additional musicians

- Don Snow – keyboards, guitar, backing vocals
- Phil Palmer – acoustic and slide guitar on tracks 5, 8
- Andy Chamberlain – keyboards on tracks 5, 7
- Bobby Paterson – bass guitar on track 3
- Andy Sheppard – soprano saxophone on track 4
- Nicolette L'Adventure – backing vocals on track 1

Production

- Matt Howe, Heidi Cannavo, Craig Sullivan – assistant engineers
- Stephen W Tayler – mixing

== See also ==
- Thomas Anders – Whispers (1991)
