= Turn Me On =

Turn Me On may refer to:

== Albums ==
- Turn Me On (album), by the Honeymoon Killers, 1988
- Turn Me On (BT EP), 1999
- Turn Me On (Kim Kyu-jong EP), 2011

== Songs ==
- "Turn Me On" (David Guetta song), 2012
- "Turn Me On" (Kevin Lyttle song), 2003
- "Turn Me On" (Mark Dinning song), 1961; covered by Nina Simone (1967) and Norah Jones (2000)
- "Turn Me On" (Riton and Oliver Heldens song), 2019
- "Turn Me On" (Sean Smith song), 2016
- "Turn Me On (Turn Me Out)", by Praxis (as "Turn Me Out"), 1994; covered by 2 Shoes (2012)
- "Turn Me On", by Accept from Balls to the Wall, 1983
- "Turn Me On", by Bad Gyal from Slow Wine Mixtape, 2016
- "Turn Me On", by Band-Maid from World Domination, 2018
- "Turn Me On", by the Fray from Scars & Stories, 2012
- "Turn Me On", by James Blunt from Some Kind of Trouble, 2010
- "Turn Me On", by Snoop Dogg from I Wanna Thank Me, 2019
- "Turn Me On", by Third Eye Blind from Screamer, 2019
- "Turn Me On", by Vitamin C from Vitamin C, 1999

== Other uses ==
- Turn Me On (film), an upcoming film directed by Michael Tyburski
- Turn Me On, a 2007 book by Cherie Bennett
- Turn me on, another word for sexually aroused

== See also ==
- Provócame (Spanish: Turn Me On), an album by Chayanne, 1992
- Turn Me On, Dammit!, a 2011 Norwegian film
