= Stay with Me till Dawn =

Single by Judie Tzuke

from the album Welcome to the Cruise
- Released: 15 June 1979
- Recorded: 1977
- Genre: Soft rock
- Length: 3:54
- Label: Rocket Records
- Songwriters: Judie Tzuke; Mike Paxman
- Producer: John Punter

Judie Tzuke singles chronology
"For You" (1978)	"Stay with Me till Dawn" (1979)	"Living on the Coast" (1980)

"Stay with Me till Dawn" is a 1979 single by Judie Tzuke from her debut album Welcome to the Cruise. Written by Tzuke and Mike Paxman and produced by John Punter, the song was Tzuke's only Australian and UK top 40 single, charting at number 8 and 16 respectively.

== Background ==
"Stay with Me till Dawn" was co-written by Mike Paxman, whom Tzuke had met in 1975 and had released a Tony Visconti-produced single called "These Are the Laws" (as "Tzuke and Paxo") on Visconti's label, Good Earth Records. In 1977, Tzuke saw Rocket Records (Elton John's label)' David Croker, played him a few songs including "Stay with Me till Dawn" and was promptly signed by the label. The pair proceeded to spend around six months or so recording her début album at Air Studios in London and "Stay with Me till Dawn"'s John Punter-produced parent album Welcome to the Cruise.

The song charted at number 16 on the UK Singles Chart, and Tzuke appeared on Top of the Pops on 12 July, 26 July and 9 August 1979 to promote the track. All four of her subsequent chart entries failed to peak higher than number 92 on the UK Singles Chart, rendering her a one-hit wonder.

The song was re-recorded for her 1991 album Left Hand Talking; the album came out on Columbia Records, and it would not be until December 1999 that Elton John would return the copyrights of the albums she released on his label. In 2002, "Stay with Me till Dawn" was chosen by the British public as the thirty-ninth best song to have come out of Britain over the previous fifty years (between 1952 and 2002). The song has also appeared on the live albums Road Noise, and Over the Moon and on the compilation album Seventies Power Ballads. In addition, Mylo sampled the track for the song "Need You Tonite" from his debut album Destroy Rock & Roll.

== Charts ==
=== Weekly charts ===
Weekly chart performance for "Stay with Me till Dawn"
Chart (1979–1980)	Peak position
Australia (Kent Music Report)	8
UK Singles (OCC)	16
US Billboard Adult Contemporary	47

=== Year-end charts ===
Year-end chart performance for "Stay with Me till Dawn"
Chart (1980)	Position
Australia (Kent Music Report)	70

== Lucid version ==
In September 1999, UK house music duo Lucid released a cover of "Stay with Me till Dawn" with Clare Canty providing the vocals. It peaked at No. 25 on the UK Singles Chart in October 1999, and remained on the chart for two weeks.

=== Track listing ===
UK CD single

1. "Stay with Me till Dawn" (Lucid's Radio Edit) - 4:08
2. "Stay with Me till Dawn" (Translucid Remix) - 6:48
3. "99°F" - 6:49
