= Woman to Woman (Beverley Craven song) =

Single by Beverley Craven

from the album Beverley Craven
- Released: 1990 (UK)
- Recorded: 1989
- Genre: Pop
- Length: 4:10
- Label: Epic (US); CBS (UK)
- Songwriter: Beverley Craven
- Producer: Paul Samwell-Smith

Beverley Craven singles chronology
"Joey" (1990)	"Woman to Woman" (1990)	"Holding On" (1990)

"Woman to Woman" is a song by British singer-songwriter Beverley Craven, included on her self-titled debut album (1990). It was produced by Paul Samwell-Smith and released as the album's third single in late 1990. As with the previous singles, it failed to chart in the UK. However, after the success of the single "Promise Me", the single was re-released, with a new cover art, in September 1991. This time it peaked at number 40 in the UK charts.

The song's lyrics talk about a friend who ignores her friendships once she falls in love. As with most of her lyrics, Craven took inspiration from her real-life experiences, and in concerts has revealed that the subject of this song is her friend Alison Goldfrapp. "Woman to Woman" is one of the few uptempo cuts from her debut album, and features a harmonica solo by Frank Mead.

The song was featured as part of a tour of the United Kingdom in 2018 by Craven and singers Judie Tzuke and Julia Fordham, and was the title track of an album released by the trio.

== Charts ==
Chart (1990)	Peak position
Ireland (IRMA)	28

Chart (1991)	Peak position
Europe (European Hit Radio)	34
Germany (Official German Charts)	55
UK Singles (OCC)	40
UK Airplay (Music Week)	18

== Release history ==
Region	Date	Label	Version
United Kingdom	1990	CBS	Original
United Kingdom	September 1991	CBS	Re-issue
