= We'll Go Dreaming =

1989 song by Judie Tzuke

Single by Judie Tzuke

from the album Turning Stones
- B-side: "Everything Will Come"
- Released: 20 February 1989
- Length: 4:45 (album version); 4:35 (single version); 7:29 (12-inch remix)
- Label: Polydor
- Songwriters: Judie Tzuke; Mike Paxman; Paul Muggleton
- Producers: Mike Paxman; Paul Muggleton

Judie Tzuke singles chronology
"How Sweet It Is" (1985)	"We'll Go Dreaming" (1989)	"Let Me Be the Pearl" (1989)

"We'll Go Dreaming" is a song by English singer-songwriter Judie Tzuke, released in 1989 as the lead single from her seventh studio album Turning Stones. The song was written by Tzuke, Mike Paxman and Paul Muggleton, and was produced by Paxman and Muggleton. It peaked at number 96 in the UK Singles Chart and remained in the top 100 for two weeks.

== Background ==
"We'll Go Dreaming" was Tzuke's first single release since 1985 and her debut release on the Polydor label. It reached number 96 in the UK Singles Chart but suffered commercially after failing to achieve airplay on BBC Radio 1 and other UK radio stations. Speaking to the Liverpool Echo in 1989, Tzuke said of the song, "It's about getting away from the reality of everything."

== Music video ==
A music video was filmed to promote the single. In an interview, Tzuke revealed, "I was very nervous making the video. I hope it doesn't show but there's one shot which makes me look like Kylie Minogue for grown-ups!"

== Critical reception ==
Upon its release, Ian Russell of The Kilmarnock Standard praised "We'll Go Dreaming" as having "all the hallmarks of a classic Tzuke record – unique vocals and a rich, atmospheric production". Julian Baggini of the Reading Evening Post considered it to be a "very powerful and dramatic dance song" which "firmly lodges itself in your mind" and "has a lot of chart potential".

Bob Eborall of the Hammersmith & Fulham Independent described it as a "strong, beaty ballad" which "should make people take notice". Ian Forsyth of The Press and Journal gave the single a three out of five star rating. He considered it to be a "lively number" and "reminiscent of the recent offerings by Heart and Pat Benatar". He added, "One complaint would be that she doesn't seem to have developed much over the years. She was producing records just like this around five years ago."

== Track listing ==
7–inch single (UK)

1. "We'll Go Dreaming" (Single Version) – 4:35
2. "Everything Will Come" – 4:14

12–inch single (UK)

1. "We'll Go Dreaming" (Remix) – 7:29
2. "Everything Will Come" – 4:14
3. "Dangerous Toys" – 4:23

12–inch promotional single (UK)

1. "We'll Go Dreaming" (Dance Remix) – 7:29
2. "We'll Go Dreaming" (Dub Mix) – 4:00

CD single (UK)

1. "We'll Go Dreaming" (Single Version) – 4:35
2. "Everything Will Come" – 4:14
3. "Dangerous Toys" – 4:23
4. "We'll Go Dreaming" (Remix) – 7:29

== Personnel ==
Production

- Mike Paxman – producer (all tracks)
- Paul Muggleton – producer (all tracks)
- Stephen W. Tayler – mixing on "We'll Go Dreaming"
- Jay Burnett – remix and additional production on "We'll Go Dreaming" (Remix)

Other

- Accident – design

== Charts ==
Chart (1989)	Peak position
UK Singles (Official Charts)	96

== Cover versions ==
In 1999, American musician BT released a version titled "Dreaming", featuring English singer Kirsty Hawkshaw on vocals, on his third studio album Movement in Still Life. It was released as a single in 2000, reaching number 38 on the UK Singles Chart and number 5 on the US Billboard Hot Dance Music Club Play chart.
