= The Way It Goes =

Single by Status Quo

from the album Under the Influence
- Released: 8 March 1999
- Genre: Rock
- Length: 3:20
- Label: Eagle Records
- Songwriter(s): Rossi/Frost
- Producer(s): Mike Paxman

Status Quo singles chronology
"All Around My Hat" (1996)	"The Way It Goes" (1999)	"Little White Lies" (1999)

"The Way It Goes" is a single released by the British Rock band Status Quo in 1999. It was included on the album Under the Influence.

The Under the Influence trailer has segments of "Twenty Wild Horses", "Under the Influence", "Round And Round", "Little White Lies" and "Keep 'Em Coming. The track "Sea Cruise" was written and originally recorded by Huey Smith. A second version of the single was planned but canceled, replacing "Sea Cruise" with a cover of "I Knew the Bride" (a cover of Dave Edmunds 1977 hit).

== Track listing ==
1. "The Way It Goes"(edit) (Rossi/Frost) (3.20)
2. "Sea Cruise" (H Smith)(3.07)
3. "Under the Influence album trailer" (3.45)

== Charts ==
Chart (1999)	Peak position
Netherlands (Single Top 100)	62
UK Singles (OCC)	39
