= Project Grand Slam =

Jazz-rock fusion band from New York City

- Origin: New York City, New York, United States
- Genres: Rock, Jazz, Fusion
- Years active: 2007 - Current
- Label: Cakewalk Records
- Members: Robert Miller - Bass/Composer/Vocals; [Baden Goyo] - Keyboards; [Alex Blade Silver] - Saxophone; [Joel E. Mateo] - Drums; [Tristan Clark] - Guitar; [Guillermo Barron Rios] - Percussion; [Marilyn Castillo] - Singer
- Website: projectgrandslam.com

Project Grand Slam (PGS) is a jazz-rock fusion band with a twist of Classic Rock and Latin from New York City, New York formed in 2007. The band is led by acclaimed bassist/composer Robert Miller. To date, Project Grand Slam has released 15 highly regarded albums including a Billboard #1 (Trippin'), earned millions of video views and millions of streams, performed at festivals and concerts around the world, and shared the stage with Edgar Winter, Blues Traveler, Boney James and Mindi Abair. PGS and five of their songs were also featured in an episode of the NBC-TV series Lipstick Jungle starring Brooke Shields, and Robert has a speaking part.

== History ==
Robert Miller was a staple of the Boston music scene in the 1970ʼs at a time when jazz fusion acts such as Weather Report, Return To Forever, Mahavishnu Orchestra and others were performing. His personal fusion band (which included Anton Fig of David Letterman fame) performed with Gary Burton, Sonny Stitt, and Jaki Byard, among others, and played steadily at all the Boston area clubs.

In the mid 1990ʼs Robert formed The Robert Miller Group. Their first album, “Miles Behind” (1994), contained Robertʼs first original compositions and featured guest artists Al Foster (Miles Davis), Randy Brecker (Brecker Brothers), Tony “Thunder” Smith (Lou Reed), Anton Fig and Jon Lucien. The band went on to record a second album, "Prisoner's Of Love" (1996) and to play at several music festivals including the Telluride Jazz Celebration and the San Bernardino Jazz Festival (alongside Bruce Hornsby, War and Bela Fleck).

In 2007 Robert put together Project Grand Slam in New York City. PGS's first two CDs, “Play” (2008) and “Spring Dance” (2012), had three top radio singles – “The Captain Of Her Heart” (feat. Judie Tzuke on vocals) from Play, and “Catch You Later” and the title song from Spring Dance. In 2009 the band and Robert also had a featured role in an episode of the hit NBC-TV series “Lipstick Jungle” starring Brooke Shields and Kim Raver, with five of Robert's songs featured in the soundtrack and Robert having a speaking part.

In 2015 Robert re-formed PGS with an entirely new lineup of young, mainly foreign born musicians from places like Puerto Rico, Venezuela, Mexico, Canada and the U.S. Over the next years PGS has released at least one new album per year.

“Made In New York” (2015) featured two singles, “New York City Groove”, a song penned by Robert as a celebration of his NYC home, and “Fire”, Robert's reimagined version of the Jimi Hendrix classic. Both singles featured “The Voice” semi-finalist Kat Robichaud on vocals.

"The Queenʼs Carnival" (2016) features nine original tunes written by Robert and his reimagined version of The Kinks’ “You Really Got Me” (feat. Lucy Woodward on vocals). Dave Davies, guitarist and co-founder of The Kinks, has publicly praised PGS’s version of the song. The Official and Live videos of the tracks from this album have been viewed over 500,000 times to date.

"The PGS Experience" (2017), which featured five new original songs by Robert plus live versions of four of the band's most popular songs. Jazziz Magazine called it "A 'must know about' album!"

"Trippin'" (2018) went to #1 on the Billboard Jazz chart. It features 10 new original songs by Robert plus his inspired reimagined version of The Who's "I Can't Explain". The album was named a "Best Of 2018" by The Improper, and noted reviewer Jonathan Widran called it "A truly amazing album.”

"Greetings From Serbia" (2019) contained the band's live set at the 2018 Nisville Jazz Festival. Skopemag called it “An amazingly magnetizing piece of music” while Mobangeles said “This record didn’t live up to any of my expectations – it exceeded them by a healthy mile or so.”

"PGS 7" (2019), a new studio album, contained twelve new songs by Robert plus his inspired rendition of "The 'In' Crowd" by Dobie Gray. This album was called "Magnificent" (Vents Magazine), "Stunning!" (IndiePulse) and "Thrilling!" (IndieMusicReviews).

"East Side Sessions" (2020) features 11 new songs by Robert including what may be the world's first Cowboy Jazz song, "The Pardners", plus "I Wanna Be Your Girl", Robert's female version of The Beatles' "I Wanna Be Your Man". The album has been called "Album Of The Year" by IndieShark.

PGS has provided support for artists such as Blues Traveler, Edgar Winter, Boney James and Scott Weiland (formerly of Stone Temple Pilots), and performed at major venues including the Bergen Performing Arts Center, Ridgefield Playhouse, F.M. Kirby Performing Arts Center, Gramercy Theater, and Garcia’s at The Capitol Theater, while also performing at major clubs including The Blue Note, The Cutting Room, Iridium and a continuing a monthly residency at The Groove and Ashford & Simpson's Sugar Bar.

Robert has been profiled in numerous magazines and websites including Downbeat and Bass Musician.

Robert launched the "Follow Your Dream Podcast" In 2021. The podcast features interviews with musicians and other creative professionals and has attracted an international listener base. It also served as a release platform for new music by Robert and PGS.

== Critical reception ==
- "Project Grand Slam is a spectacular mix of rock, jazz and fusion that combines melody, groove and great improvisation!" – Fusion
- "Robert Miller's Project Grand Slam deserves mentioning as among the best musical acts produced by American culture in the last quarter century!" – Gashouse Radio
- "A very unique version…I am liking it" – Dave Davies of the Kinks on PGS's cover of "You Really Got Me"
- "Stunning reinvention!" – Indie Music Reviews on the Kinks "You Really Got Me"
- "An inspired album…a work of ensemble genius!" – Music Existence on "The Queens Carnival"
- "Smart, stylish and sophisticated!" – Beach Sloth on "The Queens Carnival"

== Selected discography ==
2008 – Play – (Cakewalk Records)

2012 – Spring Dance – (Cakewalk Records)

2015 – Made In New York – w/Kat Robichaud (Cakewalk Records)

2016 – The Queenʼs Carnival – w/Lucy Woodward (Cakewalk Records)

2017 - The PGS Experience

2018 - Trippin'

2019 - Greetings From Serbia

2019 - PGS 7

2020 - East Side Sessions
