= Welcome to the Cruise =

- Cover art by Hipgnosis

Studio album by Judie Tzuke
- Released: May 1979
- Studio: AIR Studios, London
- Genre: Pop rock
- Length: 40:32
- Label: Rocket
- Producer: John Punter, Lem Lubin

Judie Tzuke chronology
Welcome to the Cruise (1979)	Sports Car (1980)

Singles from Welcome to the Cruise
- 1. "For You" / "Sukarita" Released: 1978; 2. "Stay with Me till Dawn" / "New Friends Again" Released: July 1979

Professional ratings
Review scores
Source	Rating
Encyclopedia of Popular Music	5/5 stars
Music Week	3/4 stars
Smash Hits	8/10

Welcome to the Cruise is the debut album by British singer-songwriter Judie Tzuke, released in 1979. The album peaked at No. 14 on the UK Albums Chart and was certified gold in 1981 by the British Phonographic Industry for sales in excess of 100,000 copies.

Recorded and mixed at AIR Studios in London, the album includes the hit single "Stay with Me till Dawn", which peaked at No. 16 in the UK and remains Tzuke's only top 40 hit to date. (The album was also titled Stay with Me till Dawn in the US.) In 2002, "Stay with Me Till Dawn" was chosen by the British public as one of the fifty best British songs 1952–2002 (ranking number 39). In 2004, the song was sampled by Mylo for the track "Need You Tonite", which is taken from his album Destroy Rock & Roll.

The tracks "For You" and "Sukarita" were originally produced by Lem Lubin. "These Are the Laws" was originally a 7" single released under the name of "Tzuke and Paxo" ("Paxo" being Mike Paxman, Tzuke's long-time musical collaborator).

Originally released on vinyl album and cassette by The Rocket Record Company in 1979, and on CD in 1987, the album was reissued on CD in 2000 by Tzuke's own record company, Big Moon Records.

== Track listing ==
All tracks composed by Judie Tzuke and Mike Paxman.

Side one

1. "Welcome to the Cruise" – 4:58
2. "Sukarita" – 3:26
3. "For You" – 2:40
4. "These Are the Laws" – 4:41
5. "Bring the Rain" – 5:05

Side two

6. "Southern Smiles" – 3:51
7. "Katiera Island" – 5:12
8. "Ladies Night" – 4:02
9. "New Friends Again" – 2:42
10. "Stay with Me till Dawn" – 3:55

== Personnel ==
Musicians

- Judie Tzuke – vocals
- Mike Paxman – guitar solos on tracks 1 and 10, acoustic guitar on track 7, percussion on track 4, additional backing vocals on tracks 2, 6 and 9
- Ray Russell – guitar, string and brass arrangements on tracks 1, 4, 7–9
- Chris Parren – keyboards on tracks 1, 4, 6, 7, 9 and 10, piano on track 5
- Paul Hart – keyboards on track 2, string quartet arrangements on track 3
- Mo Foster – bass on tracks 2, 4–7, 9 and 10
- Roy Babbington – bass on track 1, acoustic bass on track 5
- Peter Van Hooke – drums on tracks 4, 6, 7, 9 and 10
- Barry De Souza – drums on tracks 1 and 5
- Simon Phillips – drums on track 2
- John Punter – percussion on tracks 4–6, 9
- Morris Pert – marimba on track 6, percussion on track 7
- Kesh Satche – tabla on track 1
- Ray Warleigh – soprano saxophone on track 7
- Paul Buckmaster – string arrangements on track 5 and 10
- Gavyn Wright – orchestra leader on tracks 1, 4 and 8
- Richard Studt – orchestra leader on tracks 5 and 10
- Steve Nye – piano notes

Production

- John Punter – producer, engineer (vocal parts), mixing
- Lem Lubin – producer on "Sukarita and "For You"
- Steve Nye, Colin Fairley – engineers
- Tim Cuthberson – assistant engineer
- Hipgnosis - sleeve design
- Richard Draper - photography

== Charts ==
Chart (1979/80)	Peak position
Australia (Kent Music Report)	15
United Kingdom (Official Charts Company)	14
