= Holding On (Beverley Craven song) =

Single by Beverley Craven

from the album Beverley Craven
- Released: 1990
- Recorded: 1990
- Genre: Pop
- Length: 3:30
- Label: Epic
- Songwriter: Beverley Craven
- Producer: Paul Samwell-Smith

Beverley Craven singles chronology
"Woman to Woman" (1990)	"Holding On" (1990)	"You're Not the First" (1991)

Alternative cover
- 1991 reissue cover

"Holding On" is a ballad by British singer-songwriter Beverley Craven, released in late 1990 as the fourth single from her debut album, Beverley Craven (1990). This was Craven's first entry in the UK charts, peaking at a low #95 in February 1991. After the success of "Promise Me" in May 1991, "Holding On" was re-released as the follow-up single in July 1991, peaking at #32. The song also hit some European charts, and was also Craven's sole chart entry in the US charts.

"Holding On" was one of three songs Craven recorded first with producer Stewart Levine in America. Not liking the final result, she went on to work with Paul Samwell-Smith, who produced her debut album. Levine's productions of her songs, however, were released as b-sides to her singles, under the label "West Coast Version".

== Critical reception ==
A reviewer from Melody Maker said, "We're talking class here. Real class. Well out of your league. [...] But what a lovely voice. The sort of voice you'd be proud to hear belting out of the Sonys in your Cavalier. She ranks alongside the greats, does Bev—Chris de Burgh, Judie Tzuke, Pavarotti. Lovely." Pan-European magazine Music & Media wrote, "Craven doesn't need to shout her way to the top. But in the end that's where she should be, with a warm voice concentrating on distilling real emotions. Deserves to cross over from its AC basis to a general pop audience." Terry Staunton from NME compared Craven to Joni Mitchell, calling her "the '90s Brit Mitchell" and complimented the song as "well-crafted adult rock".

== Charts ==
Chart (1990)	Peak position
UK Singles (OCC)	95
Netherlands (MegaCharts)	52

Chart (1991)	Peak position
France (SNEP)	37
UK Singles (OCC)	32
UK Airplay (Music Week)	12
US Hot Hot Adult Contemporary (Billboard)	30
