= Change of Heart (Beverley Craven album) =

Studio album by Beverley Craven
- Released: 1 September 2014 (UK)
- Genre: pop
- Label: Craven Songs & Music
- Producer: Beverley Craven

Beverley Craven chronology
Close to Home (2009)	Change of Heart (2014)

Change of Heart is the fifth studio album by British singer Beverley Craven, released on 1 September 2014. The album includes 10 new songs, as well as a newly recorded version of her 1991 single "Memories", originally from her debut album. A vinyl edition was made available only through Craven's website and was limited to 250 copies.

== Track listing ==
1. "You Belong to Someone Else"
2. "No Shame"
3. "Your Life"
4. "Ready to Fall in Love"
5. "You Never Did Love Me"
6. "Just Be the Man"
7. "When to Walk Away"
8. "Love High"
9. "You Should Have Left Me Alone"
10. "All Night"
11. "Memories" (New version)
