= Mixed Emotions (Beverley Craven album) =

Studio album by Beverley Craven
- Released: 1999 (UK)
- Genre: Pop
- Label: Epic
- Producer: Beverley Craven

Beverley Craven chronology
Love Scenes (1993)	Mixed Emotions (1999)	The Very Best of Beverley Craven (2004)

Professional ratings
Review scores
Source	Rating
AllMusic	3/5 stars

Mixed Emotions is the third studio album by Beverley Craven, released in 1999. The album was released after a 5-year hiatus, in which Craven gave birth to two daughters and took time off to take care of her three children.

On this album she did not collaborate with the producer of her previous two albums, Paul Samwell-Smith, and instead Craven fully produced the release.

The lead single, "I Miss You", was released as a promo single and a videoclip was made for it. However, the record label refused to release the single commercially. The album received mixed reviews and it charted at #46 in the UK Albums Chart, staying in the top 75 for two weeks. Craven went on a small tour around the UK to support the album.

No further singles were released from the album, and Craven parted ways with her label Epic Records shortly after. She disappeared from the music scene for ten years before returning in 2009 with her fourth album Close to Home.

Two songs on the album were originally written for film scores, "I Miss You" for the 1996 film The Adventures of Pinocchio, and "We Found a Place" for the 1998 film The Theory of Flight. Both were rejected, however, and not used in the films.

== Single releases ==
- "I Miss You" (Promo single only)
- "We Found a Place" (Polish promo single only)
- "Say You're Sorry" (Polish promo single only)

== Details ==
- Issued on CD, cassette and Mini Disc in 1999 through Epic Records.

== Track listing ==
All tracks written by Beverley Craven.

1. "I Miss You"
2. "Tick Tock"
3. "Come Home to Me"
4. "Move On"
5. "We Found a Place"
6. "Say You're Sorry"
7. "Talk to Me"
8. "She Doesn't Need Saving"
9. "Phoenix from the Fire"
10. "Afraid of Letting Go"

== Personnel ==
=== Musicians ===
- Beverley Craven – vocals, piano, producer, keyboards, backing vocals
- Pino Palladino – bass guitar
- Manu Katché – drums
- Dominic Miller – guitar
- Phil Thornalley – acoustic guitar
- Ian Bairnson – guitar
- Frank Mead – saxophone
- Danny Cummings – percussion
- Gary Sanctuary – keyboards, piano
- Nigel Hine – guitar
- Sid Gauld – trumpet
- John Giblin – bass guitar
- Luis Jardim – percussion
- Nick Payne – saxophone
- Andy Gangadeen – drums

=== Production ===
- Producer – Beverley Craven
- Engineer – Rick Simpson (track 1)
- Engineer – Paul Hicks (track 2)
- Engineer – John Hudson (tracks 3–10)
- Mixed by John Hudson
- Recorded at Mayfair Studios, Abbey Road Studios, RAK Studios
- Design – Greg Jakobek at Warsaw
- Photography – Kim Knott
