= Every Other Way =

Single by BT featuring Jes

from the album These Hopeful Machines
- Released: December 22, 2009
- Recorded: 2009
- Genre: Electronica; trance; progressive trance
- Label: Black Hole
- Songwriter(s): Brian Transeau; Jes Brieden
- Producer(s): Brian Transeau

BT singles chronology
"The Rose of Jericho" (2009)	"Every Other Way" (2009)	"Suddenly" (2010)

Music video
- "Every Other Way" on YouTube

"Every Other Way" is a song by American musician BT featuring Jes, released as the second single from BT's sixth studio album, These Hopeful Machines. It's also the first of two collaborations with singer Jes from the album.

After lengthy negotiations with BT, the song was remixed by PureNRG (Solarstone and Giuseppe Ottaviani), with BT & Jes - Every Other Way (PureNRG Extended Remix) being released December, 2017.

== Track listing ==
"Every Other Way" (featuring Jes)
No.	Title	Length
1.	"Every Other Way" (Radio Edit)	4:04
2.	"Every Other Way" (Josh Gabriel Remix)	9:23
3.	"Every Other Way" (George Acosta Remix)	8:02
4.	"Every Other Way" (Armin van Buuren Remix)	8:15
5.	"Every Other Way" (Phunk Investigation Remix)	9:12
6.	"Every Other Way" (Whelan and Di Scala Remix)	6:35
7.	"Every Other Way" (Steve Southern's DYM Remix)	7:01
8.	"Every Other Way" (Jim Jacobsen Remix)	3:55
9.	"Every Other Way" (Kearley Mix)	6:15
10.	"Every Other Way" (Hammock Re-Interpretation)	10:25
11.	"Every Other Way" (Original Mix)	9:40

== Music video ==
A music video was shot for "Every Other Way" and it features both BT and Jes in the music video. The music video was released on the same day that BT's new website was launched.
