= The Rose of Jericho =

- Part 1 single cover.

Single by BT

from the album These Hopeful Machines
- Released: June 30, 2009 Part 1 June 9, 2009 (Beatport only); June 30, 2009 (Worldwide) (iTunes) Part 2 June 23, 2009
- Recorded: Home studio
- Genre: Electronic; trance; progressive trance
- Length: 7:43
- Label: Nettwerk, Black Hole
- Songwriter: Brian Transeau
- Producer: Brian Transeau

BT singles chronology
"Break My Fall" (2007)	"The Rose of Jericho" (2009)	"Every Other Way" (2009)

"The Rose of Jericho" is an instrumental single by experimental trance musician BT, his first from his sixth studio album, These Hopeful Machines.

== Track listing ==
Rose of Jericho
No.	Title	Music style	Length
1.	"Rose of Jericho (BT’s Deus ex Machina Album Mix)"	Progressive trance	7:43
2.	"Rose of Jericho (Sultan & Ned Shepard Remix)"	Progressive house	10:18
3.	"Rose of Jericho (Adam K & Soha Remix)"	Progressive house	9:19
4.	"Rose of Jericho (Robbie Rivera New Juicy Music Mix)"	Electro house	8:00
5.	"Rose of Jericho (Robbie Rivera Juicy Miami After Hours Remix)"	Electro house	6:32
6.	"Rose of Jericho (Virtual Vault Remix)"	Progressive house	6:24

Rose of Jericho (Part 1)
No.	Title	Music style	Length
1.	"Rose of Jericho (BT’s Deus ex Machina Album Mix)"	Progressive trance	7:43
2.	"Rose of Jericho (Sultan & Ned Shepard Remix)"	Progressive house	10:18
3.	"Rose of Jericho (Robbie Rivera New Juicy Music Mix)"	Electro house	8:00

Rose of Jericho (Part 2)
No.	Title	Music style	Length
1.	"Rose of Jericho (Adam K & Soha Remix)"	Progressive house	9:19
2.	"Rose of Jericho (Virtual Vault Remix)"	Progressive house	6:24
3.	"Rose of Jericho (Robbie Rivera Juicy Miami After Hours Remix)"	Electro house	6:32

== Production and recording ==
The main synth section of "The Rose of Jericho" was created with an Oberheim Four Voice analog synthesizer layered with Native Instruments FM8, later processed through a Stutter Edit plug in he created on Sonik Architects.

"It's been a long time since I've written music that I could feature in one of my Laptop Symphony sets. Not only is this track a floor-filling monster, it really features my current electronic music inspirations - minimal beats with big strong melodic and harmonic content. This track rips the ass off a dance floor. I've played it from Korea to Brazil, and it's the biggest track I've had to play out for years."

== Release ==
Three years after the release of his fifth studio album, This Binary Universe, BT released the first part of the single through Nettwerk and Black Hole Recordings exclusively on digital music retailer Beatport seven days after its initial due date on June 2. The motif behind the June 9 release date was due to Sonifi, an innovative iPhone application created by his software company Sonik Architects. Earlier in the year, BT played twelve seconds of the song on his 12 Seconds website. A second release has been announced for June 23 through the same record labels. BT conducted a live interview through uStream on the day of the single's release, in which he announced a remix contest for "The Rose of Jericho" on Beatport; the winning remix would be released as part of a bundle.

== Music video ==
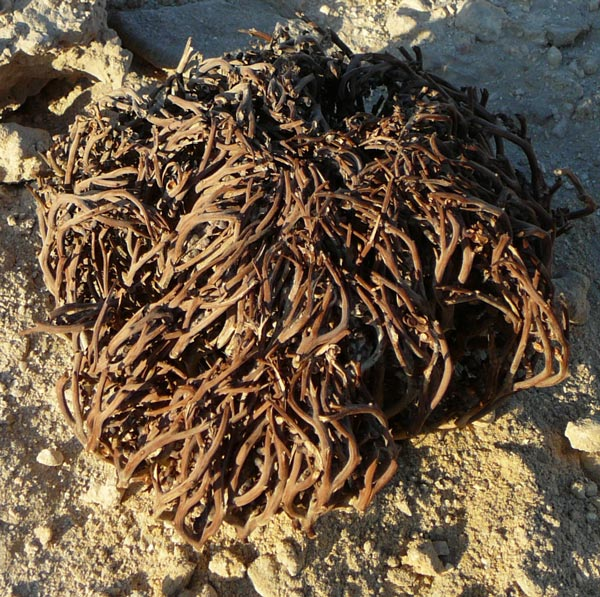
Anastatica hierochuntica, commonly known as Rose of Jericho, is known to be a type of resurrection plant.

The music video for "The Rose of Jericho" was created by DOSE Productions (Sam Hayles). The video includes images of the actual rose of Jericho (seen right) and a tulip, as well as the golden ratio, a motif used in the video for BT's earlier song "1.618". A day prior to the June 9 release, the music video to the single was uploaded to Black Hole's YouTube page.

== Commercial performance ==
=== Charts ===
Within a day of its release, "BT's Deus ex Machina Album Mix" reached position 19 on the Top 100 Progressive house tracks on Beatport at 10:00 am (UTC−6). At the same hour on June 11 it reached position 14, followed by the "Sultan & Ned Shepard Remix" on position 19 in the same chart. On June 12 BT's mix finally entered the Beatport Top 100 downloads, the day after it reached position 63 at noon (UTC−6) and at the same time it held position 9 on the Top 100 Progressive house tracks; Meanwhile, in the Electro house chart the "Robbie Rivera New Juicy Music Mix" was in position 24. On Beatport's Top 100 downloads, BT's mix kept a steady increase in the charts reaching position 47 at noon (UTC−6) on June 15; on June 16 it reached position 39 at noon on the same time zone as well as position 5 on the Progressive house chart. On June 17 BT's album mix disappeared from the Beatport Top 100 and began to fall down from position 5 on the Progressive house chart to position 13 at 2:00 pm (UTC−6). The song remains outside of Beatport's top 100 and its position is 15 on the Progressive house chart for June 18 at noon (UTC−6).

=== Radio and podcasts ===
BT's album mix was featured on Markus Schulz's Global DJ Broadcast radio show for June 11. Sultan and Shepard's mix was played on Ferry Corsten's "Corsten's Countdown" on June 17 and was well received by the public. On June 18, BT's album mix was also played on Armin van Buuren's A State Of Trance and on Black Hole's own radio show.
