= Suddenly (BT song) =

- Suddenly

Single by BT

from the album These Hopeful Machines
- Released: January 12, 2010
- Studio: Home studio
- Genre: Progressive trance, electronic rock
- Length: 8:07
- Label: Nettwerk, Black Hole
- Songwriter(s): Brian Transeau, Christian Burns
- Producer(s): Brian Transeau

BT singles chronology
"Every Other Way" (2009)	"Suddenly" (2010)	"Forget Me" (2010)

Christian Burns singles chronology
"Power of You" (2008)	"Suddenly" (2010)	"Forget Me" (2010)

"Suddenly" is the third single by experimental trance musician BT from his sixth studio album, These Hopeful Machines.

== Track listing ==
Suddenly
No.	Title	Length
1.	"Suddenly (Original Mix)"	8:07
2.	"Suddenly (BT Radio Edit)"	3:31
3.	"Suddenly (Celldweller Remix)"	5:47
4.	"Suddenly (Cicada Remix)"	7:40
5.	"Suddenly (Ferry Corsten Mix)"	9:40
6.	"Suddenly (Dave Darrell Vocal Mix)"	7:39
7.	"Suddenly (JJ Mix)"	4:45
