= Brian Aris =

British photographer

- Born: 1946 (age 79–80); England, United Kingdom
- Occupation: Photographer
- Website: Brianaris.com

Brian Aris is a British photographer who began his career as a photojournalist. Initially, he was a front line photographer of The Troubles in Northern Ireland, the plight of Palestinian children in Jordan, the civil war in Lebanon, famine in Africa and the Vietnam War. In 1976, he met with Paula Yates who wanted to become a model and struck up a friendship with her then boyfriend Bob Geldof. Eventually he decided to change direction and become a photographer of fashion and glamour models, as well as stars of the music industry for newspapers and magazines.

== Music, Film and fashion ==
He has photographed Beatles, Twiggy, Blondie, Linda Ronstadt, Tina Turner, Susan George, The Who, Rolling Stones, Ozzy Osbourne, Van Morrisson, Sophia Loren, Madonna, Meryl Streep, Sheena Easton, Wham!, Annie Lennox, George Michael, Cliff Richard, David Bowie, Elton John, Debbie Harry, The Clash, Pink Floyd, Roxy Music, Joan Collins, Kate Bush, The Jam, The Boomtown Rats, David Beckham, Victoria Beckham, Roxy Music, Rod Stewart, Duran Duran, Big Country, Sting and The Police.

== Royal family ==
He photographed Queen Elizabeth the Queen Mother at Clarence House, and Princess Margaret, Countess of Snowdon at Kensington Palace. Aris was commissioned to produce the official portraits marking both Queen Elizabeth II's 70th birthday and, later, the Golden Wedding Anniversary of her marriage to Prince Philip, Duke of Edinburgh. Other British Royal family members he has photographed include Prince Andrew, Duke of York; Sarah, Duchess of York; Anne, Princess Royal's son Peter Phillips wedding to Autumn Kelly at St George's Chapel, Windsor Castle; and Catherine, Duchess of Cambridge.
