= Beverley Craven (album) =

Studio album by Beverley Craven
- Released: July 1990 (UK)
- Recorded: 1989–1990
- Genre: Pop; smooth jazz; art pop
- Label: Epic
- Producer: Paul Samwell-Smith

Beverley Craven chronology
Beverley Craven (1990)	Love Scenes (1993)

Professional ratings
Review scores
Source	Rating
AllMusic	2/5 stars

Beverley Craven is the debut album by British singer-songwriter Beverley Craven, released in July 1990. The album was fully written by Craven herself and features her biggest hit single and signature song, "Promise Me".

== Background ==
Craven signed to Epic Records in 1988, and initially recorded the album with American producer Stewart Levine (of Simply Red fame). The initial results, however, were not of Craven's liking and, with the agreement of her label, she restarted from scratch working with Paul Samwell-Smith, who eventually produced the whole album. Levine's production of her songs were eventually released as b-sides to some of her singles, under the label "West Coast Version".

Released in July 1990, the album and its singles initially failed to reach the charts in the UK. She found however some success around continental Europe in 1990 and toured there to support the release. Craven made her first UK tour in early 1991, which was successful. In April 1991, the original lead single "Promise Me" was re-released, and this time it was heavily promoted. Appearances on British TV led to exposure of the single and it eventually peaked at No. 3 in the UK in May 1991, becoming her biggest hit.

On the back of the success of the single, the album re-entered the chart (it had previously peaked at No. 53 in March 1991), and peaked at No. 3 in the UK. It spent almost a whole year in the UK chart. Craven's appearance at the 1992 Brit Awards (where she won the Best Newcomer award), propelled the album back into the UK top ten, at No. 7. The album eventually went double platinum in the UK and sold over 1.2 million copies worldwide.

== Single releases ==
Six singles were released to promote the album. The first four singles, released in 1990, failed to chart. With the successful re-release of "Promise Me", previous singles were reissued as its follow-ups: "Holding On" (re-released in July 1991), and "Woman to Woman" (re-released in October 1991), both of which charted within the UK top 40. A new single, "Memories", was released in December 1991. In some countries of continental Europe, "You're Not the First" was also released as a single.

- "Promise Me" (1990/1991) UK No. 3
- "Joey" (1990)
- "Woman to Woman" (1990/1991) UK No. 40
- "Holding On" (1990/1991) UK No. 32
- "You're Not the First" (1991)
- "Memories" (1991) UK No. 68

== Track listing ==
All songs written by Beverley Craven.

1. "Promise Me"
2. "Holding On"
3. "Woman to Woman"
4. "Memories"
5. "Castle in the Clouds"
6. "You're Not the First"
7. "Joey"
8. "Two of a Kind"
9. "I Listen to the Rain"
10. "Missing You"

== Personnel ==
- Beverly Craven: Vocals, keyboards and piano
- Bias Boshell: Keyboards, piano, organ
- Simon Nicol: Guitars
- Jim Williams: Guitar solo on track 6
- Martin Allcock, Pat Donaldson: Bass
- Dave Mattacks: Drums, percussion, cymbals
- Jodie Linscott: Percussion, rainsticks
- Frank Mead: Flute, saxophone
- The Kickhorns: brass section on tracks 6 and 8
- New Orleans Band: musicians on track 10 (Howard Evans: trumpet; Andy Findon: clarinet; Roger Williams: trombone; John Elliot: sousaphone; Graeme Taylor: banjo)
- Nick Bicot: string arrangements on tracks 5 and 9
- Suzanne Rhatigan, Sheila and Sheryl Parker, Tubs Andrew, Paul Samwell-Smith: backing vocals

== Production ==
- Produced by Paul Samwell-Smith
- Engineered by Barry Hammond (6, 7) and Toby Alington (5, 9)
- Mixed by Frank Filipetti (1-4, 8, 10) and Toby Alington (5, 9)
- Design and Art Direction by The Leisure Process
- Photography by Graeme Richardson
- Recorded at Chipping Norton Recording Studios
