= Close to Home (Beverley Craven album) =

Studio album by Beverley Craven
- Released: 31 May 2009 (UK)
- Genre: pop
- Label: Campsie Music
- Producer: Beverley Craven

Beverley Craven chronology
Legends (2005)	Close to Home (2009)	Change of Heart (2014)

Close to Home is Beverley Craven's fourth studio album, her first in ten years. Craven abandoned her music career in 2000, a mixture of writer's block and the need to take care of her three young daughters. In 2004 she made a slow comeback, doing a handful of live appearances, but was shortly after diagnosed with breast cancer. After receiving treatment and given the all-clear, Craven decided to resume her music career.

Close to Home was released in March 2009 and was wholly written and produced by the singer. Craven released the album on her own label Campsie Music, and initially sold the album only through her website and at concerts.

A promo single for "Rainbows" was sent to UK radio stations, and a videoclip was also recorded for it. The song was later available as a digital download single.

The song, "Everlasting Love", was written and recorded in 1995 for the film First Knight (with the title "Legendary Love"); however, it was rejected by the film's producers. Two of the songs directly draw from her breast cancer diagnosis: "Rainbows" and "Without Me", which was written for her daughters. The song "All Yours" was re-recorded by Craven, with altered lyrics, for Nigel Hitchcock's 2013 album Smoothitch and renamed "You're Mine".

== Track listing ==
All tracks composed by Beverley Craven

1. "Rainbows"
2. "All Yours"
3. "Without Me"
4. "Mr Know-It-All"
5. "Never Be The Same"
6. "Your Girl, My Man"
7. "Is It Only Me?"
8. "Everlasting Love"
9. "Fun, Fun, Fun"
10. "Make You Mine"

== Personnel ==
- Beverley Craven – vocals, piano, keyboards, backing vocals
- Ian Bairnson, Tim Cansfield – guitar
- Felix Krish – bass
- Gary Sanctuary – additional piano, keyboards, organ
- Ralph Salmins – drums
- Fergus Gerrand, Dave West – percussion
- Frank Mead – saxophone
- Colin Campsie – backing vocals
- Craig Rennie, Linda Rennie, Peter Nagle, Sally Brown, Sharon Nagle – "crowd" backing vocals
- Emma Owens, Jo Allen, Kotono Sato, Llinos Richards – strings
- Richard Cottle – string arrangement on "Make You Mine"
