= Love Scenes (Beverley Craven album) =

Studio album by Beverley Craven
- Released: 27 September 1993
- Genre: Pop
- Label: Epic
- Producer: Paul Samwell-Smith

Beverley Craven chronology
| Beverley Craven (1990) | Love Scenes (1993) | Mixed Emotions (1999) |

Professional ratings
Review scores
| Source | Rating |
|---|---|
| AllMusic | 3/5 stars |
| Music Week | 4/5 stars |

Love Scenes is the second studio album by British singer Beverley Craven, released in September 1993 through Epic Records.

== Background ==
Craven started writing new songs for her second album while touring for the first one. Epic wanted to release a follow-up to her successful debut album Beverley Craven in 1992 to capitalize on her success. When Craven gave birth to her first daughter, Mollie, in early 1992, she decided to postpone the album's release to take care of the baby, eventually releasing it in September 1993.

The album, like her debut, was produced by Paul Samwell-Smith. It features his former Yardbirds bandmate Jeff Beck on guitar on three tracks. The album was written by Craven herself, except for the song "Love Is the Light", which was co-written with her husband Colin Campsie, this being the only time she has collaborated on writing a song.

Some of the songs on the album had been previously heard on Craven's live videotape Memories, released in 1992. The songs "Feels Like the First Time" and "Look No Further" had been previously released as B-sides for the singles from her debut album. Love Scenes includes a cover of ABBA's "The Winner Takes It All", which Craven recorded for an unreleased 20th anniversary ABBA tribute album.

== Release and reception ==
The album was released on vinyl, CD and MiniDisc formats. It debuted and peaked at #4 in the UK Albums Chart. Although less successful than her debut, it still spent three months on the chart, earned a Gold Disc and Craven another Brit Award nomination for Best British Female Artist at the 1994 ceremony. Three singles were released off the album, with only "Love Scenes" reaching the UK Top 40.

Ian Gilby of Sound on Sound called it "a collection of quintessentially English ballads that echo the naive feel and sentiments of her first outing".

== Single releases ==
- "Love Scenes" (1993) UK #34
- "Mollie's Song" (1993) UK #61
- "The Winner Takes It All" (1994) UK #77

== Track listing ==
All tracks composed by Beverley Craven; except where indicated

1. "Love Scenes"
2. "Love Is the Light" (Beverley Craven, Colin Campsie)
3. "Hope"
4. "Look No Further"
5. "Mollie's Song"
6. "In Those Days"
7. "Feels Like the First Time"
8. "Blind Faith"
9. "Lost Without You"
10. "The Winner Takes It All" (Benny Andersson, Björn Ulvaeus)

== Personnel ==
- Jeff Beck – guitar (2, 3, 10)
- Paul Samwell-Smith – producer
- Adrian Bushby – engineer (1–2, 5–7, 9–10)
- Lolly Grodner – engineer (3–4, 8)
- Mixed by Adrian Bushby and Dieter Rubach
- Mastered by Ted Jensen (Sterling Sound, New York)
- Recorded at Mayfair Studios (London), Outside Studios (Checkendon), Abbey Road Studios (London), Hit Factory (New York)
- Graham Tunna – design
- Kate Garner – photography
