= Mollie's Song =

1993 single by Beverley Craven

Single by Beverley Craven

from the album Love Scenes
- B-side: "Hush Little Baby", "Call Me"
- Released: 8 November 1993
- Length: 4:46
- Label: Epic
- Songwriter(s): Beverley Craven
- Producer(s): Paul Samwell-Smith

Beverley Craven singles chronology
"Love Scenes" (1993)	"Mollie's Song" (1993)	"The Winner Takes It All" (1994)

"Mollie's Song" is a song by British singer Beverley Craven from her second album, Love Scenes.

== Details ==
The song was written about Craven's eldest daughter Mollie, born in 1992, and the lyrics talk about the joy of motherhood and the lifelong duties to it. Craven has cited this song as her favourite among all the ones she's written. The song was included on Craven's 1993 album Love Scenes, and was released as the album's second single on 8 November 1993.

"Mollie's Song" was released as a two-part CD single. CD 2 included the b-side only track "Call Me", and both CD1 and CD2 included as a b-side the traditional lullaby "Hush Little Baby", which was recorded for an episode of the BBC TV programme Challenge Anneka, broadcast on 23 September 1992, in which Anneka Rice organized the release of an album (titled Tommy's Tape), whose royalties would be donated to Tommy's Campaign, for research into premature births at the Children's Intensive Care Unit in St Thomas' Hospital in London. The tape was produced by George Martin and Craven's recording of the lullaby was included in it.

All the royalties from the sale of the "Mollie's Song" single were also donated to Tommy's Campaign. The single peaked at number 61 on the UK Singles Chart for two weeks.

== Track listings ==
CD1

1. "Mollie's Song" 4:46
2. "Hush Little Baby" 1:35
3. "Lost Without You" (Live) 4:34

CD2

1. "Mollie's Song" 4:46
2. "Hush Little Baby" 1:35
3. "Call Me" 3:15
4. "Promise Me" (Live) 3:39

Cassette single

1. "Mollie's Song" 4:46
2. "Hush Little Baby" 1:35

== Charts ==
Chart (1993)	Peak position
UK Singles (OCC)	61
