= The Ghost in You =

Single by the Psychedelic Furs

from the album Mirror Moves
- B-side: "Heartbeat"; "Another Edge"; "President Gas"
- Released: May 1984
- Recorded: 1984
- Genre: New wave; post-punk
- Length: 4:17
- Label: Columbia
- Songwriters: Tim Butler; Richard Butler
- Producer: Keith Forsey

The Psychedelic Furs singles chronology
| "Heaven" (1984) | "The Ghost in You" (1984) | "Here Come Cowboys" (1984) |

Music video
- "The Ghost in You" on YouTube

"The Ghost in You" is a song by the English rock band the Psychedelic Furs, written by the band's lead vocalist Richard Butler and bassist Tim Butler. It was released in May 1984 by Columbia Records as the second single from the band's fourth studio album, Mirror Moves (1984). As a single it peaked at No. 59 on the US Billboard Hot 100, No. 68 on the UK singles chart, and No. 85 in Canada. The British film director Tim Pope directed the song's official music video.

== Track listing ==
12" single (Columbia – 44-04984)

1. "The Ghost in You" (Full Length Version) – 4:17
2. "Heartbeat (New York Remix)" – 8:15

7" single (Columbia – 38 04416)

1. "The Ghost in You" – 3:38
2. "Heartbeat (Remix)" – 5:10

UK 12" single (CBS – TA 4470)

1. "The Ghost in You (Full Length Version)" – 4:17
2. "Another Edge (Full Length Version)" – 6:09
3. "President Gas (Live)" – 5:14

UK 7" single (CBS – A4470)

1. "The Ghost in You" – 3:38
2. "Another Edge" – 3:46
