= Jeff Rich =

English drummer

- Born: Jeffrey Dennis Rich; 8 June 1953 (age 73); Hackney, London, England
- Genres: Rock
- Instruments: Drums, percussion

Jeffrey Dennis Rich (born 8 June 1953) is an English rock drummer, best known for playing with Status Quo between 1985 and 2000.

== Early life ==
Born in Hackney, London, Rich attended Upton House Comprehensive School, and whilst there he appeared in the opera Tosca at the Royal Opera House, Covent Garden.

== Career ==
Rich helped out Def Leppard in August 1986 and played alongside Rick Allen who had lost his left arm in a car accident in December 1984. However, during the band's warm-up tour of Ireland, Rich missed a gig and the rest of the band realised Allen could drum alone. Rich had previously played with Stretch, Judie Tzuke and the Climax Blues Band. In late 1985, he replaced Pete Kircher in Status Quo. In April 2000 he left the group, citing exhaustion and family commitments. He was replaced on drums by Matt Letley.

Since leaving Status Quo, Rich has toured schools across the UK giving masterclasses in drumming and percussion. Rich drums with Stealer, a tribute band to Free.
