= Love Scenes (song) =

1993 single by Beverley Craven

Single by Beverley Craven

from the album Love Scenes
- Released: 13 September 1993
- Length: 3:53
- Label: Epic
- Songwriter: Beverley Craven
- Producers: Paul Samwell-Smith; Dieter Rubach

Beverley Craven singles chronology
"Memories" (1991)	"Love Scenes" (1993)	"Mollie's Song" (1993)

Music video
- "Love Scenes" on YouTube

"Love Scenes" is a song by British singer-songwriter Beverley Craven, released in September 1993, by Epic Records, as the title track and first single from her second album, Love Scenes (1993). The song was written by Craven and produced by Paul Samwell-Smith and Dieter Rubach. It peaked at number 34 in the UK and spent four weeks on the charts, becoming Craven's last UK top-40 hit.

== Background and release ==
After taking a two-year break from music after giving birth to her first daughter, Craven returned to the music scene in September 1993. Love Scenes was released as the first single of her second album.

The song's structure resembles that of a waltz. Lyrically, Craven took inspiration from an actor she was infatuated with, and talk about an obsessive relationship where the narrator is jealous of the "other woman" who's "got her role".

== Critical reception ==
Alan Jones from Music Week gave the song a score of four out of five, writing, "The familiar smokey vocal style is framed by a luxurious and very stylish production, with acoustic doodling over a full orchestral score. Beverley herself is in fine voice on a piece that, though complex, is a surefire winner."

== Music video ==
The accompanying music video for "Love Scenes" features Craven in a theatre watching a play in a box seat. In the scenario there is an actor and an actress, and, referring to the song's lyrics, Craven is seen watching the play with jealousy. At one point, we see Craven fantasizing a reenactment of various iconic movie scenes with the actor in the play. The video ends with Craven leaving the theatre, walking past the actor and the actress outside, who are signing autographs.

The video was filmed in September 1993 at Hackney Empire theatre in London. Actress Tara FitzGerald, a friend of Craven's, plays the part of the actress in the play.

== Track listings ==
- CD single
1. "Love Scenes" – 3:53
2. "Blind Faith" – 4:09
3. "Joey" (live) – 4:02
4. "Look No Further" (live) – 5:58
- 7-inch and cassette single
1. "Love Scenes" – 3:53
2. "Blind Faith" – 4:09

== Charts ==
Chart (1993)	Peak position
Europe (European Hit Radio)	39
UK Singles (OCC)	34
UK Airplay (ERA)	53
