= Beverley Craven =

British singer-songwriter

- Born: 28 July 1963 (age 63); Colombo, Ceylon (now Sri Lanka)
- Genre: Pop
- Occupations: Singer; songwriter; author; musician
- Instruments: Vocals; piano
- Years active: 1988–present
- Labels: CBS Records, Sony BMG/Epic
- Website: beverleycraven.com

Beverley Craven (born 28 July 1963) is a British singer-songwriter best known for her 1991 UK hit single "Promise Me". She has recorded six studio albums, including the collaborative album Woman to Woman with Judie Tzuke and Julia Fordham.

== Biography ==
=== Early life ===
Craven was born in Colombo, Ceylon (now Sri Lanka), in July 1963, while her British father was working there for Kodak. He later worked as an investment advisor. Within two years, the family had relocated to rural Buckinghamshire, to a bungalow on a five-acre plot and where her younger twin sisters were born. Craven began taking piano lessons at the age of seven, encouraged by her music teacher mother who was a classical violinist and who had performed at the Royal Albert Hall.

Upon leaving school, Craven attended art college. She also performed with various bands in London pubs and was writing songs. She was also an accomplished swimmer during her teens and competed in several national swimming competitions around the UK.

Craven did not buy her first pop record until she was 15, when she started buying records by artists such as Kate Bush, the Electric Light Orchestra and Stevie Wonder.

At 18, Craven left school and home and worked in various jobs, living in a south London bedsit. Having failed to find any sympathetic musicians with whom to play, at the age of 22 she decided to strike out on her own as a piano-playing singer and songwriter. Following a brief stint touring with soul singer Bobby Womack, who tried to sign her to his record label, she recorded her first set of demos and attracted the attention of Go West's manager, John Glover. He helped to secure her a major music publishing deal with Warner Brothers and a development contract with Epic Records followed.

=== Debut album ===
In November 1988, Craven was sent to Los Angeles to work with some established songwriters and to 'learn her craft' playing in bars and restaurants. Soon afterwards, again in Los Angeles, she made her first attempt to record her debut album with record producer Stewart Levine. She believed the professionalism of the recordings failed to capture the naivete of her work and was relieved when Epic agreed. She went on to record with Paul Samwell-Smith, whose other production credits included Cat Stevens, Carly Simon and All About Eve.

Craven's eponymous debut album was eventually released in July 1990. Although it initially failed to attract attention in the United Kingdom, it found acceptance in Europe. It was not until April 1991 that she found success in her homeland. A re-released "Promise Me" (written on the back of an early relationship breakdown) was heavily promoted and eventually peaked at No. 3 in the UK singles chart, becoming her biggest hit. This success helped renew significant interest in her debut album, leading to it charting at No. 3 in the UK Albums Chart, staying in the charts for over a year and eventually going double platinum in that country. The album sold in excess of 1.2 million copies worldwide. Other singles released to promote the album, including "Holding On" and "Woman To Woman", were also Top 40 hits and helped maintain album sales.

In 1992 Craven released a videotape, titled Memories, recorded live at the Birmingham Symphony Hall.

In February 1992, Craven performed at the Brit Awards show (following her nomination in three categories), winning the Best British Newcomer Award. She was eight months pregnant when she sang at the Brits and she gave birth to her first child, Mollie, less than a month later.

=== Love Scenes ===
Craven spent much of 1992 enjoying motherhood and recording her second album. Love Scenes, again produced by Paul Samwell-Smith, was released in September 1993. Ian Gilby of Sound on Sound called it "a collection of quintessentially English ballads that echo the naive feel and sentiments of her first outing". It peaked at No. 4 on the UK Albums Chart and spent three months on the chart. It spawned three singles, "Love Scenes", "Mollie's Song" (written for her daughter) and a cover of ABBA's "The Winner Takes It All". The singles all became minor hits, with the title track reaching the UK top 40.

In 1993, she embarked on a twelve-date concert tour and the following Christmas performed at the Royal Albert Hall.

Craven was nominated again in the Best British Female Artist category at the 1994 Brit Awards.

=== Mixed Emotions ===
Craven took a five-year hiatus after giving birth to two more daughters and it was not until 1999 that she released her third album, Mixed Emotions. She recorded the album in her home studio and for the first time produced the record herself. The album peaked at No. 46 in the UK, spending two weeks on the chart. The lead single, "I Miss You", was only released as a promo single as the label declined to release it commercially. After promotion for this album ended, Craven left Epic Records and retired from the music industry to take care of her daughters.

Also in 1999, Craven contributed lead vocals on the song "The Very Last Time", included on the album The Time Machine, by Alan Parsons.

=== 2000s ===
In 2004, The Very Best of Beverley Craven compilation album was released and Craven embarked on a comeback to promote the record, making some live concert appearances, but shortly after she was diagnosed with breast cancer. Following treatment she returned to the stage in 2006, performing in more concerts in subsequent years.

In March 2009, Craven released her first album in ten years, Close To Home, fully written and produced by herself. She released it on her own record label and sold it initially through her website and at concerts, although later in the year she made it available for purchase on online retailers and on digital outlets. The song "Rainbows" was released as a digital download single.

=== 2010s ===
Craven released a live DVD, titled Live in Concert, in August 2010, as well as a songbook later in the year featuring songs from her four albums.

Craven published her autobiography, Truth Be Told, in 2012, selling it exclusively on her website.

Craven's fifth studio album, Change of Heart, was released on 1 September 2014, followed by a tour through the UK in the autumn.

In February 2018, the Woman to Woman tour was announced. Craven toured with fellow British singer-songwriters Judie Tzuke and Julia Fordham, starting in November 2018. A joint single by the three artists, "Safe", was released in March and a studio album, Woman to Woman, was released in late October 2018.

== Personal life ==
After meeting backstage at a Tears for Fears concert in 1991, Craven began a relationship with singer-songwriter Colin Campsie. After the birth of their first daughter, the couple married at Culcreuch Castle in December 1994. The couple have three daughters. They initially lived in Kilburn, North-West London, before moving to Buckinghamshire in 2006, to a family home which Craven bought with the royalties from her single "Promise Me". The couple separated in 2010, when she left her husband and daughters to live nearby. They divorced in 2011.

Craven's family has been significantly impacted by breast cancer, with Craven having first been diagnosed in 2005. In 2014, her sister Kathy died from it at the age of 44, despite having a double mastectomy. Craven herself was diagnosed for a second time soon thereafter; her breast cancer treatment meant she underwent a double mastectomy and lymph node surgery followed by five months of intense chemotherapy treatment. Her second cancer bout also led to the postponement of her 2018 Woman to Woman tour, which resumed in June 2019 after her health had improved. She released her updated autobiography, Truth Be Told, on 1 June 2019. She met her partner, Mike, a businessman in 2019, on the Internet through Guardian Soulmates.

Beverly Craven is vegan.

== Awards and nominations ==
Award	Year	Nominee(s)	Category	Result	Ref.
Brit Awards	1992	Herself	British Newcomer	Won	
Brit Awards	1992	Herself	British Female Solo Artist	Nominated	
Brit Awards	1992	Beverley Craven	British Album of the Year	Nominated	
Brit Awards	1994	Herself	British Female Solo Artist	Nominated	

== Discography ==
- Beverley Craven (1990)
- Love Scenes (1993)
- Mixed Emotions (1999)
- Close to Home (2009)
- Change of Heart (2014)
- Woman to Woman (with Judie Tzuke and Julia Fordham) (2018)
- Woman to Woman (The Live Album) (with Judie Tzuke and Julia Fordham) (2022)
