= Promise Me (Beverley Craven song) =

1990 single by Beverley Craven

Single by Beverley Craven

from the album Beverley Craven
- B-side: "I Listen to the Rain"
- Released: 1990
- Length: 3:36
- Label: Epic
- Songwriter: Beverley Craven
- Producer: Paul Samwell-Smith

Beverley Craven singles chronology
| "Promise Me" (1990) | "Joey" (1990) |

"Promise Me" is a song by British singer-songwriter Beverley Craven. It is written by Craven and produced by Paul Samwell-Smith. Released by Epic Records as the lead single of her debut album, Beverley Craven, in 1990, the song initially failed to chart. Appearances on British TV and a successful UK tour prompted a re-release of the single in 1991, when it peaked at number three on the UK singles chart that May. It was successful across Europe, peaking at number two in Belgium and entering the top 10 in France, Ireland, and the Netherlands. The song became popular with loved ones of military personnel deployed to Iraq and Kuwait during the Gulf War.

== Critical reception ==
David Giles of Music Week stated that "on the evidence of this single, [Craven] is aimed at a Kate Bush level of epic grandeur, and, although the arrangement is classic enough, she lacks Bush's melodic inventiveness". Writing for AllMusic, Charles Donovan said that it was "now widely acclaimed as a contemporary standard".

== Track listings ==
All songs were written by Beverley Craven.

- 7-inch and mini-CD single
1. "Promise Me" – 3:35
2. "I Listen to the Rain" – 2:55

== Music video ==
The music video for "Promise Me" shows footage of Beverley Craven singing the song while playing it on the piano, interspeded with scenes filmed at the Didcot railway station.

== Charts ==
=== Weekly charts ===
| Chart (1990–1991) | Peak position |
|---|---|
| Australia (ARIA) | 117 |
| Belgium (Ultratop 50 Flanders) | 2 |
| Europe (Eurochart Hot 100) | 16 |
| Europe (European Hit Radio) | 14 |
| France (SNEP) | 6 |
| Ireland (IRMA) | 7 |
| Luxembourg (Radio Luxembourg) | 4 |
| Netherlands (Dutch Top 40) | 8 |
| Netherlands (Single Top 100) | 7 |
| UK Singles (Official Charts) | 3 |
| UK Airplay (Music Week) | 5 |

=== Year-end charts ===
| Chart (1990) | Position |
|---|---|
| Belgium (Ultratop) | 32 |
| Netherlands (Dutch Top 40) | 50 |
| Netherlands (Single Top 100) | 51 |

| Chart (1991) | Position |
|---|---|
| Europe (Eurochart Hot 100) | 80 |
| UK Singles (OCC) | 29 |

== Certifications ==
| Region | Certification | Certified units/sales |
|---|---|---|
| France (SNEP) | Silver | 125,000^{*} |
^{*} Sales figures based on certification alone.

== Release history ==
| Region | Date | Format(s) | Label(s) | Ref. |
|---|---|---|---|---|
| United Kingdom | 1990 | —N/a | Epic | |
| Japan | 21 September 1990 | Mini-CD | Epic | |
| United Kingdom (re-release) | 25 March 1990 | 7-inch vinyl; 12-inch vinyl; CD; cassette | Epic | |
| Australia | 10 June 1991 | CD; cassette | Epic | |

== Covers and sampling ==
The song has been covered numerous times, most notably being reworked as a dance song by group Lazard, who re-titled the song "4 O'Clock (In the Morning)". Other cover versions are by Jodie Brooke Wilson, Hind, Lutricia McNeal, Sandy Lam, Tabea, and by Rosa López who released a Spanish version (titled "Júrame") in 2008; a more faithful Spanish version was named "Entre tú y yo" and was performed by Mexican actress Chantal Andere in 1992 for her second album and as the main title song of the telenovela Triángulo. Other notable covers are by Hong Kong Cantopop diva Sandy Lam titled as "Without You, But Still Love You", and Taiwanese Mandopop diva Winnie Hsin titled as "Selfish". Sometimes the Mandarin version and English version would be crossed over for singing competitions, as exemplified by British-Taiwanese singer (now newscaster) Annie Lin (林宜融).

In June 2012, Technoboy and Tuneboy sampled the song on their hardstyle single "Promise Me". Three months later, German techno band Scooter sampled "Promise Me" on their single "4 AM", in a nod to a 1993 breakbeat hardcore track by Orca, which also sampled verses from "Promise Me".
