= Judie Tzuke =

English singer-songwriter (born 1956)

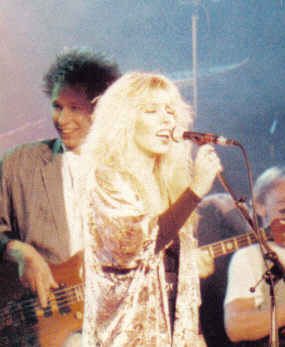
- Tzuke at Fairfield Halls, Croydon; September 1985

Background information
- Born: Judie Myers; 3 April 1956 (age 70); London, England, United Kingdom
- Genres: Pop rock; hard rock; soft rock; folk pop
- Occupation: Singer-songwriter
- Years active: 1979–present
- Labels: The Rocket Record Company; Chrysalis; Polydor; Columbia; Capitol; Castle; Big Moon
- Website: tzuke.com

Judie Tzuke (/zuːk/ ZOOK; born Judie Myers, 3 April 1956) is an English singer-songwriter. She is best known for her 1979 hit "Stay with Me till Dawn", which reached number 16 on the UK singles chart.

== Life and career ==
=== Early life ===
Tzuke's family relocated from Poland to England in the 1920s, and like many other Jewish families from Eastern Europe, changed their surname - from Tzuke to Myers. Her mother, Jean Silverside, was a television actress, and her father, Sefton Myers, was a successful property developer who also managed artists and singers—most notably Andrew Lloyd Webber and Tim Rice during the writing of Jesus Christ Superstar. Tzuke preferred the original family name, started using it at school and so, when Tzuke embarked on her singing career, she used it as her stage name.

Educated in the visual arts, performing arts, and music, Tzuke performed in folk clubs from the age of 15. Her meeting with Mike Paxman in 1975 was a turning point and they began to collaborate. Under the name Tzuke & Paxo, they eventually secured a recording contract and the duo released a single, "These are the Laws", produced by Tony Visconti.

=== Early success ===
Tzuke's career as a solo artist began in 1977, when she signed to Elton John's label The Rocket Record Company. Her first single on Rocket, "For You", was released in 1978. Her most notable success, "Stay with Me till Dawn", was released in 1979. The song, which was co-written with Mike Paxman, became a top 20 hit on the UK Singles Chart in the summer of 1979 and a top 10 hit in Australia and was featured on Tzuke's 1979 debut album, Welcome to the Cruise, which was also a top 20 hit on the UK Albums Chart. In 2002, "Stay with Me till Dawn" was chosen by the British public in a poll of the 50 Best British Songs 1952–2002 (ranking at number 39).

Tzuke's second album, Sports Car (1980), charted higher than her debut album (reaching No. 7 in the UK) and contained one single, "Living on the Coast", which failed to chart. Both albums were certified gold by the British Phonographic Industry in 1981. Tzuke became Elton John's support act for his North American tour, and she was the opening act in front of 400,000 people who turned out to watch his free concert at New York's Central Park on September 13, 1980. She went on to release one more album on Rocket, I Am the Phoenix (1981), which also made the UK top 20.

=== 1982–1995 ===
In 1982, Tzuke signed to Chrysalis Records and released her fourth album, Shoot the Moon. Although the album reached the UK top 20, it was Tzuke's last album to do so. Three singles were taken from the album (including a 7" picture disc release for "I'm Not a Loser"), but none were chart hits. Tzuke completed a 57 date tour of the UK, culminating as the headline act at that year's Glastonbury Festival. The performance was recorded for a TV special by ITV. Several performances from the tour were recorded and released at the end of 1982 as a double album, Road Noise: The Official Bootleg.

In 1983, Rocket issued a compilation album, The Best of Judie Tzuke, and released the track "Black Furs" as a single (the original version of which was on Tzuke's 1981 album I Am the Phoenix). September 1983 saw the release of Tzuke's fifth studio album, Ritmo (Spanish for "rhythm"). The album was somewhat of a departure from her previous work, with a more electronic feel. The album peaked at No. 26 in the UK.

After two albums, Tzuke left Chrysalis Records. She signed with the small independent Legacy Records for the release of her next album. A new single, "You", was released in October 1984. A cover of a lesser-known Marvin Gaye track, her version peaked at No. 92 in the UK. In March 1985, "I'll Be the One" was issued as a new single from Tzuke's forthcoming sixth album, The Cat Is Out, which was mainly recorded at her home studio and released in June 1985. The single peaked at No. 97, while the album peaked at No. 35 on the UK Albums Chart.

Following the muted reception of The Cat Is Out, Tzuke signed with another major label, Polydor Records, in 1987. She began working on her seventh album, though took some time off in June 1987 when she gave birth to her first daughter, Bailey. The album, Turning Stones, was released in April 1989, peaking at No. 57 on the UK Albums Chart. It was preceded by the single "We'll Go Dreaming", which had peaked at No. 96 several weeks earlier.

In 1990, she switched to Columbia Records (CBS). In August, she released a new single, a cover version of the Beach Boys song "God Only Knows". However, the song failed to gain chart success. The song featured in an ITV documentary series about recording techniques, where Tzuke and her producers Mike Paxman and Paul Muggleton showed how the song had been constructed using samples of her voice which were transposed into a synthesizer range. Her eighth album, Left Hand Talking, was released by Columbia in May 1991. "Outlaws" was released as a single by Columbia in June 1991, but neither the album nor single made an impact upon the charts. Her tenure with Columbia ended after only one album.

Tzuke signed with another small independent label for the release of her ninth album, Wonderland, which was released in September 1992 by Essential Records (a subsidiary of the now-defunct Castle Communications). Two singles from the album, "Wonderland" and "Fly", were performed on the BBC1 lunchtime programme Pebble Mill at One in November 1992. The album, which featured musician Brian May and violinist Nigel Kennedy, did not chart.

August 1995 saw the release of two albums. The BBC issued its recording of Tzuke's "Radio 1 in Concert" performance from 1981, and Polygram issued a compilation album titled Stay with Me till Dawn, which drew on Tzuke's first three albums released on Rocket Records with tracks from the Turning Stones album on Polydor Records.

=== 1996–present ===
Tzuke released her tenth studio album, Under the Angels, in October 1996 on her own label, Big Moon Records. Recordings from a tour to promote the album culminated in another live album, Over the Moon (1997).

In 1998, Tzuke released her eleventh studio album, Secret Agent, again on her own label, Big Moon. Bob Harris of BBC Radio 2 included one of the album's tracks, "Tonight", on his compilation CD Bob Harris Presents... (Vol.1). In 2000, Tzuke gained the rights to her first three albums recorded for Rocket Records and reissued them on CD via Big Moon. She named her tour later that year the "Phoenix Tour", a reference to her last Rocket Records album, I Am the Phoenix. Following this came a live album, Six Days Before the Flood (2000), and a studio album, Queen Secret Keeper (2001). Another live album, Drive Live, was released in 2002.

Tzuke then released an album of covers, The Beauty of Hindsight, in September 2003. A self-promoted tour in September ended with two nights at London's Bush Hall. Two dates in March 2004 were played at London's Cabot Hall in Canary Wharf as part of the Docklands Music Festival and the following night at Dartford's Mick Jagger Centre.

In 2007, Tzuke released her fifteenth album, Songs 1. It was accompanied by a tour, with her daughter Bailey Tzuke on backing vocals, and collaborations with other musicians such as Gareth Gates on piano.

June 2008 saw the release of Tzuke's sixteenth studio album, Songs 2. The same year, she co-wrote four tracks with the band Morcheeba, and featured as a vocalist on two tracks from their Dive Deep album.

In 2010, Tzuke released a thirty-year celebratory double-album titled Moon On a Mirrorball, via a new deal with Wrasse Records. Wrasse also re-released all of Tzuke's Big Moon back catalogue as downloads, and reissued her debut album Welcome to the Cruise on CD. A live album, October Road, was recorded from the tour and was released in March 2011 via Tzuke's official website. In 2011, she contributed to John Martyn's tribute album, Johnny Boy Would Have Loved This, with a recording of Martyn's "Hurt in Your Heart".

Tzuke announced in early 2013 that work had commenced on a new album titled Woman Overboard. Due to Tzuke being diagnosed with cancer, work on the album was halted.

In 2018, Tzuke joined with Beverley Craven and Julia Fordham to record "Safe", a song that she had written with Beth Nielsen Chapman, whilst on a Chris Difford songwriting retreat. An album was released titled Woman to Woman, together with a tour of the same name in late 2018. Several dates at larger venues included orchestras.

== Discography ==
Studio albums

- Welcome to the Cruise (1979)
- Sports Car (1980)
- I Am the Phoenix (1981)
- Shoot the Moon (1982)
- Ritmo (1983)
- The Cat Is Out (1985)
- Turning Stones (1989)
- Left Hand Talking (1991)
- Wonderland (1992)
- Under the Angels (1996)
- Secret Agent (1998)
- Queen Secret Keeper (2001)
- The Beauty of Hindsight (2003)
- The End of the Beginning (2004)
- Songs 1 (2007)
- Songs 2 (2008)
- One Tree Less (2011)
- Song Club (2013)
- Christmas with the Tzukettes (2013)
- Songclub Too (2014)
- Peace Has Broken Out (2017)
- Woman to Woman with Beverley Craven and Julia Fordham (2018)
- Jude the Unsinkable (2023)
- Now or Never (2025)
