= Mike Paxman =

Mike Paxman Mike Paxman
- Born: 19 December 1953 (age 72); Salisbury, England
- Genres: Rock, Pop, Jazz
- Occupations: Producer, Musician, Writer
- Instrument: Guitar
- Years active: 1978–present

Mike Paxman (born 19 December 1953) is an English multi-instrumentalist and record producer, best known for his work with Judie Tzuke, Nick Kamen, Uriah Heep and bands, Status Quo and Asia.

Paxman grew up in Wiltshire, England and went to Bishop Wordsworth's School in Salisbury. During the late 1970s, he played drums in the Salisbury-based contemporary jazz quartet Sphere, along with saxophonist Andy Sheppard, pianist Geoff Williams, and double bassist Peter Maxfield (they all had been students at BWS).

He played guitar, in the studio and on tour, and wrote with singer-songwriter Judie Tzuke from the late 1970s. He co-wrote Tzuke's single "Stay with Me till Dawn" and her first album Welcome to the Cruise. He wrote and produced a further twelve albums, including Sports Car, I Am The Phoenix and Turning Stones working with Tzuke until the late 1990s.

Beginning in the mid-1980s, Paxman focused on production work founding Big Ocean Studios with Paul Muggleton, Tzuke's partner. They worked with artists including Nick Kamen on the album Move Until We Fly, including the hit single "I Promised Myself"), and the album Whatever, Whenever. Paul Norton (Under a Southern Sky), Scarlet (the album Naked and single "Independent Love Song"), Thomas Anders (the album Whispers), Frances Ruffelle, and Jimmy Nail.

Paxman has worked with Status Quo extensively producing several albums and DVDs including Under The Influence (1999), Heavy Traffic (2002), The Party Ain't Over Yet... (2005), Quid Pro Quo (2011), Aquostic (2014) and Aquostic II (2016). He produced and mixed the Status Quo Frantic Four live reunion DVDs in 2013 and 2014.

Paxman produced Quo's John "Rhino" Edwards' solo albums Rhino's Revenge, released in 2000, Rhino's Revenge II, released in 2015, Charge - Rhino's Revenge Live in 2019, and Just Sayin' released in 2023. He produced Quo keyboard player Andy Bown's solo albums: Unfinished Business, released in September 2011 and Out There, a collaboration with the American science fiction writer Russell Hoban, released in 2025.

Paxman produced the band First Light and the album How The Land Lies with guitarist Ronnie Johnson and drummer Geoff Dunn, and worked again with Johnson on the album Dez Ezé in 2026.

Paxman produced four studio albums with Uriah Heep: Wake the Sleeper (2008), Celebration – Forty Years of Rock (2009), Into the Wild (2011) and Outsider (2014). He also produced a number of live albums and DVDs for the band.

Paxman was the producer for Omega from Asia with original members John Wetton, Steve Howe, Carl Palmer, and Geoff Downes in 2010. Paxman produced Asia's 30th anniversary studio album XXX, which was released in mid 2012. XXX was the final Asia album with the original lineup after the departure of Steve Howe and the death of founder and singer, John Wetton on 31 January 2017.
