= Emily Lazar =

American mastering engineer

- Born: Emily B. Lazar; New York, U.S.
- Occupation: Mastering engineer

Emily B. Lazar is an American mastering engineer. She is the founder, president, and chief mastering engineer of The Lodge, an audio mastering facility that has operated in New York City's Greenwich Village since 1997. She won a Grammy Award for Best Engineered Album, Non-Classical for Beck's album Colors, becoming the first female mastering engineer to win in this category.

== Early life and education ==
Lazar was born and raised in New York. She earned a Bachelor of Arts Degree in Creative Writing and Music from Skidmore College, graduating cum laude with honors distinction in her major. During college, she wrote music, played in bands, and worked as a freelance engineer, producer and mixer. After college, Lazar worked at recording studios in New York City. Later she earned a Master of Music Degree from New York University's prestigious Music Technology program. While there, she pursued Tonmeister studies and was awarded a Graduate Fellowship. Lazar's thesis on Sonic Solutions, combined with an internship at Sony Classical, eventually led to a position at New York City based mastering facility, Masterdisk.

== Career ==
Lazar has worked on over 3,000 albums. In 2012, she was the first female mastering engineer to receive a Grammy Nomination for Album of the year for Foo Fighters’ Wasting Light. In 2014, she was the first female mastering engineer nominated for Record of the Year for Sia's hit "Chandelier” in 2014.”

In 2019, Lazar became the first female mastering engineer to win the Best Engineered Album (Non-Classical) Grammy, which she won for her work on Beck's Colors.

In 2021, Lazar became the first mastering engineer to land three Grammy nominations for Album of the Year. Leading up to the Grammy Awards, Chris Martin from Coldplay said that their latest album could have sounded terrible if it had not been for Lazar's mastering.

=== The Lodge ===
Lazar's studio, The Lodge, is an audio mastering facility, opened in 1997 in Greenwich Village in downtown Manhattan. In 2023, The Lodge relocated to Stamford, Connecticut, with newly built state of the art recording, immersive mixing & mastering studios.

== Awards and nominations ==
Grammy Awards

- 2012 – Album of the Year for Wasting Light by Foo Fighters
- 2015 – Record of the Year for Chandelier by Sia
- 2016 – Best Engineered Album, Non-Classical for Recreational Love by The Bird and the Bee
- 2019 – (Win) Best Engineered Album (Non-Classical) for Colors by Beck
- 2020 – Album of the Year for Father of the Bride by Vampire Weekend
- 2021 – Album of the Year for Women in Music Pt. III by Haim
- 2021 – Album of the Year for Djesse Vol. 3 by Jacob Collier
- 2021 – Album of the Year for Everyday Life by Coldplay
- 2025 – Album of The Year for Djesse Vol. 4 by Jacob Collier

Latin Grammy Awards

- 2022 – Album of the Year for Deja by Bomba Estéreo

Pensado Awards

- 2014 – Lazar was nominated for the Master of Mastering - Mastering Engineers Award at the first annual Pensado Awards show.

TEC Awards

- 2012 – Lazar won the Technical Excellence & Creativity (TEC) Award in the "Record/Production Album" category for her work on Foo Fighters's Wasting Light.
- 2016 – Lazar won the Technical Excellence & Creativity (TEC) Award in the "Record/Production Single or Track" category for her work on Beck's "Dreams".
- 2019 – Lazar won the Technical Excellence & Creativity (TEC) Award in the "Record/Production Album" category for her work on Beck's Colors.

Billboard Magazine: Women in Music: Hitmakers from Behind the Scenes

- 2015 – Lazar was featured in the December issue of Billboard's Women in Music: Hitmakers from Behind the Scenes "Fine-tuned ears are the trademarks of these four creators. Emily Lazar's golden ears are in high-demand. Just ask clients like Foo Fighters, Beck and Coldplay, whose new album A Head Full of Dreams, tops Lazar's discography."

Elle Magazine: The Women in Music Power List

- 2017 – Lazar was featured in the June issue of Elle's The Women in Music Power List highlighting 14 women as "the industry's most influential execs, producers and songwriters."

Variety Magazine: Power of Women Impact List

- 2019 – Lazar was featured in the April issue of Variety's The Power of Women Impact List recognizing "women at the forefront of their fields."

Splice Awards: Impact Award (awarded to those who refuse to leave change up to chance)

- 2021 – Lazar received the Impact Award from music technology company, Splice, for her work in advocating for diversity and inclusion for producers and engineers in the recording industry.

Resonator Awards: Hall Of Fame

- 2024 – Lazar was inducted into the first class of We Are Moving The Needle’s Resonator Hall of Fame, which honors legendary producers and engineers who paved the way. Fellow inductees include – Alicia Keys, Leslie Ann Jones, Darcy Proper Marcella Araica, Ann Mincieli and Claudia Brant.

Music Producer's Guild UK - Inspiration Award

- 2024 – Lazar was awarded the 2024 Inspiration Award by the Music Producers Guild on Thursday, April 25 in London. This is awarded by the Music Producers Guild Awards Committee and will be presented to a person working in production in recognition of a body of work over several years which has significantly inspired others.

== Credits ==
=== 2010 ===
Artist	Album	Label
BT	These Hopeful Machines	Nettwerk
Vampire Weekend	Contra	XL Recordings
Crime in Stereo	I Was Trying to Describe You to Someone	Bridge Nine Records
Minus the Bear	Omni	Dangerbird Records
Envy on the Coast	Lowcountry	Photo Finish Records
Sleigh Bells	Treats	Mom and Pop Records
Against Me	White Crosses	Sire Records
Maps & Atlases	Perch Patchwork	Barsuk Records
Kathryn Calder	Are You My Mother?	File Under: Music
Matt Pond PA	The Dark Leaves	Altitude Records
Chromeo	Business Casual	Atlantic Records
Chief	Modern Rituals	Domino Records
Magic Kids	Memphis	True Panther Sounds
Tiësto	Kaleidoscope: Remixed	Musical Freedom
Armin van Buuren	Mirage	Armada Records
Ólöf Arnalds	Innundir skinni	One Little Indian
Fran Healy	Wreckorder	Wreckord Label
Twin Shadow	Forget	4AD Records
Mt. Desolation	Mt. Desolation	Island Records
The Suzan	Golden Week for the Poco Poco Beat	Fool's Gold Records
Raphael	Pacific 231	EMI France
The Xcerts	Scatterbrain	Xtra Mile Recordings
The Naked and Famous	Passive Me, Aggressive You	Universal/Republic
BT	These Humble Machines	Nettwerk
The Postelles	Spend the Night	Astralwerks
Skuli Sverrisson	Seria II	Seria Music

=== 2011 ===
Artist	Album	Label
The Naked & Famous	Passive Me, Aggressive You	Polydor Ltd/Fiction
Brand New	Your Favorite Weapon (Reissue)	Razor & Tie/Triple Crown Records
The Raveonettes	Rarities/B-Sides	The Orchard
White Denim	D	Downtown Records
Foo Fighters	Wasting Light	SAM Records/Roswell Records
Morgan Page	In The Air	Nettwerk Music Group
Ben Lee	Deeper into Dream	Ten Finger Records/Gold Village
Cubic Zirconia	Follow Your Heart	Fool's Gold Records
Ólöf Arnalds	Ólöf Sings	One Little Indian
Against Me!	White Crosses/Black Crosses	Total Trebel Music
CANT	Dreams Come True	Terrible Records/Warp Records
Boy & Bear	Moonfire	Universal Music Australia
Fucked Up	David Comes to Life	Matador
Big Talk	Big Talk	Epitaph Records/ANTI Records
Thievery Corporation	Culture of Fear	ESL
Above & Beyond	Group Therapy	Anjunabeats
Tiësto	Club Life: Volume II - Las Vegas	Musical Freedom
Cults	Cults	Columbia Records
Against Me!	Total Clarity	Fat Wreck Chords

=== 2012 ===
Artist	Album	Label
The Killers	Battle Born	Mercury Records
Alanis Morissette	Havoc and Bright Lights	Collective Sounds
Shiny Toy Guns	III	Five Seven Music
Santana	Shape Shifter	Starfaith Records
BT	If the Stars Are Eternal So Are You and I	Laptop Symphony
BT	Morceau Subrosa	Laptop Symphony
Garbage	Not Your Kind of People	STUNVOLUME
Tiësto	Club Life: Volume 2 - Miami	Musical Freedom
Sondre Lerche	Bootlegs	Mana Records
Diamond Rings	Free Dimensional	Astralwerks
Bush Tetras	Happy	Reachout International Records, Inc.
The Cringe	Hiding in Plain Sight	Listen Records
Eleni Mandell	I Can See the Future	Yep Roc Records
Trust	TRST	Arts & Crafts Productions
Nigel Dupree	Up to No Good	Mighty Loud Records
Jeff Wayne	War of the Worlds: The New Generation	101 Distribution
Shoes	Ignition	Black Vinyl Records
Matt Boerum	Cold Hearted Disaster	Matthew Boerum
Misstress Barbara	Many Shades of Grey	MapleMusic Recordings
Say Anything	...Is A Real Boy	Doghouse Records
Indochine	Paradize +10	Sony Music

=== 2013 ===
Artist	Album	Label
Vampire Weekend	Modern Vampires of the City	XL Recordings
Weeknight	Post Everything	Hand Drawn Dracula
Various artists	Saint Heron	Saint Records
The Killers	Direct Hits	Mercury Records
BT	A Song Across Wires	Armada Music
Sound City: Real to Reel	Sound City	Roswell Records
Haim	Days Are Gone	Polydor
James Vincent McMorrow	Post Tropical	Vagrant Records
The Julie Ruin	Run Fast	Dischord Records
Party Supplies	Tough Love	Fool's Gold Records
The Fatty Acids	Boléro	Kribber Krown Records
Tyler Ward	Honestly	Sony Music
Sky Ferreira	Night Time, My Time	Capitol Records
Emily Jane White	Bloodlines	Important Records
Hellogoodbye	Everything Is Debatable	Old Friends Records
Various artists	Grand Theft Auto V Soundtrack	Rockstar Games
Balance and Composure	The Things We Think We're Missing	No Sleep Records
The Living Sisters	Run for Cover	Vanguard
Golden Suits	Golden Suits	Yep Roc
Various artists	This Is the End: Original Motion Picture Soundtrack	RCA Records
Bernard Fanning	Departures	Dew Process
Candlelight Red	Reclamation	Imagen Records
The Boxer Rebellion	Promises	Absentee Recordings
Armin van Buuren	Intense	Armada Music
The Postal Service	Give Up:10th Anniversary Deluxe Edition	Sub Pop
Matthew Shell & Arun Shenoy	"Genesis" (single)	MTS Music/Narked Records

=== 2014 ===
Artist	Album	Label
Sia	1000 Forms of Fear	RCA Records
The Reassure	Echoe	Örange Penguin Studio
Linkin Park	The Hunting Party	Warner Bros. Records
Linkin Park	The Hunting Party: Live From Mexico	Warner Bros. Records
Say Anything	Hebrews	RCA Records
Mimicking Birds	Eons	Glacial Pace Records
Garbage	10" Single Record Store Day Release	STUNVOLUME
Hamilton Leithauser	Black Hours	Ribbon Music
Christina Perri	Head or Heart	Sony Records
Neon Hitch	301 to Paradise	Warner Bros. Records
TRUST	Joyland	Arts & Crafts
Dive Index	Lost in the Pressure	Neutral Milk
La Dispute	Rooms of the House	No Sleep Records
Twofish	Zero Crossing	Self-released

=== 2015 ===
Artist	Album	Label
Coldplay	A Head Full of Dreams	Parlophone
The Front Bottoms	Back On Top	Fueled By Ramen
Peaches	Rub	I U She Music
Brandon Flowers	The Desired Effect	Island Records
Oh No	Welcome to Los Santos	Rockstar Games
HOLYCHILD	The Shape of Brat Pop to Come	Glassnote Records
The Bird and the Bee	Recreational Love	Rostrum Records
Mika	No Place in Heaven	Casablanca Records
BT	Electronic Opus	Binary Acoustics
Slightly Stoopid	Meanwhile...Back at the Lab	Silver Back Music
Smallpools	Lovetap!	RCA Records
Robert DeLong	In the Cards	Glassnote Records
Kate Pierson	Guitars and Microphones	Lazy Meadow Music
Braids	Deep in the Iris	Arbutus Records
Morgan Page	DC to Light	Netwerk Music Group
Milo Greene	Control	Elektra Records
Baio	The Names	Glassnote Records
Mas Ysa	Seraph	Downtown Records
Natalie Imbruglia	"Instant Crush" (single)	Columbia Records
Beck	"Dreams" (single)	Capitol Music Group
Duncan Sheik	"Selling Out (Fischer King Remix)"	Atlantic Records
FoxTrott	A Taller Us	Little Indians Records
Veruca Salt	Ghost Notes	El Camino Records
Speedy Ortiz	Foil Deer	Carpark Records
Beauty Pill	Beauty Pill Describes Things As They Are	Butterscotch Records
Title Fight	Hyperview	Good Fight Entertainment
Baltimore	Tigers of the Year	Self-released

=== 2016 ===
Artist	Album	Label
Foo Fighters	"Saint Cecilia" (single)	Columbia Records/RCA Records
Sia	This Is Acting	Monkey Puzzle/RCA Records
Dustin O'Halloran/Hauschka	Lion: Original Motion Picture Soundtrack	Sony Classical
Angel Olsen	My Woman	Jagjaguwar
Switchfoot	Where the Light Shines Through	Concord Vanguard, Universal Records
Garbage	Strange Little Birds	Sony BMG/Vagrant Records
Tegan and Sara	Love You to Death	Rhino Entertainment/Vapor/Warner Bros. Records
Ronnie Spector	English Heart	Savoy Records
Thalia	Latina	Sony BMG/Sony Music
Broods	Conscious	Capitol Records/Island Records/Universal Records
Margaret Glaspy	Emotions and Math	ATO Records
Ben Alessi	U	Big House Publishing
Moby/Moby & the Void Pacific Choir	These Systems Are Failing	Arts & Crafts Productions
Coldplay	A Head Full of Dreams 5.1 Surround Mix	Parlophone

=== 2017 ===
Artist	Album	Label
Beck	Colors	Capitol Records
Morrissey	Low in High School	BMG
Haim	Something to Tell You	Polydor Records
Rostam	Half-Light	Nonesuch
Dams of the West	Youngish American	30th Century Records/Columbia Records
Ruth B	Safe Haven	Columbia Records
The Chainsmokers	Memories...Do Not Open	Columbia Records
Coldplay	A L I E N S	Parlophone
Coldplay	All I Can Think About Is You	Parlophone
Coldplay	Kaleidoscope EP	Parlophone
Mary Lambert	Bold	Mary Lambert Productions
Coldplay	"Hypnotised" (song)	Parlophone
Thievery Corporation	The Temple of I & I	Eighteenth Street/ESL Music/Ye
Baltimore	Summer Rain	Self-released
Ben Alessi	PRSSR	Big House Recordings
Meresha	Enter the Dreamland	Sonic Dolphin
Ha*Ash	30 de Febrero	Sony Music Latin

=== 2018 ===
Artist	Album	Label
All Hail the Silence	All Hail the Silence	Self-released
Panic! At The Disco	Pray for the Wicked	Fueled By Ramen
Coldplay	Live in Buenos Aires	Parlophone
Coldplay	Live in Buenos Aires/Live in São Paulo/A Head Full of Dreams	Parlophone
Dizzy	Baby Teeth	Royal Mountain Records
Speedy Ortiz	Twerp Verse	Gravesend
Dolly Parton	Dumplin'	Legacy

=== 2019 ===
Artist	Album	Label
Vampire Weekend	Father of the Bride	Columbia Records
Maggie Rogers	Heard It in a Past Life	Capitol Records
Coldplay	Everyday Life	Parlophone
Clairo	Immunity	Fader
Cherry Glazerr	Stuffed & Ready	Secretly Canadian
Jacob Collier	Djesse Vol. 2	Hajanga Records
Goo Goo Dolls	Miracle Pill	Warner Records
Charly Bliss	Young Enough	Barsuk Records
Chris Lastovicka	Fortune Has Turned (Remixed)	Ahari Press
Sara Evans	TBD	Born To Fly Records
Sour Widows	Sour Widows EP	Self Released

=== 2020 ===
Artist	Album	Label
Alanis Morissette	Such Pretty Forks in the Road	Epiphany Music / Thirty Tigers
Haim	Women in Music Pt. III	Columbia Records
Wallflower	Teach Yourself To Swim	Self-Released
My Morning Jacket	The Waterfall II	ATO Records
Jacob Collier	Djesse Vol. 3	Hajanga Records
Soul Asylum	Hurry Up and Wait	Blue Élan Records
AWOLNATION	Angel Miners & the Lightning Riders	Better Noise Records
Morrissey	I Am Not a Dog on a Chain	BMG
The Killers	Imploding the Mirage	Island Records
Travis	10 Songs	BMG
Chicano Batman	Invisible People	ATO Records
Troy "Trombone Shorty" Andrews / Little Big Town	Jambalaya (On the Bayou)	ATO Records
Little Big Town	Nightfall	ATO Records
The Struts	Strange Days	ATO Records
Marina	Man's World	Atlantic
Hamilton Leithauser	The Loves of Your Life	Glassnote Records
Hinds	The Prettiest Curse	Lucky Number
Dizzy	The Sun and Her Scorch	Royal Mountain Records
Kaitlyn Aurelia Smith	The Mosaic of Transformation	Ghostly International

=== 2021 ===
Artist	Album	Label
Angels & Airwaves	Lifeforms	Rise Records

=== 2022 ===
Artist	Album	Label
Maggie Rogers	Surrender	Debay Sounds, Capitol Records
Momma	Household Name	Polyvinyl, Lucky Number

=== 2023 ===
Artist	Album	Label
Romy	Mid Air	Young

=== 2024 ===
Artist	Album	Label
Jacob Collier	Djesse Vol. 4	Hajanga Records
The Offspring	Supercharged	Concord Records
Lady Gaga	Harlequin	Interscope Records
Willie Nelson	Last Leaf on the Tree	Legacy Recordings
Maggie Rogers	Don't Forget Me	Debay Sounds / Capitol Records
Bastille	"&" [Ampersand]	Best Laid Plans Records, EMI

=== 2026 ===
Artist	Album	Label
Protomartyr	Hotel Usona	Domino
Asian Kung-Fu Generation	Fanclub (2026 Remaster)	Ki/oon
