= Joyland (TR/ST album) =

Studio album by TR/ST
- Released: March 4, 2014
- Recorded: 2013
- Genre: Synth-pop; EBM; futurepop; cold wave; dark wave
- Length: 50:04
- Label: Arts & Crafts
- Producer: Robert Alfons

TR/ST chronology
TRST (2012)	Joyland (2014)	The Destroyer (Part 1) (2019)

Singles from Joyland
- 1. "Rescue, Mister" Released: January 7, 2014; 2. "Capitol" Released: February 10, 2014; 3. "Are We Arc?" Released: 2014

Joyland is the second studio album by Canadian electronic music project TR/ST, fronted by Robert Alfons. It was released on March 4, 2014 through Arts & Crafts Records in North America. The album debuted at No. 12 on the Billboard Dance/Electronic Albums chart.

Three singles were released to promote the album: "Rescue, Mister", "Capitol" and "Are We Arc?", all accompanied by music videos.

== Development ==
The album was developed solely by Robert Alfons since Austra's Maya Postepski left TR/ST shortly after the release of their debut studio album. Joyland was "written in different places in the world while touring" as opposed to the first album which was primarily developed in Toronto. In Alfons' opinion that made a big difference, because the album was now influenced by the vast "energy from the live shows" and a boost of self-confidence. Alfons also states that this boost has led him to be "a bit more playful with many aspects of the record", especially his vocals.

== Composition ==
Joyland is described as synth-pop, cold wave, dark wave, EBM and futurepop. The album's sound is "gallant, atmospheric, desirably ostentatious," "often brave" and "lugubrious." Joyland's beats and synths have been described as having a "hollow sheen."

Robert Alfons listed video game soundtracks, acid house and early techno music, Kate Bush, Elizabeth Fraser from the Cocteau Twins and Lee Hazlewood as influences for Joyland. The artist pointed out that on the album, he is "taking risks with vocals, and certain instrumentations, and sounds [he] hated in the past but now embrace[s]."

Unlike TRST (2012), the album was produced, written and engineered solely by Alfons, whereas TR/ST's debut album was created in a collaboration with Maya Postepski.

== Artwork ==
The artwork for Joyland has been created by Jenn Kitagawa alongside Robert Alfons and Seth Fluker. Alfons stated that the idea behind the cover was "something like a racetrack. Like a race in a video game."

== Critical reception ==
Professional ratings
Aggregate scores
Source	Rating
Metacritic	72/100
Review scores
Source	Rating
AllMusic	4/5 stars
Consequence of Sound	B−
DIY	4/5 stars
Exclaim!	8/10
The Guardian	3/5 stars
The Line of Best Fit	7.5/10
MusicOMH	4/5 stars
Pitchfork	6.8/10
The Skinny	4/5 stars
Under the Radar	7/10

Joyland received generally positive reviews. At Metacritic, which assigns a normalised rating out of 100 to reviews from mainstream publications, the album received an average score of 72, based on 13 reviews. MusicOMH praised the album by stating that "Joyland does an excellent job of sharpening and streamlining Trust’s sound into something even better than that displayed on the debut." Pitchfork gave the album a score of 6.8, concluding that it shares "many similarities" in comparison to Trust's previous record, TRST (2012), but "little growth." Daniel Sylvester of Exclaim! opined, "Although a few tracks ("Geryon," "Four Gut") suffer from muddy and unfocused melodies, there are far too many great ideas, quirky earworms and sonic peaks to give any critic reason to lampoon the title of this well-conceived, well-executed album."

== Track listing ==
All tracks are written by Robert Alfons.

No.	Title	Length
1.	"Slightly Floating"	3:34
2.	"Geryon"	4:23
3.	"Capitol"	4:53
4.	"Joyland"	3:18
5.	"Are We Arc?"	3:48
6.	"Icabod"	4:29
7.	"Four Gut"	5:11
8.	"Rescue, Mister"	4:31
9.	"Lost Souls/Eelings"	4:33
10.	"Peer Pressure"	5:20
11.	"Barely"	5:25
Total length:		50:04

Mexican digital bonus track
No.	Title	Length
12.	"Mar"	3:03
Total length:		53:07

== Personnel ==
Credits adapted from the liner notes of Joyland.

=== Musician ===
- Robert Alfons – vocals

=== Technical personnel ===
- Robert Alfons – engineering, production
- Damian Taylor – mixing
- Emily Lazar – mastering
- Rich Morales – mastering assistance

=== Artwork ===
- Jenn Kitagawa – graphic design, layout
- Seth Fluker – photography
- Robert Alfons – cover photography, layout
