= The Destroyer (Part 2) =

Studio album by TR/ST
- Released: November 1, 2019
- Genre: Synth-pop
- Length: 29:22
- Label: Grouch
- Producer: Robert Alfons; Lars Stalfors; Damian Taylor; Maya Postepski

TR/ST chronology
The Destroyer (Part 1) (2019)	The Destroyer (Part 2) (2019)	Performance (2024)

Singles from The Destroyer (Part 1)
- 1. "Iris" Released: July 24, 2019; 2. "Destroyer" Released: August 30, 2019; 3. "The Stain" Released: September 19, 2019; 4. "Cor" Released: October 10, 2019

The Destroyer (Part 2) is the fourth studio album by Canadian electronic music project TR/ST, fronted by Robert Alfons. Released on November 1, 2019 through Alfons's Grouch record label, it is the second half of the two-part album with the same name; the first part, The Destroyer (Part 1), was released in April of the same year. The album features contributions from previous member Maya Postepski, as well as additional production from Lars Stalfors and Damian Taylor.

== Background and recording ==
Alfons stated that the recording of The Destroyer was largely delayed for "professional and personal" reasons; the singles "Bicep" and "Destroyer," latter of which was included on Part 2, were previously released as independent singles in 2017. Remarking that the most challenging aspect of recording new material was "overcoming the voice that says this isn't good enough," Alfons explained: "I knew I had material I was excited about, but I had to overcome the sort of cycle of darkness and disconnection in order to get to a place where I was going to feel strong enough to put this (music) out."

The Destroyer features contributions from musician Maya Postepski; Postepski previously left TR/ST after the release of their 2012 debut, Trst, to focus on her solo work. Previous collaborator Damian Taylor and record producer Lars Stalfors also provided additional production work on the record. Both parts were recorded during a variety of sessions in Los Angeles and Alfons's rural farmhouse in Ontario, with "the living plant world" of the latter acting as an inspiration. Alfons also did not initially conceptualize the record as a two-part album; he decided to divide the record into two parts after starting to assemble a track list and feeling that the tracks featured different "vibes and aesthetics."

== Music ==
The Destroyer (Part 2) is characterized as an album with "melancholic classic synth-pop [sound] and sluggish vocals." Susan Hansen of Clash noted that the record "focuses on industrial sonics as much as the use of ambient layers of contemporary electronic sounds." Alfons has considered The Destroyer (Part 2) as the "darker" part and summed up the release with the keyword "shame." On the sound of the record, he also noted: "I just I think that a lot of "The Destroyer – Part 2" is not as intense and into hard beats and dance music as the previous universe where the band has existed."

== Critical reception ==
Professional ratings
Review scores
Source	Rating
AllMusic	4/5 stars
Clash	7/10
Exclaim!	8/10

The Destroyer (Part 2) has generally received positive reviews from music critics. AllMusic critic Heather Phares thought that the record explores aftermath of the themes from the first part "with a subtler approach that's just as powerful in its softness." Phares further stated: "Along with providing more time and space for the album's emotional journey to resonate, it introduces exciting dimensions to Alfons' music that make the entire Destroyer project a satisfying and well-earned catharsis." Susan Hansen of Clash noted the "fluidity throughout the eight album tracks," describing the album as "space where elements of eighties music culture and electronic sounds of the same era forge a unique bond of immersion and depth." Exclaim!'s Jenna Mohammed called the record as "a dreamy synth-heavy powerhouse of an album" and remarked that "Alfrons' honesty and rawness makes The Destroyer - 2 endlessly playable."

== Track listing ==
All tracks are written by Robert Alfons, except track 8, written by Alfons and Maya Postepski.

The Destroyer (Part 2)
No.	Title	Producer(s)	Length
1.	"Enduring Chill"	Alfons; Lars Stalfors^{[a]}	2:40
2.	"Iris"	Alfons; Damian Taylor^{[a]}	5:18
3.	"Darling"	Alfons; Taylor^{[a]}	2:11
4.	"Cor"	Alfons; Stalfors^{[a]}	3:34
5.	"Destroyer"	Alfons; Taylor^{[a]}	3:12
6.	"Shame"	Alfons; Stalfors^{[a]}	2:18
7.	"The Stain"	Alfons; Taylor^{[a]}	3:43
8.	"Slow Burn"	Alfons; Postepski^{[b]}; Stalfors^{[a]}	6:26
Total length:			29:22

Notes

- ^{^[a]} signifies an additional producer.
- ^{^[b]} signifies a co-producer.

== Personnel ==
Album credits as adapted from liner notes.

- Robert Alfons – producer, performer
- Lars Stalfors – additional production, mixing (1, 4, 6, 8)
- Damian Taylor – additional production, mixing (2, 3, 5, 7)
- Maya Postepski – co-producer (8)
- Lia Braswell – live drums (2, 3, 5, 7)
- Joe LaPorta – mastering
- Davy Evans – cover art
- Ryan Thomas Ormsby – layout, design
