= Tasseomancy (band) =

Canadian experimental band

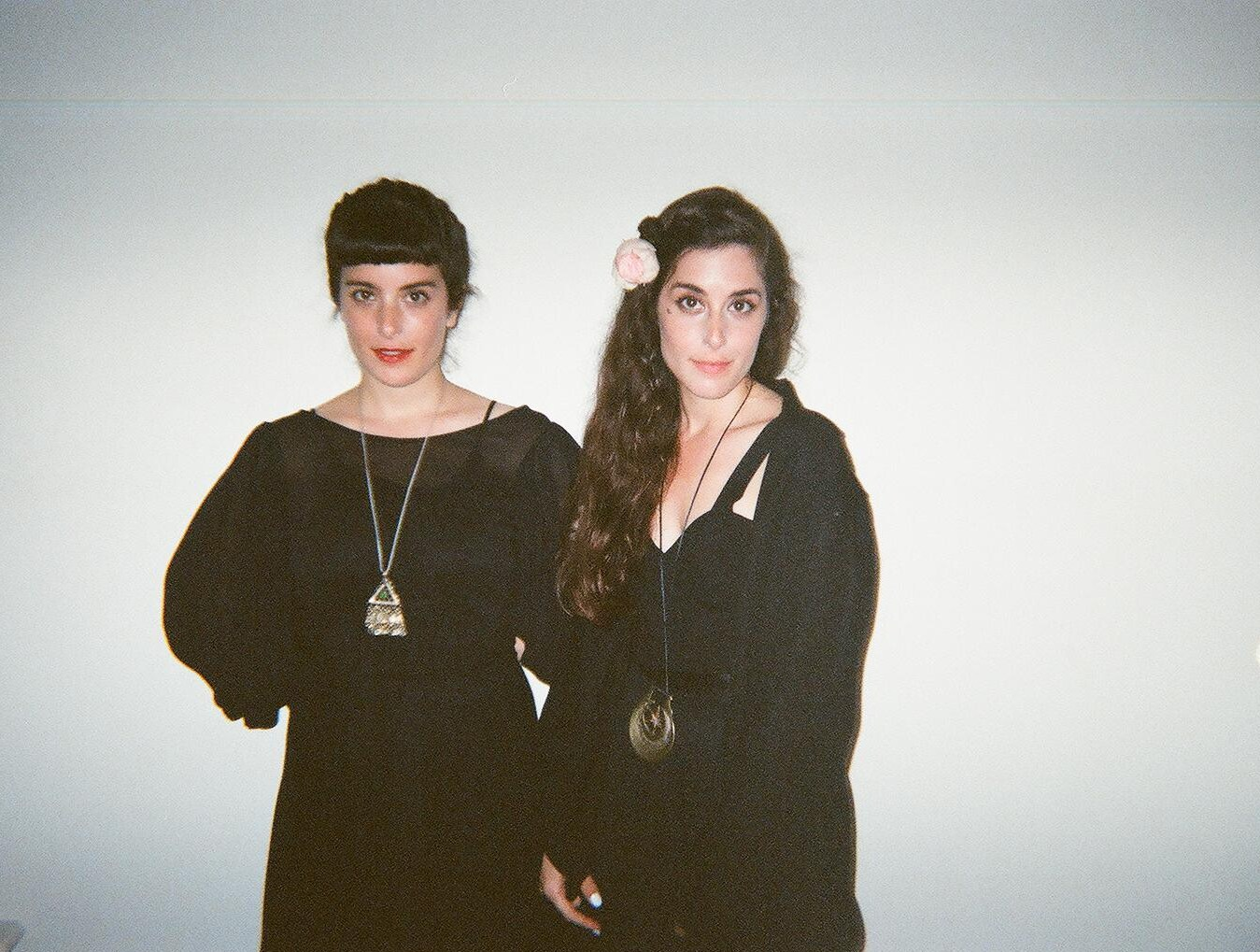
- Romy and Sari Lightman

Background information
- Also known as: Ghost Bees (2008–2010)
- Origin: Toronto, Ontario, Canada
- Genre: Experimental
- Years active: 2008–present
- Labels: Youth Club Records, Hype Lighter, Out of This Spark, Turf Records, Bella Union, Hand Drawn Dracula
- Members: Sari Lightman; Romy Lightman; Evan Cartwright
- Website: www.instagram.com/tasseo22//

Tasseomancy is a Canadian experimental band from Toronto formed by twin sisters Sari and Romy Lightman.

== Biography ==
Born in c. 1985 and raised in Toronto, the Lightman twins moved to Halifax to attend university. There the sisters began performing under the moniker Ghost Bees that they described as "experimental acoustic folk".

The duo released their debut EP Tasseomancy on April 8, 2008, via Youth Club Records as Ghost Bees. The pair toured around North America in support of the record.

As the Ghost Bees project developed, new sounds and influences not heard on the original EP began to be incorporated, prompting the change to Tasseomancy in 2010. Sari Lightman explained that "we wanted to have a link to our previous band and not dismiss it entirely. It’s a progression and we wanted to keep something from it". The sound moved away from acoustic folk to a more experimental and art pop oriented direction, and included flute and steel pan instruments. They released the 7" single Health Hands b/w The Darkness of Things on the Diamond Rings' boutique label Hype Lighter in 2010. They began performing in friend Katie Stelmanis' electronic outfit Austra as touring backing singers in the same year.

The duo recorded their debut full-length Ulalume under the new name that year. The title of the album was taken from an Edgar Allan Poe poem. It was released on Out of this Spark/Turf Records in August 2011. When performing live, the duo were supported by Maya Postepski (drums /keyboards).

The band released a five track Tasseotape cassette in 2013. In 2015 the duo released a second album, Palm Wine Revisited, on Toronto DIY label Healing Power Records, and toured the US with Braids. They were joined by Johnny Spence (keyboards) and Evan Cartwright (percussion).

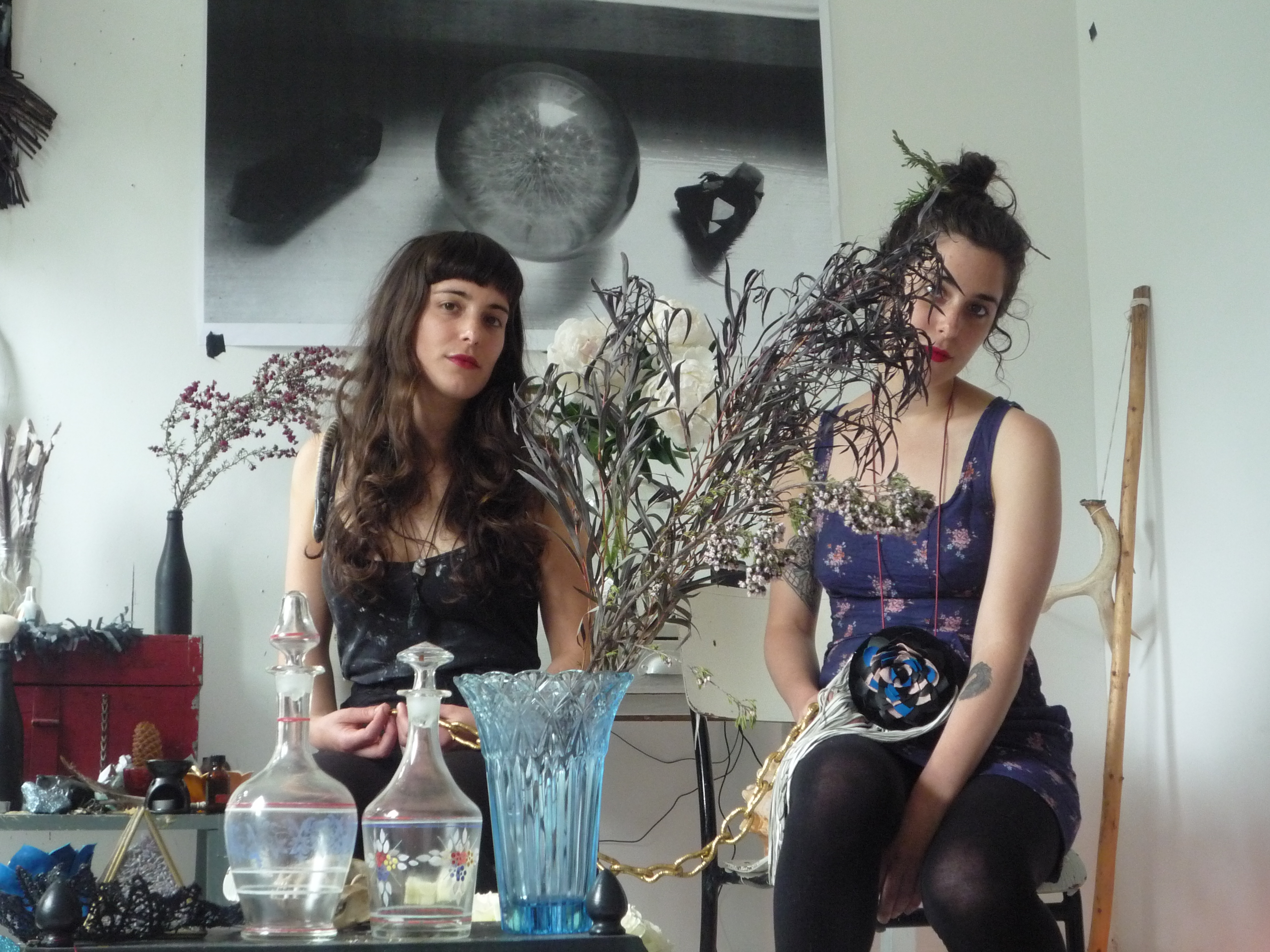
Sari and Romy Lightman while in Ghost Bees, in 2010 in Halifax

In November 2016 they released the 11 track album Do Easy, on label Bella Union in Europe, run by Simon Raymonde of the Cocteau Twins, and on Hand Drawn Dracula in Canada. The album featured bandmates Johnny Spence and Evan Cartwright, as well as Brodie West (alto-sax), Ryan Driver (flute) Simone Schmidt and Alex Cowan (Blue Hawaii). Do Easy was inspired by the domestic manifesto of William S. Burroughs, The Discipline of D.E. According to band member Romy Lightman, "Burroughs's doctrine on finding 'the easy way' struck me as something rare and I hung onto it like a piece of protection. Later on, I discovered that Genesis P-Orridge believed this text to be one of the greatest magic techniques for retraining the mind". Do Easy was met with critical acclaim from outlets such as Uncut, VICE i-d, noisey, The Line of Best Fit, MONOCLE, and The Guardian.

Do Easy's music videos were directed by video artist Charles Linden Ercoli, as well as the self directed "Missoula" video. The band toured Japan with Lydia Ainsworth, North America and Europe with Andy Shauf in 2017. They are currently working on a new album.

Romy Lightman's musical project, 'Lightman Jarvis Ecstatic Band' was a collaboration with musician Yves Jarvis. The duo's debut album is called Banned, and it's set to arrive on June 25, 2021 via Flemish Eye/ANTI-.

In December 2024, the Lightmans released a new record, Sister Smile, under a new band name, Lightman & Lightman. The album was conceived as an imagined spiritual dialogue between 20th century figures Etty Hillesum, who was murdered in 1943 at Auschwitz, and Jeanine Deckers.

== Name ==
The cover of the Tasseomancy EP featured a photograph of the sisters' great-great grandmother Clara Chernos, a Russian Jewish tea-leaf reader who moved to Canada in the 19th century during the Russian pogroms. When renaming the band in 2010, the sisters opted for the title of their debut EP, noting "We’re into tea and tea-making, our great great grandmother was a tea leaf reader and she passed it on to the rest of our family".

== Discography ==
=== Albums ===
- Ulalume (Out of This Spark / Turf, 2011)
- Palm Wine Revisited (2015)
- Do Easy (2016)

=== Singles ===
- "Healthy Hands" (2011)
- "Braid. Wind Is Coming" (2013)
- "Missoula" (2016)
- "Do Easy" (2016)
- "29 Palms" (2016)

=== As Ghost Bees ===
- Tasseomancy (2008)
