= The Destroyer (Part 1) =

2019 studio album by TR/ST

Studio album by TR/ST
- Released: April 19, 2019
- Genres: Industrial; experimental; cold wave
- Length: 31:49
- Labels: Royal Mountain; Grouch
- Producers: Robert Alfons; Maya Postepski; Lars Stalfors

TR/ST chronology
Joyland (2014)	The Destroyer (Part 1) (2019)	The Destroyer (Part 2) (2019)

Singles from The Destroyer (Part 1)
- 1. "Bicep" Released: July 13, 2017; 2. "Gone" Released: February 5, 2019; 3. "Unbleached" Released: February 21, 2019; 4. "Grouch" Released: March 21, 2019; 5. "Colossal" Released: April 4, 2019; 6. "Control Me" Released: April 19, 2019

The Destroyer (Part 1) is the third studio album by Canadian electronic music project TR/ST, fronted by Robert Alfons. It is the first half of the two-part album with the same title. It was released on April 19, 2019, by Royal Mountain Records and his own record label Grouch. The album features contributions from Maya Postepski, his collaborator on TR/ST's debut studio album, TRST, as well as Lars Stalfors and Damian Taylor. It is his first release in which he is not credited as Trust.

The second part of the album, The Destroyer (Part 2), was released on November 1, 2019.

== Background and release ==
After the end of the tour supporting his last album, Joyland, Alfons started to work on his third studio album. He commented that "after the first and second record and touring, I was really sort of depleted and I definitely needed to regroup." The artist described the process of creating the album as "healing myself and then experimenting with different ideas about what a song I would put out would be."

In July 2017, Alfons released "Bicep", the first single promoting the album.

On February 5, 2019, Alfons announced the third studio album, alongside its title, release date, artwork and tracklist. On the same day, he released the album's second single, "Gone".

On February 21, 2019, Alfons released the third single off The Destroyer – Part 1, "Unbleached", that was premiered on The Fader, followed by the fourth single, "Grouch", released a month later.

The fifth single, "Colossal", was premiered on BrooklynVegan on April 4, 2019. It is one of the five tracks that Robert Alfons worked on with his collaborator from TR/ST's debut album, Maya Postepski. Alfons commented that the song is "such a special collab" and added that it was written "while in different parts of the world."

== Composition ==
The Destroyer (Part 1) is an industrial, experimental music and cold wave album.

== Promotion ==
To promote the album, Alfons was on a tour in Europe and North America that began on April 9, 2019.

Date	City	Country	Venue
April 9, 2019	London	England	The Steel Yard
April 11, 2019	Barcelona	Spain	Razzmatazz
April 12, 2019	Madrid	Spain	Sala Caracol
April 13, 2019	Paris	France	Le Bababoum
April 15, 2019	Amsterdam	Netherlands	Bitterzoet
April 17, 2019	Copenhagen	Denmark	Vega
April 19, 2019	Berlin	Germany	Urban Spree
April 20, 2019	St. Petersburg	Russia	MOD
April 21, 2019	Moscow	Russia	Pluton
April 26, 2019	Toronto	Canada	Phoenix Concert Theatre
April 27, 2019	Montreal	Canada	Corona Theatre
May 1, 2019	Boston	United States	Brighton Music Hall
May 3, 2019	Brooklyn	United States	Elsewhere
May 4, 2019	Philadelphia	United States	Underground Arts
May 5, 2019	Washington	United States	U Street Music Hall
May 9, 2019	Detroit	United States	El Club
May 10, 2019	Chicago	United States	Lincoln Hall
May 11, 2019	Minneapolis	United States	Fine Line Music Cafe
May 14, 2019	Portland	United States	Wonder Ballroom
May 15, 2019	Seattle	United States	Neumos
May 17, 2019	San Francisco	United States	Great American Music Hall
May 18, 2019	Los Angeles	United States	The Fonda Theatre
June 7–9, 2019	Austin	United States	Austin Terror Fest

== Critical reception ==
Professional ratings
Review scores
Source	Rating
AllMusic	4/5 stars
Exclaim!	7/10
The 405	7/10

The Destroyer (Part 1) received positive reviews. Heather Phares of AllMusic opined that "it's Alfons' most accomplished work yet" and compared it to project's previous releases as a "more calculated work". She added that the album is "both ambitious and intimate, and the care Alfons took in making and introducing the album to the world via a slow trickle of singles also extends to its craft", while rating it 4 out of 5. Kamryn Feigel of Slug described the album as "unique twist on experimental music" and added that it's "industrial, dark and danceable, all at once."

Lisa Sookraj of Exclaim! rated the album 7 out of 10 while writing in her review that The Destroyer (Part 1) "offers less consistently urgent, fat danceability than previous TR/ST releases, but it is equally passionate and alluring" and called it "mature." In his review for The 405, Francisco Gonçalves Silva declared that Alfons "constructed a narrative that represents him and shines a light into his perseverance and determination to accept his thoughts, come clean and now being ready for a new beginning."

== Track listing ==
All tracks are written by Robert Alfons and Maya Postepski, except tracks 2, 4 and 7, written by Alfons.

No.	Title	Producer(s)	Length
1.	"Colossal"	Alfons; Postepski^{[a]}; Lars Stalfors^{[b]}	5:10
2.	"Gone"	Alfons; Stalfors^{[a]}	3:35
3.	"Unbleached"	Alfons; Postepski^{[a]}; Stalfors^{[b]}	3:38
4.	"Bicep"	Alfons; Damian Taylor^{[b]}	4:37
5.	"Grouch"	Alfons; Postepski^{[a]}; Stalfors^{[b]}	3:33
6.	"Poorly Coward"	Alfons; Postepski^{[a]}; Stalfors^{[b]}	3:56
7.	"Control Me"	Alfons; Stalfors^{[a]}	3:54
8.	"Wake With"	Alfons; Postepski^{[a]}	3:26

Notes

- ^{^[a]} signifies a co-producer.
- ^{^[b]} signifies an additional producer.

== Personnel ==
Credits adapted from the liner notes of The Destroyer (Part 1).

Musicians

- Robert Alfons – vocals
- Lia Braswell – live drums (track 4)

Technical personnel

- Robert Alfons – production
- Maya Postepski – co-production (tracks: 1, 3, 5, 6, 8)
- Lars Stalfors – co-production (tracks: 2, 7); additional production (tracks: 1, 3, 5–7); mixing (tracks: 1–3, 5–8)
- Damian Taylor – additional production, mixing (track 4)
- Joe LaPorta – mastering

Artwork

- Eliot Lee Hazel – photography
- Ryan Thomas Ormsby – layout, design
- Blake Amstrong – painting
