= Super Bowl Sunday (disambiguation) =

Super Bowl Sunday is the day during which the NFL’s annual Super Bowl championship game is played.

Super Bowl Sunday may also refer to:

- Super Bowl Sunday (This Is Us), an episode from an American television drama series
- Super Bowl Sunday (video game), a 1985 video game
- Super Bowl Sunday (song), a song by the band Maps and Atlases from their album Lightlessness is Nothing New
