= Cigarette Girl =

A cigarette girl is someone who peddles or provides cigarettes in a casino, restaurant, theatre, or similar setting.

Cigarette Girl may also refer to:

- Cigarette Girl (1947 film), an American film
- Cigarette Girl (2009 film), an American film
- The Cigarette Girl, a 1917 American silent drama film
- Cigarette Girl (TV series), a 2023 Indonesian Netflix series
- Cigarette Girl (manga), a manga by Masahiko Matsumoto

== See also ==
- The Cigarette Girl from Mosselprom, a 1924 Soviet silent comedy film
- The Cigarette Girl from the Future, an album by Beauty Pill
