= Fall Apart =

Fall Apart may refer to:

- "Fall Apart", a song by Sarah Connor from her 2008 album Sexy as Hell
- "Fall Apart", a song by Maps & Atlases from their 2018 album Lightlessness Is Nothing New
- "Fall Apart", a song by Tones and I from her 2021 album Welcome to the Madhouse
- "Fall Apart", a 2021 song by Renforshort
- "Fall Apart", a song by Kali Uchis from her 2025 album Sincerely

== See also ==
- Falls Apart (disambiguation)
