= Olympia (Austra album) =

Studio album by Austra
- Released: June 17, 2013
- Studios: Key Club (Benton Harbor, Michigan) (Note: Except "Forgive Me"); Soma (Chicago); Electrical Audio (Chicago); Candle Recording (Toronto) (Note: "Forgive Me"); Golden Ratio (Montreal) (Note: Vocal recording)
- Genres: Synth-pop; house
- Length: 45:44
- Label: Domino
- Producer: Austra

Austra chronology
Feel It Break (2011)	Olympia (2013)	Future Politics (2017)

Singles from Olympia
- 1. "Home" Released: March 7, 2013; 2. "Painful Like" Released: May 30, 2013; 3. "Forgive Me" Released: November 26, 2013

Olympia is the second studio album by Canadian electronic music band Austra, released on June 17, 2013, by Domino. Olympia spawned three singles: "Home", "Painful Like" and "Forgive Me". The album received largely positive reviews from critics, who said that it had more "bombastic throb" compared to its predecessor while still showcasing lead singer Katie Stelmanis's "classically trained, massive voice", adding that it was "clean, considered, with every detail in its place and a clear sense of its own identity."

== Background and development ==
In an interview for the music blog Stereogum, Stelmanis said that she began writing Olympia while still touring in support of the band's debut studio album, Feel It Break. According to her, writing Olympia took about a year, and the actual recording, in the studio in Michigan, four to five weeks. Her vocals were recorded in Montreal with Damian Taylor and then sent to be mixed to Tom Elmhirst. Stelmanis told Interview magazine that the album is titled after the newborn child of the owners of the studio where they recorded, where Austra was "the first band into the studio after the baby was born".

She also told Stereogum that the band was more focused on the quality of the sound than before and that every song on Olympia "was hand-picked in a very thoughtful way." On various occasions she noted that Olympia was a more collaborative record than its predecessor, which, in her own words, "was pretty much a bedroom project".

Stelmanis states that the primary inspiration for Olympia were the "early house music tracks" like "Chicago house and Detroit" and Marshall Jefferson's song "Move Your Body" in particular to which Stelmanis was listening to a lot. She was inspired by the fact that such music, according to her, was created without any electronic instruments and therefore actually played (as opposed to computer-generated music where computers generate the sounds of the composition – which was also the case with their previous album Feel It Break). This inspired the band to play live instruments, therefore Olympia has a more organic and natural feel. Stelmanis also cited Portishead's album Third as an influence.

== Critical reception ==
Professional ratings
Aggregate scores
Source	Rating
AnyDecentMusic?	7.5/10
Metacritic	76/100
Review scores
Source	Rating
AllMusic	4/5 stars
Clash	8/10
Consequence of Sound	4/5 stars
Drowned in Sound	8/10
Exclaim!	9/10
The Guardian	4/5 stars
NME	7/10
Now	3/5 Ns
Paste	7.0/10
Pitchfork	7.2/10

Olympia received generally positive reviews from music critics. At Metacritic, which assigns a normalized rating out of 100 to reviews from mainstream publications, the album received an average score of 76, based on 26 reviews.

The album was a longlisted nominee for the 2014 Polaris Music Prize.

== Track listing ==
All tracks are written by Austra.

No.	Title	Length
1.	"What We Done?"	5:00
2.	"Forgive Me"	3:20
3.	"Painful Like"	3:59
4.	"Sleep"	4:32
5.	"Home"	4:15
6.	"Fire"	4:42
7.	"I Don't Care (I'm a Man)"	1:11
8.	"We Become"	4:22
9.	"Reconcile"	3:31
10.	"Annie (Oh Muse, You)"	3:47
11.	"You Changed My Life"	3:11
12.	"Hurt Me Now"	3:54
Total length:		45:44

iTunes Store bonus track
No.	Title	Length
13.	"Mayan Drums" (with Gina X)	3:41
Total length:		49:25

== Personnel ==
Credits adapted from the liner notes of Olympia.

=== Austra ===
- Katie Stelmanis – vocals, synths, programming, piano, recorder
- Maya Postepski – keyboards, programming, percussion, drums, marimba, organ
- Dorian Wolf – bass, synth

=== Additional musicians ===
- Romy Lightman – backing vocals
- Sari Lightman – backing vocals
- Ryan Wonsiak – saxophone, keyboards
- Alia Hamdon-O'Brien – flute
- Anna-Sophia Vukovich – violin
- Ewan Kay – trombone

=== Technical ===
- Austra – production
- Mike Haliechuk – additional production
- Bill Skibbe – recording (tracks 1, 3–12)
- Leon Taheny – recording (track 2); additional recording (all tracks)
- Damian Taylor – vocal production, vocal recording
- Tom Elmhirst – mixing
- Ben Baptie – mix engineering
- Joe Visciano – mixing assistance
- Guy Davie – mastering

=== Artwork ===
- Norman Wong – all photography

== Charts ==
Chart performance for Olympia
Chart (2013)	Peak position
Austrian Albums (Ö3 Austria)	42
Belgian Albums (Ultratop Flanders)	167
German Albums (Offizielle Top 100)	73
Irish Independent Albums (IRMA)	20
Swiss Albums (Schweizer Hitparade)	93
UK Albums (Official Charts)	183
UK Independent Albums (Official Charts)	37
US Heatseekers Albums (Billboard)	9
US Independent Albums (Billboard)	48
US Top Dance Albums (Billboard)	14

== Release history ==
Release history for Olympia
Region	Date	Label	Ref.
Various	June 17, 2013	Domino	
Canada	June 18, 2013	Paper Bag	
United States	June 18, 2013	Domino	
