= Tree, Swallows, Houses =

EP by Maps & Atlases
- Released: September 10, 2007
- Length: 24:07
- Label: Sargent House

Maps & Atlases chronology
Split EP with The Antenora	Tree, Swallows, Houses	You and Me and the Mountain EP

Professional ratings
Review scores
Source	Rating
AllMusic	4/5 stars
Sputnikmusic	4/5

Tree, Swallows, Houses is an EP by the alternative rock band Maps & Atlases. It was released in 2007 on Sargent House.

== Critical reception ==
The Chicago Tribune wrote that the album's "herky-jerky songs extend Chicago's noisy indie-rock tradition." Drowned in Sound called it "exhilarating," writing that it is full of "wheezing melodic splutters and elasticated yelps." The Aquarian wrote that it "settles into a continuously unwinding 'math rock' mosaic."

== Track listing ==
Original release
No.	Title	Length
1.	"Everyplace Is a House"	3:58
2.	"The Most Trustworthy Tin Cans"	3:58
3.	"The Ongoing Horrible"	2:05
4.	"Big Bopper Anthems"	4:42
5.	"Stories About Ourselves"	3:45
6.	"The Sounds They Make"	1:31
7.	"Songs for Ghosts to Haunt to"	4:08
