= Beauty Pill Describes Things as They Are =

Studio album by Beauty Pill
- Released: April 21, 2015
- Recorded: 2011
- Genre: Electronic, rock
- Producer: Chad Clark

Beauty Pill chronology
The Unsustainable Lifestyle (2004)	Beauty Pill Describes Things as They Are (2015)

Beauty Pill Describes Things as They Are is the second full-length CD by the band Beauty Pill. It was the band's first non-Dischord release. It was recorded at Artisphere, a museum in Arlington, VA, as part of a commissioned art project called Immersive Ideal in which the recording sessions were conducted in view of the public. They completed one song per day, and Chad Clark felt the pressure of the recording process infused the music with an energetic quality. The music is more electronic in nature than the band's previous recordings because Clark's health issues prevented him from lifting a guitar for a time.

== Critical reception ==
Professional ratings
Review scores
Source	Rating
Pitchfork	7.5/10
Tom Hull – on the Web	B+
Vice (Expert Witness)	A

The album was met with wide critical acclaim. NPR listed it as one of the 50 Best Albums of 2015, and Rolling Stone listed it as one of the "15 Best Albums You Didn't Hear in 2015". Magnet Magazine declared it album of the year, and said it "Takes a sledgehammer to boundaries and orthodoxies. Recalls both 'Revolver' and 'Stankonia.'"

Noisey declared it "One of the most unique and engrossing albums of 2015", while Pitchfork characterized it as "a smorgasbord of angles, melodies, loops, pockets, and fractal surfaces that nonetheless refuse to deviate from the mythic power of the pop hook."

Robert Christgau named it the seventh best album of 2015.

== Track listing ==
1. "Drapetomania!" – 3:36
2. "Afrikaner Barista" – 6:42
3. "Ann the Word" – 6:44
4. "Steven & Tiwonge" – 4:24
5. "Aint a Jury in the World Gon' Convict You, Baby" – 4:00
6. "Exit Without Saving" – 3:42
7. "The Prize" – 4:23
8. "Dog with Rabbit in Mouth, Unharmed" – 5:22
9. "For Pretend" – 4:51
10. "When Cornered" – 3:30
11. "Near Miss Stories" – 5:45
12. "Ann the Word" (Lungfish cover) – 7:10

== Personnel ==
- Basla Andolsun – bass, guitar
- Chad Clark – vocals, guitar, beats, sounds, treatments, songs
- Jean Cook – vocals, strings, Wurlitzer, piano, synthesizer
- Drew Doucette – guitar, bass
- Abram Goodrich – drums, guitar, bass, synthesizer, vibraphone, percussion
- Devin Ocampo – drums, guitar, synthesizer, bass
