= Austra (band) =

Canadian electronic music band

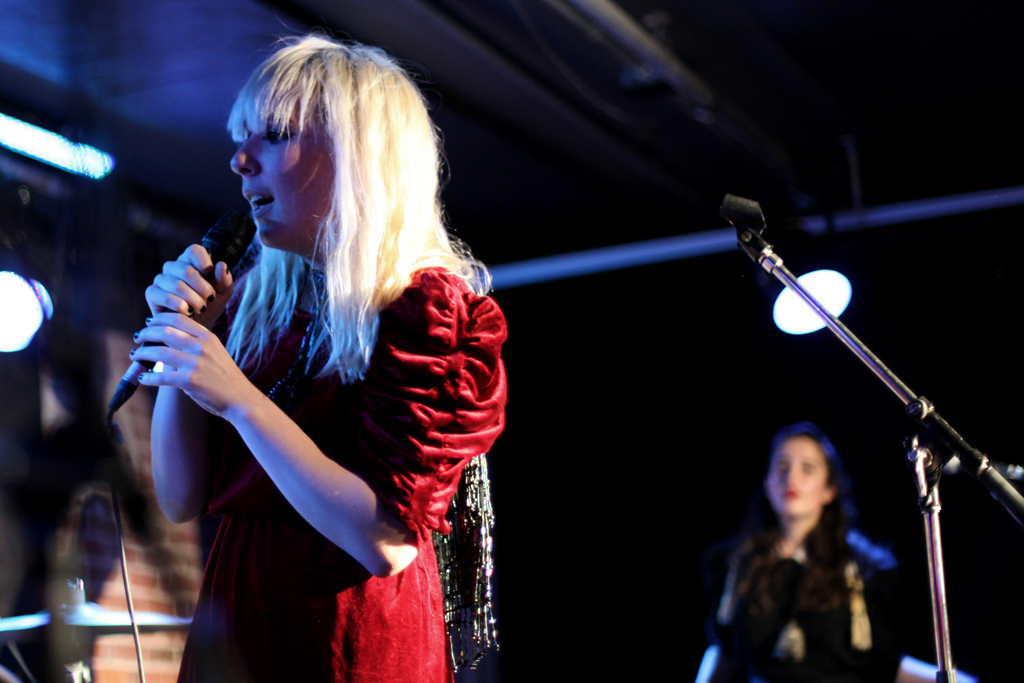
- Austra performing in 2011

Background information
- Origin: Toronto, Canada
- Genres: Electronica; synth-pop; new wave; dark wave; art pop
- Years active: 2009–present
- Labels: One Big Silence; Domino; Paper Bag; Pink Fizz
- Members: Katie Stelmanis
- Past members: Romy Lightman; Sari Lightman; Maya Postepski; Dorian Wolf; Ryan Wonsiak; Carmen Elle
- Website: austra.fyi

Austra is a Canadian electronic music band from Toronto, founded in 2009 by composer, singer-songwriter, and producer Katie Stelmanis. Stelmanis is the only permanent member of the project, with a rotating live band that has included Maya Postepski (drums), Dorian Wolf (bass, Moog), and Ryan Wonsiak (keyboards). It previously also featured the twin backing singers Sari and Romy Lightman of Tasseomancy. The band has released five studio albums—Feel It Break (2011), Olympia (2013), Future Politics (2017), Hirudin (2020) and Chin Up Buttercup (2025).

== History ==
=== Formation and early years ===
In 2004, Stelmanis and Postepski played in a band called Galaxy, together with Emma McKenna. At the same time, Stelmanis started making electronic music at home and was also writing industrial-inspired soundtracks for performance artist Zeesy Powers. Powers convinced her to start performing her songs live, and in 2008 Stelmanis' debut album Join Us, which appeared under her own name, was released through Blocks Recording Club. She toured Europe with Postepski on drums and xylosynth. In 2009, Stelmanis decided to change the name of the project from her own in order to increase her bandmates' visibility, and because she felt too many people were mistaking the project for being an acoustic-folk act.

In 2010, Stelmanis recruited Dorian Wolf and Carmen Elle as live members. The band played the South by South West festival in Austin, Texas, under the name Private Life. An A&R from Domino Records saw the show and Stelmanis subsequently signed a record deal with the label. After learning the band name Private Life was taken, Stelmanis decided to use her middle name, Austra, which is also the name of the goddess of light in Latvian mythology.

=== 2011–2013: Feel It Break ===
Austra's debut studio album, Feel It Break was released on May 11, 2011, by Domino Records, and May 17, 2011, in Canada by Paper Bag Records. The album was shortlisted for the 2011 Polaris Music Prize. Feel It Break was included on several year-end critics' lists; notably, both the Toronto Star and New York named it the best album of 2011, with the former calling it "an outright stunner". Stereogum named Austra a Band to Watch in March 2011. Stelmanis wrote and produced all the tracks on the album. Maya added additional production on Lose It, The Future, The Choke and The Villain. The record was mixed by Damian Taylor in Montreal.

=== 2013–2017: Olympia and Future Politics ===
Their second album Olympia was released on June 18, 2013. It was preceded by the lead single "Home", released on March 7, 2013. It was described as "a personal song cycle about loss and gender dynamics". Their third album Future Politics was released on January 20, 2017. For the record, Stelmanis spent time in Mexico where she was introduced to electro cumbia while house, dance and techno music influenced the writing for the album. Lyrically, Stelmanis was inspired by the book Inventing the Future: Postcapitalism and a World Without Work by Nick Srnicek and Alex Williams and The Accelerationist Manifesto. She indicated that the material for the record had been written before the political events in the second half of 2016.

=== 2018–present: Hirudin and Chin Up Buttercup ===
In 2020, Austra released the album Hirudin, which Pitchfork called "the most dynamic of Austra's albums". It was produced by Rodaidh McDonald and features contributions from Cecile Believe and Joseph Shabason. Their fifth studio album, Chin Up Buttercup, was released after a five-year gap in November 2025.

== Discography ==
=== Studio albums ===
Title	Details	Peak chart positions								
Title	Details	AUT	BEL (FL)	BEL (WA)	GER	SWI	UK	US Dance	US Heat	US Indie
Feel It Break	Released: May 13, 2011; Label: Domino; Formats: CD, LP, digital download	—	—	—	—	—	—	—	22	—
Olympia	Released: June 17, 2013; Label: Domino; Formats: CD, LP, digital	42	167	—	73	93	183	14	9	48
Future Politics	Released: January 20, 2017; Label: Domino; Formats: CD, LP, digital	36	98	180	61	46	—	19	7	27
Hirudin	Released: May 1, 2020; Label: Domino; Formats: CD, LP, digital, streaming	—	—	—	—	—	—	—	—	—
Chin Up Buttercup	Released: November 14, 2025; Label: Domino; Formats: CD, LP, digital, streaming	—	—	—	—	—	—	—	—	—
"—" denotes a recording that did not chart or was not released in that territory.

=== Remix albums ===
- Sparkle (2011)

=== EPs ===
- Beat and the Pulse (2010)
- Habitat (2014)

=== Singles ===
- "Lose It" (2011)
- "Spellwork" (2011)
- "Home" (2013)
- "Painful Like" (2013)
- "Forgive Me" (2013)
- "Hurt Me Now" (2014)
- "Habitat" (2014)
- "American Science" (2014)
- "Utopia" (2016)
- "Future Politics" (2016)
- "I Love You More Than You Love Yourself" (2017)
- "Change the Paradigm" (2017)
- "Risk It" (2020)
- "Anywayz" (2020)
- "I Am Not Waiting" (2020)
- "Math Equation" (2025)
- "Siren Song" (2025)
- "Fallen Cloud" (2025)
