= Hirudin (album) =

Studio album by Austra
- Released: May 1, 2020
- Genre: Electronic
- Length: 33:47
- Label: Domino
- Producer: Katie Stelmanis; Rodaidh McDonald; Joseph Shabason

Austra chronology
Future Politics (2017)	Hirudin (2020)

Singles from Hirudin
- 1. "Risk It" Released: January 29, 2020; 2. "Anywayz" Released: March 5, 2020; 3. "Mountain Baby" Released: April 16, 2020; 4. "I Am Not Waiting" Released: June 12, 2020

Hirudin (stylized as HiRUDiN) is the fourth studio album by Canadian electronic music band Austra, released on May 1, 2020, by Domino worldwide and by Pink Fizz Records in Canada.

== Critical reception ==
Professional ratings
Aggregate scores
Source	Rating
Metacritic	73/100
Review scores
Source	Rating
AllMusic	4/5 stars
Beats Per Minute	80%
DIY	3.5/5 stars
Exclaim!	7/10
Our Culture Mag	3.5/5 stars
Pitchfork	7.3/10

Hirudin was met with generally favorable reviews from critics. At Metacritic, which assigns a weighted average rating out of 100 to reviews from mainstream publications, this release received an average score of 73, based on 11 reviews.

== Track listing ==
All tracks are written by Katie Stelmanis, except tracks 1 and 8, written by Stelmanis and Cecile Believe

No.	Title	Producer(s)	Length
1.	"Anywayz"	Stelmanis; Rodaidh McDonald; Joseph Shabason	3:46
2.	"All I Wanted"	Stelmanis; McDonald; Shabason	3:19
3.	"How Did You Know?"	Stelmanis; McDonald; Shabason	4:20
4.	"Your Family"	Stelmanis; McDonald	1:42
5.	"Risk It"	Stelmanis; McDonald; Shabason	3:38
6.	"Interlude I"	Stelmanis	0:28
7.	"It’s Amazing"	Stelmanis; McDonald; Shabason	4:18
8.	"Mountain Baby" (featuring Cecile Believe)	Stelmanis; McDonald	3:27
9.	"I Am Not Waiting"	Stelmanis; McDonald	4:34
10.	"Interlude II"	Stelmanis	0:34
11.	"Messiah"	Stelmanis; McDonald	3:41
Total length:			33:47
