= Living Decorations EP =

Living Decorations

Studio album by Maps & Atlases
- Released: March 1, 2011
- Genre: Alternative rock
- Length: 19:13
- Label: Barsuk Records

Maps & Atlases chronology
Perch Patchwork (2010)	Living Decorations (2011)	Beware and Be Grateful (2012)

Living Decorations is an extended play album by the Chicago indie rock group Maps & Atlases, released in 2011 by Barsuk Records. It was an iTunes exclusive released shortly after their debut LP Perch Patchwork. A video directed by Erin Elders, the band's lead guitarist, was released for the title track. The EP features previously unreleased remixes as well as a live track.

== Track listing ==
Original release
No.	Title	Length
1.	"Living Decorations"	2:54
2.	"Solid Ground (Live At Electraplay)"	4:26
3.	"Pigeon (Andreas Lust Remix)"	4:15
4.	"Living Decorations (Friendly Ghost Remix)"	4:15
5.	"Perch Patchwork (Josh Morissey Remix)"	3:23
