= You and Me and the Mountain =

EP by Maps & Atlases
- Released: July 8, 2008
- Length: 17:29
- Label: Sargent House

Maps & Atlases chronology
Tree, Swallows, Houses	You and Me and the Mountain	Perch Patchwork

Professional ratings
Review scores
Source	Rating
AllMusic	3/5 stars

You and Me and the Mountain is an EP by Maps & Atlases, released in 2008 on the Sargent House label.

== Track listing ==
Original release
No.	Title	Length
1.	"Witch"	3:23
2.	"Artichokes"	2:55
3.	"You And Me And The Mountain"	3:46
4.	"Daily News"	4:09
5.	"Ted Zancha"	3:16
