= You Are Right to Be Afraid =

You AreRight to Be Afraid

Studio album by Beauty Pill
- Released: 2003
- Genre: Indie rock
- Length: 15:08
- Label: Dischord Records
- Producer: Beauty Pill

Beauty Pill chronology
The Cigarette Girl From the Future (2001)	You AreRight to Be Afraid (2003)	The Unsustainable Lifestyle (2004)

Professional ratings
Review scores
Source	Rating
AllMusic	3.5/5 stars

You Are Right to Be Afraid is the second release by Indie rock band Beauty Pill. It was released in 2003 on Dischord Records.

== Track listing ==
1. "The Ballad of Leron And Lele" - 0:34
2. "Copyists" - 2:34
3. "You Are Right To Be Afraid" - 3:47
4. "Quote Devout Unquote" - 5:11
5. "You, Yes You" - 3:05

== Personnel ==
- Chad Clark - Vocals & Guitar
- Ryan Nelson - Drums & Guitar
- Basla Andolsun - Bass
- Drew Doucette - Guitar
- Rachel Burke - Vocals, Wurlitzer
