= Trans-Love Energies =

Trans-Love Energies may refer to:

- Trans-Love Energies (organization), a medical marijuana compassion center in Detroit, Michigan
- Trans-Love Energies (album), a 2011 album by Death in Vegas
