= Falls Apart =

Falls Apart may refer to:

- "Falls Apart" (Sugar Ray song), 1998
- "Falls Apart" (Thousand Foot Krutch song), 2007
- "Falls Apart", a 1996 song by Stabbing Westward, from the album Wither Blister Burn & Peel
- "Falls Apart", a 2007 song by Hurt, from the album Vol. 1

== See also ==
- Everything Falls Apart, the second 1983 album by Hüsker Dü
- "When It All Falls Apart", the third single from The Veronicas' debut 2006 album The Secret Life of...
- Fall Apart (disambiguation)
