= Beware and Be Grateful =

Studio album by Maps & Atlases
- Released: April 17, 2012
- Length: 42:44
- Label: Barsuk Records

Maps & Atlases chronology
Living Decorations EP (2011)	Beware and Be Grateful (2012)	Lightlessness Is Nothing New (2018)

Beware and Be Grateful is the second studio album by Maps & Atlases, released in 2012 by Barsuk Records.

== Track listing ==
Original release
No.	Title	Length
1.	"Old & Gray"	5:44
2.	"Fever"	5:05
3.	"Winter"	4:32
4.	"Remote & Dark Years"	2:49
5.	"Silver Self"	6:31
6.	"Vampires"	2:43
7.	"Be Three Years Old"	3:08
8.	"Bugs"	3:11
9.	"Old Ash"	5:05
10.	"Important"	3:56

== Reception ==
Professional ratings
Aggregate scores
Source	Rating
Metacritic	71/100
Review scores
Source	Rating
AllMusic	4/5 stars
The A.V. Club	B+
Paste Magazine	7.7/10
Slant	4.5/5 stars

The album has a score of 71 out of 100 on Metacritic based on 20 critic reviews, indicating "generally favorable" reception.

In a positive review for The A.V. Club, Chris Mincher highlighted the record's "fluidity," "airy harmonies, polyrhythmic melodies, and inventive time-signature experiments," stating that "Beware and Be Grateful has plenty to please both casual listeners and angular-prog purists (assuming such people exist)."

Conversely, a review from NME weighed Beware and Be Grateful's technical aspects and layered songwriting against its emotive capacity:

"Maps & Atlases are back with an energetic collection of intelligent pop. This time around, the band’s obsession with complex rhythms is channelled though layers and layers of melody ... What’s missing is any emotional contrast to stop all that cleverness from sounding overwhelming."

Travis Persaud of Exclaim! similarly praised the album's production value while lamenting its lack of grounding pathos: "The songs are engaging and incredibly catchy, but lack emotion ― that intangible quality that will take this feel-good record and give it staying power. It's a step in an interesting direction though."
