= TR/ST =

Canadian electronic project

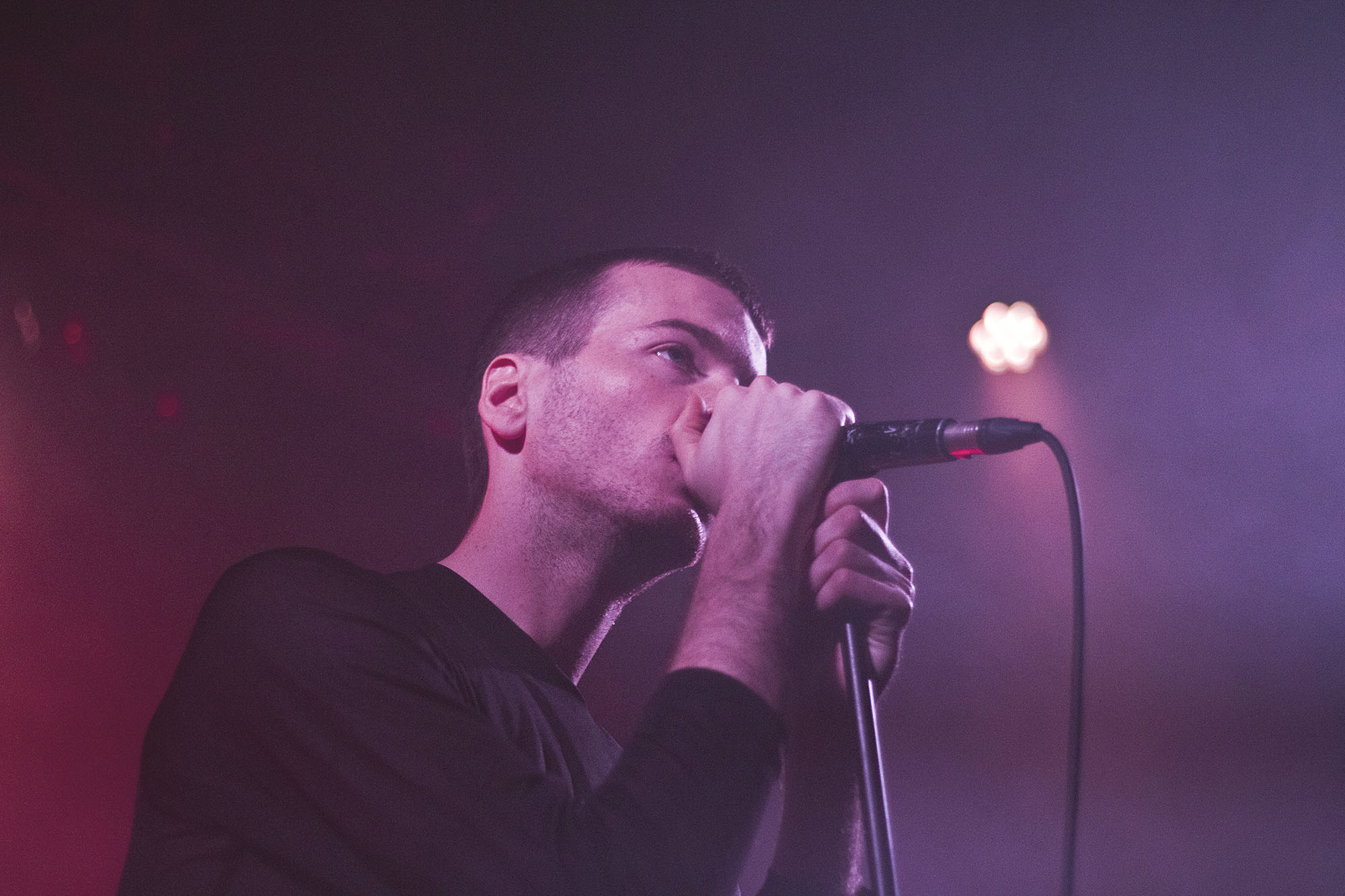
- Robert Alfons performing as TR/ST in Bologna in 2015

Background information
- Also known as: Trust (2010–2015)
- Origin: Toronto, Ontario, Canada
- Genres: Electronic; electropop; synth-pop; dark wave; cold wave; goth-pop
- Years active: 2010–present
- Labels: Sacred Bones; Arts & Crafts; Grouch; Royal Mountain; Dais
- Members: Robert Alfons
- Past members: Maya Postepski
- Website: trstonline.net

TR/ST (previously known as Trust) is the Canadian electronic music project of Robert Alfons. It was formed as a band in 2010 when Alfons met Maya Postepski of Austra, but Postepski left in 2012. The project has released five albums: TRST (2012), Joyland (2014), The Destroyer (Part 1), The Destroyer (Part 2) (2019), and Performance (2024). Alfons has also produced remixes for Feist, Moby, Zhala, and Jonna Lee.

== History ==
=== 2010–2013: Formation and TRST ===
Alfons and Postepski met in late 2009, started writing songs together, and formed the band in January 2010. Alfons drew inspiration from minimal, repetitive electronic music like early OMD, as well as from the indie rock band Pony Da Look. TRST started out with Sacred Bones Records, releasing their debut single "Candy Walls" and "Bulbform" in 2011, on the strength of the former, they were signed to record label Arts & Crafts in the same year.

They released their debut album TRST on 28 February 2012 on the Arts & Crafts label. Critic Luis-Enrique Arrazola of the National Post said of their Toronto release party that "Trust gave an outstanding performance proving that they're an act worthy of all the hype. With a set far past midnight, they're the perfect ending to a wild night in the city, taking you on a relentless trip through a set list dripping with sexual tension before winding down to the last pulses of the synthesizer."

Larry Fitzmaurice of Pitchfork rated the album 7.4 out of 10 saying "... I quite like Alfons' voice; it has a slithering, grimy quality to it that increases the raunch-factor on particularly dirty-sounding tracks like "Shoom" and "Bulbform", and when he struts his stuff on "Sulk" and "Dressed for Space", he sounds like the kind of personality-heavy singer indie culture's been hesitant to embrace over the last few years." It was listed at number eight on Insound's Top Albums of 2012 and at number thirty-seven on Under the Radar's Top 50 Albums of 2012.

Soon after the release of the album Postepski left the band to focus on Austra's growing commitments and her own solo project Princess Century.

=== 2014–2015: Joyland ===
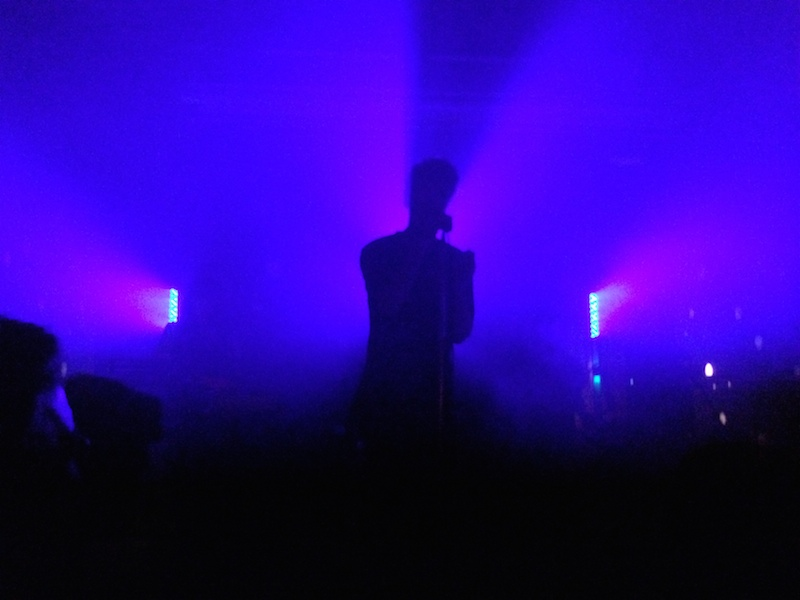
TR/ST performing at The Pinhook in Durham on 15 April 2014

Joyland was released on 3 March 2014 by Arts & Crafts. The album received generally favorable reviews. MusicOMH gave it a score 4 out of 5, describing the album as doing an "excellent job of sharpening and streamlining Trust’s sound into something even better than that displayed on the debut." The album debuted at No. 12 on the Billboard Dance/Electronic Albums chart.

It was promoted by three singles: "Rescue, Mister" accompanied by a music video directed by Sabrina Ratté, "Capitol" with a music video directed by Will Joines, and "Are We Arc?" accompanied by a music video directed by Malcolm Pate.

On 13 March 2015, Alfons released the single "Slug" exclusively to YouTube.

=== 2016–2019: The Destroyer ===
In 2016, Alfons said that the upcoming third studio album was "being finished late last month". The album was set to be released in 2017 but the release date was delayed. The album was recorded in a 150-year-old farmhouse near the north of Toronto and in Los Angeles.

On 14 July 2017, Alfons released "Bicep", the first single promoting the upcoming album. On 6 December 2017, the artist premiered music video for "Destroyer". The clip was directed by Justin Tyler Close and Ryan Heffington In the following year, TR/ST collaborated with singer ionnalee on the song "Harvest" for the album Everyone Afraid to Be Forgotten.

On 5 February 2019, TR/ST released a video for the single "Gone" and announced an upcoming two-part album The Destroyer, with a release date of 19 April 2019 for the first collection of songs, followed by three singles, "Unbleached", released in February, "Grouch", released in March, and "Colossal", released in April. The record marked the return of former member Maya Postepski as a collaborator.

On 25 July 2019, Alfons released the second single, "Iris", off his fourth studio album The Destroyer (Part 2). The track was produced by Alfons, mixed and additionally produced by Damian Taylor and live drums were played by Lia Braswell. On the same day, the artist announced the release of the album, release date and artwork credits via Instagram with the digital pre-order being available on iTunes. The track was followed by other three singles: "Destroyer", officially released on 29 August 2019 and premiered on Flood Magazine, "The Stain", released on 19 September 2019 and premiered on Magnetic, and "Cor", released on 10 October 2019 and teased on YouTube before the premiere. In contrast to the industrial sound and immediacy of The Destroyer, follow up-release The Destroyer (Part 2) is primarily a dream pop and ambient album with arrangements that differ from earlier TR/ST releases.

=== 2023–present: TR/ST EP and Performance ===
In 2023, Alfons signed to Dais Records and released the single "Robrash", which served as the lead single from the self-titled TR/ST EP. The EP was released on 26 January 2024 with no prior announcement, featuring collaborations with Cecile Believe and Jake Shears, an official release of the 2015 single "Slug", and a cover of the Pet Shop Boys' song "Being Boring". This was followed by the singles "Soon" in May 2024 and "All at Once" in July 2024, as well as the announcement of Alfons' fifth studio album Performance, released on 13 September 2024. A music video for the title track on the album "Performance" was directed by Bryan M. Ferguson and released 10 September 2024 prior to the album's release.

== Members ==
=== Current members ===
- Robert Alfons – music production, vocals (2010–present)

=== Former members ===
- Maya Postepski – music production, live drums (2010–2012), session music production (2017–2019), live keyboards (2019)

=== Current session/touring members ===
- Lia Braswell – drums (2019–present)
- Robin Hatch – keyboards (2024–present)

=== Former session/touring members ===
- Carolyn Gordon – keyboards (2011–2012)
- Cameron Findlay (aka Kontravoid) – drums (2012)
- unknown name – keyboards (2012)
- Anne Gauthier – drums (2013–2018)
- Maya Postepski – session music production (2017–2019), live keyboards (2019)
- Esther Munits (aka Esther Blue) – keyboards (2013–2023)

== Discography ==
=== Studio albums ===
Title	Details
TRST	Released: 28 February 2012; Label: Arts & Crafts; Formats: CD, LP, digital download
Joyland	Released: 4 March 2014; Label: Arts & Crafts; Formats: CD, LP, digital download
The Destroyer (Part 1)	Released: 19 April 2019; Label: Grouch, Royal Mountain; Formats: CD, LP, cassette, digital download
The Destroyer (Part 2)	Released: 1 November 2019; Label: Grouch, Royal Mountain; Formats: CD, LP, cassette, digital download
Performance	Released: 13 September 2024; Label: Dais; Formats: CD, LP, digital download

=== EPs ===
Title	Details
TR/ST	Released: 26 January 2024; Label: Dais; Formats: Digital download

=== Singles ===
Title	Year	Album
"Candy Walls"	2011	TRST
"Bulbform"	2011	TRST
"Sulk"	2012	TRST
"Dressed for Space"	2012	TRST
"Heaven"	2013	TRST
"Rescue, Mister"	2014	Joyland
"Capitol"	2014	Joyland
"Are We Arc?"	2014	Joyland
"Slug"	2015	TR/ST EP
"Bicep"	2017	The Destroyer – Part 1
"Gone"	2019	The Destroyer – Part 1
"Unbleached"	2019	The Destroyer – Part 1
"Grouch"	2019	The Destroyer – Part 1
"Colossal"	2019	The Destroyer – Part 1
"Control Me"	2019	The Destroyer – Part 1
"Iris"	2019	The Destroyer – Part 2
"Destroyer"	2019	The Destroyer – Part 2
"The Stain"	2019	The Destroyer – Part 2
"Cor"	2019	The Destroyer – Part 2
"The Shore"	2022	Performance
"Razr"	2022	Impact Winter (Original Soundtrack)
"Robrash"	2023	TR/ST EP
"Soon"	2024	Performance
"All at Once"	2024	Performance
"Dark Day"	2024	Performance
"Performance"	2024	Performance

=== Guest appearances ===
Title	Year	Other artist(s)	Album
"Not a Waste of Sky"	2011	—N/a	Todo Muere Volume 1
"Harvest"	2018	ionnalee	Everyone Afraid to Be Forgotten
"Dissolved"	2020	Jesse Draxler	Reigning Cement

=== Remixes ===
Title	Year	Artist
"Graveyard" (Trust remix)	2012	Feist
"The Perfect Life" (Trust remix)	2013	Moby
"Aerobic Lambada" (TR/ST remix)	2015	Zhala
"Not Human" (TR/ST remix)	2017	ionnalee
"Hear You Now" (TR/ST remix)	2020	Taali
