= Future Politics =

Studio album by Austra
- Released: January 20, 2017
- Genre: Synth-pop; new wave; house
- Length: 45:15
- Label: Domino
- Producer: Katie Stelmanis

Austra chronology
Olympia (2013)	Future Politics (2017)	Hirudin (2020)

Singles from Future Politics
- 1. "Utopia" Released: October 20, 2016; 2. "Future Politics" Released: December 6, 2016; 3. "I Love You More than You Love Yourself" Released: February 7, 2017

Professional ratings
Aggregate scores
Source	Rating
AnyDecentMusic?	7.0/10
Metacritic	74/100
Review scores
Source	Rating
AllMusic	4/5 stars
The A.V. Club	B
DIY	4/5 stars
Exclaim!	8/10
The Guardian	3/5 stars
NME	4/5 stars
Pitchfork	7.4/10
PopMatters	7/10 stars
Q	4/5 stars
Uncut	6/10

Future Politics is the third studio album by Canadian electronic music band Austra, released on January 20, 2017, by Domino worldwide and by Pink Fizz Records in Canada. The album was inspired by frontwoman Katie Stelmanis' time living in Montreal and Mexico City, while also drawing inspiration from Massive Attack, Latin-American record producers (including Chancha Vía Circuito), E. E. Cummings, accelerationism, and Judith Butler. The cover art was photographed at Mexican architect Luis Barragán's Cuadra San Cristóbal in Mexico City.

== Track listing ==
All tracks are written by Katie Stelmanis.

No.	Title	Length
1.	"We Were Alive"	4:35
2.	"Future Politics"	4:09
3.	"Utopia"	4:03
4.	"I'm a Monster"	4:38
5.	"I Love You More than You Love Yourself"	4:58
6.	"Angel in Your Eye"	3:14
7.	"Freepower"	5:09
8.	"Gaia"	3:08
9.	"Beyond a Mortal"	5:45
10.	"Deep Thought"	1:09
11.	"43"	4:28

== Personnel ==
Credits adapted from the liner notes of Future Politics.

=== Austra ===
- Katie Stelmanis – vocals, production, engineering
- Maya Postepski – additional production (tracks 3–5, 7, 9)
- Dorian Wolf – synth (tracks 1–5, 7); bass (tracks 9, 11)

=== Additional personnel ===
- Jennifer Mecija – violin (track 1)
- Alice Wilder – guitar (track 3); mixing, additional production (all tracks)
- Heba Kadry – mastering
- Renata Raksha – artwork, photography
- Nick Steinhardt – layout, graphic design

== Charts ==
Chart performance for Future Politics
Chart (2017)	Peak position
Austrian Albums (Ö3 Austria)	36
Belgian Albums (Ultratop Flanders)	98
Belgian Albums (Ultratop Wallonia)	180
German Albums (Offizielle Top 100)	61
Swiss Albums (Schweizer Hitparade)	46
UK Dance Albums (OCC)	12
UK Independent Albums (OCC)	29
US Heatseekers Albums (Billboard)	7
US Independent Albums (Billboard)	27
US Top Dance Albums (Billboard)	19
