= Emma McKenna =

Canadian writer and musician (born 1983)

- Born: Emma Jane McKenna; 1983 (age 41–42)
- Origin: Duncan, British Columbia Canada
- Occupation(s): Writer, academic

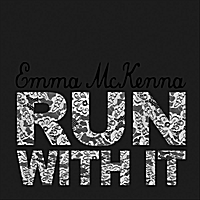
Album cover of Emma McKenna's record, Run With It

Emma Jane McKenna (born August 18, 1983) is a multi-disciplinary writer. She earned a PhD in English and Cultural Studies at McMaster University. McKenna's first book of poetry, Chenille or Silk, was published on March 8, 2019, with Caitlin Press. Her first full-length album as a singer-songwriter, Run With It, was released on June 8, 2010. She was also a founding member of riot grrrl band Galaxy, with Katie Stelmanis and Maya Postepski.

== Discography ==
=== Galaxy ===
- I Want You to Notice, 2006

=== Solo ===
- Run with It (2010)
- The Might (2013)
- B-Sides: What It Becomes (2017)

=== Compilations ===
- Friends in Bellwoods II (Happiness), 2009
- Building Blocks (Happiness, Shadows), 2010
