= Perch Patchwork =

Studio album by Maps & Atlases
- Released: June 29, 2010
- Genre: Indie rock
- Label: Barsuk Records
- Producer: Jason Cupp

Maps & Atlases chronology
You and Me and the Mountain (2008)	Perch Patchwork (2010)	Living Decorations EP (2011)

Perch Patchwork is the first official LP by experimental rock band Maps & Atlases. It was released by Barsuk Records on June 29, 2010.

Professional ratings
Review scores
Source	Rating
AllMusic	3.5/5 stars
The A.V. Club	B−
Pitchfork	7.4/10
Uncut	4/5 stars

== Track listing ==
No.	Title	Length
1.	"Will"	2:16
2.	"The Charm"	3:13
3.	"Living Decorations"	2:54
4.	"Solid Ground"	2:47
5.	"Is"	1:43
6.	"Israeli Caves"	3:53
7.	"Banished Be Cavalier"	2:53
8.	"Carrying the Wet Wood"	3:11
9.	"Pigeon"	2:53
10.	"If This Is"	2:42
11.	"Was"	2:15
12.	"Perch Patchwork"	5:45

== Personnel ==
Maps & Atlases

- Erin Elders
- Shiraz Dada
- Chris Hainey
- Dave Davison

Additional Personnel

- Dan Schwartz - Vocals
- Rashaad Jones - Cello
- Ed Kardasz - Paintings
- Justin Past - Brass, Woodwind
- Josh Roth - Management
- Ryan Duggan - Design
- Emily Lazar - Mastering
- Jason Cupp - Producer, Engineer, Mixing
- Joe LaPorta - Mastering
- Keith Goodwin - Vocals
- Kristina Dutton - Violin
- Tim Arnold - Vocals
