= Sour Widows =

American indie rock band

Sour Widows is an American indie rock band from Oakland, California.

In 2020, the group released their self-titled debut EP. The group followed up on this release with their second EP titled Crossing Over. In April 2024, the band announced their debut album, Revival of a Friend. The album was released on June 28, 2024. and was named a "Best New Album" by Paste.
