= The Unsustainable Lifestyle =

Studio album by Beauty Pill
- Released: March 15, 2004
- Recorded: April 2002 – July 2003
- Genre: Indie rock
- Label: Dischord Records

Beauty Pill chronology
You Are Right To Be Afraid (2003)	The Unsustainable Lifestyle (2004)	Beauty Pill Describes Things As They Are (2015)

Professional ratings
Review scores
Source	Rating
AllMusic	3.5/5 stars
Pitchfork	5.7/10

The Unsustainable Lifestyle is the first full-length CD by indie rock band Beauty Pill. It was released in 2004 on Dischord Records.

== Track listing ==
1. "Goodnight for Real" – 4:48
2. "Lifeguard in Wintertime" – 4:32
3. "The Mule on the Plane" – 4:38
4. "Prison Song" – 3:10
5. "The Western Prayer" – 3:40
6. "Won't You Be Mine" – 3:26
7. "Such Large Portions!" – 4:53
8. "Nancy Medley, Girl Genius, Age 15" – 5:01
9. "Quote Devout Unquote" – 5:00
10. "Drive Down the Cost" – 4:15
11. "I'm Just Gonna Close My Eyes for a Second" – 3:33
12. "Terrible Things" – 2:48
