= Maps & Atlases =

American rock band

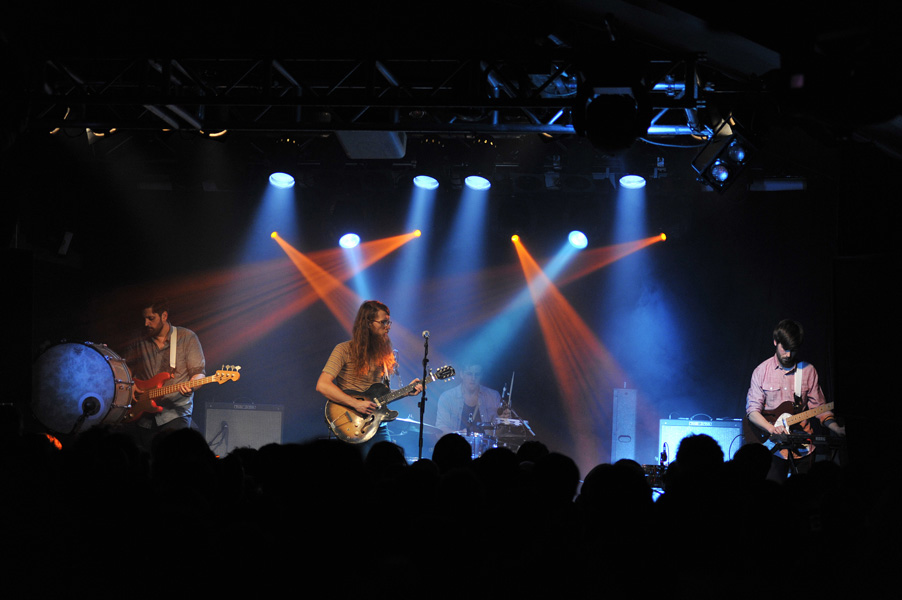
- Maps & Atlases performing in 2012. Left to right: bassist Shiraz Dada, guitarist/vocalist Dave Davison, drummer Chris Hainey and former guitarist Erin Elders.

Background information
- Origin: Chicago, Illinois, United States
- Genres: Alternative rock, math rock, indie rock
- Years active: 2004–present
- Labels: Sargent House (2006 - 2009); FatCat Records (current, UK/Europe); Barsuk Records (current, US)
- Members: Shiraz Dada; Dave Davison; Chris Hainey; Erin Elders

Maps & Atlases is an American indie rock group from Chicago, Illinois, United States, influenced by alternative rock, folk and experimental music. They have been labeled as a math rock band.

The band has released three official EPs and three full-length LPs and toured on the festival circuit in the United States, including SXSW and CMJ, as well as national tours with RX Bandits, These Arms Are Snakes, mewithoutYou, Foals, So Many Dynamos, Ra Ra Riot, Minus the Bear, Princeton, The Fall of Troy, Nurses, Pattern Is Movement, Good Old War, Portugal. The Man, Tera Melos, and more.

After a recording hiatus following their 2012 release, Beware and Be Grateful, the group announced a new record, Lightlessness Is Nothing New, and an accompanying North American tour.

== History ==
=== 2004–2006: Early years, Bird Barnyard, and Tree, Swallows, Houses ===
Maps & Atlases formed in fall 2004 when the founding members met in art school at Columbia College Chicago. Bassist Shiraz Dada, drummer Chris Hainey, Dave Davison (guitar and vocals), and guitarist Erin Elders first came together trying to find a sound that was both technical and organic, in the same vein as their influences Don Caballero and Hella. According to bassist Shiraz Dada, the group's name originates from a hand-painted advertisement posted on the side of a building near the college. Regarding their musicianship, Elders said that Maps & Atlases' goal as a band was "to put existing technical elements in a new context, and create something artistically unique, but still accessible."

Maps & Atlases came to prominence in the Chicago underground music scene of the early 2000s, among a diverse group of sounds that included post-hardcore, math rock, indie, punk, and emo music. Speaking with The A.V. Club, Davison said,

"When we first started, early on in our academic careers at Columbia, we were finding out about so much stuff at once. Other than bands like Smoking Popes and other groups I would hear about on, like, Q101, I didn't really know much about underground bands in Chicago.

I soon found about the whole Drag City/Thrill Jockey/Touch And Go scene, but it seemed so unattainable and unrelated to the kind of shows that we were playing. Even though we enjoyed the music, it seemed like a different thing. We were all 20, 21 [years old]; all the shows we played were with hardcore bands at American Legions."

Three of the group's early songs appear on an informally-titled EP, Bird Barnyard, which never saw an official physical release, while another appears on a split EP with fellow Chicago band The Antenora. Both recordings are unavailable at conventional retail, though Bird Barnyard has been made available by fans through YouTube.

The band self-released their EP Tree, Swallows, Houses, recorded by Dada, in 2006. Allmusic writer Jason Lymangrover called it "a busy record full of mathematical mastery," praising the "technical wizardry" of its composition and describing it as an "adventurous combination of art rock, indie rock, and prog rock." The band toured Trees, Swallows, Houses for nearly two years, gaining a local following with shows around the Midwest, playing alongside acts including Russian Circles, Matt & Kim, Karma with a K, and Rahim.

=== 2006–2009: Sargent House and You and Me and the Mountain ===
In late 2006 the band signed on with Sargent House, which re-released Trees, Swallows, Houses in 2007. This release led to Sargent House officially releasing many more records from other unsigned bands that it managed, later becoming the de facto record label for many of them.

In July 2008 Sargent House released the EP You and Me and the Mountain, again recorded with Dada. NPR described the EP as "a supercharged mix of odd meters, intertwining guitar runs and hurried, half-spoken vocals that pass so quickly, it's nearly impossible to follow with just one listen." The song "Daily News" was featured in a commercial for the 2010 Nintendo DS game Picross 3D.

=== 2009–2012: Barsuk Records, Perch Patchwork, and Beware and Be Grateful ===
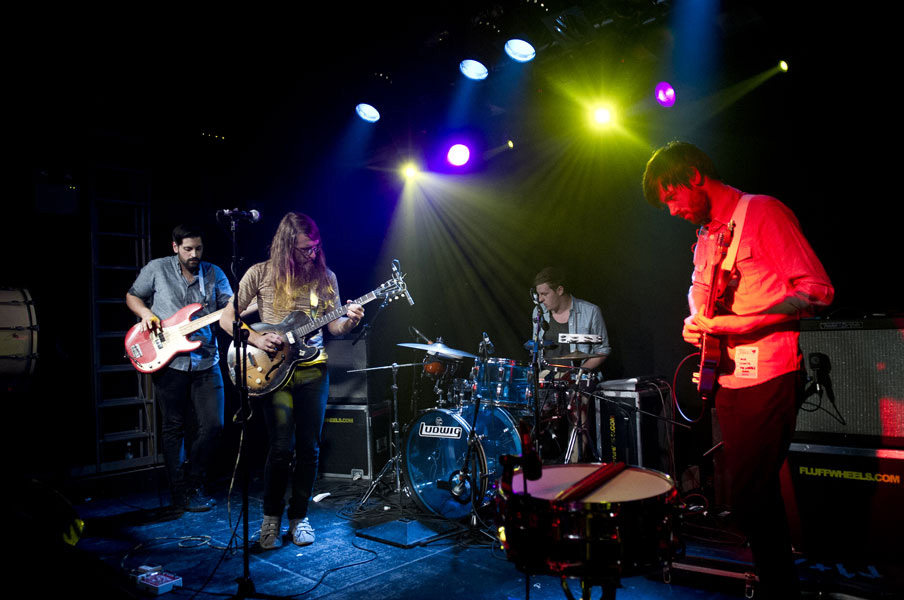
Maps & Atlases performing in 2012

The band spent the majority of 2009 writing and recording songs for their first full-length album with producer Jason Cupp (Finch, American Football, Anthony Green, Nurses, Good Old War, and more) at various studio locations. In March 2010 the band signed with Barsuk Records, who released their debut album, entitled Perch Patchwork, on June 29, 2010. The album was released to critical acclaim, and achieved an ADM Rating of 7.8 on UK-based review aggregator website AnyDecentMusic? and currently holds a rating of 72% on Metacritic, indicating "generally favorable" reviews.

Following the release of Perch Patchwork, the group released Living Decorations, an EP containing remixes and live recordings, on March 1, 2011. While scant on original material, the EP was positively received, with Heather Steele of The 405 commenting, "Living Decorations does not fit the math rock mould of Maps & Atlases past. However, once this is considered you will find a slightly different, yet undeniably distinctive sound that the band delivers."

On April 17, 2012, the band released their second full-length album, Beware and Be Grateful, again through Barsuk Records. The album was met with critical acclaim, currently holding a rating of "generally favorable" reviews on review aggregate Metacritic. The band would go on to tour in support of the record before entering an extended hiatus during which Maps & Atlases officially released no original recorded material.

=== 2012–2018: Departure of Erin Elders and touring as a trio ===
On April 13, 2015, Elders announced his departure from Maps & Atlases via his Facebook page. A former film student who directed several Maps & Atlases music videos during his tenure with the band, Elders went on to pursue a career in filmmaking, and has directed videos for emo band American Football, Iron & Wine, and more, as well as several short films.

In an October 2015 interview with Nashville college radio station WRVU, Davison commented on playing Maps & Atlases shows as a trio:

"It's interesting. One way I think it changes things overall is just that it creates a different dynamic in the way we play together. While obviously it was really fun to play with Erin, it's been fun to explore that new dynamic. And I think that it's led to us growing in the way we play together... I think that when you have two guitars trying to lock in it creates the need for a certain type of tightness... But now, live, everyone has more space."

=== 2018: Lightlessness Is Nothing New ===
On April 5, 2018, Maps & Atlases announced a new record, Lightlessness Is Nothing New, scheduled for release on June 1 through Barsuk Records—the group's first record in six years following 2012's Beware and Be Grateful. Alongside the announcement, the band released a single from the record, "Fall Apart," and plans for a North American promotional tour.

Regarding the writing process, Davison said that Lightlessness took form as a Maps & Atlases record when he enlisted Hainey and Dada to play on one of Davison's solo releases: "[T]hat was when I realized that maybe this doesn't need be a solo release. I like playing with Chris and Shiraz, and I'm asking them to play stuff on it, so I don't know why it would be a solo record."

Davison also stated that Lightlessness is thematically inspired by his conflicting emotions in the wake of his father's death:

"It's not some binary thing. This is not the darkness of my experience; Lightlessness is somewhere in between. It's somewhere that's not light or dark, not transparent or opaque."

Davison also addressed the band's nearly six-year apparent hiatus from record-making, during which the group (minus Elders) played occasional shows but released no new recorded music as Maps & Atlases. The downtime eventually culminated in a series of shows in early 2018 (including a short Japan tour), various teases through the band's social media channels and more. Regarding the group's reason for reconvening, Davison said,

"There had to be a purpose to it beyond momentum. Even from the very beginning, we always said we only wanted to record and play music because we feel like we want to express something and do something unique." ... "That break makes you realise how much all your best stories and memories have taken place with these people."

=== Side projects ===
In addition to the band, the members of Maps & Atlases have had various side projects – some official and others informal, occasional, or uncredited, throughout the indie music scene. Dave Davison created a solo outlet known as Cast Spells and released a split EP with Good Old War in 2009, followed by his Bright Works And Baton EP in 2010, both through Sargent House. Davison is also credited as a guitarist on the self-titled record by rock collective Hey!Tonal.

Davison has also appeared in works from other artists. He appeared on Sargent House label mate Good Old War's 2008 release, Only Way to Be Alone, playing guitar on the track "Weak Man". He also provided guest vocals on "ART SCHOOL CRUSH," a track from the 2013 record "Bootie Noir" by fellow Chicago artist NNAMDÏ.

Davison and Chris Hainey created an art-rock project known as Mountain Lion Mountain. The history of the group is ambiguous at best; in a 2011 interview, Davison and Hainey seemed to make light of its existence, insisting that it was a novelty jam group created for house shows:

"We were jamming on stuff here and there but it was mostly just in preparation for one show," Chris starts before they all collapse into giggles. Dave adds: "Shiraz and I used to live in a place that had shows in the basement and every year they'd have themed show where it was duos, two piece bands and some combination of us would just make up the band. It was online somewhere."

Since 2012, Elders has played guitar and provided vocals for Wedding Dress.

== Discography ==
Date of release	Title	Label	US Billboard peak	US sales
2005	Bird Barnyard EP	Unofficially released	-	-
2005	Split EP with The Antenora	Self-released	-	-
2006; January 10, 2007 (re-release)	Tree, Swallows, Houses EP	Self-released, Re-released by Sargent House	-	-
July 16, 2008	You and Me and the Mountain EP	Sargent House	-	-
June 29, 2010	Perch Patchwork	Barsuk Records	-	-
March 1, 2011	Living Decorations EP	Barsuk Records	-	-
April 17, 2012	Beware and Be Grateful	Barsuk Records	-	-
June 1, 2018	Lightlessness Is Nothing New	Barsuk Records	-	-

== Other appearances ==
Date of release	Title	Label	US Billboard peak	US sales
2013	You Be My Heart	Devon Reed – Released December 9, 2013	–	–
