= Beauty Pill =

American rock band

- Origin: Washington, D.C., U.S.
- Genres: Post-rock; electronic
- Years active: 2001–present
- Labels: Northern Spy, Ernest Jenning, Taffety Punk, Findings
- Members: Basla Andolsun; Chad Clark; Drew Doucette; Abram Goodrich; Erin Nelson; Devin Ocampo
- Past members: Jean Cook; Ryan Nelson; Rachel Burke; Joanne Gholl; Chad Molter; Holly Montoya
- Website: http://www.beautypill.com

Beauty Pill is an American post-rock band from Washington, D.C., based largely around the songs and ideas of singer/guitarist/producer Chad Clark.

Beauty Pill's music is generally characterized by cinematic arrangements and electronic textures.

This sensibility reflects Clark's parallel profession as a producer and engineer. His discography includes work with The Dismemberment Plan, Sparklehorse, Fugazi, Blakroc, Bernie Worrell, Marc Ribot, Mary Timony, The Evens, Lungfish, Bob Mould, The Wilderness, The Caribbean, Craig Wedren, among others.

== Career ==
=== Trio period (2001–2002) ===
Following the dissolution of their previous band Smart Went Crazy, Chad Clark and Abram Goodrich formed a new project.

They invited Joanne Gholl and the trio made an EP called The Cigarette Girl from the Future. studio experimentation and simple tunes. It received critical praise from The Washington Post, Chicago Tribune, and Pitchfork (which rated the record a 9.0).

However, the attempt to transform into a touring band proved difficult and this incarnation of Beauty Pill dissolved before ever playing a show.

=== Quintet period (2003–2005) ===
Rachel Burke, a recent Seattle-DC transplant and fan of the Cigarette Girl EP joined the band. They went on to recruit bassist Basla Andolsun and guitarist Drew Doucette, along with drummer Ryan Nelson, all of whom had been in bands Clark had recorded. The quintet released a lo-fi EP called You Are Right To Be Afraid followed shortly by a full-length album called The Unsustainable Lifestyle.

Rachel Burke announced that she was moving back to Seattle in order to be closer to her family, drawing the quintet period to a close.

=== "Ann the Word"/Sextet period (2006–2007) ===
Jean Cook replaced Rachel Burke as singer. Ryan Nelson left to form the band Soccer Team and was replaced by Devin Ocampo (also a veteran of Smart Went Crazy).

With Cook singing, Beauty Pill published the demo for a new song called “Ann The Word” via the band's Myspace page. At nearly 7 minutes, the song differed from the more "rock" sound of the quintet period. With electronic sounds and quasi-Japanese sonorities, “Ann The Word” was the most complex/technological thing Beauty Pill had ever released.

The song went on to stream 100,000+ times on MySpace. In interviews, Clark said “‘Ann The Word’ changed my life.”

=== Chad Clark illness ===
In the fall of 2007, Clark became gravely ill, stricken with viral cardiomyopathy, a rare condition resulting from a virus invading and inflaming the heart. The origin of the virus was unknown. Clark did not reveal his illness until February, 2008, when he underwent emergency open heart surgery to save his life. The surgery was successful and Clark spent the next two years recovering and making music privately.

=== Return to public work (2009–2010) ===
In the fall of 2009, Clark founded a Washington, DC, performance series called Story/Stereo. Taking place at the Writer's Center, the series blended literature and music with Clark as curator and host. The series received an endowment from the NEA.

In January, 2010, the band wrote and recorded the score for a play called suicide.chat.room. The work was a collaboration with choreographer Paulina Guerrero and director Marcus Kyd. The music for suicide.chat.room found favor with critics, with The A.V. Club calling it "brilliant and vividly balletic", The Washington Post calling it "smartly evocative" and the City Paper calling it "lyrical and convulsive, channeling [the spirit of the play] perfectly."

=== The Immersive Ideal project ===
In 2012, Beauty Pill was commissioned by Artisphere, a DC art museum, to record its new album in view of the public. In so doing, the band turned their recording process into a public art exhibit. The resulting recording would later be released as an album.

=== 2015 releases ===
In 2015, Beauty Pill released the double LP Beauty Pill Describes Things as They Are, the result of the Immersive Ideal recording sessions, as well as a vinyl reissue of The Cigarette Girl from the Future. Describes Things As They Are was included in many best-of-year lists. including NPR, Rolling Stone, SPIN, Magnet and VICE. It was cited by TIME Magazine as one of the ten best albums of the decade. In a performance for NPR's Tiny Desk, the band performed songs from the new record, using a Monome as a sample sequencer.

=== 2016-2019 ===
In 2016 and 2017, the band went on tour with Arto Lindsay, playing mostly museums and art spaces.

Jean Cook was replaced by Erin Nelson in fall 2018.

2019-2023

In February 2020, the band released the 2010 score to suicide.chat.room. The soundtrack album is titled Sorry You're Here.

In spring 2020, the band released Please Advise, the first release with new singer Erin Nelson.

In December 2021, the band released the 12" single Instant Night.

In Spring of 2022, Chad Clark was hospitalized for an emergency heart transplant.

In January 2023, the band released Blue Period, a double-album anthology of its Dischord catalogue.

In spring 2023, the band reissued Describes Things As They Are in its original double vinyl form for Record Store Day.

== Discography ==
=== Albums ===
- The Unsustainable Lifestyle (2004)
- Beauty Pill Describes Things as They Are (2015)
- Sorry You're Here (2020)
- Blue Period (anthology) (2023)

=== Extended plays ===
- The Cigarette Girl from the Future (2001)
- You Are Right to Be Afraid (2003)
- Please Advise (2020)
- Instant Night (2021)
