= Mimicking Birds =

Rock band

- Origin: Portland, Oregon, United States
- Genres: Indie rock, indie folk
- Years active: 2009-present
- Label: Glacial Pace Recordings
- Members: Nate Lacy; Aaron Hanson; Ian Luxton; Adam Trachsel; Matthan Minster
- Website: http://www.mimickingbirds.com/

Mimicking Birds is a rock group from Portland, Oregon centered on Nate Lacy (vocals, acoustic guitars), with Aaron Hanson (drums), Ian Luxton (electric guitars), Matthan Minster (Guitar/Keys) and Adam Trachsel (Bass/Keys).

== History ==
Mimicking Birds was originally a vehicle for Nate Lacy's home recordings, but expanded to a trio after he signed to Modest Mouse member Isaac Brock's Glacial Pace Recordings label in 2008. The group toured with Modest Mouse in 2009.

The eponymous debut album was largely recorded at Brock's home in Portland and released in 2010, to a positive critical reaction. Pitchfork Media gave the album a 7.4/10 rating, describing Lacy as "extremely gifted with cyclical melodies: thorny, fingerpicked spines around which he can snake a range of sounds simply for ambience". PopMatters gave the album 7/10, calling the album "fragile, melancholy and complexly surreal". The A.V. Club gave the album a B+ rating. The Seattle Weekly viewed that the album "strikes a balance between dynamic, sprightly melodies and hushed, languid folk lullabies". The Portland Mercury described it as "ethereal, pensive, and austere—a calm, chilly night spent gazing at a clear, starry sky".

In 2009 Mimicking Birds performed at the Austin City Limits Music Festival and made an appearance at Lollapalooza in 2010. The band has toured with artists such as Modest Mouse, Deertick, The Low Anthem, Blind Pilot, Cloud Cult, Jenny Lewis, Langhorne Slim, Jesse Sykes and Jakob Dylan and shared stages with artists including but not limited to Fleet Foxes, Menomena, Helio Sequence, Blitzen Trapper, The Tallest Man on Earth, Okkervil River, and Conor Oberst.

The band's second album entitled "Eons" was released on May 13, 2014, again on Glacial Pace Recordings.

Their third album entitled "Layers of Us" was released on January 26, 2018.

== Discography ==
- Early Recordings (2004)
1. "Rivers, Veins and Roots"
2. "A Perfunctory Clockwork Yawn"
3. "For the Birds"
4. "Murky Mess"
5. "Shellacked in Tar"
6. "Plastic Seeds"
7. "The Ravine"
8. "Nothing to Fear"
9. "The Chimney Sweep"
10. "The Loop (Demo Version)"
- Mimicking Birds (2010), Glacial Pace Recordings
1. "Home And Somewhere Else"
2. "The Loop"
3. "Burning Stars"
4. "New Doomsdays"
5. "Subsonic Words"
6. "Pixels"
7. "Remnants and Pictures"
8. "Them"
9. "Cabin Fever"
10. "10 Percent"
11. "Under and in Rocks"
- Eons (2014), Glacial Pace Recordings
1. "Memorabilia"
2. "Acting Your Age"
3. "Owl Hoots"
4. "Spent Winter"
5. "Bloodlines"
6. "Night Light"
7. "Water Under Burned Bridges"
8. "Wormholes"
9. "Seeing Eye Dog"
10. "Moving On"
- Layers of Us (2018), Glacial Pace Recordings
1. "Dust Layers"
2. "Another Time"
3. "Sunlight Daze"
4. "Island Shore"
5. "Great Wave"
6. "A Part"
7. "Belongings"
8. "Lumens"
9. "Time To Waste"
10. "One Eyed Jack"
