= Xylosynth =

The xylosynth, also known as a "xylophonic synthesizer", is an instrument created by Will Wernick in 1986, originally designed for the English pop band, the Drum Theatre.

== History ==
In the early 1990s, there was a demand by artists wanting to play on acoustic mallets, Gerry McCavana, who was originally a Metrology Engineer, quit his job to spend time with Will Wernick. Together, they began to develop and advance the software and electronics for the xylosynth. It is now used in many different styles of music and percussions, worldwide, such as jazz and contemporary.

== Instrument ==
The xylosynth is an electric percussion mallet instrument, similar to a xylophone. The keys are made out of either solid bubinga wood or birch wood resulting in a dynamic range from two to five octave sizes. The xylosynth has a latency speed of 0.003 seconds or less. The sound generated from the xylosynth is very clear and each note is easily heard. Even though it is not an acoustic instrument, the feel and sound of the instrument would lead one to believe that it could be. The xylosynth can be complemented by a variety of accessories such as a single or double foot pedals.
