= The Cigarette Girl from the Future =

EP by Beauty Pill
- Released: 2001
- Recorded: Inner Ear Studios 1999 - 2000
- Genre: Indie
- Length: 22:59
- Label: Dischord Records
- Producer: Chad Clark

Beauty Pill chronology
The Cigarette Girl from the Future (2001)	You Are Right to Be Afraid (2003)

The Cigarette Girl from the Future is the debut EP release by the indie band Beauty Pill.

== Track listing ==
1. "Rideshare" – 4:21
2. "The Cigarette Girl from the Future" – 3:43
3. "The Idiot Heart" – 4:52
4. "Bone White Crown Victoria" – 4:46
5. "Here Lies Rachel Wallace" – 5:15

== Personnel ==
- Chad Clark - Vocals, Guitar, Treatments
- Joanne Gholl - Vocals, Bass, Guitar
- Abram Goodrich - Drums, Bass, Guitar
  - Jerry Busher- Trumpet on "The Cigarette Girl From the Future"

=== Additional personnel ===
- Mixing - Chad Clark
- Mastering - Charlie Pilsner
- Illustration & Design - Kelley Bell

== Details ==
- Ryan Nelson joined a few months after this EP was recorded, hence his work is not featured on this release.
