= Katie Stelmanis =

Canadian musician (born 1985)

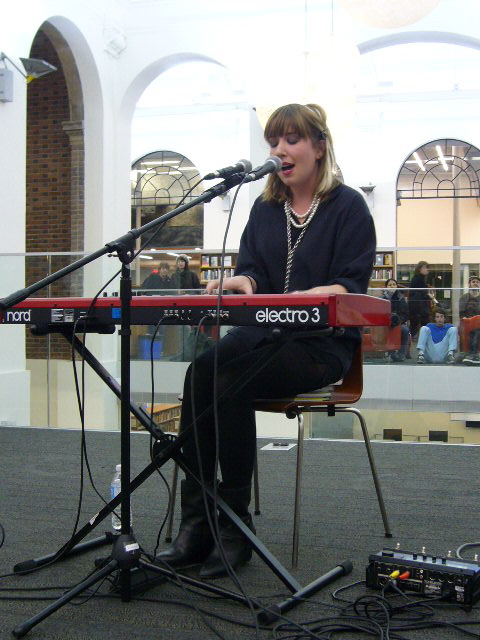
- Stelmanis performing in 2009

Background information
- Born: Kaitlin Austra Stelmanis; May 30, 1985 (age 41)
- Origin: Toronto, Ontario, Canada
- Genres: Indie rock; new wave
- Instruments: Vocals; piano
- Years active: 2004–present
- Labels: Blocks Recording Club; Paper Bag
- Member of: Austra
- Formerly of: Canadian Children's Opera Chorus; Galaxy; Bruce Peninsula
- Website: austramusic.com

Kaitlin "Katie" Austra Stelmanis (Latvian: Keitlīna "Keitija" Austra Štēlmanis, born 1985) is a Canadian musician who has performed and recorded both as a solo artist and with the bands Galaxy and Austra.

== Career ==
Stelmanis is classically trained and began performing in the Canadian Children's Opera Chorus at age ten. She was subsequently a member of the band Galaxy, along with Maya Postepski and Emma McKenna.

In 2008, she released her debut solo album, Join Us, through Blocks Recording Club, a Toronto-based artistic collective. Her first single was "Believe Me". The same year, she appeared on Fucked Up's album The Chemistry of Common Life. She has also contributed tracks to the compilation albums Friends in Bellwoods and Friends in Bellwoods II.

In 2009, Stelmanis cofounded the project Austra, together with Postepski, who departed the project after the release of their third studio album, Future Politics, leaving Stelmanis as the sole remaining member.

In 2011, Stelmanis co-wrote and sang on the Death in Vegas songs "Come Ride with Me", "Your Loft My Acid", and "Witchdance", from their fifth studio album, Trans-Love Energies. She has also performed as part of the Bruce Peninsula choir.

== Influences ==
Stelmanis has said that she was "obsessed with classical music" while growing up. She has cited artists such as Kate Bush, Nine Inch Nails, and Massive Attack as influences. Additionally, she takes inspiration from opera, Chicago house, and Detroit techno.

== Discography ==
with Galaxy

- I Want You to Notice (2006)

Solo

- Join Us (2008)

Austra

- Feel It Break (2011)
- Olympia (2013)
- Future Politics (2017)
- Hirudin (2019)
- Chin Up Buttercup (2025)

Compilation appearances

- Friends in Bellwoods – "You'll Fall" (2007)
- Friends in Bellwoods II – "Believe Me" (2009)

== Personal life ==
Stelmanis is of Italian, English, and Latvian descent. She identifies as a lesbian.
