= Feel It Break =

Studio album by Austra
- Released: May 13, 2011
- Studio: Giant, Toronto (Note: Tracks 1–3 and 6–11); 6 Nassau, Toronto (Note: Tracks 5 and 6); Canterbury, Toronto (Note: Piano on tracks 2, 3, 6, 8 and 11)
- Genre: Synth-pop; electropop; dark wave
- Length: 47:17
- Label: Domino
- Producer: Austra; Mike Haliechuk

Austra chronology
Sparkle (2011)	Feel It Break (2011)	Olympia (2013)

Singles from Feel It Break
- 1. "Beat and the Pulse" Released: November 16, 2010; 2. "Lose It" Released: May 9, 2011; 3. "Spellwork" Released: September 5, 2011

Feel It Break is the debut studio album by Canadian electronic music band Austra. It was released on May 13, 2011, by Domino. The album received generally positive reviews from music critics, who complimented its production and the vocals of lead singer Katie Stelmanis and compared the band to artists such as Kate Bush, Cocteau Twins, Fever Ray, Zola Jesus, and Depeche Mode. It was shortlisted for the 2011 Polaris Music Prize, and received a Juno Award nomination for Electronic Album of the Year. Feel It Break spawned three singles: "Beat and the Pulse", "Lose It", and "Spellwork".

A deluxe edition was released digitally on November 29, 2011, followed by a double CD edition on December 13, 2011, limited to 1,000 copies. Additional tracks include the "Beat and the Pulse" B-sides "Young and Gay" (written by Stelmanis as a tribute to the late Toronto artist and activist Will Munro) and "Energy"; the "Spellwork" B-side "Identity"; the unreleased B-sides "Believe Me", "Trip", and "Pianix"; cover versions of Joni Mitchell's "Woodstock" (a B-side to "Lose It") and Roy Orbison's "Crying"; and a remix of "Beat and the Pulse" by Shawn "Clown" Crahan of Slipknot.

== Singles ==
"Beat and the Pulse" was released as the album's lead single on November 16, 2010. An accompanying music video was released three months later. Directed by Claire Edmondson, the video shows singer Katie Stelmanis in a room surrounded by scantily clad women dancing in a suggestive manner.

The second single from the album, "Lose It", was released on May 9, 2011, a week before the album. A video for the single was released on May 4. The video shows the band posing around on a living room set dressed in different costumes. At one point, Stelmanis looks out a window and sees a missile frozen in mid-air. The video was directed by M Blash.

"Spellwork" was released as the third and final single on September 5, 2011. A music video was released on YouTube four months later. The music video, directed by Yelena Yemchuk, shows the band portraying mysterious figures wandering through a forest while a group of women engage in rituals reminiscent of the opening scenes of Arthur Miller's The Crucible.

== Critical reception ==
Professional ratings
Aggregate scores
Source	Rating
AnyDecentMusic?	7.6/10
Metacritic	75/100
Review scores
Source	Rating
AllMusic	4/5 stars
The A.V. Club	B
Clash	8/10
The Guardian	4/5 stars
NME	7/10
Now	4/5
Pitchfork	7.3/10
PopMatters	6/10
Slant Magazine	4/5 stars
Spin	7/10

Feel It Break received generally positive reviews from music critics. At Metacritic, which assigns a normalized rating out of 100 to reviews from mainstream publications, the album received an average score of 75, based on 24 reviews. Heather Phares of AllMusic wrote that Stelmanis "shar[es] the aloof beauty of Glasser, Esben and the Witch, Fever Ray, and Zola Jesus. Unlike some of the band's peers, however, there's a humanity to Stelmanis' vocals that, even when distorted, keeps Feel It Break's songs from feeling too remote", concluding that "Austra carve out a place of their own among their contemporaries." The Guardian's Michael Hann agreed, stating that although the band "have been lumped in with the synth-gothisms" of Zola Jesus and Fever Ray, "there's a cleanliness and sharpness about [Austra] that belies those associations." Similarly, Benjamin Boles of Now commented that the band's "dark electronic production and soaring vocals are often compared to acts like Fever Ray and Zola Jesus, but [...] Stelmanis brings a more musical sensibility to the formula, even if it's still miles away from mainstream pop", praising the album as an "extremely strong debut". Charlie Frame of Clash expressed, "The songwriting and production are strong throughout and often Stelmanis acquires a surprisingly rich amount of warmth from her dramatically sweeping sound that's rarely heard in this scene."

Pitchfork's Tom Breihan commented that Austra "play a warm, hazy sort of electro-goth" and added that "Austra's synth riffs don't pound or undulate; they flutter and envelop. And Stelmanis doesn't sing over the top of their tracks; she emits sound from somewhere in the thick of it." Andy Beta of Spin opined that the band's "seedy synth pop more often recalls Kate Bush's dramatic art songs and the Knife's ghostly techno-pop [...] But from surging, operatic opener 'Darken Her Horse' to closing piano ballad 'Lose It', Stelmanis' voice and vision are mostly her own." Slant Magazine's Paul Schrodt noted that the album "combines the atmospherics of darker new wave with a thumping, Giorgio Moroder-type beat. It's big in scope, but clean in sound. Every detail of the production feels carefully thought out." In a mixed review, Laura Snapes of NME commended the album's first half, but felt that the second half does not "quite [hit] such ecstatic peaks", adding that "although Katie's piano skills are impressive, final song 'The Beast' is too stripped back and literal, erring a teensy bit on Evanescence balladry." Arnold Pan of PopMatters called the album "promising" and characterized Stelmanis' "eccentric" voice as "[u]nique and resembling nothing except itself", but remarked that "Feel It Break as a whole is a little uneven because Austra still seems to be looking to strike the right balance between its different parts."

=== Accolades ===
Feel It Break was shortlisted for the 2011 Polaris Music Prize, but lost out to Arcade Fire's The Suburbs. It was also nominated for Electronic Album of the Year at the Juno Awards of 2012.

Publication	Accolade	Rank	Ref.
About.com	Top Alternative Music Albums of 2011	41	
Clash	The Best Debut Albums of 2011	8	
Drowned in Sound	Favourite Albums of 2011	24	
Exclaim!	Pop & Rock 2011: 30 Best Albums	7	
musicOMH	Top 50 Albums of 2011	42	
New York	The Top Ten Albums of the Year (2011)	1	
NME	50 Best Albums of 2011	45	
PopMatters	The 75 Best Albums of 2011	62	
Stereogum	Top 50 Albums of 2011	14	

== Track listing ==
All tracks are written by Austra, except where noted.

No.	Title	Length
1.	"Darken Her Horse"	5:21
2.	"Lose It"	4:29
3.	"The Future"	4:03
4.	"Beat and the Pulse"	4:56
5.	"Spellwork"	5:10
6.	"The Choke"	4:12
7.	"Hate Crime"	4:02
8.	"The Villain"	4:06
9.	"Shoot the Water"	3:23
10.	"The Noise"	3:32
11.	"The Beast"	4:03
Total length:		47:17

Deluxe edition bonus disc
No.	Title	Length
1.	"Identity"	5:03
2.	"Young and Gay"	3:29
3.	"Energy"	3:57
4.	"Believe Me"	3:27
5.	"Trip"	5:28
6.	"Pianix"	2:30
7.	"Woodstock" (writer: Joni Mitchell)	3:21
8.	"Crying" (writers: Roy Orbison, Joe Melson)	2:45
9.	"Beat and the Pulse" (Clown Remix)	7:09
Total length:		37:09

Australian Tour Edition bonus disc
No.	Title	Length
1.	"Spellwork" (MNDR Nighttime Remix)	5:15
2.	"Lose It" (Mark Pistel Dub Remix)	6:25
3.	"Lose It" (Planningtorock Remix)	5:24
4.	"Beat and the Pulse" (Still Going Remix)	6:06
5.	"Beat and the Pulse" (Steffi Bass-Break Dub Remix)	6:51
6.	"Beat and the Pulse" (Kool Thing Remix)	5:05
7.	"Lose It" (120 Days Remix)	4:07
8.	"Lose It" (Young Galaxy Remix)	4:15
9.	"Lose It" (Mark Pistel Vocal Remix)	6:23
10.	"Lose It" (Mark Pistel Funk Bass Remix)	6:25
Total length:		56:16

== Personnel ==
Credits adapted from the liner notes of Feel It Break.

=== Austra ===
- Katie Stelmanis
- Maya Postepski
- Dorian Wolf

=== Additional musicians ===
- Anna-Sophia Vukovitch – violin (track 10)
- Anissa Hart – cello (track 10)
- Ewan Kay – trombone (track 9)
- Carmen Elle – guitar (tracks 10, 11)

=== Technical ===
- Jeremy Darby – piano recording (tracks 2, 3, 6, 8, 11)
- Damian Taylor – additional recording (tracks 1, 2, 8, 10, 11); frequency harmonization, level balance, tone mixing (all tracks)
- Austra – production
- Mike Haliechuk – co-production (tracks 1, 4)
- Joe Lambert – mastering

=== Artwork ===
- Kate Young – photo art
- Rob Carmichael – design

== Charts ==
Chart (2011)	Peak position
US Heatseekers Albums (Billboard)	22

== Release history ==
Region	Date	Format	Edition	Label	Ref.
Australia	May 13, 2011	CD; digital download	Standard	EMI	
Germany	May 13, 2011	CD; LP; digital download	Standard	Domino	
United Kingdom	May 16, 2011	CD; LP; digital download	Standard	Domino	
United States	May 17, 2011	CD; LP; digital download	Standard	Domino	
Canada	May 17, 2011	CD; LP; digital download	Standard	Paper Bag	
Poland	May 30, 2011	CD	Standard	Sound Improvement	
Australia	October 28, 2011	2-CD	Tour Edition	EMI	
Germany	November 25, 2011	Digital download	Deluxe	Domino	
United Kingdom	November 28, 2011	Digital download	Deluxe	Domino	
United States	November 28, 2011	Digital download	Deluxe	Domino	
Canada	November 29, 2011	Digital download	Deluxe	Paper Bag	
Canada	December 13, 2011	2-CD	Deluxe	Paper Bag	
Australia	December 30, 2011	Digital download	Deluxe	EMI	
