= Maya Postepski =

Canadian musician and producer (born 1986)

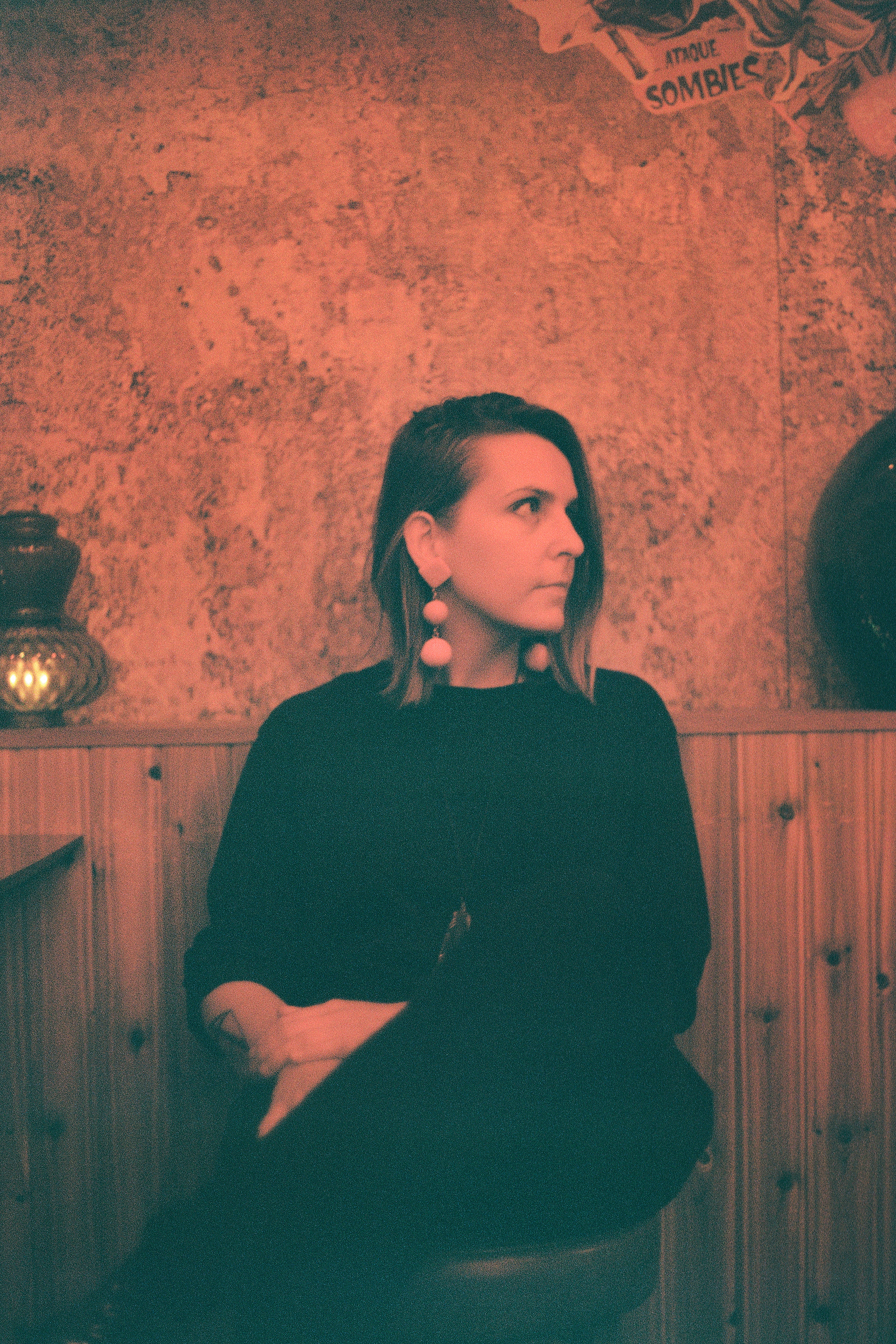

Background information
- Also known as: Princess Century
- Born: Maya Alina Postepski; March 6, 1986 (age 40)
- Origin: Toronto, Ontario, Canada
- Genres: Electronic
- Years active: 2000–present
- Labels: Paper Bag Records; Domino; Arts & Crafts
- Website: princesscentury.com

Maya Alina Postepski is a Canadian musician and producer from Toronto. She has been making music for over ten years, best known as drummer of the electronic group, Austra. She is a prolific remix artist, DJ and she co-wrote and produced the 2012 album TRST with Robert Alfons as TR/ST (Arts & Crafts). She also performs solo under the title Princess Century. She released her second full-length LP, Progress, on Paper Bag Records on October 16, 2015. In 2015 she moved to Belgium and produced the album Forever by Soldout. She stopped working with Austra in May 2017 to focus on her solo project Princess Century and continues to produce, DJ, make remixes and play drums for other bands including TR/ST.

== Discography ==
With Galaxy

- I Want You to Notice (2006)

With Katie Stelmanis

- Join Us (2008)

With Austra

- Feel It Break (2011)
- Olympia (2013)
- Future Politics (2017)

With TR/ST

- TRST (2012)
- The Destroyer (Part 1) (2019)
- The Destroyer (Part 2) (2019)

As Princess Century

- Lossless (2013)
- Lossy (EP) (2015)
- Progress (2015)
- Rendezvous (EP) (2016)
- s u r r e n d e r (2021)
