= Lightlessness Is Nothing New =

Studio album by Maps & Atlases
- Released: June 1, 2018
- Recorded: 2017–2018
- Genre: Indie pop
- Length: 38:00
- Label: Barsuk Records
- Producer: Scott Solter

Maps & Atlases chronology
Beware and Be Grateful (2012)	Lightlessness Is Nothing New (2018)

Singles from Lightlessness Is Nothing New
- 1. "Fall Apart" Released: April 4, 2018; 2. "4/25" Released: April 25, 2018; 3. "Ringing Bell" Released: May 10, 2018; 4. "Violet Threaded" Released: May 24, 2018

Lightlessness Is Nothing New is the third LP by rock band Maps & Atlases, released on June 1, 2018, through Barsuk Records. It is the first release by the band following a six-year hiatus from recording.

== Background ==
Lightlessness Is Nothing New was announced on April 4, 2018, following teases through Maps & Atlases' social media channels. Alongside the announcement, the group released the record's first single, "Fall Apart," and a 2018 North American tour schedule.

On April 25, 2018, the group released a second single from Lightlessness Is Nothing New, titled "4/25," as a video on their Instagram account. Shot during the band's short Japan tour in late 2017 and early 2018, the video features Davison framed among Japanese city streets, architecture and nature scenes. It was originally made available as an Instagram story, edited as one continuous shot and split into 14 ten-second segments.

=== Composition ===
Guitarist/vocalist Dave Davison said that Lightlessness Is Nothing New was born from collaborations between himself, bassist Shiraz Dada and drummer Chris Hainey for a planned solo release. Speaking with Noisey, Davison said,

“I thought Chris would do a good job on this, so I asked him to come play on it" ... "And that was when I realized that maybe this doesn’t need be a solo release. I like playing with Chris and Shiraz, and I’m asking them to play stuff on it, so I don’t know why it would be a solo record.”

Davison said the album's content is thematically inspired by his experiences following his father's death:

“This is not the darkness of my experience; Lightlessness is somewhere in between. It’s somewhere that’s not light or dark, not transparent or opaque" ... “The process of making this album has been a meditation on my experiences, and it’s given me a different perspective on them. Though I don’t know if I have any more answers than anybody else.”

== Track listing ==
No.	Title	Length
1.	"The Fear"	3:13
2.	"Fall Apart"	3:53
3.	"Ringing Bell"	3:50
4.	"Violet Threaded"	3:39
5.	"Fog and the Fall"	3:11
6.	"Learn How to Swim"	3:51
7.	"Super Bowl Sunday"	3:06
8.	"War Dreams"	3:56
9.	"4/25"	4:37
10.	"Wrong Kind of Magic"	4:47

== Reception ==
Noisey described the album's lead single, "Fall Apart," in the context of the Maps & Atlases oeuvre, saying that it "shows Maps & Atlases forging ahead as if they were a brand new band, allowing themselves to transpose Davison’s programmed drums into an out-and-out funk track. On 'Fall Apart,' Maps & Atlases more freely embrace modern pop production and songwriting devices, no longer shy about jumping into a chorus within the first 30 seconds of a song while still leaving their mark on it."

Writing for AllMusic, Neil Z. Yeung praised the album's "surprisingly pop-leaning" sound, stating that the album "can be split into two sonic halves": a "light and enjoyable" opening half, followed by a latter half which "veers closer to the band's earlier sound". He posited that the album's synthesis of these two moods allows Maps & Atlases to "get weird without sacrificing their newfound hook-friendly approach. Refreshed and reinvigorated, Maps & Atlases take risks that result in a major payoff on Lightlessness Is Nothing New, remaining faithful to their past while eyeing their future."

Amanda Wicks' 7/10 review for Pitchfork similarly praised the interplay of the album's composition and theme, calling Lightlessness "deceptively upbeat" despite its thematic origins and Maps & Atlases' "most accessible album to date, touching on Peter Gabriel’s fizzy pop proclivities and reaching for TV on the Radio’s early grandness." She continued by stating that "Maps & Atlases have always dreamed big when it comes to their sound, and they infuse their third album with heady, melodic production that spotlights the complex experience of absence. More than focusing on a lack, though, Lightlessness Is Nothing New captures how absence can become a radiating presence that infiltrates and upends every aspect of life."

== Personnel ==
- Shiraz Dada (bass)
- Chris Hainey (drums, percussion, artwork)
- Dave Davison (guitar, vocals)
- Jason Cupp (engineer, percussion, programming, additional production)
- Michael Hilger (guitar, keyboards)
- Tate Brazas (layout, vocals)
- Matt Pence (mastering)
- Scott Solter (engineering, mixing, production)
- Aaron Stovall (keyboards)
- James Kearns (artwork)
