= Trst (album) =

Studio album by TR/ST
- Released: February 28, 2012
- Genre: Synth-pop; dark wave; EBM
- Length: 51:58
- Label: Arts & Crafts
- Producer: Robert Alfons; Maya Postepski

TR/ST chronology
Trst (2012)	Joyland (2014)

Singles from Trst
- 1. "Candy Walls" Released: March 29, 2011; 2. "Bulbform" Released: September 19, 2011; 3. "Sulk" Released: January 16, 2012; 4. "Dressed for Space" Released: September 10, 2012; 5. "Heaven" Released: January 10, 2013

Trst (stylised in all caps) is the debut studio album by Canadian electronic music project TR/ST. Self-produced by the band, it was released on February 28, 2012, by Arts & Crafts Productions. The record features "gloomy synth-pop" and "fully-fleshed dark wave" sounds that have been described as "a combination of gothic rock and trance pop."

== Critical reception ==
Professional ratings
Aggregate scores
Source	Rating
Metacritic	71/100
Review scores
Source	Rating
Consequence of Sound	C+
Exclaim!	8/10
musicOMH	4/5 stars
NME	7/10
Now	4/5 stars
Pitchfork	7.4/10
PopMatters	6/10
Tiny Mix Tapes	4/5 marks
Under the Radar	8/10

Upon its release, Trst received generally positive reviews from music critics. At Metacritic, which assigns a normalized rating out of 100 to reviews from critics, the album received an average score of 71, which indicates "generally favorable reviews", based on 13 reviews.

Critics described the music on the album as synth-pop, dark wave, EBM and industrial dance.

Consequence of Sound critic Alex Young thought that the band is "crafty enough to pack TRST with enough of their own quirks and curveballs to make for a surprisingly fresh debut, one that'll likely prove difficult to follow." Daniel Sylvester of Exclaim! stated that the album "comes off less conceptual and more song-based than their image suggests," and added: "The truth is Trust are masters of delivery and flawless executioners, proving to be much better mechanics than designers." musicOMH's Tim Lee called the record "a hell of a debut" and "a reminder that as ubiquitous as they may become, there's plenty of life in the old synth yet."

NME's Kevin "EG" Perry was also positive in his assessment, stating: "Cool kids Trust never want to be seen to be trying too hard, but finale 'Sulk' is where it all comes together, like Chromatics with an evil glint in their eye." Benjamin Boles of Now praised the band's stylistic combination of goth rock and trance pop. Pitchfork's Larry Fitzmaurice wrote: "While the amount of raw material here may be daunting for some, there are plenty of surprising melodic moments to indulge in."

Nevertheless, Matt James of PopMatters was more mixed in his assessment of the album, describing it as "a sharp 'n' smartly entertaining synth-noir debut yet it falls just shy of hitting the truly big numbers."

== Track listing ==
All tracks are written by Robert Alfons and Maya Postepski.

No.	Title	Length
1.	"Shoom"	5:26
2.	"Dressed for Space"	3:37
3.	"Bulbform"	4:49
4.	"The Last Dregs"	5:25
5.	"Candy Walls"	4:37
6.	"Gloryhole"	5:01
7.	"This Ready Flesh"	3:25
8.	"F.T.F."	4:09
9.	"Heaven"	4:56
10.	"Chrissy E"	4:15
11.	"Sulk"	6:18
Total length:		51:58

Digital and Australian CD bonus tracks
No.	Title	Length
12.	"The Dazzle"	5:16
13.	"F.T.F." (Dinamo Azari for the Humanities Remix)	4:54
Total length:		62:08

== Personnel ==
Credits adapted from the liner notes of Trst.

=== TR/ST ===
- Robert Alfons – performance, production (all tracks); mixing (tracks 5, 8)
- Maya Postepski – performance, production (all tracks); mixing (tracks 5, 8)

=== Additional personnel ===
- Emily Lazar – mastering
- Heba Kadry – mastering
- Damian Taylor – mixing (tracks 1–4, 6, 7, 9–11)

=== Artwork ===
- Mikey Apples – artwork, layout
- Robert Alfons – photography, artwork, layout

== Release history ==
Region	Date	Label
North America	February 28, 2012	Arts & Crafts
Australia	May 18, 2012	Start Stop/Arts & Crafts
United Kingdom	October 22, 2012	Arts & Crafts
