= Tottenham Hotspur F.C. supporters =

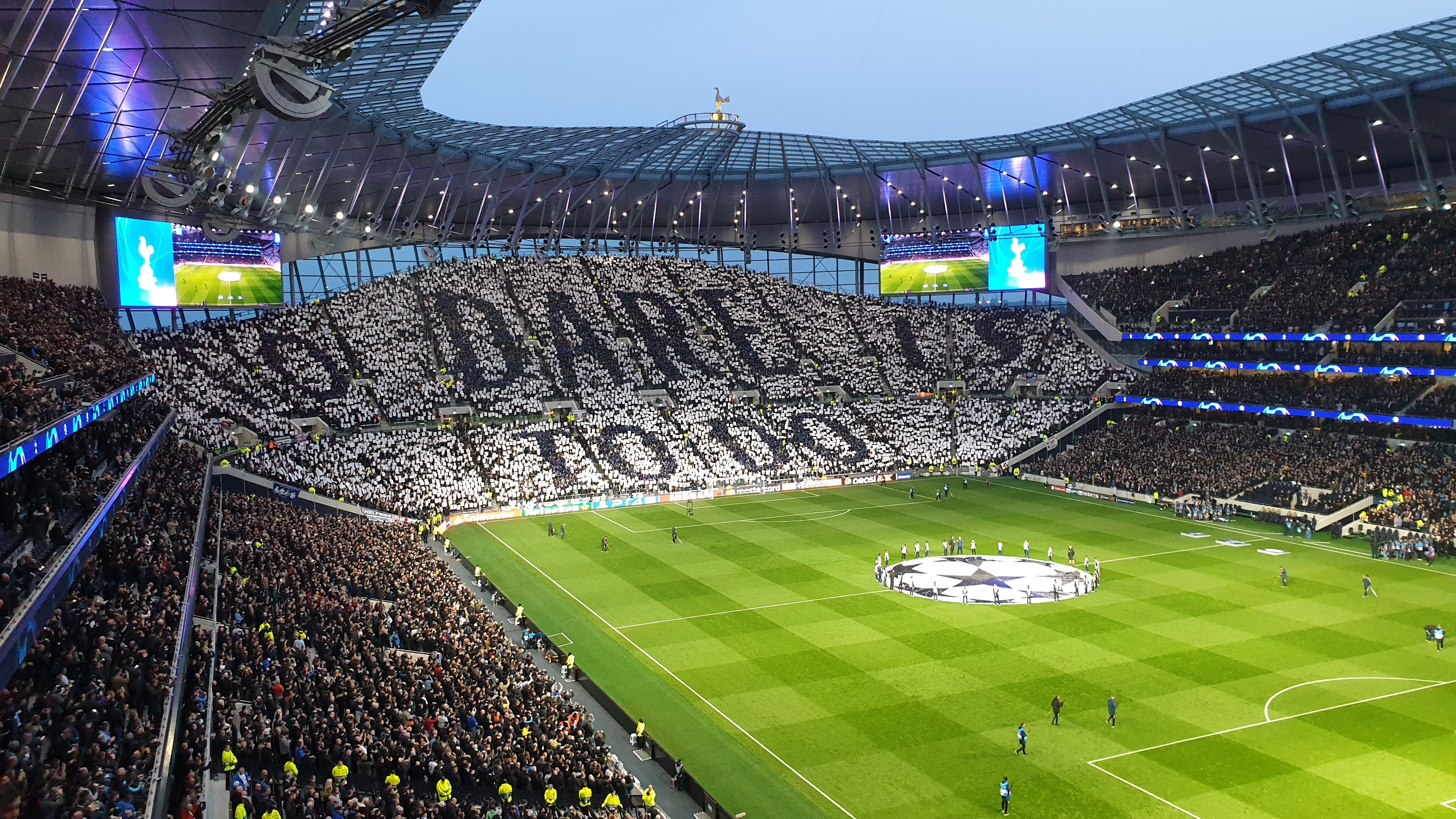
Spurs fans displaying the club motto 'To Dare Is to Do' on the South Stand of Tottenham Hotspur Stadium before the UEFA Champions League quarter-final with Manchester City on 9 April 2019.

The fanbase of Tottenham Hotspur F.C. was initially drawn primarily from North London and the nearby home counties, but the fanbase has expanded worldwide and there is now a great number of fans around the world. The club has one of the best attendance figures in the Premier League for its matches, and it holds the record attendances in the Premier League. There is a long-standing rivalry with Arsenal, and the North London derby is considered the most important of their matches by the fans.

Tottenham Hotspur has an active fanbase that forms organisations to support the team and interact with other members. They also engage with the club and had at times exerted their influence over the club on various issues in its history. They have published fanzines and established an online presence in fansites, forums and blogs dedicated to the club.

== Demographics ==
The support for Tottenham Hotspur traditionally comes from the North London area and the nearby home counties such as Hertfordshire and parts of Essex. An analysis by the Oxford Internet Institute that maps the locations of football fans using tweets about Premier League clubs during the 2012–13 season showed Tottenham to be the most popular on Twitter in 11 London boroughs (mostly in the North London area) and around 60 postcodes, compared to 3 London boroughs and 25 postcodes for Arsenal. However, the club being local is of lesser importance in recent times, a 2008 survey indicates that only 27% of fans first attended the club's home matches because it is local. On average, fans who attended the club's matches lived 45–50 miles (70–80 kilometres) from the club in surveys.

Although football is traditionally considered a working class sport, around three-quarters of Tottenham supporters are broadly defined as middle class. In 2007, 30% of Spurs supporters earned more than £50,000, and the average wage of the supporters was £45,000, compared to the median average yearly salary for the country as a whole of around £20,000 at that time. The club is located in one of the most ethnically diverse and poorest parts of London, Northumberland Park in Haringey, but only 8–9% of people of non-White ethnic background attended their matches according to the 2007 and 2008 surveys, although that is higher than the national average of 6%. The fanbase is also predominantly male, with around 11–13% of its supporters female in the 2007/2008 surveys, which is below the average of 15% for Premier League clubs. The cost of attending football matches has affected the age of fans, with younger fans being increasingly priced out of the game. Tottenham has seen a sharp rise in ticket prices in the Premier League era, and it had the most expensive season tickets in the Premier League in the 2018–2020 seasons. The average age of Tottenham season ticket holders was estimated to be 43 in 2016 and rising.

Estimates of the size of the club's fanbase vary, the club claims to have three million fans in the UK, and over 180 million around the world who follow the team's progress. 80 million of them are said to be in Asia, with close to 45 million people in China, and Indonesia registered the most followers for the club on Facebook in 2014. Tottenham Hotspur has a combined global social media following of over 90 million as of 2023. They are the most popular Premier League club on TikTok with over 24 million followers, almost 4 million more than the second most-followed Premier League club. It is ranked sixth of the major Premier League clubs on selected social networks, but has grown rapidly, adding four times more followers in China's Weibo than Arsenal in 2018.

The growth of fans worldwide is driven to some extent by the ubiquity of Premier League matches broadcast around the world, but some overseas fans also travel to London to attend Tottenham matches, with 40,000 having visited White Hart Lane in 2014. Interest in the club in other countries may also be driven by the players, for example, it was claimed in 2022 that there were 12 million Spurs fans in South Korea as a result of South Korean winger Son Heung-min playing for the club. Support in Australia also increased following the appointment of Australian Ange Postecoglou as manager, the first Australian to become a Premier League manager and Tottenham have become one of the most popular Premier League clubs in Australia. Tottenham matches in Australia have drawn large crowds.

Historically, the club had a significant Jewish following from the Jewish communities in North and East London that sprung up in the late 19th and early 20th century. It was once claimed that all Jews who attended football matches in the 1920s were Spurs supporters, and it was also estimated that 10,000 Spurs supporters, around a third of those who attended a Tottenham match in 1935, were Jewish. The decision in 1935 to hold a friendly match between Nazi Germany and England at White Hart Lane therefore led to protests from the Jewish communities. Jewish involvement extends to the boardroom; former chairman Fred Bearman first joined the Tottenham board in 1909, and the three chairmen of the club since 1984 had all been Jewish businessmen with prior history of supporting the club. The club, however, no longer has a greater Jewish contingent among its fans than other major London clubs; for example Arsenal, whose Jewish support started in the 1930s, is believed to have similar level of Jewish supporters. Although around 10–11% of season ticket holders and other selected fans who responded to surveys on the Jewish-related issue of "Yid" in 2014 and 2019 identified themselves as Jewish, it is estimated that Jewish supporters form at most 5% of its regular fanbase.

== Attendance ==
13,000 fans attended a cup tie at Northumberland Park in 1899

Tottenham Hotspur were formed by a group of schoolboys, and those who attended their matches in the early days were likely to be friends and families. Their matches soon attracted the attention of the locals in the growing suburbs of Tottenham, and the first competitive game by Tottenham in 1885 recorded a figure of 400 spectators. Within a few years the home matches of the club drew crowds of up to 4,000, although these were non-paying spectators as they played on public ground at that time. Tottenham moved to an enclosed ground at Northumberland Park where they can charge an entrance fee in 1888, and joined the Southern League in 1896. In their first few years in the league, the attendance averaged at around 2,000. A United League match against Arsenal in 1898 drew 14,000 spectators, and such high attendances necessitated a move to a larger ground.

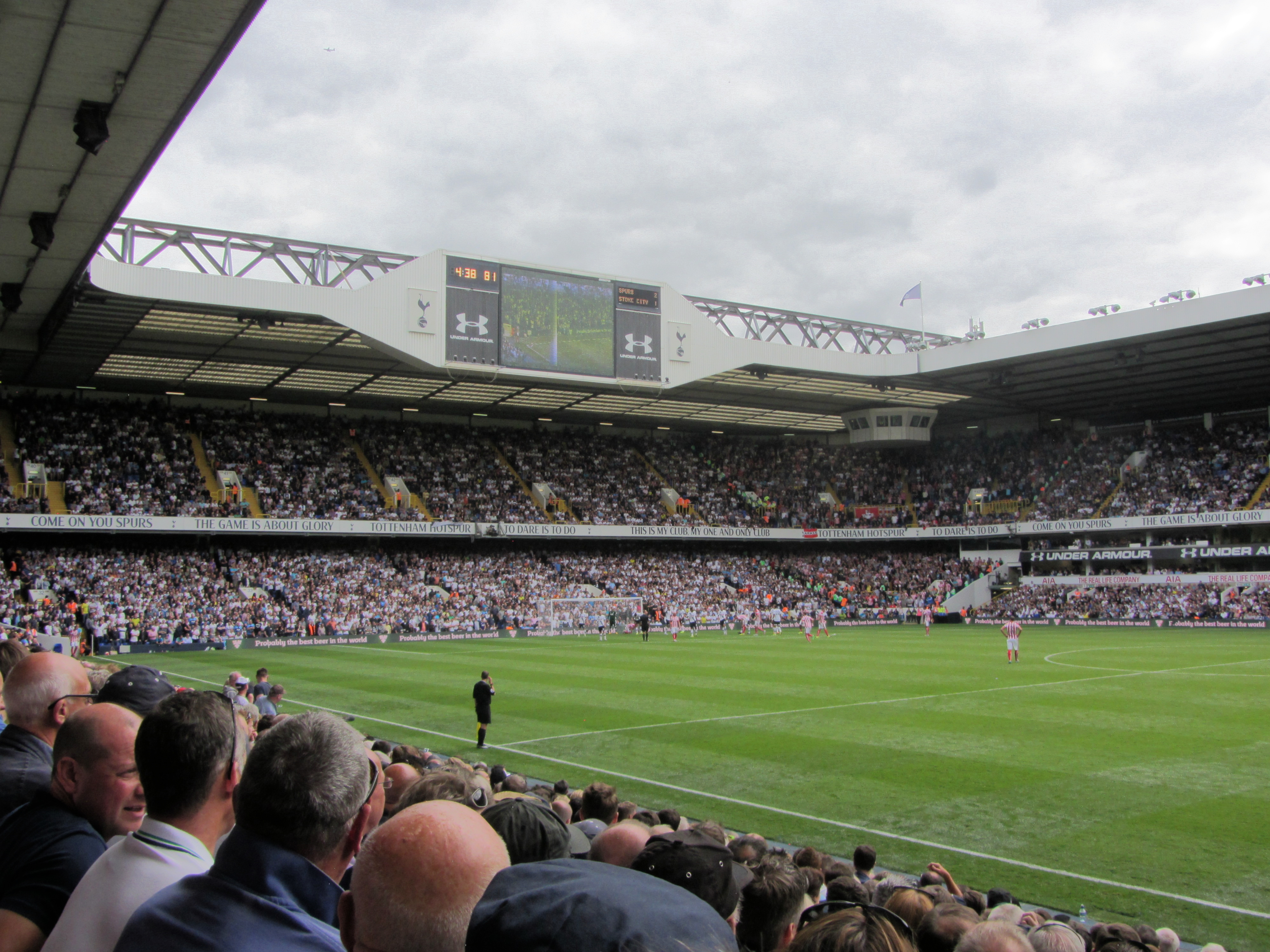
36,000 fans at a match at White Hart Lane in 2015

Tottenham relocated to White Hart Lane in 1899, and average attendance by then had surpassed 4,000. In the first few years of the 20th century, the home attendances for Southern League matches usually numbered 7,000 to 10,000, but may reach over 30,000 for some cup ties. Their 1901 FA Cup Final against Sheffield United played at Crystal Palace had 110,820 spectators, at that time a record for a football match. They joined the Football League in 1908, and home attendances steadily increased. After the First World War, the club had 20 years of high attendances. In the 1930s, even though the club was in Division Two most years, they had attendances of over 30,000 for many matches. In March 1938, 75,038 spectators attended a cup tie against Sunderland, the highest gate for the club not surpassed until 2016.

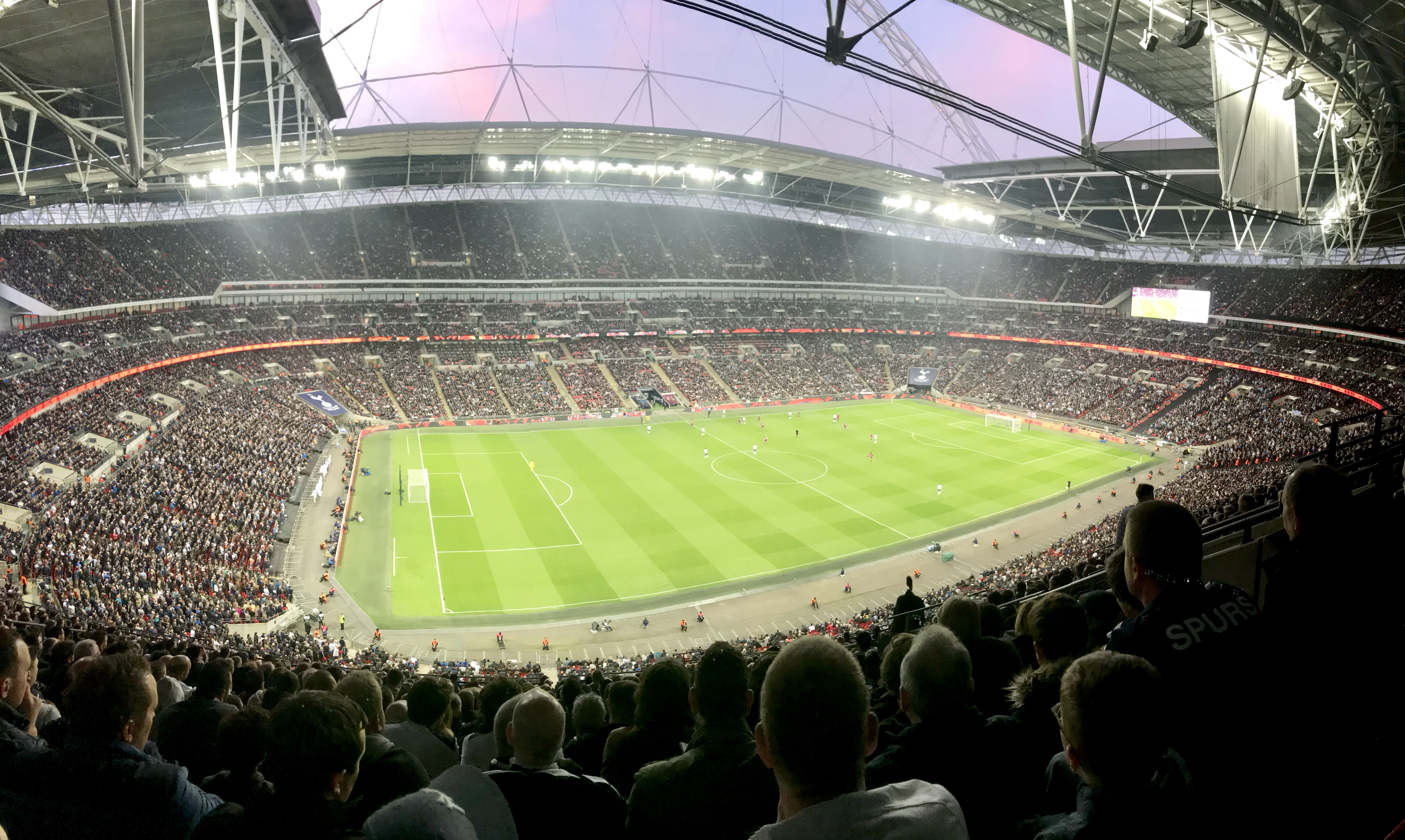
Over 80,000 fans attending a home match at Wembley Stadium in 2018

The attendance figures for Tottenham's home matches have fluctuated over the years. Five times between 1950 and 1962, Tottenham had the highest average attendance in England, with over 55,000 recorded in the 1950–51 season. However, average attendance fell below 21,000 in the 1985–86 season. Home attendances have since recovered, and average attendance numbers at Tottenham's former ground White Hart Lane in the 2000s were close to its all-seater capacity at between 35,000 and 36,000. In the 2017–18 season, when Tottenham used the 90,000-capacity Wembley Stadium as its home ground, it had the second highest average attendance in the Premier League at nearly 68,000. Their highest home attendance figure was recorded at the 2016–17 UEFA Champions League game against Bayer Leverkusen, when 85,512 attended, a record for any English club. The club also registered a series of record attendances for Premier League matches in the 2017–18 season, the highest being the North London derby on 10 February 2018 which was attended by 83,222 spectators.

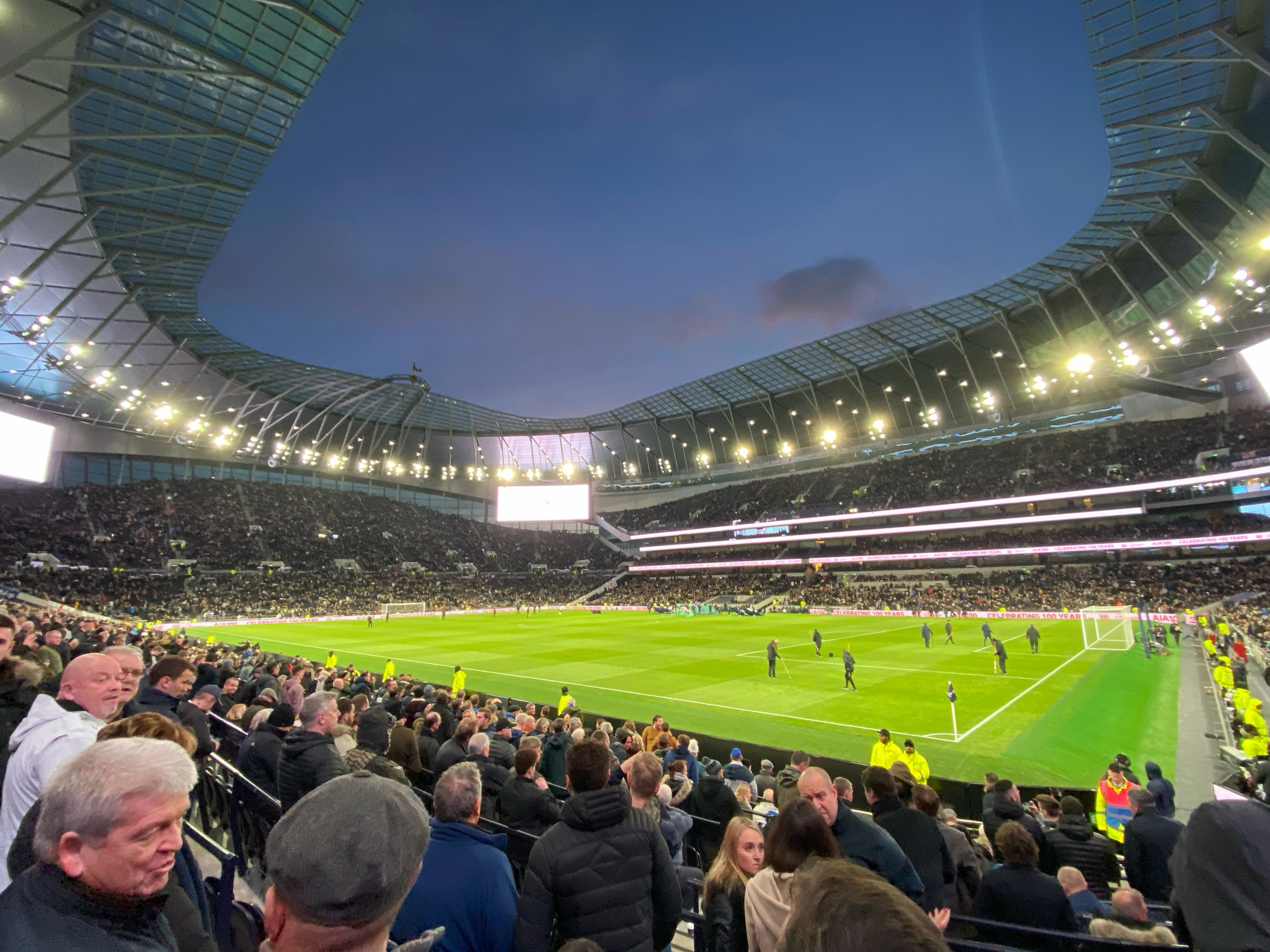
61,000 fans at the Tottenham Hotspur Stadium in 2019

The club moved to the Tottenham Hotspur Stadium in 2019, and attendance averaged between 59 and 60,000 in the first two seasons at the new stadium. The highest attendance so far is 62,027 recorded for the North London derby against Arsenal on 12 May 2022. The attendance number recorded in this stadium is the actual number of fans going through the gates rather than the number of tickets issued used for many other grounds where the attendance figures may include season ticket holders who did not turn up for matches and unused free tickets.

== Supporters groups ==
An early fan club was the Spurs Supporters Club, formed independently by fans in 1948 but became officially recognised by Tottenham in the early 1960s. It was once the largest supporters club in the country; it had nearly 4,000 members in 1950, over 6,000 in the early 1970s and once reached 10,000 with members from around the world, such as Malta, South Africa, Australia, the United States and the Scandinavian countries. It had its offices in Warmington House in front of the West Stand of White Hart Lane from 1963 to 1989. It organised trips to away matches, and was the first in the country to organise large-scale away trips for fans, the biggest during the European Cup-Winners' Cup final in Amsterdam in 1963 for thousands of fans. It also organised social outings and published a magazine The Lilywhite. This supporters' club is now defunct, but many supporters clubs affiliated with Tottenham have since been set up, and there are over 440 official supporters' clubs in over 80 countries around the world. An early overseas supporters' club was formed in Malta in 1981 as a branch of the Spurs Supporters Club, and another was formed in Norway in 1982. The earliest Spurs supporters' club in the United States was LA Spurs formed in 2005. In Australia, OzSpurs is the official supporters' group of Tottenham Hotspur which has chapters in many cities.

A number of independent supporters groups have been formed in the club's history, representing fans to challenge decisions made by the club. Some of them had significant influence on the club's history. Left on the Shelf (LOTS) was formed in 1988 to protest over a plan to remove The Shelf, a stretch of raised terrace on the East Stand of White Hart Lane favoured by fans, and replace it with executive boxes. LOTS failed to stop the redevelopment, but managed to keep a small part of The Shelf (referred to by fans as The Ledge, which lasted until the stadium became all-seater). LOTS inspired further fans' activism, and the following Tottenham Independent Supporters Association (TISA) was formed at a time when Tottenham was facing a financial crisis. The early actions of TISA were to organise a successful fans' campaign against a possible takeover of Tottenham by Robert Maxwell, protests against Irving Scholar, and it organised small shareholders so they may have a voice in the boardroom. It later also supported Terry Venables after he was sacked by Alan Sugar. It was one of the first supporters groups in England to mobilise fans to focus on specific issues and generate media publicity, actions later emulated by fans of other clubs. Other groups formed to campaign on various issues include Tottenham Action Group, and Save Our Spurs formed to pressure Sugar to sell the club. Sugar blamed the actions by hostile fans when he decided to sell the club in 2000. In 2010, "We are N17" was formed to oppose a plan to relocate Tottenham's home stadium to the Olympic Stadium in Stratford.

In July 1997, the Labour government established the Football Task Force, which led to the formation of Supporters Direct in 2000 and initiated the Supporters' Trust movement. TISA was disbanded after the Tottenham Hotspur Supporters' Trust (THST) was formed in 2001, an organisation which is officially recognised by the club as representatives for Spurs supporters. THST protested and strongly criticised the club over a plan to form a European Super League in 2021. After the club withdrew from the Super League, club chairman Daniel Levy proposed plans for a Club Advisory Panel of supporters and their representation on the board.

In the 2011–12 season, The Fighting Cock set up an informal grouping, the 1882 Movement, to support the team and improve the atmosphere in the stadium. It initially supported the youth-team and under-21 fixtures, but later extended to the main senior matches. The movement did not have a formal membership but those involved were mostly younger fans, the gathering of these fans however led to the club banning them from certain section of the stadium, later allocating a block of seats to these fans.

=== By country ===
Number of officially recognised supporters' groups by country
Country	Clubs	Country	Club	Country	Club
Argentina	2	Armenia	1	Australia	12
Austria	1	Azerbaijan	1	Bahrain	1
Bangladesh	2	Barbados	2	Belarus	1
Belgium	4	Bermuda	1	Botswana	1
Brazil	1	Brunei	1	Bulgaria	1
Cambodia	1	Canada	6	Chile	2
China	10	Colombia	1	Costa Rica	1
Cuba	1	Cyprus	2	Czech Republic	1
Denmark	1	Dominican Republic	1	Egypt	1
Estonia	1	Eswatini	1	Finland	1
France	3	Germany	13	Ghana	1
Greece	2	Guernsey	1	Honduras	1
Hong Kong	1	Hungary	1	Iceland	1
India	21	Indonesia	36	Iran	2
Ireland	16	Isle of Man	1	Israel	2
Italy	6	Jamaica	1	Japan	3
Jersey	1	Kuwait	1	Latvia	1
Lebanon	1	Liberia	1	Lithuania	1
Macau	1	Malaysia	3	Malta	1
Mauritius	1	Mexico	1	Mongolia	1
Morocco	1	Myanmar	1	Namibia	1
Nepal	1	Netherlands	1	New Zealand	1
Nigeria	2	Norway	1	Pakistan	1
Peru	1	Poland	1	Portugal	2
Qatar	1	Romania	1	Russia	2
Senegal	1	Serbia	3	Singapore	1
Slovenia	1	Somalia	1	South Africa	5
South Korea	4	Spain	4	Sri Lanka	1
Sweden	28	Switzerland	1	Taiwan	1
Thailand	7	Turkey	2	Turks and Caicos Islands	1
Tunisia	1	Uganda	1	Ukraine	1
United Arab Emirates	1	United Kingdom	76	United States	141
Vietnam	1	Zimbabwe	1		

== Fanzines and online fandom ==
Apart from The Lilywhite from the Spurs Supporters Club and the official Spurs Monthly magazine once published by Tottenham, many fanzines dedicated to the club have been published over the years, some of these were short-lived, but some lasted longer. Fans were inspired by the success of When Saturday Comes to publish their own fanzines dedicated to their own club. The Spur was first published in 1988 and lasted until 1994, others include My Eyes Have Seen the Glory (MEHSTG) which was published in the early 1990s to 2007, and CADD (Cock A Doodle Do) from the mid to late 1990s. These print magazines have closed due to rising cost of production, and fan publications have since moved online, such as The Fighting Cock, which tried to continue producing a print fanzine. There are many fansites, forums, blogs and podcasts dedicated to the club.

== Songs and chants ==
=== "Glory, Glory, Tottenham Hotspur" ===
Glory Glory Tottenham Hotspur

Glory glory Tottenham Hotspur,
Glory glory Tottenham Hotspur,
Glory glory Tottenham Hotspur,
And the Spurs go marching on

—

There are many football songs and chants associated with the club and frequently sung by Spurs fans, the most significant of which is "Glory Glory Tottenham Hotspur". The song originated in 1961 after Spurs completed the Double in 1960–61, and the club entered the European Cup for the first time. Their first opponents were Górnik Zabrze, the Polish champions, and after a hard-fought match Spurs suffered a 4–2 reverse. Tottenham's tough tackling prompted the Polish press to describe them as "they were no angels". These comments incensed a group of three fans and for the return match at White Hart Lane they dressed as angels wearing white sheets fashioned into togas, sandals, false beards and carrying placards bearing biblical-type slogans. The angels were allowed on the perimeter of the pitch and their fervour whipped up the home fans who responded with a rendition of "Glory Glory Hallelujah", which is still sung on terraces at White Hart Lane and other football grounds. The Lilywhites also responded to the atmosphere to win the tie 8–1. Then manager of Spurs, Bill Nicholson, wrote in his autobiography:

A new sound was heard in English football in the 1961–2 season. It was the hymn Glory, Glory Hallelujah being sung by 60,000 fans at White Hart Lane in our European Cup matches. I don't know how it started or who started it, but it took over the ground like a religious feeling.

— Bill Nicholson

"Glory Glory Tottenham Hotspur" is still frequently sung by fans, and it is played at home games, especially after a win. The song has also been adapted for use by other clubs such as Manchester United and Leeds United since.

=== Other songs ===
Everywhere we go

Everywhere we go,
Everywhere we go,
It's the Tottenham boys,
Making all the noise
Everywhere we go.

—

A song most commonly sung by fans before, during and after matches is "When the Spurs Go Marching In". The song is usually sung with raised outstretched arms and moving fingers, typically starting slower for a couple of verses before getting faster and with hand-clapping.

The fans sing a number of songs that identify themselves with the club, such as "We are Tottenham, Super Tottenham, We are Tottenham, From the Lane" sung to the tune of "Sailing", or express their love for the club, such as "We love you Tottenham, we do". To encourage the team, fans chant "Come on you Spurs!" (which commonly appears in written form as COYS). Groups of fans on different stands may sing according to where they sit, those in the South Stand may sing "We're the Park Lane, We're the Park Lane, We're the Park Lane Tottenham", and those on the East Stand may then respond with "We're the Shelf side..." – 'the Shelf' was a raised terrace on the East Stand of White Hart Lane favoured by fans, which was removed in the late 1980s but is still associated with the East Stand. Those in the North Stand sing "We're the Paxton".

A number of other songs are commonly played in the stadium, such as "Can't Smile Without You" by Barry Manilow, and "Duel of the Fates", a theme from the Star Wars films, usually played when the players come out on to the field. "McNamara's Band" has been played at Tottenham's grounds for over half a century, now usually when the team emerge at half-time for the second half. Some believe the song is a tribute to the former team captain Danny Blanchflower who was Irish.

The club has a tradition of releasing songs since 1961 when they released "Tip Top Tottenham Hotspur" in celebration of winning the Double. An album of Spurs players singing songs was released to commemorate the 1967 FA Cup Final. A number of songwriters who are fans of the club have written songs for the club which were released as singles. Of note are the duo Chas & Dave, whose songs include "Ossie's Dream/Spurs Are on Their Way to Wembley", "Tottenham, Tottenham", "Hot Shot Tottenham!", and "When the Year Ends in One", some of which are still sung by fans. Another song written by a fan Harold Spiro titled "Nice One Cyril", originally written about a Spurs player Cyril Knowles, is sometimes still used as a chant, most recently for the Korean player Son Heung-min.

Fans often use familiar tunes popularly sung at various football grounds as chants, but with lyrics tailored to the club. Most commonly, new chants are created for players; for example, popular chants in the later part of 2010s include chants for Dele Alli set to the tune of Billy Ray Cyrus' "Achy Breaky Heart", Moussa Sissoko using White Stripes' "Seven Nation Army", Christian Eriksen with Black Lace's "Agadoo", Danny Rose with Boney M.'s "Daddy Cool", Harry Kane as "One of Our Own" (Beach Boys' "Sloop John B"), as well as one for the manager Mauricio Pochettino sung to the tune of "Magic" by Pilot. Many songs have been used over many decades as chants; for example "Guantanamera" which has been used for numerous players including Paul Gascoigne ("There's only one Paul Gascoigne") and Gary Stevens ("There's only two Gary Stevens" since there were two players of the same name active at the same time), and "Land of Hope and Glory" (most recently used for Eric Dier).

Although some songs and chants such as "Glory Glory Tottenham Hotspur" have lasted for a long time, most chants are often popular only for a relatively short time as players move on and time changes. For example, fans in the 1960s sang "Jennings is better than Yashin, Greaves is better than Eusébio", but as players moved to other clubs and the context no longer relevant to fans in later eras, it stopped being sung. Older songs get discarded, while new songs are constantly being created for players or to reflect current events, many of which are directed against their rival Arsenal and other clubs. Examples of songs created in the 2018–19 season are a song based on "December, 1963 (Oh, What a Night)" to mock Arsenal's failure to qualify for the UEFA Champions League, and a song "Allez Allez Allez" (based on an Italian song "L'Estate Sta Finendo") celebrating a dramatic win over Manchester City in the Champions League quarter-final.

== Jewish association ==
Being a Yid

We sang it in France,
We sang it in Spain,
We sing in the sun and we sing in the rain,
They tried to stop us, but look what it did,
Cos the thing I love most is being a Yid.
Being a Yid, being a Yid,
The thing I love most is being a Yid.

— Sung to the tune of "Tom Hark" by The Piranhas

Due to the club's historical association with Jewish supporters, Tottenham is identified as a Jewish club by rival fans, even though it no longer has a greater number of Jewish fans than other major London clubs. Antisemitic chants directed at the club and its supporters by rival fans have been heard since the 1960s, with abusive chants using "Yids" to describe Spurs fans, or "Yiddo Yiddo", or hissing to simulate the sound of gassing of Jews in extermination camps. In response to the abusive chants, Tottenham supporters, Jewish and non-Jewish alike, began to chant back the insults and adopt the Yid identity starting from around the late 1970s. Tottenham Fans chant "Yiddo, Yiddo" repeatedly, "Yid", or "Yid Army". Some fans view adopting "Yid" as a way of reclaiming the word as a badge of honour and pride, helping defuse its power as an insult. The "yid" word has become so commonly associated with Tottenham that in January 2020 the Oxford English Dictionary extended the definition of "yid" to "a supporter of or player for Tottenham Hotspur Football Club". A survey commissioned by the club in 2013 showed that the majority of the club's supporters, 74% of non-Jewish respondents and 73% of Jewish respondents, approved of its use by their own fans, with 67% regularly chanted the word. A later survey released in December 2019 showed close to half of its respondents (45%) either preferred to use it less (23%), or not use it altogether (22%), but 74% of the fans did use the word regularly or occasionally, with younger fans most likely to use the term (only 6% of those in the 18–24 age group did not chant the word compared to 73% of those over 75).

The use of "Yid" for self-identification, however, has been controversial. Some Jewish people proclaimed that the word is offensive and its use by Spurs fans "legitimis[es denigrating] references to Jews in football", arguing that such "racist abuse" should be stamped out of football. Both the World Jewish Congress and the Board of Deputies of British Jews have denounced the use of the "Yid", "Yiddo", and "Yid army" by fans.

Some Jewish fans of the club, however, including Simon Schama, Frank Furedi, Gerald Jacobs and David Aaronovitch, have written in support of its use by Spurs' fans. The Prime Minister David Cameron stated that there is "a difference between Spurs fans self-describing ... as Yids and someone calling someone [else] a Yid as an insult," as its use by the Spurs fans is not motivated by hate and therefore cannot be considered hate speech. Attempts to prosecute Tottenham fans who chanted the words have failed, as the Crown Prosecution Service considered that the words as used by Tottenham fans could not be legally judged as "threatening, abusive or insulting". The Metropolitan Police no longer regards the chanting of "Yid" by Tottenham fans an arrestable offence. The club itself, while acknowledging its use by Spurs fans to be an expression of solidarity with the club and a defensive stance against antisemitic abuse by rival fans, has asked fans of the club to reduce or abandon the use of "a word considered abusive outside its fanbase."

== Rivalries ==
Tottenham v Arsenal in the North London derby in April 2010. Tottenham fans are singing a chant, which condemns Sol Campbell and praises Ledley King

Tottenham supporters have rivalries with several clubs, mainly within the London area, the most significant of which is with their north London rivals Arsenal. The rivalry began in 1913 when Arsenal, then called Woolwich Arsenal, moved from the Manor Ground, Plumstead to Arsenal Stadium, Highbury, an area Tottenham considered to be their territory. This rivalry intensified in 1919 when Arsenal were unexpectedly promoted to the First Division, taking a place that Tottenham believed should be theirs. The resentment over Arsenal's move to North London has led to Spurs fans continually referring to Arsenal as being from Woolwich to stress that Arsenal were from South London. The North London Derby is regarded as the fiercest rivalry between London clubs.

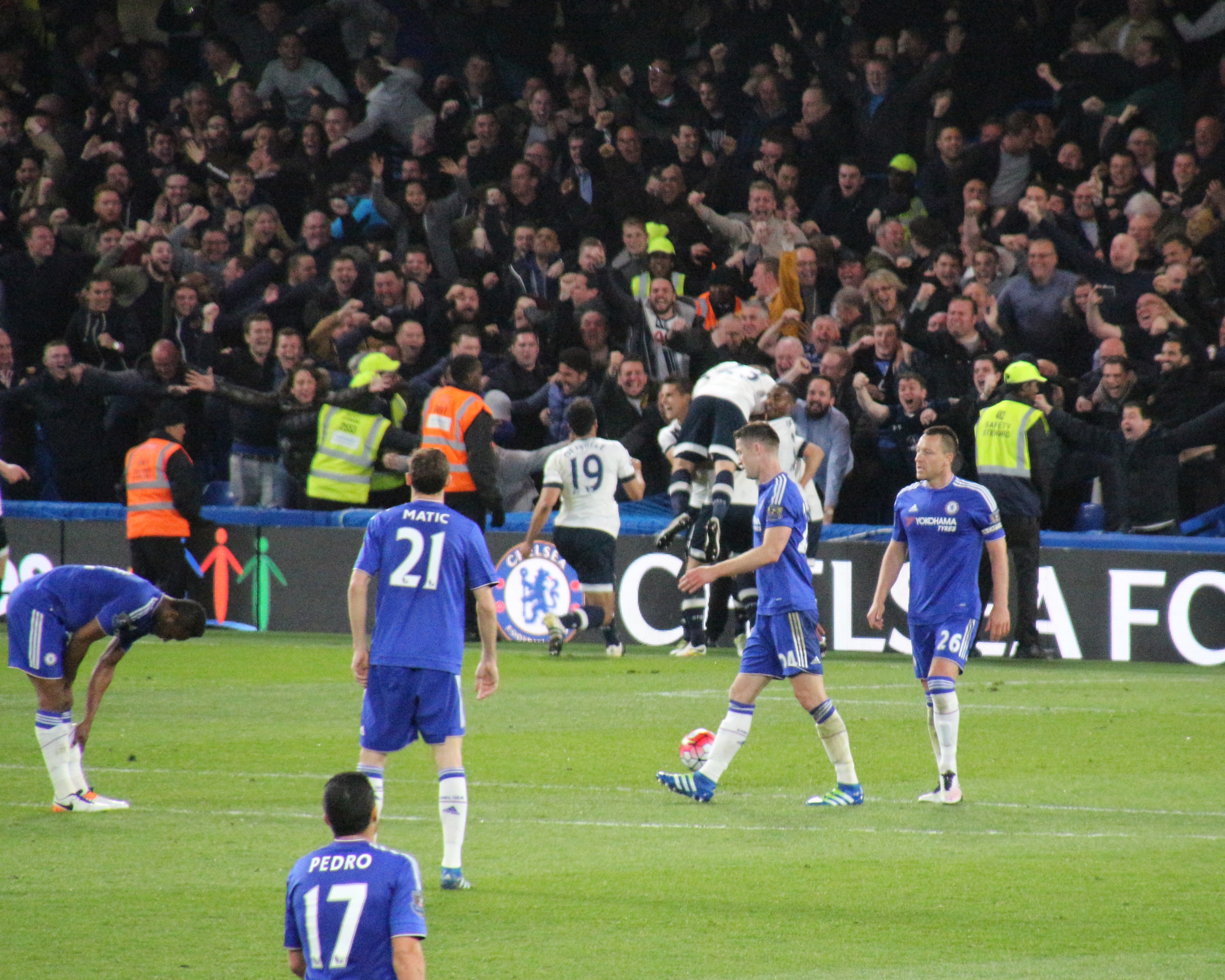
Chelsea v Tottenham in May 2016 in a match dubbed the Battle of Stamford Bridge. Spurs players celebrated in front of fans after a goal, but Chelsea ended Spurs' chance of winning the league by drawing 2–2.

They also have rivalries with fellow London clubs Chelsea and West Ham United, albeit on a less intense level. The rivalry with Chelsea started in the 1967 FA Cup Final, the first ever all-London final that was won by a Tottenham team that featured former Chelsea players Terry Venables and Jimmy Greaves. The rivalry with West Ham is largely a one-sided affair on the part of West Ham. While West Ham's traditional rivalry is with Millwall, with Millwall often in a different league, West Ham fans, when in the top division, have directed their attention at Tottenham Hotspur. A 2018 survey indicated that most Tottenham fans consider Arsenal their biggest rival, followed by Chelsea, and then West Ham. On the other hand, fans of Arsenal, Chelsea, and West Ham all regard Tottenham as their biggest rival.

=== Neologisms and phrases ===
A number of words and phrases are often repeated by rival fans to taunt Tottenham fans. Arsenal fans celebrate St Totteringham's Day, a term believed to be first used in 2002, which is the day when it became mathematically impossible for Tottenham to finish above Arsenal in that season. Spurs fans have created their own rival versions but no one version has so far caught on among fans. A new word that has gained wide currency among fans as well as the media to become part of football lexicon is "Spursy". The word is said to have been coined by a Spurs fan in 2013 to describe flair Spurs players who may "go missing at Stoke on a cold February evening". The adjective "Spursy", and its derived noun "Spursiness", then came to be used to denote a certain fragility in the team that consistently fail to live up to expectations and crumble within sight of victory. A phrase also commonly repeated by rival fans is "Lads, it's Tottenham", first said by former Manchester United manager Alex Ferguson in a pre-match team-talk, to show that Tottenham are weak and easily beatable.

== Hooliganism ==
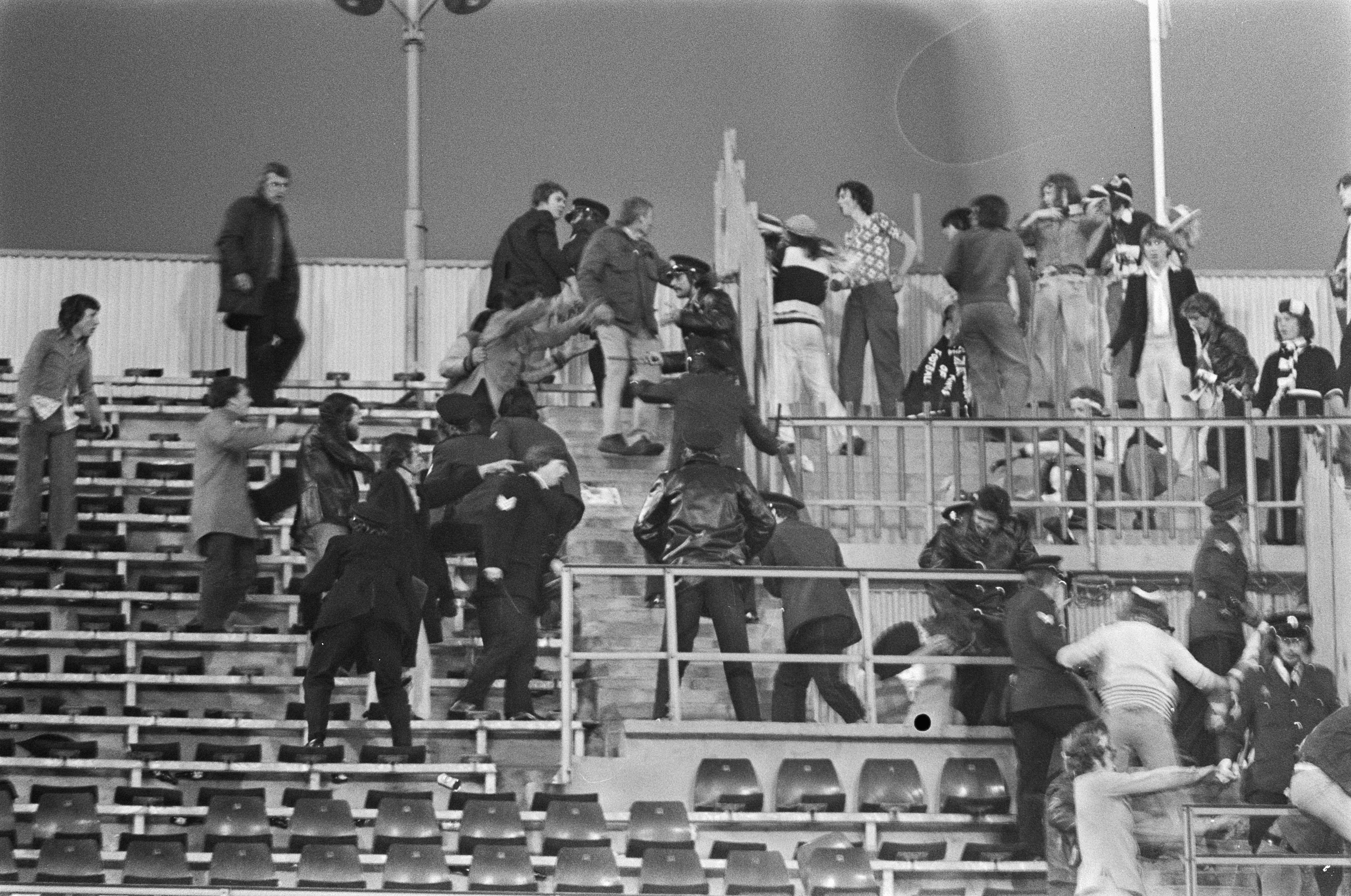
Police removing fans from the terrace after a disturbance at the 1974 UEFA Cup Final in Rotterdam

There had been a number of incidents of hooliganism involving Spurs fans, most notably in the 1970s and 1980s. Crowd troubles at football grounds however had been reported much earlier. For example, in 1897, Spurs fans upset by a goal given resulting from what appeared to be a handball attacked three Luton players, and the Northumberland Park ground was then closed for two weeks by the FA as punishment. In 1904, overcrowding at White Hart Lane during an FA Cup match against Aston Villa led to fans spilling onto the pitch, which resulted in the abandonment of the game after 20 minutes followed by a pitch invasion by angry spectators. The club was fined £350 over the incidence and ordered to erect a low steel fence around the pitch.

The first incidence just before the 1970s period to receive significant press attention, dubbed The Battle of Flitwick, occurred in September 1969. Spurs fans on their way home after their team lost at Derby damaged the train carrying them. They were then ejected from the train before it reached London, whereupon they created a major disturbance in the town of Flitwick. The worst occurrence of hooliganism, however, was the rioting by Spurs fans in Rotterdam at the 1974 UEFA Cup Final against Feyenoord before and during the match. 200 were injured and Tottenham were banned from playing in White Hart Lane for two European matches as a result. Spurs fans again rioted in Rotterdam during the 1983–84 UEFA Cup match against Feyenoord, and then before the final against Anderlecht in Brussels, and a Spurs fan was shot dead. Although fan violence has since abated, the occasional incidents of hooliganism continued to be reported.

== In popular culture ==
- Those Glory Glory Days, a TV film with a semi-autobiographical story by Julie Welch broadcast on Channel 4. It tells of a group of teenage girls who supported Tottenham Hotspur at the time when they won the Double, and features an appearance by Spurs captain of that time Danny Blanchflower.
- In Till Death Us Do Part, the character Alf Garnett, a West Ham fan, frequently rants against "those Spurs Yids". However, the actor who played Alf Garnett, Warren Mitchell, was himself Jewish and a Spurs fan. Some thought that the Alf Garnett character inspired the use of "Yids" directed at Tottenham supporters, although such use by rival fans may have already existed in the early 1960s before the show was broadcast, and the writer of the show simply picked up on its use by rival fans.
- A number of fictional characters are written as Spurs supporters, some written by fans of the club. They include Gavin Shipman of Gavin & Stacey created by Mathew Horne, the character Clive created by Peter Cook, and Norman Stanley Fletcher from Porridge.
- Several musical groups who are fans of the club have released singles related to the club; they include Chas & Dave, Cockerel Chorus, and The Lillies.
