= Chas & Dave discography =

This is a discography of the British duo Chas & Dave. Included are single and album releases and their UK chart peaks.

== Albums ==
Year	Album title	UK Chart	Label
1974	Oily Rags (as Oily Rags)	-	Signature
1975	One Fing 'n' Anuvver	-	Retreat, EMI, Saraband
1977	Rockney	-	EMI
1979	Don't Give a Monkeys	-	Rockney
1979	Chas & Dave	-	Music for Pleasure
1979	Remember a Pint of Best Courage Do	-	Rockney
1981	Live at Abbey Road	-	EMI
1981	The Christmas Jamboree Bag	25	Warwick
1982	Mustn't Grumble	35	Rockney, Edsel
1982	Job Lot	59	Rockney
1983	Knees Up – Christmas Jamboree Bag No.2	7	Rockney
1983	Knees Up - Jamboree Bag No.2 - Special Radio Version	-	Rockney
1983	Aint No Pleasin' You	-	Liberation Records, True Trax
1983	18th Cambridge Folk Festival	-	BBC Transcription Services
1984	Well Pleased	27	Rockney
1984	Greatest Hits	16	Rockney, Transistor Records, Pegasus, EMI
1985	Jamboree Bag No.3	15	Rockney
1986	Christmas Carol Album	37	Telstar
1987	Flying	-	Bunce
1988	All the Best	-	K-Tel Records
1991	Chas & Dave's All Time Jamboree Bag	-	Castle Communications
1992	The Best of Chas & Dave	-	Castle Communications, Music Club
1995	Street Party	3	Telstar
1995	Rock 'n' Roll Party	-	Ronco Silver, Hallmark Music & Entertainment
1997	Give It Some Stick	-	Recall 2 cd
1998	The Greatest Hits Live	-	Prism Leisure
1998	Wallop! It's Party Time!	-	Castle Communications
2000	You're Never Too Old to Rock' n Roll	-	Cleveland International Records
2001	A Cockney Christmas with Chas 'n' Dave	-	Crimson Records
2001	Chas 'n' Dave's Double Bubble	-	Crimson Records
2001	A Christmas Knees-Up with Chas 'n' Dave	-	EMI
2002	Rock 'n' Roll Knees-Up	-	Music Digital
2003	The Chas & Dave Party Album	-	Dynamic Entertainment Ltd
2005	The Very Best of Chas 'n' Dave	86	EMI
2006	From Tottenham to Tennessee	-	Music Club
2009	100 Hits Legends	-	Demon Records
2013	That's What Happens	25	Warner Bros.
2013	Gertcha! The EMI Years	-	EMI
2014	Last Orders - LIVE	-	Snout Music LTD
2014	The Rockney Box 1981-1991	-	Edsel
2015	Enjoy Yourself	-	Demon Records
2015	Live at Rockpalast	-	Repertoire Records
2015	Greatest	-	Crimson Records
2016	Not Just Anuvver Beano	-	Snout Music Ltd
2018	Gold	8	Demon Records
2018	A Little Bit of Us	-	Warner Bros.
2019	Givin' It That	-	Edsel
2019	The Other Side of Chas & Dave	-	Edsel
2020	Christmas Gold	-	Demon
2023	Mustn't Grumble	-	Rockney

== Singles ==
Year	Single title	UK Chart	Label
1975	"Old Dog and Me"	-	Retreat
1975	"I Am a Rocker"	-	Retreat
1976	"Old Time Song"	-	Retreat
1978	"Strummin'"	52	EMI
1978	"What a Miserable Saturday Night"	-	EMI
1979	"Massage Parlour"	-	EMI
1979	"Gertcha"	20	EMI
1979	"The Sideboard Song"	55	EMI
1979	"It's Alright for Nothin'!" (EP)	-	Rockney
1980	"Rabbit"	8	Rockney
1981	"Poor Old Mr Woogie"	-	Rockney
1981	"Ossie's Dream (Spurs Are on Their Way to Wembley)" (uncredited with Tottenham Hotspur FA Cup Final Squad)	5	Rockney
1981	"Turn That Noise Down"	76	Rockney
1981	"Stars Over 45"	21	Rockney
1981	"Rabbit"		Sonet (Sweden)
1981	"Rabbit" (EP)		Courage
1981	"Mr. Woogie"	-	Rockney
1982	"Oh Darling (Dir Macht Keiner Was Recht)"	-	Telefunken (Germany)
1982	"Auld Lang Syne"	-	A&M Records
1982	"Ain't No Pleasing You"	2	Rockney
1982	"Tottenham, Tottenham" (uncredited with Tottenham Hotspur FA Cup Final Squad)	19	Rockney
1982	"Margate"	46	Rockney
1982	"Wish I Could Write a Love Song"	-	Rockney
1983	"London Girls"	63	Rockney
1983	"Beer Belly Banjos (Roll Out the Barrels)"	111	Rockney
1983	"My Melancholy Baby"	51	Rockney
1984	"There in Your Eyes"	91	Rockney
1984	"I Wonder in Whose Arms..."	102	Rockney
1984	"Harry Was a Champion"	124	Rockney
1985	"Rock 'n' Roll Jamboree"	101	Rockney
1985	"In Sickness and in Health"	95	BBC
1986	"You're Just in Love"	118	Rockney
1986	"Snooker Loopy" (with The Matchroom Mob)	6	Rockney
1986	"Halley's Comet"	187	Rockney
1986	"Long Long Ago" (with the Cambridge Heath Salvation Army Band)	143	Hodgecock
1987	"Romford Rap" (with The Matchroom Mob)	91	Rainbow
1987	"Hot Shot Tottenham!" (uncredited with Tottenham Hotspur FC)	18	Rainbow
1987	"Flying (Home)"	88	Bunce
1987	"The Diddlum Song (Diddle Ummaday)"	-	Bunce
1989	"I Can Get Along Without You"	162	A.1.
1991	"When the Year Ends in One" (uncredited with Tottenham Hotspur Football Club)	44	A.1.
1991	"The Victory Song" (with Tottenham Hotspur FC)	-	Glory
1991	"When Days Were Long (But Far Too Short)"	-	Essential
1996	"Ain't No Pleasin' You"	-	Old Gold
2001	"Snooker Loopy (Remix)"	-	VVM
2005	"The Sideboard Song (Cow Son Mix)"	-	EMI
2010	"Head to Head (With the Undead)"	-	Screamworks0.
2013	"Rabbit" (RSD Re-Issue)	-	Rockney
2013	"Two Worlds Collide"	-	Warner Bros.
2016	"One Fing 'n' Anuvver"	-	Live Here Now
2018	"A Little Bit of Me"	-	Rockney

== Participations ==
- 1982 : Billy King – Wake Up Little Suzie (Single, Minstrel)
- 1983 : Eric Clapton - Odds and Sods (Album, Beano)
- 1983 : Clarence 'Frogman' Henry – That Old Piano (Single, Rockney)
- 1986 : The TV Hits Album Two - Crackerjack (Album, Towerbell Records)
- 2010 : Jools Holland & His Rhythm & Blues Orchestra – Rockinghorse (Album, Rhino Records)
