= Flying (Chas & Dave song) =

Song by Chas & Dave

Single by Chas & Dave

from the album Job Lot, Flying, The World of Chas & Dave
- Released: 1982/1987/1998
- Genre: Pop, Rock
- Label: Bunce Records
- Songwriters: Chas Hodges; Dave Peacock
- Producers: Chas Hodges; Dave Peacock

Flying is a song by Chas & Dave. It originally appeared on their 1982 album Job Lot as an instrumental, however in 1987 it was re-recorded with vocals and added to their 1987 album Flying, lending its name to it in the process. When the vocal version was released in the UK, it made #88.

In 1998, US radio stations began playing the vocal version of "Flying" in heavy rotation, resulting in considerable public response. To cash in, The World of Chas & Dave was released.
