= The Sideboard Song =

1979 single by Chas & Dave

Single by Chas & Dave

from the album Don't Give a Monkey's
- Released: 26 August 1979
- Genre: Folk · Cockney
- Length: 2:45
- Label: EMI
- Songwriter(s): Chas Hodges; Dave Peacock

Chas & Dave singles chronology
"Gertcha" (1979)	"The Sideboard Song" (1979)	"Rabbit" (1980)

Official audio
- "The Sideboard Song" on YouTube

"The Sideboard Song" is a song by Chas & Dave from their album Don't Give a Monkey's, which was released as a single on 26 August 1979 and entered the UK Singles Chart at No. 66. The song stayed in the charts for three weeks and peaked at number No. 55 on 15 September 1979.

== Background ==
The song was written in the summer of 1978 in a cottage Chas & Dave rented in Ashington, West Sussex, where they also wrote a few other songs, including "Rabbit". According to Hodges, Peacock had first written the line "Skinny little belly now it's sticking out the front". After trying to find lines to rhyme with "front" but rejected those attempts as unusable, Hodges added "I don't care, I don't care, got my beer in the sideboard here", after which they quickly wrote the whole song and recorded a demo that night.

== See also ==
- Chas & Dave discography
