= Stars Over 45 =

1981 single by Chas & Dave

Single by Chas & Dave
- Released: 6 December 1981
- Genre: Novelty
- Length: 4:24
- Label: Rockney
- Songwriters: Chas Hodges; Dave Peacock

Chas & Dave singles chronology
"Rabbit" (1980)	"Stars Over 45" (1981)	"Ain't No Pleasing You" (1982)

Music video
- "Stars Over 45" on YouTube

"Stars Over 45" is a song by Chas & Dave which was released as a single on 6 December 1981 and entered the UK Singles Chart at No. 59. The song stayed in the charts for 8 weeks and peaked at number No. 21 on 2 January 1982.

According to Chas Hodges, the song was recorded as a "piss take" on the series of pop song medleys by Stars on 45, and chose some of the "corniest" old songs such as "When I'm Cleaning Windows", "Any Old Iron" and "The Laughing Policeman" in the medley. It was however not originally intended to be a single, only as a B-side. Hodges did not want it released as a single, and it would be their only song he regretted releasing.

== See also ==
- Chas & Dave discography
