= London Girls =

Single by Chas & Dave

Single by Chas & Dave

from the album Job Lot
- Released: 13 February 1983
- Genre: Rockney, novelty
- Length: 3:42
- Label: Rockney
- Songwriters: Chas Hodges; Dave Peacock

Chas & Dave singles chronology
"Margate" (1982)	"London Girls" (1983)	"My Melancholy Baby" (1983)

"London Girls" is a song by the English pop rock duo Chas & Dave from the album Job Lot, which was released as a single on 13 February 1983 and entered the UK singles chart at number 99. The song stayed in the charts for 9 weeks and peaked at number 63 on 26 March 1983.

== Composition ==
The song was written in 1980 in a writing session with Dave Peacock in a cottage in Ashton, East Northamptonshire.

== Covers ==
Tori Amos recorded a cover of "London Girls" in 1996 during the Boys for Pele album sessions; it was released as a b-side on her maxi single for "Caught a Lite Sneeze" together with another Chas & Dave song, "Thats What I Like Mick (The Sandwich Song)" in the United Kingdom. It was released with "Talula" in the United States.

The Belgian group De Strangers released a Flemish version titled "'n Antwârpse Griet" (An Antwerp Girl), which reached No. 36 on the Belgian chart.

== See also ==
- Chas & Dave discography
