= Snooker Loopy =

1986 single by Chas & Dave

Single by Chas & Dave, The Matchroom Mob
- B-side: "Wallop (Snookered)"
- Released: May 1986
- Genre: Novelty
- Length: 3:49
- Label: Rockney
- Songwriters: Chas Hodges; Dave Peacock
- Producers: Chas Hodges; Dave Peacock

"Snooker Loopy" is a novelty song written by Chas & Dave and performed by them alongside professional snooker players Steve Davis, Dennis Taylor, Willie Thorne, Terry Griffiths, and Tony Meo, billed as the Matchroom Mob. Matchroom Sport, owned by Barry Hearn, was the company that at the time managed all the snooker players involved.. It was released as a single in May 1986 and reached No. 6 on the UK Singles Chart.

The lyric is a mild roast of the styles and antics of the players involved: "old Willie Thorne, his hair's all gawn", for example. The verse on Steve Davis also makes light of the 1985 World Snooker Championship final and his missed black in the final frame, and notes his manager is not concerned who should win the upcoming 1986 Championship, "because he's got the rest of us signed up!" Somewhat ironically, the player who won the 1986 World Snooker Championship – Joe Johnson – was not involved, having been a 150–1 outsider before the tournament. Johnson did, however, go on to release a cover of "Everlasting Love" later that year.

Upon reaching the top 10, Chas & Dave performed the song on Top of the Pops.

== The Romford Rap ==
"The Romford Rap"

Single by Chas & Dave, The Matchroom Mob
- B-side: "The Crackerjack! Theme Song"
- Released: April 1987
- Genre: Novelty
- Length: 2:50
- Label: Rainbow Records
- Songwriters: Chas Hodges; Dave Peacock
- Producers: Chas Hodges; Dave Peacock

A follow-up snooker song, The Romford Rap, was released in 1987. This time, 'The Matchroom Mob' was made up of Steve Davis, Willie Thorne, Jimmy White, Neal Foulds, Dennis Taylor, Tony Meo and Terry Griffiths. It was far less successful, only reaching No. 91 on the UK chart.

== Cultural impact ==
Chas & Dave performed "Snooker Loopy" at their live shows with the original lyrics during the subsequent part of their career, even after all the players mentioned had retired from the professional game; this included a performance at Glastonbury Festival in 2007, and a performance by Chas' band alongside Willie Thorne and Dennis Taylor in 2014.

The song was mentioned to Ronnie O'Sullivan during an episode of A League of Their Own in 2012, leading to Freddie Flintoff singing the chorus, with the audience joining in at the end.

A rival single was released in the same year by snooker players Tony Knowles, Alex Higgins, Kirk Stevens and Jimmy White; it was a cover of "The Wanderer", released under the name Four Away.

A Dutch cover of the song was released in 1986. In 2001, the song was covered by V/Vm and released on vinyl. It was pressed in all snooker ball colours (white, red, yellow, green, brown, blue, pink, black), in editions of 147 hand-numbered copies.

In January 2023, comedian Tom Mayhew and YouTuber Joe Hannard launched The Snooker Loopy Podcast, which takes its name from the song. The podcast features a regular section, Cue the Music, where Joe and Tom review music either related to snooker, or recorded by snooker players. This has included numerous different recordings of the song itself, including solo versions by Dennis Taylor, John Virgo, and listeners of the podcast.

== See also ==
- Chas & Dave discography
