= Ain't No Pleasing You =

1982 single by Chas & Dave

Single by Chas & Dave

from the album Mustn't Grumble
- B-side: "Give It Some Stick Mick"
- Released: 5 March 1982
- Genre: Rockney
- Length: 4:14
- Label: Rockney
- Songwriters: Chas Hodges; Dave Peacock

Chas & Dave singles chronology
"Stars Over 45" (1981)	"Ain't No Pleasing You" (1982)	"Margate" (1982)

Music video
- "Ain't No Pleasing You" on YouTube

"Ain't No Pleasing You" is a song by Chas & Dave from the album Mustn't Grumble, which was released as a single on 5 March 1982 and entered the UK Singles Chart at No. 62. The song stayed in the charts for 11 weeks, peaking at No. 2 on 17 April 1982. It was also the duo's first and biggest hit in Ireland, peaking at No. 3 on the Irish Singles Chart in April 1982.

Interviewed by The Daily Telegraph in 2015, Chas Hodges was asked which was the band's biggest earning hit, and said: "It's difficult to say. "Ain't No Pleasing You" reached number two and is the most played. It was also the biggest achievement because I wrote it. For some hits, like "Rabbit", we wrote together but this one was on my own, although I made sure Dave was happy with it every step of the way."

== Composition ==
According to Chas Hodges, the inspiration for the song came from his brother's account of his wife criticising his work putting up a curtain, to which he replied: "There ain't no fucking pleasing you, is there?" Hodges initially had the idea of writing a song about a man who found that his wife had gone when he returned home, but that changed into a song about a man who wanted to leave after realising that his wife never cared for him, and said: "Oh Darlin' there ain't no pleasin' you."

The idea of the tune for the song came in a writing session in 1980 with Dave Peacock in a cottage in Ashton, East Northamptonshire. Hodges said that a ballad-style tune suddenly came into his head while they were writing "London Girls", and they quickly put the tune down onto a cassette before resuming their songwriting. A few weeks later when they were making the album Mustn't Grumble, they found that they needed an extra song, so they decided to use the tune they had recorded on cassette to write "Ain't No Pleasing You". Hodges wrote the song largely by himself, although Peacock was consulted in every step of the writing process to ensure that he was happy with the song.

The idea for the rhythm of the song came after Hodges heard John Lennon's "Starting Over", although he would describe it to Peacock only as a Fats Domino-style tempo.

== Recording ==
The song, as with many of Chas & Dave's songs, was recorded at the Portland Studios. After recording, they made a rough mix on a 15 ips tape, later a more careful mix was made. However, they preferred the rough mix which had an editing error that resulted in an unusual number of beats, and that version was used.

Chas & Dave were interested in releasing the song as a single, but the record company did not think it would be a hit, choosing to release other songs instead. The duo then performed the song on a television show and it was met with a good response, prompting the record company to release the song as a single. Just before releasing it, a string arrangement by Hodges was recorded with 8 violins and 2 cellos, which was then overdubbed onto the rough mix.

== Cover versions ==
In 1984, Danish group Bamses Venner recorded a Danish version titled "Det Blæser Vi På" ("We Blow on It"; Danish expression for "We don't care"), while in 2015 Austrian singer Hansi Hinterseer recorded a German version, "Oh Darling, dir macht keiner was Recht" ("Oh darling, no one is right about you").

== Chart history ==
=== Weekly charts ===
Chart (1982–83)	Peak position
Australia (Kent Music Report)	11
Belgium (Ultratop 50 Flanders)	9
Ireland (IRMA)	3
Netherlands (Single Top 100)	15
New Zealand (Recorded Music NZ)	3
UK Singles (Official Charts)	2

=== Year-end charts ===
Chart (1982)	Rank
Australia (Kent Music Report)	63
New Zealand	20
UK	36

== See also ==
- Chas & Dave discography
