= Margate (song) =

1982 single by Chas & Dave

Single by Chas & Dave

from the album Job Lot
- Released: 11 July 1982
- Genre: Rockney, Novelty
- Length: 2:23
- Label: Rockney
- Songwriter(s): Chas Hodges; Dave Peacock

Chas & Dave singles chronology
"Ain't No Pleasing You" (1982)	"Margate" (1982)	"London Girls" (1983)

Music video
- "Margate" on YouTube

"Margate" is a song from the album Job Lot by Chas & Dave. It was released as a single on 11 July 1982 and entered the UK Singles Chart at number 67. The song stayed in the charts for 4 weeks and peaked at number 46 on 24 July 1982.

== Composition ==
As depicted in the accompanying video, the song is about a coach trip to the traditional seaside attractions of Margate in Kent. Unusually, the verse and chorus are in different keys (D major and G major respectively).

The song was used in a series of adverts for Courage Best Bitter, however, unlike other Chas & Dave songs also used for other Courage adverts, the song was written specifically for the advert first. The advertising agency requested that Chas & Dave write a song for their adverts using the tune from the chorus of their song "Massage Parlour", but with lyrics about a trip to Margate. The advert proved popular, and Chas & Dave then wrote the full lyrics for the song, recorded and released it as a single.

== B-side ==
In a contrasting style the B-side Give it Gavotte is an instrumental, based on the Gavotte folk dance style from France.

== In other media ==
The song appears in the 1989 Only Fools & Horses episode "The Jolly Boys' Outing" (about a day trip to Margate) with minor lyric changes from the single version and the voices of David Jason and Nicholas Lyndhurst added. This version was released on Vinyl in 2019 to mark Record Store Day, and the 30th Anniversary of the episode airing.

== Charts ==
Chart (1982)	Peak position
UK Singles (OCC)	46

== See also ==
- Chas & Dave discography
