= Mick Burt =

British drummer (1938–2014)

- Born: 23 August 1938
- Died: 18 October 2014 (aged 76)
- Instrument: Drums
- Years active: 1960–2009
- Formerly of: Cliff Bennett and the Rebel Rousers, Chas & Dave

Mick Burt (23 August 1938 – 18 October 2014) was a British drummer. He is best known for being the drummer for Chas & Dave from 1975 to 2009.

== Life and career ==
Burt was the drummer for Cliff Bennett and the Rebel Rousers throughout most of the 1960s, during which he met Chas Hodges, who was the band's bassist at one point. In 1968, he toured with Jerry Lee Lewis. After briefly being in the band Black Claw with Hodges and Dave Peacock, Burt took up a job as a plumber. In 1975, Burt joined Chas & Dave as their drummer. Although Burt played both in the studio and live and backed the duo on television, Hodges and Peacock remained the main image of the band. He supported Eric Clapton in 1980.

Burt was diagnosed with Parkinson's disease in the 1990s and Dementia soon after. He eventually retired from touring with Chas & Dave in 2009, and his role was taken over by Hodges' son, Nicholas, who was influenced by Burt as a child and took up drumming. He died from complications of the two diseases on 18 October 2014 aged 76. His wife died two years later. In 2018, Burt's son, Tony, held a series of gigs around the UK to raise money for Parkinson's UK and Dementia UK.
