= Strummin' =

1978 single by Chas & Dave

Single by Chas & Dave

from the album Rockney
- B-side: "I'm in Trouble"
- Released: 5 November 1978
- Genre: Folk
- Length: 4:00
- Label: EMI
- Songwriters: Chas Hodges; Dave Peacock
- Producer: Tony Ashton

Chas & Dave singles chronology
"Strummin'" (1978)	"Gertcha" (1979)

"Strummin'" is a song by Chas & Dave from the album Rockney, which was released as a single on 5 November 1978 and entered the UK Singles Chart at number 74. The song stayed in the charts for 3 weeks and peaked at number 52 on 25 November 1979.

== Background ==
The song is a track from the second album by Chas & Dave, which was recorded at Roundhouse Studios on Chalk Farm Road, London in 1977.

According to Chas Hodges, Simon Bates of BBC Radio 1 played the track "Strummin'" from the album and said that he would make the song record of the week if Chas & Dave had released it a single, and so it was released as a single. The song would become their first song by Chas & Dave to reach the chart at number 52.

== See also ==
- Chas & Dave discography
