= Spurs Against the Nazis =

British anti-Nazi campaign

Spurs Against the Nazis was a campaign and association created in the late 1970s by fans of Tottenham Hotspur aligned with the Anti-Nazi League. They are credited with having banned racism at White Hart Lane.

It was the first Football Fans Against the Nazis group, and they were aligned with the Anti-Nazi League, Rock Against Racism, and many other initiatives against the rise of the National Front and the skinheads in Britain in the late 1970s.

Other Football Fans Against the Nazis were created by supporters of Sheffield Wednesday, Leyton Orient, West Bromwich Albion, Swansea, Oxford, Barnsley, Coventry, Everton, Norwich and Arsenal.

== History ==
The first Spurs Against the Nazis meeting was attended by 60 people, and they received support by The Hornsey Journal. Black and foreign players such as Garth Crooks and Chris Hughton, or Osvaldo Ardiles and Ricardo Villa were celebrated, and they organised amateur football matches with up to 44 teams, and celebrities such as Peter Cook and Bill Oddie as referees.

In 1979, the club threatened to sue the group because of their use of the club's crest, logo and name. Their equivalent in Leyton, Orient against the Nazis, were banned by their own club after clashes against West Ham supporters aligned with the British Movement.
