= Cliff Bennett and the Rebel Rousers =

British R&B/soul/beat group (1957–1970)

- Also known as: Cliff Bennett & His Band
- Origin: Slough, Berkshire, England
- Genres: Rhythm and blues; beat music; soul
- Years active: 1957–1970
- Label: Parlophone
- Past members: Cliff Bennett; Moss Groves; Roy Young; Bobby Thompson; Frank Allen; Chas Hodges; Ben Jordan; Robin Shaw; Rocky Winters; Dave Edmunds; George Mattingley; Mick Burt; Nicky Hopkins; Dave Wendels; Mick Currell; Bernie Watson; Mick King; Robin Box; Sid Phillips; John Golden; Rahsar Nesskrag; Lars Lundquist; Dave Forristal; Darren Bazzoni

Cliff Bennett and the Rebel Rousers were a 1960s British rhythm and blues, soul and beat group who had two top 10 hits with "One Way Love" (No. 9 UK, 1964) and "Got to Get You into My Life" (No. 6 UK, 1966).

Members include Bennett himself (vocals, born Clifford Bennett, 4 June 1940, Slough, Berkshire, England) Chas Hodges (keyboards, bass), Mick Burt (drums), Nicky Hopkins (piano) and Moss Groves (tenor saxophone).

== Rhythm and blues boom ==
Bennett formed the band in 1957. They recorded several singles with record producer Joe Meek that were released by Parlophone. Bennett continued recording for Parlophone, issuing cover versions of "You've Really Got a Hold on Me" and "Got My Mojo Working".

Brian Epstein became their manager in September 1964. Their seventh release, "One Way Love" (written by Bert Berns and Jerry Ragovoy under their pseudonyms Bert Russell and Norman Meade) b/w "Slow Down", reached No. 9 on the UK Singles Chart. Their next, "I'll Take You Home" (written by Barry Mann and Cynthia Weil) b/w "Do You Love Him", charted at No. 42. "Three Rooms with Running Water" (written by Jimmy Radcliffe and Bob Halley) did not chart. In early 1966, the band was the opening act for the Beatles on their final European tour. Bennett got the opportunity to hear the Paul McCartney song "Got to Get You into My Life", which was used on the Revolver album, but was never released as a single. Bennett recorded it, with his own composition "Baby Each Day" appearing on the B-side. McCartney produced the session. The record reached No. 6 on the UK singles chart, becoming Bennett's biggest ever hit. Bennett returned to the songbook of Lennon–McCartney in 1968 when he recorded "Back in the USSR" as Cliff Bennett and his Band. Released as a single on Parlophone, it failed to make any impression on the chart.

Also in 1968, Cliff Bennett left the Rebel Rousers and Harvey Hinsley joined the band, which by then included Hodges, Burt, John Golden, Moss Groves and Roy Young. They played gigs in the UK, Germany, Austria, Italy, Beirut and the Bahamas. This incarnation of the band also recorded a single, "Should I", which did not chart. At the end of August 1969, Young left to form his own band. Hodges, Hinsley, Burt and Dave Peacock formed Black Claw, which played club engagements until Hodges left to join Heads, Hands & Feet in early 1970. Hinsley joined Hot Chocolate in late summer 1970.

== Afterwards ==
Bennett went on to be part of Toe Fat, whilst Chas Hodges (keyboards) and Mick Burt became Chas & Dave with Dave Peacock. After Toe Fat disbanded, two of their members (Ken Hensley and Lee Kerslake) joined Uriah Heep. Bennett was asked to join them but declined. He was also considered for the lead vocalist position in Blood, Sweat & Tears when David Clayton-Thomas left in the early 1970s, but once again turned the position down.

Bennett released a solo album, Rebellion, in 1971 but he was unable to rekindle his success of the previous decade. Between 1975 and 1976, he was the vocalist for a band called Shanghai, which released two albums. Other members included Mick Green (guitar), Chuck Bedford (vocals, harmonica, 1974–75), Pete Kircher (drums, vocals), Mike Le Main (bass, keyboards, 1974–75), Brian Alterman (guitar, 1975–76) and Pat King (bass, 1975–76). In the late 1970s, Bennett retired from the music industry to go into shipping, but returned to music in the 2000s, issuing the album Loud And Clear in 2002, followed by Nearly Retired in 2009.

In 1988, English guitarist Mark Lundquist reformed the Rebel Rousers. He functioned as both band leader and manager until 1996. More recently, Lundquist has toured alongside Mike d'Abo, Chris Farlowe, Zoot Money, Maggie Bell, Screaming Lord Sutch, the Manfreds, Steve Ellis and New Amen Corner.

== Members ==
- Moss Groves – tenor saxophone (born Maurice Groves, 3 April 1940, Birmingham Died 13 December 2022)
- Roy Young – piano, organ, vocals (born Roy Frederick Young, 20 October 1934, Poplar, East London, England died 27 April 2018, Oxford)
- Bobby Thomson – bass (born Robert Thomson, 1942, Liverpool, Lancashire, England)
- Frank Allen – bass (born Francis Renauld McNiece, 14 December 1943, Hayes, Middlesex, England)
- Chas Hodges – Keyboards (born Charles Nicholas Hodges, 28 December 1943, Edmonton, North London, England died 22 September 2018)
- Ben Jordan – bass (born Benjamin Jordan, in 1941, Edmonton, North London, England)
- Robin Shaw - bass (born Robin George Scrimshaw; 6 October 1943, Hayes, Middlesex, England)
- Ricky Winters – drums (born Richard Winters, 27 September 1940, Aldershot, Hampshire, England)
- Dave Edmunds – percussion
- George Mattingley – Rhythm guitar, early years 1957–1960. Lives in Castle Donington, North Leicestershire.
- Dave Wendels – lead guitar (born David Wendels, 5 July 1942, Hounslow, Middlesex, England)
- Mick Currell – rhythm guitar (born Michael Currell, 1940)
- Bernie Watson – lead guitar (born Bernard Watson, 1944)
- Mick King – lead guitar (born Michael Borer, 1942, Croydon, Surrey died 26 November 2010)
- Robin Box - lead guitar (born 19 June 1944)
- Sid Phillips – tenor saxophone (born Bernard Phillips, 1 November 1939, Tottenham, North London died 18 December 2015)
- John Golden – trumpet
- Rahsar Nesskrag – triangle
- Mick Burt – Drums – (Born Michael William Burt on 23 August 1938, Redhill, Surrey, England, Died 18 October 2014)
- Lars Lundquist – lead guitar – (Born Mark Lundquist on 27 July 1954, London, England).
- Dave Forristal – Piano and Hammond – (Born Dave Forristal 14 Feb 1973, Fakenham, Norfolk) 2018–2022
- Darren Bazzoni - Drums - (Born 20 Dec 1968, England) .

== Discography ==
=== Albums ===
As Cliff Bennett & the Rebel Rousers

- 1965: Cliff Bennett & the Rebel Rousers
- 1966: Drivin' You Wild
- 1967: Got to Get You into Our Life

Note: On bootleg recordings of the Beatles performing at the Star Club in Hamburg, Germany, a performance of "Hully Gully" (recorded the same night as a Beatles set) is often mistakenly included as a Beatles performance.

As Cliff Bennett & His Band

- 1968: Cliff Bennett Branches Out

=== EPs ===
- 1964 "She Said Yeah"/"Doctor Feelgood"/"You Make Me Happy"/"Stupidity", GEP 8923
- 1965: Try It Baby – "I'm Crazy 'Bout My Baby"/"Shoes"/"Try It Baby"/"Do It Right", Parlophone GEP 8936
- 1966: We're Gonna Make It – "My Sweet Woman"/"Whole Lotta Woman"/"We're Gonna Make It"/"Waiting at the Station", Parlophone GEP 8955

=== Singles ===
- July 1961: "You've Got What I Like" / "I'm in Love with You", Parlophone R 4793
- October 1961: "That's What I Said" / "When I Get Paid", Parlophone R 4836
- March 1962: "Poor Joe" / "Hurtin' Inside", Parlophone R 4895
- July 1963: "Everybody Loves a Lover" / "My Old Stand By", Parlophone R 5046
- November 1963: "You Really Got a Hold on Me" / "Alright", Parlophone
- March 1964: "Got My Mojo Working" / "Beautiful Dreamer", Parlophone R 5119
- September 1964: "One Way Love" / "Slow Down", Parlophone R 5173 - UK No. 9
- January 1965: "I'll Take You Home" / "Do You Love Him?", Parlophone R 5229 - UK No. 42
- April 1965: "Three Rooms with Running Water" / "If Only You'd Reply", Parlophone R 5259
- August 1965: "I Have Cried My Last Tear" / "As Long as She Looks Like You", Parlophone R 5317
- February 1966: "You Can't Love 'Em All" / "Need Your Loving Tonight", Parlophone R 5406
- June 1966: "Eyes for You" / "Hold On I'm Coming", Parlophone R 5466
- August 1966: "Got to Get You into My Life" / "Baby Each Day", Parlophone R 5489 - UK No. 6
- November 1966: "Never Knew Lovin' Could Be So Doggone Good" / "Don't Help Me Out", Parlophone R 5534
- February 1967: "I'll Take Good Care of You" / "I'm Sorry", Parlophone R 5565
- May 1967: "I'll Be There" / "Use Me"
- August 1967: "Good Times" / "Lonely Weekends", Parlophone R 5711
