= Glory Glory (football chant) =

Terrace chant sung in association football

"Glory Glory" is a terrace chant song in association football in the United Kingdom and in other sports. It uses a popular camp meeting hymn tune of unknown origin that is famously associated with the marching song "John Brown's Body", also The Battle Hymn of the Republic, with the chorus "Glory, Glory, Hallelujah" – the chant replaces "Hallelujah" with the name (or a four-syllable adaptation) of the favoured team. The chant's popularity has caused several clubs to release their version as an official team song.

== History ==
"Glory, Glory to the Hibees"

Single by Hector Nicol with the Kelvin Country Dance Band
- A-side: "Glory, Glory to the Hibees"
- B-side: "The Boys in Maroon"
- Genre: Folk, Football
- Label: Gaelfonn SPB.905
- Songwriter: Trad Arr. Hector Nicol

The University of Georgia in the United States first debuted the song as a "fight song" in 1915. The Scottish club Hibernian may be the first club to release the song as a single; "Glory, Glory to the Hibees" by Hector Nicol is believed to have been recorded in the late 1950s. In English football, Tottenham Hotspur is thought to be the first English club to sing the song as a football chant in 1960 when they prevented Wolves from achieving the double in April 1960, but became a popular chant for the club in 1961. Other notable clubs to adopt the song as a football anthem include Leeds United and Manchester United.

== Tottenham Hotspur ==
"Glory Glory, Tottenham Hotspur"

Single by Chas & Dave
- A-side: "Ossie's Dream"
- B-side: "Glory, Glory, Tottenham Hotspur"
- Released: 1981
- Genre: Pop, Football
- Label: Glory Records, Glory 1
- Songwriters: Chas Hodges; Dave Peacock

"Glory, Glory, Hallelujah" became a popular song among Tottenham Hotspur fans in the early 1960s and is still an anthem for the club today. It is believed that Tottenham fans first sung the song in April 1960, when they prevented Wolverhampton Wanderers from achieving the double. Fans took the song to their European campaign in the 1961–62 European Cup, and it then acquired the status of an anthem for the club after an incident in September 1961. In the away match against Polish side Górnik Zabrze, the Polish press described the Spurs team as "no angels" due to their rough tackling during the match. In the return leg at White Hart Lane, some fans went to the match in angel costumes, holding placards with slogans such as "Glory be to shining White Hart Lane" and "Rejoice! This is the night of vengeance". The crowded started singing the refrain "Glory, Glory, Hallelujah" when Spurs beat the Poles 8–1, and from then on, singing the song became a tradition at Tottenham. The song was subsequently recorded by the members of the 1967 FA Cup-winning team and included in the EP, The Spurs Go Marching On.

For the 1981 FA Cup final, the Tottenham Hotspur squad together with Chas & Dave recorded the song "Glory, Glory, Tottenham Hotspur" and released it as the B side to the single "Ossie's Dream (Spurs Are on Their Way to Wembley)".

== Leeds United ==
"Glory Glory, Leeds United"

Single by Ronnie Hilton and The Leeds United AFC
- A-side: "Glory Glory Leeds United"
- B-side: "We Shall Not Be Moved"
- Released: 1968
- Genre: Singalong, Football
- Length: 2:43
- Label: Columbia DB8506
- Songwriter: Trad Arr. Ronnie Hilton

"Glory Glory Leeds United" was released as a single (Columbia DB8506) by Ronnie Hilton in 1968 to celebrate Leeds United's League Cup and Inter-Cities Fairs Cup successes, which are referenced in the lyrics. The song's lyrics also reference former player, Billy Bremner and Don Revie. The lyrics also mention Mike Summerbee and George Best in the opening. In the absence of any official release by the team, the song became Leeds' unofficial 1970 FA Cup final song.

== Manchester United ==
"Glory Glory Man. United"

Single by Manchester United
- Released: 1983
- Recorded: 1983, At Strawberry Studios, Stockport
- Genre: Pop, Football
- Length: 2:53
- Label: EMI 5390
- Songwriter: Frank Renshaw
- Producer: Peter Tattersall

Manchester United singles chronology
"Manchester United" (1976)	"Glory Glory Man. United" (1983)	"We All Follow Man United" (1985)

"Glory Glory Man. United" was a single released by the Manchester United squad prior to the 1983 FA Cup final. It was written by Frank Renshaw, who was a member of Herman's Hermits in the 1970s and 1980s. It was recorded at Strawberry Studios in Stockport with the football team and some of Renshaw's friends – Renshaw's son Lee also sang on the recording.

Manchester United fans have been singing this song since 1983. In the 1990s, it became popular among opposition supporters to manipulate the words of the song when playing Manchester United to "Who the f are Man United?", which Man United supporters sarcastically sung themselves after scoring, or while winning, against a rival team.

Glory Glory Man United was also the name of the official club poster magazine, launched in 1994 and published every four weeks, totalling 13 issues a year. In 2007 its average reader age was 13 years 2 months.

In 2007, a full-length version of "Glory Glory Man United" was written and recorded by "The World Red Army", and produced by Will Robinson and Michael Graves. It became the official song at Old Trafford, featuring mentions of Wayne Rooney and Cristiano Ronaldo. A follow-up version titled "Glory Glory Man United 2" was released a decade later with some lyrical changes to reflect the then-current United team, namely Marcus Rashford and Romelu Lukaku.

== Glory Glory to South Sydney ==
In Australia, "Glory Glory to South Sydney" is used by the South Sydney Rabbitohs an Australian rugby league club. The song was released in 1967 meaning it pre-dates use by all uk football teams aside from Hibernian who were the original football team to adopt the anthem. It mentions all the teams in the competition when the song was written, and says what Souths did to them when they played. Each verse ends with, "They wear the Red and Green".[16]

== See also ==
- The Battle Hymn of the Republic: Other songs set to this tune
- List of UK hit singles by footballers
