= Oliver Edward Nelson in London with Oily Rags =

Studio album by Oliver Nelson
- Released: 1974
- Recorded: April 1974; London, England with overdubs in New York City
- Genre: Jazz
- Label: Flying Dutchman BDL 1-0592
- Producer: Bob Thiele

Oliver Nelson chronology
Swiss Suite (1971)	Oliver Edward Nelson in London with Oily Rags (1974)	Skull Session (1975)

Oliver Edward Nelson in London with Oily Rags is an album by Oliver Nelson featuring performances recorded in London in 1974 for the Flying Dutchman label. Supporting Nelson was the band Oily Rags, which featured Chas Hodges and Dave Peacock (later of Chas & Dave), who also wrote three of the album's songs.

== Reception ==
Professional ratings
Review scores
Source	Rating
Allmusic	1.5/5 stars

The Allmusic site awarded the album 1½ stars stating "Nelson plays well and there are some good moments (particularly on Jobim's "Meditation") but most of the backup musicians sound quite anonymous and little of significance occurs".

== Track listing ==
1. "Lucille" (Little Richard, Albert Collins) - 6:13
2. "Woggles" (Chas Hodges, Dave Peacock) - 1:56
3. "Cairo to Benghazi" (Joe Jammer) - 10:06
4. "Working Man" (Chas Hodges, Dave Peacock) - 3:49
5. "Meditation" (Antônio Carlos Jobim, Newton Mendonça) - 6:00
6. "Mailman Bring Me No More Blues" (Bob Katz, Ruth Ann Roberts, Bob Thiele) - 4:42
7. "Hillbilly" (Chas Hodges, Dave Peacock) - 3:42

== Personnel ==
- Oliver Nelson - alto saxophone, soprano saxophone
- Jimmy Maxwell, Jimmy Owens, Ernie Royal - trumpet (tracks 2 & 7)
- Mike Moran - piano
- Hugh Burns (tracks 1 & 4–7), Joe Jammer (tracks 1, 3, 6 & 7) - electric guitar
- Chas Hodges (tracks 1, 2, 4, 6 & 7), Dave Peacock (tracks 1, 2 & 7) - guitar
- Pat Donaldson - electric bass
- Pete Gavin - drums
- Chris Karan, Frank Ricotti - percussion (tracks 4 & 5)
