= Gertcha =

Single by Chas & Dave

Single by Chas & Dave

from the album Don't Give a Monkey's
- Released: May 1979
- Studio: Portland Studios
- Genre: Novelty
- Length: 3:50
- Label: EMI
- Songwriter(s): Chas Hodges; Dave Peacock

Chas & Dave singles chronology
"Strummin'" (1978)	"Gertcha" (1979)	"The Sideboard Song" (1979)

Music video
- "Gertcha" on YouTube

"Gertcha" is a song from Chas & Dave's 1979 album Don't Give a Monkey's, which was released as a single in May 1979 and entered the UK Singles Chart at No. 67. The song stayed in the charts for 8 weeks and peaked at number No. 20 on 30 June 1979. The song was used as the music behind a notable television commercial for Courage Bitter.

== Background ==
The song is based around an expletive traditionally said in the East End of London when someone is in disbelief of something, or wants to give a mild threat. According to Chas Hodges, the word is a more polite way of saying "Get out of it you little bastard!" where "get out of it you" becomes contracted to "gertcha". The song was originally titled "Woortcha!" in the first album of Chas & Dave released in 1975, One Fing 'n' Anuvver, but they decided to use "Gertcha" as the title for the single as it was the more commonly used version of the word.

The song was first written in 1972 or 1973. An advertising executive Dave Trott heard the duo performed "Woortcha!" in a pub in the East End in 1978, and decided to use the song for a series of adverts for Courage bitter. The original version in One Fing 'n' Anuvver was slower, and Chas & Dave recorded a short version at a faster tempo so that it may fit into the adverts. The advert was released in early 1979 and became popular, the record label EMI then requested a faster version of the song so that it may be released as a single. The duo re-recorded the song at Portland Studios in London, and the faster version was released as "Gertcha" early May 1979. The song is included in the album Don't Give a Monkey's.

== Performance ==
When Chas & Dave performed the song on Top of the Pops, the BBC producer demanded that they not sing the word "cowson", an old-fashioned swear word meaning "son of a bitch". The duo obliged by omitting the word, leaving a brief pause instead (although they did sing it once, in the first instance at the end of the first verse), but only after multiple takes as they kept forgetting not to sing it.

== See also ==
- Chas & Dave discography
