= Tottenham, Tottenham =

Single by Chas & Dave, Tottenham Hotspur 1982 FA Cup Final squad
- B-side: "Spurs Medley"
- Released: April 1982
- Genre: Singalong, Football
- Label: Towerbell SHELF2
- Songwriter(s): Chas Hodges, Dave Peacock
- Producer(s): Chas Hodges, Dave Peacock

"Tottenham, Tottenham" was a single released by the English football team Tottenham Hotspur, with uncredited accompaniment by Chas & Dave, in 1982. It reached number 19 in the UK Singles Chart.

== Background ==
The song was written by Chas Hodges and Dave Peacock of Chas & Dave. According to Hodges, he was inspired by Chubby Checker's "Let's Twist Again" for the theme of the song. The lyrics "We're gonna do it like we did last year" came from "Yeah, let's twist again, like we did last year", as Tottenham won the FA Cup the previous year. The song was the second Cup Final song for Spurs written by Chas & Dave. It was performed by the Tottenham Hotspur 1982 FA Cup Final squad, with uncredited vocals and instrumental accompaniment by Chas & Dave.

The song was released in April 1982 to celebrate the team reaching the 1982 FA Cup Final, which Tottenham won in the replay. It first entered the British singles chart at No. 43 and peaked at No. 19 the week before the final.
