= Oliver Nelson =

American composer and bandleader (1932–1975)

Background information
- Born: Oliver Edward Nelson; June 4, 1932; St. Louis, Missouri, U.S.
- Died: October 28, 1975 (aged 43) Los Angeles, California, U.S.
- Genres: Bebop, hard bop, post-bop, jazz fusion
- Occupations: Musician, composer, arranger
- Instruments: Soprano saxophone, alto saxophone, tenor saxophone, and clarinet
- Labels: Verve; Impulse!; Prestige; Argo; Flying Dutchman

Oliver Edward Nelson (June 4, 1932 – October 28, 1975) was an American jazz saxophonist, clarinetist, arranger, composer, and bandleader. His 1961 Impulse! album The Blues and the Abstract Truth (1961) is regarded as one of the most significant recordings of its era. The centerpiece of the album is the definitive version of Nelson's composition, "Stolen Moments". Other important recordings from the 1960s are the albums More Blues and the Abstract Truth (1964) and Sound Pieces (1966), both also on Impulse!.

== Biography ==
=== Early life and career ===
Oliver Nelson was born into a musical family in St. Louis. His brother was a saxophonist who played with Cootie Williams in the 1940s, and his sister sang and played piano. Nelson began learning to play the piano when he was six and started on the saxophone at the age of 11. Beginning in 1947, he played in "territory" bands in and around Saint Louis, before joining the Louis Jordan band, where he stayed from 1950 to 1951, playing alto saxophone and arranging charts for Jordan's band.

In 1952, Nelson served in the United States Marines Corps playing woodwinds in the 3rd Marine Division band in Japan and Korea. It was in Japan that Nelson attended a concert by the Tokyo Philharmonic Orchestra and heard Maurice Ravel's Ma mère l'Oye and Paul Hindemith's Symphony in E Flat. Nelson later recalled that this "'was the first time that I had heard really modern music for back in St. Louis I hadn't even known that Negroes were allowed to go to concerts. I realized everything didn't have to sound like Beethoven or Brahms ... . It was then that I decided to become a composer.'"

Nelson returned to Missouri to study music composition and theory at Washington University in St. Louis and Lincoln University, graduating with a master's degree in 1958. He also studied with composers Elliott Carter, Robert Wykes and George Tremblay.

While back in his hometown of St. Louis, Nelson met and married Eileen Mitchell; the couple had a son, Oliver Nelson Jr., but soon divorced. After graduation, Nelson married St. Louis native Audrey McEwen, a union that lasted until his death and produced a son, Nyles.

After completing his degree Nelson moved to New York City, playing with Erskine Hawkins and Wild Bill Davis, and working as the house arranger for the Apollo Theater in Harlem. He also played on the West Coast briefly with the Louie Bellson big band in 1959, and in the same year began recording for Prestige Records as the leader of various small groups. From 1960 to 1961, he briefly played with Count Basie and Duke Ellington, and then joined the Quincy Jones big band playing tenor saxophone, both in the U.S. and on tour in Europe.

=== Breakthrough and afterwards ===
After six albums as leader between 1959 and 1961 for the Prestige Records label, Nelson's big breakthrough came with The Blues and the Abstract Truth, an album recorded for Impulse! also featuring Eric Dolphy, Roy Haynes, Bill Evans, and Freddie Hubbard, which made his name as a composer and arranger. Subsequently, he recorded a number of notable big-band albums including Afro-American Sketches and Full Nelson.

Nelson worked as an arranger on large ensemble albums for Thelonious Monk, Cannonball Adderley, Sonny Rollins, Eddie "Lockjaw" Davis, Johnny Hodges, Wes Montgomery, Buddy Rich, Jimmy Smith, Billy Taylor, Stanley Turrentine, Irene Reid, and Gene Ammons. The music Sonny Rollins wrote for Alfie (1966), a film made in Great Britain, was arranged by Nelson for Alfie of the same name. He also led all-star big bands in various live performances between 1966 and 1975. Nelson continued to perform as a soloist during this period, now focusing primarily on soprano saxophone.

In 1967, Nelson moved to Los Angeles to be near the television and movie industry and began composing background music for television and films, for which he became highly sought after. Television projects included Ironside, Night Gallery, Columbo, Chase, The Six Million Dollar Man and Longstreet. Films scored by Nelson include Death of a Gunfighter (1969), Skullduggery (1970), Dial Hot Line (1970), Zig Zag (1970) and The Alpha Caper (1973). He also arranged Gato Barbieri's music for Last Tango in Paris (1972). Two years later, he recorded a further album in Britain for Flying Dutchman Records, Oliver Edward Nelson in London with Oily Rags, that featured contributions from Chas Hodges and Dave Peacock, better known as cockney music hall duo Chas & Dave. During this productive time he also arranged and produced albums for pop stars such as Nancy Wilson, James Brown, The Temptations, and Diana Ross.

Along with his big-band appearances (in Berlin, Montreux, New York, and Los Angeles), he led a small group that included John Klemmer, Ernie Watts, Freddie Hill, and Frank Strozier in a United States Department of State-sponsored tour of West Africa in 1969. Less well-known is the fact that Nelson composed several symphonic works, and was also deeply involved in jazz education, returning to his alma mater, Washington University, in the summer of 1969 to lead a five-week-long clinic that also featured such guest performers as Phil Woods, Mel Lewis, Thad Jones, Sir Roland Hanna, and Ron Carter. Among the student participants at the Washington University Summer Jazz Institute were saxophonists Julius Hemphill, Oliver Lake, and Hamiet Bluiett, who later co-founded the World Saxophone Quartet with David Murray. Nelson's book of jazz practice exercises, Patterns for Improvisation, was published in 1966 and remains highly regarded to this day.

Nelson died of a heart attack on October 28, 1975, at the age of 43. It is widely believed that Nelson's commitment to his work resulted in lengthy periods of stress which contributed to his premature death.
