= Heads Hands & Feet =

British rock and country rock group

- Origin: UK
- Genres: Country rock
- Years active: 1969–1973
- Label: Capitol
- Spinoff of: Poet and the One-Man Band
- Past members: Tony Colton; Ray Smith; Mike O'Neill; Albert Lee; Chas Hodges; Pete Gavin

Heads Hands & Feet was a British rock and country rock band. It was formed in 1969 after the breakup of Poet and the One Man Band, which included some of the same members (see Members below).

== Music and performances ==
Heads Hands & Feet recorded their debut album, Home From Home, in 1970. Initially shelved by their label, it was finally released in 1995.

In 1971, their proper debut release, Heads, Hands & Feet, was released as a single-disc record in Europe on Island Records, and as a double album in the United States on the Capitol Records label.

While still relatively unknown, they served as the supporting act for Deep Purple's series of concerts from 5 to 8 March 1971 in Glasgow, Edinburgh, Dundee, and Aberdeen, Scotland. They were the opening act at a free concert in London's Hyde Park on 3 July 1971, which also featured Humble Pie and Grand Funk Railroad.

In 1972, the band toured the United States. Their second album, Tracks, received some critical acclaim. But internal tensions in the band resulted in a break-up in December 1972, before the group's third release, Old Soldiers Never Die, in 1973.

== Other activities ==
Ray Smith and Tony Colton teamed with producer and composer Johnny Harris on several efforts, including co-writing and co-producing for Richard Harris and Shirley Bassey, as well as writing and performing the soundtrack for the 1970 BBC documentary, The World of Georgie Best. In 1970, members of the group performed at the Royal Albert Hall with the Johnny Harris Orchestra for his 'Movements' concert, opening for Dionne Warwick.

Members of Heads Hands & Feet also provided the core backing for:

- Shirley Bassey's album Something (1970)
- Richard Harris's single "A Ballad of a Man Called Horse" (1970)
- a still-unissued Carl Wayne album (1970)
- Jerry Lee Lewis's 1973 album The Session, recorded in London from 7 to 11 January
- Don Everly's Sunset Towers album (1974)
- Teresa Brewer's rock version of Music! Music! Music! (recorded as Teresa Brewer in London with Oily Rags) (1973)

== Members ==
- Tony Colton (born Anthony George Chalk, 11 February 1942, Tunbridge Wells, Kent; died 24 August 2020) – lead vocals, percussion, keyboards
- Pete Gavin (born Peter Leslie Rowney, 8 September 1946, Lewisham, South East London) – drums
- Chas Hodges (born Charles Nicholas Hodges, 28 December 1943, Edmonton, North London; died 22 September 2018) – bass, backing and lead vocals, guitar, violin
- Albert Lee (born Albert William Lee, 21 December 1943, Willey, Herefordshire) – lead guitar, backing and lead vocals, keyboards
- Mike O'Neill (born Michael O'Neill, 8 July 1938, Lowton, Lancashire; died 10 October 2013, Stevenage, Hertfordshire) – keyboards (1970–1971)
- Ray Smith (born Raymond Barry Smith, 7 September 1943, London; died 6 June 2022) – rhythm guitar, backing and lead vocals, bass

Colton, Smith and O'Neill were previously members of the band Poet and the One Man Band.

== Discography ==
=== Studio albums ===
List of albums, with selected chart positions
Title	Album details	Peak chart positions
Title	Album details	AUS
Heads Hands & Feet	Released: 1971; Format: LP; Label: Capitol Records	36
Tracks	Released: 1972; Format: LP; Label: Capitol Records	–
Old Soldiers Never Die	Released: 1973; Format: LP; Label: Atlantic	56
