= Mick Greenwood =

Mick Greenwood is an English-born, American-raised singer/songwriter and producer.

Greenwood was discovered at New York's The Bitter End by the legendary John Hammond of Columbia Records. Signed to MCA Records worldwide in 1971, his debut album Living Game was recorded at Sound Techniques and CBS Studios in London, and received great acclaim. Mick and his band toured the US in the 1970s, The 1972 tour band included Jerry Donahue, Barry de Souza, Tony Cox and Dave Peacock, who returned to the UK.

Mick went on to make his second album for MCA Records To Friends, followed by a third for Warner Bros. Records entitled Midnight Dreamer which he produced with his engineer Vic Gamm. With bass player Pat Donaldson, drummers Gerry Conway, Barry de Souza and William Murray, and arrangements by Richard Anthony Hewson and Steve Hamilton, Mick performed all lead vocals, guitars and keyboards.

Greenwood released a fourth album in 2021 entitled Tightrope which contains previously unheard tracks written, performed and produced over varying periods of time.

== Discography ==
=== Albums ===
- Living Game November 1971
- To Friends 1972, reissued in Japan in 2006.
- Midnight Dreamer 1974
- Tightrope 2021

=== Singles ===
- "Living Game" B-side: "To The Sea", 22 October 1971
- "Friend Of Mine" B-side: "Situation Number Four", 11 February 1972
- "Nobody Knows Me" B-side: "After The First World War", 26 May 1972
- "Share The Load" B-side: "Mother Earth", 20 October 1972
- "Show Your Colours" B-side: "Spooked", 23 March 1973
