= Rabbit (song) =

1980 song by Chas & Dave

Single by Chas & Dave

from the album Don't Give a Monkey's
- B-side: "The Sideboard Song"
- Released: 23 November 1980
- Genre: Rockney
- Length: 2:23
- Label: Rockney
- Songwriter(s): Chas Hodges; Dave Peacock

Chas & Dave singles chronology
| "The Sideboard Song" (1979) | "Rabbit" (1980) | "Stars Over 45" (1981) |

Music video
- "Rabbit" on YouTube

"Rabbit" is a song by Chas & Dave from the album Don't Give a Monkey's, which was released as a single on 23 November 1980 and entered the UK Singles Chart at number 66. The song stayed in the charts for 8 weeks and peaked at number 8 on 17 January 1981. The song was used in a series of adverts for Courage Bitter.

== Composition ==
The title comes from the Cockney rhyming slang "rabbit and pork" meaning "talk". The song is about a relationship between a man and a woman, in which the man expresses his love for his girlfriend, but complains that she will not stop talking or, "rabbiting".

Chas & Dave began writing the song in a cottage they had rented in Ashington, West Sussex in the summer of 1978. Peacock first had the idea of writing about someone who talked a lot called "jaw-me-dead" while he was on holiday in Spain, and had the lines "You won't stop talking. Why don't you give it a rest? You’re nothing to me but a jaw-me-dead." Hodges however wanted something less obscure, and suggested "rabbit and pork" meaning "talk". This idea then evolved into a beautiful girl who would not stop talking, or "rabbiting", which Hodges thought could be an English version of the American song "You Talk Too Much". Hodges came up with the line "You've got more rabbit than Sainsbury's", which according to Hodges was a common local saying dating to the Second World War when meat was scarce, and rabbits were often sold by butchers with heads and tails still on so that people knew they were not buying a cat. They completed writing the song, although Hodges thought the song only "passable" when it was first written. Hodges later explained that the song was also partly inspired by the 1960 hit song "You Talk Too Much" by New Orleans R&B singer Joe Jones.

== Recording ==
The song was recorded at Portland Studios with sound engineer Andy Miller. At the recording, Peacock came up with the bass riff for the intro and other parts of the songs. When the sound engineer was balancing the mix, Peacock tried mouthing "rabbit" eight to the bar on the fade out, which Hodges liked. Peacock however thought it too fast to sing, so Hodges came up with the idea of both of them singing four "rabbit" to the bar, but one on the 'on' beat and the other on the 'off' beat. They practiced for 15 minutes to get it right and recorded in a couple of takes. Hodges thought it too good to be used only on the fade-out, so they put it on the intro and after the chorus. The first version recorded was used for the album.

The duo recorded a second, shorter, version a couple of weeks later because advertiser for the Courage Bitter wanted the song for their adverts. This version had one less verse and, according to Hodges, had a more 'live' feel that they prefer, and was therefore chosen as the single.

== Release and performances ==
The song was released as a single in November 1980. The duo performed the song on the children TV show Tiswas, and were interviewed by the presenter Sally James dressed as a rabbit. As there was still time before the end credit rolled, Chris Tarrant asked the duo to perform a ten-minute version which turned into an extended party, with the presenters pogoing in rabbit suits and guests Cannon and Ball dancing a conga. Following the performance, the song rose by over 20 places in the chart, where it eventually reached No. 8, becoming their first top ten hit.

Feminists however complained that that song was sexist, where men wanted their women to be quiet. Some threatened to disrupt their performance when Chas & Dave recorded a live show for BBC Radio 1 at the University of London.

The song was reissued in 2013 as part of Record Store Day on a 7 inch rabbit-shaped vinyl in a limited release of 800 copies.

== See also ==
- Chas & Dave discography
