= Ossie's Dream (Spurs Are on Their Way to Wembley) =

"Ossie's Dream (Spurs Are On Their Way To Wembley)"

Single by Chas & Dave, Tottenham Hotspur 1981 FA Cup Final squad
- B-side: "Glory, Glory, Tottenham Hotspur"
- Released: April 1981
- Recorded: Portland Studios
- Genre: Singalong, Football
- Label: Towerbell Records
- Songwriter(s): Chas Hodges, Dave Peacock
- Producer(s): Chas Hodges, Dave Peacock

"Ossie's Dream (Spurs Are On Their Way To Wembley)" is a single by the English football team Tottenham Hotspur, released as a souvenir to commemorate the team reaching the 1981 FA Cup Final. It was written by Dave Peacock of Chas & Dave and produced by the duo. The song reached number 5 in the UK Singles Chart after Tottenham won the FA Cup that year. It is still frequently chanted by Spurs supporters during matches. The B-side of the single is "Glory, Glory, Tottenham Hotspur".

== Background ==
The title refers to the club's Argentine player Osvaldo Ardiles, commonly known as Ossie. The premise of the song is that the Tottenham would be playing at Wembley in the final, and that it was a dream of Ardiles to play at Wembley. In his autobiography, titled Ossie's Dream: My Autobiography after the song, Ardiles said that the song is a 'true song' in that it was his dream to play at Wembley and that "reaching the FA Cup Final in 1981 was indeed a dream come true". However he also revealed that he was reluctant to sing the solo part and would have preferred the whole team to sing it. He was therefore initially unhappy about the recording but has since grown to be fond of the song. According to Chas Hodges of Chas & Dave, they persuaded Ardiles to sing his solo part as "in de cup for Tottingham" even though by then Ardiles already knew how to pronounce "Tottenham". He continued to deliberately mispronounce the name as "Tottingham", which would be the cause of ribbing by his teammate, and it remains a source of amusement many years later as revealed by Mauricio Pochettino.

=== Composition and recording ===
The song was largely written by Dave Peacock of the duo Chas & Dave, who were both fans of Tottenham Hotspur. Their manager Bob England, a fervent fan of the club, requested Peacock to write the song when Tottenham were having a good run in the 1980–81 FA Cup. They first made a demo which was then sent to the Tottenham Hotspur squad. Soon after the team had beaten Wolverhampton Wanderers in the semi-final of the FA Cup in April 1981, the whole squad went to the Portland Studios to record the song. The team recorded the song with uncredited vocals and instrumental accompaniment by Chas & Dave. They also recorded the song for the B-side of the single, "Glory, Glory, Tottenham Hotspur".

Chas & Dave were responsible for the production of the song. They finished mixing the songs in the early hours the next day, and the single was then quickly pressed and released in readiness for the Cup Final held on 9 May 1981. It was available for sale in North London within 48 hours of the recording, with the wives of Chas Hodges and Bob England delivering the records personally to shops around North London.

== Chart performance ==
The song first entered the UK singles chart at No. 45 on the chart dated 9 May 1981. It eventually reached No. 5 the week after Tottenham won the FA Cup, beating Manchester City in the replay.
