= Hot Shot Tottenham! =

Single

"Hot Shot Tottenham!" was a single released by the English football team Tottenham Hotspur, accompanied by Chas & Dave, to celebrate reaching the 1987 FA Cup Final (which Tottenham lost to Coventry City). It reached number 18 in the UK Singles Chart.
