= When the Year Ends in One =

Musical single released by the English football team Tottenham Hotspur in 1991

Single by Chas & Dave
- B-side: "Ossie's Dream"
- Genre: Pop
- Length: 3:31
- Label: A.1. Records

"When the Year Ends in One" was a single released by the English football team Tottenham Hotspur, with uncredited accompaniment by Chas & Dave, who composed the song, writing new lyrics to the tune of their 1982 song "London Girls" and former Lieutenant Pigeon manager David Whitehouse, to celebrate reaching the 1991 FA Cup Final. It reached number 44 in the UK Singles Chart.

The title of the song refers to the fact that during the twentieth century, the club won a number of major trophies, in particular the FA Cup, several times in years ending in 1. They continued the trend by going on to win the 1991 Final. "When the year ends in 1" has become a general superstition for supporters, although Tottenham have not won a trophy in such a year since 1991.

The major trophies to which the song and the superstition apply are:

- 1901 FA Cup
- 1921 FA Cup
- 1951 Football League First Division
- 1961 Football League First Division and FA Cup ("the Double")
- 1971 League Cup
- 1981 FA Cup
- 1991 FA Cup
