= Chas & Dave =

British pop rock band

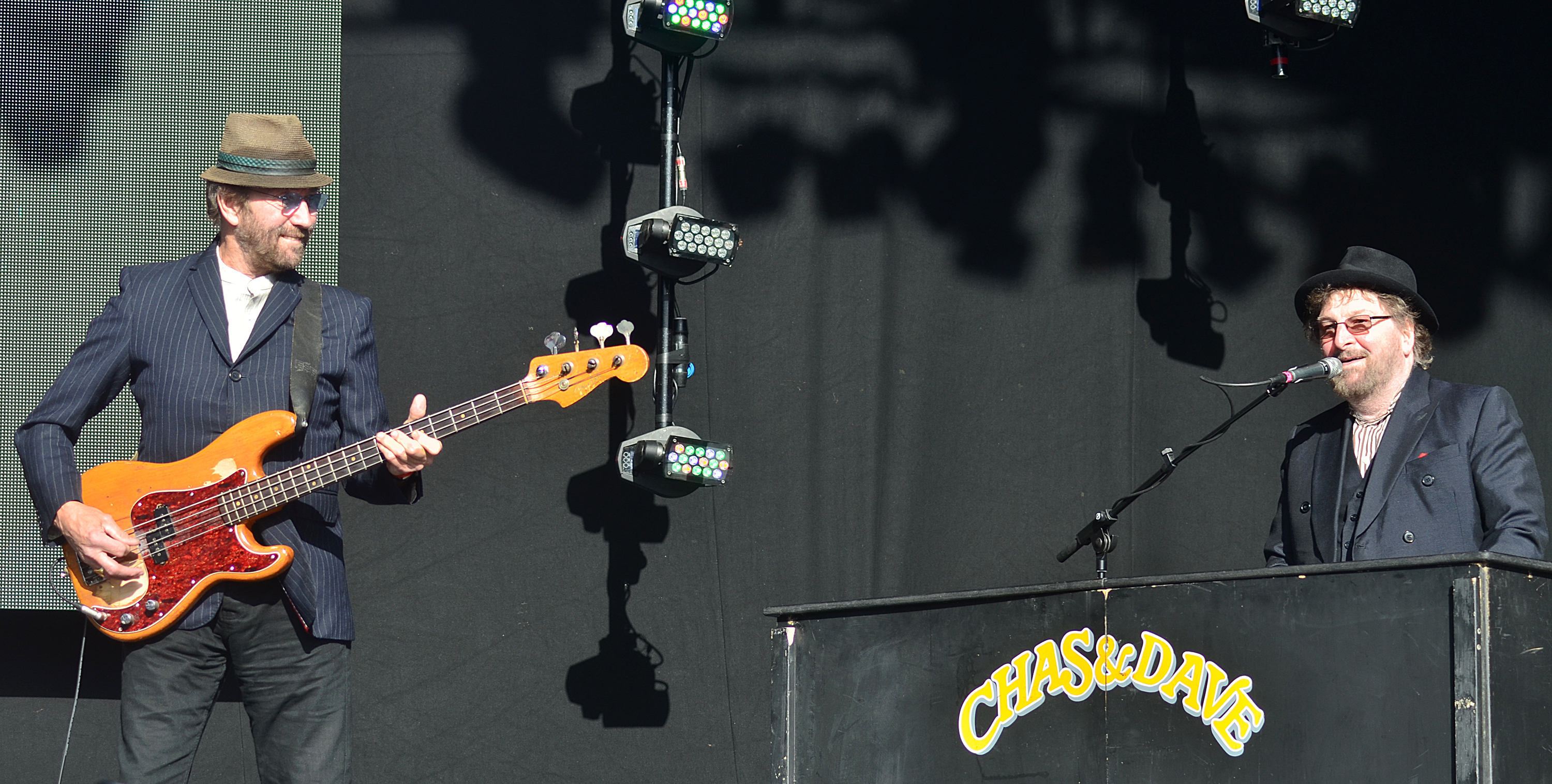
- Chas (right) & Dave at "Let's Rock Bristol", June 2015

Background information
- Origin: London, England
- Genres: Pop rock; folk
- Years active: 1972–2018
- Labels: Cooking Vinyl; Retreat; EMI; Rockney
- Past members: Chas Hodges; Dave Peacock; Micky Burt
- Website: chasndave.com

Chas & Dave (often billed as Chas 'n' Dave) were an English pop rock duo, formed in London by Chas Hodges and Dave Peacock.

They were most notable as creators and performers of a musical style labelled rockney (a portmanteau of rock and cockney), which mixes "pub singalong, music-hall humour, boogie-woogie piano and pre-Beatles rock 'n' roll". For a time, Rockney was also the name of their record label, their major breakthrough being "Gertcha" in 1979, which peaked at No. 20 in the UK Singles Chart, and was the first of eight Top 40 hit singles the duo played on. They had their biggest success in the early 1980s with "Rabbit" and "Ain't No Pleasing You". They also had nine charting albums. In October 2013 they released That's What Happens, their first studio album in 18 years.

== History ==
=== Formation ===
Charles Nicholas "Chas" Hodges and David Victor "Dave" Peacock met in 1963, but the duo only started writing songs together in 1972. In the 1960s and 1970s, Hodges and Peacock were in various groups. Hodges was with The Outlaws and then Cliff Bennett and the Rebel Rousers in the 1960s, while Dave Peacock was with a group called the Rolling Stones (formed before the more famous one), and The Tumbleweeds, and worked with Mick Greenwood and Jerry Donahue. Hodges and Peacock were both part of Black Claw with Harvey Hinsley and Mick Burt; three of them (Hodges, Peacock and Burt) would later be in Chas & Dave. They recorded with Albert Lee, and released an EP called Country Pie. After Black Claw, Hodges joined Heads Hands & Feet in 1970. Both Hodges and Peacock had worked as session musicians and in backing bands for a wide range of artists; Hodges as part of The Outlaws had worked with Jerry Lee Lewis, Gene Vincent, Bill Haley, and also supported the Beatles as the Rebel Rousers. The hook of the song on which Hodges and Peacock played guitar and bass in 1975, Labi Siffre's "I Got The...", was later sampled on Eminem's "My Name Is".

Hodges toured America when he was with Heads Hands & Feet, and it was during the tour that he had the idea of performing in his natural accent as he thought it "not quite real" performing in an American accent to an American audience. After Heads Hands & Feet broke up, in November 1972, Hodges spoke to Peacock about forming a band together where they can sing in their own accent and about things they knew. This would be the beginning of Chas & Dave. They had initially considered a few names, including Chubby. The name Chas & Dave came about when they were doing sessions together, and a producer often referred to them as one and said, "Here comes Chas and Dave", and later suggested: "Why don't you just call yourselves Chas and Dave?" They also recorded as Oily Rags (cockney rhyming slang for cigarettes - "fags"), and released a self-titled album with Gerry Hogan and Ian Wallace in 1974, as well as an album with Oliver Nelson. The album Oily Rags was released by Signature Records owned by Bob Thiele, whose wife Teresa Brewer recorded the first ever song written by Hodges and Peacock together, "Better Get Your Shoes On".

The duo recorded their first album as Chas & Dave in 1974, and this album, One Fing 'n' Anuvver, was released in 1975 under the Retreat Records label. Burt joined the duo in 1976 as a drummer, and although they were in fact a trio since, the duo of Hodges and Peacock remained the main focus of the band. They were signed by EMI in 1977, and the album Rockney was recorded that year and released in 1978. A song from the album, "Strummin'", was their first song to reach the chart. In early 1979, a song from their first album "Woortcha!" was used for a television commercial for Courage Bitter, and this song was then re-recorded and released as a single, retitled "Gertcha", which reached No. 20 on the singles chart. They opened for Led Zeppelin at the 1979 Knebworth Festival on two consecutive Saturdays on 4 and 11 August.

=== 1980s ===
Chas & Dave first signed a management deal in 1978 with Bob England, who with business partner Natasha England then formed the 'Rockney' label with the duo in 1980, part of the England's Towerbell Records company. The first single released under this label, "Rabbit" became their first top 10 hit single. The word "rabbit" comes from the Cockney rhyming slang rabbit and pork meaning talk. The song is about a relationship between a man and a woman, in which the man expresses his love for his girlfriend, but complains that she will not stop talking or, rabbiting. It was also used in a television commercial for Courage Bitter. On Christmas Day 1981 they appeared on The Two Ronnies Christmas Special.

The duo were both fans of the football club Tottenham Hotspur, and they began their musical association with the club in 1981 when they were requested by their manager Bob England to write a song for the club when Tottenham were having a good run in the 1980–81 FA Cup and looking to head to the FA Cup final. The resulting song was Ossie's Dream"/"Glory Glory Tottenham Hotspur". They also recorded "Tottenham, Tottenham" in 1982, and Tottenham Hotspur were victorious in both of these finals. They recorded two further singles with Tottenham – the 1987 FA Cup Final song "Hot Shot Tottenham!" and in 1991 when the team also won the FA Cup, "When the Year Ends in One". They also recorded "The Victory Song (We're Off To Wembley 'Cos We Beat The Arsenal)" in 1991.

In 1982, Chas & Dave had their biggest success on the chart with "Ain't No Pleasing You", which reached number two on the UK chart and also charted in Australia, New Zealand and Ireland. This song departed from their usual style and was a slower-paced break-up ballad, with strings added to the usual piano, drum and bass sound. The official video featured the orchestra backing the band. They were given a Christmas TV special on LWT that year, Chas and Dave's Christmas Knees-up. After the Christmas special, they were offered their own television series, Chas and Dave's Knees-up, broadcast in 1983.

In 1985, they recorded the theme song to the BBC sitcom In Sickness and in Health. Chas & Dave had previously been offered the chance to record the theme song for another BBC sitcom, Only Fools and Horses, but turned it down as they were in Australia at the time due to the success of "Ain't No Pleasing You". However, their song "Margate" was used in a feature-length episode of the series entitled "The Jolly Boys' Outing" in 1989. They also created the theme tune and incidental music for the children television show Bangers and Mash, and recorded the title theme for Crackerjack! used in the 1980s.

"Snooker Loopy", a comic song about snooker, was released as a single in May 1986 and entered the UK Singles Chart, reaching number six.

=== Later years ===
In 1992 & 1993 Chas & Dave recorded their own series for BBC Radio 2, produced by Sonia Beldom. There were three episodes recorded at The Starlight Suite at Enfield Football Club with special guests the Searchers, Max Bygraves, Warren Mitchell & Stanley Unwin. "Chas & Dave's Christmas Cracker" & "Chas & Dave's Easter Rabbit" featured Marti Caine, the Salvation Army Band, the Barron Knights, Albert Lee & Little and Large. In 2003, Chas & Dave appeared on the 2003 Jools' Annual Hootenanny, which led to renewed interest in the band. In 2003–4, they supported The Libertines, whose singer Pete Doherty said that they were a big influence when he was young. They played the Glastonbury Festival in 2005 where they played to a crowd of 18,000 on the acoustic stage, and Hodges would later describe it as their best gig. They played again at the festival in 2007. In 2005, EMI released a CD of their first two studio albums, and made a new set of their recordings at Abbey Road.

On 6 October 2008, their autobiography, Chas & Dave – All About Us, written by Hodges, was published in the UK. It is reported that it took him a quarter of a century to write.

It was announced in September 2009 that the pair would no longer be working together, as Peacock planned to retire from the band following the death of his wife, Sue. However, In June 2010, it was announced that Chas & Dave would reunite for one final tour in 2011. Burt retired from the band, with Chas's son, Nicholas Charles "Nik" Hodges, taking over on drums. They also played their "Christmas Jamboree" at the IndigO2 on 23 and 24 December 2011 and 8 December 2012.

In 2012, they wrote a song with Nik Hodges called "Head to Head (With the Undead)" for the movie Cockneys Vs Zombies credited as Hodges and Peacock. Joan Hodges also received a credit as a character in the film.

In October 2012, they were subject of the BBC Four documentary Chas & Dave: Last Orders. It was announced on 4 October 2012 that they would be the sixth act announced to play Rebellion Festival, as part of their last tour. Their subsequent "Back By Demand" tour of the UK occurred between February and May 2013.

In October 2013, they released That's What Happens, their first studio album in 18 years. In July 2014, Hodges appeared in the first episode of Graham Fellows' BBC Radio 4 comedy series John Shuttleworth's Lounge Music. On 7 August 2014 they played at the annual Cropredy Festival near Banbury. On 19 October, the official website announced the death of Mick Burt, their original drummer, the previous day.

On 9 May 2015, they performed at VE Day 70: A Party to Remember in Horse Guards Parade, London. They also performed on the main stage at the Sunshine Festival in Upton-Upon-Severn on 30 August 2015. In December, they took their traditional Christmas show to the Hammersmith Apollo. In 2016, the band played in the week 7 episode of BBC One's Strictly Come Dancing, performing their song "Rabbit".

== Musical style ==
The songs for which Chas & Dave are most known are partly comic, and Chas & Dave are strongly identified with London's blue collar and working class pub sing-song culture. Their musical style is called rockney combining "rock" and "cockney", a word Hodges coined in 1976. The style, performed in a London accent, is a fusion of London music hall and rock and roll. The rockney style was intentional from the beginning: when Hodges and Peacock got together as a duo in 1972, they felt an alternative to the way British bands copied American accents was needed. Hodges had toured America with Heads Hands & Feet and was performing in an American accent. He said:

I was singing in an American accent. I thought, 'You're being a fraud, you should sing in your own accent', and that's when I started to work on the idea.

He then contacted Peacock about the possibility of forming a band performing songs in their natural voice. According to Hodges, "One Fing 'n' Anuvver", the title track of their first album as Chas & Dave, was their first Rockney song. He first developed the style by speaking the lyrics out loud in his natural spoken accent and phrasing after he had written them. The melody was then added to the words so that his natural voice comes out when singing, instead of an imitation American accent.

== Chas’s death and band legacy ==
On 22 September 2018, Hodges died from pneumonia following treatment for cancer, aged 74.

Chas & Dave's work influenced The Libertines, who played their songs at rehearsals.

== Chas and Dave's Knees Up ==
In 1983, Chas & Dave presented their own variety show, made by LWT and broadcast on ITV, which was set in an East End pub.

- Episode 1: 21 May 1983, Appearing: Eric Burdon, Linda Lewis and Jeff Stevenson
- Episode 2: 4 June 1983, Appearing: Lulu, Rocky Sharpe and the Replays, Natasha England, Bobby Knutt and Roy Jay
- Episode 3: 11 June 1983, Appearing: Mike Berry, The Flying Pickets and Dave Ismay
- Episode 4: 18 June 1983, Appearing: Paul Shane, Captain Sensible and Berni Flint
- Episode 5: 25 June 1983, Appearing: Clarence "Frogman" Henry, Rose-Marie and Jimmy Jones
- Episode 6: 2 July 1983, Appearing: Lonnie Donegan, Diz and The Doormen and Gary Wilmot
- Xmas Knees Up: 25 December 1982, Appearing: Jimmy Cricket, Eric Clapton and Jim Davidson, among others. Channel Five and Yesterday (UK) have repeated this episode at Christmas time, which featured a similar setting to the series. Repeat transmissions have cut out Davidson's set.

== Discography ==
Studio albums

- One Fing 'n' Anuvver 1975
- Rockney 1977
- Don't Give a Monkeys 1979
- Chas & Dave 1979
- The Christmas Jamboree Bag 1981
- Mustn't Grumble 1982
- Job Lot 1982
- Knees Up – Christmas Jamboree Bag No.2 1983
- Aint No Pleasin' You 1983
- Well Pleased 1984
- Jamboree Bag No.3 1985
- Christmas Carol Album 1986
- Flying 1987
- That's What Happens 2013
- A Little Bit of Us 2018
