= Chas Hodges =

English musician and singer (1943–2018)

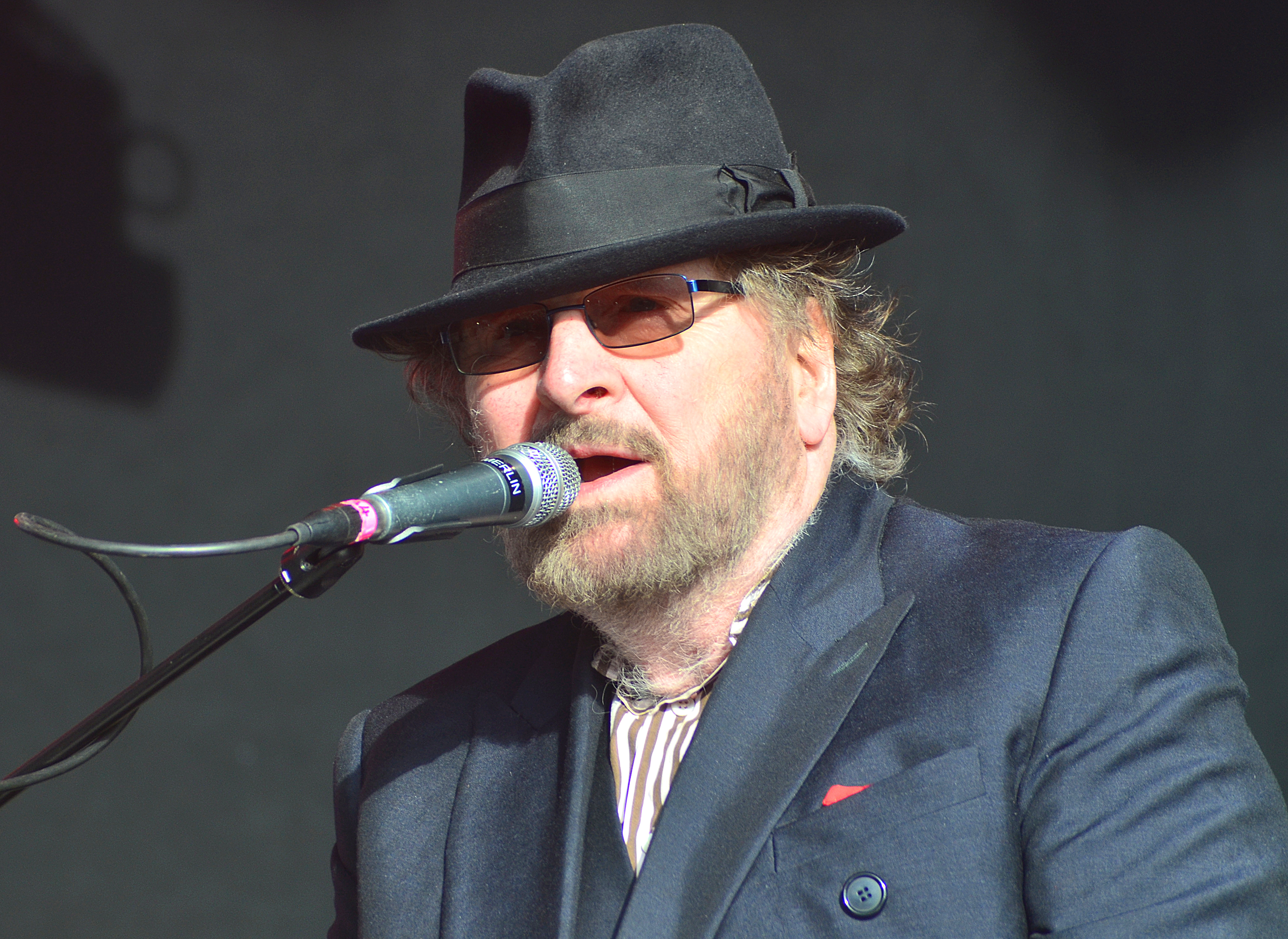
- Hodges at Let's Rock Bristol, June 2015

Background information
- Born: Charles Nicholas Hodges; 28 December 1943; Edmonton, Middlesex, England
- Died: 22 September 2018 (aged 74) Tottenham, England
- Genres: Rock, pop, rockney
- Occupations: Singer, musician
- Instruments: Vocals, piano, guitar, bass, banjo
- Years active: 1960–2018
- Labels: Retreat, EMI, Rockney, His Master's Voice
- Formerly of: Chas & Dave, Cliff Bennett and the Rebel Rousers, The Outlaws, Heads Hands & Feet, Chas & His Band
- Website: chashodges.com

Charles Nicholas Hodges (28 December 1943 – 22 September 2018) was an English musician and singer. He was the lead vocalist, pianist and guitarist of the musical duo Chas & Dave, whose most successful singles include "Rabbit" (1980) and "Ain't No Pleasing You" (1982). Earlier in his career, he was a member of Joe Meek-produced instrumental group the Outlaws and the country rock band Heads Hands & Feet. As a session musician, he backed Gene Vincent, Jerry Lee Lewis and Labi Siffre.

== Early life ==
Hodges was born at the North Middlesex University Hospital in Edmonton on 28 December 1943 to Albert and Daisy Hodges. He was named Charles Nicholas, but called Chas as it is a common abbreviation for Charles. He was raised in north London, and moved to Kent in the summer of 1947. His father committed suicide just before Hodges turned four. After his father's death, the family returned to Edmonton in north London to live with his grandparents, with his mother making a living playing piano in local pubs and clubs. He attended Eldon Road School, and later Edmonton Higher Grade School but left just before he was 15 at the end of 1958.

Hodges first became interested in Rock 'n' Roll music after listening to Little Richard on Radio Luxembourg around 1956. He was then inspired by Lonnie Donegan to learn to play the guitar when he was 12, and joined a skiffle band a year later in 1957, the Horseshoe Skiffle Group. In May 1958, he attended a Jerry Lee Lewis concert and became interested in learning to play the piano. He worked for a while in a jeweller's shop after leaving school.

== Career ==
Hodges became a professional musician by the age of 16, playing bass guitar with various local bands until he joined Billy Gray and the Stormers in 1960. After Billy Gray and the Stormers broke up, Hodges worked with the producer Joe Meek, who put Hodges and his former band together as backing band for Mike Berry, forming the Outlaws. The line up included Mick Underwood, later drummer in heavy rock act Gillan, and were later joined by lead guitarist and later Deep Purple founding member Ritchie Blackmore. They also worked as session musicians, backing Jerry Lee Lewis, Bill Haley and Gene Vincent. Hodges said he learned the piano by watching Jerry Lee Lewis whilst backing him. During this time, Hodges became known as "Sleepy" after his habit of falling asleep during the recording process. The Outlaws broke up, and he was invited to join Cliff Bennett and the Rebel Rousers as a bass player in 1965.

Hodges had known Dave Peacock for a number of years; they met in 1963 when a friend of Peacock gave Hodges a lift home and found they had similar taste in music. After the Rebel Rousers, Hodges joined Peacock, Harvey Hinsley and Mick Burt in Black Claw (three of the band would later be in Chas & Dave). In 1970, Albert Lee asked him to join a new band Heads Hands & Feet, who supported Blackmore's subsequent band Deep Purple on tour. He played bass with Purple for one show on 8 March 1971, at the Music Hall in Aberdeen, substituting for the regular bassist, Roger Glover, who was ill. They attempted to form a new breakaway band named the New Heads Hands & Feet, but Lee left to play for the Crickets, and they finished as a band.

=== Chas & Dave ===
Hodges toured America when he was with Heads Hands & Feet, and it was during the tour that he began to have the idea of performing in his natural accent as he thought it "not quite real" performing in an American accent to an American audience. When Heads Hands & Feet broke up in 1972, Hodges and Peacock considered forming a band together, singing in their own accent about things they knew. They began to perform as a duo Chas & Dave. Hodges was originally a bass player, but in Chas & Dave he played the piano and guitar while Peacock played bass. They also recorded as Oily Rags (cockney rhyming slang for cigarettes - "fags") with Gerry Hogan and Ian Wallace, releasing a self-titled album in 1974 and performing as a backing band on albums by Oliver Nelson and Teresa Brewer. In 1975, Hodges and Peacock played on Labi Siffre's album Remember My Song. Eminem would later sample a riff from the song "I Got The..." (featuring Hodges on guitar and Peacock on bass) on his 1999 hit "My Name Is".

Hodges and Peacock recorded their first album as Chas & Dave in 1974, and this album, One Fing 'n' Anuvver, was released in 1975. According to Hodges, the title track "One Fing 'n' Anuvver" was their first Rockney song. Burt joined the duo in 1976 as a drummer. They were signed by EMI in 1978, and the album Rockney was released the same year. A song from the album, "Strummin'", was their first song to reach the chart. In early 1979, a song from their first album, "Woortcha!", was used for a notable television commercial for Courage Bitter; the song was then re-recorded and released as a single, retitled "Gertcha". They opened for Led Zeppelin at the 1979 Knebworth Festival.

In 1980, Chas & Dave formed their own record label, Rockney, with their manager Bob England. Their first release under this label, "Rabbit", became a top 10 hit. They had a bigger hit song in 1982 with "Ain't No Pleasing You", written largely by Hodges.

Hodges was popular amongst supporters of Tottenham Hotspur Football Club owing to singles he had released as Chas & Dave. These include "Glory Glory Tottenham Hotspur", "Hot Shot Tottenham!", "When the Year Ends in One", "Spurs Medley" and "Ossie's Dream (Spurs Are on Their Way to Wembley)".

He also played piano for short-lived supergroup called the Rockers, which featured Roy Wood, Phil Lynott and John Coghlan.

In 2009, following the death of his wife Sue, Peacock announced his retirement from performing with Chas & Dave. He changed his mind the following year, and announced a tour for 2011.

They also played their "Christmas Jamboree" at the IndigO2 in December 2011 and December 2012. The duo undertook a 'Back By Demand' tour of the UK between February and May 2013. In 2012, Hodges wrote and recorded a charity single with his band and 2012 Premier League Darts players called "Got My Tickets for the Darts". The video featured Hodges, his band, the 2012 Premier League Darts players, and walk-on girl Jacqui Adams. It was released on 18 May, the night after the play-offs at the O2 arena in London, where it was premiered, and proceeds from the single were donated to the Haven House Children's Hospice, in Woodford Green, Essex.

In 2009, Hodges released an eponymous solo album on Talking Elephant Records. In 2010, he guested on an album by Vince Eager (on Western Star Records) called 788 Years of Rock n Roll; the following year, Hodges returned to the label to record a solo album titled Together We Made Music. In 2014, Hodges also guested on Simon Fowler's new band Merrymouth's album, Wenlock Hill, contributing piano on the song "Salt Breeze".

Hodges was a keen gardener. In 2014, he started his Rock n Roll Allotment column in the British newspaper the Daily Express.

== Illness and death ==
On 6 February 2017, it was announced that Hodges had been diagnosed with oesophageal cancer. A statement on social media said the illness had been caught "at an early stage", and that he would be undergoing treatment immediately. The pair stated that they hoped to be "back out on the road" soon.

He died in his sleep in the early hours of 22 September 2018, from complications of pneumonia, aged 74.

== Discography ==
=== Albums ===
Solo

- Drivin' You Wild (Regal Records, 1966)
- Got to Get You into My Life (EMI Records, 1966)
- Soul Sounds (Columbia Records, 1967)
- That's All Right Mama (Castle Music Records, 1970)
- Green Bullfrog (Decca Records, 1971)
- Heads Hands & Feet (Capitol Records, 1971)
- Tracks (Island Records, 1972)
- Road Show (BBC Transcription Services, 1972)
- Old Soldiers Never Die (Atlantic Records, 1973)
- The Session Recorded in London with Great Guest Artists (Mercury Records, 1973)
- Images (Blow Up, 1973)
- Teresa Brewer in London with Oily Rags (Flying Dutchman, 1973)
- Teresa Brewer in London (Amsterdam Records, 1973)
- Oliver Edward Nelson in London with Oily Rags (Flying Dutchman Records, 1974)
- Big Jim's Back (Retreat Records, 1974)
- Whatever Mood You're In (Retreat Records, 1974)
- The Jackie Lynton Album (WWA Records, 1974)
- No Axe to Grind (BB Records, 1979)
- Remember My Song (EMI Records, 1975)
- Sioux (Anchor Records, 1976)
- Glenn Cardier (EMI Records, 1976)
- Living in the Shadow of a Downtown Movie Show (Decca Records, 1977)
- Bang Your Door (EMI Records, 1978)
- Hiding (A&M Records, 1979)
- Beowulf (Edsel Records, 1995)
- The Unreleased Album (Radioactive Records, 2004)
- Chas Hodges (Talking Elephant Records, 2009)
- Together We Made Music (Western Star Records, 2011)
- 788 Years of Rock n Roll (Western Star Records, 2011)
- Land of Lions (Burnout Records, 2013)
- Wenlock Hill (Navigator, 2014)
- Chas & J.I. - Before We Grow Too Old (Castle Music, 2018)
- Gilbert O'Sullivan (BMG, 2018)

with the Outlaws

- The Crazy Beat of Gene Vincent (Rockin' Jamboree Records, live 1963)

=== Singles and EPs ===
Solo

- "Two Timing Baby / Will It Happen to Me?" (Ember Records, 1961)
- "As from Tonight" (demo) (RPM Records, 1962)
- "Stairway to a Star" (demo) (RPM Records, 1963)
- "Full Grown Doll" (demo) (RPM Records, 1963)
- "You Got What I Want" (demo) (RPM Records, 1964)
- "Merry Go Round / Go On Then" (His Master's Voice, 1963)
- "Don't Think Twice It's All Right / Big Fat Spider" (Columbia Records, 1964)
- "Digging My Potatoes / She Ain't Coming Back" (Columbia Records, 1965)
- "Satisfy My Soul / My Only Souvenir" (Line Records, 1966)
- "I Shall Be Released / Down in the Flood" (Columbia Records, 1968)
- "Madena / Standing Still" (Pye Records, 1968)
- "Good Times / Sally" (Revolver Records, 1969)
- "Across the Great Divide / Sally" (Bell Records, 1969)
- "Walkin' Shoes / Around and Around" (Line Records, 1969)
- "Your Cheatin' Heart / Breathless" (Line Records, 1970)
- "Reelin' and Rockin' / Ballad of Billy Joe" (Line Records, 1970)
- "Black Claw / Balls of Fire" (Line Records, 1970)
- "Bei Mir Bist Du Schon (Means That You're Grand) / Bo Weevil" (Amsterdam Records, 1973)
- "Green Door / San Francisco Bay" (Signature Records, 1974)
- "We Are the Boys (Who Make All the Noise) / Rockin' on the Stage" (CBS, 1983)
- "Got My Ticket for the Darts" (as Chas Hodges & the Premier League Boys) (Matchroom Sport Ltd, 2012)

with the Outlaws

- "Will You Love Me Tomorrow" / "My Baby Doll" (Decca, 1961)
- "Tribute to Buddy Holly" / "What's the Matter" (His Master's Voice, 1961)
- "It's Just a Matter of Time" / "Little Boy Blue" (His Master's Voice, 1962)
- "Don't You Think It's Time" / "Loneliness" (with the Admirals a.k.a. the Outlaws) (His Master's Voice, 1962)
- "My Little Baby" / "You'll Do It You'll Fall in Love" (His Master's Voice, 1963)
- "Johnny Remember Me / There Must Be" (Top Rank International, 1961)
- "Telstar" (demo) / "Telstar" (2nd stage demo) (Decca Records, 1962)
- "San Francisco Bay / Like a Bird Without Feathers" (Decca Records, 1962)
- "The Birds & the Bees / Something at the Bottom of My Garden" (demo) (Decca Records, 1962)
- "Poppin' Part I / Poppin' Part II" (Parlophone Records, 1962)
- "If You've Got to Pick a Baby / In the First Place" (His Master's Voice, 1963)
- In Sweden EP (His Master's Voice, 1963)
- "Thou Shalt Not Steal / Been Invited to a Party" (His Master's Voice, 1965)
- "A Fool Such as I / It's Nice In't It?" (Decca Records, 1964)
- "Tell the Truth / Shut Up" (Pye Records, 1964)
- "Galway Bay / Livin' Alone" (Parlophone Records, 1964)
- Ramona EP (Parlophone Records, 1964)
- "The Bike Beat 1 / The Bike Beat 2" (Lyntone, 1964)
- "Girls Go for Guys / Chico" (Guyden Records, 1964)
- "Bouncing Bass / Let Me In" (Fontana Records, 1965)
- "Hurt Me / It Can Happen to You" (Pye Records, 1965)
- "To Know Him Is to Love Him/..." (Chattahoochie, 1965)
- "Satan's Holliday / Earthshaker" (Titan, 1965)
- "Little Brown Jug / Getaway" (Line Records, 1965)

== Publications ==
- Chas & Dave: All About Us (2008)
- Chas and His Rock 'n' Roll Allotment (2010)
- 101 Facts you didn't know about Chas and Dave (2013)
- Memories of The Lane: Good Times at Tottenham (2018)

== Bibliography ==
- Hodges, Chas (October 2009). Chas and Dave: All About Us. John Blake. ISBN 9781857828269.
