= Dave Peacock (musician) =

English musician and bass guitarist (born 1945)

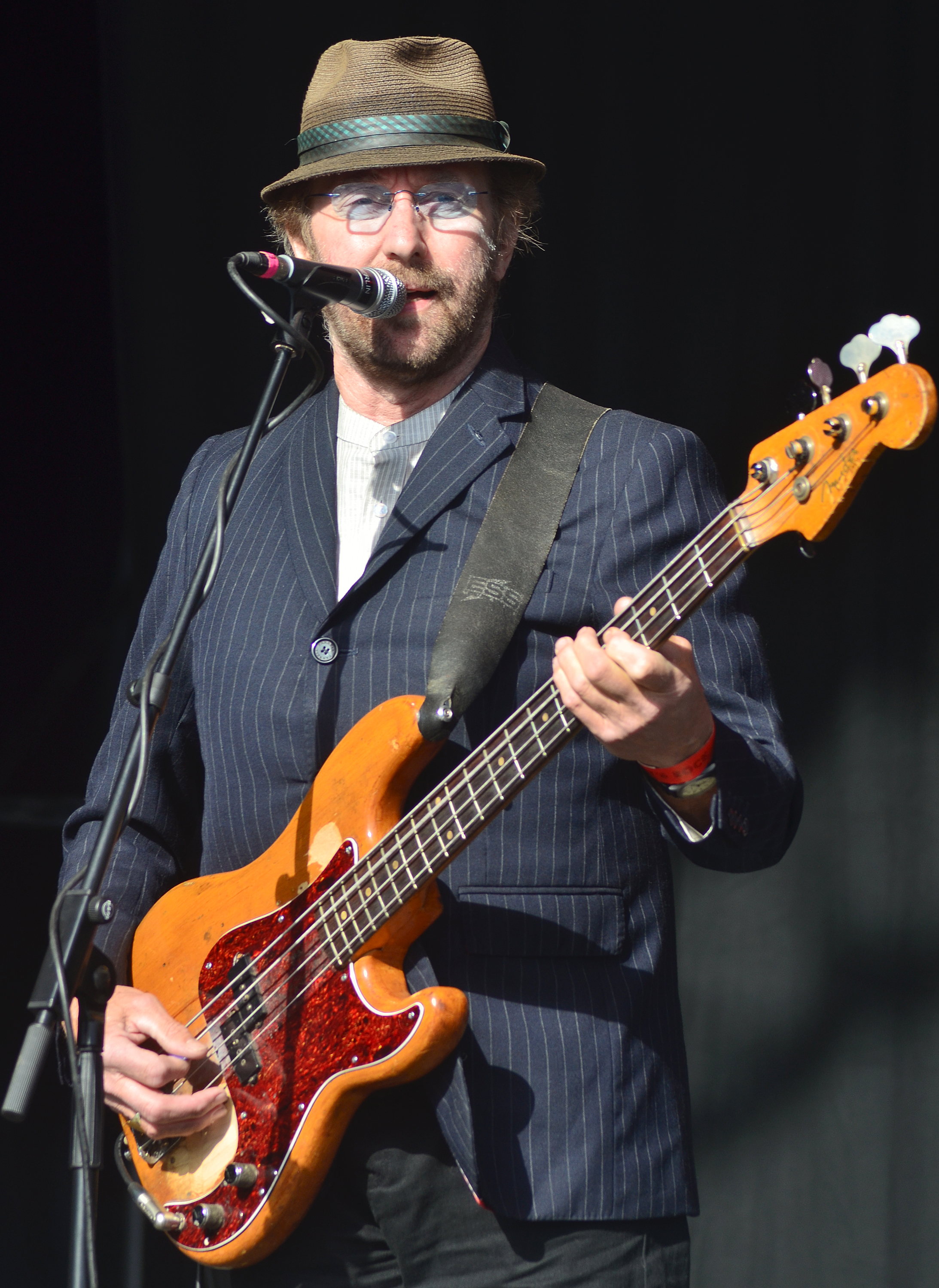
- Dave Peacock at Let's Rock Bristol, 6 June 2015.

Background information
- Born: David Victor Peacock; 24 May 1945 (age 81); Enfield, Middlesex, England
- Genres: Rock, pop, comedy pop
- Occupation: Musician
- Instruments: Vocals, piano, bass guitar, guitar, banjo, ukulele
- Years active: 1960–present
- Labels: Retreat, EMI, Rockney
- Formerly of: Chas & Dave
- Website: chasndave.net

David Victor Peacock (born 24 May 1945) is an English musician and bass guitarist. He was brought up in the Ponders End and Freezywater areas of Enfield. Peacock is best known as having been one half of the English musical duo Chas & Dave from 1974 until the death of Chas Hodges in 2018.

== Career ==
Earlier in his career in the 1960s, Peacock was in a group called the Rolling Stones (formed in 1960 before the more famous band of the same name), as well as The Tumbleweeds, he also worked with Mick Greenwood and Jerry Donahue. He met Chas Hodges in 1963 when he and his friend gave Hodges a lift home, and became friends when they found they had a similar taste in music. Later in the late 1960s they became part of a group called Black Claw together with Harvey Hinsley and Mick Burt; they recorded tracks with Albert Lee. Black Claw was short-lived, and Peacock left to join a country and western band, while Hodges joined Heads Hands & Feet in 1970.

=== Chas & Dave ===
In 1972, Peacock and Hodges decided to form a band together which would be the beginning of Chas & Dave. In their early years, they recorded as Oily Rags (cockney rhyming slang for cigarettes - "fags") with Gerry Hogan and Ian Wallace, releasing a self-titled album in 1974. They also worked as session musicians and recorded albums at this time with Oliver Nelson and Teresa Brewer. Both played on Labi Siffre's album Remember My Song in 1975. Eminem would later sample a riff from the song "I Got The..." (featuring Hodges on guitar and Peacock on bass) on his 1999 hit "My Name Is".

One of the early songs Peacock and Hodges wrote together, "Gertcha", would become a hit in 1979 after it was used in a television advert for Courage bitter. They would have a number of hit songs together, including "Rabbit" and "Ain't No Pleasing You". They also recorded a number of songs with Tottenham Hotspur F.C., both being fans of the team; the first song they wrote for the club, "Ossie's Dream", was largely written by Peacock.

In 2009, following the death of his wife Sue (Susan Heath; born 1946 in Croydon, married in Greenwich in 1973) Peacock announced his retirement from performing with Chas & Dave. However, in 2010 the band announced a tour for the following year. They also played their "Christmas Jamboree" at the IndigO2 on 23 and 24 December 2011 and 8 December 2012. After this they had a "Back by Demand" tour of the UK between 28 February and 16 May 2013. The double act ended with Hodges' death from pneumonia on 22 September 2018.

== Discography ==
=== With Black Claw ===
- "Good Times / Sally" (Revolver Records, 1969, single)
- "Across the Great Divide / Sally" (Bell Records, 1969, single)
- "Walkin' Shoes / Around and Around" (Line Records, 1969, single)
- That's All Right Mama (Castle Music Records, 1970)

=== With Spike Island ===
- Spike Island (Avenue Records, 1971)

=== With Françoise Hardy ===
- Françoise Hardy (Sonopresse, 1972)

=== With Mick Greenwood ===
- ...To Friends (MCA Records, 1972)

=== With Magna Carta ===
- Lord of the Ages (Vertigo Records, 1973)

=== With Carolanne Pegg ===
- Carolanne Pegg (Transatlantic Records, 1973)

=== With Prelude ===
- How Long Is Forever? (Pye Records, 1973)

=== With Teresa Brewer ===
- Teresa Brewer in London with Oily Rags (Flying Dutchman, 1973)
- Teresa Brewer in London (Amsterdam Records, 1973)
- Bei Mir Bist Du Schon (Means That You're Grand) / Bo Weevil (Amsterdam Records, 1973, single)

=== With Oliver Nelson ===
- Oliver Edward Nelson in London with Oily Rags (Flying Dutchman Records, 1974)

=== With Big Jim Sullivan ===
- Big Jim's Back (Retreat Records, 1974)

=== With Les Walker ===
- Whatever Mood You're In (Retreat Records, 1974)

=== With Labi Siffre ===
- Remember My Song (EMI Records, 1975)

=== With Mike Berry ===
- Rock's in My Head (Polydor Records, 1976)

=== With Sioux ===
- Sioux (Anchor Records, 1976)

=== With Tony Ashton ===
- The Crezz (Handkerchief Records, 1976)

=== With Albert Lee ===
- Hiding (A&M Records, 1979)

=== With Jackie Lynton ===
- No Axe to Grind (Performance Music, 1980)

=== With Dave Edmunds ===
- D. E. 7 (Arista Records, 1982)
- Hand Picked Musical Fantasies (Handpicked Records, 1999)

=== With Wild Men of Wonga ===
- Why Don't Pretty Girls (Look at Me) (Weird Science - Music from the Motion Picture Soundtrack, 1985)

=== With Jerry Donahue ===
- Telecasting (Music Maker Records, 1988)
- Neck of the Wood (The Road Goes On Forever, 1992)

=== With Danny McCulloch's Friends ===
- Beowulf (Edsel Records, 1995)

=== With Hereward Kaye ===
- The Golden Mile (Secret Society Records, 2001)

=== With Marc Ellington ===
- Restoration (Talking Elephant Records, 2011)
