= Siffre =

Siffre is a surname. Notable people with the surname include:

- Labi Siffre (born 1945), British singer, songwriter and poet
- Michel Siffre (1939–2024), French geologist, speleologist and underground explorer

== See also ==
- Labi Siffre (album), Labi Siffre studio album from 1970
- Siffredi, an Italian surname
