= Glow in the Dark Tour =

2007–2008 world concert tour by Kanye West

- Tour by Kanye West
- Location: Asia; Australia; Europe; New Zealand; North America; South America
- Associated albums: Graduation - 808s & Heartbreak
- Start date: November 22, 2007
- End date: December 7, 2008
- Legs: 6
- No. of shows: 63
- Supporting acts: Lupe Fiasco; N.E.R.D.; Rihanna; Mr Hudson and the Library; Consequence; Tony Williams; Kid Cudi; Nas
- Box office: $30.8 million (Note: Amount grossed over the first 49 dates)

Kanye West concert chronology
- Touch the Sky Tour (2005–06); Glow in the Dark Tour (2007–08); Fame Kills: Starring Kanye West and Lady Gaga (2009–10) (canceled)

The Glow in the Dark Tour was the third concert tour by American rapper Kanye West, in support of his third studio album, Graduation (2007). West shared the first tour dates across the United Kingdom in September 2007, while he later announced the American leg in January 2008. He engaged in precise tour rehearsals and enlisted Jim Henson's Creature Shop for production of his set, with design handled by Esmeralda Devlin, Martin Phillips, and John McGuire. West mostly performed music from his first three studio albums and incorporated work on later legs from his 2008 album 808s & Heartbreak; the songs were re-arranged by the touring band to have a more melancholy sound. The concerts followed a space opera concept that saw West traveling in his spaceship Jane and then performing on a desolate planet, where he sought more power towards the end. The tour began in London on November 22, 2007, travelling across the United States, South America, Europe, and Oceania until its last show in Brisbane on December 7, 2008. West made a tour stop at the 2008 Bonnaroo Music Festival, although delays faced to his set caused a negative backlash.

West was supported by Lupe Fiasco, N.E.R.D., and Rihanna for the tour's US leg in the spring of 2008, while he was later accompanied by acts such as Consequence and Kid Cudi across Europe. The Glow in the Dark Tour received generally positive reviews from critics, who frequently highlighted its space theme. Some praised West's skill as a performer, although a few critics found the tour repetitive. It grossed $30.8 million from 49 shows, marking the third highest-grossing hip-hop tour for 2008. The tour was sponsored in the US by the Absolut Vodka brand, whom collaborated with West on a retro commercial that showed tablets which transformed others into him. Nabil Elderkin published various tour photographs in his book, Glow in the Dark (2009).

== Background ==
On September 5, 2007, West announced the Glow in the Dark Tour in promotion of his third studio album Graduation. The tour was set to run its first leg from November 21–26, spanning seven dates across the United Kingdom. The first show was supposed to be a two-night concert at Hammersmith Apollo in London, until West moved it to the city's O2 Arena on the night of November 22, 2007, as a result of heavy demand. West was precise in rehearsals for the tour, which was rumored to have caused problems in his relationship with Alexis Phifer. The design for the set was done by Esmeralda Devlin, Martin Phillips, and John McGuire. Devlin had previously handled the design for West's Touch the Sky Tour (2005–06) and later served in that role for the Watch the Throne Tour (2011–12) and The Yeezus Tour (2013–14). On January 30, 2008, Kanye posted to his blog that he would be embarking on a tour leg for this year across North America, in the wake of the UK stint's success and the death of his mother Donda West. He announced the support acts of fellow rapper Lupe Fiasco, band N.E.R.D., and Barbadian singer Rihanna. Kanye West and Lupe Fiasco had previously collaborated on the 2007 song "Us Placers" with Pharrell Williams under the supergroup Child Rebel Soldier, while the two rappers and Rihanna were among the award recipients at the 50th Annual Grammy Awards. West teased his tour set-up to his US audience at the ceremony by wearing a flashing LED jacket and luminous shades, with neon lighting covering the stage.

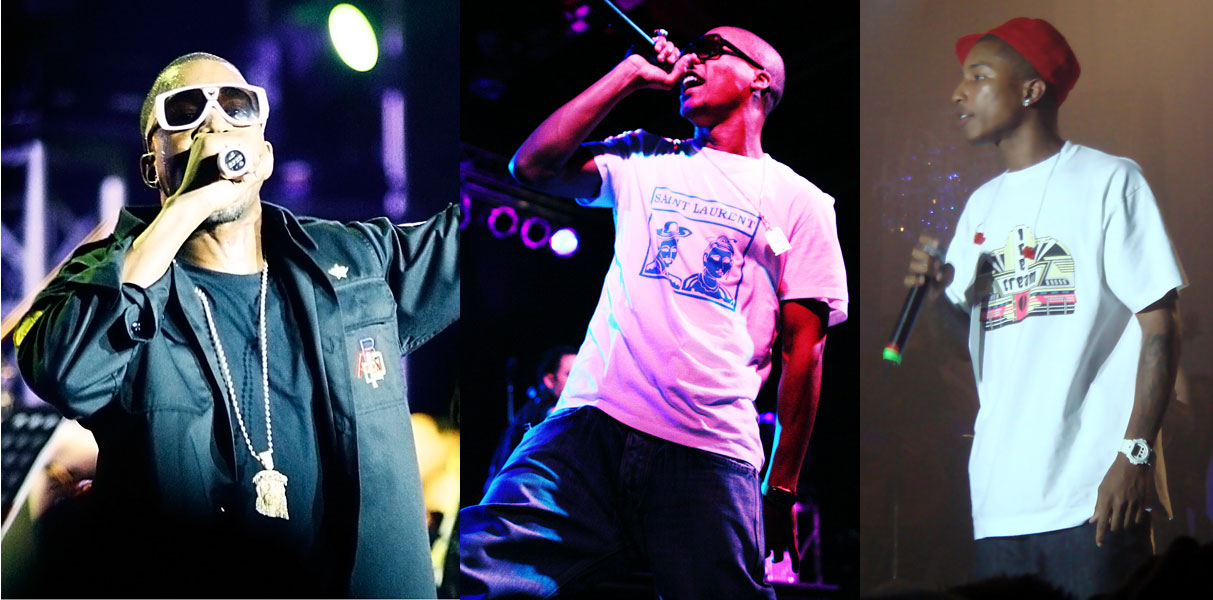
Child Rebel Soldier was a group that consisted of West, Lupe Fiasco, and Pharrell Williams, pictured from left to right. The former two also embarked on the tour together across the United States.

In February 2008, West's label Def Jam announced the North American tour dates from April 16–May 30. The label also issued a statement that Rihanna would be absent from the shows in Las Vegas, Nevada, and Albuquerque, New Mexico during April 2008. That same month, West revealed that he enlisted Jim Henson's Creature Shop, the company whom built the Muppets, for production of the set. For the Glow in the Dark tour's first US show at KeyArena in Seattle, Washington on April 16, 2008, Lupe Fiasco, Rihanna, and N.E.R.D. had 30-minute sets each, succeeded by West's 90-minute set. In August 2008, West announced dates across the UK for November. Following a show at The O2 Arena, the rapper wished for normalcy rather than being "under scrutiny and paparazzi" on the tour, expressing that he missed his mother and had "sacrificed real life" for his career. From October 17 to December 7, 2008, West visited Mexico, South America, Europe, and Oceania for four legs of the Glow in the Dark Tour. He was supported by the likes of Mr Hudson and the Library, Consequence, Tony Williams, and Kid Cudi for the leg across Europe, while Nas accompanied him for shows in Oceania.

== Concert synopsis ==
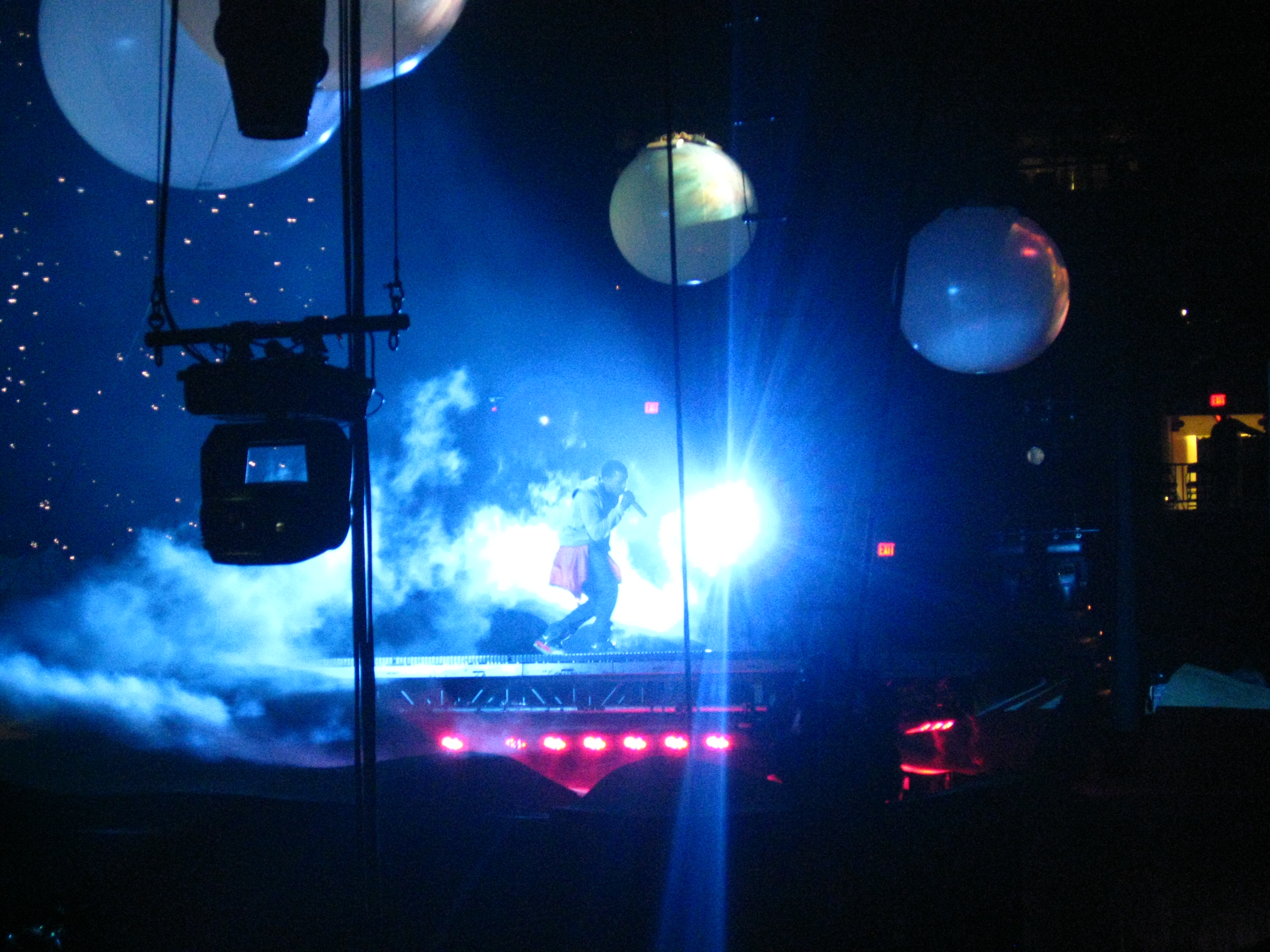
West is shown on a desolate planet of dry ice during the tour, surrounded by colored lights and rising smoke. He is accompanied by a space skyline, including moons and bursting stars.

For the concept of the Glow in the Dark Tour's concerts, a space opera theme was used. West came from an elevated platform that transformed into a spaceship named Jane that he piloted, embarking on a mission to "bring creativity back to earth". He traveled through the universe in his spaceship as smoke and flashing lights follow, before becoming marooned and hitting a meteor storm. The spaceship crash lands on an unknown planet covered by dry ice, alongside colored lights and swelling smoke in the landscape. Jane woke West up and informed him this was not his first crash, leading into the rapper performing songs from his first three albums The College Dropout (2004), Late Registration (2005), and Graduation (2007). West reviewed his weaknesses and tried to escape by finding his way home to Earth, after which Jane's computerized voice told him that he is needed as "the brightest star in the universe" and he performed "Stronger". The music was also used for the story of him seeking love, knowledge, and recognition. West's music was re-arranged by his tour band to sound melancholy rather than victorious, incorporating drumbeats and reverberated minor chords. These were succeeded by pop hooks, with the accompaniment of vocoders and synths. He rapped for an hour and a half uninterrupted as he played a hero under a skyline dominated by asteroids, whirling clouds, bursting stars, and moonscapes, failing to break out to connect with others. For the second half of the November 2008 concert at The O2 Arena, West moved away from the space theme into freestyling about venturing to heaven and if his sacrifices for fame were truly worth it. Towards the end of his concerts, Kanye would perform "Hey Mama" in tribute to Donda as he became emotional. The rapper sought power at the end and asked Jane where to "get more power", to which she replied he would be needed for the power and he also briefly performed Journey's 1981 single "Don't Stop Believin'". West appeared with Lupe Fiasco for his encore at the concert in New York City's Madison Square Garden, making his return home.

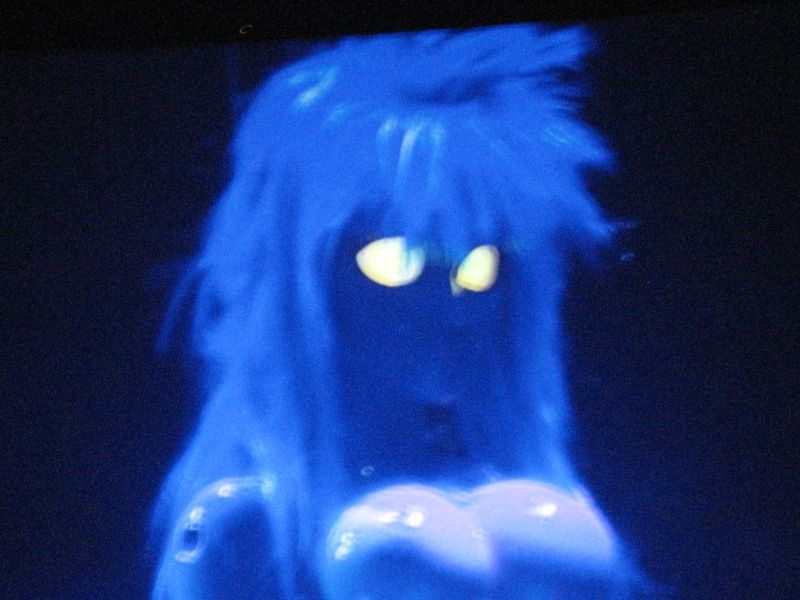
West was accompanied by the prop of a female alien on the tour, pictured above from his concert at the Pepsi Center in Denver, Colorado. The alien had glowing eyes and a blue wig that Chris Willman of Entertainment Weekly compared to a sex doll.

West deployed a minimalist stage set-up for the tour, appearing alone besides his backup singers and 10–piece live pit band who wore body armour as they played in the dark. The rapper rocked a sci-fi outfit that consisted of glowing accessories, dark jeans, a leather jacket, shoulder pad control panels, gloves, and his signature shutter shades. He mostly paced around on set, while certain points saw him kneel down, drop the microphone, and grind across the stage. Light sequences were deployed for the shows, with a purple light beam at the beginning and pyrotechnics featured later. West was backed by a LED screen that featured star fields, including shooting stars. Landscapes were brought on the screen, incorporating deserts and a giant moon. Video footage was shown of fireworks, explosions, and sunsets, which had the colors of neon pink, purple, and orange. Aliens appeared in floating bubbles, including a moving robot and a female monster who was suspended from wires, wearing a blue wig with her glowing eyes. During "Gold Digger", women covered in gold paint were shown on the screen.

== Marketing ==
Using two blog posts in January 2008, West revealed the poster for the Glow in the Dark Tour. The first post was titled "Get Ready!" and simply featured portions of a digitally enhanced tour poster, while the second one was named "The End of the World as You Know It!!!" and depicted West as a multi-color robot in the poster's full frame. West collaborated with Japanese artist Takashi Murakami on the tour's merchandise and it was also made by Virgil Abloh, marking one of his first projects with the rapper. At merchandise stands, $10 plastic replicas of West's shades were available.

In February 2008, West made a sponsorship deal with Absolut Vodka for the tour's US stint, dubbed "The Glow in the Dark Tour Ignited by Absolut 100". The deal was part of the brand's "In an Absolut World" campaign, with them sponsoring after-parties in each city where the rapper performed. West issued a statement honoring how Absolut had collaborated with "the pre-eminent artists of the 20th century", including his inspirations Andy Warhol, Tom Ford, Keith Haring, and Helmut Newton. In July 2008, West and Absolut shared a comedic one-minute commercial entitled "Be Kanye" to bekanyenow.com. Produced by TBWA/Chiat/Day, the video is set in a 1980s retro format with loud colors and humorous sound effects. West promotes the "Be Kanye" tablets that give users the "famous superstar power" to be him for four hours and he asks how often they have told themselves, "I feel famous and powerful on the inside, but nobody sees it that way on the outside?" A person also onlooks in confusion as a man in a club takes one and transforms into West while the rapper himself exits a bathroom stall; the ending shows a toll-free number for orders and the price of $19.95. A spokeswoman for Absolut said that their logo is shown once in the commercial on purpose for their audience to have their own experience rather than "telling them what it is", while they had the intention of capturing those spending more time online and consuming news media. The tablets were also advertised on bus stops, subways, and websites. In April 2018, West shared a trailer of his unreleased Tobias Spellman–directed documentary What Doesn't Kill Me that showed backstage scenes of him and his team on the tour. Although there was no reason disclosed for the lack of a release, the documentary has rarely been mentioned and this indicated the reason of it being done secretly.

== Reception and legacy ==
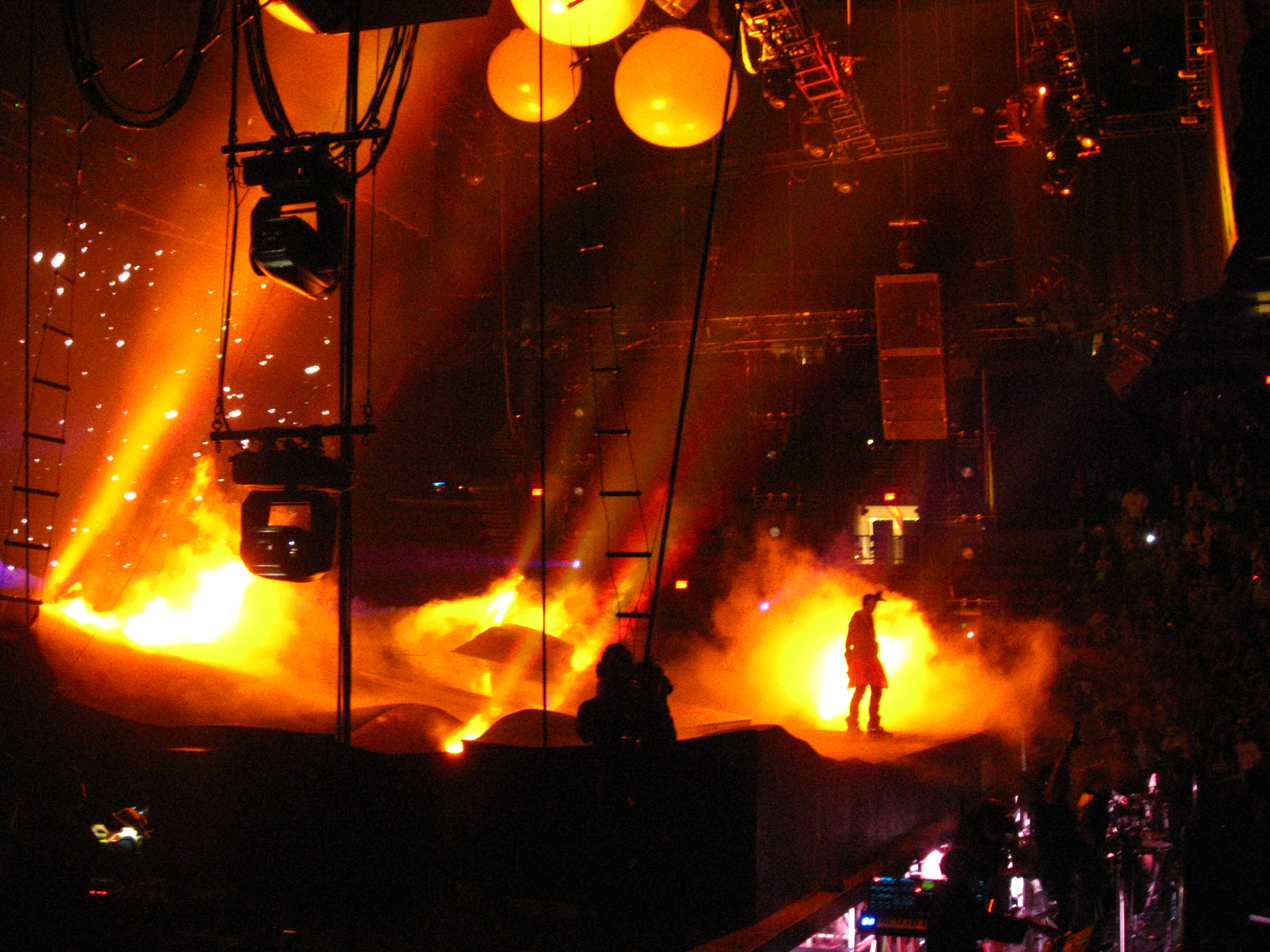
Reviewers lauded the space theme of the tour, which included shooting stars.

The Glow in the Dark Tour was met with generally positive reviews from critics. Richard Clayton of the Financial Times wrote that the set for the tour's first UK date resembled "a Star Trek set designed for the Pet Shop Boys", featuring violinists next to sleek white pyramids and a band with body armour who looked like riot police. They were also taken aback by West's costume invoking Wesley Snipes's look in Blade (1998), although felt that the progressive rap beats "grew samey and portentous" at the challenge of running through a stadium show and concluded if West had missed "his supernova ambitions, he made a rocket-fuelled attempt". Writing for The New York Times, Jon Pareles saw the tour's New York stop as hip-hop's "most daring arena spectacle" and partially its best with West's rapping, the beats, and "the narcissism". Pareles highlighted its sci-fi theme and the momentum of West's stamina mixed with his lone self-determination, while he felt that he pushes hip-hop's boundaries alongside the support acts, despite the music's "less triumphal and more melancholy" rearrangements being held back by the concert's instrumentation. Patrick MacDonald from The Seattle Times thought that West met his promise of being the greatest hip-hop star in Seattle on the tour's first US stop with "a magnificent, thrilling, uplifting, sensory experience" not done for any artist's concerts before. He lauded West's new visions for the show's design and message through his tall set, invoking "the uneven surface of another world" with a spaceship-like elevated platform. MacDonald finalized that West comes back to Earth "with the hard-won wisdom that life is a gift and every day a miracle", accompanied by three of hip-hop's most talented and versatile acts that gave strong performances.

Reviewing the show for the Los Angeles Times, Ann Powers called it West's space opera version of Gotterdammerung (1876) and saw obvious references to anime, Will Smith in the 2007 film I Am Legend, and IMAX shows about planets. He wrote that West continues his hero character by confronting terror, doubt, and "filial grief" to carry his braggadocio "into the realm of myth itself" with images that "saturated the stage floor" while escaping their boundaries. Powers believed the innovative imagery elevated the standard for tours to the highest since U2's 1992–93 Zoo TV Tour with their comic book style, while he hailed West's independence as a performer for wandering vast stages on his own. To conclude, Powers said that the impressive backdrops brought excitement beyond the rapper's performances for the first time on his tours and his "romantic power" as a hero, further noting the support acts have his "forward-thinking attitude about hip-hop, as well as his showiness". At the Seattle Post-Intelligencer, Travis Nichols pointed to the concert as West's self-love fest primarily focused on him, a reputation he has even within "the narcissistic echo chambers of hip-hop". He said the rapper "got wide berth" and his impressive effort felt like "watching Kobe Bryant pour in 64 points just so the Lakers could lose by two", although he highlighted the space narrative and West's artistry through both his musicality and stage setting.

After 49 concerts, the Glow in the Dark Tour grossed $30.8 million from 507,853 fans, standing as the third highest-grossing hip-hop tour of 2008. In retrospect, Corbin Reiff of Rolling Stone described the tour as a "case study in sensory overload". On October 9, 2009, West announced Australian photographer Nabil Elderkin's book Glow in the Dark that was designed by graphic team Base and chronicles the tour's events. The rapper blogged fondly of Elderkin's documentation of his experiences and felt emotional touring, although his pain "brought my greatest creation to date". Elderkin said that West was enthusiastic for him to join the project and found the musical score with his sets to be "a bold move", offering to also focus on the rapper as a person. The book includes West's sketches, photos of his performances, and behind-the-scenes shots, with a bonus CD that features live instrumentals.

== Tour controversies ==
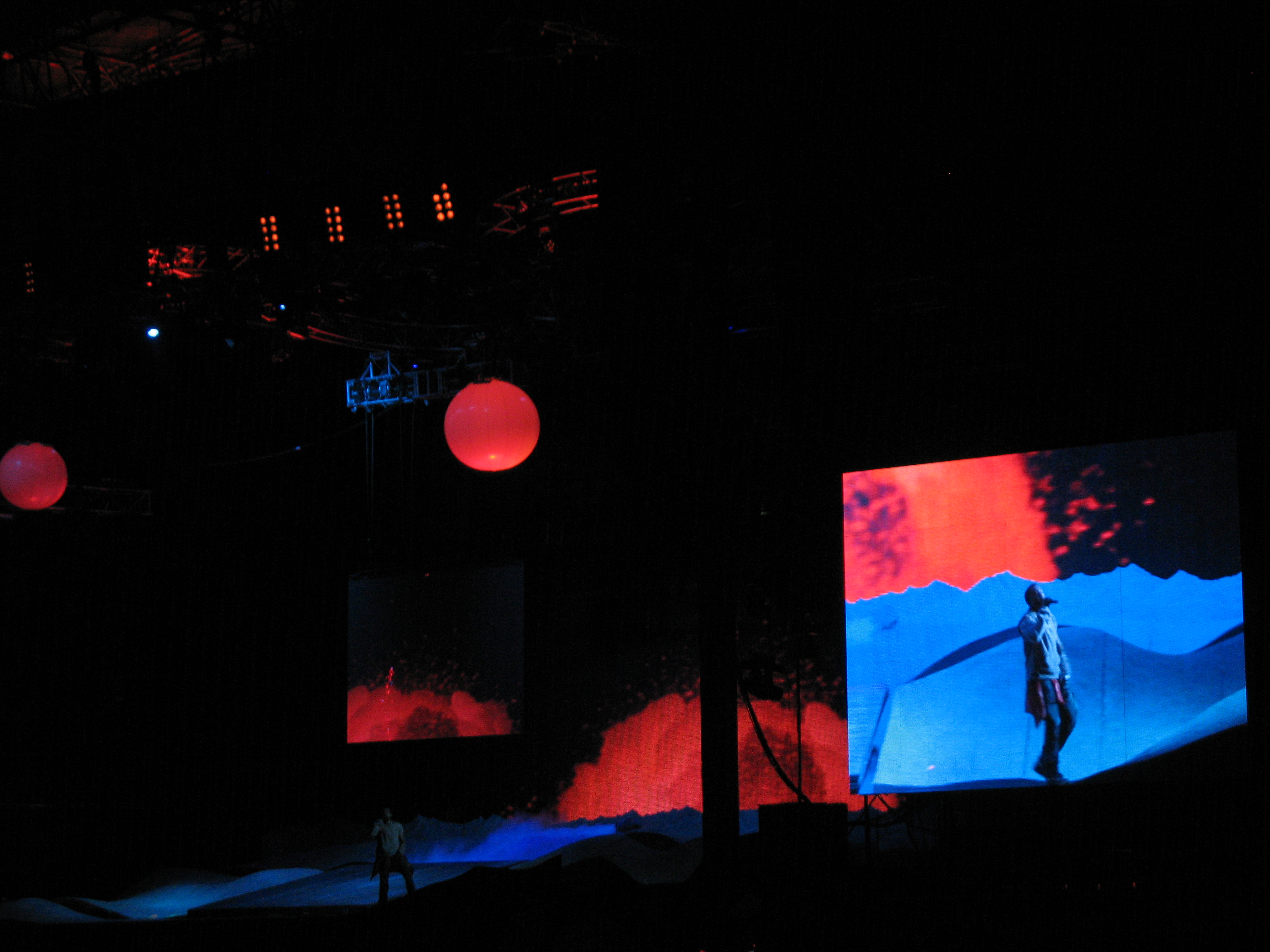
West delivering his light show performance at the 2008 Bonnaroo Music Festival, a spectacle that pushed his set back and it was delayed further from the previous act exceeding their timeslot

During a concert at ARCO Arena in Sacramento on April 18, 2008, West accidentally referred to the city as his previous touring city Seattle. West quickly apologized for the mistake over his blog and admitted he realized the wrong city had been named after the lack of a crowd response, succeeding this by mumbling his words. The rapper expressed his embarrassment at the mistake, offering no excuse. West's scheduled performance at the 2008 Bonnaroo Music Festival was changed to a late night set to accommodate the light show for the Glow in the Dark Tour, marking the first time this had been done on the main stage in Bonnaroo's seven-year history. The preceding act Pearl Jam ended up playing an hour over their allotted festival time, leaving less time for the setup of his stage props. The crowd became impatient and began to yell "Kanye Sucks"; a message on the monitors stated that his show would start at 3:30 a.m., although he came on stage at 4:25 a.m. and also finished the concert early. The crowd reacted negatively to West and threw glowsticks at him, while "Fuck Kanye" was graffitied across toilets.

Shortly after the Bonnaroo Festival, West expressed on his blog how offended he was by the treatment of the festival's management. West said that people can insult him as much as they want, yet can not doubt that he tried his hardest and he ridiculed the festival giving him a daytime slot for the tour's light show. The festival organizers also issued a statement that they had continuously succeeded at presenting "hundreds of the top artists in the world", with an aim of accommodating every performer's needs. West appeared at the 2014 Bonnaroo Music Festival after the previous controversial set, which he addressed when performing "Heartless" as he mentioned "I did Bonnaroo six months after my mom passed".

Following West's concert at the Newcastle Arena on November 13, 2008, he was arrested on suspicion of assault at Newcastle upon Tyne's Tup Tup Palace. A spokesman for the nightclub said that West was a guest from 1 a.m. to 2 a.m. and booked the entire VIP area; he was subsequently released without charge. The rapper ranted on his blog against the paparazzi after the incident as he decried "the monster" they made him out to be and expressed that there should be a law of asking to photograph someone, citing how "the paps killed Princess Diana".

== Set list ==
The below set list was performed by West throughout the Glow in the Dark Tour. West often covered a portion of Journey's "Don't Stop Believin'" towards the end of his concerts. He would also incorporate work from his fourth album 808s & Heartbreak during the last legs in 2008, including the lead single "Love Lockdown".

1. "Good Morning"
2. "I Wonder"
3. "Heard 'Em Say"
4. "Through the Wire"
5. "Champion"
6. "Get Em High"
7. "Diamonds from Sierra Leone"
8. "Can't Tell Me Nothing"
9. "Flashing Lights"
10. "Spaceship"
11. "All Falls Down"
12. "Gold Digger"
13. "Good Life"
14. "Jesus Walks"
15. "Hey Mama"
16. "Stronger"
17. "Homecoming"
18. "Touch the Sky"

== Tour dates ==
List of 2007 concerts
Date (2007)	City	Country	Venue
November 22	London	England	The O2 Arena (Note: The show was supposed to take place for two nights at Hammersmith Apollo, until it was changed to one night at The O2 Arena.)
November 24	Brighton	England	Brighton Centre
November 25	Bournemouth	England	BIC
November 26	Nottingham	England	Nottingham Arena
December 21	Cardiff	Wales	Cardiff International Arena
December 26	Plymouth	England	Plymouth Pavilions

List of 2008 concerts
Date (2008)	City	Country	Venue
April 16	Seattle	United States	KeyArena
April 18	Sacramento	United States	ARCO Arena
April 19	San Jose	United States	HP Pavilion at San Jose
April 20	San Diego	United States	San Diego Sports Arena
April 21	Los Angeles	United States	Nokia Theatre
April 22	Los Angeles	United States	Nokia Theatre
April 24	Tucson	United States	McKale Center
April 25 (Note: Rihanna was absent from this show.)	Las Vegas	United States	Red Rock Casino
April 26	Albuquerque	United States	ABQ Journal Pavilion
April 27	Denver	United States	Pepsi Center
April 29	Oklahoma City	United States	Ford Center
April 30	Austin	United States	Frank Erwin Center
May 1	Dallas	United States	SuperPages.com Center
May 2	The Woodlands	United States	Cynthia Woods Mitchell Pavilion
May 4	Duluth	United States	The Arena Gwinnett Center
May 5	Tampa	United States	Ford Amphitheatre
May 6	Miami	United States	American Airlines Arena
May 8	Charlotte	United States	Time Warner Cable Arena
May 9	Raleigh	United States	Time Warner Cable Music Pavilion
May 10	Bristow	United States	Nissan Pavilion at Stone Ridge
May 11	Virginia Beach	United States	Verizon Wireless Amphitheatre at Virginia Beach
May 13	New York City	United States	Madison Square Garden
May 15	Mansfield	United States	Tweeter Center
May 16	Hartford	United States	New England Dodge Music Center
May 17	Camden	United States	Susquehanna Bank Center
May 18	Scranton	United States	Toyota Pavilion
May 20	Montreal	Canada	Bell Centre
May 21	Toronto	Canada	Molson Amphitheatre
May 22	Auburn Hills	United States	The Palace of Auburn Hills
May 23	Chicago	United States	United Center
May 24	Chicago	United States	United Center
May 25	Fargo	United States	Fargodome
May 26	Winnipeg	Canada	MTS Centre
May 27	Saskatoon	Canada	Credit Union Centre
May 29	Edmonton	Canada	Rexall Place
May 30	Calgary	Canada	Saddledome
June 2	Vancouver	Canada	General Motors Place
June 3	Portland	United States	Rose Garden
June 5	Reno	United States	Reno Events Center
June 6	San Jose	United States	HP Pavilion at San Jose
June 7	Los Angeles	United States	Staples Center
June 8	Glendale	United States	Jobing.com Arena
June 9	West Valley City	United States	E Center
June 11	Minneapolis	United States	Target Center
June 12	Moline	United States	iWireless Center
June 14	Manchester	United States	Bonnaroo Music Festival
July 4	New Orleans	United States	Essence Festival
July 25	Stratford-upon-Avon	England	Global Gathering Festival
August 1	Cincinnati	United States	U.S. Bank Arena
August 3	Chicago	United States	Lollapalooza Festival
August 5	New York City	United States	Madison Square Garden
August 6	New York City	United States	Madison Square Garden
August 7	Ledyard	United States	MGM Grand at Foxwoods
August 10	Baltimore	United States	Pimlico Race Course (Note: Held for the Virgin Mobile Festival)
October 17	Mexico City	Mexico	Palacio de los Deportes
October 18	Monterrey	Mexico	Arena Monterrey
October 22	São Paulo	Brazil	Ginásio do Ibirapuera
October 24	Rio de Janeiro	Brazil	Marina da Glória
October 29	Singapore		Singapore Indoor Stadium
November 1	Beijing	China	Workers Indoor Arena
November 3	Shanghai	China	Shanghai Indoor Stadium
November 8	Belfast	Northern Ireland	Odyssey Place
November 9	Dublin	Ireland	RDS Simmonscourt
November 11	London	England	The O2 Arena
November 12	London	England	The O2 Arena
November 13	Newcastle	England	Newcastle Arena
November 15	Birmingham	England	NEC Arena
November 16	Glasgow	Scotland	SEC Centre
November 17	Manchester	England	MEN Arena
November 28	Hamburg	Germany	Color Line Arena
December 1	Auckland	New Zealand	Vector Arena
December 2	Wellington	New Zealand	TSB Arena
December 5	Melbourne	Australia	Rod Laver Arena
December 6	Sydney	Australia	Acer Arena
December 7	Brisbane	Australia	Brisbane Entertainment Centre

== See also ==
- Glow in the Dark (book)
