= I Got The... =

1975 song by Labi Siffre

Single by Labi Siffre

from the album Remember My Song
- B-side: "The Vulture"
- Released: 1975 (as album track); 2003 (as single)
- Genre: Soul; funk
- Length: 6:36 (full version); 3:51 (radio edit)
- Label: Pye (album release); Stateside (single release)
- Songwriter: Labi Siffre
- Producers: Big Jim Sullivan; Derek Lawrence

Labi Siffre singles chronology
"City of Dreams" (1991)	"I Got The..." (1975)	"Love Is Love Is Love" (2020)

"I Got The..." is a song by British musician Labi Siffre, originally released in 1975 as the opening track on his album Remember My Song.

The song resurged in popularity in 1999 when it was sampled by American producer Dr. Dre for American rapper Eminem's breakthrough hit "My Name Is", leading to its release as a single in 2003.

== Composition and recording ==
As with the other tracks on Remember My Song, "I Got The..." was written by Siffre and produced by Big Jim Sullivan and Derek Lawrence. The recording featured session musicians Chas Hodges on guitar and Dave Peacock on bass guitar, who later became notable in their own right as Chas & Dave.

== Legacy ==
=== Sampling ===
In 1999, a bass and electric piano riff from "I Got The..." was sampled by the American rappers Eminem and Dr. Dre for Eminem's song "My Name Is", which became his breakthrough hit.

Siffre, who is gay, said in an interview that he refused permission for the sample until the sexist and homophobic lyrics were removed from "My Name Is":

"Dissing the victims of bigotry – women as bitches, homosexuals as faggots – is lazy writing. Diss the bigots not their victims."

He eventually allowed the sample when he was sent a censored "clean" version, though the "dirty" version continues to use the lyrics that he objected to.

"I Got The..." was also sampled on Jay-Z's "Streets Is Watching" from his 1997 album In My Lifetime, Vol. 1.

=== In popular culture ===
"I Got The..." appeared in the 2020 Better Call Saul episode "Bagman".

== Personnel ==
According to Somehow Jazz:

- Labi Siffre – electric piano, lead and backing vocals, songwriter
- Chas Hodges – electric guitar, backing vocals
- Dave Peacock – bass guitar, backing vocals
- Ian Wallace – drums
- Big Jim Sullivan – lead guitar, arranger, producer
- Derek Lawrence – producer
- Alan Branscombe – percussion
- The Dean Street Brass – horns
- The Rock and Roll Gypsies – strings
- Gordon Neville – backing vocals
- Jacqui Sullivan – backing vocals
