= Cannock Chase (disambiguation) =

Cannock Chase is an area in Staffordshire, England.

Cannock Chase may also refer to:

- Cannock Chase District
- Cannock Chase (constituency)
- "Cannock Chase", a song by Labi Siffre from his album Crying Laughing Loving Lying
