= Alan Branscombe =

English jazz musician (1936–1986)

- Born: Alan Branscombe; 4 June 1936; Wallasey, England
- Died: 27 October 1986 (aged 50) London, England
- Genre: Jazz
- Occupation: Musician
- Instruments: Piano; Vibraphone; Alto saxophone
- Years active: 1954–1986

Alan Branscombe (4 June 1936 – 27 October 1986) was an English jazz pianist, vibraphonist, and alto saxophonist.

== Early life ==
Branscombe was born in Wallasey, Cheshire (now Merseyside), in 1936. His father and grandfather were also professional musicians. He played drums with Victor Feldman in a talent show as a child. He began on alto sax at age six, and played in the army with Jeff Clyne in 1954–1956.

== Career ==
Branscombe toured and recorded with Vic Ash in 1958, recorded with Tony Kinsey in 1959, and toured Japan with Stanley Black in 1960. He worked with John Dankworth as pianist and vibraphonist intermittently between 1960 and 1972, including in the 1963 film The Servant. He joined Harry South's band at Ronnie Scott's club in the mid-1960s, and played as a sideman with Tubby Hayes (1964), Stan Tracey (1966–1968), Paul Gonsalves (1969), Ben Webster (1965, 1970), and Albert Nicholas (1973). Branscombe toured in Europe with Stan Getz in 1970, and played with the Lamb-Premru group around 1971.

Branscombe also recorded as a leader with Tony Kinsey and Tony Coe as sidemen on the album The Day I Met the Blues (EMI, 1977).

As a session musician, Branscombe played tenor saxophone on the Beatles song "Got to Get You into My Life".

== Discography ==
=== As leader ===
- The Day I Met the Blues (EMI, 1977)

=== As sideman ===
With John Dankworth

- What the Dickens! (Fontana, 1963)
- Shakespeare and All That Jazz (Fontana, 1964)
- The Zodiac Variations (Fontana, 1965)
- The $1,000,000 Collection (Fontana 1967)
- Full Circle (Philips, 1972)

With Georgie Fame

- Sound Venture (Columbia 1966)
- The Two Faces of Fame (CBS 1967)

With Don Harper

- Homo Electronicus (Columbia 1974)
- On the Fiddle (Polydor, 1975)
- Combo: Duo, Trio, Quartet, Sextet (1978)

With Tubby Hayes

- Tubbs' Tours (Mole Jazz, 1981)
- England's Late Jazz Great (IAJRC, 1987)
- 200% Proof (Master Mix, 1992)

With Harold McNair

- Affectionate (1965)
- The Fence (1970)

With Ben Webster

- Webster's Dictionary (Philips, 1970)
- In a Mellow Tone (Magnum, 1995)

With Kenny Wheeler

- Windmill Tilter (Fontana, 1969)
- Song for Someone (Incus, 1973)

With others

- Neil Ardley, A Symphony of Amaranths (Regal Zonophone, 1972)
- Lionel Bart, Isn't This Where We Came In? (Deram, 1968)
- George Chisholm, George Chisholm (Gold Star, 1974)
- Roger Cook, Meanwhile Back at the World (Regal Zonophone 1972)
- Elaine Delmar, Elaine Delmar and Friends (Polydor, 1980)
- Paul Gonsalves, Humming Bird (Deram, 1970)
- Ted Heath, Big Band Themes Remembered Vol. II (Decca, 1974)
- Jackie Lomax, Is This What You Want? (Apple, 1969)
- Don Lusher, Lusher & Lusher & Lusher (1973)
- Albert Nicholas, Let Me Tell You (EMI, 1974)
- Ken Rattenbury Featuring Shirley Franklin and David Stevens, Storytime (EMI, 1965)
- Johnny Scott, London Swings (Columbia, 1966)
- Labi Siffre, Remember My Song (EMI, 1975)
- Jimmy Skidmore, Skid Marks (Silverline, 1972)
- Dakota Staton, Dakota '67 (London, 1967)
- Stan Tracey, The Latin-American Caper (Columbia, 1969)
- John Williams, The Height Below (Cube, 1973)
