= The Singer and the Song =

Studio album by Labi Siffre
- Released: 1971
- Genre: Folk-pop
- Length: 35:30; 51:27 (Bonus tracks)
- Label: Pye International
- Producers: Ian Green; Labi Siffre

Labi Siffre chronology
Labi Siffre (1970)	The Singer and the Song (1971)	Crying Laughing Loving Lying (1972)

The Singer and the Song is the second studio album by English singer-songwriter Labi Siffre, released in 1971, by Pye International.

All songs written and performed by Labi Siffre. Musical Directors were Gordon Beck and John Bell. The album was recorded at Chappell Studios and IBC Studios and was produced by Labi Siffre and Ian Green.

The re-mastered album was released on CD in 2006 by EMI featuring 6 bonus tracks and liner notes by Labi Siffre.

== Track listing ==
All tracks are written by Labi Siffre.

Side 1
No.	Title	Length
1.	"There's Nothing in the World Like Love"	3:58
2.	"You're Lovely"	0:32
3.	"A Number of Words"	2:34
4.	"Who Do You See"	3:04
5.	"Not So Long Ago"	2:05
6.	"The Shadow of Our Love"	3:35
7.	"When I'm On My Own You Are On My Mind"	1:25

Side 2
No.	Title	Length
8.	"Rocking Chair"	2:28
9.	"Interlude"	3:06
10.	"Thank Your Lucky Star"	3:02
11.	"Talk About"	2:42
12.	"Relax"	2:36
13.	"Bless The Telephone"	1:41
14.	"Summer Is Coming"	3:13
15.	"Goodbye"	0:44
Total length:		35:30

Bonus tracks on 2006 CD Reissue
No.	Title	Length
1.	"Get to the Country"	3:01
2.	"Till Nighttime Comes Along"	3:35
3.	"Fallin' for You"	2:39
4.	"Oh What a Day"	2:25
5.	"Just a Face"	2:06
6.	"Seasons Come, Seasons Go"	2:11
Total length:		51:27

== Personnel ==
- Labi Siffre - Vocals, backing vocals, 12-string acoustic guitar, 6-string acoustic guitar, kazoo and piano on "There's Nothing in the World Like Love", production.
- Ian Green - production, mixing
