= I Wonder (Kanye West song) =

2007 song by Kanye West

Song by Kanye West

from the album Graduation
- Released: September 11, 2007
- Recorded: 2007
- Studio: Henson Recording; The Record Plant (Hollywood); Sony Music (NYC)
- Genre: Hip hop; R&B
- Length: 4:03
- Label: Roc-A-Fella; Def Jam
- Songwriters: Kanye West; Labi Siffre
- Producer: Kanye West

"I Wonder" is a song by American rapper Kanye West, released as the fourth track on his third studio album, Graduation (2007). The song was written and produced by him; Labi Siffre received a songwriting credit due to the sampling of his work. The song's composition was influenced by rock and electronic music. Composed by West as a variation of "City of Blinding Lights" by his tourmates, the Irish rock band U2, he set it to focus on the concerns of university graduates. A hip hop and R&B ballad with Eurodance and stadium rock elements, the song relies on a sample of "My Song" by Siffre. Its downbeat instrumentation has a distorted beat and is led by Larry Gold's orchestration, razorblade synths, and a drum kit.

In the lyrics of the song, West raps about the contrasting scenarios of him having achieved his dreams and other dream chasers still searching for theirs. "I Wonder" was met with critical acclaim, being lauded for its composition. Some praised West's vocals for his delivery and certain critics saw it as a highlight of Graduation. In 2023, the song reached number 88 on the Lithuania Top 100. It was also awarded triple platinum and platinum certifications in the United States and the United Kingdom by the Recording Industry Association of America and British Phonographic Industry, respectively.

An accompanying video clip was directed by Derrick Lee and screened during the album's session at New World Stages in August 2007, consisting of synced footage from the first installment of the Tron film franchise, Tron (1982). Despite abandoning his consideration of "I Wonder" as the fourth single from Graduation, West identified it among his three favorite songs from the album. West performed the song at the Global Gathering and Glastonbury festivals in 2008 and 2015, respectively. In 2017, Big Sean performed a cover version on the Live Lounge of BBC Radio 1Xtra with altered lyrics. A cult following has emerged for the song amongst West's fans and "I Wonder" has been credited with an impact on other musical acts.

== Background and development ==
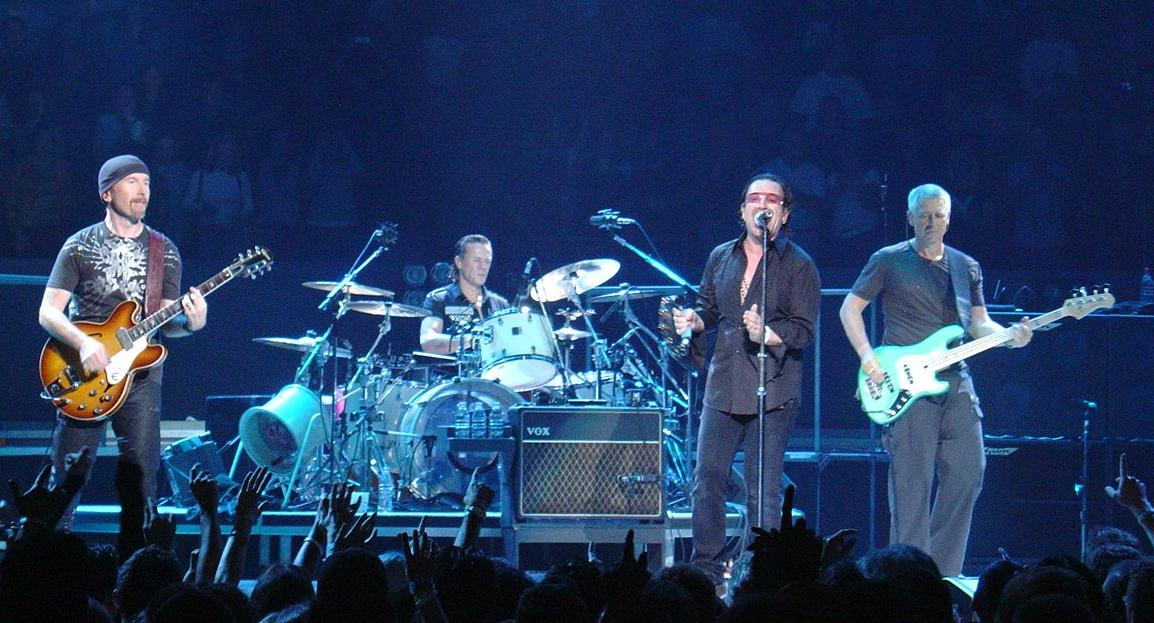
West set out to compose his version of "City of Blinding Lights" by U2 (pictured) after witnessing them perform it on their Vertigo Tour (2005–06).

"I Wonder" was written and produced solely by West. The experimental production of the song created a sound different from that of West's past work, incorporating influences from rock and electronic music. After witnessing Irish rock band U2 perform "City of Blinding Lights" as he joined them on their Vertigo Tour from 2005 to 2006, he sought out to compose rap songs that could operate similarly in live venues. He set out to create his variation of the single with "I Wonder", focusing on delivering his message in a slower flow with few words and sloganeering to be chanted in unison. Having also been accompanied by the Rolling Stones on tour and inspired by both the touring acts, West found that complex lyrics did not consistently generate reactions. He jokingly said that "this 50-year-old white lady" would be waiting for the band to appear as he delivered his "super raps". The song moves towards a melancholy style, including piano, winding keys, and a crashing beat.

"And I'm rapping "Diamonds" and stuff like that trying to over rap, and I was like you know what? I don't need to over rap and that's how you get a song like "I Wonder" [...] Like no rappers would really, you know, put it out like that, because people are trying to prove themselves all the time."

— West talking to Concrete Loop about rapping on "I Wonder", October 2007

West mentioned that the song focuses on the concerns of university graduates, echoing the title of Graduation. He explained that he offers the graduates a small amount of advice, posing the question of how they make their decisions and "letting them zone out to the music" to figure that out. Prior to the release of Graduation, West spoke of wanting to write songs that listeners could connect with. Throughout the album, West reconditioned his lines to be more simple, direct, and autobiographical in order to make them more accessible to listeners and appeal to the widest audience possible. The song's swelling, anthemic energy was the result of West's influences from the touring bands; West wished to attain a "stadium status" for his music. His lyrics talk about chasing after dreams and address his rise to fame. In a 2007 interview with Concrete Loop, West explained that he made a conscious effort not to overexert his rapping on Graduation, imparting that he felt he did so too often in the past. He instead "zoned out", entering the studio and feeling his words came from God as he focused on the beat of "I Wonder".

== Recording ==
The song features a sample of the 1972 recording "My Song" by British singer Labi Siffre, which led to him receiving a songwriting credit. The sample is combined with synths, which were inspired by "City of Blinding Lights". By placing the sample under this instrumentation, West caused it to sound as though it was trapped in a machine. He sampled directly from the song rather than altering the pitch, as he did with the other samples in the album. Synths appear on nearly every track of Graduation, which served as West's introduction to electronic music.

In an interview, West stated that one of his primary objectives on Graduation was for his drums to "bang harder in stadiums". His newfound interest in house music influenced his mission to achieve stronger drum beats. West relied less on his signature shuffling rhythmic patterns and placed more emphasis on clipped electro tones, strengthening the musicality of his programmed beats. The rhythm section of "I Wonder" is structured on a combination of West's drum kit and pounding breakbeats. Its snare drum was reportedly heard while he was shopping for furniture at Moss. West spent around 10 recording sessions working on the drum track across weeks.

Despite its experimental nature, "I Wonder" remains one of the few tracks from Graduation that harbor certain characteristics of West's former musical style. Speaking of the song retrospectively, fellow rapper Cyhi the Prynce described West as "very musical". The sample from Siffre's "My Song" is soulful, maintaining West's audience from his earlier style. Alongside the sample, the orchestration includes his familiar piano and strings. The track's keyboards were played by West collaborator Jon Brion, who delivered a full string section.

== Composition and lyrics ==
Musically, "I Wonder" is a hip hop and R&B ballad, with elements of Eurodance and stadium rock. The song contains a soulful, piano-led sample from "My Song" by Siffre. Vocals from the sample are used for the hook, posing the question: "And I wonder if you know what it means to find your dreams?" The sample is combined with razorblade crossover synths throughout, as well as breakbeats. Its downbeat instrumentation features a 10-piece orchestra arranged by Larry Gold. The orchestration consists of violin, viola, cello, bass, piano, and strings, accompanying the song's distorted beat. "I Wonder" features experimental production, with a stop-and-start arrangement accompanied by a melodic cadence and anthemic energy. The melodic cadence slows down, with West matching his rapping flow. Through sparse vocals and a staccato delivery, West delivers minimal verses in melancholia. Momentarily, West stops rapping and allows the instrumentation to wander indistinctly. The song features a lengthy introduction, which includes twinkling keyboards. Its bridge consists of snare and kick drums, led by the synths. Following the song's third verse that continues the kick drum, it enters a breakdown. The beat crashes, dominated by the strings until the song's conclusion.

"I Wonder"
A 21-second sample of West rapping the song's first verse. He performs lyrics slowly about chasing dreams through an staccato delivery and spare vocals, opening with a proclamation. His lines are followed by vocal samples of "My Song" by Labi Siffre, accompanied by musical distortion of synths and his orchestra's instruments.

Lyrically, "I Wonder" contains introspection from West regarding dream chasers. The rapper describes the struggles of other people in fulfilling their lives, who are still searching for their dreams. On the contrary, West acknowledges that he has achieved his own dreams as he raps about becoming involved with the contents of a blouse. The track opens with a proclamation from West: "I've been waiting for this moment my whole life." He touches on a difficult relationship in the first verse, utilizing a staggered delivery. On the third and final verse, West returns to his usual cadence once the relationship seemingly ends. He also offers a call-out to the women present, questioning how many have "no spouse" and rhyming the lyrics with "blouse." West moves away from the subject of others' struggles and delivers bravado.

Some music journalists commented on how the lyrical content compared to the aspirational theme of "I Wonder". To Hillary Crosley from Billboard, West places focus on inspiration: "I've been waiting on this my whole life/You can still be what you wish you is, that's what intuition is." However, Greg Kot of Chicago Tribune detected that the song has undertones of self-doubt: "And I wonder if you know what it all means?" Todd Williams from The Boombox remarked that West seems to be in disbelief of his accomplishments in his career and life. Jesal Padania for RapReviews declared that the song's lyricism loosely shows West's miscommunication with many people, while its "buzz-lines and Shakespearian open text" attract listeners: "Do you even remember what the issue is?"

== Release and promotion ==
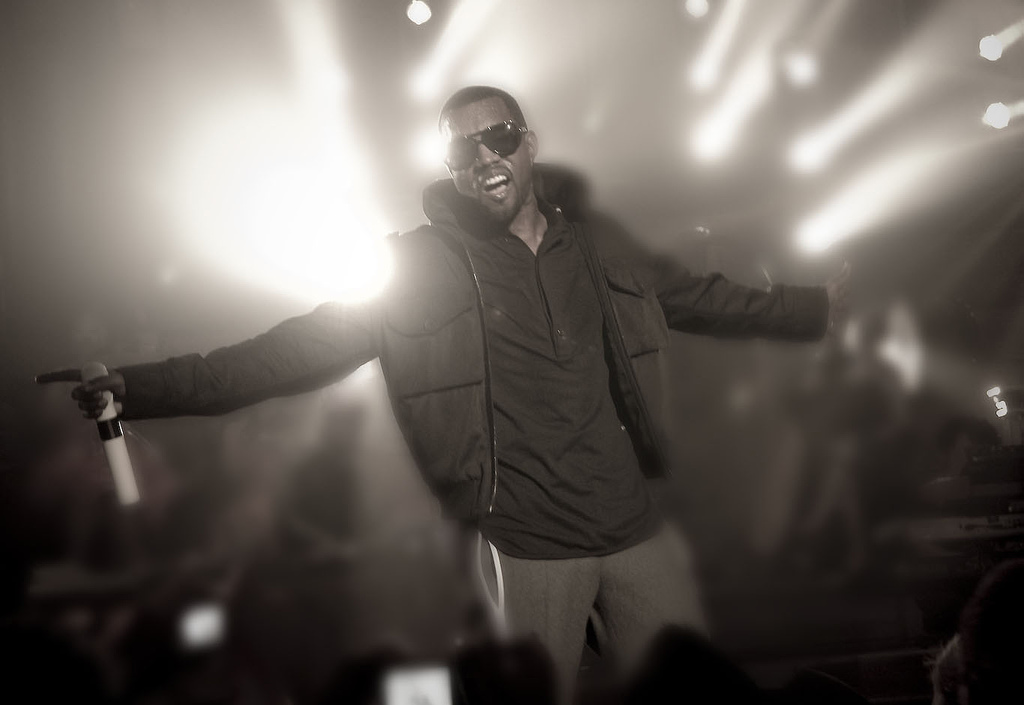
West at the Methodist Central Hall, Westminster on August 20, 2007, where he first performed "I Wonder" in secret.

"I Wonder" was first previewed when the digital radio station BBC Radio 1Xtra hosted an "Audience With Kanye West" event at the BBC Radio Music Theatre in London on August 13, 2007. West guided a specially selected audience through Graduation, playing the album on his MacBook Air laptop via a speaker system. West first performed "I Wonder" live during a secret show with Barbadian singer Rihanna at the Methodist Central Hall in the City of Westminster on August 20, 2007. The show was held to 500 fans and invited guests, who were mostly competition winners and music industry insiders. Initially, the guests were greeted with graduation outfits and mortarboards in reference to the album's title.

"I Wonder" was one of the tracks that West played during a listening session for Graduation at the New World Stages in Manhattan, New York on August 28, 2007, accompanied by a video clip. Inside an auditorium, West revealed his influences and aspirations. West played the songs from start-to-finish uninterrupted, with special programs of the lyrics handed out. He mentioned that the song served as his version of U2's "City of Blinding Lights" and how he simplified his lyrics to generate reactions from audiences. Despite originally being set to serve as the opener, "I Wonder" was ultimately released as the fourth track of Graduation on September 11, 2007. West imparted that the song was one of his three favorites from the album; he focused on its level of emotion and stadium feel, mentioning a favorite composition of his as Gold's strings in the breakdown. The rapper reportedly considered the track as an option for the record's fourth single following release, although he instead subsequently chose to release "Flashing Lights" in November 2007, another favorite that he saw as the album's "coolest" number.

== Reception ==
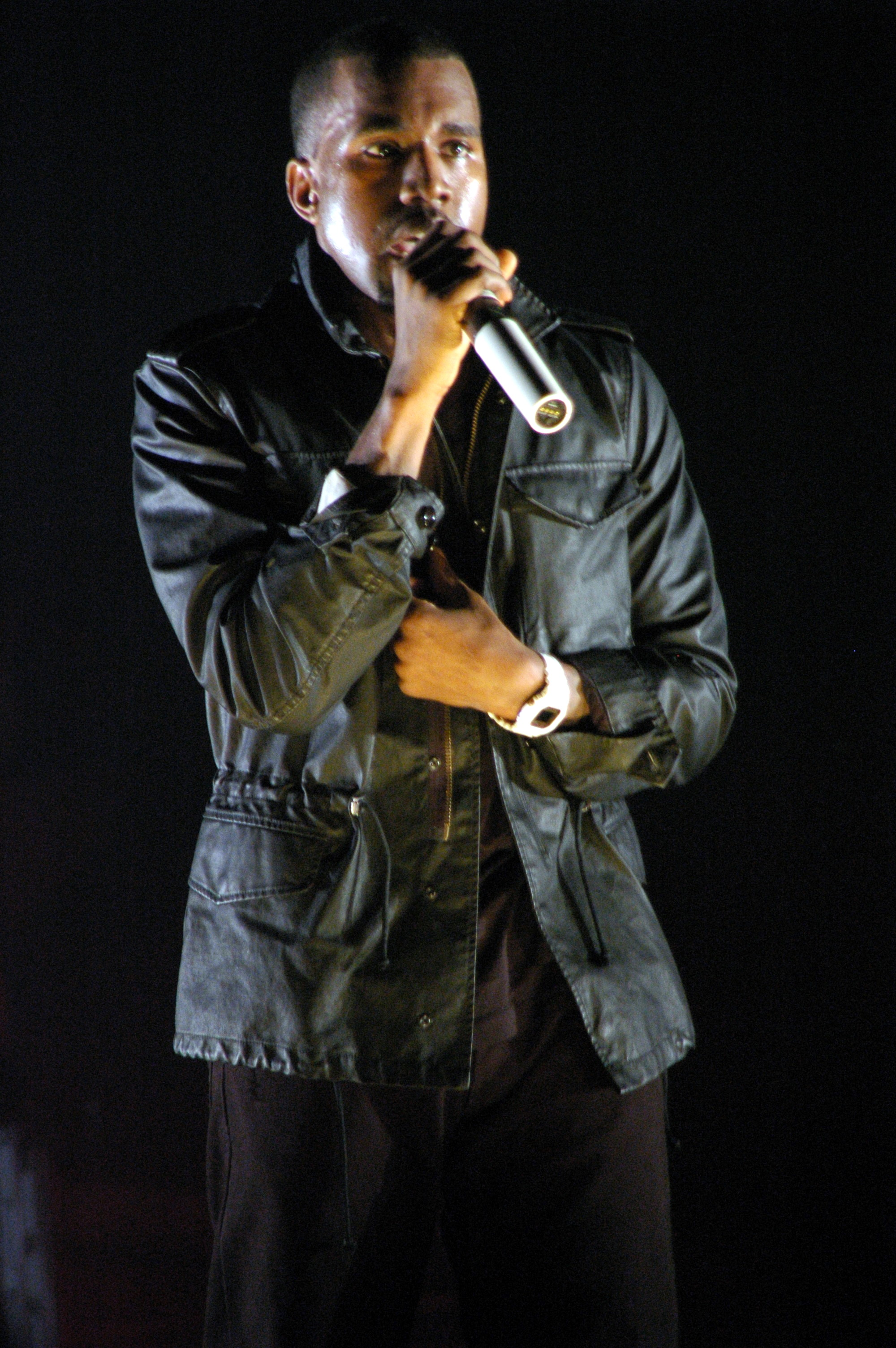
Numerous reviewers complimented West's vocals on the song, with the primary focus on his delivery and some also around his flow.

"I Wonder" was met with widespread acclaim from contemporary music critics, many of whom lauded the composition. In 2017, CraveOnline ranked "I Wonder" as one of West's 15 best songs and the staff felt surprised in the level of inspiration and motivation from "such a chopped off, aggressive flow," assuring it would "give you goose bumps". The staff wrote that West's tone is hard, despite the lack of his later work's darkness, and his signature "vocal-instrumental is illuminating as one can get ... it's certainly a hidden gem". Sharing similar sentiments, Pitchfork's Mark Pytlik and AllMusic's Andy Kellman both cited the song as one of the immediate highlights of the third album, with both lauding the sample of "My Song". Louis Pattison from NME assessed that West's musical influences of soul as well as synthesizers and electronic music, are shown on the track's "zig-zagging keyboards and crunchy Game Boy beats". Commenting on its bright keys and hiccuping breakbeats, Patrick D. McDermott of The Fader hailed the composition as the album's "most timeless artifact". Prefix Mag's Jesse Manne remarked that despite the song's melancholy standing out on Graduation, it boasts "a crashing beat and winding keys." Japie Stoppelenburg of No Ripcord was surprised by the song's replication of West's 2005 album Late Registration, highlighting how his typical strings and samples were combined with distortion and razorblade synths continued on fellow album track "Big Brother". In a review of Graduation, Greg Kot, a music critic for Chicago Tribune, stated that "I Wonder" served to bring West's early soul productions to the level of stadium rap.

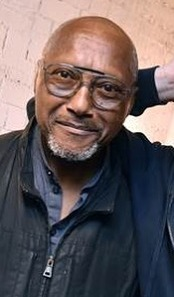
The sample of Siffre's "My Song" in the composition was often highlighted by critics, which stands among the numerous occasions he was sampled in hip hop.

Ross Bonaime of Paste magazine was fascinated with West's unconventional song structure of changing his stance around a difficult relationship across the verses, believing the structure overpowers the somewhat "insistent" sample. Kevin Jones opined for Exclaim! how through traditional samples, West "transforms more than a few gems" into the album's most captivating moments and the song's sample is the prime example, matching with "a bottom-heavy kick drum and keys exchange" that is followed by "string work of [the] legendary [...] Gold". At Contactmusic.com, Ben Davis noted that the song allows the sample to "sound positively alien". Writing for the Los Angeles Times, Ann Powers was intrigued by West's performance, saying that he approaches the soulful sample "like a punching bag" and the staccato delivery undermines his "Don Juan come-ons". Comparing it to "Flashing Lights", Alex Swhear from Uproxx described the track's "sparse vocals" as minimalist, while intimate and emotional. The Washington Post staff writer J. Freedom du Lac lists "I Wonder" as one of the four best tracks from Graduation.

Calling "I Wonder" a "stomping synth-soul track", the Chicago Reader writer Miles Raymer voiced his appreciation for West's songwriting progression that he blends with the sample. Likewise, Rajveer Kathwadia for RWD Magazine chose it as his favorite track on the album and called West's musicality on the track the true measurement of his talent that takes center stage, as well as stating that he had improved as a rapper. He also believed that West's "disjointed flow" and sexual lyrics failed to match his production. Rolling Stone music journalist Nathan Brackett opined that the "off-kilter, dreamlike" song demonstrates West's growth as a songwriter, even though he would never be equivalent to his mentor, Jay-Z. In a negative review, Nick Marx from Tiny Mix Tapes offered that "critics of Kanye's staggered half-rhymes will find ample fodder here," while identifying the synths resembling the Neptunes as the lowest point. Jake Boyer of Highsnobiety declared West's showcases of his lyricism as failing to create "the memorable slow-ballad" that "I Wonder" heavily attempts to be, finalizing that "things just aren't clicking into place" with the track and faulting its placement on the album in between two of the strongest pop-leaning singles.

On June 15, 2018, "I Wonder" was certified gold by the Recording Industry Association of America (RIAA) for reaching 500,000 certified units in the United States, becoming the first non-single from Graduation to receive a certification. The track later received a triple platinum certification from the RIAA for amassing 3,000,000 units in the US on December 4, 2023. On December 22, it was certified gold by the British Phonographic Industry (BPI) for shelving 400,000 units in the United Kingdom. Elsewhere in Europe, the track reached number 88 on the Lithuania Top 100 during 2023.

== Video clip ==
Prior to the release of Graduation, a special video clip was created for the track. It was displayed for the first time during the album's session at the New World Stages on August 28, 2007. The video clip for "I Wonder" was one of seven that were designed by West and Derrick Lee exclusively for the event. Lee was also the editor of the music video for "Flashing Lights" and was able to edit all seven clips in the span of three days.

West presented his session inside the auditorium with a light show across a stage that featured theatrical smoke machines, laser beams, stage spotlights, and other special effects. While the music played, a large screen positioned in the middle of the stage displayed footage of films edited to be in sync. The footage for "I Wonder" was taken from scenes of Tron (1982), one of the multiple science fiction films that West used. West made the video clip available for viewing via his blog on March 24, 2008; he posted one clip from the session every two days that month. In the blog entry, West stated that it may have been his favorite out of the clips.

== Live performances ==
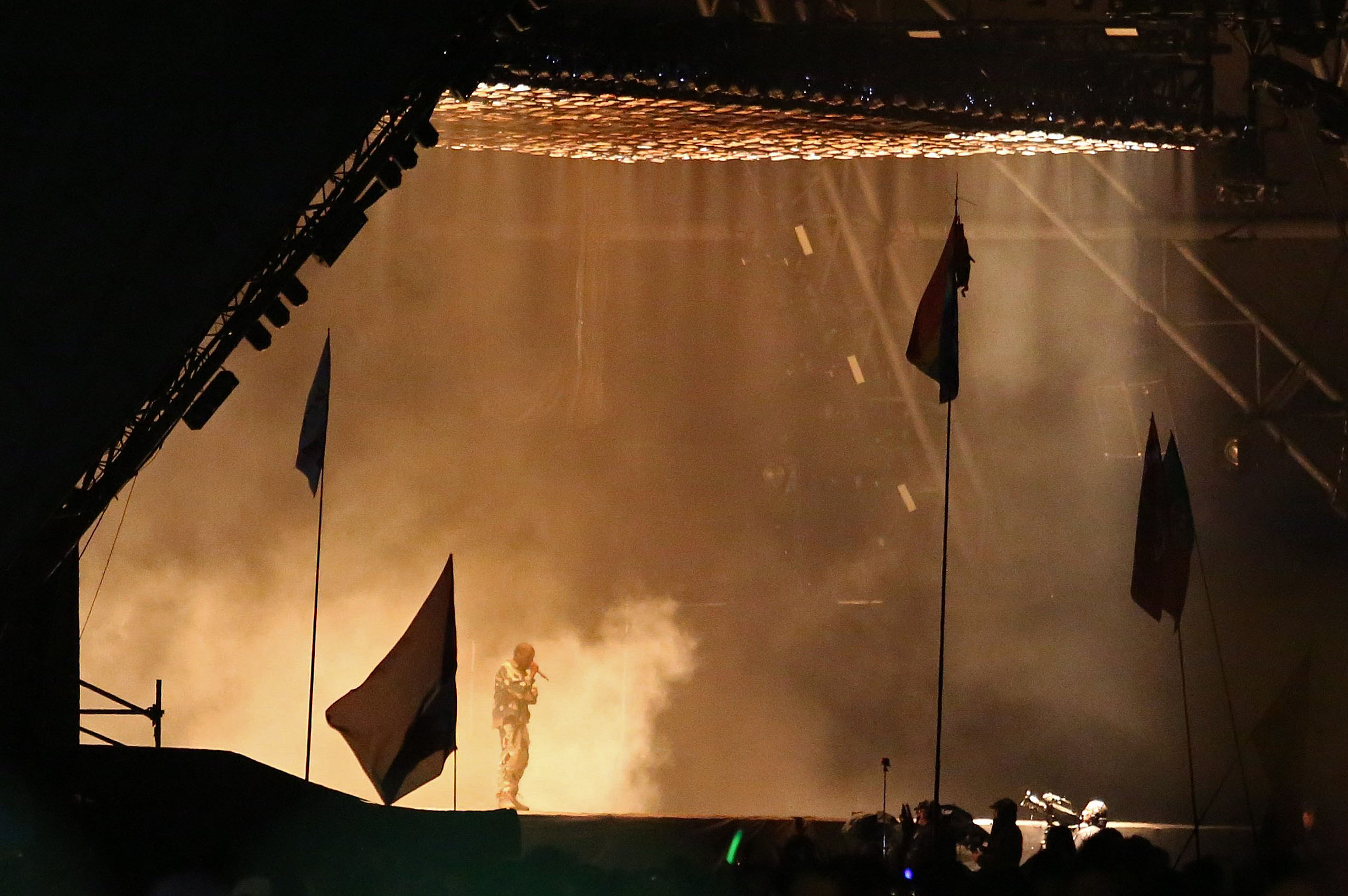
West performed "I Wonder" at the Glastonbury Festival, marking a rare song performance from him in 2015.

West performed "I Wonder" twice at his Methodist Central Hall secret show in August 2007, sponsored by Vodafone and Sony Mobile's series of one-off gigs across the UK. The first performance opened the show and West arrived late, wearing grey tracksuit bottoms, a black jacket, sun shades, and white trainers. He was accompanied by a string section, background vocalists, a keyboardist, and a DJ. The orchestra was made up of 21 women, who appeared as if they were wearing plastic dresses with their faces colored in with fluorescent face paint. West performed the track to open his charity foundation's benefit concert promoting and raising funds for higher education at Chicago's House of Blues on August 24, 2007, conducting his 16-piece band. One of the initiatives funded by the concert was the Loops Dreams Teacher Training Institute, which encourages the incorporation of hip hop into the Chicago Public Schools curriculum. For the performance, West wore an untucked white shirt, a purple cardigan, jeans, and sun shades. West abruptly paused mid-performance after a minute and exited stage as he left his band there, returning three minutes later to perform a string of tracks from his first two studio albums. He eventually restarted "I Wonder" and played a few chords on an upright piano at one point, an arrangement that Kot considered to feel under-rehearsed and "not as fully realized as [the] recorded version."

West included the track as the second number in the set list for his Glow in the Dark Tour, which began on April 16, 2008, at the KeyArena in Seattle, Washington. It is one of the tracks taken from his first three studio albums that served to form a space opera storyline, telling the tale of how a stranded space traveler struggles for over a year making attempts to escape from a distant planet while on a mission to bring creativity back to Earth. In the narrative, West appears as a traveler who crashes onto an unknown planet after talking with his robotic on-board computer, Jane. He then begins performing. The song was performed by West during his 90-minute headlining set for the annual dance music festival Global Gathering at Long Marston Airfield near Stratford-upon-Avon, Warwickshire, on July 25, 2008. West was accompanied by lighting and smoke effects, alongside backup singers. On October 20, 2013, West performed the song at the KeyArena for his kickoff show of The Yeezus Tour, although he stopped rapping a few times. West delivered a performance of "I Wonder" in a low tempo for his headlining set at the 2015 Glastonbury Festival, considered a rare song for him to perform at this time. On January 6, 2019, West's then-wife Kim Kardashian shared rehearsal footage of his gospel group the Sunday Service Choir performing the song to her Instagram Stories. Later that day, the group performed a rendition of the song as the fifth number of their first concert, beginning from around six minutes in.

== Appearances in media ==
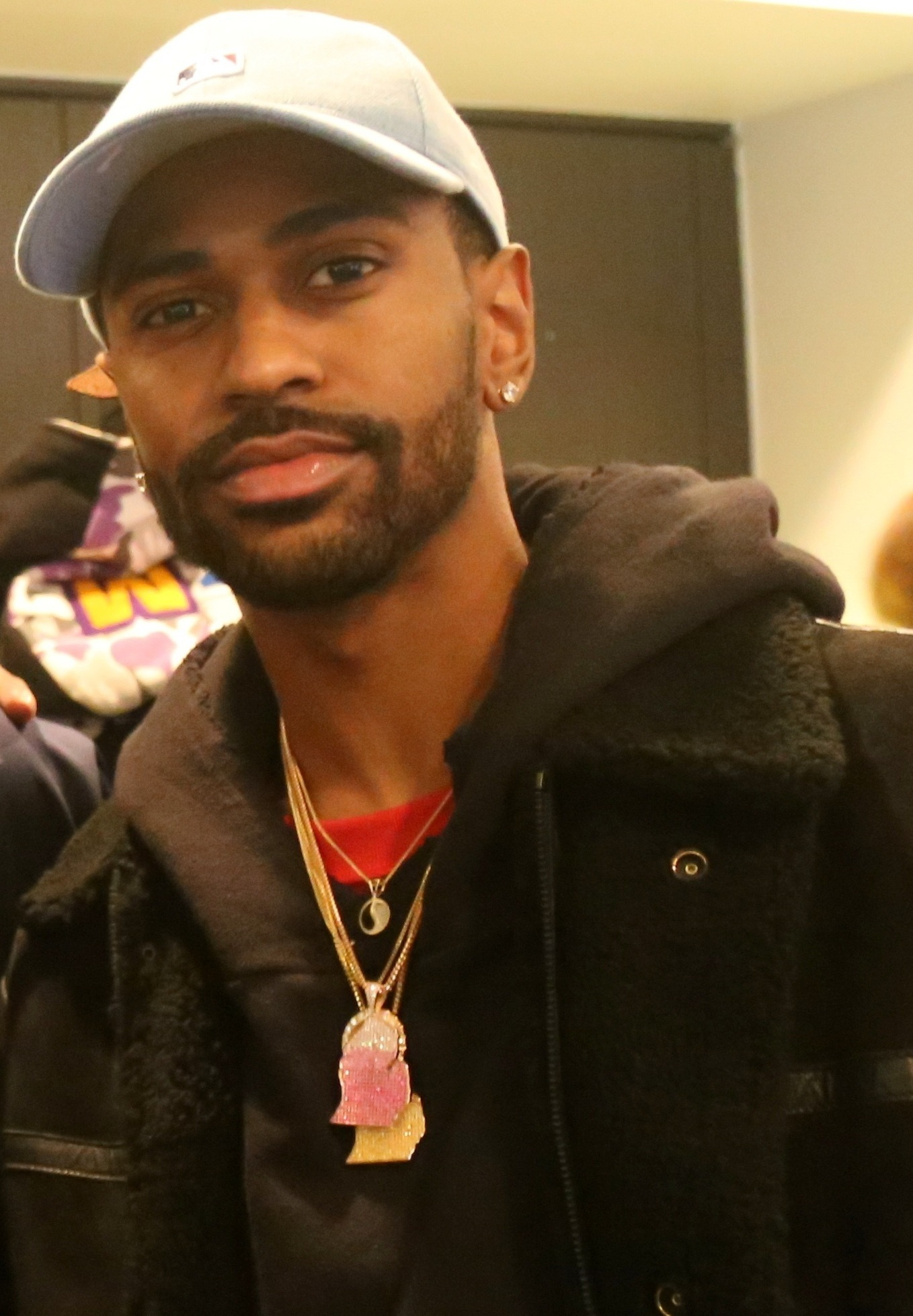
GOOD Music signee Big Sean performed a cover of "I Wonder" for BBC Radio 1Xtra Live Lounge.

A remix of "I Wonder" by Scottie B was included as the 18th track of Sky High, a mixtape consisting of remixes of tracks that West originally produced and that was compiled by DJ Benzi with the rapper's associate Plain Pat. The project was commissioned by West and his team in the lead-up to his fourth studio album 808s & Heartbreak, with each remix experiencing at least five reiterations before release. Most of the tracks were club-friendly, dance themed numbers.

In October 2009, Nabil Elderkin published his book Glow in the Dark, which focuses on West's tour of the same name, with a bonus CD including a live instrumental of the track. Entertainer Donald Glover, under his stage name of Childish Gambino, interpolated "I Wonder" on the track "We Ain't Them" from his 2012 mixtape Royalty. On February 6, 2017, fellow rapper Big Sean, who was mentored and signed to GOOD Music by West, covered the song on BBC Radio 1Xtra's Live Lounge for the 10-year anniversary of Graduation and the lead-up to his fourth album, I Decided. Big Sean was backed by a live-band and appropriated certain lyrics for his life, including rapping that his name "would help light up the Detroit skyline".

== Legacy ==
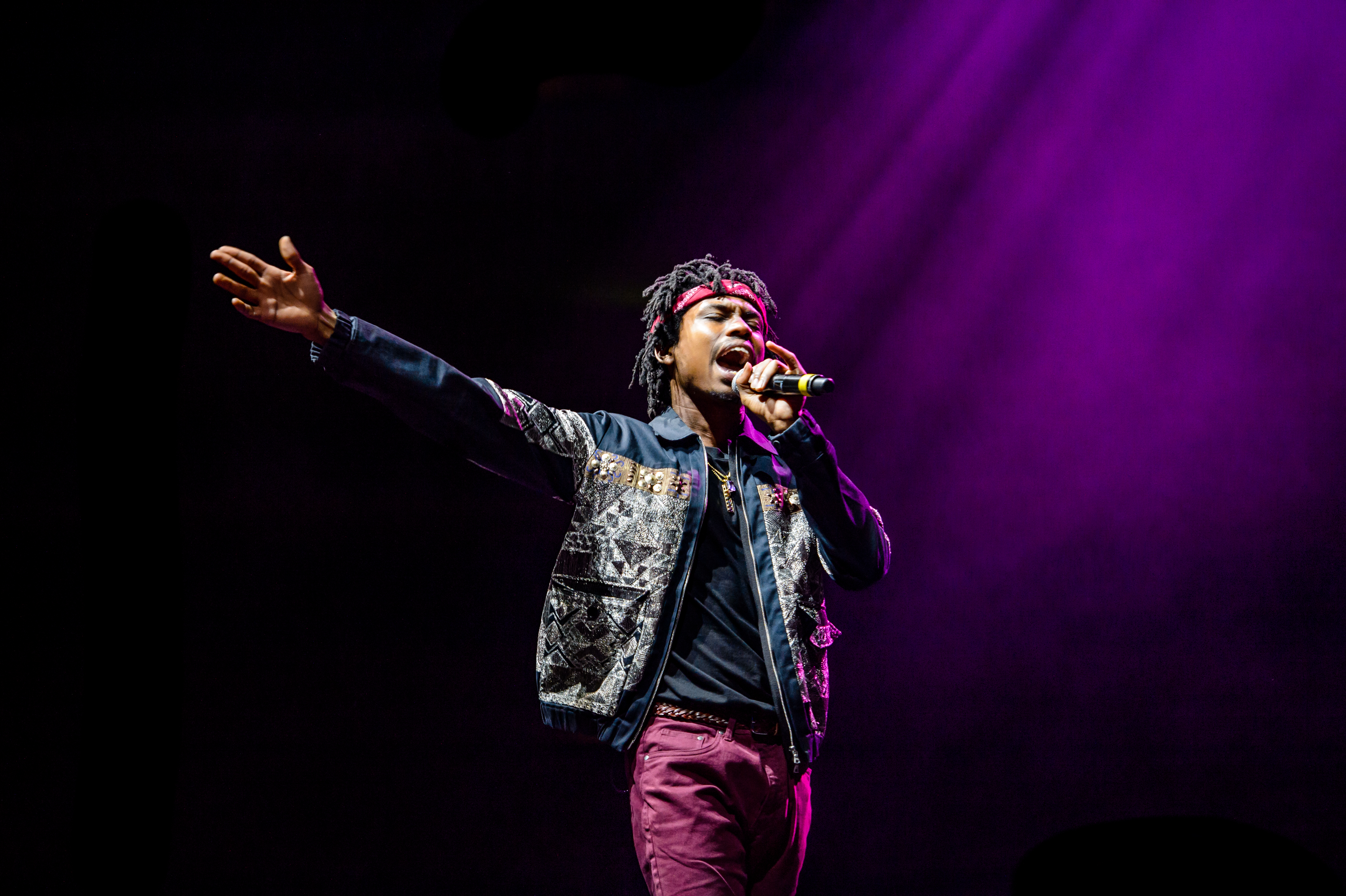
The song directly inspired Raury to pursue a career as a musician.

"I Wonder" has become a cult classic amongst listeners. The musical composition has also left an impact on other recording artists and musicians. In a 2015 interview with The Guardian, while making a list of songs that influenced him most, singer-songwriter Raury described "I Wonder" as the song that helped him begin his career. Raury elaborated that Graduation was one of the first albums he ever purchased when forming an interest in music, despite not knowing who West was at the time. "I Wonder" inspired Raury to write his first verse to the song at 14 years old, which convinced Justice Baiden to be his manager as he continuously rapped over the instrument, with its impact remaining across his career.

During an interview with Big Boy for Los Angeles radio station Power 106 in September 2013, the Canadian musician Drake was asked to list songs and verses from other artists of any genres that he wishes he had recorded, naming "I Wonder" as an example. In a 2017 piece for the 10th anniversary of Graduation, Billboard's Carl Lamarre acknowledged that West outselling fellow rapper 50 Cent's Curtis moved hip hop away from gangsta rap. Lamarre explained that West helped the genre shift towards vulnerability and experimentation, citing "I Wonder" as an example. Billboard spoke to rappers on the anniversary, including Kyle, who recalled that the song "put me in a vibe" that wasn't possible to replicate when heavily drunk. Vic Mensa imparted that the song was his favorite from the album and he had listened to it before high school football games, remembering often doing so despite a lack of memory from "smoking a lot of dope [at] 12". After Drake and West's benefit concert for Larry Hoover's jail funds in September 2022, the musician captioned an Instagram post with lyrics from the song.

== Credits and personnel ==
Information taken from Graduation liner notes.

Recording

- Recorded at Henson Recording Studios (Hollywood, CA), Sony Music Studios (NYC) and The Record Plant (Hollywood)
- Mixed at Legacy Recording Studios (NYC)

Personnel

- Kanye West – songwriter, producer
- Labi Siffre – songwriter
- Andrew Dawson – recording, mix engineer
- Greg Koller – recording
- Anthony Kilhoffer – recording
- Bram Tobey – assistant mix engineer
- Jason Agel – assistant mix engineer
- Nate Hertweck – assistant mix engineer
- Dale Parsons – assistant mix engineer
- Omar Edwards – piano & synths
- Jon Brion – keyboards
- Emma Kummrow – violin
- Igor Szwec – violin
- Gloria Justen – violin
- Olga Konopelsky – violin
- Luigi Mazzocchi – violin
- Charles Parker – violin
- Peter Nocella – viola
- Alexandra Leem – viola
- Jennie Lorenzo – cello
- Tim Ressler – bass
- Larry Gold – string arranger, conductor

== Charts ==
Chart performance for "I Wonder"
Chart (2023)	Peak position
Lithuania (AGATA)	88

== Certifications ==
Certifications for "I Wonder"
Region	Certification	Certified units/sales
New Zealand (RMNZ)	2× Platinum	60,000^{‡}
United Kingdom (BPI)	Platinum	600,000^{‡}
United States (RIAA)	3× Platinum	3,000,000^{‡}
^{‡} Sales+streaming figures based on certification alone.
