= Crying Laughing Loving Lying =

Studio album by Labi Siffre
- Released: 1972
- Studios: Chappell, London
- Genres: Folk rock; folk; folk-pop
- Length: 39:29; 62:08 (bonus tracks)
- Label: Pye International
- Producer: Labi Siffre

Labi Siffre chronology
The Singer and the Song (1971)	Crying Laughing Loving Lying (1972)	For the Children (1973)

Singles from Crying Laughing Loving Lying
- 1. "It Must Be Love" Released: 5 November 1971

Professional ratings
Review scores
Source	Rating
Pitchfork	9.0/10

Crying Laughing Loving Lying is the third studio album by English singer-songwriter Labi Siffre, released in 1972, by Pye International.

All songs were written, performed and produced by Siffre, and the album was recorded at Chappell Studios in London.

The record contains two of Labi's best known songs: "It Must Be Love" (No. 14, 1971, later covered by and a No. 4 hit for Madness, for which Siffre himself appeared in the video); and "Crying Laughing Loving Lying" (No. 11, 1972).

Both "It Must Be Love" and "Crying Laughing Loving Lying" were released as singles in the US by Bell Records but failed to chart. The album was never released in the US. Siffre had his first US singles success as a songwriter when, in 1983, the cover version of "It Must Be Love" by Madness peaked on the Billboard Hot 100 chart at No. 33.

Olivia Newton-John covered "Crying Laughing Loving Lying" on her 1975 album, Clearly Love, Whitney covered "Crying Laughing Loving Lying" on their 2020 album Candid, and Peach Pit covered "Crying Laughing Loving Lying" on the 2025 expanded version of their album Magpie.

Kanye West prominently sampled "My Song" for his track "I Wonder" off his 2007 album Graduation.

The remastered album was released on CD in 2006 by EMI, featuring six bonus tracks and liner notes by Siffre.

== Track listing ==
All tracks are written by Labi Siffre.

Side 1
No.	Title	Length
1.	"Saved"	2:11
2.	"Cannock Chase"	4:07
3.	"Fool Me a Good Night"	3:45
4.	"It Must Be Love"	3:57
5.	"Gimme More"	2:55
6.	"Blue Lady"	5:06

Side 2
No.	Title	Length
7.	"Love Oh Love Oh Love"	4:27
8.	"Crying Laughing Loving Lying"	3:03
9.	"Hotel Room Song"	2:54
10.	"My Song"	4:44
11.	"Till Forever"	1:15
12.	"Come On Michael"	2:58
Total length:		39:29

Bonus tracks on 2006 CD reissue
No.	Title	Length
1.	"You Make It Easy"	4:12
2.	"Good Old Days"	3:12
3.	"Pristine Verses"	3:03
4.	"You'll Let Me Know"	3:50
5.	"Oh Me Oh My Mr. City Goodbye"	3:52
6.	"For the Lovin'"	4:30
Total length:		62:08

== Personnel ==
- Labi Siffre – vocals, guitar, bass (8), piano (2, 10), electric piano on (6, 7, 8 & 12), organ (8), celesta (4, 9)
- Les Hurdle, Dave Richmond – bass
- Brian Bennett, Barry De Souza – drums
- Francis Monkman, Peter Robinson – electric piano
- Richard Tattersall – ukulele (4)
- Harry Cornet, Ray Warleigh, Alan Skidmore, Don Fay – flute
- Hugh Potts, Jeff Bryant, Martyn Ford – French horn
- Stephen Maw, Vanessa Poole, Robin Thompson – bassoon
- Richard Studt – string leader (2 & 10)
- Nick Ingman – conductor (2 & 10)

== Charts ==
Chart performance for Crying Laughing Loving Lying
Chart (1972)	Peak position
UK Albums (Official Charts)	46

Chart (2026)	Peak position
Scottish Albums (Official Charts)	72
UK Album Sales (Official Charts)	82
UK Independent Albums (Official Charts)	30
