= 2008 Bonnaroo Music Festival =

The 2008 Bonnaroo Music and Arts Festival was held June 12–15. Aside from the festival's opening year (2002), attendance at the 2008 event, at approximately 70,000, was the smallest in Bonnaroo's history.

== Cancellations and rescheduling ==
Bonnaroo had many cancellations and reschedules by artists both before and during the event. Cancellations included Black Kids, who appeared on the initial line-up but were later removed. Two months prior, due to health issues, The Allman Brothers Band cancelled their slot at the festival. Their cancellation led to the replacement band Widespread Panic being announced as the festival closer. Due to a schedule conflict, David Cross also had to cancel his appearance and was replaced by Louis C.K. in the Bonnaroo Comedy Theatre.

== During the festival ==
The surprise SuperJam was composed of Les Claypool on bass/vocals, Eugene Hutz (guitar/vocals), Sergei Ryabtsev (violin), Oren Kaplan (guitar), and Yuri Lemeshev (accordion) of Gogol Bordello, and Claypool's touring drummer (and Cake member) Paulo Baldi on drums. They were later joined by Kirk Hammett of Metallica on guitar for three numbers. Hammett was introduced by Claypool as "some guy that used to sell me weed back in high school." The set consisted of eleven Tom Waits covers ("Russian Dance" was performed twice, the second time as an encore), along with a single Claypool song, "D's Diner".

Chris Rock's main stage set was billed as being "one of the largest ever for a comedy show".

Kidz Jam, a non-profit organization out of Dayton, Ohio provided free entertainment, water, earplugs and safety information for the families which attended Bonnaroo in 2008.

Kanye West's Saturday night set, having been moved back and forth between stages by Bonnaroo promoters, eventually ran on the main stage. West was not on time due to a scheduling conflict. This, in addition to Pearl Jam playing over an hour longer than scheduled and taking a long time to remove their equipment, and the complex stage set-up for West's performance, meant the show started at 5:00 am.

== Line-up ==
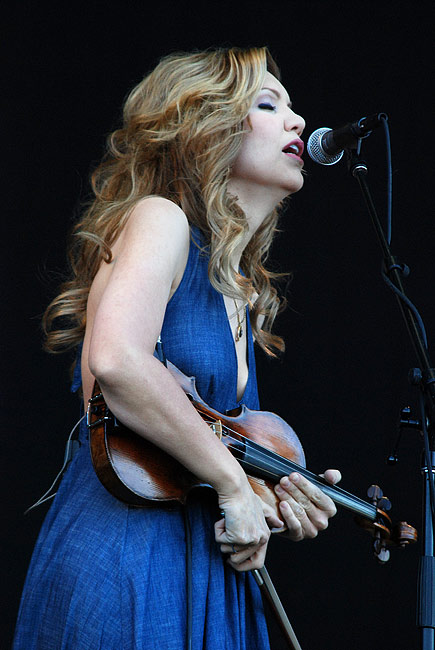
Alison Krauss

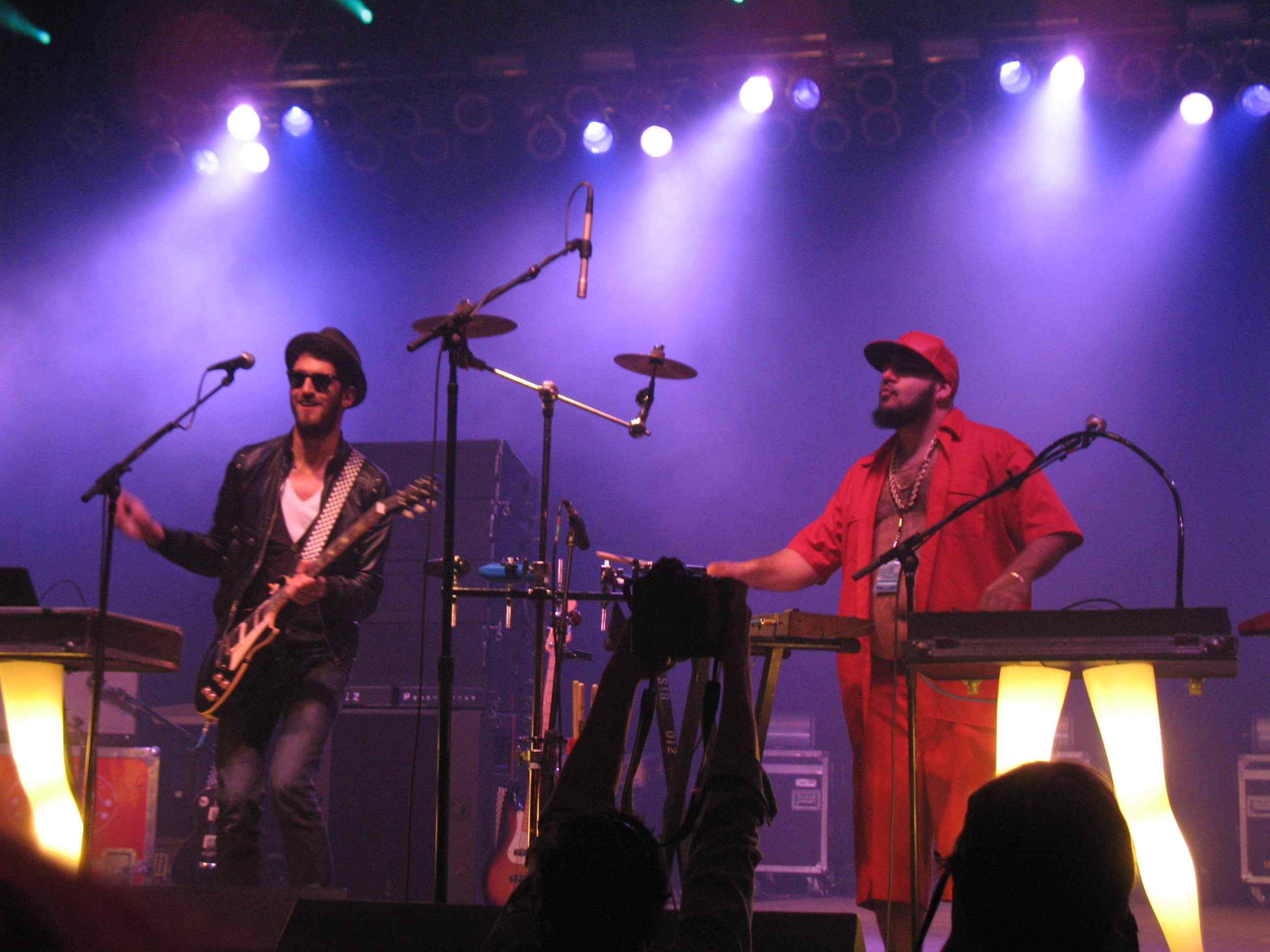
Chromeo

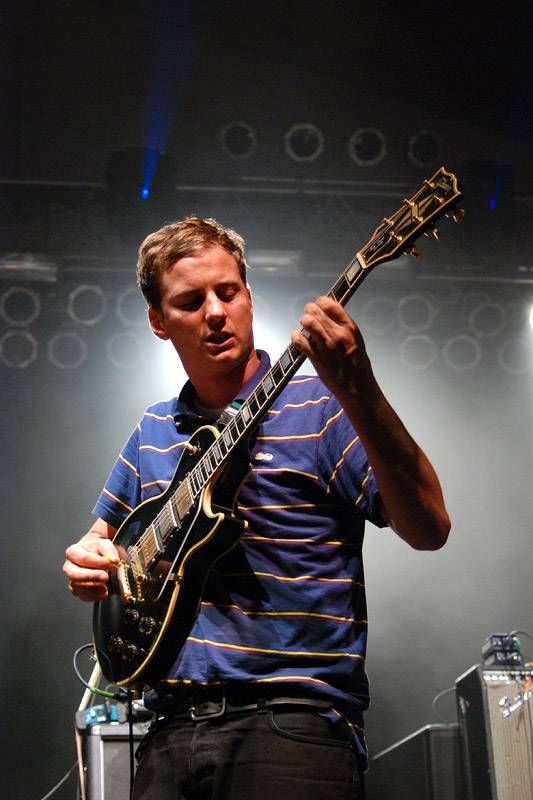
Battles

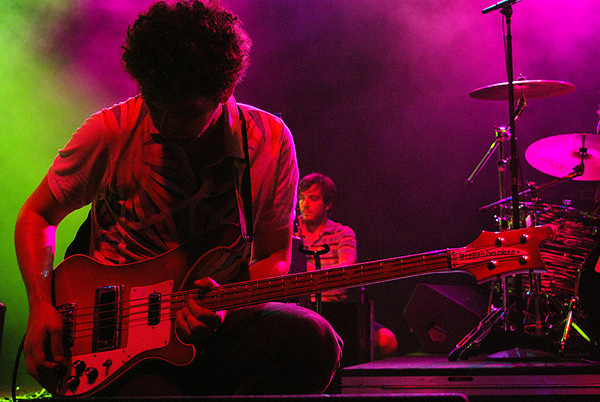
MGMT

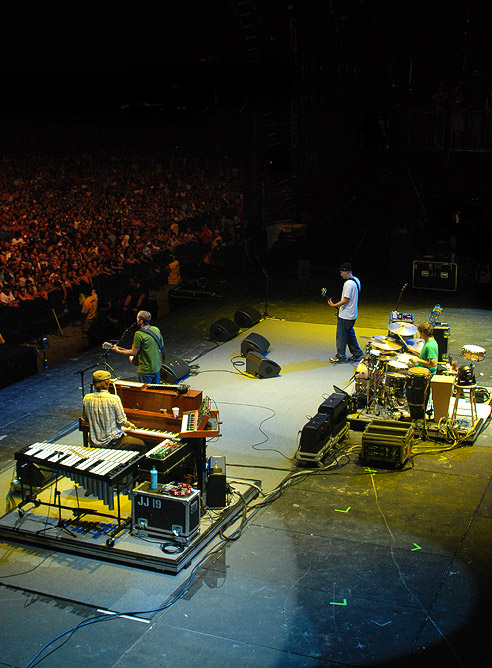
Jack Johnson

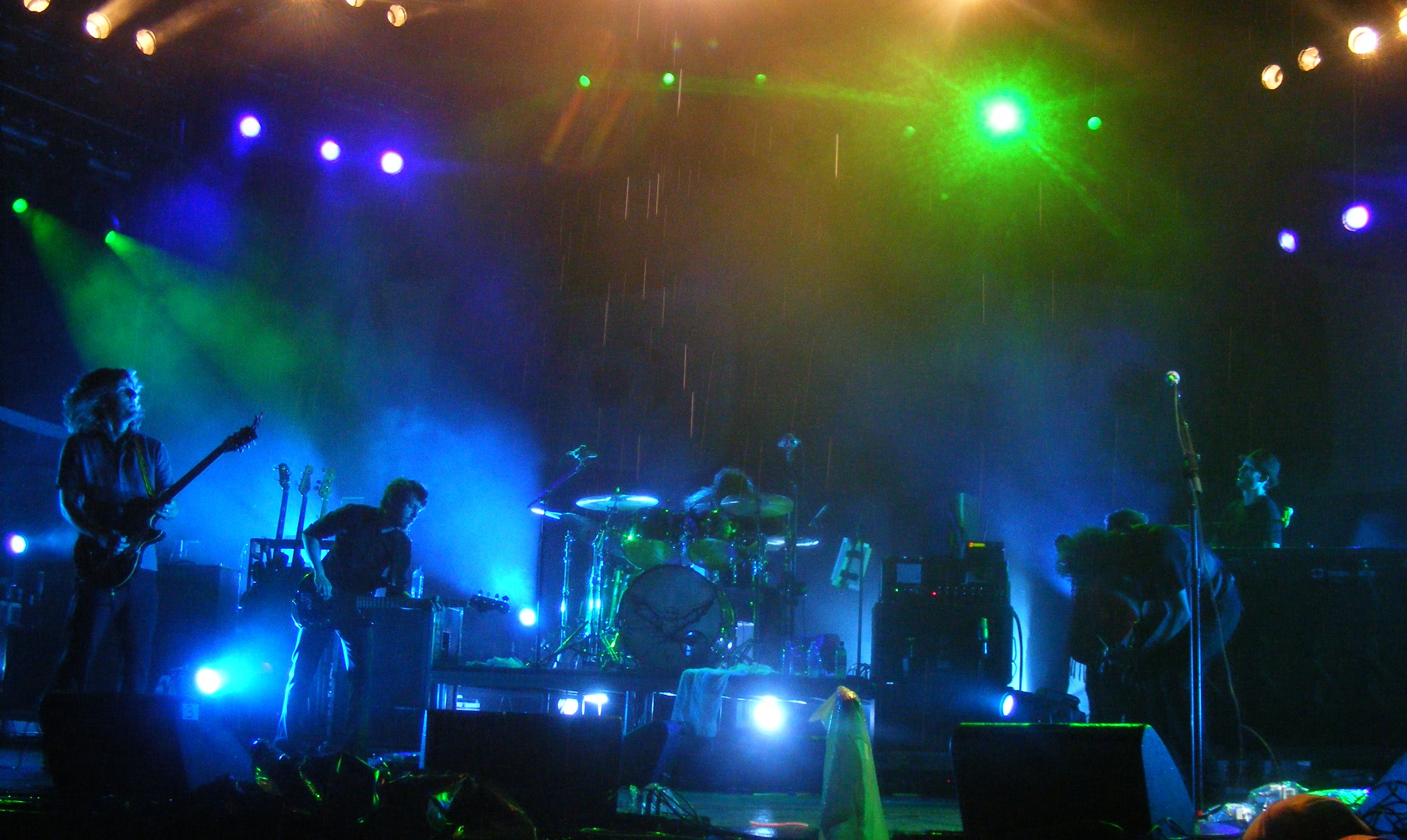
My Morning Jacket

2008 Bonnaroo Music Festival Line-up
BP	Artists	Venue	BP	Artists	Venue
(United States)	!!!	That Tent	(United States)	The Avett Brothers	The Other Tent
(United States)	Against Me!		(United States)	Aimee Mann	The Other Tent
(United States)	B.B. King	What Stage	(Isle of Man)	Back Door Slam	That Tent
(United States)	Battles	This Tent	(United States)	Ben Folds	Which Stage
(United States)	Zappa Plays Zappa		(Canada)	Broken Social Scene	The Other Tent
(United States)	Dark Star Orchestra	The Other Tent	(United States)	Death Cab for Cutie	Which Stage
(United States)	Derek Trucks & Susan Tedeschi’s Soul Stew Revival	That Tent	(United States)	Donavon Frankenreiter	
(United States)	Drive-By Truckers	Which Stage	(United States)	Ghostland Observatory	This Tent
(United States)	Gogol Bordello		(United States)	Grupo Fantasma	
(United States)	Iron & Wine	This Tent	(Jamaica)	Israel Vibration	
(United States)	Jack Johnson		(United States)	Jakob Dylan	This Tent
(Sweden)	José González	This Tent	(United States)	Kanye West	What Stage
(England)	Ladytron	The Other Tent	(United States)	Levon Helm and the Ramble on the Road	The Other Tent
(United States)	Lez Zeppelin	That Tent	(United States)	Little Feat	
(United States)	Lupe Fiasco	The Other Tent	(England)	MIA	That Tent
(United States)	MGMT	This Tent	(United States)	Mason Jennings	
(United States)	Mastodon	That Tent	(United States)	Metallica	What Stage
(United States)	Minus the Bear	That Tent	(United States)	My Morning Jacket	Which Stage
(United States)	Nicole Atkins		(United States)	OAR	Which Stage
(Senegal)	Orchestra Baobab		(United States)	Ozomatli	What Stage
(United States)	Pat Green	This Tent	(United States)	Pearl Jam	What Stage
(United States)	Phil Lesh & Friends	Which Stage	(United States)	Rilo Kiley	This Tent
(England) (United States)	Robert Plant & Alison Krauss	What Stage	(United States)	Robert Randolph's Revival	That Tent
(Canada)	Serena Ryder		(United States)	Sharon Jones & the Dap Kings	Which Stage
(Iceland)	Sigur Rós	That Tent	(United States)	Solomon Burke	That Tent
(United States)	State Radio		(United States)	Steel Train	
(Republic of Ireland)	The Swell Season	This Tent	(United States)	Talib Kweli	The Other Tent
(Canada)	Tegan & Sara	This Tent	(United States)	The Allman Brothers Band	(cancelled)
(United States)	Abigail Washburn & the Sparrow Quartet feat. Bela Fleck		(Netherlands) (United States) (Sweden) (Canada)	Tiësto feat. Cary Brothers, José González, and Tegan & Sara	This Tent
(United States)	The Felice Brothers		(United States)	The Fiery Furnaces	That Tent
(United States)	The Lee Boys	That Tent	(United States)	The Raconteurs	What Stage
(United States)	The Sword	That Tent	(Canada)	MSTRKRFT	That Tent
(United States)	Two Gallants	This Tent		Umphrey's McGee	Which Stage
(United States)	Vampire Weekend	This Tent	(United States)	Willie Nelson	Which Stage
(United States)	Yonder Mountain String Band	What Stage	(Canada)	Chromeo	This Tent
(United States)	The Disco Biscuits	That Tent	(United States)	Les Claypool	Which Stage
(United States)	Chali 2na	The Other Tent		Don DiLego	
	The Sons of Roswell		(England)	Newton Faulkner	
(United States)	Stephen Marley	What Stage	(United States)	Vampire Weekend	This Tent
(United States)	Widespread Panic	What Stage	(United States)	What Made Milwaukee Famous	This Tent
(United States)	Phil Lesh, Larry Campbell and Jackie Greene		(United States)	The Bluegrass Allstars feat. Luke Bulla, Sam Bush, Jerry Douglas, Bela Fleck, Edgar Meyer and Bryan Sutton	

Somethin' Else- New Orleans:

- Porter – Batiste – Stoltz
- Dirty Dozen Brass Band
- Big Sam's Funky Nation
- Morning 40 Federation
- Ivan Neville's Dumpstaphunk
- Walter "Wolfman" Washington
- Trombone Shorty & Orleans Avenue
- Harrybu McCage
- Henry Butler and the Game Band
- Anders Osborne
- Soul Rebels Brass Band
- New Orleans Superjam led by George Porter Jr.

Bonnaroo Comedy:

- Chris Rock
- Louis C.K.
- Janeane Garofalo
- Reggie Watts
- Zach Galifianakis
- Jim Norton
- Brian Posehn
- Joe DeRosa
- Mike Birbiglia
- John Mulaney
- Michelle Buteau
- Leo Allen

Cafe Acts

- Alana Grace
- Amy LaVere
- Bear in Heaven
- Bombadil
- Carney
- Colour Revolt
- Cornmeal
- De Novo Dahl
- Dead Confederate
- Electric Touch
- Erick Baker
- Extra Golden
- Howlin Rain
- Jake Shimabukuro
- Jessie Baylin
- Jypsi
- K'naan
- Lord T & Eloise
- Mike Farris featuring Roseland Rhythm Revue
- The Nikhil Korula Band
- Nomo
- Person L
- Phonograph
- The Postelles
- Rotary Downs
- Royal Bangs
- Scissormen
- Sometymes Why
- stephaniesid
- Tennessee Schmaltz
- The Afromotive
- The American Plague
- The Big Sleep
- The Duhks
- the Everybodyfields
- The Greencards
- Weather Underground
- Your Vegas

Cinema Tent

- Heavy Metal in Baghdad
