= Remember My Song =

1975 album by Labi Siffre

Studio album by Labi Siffre
- Released: 1975
- Genres: Soul; funk; R&B
- Length: 42:37
- Label: Pye International
- Producers: Big Jim Sullivan; Derek Lawrence

Labi Siffre chronology
For the Children (1973)	Remember My Song (1975)	Happy (1975)

Singles from Remember My Song
- 1. "Dreamer" Released: 1974; 2. "Another Year" Released: 1975; 3. "I Got The..." Released: 1975

Professional ratings
Review scores
Source	Rating
AllMusic	3.5/5 stars

Remember My Song is the fifth studio album by British musician Labi Siffre. Released in 1975, it was the first of Siffre's two albums released that year, the other being Happy.

Despite having some notable backing musicians such as Big Jim Sullivan co-producing, Brian Bennett of the Shadows on drums, and Chas & Dave who would become well known in their own right, the album did not chart.

The album garnered a resurgence of interest in 1999, when its opening track "I Got The..." was sampled by American rapper Eminem on his first hit "My Name Is", eventually leading to the whole album being reissued in 2006.

== Composition and recording ==
It was co-produced by session guitarist Big Jim Sullivan and record producer Derek Lawrence. Siffre wrote or co-wrote all tracks on the album with the exception of "Old Time Song", which was written by studio musicians Chas Hodges and Dave Peacock, who later became known as the duo Chas & Dave.

Like all of Siffre's previous albums, Remember My Song was released on the Pye International record label.

== Legacy ==
The album lingered in obscurity for many years until 1999 when the beginning song "I Got The..." was sampled by the American rappers Eminem and Dr. Dre for Eminem's first hit single "My Name Is". The hook played by Hodges and Peacock featured prominently and was heavily repeated throughout the single in a replayed sample.

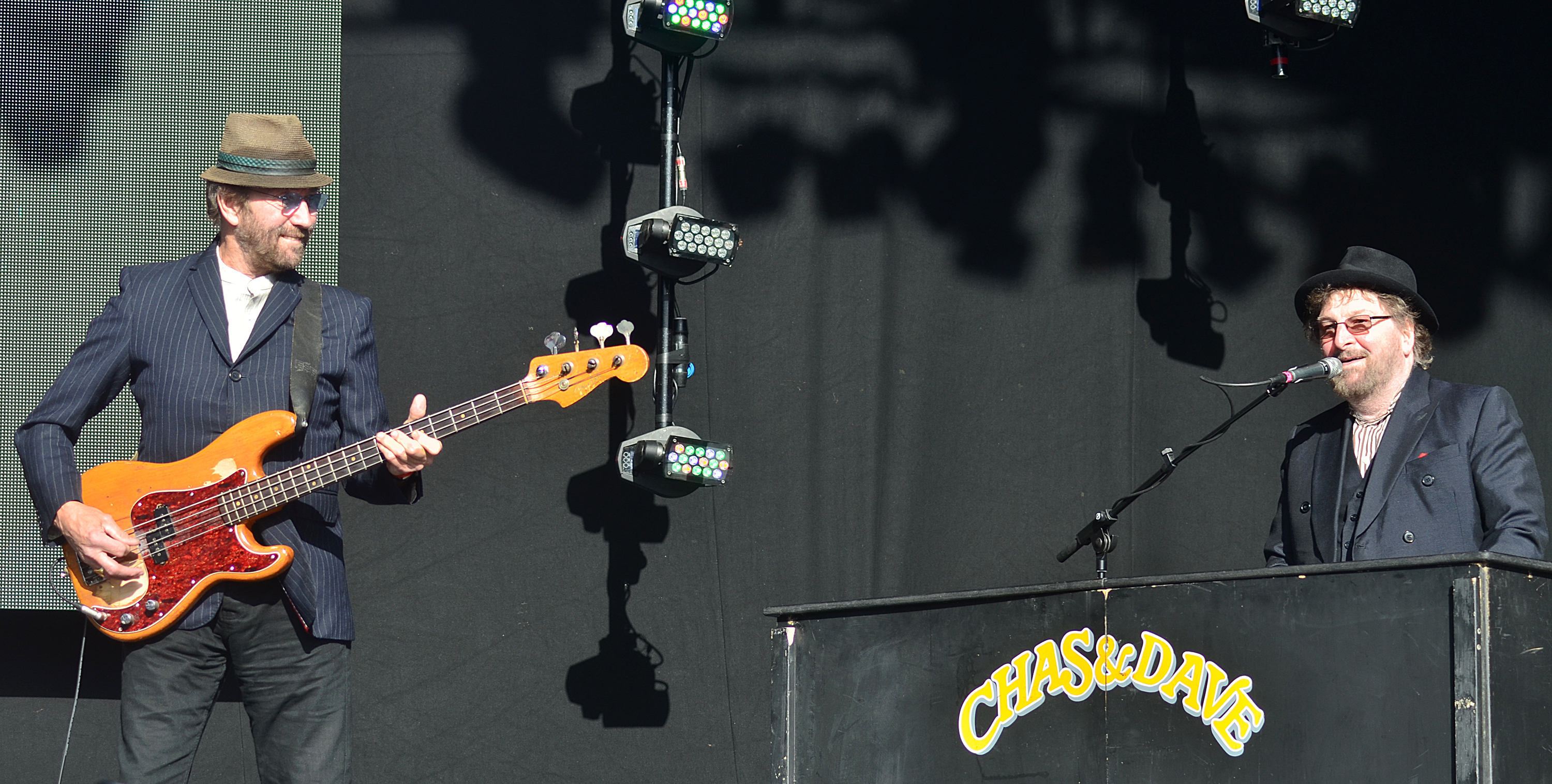
Hodges and Peacock in 2015

This newfound interest in Siffre's work led to "I Got The..." being released as a single in 2003 on the Stateside record label, with a larger collection of Siffre tracks being reissued in 2006.

"I Got The..." was also sampled a few years earlier by another rapper Jay-Z on the track "Streets Is Watching," from his 1997 album In My Lifetime, Vol. 1, although he used a different part of the song than Eminem.

== Track listing ==
All tracks are written by Labi Siffre, except where noted.

Side one
No.	Title	Writer(s)	Length
1.	"I Got The..."		6:36
2.	"Another Year"		4:12
3.	"Down"		5:45
4.	"Old Time Song"	Chas Hodges; Dave Peacock	4:48

Side two
No.	Title	Writer(s)	Length
5.	"The Vulture"		3:43
6.	"Dreamer"	Billy Hill; Siffre	4:01
7.	"Sadie And The Devil"		3:51
8.	"Turn On Your Love"	Siffre; Ray Russell	3:42
9.	"Remember My Song"		5:59
Total length:			42:37

Bonus tracks on 2006 re-release
No.	Title	Length
10.	"You've Got a Hold on Me"	3:54
11.	"Hot and Dirt in the City"	3:11
12.	"Solid Love"	2:37
Total length:		52:19

== Personnel ==
- Labi Siffre - vocals, backing vocals, acoustic guitar (2, 6, 8), electronic piano (1, 3, 5, 7)
- Brian Bennett - drums (4)
- Alan Branscombe - alto saxophone (7), electric piano (2, 4, 9), percussion (1, 3, 5, 6, 8)
- Chas Hodges - guitar, backing vocals
- Gordon Neville - backing vocals
- Dave Peacock - bass
- Jacqui Sullivan - backing vocals
- Big Jim Sullivan - lead guitar, arranger
- Ian Wallace - drums all except 4
- The Dean Street Bass - horns
- The Rock and Roll Gypsies - strings
