= Erick Baker =

American singer-songwriter (born 1978)

- Born: December 12, 1978 (age 47); Halls, Tennessee, United States
- Genre
- Occupation: Singer-songwriter
- Instruments: Guitar, vocals
- Years active: Since 2008; 18 years ago
- Website: erickbaker.com

Erick Baker (born December 12, 1978) is an American singer-songwriter from Knoxville, Tennessee. Whose known for his songs Unbroken promise, 1200 Days and All We Need.

Baker preformed with national acts which include rock musician James Blunt, alternative country musician Brandi Carlile, pop-rock musician Gavin DeGraw, the rock band Goo Goo Dolls, the rock band, R&B artist John Legend, indie-rock musician Edwin McCain and rock musician Grace Potter.

== Early life and education ==
Baker was born in Halls, Tennessee on December 12, 1978. He began his love for music when he was a teenager but didnt sing or write songs, Baker only began performing when he enrolled at the University of Tennessee where he studied communication. Before Baker attended University, he went to Halls High School where he played football and [participated in Student Council and Class President but later graduated in 1997.

== Career ==
Baker started his career in a local rock band known as Down From Up with Baker as the front man/lead vocalist. They released a live album in 2006 titled Live: Far From the Bottom and then their first full-length album A Terrible Beauty in 2007. In early 2008 Baker was replaced by bandmate Matt Brewster as the lead vocalist, the reasons why are still unknown. The band disbanded in late 2010 after another album.

Baker's breakthrough came as an opportunity to support Legend.

On February 29, 2008, Baker released his debut extended play, It's Getting Too Late to Say It's Early, produced by Travis Wyrick.

Baker recorded his first full-length studio album, Holding the Pieces in Place, in 2010. After the album's release in April of that year, he toured with Heart. His concert repertoire began to expand around this time, and included a cover version of the song "Fight For Your Right To Party" by the hip-hop band Beastie Boys. Later that year, he also released a live album, Erick Baker: Live at the Bijou Theatre (recorded and mixed by Ben McAmis), as well as Stay Awhile, a live DVD containing footage of Baker performing and discussing his music (also mixed and edited by Ben McAmis).

Baker began work on his next studio album in early 2011 with producer Ken Coomer. He ended the year performing at the official Belk Bowl FanFest in Charlotte, North Carolina, along with McCain and the rock band Daughtry, as well as at a New Year's Eve show for the U.S. troops stationed at the Guantanamo Bay Naval Base in Cuba.

Baker's second studio album, Goodbye June, was released on June 26, 2012, followed by his first European tour. The album's lead single, "In Love with a Lie", was influenced by a phone conversation Baker had with a friend about a failed relationship.

Baker's third album, Dear Amanda, was released on May 27, 2016.

Baker's fourth album, Morning Light, was released on January 31, 2020.

== Musical style ==
His genre-bending approach has resulted in crossover appeal, according to Underground Music Reviews in 2010. A self-taught guitarist and vocalist, Baker writes and performs "intricately crafted, emotive Americana". In 2008, Mountain Xpress described him as having a "raw and powerful" voice, and an "ability to whip an early crowd into a respectable frenzy".

== Discography ==
Down From Up

- Live: Far From the Bottom (2006)
- A Terrible Beauty (2007)

Solo

=== Extended Plays ===
- It's Getting Too Late to Say It's Early (2008)

=== Albums ===
- Holding the Pieces in Place (2010)
- Goodbye June (2012)
- Dear Amanda (2016)

=== Live ===
- Live at the Bijou Theater CD/DVD (2010)
- Stay Awhile DVD (2010)

== See also ==
- List of people from Knoxville, Tennessee
- List of singer-songwriters
- Music of Tennessee
