= Glow in the Dark (book) =

Biographical photo essay by Kanye West

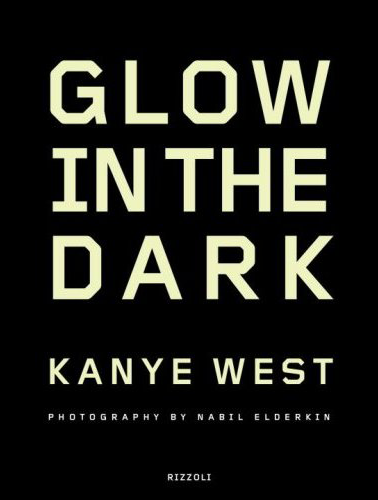
- Cover
- Author: Kanye West
- Illustrator: Nabil Elderkin (photography)
- Cover artist: Base
- Language: English
- Publisher: Rizzoli USA
- Publication date: October 20, 2009
- Publication place: United States
- Pages: 288
- ISBN: 0-8478-3240-6
- OCLC: 244055631

Glow in the Dark is a biographical photo essay about Kanye West's Glow in the Dark Tour published by Rizzoli USA on October 20, 2009. Authored by West, the book was designed by Base and features 400 exclusive images taken on the tour by Australian-American photographer Nabil Elderkin, who had previously directed several of West's music videos.

The 9″ by 13″ hardcover book comes in a clamshell case and documents the Glow in the Dark Tour over 288 pages. It includes photographs of West on and off the stage, conceptual plans for the tour's set design and costumes, and exclusive commentary in the form of an interview of West with Spike Jonze. It was accompanied by a CD of live music and unreleased instrumentals as well as a web art project.
