= Siffredi =

Siffredi is an Italian surname. Notable people with the surname include:

- Marco Siffredi (1979–2002), French snowboarder and mountaineer
- Rocco Siffredi (born 1964), Italian pornographic actor, director, and producer
