= Labi Siffre (album) =

Studio album by Labi Siffre
- Released: 1970
- Genre: Folk-pop
- Length: 34:28; 55:05 (Bonus tracks)
- Label: Pye International
- Producer: Ian Green

Labi Siffre chronology
Labi Siffre (1970)	The Singer and the Song (1971)

Labi Siffre is the self-titled debut studio album by English singer-songwriter Labi Siffre, released in 1970, by Pye International.

It was recorded and produced by Ian Green. The album was re-released on CD in 2006 by EMI featuring an additional six bonus tracks and liner notes by Siffre.

== Track listing ==
All tracks are written by Labi Siffre except where noted.

Side 1
No.	Title	Writer(s)	Length
1.	"Too Late"		3:17
2.	"Words"	Barry Gibb, Robin Gibb, Maurice Gibb	2:22
3.	"Something on My Mind"		2:38
4.	"Maybe Tomorrow"		3:41
5.	"You and I Should Be Together"		3:01
6.	"I Don't Know What's Happened to the Kids Today"		3:14

Side 2
No.	Title	Writer(s)	Length
7.	"I Love You"		2:35
8.	"Make My Day"		3:04
9.	"A Little More Line"		3:45
10.	"Maybe"	Harry Nilsson	2:49
11.	"River"		2:21
12.	"Love Song for Someone"		2:47
Total length:			34:28

Bonus tracks on 2006 CD reissue
No.	Title	Length
1.	"Why Did You Go, Why Did You Leave Me"	3:16
2.	"I Just Couldn't Live Without Her"	2:38
3.	"Last Night Tonight"	4:06
4.	"Maybe When We Dance"	4:04
5.	"Ask Me to Stay"	3:53
6.	"Here We Are"	2:40
Total length:		55:05

== Personnel ==
- Labi Siffre – Vocals, acoustic guitar, piano on "I Love You"
- Ian Green – production, mixing
