= Johnny Scott (jazz musician) =

- Born: John Kerningham Sidney Scott; 1938; Buffalo, New York, U.S.
- Died: 2010 (aged 71–72) Saint-Jean-sur-Richelieu, Quebec, Canada
- Genres: Jazz
- Occupation(s): Vocalist, instrumentalist
- Instrument: Tenor saxophone

John "Johnny" Kerningham Sidney Scott (ca. 1938 – April 20, 2010) was an American jazz vocalist and tenor saxophonist.

== Early life ==
Scott was born in Buffalo, New York, and began his musical studies at the age of 15.

== Career ==
After enlisting in the United States Army, he joined a band that entertained American troops in Europe. Subsequent to his discharge from the Army in the early-1960s, Scott moved to Montreal, Quebec, Canada, where he performed in a wide spectrum of settings for over 47 years.

Scott explored a variety of other genres over the course of his career, including pop music, R&B, and blues.

== Personal life ==
Scott died of cancer in Saint-Jean-sur-Richelieu, Québec, Canada, on April 20, 2010. He was 72 years old.

== Discography ==
- "Never Let Me Go"(with the Josh Rager sextet Time and Again Effendi records 2008)
- Easy Living (with the Geoff Lapp Trio) - Victor Studio / PJ Studio, 2003
- Contrasts (Geoff Lapp, pno; George Mitchell, bs; David Laing, dms) - JazzCo, 1990
- From Now On - JazzCo, 1986
