= Tup Tup Palace =

Nightclub in Newcastle upon Tyne, England

Coordinates: 54.9699°N 1.6122°W

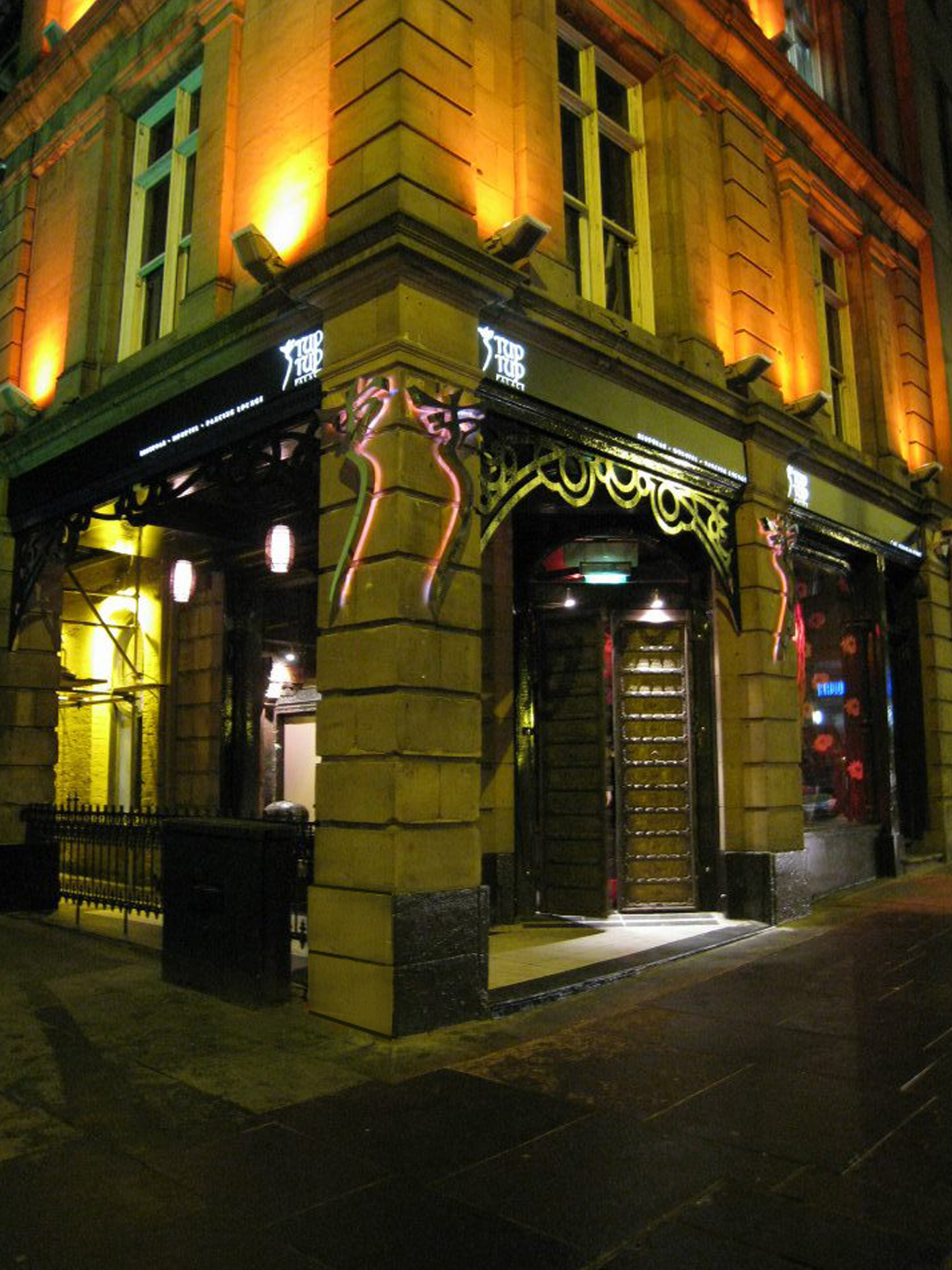
- Tup Tup Palace Exterior
- Interactive map of Tup Tup Palace
- Location: Newcastle upon Tyne, United Kingdom
- Owner: Aaron Mellor, Matt Smyth, Nigel Holiday and Nicholas Woodhead
- Capacity: 630
- Type: Nightclub

Construction
- Opened: 2007

Website
- tuptuppalace.com

Tup Tup Palace is a nightclub in Newcastle upon Tyne, United Kingdom. It was created in 2007 by entrepreneur James Jukes and club promoters Nigel Holliday and Matthew Smyth at a cost of £2M. The major investors were Nicholas Woodhead and Scottish & Newcastle PLC. The club is located opposite Newcastle Cathedral in the city centre. The venue has a capacity of 600 people and focuses largely on table service. It has become known primarily for its celebrity customers.

== History ==
The building at 7 Saint Nicholas Street formerly housed a pub known as Bar M, then a feature of Newcastle's Bigg Market nightlife circuit. Founder James Jukes purchased the site from Premium Bars & Restaurants PLC in 2007 for an undisclosed sum. The building was refurbished and extended, before being opened in December 2007 by Beverley Knight MBE.

On 15 November 2008 the venue caused a public row over projecting a logo onto Newcastle Cathedral to create a large billboard advertisement. The Dean of Newcastle at the time, the Very Reverend Christopher Dalliston, publicly called on Newcastle City Council to ban the publicity stunt, saying “These actions not only disregard the Christian faith but also the heritage of Newcastle. The lights have come into our Sunday evening worship and we are taking action.” The Council subsequently found that no laws had been broken and were unable to enforce a ban. In 2010, Jukes apologised for the stunt and donated the proceeds from a celebrity fashion show to the Cathedral to pay for decorative floodlighting.

On 31 December 2010 The X Factor winner Matt Cardle reportedly ran up an £8,000 bar tab at the venue celebrating New Year’s Eve and the success of his number one single When We Collide in the UK Singles Chart.

On 21 March 2011 Newcastle United F.C players Leon Best and Stephen Ireland issued a public apology to the football club and its supporters after being photographed at the venue with their shirts removed on the eve of a fixture against Stoke City F.C. The incident led to the then Newcastle United manager Alan Pardew banning the entire team from the venue.

On 14 May 2011 the club hosted the launch party of Newcastle Fashion Week, broadcast live on FashionTV to approximately 400 million viewers worldwide. will.i.am and fellow band members from The Black Eyed Peas attended the event. On 29 August 2011 a woman who had travelled from Manchester to celebrate her birthday at the club was attacked on the dancefloor. Northumbria Police released CCTV images of three women they wished to speak to in connection with the attack, though the perpetrators were never found.

On Thursday 19 September 2013, Channel 4 broadcast its documentary Bouncers, focusing on the club's 47 year old security guard Mark Tully. On 6 June 2015 a member of security staff was shot and injured in a drive-by shooting while standing at the entrance of the venue. Witnesses described seeing a black-clad motorcycle rider pull up outside the club at around 22:45 and open fire. A 26-year-old man was arrested in connection with the attack but was later released without charge. Police publicly linked the shooting to members of a well known crime family, although this was denied by a family spokesman and no arrests were made. In the wake of the shooting MP Chi Onwurah publicly raised concerns about inadequate police CCTV coverage in Newcastle and called for change.

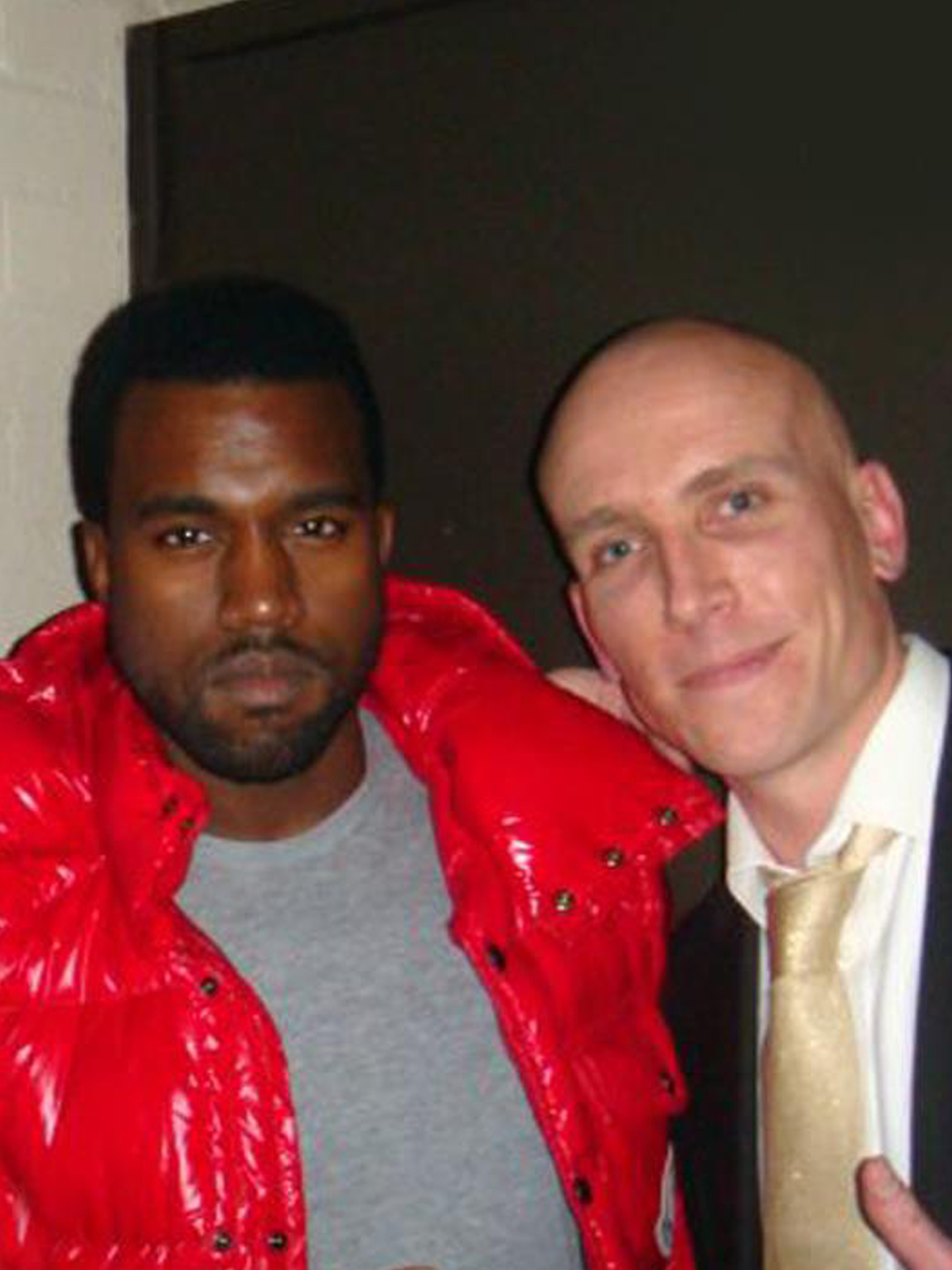
Kanye West (left) with venue owner James Jukes

The venue has had numerous celebrity visitors. Noted customers have included Kanye West, Cheryl Fernandez-Versini, Snoop Dogg and others. The club is regularly used as a location for MTV reality TV show Geordie Shore.

Tup Tup Palace has received mixed reviews over the years with some publications reporting that it is overpriced and attracts pretentious people.

== Ownership ==
The business and the leasehold of the building is owned by the operating company Tup Tup Palace Limited, registered in the United Kingdom as company number 06656176. The listed shareholders and Directors of the company are James Jukes, Nigel Holliday, Matthew Smyth, Aaron Mellor and Nicholas Woodhead.
