= Labi Siffre =

British musician (born 1945)

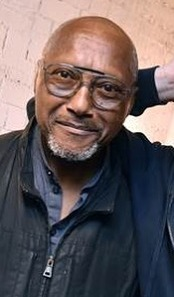
- Siffre in 2017

Background information
- Born: Claudius Afolabi Siffre; 25 June 1945 (age 81); Hammersmith, London, England
- Genres: Soul; jazz; funk; soft rock; folk
- Occupations: Musician; singer; songwriter; poet
- Instruments: Vocals; guitar; keyboards
- Years active: 1970–present
- Labels: EMI; Pye; China; Demon
- Spouse: Peter Lloyd (m. 2005; died 2013) Rudolf van Baardwijk (m. 2014; died 2016)
- Partner: Peter Lloyd (1964 - m. 2005)

Claudius Afolabi "Labi" Siffre (/ˈlæ.bi sɪfri/ LAB-ee SIF-ree, born 25 June 1945) is a British singer, songwriter and poet. Siffre released nine albums between 1970 and 1998. His compositions include "It Must Be Love" (later covered by the band Madness), "Crying Laughing Loving Lying", and "(Something Inside) So Strong" – an anti-apartheid song inspired by a television documentary – which hit Number 4 on the UK chart. The latter song won Siffre the Ivor Novello Award for Best Song Musically and Lyrically from the British Academy of Songwriters, Composers and Authors.

In addition to music, he has published essays, the stage and television play Deathwrite and three volumes of poetry: Nigger, Blood on the Page, and Monument.

== Early life and education ==
Claudius Afolabi Siffre was born in Hammersmith, London in 1945 as the fourth of five brothers to a Yoruba Nigerian father and a mother of Bajan descent. Siffre's father, whom he described as "a giant of a character", came to the UK in the late-1920s to work in law, but instead pursued a career in real estate. Siffre's maternal grandfather was from Barbados, while his maternal grandmother was "a Northern lass".

Siffre was brought up in Bayswater and Hampstead and educated at a Catholic independent day school, St Benedict's School, in Ealing, West London.

Siffre states that his first connection to music was while his family were living at 18 Pembridge Crescent in Notting Hill and heard "One for My Baby (and One More for the Road)" by Frank Sinatra:

I'd never heard anything like this; it really was overpowering. I absolutely understood that [the narrator] was somebody who had had love, through his own stupidity he'd thrown it all away and he was drowning his sorrows. I'm 10 or 11 years of age and I understood that. That was what poleaxed me. I played that track continuously for 2 or 3 weeks - I just couldn't get away from it. I knew this thing, which was music, was going to be really important to me.

He went on to study music at the Eric Gilder School of Music in Wardour Street, Soho, London. Gilder is remembered with gratitude in Siffre's poem "education education education".

After leaving school, Siffre worked as a taxi driver and a deliveryman, before deciding to concentrate on music.

== Career ==
Siffre played jazz guitar at Annie Ross's jazz club in Soho, London, in the 1960s as part of a Hammond organ, guitar, drums house band.

He signed to Pye International in 1970 and released his debut solo album in the same year, featuring a cover of the Bee Gees' 1968 top-10 single "Words", and the Harry Nilsson song "Maybe". The album produced the singles "A Little More Line" and "Too Late", but neither the singles nor the album charted in the UK.

His sophomore album, The Singer and The Song, was released the following year, reaching No. 47 on the UK Albums Chart. The album features exclusively Siffre's own compositions, including the singles "Thank Your Lucky Star", which failed to chart. The album also features "Bless The Telephone", which would go viral on social media over half a century after its original release. A non-album single, "Get To The Country", peaked at No. 53.

In 1972, Siffre had two hit singles from his third album Crying Laughing Loving Lying: "It Must Be Love", which reached No. 14, and the title track, which reached No. 11. The album itself reached No. 46 on the UK Albums Chart. Both singles were issued in the US on the Bell Records label, however both failed to chart or create a commercial impact for Siffre. A non-album single, "Watch Me" reached No. 29 in the UK.

1973 saw the release of For The Children, which produced the singles "Give Love" and "If You Have Faith", though both singles and the album failed to chart in the UK.

In 1975, Siffre signed with EMI Records and released two albums that year, the funk/soul inspired Remember My Song, and Happy, which saw him implement both the funk/soul heard on Remember My Song, and the singer-songwriter style of his earlier albums. The latter album featured backing vocals from Jackie Sullivan, who Siffre would go on to form the short lived duo, Labi and Jackie, with. They released one single together in 1980, which did not chart in the UK.

Siffre's singles released on EMI were: "Dreamer" (1974), "Another Year", "Love-A-Love-A-Love-A-Love-A-Love" and "Second Time Around" (1975), "Staride To Nowhere" (1976), and "You've Got A Hold On Me" and "Do The Best You Can" (1977), none of which charted in the UK.

In 1978, Siffre took part in the heats to represent the UK in the Eurovision Song Contest. He performed "Solid Love", co-written with Tom Shapiro, which placed fifth of the 12 songs up for consideration at the A Song for Europe contest. Additionally, he co-wrote the song "We Got It Bad", performed by Bob James, which came in 10th. "Solid Love" was issued as a single on EMI, but failed to chart.

In 1981, British ska band Madness covered Siffre's 1971 single, "It Must Be Love". It reached No. 4 on the UK Singles Chart and went Platinum for selling 600,000 copies. Siffre makes a cameo appearance in the music video for Madness' cover, as a violin player.

Although Siffre continued to regularly perform live, and sporadically release singles in the early 1980s ("Run To Him", released in 1981, and "Nightmare", released in 1982), it was not until 1988 that he released another album, So Strong. Inspired by what he had seen in a 1985 television film from Apartheid South Africa, showing a white soldier shooting at black children, Siffre wrote "(Something Inside) So Strong".

Initially reluctant to record it himself, Siffre was adamant that it was to be sung by a black artist. He said:

It took us 18 months to get it recorded, because nobody wanted to touch it; they considered it to be too political. I'd actually decided that I wanted to quit the music business, and I didn't want to record it. I knew that it had to be recorded by somebody black, and I couldn't find anyone black to record it.

Eventually, Siffre was persuaded by Derek Green of China Records to record it, and on release, the single reached No. 4 in the UK, and even marked Siffre's first appearance on a US chart, where it peaked at No. 49 on the Billboard Hot Black Singles. The song remains his highest-charting single in any territory. Further singles from So Strong were: "Nothin's Gonna Change" (No. 52, 1987) and "Listen To The Voices" (No. 81, 1988). "I Will Always Love You" and "And The Wind Blows", also from the So Strong album, were released as singles in 1989, neither of which charted.

In 1991, Man Of Reason was released, an album that explored more contemporary styles of R&B. After a period of around 5 years of touring and playing festivals, Siffre released The Last Songs in 1998. It was a live album that collected recordings from the tour of the same name.

In October 2015, Siffre appeared on an episode of Later... with Jools Holland, performing a solo piano rendition of "(Something Inside) So Strong", and also appeared on The One Show, performing a solo piano rendition of "It Must Be Love". On 8 November of the same year, Siffre played his first full-length concert performance since January 1999, at the Leicester Square Theatre, and alluded to possible future live performances.

In May 2020, in reaction to Pride events globally being cancelled due to the COVID-19 pandemic, Siffre released "(Love Is Love Is Love) Why Isn't Love Enough?", a re-working of a track from The Last Songs.

On 16 February 2026, Siffre released "Far Away". On the same day, he performed at BBC Maida Vale Studios with the BBC Concert Orchestra as part of Radio 2's Piano Room Month, where he announced his first album in 27 years, Unfinished Business, set to release later in the year.

== Legacy ==
"(Something Inside) So Strong" is often considered one of the most defining cultural and political anthems of all-time. It has been used in many contexts, including the anti-apartheid movement, vigils and memorials for politically-charged attacks and hate crimes, and as part of the Black Lives Matter movement. In 2001, Siffre performed the song at the South Africa Freedom Day Concert in Trafalgar Square with the SA/UK Youth Choir.

Siffre has found success and a steady career resurgence through the sampling of his work by other artists. "I Got The...", the opening track from Remember My Song, was sampled in popular hip hop songs in the 1990s, including by Jay-Z in the song "Streets Is Watching" from his 1997 album In My Lifetime, Vol. 1 and most notably by Dr. Dre in the 1999 Eminem single "My Name Is". As a result of the song's newfound fame, it was finally released as a single in 2003. Siffre's 1972 track "My Song", from his album Crying Laughing Loving Lying, was sampled by rapper Kanye West on the song "I Wonder" on his 2007 album Graduation.

In 2020, a retrospective box set of Siffre's career was announced. Labi Siffre: My Song brought together all nine of Siffre's studio albums, together with 44 bonus tracks from across his career. To coincide with the box set's reissue in 2022, Siffre's life and work was made the subject of a BBC documentary, Labi Siffre: This Is My Song, as part of the Imagine series, directed by Alan Yentob.

In recent years, Siffre's music has had a resurgence, being used in a variety of films and television shows. "I Got The..." was featured in an episode of Better Call Saul, and "Cannock Chase" was featured in an episode of Hacks and over the closing credits of Sentimental Value. A live BBC recording of "Watch Me" was included in an episode of Doctor Who, something which Siffre described as "An accolade". Further, "Crying Laughing Loving Lying" was used in the soundtrack of The Holdovers, an Oscar-nominated film, which helped with "introducing Siffre to a new generation".

In 2025, "Bless The Telephone", an album track from The Singer and the Song, went viral online, further spurring on the Siffre revival, and becoming Siffre's most streamed song, with more than 100 million streams, as of 2026.

== Personal life ==
Siffre is openly gay, and has been throughout his career. He met his partner Peter Lloyd in July 1964 and they were together for 48 years, until Lloyd's death in 2013. In 1998, Lloyd suffered a stroke, immediately after which, Siffre decided to quit the music business to become Lloyd's full-time carer. They entered into a civil partnership in 2005, as soon as it was legally possible in the UK.

From the mid-1990s, Siffre and Lloyd lived in a polyamorous relationship with Rudolf van Baardwijk in the village of Cwmdu, near Crickhowell, South Wales.

Siffre and van Baardwijk married in December 2014. Van Baardwijk died in 2016.

In 2014, Siffre appeared on the BBC Radio 4 series Great Lives, championing the life of British author Arthur Ransome. Siffre said that Ransome's Swallows and Amazons books had taught him responsibility for his own actions and also a morality that has influenced and shaped him throughout his life.

As of 2022, Siffre lives in Spain.

Siffre is an atheist.

== Discography ==
=== Studio albums ===
Year	Album	UK
1970	Labi Siffre	—
1971	The Singer and the Song	47
1972	Crying Laughing Loving Lying	46
1973	For the Children	—
1975	Remember My Song	—
1975	Happy	—
1988	So Strong	—
1991	Man of Reason	—
1998	Monument (Spoken Word)	—
"—" denotes releases that did not chart.

=== Live albums ===
- The Last Songs (Re-mastered) (2006)

=== Compilation albums ===
- The Best of Labi Siffre (1995)
- It Must Be Love: The Best of Labi Siffre (2016)
- Gold (2019)
- Watch Me (2023)

=== Singles ===
Year	Single	Chart positions								Certifications
Year	Single	UK	AUS	AUT	BE (FLA)	IRE	NL 40	NL 100	US R&B	Certifications
1970	"Too Late"	—	—	—	—	—	—	—	—	
1970	"A Little More Line" (Germany-only release)	—	—	—	—	—	—	—	—	
1971	"Thank Your Lucky Star"	—	—	—	—	—	—	—	—	
1971	"Get to the Country"	53 (Note: Chart position is from the official UK "Breakers List".)	—	—	—	—	—	—	—	
1971	"It Must Be Love"	14	46	—	—	—	21	25	—	
1972	"Crying, Laughing, Loving, Lying"	11	—	—	—	—	—	— (Note: "Crying, Laughing, Loving, Lying" did not chart on the Single Top 100, but did reach No. 14 on the Single Tip chart.)	—	
1972	"Watch Me"	29	—	—	—	7	16	14	—	
1973	"Give Love"	—	—	—	—	—	—	—	—	
1973	"If You Have Faith"	—	—	—	—	—	—	—	—	
1973	"(Just) A Little More Line" (Netherlands-only release)	—	—	—	—	—	—	—	—	
1974	"Dreamer"	—	—	—	—	—	—	—	—	
1975	"Another Year	—	—	—	—	—	—	—	—	
1975	"Love-a-Love-a-Love-a-Love-a-Love"	—	—	—	—	—	—	—	—	
1975	"Second Time Around"	—	—	—	—	—	—	—	—	
1976	"Staride to Nowhere"	—	—	—	—	—	—	—	—	
1976	"You've Got a Hold on Me"	—	—	—	—	—	—	—	—	
1976	"Doctor Doctor" (France and Italy-only release)	—	—	—	—	—	—	—	—	
1977	"Do the Best You Can"	—	—	—	—	—	—	—	—	
1978	"Solid Love"	—	—	—	—	—	—	—	—	
1980	"One World Song" (as Labi and Jackie)	—	—	—	—	—	—	—	—	
1981	"Run to Him"	—	—	—	—	—	—	—	—	
1982	"Nightmare"	—	—	—	—	—	—	—	—	
1987	"(Something Inside) So Strong"	4	76	—	14	2	3	4	49	BPI: Silver
1987	"Nothin's Gonna Change"	52	—	—	8	—	21	24	—	
1988	"Listen to the Voices"	81	—	5	25	—	23	22	—	
1989	"I Will Always Love You"	—	—	—	—	—	—	—	—	
1989	"And the Wind Blows"	—	—	—	—	—	—	—	—	
1991	"Most People Sleep Alone"	—	—	—	—	—	—	—	—	
1991	"A Matter of Love	—	—	—	—	—	—	—	—	
1991	"City of Dreams" (promo only)	—	—	—	—	—	—	—	—	
2003	"I Got The..."	—	—	—	—	—	—	—	—	
2020	"(Love Is Love Is Love) Why Isn't Love Enough?"	—	—	—	—	—	—	—	—	
2026	"Far Away"	—	—	—	—	—	—	—	—	
"—" denotes releases that did not chart or were not released in that territory.

== Notable cover versions and samples of Siffre's songs ==
- "It Must Be Love" was covered by Madness in 1981. The song reached Number 4 in the UK chart, and Number 33 in the U.S. in 1983. Siffre also made a cameo appearance in the music video.
- "(Something Inside) So Strong" was covered by singer Michael Ball in 1996, reaching Number 40 in the UK. Rik Waller also covered the song while a contestant on Pop Idol, hitting Number 25 in the UK Singles Chart in 2002. Kenny Rogers had also covered the song in 1989 as the title track to an album.
- "My Song" was sampled by rapper Kanye West, also known as Ye, on his 2007 song "I Wonder" on the album Graduation. Siffre received a songwriting credit on the track as a result.
- "I Got The..." was sampled by producer Dr. Dre for rapper Eminem's 1999 breakout single, "My Name Is" from the album The Slim Shady LP. Siffre initially denied the duo permission to use the sample, based on his objection to homophobic and misogynistic lyrical content in the song, but ultimately agreed to let them release the record having heard only the song's clean version.

== Bibliography ==
=== Poetry ===
- Nigger (Xavier Books 1993)
- Blood on the Page (Xavier Books 1995)
- Monument (Xavier Books 1997)

=== Plays ===
- DeathWrite (Xavier Books 1997)

=== Essays ===
- Choosing the Stick They Beat You With (Penguin 2000)

== See also ==
- List of atheists in music
