= List of songs dedicated to association football =

These are lists of songs dedicated to association football or composed for clubs or players.

== Songs inspired by international football tournaments ==
- ’54, ’74, ’90, ’2006 by Sportfreunde Stiller (2006)
- 1966 And All That by Half Man Half Biscuit (1986)
- A Taça do Mundo é Nossa by Wagner Maugeri, Lauro Müller, Maugeri Sobrinho and Victor Dagô (1958)
- Al Sur del Mundo by Noche de Brujas (official song of Copa América 2015) (2015)
- All the Way by the England national football team featuring the 'sound' of Stock, Aitken and Waterman (1988)
- Allez Allez Allez by Sergio (2000)
- Ally's Tartan Army by Andy Cameron (1977)
- Alt for Norge by Drillos (1994)
- As Dick me hullep nodig heb by Johan & de Groothandel (1994)
- Back Home by the 1970 England World Cup squad (1970)
- Bir Oluruz Yolunda by Tarkan (2002)
- Brazil by Declan McKenna (2015)
- Brazil 70 by The Rebels Of Tijuana (2017)
- Buenos Dias Argentina by Udo Jürgens and the Germany national football team (1978)
- Campione 2000 by E-Type (2000)
- Carnaval de Paris by Dario G (1998)
- Celebrate the Day by Herbert Grönemeyer ft. Amadou et Mariam (official song of the 2006 FIFA World Cup) (2006)
- Come Alive by Ahmed Chawki featuring RedOne (official song of FIFA Club World Cup 2014) (2014)
- Come On England by 4-4-2 (2004)
- Creo en América by Diego Torres (official song of Copa América 2011) (2011)
- Coração Verde e Amarelo by Aerobanda (1994)
- De Mondiale by Rocco en de Micro's (1990)
- De Rode Duivels gaan naar Spanje by Will Tura (1982)
- De Rode Duivels gaan naar Mexico by Will Tura (1986)
- De Rode Duivels gaan naar Rome by Will Tura (1990)
- Don't Come Home Too Soon by Del Amitri (1998)
- Don't Mention the World Cup by The First Eleven with John Cleese (2006)
- É Tuga ou Nada by Sam The Kid, Sir Scratch, Gson, Bispo & Papillon (2026)
- E viva Mexico by Grand Jojo (1984)
- Easy Easy by the Scotland national football team (1974)
- El Equipo Tricolor by 1986 Mexico national football team (1986)
- El Mundial by The Ennio Morricone Orchestra (1978)
- El Rock del Mundial by Los Ramblers (1962)
- Endless Summer by Oceana (official song of Euro 2012) (2012)
- England's Irie by Black Grape ft. Joe Strummer and Keith Allen (1996)
- Eu Quero Tchu, Eu Quero Tcha by Joao Lucas & Marcelo (2012)
- Far Away in America by the Germany national football team and the Village People (1994)
- Festa by Ivete Sangalo (2001)
- Football Is Our Religion by Rednex (2008)
- Football is my life by Leo Aberer and Shaggy (2012)
- Força by Nelly Furtado (official song of UEFA Euro 2004) (2003)
- Fussball Ist Unser Leben by the 1974 West Germany national football team (1974)
- Gimme Hope Joachim by Basta (2010)
- Gol by Cali & El Dandee (2011)
- Gol by Ana Tijoux (2007)
- Green and Gold (Song for the Socceroos) by Freedom of Thought (2006)
- Grito Mundial by Daddy Yankee (2009)
- Hand in hand achter Oranje by the Netherlands national football team, Ron Brandsteder en De Havenzangers (1990)
- Hola, Hola (L'hymne de la CAN 2015) by Molare, Toofan, Eddy Kenzo, Singuila, Cano and Wizboyy (official song of the 2015 Africa Cup of Nations) (2015)
- (How Does It Feel to Be) On Top of the World by England United (2006)
- Hup Holland hup by Jan de Cler (1950)
- Hurry Up England by Sham 69 and The Special Assembly (2006)
- Ik heb u lief mijn Nederland by André Hazes and the Netherlands national football team (1994)
- Imaginate viene Messi por aquí by Toch
- In med bollen by Markoolio (2004)
- (Is This the Way to) The World Cup by Tony Christie (2006)
- Jugador del año by Trueno, Acru and Bizarrap (2020)
- La Copa América by Dj Méndez (2015)
- La Copa de Todos by Wisin, Paty Cantú and David Corey (2013)
- Lap of Honour by London Stadium Orchestra (1970)
- Larger than Life by Armin van Buuren and Chef'Special (2024)
- Love Generation by Bob Sinclar (2005)
- Magic In The Air by Magic System featuring Chawki (2014)
- Majesteit by Youp van 't Hek and Guus Meeuwis (2010)
- Mera mål by Markoolio (2000)
- Mexico mi amor by Peter Alexander and the German national football team (1986)
- Mostra tua força Brasil by Paulo Miklos and Fernanda Takai (2014)
- När vi gräver guld i USA by Glenmark Eriksson Strömstedt (1994)
- Nederland die heeft de bal by André van Duin (1980)
- No Scotland No Party by Nick Morgan (2024)
- Numero Uno (Luca Toni) by Matze Knop (2009)
- Oh Africa by Akon (2010)
- Olé España by Michael Schanze and the German national football team (1982)
- Ole Ola (Mulher Brasileira) by the Scotland national football team and Rod Stewart (1978)
- On Va La Foutre Au Fond by Sébastien Patoche (2014)
- Ona Kayako (Chipolopolo 2012) by MC Wabwino featuring Utaka (2012)
- Papa Éssa Brasil by Michael Sullivan and Paulo Massadas (1990)
- Pasadena 1994 by Nanowar of Steel ft. Joakim Brodén (2023)
- Pie De Oro Llegó by La Banda del Tigre Ariel (2007)
- ¡Podemos España! (2008)
- Pra Frente Brasil by Miguel Gustavo (1970)
- Povo Feliz (Voa, Canarinho) by Júnior (1982)
- Put 'Em Under Pressure by the Republic of Ireland Football Squad (1990)
- Qué Es Dios by Las Pastillas Del Abuelo (2008)
- Que El Futbol No Pare by Patricia Manterola (2002)
- Quiero Verte Ganar by Tomo Como Rey (2009)
- Ramenez la coupe à la maison by Vegedream (2018)
- Rendez-Vous 98 by Jean Michel Jarre featuring Apollo 440 (1998)
- Say It with Pride by the Scotland national football team (1990)
- Schwarz und Weiß - Oliver Pocher (2006)
- Sela Sela (Dance Together) by Zahra Universe & Wes (official song of the 2013 Africa Cup of Nations) (2013)
- Sevillanas del Mundial '82 by Pepe da Rosa (1982)
- Simplemente Fútbol by La Mosca
- Song for Bafana Bafana by Chanku (2010)
- Somos um só by Aerobanda and Tavito (2014)
- Stand Up! (Champions Theme) by Patrizio Buanne (2006)
- Steh auf, mach laut by Höhner (2014)
- Superstars by Pitbull featuring Becky G (official song of Copa América Centenario) (2016)
- 't Is weer fijn langs de lijn by Harry Slinger and the Netherlands national football team (1985)
- Ta fête by Stromae (2014)
- Tempo de Alegria by Ivete Sangalo (2014)
- The Boys in Green by The Republic Of Ireland Soccer Squad (1998)
- The Cup of Life by Ricky Martin (official song of the 1998 FIFA World Cup) (1998)
- The World at their Feet by John Shakespeare Orchestra (1970)
- This One's For You by David Guetta featuring Zara Larsson (official song of Euro 2016) (2016)
- This Time (We'll Get It Right) by the England national football team (1982)
- Three Lions by Baddiel, Skinner and The Lightning Seeds (1996)
- Toco y me voy by Bersuit Vergarabat (2000)
- Tous ensemble by Johnny Hallyday (2002)
- Un'estate italiana by Edoardo Bennato and Gianna Nannini (official song of the 1990 FIFA World Cup) (1990)
- Un Sueño by Nicky Jam (2015)
- Vai Meu Brasil by Fia Fer (2014)
- Vai Na Fé by Edcity, Ronaldinho (2013)
- Vai Portugal by Kika (2014)
- Vem Pra Rua by Marcelo Falcão (2013)
- Vida by Ricky Martin (2014)
- Vindaloo by Fat Les (1998)
- Viva Hollandia by Wolter Kroes (2010)
- Waka Waka (This Time for Africa) by Shakira featuring Freshlyground (official song of the 2010 FIFA World Cup) (2010)
- Warrior by Oscar and the Wolf (2022)
- Wavin' Flag by K'naan (2009)
- We Are One (Ole Ola) by Pitbull featuring Jennifer Lopez and Claudia Leitte (official song of the 2014 FIFA World Cup) (2014)
- We gaan naar Rome by Willy Derby (1934)
- We gon nor Mexico by De Strangers (1985)
- We Have a Dream by the Scotland national football team (1982)
- We're on the Ball by Ant & Dec (2002)
- We've Got the Whole World at Our Feet by the England national football team (1986)
- Wij houden van Oranje by André Hazes (1998)
- Who Do You Think You Are Kidding Jurgen Klinsmann? by Tonedef All Stars (2006)
- World at Your Feet by Embrace (2006)
- World Cup Fanfare by Werner Drexler (1974)
- World Cup Willie by Lonnie Donegan (1966)
- World in Motion by New Order (1990)
- Yalla Asia by Jay Sean featuring Karl Wolf (2011)
- Zelena je trava by Trawa jest zielona (2010)

== Songs dedicated to clubs ==
- 100. Yıl Albümü (an album following the Turkish League triumph of Beşiktaş in 2003 and their 100th year of foundation)
- Ajax is kampioen by Danny Lukassen (1995)
- All I Want for Christmas Is a Dukla Prague Away Kit by Half Man Half Biscuit (1986)
- Anderlecht champion by Grand Jojo (1985)
- Anfield Rap by Liverpool F.C. (1988)
- Arsenal Number One by Arsenal F.C. (2000)
- Bayern by Die Toten Hosen (2000)
- Blue Day by Suggs (1997)
- Blue Is the Colour by The Chelsea Football Team (1972)
- Blue Tomorrow by Chelsea F.C. (2000)
- Bluebirds Flying High by James Fox with Cardiff City F.C. (2008)
- Cant del Barça by Jaume Picas and Josep Maria Espinàs (lyrics) and Manuel Valls (music) (1974)
- Come On You Reds by Manchester United football squad ft. Status Quo (1994)
- Dit is mijn club by Kees Prins (1997)
- Eenmaal zullen wij de kampioenen zijn (FC Twente) by Eddy Achterberg (1974)
- Feyenoord, Feyenoord (wat gaan we doen vandaag?) by Cock van der Palm (1992)
- Galatasaray SK Marşı by Mehmet Faruk Gürtunca and Selmi Andak (1980)
- Glasgow Rangers (Nine in a Row) by Glasgow Rangers (1997)
- Go for It by The Coventry City F.A. Cup Squad (1987)
- Good Old Arsenal by Arsenal F.C. (1971)
- Habebi Barchaloni (حبيبي برشلوني) by Hussain Al Jassmi (2012)
- Hala Madrid y nada más by Real Madrid featuring RedOne (official song for Real Madrid's tenth UEFA Champions League title) (2014)
- Hand in hand, kameraden by Jacky van Dam (1961)
- Hot Shot Tottenham! by Chas & Dave and the Tottenham Hotspur 1987 FA Cup Final squad (1987)
- Ik spring voor NAC by Evert van Huygevoort (2017)
- Leeds, Leeds, Leeds (Marching on Together) by Leeds United FC (1972)
- Leeds United by Leeds United FC (1972)
- Lift it High (All About Belief) by Manchester United F.C. (1999)
- Liverpool (We're Never Gonna...) by Liverpool F.C. (1983)
- Manchester United by Manchester United F.C. (1976)
- Met heel mijn hart by Jack van Raamsdonk (2014)
- Merah Kuning by Selangor
- Mer stonn zo dir, FC Kölle by Höhner (1998)
- Move Move Move (The Red Tribe) by Manchester United F.C. (1996)
- No One Can Stop Us Now by Chelsea F.C. (1994)
- One For The Bristol City by The Wurzels (1977)
- Ossie's Dream (Spurs Are on Their Way to Wembley) by Chas & Dave and the Tottenham Hotspur 1981 FA Cup Final squad (1981)
- Pass & Move (It's the Liverpool Groove) by Liverpool F.C. and the Boot Room Boyz (1996)
- Schwarz-weiß wie Schnee by Tankard (1999)
- Shouting for the Gunners by Arsenal F.C. with Tippa Irie and Peter Hunnigale (1993)
- Sitting on Top of the World by Liverpool F.C. (1986)
- Song for Pride by Persebaya
- Sparta Marsch by Jaap Blazer (1909)
- Stuttgart kommt by Wolle Kriwanek (1996)
- The Boys in the Old Brighton Blue by The Seagulls (1983)
- The Celtic Song by Glen Daly (1961)
- Tottenham, Tottenham by Chas & Dave and Tottenham Hotspur 1982 FA Cup Final squad (1982)
- United (We Love You) by Manchester United (1993)
- Voor Ajax by Sophie Straat (2021)
- Vur welleke club (bende gai?) by Vender's Breakfast (1999)
- We All Follow Man United by Manchester United (1985)
- We Can Do It by Liverpool F.C. (1977)
- We're Gonna Do It Again by Manchester United F.C. ft. Stryker (1995)
- When the Year Ends in One by Tottenham Hotspur F.C. and Chas & Dave (1991)
- Wij zijn Ajax by Ajax and Friends (2012)
- Yeovil True by Yeovil Town F.C. (2004)

== Songs dedicated to football players ==
- Baggio Baggio - Lucio Dalla (2001)
- Baila Como El Papu - Gli Autogol, DJ Matrix (2017)
- El Pistolero by Resk-T (2014)
- La Mano De Dios by Rodrigo (2000)
- Lu Lu Lu Lukas Podolski Song (2010)
- Maradona by Andres Calamaro (1999)
- Nice one Cyril by Cockerel Chorus (1973)
- Saint Maximinazs
- Santa Maradona by Mano Negra (1994)
- Strachan by The Hitchers
- Thiago Silva by Dave (2016)
- Will Griggs on Fire - DJ Kenno (2016)
- Who's da Man by Elias featuring Frans (2006)
- Zinedine Zidane by Vaudeville Smash and Les Murray (2014)
- Zlatan by Sanjin and Youthman (2017)

== Other songs dedicated to football ==
- #Futebol by DJ Alpha featuring Séan Garnier & Les Francis (2014)
- Beautiful Goal by Paul Oakenfold (2006)
- Bring en hei by Baschi (2006)
- De Voetbalmatch by Louis Davids (1926)
- Goleador by Samba Tri
- Koning Voetbal Mars by Willy Schootemeijer (1934)
- J.O.S. Days by Nits (1988)
- La leva calcistica della classe '68 by Francesco De Gregori (1982)
- Långa bollar på Bengt by Svenne Rubins (1992)
- Meu Mundo é uma Bola by Sérgio Mendes and Pelé (1977)
- Overhead Kick by T-Square (1986)
- País do Futebol by MC Guime featuring Emicida (2013)
- Ponta de Lança Africano (Umbabarauma) by Jorge Ben Jor (1976)
- Simplemente Fútbol by Axel (2013)
- Stille Willem by Henk Spaan en Harry Vermeegen (1981)
- The Name Of the Game (Olé, Olé, Olé!!) by The Fans (1988)
- The Referee’s Alphabet by Half Man Half Biscuit (2002)

== Anthems ==
- FIFA Anthem by Franz Lambert (1994)
- AFC Anthem by Lee Dong-june (Asian Football Confederation Official Anthem) (2014)
- A Song of Joy by Miguel Ríos (Copa Libertadores Anthem) (1969)
- UEFA Champions League Anthem by Tony Britten (1992)
- Ode to Joy by Ludwig van Beethoven (UEFA European Qualifiers Official Anthem)

== See also ==
- Football chant
- List of FIFA World Cup official songs
- List of FIFA Women's World Cup songs and anthems
- List of UEFA European Championship songs and anthems
- List of Copa América songs and anthems
- List of Africa Cup of Nations songs and anthems
- List of AFC Asian Cup songs and anthems
