= List of UK hit singles by footballers =

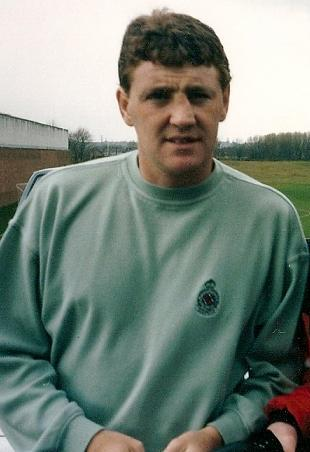
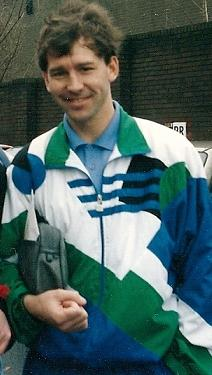
Steve Bruce and Bryan Robson were among the Manchester United players who sang on "Come on You Reds" in 1994, the first song by a club team to top the charts.

Professional association football players have released records in the United Kingdom since at least the 1930s, when the Arsenal team issued a now-collectible gramophone disc. The first such record to achieve commercial success was "Back Home", released by the England national team as part of their build-up to the 1970 FIFA World Cup, at which they would defend the trophy they had won four years earlier. The single, written by Bill Martin and Phil Coulter, spent 17 weeks in the UK Singles Chart and reached number one on the chart dated 16 May. The Scotland national team had hits in 1974 and 1978 with singles released ahead of the World Cup, on the latter occasion teaming up with celebrity fan Rod Stewart. England topped the charts again in 1990 with the single "World in Motion", recorded in collaboration with the band New Order and remembered for the rap performed by player John Barnes.

From the 1970s onwards, it became a tradition for the two teams which had reached the final of the FA Cup to each release a single as part of the build-up to the match, and several of these reached the top 10. The songs were often adapted from existing well-known recordings, such as Middlesbrough's 1997 hit "Let's Dance", which added new lyrics to a 1987 song by Chris Rea, and were characterised by their "rowdy, altogether-now" style. Several different teams recorded songs written by Ivor Novello Award-winning songwriter Tony Hiller. The first FA Cup final single to reach number one was "Come on You Reds", released in 1994 by Manchester United. The single, adapted from the song "Burning Bridges" by Status Quo, who also performed on the recording, topped the charts on the weekend of United's victory over Chelsea in the final, but has been described as "so bad it's good". Although cup final singles have fallen out of fashion in recent years, Cardiff City collaborated with singer James Fox on a single to mark their appearance in the FA Cup final in 2008. Other clubs, such as Lincoln City, have released singles to raise money in times of financial difficulties.

In addition to the hits scored by teams singing en masse, individual professional players have also made appearances in the charts. Paul Gascoigne, then of Tottenham Hotspur, achieved the biggest hit by an individual player when he reached Number 2 with the single "Fog on the Tyne (Revisited)" in 1990. Two other Tottenham players, Glenn Hoddle and Chris Waddle, reached Number 12 in 1987 with the song "Diamond Lights", although the single is now mostly remembered for the dated fashions sported by the duo when they performed the song on Top of the Pops. Only a very small number of UK hit singles have been recorded by sportsmen other than footballers, including top 20 hits for the England national rugby union team in 1991 and the England national cricket team in 2005.

== Hits ==
The list contains every single recorded by a professional football team or individual player which spent at least one week in the UK top 75. It does not contain singles recorded in tribute to football teams by existing bands or groups of fans such as the 1975 hit "Viva El Fulham" by Tony Rees and the Cottagers, or other hits with a general football theme such as the four-time number one hit "Three Lions" by David Baddiel, Frank Skinner and The Lightning Seeds. Where two titles are shown for the same single, this represents a double A-side.

=== Hits recorded by teams ===
Year	Team	Co-credited performer(s)	Single	Chart peak	Weeks in top 75	Notes
1970	England national team	—	"Back Home"	1	17	
1971	Arsenal	—	"Good Old Arsenal"	16	7	
1972	Leeds United	—	"Leeds United"	10	10	
1972	Chelsea	—	"Blue is the Colour"	5	12	
1974	Scotland national team	—	"Easy Easy"	20	4	
1975	West Ham United	—	"I'm Forever Blowing Bubbles"	31	2	
1976	Manchester United	—	"Manchester United"	50	1	
1977	Liverpool	—	"We Can Do It"	15	4	
1978	Nottingham Forest	Paper Lace	"We've Got the Whole World in Our Hands"	24	6	
1978	Scotland national team	Rod Stewart	"Ole Ola (Mulher Brasileira)"	4	6	
1981	Tottenham Hotspur	—^{[A]}	"Ossie's Dream (Spurs Are On Their Way To Wembley)"	5	8	
1982	Tottenham Hotspur	—^{[A]}	"Tottenham, Tottenham"	19	7	
1982	Scotland national team	—	"We Have A Dream"	5	9	
1982	England national team	—	"This Time (We'll Get It Right)" / "England We'll Fly The Flag"	2	13	
1983	Liverpool	—	"Liverpool (We're Never Gonna...)" / "Liverpool Anthem"	54	4	
1983	Manchester United	—	"Glory Glory Man United"	6	5	
1983	Brighton & Hove Albion	—	"The Boys in the Old Brighton Blue"	65	2	
1985	Manchester United	—	"We All Follow Man United"	10	5	
1985	Everton	—	"Here We Go"	14	5	
1986	England national team	—	"We've Got The Whole World At Our Feet"	66	1	
1986	Liverpool	—	"Sitting on Top of the World"	50	2	
1987	Tottenham Hotspur	Chas & Dave	"Hot Shot Tottenham!"	18	5	
1987	Coventry City	—	"Go For It"	61	2	
1988	England national team	The "sound" of Stock Aitken & Waterman	"All The Way"	64	2	
1988	Liverpool	—	"Anfield Rap (Red Machine In Full Effect)"	3	6	
1990	Crystal Palace	The Fab Four	"Glad All Over" / "Where Eagles Fly"	50	2	
1990	England national team	New Order	"World in Motion"	1	12	
1990	Scotland national team	—	"Say It With Pride"	45	3	
1991	Tottenham Hotspur	—^{[A]}	"When the Year Ends in One"	44	3	
1992	Leeds United	—	"Leeds Leeds Leeds"	54	3	
1993	Manchester United	The Champions	"United (We Love You)"	37	2	
1993	Arsenal	Tippa Irie and Peter Hunnigale	"Shouting for the Gunners"	34	3	
1994	Manchester United	—^{[B]}	"Come On You Reds"	1	15	
1994	Chelsea	—	"No One Can Stop Us Now"	23	3	
1995	Manchester United	Stryker	"We're Gonna Do It Again"	15	6	
1995	Everton	—	"All Together Now"	24	3	
1996	Manchester United	—	"Move Move Move (The Red Tribe)"	6	15	
1996	Liverpool	Boot Room Boyz	"Pass & Move (It's the Liverpool Groove)"	4	4	
1996	Scotland national team	Rod Stewart	"Purple Heather"	16	5	
1997	Rangers	—	"Glasgow Rangers (Nine in a Row)"	54	2	
1997	Chelsea	Suggs & Co.	"Blue Day"	22	5	
1997	Middlesbrough	Bob Mortimer and Chris Rea	"Let's Dance"	44	1	
1998	Arsenal	—	"Hot Stuff"	9	5	
1999	Manchester United	—	"Lift it High (All About Belief)"	11	5	
2000	Arsenal	—	"Arsenal Number One" / "Our Goal"	46	1	
2000	Chelsea	—	"Blue Tomorrow"	22	2	
2002	Lincoln City	Michael Courtney	"Chirpy Chirpy Cheep Cheep" / "Jagged End"	64	1	
2002	England national team	New Order	"World in Motion" (re-issue)	22	11	
2004	Yeovil Town	—	"Yeovil True"	36	1	
2004	Millwall	—	"Oh Millwall"	41	1	
2007	Bristol City	The Wurzels	"One for the Bristol City"	66	1	
2008	Cardiff City	James Fox	"Bluebirds Flying High"	15	2	
2010	Leeds United	Supporters	"Leeds Leeds Leeds"	10	1	
2020	Everton	—	"Spirit of the Blues"	65	1	

A. Chas & Dave performed on this single but were not credited.

B. Status Quo performed on this single but were not credited.

=== Hits recorded by individual players ===
Year	Team	Co-credited performer(s)	Single	Chart peak	Weeks in top 75	Notes
1979	Kevin Keegan	—	"Head over Heels in Love"	31	6	
1987	Glenn Hoddle and Chris Waddle (billed as "Glenn & Chris")	—	"Diamond Lights"	12	8	
1990	Paul Gascoigne (billed as "Gazza")	Lindisfarne	"Fog on the Tyne (Revisited)"	2	9	
1990	Paul Gascoigne (billed as "Gazza")	—	"Geordie Boys (Gazza Rap)"	31	5	
1993	Ian Wright	—	"Do the Right Thing"	43	2	
1999	Andy Cole	—	"Outstanding"	68	1	
