= Leeds United (disambiguation) =

Leeds United F.C. is an English football team.

Leeds United may also refer to:

- Leeds United F.C. Under-21s and Academy
- Leeds United W.F.C.
- "Leeds United" (song), a song recorded by the football team
- "Leeds United", a song on the album Who Killed Amanda Palmer by Amanda Palmer
- Leeds United!, a play in the BBC's Play for Today series, written by Colin Welland
