= Thirsty Work =

Studio album by Status Quo
- Released: 22 August 1994
- Recorded: 1994
- Studio: ARSIS
- Genre: Power pop, rock
- Length: 58:15
- Label: Polydor
- Producer: Francis Rossi

Status Quo chronology
Live Alive Quo (1992)	Thirsty Work (1994)	Don't Stop (1996)

Singles from Thirsty Work
- 1. "I Didn't Mean It" Released: 25 July 1994; 2. "Sherri, Don't Fail Me Now!" Released: 10 October 1994; 3. "Restless" Released: 21 November 1994

Professional ratings
Review scores
Source	Rating
AllMusic	2.5/5 stars
Music Week	4/5 stars

Thirsty Work is the twenty-first studio album by British rock band Status Quo. It yielded three hit singles, "I Didn't Mean It" (No. 21), "Sherri Don't Fail Me Now" (No. 38), and the uncharacteristic ballad "Restless" (No. 39). "Goin' Nowhere" was released as a single in Germany. "Sorry" had originally been recorded by Demis Roussos and released on his 1980 album Man of the World, with Francis Rossi and Bernie Frost on all instruments and backing vocals.

== Track listing ==
1. "Goin' Nowhere" (Francis Rossi, Bernie Frost, Tony McAnaney) – 3:50
2. "I Didn't Mean It" (John David) – 3:22
3. "Confidence" (Andy Bown) – 3:14
4. "Point of No Return" (Andy Bown, John Edwards) – 3:50
5. "Sail Away" (Francis Rossi, Bernie Frost) – 3:34
6. "Like It or Not" (Francis Rossi, Bernie Frost) – 4:01
7. "Soft in the Head" (Francis Rossi, Bernie Frost) – 3:20
8. "Queenie" (Francis Rossi, Bernie Frost) – 3:32
9. "Lover of the Human Race" (Francis Rossi, Andy Bown) – 3:32
10. "Sherri, Don't Fail Me Now!" (Andy Bown, John Edwards) – 3:20
11. "Rude Awakening Time" (Francis Rossi, Bernie Frost) – 4:12
12. "Back on My Feet" (Francis Rossi, Bernie Frost) – 3:06
13. "Restless" (Jennifer Warnes) – 4:10
14. "Ciao-Ciao" (Francis Rossi, Andy Bown) – 3:31
15. "Tango" (Francis Rossi, Bernie Frost) – 4:06
16. "Sorry" (Francis Rossi, Bernie Frost) – 3:28

=== 2006 remaster bonus tracks ===
1. "Survival" (Francis Rossi, Andy Bown)
2. "She Knew Too Much" (Francis Rossi, Andy Bown)
3. "Tossin & Turning" (Francis Rossi, Bernie Frost)
4. "Down To You" (Francis Rossi, Andy Bown)
5. "Beautiful" (Francis Rossi, Andy Bown)

== Personnel ==
Status Quo

- Francis Rossi – vocals, lead guitar
- Rick Parfitt – vocals, guitar
- John Edwards – bass
- Andy Bown – keyboards
- Jeff Rich – drums

Recorded at ARSIS Studios

== Charts ==
Chart (1994)	Peak position
Dutch Albums (Album Top 100)	87
German Albums (Offizielle Top 100)	87
Scottish Albums (OCC)	28
Swedish Albums (Sverigetopplistan)	6
Swiss Albums (Schweizer Hitparade)	10
UK Albums (OCC)	13
