= I Didn't Mean It =

1994 single by Status Quo

Single by Status Quo

from the album Thirsty Work
- Released: 25 July 1994
- Genre: Rock
- Length: 3:21
- Label: Polydor
- Songwriter(s): John David
- Producer(s): Francis Rossi

Status Quo singles chronology
"Come on You Reds" (1994)	"I Didn't Mean It" (1994)	"Sherri, Don't Fail Me Now" (1994)

"I Didn't Mean It" is a song by British rock band Status Quo, released in July 1994 by Polydor Records as the first single from the band's twenty-first studio album, Thirsty Work (1994). It was written by John David, produced by Francis Rossi and peaked at number 21 on the UK Singles Chart.

== Cover ==
On the cover, ten famous profiles are shown, who got into trouble with justice.

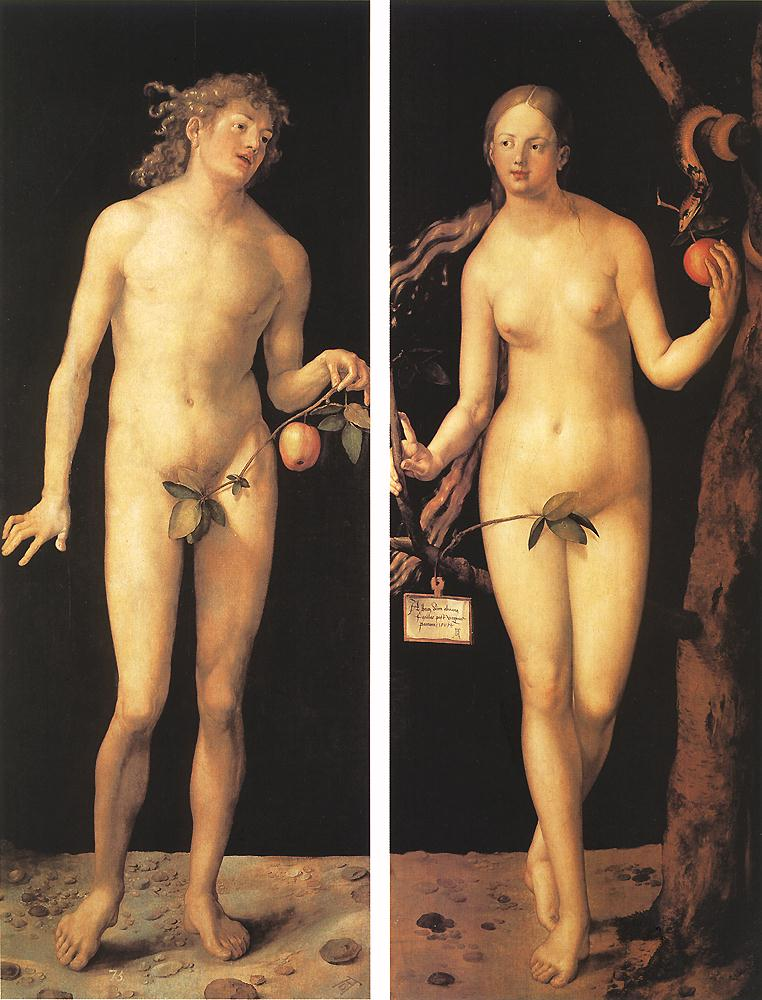
Adam and Eve

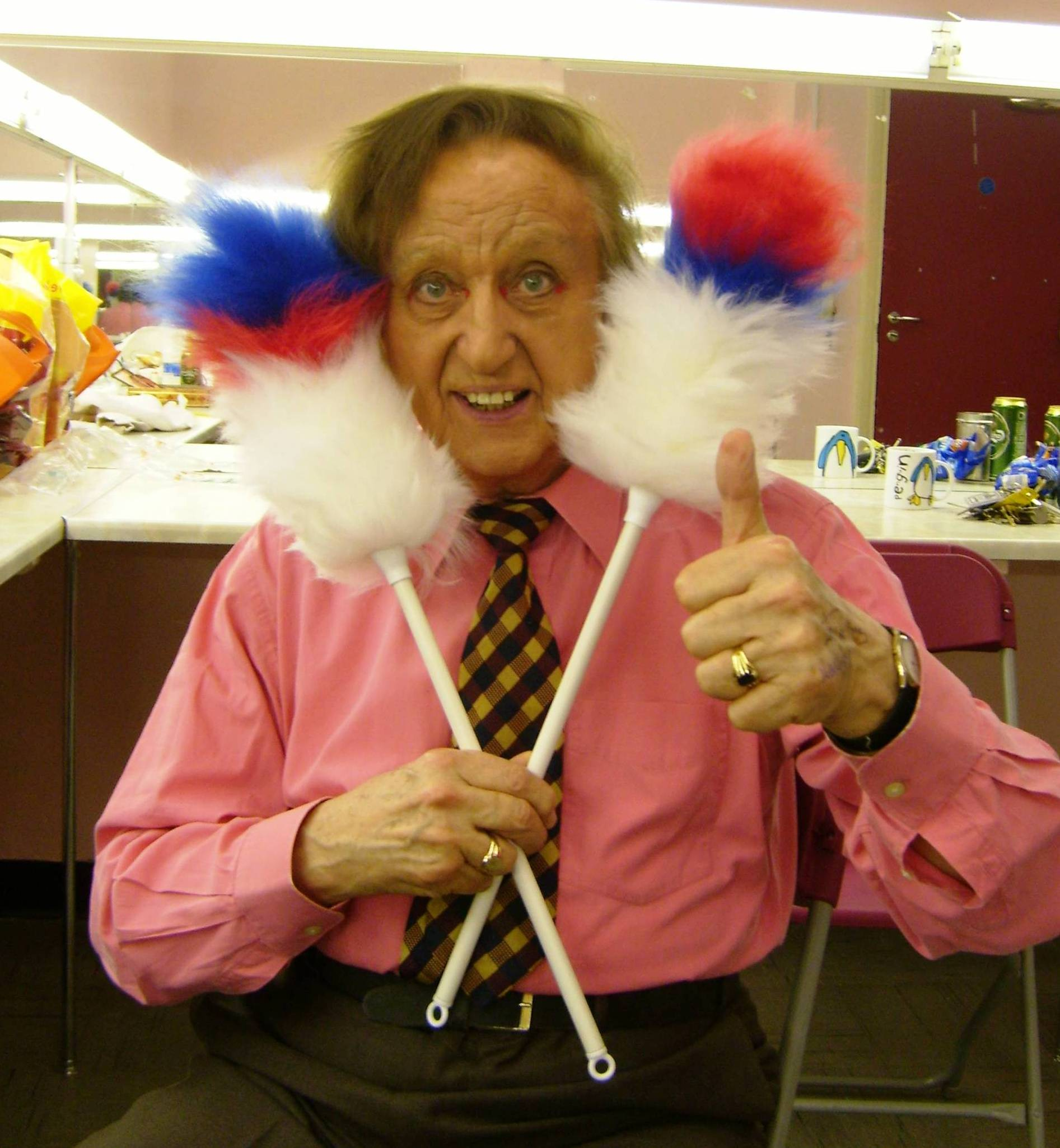
Ken Dodd

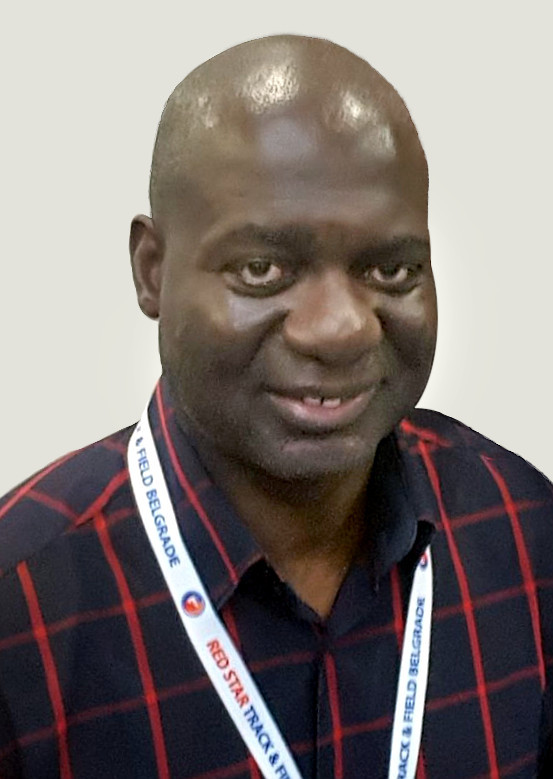
Ben Johnson

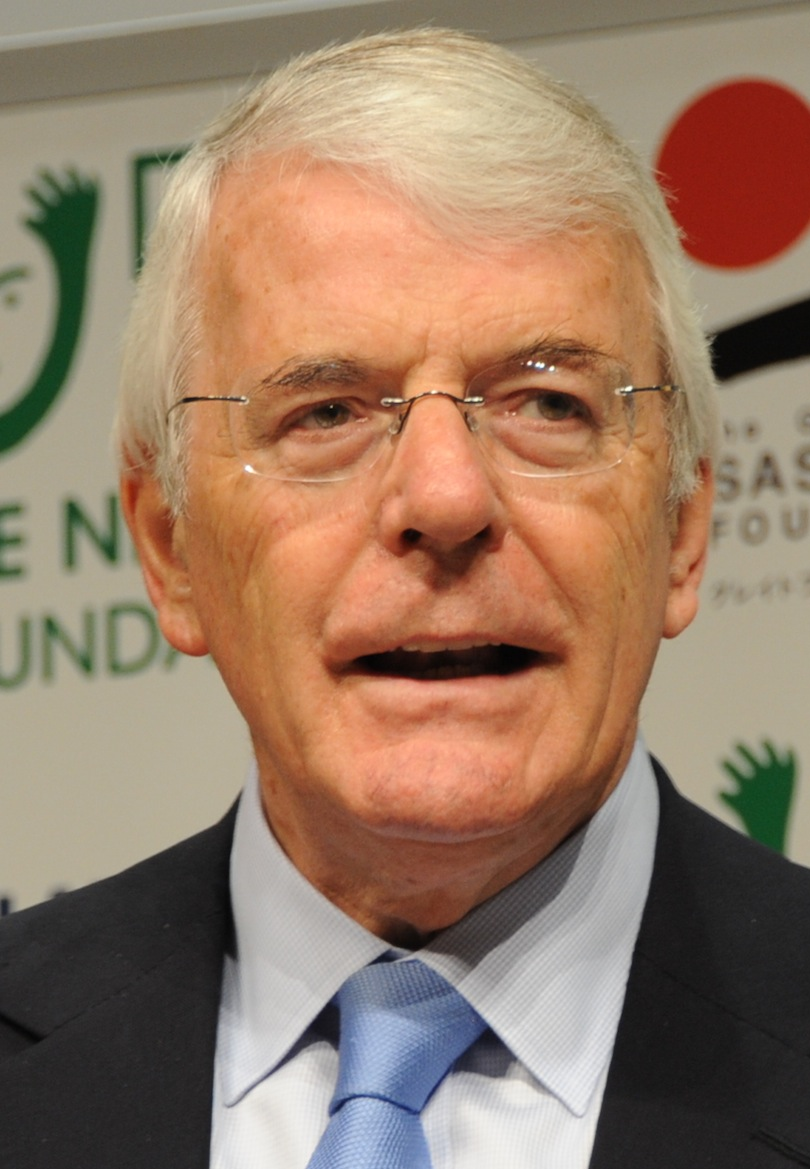
John Major

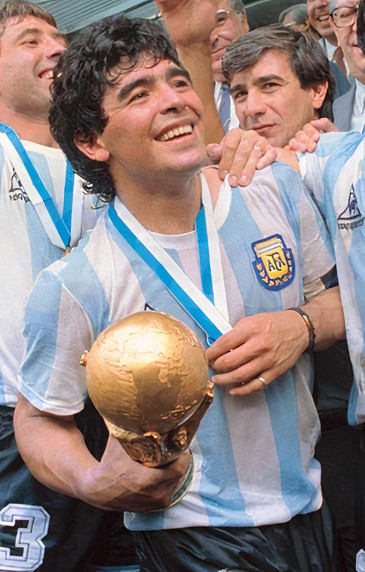
Diego Maradona

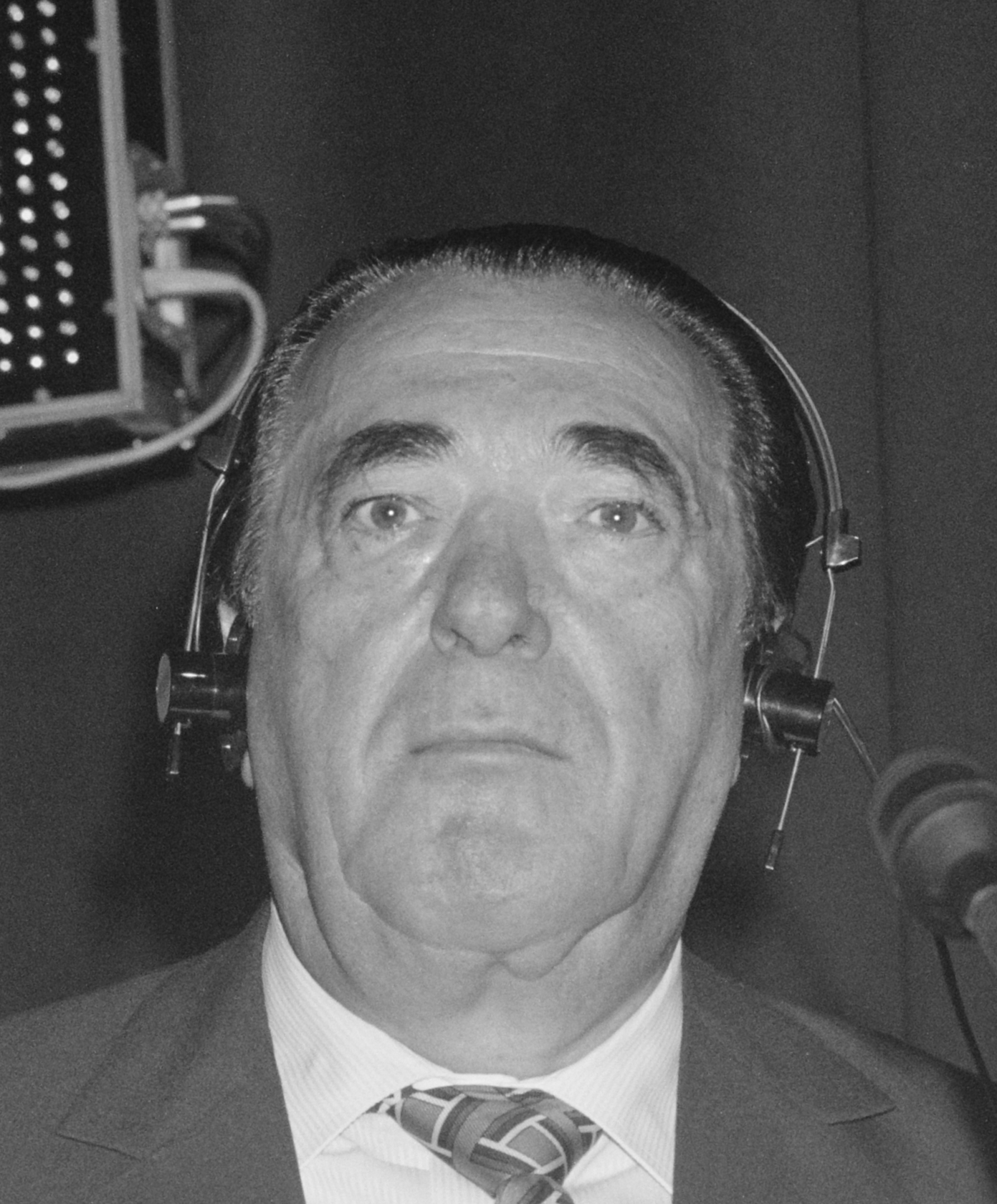
Robert Maxwell

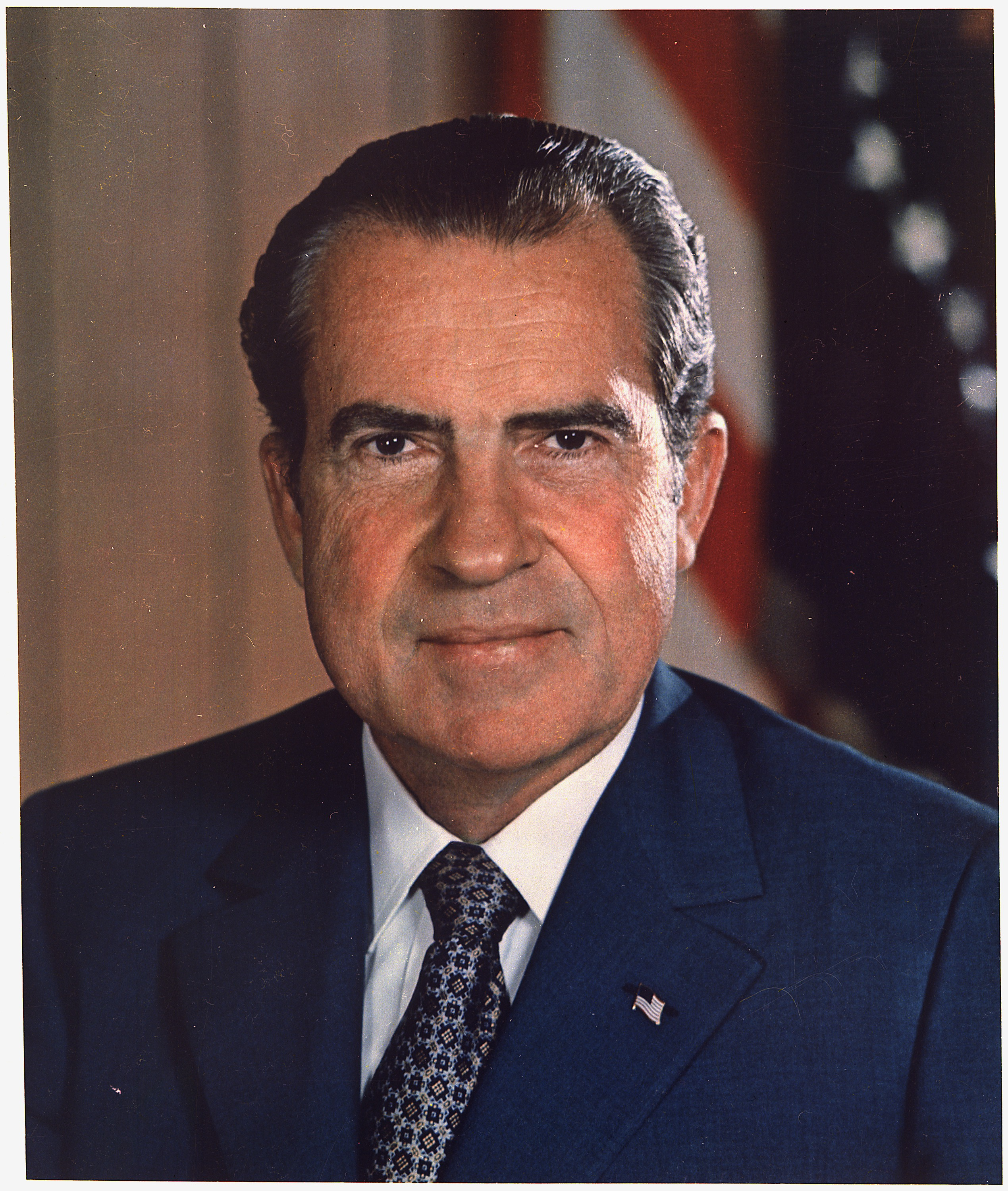
Richard Nixon

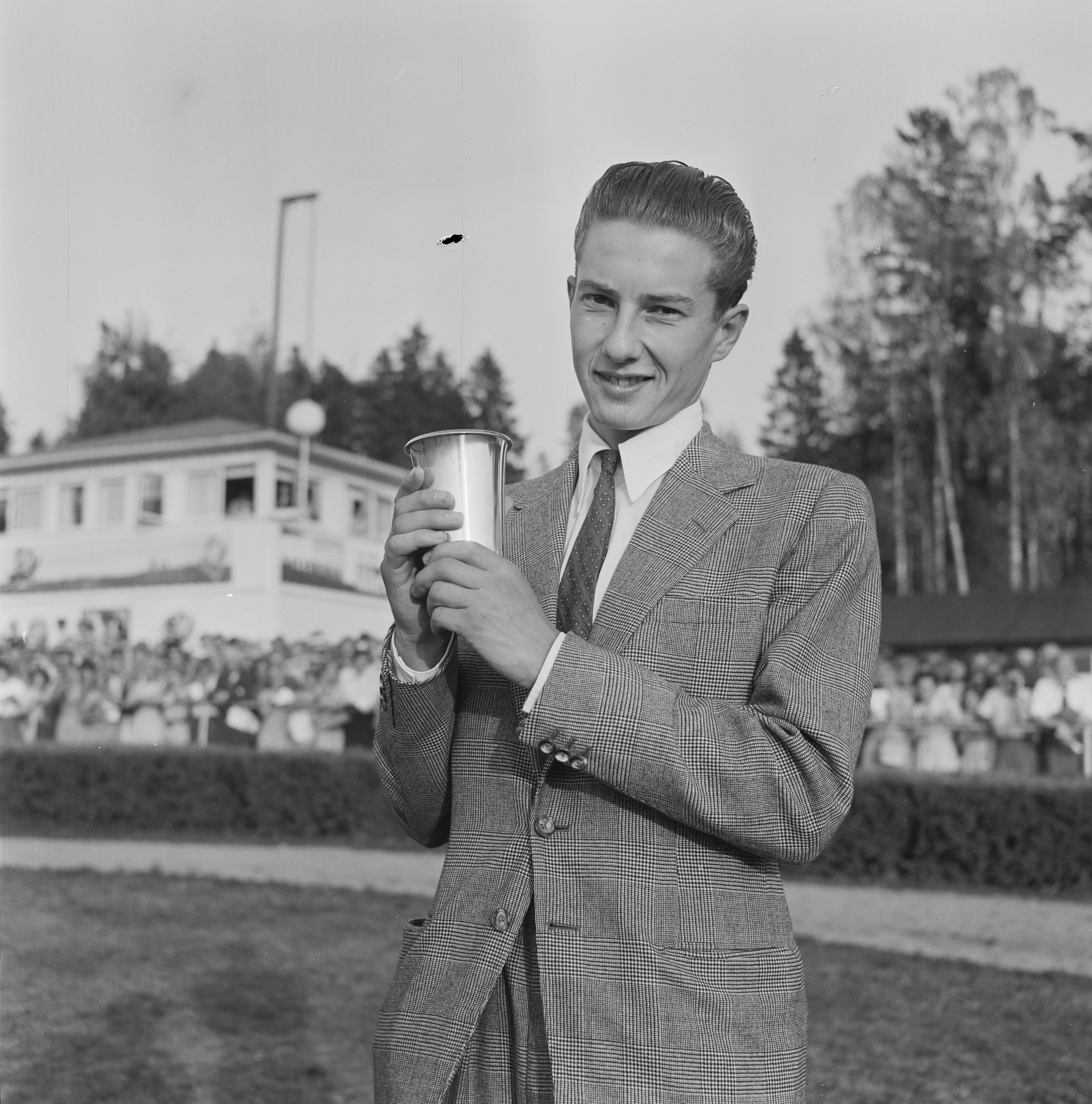
Lester Piggott

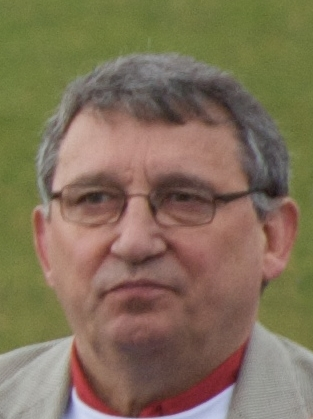
Graham Taylor

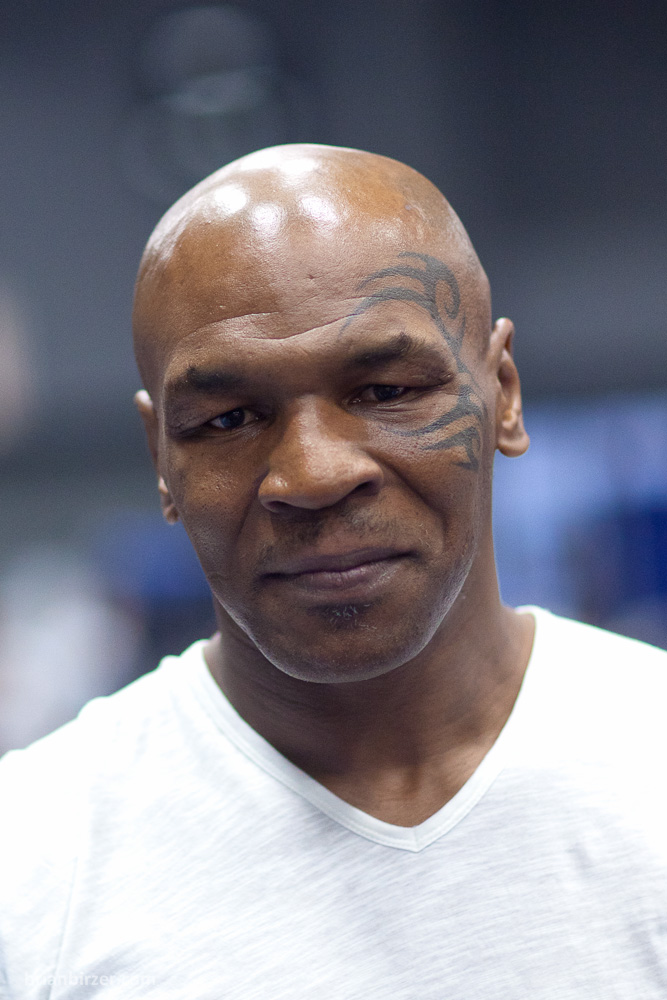
Mike Tyson

== Critical reception ==
Alan Jones from Music Week gave the song four out of five and named it Pick of the Week, writing, "Quo return in their own right, with a good-time boogie that could have been recorded at almost any time in the past 20 years. A large hit, then, especially as the CD is like a mini greatest hits package, with 'Whatever You Want', 'Down Down' and 'Rockin' All Over the World' included."

== Track listings ==
- Cassette and 7-inch blue vinyl
1. "I Didn't Mean It" (J David) (3.21)
2. "Whatever You Want" (Parfitt/Bown) (4:03)
- CD1
1. "I Didn't Mean It" (J David) (3.21)
2. "Whatever You Want" (Parfitt/Bown) (4:03) - Down Down (Rossi/Young) (3:50)
3. "Rockin' All Over The World" (J Fogerty) (3:38)
- CD2
1. "I Didn't Mean It" (Acoustic Version) (J David) (4.01)
2. "I Didn't Mean It" (Hooligan Version) (J David) (3.55)
3. "Survival" (Rossi/Bown) (3.24)
4. "She Knew Too Much" (Rossi/Bown) (3.45)

== Charts ==
Chart (1994)	Peak position
Ireland (IRMA)	23
Sweden (Sverigetopplistan)	21
UK Singles (OCC)	21
UK Airplay (Music Week)	38
