= I'm Restless =

"I'm Restless" initially debuted as a song performed by Jennifer Warnes, with its original release occurring in December 1979.

== Status Quo cover ==
"Restless"

Single by Status Quo

from the album Thirsty Work
- Released: 21 November 1994
- Genre: Rock
- Length: 4:08
- Label: Polydor
- Songwriter(s): Jennifer Warnes
- Producer(s): Francis Rossi

Status Quo singles chronology
"Sherri, Don't Fail Me Now!" (1994)	"Restless" (1994)	"When You Walk in the Room" (1995)

In a subsequent rendition, the British rock band Status Quo presented their own cover of "Restless" in 1994. This rendition was released as a single and found its place within the album Thirsty Work.

=== Track listing ===
==== 7 inch vinyl / Cassette ====
1. "Restless" (J Warnes) (4.08)
2. "And I Do" (Rossi/Frost/Macannany) (3.53)

==== 2CD set ====
- CD1
1. "Restless" (Orchestral Version) (J Warnes) (4.10)
2. "Something 'Bout You Baby (I Like)" (R Supa) (2.50)
3. "Caroline" (Rossi/Young) (3.43)
4. "Burning Bridges" (Live) (Rossi/Bown) (3.56)
- CD2
1. "Restless" (LP Version) (J Warnes) (4.08)
2. "And I Do" (Rossi/Frost/Macannany) (3.53)
3. "Democracy" (Leonard Cohen) (4.21)

== Charts ==
Chart (1994)	Peak position
UK Singles (OCC)	39
