= Craig Dean (footballer) =

English footballer

Personal information
- Place of birth: Nuneaton, England
- Positions: Defender; midfielder

Team information
- Current team: Leeds United (Head Of Youth Talent)

Youth career
- Years: Team
- Manchester United

Craig Dean is an English former footballer who played as a left back, he works as the Head Of Youth Talent for Premier League side Leeds United.

== Coaching career ==
He works for Leeds United as Head Of Youth Talent. He previously worked at Newcastle United as Head Of Player Development between 2007 and 2013, before joining Oxford United as a chief scout in 2015. He has also worked for the Football Associationas a Regional coach between 2013 and 2015
