= Sherri, Don't Fail Me Now! =

1994 single by Status Quo

Single by Status Quo

from the album Thirsty Work
- Released: 10 October 1994
- Length: 3:20; 2:51 (single version)
- Label: Polydor
- Songwriters: Bown; Edwards
- Producer: Francis Rossi

Status Quo singles chronology
"I Didn't Mean It" (1994)	"Sherri, Don't Fail Me Now!" (1994)	"Restless" (1994)

"Sherri, Don't Fail Me Now!" is a song by British rock band Status Quo, released as a single in October 1994 by Polydor Records. It was included on their 21st studio album, Thirsty Work (1994).

== Critical reception ==
Upon the release of the single, Alan Jones from Music Week wrote, "Another highly professional and typical Quo performance on a cheerful enough rocker. Certain to bring their fanbase out, but lacks the magic ingredient to attract others."

== Track listings ==
- Cassette and 7-inch red vinyl
1. "Sherri, Don't Fail Me Now!" (edit) (Bown, Edwards) (2.51)
2. "Beautiful" (Rossi, Bown) (3.40)
- CD1
1. "Sherri, Don't Fail Me Now!" (edit) (Bown, Edwards) (2.51)
2. "Beautiful" (Rossi, Bown) (3.40)
3. "In the Army Now" (live) (Bolland, Bolland) (4.27)
- CD2
1. "Sherri, Don't Fail Me Now!" (extended version) (Bown, Edwards) (3.45)
2. "Tossin' And Turnin'" (Rossi, Frost) (4.07)
3. "Down to You" (Rossi, Bown) (3.13)

== Charts ==
Chart (1994)	Peak position
UK Singles (OCC)	38
