= Leeds United (song) =

Single by Leeds United Football Team
- B-side: "Leeds! Leeds! Leeds!"
- Released: 1972
- Recorded: 1972
- Genre: Football music
- Label: Chapter 1

"Leeds United" was a single released by the English football team Leeds United in 1972, as the official song for their appearance in the Centenary FA Cup Final. It reached number 10 in the UK Singles Chart. Its B-side was the better known song "Leeds Leeds Leeds", also known as "Marching On Together".

"Leeds United" had new lyrics written by Les Reed, to the tune of "Sally Sunshine", a song originally written by Reed with Geoff Stephens. "Sally Sunshine" was originally recorded and released in 1971 by Miki Antony but fell short of reaching the UK Top 40, peaking at No 51. Cliff Richard recorded and released a German translation as "Wenn Du Lachst, Lacht das Gluck (Sally Sunshine)", in Germany in August 1971 (Columbia Germany, 1C 006-04 903) where it spent 1 week in the German charts. It was also recorded by the Mills Brothers for their 1972 What A Wonderful World album (Paramount, PAS 6024).

== Lyrics ==
The lyrics to "Leeds United" celebrate the entire Leeds United team of the time. Manager Don Revie and the twelve players who are almost universally considered to be the quintessential "Revie team" are all mentioned. All long-serving players who had their greatest years at the club, they were all together at the club between 1969 and 1974. There are twelve players, rather than the usual eleven, because Paul Madeley could, and would, replace any player, covering every position except goalkeeper over his 19-year, 700+ game career for the club.

== FA Cup Final line-up ==
The actual team for the FA Cup Final, which Leeds United won, did not include either Gary Sprake or Terry "Top Cat" Cooper. Sprake was replaced by David " The Viking " Harvey in the run-up to the Cup Final, while Cooper broke his leg and was replaced by Paul Madeley.
