= Beautiful Goal =

Single by Paul Oakenfold
- Released: 19 June 2006
- Recorded: EARS
- Genre: Electronica
- Length: 1:34
- Songwriter: Paul Oakenfold

"Beautiful Goal" is a short single by Paul Oakenfold, used in the FIFA video game series and encapsulating the passion and pride of the United Kingdom. Released as a separate soundtrack, subsequently it was licensed to Major League Soccer for use in television advertisements. 2007 became the third year in a row with "Beautiful Goal" being used for the FIFA series. It was completed with a backing riff by Andy Munroe, an amateur guitarist from South Accrington. Oakenfold's previous work includes the Big Brother UK theme tune.
