= 100. Yıl Albümü =

Studio album by Mustafa Sandal, Ufuk Yıldırım, Reha Falay and Murat Zor
- Released: May 2003
- Recorded: 2003
- Genre: Stadium anthem, Football chant
- Length: 52:32
- Language: Turkish
- Label: DMC Müzik

100. Yıl Albümü (a.k.a. BJK 100. Yıl Marşları) (English: Centennial Album) is a stadium anthems and football chants based album, recorded following the Turkish League triumph of Beşiktaş in 2003, their 100th year of foundation, prepared by Turkish musicians Mustafa Sandal and Ufuk Yıldırım, and composers Reha Falay and Murat Zor.

== Background and reception ==
Released in late May 2003, the album was initially promoted in Laila, a now-defunct dance music venue/nightclub, in front of around 2,000 attendees, along with club officials and footballers. The album consists of arrangements of fan chants and well-known local songs such as "Samanyolu", "İnleyen Nağmeler", and "Çilli Bom", as well as former world hit covers such as "Eye Of The Tiger" and "We Will Rock You".

The album has sold over 125,000 copies.

== Track list ==
Source: Idefix, TurkPop.com

No.	Title	Alternative English Title	Length
1.	"BJK 100. Yıl Marşı"	BJK Centennial March	5:13
2.	"BJK 100. Yıl Marşı"	BJK Centennial March	3:57
3.	"Şampiyon Kartal"	Eagle the Champion	3:55
4.	"Beşiktaş Sen Bizim Herşeyimizsin"	Beşiktaş, You're Our Everything	3:44
5.	"Bekleriz İnönü'ye"	See You in Inonu	2:40
6.	"Hadi Hisset"	Come On Feel It	2:29
7.	"Samanyolu"	Galaxy	3:51
8.	"Kartal Gol"	Eagle, Goal	2:43
9.	"Beşiktaş Marşı"	Beşiktaş March	3:27
10.	"Beşiktaş Sevgisi Ruhumu Sardı"	Love of Beşiktaş Surrounded My Soul	3:07
11.	"BJK 1903 Marşı"	BJK 1903 the March	3:42
12.	"Şampiyonlar Sayfası"	Champions Page	3:09
13.	"Canımız Feda"	Supreme Sacrifice	3:47
14.	"Kartal Marşı"	Eagle March	3:04
15.	"BJK 100. Yıl Marşı (Remix)"	BJK 1903 the March (Remix)	4:10
16.	"Gol Sonrası"	After Goal	0:59
17.	"Gol Sonrası - 2"	After Goal - 2	0:27
18.	"Gol Sonrası - 3"	After Goal - 3	1:28
