= Wij zijn Ajax =

Single by Ajax and Friends
- Released: 18 December 2012
- Genre: Pop
- Length: 3:13
- Label: SPEC Entertainment

"Wij zijn Ajax" (Dutch, "We are Ajax") is a song by Ajax and Friends. A one-off single by Dutch association football club AFC Ajax, which features guest vocal by several of the club's first team and women's team players, as well as prominent vocalists from the Netherlands, such as Victor Reinier, Koos Alberts, Dré Hazes, Karin Bloemen, Robert ten Brink, Peter Beense and Glennis Grace. The song also features rap parts from Darryl, RB Djan and Ryan Babel. The single was released online as a digital download on SPEC Entertainment, the label owned by popular Dutch rapper Ali B., while the video clip was frequently aired on television at the time of the release.

== Listings ==
The single was on the European Single Top 100 for five weeks peaking at #46. It spent 5 weeks in the Netherlands Top 40 as well peaking at #2.
