= Diamond Lights =

Single by Glenn & Chris
- Released: April 1987
- Recorded: 1987
- Genre: Synth-pop
- Label: Record Shack Records
- Songwriter: Bob Puzey
- Producers: Bob Puzey, Terry Hobart

"Diamond Lights" is a 1987 single by the English footballers Glenn Hoddle and Chris Waddle, released under their first names, "Glenn & Chris". The song, by the then-Tottenham Hotspur and England teammates, reached number 12 in the UK Singles Chart in May 1987 and was by far the more successful of two chart releases for the duo. Despite its success, public opinion of the record's quality has been decidedly negative, with the pair's television performance of the song being widely ridiculed.

== Background ==
Chris Waddle recalls the single coming about following an appearance two of them made for their personal sponsors, Budget Rent a Car, at an annual company awards ceremony. Hoddle and Waddle attempted an impromptu karaoke performance which was praised by a friend with connections in the music industry who was able to introduce the duo to Bob Puzey. Puzey, whose writing credits included "I'm In the Mood for Dancing" by the Nolan Sisters and "Wanted" by the Dooleys, auditioned the pair and agreed to write and co-produce a single for them. The "diamond lights" of the title refer to the songwriter's wife's eyes.

== Release ==
Written by Bob Puzey and co-produced by Puzey and Terry Hobart, "Diamond Lights" debuted in the UK Singles Chart at number 30 on 18 April 1987. It spent 8 weeks in the chart, climbing to a peak position of 12 on 2 May.

== Television performance ==
The duo's live performance of the song on the widely watched music programme Top of the Pops is often referred to as one of popular music's most embarrassing moments. One journalist described it as "... truly awful dad dancing and shocking lyrics" while another opined, "A timeless classic for all the wrong reasons ... You get the feeling that Waddle was rightly embarrassed to be there while Hoddle genuinely felt he was at the start of something big." Waddle later remembered the Top of the Pops performance as "the most nerve-racking thing [he'd] ever done" and stated that the duo had to appear on the programme in person as the producers had refused to air the accompanying music video because "[it] was so bad." In contrast, Hoddle recalled the appearance in a positive light, referred to it as "one of the greatest things I ever did ... I'm glad I did it and I learnt a lot from it."

== Follow-up single and legacy ==
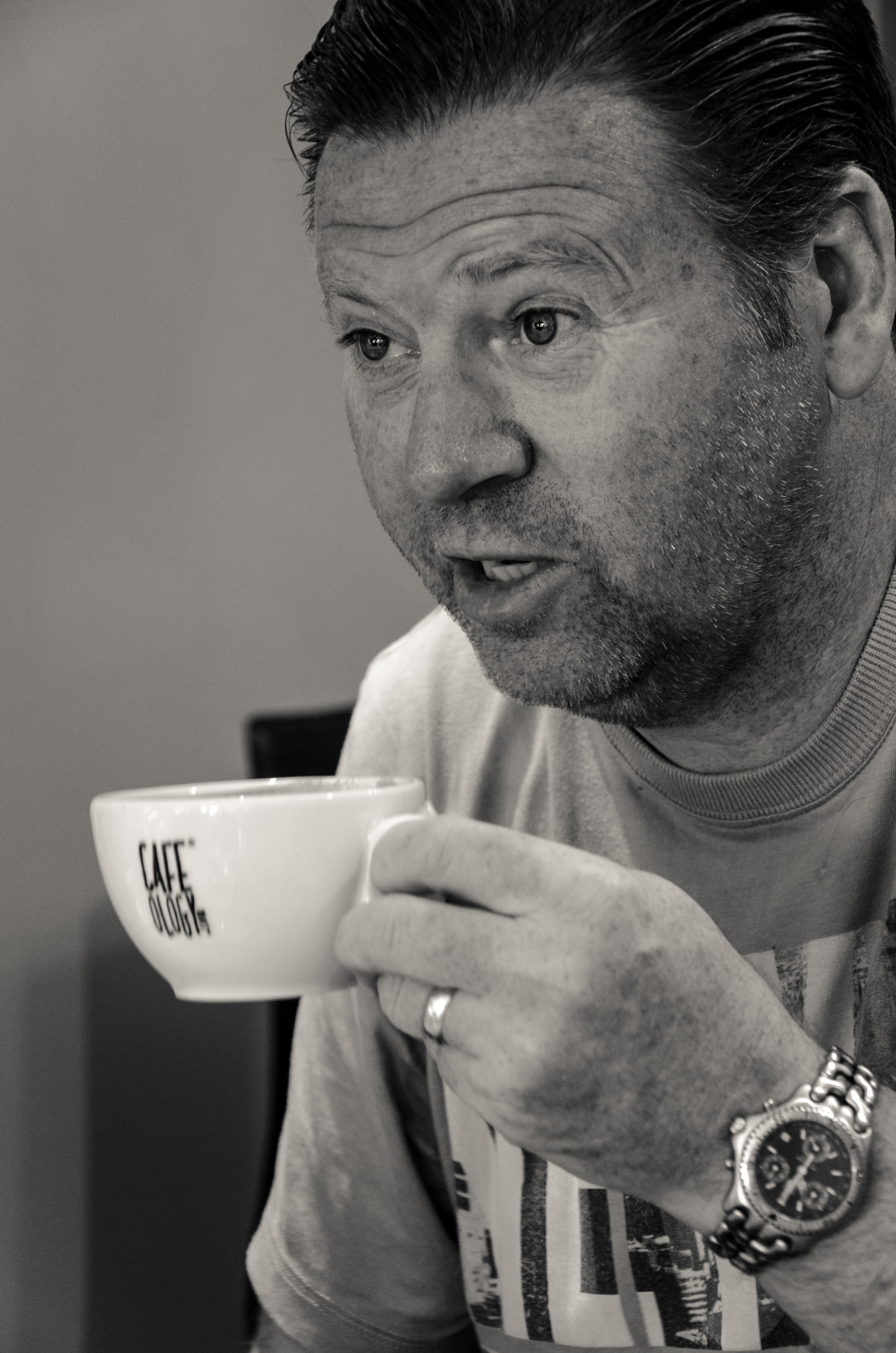
Waddle in 2012

Glenn & Chris recorded and shot the music video for a follow-up single entitled "It's Goodbye" but promotion for the release was hampered by Hoddle's transfer to AS Monaco and the song subsequently only reached 92 in the British chart. Waddle later recorded a song titled "We've Got A Feeling" with Olympique de Marseille teammate Basile Boli which he said topped the Albanian music charts. The success of "Diamond Lights" inspired another Tottenham and England midfielder, Paul Gascoigne, to release his own single, "Fog on the Tyne (Revisited)" in 1990.

"Diamond Lights" is still remembered with amusement for its perceived kitsch, and has featured prominently in popular polls to discover the worst pop song ever. Football writer Luke Ginnell described it as "an angsty synth-pop cringefest of a tune" and "a heinous and unforgivable crime against the ear". When interviewing Hoddle for the position of manager of the England national team, FA chief executive Graham Kelly reportedly asked him, "Any skeletons in the closet?" before quipping, "apart from that record with Chris Waddle?"

== Track listing ==
=== 7": Record Shack Records / KICK 1 (UK) ===
1. "Diamond Lights"
2. "Diamond Lights" (instrumental)

== Charts ==
=== Weekly charts ===
Chart (1987)	Peak position
UK Singles (Official Charts Company)	12
