= Zahra Universe =

American singer

Sarah Ragsdale, formerly known professionally as Zahra Universe, is an American pop singer. Notable single releases include "Drop" (2008), "Lock Me Up" (2009), "Falling in Love" (2011), "Gimme a Sign" (2012), "Dancin by the Fire" featuring Soprano (2012), and "Sela Sela (Dance Together)" with Wes Madiko and produced by Will.i.Am Productions, which was named Official Song of the Africa Football Cup of Nations, South Africa 2013 (2013 Africa Cup of Nations), all released by Arusa Entertainment.

In addition to musical theatre, Zahra Universe has made several TV acting appearances including programs on the History Channel and Investigation Discovery. She has founded the non-profit organization Cultural Universe Exchange which is geared toward encouraging cultural dialogue and helping schools and youth in need of supplies, especially those toward improving education. In 2011, Zahra Universe was honored with the title of "Ambassador of Goodwill" for the growing seaport city of Kribi, Cameroon.
