= Arsenal Number One =

2000 single by the English football team Arsenal

"Arsenal Number One / Our Goal"

Single by Arsenal FC
- Released: June 3, 2000
- Genre: Pop
- Length: 3:17
- Label: The Grapevine Label
- Composer(s): Bega, Prado, Zippy
- Lyricist(s): David Dein, Geoff Morrow
- Producer(s): Geoff Morrow, Paul Brooks

Arsenal FC singles chronology
"Hot Stuff" (1998)	"Arsenal Number One / Our Goal" (2000)

"Arsenal Number One" was a single released by the English football team Arsenal, as a double A-side with "Our Goal", in 2000. It reached number 46 in the UK Singles Chart.

"Arsenal Number One" was adapted from Lou Bega's "Mambo No. 5." Additional lyrics were written by David Dein and Geoff Morrow. Like other Arsenal singles, the lyrics include quippy lines about Arsenal's first-team squad.

"Our Goal" featured Finbar Wright and Ian Wright (no relation), the latter of whom narrates a history of Arsenal in the middle of the song.
