= Shouting for the Gunners =

Single by Arsenal F.C.
- Released: 3 May 1993
- Genre: Football chant

Arsenal F.C. singles chronology
| "Good Old Arsenal" (1971) | "Shouting for the Gunners" (1993) | "Hot Stuff" (1998) |

"Shouting for the Gunners" was a single released by the English football team Arsenal, with Tippa Irie and Peter Hunnigale on 3 May 1993. It reached number 34 in the UK Singles Chart.
