= Lift it High (All About Belief) =

"Lift It High (All About Belief)"

Single by The 1999 Manchester United Squad
- Released: 17 May 1999
- Recorded: 1999
- Genre: Pop, Football, Electronic
- Length: 4:05
- Label: MCI
- Songwriter: Ade Orange
- Producers: Andy Pickles; Karl Maddison

The 1999 Manchester United Squad singles chronology
"Move Move Move (The Red Tribe)" (1996)	"Lift It High (All About Belief)" (1999)

"Lift it High (All About Belief)" is a song recorded in 1999 by the Treble-winning Manchester United F.C. team of 1998–99. It is also the final single released by the club. Released on 17 May 1999, the single spent a total of seven weeks in the UK Singles Chart, reaching a peak position of number 11.

== Reception ==
Music magazine NME described the song as "heartfelt, soaring and beautiful", and compared it to the music of Embrace. Writing for Bleacher Report, Paul Ansorge described it as an Oasis rip-off with impactful lyrics, and praised the accompanying music video as "magical". Tom Victor described it as a song that would fit in on a Shine compilation. United fansite Full Time Devils ranked it as the 5th greatest United song.

== Track listing ==
1. "Lift it High (All About Belief)"
2. "Lift it High (All About Belief)" (Instrumental)
3. "Lift it High (All About Belief)" (Red Hot Dance Mix)

== Charts ==
Chart (1999)	Peak position
UK Singles Chart	11
