= The Boys in the Old Brighton Blue =

"The Boys in the Old Brighton Blue" was a single released by the English football team Brighton & Hove Albion to commemorate reaching the 1983 FA Cup Final. It reached number 65 in the UK Singles Chart.
