= Move Move Move (The Red Tribe) =

Single by Manchester United F.C.
- Released: 22 April 1996
- Genre: Electronic, Disco
- Length: 3:44
- Label: MCI
- Songwriter(s): Mark Topham; Karl Twigg
- Producer(s): TTW

Manchester United F.C. singles chronology
"We're Gonna Do It Again" (1995)	"Move Move Move (The Red Tribe)" (1996)	"Lift It High (All About Belief)" (1999)

"Move Move Move (The Red Tribe)" is a single released by Manchester United F.C. on 22 April 1996. Written by Mark Topham and Karl Twigg, the single features the squad that reached the 1996 FA Cup Final. It peaked at number six on the UK Singles Chart and re-entered the chart at number 50 three months later.

== Charts ==
=== Weekly charts ===
Chart (1996)	Peak position
UK Singles (OCC)	6
UK Indie (Music Week)	1

=== Year-end charts ===
Chart (1996)	Position
UK Singles (OCC)	58
