= Come On You Reds =

Single by the Manchester United football squad featuring Status Quo
- Released: 18 April 1994
- Length: 3:25
- Label: PolyGram TV
- Songwriter(s): Francis Rossi; Andy Bown; John Edwards
- Producer(s): Status Quo

Status Quo singles chronology
"Rock 'til You Drop" (1992)	"Come On You Reds" (1994)	"I Didn't Mean It" (1994)

Manchester United singles chronology
"United (We Love You)" (1993)	"Come On You Reds" (1994)	"We're Gonna Do It Again" (1995)

"Come on You Reds" is a song recorded by the 1994 Manchester United football squad, written and produced by the rock group Status Quo. It first entered the UK Singles Chart on 30 April 1994 and remained there for a total of 15 weeks, reaching a two-week peak of number one. The song is the only (as of 2024) club side football single to reach number one on the UK chart; however, "Back Home" (in 1970) and "World in Motion" (in 1990) both topped the charts for the England national side. The song also reached number one in Denmark and became a top-10 hit in Ireland and Norway.

== History ==
With Status Quo involved in the recording of the track, it was decided that the band's 1988 single "Burning Bridges" would form the basis of the song, with altered lyrics to suit the Manchester United theme. The single was released on 18 April 1994, four weeks before the 1994 FA Cup Final. By the weekend of the game, the song had reached number one, where it remained for two weeks. It then dropped down the chart, remaining there for a total of 15 weeks. Opponents Chelsea also released a team song, "No One Can Stop Us Now", which reached number 23.

== Charts ==
=== Weekly charts ===
Chart (1994)	Peak position
Denmark (IFPI)	1
Europe (Eurochart Hot 100)	7
Ireland (IRMA)	2
Norway (VG-lista)	7
Scotland (OCC)	4
UK Singles (OCC)	1

=== Year-end charts ===
Chart (1994)	Position
Europe (Eurochart Hot 100)	71
UK Singles (OCC)	12

== Certifications ==
Region	Certification	Certified units/sales
United Kingdom (BPI)	Silver	200,000^{^}
^{^} Shipments figures based on certification alone.
