= Sitting on Top of the World (Liverpool F.C. song) =

Single by Liverpool F.C.
- Released: 28 April 1986

Liverpool F.C. singles chronology
"Liverpool (We're Never Gonna...)" (1983)	"Sitting on Top of the World" (1986)	"Anfield Rap (Red Machine in Full Effect)" (1988)

"Sitting on Top of the World" was a single released by the English football team Liverpool on 28 April 1986. It reached number 50 in the UK Singles Chart.
