= No One Can Stop Us Now =

1994 single by Chelsea football club

"No One Can Stop Us Now" was a single released by the English football team Chelsea in 1994, for reaching the 1994 FA Cup Final. It reached number 23 in the UK Singles Chart.

Opponents Manchester United also released a song, Come On You Reds, which reached number 1.
