= United (We Love You) =

Single by Manchester United
- Released: 1993
- Genre: Pop
- Label: Living Beat
- Songwriter(s): Brian Hodgson; Charles Bailey
- Producer(s): Brian Hodgson; Charles Bailey

Manchester United singles chronology
"We All Follow Man United" (1985)	"United (We Love You)" (1993)	"Come On You Reds" (1994)

"United (We Love You)" was a single released by the English football team Manchester United in 1993. It reached number 37 in the UK Singles Chart.
