= Manchester United (song) =

Single by Manchester United Football Club
- Released: 1976
- Genre: Pop
- Label: Decca
- Songwriter(s): Keith Hiller; Tony Hiller
- Producer(s): Tony Hiller

Manchester United Football Club singles chronology
"Manchester United Calypso" (1957)	"Manchester United" (1976)	"Glory Glory Man United" (1983)

"Manchester United" was a single released by the English football team Manchester United in 1976. It reached number 50 in the UK Singles Chart.
