= We All Follow Man United =

Single by Manchester United
- Released: 1985
- Genre: Pop
- Label: Columbia
- Songwriter(s): Katrina Wallis; Dave Melia; Mike Timoney
- Producer(s): Peter Tattersall; Richard Scott

Manchester United singles chronology
"Glory Glory Man United" (1983)	"We All Follow Man United" (1985)	"United (We Love You)" (1993)

"We All Follow Man United" was a single released by the English football team Manchester United in 1985. It reached number 10 in the UK Singles Chart.
