= Glasgow Rangers (Nine in a Row) =

1997 single by Rangers F.C.

"Glasgow Rangers (Nine in a Row)" was a single released by the Scottish football team Rangers in 1997 to celebrate their achievement of winning nine consecutive national league titles. It reached number 54 in the UK Singles Chart.
