= Liverpool (We're Never Gonna...) =

Single by Liverpool F.C.
- Released: 1983
- Composer: Stan Alexander/Terry Sylvester

Liverpool F.C. singles chronology
"We Can Do It" (1977)	"Liverpool (We're Never Gonna...)" (1983)	"Sitting on Top of the World" (1986)

"Liverpool (We're Never Gonna...)" was a single released by the English football team Liverpool in 1983, as a double A-side with "Liverpool Anthem". It reached number 54 in the UK Singles Chart.
