= Marching On Together =

"Leeds, Leeds, Leeds (Marching on Together)"

Single by Leeds United FC
- A-side: "Leeds United"
- Released: 1972; 1992 (12" remix); 16 May 2010 (re-released)
- Recorded: 1972
- Genre: Pop
- Length: 2:22
- Label: Chapter 1 (original release), Rebecca Music
- Songwriters: Les Reed, Barry Mason

"Leeds! Leeds! Leeds!" (commonly known as "Marching On Together") is the name of the anthem of Leeds United written by Les Reed and Barry Mason. The vocals on the original 1972 recording were sung by members of the Leeds United team and their supporters. The record stayed in the UK Singles Chart for almost three months, peaking at number 10.

The song is played just before kick-off at every home game at Elland Road and it is a ritual for every Leeds United fan to stand up and sing when it is played.

The song has also been used by supporters of other Leeds-based sports teams, such as the Leeds Rhinos rugby league team.

== Background ==
The song was released in 1972 as the B-side of the record released by Leeds United to coincide with the team reaching the 1972 FA Cup Final, the A-side being titled "Leeds United". Unlike many football songs that are just new words set to existing music, "Leeds! Leeds! Leeds!" is an original composition by Les Reed and Barry Mason. The song has since become a club anthem regularly sung by the fans.

In the modern age, it has become a regular way for Leeds United fans to demonstrate their allegiance to finish text messages, emails, or Twitter messages with the acronym/hashtag MOT.

An official club magazine, Leeds, Leeds, Leeds, which was published from 1998 to 2011, was named after the original title of the song.

After Leeds' promotion back to the Championship in May 2010, in an effort to get the song into the UK Singles Chart, it was digitally re-mastered and re-released via a social networking group, after an idea by Dave Whittaker, from Roundhay in Leeds, who also designed the sleeve for the CD Marching on Together, Leeds United Greatest Hits. The song charted at number 10 on 23 May 2010. The next week it dropped to number 112.

Supporters of other Leeds-based sports teams, such as the Leeds Rhinos rugby league team, also sing the song. The only part of the song that is removed in these alternative versions is the first four lines, which contain 'Leeds United' twice, as 'United' obviously does not apply to these teams. Leeds' ultimate frisbee team, LeedsLeedsLeeds, were also named after the song and club magazine.

== Fans' variations ==
Parts of the current version of the song have varied in form from the original one. The fans usually add the "na na na na na na" and mimic the song where there are no words, though some fans have replaced this part controversially by clapping. Another way the fans have changed the song is by commonly repeating the "ups and downs" part following it being sung. In addition, some fans have added in the repetition of 'altogether' after it is sung in the main song as well.

"Glory Glory Leeds United" (to the tune of "Glory Glory Hallelujah") is a completely different song from "Leeds United" which like "Leeds Leeds Leeds" is an original composition by Reed/Mason. Both tracks are available on the CD Marching On Together, Leeds United Greatest Hits.

In 2012, fans of the Minnesota Twins adapted the lyric (replacing 'Leeds United' with 'Minnesota', and 'Leeds! Leeds! Leeds!' with 'Twins! Twins! Twins!') to support the Major League Baseball team.

== Chart performance ==
"Leeds, Leeds, Leeds (Marching on Together)" entered the Irish Singles Chart on 20 May 2010 at number 41 and charted in the UK Singles Chart on 23 May 2010 at number 10.

Chart (2010)	Peak position
Ireland (IRMA)	41
UK Singles (Official Charts)	10
UK Independent (Official Charts)	1
