= We're Gonna Do It Again =

Single by Manchester United football squad featuring Stryker
- Released: 1 May 1995
- Genre: Dance-pop, rock
- Length: 4:08
- Songwriter(s): Andy Bown; John Edwards; Rick Parfitt; Jackie Lynton
- Producer(s): Andy Bown; John Edwards

Manchester United football squad featuring Stryker singles chronology
"Come On You Reds" (1994)	"We're Gonna Do It Again" (1995)	"Move Move Move (The Red Tribe)" (1996)

"We're Gonna Do It Again" was a single released on 1 May 1995 by the English football team Manchester United for the 1995 FA Cup Final. It entered the UK Singles Chart at number 15 and peaked at number 6 on 14 May.
