= Yeovil True =

Single by Yeovil Town
- Released: February 17, 2004

"Yeovil True" was a single released by the English football team Yeovil Town in 2004. It reached number 36 in the UK Singles Chart.

The song was released to celebrate the side's FA Cup tie against Liverpool, which was won by Liverpool. It was available only in Yeovil, with over 3,000 copies sold in three days. It was loosely based on "Two Little Boys", a song first recorded in the American Civil War and later performed by Rolf Harris.
