= We Can Do It (Liverpool F.C. song) =

Single by Liverpool F.C.
- Released: 1977

Liverpool F.C. singles chronology
"We Can Do It" (1977)	"Liverpool (We're Never Gonna...)" (1983)

"We Can Do It" was a single released by the English football team Liverpool in 1977, sung to the same tune as The Rubettes' 1975 hit "I Can Do It". It reached number 15 in the UK Singles Chart.
