= Good Old Arsenal =

Single by Arsenal F.C.
- Released: 1971
- Genre: Football song
- Songwriter: Jimmy Hill

Arsenal F.C. singles chronology
"Good Old Arsenal" (1971)	"Shouting for the Gunners" (1993)

"Good Old Arsenal" was a single released by the English football team Arsenal in 1971. It reached number 16 in the UK Singles Chart.

== History ==
In the 1960s and 1970s, several football clubs released records. After being inspired by "Back Home" by the England national football team in 1970, Arsenal players were urged by football pundit Jimmy Hill to create an anthem for Arsenal that could rival Liverpool's "You'll Never Walk Alone". ITV held a competition for fans to create an Arsenal anthem. However, none of the entrants were selected as the stronger candidates were seen as "too wordy". Hill then approached Arsenal's manager Bertie Mee for permission to write his own anthem for Arsenal. Hill wrote "Good Old Arsenal" to the tune of "Rule, Britannia!" and it was performed by Arsenal's first team squad for their 1971 FA Cup Final song. This was the first record ever released to be performed by a football team's squad to commemorate them reaching the FA Cup Final.

"Good Old Arsenal" was initially disliked by some Arsenal fans who felt that it was bland and predictable. However, it did at first gain popularity with younger Arsenal fans because they found it was easy to learn. Following Arsenal's win in the final, the second part of their first double, "Good Old Arsenal" became widely accepted and popular at Arsenal and continued to be sung by Arsenal supporters and is viewed as a classic football song.

== Charts ==
"Good Old Arsenal" was first released into the UK Singles Charts in May 1971 and remained in the charts for seven weeks. Its highest position was 16.
