= Leeds United F.C. =

Association football club in England

Leeds United
- Full name: Leeds United Football Club
- Nickname: The Whites
- Founded: 17 October 1919; 107 years ago
- Ground: Elland Road
- Capacity: 37,633
- Owner: 49ers Enterprises
- Chairman: Paraag Marathe
- Manager: Daniel Farke
- League: Premier League
- 2025–26: Premier League, 14th of 20
- Website: leedsunited.com
Home colours	Away colours	Third colours

Leeds United Football Club is a professional football club based in Leeds, West Yorkshire, England. The club competes in the Premier League, the top tier of English football.

Leeds United have won three top-flight league titles, one FA Cup, one League Cup, two Charity Shields and two Inter-Cities Fairs Cups. The club had their most successful period under the management of Don Revie in the 1960s and 1970s. The club have also been runners-up five times in the top flight, three times in the FA Cup, once each in the League Cup, the Charity Shield, the Inter-Cities Fairs Cup, the Cup Winners' Cup and the European Cup.

Leeds United share rivalries with Manchester United and Chelsea. The team's traditional kit colours are white shirts, white shorts and white socks. Their badge features the White Rose of York, which is a symbol of Yorkshire.

== History ==
=== Pre-Leeds United ===
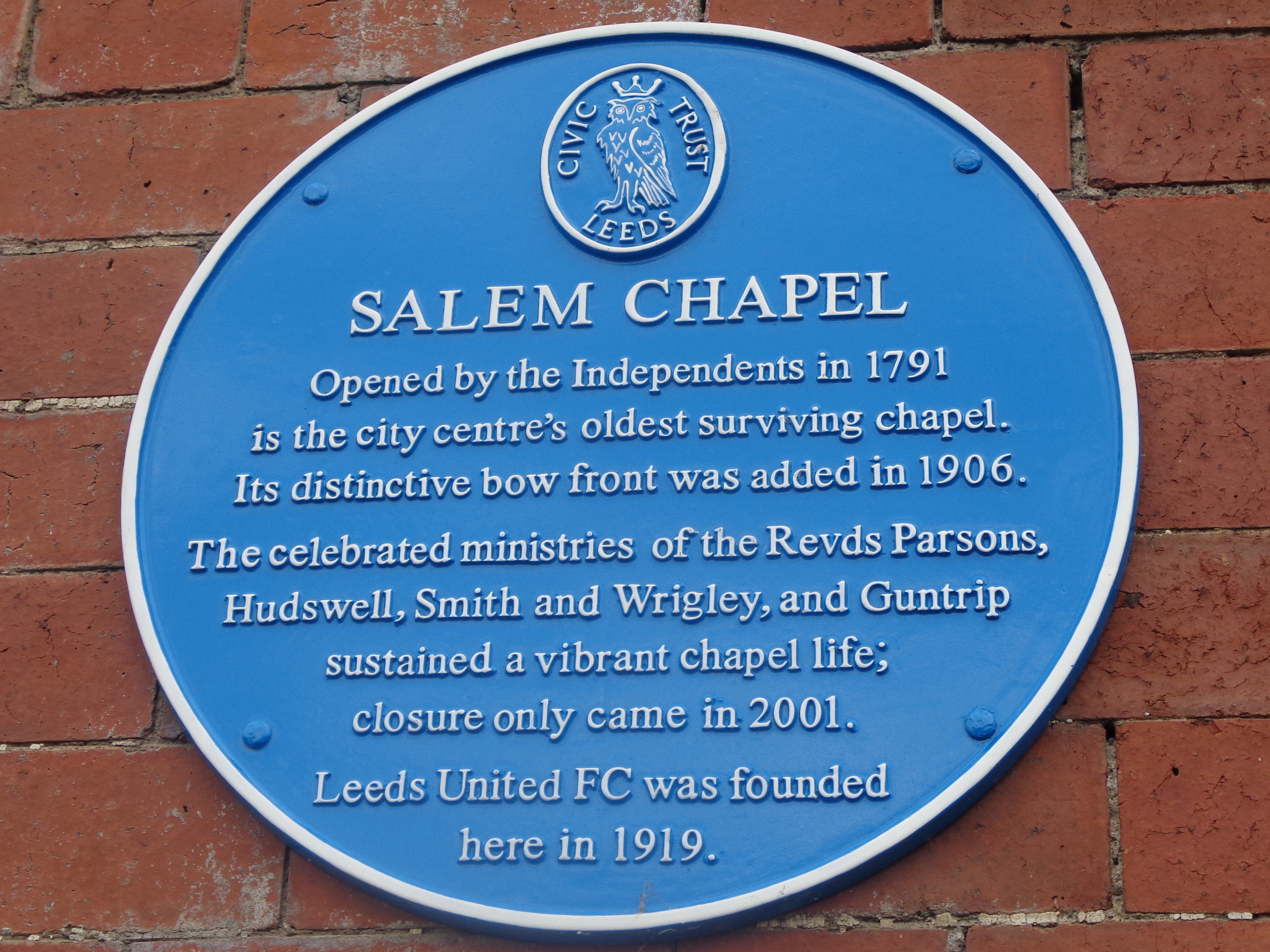
Blue plaque commemorating the foundation of Leeds United in 1919

Leeds United's predecessor Leeds City was formed in 1904 and elected to league membership in 1905. Leeds City were forcibly disbanded by the Football League in 1919, in response to allegations of illegal payments made to players during the First World War. Leeds City's assets were sold off on 17 October, the same day supporters gathered and voted unanimously to form Leeds United, they received an invitation to enter the Midland League, being voted into it on 31 October, taking the place vacated by Leeds City Reserves. Following Leeds City's disbanding, Yorkshire Amateurs bought their Elland Road stadium and then sold it to Leeds United for £250.

Huddersfield Town chairman Hilton Crowther loaned Leeds United £35,000 to be repaid when Leeds United won promotion to the First Division. He brought in former Barnsley manager Arthur Fairclough taking charge on 26 February 1920, replacing Dick Ray.

=== 1920–1960: Beginnings ===
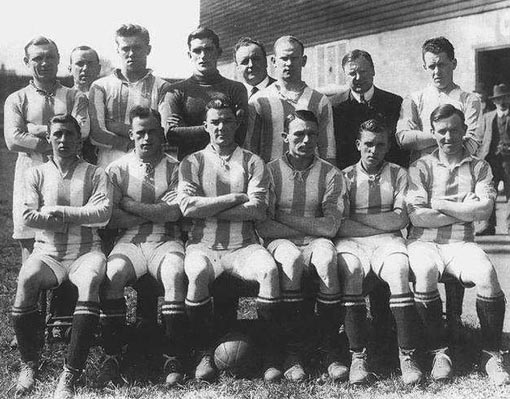
The first Leeds United team at the start of the 1920–21 season

On 31 May 1920, Leeds United were elected to the Football League. Leeds consolidated their position in the Second Division and in 1923–24 won the title and with it promotion to the First Division. Leeds failed to establish themselves and were relegated in 1926–27. After their relegation, Fairclough resigned, which paved the way for Dick Ray to return as manager. In the years up until the start of World War II, Leeds were twice relegated; on both occasions, they were re-promoted the following season.

On 5 March 1935, Dick Ray resigned after 8 years being manager, and was replaced by Billy Hampson, who remained in charge for 12 years. In 1946–47 after the war, Leeds United were relegated again, with the worst league record in their history. After this season, Hampson resigned (he stayed as their chief scout for eight months) and was replaced in April 1947 by Willis Edwards. In 1948, Sam Bolton replaced Ernest Pullan as the chairman of Leeds United. Edwards was moved to assistant manager in April 1948 after just one year as manager. He was replaced by Frank Buckley.

Leeds United remained in the Second Division until 1955–56, when they once again won promotion to the First Division, inspired by John Charles. Charles was hungry for success at the highest level, and manager Raich Carter was unable to convince him that Leeds could satisfy his ambitions. Charles was sold to Juventus for a then world record fee of £65,000. On 30 November 1957, Gerry Francis became the club's first black player. Leeds United were then relegated to the Second Division in 1959–60.

=== 1961–1974: Don Revie era ===
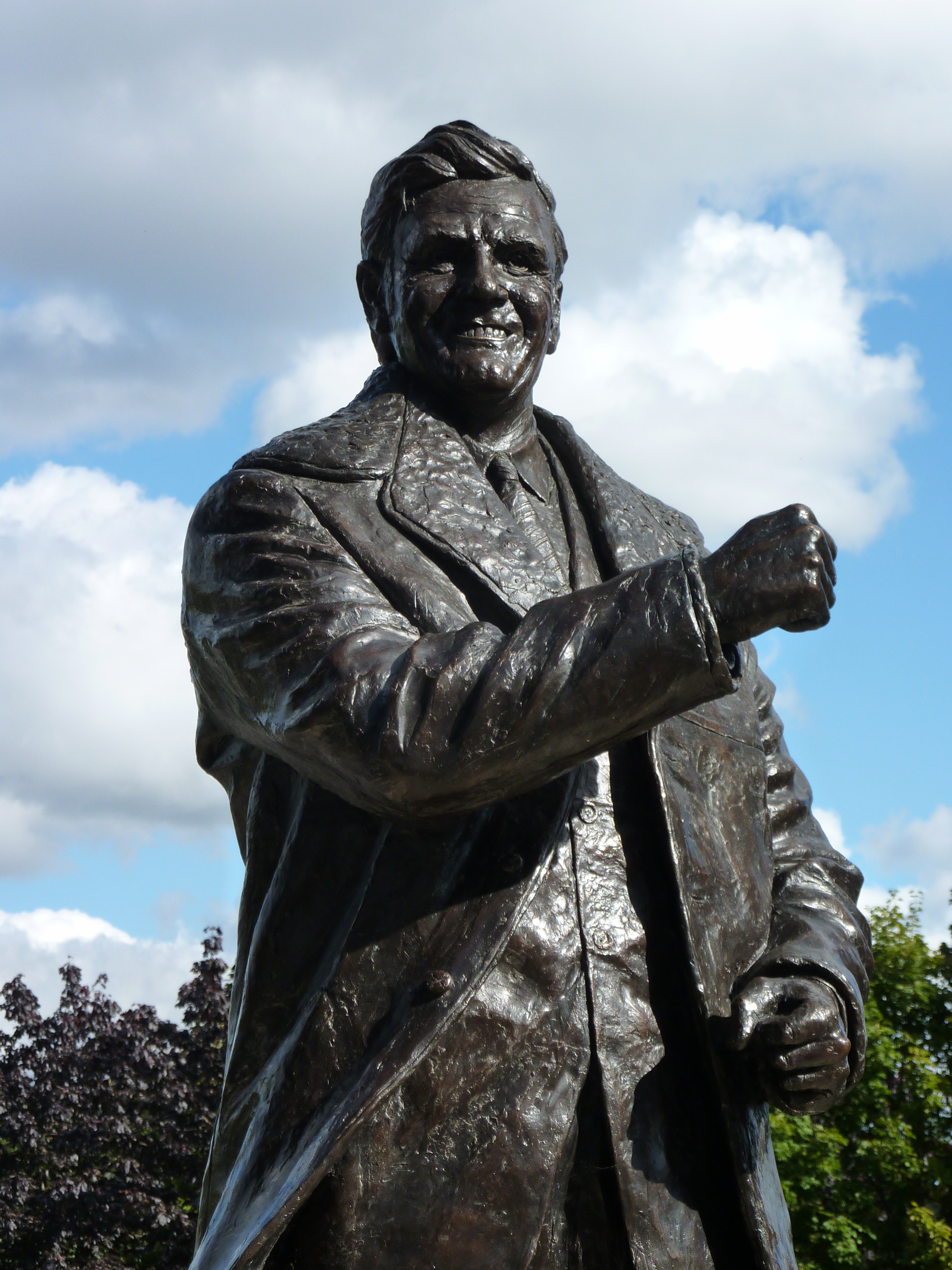
Don Revie statue outside Elland Road

On 17 March 1961, Don Revie was appointed as manager following the resignation of Jack Taylor. His stewardship began in adverse circumstances; the club was "in financial difficulty" and in 1961–62 only a win in the final game of the season saved the club from relegation to the Third Division. Revie implemented a youth policy and a change of kit colour to an all-white strip in the style of Real Madrid, and Leeds United won promotion to the First Division in 1963–64. Leeds United finished second in the league on goal average in 1964–65, and also reached the final of the FA Cup, losing to Liverpool at Wembley after extra-time. Leeds United again finished second in the league in 1965–66, whilst also reaching the semi-finals of the Inter-Cities Fairs Cup, losing on aggregate to Spanish side Real Zaragoza. Leeds United finished fourth in the league in 1966–67, as well as reaching the semi-finals of the FA Cup, losing to Chelsea and the final of the Inter-Cities Fairs Cup, losing to Croatian side Dinamo Zagreb.

Leeds United nearly doubled their record transfer in 1967–68, buying Sheffield United centre-forward Mick Jones for £100,000. Leeds won their first major trophy, the League Cup, beating Arsenal in a tense final at Wembley. Leeds finished fourth in the league and were beaten in the FA Cup semi-finals by Everton. They also reached a second successive Inter-Cities Fairs Cup final and this time won the trophy, beating Hungarian side Ferencváros over two legs; Leeds won the first leg 1–0, and a month later defended their lead with a 0–0 draw in Budapest. Leeds won their first league title the following season, after a draw with challengers Liverpool at Anfield, whose supporters congratulated Leeds. Leeds set a number of records including most points (67), most wins (27), fewest defeats (2), and most home points (39); a still-unbroken club record is their 34 match unbeaten run that extended into the following season.

Leeds United broke the British transfer record in 1969–70, by signing Leicester City centre-forward Allan Clarke for £165,000. Leeds targeted the treble and came close to achieving it, only to fail on all three fronts in a congested close season, finishing second in the league to Everton, losing the FA Cup final to Chelsea (after a replay), and exiting the European Cup with a semi-final defeat to Celtic. Leeds and Arsenal both challenged for the league title the following season, though it would be Arsenal who would claim it, finishing one point ahead after the former lost to West Bromwich Albion following a controversial "offside" goal. Leeds were also knocked out of the FA Cup by Fourth Division side Colchester United, but did again find success in the Inter-Cities Fairs Cup, beating Juventus in the final over two legs.

Leeds United mounted a challenge for the double in 1971–72, and came close to achieving it, but once again heavy fixture congestion meant that Leeds had to play three crucial games within the space of one week; an away match against Chelsea in the league three days before the FA Cup final and then they had to play their final league game less than two days after the final, which was away to Wolverhampton Wanderers. Leeds only had to draw the game to win the title, but were beaten. Leeds did however win the FA Cup for the first time, beating Arsenal in the final. Leeds finished third in the league the following season, never sustaining a convincing title challenge and lost the FA Cup final to Second Division Sunderland against all expectations. They also reached the European Cup Winners' Cup final against AC Milan, where they were beaten following some controversial refereeing decisions by Christos Michas who was later banned by UEFA for 'fixing' other matches; however despite appeals from Leeds no replay was awarded by UEFA and AC Milan were never penalised. Leeds won the league title for the second time the following season, finishing five-points ahead of second-placed Liverpool. Don Revie left at the end of the season to become England manager.

Don Revie guided Leeds United to two Football League First Division titles, one FA Cup, one League Cup, two Inter-Cities Fairs Cups, one Football League Second Division title and one Charity Shield. He also guided them to three more FA Cup finals, two more FA Cup semi-finals, one more Inter-Cities Fairs Cup final and one Inter-Cities Fairs Cup semi-final, one European Cup Winners' Cup final and one European Cup semi-final. Leeds also finished second in the Football League First Division five times, third once and fourth twice. In a survey of leading football writers, historians and academics by Total Sport magazine, Revie's Leeds were voted as one of the 50 greatest football teams of all time.

=== 1974–1988: Post-Revie and relegation ===
Don Revie had recommended Johnny Giles as his replacement; however, the Leeds board instead appointed one of England's most successful and outspoken managers, Brian Clough. Clough arrived without his key assistant Peter Taylor, who was supposed to be part of the deal agreed by Leeds, but instead decided to remain at Brighton. Clough was an outspoken critic of Revie and his team; in addition, his management style was in complete contrast to Revie's close relationship with his players and his methodical attention to detail. Clough's tenure as manager started badly, with defeat in the Charity Shield against Liverpool in which Billy Bremner and Kevin Keegan were sent off for fighting. Leeds performed poorly under Clough, and after only 44 days he was dismissed. Clough was replaced by former England captain Jimmy Armfield.

Assisted by Don Howe, Armfield was responsible for rebuilding Don Revie's ageing side, a task which he achieved with some success, guiding the team to the final of the European Cup, in which they were defeated by Bayern Munich under controversial circumstances. Armfield continued to rebuild Revie's team, and though it no longer dominated English football, it remained in the top ten for subsequent seasons. Leeds' board was impatient for greater success and dismissed Armfield, replacing him with Jock Stein, who also lasted just 44 days before leaving to manage Scotland. Jimmy Adamson was appointed as his replacement.

Adamson took Leeds back into Europe and reached a League Cup semi-final in his first season in charge. Poor sales in the transfer market caused a rapid decline in Leeds' fortunes, with the team winning just four of their first seventeen league games, Adamson resigned and was replaced by Allan Clarke. Clarke shored up the defence, ensuring that Leeds survived in his first season in charge. Leeds were beaten by Swansea City in the first game of the following season, and the team never seemed to recover. The previously watertight defence started to ship goals, and the team seemed unable to score. Clarke broke the club's transfer record when he purchased Peter Barnes, but his impact was slight – the team scored just five goals in fourteen league games. Clarke was unable to stem the tide, and the club was relegated. Clarke was dismissed and replaced by former teammate Eddie Gray.

Impatient for success again the board dismissed Gray in October 1985, replacing him with former teammate Billy Bremner. In 1986–87, Leeds reached the play-off final, but were defeated by Charlton Athletic. Leeds also endured a near miss in the FA Cup, losing out to Coventry City in the semi-finals.

=== 1988–2002: Wilkinson, Graham and O'Leary ===
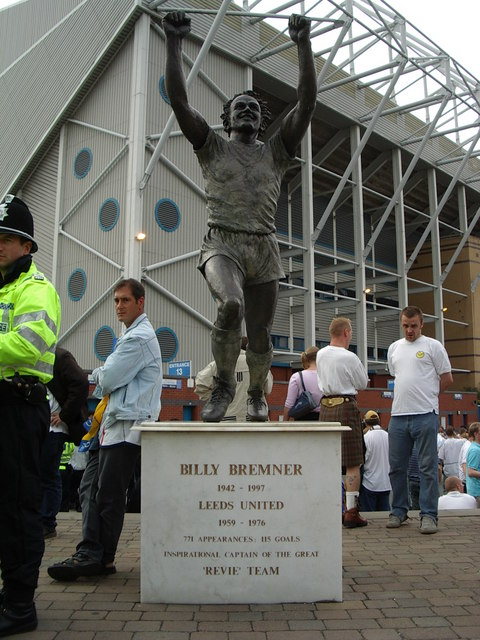
Billy Bremner statue outside Elland Road

In October 1988, with Leeds United 21st in the Second Division, Bremner was dismissed to make way for Howard Wilkinson. Leeds avoided relegation that season, and in March 1989 signed Gordon Strachan from Manchester United for £300,000. The Scottish midfielder was named captain, and helped Leeds win the Second Division in 1989–90 and gain promotion back to the First Division. Leeds finished fourth in 1990–91, and in the 1991–92 season they became champions of England for the third time. During the close season Leeds were founder members of the new Premier League, which became the top division of English football. However, the 1992–93 season saw Leeds exiting the Champions League in the early stages, and eventually finishing 17th in the league (having won no away matches in the league), narrowly avoiding relegation. Wilkinson's Leeds were unable to provide any consistent challenge for honours, and his position was not helped by a poor display in the 1996 League Cup final losing to Aston Villa. Leeds United could only finish thirteenth in 1995–96, and after a 4–0 home defeat by Manchester United early in 1996–97, Wilkinson had his contract terminated.

Leeds United appointed George Graham as Wilkinson's successor. This appointment was controversial as Graham had previously received a one-year ban from The Football Association for receiving illegal payments from a football agent. Graham made some astute purchases and also helped blood youngsters from Leeds' youth cup winning side. By the end of the 1997–98 season, Leeds had qualified for the following season's UEFA Cup. In October 1998, Graham left to become manager of Tottenham Hotspur, and Leeds opted to replace him with assistant manager David O'Leary.

Under O'Leary and assistant Eddie Gray, Leeds never finished outside the top five in the Premier League, and secured qualification for both the UEFA Cup and the UEFA Champions League, enjoying cup runs to the semi-finals of both competitions. However, during the same period, the team's image was tarnished when players Jonathan Woodgate and Lee Bowyer were involved in an incident that left an Asian student in hospital with severe injuries. The resulting court case took nearly two years to resolve; Bowyer was cleared, but Woodgate convicted of affray and sentenced to community service. Additionally, in the UEFA Cup semi-final against Galatasaray in Istanbul, two Leeds fans were stabbed to death before the game.

=== 2002–2010: Financial crisis and decline ===
O'Leary was later dismissed; the reasons given were that despite heavy investment in the squad, Leeds had failed to qualify for the Champions League for two consecutive seasons, and there were also reports that O'Leary had lost the confidence of some of the players. O'Leary and chairman Peter Ridsdale also publicly fell out over the proposed sale of Rio Ferdinand to Manchester United. Ridsdale had taken out large loans against the prospect of the share of the TV rights and sponsorship revenues from Champions League qualification and subsequent progress in the competition. Leeds had failed to qualify for the Champions League in two successive seasons, and as a consequence did not receive enough income to repay the loans.

O'Leary was replaced by Terry Venables. Despite Venables being confident of keeping Ferdinand, the defender was sold to Manchester United. Leeds performed woefully under Venables, and other players were sold to repay the loans, including Jonathan Woodgate, whom Ridsdale had promised Venables would not be sold. Tensions mounted between Ridsdale and Venables and, with the team underachieving, Venables was dismissed and replaced by Peter Reid. Ridsdale resigned from the Leeds board and was replaced by existing non-executive director Professor John McKenzie. Leeds were in danger of relegation, but managed to avoid the drop in the penultimate game of the season.

Leeds United gave Peter Reid a permanent contract the following summer and brought in several players on loan. An unsuccessful start to 2003–04 saw Reid dismissed, and Eddie Gray take over as caretaker manager until the end of the season. An insolvency specialist, Gerald Krasner, led a consortium of local businessmen which took over Leeds and oversaw the sale of the club's assets, including senior and emerging youth players of any value. Leeds United were relegated during 2003–04. Following relegation to the Championship, Kevin Blackwell was appointed manager. Most of the remaining players were sold or released on free transfers to further reduce the high wage bill; Blackwell was forced to rebuild almost the entire squad through free transfers, and Leeds United were forced to sell both their training ground and stadium in November 2004.

On 21 January 2005, Ken Bates bought the club. Under Blackwell, Leeds United reached the Championship play-off final, which they lost to Watford. With the team performing poorly, Blackwell's contract was terminated, and hired John Carver as caretaker manager, but his spell was not a success and he was relieved of his duties, with Dennis Wise installed as his replacement on 24 October 2006. Wise was unable to lift the team out of the relegation zone for much of the season, despite bringing in a number of experienced loan players and free transfers on short-term deals. With relegation virtually assured, Leeds entered administration on 4 May 2007, thus incurring a league-imposed 10-point deduction that officially relegated the club to the third tier of English football; the club had previously never played any lower than the second tier.

On 3 July 2007, HM Revenue and Customs (HMRC) lodged a legal challenge to Leeds' Creditors' Voluntary Agreement (CVA). Under league rules, if the club were still in administration at the start of the following season, Leeds would have been prevented from starting their season by the Football League. Following the challenge by HMRC, the club was put up for sale by KPMG, and again Ken Bates' bid was accepted. The league eventually sanctioned this under the "exceptional circumstances rule" but imposed a 15-point deduction due to the club failing to exit administration with a CVA, as the Football League rules required.

On 31 August 2007, HMRC decided not to pursue its legal challenge any further. Wise and his assistant Gus Poyet guided Leeds to a play-off position, only for Poyet to leave for Tottenham, and Wise quitting to take up a position at Newcastle United. Wise was replaced by former club captain Gary McAllister. Leeds went on to secure a place in the play-off final, but were beaten by Doncaster Rovers. McAllister was dismissed after a run of five straight defeats, and was replaced by Blackpool manager Simon Grayson. Leeds made the play-offs once again, but were beaten over two legs by Millwall. Leeds made their best ever start to a season the following campaign, and caused a major upset in the third round of the FA Cup by beating Manchester United at Old Trafford. After an impressive run in the FA Cup, Leeds' league form suffered, however the team rallied and won their final game of the season to confirm promotion to the Championship as runners-up to Norwich City.

=== 2010–2020: Return to the Championship ===
Leeds United spent much of their first season back in the Championship in the play-off places, but eventually finished in seventh place, just missing out on the play-offs. In May 2011, it was announced that chairman Ken Bates had bought the club. Before the match against Middlesbrough, about 300 Leeds fans protested about what they saw as a lack of investment in the playing side, to which Bates responded by calling the protesters "morons". Despite securing promotion to the Championship, Grayson was dismissed on 1 February 2012 after failing to mount a consistent challenge for promotion to the Premier League. Neil Warnock was appointed as the club's new manager, with his initial contract lasting until the end of the following season.

On 21 November 2012, Middle East-based private equity group GFH Capital finalised a deal for a protracted takeover of Leeds United, gaining a 100% shareholding in the club. It was also announced Ken Bates would remain as chairman until the end of the season, and then become club president. The takeover was officially completed on 21 December 2012. Despite runs to the quarter-finals of the League Cup and the fifth round of the FA Cup (albeit with both runs ending in five-goal thrashings, by Chelsea and Manchester City respectively), Leeds' league form was generally mediocre, with the club never making any real challenge for the play-off places. Warnock resigned and was replaced by Brian McDermott. Leeds won three of their final five games of the season, enough to avoid relegation. Ken Bates later stepped down as chairman, and ultimately left the club altogether following a dispute over expenses.

On 7 January 2014, Sport Capital came close to completing a transaction with GFH Capital that would have given them a 75% stake in the business. On 30 January, Sport Capital's takeover collapsed due to a lack of "financial backing". Haigh released a statement conceding that it was unable to complete a deal despite two months ago agreeing to purchase a 75% stake in the club from the owners Gulf Finance House. Haigh said he and Sport Capital had "injected substantial sums into the club to ensure its viability" but earlier in the week fellow consortium member Andrew Flowers, the managing director of Leeds' shirt sponsor Enterprise Insurance, stated that GFH had "breached their covenant with us" after inviting a rival bid from Massimo Cellino, the president of Serie A side Cagliari Calcio. Haigh's statement read:

As fans know, we signed a share acquisition agreement with GFH Capital at the end of last year. This meant, I believed, that we were in a position to move things forward and complete the transaction in time for the January transfer window. ... Unfortunately, however, some of the consortium's backers ultimately didn't feel able to deliver the financial backing we had hoped was agreed to take the club forward.

On 31 January 2014, under controversial circumstances, it was reported that manager Brian McDermott had been removed from his position following a string of poor results, while the controversy surrounding the club was resolved. By 3 February, the BBC was reporting that McDermott had been called by a lawyer representing Massimo Cellino "and told he had been relieved of his duties". However, Cellino still did not own the club, as the Football League had not yet approved his purchase, so neither he nor his lawyer could dismiss the manager. McDermott, therefore, remained in his post. On 7 February, Leeds announced that they had exchanged contracts for the sale of the club to Cellino's family consortium Eleonora Sport Ltd. The deal saw the Cellino family acquire a 75% ownership of the club, subject to Football League Approval. On 23 March, the board of the Football League decided unanimously that Cellino's conviction by an Italian court meant that he did not meet its owners and directors test, so he could not take over. In the backdrop of Cellino's takeover, Leeds suffered an appalling second half of the season, dropping from the play-off places to the fringes of the relegation battle. In the end, the weak performances of the teams below meant that they were never in any real danger of going down, and a late run of wins put survival beyond doubt well before the end of the season. However, McDermott resigned as manager.

On 5 April 2014, Cellino was successful in his appeal with independent QC Tim Kerr to take over the club. The takeover was completed on 10 April, with Cellino's company, Eleonora Sport Limited, buying 75% of the club's shares. Dave Hockaday was surprisingly appointed as head coach, but was dismissed two months later. Darko Milanič was appointed as his replacement, becoming the club's first manager from outside the British isles and the first Slovene manager in English football, but left the club the following month. Neil Redfearn was appointed as his replacement. On 1 December, Cellino was disqualified by the Football League after it obtained documents from an Italian court, where he was found guilty of tax evasion. Cellino was disqualified from running the club until 10 April 2015, and on 24 February, Cellino announced he would not be returning to the club after his ban ended. Neil Redfearn was replaced by Uwe Rösler, but he himself was replaced by Steve Evans after a few months in the role.

On 30 October 2015, Cellino agreed a deal in principle with Leeds Fans Utd to sell a majority stake in the club. When asked to legally commit to an exclusivity period to allow due diligence to commence, he reneged. Garry Monk was appointed as the club's new head coach, replacing Steve Evans. On 4 January 2017, Italian businessman Andrea Radrizzani purchased a 50% stake in the club from Massimo Cellino. Leeds narrowly missed out on the play-offs, having been in them for the majority of the season before a poor run of form in the final four games of the season saw them drop into seventh place, they were also knocked out of the FA Cup by National League side Sutton United.

On 23 May 2017, Radrizzani announced a 100% buyout of Leeds United, buying the remaining 50% shares from previous co-owner Massimo Cellino, with Radrizzani taking full ownership of the club. Garry Monk resigned as head coach two days after the takeover, after one season at the club in which he guided them to seventh place. On 15 June 2017, former Spain international Thomas Christiansen was announced as the new head coach. This was followed by Radrizzani introducing Leeds United Women back to Leeds United ownership. Also, Radrizzani completed the purchase of Elland Road from Jacob Adler's company, Teak Commercial Limited for £20 million, using his own company Greenfield Investment Pte Ltd. Thomas Christiansen was dismissed and replaced with Barnsley manager Paul Heckingbottom on 6 February 2018. In May 2018, 49ers Enterprises, the business arm of the San Francisco 49ers, bought shares in the club to become a minority investor.

On 1 June 2018, Heckingbottom was dismissed after four months and was replaced with Marcelo Bielsa. Bielsa's first season in charge saw Leeds make an impressive start and remain in the top two with Norwich City for the majority of the season, on course for automatic promotion to the Premier League. However, a poor end to the season saw the team lose out on automatic promotion to Sheffield United. Leeds entered the play-offs against Derby County; despite winning the first leg 1–0, they ultimately lost 4–3 on aggregate which consigned them to another season in the Championship.

=== 2020–present: Promotion, relegation and subsequent promotion ===
On 17 July 2020, after sixteen years out of the Premier League, Leeds were promoted back to the top flight following West Bromwich Albion's loss to Huddersfield Town. Stoke City's defeat of Brentford the following day confirmed they would go up as winners of the Championship. Leeds had been in the top two for most of the season and had never dropped lower than fifth in the table, eventually going on to finish ten points clear of West Brom in second place.

The club's first season back in the Premier League produced a top half finish, their points tally was the most by a newly promoted side since Ipswich Town two decades earlier. However, the following season was not as successful and following a series of poor results, Bielsa was dismissed by the club in February 2022. Jesse Marsch was appointed as Bielsa's replacement, and he successfully led the club to avoid relegation on the final day of the season. Marsch was dismissed by the club in February 2023, and was replaced by Javi Gracia. Gracia was dismissed on 3 May 2023, having won just three of his twelve games in charge, and was replaced by Sam Allardyce, in the hope, he could avoid relegation for the second successive season. However, he was unable to prevent relegation as Leeds dropped back into the Championship on the final day of the season.

With Allardyce having left the club after relegation, Daniel Farke was appointed as manager on 4 July 2023. Farke had previously won the Championship twice with Norwich City. On 18 July, 49ers Enterprises, then owning 44% of the shares in the club, reached agreement with Radrizzani to purchase the remaining 56% in a complete takeover. Leeds missed out on promotion in their first season back in the Championship after losing the play-off final to Southampton. While recording a pre-tax loss of £60.8million, the club recorded £43.2m in commercial income for the 2023–24 campaign, the highest recorded in the Championship and surpassing the club's own 2019–20 record of £33.8m.

After a slow start to the 2024–25 season, Leeds moved into 2nd place in the table on 18 October when they beat Sheffield United 2–0 at Elland Road. They were not to leave the top 3 again that season; as early pace-setters Sunderland faltered, the race for promotion developed into a three-way battle with Sheffield United and Burnley. After a loss to Blackburn Rovers at the end of November, Leeds went on a three-month unbeaten run which included wins over rivals Sheffield United and Sunderland, and a 7–0 win over Cardiff City at Elland Road. However, one victory in five games during March saw Leeds briefly drop to 3rd in the table, before a run of three wins, coupled with three unexpected defeats for Sheffield United, left them on the brink of promotion. On 21 April, Leeds beat Stoke City 6–0 at Elland Road, before Burnley beat Sheffield United in a later kick off, meaning that both were promoted automatically. A late win at Plymouth Argyle on the last day of the season confirmed Leeds as winners of the Championship title.

Leeds United’s return to the Premier League in 2025 had several memorable moments, including home and away draws against Liverpool, a 3-1 victory over Chelsea and most notably, a 2-1 win over rivals Manchester United at Old Trafford for the first time since 1981. The club also guaranteed safety from relegation on 10 May thanks to Arsenal defeating West Ham United 1-0 at London Stadium. Additionally, Leeds enjoyed a stellar FA Cup run, reaching the semi-finals for the first time since 1987, before falling to Chelsea 0-1.

== Colours ==
Leeds United's first kit was modelled on Huddersfield Town's blue and white striped shirts, white shorts and dark blue socks with blue and white rings on the turnovers, because Huddersfield's chairman Hilton Crowther was attempting to merge the two clubs. Leeds later ditched their blue and white stripes in favour of blue and gold halved shirts, incorporating the city crest badge; the shorts were white and socks blue with gold tops. Leeds then switched to old gold shirts finished with blue sleeves and collars, white shorts and black, blue and gold hooped socks. Black shorts later replaced the white ones on the grounds of improved visibility. Leeds later changed again, this time to royal blue shirts with gold collars, white shorts and blue and gold hooped socks, a kit that echoed that worn originally by Leeds City. In 1961–62, a plain all-white strip throughout was introduced.

== Badge ==
Leeds United's first badge appeared in 1934. Like Leeds City before them, the club adopted the coat of arms of Leeds, which remained on the kit in various guises until 1961. For a number of seasons after 1961–62, when the all-white strip replaced the blue and gold, the shirts sported no badge at all. A perching owl badge was added to the strip in 1964. The design was a surprise given Revie's superstition about the symbolism of birds. The owl derived from the three owls that feature on the city's coat of arms, which in turn were taken from the coat of arms of Sir John Savile, the first alderman of Leeds. The owl was usually navy blue, but was coloured gold for the 1968 League Cup Final.

Between 1971 and 1973, Leeds used the "LUFC" script that runs down the centre of the current badge, albeit in a diagonal fashion rather than the present vertical. The script made a reappearance on the 'retro-look' Asics kit used during 1995–96. In 1973, came the embodiment of 1970s imagery with the iconic "Smiley" badge, made up of the letters L and U in bubble writing. Revie's predilection for gimmicks was years ahead of its time, and done with the explicit intention of gaining acceptance from a public outside West Yorkshire. In 1976, a mirror image of the crest was used with the colours reversed out which made the "LU" conceit easier to see. This was dropped the following season and replaced with a new design that placed the (original) Smiley badge inside a roundel bearing the club's name. In 1980, a new badge appeared that was similar to that of the previous season, except now the club's name enclosed a stylised Peacock (a reference to the club's nickname, "The Peacocks").

In 1984, another badge was introduced. The distinctive rose and ball badge used the traditional blue, gold and white colours, and incorporated the White Rose of York, the club's name, and a football (a truncated icosahedron similar to the Adidas Telstar, but in Leeds colours) in the core section. In 1998, the club logo was replaced with a more "European" shield design. The shield retained the white rose, as well as the blue, gold and white colours, with "LUFC" reading vertically down the centre. In 1999, the badge was slightly amended in that the football from the 1984 badge was added to the centre of the white rose.

== Stadium ==
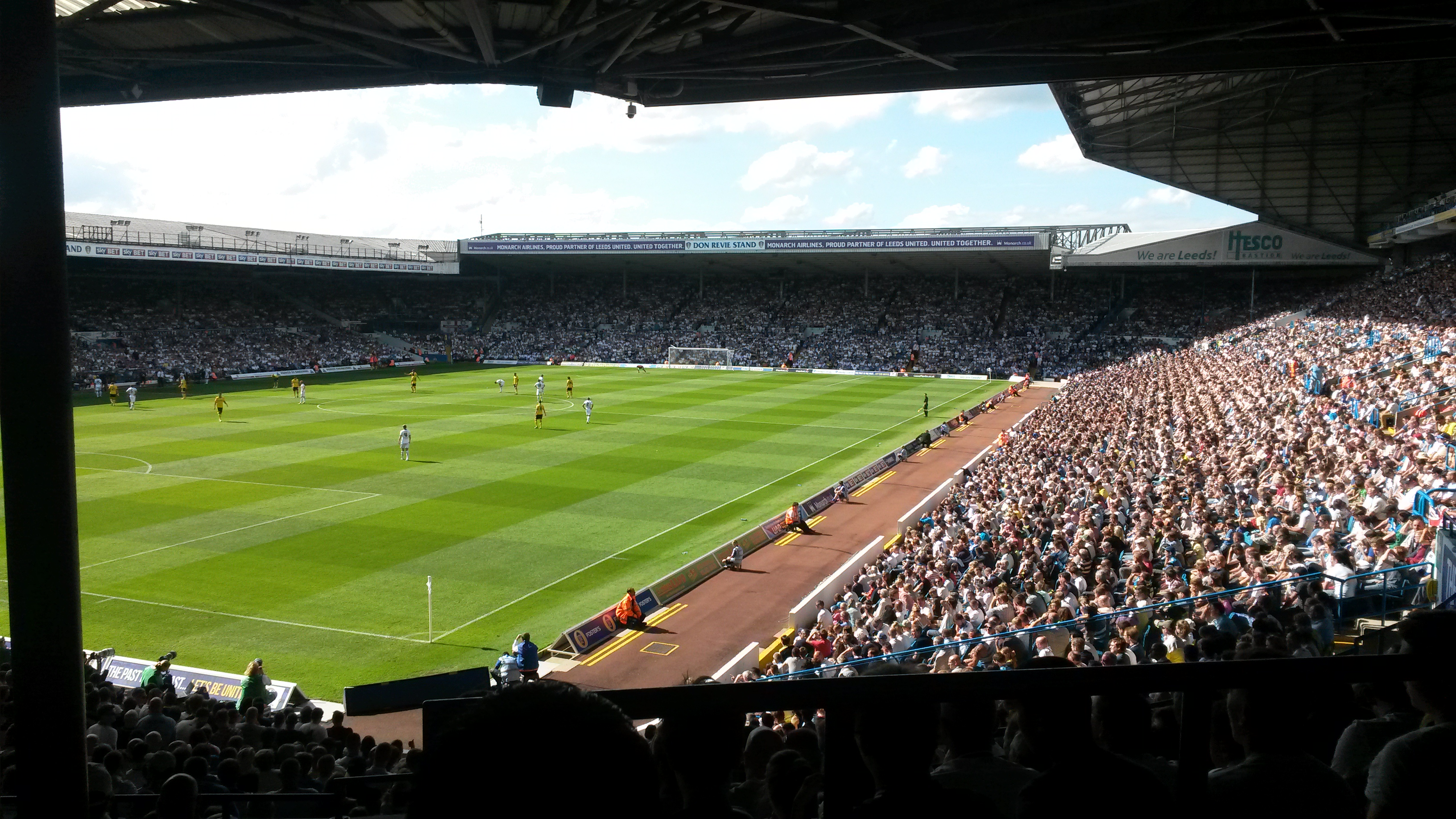
Elland Road, 2013

Leeds United's home ground since their formation has been Elland Road, situated in Beeston, Leeds, West Yorkshire, England, it is the 14th largest football stadium in England and was previously occupied by their predecessors Leeds City before their disbanding. Leeds City Council allowed them to rent the stadium until they could afford to buy it. With the exception of periods from the 1960s until 1983, and from 1997 to 2004, the local council owned the stadium. However, it was sold by the club in October 2004, with a 25-year sale-leaseback deal being agreed, and a commercial buy-back clause also included for when the club's finances improve sufficiently.

Initially, the ground was the home of the Holbeck Rugby Club, which played in the Northern Rugby Union, the forerunner of the Rugby Football League. One of Leeds' first nicknames, 'The Peacocks', comes from the original name of Elland Road – 'The Old Peacock Ground'. It was named by the original owners of the ground, Bentley's Brewery, after its pub The Old Peacock, which still faces the site. Newly formed Leeds City agreed to rent and later own Elland Road. After their disbandment, it was sold to Leeds United. Elland Road's largest, and most recent renovation involved demolishing the old Lowfields Road stand to build a new 17,000-seater, two-tiered East Stand. It was completed for the 1993–94 season and was, at the time, the largest cantilever stand in the world. Elland Road later became an all-seater stadium, with nearly 7,000 seats replacing the terracing in the Kop, as directed by the Taylor Report.

== Supporters ==
In 2003, Peter Reid commented on the support at Elland Road after being relieved of his managerial duties, saying that "In 30 years I've never seen support like I did at the Leeds/Arsenal game a couple of weeks ago. The fans at Leeds are fantastic." Two other former Leeds managers have also spoken highly of the club's supporters; Kevin Blackwell said "fans will follow them everywhere" and David O'Leary commented "There is an immense fan base and they are still with the club".

Leeds United supporters are renowned for singing the signature song "Marching On Together" before and during matches. Other notable songs Leeds fans sing during games include "We Are The Champions, Champions of Europe" (more commonly known as WACCOE) in reference to the 1975 European Cup Final which Leeds lost due to dubious refereeing decisions. Riots by the Leeds fans during the match led to UEFA banning the club from European competition for four years, although this was reduced to two years on appeal. Supporters also have their own salute.

An LGBT fans' group, Marching Out Together, was formed in 2017 and sits on the club's Supporters' Advisory Group. There is also a group for Sikh supporters, called Punjabi Whites. The Leeds United Disabled Organisation (LUDO) was founded in 1992. There is a well-known hooligan firm amongst the fans known as the Leeds United Service Crew.

== Rivalries ==
Leeds United's main rivals are widely considered to be Manchester United. As the largest cities within the historic counties of Yorkshire and Lancashire, animosity between the regions date back to the Wars of the Roses, although more recent tensions between the football clubs date back to the 1960s and the iconic managers of Don Revie and Matt Busby. The rivalry has been described as one of the fiercest in world football, and the most intense and inexplicable in England. Alex Ferguson described Elland Road as 'hostile' and 'frightening', and stated that the ferocity of games between the two surpassed the ones with Liverpool. The two clubs have competed for league titles and cups in the 1960s, 1970s, 1990s, and early 2000s; while players such as Johnny Giles, Gordon Strachan, and Eric Cantona have been highly successful after moving between the clubs.

Leeds United also share a fierce rivalry with Chelsea, which largely stems from the 1970 FA Cup Final. It has been ranked among the greatest ever FA Cup finals, and named as the "most brutal game" in English football history, due to the large number of fouls committed by both teams. The two clubs competed at the top end of the Premier League in the late 1990s and early 2000s and games were often bad-tempered. While the rivalry had subsided with Leeds' relegation, controversial figures such as Ken Bates and Dennis Wise – both of whom had long associations with Chelsea – presided over the club's relegation to League One in 2007 and subsequent administration, prolonging the enmity.

Leeds United fans also hold extreme bitterness towards Turkish side Galatasaray following the deaths of two supporters the night before a UEFA Cup semi-final in Istanbul in April 2000. During the game, Galatasaray supporters mocked the deaths, while their team refused to wear black armbands. Then chairman Peter Ridsdale accused the club of 'lacking common decency'.

== Music ==
"Leeds United" was a single released in April 1972 to coincide with the team reaching the 1972 FA Cup final, composed by Les Reed and Barry Mason with the team providing the vocals. It stayed in the UK Singles Chart for almost three months, peaking at number 10. The B-side "Leeds! Leeds! Leeds!" (commonly known as Marching On Together) has since become the club's anthem and is regularly sung by supporters.

== Records ==
Chart of yearly performance of Leeds United in the English Football League system.

Jack Charlton holds the record for the most appearances for the club, having made 773 first team appearances between 1952 and 1973. Peter Lorimer is the club's record goal scorer, scoring 238 goals across two spells. John Charles scored the most goals for the club in a single season, 43 in 1953–54. Lucas Radebe is the most capped international for the club, making 69 appearances for South Africa.

Leeds United's record home attendance is 57,892 against Sunderland on 15 March 1967. Their highest league attendance is 56,796 against Arsenal on 27 December 1932. This was before their stadium became an all-seater venue, their highest modern attendance is 40,287 against Newcastle United on 22 December 2001.

Leeds United's highest ever league finish is first in the First Division in the 1968–69, 1973–74 and 1991–92 seasons. Their lowest ever league finish was fifth in League One in 2007–08, finishing the season by losing to Doncaster Rovers in the play-off final. This was their first ever season in the third tier of English football.

Leeds United's longest ever unbeaten run in the league was between 19 October 1968 and 30 August 1969, to which they remained unbeaten for thirty-four games on their way to the First Division title. Their longest run of consecutive victories in the league is nine, which they achieved between 26 September 1931 and 21 November 1931 (in the Second Division) and also between 1 January and 23 February 2024 (in the Championship).

== Players ==
=== First-team squad ===
As of 2 September 2026

Note: Flags indicate national team as defined under FIFA eligibility rules; some limited exceptions apply. Players may hold more than one non-FIFA nationality.

No.	Pos.	Nation	Player
1	GK	ENG	James Trafford
2	DF	ENG	Jayden Bogle
3	DF	SWE	Gabriel Gudmundsson
4	MF	WAL	Ethan Ampadu (captain)
5	DF	BIH	Tarik Muharemović
6	DF	WAL	Joe Rodon
7	MF	WAL	Daniel James
8	MF	ENG	Sean Longstaff
9	FW	ENG	Dominic Calvert-Lewin
10	MF	WAL	Harry Wilson
11	MF	USA	Brenden Aaronson
14	FW	GER	Lukas Nmecha

No.	Pos.	Nation	Player
15	DF	SLO	Jaka Bijol
16	GK	GER	Michael Zetterer
18	MF	GER	Anton Stach
19	FW	SUI	Noah Okafor
21	GK	ENG	Alex Cairns
22	MF	JPN	Ao Tanaka
23	FW	FRA	Jean-Mattéo Bahoya (on loan from Eintracht Frankfurt)
24	DF	ENG	James Justin
26	DF	FRA	Melvin Bard (on loan from Nice)
30	DF	SUI	Nico Elvedi
44	MF	BUL	Ilia Gruev
65	DF	WAL	Jayden Lienou

=== Other players under contract ===
Note: Flags indicate national team as defined under FIFA eligibility rules; some limited exceptions apply. Players may hold more than one non-FIFA nationality.

No.	Pos.	Nation	Player
—	FW	ESP	Mateo Joseph

=== Out on loan ===
Note: Flags indicate national team as defined under FIFA eligibility rules; some limited exceptions apply. Players may hold more than one non-FIFA nationality.

No.	Pos.	Nation	Player
29	FW	ITA	Wilfried Gnonto (at Fiorentina until 30 June 2027)
33	DF	BEL	Sebastiaan Bornauw (at Hamburg until 30 June 2027)
42	MF	SCO	Sam Chambers (at Northampton Town until 30 June 2027)

No.	Pos.	Nation	Player
—	GK	BRA	Lucas Perri (at Torino until 30 June 2027)
—	FW	SUR	Joël Piroe (at West Ham United until 30 June 2027)
—	FW	BEL	Largie Ramazani (at Burnley until 30 June 2027)

== Management ==
=== First-team staff ===
Position	Staff
First team manager	Daniel Farke
First team assistant manager	Eddie Riemer
First team coach	Christopher John
Performance coach	Chris Domogalla
Goalkeeper coach	Ed Wootten
Loans manager	Andrew Taylor

=== Medical team ===
Position	Staff
Head of medicine	Henry McStay
Lead first team physio	Daryl Carter
Rehab and fitness conditioning coach	Rubén Crespo
Performance analyst	Matthew Jenkins
Sports scientist	Jack Pullan
Lead strength and conditioning coach	Paraskevas Polychronopoulos
Data analyst	Ashmeet Anand
Senior first team physio	Billy Atton
Senior first team physio	Cian McCaffrey
Junior assistant physio	Sam Callaghan
Sports therapist	Aimee Last
Club doctor	Rishi Dhand
Performance nutritionist	Elise McVicar

=== Scouting and recruitment team ===
Position	Staff
Head of recruitment	Alex Davies
Head of football administration	Hannah Cox
Head of emerging talent	Craig Dean
Technical scout	Josh Hobbs
Technical scout	Callum Cooke
European scout	Dorian Dervite
European scout	Guy Ipoua

=== Owners and directors ===
Leeds United Football Club Limited ('LUFC') owners	49ers Enterprises
Honorary president	David Lascelles, 8th Earl of Harewood
Chairman	Paraag Marathe
Vice chairman	Andrew Schwartzberg
Executive vice chairman	Peter McCormick
Director	Andreas Dracopoulos
Director	Peter Lowy
Director	Eugene Schneur
Chief business officer	Morrie Eisenberg
Chief financial officer	Fay Greer
Managing director	Robbie Evans
Sporting director	Adam Underwood

== Managers ==
Daniel Farke is the forty-first permanent holder of the position since the club were founded. Leeds have also had ten caretaker managers, three of whom had previously occupied the role on a full-time basis, and one of whom occupied the role three times. Leeds' most successful manager is Don Revie, who won two First Division titles, two Inter-Cities Fairs Cups, one Second Division title, one FA Cup, one League Cup, and one Charity Shield in his 13-year reign as manager. He is also the club's longest-serving manager, presiding over 740 games from 1961 to 1974.

== Honours ==
Type	Competition	Titles	Seasons
Domestic	First Division	3	1968–69, 1973–74, 1991–92
Domestic	Second Division/ Championship	5	1923–24, 1963–64, 1989–90, 2019–20, 2024–25
Domestic	FA Cup	1	1971–72
Domestic	Football League Cup	1	1967–68
Domestic	FA Charity Shield	2	1969, 1992
Continental	Inter-Cities Fairs Cup	2	1967–68, 1970–71
