= Vamos (disambiguation) =

Vamos is a small town and municipality on the island of Crete, Greece.

Vamos or Vámos may also refer to:

== People ==
- Grace Vamos (1898-1992), American cellist, composer and educator
- Igor Vamos (born 1968), an American multimedia artist and academic
- István Vámos (born 1958), a Hungarian gymnast
- Márton Vámos (born 1992), a Hungarian water polo player
- Miklós Vámos (born 1950), a Hungarian writer and talkshow host
- Petra Vámos (born 2000), a Hungarian handballer
- Roland and Almita Vamos, violin and viola instructors
- Thomas Vámos (born 1938), a Hungarian-Canadian cinematographer
- Youri Vámos, Hungarian ballet dancer
- Zoltan Vamoș (1936–2001), a Romanian middle-distance runner

== Political organisations ==
- Chile Vamos
- Vamos Uruguay
- Vamos (Guatemala)

== Other uses ==
- Vamos (football chant), from Peru
- Honda Vamos, the name of two different vehicles
- "Vamos", a song by the Pixies from the 1987 EP Come On Pilgrim
- "Vamos", an episode of The Good Doctor
