= Duser =

Duser is a surname. Notable people with the surname include:

- Carl Duser (1932–2023), American baseball player
- Guy Van Duser (born 1948), American guitarist
