= Football chant =

Song or chant usually sung at association football matches by fans

Fans of Boca Juniors chanting "El que no salta, se fue a la B" (He who doesn't jump went to B) in the streets of Buenos Aires, an example of a chant targeting a rival club (the chant mocks their rival team River Plate who were once relegated to the Nacional B division.)

A football chant or terrace chant is a form of vocalisation performed by supporters of association football, typically during football matches. Football chanting is an expression of collective identity, most often used by fans to express their pride in the team they support, or to encourage them, and to celebrate a particular player or manager. Fans may also use football chants to slight the opposition, and many fans sing songs about their club rivals, even when they are not playing them. Sometimes the chants are spontaneous reactions to events on the pitch.

Football chants can be simple, consisting of a few loud shouts or spoken words, but more often they are short lines of lyrics and sometimes longer songs. They are typically performed repetitively, sometimes accompanied by handclapping, but occasionally they may be more elaborate involving musical instruments, props or choreographed routines. They are often adaptations of popular songs, using their tunes as the basis of the chants, but some are original.

Football chants are known to have been used by fans from the late 19th century onwards, but developed into the current popular forms in the 1960s. Football chants can be historic, dating back as early as the formation of the club popularly sung down the years and considered the anthems for these clubs. They may also be popular for only a relatively short time, with new chants being constantly created and discarded. The tradition of football chants varies from country to country and team to team, but some chants are common to many clubs and popular internationally. Football chants may be considered one of the last remaining sources of an oral folk song tradition.

== History ==
Football chants may be considered modern examples of traditional storytelling and folk songs. According to folk singer Martin Carthy, football chants are "the one surviving embodiment of an organic living folk tradition." It is also a unique public expression of collective identity, and football chants may be seen as modern examples of the folk tradition blason populaire where a group vocalise their identity as well as their rivalry against another group.

=== Early chants ===
Football fans' vocalisations came in the forms of cries, chants and songs in the 19th century. War cries were known to have been used by football fans from the 1880s onwards, with the earliest recorded in Scotland after the Scottish Cup final of 1887. The first known song that references football, "The Dooley Fitba' Club" later known as "'Fitba' Crazy", was also written in the 1880s by James Curran, although it was intended for the music hall rather than the terrace. It was also recorded in the 1890s that Sheffield United fans had adopted a music hall song, the "Rowdy Dowdy Boys", while Southampton fans sang a "Yi! Yi! Yi!" chant based on a war cry. Blackburn Rovers fans were reported to have chanted "We've won the cup before – many a time" before their 1891 FA Cup Final match against Notts County. Composer Sir Edward Elgar wrote a football song in honour of the Wolverhampton Wanderers striker, Billy Malpass, after watching a match in February 1898 between Wolves and Stoke City. However, the anthem he wrote, "He Banged The Leather For Goal", never caught on among fans on the terrace.

The oldest football song in the world that is still in use today may be "On the Ball, City", a song believed to have been composed in the 1890s by Albert T Smith, who became a director of Norwich City in 1905. The song was adopted by fans of the club and it is still sung by Norwich's fans. Such club song may have its origin in the public school system, while others have links with working-class music hall. Other early football chants still sung today include "Pompey Chimes" or "Play up, Pompey" sung by Portsmouth fans since the 1920s and based on the Westminster Quarters (a form of the chant is believed to have been sung at Fratton Park in the 1890s and was officially published in 1900, therefore it is arguably older than "On the Ball, City"), and "Blaydon Races", a Geordie folk song from 1862, which was adopted by Newcastle United fans in the 1930s. Some of the songs sung at football ground by the 1920s were modified from popular music hall songs, for example "Kick, Kick, Kick, Kick, Kick it" from "Chick, Chick, Chick, Chick, Chicken" and "Keep the Forwards Scoring" from "Keep the Home Fires Burning". Chants that referenced players were also heard on the terrace; For example, "Give it to Ballie" chanted by Swansea fans in reference to a player name Billy Ball who played for the club in 1912-1920.

Football chants in the early years were club-specific and they were generally friendly or jocular in tone. Songs with sectarian overtones, however, had been sung at matches between Rangers and Celtic in the 1920s, which became more overtly confrontational in later decades, raising the possibility that sectarianism may have been the origin of oppositional chanting and singing at football matches. Fans of the early period also had a limited repertoire of chants, which become more varied as singing was encouraged by the use of brass bands before games and the community singing movement that arose in the 1920s (the tradition of singing "Abide with Me" at FA Cup finals started in this period).

=== 1960s developments ===
While various elements of football chants were already present in the early period, it was in the 1960s that the nature of football chants started to change and modern football chants emerged to become an integral part of fan culture and experience. The catalyst for the change may be due to a number of factors; one suggestion is the growth and evolution of youth culture in this period which, together with popular music started being played over the public announcement system at matches instead of brass bands, encouraged fans to start their own singing based on popular tunes. Another suggestion is the mixing of fan cultures from different countries through international football matches that started to be broadcast, such as the 1959 England's tour of South America and the 1962 World Cup. The exposure to intense chanting by South American and Italian fans during the 1962 and 1966 World Cups may have encouraged British fans who were previously more reserved to do the same. They also picked up different type of chants from other countries; Liverpool fans for example, may have used a Brazilian chant "Brazil, cha-cha-cha" and turned it into the "Li-ver-pool, [clap, clap, clap]" chant.

Chants became more extensive in the 1960s, and popular songs became increasingly common as the basis of chants as fans adapted these songs to reflect situations and events relevant to them. Chanting the name of the team, chants for players and managers started to become prevalent. Liverpool supporters, particularly those on the Kop, were known for modifying songs in the early 1960s to suit their own purposes, and this practice quickly spread to fans of other clubs who created their own versions after hearing these chants often directed at them. Repertoire of chants credited to Liverpool fans included the rhythmic clapping based on "Let's Go" by The Routers, the chorus from "We Shall Not Be Moved", and "When the Saints Go Marching In" used to honour Ian St John, chants which were then also adopted by fans of other clubs. Fans of many clubs now have a large and constantly evolving repertoire of chants in addition to a smaller number of songs closely associated with their club.

A more controversial aspect of this period of change was that abusive chants targeted at rival team or fans also became widespread. These may be taunts and insults aimed at the opposition teams or players to unnerve them, or obscene or slanderous chants targeted at individuals. A sampling of English football chants in the late 1970s found these types of chants to be the most numerous. Threats of violence may also be made to their rivals in chants; although such threats were rarely carried out, fights did occur which, together with increasing level of hooliganism in that period, gave these threats a real edge. Some abuses are racial in nature; for example, anti-Semitic chants directed at Tottenham Hotspur began in the 1960s, also against the Argentine club Atlanta (commonly heard in the 1960s but may have begun as early as the 1940s), and against the Dutch club Ajax in the 1970s. Racist insults directed at black players began to be heard in the 1970s and 1980s in England and Spain when black players started appearing in their leagues in increasing numbers. Concerns over the abusive nature of some of these chants later led to measures in various countries to control them, for example, the British government made racist and indecent chants an offence in the UK in 1991. In Italy, the Mancino law was used to prosecute fans for inciting racism, and fans were excluded from their ground for derogatory chants. Despite efforts to stop them, some chants remain an issue around the world, such as the "Eh puto" chant used by Mexican fans, and racist chants in many countries.

=== International spread ===
As the sport of football spread to other countries, so did its associated fan culture of football chants. Many countries, however, have developed their own tradition of football songs and chants; for example, most Italian clubs have their own official hymns, often written specially for the club by a prominent singer or composer who is a fan of the club. Many countries also have football chants dating from the early part of the 20th century, and clubs such as Real Madrid may have an official club song as early as 1903. Football chants created in different countries may be specific to the local culture. Hand-clapping chants were popular in South American countries such as Brazil before it spread to other countries. Some chants originated from other sports; for example, the "two, four, six, eight!" chant that was used for sports in the United States from the early 20th century was adopted by football fans in the UK in the 1950s. The "Olé" chant from bullfighting is believed to be first used in Brazil for Garrincha in 1958, and one version of the "Olé, Olé, Olé" chant was first heard at a league game in Spain in 1982, while another version quickly spread around Europe in 1986 and became widely popular around the world. In Italy, the development of the ultra fan culture with their passionate theatrical display of support including choreographed singing and chanting conducted by a leader has also been influential in many other countries.

As football fans travel to other countries on away international matches, and international broadcasts of football matches are common, fans from around the world often picked up chants from other clubs and countries, and some chants spread in an organic manner and become popular internationally. An example is the chant based on "Seven Nation Army" by The White Stripes – it was first adopted by fans of Belgian Club Brugge KV in 2003, their chant was then picked by Italian fans, and it was made an unofficial anthem for the Italy national football team in the 2006 FIFA World Cup, following which it spread to other football clubs around the world as well as beyond football into other sports and events.

== Common types of chants ==
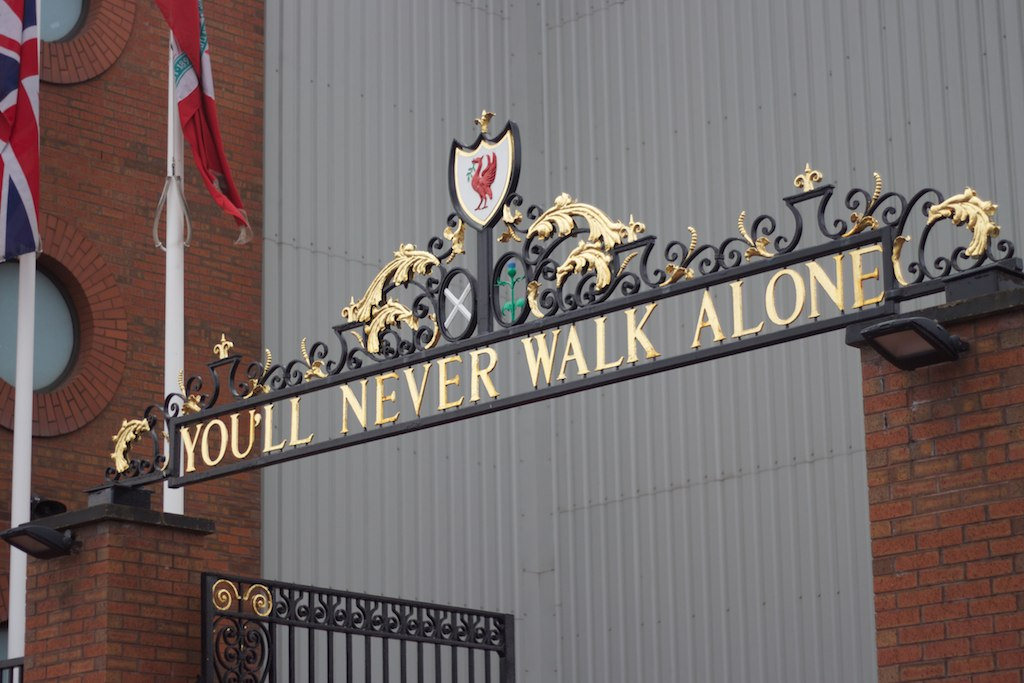
The song "You'll Never Walk Alone" has become the club anthem for Liverpool F.C.

A wide variety of football chants exist, some of the more popular ones may be grouped into the following types:

- Anthems – These are songs that are closely associated with a club, and are commonly sung by fans to express their collective identity. Unlike other types of chants that are variations of widely-used chants, these songs tend to be unique to a particular club. The best-known example may be "You'll Never Walk Alone" sung by Liverpool fans, although it has also been adopted by a few other clubs such as Celtic and Borussia Dortmund. Other notable club anthems include "Blue Moon" (Manchester City), "I'm Forever Blowing Bubbles" (West Ham United), "No one likes us, we don't care" (Millwall), "Stern des Südens" (Bayern Munich), and "Cant del Barça" (Barcelona). Some anthems are written specially for the club, for example "Marching On Together" for Leeds United, and more recently "Hala Madrid y nada más" for Real Madrid, but many are popular songs that for whatever reason have become identified with the club.
  Chelsea fans chanting after an away win with 3 different examples of chants; their first chant simply repeats the name of the club, the second praises their manager ("Super Frank Lampard"), the third a version of the "Olé, Olé, Olé" chant
- Engagement with the team – These chants come in various forms. They may be expression of pride or loyalty in the club or team, or identity as fans of the club. At the simplest, the chants may just be repetitions of the name of the team, often with clapping (e.g. clap, clap, clap 3×, clap 4×, [name of club]), or they may identify themselves, e.g. "We are the [name for fans or home stand]". These also includes songs commonly sung at the club, such as "When the [name of team] Go Marching In". The chants may also praise the team, individual players or managers. Typically popular tunes are used for this type of chants, for example, "There's only one [name of player]" sung to the tune of "Guantanamera", "Super [name of player or team]", or the "Olé, Olé, Olé" chant. The chants may give encouragement to the team, for example, "Come on you [name of team]", "Vamos [name of team]", "Allez [name of team]". They may be expression of confidence and optimism, suggesting that their team will win a game, the league, be promoted, or win a major cup tie at venues such as Wembley. There may also be expressions of dissatisfaction, such as criticism of the team when they are performing poorly, or calling for the manager to resign, and occasionally against the owner of the club.
  Example of an insulting chant – Tottenham fans chanting to Sol Campbell who had joined their rivals Arsenal ("Stick Sol Campbell up your Arse") while celebrating Ledley King
- Insults, threats or expressions of hatred or mockery directed at the opponents – There are large variations in this type of chants. The chants may target the team (for example, "Stand up if you hate [name of team]", "You're shit"). Chants may be aimed at individual players or managers, and these can range from the amusing to the offensive or obscene. For example, "Who Ate All the Pies?" may be used against a player considered fat, or racist chants directed at black players. Chants may sometimes reflect players or managers in the news, or they may be made-up accusations directed against them that can be sung in either a humorous or offensive manner. Chants may target fans or home grounds of the opponents (e.g. "My garden shed is bigger than this" or "Is this a library"), and may also refer to events in their rivals' club history, sometimes in highly offensive manner (see Tragedy chanting below). Fans may also use parodies of their rivals' anthems, for example, singing "sign on, sign on ... you'll never get a job" to the tune of "You'll Never Walk Alone" started at a time when there was high unemployment in Liverpool. On occasion, chants may be self-deprecating, such as the chant "We lose every week, we lose every week / You're nothing special / We lose every week".
- Reactions to events that happened on the pitch or off the pitch, these may be in celebration of a goal (e.g. "two-nil") or aiming to disrupt, or are expressions of boredom. They may also be comments about the officials such as the referees (e.g. "the referee's a wanker"), or the policing.
- Atmospheric chants – Sounds aimed at creating interest or excitement in the game without any specific message, such as long drawn-out "oooooh" and "arrrrrgh", or "la la la la la ..."

=== Tragedy chanting ===
Tragedy chanting involves chanting about an opposition club's tragedies or tragic events that happen in their home cities. Instances in English football include exchanges between Manchester United and Leeds United fans, and between Manchester United and Liverpool fans.

== Spoken chants ==
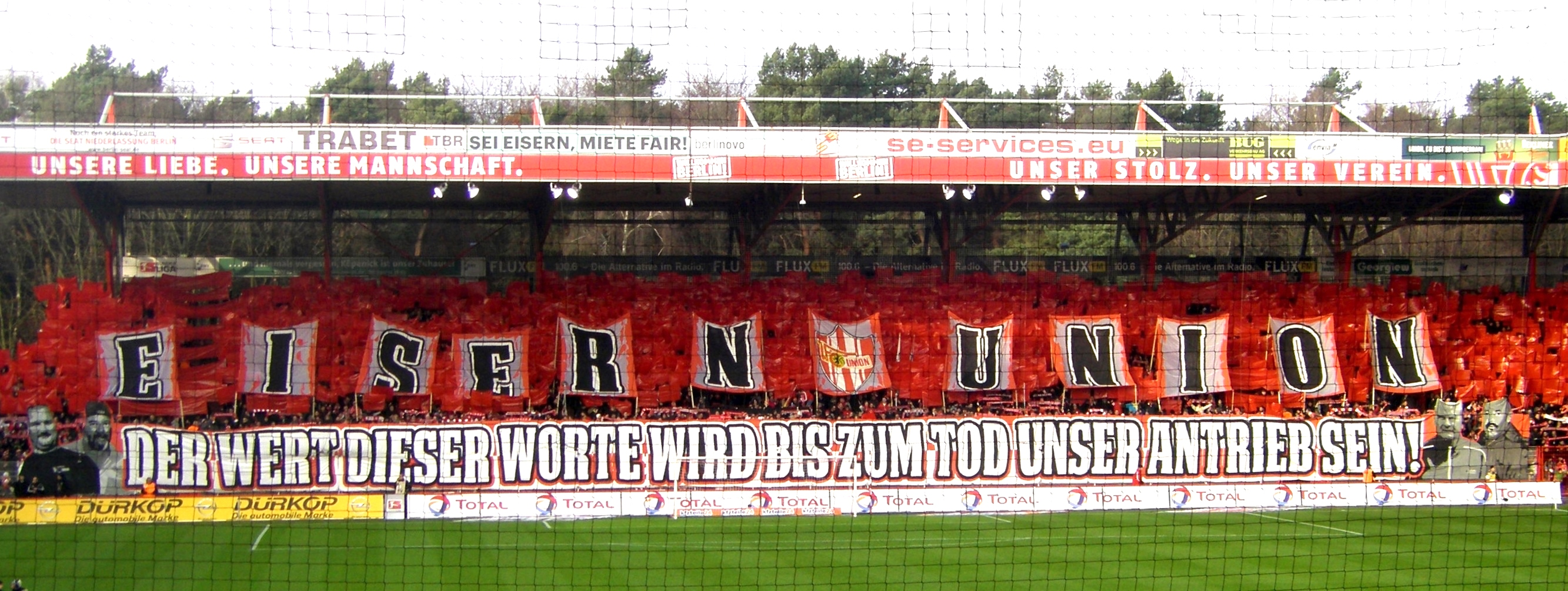
The supporters of the football club 1. FC Union Berlin are known for their chant "Eisern Union" (Iron Union).

Some chants are spoken, sometimes accompanied by percussion. These chants may simply consist of the name of the team and/or words of encouragement. The chants may also be in a call-and-response format. For example, Chile national football team fans will do a routine whereby one group of fans will chant "Chi-Chi-Chi", and another group will respond "Le-Le-Le". For the Indonesia national football team one group of fans will chant "In-Do-Ne-Sia" with an air horn and hand clap in response. "Garuda Di Dadaku" is sung by fans when Indonesia plays at home.

Popularised at the Sydney Olympics and used by Australian football supporters everywhere is the "Aussie Aussie Aussie, Oi Oi Oi" chant between two groups of supporters. It is a derivation of Welsh rugby chant "Oggy Oggy Oggy", which was also adapted by Chelsea supporters in tribute to Peter Osgood. A version "Zigger Zagger Oi Oi Oi" has been suggested to be based on a German toast "Zicke zacke zicke zacke hoi hoi hoi".

In the United States, despite a lower popularity of association football, "I believe that we will win!" and "U-S-A!" are generally chanted during matches US national teams are playing on the world stage. The chant "U-S-A!" has also been used outside of sports, such as in the halls of Congress during rallies of American support.

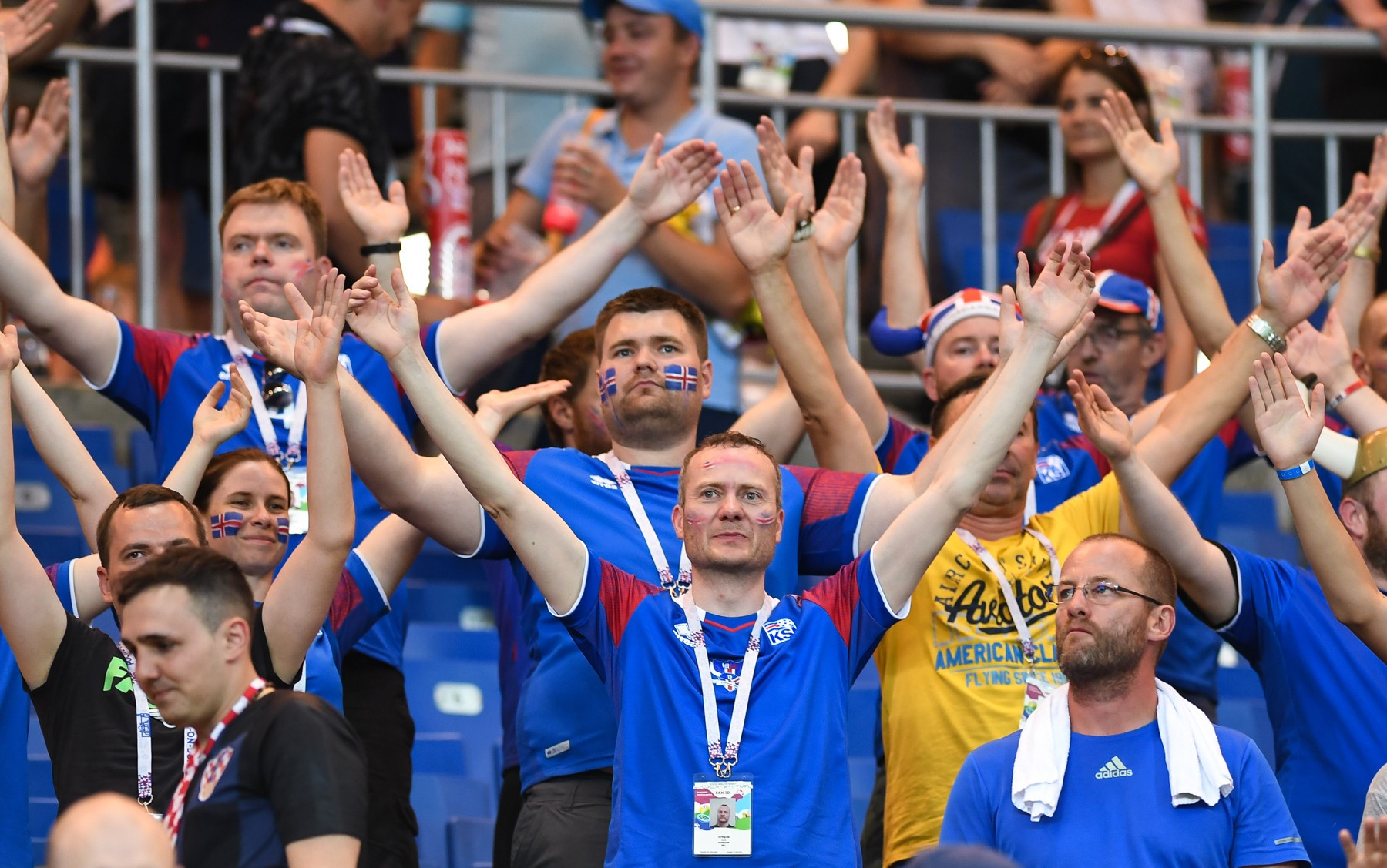
Iceland fans performing Viking Thunder Clap

Some chants consist simply of a loud shout or whoop with a hand clap, sometimes led by a drum beat that gets increasingly faster, such as the Viking Thunder Clap made popular by fans of Iceland. Similar chants have been performed by fans of teams such as Motherwell and Lens, and a version called "Boom Boom Clap" has been used by fans of North American clubs such as Seattle Sounders FC and Toronto FC since 2008 as well as the American national teams.

=== Fighting chants ===
"You're Gonna Get Your Fucking Head Kicked In", sometimes pluralised to "You're Gonna Get Your Fucking Heads Kicked In", is a football chant originating in England. It is also used as a case study in psychology and sociology. The chant is often used as an intimidatory chant towards the opposing fans rather than as an actual threat of violence, but there have been a number of occasions when it has led to a fight between fans. The chant is sometimes used after the opposition have scored. It is now considered to be a dated chant with little current usage in English football culture despite being in common use in the 1970s and 80s.

The chant "Come and Have a Go If You Think You're Hard Enough" was the inspiration for the title of a song by British-American experimental rock group the Mekons, on their 1998 album Me.

== Chants based on hymns and classical music ==
Several football chants are based on hymns, with "Cwm Rhondda" (also known as "Guide me, O thou great redeemer") being one of the most popular tunes to copy. Amongst others, it has spawned the song "You're not singing anymore!", "We support our local team!", and "I will never be a Blue!".

Various teams have used the "Glory Glory" chant (used by "Tottenham Hotspur", "Leeds United", "Manchester United", etc.), to the tune of the "Battle Hymn of the Republic" and "J'ai Perdu Le Do De Ma Clarinette". Hibernian were the first team to use the song with the release of a record by Hector Nicol in the 1950s ("Glory Glory to the Hibees").

"The Stars and Stripes Forever" is often sung with the words "Here we go, here we go, here we go!".

There have been various adaptations of "When The Saints Go Marching In" (e.g. by fans of Southampton and Tottenham Hotspur), and the tune of Handel's "Hallelujah chorus" as well as the tune of "In the Hall of the Mountain King" and "The Blue Danube".

Many football crowd chants/songs are to the tune of "La donna è mobile" from Giuseppe Verdi's opera Rigoletto, for example the chant by Derby County fans in honour of Fabrizio Ravanelli of "We've got Fabrizio, you've got fuck allio".

Italian tifosi employ various operatic arie, especially those by Giuseppe Verdi, for chants. For Parma's home matches at the Stadio Ennio Tardini, during the entry of the teams in the field, Aida's triumphal march resounds as Verdi is a symbol of the city.

Italian Torino fans sing their signature chant Toro alè to the tune of the national anthem of France, "La Marseillaise". The anthem theme was first popularized as a chant by A.S. Roma's curva sud after a 3-1 match win against Juventus on 30 January 1977. The anthem has also been modified by the RC Lens fans.

French PSG fans sing a rendition of "Flower of Scotland".

Arsenal fans have been singing "Good old Arsenal" to the tune of "Rule Britannia" since the 1970-71 season when they won the double.

Many Russian fans have been singing "Korobeiniki" since the 2018 FIFA World Cup.

There are many football chants whose lyrics are recomposed in Cantonese, and chanted by supporters of Guangzhou F.C., like When the Saints Go Marching In, and La Marseillaise, etc.

The chant "Why Are We Waiting?" is sung to the tune of "O Come, All Ye Faithful" in response to any delay.

== Chants based on spirituals and folk songs ==
Some chants are based on spirituals. "We shall not be moved" and "He's Got the Whole World in His Hands" are both used by fans. An example of the latter's use was "He's got a pineapple on his head" aimed at Jason Lee due to his distinctive hairstyle. The song was later popularised by the television show Fantasy Football League.

Christmas carols have also been used as chants like with the theme of "O Tannenbaum" by the likes of Manchester United or Chelsea fans.

The tune to the Shaker song "Simple Gifts" has spawned many terrace chants including "Carefree", a chant associated with Chelsea. It was also used for a Tottenham song abusing Sol Campbell after his move to Arsenal in 2001 and was sung by Manchester United fans, in honour of Park Ji-Sung. Chelsea fans also adapted the song "One Man Went To Mow" as an anthem.

"Sloop John B" has been popular amongst English football fans since the mid-2000s. It was adopted by the supporters of English non-league team F.C. United of Manchester as a club anthem in 2007.

The Geordie folk song "Blaydon Races" is associated with Newcastle United. Other folk songs to have their lyrics altered include "The John B. Sails" to "We Won it 5 Times" by Liverpool fans, "She'll Be Coming 'Round the Mountain" to "We'll Be Coming Down the Road" by the Scotland national team and Liverpool fans, "My Bonnie Lies over the Ocean", "The Wild Rover" (used for "We're by far the greatest team, the world has ever seen") and "Camptown Races", which is used for "Two World Wars, One World Cup", whilst Birmingham City fans sing "Keep Right on to the End of the Road".

The melody of "Bella ciao" is often used as a chant by Italian ultras groups of Salernitana, Cosenza Calcio, A.S. Livorno and also outside of Italy like with Aris Thessaloniki, AEK Athens F.C. or Paris Saint-Germain F.C. fans, as well as the Timbers Army of MLS' Portland Timbers. The song was also adapted by Brazilian fans during World Cup 2018 to tease and taunt Argentina about their possible exit in the first round, which eventually did not occur, with references to Argentinian players Di María, Mascherano, and Messi (Brazil and Argentina have a well-known football rivalry).

Italian tifosi are strongly used to sing mocks based on national, and internationally famous folk tunes, like "L'uva fogarina", "Oh! Susanna" and "Alouette".

"The Fields of Athenry" is a widely used anthem by Irish sports fans, sang particularly at rugby and football matches. The song was adopted and reworked by Liverpool fans as "The Fields of Anfield Road".

== Chants based on popular music ==
Popular music is the most common source of football chants. In the United Kingdom, music hall songs such as "My Old Man (Said Follow the Van)", "Knees Up Mother Brown", "I'm Forever Blowing Bubbles", "I Came, I Saw, I Conga'd" and "Two Little Boys" have long been used as the basis of terrace chants. Popular standards such as "Winter Wonderland", Scott Joplin's "The Entertainer", and the 1958 Eurovision entry "Volare" are also widely adapted to suit players and managers. The Cuban song "Guantanamera" became popularly used as a chant in the UK as a version by The Sandpipers charted soon after the 1966 World Cup; it is commonly sung in a large variety of chants, for example in the form of "There's only one [player's name]", or "You only sing when you're winning". The tune "Tom Hark" is often played at many stadiums following a goal by the home team and for chants such as "Thursday Nights, Channel 5", whilst "Que Sera, Sera (Whatever Will Be, Will Be)" by Doris Day is generally reserved for matches where the venue of the final is Wembley Stadium.

The rhythm, rather than the melody, of "Let's Go (Pony)" by the Routers is widely used for clapping, drumming or banging by fans worldwide.

Music of the 1960s influenced terrace chants. "Ring of Fire" by Johnny Cash and "That's Amore" by Dean Martin have been used by several sets of fans. "Lola" by the Kinks, and "Hi Ho Silver Lining" by Jeff Beck have been adapted by several clubs – most prolific of these include Aston Villa, Sheffield Wednesday and Wolverhampton Wanderers. "All You Need Is Love", "Hey Jude" and "Yellow Submarine" by the Beatles are often used. Songs from musicals have become very popular as football chants, such as "Chim Chim Cher-ee" from the 1964 musical Mary Poppins. Some early songs became popular as football chants later, for example the Venezuelan song "Moliendo Café" popular in early 1960s first became used as a chant in Argentina in the late 1970s, which spread to Italy as "Dale Cavese" chants in 2006 and then later to clubs around the world.

The emergence of funk and disco in the 1970s also made its mark on the terraces with songs such as "Go West" by the Village People and "Oops Up Side Your Head" by The Gap Band remaining popular amongst fans. "Ain't Nobody" by Rufus and Chaka Khan has been used by Arsenal fans and others. Music popular in the 1980s and 1990s is also used widely. Chants have been based on "Just Can't Get Enough" by Depeche Mode, "Love Will Tear Us Apart" by Joy Division, "Pop Goes the World" by Men Without Hats, the Band Aid song "Do They Know It's Christmas?", "Papa's Got a Brand New Pigbag" by Pigbag and "This Is How It Feels" by Inspiral Carpets. Other chants have used tunes from on pop songs include "Three Lions", the official England anthem for Euro '96 and Manic Street Preachers song "If You Tolerate This Your Children Will Be Next".

Fans of a number of different clubs in the United Kingdom have adopted "Rockin' All Over the World" by Status Quo as a chant. Liverpool fans sing "Scousers all over the world". Arsenal fans sing "Saka and Emile Smith Rowe". Rangers fans sing "Gerrard stopped ten in a row", in reference to the club winning the 2020-21 Scottish Premiership under manager Steven Gerrard and breaking bitter rivals Celtic's nine-year monopoly on the title.

Fans in England sing "Leeds are falling apart again" to the tune of "Love Will Tear Us Apart" by Joy Division to mock fans of Leeds United.

More recent releases to have their music appropriated include "Seven Nation Army" by the White Stripes, which became highly popular across nations. A number of songs became popular in the 2010s, an example being "Freed from Desire", which is used to celebrate particular players – it was first popularised as "Will Grigg's on Fire", then used for others such as "Vardy's on Fire" and "Grizi's on Fire". An Italian disco song "L'estate sta finendo" became popular among European clubs such as Napoli, Juventus, Porto, Atlético Madrid and others as "Un giorno all'improvviso", later picked up Liverpool fans, who created their own version as "Allez Allez Allez" for their 2017–18 UEFA Champions League campaign, and it then spread to other British clubs in the 2018–2019 season. In late 2017, "September" by Earth, Wind & Fire had a big impact in English stadia. In 2022, fans of Tottenham Hotspur crafted a chant for Dejan Kulusevski to the tune of ABBA's "Gimme! Gimme! Gimme! (A Man After Midnight)".

== Chants based on nursery rhymes and theme tunes ==
Football crowds also adapt tunes such as nursery rhymes and theme tunes. "The Farmer in the Dell" known in some regions as 'The Farmer Wants A Wife', provides the famous chant of "Ee Aye Addio", a tune which also provides the first bars of the 1946 be-bop jazz classic "Now's The Time", by alto saxophonist Charlie Parker. The marching tune "When Johnny Comes Marching Home" is also used a basis for songs, such as "His Armband Said He Was a Red", sung by Liverpool fans in honour of Fernando Torres while he was still at the club. Chelsea fans then adapted the chant to match their own colours when Torres was transferred to the London club in 2011, with "He's now a Blue, he was a Red." Manchester United used the song to describe Torres and his looks too after he missed an open goal. United also used the song about John O'Shea after he scored a goal against Derby in the Carling Cup in 2009. The children's song "Ten Green Bottles" became "Ten German Bombers", to the tune of "She'll Be Coming 'Round the Mountain," both songs used by English fans to their main rivals, Germany. The nursery rhyme "This Old Man" is sung by both supporters of Manchester United and Manchester City. The "Theme from Z-Cars" has been used in Everton's Goodison Park ground since 1962.

Theme tunes which have been used as chants include Heartbeat and The Banana Splits.

== Club-specific songs ==
Some football teams also have songs which are traditionally sung by their fans. The song "You'll Never Walk Alone" from Carousel is associated heavily with Liverpool. In 1963, the song was covered by Liverpool group Gerry and the Pacemakers, which prompted the song's adoption by the Kop. At this time, supporters standing on the Spion Kop terrace at Anfield began singing popular chart songs of the day. The mood was captured on camera by a BBC Panorama camera crew in 1964. One year later, when Liverpool faced Leeds in the FA Cup final, the travelling Kop sang the same song and match commentator Kenneth Wolstenholme commended the "Liverpool signature tune". Other songs sung by Liverpool fans include "Poor Scouser Tommy" based on "Red River Valley".

Fans of West Ham United were said to have adopted the song "I'm Forever Blowing Bubbles" at Upton Park in the mid-1920s, although no record of West Ham fans singing the song existed until 1940.

"Marching on Together" is played and sung at Elland Road by supporters of Leeds United, and is one of the few club songs specifically written for the football club in question, being an original composition by Les Reed and Barry Mason. It was first released as the B-Side to Leeds United to coincide with the 1972 FA Cup Final.

Manchester City has been strongly associated with the classic popular song "Blue Moon" since the late 1980s. The song is now an established and official part of the club's brand and culture: 'Blue Moon' is also the name of the club's leading fansite, images of a blue moon (a moon that's blue in colour, not the astronomical phenomenon) appear on licensed and fan-made clothing and merchandise, and the team's mascots are a pair of blue aliens from the Moon named 'Moonchester' and 'Moonbeam'.

"Blue Is the Colour" is the song for Chelsea. The song was released in 1972 when the club reached the 1972 League Cup Final. Chelsea fans also sing the "celery" song, waving and hurling sticks of celery while singing, starting in the early 1980s.

"Go West" by the Village People has been co-opted by fans of Arsenal F.C., using the words "1-0 to the Arsenal" as a reference to the club's defensive style of football under former manager George Graham. The same "1-0 to the Arsenal" was also often sung, in ironic spirit, by fans of opposition by way of mocking their perceived boring style of play during this time.. The tune is also used by supporters of Leyton Orient with the words "Stand Up for The Orient."

"Goodnight, Irene" is sung by fans of Bristol Rovers, while "Drink Up Thy Zider" by The Wurzels is sung by Bristol City fans.

"No One Likes Us"
No one likes us, we don't care. Sung by Millwall supporters in the Cold Blow Lane stand.

"Sailing" (originally by the Sutherland Brothers, but most commonly associated with Rod Stewart) is adapted by a number of clubs. Chesterfield fans, sings the song usually whenever the Spireites look to be 'sailing' to victory. A much faster-tempo version of the melody is used by Millwall F.C. fans for their famous chant "No one likes us, we don't care". Tottenham fans sang the song as "We are Tottenham, from the Lane", and variations of the same chant are sung by fans of other clubs.

Birmingham City adopted "Keep Right on to the End of the Road" by Sir Harry Lauder after the team sang it on the coach before the 1956 FA Cup Final Versus Manchester City, it was heard by the fans outside Wembley Stadium . The song was a favourite of Alex Govan who introduced to his teammates, and their manager Arthur Turner used the song as a pre-match ritual in their FA Cup run. It has been the Blues Anthem ever since.

Supporters of Hibernian are known for singing "Sunshine on Leith" due to the song's composers and performers The Proclaimers being well known Hibernian supporters and the song's reference to Hibernian's home in Leith and as such the song has become an unofficial club anthem. The club has in the past also played other songs by the pair at its home ground Easter Road, such as "I'm on My Way", though none have the same association with the team that "Sunshine on Leith" does.

Fans of Tottenham Hotspur sing Barry Manilow's "Can't Smile Without You".

Brighton & Hove Albion play "Good Old Sussex by the Sea" before each home game at Falmer Stadium, a tradition continued from their time at the "Goldstone Ground."

Stoke City fans have sung "Delilah" by Tom Jones since the 1980s.

Supporters of Sheffield Wednesday regularly sing the words "Honolulu Wednesday" to the tune of "Honolulu Baby"; a song which featured in the 1933 film Sons of the Desert starring Laurel and Hardy. Across the city, Sheffield United F.C. fans celebrate the start of home games with a chorus of The Greasy Chip Butty Song.

Before every match, Nottingham Forest fans sing "Mull of Kintyre", replacing "Mull of Kintyre" with "City Ground", and "Mist rolling in from the sea" with "Mist rolling in from the Trent". "Mull of Kintyre" has also been adopted by Charlton Athletic, with Valley, Floyd Road and the Thames similarly being referenced.

"Men of Harlech" is sung in a few Welsh clubs such as Cardiff City and Wrexham but with different lyrics. Wrexham fans sing it as "Wrexham is the name".

"Can't Help Falling in Love" has been adopted originally by Sunderland as well as several other teams including Huddersfield Town, Hull City, Swindon Town, and Preston North End.

The Dave Clark Five's "Glad All Over" has been sung at Selhurst Park since 1968 by Crystal Palace fans after the band performed the song at the ground in February that year. It is also used by several clubs after a home goal is scored, including Swindon Town, Barrow and Port Vale.

Gateshead supporters sing "Trail of the Lonesome Pine" from the film Way Out West.

Sydney FC supporter group "The Cove" sing "Rhythm of My Heart" by Rod Stewart in the 23rd minute of every game as tribute to supporters who have died.

Feyenoord fans sing an adaption of Gloria Gaynor's "I Will Survive" after the team scores at De Kuip.

Dundee United fans have been known to sing Daniel Boone's single "Beautiful Sunday".

Coventry City former chairman and manager Jimmy Hill, adopted the "Eton Boating Song" as the club's official anthem to create Play up Sky blues in the early 1960s. The song has been sung on the terraces ever since and remains one of the most recognisable in English football.

Fans of Shamrock Rovers sing "Build Me Up Buttercup" by The Foundations.

== Country-specific songs and chants ==
Belgian and Tunisian fans chanting at the 2018 World Cup

"Vamos, vamos, Argentina" is a stadium anthem sung by Argentine fans in support of their national team. At the 2014 World Cup, "Brasil Decime Qué Se Siente" ("Brazil tell me how it feels"), sung to the tune of Creedence Clearwater Revival's "Bad Moon Rising" and first used by San Lorenzo fans, became a popular song chanted by Argentine fans directed at Brazil.

"Cielito Lindo" is a song popularly sung by Mexican fans as an unofficial national anthem. Brazilian songs popularly sung by the country's fans include "Eu Sou Brasileiro" ("I'm Brazilian"). Similarly Spanish fans may sing "Yo soy Español" ("I'm Spanish"), which is sung to the tune of "Kalinka" after they beat Russia in Euro 2008. Other songs Spanish fans may sing include "Y Viva España".

Songs commonly sung by fans of England national team include "Here We Go" (with "England" enunciated as a three-syllable "Eng-ger-land"), "Three Lions (Football's Coming Home)", theme from The Great Escape, and others. A few songs are directed against specific teams, such as "Ten German Bombers" usually sung at their matches against Germany. During UEFA Euro 2020 they began singing "Sweet Caroline" by Neil Diamond.

Fans of the Wales national team have adopted the song "Can't Take My Eyes Off You" by Frankie Valli as an anthem since 1993.

"Allez Les Bleus!" is used as an anthem to cheer on the France national team. French fans are also known for singing "la la la la la" to the tune of Gloria Gaynor's song "I Will Survive" since the 1998 World Cup won by France.

"Contigo Perú" is a famous song that is often sung by Peruvian football fans during their National Team's matches, even in the Russia 2018 World Cup match vs France. "Vamos" is also popular chants used by a number of Latin American countries. "Soy Celeste" ("I'm sky blue") has been used by the Uruguayans in reference to their national flag.

During the 2026 FIFA World Cup, Norway fans, Norway players and the Norway parliament performed the Viking row.

== Chant Laureate ==
On 11 May 2004, Jonny Hurst was chosen as England's first "Chant Laureate". Barclaycard set up the competition to choose a Chant Laureate, to be paid £10,000 to tour Premier League stadia and compose chants for the 2004–05 football season. The judging panel was chaired by the Poet Laureate Andrew Motion, who said "What we felt we were tapping into was a huge reservoir of folk poetry."

== Argentine fútbol chanting ==
Racing Club de Avellaneda fans chanting the famous "Mi Buen Amigo" (My good friend) chant before the start of a match.

Following the work of Pablo Alabarces and others, Eduardo Herrera suggests that football chanting in Argentina allows participants to create value around and give meaning to the idea of "aguante," which is "central in the construction of an ideal masculinity." "Aguante" translates to "endurance" or "stamina" in English. In practice, aguante is part of a masculine discourse that "divides the world between 'real men' and 'not men.' Garriga Zucal and Daniel Salerno have identified three main signs of aguante. The first is "alentar siempre," which means to show support for the team throughout the entire match by jumping or chanting, even through bad weather or poor performance by the team. Secondly, to show aguante, a man must show up to all the matches, including away games that require long, uncomfortable trips. Thirdly, a fan must withstand confrontation to demonstrate aguante, either through chanting at opposing fans or through physical fights.

Participating in chanting or cantitos is a major way the barras bravas, or the most important militant groups of fans, can demonstrate aguante. The barras bravas, who are also known as the hinchada militante, stand throughout the game behind the goal and chant the entire time. These groups bring instruments to the matches in order to synchronize the chanting. The most prominent instrument is the bombo con platillo, which is a large bass drum with a diameter of 22-24 inches. The bombos con platillo are often decorated with the team's colors and name and the name of the barra group, which is distinct from the team name. Along with these drums, other types of drums include Brazilian surdo drums, redoblantes (snare drums), and repiques. The barras often have other percussion instruments, including scrappers, tambourines, cowbells, and agogo bells. In addition to percussion, most barras have at least three trumpet players, and many teams might add trombones or euphoniums. While the bombo players are always from the barras bravas itself, because of the advanced skill it takes to play the brass instruments, the barras sometimes hire outside brass players to play during a match.

In the ensemble, one bombo player serves as the leader of the group, where he leads with exaggerated arm movements that are easy for the players to follow, but the leader of the chanting is often falls to another leader of the barras. They might lead by giving verbal or visual cues to the head bombo player, or they might just independently start a chant and expect the ensemble to follow.

== See also ==
- Cheering
- Entrance music
- Music at sporting events
- List of songs dedicated to association football
- List of UK hit singles by footballers
- Sea shanty
- Tomahawk Chop
