= Vamos (football chant) =

Spanish-language football chant from Peru

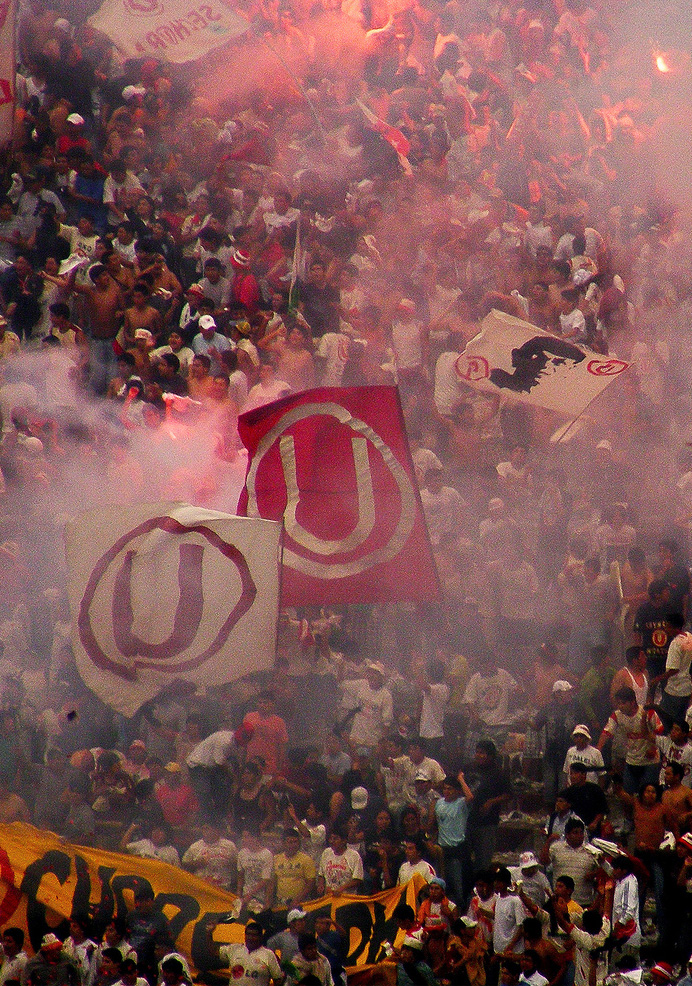
Peruvian football club Universitario's barra brava invented the Vamos chant

Vamos ('Let's go!'), also known as Esta Tarde ('This Afternoon') or Esta Noche ('Tonight'), is a Spanish-language football chant from Peru attributed to the Trinchera Norte (Northern Trench), the barra brava of Lima sports club Universitario de Deportes. Trinchera Norte invented the chant in the early 1990s to cheer Universitario; it has since been modified by supporters of other football clubs, such as Minnesota United FC, Orlando City SC, D.C. United, and Club Universidad de Chile, as well as by the fans of the national teams from Chile, Ecuador, and Peru.

The chant's melody is similar to the Portuguese-language cheer Eu Sou Brasileiro (I Am Brazilian), invented in 1949 by Brazilian teacher Nelson Biasoli.

== History ==
=== Universitario's barra brava ===
Peruvian club Universitario's organized football supporters, Trinchera Norte, created the Vamos chant in the early 1990s, originally naming the cheer as Esta Tarde. The chant has also been adapted by supporters of Peru's national team as ¡Vamos peruanos! (Let's go Peruvians!). During the qualification process for the Russia 2018 World Cup, Peruvians sang the chant alongside Argentines disgruntled by the performance of Argentina's national team at the La Bombonera stadium.

=== Vamos chilenos ===
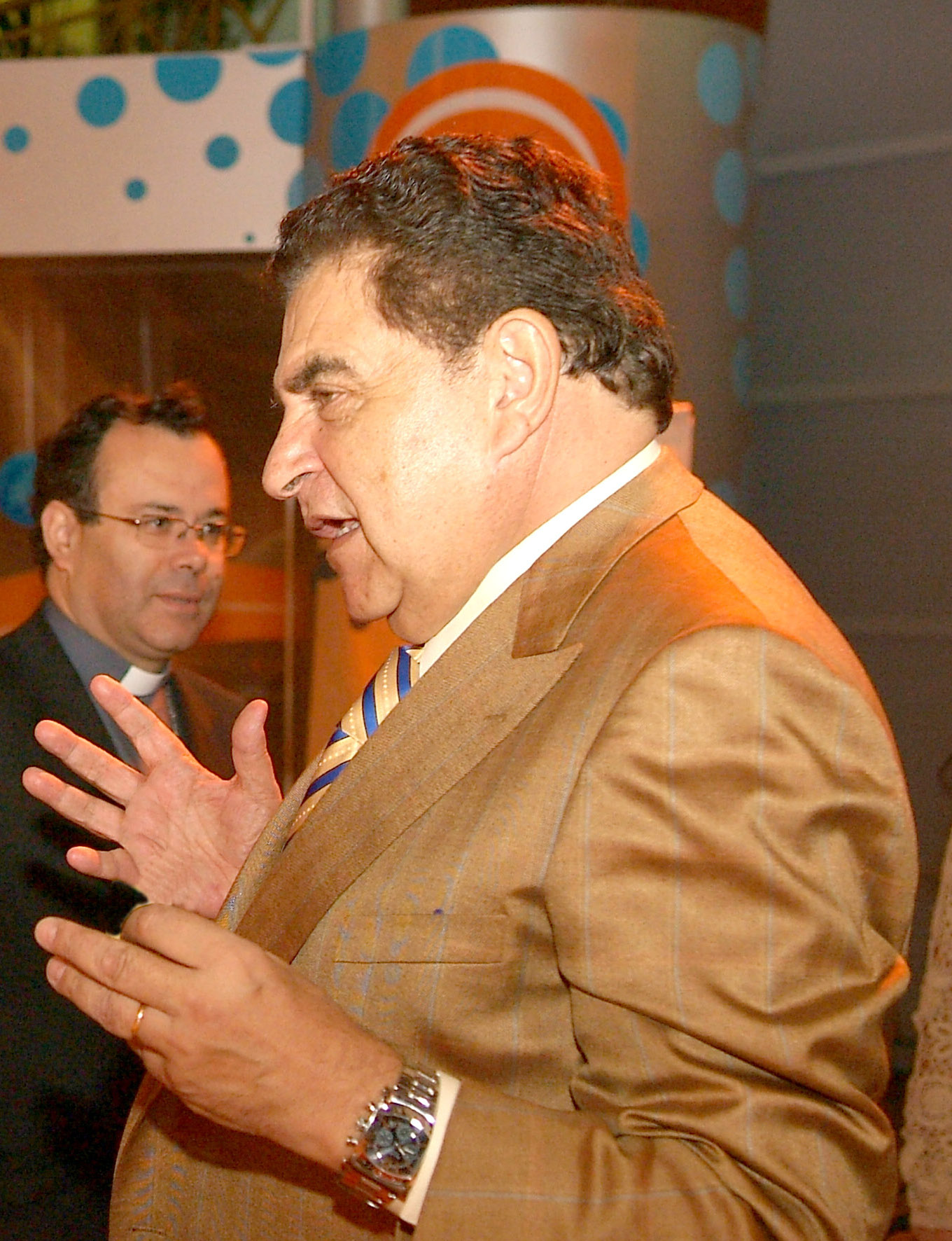
Don Francisco helped popularize Vamos in 1996

After listening to Universitario's fans singing the chant, the Chilean group Los de Abajo (The Ones From Below), the barra brava of Club Universidad de Chile, adapted the chant to cheer their football club. "John Connor," the pseudonym of a leader of Los de Abajo, stated to a reporter of the Santiago newspaper La Tercera that: "At the 'U' we began singing [the chant] in 1993, as it seemed to us to be a good tune. And thanks to us, not the Peruvians, it was popularized, because even then Los de Abajo were the biggest barra in the Pacific."

Vamos' popularity increased in Chile after Los de Abajo adapted the chant's lyrics to cheer Chile's national team in the qualification process for the France 1998 World Cup, renaming the chant as ¡Vamos chilenos! (Let's go Chileans!). During the 1996 Chilean telethon for children with developmental disabilities, held at that country's National Stadium, the Vamos chant reached even higher levels of popularity after host Don Francisco, aided by sports journalist Jorge Hevia, slightly changed the lyrics to encourage the fundraiser's completion—ever since then, Vamos is considered the unofficial anthem of Chile's Teletón.

In 2010, Keyvan Heydari, journalist for the American nonprofit National Public Radio, listed ¡Vamos chilenos! as representative of Chile's supporters and one of the "battle hymns" of the South Africa 2010 World Cup. Also in 2010, Chilean musician Rodrigo Medel registered a version of the chant with the Sociedad Chilena del Derecho de Autor (Chilean Copyright Society), but its inscription as a folk song prevents him from receiving royalties.

=== MLS fan anthems ===
Fans from football clubs from the North American Major League Soccer (MLS) have included the Vamos chant among others that they adapted from foreign leagues. Sports journalist Phil West, wrote for the MLS's official website that the Vancouver Southsiders, supporters of the Canadian football club Vancouver Whitecaps, adapted the Vamos chant from Chile's ¡Vamos chilenos!.

The Screaming Eagles and La Barra Brava, supporters of the American football club D.C. United, also modified the chant for their club, renaming it as Vamos DC United. The altered chant, sung in Spanish, is considered traditional by the club, which inscribed the phrase "Vamos United Esta Noche Tenemos Que Ganar" (Let's Go United Tonight We've Got To Win) on their 2015 jersey's neck tape. In 2012, Elliott Turner, football correspondent for British newspaper The Guardian, listed Vamos DC United among the five best "fanthems" from MLS, describing it as "simple yet powerful."

=== International football ===
Vamos has increased in popularity at international football matches beyond Peru and Chile. Since 2014, the supporters of Ecuador's national team chant a version of Vamos renamed as ¡Vamos ecuatorianos!. Also in 2014, the Ultras Malaya supporters of Malaysia's national team chant a version of Vamos under the name of Ayuh MalaysiaKu (Come on my Malaysia!). This chant also used by several supporters in Indonesia, as well as the Indonesia's TimNas.

== Lyrics ==
Original lyrics (in Spanish):

¡Ooh,
Universitario,
esta tarde
tenemos que ganar!

Modified lyrics (in Spanish):

¡Ooh!
¡Vamos, peruanos!
¡Que esta noche,
tenemos que ganar!

English translation:

Oh!
Let's go, Peruvians!
That tonight,
We've got to win the match!

== See also ==
- Football in Peru
- List of songs dedicated to association football
- Olé, Olé, Olé
- Vamos, vamos, Argentina
