= Jonny Hurst =

English chant laureate

Jonny Hurst (born 11 June 1966), originally from Solihull, Birmingham, latterly Wanstead, north London, is England's first (and to date only) Chant Laureate.

Barclaycard set up the competition to choose a Chant Laureate, who would be paid £10,000 to tour Premiership stadiums and compose football chants for the 2004–5 football season. The judging panel was chaired by the Poet Laureate, Andrew Motion, who said "What we felt we were tapping into was a huge reservoir of folk poetry." Ironically, Hurst, a Birmingham City fan, composed the winning entry about Birmingham's local rivals Aston Villa. The chant, sung to the tune of Barry Manilow's Copacabana, refers to that club's star player, Juan Pablo Ángel. Some 1,500 people applied for the role.

A veteran of the Edinburgh Festival Fringe and the Canal Cafe Theatre NewsRevue, Jonny Hurst is both a comedy writer and a lawyer.

He published his first book, 'Becoming a Lawyer', in July 2013.
