= The Stars and Stripes Forever =

1896 national march of the United States

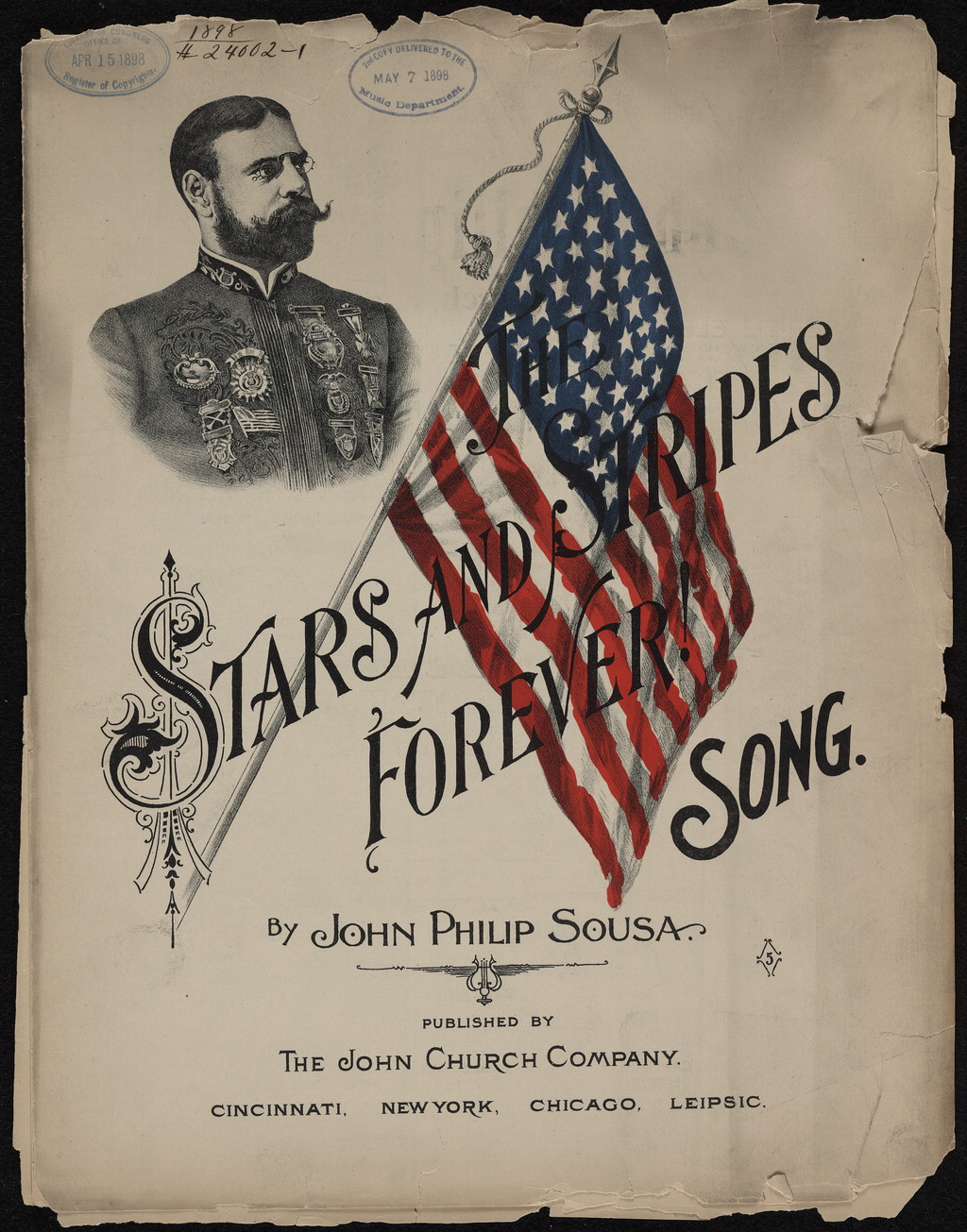
- National march of the United States
- Lyrics: John Philip Sousa, May 1897
- Music: John Philip Sousa, December 25, 1896; 129 years ago
- Published: 1897 by John Church Company
- Adopted: 1987; 39 years ago

Audio sample
- Performed by the United States Marine Band: file; help

"The Stars and Stripes Forever" is an American patriotic march written and composed by John Philip Sousa in 1896. Since 1987, by an act of the U.S. Congress, it is the official National March of the United States of America.

== History ==
In his 1928 autobiography, Marching Along, Sousa wrote that he composed the march on Christmas Day, 1896. Sousa was on board White Star Line's Teutonic on his way home from a vacation with his wife in Europe and had just learned of the recent death of David Blakely, the manager of the Sousa Band. He composed the march in his head and committed the notes to paper on arrival in the United States. It was first performed at the Philadelphia Academy of Music on May 14, 1897, and was immediately greeted with enthusiasm. Following an Act of Congress in 1987, it was officially adopted as the national march of the United States of America.

Historically, in show business and particularly in theater and the circus, this piece is called the "disaster march". In the early 20th century, when it was common for theaters and circuses to have house bands, this march was a traditional code signaling a life-threatening emergency. It subtly notified personnel of emergency situations and ideally allowed them to organize the audience's exit without causing the chaos and panic that an overt declaration might. Except for impending disaster, circus bands never played the tune under any circumstances. One example of its use was during the Hartford circus fire of July 6, 1944, where at least 168 people were killed.

== Music ==
"The Stars and Stripes Forever"
1909 Edison Records recording of Sousa's Band in the form: Introduction, first strain, second strain, trio, breakstrain, trio with obbligato, repeat of breakstrain, grandioso, da capo repeat of introduction, first strain, second strain, trio, breakstrain, and grandioso

"The Stars and Stripes Forever"
United States Marine Band, following the more traditional military march form

"The Stars and Stripes Forever"
The Stars and Stripes Forever for 1 Piano, 4 Hands. Arranged by American concert pianist Giorgi Latso, performed by The Latsos Piano Duo

"The Stars and Stripes Forever" follows the standard U.S. military march form—of repeated phrasing of different melodies performed in sections called strains: a Sousa legacy. Performances vary according to the arrangements of individual band directors or orchestrators, especially regarding tempo and the number and sequence of strains employed.

=== Analysis ===
The march begins with a four-bar introduction, following with the first strain, which is repeated; then the second strain, which is also repeated; and sometimes both are repeated again if (the band is) marching in parade (or the breakstrain may be interjected and repeated). Now follows the dominant woodwinds in the first run of the Trio strain which repeats, and later repeats again as the piccolos obligato. (Here, in some performances, Sousa's patriotic lyrics may be sung in a choral overlay.) Then follows the breakstrain, the final strain, and the breakstrain repeated. The final repeats of the Trio (the Grandioso) render the famous obligato of the piccolo players—joined to a subdued but prominent countermelody by the brass section, then bringing everything to a close with once-more repeats of the grand finale.

Sousa explained to the press that the three themes of the final trio were intended to represent the three regions of the United States. The broad melody, or main theme, portrays the North. The South is represented by the famous piccolo obligato, and the West by the bold countermelody of the trombones. The three come together in the climax, representing the Union itself.

=== Instrumentation ===
The march is written for a standard full American concert band. On the page for The Stars and Stripes Forever on the official United States Marine Band website, under The Complete Marches of John Philip Sousa, additional parts are written in at the bottom of the downloadable score. These parts are from Sousa's Encore Book, and are handwritten for "Drums & Bells" and harp.

== Lyrics ==
=== Sousa's lyrics ===
Sousa wrote the lyrics to the piece, although they are not as familiar as the music itself. A typical pairing of Sousa's lyrics with various sections of the march—here the First strain and the Grandioso strain—is noted in the colored bars.

First strain
Let martial note in triumph float
And liberty extend its mighty hand
A flag appears 'mid thunderous cheers,
The banner of the Western land.
The emblem of the brave and true
Its folds protect no tyrant crew;
The red and white and starry blue
Is freedom's shield and hope.

Let eagle shriek from lofty peak
The never-ending watchword of our land;
Let summer breeze waft through the trees
The echo of the chorus grand.
Sing out for liberty and light,
Sing out for freedom and the right.
Sing out for Union and its might,
O patriotic sons.

Second strain
𝄆 Other nations may deem their flags the best
And cheer them with fervid elation
But the flag of the North and South and West
Is the flag of flags, the flag of Freedom's nation. 𝄇

Trio
Hurrah for the flag of the free!
May it wave as our standard forever,
The gem of the land and the sea,
The banner of the right.
Let tyrants remember the day
When our fathers with mighty endeavor
Proclaimed as they marched to the fray
That by their might and by their right
It waves forever.

Grandioso
Hurrah for the flag of the free.
May it wave as our standard forever
The gem of the land and the sea,
The banner of the right.
Let tyrants remember the day
When our fathers with mighty endeavor
Proclaimed as they marched to the fray,
That by their might and by their right
It waves forever.

=== Tidmarsh's additional lyrics ===
In 1942 the John Church Company published a four-part choral version of the march with a piano arrangement by Elmer Arthur Tidmarsh. This arrangement has additional lyrics written by Tidmarsh for the Breakstrain section of the march.

=== Parody lyrics ===
There is a parody of the lyrics to "The Stars and Stripes Forever" that begins "Be kind to your web-footed friends". Its exact origin is unclear, but versions of it were being quoted as early as the 1930s on college campuses, and during the 1940s, where it was sung for entertainment by soldiers at the USO. Some newspapers of that time referred to it as the "Duck Song." In 1954, Charles Grean and Joan Javits composed "Crazy Mixed Up Song", using these lyrics along with the march's theme. It was made somewhat popular by Peter Lind Hayes & Mary Healy in that year. In the early 1960s, it reached a wider audience as a part of Mitch Miller's nationally syndicated sing-along show, Sing Along with Mitch. This version has perhaps the best known lyrics, which were used to end every show:

Be kind to your web-footed friends,
For a duck may be somebody's mother.
Be kind to your friends in the swamp,
Where the weather is very, very damp,
Now, you may think that this is the end,
Well, it is!

The last two lines were later used for the theme song of the 1985 television series The Berenstain Bears, but with the lyrics changed to:

You may think that this starts our show,
Well, it does!

Later versions of "Be kind to your web-footed friends" extended the lyrics of the second verse. One popular version goes like this:

Be kind to your web-footed friends
For that duck may be somebody's mother,
She lives in a nest in a swamp
Where the weather is always damp.

You may think that this is the end,
Well it is, but to prove we're all liars,
We're going to sing it again,
Only this time we'll sing a little higher.

And the song repeats itself ad infinitum, getting higher in tone each repeat until the singer is ready for the final as per Mitch Miller:

You may think that this is the end,
Well, it is!

"Well, you're right!" may be substituted for "Well, it is!".

Another version goes like this:

Be kind to your web-footed friends
For a duck may be somebody's mother,
Be kind to your friends in the camp,
Where the weather is always damp.

You may think that this is the end,
Well it's not, we are just teasing.
There's something that you need to know,
We're gonna sing it _______________, here we go.

The blank may be filled with appropriate adjectives like "low", "high", "silly", "fast", etc., until ready for the finale, when the singer may end with "Well, it is!" as did Mitch Miller.

=== Soccer chants ===
"Here We Go", the British soccer chant, consists of the words "here we go" continuously repeated to the tune of "The Stars and Stripes Forever". It was described by Auberon Waugh as the national anthem of the working classes. It was the basis of Everton F.C.'s official song for the 1984 FA Cup Final. The tune has been repurposed for many other, similarly repetitive, football chants.

== Variations and notable uses ==
"The Stars and Stripes Forever" is featured in many U.S. musical performances and instances of pop culture:

- There are several orchestral transcriptions of "The Stars and Stripes Forever", including one by conductor Leopold Stokowski and one by Keith Brion and Loras Schissel. There was also an orchestral arrangement of the march by Carl Davis and David Cullen for the album Carl Conducts...Classical Festival Favourites. Orchestral versions are typically transposed one-half step lower than the original band version, to put the march in a key that is more familiar to string players.
- The tune is widely used by soccer fans, with the trio/grandioso section sung with the words "Here We Go". The supporters of Spanish association football team Valencia CF used to sing it with the words "Xe que bó!" which means something like "Oh! How good" in Valencian, and those words have become a symbol for the team. Another version uses the word cheerio repeatedly, normally sung to players or coaches when they have been sent off or occasionally when an underdog has ended its opponent's cup campaign. Finally, certain clubs such as Forest Green or Sunderland use the chant just using the club name; this only works if the name has three syllables. A nickname can instead be used for the chant, such as Gateshead fans chanting "Tynesiders".
- In the 1933 film Duck Soup, Harpo Marx, playing Pinky, a spy infiltrating a house in the middle of the night, attempts to open what he believes to be a safe, but turns out to be a large radio, which loudly begins playing "The Stars and Stripes Forever" when he turns the knob. Pinky spends the next several moments futilely (and loudly) trying to quell the noise before throwing the radio out a nearby window.
- The march was used in the 1939 cartoon Officer Duck, after Donald Duck successfully subdues Tiny Tom, played by Pete. It is played by a marching band of police officers who further advance Tom's arrest. On the highest note of the brass, Donald kicks Tom on his rear end.
- Classic Popeye the Sailor cartoons by Fleischer Studios make frequent use of the tune in the music score accompanying the climactic fight between Popeye and the villain starting with the moment Popeye gets a spinach power boost.
- Parts of the tune feature in two Laurel and Hardy short films, The Chimp and Come Clean.
- In show business, particularly theater and the circus, this piece is called "the Disaster March". It is a traditional code signaling a life-threatening emergency. This helps theater personnel to handle events and organize the audience's exit without panic. Circus bands never play it under any other circumstances. One memorable example of its use was at the Hartford circus fire in July 1944, in which at least 160 people were killed.
- A 1952 biographical film, Stars and Stripes Forever, gives an account of the composer's life and music.
- Russian-American pianist Vladimir Horowitz wrote a famous transcription of "The Stars and Stripes Forever" for solo piano to celebrate his becoming an American citizen. In an interview, Horowitz opined that the march, being a military march, is meant to be played at a walking tempo. He complained that many conductors played the piece too fast, resulting in music that is "hackneyed".
- Timmy Mallett was fond of chanting "Wacaday, Wacaday, Wacaday" to the tune in children's TV show Wacaday, often getting child guests to do the same.
- In "Evolution", the first episode of the third season of the television series Star Trek: The Next Generation, a malfunction in the ship's systems causes the main computer to play Sousa's march on all channels throughout the ship. The episode was first aired on September 25, 1989.
- The song is usually played for the President of the United States after he gives a speech at a public forum, event, or ceremony, whereas "Hail to the Chief" is played when the President is introduced.
- John Twomey performed "The Stars and Stripes Forever" by noisily squeezing air through his hands on an episode of NBC's The Tonight Show Starring Johnny Carson
- Played repeatedly in a 1962 episode of The Andy Griffth Show entitled The Mayberry Band, in which musical ineptitude becomes the motivation for deceit.
- Played at the end of the 1970 film adaptation of Catch-22 by a marching band accompanying Yossarian's desertion to the sea in an inflatable boat which he has launched from a suitcase.
- The tune of the song appears in the 1970 animated TV special adaptation of Horton Hears a Who! by Dr. Seuss, used as the melody for the song Be Kind To Your Small Person Friends.
- In 1981, fingerstyle guitarist Guy Van Duser made an arrangement of the march for guitar. It was later performed by guitarists such as Chet Atkins, Rick Foster and Doug Smith.
- The march was used during the Opening Ceremonies of the 1984, 1996 and 2002 Olympics, all hosted by the United States of America: while in 1984 was immediately played after the USA Olympic Team was introduced at the Los Angeles Memorial Coliseum, both in 1996 and 2002 the tune was played after John Williams Olympic Fanfare (that "introduced" Team USA at the former Centennial Olympic Stadium and six years later at Rice-Eccles Olympic Stadium).
- The march was adapted for the theme song to The Berenstain Bears 1985 cartoon.
- In MacPlay Monopoly, this song is used when the only player wins the game.
- Acoustix, the 1990 International Quartet Championship of SPEBSQSA (now Barbershop Harmony Society, or BHS), covers the song on their 1995 CD Stars & Stripes. This arrangement features new lyrics, but largely keeps Sousa's "Trio" lyrics.
- An 8-bit version of the song is used in the MS-DOS and Commodore 64 versions of Wheel of Fortune when solving a puzzle correctly.
- The student band Strindens Promenade Orchester in Trondheim, Norway, has the world record in "speed playing" of "The Stars and Stripes Forever" (absolutely all notes must be played). The band calls their speedy rendering of the march "Stars and Stribes", and performs the march at all solemn occasions at the Trondheim Student Society. Set during the fall term of 1999, the record time is 50.9 seconds (nominal time is 3 minutes 50 seconds). For this, the band is noted in the Norwegian edition of the Guinness Book of Records.
- The march in a specific rendition is in the soundtrack of the video game Postal 2, where it's performed by the marching band.
- American composer Robert W. Smith parodied Stars and Stripes Forever along with "Jingle Bells" with his composition "Jingle Bells Forever", published by Alfred Publishing Co.
- In 2008, the Muppets performed a web version starring Sam the Eagle, Beaker, a clucking chicken, Bobo the Bear, The Swedish Chef, and Crazy Harry.
- The video game Fallout 3 has the Stars and Stripes Forever as one of the songs on the Enclave Radio.
- In 2009, Fetch! with Ruff Ruffman used this tune as a jingle in advertising character Ruff Ruffman's "RuffMeal" in the episode "The RuffMeal Needs More Roughage".
- At the conclusion of WWE's Extreme Rules pay-per-view in 2011, Stars and Stripes Forever played following John Cena announcing the death of Osama Bin Laden. It was also played during the January 5, 2015 episode of WWE Raw from Corpus Christi, Texas, also involving Cena, during the main event segment called John Cena Appreciation Night, where The Authority (Triple H and Stephanie McMahon) thanked Cena for (kayfabe) re-hiring them following the previous year's Survivor Series event's main event match, only to slander him and then (kayfabe) fire his teammates from that night, Dolph Ziggler, Ryback and Erick Rowan. The Big Show, who was also Cena's teammate during the aforementioned match, was not fired since he turned his back on Cena during the match and then joined The Authority. Balloons and confetti then fell from the rafters as Cena and his teammates stood in the ring, dejected, as the song played.
- In Argentina, a sensationalist news channel, Crónica TV, always uses the first 22 seconds of this march as a background music on reporting breaking news stories.
- The Grateful Dead finished their 50th reunion concert on July 4, 2015 with fireworks accompanied by a recording of "The Stars and Stripes Forever", in front of 70,000 people in Soldier Field in Chicago.
- In 2022, a March Madness–themed commercial from Capital One featured the opening notes of "The Stars and Stripes Forever" being played by a marching band led by Charles Barkley, who claimed to represent a fictional university named "Chuck U". Samuel L. Jackson and Spike Lee are also featured in the commercial.
- The WWE Wrestlers Chad Gable and Ludwig Kaiser, playing "El Grande Americano" gimmick (a living legend of lucha libre), have a customized version of the song
- The Boston Pops Orchestra is well known for playing "The Stars and Stripes Forever", especially as an encore.
- In June 2026, CBS News included the song in its list of the 250 essential American songs of the past 250 years.

== See also ==
- List of best-selling sheet music
- List of marches by John Philip Sousa
- "You're a Grand Old Flag"
