= Thursday Nights, Channel 5 =

English football chant

"Thursday Nights, Channel 5" is an English football chant to the tune of "Tom Hark". It is mainly sung to antagonise supporters of the other team for playing in or dropping into the UEFA Europa League which, until 2012, was carried domestically on Channel 5, with the prime league slot on Thursday evenings.

== History ==
Channel 5 first gained the rights to show UEFA Cup matches in 2008, to commence from 2009 to 2010 (when the competition was rebranded the Europa League) for three seasons. Since then, the chant developed and is used to insinuate that the team it is aimed at is playing in a less prestigious competition to the UEFA Champions League. In 2012, Channel 5 did not renew the rights deal to show the Europa League, which then went to ESPN (now owned by BT Sport) and ITV4 from the 2012–13 season.

== Usage ==
The chant has been directed at clubs such as Liverpool and Tottenham Hotspur for playing in the Europa League instead of the Champions League.

Before a Europa League match between Fulham and Odense, Football on 5 presenters Jim Rosenthal and Stan Collymore were broadcast singing the chant during a highlights montage. Until then, the chant was perceived as having negative connotations towards Channel 5.

In 2011, Chelsea defender Ashley Cole shouted "Thursday night, Channel 5" at Manchester City players after Manchester City were knocked out of the Champions League, which almost provoked a fight in the Stamford Bridge tunnel.

== Response ==
The chant has also been considered an insult to opposing fans. Manchester United player Patrice Evra was said to be embarrassed by the chant's statement of Manchester United playing in the 2011–12 UEFA Europa League.
