= Here We Go (football chant) =

Association football chant

The section of Sousa's "The Stars and Stripes Forever" that forms the tune of the chant

"Here We Go" is the archetypal British football chant, composed of the words "here we go" sung over and over again to the tune of John Philip Sousa's "The Stars and Stripes Forever". Used at the time of the miners' strike as a rallying call, the song is often interpreted to precede a battle of some kind – in popular thought it is the chant of an aggressive football firm or gang; yet, unlike many football chants, it contains no explicitly offensive lyrics and is known widely. It was described by Auberon Waugh as the national anthem of the working classes.

== Variations ==
The same segment of Sousa tune is sometimes employed for club-specific football chants (for example Plymouth Argyle supporters regularly sing "Ar-guy-ull, ar-guy-ull, ar-guy-ull") and as a vehicle for exhortations to the players (a team that has scored three goals might be encouraged to "give us four" etc.), an impromptu observation on the on-field action ("send him off") or a taunt ("you're no good"). The supporters of Nottingham Forest used the melody with the words "Bri-an Clough" in honour of the then manager Brian Clough before the kick-off of each match. The singing would only stop once Clough had acknowledged the chant with a wave.

The song tune is also used simply for football club names, usually with three syllable names, such as Liverpool, Arsenal and Cliftonville.

The chant is used to mock the opposition, with fans chanting "cheerio" (telling them goodbye sarcastically) towards the opposition fans as they leave the ground early, due to seeing their team being well-beaten and being frustrated with their team.

The supporters of Valencia CF used to sing the melody with the words "Xe que bó!" which means something like "Oh! How good" in Valencian.

== Recordings ==
A version of the song was recorded by Hoagy & The Terrace Choir in 1984, arranged by Harold Spiro, and released on State Records.

The melody was also used by Manchester City and Sunderland fans for the chant "Niall Quinn's Disco Pants", in tribute to the Irish centre forward. The song was released as a single in April 1999, reaching no. 56 in the UK Singles Chart.

The chant formed the title and a great deal of the lyrics for Everton's FA Cup final single "Here We Go!" in 1985.
