= Strindens Promenade Orchester =

Norwegian student orchestra

Strindens Promenade Orchester is a student wind band in Trondheim, Norway. It holds the world record in "speed playing" of John Philip Sousa's famous marching song Stars and Stripes Forever. The band calls their speedy rendering of the march Stars and Stribes, and performs the march at meetings at the Trondheim Student Society. Set during the fall term of 1999, the record time is 50.9 seconds (nominal time is 3 minutes 50 seconds). For this, the band is noted in the Norwegian edition of the Guinness Book of Records.

The orchestra was founded at Havstein cemetery at 5:04 p.m., April 28th, 1963. This site was chosen because the founders thought that "it was the only place where nobody would be disturbed". The orchestra celebrates this event twice a year.
