= Grand Jojo =

Belgian singer-songwriter (1936–2021)

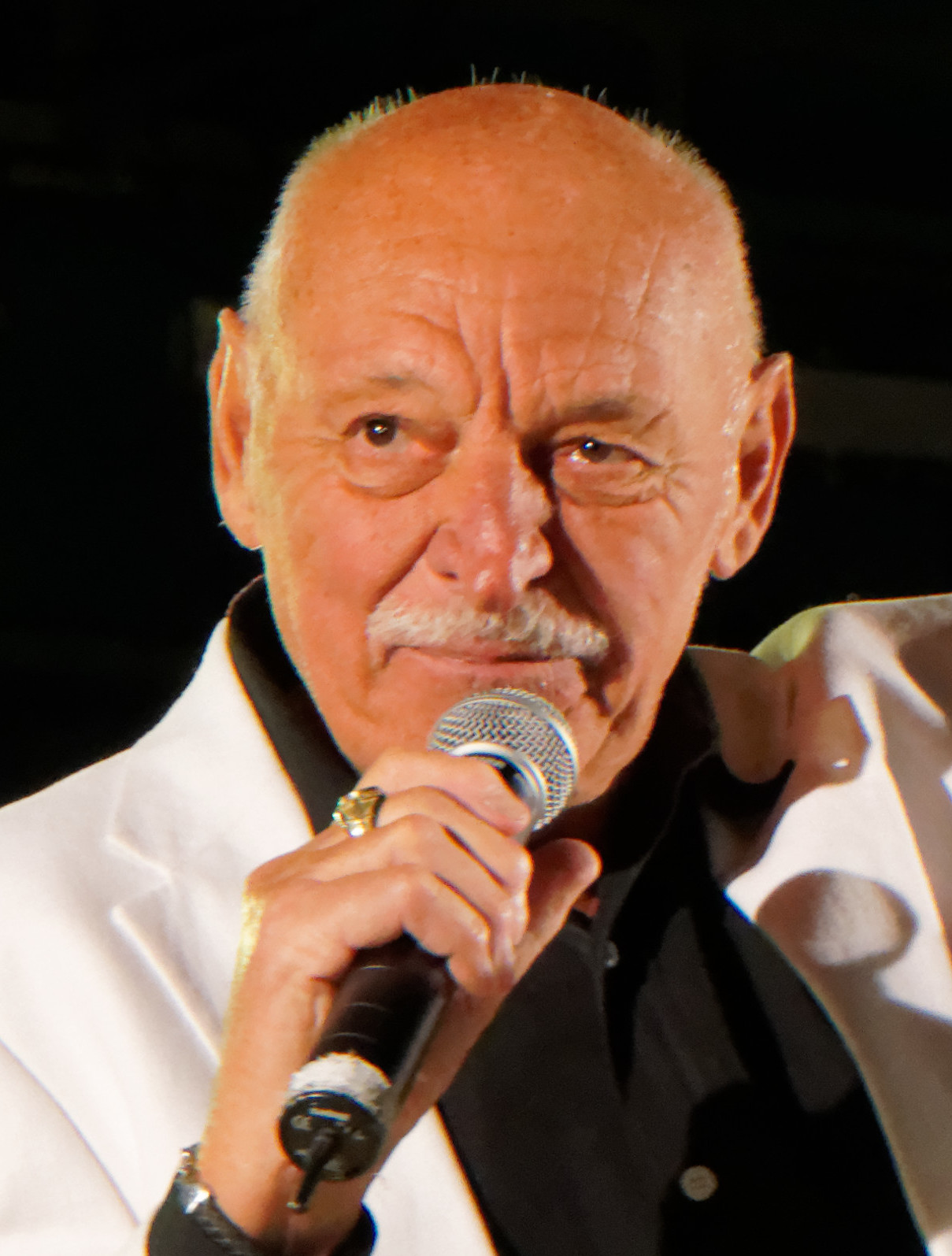
- Grand Jojo in 2014

Background information
- Also known as: Lange Jojo
- Born: Jules Jean Vanobbergen; 6 July 1936; Ixelles, Brussels-Capital Region, Belgium
- Died: 1 December 2021 (aged 85) Groot-Bijgaarden, Flanders, Belgium
- Genres: Schlager, Levenslied

Jules Jean Vanobbergen (6 July 1936 – 1 December 2021) was a Belgian singer-songwriter better known as Grand Jojo in French and Lange Jojo in Dutch. Grand Jojo is best known as the co-writer of "Anderlecht Champions (Allez, Allez, Allez)", which later became "Olé, Olé, Olé", and "Chef, un p'tit verre, on a soif" (Barman, a little drink, we are thirsty).

== Early life ==
Vanobbergen was born on 6 July 1936 in Ixelles. He enrolled in the Académie Royale des Beaux-Arts, because he wanted to become a painter. At the academy he received the nickname Grand Jojo/Lange Jojo. After graduating, he first worked as a marketing draughtsman then as a cartoonist.

== Career ==
While he was working in a record store, he realized that the market, at the time, lacked festive songs. Therefore, he decided to write his own songs under the alias Grand Jojo. Initially, his songs were only released in French, however, being bilingual, he always recorded a Dutch version as well.

Grand Jojo was a Belgian icon who represented his country by displaying the typical Belgian identity often based on self-mockery and referred to as belgitude (French; lit. 'Belgianness').

Grand Jojo mainly performed drinking songs such as "Chef, un p'tit verre, on a soif", "Sergent Flagada", "La petite bête à bon Dieu", and "Jules César". For his debut performances, he chose surrealistic tango songs such as "Le Tango du Congo", "Victor le footbaliste" and "Sitting Bull".

In 1985, as R.S.C. Anderlecht won its third consecutive title in the Belgian First Division A, he released a single called "Anderlecht champion" and then decided to adapt the lyrics in "E viva Mexico", a song he published for the 1986 FIFA World Cup where the Belgium national football team made it to the semifinals.

Hans Kusters Music commissioned Grand Jojo and Roland Verlooven to write a song in honour of the victory of R.S.C. Anderlecht which was easy to sing along to. The song "We are the Champions (Allez, Allez, Allez)" later became corrupted as "Olé, Olé, Olé".

His 1979 single "Chef, un p'tit verre, on a soif" was notably used by the presumed killer of Grégory Villemin, a four-year-old who was kidnapped and killed in France in 1984. Three years before the kidnapping, the main suspect in that case, called "corbeau" (meaning raven), had harassed Grégory's parents on the phone by playing the song every time he called.

== Later life ==
In 2006 (in Francopholies de Spa, a music festival in Belgium), Grand Jojo made a come back and joined the stage with ska punk bands such as Skaïra, as well as Poulycroc, who for the occasion released an album paying tribute to Grand Jojo. A Grand Jojo tribute concert took place in Louvain-la-Neuve on 7 September 2007, after an invitation from the régional athois and the CESEC—a student organization in economic, social and political sciences—during a celebration of their 30th anniversary.

In 2011, Grand Jojo returned to Universal Music Belgium. In December 2013, Grand Jojo performed at the Cirque Royal in March and at Forest National. Grand Jojo announced his retirement on 29 June 2021. Vanobbergen died on 1 December 2021 at the age of 85.

== Awards and legacy ==
On 11 May, 1998, Vanobbergen was knighted in the Order of Leopold. Grand Jojo was made an honorary citizen of Brussels in 2015. Manneken Pis wore a Jules César costume in his honour at the award ceremony. That same year he was awarded the Silver Medal of the National Order of the Golden Fry Cone as recognition of being the sponsor of "Week of the Fry 2015". In 2016 he was made an honorary citizen of the Marolles.

Grand Jojo published his autobiography Tout va très bien in October 2015. In 2019, Grand Jojo officially inaugurated his own museum at Boussu-lez-Walcourt with his friends Frédéric François and Claude Barzotti.

== Select discography ==
- 1977 Le Grand Jojo et Cie
- 1982 Jules César
- 1982 Animation
- 1984 Vive les Saints!
- 1984 Pour la danse, c'est super!
- 1984 Dansez avec Agadou, La chenille et La danse des canards
- 1984 C'est super
- 1984 Il fait chaud
- 1985 Hits n °1985
- 1986 Noces et banquets
- 1986 Agadou
- 1987 Dansez avec la chenille et la danse des canards
- before 1988 Z'n beste... (in Dutch)
- before 1988 Faites la fete
- before 1988 Plein tube
- 1988 Super bastringue
- 1988 Viens boire un p'tit coup à la maison
- 1989 On a soif
- 2012 Grand best of
- 2013 De beste (in Dutch)
- 2013 Double rest of
- 2013 Tournée Général !
- 2014 Back to back with André van Duin (in Dutch)
- 2015 Tout va très bien
- 2016 Collection
