= Olé =

Spanish interjection used to cheer on or praise a performance

¡Ole! or ¡olé! is a Spanish interjection used to cheer on or praise a performance, especially associated with the audience of bullfighting and flamenco dance. The word is also commonly used in many other contexts in Spain, and has become a stereotypical word used for the country; therefore it is often used outside Spain in cultural representation of the Spanish people.

== Etymology ==
The origin of the word olé is uncertain. A popular idea is that the word comes from Allāh, the Arabic word for God, perhaps as wa Ilâh (by God), or yāllāh (O God), which became Hispanicized into olé meaning "bravo!" and used to express an appreciation of an outstanding performance in Spanish. The linguist Joan Coromines in his Diccionario crítico etimológico castellano e hispánico links olé to the Spanish word for "hello" hola and hala. Hola has also been proposed to have come from Arabic. However, the suggested derivations from Arabic of both olé and hola are disputed and they are described by the Spanish Arabist Federico Corriente as "falsos arabismos" (false Arabisms) in his work Diccionario de arabismos y voces afines en iberorromance. The Spanish dictionary Diccionario de la lengua española that stated the wa Ilâh origin of olé in its earlier editions has removed the claim since 2001.

The "Allah" origin hypothesis still has its supporters. Antonio Manuel Rodriguez Ramos, a historian with expertise on the history of Cordoba asserts that Ole means 'Allah' in a Flamenco performance. When a cante jondo singer says "Ole", he was proclaiming "Allah" in an exaltation of the sublime, but the meaning has been lost in time.

The word is also proposed to have originated from Greek ὀλολυγή (ololigi) to describe a "ritual cry". However, the word would be derived from a verb meaning "disastrous", with negative connotations and not used repeatedly as is the current practice, nor are there any records of it ever being used a in a similar fashion to express admiration or satisfaction in Greek the way it is currently used in Spanish. Another suggestion is that it came from the Biblical story of Jacob and the two sisters Leah and Rachel, where Jacob was deceived into marrying Leah and said "Oh, Leah" when her identity was revealed, which turned into ole.

The word ole may be pronounced with or without the accent on the "e"; it may be paroxytone (written as ole), though sometimes it can be oxytone (then written olé). The word is believed to have deep root in Andalusia and from there it spread to Madrid, and the acute accent in olé may be more proper in Andalusian and flamenco. In Andalusia, a number of words similar in meaning to olé are also used: ojú, ozú and arza.

== Use in flamenco ==
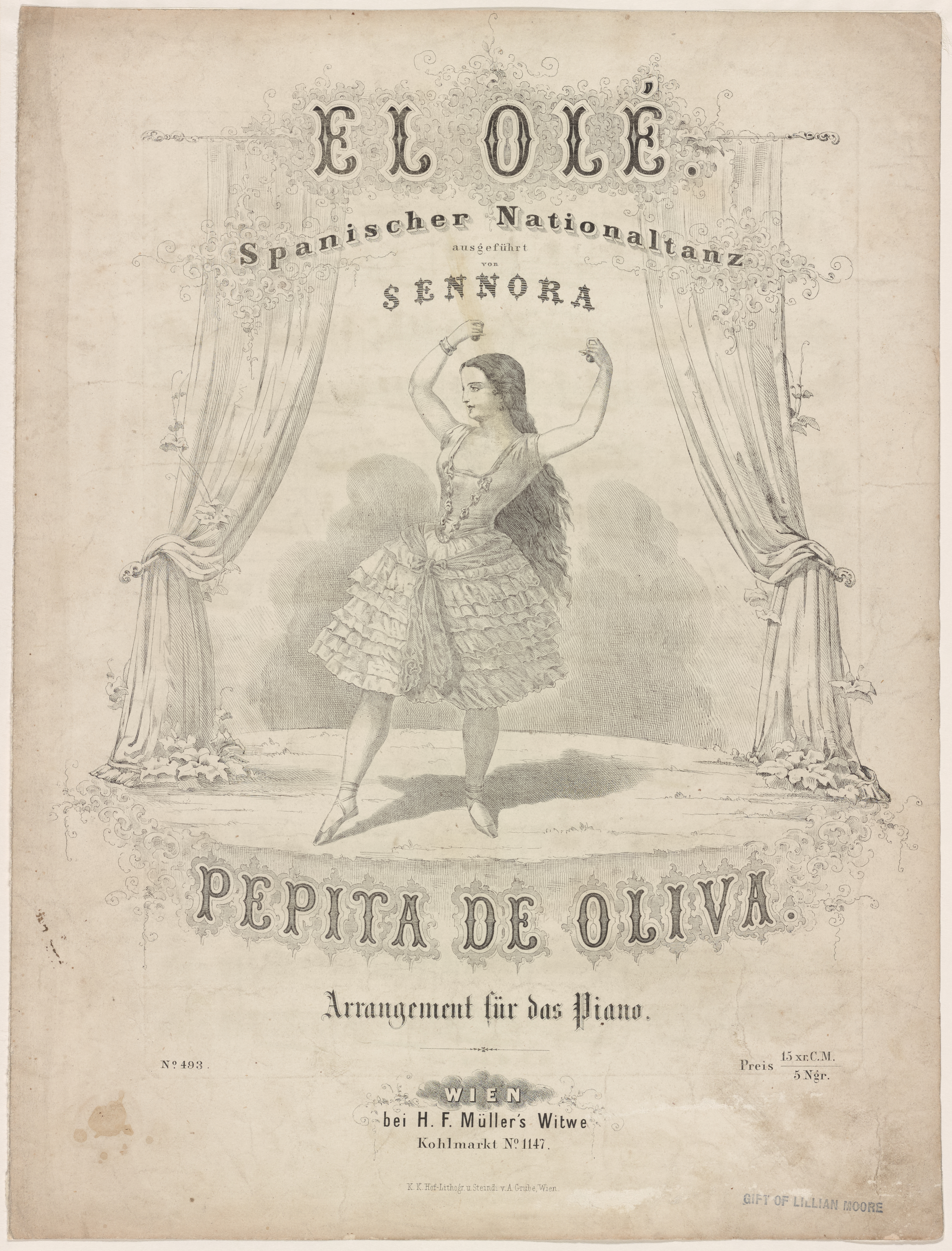
"El Olé, the Spanish national dance," with image of Pepita de Oliva. Sheet music, 1850s.

In flamenco music and dance, shouts of "olé" often accompany the dancer during the performance as encouragement or praise, and at the end of the performance. A singer in cante jondo may also emphasize the word "olé" with melismatic turns.

Some believed that "ole" originated when the audience exclaimed "Allah" because the presence and power of God could be glimpsed through an exceptional performance in a flamenco dance. It has also been argued that when Flamenco dancers chant the word in cante jondo, they were reciting the beginning of the Shahada ("la illaha illa Allah") and that they were performing a Muwashshah.

== Use in sport ==
=== Bullfighting ===
In bullfighting, "olé" is commonly shouted spontaneously by the crowds as a cry of approval in response to a matador's performance. The spectators may cheer on a series of moves (such as chicuelinas and derechazos) performed by the bullfighter, with each move greeted with an "olé". The crowd may lengthen the vowels into "Ooooooleeeee" when a bull follows the cape of the matador.

=== Football ===
The word Olé has also become associated with other sports since the 20th century. In association football, "Olé" as an interjection as used in bullfighting is believed to be first used in February 1958, in a friendly match between Brazilian club Botafogo and Argentine side River Plate in Estadio Olímpico Universitario in Mexico. The game ended in a 1-1 draw, but became known as the match where “Ole!” was chanted for Garrincha whenever he dribbled past his marker. The word may be chanted by a crowd for a team or player who made an exceptional performance, and it may be used to demean the opposition when their own team put on a dominant performance, or to mock when someone failed in an attempt to achieve their aim.

Since the 1980s, it is commonly used in football in the form of the "Olé, Olé, Olé" chant, which is sung to a tune rather than the series of isolated spoken exclamations as used in bullfighting. A similar form was heard in Spain in league game in 1982, and this version quickly spread to other clubs. This form was first sung in San Sebastián as "Campeones, hobe, hobe, hobe" (hobe means "the best" in Basque) when Real Sociedad won the 1982 La Liga title, but sung in other parts of Spain as "Oé, Oé, Oé", and in other European countries outside of Spain as "Ole, Ole, Ole".

The current popular version of the "Olé, Olé, Olé" chant, however, was first used in a Belgian song "Anderlecht Champion" initially as "Allez, Allez, Allez, Allez" in French, which morphed into the Spanish "Olé, Olé, Olé, Olé" in a version of the song used for the 1986 FIFA World Cup, hosted in Mexico. This version of the chant quickly spread and is now commonly used by fans in association football worldwide; for example, has been used by the supporters of the Republic of Ireland national football team. The chant is also used by fans of other sport, such as the hockey team Montreal Canadiens at the Bell Centre and the Welsh rugby union. This chant has also been used in non-sporting events around the world.

=== Tennis ===
The "Olé" chant can be heard during matches at the Roland-Garros tournament.
