= 1996 Chilean telethon =

Charity event

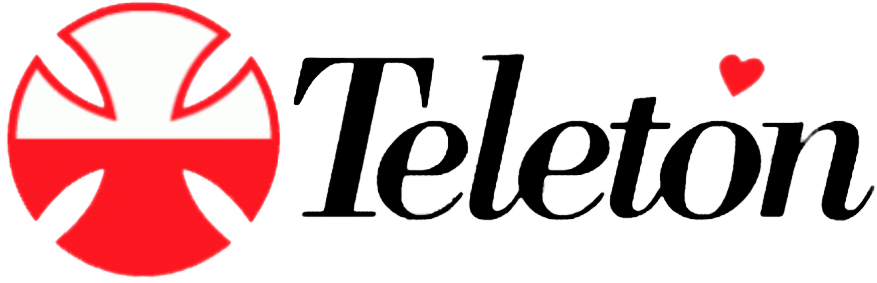
Chilean Telethon's logo

The 1996 Chilean telethon was the 14th version of the solidarity campaign conducted in Chile. It took place on 6 and 7 December 1996. The theme of this version was "Another step forward."

After the shortcomings of the previous year, mistakes were corrected and this time the goal was achieved - an important objective, as the following year (1997) the campaign would not be run because of Chilean parliamentary elections - and collected CL$5,692,426,301 (counting from 00:32 hours on December 8) delivered at the National Stadium of Chile. The poster girl on that occasion was Nicole Núñez.

This edition was famous for the slogan "Identify with the Telethon", which was also the name of the official theme song of this edition sung by Don Francisco and a group of local singers. For reasons still unclear, this song was never released as a single.

== The build-up ==
After the perceived failure of the previous Telethon, this was a time of change for the campaign, starting with a change of logo, dropping the classic typeface from 1978. Also, during the preceding campaign, television programmes had on their sets a board saying "(Name of the program) identifies with Telethon", and on the back the guests stamped their fingerprint and signature, confirming their commitment to the campaign.

The fundraising target was simply to exceed the amount raised in the previous year, i.e. $5,534,774,829.

== The event ==
As usual, the event began at the Teatro Teletón with some moving words from Mario Kreutzberger, in which he spoke about the campaign and then sang the Telethon theme with a children's choir. The first section featured artists such as Ricardo Montaner, Illapu, Dinamita Show and Alberto Plaza. In addition Ciclodance were introduced; they had appeared on the show since 1990. The first section concluded with a summary of the previous season's campaign.

In the small hours there was an act called Risatón, where a group of comedians such as Alvaro Salas, Ricardo Meruane and Bombo Fica gathered on stage. Then came the so-called Bailetón (danceathon), from the city of Concepción, directed by Rafael Araneda, Cristian Velasco and Laura Silva.

At dawn came the section called "Waking Women" by Felipe Camiroaga and Kike Morandé, with celebrities like Ivan Valenzuela, Fernando Solabarrieta and the winner Felipe Viel.

By the close of the show at the Theatre, the amount raised came to CL$3,566,320,945. There followed an hour during which the television channels separated to broadcast their respective newscasts. Then began the final section, in the National Stadium, with a performance of the Ode to Joy by José Alfredo Fuentes, who that year celebrated the 30th year of his career. There were appearances by artists including Proyecto Uno, Enrique Iglesias, Marcos Llunas, Ednita Nazario and El General.

It was surprising was that at 23.36 hours, the compere Kike Morandé was hoping that the total would exceed 5 billion pesos. The count yielded the surprising figure of $5,083,326,540, which meant that the goal would soon be reached.

Later, the final total emerged, bringing joy to all the entertainers and the crowd at the stadium: CL$5,692,426,301. Closing the event, Don Francisco showed his gratitude to all those who had helped, and closed the event with its official theme song.

== The rise of a song ==
During the final section of the show, at the National Stadium in Santiago, something notable took place when Jorge Hevia, one of the presenters, realized that part of the audience chanted ¡Vamos chilenos!, a song used by Chilean football fans to encourage their national team. The host of the programme Buenos días a todos (Eng.: Good morning everybody) on TVN began to sing the song. Then Don Francisco sang the song in his own way and almost magically the lyrics of a jingle emerged. It has since accompanied the Telethon and in general all Chileans and in later years would become the unofficial anthem of the Chile national football team:

"Vamos, vamos chilenos, que esta noche, lo vamos a lograr"

(Eng.: Come on, come on Chileans, tonight we are going to succeed)

That night after the Telethon achieved its goal the song was:

"Vamos, vamos chilenos, que esta noche, la meta se logró"

(Eng.: Come on, come on Chileans, tonight the goal was achieved)

"Gracias, gracias chilenos, que esta noche, la meta se logró"

(Eng.: Thank you, thank you Chileans, tonight the goal was achieved)

== Totals by time ==
Time (UTC−3)	Amount in pesos
22.14 (Dec. 6)	$223,752
00.17 (Dec. 7)	$143,726,595
02.15	$313,240,560
04.49	$364,382,735
06.59	$407,024,989
09.24	$416,994,341
10.34	$575,289,479
12.12	$682,352,573
12.33	$770,440,718
13.01	$851,268,169
14.17	$1,220,396,645
15.25	$1,564,330,116
16.58	$1,862,725,030
17.59	$2,230,426,114
20.04	$2,927,021,318
21.04	$3,566,320,945
22.40	$4,327,927,108
23.36	$5,083,326,540
00.32 (Dec. 8)	$5,692,426,301

== Sponsors ==
Company	Type of business	Amount (in pesos)
Arroz Tucapel	Rice	$38,611,948
Babysan	Nappies	$40,210,662
Banco de Chile	Bank	$100,000,000
Cachantún	Mineral water	$38,542,324
Cerveza Cristal	Beers	$62,488,181
Cocinero Trisol	Cooking oil	$32,165,181
Colún	Cheese	$39,180,092
Copec	Petroleum	$45,000,000
CTC Mundo	Telecom	$93,072,049
Dos en Uno (Caramelos Ritmo)	Confectionery	$35,059,400
Dos en Uno (Selz y Holanda)	Biscuits	$44,101,600
Elite	Toilet paper	$36,000,000
Elite	Napkins	$41,000,000
Fanta	Soft drinks	$45,000,000
Hasbro Universo	Toys	$32,180,150
Johnson's Clothes	Clothing	$35,240,000
Lan Chile	Airline	$86,276,811
Lucchetti	Pasta	$43,000,000
Omo Matic	Detergents	$45,125,390
Odontine	Toothpaste	$34,873,188
Organics	Shampoo	$37,294,397
Pisco La Serena	Pisco	$40,038,515
Ripley	Department store	$40,230,729
Savory	Ice cream	$35,220,000
Soprole	Dairy products	$35,502,176
Soprole	Yoghurt	$46,784,978
Super Pollo	Poultry	$43,134,233
Té Supremo	Teas	$36,720,478
Zuko	Dried juices	$38,230,525
Total Donaciones		$1,284,780,231

== Artists ==
=== Chilean singers ===
- (Chile) Illapu
- (Chile) Banda San Andrés
- (Chile) Sonora Palacios
- (Chile) Luis Jara
- (Chile) Los Grillitos de Graneros
- (Chile) Cristóbal
- (Chile) Nicole
- (Chile) Cecilia Echenique
- (Chile) El Monteaguilino
- (Chile) Ariztía
- (Chile) Keko Yungue
- (Chile) Inti-Illimani
- (Chile) Pablo Herrera
- (Chile) Wildo
- (Chile) La nueva ola
- (Chile) Carlos González
- (Chile) Miguel Zabaleta
- (Chile) Alberto Plaza
- (Chile) Buddy Richard
- (Chile) José Alfredo Fuentes

=== Singers from other countries ===
- (Argentina) (Venezuela) Ricardo Montaner
- (Argentina) Adrián y Los Dados Negros
- Tropi Match
- (Argentina) Las Primas
- (Dominican Republic) Ángela Carrasco
- (Colombia) La Sonora Dinamita
- (Colombia) Pancho y la Sonora Colorada
- (Mexico) Fobia
- (Italy) (Switzerland) Paolo Meneguzzi
- (Argentina) Los Delfines
- (Mexico) José Alonso
- Los Saca Chispas
- (Puerto Rico) Ednita Nazario
- (Spain) Marcos Llunas
- (Spain) Sergio Dalma
- (Mexico) La Lupita
- (Panama) El General
- (Puerto Rico) Proyecto Uno
- (Spain) Enrique Iglesias
- (Mexico) Marco Antonio Solís

=== Comedians ===
- Dinamita Show
- Los Indolatinos
- Revista del Humor
- Patricio Ibarra
- Álvaro Salas
- Pinto, Paredes y Angulo (Eduardo Thompson, Guillermo Bruce and Gilberto Guzmán)
- Paulo Iglesias
- Marcos Charola Pizarro
- Jorge "Chino" Navarrete

=== Magazine ===
- Ciclodanza
- Angel Torres, dancer

=== Children's Section ===
- Cachureos
- Roberto Nicolini
- Professor Rossa

== Curiosities ==
- During the first hours of the event, the numbers at the top of the totalisator rotated very fast or very slowly, to display whether the donations were accumulating very fast or very slowly.
- Before the start of a chat session prepared by Leo Caprile, Fernando Cordero Rusque, the then Chief of Police, asked Don Francisco to pass over a card indicating a new total raised, and announced a total of CL$1,220,396,645, which was surprising for the early hour of 2.15pm. This was the first time in 18 years that the total was announced by a police official. This was followed by the children's section with Ivan Valenzuela, Consuelo Saavedra and Angélica Castro.
- For the first time in a Telethon there was no board showing the current total and the target. Instead there was a huge screen, composed of multiple monitors, showing the figures in different graphics, as in the entrance of a bank.
- Mario Silva Leiva, better known as Cabro Carrera, described as a "drug trafficker", gave CL$3 million to the campaign.

== Transmission ==
- Telenorte
- Rock & Pop Televisión
- La Red
- UCV Televisión
- Televisión Nacional de Chile
- Megavisión
- Chilevisión
- Universidad Católica de Chile Televisión
- Red Metrópolis Intercom
- Red VTR Cablexpress
