= When the Saints Go Marching In (sports anthem) =

Song

The old hymn and jazz tune "When the Saints Go Marching In" is used by several teams in various sports. It may be used as the team's theme song or reserved for when they scored. Liverpool fans first used it as a football chant to honour their player Ian St John in the 1960s, a song that was also adopted by over 150 clubs. Southampton Football Club, for example, use it as a football chant as their nickname is The Saints; other football clubs use different variations of the song. It may be used with the standard lyrics, specialized lyrics, or no lyrics at all. When sung by a crowd, it is often started at a very slow tempo, around 70 beats per minute. The next verse is then dramatically sped up to somewhere around 140 beats per minute.

The following is a partial list of its notable uses.

== Teams-clubs ==
=== American football ===
- New Orleans Saints (New Orleans, Louisiana)
- Baylor University (Waco, Texas) Also serves as a fight song for Baylor's other sports teams
- Brigham Young University (Provo, Utah) Played by the school's marching band during its pre-game show

=== Australian rules football ===
- St Kilda Football Club (Melbourne, Victoria)

=== Association football ===
In various varieties of professional football, the teams using it include (in alphabetical order):

- Aberdeen F.C. (Aberdeen, Scotland) substituting "Reds" for "Saints" and "steaming" for "marching"
- Adelaide United (Adelaide, Australia) substituting "Reds" for "Saints"
- AIK Stockholm (Stockholm, Sweden)
- Aldershot Town F.C. (Aldershot, England) substituting "Shots" for "Saints" and "steaming" for "marching"
- Alvechurch FC (Alvechurch, England) substituting "Church" for "saints"
- Royal Antwerp FC (Antwerp, Belgium) substituting "Reds" (the club’s nickname) for "Saints"
- Atlético Ottawa (Ottawa, Ontario, Canada) substituting "Atleti" for "saints"
- Bengaluru FC (Bengaluru, India) substituting "Blues" for "Saints"
- Birmingham City F.C. (Birmingham, England) substituting "Blues" for "Saints"
- Bristol Rovers F.C. (Bristol, England) substituting "Gas" for "Saints"
- Chelsea F.C. (London, England) substituting "Blues" for "Saints" and "steaming" for "marching"
- Chicago Stars FC (Chicago, Illinois, United States) substituting “Stars” for “Saints”
- Colorado Rapids (Denver, Colorado, United States) substituting "Rapids" for "Saints"
- Chalfont St Peter (Buckinghamshire, England)
- Detroit City F.C. (Detroit, Michigan, United States) substituting "Le Rouge" (the club's nickname) for "Saints"
- Dinamo Zagreb (Zagreb, Croatia) Supporter group "Blue Saints" Use the melody but with new lyrics: "O Dinamo, Mi volimo, I za njega živimo, bez njega ne bi bili sretni, jer je ponos grada mog!"
- Djurgårdens IF (Stockholm, Sweden) Supporter group "Blue Saints"
- Drogheda United F.C. (Drogheda, Ireland )substituting "Drogs" (the club's nickname) for "Saints"
- Dundee United F.C. (Dundee, Scotland) substituting "Shed" (the name of United's most famous stand) for "Saints"
- Fulham F.C. (London, England) substituting "Whites" (the club's nickname) for "Saints"
- Hellas Verona F.C. (Verona, Italy) substituting "e quando i blu saranno in ciel"
- Heart of Midlothian F.C. (Edinburgh, Scotland) substituting "Hearts" for "Saints"
- India national football team by their supporting group Blue Pilgrims, substituting "Blues" for "Saints"
- Inverness Caledonian Thistle F.C. (Inverness, Scotland) Use the melody but with new lyrics: "We've got a bridge and a castle" is sung three times, followed by "Inverness is wonderful"
- Ipswich Town F.C., (Ipswich, England) substituting "Town" for "saints".
- Leicester City F.C. (Leicester, England) substituting "Blues" (the team colour) for "Saints"
- Liverpool F.C. (Liverpool, England) substituting "Reds" (the team colour) for "Saints". It may, however, originally have been introduced by fans to honour Ian St John (in recognition of the "Saint" in his name), one of their star players of the 1960s.
- Luton Town (Luton, England) substituting "Town" for "Saints" and "steaming" for "marching"
- Maidstone United F.C. (Maidstone, England) substituting “Stones” for “Saints”
- Manchester United F.C. (Greater Manchester, England)
- Middlesbrough F.C. (Middlesbrough, England)
- Melbourne City F.C. (Melbourne, Australia) substituting "Heart" (the former name of the club) for "Saints" and "by the Yarra" (the river located outside the south stand of the club's home ground, where the active support is located) for "in that number"
- Minnesota United F.C. (Saint Paul, Minnesota, United States) substituting "Minnesota" (the state name) for "Number" as well as substituting "Loons" (the club's nickname) for "Saints"
- MK Dons (Milton Keynes, England) substituting "Dons" for "Saints"
- Newcastle United Football Club (Newcastle upon Tyne, England) substituting "Mags" (the club's nickname) for "Saints"
- New England Revolution (Foxborough, Massachusetts, United States) substituting "Revs" (the club's nickname) for "Saints"
- Norwich City Football Club (Norwich, England) substituting "Greens" for "Saints
- Oldham Athletic F.C. (Oldham, England) substituting "Blues" (the club's colour) for "Saints." A Dixieland version is used.
- Peterborough United F.C. (Peterborough, England) substituting "Posh" for "Saints" and "steaming" for "marching"
- Plymouth Argyle F.C. (Plymouth, England) substituting "Greens" for "Saints"
- Portland Thorns FC (Portland, Oregon) substituting "Thorns" for "Saints"
- Queens Park Rangers F.C. (London, England) substituting "R's" for "Saints"
- Persija Jakarta (Jakarta, Indonesia) substituting "Oh Persija Jaya Raya"
- Pittsburgh Riverhounds SC (Pittsburgh, Pennsylvania, United States) substituting "Hounds" for "Saints"
- Rochdale A.F.C. (Rochdale, England) substituting "Dale" for "Saints".
- Rotherham United F.C. (Rotherham, England)
- San Jose Earthquakes (San Jose, California, United States) substituting "Quakes" (the club's nickname) for "Saints"
- San Francisco City FC (San Francisco, California, United States) sings "when the fog comes rolling in"
- Sheffield United F.C. (Sheffield, England) substituting "Blades" (the club's nickname) for "Saints"
- SK Brann (Bergen, Norway). Use the melody with different lyrics, sung in Norwegian. An English translation is "The city of Bergen is beautiful, and we have the best beer and tits".
- Solihull Moors (Solihull, England) substituting "Moors" for "Saints"
- Southampton F.C. (Southampton, England). The club is nicknamed "The Saints"
- St. John's University (New York City, New York, United States) substituting "Storm" (from the team's nickname "the Red Storm") for "Saints"
- St Johnstone Football Club (Perth, Scotland)
- St Mirren Football Club (Paisley, Scotland) The club is nicknamed "The Saints"
- St. Patrick's Athletic Football Club (Dublin, Ireland)
- Swindon Town F.C. (Swindon, England) substituting "Reds" (the team's home colour) for "Saints", and "steaming" for "marching" (due to the town's railway heritage)
- Toronto F.C. (Toronto, Ontario, Canada) substituting "Reds" (the club's nickname) for "Saints"
- Tottenham Hotspur F.C. (London, England) substituting "Spurs" (the club's nickname) for "Saints"
- United States national soccer teams (United States) substituting "Yanks" for "Saints"
- Vancouver Whitecaps FC (Vancouver, British Columbia, Canada) substituting "Caps" for "Saints"
- West Bromwich Albion F.C. (West Midlands, England) substituting "Stripes" for "Saints"
- Wolverhampton Wanderers F.C (West Midlands, England) substituting "Wolves" for “Saints”
- Real Club Celta de Vigo (Vigo, Galicia, Spain)
- Athletic Bilbao (Bilbao, Basque Country, Spain) substituting "Lions" for "Saints", and "roaring" for "marching"
- Real Valladolid (Valladolid, Castile and León, Spain), substituting "Purples" for "Saints", and "walking" for "marching"
- Real Sociedad (San Sebastián, Basque Country, Spain) substituting "Striped" for "Saints", and "playing" for "marching"
- Atlético Madrid (Madrid, Spain) substituting "Atleti" for "saints"
- Guangzhou F.C. (Guangzhou, China) the lyrics are rewritten in Cantonese, while "When the Saints Go Marching in, O Lord I want to be in that number" was rewritten with "Allez Allez Allez,我哋来为梦想打拼(Literally means "Let's together fighting for the dream")"
- Santos Futebol Clube (Santos, Brazil)

=== Rugby ===
==== Rugby Union ====
- Northampton Saints (Northampton, England)

==== Rugby League ====
- Hull Kingston Rovers (Kingston upon Hull, England) substituting "Reds" for "Saints"
- St George Illawarra Dragons (Kogarah (Sydney) and Wollongong, New South Wales, Australia)
- St Helens R.F.C. (St Helens, England)

=== Other sports ===
In ice hockey:

- It is played by the St. Louis Blues of the NHL when the team scores as well as at the beginning of the game and at the end of each period. Its use stems from the first years of the Blues, as initially the strongest of the NHL's late-1960s expansion teams, and was sung by fans as "When the Blues go marching in..." Sometimes, Blues fans change verses to "Oh when the Cup comes to St. Lou/ Oh when the Cup comes to St. Lou/ Oh Lord I want to be in that number/ When the Blues come marching in." Charles Glenn, the Blues national anthem singer, also sings this song with the crowd.
- Whenever the Saints score a goal at St. Lawrence University, the crowd will sing "When the Saints Go Marching In" immediately after the goal is announced. A skating saint sign at each end of the arena flashes as well.

It is the college basketball fight song of, among others:

- Providence College (Providence, Rhode Island, United States)
- Saint Joseph's University (Philadelphia, Pennsylvania, United States)
- Saint Louis University (St. Louis, Missouri, United States)

In college basketball, it is chanted by the University of Oregon student section (the Oregon Pit Crew), replacing "Saints" with "Ducks".

It is often played by the pep band during breaks in play. However, none of these teams use a true Dixieland version, but a version more suited to a college fight song.

It is played by St. Mary's School Yala, a high school in Kenya, as well as St. Anthony High School in California.

At the 1984 Summer Olympics singer Etta James performed the song during the opening ceremonies.

== Versions ==
=== St Kilda Saints Football Club version lyrics ===
This has been in use since the 1970s by the St. Kilda Saints Football Club. The version of the song was recorded by the Fable Singers by permission under license and only mentions the St. Kilda Football Club. The Official St. Kilda Football Club song is played at the ground when the St. Kilda Football Club Players run out before a game and after a St. Kilda victory in the Australian Football League, followed by a hearty rendition of the song by the players in the rooms after the match (it is broadcast by permission).

Oh when the Saints, go marching in,
Oh when the Saints go marching in,
Oh how I want to be with St Kilda,
Oh when the Saints go marching in.

Oh when the Saints (Oh when the Saints), go marching in (go marching in),
Oh when the Saints go marching in,
Oh how I want to be with St Kilda,
Oh when the Saints go marching in.

=== St George Illawarra Dragons ===
Often sung by the parochial supporters of the Dragons (dubbed the "Dragon Army"), the version of the song used is very similar to St Kilda's. This version does, however, remain loyal to the original, with the third line of both stanzas being "I wanna be in that number". On rare occasion, further verses are sung by the "Dragon Army".

=== Providence College Friars ===
Saints was not originally used, but rather Friar Away, a typical college fight song. However, in the 1950s, a local radio station (WPRO-AM) began using it as the theme music to their coverage of Providence College basketball games. The fans took to it so well that it has become the fight song of the college, with Friar Away slipping into obscurity, save for a brief revival in the late 1990s.
