= Guy Van Duser =

American jazz musician

Guy Van Duser (born July 9, 1948) is an American jazz and folk guitarist. He recorded for Rounder from the 1970s to the 1990s and often appeared on the radio show A Prairie Home Companion.

His guitar arrangement of "The Stars and Stripes Forever" was played by Chet Atkins. Van Duser is a professor of guitar at Berklee College of Music.

== Discography ==
- Old Wood and Winter Wine with Bill Staines (Mineral River, 1977)
- Finger Style Guitar Solos (Rounder, 1977)
- The New Pennywhistle Album with Billy Novick (Green Linnet, 1978)
- Get Yourself a New Broom... with Billy Novick (Rounder, 1979)
- Stride Guitar (Rounder, 1981)
- Raisin' the Rent with Billy Novick (Rounder, 1982)
- Got the World On a String (Rounder, 1985)
- These 'n' That 'n' Those with Billy Novick (Rounder, 1986)
- American Fingerstyle Guitar (Rounder, 1987)
- Exactly Like Us with Billy Novick (Rounder, 1989)
- Guy & Billy with Billy Novick (Daring, 1994)
- Every Little Moment with Billy Novick (Daring, 1996)
- Lovely Sunday Afternoon (Daring, 2000)
- A Session with Guy Van Duser (CDBaby, 2012)

== Books ==
- Stride Guitar (Mel Bay Publications, Inc., ISBN 0-7866-4668-3)
