= Olé, Olé, Olé =

Chant used in association football

"Olé, Olé, Olé" is a chant used in sport. The chant is based on the Spanish interjection "Olé" used to signify approval by the spectators in bullfighting; however, the chant is not used in Spain. The popular version of the "Olé, Olé, Olé" chant was first used in a 1985 song written by the Belgians Roland Verlooven and Grand Jojo called "Anderlecht Champion" as "Allez, Allez, Allez, Allez" in French, but became "Olé, Olé, Olé, Olé" in Spanish in a version titled "E Viva Mexico" created for the 1986 FIFA World Cup in Mexico. This version of the chant quickly spread around the world and chanted by football fans in tribute to a team or a player, and it is now also widely used in other sports as well as in non-sporting events.

== Origin ==
Olé is a Spanish interjection used to cheer on or praise a performance commonly used in bullfighting and flamenco dance. In flamenco music and dance, shouts of "olé" often accompany the dancer during and at the end of the performance, and a singer in cante jondo may emphasize the word "olé" with melismatic turns. In bullfighting, the word is commonly shouted by the crowds as a cry of approval to cheer on a series of moves performed by the bullfighter, with each move greeted with an "olé". The word has also become associated with other sports since the 20th century. In association football, "Olé" as an interjection as used in bullfighting is believed to be first used in Brazil for Garrincha in 1958. The word may be chanted by a crowd for a team or player who made an exceptional performance, and it may be used to demean the opposition when their own team put in a dominant performance.

The word "olé" has also been chanted in songs; in the 1950s, a form of the "olé" chant was heard in American Television on the sitcom I Love Lucy. Dezi Arnaz chanted "Olé, Olé, Olé" during his signature song "Babalú" to Babalú-Ayé, an African deity. The song was written by Margarita Lecuona in 1939. An early chant similar to the "Olé, Olé, Olé" chant was heard in Spain in league game in 1982, and this version quickly spread to other clubs. It was first sung in San Sebastián as "Campeones, hobe, hobe, hobe" (hobe means "the best" in Basque) when Real Sociedad won the 1982 La Liga title, but sung in other parts of Spain as "Oé, Oé, Oé", and in other European countries outside of Spain as "Ole, Ole, Ole".

The current popular version of the "Olé, Olé, Olé" chant was first used in a Belgian song "Anderlecht Champion" initially as "Allez, Allez, Allez, Allez" in French, which morphed into the Spanish "Olé, Olé, Olé, Olé" in a version of the song used for the Mexico 86 World Cup. This version of the chant quickly spread and is now commonly used by fans in association football worldwide; for example, has been used by the supporters of the Costa Rica national football team and the Republic of Ireland national football team. The chant is also used by fans of other sport, such as the hockey team Montreal Canadiens at the Bell Centre and the Welsh rugby union. This chant has also been used in non-sporting events around the world.

== Modern versions, beginning with Roland Verlooven and Grand Jojo's composition ==
"Anderlecht Champion"
- 7" vinyl single cover

Song by Grand Jojo
- Released: 1985
- Genre: Pop
- Length: 2:53
- Label: Vogue
- Songwriters: Armath, Jean Déja
- Producer: Roland Verlooven

"Olé, Olé, Olé (The Name of the Game)"

Single by The Fans
- Released: 1987
- Genre: Euro disco
- Label: ZYX Records
- Songwriter: Armath – Deja
- Producer: Roland Verlooven

In 1985, Hans Kusters, the head of Belgian music label Hans Kusters Music, asked producer Roland Verlooven and the Belgian singer Grand Jojo (Jules Jean Van Obbergen) to write a song for the Belgian football team R.S.C. Anderlecht who were the league champions in the 1984–85 season. Verlooven (also known as Armath) and Van Obbergen wrote the song called "Anderlecht Champion" at Grand Jojo's home in Groot-Bijgaarden, and it was recorded both in French and Dutch by Grand Jojo with the players of Anderlecht including the manager Paul Van Himst. In both French and the Dutch versions of the song, the chorus features the mixed French and English line: "Allez, Allez, Allez, Allez / We are the champions, we are the champions". The song was released that year by Disques Vogue.

The following year, a mariachi-influenced version was created called "E Viva Mexico" in support of the Belgium national team at the World Cup in Mexico. Grand Jojo was retained for the French version of the song, while Walter Capiau & De Oranje Duivels sang the Dutch version instead. These versions introduced the chant "Olé, Olé, Olé, Olé" in the chorus. Belgium performed well at the World Cup to reach the semifinals, and the version by Walter Capiau & De Oranje Duivels peaked at No. 29 on the Belgian chart and it became the No. 1 Flemish song after the World Cup.

In 1987, Roland Verlooven produced an internationally popular version of the song, "Olé, Olé, Olé (The Name of the Game)", performed by a musical group called "The Fans". The song was released in various European countries including in the UK in September 1987. In Austria, The Fans' version reached No. 21 and in Sweden, it reached No. 3 in their respective national charts in 1988. This "Olé, Olé, Olé, Olé" chorus of this song became the chant commonly used all over the world.

The chorus of the song is "Olé, olé, olé, we are the champions, we are the champions", but it is used in football chant as "Olé, olé, olé, olé, we are the champs, we are the champs", losing a complete syllable and note of the song. The chant may also consists entirely of a series of "olé".

=== Covers and adaptations ===
"Olé, Olé, Olé" has been covered in 50 countries. In Germany, Tony Marshall sang a German cover in 1986 titled "Wir sind die Champions (olé, olé, olé)". A Portuguese version was recorded by José Rocha for Benfica. In 1988, the Czech songwriter František Ringo Čech wrote lyrics in Czech for "Olé, Olé, Olé (The Name of the Game)", which was recorded as a music video and sung by choir of Czech football players including Antonín Panenka, František Veselý and others. In Japan, the song recorded by The Waves as "We are the Champ 〜The Name of the Game〜" was used as the official anthem for the national team in 1993, and it was also used in the broadcast of the J.League when it was inaugurated that year. The Japanese versions have sold over 3 million copies in Japan.

The chant is also used in a number of songs. In 1990 it featured prominently in the official song by the Republic of Ireland football team before the World Cup in Italy, Put 'Em Under Pressure. In 1998, Chumbawamba recorded the hit "Top of the World (Olé, Olé, Olé)" which include the "Olé, Olé, Olé" chant. In 1999, the chant was used in the chorus of "¡Olé!" by the Bouncing Souls on their album Hopeless Romantic. In 2009 the chant was recorded by Overtone and Yollandi Nortjie, which was used in the 2009 film Invictus and released in the soundtracks of the film. In 2014, Brazilian Carlinhos Brown used the chant in a World Cup-inspired song called Brasil Brasil.

The chant is sung frequently by the audience, composed mostly of youths and young adults, at the end of Hillsong Young & Free songs.

Coldplay uses the chant during the performance of their song "God Put a Smile Upon Your Face" in their Live in Buenos Aires album. The band also incorporates the chant into the song "Don Quixote (Spanish Rain)", which was played on the Viva La Vida Tour in Latin America in 2010, but "Don Quixote" was never released. Coldplay include this chant modified in "olé, olé, olé, olé, coldplay, coldplay" into the song "Infinity Sign" of Music of the Spheres.

In 2024, American punk rock band The Offspring used this chant in the last part of their song "Come To Brazil".

In 2025, Belgian singer-songwriter Stromae remixed the composition in conjunction with the team.

== In other sports ==
In North America, it first became synonymous with the Montreal Canadiens and it has been chanted by Canadiens fans for a few decades. Fans of the Montreal Canadiens could be heard singing this chant after winning the North Division and obtaining the Campbell Bowl on June 24, 2021, also Saint-Jean-Baptiste Day, a provincial holiday. This was the first time that the Montreal Canadiens had been to the Stanley Cup Final since 1993. In the United States, the chant has been used at American football games, and baseball games. New York Mets fans have adapted the chant from "olé" to "José" to cheer for José Reyes. Toronto Blue Jays fans similarly used the chant for José Bautista. Cleveland Guardians fans use the chant for José Ramirez. Chicago White Sox fans used the chant for José Valentín in the early 2000s, and adapted it for José Abreu when he was with the team.

The chant is also common at WWE events taking place in Europe, Montreal or in the U.S. For example, the chant was heard at the April 8th, 2013 edition of WWE Raw at the Izod Center. The chant was also repeatedly heard throughout the May 4, 2015, telecast of WWE Raw that took place at the Bell Centre in Montreal, as well as the April 30, 2018, telecast of WWE Raw that also emanated from the Bell Centre, when wrestler Seth Rollins, who was the WWE Intercontinental Champion at the time, was greeted by huge cheers and an Olé, Olé, Olé chant before thanking the crowd with “Merci beaucoup” (French for “thank you very much”). It was first heard in wrestling before WWE when Sami Zayn, who wrestled in independents as El Generico, used it as his intro music.

Montreal-area born WWE star Sami Zayn led the Bell Centre crowd into singing the Olé, Olé, Olé chant during the April 15, 2019 episode of WWE Raw before eventually (kayfabe) turning his back on his hometown fans. Zayn previously wrestled in the independent circuits as El Generico, a masked luchador character, and he used the Bouncing Souls' "Olé!" as his entrance theme at the time. Fans would often do the chant during his matches, and the chants would follow him into the WWE as well.

During a WWE SmackDown house show at the Place Bell in Laval (a few miles north of Montreal), the fans did the Olé, Olé, Olé chant when Roman Reigns pulled out a hockey goalie stick from under the ring to use as a weapon during his Street Fight match with King Corbin. Place Bell is also the home arena of the AHL's Laval Rocket, the farm team of the Canadiens.

During the fights of Conor McGregor his supporters often use this chant in Mixed martial arts (MMA) UFC events in stadium.

The chant has been used for the Argentinian football player Diego Maradona as "Ole Ole Ole Ole, Diego, Diego". Similarly in tennis, fans of the Argentinian player Juan Martin del Potro may chant "Ole, ole, ole – Del-Po, Del-Po" after hard-fought points in a match.

The cheer is also widely used by supporters of college soccer in the United States. This led to the creation of a mascot at the University of California, Santa Barbara, which was named Olé.

When the Wisconsin Badgers football team scores a field goal, fans often sing this chant for player Rafael Gaglianone, who is from Brazil.

The chant was used by supporters of Ayrton Senna throughout his career in Formula One.

A rendition of this song (With lyrics modified by Kemptville, Ontario-born Emily Seguin) was used frequently before games throughout OSU youth soccer leagues across Canada.

The chant was also commonly heard during celebrations for Toronto Raptors players after they had won their first title in the 2019 NBA Finals.

The cheer is also used by the South Africa national rugby union team, the Springboks. During the Pool B match between the New Zealand national rugby union team, the All Blacks, and the Springboks, during the 2019 Rugby World Cup, the crowd chanted "Olé Olé Olé" over the Haka.

== Usage outside sports ==
The chant was adapted by the Nationalist Party for the 1987 Maltese general election campaign. The chorus of the song was changed to "Olé, Olé, Olé, Nazzjonalisti" referring to the supporters of the Nationalist party.

The chant was also adapted by protesters during the Romanian Revolution while Nicolae Ceaușescu fled Bucharest as "Ole, Ole, Ole, Ole, Ceaușescu nu mai e (Ceaușescu is no more)".

When the border at the Berlin Wall opened and citizens were permitted to cross freely on 9 November 1989, people were heard chanting "Ole, Ole, Ole" while waving the German flag.

When The Rolling Stones performed in Havana for the first time in 2016, the crowds chanted "Ole, Ole, Ole".

During a campaign stop in Montreal leading up to the 2021 Canadian federal election, New Democratic Party leader Jagmeet Singh led supporters at Parc Raymond-Préfontaine in the Mercier–Hochelaga-Maisonneuve borough in singing a remixed version of the song, changing "Olé, Olé Olé Olé… Olé, Olé" to "Oser, Oser Oser Oser… Ensemble Ensemble". "Oser ensemble" is the French version of the NDP's "Dare Together" campaign slogan that the party used during the 2021 Canadian election.

In 2022, supporters of Brazilian President-elect Luiz Inácio Lula da Silva chanted "Olê, olê, olê, olá, Lula, Lula".

In November 2023, during Taylor Swift’s concerts in Buenos Aires, as part of The Eras Tour, the Argentine audience sang "Olé, Olé, Olé, Olé, Taylor, Taylor".

In the movie Furiosa: A Mad Max Saga, the song can be heard when Furiosa arrives at the Bullet Farm.

== See also ==
- Campione 2000
- Olé (sports newspaper)
- Football chant
