= Hala Madrid y nada más =

2014 single by Real Madrid feat. RedOne

Single by Real Madrid feat. RedOne
- Released: 25 May 2014
- Studio: PKO Studios
- Genre: Anthem
- Length: 2:57
- Label: RedOne Records
- Composer: Nadir Khayat
- Lyricist: Manuel Jabois
- Producer: RedOne

Music video
- "Hala Madrid...y nada más" on YouTube

"¡Hala Madrid!...y nada más" (Spanish for 'hail Madrid!...and nothing else') is the popular anthem of Spanish football club Real Madrid. It was written by RedOne and Manuel Jabois and released in 2014 after Real Madrid won their 10th UEFA Champions League title (La Décima). The anthem is now regularly played and sung by fans before match start at the Bernabéu, and after a Real Madrid player scores a goal.

== Background ==
The anthem was commissioned by the president of Real Madrid Florentino Pérez. Composer Nadir Khayat (RedOne) said that he was a Real Madrid fan and wanted to contribute something to the club. He created the tune of the anthem while travelling on a plane between Madrid and Morocco in 2010. He programmed and recorded the anthem's symphonic part while in Sweden. The lyrics were written by journalist Manuel Jabois. Jabois originally wrote a longer set of lyrics but truncated it to fit the tune.

The song is titled "¡Hala Madrid!...y nada más"; the term "Hala Madrid" is a battle cry used to cheer on Real Madrid. "Hala" is a word of Arabic origin meaning "Come on". "¡Hala Madrid!" is also the title of Real Madrid's official anthem (commonly known as "Las mocitas madrileñas" after a line in the lyrics) commissioned by former president Santiago Bernabéu to commemorate the golden jubilee of the club in 1952. The song was written by Luis Cisneros Galiane and recorded by José de Aguilar. For the term "y nada más" ("and nothing else"), Jabois explained that "it sums up a bit what Madrid is, either you love it or...".

"Hala Madrid y nada más" was recorded at the PKO Studios in April 2014 by Real Madrid’s squad including Cristiano Ronaldo, Iker Casillas, Sergio Ramos, Karim Benzema, Gareth Bale, Luka Modrić, Xabi Alonso, Angel Di Maria, Isco, and Marcelo, as well as their manager Carlo Ancelotti. It was played before the games against Barcelona in the 2014 Copa del Rey Final and against Bayern Munich and Atlético Madrid in the Champions League games to motivate the players. The anthem was released to the public after Madrid’s 10th Champions League win. At the stadium, it is now regularly played and sung by fans before matches and after a Real Madrid player scores a goal.

A version was also recorded by Plácido Domingo in December 2014, originally intended for a 2015 release, but Real Madrid did not reach the final that year. It was released in May 2016 after Real Madrid won their 11th Champions League title (La Undécima).

== Commercial performance ==
The anthem topped the 2014 iTunes chart in Spain and 17 other countries around the world, including Costa Rica, the Czech Republic, Ecuador, El Salvador, Guatemala, Honduras, Hungary, Israel, Mexico, Panama, Peru, Slovakia, and Sweden.

== Charts ==
=== Weekly charts ===
Chart (2014)	Peak position
France (SNEP)	143
Hungary (Single Top 40)	13
Spain (Promusicae)	1

=== Year-end charts ===
Chart (2014)	Position
Spain (PROMUSICAE)	25
