= Bow Wow Wow discography =

Discography of English new wave band Bow Wow Wow

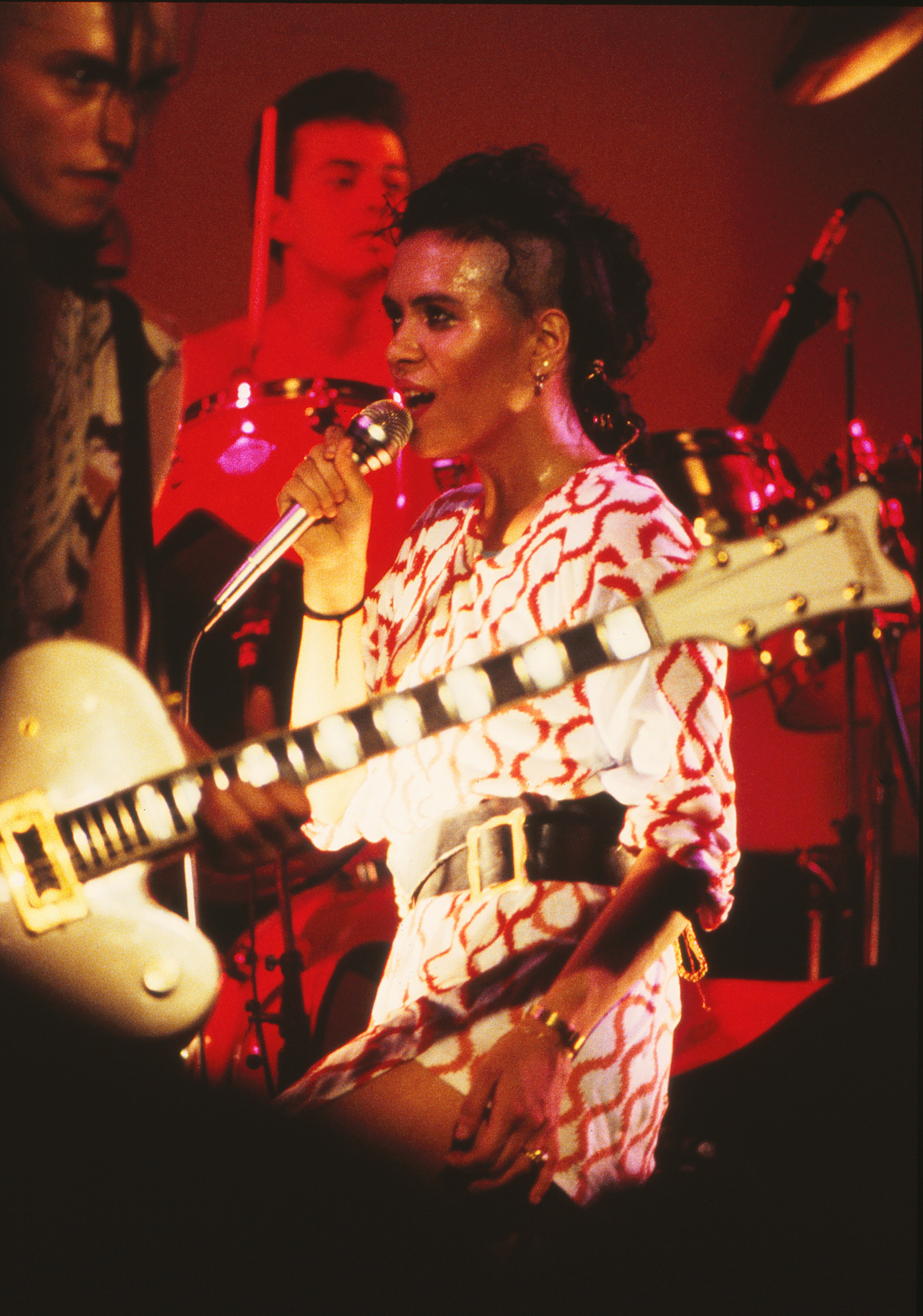
- Bow Wow Wow performing in 1982
- Studio albums: 2
- EPs: 5
- Live albums: 1
- Compilation albums: 14
- Singles: 17
- Box sets: 1

This is the discography of English new wave band Bow Wow Wow.

== Albums ==
=== Studio albums ===
Title	Album details	Peak chart positions			
Title	Album details	UK	NL	SWE	US
See Jungle! See Jungle! Go Join Your Gang Yeah! City All Over, Go Ape Crazy!	Released: 16 October 1981; Label: RCA; Formats: LP, MC	26	—	—	192
When the Going Gets Tough, the Tough Get Going	Released: February 1983; Label: RCA; Formats: LP, MC	—	24	24	82
"—" denotes releases that did not chart or were not released in that territory.

=== Live albums ===
Title	Album details
Live in Japan	Released: March 1997; Label: Receiver; Formats: CD

=== Compilation albums ===
Title	Album details	Peak chart positions		
Title	Album details	UK	AUS	US
I Want Candy (UK) (Note: This is a different album from the RCA release. This release comprises the Your Cassette Pet mini-album alongside all the singles and B-sides released on EMI. Outside of the UK, it was released as Twelve Original Recordings in North America and Original Recordings everywhere else.)	Released: 19 July 1982; Label: EMI, Harvest; Formats: LP, MC	26	—	—
I Want Candy (US)	Released: August 1982; Label: RCA; Formats: LP, MC	—	88	123
The Best of Bow Wow Bow	Released: 27 November 1989; Label: Receiver; Formats: CD, LP	—	—	—
Girl Bites Dog – Your Compact Disc Pet	Released: August 1993; Label: EMI; Formats: CD; US-only release	—	—	—
Go Wild – The Best of Bowwowwow	Released: 1994; Label: RCA/BMG; Formats: CD, MC	—	—	—
Aphrodisiac – The Best of Bow Wow Wow	Released: October 1996; Label: Camden/BMG; Formats: CD	—	—	—
The Best of Bow Wow Wow	Released: October 1996; Label: RCA; Formats: CD, MC; US-only release	—	—	—
Wild in the U.S.A.	Released: November 1998; Label: Cleopatra; Formats: CD; US-only release	—	—	—
I Want Candy – Anthology	Released: October 2003; Label: Castle Music; Formats: 2xCD	—	—	—
I Want Candy – The Best of Bow Wow Wow	Released: October 2003; Label: Collectables/BMG; Formats: CD; US-only release	—	—	—
We Are the 80s	Released: 18 July 2006; Label: RCA/Legacy; Formats: CD; US-only release	—	—	—
Love, Peace & Harmony – The Best of Bow Wow Wow	Released: 24 March 2008; Label: Sony BMG; Formats: CD	—	—	—
Playlist: The Very Best of Bow Wow Wow	Released: 2 September 2008; Label: Sony BMG; Formats: CD; US-only release	—	—	—
Mile High Club Live	Released: 2009; Label: Pegasus; Formats: CD	—	—	—
"—" denotes releases that did not chart or were not released in that territory.

=== Box sets ===
Title	Album details
Your Box Set Pet (The Complete Recordings 1980–1984)	Released: 25 May 2018; Label: Cherry Red; Formats: 3xCD

== EPs ==
Title	Album details	Peak chart positions	
Title	Album details	UK	US
Your Cassette Pet	Released: 10 November 1980; Label: EMI; Formats: MC	58	—
The Last of the Mohicans	Released: May 1982; Label: RCA; Formats: 12", MC; North America-only release	—	67
Teenage Queen	Released: May 1982; Label: RCA; Formats: 12", MC; Japan-only release	—	—
Fliphits	Released: 1983; Label: RCA; Formats: MC	—	—
John Peel Session (20th October 1980)	Released: 29 April 2011; Label: Parlophone; Formats: digital download	—	—
"—" denotes releases that did not chart or were not released in that territory.

== Singles ==
Title	Year	Peak chart positions									Album
Title	Year	UK	AUS	BE (FL)	IRE	NL	NZ	US	US Dance	US Main	Album
"C·30 C·60 C·90 Go"	1980	34	—	—	—	—	—	—	—	—	Non-album single
"Louis Quatorze"/"Sexy Eiffel Towers" (Continental Europe-only release)	1981	—	—	—	—	—	—	—	—	—	Your Cassette Pet
"W.O.R.K. (N.O. Nah, No No My Daddy Don't)"	1981	62	—	—	—	—	—	—	83	—	Non-album singles
"Prince of Darkness"	1981	58	—	—	—	—	—	—	—	—	Non-album singles
"Chihuahua"	1981	51	—	—	—	—	—	—	48	—	See Jungle! See Jungle! Go Join Your Gang Yeah, City All Over! Go Ape Crazy!
"Go Wild in the Country"	1982	7	—	—	11	—	—	—	—	—	See Jungle! See Jungle! Go Join Your Gang Yeah, City All Over! Go Ape Crazy!
"Orang-Outang" (North America-only release)	1982	—	—	—	—	—	—	—	—	—	See Jungle! See Jungle! Go Join Your Gang Yeah, City All Over! Go Ape Crazy!
"See Jungle! (Jungle Boy)"	1982	45	—	—	—	—	—	—	—	—	See Jungle! See Jungle! Go Join Your Gang Yeah, City All Over! Go Ape Crazy!
"I Want Candy"	1982	9	39	30	7	23	30	62	36	22	I Want Candy
"Baby, Oh No" (North America and Australasia-only release)	1982	—	—	—	—	—	—	103	58	—	I Want Candy
"Louis Quatorze" (re-recorded version)	1982	66	—	—	—	—	—	—	—	—	I Want Candy
"Fools Rush In"	1982	—	—	—	—	—	—	—	—	—	I Want Candy
"Teenage Queen" (Japan-only release)	1982	—	—	—	—	—	—	—	—	—	Non-album single
"Do You Wanna Hold Me?"	1983	47	95	4	—	3	—	77	—	—	When the Going Gets Tough, the Tough Get Going
"The Man Mountain" (Netherlands-only release)	1983	—	—	5	—	8	—	—	—	—	When the Going Gets Tough, the Tough Get Going
"Love, Peace and Harmony" (US-only release)	1983	—	—	—	—	—	—	—	—	—	When the Going Gets Tough, the Tough Get Going
"Mario (Your Own Way to Paradise)" (Netherlands-only release)	1983	—	—	—	—	—	—	—	—	—	When the Going Gets Tough, the Tough Get Going
"—" denotes releases that did not chart or were not released in that territory.
