= Teenage Queen =

EP by Bow Wow Wow
- Released: 1982
- Recorded: 1982
- Genre: New wave
- Label: RCA
- Producer: Bow Wow Wow

Bow Wow Wow chronology
| The Last of the Mohicans (1982) | Teenage Queen (1982) | I Want Candy (1982) |

Teenage Queen is an EP by new wave band Bow Wow Wow, released in 1982 by RCA Records. It was commissioned for advertising use by the Japanese cosmetic brand Perky Jean by Shiseido and was only released in Japan.

Sung to the music from the band's then-current single "Baby, Oh No", the title track's lyrics extolled the virtues of the Perky Jean make-up line. The track is often misidentified as "Perky Jean" due to the chorus of "Hey perky, perky jean, you make me feel like a teenage queen".

The album also includes "El Bosso Dicho" (which had first appeared as the b-side of one of the band's earlier singles, "Go Wild in the Country"), along with the band's biggest hit, "I Want Candy", first featured on the group's North America-only EP, The Last of the Mohicans earlier in the year.

When Cherry Red Records reissued See Jungle! See Jungle! Go Join Your Gang Yeah, City All Over! Go Ape Crazy! in 2010 as a 2-CD set, entitled See Jungle! See Jungle! Go Join Your Gang/B-Sides, all 5 tracks from Teenage Queen were included on the second disc. On 25 May 2018, Cherry Red released the three-disc set Your Box Set Pet (The Complete Recordings 1980–1984), which included Teenage Queen in its entirety on the third disc.

The record Teenage Queen is not related to a widely ported early strip poker computer game from 1988.

== Track listing ==
All tracks are written by Malcolm McLaren, Matthew Ashman, Leigh Gorman and David Barbarossa except where noted.

Side 1
| No. | Title | Writer(s) | Length |
|---|---|---|---|
| 1. | "Teenage Queen" | | 3:23 |
| 2. | "Joy of Eating Raw Flesh" | | 3:20 |
| 3. | "El Bosso Dicho!" | Barbarossa, Gorman, Ashman | 2:12 |

Side 2
| No. | Title | Writer(s) | Length |
|---|---|---|---|
| 4. | "I Want Candy" | Bert Berns, Bob Feldman, Jerry Goldstein, Richard Gottehrer | 2:44 |
| 5. | "Cowboy" | | 3:25 |
| Total length: | | | 14:04 |
