= I Want Candy (disambiguation) =

"I Want Candy" a song written and originally recorded by The Strangeloves

I Want Candy can also refer to:

- I Want Candy, a compilation album by Bow Wow Wow released by EMI in the UK. Released in the US as Twelve Original Recordings.
- I Want Candy (album), another compilation album by Bow Wow Wow, released by RCA in the US
- I Want Candy (film), a 2007 British comedy film from Ealing Studios
- "I Want Candy" (D:TNG episode), an episode of the Canadian serial teen drama television series Degrassi: The Next Generation
- "I Want Candy", a song from the American animated television series Aqua Teen Hunger Force episode "MC Pee Pants" by MC Chris
