= I Want Candy (album) =

Compilation album by Bow Wow Wow
- Released: August 1982
- Recorded: 1981–1982
- Genre: New wave
- Length: 32:48
- Label: RCA Victor
- Producers: Ritchie Cordell; Kenny Laguna; Brian Tench; Colin Thurston

Bow Wow Wow chronology
Teenage Queen (1982)	I Want Candy (1982)	Original Recordings (1982)

Professional ratings
Review scores
Source	Rating
AllMusic	4/5 stars
Christgau's Record Guide	B−
The Rolling Stone Album Guide	2/5 stars
Smash Hits	7/10

I Want Candy is an overseas compilation album by English new wave band Bow Wow Wow, released in August 1982 by RCA Records. Side one of the album consists of all four tracks from Bow Wow Wow's EP The Last of the Mohicans, and the band's hit "Baby, Oh No"; these tracks were produced by Kenny Laguna of Joan Jett & the Blackhearts fame. Side two consists of four tracks from Bow Wow Wow's debut album See Jungle! See Jungle! Go Join Your Gang Yeah, City All Over! Go Ape Crazy!, and "El Boss Dicho", the B-side to the single "Go Wild in the Country".

Though RCA had previously issued The Last of the Mohicans in the United States, the label wished to release a full-length album to capitalize on the American success of the music video for the band's single "I Want Candy" on MTV. I Want Candy peaked at number 123 on the US Billboard 200.

The cover photograph, a nude image of lead singer Annabella Lwin painted gold, was taken by Jim Varriale. The photograph was later reversed for the cover of the 2008 compilation album Love, Peace & Harmony – The Best of Bow Wow Wow.

I Want Candy is also the name of the UK edition - with four extra tracks - of EMI's Twelve Original Recordings compilation of the band, which reached 26 on the UK album chart, as well as a 2003 two-disc Bow Wow Wow anthology from Castle Music's Sanctuary Records, and a 2007 three-track EP on Cleopatra Records, which also contained a cover of the Smiths' "I Started Something I Couldn't Finish".

== Track listing ==
All tracks are written by Matthew Ashman, David Barbarossa, Leigh Gorman and Malcolm McLaren, except where noted.

Side one
No.	Title	Writer(s)	Producer(s)	Length
1.	"I Want Candy"	Bert Berns, Bob Feldman, Jerry Goldstein, Richard Gottehrer	Kenny Laguna	2:43
2.	"Baby, Oh No"	Ashman, Barbarossa, Gorman, Annabella Lwin	Laguna; Ritchie Cordell	2:44
3.	"Louis Quatorze"		Laguna	2:48
4.	"Cowboy"	Ashman, Barbarossa, Gorman, Pierre Grillet, McLaren, (Note: Uncredited on I Want Candy, but credited on original release on The Last of the Mohicans) Stephane Pietri	Laguna	3:30
5.	"Mile High Club"		Laguna	3:26

Side two
No.	Title	Writer(s)	Producer(s)	Length
6.	"Go Wild in the Country"		Brian Tench	5:21
7.	"Jungle Boy"		Tench	5:12
8.	"El Bosso Dicho"	Ashman, Barbarossa, Gorman	Tench	2:10
9.	"(I'm a) T.V. Savage"		Colin Thurston	2:35
10.	"King Kong"		Thurston	2:18
Total length:				32:48

== Charts ==
Chart (1982)	Peak position
Australian Albums (Kent Music Report)	88
US Billboard 200	123
