= Baby, Oh No =

Single by Bow Wow Wow

from the album I Want Candy
- B-side: "Cowboy" (7-inch); "Baby, Oh No" (7-inch version, 12-inch)
- Released: 1982
- Genre: New wave
- Length: 2:44
- Label: RCA
- Songwriter(s): Dave Barbarossa; Leigh Gorman; Matthew Ashman
- Producer(s): Kenny Laguna; Mark Dodson

Bow Wow Wow singles chronology
"Louis Quatorze" (1982)	"Baby, Oh No" (1982)	"Go Wild In The Country" (1982)

"Baby, Oh No" is a 1982 single by English new wave band Bow Wow Wow from their 1982 compilation album I Want Candy. The single peaked at No. 58 on the Billboard dance/disco chart in the same year, and also “Bubbled Under” the Hot 100 at No. 103. In addition, the single was accompanied by a motorcyclist, bedroom, and live show themed music video which had some airplay on MTV. The song has also been mentioned in the books, "Pocket DJ", "Life and Death on the New York Dance Floor, 1980-1983", and "All Music Guide to Rock: The Definitive Guide to Rock, Pop, and Soul"
