= Annabella Lwin =

English-Burmese singer (born 1966)

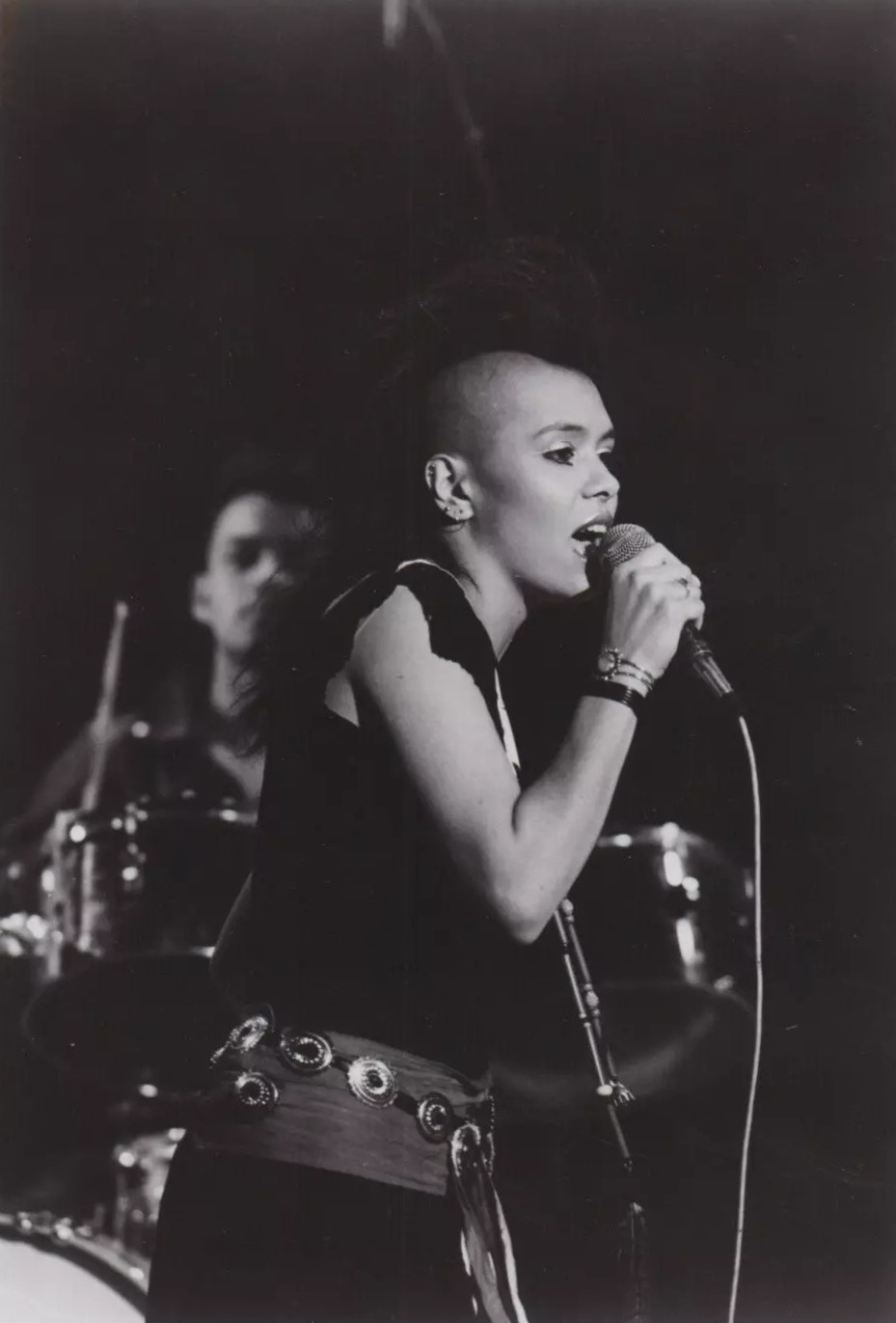
- Lwin performing with Bow Wow Wow in Kant-Kino, Berlin in 1982

Background information
- Born: Myat Myat Aye; 31 October 1966 (age 60); Rangoon, Burma
- Origin: London, England
- Genres: Alternative rock; new wave; pop
- Occupations: Singer; songwriter; record producer
- Instruments: Vocals; tambourine
- Years active: 1980–present
- Labels: RCA; Secret
- Member of: Bow Wow Wow
- Website: annabellalwin.com

Annabella Lwin (born Myat Myat Aye, Burmese: မြတ်မြတ်အေး, MLCTS: myat myat e:, 31 October 1966) is an English-Burmese singer, songwriter and record producer best known as the lead vocalist of the new wave band Bow Wow Wow.

== Early life, family and education ==
Lwin was born on 31 October 1966 in Rangoon, Burma to a Burmese father and an English mother. She discussed her background and musical roots in depth on the C86 Show, on which she described her introduction to music, saying; 'I listened to singles on the radio, and would record them, and they would make me feel better about myself.' She added, 'I was a shy young girl. My mother was a nurse, she was quite strict. I was a latchkey kid.'

== Bow Wow Wow ==
=== EMI Records ===
After recording Dirk Wears White Sox (1979) as members of Adam and the Ants, Matthew Ashman and David Barbarossa plus new Ants bassist Leigh Gorman (who had replaced Andy Warren since the sessions) were persuaded by former Sex Pistols manager Malcolm McLaren to leave Adam Ant to form a new band under his management. Talent scout Dave Fishel heard thirteen year old Lwin singing along to the radio in a West Hampstead dry cleaners where she worked, and convinced McLaren to audition her. Following her successful audition, he had her transfer from a mixed comprehensive school in London to the Sylvia Young Theatre School.

Bow Wow Wow signed a recording contract with EMI Records in July 1980, and released their first single, "C·30 C·60 C·90 Go!", shortly afterwards. Originally only released on cassette, it was the world's first-ever cassette single. EMI did not promote the cassingle due to lyrics ("Off the radio I get constant flow/Hit it, pause it, record and play/Turn it, rewind and rub it away") that promoted home taping during an era when music piracy was a hot button issue and the use of cassette recorders to record music from the radio was still a controversial practice. The B-side, "Sun, Sea and Piracy", also promoted home taping, then lying on a beach and enjoying the fruits of this labour. Both tracks were on side 1 of the tape, making the second side blank, apparently so that the listener could record music of their own liking.

=== RCA Records ===
When Bow Wow Wow moved to RCA Records, controversy followed them over to their new label. The album cover of their debut studio album, See Jungle! See Jungle! Go Join Your Gang Yeah, City All Over! Go Ape Crazy! (1981) depicted the band recreating Édouard Manet's Le Déjeuner sur l'herbe (1863), with a then fourteen-year-old Lwin posing nude. Photographed by Andy Earl, the cover caused outrage that led to an investigation by Scotland Yard, instigated by Lwin's mother. Undeterred, the band used the same photo on the cover of their follow-up extended play (EP) The Last of the Mohicans (1982), and the sleeve of the "Go Wild in the Country" single. This picture is now part of the National Portrait Gallery collection.

Another nude photo of Lwin was used for the cover of I Want Candy less than a year later. The title track, a cover of the Strangeloves' 1965 hit, was originally on The Last of the Mohicans. The single reached No. 9 in the UK singles chart in June 1982.

At the behest of Ashman, Lwin began writing for Bow Wow Wow's follow up, When the Going Gets Tough, the Tough Get Going. When the Going Gets Tough, the Tough Get Going contained the hit "Do You Wanna Hold Me?", which received heavy rotation on MTV.

During a hiatus following an intense US tour, Lwin was suddenly fired from the band in September 1983. She found out about her firing by reading it in NME.

=== Reunion to the present ===
Lwin and former Bow Wow Wow bassist Leigh Gorman reunited in 1997 for a US tour. The reunion included appearances by a range of musicians from the young up and coming, such as Eshan Khadaroo of Beat Kitchen, (Blue Man Group), and the established, including Adrian Young of No Doubt, both playing drums in place of original member David Barbarossa. The original guitarist of Bow Wow Wow, Matthew Ashman, had died of complications from diabetes in 1995, and various guitarists filled in. The tour began in December 1997, and ended in March 1998. Two shows, the 10 January 1998 show at the Bluebird Theater in Denver, Colorado, and the 7 March 1998 show at the Drama Club in Santa Fe, New Mexico, were used for a live CD, Wild in the U.S.A. on Cleopatra Records.

In 1998, Bow Wow Wow collaborated with DJ Swedish Egil on the track "Eastern Promise", released as part of Egil's Groove Radio Presents: Alternative Mix CD on Priority Records. They contributed the song "A Thousand Tears" to the 1999 film Desperate but Not Serious (retitled Reckless + Wild in the US), starring Christine Taylor and Claudia Schiffer, and appeared in the film.

In 2006, Bow Wow Wow recorded a cover version of the Smiths' "I Started Something I Couldn't Finish", which appeared on three 2007 releases: a new three-track I Want Candy EP (Cleopatra), compilation album Stop Me If You Think You've Heard This One Before: A Tribute to the Smiths (Cleopatra) and the Blood & Chocolate: Original Motion Picture Soundtrack (Lakeshore Records).

On 21 November 2010, the 15th anniversary of Ashman's death, Barbarossa joined Lwin and Gorman at the Scala in London in a tribute concert for Ashman. The show was headlined by Adam Ant, and also featured Ashman's other bands, Chiefs of Relief and Agent Provocateur.

With a new guitarist (Jimmy Magoon) and drummer (Dylan Thomas), Bow Wow Wow played shows in California, US and toured the UK during 2011–2012. In December 2012, Gorman began performing under the name "Bow Wow Wow" with Chloe Demetria of the band Vigilant on lead vocals, and launched a new Bow Wow Wow Facebook page, all of which was done without Lwin's consent. Lwin has continued to perform billed as "Annabella Lwin of the original Bow Wow Wow".

Bow Wow Wow songs "Aphrodisiac", "I Want Candy" and "Fools Rush In" (the latter two remixed by Kevin Shields of My Bloody Valentine) were included on the soundtrack of the Sofia Coppola film Marie Antoinette (2006). Lwin was also the inspiration for how Coppola had lead actress Kirsten Dunst portray the title character. The band performed on 2 November 2006 at the Maritime Hotel's Hiro Lounge in New York City to promote the film.

== Solo and other ventures ==
Lwin has recorded original material as a solo artist, and is a featured vocalist on numerous transatlantic dance tracks with producers/DJs, such as Tony B of Groove Radio, Jason Nevins, and the Utah Saints. Lwin's songwriting also brought her into partnerships with producers such as Guy Chambers and Michael Lattanzi.

Simply calling herself "Annabella", she remained with RCA Records. Her first solo release was the 1985 single "Don't Dance with Strangers", produced by the System. She followed that up with the studio album Fever in 1986. The title track, a cover version of the Peggy Lee-popularized Little Willie John classic, was produced by and recorded with multi-instrumentalist Jim Lea of Slade. Another single from the album, "War Boys", produced by John Robie, spent six weeks on the US Billboard Hot Dance Music/Club Play chart, peaking at No. 28. "Don't Dance with Strangers" and "Fever" were included on The Best of Bow Wow Wow, released on 29 October 1996 by BMI.

In 1989, Lwin formed a new band, Naked Experience, together with Chris Constantinou (Chris De Niro) (bass, vocals, co-writer), Josephine Banham (keyboards, backing vocals), and Chips Chapman (guitar). The group wrote and recorded a large body of material, with some tracks later released under Annabella’s name. The band performed for industry showcases, including one for Sony Records, which led to the release of the single "Do What You Do." Creative and managerial tensions ultimately led to the project being discontinued in 1992. She also collaborated across the Atlantic with seasoned musicians and songwriters such as Billy Steinberg and Ellen Shipley.

In 1994, Sony Soho Square released two singles, "Car Sex" and "Do What You Do", for which she was billed as "Annabella Lwin". "Car Sex" made the Top 10 in the UK Dance Chart, while the re-mixed dance follow-up "Do What You Do" (1995), produced by Steve Lironi, spent one week at No.61 in the UK Singles Chart. In 1999, Cleopatra released Virgin Voices: A Tribute to Madonna, Volume One. It contained a cover version of "Like a Virgin" credited to "Annabella Lwin of Bow Wow Wow".

In 2005, Lwin was a featured vocalist, with Camp Freddy members Dave Navarro and Billy Morrison, during a fund raising concert for victims of the tsunami caused by the 2004 Indian Ocean earthquake and tsunami. Lwin co-wrote and co-produced a solo song with record producer Carey Beare, which was donated exclusively to the Hands and Hearts Organization for Tsunami Relief in spring 2006.

Amongst a couple of her own shows in 2010, Lwin appeared on stage with Kathy Valentine and Charlotte Caffey (the Go-Go's), Billy Corgan (the Smashing Pumpkins), and other prominent artists for a MusiCares Musicians Assistance Program (MAP) Benefit concert called 'Women in Recovery', as well as participating in animal charity related concerts.

On 10 July 2012, Lwin released Super Boom on Secret Records. It was a fourteen-track collection of unreleased demo and studio recordings from 1984 through to 1987. In 2016, she released a new EP, entitled Willow Tree, on which she wrote all four tracks. Later in the year, she contributed a cover version of "Cheer Up" to One Heart: A Tribute to Bob Marley & the Wailers, a benefit for teenagers and young adults with cancer or who are living in difficult circumstances.

== Personal life ==
Lwin is a practising Soka Gakkai International Buddhist. She resides in Los Angeles, California.

== Discography ==
=== With Bow Wow Wow ===
- Your Cassette Pet (1980)
- See Jungle! See Jungle! Go Join Your Gang Yeah, City All Over! Go Ape Crazy! (1981)
- The Last of the Mohicans (1982)
- Teenage Queen (1982)
- I Want Candy (1982)
- Original Recordings (1982)
- When the Going Gets Tough, the Tough Get Going (1983)
- The Best of Bow Wow Wow (Receiver Records Limited) (1989)
- Girl Bites Dog: Your Compact Disc Pet (1993)
- Go Wild, The Best of (1993)
- Aphrodisiac... Best of (1996)
- The Best of Bow Wow Wow (RCA Records) (1996)
- Live in Japan (1997)
- Wild in the U.S.A. (1998)
- I Want Candy – Anthology (2003)
- We Are the '80s (2006)
- I Want Candy (EP) (2007)
- Love, Peace & Harmony – The Best of Bow Wow Wow (2008)
- Mile High Club Live (2009)
- John Peel Session (20 October 1980) (2011)
- Your Box Set Pet (The Complete Recordings 1980–1984) (2018)

=== Solo ===
- Fever (1986)
- Super Boom!! (2012)
- Willow Tree (2016)
