= Go Wild in the Country =

Single by Bow Wow Wow

from the album See Jungle! See Jungle! Go Join Your Gang Yeah, City All Over! Go Ape Crazy!
- B-side: "El Boss Dicho!"
- Released: January 1982
- Recorded: 1981
- Genre: New wave
- Length: 2:53
- Label: RCA
- Songwriters: Dave Barbarossa; Leigh Gorman; Malcolm McLaren; Matthew Ashman
- Producer: Brian Tench

Bow Wow Wow singles chronology
"W.O.R.K. (N.O. Nah, No No My Daddy Don't)" (1981)	"Go Wild in the Country" (1982)	"I Want Candy" (1982)

Official audio
- "Go Wild in the Country" on YouTube

"Go Wild in the Country" is a single by British new wave band Bow Wow Wow from their album See Jungle! See Jungle! Go Join Your Gang Yeah, City All Over! Go Ape Crazy!. Released in January 1982 by RCA Records, "Go Wild in the Country" peaked at number seven on the UK Singles Chart.

== Composition ==
"Go Wild in the Country" was written by Malcolm McLaren with band members Matthew Ashman, Dave Barbarossa and Leigh Gorman. Produced by Brian Tench, it was Bow Wow Wow's first single not to be produced by McLaren.

== Release ==
The January 1982 release of "Go Wild in the Country" coincided with McLaren's "Nostalgia of Mud" phase, in which he intended "to show in clothes and music that, in the post-industrial age, the roots of our culture lie in primitive societies". Its lyrics convey many of the themes of this ideology, with references to disdain for town life, lonely streets and takeaway food, and a desire to go "wild in the country/where snakes in the grass are absolutely free".

Bow Wow Wow made their first appearance on Top of the Pops on 11 February 1982, performing "Go Wild in the Country", with lead singer Annabella Lwin debuting her trademark Mohican hairstyle. The song remained on the UK Singles Chart for 13 weeks, peaking at No. 7. The B-side was the instrumental "El Boss Dicho!"

== Chart performance ==
Chart (1982)	Peak position
Ireland (IRMA)	11
UK Singles (The Official Charts Company	7

== Cover ==
The single sleeve featured the band's recreation of Édouard Manet’s Le Déjeuner sur l'herbe. The photograph, taken by Andy Earl, caused controversy when it was originally used for the cover of See Jungle! See Jungle! Go Join Your Gang Yeah, City All Over! Go Ape Crazy!, as Lwin was just 14 years old at the time of the album's release. The image was re-used for their follow-up EP The Last of the Mohicans, and in 2003 for the Castle Music two-disc anthology, I Want Candy.
