= Le Déjeuner sur l'herbe =

Painting by Édouard Manet

- The Luncheon on the Grass (English)
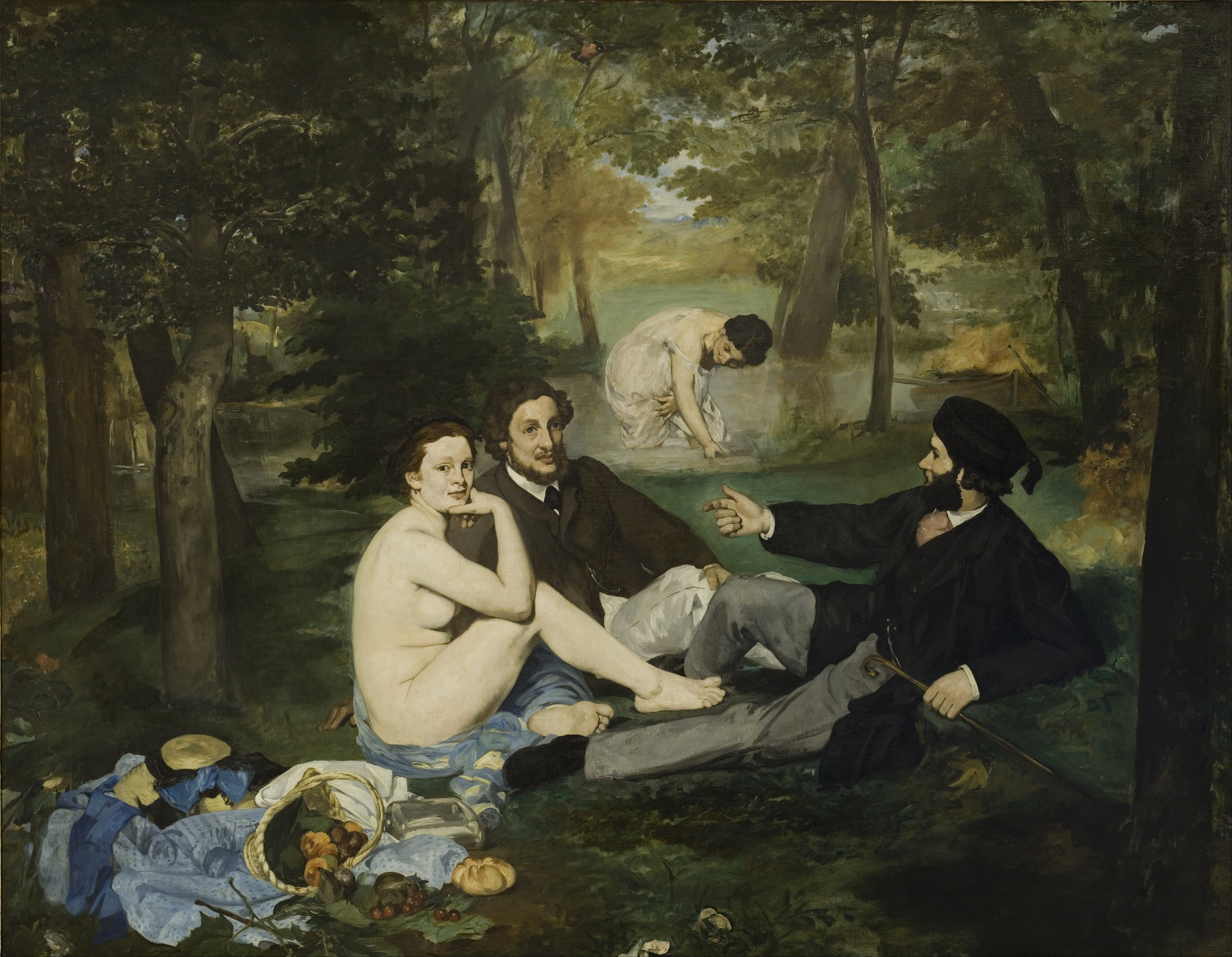
- Artist: Édouard Manet
- Year: 1863
- Medium: Oil on canvas
- Dimensions: 208 cm × 264.5 cm (81.9 in × 104.1 in)
- Location: Musée d'Orsay, Paris
- Accession: RF 1668
- Website: www.musee-orsay.fr/en/artworks/le-dejeuner-sur-lherbe-904

Le Déjeuner sur l'herbe (French: [lə deʒœne syʁ lɛʁb, -ʒøn-]; The Luncheon on the Grass) – originally titled Le Bain (The Bath) – is a large oil on canvas painting by Édouard Manet created in 1862 and 1863.

It depicts a nude woman and a scantily dressed bathing woman on a picnic with two fully dressed men in a rural setting. Rejected by the Salon jury of 1863, Manet seized the opportunity to exhibit this and two other paintings in the 1863 Salon des Refusés, where the painting sparked public notoriety and controversy. The work increased Manet's fame; in spite of this it failed to sell at its debut.

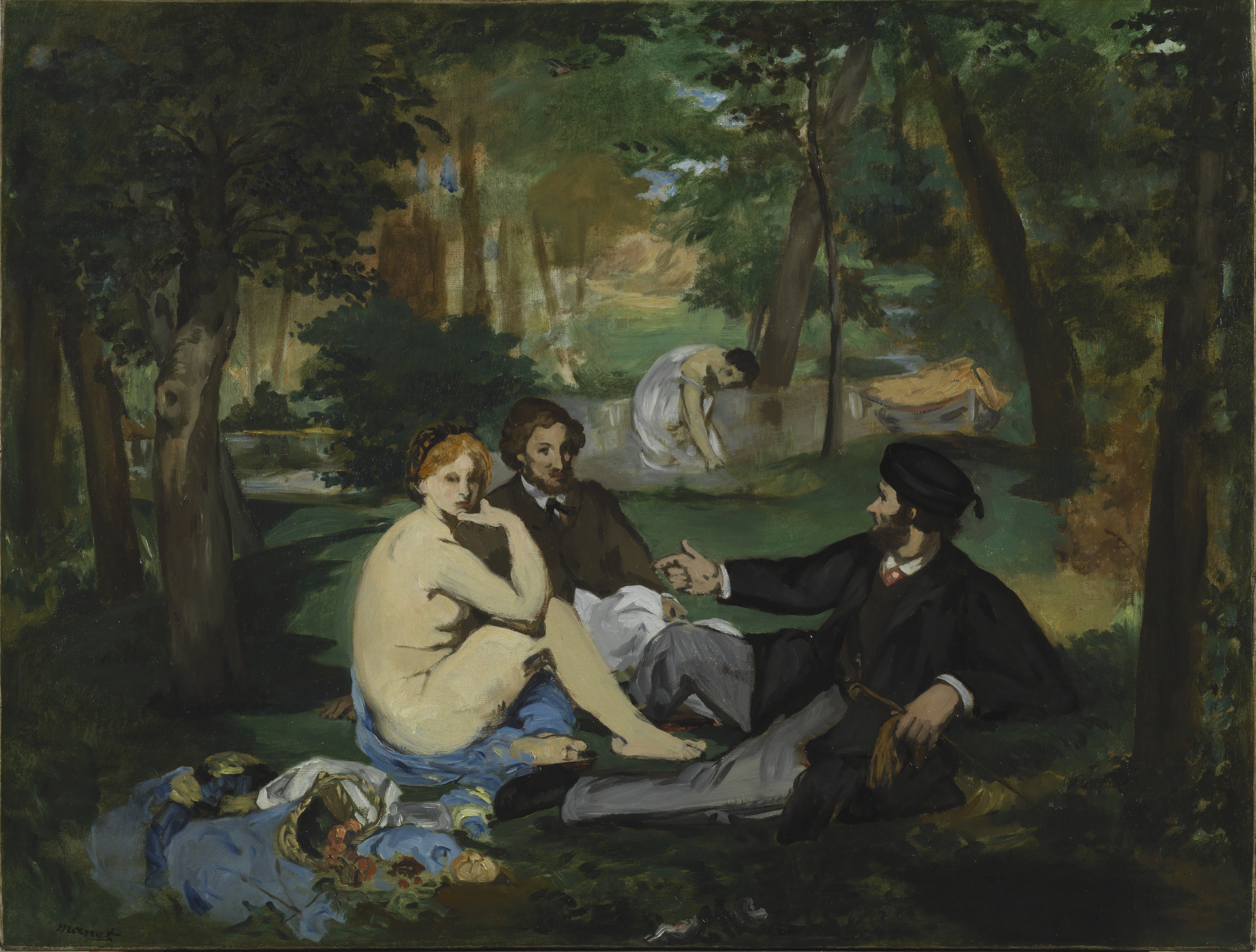
Édouard Manet – Déjeuner sur l'herbe (earlier version at the Courtauld)

The work is in the Musée d'Orsay in Paris. A smaller, earlier version can be seen at the Courtauld Gallery, London.

== Description and context ==
The painting features a nude woman casually lunching with two fully dressed men. Her body is starkly lit and she stares directly at the viewer. The two men, dressed as young dandies, sit with her. In front of them, the woman's clothes, a basket of fruit, and a round loaf of bread are displayed, as in a still life. In the background, out of scale in comparison with the figures in the foreground, a lightly clad woman bathes in a stream. Both the woman and the trees in the background are also painted in a rougher style than the crisp figures in the foreground. The man on the right wears a flat hat with a tassel, a kind normally worn indoors.

Despite the mundane subject, Manet deliberately chose a large canvas size, measuring 81.9 × 104.1 in (208 by 264.5 cm), normally reserved for historical, religious and mythological subjects. The style of the painting breaks with the academic traditions of the time. He did not try to hide the brush strokes; the painting even looks unfinished in some parts of the scene. The nude is also starkly different from the smooth, flawless figures of Cabanel or Ingres.

A nude woman casually lunching with fully dressed men was an affront to audiences' sense of propriety, though Émile Zola, a contemporary of Manet's, argued that this was not uncommon in paintings found in the Louvre. Zola also felt that such a reaction came from viewing art differently from the perspective of "analytic" painters like Manet, who use a painting's subject as a pretext to paint.

There is much not known about the painting, such as when Manet actually began painting it, how he got the idea and how and what sort of preparatory works he did. Though Manet had claimed this piece was once valued at 25,000 francs in 1871, it remained in his possession until 1878 when Jean-Baptiste Faure, opera singer and collector, bought it for 2,600 francs.

== Figures in the painting ==
The figures of this painting are a testament to how deeply connected Manet was to Le Déjeuner sur l'herbe. Some assume that the landscape of the painting is meant to be l'Île Saint-Ouen, which was just up the Seine from his family property in Gennevilliers. Manet often used real models and people he knew as reference during his creation process. The nude woman is thought to be Victorine Meurent, the woman who became his favorite and frequently portrayed model, who later was the subject of Olympia. The male figure on the right was based on a combination of his two brothers, Eugène and Gustave Manet. The other man is based on his brother-in-law, Dutch sculptor Ferdinand Leenhoff. Nancy Locke referred to this scene as Manet's family portrait.

== Interactions of the figures ==
What many critics find shocking about this painting is the interaction, or lack thereof, between the three main subjects in the foreground and the woman bathing in the background. There are many contrasting qualities to the painting that juxtapose and distance the female nude from the other two male subjects. For example, the feminine versus the masculine, the naked versus the clothed, and the white color palette versus the dark color palette creates a clear social difference between the men and the woman. Additionally, some viewers are intrigued by the questions raised by the gaze of the nude woman. It is indeterminable whether she is challenging or accepting the viewer, looking past the viewer, engaging the viewer, or even looking at the viewer at all. This encounter identifies the gaze as a figure of the painting itself, as well as the figure object of the woman's gaze.

== Inspirations ==
As with the later Olympia (1863) and other works, Manet's composition reveals his study of the old masters, as the disposition of the main figures is derived from Marcantonio Raimondi's engraving The Judgment of Paris (c. 1515) after a drawing by Raphael. Raphael was an artist revered by the conservative members of the Académie des Beaux-Arts and his paintings were part of the teaching programme at the École des Beaux-Arts, where copies of fifty-two images from his most celebrated frescoes were permanently on display. Le Bain (an early title for Le Déjeuner sur l'herbe) was therefore, in many ways, a defiant painting.

A further, more specifically compositional reference was identified by the art historian Gustav Pauli in 1908: Pauli demonstrated the persistence within the painting of the figural schema of the Judgement of Paris by Raphael, a lost work known through an engraving by Marcantonio Raimondi. This model, in turn, ultimately derives from antiquity, in particular from two Roman sarcophagi of the second century AD, preserved respectively at Villa Medici and Villa Doria Pamphilj. The poses of the three foreground figures closely correspond to those of the seated figures which, in the ancient reliefs and in the Renaissance engraving, attend the mythological scene. This network of citations demonstrates how Manet – the radical innovator – actually operates though a sophisticated reactivation of the classical tradition. Such a perspective finds resonance in the brilliant formulation by Aby Warburg, who described the artist as a "faithful steward of tradition", capable of receiving and productively reinvesting the legacy of antiquity, transforming inherited models within a fully modern pictorial language.

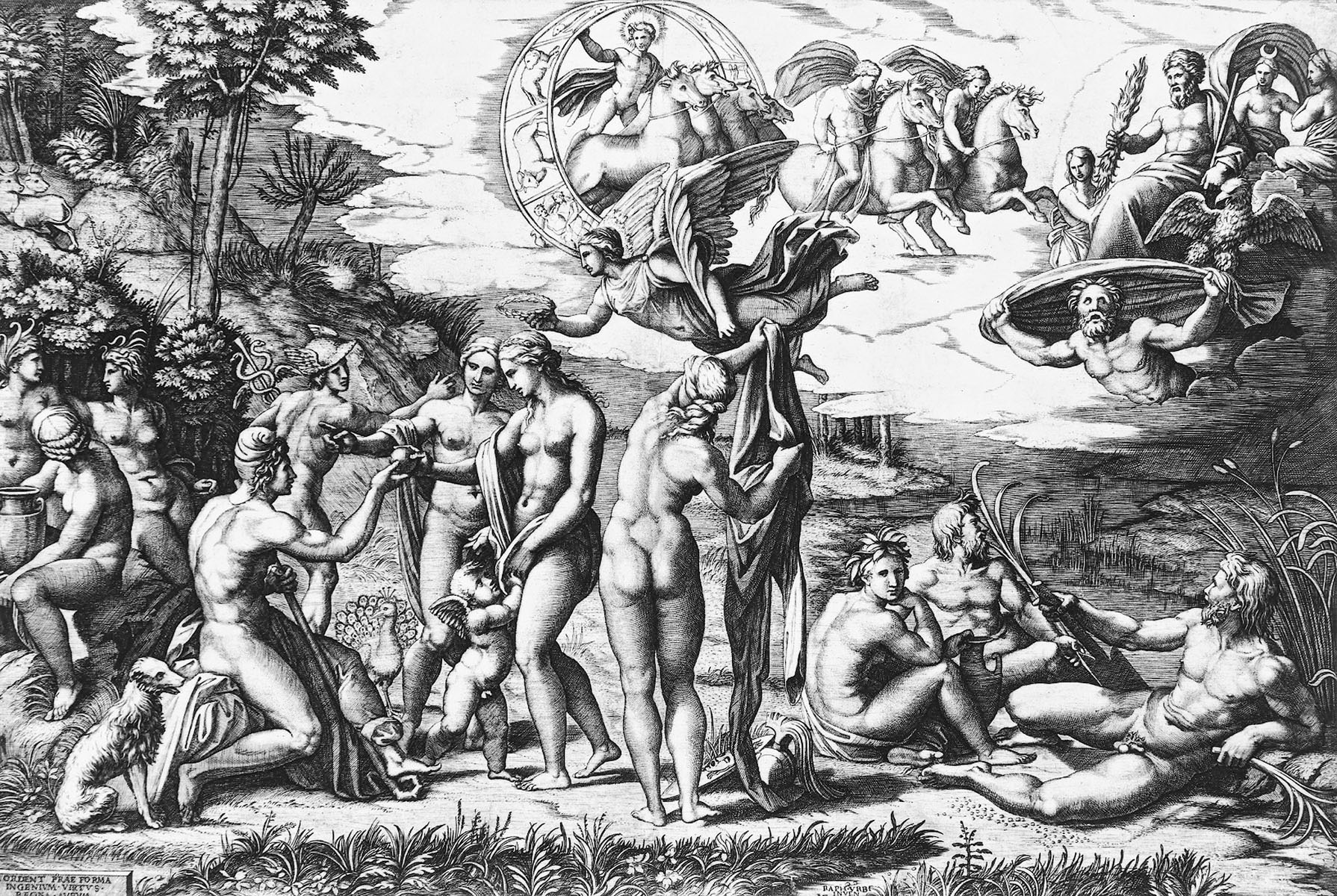
Judgement of Paris Engraving (c. 1515) by Marcantonio Raimondi to a design by Raphael

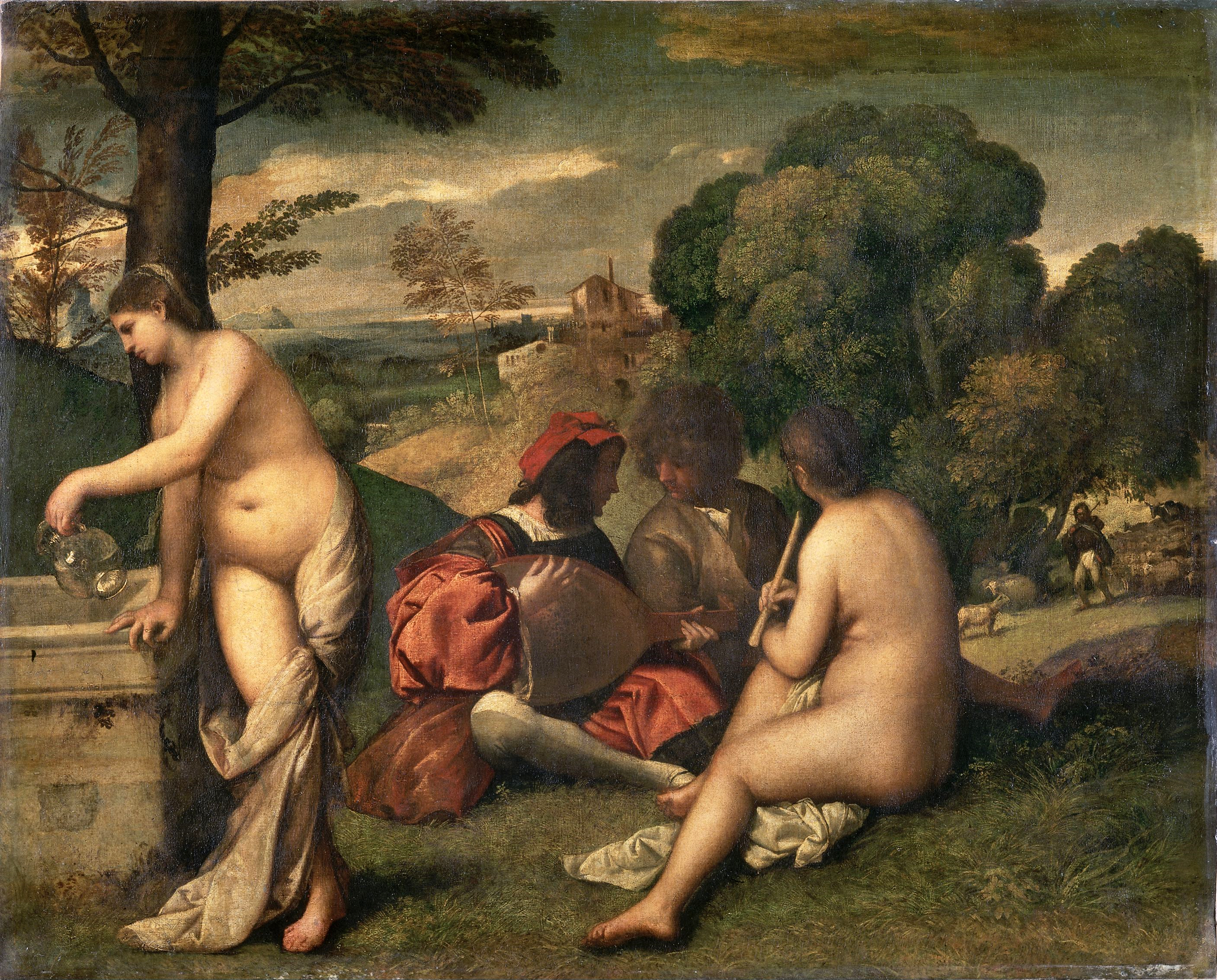
The Pastoral Concert (c. 1510) by Giorgione or Titian, Louvre, Paris, cited as an inspiration for Manet's painting

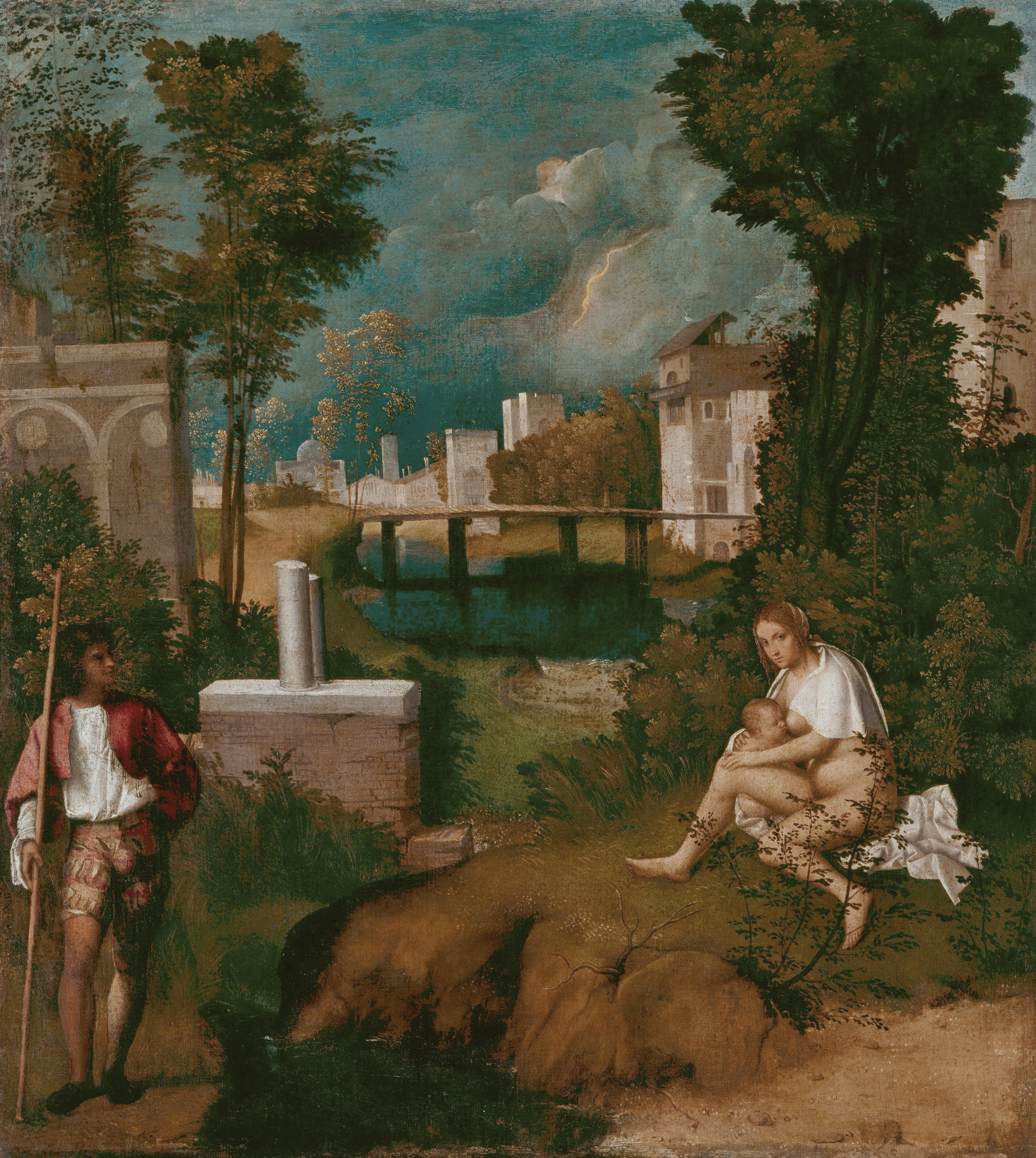
Giorgione, The Tempest (c. 1508), Gallerie dell'Accademia, Venice, Italy

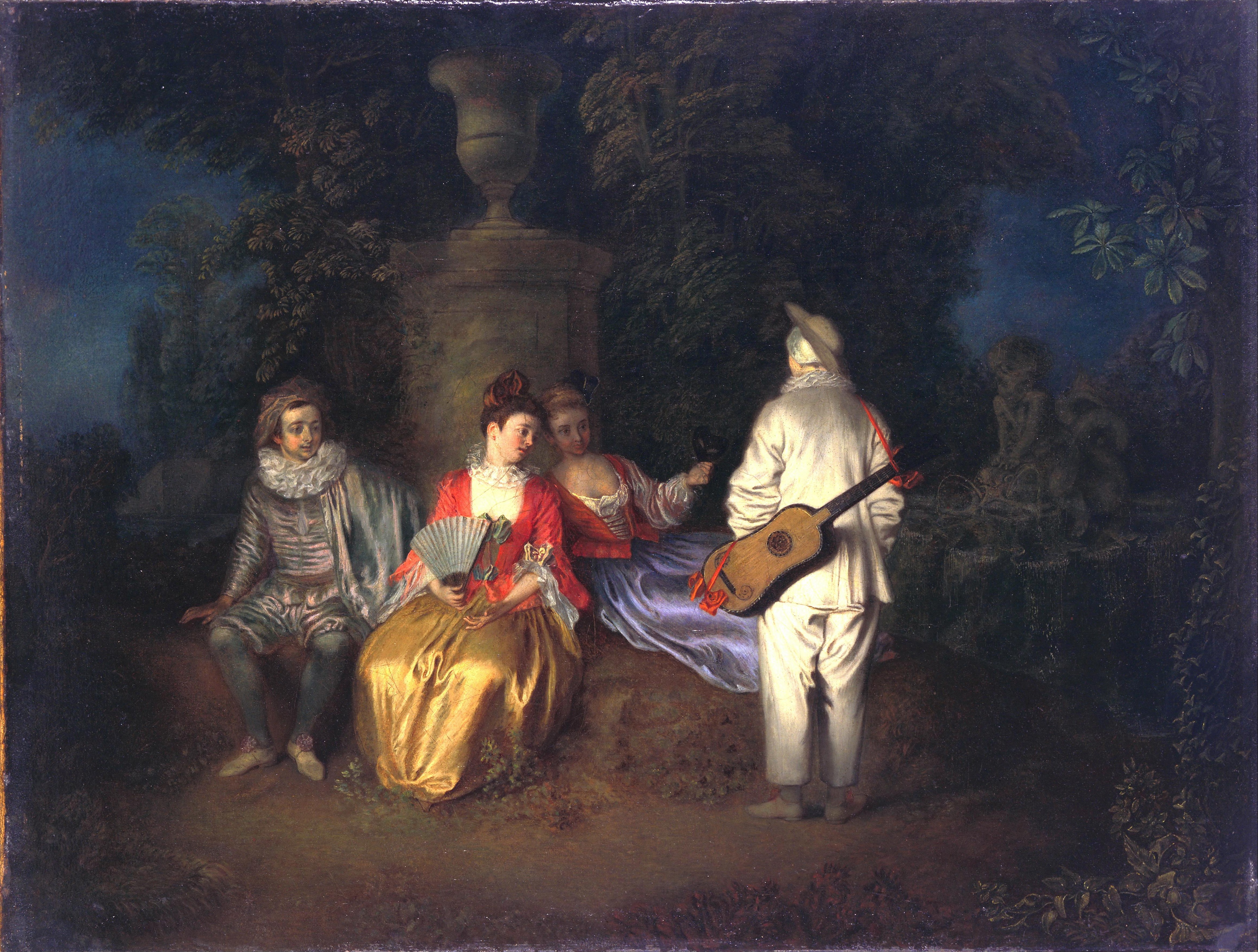
Antoine Watteau, La Partie Carrée, (c. 1713)

Scholars also cite two works as important precedents for Manet's painting Le Déjeuner sur l'herbe: The Pastoral Concert by Giorgione or possibly Titian (in the Louvre) and Giorgione's The Tempest, both of which are famous Renaissance paintings. The Tempest, which also features a fully dressed man and a nude woman in a rural setting, offers an important precedent for Manet's painting Le Déjeuner sur l'herbe. Pastoral Concert even more closely resembles Le Déjeuner sur l'herbe, as it features two dressed men seated in a rural setting, with two undressed women. Pastoral Concert is in the collection of the Louvre in Paris and is likely, therefore, to have been studied by Manet.

According to Antonin Proust, he and Manet had been lounging by the Seine as they spotted a woman bathing in the river. This prompted Manet to say, "I copied Giorgione's women, the women with musicians. It's black, that painting. The ground has come through. I want to redo it and do it with a transparent atmosphere with people like those we see over there."

There may be a connection between Le Déjeuner sur l'herbe and the work of Antoine Watteau. Manet's original title, Le Bain, initially drew the main attention to the woman near the water. This bathing figure alone is quite similar to the figure in Watteau's La Villageoise, as both women crouch or lean over near water, simultaneously holding up their skirts. It is possible that Manet adapted this pose, which is more clearly seen in a sketch of his, years before his creation of Le Déjeuner sur l'herbe.

== Criticism ==
There were many mixed reviews and responses to Le Déjeuner sur l'herbe when it was first displayed and it continues to yield a variety of responses. The initial response was characterized by its blunt rejection from the Paris Salon and subsequent display in the Salon des Refusés. Though many critiques were rooted in confusion about the piece, they were not always completely negative.

- Odilon Redon, for example, did not like it. There is a discussion of it, from this point of view, in Proust's Remembrance of Things Past.
- Le Capitaine Pompilius, a contributor for Le Petit Journal, thought the characteristically "male" colors of the piece brought the countryside into the salon, but thought the painting was underdeveloped.
- Castagnary, appreciator of realist works, identified it as a nice sketch but said it lacked sincerity and lost the definition of the anatomy of the subjects. He also described Manet's painting technique as "flabby".
- Arthur Stevens, contributor for Le Figaro, praised Manet as a talented colorist but felt that he neglected form and modeling in this piece.
- Thoré, Paul, and Louvet loved the energy of the colors but found the brush strokes to be uneven.

One interpretation of the work is that it depicts the rampant prostitution present at that time in the Bois de Boulogne, a large park on the western outskirts of Paris. This prostitution was common knowledge in Paris, but was considered a taboo subject unsuitable for a painting.

=== Criticism of the subject matter ===
- Louis Étienne characterized the painting as a puzzle, while describing the nude female as "a Bréda of some sort, as nude as possible, lolling boldly between two swells dressed to the teeth. These two persons look like high school students on holiday, committing a great sin to prove their manhood."
- Arthur Stevens could not understand what the painting was saying.
- Didier de Montchaux found the subject to be "fairly scabrous".
- Thoré described the nude as an ugly and risqué subject matter, while describing the male on the right as one "who doesn't even think of taking off his horrible padded hat outdoors ... It's the contrast between such an antipathetic animal to the character of a pastoral scene, and this undraped bather, that is shocking."
- Philip Hamerton, an English painter and contributor at the Fine Arts Quarterly, had an affinity for the characteristic photographic detail of the Pre-Raphaelite paintings. Though he did recognize the inspiration from Giorgione, he found Manet's modern realism to be offensive in this situation. His disapproval of Manet and similar artists was related to the idea of indecency behind "vulgar men" painting nude women.

Though the peculiarity of the combination of one female nude with three clothed figures sparked mixed responses, the lack of interaction of the figures in addition to the lack of engagement by the nude woman provoked laughter instead of offense. Anne McCauley claimed that laughter as a response represses the sexual tension and makes the scene rather unthreatening to the viewer in the end.

== Commentary of Émile Zola ==
The Luncheon on the Grass is the greatest work of Édouard Manet, one in which he realizes the dream of all painters: to place figures of natural grandeur in a landscape. We know the power with which he vanquished this difficulty. There are some leaves, some tree trunks, and, in the background, a river in which a chemise-wearing woman bathes; in the foreground, two young men are seated across from a second woman who has just exited the water and who dries her naked skin in the open air. This nude woman has scandalized the public, who see only her in the canvas. My God! What indecency: a woman without the slightest covering between two clothed men! That has never been seen. And this belief is a gross error, for in the Louvre there are more than fifty paintings in which are found mixes of persons clothed and nude. But no one goes to the Louvre to be scandalized. The crowd has kept itself moreover from judging The Luncheon on the Grass like a veritable work of art should be judged; they see in it only some people who are having a picnic, finishing bathing, and they believed that the artist had placed an obscene intent in the disposition of the subject, while the artist had simply sought to obtain vibrant oppositions and a straightforward audience. Painters, especially Édouard Manet, who is an analytic painter, do not have this preoccupation with the subject which torments the crowd above all; the subject, for them, is merely a pretext to paint, while for the crowd, the subject alone exists. Thus, assuredly, the nude woman of The Luncheon on the Grass is only there to furnish the artist the occasion to paint a bit of flesh. That which must be seen in the painting is not a luncheon on the grass; it is the entire landscape, with its vigors and its finesses, with its foregrounds so large, so solid, and its backgrounds of a light delicateness; it is this firm modeled flesh under great spots of light, these tissues supple and strong, and particularly this delicious silhouette of a woman wearing a chemise who makes, in the background, an adorable dapple of white in the milieu of green leaves. It is, in short, this vast ensemble, full of atmosphere, this corner of nature rendered with a simplicity so just, all of this admirable page in which an artist has placed all the particular and rare elements which are in him.

Zola presents a fictionalised version of the painting and the controversy surrounding it in his 1886 novel L'Œuvre (The Masterpiece).

== Inspired works ==
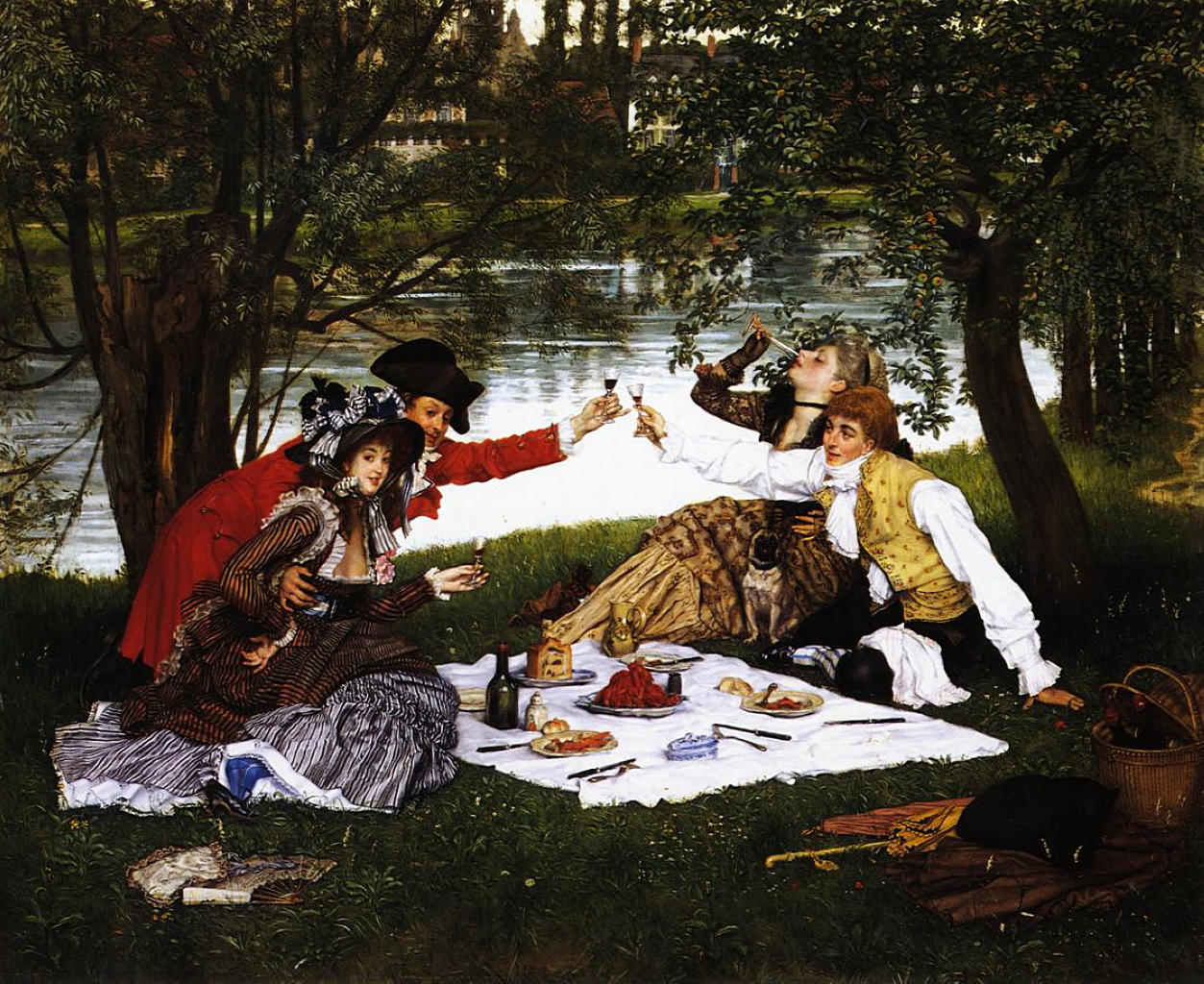
James Tissot, La Partie Carrée, 1870

- In L'Oeuvre, Émile Zola's 1886 novel about a painter, a work by his main character, Claude Lantier, exhibited in a fictional salon des refusés, resembles Manet's painting.

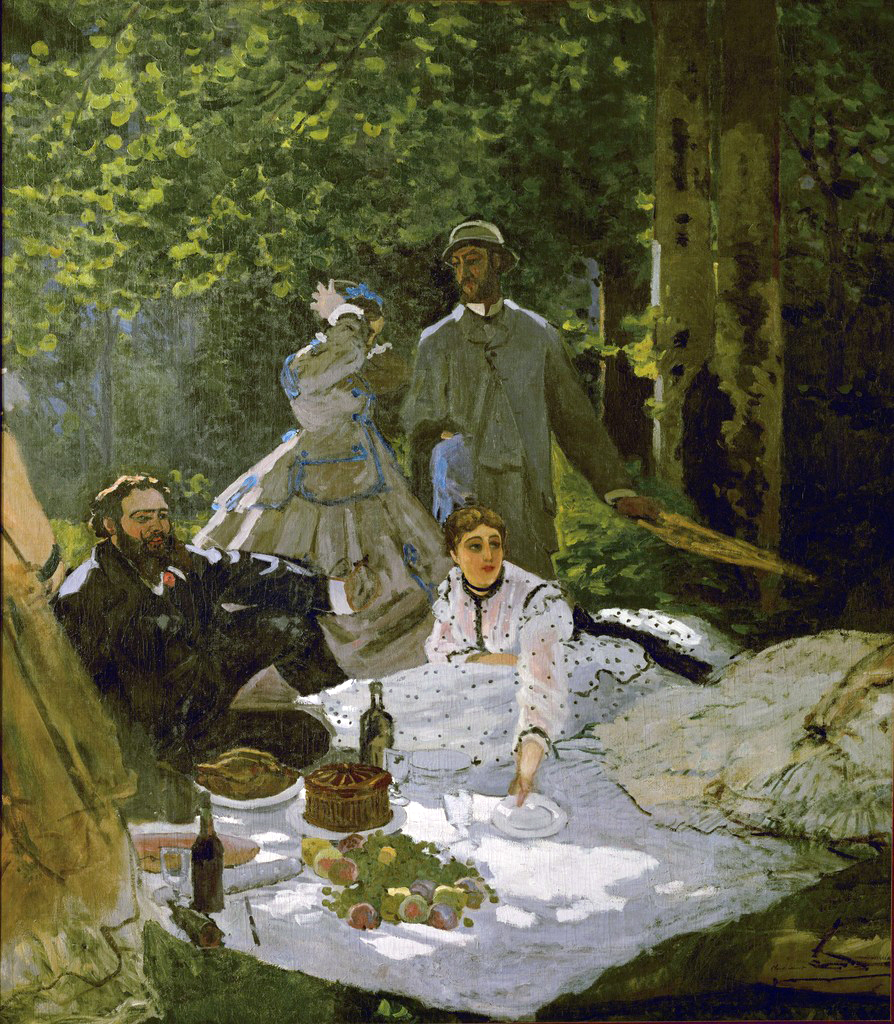
Claude Monet, Le Déjeuner sur l'herbe, 1865–1866, Musée d'Orsay, Paris

- Claude Monet's Le Déjeuner sur l'herbe from 1865–1866 was inspired by Manet's painting. Manet renamed his own painting in 1867, copying the name of Monet's version.
- French painter James Tissot painted La Partie Carrée in 1870, arguably a tamer version of Le Déjeuner sur l'herbe without nudity.

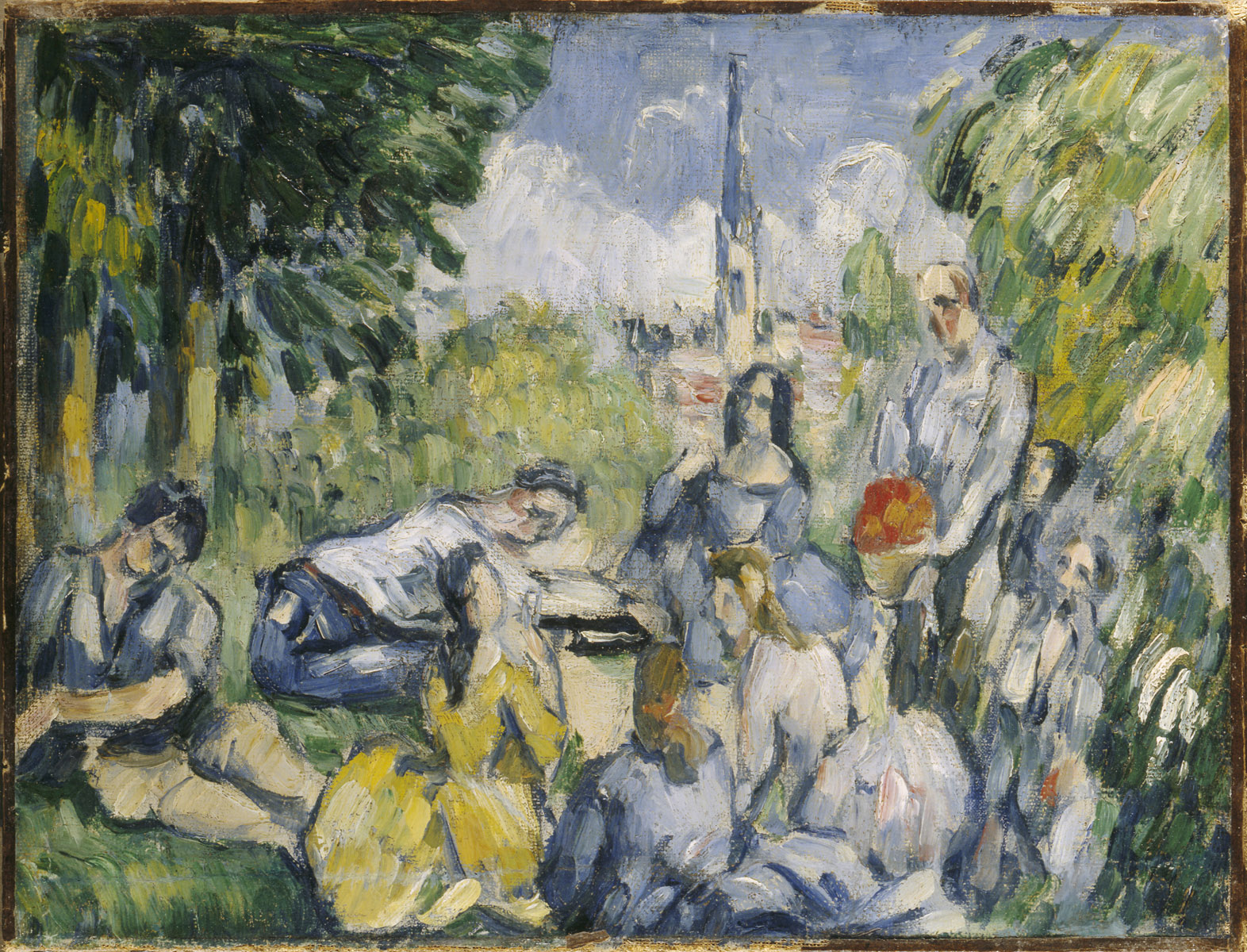
Paul Cézanne, Le Déjeuner sur l'herbe, 1876–1877, Musée de l'Orangerie

- Paul Cézanne painted the same theme in his Le Déjeuner sur l'herbe (1876–1877), Musée de l'Orangerie, Paris. It is not certain, however, that Cézanne was responsible for the title of the work, but it does incorporate many of the same elements of subject in the piece. For example, Cézanne's clothed female subject poses similarly to the model of Manet in which her chin rests in her hand. The male figure, meant to resemble the painter himself, mimics the hand gesture of the man furthest right in Manet's piece. The composition of Cézanne's painting also bears resemblance to Bacchanal (between 1627 and 1628), by Nicolas Poussin, whose works in the Louvre were periodically copied by Cézanne. It is possible that Cézanne's Déjeuner represents nothing more than the joyful memories of outings in the countryside around Aix-en-Provence, known especially from the testimony of a childhood friend of the painter, Émile Zola.

Pablo Picasso, Les Demoiselles d'Avignon, 1907, MoMA

- Manet's painting inspired Picasso as he completed the largest concentration of art prompted by a single work during the 20th century, consisting of 27 paintings, 140 drawings, 3 linogravures and cardboard marquettes for sculpture carried out between 1949 and 1962. In addition, "Picasso exploited the foreground nude again for the masked female on the right in his groundbreaking Les Demoiselles d'Avignon of 1907".
- Paul Gauguin 1897 painting Where Do We Come From? What Are We? Where Are We Going? "includes various references to Manet's picture, the most apparent being the Tahitian girl seated on the right who is based on the Déjeuner's foreground nude".
- Max Ernst painted a parody version of this piece named Le Déjeuner sur l'Herbre in 1944. He inverts the painting, replaces the nude woman with a fish, and adds an 'r' to the title for comedic effect.
- The painting inspired the 1959 film of the same name by Jean Renoir.
- Alain Jacquet copied in 1964 the composition of Manet in his Déjeuner sur l'herbe:, a serie of 95 serigraphies portraying the art critic Pierre Restany and the painter Mario Schifano, one of which was left in the lobby of the hotel Chelsea in New York City for payment of his room.
- Peruvian painter Herman Braun-Vega produced many works inspired by this painting. One of the first, Les invités sur l'herbe, 1970, Musée d'Art Moderne de Paris, is a mix between Las Meninas by Velazquez and Le déjeuner sur l'herbe by Manet, which features Picasso and Velasquez as naked guests. It is a tribute to Picasso who produced both a series of paintings inspired by Le déjeuner sur l'herbe and an other series inspired by Las Meninas. It also is part of a series called Picasso dans un déjeuner sur l'herbe described as "seriously hilarious" by art critic John Canaday. Later Braun-Vega produced other inspired works like Encore un déjeuner sur le sable (1984), where he pictures himself in place of one of the characters. This work, as the following ones, is typical of the syncretism that characterizes the work of Braun-Vega from the 80s. He mixes contemporary characters (mainly South American ones) with Manet's characters, as he does in Cita en el campo and Cita en la Playa in 1985; Fin d'un déjeuner sur l'herbe in 1987 and Picnic en el Patio in 1988; showing critical irony about his time, as in the lithograph I love the neutron bomb (1986). He also moves the scene to Central Park for his 1999 New-York exhibition with Le déjeuner in Central Park (Château Malescasse collection).
- New Jazz Orchestra released the album titled Le Déjeuner sur l'Herbe in 1968. Its cover shows a photograph resembling Manet's painting. Dave Gelly's liner notes for the 2014 CD reissue assert that the cover photograph "was inspired by a Picasso lithograph of the famous Monet painting"; it is not clear if this attribution comes from Gelly himself or one of his sources.
- It was copied in the cover photo of the Bow Wow Wow LP See Jungle! See Jungle! Go Join Your Gang Yeah, City All Over! Go Ape Crazy!, and the EP The Last of the Mohicans. Controversy arose because the naked girl (lead singer Annabella Lwin) was only 14 at the time.
- It was also parodied by Neon Park in the cover of Lowell George's only solo album, Thanks I'll Eat It Here with Marlene Dietrich, Fidel Castro and Bob Dylan as the diners.
- Priit Pärn used the painting as the basis of the 1987 short film Eine murul (Breakfast on the Grass), depicting the day that led to the four subjects of the original painting meeting for their luncheon.
- Mickalene Thomas has produced Le déjeuner sur l'herbe: les trois femmes noires (2010). The painting is both a critique of and reference to Le Déjeuner sur l'herbe. Thomas' piece portrays three bold, black women adorned with rich colors, patterned clothing, and radiant Afro-styled hair; the women's positioning and posing is reminiscent of the subjects of Manet's piece, but the gazes of all three women are fixed on the viewer. Thomas created the painting, her largest piece at the time, in 2010 after being commissioned by the Museum of Modern Art (MoMA) in New York City.
- Gilbert Shelton parodied it for the cover of The Fabulous Furry Freak Brothers comic #3.
- The Simpsons, in their Season 1, Episode 11 episode "The Crepes of Wrath", used it as a backdrop to introduce Bart's foreign exchange visit to France, along with Water Lilies and Japanese Bridge by Claude Monet; Wheatfield with Crows by Van Gogh and Le rêve by Henri Rousseau.
- Dejeuner Déjà Vu–– a life-size 1994 painted bronze sculpture by Seward Johnson–– aimed at replicating Manet's work in the third dimension. The work is located in Grounds for Sculpture in New Jersey.
- In a painting that was the centerpiece of his 2021 exhibition Re:Pose - Subverting the Gendered Gaze in the Historical Nude, artist Stephen O’Donnell re-gendered the figures in Manet’s tableau. In After 'Le Déjeuner sur l'herbe' by Manet the landscape is now peopled by a nude male, an African-American female in men’s attire, and O’Donnell, himself, in a nineteenth-century woman’s riding habit; only the female figure in the background retains its original gender.

== See also ==
- List of paintings by Édouard Manet
