= David Barbarossa =

English musician and author (born 1961)

Dave Barbarossa
- Also known as: Dave Barbe
- Born: 1961 (age 64–65); London, England
- Genres: Alternative rock, new wave, electronic
- Instrument: Drums
- Years active: 1977–present
- Formerly of: Adam and the Ants, Bow Wow Wow, Beats International, Republica, CHANT

David Barbarossa (born 1961, also known as Dave Barbe) is an English musician and author. As the drummer in both Adam and the Ants and Bow Wow Wow, he was instrumental in creating the highly influential and innovative tribal drumming style that was popular among British and some American bands from 1979 to 1983.

== Adam and the Ants ==
Barbarossa joined Adam and the Ants in 1977 and was the drummer for their debut album Dirk Wears White Sox. It was released on 30 October 1979 by Do It Records and was the first number one album on the UK Indie Chart when the chart debuted in Record Week in 1980.

Shortly afterward, Adam Ant hired former Sex Pistols manager Malcolm McLaren in the hope of gaining more widespread recognition. Instead, McLaren persuaded Barbarossa, guitarist Matthew Ashman and bassist Leigh Gorman to leave Adam behind, and form a group under McLaren's management. Thirteen-year-old Annabella Lwin joined the group as its vocalist, and the band became Bow Wow Wow.

== Bow Wow Wow ==
Bow Wow Wow signed with EMI Records in July 1980. Their first single, "C·30 C·60 C·90 Go!", for which Barbarossa shared songwriting credit with McLaren, Ashman and Gorman, holds the distinction of being the world's first-ever cassette single. It reached No. 34 on the UK Singles Chart and stayed on the chart for seven weeks, despite its lack of promotion due to lyrics that encouraged music piracy.

In November 1980, Bow Wow Wow released the cassette-only Your Cassette Pet. Likewise, Barbarossa shared songwriting credit with McLaren, Ashman and Gorman on seven of Your Cassette Pet's eight tracks. As it was not available on vinyl, it was eligible only for the UK Singles Chart, where it peaked at No. 58. EMI dropped the group after their second single "W.O.R.K. (N.O. Nah, No No My Daddy Don't)" failed to chart.

After splitting with EMI, Bow Wow Wow signed with RCA Records, and released their first album See Jungle! See Jungle! Go Join Your Gang, Yeah. City All Over! Go Ape Crazy in October 1981. It produced their first UK top 10 hit "Go Wild in the Country" in early 1982. In May 1982, Bow Wow Wow released the four-track EP The Last of the Mohicans, which contained a remake of the Strangeloves' 1965 hit "I Want Candy'. "I Want Candy" was Bow Wow Wow's biggest international hit, due in part to an iconic music video that played in heavy rotation on MTV.

In 1983, Bow Wow Wow released their second album When the Going Gets Tough, the Tough Get Going. The lead single "Do You Wanna Hold Me?" reached No. 47 in the UK, but fared best on the Dutch charts, where it peaked at No. 3. The song reached No. 77 in the U.S.

The group were due to embark on a world tour in support of When the Going Gets Tough, the Tough Get Going, but tensions within the group were rising as the members were suffering from illness and exhaustion after intense touring. After a brief hiatus, Barbarossa, Ashman and Gorman kicked Annabella out of the group, and formed Chiefs of Relief with Ashman as its lead singer.

== Post Bow Wow Wow ==
Barbarossa's stay with Chiefs of Relief proved short lived, and he was soon replaced by former Sex Pistols drummer Paul Cook. After this Barbarossa went into session drumming, and was part of Beats International's ever changing line-up. It was while doing session work that he teamed up with former Flowered Up keyboardist Tim Dorney, Andy Todd, guitarist Johnny Male and Nigerian-born lead singer Saffron to form Republica.

Their debut album Republica was released in July 1996 and reached No. 4 in the UK charts. The single "Ready to Go" peaked at No. 13 on the UK Singles Chart, and "Drop Dead Gorgeous" peaked at No. 7.

He has played for Chicane, Adamski, Gina Birch, Cactus Rain, Driza Bone and is a core member of CHANT, an open source band whose members include Youth and Jon Moss. He played with Adam Ant on his Dirk Wears White Sox Tour of 2014. He also plays drums for Roland Gift of Fine Young Cannibals.

== Mud Sharks ==
In 2012, Barbarossa released Mud Sharks, a semi-autobiographical novel of a teenager growing up in London's punk scene in the late 1970s.

== Mute ==
Barbarossa's second novel, Mute, was released in December 2024, by Astral Horizon Press. It follows the story of Daniel, a young pianist who plays keys in a band, whilst in the throe's of love with a former model. All the while, the megalomania of the band's lead singer, Torin, threatens to derail all they have built. The book was well received by the press, including positive reviews from Record Collector Magazine; "Barbarossa's narrative rocks along, always offering something unexpected and always with the feeling that he's seen it all in real life.", Vive La Rock; "As the story moves along, one can't help but root for the nerdy protagonist." and Louder Than War; "Few musicians manage to pen their own life stories, never mind embarking on a novel, but Barbarossa does it with skill and aplomb.".

== Musical style ==
Barbarossa is a self-taught musician. While he was still with the Ants, Malcolm McLaren gave him music tapes from different parts of the world, and he became fascinated by Burundi tribal drumming. Having emerged from the underground London punk rock scene, he created a highly unique tribal drumming style. Along with Anabella Lwin's suggestive vocals it became the signature of Bow Wow Wow's new wave sound. Gorman & Lwin reunited for the "Barking Mad" tour in 1997-1998. Two shows from this tour were included on the CD Wild in the U.S.A. on Cleopatra Records. In the liner notes, they thank Barbarossa for giving them "the original grooves."

== Personal life ==
Barbarossa lives in London, and his desire not to leave London plays a large part in his non-participation in reunions of Bow Wow Wow. He has four children and has been married twice.

His brother is Gene Barbe, a painter based in Southern France.

Preceded by Paul Flanagan	Adam and the Ants drummer 1977–1980	Succeeded by Jon Moss
Preceded by Dave Ruffy	Adam Ant drummer 1995; With: Dave Ruffy	Succeeded by Hayley Leggs & Johnny Love
