= Matthew Ashman =

British musician (1960–1995)

- Also known as: "Maff"
- Born: Matthew James Ashman; 3 November 1960
- Origin: Mill Hill, England
- Died: 21 November 1995 (aged 35)
- Genres: Punk rock; new wave
- Occupation: Musician
- Instruments: Guitar; keyboards
- Years active: 1970s–1995
- Formerly of: Adam and the Ants; Bow Wow Wow; Chiefs of Relief; Agent Provocateur

Matthew James Ashman (3 November 1960 – 21 November 1995) was an English guitarist with Adam and the Ants and Bow Wow Wow. He died in 1995 after lapsing into a coma due to diabetes, aged 35.

== Adam and the Ants ==
Raised in Mill Hill, Barnet, Ashman attended school alongside Boz Boorer. He was influenced by jazz while learning guitar, and joined his first band, Staffix, after learning Deep Purple's "Smoke on the Water". Staffix opened Glastonbury 77 with a 2 hr set, their own PA and a borrowed generator.

He joined Adam and the Ants after leaving The Kameras in June 1978, playing guitar and singing backing vocals. He toured the UK twice and visited Belgium, Germany and Italy. He played guitar on Adam and the Ants' first single, "Young Parisians" and their debut album Dirk Wears White Sox. It was released on 30 October 1979 by Do It Records. It is the first number one album on the UK Indie Chart when the chart debuted in Record Week in 1980.

Shortly afterwards, Adam Ant hired former Sex Pistols manager Malcolm McLaren, in the hope of gaining more widespread recognition. Instead, McLaren persuaded Ashman, drummer David Barbarossa and bassist Leigh Gorman to leave Adam behind, and form a new group under McLaren's management. Thirteen year old Annabella Lwin joined the group as its vocalist, and the band became Bow Wow Wow.

== Bow Wow Wow ==
Bow Wow Wow signed with EMI Records in July 1980. Their first single, "C·30 C·60 C·90 Go!", for which Ashman shared songwriting credit with McLaren, Barbarossa and Gorman, is the world's first-ever cassette single. It reached No. 34 on the UK Singles Chart and stayed on the chart for seven weeks, despite its lack of promotion due to lyrics that encouraged music piracy.

In November 1980, Bow Wow Wow released the cassette-only mini-album Your Cassette Pet. Likewise, Ashman shared songwriting credit with McLaren, Barbarossa and Gorman on seven of Your Cassette Pet's eight tracks. As it was not available on vinyl, it was eligible only for the UK Singles Chart, where it peaked at No. 58. EMI dropped the group after their second single, "W.O.R.K. (N.O. Nah, No No My Daddy Don't)" failed to chart.

After splitting with EMI, Bow Wow Wow signed with RCA Records, and released their first full-length album, See Jungle! See Jungle! Go Join Your Gang, Yeah. City All Over! Go Ape Crazy in October 1981. It produced their first UK top ten hit, "Go Wild in the Country", in early 1982. In May 1982, Bow Wow Wow released a four-track EP, The Last of the Mohicans, which contained a remake of the Strangeloves' 1965 hit, "I Want Candy'. "I Want Candy" was Bow Wow Wow's biggest international hit, and has lived on as an eighties classic, thanks in part to an iconic music video in heavy rotation on MTV.

In 1983, Bow Wow Wow released their second full-length album, When the Going Gets Tough, the Tough Get Going. The lead single, "Do You Wanna Hold Me?", reached No. 47 in the UK, but fared best on the Dutch charts, where it peaked at No. 3. The song reached No. 77 in the U.S. The single "The Man Mountain" also reached the top 10 in the Dutch charts in 1983.

== Chiefs of Relief ==
Bow Wow Wow was due to embark on a world tour in support of When the Going Gets Tough, the Tough Get Going, but tensions within the group were rising, as the members were suffering from illness and exhaustion after intense US touring. After a brief hiatus, Ashman, Barbarossa and Gorman kicked Annabella Lwin out of the group, and formed Chiefs of Relief with Ashman as its lead singer.

Ashman and Barbarossa co-wrote Chiefs of Relief's first single, "Holiday" b/w "I Don't Mind, She Don't Care", released on MCA Records in 1984. Barbarossa's stay with Chiefs of Relief proved short lived, however, and he was soon replaced by former Sex Pistols drummer Paul Cook. Gorman was also out of the group by the time they released their second single, "Freedom To Rock" b/w "Dream Baby", in late 1985 on WEA. They released their third single, "Weekend" b/w "Kiss Of Life", in 1987. Later in the year, they released a self titled album, which contained none of these tracks, on Sire Records before breaking up.

== Agent Provocateur ==
After the demise of Chiefs of Relief, Ashman spent several years away from the music industry. In 1992, he joined Kevin Mooney's Max, and appeared on the Red Dot Records release, Silence Running. After which, he briefly joined Rams, and appeared on their 1993 debut release, Wrecked on Swiss record label, Sound Service.

The next stop for Ashman was Agent Provocateur, and it was while a member of this band that he died due to complications arising from diabetes on 21 November 1995. They released the album Where the Wild Things Are posthumously in 1997, featuring Ashman on guitar, bass guitar and Vox organ.

== Legacy ==
Ashman was known for his iconic Gretsch White Falcon guitar and applying a spaghetti western guitar twang to Bow Wow Wow's music over Barbarossa's Burundi tribal drumming. Quite a few guitarists have listed Ashman as an influence over the years, including Theatre of Hate-The Cult's Billy Duffy and Red Hot Chili Peppers guitarist John Frusciante. Previously during Adam and the Ants, Ashman used a cherry red Gibson SG with a Marshall amp. The resulting loud "dirty" guitar sound, a staple of live recordings of the early Ants as well as their second Peel Session and recordings for Decca Records, was heavily toned down for the recording of the Dirk Wears White Sox album.

On the fifteenth anniversary of Ashman's death, Adam Ant topped the bill at a tribute concert for Ashman on 21 November 2010 at the Scala in London, in a show also featuring Bow Wow Wow, Chiefs of Relief and Agent Provocateur. Boz Boorer provided guitar for Ant's set. Will Crewdson of Rachel Stamp played Ashman's guitar role for Bow Wow Wow alongside the three surviving classic lineup members; he would later work again as an Ashman substitute alongside Barbarossa and German in Adam Ant's 2014 band on the live DVD album Dirk Live at the Apollo.

Preceded by Johnny Bivouac	Adam and the Ants lead guitarist 1978 - 1980	Succeeded by Marco Pirroni
