= See Jungle! See Jungle! Go Join Your Gang Yeah, City All Over! Go Ape Crazy! =

- Bow Wow Wow's take on Manet's Le Déjeuner sur l'herbe

Studio album by Bow Wow Wow
- Released: 16 October 1981
- Recorded: 1981
- Genre: New wave; post-punk
- Length: 38:55
- Label: RCA
- Producer: Bow Wow Wow; Alan Tarney; Brian Tench; Colin Thurston

Bow Wow Wow chronology
Your Cassette Pet (1980)	See Jungle! See Jungle! Go Join Your Gang Yeah, City All Over! Go Ape Crazy! (1981)	The Last of the Mohicans (1982)

Alternate covers
- The less salacious covers of the US & Australian editions

Singles from See Jungle! See Jungle! Go Join Your Gang Yeah, City All Over! Go Ape Crazy!
- 1. "Chihuahua" Released: 1981; 2. "Go Wild in the Country" Released: January 1982; 3. "Orang-Outang" Released: 1982 (North America only release); 4. "Jungle Boy" Released: 1982

See Jungle! See Jungle! Go Join Your Gang Yeah, City All Over! Go Ape Crazy! (later retitled See Jungle! See Jungle! Go Join Your Gang Yeah! City All Over, Go Ape Crazy) is the debut studio album by the English new wave band Bow Wow Wow, released on 16 October 1981 by RCA Records.

== Release ==
In 1981, after splitting with EMI Records, Bow Wow Wow signed with new A&R head Bill Kimber of RCA Records, and released their first full-length album in October 1981. In support of the album, Bow Wow Wow opened for the Pretenders and the Police in the United States, and in Europe for Queen. In May 1982, they undertook a Japanese tour with Madness.

The album was reissued by Cherry Red Records in 2010 as a two-disc set, retitled See Jungle! See Jungle! Go Join Your Gang / B-Sides. The second disc comprises various non-album tracks, including Bow Wow Wow's most popular single "I Want Candy" and the rare title track of the Teenage Queen EP.

On 25 May 2018, Cherry Red released the three-disc set Your Box Set Pet (The Complete Recordings 1980–1984), which included See Jungle! See Jungle! Go Join Your Gang Yeah, City All Over! Go Ape Crazy! in its entirety on the first disc, plus ten bonus tracks. A 180g green/yellow marbled vinyl pressing limited to 2,000 copies worldwide is to be released on 27 May 2022.

== Cover art ==
The album cover photograph, taken by Andy Earl, depicts the band recreating Édouard Manet's Le Déjeuner sur l'herbe (1863). Posing nude was lead singer Annabella Lwin, who was 14 at the time of the album's release. The cover caused outrage, and Lwin's mother initiated a Scotland Yard investigation of the picture as child pornography, which led to a different cover being used for US releases. When the investigation went nowhere, the image was reused for their follow-up EP The Last of the Mohicans.

The picture taken by Andy Earl is now part of the National Portrait Gallery collection.

== Critical reception ==
Professional ratings
Review scores
Source	Rating
AllMusic	4/5 stars
Christgau's Record Guide	B+
Record Mirror	4/5 stars
The Rolling Stone Album Guide	3/5 stars
Smash Hits	8½/10

See Jungle! See Jungle! Go Join Your Gang Yeah, City All Over! Go Ape Crazy! was described by Tom Demalon of AllMusic as a mix of new wave and dance music, "with a heavy nod toward percussion." V writer Joshua Lyon said that the album saw Bow Wow Wow integrating the "frenetic" drum rhythms of Burundian music into their brand of post-punk and Brazilian-inspired pop. It reached No. 26 on the UK Albums Chart and No. 192 on the Billboard 200, and produced Bow Wow Wow's first UK top 10 hit single with "Go Wild in the Country" (which also used Bow Wow Wow's take on Le Déjeuner sur l'herbe on the sleeve). "Go Wild in the Country" entered the UK Singles Chart in January 1982, peaking at No. 7, and stayed on the chart for 13 weeks.

In his retrospective review for AllMusic, Tom Demalon wrote, "The results are mixed and you sometimes have the feeling that you are hearing the same song repeated. However, it's difficult not to find yourself drumming your fingers to the frantic beats." Trouser Press found that the album showed "artistic growth", noting, "By downplaying the leering football chants, Bow Wow Wow is able to investigate subtler lyrics and rhythms. And fueled by drummer Dave Barbarossa, they pack quite a wallop." Simon Reynolds, in his book Rip It Up and Start Again, praised the record as "charming and witty and altogether captivating, a pop masterpiece", on which the band "achieved a uniquely ravishing sonic identity." In 2016, Vive Le Rock named it one of the 50 greatest new wave albums.

== Track listing ==
All tracks are written by Matthew Ashman, David Barbarossa, Leigh Gorman and Malcolm McLaren, except where noted. Track titles for the original album are adapted from the 1981 UK issue. Production credits for the original album are adapted from the 1981 US issue; the 1981 UK issue credits production on "Elimination Dancing" to Colin Thurston instead of Bow Wow Wow and Brian Tench, and production on "Go Wild in the Country" and "Orang-Outang" solely to Tench.

Side one
No.	Title	Writer(s)	Producer(s)	Length
1.	"Jungle Boy"		Thurston	2:47
2.	"Chihuahua"		Alan Tarney	4:15
3.	"Sinner, Sinner, Sinner"	Ashman, Barbarossa, Gorman, Annabella Lwin, McLaren	Tarney	2:23
4.	"Mickey Put It Down"		Thurston	3:03
5.	"(I'm a) T.V. Savage"		Thurston	2:40
6.	"Elimination Dancing"	Ashman, Barbarossa, Gorman, Lwin, McLaren	Bow Wow Wow; Tench	3:04

Side two
No.	Title	Writer(s)	Producer(s)	Length
7.	"Golly! Golly! Go Buddy!"		Thurston	2:38
8.	"King Kong"		Thurston	2:20
9.	"Go Wild in the Country"		Bow Wow Wow; Tench	2:44
10.	"I'm Not a Know It All"	Ashman, Barbarossa, Gorman, Lwin, McLaren	Thurston	2:54
11.	"Why Are Babies So Wise?"		Thurston	2:55
12.	"Orang-Outang"	Ashman, Barbarossa, Gorman, Lwin, McLaren	Bow Wow Wow; Tench	2:44
13.	"Hello, Hello Daddy (I'll Sacrifice You)"		Thurston	4:28
Total length:				38:55

See Jungle! See Jungle! Go Join Your Gang / B-Sides disc two
No.	Title	Writer(s)	Producer(s)	Length
1.	"Prince of Darkness (Sinner! Sinner! Sinner!)" (Single version)	Ashman, Barbarossa, Gorman, Lwin, McLaren	Bow Wow Wow; Tench	2:22
2.	"El Bosso Dicho"	Ashman, Barbarossa, Gorman	Thurston	2:12
3.	"I Want Candy"	Bert Berns, Bob Feldman, Jerry Goldstein, Richard Gottehrer	Kenny Laguna	2:44
4.	"Louis Quatorze"		Laguna	2:48
5.	"Mile High Club"		Laguna	3:27
6.	"Louis Quatorze" (Re-recording)		Laguna	2:48
7.	"Mile High Club" (Re-recording)		Laguna	3:26
8.	"Teenage Queen"	Bow Wow Wow	Terry Thomas; Kazuo Yoshie	3:23
9.	"Joy of Eating Raw Flesh"	Ashman, Barbarossa, Gorman	Thurston	3:23
10.	"Cowboy"	Ashman, Barbarossa, Gorman, Pierre Grillet, McLaren, Stephane Pietri	Laguna	3:31
Total length:				30:05

== Personnel ==
Bow Wow Wow

- Annabella Lwin - vocals
- Matthew Ashman - guitar
- Leigh Gorman - bass
- Dave Barbarossa - drums

Technical

- Nick Egan - design
- Andy Earl - photography after Édouard Manet's Le Déjeuner sur l'herbe

== Charts ==
Chart (1981–82)	Peak position
UK Albums (Official Charts)	26
US Billboard 200	192
