= Leigh Gorman =

English musician (born 1961)

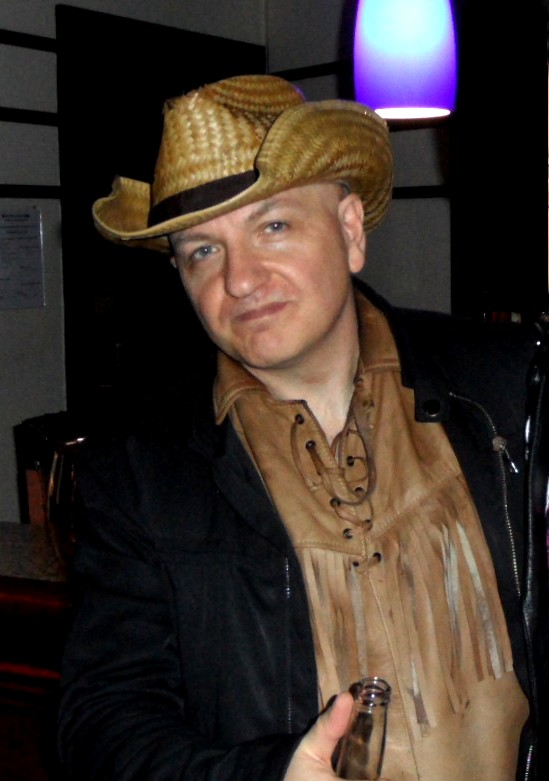
- Gorman in 2012

Background information
- Born: 11 December 1961 (age 64); London, England
- Genres: Rock; new wave
- Years active: 1978–present
- Website: myspace.com/leighgorman

Leigh Gorman (born 11 December 1961) is an English rock musician, record producer, and composer, best known for his work as the bass player for Bow Wow Wow.

== Early life ==
Leigh grew up in the East End of London. He started playing classical guitar at the age of 12. Graduating to the bass guitar two years later, he developed a unique, classically rooted, extremely fast and funky style. Leigh made the acquaintance of Marc Bolan's road manager who gave him free rein to use all of Marc's spare equipment. Leigh was able to play virtually anything he picked up, but he had an affinity for stringed instruments. Aside from mastering classical, flamenco, rock, and bass guitar, Leigh taught himself to play the sitar, bouzouki, mandolin, and keyboards. He started doing session work at 16 and went on to join a band called 57 Men, the first incarnation of which featured vocalist Glenn Gregory (who went on to form Heaven 17). The rest of the band later became Wang Chung.

== Adam and the Ants ==
While gigging around town, Leigh was spotted by Knox of the Vibrators, who asked him to audition for Adam and the Ants. Leigh joined the Ants in November 1979 and Adam Ant, hoping to gain wider recognition, hired former Sex Pistols manager, Malcolm McLaren. But, McLaren had other ideas and persuaded Gorman, guitarist Matthew Ashman and drummer David Barbarossa to leave Adam behind and form a new group under McLaren's management. Thirteen-year-old Annabella Lwin was recruited as vocalist, and the band became Bow Wow Wow.

== Bow Wow Wow ==
Bow Wow Wow signed with EMI Records in July 1980. Their first single, "C·30 C·60 C·90 Go!", for which Gorman shared songwriting credit with McLaren, Ashman and Barbarossa, holds the distinction of being the world's first-ever cassette single. It reached No. 34 on the UK Singles Chart and stayed on the chart for seven weeks, despite its lack of promotion due to lyrics that encouraged music piracy.

In November 1980, Bow Wow Wow released the cassette-only mini-album, Your Cassette Pet. Gorman again shared songwriting credit with McLaren, Ashman and Barbarossa on seven of its eight tracks. As it was not released on vinyl, it was eligible only for the UK Singles Chart, where it peaked at No. 58. When their second single, "W.O.R.K. (N.O. Nah, No No My Daddy Don't)", failed to chart, EMI dropped the group.

Bow Wow Wow signed next with RCA Records and in October 1981 they released their first full-length album, See Jungle! See Jungle! Go Join Your Gang, Yeah. City All Over! Go Ape Crazy. It earned them their first UK top ten hit, "Go Wild in the Country". In May 1982, Bow Wow Wow released a four-track EP, The Last of the Mohicans, which contained a remake of the Strangeloves' 1965 hit, "I Want Candy". "I Want Candy" was Bow Wow Wow's biggest international hit, and has lived on as an eighties classic, thanks in part to an iconic music video in heavy rotation on MTV.

In 1983, Bow Wow Wow released their second full-length album, When the Going Gets Tough, the Tough Get Going. Its lead single, "Do You Wanna Hold Me?", reached No. 47 in the UK, but fared best on the Dutch charts, where it peaked at No. 3. The song reached No. 77 in the U.S.

The group were due to embark on a world tour in support of When the Going Gets Tough, the Tough Get Going, but tensions within the group were rising, as the members suffered illness and exhaustion after intense US touring. Following a brief hiatus, Gorman, Ashman and Barbarossa kicked Annabella out of the group, and formed Chiefs of Relief with Ashman as its lead singer.

== Production and recent work ==
Gorman and Barbarossa left Chiefs of Relief after only a few months. Leigh tried to form a new band with Barbarossa, did some work with Lwin, wrote new songs, did session work, then ultimately turned to producing. In 1989, Gorman's production of Silver Bullet's "Twenty Seconds To Comply" rose to No. 11 in the UK singles chart. The Soho single "Hippychick", which he also produced, went top 10 and topped the dance charts on both sides of the Atlantic. Gorman earned a gold record for his work on the track. He subsequently joined Soho for a US tour and appeared on The Arsenio Hall Show.

In the early-90s, Gorman worked again with Malcolm McLaren, co-writing and producing the Paris album, featuring the voice of Catherine Deneuve. This jazz-influenced album sold well throughout Europe, resulting in an album of Gorman's ambient dance mixes being released. The duo proceeded to collaborate on several high-profile TV commercials and two film scores. Gorman wrote and produced micro-operettas, soundscapes, and hip-hop & soul jams for the small screen for such clients as Coca-Cola, Pepsi, MCI, Nike, Inc. and Renault. In the summer of 1997, his remix of Mr. President's "I Give You My Heart" went Top 10 in the UK dance charts for 3 weeks.

== Bow Wow Wow reunion ==
Also in 1997, Gorman and Lwin reformed Bow Wow Wow and embarked on the "Barking Mad" reunion tour with guitarist Dave Calhoun and drummer Eshan Khadaroo. The tour produced the live CD Wild in the U.S.A. which also included remixes of previous Bow Wow Wow tracks. The tour sparked off a spate of label interest. This demand also prompted Leigh to move to America. Missing the dance world and playing in the live arena, in March 2000, Leigh joined SoCal organic/electronic rave band Electric Skychurch for some live dates. The band achieved notoriety playing sunrise sets at the monthly, infamous ("undisclosed location"), Moontribe's Full Moon Gathering deep in the Mojave Desert.

Gorman and Lwin recorded a new song, entitled "A Thousand Tears", for Bill Fishman's 1999 film, Desperate But Not Serious (retitled Reckless + Wild in the US). Gorman and Lwin also made cameos in this film that starred Christine Taylor and Claudia Schiffer.

In 2003 Gorman and Lwin reformed Bow Wow Wow again with Los Angeles guitarist Phil Gough and Adrian Young of No Doubt on drums to play the Inland Invasion show as part of KROQ-FM's 25th Anniversary celebrations. The band has maintained a frequent small-venue concert schedule through November 2006.

In June 2006 Bow Wow Wow recorded a cover of the Smiths' "I Started Something" for a proposed Smiths tribute record. The recording can be found on iTunes, and it also appears on the soundtrack of the film Blood and Chocolate, and a promo edit of the recording can be heard on Gorman's MySpace page. When he's not on the road with Bow Wow Wow, Gorman lives and works in Los Angeles producing bands (most recently Morrissey and Calahan), doing remixes (including the alternative radio remix of the Meredith Brooks/Queen Latifah duet "Lay Down") and composing music for TV and film (Wimbledon and The Tenants).

With a new guitarist (Jimmy Magoon) and drummer (Dylan Thomas), Bow Wow Wow played shows in California and toured the UK during 2011–2012. In December 2012, Gorman began performing under the name "Bow Wow Wow" new singer Chloe Demetria of the band Vigilant replacing Lwin on vocals. In 2014, actor/musician Zachary Throne (Sin City Sinners) joined the band on guitar. In a 2016 Washington Times interview, Gorman indicated that he was interested in creating new Bow Wow Wow music with this lineup.

Preceded by Andy Warren	Adam and the Ants bassist 1979 - 1980	Succeeded by Kevin Mooney
