= Bow Wow Wow =

English new wave band

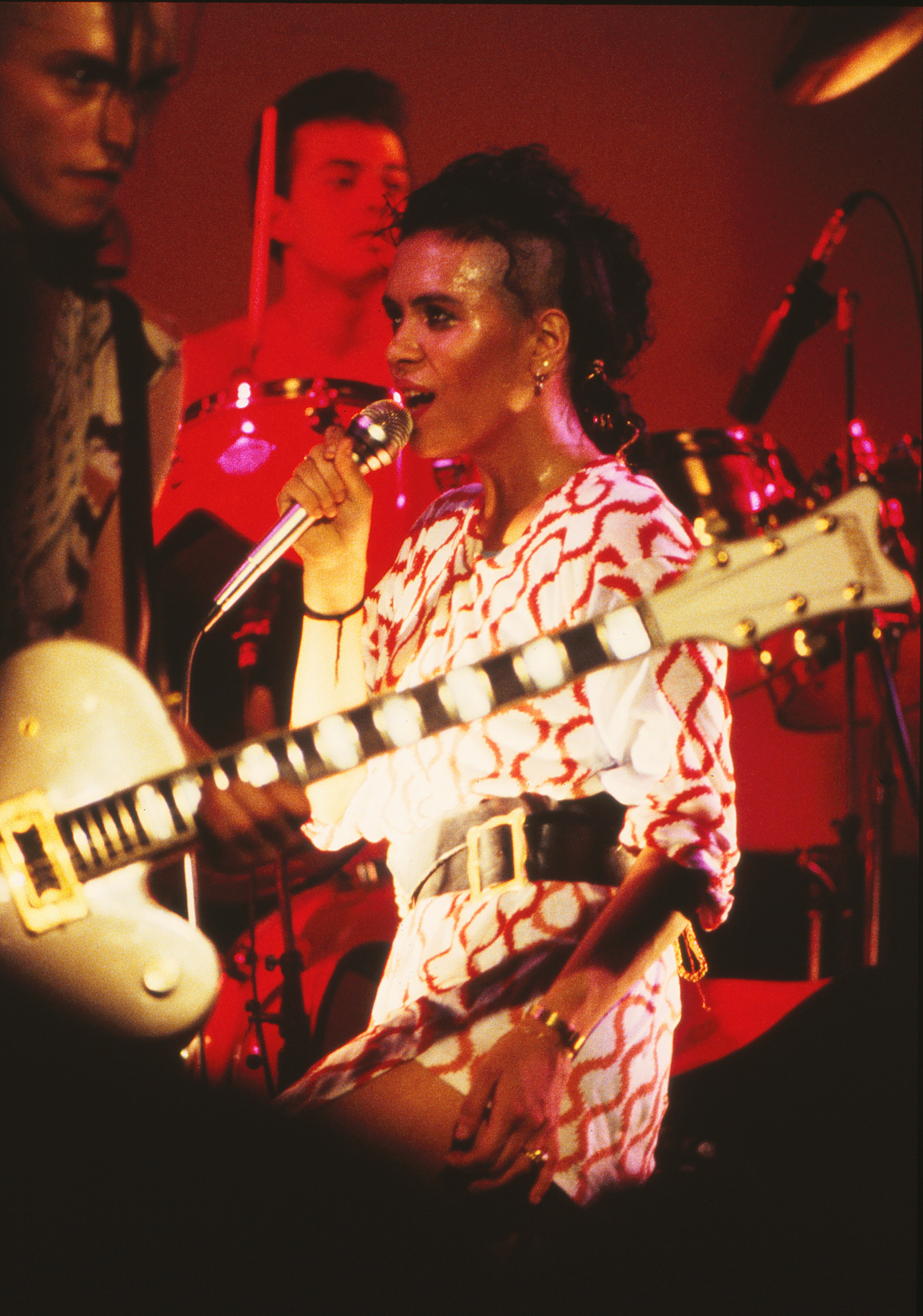
- Bow Wow Wow performing in West Berlin, 1982

Background information
- Origin: London, England
- Genres: New wave; pop; worldbeat
- Years active: 1980–1983; 1997–1998; 2003–2006; 2010–present
- Labels: EMI; RCA; Cleopatra
- Members: Bow Wow Wow Band: Leigh Gorman; Madelyn Feller; Zachary Throne; Les Warner Annabella's Bow Wow Wow: Annabella Lwin
- Past members: Matthew Ashman (deceased); David Barbarossa; Lieutenant Lush; Dave Calhoun; Eshan Khadaroo; Phil Gough; Adrian Young; Devin Beaman; Jimmy Magoon; Dylan Thomas; Chloe Demetria; Matthew Fuller; Lyle Riddle; Sean Winchester; Joń Brooks "Dinzy" Kristen Dinsmore
- Website: Facebook page (Gorman band) Facebook page (Lwin band)

Bow Wow Wow are an English new wave band, created by manager Malcolm McLaren in 1980. McLaren recruited members of Adam and the Ants to form the band with then 13-year-old Annabella Lwin on lead vocals. They released their debut EP Your Cassette Pet in 1980 and had their first UK top 10 hit with "Go Wild in the Country" in 1982. The band's music was characterized by a danceable new wave sound that drew on a Burundi beat provided by Dave Barbarossa on drums, as well as the subversive, suggestive, and sometimes exuberant lyrics sung and chanted by their teenage lead vocalist.

== Formation ==
In 1980, former Sex Pistols manager McLaren persuaded David Barbarossa (also known as Dave Barbe), guitarist Matthew Ashman and bassist Leigh Gorman to leave Adam Ant and form a new group he was managing. The band embarked on a six-month audition process for a lead singer. Talent scout Dave Fishel heard 13-year-old Lwin singing along to the radio at a West Hampstead dry cleaner where she worked, and Fishel persuaded McLaren to audition her. Shortly after Lwin joined the group, McLaren added a second lead singer, George Alan O'Dowd, dubbed "Lieutenant Lush" (in an early version of "Mile High Club", Annabella refers to herself as "Captain Lush"). His stay was short-lived, however; O'Dowd soon formed a new band called Culture Club and went on to stardom under the name Boy George.

== EMI Records ==
Bow Wow Wow signed with EMI Records in July 1980 and released their first single, "C·30 C·60 C·90 Go!" shortly after that. Initially released only on cassette, it was the world's first-ever cassette single (a 7" vinyl version was released several months later). EMI did not promote the "cassingle" due to its lyrics ("Off the radio I get constant flow/Hit it, pause it, record and play/Turn it, rewind and rub it away"), which promoted home taping at a time when music piracy was a hot-button issue. The B-side, "Sun, Sea and Piracy", also promoted home taping, then lying on a beach and enjoying the fruits of this labour. Both tracks were on side one of the tape, making the second side blank, presumably so the listener could follow Annabella's lead. Despite its lack of promotion, "C·30 C·60 C·90 Go!" reached No. 34 on the UK Singles Chart and stayed on the chart for seven weeks.

Bow Wow Wow performed on a Peel Session on 20 October 1980, and in November, they released the cassette-only mini-album Your Cassette Pet. It contained only eight tracks and was not available on vinyl; therefore, it was ineligible for the UK Albums Chart. However, it peaked at No. 58 on the UK Singles Chart. One notorious track from the mini-album was "Sexy Eiffel Towers". It was credited to Ashman, Barbarossa, Gorman, and McLaren and included suggestive moaning and heavy breathing performed by then-14-year-old Lwin. Other controversial tracks included "Louis Quatorze" (which called attention to Lwin's young age), "Uomo Sex Al Apache", and "Radio G-String". All tracks on My Cassette Pet are credited to the four men except "Fools Rush In". McLaren was already renowned for his creative use of provocation to raise public awareness of his projects (and for occasionally taking things too far).

Both "C·30 C·60 C·90 Go!" and Your Cassette Pet ranked among the top 10 "Tracks of the Year" for 1980 by NME. When their second single, "W.O.R.K. (N.O. Nah, No No My Daddy Don't)" failed to chart, EMI dropped the group.

== RCA Records & See Jungle! See Jungle! Go Join Your Gang, Yeah! City All Over, Go Ape Crazy ==
A side by side comparison of Manet's Le Déjeuner sur l'herbe and See Jungle! See Jungle! Go Join Your Gang, Yeah! City All Over, Go Ape Crazy

In 1981, after splitting from EMI, Bow Wow Wow signed with A&R head Bill Kimber at the U.K. division of RCA Records. Their first full-length album was released in October of that year: See Jungle! See Jungle! Go Join Your Gang Yeah, City All Over! Go Ape Crazy! The cover photograph (by Andy Earl) depicted the band recreating Édouard Manet's Le Déjeuner sur l'herbe with a then 14-year-old Lwin posing nude, with her side turned toward the camera and arm and leg positioned to hide explicit content. The cover caused outrage, and Lwin was almost made to quit the band due to the controversy. Lwin's mother alleged exploitation of a minor for immoral purposes and instigated a Scotland Yard investigation. As a result, the band was forbidden to leave the UK until McLaren promised not to promote Annabella as a "sex kitten". Regardless, the photo appeared a second time on the cover of the band's follow-up EP The Last of the Mohicans.

From See Jungle! See Jungle! Go Join Your Gang, Yeah, City All Over! Go Ape Crazy!, Bow Wow Wow scored its first UK top 10 hit with "Go Wild in the Country" in early 1982. The single featured a third appearance of the band's take on Manet's Le Déjeuner sur l'herbe on the sleeve. Around the same time, Bow Wow Wow toured the US, opening for the Pretenders and the Police. The band was set to tour Europe, opening for Queen (who were supporting their dance-oriented Hot Space album), but they were poorly received by Queen's fans and were dropped from the tour before the dates were completed. In May, they toured Japan, supporting Madness.

== The Last of the Mohicans ==
In May 1982, RCA Records released the four-track The Last of the Mohicans, produced by Kenny Laguna and containing their biggest hit single, "I Want Candy". The remake of the 1965 hit by the Strangeloves was featured in an early music video on MTV. The single reached No. 9 on the UK Singles Chart in June 1982. The EP also included a remixed version of "Louis Quatorze", which first appeared on Your Cassette Pet. The Last of the Mohicans peaked at No. 67 on the US Billboard 200, their highest entry on the chart.

Laguna also produced Bow Wow Wow's follow-up single, "Baby, Oh No", the first single from Bow Wow Wow to chart in America (No. 103). The lyrics to the song were later reworked for advertising use by the Japanese cosmetic brand Perky Jean by Shiseido.

== I Want Candy ==
Following the success of the "I Want Candy" music video on MTV, RCA compiled an album, I Want Candy, to capitalize on their newfound American audience. Once again, the cover photo (by Jim Varriale) featured a nude Lwin painted entirely in gold. Side one of I Want Candy contained all four tracks from The Last of the Mohicans and "Baby, Oh No". Side two consisted of four tracks from See Jungle! See Jungle! Go Join Your Gang, Yeah. City All Over! Go Ape Crazy! and "El Boss Dicho", the B-side to "Go Wild in the Country". The album peaked at No. 123 on the Billboard 200.

Meanwhile, EMI reissued all their recordings under the same title I Want Candy. The EMI album matched See Jungle's position of number 26 on the UK album charts. It was released in North America as Twelve Original Recordings and elsewhere as Original Recordings.

== When the Going Gets Tough, the Tough Get Going ==
In 1983, RCA released Bow Wow Wow's second full-length album, When the Going Gets Tough, the Tough Get Going. At the behest of Ashman, Lwin wrote all the lyrics on the album. The cover photography was by David Bailey, and the album credits gave "a kiss" to "Jim" (James Honeyman-Scott) and John Belushi, who had both recently died.

The lead single, "Do You Wanna Hold Me?", reached No. 47 in the UK (the band's last charting single in the UK), but fared best on the Dutch charts, where it peaked at No. 3. With the help of a video in heavy rotation on MTV, the song achieved moderate success in the US, reaching No. 77 on the charts.

The group had planned to embark on a world tour in support of When the Going Gets Tough, the Tough Get Going, but tensions within the group were rising, as the members were suffering from illness and exhaustion after a successful but intense U.S. tour. In September 1983, Lwin was suddenly and unceremoniously fired from the band. She reportedly learned of her ousting by reading it in NME. Shortly after their breakup, they appeared in the 1984 Rob Cohen British-American comedy film Scandalous, performing "Where's My Snake?" and "What's the Time (Hey Buddy)".

== Post-breakup ==
The remaining members formed a new group, Chiefs of Relief, with guitarist Ashman as its lead singer. Their sole album was a 1988 self-titled release issued in the US on Sire Records. Ashman later played with other bands, such as Max and Rams. He was a member of Agent Provocateur when he died (in 1995, at age 35) from diabetes complications. They released the album Where the Wild Things Are in 1997, posthumously featuring Ashman on guitar, bass guitar, and Vox organ.

Barbarossa/Barbe went on to work with other artists, including Beats International, Republica, Chicane, Adamski and Roland Gift of Fine Young Cannibals. He performed live with Adam Ant in 1995, and both he and Gorman toured with Ant in 2014 - thus reuniting the three surviving members of the Ants lineup that McLaren had broken up in January 1980 - for a series of concerts recreating the album Dirk Wears White Sox as part of Ant's band "The Ministers of the New New Super Heavy Punk Funk" with a concert at Hammersmith Apollo in April 2014 (later released as live DVD Dirk Live At The Apollo). Barbe wrote two novels, Mud Sharks and We Were Looking Up.

Gorman went into production after the demise of Chiefs of Relief. In 1989, Silver Bullet's "Twenty Seconds To Comply", which Gorman produced, reached No. 11 on the UK Singles Chart. The Soho single "Hippychick" went top 10 and topped the dance charts on both sides of the Atlantic. Gorman earned a gold record for his work on the track. He subsequently joined Soho for a US tour and appeared on The Arsenio Hall Show.

Gorman worked with McLaren again, co-writing and producing the 1994 album Paris. The jazz-influenced album sold well throughout Europe, resulting in an album of Gorman's ambient dance mixes. The duo collaborated on several high-profile TV commercials and two film scores. Gorman himself wrote and produced music for television spots for clients such as Coca-Cola, MCI, Nike, Inc., Pepsi, and Renault. In the summer of 1997, his remix of Mr. President's "I Give You My Heart" spent three weeks in the Top 10 of the UK Dance Chart. He joined the rave band Electric Skychurch in 2006.

Known simply as "Annabella", Lwin remained with RCA Records, and her first solo release was the 1985 single "Don't Dance With Strangers", produced by the System. She followed up with the album Fever in 1986. The title track, a cover of the Peggy Lee classic, was recorded with and produced by multi-instrumentalist Jim Lea of Slade. Another single from the album, "War Boys", produced by John Robie, spent six weeks on the US Billboard Hot Dance/Disco, chart, peaking at No. 28. "Don't Dance With Strangers" and "Fever" were included on The Best of Bow Wow Wow, released by BMI on 29 October 1996.

She formed a new band, Naked Experience, and collaborated with seasoned musicians and songwriters such as Billy Steinberg and Ellen Shipley. In 1994, Sony Soho Square released two singles, "Car Sex" and "Do What You Do", billed as "Annabella Lwin". "Car Sex" made the Top 10 in the UK Dance Chart, while the remixed dance follow-up "Do What You Do" (1995), produced by Steve Lironi, spent one week at No. 61 in the UK Singles Chart. In 1999, Cleopatra Records released Virgin Voices: A Tribute To Madonna, Volume One. It contained a cover of "Like a Virgin" credited to "Annabella Lwin of Bow Wow Wow".

== Reformation ==
In 1997, Lwin and Gorman reformed Bow Wow Wow, adding guitarist Dave Calhoun and drummer Eshan Khadaroo. They embarked on the "Barking Mad" tour in 1997–1998, which produced a compilation CD, Wild in the U.S.A. (Cleopatra Records), that included live material and remixes of previous Bow Wow Wow tracks.

In 1998, they collaborated with DJ Swedish Egil on the track "Eastern Promise", released as part of Egil's Groove Radio Presents: Alternative Mix CD by Priority Records. They contributed the song "A Thousand Tears" to the 1999 film Desperate But Not Serious (retitled Reckless + Wild in the US), starring Christine Taylor and Claudia Schiffer, and appeared in the film.

Bow Wow Wow performed at the KROQ Inland Invasion festival in September 2003, with a lineup including Los Angeles guitarist Phil Gough (of Novacaine) and drummer Adrian Young (of No Doubt). In September 2005, Philadelphia native Devin Beaman was brought in as the new drummer.

Bow Wow Wow songs "Aphrodisiac", "I Want Candy" and "Fools Rush In" (the latter two remixed by Kevin Shields of My Bloody Valentine) were included on the soundtrack of the 2006 Sofia Coppola film Marie Antoinette. The band performed on 2 November 2006 at the Maritime Hotel's Hiro Lounge in New York City to promote the film.

In 2006, Bow Wow Wow recorded a cover of the Smiths' song "I Started Something I Couldn't Finish", which appeared on three 2007 releases: a new three-track I Want Candy EP (Cleopatra), compilation album Stop Me If You Think You've Heard This One Before: A Tribute to the Smiths (Cleopatra) and the soundtrack to the film Blood & Chocolate: Original Motion Picture Soundtrack (Lakeshore Records).

On the 15th anniversary of Ashman's death, the band, featuring original drummer Barbarossa and guitarist Will Crewdson, performed at a tribute concert for Ashman on 21 November 2010 at the Scala in London. Adam Ant headlined the show and also featured members of Ashman's other bands, Chiefs of Relief and Agent Provocateur. Crewdson would later again serve as a replacement for Ashman alongside Gorman and Barbarossa, backing Ant on the above-mentioned 2014 Dirk Wears White Sox concerts.

With a new guitarist (Jimmy Magoon) and drummer (Dylan Thomas), Bow Wow Wow played shows in California and toured the UK in 2011–2012.

In December 2012, Gorman began performing under the name "Bow Wow Wow" without original lead singer Lwin, and launched a new Bow Wow Wow Facebook page after Lwin suddenly left the band. This version of the band included new singer Chloe Demetria of the band Vigilant as well as guitarist Matthew Fuller and drummers Lyle Riddle and Sean Winchester. In 2014, actor/musician Zachary Throne (Sin City Sinners) took over on guitar, and Les Warner replaced Winchester. In a 2016 Washington Times interview, Gorman indicated that he was interested in creating new Bow Wow Wow music with this lineup.

Lwin has continued to perform billed as "Annabella Lwin of the original Bow Wow Wow". Her official website states, "Any shows advertised as Bow Wow Wow WITHOUT Annabella, featuring a hired singer from another band, are done without knowledge, permission or consent. Before you buy a ticket, make sure it is the ORIGINAL voice of Bow Wow Wow!"

Gorman assembled a new lineup for Bow Wow Wow as of January 2020, with "Dinzy" Kristen Dinsmore as lead vocalist for the Totally 80's U.S. winter tour with The Motels and When in Rome II.

As of October 2021, Madelyn Feller, professionally known as Dame Madelyn, began performing as the group's lead vocalist.

== Bow Wow Wow's sound ==
The group's sound was a mix of Lwin's "girlish squeal", chants, surf instrumentals, pop melodies, funk bass, and Barbarossa's Burundi ritual music-influenced tom-tom drum beats. They have since been described as new wave, pop and worldbeat.

The degree to which Bow Wow Wow was influenced by—rather than plagiarised—the music of native African nations and tribes such as the Royal Drummers of Burundi and the Zulus has been a matter of debate. It is thought that when McLaren started to advise Adam and the Ants on the direction they should take after Dirk Wears White Sox, he gave the band (the instrumentalists who would eventually become Bow Wow Wow) a variety of recordings of world music from which to draw inspiration. When the Ants dropped out to form Bow Wow Wow, Adam Ant took the recordings from the band's early work in this new direction to start his new incarnation of the Ants; thus, both bands made music influenced by the recordings offered by McLaren. Among the recordings was one titled "Burundi Black". The story of "Burundi Black" and the origin of the "Burundi Beat" and the associated controversy was detailed in an excerpt from a 1981 New York Times article by Robert Palmer:

The original source of this tribal rhythm is a recording of 25 drummers, made in a village in the east African nation of Burundi by a team of French anthropologists. The recording was included in an album, Musique du Burundi, issued by the French Ocora label in 1968. It is impressively kinetic, but the rhythm patterns are not as complex as most African drumming; they are a relatively easy mark for pop pirates in search of plunder. During the early 1970s, a British pop musician named Mike Steiphenson grafted an arrangement for guitars and keyboards onto the original recording from Burundi, and the result was Burundi Black, an album that sold more than 125,000 copies and made the British best-seller charts ... Adam and the Ants, Bow Wow Wow, and several other bands have notched up an impressive string of British hits using the Burundi beat as a rhythmic foundation. But the Burundian drummers who made the original recording are not sharing in the profits. Nobody told them to copyright their traditional music, and trying to obtain copyright for a rhythm would be a difficult proposition in any case.

It was also charged that Bow Wow Wow plagiarised melodies from Zulu jive songs and Zulu pop songs and turned the original Zulu lyrics into English mondegreens, as with the origin of the lines "See Jungle! See Jungle! Go Join Your Gang, Yeah! City All over Go Ape Crazy!", "Golly! Golly! Go Buddy!" and "Hey i-yai-yo". In answer to this issue, the 1981 Times article offered the following statement in Bow Wow Wow's defence:

It's [The 'Burundi Beat'] the driving force and most distinctive ingredient in much of Adam Ant's music and has been equally valuable to other British rockers. The fact that Adam and the Ants have used it to power fatuous celebrations of tribalism makes their borrowing even more distasteful. Pirates, indeed! Again, Bow Wow Wow is another matter. The Burundian recording still influences the group's rhythms, but they are varied and flexible rather than slavishly imitative. And the Bow Wows have absorbed other rhythmic usages, including West African high life, Brazilian pop, and conventional rock and roll. They seem to be able to synthesize their influences into appealing trash-pop as easily as they subvert Malcolm McLaren's image manipulation.

In an RCA radio promo vinyl recording, guitarist Ashman responded:

Well, they do a lot of that sort of chanting in Africa, but it's not a direct rip-off. It's just our interpretation of it, really. A lot of the ideas are ours, and they're brand-new, a lot of those chants. You know what I mean? They're not stolen from some poor tribe in Africa. It's just like the influence is there, and we'll use it. Yeah, it's just a good noise, isn't it? It's a good sound.

== Legacy ==
The Red Hot Chili Peppers name-checked the band on their 1992 single "Suck My Kiss", which included the lyric "Swimming in the sound of Bow Wow Wow", and Peppers guitarist John Frusciante has listed Ashman as an influence.

No Doubt's Adrian Young said of the opportunity to play drums for Bow Wow Wow from 2003 to 2005, "It is a dream come true to play with a band I grew up idolising. I feel like a kid back in the sand box".

Film director Sofia Coppola drew inspiration from Lwin when conceiving the style for her film, Marie Antoinette. Said Bow Wow Wow's tour manager in 2006, "They actually based Marie Antoinette, from a styling point of view, on Annabella Lwin. They drew parallels from the fact that they were both young girls who found fame and fortune at a ridiculously early age."

On 25 May 2018, Cherry Red Records released the three-disc set Your Box Set Pet (The Complete Recordings 1980–1984).

== Band members ==
Current

Bow Wow Wow Band

- Leigh Gorman – bass (1980–1983, 1997–1998, 2003–present)
- Dame Madelyn – vocals (2021–present)
- Zachary Throne – guitar (2014–present)
- Les Warner – drums (2014–present)

Annabella's Bow Wow Wow

- Annabella Lwin – vocals (1980–1983, 1997–1998, 2003–present)

Former

- Boy George – vocals (1980)
- Dave Barbarossa – drums (1980-1983, 2010)
- Matthew Ashman – guitar (1980–1983; died 1995)
- Dave Calhoun – guitar (1997–1998)
- Eshan Khadaroo – drums (1997–1998)
- Phil Gough – guitar (2003–2011)
- Adrian Young – drums (2003–2005)
- Devin Beaman – drums (2005–2011)
- Will Crewdson – guitar (2010)
- Jimmy Magoon – guitar (2011–2012)
- Dylan Thomas – drums (2011–2012)
- Chloe Demetria - vocals (2012–2019)
- Matthew Fuller – guitar (2012–2014)
- Lyle Riddle – drums (2012–2014)
- Sean Winchester – drums (2012–2014)
- "Dinzy" Kristen Dinsmore - vocals (2020–2021)

== Discography ==
- See Jungle! See Jungle! Go Join Your Gang Yeah, City All Over! Go Ape Crazy! (1981)
- When the Going Gets Tough, the Tough Get Going (1983)
