= The Last of the Mohicans (EP) =

EP by Bow Wow Wow
- Released: May 1982
- Recorded: 1981–1982
- Studio: Criteria (Miami)
- Genre: New wave; pop rock
- Length: 12:27
- Label: RCA
- Producer: Kenny Laguna

Bow Wow Wow chronology
See Jungle! See Jungle! Go Join Your Gang Yeah, City All Over! Go Ape Crazy! (1981)	The Last of the Mohicans (1982)	Teenage Queen (1982)

Singles from The Last of the Mohicans
- 1. "I Want Candy" Released: 28 May 1982

Professional ratings
Review scores
Source	Rating
AllMusic	2.5/5 stars
Christgau's Record Guide	B
The Rolling Stone Album Guide	2/5 stars

The Last of the Mohicans is an EP by the English new wave band Bow Wow Wow, released in May 1982 by RCA Records. It was produced by Kenny Laguna of Joan Jett & the Blackhearts fame.

The Last of the Mohicans peaked at number 67 on the Billboard 200, Bow Wow Wow's highest entry on the chart. The EP contains the band's biggest hit, a cover of the Strangeloves' "I Want Candy".

The cover photograph, taken by Andy Earl, depicts Bow Wow Wow recreating Le Déjeuner sur l'herbe by Édouard Manet, and caused outrage when it first appeared as the cover of the band's debut album See Jungle! See Jungle! Go Join Your Gang Yeah, City All Over! Go Ape Crazy!.

== Track listing ==
Side one
No.	Title	Writer(s)	Length
1.	"I Want Candy"	Bert Berns; Bob Feldman; Jerry Goldstein; Richard Gottehrer	2:43
2.	"Cowboy"	Matthew Ashman; David Barbarossa; Leigh Gorman; Pierre Grillet; Malcolm McLaren; Stephane Pietri	3:30

Side two
No.	Title	Writer(s)	Length
3.	"Louis Quatorze"	Ashman; Barbarossa; Gorman; McLaren	2:48
4.	"Mile High Club"	Ashman; Barbarossa; Gorman; McLaren	3:26
Total length:			12:27

Notes

- "Cowboy" is credited as being written by Ashman, Barbarossa, Gorman and McLaren on The Last of the Mohicans. Later releases, including the 1982 compilation album I Want Candy, have credited it as being written by Ashman, Barbarossa, Gorman, Grillet and Pietri. Sources such as the American Society of Composers, Authors and Publishers and the Australasian Performing Right Association continue to credit McLaren as a writer on the song.

== Charts ==
Chart (1982)	Peak position
US Billboard 200	67
