= I Want Candy =

1965 single by the Strangeloves

- Side-A label of the American vinyl single

Single by the Strangeloves

from the album I Want Candy
- B-side: "It's About My Baby"
- Released: May 19, 1965
- Genre: Rock and roll; garage rock; proto-punk; bubblegum
- Length: 2:58
- Label: Bang
- Songwriters: Bert Berns; Bob Feldman; Jerry Goldstein; Richard Gottehrer
- Producer: The Strangeloves

The Strangeloves singles chronology
"Love, Love" (1964)	"I Want Candy" (1965)	"Out in the Sun" (1965)

Audio
- "I Want Candy" on YouTube

"I Want Candy" is a song written and originally recorded by the Strangeloves in 1965 that reached No. 11 on the US Billboard Hot 100 chart. It is a famous example of a song that uses the Bo Diddley beat. It has gone on to spawn multiple successful cover versions, including by The Tremeloes, Bow Wow Wow, Aaron Carter, Melanie C, and others.

== Original version ==
"I Want Candy" was written by Bert Berns, Bob Feldman, Jerry Goldstein and Richard Gottehrer in 1965. Some reports suggest that the song was written after the producers saw dancer Candy Johnson performing at the 1964 World's Fair.

As writers/producers, Feldman, Goldstein and Gottehrer had already scored big hits for other artists, including "My Boyfriend's Back" by the Angels. For this song, the trio took on the moniker of the Strangeloves, and recorded the tune themselves, augmented by studio musicians (co-writer Berns was not involved in the studio recording). The female vocalist heard half-screaming, half-singing "Baby!" in the middle of the track was an unknown session singer.

Although Feldman, Goldstein and Gottehrer used their real names in the writing and production credits of this single, they claimed the Strangeloves were actually three Australian brothers (and ex-sheep farmers) named Giles, Miles and Niles Strange. Feldman, Goldstein and Gottehrer dressed up in shaggy wigs and exotic clothing for publicity photos as the Strangeloves.

"I Want Candy", the Strangeloves' second single, reached No. 7 in Canada and hit No. 11 in the US. The record failed to chart in the UK—or in the Strangeloves' ostensibly "native" country, Australia.

== The Tremeloes version ==
In the UK, the song first hit the UK Singles Chart in 1965, in a version by beat group Brian Poole and the Tremeloes, who released their version that July and took it to No. 25. This version also peaked at No. 81 in Australia.

== The Count Bishops version ==
The Count Bishops, a British proto punk and pub-rock band, released their version of "I Want Candy" on independent label Chiswick Records in June 1978, making an appearance on the British TV show Top of the Pops.

== Bow Wow Wow version ==
"I Want Candy"
- Standard UK and international vinyl picture sleeve

Single by Bow Wow Wow

from the EP The Last of the Mohicans
- B-side: "King Kong"
- Released: May 28, 1982
- Studio: Criteria (Miami)
- Genre: New wave; bubblegum
- Length: 2:46
- Label: RCA
- Songwriters: Bert Berns; Bob Feldman; Jerry Goldstein; Richard Gottehrer
- Producer: Kenny Laguna

Bow Wow Wow singles chronology
"Go Wild in the Country" (1982)	"I Want Candy" (1982)	"Fools Rush In" (1982)

Music video
- "I Want Candy" on YouTube

British new wave band Bow Wow Wow released their version in May 1982 as the lone single from their EP The Last of the Mohicans. It was a top 10 hit in their native United Kingdom. For many in America, "I Want Candy" was their first introduction to young lead singer Annabella Lwin and the band, who partnered with producer Kenny Laguna to record the song at Criteria Studios in Miami, Florida. The song barely scraped the top 60 there but became an enduring new wave classic.

The single was released in the UK as a one sided single, with "I Want Candy" on the A side, and the Bow Wow Wow logo etched onto the B side. To capitalize on the success of the "I Want Candy" music video, which was directed and produced by Steve Kahn, RCA compiled an album called I Want Candy for their newfound American audience. The album peaked at No. 123 on the Billboard 200.

EMI also used the name in the UK for a compilation of tracks (not including the actual song) the band had recorded for the label in 1980-1981. Elsewhere in the world, this album was titled Twelve Original Recordings. The UK release peaked at No. 26 in the UK Album Charts, matching the peak position of See Jungle! See Jungle! Go Join Your Gang Yeah, City All Over! Go Ape Crazy!, the band's official debut studio album on RCA.

The Bow Wow Wow recording appeared on two VH1 countdowns:

- No. 86 on VH1's "100 Greatest Songs of the '80s"
- No. 8 on VH1's "100 Greatest One Hit Wonders of the '80s"

=== Charts ===
Chart (1982)	Peak position
Australia (Kent Music Report)	39
Belgium (Ultratop 50 Flanders)	30
Ireland (IRMA)	7
Netherlands (Dutch Top 40)	26
Netherlands (Single Top 100)	23
New Zealand (Recorded Music NZ)	30
UK Singles (Official Charts)	9
US Billboard Hot 100	62
US Hot Dance Club Play (Billboard)	36
US Top Tracks (Billboard)	22
US Cash Box Top 100	61

== Candy Girls version ==
"I Want Candy"

Single by Candy Girls featuring Valerie Malcolm
- B-side: "Four other remixes"
- Released: November 13, 1996
- Studio: The Sleaze Pit Studios
- Genre: Dance
- Length: 3:30 (radio edit)
- Label: Feverpitch; EMI
- Songwriters: Bert Berns; Bob Feldman; Jerry Goldstein; Richard Gottehrer
- Producer: Candy Girls

Candy Girls singles chronology
"Wham Bam" (1995)	"I Want Candy" (1996)

Valerie Malcolm singles chronology
"I Want Candy" (1996)	"History '97" (1997)

Music video
- "I Want Candy" on YouTube

British duo Candy Girls, consisting of Rachel Auburn and Paul Masterson, released cover of "I Want Candy" featuring singer Valerie Malcolm. It became their third hit single in 1996, peaking at No. 30 on the UK Singles Chart and No. 12 on the UK Dance Singles Chart. On Music Week's UK on a Pop Tip Club Chart, the song hit number-one. The single was their last as the duo split after the release. Masterson went on to have hits as Amen! UK, Clergy, Yomanda, Dorothy and Hi-Gate. A music video was also produced to promote the single, featuring the duo performing by a swimming pool with a group of male swimmers.

=== Critical reception ===
A reviewer from Music Week rated Candy Girls' version of "I Want Candy" three out of five, describing it as "a pumped-up version of Bow Wow Wow's hit complete with piano breaks for that hands in the air bit. The girls' debut could catapult them chartwards." Daisy & Havoc from the magazine's RM Dance Update gave it a score of four out of five, writing, "The next booming Candy Girls outing is probably their best yet. It's really amusing, with the so-suitable 'I want candy' vocal and the all-round Nineties pop meets Fifties kitsch feel, and it's positively rabble-rousing in its enormous piano breaks."

=== Track listings ===
- Disc 1
1. "I Want Candy" (Radio Edit)
2. "I Want Candy" (12" Mix)
3. "I Want Candy" (Candy's Disco Dub)
4. "I Want Candy" (Jon the Dentist's Mix)
5. "I Want Candy" (Beat Barons Mix)
- Disc 2
1. "I Want Candy" (Radio Edit)
2. "Wham Bam"
3. "Fee Fi Fo Fum"

=== Charts ===
==== Weekly charts ====
Chart (1996–1997)	Peak position
Australia (ARIA)	57
Canada Dance/Urban (RPM)	6
Europe (Eurochart Hot 100)	63
Israel (Israeli Singles Chart)	17
Scottish Singles Sales (Official Charts)	31
UK Singles (Official Charts)	30
UK Dance (Official Charts)	12
UK Pop Tip Club Chart (Music Week)	1

==== Year-end charts ====
Chart (1996)	Position
UK Pop Tip Club Chart (Music Week)	8

== Aaron Carter version ==
"I Want Candy"

Single by Aaron Carter

from the album Aaron's Party (Come Get It)
- B-side: "Jump, Jump"
- Released: September 4, 2000
- Genre: Pop
- Length: 3:16
- Label: Jive; Zomba
- Songwriters: Bert Berns; Bob Feldman; Jerry Goldstein; Richard Gottehrer
- Producer: Steve Mac

Aaron Carter singles chronology
"Aaron's Party (Come Get It)" (2000)	"I Want Candy" (2000)	"That's How I Beat Shaq" (2001)

Music video
- "I Want Candy" on YouTube

Aaron Carter released a cover of "I Want Candy" as his seventh overall single, and the second single from his second album, Aaron's Party (Come Get It) (2000).

This version of "I Want Candy" begins with a phone conversation with a friend about a girl named Candy. Carter promoted it by performing it on the show Lizzie McGuire. A music video was produced to promote the single, directed by Andrew MacNaughtan. Carter released a remix of the song in 2018, self-produced on his LøVë album.

The music video for this version features Carter going on a date with Candy while three boys constantly harass him.

=== Track listings ===
Single

1. "I Want Candy" (album version) – 3:13
2. "I Want Candy" (instrumental) – 3:13

Maxi CD

1. "I Want Candy" (album version) – 3:13
2. "I Want Candy" (instrumental) – 3:13
3. "Jump Jump" – 2:39

=== Charts ===
==== Weekly charts ====
Chart (2000)	Peak position
Australia (ARIA)	27
Australian Dance (ARIA)	15
France (SNEP)	46
Germany (GfK)	68
Netherlands (Dutch Top 40)	27
Netherlands (Single Top 100)	21
Scottish Singles Sales (Official Charts)	35
Sweden (Sverigetopplistan)	10
UK Singles (Official Charts)	31
UK Indie (Official Charts)	9

==== Year-end charts ====
Chart (2000)	Position
Sweden (Hitlistan)	92

== Melanie C version ==
"I Want Candy"

Single by Melanie C

from the album This Time
- B-side: "Already Gone"
- Released: March 26, 2007
- Genre: Pop
- Length: 3:23
- Label: Red Girl
- Songwriters: Bert Berns; Bob Feldman; Jerry Goldstein; Richard Gottehrer
- Producer: Stephen Hague

Melanie C singles chronology
"The Moment You Believe" (2007)	"I Want Candy" (2007)	"Carolyna" (2007)

Music video
- "I Want Candy" on YouTube

"I Want Candy" was released as the second single from British singer Melanie C's fourth album This Time, and the first single in the UK, Denmark and Italy, released on March 26, 2007. The song was also the soundtrack to the film of the same name, and the video featured Melanie dancing for the first time since the Spice Girls. Melanie split her time between the UK and Europe, where she was promoting "The Moment You Believe", and as a result, the single was not heavily promoted and reached No. 24 – although on the physical chart, the single reached No. 7. "I Want Candy" went on to sell 12,510 copies in the UK, but had better success in Italy (No. 9) and Denmark (No. 12).

Melanie premiered her version of the song during Al Murray's Happy Hour on ITV1 on February 24, 2007. The video was premiered on March 2, 2007 in the UK. The song was released as Italy's and Denmark's first single from the new album, where it reached No. 9 in both countries, while in other European countries, the ballad "The Moment You Believe" was chosen.

=== Music video ===
A music video for "I Want Candy", directed by Tim Royes, depicts Melanie C in a skin-tight catsuit, featuring a sexually suggestive dance routine with half-naked bodybuilders in crowd-controller uniforms. The video instantly grabbed the number one spot on YouTube with 200,000 hits in its first day.

=== Track listings ===
UK CD single
No.	Title	Writer(s)	Producer(s)	Length
1.	"I Want Candy" (single version)	Berns; Feldman; Goldstein; Gottehrer	Hague	3:24
2.	"I Want Candy"	Melanie Chisholm; Dave Munday; Phil Thornalley	Hague	4:08

UK maxi CD single
No.	Title	Writer(s)	Producer(s)	Length
1.	"I Want Candy" (single version)	Bert Berns; Bob Feldman; Jerry Goldstein; Richard Gottehrer	Stephen Hague	3:23
2.	"I Want Candy" (Club Junkies mix)	Berns; Feldman; Goldstein; Gottehrer	Hague; Club Junkies^{[a]}	6:37
3.	"I Want Candy" (So-Lo's Electric vocal mix)	Berns; Feldman; Goldstein; Gottehrer	Hague; So-Lo^{[a]}	5:16
4.	"I Want Candy" (So-Lo's Filtered disco dub)	Berns; Feldman; Goldstein; Gottehrer	Hague; So-Lo^{[a]}	7:33
5.	"I Want Candy" (music video)			3:22

Notes

- ^{^[a]} signifies an additional producer

=== Credits and personnel ===
Credits adapted from the liner notes of This Time.

- Bert Berns – writer
- Bob Feldman – writer
- Jerry Goldstein – writer
- Richard Gottehrer – writer
- Paul Grady – engineer
- Stephen Hague – engineer, producer

=== Charts ===
Weekly chart performance for "I Want Candy"
Chart (2007)	Peak position
Denmark (Tracklisten)	9
Italy (FIMI)	9
Scottish Singles Sales (Official Charts)	9
UK Singles (Official Charts)	24
