= Tell Me When (The Applejacks song) =

1964 single by the Applejacks

Single by the Applejacks
- B-side: "Baby Jane"
- Released: 14 February 1964
- Recorded: 12 January 1964
- Studio: Decca Studios, London
- Genre: Beat
- Length: 2:17
- Label: Decca
- Songwriter(s): Les Reed; Geoff Stephens
- Producer(s): Mike Smith

The Applejacks singles chronology
"Tell Me When" (1964)	"Like Dreamers Do" (1964)

"Tell Me When" is a song by British group the Applejacks, released as their debut single in February 1964. It became their only top-ten hit, peaking at number seven on the Record Retailer chart.

== Background and release ==
"Tell Me When" was written by Les Reed and Geoff Stephens. On the suggestion of publisher and producer Frank Poser, Stephens teamed up with Les Reed, with neither having yet written a hit song. After being played part of a tune Reed had written, Stephens thought that the words 'tell me when' fitted exactly. The phrase, used when pouring a drink, was applied metaphorically in the song to refer to a relationship, i.e. per the lyrics 'tell me when you're ready to be mine'.

Recorded at Decca Studios in January 1964, it was released as a single a month later with the B-side "Baby Jane", written by Pete Dello and Ray Cane, who would go on to form Honeybus and have their own hit "I Can't Let Maggie Go".

== Personnel ==
- Al Jackson – lead vocals
- Martin Baggott – lead guitar
- Phil Cash – rhythm guitar
- Megan Davies – bass guitar
- Don Gould – organ
- Gerry Freeman – drums

== Charts ==
Chart (1964)	Peak position
Australia (Kent Music Report)	50
Canada (Vancouver CFUN)	15
New Zealand (Lever Hit Parade)	7
UK Disc Top 30	5
UK Melody Maker Top 50	5
UK New Musical Express Top 30	5
UK Record Retailer Top 50	7
US Bubbling Under the Hot 100 (Billboard)	135
