= The Best of Liverpool Express =

Greatest hits album by Liverpool Express
- Released: August 2002
- Recorded: 1975–1979, 1983, 2002; D.J.M Studios, London; Olympic Studios, London; Errigal Studios, California
- Genres: Rock, pop
- Labels: Every Man Records, Townsend
- Producers: Roger Scott Craig & Billy Kinsley

Liverpool Express chronology
L.E.X. (1979)	The Best of Liverpool Express (2002)	Once Upon a Time (2003)

Singles from The Best of Liverpool Express
- 1. "John George Ringo & Paul" Released: August 2002

The Best of Liverpool Express is a greatest hits compilation album by Liverpool Express, released in August 2002. It features all the band's hit recordings, and one new song, "John George Ringo & Paul" - a tribute to The Beatles.

== Track listing ==
1. "You Are My Love" (Roger Craig, Billy Kinsley)
2. "Dreamin" (Craig, Kinsley)
3. "Margie" (Kinsley)
4. "Take It Easy With My Heart" (Kinsley)
5. "Every Man Must Have a Dream" (Craig, Kinsley, Tony Coates)
6. "I Want Nobody But You" (Kinsley)
7. "It's a Beautiful Day" (Craig, Kinsley)
8. "Julian the Hooligan" (Craig, Kinsley, Coates)
9. "So Here I Go Again" (Kinsley)
10. "John George Ringo & Paul" (Craig)
11. "Smile" (Craig, Kinsley)
12. "So What" (Kinsley, Kenny Parry)
13. "Last Train Home" (Kinsley)
14. "Hold Tight" (Craig, Kinsley)
15. "Never Be the Same Boy" (Craig, Kinsley)
16. "Don't Stop the Music" (Kinsley)

== Personnel ==
Liverpool Express

- Billy Kinsley – lead, harmony and backing vocals, bass guitar, acoustic guitar
- Tony Coates – lead, harmony, and backing vocals, rhythm guitar, lead
- Kenny Parry – lead, harmony, and backing vocals, rhythm guitar, lead ("So What")
- Roger Scott Craig – harmony and backing vocals, piano
- Dave Goldberg – harmony and backing vocals, piano ("So What")
- Derek Cashin – harmony and backing vocals, drums
- Pete Kircher – harmony and backing vocals, drums ("Take It Easy With My Heart", "I Want Nobody But You")
- Brian Rawling – harmony and backing vocals, drums ("So What")
