= Liverpool Express discography =

- Studio albums: 4
- Extended plays: 2
- Soundtrack albums: 4
- Compilation albums: 2
- Tribute albums: 1
- Singles: 17
- Music videos: 1

The following is a discography of albums and singles released by the British pop rock band Liverpool Express (also known as L.E.X.).

== Albums ==
=== Studio albums ===
Year	Album details
1976	Tracks: Release Date: June 1976; Label: Warner Bros Records; Format: 12-inch
1978	Dreamin': Release Date: July 1978; Label: Warner Bros Records; Format: 12-inch
1979	L.E.X.: Release Date: March 1979; Label: Warner Bros Records; Format: 12-inch
2003	Once Upon a Time: Release Date: 22 August 2003; Label: Every Man Records; Format: CD, Digital Download

=== Compilation albums ===
Year	Album details
2002	The Best of Liverpool Express: Release Date: August 2002; Label: Every Man Records; Format: CD, Digital Download
2019	You Are My Love: The Best of Liverpool Express: Release Date: February 2019; Label: Warner Music; Format: Digital Download

=== Other compilation albums ===
Year	Album details	Song(s) featured
1976	Hit Power: Release Date: 1976; Country: Germany; Label: Arcade; Format: 12-inch	"You Are My Love"
1976	Larger Than Life: Release Date: 1976; Country: UK; Label: WEA; Format: 12-inch	"You Are My Love"
1976	Pop-Parade: Release Date: 1976; Country: Netherlands; Label: K-Tel International; Format: 12-inch	"You Are My Love"
1977	Music Master: Release Date: December 1977; Country: Brazil; Label: K-Tel International; Format: 12-inch	"You Are My Love"
1978	En Tu Piel Los mh Positivos Vol. 12: Release Date: 1978; Country: Argentina; Label: Musichall; Format: 12-inch	"Don't Stop the Music"
1978	Special Disc Jockey Vol. 3: Release Date: 1978; Country: Brazil; Label: WEA International; Format: 12-inch	"Every Man Must Have a Dream"
1978	Lancelot Discotheque: Release Date: 1978; Country: Uruguay; Label: WEA; Format: 12-inch	"You Are My Love"
1979	Acontece: Release Date: 1979; Country: Brazil; Label: K-Tel International; Format: 12-inch	"Dreamin'"
1988	40 Eternal Originals From The Seventies: Release Date: 1988; Country: Israel; Label: Arton; Format: 12-inch	"You Are My Love"
1989	Love On The Dance Floor: Release Date: 1989; Country: UK; Label: Connoisseur Collection; Format: CD	"You Are My Love"
1992	25 Years of Rock 'n' Roll: 1976 Vol. 2: Release Date: 1992; Country: UK; Label: Connoisseur Collection; Format: CD	"You Are My Love"
1994	The 70s - 1976: Release Date: 1994; Country: UK; Label: Time Life; Format: CD	"You Are My Love"
1999	The Greatest Pop Ballads: Release Date: 1999; Country: UK; Label: Repertoire; Format: CD	"You Are My Love"
2003	We Want The Beatles Vol. 6: Release Date: 2003; Country: UK; Label: Yellow Fish; Format: CD	"John George Ringo & Paul"
2005	Big Hour Antena 1: Release Date: 2005; Country: Brazil; Label: Big Hour; Format: CD	"You Are My Love"
2008	70's Dinner Party: Release Date: 2008; Country: UK; Label: Sony Music; Format: CD	"Every Man Must Have a Dream"
2009	100 Essential Tracks - 70s: Release Date: 2009; Country: UK; Label: Sony; Format: CD	"You Are My Love"
2009	Pop Cycles Vol. 10: Release Date: 2009; Label: PopCycles; Format: Digital Download	"Margie"
2009	Gold Songs: Release Date: 2009; Label: Compact Disc Club; Format: CD	"You Are My Love"

== Extended plays ==
Year	EP details	Track listing
1977	Tracks (E.P.): Country: South America; Label: Warner Bros Records; Producer: Hal Carter & Peter Swettenham; Format: 7-inch	Side One: "You Are My Love" "Hold Tight" Side Two: "Every Man Must Have a Dream" "Rosemary"
1978	Dreamin' (E.P.): Country: South America; Label: Warner Bros Records; Producer: Hal Carter; Format: 7-inch	Side One: "Dreamin'" "Little Plum's Last Stand" Side Two: "Low Profile" "So Here I Go Again"

== Demos ==
Year	Demo details	Track listing
2003	Once Upon a Time: Country: UK; Label: Every Man Records; Producer: Roger Scott Craig & Billy Kinsley; Format: CD	"John George Ringo & Paul"; "Sailin' Down to Rio"; "Once Upon a Time"; "Out of the Blue"; "This Door Is Always Open"; "Chinatown"; "Best Years of My Life"; "The End of the Game"

== Singles ==
Year	Title	Writer	Album	Peak chart positions		
Year	Title	Writer	Album	UK	GER	NLD
1975	"Smile"	Craig/Kinsley	Tracks	—	—	—
1976	"You Are My Love"	Craig/Kinsley	Tracks	11	39	16
1976	"Hold Tight"	Craig/Kinsley	Tracks	46	—	—
1976	"Every Man Must Have a Dream"	Craig/Kinsley	Tracks	17	—	—
1977	"Dreamin'"	Craig/Kinsley	Dreamin'	40	—	—
1977	"Doing It All Again"	Craig/Kinsley	Tracks	—	—	—
1977	"So Here I Go Again"	Kinsley	Dreamin'	—	—	—
1977	"Das Kann Nur Mir Passiern"; Released by 'Stefan Hallberg & Liverpool Express'	Kinsley	Non-LP	—	—	—
1978	"Don't Stop the Music"	Kinsley	Non-LP	—	—	—
1979	"I Want Nobody But You"	Kinsley	L.E.X.	—	—	—
1979	"Games People Play"	South	L.E.X.	—	—	—
1983	"So What"	Kinsley/Parry	Non-LP	—	—	—
1985	"If You're Out There"	Kinsley/Parry	Non-LP	—	—	—
1991	"You Are My Love"	Craig/Kinsley	Non-LP	—	—	—
2002	"John George Ringo & Paul"	Craig	The Best of	—	—	—
2006	"It's a Beautiful Day"	Craig/Kinsley	The Best of	—	—	—
2011	"You Are My Love"	Craig/Kinsley	The Best of	—	—	—
"—" denotes releases that did not chart or were not released in that territory.

== Soundtrack appearances ==
Year	Soundtrack details	Song(s) featured
1977	The Squeeze: Label: Warner Bros Records; Format: 12-inch	"Oh No"
1977	Um Sol Maior - Internacional: Release Date: July 1977 (Brazil); Label: GTA; Format: 12-inch	"You Are My Love"
1978	O Astro: Release Date: March 1978 (Brazil); Label: Som Livre; Format: 12-inch	"Dreamin'"
1978	It Lives Again: Label: Warner Bros Records; Format: 12-inch	"Dreamin'" "All Time Loser"
