= Pete Kircher =

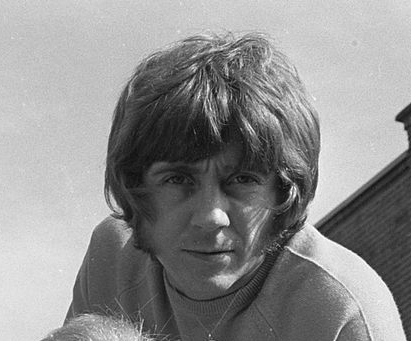
- Kircher in 1968

Background information
- Born: Peter Derek Kircher; 21 January 1945 (age 81); Folkestone, Kent, England
- Origin: London, England
- Genres: Hard rock; rock and roll; pop; soft rock
- Occupation: Musician
- Instrument: Drums
- Years active: 1960s–1985, 2003
- Formerly of: Honeybus; Shanghai; Liverpool Express; Original Mirrors; Status Quo

Peter Derek Kircher (born 21 January 1945, Folkestone, Kent) is a retired English rock/pop drummer. He was the drummer for Honeybus (1967–1970), Liverpool Express (1978–1979) and Original Mirrors (1979–1981). Between 1981 and 1985 he was a member of Status Quo, performing with the band at Live Aid and on the albums Back to Back and Live at the N.E.C..

After Kircher left Status Quo in 1985, he retired from the music business and, with the exception of a 2003 Honeybus reunion, has completely stepped from the spotlight. He was last known to have been working as a sign writer.

== Career ==
In the early 1960s, Kircher toured Germany doing club gigs as the drummer for The Burnettes, a band featuring Neil Landon as singer and Noel Redding playing guitar. His earliest documented recordings are with Redding, who later played bass with Jimi Hendrix.

=== Honeybus ===
More session work followed, before Kircher was recruited in April 1967 to join Honeybus, who although often written off as a one-hit wonder with their track “I Can’t Let Maggie Go” in 1968, produced a sizeable body of baroque pop music which culminated in a critically acclaimed 1970 album, Story, which was released after the eventual dissolution of the band.

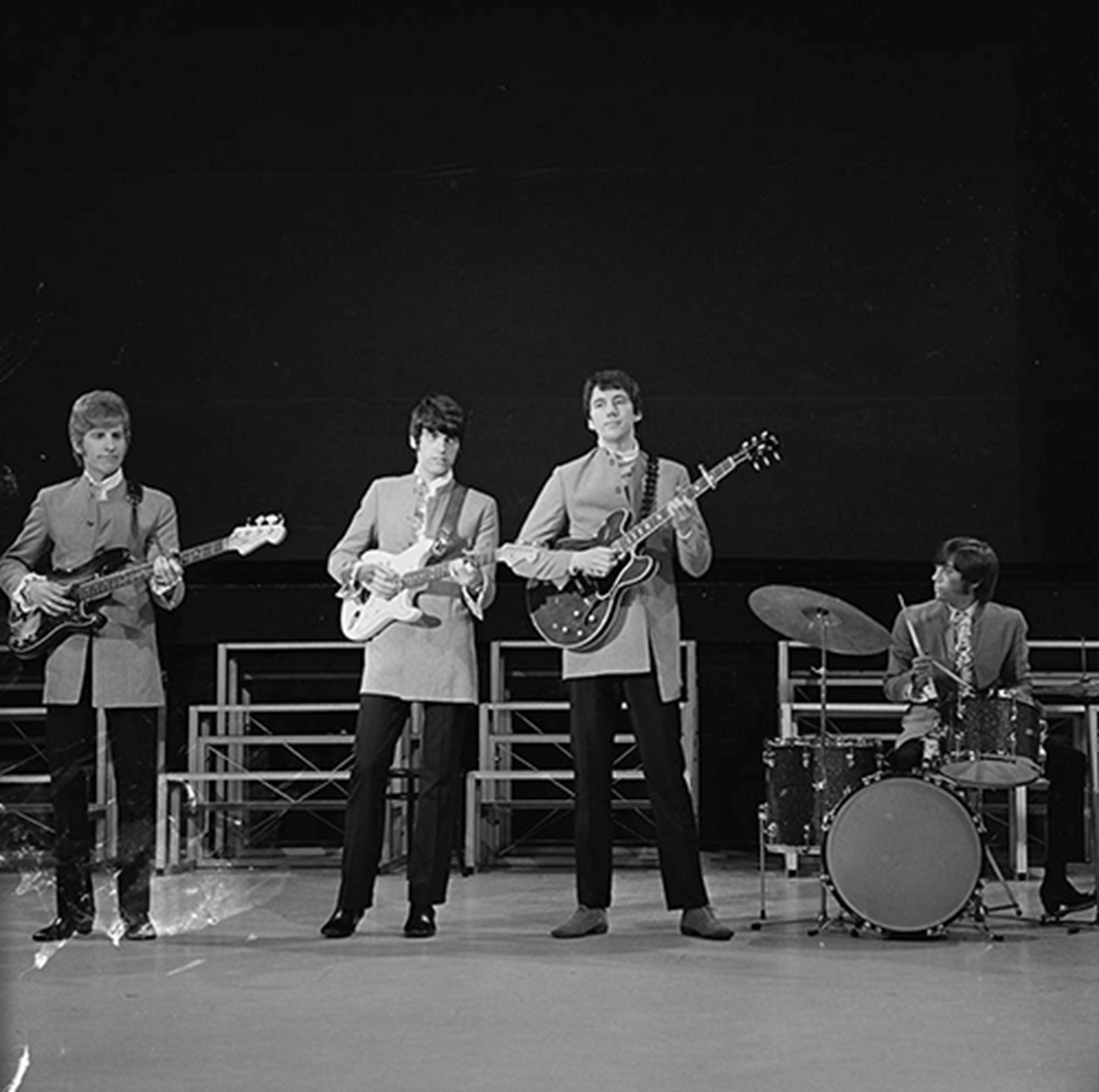
Kircher on drums with Honeybus in 1968

Less commercially successful work with Honeybus survives in the form of two albums, March Hare (credited to Colin Hare, the rhythm guitarist with Honeybus) and Into Your Ears, a solo album by Pete Dello, which were both released in 1971. Comparisons with Honeybus were inevitably drawn; the sessions bled into each other causing a reunion in all but name, and record company executives were impressed by this new work that they commissioned an album, Recital, to be released under the Honeybus name. Only test pressings of the original album exist, as a change in management at the label aborted the planned release; it was eventually released in 2018 on limited vinyl (mastered from Dello's own copy) by Mapache Records.

=== Liverpool Express and Status Quo ===
In 1978, Peter joined Liverpool Express as their drummer and contributing to their third album L.E.X., Kircher was invited in 1979 to join Original Mirrors, a new wave band featuring Ian Broudie (later of the bands Care and Lightning Seeds) on guitar. His time in this band took him up to 1981, taking in a session playing drums on the Nolan Sisters single "Who's Gonna Rock You", before being invited to join Status Quo following the resignation of John Coghlan. Kircher's membership was announced in a press conference in January 1982. Kircher played drums for Status Quo at their performance at Live Aid in 1985.

Not long after Status Quo's performance at Live Aid, Kircher left the group and retired from the music industry.

=== Other works ===
After Honeybus ended in 1973, Kircher was then a member of the band Shanghai, where he joined Mick Green from Johnny Kidd and the Pirates. The band produced two albums, released in 1974 and 1976, when the band supported Status Quo on the Blue for You tour. This, in turn, directly led to Kircher's induction into a group of session musicians for John Du Cann's The World's Not Big Enough album in 1977, which was produced by Quo's guitarist Francis Rossi. Kircher played drums on tracks 1-15 and 26.

Kircher often worked as a session drummer, most notably playing drums on "Right Back Where We Started From" by Maxine Nightingale. Kircher's style is rhythmic, and much of his work uses a low-tuned snare drum sound. As well as drums, Kircher contributed backing vocals to the bands he played with, and test pressings of a 1973 solo single – "Rockin' Lady" – are known to exist.

One of Kircher's last works as a professional musicians before retiring was recording some tracks with Rossi and Bernard Frost for their unreleased solo album Flying Debris in 1985

== Personal life ==
Little has been heard from Kircher since, although Honeybus were briefly reunited for a Dutch TV show in 2003. Kircher stated during an interview in this programme that he is now working as a signwriter, a profession he first started as a school leaver.

== Discography ==
Honeybus

- Story (1970)

Liverpool Express

- L.E.X. (1979)

Status Quo

- 1+9+8+2 (1982)
- Back to Back (1983)
- Live at the N.E.C (1984)

== See also ==
- Liverpool Express discography
