= It's a Beautiful Day (disambiguation) =

It's a Beautiful Day is an American musical group formed in San Francisco in 1967.

It's a Beautiful Day may also refer to:

- It's a Beautiful Day (album), above group's debut album, released in 1969
- "It's a Beautiful Day" (The Beach Boys song), 1979
- "It's a Beautiful Day" (Michael Bublé song), 2013
- "It's a Beautiful Day" (Sarah Brightman song), 2003
- "It's a Beautiful Day" (Wynn Stewart song), 1970
- "It's A Beautiful Day", 1976 song by Liverpool Express, from the Tracks album
- "It's a Beautiful Day" (Queen song), 1995
- "Beautiful Day", 2000 song by U2, from the All That You Can't Leave Behind album
- "It's A Beautiful Day Today", 1969 song by Moby Grape, from the Moby Grape '69 album
- It's a Beautiful Day (film), a 2013 Japanese-American horror film

== It's Such a Beautiful Day ==
- "It's Such a Beautiful Day" (short story), a short story by Isaac Asimov
- It's Such a Beautiful Day (film), a film by Don Hertzfeldt

== See also ==
- Beautiful Day (disambiguation)
