= Hang On Sloopy (album) =

Studio album by the McCoys
- Released: November 1965
- Genre: Rock
- Length: 26:26
- Label: Bang
- Producer: Bob Feldman, Jerry Goldstein, Richard Gottehrer

The McCoys chronology
Hang On Sloopy (1965)	You Make Me Feel So Good (1966)

Singles from Hang On Sloopy
- 1. "Hang On Sloopy"/"I Can't Explain It" Released: 1965; 2. "Fever"/"Sorrow" Released: 1965

Professional ratings
Review scores
Source	Rating
AllMusic	3/5 stars

Hang On Sloopy is the debut album by the McCoys, released in 1965. It reached number 44 on the Billboard Top LPs chart.

The album featured two singles: "Hang On Sloopy", which reached number 1 on the Billboard Hot 100, and "Fever", which reached number 7.

== Track listing ==
All songs written and composed by Bob Feldman, Jerry Goldstein and Richard Gottehrer except where noted.

1. "Meet the McCoys" – 2:00
2. "Hang On Sloopy" (Wes Farrell, Bert Russell) – 2:57
3. "Fever" (Eddie Cooley, John Davenport) – 2:47
4. "Sorrow" – 2:02
5. "If You Tell a Lie" – 1:58
6. "I Don't Mind" (James Brown) – 2:37
7. "Stubborn Kind of Fellow" (Marvin Gaye, William "Mickey" Stevenson, George Gordy) – 2:50
8. "I Can't Help Fallin' In Love" (Hugo Peretti, Luigi Creatore, George David Weiss) – 2:05
9. "All I Really Want to Do" (Bob Dylan) – 2:05
10. "Papa's Got a Brand New Bag" (James Brown) – 1:58
11. "I Can't Explain It" – 2:35
12. "High Heel Sneakers" (Robert Higginbotham) – 3:00
13. "Stormy Monday Blues" (Aaron Walker) – 4:00

== Personnel ==
- Produced by: Bob Feldman, Jerry Goldstein, Richard Gottehrer
- Arranged and Conducted by: Bassett Hand
- Engineered by: Eddie Smith, Gordy Clark, Stanley Weiss

== Charts ==
Chart (1965)	Peak position
Billboard	44

Singles

Year	Single	Chart	Position
1965	"Hang On Sloopy"	Billboard Hot 100	1
1965	"Hang On Sloopy"	Cashbox	1
1965	"Hang On Sloopy"	UK Singles Chart	5
1965	"Fever"	Billboard Hot 100	7
1965	"Fever"	Cashbox	9
1965	"Fever"	UK Singles Chart	44
