= Dreamin' (album) =

Studio album by Liverpool Express
- Released: 1978
- Recorded: Early–mid 1977; D.J.M. Studios, London
- Genre: Rock, pop
- Label: Warner Bros. Records
- Producer: Hal Carter

Liverpool Express chronology
Tracks (1976)	Dreamin' (1978)	L.E.X. (1979)

Singles from Dreamin'
- 1. "Dreamin'/The Beauty of the Bitch" Released: May 1977; 2. "So Here I Go Again/Oh No" Released: August 1977

Dreamin' is the second studio album by Liverpool Express, released in March 1978, in South America only. The album features the band's hit single, "Dreamin'. Other popular song's from this album are: "So Here I Go Again"; "Margie"; "Last Train Home"; and "Songbird, Sing Your Song".

The album was released on CD for the first time in 2017 along with "Tracks" and "L.E.X.". Each CD was presented in a boxset with a booklet detailing the band's history.

== Track listing ==
Side one

1. "Low Profile" (Roger Scott Craig, Billy Kinsley, Tony Coates, Derek Cashin)
2. "So Here I Go Again" (Billy Kinsley)
3. "Last Train Home" (Billy Kinsley)
4. "Margie" (Billy Kinsley)
5. "Songbird, Sing Your Song" (Roger Scott Craig)

Side two

1. "Little Plum's Last Stand" (Roger Scott Craig, Billy Kinsley, Tony Coates, Derek Cashin)
2. "Mary & Ann" (Roger Scott Craig)
3. "Dreamin'" (Roger Scott Craig, Billy Kinsley)
4. "All Time Loser" (Roger Scott Craig, Billy Kinsley, Tony Coates, Derek Cashin)
5. "Don't Give Up Your Day Job" (Billy Kinsley)

== Personnel ==
=== Liverpool Express ===
- Billy Kinsley – lead, harmony and backing vocals, bass and acoustic guitar
- Tony Coates – backing vocals and harmonies, rhythm, lead and acoustic guitars
- Roger Scott Craig – acoustic and electric piano, lead, harmony and backing vocals
- Derek Cashin – lead, harmony and backing vocals, drums

=== Additional personnel ===
- Judd Lander – Harmonica on "Last Train Home".
- Kathy McCabe – backing vocals on "Last Train Home".
