= Tony Crane (musician) =

English musician (born 1945)

Tony Crane MBE
- Born: Anthony Crane; 17 April 1945 (age 80); Liverpool, England
- Occupation: Musician
- Years active: 1961–present
- Label: Fontana
- Member of: The Merseybeats

Anthony Crane MBE (born 17 April 1945) is an English musician, who is best known as the co-founder of the Merseybeats. Tony has toured with the Merseybeats since its inception in 1961.

== Career ==
=== The Merseybeats ===
Crane was born in Anfield, Liverpool and originally wanted to be an architect as a child. Tony left school at 15 with no qualifications to work in the Royal Liver Building as an insurance clerk. He then started The Merseybeats, which was first called The Mavericks, with Billy Kinsley in 1960. On his lunch breaks, he played in the band at the Cavern Club.

Eventually, Disc Jockey Bob Wooler saw The Mavericks perform at The Cavern Club and approached Tony asking if they would like a residency at the Cavern. Bob Wooler thought their name sounded too country and western, and suggested a name change. The group changed their name to The Merseybeats.

They signed with Fontana Records and had their first hit single in 1963 with "It's Love That Really Counts", followed in 1964 by their million-selling record "I Think of You", which gained them their first gold disc.

=== The Merseys ===
After their initial success had waned, the band folded and in 1966 Crane and Kinsley formed a vocal duo called the Merseys. They had a major hit with their first single, a cover of the McCoys' "Sorrow", which reached Number 4 in the UK Singles Chart. The introduction on the record featured a bowed bass played by Jack Bruce. A line from this song, "with your long blonde hair and eyes of blue", is included in the Beatles' "It's All Too Much", released in 1969 as part of the Yellow Submarine soundtrack album. The duo split in 1968, with Crane and Kinsley both going on to front a number of other bands.

=== The Corporation ===
In 1988, Crane co-formed The Corporation, a group composed of members from popular 60s British groups. They released a single in 1988, a cover of The Showstoppers' song "Ain't Nothing But a House Party". They briefly named themselves The Travelling Wrinklies, which was a dig at the Anglo-American all-star group The Traveling Wilburys.

The group consisted of Clem Curtis (The Foundations), Mike Pender (The Searchers), Brian Poole (The Tremeloes) and Reg Presley (The Troggs).

== Personal life ==
He was awarded an MBE in 2017 for his services to Music, charity and the community in Merseyside. As of 2022, he lives in Hoylake and has property in Bermuda. Tony's son Adrian was a member of The Merseybeats from 2000 to 2009, as the Keyboardist. Crane still tours with The Merseybeats along with original member Billy Kinsley. They continue to tour and perform on the "sixties circuit", and at venues in the UK, and across Europe.

== The Merseybeats discography ==
=== Albums ===
- This Is Merseybeat Volume One (1963)
- The Merseybeats (1964)
- The Merseybeats Greatest Hits (1977)
- Crane Productions – Tony Crane Sings Elvis Presley (1978)
- The Merseybeats Beats & Ballads (1982)

=== EPs ===
- I Think of You (1963)
- The Merseybeats on Stage (1964)
- Wishin' and Hopin' (1964)

=== Singles ===
- "It's Love That Really Counts" / "The Fortune Teller" (1963)
- "I Think of You" / "Mr. Moonlight" (1963)
- "Don't Turn Around" / "Really Mystified" (1964)
- "Wishin' and Hopin'" / "Milkman" (1964)
- "Last Night" / "See Me Back" (1964)
- "Don't Let it Happen to Us" / "It Would Take a Long Long Time" (1965)
- "I Love You, Yes I Do" / "Good Good Lovin'" (1965)
- "I Stand Accused" / "All My Life" (1965)

=== CDs ===
- The Merseybeats (1990)
- The Merseybeats (1992)
- I'll Get You (1993)
- I'll Get You (Extended) (1993)
- The Merseybeats (1996)
- The Very Best of the Merseybeats (1997)
- The Merseybeats Greatest Hits (1999)
- I Think of You – The Complete Recordings (2002)
- The Merseybeats Greatest Hits (2003)
- Merseybeat – Anniversary Tour 2003 (2003)
- This Time (2003)
- The Merseybeats/The Merseys - I Stand Accused - The Complete Sixties Recordings (2021)

=== Cassettes ===
- The Merseybeats Greatest Hits (1977)

=== Videos ===
- The Merseybeats in Concert (1999)
- Tony Crane Sings Elvis Presley (1999)

== The Merseys Discography ==
=== Singles ===
- "Sorrow" / "Some Other Day" (1966)
- "So Sad About Us" / "Love Will Continue" (1966)
- "Rhythm of Love" / "Is It Love" (1966)
- "The Cat" / "Change of Heart" (1967)
- "Penny in My Pocket" / "I Hope You're Happy" (1967)
- "Lovely Loretta" / "Dreaming" (1968)
- "Honey Do" / "It Happens All the Time" (1968)
- "Sorrow" / "I Think of You" (1973)

=== EP's ===
- Rhythm of Love (1966)

== The Corporation Singles ==
- "Ain't Nothing But a House Party" / "Ain't Nothing But a House Party" (Instrumental) (1988)
- "Ain't Nothing But a House Party" (Extended Mix) / "Ain't Nothing But a House Party", "Ain't Nothing But a House Party" (Instrumental) (1988)
