= Bob Feldman =

American songwriter (1940–2023)

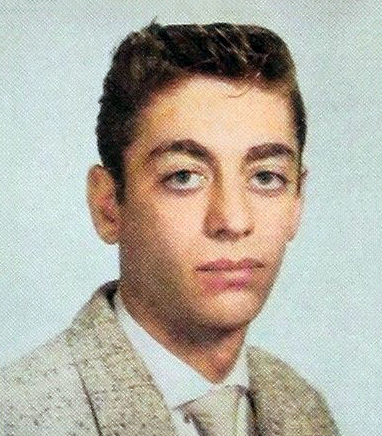
- Feldman on his 1958 high school yearbook

Background information
- Born: Robert C. Feldman; June 14, 1940; New York City, U.S.
- Died: August 23, 2023 (aged 83) Florida, U.S.
- Genre: Rock
- Occupations: Musician; songwriter; producer
- Years active: 1950–2023
- Labels: Motown; Swan; Atlantic; Bang; RCA
- Formerly of: The Strangeloves

Robert C. Feldman (June 14, 1940 – August 23, 2023) was an American songwriter and record producer, best known for his work in the 1960s with fellow writers Jerry Goldstein and Richard Gottehrer, including "My Boyfriend's Back", "I Want Candy", and "Sorrow". Feldman, Goldstein and Gottehrer were also the musicians behind the pop group The Strangeloves, who originally recorded their composition "I Want Candy".

== Early life ==
Robert C. Feldman was born in Brooklyn, New York, on June 14, 1940. He was raised in an Orthodox Jewish home and briefly studied to become a cantor. He graduated from Abraham Lincoln High School alongside Neil Sedaka, and was a member of the All-City Choir alongside Neil Diamond and Barbra Streisand.

He had a speech impediment, which he compensated for by writing poetry. At the age of eleven, he won a talent show sponsored by the New York Daily Mirror, resulting in some of his poems being published in their editions.

== Career ==
As doo-wop grew in popularity in the mid 1950s, Feldman sung on the streets of Brooklyn in several different vocal groups.

Together with his friend and neighbor Jerry Goldstein, he was a dancer on Alan Freed's WNEW-TV show The Big Beat, and in 1959 the pair co-wrote a theme song for the show. Feldman and Goldstein started writing regularly together, and, as Bob and Jerry, wrote and recorded "We Put the Bomp", an answer record to Barry Mann's "Who Put the Bomp". They recorded a few singles between 1961 and 1962 as Bob and Jerry, and were also members of various studio bands including Bobbi and the Beaus, Ezra and the Iveys, and the Kittens.

In 1962, they met fellow songwriter Richard Gottehrer, and formed FGG Productions. Feldman said: "I was the dreamer, Jerry was the schemer and Richie was the voice of reason". The trio wrote several hit singles together, including "My Boyfriend's Back" by The Angels.

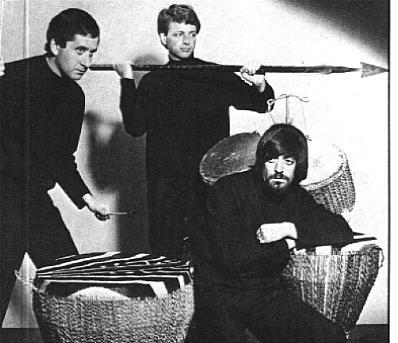
The Strangeloves, Gottehrer on the left, Goldstein in the centre, and Feldman on the right

In 1964, in response to the "British Invasion", they formed their own group, The Strangeloves. In 1965, the band had a hit with "I Want Candy", written by the trio, which went peaked at number eleven in America and number seven in Canada. The song has since been covered by Brian Poole And The Tremeloes and Bow Wow Wow. For the first few years of the Strangeloves' success, the trio pretended they were from Australia and were called Giles, Miles and Niles Strange, and even hired a group of young musicians to tour as the band, although the Feldman, Goldstein and Gottehrer continued to perform on the records.

With Goldstein and Gottehrer, Feldman also co-wrote "Sorrow" – first recorded by The McCoys and later a hit for both The Merseys and David Bowie – and "Gonna Make It Alone", recorded by Dion and by Ronnie Dio and the Prophets. The three also produced the McCoys' hit "Hang On Sloopy". Additional artists they wrote for included The Beach Nuts and The Sorrows.

In 1966, Feldman and Goldstein moved to California to set up their own office, and also recorded together as the duo Rome & Paris. Feldman later worked as a record producer with Link Wray, The Belmonts, and others. By the 1970s, Feldman, Goldstein and Gottehrer all parted ways musically, but remained good friends.

In the 1990s, he moved to Nashville, and in 2002 co-wrote Dusty Drake's debut country hit, "And Then".

In December 2018, nearly fifty years after they disbanded the Strangeloves, Feldman, Goldstein and Gottehrer performed a one-off reunion concert as The Strangeloves at Bowery Ballroom in Manhattan.

In 2019, he published a book of verse, lyrics and memoirs, Simply Put!: Thoughts and Feelings from the Heart. The blurb for the book was written by singer and friend of Feldman, Tony Orlando.

== Death ==
Feldman died on August 23, 2023, at age 83. He was survived by two daughters Kyle and Mahri.
