= L.E.X. =

Studio album by Liverpool Express
- Released: March 1979
- Recorded: 1978; Olympic Studios, London
- Genre: Rock, pop
- Label: Warner Bros. Records
- Producer: Tommy Boyce, Richard Hartley

Liverpool Express chronology
Dreamin' (1978)	L.E.X. (1979)	The Best of Liverpool Express (2002)

Singles from L.E.X.
- 1. "I Want Nobody But You/You Lied, I Cried" Released: February 1979; 2. "Games People Play/Don't You Knock Upon My Door" Released: March 1979

L.E.X. is the third studio album by Liverpool Express, released in March 1979, in Europe only. Popular song's from this album are: "I Want Nobody But You"; "Games People Play"; and "Take It Easy With My Heart".

The album was released on CD for the first time in 2017 along with "Tracks (Liverpool Express album)" and "Dreamin' (album)". Each CD was presented in a boxset with a booklet detailing the band's history.

== Track listing ==
Side one

1. "I Want Nobody But You" (Billy Kinsley)
2. "Take It Easy With My Heart" (Billy Kinsley)
3. "When My Boat Comes In" (Billy Kinsley)
4. "Last Train Home" (Billy Kinsley)
5. "Is Your Love In Vain" (Bob Dylan)

Side two

1. "Sharing You" (Gerry Goffin, Carole King)
2. "Games People Play" (Joe South)
3. "Motel Maria" (Tommy Boyce, Richard Hartley)
4. "What A Fool I've Been" (Billy Kinsley)

== Personnel ==
Liverpool Express

- Billy Kinsley – lead, harmony and backing vocals, bass guitar, acoustic guitar
- Tony Coates – harmony, and backing vocals, rhythm guitar, lead, acoustic guitar
- Roger Scott Craig – harmony and backing vocals, piano
- Pete Kircher – harmony and backing vocals, drums
