= The Corporation (English band) =

English pop group (1988)

- Origin: London, England
- Genres: Pop
- Years active: 1988
- Label: Corporation
- Past members: Tony Crane; Clem Curtis; Mike Pender; Brian Poole; Reg Presley

The Corporation was an English pop supergroup that was active in the 1980s and formed by musicians previously in popular, hit making, English bands of the 1960s.

== Career ==
The group consisted of Tony Crane (of The Merseybeats), Clem Curtis (of The Foundations), Mike Pender (of The Searchers), Brian Poole (of The Tremeloes) and Reg Presley (of The Troggs).

They released a single in 1988, a remake of The Showstoppers' old hit "Ain't Nothing But a House Party" on the Corporation Records label. They briefly named themselves The Travelling Wrinklies, which was a dig at the Anglo-American all-star group The Traveling Wilburys.

== Band members ==
=== Former members ===
- Tony Crane (The Merseybeats) – lead guitar (1988)
- Clem Curtis (The Foundations) – drums (1988; died 2017)
- Mike Pender (The Searchers) – rhythm guitar (1988)
- Brian Poole (The Tremeloes) – bass (1988)
- Reg Presley (The Troggs) – lead vocals (1988; died 2013
- Lucas Vigilante - keyboards (1988)

== Discography ==
7" single

- "Ain't Nothing But a House Party" / "Ain't Nothing But a House Party" (Instrumental) – Corporation Records – KORP 1 – 1988

12" single

- "Ain't Nothing But a House Party" (Extended Mix) / "Ain't Nothing But a House Party", "Ain't Nothing But a House Party" (Instrumental) – Corporation Records – 12 KORP 1 – 1988
