= Fortune (band) =

American musical group

- Also known as: The Fortune Band
- Origin: Los Angeles
- Genres: Rock, progressive rock, hard rock, new wave, AOR
- Years active: 1978–1986; 2006–present
- Members: Richard Fortune; Mick Fortune; Ricky Rat; Bob Emmett; Rick Livingstone
- Past members: Larry Greene; Roger Scott Craig; Bob Birch; Colleen Fortune; Ray Barrett; Mark Nilan; David De León

Fortune is a rock band that had a number of minor hits in the early 1980s including "Airwaves" from The Last American Virgin and, from their second 1985 album, "Stacy," "Dearborn Station," and "Thrill of it All".

== History ==
Fortune was founded in the late 1970s, by brothers Richard Fortune (guitar) and Mick Fortune (drums) and their singer, Richard's wife Colleen Fortune. The brothers came from a musical family—both parents were singers, and at an early age, Richard toured with Buddy Miles, Booker T. & the M.G.'s and Spirit. Mick started out as an accordion, keyboard and trombone player before switching to drums.

The first Fortune self-titled album was released by Warner Records in 1978 with follow-up singles releases including a cover of The Undisputed Truth's "Squeeze Me, Tease Me" and the original song "Saddle The Wind".

In the early 80s, keyboardist Ray Barrett and bassist David De León teamed up with the brothers, and the band began its move more toward a pop rock style. This phase of the band capped with a show at Aloha Stadium Summer Blowout 1981, where they opened for Heart and Blue Öyster Cult. The band began to receive some national attention with the 1982 Columbia Records/CBS release of "Airwaves" on The Last American Virgin motion picture soundtrack.

In late 1982, Fortune recruited keyboardist Roger Scott Craig, late of Liverpool Express. Colleen Fortune left the band and was replaced by vocalist Larry Greene who was, at the time, best known for his performance on the Top Gun soundtrack. Over the next two years, Fortune spent much of their time in the studio recording demos for CBS records and performing in clubs around Los Angeles, but they were unable to get traction and disbanded in 1984.

In 1985, Camel/MCA Records offered to release a second Fortune album. The band regrouped with Bob Birch on bass and recorded the album, also titled Fortune, which contained most of the songs recently written by Greene and Craig. The album was released, and was believed to have achieved significant sales in Europe and Japan, but the band received virtually no revenue or recognition. Camel Records then declared bankruptcy with its president, Bruce Bird, refusing to give up the masters of the album. Fortune disbanded a second time.

In 2004, Fortune's second album was re-released on Gypsy Rock Records, with three bonus tracks, including "Home Free". The album was remastered and re-released again in 2011 on AOR Heaven.

In 2016, Fortune appeared at the three-day Rockingham hard rock festival in Nottingham, as part of the set headlined by Kevin Chalfant. They returned for Rockingham 2017; one reviewer wrote: "Their reformation was one of the highlights of last year's Rockingham, and I'll have to say that they were at least equally good this year, maybe even better. Their first and so far only album is an all-time AOR classic, but I'm happy to say that there's more to come - they released a limited edition EP at Rockingham and played two new songs from it, both of which sounded really good."

In 2017, the band released a four-song, limited-edition EP. In 2019, Fortune released their third studio album, Fortune II. In 2020, they released the album The Gun's Still Smokin' Live, which was recorded at the Frontiers Rock Festival in Trezzo sull'Adda. In 2022, they released the album Level Ground. In 2023, lead singer Larry Greene passed away.
