= Anthony Crane (disambiguation) =

Anthony Crane (born 1963) is an American pornographic actor.

Anthony or Tony Crane may also refer to:

- Tony Crane (footballer) (born 1982), English footballer
- J. Anthony Crane (born 1972), American stage and screen actor
- Tony Crane (musician) (born 1945), British musician
