= Tracks (Liverpool Express album) =

Studio album by Liverpool Express
- Released: June 1976
- Recorded: 1975–1976; Zodiac Studios, London; D.J.M. Studios, London
- Genre: Rock, pop
- Label: Warner Bros.
- Producer: Hal Carter & Peter Swettenham

Liverpool Express chronology
Tracks (1976)	Dreamin' (1978)

Singles from Tracks
- 1. "Smile/Lae Mei" Released: October 1975; 2. "You Are My Love/Never Be The Same Boy" Released: May 1976; 3. "Hold Tight/Lost For Words" Released: September 1976; 4. "Every Man Must Have A Dream/Call Me Your Love" Released: December 1976; 5. "Doing It All Again/It's A Beautiful Day" Released: March 1977

Tracks is the debut studio album by Liverpool Express, released in June 1976 (UK). It features two of the band's most memorable songs, "You Are My Love" and "Every Man Must Have a Dream", both of which were Top 10 hits in Europe and South America, and Top 20 hits in the UK. Other notable hit singles were "Hold Tight" and "Smile".

The album was released on CD for the first time in 2017, along with Dreamin' and L.E.X.. Each CD was presented in a boxset with a booklet detailing the band's history and discography.

== Track listing ==
Side one

1. "Smile" (Roger Scott Craig, Billy Kinsley)
2. "Hold Tight" (Roger Scott Craig, Billy Kinsley)
3. "Never the Same Without Love" (Roger Scott Craig, Billy Kinsley)
4. "You Are My Love" (Roger Scott Craig, Billy Kinsley)
5. "She's a Lady" (Roger Scott Craig, Billy Kinsley, Tony Coates)
6. "Call Me Your Love" (Roger Scott Craig, Billy Kinsley)

Side two

1. "It's a Beautiful Day" (Roger Scott Craig, Billy Kinsley)
2. "(I Remember) Julian the Hooligan" (Roger Scott Craig, Billy Kinsley, Tony Coates)
3. "Rosemary" (Roger Scott Craig, Billy Kinsley)
4. "Doing It All Again" (Roger Scott Craig, Billy Kinsley)
5. "I'll Never Fall in Love Again" (Roger Scott Craig, Billy Kinsley)
6. "Every Man Must Have a Dream" (Roger Scott Craig, Billy Kinsley, Tony Coates)

== Personnel ==
Liverpool Express

- Billy Kinsley – lead, harmony and backing vocals, bass guitar, acoustic guitar
- Tony Coates – lead, harmony, and backing vocals, rhythm guitar, lead, acoustic guitar
- Roger Scott Craig – lead, harmony and backing vocals, piano
- Derek Cashin – lead, harmony and backing vocals, drums
