= A Beautiful Day =

A Beautiful Day may refer to:

- A Beautiful Day (1944 film), a 1944 German film directed by Philipp Lothar Mayring
- A Beautiful Day (album), a 2002 album by Andrew Hill
- "A Beautiful Day" (Dexter), an episode of the American television series Dexter
- You Were Never Really Here, a 2017 film released as A Beautiful Day in France and Germany

== See also ==
- Beautiful Day (disambiguation)
