= 1+9+8+2 =

1982

Studio album by Status Quo
- Released: 16 April 1982
- Recorded: Early 1982
- Studio: Mountain (Montreux, Switzerland)
- Genre: Rock
- Length: 39:01
- Label: Vertigo
- Producer: Status Quo

Status Quo chronology
Never Too Late (1981)	1982 (1982)	From the Makers of... (1982)

Singles from 1982
- 1. "Dear John" Released: 19 March 1982; 2. "She Don't Fool Me" Released: 4 June 1982

Professional ratings
Review scores
Source	Rating
AllMusic	2.5/5 stars
Star Pulse	2.5/5 stars
Smash Hits	6/10

1+9+8+2 (official title 1982 in some sources) is the fifteenth studio album by the British rock band Status Quo, released on 16 April 1982. It was the first to include new drummer Pete Kircher, who had recently replaced John Coghlan, and also the first to credit keyboard player Andy Bown as a full member of the band.

The album's release came shortly before the band appeared at a concert at the National Exhibition Centre, Birmingham, in the presence of the then Prince of Wales (later King Charles III). It reached No. 1 in the album chart, making it their fourth and last No. 1 album, but received an indifferent reception from fans. "Dear John", the first single and the only track not written by any of the band, reached No. 10 in the UK, but "She Don't Fool Me" stalled at No. 36.

1982 was the 20th anniversary of the band's formation, and the sum of the numbers 1+9+8+2 is 20 (shown as the Roman numerals 'XX' underneath the album title), hence the name of the album.

== Track listing ==
Side one

1. "She Don't Fool Me" (Rick Parfitt, Andy Bown) – 4:36
2. "Young Pretender" (Francis Rossi, Bernie Frost) – 3:34
3. "Get Out and Walk" (Parfitt, Bown) – 3:13
4. "Jealousy" (Rossi, Frost) – 2:55
5. "I Love Rock and Roll" (Alan Lancaster) – 3:16

Side two

6. "Resurrection" (Bown, Parfitt) – 3:49
7. "Dear John" (John Gustafson, Jackie McAuley) – 3:14
8. "Doesn't Matter" (Rossi, Frost) – 3:41
9. "I Want the World to Know" (Lancaster, Keith Lamb) – 3:23
10. "I Should Have Known" (Rossi, Frost) – 3:31
11. "Big Man" (Lancaster, Mick Green) – 3:45

=== 2006 remaster bonus tracks ===
12. "Calling the Shots" (Parfitt, Bown) (B-side of "Jealousy", released as a single in some European countries) – 4:53
13. "Hold You Back" (Live at the N.E.C.) (Rossi, Parfitt, Bob Young) – 4:40
14. "Over the Edge" (Live at the N.E.C.) (Lancaster, Lamb) – 4:20
- The two live tracks also appeared on the album Live at the N.E.C., released later the same year.

=== 2018 Deluxe Edition bonus tracks ===
Track 1 was a B-side. The remainder of the disc is a rehearsal recording, with the group trying out some cover songs.

1. "Calling the Shots" – B-Side
2. "Break the Rules"
3. "When the Girl in Your Arms (Is the Girl in Your Heart)"
4. "Half-Way to Paradise"
5. "Cathy's Clown"
6. "It's Only Make Believe"
7. "Walk on By"
8. "Singing the Blues"
9. "Jealous Heart"
10. "Down the Dustpipe"
11. "Wild Side of Life"
12. "Lover Please" / "Let's Twist Again" / "Rock 'N' Roll Music"
13. "He'll Have to Go" / "Pictures of Matchstick Men"
14. "Unspoken Words"
15. "Blueberry Hill"
16. "Gimme Some Lovin'"
17. "Time to Fly" / "Railroad"
18. "Umleitung"
19. "Someone's Learning"
20. "It Doesn't Matter Anymore"
21. "Red River Rock"
22. "Like a Good Girl" / "Mean Girl"
23. "Stay the Night"

== Personnel ==
Status Quo

- Francis Rossi – lead guitar, vocals
- Rick Parfitt – rhythm guitar, vocals
- Alan Lancaster – bass, vocals
- Andy Bown – keyboard, backing vocals
- Pete Kircher – drums, percussion

Additional personnel

- Bernie Frost – backing vocals

== Charts ==
Chart (1982)	Peak position
Australian Albums (Kent Music Report)	60
Austrian Albums (Ö3 Austria)	16
Dutch Albums (Album Top 100)	15
German Albums (Offizielle Top 100)	29
Norwegian Albums (VG-lista)	7
Swedish Albums (Sverigetopplistan)	21
UK Albums (OCC)	1

== Certifications ==
Region	Certification	Certified units/sales
United Kingdom (BPI)	Gold	100,000^{^}
^{^} Shipments figures based on certification alone.
