= Dorothy Sloop =

American jazz musician

Dorothy Sloop (September 26, 1913 – July 28, 1998), was an American jazz pianist who performed with jazz bands. A native of Ohio, her nickname was Sloopy, and she was likely the inspiration behind the song "Hang On Sloopy", written by Wes Farrell and Bert Berns, and best-known from the version recorded by the rock band The McCoys. In 1985, it became the official rock song of Ohio and is used by the Ohio State University marching band.

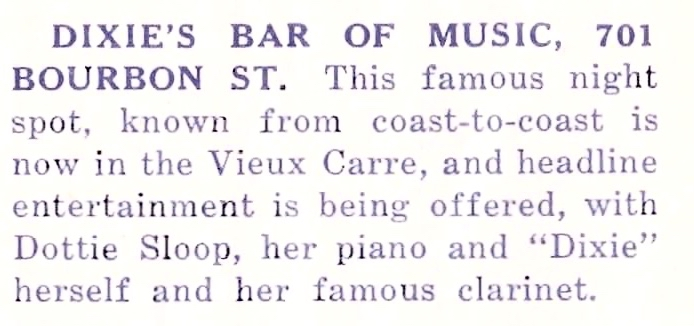
December 1948 listing for "Dixie's Bar of Music" featuring "Dottie Sloop".

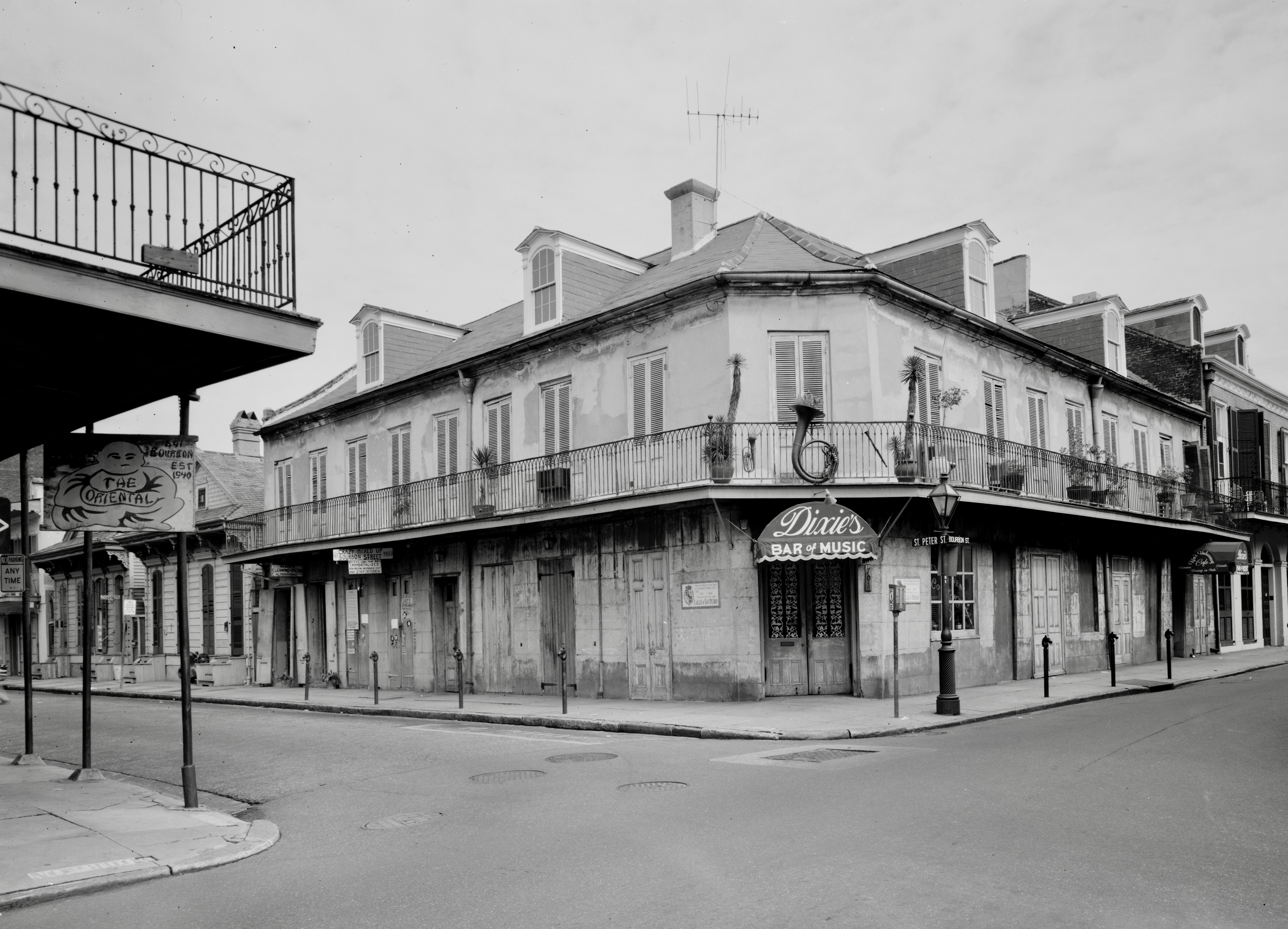
Dixie's Bar of Music on Bourbon Street, New Orleans, 1964

== Early life ==
Sloop was born into a Catholic family in Steubenville, Ohio. She learned piano as a youth and began performing in local theaters as young as age six, including a concert with another Steubenville native, Dean Martin. She studied for a year at Ohio University.

== Career ==
Sloop left college and moved to New York City where she formed a jazz quartet, the Southland Rhythm Girls, with singer and clarinetist Yvonne "Dixie" Fasnacht. They moved to Fasnacht's hometown New Orleans, Louisiana, and played in Dixie's Bar of Music, a bar on Bourbon Street owned and run by Fasnacht. In 1957, they recorded the album Dixie and Sloopy.

Sloop returned to Steubenville, where she earned her college degree and later a master's degree. For 30 years, she taught special education in St. Petersburg, Florida. She continued to perform on jazz piano into her 70s.

== Personal life ==
Sloop was married to Joe Boudreaux. They moved to Steubenville, then divorced. Their daughter Jane Heflick was given a different surname, the maiden name of one of Dorothy's grandmothers.

Dorothy Sloop died at age 84 in 1998.
