= Beautiful Day (disambiguation) =

"Beautiful Day" is a song by U2.

Beautiful Day may also refer to:

- "Beautiful Day" (Lead song), 2017
- "Beautiful Day" (Scott Weiland song), 2007
- "Beautiful Day", a 1999 song by 3 Colours Red from the album Revolt
- "Beautiful Day", a 2008 song by Kerli on the album Love Is Dead
- "Beautiful Day", a 2014 song by Jamie Grace on her album, Ready to Fly
- "Beautiful Day", a 2015 song by Jon Bon Jovi from the compilation album Finding Neverland
- "Beautiful Day", a 2016 song by TheGoodPerry on his album, Burberry Perry
- "Beautiful Day", a 2003 unreleased song by Rollergirl

== See also ==
- Ella Cara Deloria (1888-1971), also known as the Beautiful Day Woman (Ąnpétu Wašté Wįn), a Yankton Sioux educator, historian and novelist
- Beautiful Day Monster, a muppet
- A Beautiful Day (disambiguation)
- Beautiful Days (disambiguation)
- It's a Beautiful Day (disambiguation)
- "Beautiful Day Without You", 2006 song by Röyksopp
