= Honeybus =

1960s English pop group

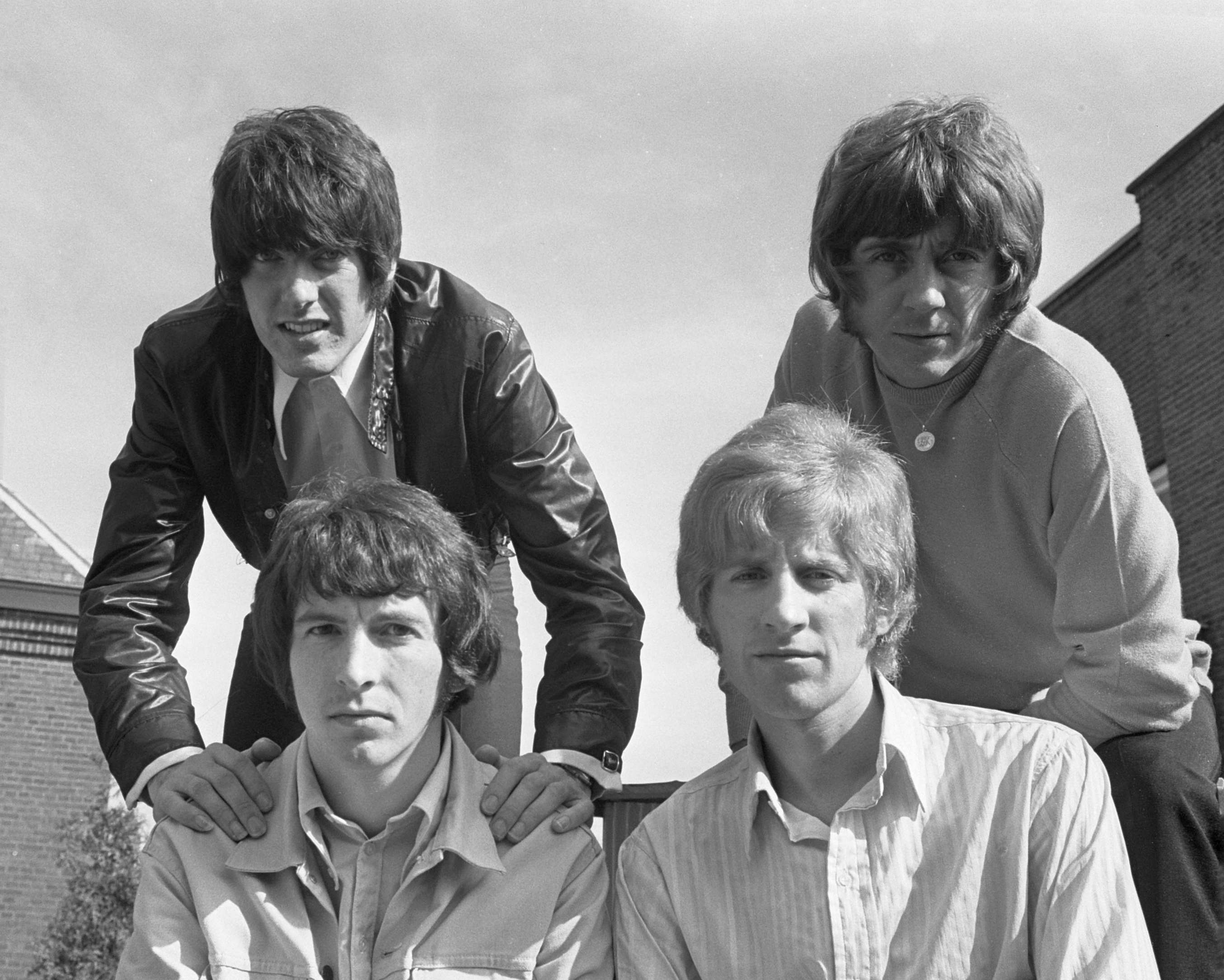
- Back: Colin Hare (left), Pete Kircher; Front: Jim Kelly (left), Ray Cane

Background information
- Origin: London, England
- Genres: Pop, baroque pop, psychedelic pop, soft rock, sunshine pop
- Years active: 1967–1969, 1971–1973
- Label: Deram Records
- Past members: Pete Dello; Ray Cane; Colin Hare; Pete Kircher; Jim Kelly; Lloyd Courtenay

Honeybus were a 1960s pop group formed in April 1967, in London. They are best known for their 1968 UK top 10 hit single, "I Can't Let Maggie Go", written by group member Pete Dello who also composed their previous single "(Do I Figure) In Your Life", later recorded by Dave Berry, Iain Matthews, Joe Cocker, Dave Stewart, Paul Carrack, Samantha Jones, Dana, Pierce Turner, and Euros Childs.

== Career ==
The band's main composers were Dello and Ray Cane although Colin Hare also contributed songs. The group's supporters and critics, amongst them Kenny Everett, compared the band to Rubber Soul-era Beatles.

Honeybus had a major hit with 1968's "I Can't Let Maggie Go", which was so popular that it earned the band a cover photo on the popular music magazine Disc and Music Echo, for which they posed atop a red London bus. "I Can't Let Maggie Go" reached Number 8 in the UK Singles Chart, in April 1968, staying in the Top 40 for over two months.

"I Can't Let Maggie Go" was also a top 10 hit in Italy, with a version made by Equipe 84, entitled "Un angelo blu" ("A blue angel"). It enjoyed an unexpected return in popularity in the 1970s, when it was used in the iconic TV jingle commercial for "Nimble", a bread produced for slimmers.

Dello resigned in August 1968. The band recruited Jim Kelly on guitar and vocals to replace him and Cane began songwriting and performing lead vocals. This line-up scored minor successes with "She Sold Blackpool Rock" and "Girl Of Independent Means". Honeybus eventually disbanded late in 1969. Their 1970 album Story, without an active band to promote it, failed to chart. However, it is now highly collectable and has sold around £1,000 in mint condition. It has since been re-issued on compact disc.

Kircher left the group in the summer of 1969 and went on tour with Engelbert Humperdinck. He was replaced by drummer Lloyd Courtney for the remainder of the sessions for their debut album.

The Dello line-up of the band reunited in 1971 to record a new body of songs for the Bell Records label and a complete LP, Recital, for the British division of Warner Bros. Records. A change in management at Warner Brothers meant that Recital was never issued. It was, however released finally on vinyl by Hanky Panky & Mapache records in 2018.

The band were the subject of a 2003 documentary on the Dutch TV show "Single Luck", a show about the careers of artists who are considered one hit wonders in the Netherlands; interviews by Dello, Kircher, Hare, Terry Noon (band manager) and Neville Mackinder (bassoon player on "I Can't Let Maggie Go") were filmed.

== Aftermath ==
Dello, Hare and Kelly all went on to record solo material in the early 1970s that was critically acclaimed but failed to achieve significant commercial success.

Jim Kelly:

Kelly released a solo single in 1969 on Deram entitled "Mary Mary" b/w "Rev. Richard Bailey", both written by Cane, but it failed to chart. Kelly joined the Sleaz Band in the 1970s and they released "All I Want Is You" on the Fontana label. An album was also recorded, but never released. He died on Boxing Day in 1995 following a long illness.

Pete Kircher and Ray Cane:

Kircher's drumming career saw him joining several bands, among them Compass with Billy Bremner, Roger Rettig and Brian Hodgson, Shanghai, John Scott Cree, Liverpool Express, Original Mirrors and Status Quo. He retired from the music industry after Quo's appearance at Live Aid.

Ray Cane lives in Australia.

Pete Dello and Colin Hare:

Pete Dello and Colin Hare both recorded solo albums for “Penny farthing” “Into your ears” and “March Hare” respectively. Featuring members of the Honeybus. ”Into your ears being re-issued years later by Hanky Panky records. “March Hare has enjoyed at least five re-issues in Tokyo, Korea, Spain and UK. Kelly’s single “Mary Mary”/ “Reverend Richard Bailey” written and produced by Cane was also released around the same time.

After a number of years out of the spotlight, Hare, having accompanied Dello at the Felipop music festival in Galicia, Spain in 2002 recorded new solo material in 2004. Also, later an EP “Down from Pitswood” featuring two original and long forgotten Honeybus songs, “Incredibly bad” and “Follow the plan” which were first recorded for BBC Radio sessions in the late 1960’s. - In 2007, Hare performed at several venues including Valencia, Barcelona, Bilbao and Madrid with Duncan Maitland and Jon Wigg.

== Lineup ==
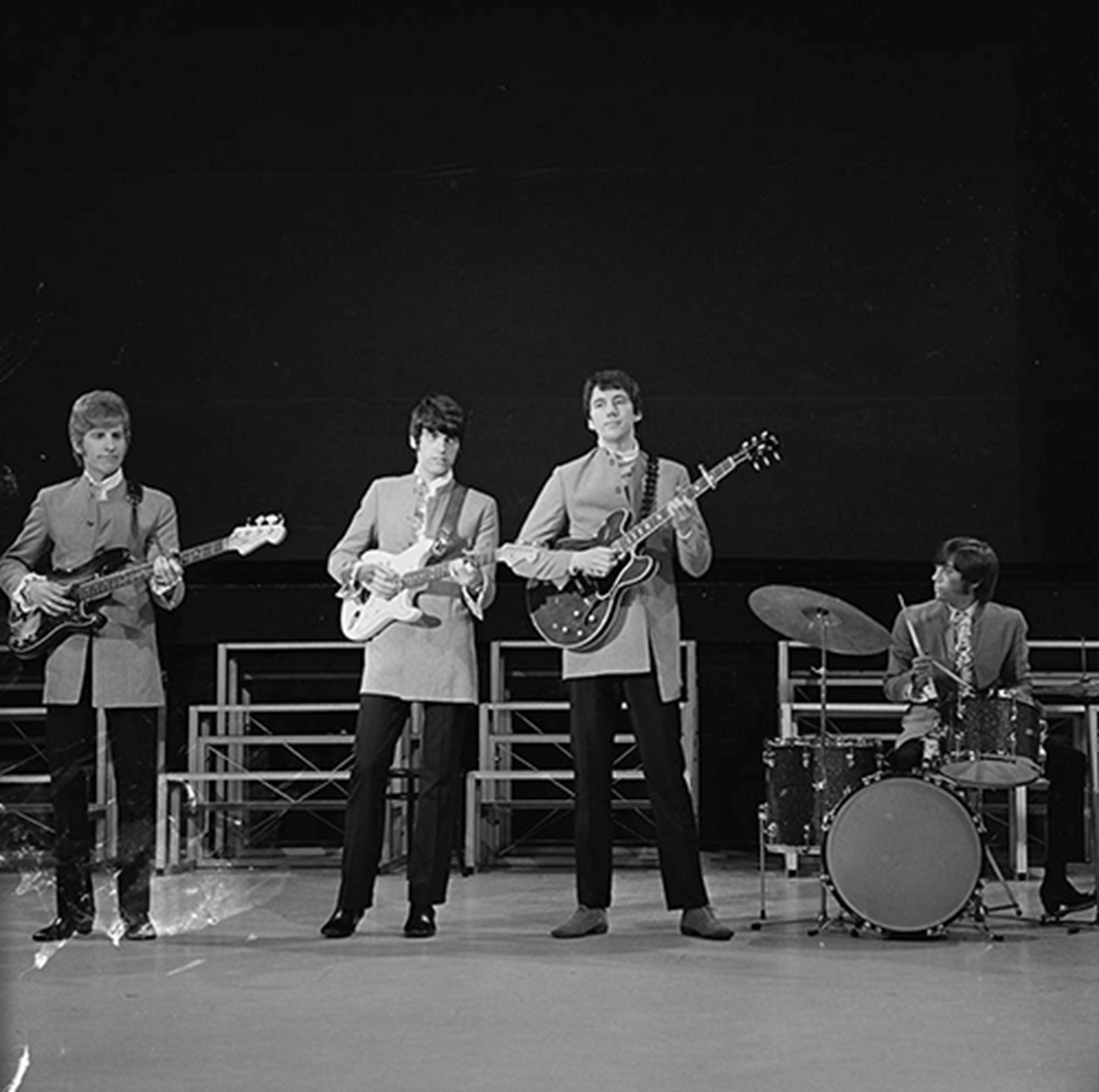
Honeybus (Dutch TV, 1968)

The best known line-up consisted of:

- Pete Dello (born Peter Blumsom, 26 May 1942, Oxford, Oxfordshire) — vocals, keyboards, guitar (1967—1968, 1971—1973)
- Ray Cane (born Raymond John Byart, 15 September 1943, Hackney, East London) — vocals, bass, keyboards (1967—1969, 1971–1973)
- Colin Hare (born Colin Nicholas Hare. 4 June 1946, Combe, near Bath, Somerset) — rhythm guitar, vocals (1967—1969, 1971–1973)
- Pete Kircher (born Peter Derek Kircher, 21 January 1945, Folkestone, Kent) — drums, vocals (1967—1969, 1971—1973)
- Jim Kelly (born James Kelly, 19 December 1946, Dundee, Scotland – died 26 December 1995, Dundee, Scotland) — lead guitar, vocals (1968—1969)
- Lloyd Courtenay (born 20 December 1944, Wallasey, Cheshire) — drums (only recording for Story album) (1969)

== Discography ==
=== Original albums ===
- 1970 Story
- 1973 Recital (Note: unreleased by Warner Bros. although promo copies exist which have sold for $800 or even £2761,[2] Finally issued on the Hanky Panky & Mapache record label in July 2018)

=== Posthumous compilation albums ===
- 1989 Honeybus At Their Best
- 1993 Old Masters, Hidden Treasures
- 1997 At Their Best
- 1999 The Honeybus Story
- 2002 She Flies Like a Bird: The Anthology (features previously unreleased songs such as "Big Ship")

=== Singles ===
Year	Label	Songwriter	A-side	B-side	UK	Dutch
1967	Deram Records	A-side: Pete Dello B-side: Ray Cane	"Delighted to See You"	"The Breaking Up Scene"	X	X
1967	Deram Records	A-side: Pete Dello B-side: Ray Cane	"(Do I Figure) In Your Life"	"Throw My Love Away"	X	X
1968	Deram Records	Both by Pete Dello	"I Can't Let Maggie Go"	"Tender Are the Ashes"	8	5
1968	Deram Records	A-side: Ray Cane B-side: Pete Kircher/Ray Cane/Colin Hare	"Girl of Independent Means"	"How Long"	X	14
1969	Deram Records	A-side: Ray Cane B-side: Colin Hare	"She Sold Blackpool Rock"	"Would You Believe"	X	X
1969	Decca Records	Both by Ray Cane	"La Cicogna"	"Chi Sei Tu"	X	X
1972	Deram Records	Both by Ray Cane	"Story"	"The Right to Choose"	X	X
1972	Bell Records	A-side: Pete Dello B-side: Colin Hare	"She Is the Female to My Soul"	"For Where Have You Been"	X	X
1973	Warner Music Group	Both by Pete Dello	"For You Baby"	"Little Lovely One"	X	X

=== Reissues ===
Year	Label	Songwriters	A-side	B-side
1976	Decca Records	All three by Pete Dello	"I Can't Let Maggie Go"	"Julie in My Heart"
1982	Decca Records	All three by Pete Dello	"I Can't Let Maggie Go"	"Tender Are the Ashes"

== Other sources ==
- Mojo Collection 3rd. Edition - Story; Honeybus - Best albums of the '70s.
