= Dear John (Status Quo song) =

1982 single by Status Quo

Single by Status Quo

from the album 1+9+8+2
- Released: 19 March 1982
- Genre: Rock
- Length: 3:12
- Label: Vertigo
- Songwriter(s): Jackie McAuley, John Gustafson
- Producer(s): Status Quo

Status Quo singles chronology
"Rock 'n' Roll" (1981)	"Dear John" (1982)	"She Don't Fool Me" (1982)

"Dear John" is a single released by the British rock band Status Quo in 1982. It was included on the album 1+9+8+2.

== Track listing ==
1. "Dear John" (Jackie McAuley/John Gustafson) (3.12)
2. "I Want the World to Know" (Alan Lancaster/Keith Lamb) (3.21)

== Charts ==
Chart (1982)	Peak position
Belgium (Ultratop 50 Flanders)	18
Ireland (IRMA)	10
Netherlands (Dutch Top 40)	22
Netherlands (Single Top 100)	24
UK Singles (OCC)	10
