= The Strangeloves =

American band

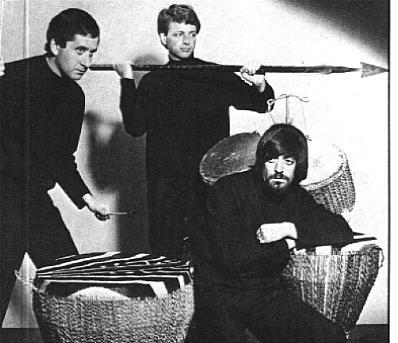
- 1964 press shot

Background information
- Also known as: Strange Loves
- Origin: New York City, New York, United States
- Years active: 1964–1969; 2018
- Label: Motown
- Past members: Bob Feldman; Jerry Goldstein; Richard Gottehrer

The Strangeloves were a band created in 1964 by the New York-based American songwriting and production team of Bob Feldman, Jerry Goldstein, and Richard Gottehrer. They initially pretended to be from Australia. The Strangeloves' most successful singles were "I Want Candy," "Cara-Lin", and "Night Time".

== History ==
Before the invention of the Strangeloves, Feldman and Goldstein had been working together as songwriters since 1959, and recorded a couple of non-charting singles as the duo Bob & Jerry in 1961–62. From 1959 to 1961 they were members of various non-charting studio-based recording groups such as Bobbi and the Beaus, Ezra and the Iveys, and the Kittens. They linked up with Gottehrer in 1962, formed FGG Productions, and scored hits for other artists including 1963's "My Boyfriend's Back" by the Angels. By 1964, the girl group sound in which FGG Productions specialized was going out of fashion, due to the prevalence of British Invasion-style beat groups. To keep up with market trends, FGG decided to create a ready-made foreign beat group themselves.

Deciding that they could not convincingly fake British accents, they opted to pretend to be Australians. According to the press releases and publicity material issued about the group, the Strangeloves were three brothers named Giles, Miles, and Niles Strange, who were raised on an Australian sheep farm. The brothers' fictional backstory involved getting rich with the invention of a new form of sheep crossbreeding (the long-haired "Gottehrer" sheep allegedly registered with the Feldman-Goldstein Company of Australia), which allowed them the time and financial freedom to form a band. In publicity photographs, the three posed in zebra-striped vests and with African drums, Gottehrer later commenting: "Nobody in the US in 1965 really knew any Australians." The story did not exactly capture the public's imagination, but the Strangeloves' singles still performed respectably well, especially in the United States. Similarly in 1969, Crazy Elephant was promoted in Cash Box magazine as allegedly being a group of Welsh coal miners.

The Strangeloves' first single, as the Strange Loves, "Love, Love (That's All I Want from You)", reached No. 122 on the US Billboard Hot 100. The group's subsequent releases were as the Strangeloves.

When their second single, "I Want Candy", written and produced in collaboration with Bert Berns at Bang Records, became a hit in the middle of 1965, the Strangeloves found themselves in the unfamiliar and uncomfortable position of performing live. This short-lived experience was followed by a road group composed of four session musicians who had helped to record the Strangeloves' songs. The musicians in the initial road group were bassist/vocalist John Shine, guitarist Jack Raczka, drummer Tom Kobus, and saxophonist/vocalist Richie Lauro.

In early 1966, the road lineup was replaced by a trio of FGG studio musicians that more closely adhered to the founding concept: guitarist Jack Raczka (Giles Strange), drummer/vocalist Joe Piazza (Miles Strange), and keyboardist/vocalist Ken Jones (Niles Strange). In 1968, bass player Greg Roman became an integral part of the band. All studio material continued to be performed by Feldman, Goldstein and Gottehrer, with additional session musicians as required.

While performing on the road in Ohio in 1965 as the Strangeloves, Feldman, Goldstein, and Gottehrer came upon a local band, Ricky Z and the Raiders, led by Rick Derringer (who was Rick Zehringer at the time). Recognizing their raw talent, the producers immediately brought the band to New York, recorded Derringer's voice over an existing music track from the Strangeloves' album, I Want Candy, and released "Hang On Sloopy" as a single under the name the McCoys.

The Strangeloves' only LP, I Want Candy, was released in 1965 on Bang Records, with several of the album tracks having been released as singles. Other singles by the Strangeloves appeared on Swan Records and Sire Records.

The Strangeloves continued recording singles, with moderate American success, through 1968. In their "home" country of Australia, they only scraped the bottom of the singles charts, but a real Australian group, Johnny Young & Kompany, had a hit in Australia in 1966 with a cover of the Strangeloves' "Cara-Lin" (retitled "Cara-Lyn").

The FGG trio also collaborated on a charting 1965 single credited to the Beach-Nuts, and took on the guise of the Sheep for two charting singles in 1966. Feldman and Goldstein (without Gottehrer) also recorded charting hits in 1966 as Rome & Paris, and in 1969 as the Rock & Roll Dubble Bubble Trading Card Co. of Philadelphia 19141. On his own, Goldstein wrote, produced and arranged a 1966 solo single, "Watch The People Dance," under the name Giles Strange, which failed to chart. Feldman and Gottehrer also issued a non-charting 1970 single ("Right On" b/w "Shakey Jakes") as the Strange Bros. Show.

The following credit appeared on most Strangeloves records (as well as several other records produced by FGG): "arranged and conducted by Bassett Hand." Bassett Hand was a tongue-in-cheek pseudonym for the band's creators. Two instrumental singles credited to Bassett Hand were released around the time the Strangeloves were getting started: "In Detroit" (1964) and "The Happy Organ Shake" (1965). Neither single charted nationally, although "In Detroit" appeared on a Chicago top-40 list as an "Up 'N' Coming" song in October 1964.

In December 2018, after a gap of over 50 years, the band participated in a one-off reunion, backed by the band Yo La Tengo, at a surprise show at the Bowery Ballroom in New York City.

== Post-Strangeloves careers ==
Their songs have been recorded by David Bowie, Bauhaus, The J. Geils Band, The Fleshtones, Aaron Carter, George Thorogood, and Bow Wow Wow.

Gottehrer went on to fame as a record producer of early CBGB performers including Richard Hell and the Voidoids, the Fleshtones, and Blondie, as well as being the co-founder of Sire Records along with Seymour Stein. He also worked with Robert Gordon, who was one of many who revitalized rockabilly in the late 1970s, and produced the critically acclaimed first album by Marshall Crenshaw. In the 1980s he continued with successful albums by the Bongos, their frontman Richard Barone, the Go-Go's and many others. He later founded the influential independent distribution company the Orchard.

In his role as a producer and manager, Goldstein also continued to have an effect on the music world. He suggested to the band Nightshift that they team up with Eric Burdon, which became War, and had the Circle Jerks on his Far Out Productions management company and LAX record label.

All three members of the Strangeloves appeared in interviews in the feature documentary film BANG! The Bert Berns Story, which was co-directed by Bert Berns' son Brett Berns, together with Bob Sarles.

Bob Feldman died on August 23, 2023, nine days after his 83rd birthday.

== Backing band ==
Road group (1965)

John Shine (vocals and bass guitar)
Jack Raczka (guitar)
Tom Kobus (drums & vocals)
Richie Lauro (sax & vocals)

Road group (1966-1968)

Ken Jones (a.k.a. Niles Strange) (vocals & keyboards)
Jack Raczka (a.k.a. Giles Strange) (guitar)
Joe Piazza (a.k.a. Miles Strange) (drums & vocals)

== Discography ==
=== LPs ===
- I Want Candy (1965 - Bang Records)

=== Charted singles ===
| Release Date | Title | Chart positions | | | Notes |
| Release Date | Title | US Hot 100 | Australia | Canada RPM 100 | Notes |
| 1964 | "Love, Love" | 122 | | | Credited to Strange Loves |
| 1965 | "I Want Candy" | 11 | | 7 | |
| 1965 | "Out in the Sun" | 106 | | | Credited to The Beach-Nuts. The Beach-Nuts were The Strangeloves and The Angels. |
| 1965 | "Cara-Lin" | 39 | 100 | | |
| 1965 | "Night Time" | 30 | 98 | | |
| 1966 | "Hide and Seek" | 85 | | | Credited to The Sheep. |
| 1966 | "Because of You" | 104 | | | Credited to Rome & Paris. Rome & Paris were Bob Feldman and Jerry Goldstein. |
| 1966 | "I Feel Good" | 130 | | | Credited to The Sheep. |
| 1966 | "Hand Jive" | 100 | | | |
| 1968 | "Honey Do" | 120 | | | |
| 1969 | "Bubble Gum Music" | 74 | | 52 | Credited to The Rock & Roll Dubble Bubble Trading Card Co. Of Philadelphia 19141. The Rock & Roll Dubble Bubble Trading Card Co. of Philadelphia 19141 were Bob Feldman and Jerry Goldstein. |
