= She Don't Fool Me =

1982 single by Status Quo

Single by Status Quo

from the album 1+9+8+2
- Released: 4 June 1982
- Genre: Rock
- Length: 4:30
- Label: Vertigo
- Songwriter(s): Parfitt/Bown
- Producer(s): Status Quo

Status Quo singles chronology
"Dear John" (1982)	"She Don't Fool Me" (1982)	"Caroline (Live)" (1982)

"She Don't Fool Me" is a single released by the British rock band Status Quo in 1982. It was included on the album 1+9+8+2.

== Track listing ==
1. "She Don't Fool Me" (Parfitt/Bown) (4.30)
2. "Never Too Late" (Rossi/Frost) (3.57)

== Charts ==
Chart (1982)	Peak position
UK Singles (OCC)	36
