= Beautiful Days =

Beautiful Days may refer to:

- Beautiful Days (festival), an annual music festival in Devon, England
- "Beautiful Days" (song), a song by Japanese boy-band Arashi
- Beautiful Days (TV series), a 2001 South Korean television drama series
- Beautiful Days (album), a 2006 album by Kyla
- Beautiful Days (2018 film), a South Korean film
- Beautiful Days (1935 film), a French comedy film
- "The Beautiful Days, a 1996 Swans song from Soundtracks for the Blind

== See also ==
- Beautiful Day (disambiguation)
