= Yvonne "Dixie" Fasnacht =

American musician and bar owner

- Born: 1910; New Orleans, Louisiana, US
- Died: November 13, 2011 (age 100–101) Metairie, Louisiana, US
- Genres: Swing music
- Occupations: Musician, bar owner
- Instruments: Clarinet, saxophone, drums, vocals
- Award: Lifetime Achievement Award at the Gay Appreciation Awards

Yvonne "Dixie" Fasnacht (1910–November 13, 2011) was a musician in the United States. She ran Dixie’s Bar of Music in New Orleans with her sister Irma Fasnacht from 1939 to 1964.

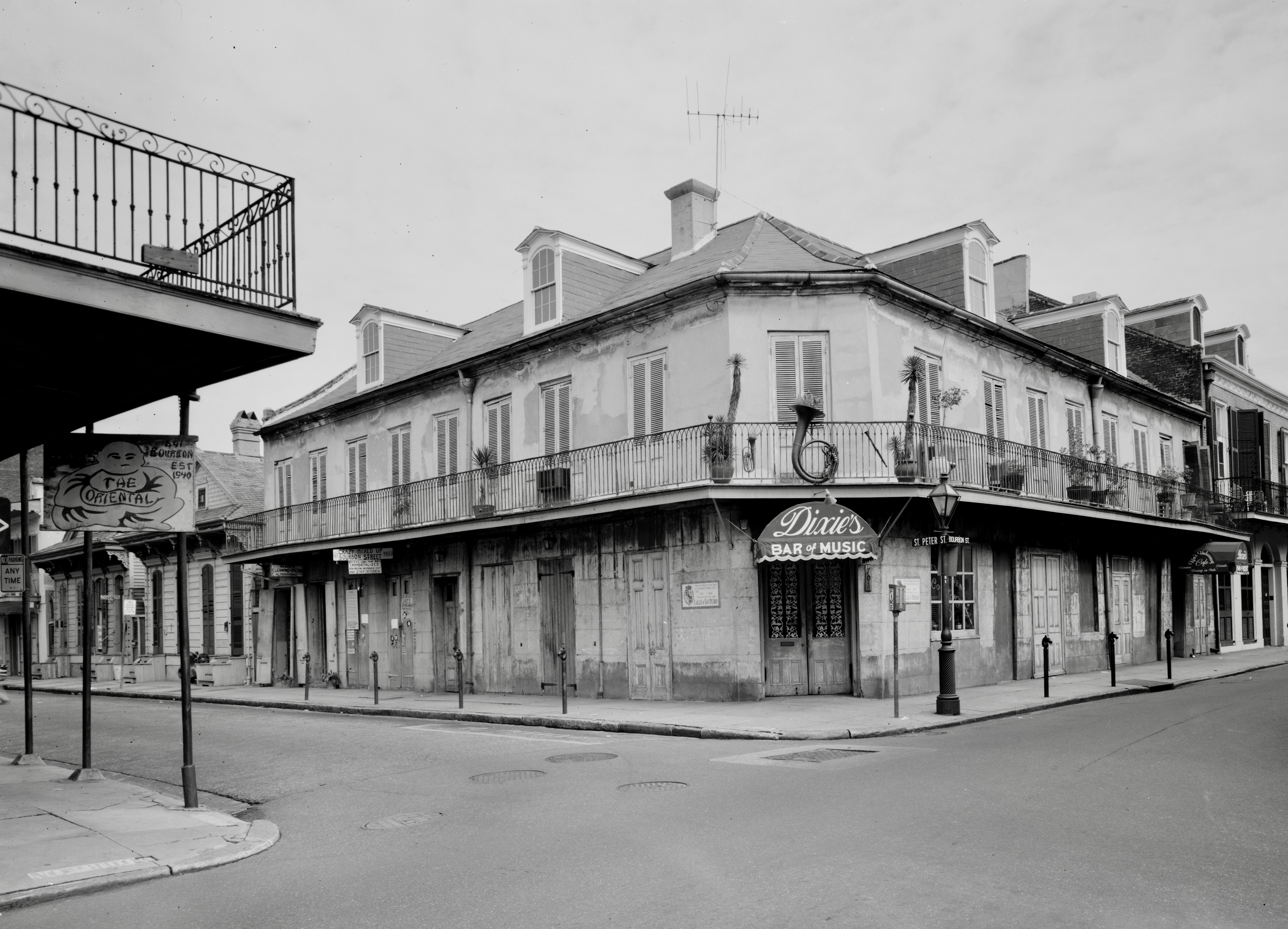
Dixie's Bar of Music on Bourbon Street in New Orleans, 1964

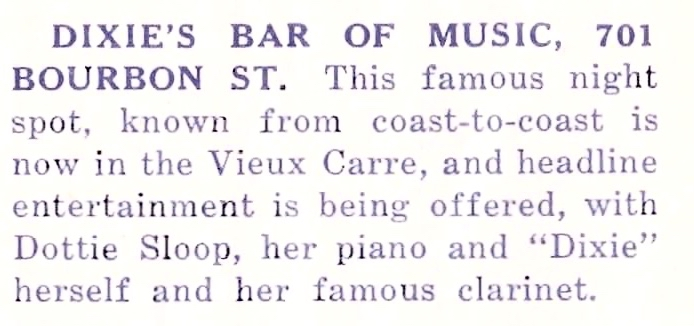
December 1948 listing for "Dixie's Bar of Music" featuring "Dottie Sloop"

== Early life ==
She was born on LaHarpe Street in New Orleans to Julia Almont Fasnacht and Caroll P. Fasnacht. After her mother died of brain cancer, she was largely raised by her older sister Irma.

== Career ==
She was a swing musician who played the clarinet, saxophone, and drums. Her first band was the all-female Harmony Maids. She briefly toured with the band The Smart Set before returning to New Orleans, where she would form a group known as both the Sophisticates of Swing and the Southland Rhythm Girls. It consisted of her on clarinet and vocals, Judy Ertle on the trumpet, Betty Giblin on the piano, and Maxine Phinney on the bass. They traveled to Chicago and New York, played as a house band at a New York Club, and performed in Speedy Justice, a musical short directed by Milton Schwarzwald.

At some point after 1938, Betty Giblin was replaced by Dorothy Sloop as pianist. In 1957, Sloop and Fasnacht recorded the album Sloopy Time along with drummer Maeceil Peterson.

== Dixie's Bar of Music ==
She and her sister also ran a bar called Dixie's Bar of Music. The first one opened in 1939 on Saint Charles Avenue in New Orleans. Fasnacht played there regularly in addition to working as a hostess.

After World War Two, the sisters moved their bar to Bourbon Street. This new location was known for being open to both gay and straight patrons. It was one of the first bars in New Orleans to openly welcome gay men, who she referred to as the "cuff link set." The bar closed in 1964.

== Legacy ==
Yvonne Fasnacht was one of two Honorary Grand Marshals for the 19th New Orleans Gay Pride Parade in 1989. In 1997, she received a Lifetime Achievement Award at the Gay Appreciation Awards (GAA) Gala.

She lived on Bourbon Street well into her 90s, and died in Metairie, Louisiana, at age 101. She never married, and some sources have referred to her as a lesbian.
