= Sorrow (The McCoys song) =

1965 song by the McCoys

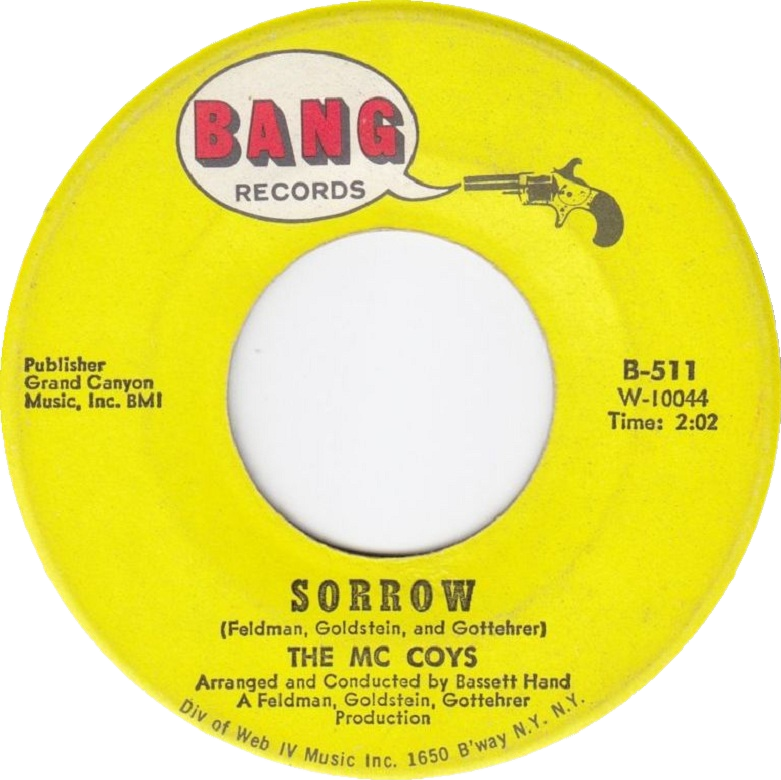

Single by the McCoys

from the album Hang On Sloopy
- A-side: "Fever"
- Released: October 1965
- Genre: Folk rock
- Length: 2:02
- Label: Bang 511
- Songwriters: Bob Feldman, Jerry Goldstein, Richard Gottehrer
- Producers: Bob Feldman, Jerry Goldstein, Richard Gottehrer

The McCoys singles chronology
"Hang On Sloopy" (1965)	"Sorrow" / "Fever" (1965)	"Up and Down" (1966)

"Sorrow" is a song first recorded by the McCoys in 1965 and released as the B-side to their cover of "Fever". It became a big hit in the United Kingdom with a cover version by the Merseybeats, reaching number 4 on the UK chart on 28 April 1966. A version by David Bowie charted worldwide in 1973.

A line from the song – "With your long blonde hair and your eyes of blue" – is used in the Beatles song "It's All Too Much" which was featured on their 1969 album Yellow Submarine.

== The Merseys version ==
"Sorrow"

Single by the Merseys
- B-side: "Some Other Day"
- Released: April 1966
- Genre: Pop rock
- Length: 2:12
- Label: Fontana 694
- Songwriters: Bob Feldman, Jerry Goldstein, Richard Gottehrer
- Producer: Kit Lambert

The Merseys singles chronology
"Sorrow" (1966)	"So Sad About Us" (1966)

The Merseys' version is more up-tempo than the McCoys' folk-rock original. Propelled by Clem Cattini's drumming, it features a powerful horn arrangement. The horns also take the solo which, on the McCoys version, is performed on harmonica. As the number and quality of subsequent covers demonstrate, the Merseys' single was highly regarded among British musicians.

=== Charts ===
Chart (1966)	Peak position
Ireland (IRMA)	7
UK Singles (Official Charts)	4

== David Bowie version ==
"Sorrow"

Single by David Bowie

from the album Pin Ups
- B-side: "Amsterdam" (Brel, Shuman)
- Released: 28 September 1973
- Recorded: July 1973
- Studio: Château d'Hérouville, Hérouville, France
- Genre: Folk rock; glam rock
- Length: 2:53
- Label: RCA
- Songwriters: Bob Feldman; Jerry Goldstein; Richard Gottehrer
- Producers: Ken Scott; David Bowie

David Bowie singles chronology
"Life on Mars?" (1973)	"Sorrow" (1973)	"Rebel Rebel" (1974)

Official audio"Sorrow" (2015 Remaster) on YouTube

David Bowie's remake of "Sorrow", recorded in July 1973 at Château d'Hérouville, Hérouville, France, was the only single released in the UK from his Pin Ups covers album, reaching No. 3 on the UK Singles Chart, and staying in the charts for 15 weeks. It was also Bowie's first number one hit single in Australia, where it topped the charts for two weeks in February 1974.

The B-side, "Amsterdam", was a cover of a Jacques Brel song that Bowie had been performing live since 1968. Bowie may have recorded the song in the summer 1973 sessions for Pin Ups or in late 1971 for the album Ziggy Stardust. Never selected as an album track, it was used as the single B-side as it fitted with "Sorrow". In France, it was billed as the A-side of the single.

"Sorrow" was featured in the 2008 John Cusack film War, Inc. In 2017, Paul Shaffer and Jenny Lewis released a cover version based on Bowie's version.

=== Track listing ===
1. "Sorrow" (Bob Feldman, Jerry Goldstein, Richard Gottehrer) – 2:53
2. "Amsterdam" (Jacques Brel, Mort Shuman) – 2:39

The Spanish release of the single had "Lady Grinning Soul" as the B-side.

=== Personnel ===
According to Chris O'Leary:

- David Bowie – lead and backing vocals, 12-string acoustic guitar, tenor saxophone
- Mick Ronson – lead guitar, backing vocal, string arrangement
- Trevor Bolder – bass guitar
- Aynsley Dunbar – drums
- Mike Garson – piano
- Ken Fordham – baritone saxophone
- G. A. MacCormack – backing vocals
- Unknown musicians – violins, violas, celli

Technical

- David Bowie – producer
- Ken Scott – producer
- Dennis MacKay – engineer

=== Charts ===
Chart (1973–74)	Peak position
Australia (Go-Set)	1
Belgium (Ultratop 50 Wallonia)	7
Canada Top Singles (RPM)	77
French Singles Chart	7
Ireland (IRMA)	2
Iceland Singles Chart	3
Netherlands (Single Top 100)	29
New Zealand (Listener Chart)	1
South Africa (Springbok Radio)	1
UK Singles (Official Charts)	3
West Germany (GfK)	39

== Certifications ==
Certifications for "Sorrow"
Region	Certification	Certified units/sales
New Zealand (RMNZ)	Gold	15,000^{‡}
United Kingdom (BPI)	Silver	250,000^{^}
^{^} Shipments figures based on certification alone.^{‡} Sales+streaming figures based on certification alone.
