= Roger Scott Craig =

Irish musician

- Born: 12 November 1952 (age 73); Kilrea, County Londonderry, Northern Ireland
- Genres: Rock; pop; AOR; melodic rock
- Occupations: Musician; singer; songwriter; record producer
- Instruments: Piano; keyboards; vocals
- Years active: 1970–present

Roger Scott Craig is a Northern Irish musician, songwriter, and composer. He is a former member of the rock bands Liverpool Express, Fortune, Nina Hagen, Harlan Cage, and 101 South.

== Liverpool Express ==
Roger started his career with the band The Merseybeats in the early 1970s, along with members Tony Crane, Derek Cashin, and Tony Coates. They continued to perform under the name "Tony Crane and The Merseybeats" until leaving in 1975 to form the Liverpool Express. Roger invited Billy Kinsley to join the band, whom Roger saw performing in clubs at the time and admired Billy's singing voice.

Liverpool Express experienced chart success with a song "You Are My Love", mentioned by Paul McCartney as one of his favourite love songs, as well as "Every Man Must Have A Dream", "Dreamin'", "Hold Tight", and "Smile". They toured the UK and Europe supporting Rod Stewart, and continued to release hit songs.

Their greatest success came in South America where they scored two consecutive number one hits. They toured Brazil in mid 1977. Arriving at Rio de Janeiro Airport, the band were greeted by thousands of hysterical fans.

According to the band's official website, in early 1978 Prince Charles specifically requested that Liverpool Express perform for him at The Royal Gala Performance to be held at the Empire Theatre in Liverpool. The band were introduced to the Prince and were photographed with him after the show.

== Fortune/Nina Hagen ==
Craig left Liverpool in 1981 to settle in California. He joined the band Fortune in 1982, after auditioning for several bands, including Foreigner. Craig recorded one album with Fortune, their eponymous 1985 record. All but one of the songs on the album was written by Roger S. Craig. This album has become something of a cult classic.

After this period he joined Nina Hagen's band, and appeared on her 1985 album, In Ekstase. They toured Europe and South America and played at the Rock in Rio concert in Brazil. She went through various keyboard players when Roger quit her band, only to hire him again at a later date.

== Soundtracks ==
During the 1990s, Craig wrote music for movies such as The Pelican Brief, Wyatt Earp, and Richie Rich as well as TV commercials.

== Harlan Cage ==
Craig, along with musician Larry Greene, formed the band Harlan Cage in the mid-nineties, and they recorded and released successful albums into the 2000s. The band became a cult classic in the Pomp Rock world.

== 101 South ==
Roger later formed a new band, 101 South, in 2000 and they recorded three albums together. 101 South comprises the fulmination of the creativity from all the songs he wrote throughout his life, starting with those songs he wrote for Liverpool Express, Fortune, and Harlan Cage. Roger was able to attract musicians at this point of his career, such as Ian Bairnson (guitarist). His primary choice of vocalist was Gregory Lynn Hall, he had found other musicians who he believed to be specialists in their fields, such as Alan Jeffrey, an emotive saxophone player.

== Liverpool Express Reunion ==
The original line-up of Liverpool Express were reunited in August 2002, followed by global fan interest. This lead Roger to compile and release "The Best of Liverpool Express", which featured a brand new song, a tribute to The Beatles titled "John George Ringo & Paul". A reunion concert in Liverpool shortly followed with Roger appearing on stage with current band members, Billy Kinsley, Kenny Parry, and Dave Goldberg. A year later, Craig and Kinsley met in Liverpool to write and record new material for the album, "Once Upon A Time", which they self-produced.
