= Hang On Sloopy =

1965 single by The McCoys

"My Girl Sloopy"

Single by the Vibrations
- B-side: "Daddy Woo Woo"
- Released: 1964
- Recorded: 1964
- Genre: R&B; garage rock
- Length: 2:53
- Label: Atlantic
- Songwriters: Wes Farrell; Bert Berns

"Hang On Sloopy" (originally "My Girl Sloopy") is a 1964 song written by Wes Farrell and Bert Russell. Rhythm and blues vocal group the Vibrations were the first to record the tune in 1964. Atlantic Records released it as a single, which reached No. 26 on the Billboard Hot 100 chart. The song is associated with Ohio State University and is Ohio's official rock song.

The song became standard fare for garage bands and, in 1965, it became one of the first songs recorded by the Yardbirds with guitarist Jeff Beck. A version by the rock group the McCoys was the most successful when it reached number one in the U.S. singles chart in October 1965. Recordings by additional artists also reached the charts, including versions in Spanish and Portuguese.

By one account, the inspiration for the song was Dorothy Sloop, a jazz singer from Steubenville, Ohio, and a student at Ohio University in Athens.

== The McCoys version ==
"Hang On Sloopy"

Single by the McCoys
- B-side: "I Can't Explain It"
- Released: July 1965
- Studio: Bell Sound (New York City)
- Genre: Garage rock
- Length: 2:57; 3:50 (unedited version)
- Label: Bang
- Songwriters: Wes Farrell; Bert Berns
- Producers: Bob Feldman; Jerry Goldstein; Richard Gottehrer

The McCoys singles chronology
"Hang On Sloopy" (1965)	"Fever" (1965)

In early 1965, the Strangeloves, a New York City rock band, wanted to make the song the follow-up to their hit single "I Want Candy" and began performing it in concert. However, the Dave Clark Five, with whom they were touring, told the Strangeloves that they were going to record their own version when they returned to England, copying the Strangeloves' arrangement. The Strangeloves realized that the Dave Clark Five's cut would likely be a hit, but they were not yet ready to release a new single because they were still enjoying the success of "I Want Candy" from a few months earlier.

The answer presented itself when a young rock group named Rick and the Raiders opened, and provided backing, for the Strangeloves in July in Dayton, Ohio. The Strangeloves, three writer-producers from Brooklyn, New York City, recruited Rick and the Raiders to record the song under their name. The Raiders' 17-year-old lead singer, Rick Zehringer, was flown to Bell Sound Studios in New York to record his lead vocal over the Strangeloves' already-recorded backing tracks. It was then decided to change the name of Rick and the Raiders to the McCoys to avoid any confusion with Paul Revere & the Raiders, a popular band at the time. Zehringer also began using the stage name Rick Derringer. The single was issued on Bang Records and entered the U.S. and Canadian charts on August 14, 1965, reaching the top position in early October. The McCoys' version reached no. 5 in the UK. Contrary to the Strangeloves' expectations, the Dave Clark Five version was never even released.

Originally written and recorded with three verses, the retitled "Hang On Sloopy" was edited down to two verses for the single and for the Hang On Sloopy album. Record World responded positively: "Teens will hang on to this new Bang slice, since the rhythmic song about a hard luck girl is riveting." The unedited three-verse version, at 3 minutes, 50 seconds, first appeared on Bang's 1970 various artists compilation, Bang & Shout Super Hits (BLPS-220). It was also included in Rhino Records' 1991 various artists compilation Grandson of Frat Rock! Vol. 3 and in Legacy Recordings' 1995 compilation Hang On Sloopy: The Best of the McCoys.

== Legacy ==
=== The Yardbirds ===
In 1964, Eric Clapton, who was then lead guitarist for the Yardbirds, introduced the group to the Vibrations' "My Girl Sloopy". Before they could record the tune, however, Clapton left the group. During his second recording session on April 13, 1965, with the Yardbirds, new guitarist Jeff Beck and the group recorded the song at the Advision Studios in London. Their 5:36 rendition was considered unusual for a studio recording at the time; AllMusic's Bruce Eder called it "the first extended jam to emerge on record from a band on the British blues scene". Group chronicler Greg Russo also commented on the group's "humorous take [in which they] used out of control vocal buildups", which was part of their live performances, such as at the fifth Richmond National Jazz and Blues Festival on August 6.

When looking for material for the Yardbirds' first American album, manager Giorgio Gomelsky included "My Girl Sloopy" and two other tracks recorded at Advision with Beck. The hastily produced For Your Love album was released on July 5, 1965, to generate interest for the group's upcoming first U.S. tour. On August 11, the three songs formed the Yardbirds' first extended play (EP) release in the UK, where it reached number two on the record chart.

=== Other charting versions ===
- Little Caesar and the Consuls released a version of the song in 1965 that reached No. 50 on the Billboard pop chart and No. 3 in Canada.
- The Ramsey Lewis Trio recorded the song for their 1965 live album Hang On Ramsey!; it reached No. 6 on the U.S. R&B chart, No. 11 on the U.S. pop chart, No. 18 on the U.S. adult contemporary chart, No. 37 on the Canadian pop charts, and No. 2 on the Canadian AC charts.
- "Es Lupe", a Spanish-language cover version by Los Johnny Jets, was released in 1965. It topped the Mexican charts for 13 weeks.
- Leno & Lílian, a Brazilian vocal duo, released a cover version in Portuguese (“Pobre Menina”) in January 1966 that topped the Brazilian charts.
- The Lettermen released a version of the song in 1970 that reached No. 18 on the U.S. adult contemporary chart and No. 93 on the Billboard Hot 100.
- Rick Derringer released a version of the song in 1975 that reached No. 94 on the Billboard Hot 100 and No. 81 in Canada. The 1975 version, a track on his Spring Fever album and also a 45 RPM single, omitted some of the original lyrics and added steel drums and vibes. This 1975 release was also made into an early music film/video featuring dancer Lisa Leonard Dalton. Nineteen years of age at the time, she had been the 1974 dance champion at Gazzarri's nightclub on the Sunset Strip.
- The Sandpipers released a version of the song in 1976 that reached No. 32 on the UK singles chart.

=== In sports ===
The song gained an association with Ohio State University after its marching band began playing it at football games. It first played the song October 9, 1965, after a staff arranger, John Tatgenhorst, begged the director to try playing it. After finally convincing the director, Tatgenhorst prepared an arrangement and the band played the song in front of the stadium. After the crowd reaction, the band began to play it at every game. The song is traditionally played during the transition from the 3rd quarter to the 4th quarter at Ohio Stadium. Since then, "Sloopy" has been appearing on the band's CDs and was available as a free download on its website. A vocal performance excerpt is also available for download on the university's website. Later it became the official rock song of the State of Ohio and Ohio State University. In April 1985, Joe Dirck, columnist for the Columbus Citizen-Journal, saw a wire service story about a proposal to designate "Louie, Louie" as the official State song of Washington, and he subsequently wrote a series of tongue-in-cheek columns. He even registered as a lobbyist for the resolution. Dirck played bass guitar in rock bands and knew the McCoys, particularly Rick Derringer. He said it was a good fit because the McCoys were from the Dayton area, and the Ohio State University Marching Band had adopted it as an unofficial anthem. Both the public and its elected officials—most importantly, the 116th Ohio General Assembly became aware their State lacked an official song as a result of the exposure from his commentary. They designated "Hang On Sloopy" as the state rock song by House Concurrent Resolution 16 on November 20, 1985.

"Hang On Sloopy" is also a signature song for Major League Baseball's Cleveland Guardians, who play at Progressive Field in Cleveland, Ohio, typically played during the middle of the 8th inning. The song also plays at the end of the 3rd quarter at Huntington Bank Field during every Cleveland Browns game, and is also played at Cleveland Cavaliers games at Rocket Mortgage FieldHouse. During games it is common for fans to yell "O-H-I-O!" following the chorus.

== Bibliography ==
- Eder, Bruce (2003). "For Your Love". In Bogdanov, Vladimir; Woodstra, Chris; Erlewine, Stephen Thomas (eds.). All Music Guide to the Blues. San Francisco: Miller Freeman Books. ISBN 0-87930-424-3.
- Hicks, Michael (2000). Sixties Rock: Garage, Psychedelics and Other Satisfactions. Urbana, Illinois: University of Illinois Press. ISBN 0-252-02427-3.
- Lyttle, Eric (September 2003). "The Real Story of Hang On Sloopy". Columbus Monthly.
- Russo, Greg (2016). Yardbirds: The Ultimate Rave-Up. Floral Park, New York: Crossfire Publications. ISBN 978-0-9791845-7-4.
- Shannon, Bob; Javna, John (1986). "Hang On Sloopy – The McCoys". Behind the Hits. New York: Warner Books. p. 228. ISBN 9780446389372.
- Whitburn, Joel (1988). "The Vibrations". Top R&B Singles 1942–1988. Menomonee Falls, Wisconsin: Record Research. ISBN 0-89820-068-7.
