= The Showstoppers =

American soul group

- Origin: Philadelphia, Pennsylvania, United States
- Genres: R&B, soul
- Years active: 1967–1972
- Labels: Showtime, Guyden, Heritage, MGM, Beacon.
- Past members: "Alex" Burke "Laddie" Burke; Earl Smith; Timmy Smith

The Showstoppers (alternatively the Show Stoppers) were a four-piece American vocal soul group formed in Philadelphia in about 1967. They are best remembered for their 1967 hit, "Ain't Nothin' But a Houseparty", which was the debut release on three record labels: Showtime Records, Heritage Records, and Beacon Records.

== History ==
The Showstoppers was formed about 1967 by brothers, Elec Edward "Alex" Burke and Vladimir H. "Laddie" Burke who were the two oldest of the five younger brothers of Atlantic Record's star Solomon Burke, who joined with fellow Germantown High School students, brothers Earl and Timmy Smith. The Burke brothers had been in show business since at least 1957 as part of a four-member group with two of their two younger brothers.

=== "Ain't Nothin' But a House Party" (1967) ===
After rehearsing under the guidance of Solomon Burke, they modeled themselves initially on the Vibrations. After signing to local Philadelphia label Showtime Records, the Showstoppers had a couple of local hit singles in Philadelphia. Their 1967 hit "Ain't Nothin' But a Houseparty" b/w "What Can a Man Do?" (STR 101), sold well in Pittsburgh, and New York City, and sold about 40,000 copies in Philadelphia, and reached No. 118 on the Billboard chart on May 27, 1967. The session musicians on the song included Carl Chambers, who was later drummer with Gladys Knight & the Pips, Joe Thomas, who went on to become the guitarist with the Impressions, and Motown's Mike Terry on baritone sax.

By early 1968, the Antiguan-born American businessman Milton Samuel, the head of Beacon Records, a small independent record label started in January 1968 in the London suburb of Willesden, who was later Antigua and Barbuda's Ambassador to the UK and the founder of the Bank of Antigua, purchased the UK leasing rights for "Ain't Nothing But a House Party" for only £30. On February 16, 1968, "Ain't Nothing But a House Party" became the first release on Beacon Records, In March 1968 Samuel and Mike Berry of Apple Records had negotiated a deal for "Ain't Nothing But a House Party" to be released through a newly created Milton Apple Music, but the inability to locate one of the Beatles to approve the deal forced Samuel to make alternate arrangements. Initially distributed through the British Independent Record Distributors Network, "Ain't Nothing But a House Party" caught on with DJs in the UK, and spent 16 weeks in the chart, debuting at No. 57 on March 2, 1968, before entering the Top 40 at No. 38 on March 23, 1968. By the end of March, Samuel organized a British visit for the Showstoppers. The Showstoppers made the first of their three appearances on the British television program Top of the Pops on April 18, 1968. According to one British source, "Ain't Nothing But a House Party" "was played to death and back to life at the Twisted Wheel and Blue Note Club in Manchester", and peaked at No. 11 on May 4, 1968, in the UK Singles Chart. Later in May 1968 "Ain't Nothin' But a House Party" was released in Germany on Ariola Records and France on Barclay Records, and later released by Beacon in Scandinavia, the Benelux countries, Austria, Italy, Japan and New Zealand.

Jerry J. Ross, the head of newly created Heritage Records, heard about "Ain't Nothin' But a House Party" and decided to buy the master recording in 1968, and he also signed the Showstoppers to his label, became their manager, and organized MGM to distribute its re-release in the US. Despite rights being acquired for national release by MGM, it failed to become a national hit, spending 5 weeks in the Billboard Hot 100, peaking at No. 87 on June 22, 1968. It was ranked No. 20 on the Soul Brothers Top 20 on August 15, 1968.

"Ain't Nothin' But a House Party" was a disco hit (#33) in 1971.

Regarded as a Northern soul classic, the song has been covered by the Tremeloes (1968); the Paper Dolls; Cliff Richard on his album Cliff: Live at the Talk of the Town (1970); the J. Geils Band, who had a No. 2 AOR US hit with it in 1973; Noel McCalla in 1979; and Phil Fearon, who recorded a house music version produced by Stock Aitken Waterman in 1986 that reached No. 60 in the UK chart. "Ain't Nothing But a House Party" was covered in 1988 by British "supergroup" the Corporation.

=== "Eeny Meeny" (1968) ===
All of the Showstoppers subsequent singles were produced by Indian-British producer Biddu and recorded by Beacon Records in England. The Showstoppers' follow-up single, "Eeny Meeny" b/w "How Easy the Heart Forgets" (Heritage HE 802), was released in September 1968 in the US, but it failed to chart there. On November 7, 1968, the Showstoppers appeared on Beat! Beat! Beat!, a West German television show, where they lip synched "Ain't Nothin' But a House Party" and their new release, "Eeny Meeny". After Milton Samuel negotiated a deal in October 1968 to distribute Beacon Records recordings through EMI, on November 13, 1968 "Eeny Meeny", (MGM 1436), entered the UK chart, where it spent the next seven weeks, peaking at No. 33.

=== Later releases (1968–1972) ===
The Showstoppers released several more singles, including "Shake Your Mini" (1968); and 1969's "Just A Little Bit Of Lovin'" b/w "School Prom" (Beacon BEA 130), however none achieved chart success.

Chart success in the UK and Europe "created demand not only for the record but for live appearances as well". As the Showstoppers had disbanded, Jerry Ross sent a different group on an entire tour of the UK and Europe as the Show Stoppers, which was a group later known as the Persuaders, who would later score with "Thin Line Between Love and Hate". Eventually the authentic Showstoppers traveled to Europe and were well received.

On January 17, 1971, the Showstoppers performed at the Twisted Wheel Club in Manchester, England. The Showstoppers made their third and final appearance on Top of the Pops on February 28, 1971, singing the disco version of "Aint' Nothing But a House Party".

After their own tour of Europe, and in the absence of any other hit records, the Showstoppers disbanded finally about 1972.

== Group members ==
- Alex Burke (born 1948) – vocalist
- Laddie Burke (born 1949) – vocalist
- Earl Smith (born 1949) – lead vocalist
- Fleming Tinsley "Timmy" Smith III (born February 1, 1948, Boston, Massachusetts – died May 12, 2013, Heatherwood Nursing And Subacute Center, Newport, Rhode Island) – vocalist
