= I Can't Let Maggie Go =

Single by Honeybus
- B-side: "Tender Are the Ashes"
- Released: 1 March 1968
- Genre: Baroque pop
- Label: Deram
- Songwriter: Pete Dello
- Producer: P. Blumsom

Honeybus singles chronology
"(Do I Figure) In Your Life" (1967)	"I Can't Let Maggie Go" (1968)	"Girl of Independent Means" (1968)

"I Can't Let Maggie Go" is a song by the British pop group Honeybus from early 1968. Written by band member Pete Dello, it was released as a non-album single.

The song became an international Top 20 hit, reaching number 13 in New Zealand and number 11 in Ireland. It did best in their native United Kingdom, where it reached number eight in the UK Singles Chart.

== Chart history ==
=== Weekly charts ===
Chart (1968)	Peak position
Ireland (IRMA)	11
Netherlands (Single Top 100)	5
New Zealand (Listener)	13
UK (The Official Charts Company)	8

=== Year-end charts ===
Chart (1968)	Rank
UK	100

== Later uses ==
"I Can't Let Maggie Go" was included on the group's later compilation LPs, Honeybus at Their Best and Old Masters Hidden Treasures.

In the 1970s, the song was used as a TV commercial jingle for "Nimble", a bread produced for slimmers.

== Cover versions ==
The song was also a top 10 hit in Italy, with a 1968 version made by Equipe 84, entitled "Un angelo blu" ("A blue angel").

A 1969 cover by The Birds reached number 4 in Perth, Australia.

"I Can't Let Maggie Go" has been covered by J. Vincent Edwards in 1974, as well as by the Sideburns in 1993. David Essex included his own version on the 2005 compilation album The Complete Collection.
