= Pete Dello =

English singer and songwriter (1942–2026)

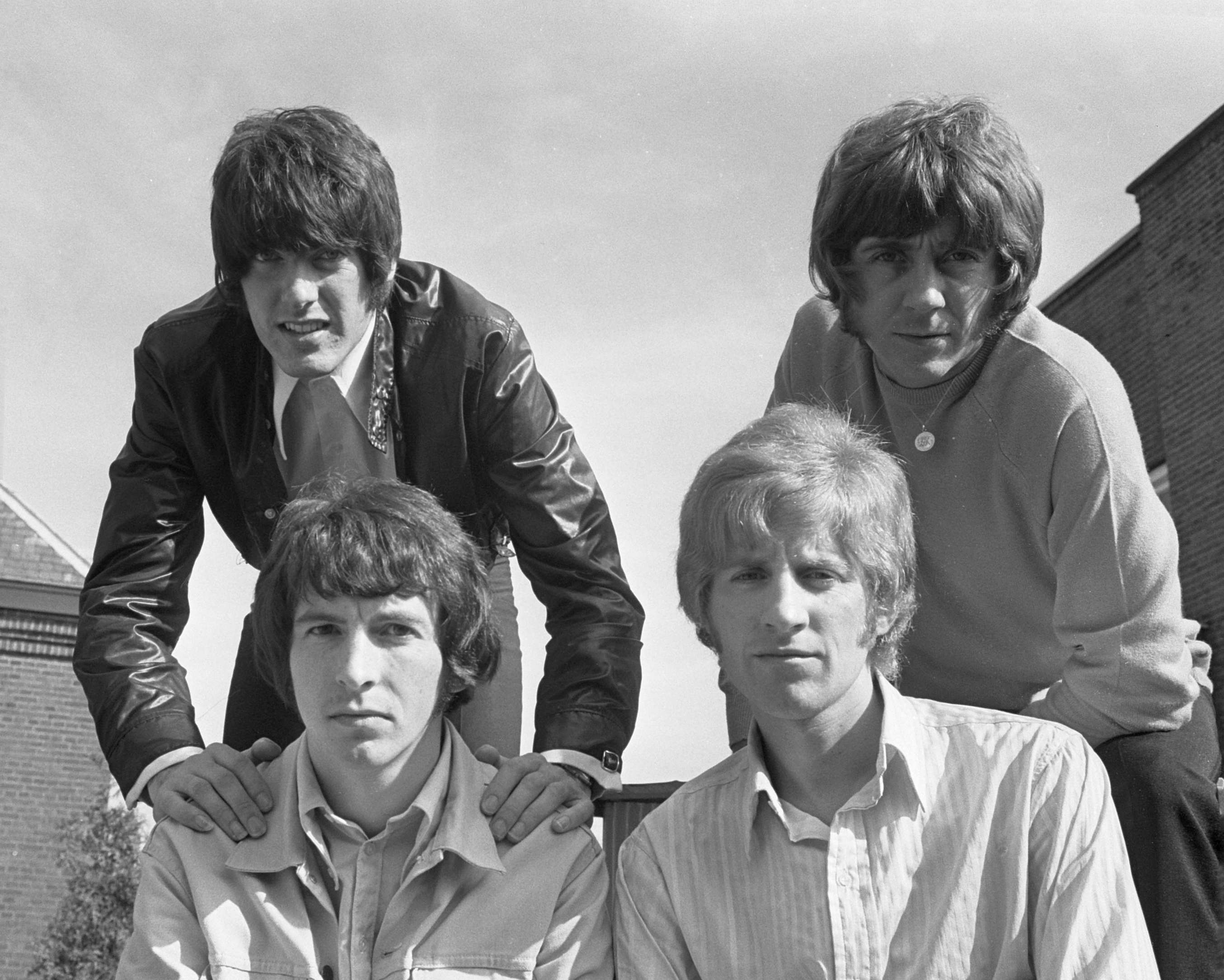
- Honeybus, 1968. Back L-R: Colin Hare and Pete Kircher. Front L-R: Pete Dello and Ray Cane

Background information
- Born: Peter James Blumsom; 26 May 1942; Oxford, England
- Died: 21 February 2026 (aged 83) London, England
- Genres: Pop; beat
- Occupations: Musician; songwriter; record producer
- Instruments: Guitar; keyboards
- Years active: Early 1960s–early 1970s
- Labels: Decca; Deram; Penny Farthing
- Formerly of: Honeybus

Peter James Blumsom (26 May 1942 – 21 February 2026), known professionally as Pete Dello, was an English singer-songwriter who was popular during the 1960s and 1970s, including as lead singer of the band Honeybus. He was later a music teacher.

== Career ==
Dello started his career as a musician in the skiffle era of the 1950s and was a founding member of the rock and roll band Grant Tracy and The Sunsets, after which he joined Steve Darbishire's backing group, The Yum Yum Band, in the mid-1960s. This led onto him forming Honeybus, with whom he scored the hit single "I Can't Let Maggie Go" in 1968.

Quickly leaving Honeybus rather than tour and promote the single, he next cut a solo album Into Your Ears in 1971, and also worked with John Killigrew. Ultimately he quit the music industry for other interests during the 1970s. Since then Into Your Ears has become a collectable album, with copies selling for over £1,200 in perfect condition. It has also been re-issued on compact disc in 2005, and again in 2009.

He wrote songs with all his bands (and also for The Applejacks). The Dello-penned song "Do I Still Figure In Your Life?" has been covered by Dave Berry, Joe Cocker, Iain Matthews, Dave Stewart, Paul Carrack, Dana, Kate Taylor, Saturday's Crowd and Pierce Turner. His co-writer was Ray Cane. Dello was also a session musician, and he was hired for Unit 4 + 2, The Scaffold and The Roulettes.

The song "I'm a Gambler" by Lace (1969) was reissued as a single under the pseudonym Red Herring in 1973.

Dello's biggest success "I Can't Let Maggie Go" was given a second round of popularity when it was used for a 1970s Nimble Bread TV commercial, which brought him much welcomed royalties which he successfully invested.

== Death ==
Dello died in London on 21 February 2026, at the age of 83.

== Discography ==
=== Singles ===
Sunsets

- 1961 "Cry Of The Wild Goose"

Grant Tracy & The Sunsets

- 1961 "Say When"
- 1961 "Pretend"
- 1962 "The Great Matchmaker"
- 1962 "Taming Tigers"
- 1963 "Everybody Shake"

Steve Darbishire and the Yum Yum Band

- 5 Decca singles 65–67

Honeybus

- 1967 "Delighted To See You"
- 1967 "Do I Still Figure In Your Life?"
- 1968 "I Can't Let Maggie Go"
- 1973 "For You"

Lace

- 1969 "I'm A Gambler/Go Away"

Magic Valley

- 1969 "Taking The Heart Out Of Love/Uptight Basil"

Leah

- 1973 "Arise, Sir Henry/Uptight Basil"

Red Herring

- 1973 "I'm A Gambler/Working Class Man"

Magenta

- 1974 "I'm A Gambler/Tattered Robe"

=== Albums ===
- 1964 Teenbeat (Grant Tracy and the Sunsets)
- 1971 John Killigrew (John Killigrew with Pete Dello)
- 1971 Into Your Ears (Pete Dello And Friends)
- 1973 Recital (Honeybus) – comeback album (unreleased although promo copies exist and sell for upwards of £800)
- 2018 Recital (Honeybus) – Hanky Panky Records reissue

Notable compilations

- 1989 Honeybus at Their Best (Honeybus)
- 1993 Old Masters, Hidden Treasures (Honeybus)
- 1997 At Their Best (Honeybus)
- 1999 The Honeybus Story (Honeybus)
- 2002 She Flies Like A Bird : The Anthology (features unreleased songs such as "Big Ship") (Honeybus)
- 2018 Where Have You Been: The Lost Tracks Of Honeybus (Honeybus)
