= Richard Gottehrer =

American songwriter (born 1940)

- Born: June 12, 1940 (age 86); The Bronx, New York, U.S.
- Education: Adelphi University
- Occupations: Music producer, music executive
- Years active: 1960–present
- Awards: 2019 Music Biz Outstanding Achievement Award

Richard Gottehrer (born June 12, 1940) is an American songwriter, record producer and record label executive.

His career began as a Brill Building songwriter in the 1960s. His first number one record as a songwriter and producer was "My Boyfriend's Back" by the Angels, followed by other hits like "Hang On Sloopy" by the McCoys and "I Want Candy" by the Strangeloves, of which the latter Gottehrer was a member. In 1966, he formed Sire Records with Seymour Stein. His career continued as producer for the Go-Go's' 1981 debut album, Dr. Feelgood, Richard Hell, the Bongos and Moonpools & Caterpillars' first release with a major label, 1995's Lucky Dumpling. In 1997, he co-founded The Orchard with business partner Scott Cohen, an independent music distribution company.

== Personal life ==
Richard Gottehrer was born in the Bronx, New York on June 12, 1940. He graduated from Taft High School. He pursued a B.A. in history at Adelphi University, spent one year at Brooklyn Law School, then pursued a career in the music industry. Gottehrer is Jewish.

== Career ==
Gottehrer came to prominence as a songwriter in the 1960s. His more notable songs are "My Boyfriend's Back" and "I Want Candy". As Feldman-Goldstein-Gottehrer (FGG Productions), he wrote various songs with Jerry Goldstein and Bob Feldman, including "Sorrow", also by the McCoys, later covered by David Bowie on his Pin Ups album. In 1964, Feldman, Goldstein and Gottehrer created an allegedly Australian beat group called the Strangeloves. In 1966, Gottehrer founded Sire Records with Seymour Stein.

By the 1970s, he had progressed to record production, and was responsible for the debut albums by Blondie and the Go-Go's. Among the other artists produced by Gottehrer were Marshall Crenshaw, Richard Hell and the Voidoids, Joan Armatrading, the Fleshtones, the Bongos, Richard Barone, Mental as Anything, Robert Gordon, Link Wray, Dr. Feelgood and short-lived, electro-punk outfit Chiefs of Relief. In 1997, Gottehrer founded the Orchard, a digital music distribution company.

In 2010, he produced Dum Dum Girls' debut album I Will Be, and continued producing them until the band broke up. He also joined the 9th annual Independent Music Awards judging panel to assist independent musicians' careers.
