= Billy Kinsley =

English musician (born 1946)

- Born: William Ellis Kinsley; 28 November 1946 (age 79); Anfield, Liverpool, England, UK
- Genres: merseybeat
- Instruments: bass, vocals
- Years active: 1960–present
- Member of: Liverpool Express
- Formerly of: The Merseybeats

William Ellis Kinsley (born 28 November 1946) is an English musician who was lead vocalist and bassist with the Merseybeats until 1966 (although he temporarily left the band to form the Kinsleys). The group disbanded in January 1966 to resurface as the Merseys duo. They recorded the McCoys' song "Sorrow" (also covered by David Bowie on his 1973 cover album, Pin Ups) with the band before embarking on a solo career, where he recorded "Bye Bye Baby" (not to be confused with a Four Seasons track of a similar title), a typical Merseybeat tune, followed by the singles "Annabella," and "You Make My Day."

== Early life ==
William Ellis Kinsley was born in Anfield, Liverpool.

== Career ==
Kinsley formed the Mavericks in 1960 with Tony Crane. They became the Pacifics in 1961 and then the Merseybeats in 1962. They were signed to Fontana Records and in 1964, Billy left the band to form his group, the Kinsleys. After an album release with John Gustafson, he returned by the end of the year. The Merseybeats ended in 1966, and Kinsley and Crane carried on as the rock duo the Merseys. Their first single was a major hit, a cover of the McCoys' "Sorrow," which reached number 4 in the UK Singles Chart. They had a backing band called the Fruit Eating Bears, which included guitarist Joey Molland, later of Badfinger.

The Merseys ended in 1969, and Kinsley, Crane and a new lineup of performers recreated the Merseybeats. Kinsley left the band in 2020, and Crane carries on the band's legacy with his band Adrian.

His session work notably included working for Apple Records (alongside George Harrison on at least one song for Jackie Lomax). He also worked on the popular Top of the Pops record series, which contained anonymous cover versions of recent and current hit singles. During this time, he worked with fellow musician friend Jimmy Campbell and formed the band Rockin' Horse. They recorded one album and toured England and Europe as the backing band for Chuck Berry.

Kinsley later formed Liverpool Express in the mid-1970s, and again experienced chart success with "You Are My Love", mentioned by Paul McCartney as one of his favourite love songs, plus "Every Man Must Have A Dream", "Dreamin", "Hold Tight," and "Smile." They toured the UK and Europe supporting Rod Stewart, released more singles, and found popularity in South America (they were the first band to play large stadiums in Brazil). They had quite a few hit singles all over South America, and three of their singles ("You Are My Love", "Dreamin," and "Every Man Must Have A Dream") reached No. 1 in the charts. In 1978, they played at the Royal Gala Performance at the request of Prince Charles at the Empire Theatre in Liverpool. After three albums and more single releases the following year, they had no further chart success.

Kinsley formed a side band, the Cheats, with members Kenny Parry (guitar) and Brian Rawling (drums), playing pubs and clubs in and around Merseyside. In the mid-1980s, Phil Chittuck joined the band in place of Rawling, and they released the following two singles (as Liverpool Express): "So What" and "If You're Out There." Kinsley later took on more session work. Then most notably he joined (with old friend Kenny Parry) the Pete Best Band, with whom he recorded a live album Live At The Adelphi (recorded in 1988), and on which he plays bass and sings lead vocal and is credited with "editing" (the album was not released until the 1990s) as well as working on a single ("Heaven"). In the mid-1990s, Kinsley re-joined the Merseybeats. In 1999, he joined the Pete Best Band and recorded Casbah Coffee Club, where he produced and sang lead vocals, played bass, and rhythm guitar (once again bringing along his friend Kenny Parry to play lead guitar on some tracks). Liverpool Express recorded an album in 2003, Once Upon a Time, which followed a best of album, and a single, a tribute to the Beatles, titled "John George Ringo & Paul".

In 2009, Spencer Leigh of BBC Radio Merseyside produced a four-part radio series about Kinsley's career, entitled It's Love That Really Counts. The series featured interviews with Kinsley and others, and music from his career. A book was also issued under the same title, as well as a CD featuring new recordings.

== Discography ==
The Merseybeats

(See Merseybeats discography at The Merseybeats)

(See Liverpool Express discography at Liverpool Express discography)
