= The Merseybeats =

English beat band

- Also known as: The Mavericks (1960–1961); The Pacifics (1961–1962); The Merseys (1966–1969)
- Origin: Liverpool, England
- Genres: Pop, beat
- Years active: 1960–1966; 1966–1969 (as the Merseys); 1969–present
- Labels: Fontana, various
- Members: Tony Crane; Adrian Crane
- Past members: Former members
- Website: merseybeats.co.uk

The Merseybeats (sometimes written as the Mersey Beats) are an English band that emerged from the Liverpool Merseybeat scene in the early 1960s, performing at the Cavern Club along with the Beatles, Gerry and the Pacemakers, and other similar artists.

The group's original members were Tony Crane (vocals, lead guitar), Billy Kinsley (vocals, bass), Aaron Williams (rhythm guitar) and John Banks (drums). Kinsley left the group at the beginning of 1964 and was replaced by John Gustafson, though Kinsley returned at the end of that year. The group split in 1966, with Crane and Kinsley continuing as a duo dubbed the Merseys. The Merseys ended in 1969. During the 1970s and 1980s, the Merseybeats would stage several occasional reunions before reforming permanently in 1993.

The current line-up is Tony Crane and his son Adrian Crane on keyboards and lead guitar.

== History ==
=== The Merseybeats ===
Originally called the Mavericks, the band was formed by singer/guitarist Tony Crane and singer/bassist Billy Kinsley in late 1960. They became the Pacifics in September 1961. They were renamed the Mersey Beats in February 1962 by Bob Wooler, MC at the Cavern Club. In April 1962, they became the Merseybeats. By now Crane and Kinsley had joined up with guitarist Aaron Williams and drummer John Banks. Pete Best was offered a position in the group by Brian Epstein after being dismissed from the Beatles, but turned it down.

They signed a recording contract with Fontana Records and had their first hit single in 1963 with "It's Love That Really Counts", followed in 1964 by their million-selling record "I Think of You", which gained them their first gold disc. They suffered a setback in February 1964 when Kinsley left to form his own band, the Kinsleys. He was temporarily replaced by Bob Garner (later of the Creation) and permanently by Johnny Gustafson, formerly of the Big Three.

With Gustafson they had two more major hits during 1964, "Don't Turn Around" and "Wishin' and Hopin'", and released their only album in the latter part of that year. Kinsley returned to the group at the end of 1964. Gustafson would go on to co-form the band Quatermass, and would spend the 1970s working with Roxy Music and the Ian Gillan Band, as well as playing on the original Jesus Christ Superstar album.

The Merseybeats appeared regularly at Liverpool's Cavern Club, and they claim to have appeared there with the Beatles on more occasions than any other band from that era. They were also successful abroad, touring in Germany and the US in 1964, and having their own Merseybeats Show on Italian television.

=== The Merseys ===
During 1965, their initial success waned, and, after a few more singles the band folded in early 1966. Crane and Kinsley continued as a vocal duo called the Merseys. They had a major hit with their first single, a cover of the McCoys' "Sorrow", which reached Number 4 in the UK Singles Chart. The introduction on the record featured a bowed bass played by Jack Bruce. A line from this song, "with your long blonde hair and eyes of blue," is included in the Beatles' "It's All Too Much", released in 1969 as part of the Yellow Submarine soundtrack album. David Bowie covered the song on his 1973 album Pin Ups, from which it was released as a single and reached Number 3 in the UK Singles Chart. The duo split in 1969, with Crane and Kinsley both going on to front several other bands.

=== Tony Crane and The Merseybeats ===
During the 1970s, Crane continued to tour and perform live as Tony Crane and the Merseybeats with various line-ups.

=== Liverpool Express ===
See Liverpool Express

=== The Merseybeats re-formed ===
The Merseybeats' original drummer John Banks died on 20 April 1988, at the age of 44.

Kinsley and Crane re-formed the Merseybeats in 1993 and, after celebrating 45 years in the music industry in 2006, they continued to tour and perform on the 'sixties circuit', and at venues in the UK and across Europe. Kinsley departed in 2020, leaving the band in the hands of Crane and his son Adrian.

Former bassist and vocalist John Gustafson died on 12 September 2014, at the age of 72.

== Members of the Merseybeats (1961–1966, 1969–present) ==
Current members

- Tony Crane – lead guitar, lead vocals (1961–1966, 1969–present)
- Adrian Crane – keyboards, lead guitar (2000–present)

Former members

- John Banks – drums (1962–1966)
- Aaron Williams – rhythm guitar, backing vocals (1962–1966)
- Billy Kinsley – bass, lead vocals, rhythm guitar (1961–1964, 1964–1965, 1993–2020)
- Bob Garner – bass guitar, lead vocals (1964)
- Johnny Gustafson – bass, lead vocals (1964)
- Ken Mundye – drums (filled in for Banks for a few gigs during 1965)
- Chris Finley – keyboards, backing vocals (1969–1986)
- Derek Cashin – drums (1969–1974)
- Tony Coats – bass, backing vocals (1969–1974)
- Bob Packham – bass, backing vocals (1974–2021)
- Allan Cosgrove – drums (1974–2000)
- Rocking Johnny John Houghton – lead guitar, backing vocals (1979–1981)
- Colin Drummond – keyboards, violin (1986–1993)
- Dave Goldberg – keyboards (1993–2000, 2009–2011)
- Lou Rosenthal – drums (2000–2021)
- Chris Finley – keyboards (2011)
- Toni Baker – keyboards (2011)
- Alan Lovell – rhythm guitar, lead vocals (2011)

Early members

- David Elias – rhythm guitar, backing vocals (1961–1962)
- Frank Sloane – drums (1961–1962)

== Members of the Merseys (1966–1969) ==
- Tony Crane – lead vocals (1966–1969)
- Billy Kinsley – lead vocals (1966–1969)

with backing group the Fruit Eating Bears:

- Joey Molland – guitars
- Chris Finley – keyboards
- George Cassidy – bass
- Kenny Goodlass – drums
- Ken Mundye – drums

== The Merseybeats discography ==
=== Albums ===
Various artists: This Is Merseybeat Volume One

Oriole Records 1963
Includes one Merseybeats track, "Our Day Will Come"

The Merseybeats

Fontana Records June 1964

- "Milkman"
- "Hello Young Lovers"
- "He Will Break Your Heart"
- "Funny Face"
- "Really Mystified"
- "The Girl That I Marry"
- "Fools Like Me"
- "My Heart and I"
- "Bring It on Home to Me"
- "Lavender Blue"
- "Jumping Jonah"
- "Don't Turn Around"

UK Number 12

The Merseybeats

Fontana Records 1990
First CD release of the album with several of the group's non-album A- and B-sides added

I Think of You: The Complete Recordings

Bear Family Records 2002
Compiles the group's entire discography on one CD

Anniversary Tour 2003

Merseybeat Records 2003

The Merseybeats/The Merseys: I Stand Accused: The Complete Sixties Recordings

Cherry Red Records 2021
Double CD comprising the complete discographies of both the Merseybeats and the Merseys

=== EPs ===
I Think of You

Fontana Records March 1964

- "I Think Of You"
- "Mister Moonlight"
- "It's Love That Really Counts"
- "The Fortune Teller"

The Merseybeats on Stage

Fontana Records March 1964

- "Long Tall Sally"
- "I'm Gonna Sit Right Down And Cry"
- "Shame"
- "You Can't Judge A Book By Its Cover"

Wishin' and Hopin'

Fontana Records November 1964

- "Wishin' and Hopin'"
- "Hello, Young Lovers"
- "Milkman"
- "Jumping Jonah"

=== Singles ===
Year	Title	Peak chart positions	Record Label	B-side	Album
Year	Title	UK	Record Label	B-side	Album
1963	"It's Love That Really Counts"	24	Fontana Records	"The Fortune Teller"	
1963	"I Think of You"	5	Fontana Records	"Mister Moonlight"	
1964	"Don't Turn Around"	13	Fontana Records	"Really Mystified"	The Merseybeats
1964	"Wishin' and Hopin'"	13	Fontana Records	"Milkman"	
1964	"Last Night (I Made a Little Girl Cry)"	40	Fontana Records	"See Me Back"	
1965	"Don't Let It Happen to Us"	—	Fontana Records	"It Would Take a Long, Long Time"	
1965	"I Love You, Yes I Do"	22	Fontana Records	"Good, Good Lovin'"	
1965	"I Stand Accused"	38	Fontana Records	"All My Life"	

=== Videos ===
The Merseybeats in Concert

1999

== The Merseys discography ==
=== Albums ===
The Merseybeats/The Merseys: I Stand Accused: The Complete Sixties Recordings

Cherry Red Records 2021
Double CD comprising the complete discographies of both the Merseybeats and the Merseys

=== Singles ===
Year	Title	Peak chart positions	Record label	B-side
Year	Title	UK	Record label	B-side
1966	"Sorrow"	4	Fontana Records	"Some Other Day"
1966	"So Sad About Us"	—	Fontana Records	"Love Will Continue"
1966	"Rhythm of Love"	—	Fontana Records	"Is It Love"
1967	"The Cat"	—	Fontana Records	"Change of Heart"
1967	"Penny in My Pocket"	—	Fontana Records	"I Hope You're Happy"
1968	"Lovely Loretta"	—	Fontana Records	"Dreaming"
1968	"Honey Do" (as Crackers)	—	Fontana Records	"It Happens All the Time" (as Crackers)
