= Liverpool Express =

English pop rock band

- Also known as: L.E.X.
- Origin: Liverpool, England
- Genres: Rock, pop
- Years active: 1975–present
- Labels: Warner Bros. Records, Priority Records, Direct Records, Every Man Records
- Members: Billy Kinsley (bass, vocals); Kenny Parry (guitar, vocals); Dave Goldberg (keyboards, vocals); Adam Goldberg (drums)
- Past members: Roger Scott Craig (keyboards, vocals); Tony Coates (guitar, vocals); Derek Cashin (drums, vocals); Peter Phillips (keyboards, guitar, vocals); John Ryan (drums, vocals); Kenny Mundye (drums, vocals); Pete Kircher (drums, vocals); Brian Rawling (drums, vocals); Phil Chittick (drums, vocals); Ian Stirrat (keyboards, vocals, production)
- Website: liverpoolexpress.com

Liverpool Express (also known as L.E.X.) are a British pop rock band formed in 1975. They are best known for charting hit songs such as "You Are My Love" (which Paul McCartney once declared one of his favourite songs), "Every Man Must Have a Dream", "Hold Tight" and "Dreamin'".

== History ==
=== Formation ===
Musicians Billy Kinsley, Roger Scott Craig, Tony Coates, and Derek Cashin met during a game of football in Liverpool. They decided to form a band which was eventually named Liverpool Express. The song-writing partnership of Kinsley and Craig soon developed when they started getting together in a small rehearsal room at the Bluecoat Chambers in central Liverpool to write and arrange some of the band's early material. Drummer John Ryan joined in 1976.

=== Success ===
Before long the band recorded their first album, Tracks, produced by their manager, Hal Carter, who had managed many other successful musical acts, including Billy Fury, Eddie Cochran, Marty Wilde, Brenda Lee, and Johnny Burnette. Carter negotiated a recording deal for the band with Warner Bros. Records and within a matter of six months they had several hit records in the United Kingdom and Europe. The band's success continued when they were asked to support Rod Stewart on his tour of the UK and Europe in November to December 1976.

After their tour with Stewart, the band hit the recording studio to record their second album, Low Profile, in early 1977. They appeared on the major UK TV shows of that era (such as Top of the Pops, Supersonic, Multi-Coloured Swap Shop, and It's a Knockout), participated in a multitude of charity events, and played at major venues throughout the UK, Scandinavia, and Europe.

=== South American Tour ===
Their greatest success came in South America, where they scored two consecutive number one hits, and they toured Brazil in mid-1977. Arriving at Rio de Janeiro Airport, the band were greeted by thousands of hysterical fans. Billy Kinsley said: "It was quite a shock for us to be welcomed to Brazil by so many screaming fans. In fact, we thought someone famous was on our flight and we had no clue what was going on".

As soon as they arrived in Rio, the group were whisked away from the airplane in a fleet of limousines to a televised press conference. During their tour they filmed their own TV special for Rede Globo and made several TV appearances throughout the country.

Roger Scott Craig said: "The show (we did) in Belo Horizonte came to a complete standstill when I started to play our hit record, "You Are My Love", the crowd just went nuts to the point that our singer, Billy, could not even sing the song - he was overwhelmed by the crowd and the tears ran down his face."

=== Meeting Prince Charles ===
Following their successful tour of South America, Liverpool Express returned to the UK to perform some more shows and made further appearances on TV. They also filmed their own TV special for the BBC in Manchester.

According to the band's official website, in early 1978 Prince Charles specifically requested that Liverpool Express perform for him at the Royal Gala Performance to be held at the Empire Theatre in Liverpool. The band were introduced to the Prince and photographed with him after the show. Around this period, their second album, now titled Dreamin', found its release, but only in South America.

=== L.E.X. ===
During mid- to late 1978, the band decided to abbreviate their name to simply L.E.X. Drummer Pete Kircher joined the band to be the 'studio drummer', and participated in the recording of their third album, L.E.X., which was produced by Tommy Boyce and Richard Hartley. The album cover art featured the soon-to-be-famous model Jerry Hall, who later married Mick Jagger of The Rolling Stones. The group continued to tour and made appearances on the TV shows Get It Together, Star Games, and Multi-Coloured Swap Shop.

The following year, following the release of the new album, there were changes to the line-up. Drummer John Ryan continued playing on the live shows and his mate, guitarist Kenny Parry, replaced Tony Coates. In 1981, Roger Scott Craig emigrated to California. John Ryan joined 'The Swinging Blue Jeans' in 1980 and returned to Australia in 1983 to marry after meeting his future wife whilst on tour in 1981. Kinsley and Parry continued working together as Liverpool Express and enlisted Dave Goldberg on keyboards, Peter Phillips on keyboards and guitar (1985-1994) and Brian Rawling on drums. This line-up released two singles and a charity record during the 1980s. Kinsley, Goldberg and Parry have since remained the three core members of the band, playing with various stand-in drummers.

=== Reunion ===
The original line-up of the group were reunited in August 2002, following global fan interest. This led Craig to compile and release The Best of Liverpool Express, which featured a new song, a tribute to The Beatles titled "John George Ringo & Paul". A reunion concert in Liverpool shortly followed, with Craig appearing on stage with current band members Kinsley, Parry, and Dave Goldberg. A year later, Craig and Kinsley met in Liverpool to write and record new material for the album Once Upon a Time, which they self-produced.

The band occasionally plays live gigs in and around Liverpool. The current line-up comprises Billy Kinsley (bass guitar, vocals), Kenny Parry (guitar, vocals), Dave Goldberg (keyboards, vocals), and Dave's son, Adam Goldberg, on drums.

== Additional information ==
- Billy Kinsley played on the same bill as The Beatles many times at the Cavern Club in Liverpool during the early 1960s, whilst a member of The Merseybeats. He also worked with George Harrison and Paul McCartney at Apple Records in the late 1960s, whilst working as a session musician.
- TV presenter and singer Keith Chegwin was a friend of the band, having met them on Multi-Coloured Swap Shop and It's a Knockout. Chegwin, a singer in his own right, recorded a version of their song "I'll Never Fall in Love Again" on the Pye label in 1977. It was issued as a single and was a hit record in South America. Kinsley and Craig co-wrote and produced Chegwin's next single, "Destiny".
- During 1977, the band recorded with German musician Stefan Hallberg on his version of their song "So Here I Go Again". It was issued as a single on Warner Bros. Records in Germany. They also played on the single's B-side, "Der Fighter" (written by Hallberg).
- In 1979, the band released two singles and an album under the name "L.E.X".
- Billy Kinsley and Kenny Parry formed a side band with Brian Rawling called 'The Cheats', and they were popular on the pubs/clubs circuit in and around Merseyside during the 1980s.
- During the 1990s, Roger Scott Craig wrote music for films such as The Pelican Brief, Wyatt Earp, and Richie Rich as well as TV commercials.
- Earlier in Kenny Parrys musical career around Merseyside he was involved in the bands Colonel Bagshot, Hambone, Nickelodeon and Bunny. Of significance, he sang part of the original "Six Day War" hit by Colonel Bagshot, which has had global acclaim, and was on their Album " Oh What a Lovely War!"

== See also ==
- List of bands and artists from Merseyside
- List of performances on Top of the Pops
