= You can click, but you can't hide =

"Respect Copyrights" campaign

Rated "I" for "Illegal Downloading: Inappropriate for All Ages" campaign logo, based on the MPAA rating system.

"You can click, but you can't hide" is an advertising campaign run jointly by several international associations, most notably the Motion Picture Association of America (now the MPA) and the GVU, as part of the larger "Respect Copyrights" campaign against peer-to-peer file sharing of motion pictures. The associations have long alleged that Internet file sharing, or maintaining a file sharing tracker, network or search engine, constitutes copyright infringement since the practice hurts their revenues.

The phrase is an adaptation of the phrase "You can run but you can't hide", a statement attributed to American boxer Joe Louis. The "Illegal Downloading: Inappropriate for all ages" campaign logo is based on the MPAA Rating System logos.

In addition to a print and billboard campaign, BitTorrent tracker websites closed between October 2004 and May 2005 due to legal action by the associations have replaced their front page with the campaign's logo and an accompanying message:

There are websites that provide legal downloads. This is not one of them. This website has been permanently shut down by court order because it facilitates the illegal downloading of copyrighted motion pictures. The illegal downloading of motion pictures robs thousands of honest, hard-working people of their livelihood, and stifles creativity. Illegally downloading movies from sites such as these without proper authorization violates the law, is theft, and is not anonymous. Stealing movies leaves a trail. The only way not to get caught is to stop.

== LokiTorrent controversy ==
The associations have also obtained records from some closed tracker sites, which could be used to trace individual users. The administrator of one such site, LokiTorrent, closed the site and turned over its logs, amidst controversy, as part of a settlement ending a 2005 copyright infringement lawsuit filed by MPAA studios against him. The anti-piracy campaign's signature replaced the content of the website upon its shutting down.

== Comparison to other campaigns ==
The arresting nature of the graphics, and the use of scare tactics in this campaign is a marked difference from previous large-scale copyright-promotion campaigns such as Home Taping is Killing Music and Who Makes Movies?, which appealed to the consumer's interest in the art form and the consumer's compassion for movie industry workers. John G. Malcolm, former Senior Vice President and Director of Worldwide Anti-Piracy for the MPAA, has been quoted saying that the goal of the campaign is to "make an example of" internet movie thieves and other pirates. Former MPAA chief Dan Glickman insisted in a statement to film P2P traders that the MPAA "will find you, and you will be held responsible".

== See also ==
- Beware of illegal video cassettes
- Don't Copy That Floppy
- Home Recording Rights Coalition
- Home Taping Is Killing Music
- Knock-off Nigel
- Piracy is theft
- Public information film (PIF)
- Public service announcement
- Sony Corp. of America v. Universal City Studios, Inc.
- Spin (public relations)
- Steal This Film
- Warez
- Who Makes Movies?
- You Wouldn't Steal a Car
