= Piracy is theft =

Slogan against copyright infringement

A common explanation for why copyright infringement is not theft is that the original copyright holder still possesses the work they made, unlike the theft of an object.

"Piracy is theft" was a slogan used by UK non-profit organization FAST (Federation Against Software Theft). It was first used in the 1980s and has since then been used by other similar organisations such as MPAA (now the MPA). It has also been used as a statement, although that has been challenged as being inaccurate.

Copyright holders frequently refer to copyright infringement as theft, although such misuse has been rejected by legislatures and courts. In copyright law, infringement does not refer to theft of physical objects that take away the owner's possession, but an instance where a person exercises one of the exclusive rights of the copyright holder without authorization. Courts have distinguished between copyright infringement and theft. For instance, the United States Supreme Court held in Dowling v. United States (1985) that bootleg phonorecords did not constitute stolen property. Instead,

"interference with copyright does not easily equate with theft, conversion, or fraud. The Copyright Act even employs a separate term of art to define one who misappropriates a copyright: '[...] an infringer of the copyright.'"

The court said that in the case of copyright infringement, the province guaranteed to the copyright holder by copyright law – certain exclusive rights – is invaded, but no control, physical or otherwise, is taken over the copyright, nor is the copyright holder wholly deprived of using the copyrighted work or exercising the exclusive rights held.

The Software & Information Industry Association has claimed that "piracy is stealing," even in light of the legal difference between copyright infringement and theft.

== See also ==
- Beware of illegal video cassettes
- Don't Copy That Floppy
- Home Recording Rights Coalition
- Home Taping Is Killing Music
- Knock-off Nigel
- Property is theft!
- Public information film (PIF)
- Public service announcement
- Sony Corp. of America v. Universal City Studios, Inc.
- Spin (public relations)
- Steal This Film
- The Pirate Bay
- Who Makes Movies?
- You can click, but you can't hide
- You Wouldn't Steal a Car
