= When the going gets tough, the tough get going (disambiguation) =

When the going gets tough, the tough get going is a popular witticism in American English.

When the Going Gets Tough, the Tough Get Going may also refer to:

- When the Going Gets Tough, the Tough Get Going (song), a song by Billy Ocean
- When the Going Gets Tough, the Tough Get Going (album), an album by Bow Wow Wow

== See also ==
- When the Going Gets Tough (disambiguation)
