= Federation Against Copyright Theft =

Trade association in the UK

- Abbreviation: FACT
- Formation: 1983; 43 years ago
- Website: www.fact-uk.org.uk

The Federation Against Copyright Theft (FACT) is a British organisation established in 1983 to protect and represent the interests of its members' intellectual property (IP). FACT also investigates fraud and cybercrime, and provides global due diligence services to support citizenship investment and trade, business, financial and legal compliance.

FACT investigates and takes action against illegal content providers, and provides information about the risks of engaging with piracy and illegal content. FACT's partnership with Crimestoppers UK allows for the reporting of crime and illegal activity anonymously.

== Members ==
FACT protects the intellectual property rights of global organisations including Premier League, TNT Sports, Virgin Media and Sky.

== Court cases ==
=== Surfthechannel.com ===
In June 2009, FACT brought criminal prosecution against the company Scopelight and its founder, Anton Vickerman, for running a pirate video search engine called Surfthechannel.com, which had a substantial user base and was a highly profitable illegal business. FACT commenced a private criminal prosecution, which required access to all the evidence in the custody of the police. Action taken by Scopelight's owners to prevent the evidence being given to FACT was rejected at the Court of Appeal (Scopelight & Ors v Chief Constable of Northumbria Police & Federation Against Copyright Theft [2009] EWCA Civ 1156) where the Court judgment made clear the legality of providing evidence to support a private prosecution.

Vickerman was charged with two counts of Conspiracy to Defraud and a criminal trial took place at Newcastle Crown Court in June and July 2012 in front of His Honour Judge Evans.

After a seven-week trial, the jury found Anton Vickerman guilty and he was sentenced to four years' imprisonment on each charge of Conspiracy to Defraud, sentencing to run concurrently.

Subsequently, Vickerman was ordered to pay £73,055.79 within six months or face a further prison sentence under proceeds of crime legislation.

=== freelivefooty ===
FACT conducted an investigation into the freelivefooty site and supplied evidence to Thames Valley Police who arrested the principal Gary. The site illegally streamed Premier League matches and charged viewers a price that undercut the official broadcaster, Sky. Gary used a satellite dish, seven computers and nine satellite decoders to run the freelivefooty website from his home.

He was prosecuted by the Crown Prosecution Service in 2013 and, on conviction, he received a six-month prison sentence suspended for two years and was ordered to carry out 200 hours of unpaid work. He was found guilty of one count of communicating a copyrighted work to the public in the course of a business contrary to Section 107 of the Copyright, Designs and Patents Act 1988. An accomplice, Bannister, was ordered to carry out 140 hours of unpaid work after he was found guilty of transferring criminal property contrary to Section 327(1)(d) of the Proceeds of Crime Act 2002.

FACT described this case as "groundbreaking, proving conclusively that operating a website that rebroadcasts copyrighted works without permission is a criminal offence".

=== NZBsRus ===
In June 2013, FACT pressured the Usenet file indexing site called NZBsRus to close after issuing cease-and-desist letters to the owner and several staff members.

=== TheCod3r ===
In May 2013, Philip Danks attended the Showcase cinema in Walsall and used a camcorder to record Fast & Furious 6 on the day of its release. Danks uploaded this copy online and the film was subsequently downloaded more than 700,000 times, causing significant revenue loss to Universal Pictures. FACT identified Danks by linking him to the online name of the uploader, which was TheCod3r. Five days after the recording was made Danks was arrested by West Midlands Police. Wolverhampton Crown Court heard that despite his arrest Danks continued to copy, sell and distribute illegal copies of films. He also enlisted the help of his sister's ex-boyfriend, Michael Bell, who uploaded films on his behalf.

Both men pleaded guilty to charges of committing offences under the Fraud Act 2006 and the Copyright, Designs and Patents Act 1988. Danks was sentenced to 33 months' imprisonment. Bell received a 12-month Community Order with 120 hours of unpaid work.

=== Paul Mahoney ===
In 2014, FACT and the Police Service of Northern Ireland led an investigation into Paul Mahoney who ran a website from his bedroom which enabled visitors to find streaming links to films hosted on third party websites. Mahoney generated money by charging for advertising on his website. Mahoney pleaded guilty to two charges of conspiracy to defraud, one of acquiring criminal property and one of converting criminal property. He was sentenced to four years' imprisonment.

=== Release groups ===
In 2015, FACT undertook an investigation that led to the first prosecution of a 'release group'. Five suspects distributed illegally recorded copies of films online while they were still being shown in cinemas.

The five, who went under several online aliases including 'memory100', 'Cheese', 'Reidy', 'Cooperman' and 'Kareemzos', all pleaded guilty to conspiracy to defraud and were sentenced to a total of 17 years' imprisonment.

=== First sentencing in IPTV boxes case in England ===
In 2016, a FACT-supported investigation led to the first criminal case involving a supplier of illegal IPTV boxes enabling viewers to watch unauthorised content. Terry O'Reilly and Will O'Leary were selling devices to pubs and consumers which facilitated mass piracy, including the broadcasting of Premier League football on unauthorised channels.

Both defendants were convicted of conspiracy to defraud. O'Reilly was sentenced to four years' imprisonment. O'Leary received a two-year suspended sentence.

=== Fake DVD sellers jailed ===
Following an investigation by Suffolk Police and FACT in 2017, three men were jailed for a total of 10 years and seven months. Frankie Ansell, his cousin Lee Ansell, Howard Davey and Joseph Plant managed a sophisticated counterfeit DVD business over a two-and-a-half-year period, selling over 31,000 DVDs worth more than £500,000.

Frankie Ansell was sentenced to 45 months' imprisonment, Lee Ansell and Davey were both sentenced to 41 months' imprisonment. Plant received a 16-month sentence suspended for two years and was ordered to complete 200 hours of unpaid work.

=== Evolution Trading ===
A married couple illegally made £750,000 by selling more than 8,000 illicit streaming devices and running a service that provided illegal access to Premier League football. In 2018, following a FACT-assisted case the owner of the company Evolution Trading, Jon Haggerty, pleaded guilty to conspiracy to defraud and dishonestly obtaining services for another. Haggerty was sentenced to five years and three months' imprisonment. His wife, Mary Gilfillan, was convicted of fraud offences and given a two-year suspended sentence.

=== Dreambox ===
Three men provided illegal access to Premier League football to more than 1,000 pubs, clubs and homes throughout England and Wales and used a range of technologies to commit fraud over the course of a decade. Trading under the names Dreambox (unincorporated), Dreambox TV Limited and Digital Switchover Limited, the fraudulent companies earned in excess of £5 million through illegal activity.

Following a FACT-assisted Premier League investigation, this case saw some of the longest sentences ever issued for piracy-related crimes. In 2019, Steven King, who masterminded the fraud, was sentenced to seven years and four months' imprisonment. Paul Rolston was sentenced to six years and four months’ imprisonment and Daniel Malone was sentenced to three years and three months' imprisonment.

=== Bovingdon Market ===
As part of ongoing investigations at Bovingdon Market by Hertfordshire Trading Standards in 2020, supported by FACT, two men were found guilty of encouraging consumers to obtain services dishonestly, contrary to the Serious Crime Act 2007 and the Fraud Act 2006. The jury also found Thomas Tewelde and Mohamed Abdou guilty of failing in their duty of care to ensure that the boxes were electrically safe.

Tewelde and Abdou were each sentenced to 12 months' imprisonment suspended for two years and were ordered to pay £1,000 in costs and complete 120 hours of unpaid work.

=== Former police officer jailed ===
Daniel Aimson was a police officer previously jailed in 2017 for bulk sale cannabis production. A joint operation between Greater Manchester Police and FACT found that a company managed by Aimson sold IPTV devices between September 2016 and May 2017 that allowed customers to bypass paywalls and access subscription sport and film channels for free.

In 2020, Aimson admitted conspiracy to commit fraud and was sentenced to twelve months' imprisonment.

=== Software developer jailed ===
In 2021, in the first conviction of its type in the UK, a man who created and built a software package which enabled illegal access to BT Sport, Sky, Netflix and other subscription television content via apps and add-ons for the Kodi media player was sentenced to two and a half years’ imprisonment. Supported by BT Sport and Greater Manchester Police, FACT brought a private prosecution against Stephen Millington, who pleaded guilty to multiple fraud and copyright offences, including making and supplying software to enable illegal access to subscription content, distributing infringing film content via a dedicated server he controlled, sharing login credentials for subscription streaming services and illegally accessing content for his own use.

== Anti-piracy warnings ==
The 1995–1998 Columbia-Tristar version of "Beware of Illegal Video Cassettes"

Pirate Videos: Daylight Robbery

FACT has produced several adverts, warnings & PIFS which have all appeared at the beginning (and sometimes, the end) of videos and DVDs released in the UK, as well as trailers shown before films in cinemas.

=== 1980s ===
Shortly after the founding of the company, FACT (along with sponsorship from Fuji Video Cassettes and Rank Film Laboratories) made a PIF discussing about video piracy and the causes of it. The PIF itself would show pictures of pirated tapes, posters for films released at the time including, E.T. the Extra-Terrestrial, Octopussy, Return of the Jedi and Gandhi, as well as pictures of filmmaking and a cinema disappearing through a transition effect to symbolise the death of the film industry. It then discusses the consequences of video piracy publicly released by parliament; two years in prison and unlimited fines, along with a picture of a bargain of legal video tapes disappearing through another transition effect. The PIF ends with the same FACT logo shown at the beginning along with a phone number used at the time. This PIF would be shown in cinemas at the time as well as appearing at the end of various Palace Video rental releases.

=== 1990s ===
During the 1990s and early 2000s, FACT created a 30-second to one-minute anti-piracy warning called "Beware of Illegal Video Cassettes", reminding customers to check whether or not they have a genuine VHS cassette, and how to report pirated copies; warning that poor quality illegal cassettes could detract from their viewing experience, jeopardise the production of future films, and even damage their VHS recorder. They would appear on many different video cassettes by various home video distributors (mostly major film studios). Versions for each film studio depicting their respective security label (generally either a hologram of the film studio's logo, or, in Disney's case, a film's title) were created, with several iterations for each as the FACT hotline number changed multiple times throughout the decade with the message "Video Piracy Is a Crime, Do Not Accept It". The warning would be shown at the start of most rental VHS tapes in the UK (as well as many retail tapes), similar to the FBI Warning found on tapes in the United States. CIC Video and The Walt Disney Company had a similar term, with the hologram carrying copies of CIC's logo in the case of the former, and the hologram carrying an image of Mickey Mouse from the Walt Disney Home Video logo in the case of the latter. Gradually, the major film studios began adopting their own anti-piracy messages (with Columbia-TriStar Home Entertainment being the only studio to retain the "Beware of Illegal Video Cassettes" warning, though it would be eventually retired in 2005)

From late 1996, this warning would sometimes be followed by a public information film featuring a man attempting to return a pirate video purchased from a street market after discovering that the sound was garbled and the picture unwatchable, ending with the tagline "Pirate Videos: Daylight Robbery”. This advert was used until 2002. A precursor PIF, "Video Piracy: It's Not Worth It!" was released in 1995 and featured a young girl named Rebecca trying to watch a pirated VHS tape, ending with a VCR falling down with the words on top: "VIDEO PIRACY. It's not worth it”.

=== 2000s ===
In 2002, FACT released a PIF called "The Pirates are Out to Get You". It featured a man destroying VHSs and CDs, amongst other items, with an X-shaped branding iron, ending with both the FACT logo and the UK & Ireland (or in the case of Universal Pictures (UK) Ltd, Australia & New Zealand as well) hotlines. The warning would be placed at the beginning (or in the case of Universal Pictures (UK) Ltd, the end) of rental (and most retail) VHS tapes and some DVDs in the UK, similar to the FBI Warning found on tapes in the United States.

With the advent of DVD, FACT borrowed the Motion Picture Association's anti-piracy spot "You Wouldn't Steal a Car", which concentrated more on copyright infringement through peer-to-peer file sharing and less on counterfeit copies. The spot related the peer-to-peer file sharing of movies to stealing a handbag, a car, and other such items (similar to the US FAST "Piracy is theft" slogan of the 1990s). It has been suggested that these adverts used a copyrighted font without permission. However, there is no evidence to suggest that the campaign's designers were aware that the font was pirated.

More recent spots have included Knock-off Nigel, devised by the Industry Trust for Intellectual Property Awareness, where a man is ridiculed by his friends and colleagues for buying counterfeit DVDs and downloading films from BitTorrent, along with ads that say "Thank You" to the British public for supporting the film industry by either buying a ticket and seeing a film in the cinema or purchasing a genuine DVD or Blu-ray.

== See also ==
- Conspiracy to defraud
- Copyfraud
- Copyleft
- Copyright
- Copyright alternatives
- Criticism of copyright
- Don't Copy That Floppy
- Fraud
- Home Recording Rights Coalition
- Home Taping Is Killing Music
- Internet freedom
- Knock-off Nigel
- Piracy is theft
- Public information film (PIF)
- Public service announcement
- Spin (public relations)
- Steal This Film
- Who Makes Movies?
- You can click, but you can't hide
- You Wouldn't Steal a Car
