= TimeTrax =

TimeTrax is a software and hardware platform from Time Trax Technologies Corp. which allows audio recording from satellite radio, Internet streaming and traditional radio broadcasts.

The original software was created by Scott MacLean to time shift XM Satellite Radio programming using the $50 XM PCR PC-connected satellite radio—doing so by recording the audio to MP3 format, and saving songs as individual MP3 files, named and tagged with the artist and song name. Now, the TimeTrax technology "de-aggregates" any radio-like broadcast and then reassembles that content, customized for the user. In other words, it records individual songs from the radio, saves each song as individual MP3 files and allows the user to build a music library.

Although XM initially encouraged third-party application development for the XM PCR radio, publishing links to third-party applications on its website, XM discontinued the XM PCR radio after the release of TimeTrax. XM publicly stated that the discontinuation of the XM PCR was a previously planned product end-of-life, however several sources from within XM later confirmed that the withdrawal of the product was due to mounting pressure from the RIAA due to the emergence of TimeTrax. After the withdrawal of the XM PCR and because of the popularity of TimeTrax, used XM PCR radios started selling online for as much as $300.

== Acquisition by Time Trax ==
Acquired by Time Trax Technologies Corporation (a Delaware Corporation) in September 2004, the company expanded the product offering to include hardware that functioned with the XM Direct radio, as well as the Sirius Connect radio. They also included functionality to operate with the XM Online streaming audio system. The company registered numerous patents, although there has been much debate about the validity of the patent of their system, due to its simplicity. At the 2006 CES (Consumer Electronics Show), Time Trax announced and demonstrated a new product, TraxCatcher. Traxcatcher resembled a 'clock radio' and had a dock and portable MP3 player. It functioned much like the satellite radio product, but for use with FM radio and had a 'line in'. This demonstrated more depth to the company's claims about their technology because FM radio does not provide the data stream with song name and artist (which provides the timing for 'cuts'). According to the media that got to use the product, it seemed to function as the company claimed (today, despite a commitment from the company, it appears that the product has not been made available for sale).

While receiving press and media attention for the consumer software and hardware products, the company also developed an OEM business as well as an international partnership which included the sharing of technologies with a company in Sweden called PopCatcher.

After stories featuring MacLean and TimeTrax appeared in the New York Times, USA Today, and in syndicated AP articles, TimeTrax became the de facto standard in time shifting of satellite radio. Time Trax's Elliott Frutkin was a very visible critic of the entertainment industry and provoked the RIAA with press release titles such as "Will Time Trax Product Launch Rattle the RIAA, Again?" Time Trax was also involved in the Grokster Supreme Court case, insofar as they filed an 'amicus curiae' brief.

== 2006 events ==
By July 7, 2006, the address of the TimeTrax home page was redirecting to the XM Radio corporate site. This created significant confusion and speculation that TimeTrax may have either been acquired by XM Radio or forced to shut down. At the same time, an alleged representative from Time Trax asked SatelliteGuys.US to shut down a forum they hosted for the company. After questioning the authenticity of the contact, the forum was restored a short time later to provide information to Time Trax customers as well as wait for an official confirmation from Time Trax. On July 15, 2006, SatelliteGuys.US posted details from an interview with Time Trax's Elliott Frutkin. Although he was unable to speak on details of the issue, he confirmed that TimeTrax was no longer on the consumer market, although there were no current plans to disable the technology infrastructure to allow continued use by individual consumers. Mr. Frutkin hinted at several possibilities the company was considering for their software, some of which included turning the registration servers over to a third party, releasing a patch that would stop TimeTrax from looking for the server, or distribute the software as either freeware or open source.

Since then, the TimeTrax website has been restored to its original operation, and hosts previous versions of the TimeTrax software. No further information has been made available regarding the viability of the company, and there has been no confirmation whether they are still in operation. On November 1, 2006, SatelliteGuys.US closed their Time Trax forum due to a lack of current information about the company.

== Current status (2017) ==
The TimeTrax software was made available for download until 2008 along with a hardware adapter for downloading and MP3 creation purposes. The servers upon which the TimeTrax software relied were shut down in 2013, at which point all operations ceased.
