= Home Taping Is Killing Music =

Anti-copyright infringement slogan

The original logo

"Home Taping Is Killing Music" was the slogan of a 1980s anti-copyright infringement propaganda campaign by the British Phonographic Industry (BPI), a British music industry trade group. With the rise in cassette recorder popularity, the BPI feared that the ability of private citizens to record music from the radio onto cassettes would cause a decline in record sales. The logo, consisting of a Jolly Roger formed from the silhouette of a compact cassette, also included the words "And It's Illegal". The campaign was officially launched by then-BPI chairman Chris Wright on 28 October 1981.

An early proponent of home taping was Malcolm McLaren, who was at the time managing the British new wave band Bow Wow Wow. In 1980, the band released their cassette single "C·30 C·60 C·90 Go" on cassette that featured a blank B-side on which the buyer could record their own music.

In the 2000s, the campaign experienced a revival, as the Norwegian branch of IFPI (International Federation of the Phonographic Industry) launched a new campaign named Piracy Kills Music. The campaign has exactly the same message, same name and similar logos. The campaign won the Norwegian 2008 Gulltaggen award for "Best Internet Strategy" with much controversy.

== Parodies ==
Example of a parody of the original logo

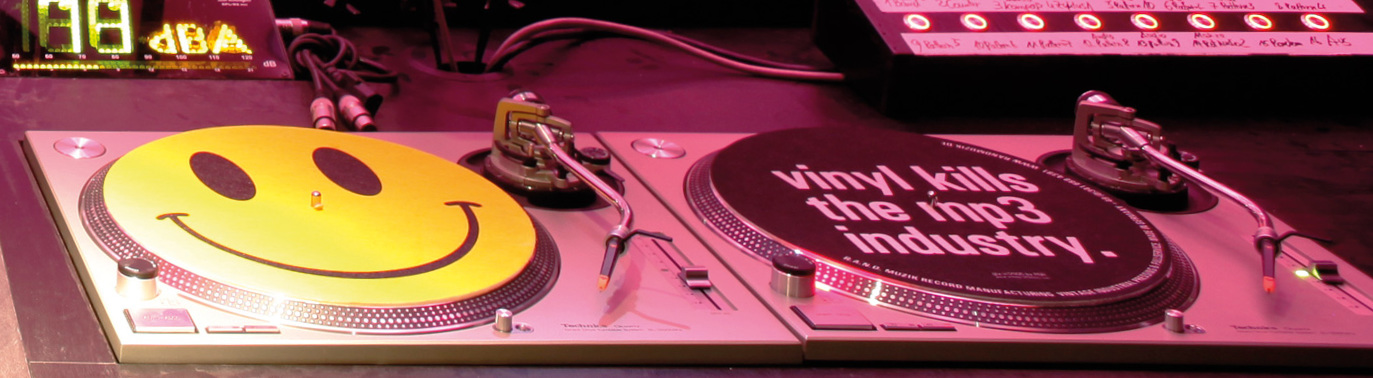
Section of a DJ set in a nightclub with a slipmat having the imprint Vinyl kills the mp3 industry. (2014)

The slogan was often parodied, one example being the addendum and it's about time too!, used by Dutch anarcho-punk band the Ex. Some fanzines changed the words from Home taping is killing the music industry and added the words ...so be sure to do your part! below the logo. Another example was the early 1980s counter-slogan Home Taping is Skill in Music, referring to early mixtapes, a precursor to sampling and remixes. The cassette & crossbones image was displayed briefly as a backdrop in the "Time Out for Fun" video by the band Devo from their 1982 album, Oh, No! It's Devo. Venom's 1982 album Black Metal used the logo with the words Home Taping Is Killing Music; So Are Venom. The phrase Home-Taping Is Making Music appears on the back cover of Peter Principle's self-produced 1988 album Tone Poems. The American punk band Rocket from the Crypt sold T-shirts with the tape and bones and the words "Home Taping Is Killing the Music Industry: Killing Ain't Wrong." Sonic Youth has T-shirts with the cassette and "Sonic Youth" written under it. The cover of Billy Bragg's album Workers Playtime featured a notice reading "Capitalism is killing music – pay no more than £4.99 for this record". Mitch Benn also comments "Home taping isn't killing music, music's dying of natural causes" in the song "Steal This Song" on the album Radioface. In Poland during the mid-1980s, some (PRONIT label) vinyl pressings of certain albums contained a parody stamp labeled "Home taping... is much fun".

One cassette version of the Dead Kennedys EP In God We Trust Inc. had a blank side, printed with the message "Home taping is killing record industry profits! We left this side blank so you can help."

During the 1980s, rock group the Beat sold blank cassette tapes as merchandise at their live shows. The band frequently encouraged fans and concert patrons to record their live performances instead of illegally copying their studio albums. The group's leader, Paul Collins, believed this practice would satisfy a need for instant gratification while preventing the sales of their albums from diminishing.

La Route du Rock biannual music festival in France uses the tape image as part of the event's logo.

The Pirate Bay logo with cassette and crossbones

Later, the pro-p2p file sharing group Downhill Battle has used the slogan "Home Taping Is Killing the Music Industry, and It's Fun" on T-shirts, and the BitTorrent website The Pirate Bay uses the logo of a pirate ship whose sails bear the "tape and bones." Additionally the Pirate Party UK has a version of the tape and bones with the logo "copyright is killing music – and it's legal" and the Swedish Piratbyrån is using the same tape and bones as their logo.

Similar rhetoric has continued; in 1982 Jack Valenti famously compared the VCR and its anticipated effect on the movie industry to the Boston Strangler, and in 2005 Mitch Bainwol of the RIAA claimed that CD burning is hurting music sales.

In March 2010, TalkTalk, as part of its campaign against the UK Government's filesharing proposals, created a spoof video entitled "Home Taping is Killing Music". The song was written and performed by singer/songwriter Dan Bull and featured lookalikes of Madonna, George Michael and Adam Ant lip-synching to the song.

== See also ==
- Beware of illegal video cassettes
- Criticism of copyright
- Don't Copy That Floppy
- Home Recording Rights Coalition
- Internet freedom
- Knock-off Nigel
- Old-time radio § Home radio recordings in the United States
- Piracy is theft
- Public information film (PIF)
- Public service announcement
- Radio ripping
- Sony Corp. of America v. Universal City Studios, Inc.
- Spin (public relations)
- Steal This Film
- The Pirate Bay
- Who Makes Movies?
- You can click, but you can't hide
- You Wouldn't Steal a Car
