= When the Going Gets Tough =

When the Going Gets Tough may refer to:

- When the going gets tough, the tough get going, a popular English language proverb
- "When the Going Gets Tough, the Tough Get Going" (song), a 1985 song by Billy Ocean
- When the Going Gets Tough, the Tough Get Going (album), a 1983 album by Bow Wow Wow
- "When the Going Gets Tough" (Raven song), a 1985 song by Raven from Stay Hard
- When the Going Gets Tough (novel), a novel by Mel White

== See also ==
- When the going gets tough, the tough get going (disambiguation)
