= Don't Copy That Floppy =

Software anti-piracy campaign

The "Disk Protector" showing the title of the campaign during the rap portion of the video

Don't Copy That Floppy was an anti-copyright infringement campaign run by the Software Publishers Association (SPA) beginning in 1992.

The video for the campaign, starring M. E. Hart as "MC Double Def DP", was filmed at Cardozo High School in Washington, D.C., and produced by cooperation between the SPA, the Educational Section Anti-Piracy Committee, and the Copyright Protection Fund, in association with Vilardi Films.

The groups distributed the film for general viewing through VHS tapes that were mailed to schools. In later years, the film became a viral video sensation through websites such as YouTube, where the official video has had over 2 million views as of January 2022.

On August 17, 2009, the Software and Information Industry Association (formed in 1999 when the Software Publishers Association merged with the Information Industry Association) released a follow-up to Don't Copy That Floppy called Don't Copy That 2.

== Background ==
The Software Publishers Association has long opposed software piracy. In 1986 it canceled a planned award to Central Point Software for selling 100,000 copies of a program, after discovering that the product was a disk copier.

== Synopsis ==
Screenshot from ad showing Corey and Jenny playing a video game

Two teenagers, Jenny (played by Marja Allen) and Corey (played by Jimmy Todd), are playing a game on a classroom computer. Corey is exuberantly pushing keys to show the viewer that he is heavily immersed in the game action; Jenny is winning. Frustrated, he asks for a rematch, but she has an upcoming class and must leave. He decides he will copy the game so that he can play it at home. Upon inserting his blank floppy disk into the Apple Macintosh LC, a video pops up on the computer. This video is of a rapper named MC Double Def DP, the "Disk Protector" (played by M.E. Hart).

The message of the video is that copyright infringement of software will cause the video game industry to lose money, resulting in fewer computer games. At the end of the video, the DP fades away, leaving Corey and Jenny to decide for themselves whether they will copy the game — they decide against it. Corey, who has some money left over from his summer job, decides that he will buy the game. Jenny agrees and jokes that Corey's game will even come with a manual. The Wall Street Journal has stated that the film's aesthetic is similar to the television program Saved by the Bell. It has also highlighted it as an example of classic bubblegum hip-hop with significant staying power.

== Criticism ==
Educators and the press criticized the campaign for only promoting a single point of view that benefited the software publishing industry, and failed to present a broader scope of the issue of copyright infringement and alternative views such as the free software movement.

== Popularity online ==
In the mid-2000s, the video's popularity was revived, becoming a meme. Since the creators have always allowed noncommercial copying of the film, it became a viral video after video-sharing sites such as Google Video and YouTube went online in the mid-2000s. The video first gained popularity on the site YTMND in 2004 and then gained (and regained) widespread YouTube popularity in 2005, 2006, and 2008, sparking user-generated remixes and parodies, and is now considered a popular internet meme.

A sample from the advertisement was used in the song "Taking What's Not Yours" by the band TV Girl.

== Sequel ==
In August 2009, the Software and Information Industry Association (SIIA) released a follow-up to the original video of 1992, titled Don't Copy That 2. The video features M. E. Hart reprising his role as "MC Double Def DP" and follows a college student named Jason who sells pirated software online before being arrested for his crimes (though it is unclear whether the legal repercussions are a dream or not). The video also features convicted software pirate Jeremiah Mondello in a prison interview.

=== Criticism ===
Since its release, Don't Copy That 2 has been criticized by the press for being out of date, referencing material like the Doom series and Klingon that the current target audience (mostly teenagers) may not be familiar with. The sequel was also heavily criticized in the press for misrepresenting the way copyright law is enforced, what types of copying were actually considered "criminal" enough to prompt punishment, and what punishment actually looked like.

== See also ==
- Beware of illegal video cassettes
- Criticism of copyright
- Copyfraud
- Copyleft
- Copyright alternatives
- Criticism of intellectual property
- Home Recording Rights Coalition
- Home Taping Is Killing Music
- Internet freedom
- Knock-off Nigel
- Piracy is theft
- Public information film (PIF)
- Public service announcement
- Sony Corp. of America v. Universal City Studios, Inc.
- Spin (public relations)
- Steal This Film
- Who Makes Movies?
- You can click, but you can't hide
- You Wouldn't Steal a Car
