= Who Makes Movies? =

Advertising campaign

Who Makes Movies? was an advertising campaign run jointly by several international associations looking to crack down on copyright infringement of motion pictures, most notably the MPAA (now the MPA), as part of the larger "Respect Copyrights" campaign. The campaign was endorsed by several motion picture workers' guilds, including the Directors Guild of America, the International Alliance of Theatrical Stage Employees, Moving Picture Technicians, Artists and Allied Crafts, the Motion Picture Editors Guild, the Screen Actors Guild and the Writers Guild of America.

== Installments ==
Five short films were created, each profiling the work done by primarily blue-collar workers in the production of a feature film. These films were shown as movie trailers in large movie theaters, and were also made available on the website respectcopyrights.org.

The films profile:

- A set painter
- A director animator
- A grip
- A make-up artist
- A stuntman

In addition to explaining their jobs, the worker gives details about their life to the viewer. For example, the set painter declares "I met my wife when I did The Big Chill." The worker then appeals to the viewer to not download movies as it reduces the income of ordinary, common workers. It is an attempt to dispel the concept that copyright infringement only reduces the profits of large, faceless movie studios and rich movie stars. One problem raised with the spots is that blue collar workers highlighted are typically paid hourly or daily and do not share in movie profit participation.

== Comparison to other campaigns ==
The campaign attempts to appeal to a consumer's compassion, much in the same way that the Home Taping is Killing Music campaign appealed to the consumer's interest in the art form.

== Parody and criticism ==
Some critics found the tone of the ads to be disingenuous, and "holier-than-thou". Some also pointed out that advertising as a movie trailer was targeting the people who were already paying to see movies, and added to the growing inconveniences associated with attending movies in person.

The ads inspired many parodies, including:

- A short film, also named "Who Makes Movies?", providing a fictional sixth installment from the perspective of a fluffer in the adult film industry. The film was written and directed by Chris Luccy and stars Tom Konkle as "Handy" Randy Palmer. The film is accompanied by the parody website "Respect-Porno.org".
- A widely distributed internet video called "Who Steals Movies?", from the perspective of a common movie bootlegger who will be out of money if the MPAA's campaign is successful.
- The November 11, 2006 The Boondocks strip portrays the story of Rufus "Spielberg" Jenkins, who decries the effects of internet piracy on his theater-taping bootlegging business.
- One year later, the television adaptation of The Boondocks criticized Who Makes Movies by comparing stealing a seat in a theater to robbing & violently murdering an old woman in the episode "...Or Die Trying".

== See also ==
- Beware of illegal video cassettes
- Criticism of copyright
- Internet freedom
- Don't Copy That Floppy
- Home Recording Rights Coalition
- Home Taping Is Killing Music
- Knock-off Nigel
- Piracy is theft
- Public information film (PIF)
- Public service announcement
- Sony Corp. of America v. Universal City Studios, Inc.
- Spin (public relations)
- Steal This Film
- You can click, but you can't hide
- You Wouldn't Steal a Car
