= Knock-off Nigel =

UK television campaign

Knock-off Nigel was a 2007 television campaign against copyright infringement in the United Kingdom.

The campaign included a series of television advertisements in which the eponymous Nigel was described as having bought unlicenced DVDs, illegally downloaded films, and so on, to the accompaniment of a derisive song: "He's a knock-off Nigel..." As a result of his wrongdoings, Nigel was left lonely and despised by his peers.

== See also ==
- Beware of illegal video cassettes
- Don't Copy That Floppy
- Home Recording Rights Coalition
- Home Taping Is Killing Music
- Piracy is theft
- Public information film (PIF)
- Public service announcement
- Spin (public relations)
- Steal This Film
- Who Makes Movies?
- You can click, but you can't hide
- You Wouldn't Steal a Car
