= You Wouldn't Steal a Car =

Anti-piracy campaign

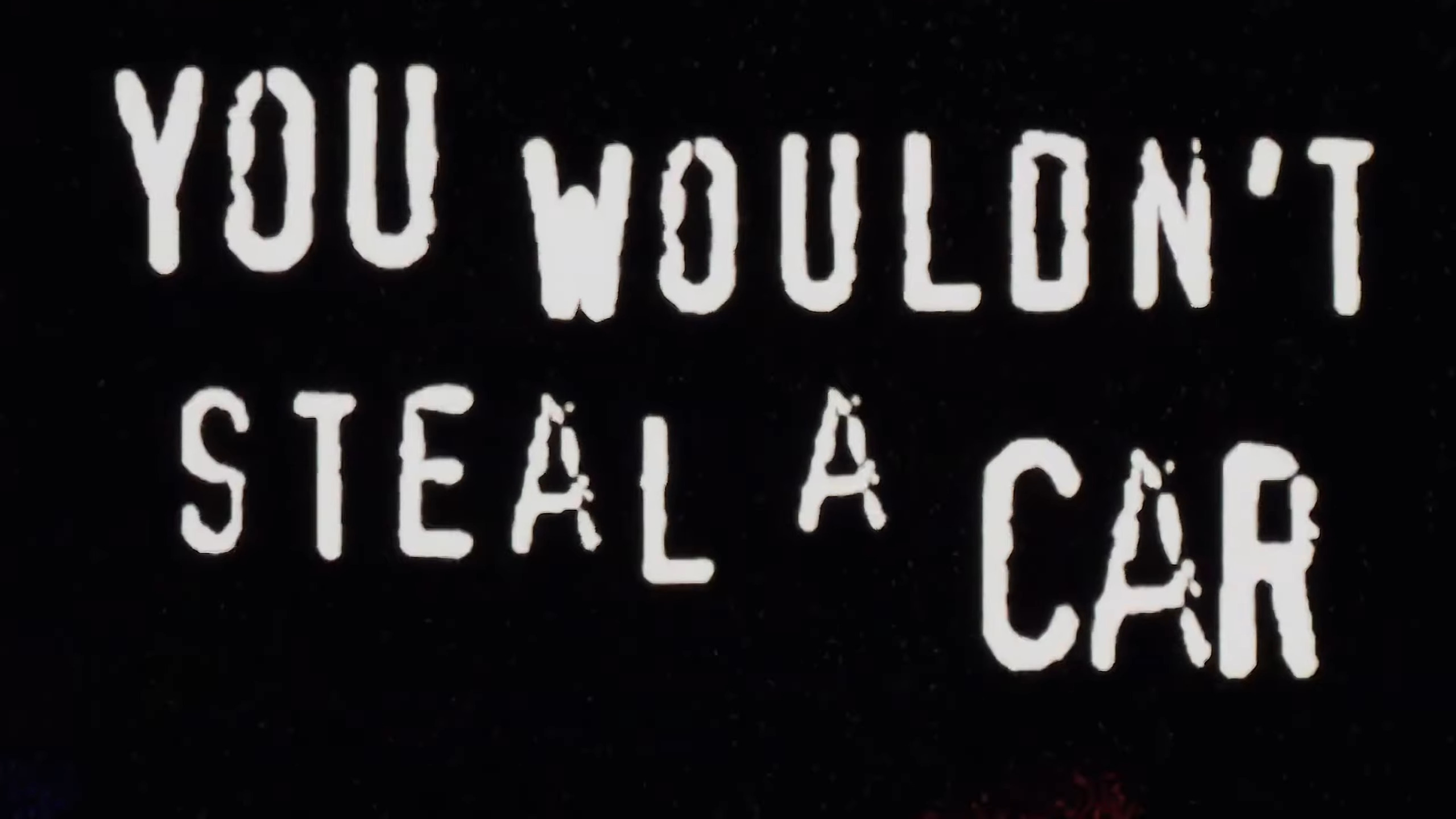
- "You Wouldn't Steal a Car" as shown in the campaign
- Directed by: Ricky Mintz
- Written by: Ricky Mintz; Joe Nelms
- Produced by: Ricky Mintz
- Edited by: Terry Paul; Daryl Clift
- Production company: The Idea Place (Warner Bros.)
- Release date: June 8, 2004
- Country: United States
- Language: English

"You Wouldn't Steal a Car" (also known as "Piracy. It's a Crime.") is the de facto title of a series of public service announcement trailers produced by Warner Bros. and marketed by the Motion Picture Association of America. (Note: The PSA title is derived from the first statement displayed in the trailers.) Published on June 8, 2004, it was launched as an international campaign to combat the rapid emergence of pirating copyrighted movies, especially with regard to the increasing prevalence of internet access at home in the early 2000s. Having been widely disseminated through cinema screenings and an unskippable segment on many commercial DVDs sold between 2004 and the late 2000s, it spawned a range of memes and parodies.

== Background ==
The trailers were a joint effort between the Motion Picture Association of America (now the MPA), seven major film studios, and the National Association of Theatre Owners (now Cinema United). It debuted in theaters on June 8, 2004, and on home media on July 27. It appeared in theaters internationally from 2004 until 2008.

The trailer was directed, filmed, and edited by the Idea Place, a Warner Bros. in-house advertising agency, but the messaging was collectively agreed on by all participating film studios and the MPA. Filming took place on the Paramount Pictures studio lot.

== Synopsis ==
Two trailers were published. The first, titled Downloader, begins by depicting a teenage girl in her bedroom starting to download a film on a piracy website, while the second, titled Street Vendor, depicts two women walking past a street vendor selling counterfeit goods, where they stop to browse pirated DVDs. In both versions, various examples of stealing are then demonstrated, including breaking into a car, taking a handbag and shoplifting a DVD. Downloader mentions that downloading pirated movies is also stealing, while Street Vendor mentions that purchasing pirated movies is also stealing. The girl ultimately cancels the download and the couple choose not to purchase any of the pirated DVDs.

== Public reception ==
According to the Canadian Internet Policy and Public Interest Clinic, the announcement was unsuccessful and was largely a source of ridicule. Likewise, a 2022 behavioral economics paper published in The Information Society found the PSAs may, in fact, have increased piracy rates. By 2009, over 100 parodies of the announcement had been created.

== Copyright concerns ==
It was reported that the music in the announcement was itself used without permission. However, one source disputes this, saying the reporting is the result of conflation regarding a different anti-piracy ad that used stolen music composed in 2006.

The "ransom note" typeface used in the campaign was FF Confidential, designed by the Dutch typographer Just van Rossum. Reports arose in 2025 that the copy of the font used to design the commercial may not have been properly licensed. In April 2025, Sky News reported via extraction from old campaign PDFs that the actual font used was Xband-Rough, a widely-distributed pirated version of FF Confidential. Van Rossum was aware of the font Xband-Rough, but was unaware that the advert has used the pirated font and described its use as "hilarious". According to a different investigation by journalists, the pirated font was only in a domestic campaign by the British Federation Against Copyright Theft, who, contrary to popular belief, had no involvement in the making of the original PSA. The Federation responded by saying that everyone involved in the creation of the announcement was no longer at the organization.

== In popular culture ==
The advertisement has been parodied in Internet memes, including those using the phrase "You wouldn't download a car."

In 2007, The IT Crowd episode "Moss and the German" parodied the advertisement, mirroring its initial points before comparing copyright infringement to increasingly ludicrous crimes and consequences. Finlo Rohrer of the BBC considered this version to be "perhaps the best known" of over 100 parodies of the ad that had been created by 2009. In 2021, the old domain name used by the campaign (piracyisacrime.com) was purchased and redirected to a YouTube upload of the parody, possibly inspired by a Reddit discussion.

An advertisement for the 2008 film Futurama: Bender's Game parodied the campaign by having Bender repeatedly interrupt the narrator to say he would do the crimes described. The advertisement was titled "Downloading Often Is Terrible", or "D.O.I.T".

The Greens–European Free Alliance, in collaboration with Rafilm, released their own parody version of the film to oppose the media industry and government views on existing copyright laws, as well as to educate the public on alternative views about intellectual property.

External videos
- Australia Day (Piracy parody)

In 2017, The Juice Media produced a controversial parody of the video for Australia Day. The video compared the celebration of Australia Day, which marks the arrival of the First Fleet and is often referred to as "Invasion Day" by Indigenous Australians, to celebrating the Nazis' Final Solution, dropping the atomic bomb on Hiroshima and the September 11 attacks.

"You wouldn't screenshot an NFT" is a variant of the "You wouldn't steal a car" meme that satirizes non-fungible tokens, based on the idea that the ease of making digital copies of the work of art associated with an NFT undermines the value of purchasing the NFT.

== See also ==
- Beware of Illegal Videocassettes
- Don't Copy That Floppy
- Home Recording Rights Coalition
- Home Taping Is Killing Music
- Knock-off Nigel
- Piracy is theft
- Public information film (PIF)
- Spin (propaganda)
- Steal This Album!
- Steal This Film
- Who Makes Movies?
- You can click, but you can't hide
