= Wild in the U.S.A. =

Compilation album by Bow Wow Wow
- Released: 1998
- Recorded: 1997–1998
- Venues: The Bluebird Theater in Denver, Colorado & the Drama Club in Santa Fe, New Mexico
- Genre: New wave
- Length: 69:16
- Label: Cleopatra
- Producer: Eddie Ryan

Bow Wow Wow chronology
Live in Japan (1997)	Wild in the U.S.A. (1998)	I Want Candy — Anthology (2003)

Wild in the U.S.A. is a compilation album by English new wave band Bow Wow Wow, released solely on compact disc in 1998 by Cleopatra Records.

Wild in the U.S.A. is a 20-track compilation. The first six tracks are remixes of their greatest hits, and the last 14 tracks are from a U.S. tour that began in December 1997, and ended in March 1998. Two shows were used for this collection: the January 10, 1998 show at the Bluebird Theater in Denver, Colorado, and the March 7, 1998 show at the Drama Club in Santa Fe, New Mexico.

== Reception ==
The album was largely panned by critics. AllMusic critic Simon Cantlon said, "While the remixes work, the live songs drag this album down, making it of interest only for serious fans".

Cleopatra also drew criticism for the seemingly haphazard way the CD was thrown together. Tracks one and six (both remixes of "I Want Candy") are reversed in the track listing on the back of the CD, but are correctly listed on the sleeve. "Louis Quatorze" is referred to as "Louis Quartorze" on both.

== Track listing ==
Track listing
No.	Title	Length
1.	"I Want Candy" (Razed in Black Mix)	2:47
2.	"W.O.R.K." (Atomic Dog Mix Remixed by Wayne Hussey of the Mission UK))	4:15
3.	"C·30 C·60 C·90 Go!" (Remixed by Kevin Haskins of Love & Rockets Remix)	2:23
4.	"Do You Wanna Hold Me?" (CKB Remix)	3:03
5.	"W.O.R.K." (Spahn Ranch Mix)	2:40
6.	"I Want Candy" (Girl Eats Boy Remix)	3:04
7.	"Giant Sized Baby Thing"	2:38
8.	"Louis Quartorze"	2:20
9.	"Baby, Oh No"	2:44
10.	"Sexy Eiffel Tower"	2:54
11.	"See Jungle"	2:55
12.	"Mile High Club"	2:44
13.	"Uomo Sex Al Apache"	4:28
14.	"Prince of Darkness"	3:32
15.	"Go Wild in the Country"	5:47
16.	"Aphrodisiac"	2:23
17.	"I Want Candy"	3:00
18.	"C30 C60 C90 Go"	2:37
19.	"Do You Want to Hold Me"	3:03
20.	"What's the Time (Hey Buddy)"	2:24
Total length:		69:16

== Personnel ==
- Annabella Lwin - vocals
- Leigh Gorman - bass guitar
- Dave Calhoun - guitar
- Eshan Khadaroo - drums

In the liner notes, original drummer Dave Barbarossa (who was a member of Republica at the time) is thanked for giving them "the original grooves." The album is dedicated to original guitarist Matthew Ashman, who died a little over two years before the tour that resulted in this album.
