= GVU =

GVU may refer to:

- GVU (Utrecht), a defunct Dutch bus operator
- Gesellschaft zur Verfolgung von Urheberrechtsverletzungen e.V., a German entertainment industry copyright organization
- GVU Center at Georgia Tech
