= Your Box Set Pet (The Complete Recordings 1980–1984) =

Box set by Bow Wow Wow
- Released: 25 May 2018
- Recorded: 1980–1984
- Genre: New wave
- Length: 214:04
- Label: Cherry Red
- Producer: Bow Wow Wow; Malcolm McLaren

Bow Wow Wow chronology
| John Peel Session (20th October 1980) (2011) | Your Box Set Pet (The Complete Recordings 1980–1984) (2018) |

Your Box Set Pet (The Complete Recordings 1980–1984) is a three-disc box set compilation album by English new wave band Bow Wow Wow, released on 25 May 2018 by Cherry Red Records.

Disc one of the set consists of their first full-length studio album for RCA Records, See Jungle! See Jungle! Go Join Your Gang Yeah, City All Over! Go Ape Crazy! (1981), in its entirety, plus ten bonus tracks. The cover of the sleeve is the band's take on Édouard Manet’s Le Déjeuner sur l’herbe that was used on the cover of the original album and the EP Last of the Mohicans (1982).

Disc two consists of their second full-length RCA album, When the Going Gets Tough, the Tough Get Going (1983), in its entirety, plus eight bonus tracks.

The third disc, subtitled Singles, B-Sides & Remixes, contains their debut single, "C·30 C·60 C·90 Go" (1980), all eight tracks from the Your Cassette Pet mini-album (1980), and other singles and tracks recorded for EMI Records prior to their move to RCA Records. The cover of the sleeve for this disc is a nude image of lead singer Annabella Lwin painted gold taken by Jim Varriale, previously used for the cover of the 1982 RCA compilation album I Want Candy.

The cover of the actual box set is a play on the cover of Your Cassette Pet, with an old promo photo of Lwin added. It was issued in a clamshell case, and contains liner notes written by Lois Wilson of Mojo. While Your Box Set Pet was billed as the complete recordings of Bow Wow Wow, three tracks: the instrumentals "Bow Wow Wow", "Theme A" and a cover of the Roy Orbison-penned "Cast Iron Arm", that appeared on the 1993 EMI compilation Girl Bites Dog - Your Compact Disc Pet, were not included on this collection. The box set was compiled by Oli Hemingway, and all of the recordings were remastered by Fluid Mastering.

== Track listing ==
All tracks are written by Matthew Ashman, David Barbarossa, Leigh Gorman and Malcolm McLaren, except where noted.

Disc one: See Jungle! See Jungle! Go Join Your Gang Yeah, City All Over! Go Ape Crazy! (tracks 1–13) with bonus tracks (tracks 14–23)
| No. | Title | Writer(s) | Length |
|---|---|---|---|
| 1. | "Jungle Boy" | | 2:47 |
| 2. | "Chihuahua" | | 4:15 |
| 3. | "Sinner! Sinner! Sinner!" | Ashman, Barbarossa, Gorman, Annabella Lwin | 2:23 |
| 4. | "Mickey, Put It Down" | | 3:03 |
| 5. | "(I'm A) T.V. Savage" | | 2:40 |
| 6. | "Elimination Dancing" | | 3:04 |
| 7. | "Golly! Golly! Go Buddy!" | | 2:38 |
| 8. | "King Kong" | | 2:20 |
| 9. | "Go Wild in the Country" | | 2:44 |
| 10. | "I'm Not a Know It All" | | 2:54 |
| 11. | "Why Are Babies So Wise" | | 2:55 |
| 12. | "Orang-outang" | | 2:44 |
| 13. | "Hello, Hello Daddy (I'll Sacrifice You)" | | 4:28 |
| 14. | "See Jungle (Jungle Boy)" (7" Remix) | | 3:32 |
| 15. | "Chihuahua" (12" Version) | | 5:47 |
| 16. | "Prince of Darkness" | Ashman, Barbarossa, Gorman, Lwin | 2:23 |
| 17. | "Go Wild in the Country" (7" Version) | | 3:00 |
| 18. | "(I'm A) T.V. Savage" (7" Version) | | 2:37 |
| 19. | "Elimination Dancing" (New Version) | | 3:03 |
| 20. | "King Kong" (New Version) | | 2:24 |
| 21. | "Prince of Darkness" (12" Version) | Ashman, Barbarossa, Gorman, Lwin | 4:14 |
| 22. | "Go Wild in the Country" (12" Remix) | | 5:20 |
| 23. | "See Jungle (Jungle Boy)" (12" Remix) | | 5:12 |
| Total length: | | | 76:30 |

All tracks are written by Ashman, Barbarossa, Gorman and Lwin, except where noted.

Disc two: When the Going Gets Tough, the Tough Get Going (tracks 1–12) with bonus tracks (tracks 13–20)
| No. | Title | Writer(s) | Length |
|---|---|---|---|
| 1. | "Aphrodisiac" | | 2:58 |
| 2. | "'Do You Wanna Hold Me?'" | | 3:14 |
| 3. | "Roustabout" | | 2:20 |
| 4. | "Lonesome Tonight" | | 2:47 |
| 5. | "Love Me" | | 3:28 |
| 6. | "What's the Time (Hey Buddy)" | | 3:06 |
| 7. | "Mario (Your Own Way to Paradise)" | | 2:54 |
| 8. | "Quiver (Arrows in My)" | | 3:14 |
| 9. | "The Man Mountain" | | 2:26 |
| 10. | "Rikki Dee" | | 3:02 |
| 11. | "Tommy Tucker" | | 2:44 |
| 12. | "Love, Peace and Harmony" | | 2:50 |
| 13. | "Aphrodisiac" (7" Remix) | | 3:08 |
| 14. | "Do You Wanna Hold Me?" (12" USA Version) | | 4:49 |
| 15. | "Biological Phenomenon" | | 2:25 |
| 16. | "Love, Peace and Harmony" (USA Remix) | | 2:51 |
| 17. | "I Want Candy" (USA 12" Remix) | Bert Berns, Bob Feldman, Jerry Goldstein, Richard Gottehrer | 3:33 |
| 18. | "Aphrodisiac" (12" Version) | | 5:09 |
| 19. | "Love, Peace and Harmony" (12" USA Remix) | | 4:21 |
| 20. | "Where's My Snake?" | | 2:52 |
| Total length: | | | 64:32 |

All tracks are written by Ashman, Barbarossa, Gorman and McLaren, except where noted.

Disc three: Singles, B-Sides & Remixes
| No. | Title | Writer(s) | Length |
|---|---|---|---|
| 1. | "C-30, C-60, C-90, Go" | | 3:02 |
| 2. | "Sun, Sea and Piracy" | | 2:55 |
| 3. | "Louis Quatorze" | | 2:39 |
| 4. | "Gold He Said" | | 2:05 |
| 5. | "Uomo-Sex-Al Apache" | | 3:11 |
| 6. | "I Want My Baby on Mars" | | 2:24 |
| 7. | "Sexy Eiffel Towers" | | 2:25 |
| 8. | "Giant Sized Baby Thing" | | 2:21 |
| 9. | "Fools Rush In (Where Angels Fear to Tread)" | Rube Bloom, Johnny Mercer | 2:11 |
| 10. | "Radio G-String" | | 2:41 |
| 11. | "W.O.R.K (N.O. Nah No! No! My Daddy Don't)" | | 2:40 |
| 12. | "C-30, C-60, C-90 Anda!" | | 3:01 |
| 13. | "I Want Candy" (7" Version) | Berns, Feldman, Goldstein, Gottehrer | 2:44 |
| 14. | "El Boss Dicho" | | 2:11 |
| 15. | "Baby, Oh No" (7" Version) | Ashman, Barbarossa, Gorman, Lwin | 2:44 |
| 16. | "Mile High Club" | | 4:01 |
| 17. | "Louis Quatorze" (Re-Record) | | 2:50 |
| 18. | "Joy of Eating Raw Flesh" | | 3:23 |
| 19. | "Teenage Queen" | | 3:22 |
| 20. | "Cowboy" | Ashman, Barbarossa, Gorman, Pierre Grillet, Stephane Pietri | 3:32 |
| 21. | "Baby, Oh No" (12" Remix) | Ashman, Barbarossa, Gorman, Lwin | 5:38 |
| 22. | "Sex" | | 2:45 |
| 23. | "W.O.R.K (N.O. Nah No! No! My Daddy Don't)" (Special Remixed Disco Version) | | 5:21 |
| 24. | "Mile High Club" (Re-Record) | | 3:28 |
| Total length: | | | 73:44 |
