= HRRC =

HRRC may refer to:

- Home Recording Rights Coalition
- Housatonic Railroad, a Class III railroad operating in southwestern New England and New York
