= Radio music ripping =

Music radio ripping is the process of digitally extracting and saving songs played on the radio. Ripping is more than simply recording the audio. The key aspect of ripping is disambiguation. Ripped songs can be split into separate tracks or files, and may be tagged.

Different software, techniques and cloud services make it possible to extract the songs played on the radio and digitally save them on separate audio tracks. Available techniques make it possible to rip the music from Internet radio broadcasts, satellite radio broadcasts and FM radio broadcasts.

== Internet radio ==
Popular audio formats for Internet radio include AAC, AAC+, and MP3. Many AM/FM stations simulcast online use the more efficient AAC format while Internet-only streams more typically use MP3. The Shoutcast database featured 34,281 online radio stations covering almost every conceivable music genre.

Cloud recording services such as DAR.fm, Quick Record can record from all of these formats. Most PC based Internet radio ripping software is built for Shoutcast-style of streams as this MP3-based protocol offers the widest selection of Internet radio stations. Such wide selection of music is one of the major advantages for recording songs from Internet radio compared to FM and satellite radio as well as the fact that it works with cloud services that do not require a separate audio receiver. The disadvantages may include fairly low audio quality in the saved MP3s, which varies from stream to stream.

To begin the recording process, the software connects to the audio stream over TCP. The stream is then buffered 15–30 seconds ahead. Some Internet radio ripping software, utilize special metadata that are being sent along with actual song content. These programs are generally more successful in determining the boundaries of songs (providing for a cleaner MP3 cut) as well as correctly identifying the song in question. Such metadata, however, are available for only a subset of Internet streams, commonly associated with the Shoutcast standard. The existence of open directories of Shoutcast-compliant radio stations such as Shoutcast enables Internet radio rippers to provide an abundant selection of recordable radio stations that are reasonably expected to emit detailed song metadata. The metadata also help avoid commercials from being recorded along with the songs.

== Satellite radio ==
TimeTrax has developed software that can record the audio broadcast on XM satellite radio. The software saves songs as individual MP3 files after identifying the name and the artist. TimeTrax is both a software and hardware solution: the TimeTrax software can interface with any PC-compatible satellite receiver, and the adapter box is necessary to allow certain receivers to interface with a PC.

The XM PCR was the first device to allow audio stream ripping from XM radio. The device itself is simple enough: an XM "can" (the actual receiver and decoding hardware) is enclosed in a box with a USB interface chip and audio connector. The PCR plugs into a PC USB port and line-in jack. TimeTrax, or some other similar software, then controls the radio and records the incoming audio. After a legal battle, the TimeTrax software is no longer being sold.

To end the problem for good, XM discontinued the XM PCR receiver. However, TimeTrax almost immediately released a hardware companion product that turned virtually any device capable of receiving XM satellite radio and its primary competitor at the time, Sirius Satellite Radio. Timetrax went on to also include the ability to rip and tag music from the online music streaming services that were being provided by both XM and Sirius.

Notably, TimeTrax went on to extend its technology in a seamless package for FM radio, and further, any music source. It developed this portion of its technology hardware and software offering with Swedish company PopCatcher. TimeTrax was the first company that offered music ripping (a.k.a. audio disambiguation, ripping and tagging, de-aggregation) for the three largest and widespread music distribution methods: satellite radio, Internet streaming and traditional broadcast.

The original TimeTrax software was developed by a Canadian, Scott MacLean. Its popularity resulted in a corporation and formal management team along with funding focused on MacLean's work. The company was led by business executive Elliott Frutkin.

== FM radio ==
There are two ways of ripping songs from an FM broadcast.

=== Radio Data System ===
Some FM receivers are capable of receiving Radio Data System (RDS) data. This data provides artist and title information that can be shown on the display of a compatible FM receiver. A compatible receiver, connected to the computer, can tag saved audio streams with these data. The disadvantage of RDS is that the title may change before or after the song itself changes, causing the recording process to miss part of the beginning or end of the song. Some stations also use their display text as a secondary means of advertising themselves or a sponsor and might refuse outright to display title/artist text.

RDS includes a new feature called RT+ or Radio Text Plus. As well as providing discrete text fields for Artist, Album & Track Title, RT+ includes 'item running' and 'item toggle' bits which can be used to accurately mark the track transitions and DJ/commercial interruptions, aiding the process of recording, filenaming and ID3 tagging.

=== Manual tagging ===
Certain recording packages allow the user to set markers in the file, which the user can use later to split the file into separate tracks. This process can be tedious and time consuming, but has the advantage of being the only truly reliable way to ensure that the song is captured as accurately as possible without cutting off the beginning or end of a track.

== Legal issues ==
This expanding way of ripping music may lead to 'strong legal debates' in a near future, even if it is permitted to record music from the radio for private use in most countries. In Germany it is allowed. There even is a campaign to put focus on it. It is called TauschNix, which in essence stands for: no need to download via filesharing. See link below.

=== European context ===
The European Union passed in May 2001 the Information Society Directive which has since then been transposed into the national laws of most of the Member States. Article 5 – 2/b of the directive states that "[Member States may provide for exceptions or limitations to the reproduction right provided for] in respect of reproductions on any medium made by a natural person for private use and for ends that are neither directly nor indirectly commercial, on condition that the rightholders receive fair compensation which takes account of the application or non-application of technological measures referred to in Article 6 [ie. Digital Rights Management ] to the work or subject-matter concerned".

In short, copying music from the radio for private use is permissible if the artists receive a "fair compensation". In case of a lawsuit against radio music ripping technologies, the whole debate will be about the meaning of the term "fair compensation". It can be argued that Radio stations are already paying a "fair compensation" to artists as they know their songs might be copied. Moreover, in an increasing number of EU member states, importers are charged a private copying levy on the purchase of recordable media (MP3 players, writable CDs or DVDs). The tax or levy is usually administrated by copyright collectives. However, at the time of digital copies, the outcome of such a lawsuit is far from being certain if it should occur.

=== UK context ===
Beginning in 1981, the British Phonographic Industry began a campaign against so-called "home taping", or recording songs from the radio onto cassettes, due to fears that home taping would decrease album sales. Iconic of the campaign is a picture of the silhouette of a cassette tape, with two crossed bones underneath, with the words "HOME TAPING IS KILLING MUSIC" written across the top, and the words "AND IT'S ILLEGAL" printed in smaller letters at the bottom.

=== US context ===
Traditionally, the recording industry expressed little or no concern with individuals who recorded music from the radio on a cassette recorder. However, the digital format in this case changes the whole issue since it does not degrade over time and can be easily copied.

The Audio Home Recording Act also lays out certain legal rights on the part of consumers.

== See also ==
- Ripping
- Old-time radio § Home radio recordings in the United States
- Home Recording Rights Coalition
- Sony Corp. of America v. Universal City Studios, Inc.
