= Operation Red Card =

2006 Motion Picture Association anti-piracy drive in Asia

Operation Red Card is the name given to a two-month Asia-wide anti-piracy operation that was conducted by the Motion Picture Association (MPA) (the international arm of the Motion Picture Association of America) which resulted in the seizure of 6.7 million pirated discs in 12 countries across the Asia-Pacific region. The operation took place between May and mid-July 2006, resulting in 915 arrests and the seizure of 1,483 optical disc burners.

There were 1,919 raids conducted in 12 countries throughout Asia.

- In China, 405 raids resulted in the seizure of over 1.96 million discs.
- Raids in Indonesia brought in 305 DVD burners and 2.16 million discs.
- In Malaysia, there were 128 arrests and 1.18 million optical discs seized in 455 raids.

The MPAA has been conducting anti-piracy sweeps on a twice a year basis, with more than 2,500 arrests and the seizure of over 23 million illegal videos so far.

According to the MPAA, its members—which encompass all of the major film studios in Hollywood—lost $1.2 billion a year in revenue due to piracy and illegal downloading.

The name Operation Red Card is a reference to the red card issued by a referee to a player ejected from a football game for unsportsmanlike conduct or repeated fouls.
