= PopCatcher =

Swedish audio research company

PopCatcher is a Swedish audio research company founded in 2000. In 2002, they patented a software that is able to distinguish between music, DJ talks and commercials. The main application of this software is for ripping songs from FM broadcasts.

In December 2007, PopCatcher released a product in Europe, again causing several technology weblogs such as Engadget and Gizmodo to mention it. The product enables ripping songs from FM broadcasts into any portable mp3 player. The product name is The Ripper, in Scandinavia, and branded The Rebel by Intempo digital for the rest of Europe. It has an FM radio which saves up to 40 songs as MP3 files and removes DJ chat and adverts. The product can download the songs directly to an iPod, MP3 player or music mobile phone.
