= Your Cassette Pet =

EP by Bow Wow Wow
- Released: 10 November 1980
- Recorded: 1980
- Genres: New wave; post-punk; punk rock
- Length: 20:01
- Label: EMI
- Producers: Bow Wow Wow; Malcolm McLaren

Bow Wow Wow chronology
Your Cassette Pet (1980)	See Jungle! See Jungle! Go Join Your Gang Yeah, City All Over! Go Ape Crazy! (1981)

Girl Bites Dog - Your Compact Disc Pet

Professional ratings
Review scores
Source	Rating
Christgau's Record Guide	B+

Your Cassette Pet is the cassette-only debut mini-album by English new wave band Bow Wow Wow, released in November 1980 on EMI Records.

== Release ==
Your Cassette Pet contained only eight tracks (plus an instrumental secret track), and was not available on vinyl. Therefore, it was eligible only for the UK Singles Chart, where it peaked at No. 58, and not the UK Albums Chart.

Two of the more notorious tracks from Your Cassette Pet are "Sexy Eiffel Towers" and "Louis Quatorze". "Sexy Eiffel Towers" included suggestive moaning and heavy breathing performed by then-14-year-old Lwin. "Louis Quatorze", which called attention to Lwin's young age, described a sexual assault at gun point. Your Cassette Pet also included a cover of the 1940 Johnny Mercer/Rube Bloom pop hit "Fools Rush In".

In 1982, to capitalize on the success of the "I Want Candy" music video on MTV, and the I Want Candy album on RCA, EMI released an LP record, also titled I Want Candy, containing all eight original tracks from Your Cassette Pet, plus eight additional tracks. Among them were their first single, "C·30 C·60 C·90 Go" (which holds the distinction of being the world's first-ever cassette single), their second single, "W.O.R.K (N.O. Nah No! No! My Daddy Don't)", and their respective B-sides. The EMI album reached number 26 on the UK Album chart. An abridged version with 12 tracks - Twelve Original Recordings - was released for North American audiences. This was released in territories other than the UK and North America as Original Recordings

In 1993, EMI released Girl Bites Dog - Your Compact Disc Pet on CD. Girl Bites Dog contained all 16 tracks from the EMI I Want Candy, an extended version of "W.O.R.K (N.O. Nah No! No! My Daddy Don't)", and a cover of Roy Orbison's "Cast Iron Arm".

On 25 May 2018, Cherry Red Records released the three-disc set Your Box Set Pet (The Complete Recordings 1980–1984). The third disc, subtitled Singles, B-Sides & Remixes contains Your Cassette Pet in its entirety (tracks 3–10) except for "Bow Wow Wow", the unlisted short piece of instrumental music in between "Sexy Eiffel Towers" and "Giant Sized Baby Thing", which is missing.

== Track listing ==
All tracks are written by David Barbarossa, Leigh Gorman, Malcolm McLaren and Matthew Ashman, except where noted.

Side one
No.	Title	Length
1.	"Louis Quatorze"	2:39
2.	"Gold He Said"	2:05
3.	"Uomo Sex Al Apache"	3:11
4.	"I Want My Baby on Mars"	2:24

Side two
No.	Title	Writer(s)	Length
5.	"Sexy Eiffel Tower"		2:25
6.	"Bow Wow Wow" (unlisted instrumental)		1:17
7.	"Giant Sized Baby Thing"		2:21
8.	"Fools Rush In"	Johnny Mercer, Rube Bloom	2:11
9.	"Radio G String"		2:41
Total length:			21:14

Original Recordings, Side one
No.	Title	Writer(s)	Length
1.	"C·30 C·60 C·90 Go"		2:54
2.	"Louis Quatorze"		2:36
3.	"Gold He Said"		2:04
4.	"Mile High Club"		3:50
5.	"Fools Rush In"	Johnny Mercer, Rube Bloom	2:08
6.	"Radio G. String"		2:50
7.	"Uomo Sex Al Apache"		3:08
8.	"Theme A"		1:53

Side two
No.	Title	Length
9.	"W.O.R.K (N.O. Nah No! No! My Daddy Don't)"	2:39
10.	"Sexy Eiffel Tower"	2:22
11.	"I Want My Baby On Mars"	2:21
12.	"Sun Sea and Piracy" (B-side of "C·30 C·60 C·90 Go")	2:54
13.	"Giant Sized Baby Thing"	2:22
14.	"C30, C60, C90 Anda"	2:34
15.	"Bow Wow Wow" (Instrumental)	1:17
16.	"Sex"	2:39
Total length:		41:47

Girl Bites Dog - Your Compact Disc Pet
No.	Title	Writer(s)	Length
1.	"Bow Wow Wow"		1:19
2.	"Sex"		2:46
3.	"W.O.R.K (N.O. Nah No! No! My Daddy Don't)"		2:39
4.	"Louis Quatorze"		2:38
5.	"Gold He Said"		2:04
6.	"I Want My Baby on Mars"		2:23
7.	"Sexy Eiffel Towers"		2:24
8.	"Fools Rush In"	Johnny Mercer, Rube Bloom	2:10
9.	"Radio G String"		2:41
10.	"C·30 C·60 C·90 Go"		3:01
11.	"Sun Sea and Piracy" (B-side of "C·30 C·60 C·90 Go")		2:54
12.	"Uomo Sex Al Apache"		3:11
13.	"Giant Sized Baby Thing"		2:22
14.	"Mile High Club"		4:02
15.	"Cast Iron Arm"	Roy Orbison, Norman Petty, Jim Scott	3:00
16.	"Theme A"		1:58
17.	"W.O.R.K (N.O. Nah No! No! My Daddy Don't)" (Extended Version)		5:21
18.	"C·30 C·60 C·90 Anda" (B-side of "W.O.R.K. (N.O. Nah No! No! My Daddy Don't)")		3:01
Total length:			50:09

== Personnel ==
Bow Wow Wow

- Annabella Lwin - vocals
- Matthew Ashman - guitar
- Leigh Gorman - bass
- Dave Barbarossa - drums

Technical

- Pat Stapley - engineer
