= Gesellschaft zur Verfolgung von Urheberrechtsverletzungen e.V. =

Coordinates: 52°31′26.34″N 13°19′41.2″E

Society for the Prosecution of Copyright Infringement
- Native name: GVU - Gesellschaft zur Verfolgung von Urheberrechtsverletzungen e.V.
- Type: Registered Association
- Industry: Movies and Games
- Founded: Berlin, Germany (February 27, 1985)
- Defunct: 29 May 2020
- Headquarters: Berlin, Germany
- Key people: Vincent de la Tour (Chairman), Matthias Leonardy (Managing Director)
- Website: www.gvu.de

The Gesellschaft zur Verfolgung von Urheberrechtsverletzungen e.V. (GVU, Society for the Prosecution of Copyright Infringement) was a registered association under German law. According to its own description, it works for the video game industry and film industry and helps to protect intellectual property and to counter the illegal distribution of copied materials. For this purpose, the association cooperates with the Motion Picture Association of America (MPAA, now the MPA).

The GVU was founded in the spring of 1984 and entered the register of associations in February 1985 for the first time. The headquarters were located first in Hamburg, since 2008 they have been in Berlin-Mitte. The GVU became known to a wider public by participating in campaigns such as "pirates are criminals“ and investigations in the Kino.to case.

== History ==
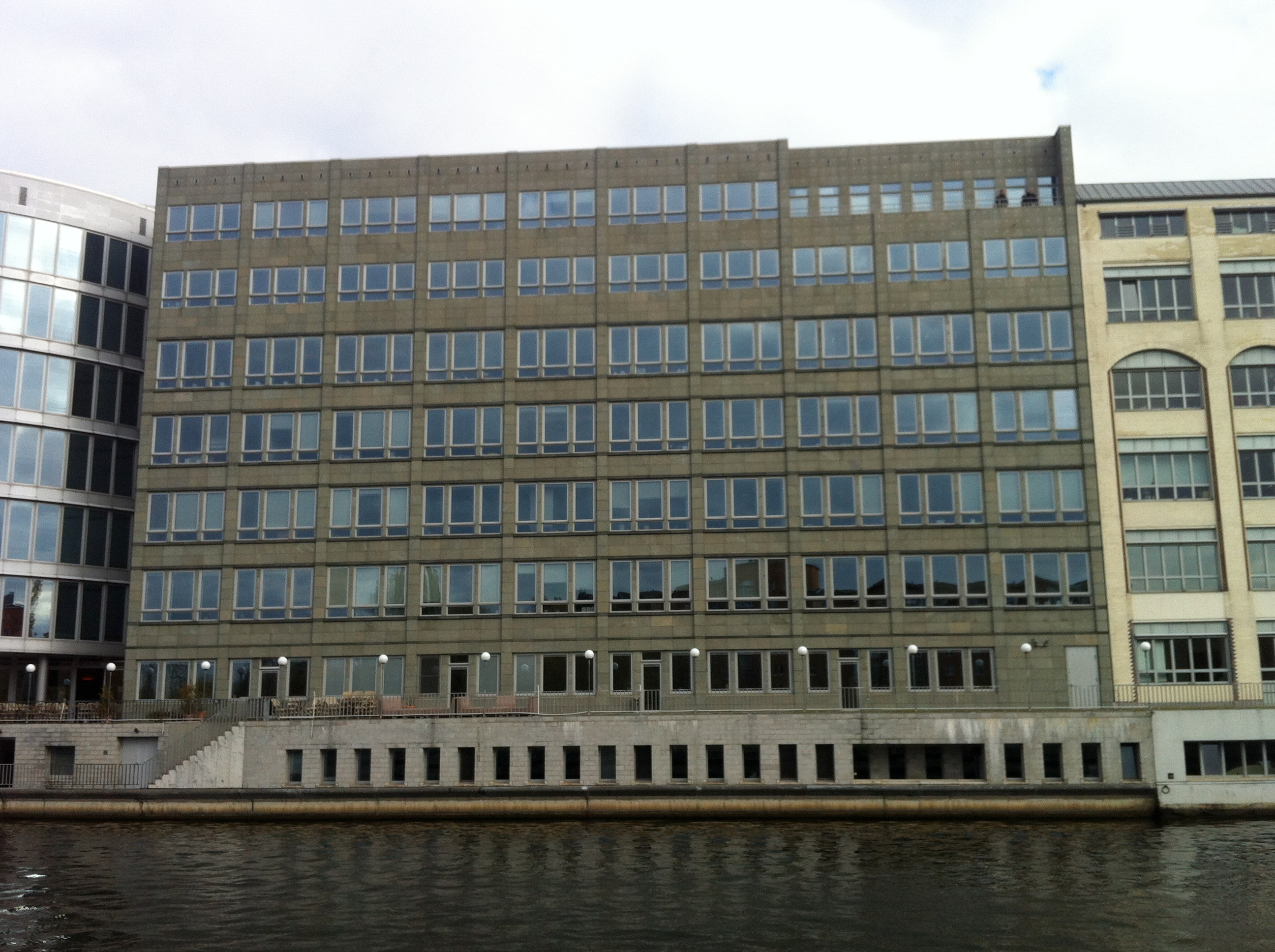
Headquarters in Berlin (Quarter Mitte)

=== Early years ===
Against the backdrop of a rapidly increasing demand for movies on VHS and an increase in "piracy" at the same time, film industry representatives agreed in early 1984 to set up a separate company to combat illegal distribution of copyrighted material. The decision was primarily driven by the motivation of the industry, to detach from the International Federation of the Phonographic Industry (IFPI). The longtime chairman of the Bundesverband Audiovisuelle Medien (BVV, Federal Association of Audiovisual Media) and Managing Director of the German subsidiary of Twentieth Century Fox Home Entertainment, Bodo Schwartz, was key in the establishment of GVU.

The establishment of the GVU as a legally registered association was formally announced in the autumn of 1984 at the HiFi trade fair in Düsseldorf. The first constitution was adopted on December 17, 1984. It first entered the register of the city of Hamburg on February 27, 1985, finalising the establishment of the association on that day. Next to Bodo Schwartz, Paul Miller of the Cinema International Corporation (CIC) and Manfred Goller of the Verband der Filmverleiher (VDF, Association of Film Distributors) were members of the founding board.

=== Software Era ===
After exclusive funding of the GVU by the movie industry in its initial years, the organisations range of tasks expanded in 1997 to include computer games. On the one hand this was due to the parallels between illegal copies of films and games - both in the production and distribution - and on the other hand, the simpler distribution of unauthorized material over the emerging Internet. Sony Computer Entertainment’s membership of the GVU in 1997 initiated the membership of the entire Entertainment Software Association in the GVU in the following year.

In 2000, Microsoft entered the GVU as the first member of the software industry, which represented a significant milestone for the work of the GVU and directed the attention of the general public to the association. Simultaneously, this resulted in an expansion of the range of GVU’s tasks. As early as in 2001, the GVU took over the administration of the organization SAFE, which is responsible for the fight against copyright infringement in Switzerland. At the same time, cooperation intensified with the Austrian Verein für Anti-Piraterie (VAP, Association for Anti-Piracy) in the film and video industry, so the entire German-speaking area was fully covered.

=== Management ===
The statutes of the GVU provides that the board consists of a chairman and at least three others. The GVU is represented jointly by at least two board members. In November 2012, the committee included Vincent de La Tour (Chairman), Dr. Holger Ensslin, Violetta Psofiou, Ralph Tübben, Alexander Skipis and Dr. Bernd Fakesch. According to the Commercial Register there are committees for finance, legal and technology. Next to the executive board the association has a full-time executive director who is responsible for the daily operations and reports to the Board. Dr. Matthias Leonardy currently holds this position, who previously worked as a general counsel for the German eBay Group.

Work and structure of the GVU was mainly characterized by Bodo Schwartz, who was on the executive board for over 20 years and led it as Chairman for a long time. He also represented the GVU to media and shaped the image of the association in the public, including through various interviews. Schwartz retired from his position of CEO of Twentieth Century Fox in 2002, and retired from the GVU in October 2006. His retirement speech in late January 2007 was held by Sabine Leutheusser-Schnarrenberger.

== Members ==
In 2011, a total of about 50 companies and organizations were represented as a member of the GVU. In the field of film this includes virtually all major Hollywood studios, such as Sony Pictures, Twentieth Century Fox, Paramount Pictures, Warner Bros. and Walt Disney Studios. Members from the gaming industry include Ubisoft, Microsoft, Activision, Konami and Koch Media as well as respective affiliates of the major film studios. In addition, in its Annual Report 2011, the service providers arvato, Cinram, OpSec and Rovi got quoted as members.

A special role is played by the membership of numerous professional organizations, in which the interests and positions of certain industries are bundled. So for example currently the Bundesverband Musikindustrie (BVMI, Federal Association of Music Industry), the Bundesverband Informationswirtschaft, Telekommunikation und neue Medien (BITKOM, German Association for Information Technology, Telecommunications and New Media) and the Bundesverband Interaktive Unterhaltungssoftware (BIU, Federal Association of Interactive Entertainment Software) belong to the GVU. The Motion Picture Association of America (MPAA), one of the foremost organizations against copyright infringement in the English speaking world, is a full member too.

Overall, in 2011, nine organizations, 21 films- and 15 games providers and five other companies supported the GVU. Over the last five years the number of members has remained largely constant. However, as a result of the 2008 financial crisis, the association lost some companies from the movie industry. The most prominent example in this case is the production and distribution company Metro-Goldwyn-Mayer, which in 2007 was still listed as a member of the GVU, but no longer in the following year. MGM went into administration in 2010 and withdrew from other industry associations.

Since 2007, the GVU has published annually a list of its members. Organizations and companies indirectly involved in the GVU through third-party associations are not explicitly listed in it.

== Activities ==
The activities of the Association focuses on preventing economic losses of its members, resulting from unauthorized copying and its dissemination. The GVU estimated the loss at several hundred million euros annually. In addition to those defined in the constitution, the association based its efforts primarily on copyright law.

=== Investigations ===
The association applies a large part of its resources to the actual detection of copyright infringements. The action is driven by the view that government agencies alone cannot monitor the entire market for unlicensed content, which is why the GVU tries to fill this gap. The employees of the GVU, including former police officers and commissioners, systematically scour the relevant sources of illegal copies, especially on the Internet. Unlike other organizations, by its own admission the GVU does not primarily aim at end-consumers, rather, it targets mainly the "big fishes". Besides those people who for example record a movie at the cinema or make copies from a computer game, these increasingly include the operators of so-called Trackers.

The GVU mainly focuses on large, internationally active release groups where copyrighted products are reproduced and distributed systematically, especially for profit. In its work, the association - if possible - accesses to public registers, for example, to reveal the real people behind a shell company. Due to their private-sector activity, the GVU may not identify IP addresses directly. Instead the association directs this as evidence to the relevant authorities. This is usually done as part of criminal procedure, which then leads to public prosecutorial investigations. Unless a criminal procedure is actually opened, an employee of the association often act as an expert witness. Not every complaint will automatically lead to a successful prosecution, for example the GVU had to make a total of three applications in the case of Kino.to.

As far as it is known to date, the GVU does not claim damages from warez users according to civil law. Instead the association allows its members the freedom to make possible claims for losses incurred. However, the association engages in strongly communicating its legal opinion in individual cases. Particularly in cases related to so-called illegal streaming of copied content, many legal assessments and opinions remain debatable.

=== Public Relations ===
In addition to its investigative activities the GVU does intensive public relations, which aims to raise awareness of copyright infringement. In the years 2009 to 2011 members of the association participated in nearly 100 events and reached about 2.000 participants through their speeches. In addition, since the late 80s the GVU has offered seminars for police officers and prosecutors, where they can learn about the consequences of "piracy" as well as the activities of the association.

In 1990, the GVU launched a prevention program on the topic of holography, a technology making it easier for retailers and consumers to identify unauthorized copied media. In addition, the association was known to a wider audience through the campaign "Pirates are criminals". This was produced by a subsidiary of the Central Association of German Film Theatres, where the GVU sits on the advisory board. During the World Cup 2006 an action of the umbrella organization MPAA was supported by Pelé.

Since 2008, the GVU has performed annually the so-called ROOF-industry forum together with VAP and SAFE, which recently took place in the Kalkscheune venue in Berlin. At the event, lawyers, representatives of the games and movie industries are brought together with trade associations and other stakeholders under the slogan "prevention and education". In 2011, the study of digital content usage (short DCN study) received large attention, since it was the first to cover the specific uses of legal and illegal online content. The study was prepared by the GVU and the Bundesverband Musikindustrie (Federal Association of Music Industry) as well as the Börsenverein des Deutschen Buchhandels (Association of German Book Trade).

=== Political Influence ===
Beside the main activities, GVU also gives advice to politicians and represents its interests there. For example, the association - as well as others around the globe - requested a "piracy" warning. This should be presented to an Internet user as soon as it first wants to call a pirated copy, but this remains controversial in Germany. In the course of this particular position, the GVU criticized the Federal Ministry of Justice. Furthermore, the association has complained for years that in case of copyright infringement there is a right of access to Internet service providers, but this would fail due to the lack of storage of communication data ("web problem").

The GVU also calls to execute the missing third basket of the reform of copyright law at last. Likewise, the trend towards trivialisation of copyright infringement by individual politicians criticized repeatedly, most recently in an article by Frank-Walter Steinmeier and Paul van Dyk in TIME.

== Proceedings ==
The investigations conducted by the association were influenced by technological progress over the years: After the beginning of the 80s the fight against pirated VHS tapes were in the spotlight, many prosecutions in the 90s and the following years related to the distribution of movies and games via peer-to-peer networks. Since 2010 streaming has taken an increasingly larger space.

The number of cases opened in the years 2007 to 2011 fell from 576 to 204. The decrease is mainly due to the fact that since 2008 many prosecutors have focused on those investigations in which more than 200 copies of a work were produced. The GVU in its own words has adopted this trend and focuses its investigative activities increasingly on major cases.

In addition to the operations that stern directly from GVU investigations, the association supports those proceedings initiated by the relevant legal authorities. In addition, each year several proceedings are officially reported, which were initiated jointly by law enforcement agencies and the GVU. About a quarter of all cases result in a verdict or penalty order.

=== Significant Cases ===
In recent years, the GVU has uncovered many release groups and other networks, some of which stand out because of their size or importance. Especially if in the course of the investigation a house search takes place, the respective cases and the activities of the association experienced increased media attention. Mentioned in the annual reports of the GVU important procedures include the following:

- In September 2007, 50 properties were searched simultaneously in Germany, the Netherlands, France and Belgium. The aim of the objective, which was launched by the GVU project "autumn storms", was primarily to obtain evidence. According to media reports, a total of 60 computers and 15 hard drives were seized. The GVU itself evaluates the action a success, for example by Keinohrhasen was no unauthorized copy in circulation until 2007.
- Also in the same year a person could be found who was responsible for the spread of so-called first seeding the first illegal version of Spider-Man 3. The person was also senior member of a release group that was responsible for numerous other software "piracy".
- In March 2008, a request by the MPAA umbrella organization caused that the GVU has started investigations against the operator of an internet portal, that offered primarily latest films like Rush Hour 3. In the course of the proceedings it became clear that behind the offer stood a broad network, which had connections to the U.S. and Australia. Following a criminal complaint of the GVU the Frankfurt Criminal Police confiscated ten servers of the group, which were hosted there in one datacenter.
- Earlier this year, the GVU acted against a Payserver-ring that gave users access to pirated copies for a fee. In this case 13 terabytes of data were provided for a total of more than 10,000 registered users. In addition the association led a criminal conduct against operators of so-called trackers in BitTorrent network.
- In the spring of 2009 this led to another spectacular lawsuit: After raids in Lüneburg, Wolfenbüttel and Braunschweig three men were arrested, who ran a tracker with 24,500 copied movies, TV shows, games, audiobooks, eBooks, music and software. This was characterized particularly by the fact that every user had to pay a fee to access the tracker. In addition, extensive instructions were provided to make the access to pirate copies simply as possible for less experienced people too.
- The annual report also points to another important event: In 2005, the Swiss organization SAFE had received a notice of information about a large Payserver ring. Since the physical location was in Germany, the persecution was handed over to the local association. The GVU set a criminal complaint against the head of the server in 2009.
- In March 2010, the GVU presented a criminal complaint, which was directed against a projectionist from North Rhine-Westphalia. The projectionist was one of the most active Cinegroups and procured high-quality pirated audio material for the production of pirated copies. The investigations of the association revealed that they were identical to the original material even to the audio watermarking. The group ended their activities completely after the arrest of the projectionist.
- Another complaint in the same year was directed against the streaming hosting clickandload on which more than 20 terabytes of pirated copies were provided. According to the GVU-investigation the platform was organized as far-flung release group and, in particular, those who provided an illegally copy, shared revenue from advertising on the site. During the police investigation the portal was completely shut down. Against the relevant uploader clickandload also proceedings were initiated.

In the following years, the association wants especially to tackle the financing of "piracy". The aim of the operation is to prevent professional service of ad-funded websites with pirated works.

=== Platform Kino.to ===
Message from the Criminal Police

The most important proceeding of the GVU in the last decade was against Kino.to. In June 2011 Kino.to was one of the 50 most visited sites in Germany and was thus well known to the general public. According to the film industry over 96 per cent of visitors were located in Germany, Austria and Switzerland. At Kino.to it was possible to view tens of thousands of videos via so-called Streams, including numerous high-quality movies and TV series.

Since Kino.to has become available in March 2008, the GVU was determined to go against its backers. According to the GVU, the process was difficult, as those behind Kino.to had specifically concealed their identities. For example, the top-level domain .to was chosen, as the responsible authority in Tonga does not releases any information about the respective owners of domains. Only when the third formal complaint by the Association was reported to the authorities in Dresden on April 28, 2011, the desired outcome was achieved: In early June, in raids across several European countries, several persons were arrested who were directly involved in Kino.to - including the owner Dirk B.

Mainly responsible for the success was the Integrierte Ermittlungseinheit Sachsen (INES, Integrated Detection Unit Saxony). During the course of process Kino.to was shut down on the suspicion of the backers forming a criminal organization and copyright infringement on an industrial scale. A message relating to the criminal investigation is now found at Kino.to. What is seen in the film industry as a major success fuelled huge criticisms by the majority of Kino.to users.

As a direct result of the closure of Kino.to, Anonymous started an attack on the Web server of the GVU, which finally led to an overload and failure of the website. In addition under the name KinoX.to a portal got created which is a direct descendant of Kino.to. The GVU has now also initiated an investigation into this portal. In addition, the association and authorities are investigating the advertising and marketing of Kino.to and KinoX.to.

== Malware ==
A Trojan, which had been discovered for the first time on 20 March 2012, used the logo of GVU without permission of the Association. It targets and infects PCs running Microsoft Windows XP or later versions and claims to have locked the PC on behalf of the GVU, as pirated content had been detected on it. In fact not a single file on the hard disk is checked; however the user is prompted to pay a fee in order to regain access to the computer. Usually, the requested amount is between 50 and 100 euros and is to be paid via paysafecard or (now defunct) Ukash.

Meanwhile, numerous variants of the GVU Trojan are circulating purporting to be a program of the Bundesamt für Sicherheit in der Informationstechnik (BSI, Federal Office for Information Security) or the Gesellschaft für musikalische Aufführungs- und mechanische Vervielfältigungsrechte (GEMA, Society for musical performing and mechanical reproduction rights). Due to the widespread use of the Trojan, in August 2012 the GVU released its first statement regarding the malware, aimed in particular at the malware authors. It was speculated that the Trojan was written by operators of illegal streaming portals in order to open up new financial sources. The page KinoX.to which strongly resembles Kino.to was used for the mass dissemination of new variants of the malware according to GVU.

== Criticism ==
In January 2006 the GVU was itself under investigation. The state prosecution of Ellwangen accused the association of having promoted the illegal distribution of copyrighted material. As the accusation details the association had allegedly had financial dealings with an administrator of the so-called IOH server, over which numerous release groups had collected and distributed copied content. In addition, the association got accused of directly providing hardware for the operation of the server.

During the course of the investigation the business premises of the GVU in Hamburg, as well as the home of a senior employee, were searched. The GVU has officially confirmed the raid and, according to the authorities, made available all of the information. Due to the particular urgency of the case, the action gained widespread media attention. However, suspicions against the association have not been confirmed. The investigation has since halted.

Also, during another investigation, the role of the GVU was criticised: The Kiel District Court said that during the course of proceedings against a suspected software pirates, it is essential to ensure the independence of police investigative work. Specifically, there were complaints that an employee of the GVU had worked as an expert in the process and at the same time had a free hand in the analysis of seized computers. The requirement of impartiality, not only for judges but also for prosecutors and the police had, in their opinion, not been fully safeguarded. Investigating authorities were prohibited to privatize their work.

Also, the strategy of the GVU in luring software pirates through a so-called honey pot trap has remained a subject of criticism. For example, during the course a raid in autumn 2007 suspicions were raised that the GVU and other organizations had installed open FTP servers on network, intended for the use by release groups, thus enabling the determination release group members based on their IP address. According to the unanimous opinion of experts, this approach is, at least legally, unobjectionable.

Individual media outlets have criticised the GVU’s close proximity to lawyers, prosecutors, police and internet service providers, although naturally these kind of co-operations are part of the work of any interest group. The Association’s close cooperation with various other organizations is repeatedly criticized, especially during its annual Industry Forum.

In August 2010, the GVU was suspected of having caused the unjustified removal of several posts on the video platform Vimeo, which had been published under a Creative Commons license and are therefore available to all. Among other contents, "You are a terrorist" and "Electric Reporter" were affected. During the course of the investigation into the case it was revealed that the removal of the content was not initiated by the association, but by the company OpSec Security, based in Munich. The authors Alexander Lehmann and Mario Sixtus were able to obtain an injunction against the company and the GVU has since explicitly distanced itself from the company. According to the GVU, OpSec Security had at no point been contracted to clear videos from Vimeo in its name.
