= XM PCR =

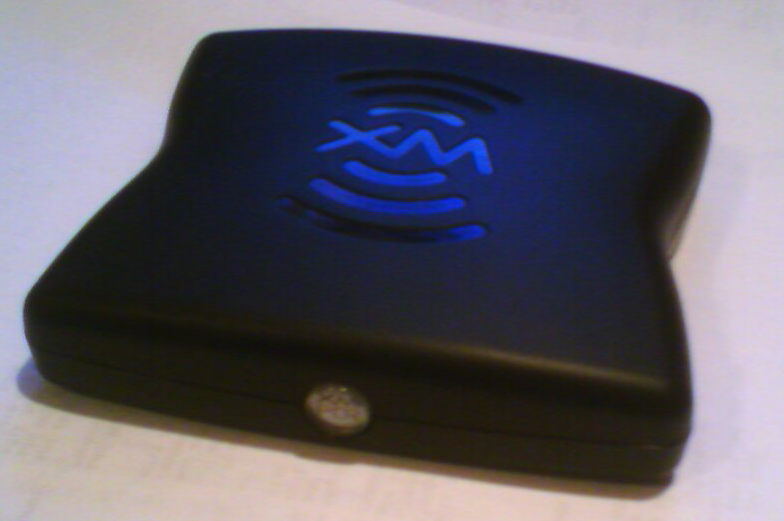
XM PCR Receiver

The XM PCR is a satellite receiver sold by XM Radio and discontinued in 2004, amidst piracy concerns. Programs allowed users to record every song played on an XM channel, quickly and cheaply building an MP3 library.

== History ==
The Personal Computer Receiver (PCR) was first announced in 2003. The next year, XM pulled the PCRs from the market, reportedly due to music piracy.

== Enhancements ==
Several enhancements have been created for the PCR, both software and hardware. In the software arena, PCR Replacement programs have been sprouting up on Internet forums and web sites. These are software packages that replace the interface included with the PCR, XMMT. Several features have been added to these new programs, including the ability to rip songs and build an MP3 library, time shift shows so that the user can listen at a more convenient time, control the radio via a web browser, and stream audio to other computers. Some web sites also offer a playlist log, which allows a user to browse a list of all the recently played songs or shows.

A hardware modification has also been discovered that allows the addition of a TOSLINK optical output, allowing users to connect the PCR to the optical digital input on a home theater receiver.

== Replacements ==
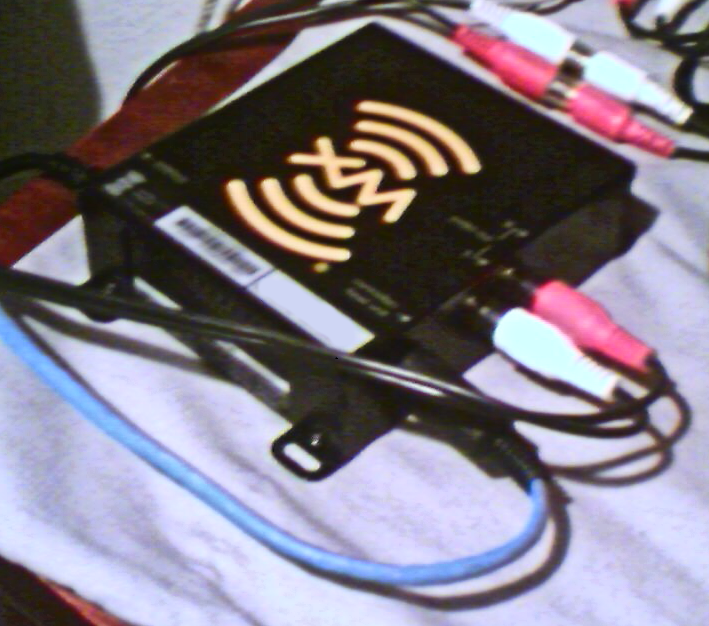
XM Direct Receiver with homemade Smart Cable

The XM Direct receiver, also marketed as the XM Commander, can now serve the same purpose as the PCR. While the XM Direct is intended for automotive use, the unit itself is controlled by RS-232 command signals, and so is easily adapted to PC control. When combined with a "smart cable", which is really just a USB to Serial cable and a wiring adapter to connect to the XM Direct's control port, the XM Direct supports some features not found on the original PCR.

The XM Mini tuner may also hold promise for hardware tweakers. It uses the newest XM tuner and is much smaller than the XM Direct. Like the Direct, the Mini is designed to be used with an external system, in this case a home theater receiver. Unlike the Direct, the Mini is also capable of receiving XM's newest technologies, including HD audio.
