= The Industry Trust for Intellectual Property Awareness =

The Industry Trust for Intellectual Property Awareness was set up by the UK video industry in 2004 and was joined by retailers, film and TV industry to help promote the role of copyright in the creation of film and television content.

The Industry Trust is funded by more than 30 member organisations from across the film and television sectors, ranging from film studios to retail outlets.

By communicating the role of copyright in protecting creative works and the 150,000+ people in the UK film and television industry whose jobs are supported by it or directly depend on it, the Industry Trust aims to "demonstrate the value in choosing legal downloads and DVDs over unauthorised content".

== Recent campaigns ==
=== You Make The Movies ===
In April 2009, the Industry Trust launched a new film trailer campaign called 'You Make The Movies'. This thanked the British public for supporting the film and television industry by buying cinema tickets, genuine DVDs and authorised downloads. The series of three trailers acknowledged the role the public plays in helping to fund future film production. The new trailers form part of an ongoing campaign by the Industry Trust which has helped double the amount of UK consumers who think unofficial downloads and file-sharing are wrong in the last two years (NOP 07-08).
