= When the Going Gets Tough, the Tough Get Going (album) =

Studio album by Bow Wow Wow
- Released: 1983
- Studio: Basing Street, London
- Genre: New wave
- Length: 35:21
- Label: RCA Victor
- Producer: Mike Chapman

Bow Wow Wow chronology
Original Recordings (1982)	When the Going Gets Tough, the Tough Get Going (1983)	The Best of Bow Wow Wow (1989)

Singles from When the Going Gets Tough, the Tough Get Going
- 1. "Do You Wanna Hold Me?" Released: 1983; 2. "The Mountain Man" Released: 1983 (Netherlands-only release); 3. "Love, Peace and Harmony" Released: 1983 (US-only release); 4. "Mario (Your Own Way to Paradise)" Released: 1983 (Netherlands-only release)

When the Going Gets Tough, the Tough Get Going is the second studio album by English new wave band Bow Wow Wow, released in 1983 by RCA Records. The album was produced by Mike Chapman. It is the final album featuring all four original members of the band.

The cover photography was by David Bailey, and the album credits gave "a kiss" to James Honeyman-Scott and John Belushi, both of whom had recently died.

On 25 May 2018, Cherry Red Records released the three-disc set Your Box Set Pet (The Complete Recordings 1980–1984), which included When the Going Gets Tough, the Tough Get Going in its entirety on the second disc, plus eight bonus tracks.

== Reception ==
Professional ratings
Review scores
Source	Rating
AllMusic	3.5/5 stars
Record Mirror	5/5 stars
The Rolling Stone Album Guide	1/5 stars
Smash Hits	8/10
The Village Voice	C+

Kimberley Leston of Smash Hits commented that When the Going Gets Tough, the Tough Get Going finds Bow Wow Wow playing "with even more haughty panache than usual." Record Mirror's John Shearlaw praised the album as "a jolly, carefree and totally meaningless half hour" that "doesn't pretend to be anything other than completely disposable." Robert Christgau was more critical in The Village Voice, saying that "Mike Chapman adds few if any hooks and Annabella Lwin shockingly little verve to their pattering Afrobeats."

In a retrospective review, Tom Demalon of AllMusic called the album "a well-polished, well-executed effort that holds some surprises mainly in the fact that there is more diversity than on prior Bow Wow Wow records." By contrast, J. D. Considine dismissed it as "slick" and "empty" in The Rolling Stone Album Guide.

== Track listing ==
All tracks are written by Matthew Ashman, David Barbarossa, Leigh Gorman and Annabella Lwin

Side one
No.	Title	Length
1.	"Aphrodisiac"	2:58
2.	"Do You Wanna Hold Me?"	3:14
3.	"Roustabout"	2:20
4.	"Lonesome Tonight"	2:47
5.	"Love Me"	3:28
6.	"What's the Time (Hey Buddy)"	3:06

Side two
No.	Title	Length
1.	"Mario (Your Own Way to Paradise)"	2:54
2.	"Quiver (Arrows in My)"	3:14
3.	"The Man Mountain"	2:26
4.	"Rikki Dee"	3:02
5.	"Tommy Tucker"	2:44
6.	"Love, Peace and Harmony"	2:50
Total length:		35:21

== Charts ==
Chart (1983)	Peak position
Dutch Albums (Album Top 100)	24
Swedish Albums (Sverigetopplistan)	24
US Billboard 200	83
