= C·30 C·60 C·90 Go =

"C·30 C·60 C·90 Go!"
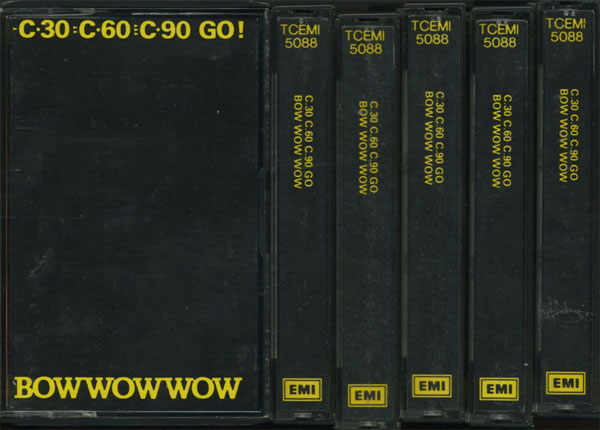

Single by Bow Wow Wow
- B-side: "Sun Sea and Piracy"
- Released: July 1980
- Genre: New wave
- Length: 3:02
- Label: EMI
- Songwriters: Dave Barbarossa; Leigh Gorman; Matthew Ashman; Malcolm McLaren
- Producer: Malcolm McLaren

Bow Wow Wow singles chronology
"C·30 C·60 C·90 Go!" (1980)	"W.O.R.K. (N.O. Nah NO! NO! My Daddy Don't)" (1981)

"C·30 C·60 C·90 Go" is the debut single by English new wave band Bow Wow Wow. It was written by Malcolm McLaren, Matthew Ashman, Leigh Gorman and Dave Barbarossa. Originally only released on cassette, it was the first cassette single released.

== Background ==
After recording Dirk Wears White Sox as members of Adam and the Ants, Ashman, Gorman and Barbarossa were convinced by former Sex Pistols manager McLaren to leave Adam Ant to form Bow Wow Wow under his management. Liverpool session musician, music director, and talent scout Dave Fishel heard Annabella Lwin singing along to the radio at the dry cleaners in West Hampstead where she worked and convinced McLaren to audition her for the band. They signed with EMI Records in July 1980 and released "C·30 C·60 C·90 Go" shortly afterward.

== Release ==
The single was originally released solely on cassette. EMI refused to promote the single due to lyrics ("Off the radio I get constant flow/Hit it, pause it, record and play/Turn it, rewind and rub it away") that promoted home taping during an era when music piracy was a hot-button issue. The B-side, "Sun, Sea and Piracy", was also on side 1 of the tape, making the second side blank, presumably so the listener could follow Lwin's lead.

After several weeks, it was also issued as a vinyl 7" single, reaching No. 34 on the UK Singles Chart and staying on the chart for seven weeks. The song was ranked among the top 10 "Tracks of the Year" for 1980 by NME, as was their cassette-only debut mini-album Your Cassette Pet. Your Cassette Pet contained only eight tracks, and was not available on vinyl, making it only eligible for the singles chart, and not the UK Albums Chart.

== B-side ==
"Sun, Sea and Piracy" was also written by McLaren, Ashman, Gorman and Barbarossa. It too promoted home taping, then lying on a beach and enjoying the fruits of this labour. "C·30 C·60 C·90 Go" itself became a B-side when the Spanish version, "C·30 C·60 C·90 Anda", was used as the B-side to their follow-up single, "W.O.R.K (N.O. Nah No! No! My Daddy Don't)".

== In popular culture ==
The song was featured in Ari Gold's 2008 film Adventures of Power.
