= When the going gets tough, the tough get going =

Popular American witticism

"When the going gets tough, the tough get going" is a popular phrase of witticism in American English.

The phrase is an example of an antimetabole.

The origin of the phrase has been attributed to various sources. It appeared to come from American football parlance, with the earliest published sources in the 1950s, including an article in the Corpus Christi Times quoting local football coach John Thomas in 1953, and from a 1954 article in the Santa Cruz Sentinel-News quoting coach Francis William Leahy.

In the early 21st century, the phrase is used as a form of management motivational talk, and is popular in many self-help books.
