= Motion Picture Association =

American trade organization

- Logo since 2019
- Abbreviation: MPA
- Formation: 1922; 104 years ago
- Type: Non-profit corporation
- Tax ID no.: 13-1068220
- Legal status: 501(c)(6)
- Headquarters: Washington, D.C., U.S.
- Location: Worldwide
- Products: Film ratings, lobbying, anti-piracy, self-regulatory
- Members: Amazon MGM Studios and Amazon Prime Video; Netflix; Skydance; Sony Pictures; Universal Pictures; Walt Disney Studios
- Chairman and CEO: Charles Rivkin
- Website: motionpictures.org
- Formerly called: Motion Picture Producers and Distributors of America (1922–1945); Motion Picture Association of America (1945–2019)

The Motion Picture Association (MPA) is an American trade association representing the major film studios of the United States, the mini-major Amazon MGM Studios, as well as the video streaming services Netflix and Amazon Prime Video. Founded in 1922 as the Motion Picture Producers and Distributors of America (MPPDA) and known as the Motion Picture Association of America (MPAA) from 1945 until September 2019, its original goal was to ensure the viability of the American film industry. In addition, the MPA established guidelines for film content which resulted in the creation of the Motion Picture Production Code in 1930. This code, also known as the Hays Code, was replaced by a voluntary film rating system in 1968, which is managed by the Classification and Rating Administration (CARA).

The MPA has lobbied for the motion picture and television industry, with the goals of promoting effective copyright protection, expanding market access and has worked to curb copyright infringement, including attempts to limit the sharing of copyrighted works via peer-to-peer file sharing networks and by streaming from pirate sites. Former United States ambassador to France Charles Rivkin is the chairman and CEO.

== History ==
=== Foundation and early history: 1922–1929 ===
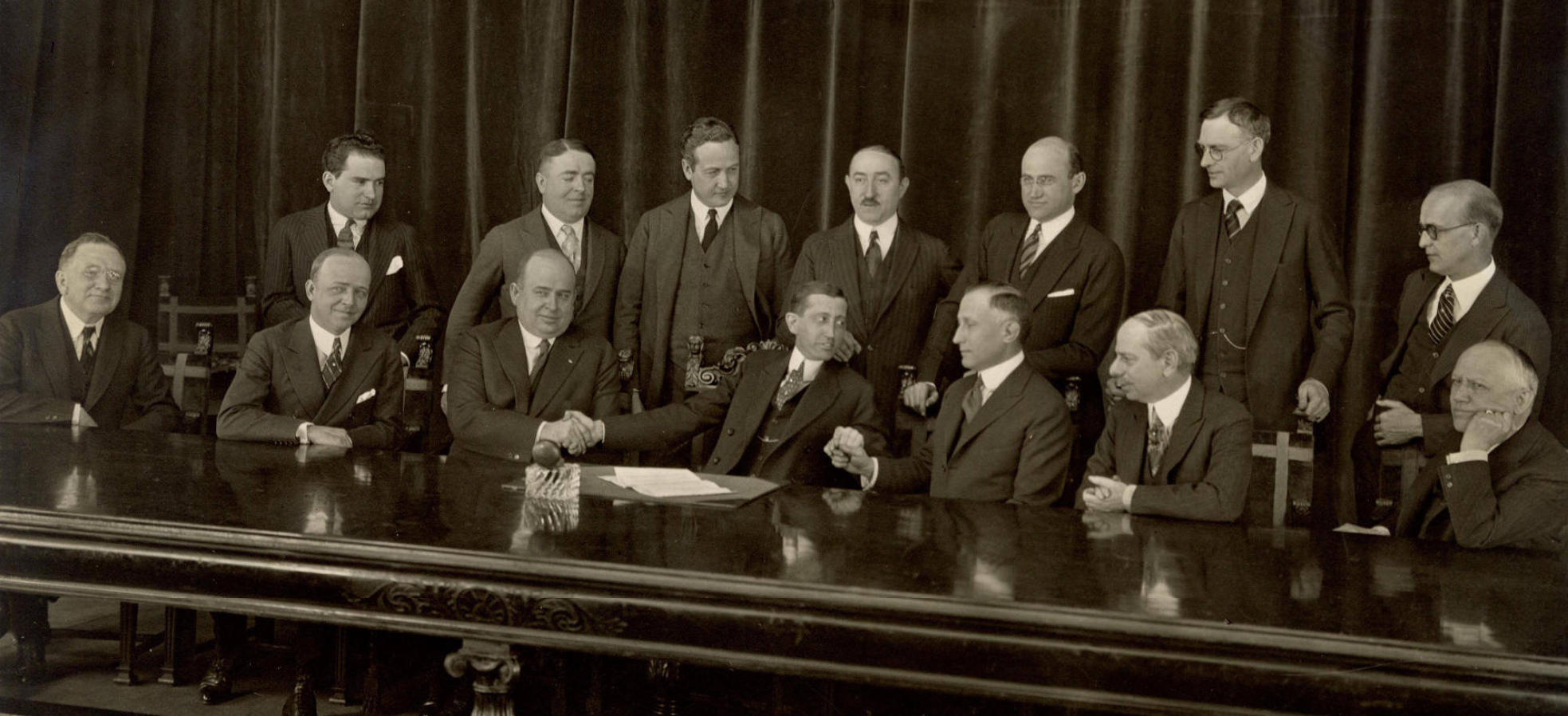
First meeting of the MPPDA on March 10, 1922.

The MPA was founded as the Motion Picture Producers and Distributors of America (MPPDA) in 1922 as a trade association of member motion picture companies. At its founding, MPPDA member companies produced approximately 70 to 80 percent of the films made in the United States. Former postmaster general Will H. Hays was named the association's first president.

The main focus of the MPPDA in its early years was on producing a strong public relations campaign to ensure that Hollywood remained financially stable and able to attract investment from Wall Street, while simultaneously ensuring that American films had a "clean moral tone". The MPPDA also instituted a code of conduct for Hollywood's actors in an attempt to govern their behavior offscreen. Finally, the code sought to protect American film interests abroad by encouraging film studios to avoid racist portrayals of foreigners.

From the early days of the association, Hays spoke out against public censorship, and the MPPDA worked to raise support from the general public for the film industry's efforts against such censorship. Large portions of the public opposed censorship, but also decried the lack of morals in movies. The organisation also had formed a trust to block out Independents and enforce the monopolistic studio system.

At the time of the MPPDA's founding, there was no national censorship, but some state and municipal laws required movies to be censored, a process usually overseen by a local censorship board. As such, in certain locations in the U.S., films were often edited to comply with local laws regarding the onscreen portrayal of violence and sexuality, among other topics. This resulted in negative publicity for the studios and decreasing numbers of theater goers, who were uninterested in films that were sometimes so severely edited that they were incoherent. In 1929, more than 50 percent of American moviegoers lived in a location overseen by such a board.

In 1924, Hays instituted "The Formula", a loose set of guidelines for filmmakers, in an effort to get the movie industry to self-regulate the issues that the censorship boards had been created to address. "The Formula" requested that studios send synopses of films being considered to the MPPDA for review. This effort largely failed, however, as studios were under no obligation to send their scripts to Hays's office, nor to follow his recommendations.

In 1927, Hays oversaw the creation of a code of "Don'ts and Be Carefuls" for the industry. This list outlined the issues that movies could encounter in different localities. Hays also created a Studio Relations Department (SRD) with staff available to the studios for script reviews and advice regarding potential problems. Again, despite Hays' efforts, studios largely ignored the "Don'ts and Be Carefuls", and by the end of 1929, the MPPDA received only about 20 percent of Hollywood scripts prior to production, and the number of regional and local censorship boards continued to increase.

=== Production Code: 1930–1934 ===
In 1930, the MPPDA introduced the Motion Picture Production Code, commonly called the Hays Code. The Code consisted of moral guidelines regarding what was acceptable to include in films. Unlike the "Don'ts and Be Carefuls", which the studios had ignored, the Production Code was endorsed by studio executives. The Code incorporated many of the "Don'ts and Be Carefuls" as specific examples of what could not be portrayed. Among other rules, the code prohibited inclusion of "scenes of passion" unless they were essential to a film's plot; "pointed profanity" in either word or action; "sex perversion"; justification or explicit coverage of adultery; sympathetic treatment of crime or criminals; dancing with "indecent" moves; and "white slavery" (prostitution). Because studio executives had been involved in the decision to adopt the code, MPPDA-member studios were more willing to submit scripts for consideration. However, the growing economic impacts of the Great Depression of the early 1930s increased pressure on studios to make films that would draw the largest possible audiences, even if it meant taking their chances with local censorship boards by disobeying the Code.

In 1933 and 1934, the Catholic Legion of Decency, along with a number of Protestant and women's groups, launched plans to boycott films that they deemed immoral. In order to avert boycotts which might further harm the profitability of the film industry, the MPPDA created a new department, the Production Code Administration (PCA), with Joseph Breen as its head. Unlike previous attempts at self-censorship, PCA decisions were binding—no film could be exhibited in an American theater without a stamp of approval from the PCA, and any producer attempting to do so faced a fine of $25,000. After ten years of unsuccessful voluntary codes and expanding local censorship boards, the studio approved and agreed to enforce the codes, and the nationwide "Production Code" was enforced starting on July 1, 1934.

=== War years: 1934–1945 ===
In the years that immediately followed the adoption of the Code, Breen often sent films back to Hollywood for additional edits, and in some cases, simply refused to issue PCA approval for a film to be shown. At the same time, Hays promoted the industry's new focus on wholesome films and continued promoting American films abroad.

For nearly three years, studios complied with the Code. By 1938, however, as the threat of war in Europe loomed, movie producers began to worry about the possibility of decreased profits abroad. This led to a decreased investment in following the strictures of the code, and occasional refusals to comply with PCA demands. That same year, responding to trends in European films in the run-up to the war, Hays spoke out against using movies as a vehicle for propaganda. In 1945, after nearly 24 years as president, Hays stepped down from his position at the MPPDA, although he continued to act as an advisor for the Association for the next five years.

=== Johnston era: 1945–1963 ===
In 1945 the MPPDA hired Eric Johnston, four-time president of the United States Chamber of Commerce, to replace Hays. During his first year as president, Johnston rebranded the Motion Picture Producers and Distributors of America as the Motion Picture Association of America (MPAA).

He also created the Motion Picture Export Association (MPEA) to promote American films abroad by opposing production company monopolies in other countries. In 1947 the MPEA voted to discontinue film shipments to Britain after the British government imposed an import tax on American films. Johnston negotiated with the British government to end the tax in 1948, and film shipments resumed.

In 1956, Johnston oversaw the first major revision of the Production Code since it was created in 1930. This revision allowed the treatment of some subjects which had previously been forbidden, including abortion and the use of narcotics, so long as they were "within the limits of good taste". At the same time, the revisions added a number of new restrictions to the code, including outlawing the depiction of blasphemy and mercy killings in films.

Johnston was well-liked by studio executives, and his political connections helped him function as an effective liaison between Hollywood and Washington. In 1963, while still serving as president of the MPAA, Johnston died of a stroke. For three years, the MPAA operated without a president while studio executives searched for a replacement.

=== Valenti era: 1966–2004 ===
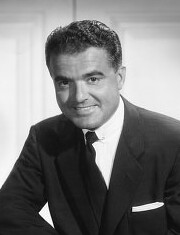
Jack Valenti was the president of Motion Picture Association of America for 38 years.

The MPAA appointed Jack Valenti, former aide to President Lyndon Johnson, as president of the MPAA in 1966. In 1968, Valenti replaced the Production Code with a system of voluntary film ratings, in order to limit censorship of Hollywood films and provide parents with information about the appropriateness of films for children. In addition to concerns about protecting children, Valenti stated in his autobiography that he sought to ensure that American filmmakers could produce the films they wanted, without the censorship that existed under the Production Code that had been in effect since 1934.

In 1975, Valenti established the Film Security Office, an anti-piracy division at the MPAA, which sought to recover unauthorized recordings of films to prevent duplication. Valenti continued to fight piracy into the 1980s, asking Congress to install chips in VCRs that would prevent illegal reproduction of video cassettes, and in the 1990s supported law enforcement efforts to stop bootleg distribution of video tapes. Valenti also oversaw a major change in the ratings system that he had helped create—the removal of the "X" rating, which had come to be closely associated with pornography. It was replaced with a new rating, "NC-17", in 1990.

In 1994, the Motion Picture Export Association of America changed its name to the Motion Picture Association to more accurately reflect the global nature of audiovisual entertainment in today's international marketplace.

In 2001, Valenti established the Digital Strategy Department at the MPAA to specifically address issues surrounding digital film distribution and piracy.

=== Modern era: 2004–present ===
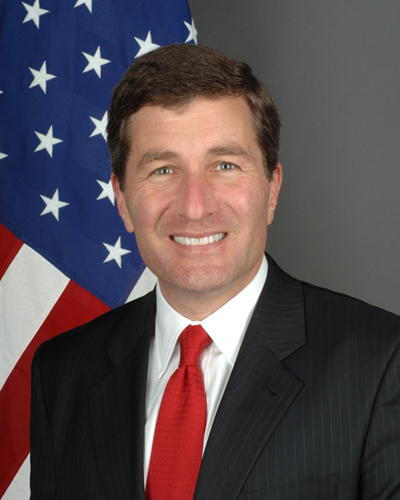
Former U.S. Ambassador to France and Assistant Secretary of State Charles Rivkin became the chairman and CEO of the MPAA in 2017

After serving as president of the MPAA for 38 years, Valenti announced that he would step down in 2004. In September of that year, he was replaced by former Secretary of Agriculture Dan Glickman. During his tenure, Glickman focused on tax issues, content protection efforts, and increasing U.S. studios' access to international markets. He led lobbying efforts that resulted in $400 million in federal tax incentives for the film industry, and also supported a law which created federal oversight of anti-piracy efforts. Glickman stepped down in 2010.

After a search which lasted over a year, the MPAA hired former U.S. Senator Chris Dodd to replace Glickman in March 2011. In his role as president, Dodd focused on content protection, trade, and improving Hollywood's image. He traveled to China in 2011 in an effort to encourage the Chinese government to both crack down on piracy and further open its film market. A settlement of a long-argued World Trade Organization complaint, coupled with Dodd's efforts, contributed to the United States' agreement with China in 2012 to open China's film market to more Hollywood films and to increase U.S. studios' share of box-office revenues in China. In addition to this agreement with China, the U.S. signed more than 20 memos of understanding with foreign governments regarding the enforcement of intellectual property rights during Dodd's tenure at the MPAA.

In 2011, the MPAA supported the passage of the Stop Online Piracy Act (SOPA) and PROTECT IP Act (PIPA). After the two bills were shelved in early 2012, Dodd indicated that Hollywood might cut off campaign contributions to politicians who failed to support anti-piracy efforts in the future.

In 2012, the MPAA launched the Diversity and Multicultural Outreach program, as part of an effort to increase diversity in the television and film industry both through employment and representation on screen. Since its inception, the Diversity and Multicultural and Outreach group has conducted outreach and partnered with more than 20 multicultural groups and national civil rights organizations in sponsoring film screenings, festivals, and other diversity-themed events.

Throughout his tenure at the MPAA, Dodd also highlighted the need for film studios to embrace technology as a means of distributing content.

In June 2017, the MPAA supported the launch of the Alliance for Creativity and Entertainment (ACE), a coalition of entertainment companies, including the six major studios, Netflix and Amazon, that would draw on the MPAA's resources in an effort to reduce online piracy through research and legal efforts.

Former U.S. diplomat and Assistant Secretary of State for Economic and Business Affairs Charles Rivkin succeeded Chris Dodd as CEO on September 5, 2017, and as chairman effective December 6, 2017. On January 25, 2019, film streaming service Netflix announced that it had joined the MPAA in an effort to identify itself among the major studios.

In September 2019, the association updated its branding to reflect the global nature of the film, television, and streaming industry, officially changing its name to the Motion Picture Association (MPA), a name which it has used internationally since 1994. An updated logo also went into effect at this time.

In September 2024, it was announced Amazon MGM Studios would join the MPA, making the seventh member in the entertainment policy group.

== Film rating system ==
In 1968, the MPAA established the Code and Rating Administration, or CARA (later renamed the Classification and Rating Administration), which began issuing ratings for films exhibited and distributed commercially in the United States to help parents determine what films are appropriate for their children.

Since the rating system was first introduced in November 1968, it has gone through several changes, including the addition of a PG-13 rating. The ratings system is completely voluntary, and ratings have no legal standing. Instead, the American film industry enforces the MPAA film ratings after they have been assigned, with many theaters refusing to exhibit non-rated films. For example, it is against the American film industry's policy to admit unaccompanied children to an R-rated film. An unrated film is often denoted by "NR", such as in newspapers, although this is not a formal MPAA rating.

In 2006, the film This Film Is Not Yet Rated alleged that the MPAA gave preferential treatment to member studios during the process of assigning ratings, as well as criticizing the rating process for its lack of transparency. In response, the MPAA posted its ratings rules, policies, and procedures, as well as its appeals process, online. According to the MPA, the ratings are made by an independent group of parents.

According to a 2015 study commissioned by CARA, ninety-three percent of parents in the U.S. find the rating system to be a helpful tool.

The ratings currently used by the MPA's voluntary system are:

| Rating block/symbol | Meaning | MPA's explanation |
|---|---|---|
| G rating symbol and block | G – General Audiences | "Nothing that would offend parents for viewing by children." On the box: "All ages admitted" |
| PG- rating symbol and block | PG – Parental Guidance Suggested | "Parents urged to give 'parental guidance.' May contain some material parents might not like for their young children." On the box: "Some material may not be suitable for children" |
| PG-13 rating symbol and block | PG-13 – Parents Strongly Cautioned | "Parents are urged to be cautious. Some material may be inappropriate for pre-teenagers." On the box: "Some material may be inappropriate for children under 13" |
| R rating symbol and block | R – Restricted | "Contains some adult material. Parents are urged to learn more about the film before taking their young children with them." On the box: "Under 17 requires accompanying parent or adult guardian" |
| NC-17 rating symbol and block | NC-17 – Adults Only | "Clearly adult. Children are not admitted." On the box: "No One 17 and Under Admitted" |

== Members ==
| Current members | Year of induction |
|---|---|
| Universal Pictures | 1922 |
| Walt Disney Studios | 1979 |
| Sony Pictures | 1989 |
| Netflix | 2019 |
| Amazon MGM Studios and Amazon Prime Video | 2024 |
| Skydance | 2026 |

The original MPAA members were the "Big Eight" film studios: Paramount Pictures, Fox Film, Loews, Universal Pictures, and United Artists, followed by Warner Bros. in 1923, Columbia Pictures in 1924, along with Metro-Goldwyn-Mayer (formed by the merger of Loews, Metro Pictures, Goldwyn Pictures, and Louis B. Mayer Productions), and RKO Pictures in 1928. Next, there was the 1935 merger of Fox Film and 20th Century Pictures, which became 20th Century Fox.

United Artists briefly resigned from the organization in 1956 when the film The Man With the Golden Arm was denied a Production Code seal. United Artists rejoined the organization in June 1957. In 1960, 20th Century Fox served a notice of resignation from the organization, which was made effective a year later.

In 1963, Walt Disney Productions resigned from the organization, with the studio president Roy O. Disney stating their interests "often do not seem to parallel those of other M.P.A.A. member companies." By 1966, Allied Artists Pictures had joined the original members. In the following decade, Avco Embassy became a new member in 1975 and Walt Disney Productions rejoined the organization in 1979. The next year, Filmways became a MPAA member, but was later replaced in 1986 along with Avco Embassy when the De Laurentiis Entertainment Group and Orion Pictures joined the MPAA roster.

As of 1995, the MPAA members were MGM—which included United Artists after their 1981 merger, Paramount, Sony Pictures—which included Columbia and TriStar Pictures after their 1989 acquisition, 20th Century Fox, Universal, Disney, and Warner Bros. Turner Entertainment joined the MPAA in 1995, but was purchased in 1996 by Time Warner. The number of members dropped to six in 2005, following Sony's failed attempt to acquire MGM. The MPAA's member companies remained intact until the 2019 acquisition of 21st Century Fox by Disney, including 20th Century Fox.

Netflix was approved as a new member in January 2019, making it the first non-studio and the first streaming service to be part of the organization. The addition of Netflix also helped to maintain the number of members after the acquisition of 20th Century Fox by Disney. The MPA aims to recruit additional members.

In September 2024, it was announced that Amazon MGM Studios and Prime Video would join the MPA as its seventh member starting October 1, the second non-studio to do so after Netflix in 2019; this would also mark a return to the MPA for MGM, currently a division of Amazon MGM Studios, after it lost membership in 2005 following a buyout led by Sony.

Following the merger of Skydance Media and Paramount Global in 2025, the newly formed Paramount Skydance completed a merger with Warner Bros. Discovery, which reduced the MPA's roster back to six members as the combined entity's representation was consolidated solely under the Skydance banner, removing both Warner Bros. and Paramount as standalone member listings.

== Content protection efforts ==
The MPA's concerted efforts at fighting copyright infringement began in 1975 with the establishment of the Film Security Office, which sought to recover unauthorized recordings of films in order to prevent duplication. The MPA has continued to pursue a number of initiatives to combat illegal distribution of films and TV shows, especially in response to new technologies. In the 1980s, it spoke out against VCRs and the threat that the MPA believed they represented to the movie industry, with MPAA president Jack Valenti drawing a parallel between the threat of the VCR and that of the Boston Strangler. In 1986, the MPAA asked Congress to pass a law that would require VCRs to come equipped with a chip to prevent them from making copies. Legal efforts at stopping homemade copies of broadcast television largely ended, however, when the United States Supreme Court ruled that such copying constituted fair use.

The MPA continued to support law enforcement efforts to stop bootleg production and distribution of videotapes and laserdiscs into the 1990s, and in 2000 took successful legal action against individuals posting DVD decryption software on the Internet in Universal City Studios, Inc. v. Reimerdes. Following the release of RealDVD—an application that enabled users to make copies of DVDs—RealNetworks sued the DVD Copy Control Association and the major studios in 2008 over the legality of the software, accusing them of violating the Sherman Antitrust Act. The judgment found there were no grounds for the antitrust claim and dismissed the suit. The court later found that the RealNetworks product violated the Digital Millennium Copyright Act (DMCA).

The MPA has continued to support law enforcement efforts to prevent illegal distribution of copyrighted materials online. The MPA and its British counterpart, the Federation Against Copyright Theft (FACT), also funded the training of Lucky and Flo, a pair of Labrador Retrievers, to detect polycarbonates used in the manufacturing of DVDs.

The MPA strives to protect the creative rights of the large corporate film makers. Its counterpart has come up with infamous slogans such as "Who Makes Movies?" and "You can click, but you can't hide".

=== Online file sharing ===
In the early 2000s, the MPAA began focusing its efforts to curb copyright infringement specifically on peer-to-peer file sharing, initially using a combination of educational campaigns and cease and desist letters to discourage such activity. In the first six months of 2002, the MPAA sent more than 18,000 such letters to internet service providers to forward to users engaged in copyright infringement.

In late 2004, the MPAA changed course and filed lawsuits in a concerted effort to address copyright infringement on a number of large online file-sharing services, including BitTorrent and eDonkey. The following year, the MPAA expanded its legal actions to include lawsuits against individuals who downloaded and distributed copyrighted material via peer-to-peer networks.

The MPAA also played a role in encouraging the Swedish government to conduct a raid of the Pirate Bay file-sharing website in May 2006. Swedish officials have acknowledged that part of the motivation for the raid was the threat of sanctions from the World Trade Organization, along with a letter from the MPAA.

In 2013, the Center for Copyright Information unveiled the Copyright Alert System, a system established through an agreement between the MPAA, the Recording Industry Association of America, and five of the US's largest internet service providers. The system used a third-party service to identify content being distributed illegally. Users were then informed that their accounts were being used for possible copyright infringement and were provided with information about ways to get authorized content online. Users who received multiple notices of infringement faced "mitigations measures", such as temporary slowing of their Internet service, but the system did not include termination of subscriber accounts. Subscribers facing such action had a right to appeal to the American Arbitration Association. In January 2017, the Copyright Alert System was discontinued. While no official reason was given, the MPAA's general counsel stated that the system had not been equipped to stop repeat infringers.

On December 24, 2014, the Sony Pictures hack revealed that following a lawsuit in which the MPAA won a multimillion judgment against Hotfile, a file hosting website, the MPAA colluded with Hotfile to misrepresent the settlement so that the case would serve as a deterrent. The settlement was previously believed to be $80 million and was widely reported; however, Hotfile only paid the studios $4 million and agreed to have the $80 million figure recorded as the judgment and the website shut down.

In a case resolved in 2015, the MPAA and others supported the United States International Trade Commission (ITC)'s decision to consider electronic transmissions to the U.S. as "articles" so that it could prevent the importation of digital files of counterfeit goods. While the case being considered by the ITC involved dental appliances, the ITC could have also used such authority to bar the importation of pirated movies and TV shows from rogue foreign websites that traffic in infringing content. The Federal Circuit Court of Appeals took up the matter, and ultimately ruled against the ITC.

In 2016, the MPAA reported Putlocker as one of the "top 5 rogue cyberlocker services" to the Office of the United States Trade Representative as a major piracy threat; the website was then blocked in the United Kingdom.

In 2019, the MPA released an overview of the piracy markets in contravention of the US Government. Added to the list were Chinese hosting service Baidu, and Russian gambling firm 1xBet.

== MPA Awards ==
The annual MPA Awards are presented to influential individuals across creative, policy, and content protection communities who play a role in strengthening and safeguarding the film, television, and streaming industry. The awards were created in 2022 by the Motion Picture Association.

The MPA presents different categories of awards each year:

- The MPA Creator Award is presented annually to an individual whose craft behind the camera has shaped culture and helped audiences see the world in new and different ways.
- The MPA Industry Champion Award is given to individuals who have promoted the growth of the creative economy by advancing dynamic policies that generate new opportunities for all creators.
- New in 2024, the MPA Creative Protector Award honors an institution or individual that has demonstrated a commitment to safeguarding creativity through effective anti-piracy and other enforcement actions.
- The MPA Lifetime Achievement Award recognizes those with unwavering commitment to the industry throughout their career.

=== Award recipients ===
MPA America250 Award

| Year | Award | Recipient |
|---|---|---|
| 2026 | MPA America250 Award | Steven Spielberg |

MPA Creator Award

| Year | Award | Recipient |
|---|---|---|
| 2022 | MPA Creator Award | Nikyatu Jusu |
| 2023 | MPA Creator Award | Gina Prince-Bythewood |
| 2024 | MPA Creator Award | J.A. Bayona |
| 2025 | MPA Creator Award | Jon M. Chu |
| 2026 | MPA Creator Award | Francis Lawrence |

MPA Industry Champion Award

| Year | Award | Recipient |
|---|---|---|
| 2022 | MPA Industry Champion Award | NJ Governor Phil Murphy |
| 2022 | MPA Industry Champion Award | U.S. Senator Thom Tillis (NC) |
| 2023 | MPA Industry Champion Award | U.S. Representative Hakeem Jeffries (NY) |
| 2023 | MPA Industry Champion Award | Mexico City Governor Claudia Sheinbaum |
| 2024 | MPA Industry Champion Award | Nadia Calviño |
| 2025 | MPA Industry Champion Award | U.S. Senate Majority Leader John Thune (SD) |
| 2025 | MPA Industry Champion Award | U.S. Senator Chris Coons (DE) |
| 2025 | MPA Industry Champion Award | U.S. Representative Darrell Issa (CA) |
| 2026 | MPA Industry Champion Award | U.S. Senator Reverend Raphael Warnock (GA) |
| 2026 | MPA Industry Champion Award | Kentucky Senate President Robert Stivers |

MPA Creative Protector Award

| Year | Award | Recipient |
|---|---|---|
| 2024 | MPA Creative Protector Award | Spanish National Police |
| 2025 | MPA Creative Protector Award | National Intellectual Property Rights Coordination Center |
| 2026 | MPA Creative Protector Award | Egyptian Ministry of Interior |

MPA Lifetime Achievement Award

| Year | Award | Recipient |
|---|---|---|
| 2022 | MPA Lifetime Achievement Award | U.S. Senator Patrick Leahy (VT) |

== Criticism and controversies ==
=== Publicity campaigns ===
The MPAA has also produced publicity campaigns to discourage piracy. The Who Makes Movies? advertising campaign in 2003 highlighted workers in the film industry describing how piracy affected them. The video spots ran as trailers before films, and as television advertisements. In 2004, the MPAA began using the slogan "You can click, but you can't hide". This slogan appeared in messages that replaced file-sharing websites after they had been shut down through MPAA legal action. It also appeared in posters and videos distributed to video stores by the MPAA. Also in 2004, the MPAA partnered with the Federation Against Copyright Theft and the Intellectual Property Office of Singapore to release "You Wouldn’t Steal A Car", a trailer that was shown before films in theaters equating piracy with car theft. The trailer was later placed at the beginning of the video on many DVDs in many cases as an unskippable clip (not being able to skip or fast-forward), which triggered criticism and a number of parodies.

In 2005, the MPAA commissioned a study to examine the effects of file sharing on film industry profitability. The study concluded that the industry lost $6.1 billion per year to piracy, and that up to 44 percent of domestic losses were due to file sharing by college students. In 2008, the MPAA revised the percentage of loss due to college students down to 15 percent, citing human error in the initial calculations of this figure. Beyond the percentage of the loss that was attributable to college students, however, no other errors were found in the study.

In 2015, theaters began airing the MPAA's "I Make Movies" series, an ad campaign intended to combat piracy by highlighting the stories of behind-the-scenes employees in the film and television industry. The series pointed audiences to the MPAA's "WhereToWatch" website (later dubbed "The Credits") which provides attention to the behind-the-scenes creativity involved in filmmaking.

=== Accusations of copyright infringement ===
The MPAA has been accused of copyright infringement on multiple occasions. In 2007, the creator of a blogging platform named Forest Blog accused the MPAA of violating the license for the platform, which required that users link back to the Forest Blog website. The MPAA had used the platform for its own blog, but without linking back to the Forest Blog website. The MPAA subsequently took the blog offline, and explained that the software had been used as a test, and the blog never publicized.

Also in 2007, the MPAA released a software toolkit for universities to help identify cases of file sharing on campus. The software used parts of the Ubuntu Linux distribution, released under the GNU General Public License, which stipulates that the source code of any projects using the distribution be made available to third parties. The source code for the MPAA's toolkit, however, was not made available. When the MPAA was made aware of the violation, the software toolkit was removed from their website.

In 2006, the MPAA admitted having made illegal copies of This Film Is Not Yet Rated (a documentary exploring the MPAA, and history of its rating system) — an act which Ars Technica explicitly described as hypocrisy and which Roger Ebert called "rich irony". The MPAA subsequently claimed that it had the legal right to copy the film despite this being counter to the filmmaker's explicit request, because the documentary's exploration of the MPAA's ratings board was potentially a violation of the board members' privacy.

== International activities ==
Around the world, the MPA helps with local law enforcement to combat piracy.

The MPA offices in the world are:

- Motion Picture Association – Canada
- MPA EMEA, which has anti-piracy programs in 17 European countries
- MPA Asia-Pacific, which has anti-piracy programs in 14 Asian countries
- MPA Latin America, which has anti-piracy programs in two Latin-American countries

== See also ==
- Australian Classification Board
- British Board of Film Classification
- DeCSS: decryption program for DVD video discs using Content Scramble System
- Eirin
- Entertainment Software Rating Board
- Will H. Hays
- National Association of Theatre Owners
- Operation Red Card
- Pre-Code Hollywood
- United States Motion Picture Production Code of 1930
