= Sony Corp. of America v. Universal City Studios, Inc. =

- Supreme Court of the United States

Argued January 18, 1983 Reargued October 3, 1983 Decided January 17, 1984
- Full case name: Sony Corporation of America et al. v. Universal City Studios, Inc., et al.
- Citations: 464 U.S. 417 (more) 104 S. Ct. 774; 78 L. Ed. 2d 574; 1984 U.S. LEXIS 19; 52 U.S.L.W. 4090; 220 U.S.P.Q. (BNA) 665; 224 U.S.P.Q. (BNA) 736; 55 Rad. Reg. 2d (P & F) 156
- Argument: Oral argument

Case history
- Prior: Unfair competition claims dismissed, 429 F. Supp. 407 (C.D. Cal. 1977); judgment for defendants, 480 F. Supp. 429 (C.D. Cal. 1979); affirmed in part, reversed in part and remanded, 659 F.2d 963 (9th Cir. 1981); rehearing denied, 9th Circuit, 1982; cert. granted, 457 U.S. 1116 (1982); reargument scheduled, 463 U.S. 1226 (1983).
- Subsequent: Rehearing denied, 465 U.S. 1112 (1984)

Holding
- Manufacturers of home video recording machines could not be liable for contributory copyright infringement for the potential uses by its purchasers, because the devices were sold for legitimate purposes and had substantial non-infringing uses. Personal use of the machines to record broadcast television programs for later viewing constituted fair use.

Court membership
- Chief Justice Warren E. Burger Associate Justices William J. Brennan Jr. · Byron White; Thurgood Marshall · Harry Blackmun; Lewis F. Powell Jr. · William Rehnquist; John P. Stevens · Sandra Day O'Connor

Case opinions
- Majority: Stevens, joined by Burger, Brennan, White, O'Connor
- Dissent: Blackmun, joined by Marshall, Powell, Rehnquist

Laws applied
- 17 U.S.C. § 101 et seq. (Copyright Act of 1976)

Sony Corp. of America v. Universal City Studios, Inc., 464 U.S. 417 (1984), also known as the "Betamax case", is a decision by the Supreme Court of the United States which ruled that the making of individual copies of complete television shows for purposes of time shifting does not constitute copyright infringement, but can instead be defended as fair use. The court also ruled that the manufacturers of home video recording devices, such as Betamax or other VCRs (referred to as VTRs in the case), cannot be liable for contributory infringement. The case was a boon to the home video market, as it created a legal safe harbor for the technology.

The broader legal consequence of the Supreme Court's decision was its establishment of a general test for determining whether a device with copying or recording capabilities ran afoul of copyright law. This test has created some interpretative challenges for courts when applying the precedent to more recent file sharing technologies available for use on home computers and over the Internet.

== Background ==
In the 1970s, Sony developed the Betamax video tape recording format. Universal Studios and Walt Disney Productions were among the entertainment companies who were wary of this development, but were also aware that the U.S. Congress was in the final stages of a major revision of copyright law and would likely be hesitant to undertake any new protections for the film industry. The companies therefore opted to sue Sony and its distributors in the U.S. District Court for the Central District of California in 1976, alleging that because Sony was manufacturing a device that could be used for copyright infringement, the company was thus liable for any infringement committed by purchasers of the device. The complaint additionally included an unfair competition claim under the Lanham Act, but this was dismissed early in the course of the lawsuit.

Two years later, the district court ruled for Sony, on the basis that noncommercial home use recording was considered fair use, and that access to free public information is a First Amendment public interest served by this use. However, this ruling was reversed in part by the Ninth Circuit Court, which held Sony liable for contributory copyright infringement. That court also held that the main purpose of Betamax was copying. The circuit court went on to suggest damages, injunctive relief, and compulsory licenses in lieu of other relief. Sony then appealed to the Supreme Court.

== Supreme Court ruling ==
=== Majority opinion ===
The Supreme Court ruled 5–4 to reverse the Ninth Circuit, ruling in favor of Sony. The ruling was largely focused on whether the technology in question had significant non-infringing uses, and how the plaintiffs were unable to prove otherwise.

On the question of whether Sony could be described as contributing to copyright infringement, the court stated:

The question is thus whether the Betamax is capable of commercially significant noninfringing uses ... one potential use of the Betamax plainly satisfies this standard, however it is understood: private, noncommercial time-shifting in the home. [...] [W]hen one considers the nature of a televised copyrighted audiovisual work ... and that time-shifting merely enables a viewer to see such a work which he had been invited to witness in its entirety free of charge, the fact ... that the entire work is reproduced ... does not have its ordinary effect of militating against a finding of fair use.

Combined with the noncommercial, nonprofit nature of time-shifting, the court concluded that such behavior indeed qualified as fair use.

Children's television personality Mr. Rogers testified in support of the manufacturers of VCRs at the district court, and his comments were taken into consideration for the Supreme Court's decision. The high court stated that Rogers' views were a notable piece of evidence "that many [television] producers are willing to allow private time-shifting to continue" and even quoted his testimony in a footnote.

=== Dissenting opinion ===
Justice Harry Blackmun dissented, joined by Justices Marshall, Powell, and Rehnquist. With regard to the issue of unauthorized time-shifting, Blackmun wrote: "Section 106 of the 1976 [Copyright] Act grants the owner of a copyright a variety of exclusive rights in the copyrighted work, including [...] the right 'to reproduce the copyrighted work in copies or phonorecords.' [...] Although the word 'copies' is in the plural in 107(1), there can be no question that under the Act the making of even a single unauthorized copy is prohibited."

== Subsequent developments ==
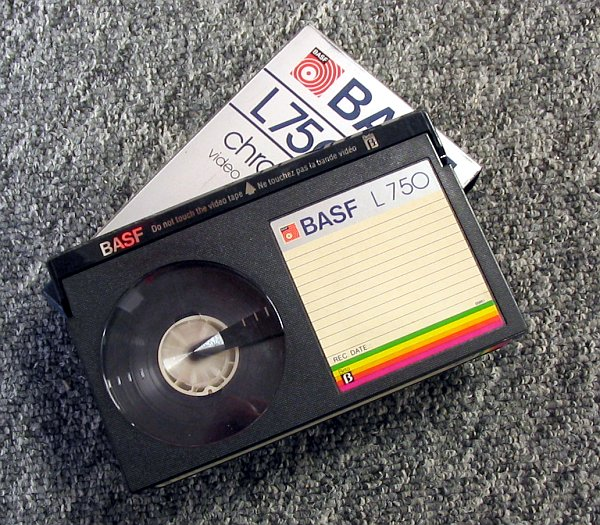
The case centered around Sony's manufacture of the Betamax VCR, which used cassettes like this to store potentially copyrighted information.

Immediately after their loss at the Supreme Court, the entertainment companies lobbied Congress to pass legislation that would protect them from the effects of home copying. However, in the eight years that had passed since the suit was initially filed, the use of home recording devices had become so widespread that Congress was not prepared to take any action detrimental to the significant population of VCR owners. The film industry lobbied Congress to impose a small statutory royalty on the sale of blank videotapes, but Congress would not do so, noting the increased profits for film studios in the home video rental and sales market.

Renting movies every day encourages [people] to go see them when they first come out

— Film producer Jeff Lourie, 1987

Rather than destroying film studios, videotape sales became increasingly important to their revenue. The press discussed the VCR "and the viewing habits it has engendered — the Saturday night trip down to the tape rental store to pick out for a couple of bucks the movie you want to see when you want to see it." Film studios opened new divisions to produce prerecorded tapes, and by 1985 home video sales were about the same as box office revenue. The Associated Press reported that "because of the VCR, even a bad movie can make money." Although the VCR received blame for a 25% decline in the summer 1985 box office compared to 1984's, and was blamed for failing movie theaters, by 1987 it was credited with contributing to a record-high box office season, as videotapes' popularity encouraged consumers' interest in films and watching them in theaters. Cable movie channels worried about VCRs affecting subscriptions, but began to offer more films for owners who wanted to build a home library, even encouraging time shifting by broadcasting the movies during the night so VCRs could record them while their owners slept.

In 1989 Sony purchased Columbia Pictures and became the owner of its own Hollywood studio. By 1995 more than half of Hollywood's American revenue came from home video compared to less than a quarter from movie theaters. Forbes wrote in 2001 that the VCR was no longer "arguably believed to be the death knell of the movie business. Instead it became arguably its savior" because consumers preferred buying or renting films to recording their own onto blank tapes. Pamela Samuelson has remarked that "the Sony decision is the most significant legacy of Justice Stevens in the field of intellectual property law and its significance is likely to continue in mediating disputes between copyright industries and creative information technology developers and users of information technology."

The Digital Millennium Copyright Act of 1998 modified some aspects of copyright law that informed the Sony decision in several ways, causing new interpretations to be handed down in later disputes. Many of the same points of law that were litigated in this case have been argued in digital copyright cases, particularly peer-to-peer lawsuits; for example, in A&M Records, Inc. v. Napster, Inc. in 2001, the Ninth Circuit Court of Appeals rejected a fair use "space shifting" argument raised as an analogy to the time-shifting argument that prevailed in Sony. The Ninth Circuit further distinguished the cases because the Napster defendants operated a system that allowed them to monitor and control the potentially infringing activities of its users. In MGM Studios, Inc. v. Grokster, Ltd. in 2005, the Supreme Court extended this analysis to advanced video file-sharing systems.
