= Home Recording Rights Coalition =

Consumer advocacy organization

The Home Recording Rights Coalition is a non-profit advocacy organization in the U.S., whose mission is to protect the rights of consumers to view, listen to, and record radio and television broadcasts.

Founded in 1981 in response to the Sony Corp. of America v. Universal City Studios, Inc. case, the group has more recently urged the U.S. Congress and Federal Communications Commission to prevent for-profit corporations and their trade organizations (like the MPAA and RIAA) from eroding or even destroying the private, in-home fair use of new digital audio and video technologies, such as DTV, HDTV, DAB, DVD and others.

== See also ==
- Old-time radio § Home radio recordings in the United States
- Radio ripping
- Sony Corp. of America v. Universal City Studios, Inc.
