= The Crux (band) =

The Crux is a band from Santa Rosa, California. Their sound has been described as "Doc-Watson-by-way-of-Joe-Strummer," and "pirate cabaret."

== History ==
=== Founding, Bite the Hand Productions, and the Boogie Room & Gardens ===
Josh Windmiller and Tim Dixon met while working together in their hometown of Santa Rosa, California. The duo soon began writing songs together, sharing a common vision of "a traveling vaudevillian troupe of music, theater and circus performance."

In 2008 the band opened for The Devil Makes Three at the Phoenix Theater in Petaluma, California.

Many of The Crux's first performances were at a property in Santa Rosa called The Boogie Room & Gardens. "The Boogie Room" was DIY venue and home, hosting live music, theater, and workshops. The Crux supported the Boogie Room with many of their projects.

Josh and Tim founded a production company called Bite the Hand Productions to organize The Crux's events. Bite the Hand was also the producer of a monthly zine called The Pharmakon, as well as the "Insect Carnival" festivals at the Boogie Room in 2007 and 2008. The Crux headlined both festivals, and showcased the "Crux Tent Revival," a torchlit gospel set, both years.

The first year of The Crux and the Boogie Rom & Gardens is documented in the film Pharmakon (2009).

=== Now, Ferment ===
Bite the Hand Productions stopped publishing The Pharmakon zine in January, 2009. Also, The Boogie Room announced that it was going to close in April of the same year.

The Crux finished recording their first album in time to present their CD release party as one of the final shows at the Boogie Room. The album, "Now, Ferment," was recorded at Tim and Josh's home with Ross Harris (who has worked with Emily Jane White on her album Ode to Sentience). Pete Bernhard from the Devil Makes Three performed at the release party.

=== Be Merry ===
In the winter of 2009, Tim Dixon left the band. Josh decided to continue performing and recording with The Crux. The roster at this time was Josh Windmiller, Dominic Ziegler, Zoe Kessler, Adam LaBelle, Justin Walters, Rachel Bean, Jack Sawatzky, and Kalei Yamanoha. This lineup performed at the Whole Earth Music Festival and Maker Faire, and opened for acts such as Dark Dark Dark, Jason Webley, and Sean Hayes.

In the winter of 2011, Dominic Ziegler suffered a series of strokes. He died in January, 2012. The Crux's 2012 album, Be Merry, is dedicated to Ziegler and his family.

=== The Ratcatcher ===
Most members of The Crux left the band after the release of Be Merry, leaving only Josh and Kalei as active members. They added Travis Hendrix (clarinet, harmonica), Ben Weiner (percussion), Annie Cilley (fiddle, saxophone), and Josh Jackson (upright bass, cornet). All of these musicians are known from their work in the Church Marching Band.

The new arrangement immediately began working on a collaborative musical play with North Bay performing artists The Imaginists Theatre Collective and Layla Musselwhite. The result, a play titled "The Ratcatcher," is a modern adaptation of the Pied Piper legend. The songs from the play were recorded with Windmiller and Cilley singing on all of the principle vocal parts.

2013 also saw The Crux bring a new version of The Crux Tent Revival to Petaluma's annual Rivertown Revival Festival.

== Awards and honors ==
- "Best Musical Collaboration" with the Imaginists in San Francisco Bay Guardian 2012
- "Top 10 Local Theatre Shows, 2012" in the North Bay Bohemian (with the Imaginists)
- "Best Americana Band" in the North Bay Bohemian 2012
- Voted top ten "Bands We Love" in the Press Democrat 2012
- 1st CD, "Now, Ferment" top 30 at KUSF radio 2009
- "Top 10 Live Shows of 2008" in City Sound Inertia
- "Best Punk/Indie Band" in the North Bay Bohemian 2008

== Discography ==
- Now, Ferment (2009)
- Be Merry (2012)
- The Ratcatcher (2013)
