= Republica (album) =

Studio album by Republica
- Released: 30 July 1996
- Recorded: 1994–1995
- Studios: Milo Studios; The Workhouse Studios (London, United Kingdom)
- Genres: Alternative rock; electronica; electronic rock; trip hop
- Length: 48:22
- Labels: Deconstruction; RCA
- Producers: Republica; Ben Grosse

Republica chronology
Republica (1996)	Speed Ballads (1998)

Singles from Republica
- 1. "Bloke" Released: 23 January 1995; 2. "Ready to Go" Released: 17 February 1997; 3. "Drop Dead Gorgeous" Released: 21 April 1997

Professional ratings
Review scores
Source	Rating
AllMusic	4/5 stars
Cash Box	(favorable)
Los Angeles Times	3/4 stars
Music Week	3/5 stars
Smash Hits	4/5 stars
The Times	(favorable)

Republica is the debut studio album by English band Republica. It was first released in the United States on 30 July 1996 by RCA Records, and by Deconstruction Records in the United Kingdom. Three singles were released from the album: "Bloke", "Ready to Go" and "Drop Dead Gorgeous", the last two charting strongly.

Upon its release, Republica received generally positive reviews from music critics and was a commercial success. It peaked at number four on the UK Albums Chart. In the US, it reached number 153 on the Billboard 200 and was also successful in other countries, such as Germany and New Zealand.

A deluxe edition of the album was released on 28 February 2020 on Cherry Red Records.

== Track listing ==
All tracks are written by Saffron, Tim Dorney, Johnny Male, and Andy Todd, except 2, 3, 5, and 10 (Saffron, Dorney, Todd).

No.	Title	Length
1.	"Ready to Go"	5:01
2.	"Bloke"	4:56
3.	"Bitch"	5:13
4.	"Get Off"	3:57
5.	"Picture Me"	5:47
6.	"Drop Dead Gorgeous"	4:30
7.	"Out of the Darkness"	3:49
8.	"Wrapp"	1:45
9.	"Don't You Ever"	4:00
10.	"Holly"	4:23
11.	"Ready to Go" (original mix)	5:01
Total length:		48:22

=== Limited edition ===
Released in 1997 with an alternate album cover and bonus live CD.

CD2 - Republica Live
No.	Title	Length
1.	"Drop Dead Gorgeous"	5:09
2.	"Bloke"	5:10
3.	"Get Off"	4:01
4.	"Ready to Go"	4:30
5.	"Out of the Darkness"	3:41
6.	"Holly"	6:04

=== Deluxe edition ===
This was released on the 90/9 imprint of Cherry Red Records on 28 February 2020.

CD1
No.	Title	Length
1.	"Ready to Go"	5:01
2.	"Bloke"	4:51
3.	"Bitch"	5:15
4.	"Get Off"	3:56
5.	"Picture Me"	5:42
6.	"Drop Dead Gorgeous"	4:30
7.	"Out of the Darkness"	3:49
8.	"Wrapp"	1:44
9.	"Don't You Ever"	3:59
10.	"Holly"	4:23
11.	"Mutha"	3:59
12.	"Introlude"	2:13
13.	"Ready to Go" (original mix)	5:02
14.	"Drop Dead Gorgeous" (original mix)	4:50
15.	"Bloke" (original mix)	4:18
16.	"Bitch" (original mix)	4:05
17.	"Holly" (original mix)	4:24
18.	"Out of This World" (Republica mix)	4:33

CD2
No.	Title	Length
1.	"Out of This World" (original mix)	8:08
2.	"Bloke" (extended mix)	6:40
3.	"Holly" (full mix)	7:06
4.	"Ready to Go" (original extended mix)	7:41
5.	"Drop Dead Gorgeous" (Pop Fiction mix)	3:39
6.	"Bloke" (Blame It On the Vodka mix)	6:18
7.	"Ready to Go" (Smash's Disco mix)	5:42
8.	"Out of This World" (alternative mix)	6:42
9.	"Bloke" (Jack Daniels mix)	7:32
10.	"Holly" (Republica club mix)	8:03
11.	"Drop Dead Gorgeous" (Riprock's Runway mix)	7:08
12.	"Out of This World" (Proper Night Out mix)	5:08

CD3
No.	Title	Length
1.	"Out of This World" (The Chemical Brothers mix)	7:04
2.	"Bloke" (Blakkat remix)	5:07
3.	"Ready to Go" (Smash's Club extended mix)	5:42
4.	"Drop Dead Gorgeous" (Riprock's One Way dub)	7:21
5.	"Out of This World" (Rub-A-Dub-Sub mix)	7:04
6.	"Ready to Go" (Dramaboy's Babyyan mix)	7:50
7.	"Holly" (Fabio Paras mix)	8:48
8.	"Bitch" (Way Out West mix)	6:18
9.	"Out of This World" (Prankster Bends The Frequency mix)	5:46
10.	"Bloke" (Blakkat instrumental mix)	5:07
11.	"Ready to Go" (Gavin And Scott Hardkiss' Remixica)	8:24
12.	"Out of This World" (The Chemical Brothers dub)	5:21

== Personnel ==
Republica

- Saffron – vocals
- Tim Dorney – keyboards
- Andy Todd – keyboards
- Johnny Male – guitar
- Alix Tiernan – drums

Additional personnel

- Ben Grosse – additional producer, programming
- Dave Arch – piano
- Paul Cartledge – guitar
- Pete Davis – keyboards, programming
- Jez Williams – guitar
- Randy Jacobs – guitar
- Grant Mohrman – guitar
- Marlon Young – guitar
- Sal Aiello – guitar
- Ian Tregoning – mixing
- Phil Dane – mixing
- Jesus Beats – programming
- John Vitale – programming, guitar
- Mike Tuller – programming

== Charts ==
=== Weekly charts ===
Weekly chart performance for Republica
Chart (1996–1997)	Peak position
Australian Albums (ARIA)	95
Austrian Albums (Ö3 Austria)	34
German Albums (Offizielle Top 100)	47
Dutch Albums (Album Top 100)	36
New Zealand Albums (RMNZ)	26
Scottish Albums (Official Charts)	9
Swiss Albums (Schweizer Hitparade)	48
UK Albums (Official Charts)	4
US Billboard 200	153
Chart (2021)	Peak position
UK Independent Albums (Official Charts)	34

=== Year-end charts ===
Year-end chart performance for Republica
Chart (1997)	Position
UK Albums (OCC)	60

== Certifications and sales ==
Certifications and sales for Republica
Region	Certification	Certified units/sales
United Kingdom (BPI)	Gold	100,000^{^}
United States	—	200,000
^{^} Shipments figures based on certification alone.
