= Victorian America =

Studio album by Emily Jane White
- Released: October 9, 2009 (France); April 27, 2010 (US)
- Genre: Neofolk, Folk, Dark folk, Rock
- Label: Talitres Records (France); Milan Records (US)
- Producer: Nick Bobetsky, Jean-Christophe Chamboredon, Emily Jane White

Emily Jane White chronology
Dark Undercoat (2007)	Victorian America (2009)	Ode to Sentience (2010)

Victorian America is the second album by Emily Jane White. It was released on October 9, 2009, in France by Talitres Records and on April 27, 2010, in the U.S. by Milan Records.

== Critical reception ==
Professional ratings
Review scores
Source	Rating
Allmusic	4/5 stars
Pitchfork Media	(7.1/10)
Slant Magazine	2.5/5 stars
Venus Zine	4/5 stars

Allmusic gave a positive review, commenting that "White sticks with the formula, and ekes out another quiet triumph." By contrast, Slant Magazine opined that "there's a measure of sustained dreariness in the middling fulfillment of low expectations."

== Chart performance ==
Victorian America debuted and peaked at #113 on the French Albums Chart. It spent a total of 6 weeks on the chart, becoming her highest and longest charting album to date.

== Promotion ==
The music videos for "Victorian America" (2009) and "A Shot Rang Out" (2010) was directed by a longtime collaborator Cam Archer.

The song "Liza" was featured on Pitchfork Media's Forkcast list.

== Track listing ==
No.	Title	Writer(s)	Length
1.	"Never Dead"	White	3:30
2.	"Stairs"	White	6:03
3.	"Victorian America"	White	4:20
4.	"The Baby"	White	4:53
5.	"Frozen Heart"	White	5:36
6.	"The Country Life"	White	4:11
7.	"Liza"	White	3:58
8.	"The Ravens"	White	7:11
9.	"Red Serpent"	White	3:44
10.	"Red Dress"	White	6:49
11.	"A Shot Rang Out"	White	4:36
12.	"Ghost of a Horse"	White	5:54

== Personnel ==
- Cam Archer - photography
- Nick Bobetsky - executive producer
- Jean-Christophe Chamboredon - executive producer
- Josh Fossgreen - bass (upright)
- Jennifer Grady - arranger, cello, vocals
- Ross Harris - arranger, drums, mixing
- Wainwright Hewlett - producer, engineer, mixing
- Carey Lamprecht - violin, arranger, vocals
- Jake Mann - arranger, bass (electric)
- Henry Nagle - pedal steel, arranger, guitar (electric)
- Josh Staples - design
- Emily Jane White - organ, guitar, percussion, piano, arranger, composer, vocals, producer

== Charts ==
Chart (2009)	Peak position
French Albums Chart	113
