= Dark Undercoat =

Studio album by Emily Jane White
- Released: Nov 22, 2007
- Genre: Neofolk, folk, dark folk
- Length: 42:52
- Label: Talitres Records (France); Double Negative Records (US)

Emily Jane White chronology
Dark Undercoat (2007)	Victorian America (2009)

Professional ratings
Review scores
Source	Rating
Allmusic	4.5/5 stars
PopMatters	5/10 stars
Slant Magazine	3.5/5 stars
Venus Zine	4/5 stars

Dark Undercoat is the debut album by Emily Jane White released in 2007 on label Double Negative Records in the U.S. and by Talitres records in France.

== Promotion ==
Cam Archer directed the music videos for "Wild Tigers I Have Known" (2006), "Dagger" (2007), and "Dark Undercoat" (2007). The video for "Wild Tigers I Have Known" is included as an extra on the DVD release of Archer's film Wild Tigers I Have Known, which takes its name from White's song.

== Track listing ==
No.	Title	Length
1.	"Bessie Smith"	3:27
2.	"Hole in the Middle"	3:27
3.	"Dark Undercoat"	4:57
4.	"Dagger"	5:12
5.	"Time on Your Side"	2:22
6.	"The Demon"	5:50
7.	"Sleeping Dead"	4:31
8.	"Blue"	4:29
9.	"Wild Tigers I Have Known"	4:18
10.	"Two Shots to the Head"	4:19

== Personnel ==
- Cam Archer - photography
- Wainwright Hewlett - engineer, mastering, mixing
- Emily Jane White - guitar, piano, vocals

== Charts ==
Chart (2008)	Peak position
French Albums Chart	143
