= Drop Dead Gorgeous =

Drop Dead Gorgeous or drop-dead gorgeous may refer to:

- "Drop Dead Gorgeous" (song), a 1997 song by Republica
- Drop Dead Gorgeous (film), a 1999 film directed by Michael Patrick Jann
- Drop Dead Gorgeous (TV series), a 2006 BBC television series
- Drop Dead, Gorgeous, a post-hardcore band from Colorado, founded in 2004
- Drop Dead Gorgeous, a 2010 independent film featuring actor Jeremy London
- "Drop Dead Gorgeous", 2001 Aerosmith song from their album Just Push Play
- "Drop Dead Gorgeous", an episode in season one of Tru Calling aired in 2004

== See also ==
- Dead Gorgeous, a 2010 Australian television series
