= Speed Ballads =

Studio album by Republica
- Released: 5 October 1998
- Recorded: Republica, Westside, Metropolis, Strongroom, Whitfield Street, The Barge & Heirophony, London
- Length: 39:38
- Labels: Deconstruction; BMG
- Producers: Ian Stanley; Andy Gray; Clive Langer; Alan Winstanley; Ian Broudie

Republica chronology
Republica (1996)	Speed Ballads (1998)	Christiana Obey (2013)

Professional ratings
Review scores
Source	Rating
Allmusic	3/5 stars
NME	2/5 stars

Speed Ballads is the second album by English band Republica. Released in 1998, the album was the follow-up to Republica's self-titled debut album.

== Release ==
Speed Ballads reached #37 on the UK Album Charts. The album never received release in the United States, until being released digitally worldwide.

On 22 April 2023 - Record Store Day - the album was released on vinyl for the first time, with a run of 1,000 copies.

== Singles ==
The album spawned only one single, "From Rush Hour With Love." It achieved modest success, peaking at number 20 on the UK Singles chart, but spending only three weeks on the chart. The follow-up single, "Try Everything," received only limited release, due to the bankruptcy and closure of Deconstruction Records, the group's label.

== Critical reception ==
The album was met with mixed reviews from contemporary music critics. AllMusic's Jason Damas felt that the album "exhibits some remarkable growth" over its predecessor, calling the album "far more diverse" and highlighting "Try Everything," "From Rush Hour with Love," and "Fading of the Man" as choice cuts.

== Track listing ==
All tracks are written by Saffron, Tim Dorney, and Johnny Male, except 3 (Saffron, Dorney, Male, Guy Batson), 4 and 7 (Saffron, Dorney, Male, Andy Todd), 6 (Saffron, Dorney, Male, Jeremy Williams), and 9 (Saffron, Dorney, Male, Pete Smith).

No.	Title	Length
1.	"From Rush Hour with Love"	3:25
2.	"Fading of the Man"	4:34
3.	"Try Everything"	4:02
4.	"Luxury Cage"	5:03
5.	"Faster Faster"	3:20
6.	"Nothing's Feeling New"	3:51
7.	"Millennium"	3:14
8.	"Pretty Girl Hate"	3:47
9.	"Kung Fu Movies"	4:00
10.	"Pub Pusher"	4:22
Total length:		39:38

=== B-sides ===
There are known to be six non-album B-sides from the Speed Ballads era. All tracks are written by Saffron, Tim Dorney, and Johnny Male, with co-writing on "Ready to Go" (live from Cardiff) and "Drop Dead Gorgeous" (live from Cardiff) by Andy Todd.

- "World Ends in the Morning" (from the "From Rush Hour with Love" CD single) – 2:26
- "Clone My Soul" (from the "From Rush Hour with Love" CD single) – 2:08
- "House Special" (from the "From Rush Hour with Love" 7" Vinyl single)
- "From Rush Hour with Love" [Westside Story] (From the "Try Everything" CD1 promo single) – 4:05
- "Ready to Go" [Live from Cardiff] (From the "Try Everything" CD2 promo single) – 4:56
- "Drop Dead Gorgeous" [Live from Cardiff] (From the "Try Everything" CD2 promo single) – 5:07

== Personnel ==
=== Republica ===
- Saffron – vocals
- Tim Dorney - keyboards, programming, mixing
- Jonny Male – guitar

=== Additional musicians ===
- Pete Riley – drums

=== Technical ===
- Ian Stanley – producer
- Andy Gray – producer, mixing
- Clive Langer – producer, mixing
- Alan Winstanley – producer, mixing
- Ian Broudie – producer
- Bob Kraushaar – mixing
- Gary Langan – mixing
- Ross Cullum – mixing
- Cenzo Townshend – mixing
- Brian Pugsley – additional engineering
- Jon Astley – mastering
- Mike Diver – photography, manipulation
- Big Active Ltd. – design
