= Republica =

English alternative rock band

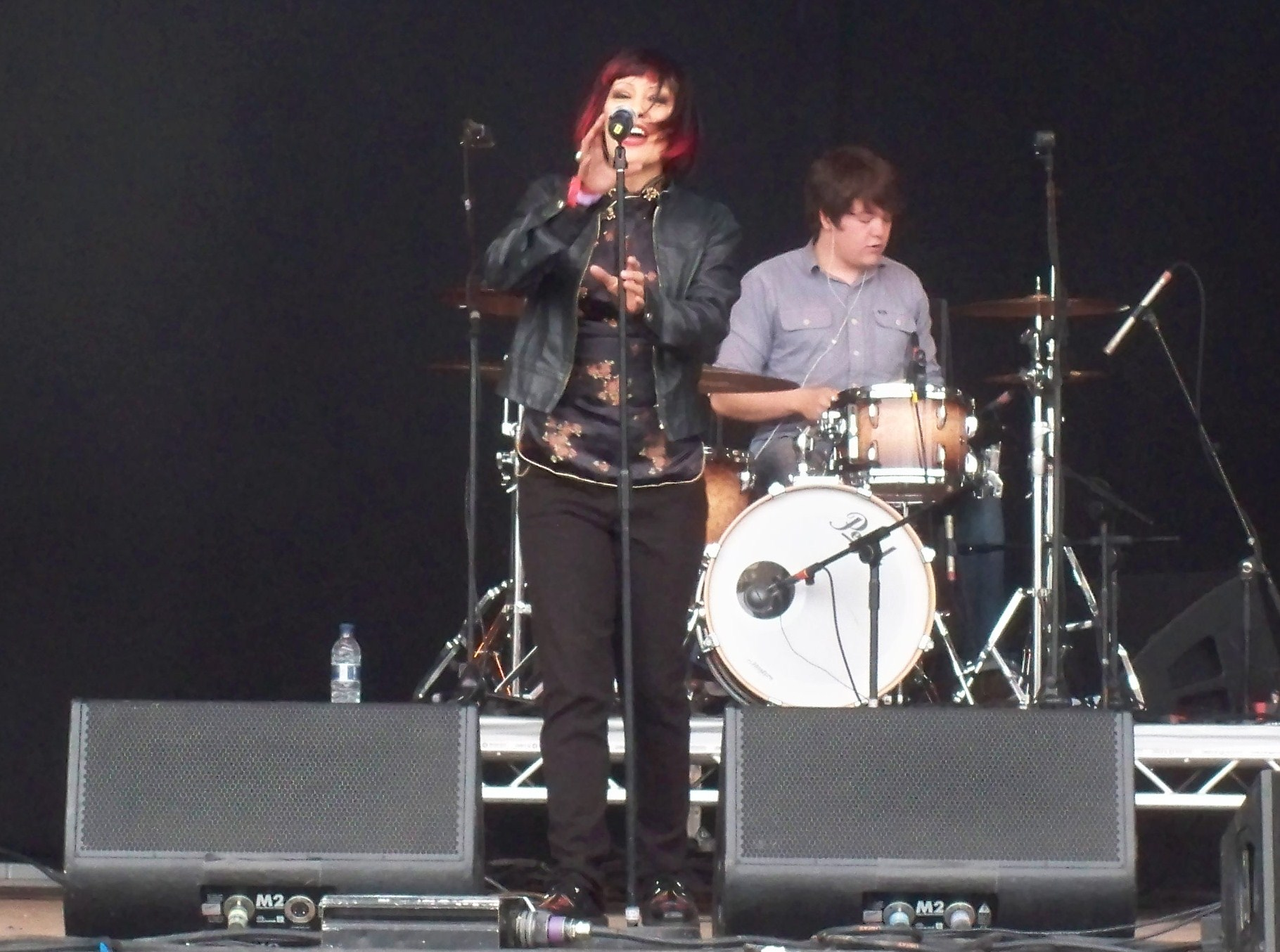
- Republica at Guilfest 2012

Background information
- Origin: Windsor, Berkshire, England
- Genres: Alternative rock; alternative dance; synth-pop; dance-punk; breakbeat; electronic; Britpop
- Years active: 1994–2001; 2008–present
- Labels: Deconstruction; Sony BMG; Armalyte Industries
- Members: Saffron
- Past members: Andy Todd; David Barbarossa; Alix Tiernan; Mick Pirie; Tim Dorney; Johnny Male
- Website: republicamusic.co.uk

Republica are an English alternative rock band formed in 1994. They reached the height of their popularity from 1996 to 1999. The band went on hiatus in 2001 and reunited in 2008.

The Republica sound was described by the band as "technopop punk rock". Saffron (vocals) is the sole member, the rest of the original band having left.

== History ==
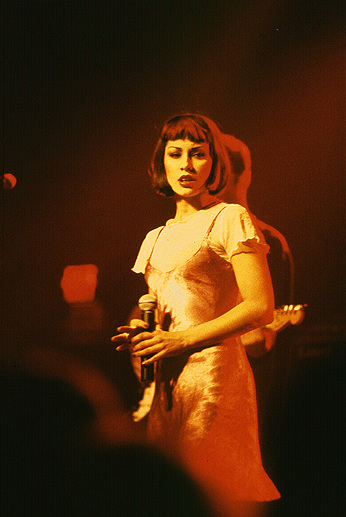
Republica live at San Antonio, TX in December 1996

=== 1994–1997: Beginnings, debut album and international success ===
Former Flowered Up keyboardist Tim Dorney met producer/engineer Andy Todd while both musicians were working in the studio for the band Soul Family Sensation. The two decided to form Republica as an electronic-oriented outfit. They recruited singer Saffron, who was an actress at one point, performing for two years in London's Starlight Express. She also appeared in the video for Chesney Hawkes' hit "The One and Only" and in the video for N-Joi's single "Mindflux". She was also lead vocalist on N-Joi's hit "Anthem" in 1990. Republica's first lineup was rounded out with Alix Tiernan on drums and Mick Pirie on bass. Influences on the band included Simple Minds, Japan, the Human League, Gary Numan, OMD, Depeche Mode, the Cure, the Clash, the Jam, Gang of Four, and Siouxsie and the Banshees.

Republica released their first single "Out of This World" in 1994, followed by the single "Bloke" in March 1995. After the music video for "Bloke" was filmed, Johnny Male joined the band on guitar. Male was an acquaintance of Dorney and Todd, since Male was formerly a member of Soul Family Sensation. Their television debut occurred in April that same year, on the program The White Room. Pirie departed from the band later that year. In April 1996, their single "Ready to Go" became their first to chart on the UK Singles Chart, when it reached No. 43. Their debut album Republica was released in the United States in July 1996 and reached No. 4 in the UK Albums Chart after being released there in 1997. "Ready to Go" was re-released in remixed form, with a rock-oriented sound. This version became their signature single and reached No. 13. The fourth single, "Drop Dead Gorgeous", reached No. 7. To promote Republica, the band brought in ex-Adam and the Ants and Bow Wow Wow founder David Barbarossa on drums as Tiernan switched to strictly percussion (although Tiernan eventually departed in 1996).

The group attracted positive press coverage. Emerging after a wave of female-fronted rock bands (such as Elastica, Lush, Sleeper, Echobelly and Kenickie), they had, like Curve and Garbage, a notably more aggressive and electronic sound. In 1997, they contributed a cover of "Are 'Friends' Electric?" to the Gary Numan tribute album Random. That same year, Saffron performed vocals for the Prodigy's "Fuel My Fire" from their album The Fat of the Land. By early 1998, when Barbarossa and Todd left the band, Republica continued as a trio.

=== 1998–2001: Speed Ballads and dissolution ===
The band's second album, Speed Ballads, was released in 1998 and reached No. 37 in UK Albums Chart. Its lead single, "From Rush Hour With Love", peaked at No. 20 in UK Singles Chart. The band suffered when their label, Deconstruction Records, folded shortly after the release of Speed Ballads. Deconstruction's back catalogue was swallowed up by BMG and Speed Ballads was never released in the United States. In 2001, Republica went on hiatus. On their official site it was posted the message "Republica are not recording at this time".

=== 2002–2009: Hiatus ===
In 2002 BMG released the compilation Ready to Go: The Best Of against the band's wishes. After the band went on hiatus, Saffron worked with the Cure, appearing on the single "Just Say Yes" from their Greatest Hits album. She also collaborated with Junkie XL for his 2003 album Radio JXL: A Broadcast from the Computer Hell Cabin. In September 2008, Republica reunited at Windsor at a Contra Mundum concert. They played "Ready to Go", "Drop Dead Gorgeous" and a cover of "You Got the Love".

=== 2010–2020: Reunion, sporadic performances and new material ===
In early 2010, Republica performed a string of gigs. They also issued a remixed version of "Ready to Go" entitled "Ready to Go 2010". In June 2010 the remix was released and reached No. 1 on the Upfront Club chart. The track was produced by Andy Gray and Alan Moulder. In October 2010, the band performed a comeback gig at O2 Academy Islington followed by several dates in Eastern Europe and the Middle East in 2011. They performed at GuilFest in July 2012.

The band released a new EP, Christiana Obey, and also recorded a session for Brentwood radio station Phoenix FM in April 2013. A joint 20th anniversary tour with the band Space took place in the spring of 2014. In October and early November 2014, Republica toured the UK in support of the Boomtown Rats "Ratlife" tour and took the opportunity to premiere some new material. Friday 29 May 2015 saw the public debut of more new material when Republica performed at the "Under The Bridge" venue in Chelsea, London, with support from Tenek and Kenelis. A deluxe edition of Republica was released on 28 February 2020 on Cherry Red Records.

=== 2021–present: Damaged Gods ===
The band released a new single, "New York" in November 2023, from their upcoming studio album Damaged Gods scheduled to be released in the spring of 2025, their first in 27 years, on Armalyte Industries. The second single off the album, "Hallelujah", was released 28 June 2024. As of May 2026, the album remains unreleased.

In June 2024, Saffron announced that Steve Hewitt, former drummer of Placebo and Six by Seven, had joined Republica as the band's live drummer. That same year, both Dorney and Male departed from Republica, leaving Saffron as the only remaining member of the band.

== Members ==
=== Members ===
- Saffron – lead vocals, tambourine, guitar (1994–2001, 2008–present)

=== Touring members ===
- Steve Hewitt – drums (2024–present)
- Maxine Cahill – guitar (2025–present)

=== Former members ===
- Andy Todd – keyboards, guitar, bass (1994–1998)
- Mick Pirie – bass (1994–1995)
- Alix Tiernan – drums, percussion (1994–1996)
- Tim Dorney – keyboards (1994–2001, 2008–2024)
- Johnny Male – guitar, bass (1995–2001, 2008–2024)
- David Barbarossa – drums, percussion (1996–1998)

=== Former touring members ===
- Pete Riley – drums (1998–2001)
- Nigel Champion – drums (2008–2012)
- Conor Lawrence – drums (2012–2024)
- Timm Hamm – bass (2013–2015)

== Discography ==
=== Studio albums ===
Title	Album details	Peak chart positions									Certifications
Title	Album details	UK	AUS	AUT	GER	NED	NZ	SCO	SWI	US	Certifications
Republica	Released: 30 July 1996; Label: Deconstruction, RCA; Formats: cassette, CD, LP	4	95	34	47	36	26	9	48	153	BPI: Gold
Speed Ballads	Released: 5 October 1998; Label: Deconstruction; Formats: cassette, CD, LP	37	—	—	—	—	—	45	—	—	
Damaged Gods	Released: TBA; Label: Armalyte Industries; Formats: TBA	To be released									
"—" denotes a recording that did not chart.

=== Compilation albums ===
Title	Release date	Label
Ready to Go: The Best Of	May 2002	Camden

=== Live albums ===
Title	Release date	Label
Live at the Astoria	March 2013	Independent

=== Extended plays ===
Title	Release date	Label
Christiana Obey	March 2013	Independent

=== Singles ===
Title	Year	Peak chart positions										Certifications	Album
Title	Year	UK	AUS	GER	IRE	NED	NZ	SCO	SWE	SWI	US	Certifications	Album
"Out of This World" (Note: "Out of This World" was later re-mixed and re-named Out of the Darkness for the band's self-titled album.)	1994	—	—	—	—	—	—	—	—	—	—		Non-album single
"Bloke"	1995	81	—	—	—	—	—	—	—	—	—		Republica
"Ready to Go" (original mix)	1996	43	—	—	—	—	—	59	—	—	—		Republica
"Ready to Go" (remix)	1997	13	40	33	26	25	42	12	40	34	56	BPI: Silver	Republica
"Drop Dead Gorgeous"	1997	7	131	90	—	—	—	30	8	—	93		Republica
"From Rush Hour with Love"	1998	20	—	—	—	—	—	21	—	—	—		Speed Ballads
"Ready to Go" (remix with Tomcraft)	2007	—	—	—	—	—	—	—	—	—	—		For the Queen (Tomcraft album)
"Ready to Go 2010"	2010	—	—	—	—	—	—	—	—	—	—		Non-album single
"New York"	2023	—	—	—	—	—	—	—	—	—	—		Damaged Gods
"Hallelujah"	2024	—	—	—	—	—	—	—	—	—	—		Damaged Gods
"—" denotes a recording that did not chart.

==== Promotional singles ====
Title	Year	Album
"Holly"	1995	Republica
"Try Everything"	1998	Speed Ballads

=== Music videos ===
- "Bloke", 1995
- "Ready to Go" (original mix), 1996
- "Ready to Go" (Ben Grosse mix), 1997
- "Drop Dead Gorgeous", 1997
- "From Rush Hour with Love" (version 1), 1998
- "From Rush Hour with Love" (version 2), 1998
- "Try Everything", 1998
- "Christiana Obey", 2013
- "New York", 2023
- "Hallelujah", 2024

== See also ==
- List of alternative music artists
