= Ready to Go (Republica song) =

1996 single by Republica

Single by Republica

from the album Republica
- Released: 15 April 1996 (original mix); 17 February 1997 (remix)
- Genre: Dance-rock; alternative rock
- Length: 5:01
- Label: Deconstruction; BMG
- Songwriters: Saffron; Tim Dorney; Andy Todd; Johnny Male
- Producers: Republica; Ben Grosse

Republica singles chronology
"Bloke" (1995)	"Ready to Go" (1996)	"Drop Dead Gorgeous" (1997)

Music video
- "Ready to Go" on YouTube

"Ready to Go" is a song by English alternative rock band Republica, released as a single in April 1996 from the band's debut album, Republica (1996). Two versions of the song, the US mix and the original mix, were included. This version was later featured on a greatest hits collection, Ready to Go: The Best Of.

The single originally reached number 43 on the UK Singles Chart in April 1996. Later in the year, a remix of the song began to gain popularity outside the United Kingdom, charting in Australia, Canada, and the United States. The remix was released in the United Kingdom in February 1997, when it reached a new peak of number 13. This rerelease also saw the song chart for the first time in western Europe, reaching number 19 in the Netherlands and number 26 in Ireland.

German DJ Tomcraft released a cover of the song in 2007, and another version was released on 7 June 2010. It continues to be successful in the UK, where it is still frequently featured in advertisements and on TV.

== Background ==
Lyrically, the song is inspired by 1970s and 1980s avant-punk singers who sang about everyday, real-life happenings "that weren't existential or just a love song." Singer Saffron said,

For me, "Ready To Go" is about my life. This is what happened to me and this is how I felt, but in an empowering way - someone said this to me, but I don't allow that. I will not allow that to affect me, because I'm strong. I have a voice. Make it a positive. The energy behind it is about independence and confidence.

She added, "It was a broader sense, a collective sense of young women and girls growing up in the '90s, because radio would not even listen to any female-fronted band that wrote their own songs. You had to fight so hard in a business that's very cutthroat and is predominantly male dominated. So it was like a battle cry."

== Main versions ==
"Ready to Go" (unreleased)
Also known as "Ready to Go [1996]", "Ready to Go (original)" or incorrectly as "Ready to Go (album version)", it was not included in any of the band's albums. It is an unreleased song or probably an early demo with slightly different vocal (but lyrics remain the same). This version is softer than both the US and original mixes of the song. It does not have the piano bridge of the original mix, nor the guitar bridge of the US mix. The bridge is similar to that of the original mix, except it lacks a piano.

"Ready to Go" (original mix)
Also known as "Ready to Go (original UK mix)", this version has a more techno-pop sound while the later version contains electric guitars. It charted at number 43 in the United Kingdom.

"Ready to Go"
A mix was included in the Republica album as the opening track. It was remixed by Ben Grosse and released as a single in 1997. This version is the most well-known. It sounds faster and its beat is stronger, making it heavier in terms of tones. On the UK and American issues of the Republica album, this mix of the song was credited just as "Ready to Go", and on the European issue of the album it is sometimes marked as "Ready to Go (US mix)". A defining difference between this mix and earlier recordings is the inclusion of a guitar bridge in the place of a piano bridge.

"Ready to Go" (Tomcraft version)
German DJ Tomcraft released a Eurodance version of the track in 2007.

"Ready to Go 2010"
A new version of the track was released in June 2010. A preview of the track was made available on the band's official Myspace page. The new version has a more aggressive sound than its two predecessors.

== Critical reception ==
Scottish Aberdeen Evening Express stated that "this classic bit of punk-fuelled dance could well do the business." Daina Darzin from Cash Box felt the song "has monster radio hit written all over it." She added, "An intense, percolating, anthemic dance/rock thing that begs to boom out of the radios of convertibles nationwide, "Ready To Go" has been the Modern Rock #1 most added two weeks in a row, with consecutive double digit adds, including 99X in Atlanta, The Edge in Dallas, WBCN in Boston and Q101 in Chicago." The Daily Vault's Alfredo Narvaez declared it as "one of the best examples of pop mixing with techno. The song throws in acoustic guitars, electric guitars and every other noise you can think of and it sounds great." Tracey Pepper from Entertainment Weekly noted that it "erupts with a blast of fuzzed-out power chords, driving dance rhythms, and a rallying sing-along chorus." Elysa Gardner from Los Angeles Times complimented its "yummy hooks and breathless dance beats", that are "as irresistible as singer Saffron's Debbie Harry-meets-Siouxsie Sioux moxie. Pure, exhilarating fun."

Mark Roland from Melody Maker wrote, "Rabble-rousing techno/guitar pop from a yob-gobbed young lady known as Saffron and the keyboard player from Flowered Up. So that's where he got to. It's a crack, I'm back/Yeah, I'm standing on the rooftops having it, Saffron whelps in the climatic chorus. [...] Slick and bright-eyed pop for the livelier daytime radio listener." Pan-European magazine Music & Media found that here, "techno meets rock guitar with strident vocals from singer Saffron, all adding up to a fresh, gritty pop sound which Europe simply can't afford to miss." A reviewer from Music Week gave the song four out of five, adding that "this techno pop rock outfit, bursting with potential, lay down a mean, radio friendly single." Dave Fawbert from ShortList called it a "bloody good tune". Ben Knowles from Smash Hits said in his review of Republica, that the song is a "good taster from their cocktail of shouty pop, mad bouncy dance and fun guitars." David Sinclair from The Times viewed it as a "rock/dance hybrid featuring the imposing vocals of Saffron".

== Music videos ==
Two different music videos were released, each for the different versions of the song. In the video for the original single release, lead singer Saffron is jumping on the roof of a building. The video was released in 1996, and the shots took place somewhere in East London. This video is very sunny and upbeat. The video also features lead singer Saffron playing the Sega Saturn video games Virtua Fighter 2 and Hang-On GP. The second music video, produced by Ben Grosse for the remix of the track, was released in early 1997. Saffron is shown singing in a warehouse with the band, then she is jumping, dancing and doing humorous mimics in front of the camera, often singing into a large megaphone. The video features rapid edit cuts, fast frame rates and zooming, and artificial colourisation.

== Impact and legacy ==
American entertainment company BuzzFeed ranked "Ready to Go" number 37 in their list of "The 101 Greatest Dance Songs of the '90s" in 2017. It is used as the song that both Sunderland A.F.C. and Farnborough F.C. walk out to upon entering the pitch before a match begins. "Ready to Go" was featured as the theme song for the Top Thrill Dragster roller coaster at Cedar Point, until its closure in 2021. In 2024, Republica confirmed that a rereleased version of the song will be used for Top Thrill 2. Same year, Billboard magazine ranked the song number 94 in their list of "The 100 Greatest Jock Jams of All Time".

== Track listing ==
- 1996 UK CD single
1. "Ready to Go" (radio edit) – 3:39
2. "Ready to Go" (album mix) – 5:01
3. "Bloke" – 4:51
- 1997 UK CD single
1. "Ready to Go" (radio edit) – 3:39
2. "Ready to Go" (original mix) – 5:01
3. "Bloke" – 4:51
4. "Holly" (club mix) – 8:03
- 2007 CD single
1. "Ready to Go" (club mix)
2. "Ready to Go" (radio edit)
3. "Ready to Go" (L&T's latenight mix)
- "Ready to Go 2010"
1. "Ready to Go 2010" (radio edit) – 3:17
2. "Ready to Go 2010" (full length) – 4:15

== Charts ==
=== Weekly charts ===
1996 weekly chart performance for "Ready to Go" (original mix)
Chart (1996)	Peak position
Estonia (Eesti Top 20)	12
Europe (Eurochart Hot 100)	96
Latvia (Latvijas Top 50)	19
Scottish Singles Sales (Official Charts)	59
UK Singles (Official Charts)	43

1996 weekly chart performance for "Ready to Go" (remix)
Chart (1996)	Peak position
Australia (ARIA)	40
Canada Top Singles (RPM)	60
Canada Dance/Urban (RPM)	14
US Billboard Hot 100	56
US Alternative Airplay (Billboard)	7
US Pop Airplay (Billboard)	36
US Cash Box Top 100	54

1997 weekly chart performance for "Ready to Go" (remix)
Chart (1997)	Peak position
Belgium (Ultratip Bubbling Under Flanders)	8
Europe (Eurochart Hot 100)	25
Germany (GfK)	33
Iceland (Íslenski Listinn Topp 40)	12
Ireland (IRMA)	26
Israel (Israeli Singles Chart)	12
Mexico (Notitas Musicales)	1
Netherlands (Dutch Top 40)	19
Netherlands (Single Top 100)	25
Scottish Singles Sales (Official Charts)	12
Sweden (Sverigetopplistan)	40
Switzerland (Schweizer Hitparade)	34
UK Singles (Official Charts)	13

=== Year-end charts ===
1996 year-end chart performance for "Ready to Go"
Chart (1996)	Position
Latvia (Latvijas Top 50)	188
US Modern Rock Tracks (Billboard)	40

1997 year-end chart performance for "Ready to Go"
Chart (1997)	Position
UK Singles (OCC)	166

== Certifications ==
Certifications for "Ready to Go"
Region	Certification	Certified units/sales
United Kingdom (BPI)	Silver	200,000^{‡}
^{‡} Sales+streaming figures based on certification alone.
