= Wild Tigers I Have Known =

- Theatrical release poster
- Directed by: Cam Archer
- Written by: Cam Archer
- Produced by: Cam Archer
- Starring: Malcolm Stumpf; Patrick White; Max Paradise; Fairuza Balk; Kim Dickens; Tom Gilroy
- Cinematography: Aaron Platt
- Edited by: Cam Archer
- Music by: Nate Archer
- Production companies: Cut and Paste Films
- Distributed by: IFC First Take
- Release dates: January 2006 (Sundance Film Festival); February 28, 2007 (United States)
- Running time: 81 minutes 98 minutes (director's cut)
- Country: United States
- Language: English
- Box office: $28,190

Wild Tigers I Have Known is a 2006 coming of age drama film written, edited, produced, and directed by Cam Archer and starring Malcolm Stumpf, Patrick White, Max Paradise, Fairuza Balk, Kim Dickens, and Tom Gilroy. The film follows Logan, a lonely 13-year-old, as he comes to terms with his sexual identity, the hell of middle school, wild mountain lions, and life with his single mother.

The film premiered at the 2006 Sundance Film Festival and was given a limited release by IFC Films on February 28, 2007. The IFC-released version had a shorter runtime than the one shown at Sundance. In 2021, an updated Blu-ray of the film was released that honored Archer's original cut of the film.

== Plot ==
Logan is a 13-year-old daydreamer who is starting to come into the realization he might be gay. Unaware of how to hide his sexual orientation, he quickly becomes a target for bullying by his peers. He also starts to experiment with cross-dressing and wearing makeup. His best friend, the nerdy Joey, starts to distance himself when Logan insists on wearing lipstick for a photograph. Logan befriends Rodeo, a popular ninth-grader who does not join in on making Logan's life miserable. Logan develops a crush on Rodeo and soon finds himself creating the persona of "Leah", a girl who has all the confidence Logan lacks. Using the voice of Leah, Logan calls Rodeo on the phone and, pretending to be a female admirer, leaves him seductive messages. Meanwhile, wild mountain lions have been straying into populated areas of town. When one happens to wander onto the school's campus and is shot dead, it signifies a moment in Logan's coming-of-age.

== Cast ==
- Malcolm Stumpf as Logan
- Patrick White as Rodeo
- Max Paradise as Joey
- Fairuza Balk as Logan's Mom
- Kim Dickens as The Counselor
- Tom Gilroy as The Principal

== Production ==
The film is based on Archer's short film Bobbycrush. Said Archer, "I just wanted to make a film about being a lonely, daydreamer kid, and how a long-spent lonely childhood can lead to something of an identity crisis, or lack of identity." The script was accepted into the 2005 Sundance Screenwriter's Lab, where it was workshopped.

Gus Van Sant and producer Scott Rudin were executive producers on the film, in addition to producers Lars Knudsen and Jay Van Hoy.

The film was shot in and around Archer's hometown of Santa Cruz, California.

== Music ==
The film's soundtrack features music by Comets on Fire, Current 93, Emily Jane White, Nate Archer, Nina Simone, Pantaleimon, and Six Organs of Admittance.

Emily Jane White's contribution, the song "Wild Tigers I Have Known", was written specifically for the film and can be heard during the end credits. The song appears on the film's official soundtrack and on White's debut album, Dark Undercoat. A music video, produced and directed by Archer, is included as an extra on the DVD release of the film.

== Reception ==
=== Release ===
The film had its world premiere at the 2006 Sundance Film Festival, and went on to be screened at New Directors/New Films Festival, London International Film Festival, Locarno International Film Festival, and AFI Film Festival.

On February 28, 2007, the film was released theatrically by IFC Films. The IFC release was a shorter edition than Archer's original cut as some scenes were excised. The original length was 98 minutes long, compared to the 81-minute theatrical cut.

=== Critical reception ===
On Rotten Tomatoes, the film has an approval rating of 67% based on 24 reviews. The site's consensus reads, "Beautiful imagery and sharp performances make Wild Tigers a memorable film from first-time director Cam Archer." On Metacritic, the film has a score of 52 based on 11 critics' reviews, indicating "mixed or average" reviews.

Stephen Holden of The New York Times praised the film, preferring the shortened version. Holden said the film captures "the moment at the dawn of adolescence when hormones and daydreams swirl into a heady fog of confusion and longing" and "achingly sympathizes with the desperate lengths an obsessed adolescent will go to in pursuit of love. As you watch the movie, you pray that, in the language of Tea and Sympathy, the future teachers of Logan’s life lessons will 'be kind.'" Wesley Morris of The Boston Globe similarly gave a positive review, noting the dearth of films that depict the space between childhood and the teen years. Morris wrote, "Archer has culled his sense memories and burgeoning talent (he's 24) into a maiden work of experimentalism: blackout editing transitions, ambient noise, digital video bits, superimpositions, moments of sloth. The avant-gardeness of it all might have been precious beyond belief...But Archer is not grasping at stylistic straws. He believes in the little world he's captured." Morris concluded, "Archer isn't necessarily taking us anywhere new, but his movie's rapture is beautiful inside and out." Dennis Harvey of Variety was less complementary, opining that while the film "operates at least as much in the realms of poetical reverie and metaphor as it does pubescent psychodrama," these combined elements make for a "frequently awkward mix."

=== Accolades ===
Cinematographer and frequent Archer collaborator, Aaron Platt, received a 2007 Independent Spirit Award nomination for his work on the film.

== Home media ==
The film was released on DVD on July 10, 2007, by Genius Entertainment, which went out of print when the company went defunct. There was also a European DVD-release issued by Soda Pictures and edited to an even shorter runtime of 78 minutes. On September 28, 2021, Altered Innocence released the film as a 15th anniversary-edition Blu-ray including a new director's cut which strikes a balance between the Sundance cut and the theatrical cut.
