= Anthem (N-Joi song) =

Single by N-Joi

from the album Music From A State Of Mind
- Released: 1990 ("Anthem"); 1996 ("The New Anthem")
- Recorded: 1989 (original); 1995 (new recordings)
- Genre: House
- Length: 4:20 (original EP version); 4:05 (album version)
- Label: Deconstruction; Logic; RCA
- Songwriters: Mark Franklin; Nigel Champion; [Beresford Romeo]; Darlene Davis; Elai Tubo; Sly Dunbar
- Producers: Mark Franklin; Nigel Champion; Mark Ryder

N-Joi singles chronology
"Anthem" (1990)	"Malfunction" (1990)
Bad Things (1995)	The New Anthem (1996)	Screeem! (Anthem '98) (1998)

Music video
- "Anthem" on YouTube

"Anthem" is a song by British electronic music group N-Joi, released by Deconstruction, Logic and RCA Records as a single from their debut EP "Music from a State of Mind" (1990). It was written by Mark Franklin and Nigel Champion in 1989 and featured in their early live sets. The piano-driven track has gone on to become one of the most famous signature songs in the act's career, as well as seeing it chart numerous times since its 1990 release.

== Background ==
The single and the accompanying music video (filmed in Shelleys Laserdome, Longton, Stoke-on-Trent) also features singer Saffron, who did the live performances for N-Joi (and whose career would take off after this track with Republica). "Anthem" features lyric samples from three songs: "Peanut Butter" (1983) by Gwen Guthrie ("I'm in love with you / Want you to love me too"); "I Found Love" (1985) by Darlene Davis ("True love can be hard to find"); and "Back to Life (However Do You Want Me)" (1989) by Soul II Soul (“Feel the music that’s in the air”). Because of this, the artists (and their writers) also receive credits on the single.

== Chart performance ==
The song charted on both the UK and US charts. It was originally released in 1990 as a 6 track promo on white label, before being sold on to Deconstruction, where it was released on the EP, Music from a State of Mind, reaching number 45 on the UK Top 75 in November 1990. Following much club play, "Anthem" was reissued in April 1991 reaching number eight on the UK Singles Chart. In the United States it had better success on the Billboard Hot Dance Club Play chart, where it made two trips to the top 5, reaching number four in 1991 with the original mixes, and again in 1996, where it was re-released with new remixes as "The New Anthem" (under the expanded credit "N-Joi featuring Mark Franklin and Nigel Champion"). The updated version would be their second number one in the US, following "Mindflux".

== Critical reception ==
Larry Flick from American magazine Billboard wrote, "After receiving attention stateside as an import, duo offers frenetic, sample-happy houser in mixes that should have been lengthened slightly, but will be warmly welcomed at numerous clubs regardless." In a 1996 review of new remixes, Flick commented, "A relic from the bygone techno era is freshened up with time-sensitive trance and house remixes by N-Joi, Spike, and the increasingly hot Richard "Humpty" Vission. Nearly every version wisely maintains the original track's mind-bending hook, which deserves to finally be heard on pop and crossover airwaves. Regardless of radio's reception, expect club DJs to embrace this still-shiny bauble with renewed passion."

In 1991, Peter Stanton from Record Mirror noted that "this bumping, thumping number is being given a second chance after their recent Adrenalin EP paved the way forward. Boys, it's spelt E-N-J-O-Y if you were having trouble." The magazine's James Hamilton described "Anthem" as a "slow then bounding piano jangled jaunty raver" and "another deservingly reissued floorfiller".

== Impact and legacy ==
In 1995, British DJ Sister Bliss selected "Anthem" as one of "the tracks that mean most to her", saying, "And what an anthem it is! Eclipse had them on every week, it seemed – they didn't seem to do PAs anywhere else. They had these farts dancing with their tits out. It was quite amusing. That whole EP is fantastic, it's the sound of the time but it doesn't date. It's a reliable classic. It's always the last tune of the night – people must be bored with me playing it. it reminds me of driving around the M25 looking for the rave and ending up in a field with 10,000 smelly people."

The original version of "Anthem" is featured in the 2013 video game Grand Theft Auto V and its accompanying soundtrack.

The song was featured in the clubbing movie Beats in 2019.

== Track listings ==
=== 1990 version ===
- 12", CD (UK)
1. "Anthem" (The Original Mix) – (4:05)
2. "Anthem" (The Mafia Mix) – (4:50)
3. "Anthem" (The Six Day Nightmare Mix) – (4:28)
4. "Malfunction" – (4:20)
- 12", CD (US)

A1: "Anthem" (N-Joi R Dub Mix) – (5:11)
A2: "Anthem" (N-Joi R Dance Mix) – (5:20)
A3: "Anthem" (N-Joi R Deepstrumental) – (4:07)
B1: "Anthem" (Distant Run Mix) – (4:15)
B2: "Anthem" (Original Mix Edit) – (4:20)

- 12", EP (US)

A1: "Anthem" (The Six Day Nightmare Mix) – (4:30)
A2: "Anthem" (The Mafia Mix) – (5:02)
B1: "Anthem" – (4:03)
B2: "Manic" – (2:37)
B3: "Techno Gangsters" – (3:33)

=== 1996 version ===
- 12", MCD (US)
1. "Anthem" (Spike Club Mix) – (7:55)
2. "Anthem" (Original Mix) – (4:03)
3. "Anthem" (Vission/Pete Lorimer Love Acid!) – (7:21)
4. "Anthem" (The Mafia Mix) – (5:02)
5. "Anthem" (The Six Day Nightmare Mix) – (4:30)

== Charts ==
=== Weekly charts ===
Anthem

Chart (1990–1991)	Peak position
Europe (Eurochart Hot 100)	28
Finland (Suomen virallinen lista)	24
Ireland (IRMA)	15
Israel (Israeli Singles Chart)	27
Luxembourg (Radio Luxembourg)	10
UK Singles (OCC)	8
UK Airplay (Music Week)	42
UK Dance (Music Week)	2
UK Club Chart (Record Mirror)	2
US Hot Dance Club Play (Billboard)	4

The New Anthem

Chart (1996)	Peak position
US Hot Dance Club Play (Billboard)	1

=== Year-end charts ===
Anthem

Chart (1990)	Position
UK Club Chart (Record Mirror)	81

Chart (1991)	Position
UK Club Chart (Record Mirror)	15
