= Fairuza Balk =

American actress (born 1974)

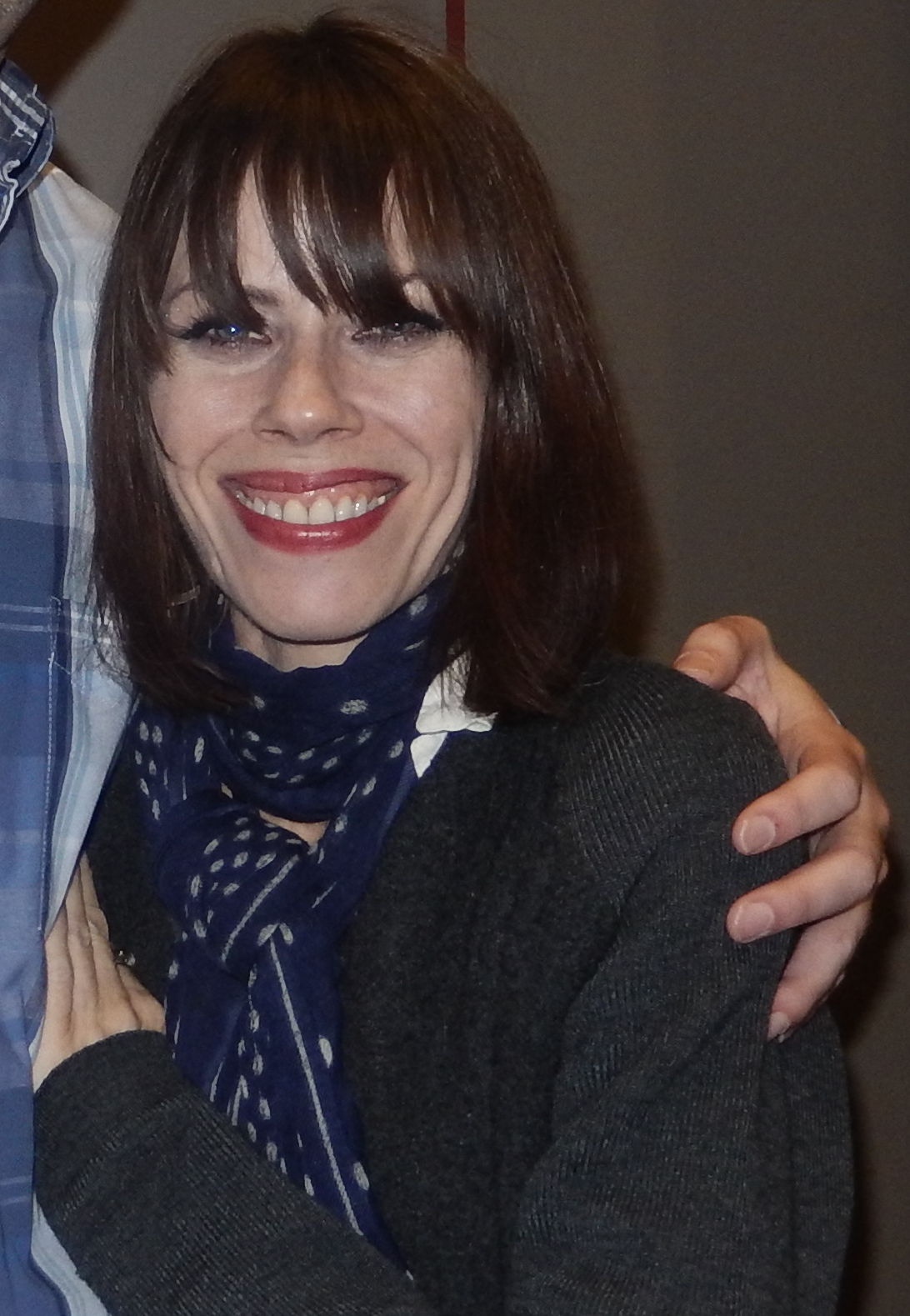
- Balk in 2019
- Born: May 21, 1974 (age 52); Point Reyes, California, U.S.
- Occupations: Actress; musician; visual artist
- Years active: 1983–present

Fairuza Balk (born May 21, 1974) is an American actress, musician, and visual artist. Known for her portrayals of distinctive characters—often with a dark edge and "goth-girl" persona—she has appeared in numerous independent films and blockbuster features.

Balk made her feature film debut as Dorothy Gale in Return to Oz (1985), for which she was nominated for a Saturn Award and a Young Artist Award. Her career progressed with parts in films such as Valmont (1989) and Gas Food Lodging (1992), the latter earning her an Independent Spirit Award for Best Female Lead. Balk received acclaim and a cult following for her portrayal of Nancy Downs in The Craft (1996). Her other credits include The Island of Dr. Moreau (1996), American History X (1998), The Waterboy (1998), Almost Famous (2000), Wild Tigers I Have Known (2006), and Bad Lieutenant: Port of Call New Orleans (2009).

On television, Balk portrayed Mildred Hubble in the 1986 adaptation of The Worst Witch, played the recurring role of Ginger on Showtime's Ray Donovan (2015), and starred as Lizzie Thomas in Amazon's Paradise City (2021). Balk has been releasing music since 2010 under the name of her unsigned act, Armed Love Militia.

== Early life ==
Balk was born on May 21, 1974, in Point Reyes, California, to Solomon Feldthouse (born David Earle Scaff; 1940–2021), a musician of part Blackfoot and part Cherokee descent, and Cathryn Balk (1944–2018), a belly dancer. The name Fairuza is of Persian origin meaning "turquoise". Her father gave her the name because of the color of her eyes. Feldthouse was one of the founding members of the 1960s psychedelic rock group Kaleidoscope, and was also a traveling folk musician.

Until the age of two, Balk lived in Jackson, Michigan, with her mother. They then moved to Vancouver, British Columbia, where she began acting at age six. They moved to London and then to Paris for another role. They remained there for six months before returning to Vancouver. Balk bought an occult shop called Panpipes in Los Angeles while filming the 1996 film The Craft.

== Career ==
Balk took her first acting course around the summer of 1983, where she was taught how to look at a camera and not be shy. Her first experience was in a British Columbia tourism commercial, for which she earned $100. Her debut role was in a 1983 television film titled The Best Christmas Pageant Ever. While in London, Balk was cast by Walt Disney Productions to star as Dorothy Gale in Return to Oz, the sequel to MGM's 1939 musical The Wizard of Oz. This role led to others, including that of Mildred Hubble in The Worst Witch. In 1988, at age 14, she moved to Paris to work on Valmont with Miloš Forman. She decided to take correspondence courses and went back to Hollywood, where she gained increasing notice as an actress. In 1992, she was awarded an Independent Spirit Award as best actress for her performance in the Allison Anders film Gas Food Lodging.

In 1996, she appeared in a lead role in The Craft, in which her character formed a teenage coven with characters portrayed by Neve Campbell, Rachel True and Robin Tunney. Since then, Balk has continued to find roles, primarily dark ones. In 1996, she co-starred in The Island of Dr Moreau. In 1998, she played a neo-Nazi opposite Edward Norton in American History X, and was featured in The Waterboy, alongside Adam Sandler. Since 2000, she has appeared in over a dozen films and was briefly in a band called G-13. She has also done voice work for animated films, TV shows and video games, including Justice League, Family Guy, Grand Theft Auto: Vice City and Lords of EverQuest. The 2007 documentary Return to Oz: The Joy That Got Away was dedicated to her.

In 2010, Armed Love Militia, Balk's musical outlet, released the single "Stormwinds". The track was written and sung by Balk. Armed Love Militia continued, with Balk collaborating on an EP with singer and songwriter Mel Sanson.

In 2011, Balk began to exhibit art in Los Angeles and New York. On August 4, 2012, she participated in the group show 'MiXTAPE', with other notable artists Mark Ryden, Camille Rose Garcia, Jessicka Addams, and Marion Peck. Artists were asked to pick a song and create art inspired by that song. Balk chose the song "Nuages" by Django Reinhardt and created a 16"x20"x12" mixed-media sculpture. The eclectic mix of songs chosen were featured for digital download on iTunes.

== Filmography ==
Film
| Year | Title | Role | Notes |
|---|---|---|---|
| 1985 | Return to Oz | Dorothy Gale | Nominated – Saturn Award for Best Performance by a Younger Actor |
| 1986 | Discovery | Molly | Short film |
| 1988 | The Outside Chance of Maximilian Glick | Celia Brzjinski | |
| 1989 | Valmont | Cecile | |
| 1992 | Gas Food Lodging | Shade | Independent Spirit Award for Best Female Lead |
| 1994 | Imaginary Crimes | Sonya Weiler | |
| 1994 | Tollbooth | Doris | |
| 1995 | Things to Do in Denver When You're Dead | Lucinda | |
| 1996 | The Craft | Nancy Downs | MTV Movie Award for Best Fight (shared with Robin Tunney); Nominated – Saturn Award for Best Supporting Actress |
| 1996 | The Island of Dr. Moreau | Aissa | |
| 1997 | American Perfekt | Alice Thomas | |
| 1997 | The Maker | Bella Sotto | |
| 1998 | There's No Fish Food in Heaven | Mona | |
| 1998 | American History X | Stacey | |
| 1998 | The Waterboy | Vicki Vallencourt | |
| 2000 | Red Letters | Gretchen Van Buren | |
| 2000 | Almost Famous | Sapphire | Online Film Critics Society Award for Best Ensemble (shared with State and Main); Nominated – Screen Actors Guild Award for Outstanding Performance by a Cast in a Motion Picture |
| 2002 | Personal Velocity: Three Portraits | Paula | |
| 2002 | Deuces Wild | Annie 'The Ice Cube' | |
| 2005 | What Is It? | Screaming Snail, Insect, Monkey Girl | Voice |
| 2005 | Don't Come Knocking | Amber | |
| 2005 | A Year and a Day | Lola | |
| 2006 | Wild Tigers I Have Known | Logan's Mom | |
| 2008 | Humboldt County | Bogart | |
| 2008 | Grindstone Road | Hannah | |
| 2009 | Bad Lieutenant: Port of Call New Orleans | Officer Heidi | |
| 2010 | Shit Year | Message Voice | Voice |
| 2013 | Dose of Reality | Rose | |
| 2014 | Beyond Clueless | Narrator | Voice, documentary film |
| 2014 | Lost Soul | Herself | Documentary film |
| 2015 | Battle Scars | Rifka | |
| 2017 | August Falls | Anna Ellison | |
| 2018 | Hell Is Where the Home Is | The Visitor | |
| 2020 | The Craft: Legacy | Nancy Downs | Cameo |
| 2023 | The Skull: A Tyrolean Folktale | Narrator | Voice, short film |

Television
| Year | Title | Role | Notes |
|---|---|---|---|
| 1983 | The Best Christmas Pageant Ever | Beth Bradley | Television film |
| 1985 | Deceptions | Penny Roberts | Television film |
| 1986 | The Worst Witch | Mildred Hubble | Television film |
| 1987 | Poor Little Rich Girl: The Barbara Hutton Story | Barbara—Age 12 | Television film |
| 1991 | Deadly Intentions... Again? | Stacey | Television film |
| 1992 | Shame | Lizzie Curtis | Television film |
| 1992 | The Danger of Love: The Carolyn Warmus Story | Lisa | Television film |
| 1993 | Murder in the Heartland | Caril Ann Fugate | 2 episodes |
| 1994 | ZZ Top: Breakaway | Vampire Girl | Television film |
| 1995 | Shadow of a Doubt | Angel Harwell | Television film |
| 1999–2000 | Family Guy | Connie D'Amico | Voice, 2 episodes |
| 2001 | The Sopranos | Agent Deborah Ciccerone | Episode: "Army of One" (original airing only) |
| 2003 | Justice League | Penny Dee | Voice, episode: "Only a Dream" |
| 2006 | Orpheus | Karen | Unaired pilot |
| 2006 | Masters of Horror | Stacia | Episode: "Pick Me Up" |
| 2011–2012 | Celebrity Ghost Stories | Herself | 3 episodes |
| 2015 | Ray Donovan | Ginger | 7 episodes |
| 2021 | Paradise City | Lizzie Thomas | 8 episodes |
| 2022 | Close Enough | Roxy | Voice, episode: "Halloween Enough" |

Video games
| Year | Title | Voice role |
|---|---|---|
| 2002 | Grand Theft Auto: Vice City | Mercedes Cortez |
| 2003 | Lords of EverQuest | Lady T'Lak |
