= Drop Dead Gorgeous (song) =

1996 song by Republica

Single by Republica

from the album Republica
- B-side: "Out of This World" (Chemical Brothers Dub on CD1 version, Chemical Brothers Mix on CD2 version); "Mutha" (CD2 version); "Bitch" (Way Out West Mix) (CD2 version); "Holly" (Full Mix) (CD2 version)
- Released: January 1997 (US); April 1997 (UK)
- Genre: Dance-rock; alternative rock
- Length: 3:32
- Label: Deconstruction
- Songwriters: Saffron; Tim Dorney; Andy Todd; Johnny Male
- Producers: Republica; Ben Grosse

single singles chronology
"Ready to Go" (1996)	"Drop Dead Gorgeous" (1997)	"From Rush Hour with Love" (1998)

Music video
- "Drop Dead Gorgeous" on YouTube

"Drop Dead Gorgeous" is a song by English alternative rock band Republica. Released in 1996 on their self-titled debut album and in 1997 by Deconstruction Records as the album's third and final single from the album, it was as a commercial success, giving the group their only top 10 hit to date in the UK. The single elicited a positive critical reaction, and was also a minor hit in the US, New Zealand, Israel and Germany. The music video, which went into rotation on MTV, was nominated for "Best Video" at the 1998 Brit Awards.

== Reception ==
=== Critical ===
The song was praised upon its release. AllMusic's Stephen Thomas Erlewine praised the song as one of its parent album's highlights, and felt that the song has a "bright, energetic sound that is quite infectious."

=== Commercial ===
The song was a success in the United Kingdom and United States. In the UK, the song gave the group their only top-10 hit to date. The single debuted at number 7 on the UK Singles Chart on the week beginning 3 May 1997; the single spent a total of seven consecutive weeks on the chart, more than any other song by the group. The song was also successful in the US, entering the Billboard Hot 100 and peaking at number 93, spending a total of three weeks on the chart. The single also entered the Billboard Modern Rock Tracks chart, where it entered the top 40 and peaked at number 39. Elsewhere, "Drop Dead Gorgeous" peaked at number 30 in New Zealand and number 90 in Germany.

== Music video ==
The song's music video was nominated for "Best Video" at the 1998 Brit Awards. It also went into rotation on MTV.

== In media ==
The song appears on the soundtracks of the TV shows Doctors, My Mad Fat Diary, Who's Doing the Dishes?, and Clueless. It also appears in the film Scream.

== Legacy ==
The song was included on Official Charts' list of "20 Classic Hits Turning 20 Years Old in 2017," with writer Justin Myers noting that both "Ready to Go" and "Drop Dead Gorgeous" "still get played on ads or on TV pretty often."

== Track listing ==
All tracks are written by Saffron, Tim Dorney, and Andy Todd, with co-writing on "Drop Dead Gorgeous" by Johnny Male.

CD1 CD and digital maxi single
No.	Title	Length
1.	"Drop Dead Gorgeous" (Radio Edit)	3:31
2.	"Drop Dead Gorgeous" (Pop Fiction Mix)	3:41
3.	"Out of This World" (Chemical Brothers Dub)	5:22
4.	"Bitch" (Way Out West Mix)	6:19
Total length:		18:53

CD2 CD and digital maxi single
No.	Title	Length
1.	"Drop Dead Gorgeous" (Radio Edit)	3:31
2.	"Out of This World" (Chemical Brothers Mix)	7:05
3.	"Mutha"	3:59
4.	"Holly" (Full Mix)	7:05
Total length:		21:40

- Track lengths on the digital version of CD1: "Drop Dead Gorgeous" (Radio Edit) is 3:30. Total length of maxi single is 18:52.
- Track lengths on the digital version of CD2: "Drop Dead Gorgeous" (Radio Edit) is 3:30, "Mutha" is 4:00, and "Holly" (Full Mix) is 7:07. Total length of maxi single is 21:42.

== Personnel ==
Adapted from AllMusic.

- Donald Christie – photography
- Ben Grosse – mixing, production, programming
- Randy Jacobs – guitar
- Saffron – vocals
- Michael Tuller – programming
- John Vitale – guitar, programming
- Jez Williams – guitar

== Charts ==
Chart performance for "Drop Dead Gorgeous"
Chart (1997)	Peak position
Australia (ARIA)	131
Europe (Eurochart Hot 100)	51
Germany (GfK)	90
Israel (Israeli Singles Chart)	13
New Zealand (Recorded Music NZ)	30
Scottish Singles Sales (Official Charts)	8
UK Singles (Official Charts)	7
US Billboard Hot 100	93
US Alternative Airplay (Billboard)	39

=== Year-end charts ===
1997 year-end chart performance for "Drop Dead Gorgeous"
Chart (1997)	Position
UK Singles (OCC)	157
