= N-Joi =

English electronic music duo

- Origin: Southend-on-Sea, Essex, England
- Genres: Electronic; house; techno; rave
- Years active: 1989–1998; 2002–present
- Labels: Deconstruction; RCA; Logic
- Members: Mark Franklin; Nigel Champion; Saffron

N-Joi are an English production duo from Southend-on-Sea, Essex, England, consisting of Nigel Champion and Mark Franklin, (who met at Alleyn Court Prep School) with vocalist/front person Saffron. Champion went to Framlingham College and Franklin to Felsted School but met up again after school in 1987.

== Biography ==
Between 1991 and 1996, they entered the U.S. Billboard Hot Dance Club Play chart five times, all of them hitting the top 10. Two of the songs went to number one: "Mindflux" in 1992 and "The New Anthem" in 1996, which was a new version of their debut single "Anthem," itself a top five dance hit from 1991. In 2006 they returned to the top of the Official UK Dance Chart with a set of remixes of their biggest hit "Anthem".

== Discography ==
=== Chart singles ===
Title	Release date	UK	AUS	IRE	US Dance
"Anthem"	1990	45	—	—	—
Adrenalin EP	1991	23	134	—	—
"Anthem" (reissue)	1991	8	141	15	4
"Malfunction" (US only)	1991	—	—	—	5
"Mindflux" (US only)	1991	—	—	—	1
"Live in Manchester (Parts 1 + 2)"	1992	12	170	25	—
The Drumstruck EP	1993	33	176	—	—
"Papillon"	1994	70	—	—	—
"Bad Things" (credited to 'NJOI')	1995	57	—	—	7
"The New Anthem" (credited as 'N-Joi featuring Mark Franklin and Nigel Champion') (US only)	1996	—	—	—	1
"Screeem! (Anthem '98)" (credited as 'N-Joi versus Tact')	1998	91	—	—	—

== See also ==
- Republica
- List of number-one dance hits (United States)
- List of artists who reached number one on the US Dance chart
