= Aaron Platt =

American cinematographer and film director

- Born: June 9, 1981 (age 44)
- Occupations: Film director Director of photography
- Years active: 2002 - present

Aaron Platt (born June 9, 1981) is an American film director and cinematographer. He previously resided in Venice, California, and Brooklyn, New York. He currently resides in Seattle with his wife, Karissa Hochberg, a wardrobe stylist.

Platt has worked steadily as a director/cinematographer since 2002, with prolific work spanning television commercials, feature films, and music videos.

Platt is a frequent collaborator with independent film director Cam Archer. His work on Archer's feature film debut, Wild Tigers I Have Known, which premiered at the 2006 Sundance Film Festival, earned him a Best Cinematography nomination at the 2007 Independent Spirit Awards. In 2008, Platt photographed Archer's second feature film, Shit Year, a black and white film which premiered at the 2010 Cannes Film Festival, as part of their Directors' Fortnight program, not released theatrically until the fall of 2011.

Platt has directed numerous music videos, starting with his first video in 2004 for "Haunts Me" by Kelli Scarr. From there, Platt went on to direct music videos for artists including Kanye West, Justin Timberlake, U2, Melody Gardot, Nicole Scherzinger, and Pitbull, among many others. At the age of 24, his video for the OneRepublic song "Apologize" became a major sensation on YouTube. As of June 1, 2014, Platt's video, which features the original version of "Apologize", has garnered nearly 49,000,000 views. His video was also used unofficially to feature the remix of "Apologize" in a new video, which has garnered over 100,000,000 views, and is listed as YouTube's seventh most watched video of all-time. In 2016, Platt was a credited Director of Photography on the Beyoncé film Lemonade.

Platt's commercial clients include Instagram, Apple, Alexander Wang, Mercedes-Benz, Adidas, Range Rover, Tom Ford, Bloomingdale's, Verizon, Gap, Inc., ALDO Group, Garnier, Spike TV, and Nintendo, among many others.

== Awards and nominations ==
- PLUS Camerimage "Best Cinematography", 2009 Nomination for Coldplay's "Strawberry Swing"
- American Cinematographer, 2009 Article for The Maine "Into Your Arms" music video
- SHOOT magazine "New Directors Showcase", 2009 Selected Director for The Gliteratti's "Keep Me Up All Night"
- Nominated Best Cinematography - 2007 Independent Spirit Awards for Wild Tigers I Have Known.
- Won Best Cinematography - 2007 Sacramento International Film Festival for The Pacific and Eddy.
- Won Most Promising Filmmaker - 2004 Ann Arbor Film Festival for The Cold Ones.

== Filmography ==
=== Cinematography ===
- Happiness Runs (2010)
- Shit Year (2010)
- Junction (2008)
- The Red Canvas (2008)
- The China Project (2008)
- The Lodge (2008)
- Serpent and the Sun: Tales of an Aztec Apprentice (2008)
- "Making the Cut" (4 episodes, 2007)
  - Giving Back (2007) TV episode (director of photography)
  - Tension of School (2007) TV episode
  - Senior Soiree (2007) TV episode (director of photography)
  - Welcome to Vidal Sassoon (2007) TV episode (director of photography)
- The Pacific and Eddy (2007)
- Lords of the Underworld (2007)
- The Grass Grows Green (2007)
- Rolling (2007)
- Time and Tide (2006)
- "7 Deadly Hollywood Sins" (4 episodes, 2006)
  - Pride (2006) TV episode (intro sequence)
  - Lust (2006) TV episode (intro sequence)
  - Envy (2006) TV episode (intro sequence)
  - Gluttony (2006) TV episode (intro sequence)
- "Fast Inc." (2006) TV series (unknown episodes)
- Wild Tigers I Have Known (2006)
- Hooligan's Valley (2005)
- American Fame Pt. 2: Forgetting Jonathan Brandis (2005)
- Godly Boyish (2004)
- American Fame Pt. 1: Drowning River Phoenix (2004)
- The Cold Ones (2004)
- Bobby-crush (2003)

=== Music videos ===
- Melody Gardot - "Mira" (2012)
- Reeve Carney featuring Bono and The Edge - "Rise Above 1" (2011)
- Nicole Scherzinger - "Try with Me" (2011)
- Kris Allen - "The Truth" (2010)
- Keri Hilson - "I Like" (2009)
- Meg & Dia - "Black Wedding" (2009)
- Melody Gardot - "Baby I'm a Fool" (2009)
- Ryan Leslie - "Addiction" (2008)
- The Glitterati - "Keep Me Up All Night" (2008)
- Queens of the Stone Age - "Sick Sick Sick"
- Mumm-Ra - "She's Got You High"
- Six Organs of Admittance - "Shelter From The Ash" (2007)
- Sarabeth Tucek - "Something For You" (2007)
- Smugg Juggler - "This Is It" (2007)
- OneRepublic - "Apologize" (2006)
- Kelli Scarr - "Haunts Me" (2004)
- The Maine - "Into Your Arms" (2009)

=== Commercials ===
- Feniderma Aftersun - "Touching"
- WII Table Tennis - "'The Match"
- State Farm Insurance - "Winner's Circle"
- AAA - "Found Money"
- Finesse - "Discovery"
- Kohler - "Bold Look"

=== Writer/Cinematographer/Director ===
- The Cold Ones (2004)
