= Mel Sanson =

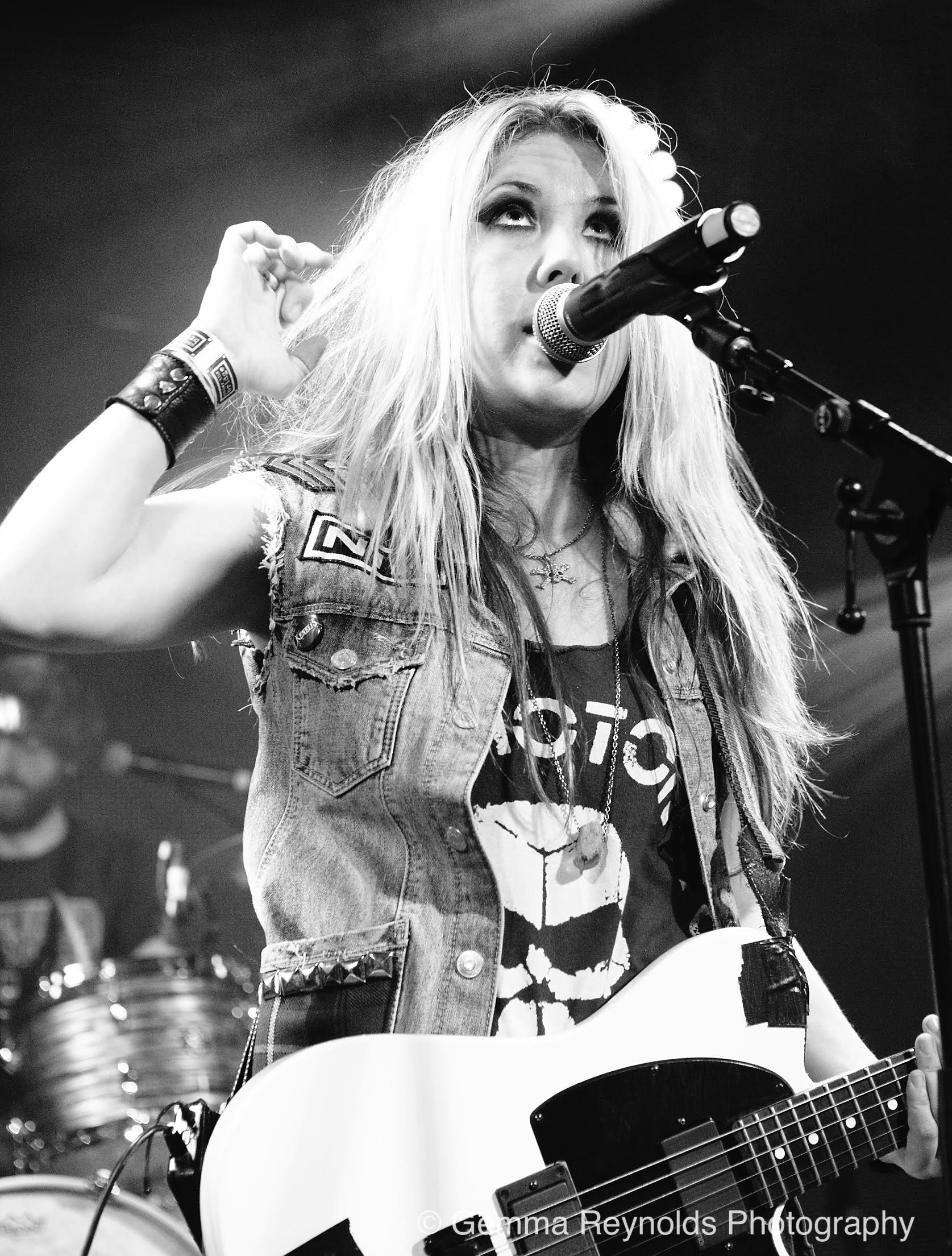

Background information
- Born: Melanie Anne Sanson; 28 July 1979 (age 46); Chertsey, Surrey, England
- Genres: Alternative, grunge, rock, punk, post-hardcore, slowcore
- Occupation(s): Musician, singer and songwriter
- Instrument(s): Vocals, guitar, bass, keyboard, drums, percussion
- Years active: 2005 – present (musician)
- Website: http://www.melsanson.com

Mel Sanson (born 28 July 1979) is an English singer-songwriter most notable for performing lead vocals and guitar with rock band Kenelis and Murder Ballad duet "White Lillies" with Fairuza Balk.

== Early life and career ==
Sanson was born in Chertsey, Surrey, England and finished her high school years in Camberley, Surrey.

=== Kenelis ===
In 2008, Sanson and her band members performed with Ghost of a Thousand & Fightstar at Guilfest's 2008's Rocksound Cave. In January 2009 the band released their first album Remember How It Felt, produced by Angus Cowan. In 2010, the band played numerous Pride stages all over the UK including Brighton Pride, Cardiff Mardi Gras, Birmingham Pride, Sheffield Pride, Nottingham Pride and Suffolk Pride. In 2011 Sanson moved to Brighton, and in 2012 the new Kenelis EP MOVE was released on Sanson's own label, Sanson Records. Produced by Chris Coulter. Shows included Indigo2 at The O2, Greenwich, Ep track 'GFY' on Balcony TV in the summer followed by the band's EP launch at The 100 Club. Kenelis continued to perform regular shows on the London Underground scene as well as continuing to play Pride and festival stages including supporting Arcane Roots and Soulfly at Guilfest Big Cheese Cave, until their final shows at Brighton and Hove Pride and Under The Bridge supporting Republica. In 2013 Kenelis won Brighton Music Award – Viewers Choice where Sanson met lead singer of Republica, Saffron Sprackling.

=== LGBTQ+ activism ===
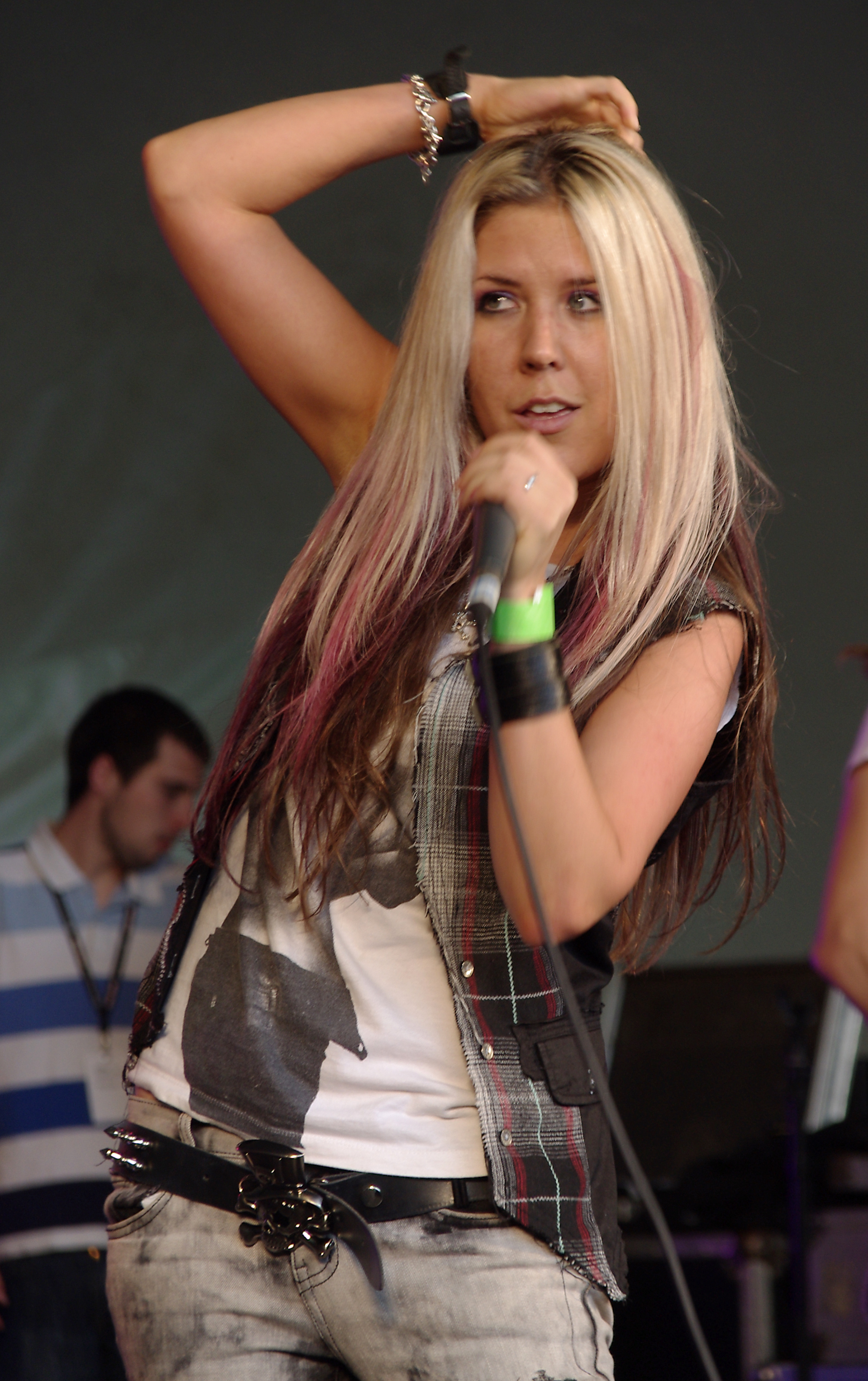
Mel Sanson at Cardiff Mardi Gras in September 2010

In 2012 Sanson appeared on the 2012 charity single 'It Does Get Better' created by The L Project. The single benefitted LGBTQ charities and was written in response to the suicide of LGBTQ teenagers.‘It Does Get Better’ not only had chart success but won Outstanding contribution to the LGBTQ Community – 2012. Sanson volunteered to be the Artist Liaison and Promoter for live music stages at Brighton and Hove Pride 2012, Brighton and Hove Pride 2013 and Brighton and Hove Pride 2014.

=== Auxesis ===
The band began in 2016 when singer-songwriter Sanson Sanson started writing songs with lead guitarist Jack Rowan. Alec Greaves joined the band on drums and the three-piece went into the studio with Mark Roberts and recorded their debut EP, Swallow The Sun. Shows included The Cowley Club, The Quadrant, Sticky Mike's Frog Bar in Brighton and The Black Heart in London. In September 2017 the band performed their final show at the Prince Albert in Brighton.

=== Armed Love Militia ===
In 2017 Sanson starting writing dark melancholic grungy folk songs. Later, Fairuza Balk invited Sanson to be part of Armed Love Militia music collaboration project. Fairuza sent Sanson an Appalachian folk/murder ballad style song called White Lilies and thought it would sound really great with some harmonies. Sanson recorded the track with Fairuza live in one take in downtown LA.

== Discography ==
- Nobody See's Me (But You) – Single 2007
- Drained – Single – 2008
- Remember How It Felt – Album 2009
- Jealous – Single 2011
- Fake – Album 2011
- Move – EP 2012
- Ghost – Single – 2018
- The L Project – It Does Get Better 2012 – single
- Armed Love Militia – White Lilles with Fairuza Balk 2021 – EP lead track
