= Cam Archer =

American photographer and filmmaker

Cam Archer (born 1981) is an American independent filmmaker, photographer and sound designer, currently residing in Santa Cruz, California.

== Career ==
Archer's first success was with his 2003 student produced short film, bobbycrush, about a young boy's unrequited love for his best friend. The film premiered at the 2004 Sundance Film Festival, received a Student Academy Award nomination that same year and inspired much of Archer's future work.

After being work-shopped at the 2005 Sundance Screenwriter's Lab, Archer's first feature film, Wild Tigers I Have Known, premiered at the 2006 Sundance Film Festival and went on to be distributed theatrically in 2007 by IFC Films. The film follows 13-year-old Logan (Malcolm Stumpf), as he comes to terms with his sexual identity, the hell of middle school, wild mountain lions and life with his single mother (Fairuza Balk). Cinematographer and frequent Archer collaborator, Aaron Platt, received a 2007 Independent Spirit Award nomination for his work on the film. Gus Van Sant and Scott Rudin were executive producers on the project.

Archer's second feature film, Shit Year, premiered at the 2010 Cannes Film Festival, as part of their Directors' Fortnight program. The black and white film follows actress Colleen West (Ellen Barkin), as she is forced to reexamine her career, her psychological well being and a recent, failed romantic relationship. The film was released theatrically in the fall of 2011 and on home video in the fall of 2012.

Between features, Archer has also directed numerous short films and music videos, including collaborations with Current 93, Emily Jane White, Imperial Teen, Joan Jett, Julianna Barwick, Lydia Lunch, Mick Turner, Peaking Lights, Sarabeth Tucek, Six Organs of Admittance, Xiu Xiu, and Zero 7.

Archer's photographs have appeared in several publications, including Nylon, Tokion, and Rolling Stone, among others.

In 2012, Archer was awarded a Creative Capital grant to develop a yet-to-be-released (as of 2016) feature-length documentary, tentatively entitled Practical Life.

== Filmography ==
Archer has written and directed his two feature films and all his short films, also editing and producing his first six works.

- Their Houses (2011) (short)
- Shit Year (2010)
- The Dead Letters:
  - I Hate You For Leaving (2010)
  - Light Dark (2009)
  - Above Below (2008)
- Images For Billie Joe McAllister (2006) (short)
- Wild Tigers I Have Known (2006)
- American Fame Pt. 2: Forgetting Jonathan Brandis (2005) (short)
- Godly Boyish (2004) (short)
- American Fame Pt. 1: Drowning River Phoenix (2004) (short)
- bobbycrush (2003) (short)
- The Sad Ones (2002) (short)
