= Emily Jane White =

American singer-songwriter

- Born: Emily Jane White
- Genres: Indie rock; Indie pop; Folk rock; Post-rock; Sadcore; Neofolk
- Occupations: Singer-songwriter, musician
- Instruments: Vocals, guitar, piano
- Years active: 2006–present
- Labels: Talitres; Milan Records; Important Records; Double Negative Records; Saint Rose Records
- Website: emilyjanewhite.net

Emily Jane White (born June 23, 1981) is an American singer and songwriter. Active as a solo artist since 2003, White has released seven solo albums and tours internationally.

== Early life ==
White was raised in Fort Bragg, California. White's father worked as a Merchant Marine out of the Port of Oakland, and her mother was a special education teacher for the Mendocino Unified School District.

White began to play music at age 5, but didn't enjoy the linear approach to piano lessons and preferred improvisation and playing by ear. At the age of 12 her father taught her chords on the guitar. At the age of 16 she began writing her first songs.

== Education ==
In 2003, White graduated with a degree in American Studies (Women and Gender Studies pathway) from UC–Santa Cruz. White's first musical explorations came as a member of punk and metal bands in college. She later branched off with her own group called Diamond Star Halos.

== Career ==
After college and spending time in Bordeaux, France, White moved to San Francisco to perform in 2006.

2007-2009: Dark Undercoat

On November 2, 2007, White released her first album, Dark Undercoat, through Double Negative Records. It was released on Talitres in Europe and as a vinyl LP in 2008 by Saint Rose Records. It included the song "Wild Tigers I Have Known", the title track of the Cam Archer film of the same name. Archer would later direct a number of videos for the album. She later described the album as "really basic, it sounds like demos". For live performances, White was supported by Jen Grady and Carey Lamprecht on strings.

2009 - 2010: Victorian America

White's second album, entitled Victorian America, was released in October 2009 in Europe on Talitres, and on April 27, 2010, in the U.S. by Milan Records. It was recorded in San Francisco and Oakland. White had written a number of songs that she worked on with her band for "basically a year and a half before we went and recorded". Compared to her debut, she described it as "more of an ambitious record". The song "Liza" appeared on digital streaming platforms prior to the US release.

2010 - 2011: Ode to Sentience

White's third album is entitled Ode to Sentience. The first single, "Requiem Waltz", first appeared on American Songwriter.

White appears on the song "Seeds" on Lonely Drifter Karen's 2010 album Fall of Spring.

2013 - 2015: Blood / Lines

In December 2013, White released Blood/Lines that included a contribution by Marissa Nadler. It was described as "a new stylistic development in her repertoire" and having a "neo-gothic feel".

2016: They Moved in Shadow All Together

In June 2016 the release of the new album was confirmed and preceded by the single "Frozen Garden". In July 2016, White released her fifth album They Moved in Shadow All Together that was described as "bringing her concern for race and gender equality to the fore of her poetic folk-pop". The album was recorded over a two-year period at the Tiny Telephone Studios in San Francisco, and mixed by Mark Willsher at Pin3hot.

2019 - 2020: Immanent Fire

Immanent Fire, White's sixth album, was released in November 2019 after being written over a period of two years. Major lyrical themes on the record include environmental collapse, capitalism and patriarchy. White co-produced the album with Anton Patzner, who also engineered and provided arrangements.

In 2022, White's 2007 song "Hole in the Middle" was featured in the menu screen for the video game As Dusk Falls.

2022 - 2023: Alluvion

== Style ==
White explained her interest in "the shadow side of life" by stating that "you can unveil and sort of reveal…subtleties and nuances and undercurrents of things that are existing but no one wants to talk about". The song "The Black Dove" was inspired by the Black Lives Matter movement. White noted that "As a white person, there are so many misconceptions to what racism is, but the fact that you can turn a blind eye to issues of racial brutality is a symptom of being white". Her literary inspirations are often cited to be Cormac McCarthy, Emily Brontë, Edna St. Vincent Millay and Edgar Allan Poe.

== Discography ==
=== Albums ===
Year	Album	Peak positions	Certification
Year	Album	FR	Certification
2007	Dark Undercoat	143	
2009	Victorian America	113	
2010	Ode to Sentience	112	
2013	Blood / Lines		
2016	They Moved in Shadow All Together		
2019	Immanent Fire		
2022	Alluvion		

=== Singles ===
Year	Single	Peak positions	Album
Year	Single	FR	Album
2013	"Keeley"	196	
