= Shit Year =

- Film poster
- Directed by: Cam Archer
- Written by: Cam Archer
- Produced by: Lars Knudsen; Jay Van Hoy
- Starring: Ellen Barkin
- Cinematography: Aaron Platt
- Edited by: Madeleine Riley
- Music by: Mick Turner
- Production companies: Parts and Labor; Wild Invention
- Distributed by: Cinemad Presents
- Release date: May 15, 2010 (Cannes)
- Running time: 95 minutes
- Country: United States
- Language: English

Shit Year is a 2010 American experimental drama film written and directed by Cam Archer and starring Ellen Barkin. The film was screened at the Directors' Fortnight event of the 2010 Cannes Film Festival.

== Plot ==
After a successful career, actress Colleen West (Ellen Barkin) decides to retire and return to a life without so much adventure in a peaceful place. It is when a large building is installed in the vicinity and breaks the calm of the place. Mrs. West, then, realizes that the serenity of before all that would not return and that her life, in reality, was an entire stage, where everything and everyone were full interpretations. Seized by dissatisfaction, Colleen begins to feel as if she has lived her life through her characters staged on stages and on screens.

== Cast ==
- Ellen Barkin as Colleen West
- Luke Grimes as Harvey West
- Bob Einstein as Rick
- Theresa Randle as Marion
- Melora Walters as Shelly
- Rickie Lee Jones as The Narrator

== Production ==
According to Archer, the film was shot in Los Angeles, with additional reshoots in Santa Cruz, California.

== Reception ==
The film has a 33% rating on Rotten Tomatoes. Glenn Heath Jr. of Slant Magazine awarded the film three stars out of four.

Eric Kohn of IndieWire gave the film a mixed review but praised Barkin's performance. Jay Weissberg of Variety gave a positive review and wrote that the film "stays engrossing thanks not only to Barkin’s strengths but also Archer’s compositional eye."
