= Ode to Sentience =

- Talitres Records release cover

Studio album by Emily Jane White
- Released: November 8, 2010; October 23, 2011; June 12, 2012
- Genre: Neofolk, alternative rock, indie rock
- Length: 45:34
- Label: Talitres Records; JABUP Records; Antenna Farm Records
- Producer: Emily Jane White, Ross Harris

Emily Jane White chronology
Victorian America (2009)	Ode to Sentience (2010)

Alternative cover
- Antenna Farm Records release cover

Ode to Sentience is the third studio album by Emily Jane White. It was released on November 8, 2010 by Talitres Records in France, on October 23, 2011 by JABUP Records in Japan, and on June 12, 2012 by Antenna Farm Records in United States.

== Reception ==
Professional ratings
Aggregate scores
Source	Rating
Metacritic	65/100
Review scores
Source	Rating
Allmusic	3.5/5 stars
American Songwriter	3/5 stars
Consequence of Sound	3/5 stars
PopMatters	6/10
Prefix Magazine	6.5/10
Verbicide Magazine	favorable

Metacritic cited a score of 65 out of 100, generally favorable reviews based on 5 reviews.

== Track listing ==
No.	Title	Length
1.	"Oh, Katherine"	4:23
2.	"The Cliff"	3:38
3.	"Black Silk"	4:16
4.	"The Black Oak"	3:02
5.	"I Lay to Rest (California)"	5:32
6.	"Clipped Wings"	5:22
7.	"The Preacher"	3:59
8.	"The Law"	3:51
9.	"Requiem Waltz"	4:08
10.	"Broken Words"	3:10
11.	"Silhouette" (Japanese edition and 2012 release)	4:13
Total length:		45:34

== Personnel ==
- Emily Jane White – producing, mixing, vocals, guitar, piano, organ
- Henry Nagle – guitars
- James Finch Jr – bass
- Ross Harris – drums, engineering, mixing, producing
- Jen Grady – cello, vocals
- Carey Lamprecht – violin
- Stephen Jarvis – audio consultan
- John Greenham – engineering, mastering

== Charts ==
Chart (2010)	Peak position
French SNEP Albums Chart	112

== Release history ==
Region	Date	Label	Format	Catalog
France	November 8, 2010	Talitres Records	CD	TAL056
France	November 8, 2010	Talitres Records	LP	TAL056LP
Japan	October 23, 2011	JABUP Records	CD	JUR-2
United States	June 12, 2012	Antenna Farm Records	CD	ANT539
