= Mindflux =

Single by N-Joi

from the album Adrenalin (1990 EP)
- Released: 1991
- Recorded: 1991
- Length: 6:41
- Label: Deconstruction Records/Logic/RCA
- Songwriters: Nigel Champion, Mark Franklin
- Producers: Mark Franklin, Nigel Champion

N-Joi singles chronology
"Malfunction" (1991)	"Mindflux" (1991)	"Live In Manchester (Part 1& 2)" (1991)

"Mindflux" is a song by British electronic music group N-Joi, released in 1991. The single, despite being released in the United Kingdom, only charted in the United States on Billboard's Hot Dance Club Play chart, reaching number one in 1992, giving the act its first of two number ones on this chart, the other coming from the act's first hit, 1990's "Anthem", which was re-released in 1996 as "The New Anthem". The music video for the single, in which the duo are performing in a concert, featured singer/actress Saffron and a male both dancing on stage.

"Mindflux" was used in music intros for BET's Video Vibrations in the United States from 1992 to 1997.

== Track listing ==
- 12", CD (US)
- "Mindflux" (6:41)
- "Malfunction" (4:20)
- "Phoenix" (4:49)
- "Rhythm Zone" (5:27)

== Charts ==
Chart (1991–1992)	Peak position
UK Dance (Music Week)	49
US Hot Dance Club Play (Billboard)	1
US Hot Dance Singles Sales (Billboard)	18
