= Saffron (singer) =

English singer, songwriter and actress (born 1968)

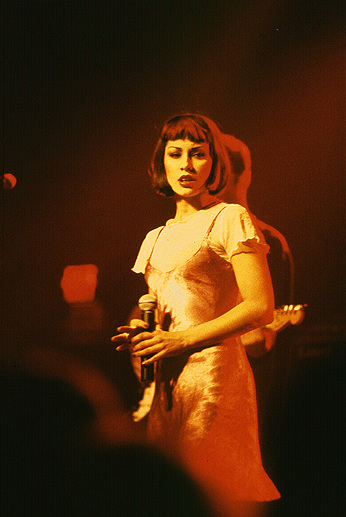
- Saffron performing with Republica in San Antonio, Texas in 1996

Background information
- Also known as: Saffron
- Born: Samantha Marie Sprackling; 3 June 1968 (age 58); Lagos, Nigeria
- Genres: Alternative rock; electronic
- Occupations: Singer; songwriter; actress
- Instruments: Vocals; tambourine; guitar
- Years active: 1989–present
- Member of: Republica

Samantha Marie Sprackling (born 3 June 1968), known professionally as Saffron, is an English singer, songwriter and actress. The lead singer of pop-rock band Republica, she also performs solo and appeared in London stage musical Starlight Express for two years.

== Early life and career ==
Samantha Sprackling was born in Lagos, Nigeria, to an English father and a Portuguese mother of part-Chinese ancestry. She grew up in Brixton, south London, England. When she was 18, Sprackling successfully auditioned for Arlene Phillips, which got her a part in the musical Starlight Express.

Saffron was the live on-stage vocalist of N-Joi's 1990 hit Anthem and appeared as a dancer in the video for their single "Mindflux". She appeared in the music video for the Chesney Hawkes 1991 hit "The One and Only." Saffron then had a brief career as a solo artist. One of her singles, a cover of Atlantic Starr's "Circles", charted at #60 in the UK in 1993.

== Republica ==
Sprackling had met Republica keyboard players Tim Dorney and Andy Todd by 1994, and they started writing songs after recruiting a guitarist and drummer. Republica released two albums and disbanded in 2001 after their record label, Deconstruction Records, collapsed.

In 2010, Republica reformed and released a re-recording of their 1996 hit "Ready to Go" on 7 June. During early October and November 2014, Republica toured the United Kingdom in support of the Boomtown Rats' "Ratlife" tour.

== Other work ==
Sprackling worked with The Cure, appearing on the track "Just Say Yes". She had previously featured on the Prodigy's cover of L7's "Fuel My Fire" (from their 1997 album, The Fat of the Land); Deepsky's "Smile" (from the 2002 album, In Silico); Jeff Beck's "Pork-U-Pine" (from the 2003 album, Jeff) and Junkie XL's songs, "Crusher", "Spirits", and "Beauty Never Fades" (from his 2003 album, Radio JXL: A Broadcast from the Computer Hell Cabin).

On 13 November 2015, Saffron performed a solo show at the 100 Club, London. She performed with guitarist Darren Beale and fellow singer Mel Sanson. She continues to tour both with Republica and with her solo show, which incorporates special guests.

In April 2016, Saffron assembled a full solo band consisting of Tony Feedback (Angelic Upstarts, Sham 69, Urban Dogs, UK Subs) on guitar, Piers Gielgud (Meat Beat Manifesto) on bass, Brad Walkhouse on saxophone/horns and Josh Collins (Reverbed) on drums. The lineup also occasionally includes Darren Beale (Boomtown Rats) on guitar. The band debuted at Polyfest 3 playing a mix of X-ray Spex classics and Republica hits.

In June 2022 Saffron took part in the Electric Ladies tour along with Toyah Willcox and Lene Lovich. A proportion of the income from the tour went towards fellow musician Hazel O'Connor to help her ongoing recovery from ill health.

Saffron now works as a mental health nurse as well as continuing to perform with Republica and as a solo artist.

== Discography ==
=== Solo singles ===
- "Solitaire" (1992)
- "Losing Control" (1992)
- "One Love" (1992)
- "Circles" (1993) - No.60 (UK)
- "World of You" (1993)
- "Fluffy Toy" (1993)
- "Mantra" (1993)
